= The Forgotten Day =

Hong Kong television series

- 失憶24小時
- Genre: Sitcom
- Created by: Amy Wong Sum-wai
- Directed by: Wong Wai-yip; Wong Chu-wah
- Starring: Roger Kwok; Shaun Tam; David Chiang; Grace Wong; Roxanne Tong; Zoie Tam; Elvina Kong; Anthony Ho; Max Cheung; Lisa Lau; Bowie Wu
- Country of origin: Hong Kong
- Original language: Cantonese
- No. of episodes: 27

Production
- Producer: Amy Wong Sum-wai
- Production location: Hong Kong
- Running time: 45 minutes
- Production company: TVB

Original release
- Network: TVB Jade
- Release: 15 February – 26 March 2021

The Forgotten Day
- Traditional Chinese: 失憶24小時
Transcriptions

The Forgotten Day (Chinese: 失憶24小時) is a Sitcom television drama produced by TVB. It stars Roger Kwok, Shaun Tam, David Chiang and Grace Wong. Amy Wong Sum-wai serves as the producer.

== Cast and characters ==
=== Main characters ===
- Roger Kwok as Ng Yiu-chong (吳耀中), a waiter. He indirectly causes Mung Yat-yin to suffer from amnesia. Feeling guilty, he helps Mung Yat-yin to search for his lost memory.
- Shaun Tam as Mung Yat-yin (蒙一言), an interior designer. He is kidnapped and suffers from transient global amnesia due to a head injury.
- David Chiang as Peter Mung Kwan-sui (蒙君瑞), Mung Yat-yin and Mung Siu-dou’s father.
- Grace Wong as Freeya Yau Fei-yee (游菲兒), Mung Yat-yin’s wife. She is missing after her husband’s injury and amnesia.
- Roxanne Tong as Dr. "Yan" Nam Hoi-ching (藍海晴), a clinical psychologist who treats Mung Yat-yin’s amnesia.

=== Major Supporting Characters ===
- Zoie Tam as Maya Sze Man-nga (施文雅), Ng Yiu-chong’s wife.
- Elvina Kong as Mable Ng Shun-mei (吳順美), a taxi driver and Ng Yiu-chong’s younger sister.
- Anthony Ho as Ng Yiu-chung (吳耀松), Ng Yiu-chong’s younger brother who is mentally disabled.
- Max Cheung as Evans (伊雲思), Mable’s ex-husband.
- Lisa Lau as Mung Siu-dou (蒙小豆), a veterinary nurse and Mung Yat-yin’s younger sister.
