= Inspector Gourmet =

Hong Kong television series

- Official poster
- Also known as: Gluttonous Detective
- 為食神探
- Genre: Modern Drama, Comedy, Detective fiction
- Created by: Hong Kong Television Broadcasts Limited
- Written by: Ng Siu-tung (head writer), Dung Si-ting, Ko Wai-man, Chan Hoi-keung, Lai Ka-ming, Cheung Chung-yan, Tam Chui-san
- Starring: Kenneth Ma; Louis Yuen; Priscilla Wong; Eliza Sam; Oscar Leung; Jacqueline Wong; Elvina Kong
- Theme music composer: Alan Cheung
- Opening theme: "Tempted Heart" (誘心人) by Jinny Ng
- Ending theme: "I Don't Remember" (我記不起) by Linda Chung
- Country of origin: Hong Kong
- Original language: Cantonese
- No. of episodes: 20

Production
- Executive producer: Catherine Tsang
- Producer: Leung Choi-yuen
- Production location: Hong Kong
- Editor: Ng Siu-tung
- Camera setup: Multi camera
- Running time: 45 minutes
- Production company: TVB

Original release
- Network: TVB Jade
- Release: 29 August – 18 September 2016

Inspector Gourmet
- Traditional Chinese: 為食神探
- Simplified Chinese: 为食神探
- Literal meaning: "Gluttonous Detective"
Transcriptions
Standard Mandarin
- Hanyu Pinyin: Wèishí Shéntàn
Yue: Cantonese
- Yale Romanization: Wàisihk Sàntaam
- Jyutping: Wai4sik6 San4taam1
- IPA: [wɐ̭i.sèk̚ sɐ̭n.tʰáːm]

Inspector Gourmet (Chinese: 為食神探; Cantonese Yale: Wàisihk Sàntaam; literally "Gluttonous Detective") is a 2016 Hong Kong television comedy and fictional detective drama produced by Leung Choi-yuen for TVB, starring Kenneth Ma, Louis Yuen, Priscilla Wong and Eliza Sam as the main cast. It premiered on Hong Kong's TVB Jade and Malaysia's Astro On Demand on August 29, 2016, airing Monday through Sunday during its 9:30-10:30 pm timeslot and concluding September 19, 2016 with a total of 20 episodes.

Inspector Gourmet centers on solving mysteries with a food theme. The title of the drama is in reference to Louis Yuen's character Mak Sai. Mak Sai is described as a food addict with amazing crime solving skills due to his extraordinary sense of taste, smell and sight.

== Synopsis ==
Yeung Tak-kei (Kenneth Ma), who calls himself Bill Kei, is a line cook at a high end traditional Cantonese restaurant. He is an unruly worker who spends his time on his cellular phone and flirting with the restaurant's hostess during work hours. A fan of detective comics, his real passion is to become an investigation detective like his older half-sister Chu Sau-na (Elvina Kong), who owns her own private investigation agency. Bill meets Mak Sai (Louis Yuen), a food addict with a high detail sense of observation and taste, when Sai comes to the restaurant Bill works at to try their signature dishes. Coincidentally Sau-na and Sai are also acquainted with each other as the two formerly dated and were colleagues during their days in the police force.

On the same day Sai is at the restaurant, Bill gets tangled into his boss's extramarital affair with the restaurant's flirtatious hostess. Sau-na is also at the restaurant as she was hired by Bill's boss to investigate who has been blackmailing him with images of his adulterous affair. With Bill, Sau-na and Sai detective thinking the three discovers who is the blackmailer. However Bill gets fired from his job as he was the one who initially took the adulterous images, but Bill sees it as an opportunity to finally follow his true passion and begs Sau-na to hire him at her detective agency firm. Sau-na however refuses to hire Bill since he is inexperienced, but Bill's persistence and agreeable salary changes her mind. Sau-na's struggle and constant fight to keep alive the detective agency she inherited, from her soon to be ex-husband who has stolen all her staff, more than half her office and new clients, Sau-na has no choice but to hire Bill for extra help.

Bill meets and falls in love at first sight with Tong Ka-ka (Eliza Sam), a righteous magazine writer. After Bill helps Ka-ka find the culprit that has been harassing a small family run noodle shop, Ka-ka quits her job as a writer due to her unreasonable boss who refused to publish her article because of fear of offending triads. Ka-ka then gets hired at Sau-na's detective agency and partners up with Bill to investigate cases. After many failed investigation attempts, Ka-ka is aware that both Bill and her are not skillful enough to be good detectives, so she persuades Sai to join the detective agency by fulfilling his food craving.

During a case investigation, Sai and Bill meets Sam Oi-kiu (Priscilla Wong), a crass tomboy nicknamed Sister Kill. Kiu is a van driver that leads a small neighborhood gang. Sau-na sees Kiu's potential as an investigator with her electronic savvy skills, amazing driving and recruits her to join her team. While investigating cases Sai reconnects with his former subordinate Cheung Kwok-wah (Oscar Leung). Wah was pressured into being a trial witness against Sai, that put Sai in jail two years ago. Sai forgives Wah as Wah still thinks of Sai as his true boss, on the other hand Sai is also slowly setting up revenge against Wah's current superior who framed him.

Bill and Ka-ka meets Wah's girlfriend Janice Chow Ching (Jacqueline Wong), a new pastry chef at their local cafe. Janice has an immediate interest in Ka-ka and seems to be part of her past that she has forgotten. Janice's strange behavior in stalking Ka-ka and coming on to Bill sexually gets him worried about Ka-ka who he has just begun dating. Janice is good at hiding her true intentions by pretending to be friendly with Ka-ka but soon the team uncovers Janice's deranged personality and her motive.

== Cast ==
=== Robert Chu Detective Agency ===
- Elvina Kong as Anna Chu Sau-na (朱秀娜)

Bill's older half-sister. Mak-sai's former girlfriend and colleague. Ko Yan's ex-wife. She is a former police officer who currently manages a detective investigation agency which she inherited from her father. Due to Yan's pettiness and affair with Sau-na's trampy secretary Candy, Sau-na had to split half of her assets with Yan, which includes the detective agency.

- Kenneth Ma as Bill Kei Yeung Tak-kei (楊得基; self given nickname Bill Kei is homophone to Microsoft founder Bill Gates's name)

Chu Sau-na's younger half-brother. He calls himself Bill Kei and is a bit cocky. He worked as a restaurant chef, but gets fired after finding out about his boss's adulterous affair with the hostess. A fan of mystery manga, Bill follows his passion to solve mysteries and begs his sister to hire him at the detective agency. Tong Ka-ka is his love interest who he fell in-love with at first sight.

- Louis Yuen as Mak Sai (麥犀; likes to be referred to as "Brother Mak Sai 麥犀哥", which is homophone to Mexico in Cantonese)

A former inspector in the Hong Kong Police Force, Mak Tong and Sueng Yee's son and Sau-na's former boyfriend. He is called Inspector Gourmet for his food addiction and amazing case solving ability. Due to his food addiction, his subordinate Tai-wai frames him by tying him to triad connections which caused him to be imprisoned for 2 years. On the recommendation by Ka-ka, he is hired by Sau-na to her team.

- Eliza Sam as Tong Ka-ka (唐嘉嘉)

Nicknamed Baby Kaka by Bill, she is a magazine reporter who writes about the truth of a restaurant with triad ties. Afraid of offending the triads her boss refuses to publish her article. She later quits her writing job and decides to work for Sau-na's detective agency. Kaka also suffers from amnesia due to an accident she had and forgets an entire six month long memory. While taking baking classes she starts to regain these lost memories and soon realizes the danger she is in.

- Priscilla Wong as Sam Oi-kiu (岑愛嬌; nicknamed Sister Kill)

Fung Ching-mui's daughter. Everyone calls her Sister Kill (Kill姐) because she is a butch tomboy who is the leader of a small neighborhood gang. Kiu works as a delivery van driver. Bill and Sai meets Kiu when they are investigating a possible injury insurance fraud case that involves Kiu's gang member. Sau-na sees Kiu's potential as an investigator and hires her to join her team. She and Sai later form a close bond because of their volatile relationships with their father. Kiu becomes Sai love interest through a strong partnership and understanding of each others family background.

- Bobo Yeung as Winnie

The front desk receptionist that both Sau-na and Ko-yan shared when Yan took over half the office.

=== Smart Detective Agency ===
- Timothy Cheng as Ko Yan (高仁; homophone to Kou Yan, 高人, very skillful man)

Sau-na's ex-husband. He was also a protege to her father. The two decides to divorce after he has an affair with Sau-na's trampy secretary Candy. Being a petty person he forces Sau-na to split her assets with him which resulted in him taking half her detective firm and stealing all potential new clients. After being blackmailed by Lo Tai-wai, Yan loses everything and Candy breaks up with him.

- Iva Law as Candy

Sau-na's former secretary and also Ko Yan's mistress. After Ko Yan takes over more than half the detective agency she moves over to work for him. Candy is also as petty as Ko Yan. Candy is always reminding Sau-na that she is prettier and younger than Sau-na.

- Kerry Chan as Ada, Ivana Wong (王舒銳) as Bonnie, Lucy Li as Connie, Osanna Chiu as Dora

Sexily dressed private investigators. Ko Yan dubs the four of them as his "Smart Girls".

=== Police force ===
- Eric Li as Lo Tai-wai (盧大維; name is homophone to late Hong Kong actor David Lo Tai-wai, 盧大偉)

A mid-high level CID police officer and Cheung Kwok-wah's supervisor. Tai-wai was also Sai's former subordinate who used Sai's food addiction to frame him to connections with triads and then later taking Sai's position. Jealous of Sai, he has a vendetta against him and tries to ruin Sai in every possible way. He is a mean superior who bullies his underlings and takes credit for their hard work.

- Oscar Leung as Cheung Kwok-wah (張國華; nicknamed Nga Dai Wah (淆底華) meaning "Confused Bottom Wah")

A mid ranking CID police officer and Sai's former subordinate, who was pressured and blackmailed by Lo Tai-wai into testifying against Mak Sai and caused Sai to be imprisoned for two years. Sai forgives Wah as Sai knows it was all Wai's doing. Wah is true to and worships Sai as he still refers to Sai as his boss. He goes as far as standing up to Wai in order to save Sai's life. He is also Janice Chow Ching's boyfriend.

- Kedar Wong as Lok (樂), Louis Szeto as Biu (標), GoGo Cheung as Jenny, Terence Tung as Man (文), Marco Lee, Andy Wong

Lo Tai-wai's CID police backup team.

=== Extended cast ===
- Jacqueline Wong as Janice Chow Ching (周晴)

Cheung Kwok-wah's girlfriend. Janice is a pastry chef and instructor. She likes to drink whiskey while she's on the job. Her search for her unforgettable Black Forest cake and missing friend is somehow connected to Ka-ka's lost memories. Janice has a particular interest in Bill and doesn't seem that much interested in Kwok-wah who she has been dating for almost half a year. Janice pretends to be sweet and nice but really has a deranged personality where she is not happy until she takes everything away from Ka-ka.

- Vivien Yeo as Lee Nga-choi (李亞彩)

Mak Tong's neighbor. She also looks after Tong because of his short term memory. Choi is mentally challenge and acts like a child.

- Bowie Wu as Mak Tong (麥棠)

Sai's father. Tong lives in a suburban village and was a former officer. He suffers from dementia and has short term memory. Due to his dementia he is unaware that Sai is his son.

- Lau Kong as Sam Wing (岑榮)

Fung Ching-mui's husband. Sam Oi-kiu father and King-on's adopted father. He owns a second hand electronic and antique shop. Wing has a gambling problem and causes loan sharks to harass his business. Due to his need for fast money he dabs in small illegal dealings. He has a volatile relationship with his daughter Kiu, as he has been a bad parent to her.

- Angelina Lo as Fung Ching-mui (馮靜梅)

Sam Wing's wife. Sam Oi-kiu and King-on's mother. Due to her husbands constant illegal activities she has an affair with her former boyfriend Dong thinking he would be able to help Wing with his legal troubles. However the affair results in her becoming pregnant with King-on. Not wanting Wing to know about her extramarital affair she lies that King-on is Wing's biological son, while making Kiu think she is the illegitimate child..

- Mark Ma as Sam King-on (岑景安)

Sam Oi-kiu's younger half-brother. Dong's and Fung Ching-mui's illegitimate son who was conceived when Wing was in prison. Unaware of his wife's extramarital affair with Dong, Wing raised King-on as his own son. King-on is a university student.

=== Cameo appearance ===
- Anthony Ho as Passer-by (路人) - Passing by the streets he fights Bill for concert tickets while Bill is buying tickets from a ticket scalper.
- Brian Burrell as Robert (羅拔) - The founder of the Robert Chu Detective Agency and Sau-na's father. He mostly appears only on images.
- Joe Junior as Kam Tai-wai (甘大偉) - An elderly man with over 40 years detective experience. Newly hired by Sau-na, he gets fired the same day when he is caught falling asleep on the job.
- Suet Nei as Seung Yee (霜儀) - Mak Tong's deceased wife. Mak Sai's mother.
- Tam Ping Man as Hung Tin-sing (洪天成) - A triad boss Sai was acquainted with.
- Stephen Wong Ka-lok as Jason Pun Kai-tak (潘啟德) - Ka-ka's cousin who Bill assumes is her new boyfriend.

== Cases & Case cast ==
Betrayal and Blackmail at Chuen Kee (釧記) Ep. 1

- Océane Zhu as Fok Ling-ling (霍玲玲) - a flirtatious hostess at the restaurant.
- Henry Yu as Ma Fu-cheung (馬福祥) - owner of the restaurant.
- Eileen Yeow as Mrs. Ma (馬太) - Ma Fu-cheung's strict wife who manages the cash register at the restaurant.
- Oil Chan as Keung (強) - an assistant cook at the restaurant.

Bill catches his boss Ma Fu-cheung, having an affair with the flirtatious hostess Fok Ling-ling. Bill films the two rendezvous. Soon he finds out the images he took is being used to blackmail his boss by someone who sneaked into his cellular phone.

Lam Fu Kee (林冨記) Black Hearted Pork Wontons Ep. 1-2

- Lily Li as Mrs. To (杜嬸) - owner of the wonton shop.
- Joan Lee as Ting (婷) - Mrs. To's pregnant daughter.
- Winston Tsang as Kit (傑) - Ting's husband, who also works at the wonton shop.
- Kitterick Yiu as Szeto Ting-hoi (司徒正海) - the head of a franchise wonton restaurant.

A successful family owned wonton noodle shop is being harassed daily. Installing security cameras and reporting the incidents to the police hasn't helped, which forces the owners to have to shut down their business. Ka-ka taking pity on the shop owner offers to help find the culprit behind the harassments.

Egg Waffle Aroma Under the Bridge Ep. 3

- Eddie Li as Brother Hong (康哥)

In order for Sai to agree to work for the Robert Chu Detective Agency, Bill and Ka-ka must help him find the most beautiful chicken egg for an egg waffle vendor Sai has a craving for. However the most beautiful egg is not an actual egg.

Injury Insurance Fraud & Burglary Ep. 3-5

- Hero Yuen as Crazy Chui (傻超) - real name Kwan Chui (關超). He is one of Kiu's gang members.
- Lo Mang as Brother Hot chili pepper (辣椒哥) - a contractor that hired Crazy Chui.
- Miguel Choi as Rich master Hung (洪少) - a rich heir whose home was being renovated.

Sau-na picks up a huge insurance account. If her team succeeds they will become the insurance companies exclusive private investigators. Sai and Bill are sent to investigate an injury on the job insurance claim. Soon the case also involves a stolen antique from a rich man's home.

Real Love? & Salted Fish Girl's Death Ep. 5-8

- Cilla Kung as Pun Siu-lin (潘小蓮) - Duncan's fiancée. She works as a delivery girl.
- Mat Yeung as Duncan Dung Sai-kan (鄧世勤) - Siu-lin's fiancée. A successful chef with his own restaurant.
- Meini Cheung as Keira Tong Tse-ying (唐紫縈) - Duncan's business partner.
- Derek Wong as Kelvin - Duncan's special friend. A flirtatious homosexual that is also a pimp for gigolos.
- Au Hoi-ling as Mandy - A rich socialite with a penchant for gigolos.

Pun Siu-lin is a regular "plain Jane" who works as a delivery girl at her aunt's dry salted fish shop. She is aware of her unattractive appearance and occupation status, which make her skeptical if her successful and handsome fiancée Duncan really does love her. When Siu-lin accidentally dies, the secret to Duncan's success is revealed.

Unforgettable Black Forest Cake Ep. 6-16

- Nicholas Yuen as Issac - Ka-ka's boyfriend and Janice's obsession.

Kwok-wah, wanting to make Janice happy and surprise her, hires the Robert Chu team to search for her most unforgettable Black Forest Cake. The task is not easy as this was no ordinary cake since it was made by her friend Issac who Janice says has since disappeared. The more Ka-ka and Bill investigate, the more Ka-ka starts to regain her loss memories. As Ka-ka and the team further investigates, they discover that Janice may have planned the entire scheme in order to hurt Ka-ka.

Mak Sai and Nga-choi Bed Frame Ep. 10-12

- Gary Tam as Kwok Yat-ming (郭一鳴) - A supposed social worker in charge of Mak Tong.
- Lee Yee-man as Linda - A rude materialistic woman.

Mak Sai suspects that the so-called new social worker Kwok Yat-ming, in charge of Mak Tong is up to no good when Ming starts to use Tong's dementia to his advantage by pretending to be Tong's son in order to con his valuables. Before Sai can do anything to stop Ming, Sai is framed and accused of raping the village mentally challenged young lady Nga-choi. The investigation team soon discovers Ming has a dangerous vindictive personality.

Fake Goods & Sister Kill's Parents Ep. 13-17

- Adam Ip as Mo (武哥) - Sam Wing's new business partner.
- Parkman Wong as Dong (東) - Fung Ching-mui's longtime acquaintance.

While investigating a fake goods case, Sai and Kiu encounter Kiu's father at the hub of where all the activity takes place. Kiu suspects her father is still up to no good especially since her mother seems to be in need of money fast. To Kiu's surprise the money her mother is desperate for is given to another man and not her father. Kiu discovers this other man in her mother's life could do great damage to her family.

Investigation of Tong Yu-wah Ep. 17-20

- Tracy Ip as Ko Man (高敏) - Tong Yu-wah's wife. She suspects her husband is having an affair.
- Gary Chan as Tong Yu-wah (湯耀華) - Ko Man's husband. A former triad boss who is now a restaurateur.
- Billy Cheung as Brother Tak (德哥) - Bill's former supervisor who is now head chef of Tong Yu-wah's restaurant.
- Nicole Wan as Yumi Kan Wai-san (簡慧珊) - Tong Yu-wah's mistress.

Former triad boss turned successful restaurateur Tong Yu-wah, suspects he is being food poisoned since his health has been failing and doctors can't figure out what is wrong with him. He hires the Robert Chu team to investigate. At the same time his wife Ko Man also hires the Robert Chu team to investigate her husband Yu-wah, as she suspects he is having an affair with someone at work. Sau-na readily agrees to take on both cases as she thinks it will be killing two birds with one stone. However the case gets complicated when Yu-wah's mistress Yumi, hires Ko Yan to also investigate on Yu-wah and his wife Ko Man. When Yu-wah suddenly dies, the police gets involve and once again Lo Tai-wai is trying to pin it on Sai.

== Soundtrack ==
The main opening theme song "Tempted Heart" (誘心人) was sung by Jinny Ng, composed by Alan Cheung and lyrics by Sandy Chang. A sub theme song named "I Don't Remember" (我記不起) performed by Linda Chung, and also composed by Alan Cheung, with lyrics by Sandy Chang was played during the closing credits on some episodes.

Track listing

No.	Title	Lyrics	Music	Singer(s)	Length
1.	"Tempted Heart" (誘心人)	Sandy Chang	Alan Cheung	Jinny Ng	3:14
2.	"I Don't Remember" (我記不起)	Sandy Chang	Alan Cheung	Linda Chung	4:06

== Location ==
*A list of the actual restaurants depicted in the drama. *Depicted under a false name in the drama

- Chuen Kee (釧記) - *Prestige Cuisine (利得火鍋小炒) G&1/F, Charmhill Centre, 50A Hillwood Road, Tsim Sha Tsui, Hong Kong
- Lam Fu Kee (林冨記) - *Hap Lung Noodle Shop (合隆麵家) 44 Tam Kung Rd, To Kwa Wan, Hong Kong
- Mijas Spanish Restaurant Shop 102, 1/F, Murray House, Stanley, Hong Kong
- Lim Kee Noodle House (林記面家) G/F, 16 Ting Fu Street, Ngau Tau Kwok, Hong Kong
- Fusing Seafood Restaurant (正斗海鮮火鍋館) G/F, Hing Wah Commercial Building, 450-454 Shanghai Street, Mong Kok, Hong Kong
- Kee Kee Restaurant (記記莱館) - *Hing Kee Restaurant (興記莱館) G/F, 14, 19, 21 Temple Street & 48 Arthur Street, Yau Ma Tei, Hong Kong
- 2/3 DOLCI Taikoo Place Cornwall House, 28 Tong Chong St, Quarry Bay, Hong Kong
- Crown Wine Cellars 18 Deep Water Bay Lane, Shouson Hill, Deep Water Bay, Hong Kong
- Monsieur CHATTÉ 121 Bonham Strand, Sheung Wan, Hong Kong
- PizzaExpress 10 Wing Fung St, Wan Chai, Hong Kong

== Development and production ==
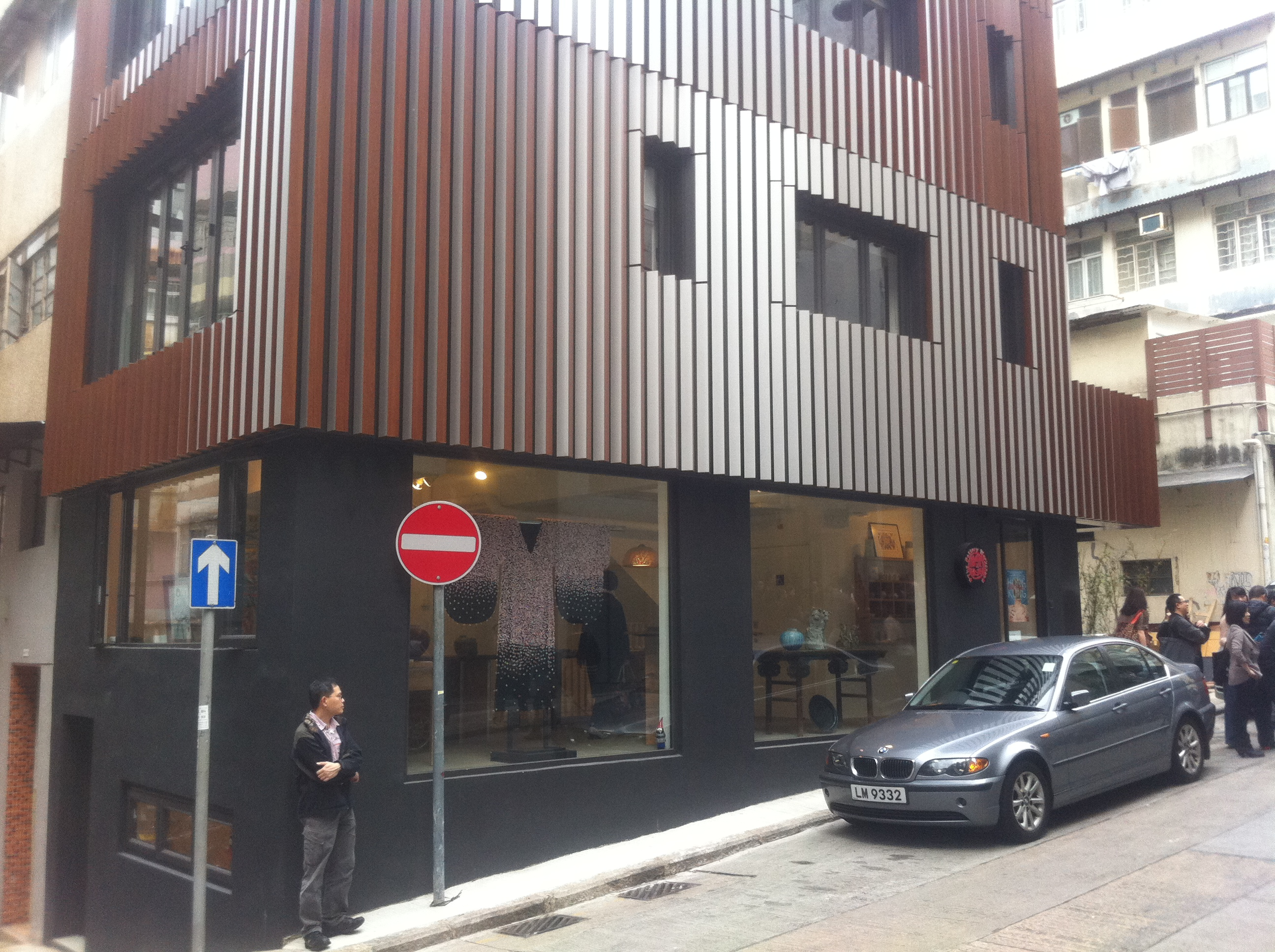
24 Tai Ping Shan Street, Sheung Wan, Hong Kong

- The costume fitting ceremony was held on March 17, 2015, 12:30 pm at Tseung Kwan O TVB City Studio One.
- The blessing ceremony was held on April 13, 2015, 2:00 pm at Tseung Kwan O TVB City Studio sixteen.
- Filming took place from March till June 2015, entirely on location in Hong Kong. A major filming location is the newly redeveloped area of Sheung Wan District, Hong Kong. The building exterior depicted as the "Robert Chu Detective Investigation" office is 24 Upper Station Street and Tai Ping Shan Street, Sheung Wan, Hong Kong, which is an actual newly renovated residential building. The exterior that is depicted as the building Bill and Sai live at is 3 School Street, Tai Hang, Hong Kong. The exterior of "Paris Filles Cafe", where the main cast frequent is a series of storefronts located at Tai Ping Shan Street, Sheung Wan, Hong Kong. The main shot of the cafe is the storefront of 12 Tai Ping Shan Street, Sheung Wan, Hong Kong.

== Viewership ratings ==
Timeslot (HKT)	#	Day(s)	Week	Episode(s)	Average points	Peaking points
Mon - Sun (9:30-10:30 pm); 21:30–22:30	1	Mon - Fri	29 Aug – 02 Sep 2016	1 — 5	23.8	27
Mon - Sun (9:30-10:30 pm); 21:30–22:30	1	Sat	03 Sep 2016	6	18.1	--
Mon - Sun (9:30-10:30 pm); 21:30–22:30	1	Sun	04 Sep 2016	7	20.3	--
Mon - Sun (9:30-10:30 pm); 21:30–22:30	2	Mon - Fri	05–09 Sep 2016	8 — 12	22.2	
Mon - Sun (9:30-10:30 pm); 21:30–22:30	3	Mon - Fri	12–16 Sep 2016	13 — 17	22	24
Mon - Sun (9:30-10:30 pm); 21:30–22:30	3	Sat	17 Sep 2016	18		
Mon - Sun (9:30-10:30 pm); 21:30–22:30	3	Sun	18 Sep 2016	19-20	22	
Total average					22	27

September 10, 2016: No episode broadcast due to airing of 2016 Mr. Hong Kong.
September 11, 2016: No episode broadcast due to airing 2016 Miss Hong Kong Pageant.

== Awards and nominations ==
Year	Ceremony	Category	Nominee	Result
2016	StarHub TVB Awards	My Favourite TVB Actress	Priscilla Wong	Nominated
2016	StarHub TVB Awards	My Favourite TVB Actor	Kenneth Ma	Nominated
2016	StarHub TVB Awards	My Favourite TVB Theme Song	"Enticing" (誘心人) by Jinny Ng	Nominated
2016	TVB Star Awards Malaysia	My Favourite TVB Actor in a Leading Role	Kenneth Ma	Nominated
2016	TVB Star Awards Malaysia	My Favourite TVB On Screen Couple	Kenneth Ma & Eliza Sam	Nominated
2016	TVB Star Awards Malaysia	My Favourite TVB Theme Song	"Enticing" (誘心人) by Jinny Ng	Nominated
2016	TVB Anniversary Awards	Best Actor	Kenneth Ma	Nominated
2016	TVB Anniversary Awards	Most Popular TV Female Character	Jacqueline Wong	Nominated
2016	TVB Anniversary Awards	Most Popular Series Partnership	Kenneth Ma & Eliza Sam	Nominated
2016	TVB Anniversary Awards	My Favourite TVB Theme Song	"Enticing" (誘心人) by Jinny Ng	Nominated
2016	TVB Anniversary Awards	My Favourite TVB Theme Song	"I Can't Remember" (我記不起) by Linda Chung	Nominated
