= Roxanne Tong =

Hong Kong actress

- 湯洛雯
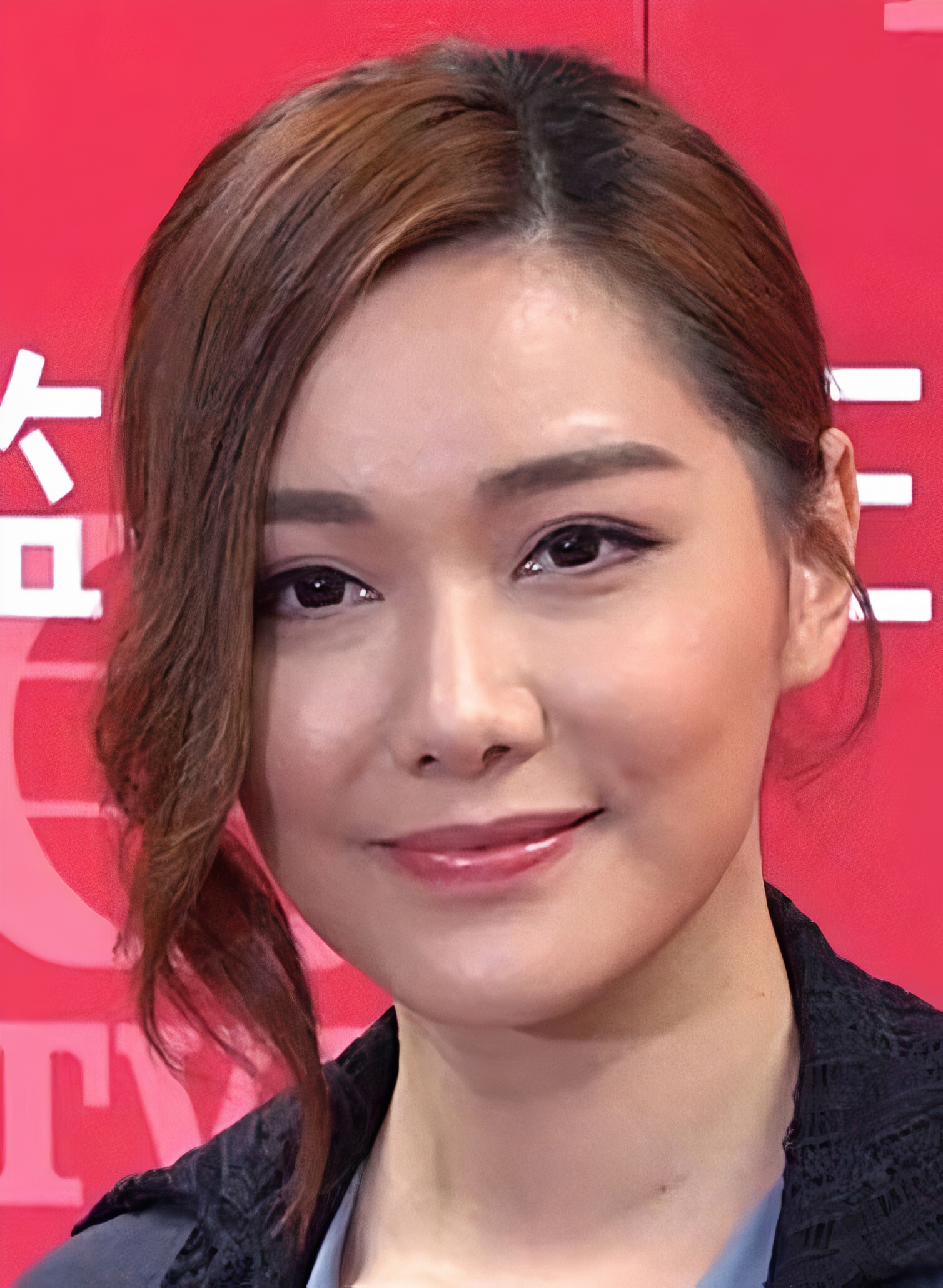
- Tong in 2019
- Born: Tong Lok-man (湯樂雯); 6 May 1987 (age 39); British Hong Kong
- Occupations: Actress, television host, model
- Years active: 2012–present
- Agent: TVB
- Spouse: Kenneth Ma (m. 2023)
- Parent: Tong Chun-chung (father)
- Relatives: Kent Tong (uncle)
- Family: Cassandre Tong (younger sister)
- Awards: Miss Hong Kong 2012 Tourism Ambassador, Beauty Sublimation & Most Popular Pageant on Scene StarHub TVB Awards 2017 – Best New TVB Artiste

Chinese name
- Traditional Chinese: 湯洛雯
- Simplified Chinese: 汤洛雯
Transcriptions
Standard Mandarin
- Hanyu Pinyin: Tāng Luòwén
Yue: Cantonese
- Jyutping: Tong1 Lok3 Man4

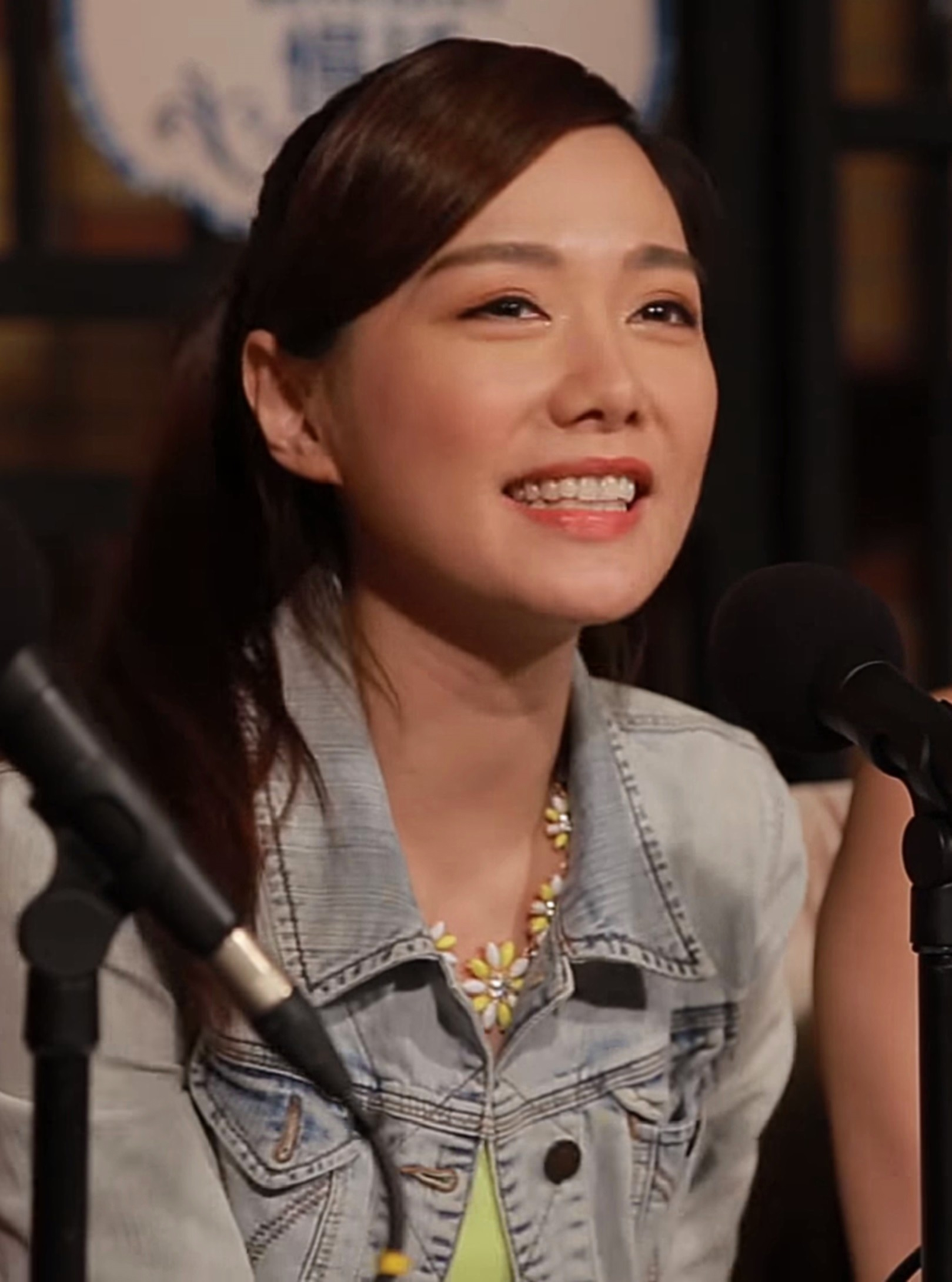
Tong in 2014

Roxanne Tong Lok-man (Chinese: 湯洛雯; born 6 May 1987) is a Hong Kong actress and former beauty pageant contestant contracted to TVB.

== Background ==
Roxanne Tong was born in Hong Kong, the eldest of two children. Her father, Tong Chun Chung, was an actor. She is the niece of Hong Kong actor Kent Tong. She graduated from University College London with a degree in Psychology.

== Career ==
Roxanne Tong had signed with Primo and became a model. She competed in the Miss Hong Kong 2012 beauty pageant, receiving the Tourism Ambassador, Beauty Sublimation and Most Popular Pageant on Scene awards, and was eventually placed in Top 6. Later, she joined TVB and made her acting debut in the sitcom Come Home Love as Lee Sze-sze. She co-hosted the education program Sidewalk Scientist (season 2) as well. In 2014, Tong competed in the Mainland China competition The Chinese Dream Show (中国梦想秀). Michael Miu came as the special guest for her. She was eventually placed 4th in the competition.

In 2017, Tong won the Best New TVB Artiste award at the 2017 StarHub TVB Awards. In June 2019, she was cast to replace Jacqueline Wong in reshoot of the sequel Forensic Heroes IV, which was broadcast in February 2020.

== Personal life ==
Roxanne Tong had been in a relationship with actor Joey Law for four years. They began dating in 2014. After the media reported that the two parties had separated in March 2018, Tong confessed the breakup through Instagram and said she wanted to keep a low profile.

On 12 June 2020, Tong and Kenneth Ma were spotted dating in Hung Hom, and they admitted their relationship on Instagram the next day. They announced their engagement on 1 January 2023.

Tong is best friends with Tracy Chu, Angel Chiang, Jennifer Shum and Kayi Cheung. She is also good friends with Samantha Ko, Sisley Choi, Telford Wong and Lucas Yiu.

== Filmography ==
=== Television dramas ===
Year	Title	Role	Notes
2012-15	Come Home Love	Lee Sze-sze (李思思)	Supporting Role
2015	With or Without You	Yin Hung (嫣 紅)	Supporting Role
2015-16	The Executioner	Sun Yuet (新 月)	Supporting Role
2016	Fashion War	Yuen Fong-fong (阮芳芳)	Supporting Role
2016	My Dangerous Mafia Retirement Plan	young So Yau-lam (青年蘇佑琳)	Guest Appearance
2016	Come Home Love: Dinner at 8	Emma Yau Wai-yan (邱慧茵)	Supporting Role
2016	Between Love & Desire	Haley Wong Hiu-yan (王曉欣)	Major Supporting Role
2016	A Fist Within Four Walls	Connie (幗)	Supporting Role
2017	Provocateur	Amber Chow Pui-yu (鄒珮瑜)	Major Supporting Role
2017	My Dearly Sinful Mind	Icy Tsang Sau-yee (曾秀怡)	Supporting Role
2017	The Unholy Alliance	Kelly Law Ho-man (羅皓雯)	Supporting Role
2017	The Tofu War	Szeto Nam (司徒嵐)	Major Supporting Role
2018	Birth of a Hero	Ai Bing-bing (艾冰冰)	Major Supporting Role
2018	Daddy Cool	Liu Sui-fong/Poon Hiu-lam (廖瑞芳/潘曉琳)	Guest Appearance
2018	Another Era	Alice Yuen Ling-kiu (阮令翹)	Major Supporting Role
2019	My Commissioned Lover	Long Chiu-shun (郎朝信)	Major Supporting Role
2019	Justice Bao: The First Year	Pong Gum-tsz (龐金枝)	Guest Appearance
2019	Big Coalition of Maids	Yuet Kao/ Mok Siu-chui (月皎/ 莫小翠)	Main Role
2020	Forensic Heroes IV	Chris Tsui Yi (徐意)	Major Supporting Role
2020	Airport Strikers	"Nana" Yu On-na (余安娜)	Main Role
2021	The Forgotten Day	Dr. "Yan" Nam Hoi-ching (藍海晴)	Main Role
2021	Final Destiny	So Yau (蘇柔)	Main Role
2022	Barrack O'Karma 1968	Lai Sin-yi (黎倩儀)	Supporting Role
2022	Stranger Anniversary	Yu Fung (俞風)	Main Role
2023	Secret Door	WSGT "Dawn" Yeung Yan-hiu (楊忻曉)	Main Role
TBA	OPM	Katty To Yee-kei (杜綺琪)	Main Role

=== Films ===
- 2019: Line Walker 2
- 2022: Love Suddenly

== Awards and nominations ==
=== Miss Hong Kong 2012 ===
Year	Category	Result
2012	Tourism Ambassador	Won
2012	Beauty Sublimation	Won
2012	Most Popular Pageant on Scene	Won

=== TVB Anniversary Awards ===
Year	Category	Work	Result
2015	Best Show Host	Sidewalk Scientist (with Ali Lee, Leung Ka-ki, Jacqueline Wong, Mayanne Mak, Sammi Cheung)	Nominated
2016	Most Improved Female Artiste	Fashion War, My Dangerous Mafia Retirement Plan, Come Home Love: Dinner at 8, Between Love & Desire, A Fist Within Four Walls	Nominated
2016	Best Supporting Actress	Between Love & Desire — Wong Hiu-yan (Haley)	Nominated
2017	Most Improved Female Artiste	Provocateur, My Dearly Sinful Mind, The Unholy Alliance, The Tofu War	Nominated
2017	Most Popular Female Character	The Tofu War — Szeto Nam	Nominated
2018	Most Improved Female Artiste	Birth of a Hero, Daddy Cool, Another Era	Nominated
2018	Favourite TVB Actress in Malaysia	Birth of a Hero — Ai Bing-bing	Nominated
2018	Favourite TVB Actress in Singapore	Birth of a Hero — Ai Bing-bing	Nominated
2019	Most Improved Female Artiste	My Commissioned Lover, Justice Bao: The First Year, Big Coalition of Maids, Feng Shui For The New Year, Inter Inter Intergen	Top 2
2019	Best Actress	Big Coalition of Maids — Yuet Kao	Nominated
2020	Best Supporting Actress	Forensic Heroes IV — Tsui Yi (Chris)	Nominated
2020	Best Actress	Airport Strikers — Yu On-na (Nana)	Nominated
2020	Favourite TVB Actress in Malaysia	Airport Strikers — Yu On-na (Nana)	Nominated
2021	Best Actress	The Forgotten Day — Nam Hoi-ching (Yan)	Nominated
2021	Best Actress	Final Destiny — So Yau	Nominated
2021	Most Popular Female Character	Final Destiny — So Yau	Nominated
2021	Favourite TVB Actress in Malaysia	The Forgotten Day — Nam Hoi-ching (Yan)	Nominated
2021	Favourite TVB Actress in Malaysia	Final Destiny — So Yau	Nominated
2022	Best Actress	Stranger Anniversary — Yu Fung	Nominated
2022	Most Popular Female Character	Stranger Anniversary — Yu Fung	Nominated
2022	Favourite TVB Actress in Malaysia	Stranger Anniversary — Yu Fung	Nominated
2023	Best Actress	Secret Door — Yeung Yan-hiu (Dawn)	Nominated

=== TVB Star Awards Malaysia ===
Year	Category	Work	Result
2017	Favourite TVB Most Improved Female Artiste	Provocateur, My Dearly Sinful Mind, The Unholy Alliance, The Tofu War	Top 3
2017	Favourite TVB Supporting Actress	The Tofu War — Szeto Nam	Nominated
2017	Top 17 Favourite TVB Drama Characters	The Tofu War — Szeto Nam	Nominated
2017	Favourite TVB Onscreen Couple	The Tofu War (with Lai Lok-yi)	Nominated

=== StarHub TVB Awards ===
Year	Category	Work	Result
2017	Best New TVB Artiste	—N/a	Won
2017	My Favourite TVB Supporting Actress	The Tofu War — Szeto Nam	Nominated

=== Yahoo！Asia Buzz Awards ===
Year	Category	Result
2020	Most Searched Photos for HK Female Artiste	Won

=== People's Choice Television Awards ===
Year	Category	Work	Result
2021	People's Choice Most Improved Female Artiste	The Forgotten Day, Final Destiny	Nominated
2021	People's Choice Best Actress	Final Destiny — So Yau	Nominated
