= Provocateur (TV series) =

2017 Hong Kong television drama

- Also known as: The Conspirators; Conspiring with Spies
- 與諜同謀
- Genre: Crime drama Thriller
- Created by: Wong Wai-sing
- Written by: Lam Lai-kuen
- Starring: Gallen Lo; Fred Cheng; Ali Lee; Jacqueline Wong; Jonathan Cheung; Jack Wu; Winki Lai; Roxanne Tong
- Opening theme: "獨來獨往" (Alone) by Gallen Lo
- Ending theme: "地盡頭" (The End of the World) by Fred Cheng
- Country of origin: Hong Kong
- Original languages: Chinese (Cantonese, Mandarin)
- No. of episodes: 25

Production
- Executive producer: Wong Wai-sing
- Running time: 45 minutes
- Production company: TVB

Original release
- Network: TVB Jade
- Release: 6 March – 8 April 2017

Provocateur
- Traditional Chinese: 與諜同謀
- Simplified Chinese: 与谍同谋
- Cantonese Yale: Yúhdihp Tùngmàu
- Literal meaning: "scheming with spies"
Transcriptions
Standard Mandarin
- Hanyu Pinyin: Yúdié Tóngmóu
Yue: Cantonese
- Yale Romanization: Yúhdihp Tùngmàu
- Jyutping: Jyu5dip6 Tung4mau4
- IPA: [jy̬ː.tìːp̚ tʰo̭ŋ.mɐ̭u]

Provocateur (Chinese: 與諜同謀) is a 2017 Hong Kong television drama produced by Wong Wai-sing and TVB. It premiered on TVB Jade in Hong Kong, Hub Drama First in Singapore and Astro On Demand in Malaysia on 6 March 2017. It stars Gallen Lo in his first TVB drama since 2009's Born Rich.

== Synopsis ==
After the deaths of his first and second wife, cosmetic mogul Cheuk Kwan-lam, known as "King", tries to turn over a new leaf. As fate would have it, he encounters a resourceful young man known as Ringo Poon, through whom he sees a younger version of himself. King develops a familial attachment towards Ringo. The young man also wins the favor of King's secretary Rachel Chan, who believes that Ringo would lead the company, Endless Beauty, to success.

Rachel, still mourning over the disappearance of her husband Vincent many years ago, drowns herself with work. Endless Beauty, as well as King himself, becomes her sole purpose in life. Ringo exploits the trust Rachel has in him, also winning King's approval. Little do they know that Ringo is actually secretly conspiring with a team of talented people on the sly to steal trade secrets from large corporations for money. Ringo has been planning this for years, seeking the best opportunity to take destructive revenge on Endless Beauty.

== Cast and characters ==
- Gallen Lo as Cheuk Kwan-lam (Chinese: 卓君臨; Jyutping: ceok3 gwan1 lam4) – known as King, the chairman of Endless Beauty, a successful Hong Kong cosmetics corporation. King is a cunning businessman who uses underhanded methods to take down his competitors. He's been through two marriages, both ending with his wives' passing. King has a close relationship with his personal assistant, Rachel, and his stepdaughter, Mani, who he has been cultivating to succeed his business.
- Fred Cheng as Ringo Poon Siu-kit (潘少杰; pun1 siu3 git6) – King's son who has been separated from King for a long time with his mother. He's a talented young man who is recruited into Endless Beauty as one of the company's two marketing managers. Ringo actually belongs to a team of young conspirators who steal trade secrets from large corporations for money. Sharing a mysterious past with King, Ringo has been eyeing Endless Beauty for quite some time, waiting for the right time to seek revenge.
- Ali Lee as Rachel Chan Hei-man (陳晞文; can4 hei1 man4) – King's personal assistant. She is a single mother, whose husband has been missing for many years.
- Jacqueline Wong as Mani Cheuk Man-lei (卓敏莉; ceok3 man5 lei6) – known as Sal Jeh, King's stepdaughter, to whom he is very close with. Mani is one of the two marketing managers at Endless Beauty. Her driven and ambitious personality puts her at odds with Ringo.
- Jack Wu as Lam Shun-fai (林信輝; lam4 seon3 fai1) – affectionately known as Turtle, a corporate spy and a member of Ringo's team. Turtle is an expert in disguise, and often acts as the inside man in a heist.
- Jonathan Cheung as Cyrus Ling Chun (凌晉; ling4 zeon3) – a corporate spy and a member of Ringo's team. Cyrus is in charge of collecting intel for the team.
- Roxanne Tong as Amber Chau Pui-yu (鄒珮瑜; zau1 pui3 jyu4) – a corporate spy and a member of Ringo's team. Amber is the team's social networker. She is from a wealthy family but is the daughter of her father's mistress. Amber and her half-sister are both fashion designers since their father owns a fashion enterprise.
- Winki Lai as To Chi-yan (杜志仁; dou6 zi3 jan4) – known as Yan Yan (忍忍), an IT genius and a member of Ringo's team, acting as the team's hacker.
- Stephanie Che as Laura – Rachel's close friend. Laura owns a clothing business and babysits Rachel's son.
- Jimmy Au as Tsang King-sang (曾京生; zang1 ging1 sang1) – King's right-hand man and chauffeur.
- Lee Shing-cheong as Chin Wing-tong (錢永棠; cin4 wing5 tong4) – King's opponent.
- Raymond Cho as Vincent Hong Yat-fung (康逸風; hong1 jat6 fung1) – Rachel's husband, who has disappeared.
- Yeung Chiu-hoi as Howard Luk Kai-ho (陸啟豪; luk6 kai2 hou4) – Mani's boyfriend.
- Law Lok-lam as Luk Yat Fan (陸一凡)- Howard's father. Wanted his son to marry Mani to help the family business. Later teams up with King's rival, Chin Wing-tong, and becomes a board member of Endless Beauty. Wants to see King fail.
- Aurora Li as Eva (程玉萍) - Works at Endless Beauty, a member of Mani's marketing team (Team A). Like her other Team A members, Eva constantly has to rush writing proposals and reports for her demanding career woman boss, Mani. Eva along with her team members resent the constant workload given to them by Mani. Spends time shopping online every time Mani is away from the office.
- Carat Cheung as Apple (戴如寶) - Works at Endless Beauty, a member of Ringo's marketing team (Team B). Unlike Team A, members of Team B have a more relaxed work environment.
- Dickson Lee as TC (趙秉權) - Hired by King to be the CEO of Endless Beauty.
- Joseph Yeung as Peter (彭醫生)- King's private doctor.

== Soundtrack ==
Track listing

| No. | Title | Lyrics | Music | Singer(s) | Length |
|---|---|---|---|---|---|
| 1. | "Alone" (獨來獨往) | Yeung Hei | Alan Cheung | Gallen Lo | 3:57 |
| 2. | "The End of the World" (地盡頭) | Sandy Chan | Damon Chui | Fred Cheng | 4:23 |

== Reception ==
=== Broadcast ===
The series premiere of Provocateur aired on 6 March 2017. It is also broadcast by Astro On Demand in Malaysia and StarHub's TVB First in Singapore, premiering it on the same time as Hong Kong.

In Hong Kong, the first episode received an average viewership rating of 25 points and peaked at 26 points, reaching 1.68 million viewers.

=== Critical reception ===
The debut week of Provocateur received mixed responses. On Douban, a Chinese media database, the drama received a rating of 5.8 out of 10 based on 500 votes. Most of the criticism was directed at female lead Ali Lee, who was criticised for her dull acting in the first two episodes. Gallen Lo's performance, however, received critical acclaim, with viewers citing Lo as their reason for tuning into the series.

== Awards and nominations ==
| Association | Category | Nominee | Result |
|---|---|---|---|
| StarHub TVB Awards | My Favourite TVB Drama | | Nominated |
| StarHub TVB Awards | My Favourite TVB Actor | Gallen Lo | Nominated |
| StarHub TVB Awards | Favourite TVB Supporting Actress | Jacqueline Wong | Won |
| StarHub TVB Awards | My Favourite TVB Drama Theme Song | "The End Of The World" by Fred Cheng | Nominated |
| StarHub TVB Awards | Best New TVB Artiste | Roxanne Tong | Won |
| TVB Star Awards Malaysia | My Favourite TVB Drama Series | | Nominated |
| TVB Star Awards Malaysia | My Favourite TVB Actor in a Leading Role | Gallen Lo | Nominated |
| TVB Star Awards Malaysia | My Favourite TVB Actress in a Supporting Role | Jacqueline Wong | Nominated |
| TVB Star Awards Malaysia | My Favourite TVB Most Improved Actress | Roxanne Tong | Nominated |
| TVB Anniversary Awards | Best Drama | | Nominated |
| TVB Anniversary Awards | Best Actor | Gallen Lo | Nominated |
| TVB Anniversary Awards | Best Actress | Jacqueline Wong | Nominated |
| TVB Anniversary Awards | Best Supporting Actor | Fred Cheng | Nominated |
| TVB Anniversary Awards | Most Improved Female Artiste | Roxanne Tong | Nominated |
| TVB Anniversary Awards | Most Improved Female Artiste | Jacqueline Wong | Nominated |
| TVB Anniversary Awards | Most Improved Male Artiste | "獨來獨往" (Alone) by Gallen Lo | Nominated |
| TVB Anniversary Awards | Most Improved Male Artiste | "地盡頭" (The End of the World) by Fred Cheng | Nominated |
