= Lily Li =

Hong Kong actress (1950–2024)

- 李麗麗
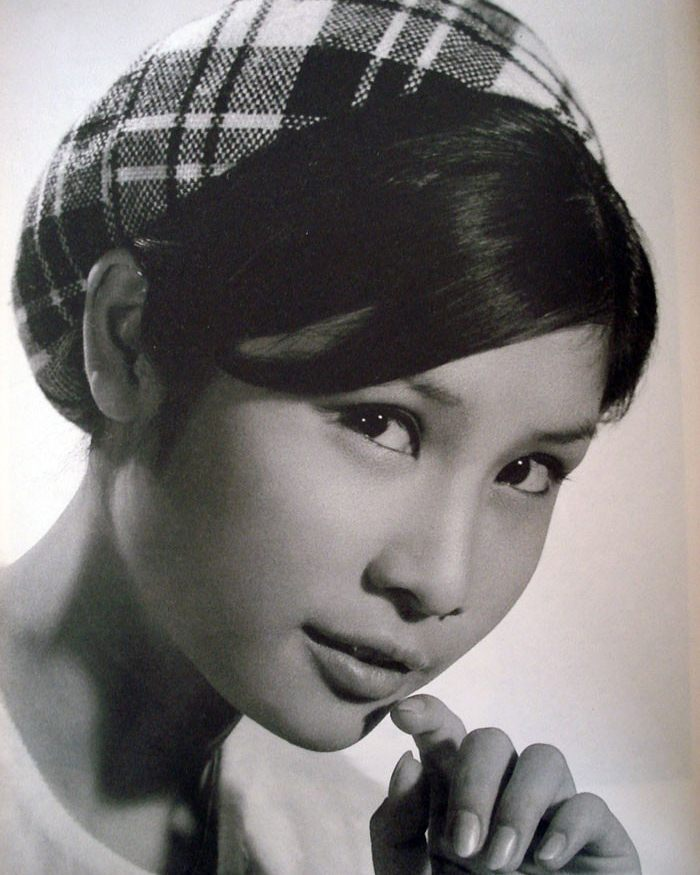
- Li in the 1960s
- Born: 14 June 1950; British Hong Kong
- Died: 27 October 2024 (aged 74); Hong Kong, China
- Years active: 1964–2020

Chinese name
- Traditional Chinese: 李麗麗
- Simplified Chinese: 李丽丽
Transcriptions
Standard Mandarin
- Hanyu Pinyin: Lǐ Lìlì
Yue: Cantonese
- Jyutping: Lei5 Lai6-lai6

Lily Li Lai-lai (Chinese: 李麗麗; 14 June 1950 – 27 October 2024) was a Hong Kong film and television actress. She is best known for her films The Wandering Swordsman, Executioners from Shaolin, One Foot Crane and The Young Master, and television series The Bride with White Hair, Blood Debt, Beyond the Realm of Conscience, and Demi-Gods and Semi-Devils.

== Early life ==
Li was born in Hong Kong and was educated at St. Johannes College (Catholic School). At the age of 11, Li started training with Shaw Brothers Acting School where she was taught Mandarin, contemporary dancing, classical dancing, ballet and martial arts.

== Career ==
In 1964 at age 14, Li made her feature film debut The Last Woman of Shang and was signed to an exclusive acting contract with Shaw Brothers Studio in 1966.

After a few years playing supporting roles, Li rose to fame when she played her first leading role in the 1970 film The Wandering Swordsman directed by Chang Cheh and starred David Chiang. Li became one of the more popular of the Shaw Brothers actresses from the late 1960s through to the 1970s and she appeared in many action films and was at one time the protégé of martial arts expert, director and actor Lau Kar-leung.

Early in her career with Shaw Brothers Studio, Li appeared in many martial arts dramas and often played smart and witty heroine roles. She joined the Commercial Television network Jiayi TV and starred in the lead role of the heroine in the television series The Bride with White Hair. After the collapse of Jiayi TV in 1978, Li travelled to Taiwan and starred in martial arts films including Relentless Broken Blade/Lyrical Blade and One Foot Crane. In early 1980, Li played the lead role in individual episodes for Hong Kong's public broadcaster RTHK for the series Light and Shadow in My City presented by Ivan Ho Sau-sun called 'Under The Roof: Gap', and the sequel presented by Dominic Lam Ka-wah, Light and Shadow in My City II's episode called 'The Half Life of Kam Chi'.

Li joined Rediffusion Television in 1980, now known as Asia Television (ATV), and starred in several television series including Blood Debt, Super Hero, 101 Citizen Arrest, Drunken Fist 2, Fly Over the Ring, The Devil Force and House Man. During her time with ATV, Li continued travelling to Taiwan to star in television dramas including Elephant Flying Across the River and Shaolin Disciple and appeared in independent Hong Kong films including The Young Master, Daggers 8 and Dreadnaught.

In 1988, Li left Asia Television and switched to TVB. She starred in numerous supporting roles including The Final Combat, The Legend of the Invincible, The Blood Hounds, State of Divinity, Better Halves and Beauty at War. Li left TVB in January 2020 after deciding not to renew her contract, ending a 32-year relationship with the TV network.

== Death ==
Li died from lung cancer in Hong Kong, on 27 October 2024, at the age of 74.

== Filmography ==
Note: Most of the characters' names are in Cantonese romanisation.

=== Television (TVB) ===
Television Broadcasts Limited (TVB)
Year	English Title	Chinese Title	Role	Notes
1989	The Final Combat	蓋世豪俠	Lee Kiu 李 嬌	
1989	Yanky Boy	回到唐山	Lu Yim-fong 魯艷芳	
1989	The War Heroes	天變	Mang Sheung 孟 湘	
1989	The Black Sabre	邊城浪子	Kit Yu 潔 如	
1989	Looking Back in Anger	義不容情	Miss Lam, Magazine Editor-in-Chief 林小姐, 雜誌社總編	
1989	Handcuff Me, Brother	線人	Sister Ying 瑛姐	TVB-produced TV movie
1990	The Young Leaves	迴路		TVB-produced TV movie
1990	The Legend of the Invincible	劍魔獨孤求敗	Yim Hiu-Ting 嚴曉青	
1990	The Gods and Demons of Zu Mountain	蜀山奇俠	Tan Ha Grandmaster 餐霞大師	
1990	The Blood Hounds	大唐名捕	Empress Wei 韋皇后	
1990	When Things Get Tough	午夜太陽	Kong Yook-lan 江玉蘭	
1990	The Challenge of Life	人在邊緣	Lam Suet-ping 林雪萍	
1990	Behind Bars	鐵窗雄淚	Miss Lau 劉小姐	TVB-produced TV movie
1991	A Way of Justice	人海驕陽	Chung Man-kuen 鍾文娟	
1991	Drifters	怒海孤鴻	Sister Lai 麗姐	
1991	Once a Killer	夢斷江湖		TVB-produced TV movie
1992	Vengeance	火玫瑰	Tong Siu-chui 湯小翠	
1992	Crime Fighters	九反威龍	Cheng Sau-lan 鄭秀蘭	
1992	Thief of Honour	血璽金刀	Grand Empress Dowager (Xie Daoqing) 謝太皇太后 (謝道清)	
1992	Eastern Hero	龍影俠	Ka Yin-sook 賈賢淑	
1992	Super Cop	重案傳真	Prosecution lawyer 控方律師	
1993	All About Tin	魔刀俠情	Master Tit-sum 鐵心師太	
1993	The Vampire Returns	大頭綠衣鬥殭屍	Yanluo Wang's second wife 閻羅王二姨太	
1993	The Legendary Ranger	原振俠	Yu Yan 如 茵	
1993	The Heroes from Shaolin	武尊少林	Miu Yum 妙 音	
1993	The Hero from Shanghai	梟情	Wang Tau-ping 汪秋萍	
1993	Can't Stop Loving You	愛到盡頭	Sister Mui, Tea shop owner 梅姐, 茶店老闆娘	TVB-produced TV movie
1994	File of Justice III	壹號皇庭 III	Tam Siu-lan, defendant 譚少蘭, 被告	
1994	Conscience	第三類法庭	The Prosecutor 主控官	
1994	Shade of Darkness	異度凶情	Fong Yin Sheung (wife of Yip Fat, wife of Cheung Chun Kong, mother of Yip Wai) 方燕嫦 (葉發之妻, 張振光之妻, 葉慧之母)	
1994	Plain Love	情濃大地	Ah Ying 阿 瑛	
1994	Love Is Blind	成日受傷的男人	Mrs Lam 林 太	
1994	Fate of the Clairvoyant	再見亦是老婆	May	
1994	Dead End	死角		TVB-produced TV movie
1995	Detective Investigation Files II	刑事偵緝檔案II	Yip Hung 葉 紅	
1995	The Holy Dragon Saga	箭俠恩仇	Mok Man 莫 問	
1995	The Condor Heroes 95	神鵰俠侶 1995	Mo Sam-leung 武三娘	
1995	A Stage of Turbulence	刀馬旦	Lee Sau-lin 李秀蓮	
1995	Passions Across Two Lifetimes	再世情未了	Aunt Cheung 祥婶	TVB-produced TV movie, co-production with Jumbo Plain Ltd.(大原).
1996	State of Divinity	笑傲江湖	Ling Chung-chak 寧中則	
1996	Dark Tales	聊齋: 古劍幽靈	Yu Shi 鴇 母	
1996	Dark Tales	聊齋: 翁婿鬥法	Ms. Weng 翁 妻	
1996	Dark Tales	聊齋: 秋月還陽	Sap Min-ne 十面尼	
1996	Dark Tales	聊齋: 狐仙報恩	Yu Shi 虞 氏	
1997	Detective Investigation Files III	刑事偵緝檔案 III		
1997	I Can't Accept Corruption	廉政追緝令		
1997	Mystery Files	迷離檔案	Fong (Mother of Lee Chi-Chiu and Lee Chi-kin) 芳 (李子超、李子建之母)	
1997	She Was Married to the Mob	虎膽虹威		TVB-produced TV movie
1997	The Hitman Chronicles - episode 7: Lui Sai-leung	大刺客 - 第七單元：呂四娘	One-armed God 獨臂神尼	
1997	Demi-Gods and Semi-Devils	天龍八部	Yip Yee-leung 葉二娘	
1997	The File of Justice V	壹號皇庭V	Chiu-Wong Mei-lin 趙王美蓮	
1997	Lady Flower Fist	苗翠花	Si Tai 師太	
1998	Time Off	生命有 TAKE 2(明天不一樣)	Mrs. Lee 李太	
1998	Journey to the West II	西遊記 II	Dragon Queen 龍王后	
1998	Dark Tales II	聊齋II：綠野飛仙	Aunt Yeung 楊大媽	
1998	Dark Tales II	聊齋II：花醉紅塵	Fox Spirit granny 狐狸婆婆	
1998	Dark Tales II	聊齋II：斬妖神劍	Fox Demon's mother 花姑子母	
1998	Old Time Buddy - To Catch a Thief	難兄難弟之神探李奇	Mook Sao-chun 木秀珍	
1998	Healing Hands	妙手仁心	Lee Pui-guen 李佩娟	
1998	A Kindred Spirit	真情	Cheung Yook-ting 張玉卿	
1999	Plain Love II	茶是故鄉濃	Sek Lui 石 蕾	
1999	Side Beat	吾係差人	梁秀蘭; Leung Sau-lan	
2000	Return of the Cuckoo	十月初五的月光 (澳門街)	Mary	
2000	Armed Reaction II	陀槍師姐 II	Lau Sook-yin 劉淑硏	
2000	Crimson Sabre	碧血劍	Aunt Hang 杏 姑	
2000	The Duke of the Mount Deer 2000	鹿鼎記	Gao Nan Si Tai (Princess Cheung Ping) 九難師太(長平公主)	
2000	When Dreams Come True	夢想成真	Sister Wah 華 姐	
2000	Lost In Love	大囍之家	Ho Qi-lai 何綺麗	
2000	War of the Genders	男親女愛	Ka Leung-fong 賈良方	
2001	Law Enforcers	勇探實錄	Mrs Chan 陳太	
2001	Armed Reaction III	陀槍師姐 III	Lai Sook-han 黎淑嫻	
2001	Colourful Life	錦繡良緣	Aunt Lin 蓮 嬸	
2001	Broadcast Life	FM701	Lam Yook-yan 林玉顏	
2001	Reaching Out	美麗人生	Koh-Lee Lai-ping 高李麗萍	
2002	Love Is Beautiful	無頭東宮	Innkeeper's wife (episode 9)	
2002	Good Against Evil	點指賊賊賊捉賊	Fisherman's wife 漁民妻	
2002	Take My Word For It	談判專家	Huo Yook-ching (Mother of Yip Ho-yan, Yip Ho-hei, Yip Ho-oi) 霍玉清 (葉可人, 葉可喜, 葉可愛之母)	
2002	Let's Face It	無考不成冤家	Anna, Ho Bik-yee's assistant Anna, 何碧儀助手	
2002	Where the Legend Begins	洛神	Lady San 辛大姑	
2002	Family Man	絕世好爸	Wendy	
2002	Virtues of Harmony	皆大歡喜	Merciless 鐵手無情	
2002	Square Pegs	戇夫成龍	Lee Sau-guen 李秀娟	
2003	Better Halves	金牌冰人	Wai Leung 慧 娘	
2003	Witness To A Prosecution II	洗冤錄II	San Lui-si 展呂氏	
2003	Triumph in the Skies	衝上雲霄	Taiwanese Guest 台灣客	
2003	Point of No Return	西關大少	Lady Suen 孫夫人	
2003	Virtues of Harmony II	皆大歡喜II	Sister Ha 霞 姐	
2004	The Conqueror's Story	楚漢驕雄	Aunt Fung 鳳 姑	
2004	Blade Heart	血薦軒轅	Leung Sau-kiu (Mrs Mang) 梁秀巧(孟大娘)	
2004	Shine On You	青出於藍	Sister Ngor 娥 姐	
2004	War and Beauty	金枝欲孽	Hou Gia-si 侯佳氏	
2005	The Charm Beneath	胭脂水粉	Sister Fuan 歡 姐	
2005	Life Made Simple	阿旺新傳	Sister-in-law Sheun 順 嫂	
2005	Placebo Cure	心理心裏有個謎	Lung Kam-wei's mother 龍錦威母	
2005	The Gentle Crackdown	秀才遇著兵	Aunt Ba 八 嬸	
2005	The Gâteau Affairs	情迷黑森林	Cook Yiu 曲 瑤	
2005	Into Thin Air	人間蒸發	Doctor Law 羅醫生	
2005	Fantasy Hotel	開心賓館	Townsfolk 鄉 里	
2005	Hidden Treasures	翻新大少	Wu Lai-wan 胡麗雲	
2006	Face to Fate	布衣神相	Taoist Siu Yeut, Head of Wong Shan School 曉月道人,"黃山派"掌門	
2006	Dicey Business	賭場風雲	Filipino grandma 菲籍婆婆	Guest appearance
2006	When Rules Turn Loose	識法代言人	Good Samaritan 好 人	
2006	Lethal Weapons of Love and Passion	覆雨翻雲	Gu Ning-ting 谷凝清	
2006	Bar Bender	潮爆大狀	Lee Fung-jing 李鳳貞	
2006	A Pillow Case of Mystery	施公奇案	Sengge Juk Ying 僧格卓英(卓英格格)	
2006	Trimming Success	飛短留長父子兵	Aunt Kwong 光 嬸	
2006	Forensic Heroes	法證先鋒	Lam Choi-yook 林彩玉	
2006	Love Guaranteed	愛情全保	Aunt Kin 堅 嬸	
2006	Maidens' Vow	鳳凰四重奏	Sister Lee 李 姐	
2006	CIB Files	刑事情報科	Sister Ying 英 姐	
2006	Land of Wealth	滙通天下	Gu Fan-fong 谷芬芳	
2007	ICAC Investigators 2007	廉政行動2007	So Lai-man 蘇麗雯; Case 3: Hundred Of Millions Of Trust/Billions of Credits 單元三: 億萬信用	
2007	The Brink of Law	突圍行動	Sister Ha 霞 姐	
2007	Best Bet	迎妻接福	Sister Gold 金 嫂	
2007	Best Selling Secrets	同事三分親	Kong Yut-ha / Mrs Chan 江日霞/陳 太	
2007	Heart of Greed	溏心风暴	Ho Yook-ling 何玉玲	
2007	Devil's Disciples	強劍	Blue-Eyed Silver Fox (Aunt Pui) 碧眼銀狐(佩姨)	
2007	The Ultimate Crime Fighter	通天幹探	Cheung Chau-ping 蔣秋萍	
2008	The Seventh Day	最美麗的第七天	Mrs. Teng (Teng Yut-long's mother) 程太 (程逸朗之母)	
2008	The Four	少年四大名捕	Dai Ha So 大蝦嫂	
2008	The Silver Chamber of Sorrows	銀樓金粉	Gan Lai-yam (Master of Sufferance) 簡麗音(苦難師太)	
2008	The Price of Greed	千謊百計	Aunt Chan 陳 嬸	
2008	Off Pedder	畢打自己人	Yu Sa-fei 余莎菲	
2008	The Money-Maker Recipe	師奶股神	Sister Lei 莉 姐	
2008	D.I.E. (Death Investigation Extension)	古靈精探	Drug Selling Party member 賣藥黨	
2008	The Gem of Life	珠光寶氣	Mrs Mak 麥太太	
2008	Pages of Treasures	Click入黃金屋	Mrs Ting 程 太	
2009	The Winter Melon Tale	大冬瓜	Thirteenth Mother of the South China Sea, Little Prince's martial arts master 南海十三娘, 小王爺之武功師傅	
2009	Beyond the Realm of Conscience	宮心計	Mamma Chui 徐媽媽	
2009	Burning Flame III	烈火雄心 III	Ng Mei-yu 吳美如	
2009	Sweetness in the Salt	碧血鹽梟	Mrs Dou 竇夫人	
2009	Man in Charge	幕後大老爺	Chan Yeuk-lan 陳若蘭	
2009	The Beauty of the Game	美麗高解像	Sze-to Lin-mei 司徒蓮美	
2009	72 Tenants of Prosperity	72家租客	Vegetable market lady 菜市阿姑	TVB-produced TV movie, co-production with Shaw Brothers (Hong Kong) Co., Ltd (邵氏兄弟) and Sil-Metropole Organisation Ltd. (銀都機構有限公司)
2010	The Mysteries of Love	談情說案	Director Chiu, National Leader and Physician of the "Hong Kong Federation of Chinese Medicine" 趙主任, 國家領導御用大國手 "香港中醫學中藥聯會" 中醫師	
2010	The Season of Fate	五味人生	Eighth concubine 八妗婆	
2010	Don Juan DeMercado	情人眼裏高一D	Judge 評 判	
2010	A Fistful of Stances	鐵馬尋橋	Twelfth Aunt 十二嬸	
2010	Suspects in Love	搜下留情	Big Grandma 大 婆	
2010	OL Supreme	女王辦公室	Law Officer 法 官	
2010	Sisters of Pearl	掌上明珠	Ng Oi-king 吳愛瓊	
2010	Can't Buy Me Love	公主嫁到	Aunt Mei 媚 姨	
2010	Gun Metal Grey	刑警	Wong Mei-ha 王美霞	
2010	Some Day	天天天晴	Ma Ho-man's mother 馬浩文母親	
2010	Twilight Investigation	囧探查過界	Chui Kai-fong 徐桂芳(Lulu)	
2011	7 Days in Life	隔離七日情	Poon Kwan-lan 潘君蘭	
2011	The Rippling Blossom	魚躍在花見	Bak Ho Lai Chi 白河莉子	
2011	Show Me the Happy	依家有喜	Mrs Chau 周太太	
2011	Yes, Sir. Sorry, Sir!	點解阿Sir係阿Sir	Choi Kiu 蔡 嬌	
2011	The Other Truth	真相	Tsang Kam-guen 曾金娟	
2011	River of Wine	九江十二坊	Chan Sam-mui/Aunt Cheng 陳三妹/鄭大媽	
2011	Guts of Man	蓋世孖寶	Wet nurse/nanny 鴇 母	
2011	Forensic Heroes III	法證先鋒III	Tam Mei-chi ( Mother of Jim, Jay and Jenny) 譚美芝(Jim, Jay, Jenny之母)	
2011	When Heaven Burns	天與地	Stella	
2011	Til Love Do Us Lie	結分@謊情式	Mrs Ho 何 太	
2011	Bottled Passion	我的如意狼君	Mamma Fung 鳳 媽	
2012	Queens of Diamonds and Hearts	東西宮略	Blind Woman 盲 婆	
2012	Daddy Good Deeds	當旺爸爸	Se Chi-man's mother 佘之曼之母	
2012	The Greatness of a Hero	盛世仁傑	Cheng Ping 鄭 萍	
2012	Three Kingdoms RPG	回到三國	Host of Bak Lin Sin Guan 白蓮仙館主持	
2012	Tiger Cubs	飛虎	Ho Yee-mui (Aunt Hing) 何二妹(興嬸)	
2012	Ghetto Justice II	怒火街頭II	Chan Yin-sau 陳燕秀	
2012	Highs and Lows	雷霆掃毒	Tang Sai-nui 鄧細女	
2012	Silver Spoon, Sterling Shackles	名媛望族	Law Bing-man 羅冰雯	
2012	The Confidant	大太監	Kwok Qin-si (Kwok San-wing's mother) 郭秦氏 (郭善榮之母)	
2012	Missing You	幸福摩天輪	Wong Siu-fan 王少芬	
2013	The Day of Days	初五啟市錄	Third Aunt 三姨婆	
2013	Sergeant Tabloid	女警愛作戰	Cheng Kit 鄭 潔	
2013	Bullet Brain	神探高倫布	Bao Ping-on's mother 包平安之母	
2013	Beauty at War	金枝慾孽貳	Kwok Luo-law Bo-ying 郭絡羅·寶櫻	
2013	Slow Boat Home	情越海岸線	Fung Yook-yan 馮玉嫣	
2013	Come Home Love (Part One)	愛·回家 (第一輯)	Ms Ku (episode 288), Grandma Chui (episode 447) 顧小姐(第288集)、崔老太(第447集)	
2013	Always and Ever	情逆三世緣	Chu Yiu-mui 朱么妹	
2013	Brother's Keeper	巨輪	Aunt Fong 方 姨	
2013	The Hippocratic Crush II	On Call 36小時II	Lui Siu-bing 呂小冰	
2013	I Love Hong Kong 2013	2013我愛HK恭囍發財	Neighbour 街坊	TVB-produced TV movie, co-production with Shaw Brothers (Hong Kong) Co., Ltd (邵氏兄弟)
2014	Shades of Life - Episode 7: Dream Dwelling	我們的天空 - 第7集: 蝸居夢	Mrs Kwok (Kwok Lai-ching's mother) 郭 太 (郭麗青之母)	
2014	Storm in a Cocoon	守業者	Kam Lan 甘 蘭	
2014	ICAC Investigators 2014	廉政行動2014	Betty Lai/Lai Kit-yee's mother Betty Lai/黎潔兒之母	
2014	Never Dance Alone	女人俱樂部	Aunt Wan 雲 姨	
2014	Black Heart White Soul	忠奸人	Sister Lee; Lee姐	
2014	Rear Mirror	載得有情人	Sister Ping 萍 姐	
2014	Tomorrow Is Another Day	再戰明天	Yau Ming-yim 邱明艷	
2014	Come On, Cousin	老表，你好hea！	Sister Ma 馬姐	
2014	Overachievers	名門暗戰	Chan Sau-jing 陳秀貞	
2014	Lady Sour	醋娘子	Aunt Chong 莊大娘	
2015	Madam Cutie On Duty	師奶 MADAM	Mang Po 孟 婆	
2015	Romantic Repertoire	水髮胭脂	Sister Lai 麗 姐	
2015	Limelight Years	華麗轉身	Chau Mo-long's wife 周舜郎之妻	Guest appearance
2015	Momentary Lapse Of Reason	收規華	Aunt Lai 麗 姑	
2015	Captain of Destiny	張保仔	Grandma Yiu 姚婆婆	
2015	Under the Veil	無雙譜	Lady Kong 江夫人	
2015	With or Without You	東坡家事	Hon Tai-kwan 韓太君	
2015	Angel In-the-Making	實習天使	Chan Yuet-ying 陳月英	
2016	The Last Healer in Forbidden City	末代御醫	Grandma Yu 余嬤嬤	
2016	My Dangerous Mafia Retirement Plan	火線下的江湖大佬	Sister Dat 德 姐	
2016	Come Home Love: Dinner at 8	愛·回家之八時入席	Gu Mei-chau 顧美秋	
2016	Between Love & Desire	完美叛侶	Lau Man-kiu 劉曼嬌	
2016	A Fist Within Four Walls	城寨英雄	Gambler 賭 徒	
2016	Inspector Gourmet	為食神探	Aunt Do 杜 嬸	
2016	Two Steps from Heaven	幕後玩家	Jackie's mother Jackie之母	
2016	No Reserve	巾帼枭雄之谍血长天	Aunt Kin 堅 嬸	
2017	May Fortune Smile On You	財神駕到	Lam Tut-mui 林七妹	
2017	Destination Nowhere	迷		
2017	Married but Available	我瞞結婚了	Sister Tai 娣 姐	
2017	Phoenix Rising	蘭花刼	Yan Hong Nim Ti 炎熊念慈	
2017	Bet Hur	賭城群英會	Mrs Chan (Chan Siu-lung's mother) 陳媽 (陳小龍之母)	
2017	Line Walker: The Prelude	使徒行者II	Tang Suet-lan 鄧雪蘭	
2017	The Exorcist's Meter	降魔的	Aunt Fa 花 姑	
2017	My Ages Apart	誇世代	Grandma 婆 婆	Guest appearance
2018	Apple-colada	果欄中的江湖大嫂	Lee Wai-guen 李慧娟	
2018	Birth Of A Hero	翻生武林	Mo Ding Fei Ling 無定飛玲	
2018	Life on the Line	跳躍生命線	Bus Lady 大巴姐	
2019	As Time Goes By	好日子	Aunt Tin 田 嬸	
2019	Come Home Love: Lo and Behold	愛·回家之開心速遞	Lady Nam Guan 南宮夫人	
2019	Our Unwinding Ethos	十二傳說	Ling Bo-bo 凌寶寶	
2019	My Life As Loan Shark	街坊財爺	Yook 玉	
2019	Barrack O'Karma	金宵大廈	Grandma Chui 徐老太	
2019	Finding Her Voice	牛下女高音	Master Cheung/Group Leader 張師傅/團 長	
2019	Handmaidens United	丫鬟大聯盟	Sung Man-dang's mother 宋晚燈之母	Guest appearance
2020	The Dripping Sauce	大醬園	Tao Sam 陶 三	
2020	Forensic Heroes IV	法證先鋒IV	Grandma Tao 淘婆婆	
2020	Airport Strikers	機場特警	Sung Lee-si (Sung Tin-kei's mother) 宋李氏/宋天機之母	
2020	Flying Tiger II	飛虎之雷霆極戰	Aunt Lan (Tong Wing-fei's mother) 蘭 姨 (唐永飛之母)	TVB TV drama, co-production with Shaw Brothers Pictures International Limited (邵氏兄弟國際影業有限公司)

=== Television (ATV) ===
Asia Television (ATV)
Year	English Title	Chinese Title	Role	Notes
1982	Blood Debt	血債血償	Chor Seung-yee 楚湘兒	
1983	Fly Over the Ring	飛越擂台		
1983	101 Citizen Arrest	101拘捕令	Ho Yook-kam 何玉琴	
1983	Super Hero	鐵膽英雄	Do Sam-leung 杜三娘	
1984	The Great General Nian Geng-yao	清宮劍影錄之大將軍年羹堯	Chan Mei-leung 陳美娘	
1984	Drunken Fist II	醉拳王无忌之日帝月后	Aunt Suet 雪姑	
1985	House Man	住家男人	Lai Sai-nui 黎細女	
1985	Shanghai Bund Boss	上海灘老大	Law Chau-lan 羅秋蘭	ATV-produced TV movie
1986	Tung Ling	通靈	Mrs Tong 唐太	
1987	The Devil Force	天將魔星	Fa Man-piu 花漫飄	
1989	Legal Passion	法律情		ATV-produced TV movie

=== Television (RTHK) ===
Radio Television Hong Kong - (RTHK)
Year	English Title	Chinese Title	Role	Notes
1980	Light and Shadow in My City - 'Under the Roof: Gap'	光影我城 - '屋簷下：夾縫'	Julie	Presenter: Ivan Ho Sau-sun 演講者: 何守信
1980	Light and Shadow in My City II - episode 24 'Branding: The Half Life of Kam Chi'	光影我城 II - 第二十四集 '烙印: 金枝的半生'	Yung Kam Chi 容金枝	Presenter: Dominic Lam Ka-wah 演講者: 林嘉華

=== Television (CTV) ===
Commercial Television - JiayiTV (CTV)
Year	English Title	Chinese Title	Role	Notes
1976	The Legend of the Condor Heroes	射鵰英雄傳		
1978	The Bride with White Hair	白髮魔女傳	Lien Yi-seung (Yook Law-sa) 練霓裳 (玉羅剎)	

=== Television (International TV) ===
International Television
Year	Country	Title	Role	Notes
1974	Germany	Heisse Ware aus Hong Kong	Herself 她自己	TV film documentary co-production with ZDF (Zweites Deutsches Fernsehen) in West Germany. Filmed in Hong Kong. 第二德國電視台. 在香港拍攝
1984	Taiwan	驀然回首 (Suddenly Looking Back)	Bu Guo-keung 卜果強	Taiwanese TV series on China Television, abbreviated as "China TV", CTV 台灣電視劇, 中國電視公司, 簡稱 "中視", CTV.
1986	Taiwan	飛象過河 (Elephant Flying Across the River)	Lung Dai-leung 龍大娘	Taiwanese TV series on Chinese Television System, abbreviated as "Chinese TV", CTS. 台灣電視劇, 中華電視公司, 簡稱 "華視", CTS.
1986	Taiwan	少林弟子 (Shaolin Disciple)	Dou Wan-leung 杜芸娘	Taiwanese TV series on Chinese Television System, abbreviated as "Chinese TV", CTS. 台灣電視劇, 中華電視公司, 簡稱 "華視", CTS.

=== Films (Shaw Brothers Studios) ===
Shaw Brothers Studios (邵氏兄弟)
Year	English Title	Chinese Title	Role	Notes
1964	The Last Woman of Shang	妲己	Dancing girl 舞女	
1964	The Warlord and the Actress	血濺牡丹紅		
1965	The Mermaid	魚美人	Chiu Chu, maid 侍女	
1965	The Lotus Lamp	寶蓮燈	Fairy 仙女	
1965	Squadron 77	七七敢死隊		
1966	Come Drink with Me	大醉俠	Woman Escort Soldier 女兵	
1966	The Knight of Knights	文素臣	San Yin 新燕	
1966	Dawn Will Come	魂斷奈何天	Hao-yee 巧兒	
1966	Princess Iron Fan	鐵扇公主	Princess's maid	
1967	Too Late for Love	烽火萬里情	Chan Su-fan	
1967	The Goddess of Mercy	觀世音	Palace maid 宮女僕	
1967	That Tender Age	少年十五二十時		
1967	The Dragon Creek	龍虎溝	Hei Chi 喜子	
1967	The King with My Face	鐵頭皇帝	Hang-yee 杏兒	
1968	That Fiery Girl	紅辣椒	Siu Fa 小花	
1968	Spring Blossoms	春暖花開	Chan Mei-yook 陳美玉	
1968	The Enchanted Chamber	狐俠	Wu Siu-lai 胡小麗	
1969	Tropicana Interlude	椰林春戀	Lee Oi-yung 李愛蓉	
1970	Apartment for Ladies	女子公寓	Jenny Chun-nei 珍妮	
1970	The Heroic Ones	十三太保	Chui Yin 翠燕	
1970	Love Song Over the Sea	海外情歌	Man Chu	
1970	The Wandering Swordsman	遊俠兒	Kong Ling 江灵	
1971	Six Assassins	六刺客	Suen Mei-jing 孫美貞	
1971	Shadow Girl	隱身女俠	Shadow Girl An Chu 銀姝	
1971	The Champion of Champions	大地龍蛇	Wong Siu-ha 王小霞	
1972	The Deadly Knives	落葉飛刀	Kiu Kiu 嬌嬌	
1972	Four Riders	四騎士	Man Si	
1973	The Bastard	小雜種	Hsiao Yi / Little Beggar	
1973	Police Force	警察	Sum Yin 沈燕	
1973	The Iron Bodyguard	大刀王五	Tam Kiu, Tam Si-tong's sister 譚喬	
1973	The Delinquent	憤怒青年	Elaine Wong Lan 黃蘭	
1974	Call Him Mr. Shatter	奪命刺客	Mai Mee	Co-production with Hammer Film Productions
1974	Scandal	醜聞	Ms Chau 周小姐	
1974	Friends	朋友	Ko Xin 高鑫	
1974	Rivals of Kung Fu	黃飛鴻義取丁財炮	Chan Dai-mui 陳大妹	
1975	Black Magic	降頭	Wong Kuk-ying 王菊英	
1976	The Web of Death	五毒天羅	Fan Chau-sum 范秋心	
1976	Oily Maniac	油鬼子	Siu Lai 肖麗	
1976	The Magic Blade	天涯明月刀	Yu Kam 俞琴	
1976	Challenge of the Masters	陸阿采與黃飛鴻	Sau Lin 秀蓮	
1976	Crazy Sex	拈花惹草	Ling Ling 玲玲	
1976	Brotherhood	江湖子弟	Kam Yin 金燕	
1976	Black Magic, Part II	勾魂降頭	Margaret 瑪嘉烈	
1976	The Condemned	死囚	Bo-yum 寶音	
1977	The Criminals, Part 5 - The Teenager's Nightmare	姦魔	Ah Fun 阿芬	
1977	Jade Tiger	白玉老虎	Chiu Tin-tin 趙千千	
1977	Executioners from Shaolin	洪熙官	Fong Wing-chun 方永春	
1978	Swordsman and Enchantress	蕭十一郎	Lady Fung 風四娘	
1978	Shaolin Mantis	螳螂	Wang Shi, Tin Gi Gi's mother 汪氏, 田芝芝之母	
1978	Soul of the Sword	殺絕	Sword Lady of Lok Yueng 洛陽劍姑娘	
1979	The Deadly Breaking Sword	風流斷劍小小刀	Law Kam-fa 羅金花	
1979	The Scandalous Warlord	軍閥趣史	Secretary 女祕書	
1979	Abbot of Shaolin	少林英雄榜	Wu Mei 五枚	
1980	Swift Sword	情俠追風劍	Lang Chau-ha 冷秋霞	
1981	One Way Only	單程路	Chang Ming Cai's wife	
1981	What Price Honesty?	目無王法	Ying Ho's wife 英豪之妻	
1982	The Fake Ghost Catchers	鬼畫符	Mrs Lin Huanzhu	
1982	Curse of Evil	邪咒	Shi Yook-mei 施玉美	
1982	Clan Feuds	大旗英雄傳	Lang Chau-ping 冷秋萍	
1982	The Brave Archer and His Mate	神鵰俠侶	Hon Siu-ying, from The Seven Freaks of Gong-nam 韓小瑩, 江南七怪	
1984	Long Road to Gallantry	游俠情	Chief Leng Tian Lei's wife	
1984	The Eight Diagram Pole Fighter	五郎八卦棍	Se Choi-fa 佘賽花	
1984	I Will Finally Knock You Down, Dad!	望子成蟲	Lady Chan 陳夫人	
1985	Disciples of the 36th Chamber	霹靂十傑	Miu Chui-fa 苗翠花	

=== Films (Independent Film Studios) ===
Independent Film Studios
Year	English Title	Chinese Title	Role	Notes
1978	A Hero's Tears	英雄有淚		Sing Hai Film (H.K.) Co. Pty Ltd 新海影業(香港)公司
1978	My Blade, My Life	決鬥者的生命	Yao Feng	Man Kwok Film Company 萬國電影公司
1979	Relentless Broken Blade/Lyrical Blades	斷劍無情	Mercury 水銀	
1979	One Foot Crane	獨腳鶴	Fung Lin-yi, one-legged crane 馮漣漪, 獨腳鶴	Wu's Film Co. Ltd., You Li Film (Hong Kong) Co. 巫氏影業有限公司, 有利電影(香港)公司
1979	Crazy Couple	無招勝有招	Piu-hung 飄紅	Aau Sik 銀色
1979	The Challenger	踢館	Wei Ching-fung 韋青鳳	Lo Wei Motion Picture Co., Ltd. 羅維影業有限公司
1980	Carry on Wise Guy	破戒大師	Ying-ying 盈盈	Lau Brother Co. (L&B), Golden Princess Film Production 劉氏兄弟影業公司, 金公主電影製作有限公司
1980	Daggers 8	空手入白刃	Fong Chi	Honest Films (H.K.) Co. 香港合誠影業公司
1980	The Young Master	師弟出馬	Sister Sau, Chief Sheriff Sang Kwan's daughter 秀姐, 鐵補頭之女	Golden Harvest Productions (Hong Kong) 嘉禾(香港)有限公司
1980	Eight Escorts	八絕	Sun Ching	Nam Keung Film (H.K.) Company 香港南強影業有限公司
1980	The Loot	賊贓	Kong Fei-Ha 江飛霞	Good Year Movie Co. (Goodyear Movie Company) 豐年影業公司
1980	Lonely Famous Sword	孤獨名劍		Friend Limited Company 朋友有限公司
1980	Qiu Gang-She and White Thief Seven	邱岡舍與白賊七		
1981	Beauty Escort	護花鈴	Kwok Yook-ha, Long Fei's wife, Nam Guan-ping's younger sister 郭玉霞, 龍飛之妻, 南宮平之師妹	Lin Chun Film Company, Yu Fung Film Company, Lien Sing Film 聯真影業有限公司, 裕豐(香港)影業公司, 聯興影業公司
1981	The Executor	執法者	Yung Tin-pang's wife 容天鵬之妻	Wai Yip 偉業電影公司
1981	Red Rattlesnake	赤色響尾蛇		
1981	Dreadnaught	勇者無懼	Mousy's sister	Golden Harvest Productions (Hong Kong) 嘉禾(香港)有限公司
1983	The Pier	碼頭		Bang! Bang! Films (Hong Kong) 繽繽影業有限公司
1983	The Perfect Wife?!	專撬牆腳	Student 學生	Cinema City Company Limited (Hong Kong) 新藝城影業有限公司
1983	Mission to Kill	火拼油尖區		Taai Daat (Hong Kong) 泰達
1983	Lost Generation	風水二十年	Concert guest 演唱會嘉賓	Gong Cheung Chik Aau (Hong Kong) 廣場縱藝
1984	Majestic Thunderbolt	霹靂智多星	[Red Rattlesnake (1981) footage]	IFD Films & Arts Ltd. 通用影藝有限公司
1985	Those Merry Souls	時來運轉	Auntie Pearl 珍珠姨	Bo Ho Films Co., Ltd., Golden Harvest Productions (Hong Kong) 寶禾影業有限公司, 嘉禾(香港)有限公司
1986	The Innocent Interloper	流氓英雄	Ms Ng 吳小姐	Always Good Film Co., Ltd. 永佳影業有限公司
1987	Escape from Black Street	槍下留人		Xuefu Co., Ltd. 學甫有限公司
1989	Avenging Trio	火爆行動	Madam	Jia's Motion Picture (H.K.) Co. 嘉氏影業(香港)公司
1990	My Hero	一本漫畫闖天涯	Heung, Brother Yi's wife 香, 義哥之妻	Chun Sing Film Co. 浚昇影業公司
1991	Red Shield	雷霆掃穴		Magnum Films Limited, Golden Princess Amusement Co., Ltd. (Hong Kong) 萬能影業有限公司, 金公主娛樂有限公司
1993	Hong Kong Eva	夢情人	Tong's sister (cameo role)	Super Power Motion Picture Co. 新力量動畫製作社
1993	Sam the Iron Bridge 1: White Lotus Cult	白蓮邪神	Aunt Hung 红姑	Citimedia Limited, Long Shong Pictures Ltd. 先達電影公司, 龍祥影業有限公司
1993	Sam the Iron Bridge 2 - Champion of Martial Arts	武狀元鐵橋三	Aunt Hung 红姑	Citimedia Limited, Long Shong Pictures Ltd. 先達電影公司, 龍祥影業有限公司
1994	Sam the Iron Bridge 3: One Arm Hero	壯士斷臂	Aunt Hung 红姑	Sil-Metropole Organisation Ltd. 銀都機構有限公司
1995	Shaolin Kung Fu Kids	笑林老祖	Aunt Ng 吳阿姨	Ming Wai 名威
1995	Once in a Lifetime	終身大事	Jing Yee's mother	Good Standard International Ltd., Golden Harvest Productions (Hong Kong) 新標準國際有限公司, 嘉禾(香港)有限公司
2000	Those Were the Days...	友情歲月山雞故事	Sister Kam (Mother of Lou Wing-chi and Lou Wing-hou 金姐 (駱詠芝，駱詠濠之母)	FBI TV and Film Group Company Limited (Film Business International Ltd.), Yun Man Entertainment Company Limited; FBI友情歲月影視集團有限公司, 潤萬娛樂有限公司
2006	2 Become 1	天生一對	Mrs Leung (Bingo's mother) 梁太(梁冰傲之母)	Media Asia Film Company Limited, Milkyway Image (HK) Ltd., 寰亞電影有限公司, 銀河映像(香港)有限公司
2013	The Fox Lover	白狐	Twelfth mother 十二娘	
2013	Control	控制	Grim Nurse 冷酷護士	Sil-Metropole Organisation Ltd., Huayi Brothers Media Co., Ltd. 銀都機構有限公司, 華誼兄弟傳媒有限公司
2017	Returning Love	再渡情缘		Longsheng BRICS Media, Star Heli Media 龍盛金磚傳媒, 星辰合力傳媒

== Awards and achievements ==
Year	Category	Nominated work	Result
TVB Anniversary Awards 2003	My Favourite Powerhouse Actress of the Year (Best Supporting Actress) 本年度我最喜愛的實力非凡女藝員 (最佳女配角)	Wai Leung in Better Halves 慧 娘, 金牌冰人	Nominated
TVB Anniversary Awards 2004	My Favourite Powerhouse Actress of the Year (Best Supporting Actress) 本年度我最喜愛的實力非凡女藝員 (最佳女配角)	Leung Sau-kiu (Mrs Mang) in Blade Heart 梁秀巧(孟大娘), 血薦軒轅	Nominated
2018	TVB Honorary Award	Long-term Service and Outstanding Employee Honour Award: 30 years service 長期服務暨傑出員工榮譽大獎: 30年服務	Won
