= The Blood Hounds =

- Also known as: The Bloodhounds
- Chinese: 大唐名捕
- Genre: Historical drama
- Directed by: Yeung Kam-chuan
- Starring: Francis Ng, Fiona Leung, Andy Tai Chi-wai, Josephine Lam, Sam Kam Kwok-wai, Lily Li, Yeung De-shi
- Opening theme: performed by Andy Hui and Tong Mei-kwan
- Country of origin: Hong Kong
- Original language: Cantonese
- No. of episodes: 20

Production
- Producer: Leung Kim-ho
- Production location: Hong Kong
- Editor: Leung Kim-ho
- Running time: 43 minutes per episode
- Production company: TVB

Original release
- Network: TVB Jade
- Release: 1990

The Blood Hounds is a Hong Kong historical drama television series set during the Tang dynasty about three friends, Pei Yi-fei (Francis Ng), Chun-Yu Zi-hong (Andy Tai Chi-wai) and Song Hien (Sam Kam Kwok-wai) and the plot to assist the Emperor's son Li Longji to seize power from Empress Wei. The series was first broadcast on TVB Jade in Hong Kong in 1990, and starred Francis Ng, Andy Tai Chi-wai, Fiona Leung, Josephine Lam, Sam Kam Kwok-wai, Lily Li and Yeung De-shi.

== Synopsis ==
During the Zhonglong period of Emperor Zhongzong in the Tang Dynasty, the two imperial criminal detectives Pei Yi-fei (Francis Ng), Chun-Yu Zi-hong (Tai Chi-wei) are in charge of solving crimes on either side of the town. Both detectives rely on the female informant Sheung-Guan Jing-jing (Josephine Lam) for relevant information and tip-offs in criminal cases, however, she is in love with Pei Yi-fei and would often give him first preference. The two detectives also have a good friend in the doctor Song Hien (Sam Kam Kwok-wai) and seek his assistance in autopsies, poisons and treatments.

When a mysterious woman Mak Gok-yi (Fiona Leung) arrives in the town and opens a wine bar and lounge, the three friends fall in love with her. Mak Gok-yi only shows interest in Pei Yi-fei, so Song Hien retreats but Chun-Yu Zi-hong continues to seek her affections. Chun-Yu Zi-hong grows angry, jealous and envious of Pei Yi-fei and seeks to destroy him. Pei Yi-fei's younger sister Pei Ling (Yiu Cheng-ching) is in love with Chun-Yu Zi-hong and would not listen to her brother's warnings about Chun-Yu Zi-hong.

Song Hien assists the widow Tai Mu-lan (Betsy Cheung Fung-nei) and her young daughter, then begins a relationship with Mu-lan. Sheung-Guan Jing-jing meets Li Longji (Yeung De-shi) and the two become friends but she does not yet know he is the Emperor's nephew and future emperor. Chun-Yu Zi-hong feels his detective career is not enough and schemes his way to the top ranks to work for Empress Wei (Lily Li).Empress Wei seizes power, poisons the Emperor and takes control of the dynasty. Li Longji plots to seize power from Empress Wei with help from Sheung-Guan Jing-jing, Pei Yi-fei, and Wu Kei (Cheng Yan-lai). As Li Longji is the new Emperor, Chun-Yu Zi-hong flees the palace to join the Ghost Gang led by the Golden Demon King (Yip Tin-hung). Chun-Yu Zi-hong continues to deal with Pei Yi-fei and kills Song Hien, and indirectly kills Pei Yi-fei's sister Pei Ling. Pei Yi-fei is devastated over her death and vows revenge.

== Cast ==
Note: Some of the characters' names are in Cantonese romanisation.

- Francis Ng as Pei Yi-fei
- Fiona Leung as Mak Gok-yi
- Andy Tai Chi-wai as Chun-Yu Zi-hong
- Josephine Lam as Sheung-Guan Jing-jing
- Sam Kam Kwok-wai as Song Hien
- Lily Li as Empress Wei
- Betsy Cheung Fung-nei as Tai Mu-lan
- Yiu Cheng-ching as Pei Ling
- Yeung De-shi as Li Longji
- Yip Tin-hung as Golden Demon King
- Cheng Yan-lai as Wu Kei
- Bak Man-biu as Chui Ye
- Mai Hao-wei as Li Dan
