= Jacqueline Wong =

Hong Kong actress and television host (born 1989)

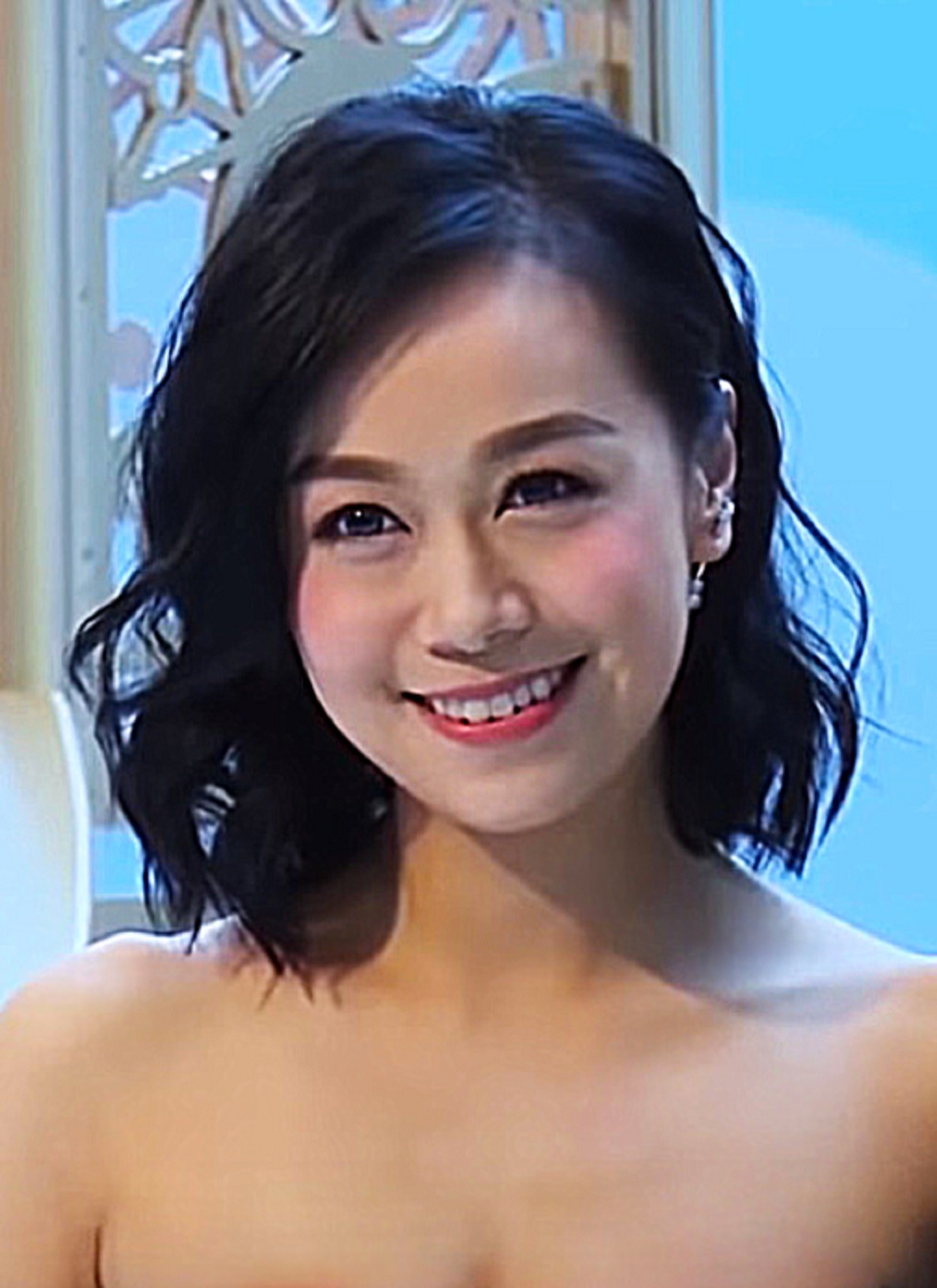
- Wong in 2017
- Born: 23 January 1989 (age 37); New York City, U.S.
- Citizenship: United States; Canada; Hong Kong
- Education: University of British Columbia
- Occupations: Actress; host; singer
- Years active: 2012–2019, 2023–present
- Relatives: Scarlett Wong (sister)
- Awards: Miss Hong Kong 2012 – Miss Hong Kong 1st Runner-up StarHub TVB Awards 2017 – My Favourite TVB Supporting Actress

Chinese name
- Traditional Chinese: 黃心穎
- Simplified Chinese: 黄心颖
Transcriptions
Standard Mandarin
- Hanyu Pinyin: Huáng Xinyǐng
Yue: Cantonese
- Jyutping: Wong^{4} Sum^{1}wing

Jacqueline Wong Sum-wing (Chinese: 黃心穎, born 23 January 1989) is a Hong Kong actress, TV host and beauty pageant titleholder. She won the Miss Hong Kong 2012 first runner-up title and placed in the top 12 talents at Miss World 2013. In 2022, her contract with TVB ended.

== Life and career ==
=== 1989–2012: Early years ===
On 23 January 1989, Wong was born in New York City. She is the youngest sister of four, with Scarlett Wong (artiste and former host of ViuTV) as her elder sister. At the age of seven, she moved and settled in Vancouver with her family. In 2012, Wong was attending the University of British Columbia, studying her Master of Business Administration before competing for Miss Hong Kong 2012. Raised by her Cantonese family in the United States and Canada, Wong is fluent in English and Cantonese.

=== 2012–2018: Beauty pageants & TVB career ===
Wong competed at Miss Hong Kong 2012 and won the first runner-up title. In the following year, she represented Hong Kong for Miss World 2013 and placed on the top 12 talents. Like all beauty pageant winners, she was offered a contract with TVB and received training to become an entertainer. Wong had starred in 14 TVB dramas since 2013. She won My Favourite TVB Supporting Actress at the 2017 StarHub TVB Awards.

=== 2019–2021: Taxi Infidelity Scandal with Andy Hui ===
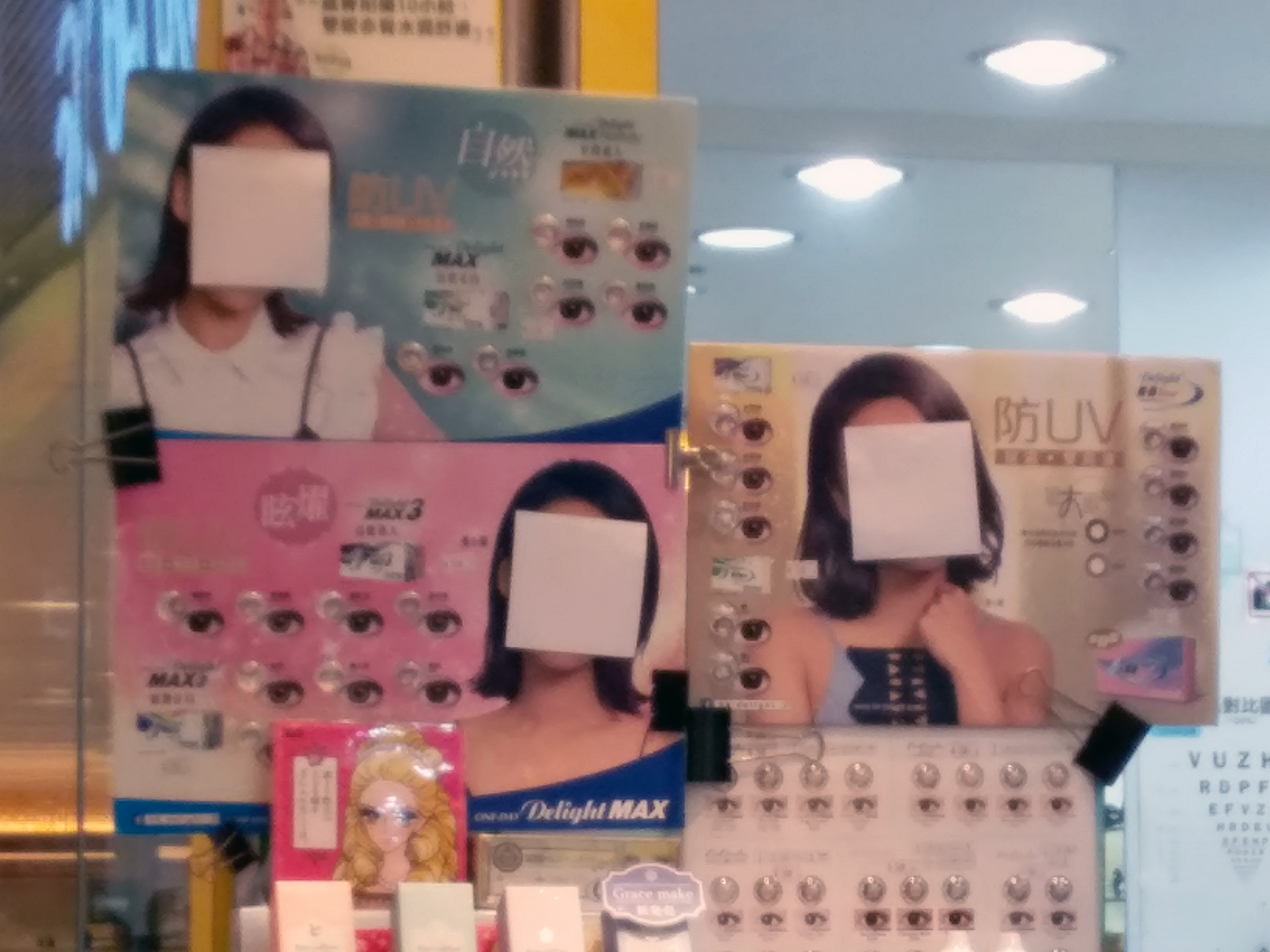
Ads with Wong's likeness blotted out in the wake of the scandal

On 16 April 2019, Wong received heavy media exposure for her physical intimacies with married Hong Kong singer and actor Andy Hui; dubbing it "安心". At the time of the incident, Hui was married to singer-actress Sammi Cheng and Wong was in a steady relationship with actor Kenneth Ma. The two shared a taxi ride, where they passionately kissed while being recorded by the taxi's in-vehicle camera. The video was later made public by various news outlets. Since the scandal broke, Wong blocked comments from her social media accounts after her posts were flooded with negative comments and publicly apologized on social media: "I can’t face myself and do not know how to face my family, Kenneth Ma, friends, company and colleagues... I don’t dare to ask everyone for forgiveness, and only beseech everyone to give some space to all the people who have been implicated."

Wong's public image was tarnished and promotions using her image were removed or blocked. She and Ma ended their relationship and Wong returned overseas to Los Angeles for 8 months to avoid public scrutiny and tabloids. During her hiatus, Wong’s scenes in the drama Forensic Heroes IV were re-shot with Roxanne Tong, who began dating Ma in 2020. While Andy Hui is able to salvage his career, Wong's filming career was halted.

After her 8-month hiatus, the dramas Finding Her Voice (牛下女高音) and Handmaiden United (丫鬟大聯盟), in which Wong played major roles, were aired to gauge the public's reaction; the series were met with low ratings. During the promotion of the dramas, she was visibly absent. When reporters asked about any comeback plans or change of careers, she replied she had no plans nor thoughts of it.

In June 2023, she would make her first public interview. She explained in the aftermath of the scandal, her initial reaction was to avoid reality by resting all day. She experienced uncontrollable crying, feeling unmotivated, and depressed. She realized she needed help and enrolled in acting classes to keep herself occupied. She credited her recovery thanks to the support of her family and adopting her dog. It was originally speculated that TVB completely froze her career until her contract was over; she clarified that the station eventually invited her back to filming dramas and variety shows but she declined and took change in her career instead.

=== 2022–2024: Leaving TVB & singing career ===
After a three-year hiatus, Wong's contract with TVB eventually ended in July 2022. A free agent, she has yet to return to acting. She has been dating Rubberband drummer Lai Man Wang (泥鯭) and the two live together at Wong's home. Wong would make her unannounced return to the entertainment industry with a shift to singing. She explained music was the only thing that helped her release her emotions and didn't know what else she could do. With the help of Lai Man Wang, she produced two singles. On Valentines Day (Tue, Feb 14, 2023), Jacqueline released a music video titled "Crown Me" (English song) with lyrics that addresses some of the criticisms she's received and her readiness to move on. During July, Jacqueline held a fan meeting to promote her new singles at Yahoo Live! Unfortunately, public reception was low as only three fans attended and online netizens were critical of her return. On Oct 27th, Jacqueline married Lai Man Wang. They hosted the wedding at Yuen Long at a hotel banquet for an outdoor ceremony with family and close friends.

== Filmography ==
=== Television series ===
| Year | English Title | Chinese Title | Role | Notes |
|---|---|---|---|---|
| 2013 | The Hippocratic Crush II | On Call 36小時 II | Sum Wan-kam (沈韵琴) | Guest (episodes 19 and 20) |
| 2014 | The Ultimate Addiction | 點金勝手 | Chow San-lai (周辛麗) | |
| 2014 | Tomorrow Is Another Day | 再戰明天 | Man Sheung-yau (文上游) | |
| 2015 | Madam Cutie On Duty | 師奶MADAM | Lui Fong (呂芳) | |
| 2015 | Smooth Talker | 以和為貴 | Angie Wu Chi-pak (胡姿柏) | |
| 2015 | Limelight Years | 華麗轉身 | Law Tsz-wing (羅子穎) | |
| 2015 | With or Without You | 東坡家事 | So Siu-mui (蘇小妹) | |
| 2016 | Inspector Gourmet | 為食神探 | Chow Ching (周晴) | |
| 2017 | Provocateur | 與諜同謀 | Mani Cheuk Man-li (卓敏莉) | |
| 2017 | Nothing Special Force | 雜警奇兵 | Guk Tsz-ching (谷芷晴) | |
| 2018 | Deep in the Realm of Conscience | 宮深計2深宮計 | Kam Yeuk-chin (甘若芊) | |
| 2019 | Finding Her Voice | 牛下女高音 | Bak Suet-yee (白雪兒) | |
| 2019 | Handmaidens United | 丫鬟大聯盟 | Yuet Ying (月盈) | |
| 2020 | The Offliners | 堅離地愛堅離地 | Ting Shun-yan (丁信恩) | |

=== Variety shows ===
| Year | English Title | Chinese Title | Notes |
|---|---|---|---|
| 2012 | Minute to Win It | 决战一分钟 | |
| 2013 -2018 | Sidewalk Scientist | 學是學非 | |
| 2016 | I Love HK | 我愛香港 | |
| 2017 | Sammy on the Go | 森美旅行团 | |
| 2019 | Pok Oi Charity Show | 博爱欢乐传万家 | |

== Awards ==
| Year | Award | Award |
|---|---|---|
| 2012 | Miss Hong Kong Pageant | First Runner-Up |
| 2014 | Yahoo！Asia Buzz Awards | Most Popular Female TV Artiste |
| 2017 | StarHub TVB Awards | My Favourite TVB Supporting Actress |

== Discography ==
| Year | Song Name | Collaborators |
|---|---|---|
| 2014 | "We Are the Only One" | TVB Artists |
| 2016 | "Amazing Summer 乘风" | TVB Artists |
| 2017 | "I Was Here" | Sisley Choi, Crystal Fung, Veronica Shiu, Bowie Cheung |
| 2018 | "In My Heart" | Single |
| 2023 | "Crown Me" | Single |
