= Dark Tales =

Hong Kong drama television series

- Genre: Period drama Supernatural drama Horror; Romance
- Written by: Ting Shan-hsi (I); Leung Wing-mui (II); Leung Kim-ho (II); Based on the works of Pu Songling
- Theme music composer: William Wu (I); Mahmood Rumjahn (II)
- Opening theme: I: Kak Sai Ching (隔世情) by Cass Phang; II: Ji Dong Si Gor Mung (只當是個夢) by Cass Phang
- Country of origin: Hong Kong
- Original language: Cantonese
- No. of episodes: 75 (I–II)

Production
- Producers: Lau Sze-yu (I–II); Chou Ling-kang (I)
- Production locations: Hong Kong; Taiwan
- Camera setup: Multi-camera
- Running time: 45 mins. (each)
- Production company: TVB

Original release
- Network: Jade
- Release: 18 March 1996 – 1 May 1998

Dark Tales
- Traditional Chinese: 聊齋
- Simplified Chinese: 聊斋
Transcriptions
Standard Mandarin
- Hanyu Pinyin: Liáo Zhāi
- Wade–Giles: Liao2 Chai1
Yue: Cantonese
- Yale Romanization: Liu4 Jaai1
- Jyutping: Liu4 Zaai1

Dark Tales is a series of Hong Kong television period supernatural dramas that originally aired on Jade from 18 March 1996 to 1 May 1998, consisting of two installments with 75 episodes. Based on Qing Dynasty writer Pu Songling's series of supernatural tales called Strange Tales from a Chinese Studio, Dark Tales is produced by TVB and stars a cast of mainly Hong Kong and Taiwanese actors.

== Dark Tales I ==
Dark Tales I (聊齋) originally aired on Jade every weekday evening from 18 March to 5 May 1996, and is produced by Lau Sze-yu and Chou Ling-kang, consisting of 35 episodes. It features six independent stories, adapted from the first ten books of Pu's novel.

=== Part I (Episodes 1–5) ===
Part I (流光情劫; lit. "Stealing Love Through Time") is adapted from the tale Mr. Lu's Daughter (魯公女).

- Jamie Weng as Chang Yu-dan (張於旦)
- Cynthia Khan as Lu Chin-tsai / Lu Han-chu (魯金采／盧含珠)
- Chao Chung as You Feng-wen (游鳳紋)
- Gary Chan as Crown Prince (鹿王三太子)
- Jessie Chan as Siao Chui (小翠)
- Hsieh Han as Master Hui-tong (慧通大師)
- Chen Hung-lieh as Uncle Shen (沈叔)
- Suen Kwai-hing as Tien Tor Chi
- Chan Chung-gin as Emperor Crown (鹿王)
- Suen Dalong as Young Chang Yu-dan (十八歲張於旦)
- Kwok Tak-shun as Governor (戶部)
- Lily Liu as Governor's wife (戶部夫人)
- Cho Chai as Lu An (盧安)
- Wong Te-fen as Hong Er (紅兒)
- Shi Yun as Magistrate (縣令)
- Howie Huang as General (少將軍)
- Yip Jan-wa as Ming (阿明)
- Yip Yung as Cheng (阿政)

=== Part II (Episodes 6–10) ===
Part II (俠女田郎; lit. Heroine Tian) is adapted from the tale Tian Chi-lang (田七郎).

- Cheung Siu-fai as Wu Cheng-hsiu (武承休)
- Chin Siu-ho as Tian Chi-lang (田七郎)
- Cynthia Khan as Liu Mu-lian (劉木蓮)
- Josephine Lam as Wu Cheng-hsiu's wife (武承休夫人)
- Chao Chung as Su Yue (素月)
- Michelle Fung as Cheng Chu (程菊)
- Wilson Tsui as Li Ying (李應)
- Joseph Lee as Lin Er (林二)
- Wong Siu-lung as Siao Wu (小五)
- Leung Yuk-gan as Su Su (蘇蘇)
- Sally Chen as Tian's Mother (田母)
- Chen Hung-lieh as Yan Tao-sheng (嚴道生)
- Derek Kok as Yan Hou (嚴候)
- Hui Man-chuen as Yan Yung (嚴用)
- Chan Wing-chun as Wei Ming (魏明)
- Jack Wong as the Emperor (皇帝)
- Ho Bik-kin as Manager Wang (王掌櫃)
- Sun Dalong as Chiang Chiu (蔣九)
- Shiu Cheuk-hiu as Bali (巴利)
- Yip Yung as Balu (巴魯)
- Tie Meng-qiu as Eunuch Yu

=== Part III (Episodes 11–15) ===
Part III (古劍幽靈; lit. "Ancient Ghost Sword") is adapted from the tale Chin Sheng-se (金生色).

- Jamie Weng as Chin Sheng-se (金生色)
- Chiang Shu-na as Siao Wen (小雯)
- Elizabeth Lee as Mu Yue-chin (木月琴)
- Derek Kok as Mu Ma-biao (木麻彪)
- Alice Fung So-bor as Mrs. Mu (木夫人)
- Tam Yat-ching as Mu Ying-hao (木英豪)
- Kwong Wing-fai as Mu Hsing (木興)
- Yip Yung as Mu Long (木隆)
- Joseph Lee as Tung Kwai (董貴)
- Cheng Zhuan as Tung Wu (董五)
- Hsieh Han as Tung Bi-cheng (董必成)
- Kwan Yi as Grandma Chin (金姥姥)
- Wilson Tsui as Chin Sheng-kwang (金生光)
- Lily Li as Mother Bo (鴇母)
- Chan Pui-shan as Tao Hung (桃紅)
- Ho Sam as Prostitute
- Chan Heung-ying as Prostitute
- Chan Wing-chun as Wang Hsiung (王雄)
- Brian Wong as Liu Shi-hu (劉仕虎)
- Tie Meng-chiu as Yu Chi-yung (俞繼榮)

=== Part IV (Episodes 16–20) ===
Part IV (狐仙報恩; lit. "Fox Spirit Repays Debt") is adapted from the tale Siao Chui (小翠).

- Gallen Lo as Wang Yuan-feng (王元豐)
- Grace Yu as Siao Chui (小翠)
- Howie Huang as Wang Kuo-ying (王國英)
- Chen Hung-lieh as Wang Tai-cheng (王太常)
- Sally Chen as Mrs. Wang (王夫人)
- Chau Ching as Wang Yu-chi (王玉芝)
- Lily Li as Yu (虞氏)
- Kwan Yi as Liu (劉媒婆)
- Kwong Ming-fai as Chi Er (喜兒)
- Gary Chan as the Emperor (皇帝)
- Lee Lung-kee as Mao Song-nian (毛松年)
- Kwan Ching as Yu Hsu (玉虛道長)
- Law Suet-ling as Pang Er (胖兒)
- Hui Man-chuen as Wang Fei (王非)
- Fung So-bor as Madam Wang Chao (王曹氏)
- Josephine Lam as Fifth Aunt (五姨太)
- Cheng Pak-lun as Yuan Chung (袁忠)
- Chan Wing-chun as Chi He (祈和)
- Wan Sheung-yin as Empress Dowager (太后)

=== Part V (Episodes 21–25) ===
Part V (翁婿鬥法; lit. "Fight of the In-Laws") is adapted from the tale Chang-ting (長亭).

- Howie Huang as Shi Da-bu / Fifth Brother (石大璞／五師兄)
- Grace Yu as Weng Chang-ting (翁長亭)
- Chen Hung-lieh as Old Weng (翁老兒)
- Lily Li as Mrs. Weng (翁妻)
- Lee Lung-kee as a Taoist abbot
- Yip Jan-wa as Big Brother (大師兄)
- Yip Yung as Second Brother (二師兄)
- Suen Dalong as Third Brother (三師兄)
- Brian Wong as Fourth Brother (四師兄)
- Cheng Zhuan as Sixth Brother (六師兄)
- Hsieh Han as Old Mr. Shi (石老爹)
- Kwan Yi as Old Mrs. Shi (石老娘)
- Wong Siu-lung as Shi Da-kwai (石大珪)
- Amy Fan as Shi Siao-ying (石小英)
- Wong Chun-kam as Kao Kwai-chi (高桂枝)
- Ling Lai-man as Mr. Kao (高員外)
- Lau Kwai-fong as Mrs. Kao (高夫人)
- Wa Chung-nam as Kao's housekeeper (高管家)
- Fung Hiu-man as Weng Hung-ting (翁紅亭)
- Chan Pui-shan as Siao Yan (小燕)
- Wilson Tsui as Hua Hua Tai Sui (花花太歲)

=== Part VI (Episodes 26–35) ===
Part VI (秋月還陽; lit. "Chiu-yue Returns from Death") is adapted from the tale Wu Chiu-yue (伍秋月).

- Gallen Lo as Wang Ting (王鼎)
- Grace Yu as Wu Chiu-yue (伍秋月)
- Chen Hung-lieh as Wang Nai (王鼐)
- Josephine Lam as Wang Nai's wife, Liu (柳氏)
- Dai Siu-man as Wang Cheng (王誠)
- Hui Man-chuen as Wang An (王安)
- Amy Fans as Yuan Yuan-yuan (袁圓圓)
- Wilson Tsui as Octopus (八爪魚)
- Joseph Lee as Magistrate Peng (彭縣令)
- Cheng Fan-sang as King Yan
- Lau Dan as Chiu-yue's father, Wu Yuan (伍員)
- Derek Kok as Big Head Ghost (大頭鬼)
- Brian Wong as Three-eyed Ghost (三眼鬼)
- Lily Li as Ten Face Nun (十面尼)

== Dark Tales II ==
Dark Tales II (聊齋貳) originally aired on Jade every weekday evening from 9 March to 1 May 1998, and is produced by Lau Sze-yu, consisting of 40 episodes. It features eight independent stories, adapted from the first fifteen books of Pu's novel.

=== Part I (Episodes 1–5) ===
Part I (陸判奇談; lit. "Interesting Tales of Judge Lu") is adapted from the tale Judge Lu (陸判).

- Evergreen Mak as Chu Er-dan (朱爾旦)
- Celine Ma as Madam Chiao (嬌娘)
- Angie Cheong as Chang Yun-luo (章雲蘿)
- Felix Lok as Judge Lu (陸判)
- Marco Lo as Li Chi-chiao (黎子喬)

=== Part II (Episodes 6–10) ===
Part II (綠野飛仙; lit. "Flying Immortal in the Wilderness") is adapted from the tale Ying (阿英).

- Jackie Lui as Kan Yu (甘鈺)
- Noel Leung as Ah Ying (亞英)
- May Kwong as Chin Chi-niao (秦吉鳥)
- Derek Kok as Lang Wen-hsien (郎文軒)
- Elvina Kong as Rouge (胭脂)
- Chen Xiaoyun as Lotus Fairy (蓮花仙子)
- Chan Chung-kin as Father Hao (郝老爹)
- Samuel Yau as Chao Da-shan (趙大山)
- Wilson Tsui as Prince Ying (鷹王)
- Kwan Ching as Mountain Spirit (山妖)
- Suen Kwai-hing as Senior (長老)
- Lily Li as Aunt Yeung (楊大媽)

=== Part III (Episodes 11–15) ===
Part III (鬼母痴兒; lit. "Ghostly Mother, Devoted Son") is adapted from the tale Siang-chun (湘裙).

- Derek Kok as Shi Yun-ting (石雲庭)
- Louisa So as Siang-chun (湘裙)
- Benny Chan as Shi Tian-sheng (石天生)
- Joyce Chan as Hsia Sue (夏雪)
- Chan Dik-hak as Shi Yun-hsien (石雲軒)
- So Yan-chi as Hsien's wife
- Chan On-ying as Mute Chuan (啞娟)

=== Part IV (Episodes 16–20) ===
Part IV (陰差陽錯; lit. "Accidental Mistake") is adapted from the tale Wang Lu-lang (王六郎).

- Evergreen Mak as Wang Lu-lang (王六郎)
- Rain Lau as Hsu Dan-feng (許丹鳳)
- Chan Wing-chun as Underworld guardian (鬼差)
- Felix Lok as Hsu Ban-hsian (許半仙)

=== Part V (Episodes 21–25) ===
Part V (花醉紅塵; lit. "World of Drunk Flowers") is adapted from the tale Madam Hsin Shi-si (辛十四娘).

- Patrick Tam as Feng Shao-you (馮少游)
- Noel Leung as Madam Hsin Shi-si (辛十四娘)
- Dickson Li as King Bee (蜂王)
- Melissa Ng as Flower Spirit (花妖)
- Chang Wing-Chun as Emperor's Bodyguard
- Lily Li as Fox Spirit granny (狐狸婆婆)

=== Part VI (Episodes 26–30) ===
Part VI (隔世追情; lit. "Chasing Love Across Time") is adapted from the tale Chin-se (錦瑟).

- Joey Leung as Yang Da-yung (楊大勇)
- Louisa So as Sue Chin-se (薛錦瑟)
- Dickson Li as Yi Dao Sheng (一道生)
- Gordon Liu as Kao Ni (高聻)
- Akina Hong as Siao Siang (小香)
- Wilson Tsui as Chuang Tie-niu (莊鐵牛)
- Chan On-ying as Chiao Lan (嬌蘭)
- Celine Ma as Toad Spirit (蛤蟆)
- Ng Man-sang as Gecko Spirit (壁虎)
- Andy Tai as Monk Huo-yun (火雲僧人)
- Helen Ma as Ms. Hsu (徐氏)
- Felix Lok as Sue Po-ling (薛柏齡)

=== Part VII (Episodes 31–35) ===
Part VII (魅影靈狐; lit. "Phantom Fox Spirit") is adapted from the tale Lian Siang (蓮香).

- Benny Chan as Sang Siao (桑曉)
- Rain Lau as Lian Siang (蓮香)
- Florence Kwok as Li Chiu-rong (李秋蓉)
- Joyce Chan as Miao Ah-hsiu (苗阿秀)

=== Part VIII (Episodes 36–40) ===
Part VIII (斬妖神劍; lit. "Demon Sword") is adapted from the tale Lady Hua (花姑子).

- Jackie Lui as An Chun-yang (安君陽)
- Angie Cheong as Lady Hua (花姑子)
- Cheng Pak-lun as the Thunder God (雷神)
- Lily Liu as Lady Hua's mother
- Florence Kwok as Po Ching-ching (白晶晶)
- Derek Kok as Chian Chi-liang (錢七兩)
- Lily Li as Fox Demon's mother (花姑子母)
