= The Wandering Swordsman =

1970 Hong Kong film by Chang Cheh

- DVD cover
- 遊俠兒
- Directed by: Chang Cheh
- Written by: Ni Kuang
- Produced by: Run Run Shaw
- Starring: David Chiang; Lily Li
- Cinematography: Hua Shan
- Edited by: Chiang Hsing-lung
- Music by: Wang Fu-ling
- Production company: Shaw Brothers Studio
- Distributed by: Shaw Brothers Studio
- Release date: 4 February 1970
- Running time: 103 minutes
- Country: Hong Kong
- Language: Mandarin

The Wandering Swordsman (遊俠兒) is a 1970 Hong Kong wuxia film directed by Chang Cheh and produced by the Shaw Brothers Studio, starring David Chiang and Lily Li.

== Synopsis ==
Youxia'er, a chivalrous swordsman, saves Jiang Ling, a damsel in distress, and learns that she is the sister of Jiang Wei, who runs a private security company. The Jiangs have been tasked with escorting a convoy of valuables. Later, Youxia'er meets a gang of bandits led by Kong Mu, who tricks him into joining them in robbing the convoy. After realising his folly, Youxia'er helps the Jiangs fight the bandits to recover the valuables, but dies of his wounds sustained during the fight.

== Cast ==
- David Chiang as Youxia'er
- Lily Li as Jiang Ling
- Cheng Lui as Jiang Wei
- Chang Pei-shan as Kong Wu
- Wang Kuang-yu as Jin Lilai
- Wu Ma as Hou Jiu
- Chan Sing as Zhong Chihu
- Lau Gong as Fang Tianlong
- Hung Lau as Guotianyun
- Bolo Yeung as Dujiaolong
- Tung Li as Chief Wang
- Nam Wai-lit as Chief Wen
- Tung Choi-bo as Chief Xie
- Cliff Lok, Wong Chung and Yuen Cheung-yan as escorts
