= Between Love & Desire =

Hong Kong television series

- Official poster
- Also known as: Perfect Traitor
- 完美叛侶]
- Genre: Modern, Romance, Legal
- Created by: Hong Kong Television Broadcasts Limited
- Written by: Lam Chung-bong
- Starring: Moses Chan; Maggie Shiu; Ben Wong; Rachel Kan; Roxanne Tong; Brian Chu
- Theme music composer: Damon Chui
- Opening theme: The Last Breakup (最後一次分手) by Jinny Ng
- Country of origin: Hong Kong
- Original language: Cantonese
- No. of episodes: 20

Production
- Executive producer: Catherine Tsang
- Producer: Au Yiu-hing
- Production location: Hong Kong
- Editor: Lam Chung-bong
- Camera setup: Multi camera
- Running time: 45 minutes
- Production company: TVB

Original release
- Network: Jade
- Release: 4 July – 29 July 2016

Between Love & Desire
- Traditional Chinese: 完美叛侶
- Simplified Chinese: 完美叛侣
- Cantonese Yale: Yùnméih Buhnléuih
- Literal meaning: "Perfect Companion"
Transcriptions
Standard Mandarin
- Hanyu Pinyin: Wánměi Pànlǚ
- Bopomofo: ㄨㄢˊㄇㄟˇ ㄆㄢˋㄌㄩˇ
Yue: Cantonese
- Yale Romanization: Yùnméih Buhnléuih
- Jyutping: Jyun4mei5 Bun6leoi5
- IPA: [jy̏ːn.me̬i̯ pùːn.lɵ̬y̯]

Between Love & Desire (Chinese: 完美叛侶; literally "Perfectly Betrayed Companion") is a 2016 Hong Kong television romance legal drama produced by Au Yiu-hing for TVB, starring Moses Chan, Maggie Shiu and Ben Wong as the main cast. It premiered on Hong Kong's TVB Jade and Malaysia's Astro On Demand on July 4, 2016, airing every Monday to Friday on Hong Kong's TVB Jade and Malaysia's Astro On Demand channels during its 8:30-9:30 pm timeslot, concluding July 29, 2016 with a total of 20 episodes.

The drama centers on the plot of how an unbalance work-personal life can change a person and break apart their family life.

== Synopsis ==
The once mild mannered Hugo Ngo Pak-yin (Moses Chan) is driven to become a lawyer who seeks justice and fairness after witnessing the injustice and prosecution of his father who was falsely framed for a crime he did not commit. However, his quest for perfection in his profession slowly turns him into a power hungry, cold, ruthless and inconsiderate of others, human being. Due to his workaholic behavior, he neglects his marriage and his long suffering wife Rebecca Tsang Bo-lam (Maggie Shiu) no longer sees him as the man she loved and married. When Rebecca reconnects with her childhood friend Patrick Lui Wing-hang (Ben Wong), she finds the courage to finally leave Hugo.

Patrick, who is also a lawyer, but unlike Hugo, is a kind and compassionate person who seeks no gain when he defends his clients. Now a widower, Patrick hopes his long-time friendship with Rebecca will turn romantic when she decides to leave Hugo, since he had always had romantic feelings for her. On the day Rebecca leaves Hugo she is coincidentally attacked, she suspects Hugo is behind this attack. Hugo realizes the wrong of his past and tries to salvage his marriage.

When Hugo's younger brother Fred is falsely accused of rape by a rich man's mistress to hide her infidelity with the man she truly loves. Hugo is reminded of his reasons of becoming a lawyer. Hugo's boss demands he drops his brother's case in order not to offend the rich man. Hugo however, further realizes that his career and power is nothing without loved ones in his life and defies his boss's demand. Hugo goes out of his way to seek justice for his brother and Rebecca soon recognizes Hugo re-becoming the man she once loved.

== Cast ==
=== Main cast ===
- Moses Chan as Hugo Ngo Pak-yin (敖柏言)

Rebecca Tsang's husband. Ngo Gwan's son and Fred Ngo's older brother. A powerful and ruthless attorney who starts to question his path in life when his wife decides to leave him because of his changing personality. He believes in order to have a perfect life he must succeed in his career. His wife Rebecca starts to despise the person he has become and decides to leave him.

- Maggie Shiu as Rebecca Tsang Bo-lam (曾寶琳)

Hugo Ngo's wife. Lau Man-giu's daughter. Patrick Lui's childhood friend. She married her husband before he became a lawyer, when he was a kind and understanding person but starts to despise him when his personality changes due to him being career minded. Seeing her husband is no longer the man she married and once loved, she finds the courage, with the help of Patrick, to leave Hugo.

- Ben Wong as Patrick Lui Wing-hang (呂永恆)

Wong Hiu-ting's widowed husband and Haley Wong's former brother in-law who still looks out for her. Rebecca Tsang's childhood friend who he grew up with in Indonesia and had always had feelings for. He is a lawyer who fights for justice instead of profits. When he sees Rebecca in an unhappy marriage he gives her strength to leave her husband.

=== Wong, Ngo & Cheng Law firm ===
- Joseph Yeung as Martin Wong Ming (黃銘)
- Rachel Kan as Rowena Cheng Yuen-ping (程婉萍)
- Ricky Lee as Tommy Leung Shu-fai (梁樹輝)
- English Tang as Peter Ng Fong-wing (吳方永)
- Leo Tsang as Kenny Lee Man-kee (李敏基)
- Patrick Dunn as Scott Siu Hon-wah (蕭漢華)
- Mandy Lam as Carmen Chow Yin-yuan (周燕媛)
- William Chu as Justin Ma Sai-ting (馬世霆)
- Joey Law as Damon Mak Dik-man (麥狄文)
- Candy Chang as Cindy Kwong Sin-yee (鄺倩儀)
- Cherry Cheung as Vivian Chan Ka-wai (陳嘉惠)
- Mikako Leung as Jenny
- GoGo Cheung as Cherry Luk Tse-ying (陸子盈)
- Deborah Poon as Judy
- Lucy Li as Karen

=== Ngo family ===
- Li Shing-cheong as Ngo Gwan (敖君)
- Kitty Lau as Ngo Guen (敖娟)
- Chan Wing-chun as Yip Siu-hong (葉兆康)
- Lily Li as Lau Man-giu (劉曼嬌)
- Brian Chu as Fred Ngo Bak-wang (敖柏泓)

=== Lui family ===
- Skye Chan as Wong Hiu-ting (王曉晴)
- Roxanne Tong as Haley Wong Hiu-yan (王曉欣)

== Development and production ==
- Between Love & Desire is producer Au Yiu-hing's first project with TVB.
- The costume fitting ceremony was held on September 7, 2015 12:30 pm at Tseung Kwan O TVB City Studio One.
- The blessing ceremony was held on October 27, 2015 3:00 pm at Tseung Kwan O TVB City Studio Thirteen.
- Filming took place from September till December 2015, entirely on location in Hong Kong.

== Viewership ratings ==
Timeslot (HKT)	#	Week	Episode(s)	Average points	Peaking points
Mon – Fri (8:30-9:30 pm); 20:30–21:30	1	01 – 08 Jul 2016	1 – 5	23	25
Mon – Fri (8:30-9:30 pm); 20:30–21:30	2	11 – 15 Jul 2016	6 – 10	23	25
Mon – Fri (8:30-9:30 pm); 20:30–21:30	3	18 – 22 Jul 2016	11 – 15	24	--
Mon – Fri (8:30-9:30 pm); 20:30–21:30	4	25 – 29 Jul 2016	16 – 20	23	27
Total average				23.25	27

== Awards and nominations ==
Year	Ceremony	Category	Nominee	Result
2016	StarHub TVB Awards	My Favourite TVB Male TV Character	Ben Wong	Nominated
2016	StarHub TVB Awards	My Favourite TVB Theme Song	"The Last Breakup" (最後一次分手) by Jinny Ng	Nominated
2016	TVB Star Awards Malaysia	My Favourite TVB Actress in a Leading Role	Maggie Shiu	Nominated
2016	TVB Star Awards Malaysia	My Favourite TVB Actress in a Leading Role	Maggie Shiu	Nominated
2016	TVB Star Awards Malaysia	My Favourite TVB Actress in a Leading Role	Ben Wong	Nominated
2016	TVB Anniversary Awards	Best Series	Between Love & Desire	Nominated
2016	TVB Anniversary Awards	Best Actor	Ben Wong	Nominated
2016	TVB Anniversary Awards	Best Supporting Actress	Roxanne Tong	Nominated
2016	TVB Anniversary Awards	Most Popular Series Song	"The Last Breakup" (最後一次分手) by Jinny Ng	Nominated
