= With or Without You (TV series) =

Hong Kong television series

- Official poster
- Also known as: Tung Po's Family Affairs
- 東坡家事
- Genre: Period drama, historical fiction, Comedy
- Created by: Hong Kong Television Broadcasts Limited
- Written by: Au Yin Yuan, Ngai Hong Yee
- Starring: Bobby Au-Yeung; Joey Meng; Vincent Wong; Jacqueline Wong; Alice Chan; Harriet Yeung
- Theme music composer: Jin Nakamura
- Opening theme: I Am Not Good Enough 我不夠好 by Linda Chung
- Country of origin: Hong Kong
- Original languages: Cantonese; Mandarin
- No. of episodes: 30

Production
- Executive producer: Catherine Tsang
- Producer: Wong Wai Sing
- Production locations: Hong Kong; China Central Television Wuxi Film & Television Base
- Editor: Ga Wai Nam
- Camera setup: Multi camera
- Running time: 45 minutes
- Production company: TVB

Original release
- Network: Jade; HD Jade
- Release: 26 October – 6 December 2015

With or Without You
- Traditional Chinese: 東坡家事
- Simplified Chinese: 东坡家事
- Literal meaning: "Tung Po's Family Affairs"
Transcriptions
Standard Mandarin
- Hanyu Pinyin: Dōng Pō Jiā Shì
Yue: Cantonese
- Yale Romanization: Dūng Bō Gā Sih
- Jyutping: Dung1 Bo1 Gaa1 Si6

With or Without You (Chinese: 東坡家事; Jyutping: Dung1 Bo1 Gaa1 Si6; Cantonese Yale: Dūng Bō Gā Sih; literally "Tung Po's Family Affairs") is a 2015 Hong Kong period historical fiction comedy-drama produced by TVB, starring Bobby Au-Yeung and Joey Meng as the main leads. Filming took place from October 2014 to February 2015 on location in Hong Kong and China Central Television Wuxi Film & Television Base. The drama is broadcast on Hong Kong's Jade and HD Jade channels from 26 October till 6 December 2015 every Monday through Friday during its 8:30–9:30 pm timeslot with a total of 30 episodes.

The drama is a fictional telling of Song dynasty poet Su Shi and is the last of TVB's four 2015 grand anniversary dramas to be broadcast.

== Synopsis ==
The drama tells the story of Su Shi (So Tung Po), a poet from the Song dynasty, and his complicated family life. After his first wife's death, he marries a talented chef, Wong Yun Chi, but they often argue, and his son doesn't accept his new stepmother. Tung Po also worries about his sisters' love lives, one being pursued by a flirtatious man who hides a secret, and the other marrying Tung Po's friend after a series of romantic mishaps. Su Shi, known as So Tung Po, struggles with family issues in this drama. His second marriage to chef Wong Yun Chi is rocky, and his son resists accepting her. His sisters face their own romantic challenges: one deals with a deceitful boyfriend, and the other marries Tung Po's friend after previous heartbreak. The family faces further turmoil when a plague hits, revealing secrets and testing their bonds. The show follows Su Shi (So Tung Po) second marriage, his son's rejection of his stepmother, and his sisters' problematic love lives.

== Cast ==
=== So family ===
- Bobby Au-Yeung as So Tung Po, a famous poet and officer in Song dynasty
- Joey Meng as Wong Yun Zhi, Tung po's younger cousin-sister-in-law and wife later.
- Jimmy Au as So Chit, Tung Po's younger brother, also a poet and officer.
- Harriet Yeung as So Tai Mui, one of the two Tung Po's younger sisters, So Siu Mui's elder sister. Chan Kwai Sheung's concubine.
- Jacqueline Wong as So Siu Mui, Tung Po's youngest sister, Chun Shiu Yau's wife and later the equivalent wife (a kind of old-fashioned marriage relationship in China), good in martial arts and couplets.
- Vincent Wong as Chun Shiu Yau, another famous poet in Song dynasty. Tung Po's younger brother-in-law, So Siu Mui's husband, not only good in literature, but also martial arts.
- Lam Wing Yu
- Wong Yee Kam

=== Chan family ===
- Tyson Chak as Chan Kwai Sheung, Tung Po's best friend, he is historically famous for his fear of his cruel wife. He's So Tai Mui's ex-lover. Tai Mui and Yin-hung's lover.
- Alice Chan as Lau Yuet O, Chan's wife, historically famous by her husband describing her as a lion from the east of Yellow River in Chinese idiom 河東獅吼

=== Song dynasty Royals and Officials ===
- Jonathan Cheung as Song Shenzong, the emperor.
- Mary Hon as the empress dowager
- Leanne Li as Shau-On State Princess, ex-master for Kwai Sheung's wife Lau Yuet O and Tung Po's wife Yun Zhi.
- Pal Sinn as Wong on Shek, a famous reformer and poet in the Song Dynasty.
- Kevin Yau
- Joan Lee

=== Extended cast ===
- Sire Ma as Kum Chow, a prostitute and spy from the Liao State
- Akina Hong as So Chit's wife, she is also the servant of Kum Chow
- Becky Lee as Shuk Mei, Mrs. What, Shiu Yau's ex-wife and later wife, a liar too
- Dickson Lee as Hung Sei, a captor and Shiu Yau's friend
- Joseph Yeung
- Chan Wing Chun
- Bob Cheung
- Joel Chan
- Ceci So as Shiu Yau's mother-in-law
- Wong Chun as Shiu Yau's father-in-law
- Albert Law as Ching Chi-Coi, Tung Po's ex-brother-in-law and Kum Chow's servant
- Lily Li
- Lydia Law
- Ally Tse
- Wong Hong Kiu
- Roxanne Tong as Yin-Hung, a prostitute in Luk Ming Yuen. Tung Po's friend, Chan Kwai-sheung's mistress
- Glen Lee as Wong Pong, the elder son of Wong On Shek
- Suki Lam
- Ivana Wong (王舒銳) as Wong Yun Zhi's servant

== Development ==
TVB 2015 calendar, September. Clockwise from top left to right: Joey Meng, Bobby-Au-Yeung, Alice Chan, Jacqueline Wong, Vincent Wong

- The costume fitting ceremony and blessing ceremony was held on 30 October 2014 at 12:30 pm Tseung Kwan O TVB City Studio One Common Room.
- Filming took place from October 2014 to February 2015 on location in Hong Kong and China Central Television Wuxi Film & Television Base.
- In March 2014, With or Without You was one of ten TVB dramas previewed at FILMART 2014.
- A promo image of With or Without You was featured in TVB's 2015 calendar for the month of September.

== Viewership ratings ==
Timeslot (HKT)	#	Week	Episode(s)	Average points	Peaking points
Mon – Fri (8:30-9:30 pm); 20:30–21:30	1	26 – 30 October 2015	1 – 5	24	26
Mon – Fri (8:30-9:30 pm); 20:30–21:30	2	02 – 6 November 2015	6 – 10	26	29
Mon – Fri (8:30-9:30 pm); 20:30–21:30	3	09 – 13 November 2015	11 – 15	25	28
Mon – Fri (8:30-9:30 pm); 20:30–21:30	4	16 – 20 Nov 2015	16 – 19	23	--
Mon – Fri (8:30-9:30 pm); 20:30–21:30	5	23 – 27 Nov 2015	20 – 24	25	--
Mon – Fri (8:30-9:30 pm); 20:30–21:30	6	30 Nov – 3 Dec 2015	25 – 29	25	--
Mon – Fri (8:30-9:30 pm); 20:30–21:30	6	(Sun) 6 Dec 2015	30	25	27
Total average				25	29

*19 November 2015: No episode was broadcast due to live airing of 2015 TVB Anniversary Gala.

== International broadcast ==
Network	Country	Airing Date	Timeslot
Astro On Demand	Malaysia	26 October 2015	Monday – Friday 8:30 – 9:15 pm
TVBJ	Australia	26 October 2015	Monday – Friday 7:15 – 8:15 pm
Starhub TV	Singapore	18 February 2016	Monday – Friday 8:00 – 9:00 pm

== Awards and nominations ==
Year	Ceremony	Category	Nominee	Result
2015	TVB Star Awards Malaysia	My Favourite TVB Drama Series	With Or Without You	Nominated
2015	TVB Star Awards Malaysia	My Favourite TVB Actor in a Leading Role	Bobby Au-Yeung	Nominated
2015	TVB Star Awards Malaysia	My Favourite TVB Actress in a Leading Role	Joey Meng	Nominated
2015	TVB Star Awards Malaysia	My Favourite TVB Actor in a Supporting Role	Vincent Wong	Nominated
2015	TVB Star Awards Malaysia	My Favourite TVB Actress in a Supporting Role	Jacqueline Wong	Nominated
2015	TVB Star Awards Malaysia	My Favourite TVB On-Screen Couple	Bobby Au-Yeung & Joey Meng	Nominated
2015	TVB Anniversary Awards	TVB Anniversary Award for Best Drama	With or Without You	Nominated
2015	TVB Anniversary Awards	TVB Anniversary Award for Best Actor	Bobby Au-Yeung	Nominated
2015	TVB Anniversary Awards	TVB Anniversary Award for Best Actress	Joey Meng	Nominated
2015	TVB Anniversary Awards	TVB Anniversary Award for Best Supporting Actor	Vincent Wong	Nominated
2015	TVB Anniversary Awards	TVB Anniversary Award for Best Supporting Actress	Jacqueline Wong	Nominated
2015	TVB Anniversary Awards	TVB Anniversary Award for Most Popular Male Character	Bobby Au-Yeung	Nominated
2015	TVB Anniversary Awards	TVB Anniversary Award for Most Popular Female Character	Joey Meng	Nominated
2015	TVB Anniversary Awards	TVB Anniversary Award for Most Popular Female Character	Jacqueline Wong	Nominated
2015	TVB Anniversary Awards	TVB Anniversary Award for Favourite Drama Song	I'm Not Good Enough (我不夠好) by Linda Chung	Nominated
