= List of TVB dramas in 2020 =

This is a list of television serial dramas released by TVB in 2020, including highest-rated television dramas and award ceremonies.

== Top ten drama series in ratings ==
The following is a list of TVB's top serial dramas in 2020 by viewership ratings. The recorded ratings include premiere week, final week, finale episode, and the average overall count of live Hong Kong viewers (in millions).

Highest-rated drama series of 2020
Rank	English title	Chinese title	Average	Peak	Premiere week	Final week	Series finale	HK viewers (millions)
1	Forensic Heroes 4	法證先鋒IV	36.3	36	27	31	36	1.90
2	Airport Strikers	機場特警	33.2	33	25	28	28	1.87
3	Al Cappuccino	反黑路人甲	28.6	31.8	24	27	27	1.87
4	Death By Zero	殺手	30.1	30.1	24	27	27	1.70
5	The Exorcist's 2nd Meter	降魔的2.0	29	29	28	26	26	1.70
6	The Dripping Sauce	大醬園	28	28	27	27	25	1.70
7	On-Lie Game	迷網	27.9	27.9	27	26	26	1.65
8	Life After Death	那些我愛過的人	27.4	27.4	25	25	24	1.60
9	Flying Tiger II	飛虎之雷霆極戰	27.4	27.4	25	24	24	1.60
10	Brutally Young	十八年後的終極告白	26.5	26.5	24	24	23	1.60

== Awards ==
Category/Organization	TVB Anniversary Awards 2020 10 Jan 2021
Best Drama	Al Cappuccino
Best TV short drama	Hong Kong Love Story
Best Actor	Vincent Wong; Legal Mavericks 2020
Best TV Male Character	Owen Cheung; Legal Mavericks 2020
Best Actor Malaysia	Vincent Wong; Legal Mavericks 2020
Best Actress Malaysia	Katy Kung; Hong Kong Love Story
Best TV Female Character	Katy Kung; Hong Kong Love Story
Best Drama Malaysia	Al Cappuccino
Best Actress	Sisley Choi; Legal Mavericks 2020
Best Supporting Actor	Jason Pai Piao; Hong Kong Love Story
Best Supporting Actress	Winki Lai; Al Cappuccino
Most Improved Actor	Brian Chu; Al Cappuccino
Best Host in variety	Pakho Chau & Benjamin Yuen
Most Improved Actress	Angel Chiang; Al Cappuccino
Best variety program	Miss Hong Kong 2020
Best Theme Song	Mortals don't know about love (凡人不懂愛) by Hubert Wu
Most Popular On-Screen Couple or Partnership	Vincent Wong, Brian Chu & Owen Cheung; Al Cappuccino

== First line-up ==
These dramas air in Hong Kong every Monday to Sunday from 8:00pm to 8:30pm on Jade.

Starting on 04 Jan 2020, these dramas air in Hong Kong every daily from 8:00pm to 8:30pm on Jade.

Broadcast	English title (Chinese title)	Eps.	Cast and crew	Theme song(s)	Avg. rating	Genre	Ref.
(from 2019); 20 Feb– 7 Aug 2026 (to 2021)	Come Home Love: Lo and Behold 愛·回家之開心速遞	2868	Sandy Shaw, Law Chun-ngok (producers); Ma Chun-ying, Lee Yi-wah, Yuen Bo-wai (writers); Lau Dan, Pal Sinn, Angela Tong, Koni Lui, Andrew Chan, Andrea So, Veronica Shiu, Joyce Tang, Kalok Chow, Law Lok-lam, Geoffrey Wong, Mark Ma, Ricco Ng, Hoffman Cheng, Mandy Lam, Kim Li	"Latin Soul Strut" "在心中" (Within the Heart) by Jacqueline Wong "開心速遞” (Happy courier) by 群星合唱	TBA	Sitcom, Supernatural	

== Second line-up ==
These dramas air in Hong Kong from 8:30pm to 9:30pm, Monday to Friday on Jade.

Remark: Starting on 14 Sept 2020 from 8:30 p.m to 10:30 p.m on Saturday, with two back-to-back episode until 06 Nov 2020 only on Jade.

Background shading indicates dramas not produced by TVB.

Broadcast	English title (Chinese title)	Eps.	Cast and crew	Theme song(s)	Avg. rating	Genre	Ref.
(from 2019); 18 Nov- 03 Jan	Legend of the Phoenix 凤弈	34	Fang Fang, Yu Haiyan (executive producer); Zhang Huabiao (writer); Wei Hantao (director); Viva He Hong Shan, Jeremy Tsui, Cao Xiwen, Wayne Lai	Be brave (逆光飛翔) by Hana Kuk	18	Historical period drama	
06 Jan- 14 Feb	Of Greed and Ants 黃金有罪	30	Amy Wong (producer); Lau Chi-Wah, Shing Mo-ching (writers); Eddie Cheung, Edwin Siu, Tony Hung, Ben Wong, Elaine Yiu, Matthew Ho, Jeannie Chan, Candy Cheung, Anthony Ho, Gilbert Lam	Chase for (快閃) by Fred Cheng Liar (你喜歡說謊) by Hana Kuk	25	Epic drama	
17 Feb- 27 Mar	Forensic Heroes 4 法證先鋒IV	30	Mui Siu Ching, Ben Fong (producers); Leong Man-wah, Yi Mui Fung, Sin Tsui-ching (writers); Raymond Wong Ho-yin, Selena Lee, Shaun Tam, Alice Chan, Rebecca Zhu, Roxanne Tong, Yumiko Cheng, Kelly Cheung, Sharon Chan, Fred Cheng, Jonathan Cheung, Gabriel Harrison, Susan Tse, Akina Hong, Patrick Tse, Michelle Yim, Nina Paw Hee Ching, Ling Ling Mak	Secrets and lies (圓謊) by Justin Lo No more tears (不要流淚) by Fred Cheng The second choice (我不是她) by Hana Kuk	36	Crime drama, Mystery	
30 Mar- 1 May	Airport Strikers 機場特警	25	Andy Chan (producer); Lam Lai-mei (writer); Owen Cheung, Mat Yeung, Sisley Choi, Roxanne Tong, Hugo Wong, Jack Hui, Eddie Kwan, Jonathan Wong, Carlo Ng, Brian Chu, Jackson Lai, Gloria Tang	Blood and tears (血淚的磨練) by Fred Cheng If you understand (如果你明白) by Hana Kuk	33	Crime drama, Police Tactical	
4 May- 05 Jun	The Exorcist's 2nd Meter 降魔的2.0	25	Dave Fong (producer); Ruby Law (writer); Kenneth Ma, Mandy Wong, Hubert Wu, Moon Lau, Susan Tse, Zoie Tam, C Kwan, Ram Chiang, Gloria Tang, Alex Mak Hoi Ching, Willie Wai, Iris Lam, Keith Ng, Kayee Tam	Crossroads (十字路口) & Mortals don't know about love (凡人不懂愛) by Hubert Wu I can't forget about you (我未能忘掉你) by Hana Kuk There is love (原來有愛) by Kayee Tam	29	Fantasy, Comedy, Horror	
08 Jun- 10 July	Life After Death 那些我愛過的人	25	Kwan Shu-ming (producer); Pang Mei-Fung (writer); Frankie Lam, Priscilla Wong, Shiga Lin, Mark Ma Kwun Tung, Stephen Wong Ka-lok, Yoyo Chen, Kyle Li, Zeno Koo, James Ng, Erin Wong, Chole So Ho-yee, Rainbow Yeung, Alice Fung So-bor, William Chak, Griselda Yeung	Little lies (小謊言) by Shiga Lin I don't want to lose (我輸不起) by Hana Kuk I don't miss you at all (沒有你並無掛念) by Jinny Ng Flying dreams (夢飛翔) by Brian Tse and Joey Thye	27.4	Romance, Drama	
13 July- 14 Aug	On-Lie Game 迷網	25	Simon Wong (producer); Shing Mo-ching (writer); Mat Yeung, Samantha Ko, Hera Chan, Brian Chu, John Chiang, Helen Ma, Li Shing-cheong, Stefan Wong, Strawberry Yeung Yuk Mui	Who are you (你是誰) by Fred Cheng	27.9	Suspense, Crime drama	
17 Aug- 11 Sept	Ratman To The Rescue 過街英雄	20	Ng Koon Yu (producer); Cheung Chung-sing (writer); Sammy Leung, Priscilla Wong, Kaman Kong, Zoie Tam, Angelina Lo, KK Cheung, Daniel Chau, Henry Lo, Henry Yu, Mark Ma Kwun Tung, Andrew Yuen Man-kit, Florence Kwok, Geoffrey Wong, Keith Ng, Kevin Tong, Amisha Ng	Accidental hero (小角色大英雄) by James Ng	23.9	Crime, Comedy	
14 Sept- 06 Nov	The Song of Glory 锦绣南歌	48	Wai Chu Lee, Huang Bin (directors); Wu Mengzhang (writers); Sweet Li, Qin Hao, Gu Jia Cheng, Guan Xueying, Long Zheng Xuan, Eddie Cheung, Yameng Zhang, Tan Jian Chang, Guangfu Li, Jianyi Li, Vivian Tian, Tu Li Man, Bella Du	Letting go (說過放下) by Hana Kuk	19.8	Historical period drama	
09 Nov- 27 Dec	Line Walker: Bull Fight 使徒行者3	37	So Man Chung (producer); Yip Tin Shing, Steffie Lai, Ruby Law Pui Ching (writers); Michael Miu, Raymond Lam, Kenneth Ma, Benjamin Yuen, Owen Cheung, Benz Hui, Elena Kong, Mandy Wong, Priscilla Wong, Sisley Choi, Shiga Lin, Serene Lim, Tony Hung, Kent Cheng, Joseph Zeng, Michael Tse, Ron Ng, Mat Yeung, Emily Kwan, Akina Hong, Mimi Kung, Joseph Lee, Otto Chan, Philip Keung, C.Kwan, Billy Yee, Geoffrey Albert Wong, Jazz Lam, Oscar Leung, Joman Chiang, Jason Piao, Brian Tse, Bowie Cheung, Harriet Yeung, Bob Lam	Oblivious (無人問我) by Raymond Lam Can't let you go (不能放手) by Hana Kuk	25.3	Crime drama, Thriller	
28 Dec- 04 Jan (to 2021)	The Impossible 3 非凡三俠	6	Virginia Lok (producer); Billy Tang (director); Thirteen Chan (producer); Julian Cheung, Bosco Wong, Chrissie Chau, Michael Wong, Moses Chan, Vincent Wong, Jacky Cai, Samantha Ko, Kiki Sheung, James Ng, Lawrence Cheng, Sammy Sum		24.1	Action, Comedy, Crime Thriller	

== Third line-up ==
These dramas air in Hong Kong from 9:30 pm to 10:30 pm, Monday to Friday on Jade.

Remark: Starting on 21 Mar 2020 from 8:30 p.m to 10:30 p.m on Saturday, with two back-to-back episode until 18 Apr 2020 only on Jade.

Background shading indicates dramas not produced by TVB.

Broadcast	English title (Chinese title)	Eps.	Cast and crew	Theme song(s)	Avg. rating	Genre	Ref.
(from 2019); 30 Dec - 17 Jan	Handmaidens United 丫鬟大聯盟	15	Au Yiu-Hing (producer); Lau Chi-Wah (writer); Tony Hung, Jacqueline Wong, Roxanne Tong, Brian Tse, Timothy Cheng, Pat Poon, Florence Kwok, Lisa Lau, Angie Cheong	Brave for you (想勇敢一次) by Kayee Tam	20	Historical Period Drama	
20 Jan- 28 Feb	The Dripping Sauce 大醬園	30	Leung Choi Yuen (producer); Tong Kin-ping (writer); Hugo Ng, Mimi Kung, Rebecca Zhu, Katy Kung, Matthew Ho, James Ng, Kaman Kong, Stephen Wong Ka-lok, Griselda Yeung, Andrew Yuen Man-kit, Akina Hong, Stephanie Che, Timothy Cheng, John Chan, Joseph Lee, Florence Kwok, Jonathan Lee, Tsui Wing, Maggie Yu, Kelly Fu, Jan Tse, Willie Wai, KK Cheung, Jerry Ku, Mat Yeung, Mabel Lau, Sophie Ngan	Timeless (真心不變) by Kayee Tam Time after time (似水流年) by Jinny Ng	28	Period drama	
02 Mar - 18 Apr	Joy Of Life 庆余年	45	Sun Hao (director); Wang Juan (writer); Zhang Jia (editor); Chen Yingjie (executive producer); Zhang Ruoyun, Sweet Li, Chen Daoming, Yuan Quan, Li Xiaoran, Cui Peng, Wu Gang, Liu Hua, Xiao Zhan, Cao Cuifen, Song Yi, Tong Mengshi, Li Chun, Xin Zhilei, Yu Rongguang, Wang Yang	The coldest day (最冷的一天) by Brian Tse	25	Historical period drama	
20 Apr- 15 May	Brutally Young 十八年後的終極告白	20	Simon Wong (producer); Liu Sau Lin (writer); Shaun Tam, Joel Chan, Mandy Wong, Vivien Yeo, Anthony Ho, Dominic Lam, Elvina Kong, Candice Chiu, Griselda Yeung, Mary Hon, Stephen Ho, Auston Lam, Ken Law, Frankie Choi, Milkson Fong, Geoffrey Wong, Gordon Siu	Confession (告白) by Fred Cheng I need you every minute (分分鐘需要你) by Joey Thye	26.5	Mystery, Thriller, Paranormal, Crime drama	
18 May- 26 Jun	Flying Tiger II 飛虎之雷霆極戰	30	Virginia Lok, Cha Chuen Yee (producers); Michael Miu, Bosco Wong, Ron Ng, Kenneth Ma, Oscar Leung, Joel Chan, Lawrence Ng, Michael Wong, Yoyo Mung, Kelly Cheung, Rebecca Chan, John Chiang, Jennifer Yu, Jacky Cai, Christine Kuo, Moon Lau, Zoie Tam, James Ng, Dominic Lam, Pat Poon, Timothy Cheng, Lee Grinner Pace, Liza Wang, Corinna Chamberlain, Strawberry Yeung Yuk Mui, Lily Li, Jack Wu, Sam Tsang, Dominic Ho, Telford Wong, Evergreen Mak, Steven Cheung Chi-hang, Parkman Wong, Ricky Wong	Breathing is hazardous (呼吸有害) by Karen Mok Reunion（不朽版）by Raymond Lam, MC Jin	27.4	Crime drama, Police Tactical	
29 Jun- 07 Aug	Death By Zero 殺手	30	Joe Chan (producer); Sin Siu-ling, Choi Ting-ting (writers); Wayne Lai, Ali Lee, Moses Chan, Katy Kung, Elena Kong, Kaman Kong, Samantha Ko, Louisa Mak, Brian Tse, Timothy Cheng, Anthony Ho, James Ng, Jimmy Au, Helen Ma, Kayee Tam, Amy Fan, Law Lan, Chun Wong, Li Shing-cheong, Lam Lei, Ka Sang Cheung	Unselfish (無私者) by James Ng The longest distance (最遠的距離) by Jinny Ng	30.1	Comedy, Thriller, Action	
10 Aug- 18 Sept	Al Cappuccino 反黑路人甲	30	Lam Chi-wah (producer); Wong Wai-keung (writer); Vincent Wong, Owen Cheung, Crystal Fung, Kathy Yuen, Samantha Ko, Angel Chiang, John Chiang, Winki Lai, Kelly Fu, Tsui Wing, Shek Sau, Jack Hui, Serene Lim, Brian Chu, Bert Mok, Li Shing-cheong, KK Cheung, Chun Wong, Henry Yu, King Kong Lam, Eddie Pang, Yu Chi Ming, Otto Chan, John Au Hin Wai, Albert Cheung	It's not real (似真如假) & Becoming you (甘心替代你) by Vincent Wong Opponent (對手戲) by Stephanie Ho	31.8	Trendy, Action, Comedy, Crime drama	
21 Sept- 16 Oct	Go! Go! Go! Operation C9; C9特工	20	Liang Yao-jiang (producer); Ng Lap-kwong, Choi Shuk-yin (writers); Samantha Ko, Kenneth Ma, Lai Lok-yi, Steve Lee, Brian Chu, Kiwi Yuen, Griselda Yeung, Jessica Kan, Becky Lee, Eyvonne Lam, Geoffrey Wong, Oscar Li	Learning to love (怎麼去愛) by Kayee Tam	20.8	Action, Thriller	
19 Oct- 13 Nov	The Witness 木棘証人	20	Liang Yao-jiang (producer); Cheung Sai-cheong (writer); Him Law, Kelly Cheung, Willie Wai, Pinky Cheung, Tsui Wing, Sammi Cheung Sau Man, Lau Kong, Geoffrey Albert Wong, Louis Szeto, Milkson Fong	The mystery (謎團) by Fred Cheng	23.9	Crime drama, Comedy	
16 Nov- 24 Dec	Legal Mavericks 2020 踩過界II	28	Lam Chi-wah (producer); Wong Wai Keung, Fung Yat Chun, Yeuk-Si Chung (writers); Vincent Wong, Sisley Choi, Owen Cheung, Kelly Cheung, Lesley Chiang, Jessica Kan, Gloria Tang, Angel Chiang, Paul Chun, Hugo Wong, King Ching Lam, Chun Wong, Amisha Ng, Alice Tung, KK Cheung, Pat Poon, Sam Tsang, Bowie Wu, Jason Piao Pai, Carisa Yan, Toby Chan, Tracy Chu, Zoie Tam, Snow Suen, Ashley Chu, Tiffany Lau, Bob Cheung, Brian Chu, Penny Chan, Karl Ting, KK Cheung, Tsui Wing, Albert Cheung, Suet Nay, Griselda Yeung, Law Lan, Li Shing-cheong, Candice Chiu, Wylie Chiu, Stefan Wong, Geoffrey Albert Wong	Insight (心眼) by Vincent Wong True of false (世事何曾是絕對) by Kayee Tam	22.8	Legal drama	
28 Dec- 24 Jan (to 2021)	The Offliners 堅離地愛堅離地	20	Ng Koon Yu (producer); Pang Mei-Fung (writer); Owen Cheung, Katy Kung, Moon Lau, Jason Chan Chi-san, Jacqueline Wong, Brian Tse, Karl Ting, Bowie Wu, Joseph Lee, Akina Hong, Rosanne Lui, Anthony Ho, Milkson Fong, Suet Nay	Almost (差一些) by Owen Cheung	21.3	Romantic, Drama, Comedy	

== Fourth line-up ==
These dramas air in Hong Kong from 10:30pm to 11:25pm, Monday to Friday on Jade.

Broadcast	English title (Chinese title)	Eps.	Cast and crew	Theme song(s)	Avg. rating	Genre	Ref.
7 Dec- 22 Dec	Hong Kong Love Stories 香港愛情故事	12	Lincoln Lam Hang (producer); Ho Ching Yi (writer); Katy Kung, Joey Law, Venus Wong, Mimi Kung, Jason Piao Pai, Bill Chan, Shek Sau, Brian Tse, Janis Chan, Niklas Lam, Kayan Yau, Frederick Chui	The Things We Do for Love (愛情事) by Shiga Lin Crying (哭牆) by Vivian Koo Against The Current (逆流直上) by Brian Tse and Joey Thye	21.7	Romance, Family Drama	

== Notes ==
- Ratman To The Rescue 過街英雄; Released overseas on December 16, 2019. Copyright notice: 2019.
- The Offliners 堅離地愛堅離地; Released overseas on November 18, 2019. Copyright notice: 2019.
