= List of TVB dramas in 2021 =

This is a list of television serial dramas released by TVB in 2021, including highest-rated television dramas and award ceremonies.

== Top ten drama series in ratings ==
The following is a list of TVB's top serial dramas in 2021 by viewership ratings. The recorded ratings include premiere week, final week, finale episode, and the average overall count of live Hong Kong viewers (in millions).

Highest-rated drama series of 2021
Rank	English title	Chinese title	Average	Peak	Premiere week	Final week	Series finale	HK viewers (millions)
1	Sinister Beings	逆天奇案	27		26.4			
2	The Impossible 3	非凡三俠	24.1					
3	Beauty and the Boss	愛美麗狂想曲	23.8					
4	Shadow of Justice	伙記辦大事	23.8					
5	The Forgotten Day	失憶24小時	23.1					
6	Armed Reaction 2021	陀槍師姐2021	22.8					
7	Plan B	寶寶大過天	22.6					
8	The Legend of Xiao Chuo	燕云台	22.1					
9	Kids' Lives Matter	星空下的仁醫	22.0		18.5	19.9	22	
10	Battle of the Seven Sisters	七公主	21.02					

== Awards ==
Category/Organization	TVB Anniversary Awards 2021 02 Jan 2022
Best Drama	Battle of the Seven Sisters
Best Actor	Shaun Tam; Take Two
Best Actor (Malaysia)	Shaun Tam; Take Two
Best Drama (Malaysia)	Kids' Lives Matter
Best Actress	Rosina Lam; Battle of the Seven Sisters
Best Actress Malaysia	Linda Chung; Kids' Lives Matter
Best Supporting Actor	Brian Chu; Take Two
Best Supporting Actress	Yoyo Chen; Plan B'
Most Improved Actors	Karl Ting and Joey Law
Most Improved Actress	Lesley Chiang
Best Theme Song	"Stars Academy" (Stars Academy theme song)
Most Popular On-Screen Couple or Partnership	Mandy Lam & Jack Hui; Come Home Love: Lo and Behold
Best Male Host	Johnson Lee; Family Feud
Best Male TV character	Kenneth Ma; Kids' Lives Matter
Best Female TV character	Ali Lee; Beauty and the Boss

== First line-up ==
These dramas air in Hong Kong every Monday to Sunday from 8:00 pm to 8:30 pm on Jade.

Remark: Starting on 24 July 2021 until 7 Aug 2021 from 7:30 pm to 8:00 pm due to 2020 Tokyo Olympic Games.

Broadcast	English title (Chinese title)	Eps.	Cast and crew	Theme song(s)	Avg. rating	Genre	Ref.
(from 2020); 20 Feb 2017– 7 Aug 2026 (to 2022)	Come Home Love: Lo and Behold 愛·回家之開心速遞	2868	Sandy Shaw, Law Chun-ngok (producers); Ma Chun-ying, Lee Yi-wah, Yuen Bo-wai (writers); Lau Dan, Pal Sinn, Angela Tong, Koni Lui, Andrew Chan, Andrea So, Veronica Shiu, Joyce Tang, Kalok Chow, Law Lok-lam, Geoffrey Wong, Mark Ma, Ricco Ng, Hoffman Cheng, Mandy Lam, Kim Li	"Latin Soul Strut" "在心中" (Within the Heart) by Jacqueline Wong "開心速遞” (Happy courier) by 群星合唱 "愛心灌溉" (Filled with love) by Joey Wong (JW)	TBA	Sitcom, Supernatural	

== Second line-up ==
These dramas air in Hong Kong from 8:30 pm to 9:30 pm, Monday to Friday on Jade.

Remark: Starting on 4 Jan 2021 from 8:30 p.m to 10:30 p.m on Saturday, with two back-to-back episode until 13 Feb 2021 only on Jade. Starting on 19 July 2021 there will not be premiering on the drama series due to the premiere of 2020 Tokyo Olympic Games which on 23 July 2021 to 08 Aug 2021.

Background shading indicates dramas not produced by TVB.

Broadcast	English title (Chinese title)	Eps.	Cast and crew	Theme song(s)	Avg. rating	Genre	Ref.
(from 2020); 28 Dec- 02 Jan	The Impossible 3 非凡三俠	6	Virginia Lok (producer); Billy Tang (director); Thirteen Chan (producer); Julian Cheung, Bosco Wong, Chrissie Chau, Michael Wong, Moses Chan, Vincent Wong, Jacky Cai, Samantha Ko, Kiki Sheung, James Ng, Lawrence Cheng, Sammy Sum		24.1	Action, Comedy, Crime Thriller	
04 Jan- 13 Feb	The Legend of Xiao Chuo 燕云台	39	Jeffery Chiang (director); Tiffany Tang, Charmaine Sheh, Amber Lushan, Shawn Dou, Jing Chao, Tan Kai, Liu Yi-jun, Ji Chen, Ning Li	By my side (誰人在身邊) by Joey Wong	22.1	Historical period drama, Costume, Wuxia	
15 Feb- 20 Mar	The Forgotten Day 失憶24小時	27	Amy Wong (producer); Sin Chui Ching (producer); Roger Kwok, Shaun Tam, John Chiang, Grace Wong, Roxanne Tong, Zoie Tam, Elvina Kong, Anthony Ho, Max Cheung, Pal Sinn, Gary Tam, Lisa Lau, Bowie Wu, Carlo Ng, Oscar Li, Eddie Pang, Derek Wong, Amisha Ng, Amy Fan	Best friend (摯友) by Deep Ng	23.1	Horror, Comedy, Mystery	
22 Mar- 30 Apr	Beauty And The Boss 愛美麗狂想曲	30	Marco Law (producer); Kwan Chung-ling, Wong Bing-yee (writers); Moses Chan, Edwin Siu, Ali Lee, Jeannie Chan, Zoie Tam, Harriet Yeung, Raymond Cho, Eileen Yeow, Claire Yiu, Iris Lam, Sammi Cheung, Ashley Chu, Jackson Lai, Anthony Ho, Matthew Ho, William Hu, Hugo Wong	Love is beautiful (愛很美麗) by Hana Kuk; Falling In Love by Kayee Tam	23.8	Romance, Comedy, Drama	
3 May- 11 Jun	Sinister Beings 逆天奇案	30	Lau Kar Ho, Chan Chi-jing (producers); Sham Kwok-wing, Sun Hao Hao (writers); Ruco Chan, Rosina Lam, Crystal Fung, Ben Wong, Joman Chiang, Moon Lau, Jonathan Cheung, Mat Yeung, Joseph Lee, Li Shing-cheong, Jerry Ku, Gabriel Harrison, Pat Poon, Lai Yin Shan, Winona Yeung, Suey Kwok, Bob Cheung, Karl Ting, Arnold Kwok, Akina Hong, Li Lung Kay, Peter Pang	Adversity (逆襲) by Hubert Wu; Secret Garden (秘密花園) by Hana Kuk	27	Crime drama, Mystery, Action, Thriller	
14 Jun- 16 July	Plan B' 寶寶大過天	25	Liu Chun Shek (producer); Wong Bing-yee (writer); Wong Bing-yi (screenwriter); Chan Yu-ling (choreographer); Kenneth Ma, Eliza Sam, Hugo Ng, Kiki Sheung, Mimi Kung, Joseph Lee, Jonathan Cheung, James Ng, Yoyo Chen, Stephanie Che, Candy Cheung, David Do	My angel (天使) by Kayee Tam	22.6	Family drama	
09 Aug- 11 Sept	Battle of the Seven Sisters 七公主	26	Joe Chan (producer); Shing Mo-ching (writer); Guoqiang Zhong (choreographer); Priscilla Wong, Rosina Lam, Samantha Ko, Kaman Kong, Judy Kwong, Hera Chan, Katy Kung, Moon Lau, Jeannie Chan, Helen Ma, Ben Wong, Timothy Cheng, 6 Wing, Tsui Wing, Gilbert Lam, Telford Wong, Brian Tse, Karl Ting, To Yin Gor, Lau Dan, Kayee Tam, Candice Chiu, Aurora Li, Becky Lee, King Lam, Sunny Dia, Joel Chan	You Me Her (你我她) by Kayee Tam, How To Give Up On Love (該如何放棄愛) by Vivian Koo	21.02	Romantic drama, Fashion comedy	
13 Sept- 15 Oct	The Kwoks And What 我家無難事	25	Amy Wong (producer); Lam Lai-mei (writer); Tan Tri-san (screenwriter); Calvin Leung (director); Paw Hee-ching, Joe Ma, Mat Yeung, Stephanie Che, Natalie Tong, Grace Wong, Eddie Kwan, Wu Fei, Tsui Wing, Stephen Wong Ka-lok, Lisa Lau, Griselda Yeung, Jessica Kan, Kelly Fu, Kaman Kong, Alice Fung So-bor, Gary Tam, Stephen Ho, Helen Ma	From the Beginning (從頭開始) by Joey Law, The Outside World (門外的世界) by Fred Cheng	20.08	Family drama, Comedy, Fashion	
18 Oct- 20 Nov	Take Two 換命真相	25	Wong Wai Sing (producer); Ma Junhui (writer); Shaun Tam, Gloria Tang, Jonathan Cheung, Brian Chu, Angel Chiang, Moon Lau, Toby Chan, Iris Lam, Griselda Yeung, Amy Fan, Timothy Cheng, Gilbert Lam, Mary Hon, Martin Tong, Alice Wong	Forever apart (殊途永遠) by Fred Cheng Just because I love you (只因深愛妳) by Shaun Tam Surrender (投降吧) by Jaryd Tam (originally sung by Fred Cheng)	19.6	Thriller, Mystery, Time travel	
22 Nov- 17 Dec	A Love Of No Words 十月初五的月光	20	Chan Chi-Kong (producer); Siu Ling Sin (writer); Cheung Bak Yan (screenwriter); Shek Sau, Michelle Yim, Hubert Wu, Regina Ho, Joey Law, Claire Yiu, Vincent Lam, Gabriel Harrison, Akina Hong, Rainky Wai, Arnold Kwok, Alvin Ng, Bella Lam, Judy Kwong, Strawberry Yeung, Geoffrey Wong, Li Lung Kay, Ricky Wong, Dickson Yu, Kitty Lau	Good luck to Jun (祝君好) by Hubert Wu Lotus fragrance (荷花香) by Michelle Yim	19.8	Fashion, Romance, Drama	
20 Dec- 14 Jan (to 2022)	Used Good 異搜店	20	Liang Yao-Jiang (producer); Cheung Shi-Cheong (writer); Matthew Ho, James Ng, Hera Chan, Eyvonne Lam, Raymond Cho, Shing Mak, Li Shing-cheong, Strawberry Yeung, Lai Yin Shan, Eric Cheng, John Chan, Amy Fan, Aurora Li	How time flies (光陰飛逝時) by Jinny Ng	22.3	Mystery, Paranormal, Thriller	

== Third line-up ==
These dramas air in Hong Kong from 9:30 pm to 10:30 pm, Monday to Friday on Jade.

Remark: Starting on 19 July 2021 to 22 July 2021 from 10:00 pm to 11:00 pm then starting on 23 July 2021 to 06 Aug 2021 from 10:15 pm to 11:15 pm extra hours of the episode due to 2020 Tokyo Olympic Games.

Broadcast	English title (Chinese title)	Eps.	Cast and crew	Theme song(s)	Avg. rating	Genre	Ref.
(from 2020); 28 Dec- 24 Jan	The Offliners 堅離地愛堅離地	20	Ng Koon Yu (producer); Pang Mei-Fung (writer); Owen Cheung, Katy Kung, Moon Lau, Jason Chan Chi-san, Jacqueline Wong, Brian Tse, Karl Ting, Bowie Wu, Joseph Lee, Akina Hong, Rosanne Lui, Anthony Ho, Milkson Fong, Suet Nay	Almost (差一些) by Owen Cheung	21.3	Romantic, Drama, Comedy	
25 Jan- 05 Mar	Armed Reaction 2021 陀槍師姐2021	30	Dave Fong (producer); Sin Siu-ling, Choi Ting-ting (writers); Jessica Hsuan, Moses Chan, Joyce Tang, Hui Shiu-hung, Tony Hung, Fred Cheng, Him Law, Gloria Tang, Moon Lau, Candice Chiu, Mimi Choo, Belle Lam, Willie Wai, Raymond Chiu, Derek Wong, Bob Cheung, C Kwan, Gabriel Harrison, Li Shing-cheong, Leo Kwan, Mayanne Mak, Kandy Wong, Kelly Cheung, Kenneth Ma, Hubert Wu, Kayi Cheung, Junior Anderson, Toby Chan, Willie Wai, Pat Poon, Angelina Lo, Susan Tse, Kaman Kong, Matthew Ho, Jan Tse, Arnold Kwok, Matthew Chu, Carlos Koo, Leo Tsang, Ben Li, Onitsuka Ng, To Yin Gor, Alice Fung, Maggie Wong, Law Lan, June Ng, Jumbo Tsang, Rachel Lui, Mandy Ho, Adrien Yau	I Don't Want To Leave (我不想別離) by Joey Wong Love and Hate (敢愛敢恨) by Joey Thye The Habit (習慣) [in Mandarin] by Vivian Koo	22.8	Crime drama, Mystery, Comedy	
08 Mar- 09 Apr	The Runner 大步走	25	Wong Wai Sing (producer); Lo Mei-wan, Tong Kin-ping (writers); Joel Chan, Elaine Yiu, Tiffany Lau, Max Cheung, Joey Law, Yoyo Chen, Jack Wu, Ram Chiang, Tyson Chak, Candice Chiu, Connie Man, Jazz Lam, KK Cheung, Jimmy Au, Wong Yee Kam, Chris Leung, Carisa Yan, Helen Ma, Heidi Chu, Suet Nay, Gary Tam, Tony Chui, Sam Tsang, Sophia Lam, Aurora Li, Sandy Leung, Janice Shum	Against the wind (逆著風) by Fred Cheng	19.3	Sports, Romance, Drama	
12 Apr- 23 May	Shadow of Justice 伙記辦大事	32	Andy Chan (producer); Sandy Shaw (writer); Tan Chui Shan (screenwriter); Bobby Au-Yeung, Joe Ma, Joey Meng, Jeannie Chan, Winki Lai, Kelly Cheung, Mat Yeung, Pierre Ngo, Griselda Yeung, John Au, KK Cheung, Celine Ma, Jimmy Au, Stephen Ho, Ball Mang, Bobo Yeung, Martin Tong, Kris Lam, Geoffrey Wong, Leo Kwan, Kelvin Lee, Willie Lau, Oman Lam, Timothy Cheng, Otto Chan, Janice Shum, Frankie Choi, Julian Yik Yu Hong, Gregory Lee, Parkman Raphael Wong, Fanny Ip, Russell Cheung, Carat Cheung, Jackson Lai, Steve Lee	Right or wrong (對與錯) by Fred Cheng Wrong day (錯的一天) by Jinny Ng	23.8	Crime drama, Legal	
24 May- 18 Jun	Final Destiny 一笑渡凡間	20	Simon Wong (producer); Siu Chi Lam (writer); Calvin Leung (choreographer); Edwin Siu, Roxanne Tong, Sammy Sum, Jessica Kan, Rebecca Chan, Elvina Kong, Candy Cheung, Chloe Nguyen, Max Cheung, Henry Yu, Anthony Ho, Angel Chiang, Jacqueline Ch'ng, To Yin Gor, David Do, Stephen Ho, Frankie Choi, Nicole Wan, Moss Wu, Gary Tam, Leo Tsang, Lawrence Lau, Keith Mok, Joan Lee, Mina Kwok, Burmie Wong, Athena Ng, Alex Yung	We'll be together (喜愛便一起) by Kayee Tam	18.9	Historical period drama, Comedy, Mystery	
21 Jun- 27 Jun	Fraudstars 欺詐劇團	7	Poon Ka Tak (producer); Lu Gu, Fu Yu Cheng (writer); Lawrence Cheng, Pierre Ngo, Vincent Lam Wai, Angel Chiang, Sammi Cheung Sau Man, Kirby Lam, Max Cheung, Fred Cheng, Enson Lau, Joey Wong, Alex Lam, Carlo Ng, Alex Tse, Yen To, Rosanne Lui, Pat Poon, Griselda Yeung, Dickson Yu, Penny Chan, Bert Mok, Amy Fan, Amisha Ng, Snow Suen, Anthony Ho, Law Suet	Action（純音樂）& Red Carpet（純音樂）Theme Music by Alex Lau	15.4	Comedy, Romantic drama	
28 Jun- 02 Aug	Murder Diary 刑偵日記	25	Kwan Shu-ming (producer); Chu King-kei, Lau Siu-kwan (writers); Wong Kwok Fai (screenwriter); Kara Wai, Vincent Wong, Philip Keung, Lai Lok-yi, Benjamin Yuen, Alice Chan, Mandy Wong, Venus Wong, Kelly Fu, Shiga Lin, Hana Kuk, Joey Thye, Max Cheung, Adrien Lau, Moss Wu, Kayan Yau, Maggie Yu, Candice Chiu, Mary Hon, Stephen Wong Ka Lok, Brian Tse, Hoi Yeung, Stephen Ho, Willie Wai, Otto Chan, Mark Ma Kwun Tung, Ken Law, Niklas Lam, Carlos Koo, Hoi Bok Yeung, Rachel Wong, Sandy Leung, Lena Wong, Wong Fei, Cindy Lee, Leslie Choi, Terence Tung	Skylight (天窗) by Vincent Wong Trust Nobody (不相信別人) by Hana Kuk Cared Too Much (太在意) by Shiga Lin Butterfly Effect (蝴蝶效應) by Hana Kuk and Vincent Wong	13.7	Crime Thriller, Mystery, Urban Legend, Paranormal	
03 Aug- 11 Sept	AI Romantic 智能愛人	30	Chan Kiu Ying, Liang Chongxun (producers); Tang Yaoliang, Deng Lijun, Pan Wei (screenwriters); Luo Junwei, Cheng Jiajie (choreographers); Ali Lee, Crystal Fung, 6 Wing, C.Kwan, Tyson Chak, Jessica Kan, Mayanne Mak, Angelina Lo, Ram Chiang, Kelvin Kwan, Elvina Kong, Joe Junior, Brian Tse, Henry Lo, Fred Cheung, Chun Wai, Ken Law, KK Cheung, Janice Shum, Carlos Koo, Matt Chow, Suki Lee, Andy Wong, Julian Yik Yu Hong	Never Happening (不可能發生) by Kayee Tam	17.4	Sci-fi, Comedy, Fashion Love Drama	
13 Sept- 16 Oct	The Line Watchers 把關者們	27	Kwan Shu-ming (producer); Kwan Man Sum (chief director); Leong Man-wah, Yi Mui Fung (writers); Benjamin Yuen, Mandy Wong, Carlos Chan, Venus Wong, Moon Lau, Yoyo Chen, Tiffany Lau, Karl Ting, Mark Ma Kwun Tung, Joey Law, Danny Hung, Telford Wong, Derek Wong, Hoi Yeung, Gabriel Harrison, Jarryd Tam, Alvin Ng, Mary Hon, Elvina Kong, Candy Cheung, Sophia Yip, Jack Wu, Stefan Wong, Raphael Wong, Keith Ng, Penny Chan, Arnold Kwok, Frankie Choi, Patrick Lam, Terrence Huang, Mina Kwok, June Ng, Rachel Ching, C.Kwan, Justin Wong, Bryan Pun, King Lam, Vincent Lam Wai, Dickson Yu, Andrew Yuen Man-kit, Man Yeung, Albert Au	Gatekeeper (過關) by Pakho Chau, Knowing (明知故犯) by Hubert Wu	18.31	Crime drama, Police Tactical	
18 Oct- 22 Nov	Kids' Lives Matter 星空下的仁醫	25	Ben Fong (producer); Pun Man Hung, Sun Hao Hao (writers); Kevin Cheng, Kenneth Ma, Him Law, Linda Chung, Catherine Chau, Bowie Cheung, Florence Kwok, Regina Ho, Mimi Kung, Yoyo Chen, Heidi Chu, Jan Tse, Linna Huynh, Fanny Ip, Sam Tsang, Gabriel Harrison, Niklas Lam, Arnold Kwok, Kelvin Kwan, Willie Wai, Maggie Yu, Akina Hong, Sammi Cheung Sau-man, Wiyona Yeung, Lesley Chiang, To Yin Gor, Fanny Lee, Andy Lin, Debbie Lo, Sandy Leung, Baby Bo, Judy Tsang, Joyce Ngai, Mary Hon, Li Lung Kay, Singh Hartihan Bitto, Bert Mok, Venus Tang, Lena Wong, Tania Chan	Cherish (好好珍惜自己) by Linda Chung Fear in my heart (我會害怕) by Hana Kuk Couldn't tell (不敢開口) by Vivian Koo	22	Medical drama	
23 Nov- 25 Dec	The Ringmaster 拳王	25	Andy Chan (producer); Sin Chui Ching (writers); Zhong Rushi, Cheung Wai-Le (screenwriters); Wayne Lai, Owen Cheung, Shaun Tam, Brian Chu, Jack Hui, Hugo Wong, Timothy Cheng, Lau Dan, Law Lan, Elaine Yiu, Winki Lai, Jacky Cai, Amber Tang, Jimmy Au, Leo Kwan, Leo Tsang, Kinlas Chan, William Chak, Joan Lee, Aurora Li, Thomas Sin, Ball Meng, Snow Suen, Frankie Choi, Joseph Lee, Jenny Wong, Yuki Law, Carisa Yan, Calvin Chan, Eileen Yeow, Willie Lau, Penny Chan, Sheldon Lo, Julian Yik Yu Hong, Lee Hoi Sang, Chun Kai Wai. Man Yeung, Parkman Raphael Wong, Henry Lo, Michael Wai, Roxanne Ho	The King (我是王) by James Ng	15.9	Sports, Drama	
27 Dec- 07 Jan (to 2022)	Hello Missfortune 愛上我的衰神	10	Dave Fong (producer); Sandy Osan (choreographer); Hubert Wu, Erica Chan, Mark Ma Kwun Tung, Mayanne Mak, Law Lan, C.Kwan, Timothy Cheng, Susan Tse, Lincoln Hui, Vivian Koo, June Ng, Willie Lau, Eddie Li, Doris Chow, Chiu Lok Yin, Irina Tang, Au Ming Miu, Alvin Ng	Never knew (太多不知道) by Hubert Wu With you (我要和你在一起) by Vivian Koo	16.8	Fantasy, Love Comedy, Drama	

== Weekend Dramas ==
Starting on 05 Dec 2021 until 13 Feb 2022, these dramas air in Hong Kong from 8:30pm to 9:30pm, Sunday on Jade.

Broadcast	English title (Chinese title)	Eps.	Cast and crew	Theme song(s)	Avg. rating	Genre	Notes	Official website
05 Dec- 13 Feb (to 2022)	Forever Young at Heart 青春本我	10	Erica Li (producer); Yu-Fong Peng (director); Gigi Yim, Chantel Yiu, Windy Zhan, Yumi Chung, Aeren Man, Sherman Poon, Kaitlyn Lam, Venus Lam, Lolita Tsoi, Aska Cheung, Archie Sin, Rock Ho, Eden Lau, Lee Siu-kin, Felix Lam, Steven Suen, Hugo Wong, Joey Wong, James Ng, Brian Chu, Andy Lin, Shing Maverick Mak, Wong Cho-lam, Jinny Ng, Tania Chan, Patrick Dunn, Strawberry Yeung, Philip Keung, Alice Chan, Angela Tong, Chin Ka-lok	Forever young at heart (青春本我) theme song by Rock Ho, Archie Sin	14.8	School Campus, Music and dance, Youth Psychology		
