= The Unusual Prosecutor =

2026 Hong Kong drama series

The Unusual Prosecutor (Chinese: 非常檢控觀) is a 25-episode law drama series produced by TVB starring Joe Ma, Ricco Ng, Winki Lai, Alice Chan, Hera Chan, Kayan Yau, Angel Chiang and Aska Cheung, with Lam Chi Wah as Executive Producer, Steffie Lai as Script Editor. Characters and cases of the plot are considered to be inspired by folk tales related to Bao Qingtian (Bao Zheng) such as The Seven Heroes and Five Gallants.

== Plot ==
This drama tells the story of Senior Assistant Director of Public Prosecutions Pau Hei-yan, a justice-driven prosecutor who suffers from mirror-touch synesthesia, giving him extraordinary tactile sensitivity and empathy. Together with his subordinate Gung-sun Pok and police officer Chin Hung-fai, he investigates various cases to uncover the truth, determined to bring justice to the victims.

== Cast ==
- Joe Ma as Pau Hei-Yan (Chinese: 包希仁), a mirror-touch synesthetic Senior Assistant Director of Public Prosecutions
  - Nicholas Yuen as young Pau Hei-yan
- Ricco Ng as Chin Hung-fai (展熊飛), a Senior Inspector of Police
  - Hugo Chan as young Chin Hung-fai
- Winki Lai as Gung-sun Pok (公孫珀), a Legal Secretary assisting Pau
- Alice Chan as Wong Chung-sing (王頌星), a barrister-turned-Deputy Director of Public Prosecutions
  - Joey Leung as young Wong Chung-sing
- Aska Cheung as Chiu Zhi-ching (趙子幀), a Trainee Prosecutor
- Hera Chan as Chun Sheung-yin (秦湘言), a crime survivor aided by Pau's before becoming his clerk
- Kayan Yau as Pak Yat-tung (白逸桐), an orphan familiar with Chin

== Viewership ==
Week	Date	Peak viewership	Audience size	Source
1	19 January 2026 to 23 January 2026	19.7 points	1.27 million	
2	26 January 2026 to 1 February 2026	19.1 points	1.23 million	
