= Winki Lai =

Hong Kong actress and television host

- 賴慰玲
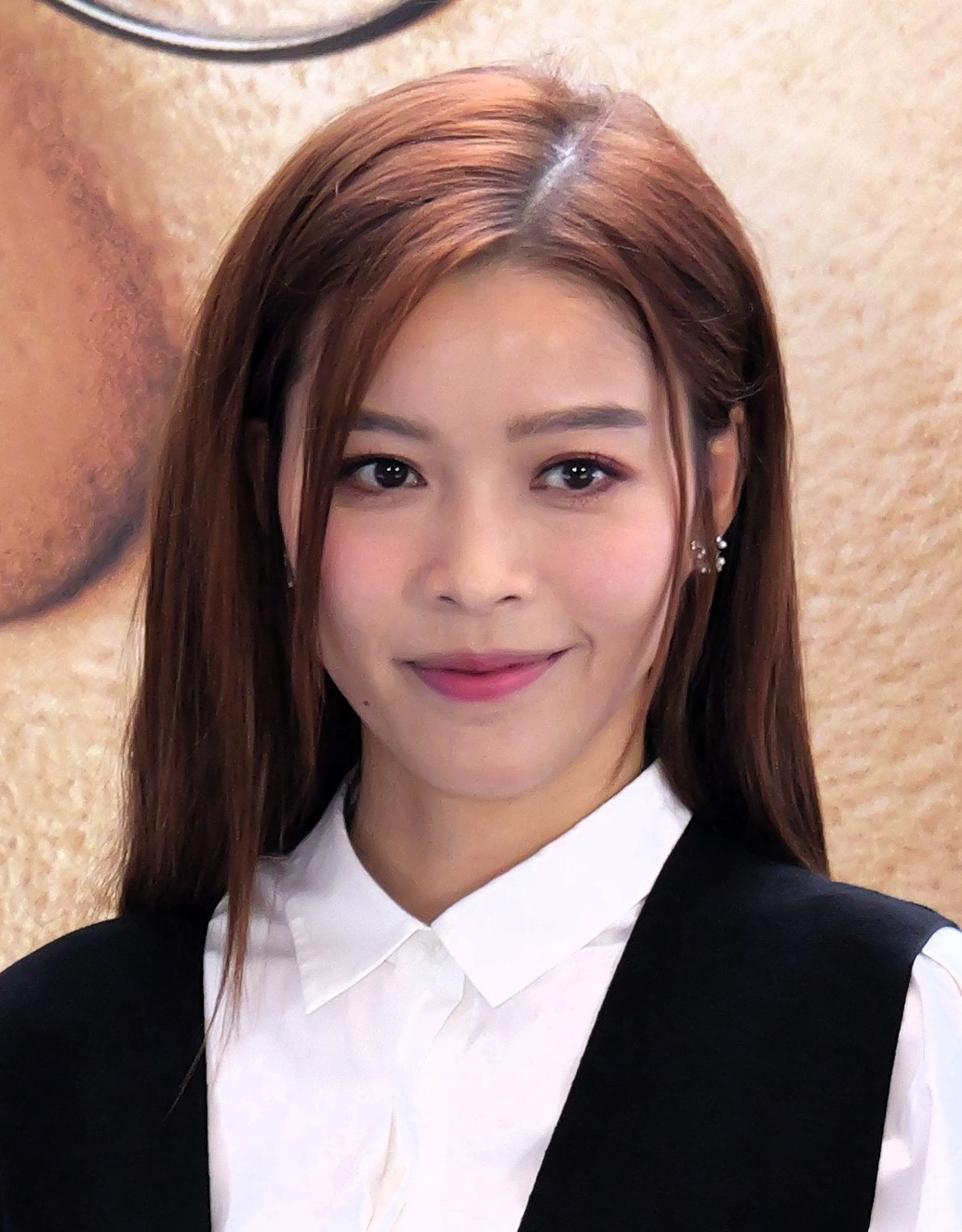
- Lai in 2024
- Born: 8 July 1986 (age 40); British Hong Kong
- Occupations: Actress, Television host
- Years active: 2013 – present
- Agent: TVB (2014 – present)
- Spouse: Benny Leung (m. 2017)
- Children: Marat Leung (son) b. 3 December 2017
- Relatives: 2 older brothers
- Awards: TVB Anniversary Awards – Best Supporting Actress; 2020 Al Cappuccino

Chinese name
- Traditional Chinese: 賴慰玲
- Simplified Chinese: 赖慰玲
Transcriptions
Standard Mandarin
- Hanyu Pinyin: Lài Wèi Líng
Yue: Cantonese
- Jyutping: Lai4 Wei4 Ling2

Winki Lai (Chinese: 賴慰玲; Jyutping: Lai Wai-ling; born 8 July 1986) is a Hong Kong actress and television host. She has been a TVB artiste since 2014.

== Early life ==
Winki Lai was born in Hong Kong. She studied at ELCHK Ma On Shan Lutheran Primary School and Chinese YMCA College. Lai joined the drama club in secondary school. Although she was admitted to the acting department of the Hong Kong Academy for Performing Arts in Form 5, she gave up the opportunity to advance to university. It was not until two years later that one of her A-level scores failed and she could not enter her desired degree, Lai officially enrolled in the Bachelor of Arts with Honours in the Performing Department of The Hong Kong Academy for Performing Arts. She won the Hong Kong Bank Foundation Hong Kong-Mainland Exchange Scholarship and the Lai Cho-tin Memorial Scholarship during her schooling.

== Career ==
After graduating in 2011, Lai became a stage actress and radio host. In 2013, she was recommended by her teacher Lo Koon-lan from The Academy of Performing Arts to participate in the audition for the TVB drama Never Dance Alone and set foot in the entertainment industry. During the audition, she played the seven characters alone and was finally selected for the role of the teen version of Hui Chun Nei in the drama. During the filming of the play, producer Eric Tsang asked her to help Rachel Lee, who had been unable to enter the play after she had quit the entertainment industry for many years, to analyze the script. After the drama was broadcast, her performance began to impress viewers.

In 2014, when Lai participated in the drama Lord Of Shanghai, well-known veteran actor Anthony Wong highly praised her, naming her Little Ling (Little Carol Cheng). In 2016, she played the role of Yau Ling-mui in the drama Blue Veins, in which her performance was once again praised by netizens. In 2017, she starred in the drama Destination Nowhere, collaborating with Kevin Cheng for the second time.

On 27 July 2018, Lai switched from the TVB basic artiste contract to the manager contract.

In 2020, Lai was highly praised for her performance and couple collaboration with Owen Cheung, in the comedy drama Al Cappuccino, which earned her first nominations for both Best Supporting Actress and Most Popular Female Character at the TVB Anniversary Awards 2020. She eventually won the former award.

As a stage actress, Lai has performed in a number of troupe works and served as the master of ceremonies for the "23rd Hong Kong Drama Awards". In addition, she has hosted Taoist TV programs broadcast by Now TV, such as Dao Tong Tian Di, Road Express, Life Sweet Silk and Healthy Cooking.

== Personal life ==
Lai is good friends with Kandy Wong, Annice Ng, Cheronna Ng, Jeannie Chan, Anjaylia Chan and Venus Wong, whom of all had starred in the drama Never Dance Alone. In 2020, Lai, along with Sisley Choi, Jeannie Chan, Stephanie Ho, Anjaylia Chan and Cheronna Ng, formed the friendship group SÏXTERS.

In July 2017, Lai announced her pregnancy via Instagram. In August 2017, she married her stage actor boyfriend of 5 years, Benny Leung. On 3 December 2017, she gave birth to their son, Marat.

== Filmography ==
=== Television dramas ===
Year	Title	Role	Notes
2014	Never Dance Alone	Young Hui Chun Nei 許珍妮（年輕版）	Younger version of Angie Cheong’s character
2015	Lord Of Shanghai	Kiu Siu Lei 喬小莉	Supporting Role
2016	Blue Veins	Yau Ling Mui 丘玲梅	Major Supporting Role
2016	Come Home Love: Dinner At 8	Yiu Ka Moon 姚嘉滿	Ep.16
2016	My Dangerous Mafia Retirement Plan	Young So Yau Miu 蘇佑妙（年輕版）	Younger version of Kingdom Yuen’s character
2016	Presumed Accidents	Mok Hei Tung (Madam Mok) 莫曦彤（彤姐）	Supporting Role
2017	May Fortune Smile On You	Ng Hiu Ting 吳曉婷	Major Supporting Role
2017	Destination Nowhere	Man Tsz Yu 萬子瑜	Major Supporting Role
2017	Provocateur	To Chi Yan 杜志仁（忍忍）	Major Supporting Role
2017	The Exorcist's Meter	Young Leung Ching Ching 梁晶晶（年輕版）	Younger version of Susan Tse’s character
2017-2018	My Ages Apart	Audience	Ep. 50
2018	Stealing Seconds	"Yan" Yau Yan Yan 丘茵茵（阿Yan）	Major Supporting Role
2018	Deep in the Realm of Conscience	Yiu Sze Yuen 姚思源	Supporting Role
2019	ICAC Investigators 2019	Nancy Lam Sui Yi 林瑞兒	Ep.4
2020	Airport Strikers	Tsang Hiu Sun 曾曉晨	Supporting Role
2020	The Exorcist's 2nd Meter	Young Leung Ching Ching 梁晶晶（年輕版）	Younger version of Susan Tse’s character
2020	Death By Zero	Leng Po 靚寶	Supporting Role
2020	Al Cappuccino	Carmen Chiang Chin Ha 蔣千霞	Major Supporting Role; TVB Anniversary Award for Best Supporting Actress
2021	Shadow of Justice	Kau Sing 裘勝（Win姐）	Major Supporting Role
2021	The Ringmaster	Hazel Man Sin Yin 文善言	Major Supporting Role
2021	Flying Tiger 3	Lee Wai Lan 李惠蘭	Supporting Role
2022	Stranger Anniversary	Ha Chim Chim 夏纖纖	Major Supporting Role
2024	Happily Ever After?	Gina Lui Ching Lam 呂靜林	Main Role
2026	The Unusual Prosecutor	Kung-suen Pak 公孫珀	Main Role

=== Variety shows ===
Year	Title	Notes
2013	Super Trio Maximus	Ep.26 guest
2014	Never Dance - Alone Happy Together	Guest
2014	Community Chest Charity Show	Performer
2014	Easy Living	Ep.16 guest
2014	TVB Most Popular TV Commercial Awards	Performer
2014	Walk the Walk, Talk the Talk	Ep.6 - 8 guest
2014	Neighborhood Treasures（Sr. 6）	Ep.16 guest
2014	TVB Anniversary Gala Show 2014	Performer
2014	Tung Wah Charity Gala 2014	Performer
2014	TVB Awards Presentation 2014	Guest
2015	Own Sweet Home	18 / 1 guest
2015	All Things Girl	Series 5 Ep.75 guest
2015	Sidewalk Scientist	Series Ep.4 guest
2016年	Buzz Stop	Ep.29 guest（With Blue Veins cast）
2016年	The Green Room	25 / 4 guest（With Wong You Nam）
2016年	EatLaMen	Ep.9 guest（With Blue Veins cast）
2016年	Buzz Stop	Ep.47 guest（With Destination Nowhere cast）
2016年	Midnight Munchiesremoved; no wiki link	Series 3 Ep.30 guest
2016年	Big Boys Club	Ep.1737, 1738 guest（With Spring Fever Hotel cast）
2016年	I Heart HK	Ep.17 guest（With Spring Fever Hotel cast）
2016年	TVB Sales Presentation 2017	Guest（With Destination Nowhere cast）
2017	Scoop	Performer（2 - 6 / 1 big big channel KOL recruitment & promotion, with Derek Wong）
2017	Po Leung Kuk CNY Special	Performer（With May Fortune Smile On You cast）
2017	Pleasure & Leisure	10 / 5 guest
2018	The Fantastic Trio Is Back	Guest
2018	Do Did Eat	Series 2 Ep.15 guest（With Kelly Cheung, Sisley Choi & Anjaylia Chan）
2018	big big channel Gaming: Mahjong (big big channel)	Performer（3/ 5, With Arnold Kwok & Emily Wong）
2018	Once Upon A Time In Tiny Hong Kong	Host（With Gilbert Lam, Agnes Lam & Anthony Chow）
2018	The Green Room	13 / 6 guest（With Gilbert Lam, Agnes Lam & Anthony Chow）
2018	Cooking Beauties	Contestant (Ep.8)
2018	TVB Awards Presentation 2018	Performer
2020	Do Did Eat	Series 4 Ep.22 guest（With Cheronna Ng, Snow Suen & Kelly Fu）

=== Films ===
Year	Title	Role
2014	（Chinese: 猜謎）	Alice
2014	Break Up 100	Big eater 大胃女
2015	S for Sex, S for Secret	May 美芬
2015	Wonder Mama	Kei 琪
2015	The Crossing: Part 2	Miss Kau 九姑娘
2016	29+1	Tina
TBA	Anti-fraud Hero	

=== Stage plays ===
Year	Title	Role
2009	（Chinese: 我們明白了）	Hong Kong student 香港學生
2011	（Chinese: 在那遙遠的星球，一粒沙）	
2011	The Bald Soprano	Martin's wife 馬田太太
2011	The Notebook	Twin（Younger） 細孖
2012	Se una notte d'inverno un viaggiatore	
2012	Nitehawk	Myra
2012	Drama Gallery: The Legardary of Ji Gong	
2013	Drama Gallery: The Legardary of Che Kung	
2013	（Chinese: 一切原本井井有條）	Sze 阿詩
2014	Drama Gallery: Drama Gallery: The Legardary of Lai Bu Yi	
2014	Harold Pinter - The Birthday Party	
2016	Spring Fever Hotel	Wai Chun 懷春

=== Radio programmes ===
Year	Title	Notes
2013	New Cultural Campaign	RTHK Radio 5, Ep.8 & 33 guest
2013	Your 18 districts	RTHK Radio 5, Host
2013	Essence Of Plays	RTHK Radio 5, Host（until 23 / 3 / 2015）

=== TVC ===
Year	Title
2014	Watsons「M Club - 脂肪當錢駛」
2017	Shiseido「White Lucent 櫻花美透白照相體驗」
2017	Banila Co「Clean it Zero之特卸！」
2017	Master Finance Company Ltd.「義氣姐」
2017	Nestlé（Hong Kong）「NESTLÉ MOM 鎖養膠囊 - 鎖養故事：盡在掌握『營』」
2017	Nestlé（Hong Kong）「NESTLÉ MOM 鎖養膠囊 - 想幫自己同 BB 做好鎖養準備？」
2018年	Merz Pharma「Contractubex」
2018年	Jurlique「草本亮肌精華 - 做我最強後盾 保持肌膚嫩滑透亮」

== Discography ==
=== Soundtrack appearances ===
- 2014："Let's Dance" (Never Dance Alone Ending Theme, With Anjaylia Chan, Cheronna Ng, Kandy Wong, Venus Wong & Annice Ng)

== Awards and nominations ==
Year	Award	Result
2014	The 6th Hong Kong Theatre Libre for Excellent Actresses - ie Studio《一切原本井井有條》」	Nominated
2018	Hong Kong TV Award for Show Host Award	Nominated
2020	TVB Anniversary Award for Best Supporting Actress	Won
2020	TVB Anniversary Award for Most Popular Female Character	Top 5
2021	TVB Anniversary Award for Best Supporting Actress	Top 10
2021	TVB Anniversary Award for Most Popular Female Character	Nominated
2021	TVB Anniversary Award for Most Popular Onscreen Partnership (with Wayne Lai)	Nominated
2021	TVB Anniversary Award for Best Female Show Host	Nominated
2022	TVB Anniversary Award for Best Supporting Actress	Top 10
2022	TVB Anniversary Award for Most Popular Female Character	Nominated
2022	TVB Anniversary Award for Best Female Show Host	Top 10
