= Fairy Tale Killer =

2012 Hong Kong film by Danny Pang

- Film poster
- Directed by: Danny Pang Phat
- Written by: Danny Pang; Szeto Kam-yuen; Jessica Chu; Wu Mengzhang
- Produced by: Alvin Lam; Danny Pang; Dong Peiwen; Zhang Zhao; Cheung Hong-tat; Ren Yue
- Starring: Sean Lau; Wang Baoqiang; Elanne Kong; Joey Meng; Kelly Fu
- Cinematography: Decha Srimanta
- Edited by: Curran Pang
- Music by: Ronald Ng
- Production companies: Universe Entertainment; Le Vision Pictures; Sil-Metropole Organisation; Enable Film Production; Films Station Production
- Distributed by: Universe Entertainment
- Release date: 11 May 2012 (Hong Kong)
- Running time: 93 minutes
- Country: Hong Kong
- Language: Cantonese
- Box office: US$467,327

Fairy Tale Killer (追凶, Pupil in Chinese) is a 2012 Hong Kong horror film directed by Danny Pang Phat. The film was released on 11 May 2012, and stars Sean Lau, Wang Baoqiang, and Elanne Kong. The Fairy Tale Killer follows police detective Wong Wai-han as he investigates a series of brutal murders.

== Plot ==
When a bloodied and incoherent Wu Zaijun confesses to five murders that have not occurred, the police assume that he is mentally unstable and ignore his claims. Police detective Wong Wai-han is investigating a series of gruesome murders, but soon discovers that all is not as it seems and that not only are the murders connected, but that Jun is tied to them in some way.

== Cast ==
- Sean Lau as Wong Wai-han
- Wang Baoqiang as Wu Zaijun
- Elanne Kong as Wong Yue-yee
- Joey Meng as Wai
- Ken Lo as Old Guy
- Lam Suet as Cheung Fai
- Felix Lok as Commander Chan
- Elena Kong as Chiu Lan
- James Ho as Simon
- Gary Chiu as Sai
- Anson Leung as pathologist
- Kelly Fu as Cindy
- Ciwi Lam
- Rex Ho
- Lam Ying-yuen
- Carolyn Chan
- Yip Wan-keung
- Kunpimook Bhuwakul as Wong Wai-han's son

== Reception ==
The movie review site Twitch panned the film, expressing disappointment in the acting range of Wang Baoqiang in the film. The Xinhua News Agency praised the film's acting, but criticized the film's ending as too bizarre and not always coherent.
