= Sisley Choi =

Hong Kong actress

Sisley Choi Sea-Pui
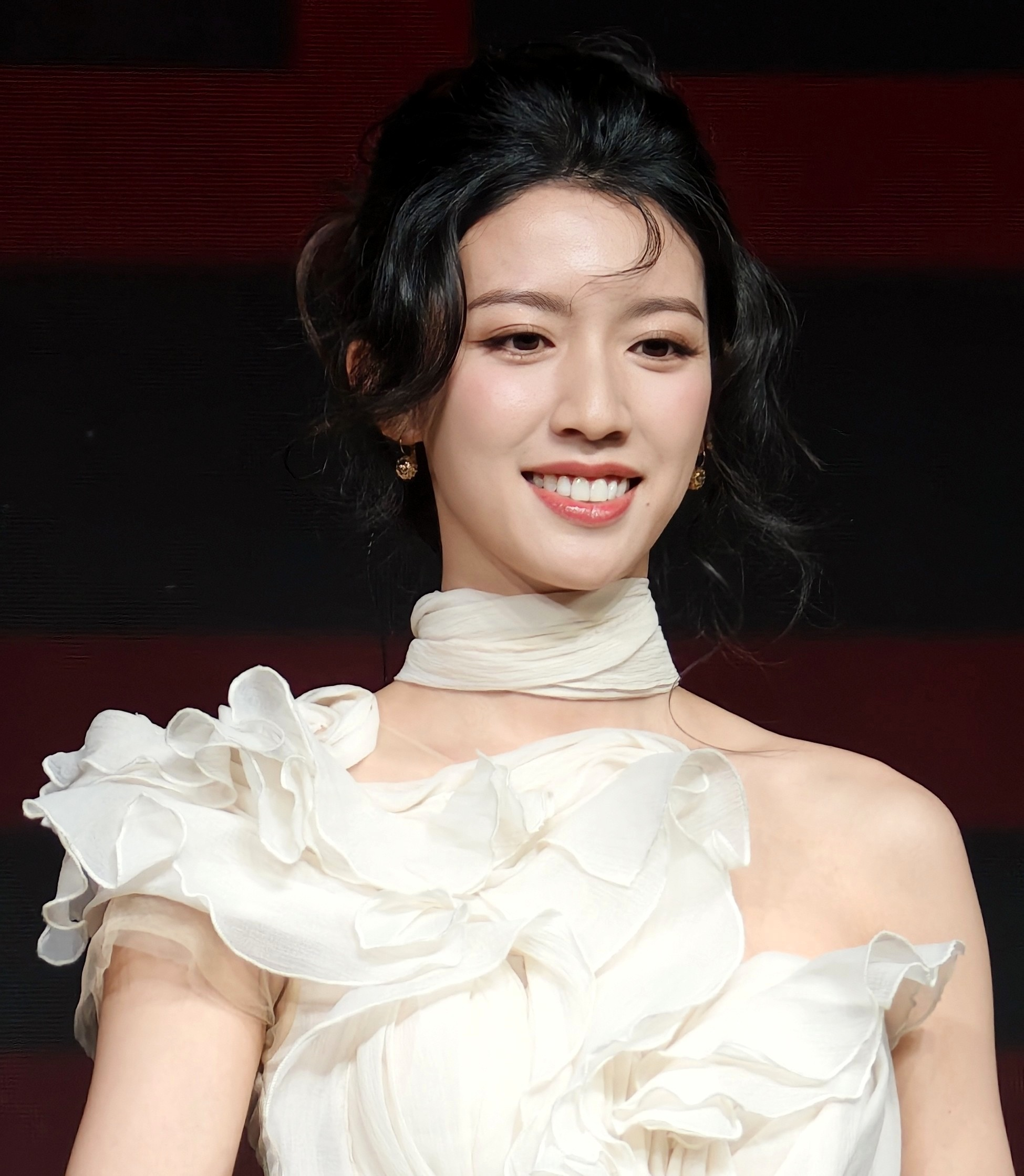
- Choi in 2026
- Born: Choi Sea-Pui; British Hong Kong
- Education: Heidelberg University – Ethnology; Bulacan State University – Bachelor of Science
- Occupations: Actress; presenter
- Years active: 2013–present
- Notable work: Legal Mavericks series
- Awards: TVB Anniversary Awards – Most Popular Female Character; 2017 Legal Mavericks; Best Actress; 2020 Legal Mavericks 2020

Chinese name
- Traditional Chinese: 蔡思貝
- Simplified Chinese: 蔡思贝
Transcriptions
Standard Mandarin
- Hanyu Pinyin: Cài Sībèi
Yue: Cantonese
- Jyutping: Coi3 si1 bui3

Sisley Choi Sea-Pui (traditional Chinese: 蔡思貝; simplified Chinese: 蔡思贝; pinyin: Cài Sībèi; Cantonese Yale: Coi3 Si1Bui3) is a Hong Kong actress.

== Early life and career ==
Born Choi Sea-Pui, she was born in Hong Kong and her ancestry can be traced back to Zhongshan, Guangdong. Her father was a police officer, which is the reason why Choi has stated her childhood education was quite strict. However, on television, Choi recalled her father's strict discipline was correct so that she can become a good person.

Choi attended Po Primary School and St. Paul Middle School, and went abroad to study in Oamaru, New Zealand when she was thirteen. She boarded at Waitaki Girls’ High School from 2005 to 2009. The experience encouraged her to continue her adventures abroad; she later went to Germany and spent three years as an au pair and to study ethnology and became fluent with the German language.

In 2013, Choi withdrew from her studies and went back to Hong Kong to participate in the Miss Hong Kong pageant, in which she won first runner-up. She was then contracted to TVB and made her acting debut in the 2014 drama Overachievers and took on her first female leading role in the 2015 drama Young Charioteers.

Choi won the Most Popular Female Character award at the 2017 TVB Anniversary Awards with her role in the legal drama Legal Mavericks. With the same role in the sequel Legal Mavericks 2020, she won the Best Actress award at the 2020 TVB Anniversary Awards, becoming the first post-90s TVB actress and the second youngest one after Ada Choi in 1998 to win the title.

In March 2026, Choi left TVB after her contract expired, ending her 13-year relationship with the station.

=== Friendship ===
In 2020, Choi along with Winki Lai, Jeannie Chan, Stephanie Ho, Anjaylia Chan, and Cheronna Ng, formed the friendship group "SÏXTERS". She is also good friends with Grace Wong, Roxanne Tong, and Vivien Yeo.

== Filmography ==
=== Television dramas (TVB) ===
Year	Title	Role	Notes
2014	Overachievers 《名門暗戰》	Ma Siu-ming 馬小明	Supporting Role
2014	Officer Geomancer 《八卦神探》	So Sin-man 蘇倩敏	Supporting Role
2015	Young Charioteers 《衝線》	Moon Yeung-Kwong 陽光	Main Role
2016	Speed of Life 《鐵馬戰車》	Pui Sum-yau (Pui Sum) 貝心柔 (貝心)	Main Role
2016	Fashion War 《潮流教主》	Yannes Cheung Yat-Ning 張逸寧	Main Role
2016	Presumed Accidents 《純熟意外》	Eunice Yan Yin 殷然	Main Role; TVB Star Awards Malaysia for Top 15 Favourite TVB Drama Characters
2017	Recipes to Live By 《味想天開》	Shek Yau 石柔	Main Role
2017	My Dearly Sinful Mind 《心理追兇 Mind Hunter》	Moon Tung Yuet 童月	Main Role
2017	Legal Mavericks 《踩過界》	Deanie Chiu Ching-Mui 趙正妹	Main Role; StarHub TVB Awards for My Favourite TVB Female TV Characters; TVB Star Awards Malaysia for Favourite Top 15 TVB Drama Characters; TVB Anniversary Award for Most Popular Female Character
2018	The Learning Curve of a Warlord 《大帥哥》	Cheung Yuen-Yuen 章沅婉	Main Role
2019	The Defected 《鐵探》	Jill Chiu Hei-Yuet 招喜悅	Main Role
2020	Airport Strikers 《機場特警》	San Hoi-ching (San Chai) 辛凱晴 (辛仔)	Main Role
2020	Line Waker: Bull Fight 《使徒行者3》	Dau Nga-Hei (Ah Dau) 竇亞希 (阿兜)	Main Role
2020	Legal Mavericks 2020 《踩過界II》	Deanie Chiu Ching-Mui 趙正妹	Main Role; TVB Anniversary Award for Best Actress
2022	ICAC Investigators 2022 《廉政行動2022》	Lee Chun-yi 李進兒	Main Role
2022	Forensic Heroes V 《法證先鋒V》	Taya Tam Sin-Man 譚倩雯	Main Role
2023	Let Me Take Your Pulse 《你好，我的大夫》	Ching Ka-Ying 程嘉應	Main Role
2024	The Airport Diary 《飛常日誌》	Cheung Yeuk-Ling 張若玲	Main Role

=== Television dramas (Shaw Brothers Studio) ===
Year	Title	Role	Notes
2021	Flying Tiger 3 《飛虎之壯志英雄》	Yu Hiu-yan	Major Supporting Role
2022	Mission Run 《廉政狙擊•黑幕》	Lai Hiu-shan	Main Role

=== Film ===
Year	Title	Role	Notes
2015	Keeper of Darkness	Fong Tsz-ling	Nominated — 35th Hong Kong Film Awards for Best New Performer
2026	Kung Fu Soccer	Ziba	
TBA	Endless Battle		

== Awards and nominations ==
=== TVB Anniversary Awards ===
Year	Nominee / work	Award	Result
2015	Young Charioteers	Best Actress	Nominated
2016	Speed of Life	Best Actress	Nominated
2017	Legal Mavericks	Best Actress	Nominated
2017	Legal Mavericks	Most Popular Female Character	Won
2018	The Learning Curve of a Warlord	Best Actress	Nominated
2018	The Learning Curve of a Warlord	Most Popular Female Character	Nominated
2019	The Defected	Best Actress	Nominated
2019	The Defected	Most Popular Female Character	Nominated
2020	Legal Mavericks 2020	Best Actress	Won
2020	Legal Mavericks 2020	Favourite TVB Actress in Malaysia	Top 5
2020	Line Waker: Bull Fight	Most Popular Female Character	Top 5
2020	Line Waker: Bull Fight	Most Popular On-Screen Partnership (with Owen Cheung)	Nominated
2022	ICAC Investigators 2022	Best Actress	Nominated
2022	Forensic Heroes V	Best Actress	Nominated
2022	ICAC Investigators 2022	Most Popular Female Character	Nominated
2022	Forensic Heroes V	Most Popular Female Character	Nominated
2022	ICAC Investigators 2022	Favourite TVB Actress in Malaysia	Nominated
2022	Forensic Heroes V	Favourite TVB Actress in Malaysia	Nominated
2022	Forensic Heroes V	Most Popular On-screen Partnership (with Benjamin Yuen)	Nominated
2023	Let Me Take Your Pulse	Best Actress	Top 10
2023	Let Me Take Your Pulse	Favourite TVB Actress in Malaysia	Nominated
2023	England Go Go Goal!, Europe Go Go Go!	Best Female Host	Top 10

=== TVB Star Awards Malaysia ===
Year	Nominee / work	Award	Result
2015	Young Charioteers	Top 16 Favourite TVB Drama Characters	Nominated
2015	Young Charioteers	Favourite TVB Most Improved Female Artiste	Nominated
2015	Officer Geomancer	Favourite TVB Most Improved Female Artiste	Nominated
2016	Fashion War	Favourite TVB Actress	Nominated
2016	Presumed Accidents	Top 15 Favourite TVB Drama Characters	Won
2016	—	Online Most Beloved Star Award 2016	Nominated
2017	Legal Mavericks	Favourite TVB Actress	Nominated
2017	Legal Mavericks	Top 17 Favourite TVB Drama Characters	Won
2017	Legal Mavericks	Favourite TVB On-Screen Couple (with Vincent Wong, Tracy Chu)	Nominated

=== StarHub TVB Awards ===
Year	Nominee / work	Award	Result
2016	Fashion War	My Favourite TVB Actress	Nominated
2016	Fashion War	My Favourite TVB Female TV Characters	Nominated
2017	Legal Mavericks	My Favourite TVB Actress	Nominated
2017	Legal Mavericks	My Favourite TVB Female TV Characters	Won

=== Hong Kong Film Award ===
Year	Nominee / work	Award	Result
2016	Keeper of Darkness	Best New Performer	Nominated

=== People’s Choice Television Awards ===
Year	Nominee / work	Award	Result
2017	Legal Mavericks	People’s Choice Most Improved Female Artiste	Nominated (Ranked 3rd)

Preceded by Jacqueline Wong 黃心穎	Miss Hong Kong Pageant 1st Runner-Up; 2013	Succeeded by Erin Wong 王卓淇
