= Legal Mavericks =

Hong Kong television series

- Official Promotional Poster
- 踩過界 / 盲俠大律師
- Genre: Legal; Crime; Detective; Superhero
- Created by: Lam Chi-wah
- Written by: Lau Choi-wan; Chan Kei; Lee Yi-wah
- Directed by: Lo Chun-wai; Lai Kai-yuen; Chin Wing-chi
- Starring: Vincent Wong; Sisley Choi; Ali Lee; Owen Cheung; Pal Sinn; Tracy Chu; Gilbert Lam; Quinn Ho; Hugo Wong
- Opening theme: Insight (心眼)
- Country of origin: Hong Kong
- Original languages: Cantonese (TVB Jade and iQiyi); Mandarin (iQiyi only)
- No. of episodes: 28

Production
- Producer: Lam Chi-wah
- Running time: 45 minutes
- Production company: TVB

Original release
- Network: TVB Jade, iQiyi
- Release: June 20, 2017 (iQiyi); June 24, 2017 (TVB Jade)

Related
- Legal Mavericks II

Legal Mavericks
- Traditional Chinese: 踩過界
- Simplified Chinese: 踩过界
Transcriptions
Standard Mandarin
- Hanyu Pinyin: Cǎiguòjiè
Yue: Cantonese
- Yale Romanization: Cháaigwogaai
- Jyutping: Caai2gwo3gaai3
- IPA: [tsʰǎːi̯.kʷɔ̄ː.kāːi̯]

Alternative Chinese name
- Traditional Chinese: 盲俠大律師
- Simplified Chinese: 盲侠大律师
Transcriptions
Standard Mandarin
- Hanyu Pinyin: Mángxiá Dàlǜshī
Yue: Cantonese
- Yale Romanization: Màahnghaahp Daaihleuhtsī
- Jyutping: Maang4haap6 Daai6leot6si1

Legal Mavericks (Chinese: 踩過界; Cantonese Yale: Cháaigwogaai; literally “Crossing the Line") is a Legal, Crime, Detective television drama created by Lam Chi-wah and TVB. It began principal photography in October 2016. It aired concurrently on TVB Jade, and iQiyi. It stars Vincent Wong, Sisley Choi, Ali Lee, Owen Cheung, Pal Sinn, Tracy Chu, Gilbert Lam, Quinn Ho and Hugo Wong in the first season. The second season of this drama aired in 2020.

== Synopsis ==
Since losing his eyesight in an accident, Man Sun-Hop has been continually harassed and despised. But instead, his determination and perseverance are so reinforced that he has qualified as a barrister. He has also developed an acute sense beyond sight which helps him to gain the status of Blind Legal Knight in the legal profession. However, nobody really knows his true character. Fortunately, Kuk Yat-Ha, his flatmate and private detective, and Chiu Ching-Mui, a legal executive with mob connections, are two buddies he can always rely on. The trio is known as the "Three Sword Fighters" who defy the powerful and are always ready to seek justice for the underprivileged. Sun-Hop’s provocative style has aroused the fancy of judge Wong Lai-Fan, which leads to her flirting unabashedly at him. Expanded to a quartet, their fate encounters turbulent changes while handling challenging legal cases. The reappearance of Sun-Hop’s father, Man Gun-Ying, and Tai Tin-Yan, his ex-girlfriend from college, further complicates the situation, which Sun-Hop may not be able to unravel with his legal mastery.

== Cast and characters ==
- Vincent Wong as Hope Man San-hap (文申俠), a blind barrister who strives for justice for the disadvantaged, using his other heightened senses and legally controversial methods to seek truths behind his court cases.
- Sisley Choi as Deanie "Dino" Chiu Ching-mui (趙正妹), a legal executive working for Hope, who has a heroic spirit due to her mafia family background. In addition to being a law clerk, she also owns a bar called Pledge.
- Ali Lee as Cherry "Never" Wong Lai-fan (王勵凡), a district court judge who is unafraid to challenge the conservative nature of the legal system.
- Owen Cheung as Gogo Kuk Yat-ha (谷一夏), an ex-policeman turned private investigator due to an accident whilst investigating T.Y.. He becomes Hope Man's roommate.
- Pal Sinn as T.Y. Tai Tak-yan (戴德仁), a cruel and ruthless businessman who has terrible relations with his two children due to his hunger for power. He is Yanice's father.
- Tracy Chu as Yanice Tai Tin-yan (戴天恩), an ophthalmologist who is constantly at heads with her father due to his problematic parenting methods. She is Hope Man's ex-girlfriend from university.
- Gilbert Lam, as Gotham Wei Gwok-haam SC (韋國涵), a famous and arrogant barrister. He is one of Hope Man's major recurring opponents in court. Former mentor of Never and Walter
- Quinn Ho as Luk Ka Yat (陸加一), a friend of Gogo working at the police station.
- Hugo Wong as Walter Wa Ye (華爺), a prosecutor who is skeptical of Hope Man's questionable methods of treating court cases.
- Jack Hui as Tai Tin-yau (戴天佑), T.Y.'s son and Yanice's older brother. He was mentally and physical abuse by his father, Tai Tak-yan. He turn himself to police in episode 7 for illegal detention and mentally abusing of Suki .
- Law Lok-lam as Man Gan-ying (文根鹰), Hope's father, who abandoned Hope at the age of 6 not long after he went blind. He is diagnosed with ALS.
- Chun Wong as Chiu Cheong-Fung (趙翔鳳), Dino's father, an ex prominent member of the mafia.
- William Chak as Aiden Ching Lap-Kiu (程立橋), Yanice's ex-fiancé.
- Toby Chan as Annie (Poon On) (潘安), a transgender woman working as a kindergarten teacher. A friend of Deanie, she became a client of Hope Man after she became a defendant in the Transgender indecent assault case (Episode 10-13)
- Li Fung
- Bob Cheung as Lau Chi-Sum (劉子琛), a mentally-disabled person framed for giving poison to dogs. A client of Hope Man, defendant in the Mentally handicapped poison dog case (Episode 1 - 2)
- Raymond Chiu as Henry (Ah Chun), Friend of Gogo
- Ho Chun-hin as Liu Ting, gang leader who works for Tai Tak-yan.
- Zoie Tam as Ngai Yu-Chun (魏雨珍), a client of Hope Man, defence of the Female performance artist assaulting case (Episode 2 - 3)
- Alice Fung So-bor as Mrs. Lau, mother of Lau Chi-sim
- Fanny Lee as Bo Bui-yee (寶貝怡), Hope Man's landlord and Gogo's aunt.
- Tong Chun-ming as Dragon, employee of Pledge bar
- Tse Ho-yat as Tiger, employee of Pledge bar
- Virginia Lau as Zhu, employee of Pledge bar
- Hebe Chan as Hillary, Annie's girlfriend before she transitioned, who initially refuses to testify for her in the indecent assault case because Hillary does not want her current fiancé to find out she dated a trans woman.
- Poon Fong-fong as Kindergarten principal, Former supervisor of Annie (Poon On)
- Nicole Wan as Mrs.Wu, mother of David was a student of Annie. She accused Annie of alleged indecent in tennis court female locker room because her husband is a homosexual and she targeted discriminate against them.
- Otto Chan (actor) as Hilton, husband of Mrs.Wu and secretly a homosexual who has an affair with a physical trainer, Mountain
- Man Yeung as Fong Kin Chung, Husband of Yeung Mei Ling and father of Sing, client of Hope Man, defence of the Neglect of child care case (Episode 7-10)
- Janice Shum as Yeung Mei Ling, Stepmother of Sing, client of Hope Man, defence of the Neglect of child care case (Episode 7-10)
- Kimmi Tsui as Lee Wai Sze, Biological mother of Sing. Scheme and framed both Fong Kin Chung and Yeung Mei Ling for neglecting and child abuse to gain back the custody of kid Sing
- Chiu Lok-yin as Rivet, lackey of Liu Ting
- Aaryn Cheung as Wu, employee of Pledge bar

== Critical reception ==
Legal Mavericks received positive responses. On Douban, a Chinese media database, the drama received a rating of 7.9 out of 10 based on 5000+ votes.

The cast of Legal Mavericks won numerous awards the 2017 StarHub TVB Awards:

- FAVOURITE TVB ACTOR - Vincent Wong
- FAVOURITE TVB ACTRESS - Ali Lee
- FAVOURITE TVB SUPPORTING ACTOR - Owen Cheung
- FAVOURITE TVB FEMALE TV CHARACTERS - Sisley Choi and Tracy Chu

Vincent Wong won the Best Actor award at the 2017 TVB Anniversary Awards, and Sisley Choi won the Most Popular Female Character award with her role as Deanie Chiu.

In 2018, New York Festivals awarded Legal Mavericks as finalists in Best Screenplay and in Best Entertainment Program Open & Titles.
