= Al Cappuccino =

Hong Kong television series

- Chinese: 反黑路人甲
- Literal meaning: Anti-Triad Passerby
- Jyutping: faan2 hak1 lou6 jan4 gaap3
- Genre: Crime drama; Comedy
- Written by: Wong Wai-keung
- Starring: Vincent Wong; Owen Cheung; Crystal Fung; Kathy Yuen; Samantha Ko; David Chiang; Angel Chiang; Winki Lai; Kelly Fu; Brian Chu
- Country of origin: Hong Kong
- Original languages: Cantonese; Mandarin
- No. of episodes: 30

Production
- Executive producer: Lam Chi-wah
- Production location: Hong Kong
- Running time: 45 minutes
- Production company: TVB

Al Cappuccino (Chinese: 反黑路人甲) is a Hong Kong television crime comedy series produced by TVB. With Lam Chi-wah serving as executive producer, the series stars Vincent Wong as a struggling actor who gets hired by the OCTB of the Hong Kong Police Force to be a fake triad boss in order to solve a murder that is related to a gang.

The drama was produced under the working title Triad Weirdo, or Yakuza Weirdo (Chinese: 極道怪咖). Principal photography was in Hong Kong, and lasted from January to April 2019.

The drama series won six awards at the 2020 TVB Anniversary Awards, including the Best Drama award. Owen Cheung won the Most Popular Male Character award for his role as Ko Bun, Winki Lai was awarded the Best Supporting Actress award, and Angel Chiang and Brian Chu won the Most Improved Female Artiste and Most Improved Male Artiste awards respectively. In addition, Vincent Wong, Cheung, and Chu together won the Best Onscreen Partnership award for their collaboration.

== Synopsis ==
Cheung Sai-Lun (Vincent Wong): a struggling actor from Ohio with Hong Kong heritage comes back to Hong Kong to audition for a role in a film. However, he is wrapped up in a murder case involving the murder of triad boss: Old Chiang and his 2 sons, he is asked by Rachel Koo (Crystal Fung): an inspector of OCTB to become a spy in a triad for the police alongside the pre-existing spy: Ko Ban (Owen Cheung). He is "cast" as the Chiangs' long lost third son with the fact that the real son had been killed in a gang war beforehand.

Cheung soon gets acquainted with the three Chiang sisters: Chiang Chin-Ha (Winki Lai), Chiang Chin-Yu (Kelly Fu) and Chiang Chin-Wai (Serene Lim) as well as their uncle: Lui Ka-Cheong (Lee Shing-Cheong) and begins living with them. He also starts intimate friendships with celebrity actress Angel Chong (Samantha Ko) whose manager: Koo Wing-Cheung (Shek Sau) is the father of Racheal, Cherry So (Kathy Yuen), a high school teacher and daughter of one of the triad leaders: So Wai-Sun (nicknamed Old Fox) (David Chiang) and Yiu Ching-Shui (better known as Shui Je) (Angel Chiang) who is sent by her boss: Chung Chi-Sum (Tsui Wing) to seduce and spy on Chiang only to fall in love with him instead.

Throughout the series, both Cheung Sai-Lun and Ko Ban begin to discover more truths about the murder and begin to suspect that the real culprit may just be in the police force. Meanwhile, both Chung Chi-Sam and So Wai-Sun begin plotting to oust Chiang and become triad boss themselves.

== Cast ==
=== Main cast ===
- Vincent Wong as Cheung Sai-Lun (張細倫), a struggling actor who recently returned to Hong Kong. He is asked to impersonate his late friend Chiang Sai-lung (蔣世龍), the youngest son of the Chiang family to run for the seat of triad boss and help the police solve the murders of Old Chiang and his two sons. Due to him being close friends with the actual Chiang Sai-Lung, who was killed in a gang alteration, he agreed. After ascending to triad boss, he became the CEO of Chiang's Group. He was mocked at by Crazy Chung and the other elders for being physically weak and having a fake tattoo (made of body paint). Over time, he develops a close relationship with his sisters, Ko Ban and Luk Chau. He was led into a trap by Crazy Chung but Lung Chou protected him and got shot. He goes crazy and makes many controversial decisions such as attempting to bury Shui Jie alive and ousting Ko Ban from the Triad. He was later revealed to be faking his insanity so as to lure out Crazy Chung. However, his identity was exposed in Episode 28 but was saved by Chiang Chin-Ha, who switches her younger sister's DNA to change the results of the DNA test. After faking his death in Episode 29 in a car explosion, he feels guilty for leaving the triad in a mess, he returns as the triad boss in Episode 30. He returns to Hollywood after he completed his mission in Episode 30.
- Owen Cheung as Ko Ban (高彬), an undercover police officer who gets tied up working with Sai-Lun. He has a romantic relationship with Chiang Chin-Ha. His actual name is Ko Yuen (高遠), which was revealed in Episode 30 and promoted as probation inspector.
- Crystal Fung as Rachel Koo Yan-Yee (顧欣頤), an inspector of the OCTB and handler of Chiang Sai-Lung. She is frustrated of being treated like a vase in the Hong Kong Police Department and aims to use her undercover mission to prove herself. She is also the daughter of Koo Wing-Cheung.
- Kathy Yuen as So Tsz-Shan (蘇芷珊), a high school teacher and Master Sun's daughter. She wanted to be a teacher since she was young but faced opposition from her father, Master Sun. She was forced by Master San, to become the head of the gang in Episode 3. She was framed by Master Sun and arrested for money laundering in Episode 15 but was later released. She was shot by her brother, Iron Head, after he became insane. Ultimately recovers in Episode 30.
- Samantha Ko as Angel Chong Ming-Lai (莊明麗), a celebrity actress.

=== Supporting cast ===
- David Chiang as So Wai-San (蘇偉晨), known as Master San, a Triad elder and the leader of one of the four associated gangs in the Triad. He is also one of the brothers of Old Chiang. He is nicknamed the "Old Fox" （老狐狸）due to him faking his illness of cancer so as to allow the other gangs to think his gang is weak and ultimately to allow his son to fight for the triad boss position. His plan was revealed in Episode 15. He was revealed to be working in cahoots with Koo Wing-Cheung in money laundering in episode 16 and tries to frame his daughter but fails. He admitted that he was faking his illness to his daughter in episode 19. He became the temporary triad boss in episode 29 when he expressed his plans to dissolve the Triad, resulting in uproar. He was ousted from the Triad by Chiang Sai-Lung in Episode 30 and turned himself to the police after causing an injury to So Tsz-Shan.
- Angel Chiang as Yiu Ching-Shui (姚清水), also known as "Shui Jeh" (水姐）. She is a member of Crazy Chung's gang and is the gang's treasurer. However she ultimately falls for Chiang Sai-Lung and secretly helps him behind Crazy Chung's back.
- Winki Lai as Chiang Chin-Ha (蔣千霞), the eldest daughter of the Chiang family who heads what remains of the family. Has a romantic storyline with Ko Ban. Was knocked down by a truck in episode 23 (indirectly caused by Szeto Shun.) but recovers soon after.
- Kelly Fu as Chiang Chin-Yu (蔣千瑜), the middle daughter of the Chiang family, and Szeto Shun's ex-girlfriend. She gets manipulated by Szeto Shun to help him solve the case.
- Brian Chu as Luk Chau (陸秋), a boxer based in Thailand who returned to Hong Kong to protect Sai-Lun for the Chiang Alliance gang. Gets shot in episode 24 while trying to protect Chiang Sai Lung. Originally, it is thought that his legs were paralyses but it is revealed that it was all a ploy to get Crazy Chung out (minus the gun wound).
- Tsui Wing as Chung Chi-Sum (鍾志琛), a high-ranking member of Master Sun's rival gang. Nicknamed "Crazy Chung" due to his violent nature, he runs for the seat of triad boss, but ultimately loses to Chiang Sai Lung. He is arrested in Episode 30.
- Cheung Kwok Keung as Au Kin-Tak (歐健德), Deputy Commissioner of Police and the series main villain. He was a member of the Triad before being sent to become an undercover in the police force by Old Chiang in 1987 to help him take down rival gangs. He uses corrupt methods throughout the course of the series to become the Commissioner of Police. In Episode 29, he forces Master Sun to dissolve the triad. In the same episode, it was revealed that he was behind the murders of Old Chiang and his 2 elder sons. He ends up getting arrested in episode 30.
- Shek Sau as Koo Wing-Cheung (顧榮章), a wealthy producer and Rachel's father. Was previously involved with Chong Ming-Lai romantically but later separated. In cahoots with Au Kin Tak in his plan to push him to become the commissioner of police. Involved in money laundering with Master San and Old Chiang. Revealed that he was threatened by Old Chiang in money laundering to Rachel in Episode 28, he ends up working together with her in Episode 29 to solve the murders.
- Jack Hui as Szeto Shun (司徒信), a chief superintendent of OCTB. Au Kin-Tak's right-hand man. He looks down on Rachael as he thinks that she was able to become an inspector due to her father's connections with the higher ranks of the police. Has a wife and son who are living in Canada. Was previously in a relationship with Chiang Chin-Yu. Re-encounters Chiang Chin Yu in Episode 5 and manipulates her so as to solve the murder. Was exposed by Chiang Chin-Ha in episode 23. In his quest to gather more evidence, he caused Chiang Chin-Ha to be knocked down by a car in Episode 23. Was investigated by the internal police department in Episode 24 due to Chiang Chin-Yu lodging a complaint. Turns himself to the authorities in episode 30 after helping out with the arrest of KT.
- Serene Lim as Chiang Chin-Wai (蔣千惠), a college student and the youngest daughter of the Chiang family. She becomes a reporter and hides her job from the rest of her sisters. She discovers Chiang Sai Lung's true identity in Episode 18 but keeps it as a secret from her sisters. Later on in the series, Ko Ban and Chiang Sai Lung take photos of them kissing in the car so as to help them leave the Triad.
- Lee Shing-cheong as Lui Ka-Cheong (呂家昌), uncle of the Chiang sisters and strategizes for the Chiang Alliance gang and ex-policeman.
- Otto Chan as So Ji-Kin (蘇子堅). The son of So Wai-Sun, he is first revealed in Episode 3 as a prison inmate but is released in Episode 15 and returns to the triad. He is arrested in Episode 30.
- Chun Wong as Fei Suk (肥叔), one of the uncles in the family. He was a friend of Old Chiang and became closely affiliated with the Chiang family after his death.
- Albert Cheung as Lau Biu (劉彪). The leader of one of the four associated gangs in the triads, he gets arrested in Episode 30.
- Onitsuka Ng as Lum Fu (林福). The leader of one of the four associated gangs in the triads, he gets buried alive in Episode 18.
- Choi Kwok Hing as Yat Gor (一哥). The current police commissioner, he was introduced in Episode 9 and becomes Cheung Sai-Lun and Ko Ban's handler in Episode 26. He fails to extend his term and is forced to retire in Episode 28 although given that he is seen in Episode 30 addressing the public about the successful arrests of the triad leaders, he may have been reinstated afterwards.

=== Minor characters ===
- Keith Ng as Sha Jin (沙展). A policeman and a subordinate to both Szeto Shun and Racheal Koo. Member of OCTB.
- Alex Yung as Ah Kun (阿權). A policeman and a subordinate to both Szeto Shun and Racheal Koo. Member of OCTB.
- Moses Cheng as Dai Lik (大力). A policeman and a subordinate to both Szeto Shun and Racheal Koo. Member of OCTB.
- Keith Mok as Ah Wai (阿偉). A policeman and a subordinate to both Szeto Shun and Racheal Koo. Member of OCTB.
- Doris Chow as Meibo. A policeman and a subordinate to both Szeto Shun and Racheal Koo. Member of OCTB.
