= On-Lie Game =

2020 Hong Kong television series

- Also known as: 迷網
- Genre: Police procedural; Drama
- Written by: Cheng Sing-mo
- Directed by: Tse Ho-yeung; Sze Chun-kit; Lee Kin-wo; Leung Ting-hin
- Starring: Mat Yeung; Samantha Ko; Hera Chan; Brian Chu; Stefan Wong
- Opening theme: "Who Are You (你是誰)" by Fred Cheng
- Country of origin: Hong Kong
- Original language: Cantonese
- No. of episodes: 25

Production
- Producer: Simon Wong
- Production location: Hong Kong
- Running time: 43 minutes
- Production company: TVB

Original release
- Network: TVB Jade; myTV Super
- Release: 13 July – 14 August 2020

On-Lie Game (Chinese: 迷網; lit. 'The Web of Deception') is a Hong Kong drama series produced by TVB. The 25-episode series aired from 13 July to 14 August 2020. Starring Mat Yeung, Samantha Ko, Hera Chan, Brian Chu, and Stefan Wong, it follows officers of the Technology Crime Division as they investigate online scams, romance fraud, hacking, and financial cybercrime.

== Cast ==
- Mat Yeung as Sunny Szeto Chung, a Senior Inspector in the Technology Crime Division
- Samantha Ko as Vincy Cheung Wai, a wedding planner
- Hera Chan as Denise Siu Mei-ting, an Inspector in the Technology Crime Division
- Brian Chu as Eric Ko Chun-kit, a cyber security expert and wealthy heir
- Stefan Wong as Michael Shum Tsz-ho, a finance professional
- David Chiang as Szeto Cham, a traditional Chinese medicine physician and Sunny's father
- Helen Ma as Mok Suet-fong, a former police officer and Sunny's mother
- Lawrence Lau as Szeto Ching, a college student and Sunny's younger brother
- Lee Shing-cheong as Chau Sik-kan, the owner of a traditional Chinese medicine shop
- Strawberry Yeung as Chau Kung Mung-dip, Chau Sik-kan's wife
- Henry Yu as Siu Fu-chuen, a former school principal and Denise's father

== Plot ==
Senior Inspector Sunny Szeto of the Technology Crime Division leads a team in Hong Kong that investigates online scams, romance fraud, hacking, and financial cybercrime. He handles cases ranging from cryptocurrency schemes to online shopping fraud, while navigating personal matters involving his family and former girlfriend, Vincy Cheung.

The team's investigations uncover multiple criminal schemes, including the romance scam targeting Vincy, large-scale investment and financial fraud, and corporate corruption, revealing the syndicates responsible.

== Music ==
Track Listing
No.	Title	Lyrics	Music	Artist(s)	Length
1.	"Who Are You (你是誰)"	Sandy Cheung	Damon Chui	Fred Cheng	4:11
2.	"Heaven's Will (天意) (Instrumental)"		Alex Lau

== Ratings and reception ==
Tung Yan-ki from HK01 gave the cast's performances a mixed review, criticizing some of the lead actors' performances while generally praising the supporting cast.

Week	Episodes	Airing dates	Ratings (Note: According to Hong Kong's TV rating system, each rating point represents approximately 64,670 viewers.)		Ref.
Week	Episodes	Airing dates	Average ratings	Peak ratings	Ref.
1	1 – 5	13–17 July 2020	26.3 points	28.1 points	
2	6 – 10	20–24 July 2020	27.6 points		
3	11 – 15	27–31 July 2020	28.2 points	28.9 points	
4	16 – 20	3–7 August 2020	28.5 points	29.4 points	
5	21 – 25	10–14 August 2020	29.1 points	29.3 points	
