= Angel Chiang =

Hong Kong actress (born 1989)

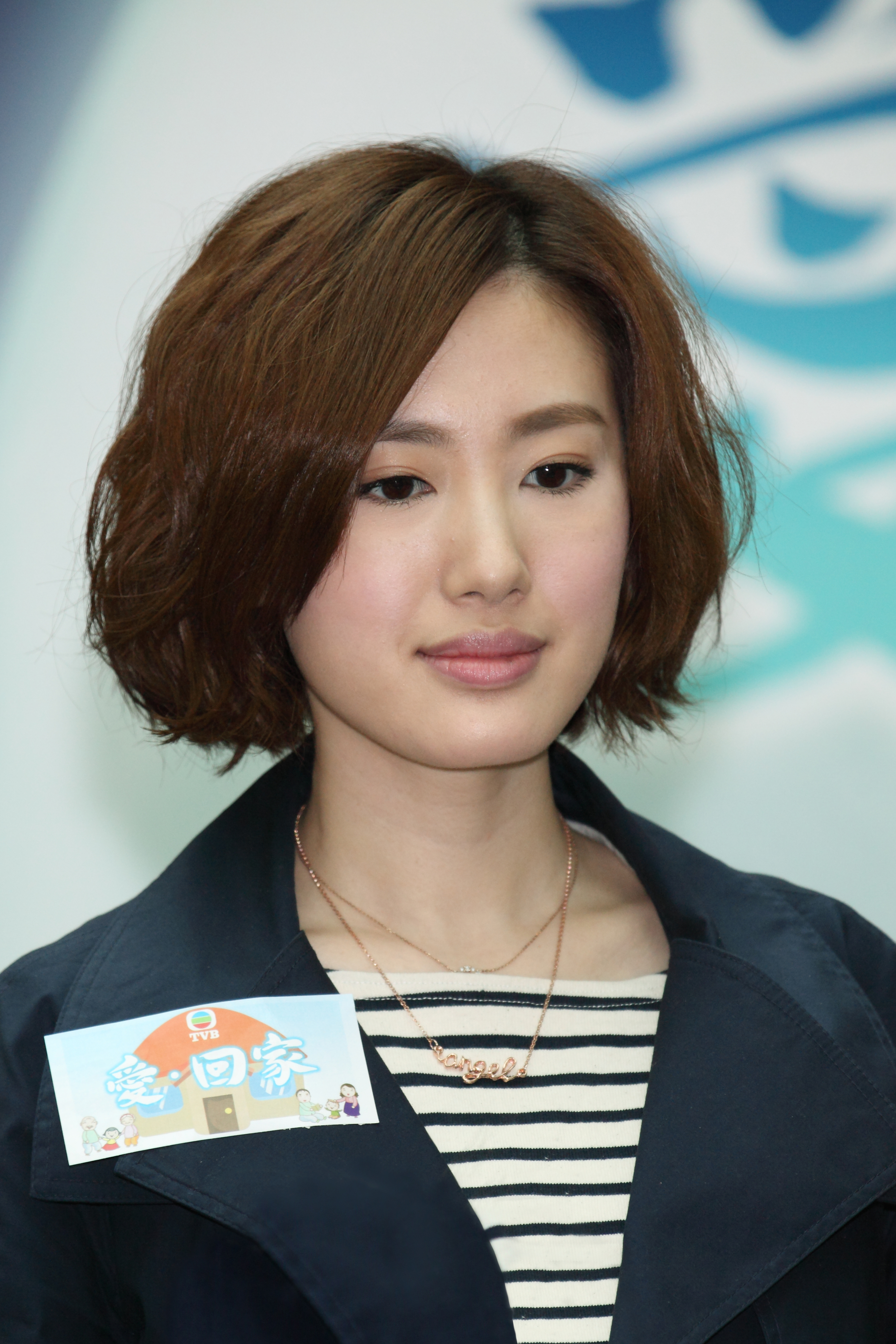
- Chiang at the premier of Come Home Love.
- Born: November 10, 1989 (age 36); Shenzhen, Guangdong
- Occupation: Actress
- Years active: 2007–present
- Notable work: Come Home Love; Al Cappuccino; The War of Beauties
- Awards: TVB Anniversary Awards – Most Improved Female Artiste; 2020 Al Cappuccino, Legal Mavericks 2020, Hong Kong Love Stories; Best Supporting Actress; 2022 The War of Beauties

Chinese name
- Traditional Chinese: 蔣家旻
- Simplified Chinese: 蒋家旻
Transcriptions
Standard Mandarin
- Hanyu Pinyin: Jiǎng Jiāmín
Yue: Cantonese
- Jyutping: Zoeng2 Gaa1 Man4

Angel Chiang (Chinese: 蔣家旻; born November 10, 1989) is a Hong Kong actress contracted to TVB.

== Career ==
Angel Chiang went to school at Yan Chai Hospital Lim Por Yen Secondary School. In 2007, she became a TVB artiste after entering the TVbeople talent competition, being the only female artiste of the eight to be given artiste contracts by TVB. Since joining TVB, Chiang has played many supporting roles and being cast in five series as the younger versions of older established TVB actresses. The most prominent of these roles was as the young Yip Chi Yan in the 2011 drama When Heaven Burns.

Chiang received her first major role in the 2012 sitcom Come Home Love. In 2013, she took on her first female leading role in the film A Secret Between Us. Chiang garnered attention with her role in the 2020 comedy drama Al Cappuccino. She gained recognition by winning the Most Improved Female Artiste award at the 2020 TVB Anniversary Awards. In 2022, she received attention again with her villainous role in the drama The Beauty of War. , eventually winning the TVB Anniversary Award for Best Supporting Actress.

Chiang is best friend with Tracy Chu, Roxanne Tong, Jennifer Shum and Kayi Cheung.

== Filmography ==
=== TV dramas ===
Year	Title	Role	Notes
2007	Best Selling Secrets	Secretary, Reporter	Ep. 310, 317
2007	Colours of Love	Angel, Ho Man's friend	Ep. 3, 6
2008	Love Exchange	Fong Cheuk-ying	Supporting Role
2008	Your Class or Mine	Model	Cameo
2008	Moonlight Resonance	Christine	Cameo
2008	When Easterly Showers Fall On The Sunny West	Ho Sui-kam (young)	Cameo
2008	Off Pedder	Paparazzi	Ep. 6
2008	Pages of Treasures	Stephy Sze Ying-ying	Sammi's friend
2009	E.U.	A girl that overdoses	Ep. 27
2009	Rosy Business	Hong Po-kei (young)	Younger version of Sheren Tang’s character
2009	Just Love II	Court staff	Cameo
2009	Burning Flame III	Model shop staff	Cameo
2009	Beyond the Realm of Conscience	Lau Yeuk-sze	Supporting Role
2010	My Better Half	Pharmacy staff	Cameo
2010	A Fistful of Stances	Wing Tsz-yau	Supporting Role
2010	Fly With Me	Bride's friend	Cameo
2010	The Mysteries of Love	Ida	One of Professor King's student (Ep. 2–3, 9, 15–16, 25)
2010	When Lanes Merge	Ngai Shan-shan	Supporting Role
2010	No Regrets	Mui Lan-heung (young)	Cameo
2010	Gun Metal Grey	Model	Cameo
2010	Some Day	Coco	Cameo
2011	Links to Temptation	Daughter	Cameo
2011	The Rippling Blossom	Reporter	Cameo
2011	Relic of an Emissary	Siu Lai	Cameo
2011	Yes, Sir. Sorry, Sir!	Yumi Lam Lai-heung	Supporting Role; Student at the high school
2011	Be Home for Dinner	Sum Pui-yee (young)	
2011	The Other Truth	Bobo	Ep.8-10
2011	The Life and Times of a Sentinel	Ho Yee	Cameo
2011	Forensic Heroes III	Apple Yan Tsz-yu	Ep. 9
2011-2012	When Heaven Burns	Hazel Yip Tsz-yan (young)	Younger version of Charmaine Sheh’s character
2012	The Hippocratic Crush	Patient	Cameo
2012	Daddy Good Deeds	Pui Yee	Cameo
2012	Gloves Come Off	Poor youth	Ep. 11–12
2012	Come Home Love	Tracy Ma Tsz-nei	Main Role
2012	Witness Insecurity	Ying	Ep. 2, 4, 7, 9, 11
2012	Tiger Cubs	Fung Tsz-ching	Cameo
2012	Witness Insecurity	Ah Ying	Cameo; Jojo's friend
2012	Three Kingdoms RPG	Suet Ngan	Cameo
2012	King Maker (TV series)	Wai Lan	Hung-ying's personal attendant (Introduced in Ep.06)
2012	The Confidant	Tsang Siu-cha	Ep. 7
2013	Beauty at War	Tsz Kuen	Cameo
2013	Awfully Lawful	Tsz Lau-lan (young)	Younger version of Law Lan’s character
2015	Come Home Love (series 2)	Tracy Ma Tsz-nei	Guest Appearance
2016	K9 Cop	Fanny Lai Suk-fan	Major Supporting Role
2016	ICAC Investigators 2016	Ann Mak Hei-man	Supporting Role
2017	Legal Mavericks	Suki Ho Shuk-kei	Ep. 3-7
2017	Nothing Special Force	Man Yau-yau	Ep. 18-20
2017	My Ages Apart	Yeung Tsz-wai	Supporting Role
2018	Apple-colada	Chan Kit-fong	Supporting Role
2019	Our Unwinding Ethos	Emily Ku Pan-sin	Major Supporting Role
2020	Al Cappuccino	Yiu Ching-shui	Major Supporting Role; TVB Anniversary Award for Most Improved Female Artiste
2020	Hong Kong Love Stories	Mok Siu-ha (young)	Younger version of Mimi Keung’s character TVB Anniversary Award for Most Improved Female Artiste
2020	Legal Mavericks 2020	Suki Ho Shuk-kei	Guest Appearance in Ep. 22; TVB Anniversary Award for Most Improved Female Artiste
2021	Final Destiny	Ching Yuk-ping	Major Supporting Role
2021	Fraudstars	Lee Sa-sa	Main Role
2021	Take Two	Alice Au-yeung Ka-shun	Major Supporting Role
2021	Flying Tiger 3	Hui Yeuk-hung	Guest Appearance
2022	Stranger Anniversary	Skylar Kam Ka-ling	Major Supporting Role
2022	The Beauty of War	Chung Ka-kei / Katy Chau Ka-kei	Major Supporting Role; TVB Anniversary Award for Best Supporting Actress
2022-present	Come Home Love: Lo And Behold	"Gaga" Chin Chai	Guest appearance in Ep. 1665–1666, 1676
Filming	非常檢控觀	Pong Sin-yuk	Supporting Role

=== Films ===
- I Love Hong Kong (2011)
- The Fortune Buddies (2011)
- A Secret Between Us (2013)
- The Best Plan is No Plan (2013)
