= Battle of the Seven Sisters =

2021 Hong Kong television series

- Also known as: 七公主
- Genre: Drama; Family; Romance; Comedy
- Written by: Cheng Shing-mo
- Directed by: Joe Chan Wai-kwun; Chung Kwok-keung; Wong Chi-wah; Chan Ping; Ho Lok-yin
- Starring: Priscilla Wong; Rosina Lam; Samantha Ko; Kaman Kong; Judy Kwong
- Opening theme: "You Me Her (你我她)" by Kayee Tam
- Country of origin: Hong Kong
- Original language: Cantonese
- No. of episodes: 26

Production
- Producer: Joe Chan Wai-kwun
- Production location: Hong Kong
- Running time: 43 minutes
- Production company: TVB

Original release
- Network: TVB Jade; myTV Super
- Release: 9 August – 11 September 2021

Battle of the Seven Sisters (Chinese: 七公主; lit. 'Seven Princesses') is a Hong Kong drama television series produced by TVB and overseen by producer Joe Chan. The 26-episode series aired from 9 August to 11 September 2021 and follows the Koo family siblings as they confront legal disputes, family secrets, and personal struggles, exploring themes of growth, grief, and reconciliation. The principal cast includes Priscilla Wong, Rosina Lam, Samantha Ko, Kaman Kong, and Judy Kwong. Inspired by the spirit of Journey to the West, the series won Best Series at the 54th TVB Anniversary Awards, while Rosina Lam received Best Actress.

== Cast ==
- Priscilla Wong as Alison Koo Ling-shan, the eldest sister and a successful but cold, high-flying barrister whose thriving career contrasts with her troubled personal life and strained relationship with her siblings. To ensure a realistic portrayal, Wong analyzed courtroom documentaries as part of her character research.
- Rosina Lam as Grace Koo Yu-yin, the third half-sister and manager of a co-working space who struggles to cope with the death of her husband.
- Samantha Ko as Koo Ching-tung, the second sister, a laid-back yet rough-around-the-edges woman who works as an Uber driver and online writer.
- Kaman Kong as Hailey Koo Sheung-yi, the fourth sister and a piano teacher who secretly faked her qualifications and struggles with personal insecurities.
- Jeannie Chan as Moon Chiu Kwan-yuet, one of the younger sisters connected to the Koo family through complex family ties.
- Judy Kwong as Jasmine Fong Chor-yu, a trainee solicitor and fencing enthusiast secretly supported by the Koo family patriarch despite no biological relation. Kwong underwent a few months of fencing training to prepare for the role.
- Karl Ting as Sung Wan-kei / Koo Siu-po, the youngest half-brother of the Koo family who returns from South Korea.
- Lau Dan as Koo Pak-fong, the father of the Koo siblings who leaves a series of missions for his daughters to complete after his death in order to inherit his fortune.
- Helen Ma as Shirley Kung Lai, Koo Pak-fong's ex-wife and the mother of Alison, Ching-tung, and Hailey.
- Hera Chan as Wu Ying-suet, a rape victim represented by Alison in the early episodes who later reappears as a visual hallucination during Alison's stress-induced psychosis and familial guilt.
- Moon Lau as Maya Chuk Mei-nga, Sung Wan-kei's childhood friend from South Korea.
- Gilbert Lam as Matthew Szeto But, a solicitor and Jasmine's mentor who executes Koo Pak-fong's will following his death.
- Joel Chan as Duncan Yip Chi-lai, Alison's university classmate with whom she has an affair.
- Felix Ng as Aden Cheung Man-ho, a physiotherapist and former student of Alison's who develops a crush on her.
- Yen To as Alfred Ching Siu, Alison's mentor.
- Leo Lee as Roy Lee Long, Alison's mentee.
- Tsui Wing as Tsui Ming-hin (deceased) / Gordon Wong Nam, Grace's late husband; she later meets Wong Nam, a man who closely resembles him.
- Timothy Cheng as Philip Shum Chiu-yin, Grace's supervisor who secretly has a crush on her and is also an expert in fencing.
- Luk Wing as Hanson Ma Kei-chun, an aspiring comic book artist who befriends Ching-tung.
- Sunny Dai as Ng Fei-lung, Ching-tung's friend.

== Themes and production ==
Battle of the Seven Sisters was produced by Joe Chan Wai-kwun and script supervised by Cheng Shing-mo, with direction handled by Chan and a rotating team. According to Chan, the series' thematic framework was inspired by the classical novel Journey to the West; he emphasized that the narrative focuses on personal growth and emotional experience throughout a journey rather than the eventual outcome. The drama explores the intertwined lives of seven women from diverse backgrounds, focusing on themes of self-discovery and the reciprocal influence of their relationships on individual development. Despite the series title's reference to seven sisters, the seventh member of the core family group is the younger half-brother, portrayed by Karl Ting.

== Plot ==
Battle of the Seven Sisters follows the intertwined lives of several siblings who face legal, familial, and emotional conflicts. The story centers on Alison Koo (Priscilla Wong), a successful but emotionally distant barrister who is highly focused on winning court cases. In pursuit of victory, she sometimes employs aggressive or ethically questionable strategies in litigation. Alison maintains a secret romantic relationship with a married man while dealing with her strained relationship with her family, particularly her sisters. After receiving news of her father's death, she becomes involved in a mission he left behind, which includes searching for a missing half-sister.

Koo Ching-tung (Samantha Ko) becomes involved in inheritance-related arrangements and approaches Grace Koo (Rosina Lam) under complex circumstances. Grace struggles with grief over her deceased husband while developing an emotional attachment to a man who resembles him. The series also portrays the personal struggles of other characters.

Throughout the story, the characters confront various legal disputes while coping with loneliness, mental health challenges, family estrangement, and personal losses. As hidden secrets are gradually revealed, the siblings seek reconciliation with one another and attempt to move forward toward new beginnings.

== Music ==
Track Listing
No.	Title	Lyrics	Music	Artist(s)	Length
1.	"You Me Her (你我她)"	Sandy Cheung	Damon Chui	Kayee Tam	2:57
2.	"How Do You Let Go of Love? (該如何放棄愛)"	Tsang Chui-yu	Tsang Chui-yu	Vivian Koo	3:55

== Ratings and reception ==
Week	Episodes	Airing dates	Ratings (Note: According to Hong Kong's TV rating system, each rating point represents approximately 64,670 viewers.)	Ref.
1	1 – 5	9–13 August 2021	20 points	
2	6 – 10	16–20 August 2021	20.8 points	
3	11 – 15	23–27 August 2021	21 points	
4	16 – 20	30 August – 3 September 2021	21.9 points	
5	21 – 26	6–11 September 2021	21.4 points	

== Awards and nominations ==
Rosina Lam's Best Actress win was described by the media as controversial, with some netizens expressing that they felt she was not the strongest contender for the award.

Year	Award	Category	Nominated work	Results	Ref.
2021	54th TVB Anniversary Awards	Best Television Series	Battle of the Seven Sisters	Won	
2021	54th TVB Anniversary Awards	Best Actress	Rosina Lam	Won	
