= Legal Mavericks 2020 =

Hong Kong television series

- 踩過界II / 盲俠大律師2020
- Genre: Legal; Crime; Detective
- Created by: Lam Chi-wah
- Written by: Wong Wai-keung; Fung Yat-chun; Chung Yeuk-sze
- Directed by: Chin Wing-chi; Leung Kai-ching; Yiu Tin-tong; Wong Ho-fai
- Starring: Vincent Wong; Owen Cheung; Sisley Choi; Kelly Cheung; Paul Chun; Lesley Chiang; Jessica Kan; Chun Wong; Hugo Wong; Cheung Kwok-keung
- Country of origin: Hong Kong
- Original languages: Cantonese (TVB Jade and iQiyi); Mandarin (iQiyi only)
- No. of episodes: 28

Production
- Producer: Lam Chi-wah
- Running time: 45 minutes
- Production company: TVB

Original release
- Network: TVB Jade, iQiyi

Related
- Legal Mavericks

Legal Mavericks 2020
- Traditional Chinese: 踩過界II
- Simplified Chinese: 踩过界II
Transcriptions

Alternative Chinese name
- Traditional Chinese: 盲俠大律師2020
- Simplified Chinese: 盲侠大律师2020
Transcriptions

Legal Mavericks 2020 (Chinese: 踩過界II), also known as Legal Mavericks 2, is a legal, crime, detective television drama produced by TVB. It serves as the second season to 2017's Legal Mavericks and stars Vincent Wong, Owen Cheung, Sisley Choi, Kelly Cheung and Paul Chun. Lam Chi-wah serves as the producer.

== Cast and characters ==
=== Main characters ===
- Vincent Wong as Hope Man San Hap (文申俠), a blind lawyer who strives for justice for the disadvantaged, using his other heightened senses and legally controversial methods to seek truths behind his court cases.
- Owen Cheung as Santiago "Gogo" Kuk Yat Ha (谷一夏), an ex-policeman turned private investigator and Hope's housemate.
- Sisley Choi as Deanie "Dino" Chiu Ching Mui (趙正妹), a legal executive working for Hope, who has a heroic spirit due to her mafia family background. In addition to being a law clerk, she also owns a bar called Pledge. Later became a Barrister and James' disciple.
- Kelly Cheung as Eva Shaw Mei Na (邵美娜), a competitive lawyer.
- Paul Chun as James Kan Siu Wang (簡紹宏), a Senior Counsel and Queen's Counsel, Eva's master and Hope's former master.

=== Notable Characters ===
- Lesley Chiang as Kong Bo Chai (江寶釵), nicknamed "Chai" by Gogo. An Inspector of Police of the Regional Crime Unit. She was Gogo’s ex-girlfriend when he was still in the force.
- Jessica Kan as Jasmine Kwok Lam (郭琳), a pupil lawyer and disciple of Hope.
- Chun Wong as Chiu Cheung Fung (趙翔鳳), Dino’s father.
- Hugo Wong as Walter Wah Chun Ngok (華鎮岳), a Senior Prosecutor of the Department of Justice.
- Cheung Kwok-keung as Fok Ting Pong (霍定邦), the Secretary of Justice.
