= Kelly Fu =

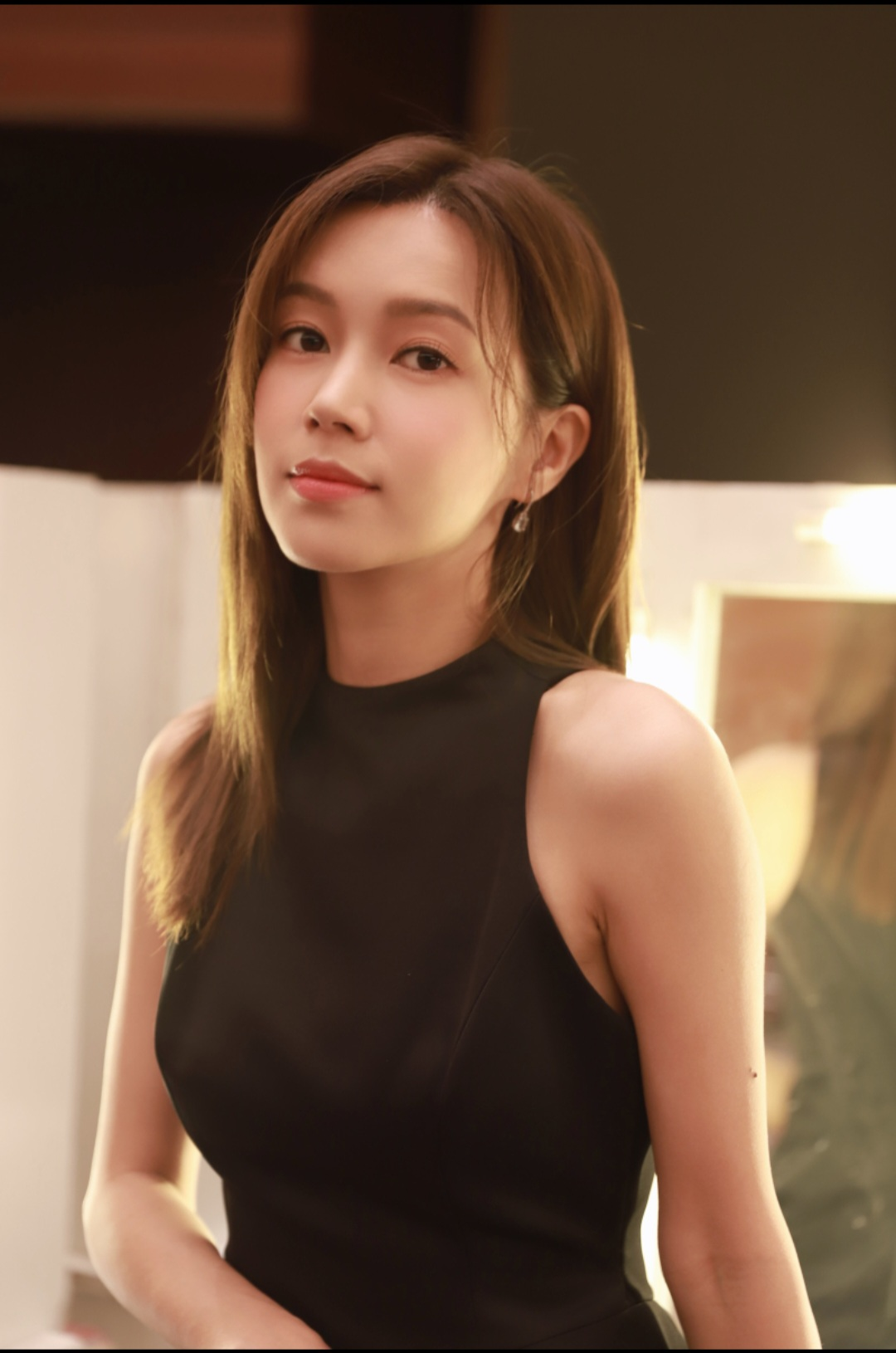
- Fu in 2023
- Born: 6 January 1985 (age 41); British Hong Kong
- Occupations: Actress; model
- Years active: 2003–present
- Awards: TVB Anniversary Awards – Best Supporting Actress; 2024 No Room For Crime
- Musical career
- Origin: Hong Kong
- Label: TVB

Kelly Fu Ka Lei (Chinese: 傅嘉莉; born 6 January 1985) is a Hong Kong-German actress and model. She is currently managed under the Television Broadcasts Limited (TVB).

== Career ==
=== 2003–06: Career beginning ===
Following her success during the first half of 2003 for her role in her debut TVB drama Hearts of Fencing, Fu played Tsui Kam-mui, the school's campus belle with a train of boys desperate for a chance to date her. In the latter half of the year, she had a supporting role in the box-office success film, Infernal Affairs II. She played May, the girlfriend of the character Chan Wing-yan, who was portrayed by Shawn Yue.

In 2004 and 2005, Fu had supporting roles in the TVB dramas Sunshine Heartbeat and The Great Adventure. After The Great Adventure, Fu took a break from filming TVB dramas, to instead focus on modeling and her film career.

=== 2007–12: Budding film career ===
In 2007, Fu played So Tsz-kei in The Haunted School. She starred opposite popular Hong Kong actors Chui Tien-you and Theresa Fu. In 2011, she starred in the film Love Is the Only Answer opposite her TVB colleagues, including Charmaine Sheh, Alex Fong and Him Law. In 2012, Fu played Cindy in the film Fairy Tale Killer, starring opposite Sean Lau and Wang Baoqiang.

=== 2013–present: Gaining recognition ===
In the popular TVB drama sequel to the hit 2003 drama, Triumph in the Skies II (2013), Fu played Josie, a waitress at the airport's cafe, who was the love interest of Ron Ng’s character. This coupling caused a media frenzy in Hong Kong as netizens speculated that they were dating each other in real life. Alongside fellow TVB actress Rebecca Zhu, Fu was chosen by the media as TVB's "Next-Gen Fadans."

In 2014, Fu had a supporting role in the film, Iceman, starring opposite Donnie Yen.

In the 2015 TVB drama Captain of Destiny, Fu played Ha-sim, an imperial maid who served Ruco Chan’s character. She gained recognition by earning her first Best Supporting Actress nomination at the 2015 TVB Anniversary Awards.

In 2017, Fu starred in three TVB dramas. She took on her first female leading role in the comedy drama May Fortune Smile on You, starring opposite Wayne Lai. Fu had expressed that she felt very nervous when she first filmed with Lai, due to his current status as one of TVB's most well-respected actors, as well as her first time starring as female lead. In the drama Burning Hands, Fu played Dawn. With this role, she garnered her first nominations for My Favourite TVB Supporting Actress at the 2017 StarHub TVB Awards and Favourite Top 15 TVB Drama Characters at the 2017 TVB Star Awards Malaysia. In the drama Married But Available, Fu played Kay. This role earned her second nomination for Best Supporting Actress at the 2017 TVB Anniversary Awards.

In 2018, Fu starred as the second female lead in the TVB drama The Stunt, in which she played Chun Chun, an actress. This role garnered her first nominations for Favourite TVB Actress in both Singapore and Malaysia at the 2018 TVB Anniversary Awards.

In the 2020 comedy drama Al Cappuccino, Fu played Mandy, the second younger sister of Vincent Wong’s character. She earned her third nomination for Best Supporting Actress at the 2020 TVB Anniversary Awards.

== Personal life ==
On 15 July 2018, Fu launched her own brand, Faa, which specializes in hand-made bridal headbands.

== Filmography ==
=== TV dramas ===
==== TVB ====
Year	Title	Role	Notes
2003	Hearts of Fencing	Tsui Kam-mui	Supporting Role
2004	Sunshine Heartbeat	Tsui Kam-mui	Supporting Role
2013	Triumph in the Skies II	Josie Kiu Cho-sze	Supporting Role
2014	Swipe Tap Love	Diana Jiao-fei	Major Supporting Role
2015	Captain of Destiny	Ha Sim	Major Supporting Role
2016	ICAC Investigators 2016	Ching Pui-shan	Supporting Role
2017	May Fortune Smile on You	Lin Tsz-yong	Main Role
2017	Burning Hands	Dawn Fok Hei-yan	Major Supporting Role
2017	Married but Available	Kay Kei Man-yee	Major Supporting Role
2018	The Stunt	Chun Chun	Main Role
2019	Justice Bao: The First Year	Tong Hiu-san	Major Supporting Role
2020	The Dripping Sauce	Carrie Lee Ka-yiu	Ep. 24-30
2020	Al Cappuccino	Mandy Chiang Chin-yu	Major Supporting Role
2021	Murder Diary	Mok Hei-yan / Mok Hei-yu	Supporting Role
2021	The Kwoks and Whats	Erica Fan Man-yi	Supporting Role
2022	Ghost Cleansing Ltd	Yanny Ching Tsz-yan	Main Role
2022	Forensic Heroes V	Yoyo Wan Yiu	Supporting Role
2023	Night Beauties	Paula Yiu So-bor	Major Supporting Role
TBA	OPM	Irene	Supporting Role
TBA	香港人在北京		Major Supporting Role
Filming	神耆小子	Chin Yau-fong	Major Supporting Role

==== Shaw Brothers pictures ====
Year	Title	Role	Notes
2021	Flying Tiger 3	JJ	Supporting Role
2022–2023	Mission Run	Wan Choi-sze	Supporting Role

=== Films ===
Year	Title	Role	Notes
2003	Infernal Affairs II	Mary (young version)	Supporting Role
2007	The Haunted School	So Tsz-kei	Supporting Role
2011	Love Is the Only Answer	Man Lai	Supporting Role
2012	Fairy Tale Killer	Cindy	Supporting Role
2014	Iceman	Female Officer	Supporting Role

== Discography ==
Discography
Year	Title	Album
2017	"財神駕到" (Here Comes the Fortune) with Wayne Lai, Amy Fan, Pal Sinn, and Matthew Ho	May Fortune Smile on You 財神駕到

== Awards and nominations ==
Year	Award	Category	Work	Result
2015	TVB Anniversary Awards	Best Supporting Actress	Captain of Destiny	Nominated
2017	StarHub TVB Awards	My Favourite TVB Supporting Actress	Burning Hands	Nominated
2017	TVB Star Awards Malaysia	Top 15 Favourite TVB Drama Characters	Burning Hands	Nominated
2017	TVB Anniversary Awards	Best Supporting Actress	Married But Available	Nominated
2017	TVB Anniversary Awards	Most Popular Drama Theme Song (shared with Wayne Lai, Pal Sinn, Amy Fan, and Matthew Ho)	May Fortune Smile on You	Nominated
2018	TVB Anniversary Awards	Favourite TVB Actress in Singapore	The Stunt	Nominated
2018	TVB Anniversary Awards	Favourite TVB Actress in Malaysia	The Stunt	Nominated
2020	TVB Anniversary Awards	Best Supporting Actress	Al Cappuccino	Nominated
2022	TVB Anniversary Awards	Best Actress	Ghost Cleansing Ltd	Nominated
2022	TVB Anniversary Awards	Most Popular Female Character	Ghost Cleansing Ltd	Nominated
2022	TVB Anniversary Awards	Favourite TVB Actress in Malaysia	Ghost Cleansing Ltd	Nominated
