= Gilbert Lam =

Hong Kong actor

Gilbert Lam Wai Sun
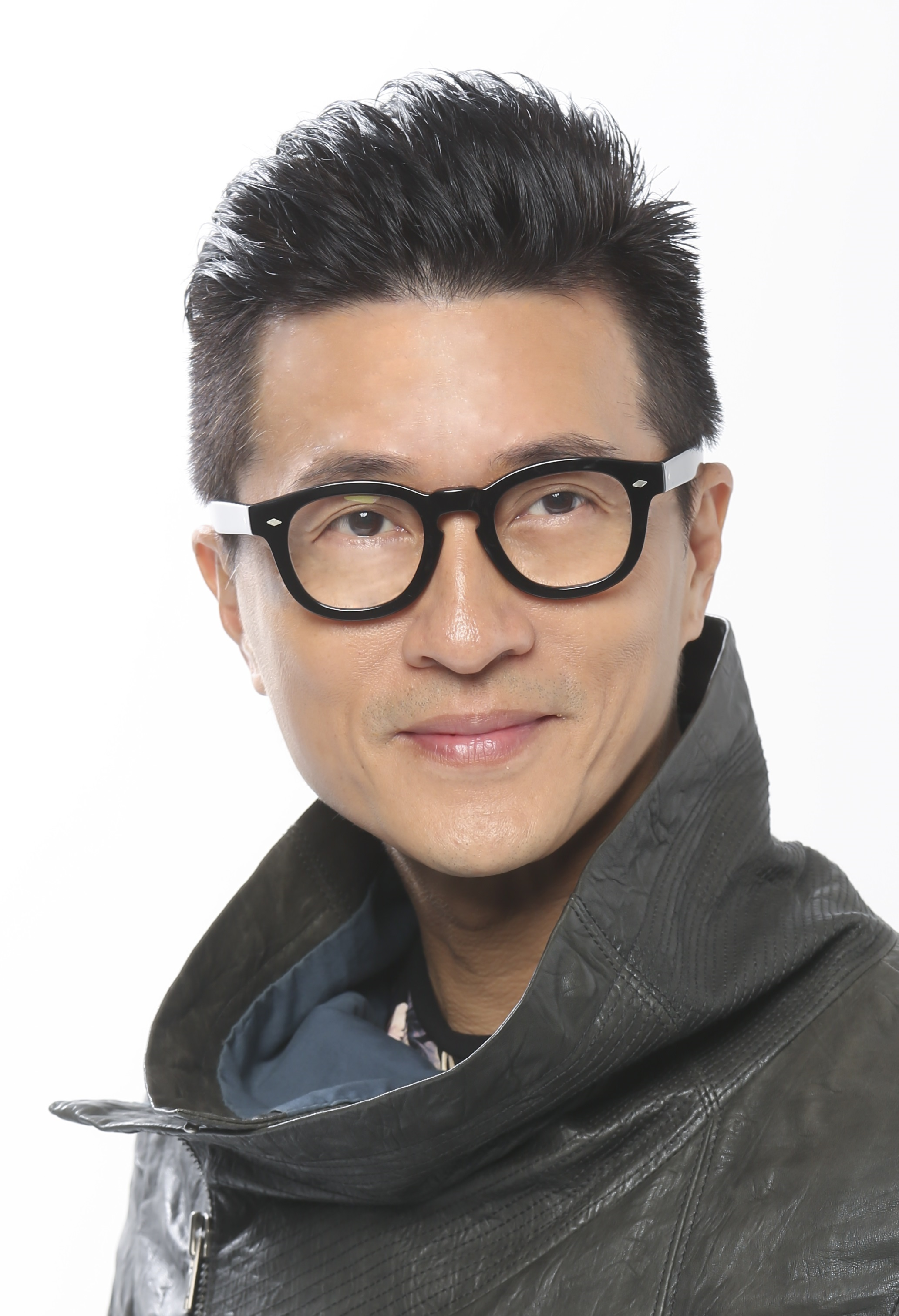
- Lam in December 2017
- Born: Lam Wai San; 6 July 1962 (age 64); Hong Kong
- Occupation: Actor
- Years active: 1985–present
- Spouse: Ivy Lin (m. 1989–2006)
- Partner(s): Lu Jingjing (2008–2011); Cindy Lee (2011–present)
- Children: Peony Lam

Chinese name
- Traditional Chinese: 林韋辰
- Simplified Chinese: 林韦辰
Transcriptions
Standard Mandarin
- Hanyu Pinyin: lín wéi chén
Yue: Cantonese
- Jyutping: lam2 wai2 saan2

Gilbert Lam Wai San (born 6 July 1962) is a Hong Kong actor formerly with TVB and ATV.

== Career ==
Gilbert Lam joined TVB's actor training course in 1985, but failed to gain an artist contract with TVB. In 1990 he went to Malaysia, appearing in some TV dramas, and became popular in Malaysia. In 1995 he returned to Hong Kong and joined ATV. He became well known for his roles in several ATV dramas, including The Good Old Days (1996), Interpol (1997) and The Mad Phoenix (1999).

Lam joined TVB in 2001, but was unable to land leading roles; in 2004 he returned to ATV. When ATV stopped production of TV dramas, Lam and fellow actors no longer had a role at the station, and he was left with occasionally hosting light entertainment shows.

In 2013 he decided to leave ATV, going north to be cast in mainland Chinese productions.

== Filmography ==
Year	Title	Role
1986	The New Heaven Sword and the Dragon Sabre	Fisherman
1987	The Legend of the Book and the Sword	Ma
1987	Police Cadet 1988	Under the leadership of Chan Yan Kwan
1988	The Final Verdict	Luk Kwok Wing's Driver
1988	Flame of Fury	Kong Lung (Under the leadership of Cheung Ngai)
1988	My Father's Son	
1988	The Saga of the Lost Kingdom	
1988	Everybody's Somebody's Favourite	Ho
1988	Twilight of a Nation	Civil Corp
1988	The Master Strategist	Suen Cheuk
1989	Looking Back in Anger	Yeung Pak Cho
1989	War of the Dragon	
1989	The Justice of Life	Jimmy
1989	Everybody Loves Somebody	Bobo's Father
1989	Flying Squads	
1989	Song Bird	Doctor
1989	Trial of Life Time	
1989	Tour of Revenge	
1990	Lung Fung Restaurant	
1990	Rain in the Heart	
1990	Yuppies on the Move	
1990	Blood of Good and Evil	Under the leadership of Lam Kuen
1990	It Runs in the Family	Under the leadership of Sha Chan Biu
1990	The Cop Story	
1990	The Kung Fu Kid	
1990	In the Realms of Joy	God Er Lang
1991	A Way of Justice	The pervert who was taken back to the police station
1991	The Crime File	Biu
1991	The Breaking Point	Bun
1991	Destined to Love	Lender Financial Subordinate A
1991	Thief of Honour	Military Officer Yuen
1991	On the Edge	Lawyer
1991	Police on the Road	Private Assistant Attending to Legal 9
1992	The Greed of Man	Michael
1992	Hard Boiled	
1992	Satanic Crystals	
1992	Beverly Hills Cop	
1992	Wong Fei Hung Returns	Gambler
1992	Crime Fighters	Lawyer
1993	Hero – Beyond the Boundary of Time	Ha's Ex-boyfriend
1995	When Dreams Come True	Hau Shan Ho
1995	Midnight Lovers	
1995	House of Horror	
1995	Justice Pao	Cheung Shao Yau
1996	Truth	
1996	The Good Old Days	Fong Ho Man
1996	The Little Vagrant Lady	Yip Kwok Leung
1996	Scarred Memory	Tom Lee
1997	The Year of Chameleon	Wu Bun
1997	Interpol	Yeung Fo Bun
1997	My Brother, My Mum	Chu Man Kai
1998	The Heroine of the Yangs	
1999	Pretty Police Woman	Tong Wai Hung
1999	The Mad Phoenix	Kong Yue Mau
2002	Where the Legend Begins	Yang Xiu
2002	Burning Flame II	Tong Lai
2002	Narc	
2003	The King of Yesterday and Tomorrow	Shum Yat-lai
2003	Virtues of Harmony II	Franco Mao
2004	Angels of Mission	Yeung Siu-fung
2004	The Conqueror's Story	Chan Ping
2004	To Catch the Uncatchable	
2004	Cross Border Daddy	Tsang Yiu Gong
2005	Go! Go! Daddy	Tsang Yiu Gong
2005	Central Affairs	
2006	Greed Mask	
2006	Placebo Cure	
2006	Hong Kong Criminal Files	Mr. Cheung
2007	Doomed To Oblivion	
2009	When East Meets West	
2015	SFC in Action III	
2016	The Hiddens	Yeung Yau Wai
2016	Princess of Lanling King	Yue Man Wu
2017	Legal Mavericks	
2017	Nothing Special Force	
2019	The Ghetto-Fabulous Lady	
2020	Of Greed and Ants	
2021	Battle Of The Seven Sisters	
2021	Take Two	
2022	In the Storm	Ho Chun Hang
2022	Stories of Lion Rock Spirit	Lam Shue Fai
