= Owen Cheung =

Hong Kong actor

- 張振朗
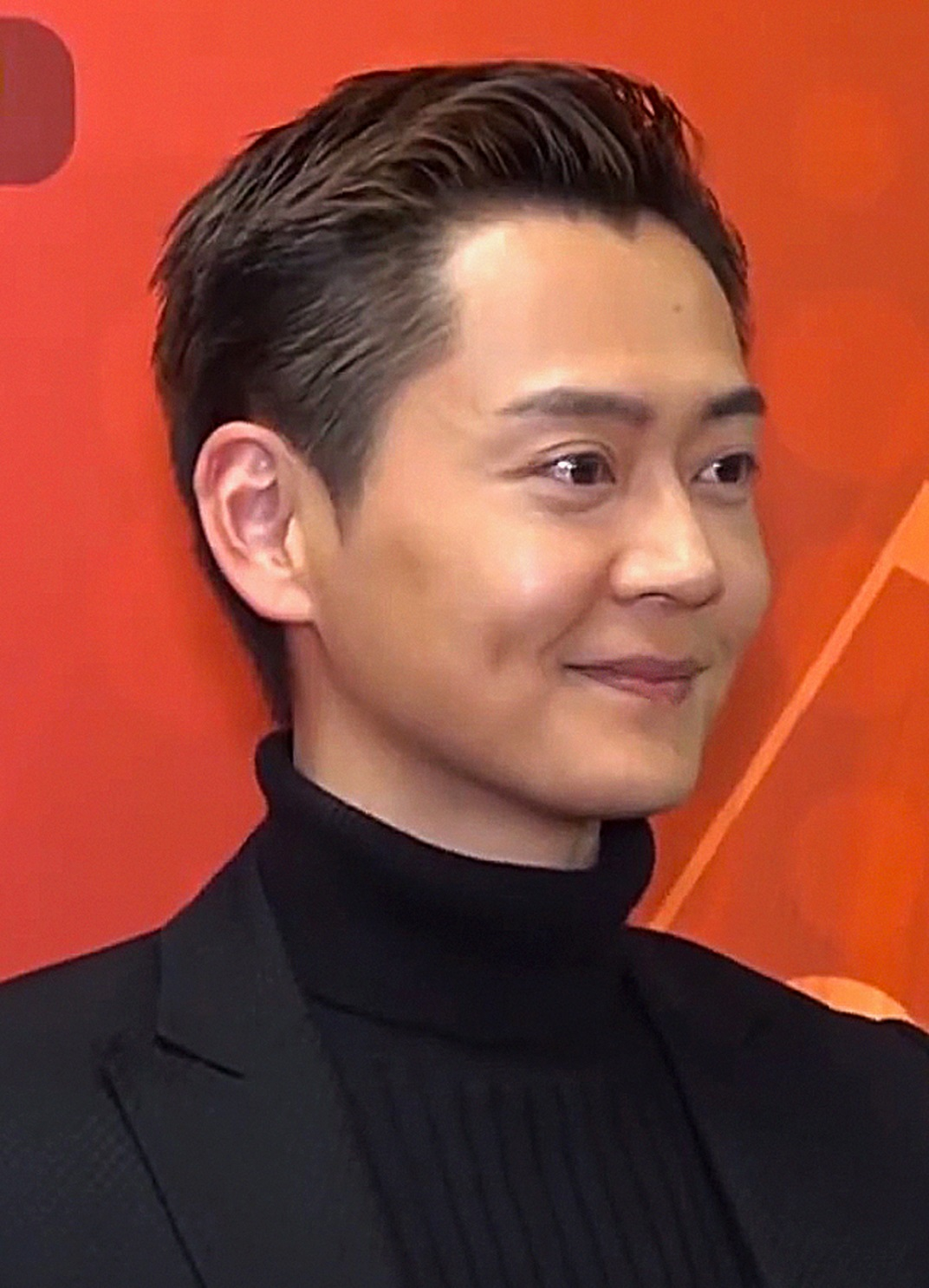
- Cheung in 2020
- Born: Cheung Chun-long; 20 July 1987 (age 39); Hong Kong
- Occupation: Actor
- Years active: 2011–present
- Notable work: Legal Mavericks series Al Cappuccino
- Partner: Renci Yeung (2019–present)
- Awards: StarHub TVB Awards – My Favourite TVB Supporting Actor; 2017 Legal Mavericks TVB Anniversary Awards – Most Improved Male Artiste; 2019 Justice Bao: The First Year, Finding Her Voice, 12 Summers; Most Popular Male Character & Most Popular Onscreen Partnership; 2020 Al Cappuccino

Chinese name
- Traditional Chinese: 張振朗
Transcriptions

Owen Cheung Chun-long (Chinese: 張振朗; born 20 July 1987) is a Hong Kong actor contracted to TVB.

Cheung is best known for his roles as Kuk Yat-ha (Gogo) in Legal Mavericks series (2017 & 2020) and Ko Ban in Al Cappuccino (2020). After winning the 2019 TVB Anniversary Award for Most Improved Male Artiste award, he won the Most Popular Male Character award at the 2020 TVB Anniversary Awards.

== Life and career ==
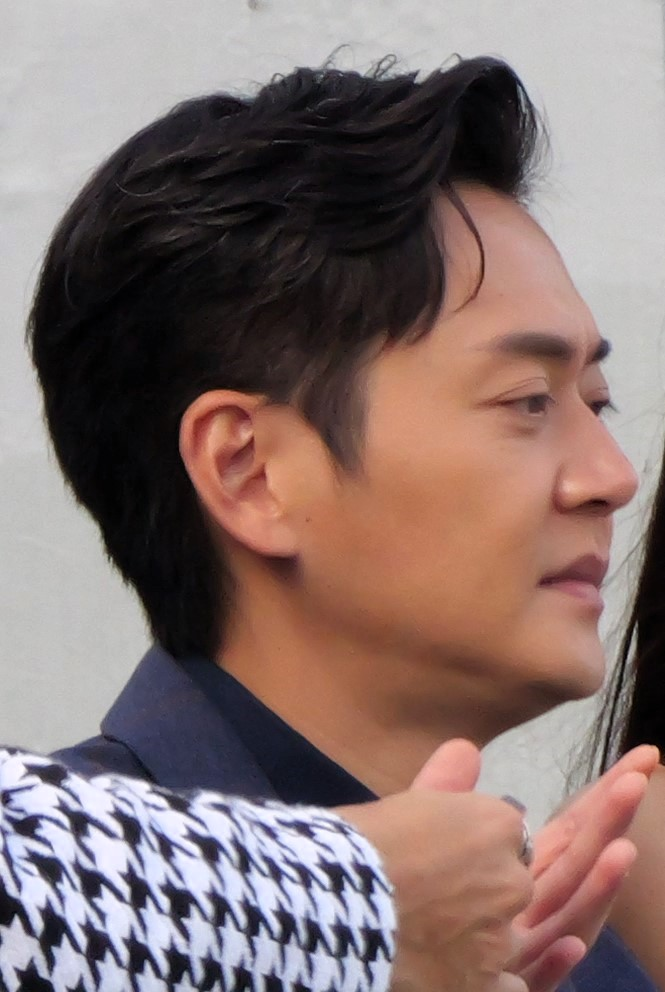
Cheung in 2024

As a graduate of the Hong Kong Design Institute, Cheung's introduction to the entertainment industry was through the New Talent Singing Awards in 2006, when he was 19 years old. In 2010, he auditioned for TVB's Artiste Training Class and high school's graduated a year later.

Cheung made his acting debut in 2012 through the sitcom Come Home Love. He had played minor roles in several television dramas. In 2014, Cheung rose to popularity after appearing on the variety show Walk The Walk, Talk The Talk, in which he impersonated Julian Cheung Chi-lam in his role as Captain Cool in the drama Triumph in the Skies II.

In 2017, Cheung gained recognition with his role as the detective "Gogo" Kut Yat-ha in the legal drama Legal Mavericks, winning My Favourite TVB Supporting Actor award at the 2017 StarHub TVB Awards. With his performance in the 2019 dramas Justice Bao: The First Year and Finding Her Voice, Cheung won the 2019 TVB Anniversary Award for Most Improved Male Artiste.

In 2020, Cheung won the Most Popular Male Character award at the 2020 TVB Anniversary Awards with his role in the comedy drama Al Cappuccino. Together with Vincent Wong Ho-shun and Brian Chu Man-hon, he also won the Most Popular Onscreen Partnership Award.

In 2021, Cheung was shortlisted for the top five for "Best Actor" and "Malaysia's Favorite TVB Actor" at the TVB Anniversary Awards Ceremony 2021 for his role as Hoi Ching-lam in the TVB anniversary drama The Ringmaster.

In 2023, Cheung played two roles in the TVB drama series Unchained Medley, playing Kook Hang-wan. His acting skills were praised by netizens. With this drama, he was shortlisted for the "Greater Bay Area's Favorite TVB Actor" and the "Best Actor" in the "Thousands of Stars Awards Ceremony 2023" final five, and the "Best TV Song" final ten. He was also shortlisted for the episode theme Like a Dream (Chinese: 似夢迷離) sung with Sherman Poon Ching-man.

In 2024, Cheung played the role of Tsui Kwok-yin in the TVB drama No Room for Crime, and his affectionate performance was well received by netizens, In the end, he won the "Best Actor" and "Malaysia's Favorite TVB Actor" awards at the "TVB Awards Presentation 2024" for this drama, becoming the double TV King.

In addition, in recent years, Cheung has been a frequent actor for TVB producers Andy Chan Yiu-chuen and Lam Chi-wah.

== Anecdote ==
On December 25, 2017, Cheung and his friend Brian Tse Tung-man were shopping when they were hit by a tent that flew down from a shopping mall and were sent to the hospital. Later, Cheung joked: "Although I have always regarded Brian Tse Tung-man as my girlfriend, I will not dare to ask him out on Christmas Day anymore, for fear that he will overpower me." In November 2019, during the rehearsal of the anniversary celebration, Cheung was hit on the shoulder by a video camera and was injured again. He had to be sent to the hospital for examination. He continued to be called the Hell's Black King by some media. In addition, the reason why netizens call Cheung the King of Hell is that he often only wins meager prizes when participating in game shows. For example, in the third series of "Do Did Eat", although Cheung and his partner won 2,200 points, he chose a country with a low exchange rate in the exchange rate game and only won HK$1.74, becoming the guest with the lowest prize money in the series.

== Personal life ==
Cheung dated former TVB artist Apple Chan for more than five years. They were both students of the 25th Artist Training Class. However, in April 2018, they both announced their breakup on social media and stressed that there was no third party involved.

In August 2019, Cheung admitted in a radio interview that he was dating actress Renci Yeung, says he loves blowing his girlfriend's hair.

== Filmography ==
=== TV dramas ===
Year	Title	Role
2012	Come Home Love	Ken Song Lai Kan
2012	No Good Either Way	Oscar
2012	Divas in Distress	Real estate agent (Episode 1)
2012	Highs and Lows	
2012	Friendly Fires	Choi Chun-lit (Episode 5)
2012	Missing You	
2013	Inbound Troubles	Hairstylist
2013	The Day of Days	Coolie
2013	Season of Love	
2013	Reality Check	Chan Man-chung
2013	Sergeant Tabloid	
2013	A Great Way to Care II	Customer (Episode 3)
2013	Bullet Brain	
2013	A Change of Heart	Chow Ka-chi (Episode 10,11)
2013	Awfully Lawful	
2013	Karma Rider	Pak Hok-yee
2013	Always and Ever	Chan Lung-man (Episode 6)
2013	Sniper Standoff	Young Lee Ho-yeung (Episode 10)
2013	Brother's Keeper	Young Chiang-yon
2013	Will Power	
2013-2014	Return of the Silver Tongue	Leung Chi
2014	Gilded Chopsticks	Yinti, the Fourteenth Imperial Prince
2014	Swipe Tap Love	Ho Chi-fung (George)
2014	ICAC Investigators 2014	Wu Wai-shing
2014	Black Heart White Soul	Disabled teen
2014	Shades of Life	Cheung Si-tim
2014	Line Walker	Fire
2014	All That Is Bitter Is Sweet	Gai Gei Jai
2014	Come Home Love	Song Lei-chan (Ken)
2015	Romantic Repertoire	Ko Man-chun (Zero)
2015	Come Home Love 2	Lun Lap-shun (Anson)
2015	Every Step You Take	Kam Sau-yuen
2017	The No No Girl	Chong Chun-wing (Wayne)
2017	Legal Mavericks	Kuk Yat-ha (Gogo)
2019	Justice Bao: The First Year	Zhan Zhao
2019	Finding Her Voice	Luk Gui-nam (Nam)
2020	Airport Strikers	Cheung King-shan (Hill)
2020	Al Cappuccino	Ko Ban / Ko Yuen
2020	Line Waker: Bull Fight	Pong Ho-yeung
2020	Legal Mavericks 2020	Kuk Yat-ha (Gogo)
2020	The Offliners	Ting Shun-hei
2021	The Ringmaster	Hoi Ching-nam
2022	Childhood In A Capsule	Jason Ting Yau-ying
2023	Unchained Medley	Ivan Ting Yat-chun / Kuk Hang-wan
2025	Anonymous Signal	

=== Film ===
Year	Title	Role
2015	Lucky Star 2015	Captain Cool

=== Music video appearances ===
- Mag Lam "樹籐" (2012)
- Jinny Ng "想起你" (2014)
