= 2016 TVB Star Awards Malaysia =

- Date: 26 November 2016
- Location: Arena of Stars

Television/radio coverage
- Network: Astro Wah Lai Toi, TVB Jade (Hong Kong) TVB Entertainment News (Hong Kong)
- Produced by: TVB Entertainment News

The 2016 TVB Star Awards Malaysia (simplified Chinese: TVB 马来西亚星光荟萃颁奖典礼2016; traditional Chinese: TVB 馬來西亞星光薈萃頒獎典禮2016), presented by TVB Entertainment News, Astro, MY FM, and MELODY FM in Malaysia, is an awards ceremony that recognises the best Hong Kong TVB television programmes that aired on Malaysia's Astro On Demand and Astro Wah Lai Toi in 2016. It was held on 26 November 2016 at Arena of Stars in Genting Highlands, Pahang, Malaysia, and was broadcast live through Malaysia's Astro Wah Lai Toi (Astro Channel 310 (HD) & 311), Hong Kong's TVB Jade (Astro Channel 326 & Hong Kong Digital Terrestrial Channel 81) and TVB Entertainment News. The ceremony was hosted by Carol Cheng, FAMA, Jarvis Chow and Ashley Chu.

The awards ceremony was officially announced on 7 October 2016, and presented 13 nomination categories. Nominees were announced on 13 October through their official website and a mobile app for Android and iOS. The Malaysian public are able to vote for their favourite stars by casting votes on the platforms. Voting period lasted from 13 October to 19 November 2016.

A Fist Within Four Walls was the night's biggest winner with eleven trophies, including Favourite TVB Drama Series, Favourite TVB Actor, and Favourite TVB Actress.

== Winners and nominees ==
=== Programs ===
My Favourite TVB Drama Series	My Favourite TVB Drama Theme Song
A Fist Within Four Walls; House of Spirits; Law dis-Order; Speed of Life; Short End of the Stick; Fashion War; Over Run Over; Blue Veins; My Dangerous Mafia Retirement Plan; Presumed Accidents; A Fist Within Four Walls; Brother's Keeper II; My Lover from the Planet Meow; Two Steps from Heaven	"Never Know You Are the Best" (从未知道你最好) from A Fist Within Four Walls – performed by Ruco Chan and Nancy Wu; "We Are All Hurt" (我们都受伤) from Angel In-the-Making – performed by Jinny Ng; "True Lovers" (最真心一对) from Over Run Over – performed by Stephanie Ho; "Intolerance" (天地不容) from Blue Veins – performed by Hubert Wu; "Pamper" (得宠) from My Lover from the Planet Meow – performed by Kristal Tin and Nancy Wu
My Favourite TVB Variety Program	My Favourite TVB Enrichment Program
Sunday Stage Fight; I Heart HK; All Work No Pay Holidays: India; Taipei High Hi; Street Sorcerers; Mr. Hong Kong 2016; Miss Hong Kong 2016; Good Cheap Eats 5; A Starry Home Coming; Kansai Raider; Chow HK Block to Block	Wellness On the Go 4; Do Did Eat; Sidewalk Scientist; Am I Healthy?; My Handy Man; All Things Girl: Malaysia Edition 2; 5 Kids and a Bloke; Not Far But Away: Cuba; Auspicious Festivals

=== Acting and hosting ===
My Favourite TVB Actor in a Leading Role	My Favourite TVB Actress in a Leading Role
Ruco Chan – A Fist Within Four Walls as Chor Au-kuen; Bobby Au-yeung – House of Spirits as Po Foon; Benjamin Yuen – A Fist Within Four Walls as Duen Ying-fung; Alex Fong Chung-sun – Law dis-Order as Kent Cheung Keung; Liu Kai-chi – Law dis-Order as KC Lau Kan-cheung; Wayne Lai – Short End of the Stick as Lee Suk-gung; Vincent Wong – Over Run Over as Kwan Ding-ming; Kevin Cheng – Blue Veins as Ying Wut-cheuk; Kent Cheng – My Dangerous Mafia Retirement Plan as Ho Kei-song; Lawrence Ng – Presumed Accidents as George Kiu Man-kit; Edwin Siu – Brother's Keeper II as Lo Wai-son; Kenneth Ma – Inspector Gourmet as "Bill Kei" Yeung Tak-kei; Moses Chan – My Lover from the Planet Meow as Garfield Sit Ting-kap; Bosco Wong – Two Steps from Heaven as Sheldon Chun Sing-hoi; Louis Cheung – Two Steps from Heaven as Tim Yau Tin-hang	Nancy Wu – A Fist Within Four Walls as Tiu Lan; Tracy Chu – Over Run Over as Sergeant Ling Sun-fung; Ali Lee – Law dis-Order as Hazel Cheuk Yee-chung; Mandy Wong – Law dis-Order as Martha Fong Ling; Kristal Tin – My Lover from the Planet Meow as Miu Miu-miu; Natalie Tong – Speed of Life as Yiu Yiu; Alice Chan – My Dangerous Mafia Retirement Plan as So Yau-lam; Eliza Sam – My Dangerous Mafia Retirement Plan as Joyce Ho Foon-sam; Sisley Choi – Presumed Accidents as Eunice Yan Yin; Maggie Shiu – Between Love & Desire as Rebecca Tsang Po-lam; Grace Chan – Brother's Keeper II as Nana Ko Yee-na; Priscilla Wong – Two Steps from Heaven as Max Ku Shing-sheung
My Favourite TVB Actor in a Supporting Role	My Favourite TVB Actress in a Supporting Role
Mat Yeung – My Dangerous Mafia Retirement Plan as Liu Shau-kay; Him Law – Fashion War as Francis Fan Gwok-bong; Philip Ng – A Fist Within Four Walls as Lung Shing-fu; Raymond Cho – Short End of the Stick as Chan Siu-fung; Power Chan – Short End of the Stick as Dan Tin; Ngo Ka-nin – The Last Healer in Forbidden City as the Guangxu Emperor; Joel Chan – Blue Veins as Ling Fung; Lai Lok-yi – Presumed Accidents as Mantus Chuk Sing-yeung; Jonathan Cheung – Presumed Accidents as Anthony Po Yue; Carlo Ng – A Fist Within Four Walls as Fung Chun-mei; Louis Yuen – Brother's Keeper II as Lung Fei; Hugo Ng – Brother's Keeper II as Ko Ting-tsau; Eddie Kwan – My Lover from the Planet Meow as Hill Ko Tin-shan	Joyce Tang – House of Spirits as Po Yan; Grace Wong – A Fist Within Four Walls as Fa Man; Moon Lau – A Fist Within Four Walls as Audrey Or Tak-li; Akina Hong – The Executioner as Consort Wan; Rosina Lam – Short End of the Stick as Kam Dai-nam; Kingdom Yuen – My Dangerous Mafia Retirement Plan as So Yau-miu; Koni Lui – House of Spirits as Fiona Yue Fa; Candice Chiu – Daddy Dearest as Carrie Ho Lok-tsi; Jade Leung – Brother's Keeper II as Shum Mei-wah; Florence Kwok – Law dis-Order as Patricia Lee Siu-wah; Vivien Yeo – My Lover from the Planet Meow as Natasha Lam Tai-sah; Katy Kung – Two Steps from Heaven as Carmen Ching Sze-yu
My Favourite TVB Most Improved Actor	My Favourite TVB Most Improved Actress
Jonathan Cheung – The Last Healer in Forbidden City, House of Spirits and A Fist Within Four Walls; Bob Cheung – Over Run Over, House of Spirits and Between Love & Desire; Matthew Ho – Brother's Keeper II and Law dis-Order; Mark Ma; Brian Chu; Brian Tse; James Ng	Moon Lau – Angel In-the-Making, Over Run Over, Blue Veins, House of Spirits, A Fist Within Four Walls and Two Steps from Heaven; Stephanie Ho – Love as a Predatory Affair; Katy Kung – Come Home Love, The Executioner and Two Steps from Heaven; Zoie Tam; Jacqueline Wong; Roxanne Tong; Toby Chan
My Favourite TVB On-Screen Couple	My Favourite TVB Host In Variety Program
Vincent Wong and Tracy Chu – Over Run Over; Ruco Chan and Nancy Wu – A Fist Within Four Walls; Benjamin Yuen and Grace Wong – A Fist Within Four Walls; Jason Chan Chi-san and Samantha Ko – Love as a Predatory Affair; Benjamin Yuen and Natalie Tong – Speed of Life; Wayne Lai and Nancy Wu – Short End of the Stick; Raymond Cho and Rosina Lam – Short End of the Stick; Bosco Wong and Linda Chung – K9 Cop; Kevin Cheng and Kay Tse – Blue Veins; Kent Cheng and Alice Chan – My Dangerous Mafia Retirement Plan; Philip Ng and Moon Lau – A Fist Within Four Walls; Edwin Siu and Grace Chan – Brother's Keeper II; Kenneth Ma and Eliza Sam – Inspector Gourmet; Moses Chan, Kristal Tin, and Nancy Wu – My Lover from the Planet Meow; Bosco Wong, Edwin Siu, and Priscilla Wong – Two Steps from Heaven	Mat Yeung and Benjamin Yuen – All Work No Pay Holidays: India; Sammy Leung and Sharon Chan – Sunday Stage Fight; Eric Tsang and stars – I Heart HK; Carol Cheng and FAMA – Do Di Eat; Maria Cordero and Luk Ho-ming – Good Cheap Eats 5; Jinny Ng, Alfred Hui, and Hubert Wu – Taipei High Hi; Sammi Cheung, Ali Lee, Kaki Leung, Mayanne Mak, Roxanne Tong, and Jacqueline Wong – Sidewalk Scientist; Nancy Sit, Eliza Sam, Steven Cheung, Bella Lam, and Nathan Ngai – My Handy Man; Bob Lam, Louis Yan, and Jinny Ng – Street Sorcerers; Helen To – Kansai Raiders; Anderson Junior and Ben Li – Chow HK Block to Block
My Favourite TVB Drama Characters	Online Most Beloved Star Award 2016
Natalie Tong as Yiu Yiu in Speed of Life; Wayne Lai as Lee Suk-gung in Short End of the Stick; Grace Chan as Yoyo Lam Mung-yiu in Blue Veins; Eliza Sam as Joyce Ho Fuen-sam in My Dangerous Mafia Retirement Plan; Sisley Choi as Eunice Yan Yin in Presumed Accidents; Bobby Au-yeung as Po Foon in House of Spirits; Joyce Tang as Po Yan in House of Spirits; Koni Lui as Fiona Yu Fa in House of Spirits; Ruco Chan as Chor Au-kuen in A Fist Within Four Walls; Nancy Wu as Tiu Lan in A Fist Within Four Walls; Benjamin Yuen as Duen Ying-fung in A Fist Within Four Walls; Grace Wong as Fa Man in A Fist Within Four Walls; Philip Ng as Lung Shing-fu in A Fist Within Four Walls; Ali Lee as Hazel Cheuk Yi-chung in Law dis-Order; Mandy Wong as Martha Fong Ning in Law dis-Order; Kristal Tin as Miu Miu-miu in My Lover from the Planet Meow	Grace Wong; Moon Lau; Sisley Choi; Philip Ng; Grace Chan; Koni Lui; Ali Lee; Jonathan Cheung; Bob Cheung
