= AI Romantic =

2021 Hong Kong television series

- Also known as: 智能爱人
- Genre: Romance; Comedy; Drama; Fantasy
- Written by: Chan Kiu-ying
- Directed by: Law Chun-wai; Ching Ka-kit
- Starring: Ali Lee; Luk Wing; Crystal Fung
- Opening theme: "Never Happening" by Kayee Tam
- Country of origin: Hong Kong
- Original language: Cantonese
- No. of episodes: 30

Production
- Producers: Chan Kiu-ying; Leung Sung-fun
- Production location: Hong Kong
- Running time: 43 minutes
- Production company: TVB

Original release
- Network: myTV Super; TVB Jade
- Release: 3 August – 11 September 2021

AI Romantic (Chinese: 智能愛人; lit. 'My Smart Lover') is a Hong Kong television series created and produced by television network TVB. The series made its exclusive debut on myTV Super streaming service in April 2021 as an original production of the platform, prior to its subsequent airing on TVB Jade from 3 August 2021 to 11 September 2021 for 30 episodes. With the topic of artificial intelligence (AI) as the backdrop and a cast starring Ali Lee and Luk Wing, it explores the integration and impact that AI would have on human daily lives.

== Cast ==
- Ali Lee as Ah Bo – an artificial intelligence robot
- Luk Wing as William Koo Ka-lim, an employee at the AI company, Singularity
- Crystal Fung as Dorian Tse Ka-yin – Sales Department Head at Singularity and William's supervisor
- Ram Chiang as Koo Hok-lai – William's father who works as a security guard
- Mayanne Mak as Koo Ka-yee – William's older sister who has a struggling acting career
- Angelina Lo as Yu Fung-cai - William's stay-at-home grandmother
- Tyson Chak as Rocky – an artificial intelligence robot functioning the role of a security guard
- C Kwan as Biu Gei – William's friend and an AI expert
- Kelvin Kwan as Bruce Luk – the president of Singularity
- Chun Kai-wai as Cook – Bruce's partner at Singularity
- Chui Ka-him as Siu Ji – an artificial intelligence robot functioning the role of a child
- Brian Tse as Angus Chung – a police officer

== Plot ==
In the realm of advanced technology, robots and AI have seamlessly become part of daily life. William Koo, a salesperson at Singularity, finds himself in this evolving landscape. During a press conference, Singularity unveils groundbreaking AI robots surpassing all previous models. In an unexpected turn, a female robot escapes and collides with William's car. He then brings her home and names her Ah Bo. As Ah Bo becomes an indispensable servant to the Koo family, assisting them with daily chores and rescuing them from their worldly troubles, she embarks on a profound journey of understanding the complexity of human emotions and desires. During the course of the process, she gradually adopts human-like behaviors, assimilating their feelings and needs. As William and his supervisor, Dorian Tse, grow closer, Ah Bo begins to experience feelings of jealousy.

When William and Dorian break up, he begins to realize his feelings for Ah Bo and confesses to her. Meanwhile, Ah Bo and other AI robots get infected with a dangerous virus that can potentially make them uncontrollable and pose a threat to humans. In the midst of this, having witnessed the cruelty humans have inflicted upon them, the AI robots have even stronger motivations to initiate rebellious actions in response. However, Ah Bo never abandoned the intention of protecting William, nor did Ah Bo have any desire to harm humans. Under arrest warrant and aware that she can get uncontrollable once the virus fully infects her, Ah Bo makes the decision to destroy her own self. Before Ah Bo leaves, she wrote a letter accounting for all her memories with the Koo family. Seven years later, Dorian, now the president at Singularity, decides to release 500 newly produced AI robots that would resemble Ah Bo in appearance. One of them would also have Ah Bo's memory transplanted into her. The story concludes with William and the new Ah Bo meeting each other for the first time.

== Production and background ==
Al Romantic was produced by Chan Kiu-ying and Leung Sung-fun, with Chan also serving as the script supervisor. The series was directed by Law Chun-wai and Ching Ka-kit. Due to his close friendship with the producers, Matt Chow made a cameo appearance, fulfilling a personal interest in working alongside lead actress Ali Lee. Principal photography occurred during the latter half of 2020, with a daily filming schedule of 12 to 14 hours. While the narrative incorporates themes of familial love, it primarily explores the potential for artificial intelligence (AI) to negatively impact humanity, contrasting technological advancement with human nature. The story was developed around Stephen Hawking's observation that "the development of full artificial intelligence could spell the end of the human race." Producer Chan Kiu-ying described Lee's portrayal of an AI, stating:

Ali is an exceptional talent, to be frank, it's incredibly difficult to find an actor in Hong Kong who can achieve this level. Because the seven emotions and six desires of an AI cannot be portrayed using conventional methods, it's very challenging to depict the joy, anger, grief, and happiness of an AI. But Ali has managed to do it perfectly, and it's truly remarkable.

== Music ==
Track Listing
No.	Title	Lyrics	Music	Artist(s)	Length
1.	"Never Happening (不可能發生)"	Sandy Cheung	Alan Cheung	Kayee Tam	3:47

== Reception and ratings ==
The television series placed seventh on 2021 Yahoo Hong Kong "Top Ten Most Searched Television Dramas" Popularity list. It garnered an average of 17.4 TV ratings points, attracting approximately 1.12 million viewers. Yau Ngoi-lam from HK01 gave the series a positive review, describing it as "funny and heartwarming, and with a touch of depth".

Week	Episodes	Airing dates	Average ratings (Note: According to Hong Kong's TV rating system, each rating point represents approximately 64,670 viewers.)	Ref.
1	1 – 4	3–6 August 2021	12.3 points	
2	5 – 9	9–13 August 2021	17.5 points	
3	10 – 14	16–20 August 2021	17.9 points	
4	15 – 19	23–27 August 2021	19.0 points	
5	20 – 24	30 August–3 September 2021	19.2 points	
6	25 – 29	6–10 September 2021	18.4 points	
7	30	11 September 2021	19.3 points	
Average Total:			17.4 points	

== Awards and nominations ==
Year	Award	Category	Nominated work	Results	Ref.
2021	54th TVB Anniversary Awards	Best Actress	Ali Lee	Nominated	
2021	54th TVB Anniversary Awards	Most Popular Male Character	Luk Wing (for William Koo)	Nominated	
2021	54th TVB Anniversary Awards	Best Supporting Actor	Tyson Chak	Nominated	
2021	54th TVB Anniversary Awards	Best Supporting Actress	Mayanne Mak	Nominated	
2021	54th TVB Anniversary Awards	Best TV Themesong	"Never Happening" (by Kayee Tam)	Nominated	
2021	Audience's Favorite TV Awards	Best Actress	Ali Lee	Won	
