= The Perfect Guy =

The Perfect Guy may refer to:

- The Perfect Guy (1998 film), a French musical
- The Perfect Guy (2015 film), an American thriller
- "The Perfect Guy" (Frasier), an episode of the American sitcom Frasier

== See also ==
- Perfect Man (disambiguation)
- Mr. Perfect (disambiguation)
