= Brother's Keeper (2013 TV series) =

2013 Hong Kong television drama

- Promo poster
- Also known as: Big Wheel
- 巨輪
- Genre: Dramatic programming
- Created by: Amy Wong
- Written by: Ng Siu-tung
- Starring: Ruco Chan; Linda Chung; Edwin Siu; Kristal Tin; Louis Yuen; Louise Lee
- Theme music composer: Yip Siu-chung; Tang Chi-wai
- Opening theme: "巨輪" (Wheel of Time) by Edwin Siu & Ruco Chan
- Country of origin: Hong Kong
- Original languages: Cantonese; Mandarin
- No. of episodes: 32

Production
- Executive producer: Catherine Tsang
- Producer: Amy Wong
- Production locations: Hong Kong, Macau
- Running time: 45 minutes
- Production company: TVB

Original release
- Network: TVB Jade, HD Jade
- Release: 23 September – 1 November 2013

Related
- Always and Ever; The Hippocratic Crush II; Brother's Keeper II (2016)

Brother's Keeper
- Traditional Chinese: 巨輪
- Simplified Chinese: 巨轮
- Literal meaning: "big wheel"
Transcriptions
Standard Mandarin
- Hanyu Pinyin: Jù Lún
Yue: Cantonese
- Yale Romanization: Geuih Lèuhn
- Jyutping: Geoi6 Leon4

Brother's Keeper (Chinese: 巨輪; lit. 'big wheel') is a Hong Kong television drama serial produced by Amy Wong and TVB. It stars Ruco Chan, Linda Chung, Edwin Siu and Kristal Tin as the main cast of the series. It premiered on 23 September 2013 on TVB Jade in Hong Kong. The final two episodes aired back-to-back on Saturday, 2 November 2013. The plot is based on the story of Koi Kei Bakery, which is also the show's main sponsor.

The serial, set between the years 1980 and 2013, depicts the moral life struggles of two half-brothers Kiu Tin-seng (Ruco Chan) and Lo Wai-son (Edwin Siu) during the late and post-colonial periods of Hong Kong and Macau. Historical events that were set against this era, including Hong Kong's 1980 Touch Base Policy, Macau's relaxed immigration laws of 1982, the 1991 goldsmith robberies, the transfer of sovereignty over Hong Kong and Macau to China in the late 1990s, the 1998 Hong Kong financial crisis, the 1999 Macanese triad wars, the 2003 Hong Kong SARS outbreak, and the 2008 Hong Kong financial recession, serves as some of the key plot vehicles that drive the changing fates of the brothers and their families.

Development for Brother's Keeper began in mid-2012. A teaser trailer was unveiled at TVB's 2013 Sales Presentation event, which was held on 8 November 2012. The trailer premiered on TVB Jade on 24 November 2012. The serial was also exhibited as one of eighteen TVB grand television drama productions at the 17th Hong Kong International Film & TV Market in March 2013.

The sequel, Brother's Keeper II, was released in 2016.

== Production ==
=== Filming ===
A costume fitting press conference was held on 19 September 2012, and principal photography began in Hong Kong in late September 2012. A camera commencement blessing ceremony was held on 17 October 2012.

Production relocated to Macau on 21 November 2012. On 19 December 2012, the crew resumed shooting in Hong Kong. The final scenes of the drama were completed on 1 February 2013. Macau's Koi Kei Bakery is a major sponsor for the serial.

== Plot ==
Brother's Keeper is a story about two brothers of the same mother but different fathers, "Sam" Kiu Tin-seng (Ruco Chan) and Lo Wai-son (Edwin Siu). Sam was born in Hong Kong, the son of Chow Yuk-mui (Louise Lee) and Kiu Sum (Lee Kwok Lun). Due to Kiu Sum refusing to marry Chow Yuk-mui, Yuk-mui decided to take Sam to Foshan, China to start anew. In Foshan, Yuk-mui got married with Lo Fu-shing (Lau Kong) and gave birth to Son a few years afterwards.

Not long after, the family of four decided to cross the border to start a new life in Hong Kong. The family of four eventually got separated with Sam ending up in Hong Kong, while Yuk-mui, Fu-shing, and Son ending up in Macau.

The two brothers lived very different lives in the course of the next 20 years. The very hardworking and ambitious Sam managed to graduate from college and became a police officer like his biological father, Kiu Sum. He has a girlfriend named Rachel Cheuk (Linda Chung) whom he is willing to do anything to fulfill her dreams of opening a fashion store. In order to achieve his goal, he seduces Fabio (Ankie Beilke) and uses her in the process. In addition, Sam also has an ambiguous relationship with a triad member named Keung Yung (Louis Cheung) who later caused Sam to end up in jail.

Son, who is very simple-minded, only wants to live a peaceful and comfortable life in Macau. He is good friends with Yiu Man-ying (Krystal Tin) and Lung Fei (Louis Yuen). In order to avoid his abusive father (Fu-shing), Son works with his mother (Yuk-mui) at a restaurant. The lives of the two brothers, Sam and Son began to change after they meet up again. The two brothers in the series will go from 20 to 50 years old. This also shows the phrase "rags to riches" as Son becomes a rich businessowner from a poor young boy.

== Cast and characters ==
=== Main cast ===
- Ruco Chan as Kiu Tin-seng (喬天生; Kiu Tinsang) — also known as Sam.

Independent, clever, and talented, Sam is a distinguished police officer for the Royal Hong Kong Police Force, taking him only five years to get promoted from the sergeant rank to the chief inspector rank. Sam is Chow Yuk-mui's eldest son, sired by Kiu Sum, who is also a Hong Kong police officer. Rejected by his biological father, Sam suffers through a tremendously difficult childhood and is emancipated by his parents at an early age. Sam is regarded as the serial's main tragic hero. Though he is innately a good-hearted person, his tragic flaws—ambition and greed—eventually leads to his downfall by the end of the story.

Brother's Keeper is Chan's sixth collaboration with producer Wong. His breakout performance in Wong's 2011 TVB legal drama The Other Truth—his third collaboration with Wong—was what led Wong to cast Chan as the lead actor for most of her newer works. Chan expressed that he has high expectations for the serial and compares its time-lapsing scope to the likes of critically successful dramas such as The Greed of Man and Vanity Fair.

- Linda Chung as Rachel Cheuk (卓靜; Ceok Zing) — Sam's girlfriend.

Rachel is the second daughter of Lau Lai-kuen, who is the second wife of the wealthy Philip Cheuk. Despite her parents' objections, Rachel insists to date Sam. With Sam's help, Rachel eventually fulfills her dream of owning her own fashion boutiques to sell her own brand designs. She was involved in love triangle with Sam and Son for more than 20 years.

Wong had been wanting to work with Chung ever since she started production on her 2012 comedy, No Good Either Way in late 2011. Chung was one of the first cast members of Brother's Keeper that was announced in mid-2012. On her role, Chung said, "The role grew up overseas, so I naturally get to speak English! I grew up in Canada as well... speaking English dialogue is a very comfortable feeling for me."

- Edwin Siu as Lo Wai-shun (羅威信; Lo Waiseon) — Sam's younger half-brother.

The younger son of Chow Yuk-mui, Shun is sole offspring of Mui's only marriage with Lo Fu-shing. Due to his father's poor business, Shun spends most of his time in the streets of Macau to handle his own peanut brittle vendor business. Resourceful, persistent, and confident, Shun's small mobile food business eventually expands to a large multi-chained bakery shop, the Pasterilia Lo Son Kei. The simple-minded Shun serves as a foil to Sam's guileful character. Shun's story from rags to riches is also inspired by the real-life story of Leong Chan-kuong, the owner of Macau's most famous bakery shop, Koi Kei

Moses Chan was originally cast for the role of Shun, which was announced simultaneously with Ruco Chan's casting in the late summer of 2012. In August 2012, approximately a month before the serial was to commence shooting in Hong Kong, Chan was reassigned to play opposite Wayne Lai in TVB's legal drama, Will Power. After Siu replaced Chan, the character of Shun was rewritten to be younger.

- Kristal Tin as Yiu Man-ying (姚文英; Jiu Manjing) — nicknamed Chang-kai Ying (棖雞英; literally "Shrewish Ying"); Son's best friend.

Peevish, boyish, but loyal, Ying is one of Shun's closest childhood friends. Ying falls in love with Shun and is a major supporter in Shun's quest to open up his multi-chain business.

- Louis Yuen as Lung Fei (龍飛; Lung Fei) — nicknamed Young Master Lung (龍少爺); Son and Ying's best friend.

Educated overseas, Lung hails from a wealthy family in Macau, and is the heir of his family business, although he prefers to work as an insurance sales agent. Despite his family business being one of the biggest rivals of Pasterilia Lo Son Kei, Fei and Son are best friends. Fei has an obvious crush on Ying, but he is supportive when Ying begins to date Son.

- Louise Lee as Chow Yuk-mui (周玉梅; jyutping: Zau Jukmui) — Sam and Shun's mother. Mui gave birth to her first-born, Kiu Tin-seng, in Hong Kong during the late 1960s. Kiu Sum, her son's policeman father, refuses to marry Mui after their son's birth, and in a blaze of anger, Mui destroys her son's Hong Kong birth certificate and moves back to her hometown in Foshan, China. There, she meets her husband, Lo Fu-shing, and gives birth to Shing's only son, Lo Wai-shun. In 1980, Mui and her family attempt to sneak across the Hong Kong borders to escape mainland China's tumultuous social unrest, but the family is separated by external forces. Mui, Shing, and Shun land in Macau, while Sam lands in Hong Kong.

=== Recurring cast ===
- Louis Cheung as Keung Yung (姜勇; Goeng Jung) — a triad leader who strikes an ambiguous friendship with Sam.
- Lau Kong as Lo Fu-shing (羅富誠; Lo Fusing) — Son's father and Mui's only husband, whom she met in Foshan. Shing owns a struggling peanut brittle shop in Macau.
- Susan Tse as Lau Lai-kuen (劉麗娟; Lau Laigyun) — Rachel's mother, the second wife of Philip Cheuk.
- Leanne Li as Emily Cheuk (卓寧; Coek Ning) — Rachel's older sister.
- Henry Yu as Philip Cheuk (卓一帆; Ceok Jatfaan) — Rachel and Emily's father.
- Becky Lee as Inspector Mandy Yeung (楊曼芝; Joeng Maanzi) — Sam's best friend.
- Ankie Beilke as Michelle Fabio — one of Sam's love interests. Ankie is attracted to Sam and attempts to seduce him. Eyeing Fabio's wealth and power, Sam eventually gives in to her seduction.
- Joseph Lee as Kiu Sum (喬森; Kiu Sam) — Sam's father, a Hong Kong police officer. Sum does not wish to acknowledge his relationship with Sam in public, which indirectly influenced Sam's decision to become a cop.
- Stephen Wong as Kiu Wai-kin (喬偉健; Kiu Waigin) — also known as Kim, Sum's second son and Sam's younger half-brother.
- Chun Wong as Yiu Han (姚亨; Jiu Hang) and Ho Yuen-tung as Yiu Ho-nam (浩男; Jiu Hounaam) — respectively Ying's father and Ying's younger brother.
- Yue Chi-ming as Lung Kwong-kam (龍廣鑫; Lung Gwonggaam) and Angelina Lo as Yuen Shuk-ngo (阮淑娥; Jyun Sukngo) — Fei's parents.
- Timothy Cheng as Chief Inspector Wong Kam-ho (王鑑豪; Wong Gaamhou) — also known as K.O. Sir, Sam's mentor and Sum's biggest rival.
- Rosanne Lui as Lee Wai-bing (李慧冰; Lei Waibing) — Sum's wife and Kim's mother.

== Reception ==
=== Critical response ===
Brother's Keeper has received generally positive reviews from critics. On Douban, the serial received a rating of 7.7 out of 10 based on over two thousand votes.

=== Ratings ===
The following is a table that includes a list of the total ratings points based on television viewership. "Viewers in millions" refers to the number of people, derived from TVB Jade ratings (including TVB HD Jade), in Hong Kong who watched the episode live. The peak number of viewers are in brackets.

#	Time slot (HKT)	Week	Episode(s)	Average points	Peaking points	Viewers (in millions)	AI	Rank	Ref.
1	Mon – Fri, 8:30 pm	23 – 27 September 2013	1 — 5	26	31	1.67 (1.99)	–	#1	
2	Mon – Fri, 8:30 pm	30 September – 4 October 2013	6 — 10	26	28	1.67 (1.80)	–	#2	
3	Mon – Fri, 8:30 pm	7 – 11 October 2013	11 — 15	26	28	1.67 (1.80)	–	#2	
4	Mon – Fri, 8:30 pm	14 – 18 October 2013	16 — 20	27	30	1.73 (1.93)	–	#1	
5	Mon – Fri, 8:30 pm	21 – 25 October 2013	21 — 25	27	30	1.73 (1.93)	–	#1	
6	Mon – Fri, 8:30 pm	26 October – 1 November 2013	26 — 30	26	29	1.67 (1.86)	–	#1	
7	Sat, 8:30 pm	2 November 2013	31 — 32	29	32	1.86 (2.05)	–	#1	

== Accolades ==
=== TVB Awards Presentation 2013 ===
Nominees	Accolades	Results
	Best Drama	Top 5
Ruco Chan	Best Actor	Top 5
Edwin Siu	Best Actor	Nominated
Linda Chung	Best Actress	Top 5
Kristal Tin	Best Actress	Won
Ruco Chan	My Favourite Male Character	Nominated
Edwin Siu	My Favourite Male Character	Nominated
Linda Chung	My Favourite Female Character	Top 5
Kristal Tin	My Favourite Female Character	Won
Lau Kong	Best Supporting Actor	Nominated
Louis Yuen	Best Supporting Actor	Nominated
Louise Lee	Best Supporting Actress	Nominated
Edwin Siu	Most Improved Male Artiste	Top 5
