= My Lover from the Planet Meow =

Hong Kong drama television series

- Official poster
- Also known as: Ghost of Relativity 2
- 來自喵喵星的妳
- Genre: Modern Drama, Comedy, Romance, Supernatural
- Created by: Hong Kong Television Broadcasts Limited
- Written by: Lam Siu-chi, Yung Sin-ying
- Directed by: Ng Koon-yue
- Starring: Moses Chan; Kristal Tin; Nancy Wu; Eddie Kwan; Pierre Ngo; Vivien Yeo; Ram Chiang; Mimi Chu; Wai Lee
- Theme music composer: Dominic Chu
- Opening theme: "Meow Meow" (喵喵) by Alvin Ng, Auston Lam, Penny Chan (ft. C Kwan, Moses Chan)
- Ending theme: "得寵" (Pamper) by Kristal Tin, Nancy Wu
- Country of origin: Hong Kong
- Original language: Cantonese
- No. of episodes: 32

Production
- Executive producer: Catherine Tsang
- Producer: Steven Tsui
- Production location: Hong Kong
- Editors: Lam Siu-chi, Yung Sin-ying
- Camera setup: Multi camera
- Running time: 45 minutes
- Production company: TVB

Original release
- Network: TVB Jade, HD Jade
- Release: 17 October – 20 November 2016

Related
- Law dis-Order; Dead Wrong; Ghost of Relativity (2015)

My Lover from the Planet Meow
- Traditional Chinese: 來自喵喵星的妳
- Simplified Chinese: 来自喵喵星的妳
- Cantonese Yale: Lòijih Mīumīusīng Dīk Néih
- Literal meaning: "You from the Planet Cat"
Transcriptions
Standard Mandarin
- Hanyu Pinyin: Láizì Miāomiāoxīng De Nǐ
- Bopomofo: ㄌㄞˊㄗˋ ㄇㄧㄠㄇㄧㄠㄒㄧㄥ ㄉㄜ˙ ㄋㄧˇ
Yue: Cantonese
- Yale Romanization: Lòijih Mīumīusīng Dīk Néih
- Jyutping: Loi4zi6 Miu1miu1sing1 Dik1 Nei5
- IPA: [lɔ̏ːy̯.tsìː míːu̯.míːu̯.séŋ ték̚ ne̬i̯]

My Lover from the Planet Meow (Chinese: 來自喵喵星的妳; Cantonese Yale: Lòijih Mīumīusīng Dīk Néih; literally "You From the Planet Cat") is a 2016 Hong Kong television romantic-comedy with a supernatural theme television drama produced by Steven Tsui for TVB, starring almost the entire main cast from TVB's 2015 highest rated drama Ghost of Relativity. It premiered on Hong Kong's TVB Jade and Malaysia's Astro On Demand on October 17, 2016 airing Monday through Sunday during its 9:30-10:30 pm timeslot and concluding November 20, 2016 with a total of 32 episodes.

== Synopsis ==
Head of Research and Development at HTDG hair technologies Garfield Sit (Moses Chan), sees a Scottish Fold kitten in the window of a pet shop tangled up in toilet paper and decides to tell the pet shop keeper. Before Garfield gets a chance to give a piece of his mind to the neglectful shop keeper he gets talked into buying the kitten which he later names Miu-miu (Kristal Tin). Mistaken as a cat burglar, Garfield meets dedicated police women Cat Chiu (Nancy Wu). During the mistaken makes up and almost being arrested Cat causes Garfield to lose Miu-miu. Feeling that it was Cat's fault that Miu-miu is missing, Cat's Superior Si Sir (Ram Chiang) orders Cat to help Garfield find Miu-miu. In the process of finding Miu-miu, Cat and Garfield gets to know each other personally and soon starts dating, get married and have a daughter together. One day Miu-miu faints and the veterinarian tells Garfield and Cat that due to old age Miu-miu will die. Miu-miu dies and her spirit goes into outer space. While in outer space Miu-miu still looks in on Garfield and his family. Unable to stand Garfield and his daughter being bullied by an obnoxious parent, Miu-miu heads back to earth and takes up a human form to work alongside Garfield and become his daughter's nanny due to Cat's greater passion for her career.

== Cast ==
=== Main cast ===
- Moses Chan as Garfield Sit Ding-gap (薛丁甲; homophone to 薛丁格, Erwin Schrödinger)

Miu-miu's former pet owner, Cat Chiu's husband. A mild mannered head of research and development at a hair technology company. He buys Miu after noticing the kitten neglected at the pet shop.

- Kristal Tin as Miu Miu-miu (苗妙妙; homophone to 喵喵喵, the yelling sound of cat)

An alien cat who returns to her home planet when she dies of old age on Earth. Garfield Sit's former pet cat. She decides to return to Earth When Garfield's young daughter wishes her back.

- Nancy Wu as Cat Chiu Yiu (焦瑤; homophone to 招搖, publicly and arrogantly)

Garfield's girlfriend and later wife. A dedicated police women whose career often overshadows her family life which often results in her neglecting her young daughter.

=== HTDG staff ===
Senior Management

- Eddie Kwan as Hill Ko Tin-san (高天山)

Garfield's boss and General Manager at HTDG. He cares more about profits then the products the company produces and is willing to release untested products to the consumers.

- Vivien Yeo as Natasha Lam Dai-sa (藍蒂莎)

Director and Consultant at HTDG. Tasked by Hill to seduce Garfield so that Garfield will release all untested products to buyers and consumers.

Research and Development

- Anthony Ho as Phillip Fei Lap (斐立)
- C-Kwan as Ivan Ngai Han (魏帆)
- Alan Wan as Duncan Dang Kan (鄧勤)

Marketing Department

- Pierre Ngo as Dylan Tsang Siu-yan (曾紹仁; homophone to 真小人, the real villain)
- Alycia Chan as Eliza Kam Ping-miu (金萍梅; homophone to classic novel 金瓶梅 Jin Ping Mei)
- Wingto Lam as Yvonne Ko Nga-din (高雅殿; homophone to 高壓電, high volt electricity)
- Christy Chan as Elaine Yam Chow-siu (任秋水; homophone to 任抽水, sexual harassment openly)

Human Resource

- Kong Wing-fai as Kau Gwai-kei (裘貴奇; homophone to 求鬼其, too free)
- Celine Ma as Tsui Sui-ching' (崔瑞貞; homophone to 吹水精, chitchat freak) Manager of the Human Resource Department at HTDG. Sui-ching frequently picks on the three Research and Development staff, often referring to the office policies. She always talks with a lisp, pronouncing her s's as th's.
- Osanna Chiu as

Other staff members

- Nicole Wan as
- Clare Chan as
- Kate Tsang as
- June Ng as
- Helen Seng as
- Terrence Huang as
- Kelvin Yuen as
- Pauline Chow as

=== Yau Ma Tei Police station ===
- Ram Chiang Si Ko-but Sir (史高拔; homophone to English pronunciation of stupid)
- Max Cheung Lawrence Law Hon-zi Sir as (羅漢齊; homophone to 羅漢齋, Arhat vegetable, a Cantonese cuisine)

=== Extended cast ===
- Mimi Chu as Rose Ko Kwai (高瑰; homophone to 高貴, elegant)

Miu-miu's landlady. She owns and manages a traditional Chinese medicinal bone and massage clinic. Jack Chu is her business rival and enemy as he tries to lure her customers away. She is later revealed to be from the same planet of Miu-miu, she has been staying in Earth for about 30 years.

- Wai Lee as Jack Chu Sik (焦積; homophone to 招積, arrogant)

Massage gadget shop owner who is downstairs neighbor to Rose Ko. He is also business rival and enemy with Rose as he tells her clients that buying his gadget would be more cost efficient than paying a visit to Rose. He is later revealed to be Cat's father.

- Celine Yeung as Si Si (薛思思)

She is the young daughter of Garfield and Cat.

- Raymond Chiu as (何巨龍)
- Maggie Yu as (顏默)
- Sunny Tai as

== Development and production ==
- The costume fitting ceremony was held on February 5, 2016 12:30 pm at Tseung Kwan O TVB City Studio One.
- The blessing ceremony was held on April 8, 2016 1:00 pm at Tseung Kwan O TVB City Studio twelve.
- Filming took place from February till June 2016, entirely on location in Hong Kong.

== Viewership ratings ==
| Timeslot (HKT) | # | Day(s) | Week | Episode(s) | Average points | Peaking points |
|---|---|---|---|---|---|---|
| Mon - Sun (9:30-10:30 pm); 21:30–22:30 | 1 | Mon - Fri | 17 – 21 Oct 2016 | 1 — 5 | 24.2 | 27.0 |
| Mon - Sun (9:30-10:30 pm); 21:30–22:30 | 1 | Sat | 22 Oct 2016 | 6 | -- | -- |
| Mon - Sun (9:30-10:30 pm); 21:30–22:30 | 1 | Sun | 23 Oct 2016 | 7 | 18.7 | -- |
| Mon - Sun (9:30-10:30 pm); 21:30–22:30 | 2 | Mon - Fri | 24 – 28 Oct 2016 | 8 — 12 | 21.0 | -- |
| Mon - Sun (9:30-10:30 pm); 21:30–22:30 | 2 | Sat | 29 Oct 2016 | 13 | 16.1 | -- |
| Mon - Sun (9:30-10:30 pm); 21:30–22:30 | 2 | Sun | 30 Oct 2016 | 14 | 20.0 | -- |
| Mon - Sun (9:30-10:30 pm); 21:30–22:30 | 3 | Mon - Fri | 31 Oct – 04 Nov 2016 | 15 — 19 | 21.5 | -- |
| Mon - Sun (9:30-10:30 pm); 21:30–22:30 | 3 | Sun | 06 Nov 2016 | 20 | 17.1 | |
| Mon - Sun (9:30-10:30 pm); 21:30–22:30 | 4 | Mon - Fri | 07 – 11 Nov 2016 | 21 — 25 | -- | -- |
| Mon - Sun (9:30-10:30 pm); 21:30–22:30 | 4 | Sat | 12 Nov 2016 | 26 | -- | -- |
| Mon - Sun (9:30-10:30 pm); 21:30–22:30 | 4 | Sun | 13 Nov 2016 | 27 | -- | -- |
| Mon - Sun (9:30-10:30 pm); 21:30–22:30 | 5 | Mon - Fri | 14 – 18 Nov 2016 | 28 — 32 | 20.00 | |
| Total average | | | | | 20.63 | 27.0 |

November 5, 2016: No episode broadcast.

== Reception ==
Unlike its predecessor drama Ghost of Relativity, which was the highest rated TVB drama of 2015, My Lover from the Planet Meow was not well received by viewers and currently holds the title of TVB lowest rated anniversary drama with a total average rating of 20.63 beating previous lowest rated TVB anniversary drama Beauty at War, which had an average total rating of 20.67.

My Lover from the Planet Meow was criticized for its unfunny script and lead actress Krystal Tin inappropriately acting cutesy at her age. Some netizens complained that Tin was beyond her age to be playing a character who acted naive and cutesy and suggested that an younger actress should have been cast in the role of Miu Miu instead. Despite the criticism, Tin's performance garnered an award for TVB Favorite Drama Character at the 2016 TVB Star Awards Malaysia.
