= Li Jiaxin =

Li Jiaxin may refer to:

- Michelle Reis (Chinese: 李嘉欣; pinyin: Lǐ Jiāxīn, born 1970), Hong Kong actress
- Ali Lee (Chinese: 李佳芯; pinyin: Lǐ Jiāxīn, born 1982), Hong Kong actress
- Lee Chia-hsin (Chinese: 李佳馨; pinyin: Lǐ Jiāxīn, born 1997), Taiwanese badminton player
