= Perfect Man =

Perfect Man may refer to:

== Film ==
- The Perfect Man (1939 film), a Hungarian film directed by Sándor Szlatinay
- The Perfect Man (2005 film), an American film directed by Mark Rosman
- The Perfect Man, a 2011 film featuring Elise Neal
- A Perfect Man (2013 film), an American film directed by Kees Van Oostrum
- A Perfect Man (2015 film), a French film directed by Yann Gozlan
- A Perfect Man (TV series), a 2022 Hong Kong television series

== Music ==
- Perfect Man (Rage album), or the title song, 1988
- Perfect Man (Shinhwa album), or the title song, 2002
- "Perfect Man", a song by Destiny's Child from Survivor
- "Perfect Man", a song by Rufus Wainwright from Out of the Game

== Religion ==
- Al-Insān al-Kāmil, the Perfect Man in Sufism
