= Becky Lee =

Hong Kong actress, singer, and host

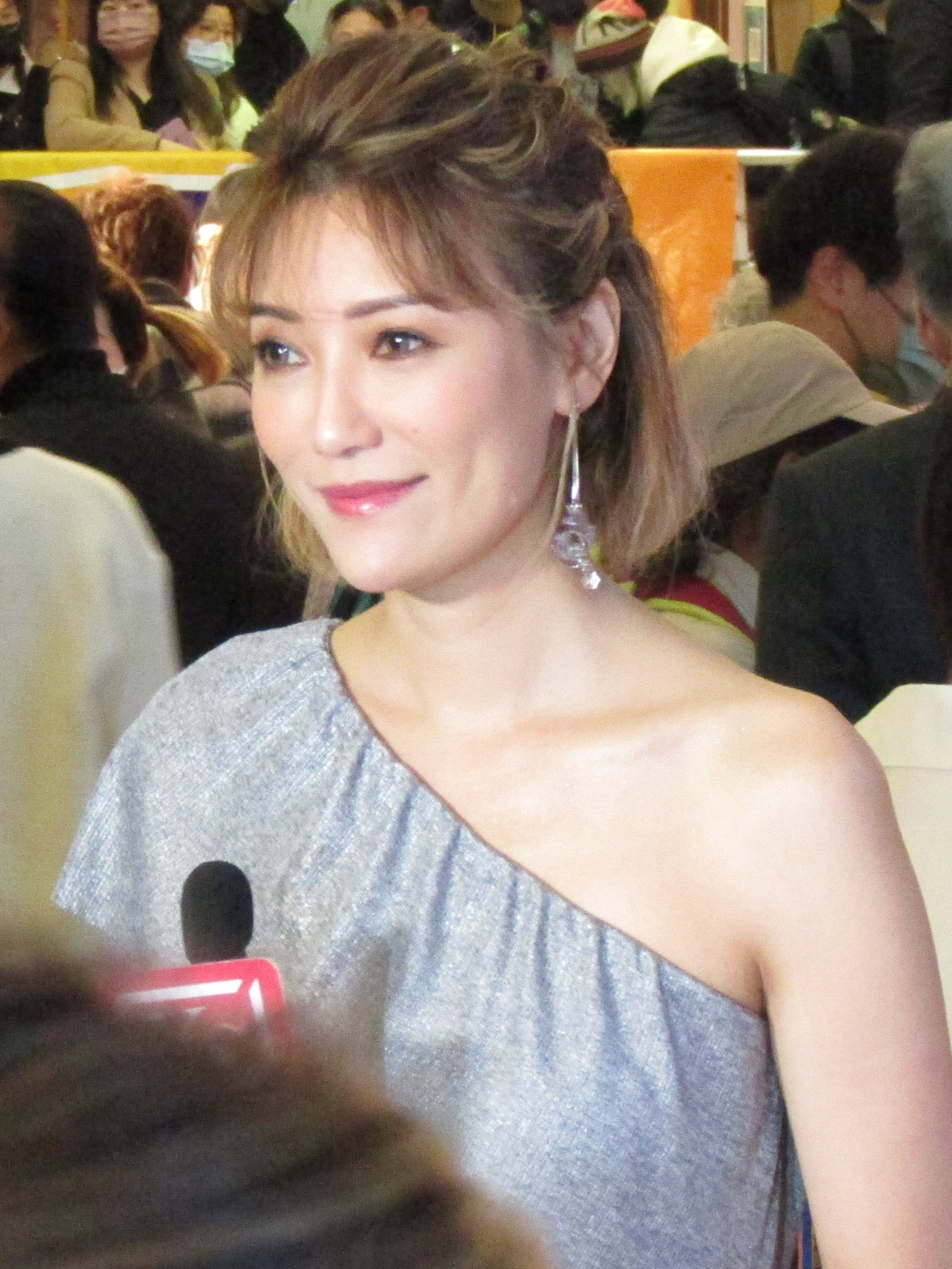
- Lee in 2021
- Born: 11 August 1978 (age 48); Hong Kong
- Occupations: Actress; host; model
- Years active: 2000–present

Chinese name
Transcriptions
Standard Mandarin
- Hanyu Pinyin: Lǐ Bìqí
Yue: Cantonese
- Jyutping: Lei5 Bik3 Kei4
- Musical career
- Origin: Hong Kong
- Label: TVB

Becky Lee (Chinese: 李璧琦, born 11 August 1978) is a Hong Kong TVB actress and host. She also is a vocal music artist. She graduated from the Music Department of Hong Kong Baptist University, majored in vocal music.

== Filmography ==
=== TV series ===
Year	Title	Role	Notes
2010	OL Supreme	Ann	
2010	Fly with Me	Model	cameo
2010	Suspects in Love	TV Announcer	Guest appearance (Ep.20)
2010	Beauty Knows No Pain	Receptionist	cameo
2010	Every Move You Make	Brand woman	cameo
2011	The Rippling Blossom	Amy	cameo
2011	Be Home for Dinner	Tong Ching-ching (Shum Hoi-yee)	
2011	My Sister of Eternal Flower	Physiotherapist	Guest appearance (Ep.20)
2011	Wax and Wane	Zita Wah Hoi-lei	
2012	Let It Be Love	Ha Tong-tong	
2013	Sergeant Tabloid	Charlie Yan Zi-nei	
2013	Brother's Keeper	Mandy Yeung Man-chi	
2013	The Hippocratic Crush II	Monica	cameo
2013	Bounty Lady	Stylish female	Guest appearance (Ep.8,17)
2014	Black Heart White Soul	Denise Chiu Man-fai	
2014	Overachievers	Man Ka-yu	cameo
2015	Eye in the Sky	Anson Chik Ling-yee	
2015	Limelight Years	Marjorina	
2015	With or Without You	Tsui Shu-mui	
2016	Fashion War	Ivy Lam Nga-si	
2016	Brother's Keeper II	Mandy Yeung Man-chi	cameo
2016	Law dis-Order	Mary Wong Wing-lam	
2018	Watch Out Boss	Lin Man-ting	
2019	PTU 2019		

=== Film ===
- The Fortune Buddies (2011) as Model
