= Fashion War =

Hong Kong television series

- Official poster
- Also known as: Trendsetter
- 潮流教主
- Genre: Drama; Fashion; Office politics
- Created by: Hong Kong Television Broadcasts Limited
- Written by: Benny Wong; Mak Sai-lung; Kwok Yat-choi; Yim Lai-wah; Yeung Suet-yee
- Starring: Moses Chan; Him Law; Sisley Choi; Ali Lee; Joel Chan; Vivien Yeo; Koni Lui; Jeannie Chan; Hanjin Tan; Leanne Li
- Theme music composer: Damon Chui
- Opening theme: Trend (潮流)
- Country of origin: Hong Kong
- Original languages: Cantonese; Mandarin
- No. of episodes: 20l

Production
- Executive producer: Catherine Tsang
- Producer: Dave Fong
- Production location: Hong Kong
- Editor: Benny Wong
- Camera setup: Multi camera
- Running time: 45 minutes
- Production company: TVB

Original release
- Network: TVB Jade
- Release: 29 February – 20 March 2016

Fashion War
- Chinese: 潮流教主
- Literal meaning: "Trendsetter"
Transcriptions
Standard Mandarin
- Hanyu Pinyin: Cháoliú Jiàozhǔ
Yue: Cantonese
- Yale Romanization: Chìuhlàuh Gāaujyú
- Jyutping: Ciu4lau4 Gaau1zyu2
- IPA: [tsʰiːṷ.lɐ̭u káːu.tsy̌ː]

Fashion War (Chinese: 潮流教主; Cantonese Yale: Chìuhlàuh Gāaujyú; literally "Trendsetter") is a 2016 Hong Kong television drama created and produced by TVB, starring Moses Chan, Him Law and Sisley Choi as the main leads. It premiered on Hong Kong's TVB Jade and Malaysia's Astro On Demand on February 29, 2016 airing Monday through Sunday during its 9:30-10:30 pm timeslot and concluding March 20, 2016 with a total of 20 episodes. The show's producer is Dave Fong, and the head writer is Benny Wong. Filming took place from April to July 2015 on location in Hong Kong.

The drama centered around the office politics of a fictional high fashion magazine in Hong Kong. It also shows the darker gritty side of the fashion industry. It mainly follows the fashion exploits of magazine editor Ip Long (Moses Chan) and his protege, Yannes Cheung (Sisley Choi). Moses Chan's character Ip Long, was modeled after Vogue magazine chief editor Anna Wintour and designer Karl Lagerfeld.

== Synopsis ==
MODES fashion magazine editor-in-chief Ip Long (Moses Chan) is feared and hated by industry peers and colleagues because of his ruthless attitude. According to him, his opinion and decision is the only one that matters. With the power he welds he forces fashion companies to only exclusively advertise with MODES or else he will not feature them in the magazine. When fashion enthuses, blogger and dress maker Yannes Cheung (Sisley Choi), interviews and gets hired at MODES he has her disqualified for the position because of the counterfeit designer handbag she is carrying. Later he sees her talent when he notices the editor board she had rearranged during her interview but still refuses to hire her.

When rival fashion magazine GINA starts emerging as a heated competitor, Long decides to hire scandalized socialite Vincy Kei (Ali Lee) who was suggested to him earlier by MODES publisher executive Man, as head of the Advertising Department to bring publicity to MODES. Vincy a head strong women who doesn't like to be looked down upon however is not happy when Long has her portray herself to the public as a sad victim of her husband's abandonment.

Ip Long becomes scandal ridden when a photograph posted on Yannes's blog shows him with a counterfeit designer luggage. Vincy who sides with Man, use the scandal to turn employees at MODES against Long in order to oust him. When Yannes is sued by Long because of her blog posting she heads to MODES head office to personally apologize to him. Long refuses to accept her apology and tells her he will proceed with his lawsuit. However the lawsuit was a publicity stunt by Long to bring attention to Yannes who he had intentions of hiring after seeing her editorial board and her passion for the magazine.

Vincy and Man finds another opportunity for Long's downfall, when Long refuses to include newly signed advertisement accounts in the upcoming issue that Vincy got for MODES. Instead Long chooses to promote an untalented mainland designer in a multi page spotlight article. Man and Vincy sets up a board of directors meeting and accuses Long of using the magazine to promote the untalented designer for his own personal gain. However Long explains his reasons to the board of directors letting them know that the untalented designer has a powerful sponsor that will help tap MODES into the Mainland market. Vincy and Man tries to downplay their accusation as a misunderstanding but Long sternly confronts Vincy and puts her in her place. Long comments further intensifies Vincy's hatred for him and she starts recruiting staff from the editorial department to betray Long. This ensues a power struggle between Long and Vincy at MODES.

== Cast ==
=== MODES Fashion Magazine ===
Editorial Department

- Moses Chan as Ip Long (葉朗)

Chief Editor of MODES magazine. Employees at MODES call him "Mentor" (教主). He is cutthroat and ruthless who refuses to yield to others. When Vincy Kei is brought into the magazine as the new head of the advertisement department he has a power struggle with her for control of the magazine.

- Jacqueline Chong as Danielle Shek Wai-san (石慧珊)

Editor at MODES and Ip Long's right hand person. She was one of Ip Long's trusted underlings until she tries to betray him by siding with Man Ci.

- Him Law as Francis Fan Kwok-pong (范國邦)

A male model with a tarnished image due to an affair with a married actress. His manager Martha Man freezes his modeling work by transferring him to MODES editorial department as an editor where he really does nothing. Yannes Cheung is put under his supervision when she is hired at MODES.

- Vivien Yeo as Ada Tsui Yi-sum (徐以芯)

Editor at MODES who thinks she is heiress apparent to the chief editor position because her father Tsui Wai is a board member of MODES parent company. Due to her having her father protect her job she likes to spread office politics pitting co-workers against each other, especially to Zoe Cheng.

- Whitney Hui as Zoe Cheng Suet-yee (鄭雪兒; Michelle Saram's Chinese name)

Editor at MODES. She lets Ada Tsui's office politic gossip get to her which made her jealous of Yannes Cheung whom she sabotages and frames her for leaked info of upcoming MODES issues.

- Sisley Choi as Yannes Cheung Yat-ning (張逸寧)

Newly hired assistant editor. A fashion blogger and dress maker who sells one off custom designs to online customers. Ip Long hires her because he sees that she has as much passion in MODES as he does.

- Jeannie Chan as Meg Lam Ho-tung (林可彤)

An assistant editor who works under Ada. She becomes fast friends with Yannes Cheung and is the only one that helps her at work, however she has a hidden selfish and vindictive streak that leads her to impulsively harm others and herself without thinking through the consequences.

- Roxanne Tong as Yuen Fong-fong (阮芳芳)

An assistant editor who works under Zoe Cheng.

Advertising Department

- Ali Lee as Vincy Kei Wan-wan (紀芸芸)

The newly hired head of advertisement at MODES. A scandal hit socialite who was abandoned by her husband. She is a head strong person who doesn't like to be looked down upon.

- Jennifer Shum as Ceci Siu Wing-chi (邵穎芝)
- Hoffman Cheng as Chris Cheung Tse-yeung (張志揚)

Trend Forecast Department

- Joel Chan as Martin Ma Sing-ho (馬承浩)

Ip Long's friend and head of the Trend department. His department really does nothing besides siding with Ip Long in MODES power struggle.

- Max Cheung as Tim Tsz-wah (詹子華)
- Penny Chan as Yan Lok-tin (甄樂天)

Social Media Department

- Becky Lee as Ivy Lam Ngar-sze (藍雅思)

Head of MODES social media department. Her department manages MODES website. She is pulled into the middle of Ip Long and Vincy's power struggle.

- Kayee Tam as Katie Leung Ka-ying (梁嘉盈)
- Cindy Lee as Law Hiu-yu (羅曉如)
- Brian Chu as Ryan So Chung-han (蘇仲衡)

Photoshoot Department

- Tyson Chak as Leung Chau-yuet (梁秋月)

MODES fashion stylist who has been with the magazine since it was first started. He doesn't like to gossip as he is aware of work personalities at the magazine.

- Eric Li as Szeto King-han (司徒敬恆)

Main photographer at MODES. Model Phoebe Sam's boyfriend.

- Alan Wan as Siu Dik-sun (蕭迪晨)

Szeto King-han’s assistant. He is in charge of videography at MODES.

=== Beauty Model Agency ===
- Leanne Li as Martha Man Yee-wah (萬綺華)

Former MODES model and current owner of Beauty Model Agency.

- Lisa Chong as Phoebe Sam Ka-yu (岑家瑜)

A model that is constantly used by MODES and Szeto King-han's girlfriend.

- Veronica Shiu as NaNa Mok Lai-na (莫麗娜)

=== HRG publishing group ===
- Hanjin Tan as Man Chi Wai-man (池偉文)

An executive at the parent company that publishes MODES. Unhappy with Ip Long's power hold of MODES he brings in Vincy Kei to help oust Long. He does not care about the quality of MODES only profits.

- KK Cheung as Ma King-sang (馬景生)

Head board member of the company that publishes MODES.

- Joseph Lee as Tsui Wai (徐偉)

A board member at the company that publishes MODES. Ada Tsui's father.

=== GINA Fashion Magazine ===
- Koni Lui as Zita Hung Sze-ting (洪詩婷)

A former editor at MODES who is now chief editor at GINA magazine.

=== Extended cast ===
- C-Kwan as Lai Tse-chuen (黎志全)

Yannes's friend who has a shop in Sham Shui Po that sells counterfeit designer bags.

- Timothy Cheng as Derek
- Gary Chan as
- Yao Bin as
- Barry Cox as Steve

Brand director of a fashion company that is forced by Ip Long into signing an exclusive advertisement contract with MODES.

== Development and production ==
- Patrick Tang and Katy Kung were offered roles in the drama to play a couple in a love triangle, but both declined due to their past real-life relationship to avoid awkwardness. Jeannie Chan was then cast in the role originally offered to Katy Kung and Eric Li was cast in the role originally offered Patrick Tang.
- The costume fitting ceremony was held on April 20, 2015 12:30 pm at Tseung Kwan O TVB City Studio One Common Room.
- The blessing ceremony was held on June 4, 2015 at Tseung Kwan O TVB City Studio.
- Filming took place from April till July 2015, entirely on location in Hong Kong. Major locations used included The ONE shopping center in Tsim Sha Tsui, Kowloon. The newly completed Rykadan Capital Tower located in Kwun Tong, Hong Kong served as MODES office building exterior and lobby.
- Ali Lee gains huge popularity with female fans through the drama.
- The drama is Koni Liu's return to acting since taking an extended break after having her son.
- A promo image of Fashion War was featured in TVB's 2016 calendar for the month of January.

== Viewership ratings ==
| Timeslot (HKT) | # | Day(s) | Week | Episode(s) | Average points | Peaking points |
|---|---|---|---|---|---|---|
| Mon - Sun (9:30-10:30 pm); 21:30–22:30 | 1 | Mon - Fri | 29 Feb - 04 Mar 2016 | 1 — 5 | 24 | 26 |
| Mon - Sun (9:30-10:30 pm); 21:30–22:30 | 1 | Sat | 05 Mar 2016 | 6 | 20 | -- |
| Mon - Sun (9:30-10:30 pm); 21:30–22:30 | 1 | Sun | 06 Mar 2016 | 7 | -- | -- |
| Mon - Sun (9:30-10:30 pm); 21:30–22:30 | 2 | Mon - Fri | 07 - 11 Mar 2016 | 8 — 12 | 26 | 27 |
| Mon - Sun (9:30-10:30 pm); 21:30–22:30 | 2 | Sat | 12 Mar 2016 | 13 | 22 | -- |
| Mon - Sun (9:30-10:30 pm); 21:30–22:30 | 2 | Sun | 13 Mar 2016 | 14 | | |
| Mon - Sun (9:30-10:30 pm); 21:30–22:30 | 3 | Mon - Fri | 14 - 18 Mar 2016 | 15 — 19 | | |
| Mon - Sun (9:30-10:30 pm); 21:30–22:30 | 3 | Sun | 20 Mar 2016 | 20 | | |
| Total average | | | | | | |

March 19, 2016: No episode broadcast due to airing 2016 Hong Kong Film Awards.

== International broadcast ==
| Network | Country | Airing date | Timeslot |
|---|---|---|---|
| Astro On Demand | Malaysia | February 29, 2016 | Monday – Sunday 9:30 – 10:30 pm |
| 8TV | Malaysia | January 12, 2018 | Monday – Friday 7:00 – 8:00 pm |
| TVBJ | Australia | March 1, 2016 | Monday – Friday 8:15 – 9:15 am |
| TVBJ | Australia | March 1, 2016 | Saturday – Sunday 9:00 – 10:00 pm |
| TVB First | Singapore | February 29, 2016 | Monday – Sunday 9:30 – 10:30 pm |
| Starhub TV | Singapore | June 15, 2016 | Monday – Sunday 9:00 – 10:00 pm |

== Awards and nominations ==
| Year | Ceremony | Category | Nominee | Result |
|---|---|---|---|---|
| 2016 | StarHub TVB Awards | My Favourite TVB Drama | Fashion War | Nominated |
| 2016 | StarHub TVB Awards | My Favourite TVB Actress | Sisley Choi | Nominated |
| 2016 | StarHub TVB Awards | My Favourite TVB Actor | Moses Chan | Nominated |
| 2016 | StarHub TVB Awards | My Favourite TVB Female TV Character | Sisley Choi | Nominated |
| 2016 | StarHub TVB Awards | My Favourite TVB Male TV Character | Moses Chan | Won |
