= Mayanne Mak =

Canadian-born television host and actress (born 1987)

- 麥美恩
- Born: 28 February 1987 (age 39); Vancouver, British Columbia, Canada
- Education: University of British Columbia
- Occupations: Television host; actress
- Years active: 2011–present
- Height: 166 cm (5 ft 5 in)
- Awards: TVB Anniversary Awards – Most Improved Female Artiste; 2017 Miss Hong Kong 2017, TVB Anniversary Gala Show, Line Walker: The Hunting Game, Sammy on the Go
- Presenting career
- Show: Sidewalk Scientist
- Network: TVB
- Time slot: 8:00–8:30 p.m. Sunday

Mayanne Mak (Chinese: 麥美恩) born February 28, 1987, is a Canadian-born Hong Kong television host and actress contracted to TVB.

== Career ==
=== 2011-2017: Miss Hong Kong Pageant and TV Host ===
Mak placed fourth in the 2011 Miss Hong Kong pageant. After joining TVB, she mainly hosts television shows and public events. Mak rose to popularity with Sidewalk Scientist, for which she has hosted since 2013. She occasionally guest starred in TV dramas as well. In 2015, Mak received attention with her role as Jessica Wong in the comedy drama Romantic Repertoire. She was one of the judges of the 2016 Miss Hong Kong contest.

=== 2018-present: Breakthrough and gaining recognition ===
In 2018, Mak won the Most Improved Female Artiste award at the 2017 TVB Anniversary Awards. She is the first recipient of this category who mainly appeared as a presenter. In 2020, Mak guest starred in the crime drama Line Walker: Bull Fight as the undercover agent Chu Sin, in which she garnered praise from netizens and earned her first nomination for the Best Supporting Actress award at the 2020 TVB Anniversary Awards. She was placed among the top 5 nominees for the same category with her role in the 2021 comedy drama AI Romantic. She was also nominated for Best Female Role, Best Supporting Actress awards and Best Female Host at the 2022 TVB Anniversary Awards.

At the 2023 TVB Anniversary Awards, she was officially recognized as a Golden MC by winning Best Master of Ceremonies Awards.

== Filmography ==
=== Television dramas ===
- This table shows the TV dramas from TVB Mayanne Mak starred.

| Year | Title | Role | Note |
| 2012 | Come Home Love | Sales | Ep.208 |
| 2012 | Come Home Love | Boutique staff | Ep.29 |
| 2013 | Season of Love | Hang Mui | Ep.9 |
| 2013 | A Great Way to Care 2 | Jenny | Ep.10, 19 |
| 2013 | The Hippocratic Crush II | Angie | Ep.2 |
| 2014 | Never Dance Alone | Young mother | Ep.27 |
| 2014 | Come On, Cousin | Host | Ep.3 |
| 2014 | Tiger Cubs II | Host | Ep.7 |
| 2015 | Raising the Bar | Journalist | Ep.19 |
| 2015 | Romantic Repertoire | Jessica Wong Sin-ting | Supporting Role |
| 2016 | Brother's Keeper II | Shum Mei-wah (younger version) | Younger version of Jade Leung’s character |
| 2016 | Two Steps From Heaven | Judy | |
| 2020 | Line Walker: Bull Fight | "Juicy" Chu Sin | Ep.1-2 |
| 2021 | AI Romantic | "Kayee" Koo Ka-yee | Major Supporting Role |
| 2021 | Hello Misfortune | Bao Sau-yuk | Major Supporting Role |
| 2022 | Your Highness | Mo Sheung | Major Supporting Role |
| 2023 | Golden Bowl | Lung Kau | Major Supporting Role |

=== Host ===
| Year | Show | Note |
| 2011–2016 | Entertainment News | lead anchor |
| 2011–2016 | EXTRA | lead anchor |
| 2011 | Hong Kong Heroes II | Appeared on 24 December |
| 2012 | Star Talk | |
| 2012 | 我要「玩」屋 | |
| 2013–2018 | Sidewalk Scientist | Joined the show in Ep.22 |
| 2013 | 2013 TVB Star Awards Malaysia | Red Carpet Host |
| 2014 | Fun Abroad | London Episodes (Ep.9-10) |
| 2015 | Good Dogter | |
| 2015 | Fun Abroad | Vancouver Episodes (Ep.53-54) |
| 2015 | 壯志衝TEEN無極限 | |
| 2015 | Fun Abroad | Italy Episodes |
| 2015 | Anchors With Passport | Germany Episodes |
| 2016 | 2016 Chinese New Year Parade - Hong Kong | |
| 2016 | A Starry Home Coming | Vancouver Episodes |
| 2016 | Touring the Hood | Ep.3 |
| 2016 | TVB Most Popular TV Commercial Awards | |
| 2016 | I Love HK | |
| 2016 | 2016 Tung Wah Charity Show | |
| 2016 | Peak to Pit | Sinkhole, Guangxi |
| 2016–2017 | Cantoxicating | |
| 2017 | zh:新春花車巡遊匯演 | as God of Wealth |
| 2017 | Sermon By Sir Ben 2 | |
| 2017 | Big Big Channel Ceremony | |
| 2017 | Chef Minor 3 | |
| 2017 | Miss Hong Kong 2017 | with Sammy Leung |
| 2017 | Sir Ben Prop Guide | |
| 2017 | Sammy on the Go | |
| 2017 | 2017 StarHub TVB Awards | |
| 2017 | 2017 TVB Star Awards Malaysia | |
| 2017 | 2017 Tung Wah Charity Show | |
| 2017 | Po Leung Kuk Charity Show | with Eric Tsang, Natalis Chan and Albert Au |
| 2018 | The Big Boss Kitchen | |
| 2018 | Big Big Channel Awards Show | |
| 2018 | Miss Chinese International Pageant | with Andrew Yuen and Patrick Lam |

== Anecdote ==
People confused her with the champion of Miss Hong Kong Pageant 2015 Louisa Mak.

== Awards and nominations ==
=== TVB Anniversary Awards ===
| Year | Category | Work | Result | Ref. |
| 2015 | Best Show Host | Sidewalk Scientist (with Ali Lee, Leung Ka-ki, Jacqueline Wong, Sammi Cheung and Roxanne Tong) | Nominated | |
| 2016 | Most Improved Female Artiste | Sidewalk Scientist; A Starry Home Coming; I Love HK; 2016 Tung Wah Charity Show; Anchors With Passport; TVB Most Popular TV Commercial Awards; Peak To Pit; Sermon By Sir Ben 2 | Nominated | |
| 2017 | Most Improved Female Artiste | Miss Hong Kong 2017; TVB Anniversary Gala Show; Line Walker: The Hunting Game; Sammy On The Go | Won | |
| 2017 | Best Show Host | Sidewalk Scientist (with Kaki Leung, Roxanne Tong, Crystal Fung, Tiffany Lau and Bowie Cheung) | Nominated | |
| 2017 | Best Show Host | Chef Minor 3 (with Bob Lam and Linna Huynh) | Nominated | |
| 2017 | Best Show Host | Sir Ben Prop Guide (with Benjamin Au Yeung, Luk Ho-ming, Bella Lam and Liz Ji) | Nominated | |
| 2017 | Best Show Host | Sammy on the Go (with Sammy Leung, Jacqueline Wong and Samantha Ko) | Nominated | |
| 2018 | Best Show Host | Sammy on the Go Sr. 2 (with Sammy Leung, Jinny Ng and Karl Ting) | Nominated | |
| 2019 | Best Show Host | Sammy on the Go Sr. 2 (with Sammy Leung, Jinny Ng and Karl Ting) | Nominated | |
| 2019 | Most Popular Onscreen Partnership | Cantoxicating (with Edmond Hui, Joey Thye and Eric Tang | Nominated | |
| 2020 | Best Show Host | Sidewalk Scientist (with Crystal Fung, Bowie Cheung, Tiffany Lau, Joey Thye, Regina Ho, Judy Kwong, Eunice Chan, Honey Ho and Sonya Chan) | Nominated | |
| 2020 | Best Supporting Actress | Line Walker: Bull Fight | Nominated | |
| 2021 | Best Supporting Actress | AI Romantic | Top 5 | |
| 2021 | Most Popular Female Character | AI Romantic | Nominated | |
| 2021 | Most Popular Onscreen Partnership | AI Romantic (with Luk Wing, Ram Chiang and Angelina Lo) | Nominated | |
| 2022 | Best Supporting Actress | Hello Misfortune | Top 10 | |
| 2022 | Best Supporting Actress | Your Highness | Nominated | |
| 2022 | Most Popular Female Character | Hello Misfortune | Nominated | |
| 2022 | Most Popular Female Character | Your Highness | Nominated | |
| 2022 | Most Popular Onscreen Partnership | Hello Misfortune (with Mark Ma) | Nominated | |
| 2022 | Best Female Host | Bong Bong, Amigo! | Top 10 | |
| 2023 | Best Supporting Actress | Golden Bowl | Nominated | |
| 2023 | Best Female Host | Super Trio Returns, Long Weekend Getaways, Gala Spectacular, TVB Anniversary Gala Show | Won | |

=== TVB Star Awards Malaysia ===
| Year | Category | Work | Result | Ref. |
| 2017 | Favorite TVB Host | Peak to Pit (with Ashley Chu, Alycia Chan, Chris Leung, Kenny Wong and Brian Tse) | Nominated | |
| 2017 | Favorite TVB Host | Sammy on the Go (with Sammy Leung, Jacqueline Wong and Samantha Ko) | Nominated | |

=== People's Choice Television Awards ===
| Year | Category | Work | Result | Ref. |
| 2021 | People's Choice Best Supporting Actress | AI Romantic | Top 10 (Ranked 9th) | |
| 2021 | People's Choice Best TV Drama Partnership | AI Romantic (with Luk Wing, Ram Chiang and Angelina Lo) | Nominated | |
