= Brother's Keeper II =

Hong Kong television series

- Official poster
- Also known as: Big Wheel II
- 巨輪II
- Genre: Dramatic programming
- Created by: Amy Wong
- Written by: Cheng Sing-mo
- Starring: Edwin Siu; Kristal Tin; Grace Chan; Louis Yuen; Hugo Ng; Jade Leung
- Theme music composer: Alan Cheung
- Opening theme: "誰可改變" (No One Can Change) by Ruco Chan
- Country of origin: Hong Kong
- Original language: Cantonese
- No. of episodes: 39

Production
- Producer: Amy Wong
- Production locations: Hong Kong; Macau; Okinawa Island
- Running time: 45 minutes
- Production company: TVB

Original release
- Network: TVB Jade
- Release: 29 August – 21 October 2016

Related
- Daddy Dearest; Two Steps from Heaven; Brother's Keeper (2013)

Brother's Keeper II
- Traditional Chinese: 巨輪II
- Simplified Chinese: 巨轮II
- Literal meaning: "big wheel"
Transcriptions
Standard Mandarin
- Hanyu Pinyin: Jù Lún Èr
Yue: Cantonese
- Yale Romanization: Geuih Lèuhn Yih
- Jyutping: Geoi6 Leon4 Ji6

Brother's Keeper II (Chinese: 巨輪II; lit. 'big wheel') is a Hong Kong television drama serial produced by Amy Wong and TVB. It is the sequel to 2013's Brother's Keeper, and takes place one year after the events of the original series. It stars Edwin Siu, Kristal Tin, Grace Chan as the main leads in the second installment of the series.

Brother's Keeper II premiered on 29 August 2016 on Hong Kong's TVB Jade. The final episode will air on 21 October 2016, totalling 39 episodes.

Brother's Keeper II differs from Brother's Keeper in types while the Brother's Keeper is focusing on historical events, the sequel is more focusing on the conflict within business.

== Synopsis ==
After years of blood, sweat, and tears, Lo Wai-son and Yiu Man-ying finally succeeded in spreading their bakery chain, Pasterilia Lo Son Kei, across Hong Kong and Macau. Their growing influence starts to upset junket promoter-turned-property developer Ko Tin-tsau, who attempts to suppress their chain from spreading even further. Along with the betrayal of his close confidant Tsui Chi-lik (Mat Yeung), Wai-son starts to lose all hope.

Overwhelmed by his chaotic world, Wai-son escapes to Okinawa, where he falls for a mysterious Hong Kong girl Nana. However, Wai-son’s special getaway also gets him entangled in an unsolved homicide that happened twenty years ago.

Meanwhile, Man-ying’s husband, Lung Fei, gets in an aviation accident and suffers a severe brain injury. He starts treating Man-ying like a stranger. Around this time, Wai-son’s older brother Sam suddenly makes a return to search for his lost love, Rachel. Facing setbacks in family, love, and business, what does Wai-son and Man-ying have to lose?

== Cast and characters ==
=== Main cast ===
- Edwin Siu as Lo Wai-shun (羅威信; Lo Waiseon): the owner of Pasterilia Lo Son Kei. Shun started off as the owner of a small peanut brittle vendor in the streets of Macau, and eventually expanded his small mobile food business to a large multi-chained bakery shop. Shun's story from rags to riches is inspired by the real-life story of Leong Chan-kuong, the owner of Macau's most famous bakery shop, Koi Kei
- Kristal Tin as Yiu Man-ying (姚文英; Jiu Manjing): Shun's best friend and the co-owner of Pasterilia Lo Son Kei.
- Grace Chan as Ko Yee-na (高伊娜) Gou Jinaa): known as Nana, Shun's love interest. She is the adopted daughter of Ko Tin-tsau, and was educated in Okinawa, Japan.
- Louis Yuen as Lung Fei (龍飛; Lung Fei): nicknamed Lung Siu (龍少; "Young Master Lung"); Ying's husband and a close friend of Shun. Educated overseas, Lung hails from a wealthy family in Macau, and works as an insurance sales agent.

=== Guest appearance ===
- Linda Chung as Rachel Cheuk (卓靜; Ceok Zing): Sam's first lover and wife and fashion designer.
- Ruco Chan as Sam Kiu (喬天生; Kiu Tinsang): Son's older brother. A former Hong Kong police officer and an ex-convict, Sam returns to Hong Kong to start anew and to search for his ex-girlfriend, Rachel. In episode five, he finds Rachel in Okinawa and realizes she has died but finds out she is not dead and ends up getting married.
- Leanne Li as Emily Cheuk (卓寧; Coek Ning): Rachel's older sister.
- Susan Tse as Lau Lai-kuen (劉麗娟; Lau Laigyun): Rachel and Emily's mother.

=== Recurring cast ===
- Hugo Ng as Ko Tin-tsau (高天鷲; Gou Tinzau): a wealthy property developer and the chairman of the Royal Condor Group. Prior to establishing the Royal Condor Group, Ko Tin-tsau was involved with the triads and is Son's enemy.
- Jade Leung as Shum Mei-wa (沈美華; Sam Meiwaa): Ko Tin-tsau's wife and a board member of the Royal Condor Group.
- Mat Yeung as Tsui Chi-lik (徐知力; Tsui Zilik): known as Luck, an ex-convict who befriends Son and Ying.
- Tsui Wing as Ma Man-tai (馬文泰; Ma Mantaai): known as Terri, a triad leader associated with Ko Tin-tsau.
- Steven Cheung as Piscine Ko (高先柏; Gou Sinpaak)—known as Pi, Ko Tin-tsau's adopted son and the legal consultant of the Royal Condor Group.
- Ali Lee as Chung Wing (鍾穎; Zung Wing): Pi's girlfriend.
- Lau Kong as Lo Fu-shing (羅富誠; Lo Fusing): Son's father.
- Becky Lee as Chief Inspector Mandy Yeung (楊曼芝; Joeng Maanzi): Sam's close friend.
- Lisa Lau as Kwok Hoi-lam (郭凱琳; Gwok Hoilam): Son and Fei's close friend and IT manager of Pasterilia Lo Son Kei.
- Chun Wong as Yiu Hang (姚亨; Jiu Hang) and Ho Yuen-tung as Yiu Ho-nam (姚浩男; Jiu Hounaam): respectively Ying's father and Ying's younger brother.
- Willie Wai as Szeto Biu (司徒標; Sitou Biu): factory manager of Pasterilia Lo Son Kei.
- Yue Chi-ming as Lung Kwong-kam (龍廣鑫; Lung Gwonggaam) and Angelina Lo as Yuen Shuk-ngo (阮淑娥; Jyun Sukngo): Fei's parents.
- Parkman Wong as Chung Kwok-po (鍾國寶; Zung Gwokbou): Wing's father and a former police officer.
- Toshimitsu Ochi as Sawa Kaneshiro (金城 沢): Emily's Japanese boyfriend.

== Viewership ratings ==
The following is a table that includes a list of the total ratings points based on television viewership. "Viewers in millions" refers to the number of people, derived from TVB Jade ratings, in Hong Kong who watched the episode live.

#	Timeslot (HKT)	Air date(s)	Episode(s)	Avg.	Peak	HK Viewers (in millions)	Ref.
1	Mon–Fri, 8:30 p.m.	29 August – 9 September 2016	1–5	23.5	26	1.52	
2	Mon–Fri, 8:30 p.m.	5–9 September 2016	6–10	22.2	—	1.44	
3	Mon–Fri, 8:30 p.m.	12–16 September 2016	11–15	20.8	—	1.35	
4	Mon–Fri, 8:30 p.m.	19–23 September 2016	16–20	22.9	—	1.48	
5	Mon–Fri, 8:30 p.m.	26–30 September 2016	21–25	21.1	—	1.36	
6	Mon–Fri, 8:30 p.m.	3–7 October 2016	26–30	23	—	1.49	
7	Mon–Fri, 8:30 p.m.	10–14 October 2016	31–35	25.3	—	1.64	
8	Tues–Fri, 8:30 p.m.	18–21 October 2016	36–39	27.5	35.2	1.78	

== International broadcast ==
- Malaysia: 8TV (Malaysia)
- Singapore: Channel U, VV Drama & Channel 8
