= Luk Wing =

Billy Luk Wing Kuen
- 陸永
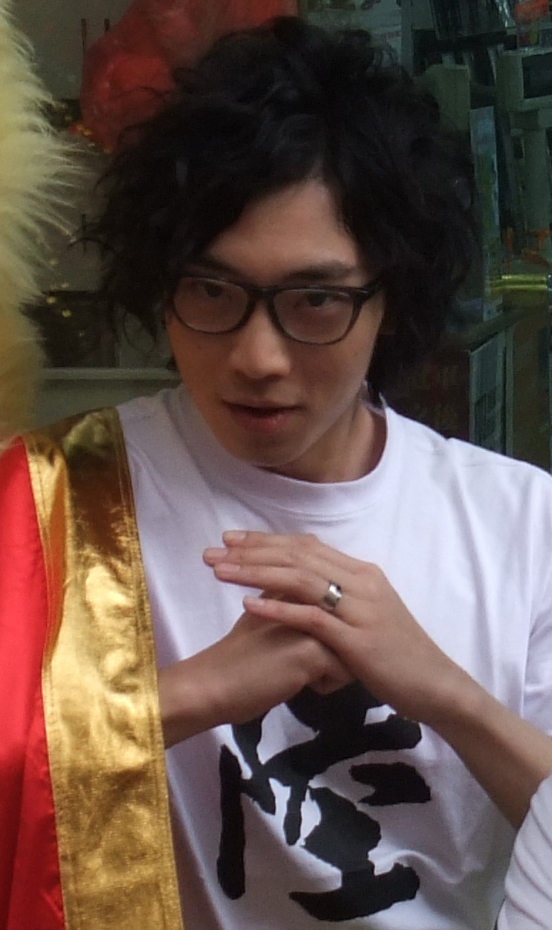
- Wing in 2008
- Born: Hong Kong
- Occupations: Rapper; actor; TV host; songwriter; comedian
- Years active: 2002–present
- Musical career
- Genres: Hip hop; Cantopop
- Instrument: Vocals
- Label: TG Management

Billy Luk Wing Kuen (Chinese: 陸永), better known as Luk Wing (often stylized as 6-Wing or 6 Wing), is a Hong Kong rapper, actor, television presenter, and comedian. Luk Wing and C Kwan are members of the hip hop duo FAMA.

== Early life and education ==
Luk Wing was born in Hong Kong.

He attended the same high school as group mate C Kwan.

== Career ==
Luk Wing and C Kwan were previously part of the hip hop group System Map. Before debuting as FAMA, Luk Wing taught children's drama classes.

After meeting DJ Tommy at a hip hop contest, C Kwan and Wing were signed to TG Management. FAMA's debut album was released November 8, 2002.

In 2006, FAMA released the single "456Wing". A solo by Wing, the single received strong airplay. FAMA reached further mainstream popularity in 2007 with the release of the song "Wind and Water Rising" 風生水起 featuring Feng Shui master Mak Ling Ling.

In July 2009, Wing headlined his own stand-up comedy show at the Sunbeam Theatre.

Wing made his television acting debut in the 2014 TVB drama series Never Dance Alone. Wing and C Kwan are frequent collaborators with television personality Carol Cheng. Together they have hosted the game show Do Did Eat and the travel program Dodo Goes Shopping. Wing, C Kwan, and Cheung are the recipients of the 2016 TVB Anniversary Award for Best Host.

In 2016, Wing portrayed Ted in the drama Two Steps From Heaven. His portrayal as the rebellious Ted was received positively and was nominated for Best Supporting Actor at the 2016 TVB Anniversary Awards. In 2019, he starred in the comedy series My Commissioned Lover and the supernatural series Barrack O'Karma.

== Filmography ==
=== Television dramas ===
Year	Title	Role	Notes
2014	Never Dance Alone	Stephen	
2014	Come Home Love	Dino	Cameo
2014	A Time of Love	police officer	Cameo; TV film
2016	Blue Veins	Kan Ting Sze (C Kwan)	
2016	Come Home Love: Dinner at 8	Green	Guest appearance
2016	Two Steps From Heaven	Ted	
2016	Rogue Emperor	Dung Zan Bong	
2017	My Ages Apart	Chung Tai	
2019	My Commissioned Lover	Long Chiu Yan	
2019	Barrack O'Karma	Choi San	
2020	Line Walker: Bull Fight		Cameo
2021	Sinister Beings		Cameo
2021	Seven Princesses	Ma Kei-chun	Nominated — TVB Anniversary Award for Best Supporting Actor
2021	AI Romantic	William Koo Ka-lim	Nominated — TVB Anniversary Award for Best Actor; Nominated — TVB Anniversary Award for Most Popular Male Character (Top 5); Nominated — TVB Anniversary Award for Most Popular Onscreen Partnership (Top 10, with Ali Lee); Nominated — People's Choice Television Award for Best Actor (Top 10); Nominated – People's Choice Television Award for Best TV Drama Partnership (Top 5, with Ali Lee); Nominated – People's Choice Television Awards for Best TV Drama Partnership (with Mayanne Mak, Ram Chiang, Angelina Lo)

=== As host ===
Year	Title	Chinese title	Notes
2009	Mini Fama Mega Fun	農夫小儀嬉	Co-host with C Kwan and Kitty Yuen
2011	Action to Money	撳錢	One of ten rotating hosts
2012	Numbers Matter	700萬人的數字	Co-host with Carol Cheng and C Kwan
2014	Gorilla Study Group	猩猩補習班	Episode 1–3, 6–20,75–87
2015, 2017	Dodo Goes Shopping	Do姐去Shopping	Co-host with Carol Cheng and C Kwan
2016	Feng Shui for the New Year	新春開運王	Chinese New Year Special
2016–2020	Do Did Eat	Do姐有問題	Co-host with Carol Cheng and C Kwan
2016	I Love HK	我愛香港	One of 12 rotating hosts
2016	Mr. Hong Kong	2016香港先生選舉	Co-host with Carol Cheng and C Kwan
2016	Miss Hong Kong	2016年度香港小姐競選	Co-host with Carol Cheng and C Kwan
2016	HK Boys in a British School	嘩鬼上學去之農夫篇	Co-host with C Kwan
2019	Do Do Midnight Quests	晚間看地球	Co-host with Carol Cheng and C Kwan
2023	Asia Super Young	亞洲超星團	Co-host with Cheng Xiao, Zhu Zhengting, Edmond So and C Kwan

=== Film ===
Year	Title	Role	Notes
2008	Happy Funeral	Himself	
2008	La Lingerie		
2009	Split Second Murders	Luk Yau Wai	
2010	72 Tenants of Prosperity	mobile phone repairer	
2010	The Jade and the Pearl	Sai Muen	
2011	I Love Hong Kong	Yip Tse Tang	
2011	Love Is the Only Answer	Leung	
2012	All's Well, End's Well 2012	Fu Yi Dai	
2012	I Love Hong Kong 2012	Kwok Fu Shing	
2013	I Love Hong Kong 2013	customer	Cameo
2013	Together	police officer	Cameo
2015	12 Golden Ducks	lawyer	
2015	One Night in Taipei	Sky	
2016	LET'S EAT!	host	
2016	PG Love		
2017	77 Heartbreaks	Ronnie	
2020	The Grand Grandmaster	Yi Sze Suk	guest appearance
2021	Zero to Hero	Victor	
