= Two Steps from Heaven (TV series) =

Hong Kong television series

- Official poster
- Also known as: Behind-the-Scenes Player
- 幕後玩家
- Genre: Drama
- Created by: Hong Kong Television Broadcasts Limited
- Written by: Mok Tse-Gai; Sin Suk-mui; Wong Ho-yin; Chung Yeh-si; Sum Lap-keung; Hui Sai-hin; Kwan Chung-ling; Leung Tse-yin; Cheng Sing-mo
- Starring: Bosco Wong; Edwin Siu; Louis Cheung; Priscilla Wong; Luk Wing; Alice Chan; Katy Kung; Moon Lau; Gloria Tang; Kandy Wong
- Theme music composer: Alan Cheung
- Opening theme: "造王" (King) by Hubert Wu
- Countries of origin: Hong Kong, China
- Original language: Cantonese
- No. of episodes: 35

Production
- Executive producer: Catherine Tsang
- Producer: Joe Chan
- Production location: Hong Kong
- Editors: Kwan Chung-ling; Cheng Sing-mo
- Camera setup: Multi camera
- Running time: 45 minutes
- Production company: TVB

Original release
- Network: Jade
- Release: 24 October – 9 December 2016

Related
- Brother's Keeper II; Rogue Emperor

Two Steps from Heaven
- Traditional Chinese: 幕後玩家
- Simplified Chinese: 幕后玩家
- Literal meaning: "Behind-the-Scenes Player"
Transcriptions
Standard Mandarin
- Hanyu Pinyin: Mùhòu Wánjiā
Yue: Cantonese
- Yale Romanization: mohk hauh wàahn gā
- Jyutping: mok6 hau6 waan4 gaa1

Two Steps from Heaven is a 2016 Hong Kong drama television series directed by Joe Chan and written by Kwan Chung-ling and Cheng Sing-mo. It premiered on 24 October 2016. The series stars Bosco Wong, Edwin Siu, and Louis Cheung as a trio working in public relations.

Katy Kung won Best Supporting Actress at the 2016 TVB Anniversary Awards for her role in the show.

== Synopsis ==
In the public relations (PR) industry, "the three musketeers" Sheldon Chun (Bosco Wong), Sean Fung Chik-yin (Edwin Siu) and Tim Yau (Louis Cheung) are known for their sharp wit and ability to defuse PR crises. As owners of their PR company, The Rainmakers, they often rub elbows with upper-class people. Sean re-encounters his ex-girlfriend Max Koo Sing-sheung (Priscilla Wong) and reconciles with her. Motivated by greed and ambition to make it to the top, Sheldon befriends Sing-sheung, who is the illegitimate child of real estate mogul Koo Fuk-sang (Pat Poon). Sean believes that he and Sing-sheung will be happy together this time, but Sing-sheung has plans to help herself and her brother Ted (Billy Luk) claim their share of their father's real estate empire.

== Cast and characters ==
=== Main ===
- Bosco Wong as Sheldon Chun Sing-hoi (秦昇海): A former journalist, he is married to Carmen and the two have a daughter named Chun Ying-sam. Although loyal to his friends Chik-yin and Tim, he is hiding an affair with Emma. Calm and devious, Sheldon aspires to be like the wealthy and influential clients he serves. As a result, he cultivates a relationship with Chik-yin's wife, Sing-sheung, in order to gain access to the Fuk Seng Properties.
- Edwin Siu as Sean Fung Chik-yin (馮汐然): Sean is kind-hearted and very loyal to his two friends. He has an eye for design and art. Though he was forced to break up with his first love Sing-sheung when they were young, they rekindle their relationship when they meet again. Although Sing-sheung's father disapproves of Sean, Sing-sheung gets married with Sean.
- Louis Cheung as Tim Yau Tin-hang (游天恆): Tim was a foster child of a staff member in Sean's restaurant and overcame his gambling addiction only after he talked to a woman from the suicide prevention hotline. He hosts public speaking classes due to his fluent Chinese. Tim tries to pursue a romantic relationship with Emma, but gives up after he learns that she is Sheldon's mistress. He later falls in love with Tsin Ka-yan, but considering her future as an actress, he chooses not to pursue her until she succeeds at her dream of becoming a movie star in South Korea.
- Priscilla Wong as Max Koo Sing-sheung: The illegitimate child of Koo Fuk-seng, she approaches Rainmakers to organize an auction for her late ex-boyfriend's artwork, encountering Chik-yin once again. She used to work for Fuk Seng Properties but left after a failed real estate project in Shanghai. After her boyfriend died in a car accident, she has insomnia and hyperventilation syndrome (HVS).
- Katy Kung as Carmen: Sheldon's wife and the mother of his daughter, Ying-sam, she is a freelance journalist. She took care of Sheldon when he was assaulted as a journalist. She is kind and devoted to her family, which Sheldon's mother appreciates and values.
- Gloria Tang as Tsin Ka-yan, a freelancer who worked odd jobs before Tim invites her to join Rainmakers. She frequently encounters Tim, who eventually falls for her. She aspires to become an actress.

=== Recurring ===
- Alice Chan as Selina Koo Sing-fun, Sing-sheung's older half-sister. She is the vice chairperson of Fuk Seng Properties. She appears friendly with Sing-sheung, but actually hates her and Ted, and does not want them working at Fuk Seng.
- Moon Lau as Emma Yip Wah: A former beauty blogger, she joins Rainmakers after an interview with Tim, whom she flirts with at work. She is secretly Sheldon's mistress and later on wants Sheldon to divorce his wife. Though she is deeply in love with Sheldon, his interest in her wanes as he turns to Sing-sheung in hopes of gaining more power and influence.
- Kandy Wong as Ada (Da), who works for Sheldon. She cultivates a friendship with Ted.
- Pat Poon as Koo Fuk-sang, the chairperson of Fuk Seng Properties.
- Ching Hor Wai as Koo Fuk-seng's wife. She spoils Ted in hopes of him being unable to work at Fuk Seng Properties and wants to keep him away from her husband.
- Claire Yiu as Carrie, who works at Rainmakers.
- Jacquelin Ch'ng as Moon Chun: Sheldon's older twin sister. Unlike Sheldon, she is emotional and careless. Moon gets sentenced to community service for hitting her cheating husband on the head.
- Billy Luk as Ted, Sing-sheung's younger brother and illegitimate child of Koo Fuk-seng. He lives a reckless life after his father sent him to study in America but later returns to Hong Kong after setting his professor's house on fire. He changes for the better after he learns the truth behind his mother's death.
- Lee Shing Cheong as Ng, a designer at Rainmakers, he later becomes Ted's mentor.

=== Other ===
- Sarah Song as Bonnie
- Yoyo Chen as Natalie, Sing-fun's assistant.
- C AllStar as themselves (episode 1)
- William Chak as Dick, a tabloid journalist who later joins Rainmakers.
- Lau Kong as Uncle Gim

== Viewership Ratings ==
#	Timeslot (HKT)	Week	Episode(s)	Average points	Peaking points
1	Mon – Fri (8:30-9:30 pm); 20:30–21:30	24 – 28 Oct 2016	1 — 5	23.0	--
2	Mon – Fri (8:30-9:30 pm); 20:30–21:30	31 Oct – 04 Nov 2016	6 — 10	24.1	25.6
3	Mon – Fri (8:30-9:30 pm); 20:30–21:30	07 – 11 Nov 2016	11 — 15	22.8	--
4	Mon – Fri (8:30-9:30 pm); 20:30–21:30	14 – 18 Nov 2016	16 — 20	23.0	--
5	Mon – Fri (8:30-9:30 pm); 20:30–21:30	21 – 25 Nov 2016	21 — 25	23.9	--
6	Mon – Fri (8:30-9:30 pm); 20:30–21:30	21 Nov – 02 Dec 2016	26 — 30	23.4	--
7	Mon – Fri (8:30-9:30 pm); 20:30–21:30	05 – 09 Dec 2016	31 — 35	25.0	28.0
Total average				23.6	28.0

== Awards and nominations ==
Year	Ceremony	Category	Nominee	Result	
2016	TVB Star Awards Malaysia	My Favourite TVB Drama Series	Two Steps from Heaven	Nominated	
2016	TVB Star Awards Malaysia	My Favourite TVB Actor in a Leading Role	Bosco Wong	Nominated	
2016	TVB Star Awards Malaysia	My Favourite TVB Actor in a Leading Role	Louis Cheung	Nominated	
2016	TVB Star Awards Malaysia	My Favourite TVB Actress in a Leading Role	Priscilla Wong	Nominated	
2016	TVB Star Awards Malaysia	My Favourite TVB Actress in a Supporting Role	Katy Kung	Nominated	
2016	TVB Star Awards Malaysia	My Favourite TVB On Screen Couple	Bosco Wong, Edwin Siu & Priscilla Wong	Nominated	
2016	TVB Star Awards Malaysia	My Favourite Top 15 TVB Drama Characters	Bosco Wong	Nominated	
2016	TVB Star Awards Malaysia	My Favourite Top 15 TVB Drama Characters	Louis Cheung	Nominated	
2016	TVB Star Awards Malaysia	My Favourite Top 15 TVB Drama Characters	Priscilla Wong	Nominated	
2016	TVB Star Awards Malaysia	My Favourite Top 15 TVB Drama Characters	Gloria Tang	Nominated	
2016	TVB Anniversary Awards	My Favourite Top 15 TVB Drama Characters	Best Series	Two Steps from Heaven	Nominated
2016	TVB Anniversary Awards	Best Actor	Bosco Wong (Top 5)	Nominated	
2016	TVB Anniversary Awards	Best Actor	Louis Cheung	Nominated	
2016	TVB Anniversary Awards	Best Actress	Priscilla Wong (Top 5)	Nominated	
2016	TVB Anniversary Awards	Most Popular TV Male Character	Bosco Wong	Nominated	
2016	TVB Anniversary Awards	Most Popular TV Male Character	Louis Cheung (Top 5)	Nominated	
2016	TVB Anniversary Awards	Most Popular TV Female Character	Priscilla Wong	Nominated	
2016	TVB Anniversary Awards	Best Supporting Actor	6 Wing	Nominated	
2016	TVB Anniversary Awards	Best Supporting Actress	Katy Kung	Won	
2016	TVB Anniversary Awards	Best Supporting Actress	Gloria Tang	Nominated	
2016	TVB Anniversary Awards	Most Popular Series Partnership	Bosco Wong, Edwin Siu & Louis Cheung	Nominated	
2016	TVB Anniversary Awards	Most Popular Series Song	"King" (造王) by Hubert Wu	Nominated	
