= A Perfect Man (TV series) =

Hong Kong television series (2022–2023)

- Also known as: 有種好男人
- Genre: Romance; Drama
- Written by: Sin Chui-ching; Fung Yat-chun
- Directed by: Cheung Wing-fai; Chan Yim-kei; Lam Man-sing; Au Chun-yip
- Starring: Ali Lee; Joe Ma; Ricco Ng
- Opening theme: "Limelight Years" by Shiga Lin
- Country of origin: Hong Kong
- Original language: Cantonese
- No. of episodes: 20

Production
- Producer: Leung Yiu-kin
- Running time: 43 minutes
- Production company: TVB

Original release
- Network: TVB Jade; myTV Super
- Release: 26 December 2022 – 20 January 2023

A Perfect Man (Chinese: 有種好男人; lit. 'A Certain Kind of Good Man') is a Hong Kong television series created and produced by television network TVB. It premiered on 26 December 2022 and ran until 20 January 2023, spanning 20 episodes. Starring Joe Ma and Ali Lee, the series centers on a young mother's journey to discover her son's biological father and her story of falling in love in the process.

== Cast ==
- Ali Lee as Charlie Yau Chi-ching – a widow who returns from England. She works as an office clerk at the Chong Kin Bong Security Limited agency (CKBSL). The character is depicted as a young mother, and her bond with Ricco Ng, who plays her 17-year-old son, is described to resemble that of a sibling-like relationship, characterized by mutual teasing and care.
- Joe Ma as Yeung Yat-ching – a bodyguard and supervisor working at the CKBSL
- Ricco Ng as Woody Miu Sing-lam – Charlie's 17-year-old son who returns from England
- Tsui Wing as Ha Chung-chau – a bodyguard working at CKBSL and Yat-ching's close friend
- Yoyo Chen as Feya Yeung Fei-wan – Yat-ching's aunt who is younger than him by age
- John Au as Chong Kin-bong – the CEO of CKBSL
- Candice Chiu as Anson Chong Nga-sang – Kin-bong's daughter
- Raymond Cho as Fu Chun – Anson's husband and the investigation manager at CKBSL
- Cheung Kwok Keung as Tseung Ding-tin – a business tycoon
- Niklas Lam as Terence Tseung Cheuk-ting - Ding-tin's son who returns from England
- Griselda Yeung as Rosanna Law Siu-na – Kin-bong's deceased wife's sister who works as an administrative manager at CKBSL
- Alice Fung So-bor as Yiu Mei-chi – Yat-ching's estranged mother who resides in the United States
- Jimmy Au as Lai Wang-chi – a bodyguard and manager at CKBSL
- Jeffery Lai as Tin Chung Chik-nam – a wealthy Japanese corporate heir
- Toby Chan as Tam Lei-yan – Yat-ching's girlfriend
- Derek Macksy as Miu Kin-fung – Charlie's deceased husband

== Plot ==
Yeung Yat-ching's childhood was marked by tragedy, as he lost his father in a car accident and his mother left him to start a new life in America with a new partner. These experiences had a profound and lasting impact on him, shaping his skeptical outlook on marriage due to his mother's actions and his own relationship failures. Presently, Yeung Yat-ching works as a security manager at the respected Chong Kin Pong Security agency. It is there that he crosses paths with Charlie Yau. Charlie, who used IVF due to her late husband's infertility, returns to Hong Kong from England in search of her son Woody's biological father, surprisingly revealed to be Yeung Yat-ching. As the series progresses, Yat-ching and Charlie's relationship deepens, but they face challenges that strain their bond. The past secrets and Woody's actions add to the tension. Amidst a kidnapping incident and life-threatening medical conditions, Yat-ching, Charlie, and Woody must confront their pasts, their emotions, and the uncertainties of the future.

== Production and background ==
The series was produced by Leung Yiu-kin, with script supervision by Sin Chui-ching and Fung Yat-chun, and directed by a rotating team of directors. Principal photography took place in the latter half of 2021. Set in the bodyguard industry, the storyline reportedly includes depictions inspired by certain aspects of the G4's working procedures and habits.

Regarding her role, lead actress Ali Lee candidly acknowledged in an interview that her greatest challenge was portraying a mother to a 17-year-old son, played by Ricco Ng. She had to envision the entire journey from childbirth to raising her child and experiencing their shared moments. To prepare, she studied real-life mothers and watched a variety of TV dramas to better understand the emotions and experiences involved in nurturing a child.

== Music ==
Track Listing
No.	Title	Lyrics	Music	Artist(s)	Length
1.	"Limelight Years (好男人)"	Hayes Yeung	Alex Lau	Shiga Lin	2:35

== Reception and ratings ==
The series reached its peak with a rating of 22.6 points, equivalent to 1.45 million viewers. Ali Lee received praise for her adept portrayal of emotional scenes.

Week	Episodes	Airing dates	Average ratings (Note: According to Hong Kong's TV rating system, each rating point represents approximately 64,670 viewers.)	Ref.
1	1 – 5	26–30 December 2022	22.6 points	
2	6 – 10	2–6 January 2023	22.4 points	
3	11 – 15	9–13 January 2023	22 points	
4	16 – 20	16–20 January 2023	22.6 points	
Average Total:			22.4 points	
