= Sidewalk Scientist =

- Genre: Informational
- Presented by: Kaki Leung; Ali Lee; Jacqueline Wong; Mayanne Mak; Sammi Cheung; Roxanne Tong; Crystal Fung; Bowie Cheung; Tiffany Lau; Judy Kwong; Regina Ho; Honey Ho; Eunice Chan; Joey Thye
- Country of origin: Hong Kong
- Original language: Cantonese
- No. of seasons: 7
- No. of episodes: 123

Production
- Executive producer: Lam Chi-wing
- Producer: TVB
- Editor: Fung Hoi-kei
- Running time: 25 minutes

Original release
- Network: TVB
- Release: 20 April 2013 – 15 January 2017

Sidewalk Scientist (Chinese: 學是學非; Jyutping: hok6 si6 hok6 fei1; lit. 'Learn Right and Wrong') is a Hong Kong TV programme broadcast by TVB and presented by Kaki Leung, Ali Lee, Jacqueline Wong, Mayanne Mak, Sammi Cheung, Roxanne Tong, Crystal Fung, Bowie Cheung, Tiffany Lau, Judy Kwong, Regina Ho, Honey Ho, Eunice Chan and Joey Thye. This programme explores the scientific knowledge in daily life through different experiments. Despite its English title, there are also segments to correct common misuse of English or Chinese, to clarify of legal misconceptions and to introduce local history. Sammy Leung was invited as guest host of the special episode of season 1 and has since become a returning guest host in following seasons. In season 2, a male guest host will join in as 'Captain'. In season 3, all of the episodes revolved around sports.

The show was nominated at the 2013, 2015 and 2016 TVB Anniversary Awards for the Best Informative Programme, and won the award in 2016.

== Topics ==
A very wide range of topics have been covered by the show, such as:

- Are there more bacteria in your mouth than on a toilet seat?
- Will dry ice explode?
- Are there any alternative uses of salt?
- Can a human walk on eggs?

== Awards and nominations ==
Year	Category	Nominee	Result
2013	Best Informative Programme	Sidewalk Scientist (Season 1)	Nominated
2015	Best Informative Programme	Sidewalk Scientist (Season 3)	Nominated
2016	Best Informative Programme	Sidewalk Scientist (Season 4)	Won
