= Mr. Perfect =

Mr. Perfect may refer to:

- Curt Hennig (1958–2003), American wrestler who used the name "Mr. Perfect" in the ring
- Jerry Stubbs (born 1952), American wrestler who used the name "Mr. Perfect" in the ring
- Ernesto Hoost (born 1965), Dutch kickboxer who used the name "Mr. Perfect" in the ring
- Mr. Perfect (film), a 2011 Indian romantic comedy film by Dasaradh, starring Prabhas in the title role
  - Prabhas (born 1979), Indian actor, sometimes nicknamed Mr. Perfect
- "Mr. Perfect" (song), a 2011 song by Greek-Swedish singer Elena Paparizou
- "Mr. Perfect", a song from the 2009 Indian film Arya 2
- "Mr. Perfect", a song from the 2017 Indian film Raajakumara
- Mr. Perfect (Mr. Men), a character from the Mr. Men book and animation series

== See also ==
- Aamir Khan (born 1965), Indian actor known as "Mr. Perfectionist"
- Ms. Perfect, a 2017 South Korean film
