= Ali Lee =

Hong Kong actress

- 李佳芯
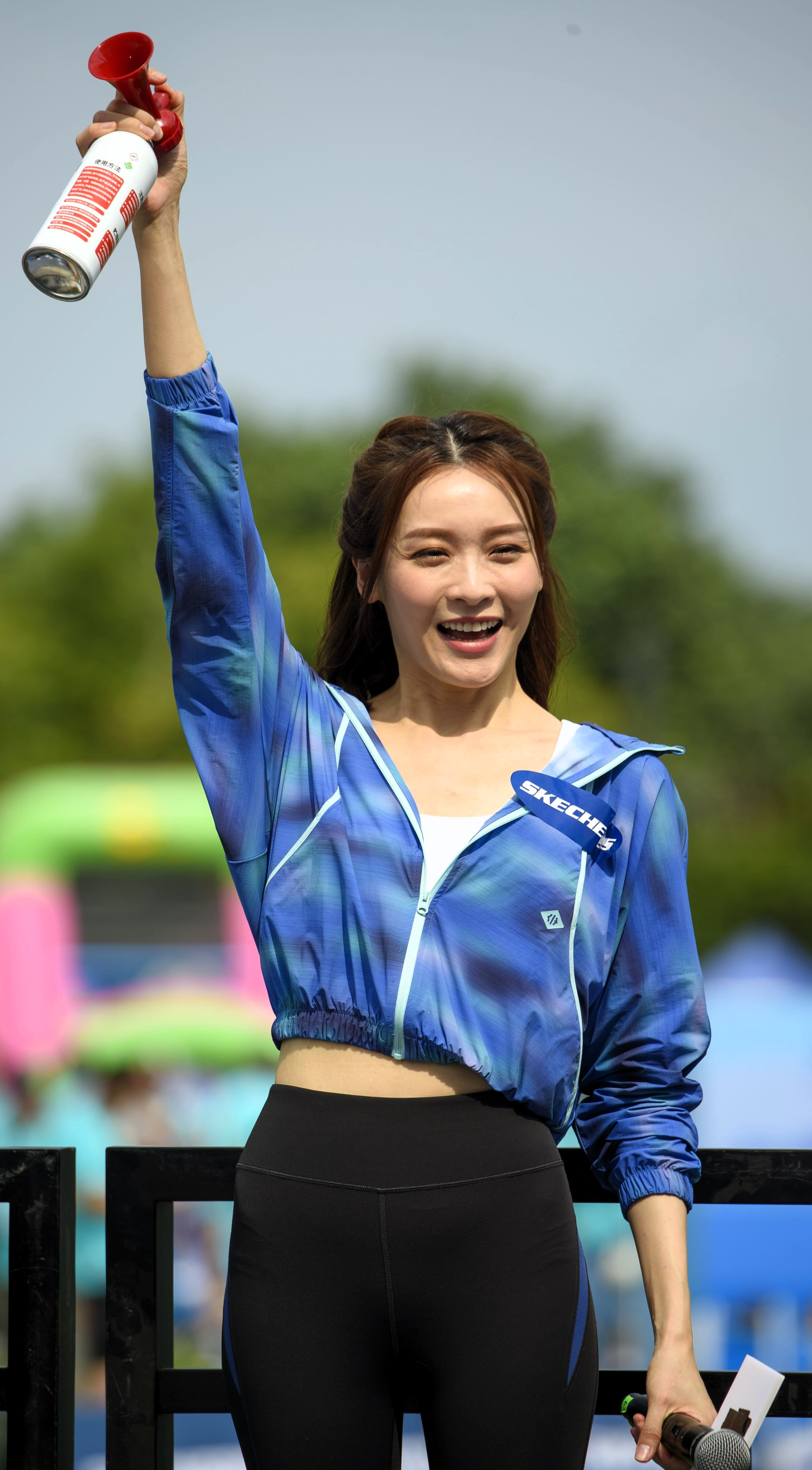
- Lee in 2024
- Born: Lee Ka-hing 李嘉馨; Léih Gāhīng (Cantonese); Lǐ Jiāxīn (Mandarin); 27 November 1982 (age 43); British Hong Kong
- Occupations: Actress, television presenter
- Years active: 2008–present
- Notable work: Legal Mavericks; Who Wants A Baby? Big White Duel; AI Romantic
- Partner: Danny Chan (2015–2020)
- Awards: TVB Anniversary Awards – Most Improved Female Artiste; 2016 Fashion War, Brother's Keeper II, Law dis-Order; Best Actress; 2018 Who Wants A Baby? Most Popular Female Character; 2021 Beauty And The Boss StarHub TVB Awards – Most Improved TVB Artiste; 2016; My Favourite TVB Actress; 2017 Legal Mavericks People's Choice Television Awards – People's Choice Best Actress; 2021 AI Romantic

Chinese name
- Traditional Chinese: 李佳芯
- Simplified Chinese: 李佳芯
Transcriptions
Standard Mandarin
- Hanyu Pinyin: Lǐ Jiāxīn
Yue: Cantonese
- Yale Romanization: Léih Gāaisām
- Jyutping: Lei5 Gaai1sam1

Ali Lee Kai-sum (Chinese: 李佳芯; Jyutping: Lei^{5} Gaai^{1} Sam^{1}; born 27 November 1982) is a Hong Kong actress and television host contracted to TVB.

Lee first received attention as a television presenter for Cable TV Hong Kong's entertainment and sports channels, having covered popular television programs such as King of Sports (體育王) and Amazing Spaces (空間大改造). In 2012, she signed an artiste contract with TVB. Lee won the Most Improved Female Artiste award at the 2016 TVB Anniversary Awards. In 2018, she won the TVB Anniversary Award for Best Actress with her role in the drama Who Wants A Baby?.

== Career ==
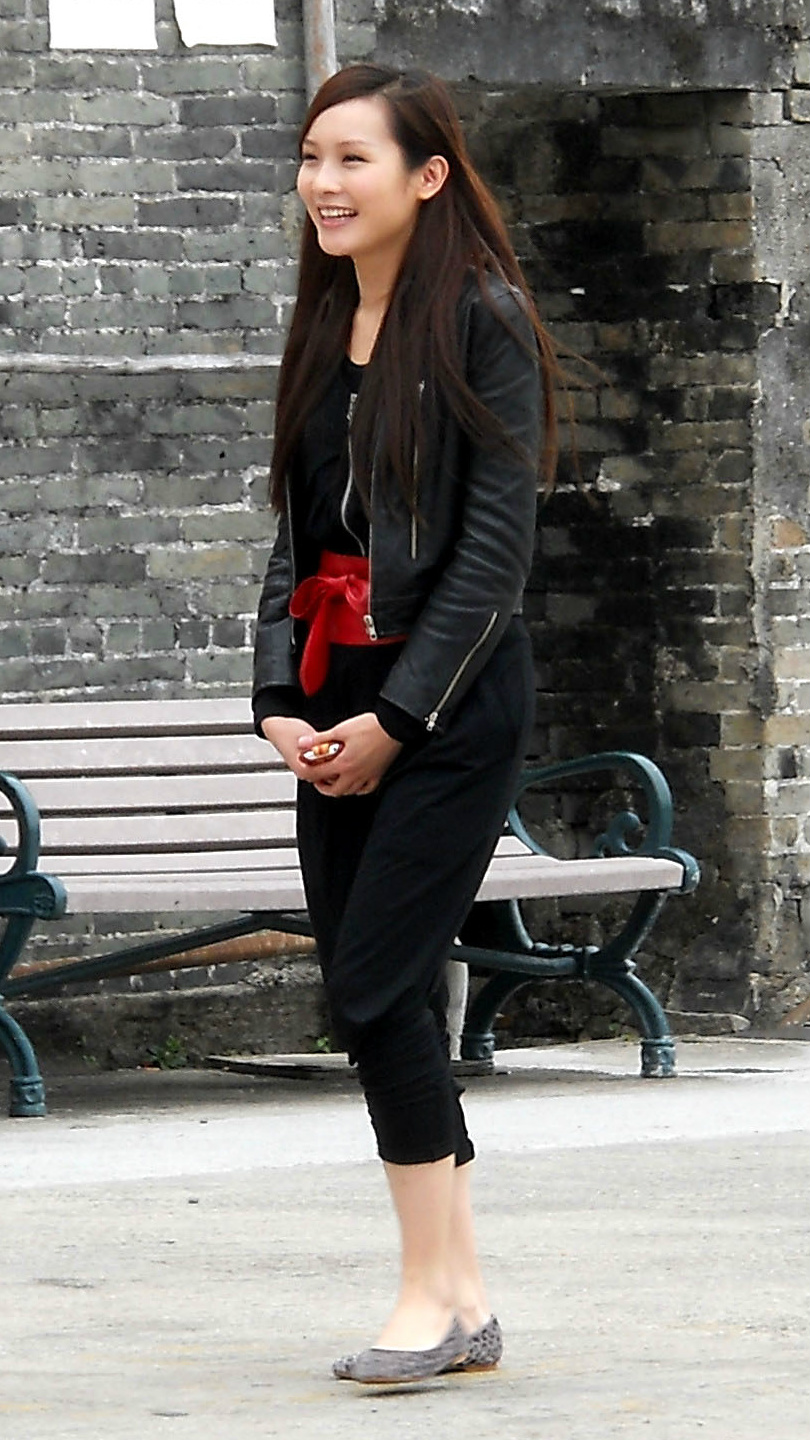
Lee in 2011

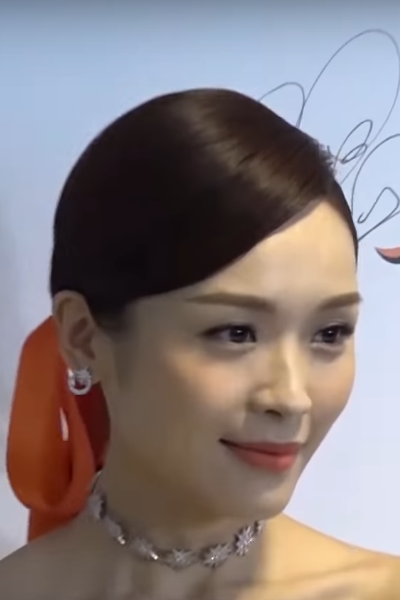
Lee in 2019

After receiving an associate degree in visual arts from the City University of Hong Kong, Lee briefly worked as a model for the magazine Weekend Weekly (新假期) and starred in a few television commercials. In 2008, Lee signed with Cable TV Hong Kong and began hosting numerous television programmes for the cable broadcaster, including entertainment shows, travelogues, and sports programmes. In 2011, she made her acting debut in the miniseries ICAC Investigators 2011.

Upon her contract expiration with Cable TV, Lee joined TVB in late 2012. She appeared in FIFA Confederations Cup 2013 - Kick-Off Carnival and mainly played minor supporting roles in television dramas.

Lee began to receive attention with her villainous role in the 2014 TVB anniversary drama, Overachievers. In 2015, she participated in the dramas Raising the Bar, My "Spiritual" Ex-Lover, and Rear Mirror, garnering her first nominations for Most Improved Female Artiste and Best Supporting Actress.

In the 2016 drama Fashion War, Lee played Vincy Kei, a headstrong socialite in a power struggle with Moses Chan’s character. She took on her first female leading role in the legal drama Law dis-Order, starring opposite veterans Alex Fong and Liu Kai-chi, earning her first nominations for Best Actress and Most Popular Female Character at the 2016 TVB Anniversary Awards. Lee gained recognition as an actress by winning the Most Improved Artiste awards at both the 2016 StarHub TVB Awards and TVB Anniversary Awards.

Lee was cast to replace Tavia Yeung, who did not renew her contract, in the 2017 drama The Provocateur. She played Never Wong, a flirtatious judge in the legal drama Legal Mavericks, for which she won My Favourite TVB Actress award at the 2017 StarHub TVB Awards. In the comedy drama My Ages Apart, Lee played Paris Sheung, an heiress and unpopular actress who wanted to find true love. She was placed among top 5 in both Best Actress and Most Popular Female Character at the 2017 TVB Anniversary Awards.

In 2018, Lee earned critical acclaim in the family drama Who Wants A Baby?. She played Ellen Tong, a new mother who struggled to balance her responsibilities. Lee won the Best Actress award at the 2018 TVB Anniversary Awards, becoming the first TVB artiste to have won the accolade only two years after being awarded the Most Improved Female Artiste award. She also guest starred in the drama Life on the Line as the wife of Joe Ma’s character.

In 2019, Lee played cardio-thoracic surgeon Kennis Ching in the critical acclaimed medical drama Big White Duel. In July 2019, due to her politicized social media posts, Lee was supposedly dropped from several drama series, including the sequels to Legal Mavericks, Who Wants a Baby? and Big White Duel.

In 2020, Lee made her acting comeback in the action drama Death By Zero, in which she played a single mother who became the assistant of an assassin. In July, she published a memoir titled Where The Heart Is.

In 2021, Lee played a divorced secretary in the romantic drama Beauty and the Boss, again starring opposite Moses Chan. With her role in the drama AI Romantic, she was highly praised for her portrayal as an android and became a strong contender for Best Actress. With her role as Amelia Wong in Beauty and the Boss, Lee won the Most Popular Female Character award at the 2021 TVB Anniversary Awards. In 2022, she was one of the 12 contestant's in the second season of TVB's variety show Dub of War.

== Personal life ==
Lee dated former ViuTV artiste and stage actor Danny Chan from 2015 to 2020.

== Filmography ==
=== Television dramas ===
Year	Title	Role	Notes
2011	ICAC Investigators 2011	Ashley	Single Unit Female Lead (Ep. 4)
2014	Outbound Love	Sue	Cameo
2014	Gilded Chopsticks	Consort Yee	Cameo
2014	Swipe Tap Love	Couple	Cameo
2014	Ghost Dragon of Cold Mountain	Consort Yuen	Supporting Role
2014	Come Home Love	Susanna Kwan	Cameo
2014	Rear Mirror	Yuen Ka-po	Supporting Role
2014	Overachievers	Ivy Yu Sze-lam	Supporting Role
2014	Tiger Cubs II	Cheung To	Supporting Role
2015	Raising the Bar	Sum Lai-ching	Supporting Role
2015	My "Spiritual" Ex-Lover	Nine-tailed fox	Supporting Role
2015	Under the Veil	Chak-sin	Supporting Role
2016	Fashion War	Vincy Kei Wan-wan	Major Supporting Role; StarHub TVB Award for Most Improved Female Artiste; TVB Anniversary Award for Most Improved Female Artiste
2016	Brother's Keeper II	Chung Wing	Supporting Role; StarHub TVB Award for Most Improved Female Artiste; TVB Anniversary Award for Most Improved Female Artiste
2016	Law dis-Order	Hazel Cheuk Yi-chung	1st Female Lead; TVB Star Award Malaysia for Top 15 Favourite TVB Drama Characters; StarHub TVB Award for Most Improved Female Artiste; TVB Anniversary Award for Most Improved Female Artiste
2017	Provocateur	Rachel Chan Hei-man	1st Female Lead
2017	Legal Mavericks	Never Wong Lai-fan	2nd Female Lead; StarHub TVB Award for My Favourite TVB Actress; TVB Star Award Malaysia for Top 17 Favourite TVB Drama Characters
2017	My Ages Apart	Paris Sheung Ho-yiu	2nd Female Lead
2018	Watch Out Boss	Roxie Yiu Lok-sze	Major Supporting Role
2018	Who Wants a Baby?	Ellen Tong Tim-yi	1st Female Lead; TVB Anniversary Award for Best Actress
2018	Life On The Line	Cheung Wai-sum	Guest Appearance
2019	Big White Duel	Dr. Kennis Ching Lok-man	2nd Female Lead; StarHub Night of Star for Favourite TVB Character
2020	Death By Zero	Cash Chin Heung-sin	1st Female Lead
2021	Beauty and the Boss	Amelia Wong Lai-mei	1st Female Lead; TVB Anniversary Award for Most Popular Female Character
2021	AI Romantic	Ah Bo	1st Female Lead; People's Choice Television Awards for Best Actress
2022	A Perfect Man	Charlie Yau Tsz-ching	1st Female Lead
2025	Heavenly Hand	Cheung Tet	Lead role

=== Films ===
- If You Care... (2002)
- Golden Boy (2025)

=== Dubbing ===
- Dub of War's Second Season Graduation Project: Spider-Man: No Way Home (2022)- Michelle Jones Watson "MJ"

=== Variety shows and informative programs ===
with Cable TV Hong Kong

- 《四小強繼續Look》
- 《體育王》
- 《2010有線世界盃嘉年華》
- 《有線1台世界盃》
- 《空間大改造》
- 《空間大改造2》
- 《1963》- 梳打埠的年華
- 《西西里的十二夜》
- 《普羅旺斯的十二夜》
- 《日本東北的十二夜》
- 《60/80任你UP》
- 《冰島·千年一嘆》
- 《一屋一LOOK新部屋》
- 《有線製造》
- 《香港空間大改造》
- 《阿拉伯．千年一嘆》
- 《空間大改造3》
- 《四個轆．德國周圍Look》
- 《最佳愛情．首爾攻略》
- 《那些回憶．似曾相識》
- 《遨遊天地》
- 《美味關係》
- 《潮玩潮食》
- 《空間大改造4》
- 《去吧！台灣住囉囉》
- 《北京狂想曲》

with TVB

- Organized Dining (J2)
- 《中醫神探》(J2)
- So Hong Kong (Jade)
- Go! Yama Girl (J2)
- Girls Go Hiking (J2)
- 《跑出信念》(J2)
- Sidewalk Scientist (Jade)
- Anchors with Passport (Series 2) (Jade)
- A Chef and A Gentleman (ep. 4 & 5)
- Liza's On Line (ep. 15)
- Dub of War （好聲好戲） (Jade)

== Awards and nominations ==
=== TVB Anniversary Awards ===
Year	Category	Work	Result
2015	Best Show Host	Sidewalk Scientist (with Leung Ka-ki, Jacqueline Wong, Mayanne Mak, Sammi Cheung, Roxanne Tong)	Nominated
2015	Best Supporting Actress	My "Spiritual" Ex-Lover — Nine-tailed fox	Nominated
2015	Most Improved Female Artiste	Raising the Bar, My "Spiritual" Ex-Lover, Rear Mirror, Organized Dining, Sidewalk Scientist, So Hong Kong	Nominated
2016	Most Improved Female Artiste	Fashion War, Brother's Keeper II, Law dis-Order, Organized Dining, Sidewalk Scientist, Anchors With Passport (Sr. 2)	Won
2016	Best Actress	Law dis-Order — Cheuk Yi-chung (Hazel)	Nominated
2016	Most Popular Female Character	Law dis-Order — Cheuk Yi-chung (Hazel)	Nominated
2017	Best Actress	My Ages Apart — Sheung Ho-yiu (Paris)	Top 5
2017	Most Popular Female Character	My Ages Apart — Sheung Ho-yiu (Paris)	Top 5
2018	Best Actress	Who Wants A Baby? — Tong Tim-yi (Ellen)	Won
2018	Most Popular Female Character	Who Wants A Baby? — Tong Tim-yi (Ellen)	Top 5
2018	Favourite TVB Actress in Malaysia	Who Wants A Baby? — Tong Tim-yi (Ellen)	Top 3
2018	Favourite TVB Actress in Singapore	Who Wants A Baby? — Tong Tim-yi (Ellen)	Top 3
2019	Best Actress	Big White Duel — Ching Lok-man (Kennis)	Top 5
2019	Most Popular Female Character	Big White Duel — Ching Lok-man (Kennis)	Nominated
2020	Best Actress	Death By Zero — Chin Heung-sin (Cash)	Top 5
2020	Most Popular Female Character	Death By Zero — Chin Heung-sin (Cash)	Top 5
2020	Favourite TVB Actress in Malaysia	Death By Zero — Chin Heung-sin (Cash)	Nominated
2021	Best Actress	Beauty And The Boss — Wong Lai-mei (Amelia)	Nominated
2021	Best Actress	AI Romantic — Ah Bo	Top 5
2021	Most Popular Female Character	Beauty And The Boss — Wong Lai-mei (Amelia)	Won
2021	Most Popular Female Character	AI Romantic — Ah Bo	Nominated
2021	Favourite TVB Actress in Malaysia	Beauty And The Boss — Wong Lai-mei (Amelia)	Top 5
2021	Favourite TVB Actress in Malaysia	AI Romantic — Ah Bo	Nominated
2021	Most Popular Onscreen Partnership	AI Romantic (with Luk Wing)	Top 10
2023	Best Actress	The Perfect Man — Yau Tsz-ching (Charlie)	Top 10
2023	Favourite TVB Actress in Malaysia	The Perfect Man — Yau Tsz-ching (Charlie)	Nominated
2023	Best Female Host	Listen To Your Body, 18 Ways Of Living In Japan	Top 10

=== TVB Star Awards Malaysia ===
Year	Category	Work	Result
2016	Top 15 Favourite TVB Characters	Law dis-Order — Cheuk Yi-chung (Hazel)	Won
2016	Favourite TVB Actress	Law dis-Order — Cheuk Yi-chung (Hazel)	Nominated (Top 5)
2017	Top 17 Favourite TVB Characters	Legal Mavericks — Wong Lai-fan (Never)	Won
2017	Favourite TVB Actress	Legal Mavericks — Wong Lai-fan (Never)	Nominated (Top 3)

=== StarHub TVB Awards ===
Year	Category	Work	Result
2016	Most Improved TVB Artiste	—N/a	Won
2017	My Favourite TVB Actress	Legal Mavericks — Wong Lai-fan (Never)	Won

=== StarHub Night of Star ===
Year	Category	Work	Result
2019	Favourite TVB Character	Big White Duel — Ching Lok-man (Kennis)	Won

=== Yahoo Asia Buzz Awards ===
Year	Category	Result
2018	Television Female Artiste	Won
2020	Television Female Artiste	Won

=== People's Choice Television Awards ===
Year	Category	Work	Result
2018	People's Choice Best Actress	Who Wants A Baby? — Tong Tim-yi (Ellen)	Nominated (Ranked 4th)
2019	People's Choice Best Actress	Big White Duel — Ching Lok-man (Kennis)	Nominated (Ranked 2nd)
2021	People's Choice Best Actress	Beauty And The Boss — Wong Lai-mei (Amelia)	Nominated (Ranked 7th)
2021	People's Choice Best Actress	AI Romantic — Ah Bo	Won
2021	People's Choice Best TV Drama Partnership	AI Romantic — Ah Bo (shared with Luk Wing)	Nominated (Ranked 5th)

=== Other nominations ===
Year	Award	Category	Work	Result
2018	Asian Television Awards	Best Actress	My Ages Apart — Sheung Ho-yiu (Paris)	Nominated
2018	Hong Kong Television Awards	Best Leading Actress in Drama Series	Who Wants A Baby? — Tong Tim-yi (Ellen)	Nominated (Ranked 2nd)
2020	hk01 Television Drama Awards	Best Actress	Death By Zero — Chin Heung-sin (Cash)	Nominated (Ranked 2nd)
