= Yue Chi-ming =

Hong Kong actor (1944–2022)

Yue Chi-Ming
- 余子明
- Born: 10 December 1944; Hong Kong
- Died: 10 November 2022 (aged 77); Hong Kong
- Other name: Yu Chi-ming
- Occupation: Actor

Yue Chi-ming (Chinese: 余子明; 10 December 1944 – 10 November 2022) was a Hong Kong actor and singer.

== Life and career ==
Born in Hong Kong, Chi-ming started his career as a news reporter before transitioned to a singer after winning an amateur singing contest in 1968, and in 1976 he was put under contract as an actor by the TVB broadcaster, making his acting debut in the TV-series Huānlè jīn xiāo (Chinese: 欢乐金宵; "Happy Golden Night"). In 1986 he left the showbusiness and moved with his family to Vancouver; returned to Hong Kong in 1997, he successfully reprised his career, specializing in roles of Teochew people, eunuchs and elder characters.

Yue died of complications of a stroke on 10 November 2022, at the age of 78.
