= Law dis-Order =

Hong Kong television series

- Official poster
- Also known as: Legal Strongman
- 律政強人
- Genre: Modern Drama, Legal, Office Politics
- Created by: Hong Kong Television Broadcasts Limited
- Written by: Wong Wai-keung (head writer)
- Starring: Alex Fong; Liu Kai-chi; Ali Lee; Mandy Wong; Raymond Cho; Florence Kwok; Matthew Ho
- Theme music composer: Alan Cheung
- Opening theme: "Choice of Justice" (公義的抉擇) by Hubert Wu
- Country of origin: Hong Kong
- Original language: Cantonese
- No. of episodes: 28

Production
- Executive producer: Catherine Tsang
- Producer: Marco Law
- Production location: Hong Kong
- Editor: Ng Siu-tung
- Camera setup: Multi camera
- Running time: 45 minutes
- Production company: TVB

Original release
- Network: TVB Jade
- Release: 19 September – 16 October 2016

Law dis-Order
- Traditional Chinese: 律政強人
- Simplified Chinese: 律政强人
- Cantonese Yale: Leuhtjing Kèungyàn
- Literal meaning: "Legal Strongman"
Transcriptions
Standard Mandarin
- Hanyu Pinyin: Lǜzhèng Qiángrén
- Bopomofo: ㄌㄩˋㄓㄥˋ ㄑㄧㄤˊㄖㄣˊ
Yue: Cantonese
- Yale Romanization: Leuhtjing Kèungyàn
- Jyutping: Leot6zing3 Koeng4jan4
- IPA: [lɵ̀t̚.tsēŋ kʰœ̏ːŋ.jɐ̏n]

Law dis-Order (Chinese: 律政強人; Cantonese Yale: Leuhtjing Kèungyàn; literally "Legal Strongman") is a 2016 Hong Kong television legal drama produced by Marco Law for TVB, starring Alex Fong, Liu Kai-chi, Ali Lee and Mandy Wong as the main leads. It premiered on Hong Kong's TVB Jade and Malaysia's Astro On Demand on September 19, 2016, airing Monday through Sunday during its 9:30-10:30 pm timeslot and concluding October 16, 2016 with a total of 28 episodes.

Law dis-Order centred around the office politics of a prestigious Hong Kong law firm. Liu Kai-chi played KC Lau (劉謹昌) and Alex Fong played Kent Cheung (張強), both are powerful attorneys struggling to become the main authority at the law firm they both work at.

In memorial of Liu Kai-chi, this drama aired again from 31 March 2021 in the midnight time slot.

== Synopsis ==
As the co-founder of the Chinese law firm Donald & Co., Charles Cheuk (Lau Dan), has been a chairman of its committee for many years. Though he had promised his managing partner KC Lau (Liu Kai-chi) that he would step down, Charles hires the money-minded lawyer Kent Cheung (Alex Fong) as a new partner for the firm, hoping that he would be able to counterbalance KC's growing obsession for authority.

KC had built up great influence in his years with Donald & Co. His associates include the abled lawyers Duncan Yam (Raymond Cho) and Martha Fong (Mandy Wong). With Patricia Lee (Florence Kwok) and Nick Chau (Matthew Ho) as Kent's only strongsuits, KC assumed he had the upper edge in their game of power.

However, a traffic accident catches KC off guard, and Kent takes advantage of the situation. He gets himself a lucrative offer from Charles, who promotes Kent to senior partner. During this time, Kent re-encounters assistant solicitor Hazel Cheuk (Ali Lee), and they develop a close mentor-student friendship.

Feeling his power ebbing away, KC becomes a ticking time bomb, ready to explode at any moment. But while fighting for control, a toothless tiger comes out from under the radar, ready to seek revenge.

== Cast and characters ==
=== Donald & Co. Law firm ===
- Lau Dan as Charles Cheuk Kai-yiu (卓繼堯)
- Chung King-fai as Henry Ching Yat-hong (程日匡)
- Liu Kai-chi as KC Lau Kan-cheung (劉謹昌)
- Alex Fong Chung-shun as Kent Cheung Keung (張強)
- Ali Lee as Hazel Cheuk Yi-chung (卓宜中)
- Mandy Wong as Martha Fong Ning (方寧)
- Raymond Cho as Duncan Yam Wai-leung (任偉樑)
- Florence Kwok as Patricia Lee Siu-wah (李少樺)
- Matthew Ho as Nick Chow Lik-hang (周力行)
- Kelly Cheung as Libby Poon Hei-man (潘希文)
- Chan Wing-chun as KK Tsang Ka-kit (曾家健)
- Henry Yu as YT Leung Yiu-tin (梁耀天)
- Koo Koon-chung as Don Sum Lap-ho (沈立豪)
- Yeewan Ho as Sandy Tse Hong-yee (謝康兒)
- Jones Lee as Ben Kwong chung-yiu (鄺忠耀)
- Mandy Lam as Elsa Law Pui-yu (羅貝如)
- Ng Kwong-lee as Ivan Chiu Chi-pong (招志邦)
- Daniel Chau as Jason Tong Ka-kit (湯家健)
- Osanna Chiu as Helen Sin Wai-shan (冼慧珊)
- Doris Chow as Zita Ha Ting (夏婷)
- Athena Ng as Ceci Kwok Sze-wan (郭思韻)
- Kitterick Yiu as Sam Au Chi-sum (歐智琛)
- Joey Mak as Eva Shek Wing-yin (石穎妍)

=== Extended cast ===
- Becky Lee as Mary Wong Wing-lam (汪穎琳)
- Ram Chiang as Michael Yip Ho-tin (葉浩天)
- Griselda Yeung as Danielle Lok Sze-wai (駱思慧)

== Soundtrack ==
The main opening theme song "Choice of Justice" (公義的抉擇) was sung by Hubert Wu, composed by Alan Cheung and lyrics by Hayes Yeung. A sub theme song named "Can You See" performed by Kayee Tam, and also composed by Dominic Chu, with lyrics by Wayne James was played during the closing credits on some episodes.

Track listing

No.	Title	Lyrics	Music	Singer(s)	Length
1.	"Choice of Justice" (公義的抉擇)	Hayes Yeung	Alan Cheung	Hubert Wu	3:12
2.	"Can You See"	Wayne James	Dominic Chu	Kayee Tam	3:13

== Development and production ==
- In October 2015, Alex Fong announced that he would take a break from mainland China projects to film a drama for TVB as he was personally invited by producer Marco Law to film the drama and looked forward to working with Liu Kai-chi.
- It was announced in early November 2016 that veteran Hong Kong actor Liu Kai-chi would be returning to TVB after a long absence with the television station to film a drama. Liu's last TVB drama was 2007s The Winter Melon Tale (大冬瓜).
- The costume fitting ceremony was held on November 30, 2015, 12:30 pm at Tseung Kwan O TVB City Studio One Common Room.
- The blessing ceremony was held on January 4, 2016.
- Filming took place from December 2015 till March 2016, entirely on location in Hong Kong.

== Viewership ratings ==
Timeslot (HKT)	#	Day(s)	Week	Episode(s)	Average points	Peaking points
Mon - Sun (9:30-10:30 pm); 21:30–22:30	1	Mon - Fri	19 – 23 Sep 2016	1 — 5	23.3	26
Mon - Sun (9:30-10:30 pm); 21:30–22:30	1	Sat	24 Sep 2016	6	22	--
Mon - Sun (9:30-10:30 pm); 21:30–22:30	1	Sun	25 Sep 2016	7	22	--
Mon - Sun (9:30-10:30 pm); 21:30–22:30	2	Mon - Fri	26–30 Sep 2016	8 — 12	21.8	--
Mon - Sun (9:30-10:30 pm); 21:30–22:30	2	Sat	01 Oct 2016	13	17.9	--
Mon - Sun (9:30-10:30 pm); 21:30–22:30	2	Sun	02 Oct 2016	14	19.4	--
Mon - Sun (9:30-10:30 pm); 21:30–22:30	3	Mon - Fri	03–07 Oct 2016	15 — 19		
Mon - Sun (9:30-10:30 pm); 21:30–22:30	3	Sat	08 Oct 2016	20		
Mon - Sun (9:30-10:30 pm); 21:30–22:30	3	Sun	09 Oct 2016	21		
Mon - Sun (9:30-10:30 pm); 21:30–22:30	3	Mon - Fri	10–14 Oct 2016	22 — 26		
Mon - Sun (9:30-10:30 pm); 21:30–22:30	3	Sun	16 Oct 2016	27 — 28		
Total average						

October 15, 2016: No episode broadcast.

== Awards ==
Year	Ceremony	Category	Nominee	Result
2016	StarHub TVB Awards	My Favourite TVB Characters	Mandy Wong — "Fong Ning (Martha)"	Won
2016	StarHub TVB Awards	Most Improved Female Artiste	Ali Lee	Won
2016	TVB Star Awards Malaysia	Top 15 Favourite TVB Characters	Mandy Wong — "Fong Ning (Martha)"	Won
2016	TVB Star Awards Malaysia	Top 15 Favourite TVB Characters	Ali Lee — "Cheuk Yi-chung (Hazel)"	Won
2016	TVB Anniversary Awards	Most Improved Female Artiste	Ali Lee	Won

== International broadcast ==
- Malaysia - 8TV (Malaysia)
