= Angelina Lo =

Hong Kong actress (born 1953)

Angelina Lo Yuen Yen
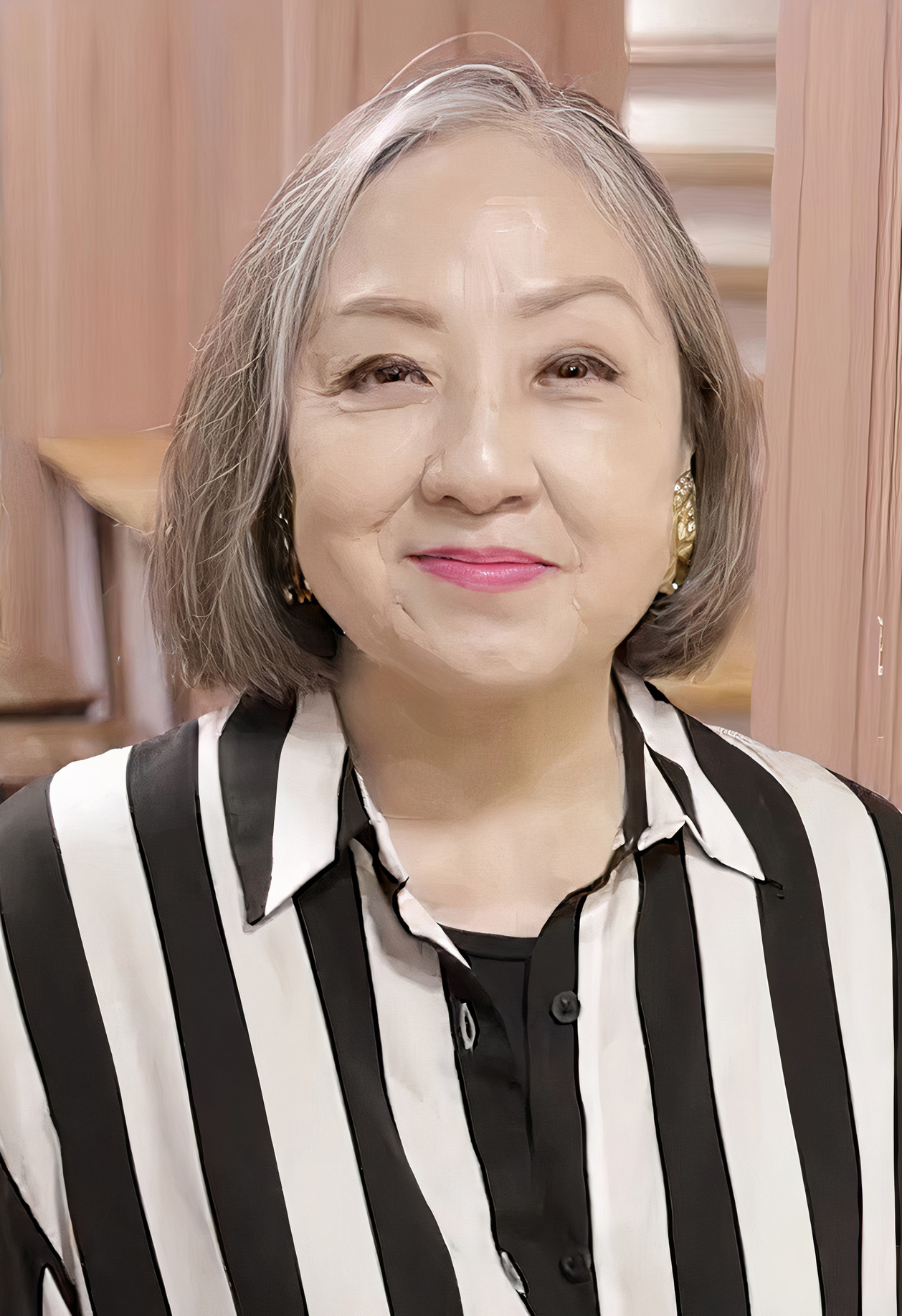
- Born: March 15, 1953 (age 73)

Angelina Lo (盧宛茵; Lo Yuen Yen) is a semi-retired veteran Hong Kong actor noted for her five decade career and frequent appearances in television sitcom roles.

Lo was born in Hong Kong in 1953. In 1973, she entered the television industry after taking an actor training course at TVB.

She began appearing in television sitcoms at the end of her course, appearing first in "The Grudge of the Rich Family" (朱門怨). Lo is noted for playing mother and grandmother roles, and is known as "Madam" or "Queen Mother" to her fans. She has appeared in Of Greed and Ants on TVB.
