= FAMA =

Hip hop duo from Hong Kong

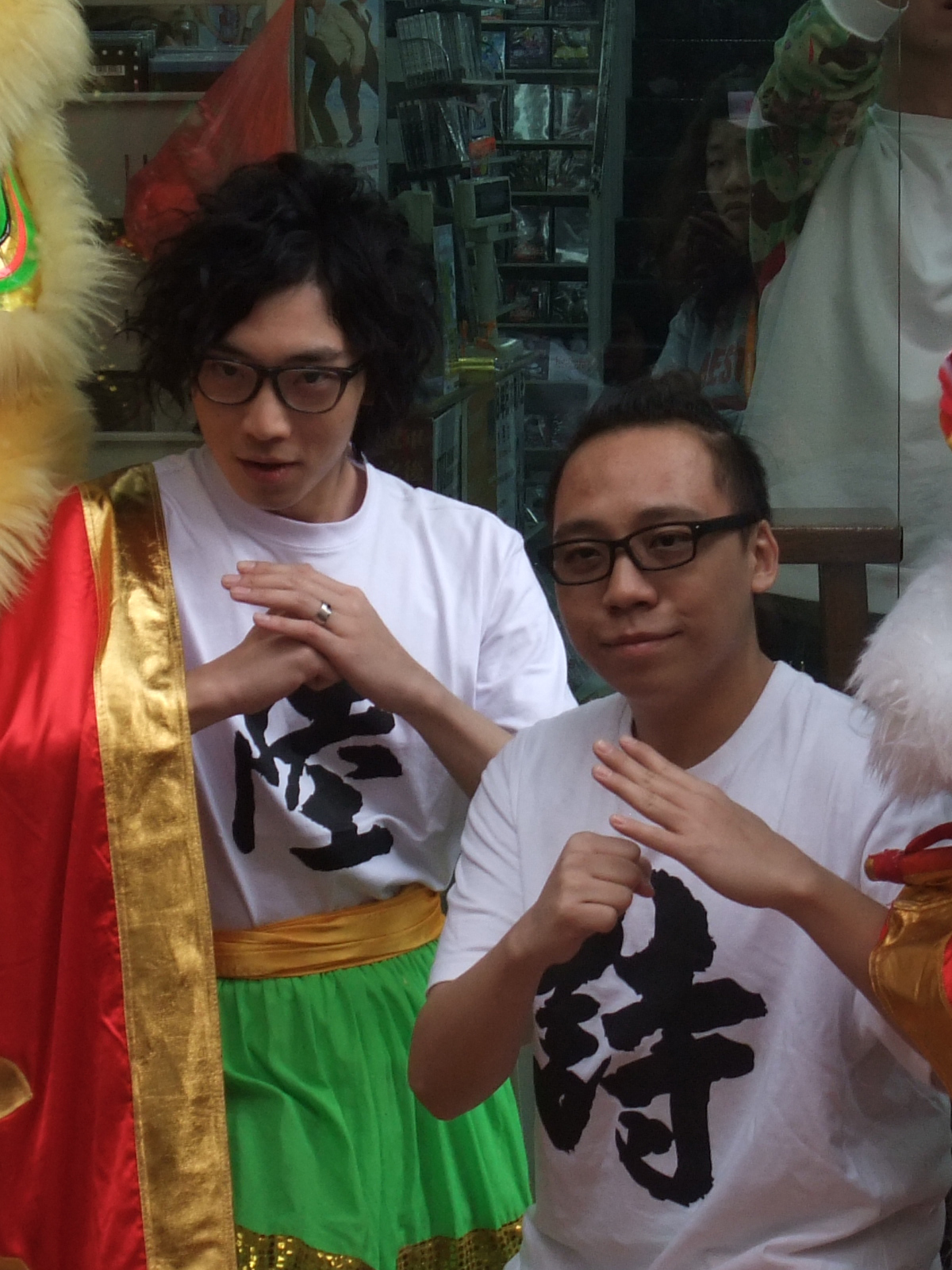
- Born: Hong Kong
- Occupation(s): Rappers, songwriters, actors, television presenter
- Years active: 2000–present
- Agent(s): TG Management Company Limited, TVB

Chinese name
- Traditional Chinese: 農夫
- Simplified Chinese: 农夫
Transcriptions
Standard Mandarin
- Hanyu Pinyin: nóng fū
Yue: Cantonese
- Jyutping: nung4 fu1
- Musical career
- Origin: Hong Kong
- Genres: Hong Kong hip hop
- Labels: TG Management
- Members: C-Kwan and 6-Wing
- Website: Official website

FAMA (Chinese: 農夫) is a Hong Kong hip hop duo consisting of members C Kwan and Luk Wing (6-Wing). Formed in 2002, the duo have since released ten studio albums and EPs. Known for their quick-wit and humour, along with the use of lyrics and music to reflect Hong Kong's society and culture, C Kwan and 6 Wing have also found success as television hosts and actors. They also have been associated with other musicians and bands, such as Edison Chen, Joey Yung, JJ Lin, Khalil Fong, HotCha and many more.

== Name of origin ==
FAMA originates from a similar sounding word in Cantonese, which fully translates to farmer. The official explanation for "FAMA" meant that farmers plant seeds and grow crops for food. The first word, "農"(nong), meaning farming/cultivation, originates from China. Kwan and Wing hope to aspire spreading seeds (music and culture) across Asian countries and the world, as well as local roots in Hong Kong. The duo's goal is "One Asia for all Asians", and from their own perspective, promote their body of work through current social affairs/trends, life, attitude, love, sex, hip hop and much more.

In an interview, Kwan and Wing stated the real reason they got their name "FAMA" because they saw a person wearing folded wide pants which looked similar to a farmer while hanging with friends on the streets. After laughing at the looks, Kwan and Wing decided to take up the name "FAMA" because it was easy to remember and represented the grassroots.

== History ==
Kwan and Wing were high school schoolmates. The two were previously part of a five-member underground rap metal band known as System Map. After winning a band competition, they formed a four-member rap group with DJ蠟筆 and GiGi 聶碧芝 (the group's lead vocals) to create FAMA. By July 2002, DJ蠟筆 had left the group, FAMA had a record deal with DJ Tommy and began creating music with DJ Galaxy. 6 Wing recalls recording songs in DJ Tommy's kitchen. FAMA released their debut studio album Poem O' Da Moon 月下思 on 8 November 2002. Their second studio album Cheng Wing Gi 鄭永芝 was released 4 April 2005. By 2006, GiGi had left the group.

In 2006, FAMA released the single "456Wing", which received strong airplay on mainstream local radio stations. The song is a single by 6 Wing about his determination to keep rapping despite poor economic circumstances. Their third studio album Music Tycoon was released October 20.

In 2007, FAMA reached mainstream popularity with the single "Wing and Water Rising" 風生水起 featuring Feng Shui master Mak Ling Ling. That year they won My Favourite Group and Best Group Gold Prize at the Ultimate Song Chart Awards Presentation.

FAMA was listed as the most popular group in the Hong Kong 2008 Jade Solid Gold Top 10 Awards. They also won an award for having one of the most popular songs in the 2008 RTHK Top 10 Gold Songs Awards.

Since the last decade, FAMA has collaborated with famous actress and host, Carol Cheng on many occasions, where they bring humor into different situations across various variety shows and have since been ingrained with audiences and is popular with Hong Kong culture.

== Members ==
The two members of the group are Luk Wing (6永) and C Kwan (C君). Their manager is DJ Tommy, who has been their representative since 2004. FAMA joined DJ Tommy's TG Management group in 2011.

== Discography ==
- Poem O' Da Moon 月下思 (2002)
- Cheng Wing Gi 鄭永芝 (2005)
- Music Tycoon 音樂大亨 (2006)
- 風生水起 (2007)
- New Song + Best Collection 農夫舉高隻手舊愛新歡全紀錄 (2008)
- 富甲天下 (2008)
- O'Fama (2010)
- Miracle 奇蹟 (2010)
- Double Happiness 雙囍臨門 (2012)
- If You Don't Have It Now, You Will Have It Real Soon 你而家無，但係將來會有(上) (2015)
- If You Don't Have It Now, You Will Have It Real Soon II 你而家無， 但係將來會有(下) (2016)
