= List of TVB dramas in 2019 =

This is a list of television serial dramas released by TVB in 2019, including highest-rated television dramas and award ceremonies.

== Top ten drama series in ratings ==
The following is a list of TVB's top serial dramas in 2019 by viewership ratings. The recorded ratings include premiere week, final week, finale episode, and the average overall count of live Hong Kong viewers (in millions).

Highest-rated drama series of 2019
| Rank | English title | Chinese title | Average | Peak | Premiere week | Final week | Series finale | HK viewers (millions) |
|---|---|---|---|---|---|---|---|---|
| 1 | The Defected | 鐵探 | 29 | 33 | 28 | 31 | 33 | 1.87 |
| 2 | Big White Duel | 白色強人 | 29 | 32 | 28 | 31 | 32.7 | 1.87 |
| 3 | Barrack O'Karma | 金宵大廈 | 27 | 31.1 | 25 | 29 | 29.8 | 1.80 |
| 4 | Wonder Women | 多功能老婆 | 26 | 28.7 | 25 | 26 | 28.7 | 1.70 |
| 5 | Finding Her Voice | 牛下女高音 | 26 | 30.7 | 26 | 28 | 30.7 | 1.70 |
| 6 | The Man Who Kills Troubles | 解決師 | 26 | 26.9 | 26 | 25 | 26.1 | 1.70 |
| 7 | Guardian Angel | 守護神之保險調查 | 25 | 26 | 24 | 26 | 26 | 1.65 |
| 8 | Our Unwinding Ethos | 十二傳說 | 24 | 28.2 | 26 | 24 | 24.7 | 1.60 |
| 9 | I Bet Your Pardon | 荷里活有個大老千 | 24 | 26.3 | 24 | 26 | 26.3 | 1.60 |
| 10 | As Time Goes By | 好日子 | 24 | 26.9 | 25 | 24 | 24 | 1.60 |

== Awards ==
| Category/Organization | TVB Anniversary Awards 12 Jan 2020 |
|---|---|
| Best Drama | Big White Duel |
| Best Actor | Kenneth Ma; Big White Duel |
| Best Actress | Kara Wai; The Defected |
| Most Popular Male Character | Pakho Chau; Wonder Women |
| Most Popular Female Character | Selena Lee; Barrack O'Karma; Miriam Yeung; Wonder Women |
| Best Supporting Actor | Kalok Chow; Come Home Love: Lo and Behold |
| Best Supporting Actress | Candice Chiu; Barrack O'Karma |
| Most Improved Actor | Owen Cheung; Finding Her Voice |
| Most Improved Actress | Kelly Cheung; Big White Duel |
| Best Theme Song | Wonder Women - Free my love (讓愛高飛) by Pakho Chau |
| Most Popular On-Screen Couple or Partnership | Joel Chan & Selena Lee; Barrack O'Karma |

== First line-up ==
These dramas air in Hong Kong from 8:00pm to 8:30pm, Monday to Friday on Jade.

| Broadcast | English title (Chinese title) | Eps. | Cast and crew | Theme song(s) | Avg. rating | Genre | Ref. |
|---|---|---|---|---|---|---|---|
| (from 2018); 20 Feb– 7 Aug 2026 (to 2020) | Come Home Love: Lo and Behold 愛·回家之開心速遞 | 2868 | Sandy Shaw, Law Chun-ngok (producers); Ma Chun-ying, Lee Yi-wah, Yuen Bo-wai (writers); Lau Dan, Pal Sinn, Angela Tong, Koni Lui, Andrew Chan, Andrea So, Veronica Shiu, Joyce Tang, Kalok Chow, Law Lok-lam, Geoffrey Wong, Mark Ma, Ricco Ng, Hoffman Cheng, Mandy Lam, Kim Li | "Latin Soul Strut" "在心中" (Within the Heart) by Jacqueline Wong "開心速遞” (Happy courier) by 群星合唱 | TBA | Sitcom, Supernatural | |

== Second line-up ==
These dramas air in Hong Kong from 8:30pm to 9:30pm, Monday to Friday on Jade.

Remark: Starting on 19 Jan 2019 from 8:30 p.m to 10:30 p.m, with two back-to-back episode until 30 Mar 2019 only on Jade.

Background shading indicates dramas not produced by TVB.

| Broadcast | English title (Chinese title) | Eps. | Cast and crew | Theme song(s) | Avg. rating | Genre | Ref. |
|---|---|---|---|---|---|---|---|
| (from 2018); 24 Dec- 02 Feb | Guardian Angel 守護神之保險調查 | 36 | Virginia Lok, Chung Shu-Kai (producers); Michael Miu, Bosco Wong, Annie Liu, Kate Tsui, Hui Shiu-hung, Irene Wan, Philip Keung, Alex Lam, Hugo Ng, Maggie Siu, MC Jin, Evergreen Mak, Akina Hong, Angie Cheong, Mimi Kung, Hedwig Tam, Ai Wai, Johnny Ngan, Deon Cheung, Stephanie Au, Louis Yan, Jermey Xu, Zhai Tian Lin, Hai Lu, Kent Tong, Paw Hee-ching | 世世 (Worldly) by A-Lin, 另一種開始 (Another Start) by Isabelle Huang, 守護人 (Guardian) by James Ng | 25 | Crime drama | |
| 04 Feb- 14 Apr | The Legend of Haolan 皓镧传 | 62 | Li Dachao (director); Er Di (writer); Tatchiu Lee (film director); Yu Zheng (executive producer); Wu Jinyan, Nie Yuan, Mao Zijun, Ning Jing, Tan Zhuo, Hai Ling, Wang Zhi Fei, Tong Meng Shi, Jiang Zi Xin, Wang Lin, He Jiayi, Yiqin Zhao, Lian Shumei | 心有不甘 (Unwilling) by Hana Kuk | 24 | Historical Period Drama, Wuxia | |
| 15 Apr- 21 Jun | Heavenly Sword and Dragon Slaying Saber 倚天屠龍記 | 50 | Jiang Jiajun (director); Luo Rujia (executive producer); Joseph Zeng, Chen Yuqi, Zhu Xudan, Kathy Chow, Fan Siu-Wong | 得失一笑中 (Reclusion) by Brian Tse | 26 | Historical Period Drama, Wuxia | |
| 24 Jun- 19 July | As Time Goes By 好日子 | 20 | Poon Ka-tak (producer); Chan Kam-ling, Choi Shuk-yin (writers); Ben Wong, Alice Chan, Max Cheung, Stephanie Che, William Chak, Brian Chu, Jessica Kan, Stitch Yu, Joseph Lee, Gigi Wong | 有你多好 (A Good Time) by Kayee Tam, Auston Lam, Alvin Ng | 24 | Romantic comedy | |
| 22 July- 30 Aug | Justice Bao: The First Year 包青天再起風雲 | 30 | Chong Wai-kin (producer); Kwan Chung-ling (writer); Shaun Tam, Nancy Wu, Raymond Cho, Elaine Yiu, Owen Cheung, Grace Chan, Roxanne Tong, Oscar Li, Alan Tam Kwan Lun, Jonathan Lee, Darren Wong, Jonathan Cheung, Rosanne Lui, KK Cheung, Li Shing-cheong, Frankie Choi, Kelly Fu, Yoyo Chen, Carlo Ng | 明月 (The brightness of my heart) by Joey Yung | 23 | Historical period drama | |
| 02 Sept- 04 Oct | My Life As Loan Shark 街坊財爺 | 25 | Leung Choi Yuen (producer); Siu Chi Lam (writer); Kent Cheng, Kingdom Yuen, Lai Lok-yi, Mandy Wong, Maggie Shiu, James Ng, Jack Hui, Lesley Chiang, Andrew Yuen Man-kit, Stephen Wong Ka-lok, Helen Ma | 街坊財爺 (God of Wealth) by James Ng 愛情無價 (Love is priceless) by Jinny Ng | 24 | Drama, Comedy | |
| 07 Oct- 15 Nov | Finding Her Voice 牛下女高音 | 30 | Wong Wai Sing (producer); Loong Man-Hong (writer); Chung King-fai, Hugo Ng, Mimi Kung, Owen Cheung, Jacqueline Wong, Ram Chiang, Jimmy Au, Savio Tsang, Willie Wai, Sam Tsang, Joe Tay, Lo Koon Lan, Stephanie Che, Stephanie Ho, Virginia Lau | 我會想念他 (Thoughts of Love) by Stephanie Ho 你比我重要 (Until the End) by Hugo Ng | 26 | Comedy, Drama | |
| 18 Nov- 3 Jan (to 2020) | Legend of the Phoenix 凤弈 | 34 | Fang Fang, Yu Haiyan (executive producer); Zhang Huabiao (writer); Wei Hantao (director); Viva He Hong Shan, Jeremy Tsui, Cao Xiwen, Wayne Lai | Be brave (逆光飛翔) by Hana Luk | 26 | Historical period drama | |

== Third line-up ==
These dramas air in Hong Kong from 9:30pm to 10:30pm, Monday to Friday on Jade.

| Broadcast | English title (Chinese title) | Eps. | Cast and crew | Theme song(s) | Avg. rating | Genre | Ref. |
|---|---|---|---|---|---|---|---|
| (from 2018); 03 Dec - 11 Jan | The Learning Curve of a Warlord 大帥哥 | 30 | Steven Tsui (producer); Lau Choi-wan, Chan Kei, Ruby Law Pui-ching (writers); Dicky Cheung, Tony Hung, Sisley Choi, Raymond Cho, Vivien Yeo, Tsui Wing, Oscar Li, Jessica Kan, Zoie Tam, Choi Kwok-hing, Gary Chan, Jerry Ku, Max Cheung, Eddie Pang, Dickson Li, Virginia Lau, John Chan, Keith Mok, Celine Ma | Bravery (大無畏) & Our Romance (蜜運) by Dicky Cheung | 28 | Period drama, Comedy | |
| 14 Jan - 23 Feb | I Bet Your Pardon 荷里活有個大老千 | 30 | Wong Jing (producer); Philip Lui, Lee Chi-Chung (writers); Lui Koon Nam, Steve Cheng (screenwriters); Kent Cheng, Paul Chun, Elaine Jin, Dominic Ho, Selena Li, Kent Tong, Dada Wong, Angie Cheong, James Ng, Babyjohn Choi, Connie Man, Akina Hong, Edward Ma, Jacquelin Ch’ng, Winnie Leung, Virginia Lau, Bonnie Chan, Susan Tse, Joan Lee, Russell Cheung, Leo Tsang, Chun Wong, Owen Ng, Tsoi Kwok Hing, Helen Ma, Parkman Wong, Wong Shee Tong, Moses Cheng, Joseph Yeung, Louis Szeto | 荷里活有個大老千 (I Bet Your Pardon) by Wan Kwong | 24 | Period drama, Trendy, Comedy | |
| 25 Feb - 29 Mar | The Ghetto-Fabulous Lady 福爾摩師奶 | 25 | Dave Fong (producer); Yung Sin-ying (writer); Adia Chan, Ben Wong, Alice Chan, Tsui Wing, Kaman Kong, Jeannie Chan, Dickson Yu, Gilbert Lam, Joe Cheng, Griselda Yeung, John Chan, Angelina Lo, Rainbow Ching, Brian Thomas Burrell, Barry Cox, David Do | 暗中愛我 (Secret Love) by Jinny Ng 有我便有你 (Always be with you) by Adia Chan | 24 | Period drama, Mystery | |
| 01 Apr - 10 May | The Defected 鐵探 | 30 | So Man Chung, Carmen So (producers); Chu King-kei, Lau Siu-kwan (writers); Kara Wai, Benjamin Yuen, Philip Keung, Ben Wong, Mat Yeung, Sisley Choi, Grace Wong, Gloria Tang, Oscar Leung, Hui Shiu Hung, Shek Sau, Sharon Chan, Brian Tse, Berg Ng, Lam Lei, Geoffrey Wong, Otto Chan, Lee Shing-cheong | 鐵石心腸 (Hardhearted) by Fred Cheng 鋼鐵有淚 (I Finally Cried) by Hana Kuk, 我記得 (I remember) by Jinny Ng | 29 | Crime drama, Action, Police | |
| 13 May - 07 Jun | My Commissioned Lover 婚姻合伙人 | 20 | Poon Ka-tak (producer); Chan Kam-ling, Lui Sau Lin (writers); Mat Yeung, Samantha Ko, Kenny Wong, Gigi Wong, Billy Luk, Kirby Lam, Roxanne Tong, Jerry Ku, Kayi Cheung, Henry Lo, Jack Hui | 抱擁情人 (Sweet Days) by Hubert Wu | 24 | Romantic comedy, Drama | |
| 10 Jun - 12 July | Big White Duel 白色強人 | 25 | Marco Law (producer); Wong Wai-keung (writer); Roger Kwok, Kenneth Ma, Natalie Tong, Ali Lee, Matthew Ho, Kelly Cheung, John Chiang, Ram Chiang, Crystal Fung, Ashley Chu, Stephen Wong Ka Lok, Gary Tam, Willie Wai, Bobo Wong, Aurora Li, Marco Kwok, Lily Poon, Max Cheung, Timothy Cheng, Mark Ma Kwun Tung, Yao Bin | 選擇善良 (Choice) by Fred Cheng, 沒有你開始 (Without you) by Hana Kuk, Can You Hear by Kayee Tam | 29 | Medical Drama | |
| 15 July - 16 Aug | Our Unwinding Ethos 十二傳說 | 25 | Wong Wai Sing (producer); Steffie Lai (writer); Chung Kwong Keung (director); Edwin Siu, Rosina Lam, Jonathan Cheung, Moon Lau, Jazz Lam, Jimmy Au Siu Wai, Angel Chiang, Lau Kong, Yin San Lai, Mary Hon, To Yin Gor, Lily Poon, Kirby Lam, Stephen Wong Ka Lok, Gary Tam, Candice Chiu, David Do, Derek Wong, Stefan Wong | 傳說 (Rumors) by Auston Lam | 24 | Urban Legend, Paranormal, Mystery, Drama | |
| 19 Aug - 13 Sep | Girlie Days 她她她的少女時代 | 20 | Liu Chun Shek (producer); Wong Bing-yee, Kaho Lee (writers); Kristal Tin, Raymond Cho, Johnson Lee, Joseph Lee, Claire Yiu, Iris Lam, Willie Wai, Joey Law, Andrew Yuen Man-kit, Stitch Yu, Serene Lim, Bowie Wu, Glen Lee | 少年時代 (Keep fighting on) by Daniel Chau 當天風雨 (Ups and downs) by Andy Ho | 21 | Romantic comedy, Drama | |
| 16 Sep - 13 Oct | Barrack O'Karma 金宵大廈 | 20 | Yip Chun-Fai (producer); Ruby Law Pui-ching (writer); Selena Li, Joel Chan, Samantha Ko, Kelly Cheung, Zoie Tam, Stefan Wong, Jazz Lam, Rosina Lam, Candice Chiu, Gloria Tang, Akina Hong, Lau Kong, Bob Cheung, 6 Wing, Lily Li, Ou-Yang Hau Ying, Fanny Ip | 今宵多珍重 (Goodbye) by Kayee Tam 今宵多珍重 (Goodbye - Mandarin version) by Vivian Koo | 27 | Mystery, Drama, Paranormal | |
| 14 Oct - 23 Nov | The Man Who Kills Troubles 解決師 | 30 | Lau Ka-ho (producer); Nelson Cheung (director); Leong Man-wah (writer); Vincent Wong, Natalie Tong, Sharon Chan, Kelly Cheung, Crystal Fung, Jonathan Cheung, Eric Li, Nora Miao, Bianca Wu, Jacquelin Ch'ng, Pinky Cheung, Stephen Wong Ka-lok, Ha Yu, Michael Tong, Ling Mak, Carlo Ng, Jim Ping Hei, Helena Law, Suey Kwok, Wiyona Yeung | 天知 (We know) by On Chan, Andy Leung 愛不起 (Unaffordable) by Vincent Wong | 26 | Crime drama | |
| 25 Nov - 27 Dec | Wonder Women 多功能老婆 | 25 | Ella Chan (producer); Tong Kin-ping (writer); Poon Man Kit (director); Miriam Yeung, Pakho Chau, Raymond Wong Ho-yin, Alice Chan, Tony Hung, Rebecca Zhu, Jonathan Wong, Andrew Yuen Man-kit, Maggie Yu, Lily Leung, KK Cheung, Lai Yin Shan Eva, Hui Shiu-hung, Melvin Wong, Nora Miao, Celine Ma, Toby Chan, William Hu | Destination of love (嫁給愛情) by Miriam Yeung, Free my love (讓愛高飛) by Pakho Chau, Always wrong (每段愛還是錯) by Jinny Ng Break up before sunrise (天光前分手) by Joey Thye | 26 | Romantic Comedy | |
| 30 Dec - 17 Jan (to 2020) | Handmaidens United 丫鬟大聯盟 | 15 | Au Yiu-Hing (producer); Lau Chi-Wah (writer); Tony Hung, Jacqueline Wong, Roxanne Tong, Brian Tse, Timothy Cheng, Pat Poon, Florence Kwok, Lisa Lau, Angie Cheong | Brave for you (想勇敢一次) by Kayee Tam | 20 | Historical Period Drama | |

== Weekend dramas ==
These dramas air in Hong Kong from 8:30 pm to 10:30 pm, with two back-to-back episodes Sunday on Jade.

Starting on 6 April 2019 until 4 May 2019 from 9:30 pm to 10:30 pm, Saturday on Jade.

Starting on 01 Jun 2019 until 27 July 2019 from 8:30 pm to 10:30 pm, with two back-to-back episodes Saturday on Jade

Starting on 03 Aug 2019 has rescheduled from 11:50 pm to 2:05 am with two back-to-back episodes Saturday and Sunday on Jade

Background shading indicates dramas not produced by TVB.

| Broadcast | English title (Chinese title) | Eps. | Cast and crew | Theme song(s) | Avg. rating | Genre | Notes | Official website |
|---|---|---|---|---|---|---|---|---|
| (from 2018); 25 Nov– 13 Jan | Wife Interrupted 救妻同學會 | 8 | Kwan Shu Ming (producer); Sin-Siu Ling (writer); Hubert Wu, Moon Lau, Ashley Chu, Alvin Ng, Wong Mei-Ki, Telford Wong, Virginia Lau, Jarryd Tam, Rainky Wai, Kyle Li, Jessica Kan, Stitch Yu, Arnold Kwok, Alycia Chan, Andrew Yuen Man-kit, Eileen Yeow | Taking Chances (為愛冒險) by Hubert Wu; Missed (太難開始) by Hubert Wu; Amazing Grace by Kayee Tam | 14 | Trendy Drama | | |
| 06 Apr- 4 May | ICAC Investigators 2019 廉政行動 | 5 | Catherine Tsang, Dante Lam (producers); Jeannie Chan, Carlos Chan, Joyce Tang, Ben Wong, Geoffrey Albert Wong, Leo Kwan, Joey Law, Nuet Nay, Harriet Yeung, Dada Wong, Winki Lai, Tony Hung, Kent Cheng, Tsui Wing, Raymond Cho, Eric Cheng Kai Tai, Jack Wu, Pierre Ngo, Lau Kong, Jerry Ku | ICAC Investigators Theme | 17.4 | Police procedural | | |
| 01 Jun- 27 July & 03 Aug- 21 Sep | The Family 幸福一家人 | 32 | Fung Kai (director); Wenliang Zhang, Jun Ni (screenwriters); Dong Jie, Zhai Tianlin, Lee Li-Chun, Qiu Ze, Ko Lei, Linda Liu | The fortunate one (幸运儿) by Johnny Ku | 14.5 | Family drama | | |
