= List of TVB dramas in 2018 =

This is a list of television serial dramas released by TVB in 2018, including highest-rated television dramas and award ceremonies.

== Top ten drama series in ratings ==
The following is a list of TVB's top serial dramas in 2018 by viewership ratings. The recorded ratings include premiere week, final week, finale episode, and the average overall count of live Hong Kong viewers (in millions).

Highest-rated drama series of 2018
Rank	English title	Chinese title	Average	Peak	Premiere week	Final week	Series finale	HK viewers (millions)
1	Life on the Line	跳躍生命線	29.3	31	27	31	34	1.87
2	Deep in the Realm of Conscience	宮心計2: 深宮計	28.6	35.6	28	31	29	1.80
3	Who Wants a Baby?	BB來了	28.1	30	29	28	30	1.84
4	The Learning Curve of a Warlord	大帥哥	27.7	33	29	28	30	1.84
5	Fist Fight	兄弟	27	30	28	28	28	1.77
6	Daddy Cool	逆緣	27	31	28	28	30	1.77
7	The Forgotten Valley	平安谷之詭谷傳說	27	30	27	27	28	1.77
8	Apple-colada	果欄中的江湖大嫂	26	29	27	27	28	1.70
9	Flying Tiger	飛虎之潛行極戰	26	29	26	25	18	1.70
10	Come Home Love: Lo And Behold	爱回家之开心速递	26	29	26	-	-	1.70

== Awards ==
Category/Organization	TVB Anniversary Awards 16 December 2018
Best Drama	Life on the Line
Best Actor	Joe Ma; Life on the Line
Best Actress	Ali Lee; Who Wants A Baby
Best Supporting Actor	Oscar Leung; OMG, Your Honour
Best Supporting Actress	Mandy Lam; Come Home Love: Lo and Behold
Most Improved Actor	Matthew Ho; Life on the Line, Apple-colada & Succession War
Most Improved Actress	Crystal Fung; Apple-colada
Best Theme Song	Life on the Line - Last forever by Hana Kuk
Most Popular On-Screen Couple or Partnership	Edwin Siu & Raymond Cho; Two Men In A Kitchen

== First line-up ==
These dramas air in Hong Kong from 8:00pm to 8:30pm, Monday to Friday on Jade.

Broadcast	English title (Chinese title)	Eps.	Cast and crew	Theme song(s)	Avg. rating	Genre	Ref.
(from 2017); 20 Feb– 7 Aug 2026 (to 2019)	Come Home Love: Lo and Behold 愛·回家之開心速遞	2868	Sandy Shaw, Law Chun-ngok (producers); Ma Chun-ying, Lee Yi-wah, Yuen Bo-wai (writers); Lau Dan, Pal Sinn, Angela Tong, Koni Lui, Andrew Chan, Andrea So, Veronica Shiu, Joyce Tang, Kalok Chow, Law Lok-lam, Geoffrey Wong, Mark Ma, Ricco Ng, Hoffman Cheng, Mandy Lam, Kim Li, Eileen Yeow	"Latin Soul Strut" "在心中" (Within the Heart) by Jacqueline Wong	TBA	Sitcom, Supernatural	

== Second line-up ==
These dramas air in Hong Kong from 8:30pm to 9:30pm, Monday to Friday on Jade.

Background shading indicates dramas not produced by TVB.

Broadcast	English title (Chinese title)	Eps.	Cast and crew	Theme song(s)	Avg. rating	Genre	Ref.
(from 2017); 06 Nov– 12 Jan	My Ages Apart 誇世代	50	Joe Chan (producer); Kwan Chung-ling, Cheng Sing-mo (writer); Bobby Au-yeung, Moses Chan, Louis Cheung, Kristal Tin, Ali Lee, Maggie Shiu, Hui Shiu-hung, Eddie Kwan, Sammy Leung, Elena Kong, Katy Kung, David Chiang, James Ng, Anjaylia Chan, Louisa Mak, Hubert Wu, Angel Chiang, Zoie Tam, Kaman Kong, Dickson Yu, Mimi Chu, Mary Hon, Amy Fan	My Ages Apart (誇世代) by Hacken Lee Do Not Remember Anymore (別再記起) by Jinny Ng	24	Comedy drama	
15 Jan– 09 Feb	The Forgotten Valley 平安谷之詭谷傳說	20	Andy Chan (producer); Tong Kin-ping, Choi Shuk-yin (writers); Raymond Wong Ho-yin, Louisa So, Grace Chan, Katy Kung, Lau Kong, Louis Yuen, Rebecca Zhu, Zoie Tam, Jess Sum, Toby Chan, Cilla Kung, Jessica Kan, Timothy Cheng	"半邊天" (Hope up the sky) by Bianca Wu	27	Period drama, Suspense	
12 Feb– 03 Mar	Watch Out, Boss 波士早晨	15	Kwan Wing-chung (producer); Chung Yeuk-sze (writer); Flora Chan, Ben Wong, Amy Fan, Candice Chiu, Waise Lee, Tony Hung, Ali Lee, Jessica Kan, Joe Junior, Steven Cheung Chi-hang	"找個離開你的理由" (Finding a reason to leave you) by Jinny Ng	24	Comedy	
05 Mar- 30 Mar	Birth of a Hero 翻生武林	20	Au Yiu-hing (producer); Wong Bing-yee, Tong Kin-ping (writers); Edwin Siu, Ben Wong, Grace Chan, Rachel Kan, David Chiang, Harriet Yeung, Tyson Chak, Roxanne Tong, Timothy Cheng, Bob Cheung, Otto Chan, Ricky Wong, Jimmy Au	“愛是無盡” (Infinite love) by Auston Lam	23	Historical period drama, Martial arts, Comedy	
02 Apr- 18 May	Daddy Cool 逆緣	35	Amy Wong (producer); Lau Chi-wah, Ng Siu-tung (writers); Wayne Lai, Carlos Chan, David Chiang, Rosina Lam, Joel Chan, Elvina Kong, Pat Ha, Lai Lok-yi, Kandy Wong, Mary Hon, Helen Ma, Stefan Wong, William Chak	‘’逆天’’ (Turn over) by Fred Cheng	27	Sci-fi, Drama	
21 May- 8 July	Deep in the Realm of Conscience 宮心計2·深宮計	36	Mui Siu-ching, Ben Fong (producers); Siu Chi Lam, Yi Mui Fung (writers); Nancy Wu, Annie Liu, Steven Ma, Kenneth Ma, Edwin Siu, Alice Chan, Chrissie Chau, Jacqueline Wong, Susan Tse, Candy Lo, Angie Cheong, Pinky Cheung, Mary Hon, Kay Li-Lung, Rosanne Lui, Michelle Yim, Lee Lung-kei, Akina Hong, Andrew Yuen Man-kit, Savio Tsang, Eric Li	"無悔無愧" (Regretless) by Nancy Wu "明月與海"(Moon and Sea) by Steven Ma & Nancy Wu "飛蛾撲火" (Flying into the flame) by Hana Kuk	29	Historical period drama	
9 July- 03 Aug	Who Wants a Baby? BB来了	20	Liao Jianshuo (producer); Wong Bing-yee (writer); Ali Lee, Lai Lok-yi, Samantha Ko, Tsui Wing, Stefan Wong, Claire Yiu, Carlo Ng, Angelica Lo, Griselda Yeung, Law Lok-lam, Rebecca Chan, Eileen Yeow	"有了你" (Having you) by Kayee Tam	28	Family drama	
06 Aug- 06 Oct	Story of Yanxi Palace 延禧攻略	70	Hui Kai-dong, Wen Deguang (directors), Zheng Yu (producer); Qin Lan, Nie Yuan, Charmaine Sheh, Wu Jinyan, Tan Zhuo, Xu Kai, Jenny Zhang, Kevin Xu	"無常春秋" (Impermanent) by Jinny Ng	31	Historical Period Drama, Wuxia	
08 Oct- 09 Nov	Life on the Line 跳躍生命線	25	Dave Fong (producer); Sin Tsui-ching (writer); Joe Ma, Matthew Ho, Moon Lau, Jeannie Chan, Kelly Cheung, Bob Cheung, Arnold Kwok, Willie Wai, Joey Law, Pinky Cheung, Lee Shing-cheong, Helena Law, Susan Tse	“無畏的肩膊” (Fearless) by Fred Cheng “從未說起”&”但願人長久 (Never said) & (Last forever) by Hana Kuk “只怕不够时间看你白头” (About Time) by Bob Cheung & Gladys Li	29	Medical Drama	
12 Nov- 23 Dec	Fist Fight 兄弟	30	Lam Chi-wah, Yip Tin Shing (producers); Vincent Wong, Mat Yeung, Philip Ng, Rebecca Zhu, Kaman Kong, Tiffany Lau, Shek Sau, Toby Chan, Jack Hui	"非凡" (Outstanding) by Vincent Wong "別再怕" (Don't Be Afraid) by Hana Kuk	27	Crime thriller, Action	
24 Dec- 02 Feb (to 2019)	Guardian Angel 守護神之保險調查	36	Virginia Lok, Chung Shu-Kai (producers); Michael Miu, Bosco Wong, Annie Liu, Kate Tsui, Hui Shiu-hung, Irene Wan, Philip Keung, Alex Lam, Hugo Ng, Maggie Siu, MC Jin, Evergreen Mak, Akina Hong, Angie Cheong, Mimi Kung, Hedwig Tam, Ai Wai, Johnny Ngan, Deon Cheung, Stephanie Au, Louis Yan, Jermey Xu, Zhai Tian Lin, Hai Lu, Kent Tong, Paw Hee-ching	世世 (Worldly) by A-Lin, 另一種開始 (Another Start) by Isabelle Huang, 守護人 (Guardian) by James Ng	25	Crime drama	

== Third line-up ==
These dramas air in Hong Kong from 9:30pm to 10:30pm, Monday to Friday on Jade.

Background shading indicates dramas not produced by TVB.

Broadcast	English title (Chinese title)	Eps.	Cast and crew	Theme song(s)	Avg. rating	Genre	Ref.
(from 2017); 27 Nov– 19 Jan	Heart and Greed 溏心風暴3	40	Lau Ka-ho, Tsui Yu-on (producers); Sham Kwok-wing, Leong Man-wah (writers); Louise Lee, Ha Yu, Michelle Yim, Susanna Kwan, Louis Yuen, Bosco Wong, Vincent Wong, Eliza Sam, Priscilla Wong, Sharon Chan, Yumiko Cheng, Bianca Wu, Michael Tong, Steven Ma, Joseph Lee, Ben Wong, Chow Chung, Liza Wang, Nora Miao, Maria Cordero, Jason Chan Chi-san, Luk Ho-ming	"我本無罪" (Innocent) by Susanna Kwan "欲言又止"(Lost for words) by Vincent Wong & Hana KukI Promise by Linda Chung	23	Family drama	
22 Jan– 03 Mar	Infernal Affairs 無間道	30	Tommy Leung (producer); Nick Leung, Hong Jinpo (directors); Gallen Lo, Him Law, Wang Yang, Jolie Zhu, Cecilia So, Bernice Liu, Toby Leung, Damian Lau, Eric Tsang, Yuen Biao, Richie Jen, Edmond Leung, Shek Sau, Wilson Lam, Berg Ng, Ai Wai, Stephanie Che, Mimi Kung, Dominic Lam, Lo Hoi Pang, Philip Keung, Derek Kok, Kevin Chu, Ken Lo	"無間道" (Infernal Affairs Theme Song) by Edmond Leung & Richie Jen	22	Crime drama, Action, Thriller	
05 Mar- 13 Apr	Apple-colada 果欄中的江湖大嫂	30	Leung Choi-yuen (producer); Ng Lap-kwong (writer); Alice Chan, Raymond Wong Ho-yin, Eliza Sam, Mat Yeung, Tommy Wong, Crystal Fung, Kaman Kong, Andrew Yuen Man-kit, Jazz Lam, Lau Kong, Amy Fan, Angel Chiang, Erin Wong, Quinn Ho, Suet Nay, Eric Li, KK Cheung, Carisa Yan, Stephen Wong Ka-lok, Frankie Choi, Angelina Lo, Lily Li, Carlo Ng, Matthew Ho, Steve Lee	‘’伴你闖蕩’’ (An adventure with you) by Kayee Tam	27	Modern drama, Comedy	
16 Apr- 11 May	Stealing Seconds 棟仁的時光	20	Steven Yap (producer); Yung Sin-ying (writer); Benjamin Yuen, Natalie Tong, Rebecca Zhu, Hubert Wu, Stefan Wong, Jazz Lam, Candice Chiu, Joe Cheng, KK Cheung, Winki Lai, Arnold Kwok, Emily Wong, Bob Cheung, Eddie Koo, Hoi Yeung, Jack Hui, Geoffrey Wong, Janice Shum, Aliya Fan	‘’最難忘一天’’ (An unforgettable day) by Hubert Wu ’’回到以前’’ (Back to the day we met) by Hana Kuk	23	Romantic Comedy	
14 May- 22 Jun	Flying Tiger 飛虎之潛行極戰	30	Virginia Lok, Raymond Lee (producers); Ma Yim (writer); Michael Miu, Bosco Wong, Ron Ng, Eddie Cheung, Michael Wong, Hugo Ng, Oscar Leung, Venus Wong, Mandy Wong, Grace Chan, Samantha Ko, Christine Ng, Mimi Kung, Joel Chan, Hugo Wong, Michelle Saram, Jeana Ho, Shin Ng, Eugina Lau, Derek Kok, Stanley Cheung, Brian Tse, Arnold Kwok, Dickson Wong, Thomas Ng, Vincent Lam Wai, Lam King Ching, Penny Chan, Virginia Lau, Lena Li	"Reunion"(團聚) by Raymond Lam & MC Jin "Although This World" (雖然這個世界) by Ron Ng & Bosco Wong.	26	Police drama, Crime, Action	
25 Jun - 29 July	Succession War 天命	28	Chong Wai-kin (producer); Yip Tin Shing, Lin Li Mei (writers); Ruco Chan, Shaun Tam, Selena Li, Natalie Tong, Elaine Yiu, Joel Chan, KK Cheung, Jonathan Cheung, Yoyo Chen, Stephanie Ho, Matthew Ho, Henry Lo, Lee Shing-cheong, Jack Wu, Eddie Pang, Oscar Li, David Do, Angelina Lo, Jess Sum, Pinky Cheung, Candice Chiu, Sunny Dia, Andrew Yuen Man-kit	"Remorse"(悔別離) by Ruco Chan	22	Historical period drama	
06 Aug - 07 Sept	The Stunt 特技人	25	Wong Wai-yan (producer); Lam Lai-mei (writer); Shaun Tam, Rebecca Zhu, Kelvin Kwan, Kelly Fu, Jack Wu, Jess Sum, Claire Yiu, Strawberry Yeung, Brian Chu, Milkson Fong, Auston Lam, Ken Law, Alan Wan, Aurora Li, Henry Yu, Tyson Chak, Sam Tsang	"Belief"(信念) by Fred Cheng "Lonely" by Kayee Tam	22	Drama, Action	
10 Sept - 28 Oct	Another Era 再創世紀	36	Kwan Shu-ming (producer); Choi Ting-ting, Sin Siu-ling (writers); Francis Fung Yat-chun (screenwriter); Roger Kwok, Niki Chow, Frankie Lam, Tavia Yeung, Linda Chung, Benjamin Yuen, Pakho Chau, Gloria Tang, Roxanne Tong, Pat Poon, Dominic Lam, Wang Zhuo, Zhihui Yu, Bowie Wu, Yoyo Chen, Antia Lee, Florence Kwok, Hoi Yeung, Max Cheung, Geoffrey Wong, Lee Shing-cheong, Gary Tam, Nicole Wan, Carlo Ng, King Lam, Helen Ma, Griselda Yeung, Willie Lau, Otto Chan, Russell Cheung	Utopia (烏托邦) by Pakho Chau; Love you again (只想與你再一起) by Hana Kuk; Have been betrayed (為何你要背叛我) by Jinny Ng	21	Epic drama	
29 Oct - 01 Dec	OMG, Your Honour 是咁的，法官閣下	25	Andy Chan (producer); Lee Sin (writer); Ben Wong, Eddie Kwan, Grace Wong, Louisa Mak, Hugo Wong, Oscar Leung, Jackson Lai, Jonathan Wong, Kirby Lam, King Lam, Joseph Lee, Stephanie Che, Mandy Lam, Tyson Chak, KK Cheung, Lisa Ch'ng, Harriet Yeung, Henry Lo, Jarryd Tam, Joey Law, Eileen Yeow, Angelica Lo, Mat Yeung, Brian Chu	Rationality and Sensibility (理性感性) by Hubert Wu; Love is blind (戀愛幼稚) by Grace Wong	24	Legal drama	
03 Dec - 11 Jan (to 2019)	The Learning Curve of a Warlord 大帥哥	30	Steven Tsui (producer); Lau Choi-wan, Chan Kei, Ruby Law Pui-ching (writers); Dicky Cheung, Tony Hung, Sisley Choi, Raymond Cho, Vivien Yeo, Tsui Wing, Oscar Li, Jessica Kan, Zoie Tam, Choi Kwok-hing, Gary Chan, Jerry Ku, Max Cheung, Eddie Pang, Dickson Li, Virginia Lau, John Chan, Keith Mok, Celine Ma	Bravery (大無畏) & Our Romance (蜜運) by Dicky Cheung	28	Period drama, Comedy	

== Weekend dramas ==
These dramas air in Hong Kong from 8:30pm to 10:30pm, with two back-to-back episodes Sunday on Jade.

Starting on 30 July 2018 until 3 August 2018 from Monday thru Friday at 9:30 pm to 10:30 pm only on Jade.

Background shading indicates dramas not produced by TVB.

Broadcast	English title (Chinese title)	Eps.	Cast and crew	Theme song(s)	Avg. rating	Genre	Notes	Official website
(from 2017); 10 Dec– 11 Feb	Come with Me 性在有情	18	Jazz Boon (producer); Leung Yan-tung (writer); Eddie Cheung, Sharon Chan, Elena Kong, Louis Yuen, Hui Shiu-hung, Sammy Sum, May Chan, Grace Wong, Helena Law, Chung King-fai, Angelina Lo	"講" (Speak) by Sharon Chan, Louis Yuen, Grace Wong, Hoffman Cheng, Stephanie Ho, Ronald Law	17	Comedy drama		
18 Feb– 15 Apr	Threesome 三個女人一個「因」	18	Poon Ka-tak (producer); Steffie Lai (writer); Mandy Wong, Benjamin Yuen, Jason Chan Chi-san, Gigi Wong, Jerry Ku, Snow Suen, Arnold Kwok	“無雙” (Uniquely me) by Miriam Yeung	19	Romantic comedy		
29 Apr- 8 July & 30 July- 03 Aug	The Great Adventurer Wesley 冒險王衛斯理	27	Wong Jing (producer); Billy Chung, Clarence Fok (directors); Shawn Yue, Michelle Hu, Simon Yam, Gordon Lam, Raymond Wong Ho-yin, Philip Ng, Dominic Ho, Connie Man, Yu Sin-ming, Sammi Cheung Sau-Man, Kingdom Yuen, Janice Man, Monica Chan, Lawrence Ng, Wong Jing, Winnie Leung, Iris Chung, Gill Mohinder Paul Singh, Raquel Xu, David Kurata, Vincent Lam Wai, Tony Ho, Yang Rong, Natalie Fong, Kimmy Wong, Izumi Soko	"愛你直到宇宙終結"(Love you until the end of the universe) by Jordan Chan	18	Sci-fi, Action, Adventure, Drama, Mystery	iQIYI co-production	
25 Nov– 13 Jan (to 2019)	Wife Interrupted 救妻同學會	8	Kwan Shu Ming (producer); Sin-Siu Ling (writer); Hubert Wu, Moon Lau, Ashley Chu, Alvin Ng, Wong Mei-Ki, Telford Wong, Virginia Lau, Jarryd Tam, Rainky Wai, Kyle Li, Jessica Kan, Stitch Yu, Arnold Kwok, Alycia Chan, Andrew Yuen Man-kit, Eileen Yeow	Taking Chances (為愛冒險) by Hubert Wu; Missed (太難開始) by Hubert Wu; Amazing Grace by Kayee Tam; Once Again (重複愛一次) by Alvin Ng	14	Trendy Drama		

== Notes ==
- Come with Me 性在有情; Released June 5, 2016. Copyright notice: 2016.
