= List of Only You characters =

Only You (Traditional Chinese: Only You 只有您) is a 2011 Hong Kong television serial drama produced by TVB.

== Characters ==
=== Chong's family ===
Cast	Role	Description
Louise Lee	Chong Sze-tim 莊思甜	"Only You" matchmaker Chong Sze-chai's elder sister Ma Kai-hung's separated wife, and divorced in Episode 30; Sze-to Fei-fei's sister-in-law Ma Hiu-ching's mother Chong Chung-leung's aunt Leung Kwai's master
Evergreen Mak	Chong Sze-chai 莊思齊	"Only You" boss Part-time funeral agent Chong Sze-tim's younger brother Sze-to Fei-fei's husband Chong Chung-leung's father Ma Hiu-ching's uncle Lau Siu-long's blood brother
Kristal Tin	Sze-to Fei-fei, Phoebe 司徒菲菲	"Only You" boss Chong Sze-tim's sister-in-law Chong Sze-chai's wife Chong Chung-leung's stepmother Ma Hiu-ching's aunt Ha Tin-sang's supervisor Mak Yat-man's friend
Natalie Tong	Ma Hiu-ching 馬曉晴	Ma Kai-hung and Chong Sze-tim's daughter Chong Sze-chai and Sze-to Fei-fei's niece Chong Chung-leung's cousin
Vin Choi	Chong Chung-leung, Leo 莊忠良	A post-secondary student "Only You" assistant Chong Sze-chai's son Sze-to Fei-fei's stepson Chong Sze-tim's nephew Ma Hiu-ching's cousin Miki's boyfriend, later broke up Lau Siu-long's student

=== Mak's family ===
Cast	Role	Description
Suet Nei	Cheung Suet-ha 張雪霞	Mak Yat-man and Mak Yat-ming's mother
Yoyo Mung	Mak Yat-man, Mandy 麥一敏	Cheung Suet-ha's daughter Mak Yat-ming's elder sister Ha Tin-sang's girlfriend Sze-to Fei-fei and Lam Yee-ling and Hui Miu-yan's friend Fung Yat-chiu and Ashley's ex-girlfriend
Eddie Li	Mak Yat-ming, Dee 麥一鳴	Magazine operations officer Cheung Suet-ha's son Mak Yat-man's younger brother Chiu Wing-fung's husband
Leanne Li	Chiu Wing-fung, Rainbow 趙詠鳳	A jewellery designer Mak Yat-ming's wife

=== Ha's family ===
Cast	Role	Description
Wong Chun-tong	Ha Kong, Herbert 夏江	A businessman and a social dance student, de facto a swindler Ha Tin-sang's father Arrested by the police in Episode 19 (Villain)
So Yan-tsz	-	Ha Kong's wife Ha Tin-sang's mother Deceased
Kevin Cheng	Ha Tin-sang, Summer 夏天生	Ha Kong's son Mak Yat-man's boyfriend Hon Tsz-yiu's ex-boyfriend Chong Sze-chai's friend Sze-to Fei-fei's subordinate

=== Only You Wedding Services Company Limited ===
Cast	Role	Description
Evergreen Mak	Chong Sze-chai 莊思齊	Boss
Kristal Tin	Sze-to Fei-fei, Phoebe 司徒菲菲	Boss
Louise Lee	Chong Sze-tim 莊思甜	Matchmaker
Yoyo Mung	Mak Yat-man 麥一敏	Wedding planning assistant
Kevin Cheng	Ha Tin-sang 夏天生	Chief photographer
Lai Lok-yi	Cheung King-yuen 張景源	Photographer; Erica's boyfriend, later husband
Sam Chan	Yu Chi-keung 余志強	Cosmetician; Candy's boyfriend
Vin Choi	Chong Chung-leung 莊忠良	Assistant
Meini Cheung	Candy	Receptionist; Yu Chi-keung's girlfriend
Lau Kwai-fong	Lee Lai-fong 李麗芳	Receptionist

Cast	Role	Description
Eddie Li	Mak Yat-ming, Dee 麥一鳴	Chiu Wing-fung's husband
Leanne Li	Chiu Wing-fung, Rainbow 趙詠鳳	Mak Yat-ming's wife

==== My Despicable Ex-boyfriend (Episode 3 - 4) ====
Cast	Role	Description
Johnson Lee	Fung Yat-chiu 馮日超	May's boyfriend Mak Yat-man's ex-boyfriend Cheated Mak Yat-man (Villain)
Claire Yiu	May	Fung Yat-chiu's girlfriend Framed Mak Yat-man (Villain)

==== Ex-convict's Wedding (Episode 4 - 6) ====
Cast	Role	Description
Alice Fung So-bor		Tong Yin-shan's mother Opposed Tong Yin-shan to marry with Ng Siu-hoi
Macy Chan	Tong Yin-shan 唐燕珊	A nurse Ng Siu-hoi's girlfriend Ha Tin-sang and Cheung King-yuen's friend
Ruco Chan	Ng Siu-hoi 吳兆海	An ex-convict and a garage technician Tong Yin-shan's boyfriend
Wong Man-pui	Lam Pau 林豹	A triad leader Ng Siu-hoi's ex-triad leader Threatened Ng Siu-hoi to rejoin triad society (Villain)
Au Sui-wai	Wong Sir 黃Sir	A CID inspector Used Ng Siu-hoi to catch Lam Pau

==== Amazing Love (Episode 7 - 9) ====
Cast	Role	Description
Vin Choi	Chong Chung-leung 莊忠良	Miki's boyfriend, later broke up
Lee Yee-man	Miki	A shop sales Suffered from psychiatric Chong Chung-leung's girlfriend, later broke up (Villain)

==== I Have a Dream (Episode 11 - 13) ====
Cast	Role	Description
Kitty Yuen	Man Ching, Maggie 文靜	A bacteria researcher of Science Park; On Tsz-him's wife Rebecca's love rival
Stephen Huynh	On Tsz-him, Angus 安子謙	Malaysian Chinese and a wealthy son Man Ching's husband Rebecca's ex-boyfriend
Jeanette Leung	Rebecca	A model On Tsz-him's ex-girlfriend Man Ching's love rival (Villain)
Bowie Wu	Seventh Granduncle 七叔公	Bird's nest soup businessman Ashley's father
Joel Chan	Ashley	Seventh Granduncle's son On Tsz-him's groomsman Keegan's ex-boyfriend Mak Yat-man's boyfriend, broke up finally Cheated Mak Yat-man (Villain)
Mat Yeung	Keegan	Ashley's ex-boyfriend

==== Perfection of Deformity (Episode 14-15) ====
Cast	Role	Description
Raymond Wong Ho-yin	Wong Chi-chak 王志澤	A blind person Fong Miu-kuen's fiancé
Elena Kong	Fong Miu-kuen 方妙娟	A mainlander Wong Chi-chak's fiancée Luk Heung-wing's girlfriend, later broke up
Lam King-kong	Luk Heung-wing 陸向榮	A mainlander Fong Miu-kuen's boyfriend, later broke up Ordered Fong Miu-kuen to have bogus marriage with Wong Chi-chak to get right of abode in Hong Kong (Villain)

==== Her Husband is a Boss (Episode 15 - 17) ====
Cast	Role	Description
Wong Ching	Lau Wah 劉華	A dojo instructor Lau Siu-long's father
Chin Kar-lok	Lau Siu-long 劉小龍	A dojo owner Lau Wah's son Siu Shuk-chu's husband Chong Sze-chai's blood brother Chong Chung-leung's master
Ella Koon	Siu Shuk-chu 蕭淑珠	Lau Siu-long's wife Siu Shuk-fu's younger sister Yu Chi-keung's ex-girlfriend
Cheng Ka-sang	Siu Shuk-fu 蕭淑虎	A dojo instructor Siu Shuk-chu's elder brother

==== A Wealthy Family's Wedding (Episode 20 - 21) ====
Cast	Role	Description
Chun Wong	Heung Yin-pui 香彥培	Tang Choi-kiu and Lee Chui-yin's husband Heung Wai-ho's father
Susan Tse	Tang Choi-kiu 鄧彩嬌	Heung Yin-pui's first wife Heung Wai-ho's stepmother Colluded with Wong Mei-ho to frame Lee Chui-yin (Villain)
Cecilia Fong	Lee Chui-yin 李翠妍	Heung Yin-pui's second wife Heung Wai-ho's mother
Fred Cheng	Heung Wai-ho 香偉豪	Heung Yin-pui and Lee Chui-yin's son Tang Choi-kiu's stepson Becky's husband
Doris Chow	Becky	Heung Wai-ho's wife

==== Mom, I'm Getting Married (Episode 22 - 25) ====
Cast	Role	Description
Natalie Tong	Ma Hiu-ching 馬曉晴	Marco's wife
Alan Wan	Marco	An Australian Chinese; Ma Hiu-ching's husband
Lau Dan	Ma Kai-hung 馬啟雄	Chong Sze-tim's separated husband, and divorced in Episode 30; Ma Hiu-ching's father Ho Yuk-ying's boyfriend, and became husband in Episode 30
Rosanne Lui	Ho Yuk-ying 何玉英	Ma Kai-hung's girlfriend, and became wife in Episode 30

==== Dreams of the Closing Year (Episode 22 - 30) ====
Cast	Role	Description
Lai Huen	Wong Kau-mui 王九妹	Wong Fung's mother Wanted to find her missing husband, Ching Pun; Ching Kwok-fu's stepmother Chong Sze-tim's friend
Ching Hor-wai	Wong Fung 王逢	Wong Kau-mui's daughter
Lau Kong	Ching Kwok-fu 程國富	A Canadian immigrant Ching Pun's son Wong Kau-mui's stepson
Lau Dan	Ma Kai-hung 馬啟雄	Ho Yuk-ying's boyfriend, and became husband in Episode 30
Rosanne Lui	Ho Yuk-ying 何玉英	Ma Kai-hung's girlfriend, and became wife in Episode 30

==== My Indian Father-in-law (Episode 25 - 27) ====
Cast	Role	Description
Shermon Tang	Hui Miu-yan, Yan 許妙茵	A boutique owner Peter's wife Mak Yat-man and Lam Yee-ling's friend
Bitto Hartihan Singh	Peter	An Indian; Gill's son Hui Miu-yan's husband
Gill Mohindepaul Singh	Gill	An Indian; Peter's father

==== The Last Wedding (Episodes 27–30) ====
Cast	Role	Description
Lai Lok-yi	Cheung King-yuen King 張景源	Kaka's boyfriend, later husband Died of car accident in Episode 30
Elaine Yiu	Kaka	A bar beer girl Cheung King-yuen's girlfriend, later wife Died of car accident in Episode 30
Daniel Kwok	-	A drunk driver Knocked down and killed Cheung King-yuen and Kaka and died in Episode 30

=== Other characters ===
Cast	Role	Description
Yvonne Ho	Lam Yee-ling 林綺玲	Mak Yat-man and Hui Miu-yan's friend
Mimi Chu	Leung Kwai 梁貴	A matchmaker Chong Sze-tim's apprentice
Helen Ma	Wong Mei-ho 黃美好	A matchmaker Chong Sze-tim's apprentice and enemy, but finally became friends Framed Chong Sze-tim and Leung Kwai (Main villain)
Lo Koon-lan	Mrs. Chan 陳太	A government official Only You's client
Vivien Yeo	Hon Tsz-yiu 韓芷瑤	Ha Tin-sang's ex-girlfriend

== See also ==
- Only You
