= Barrack O'Karma 1968 =

Hong Kong television series

- 金宵大廈2
- Genre: Supernatural; Romance
- Written by: Ruby Law Pui-ching
- Starring: Joel Chan; Selena Lee; Christine Ng; Candice Chiu; Bob Cheung; Hubert Wu; Roxanne Tong; Karl Ting
- Theme music composer: Wong Fuk-ling
- Opening theme: Goodbye (今宵多珍重) by Kayee Tam (Cantonese version)
- Ending theme: Goodbye (今宵多珍重) by Vivian Koo (Mandarin version)
- Original language: Cantonese
- No. of episodes: 20

Production
- Producer: Yip Chun-fai
- Running time: 45 minutes
- Production company: TVB

Original release
- Network: TVB
- Release: 4 April – 29 April 2022

Related
- Barrack O'Karma (2019)

Barrack O'Karma 1968 (Chinese: 金宵大廈2; lit. Twilight Mansion 2) is a 2022 Hong Kong supernatural romantic drama television series produced by TVB. It stars Joel Chan and Selena Lee as the main leads. The series is a reboot of the 2019 drama Barrack O'Karma and centres around the theme of parallel universes.

== Production ==
Filming started in September and ended in November 2020.

== Synopsis ==
Maurice (Joel Chan) had gone missing in Twilight Mansion. When he was found, Maurice has lost all of his memories. To find out what had happened to him, Ella (Selena Lee), Maurice’s girlfriend, went to Twilight Mansion...

== Cast and characters ==
=== Main cast ===
- Joel Chan as Maurice, a barista and Ella’s boyfriend.
  - Chan also portrayed Joey Chow Yi (周意), a freelance journalist. (in parallel universe)
  - Chan portrayed a psychiatric patient in the 1960s as well. In fact he was Joey who travelled through different parallel universes.
  - Chan portrayed an architect in 1960s who designed Twilight Mansion in episode 20.
  - Curtis Ho as young Joey.
- Selena Lee as Ella, Maurice’s girlfriend.
  - Lee also portrayed Lydia, an actress. (in parallel universe)
  - Lee portrayed a psychiatrist in the 1960s as well.
  - Tse Yu-yan as young Ella.

=== Recurring cast ===
==== Ep. 1-2 ====
- Timothy Cheng as Chan Hei-lik (陳喜力), a funeral director, Chan Kin-lik‘s father and Chan Sang-lik’s son.
- Randal Tsang as Chan Kin-lik (陳健力), a funeral apprentice, Chan Hei-lik‘s son and Chan Sang-lik’s grandson.
- Henry Yu as Chan Sang-lik (陳生力), Chan Hei-lik’s father and Chan Kin-lik‘s grandfather.

==== Ep. 3-4 ====
- Christine Ng as Lee Shuk-fun (李淑芬), Kwok Miu-miu’s mother.
- Chloe So as Kwok Miu-miu (郭渺渺), Lee Shuk-fun‘s daughter whose face was disfigured by corrosive liquid.
  - Sophia Lam as young Kwok Miu-miu.

==== Ep. 5-6 ====
- Willie Wai as Yam Sai-ka (任世嘉), Yam Tin-tong‘s father.
- Jazz Lam as But Tak-liu (畢得了), a game character.
- Enson Lau as Yam Tin-tong (任天堂), Yam Sai-Kay’s son who suffered from Lou Gehrig's disease, and teammate of Yeung Yeung, Ho-keung and Ah Ching when playing computer games.
- Zac Liu as Yeung Yeung (楊洋), teammate of Yam Tin-tong, Ho-keung and Ah Ching when playing computer games.
- Thomas Ng as Ho-keung (豪強), teammate of Yam Tin-tong, Yeung Yeung and Ah Ching when playing computer games.
- Aurora Li as Ah Ching (阿晴), teammate of Yam Tin-tong, Yeung Yeung and Ho-keung when playing computer games.

==== Ep. 7-8 ====
- Geoffrey Wong as Ng Nai-keung (吳乃強), Chow Siu-hung’s husband, Lulu’s father, Ah Bong’s father in law and Louisa’s employer.
- Amy Fan as Chow Siu-hung (周小紅), Ng Nai-keung’s wife, Lulu’s mother, Ah Bong’s mother in law and Louisa’s employer.
- Franchesca Wong as Louisa, a Filipino domestic worker employed by Ng Nai-keung and Chow Siu-hung.
  - Wong also portrayed Lulu, Ng Nai-keung and Chow Siu-hung’s daughter, and Ah Bong’s wife. She had died in a traffic accident.
- Lam King-ching as Ah Bong (阿邦), Lulu’s husband, and Ng Nai-keung and Chow Siu-hung’s son in law.

==== Ep. 9-10 ====
- Candice Chiu as Sei Ye (四爺), a real estate agent and Lee Mau-on’s supervisor. (in parallel universe)
  - Chiu also portrayed Jessie Yuen, a barrister, Ella’s good friend, Leo’s colleague and girlfriend.
- Derek Wong as Lee Mau-on (李茂安), a real estate agent and Sei Ye’s subordinate. (in parallel universe)
  - Wong also portrayed Leo Man, Jessie’s colleague and boyfriend.

==== Ep. 11-12 ====
- Chiu Chung-yu as Law Yee-lai (羅伊麗), a single mother and Cheung Tsz-long‘s mother.
- Hung Cheuk-lok as Cheung Tsz-long (張梓朗), Law Yee-lai‘s son.
- Penny Chan as Raymond Ho Yee-sing (何懿星), a candidate in the District Council election.

==== Ep. 13-14 ====
- Roxanne Tong as Lai Sin-yi (黎倩儀), a private tutor and Kim’s die hard fan.
- Arnold Kwok as Kim Seok-hun (金碩訓), better known as Kim, a popular K-pop singer and Lai Sin-yi’s idol.

==== Ep. 15-16 ====
- Karl Ting as Kam Yat-hung (甘逸鴻), better known as Ah Kam (阿甘), a food deliverer and Suki’s boyfriend.
- Kelly Ng as Suki, a cosmetic sales and Ah Kam’s girlfriend.
- Chloe Nguyen as Nana Wong, better known as “Marble” (彈彈珠), chief creative director of MIA.
- Jason Lau as Tong Kwai-cheung (湯貴祥), who believed Jessica F was his missing daughter.
- Kayan Choi as Jessica F, a KOL who was suspected to be kidnapped.

==== Ep. 17-18 ====
- Hubert Wu as Siu Ching (小程), a Qipao tailor who had a crush on Florence.
- Shiga Lin as Florence Yip Fo-wan (葉科雲), a secretary and Dave’s fiancée.
- Jeremy Wong as Dave Lee, Florence’s fiancé.

==== Ep. 19-20 ====
- Bob Cheung as Ah Lam (阿Lam), the new owner of Ella father’s camera shop who knew about the existence of parallel universes in Twilight Mansion and could travel through different universes. He was in fact Lam Yeuk-sze (林若思) in the first series.
- Lau Kong as Lam Yeuk-sze (林若思). (Guest appearance in episode 20)

== Controversy ==
In episode 7-8 of the series, Canadian-Hong Kong actress Franchesca Wong portrayed Louisa, a Filipino domestic helper. Her performance was praised by local media and audience. During filming, Wong applied cosmetics to darken her skin. However, this ignited criticisms of brownface and racial discrimination from overseas media. The controversy received international attention and was reported by media from Taiwan, Singapore, Malaysia, The Philippines, India and The United States.

On 14 April 2022, TVB publicly apologised and stated that there was no intention to express disrespect or discrimination against any nationalities. On 20 April, Wong publicly apologised via her Instagram account for the negative impacts caused by the series and her character, and expressed that she had no intention of disrespect or discrimination against any ethnicities.

== Viewership ratings ==
Episodes	Broadcast date	Ratings	Ref
1-5	4–8 April 2022	18.8	
6-10	11–15 April 2022	18.5	
11-15	18–22 April 2022	16.5	
16-20	25–28 April 2022	15.6	
Average ratings		17.4	
