= Face to Fate =

- Genre: Wuxia
- Based on: Story by Woon Swee Oan (original story)
- Starring: Frankie Lam; Raymond Lam; Tavia Yeung; Selena Li
- Opening theme: Pei King Zam Ci (披荊斬刺) performed by Raymond Lam
- Ending theme: Ko Kan (靠近) performed by Frankie Lam and Tavia Yeung
- Country of origin: Hong Kong
- Original language: Cantonese
- No. of episodes: 30

Production
- Running time: 45 minutes per episode

Original release
- Network: TVB
- Release: 2006 – 2007

Face to Fate
- Chinese: 布衣神相
Transcriptions
Standard Mandarin
- Hanyu Pinyin: Bù Yī Shén Xiàng
Yue: Cantonese
- Jyutping: Bou3 Ji1 San4 Soeng1

Face to Fate is a Hong Kong television series released overseas in September 2006 and aired locally on TVB Pay Vision Channel in March 2007. The series is an adaptation of wuxia writer Woon Swee Oan's works.

== Synopsis ==
In a war against the Evil, the White Force and the Black Force have a Golden Seal Battle every five years. Each force selects five people to represent its community. Whichever side wins the battle has control of the Wu Xia World for the next five years. However, over the years, the Black Force have become more evil than before, and their goal evolved to destroy all the Good to allow the Evil power to control the world.

The head of the White Force is the Flying Fish Village led by Shum Shing-Nam (David Chiang). In the White Force, the five people who were supposed to represent the community were secretly killed, and hence the series "Face to Fate" begins. In order to participate in the next Golden Seal Battle, the White Force has to look for five more talented people to fight the Black Force. Li Bo-Yee (Frankie Lam), the fortune teller; Lai Yuek-Yee (Raymond Lam), the doctor; and Yip Mung-Sik (Tavia Yeung), are on the mission to look for five talented fighters.

Through their mission, many circumstances led to obstacles into their mission such as Lai Yuek-Yee possess a deadly disease that makes him age prematurely, Mung-Sik is the daughter of a demon of the Black Force, etc. As the story progresses, the three do find five more people to battle. Unfortunately, one of them is killed, forcing Li Bo-Yee to replace him.

Meanwhile, Lai Leuk-Yee meets the love of his life, Yin Ye-Loi (Selena Li), who also has a secret identity. Because of this secret identity, the White Force does not like Yin Ye-Loi. One of the White Force attacks Ye-Loi, causing Lai Leuk-Yee to join the Black Force...

== Cast ==
Note: Some of the characters' names are in Cantonese romanization.

Cast	Role	Description
Frankie Lam	Li Bo-Yee 李布衣	Mr. Li (Magical Fortune Teller); Yip Mung-Sik's lover. He and Go Shu-Tin are disciples from the Mo-gig sector.
Raymond Lam	Lai Yeuk-Yee 賴藥兒	Doctor Lai; Part of the famous Lai family known for being doctors of medicine. Yin Ye-Loi's lover. Influenced by White and Black. Anti-Hero
Tavia Yeung	Yip Mung-Sik 葉夢色	Li Bo-Yee's lover. Go Shu-Tin's long-lost biological daughter. Third disciple at Flying Fish Heights. Her biological mother was killed by Go Shu-Tin due to jealousy. Takes over the Heavenly Desire Palace after her father dies.
Selena Li	Yuk Fu-Yung / Yin Ye-Loi 嫣夜來	Owner of Yuet Loi Inn Lai Yeuk-Yee's lover. She has a secret identity as a former wanted thief for stealing from the royal tomb. She is a widow as her husband died on their wedding day, and she is left to care for her mother-in-law and stepson.
Derek Kok	Lau Fan-Yue 柳焚餘	Green Eyebrow (Assassin); Shum Koh-Hung's lover/husband. He retires from the Wuxia world after falling in love with Shum Koh-Hung, but comes out of retirement to help rebuild Flying Fish Heights.
David Chiang	Shum Shing-Nam 沈星南	Leader of Flying Fish Heights Yeuk-Lan's husband. Shum Koh-Hung's father. Leader of the white force. Villain
Anne Heung	Yeuk-Lan 藥蘭	Madam of Fly Fish Heights Shum Shing-Nam's wife. Shum Koh-Hung's stepmother. Ex-love interest of Li Bo-Yee. She was killed by Shum Shing-Nam after she found out his secrets.
Nancy Wu	Shum Kon-Hung 沈絳紅	Shum Shing-Nam's biological daughter. Lau Fan-Yue's lover and later wife. She retires from wuxia world but comes back to help rebuild Flying Fish Heights. She becomes pregnant near the end.
Mark Kwok (actor)	Yip Man-Ting	Shum Shing-Nam's first disciple. Dies from the guilt of killing one of Shum Shing-Nam's disciple.
Joel Chan	Yip Chor-Sum	Shum Shing-Nam's second disciple. Ex-love interest of Yip Mung-sik's.
Felix Lok	Ying Tin-Hang / Go Shu-Tin 哥舒天	Leader of the Heavenly Desire Palace Yip Mung-Sik's biological father. Leader of the black way. He was the First Senior Disciple who made the prophecy the Evil Way would take over and started doing evil things, he became trapped in the forbidden ground of Peach Blossom Garden by his Master. But was released because Li Bo-Yee helped pull out the needle from his head and, as a result, ended up killing the whole Mo-gig Sector except Li Bo-Yee. He dies from internal injuries. Main Villain
	Death Wish	Master Death Wish A monk from the Wu Tai Mountain that wishes to die. A close friend of Li Bo-yee and was thought to be Yip Mung-Sik's biological father, but turned out to not be true.

== 5 Major Cliques of The Good Way ==
=== Flying Fish Heights ===
Cast	Role	Description
David Chiang	Shum Shing-Nam 沈星南	Head of Fly Fish Heights & Leader of The Good Way Uses Red Sand Palm wuxia.
Anne Heung	Yeuk-Lan 藥蘭	Madam of Fly Fish Heights Wife of Shing-Nam and is deeply devoted to him. Loves orchids.
Mark Kwok (actor)	Yip Man-Ting	1st Senior Disciple One of the known 4 Little Flying Fish of Flying Fish Heights.
Joel Chan	Yip Chor-Sum	2nd Senior Disciple One of the known 4 Little Flying Fish of Flying Fish Heights.
Tavia Yeung	Yip Mung-Sik 葉夢色	3rd Senior Disciple One of the known 4 Little Flying Fish of Flying Fish Heights.
Nancy Wu	Shum Kon-Hung 沈絳紅	4 Junior Disciple One of the known 4 Little Flying Fish of Flying Fish Heights.

External links

- TVB.com Face to Fate - Official Website (in Chinese)
- Windy-Goddess.net Face to Fate - Episodic Synopsis
