= Cheung Kit-lin =

Hong Kong television actress

- 張潔蓮

Jackeline Cheung Kit-lin (Chinese: 張潔蓮; born 1976) is a Hong Kong television actress.

== Career ==
She was among the top 20 finalists in the 1995 Miss Hong Kong Pageant, but was not selected and subsequently signed with TVB. She was an auditor in the 8th TVB Acting Training Class in 1995, alongside regular students such as Zuki Lee, Ng Wai-shan, Damon Law Koon-fung, Eric Lee Tin-cheung, Lau Wing-chun, Lo Cheuk-nam, Suen Yan-ming, Marco Lo Hing-fai, and LuLu Kai Sai-po. Auditors in the same class included Angela Tong Ying-ying, Eileen Yeow, Joyce Tang Lai-ming, Lau Wing-kin, Kwan Ho-wai, Suen Tai-lung, and Lee Wing-yee.

In the TVB children's television show Flash Fax, she played numerous roles throughout her four-year run.

== Personal life ==
Cheung was born in 1976. Her marriage in 2008 lasted three years. Cheung married Andrew Yuen Man-kit in 2020.
