= Randal Tsang =

- 曾展望
- Tsang in 2026
- Born: Los Angeles, California; United States
- Education: Hong Kong Polytechnic University

Randal Tsang Gin-mong (Chinese: 曾展望), also known as GM, is a Hong Kong actor, program host, and Taoist priest. He is currently an artist of TVB Manager Contract and was once a member of the "Youngsters" group on the show Young and Restless.

== Family and early life ==
Tsang was born in Los Angeles, California, United States. He moved to Hong Kong with his family when he was 3 years old. As a child, Tsang suffered from hyperactivity disorder.

Tsang attended S.K.H. Lam Woo Memorial Secondary School from 2009 to 2015. He subsequently studied Accounting at the Hong Kong Polytechnic University.

At the age of 20, Tsang visited Mount Longhu in Jiangxi Province and passed the examination to become ordinated a seventh-rank Taoist priest.
