= Alvin Ng =

Hong Kong male singer, host and actor under Voice Entertainment

- Born: 伍富橋; Ng Fu Kiu, Alvin; June 23, 1994 (age 32); British Hong Kong
- Occupations: Singer; host; actor
- Years active: August 27, 2017; 9 years ago
- Musical career
- Genre: Cantopop
- Label: Voice Entertainment→TVB Music Group

Alvin Ng is a Hong Kong male singer, host and actor under TVB and TVB Music Group who debuted in 2017 with the debut single, "How Can I Do".

In 2014, he participated in The Voice (Season 4) and came with 12th place He then won the 3rd place in TVB International Chinese New Talent Singing Championship in 2016.

== Early life ==
He graduated from Shek Lei Catholic Primary School, Tung Wah Group of Hospitals Mrs. Wu York Yu Memorial College and Dirigo High School. He was then promoted to University of Maine.

== Career ==
=== 2014-2016: The Voice 4 and TVB International Chinese New Talent Singing Championship ===
In 2014, he returned to Hong Kong from the United States to develop his career. He was then taken part in The Voice (Season 4) and ended up with 12th place. Later, he was signed to TVB.

In 2015, he was assigned to study in the TVB Acting Training Course. Also, he was selected to be host of the show, "Music Power". At the same time, he uploaded covers and music videos on YouTube.

In 2016, he participated in TVB International Chinese New Talent Singing Championship which was aired on February 25, 2017, and won the 3rd place. In June 2016, he announced he had signed the record deal with Voice Entertainment.

=== 2017-2018: Debut as singer and actor ===
In August 2017, he was debuted as a singer with the single, "How Can I Do".

In November 2018, he was featured in the TV series, "Wife Interrupted". According to Alvin, he replaced Dickson Yu because Dickson was passed out on August; it was also the first time for him to take up important role.

== Discography ==
=== Singles ===
List of singles
Released Date	Title	Album	Ref.
August 28, 2017	"How Can I Do" (Chinese: 我怎會如此)	—N/a	
November 9, 2017	"Holiday" (Chinese: 放假)	—N/a	

=== Soundtrack appearances ===
Released Date	Title	Television/Film	Ref.
October 17, 2016	"Meow Meow" (Chinese: 喵喵) (Note: with Auston Lam, Penny Chan ft. Stephen Cheng and Moses Chan)	My Lover from the Planet Meow	
December 11, 2017	"More Than Friends" (Chinese: 不只是朋友)	Heart and Greed	
December 2, 2018	"Once Again" (Chinese: 重複愛一次)	Wife Interrupted	
June 23, 2019	"A Good Time" (Chinese: 有你多好) (Note: with Kayee Tam and Auston Lam)	As Time Goes By	

== Filmography ==
=== Television dramas ===
Year	Television Drama	Broadcasting Channel	Role	Note	Ref.
2016	Come Home Love: Dinner at 8	TVB	Host (Carefree)	Episode 145	
2016	Law dis-Order	TVB	Journalist (Carefree)		
2016	Two Steps from Heaven	TVB	Jeffery King (Cameo)		
2017	Married but Available	TVB	Clerk (Carefree)		
2017	The Unholy Alliance	TVB	Killer; Gang members (Carefree)	Episode 1 Episode 9	
2017	The Exorcist's Meter	TVB	Firefighter (Carefree)		
2018	Threesome	TVB	Waiter (Carefree)		
2018	Wife Interrupted	TVB	Sun (Lead Role)		
2019	PTU 2019	TVB			
2019	My Commissioned Lover	TVB	Eddie (Cameo)		
Pending	Killer		Zero (Adolescence) (Cameo)		

=== Television appearances ===
Date	Show	Broadcasting Channel	Note
September 1, 2015	All Things Girl Season 5	TVB J2	Guest
September 16, 2017	Music Café	TVB J2	Performance How Can I Do
October 7, 2017	Music Café	TVB J2	Performance How Can I Do
October 14, 2017	Music Café	TVB J2	Performance How Can I Do
October 21, 2017	StarHub TVB Awards 2017	TVB	Performance 願你今晚別離去 (Note: Cover Leon Lai's song)
December 23, 2017	Music Café	TVB J2	Performance How Can I Do; Holiday
March 31, 2018	Music Café	TVB J2	Performance More Than Friends
April 14, 2018	Music Café	TVB J2	Performance Holiday; More Than Friends
April 21, 2018	Music Café	TVB J2	Performance More Than Friends
November 10, 2018	TVB Sales Presentation 2019	TVB	

=== Hosting ===
Year	Show	Broadcasting Channel	Note
2015	Music Power	TVB	
May 2016	Entertainment News	TVB	Cantonese Entertainment News presenter
January 28, 2017–February 11, 2017	Fun Abroad Season 2	TVB	Host for Episode 29-31

== Awards and nominations ==
Year	Nominated work	Category	Award	Result	Notes	Ref.
2017	"How Can I Do"	Jade Solid Gold Songs	Jade Solid Gold Songs Selection	Nominated	Round 2	
2017	—N/a	Most Promising New Artist	40th RTHK Top 10 Gold Songs Awards	Bronze Award		
2017	"How Can I Do"	Jade Solid Gold Songs	Jade Solid Gold Best Ten Music Awards Presentation	Nominated		
2017	—N/a	Most Popular Newcomer	Jade Solid Gold Best Ten Music Awards Presentation	Bronze Award		
2018	"More Than Friends"	Jade Solid Gold Songs	Jade Solid Gold Songs Selection	Won	Round 1	
2018	"Holiday"	Jade Solid Gold Songs	Jade Solid Gold Songs Selection	Nominated	Round 1	
2018	"Once Again"	Best Soundtrack	TVB Awards Presentation 2018	Nominated		
2019	"More Than Friends"	Jade Solid Gold Best Songs	Jade Solid Gold Best Ten Music Awards Presentation	Nominated		
2019	"Holiday"	Jade Solid Gold Best Songs	Jade Solid Gold Best Ten Music Awards Presentation	Nominated		
2019	—N/a	Rising Artist of the Year	Jade Solid Gold Best Ten Music Awards Presentation	Silver Award		
2019	"Once Again"	Jade Solid Gold Songs	Jade Solid Gold Songs Selection	Won	Round 1	
