= A Change of Destiny =

2007 Hong Kong costume drama TV series

- 天機算
- Genre: Costume Drama
- Starring: Steven Ma; Benny Chan; Shirley Yeung; Selena Lee; Yuen Wah; Mimi Lo; Rebecca Chan; Joel Chan
- Opening theme: "天數" by Steven Ma & Joel Chan
- Country of origin: Hong Kong
- Original language: Cantonese
- No. of episodes: 20

Production
- Running time: 45 minutes (approx.)

Original release
- Network: TVB
- Release: April 16 – May 11, 2007

A Change of Destiny (Traditional Chinese: 天機算) is a TVB costume drama series broadcast in April 2007.

The series is about two young men having the same birthday but have both of them have a different life. Benny Chan is from a rich family while Steven Ma is poor and they both hope to change their destiny with tui bei tu.

== Synopsis ==
Yip Yeung (Benny Chan) is interested in knowing the future with the use of diagrams,"tui bei tu", passed on from the past. These diagrams have the ability to predict future events so that readers can find luck or escape tragedy. Yuen Hei (Steven Ma) tricks Yip Yeung into buying fake diagrams he had created, but is later confronted by Lee Sing-Tin (Yuen Wah).

Lee Sing-Tin sees potential in Yip Yeung and Yuen Hei. He takes them in as his apprentice to teach them about his knowledge on these diagrams. Yip Yeung later discovers that he is a royal blood from the descendant of the last royal throne. He attempts to use his prediction skills to take over the King's throne but only foresees tragedy in every way he is planning to change destiny...

== Cast ==
Note: Some of the characters' names are in Cantonese romanisation.

Cast	Role	Description
Steven Ma(馬浚偉)	Yuen Hei 袁喜	Fok Yee-Na's husband.Lee Sing-Tin's apprentice.Lives happy after with Fok Yee-Na and has descendants in the end
Benny Chan(陳浩民)	Yip Yeung 葉楊	Sam Yee's husband. Originally he was wealthy spoil brat and when his family lost their wealth due being framed for crimes by minor villains he soon become obsessed of being emperor when he found that his father was a royal prince of the Chai family from the Later Zhou dynasty which lead him to dark path. He and Fei Fung (princess) later have mental illness and taken care by Sam Yee on the country side Main villain
Shirley Yeung(楊思琦)	Fok Yee-Na / Lee Cho Kwan 霍伊娜/李楚君	Yuen Hei's wife Lee Sing Tin's daughter
Selena Li	Sum-yee 心怡	Chiu Fei's servant Yip Yeung's wife. Chiu Fei's servant/best friend
Yuen Wah	Lee Sing-Tin 李承天	Lee Chunfeng's descendant Yuen Chi-Gan's husband Fok Yee-Na(Lee Cho Kwan)'s father. Yuen Hei's mentor. Dies with Yuen Chi-Gan after being indirectly poison by Yip Yeung and Yuen Chi-Gan's senior brother.
Rebecca Chan	Yuen Chi-Gan 袁紫昕	Yuen Tiangang's 's descendant Lee Sing-Tin's wife Fok Yee Na(Lee Cho Kwan)'s mother. Dies with Lee Sing-Tin after being indirectly poison by Yip Yeung and Yuen Chi-Gan's senior brother.
Kwok Fung	Jiu Hung Yan 趙匡胤	The Emperor; Chiu Fei's father. , Former general who became emperor with help of Lee Sing-Tam translating a page of Tui bei tu . Became obsess of translating the remaining pages of Tui bei tu to find out the future of the Sung dynasty and his fate leading him to threaten and house arrest of Lee Sing-Tin and Yuen Chi-Gan.
Mimi Lo (羅敏莊)	Chiu Fei 趙菲	Princess. In love with Yip Yeung . Got mental illness .Married Siu Kok Wah and later on Yip Yeung. Best friends with Sam Yee
Joel Chan (陳山聰)	Siu Kok-Wah 蕭覺樺	A spoiled son of a general and enemy of Yip Yeung. The Princess's first husband but was later on killed. Minor Villain
Tsui Wing ( 徐榮 (演員))	Jiu Kuangyi 赵匡义	Prince of Jin; Younger brother of the current emperor Uncle of Chiu Fei; Secretly want to seized throne and become the next emperor in line. Secondary Main villain

== Viewership ratings ==
	Week	Episode	Average Points	Peaking Points	References
1	April 16–20, 2007	1—5	29	—	
2	April 23–27, 2007	6—10	29	—	
3	April 30 - May 4, 2007	11—15	30	—	
4	May 7–11, 2007	16—20	30	—	

== Awards and nominations ==
40th TVB Anniversary Awards (2007)

- "Best Drama"
- "Best Actress in a Supporting Role" (Mimi Lo - Chiu Fei)
