= Barrack O'Karma =

Hong Kong television series

- 金宵大厦
- Genre: Supernatural; Romance
- Written by: Ruby Law Pui-ching
- Screenplay by: Ruby Law Pui-ching; Tsang Po-wa; Yeung Suet-yi; Yu Ka-koon; Yeung Yan-wing
- Starring: Joel Chan; Selena Lee; Samantha Ko; Kelly Cheung; Zoie Tam; Stephen Wong; Jazz Lam; Lau Kong; Geoffrey Wong; Gloria Tang; Akina Hong; Billy Luk; Candice Chiu; Bob Cheung
- Theme music composer: Wong Fuk-ling
- Opening theme: Goodbye (今宵多珍重) by Kayee Tam (Cantonese version)
- Ending theme: Goodbye (今宵多珍重) by Vivian Koo (Mandarin version)
- Original language: Cantonese
- No. of episodes: 20

Production
- Executive producer: Yip Chun-fai
- Producers: Monica Chin; Jennifer Ho Lok-yin; Leung Kai-ching; Tsang Wing-sze; Lam Hang
- Running time: 45 minutes
- Production company: TVB

Original release
- Network: TVB
- Release: 16 September – 13 October 2019

Related
- Barrack O'Karma 1968 (2022)

Barrack O'Karma (Chinese: 金宵大廈; lit. Twilight Mansion) is a 2019 Hong Kong supernatural romantic drama television series. It stars Joel Chan and Selena Lee as a pair of star-crossed lovers, with Samantha Ko, Kelly Cheung, Zoie Tam, Stephen Wong, Jazz Lam, Lau Kong, Geoffrey Wong and Gloria Tang in the supporting roles. The series made its premiere on 16 September 2019 on TVB. The series was renewed for a second season, titled Barrack O'Karma 1968, premiered on 4 April 2022.

The drama takes inspiration from the Champagne Court located in Tsim Sha Tsui, Hong Kong. Creator Ruby Law was inspired by the Mandarin song "Jin Xiao Duo Zhen Zhong" (Chinese: 今宵多珍重) to write a story about a man and a woman who sees each other in their dreams. Barrack O'Karma has central themes of a parallel universe, Mandela effect, and the butterfly effect. The series features 10 sub-plots about characters that live or work in the building. Principal photography began in February 2018 and concluded in June.

Barrack O'Karma was nominated for six awards at the 2019 TVB Anniversary Awards and won three, including Best Supporting Actress for Candice Chiu, Most Popular Female Character for Selena Lee, and Most Popular Onscreen Partnership for Joel Chan and Selena Lee.

== Synopsis ==
Throughout his life, unambitious Siu Wai-ming (Joel Chan) always has dreams of a woman in a qi pao. He is hired as a security guard at the old and decrepit Twilight Mansion by book store owner Lam Yeuk-sze (Lau Kong), who is the chairman of the building's committee. Siu encounters flight stewardess Alex Cheung (Selena Lee), who appears just like the woman in his dreams. Meanwhile, the building seems to have supernatural powers over its tenants and strange things happen, leading to changes in their lives. Back in the 1960s, escort Coco Yeung (Selena Lee) worked at the Twilight Nightclub located in the basement of Twilight Mansion. She dreamt that she became a flight stewardess and had fallen in love with a man who resembles Lau Yuk-fai (Joel Chan), a policeman she met at the night club. Her dreams were written into a book by young Lam Yeuk-sze (Bob Cheung). In present day, Siu discovers the book and the truth behind his destined romance with Alex.

== Cast ==
- Joel Chan as Siu Wai-ming and Lau Yuk-fai
- Selena Lee as Alex Cheung Wai and Coco Yeung Yuk-wah
- Samantha Ko as Chow Siu-wai
- Kelly Cheung as Kelly Cheung Hei-man (herself)
- Zoie Tam as Carmen Fong Ka-man
- Stephen Wong as Ho Sai-hin
- Jazz Lam as Yuen Ka-koon
- Lau Kong as Lam Yeuk-sze
  - Bob Cheung as young adult Lam
- Geoffrey Wong as Wan Chi-kai
- Gloria Tang as Wan Ching
- Akina Hong as Yuki Kut Suet
- Billy Luk as Choi San
- Candice Chiu as Wong Man-yi
- Tammy Au-yeung as Mia Sum Heung-lin (Baby Mia)
- Mark Ma as Lee Ka-chun
- Kirby Lam (voice guest) as Simone
- Rosina Lam (guest appearance) as Dr. Poon Dor-lai

== Reception ==
=== Critical response ===
The drama series was positively received by viewers. It has a 8.5/10 rating on Douban. Barrack O'Karma was praised for its original and thrilling story line. It was the third-most viewed TVB drama in 2019.

=== Accolades ===
At the 2019 TVB Anniversary Awards, Selena Lee won the Most Popular Female Character award for her dual role as Alex/Coco. Lee and Joel Chan were awarded the Most Popular Onscreen Partnership award, and Candice Chiu won the Best Supporting Actress award. The series was nominated for Best Drama (Top 3), and Chan and Lee were nominated for Best Actor (Top 5) and Best Actress (Top 5) respectively.

Year	Award	Category	Nominated work	Results	Ref.
2021	New York Festivals TV & Film Awards	Best Performance By An Actress (finalist)	Selena Lee	Won	
