= Helen Ma (actress) =

Hong Kong actress (born 1947)

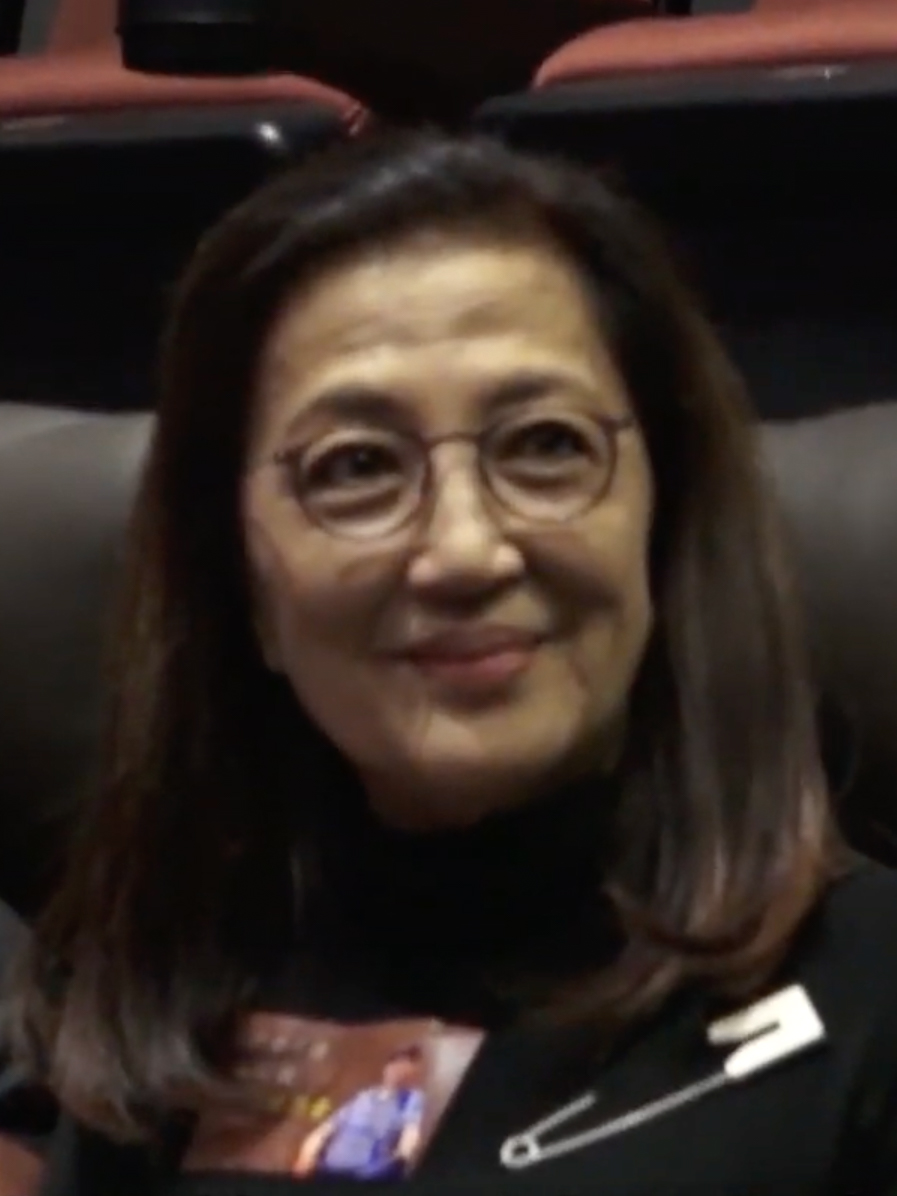
- Ma attending the memorial service for Ngok Wah on 20 November 2018.
- Born: November 28, 1948 (age 77); British Hong Kong

Helen Ma (馬海倫, born November 28, 1948) is a Hong Kong actress. Beginning her career in the Hong Kong movie industry since the 1960s, she is known to have appeared in various Hong Kong produced movies and dramas. Ma is currently an actress under television broadcast TVB.

== Awards ==
- Outstanding Artiste Award at the TVB Awards Presentation 2013

== Filmography ==
- The Cave of the Silken Web (1967)
- King Cat (1967)
- The Silver Fox
- Deaf and Mute Heroine (1971)
- The Fate of Lee Khan (1973)
- Dream of Red Mansion (1977)
- The Duke of Mount Deer (1977)
- Song Bird (1989)
- The War Heroes 天变 (1989) as Pan Siu Dip "Little Butterfly"
- Man from Guangdong (1991)
- Drifters (1991)
- Super Cop (1992)
- All About Tin (1993)
- A Kindred Spirit (1995)
- The Condor Heroes 95 (1995)
- Demi-Gods and Semi-Devils (1997 TV series)
- Armed Reaction (1998, as Ho Kam Mui)
- Before Dawn (1998)
- Happy Ever After (1999)
- Man's Best Friend (2000)
- Armed Reaction II (2000, as Ho Kam Mui)
- Return of the Cuckoo (2000)
- Armed Reaction III (2001, as Ho Kam Mui)
- Virtues of Harmony (2001, as Chan Kiu)
- Virtues of Harmony II (2003)
- Armed Reaction IV (2004, as Ho Kam Mui)
- Real Kung Fu (2005)
- The Dance of Passion (2006, as Gwai Lan)
- At Home with Love (2006)
- Life Art (2007)
- A Change of Destiny (2007)
- A Journey Called Life (2008, as Yeung Dai-Fun)
- Speech of Silence (2008)
- Legend of the Demigods (2008)
- The Gem of Life (2008, as Margaret Sung-Kwok)
- When Easterly Showers Fall on the Sunny West (2008)
- Rosy Business (2009, as Ngan Yuk-hing
- Burning Flame III (2009, as Lee Mei Lan)
- Cupid Stupid (2010, as Lam So Ngo
- A Fistful of Stances (2010, as Chan Kiu
- Fly with Me (2010, as Jiu Fung Hing)
- Transferred Connection Temptation (2010)
- The Mind Reading Detective (2010)
- Every Move You Make (2010)
- No Regrets (2010, as Chow Tit)
- Links to Temptation (2010-2011, as Leung Kwai-fan)
- Only You (2011, as Wong Mei-ho
- Be Home for Dinner(2011, as Dau Kwai-lam)
- The Other Truth (2011, as Cheng Suk-kuen)
- The Life and Times of a Sentinel (2011. as Ko Choi-king)
- The Confidant (2012, as Tujin Kwai-so)
- The Day of Days (2013, as Wong Mei-ling)
- Missing You (2013)
- Outbound Love (2014, as Lei Lai Sze)
- Storm in a Cocoon (2014)
- Come Home Love 2 (2015)
- Every Step You Take (2015)
- My Ages Apart (2017)
- I Bet Your Pardon (2019)
- On-Lie Game (2020)
