= Andrew Yuen Man-kit =

Hong Kong actor, presenter, and model

Andrew Yuen
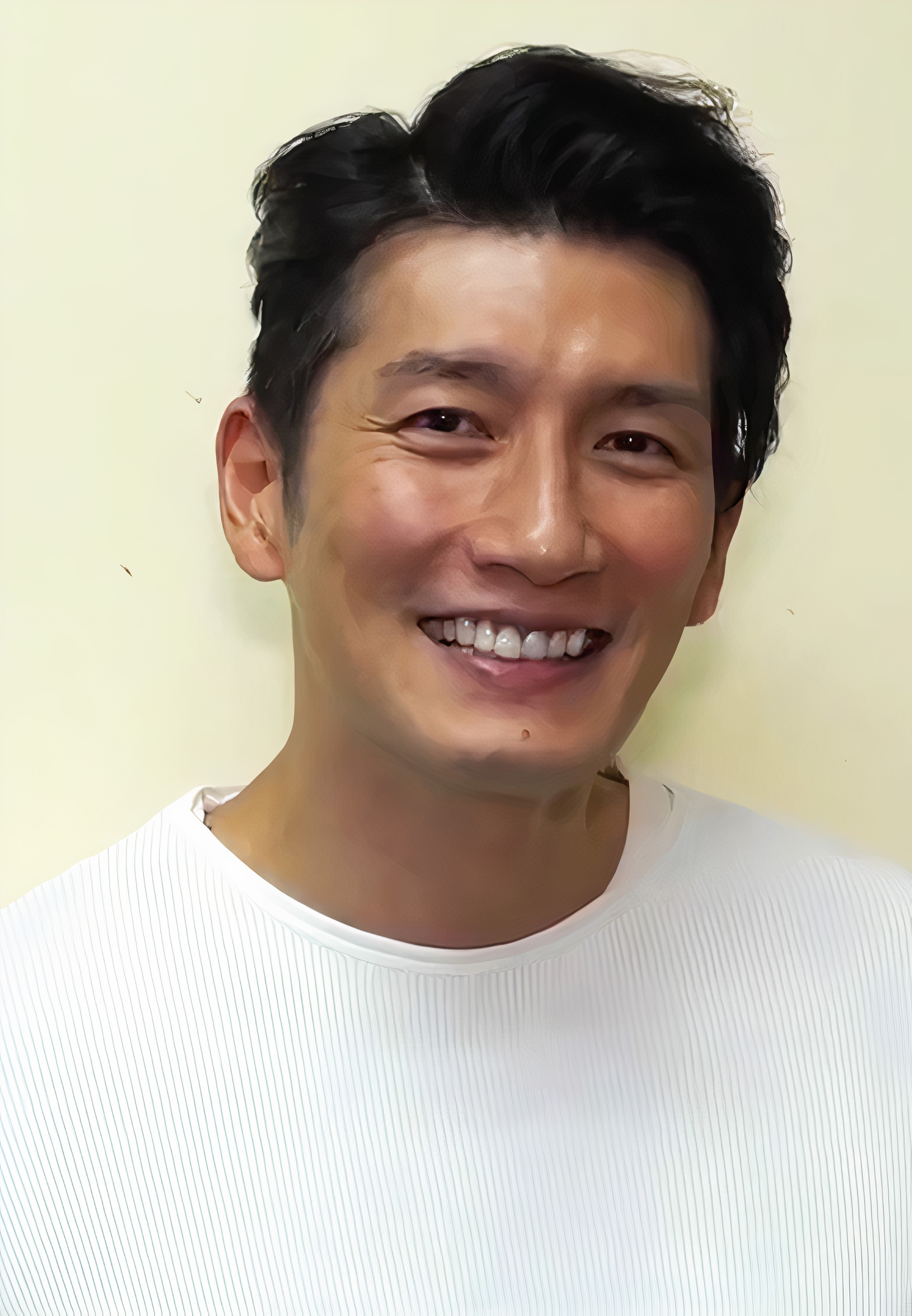
- Andrew Yuen Man-kit
- Born: 28 January 1969 (age 57); Hong Kong
- Occupations: Actor, model and presenter
- Years active: 1990–present
- Height: 1.89 m (6 ft 2 1/2 in)
- Partner: Jackeline Cheung

Chinese name
- Traditional Chinese: 袁文傑
- Simplified Chinese: 袁文杰
Transcriptions

Andrew Yuen Man-kit (born 28 January 1969) is a Hong Kong actor, model and presenter.
