= David Do =

American government official

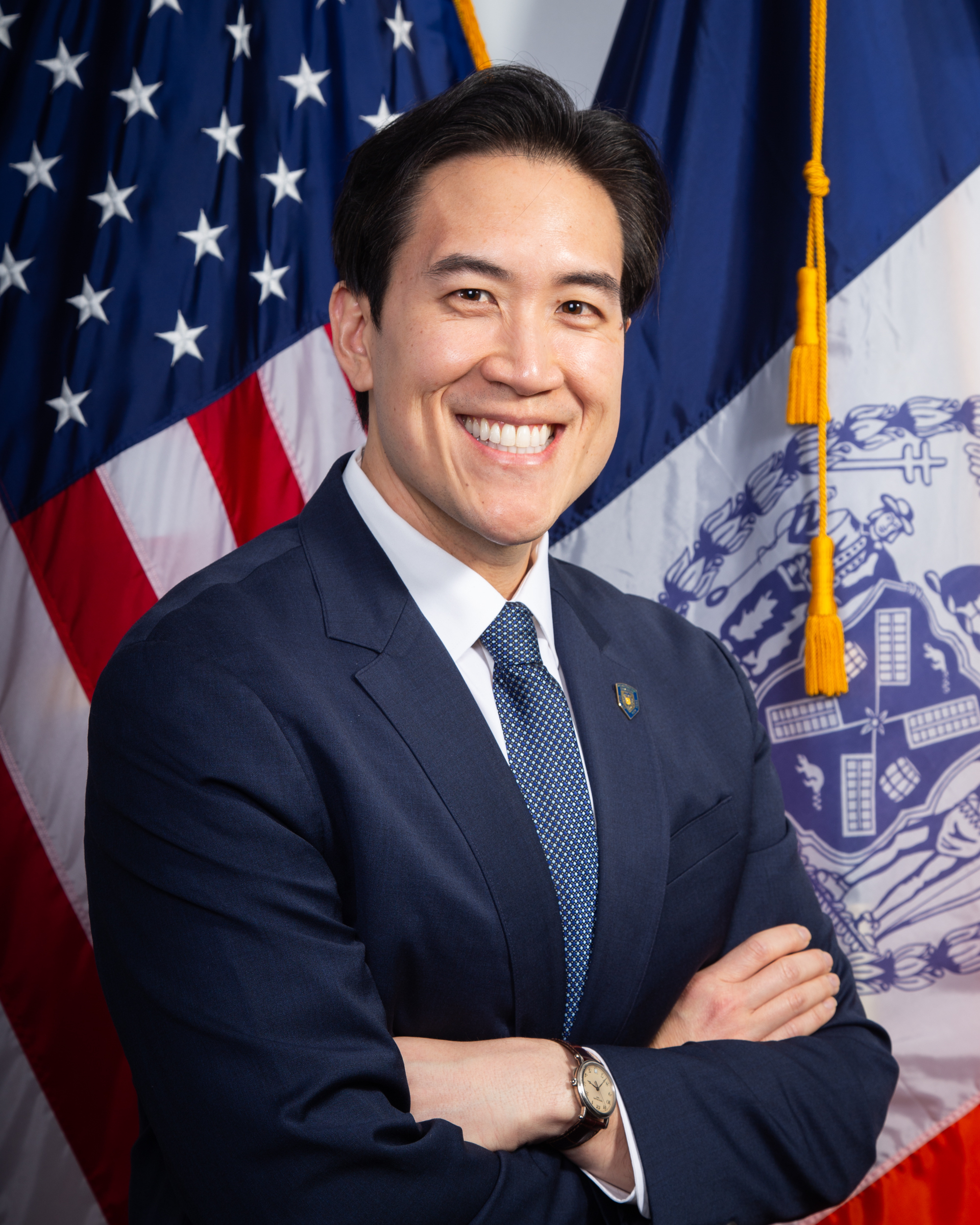
- Do in 2024

Chair and Commissioner of the New York City Taxi and Limousine Commission
- In office May 19, 2022 – February 15, 2026
- Mayors: Eric Adams; Zohran Mamdani
- Preceded by: Aloysee Heredia Jarmoszuk
- Succeeded by: Midori Valdivia

Personal details
- Education: University of California, Merced (BA); University of Maryland, College Park (MA)

David Do is an American government official who is the former Chair and Commissioner of the New York City Taxi and Limousine Commission. He was appointed by Mayor Eric Adams on May 19, 2022.

He previously served as the Director of the Department of For-Hire Vehicles (DFHV) in Washington, D.C., where he implemented various initiatives to improve the for-hire vehicle industry. These initiatives included launching DC Microtransit, an on-demand shuttle service, and creating a centralized dispatch platform for wheelchair-accessible taxis.

Do's career in public service also includes his role as the Director of the Washington, D.C. Mayor’s Office on Asian and Pacific Islander Affairs. In this position, he worked to enhance the quality of life for Asian Americans and Pacific Islanders in the district. His efforts in the LGBTQ+ community earned him the Catalyst Award from the National Queer Asian Pacific Islander Association in 2019.

== Leadership at the TLC ==
As TLC Commissioner and Chair, Do has been tasked with navigating the challenges faced by New York City's taxi and for-hire vehicle industries in the wake of the COVID-19 pandemic and the ongoing medallion debt crisis. His leadership is characterized by a focus on innovation, accessibility, and equity.

During his confirmation hearing, Do emphasized his commitment to improving driver pay and protections, supporting the integration of electric vehicles (EVs), and enhancing accessibility within the TLC fleet. He highlighted the importance of increasing the number of trips and diversifying how taxis receive trips, particularly through partnerships like Uber's collaboration with Curb and Arro.

== Key initiatives and priorities ==
=== Driver pay and protections ===
Do supports raising metered fares for yellow cabs, which had not seen an increase since 2012, and maintaining New York City's minimum payment rules for Uber and Lyft drivers. He has advocated for additional support services for drivers, including financial, legal, and mental health services.

=== Electric vehicles ===
Do aims to promote the adoption of EVs within the TLC-licensed industries. He supports incentives and infrastructure development to facilitate this transition.

=== Accessibility ===
Enhancing the accessibility of taxis and for-hire vehicles is a top priority for Do. He plans to find additional funding sources to increase the availability of wheelchair-accessible vehicles (WAVs) and support initiatives that incentivize their use.

=== Community and industry support ===
David Do's nomination and subsequent confirmation received strong support from various stakeholders within the taxi and for-hire vehicle industries. Leaders such as Bhairavi Desai of the New York Taxi Workers Alliance and Ira Goldstein of the New York Black Car Fund have expressed optimism about his ability to lead the TLC and support the industry's recovery and growth.

== Post-TLC Career ==
In March 2026, it was announced that Do would be leaving his current position with the city and will be joining the Empower ride-hailing company as Senior Vice President of Government and Regulatory Affairs. However, later in the same month, he announced that he would not be taking the role.

== Awards & Accolades ==
Transportation Power 100 City & State New York, August 2022

40 Under Forty, Crain's New York Business, November 2022

Power Of Diversity: Asian 100 City & State New York, May 2023

Transportation Power 100 City & State New York, August 2023

Trailblazers In Clean Energy City & State New York, April 2024

Power Of Diversity: Asian 100 City & State New York, May 2024

Transportation Power 100 City & State New York, July 2024

The 2024 NYC 40 Under 40 The rising stars of city politics and government. City & State New York, October 2024
