= Selena Lee (actor) =

Chinese Canadian actress

- 李施嬅
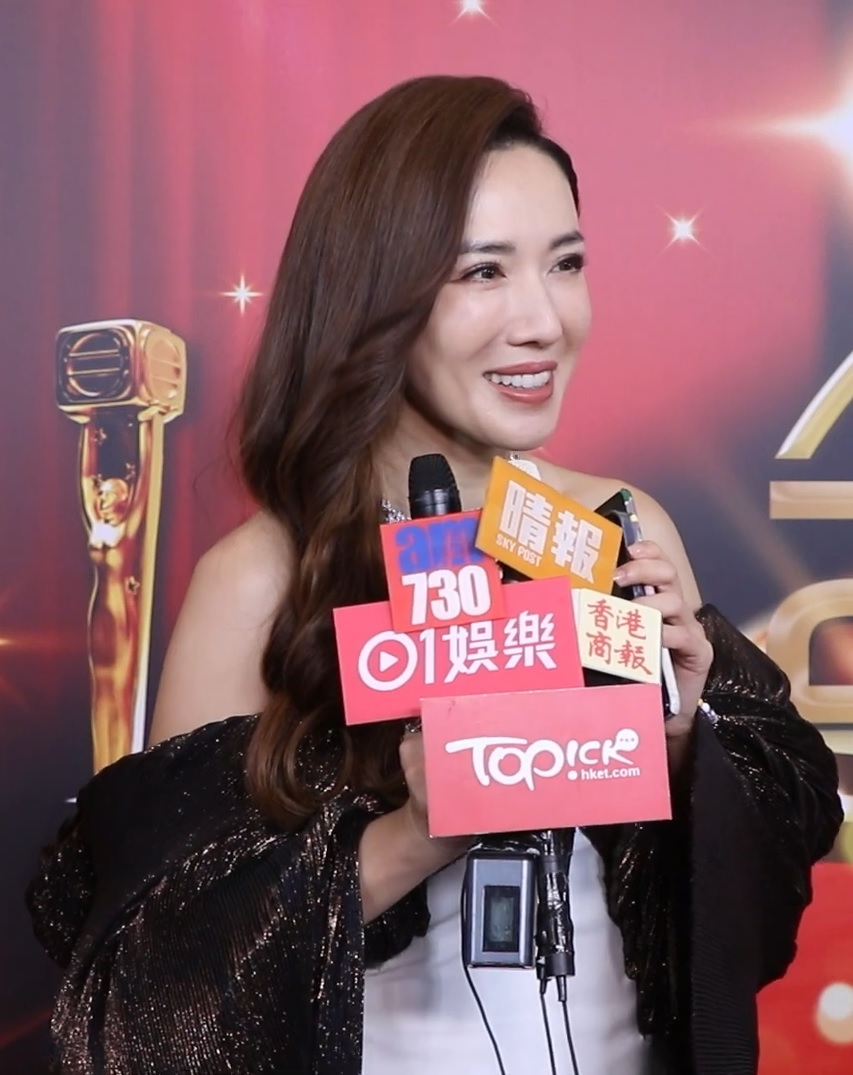
- Lee in 2024
- Born: Lee Sze-wa; British Hong Kong
- Citizenship: Canada
- Education: University of Toronto
- Occupations: Actress; singer
- Years active: 2003–present
- Notable work: Once More; Barrack O'Karma series The QUEEN of News
- Awards: 2003 Miss Hong Kong Miss Photogenic & Miss Talent StarHub TVB Awards – Most Improved TVB Artiste; 2012 European Cinematography Awards – Best Actress; 2017 Once More Los Angeles Film Awards – Best Actress; 2017 Once More TVB Anniversary Awards – Most Popular Female Character; 2019 Barrack O'Karma (tied win with Miriam Yeung); Most Popular Onscreen Partnership; 2019 Barrack O'Karma (shared with Joel Chan) People's Choice Television Awards – Best Actress; 2019 Barrack O'Karma 2021 New York Festivals TV and Film Awards – Best Actress - Credit Award; 2019 Barrack O'Karma

Chinese name
- Chinese: 李施嬅
Transcriptions
Standard Mandarin
- Hanyu Pinyin: Lǐ Shīhuà
Yue: Cantonese
- Jyutping: Lei5 Si1 Wa6

Chinese name
- Chinese: 李詩韻
Transcriptions
Standard Mandarin
- Hanyu Pinyin: Lǐ Shīyùn
Yue: Cantonese
- Jyutping: Lei5 Si1 Wan5
- Website: YouTube Channel

Selena Lee Sze-wa (Chinese: 李施嬅), former stage name Selena Lee Sze-Wan (Chinese: 李詩韻), is a Hong Kong-born actress and former beauty pageant contestant.

After participating in the 2003 Miss Hong Kong Pageant, Lee had signed an artiste contract with TVB and filmed numerous TVB dramas. She left TVB in 2019 and announced in May 2019 that she will be managed by American talent agency Authentic for work in North America. In September 2019, Lee earned critical acclaim for her dual role as Alex and Coco in the supernatural romance drama Barrack O'Karma and won the Most Popular Female Character award at the TVB Anniversary Awards. In June 2020, she signed an artiste contract with Shaw Brothers Pictures for work in Hong Kong and South-Eastern Asia.

== Early life ==
Born in Hong Kong, Selena Lee immigrated with her parents to Toronto in 1988. She attended the University of Toronto, earning a Bachelor of Business Commerce with major in Accounting in 2010.

Lee had also had achieved Grade 8 piano.

== Career ==
Selena Lee entered the 2003 Miss Hong Kong Pageant as an overseas contestant, winning Miss Photogenic and Miss Talent. She subsequently signed with the broadcasting giant TVB and made her acting debut in the drama The Last Breakthrough (Chinese: 天涯俠醫).

In 2014, Lee portrayed Jessica Tan in the Singaporean sitcom Spouse for House. She won the credit award for best actress in comedy in Asian Television Award.

In 2017, Lee won the Best Actress awards at the European Cinematography Awards and Los Angeles Film Awards with her role in the American short film Once More.

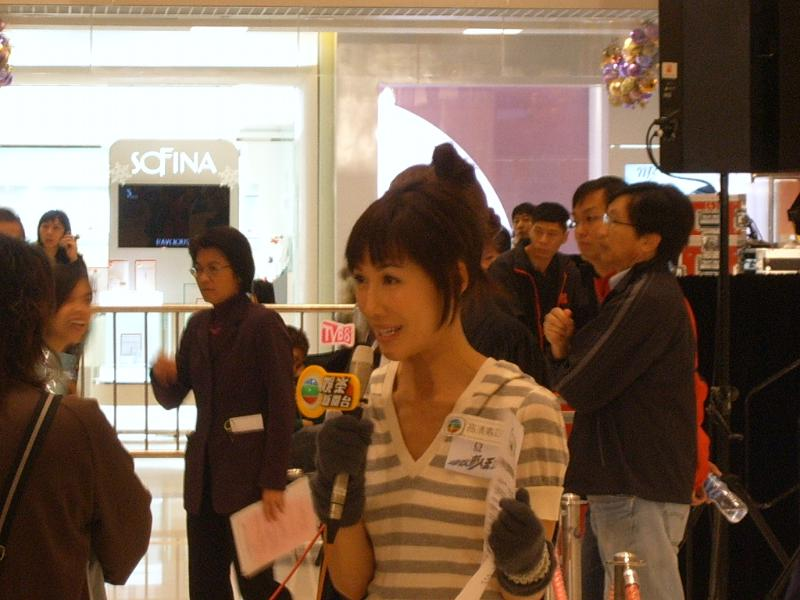
Lee in 2007

In 2018, Lee participated in Canadian television crime drama Blood and Water (Chinese: 血與水) for which she was nominated for Best Supporting Actress at the 7th Canadian Screen Awards.

In April 2019, Lee announced that she would not be renewing her contract with TVB, with intentions to pursue opportunities internationally. It was announced in May 2019 that she would be managed by American talent agency Authentic for work in North America.

In September 2019, Lee portrayed the 2010s flight attendant Alex Cheung and the 1960s hostess Coco Yeung in the TVB supernatural drama Barrack O'Karma (Chinese: 金宵大廈), for which she earned critical acclaim and became a strong contender for Best Actress. At the 2019 TVB Anniversary Awards, she won the Most Popular Onscreen Partnership award with her Barrack O'Karma co-actor Joel Chan. Nominated for the fourth time for Most Popular Female Character, Lee won the award alongside Miriam Yeung for her dual role as Alex and Coco. She was placed among the top 5 nominees for Best Actress as well.

Lee's last drama at TVB, Forensic Heroes IV (Chinese: 法證先鋒IV), aired in February 2020. She released her first single, Second Love, with her Forensic Heroes IV co-actor Gabriel Harrison and won music awards for the single. Lee signed an artiste contract with Shaw Brothers Pictures for work in Hong Kong and South-Eastern Asia as well. In August 2020, she returned to TVB to film the sequel Barrack O'Karma 1968 (Chinese: 金宵大廈2). The drama was aired in April 2022. She is the only one who entered top 5 for both TVB Anniversary Awards 2022 best actress and most favorite best actress in Malaysia category. Both drama series entered the finalist of best actress in a leading role in Asian Television Awards and People's Choice Television Award in 2020 and 2022 respectively.

She released her first album in September 2022 and completed the filming of the remaking international film - Tape.

In 2023, She filmed The Queen of News and entered top 5 for both TVB Anniversary Awards 2023 best actress and most favorite best actress in Malaysia and Greater Bay Area category. She has also been nominated for the People's Choice Television Award in best actress category.

== Personal life ==
In 2015, Lee announced on her Weibo blog that she had decided to change her Chinese stage name, Lee Sze Wan (李詩韻), back to her birth name, Lee Sze Wa (李施嬅), in memory of her grandmother, who had died that year.

Selena Lee is best friends with Myolie Wu, Nancy Wu, Paisley Wu, Elaine Yiu and Mandy Wong. They had formed the friendship group “胡說八道會” and filmed a travel show together.

Due to their common interest in long-distance running, Lee along with Benjamin Yuen, Joel Chan, Brian Tse, Jack Wu, Nancy Wu, Paisley Wu, Elaine Yiu and Mandy Wong formed the group "Crazy Runner".

Lee was in a relationship with singer Patrick Tang from 2004 to 2009.

In February 2021, Lee announced via social media that she is engaged to Anson Cha, a fitness coach and personal trainer. In February 2025, she announced they had ended their relationship.

On 31 March 2022, Lee revealed that she has autoimmune disease. She has stopped working since late 2021 and is currently receiving treatment.

== Filmography ==
=== Film and television ===
Title	Year	Role	Notes/Ref.
The Last Breakthrough	2004	Shirley Fong Suet-yee (方雪兒)	Supporting Role
Just Love	2005	Yoyo Leung Yan-yan (梁昕昕)	Supporting Role; Nominiated in 2005 TVB Anniversary Awards Best Supporting Actress; Nominated in 2005 TVB Anniversary Awards Most Improved Female Artiste
Life Made Simple	2005	Joanna Yeung Yuen-kwan (楊婉君)	Supporting Role
Real Kung Fu	2005	Fuchat Ho-yuet (富察·皓月)	Supporting Role; Nominiated in 2005 TVB Anniversary Awards Best Supporting Actress; Nominated in 2005 TVB Anniversary Awards Most Improved Female Artiste (Top 10)
The Herbalist's Manual	2005	Ng Mo-yung (吳慕榕)	2nd Main Role; Nominated in 2006 TVB Anniversary Awards Most Improved Female Artiste (Top 5)
Face to Fate	2006	Yin Ye-loi (嫣夜來)	2nd Main Role
To Grow with Love	2006	Maggie Kwok Bo-lok (郭寶樂)	Supporting Role; Nominated in 2006 TVB Anniversary Awards Most Improved Female Artiste (Top 5)
A Change of Destiny	2007	Sum-yee (心怡)	Supporting Role; Nominated in 2007 TVB Anniversary Awards Most Improved Female Artiste (Top 10)
On the First Beat	2007	Yip Ling-fung (葉玲鳳)	Supporting Role
Survivor's Law II	2007	Cheng Choi-yuk (鄭彩玉)	Supporting Role; Nominated in 2008 TVB Anniversary Awards Most Improved Female Artiste (Top 5)
The Master of Tai Chi	2008	Yin Chui-kiu (言翠翹)	Supporting Role; Nominated in 2008 TVB Anniversary Awards Most Improved Female Artiste (Top 5)
The Seventh Day	2008	Miko Yuen Ching (阮靜)	Supporting Role; Nominated in 2008 TVB Anniversary Awards Most Improved Female Artiste (Top 5)
Forensic Heroes II	2008	"Cat" Lee Kiu (李蕎)	Ep.25–28; Nominated in 2008 TVB Anniversary Awards Most Improved Female Artiste (Top 5)
The Four	2008	Lam Yeuk-fei (藍若飛)	2nd Main Role; Nominated in 2008 TVB Anniversary Awards Most Improved Female Artiste (Top 5)
When Easterly Showers Fall on the Sunny West	2008	Fong Bo-kei (方寶琦)	Supporting Role
Just Love II	2009	Yoyo Leung Yan-yan (梁昕昕)	Supporting Role
Beyond the Realm of Conscience	2009	Man Bo-yin / Consort Yin (萬寶賢 – 賢妃)	Major Supporting Role; Nominiated in 2009 TVB Anniversary Awards Best Supporting Actress; Nominated in 2009 TVB Anniversary Awards Most Improved Female Artiste (Top 5)
A Fistful of Stances	2010	Angel Wing Tsz-ching (榮芷晴)	Major Supporting Role; Nominated in 2010 TVB Anniversary Awards Most Improved Female Artiste (Top 5)
Can't Buy Me Love	2010	Yuen Siu-yuk (阮小玉)	Supporting Role; Nominated in 2010 TVB Anniversary Awards Most Improved Female Artiste (Top 5)
The Life and Times of a Sentinel	2011	Cheuk Chi-ying (卓紫凝)/ Princess Duen-man (愛新覺羅·端敏 – 格格)	1st Main Role; Nominated in 2011 TVB Anniversary Awards Best Actress; Nominated MY AOD Favorite Awards 2011 Best Supporting Actress, My Favourite Most Promising Female Artiste (Top 5)
Wish and Switch	2012	Hailey Hou Yurk-hoi (侯若海)	2nd Main Role StarHub TVB Award for Most Improved Female Artiste; StarHub TVB Award for My Favourite TVB Female Characters; Won Star Hub TVB Awards 2012 Most Improved TVB Artiste; Nominated Star Hub TVB Awards 2012 My Favourite TVB Female Characters
Gloves Come Off	2012	Donna Chai Pak-fai (齊柏暉)	1st Main Role; StarHub TVB Award for Most Improved Female Artiste; Won Star Hub TVB Awards 2012 Most Improved TVB Artiste; Nominated My AOD Favorite Awards 2012 My Favourite Drama Characters, My Favourite Onscreen Couple (with Kevin Cheng) (Top 10)
The Confidant	2012	Imperial Consort Yuen (索綽絡•婉 – 婉太嬪)	Guest Appearance (5 episodes)
Slow Boat Home	2013	Heidi Hei-man Kwok (郭希雯)	2nd Main Role; Nominated Star Hub TVB Awards 2013 My Favourite TVB Female Characters; Nominated Star Hub TVB Awards 2013 My Favourite TVB Female Artiste; Nominated Star Hub TVB Awards 2013 My Favourite TVB Female Artiste
Awfully Lawful	2013	Elsa Chung Lai-sa (鍾麗莎)	2nd Main Role
Spouse for House	2014	Jessica Tan	1st Main Role Singapore — Mediacorp Channel 5 Sitcom; 19th Asian Television Awards - Best Comedy Performance by an Actor/Actress - Highly Commended
Ghost Dragon of Cold Mountain	2014	To Fa (桃花) / Yan Mei-leung (殷媚娘)	1st Main Role Won TVB Star Award Malaysia for Top 15 Favourite Drama Characters; Nominated TVB Star Award Malaysia Best Actress; Nominated TVB Anniversary Awards 2014 Best Actress, Most Popular Female Character (Top 10)
Master of Destiny	2015	young Kwan Yeuk-nam	Guest Appearance
Brick Slaves	2015	Choi Kin-ching (蔡堅菁)	1st Main Role TVB Star Award Malaysia for Top 16 Favourite Drama Characters StarHub TVB Award for My Favourite TVB Female Characters; Nominated TVB Anniversary Awards 2015 Best Actress, Most Popular Female Character; Nominated for People's Choice Television Award for Best Actress (Top 5)
Spouse for House 2	2015	Jessica Tan	1st Main Role; Singapore — Mediacorp Channel 5 Sitcom
Presumed Accidents	2016	Faye Lin Yeuk-fei (凌若菲)/ Chong Wing-yee (莊穎兒)/ Princess Yuet Ngar (月牙公主)	Guest Appearance StarHub TVB Award for My Favourite TVB Female TV Characters; Nominated TVB Anniversary Awards 2016 Best Actress, Most Popular Female Character
Succession War	2018	Empress Xiaoherui (孝和睿皇后)	1st Main Role; Nominated TVB Anniversary Awards 2018 Best Actress, Most Popular Female Character, Most Favourite TVB Best Actress in Malaysia, NominatedPeople's Choice Television Award 2019 for Best Actress Top 5
Blood and Water	2018	Michelle Chang	Supporting Role; 7th Canadian Screen Award Best Supporting Actress Top 5
I Bet Your Pardon	2019	Marilyn Ma Lai-lin (瑪麗蓮)	2nd Main Role
Barrack O'Karma	2019	Alex Cheung Wai (章瑋)/ Coco Yeung Yuk-wah (楊玉嬅)	1st Main Role Won TVB Anniversary Award for Most Popular Female Character 2019(tied win with Miriam Yeung); Won TVB Anniversary Award for Most Popular Onscreen Partnership 2019 (shared with Joel Chan); Won People's Choice Television Award for Best Actress; Won New York Festivals Television and Film Awards 2021 for Best Actress - Credit Award; Nominated TVB Anniversary Awards 2019 Best Actress
Forensic Heroes IV	2020	Dr. Man Ka-hei (聞家希)	1st Main Role Nominated for Top 5 Best Actress in Leading Role in 25th Asian Television Award; Nominated TVB Anniversary Awards 2020 Best Actress, Most Popular Female Character; Nominated People's Choice Television Award 2020 for Best Actress, Best Acting Scene
Blood and Water Season 3 : Fire and Ice	2020	Michelle Chang	1st Main Role
Barrack O'Karma 1968	2022	Ella / Lydia / Psychiatrist	1st Main Role; Singing interlude song Love Forever 相愛萬年- Won 7th VIP Music Chart Hits Award Ceremony - VIP Best Performing Award - Gold/VIP Most Popular Creative Song Award; Nominated TVB Anniversary Awards 2022 Most Popular TV Soundtrack Nominated for Top 8 Best Actress in Leading Role in 27th Asian Television Award; Nominated TVB Anniversary Awards 2022 Best Actress Top 5, Most Favourite TVB Best Actress in Malaysia Top 5, Most Popular Onscreen Partnership 2019 (shared with Joel Chan), Most Popular Female Character; Nominated People's Choice Television Award for Best Actress/ Best On Screen Partnership/ Best Drama Theme Songs
The Queen of News	2023	Cheung Ka-yin Alice 張家妍	2nd Main Role; Nominated TVB Anniversary Awards 2022 Best Actress Top 5, Most Favourite TVB Best Actress in Malaysia Top 5, Most Favourite TVB Best Actress in Greater Bay Area Top 5 Nominated People's Choice Television Award for Best Actress/ Best On Screen Partnership, Won Youku Entertainment× the Queen of News Closing Ceremony, Most Representative Queen's Award
The Queen of News 2	2025	Cheung Ka-yin Alice	

Film	Year	Role	Notes/Ref.
Love Is...	2007	Vivian	Main Role
Murderer	2009	Hazel	Voice (Cantonese)
Don't Go Breaking My Heart	2011	pregnant woman	Cameo
Once More	2016	Selina	1st Main Role; 2017 European Cinematography Awards for Best Actress; 2017 Los Angeles Film Awards for Best Actress (Hollywood Short film)
Tape	2024 (expected)	Amy	1st Main Role

=== Variety shows ===
==== As host ====
Year	Name of show	Episodes	Other guests
2008	Living Up Season 6	All	Suki Chui, Maggie Cheung, Leanne Li
2010	Enoch's Footprint	3	
2011	Enoch's Footprint	6	
2014	Macao International Parade		
2016	A Starry Home Coming		
2016	Three Hungry Sisters	All 8	Paisley Wu, Samantha Ko
2017	Wellness On The Go	4	
2017	The Sisterhood Traveling Gang	1-6	
2017	Shall We Run		
2018	Miss Hong Kong 2018 (Judges Panel for Miss Photogenic)		
2019	All things Girl - Malaysia Edition	4	

==== As guest ====
Year	Name of show	Episodes	Other guests
2006	15/16	??	Francois Huynh, Otto Chan
2008	Fan and Kam 《范後感》	18 October 2008	Raymond Lam, Ron Ng, Kate Tsui, Kenneth Ma
2008	Lady's Talk 《三個女人一個墟》	??	Mandy Cho, Leanne Li
2009	Boom Boom Ba 《耳分高下》	15–16	Michael Tse, Bosco Wong, Kate Tsui
2009	Outsmart 《財智達人》	04	Sammul Chan, Nancy Wu, Lee Lung Kei
2010	Have Fun With Liza and Gods 《荃加福祿壽》	06	Angel Chiang, Denise Ho, Lee Yee Man, Benji Chiang
2010	Super Trio Game Master	20	Charmaine Sheh, Moses Chan, Kenneth Ma
2015	The Million Dollar Minute《超強選擇1分鐘》	12	Vincent Wong Ho Shun, Evergreen Mak Cheung-ching
2018	Cooking Beauties《美女廚房(第三輯)》	03	Nancy Wu, Venus Wong
2019	Liza's Online《娛樂大家 (無綫電視節目)》	04	Nancy Wu, Mandy Wong, Paisley Hu
2019	The Green Room《今日VIP》	187	Interviewed by Luisa Maria Leitão
2020	Cantopop at 50《流行經典50年》	02	Raymond Wong Ho-yin, Shaun Tam, Alice Chan, Roxanne Tong

== Endorsements ==
Year	Advertisement	Ref.
2010	Vaseline Skincare 護膚教室	
2010	Ocean Park 海洋公園甜蜜蜜大團拜 黃宗澤、李詩韻、游茛維	
2011	Vaseline 護膚教室	
2012	Vaseline Aloe Vera 蘆薈保濕	
2016	Méthode SWISS	
2017	Méthode SWISS 全新雪絨花系列（湖畔篇）	
2019	AXA安盛智尊守慧醫療保障	
2021	Eucerin 護膚精華液	
2021	李施嬅 X Thermage® FLX 煥然肌齡 煥新里程	
2022	維特健靈 Vita Green「滋寶奇珍」	

== Discography ==
Album No#	Album	Type	Company	Released Date	Track
1st	李施嬅 Selena Lee	EP	Sky Team Entertainment	9 September 2022	1. Forever Love 相愛萬年; 2. Second Love 二次緣 (With Gabriel Harrison)

=== Singles ===
Peak chart positions
Title	903	RTHK	997	TVB	Fairchild Radio (Canada)
2020
"Second Love" (二次緣) – Collaboration with Gabriel Harrison (海俊傑)	–	–	14*	–	9*
2022
"Love Forever" (相愛萬年) 電視劇《金宵大廈2》插曲	-	14	5	6	10

== Awards and nominations ==
Year	Type	Result	Award
2004	Chik Chak TV Awards	Top 5	Newcomer Award
2005	TVB Anniversary Awards	Nominated	Best Supporting Actress
2005	TVB Anniversary Awards	Top 5	Most Improved Female Artiste
2006	Next Magazine TV Awards	Nominated	Best New Actress
2006	TVB Anniversary Awards	Nominated	Best Supporting Actress
2006	TVB Anniversary Awards	Top 5	Most Improved Female Artiste
2007	TVB Anniversary Awards	Top 5	Most Improved Female Artiste
2008	TVB Anniversary Awards	Top 5	Most Improved Female Artiste
2009	TVB Anniversary Awards	Nominated	Best Supporting Actress
2009	TVB Anniversary Awards	Nominated	TVB.com Popularity Award
2010	TVB Anniversary Awards	Nominated	Best Supporting Actress
2010	TVB Anniversary Awards	Top 5	Most Improved Female Artiste
2010	TVB Anniversary Awards	Nominated	TVB.com Popularity Award
2011	My AOD Favourite Awards	Nominated	My Favourite Supporting Actress
2011	My AOD Favourite Awards	Top 5	My Favourite Most Promising Female Artiste
2011	TVB Anniversary Awards	Nominated	Best Actress
2012	My AOD Favourite Awards	Nominated	My Favourite Drama Characters
2012	My AOD Favourite Awards	Nominated	My Favourite Onscreen Couple (with Kevin Cheng)
2012	StarHub TVB Awards	Won	Most Improved TVB Artiste
2012	StarHub TVB Awards	Won	My Favourite TVB Female Characters
2014	TVB Anniversary Awards	Nominated	Best Actress
2014	TVB Star Awards Malaysia	Won	Top 15 Favorite TVB Drama Characters
2014	19th Asian Television Awards	Won - Highly Commended	Best Comedy Performance by an Actor/Actress
2015	TVB Star Awards Malaysia	Won	Top 16 Favourite TVB Drama Characters
2015	TVB Star Awards Malaysia	Nominated	Favourite TVB Actress
2015	StarHub TVB Awards	Won	My Favourite TVB Female Characters
2015	StarHub TVB Awards	Nominated	My Favourite TVB Actress
2015	TVB Anniversary Awards	Nominated	Best Actress
2015	TVB Anniversary Awards	Nominated	Most Popular Female Character
2016	StarHub TVB Awards	Won	My Favourite TVB Female Characters
2016	StarHub TVB Awards	Nominated	My Favourite TVB Supporting Actress
2016	StarHub TVB Awards	Nominated	Tokyo Bust Express The Sassy Award
2016	TVB Anniversary Awards	Nominated	Best Actress
2017	European Cinematography Awards	Won	Best Actress
2017	Los Angeles Film Awards	Won	Best Actress
2017	TVB Star Awards Malaysia	Top 5	Favourite TVB Host (with Myolie Wu, Nancy Wu, Mandy Wong, Elaine Yiu and Paisley Wu)
2017	TVB Anniversary Awards	Nominated	Most Popular Onscreen Partnership (with Myolie Wu, Nancy Wu, Mandy Wong, Elaine Yiu and Paisley Wu)
2017	People's Choice Television Awards	Ranked 2nd	People's Choice Best Variety Show Host (with Myolie Wu, Nancy Wu, Mandy Wong, Elaine Yiu and Paisley Wu)
2018	TVB Anniversary Awards	Nominated	Best Actress
2018	TVB Anniversary Awards	Nominated	Most Popular Female Character
2018	TVB Anniversary Awards	Nominated	Most Favourite Best Actress in Malaysia
2018	People's Choice Television Awards	Ranked 5th	People's Choice Best Actress
2019	7th Canadian Screen Awards	Top 5	Best Supporting Actress, Drama Series
2019	TVB Anniversary Awards	Top 5	Best Actress
2019	TVB Anniversary Awards	Won	Most Popular Female Character
2019	TVB Anniversary Awards	Won	Most Popular On-screen Partnership (with Joel Chan)
2019	People's Choice Television Awards	Won	People's Choice Best Actress
2019	Elite Awards	Won	Superior Popular Award
2020	JOOX x TOP MUSIC AWARDS 2020	Won	Awarded 2nd season singles at the 6th place
2020	2020 JSG Best Singles First Season Award	Won	Awarded best singles at the 9th place
2020	TVB Anniversary Awards	Nominated	Best Actress
2020	TVB Anniversary Awards	Nominated	Most Popular Female Character
2020	Asian Television Awards	Top 5	Best Actress
2020	People's Choice Television Awards	Nominated	People's Choice Best Actress, Best Acting Scene
2021	New York Festivals TV and Film Awards	Won	Best Actress - Credit Award
2022	7th VIP Music Chart Hits Award Ceremony	Won	VIP Best Performing Award - Gold
2022	7th VIP Music Chart Hits Award Ceremony	Won	VIP Most Popular Creative Song Award
2022	Asian Television Awards	Top 8	Best Actress
2022	TVB Anniversary Awards	Top 5	Best Actress
2022	TVB Anniversary Awards	Nominated	Most Popular Female Character
2022	TVB Anniversary Awards	Top 5	Favourite TVB Actress in Malaysia
2022	TVB Anniversary Awards	Nominated	Most Popular On-screen Partnership (with Joel Chan)
2022	TVB Anniversary Awards	Nominated	Most Popular TV Soundtrack
2022	People's Choice Television Awards	Nominated	People's Choice Best Actress/ Best On-Screen Partnership/ Best Theme Song
2023	TVB Anniversary Awards	Top 5	Best Actress
2023	TVB Anniversary Awards	Top 5	Favourite TVB Actress in Greater Bay Area
2023	TVB Anniversary Awards	Nominated	Favourite TVB Actress in Malaysia
2023	People's Choice Television Awards	Nominated	People's Choice Best Actress/ Best On-Screen Partnership
2023	Youku Entertainment× the Queen of News Closing Ceremony	Won	Most Representative Queen's Award

Awards and achievements
Miss Hong Kong
Preceded by Cerina da Graça 嘉碧儀	Miss Photogenic, Miss Talent; 2003	Succeeded by Kate Tsui 徐子珊
