= Dickson Yu =

Hong Kong actor and television presenter

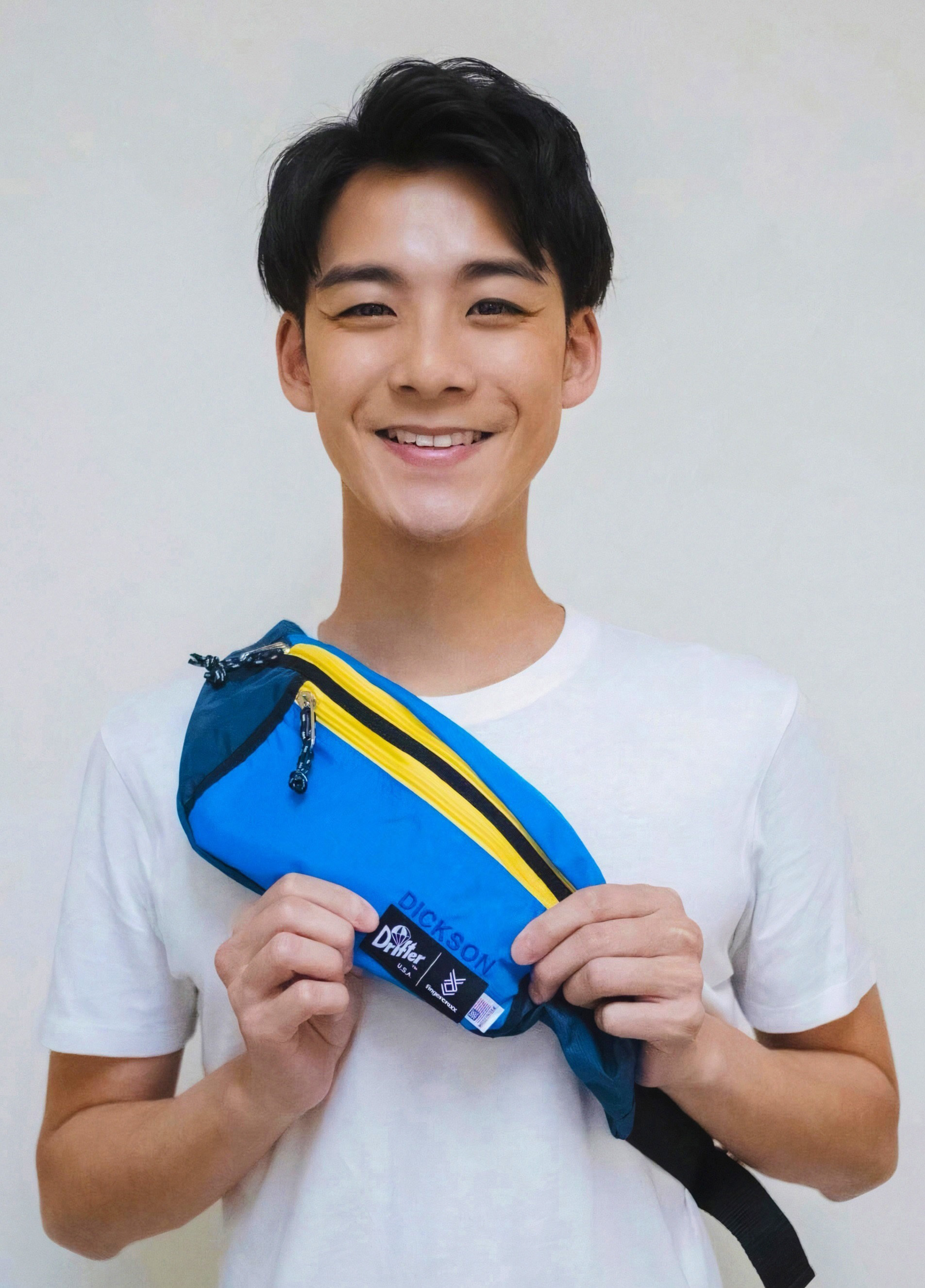
- Yu in 2013
- Born: Yu Tak-shing; 2 September 1989 (age 36); Canada
- Occupations: Actor, television presenter, radio DJ, model
- Years active: 2011–present

Dickson Yu Tak-shing (Chinese: 余德丞; born 2 September 1989) is a Hong Kong actor, television presenter, radio DJ and model . In 2016, Yu debuted as an actor, and scored his first major role in 2017, as "Ocean" in TVB's My Ages Apart.

== Biography ==
Yu attended the Pun U Association Wah Yan Primary School and the prestigious secondary school, Wah Yan College. Yu was a competitive swimmer, and was a member of Hong Kong's national swimming team. Despite being a frequent competitor in athletic meets, Yu failed to qualify for the Asian Games. This led to his decision to forgo his swimming career.

In 2011, Yu graduated with a degree in business administration from the City University of Hong Kong. He worked for a brand company, but quit the job to become a radio DJ and writer for Metro Broadcast. In 2013, Ricky Fan introduced him to TVB.

Yu's first gig with TVB was being a presenter for TVB Sports News. In 2015, Yu was offered a spot to host the children's program series Kids, Think Big. In 2016, he crossed over to TVB's drama department, and was trained by Anthony Wong. He earned minor speak roles in Blue Veins (2016) and Two Steps from Heaven (2016). Yu rose to popularity after portraying "Ocean" in the 2017 television drama My Ages Apart.

On 8 August 2018, Yu passed out during a football match in Sai Ying Pun. He was brought to Queen Mary Hospital and was in intensive care. On 11 August 2018, Yu finally regained consciousness and was understood that a defibrillator was used to save his life.

In May 2022, Dickson announced his departure from TVB, ending an 8 year work-contract.

== Filmography ==
=== Television series ===
Year	Title	Chinese title	Network	Role	Notes
2016	Blue Veins	殭	TVB	Job Seeker	Episode 10
2016	Two Steps from Heaven	幕後玩家	TVB	Entertainment news reporter	Episodes 1, 21, 31
2017–18	My Ages Apart	誇世代	TVB	Ocean Sheung Ho-yeung	Supporting role
2019	The Ghetto-Fabulous Lady	福爾摩師奶	TVB	Yau Ci	
2019	The Defected	鐵探	TVB	Mok Sai-chiu	
2022	Freedom Memories	青春不要臉	TVB	Lau Dak Wing	Main role

=== Television shows ===
Year	Title	Chinese title	Network	Notes
2022	International Markets for Sisters	姊妹們的國際市場	ViuTV	Host, dating show
2023	Beautiful Bitchy Bros	粉紅麻甩101	ViuTV	LGBT related show

=== Radio presenter ===
Year	Title	Chinese Title	Network	Notes
2022 - Present	When I Was Young I Listen To The Radio	口水多過浪花	Commercial Radio Hong Kong	

==== TV presenter ====
Year	Title	Chinese title	Network	Role	Notes
2013–present	TVB Sports News	TVB體育台	TVB	News reporter	
2014	World Cup Girls	低俗講波團	TVB	Commentator	Web series
2014	Gorilla Study Group	猩猩補習班	TVB	Co-host	Episodes 21–28
2014–17	Kids, Think Big	Think Big 天地	TVB	Co-host	
2015–16	Y Angle	Y Angle	TVB	Co-host	
2015–present	Sports World	體育世界	TVB	Co-host	
2015	2015 World Aquatics Championships	FINA世界游泳錦標賽2015	TVB	Commentator	Hong Kong broadcast
2016	TVB's 2016 Summer Olympics	里約奧運2016	TVB	Co-host	Hong Kong broadcast
2017	TVB's FA Community Shield 2017	2017英格蘭社區盾	TVB	Co-host	Hong Kong broadcast
2017	Young and Restless in Taiwan	#後生仔去台灣傾吓偈	TVB	Co-host	
