= Joel Chan =

Hong Kong actor and singer

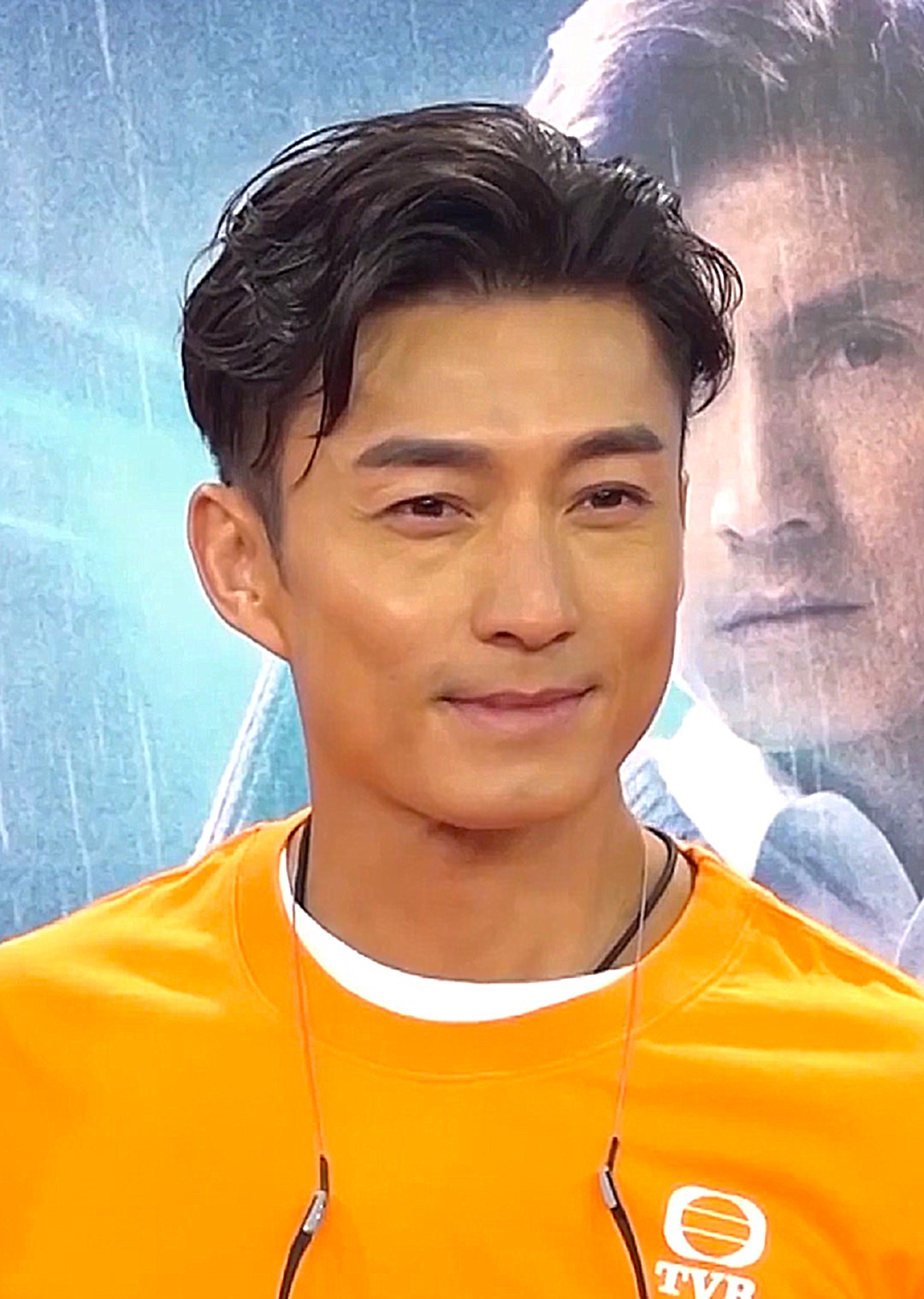
- Chan in 2019
- Born: Chan Shan-tsung (陳山蔥); Portuguese Macau
- Occupations: Actor; singer
- Years active: 1994–present
- Notable work: The Unholy Alliance; Barrack O'Karma series
- Awards: TVB Star Awards Malaysia – Favourite TVB Supporting Actor; 2017 The Unholy Alliance TVB Anniversary Awards – Best Supporting Actor; 2017 The Unholy Alliance; Most Popular Onscreen Partnership; 2019 Barrack O'Karma (shared with Selena Lee); Best Actor; 2022 Barrack O'Karma 1968

Chinese name
- Traditional Chinese: 陳山聰
Transcriptions
Standard Mandarin
- Hanyu Pinyin: Chén Shāncōng
Yue: Cantonese
- Jyutping: Can4 Saan1 Chung

Joel Chan Shan-chung is a Hong Kong actor and singer contracted to TVB and Shaw Brothers Pictures. He made his debut in 1995 as a solo Cantopop singer, later transitioning into acting.

Chan won the Best Supporting Actor award at the 2017 TVB Anniversary Awards with his role as Kent in the action drama The Unholy Alliance.

In 2019, Chan played his first male leading role in the critical acclaimed supernatural drama Barrack O'Karma. With his dual role as Siu Wai-ming and Lau Yuk-fai, Chan earned his first nominations for Best Actor and Most Popular Male Character at the 2019 TVB Anniversary Awards, eventually being placed among top 5 for both categories.

In 2022, Chan won the Best Actor award with his role in supernatural drama Barrack O'Karma 1968.

== Personal life ==
In 2011, Joel Chan and Florinda Ho, the third daughter of "Gambling King" Stanley Ho, were repeatedly rumored to be in a relationship but the two denied the news. Joel Chan also admitted that he had gone through divorce procedures with his ex-wife Ponny Yeung with whom he had been in a relationship for 10 years at the end of 2010. In the early morning of August 14, 2011, Florinda Ho, the daughter of the rich businessman Stanley Ho, uploaded a photo on Weibo, officially publicizing the relationship. In 2013, he and Florinda ended their two-year relationship.

On November 1, 2019, Chan married his out of industry girlfriend, Apple Ho, after dating for 5 years. The two held a wedding banquet at the W Hotel in Hong Kong. On 14 February 2020, he announced on Instagram that his wife was pregnant. On July 1 of the same year, his wife gave birth to their 7.1-pound son, Jaco Chan, by caesarean section.

Due to their common interest in long-distance running, Chan along with Benjamin Yuen, Brian Tse, Jack Wu, Nancy Wu, Paisley Wu, Elaine Yiu, Selena Lee and Mandy Wong formed the group Crazy Runner.

== Filmography ==
=== Television dramas (TVB) ===
Year	Title	Role	Notes
1995	Forty Something	Yeung Chung-choi	
2001	Virtues of Harmony	Wong Moon-hing	Sitcom (6 episodes)
2002	A Herbalist Affair	Lau Chi-wai	
2003	Virtues of Harmony II	Alex Fong Kai-chung	Sitcom
2003	Survivor's Law	Eric Tsang Kin-keung	
2004	The Vigilante in the Mask	Yuk Yip	
2004	Twin of Brothers	Yu-man Chi-kap	
2005	Just Love	Brian Pak Lai-yan	
2005	The Gateau Affairs	Chu Yau-leung	
2005	Misleading Track	Lui Kwok-tung	
2005	Healing Hands III	Officer Wong	
2005	Women on the Run	Shan	
2005	Revolving Doors of Vengeance	Hung Wan-loi	
2005	Life Made Simple	Cheung Dai-wai	
2005	Always Ready	Albert Siu Chi-ming	
2005	The Herbalist's Manual	Fung Sau	
2006	Greed Mask	Danny	
2006	Forensic Heroes	"Man" Choi Wai-man	
2006	Maiden's Vow	Henry Pat Ha-kau	
2006	Glittering Days	Law Wai	
2007	Heavenly In-Laws	Tsor-chi / Cheng Sau-yip	Warehoused; released on DVD January 2007
2007	A Change of Destiny	Siu Kok-wah	
2007	The Green Grass of Home	Jason Yung Chor-yiu	
2007	Marriage of Inconvenience	Ho Nam	
2007–08	Survivor's Law II	Pat Ching-yee	
2008	The Seventh Day	Martin Ma Tin-fuk	
2008	The Four	Ling Siu-kwat	
2009	EU	Tsor-lun / Fai Wing-lun	
2009	Just Love II	Brian Bak Lai-yan	
2009	Man in Charge	Kin-lung Emperor	
2009	Sweetness in the Salt	Choi Chi-on	
2009	You're Hired	Tung Yat-boon	
2010	Don Juan DeMercado	Cheung Jai-chun	
2010	OL Supreme	Lui Yu	Sitcom regular
2010	In the Eye of the Beholder	Lee Tsan-hing	
2010	Sisters of Pearl	Chow Yuk-tsai	Major Supporting Role
2010	The Mysteries of Love	Louis	Episode 18
2010	A Pillow Case of Mystery II	So Ying-chun / Prince Guuwalgiya Jinchun	Major Supporting Role
2011	Dropping by Cloud Nine	Ivan	Episode 6: "Our Romantic Story"
2011	Only You	Ashley On	Guest Star in Episodes 12–13: "I Have a Dream"
2011	Face to Fate	Yip Chor-sam	Previously warehoused; released on DVD August 2006
2011	Relic of an Emissary	Chu Wan-man, the Kin-man Emperor	Major Supporting Role
2011	Curse of the Royal Harem	Min-yan, the Prince Sui	Major Supporting Role
2011–12	Bottled Passion	Ko Yee-tai	Major Supporting Role
2012	The Last Steep Ascent	Lai Chai-man	Supporting Role
2014–15	Noblesse Oblige	To Chun-ming	Major Supporting Role
2015	Captain of Destiny	Wong Yat-hin	Major Supporting Role
2015	With or Without You		Supporting Role
2015	Angel In-the-Making	Arthur Tong	Major Supporting Role
2015–16	The Executioner	Sze Ma-cau	Major Supporting Role
2016	Fashion War	Martin Ma Shing-ho	Major Supporting Role
2016	Blue Veins	Ling Fung	Major Supporting Role
2016	My Dangerous Mafia Retirement Plan	Ko Kai	Major Supporting Role
2016	Presumed Accidents	Hong Kiu	Guest Appearance
2017	May Fortune Smile On You	Choi Sun	Major Supporting Role
2017	Burning Hands	Hugo Ng Pak-yi	Major Supporting Role
2017	The Unholy Alliance	Kent Ling Tsin-yau	Major Supporting Role TVB Anniversary Award for Best Supporting Actor; TVB Star Award Malaysia for Favourite Supporting Actor; StarHub TVB Award for My Favourite TVB Male TV Characters
2018	Daddy Cool	Ka Cheuk / Ben Ka Cheuk-ban	Major Supporting Role
2018	Succession War	Fuca Fuchang'an	Major Supporting Role
2019	Flying Tiger 2	Ho Chun	Major Supporting Role
2019	Barrack O'Karma	Siu Wai-ming / Lau Yuk-fai	1st Male Lead TVB Anniversary Award for Most Popular Onscreen Partnership (shared with Selena Lee)
2020	Brutally Young	Sum King-yat	2nd Male Lead
2021	The Runner	Yuen Lik	1st Male Lead
2021	Battle of the Seven Sisters	Duncan Yip Tsz-lai	Guest Appearance
2022	The Righteous Fists	Tony Lin Kik / Lin Chun-shan	Major Supporting Role
2022	Barrack O'Karma 1968	Maurice / Joey Chow Yi / Psychiatric patient / Architect	1st Male Lead TVB Anniversary Award for Best Actor
2022	Brutally Young 2.0	Jason Fong Chi-ho	Major Supporting Role
2022	My Pride	Yip Kwok-tung	1st Male Lead
2022	The Beauty of War	Kevin Wong Yat-yin	1st Male Lead
2022	I’ve Got The Power	Ko Yong	Major Supporting Role
2023	The Invisibles	Koo Ka-keung (Cool Sir)	2nd Male Lead
TBA	Anonymous Signal	Kwok Pak-fei	1st Male Lead
TBA	The QUEEN of News		Guest Appearance

=== Television dramas (Shaw Brothers Pictures) ===
Year	Title	Role	Notes
2018	Flying Tiger	Wong Wing-yin	Guest Appearance
2019	Flying Tiger II	Ho Chun / Cheuk Tin-loi	Main Role

=== Film ===
- 1999: The Social Worker from the Edge
- 2000: God's Family Hymnal
- 2003: Dream and Desire
- 2003: Mark Six Comedy
- 2004: Cop Unbowed
- 2004: A-1 Headline
- 2004: The Beautiful Life
- 2005: Futago
- 2010: 72 Tenants of Prosperity
- 2014: Grey Met Shrek
- 2019: Line Walker 2
- TBA: Endless Battle

== Discography ==
- 1994: A B C D
- 1996: 愛是全意 (Love is My Focus)

== Other works ==
Musicals

- 1996: Snow White as the Prince

Music video appearances

- "一不小心" (Once Not Careful) by Nicola Cheung

Soundtracks

- "天數" (Counting Destiny), theme song for A Change of Destiny
  - Duet with Steven Ma
