= Celine Ma =

Hong Kong actress and singer (born 1967)

- Born: Leung Wing-ngan (梁穎顏); 6 December 1967 (age 58); Hong Kong
- Occupations: Actress; singer
- Years active: 1989–present

Chinese name
- Traditional Chinese: 馬蹄露
- Simplified Chinese: 马蹄露
Transcriptions
Standard Mandarin
- Hanyu Pinyin: Mǎtí lù
Yue: Cantonese
- Jyutping: Maa^{5} Tai^{4} Lou^{6}

Leung Wing-ngan (Chinese: 梁穎顏) (born 6 December 1967), better known by her stage name Celine Ma Tai-lo (Chinese: 馬蹄露), is a Hong Kong actress and singer. She is best known for her role as May May in the long-running TVB television series A Kindred Spirit.

== Career ==
Celine Ma participated in the New Talent Singing Awards organised by TVB and Capital Artists. She also worked as a DJ at Commercial Radio Hong Kong, where she was in charge of the traffic bulletin, thus obtaining her stage name Ma Tai Lo (馬蹄露).

After entering TVB, she made her debut in A Kindred Spirit as May May, her most well known role. The episode where her character attempted suicide was the highest rated episode during the series' four-year run from 1995-1999. Celine was awarded Most Hated Television Character for her role in the 1997 TVB Anniversary Awards.

Celine Ma has remained an active supporting actress on TVB. She has either played supporting roles or made guest appearances in numerous TVB dramas. Celine has also acted in several Hong Kong films.

== Political attitudes ==
Ma had openly voiced her support for the Hong Kong Police during the 2014 Hong Kong protests. She had participated in pro-China counter protests since then and later in the 2019–2020 Hong Kong protests.

On 5 July 2019, Ma mocked the five demands of pro-democracy protesters as "rubbish" on social media. On 6 October 2019, Ma was involved in a physical altercation with a group of demonstrators, resulting in injuries requiring stitches on her chin and the back of her head. After being interviewed by an Australian reporter, she requested the reporter to escort her to the police for treatment, refusing first aid from protesters and volunteers, saying she "doesn't trust [them] anymore."

== Filmography ==
=== Television series ===
Year	Title	Role	Remark
1995–1999	A Kindred Spirit	May May	Won - Most Hated Television Character
1997	Demi-Gods and Semi-Devils		
1997	A Recipe for the Heart	Bo Choi Lin	
1997	Detective Investigation Files III	Helen	Episodes 37 - 40
1998	Dark Tales II	Toad Spirit	Part VI (Episodes 26–30)
1998	The Duke of Mount Deer 1998	Mo Tung Chu	
1999	Untraceable Evidence II	Wu Pui Man	Episodes 16-17
1999	Feminine Masculinity	May May Chan	
1999	Detective Investigation Files IV	Man On Yee	Episodes 1-3
1999	A Loving Spirit		
1999	Anti-Crime Squad	Dan Gai Yee	
1999	At the Threshold of an Era	Hui Men Ying	
2000	Witness to a Prosecution	Sung Ling	
2000	The Legendary Four Aces	Ha Yeurng	
2001	Reaching Out		
2001	A Taste of Love	Ma Lai Na	
2001	In the Realm of Success	Chan Siu Mei	
2001	Virtues of Harmony	Bak Hup	
2001	Armed Reaction III	Rita	
2001	The Stamp of Love	Lo Choi Hung	
2002	Take My Word For It	Pang Kwok Fu's wife	
2004	Armed Reaction IV	Rita	
2005	Lost in the Chamber of Love	Ho Yuk Lin	
2005	The Gâteau Affairs	Mu Si	
2005	Fantasy Hotel	Cheung Suk Han	
2005	The Zone		
2005	Wars of In-laws	So Gu	
2005	Hidden Treasures	Cheung Pak Chi	
2006	The Bitter Bitten	Grace Wong Yin	
2006	Maidens' Vow	Wun Yuen Yao	
2006	Placebo Cure	Lee Yeun Chi	Episode 13
2007	A Change of Destiny	Lee Lai Ping	
2007	Phoenix Rising	Hon Wan	
2007	Word Twisters' Adventures		
2007	Ten Brothers	matchmaker	Episode 1
2008	Catch Me Now	Luk Ding Hung	
2008	The Money-Maker Recipe	Fan Tai	
2008	Speech of Silence	Gung Wai Kiu	
2008	When a Dog Loves a Cat	Sally	
2008	The Gem of Life	Candy	
2008–2010	Off Pedder	Lee Yee Kam	Sitcom regular
2009	Sweetness in the Salt	Wu Choi Dip	
2009	The Beauty of the Game	Ha Bing (Ice)	
2010	Don Juan DeMercado		
2010	My Better Half	Doctor	Episode 17
2010	Fly With Me		
2010-2011	Show Me the Happy		
2011	Be Home for Dinner		
2011	Forensic Heroes III	Chan Man Kuen	Episodes 28-30
2012–2015	Come Home Love	So Bik	Sitcom regular
2012	No Good Either Way	Frances Gan	
2012	Ghetto Justice II	Beauty	
2013	The Day of Days	Sum Kai Yiu	
2013	Awfully Lawful	Fanny	
2013	Brother's Keeper		
2014	The Ultimate Addiction	Chu Kiu Chim	
2014–2015	Noblesse Oblige	Ho Sau-yee	
2015	Eye in the Sky	Chu Lau-si	
2015	Ghost of Relativity	Ma May-zing	
2015	The Fixer	Chu Lee-yin	Episodes 8-16
2016	Speed of Life	Susan	
2016	Presumed Accidents	Helen	

=== Film ===
Year	Title	Role	Remark
1993	Chez n' Ham	Teacher	Also known as Curry and Pepper 3
1993	Murder	Secretary	
1998	Tricky King	Zilla	
1998	Mr. Wai-Go		
1998	How to Get Rich by Feng Shui		
1998	Take Five	Principal	
1998	Step Into the Dark	May May	
2010	72 Tenants of Prosperity	"Hoi Phone Fu" employee	
2011	I Love Hong Kong	Lin	
2012	I Love Hong Kong 2012	Rosemary	
2013	I Love Hong Kong 2013	Lin	
2013	Blind Detective	Casino gambler	
