= Gloria Tang Pui-yee =

Hong Kong Canadian actress

- 鄧佩儀
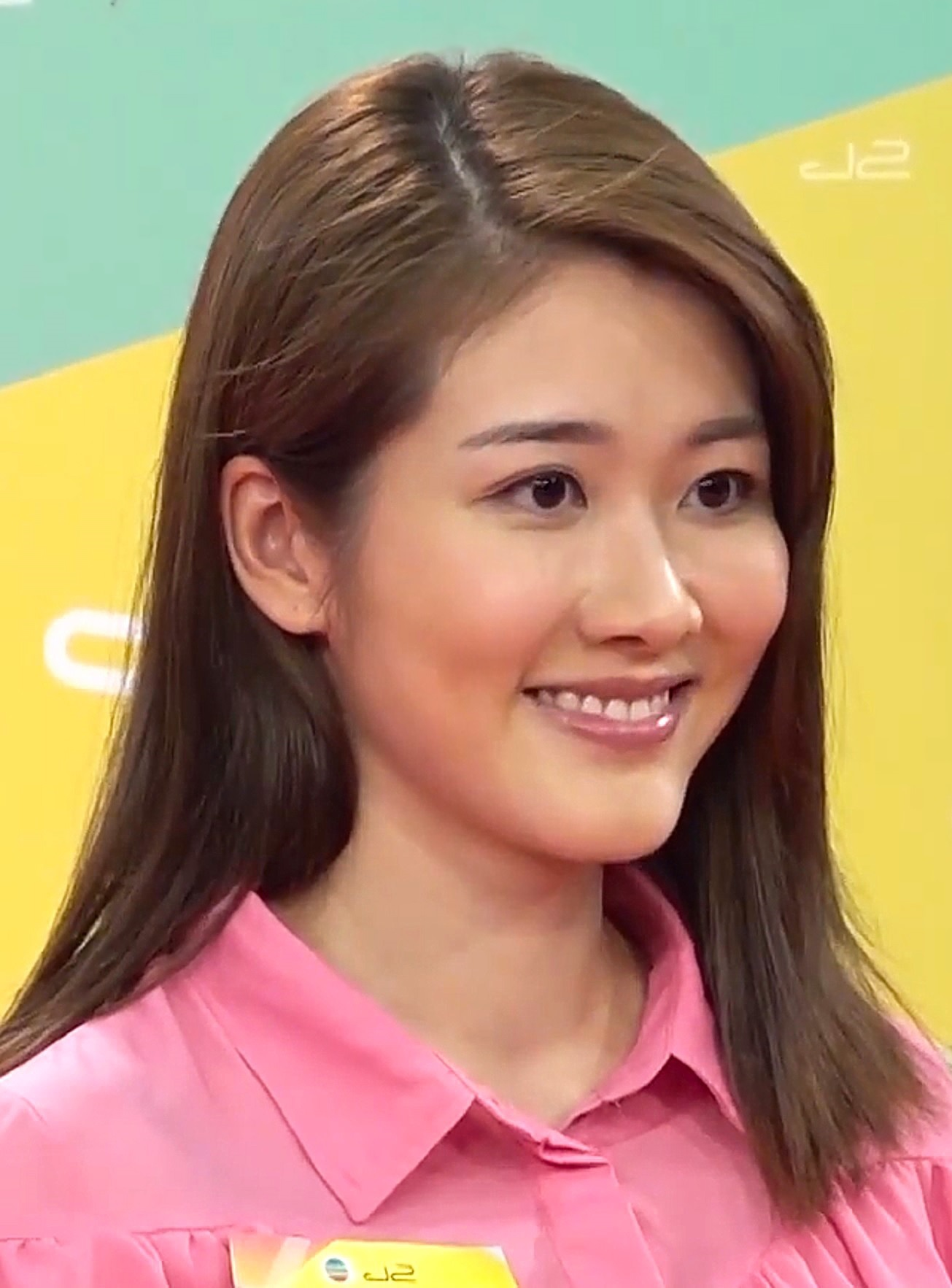
- Tang in 2019
- Born: 10 November 1992 (age 32); British Hong Kong
- Citizenship: Canada
- Occupation(s): Actress, television host
- Years active: 2013–present
- Title: Miss Chinese Vancouver 2012; Miss Chinese International 2013

Chinese name
- Traditional Chinese: 鄧佩儀
- Simplified Chinese: 邓佩仪
Transcriptions
Standard Mandarin
- Hanyu Pinyin: Dèng Pèiyí
Yue: Cantonese
- Jyutping: Dang6 Pui3 Ji4

Gloria Tang Pui-yee (Chinese: 鄧佩儀; born 10 November 1992) is a Hong Kong Canadian actress and beauty pageant titleholder. She is the winner of Miss Chinese (Vancouver) Pageant 2012 and Miss Chinese International Pageant 2013.

== Early ==
Gloria Tang, born in Hong Kong, moved to Richmond, British Columbia with her parents in 2000 and pursued a specialization in Marketing at the University of British Columbia's Sauder School of Business and specialised in Marketing in the Business.

== Career ==
=== Pageant career ===
At the age of 19, Tang competed in and won Miss Chinese Vancouver 2012. She went on to represent Vancouver at Miss Chinese International 2013 held at TVB City, Hong Kong. She won the title, becoming the sixth representative from Vancouver to win the Miss Chinese International title.

=== Acting career ===
Tang joined Hong Kong broadcaster TVB after crowning her Miss Chinese International successor. She made her acting debut in the 2014 drama The Ultimate Addiction, playing 'Ginnie Cheuk'.

Tang continued to play supporting roles in the next few years. In 2016, she played 'Maple Chin' in the drama Two Steps From Heaven,. Tang played the undercover agent 'Kay Kwong' in the 2019 crime drama The Defected, and was nominated for the Best Supporting Actress at the 2019 TVB Anniversary Awards, placing among the top 5.

In 2020, Tang had notable performance in the dramas Airport Strikers as the Airport Security Unit member 'Silver Ho' and The Exorcist's 2nd Meter as the rich exorcist 'Liz Sze'. With her performance in 2020, Tang was placed among the top 5 nominees for the Most Improved Female Artiste at the 2020 TVB Anniversary Awards.

In July 2020, Tang was cast in her first female leading role for the time-travelling drama Take Two. The drama was broadcast in October 2021. With her role as 'Hailey Cheung', Tang gained her first Best Actress nomination at the 2021 TVB Anniversary Awards.

== Filmography ==
=== Television dramas (TVB) ===
Year	Title	Role	Notes
2014	The Ultimate Addiction	Ginnie Cheuk Chi-yin	Major Supporting Role
2015	Young Charioteers	Tiffany Tam Sin-nga	Supporting Role
2015	With or Without You	Mok Yum	Ep. 7
2016	Speed of Life	Choi Soo-hye / Chiu Wing-hor	Ep. 10-12
2016	Short End of the Stick	Mung Lui	Supporting Role
2016	Law dis-Order	Shirley Tam Suet-yee	Ep. 11-14
2016	Two Steps from Heaven	Maple Chin Ka-yan	Major Supporting Role
2017	My Unfair Lady	Miki Lee Mei-kei	Supporting Role
2017	A General, a Scholar and a Eunuch	Chu Ka-yiu	Supporting Role
2018	The Taxorcist Sidequel	Lo Tai	Web miniseries
2018	Another Era	Chu Siu-wai	Major Supporting Role
2019	The Defected	Kay Kwong Wing-sa	Major Supporting Role
2019	Barrack O'Karma	Wan Ching	Ep. 5–6, 20
2020	Airport Strikers	Silver Ho Sze-wah	Major Supporting Role
2020	The Exorcist's 2nd Meter	Liz Sze Loi-sze	Major Supporting Role
2020	Legal Mavericks 2020	Joanne Ting Ning	Ep. 20-22
2021	Armed Reaction 2021	Nicki Hui Chin-ying	Major Supporting Role
2021	Take Two	Hailey Cheung Man	Main Role

== Awards and nominations ==
Year	Award	Result
2012	Miss Chinese Vancouver Pageant & Best Posture	Won
2013	Miss Chinese International Pageant	Won
2017	TVB Star Awards Malaysia for Favourite TVB Most Improved Female Artiste	Nominated
2018	TVB Anniversary Award for Most Improved Female Artiste	Nominated
2018	TVB Anniversary Award for Best Supporting Actress	Nominated
2018	TVB Anniversary Award for Most Popular Female Character	Nominated
2018	TVB Anniversary Award for Favourite TVB Actress in Malaysia	Nominated
2018	TVB Anniversary Award for Favourite TVB Actress in Singapore	Nominated
2018	TVB Anniversary Award for Most Popular Onscreen Partnership (shared with Benjamin Yuen and Pakho Chau)	Nominated
2019	TVB Anniversary Award for Most Improved Female Artiste	Nominated
2019	TVB Anniversary Award for Best Supporting Actress	Nominated (Top 5)
2020	TVB Anniversary Award for Most Improved Female Artiste	Nominated (Top 5)
2020	TVB Anniversary Award for Best Supporting Actress	Nominated
2020	TVB Anniversary Award for Most Popular Female Character	Nominated
2021	TVB Anniversary Award for Most Improved Female Artiste	Nominated
2021	TVB Anniversary Award for Best Actress	Nominated (Top 10)
2021	TVB Anniversary Award for Best Supporting Actress	Nominated
2021	TVB Anniversary Award for Most Popular Female Character	Nominated
2021	TVB Anniversary Award for Favourite TVB Actress in Malaysia	Nominated
2021	TVB Anniversary Award for Most Popular Onscreen Partnership (shared with Him Law, Tony Hung and Leo Kwan)	Nominated
