= Benjamin Yuen =

Hong Kong actor and singer

- 袁偉豪
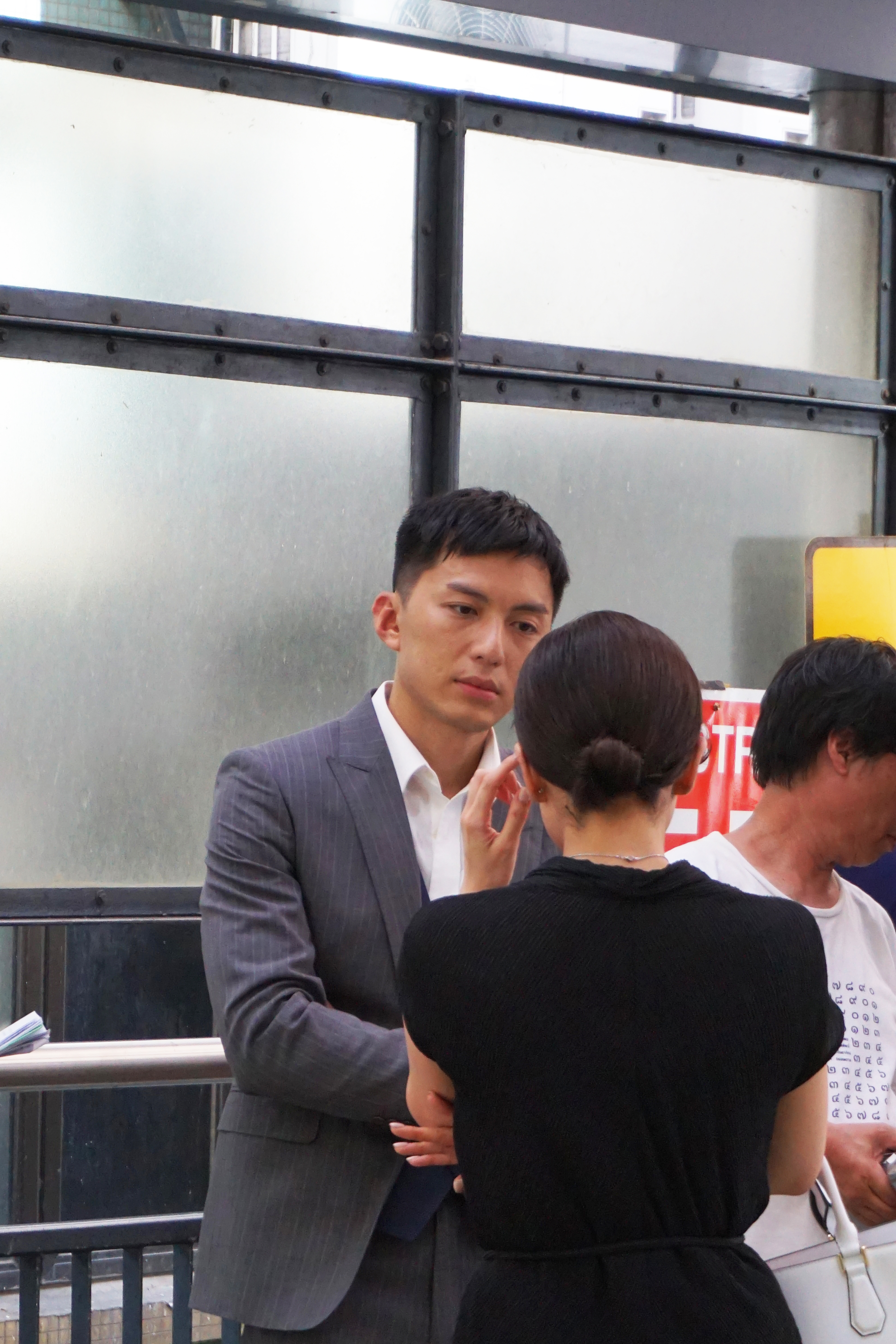
- Yuen in 2016
- Born: Yuen Wai-ho; 11 May 1981 (age 45); British Hong Kong
- Education: York English Primary School and Kindergarten (York Road, Kowloon Tong); New Method College
- Occupations: Actor; singer
- Years active: 1998–present
- Notable work: A Fist Within Four Walls; Threesome; The Defected
- Spouse: Bowie Cheung Po-yee (m. 2020)
- Partner: Jennifer Shum Hang-yin (sep. 2016)
- Awards: 2007 Mr. Hong Kong – Champion TVB Anniversary Awards – Most Popular Male Character; 2016 A Fist Within Four Walls; Favourite TVB Actor in Malaysia; 2018 Stealing Seconds; Favourite TVB Actor in Singapore; 2018 Stealing Seconds TVB Star Awards Malaysia – Most Promising TVB Male Artiste; 2013 The Hippocratic Crush II; Favourite TVB Supporting Actor; 2015 The Fixer

Chinese name
- Traditional Chinese: 袁偉豪
- Simplified Chinese: 袁伟豪
Transcriptions
Standard Mandarin
- Hanyu Pinyin: Yuán Wěi Háo
Yue: Cantonese
- Jyutping: jyun^{4} wai^{5}hou^{4}
- Website: Official TVB profile

Benjamin Yuen Wai-ho (simplified Chinese: 袁伟豪; traditional Chinese: 袁偉豪, born May 11, 1981) is a Hong Kong actor and singer contracted to TVB and Shaw Brothers Pictures.

Yuen's career started when he became the winner of Hong Kong's Mr. Hong Kong beauty contest in 2007. Yuen was the first winner from Hong Kong as the previous two winners, Matthew Ko and Francois Huynh came from Canada and France respectively.

In 2016, Yuen won Most Popular Male Character award at the TVB Anniversary Awards with his role in the critical acclaimed martial drama A Fist Within Four Walls. In 2018, he won the Favourite Actor awards in both Malaysia and Singapore with his role in Stealing Seconds.

== Acting career ==
In 2016, Yuen gained recognition in the critical acclaimed martial arts action drama A Fist Within Four Walls, winning the Most Popular Male Character award at the 2016 TVB Anniversary Awards and was placed among the top 5 nominees for the Best Actor. In 2018, Yuen starred in the drama Stealing Seconds as the first male lead, for which he won the Favourite TVB Actor awards in both Malaysia and Singapore at the 2018 TVB 51st Anniversary Gala. With his role in the drama Another Era, Yuen was placed among top 5 for the Best Actor at the 2018 TVB Anniversary Awards.

In 2019, Yuen starred in the crime drama The Defected as the first male lead, starring opposite veterans Kara Wai and Philip Keung. Again, he was placed among the top 5 nominees for the Best Actor at the 2019 TVB Anniversary Awards. In 2020, Yuen released his first song (你與你的另一半). He composed the song while Bowie Cheung filled the lyrics. At the 2020 TVB Anniversary Awards, Yuen along with Pakho Chau won the Best Host award with The PakhoBen Outdoor Show. In 2022, he was one of the 12 contestants to participate in the second season of TVB's variety show: Dub of War.

== Personal life ==
Yuen and Cheung, who had been dating for three years, held an intimate ceremony in their swanky new apartment on 24 November 2020, with only close friends and family in attendance.

Due to their common interest in long-distance running, Yuen along with Joel Chan, Brian Tse, Jack Wu Lok-yin, Nancy Wu, Paisley Wu, Elaine Yiu Tsz-ling, Selena Lee and Mandy Wong Chi-man formed the group Crazy Runner.

The 42-year-old disclosed on social media late on November 20, 2023, that his wife gave birth to their first child on Nov 17. 3

== Filmography ==
=== Television dramas (TVB) ===
Year	English title	Role	Notes
2008	Forensic Heroes II	Eric Kat Ka-ho 吉家浩	Cameo
2008	Your Class or Mine	Lin Cheung-shing 連長勝	Supporting Role
2009	The King of Snooker	Jimmy	Supporting Role
2009	D.I.E. Again	Tong Kai-fat 唐啟發	Ep. 12–13
2010	The Season of Fate	Abraham	Cameo
2010	Cupid Stupid	Kelvin	Supporting Role
2010	Don Juan De Mercado	Contestant	Cameo
2010	My Better Half	Model	Ep. 16
2010	Suspects in Love	Chow Wai-tong 周偉棠	Supporting Role
2010	Sisters of Pearl	Pang Chun-choi 彭駿才	Cameo
2010	Every Move You Make	Ethan Lo Man-kin 盧文健	Ep. 1–2
2011	The Rippling Blossom	Nin Kei-sai 年紀細	Supporting Role
2011	Relic of an Emissary	Lee King-lung 李景隆	Supporting Role
2011	Yes, Sir. Sorry, Sir!	Kwan Sir 關Sir	Cameo
2011	My Sister of Eternal Flower	Chan Bo-lai 陳步禮	Cameo
2011	Wax and Wane	Vincent	Cameo
2011	The Other Truth	David	Ep. 3
2011	The Life and Times of a Sentinel	Muk Fung 穆峰	Supporting Role
2011	River of Wine	Boss Tsui 徐老闆	Ep. 3, 10
2011	Super Snoops	Tong Sap-sam 唐十三	Cameo
2011–2012	Til Love Do Us Lie	Alvin Ko Ching-wan 高青雲	Major Supporting Role
2012	The Hippocratic Crush	Dr. "Ben" Benjamin Lau Bing-chan 劉炳燦	Major Supporting Role
2012	Gloves Come Off	Lai Ying 黎英	Supporting Role
2012	Tiger Cubs	ASGT Tse Ka-Sing 謝家星	Major Supporting Role
2012	The Last Steep Ascent	Ho Sai-leung 賀世亮	Supporting Role
2012	Highs and Lows	Tse Ka-sing 謝家星	Guest Appearance (Ep. 30)
2013	A Change of Heart	Martin Ting Chun-ping 丁俊平	Major Supporting Role TVB Star Award Malaysia for Most Promising TVB Male Artiste
2013	Karma Rider	Young Lok Mo-ngai 年青樂無涯	Cameo
2013	Always and Ever	Chin Chiu / Chin Chiu-yan 展昭 / 展超仁	Supporting Role TVB Star Award Malaysia for Most Promising TVB Male Artiste
2013	The Hippocratic Crush II	Dr. "Ben" Benjamin Lau Bing-chan 劉炳燦	Major Supporting Role TVB Star Award Malaysia for Most Promising TVB Male Artiste
2013	Bounty Lady	Young Talent 青年才俊	Ep. 1
2014	Rear Mirror	Jason Yiu Ngai-chung 饒毅忠	Major Supporting Role
2014–2015	Tiger Cubs II	ASGT Tse Ka-sing 謝家星	Major Supporting Role
2014–2015	Noblesse Oblige	Fong Kwai-cheung 方貴祥	Major Supporting Role
2015	The Fixer	SGT Mak Hang-chik 麥行直	Major Supporting Role TVB Star Award Malaysia for Favourite TVB Supporting Actor; TVB Star Award Malaysia for Top 16 Favourite TVB Drama Characters
2016	Speed of Life	PIP Sze Ma 施馬	Main Role
2016	Over Run Over	SGT Kwok Sheung-ching 郭尚正	Major Supporting Role
2016	A Fist Within Four Walls	Duen Ying-fung / Duen Tung-tin 段迎風 / 段通天	Main Role TVB Anniversary Award for Most Popular Male Character; StarHub TVB Award for My Favourite TVB Male TV Characters; StarHub TVB Award for My Favourite TVB Onscreen Couple (with Grace Wong); TVB Star Award Malaysia for Top 15 Favourite TVB Drama Characters
2016	Rogue Emperor	Chu Cheung-fun 朱祥勳	Major Supporting Role
2017	Line Walker: The Prelude	Tsui Tin-tong 徐天堂	Main Role StarHub TVB Award for My Favourite TVB Male TV Characters    TVB Star Award Malaysia for Top 17 Favourite TVB Drama Characters
2018	Threesome	"Kai" Lee Tong-kai 利東佳	Main Role
2018	Stealing Seconds	Tsang Tung-yan 曾棟仁	Main Role TVB Anniversary Award for Favourite TVB Actor in Malaysia; TVB Anniversary Award for Favourite TVB Actor in Singapore
2018	Another Era	Walter Fong Chak-yu 方澤雨	Main Role
2019	The Defected	IP Seung Sing (Sing Sir) 尚垶 (垶Sir)	Main Role
2020	Line Waker: Bull Fight	Tsui Tin-tong 徐天堂	Main Role
2021	Murder Diary	Dr. Wai Yui-kit 韋睿傑	Main Role
2021	The Line Watchers	Senior Superintendent Hoi Fung (Fung Sir) 海鋒 (鋒Sir)	Main Role
2022	ICAC Investigators 2022	Tong Wai-chong (Tong Sir) 唐偉聰 (唐Sir)	Main Role
2022	Forensic Heroes V	Cheng Ho Yin (Cheng Sir) 井浩然 (井Sir)	Main Role
TBA	The Spectator		Guest Appearance

=== Films ===
Year	English title	Chinese title	Role
	Young and Dangerous: The Prequel	新古惑仔之少年激鬥篇	Bao Tat-ming (Chau Pei) 包達明 (巢皮)
1999	The Legend of Speed	烈火戰車2之極速傳說	Big Head Man 大頭文
1999	The Conman 1999	賭俠1999	Jack
1999	Pizza Express	薄餅速遞	
1999	There's a Ghost in the Boy's Room	鬼咁過癮	
1999	My Heart Will Go On	還我情心	
1999	A Man Called Hero	中華英雄	Seui Ho 水賀
1999	Stupid	死蠢	
1999	X Imp	鬼片王之再現凶榜	Nokia
1999	The Three Brothers	串燒三兄弟	
2000	My Good Brother	好兄吾兄	
2000	The Social Worker From the Edge	猛鬼女社工	
2000	Hong Kong Pie	香港處男	Ah Chaak 阿澤
2000	Un Baiser Vole	偷吻	
2001	Bullets of Love	不死情謎	
2001	The Avenging Fist	拳神	
2002	Fighting to Survive	一蚊雞保鏢	Debt collector 收數佬
2002	Infernal Affairs	無間道	CID officer 重案組探員
2003	Infernal Affairs III	無間道III	CIB officer 情報科探員
2004	Heat Team	重案黐孖Gun	Seun Chai 信仔
2004	Explosive City	爆裂都市	Glen's assistant
2005	It Had to Be You	後備甜心	Jill's friend
2007	The Haunted School	校墓處	Ah Man 阿文
2009	Turning Point	Laughing Gor之變節	Police officer 探員
2010	The Jade and the Pearl	翡翠明珠	Scholar Ho 何公子
2010	72 Tenants of Prosperity	七十二家房客	Sales of Shek Kin's store 石堅店售貨員
2011	I Love Hong Kong	我愛香港	Man in period costume
2019	Line Walker 2: Invisible Spy	使徒行者2: 諜影行動	John

=== Dubbing ===
- Dub of War's Second Season Graduation Project- Spider-Man: No Way Home (2022)- Peter Parker/Spider-Man (Peter 3)

=== Stage play ===
Year	English title	Chinese title	Role	Notes
2020	Let's Hunt for a "Tiger" Tonight	今晚打老虎	Chau Man-ban 周文賓	Main Role

=== Shows hosted ===
- 2001: Wire Television YMC Channel "YMC People We Wet Web"
- 2007: 終極奪獎SHOW

=== Music video appearances ===
Year	Song title	Singer	Album	Video
2007	"Doesn't Matter" (無所謂)	Janice Vidal	Wish	Video on YouTube
2009	"Please"	Janice Vidal	Wish	Video on YouTube
2009	"If Time Arrives" (如果時間來到)	Raymond Lam	Let's Get Wet	

== Awards and nominations ==
=== TVB Anniversary Awards ===
Year	Category	Drama / Role	Result
2013	Most Improved Male Artiste	A Change of Heart, Karma Rider, Always and Ever, The Hippocratic Crush II, Bounty Lady	Nominated
2015	Most Improved Male Artiste	Noblesse Oblige, The Fixer	Nominated
2015	Most Popular Male Character	The Fixer — "Mak Hang-chik"	Nominated
2016	Best Actor	A Fist Within Four Walls — "Duen Ying-fung"	Top 5
2016	Most Popular Male Character	A Fist Within Four Walls — "Duen Ying-fung"	Won
2016	Most Popular Onscreen Partnership	A Fist Within Four Walls (with Ruco Chan)	Nominated
2017	Best Actor	Line Walker: The Prelude — "Tsui Tin-Tong"	Nominated
2017	Most Popular Male Character	Line Walker: The Prelude — "Tsui Tin-Tong"	Top 5
2017	Most Popular Onscreen Partnership	Line Walker: The Prelude (with Pakho Chau and Priscilla Wong)	Nominated
2017	Most Popular Onscreen Partnership	All Work No Pay Holidays II (with Mat Yeung)	Nominated
2018	Favourite TVB Actor in Malaysia	Stealing Seconds — "Tsang Tung-yan"	Won
2018	Favourite TVB Actor in Singapore	Stealing Seconds — "Tsang Tung-yan"	Won
2018	Most Popular Male Character	Stealing Seconds — "Tsang Tung-yan"	Nominated
2018	Best Actor	Another Era — "Fong Chak-yu (Walter)"	Top 5
2018	Most Popular Onscreen Partnership	Another Era (with Pakho Chau and Gloria Tang)	Nominated
2019	Best Actor	The Defected — "Sheung Sing"	Top 5
2019	Most Popular Male Character	The Defected — "Sheung Sing"	Nominated
2019	Most Popular Onscreen Partnership	The Defected (with Oscar Leung Lit-wai)	Nominated
2019	Most Popular Onscreen Partnership	All Work No Pay Holidays III (with Mat Yeung Ming)	Nominated
2020	Best Actor	Line Walker: Bull Fight — "Tsui Tin-Tong"	Nominated
2020	Most Popular Male Character	Line Walker: Bull Fight — "Tsui Tin-Tong"	Nominated
2020	Favourite TVB Actor in Malaysia	Line Walker: Bull Fight — "Tsui Tin-Tong"	Nominated
2020	Best Show Host	The PakhoBen Outdoor Show (with Pakho Chau)	Won
2021	Best Actor	Murder Diary — "Wai Yui-kit"	Nominated
2021	Best Actor	The Line Watchers — "Hoi Fung"	Nominated
2021	Most Popular Male Character	Murder Diary — "Wai Yui-kit"	Nominated
2021	Most Popular Male Character	The Line Watchers — "Hoi Fung"	Nominated
2021	Most Popular Onscreen Partnership	The Line Watchers (with Mandy Wong)	Nominated
2021	Favourite TVB Actor in Malaysia	Murder Diary — "Wai Yui-kit"	Nominated
2021	Favourite TVB Actor in Malaysia	The Line Watchers — "Hoi Fung"	Nominated
2022	Best Actor	ICAC Investigators 2022 — "Tong Wai-chung"	Nominated
2022	Best Actor	Forensic Heroes V — "Cheng Ho-yin"	Nominated
2022	Most Popular Male Character	ICAC Investigators 2022 — "Tong Wai-chung"	Nominated
2022	Most Popular Male Character	Forensic Heroes V — "Cheng Ho-yin"	Top 10
2022	Favourite TVB Actor in Malaysia	ICAC Investigators 2022 — "Tong Wai-chung"	Nominated
2022	Favourite TVB Actor in Malaysia	Forensic Heroes V — "Cheng Ho-yin"	Nominated
2022	Most Popular Onscreen Partnership	Forensic Heroes V (with Sisley Choi Sea-pui)	Nominated

=== TVB Star Awards Malaysia ===
Year	Category	Drama / Role	Result
2013	Most Promising TVB Male Artiste	A Change of Heart, Always and Ever, The Hippocratic Crush II	Won
2013	Favourite TVB Supporting Actor	The Hippocratic Crush II — "Lau Bing-chan (Benjamin)"	Top 5
2014	Top 15 Favourite TVB Drama Characters	Tiger Cubs II — "Tse Ka-sing"	Nominated
2015	Favourite TVB Supporting Actor	The Fixer — "Mak Hang-chik"	Won
2015	Top 16 Favourite TVB Drama Characters	The Fixer — "Mak Hang-chik"	Won
2016	Favourite TVB Actor	A Fist Within Four Walls — "Duen Ying-fung"	Nominated
2016	Top 15 Favourite TVB Drama Characters	A Fist Within Four Walls — "Duen Ying-fung"	Won
2016	Favourite TVB Onscreen Couple	Speed of Life (with Natalie Tong)	Nominated
2016	Favourite TVB Onscreen Couple	A Fist Within Four Walls (with Grace Wong)	Top 3
2016	Favourite TVB Show Host	All Work No Pay Holidays (with Mat Yeung)	Won
2017	Favourite TVB Actor	Line Walker: The Prelude — "Tsui Tin-tong"	Nominated
2017	Top 17 Favourite TVB Drama Characters	Line Walker: The Prelude — "Tsui Tin-tong"	Won
2017	Favourite TVB Onscreen Couple	Line Walker: The Prelude (with Pakho Chau and Priscilla Wong)	Nominated
2017	Favourite TVB Show Host	All Work No Pay Holidays II (with Mat Yeung)	Top 5

=== StarHub TVB Awards ===
Year	Category	Drama / Role	Result
2015	My Favourite TVB Supporting Actor	The Fixer — "Mak Hang-chik"	Nominated
2016	My Favourite TVB Actor	A Fist Within Four Walls — "Duen Ying-fung"	Nominated
2016	My Favourite TVB Male TV Characters	A Fist Within Four Walls — "Duen Ying-fung"	Won
2016	Favourite TVB Onscreen Couple	Speed of Life (with Natalie Tong)	Nominated
2016	Favourite TVB Onscreen Couple	A Fist Within Four Walls (with Grace Wong)	Won
2017	My Favourite TVB Actor	Line Walker: The Prelude — "Tsui Tin-tong"	Nominated
2017	My Favourite TVB Male TV Characters	Line Walker: The Prelude — "Tsui Tin-tong"	Won
2017	Favourite TVB Variety Show Host	All Work No Pay Holidays II (with Mat Yeung)	Nominated

=== People's Choice Television Awards ===
Year	Category	Drama / Role	Result
2016	People's Choice Most Improved Male Artiste	A Fist Within Four Walls — "Duen Ying-fung"	Top 5 (Ranked 2nd)
2018	People's Choice Best Actor	Threesome — "Lee Tung-kai"	Top 5 (Ranked 3th)
2018	People's Choice Best TV Drama Partnership	Threesome (with Mandy Wong)	Top 6 (Ranked 3th)
2021	People's Choice Best Actor	Murder Diary — "Lee Tung-kai"	Nominated
2021	People's Choice Best Actor	The Line Watchers — "Hoi Fung"	Nominated
2021	People's Choice Best TV Drama Partnership	The Line Warchers (with Mandy Wong)	Nominated

=== Hong Kong Television Awards ===
Year	Award	Drama / Role	Result
2018	Best Leading Actor in Drama Series	Threesome — "Lee Tung-kai"	Top 5 (Ranked 2nd)

=== Music awards ===
Year	Award	Song	Result
2020	Jade Solid Gold Songs Election Round Two for Best Gold Songs	你與你的另一半	Won
2020	Hit Awards for Hit Composition	你與你的另一半	Won
2021	Jade Solid Gold Best 10 Awards Presentation for Most Popular Newcomer	—N/a	Won

=== Other awards ===
Year	Award	Result
1997	Yes! Magazine's "School Grass" Champion	Won
2007	Mr Hong Kong Champion	Won

Awards and achievements
Mr. Hong Kong
Preceded by Francois Huynh	Mr. Hong Kong; 2007	Succeeded by Michael Wilson Tsu
