= Sharon Chan =

Hong Kong actress

- 陳敏之
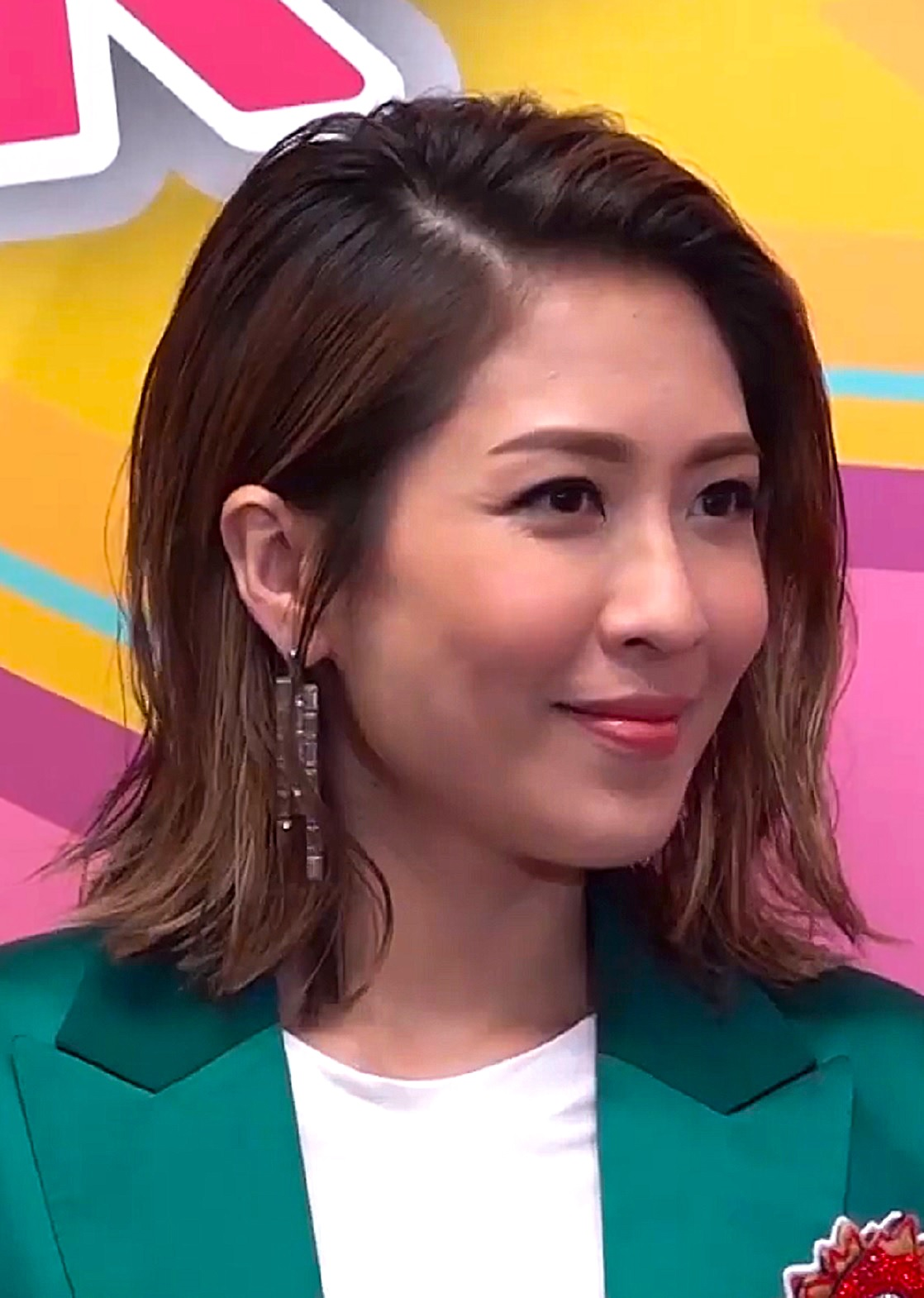
- Chan in 2019
- Born: Chan Man-Chi (陳敏芝); British Hong Kong
- Occupations: Actress; model; singer
- Years active: 1994–present (model); 2001–present (actress)
- Notable work: Ghetto Justice; Line Walker
- Awards: TVB Anniversary Awards – Best Supporting Actress; 2011 Ghetto Justice

Chinese name
- Traditional Chinese: 陳敏之
- Simplified Chinese: 陈敏之
Transcriptions
Standard Mandarin
- Hanyu Pinyin: Chén Mǐnzhī
Yue: Cantonese
- Jyutping: Can4 Man4 Zi1
- Musical career
- Also known as: Manchi

Sharon Chan Man-chi (simplified Chinese: 陈敏之; traditional Chinese: 陳敏之; Jyutping: Can4 Man4 Zi1) is a Hong Kong actress and model. She is currently under contract with TVB in Hong Kong.

== Filmography ==
=== Television dramas ===
Year	Title	Role	Notes
2002	The Trust of a Lifetime	Mon Yip Ho-ying	Supporting Role
2003	The 'W' Files	Lam Tai-yuk	Supporting Role
2003	Better-halves	Fan Tsz-kiu	Cameo
2003	Survivor's Law	Mary	Cameo
2003	Life Begins at Forty	girl on motorcycle	Cameo
2004	Summer Heat	Michelle Fong Man-yu	Cameo
2004	Dream of Colours	Ella Kwan Pik-yiu	Major Supporting Role
2004	The Last Breakthrough	Yoyo Ko Siu-yau	Major Supporting Role
2005	The Charm Beneath	Wong Hiu-ching	Major Supporting Role
2006	Lethal Weapons of Love and Passion	Hui Ye-yuet	Major Supporting Role
2006	Trimming Success	Choco Ko Cheuk Kei	Major Supporting Role
2006	Welcome to the House	Anita So Fa	Major Supporting Role
2006	Glittering Days	Carol Sheung Mei-lai	Major Supporting Role
2007	Devil's Disciples	Mok Man / Szema Suet	Main Role
2007	Word Twisters' Adventures	Noble Consort Yee	Major Supporting Role
2008	Catch Me Now	Katie Kong Kiu	Major Supporting Role
2008	Forensic Heroes II	Chao Pui-lai	Cameo (Ep. 30)
2008–2009	Pages of Treasures	Pansy Lai Pui-chi	Main Role
2009	Born Rich	"Yan" Tai Yik-yan	Major Supporting Role
2009–2010	The Beauty of the Game	Cally Tong Ho-yee	Main Role
2010	Suspects in Love	Jasmine Cheung Sze-man	Major Supporting Role
2010	Can't Buy Me Love	Princess Wing Ho	Major Supporting Role
2011	Ghetto Justice	Ho Li-ching	Major Supporting Role; TVB Anniversary Awards for Best Supporting Actress; My AOD Favourites Award 2011 for My Favourite Supporting Actress
2011	Queens of Diamonds and Hearts	Ha Ying-chun	Main Role
2012	Daddy Good Deeds	Lui Keung	Guest appearance
2012	Three Kingdoms RPG	Siu Kiu	Introduced in Ep. 17
2012	Ghetto Justice II	Ho Li-ching	Guest Appearance
2012–2013	Friendly Fire	Ai Mei-san	Main Role
2013	Awfully Lawful	Ku Ka-ying	Main Role
2013	Triumph in the Skies II	Pansy	Guest Appearance
2013	Bounty Lady	Yuen Huen / young Vivian Ngan Lai-hing	Main Role
2014	The Ultimate Addiction	Ho Sheung-yee	Main Role
2014	Line Walker	"Yan" Mok Sin-yan	Major Supporting Role; TVB Star Awards Malaysia for My Favourite Supporting Actress; TVB Star Awards Malaysia for My Favourite Top 15 Drama Characters
2016	Come with Me	Lam Ching-yi	Main Role myTV Super series
2017	Tiger Mom Blues	Claire Man Ka-hei	Main Role
2017	Heart and Greed	Venus Wong Yi-oi	Major Supporting Role
2019	The Defected	So Wai-nga	Guest Appearance
2019	The Man Who Kills Troubles	Hong Chung-yu	Main Role
2020	Forensic Heroes IV	Dr. Sammy Nam Ka-mei	Guest Star (Ep. 25–28)
2022	ICAC Investigators 2022	Chung Lai-bing	Main Role
2022	Against Darkness	Ada Lo Sin-man	Main Role
2023	The Queen of News	Yip Sun (Lisa)	Guest Appearance

=== Film ===
Year	Title	Role	Notes
1998	Ghost on Fire		TV-Movie
2001	Blue Moon	Shirley	
2001	Killing End	Ada	
2002	Happy Family	Sabrina	
2002	Dry Wood Fierce Fire	Phoebe	
2002	Sleeping with the Dead	Jane Tsang	
2002	Psychedelic Cop	BB	
2002	The Wall	one of James' girl	
2002	Love is Butterfly	Funny's friend	
2002	Love in Garden Street	Sharon	
2002	Nine Girls and a Ghost	Elaine	
2003	Home of Devil: Evil Sledge		a.k.a. House of Devil a.k.a. House of Evil: Devil Sledge
2003	Super Cop		a.k.a. Chao Ji Te Jing a.k.a. Murder in the First Degree
2003	City of SARS	Hung's sister	
2006	The Room		
2011	A Dream Team		
2013	A Secret Between Us		
2018	Keyboard Warriors		

== Books ==
- 陳敏之《戀愛敏感》

== TVB Songs ==
- Song Name : "Love Steps" (逐格重播): At Home with Love (樓住有情人主題曲) (2006)
- Song Name : "The Circle Game": Glittering Days (東方之珠片尾曲) (2006)

Awards and achievements
TVB Anniversary Awards
Preceded by Fala Chen for No Regrets	Best Supporting Actress; 2011 for Ghetto Justice	Succeeded by Nancy Wu for Gloves Come Off
My AOD Favourites Awards
Preceded by Fala Chen for No Regrets	Best Supporting Actress; 2011 for Ghetto Justice	Succeeded by Nancy Wu for Gloves Come Off
