= The Ultimate Addiction =

Hong Kong television series

- Official poster
- 點金勝手
- Genre: Drama
- Created by: Hong Kong Television Broadcasts Limited
- Written by: Pong Mei Feng 彭美鳳; Wong Siu Lung 黃小龍; Cheung Shu Kuk 張雪菊; Chum Kin Wai 譚劍偉; Wong Beng Yee 黃秉怡; Yiu Fuk Hing 邱福慶; Wong Siew Ching 黃秀清; Mok Chee Kai 莫志佳; Yong Zi Kei 容子棋; Choong Ching Lung 鍾正龍; Cheung Hui Hin 張慧賢; Oon Kum Fong 温淦鋒; Kui Yin Hwan 區彦媛; Lee Hui Yee 李慧儀
- Directed by: Yip Chan Hui 葉鎮輝; Leung Kai Yuen 梁棨源; Wong Wai Meng 黃偉明; Hui Rui Ping 許瑞平; Leung Chong Xun 梁崇勳
- Starring: Bosco Wong; Kate Tsui; Nancy Wu; Sharon Chan; Ben Wong; Elena Kong; Toby Leung; MC Jin; Gloria Tang
- Opening theme: Challenge (考驗) by Fred Cheng
- Ending theme: Tight Game (棋逢敵手) by Hubert Wu & Kate Tsui (Episode 9 onwards, original version)
- Country of origin: Hong Kong
- Original language: Cantonese
- No. of episodes: 30

Production
- Executive producer: Tommy Leung
- Producer: Chong Wai-kin
- Production location: Hong Kong
- Editors: Pong Mei Feng 彭美鳳; Ng Lap Guang 伍立光
- Running time: 45 minutes
- Production company: TVB

Original release
- Network: TVB Jade, HD Jade
- Release: 2 June – 11 July 2014

Related
- Never Dance Alone; Black Heart White Soul

The Ultimate Addiction
- Traditional Chinese: 點金勝手
- Simplified Chinese: 点金胜手
- Literal meaning: "hand of the golden touch"
Transcriptions
Standard Mandarin
- Hanyu Pinyin: Diǎn Jīn Shèng Shǒu
Yue: Cantonese
- Yale Romanization: Dím Gām Sing Sāu
- Jyutping: Dim2 Gam1 Sing3 Sau2

The Ultimate Addiction (Chinese: 點金勝手) is a 30-episode Hong Kong television drama that is produced by Chong Wai-kin for TVB. The story centers on a group of individuals working in Hong Kong's financial world and stock market. It stars Bosco Wong, Kate Tsui and Nancy Wu as the main leads. A costume fitting was held on 21 August 2013 at Tseung Kwan O TVB City Studio Four at 12:30PM.

After Episode 17, the show was blacklisted by the Chinese State Administration of Radio, Film, and Television, making it another Hong Kong television drama to be censored in Mainland China after When Heaven Burns in 2011.

== Development and casting ==
In late June 2013, TVB announced that the studios were preparing for a new drama that was "tailor-made" for Michael Miu, which he later confirmed. The following week, Bosco Wong and Sharon Chan were confirmed to star. In July 2013, Nancy Wu joined the cast, followed by Kate Tsui, Ben Wong, and Elena Kong.

On August 6, 2013, Miu dropped out due to unforeseen schedule conflicts. His role would not be replaced, and Bosco Wong would be leading from start to finish. On 10 August, Fred Cheng was confirmed to have joined the project, but left the cast in October 2013 due to his involvement in singing competition, Voice of Stars.

== Synopsis ==
Cheuk Yuk (Bosco Wong)is a major figure in the financial industry who has no problems with crossing boundaries and playing dirty tricks for his own benefits. For this, he has long been a target of the Commercial Crime Bureau. Cheuk Yuk is much obsessed in the game of money and power, such that he neglects his family and friends. His wife and master have successively died because of him; however, he still felt no remorse, and instead, his ways have even worsened. Cheuk Yuk's brother-in-law, Chow San Yung (Ben Wong), being a member of the CCB, vows to have Cheuk Yuk prosecuted and brought to justice. His senior Ho Seung Yi (Sharon Chan) and subordinate Chi Nga (Kate Tsui) also work together with him to collect evidence. San Yung, at first, had high hopes for Chi Nga and even views her as his apprentice; however, Chi Nga suddenly resigns from her position as a CCB member and joins Cheuk Yuk's company. She first gains the trust of Cheuk Yuk's second wife, Fong Ming Yu (Nancy Wu) and then assists Cheuk Yuk to battle the female tycoon of the financial industry, Chai Pui Fan (Elena Kong). Eventually, Chi Nga seems to have the entire situation under her control, and even Cheuk Yuk's fiery ambition appears to have been engulfed. In the battlefield of the financial industry, where there is countless bloodshed and slaughtering, who will decide the final victory?

== Cast and characters ==
=== The Cheuk Family ===
Cast	Role	Description
Bosco Wong	Cheuk Yuk, Damon 卓彧	Financial elite Fong Ming Yu's ex-husband Cheuk Chi Yin's elder brother Likes Chi Nga; Chi Nga's love interest Widower of Chow San Lai
Nancy Wu	Fong Ming Yu, Anson 方明瑜	Financial company executive Cheuk Yuk's ex-wife
Gloria Tang	Cheuk Chi Yin, Ginnie 卓至然	Cheuk Yuk's younger sister Died in episode 27

=== The Ho Family ===
Cast	Role	Description
Sharon Chan	Ho Seung Yi, 何雙怡	CCB Inspector, later financial company's employee Ho Seung Fei & Ho Seung Hing's elder sister Chow San Yung's fiancee Died in episode 30
Toby Leung	Ho Seung Fei 何雙菲	Police officer Taekwondo expert Ho Seung yi's and Ho Seung Hing's younger sister
Stephen Wong	Ho Seung Hing 何雙慶	Chef; Ho Seung Yi's younger brother Ho Seung Fei's older brother Pursues Cheuk Chi Yin
Lily Liew	Yung Sau Guen 容秀娟	
June Chan	Sum Ka Man 沈嘉雯	

=== Commercial Crime Bureau (CCB) ===
Cast	Role	Description
Sharon Chan	Ho Seung Yi 何雙怡	CCB Inspector, later financial company's employee commit suicide in episode 30.
Ben Wong	Chow San Yung 周辛勇	Sergeant; Cheuk Yuk's good friend Ho Seung Yi's fiance Chai Pui Fan's ex-boyfriend
MC Jin	Chu Kwok Leung 朱國亮	Police Officer
Toby Leung	Ho Seung Fei 何雙菲	Police Officer
Hinson Chou Tsz Yeung	So Yat Gaai 蘇日佳	Police Officer
Stephen Huynh	Leung Yiu Wai 梁耀威	CCB Inspector
Snow Suen	Law Oi Na 羅愛娜	Police Officer
Eric Chung	Tang Ping Kiu 鄧秉喬	Chief Inspector

=== Others ===
Cast	Role	Description
Kate Tsui	Chi Nga, Gia 資雅	CCB Inspector, later financial company's employee Likes Cheuk Yuk; Cheuk Yuk's love interest Gets close with Cheuk family to avenge her father
Elena Kong	Chai Pui Fan, Florence 柴沛勛	Chow San Yung's ex-girlfriend Stock Market Advisory Committee Chairperson; Chai's Commercial Bank Ltd CEO
Oscar Leung	Law Chun Kei 羅俊基	
Pal Sinn	Wong Ching Wah, Ken 黃正華	Fong Ming Yu's ex-boyfriend
Jack Wu	Yuen Seung Him 袁尚謙	Reporter; Chi Nga's childhood friend likes Chi Hga
Jazz Lam	Wong Ying Biu, Tiger 王英標	Financial I.T. Manager; Cheuk Yuk's friend
Timothy Cheng Tse Sing	Chui Kam Fat 崔錦發	Share market analyst Chu Kiu Chim husband
Jacqueline Wong	Chow San Lai 周辛麗	Cheuk Yuk's late wife Chow San Yung's younger sister
Apple Ha	Lo Sei Mui 魯四妹	Chow San Yung and Chow San Lai's Grandmother
Dia Yiu Ming	Yip Kai Bun, Ben 葉啟斌	Legal consultant
Law Lok Lam	Sin Cho Wai 冼祖偉	
Raymond Chiu	Yeung Ho Ming, Stanley 楊浩明	
Brian Burrell	Suen King Wing, Kingsley 孫競榮	
Jeanette Leung Ching Kok	Lee Ka Tik, Cindy 李珈迪	
Celine Ma	Chu Kiu Chim 朱嬌嬋	Chu Kwok Leung's Older sister Tea Restaurant manager Married Chui Kam Fat in episode 30
Barry Cox	Antonio Cruz	Florence's dance teacher
Yeung Chiu Hoi		
Lee Chi Sing		
Chan Min Leung		
Shally Tsang		
Leo Tsang		
Janey Yan		
Geoffrey Wong		

== Viewership ratings ==
Week	Episodes	Date	Average Points	Peaking Points
1	01－05	June 2–6, 2014	22	25
2	06－10	June 9–13, 2014	22	23
3	11－15	June 16–20, 2014	22	24
4	16－20	June 23–27, 2014	24	25
5	21－25	June 30-July 4, 2014	22	25
6	26－30	July 7–11, 2014	24	26

== International broadcast ==
- Malaysia - 8TV (Malaysia) begins 6 September 2016.
- Singapore - Mediacorp Channel U (debut 19 January 2017)
