= Another Era =

- Another Era poster
- 再創世紀
- Genre: Modern Drama; Financial thriller
- Written by: Sin Siu-ling; Choi Ting-ting
- Starring: Roger Kwok; Niki Chow; Frankie Lam; Tavia Yeung; Benjamin Yuen; Pakho Chau; Zhener Wang; Yu Zhihui; Pat Poon; Bowie Wu; Gloria Tang; Roxanne Tong; Dominic Lam; Yoyo Chen
- Opening theme: 烏托邦 by Pakho Chau
- Ending theme: 只想與你再一起 by Hana Kuk
- Country of origin: Hong Kong
- Original languages: Cantonese; Mandarin
- No. of episodes: 34 (iQiyi); 36 (TVB)

Production
- Producer: Kwan Shu-ming
- Production locations: Hong Kong; China, Shenzhen; Singapore; Philippines; Canada, Vancouver; United Kingdom, London; Switzerland; Germany, Munich; Czech Republic, Prague
- Running time: approx. 43 min
- Production companies: Television Broadcasts Limited iQiyi; CCTV; CRTP

Original release
- Network: TVB Jade; CCTV-8 iQiyi
- Release: 10 September – 28 October 2018

Related
- At the Threshold of an Era (1999-2000)

Another Era (Chinese: 再創世紀) is a 2018 drama produced by TVB, iQiyi, CCTV and CRTP. It is the sequel to At the Threshold of an Era with Roger Kwok, Niki Chow, Frankie Lam, Tavia Yeung, Benjamin Yuen and Pakho Chau as the main leads; and Linda Chung as a guest star.

The theme and storyline revolve around the development of Hong Kong's economy in the past 10 years. Production cost a total of HK$100 million and took half a year.

The cut 34-episode version was uploaded on iQiyi on 29 August 2018, and aired on CCTV-8 on 30 August 2018. The original 36 episode version aired on TVB Jade from 10 September 2018 and on Mediacorp's Channel U on 23 April 2020.

== Plot ==
The story of Another Era begins with the 2008 financial crisis. Ambitious businessman Leo Ho Ting Sang (Roger Kwok) wanted to buy out Fong Chung Yam’s (Bowie Wu) business group, but Cheuk Kai Tong (Pat Poon) stopped him in time. Furious, Leo decides to out a plan to destroy him.

Ten years later, Cheuk Kai Tong becomes one of the richest men in the city, but the psychological torment of his son’s untimely death has put him bedridden, soon followed by a coma. His daughter, Cheuk Ding Yiu (Niki Chow) learns to manage the family business, and together with her trusted accountant Ko Chit (Frankie Lam), she starts a business war with Leo. Leo’s wife Cheung Ming Hei (Tavia Yeung), Fong Chung Yam’s grandson Fong Chak Yu (Benjamin Yuen), and rookie entrepreneur Ching Hoi (Pakho Chau) also join the war, starting a new era of business politics.

== Cast ==
=== Ho family ===
| Cast | Role | Description |
|---|---|---|
| Roger Kwok 郭晉安 | Ho Tin Sang 賀天生 | Leo: Qwai Sang Group Chairman; Ngo Tong Board of Directors → Sold all of his shares; Husband of Cheung Ming Hei; Diagnosed with Alzheimer's; Arrested by Interpol in episode 36 |
| Tavia Yeung 楊怡 | Cheung Ming Hei 章明晞 | Hayley: Dawnbreak Glory Group Chairman; Qwai Sang Group Chairman from episode 28; Tin Yam Group Board Member; Chinese Chamber of Commerce Chairman; Wife of Ho Tin Sang |

=== Cheuk family ===
| Cast | Role | Description |
|---|---|---|
| Pat Poon 潘志文 | Cheuk Kai Tong 卓啟堂 | Ngo Tong Group Chairman → Executive director; Father of Cheuk Ding Gam, Cheuk Ding Miu and Cheuk Ding Yiu; Died of acute heart failure in episode 33 |
| Bond Chan 陳少邦 | Cheuk Ding Gam 卓定鑫 | Gordon: Ngo Tong Group Board Member; Died in a car accident in episode 6 |
| Jacky Yeung 楊鴻俊 | Cheuk Ding Miu 卓定淼 | Melvin: Ngo Tong Group Board Member; Died in a car accident in episode 6 |
| Niki Chow 周勵淇 | Cheuk Ding Yiu 卓定垚 | Ella: Ngo Tong Group Board Member → Chairman → Resigned in episode 26; Girlfriend of Fong Chak Yu |

=== Fong family ===
| Cast | Role | Description |
|---|---|---|
| Bowie Wu 胡楓 | Fong Chung Yam 方松蔭 | 方老爺: Tin Yam Group Chairman; Father of Fong Hau Chong; Grandfather of Fong Chak Yu; Died in episode 30 |
| Geoffrey Wong 黃子雄 | Fong Hau Chong 方孝聰 | Paul少: Father of Fong Chak Yu; Died due to drug overdose in episode 3 |
| Benjamin Yuen 袁偉豪 | Fong Chak Yu 方澤雨 | Walter: Tin Yam Group Chairman from episode 30; Boyfriend of Cheuk Ding Yiu; Killed by Ho Tin Sang in episode 34 |

=== Ko family ===
| Cast | Role | Description |
|---|---|---|
| Frankie Lam 林文龍 | Ko Chit 高哲 | Duncan: Belial Funds Asia Representative; Ngo Tong Group Board of Directors → Resigned in episode 36; Founder of Hack Net; Boyfriend of Cheng Sze Yu; Reconciled with Cheng Sze Yu in episode 36 |
| Linda Chung 鍾嘉欣 | Cheng Sze Yu 鄭思妤 | Janice: Girlfriend of Ko Chit; Reconciled with Ko Chit in episode 36; (Guest Star) |

=== Man family ===
| Cast | Role | Description |
|---|---|---|
| Dominic Lam 林嘉華 | Man Hok Lai 萬學禮 | Martin: Ruskington Asia Pacific President; Father of Man King Yin |
| Wang Zhen 王振 | Man King Yin 萬敬賢 | Kingston: Kok Yin Publishing founder |
| Gloria Tang 鄧佩儀 | Chu Siu Wai 朱小慧 | NOVOPUS member; In love with Ching Hoi |

=== Other cast ===
| Cast | Role | Description |
|---|---|---|
| Pakho Chau | Ching Hoi | Inventor, startup founder, ex boyfriend of Yuen Ling Kiu |
| Yoyo Chen 陳自瑤 | Chung Si Kei 鍾思琪 | Ada: Ruskington Group worker → Qwai Sang Group public relations manager → Board Member → Resigned in episode 36; Enepmy of Cheung Ming Hei |
| Roxanne Tong 湯洛雯 | Yuen Ling Kiu 阮令翹 | Alice: Cheung Ming Hei's secretary; Ex-girlfriend of Ching Hoi |
| Lee Shing-cheong 李成昌 | Cheung Hoi Chuen 章海泉 | Father of Cheung Ming Hei; Died of cancer in episode 25 |
| Nicole Wan 尹詩沛 | Dang Lai Tung 鄧麗瞳 | Lily: Ngo Tong Group Board of Directors; Friend of Cheuk Ding Yiu |
| Yeung Chiu Hoi 楊潮凱 | Poon Lik Sun 潘力晨 | Sun: Hack Net Member; Working for Ko Chit; Died in a car accident in episode 29 |
| Jackson Lai 黎振燁 | Foo Gin Yip 傅建業 | Transport company labour head → Cheuk Ding Yiu's assistant |
| Sabrina Yeung 楊埕 | Wong Ji Lam 王子琳 | Lydia: Mainland development assistant → Cheuk Ding Yiu's assistant |
| Yu Yuhui 余芷慧 | Kuk Duen Yi 曲端兒 | Mainland exchange student; Cooking internet celebrity; In love with Fong Chak Yu |
| Janis Chan 陳貝兒 | Chang Yi Ning 曾依寧 | Elaine: News reporter; Working for Man Hok Lai |
| Auston Lam 林師傑 | Jim Siu Chai 詹兆齊 | Enemy of Ho Tin Sang |

== Broadcast ==
| Network | Region | Broadcast Date | Time | Notes |
|---|---|---|---|---|
| CCTV-8 | China | 30 August 2018 | Daily 19:30-22:30 | iQiyi Cut Mandarin version |
| iQiyi | China | 29 August 2018; 10 September 2018 | Weekdays 21:30 | |
| TVB Jade | Hong Kong | 10 September 2018 | Weekdays 21:30 | TVB original version |

== Music ==
| Title | Type | Composer | Lyrics | Arranger(s) | Producer(s) | Performer |
|---|---|---|---|---|---|---|
| Utopia (烏托邦) | Opening theme | Alan Cheung | Sandy Chang | Randy Chow; Nick Wong | Herman Ho; Randy Chow | Pakho Chau |
| Love You Again (只想與你再一起) | Ending theme | Damon Chui | Sandy Chang | Johnny Yim | Herman Ho; Joseph Wei | Hana Kuk |
| Have Been Betrayed (為何你要背叛我) | Interlude | Alan Cheung | Sandy Chang | Alan Cheung | Herman Ho; Joseph Wei | Jinny Ng |

== Viewership ratings ==
=== TVB Jade ===
| # | Timeslot (HKT) | Week | Episode(s) | Average points |
|---|---|---|---|---|
| 1 | Mon – Fri 21:30 | 10 — 14 September 2018 | 1 — 5 | 22.1 |
| 2 | Mon – Fri 21:30 | 17 — 21 September 2018 | 6 — 10 | 22.1 |
| 3 | Mon – Fri 21:30 | 24 — 28 September 2018 | 11 — 15 | 19.7 |
| 4 | Mon – Fri 21:30 | 1 — 5 October 2018 | 16 — 20 | 22.1 |
| 5 | Mon – Fri 21:30 | 8 — 12 October 2018 | 21 — 25 | 21.3 |
| 6 | Mon – Fri 21:30 | 16 — 19 October 2018 | 26 — 29 | 23 |
| 7 | Mon – Fri 21:30 | 22 — 28 October 2018 | 30 — 36 | 22.4 |
| Total average | Mon – Fri 21:30 | | | 21.8 |

== Awards and nominations ==
| Year | Award | Category | Recipient(s) | Result |
|---|---|---|---|---|
| 2019 | New York Festivals TV & Film Awards | Best Performance By An Actress (finalist) | Tavia Yeung | Won |

== See also ==
- At the Threshold of an Era
