= Suspects in Love =

Hong Kong television series

- Official poster
- 搜下留情
- Genre: Modern Drama
- Written by: Yuen Siu Na; Yip Siu Hong
- Starring: Joe Ma; Flora Chan; Bill Chan; Sharon Chan; Him Law; Louis Yuen; Power Chan; Mandy Wong; Rain Lau
- Opening theme: "一不留神" by Joe Ma
- Country of origin: Hong Kong
- Original language: Cantonese
- No. of episodes: 20

Production
- Producer: Poon Ka Tak
- Production location: Hong Kong
- Camera setup: Multi-camera
- Running time: 45 minutes (approx.)
- Production company: TVB

Original release
- Network: TVB Jade
- Release: April 5 – May 1, 2010

Suspects in Love
- Title screen shot
- Traditional Chinese: 搜下留情
- Simplified Chinese: 搜下留情
Transcriptions
Standard Mandarin
- Hanyu Pinyin: Sōu xià liú qíng
Yue: Cantonese
- Jyutping: sau1 haa5 lau4 cing4

Suspects in Love (Chinese: 搜下留情) is a 2010 TVB modern drama series.

== Plot ==
In order to rescue her best friend Coco Kam (Lau Yuk Chui), masseuse Cheng Siu-Yan (Flora Chan) is embroiled in a triad murder case. Misconceiving that she has killed someone, Yan hides away from the police and gangsters by reluctantly returning to her long-separated father Cheng Tsun-Cheong (Shek Sau).

Cheong opens a Chinese herbal tea shop but the business is failing. Yan drags through the days stressfully until Ng Chung-Ming (Ma Tak Chung) comes into her life. Ming claims to have a secret prescription for making Chinese herbal tea but he is actually an undercover cop. By investigating Yan's case, Ming hopes to get promoted and marry his inspector girlfriend Cheung Sz-Man (Sharon Chan) at the end. Ming's supervisor Cheung Sz-Chai (Chan Kwok Bong) used to oppress him a lot and Ming lost confidence at work. However, ever since he met the cheerful Yan, Ming begins to develop his self-esteem and find his life path. His delicate relationship with Yan also starts to grow.

Ming's younger brother Ng Chung-Hong (Law Chung Him) meets Yan's younger sister Cheung Siu-Man (Mandy Wong) and love grows spontaneously. However, Yan finds out Ming's identity and she believes that the two brothers are making use of them to carry out an investigation. On the other hand, Ming learns that Yan's cousin, Leung King-Ho (Yuen Shiu Cheung), is released from jail and that he was familiar with a gang leader, so Yan is considered in connection with the case. Their blossoming relationship is thrown into turmoil as they get closer to the truth.

== Cast ==
Cast	Role	Description
Flora Chan	Cheng Siu-Yan 鄭笑欣	Herbal tea store boss Cheng Siu-Man's older sister Love triangle with Ng Chung Ming and Cheung Sz Man
Joe Ma	Ng Chung-Ming 吳仲明	Police officer Love triangle with Cheng Siu Yan and Cheung Sz Man. Ng Chung Hong and Chung Lai's older brother.In the last episode he picks Cheung Sz-Man to be his true girlfriend.
Sharon Chan	Cheung Sz-Man 張思敏 (Jasmine)	Police woman Cheung Sz-Chai's younger sister Love triangle with Ng Chung Ming and Cheng Siu Yan; Ng Chung Ming's true girlfriend in last episode.
Him Law	Ng Chung-Hong 吳仲康 (Ken)	Power Up Fitness Center boxer/boss Ng Chung-Ming's younger brother Cheng Siu Man's boyfriend
Mandy Wong	Cheng Siu-Man 鄭笑雯	Cheng Siu-Yan's younger sister Ng Chung Hong's girlfriend Cheng Tsun Cheong's daughter
Louis Yuen	Leung King-Ho 梁勁豪	A good gang member Cheng Siu Yan and Cheng Siu Man's cousin
Power Chan	Cheung Sz-Chai 張思齊	Police officer Cheung Sz-Man's older brother Ng Chung Ming's leader
Rain Lau	Kam Ho-Ho 甘可可 (Coco)	Cheng Siu Yan's good friend Cheng Tsun Cheong's lover
Bill Chan	Cheng Tsun-Cheong 鄭俊昌	Cheng Siu-Yan and Cheng Siu Man's father Herbal Tea Store owner Kam Ho Ho's lover
Natalie Wong	Ng Chung Lai 吳仲麗	Ng Chung-Ming's younger sister and Ng Chung Hong's older sister.
Benjamin Yuen	Jau Wai Tong 周偉棠	Power Up Fitness Center boxer

=== Other cast ===
Cast	Role	Description
Felix Lok	Chan Yau Keung 陳有強	Cameo, went missing in episode 1 and was revealed that he went to Philippines and died because of a sickness.
Matthew Ko		Episode 20 guest-star as Leanne Li's boyfriend Cheung Sz Man's ex-boyfriend
Leanne Li		Episode 20 guest-star as Matthew Ko's girlfriend

== Viewership ratings ==
	Week	Episodes	Average Points	Peaking Points	References
1	April 5–9, 2010	1 — 5	27	30	
2	April 12–16, 2010	6 — 10	28	—	
3	April 19–23, 2010	11 — 15	27	—	
4	April 27–29, 2010	16 — 18	28	—	
4	May 1, 2010	19 — 20	27	—	

== Awards and nominations ==
TVB Anniversary Awards (2010)

- Nominated: Best Drama
- Nominated: Best Actor (Joe Ma)
