= ICAC Investigators 2022 =

2022 Hong Kong television series

- Also known as: 廉政行動2022
- Genre: Police procedural; Action
- Written by: Cheung Fei-fan
- Directed by: Lee Kwong-yiu; Fan Yan-ming; Wong Pak-kei
- Starring: Benjamin Yuen; Shawn Tam; Sisley Choi
- Country of origin: Hong Kong
- Original language: Cantonese
- No. of episodes: 5

Production
- Executive producer: Dante Lam
- Producers: Catherina Tsang; Anita Lo
- Production location: Hong Kong
- Running time: 43 minutes
- Production company: TVB

Original release
- Network: TVB Jade; myTV Super
- Release: 1 May – 29 May 2022

Related
- ICAC Investigators

ICAC Investigators 2022 (Chinese: 廉政行動2022) is a Hong Kong crime and police procedural television series jointly produced by TVB and the Independent Commission Against Corruption. The five-episode series aired weekly on TVB Jade from 1 May to 29 May 2022. Starring Benjamin Yuen, Shawn Tam, and Sisley Choi in the lead roles, the series is adapted from real-life cases across sectors including construction, banking, and education, and was executive produced by Dante Lam. Produced with the dual purpose of entertainment and public education, it emphasizes the ICAC's investigative work and anti-corruption efforts.

== Cast ==
=== Main characters ===
- Benjamin Yuen as Tong Wai-chung, Chief Investigator of the ICAC
- Shawn Tam as Shum Ngo-ming, former ICAC investigator turned criminal
- Sisley Choi as Lee Chun-yee, ICAC investigator
- Hera Chan as Ho Siu-wing, ICAC investigator
- Daniel Chau as Wong Lok ("Rock"), ICAC investigator
- Terence Siu as Chan Lik-hang, ICAC investigator
- Jocelyn Chan as Ho Ka-yan, ICAC investigator
- Sharon Chan as Chung Lai-bing, former ICAC Chief Investigator

=== Notable episodic characters ===
- Claire Yiu as Yiu Man-ching, Shum Ngo-ming's wife
- Timothy Cheng as Lee Ming-chung, Highways Department supervisor
- Alan Kwan as Chan Kin, construction foreman
- Zoie Tam as Man Wing-yee, investment company owner
- Brian Tse as Chan Bok-tai, independent investment consultant
- Parkman Wong as Chun Pang, construction foreman
- Eddie Pang as Kam Yat-fai, construction worker
- Stephen Ho as Ching Shui-wa, construction worker
- Jack Wu as Lau Hok-si, celebrity tutor
- Carmaney Wong as Tang Lok-ching, examination staff member
- Carlo Ng as Chan Yiu-wing, police superintendent
- Michael Wai as Leung Kai-sing, nightclub manager

== Episodes ==
| No. | Title | Original release date |
|---|---|---|
| 1 | "Episode 1" | 1 May 2022 |
ICAC recruits Tong Wai-chung (Benjamin Yuen) and Shum Ngo-ming (Shawn Tam), who join the agency together and become close partners. During an early corruption investigation, Shum acts alone, is seriously injured, and leaves the ICAC. Ten years later, Tong, now a Chief Investigator, leads rookie Lee Chun-yee (Sisley Choi) and his team in investigating a Highways Department supervisor suspected of accepting benefits from a construction foreman. They successfully prosecute the suspects, but Lee's impulsive approach during the investigation reflects a similar mistake made by Shum.
| 2 | "Episode 2" | 8 May 2022 |
During an ICAC investigation into a money-laundering scheme using numerous dummy bank accounts, officers identify a mastermind behind the operation. A key accomplice is endangered but rescued by the ICAC. Investigators locate a primary suspect and prepare to arrest him, only for gang members to abduct him first. Meanwhile, the long-absent Shum returns to Hong Kong.
| 3 | "Episode 3" | 15 May 2022 |
During an ICAC investigation prompted by a tip-off, officers determine that a foreman at a construction site on Lantau Island is extorting fees from workers. Investigators recruit one worker as a cooperating witness, catch the foreman accepting bribes in a controlled operation, and successfully prosecute him. Concurrently, the team locates the site where the abducted suspect from the bank money-laundering case is being held.
| 4 | "Episode 4" | 22 May 2022 |
During an ICAC investigation prompted by an anonymous tip, officers target a prominent tutor known as the "City Tutoring King" and nicknamed "The Oracle" for his accurate predictions of examination questions. He stands accused of bribing examination staff. Undercover officers enroll in his classes to gather evidence. In the ongoing bank corruption case, after rescuing the abducted suspect, investigators learn from him who is the real mastermind. Meanwhile, Shum Ngo-ming and his family come under attack by unknown assailants.
| 5 | "Episode 5" | 29 May 2022 |
The ICAC receives an anonymous tip that a police superintendent is accepting bribes from night club operators and obtains sufficient evidence for prosecution. Meanwhile, in the bank corruption case, Shum Ngo-ming holds the money-laundering mastermind hostage after she betrays his boss. When the ICAC team arrives, Shum is pursued by gangsters but is rescued by Tong Wai-chung, and both are taken into custody.

== Production ==
The series was jointly produced by TVB and the Independent Commission Against Corruption as part of the long-running ICAC Investigators franchise. It adapts several real corruption cases investigated by the ICAC involving sectors including government departments, construction, banking and education. The series was executive produced by film director Dante Lam, marking his seventh involvement in the ICAC Investigators franchise, while the script was supervised by Cheung Fei-fan. Lam stated that the cases portrayed in this installment were designed to be closer to everyday social issues and that he contributed ideas to the storyline to portray investigators as more human rather than purely stereotypical law-enforcement figures.

== Ratings and reception ==
| Episodes | Airing dates | Ratings (Note: According to Hong Kong's TV rating system, each rating point represents approximately 64,670 viewers.) | Ref. |
|---|---|---|---|
| 1 | 1 May 2022 | 13.3 points | |
| 2 | 8 May 2022 | 12 points | |
| 3 | 15 May 2022 | 10.9 points | |
| 4 | 22 May 2022 | 11.1 points | |
| 5 | 29 May 2022 | 12.4 points | |

== Awards and nominations ==
| Year | Award | Category | Nominated work | Results | Ref. |
|---|---|---|---|---|---|
| 2022 | Asian Academy Creative Awards | Best Branded Programme or Series | ICAC Investigators 2022 | Won | |
