= The Defected =

- Official poster
- Chinese: 鐵探
- Literal meaning: Iron Detective
- Hanyu Pinyin: tié tàn
- Jyutping: tit3 taam3
- Genre: Crime drama Political thriller Action
- Created by: Chu Kang-ki
- Written by: Chu Kang-ki; Lau Siu-kwan
- Starring: Benjamin Yuen; Kara Wai; Philip Keung; Sisley Choi; Ben Wong; Grace Wong; Benz Hui; Mat Yeung; Gloria Tang; Oscar Leung; Berg Ng
- Theme music composer: Alan Cheung
- Opening theme: "Hardhearted" (鐵石心腸) by Fred Cheng
- Ending theme: "I Finally Cried" (鋼鐵有淚) by HANA
- Composer: Alan Cheung
- Country of origin: Hong Kong
- Original languages: Cantonese; Mandarin
- No. of episodes: 30

Production
- Producer: So Man-chung
- Running time: 45 minutes
- Production companies: TVB; Tencent Penguin Pictures

Original release
- Network: TVB Jade
- Release: 1 April – 10 May 2019

The Defected
- Chinese: 鐵探
- Literal meaning: "iron detective"
Transcriptions
Standard Mandarin
- Hanyu Pinyin: Tiétàn
Yue: Cantonese
- Jyutping: Tit3 Taam3

The Defected (Chinese: 鐵探; Cantonese Yale: tit tam; lit. Iron Detective) is a 2019 Hong Kong television drama produced and directed by So Man-Chung, with Carmen So serving as co-director. It is a co-production between the Hong Kong broadcasting company TVB and China's Tencent Penguin Pictures, a television production unit launched by Tencent. It stars Benjamin Yuen as Inspector Sheung Sing, a policeman who becomes embroiled in a conspiracy plaguing the high-ranking officials due to an incident that slowly costed him his life.

The drama premiered on TVB Jade in Hong Kong, Macau and on Astro On Demand in Malaysia on April 1, 2019, and aired its final episode on May 10, 2019. In Mainland China, the first five episodes were released on Tencent Video on April 1, and the next five episodes were made available for VIP members. Tencent Video released five new episodes every week. "The Defected" premiered with the highest first episode ratings since 2019, with a viewership rating of 29.5 points.

On April 5, 2019 it was announced that Netflix has purchased the rights to distribute The Defected internationally, becoming the first TVB drama to be shown on Netflix.

== Plot ==
Inspector Sheung Sing (Benjamin Yuen) miraculously survives a near-fatal shot to the head after attempting to save a colleague, but the incident leaves him with PTSD, repeatedly envisioning the event in his head over and over again. The shooter, Bingo (Philip Keung), turns out to be an undercover cop working for Chief Superintendent Man Hei-wah (Kara Wai) who actually accidentally shot Sing in an attempt to threaten Chief Man for constant abuse of power and disregard for police lives. She has been in a long power-struggle with Chief Superintendent Kan Kwok-Chu (Benz Hui) and Wan Sir (Lee Sing-cheong) for the position of Commissioner of Police, and in her endeavors to win merits to rise in power, she sets Bingo free, with intentions of getting him to provide her with intel during operations to ensure her stability in the police force goes smooth-sailing. Determined to pull Man down from power after her excessive abuse of authority in countless occasions goes out of hand, Bingo teams up with Sheung Sing to collect evidence of Man's dutiful negligence to prevent her from ascending towards the Commissioner position, only to be shot down once more.

== Cast and characters ==
=== Main cast ===
- Benjamin Yuen as Inspector Sheung Sing (尚垶; Soeng Sing) of CID → the Narcotics Bureau → the Kowloon West Regional Police Headquarters, a hard-boiled officer suffering from PTSD after being shot in the head on episode 5 by Bingo. He has a reputation for being reckless, breaking and bending the rules in the police force. In episode 29 to 30, he tries to sue Man Hei-wah for abusing her high-ranking police authority in countless operations, which he, unfortunately, lost the case, leading to his near-bankruptcy from paying litigation fees. Eventually, Sing won in the Court of Appeal later on after Samuel Ching was promoted to ACP from apprehending the major villain, nicknamed Commander of the 12th Armoured Brigade in Episode 30, as he has the authority to send a request for internal investigation towards gazetted-ranking officers. Sing Sir died at the end of episode 30 due to his recurring long-term illness resulted from being shot in the head by Bingo and worsening condition resulting from new injuries added to his head and poor recovery, ignoring Dr. Ho's instructions.
- Kara Wai as Chief Superintendent → Assistant Commissioner Man Hei-wah (萬晞華; Man Hei-waa) of the Kowloon West Regional Police Headquarters, an ambitious high police official who vies to become Hong Kong's first female Commissioner of Police. Found by her superiors to be too manipulative over her subordinates, and is not afraid to bend the rules to suit her own interests. Revealed to be ruthless enough to prevent Bingo from saving her older son, Yau Lai-chun from being murdered by Beast three years ago in order to gain an opportunity to ascend in the police force. On episode 23, she threatened Bingo, who was affiliated with the Commander, to allow the Commander to escape an ambush set up by the police, so that she could subsequently apprehend The Commander by herself in order to gain merits in the operation, but due to the Commander's escape, this decision led to the death of her younger son, Matt in episode 24. In episode 30, she was ordered to be investigated by the Civil Service Bureau which was a request sent by ACP Samuel Ching for a disciplinary hearing. The result of the disciplinary hearing investigation was to have her placed in early retirement from the Hong Kong Police Force.
- Philip Keung as Bingo (游秉高; Yau Bing-ko), an undercover cop working for Man Hei-wah, he accidentally shot and injured Sheung Sing when he was arguing with Hei-wah for killing his good brother Tai Wai in episode 5 after she did not deliver what she promised, which is to let Tai Wai go as part of Bingo's negotiation in exchange for Beast's whereabouts and his plans. After Shan Gau's death, he was assigned to infiltrate Commander's gang, managing to deliver intel with the risk of blowing his cover at times. Bingo then assisted Man Hei-wah on numerous occasions so that she could get her merits and he could start on his redemption road as he felt indebted towards Sheung Sing from injuring him previously. On episode 5, Narcotics Bureau's plans in burning of 380 Million HKD worth of drugs, were botched by Beast, but it turns out most of the drugs were recovered except drugs worth 10 Million HKD were taken by Bingo and he sold it to Chau Lik-yin, owner of a shipping company where 80% of the shipping exports containing drugs ships to Australia, where drug rates are worth 10 times more. After liaising with Hei-wah, she let him off the hook and Bingo then donated 10 Million HKD to fund Sheung Sing's brain operation anonymously. He started to have conflicts with Hei-wah when she began to act ruthlessly by threatening the people that were dear to him, such as his mother. Bingo was eventually shot and killed by Hei-wah and her sniper team under her direct orders in episode 27 for knowing too much of her dark secrets, such as the deaths of her sons from her direct involvement. Ng Sir was also killed in the accidental crossfire by Hei-wah after trying to save Bingo from being shot.
- Sisley Choi as Police Constable Jill Chiu Hei-yuet (招喜悅; Ziu Hei-Jyut), nicknamed Chiu, a former undercover cop under Matt Sir, Police Constable of the Kowloon West Regional Police Headquarters who befriends Sing and Happy Kok. Grew up with Matt Sir and has an on-and-off relationship, but knows that he has no feelings for her and was adamant until episode 23 that Matt sir realizes that he wants to take care of Chiu. Chiu grew up with a traumatic past, having been abducted and almost sexually abused by serial killer/ sex predator Luo Biu, which she eventually caught up to him as his particular Modus Operandi matches the recent crime which happened to a female victim, belonging to a Vietnamese female gangwhich aims to take down Commander's gang for annihilating their entire clan from the invasion of the 12th Armoured Brigade.
- Ben Wong as a righteous Chief Superintendent then ACP, Samuel Ching (程宇森; Ching Yu-sum) of the Complaints and Internal Investigations Branch → Kowloon West Regional Police Headquarters, a former SDU officer who tries to stop Man Hei-wah's unlawful advancements. He is a paraplegic but didn't let his condition prevent him from doing what he loves, rock-climbing. Current and Second husband of Carrie So. Dislikes Kan Kwok-chu for getting close to his wife on numerous occasions. In episode 30, He arrested the Commander who tries to use a bomb to kill him after shooting him on the leg with a gun to test if he's really disabled, and in charge of the operation that arrested his remaining followers because one of the men from the gang sold them out to the police. After his promotion to Assistant Commissioner of Police of Kowloon West Regional Police Headquarters, he sent a letter to the Civil Service Bureau to have them investigate and hold a disciplinary hearing against Hei-wah.
- Grace Wong as Yeung Hiu-yee (楊曉怡; Joeng Hiu-ji), ex-fiancée of Sheung Sing and mother of his daughter, bar owner. Puts her daughter's best interests and safety above everything. Was engaged with Dr. Hanson, but realizes that she still has feelings for Sheung Sing and have been waiting for him.
- Benz Hui as Chief Superintendent Kan Kwok-chu (簡國曙; Gaan Gwok-cyu) of the Narcotics Bureau → Police Academy → CIB, Man Hei-wah's main rival for the position of Commissioner. Nicknamed Despicable Kan, a terrible supervisor who manipulates and tries to shift blames to his subordinates when operations fall out of hand. Former supervisor of Sheung Sing and Matt Yau. The ex-husband of Carrie So, dislikes Samuel Ching because his ex-wife left him for Samuel. Indirectly he influences both Man Hei-wah and Samuel Ching to go against each other by sometimes helping one side and another to take each other down in power struggle of Kowloon West Regional Police Headquarters when it benefits him.
- Matt Yeung as Senior Inspector Matt Yau (邱勵傑; Jau Lai-git) of the Narcotics Bureau → the Kowloon West Regional Police Headquarters, Man Hei-wah's youngest son, Former handler and childhood friend of Chiu. Sheung Sing's superior whom often sides with his mother but eventually knew that his mother is ruthless enough to sacrifice his older brother and knew that she could do the same to him too and ended up siding with Sheung Sing. Confessed his feelings for Chiu in episode 24. Shot and killed by the Commander in episode 24 when he tries to pursue him during an operation.
- Gloria Tang as Police Constable Kay Kwong (鄺泳莎; Kwong Wing-saa), a rookie undercover cop recruited by Man Hei-wah to get close to Bingo who have turned against her. Later befriends Bingo. Turned against Man Hei-wah after Bingo's death.
- Oscar Leung as Sergeant Kok Wing-ching (谷永正; Guk Wing-jing) of CID → the Narcotics Bureau → the Kowloon West Regional Police Headquarters, nicknamed Happy Kok and Sing's close friend. A former undercover under Yau Lai-chun, he has gambling issues. He knows the truth behind Yau Lai-chun's death which Man Hei-wah tries to get it out of him. Suffered third-degree burns and was partially disfigured on the right side of his face by the explosion at his girlfriend, Iris Luk's apartment, caused by the Commander and his gang in episode 28.

=== Guest appearances ===
- Sharon Chan as Senior Superintendent Carrie So (蘇慧雅; So Wai-Ngaa), Samuel's wife, Ex-wife of Kan Kwo-chu
- Tony Hung as Senior Inspector Yau Lai-chun (邱勵進; Jau Lai-zeon), Hei-wah's deceased eldest son, Former handler of Happy Kok, killed by Shan Gau three years ago. Truth is that his mother, Man Hei-Wah caused his death, which could be prevented when she could have asked Bingo to intervene as Bingo was near the scene.
- Shek Sau as CP Vincent Kwok (郭展亮; Gwok Zin-Leong), the Commissioner of Police.
- KK Cheung as TK, Man Hei-wah's Lawyer in a court case that Sheung Sing tries to sue Hei-wah of abusing her high-ranking police authority in operations in episode 29 and 30.
- Mary Hon as the judge in charge of the court case that Sheung Sing tries to sue Hei-wah of abusing her high-ranking police authority in operations in episode 29 and 30.
- Priscilla Wong makes a voice cameo as Janice, ex-girlfriend of Yau Lai-chun whom Matt had feelings for.

=== Supporting ===
- Berg Ng as Dang Minh Duong (鄧明陽; Dang Ming-joeng), known as The Commander (營長), a former third army of the Vietnamese army, the twelfth armored brigade captain, Crime boss behind Beast, New Target of Bingo. Related to Yau Lai-chun and Matt Yau's death, killing them execution-style. Apprehended by CSP Samuel Ching after exchanging gunfire in episode 30.
- Joman Chiang as Iris Luk (陸蔚喬; Luk Wai-kiu), ex-lover of Happy Kok and an enemy of the Commander, died in the explosion at her apartment cause by the Commander and his gang in episode 28. Belonged to a female Vietnamese gang who aims to avenge.
- Angelina Lo as Cheung Lai-han (張麗嫻; Zoeng Lai-haan), Bingo's mom who has Alzheimer's disease Loves pork rib rice with egg.
- Vincci Pun as Sheung Ching (尚晴; Soeng Cing), Daughter of Sheung Sing and Hiu-yee.
- Brian Tse as Police ConstableChan Kwok-sing (陳國城; Can Gwok-sing) a Police Constable of CID → the Narcotics Bureau → the Kowloon West Regional Police Headquarters, a subordinate of Sheung Sing, amputated both his legs due to a bomb explosion set by Kong Ching-Lung to kill the police involved in the operation and one of his underling who sold him out.
- Dickson Yu as Police ConstableMok Sai-chiu (莫世超; Mok Sai-ciu) Police Constable of CID → the Narcotics Bureau → the Kowloon West Regional Police Headquarters, subordinate of Sheung Sing, died in an explosion during a police operation in episode 19.
- Bowie Cheung as Ching Mei-yan (程美茵; Cing Mei-yan), Police Constable of CID → the Narcotics Bureau → the Kowloon West Regional Police Headquarters, subordinate of Sheung Sing
- Sin Ho-ying as ACP Lai Yik-tai (黎奕泰; Lai Jik-taai), Supervisor of Man Hei-wah and Kan Kwok-chu. Forced to retire by CP due to pushing the blame of Bingo's escape to Sheung Sing.
- Otto Chan as Superintendent Ng Wai-chung (伍偉忠; Ng Wai-zung), Follower/subordinate of Man Hei-wah, shot and killed accidentally by Man Hei-wah in episode 27 for saving Bingo, but to no avail, as Bingo is then killed to be silenced.
- Geoffrey Wong as Dr. Hanson, Yeung Hiu-Yi's former doctor and fiance. Sheung Sing's love rival.
- Vincent Lam as Beast (山狗; Saan Gau), Former third army of the Vietnamese army, the twelfth armored soldier. Crime boss of Tai Wai and Fat Wan who plans to steal from Yim Sai-hau during a drug trade off in episode 2 but failed and Later on the police drug transport cars but fail. Shot and killed by Sheung Sing when he tries to kill Happy Kok in episode 5. Tortures Happy Kok and cuts off one of his finger, shot and killed Yau Lai-chun three year ago execution-style. A subordinate of the Commander
- Lam Lei as Tai Wai (大威), Criminal, a friend of Bingo, and underling of Beast. Shot and killed by Man Hei-wah when Bingo tries to let him get away during a police chase in episode 5
- Vivi Lee as Wong Ching-yu (王清妤; Wong Cing-jyu), Widow of Tai Wai and caretaker of Cheung Lai-Han
- Yeung Chiu-hoi as Kong Ching-lung' (江正龍; Gong Zing-lung), Triad Leader, Former underling of Yim Sai-Hau, Enemy of Happy Kok, the boyfriend of Iris Luk.
- Milkson Fong as Fat Wan (發瘟), Criminal, and underling of Shan Gau. Killed in a car accident when he tries to murder Bingo who cover was blown during an escape from a police chase in episode 4.
- Tyson Chak as Yim Sai-hau (嚴世孝; Jim Sai-hau), Criminal, Triad Leader who was in a drug trade deal that Shan Gau's gang tries to rob off. Got arrested by Narcotics Bureau police during his escape after the drug trade deal in episode 3
- Lee Shing-cheong as ACP Wan Tin-yuk (尹天昱), Assistant Commissioner of Police (CID) Man Hei-Wah’s toughest rival, also in a power struggle with Hei-Wah.

== Production ==
The Defected had been in the making since as early as 2016, when TVB announced its plans for more collaboration projects with Chinese media giants iQIYI and Tencent. Chu Kang-ki pitched the story to producer So Man-chung at around that same time, who immediately expressed interest in working on the show. For the next two years, Chu and his wife Lau Siu-kwan worked on perfecting the script. The duo drew many inspirations for the story from the Gallant Garden, a public cemetery for civil servants, specifically the 55 Hong Kong police officers buried at the cemetery. The Gallant Garden is also a setting that appears frequently throughout the show. Chu said the story of The Defected is a homage to 90's era Hong Kong police films and television dramas, in which bravery and honour were central themes.

Casting began soon after the script for The Defected was completed. Kara Wai was the first choice to play Man Hei-wah, an ambitious and ruthless police official who vies to become the first female commissioner of police. Benjamin Yuen lost 20 pounds for his role as Sheung Sing.
