= Peric lee =

Peric Lee
- Born: 李偉; March 4, 1966 (age 60); Fujian, China
- Education: Master Sc. Clinical Dermatology (London) M.B., B.S. (H.K.U) Diploma in Child Health (RCP & S.Ireland) Diploma in Child Health (RCP London) Diploma in Dermatology (RCP&S)
- Occupations: Doctor; Singer
- Musical career
- Genres: Pop; Cantopop; Mandopop; Adult contemporary
- Instruments: Vocals; Guitar
- Website: periclee.com

Peric Lee (李偉) (born March 4, 1966) is a Chinese singer of various English, Mandarin and Cantonese Songs. He was featured in Headlines Magazine twice, once following the 2013 release of To Fall in Love along with well-known artists such as Gabrielle Alpin, and another following his Hifi mandarin album release 恰似妳的深情 in 2016

== Singing career ==
Since 1997 January, Peric Lee began his career as a freelance singer, and has appeared in many community and professional projects, including Cantonese theme songs for the Disney movies Lion King II and the main character of "The Hunchback of Notre Dame", as well as vocal parts for "You Belong to My Heart" in "Everlasting Regret", a movie directed by Hong Kong film director Stanley Kwan.

Apart from movie songs, Peric has also recorded more than twenty vocal backings for Polygram Karaoke. He was invited to perform in Hong Kong Coliseum as an Elvis Presley impersonator during 1997 Return to China Celebration.

In 2013, he released the HiFi CD To Fall in Love, and was regarded by HiFi magazines as having a 'sentimental crystal voice'. Together with Astor Fong, they dueted an original "The Way We Were" in the same record. Following this, Peric was invited to perform as guest in the "Carpenter Once More" show 2013 in KITEC Star Hall. In 2016, Peric released a Mandarin album, "恰似妳的深情".

On December 30, 2014, Peric, along with other musicians such as Joe Junior was invited by Warmhearters 暖心族 to perform in a Charity show for China's Mountain Range students.

== Appearances ==
- Disney: Lion King II (Cantonese Theme Song)
- Disney: The Hunchback of Notre Dame (Main Character's Cantonese singing voice)
- Everlasting Regret (Directed by Stanley Kwan): You Belong to My Heart
- Polygram Karaoke: 20+ vocal backings
- 2013 Album： To Fall In Love

- 2016 Album： 恰似妳的深情

== Release dates of albums ==
=== 2013 ===
- To Fall in Love – (HiFi CD)
1. Can't Help Falling in Love
2. Besame Mucho
3. Blue Moon/Moon River
4. The Way We Were (Duet with Astor Fong
5. Too Proud
6. Dream A Little Dream of Me
7. Tennessee Waltz
8. Fly Me to the Moon
9. I'll Never Fall in Love Again
10. For All We Know

=== 2016 ===
- 恰似妳的深情 – Mandarin album (HiFi SACD)
1. 卡門
2. 愛你變成害你
3. 恰似你的溫柔 (方文合唱)
4. 淚的小雨
5. 我怎麼哭了
6. 不了情
7. 再見,我的愛人
8. 我和你(北國之春)
9. 情入的眼淚
10. 最後一夜
