= Noblesse Oblige (TV series) =

Hong Kong television series

- Official poster
- Also known as: Top Quality Petty Official 極品芝麻品; The Beauty of Bureaucracy 官場浮世繪
- 宦海奇官
- Genre: Period drama, Historical fiction, Comedy
- Created by: Hong Kong Television Broadcasts Limited
- Written by: Tsui Tat-choh, Wong Yeh-lik, Yu Chau-tung, Ho Sai-kit, Ng Pui-yee, Mak Bing-wah
- Starring: Kenneth Ma; Tavia Yeung; Joel Chan; Benjamin Yuen; Lau Dan; Yoyo Chen; Cilla Kung; Ram Chiang; Susan Tse; Henry Lee
- Theme music composer: Alan Cheung
- Opening theme: Gossip (是非) by Ronald Law & Grace Wong
- Country of origin: Hong Kong
- Original language: Cantonese
- No. of episodes: 21

Production
- Executive producer: Catherine Tsang
- Producer: Lee Tim-sing
- Production location: Hong Kong
- Editors: Tsui Tat-choh, Siu Long
- Camera setup: Multi camera
- Running time: 45 minutes
- Production company: TVB

Original release
- Network: TVB Jade, HD Jade
- Release: 29 December 2014 – 24 January 2015

Noblesse Oblige
- Chinese: 宦海奇官
- Literal meaning: "The Realm of Unusual Officials"
Transcriptions
Standard Mandarin
- Hanyu Pinyin: huàn hǎi qí guān
Yue: Cantonese
- Yale Romanization: waahn hói kèih gūn
- Jyutping: waan6 hoi2 kei4 gun1

Noblesse Oblige (Chinese: 宦海奇官; Jyutping: waan6 hoi2 kei4 gun1; Cantonese Yale: waahn hói kèih gūn; literally "The Realm of Unusual Officials") is a 2014 till 2015 Hong Kong period drama set during the later years of Kangxi Emperor's Qing dynasty rule. Produced by Lee Tim-sing, it stars Kenneth Ma, Tavia Yeung as the main leads, with Joel Chan, Benjamin Yuen, Ram Chiang and Cilla Kung as the major supporting cast. The drama was filmed from January till April 2014. First original broadcast began on Hong Kong's Jade and HD Jade channels December 29, 2014 till January 24, 2015 every Monday through Friday during its 8:30-9:30 pm timeslot with a total of 21 episodes, the last two episodes were aired on the same night as a two-hour finale.

This is Kenneth Ma and Tavia Yeung's fifth collaboration. The two previously starred together in The Mysteries of Love, The Hippocratic Crush l & ll and Three Kingdoms RPG.

This is also Joel Chan's first drama since previously quitting acting to concentrate on his personal life.

== Synopsis ==
"Noblesse Oblige" is a French term meaning those who are privileged are obligated to help those that are less fortunate.

To Chun-fung (Kenneth Ma) is the illegitimate son of an affluent banking family during the Qing dynasty, but due to his birth title and his step-mothers he doesn't have much ambitions in life. Wanting to help the poor people in his county he decides to borrow money from his father and open a unique kind of bank. Instead of currency, his bank lends tools to people so that they can be employed. When nuns to-be Wai Lam (Tavia Yeung) and Wai Yu (Cilla Kung) borrows from Chun-fung's bank to renovate their monastery and is unable to pay him back they are forced to be his personal servants and body guards.

Prince Yu (Ram Chiang) takes notice of Chun-fung's clever idea and pushes him to be a government magistrate. Wanting to eradicate corrupted officials and with the help of Prince Yu, his older half-brother To Chun-ming (Joel Chan), who is the imperial governor of their province, and help of his best-friend Fong Gwai-cheung (Benjamin Yuen), Chun-fung becomes a magistrate. With Lam and Yu's protection against those who want to retaliate Chun-fung's cleansing of corruption he is able to take down many corrupted government officials but he is faced with having to choose doing right or family when one of the corrupted officials is Chun-ming.

== Cast ==
=== Main cast ===
- Kenneth Ma as To Chun-fung 杜振鋒
- Tavia Yeung as Wai Lam 惠琳
- Joel Chan as To Chun-ming 杜振銘
- Benjamin Yuen as Fong Gwai-cheung 方貴祥
- Ram Chiang as Prince Yu 裕親王
- Cilla Kung as Wai Yu 惠瑜

=== To family ===
- Lau Dan as To Chor-lam 杜楚南
- Susan Tse as Tong Yun-ching 唐婉貞
- Celine Ma as Ho Sau-yee 何秀儀
- Lily Poon as Chiu Siu-yin 趙小燕
- Janey Yan as Chui Suk-chau 崔素秋
- Dolby Kwan as To Chun-kwan 杜振鈞
- Leo Tsang as Ma Sing 馬誠
- Jenny Wong as head maid Lau 劉大媽
- Feifei Chu as Heung Miu 香梅
- Ice Chow as Heung Lan 香蘭
- Melody Ng as Law Siu-ying 羅小螢

=== Imperial Qing Dynasty court ===
- Gary Chan as Kangxi Emperor 康熙帝
- Li Shing-cheong as Wing Bak-hin 榮伯軒
- Eric Li as Sek Si-suen 石之信
- Eddie Law as Suk Tat 索達
- Chan Wing-chun as Official Chu 朱公旦
- Joseph Yeung as Gwan Gin-yan 關建仁
- Ricky Lee as Yu Ding-fan 余定帆

=== Extended cast ===
- Yoyo Chen as Bak Hau-ling 白巧靈
- Yu Chi-ming as Koo Jun-on 顧仲安
- Vincent Cheung as Wu Jo-gwong 胡祖光
- Sunny Tai as On Tai-hoi 安大海
- Sam Tsang as Man Sai-coeng 萬世昌
- Rainbow Ching as Mrs. Ci-yan 慈恩師太
- Akai Lee as Nap Lan Yi-tai 納蘭爾泰
- Wendy Hon as Man Fung-ying 文鳳英
- Wong Wai-tong as Kwok Yung 郭勇
- Joe Junior as Fan Sai-si 范西斯
- Shally Tsang as Wai Yuk 惠珏
- Andy Sui as Ng Ching-hung 吳正鴻
- Wang Wai-tak as Lam Jin-leung 林展良
- Chan Min-leung as Tin Yi-nau 田二牛
- Helen Ng as Mok San-leung 莫三娘
- Eddie Li as Luk San 陸山
- Mok Wai-man as Fung Hok-tak馮鶴德
- Louis Szeto as Suen Ho-yin 孫浩然
- Kedar Wong as Ching Hau-lai 程孝禮
- Chan Dik-hak as real Miu Fat 妙法真人
- Albert Law as Cho Koon-nam 曹冠南
- Ngai Wai-man as Sung Chi-yuen 宋致遠
- So Lai-ming as Sung Chi-yuen's wife 宋致遠之妻
- Ho Chun-hin as Koo Ceok-tin 古卓天
- Rocky Cheng as killer 殺手

== Development ==
- The title during early developments of the drama was "Top Quality Petty Official 極品芝麻品", because producer Lee Tim-sing thought the title sounded too simple it was changed to "The Beauty of Bureaucracy 官場浮世繪" during start of production. During post-production of the drama the title was once again changed to the confirmed title "Noblesse Oblige 宦海奇官'.
- The costume fitting ceremony was held on January 23, 2014 12:45 p.m. at Tseung Kwan O TVB City Studio One.
- The blessing ceremony was held on February 18, 2014 at Tseung Kwan O TVB City.
- An early preview if Noblesse Oblige was shown at FILMART 2014 in April 2014.

== Viewership Ratings ==
#	Timeslot (HKT)	Week	Episode(s)	Average points	Peaking points
1	Mon – Fri 20:30	29 Dec 2014 - 02 Jan 2015	1 — 5	24	27
2	Mon – Fri 20:30	05-08 Jan 2015	6 — 10	26	29
3	Mon – Fri 20:30	12-16 Jan 2015	11 — 15	25	29
4	Mon – Fri 20:30	19-24 Jan 2015	16 — 21	26	28
Total average				25.3	29

== Awards and nominations ==
Year	Ceremony	Category	Nominee	Result
2015	StarHub TVB Awards	My Favourite TVB Actor	Kenneth Ma	Nominated
2015	StarHub TVB Awards	My Favourite TVB Male TV Character	Kenneth Ma	Won
2015	TVB Anniversary Awards	TVB Anniversary Award for Best Drama	Noblesse Oblige	Nominated
2015	TVB Anniversary Awards	TVB Anniversary Award for Favourite Drama Song	Gossip (是非) by Ronald Law & Grace Wong	Nominated

== International Broadcast ==
- Malaysia - 8TV (Malaysia)
