= Word Twisters' Adventures =

- Poster
- 鐵咀銀牙
- Genre: Costume Comedy
- Starring: Charmaine Sheh; Jordan Chan; Michael Tse
- Opening theme: "扭計王" by Jordan Chan
- Country of origin: Hong Kong
- Original language: Cantonese
- No. of episodes: 20

Production
- Producer: Terry Tong
- Running time: 45 minutes (approx.)

Original release
- Network: TVB
- Release: November 5 – December 1, 2007

Word Twisters' Adventures (Traditional Chinese: 鐵咀銀牙) is a TVB costume comedy series broadcast in November 2007.

== Plot ==
In a Qing Dynasty, the most difficult thing for an articulate legal expert is not to win a lawsuit but to bargain for a twit of fate. Plagued by a mysterious family curse, Chan Mung-Kat, who comes from a legal family, is forced by his mother to fool around and devotes all his time to running a brothel despite his great talent. As a result of a careless mistake, he is embroiled in a legal dispute, through which he gets to know the eloquent Lap Lan Ching-Ching, though Lap Lan Ching-Ching was the only reason for the legal dispute and he knew her before, and the government opponent Fong Tong-Kan. Kat has developed a strong hatred towards Ching and Kaan since being innocently accused.

Ching's articulation has not only won her a legal gown bestowed by the Qianlong Emperor but also an arranged marriage (But this was not the emperor's will. It was part of Wo Shen's evil plan to ruin Fong Tong-Kan. Wo Shen had told the emperor that he would arrange a marriage for Lap Lan Ching-Ching and Fong Tong-Kan, but instead chose the most disgusting man in the city, Chan Mung-Kat). Despite her love for Kan, Ching cannot decline the Emperor's offer and finally agrees to marry Kat. The lovelorn Kan lingers at the brothel day and night, leading himself to get caught up in a murder. Ching tries to save Kan but in vain. Luckily Kat offers to help and manages to pull Kan out of the trouble. Ching has got a different impression of Kat and the incident has once again reminded Kat of the curse and the potential danger of getting involved in any kinds of lawsuits. Kat gets framed later on and Ching is left to deal with the case all on her own. To everyone's surprise, the curse has now been shifted on to Kat

== Cast ==
Cast	Role	Description
Charmaine Sheh	Lap Lan Ching-Ching 納蘭青青	First Chinese Female Lawyer; Lap Lan-Gan's daughter. Chan Mung-Kat's wife.
Jordan Chan	Chan Mung-Kat 陳夢吉	Poon Bak-Fung's son. Lap Lan Ching-Ching's husband.
Michael Tse	Fong Tong-Kan 方唐鏡	Lawyer
Kara Hui	Poon Bak-Fung 潘白鳳	Chan Mung-Kat's mother.
Yuen Wah	Lap Lan-Gan 納蘭耿	Lap Lan Ching-Ching's father.
Sharon Chan	Yi-Fei/Wong Hou 儀妃/皇后	Empress
Wu Fung	Kan Lung Wong Dai 乾隆皇帝	Emperor
Suki Chui	Lau Yi-Yi 柳依依	Singer; Fong Dong-Kan's wife.
Lo Chun Shun (魯振順)	Wo Shen 和珅	Emperor's Assistant

== Viewership ratings ==
	Week	Episode	Average Points	Peaking Points	References
1	November 5–9, 2007	1 — 5	29	32	
2	November 12–16, 2007	6 — 10	29	31	
3	November 20–23, 2007	11 — 14	29	34	
4	November 26–30, 2007	15 — 19	30	—	
4	December 1, 2007	20	26	28	

== Awards and nominations ==
41st TVB Anniversary Awards (2008)

- "Best Drama"
- "My Favourite Female Character" (Charmaine Sheh - Lap Lan Ching-Ching)
