= Speed of Life (TV series) =

Hong Kong television drama

- Official poster
- Also known as: When the Motorcycle Meets the Car (當鐵馬遇上戰車)
- 鐵馬戰車
- Genre: Modern Drama, Police procedural
- Created by: Hong Kong Television Broadcasts Limited
- Written by: Shek Hoi-ting, Tsui Dat-chor, Cheng Sing-mo
- Directed by: Cheng Wing-kei, Wong Wai-yip, Kwok Ka-hei, Ng Chui-wing
- Starring: Kenny Wong; Benjamin Yuen; Natalie Tong; Sisley Choi; Carlo Ng; Rachel Kan; Raymond Cho; Pierre Ngo; KK Cheung
- Theme music composer: Damon Chui
- Opening theme: Same Pace (同步) by Justin Lo
- Country of origin: Hong Kong
- Original language: Cantonese
- No. of episodes: 20

Production
- Executive producer: Catherine Tsang
- Producer: Andy Chan
- Production location: Hong Kong
- Editors: Shek Hoi-ting, Tsui Dat-chor, Cheng Sing-mo
- Camera setup: Multi camera
- Running time: 45 minutes
- Production company: TVB

Original release
- Network: TVB Jade, HD Jade
- Release: 18 January – 7 February 2016

Speed of Life
- Traditional Chinese: 鐵馬戰車
- Simplified Chinese: 铁马战车
- Cantonese Yale: Titmáh Jinchē
- Literal meaning: "Motorcycle, Car"
Transcriptions
Standard Mandarin
- Hanyu Pinyin: Tiěmǎ Zhànchē
- Bopomofo: ㄊㄧㄝˇㄇㄚˇ ㄓㄢˋㄔㄜ
Yue: Cantonese
- Yale Romanization: Titmáh Jinchē
- Jyutping: Tit3maa5 Zin3ce1
- IPA: [tʰīːt̚.ma̬ː tsīːn.tsʰɛ́ː]

Speed of Life (Chinese: 鐵馬戰車; Cantonese Yale: Titmáh Jinchē; literally "Motorcycle, Car") is a 2016 Hong Kong police procedural television drama created and produced by TVB, starring Kenny Wong, Benjamin Yuen, Natalie Tong and Sisley Choi as the main leads. Filming took place from October 2014 till January 2015 on location in Hong Kong. The drama premiered January 18, 2016 on Hong Kong's Jade and HD Jade channels, airing Monday through Sunday during its 9:30-10:30 pm timeslot, concluding February 7, 2016 with a total of 20 episodes.

The drama centers on the Hong Kong Police Force traffic branch, Enforcement and Control Unit（E&C）which enforces traffic laws and the Accident Investigation Division (AI) that is responsible for investigating traffic related accidents.

== Synopsis ==
The Hong Kong Police Force Traffic Branch is divided into two departments. The Enforcement and Control Unit（E&C）is in charge of enforcing traffic laws and arresting those who break them while the Accident Investigation Division (AI) investigates traffic related accidents.

To Cheuk-fung (Kenny Wong) is the Inspector In-charge of the E&C Unit. His stern and cold appearance makes him an awkward character to work with and is also unapproachable to his subordinates, but his dedication and demand in his job also makes his family life non-existent. When the former Police Commissioner's daughter Bui Sam-jou (Sisley Choi), who everyone calls Bui Baby, is assigned to his unit and put under his supervision he is not afraid to lecture her when he thinks she has done wrong even though all other senior ranking officers are afraid to offend her due to respect for her father. Bui Baby is dedicated and, wanting to show her full potential, takes To Sir's comments seriously to improve herself. After seeing Bui Baby's passion and commitment to her job, and her being the only one not afraid to approach him when he is down, the two form a mentor and protege relationship.

To Sir's other problems are his former subordinate Sze Ma (Benjamin Yuen) has just been promoted to Inspector in the AI division. Sze Ma's odd behavior often is misunderstood and offends other people. Due to his behavior the E&C team thinks he has forgotten about them now that he is with AI, causing a slight rivalry between the two divisions.

However Sze Ma is also very dedicated to his job and often only sleeps a few hours a day while trying to solve cases. It also makes his life non-social which results to him talking to a toy basketball he named Jason as if it was a real person. He notices that his new subordinate Yiu Yiu (Natalie Tong) who has been a dedicated officer with a great reputation for her photographic memory, no longer gives her full potential at work and always leaves on time due to the haunting memory of her parents' deaths. Wanting to help her get past the tragedy and to push her to her former self, Sze Ma uses odd tactics that end up offending her. Yiu Yiu, who can't stand Sze Ma, doesn't know that he has fallen in love with her while working closely with her, with even Sze Ma himself scared of these feelings at first since Yiu Yiu doesn't fit his usual tall and long leg type.

== Cases ==
Bridal Car / Deliver Truck Accident Ep. 1-3

When a delivery truck carrying illegal fireworks rear ends a bridal car it is assumed that the delivery truck caused the accident but with evidence showing the delivery truck's windshield was struck by an unknown object causing the accident, newly promoted AI Inspector Sze Ma Sir must try to solve who really caused the accident. The Best Man driving the bridal car claims the delivery truck crashed into him but testimony from the truck drivers claimed an object struck their windshield and that the bridal car was swiveling right and left on the road.

Sleepy Mini Bus Driver Ep. 4-5

On her first day at E&C, Bui Sam-jou is assigned to go undercover and ticket bus drivers who do not comply with the law. When she unreasonably tickets a driver with a total of 8 tickets, the driver does the extreme by drinking energy drinks in order to work extra shifts to pay off the tickets. Bui Baby happens to be a regular passenger on the same bus driver vehicle during one of these extreme shifts and witnessed the occurrence of an accident. She sees the driver of the private car acting unusual and also the bus driver falling asleep at the wheel. When the bus driver is charged with vehicular homicide, Bui Baby does her best to remember every detail and keeps recanting her statement. Her eagerness to clear the bus driver causes her to offend the AI team and Sze Ma Sir in front of high-ranking officials.

Drug Trafficking Ep. 6-9

To Sir's former subordinate in Narcotics Bureau and protege Wing Tak-him has been taunting traffic officers by dangerously speeding in traffic. To Sir tries to bring down Tak-him who is now a drug trafficker but doing so reopens the past that could hurt his career. Madam So's late husband Au Suen-wai was also a subordinate under To Sir in Narcotics Bureau, however Suen-wai's gambling addiction got him entangled with Tak-him illegal dealings and ultimately caused his death. In order to cover Suen-wai illegal activities, To Sir lied to let him die honorably. To avenge for the past, Tak-him uses conversations he recorded with Suen-wai to blackmail To Sir and then tries to kill To Sir's son, but Tak-him's rash behavior gets him in trouble with the triad community when he steals another gangs drug shipment. To escape Hong Kong he holds To Sir's son hostage in order to force To Sir's wife into helping him escape.

Concert Tickets Ep. 10-12

Concert tickets for Korean girl group Amazing Girls has become so sought after that Bui Baby and Tai Gwan find a middle aged taxi lady and a young man on a motor bike fighting about tickets on the street. Later the taxi lady and young man get involve in a traffic accident and the young man eventually dies from his injuries. The taxi lady is charged with murder but Yiu Yiu believes she is innocent due to the taxi lady's interest with a particular member of the Amazing Girls and tries to convince Sze Ma Sir that she is right. Sze Ma Sir who only believes in data does not succumb to Yiu Yiu's reasons and continues using his odd way to solve the case. Eventually on the day of the Amazing Girls concert they all find out the true culprit behind the accident and it's the person with the concert tickets in their hand.

Sky Rover Hit and Run Ep. 13-14

An elderly lady with no identification on her is involved in a hit and run that leaves her in a coma. The driver who crashed into the elderly lady states that a Sky Rover van was driving towards him at high speeds and in order to avoid it he accidentally crashed into the elderly lady, but with no other witnesses the AI team must find out if he is telling the truth. With only a key found on the elderly lady and no one filing a missing person report, the AI team has the daunting task of finding out what the key unlocks and who she is. Short on staff with no one wanting to take on this task, Sze Ma Sir ask if the E&C team can lend them a person. To Sir agrees but lends the AI team his most unskilled team member which is Bui Baby. Bui Baby's dedication to the task helps the AI team solve the mystery of the elderly lady's identity within days and also solve how the entire accident happen when she spends her personal time finding out if the Sky Rover van exist.

Driving While High On Drugs Ep. 15-16

The AI team has a hit and run case that should be easily solved since a few surveillance cameras captured only the victim and suspect at the accident scene but not how it happened. However, due to the recent rain storm any other evidence has been washed away from the accident scene and also the suspect has a high powered attorney who is also his brother protecting him. To determine how the accident happened Sze Ma must reconstruct it with the expensive sports car the suspect was driving. Since the suspect is unwilling to lend his sports car to the police Sze Ma resorts to asking the only other person in Hong Kong that has the same exact sports car, which is his on and off girlfriend Pearl's other boyfriend.

Jail Break Ep. 1,17-20

Dangerous criminal Hung Fan's wife Chui Ying, who is also a wanted criminal herself, is planning to break him out of prison on the day of his trial. With the help of Hung Fan's sworn brother Hung Yan, who is impersonating as a reporter doing a story on Bui Baby, he uses his newfound friendship with Bui Baby to get close to her in order to exact revenge for Hung Fan's imprisonment, which Bui Baby helped with capturing. Besides revenge Hung Yan also bugs Bui Baby in order to stay one step ahead of the authorize to facilitate his brother's escape.

== Cast ==
=== Hong Kong Police Force ===
Accident Investigation Division (AI)

- Mandy Lam as Chiu Cho-wan (招彩雲)

Madam Chiu, Superintendent of AI and Sze Ma Sir's supervisor. She has a slight rivalry with the E&C team as she wants to show that her team is better.

- Natalie Tong as Yiu Yiu (姚瑤)

An officer under Sze Ma Sir's supervision. She also manages her late parents garden nursery which leads her to get off work on time every day. Haunted by the death of her parents death she neglects her photographic memory until she becomes the sole witness of a child pedophile murder case. She can't stand Sze Ma Sir because of his offending and odd behavior which leads to her destroying his ball Jason. She later falls in love with Sze Ma without knowing when she starts to think about him, but truly realizes her it when she gets jealous seeing him with his on and off girlfriend Pearl. After finding out how Sze Ma feels about her from the false case, the two kiss and start dating and later thinks about marriage and kids.

- Benjamin Yuen as Sze Ma (施馬)

Sze Ma Sir. Newly promoted Inspector to the AI division and previously a probationary inspector under the supervision of To Sir. A cocky show off, his odd behavior is often misunderstood and causes him to offend others. He neglects social life and sleep, dedicating his time to solving cases, replacing social time with a toy basketball named Jason as his best friend. After witnessing Yiu Yiu's kindness towards a wrongly accused suspect he starts to have growing feelings for her leaving his heart beating whenever he is near her, but not realising what these feelings are that causes him to be afraid around her. Once he realises his feelings for Yiu Yiu, Yiu Yiu gives Jason a companion basketball that she names Janet in reference to her. Sze Ma gives Yiu Yiu a false case to solve which he codes with a message of how he feels about her and they later date and start to think about marriage.

- Mark Ma as Yeung Ming (揚名;homophone to "Mat Yeung's name 楊明" )

A Sergeant in the AI team. Sze Ma Sir's subordinate and only human friend even before Sze Ma was promoted to the AI team. An expert mechanic and photographer, he is in charge of photographing crime scenes. He often helps Sze Ma reconstruct accident scenes.

- Kelvin Chan as Yan heung-wing (殷向榮)
- Janice Shum as Miu Hei-tong (苗希彤)
- Chiu Lok-yin as Chow Chi-kan (周梓勤)
- Ka Chun as Fong Lap-jun (方立俊)

Senior officers

- KK Cheung as Kwok Keung (郭強)

Kwok Sir, Senior Superintendent in charge of the entire traffic division.

- Billy Cheung as Chung Man-Kwong (鍾萬光)

Current Commissioner of Police.
Criminal Investigation Department (CID)

- Stephen Ho as Wu Yiv-kven (鄔耀權)

Wu Sir, Inspector of the Crime Unit. He does not like Bui Baby since she ruined his team's sting operation and took credit for the capture of wanted criminal Hung Fan and letting his wife Chui Ying escape.

- Hinson Chou as Lee Man-ho (李文浩;homophone to "Lee Min-ho's name 李敏鎬" )
- Akai Lee as CID officer
- Alex Lam as CID officer
- Kelvin Lee as CID officer
- Tristan Cheung as CID officer
- Marco Lee as CID officer
- Vincent Wong as CID officer
- Samuel Lau as CID officer
- Max Choi as CID officer

Administration

- Eileen Yeow as Margaret Chiu Kei-tse (趙其姿)

Head of Administration at the police department. She does not like Bui Baby because Biu Baby always buys her usual lunch from the canteen.

- Darren Wong as Suen (信)
- Jeoffrey Wong as Ben

Other staff

- Andy Sui as Brother Yin (賢哥)

Owner and manager of the precinct canteen.
Enforcement and Control Unit（E&C）

- Carlo Ng as Pok Tze-pang (薄子鵬; nicknamed P Sir)

Pok Sir but wants everyone to call him P Sir. Superintendent of E&C Unit and To Sir's superior. He constantly wants to become friends with all his subordinates but no one takes him seriously.

- Kenny Wong as To Cheuk-fung (杜卓峯)

To Sir , Inspector of the E&C Unit and a former Narcotics Bureau detective. Vi Lee's husband and To Kai-chung's father. A stern but reasonable superior whose subordinate become fearful when he shows his anger. Due to the demands of his job his family life is non-existent. Being betrayed by a former subordinate during his time in the Narcotics Bureau he does not want to become close with his subordinates in E&C. He later develops a mentor-protege relationship with Bui Baby but her skillfulness on the job worries him. After Bui Baby is transferred to AI for an extended period he starts to regret thinking she is not skilled enough. Wanting to spend more time with his family and to avoid disciplinary punishment for lying about Au Suen-wai's illegal dealings which gave Susan spousal insurance for honorary police officers who die in the line of duty.he decides to retire early.

- Celine Ma as Susan So-san (蘇珊)

Madam So, Station Sergeant for E&C who is in charge of assigning vehicles to the E&C officers. The To family long-time friend since her late husband Au Suen-wai was To Sir's subordinate in the Narcotics Bureau. She is the voice of reason in the department and usually helps the officers resolves issues with higher ranks and claims To Sir. She later on dates Tai Gwan.

- Raymond Tsang as Wang Tai-yeung (汪大洋)

Wang Sir, Sergeant in charge of the road crew. Also long-time friends of the To family and Susan. His job caused his marriage to break apart because not happy with life after immigrating to Canada he returned to Hong Kong alone to continue his profession as a police officer.

- Sin Ho-ying as Tai Gwan (戴軍; nicknamed Tai Gwan 大軍 which means "general" in Chinese)

Senior Police Officer who is in charge of guiding rookie officers but his hot temper and impatiens end up scaring the rookies. He later dates Madam So.

- Man Yeung as Lam Sam (林森; nicknamed Ah Man 阿Man)
- Kong Fu-keung as Chan Ken-fu (陳健富; nicknamed Dou Bah 刀疤 which means "scar" in Chinese)
- Fanny Ip as Shum Siu-bik (沈少碧; nicknamed Ah Fan 阿粉)
- Calvin Chan as Calvin Cheuk Yat-long (卓日朗; nicknamed Ah Long 阿朗)

A young officer who has a huge crush on Biu Baby after seeing internet photage of her taking down a wanted criminal.

- Aurora Li as Ng Ka-kei (伍嘉琪; nicknamed Kung Fu mei 功夫妹 which means "Kung Fu younger sister" in Chinese)

The previous rookie on E&C until Bui Baby came to the team. She has a crush on Yeung Ming from AI but he doesn't return her feelings and is scared of her.

- Sisley Choi as Bui Sam-jou (貝心柔; nicknamed Bui Baby 貝Baby & Siu Keung 小強, "cockroach" in Hong Kong slang)

A newly assigned officer to E&C. Her father is the former Chief Superintendent Police, Bui Chi-hung, which makes all the senior rank officers afraid to offend her. A rookie cop who is unskilled but eager to show her potential and work on big cases right away. She does things by the books even if it is unreasonable, which causes To Sir to sternly lecture her, but seeing her passion in her job, the two later form a mentor-protege relationship. She is later switched to AI when they are short on staff and Sze Ma Sir seeing potential in her but also hearing that To Sir thinks she is useless. To Sir nicknames her Siu Keung, cockroach in Hong Kong slang because of her won't be defeated attitude. She later start dating To Sir's son To Kai-chung.

- Lily Ho as Kan Tai-wai (靳大維)

A new officer who comes on broad when Bui Baby is switched to AI. She is switched to the Criminal Intelligence Bureau (CIB) when Bui Baby returns to E&C.

- Tracy Chu as Cheung Ching-ching (張清清; nicknamed Siu Siu 水水)

Cameo appearance. New officer who also becomes Calvin Cheuk Yat-long's new love interest.

=== Extended cast ===
To family

- Rachel Kan as Vi Lee Suk-wah (李淑樺)

To Sir's long suffering wife and To Kai-chung mother. She and To Cheuk-fung are in a non-communicating marriage due to the demands of his job.

- Sky Chiu as To Kai-chung (杜啟聰)

To Sir and Vi Lee's young adult son. He and his father had a non-existent relationship until they both found a common interest in motorcycles. After befriending Bui Sam-jou during his father's injury that two later start dating.

Au family

- Raymond Cho as Au Suen-wai (歐順威)

Susan So's died husband who was a former Narcotics officer under To Sir. His gambling addiction and burrowing money from loan sharks got him entangled with corrupt officer Wing Tak-him's illegal activist.

- Kevin Yau as Dave

Au Suen-wai and Susan So's young adult son who just returned to Hong Kong after dropping out of University abroad. He is an unfilial son who does not listen or respect his mother. His relationship with his mother improves after his so called friend Alvis tries to frame him for drunk driving, proving that his mother was correct about his friend being a bad influence.

Yiu family & Garden nursery staff

- Au Wai-kuen as Yiu Ching-leung (姚正樑)

Yiu Yiu's father and Fung Dai-dai's husband. Original owner of the garden nursery. He and his wife died while en route to a vacation destination.

- Helen Ng as Fung Dai-dai(馮帶娣)

Yiu Yiu's mother and Yiu Ching-leung's wife. Died along with her husband while en route to a vacation destination.

- Chan Min-leung as Fuk Chuen(福全)

An elderly man who help Yiu Yiu manage the garden nursery. He treats Yiu Yiu as a family member.

- Dick Chan as Brother Gei(雞哥)

Delivery driver for the garden nursery.

- Alan Tam Kwan Lun as Ng Kin (吳健)

A mentally challenge man who works at the nursery.

- Aris Li as Ng Hong (吳康)

A mentally challenge man who works at the nursery.

Bui family

- Pat Poon as Bui Chi-hung (貝子雄)

Bui Sam-yau's father and Hing's husband. A retired Chief Superintendent Police who most of the senior police officers still respects.

- Edith Au as Hing (卿)

Bui Sam-yau's mother and Bui Chi-hung's wife. She is a regular housewife.

Other extended cast

- Toby Chan as Pearl Ho Pui-chong (賀珮中)

Sze Ma's on and off girlfriend. A lab technician at the Hong Kong Government Laboratory. Sze Ma seems to only look for her when he needs her help to solve cases.

- Jason Chan as Don Chiu (趙公子)

One of Ho Pui-chong's suitors. He is a rich hotel heir and eventually proposes to Pearl.

- Pauline Chow as Jenny

Wang Tai-yeung's wife and later ex-wife. Feeling abandoned in Canada when her husband returns to Hong Kong to resume as a police officer she starts an affair with her next door neighbor Andy whom she later marries. She becomes pregnant and her relationship with her ex-husband improves.

- Au Hin-Wai as Andy

The Wang's Canada neighbor and Jenny's lover. He becomes Jenny's new husband when she divorces Wang Tai-yeung.

- English Tang as Yeung Ying-hung (楊應洪)

Defense lawyer of the child pedophile murder case.

- Gregory Lee as Ming (銘)

A constant traffic rule breaker who the E&C team have arrested many times.

- Alan Wan as Passer-by (途人)

A tourist who ask Pok Sir for directions.

- Joe Junior as Dou Wan-choi (刀允才)

Sze Ma's University professor.

- Jarryd Tam as Alvis

Dave's friend who tried to frame him for drunk driving.

=== Cases cast ===
Bridal Car / Deliver Truck Accident Ep. 1-3

- Hugo Wong as Peter Cheung Chi-hin (張志軒)

Best man of the bridal party. Unhappy that both of his friends where getting married because he is in-love with the bride.

- Kitterick Yiu as Paul

Groom of the bridal party who met his wife at his friend Peter's birthday party.

- Kayley Chung as Mary

Bride of the bridal party who met her husband at her friend Peter's birthday party.

- Raymond Lo as Truck driver (貨車司機)
- Tsang Hoi-cheong as Truck passenger (貨車乘客)
- Kim Li as Truck passenger (貨車乘客)

Sleepy Mini Bus Driver Ep. 4-5

- Wong Wai Tong as Kuen (權)

Driver of the passenger car. While investigating the case Sze Ma Sir uncovers his unhealthy eating habits.

- Chow Nin (周年)

Mini bus driver whom Bui Baby unreasonably ticketed.
Drug Trafficking Ep. 6-9

- Pierre Ngo as Wing Tak-him (榮德謙)

A former corrupted Narcotics officer under To Sir who is now a drug trafficker.

- Raymond Chiu as Brother Kwan (坤哥)

Wing Tak-him's triad boss. He kicks Tak-him out of his gang when Tak-him steals from another gang.

- Parkman Wong as Brother Sing-mo (成武哥)

A triad boss whom Wing Tak-him stole a drug shipment from and had Au Suen-wai resell to him. Au Suen-wai's killer.

- Joseph Yeung as Wai Sir (威Sir)

Senior officer in the Narcotics Bureau.

- Willie Wai as Heroin Sing (戴馬成)

A Mainland triad boss that Wing Tak-him steals a drug shipment from. He reports the drug robbery to the police where he becomes a laughing stock.
Concert Tickets Ep. 10-12

- Rosanne Lui as Kwan Fuan-lan (關歡蘭)

A middle aged female taxi driver. Cho Suk-wai's biological maternal-grandmother. She was a former drug addict who did drugs together with her daughter.

- Louis Szeto Ho Wan-yin (何允然)

An Amazing Girls Fan Club member who constantly bickered with Kwan Fuan-lan. An unskilled motorcycle driver who dies when his bike is tampered with.

- Lee Yee-man as Wan Choi-fung (溫彩鳳)

Ho Wan-yin's sister-in-law. She is Chinese Malaysian who immigrated to Hong Kong after marrying Ching. Unhappy with her living arrangement because of her brother-in-law.

- Jones Lee as Ching (正)

Ho Wan-yin's elder brother and Wan Choi-fung's husband. Carry to much for his younger brother he constantly let him have his ways even if it upsets his wife.

- Gloria Tang as Cho Suk-wai (崔素慧)

A member of the Korean group Amazing Girls. Kwan Fuan-lan's biological granddaughter who was adapted by a Korean couple when she was a toddler.

- MoMo Wu as Kwan Fuan-lan's daughter (關歡蘭之女)

Kwan Fuan-lan's daughter and Cho Suk-wai's mother. A drug addict who died of an overdose.

- Wingto Lam as Carol

Amazing Girls Hong Kong fan club president. Sze Ma Sir's fake flirts with her to try to solve the case.
Sky Rover Hit and Run Ep. 13-14

- Kelvin Yuen as Fu Chi-sing (傅智星)

Driver of a delivery van that injured Kam Tai-mui.

- Hero Yuen as Roy Ng Tze-lap (伍志立)

Driver of the Sky Rover and a biker.

- Go Yi-hang as Kam Tai-mui (金大妹)

Elderly lady who gets injured in a car accident.

- Ngai Wai-man as Cheng Tze-yung (鄭志勇)

Kam Tai-mui's son who works mostly in Mainland China so he is rarely home.

- Shally Tsang as Heung May-may (香美美)

A good Samaritan who tended to an injured Kam Tai-mui.
Driving While High On Drugs Ep. 15-16

- Jayden Kau as Siu Ka-hei (蕭家熙)

A rich heir driving the luxury sports car that is suspected of killing the victim.

- Glen Lee as Siu Ka-no (蕭家諾)

Siu Ka-hei's older brother and his lawyer. He is later Hung Fan's lawyer and get involved in car accident at the end, after mocking the officers from the traffic branch.
Jail Break Ep. 1,17-20

- Vincent Lam as Hung Fan (熊番)

A dangerous wanted criminal that Bui Baby helped captured and then sent to prison.

- Meini Cheung as Siu Ying (肖英)

Nicknamed One Eye Ying because she has cataracts on her left eye. Hung Fan's wife who is also a wanted criminal. She and his gang plan for his escape while he awaits trial.

- Jack Wu as Hung Yan (熊仁; real name Hung Kwok-lap 熊國立)

Hung Fan's sworn brother. Pretending to be a reporter, he uses this status to get close to Bui Baby in order to exact revenge for his brother.

- Ken Law as Hung Nau (熊牛)

Hung Fan's gang member and sworn brother who gets betray by Hung Yan during their escape from authorizes.

== Development and production ==
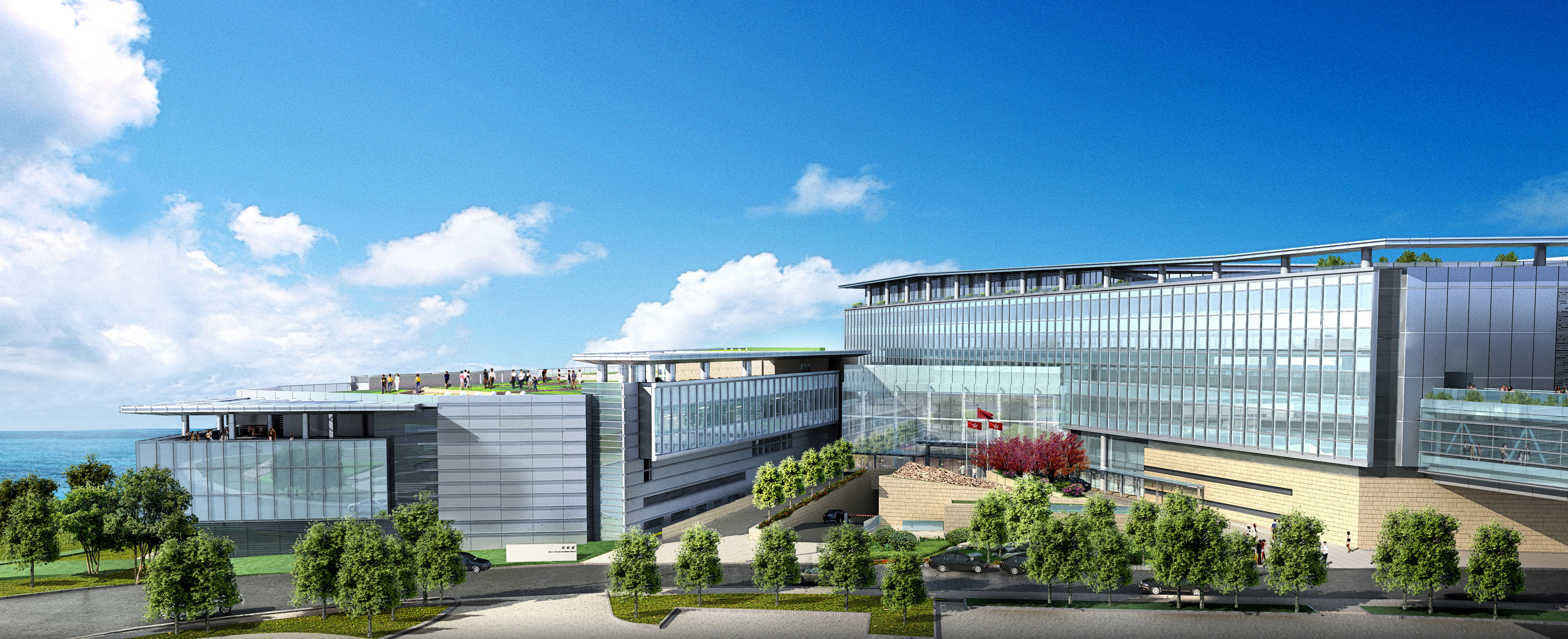
Hong Kong Civil Aviation Department Headquarters. Lantau Island, Hong Kong

- The drama was titled When the Motorcycle Meets the Car (當鐵馬遇上戰車) during early developments and post-production.
- The costume fitting and blessing ceremony was held simultaneously on October 10, 2014 12:30 pm at Tseung Kwan O TVB City Studio One Parking Lot.
- Filming took place from October 2014 till January 2015, entirely on location in Hong Kong.
- The Hong Kong Civil Aviation Department Headquarters building and lobby served as the exterior and lobby of the Hong Kong Police department depicted in the drama.
- Primary police vehicles used is the BMW R900RT motorcycle. Mercedes-Benz Sprinter van and Nissan Tiida car also makes a brief appearance in a few scenes.

== Viewership ratings ==
Timeslot (HKT)	#	Day(s)	Week	Episode(s)	Average points	Peaking points
Mon - Sun (9:30-10:30 pm); 21:30–22:30	1	Mon - Fri	18 - 22 Jan 2016	1 — 5	26	29
Mon - Sun (9:30-10:30 pm); 21:30–22:30	1	Sun	24 Jan 2016	6	26	--
Mon - Sun (9:30-10:30 pm); 21:30–22:30	2	Mon - Fri	25 - 29 Jan 2016	7 — 11	27	30
Mon - Sun (9:30-10:30 pm); 21:30–22:30	2	Sat	30 Jan 2016	12	22	--
Mon - Sun (9:30-10:30 pm); 21:30–22:30	2	Sun	31 Jan 2016	13	25	--
Mon - Sun (9:30-10:30 pm); 21:30–22:30	3	Mon - Fri	01 - 05 Feb 2016	14 — 18	28	29
Mon - Sun (9:30-10:30 pm); 21:30–22:30	3	Sat	06 Feb 2016	19	25	--
Mon - Sun (9:30-10:30 pm); 21:30–22:30	3	Sun	07 Feb 2016	20	24	26
Total average					26	30

January 23, 2016: No episode broadcast due to airing of 2016 Miss Chinese International Pageant.

== International broadcast ==
Network	Country	Airing Date	Timeslot
Astro On Demand	Malaysia	January 18, 2016	Monday – Sunday 9:30 – 10:30 pm
NTV7	Malaysia	February 13, 2018	Monday – Sunday 11:00 pm – 12:00 am
TVBJ	Australia	January 19, 2016	Monday – Friday 8:15 – 9:15 am
TVBJ	Australia	January 19, 2016	Saturday – Sunday 9:00 – 10:00 pm
Starhub TV	Singapore	April 21, 2016	Monday – Friday 9:00 – 10:00 pm

== Awards and nominations ==
Year	Ceremony	Category	Nominee	Result
2016	StarHub TVB Awards	My Favourite TVB Drama	Speed of Life	Nominated
2016	StarHub TVB Awards	My Favourite Onscreen Couple	Natalie Tong & Benjamin Yuen	Nominated
2016	TVB Star Awards Malaysia	My Favourite TVB Drama Series	Speed of Life	Nominated
2016	TVB Star Awards Malaysia	My Favourite TVB Actress in a Leading Role	Natalie Tong	Nominated Top 5
2016	TVB Star Awards Malaysia	My Favourite TVB On Screen Couple	Natalie Tong & Benjamin Yuen	Nominated
2016	TVB Star Awards Malaysia	My Favourite Top 15 TVB Drama Characters	Natalie Tong	Won
2016	TVB Star Awards Malaysia	My Favourite Top 15 TVB Drama Characters	Kenny Wong	Nominated
2016	TVB Anniversary Awards	Best Series	Speed of Life	Nominated
2016	TVB Anniversary Awards	Best Actress	Natalie Tong	Nominated Top 5
2016	TVB Anniversary Awards	Most Popular TV Female Character	Natalie Tong	Nominated Top 5
2016	TVB Anniversary Awards	Best Supporting Actress	Rachel Kan	Nominated
2016	TVB Anniversary Awards	Most Popular Series Song	Same Pace (同步) by Justin Lo	Nominated
