= Catch Me Now =

- Catch Me Now poster
- 原來愛上賊
- Genre: Modern Action
- Written by: Lau Choi Wan; Law Chung Yiu
- Starring: Damian Lau; Joe Ma; Idy Chan; Fala Chen; Johnson Lee; Evergreen Mak; Sharon Chan
- Country of origin: Hong Kong
- Original language: Cantonese
- No. of episodes: 20

Production
- Producer: Chong Wai-kin
- Running time: 45 minutes (approx.)

Original release
- Network: TVB
- Release: April 21 – May 16, 2008

Catch Me Now (Traditional Chinese: 原來愛上賊) is a TVB modern action series broadcast in April 2008.

== Synopsis ==
Ko Chit (Damian Lau) lost his parents in an accidental fire during his teenage years, mourning with resignation until he discovers the fire was caused by a wealthy businessman's greed. This incident changes his entire belief system and morals. Ko Chit threatens the businessman by robbing a large sum of his money (and subsequently donating it to various charities) and pretending to murder his son in front of him, warning the businessman to do better because he will always be watching.

Years later, Ko Chit has become a criminal mastermind, forming a group of modern-day Robin Hoods consisting of four other members:

- Tam Bun / Ben / BT (Johnson Lee): BT is Ko Chit's younger cousin and an excellent hacker. He was kicked out of a prestigious university for hacking the school system.
- Kwan Yan / Keyman (Wilson Tsui): Keyman is the locksmith and bomb-maker of the group. Ko Chit previously hired him to fix a lock, but Ko Chit also saved his life by offering a chance to make more money with him so Keyman wouldn't commit suicide due to financial struggles. He's married but his wife's family didn't think highly of him as a locksmith until he started bringing in money from the thieving jobs.
- Che Hei Sin / Hau Lo (Eric Li): Hau Lo is the getaway driver. As a teen, he participated in gang activities and stole and raced cars for fun. One day, Hau Lo stole Ko Chit's car and could've escaped but instead swerved and crashed to avoid hitting a pedestrian. Sensing compassion and needing a getaway driver, Ko Chit led him out of the gang life and invited him to join his group.
- Wong Ming Cheung / Cheung Geuk Hai or "Long-Legged Crab" (Koni Lui): Cheung Geuk Hai is the gunner. Born in the Middle East, she was around guns all the time and knows her way around them. After moving to Hong Kong as an aspiring actress, she had trouble scoring major roles in the entertainment industry. After rejecting a director's sexual advances, she was targeted by gang members sent by the director but saved by Ko Chit. Her nickname comes from her long legs.

With their group working together like a well-oiled machine, they've successfully robbed millions with still millions donated to charities anonymously through Ko Chit's lawyer and friend, Charles Fan (Joseph Lee).

Unfortunately, things start to get complicated when they cross paths with CID Senior Inspector Kong Yeung (Joe Ma), leading to a battle of wits. While Ko Chit has his eye set on stealing from Chiu Kwan-Ho (Evergreen Mak), a greedy tycoon and drug dealer, Kong Yeung is also honing in on their identities. Things become more heated when Kong Yeung realizes that Ko Chit may have been responsible for his mentor's murder that took place five years ago, adding to his aggression for nailing Ko Chit. However, not everything can be seen as black and white...

== Cast ==
Cast	Role	Description
Damian Lau	Ko Chit (高哲) / Brother Jack (Jack哥)	Restaurant Owner Gentleman Thief & Mastermind of the Robin Hood group Tam Bun's cousin Yung-Yung's boyfriend Kong Yeung's frenemy Chiu Kwan Ho's enemy Shot by a policeman (original ending) / Arrested by Kong Yeung (alternative ending)
Joe Ma	Kong Yeung (江揚) / Kong Sir (江Sir)	C.I.D. Senior Inspector Hong Mei-Lei's husband Kong Wing-Keung's son Kong Kiu's older brother Ko Chit's frenemy Chiu Kwan Ho's enemy
Idy Chan	Bao Yung-Yung (包蓉蓉)	Banker Ko Chit's girlfriend Hon Ying-Kit's ex-wife Hong Mei-Lei's friend
Fala Chen	Hong Mei-Lei (康美莉) / Minnie	Banker; Kong Yeung's wife Bao Yung-Yung's friend
Johnson Lee	Tam Bun (譚彬) / Ben "BT" Tam	Hacker & Computer Technician Member of Ko Chit's group Ko Chit's cousin Kong Kiu's boyfriend Killed in an explosion set by Chiu Kwan-Ho in Episode 19
Wilson Tsui (艾威)	Kwan Yan (關仁) / "Keyman"	Locksmith Member of Ko Chit's group Chow Suk-Moon's husband
Eric Li (李天翔)	Che Hei-Sin (車喜善) / Hao Lo (姣佬)	Auto shop owner & taxi driver Member of Ko Chit's group
Koni Lui	Wang Ming-Chuen (汪明翔) / Cheung Geuk Hai (長腳蟹), "Long-Legged Crab"	Actress & Model Member of Ko Chit's group
Henry Lee	Cheng Sheung-Mo (鄭尚武) / Lo Cheng (老鄭)	C.I.D. Sergeant Lau Yu-Chiu's best friend
Dickson Lee (李家聲)	Yau Dai-Hoi (游大海)	C.I.D. Probation Inspector Kong Yeung's second-in-command Shum On-Na's boyfriend
Aimee Chan	Shum On-Na (沈安娜) / Nana	C.I.D. Constable; Yau Dai-Hoi's girlfriend
Evergreen Mak	Chiu Kwan-Ho (趙君豪)	Tycoon & drug dealer Chiu King-Shum's son Ko Chit & Kong Yeung's enemy Shot by Kong Yeung in Episode 20
Kong Hon	Chiu King-Shum (趙經琛)	Philanthropist; Chiu Kwan Ho's father
Sharon Chan	Kong Kiu (江翹); Ah Kiu (阿翹)	Security firm consultant Kong Wing-Keung's daughter Kong Yeung's younger sister Tam Bun's girlfriend
Lo Mang	Kong Wing-Keung (江永強)	Kong Yeung & Kong Kiu's father
Sherming Yiu (姚樂怡)	Pinky	Restaurant Manager
Joseph Lee (李國麟)	Fan Kwok-Hin (范國軒) / Charles	Lawyer Ko Chit's friend Flora's boyfriend
Yvonne Lam (林漪娸)	Flora	Banker; Charles Fan's girlfriend Minnie & Yung-Yung's supervisor
June Chan (陳琪)	Chow Suk-Moon (周淑滿)	Kwan Yan's wife
Law Lok-lam	Lau Yu-Chiu (劉宇超)	C.I.D. Sergeant; Kong Yeung's mentor
Timothy Cheng (鄭子誠)	Hong Ying-Kit (韓英杰)	Bao Yung-Yung's ex-husband Arrested in Episode 16
Suki Tsui	Jenny	A staff member of Lee Sing Bank

== Alternate ending ==
According to the producer, the series originally had three different endings planned out, but the cast argued that the ending in which Ko Chit died would be the most memorable. Thus, the official ending has Ko Chit shot by police in gun firing chaos. However, as the audience wanted a perfect ending, TVB decided to create an alternate ending which became available online at TVB.com five minutes after the original airing date and time of the last episode.

== Viewership ratings ==
	Week	Episode	Average Points	Peaking Points	References
1	April 21–25, 2008	1 — 5	31	34	
2	April 28 - May 2, 2008	6 — 10	32	36	
3	May 5–9, 2008	11 — 15	32	34	
4	May 12–16, 2008	16 — 20	33	38	

== Awards and nominations ==
41st TVB Anniversary Awards (2008)

- "Best Drama"
- "Best Actor in a Leading Role" (Damian Lau - Jack Ko Chit)
- "Best Actor in a Supporting Role" (Johnson Lee - Ben Tam Bun)
- "Best Actress in a Supporting Role" (Sharon Chan - Kong Kiu)
