= TVB Anniversary Award for Most Improved Female Artiste =

Hong Kong television award

- Awarded for: "Most Improved Performance by a Female Artiste"
- Country: Hong Kong
- Presented by: Television Broadcasts Limited (TVB)
- First award: 1998
- Currently held by: Sophie Yip (2025)
- Website: http://birthday.tvb.com/

The TVB Anniversary Award for Most Improved Female Artiste is one of the TVB Anniversary Awards presented annually by Television Broadcasts Limited (TVB) to recognize a female artiste who has delivered improving performances in Hong Kong television dramas or variety shows throughout the designated year.

The Most Improved Award was first introduced in 1998. It was separated into two categories—Most Improved On-screen Performance Award—Drama (螢幕大躍進獎—戲劇組) and Most Improved On-screen Performance Award—Non-drama (螢幕大躍進獎—非戲劇組), to individually recognize actors and variety presenters. The award was re-established in 2002, changing its name to My Favourite Most Improved Female Artiste of the Year (本年度我最喜愛的飛躍進步女藝員). In 2005, the name was changed to Most Improved Female Artiste (飛躍進步女藝員).

== Winners and nominees ==
Table key
†	Indicates the winner

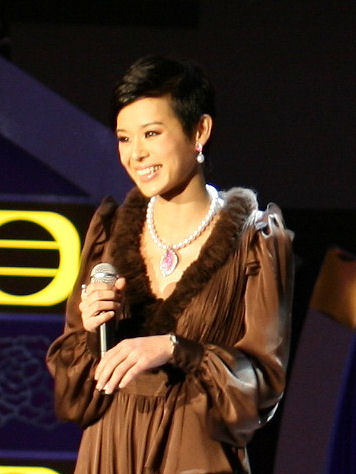
Myolie Wu won in 2002 for her performance in Golden Faith.

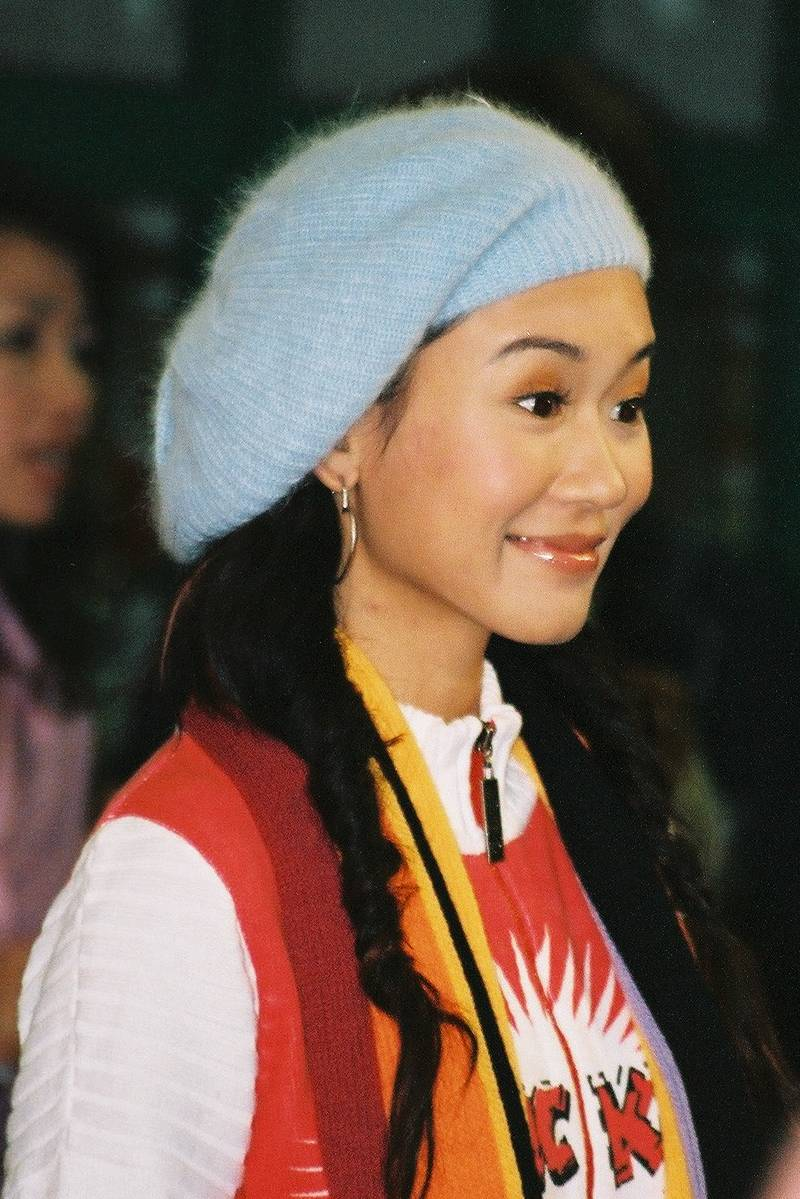
Shirley Yeung won in 2004 for her performance in Angels of Mission.

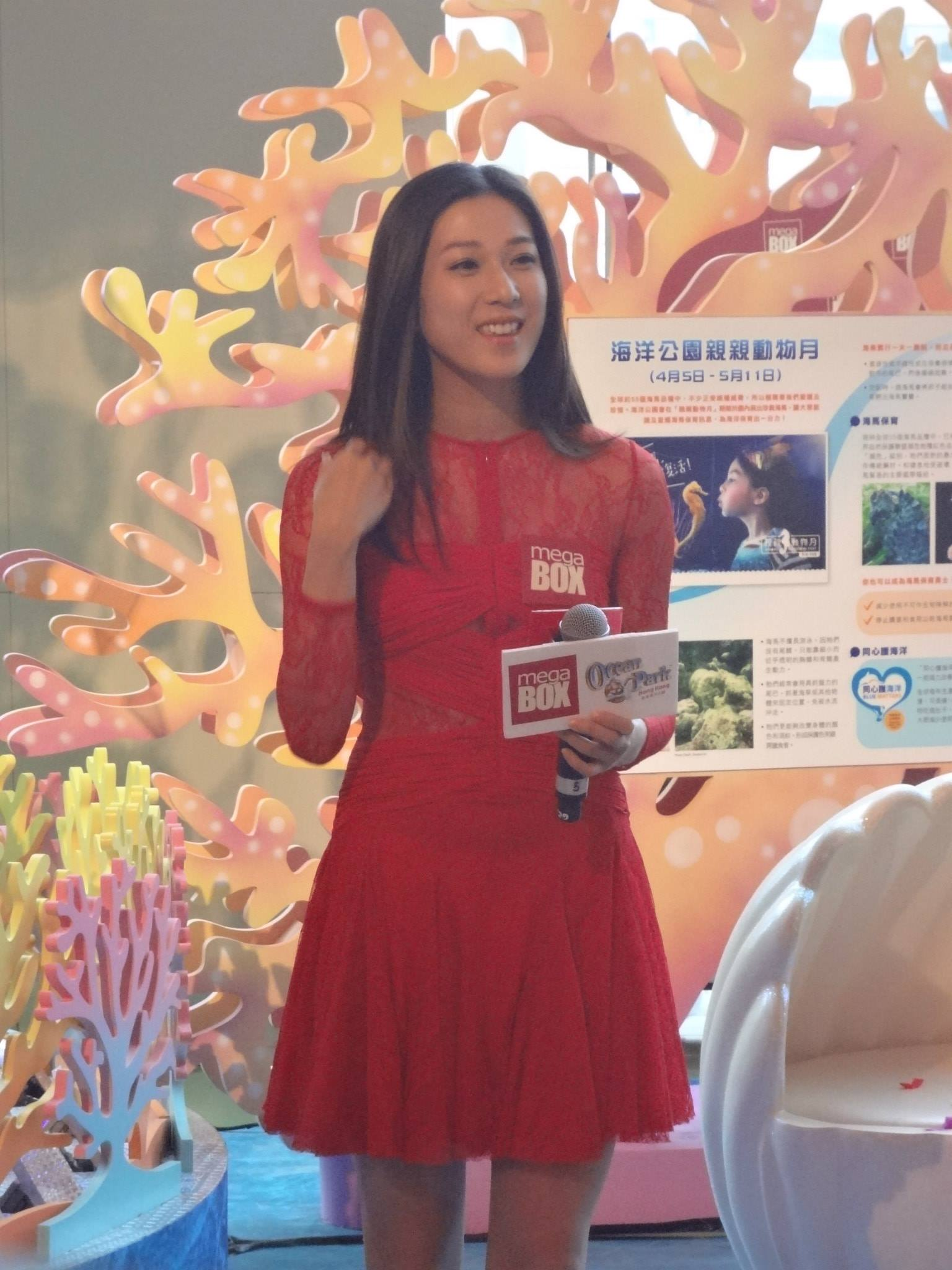
Linda Chung won in 2006.

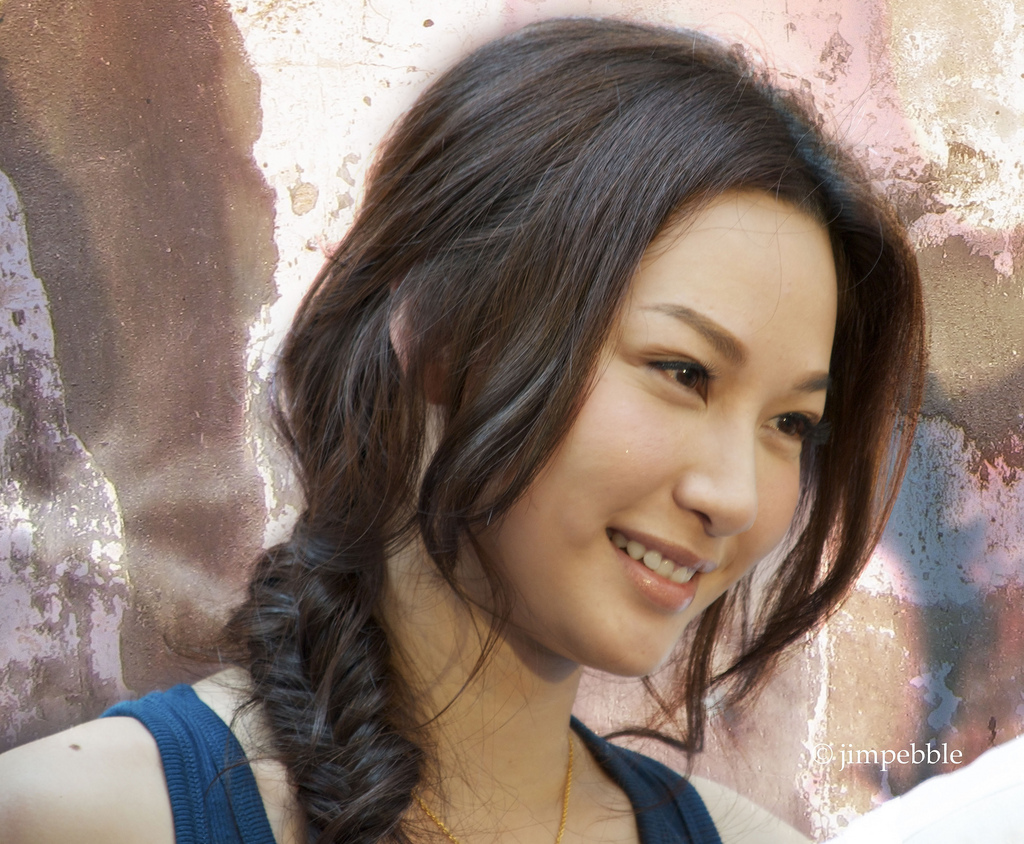
Kate Tsui won in 2007.

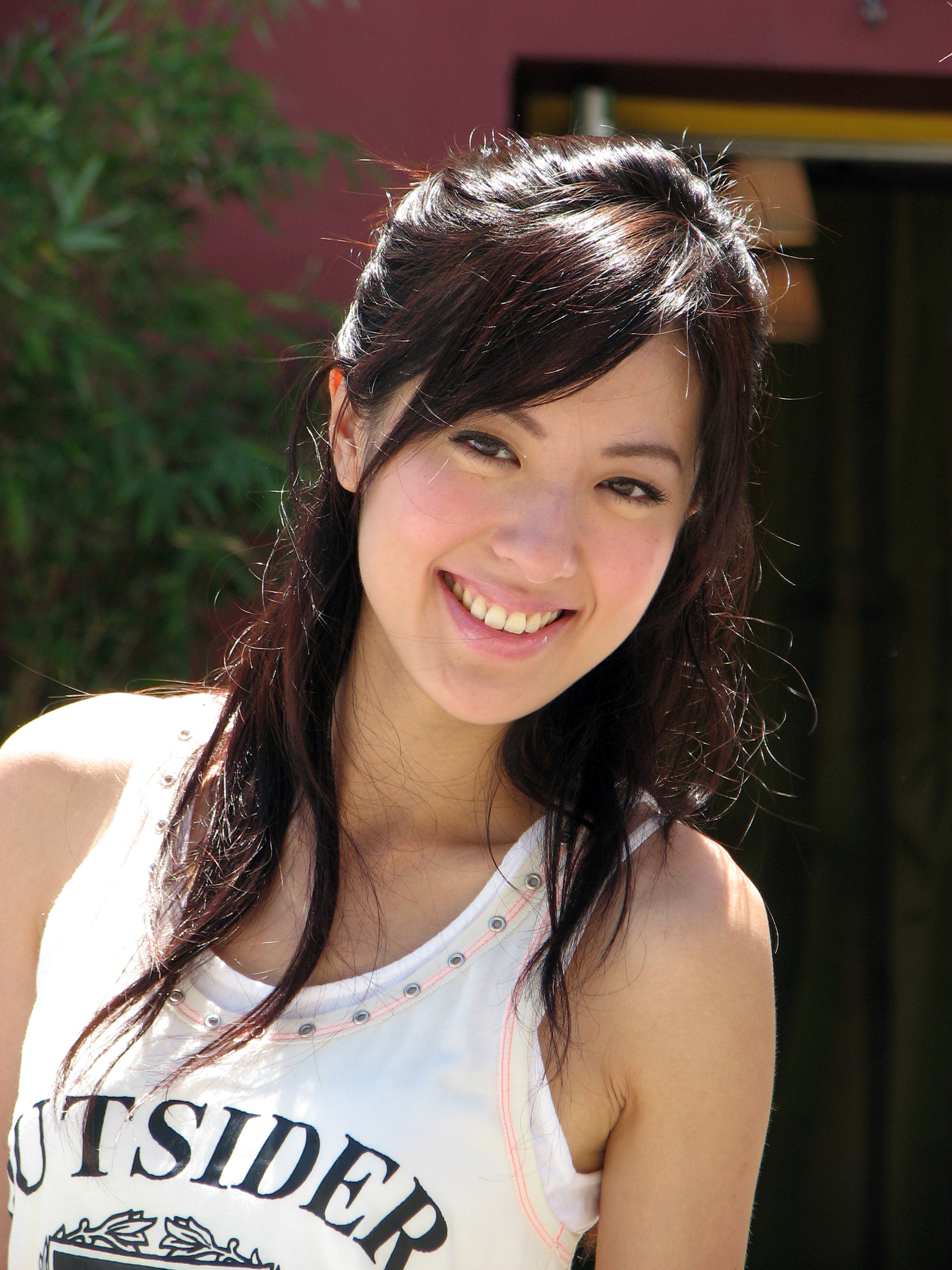
Natalie Tong won in 2010.

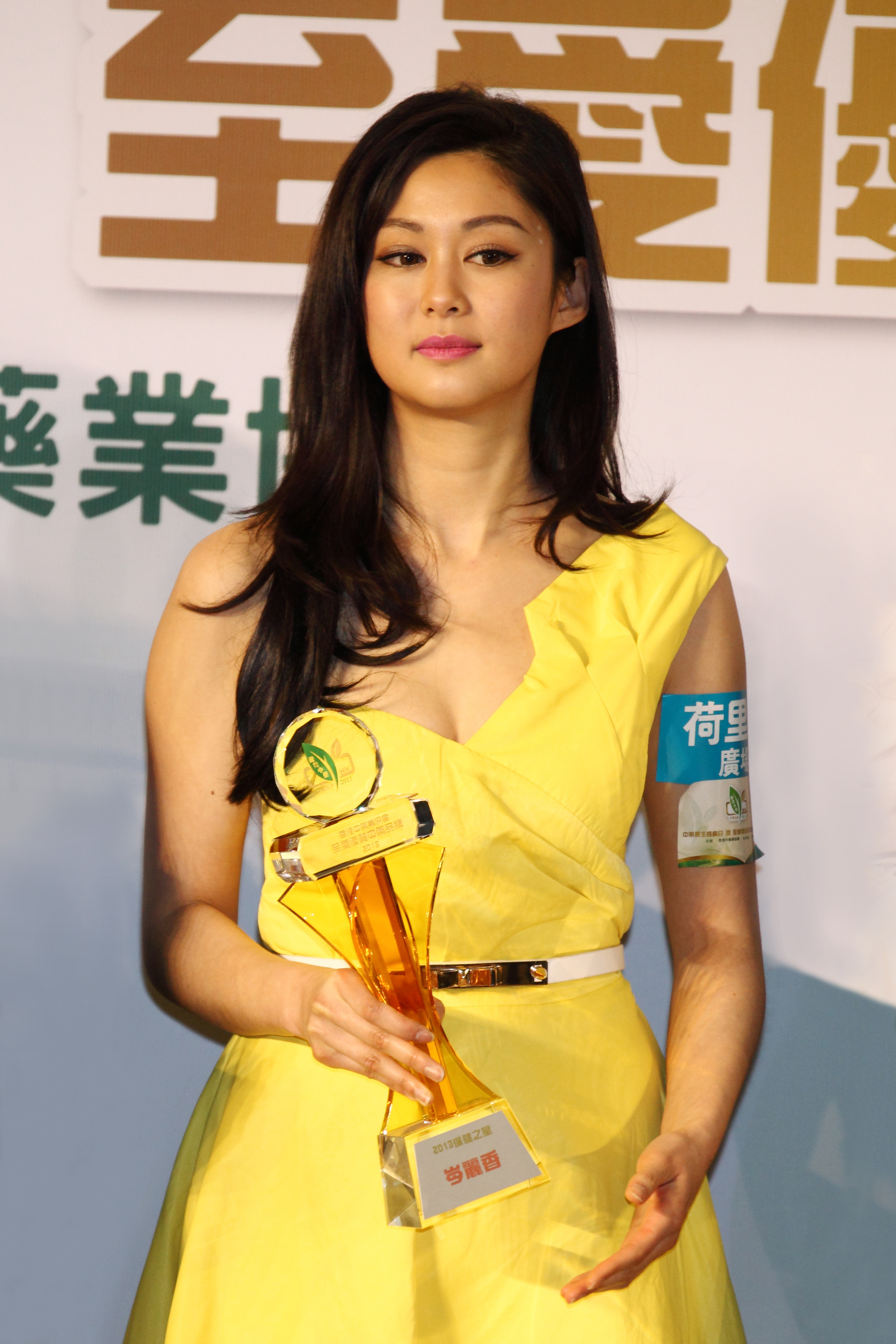
Eliza Sam won in 2013.

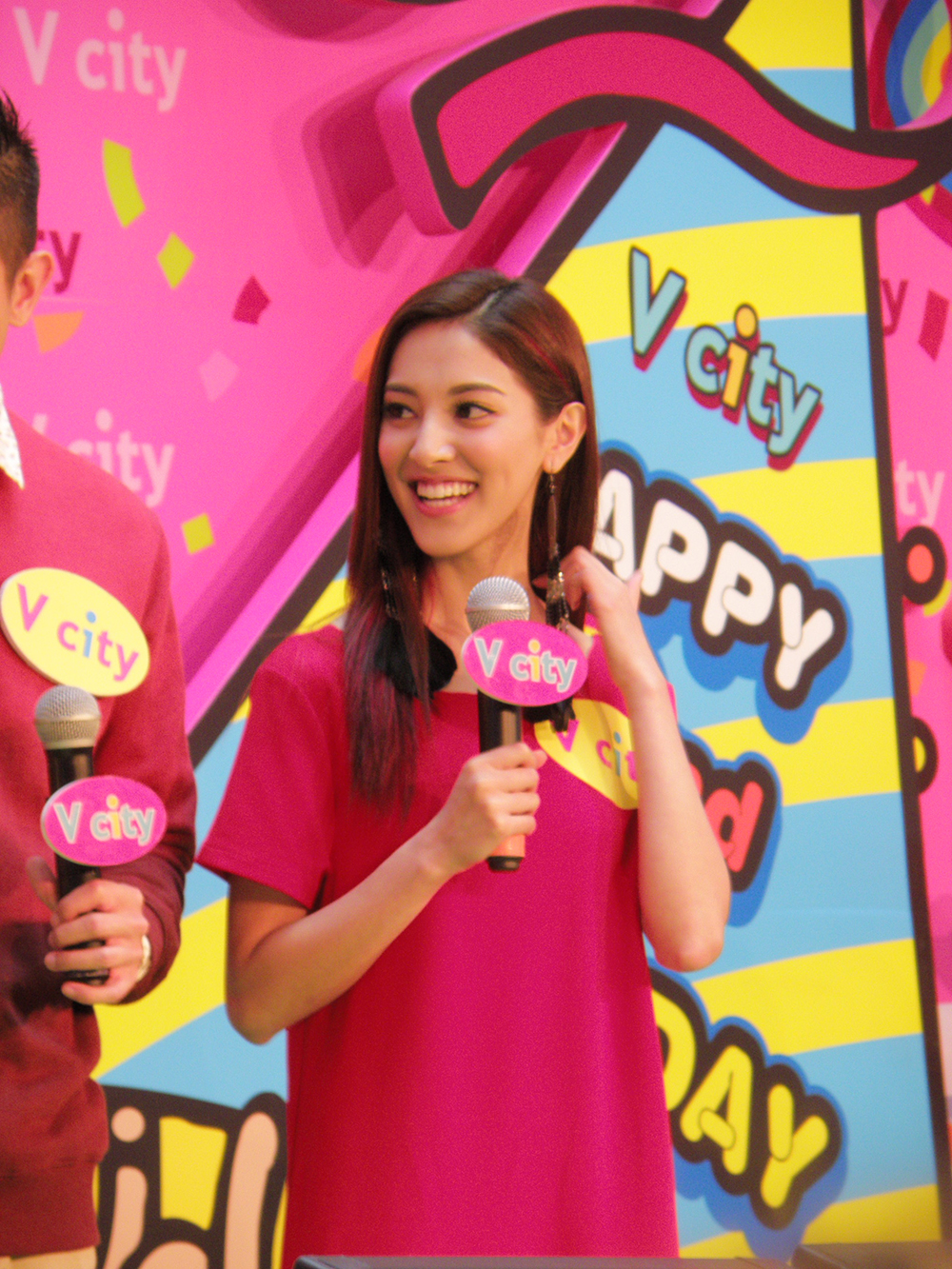
Grace Chan won in 2015.

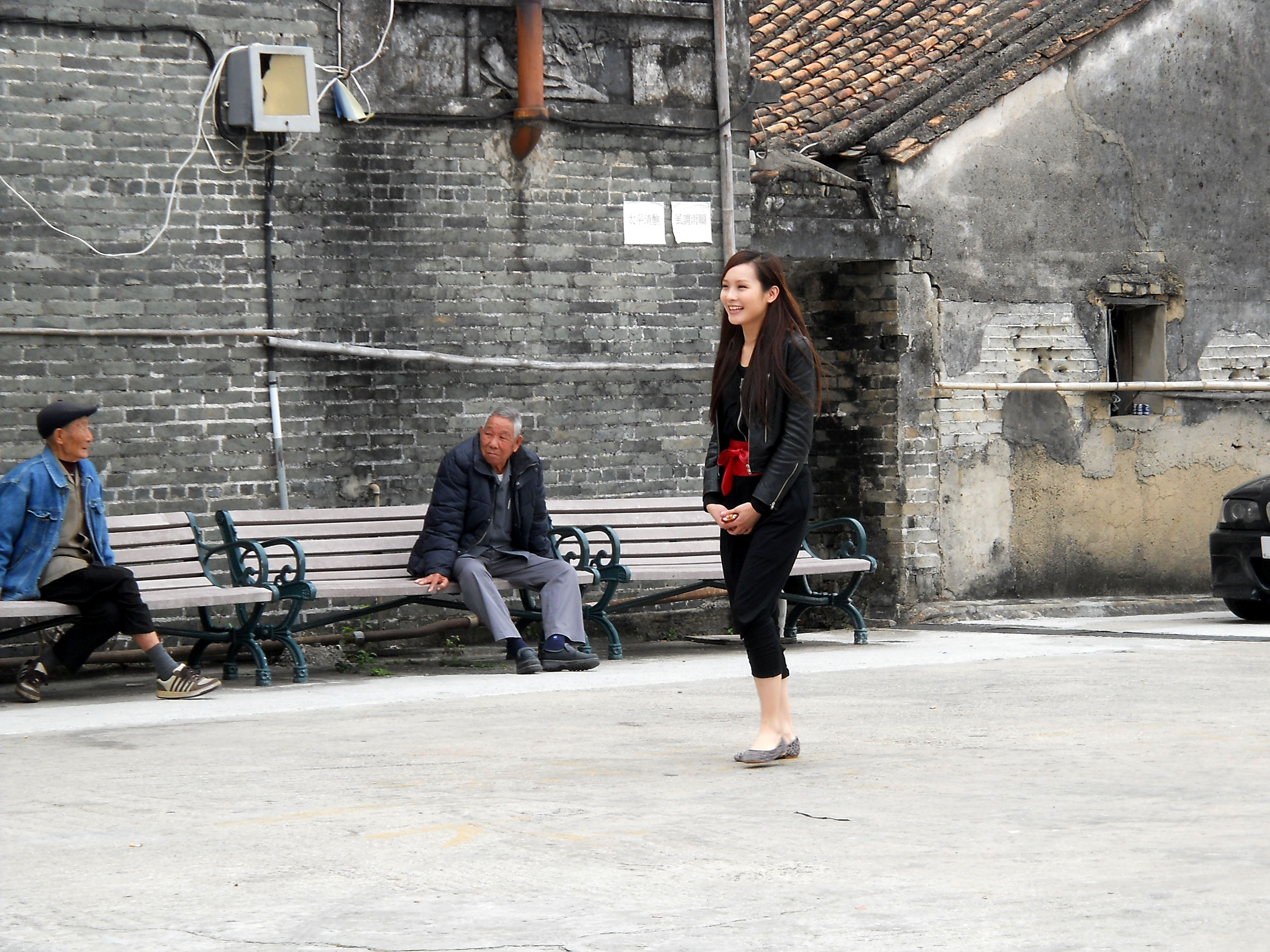
Ali Lee won in 2016.

=== 2000s ===
Year	Artiste	Work(s)
2002 (6th)	Myolie Wu †	Golden Faith
2003 (7th)	Tavia Yeung †	Vigilante Force
2004 (8th)	Shirley Yeung †	Angels of Mission
2005 (9th)	Niki Chow †	The Gentle Crackdown
2005 (9th)	Leila Tong	The Last Breakthrough
2005 (9th)	Bernice Liu	Love Bond
2005 (9th)	Tavia Yeung	The Prince's Shadow
2005 (9th)	Elaine Yiu	Revolving Doors of Vengeance
2006 (10th)	Linda Chung †	Always Ready, The Biter Bitten, and Forensic Heroes
2006 (10th)	Selena Li	The Herbalist's Manual and To Grow with Love
2006 (10th)	Tavia Yeung	A Pillow Case of Mystery' and Land of Wealth
2006 (10th)	Leila Tong	Bar Bender
2006 (10th)	Natalie Tong	Forensic Heroes, At Home with Love, and Under The Canopy Of Love
2007 (11th)	Kate Tsui †	On the First Beat, and Steps
2007 (11th)	Natalie Tong	Life Art, The Green Grass of Home, The Ultimate Crime Fighter, and Body Talks
2007 (11th)	Fala Chen	Heart of Greed, The Family Link, and Steps
2007 (11th)	Toby Leung	The Drive of Life
2007 (11th)	Bernice Liu	The Brink of Law, Devils' Disciples, and Steps
2008 (12th)	Nancy Wu †	Wars of In-Laws II, D.I.E., The Silver Chamber of Sorrows, Legend of the Demigods, and Strictly Come Dancing: Cycle 2
2008 (12th)	Selena Li	Survivor's Law II, The Master of Tai Chi, The Seventh Day, Forensic Heroes II, and The Four
2008 (12th)	Toby Leung	Marriage of Inconvenience and The Money-Maker Recipe
2008 (12th)	Sharon Chan	Word Twisters' Adventures, Catch Me Now, Forensic Heroes II, and Infolink2
2008 (12th)	Tavia Yeung	The Building Blocks of Life and Moonlight Resonance
2009 (13th)	Aimee Chan †	Off Pedder, E.U., and Burning Flame III
2009 (13th)	Queenie Chu	The Gem of Life, Off Pedder, and You're Hired
2009 (13th)	Koni Lui	You're Hired, Mystery, and National Heritage
2009 (13th)	Catherine Chau	The Gem of Life, The King of Snooker, and A Bride for a Ride
2009 (13th)	Sharon Chan	Pages of Treasures, Born Rich, and Community for the Chest Television Show

=== 2010s ===
Year	Artiste	Work(s)
2010 (14th)	Natalie Tong †	A Watchdog's Tale, A Fistful of Stances, and The Comeback Clan
2010 (14th)	Selena Li	A Fistful of Stances and Can't Buy Me Love
2010 (14th)	Elaine Yiu	In the Eye of the Beholder, Ghost Writer, and When Lanes Merge
2010 (14th)	Skye Chan	Scoop, Yan Chai Charity Show 2010, and Po Leung Kuk Gala Spectacular 2010
2010 (14th)	Mimi Lo	The Beauty of the Game, The Season of Fate, Don Juan DeMercado, My Better Half, and Jade Solid Gold
2011 (15th)	Sire Ma †	Eat This Way, Relic of an Emissary, River of Wine, Men with No Shadows, and Curse of the Royal Harem
2011 (15th)	Samantha Ko	Eat This Way, After Hours, Admiral's Feast, and Forensic Heroes III
2011 (15th)	Mandy Wong	Scoop, Home Troopers, Ghetto Justice, Lives of Omission, and Men with No Shadows
2011 (15th)	Cilla Kung	Yes, Sir. Sorry, Sir!, River of Wine, and Forensic Heroes III
2011 (15th)	Katy Kung	7 Days in Life, Ghetto Justice, Be Home for Dinner, and The Life and Times of a Sentinel
2012 (16th)	Mandy Wong †	L'Escarot, The Hippocratic Crush, Tiger Cubs, and Divas in Distress
2012 (16th)	Eliza Sam	Ghetto Justice II, Divas in Distress, and The Amur River
2012 (16th)	Christine Kuo	Ghetto Justice II and Tiger Cubs
2012 (16th)	Cilla Kung	Three Kingdoms RPG, Daddy Good Deeds, and Witness Insecurity
2012 (16th)	Katy Kung	Bottled Passion, Gloves Come Off, No Good Either Way, The Last Steep Ascent, and Living Up
2013 (17th)	Eliza Sam †	Inbound Troubles, Triumph in the Skies II, Friendly Fire, and The Hippocratic Crush II
2013 (17th)	Grace Wong	Friendly Fire, Sergeant Tabloid, Awfully Lawful, The Hippocratic Crush II, and Bounty Lady
2013 (17th)	Oceane Zhu	Come Home Love, Season of Love, Sergeant Tabloid, A Great Way to Care II, Slow Boat Home, A Change of Heart and Triumph in the Skies II
2013 (17th)	Cilla Kung	Missing You, The Day of Days, Karma Rider and Slow Boat Home
2013 (17th)	Priscilla Wong	Reality Check, Karma Rider, Pilgrimage of Wealth, Explore Hotels, and Pilgrimage of Wealth II
2014 (18th)	Priscilla Wong †	Return of the Silver Tongue, Swipe Tap Love, The Conquerors, Pilgrimage to Football Meccas, and Chef Minor
2014 (18th)	Rosina Lam	Outbound Love and Ghost Dragon of Cold Mountain
2014 (18th)	Samantha Ko	Come Home Love, Outbound Love, Line Walker and All That Is Bitter Is Sweet
2014 (18th)	Grace Chan	Organized Dining, Overachievers, Pok Oi Charity Show and TVB Anniversary Gala
2014 (18th)	Jacqueline Wong	The Ultimate Addiction, Tomorrow Is Another Day, Explore Japan - Rail & Drive and Sidewalk Scientist
2015 (19th)	Grace Chan †	Raising the Bar, Captain of Destiny, Organized Dining, 2015 TVB Most Popular TV Commercial Awards and 48th TVB Anniversary Gala
2015 (19th)	Tracy Chu	Smooth Talker and The Fixer
2015 (19th)	Rosina Lam	Young Charioteers, Eye In the Sky and Momentary Lapse of Reason
2015 (19th)	Ali Lee	Raising the Bar, My "Spiritual" Ex-Lover, Under the Veil, Organized Dining, Sidewalk Scientist and So Hong Kong
2015 (19th)	Jacqueline Wong	Smooth Talker, Limelight Years, With or Without You, Sidewalk Scientist and Caritas Charity Show 2015
2015 (19th)	Rebecca Zhu	Officer Geomancer, Smooth Talker and The Fixer
2016 (20th)	Ali Lee †	Fashion War, Brother's Keeper II, Law dis-Order, Sidewalk Scientist, Organized Dining and Anchors With Passport (series 2)
2016 (20th)	Tracy Chu	Speed of Life, K9 Cop and Over Run Over
2016 (20th)	Stephanie Ho	Love as a Predatory Affair, Blue Veins, Dead Wrong, Jade Solid Gold and I Heart HK
2016 (20th)	Mayanne Mak	Sidewalk Scientist, Anchors With Passport (series 2), A Starry Homecoming, Community Chest 2016, TVB Most Popular TV Commercial Awards 2016, I Heart HK, Sermon by Ben Sir and Peak to Pit
2016 (20th)	Moon Lau	Angel In-the-Making, Over Run Over, Blue Veins, House of Spirits, A Fist Within Four Walls, Two Steps from Heaven and 2016 Birth of Records 8
2016 (20th)	Katy Kung	The Executioner and Two Steps from Heaven
2017 (21st)	Mayanne Mak †	Miss Hong Kong 2017, Sammy On the Go, Line Walker The Hunting Game, TVB Anniversary Gala
2017 (21st)	Rebecca Zhu	Recipes to Live By, A General, a Scholar, and a Eunuch and Hong Kong Round the Clock
2017 (21st)	Samantha Ko	My Unfair Lady, Bet Hur, Sammy On the Go and Gag Gag Summer
2017 (21st)	Zoie Tam	May Fortune Smile On You, My Unfair Lady, Legal Mavericks and My Ages Apart
2017 (21st)	Roxanne Tong	Provocateur, My Dearly Sinful Mind, The Tofu War and Sidewalk Scientist
2017 (21st)	Jacqueline Wong	Provocateur, Nothing Special Force and Sammy On the Go
2018 (22nd)	Crystal Fung †	Apple-colada, Sidewalk Scientist, Young And Restless, Miss Hong Kong 2018
2018 (22nd)	Kelly Cheung	Life on the Line, Wife Interrupted, Fun Abroad, Dolce Vita, The Taxorcist Sidequel - Chapter One
2018 (22nd)	Louisa Mak	OMG, Your Honour, Young And Restless, big big channel, Miss Hong Kong 2018
2018 (22nd)	Gloria Tang	Another Era, The Taxorcist Sidequel - Chapter One, Organized Dining
2018 (22nd)	Roxanne Tong	Birth Of A Hero, Daddy Cool, Another Era
2019 (23nd)	Kelly Cheung †	Big White Duel, Barrack O'Karma,The Man Who Kills Troubles
2019 (23nd)	Roxanne Tong	My Commissioned Lover, Justice Bao：The First Year, Handmaidens United
2019 (23nd)	Kaman Kong	The Ghetto-Fabulous Lady, Mom on the Run
2019 (23nd)	Iris Lam	Come Home Love: Lo And Behold, My Commissioned Lover, Girlie Days
2019 (23nd)	Gloria Tang	The Defected, Barrack O'Karma, Organized Dining, 12 Summers, Inter Inter Intergen, Aged Not Old

=== 2020s ===
Year	Artiste	Work(s)
2020 (24th)	Angel Chiang †	Al Cappuccino, Hong Kong Love Stories, Legal Mavericks 2020, Play The World
2020 (24th)	Regina Ho	The Dripping Sauce, Airport Strikers, The Exorcist's 2nd Meter, Life After Death
2020 (24th)	Iris Lam	Come Home Love: Lo and Behold, Brutally Young, The Exorcist's 2nd Meter
2020 (24th)	Moon Lau	The Exorcist's 2nd Meter, Flying Tiger II
2020 (24th)	Gloria Tang	Airport Strikers, The Exorcist's 2nd Meter, Legal Mavericks 2020
2021 (25th)	Lesley Chiang †	Come Home Love: Lo And Behold, Kids' Lives Matter
2021 (25th)	Jeannie Chan	Beauty and the Boss, Shadow of Justice, Battle of the Seven Sisters
2021 (25th)	Joey Wong	Sinister Beings, Fraudstars, STARS Academy, First Live On Stage
2021 (25th)	Venus Wong	Murder Diary, The Line Watchers
2021 (25th)	Kayan Yau	Come Home Love: Lo And Behold, Murder Diary, Heart City Hong Kong, Prop Up Youth
2022 (26th)	Rosita Kwok †	Freedom Memories, Stranger Anniversary, Big White Duel 2, Get On A Flat
2022 (26th)	Tiffany Lau	The Righteous Fists, Freedom Memories, My Pride, I've Got The Power
2022 (26th)	Gigi Yim	Forever Young at Heart, Infinity and Beyond
2022 (26th)	Moon Lau	The Righteous Fists, The Beauty of War, I've Got The Power
2022 (26th)	Hera Chan	Used Good, Story of Zom-B, The Beauty of War, Forensic Heroes V
2023 (27th)	Tiffany Lau †	The Invisibles, Unchained Medley, Lokyi in The Wild
2023 (27th)	Kelly Fu	Night Beauties, From Hong Kong to Beijing
2023 (27th)	Roxanne Ho	Come Home Love: Lo and Behold, Treasure of Destiny, My Pet My Angel, The Queen of News, Scoop, Long Weekend Getaways, Listen to Your Body, Caritas Star Studded Charity Show, TVB Anniversary Gala Show
2023 (27th)	Regina Ho	Speakers of Law, From Hong Kong to Beijing, The Queen of News, When Science Meets Magic
2023 (27th)	Venus Wong	The Queen of News
2024 (28th)	Hera Chan †	No Return, Call of Destiny, From Shenzhen to Zhongshan
2024 (28th)	Celina Harto	Justice Sung Begins, No Return, Experiencing Endless Fun in Macau, Amazing Cut
2024 (28th)	Rachel Chan	Scoop, Tristar Academy, Tokushima Road Trip Ideas, TVB Anniversary Gala Show
2024 (28th)	Carmen Kwan	Sinister Beings 2, No Return, Tristar Academy
2024 (28th)	Joey Thye	The Airport Diary, Forensic Heroes VI, 2024 League of Legends World Championship
2025 (29th)	Sophie Yip †	Come Home Love: Lo and Behold, A Date With Goddess, Miss Hong Kong 2025, Call of Heroes Road to Victory Party Show
2025 (29th)	Celina Harto	The Queen of Castle, The Queen of News 2
2025 (29th)	Roxanne Ho	Scoop, Love in Go Park, Health Express, Embrace the National Games
2025 (29th)	Joey Thye	D.I.D. 12, A Day with a Pro, Paws of Love, Call of Heroes Road to Victory Party Show
2025 (29th)	Carman Kwan	Battle of Marriage, Heavenly Hand, A Date With Goddess

== Records ==
Most nominations

Nominations	Actress
5	Selena Li
4	Tavia Yeung
3
3	Natalie Tong
3	Cilla Kung
3	Katy Kung
3	Samantha Ko
3	Jacqueline Wong

Age superlatives

Record	Actress	Age
Oldest winner	Ali Lee	34 years
Oldest nominee	Mimi Lo	36 years
Youngest winner	Linda Chung	22 years, 215 days
Youngest nominee	Katy Kung	22 years, 0 days
