= List of TVB dramas in 2016 =

This is a list of television serial dramas released by TVB in 2016.

== Top ten drama series in ratings ==
The following is a list of TVB's top serial dramas in 2016 by average ratings. The list includes premiere week, final week, and the finale episode ratings, as well as the average overall count of live Hong Kong viewers (in millions).

Highest-rated drama series of 2016
Rank	English title	Chinese title	Average^{[A]}	Peak	Premiere week	Final week	Series finale	HK viewers (millions)
1	A Fist Within Four Walls	城寨英雄PG13 成人題材	30.7	35	27	31	33	1.99
2	Short End of the Stick	公公出宮PG13 成人題材	30.5	33	24	29	28	1.97
3	House of Spirits	一屋老友記PG13 成人題材	29.7	32	25	29	30	1.92
4	Speed of Life	鐵馬戰車PG13 成人題材	28.6	30	26	27	24	1.85
5	Love as a Predatory Affair	愛情食物鏈PG13 成人題材	28.1	31	26	27	25	1.82
6	K9 Cop	警犬巴打PG13 成人題材	27.2	31	24	26	27	1.76
7	Fashion War	潮流教主PG13 成人題材	26.9	28	24	25	27	1.74
8	Two Steps From Heaven	幕後玩家PG13 成人題材	26.3	28	23	25	26	1.70
9	My Dangerous Mafia Retirement Plan	火線下的江湖大佬PG13 成人題材	25.8	30	24	25	27	1.67
10	Over Run Over	EU超時任務PG13 成人題材	25.4	30	25	25	29	1.64

Notes

- A Average numbers are derived from consolidated ratings as reported by Nielsen and on TVB's annual report. A consolidated rating is defined as the summation of TV ratings, online live rating, and online catch-up rating.

== Awards ==
Category/Organization	StarHub TVB Awards 22 October 2016	TVB Star Awards Malaysia 26 November 2016	TVB Anniversary Awards 18 December 2016
Best Drama	A Fist Within Four Walls		
Best Actor	Ruco Chan; A Fist Within Four Walls; Wayne Lai; Short End of the Stick	Ruco Chan; A Fist Within Four Walls	
Best Actress	Nancy Wu; A Fist Within Four Walls		
Best Supporting Actor	Raymond Cho; Short End of the Stick	Mat Yeung; My Dangerous Mafia Retirement Plan	Raymond Cho; Short End of the Stick
Best Supporting Actress	Rosina Lam; Short End of the Stick	Joyce Tang; House of Spirits	Katy Kung; Two Steps from Heaven
Most Improved Actor	Mat Yeung; My Dangerous Mafia Retirement Plan and Brother's Keeper II	Jonathan Cheung; The Last Healer in Forbidden City, House of Spirits, and A Fist Within Four Walls	
Most Improved Actress	Ali Lee; Fashion War, Brother's Keeper II and Law dis-Order	Moon Lau; Angel In-the-Making, Over Run Over, Blue Veins, House of Spirits, A Fist Within Four Walls, and Two Steps from Heaven	Ali Lee; Fashion War, Brother's Keeper II and Law dis-Order
Best Theme Song	"Never Know You Are the Best" by Ruco Chan, Nancy Wu; A Fist Within Four Walls		
Most Popular On-Screen Couple or Partnership	Ruco Chan, Nancy Wu, Benjamin Yuen, and Grace Wong; A Fist Within Four Walls	Grace Wong and Benjamin Yuen; A Fist Within Four Walls	Tracy Chu and Vincent Wong; Over Run Over

== First line-up ==
These dramas air in Hong Kong from 8:00pm to 8:30pm, Monday to Friday on Jade.

Broadcast	English title (Chinese title)	Eps.	Cast and crew	Theme song(s)	Avg. rating	Genre	Ref.
(from 2015); 6 Jul– 1 Apr	Come Home Love (sr. 2) 愛·回家	191	Law Chun-ngok (producer); Siu Long, Tsui Dat-chor, Tong Kin-ping, Lo Mei-wan, Sin Chui-ching (writers); Louis Cheung, Priscilla Wong, Owen Cheung, Quinn Ho, James Ng, Katy Kung, Evergreen Mak, Lee Fung, Helen Ma	"愛同行" (Walk With Love) by Fred Cheng	22	Sitcom	
4 Apr– 6 Jan (to 2017)	Come Home Love: Dinner at 8 愛·回家之八時入席	200	Sandy Shaw, Law Chun-ngok (producers); Shaw, Choi Suk-yin, Sin Chui-ching, Ma Chun-ying (writers); Teresa Mo, Wayne Lai, Chung King-fai, Power Chan, Florence Kwok, Angela Tong, William Hu, Mark Ma, Veronica Shiu, Jessica Kan, Eric Li, Anthony Wong	"完美的生活" (Perfect Life) by Jinny Ng	TBA	Sitcom	

== Second line-up ==
These dramas air in Hong Kong from 8:30pm to 9:30pm, Monday to Friday on Jade.

Broadcast	English title (Chinese title)	Eps.	Cast and crew	Theme song(s)	Avg. rating	Genre	Ref.
(from 2015); 7 Dec– 10 Jan	The Executioner 刀下留人	26	Law Chun-ngok (producer); Sin Tsui-ching (writer); Kenny Wong, Maggie Shiu, Mat Yeung, Katy Kung, Elaine Yiu, Joel Chan, Bowie Wu, Hugo Ng, Stanley Cheung	"相信明天" (A Better Tomorrow) by Hubert Wu	23	Historical period drama	
11 Jan– 5 Feb	Love as a Predatory Affair 愛情食物鏈	21	Steven Tsui (producer); Lau Chi-wah, Yung Sin-ying (writers); Kitty Yuen, King Kong Lee, Jason Chan Chi-san, Samantha Ko, Stephanie Ho, Brian Tse, Timothy Cheng, Griselda Yeung	"愛情食物鏈" (Love Chain) by Stephanie Ho	27	Romantic comedy	
09 Feb– 27 Mar	Short End of the Stick 公公出宮	35	Marco Law (producer); Kwan Chung-ling (writer); Wayne Lai, Nancy Wu, Edwin Siu, Power Chan, Raymond Cho, David Chiang, Natalie Tong, Rosina Lam, Grace Wong, Rachel Kan, Yoyo Chen	"藍天白雲" (Blue Sky) by Sammy Sum	28	Period drama, Comedy	
28 Mar– 22 Apr	The Last Healer In Forbidden City 末代御醫	20	Nelson Cheung (producer); Wong Kwok-fai (writer); Roger Kwok, Tavia Yeung, Law Lan, Pierre Ngo, JJ Jia, Jonathan Cheung, Rebecca Zhu, Lam Tsz-sin	"靈魂的痛" (Agony) by Hubert Wu	23	Historical period medical drama	
25 Apr– 27 May	My Dangerous Mafia Retirement Plan 火線下的江湖大佬	25	Leung Choi-yuen (producer); Ng Lap-kwong (writer); Kent Cheng, Alice Chan, Eliza Sam, Mat Yeung, Tommy Wong, Kingdom Yuen, Joel Chan	"火線下" (Line of Fire) by Fred Cheng	24	Comedy	
30 May– 3 Jul	Presumed Accidents 純熟意外	28	Andy Chan (producer); Lam Lai-mei (writer); Lawrence Ng, Sisley Choi, Selena Li, Lai Lok-yi, Raymond Cho, Joyce Tang, Snow Suen	"命運的意外" (Unexpected Fate) by Hubert Wu	23	Crime, Suspense	
4 Jul– 29 Jul	Between Love & Desire 完美叛侶	20	Au Yiu-hing (producer); Lam Chung-bong (writer); Moses Chan, Maggie Shiu, Ben Wong, Rachel Kan, Roxanne Tong, Brian Chu	"最後一次分手" (The Last Breakup) by Jinny Ng	23	Romantic drama	
1 Aug– 26 Aug	Daddy Dearest 超能老豆	20	Poon Ka-tak (producer); Lo Mei-wan (writer); Johnson Lee, Jason Chan Chi-san, Mandy Wong, Candice Chiu, Alice Chan, Jerry Ku	"爸爸" (Daddy) by Hubert Wu	23	Family drama	
29 Aug– 21 Oct	Brother's Keeper II 巨輪II	39	Amy Wong (producer); Cheng Sing-mo (writer); Edwin Siu, Kristal Tin, Grace Chan, Louis Yuen, Steven Cheung, Hugo Ng, Jade Leung, Mat Yeung, Tsui Wing, Ali Lee, Ruco Chan, Linda Chung, Jess Sum	"誰可改變" (No One Can Change) by Ruco Chan	23	Drama	
24 Oct– 9 Dec	Two Steps from Heaven 幕後玩家	35	Joe Chan (producer); Kwan Chung-ling, Cheng Sing-mo (writers); Bosco Wong, Edwin Siu, Louis Cheung, Priscilla Wong, Katy Kung, Alice Chan, 6-Wing, Moon Lau	"造王" (King) by Hubert Wu	24	Drama	
12 Dec– 1 Jan (to 2017)	Rogue Emperor 流氓皇帝	17	Poon Ka-tak (producer); Chan Kam-ling (writer); Kenneth Ma, Niki Chow, Benjamin Yuen, Mandy Wong, Brian Tse, Jerry Ku, Harriet Yeung, 6-Wing	"四方" (Four Sides) by Hoffman Cheng "心暖" (Heart Warm) by Kenneth Ma, Niki Chow "乾杯" (Cheers) by Hoffman Cheng, Ronald Law, Yao Bin	21	Period drama, Romantic comedy	

== Third line-up ==
These dramas air in Hong Kong from 9:30pm to 10:30pm, Monday to Sunday on Jade.

Background shading indicates dramas not produced by TVB.

Broadcast	English title (Chinese title)	Eps.	Cast and crew	Theme song(s)	Avg. rating	Genre	Ref.
(from 2015); 28 Dec– 17 Jan	Wu Xin: The Monster Killer 無心法師	20	Karen Tsai (producer); Lin Yufen, Gao Linpao (directors); Elvis Han, Gina Jin, Sebrina Chen, Zhang Ruoyun, Mike, Ian Wang	"記住忘記我" (Remember To Forget Me) by Alfred Hui	22	Period drama, Fantasy	
18 Jan– 6 Feb	Speed of Life 鐵馬戰車	20	Andy Chan (producer); Shek Hoi-ting, Tsui Dat-chor, Cheng Sing-mo (writers); Kenny Wong, Benjamin Yuen, Natalie Tong, Sisley Choi, Pat Poon, Carlo Ng, Rachel Kan, Raymond Cho, Pierre Ngo, Jack Wu, KK Cheung	"同步" (Same Pace) by Justin Lo	27	Police procedural	
09 Feb– 28 Feb	K9 Cop 警犬巴打	20	Wong Wai-sing (producer); Chan Kam-ling (writer); Bosco Wong, Linda Chung, Raymond Wong Ho-yin, Tracy Chu, Oscar Leung, Angel Chiang, Rebecca Chan, Jerry Ku, Kayi Cheung	"你懂我" (You Understand Me) by Linda Chung "聽海" (Listen to the Sea) by Vivian Koo	26	Police comedy	
29 Feb– 20 Mar	Fashion War 潮流教主	20	Dave Fong (producer); Wong Wai-keung (writer); Moses Chan, Him Law, Sisley Choi, Ali Lee, Roxanne Tong, Joel Chan, Vivien Yeo, Koni Lui, Jeannie Chan, Hanjin Tan, Leanne Li	"潮流" (Trend) by Damon Chui	24	Drama	
21 Mar– 10 Apr	Over Run Over; EU超時任務	22	Lam Chi-wah (producer); Ng Lap-kwong (writer); Vincent Wong, Tracy Chu, Benjamin Yuen, Zoie Tam, Moon Lau, Pal Sinn, Christine Kuo, Rebecca Zhu	"最真心一對" (True Lovers) by Stephanie Ho	25	Sci-fi, Thriller	
11 Apr– 15 May	Blue Veins 殭	33	Joe Chan (producer); Yip Tin-shing, Lo Mei-wan Chan Po-yin (writers); Kevin Cheng, Kay Tse, Grace Chan, Wong You-nam, Anjaylia Chan, 6-Wing, Winki Lai, Joel Chan, Eddie Kwan, Dickson Yu	"諸神混亂" (Immortal Chaos) by Kay Tse "天地不容" (Intolerance) by Hubert Wu "The Only One" by Stephanie Ho	22	Fantasy	
16 May– 26 June	Nirvana in Fire 瑯琊榜	47	Hou Hongliang (producer); Kong Sheng, Li Xue (directors); Hai Yan (writer); Hu Ge, Wang Kai, Liu Tao, Victor Huang, Chen Long, Leo Wu	"問天" (God Knows) by Alfred Hui "可以背負更多" (Suffering) by Jinny Ng	18	Historical period political drama, Wuxia	
27 June– 31 Jul	House of Spirits 一屋老友記	31	Dave Fong (producer); Ma Chun-wing (writer); Bobby Au-yeung, Nancy Wu, Joyce Tang, Jonathan Cheung, Koni Lui, Bob Cheung, Bowie Wu, Helena Law, Lau Kong	"愛的溫暖" (The Warmth of Love) by Edwin Siu	27	Comedy, Supernatural, Family	
1 Aug– 28 Aug	A Fist Within Four Walls 城寨英雄	28	Jazz Boon (producer); Yip Tin-shing, Steffie Lai (writers); Ruco Chan, Nancy Wu, Benjamin Yuen, Carlo Ng, Philip Ng, Yuen Qiu, Lam Tsz-sin, Grace Wong, Moon Lau	"圍城" (Siege) by Ruco Chan "從未知道你最好" (Never Know You Are the Best) by Ruco Chan, Nancy Wu	27	Period drama, Martial arts, Action	
29 Aug– 18 Sep	Inspector Gourmet 為食神探	20	Leung Choi-yuen (producer); Ng Siu-tung (writer); Kenneth Ma, Louis Yuen, Priscilla Wong, Eliza Sam, Oscar Leung, Jacqueline Wong, Elvina Kong, Eric Li, Joe Junior	"誘心人" (Enticing) by Jinny Ng "我記不起" (I Can't Remember) by Linda Chung	22	Detective comedy	
19 Sep– 16 Oct	Law dis-Order 律政強人	28	Marco Law (producer); Wong Wai-keung (writer); Alex Fong Chung-shun, Liu Kai-chi, Ali Lee, Mandy Wong, Raymond Cho, Florence Kwok, Matthew Ho, Chung King-fai, Griselda Yeung, Ram Chiang	"公義的抉擇" (Choice of Justice) by Hubert Wu "Can You See" by Kayee Tam	23	Legal drama	
17 Oct– 18 Nov	My Lover From the Planet Meow 來自喵喵星的妳	32	Steven Tsui (producer); Lam Siu-chi, Yung Sin-ying (writers); Moses Chan, Kristal Tin, Nancy Wu, Eddie Kwan, Vivien Yeo, Ram Chiang, Pierre Ngo	"喵喵" (Meow Meow) by Alvin Ng, Auston Lam, Penny Chan (feat. C-Kwan, Moses Chan) "得寵" (Pamper) by Kristal Tin, Nancy Wu	21	Romantic comedy	
20 Nov– 17 Dec	Dead Wrong 致命復活	28	Lam Chi-wah (producer); Ng Siu-tung (writer); Roger Kwok, Joey Meng, Kenny Wong, Vincent Wong, Rebecca Zhu, Stephanie Ho, Zoie Tam, KK Cheung	"不可告人" (Cannot Be Told) by Vincent Wong "愛需要勇氣" (Love Takes Courage) by Stephanie Ho	22	Drama, Suspense	
19 Dec– 14 Jan (to 2017)	No Reserve 巾幗梟雄之諜血長天	26	Lee Tim-sing (producer); Ip Kwong-yam (writer); Wayne Lai, Myolie Wu, Edwin Siu, Sire Ma, Yoyo Chen, Susan Tse, Lee Shing-cheong, Lau Kong, Helena Law, Cecilia Fong, Eric Li, King Kong Lee	"孤嶺花" (Solitary Flower) by Kay Tse	20	Period drama, Thriller	

== Weekend dramas ==
These dramas air in Hong Kong every Saturday or Sunday night from 8:00pm to 9:00pm on Jade.

Broadcast	English title (Chinese title)	Eps.	Cast and crew	Theme song(s)	Avg. rating	Genre	Ref.
16 Apr– 21 May	ICAC Investigators 2016 廉政行動2016	5	Catherine Tsang, Raymond Ng, Anita Law (producers); Herman Yau (director); Kenneth Ma, Natalie Tong, Ruco Chan, Lai Lok-yi, Kevin Tong, Arnold Kwok, Karmen Kwok, Kelly Fu, Daniel Chau Wilson Yun	"ICAC Investigators Theme"	17.4	Police procedural	

== myTV SUPER original programs ==
The following are original programs distributed by myTV SUPER, a video on demand streaming media service developed and operated by TVB. The service also offers exclusive distribution of non-TVB programs in Hong Kong.

=== Drama ===
English title (Traditional Chinese title)	Genre	Language	Eps.	Premiere	Studio	Notes	Ref.
Come with Me 性在有情	Romantic comedy	Cantonese	20	4 June 2016	TVB	5 episodes released every Saturday	
The Hiddens 隱世者們	Crime, Action-thriller	Cantonese	20	22 September 2016	Gary Tang Productions		
No Reserve 巾幗梟雄之諜血長天	Period drama, Thriller	Cantonese	30	1 October 2016	TVB	4 episodes released every Saturday; 5 episodes released on first and last Saturday	

=== Film ===
English title (Traditional Chinese title)	Genre	Language	Studio	Release	Ref.
A Time of Love II 愛情來的時候2	Romance	Cantonese	TVB	Part 1: 28 May 2016; Part 2: 4 June 2016	

== Notes ==
- Rogue Emperor 流氓皇帝; Copyright notice: 2015.
