= Nathan Ngai =

Hong Kong actor

- Born: Nathan Ngai; 3 April 1989 (age 36); Hong Kong, China
- Occupation: Actor
- Years active: 2009–present

Chinese name
- Traditional Chinese: 魏焌皓
- Simplified Chinese: 魏焌皓
Transcriptions

Nathan Ngai (Chinese: 魏焌皓; born 3 April 1989) is a Hong Kong actor.

== Early career ==
- Ngai graduated in TVB's graduating acting class of 2009.
- Ngai is best known for his role Cheung Yat Hong in the drama The Hippocratic Crush on 2012

=== TV series ===
Year	Title	Role	Additional Notes
2009	Off Pedder	Reporter (Episode 199), Handsome guy (Episode 225), Secretary (Episode 231 & 277)	minor role
2009	Beyond the Realm of Conscience	Shence Army	minor role
2010	My Better Half	Guest (Episode 14)	minor role
2010	OL Supreme	Guest (Episode 22)	minor role
2010	A Fistful of Stances	Student	minor role
2010	Sisters Of Pearl	Guest	minor role
2010	The Mysteries of Love	Police Officer (Episode 2)	minor role
2010	Some Day	Repairer, Guest	minor role
2010	When Lanes Merge	Gong	minor role
2010	Can't Buy Me Love	Kam	minor role
2010	The Comeback Clan	Barrister Wong (Episode 16)	minor role
2010	Gun Metal Grey	Police Officer	minor role
2010	Show Me the Happy	Sono (Episode 21)	minor role
2010	Links to Temptation	Barrister Lee's Assistant (Episode 17, 18)	minor role
2010	Home Troopers	Hired Worker (Episode 1)	minor role
2011	Grace Under Fire	Wong fei-Hung's Student	minor role
2011	Be Home for Dinner	Thief (Episode 89)	minor role
2011	Relic of an Emissary	Hungry People (Episode 23)	minor role
2011	Yes, Sir. Sorry, Sir!	Wong Kei Wun	minor role
2011	My Sister of Eternal Flower	Waiter	minor role
2011	Ghetto Justice	Computer Store Salesman (Episode 1)	minor role
2011	The Other Truth	CSD Worker	minor role
2011	Lives of Omission	HIT Team Worker (Episode 2)	minor role
2011	Men with No Shadows	Patient (Episode 18)	minor role
2011	Super Snoops	Chun	minor role
2011	Forensic Heroes III	Chu Pak Yun	minor role
2011	Til Love Do Us Lie	Kong Chi Shing (Perry)	supporting role
2011	When Heaven Burns	Bowman's Friend (Episode 1)	minor role
2012	L'Escargot	Triad (Episode 12), Bellboy (Episode 17)	minor role
2012	Let It Be Love	Police Officer (Episode 11, 17, 20)	minor role
2012	The Hippocratic Crush	Cheung Yat Hong	supporting role
2012	House of Harmony and Vengeance	Guard	minor role
2012	Come Home Love	Will (Episode 287), Hong Gan Shek (Episode 354)	guest star
2012	Master of Play	Artist (Episode 2)	minor role
2012	Tiger Cubs	Chiang Sai Chak	guest star
2012	Three Kingdoms RPG	Pianist (Episode 9, 20)	minor role
2012	King Maker	Yu Jing's Friend	minor role
2013	Season of Love	Chiang Siu Hung (Ginger Beer)	guest star
2013	A Great Way To Care II	Young Ko Lap Yan	guest star
2013	Sniper Standoff	Lam Pak Wing	supporting role
2013	The Hippocratic Crush II	Cheung Yat Hong	guest star
2014	Queen Divas	Cheung Hok Ken	minor role
2014	Ruse of Engagement	Gangster (Episode 1)	minor role
2014	ICAC Investigators 2014	Chow Yiu Man (Episode 2, 3)	guest star
2014	Ghost Dragon of Cold Mountain	Prince Ko (Episode 2)	guest star
2014	All That Is Bitter Is Sweet	Triad (Episode 19, 21)	minor role
2014	Tomorrow Is Another Day	Ho Kwok Wai	supporting role
2014	Tiger Cubs II	Captain	guest star
2014	Lady Sour	Ying Ming	supporting role
2015	Young Charioteers	Lau Lo	supporting role
2015	Smooth Talker	Wong Chu Liang	supporting role
2015	Come Home Love 2	Lo Chung Tak (Henry)	supporting role
2015	The Fixer	Lo Gai	supporting role
2017	Line Walker: The Prelude	Ben Sir	supporting role
TBA	Come With Me		supporting role

== Movies ==
Year	Title	Role
2010	72 Tenants of Prosperity	Walking Person
2011	I Love Hong Kong	Food and Environmental Hygiene Department Staff

== Personal life ==
He played the viola in high school, but dropped out of the orchestra after a string of poor performances.
