= Tracy Chu =

Hong Kong-born Canadian actress, television presenter and barrister (born 1988)

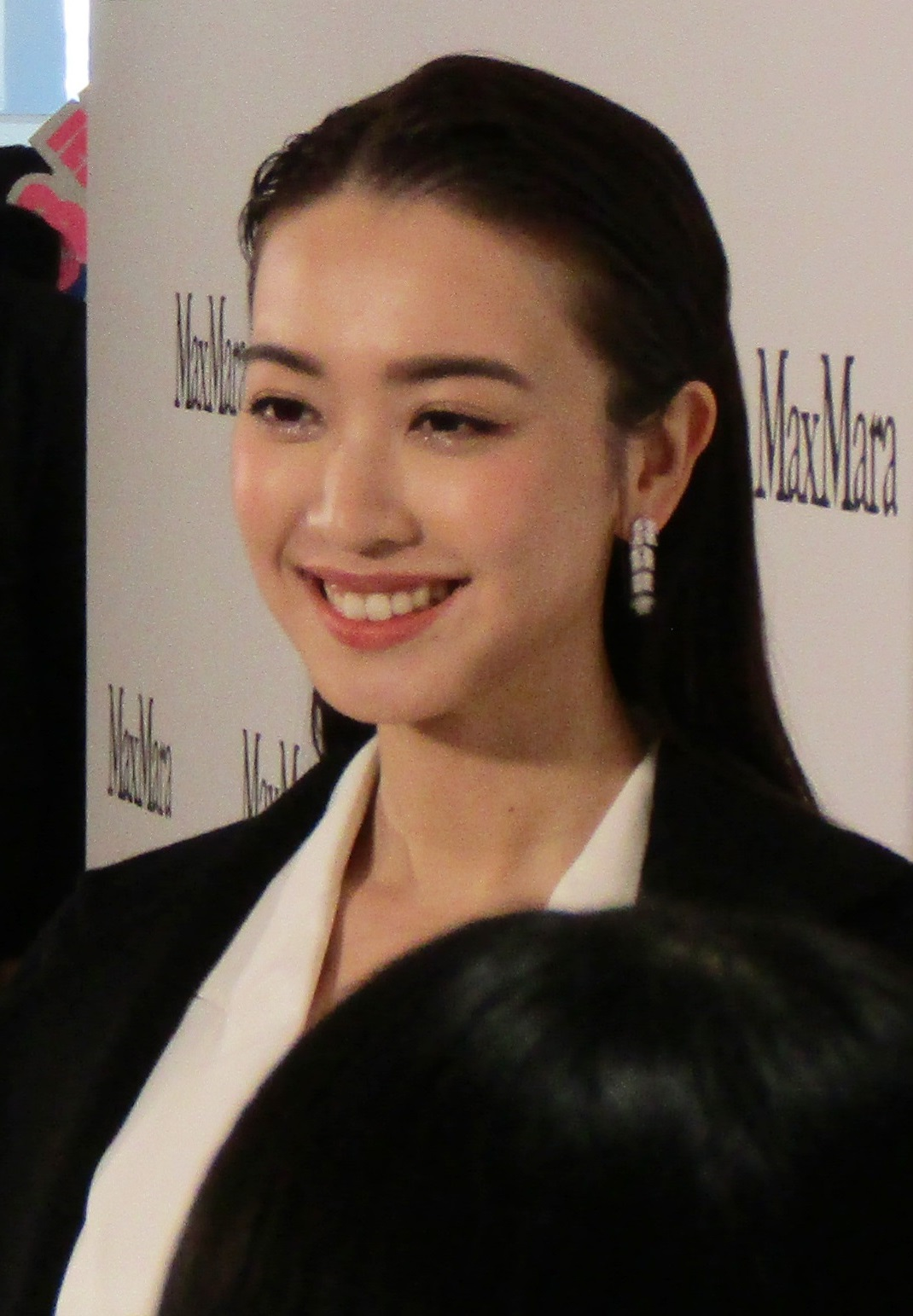
- Chu in Harbour City（October, 2021）
- Born: 28 June 1988 (age 38); British Hong Kong
- Occupations: Actress; Television Presenter; Barrister
- Years active: 2012–present
- Notable work: Over Run Over; Legal Mavericks
- Spouse: Justin Ng (m. 2019)
- Children: 1
- Awards: Full list

Chinese name
- Traditional Chinese: 朱千雪
Transcriptions
Standard Mandarin
- Hanyu Pinyin: Zhū Qiānxuě
Yue: Cantonese
- Jyutping: Zyu1 Cin1 Syut3
- Website: TVB artiste page

Tracy Chu Tsin-suet (born 28 June 1988) is a Hong Kong-born Canadian actress, television presenter and barrister.

Chu debuted in the entertainment industry through the Miss Hong Kong Pageant in 2012. In 2015, she won the Most Improved TVB Artiste awards at both the TVB Star Awards Malaysia and StarHub TVB Awards. In 2016, she played her first female leading role in the drama Over Run Over.

In September 2020, Chu officially became a barrister at Denis Chang's Chambers.

== Background ==
Tracy Chu was born on 28 June 1988 in Hong Kong. She is the eldest of three girls. At the age of 8, Chu and her family immigrated to Vancouver, British Columbia, Canada. During the first few years, she found it difficult to adjust to the new environment since she spoke minimal English.

Chu graduated from Simon Fraser University, majoring in Business and Communication. She also has an 8th grade in piano. Upon graduation, Chu returned to Hong Kong alone and worked as an administrative assistant for 2 years before deciding to join the Miss Hong Kong pageant.

== Career ==
=== Pageant career (2012) ===
Chu entered the 2012 Miss Hong Kong pageant as contestant #4. Despite being a fan favorites and many TVB artistes, including previous winners Samantha Ko, Suki Chui and TVB's executive officer Virginia Lok, Chu did not win the title, partly due to technical difficulties in the voting system.

The 2012 pageant was the first Miss Hong Kong pageant to hold viewers choice online voting. The winner was to be selected based on popular online votes by audiences. Chu placed 2nd Runner-up but many netizens and fellow TVB artistes felt Chu was robbed of the winning title mainly due to Chu was leading in online votes by 65% the day before the final event was held. Over 500 Hong Kong citizens filed a complaint against TVB with the Office of the Telecommunications Authority (OFTA) citing fraud was committed, when the winner was eventually decided by the judging panel.

TVB Deputy Director of External Affairs Tsang Sing-ming, later apologized to the press for TVB's computer servers being disrupted, resulting in a lot of viewers unable to vote for their favorite. He also commented that the winner had already been decided and that a recount would not be done.

=== Acting career (2013–2017) ===
After winning the Miss Hong Kong 2nd Runner-up title in 2012, Chu was cast for her first role in the medical drama The Hippocratic Crush II, acting opposite veteran Hong Kong actor Lawrence Ng. Her next drama, Tomorrow Is Another Day, had her starring opposite veteran actor Kenny Wong. Chu garnered multiple award nominations with this drama. In 2015, she earned positive reviews for her performance in the dramas Smooth Talker and The Fixer, both of which garnered her the Favourite Most Improved TVB Artiste awards at both the TVB Star Awards Malaysia and the StarHub TVB Awards.

In 2015, with the departure of longtime TVB lead actresses Myolie Wu and Kate Tsui, Chu got her first female leading role in the 2016 drama Over Run Over, again earning positive comments. Her onscreen partnership with Vincent Wong was well received, for which they won the Most Popular Onscreen Partnership award at the 2016 TVB Anniversary Awards. In addition, Chu earned her first nominations for both the Best Actress award and Most Popular Female Character award, eventually being placed among top 5 in both categories.

In 2017, Chu starred in the drama Legal Mavericks. With her role in this drama, she was placed among top 5 for the Best Supporting Actress at the 2017 TVB Anniversary Awards.

== Personal life ==
During a break from acting in September 2015, Chu enrolled full-time at The Chinese University of Hong Kong to pursue a master's degree in Corporate Communication. In September 2016, she enrolled at City University of Hong Kong School of Law to pursue a Juris Doctor degree. In September 2020, Chu became a barrister under Denis Chang’s Chamber.

By a media report on 28 June 2019, Chu confirmed that she was engaged and had lodged a Notice of Intention to marry her 5-year doctor boyfriend, Justin Ng. Their wedding party was held in Bali in August 2019. On 18 May 2024, Chu announced via Instagram that she had given birth to a son.

== Filmography ==
=== Television dramas ===
Year	Title	Chinese title	Role	Notes
2013	The Hippocratic Crush II	On Call 36小時II	Dr. Heung Chin-yi	Major Supporting Role
2014	Tomorrow Is Another Day	再戰明天	Chi Chun-kwong	Major Supporting Role
2015	Smooth Talker	以和為貴	Mo Sui-ka	Major Supporting Role; StarHub TVB Award for Most Improved TVB Artiste; TVB Star Award Malaysia for Favourite Most Improved TVB Female Artiste
2015	The Fixer	拆局專家	"Duck Duck" Mak Ping-on	Supporting Role; StarHub TVB Awards for Most Improved TVB Artiste; TVB Star Awards Malaysia for Favourite Most Improved TVB Female Artiste
2016	Speed of Life	鐵馬戰車	WPC Cheung Ching-ching	Guest Appearance
2016	K9 Cop	警犬巴打	Jil Lai Suk-chi	Major Supporting Role
2016	Over Run Over	EU超時任務	WSGT Ling Sun-fung	Main Role; StarHub TVB Award for My Favourite TVB Female TV Characters; TVB Star Award Malaysia for Favourite TVB Onscreen Couple (with Vincent Wong); TVB Anniversary Award for Most Popular Onscreen Partnership (with Wong)
2016–17	Rogue Emperor	流氓皇帝	Fung Siu-yung	Guest Appearance
2017	Legal Mavericks	踩過界	Yanice Tai Tin-yan	Supporting Role; StarHub TVB Award for My Favourite TVB Female TV Characters
2020	The Exorcist’s 2nd Meter	降魔的2.0	Taxi passenger	Guest Appearance in Ep. 5
2020	Legal Mavericks 2020	踩過界II	Yanice Tai Tin-yan	Guest Appearance (Voice only)

=== Films ===
Title	Chinese title	Year	Role	Notes
Helios	赤道	2015	Tracy	Guest Appearance

=== Television Host ===
Year	English Title	Chinese Title	Notes
2012	TVB Sales Presentation 2013	2013無綫節目巡禮	with Wayne Lai, Carat Cheung, Jacqueline Wong
2012	CASH	CASH流行曲創作大賽	with Eric Leung
2012	A Tasmanian Affair	塔斯曼尼亞的日與夜	with Jason Chan Chi-san
2012-2013	Jade Solid Gold	勁歌金曲	with Amigo Choi
2013	Tailor-made Tour	度身訂造旅行團	with King Kong Lee. Alan Tam, Chrissie Chau
2014	Dolce Vita	港優遊，港享受	with Yao Bin

== Awards and nominations ==
=== Miss Hong Kong 2012 ===
Year	Award	Result
2012	Miss Hong Kong 2nd Runner-up	Won

=== TVB Anniversary Awards ===
Year	Nominee / work	Award	Result
2015	The Fixer	Best Supporting Actress	Nominated
2015	The Fixer	Most Improved Female Artiste	Nominated
2016	Over Run Over	Best Actress	Nominated (Top 5)
2016	Over Run Over	Most Popular Female Character	Nominated (Top 5)
2016	Over Run Over	Most Popular Onscreen Partnership	Won
2016	Over Run Over	Most Improved Female Artiste	Nominated
2016	Speed of Life	Most Improved Female Artiste	Nominated
2016	K9 Cop	Most Improved Female Artiste	Nominated
2017	Legal Mavericks	Best Supporting Actress	Nominated (Top 5)
2017	Legal Mavericks	Most Popular Female Character	Nominated

=== TVB Star Awards Malaysia ===
Year	Nominee / work	Award	Result
2014	Tomorrow is Another Day	Favourite Most Improved TVB Female Artiste	Nominated
2015	Smooth Talker, The Fixer	Favourite Most Improved TVB Female Artiste	Won
2015	The Fixer	Favourite TVB Supporting Actress	Nominated
2016	Over Run Over	Favourite TVB Actress	Nominated (Top 5)
2016	Over Run Over	Favourite TVB Drama Characters	Nominated
2016	Over Run Over	Favourite TVB Onscreen Couple (with Vincent Wong)	Won
2017	Legal Mavericks	Favourite TVB Supporting Actress	Nominated (Top 5)
2017	Legal Mavericks	Favourite TVB Drama Characters	Nominated
2017	Legal Mavericks	Favourite TVB Onscreen Couple (with Vincent Wong and Sisley Choi)	Nominated

=== StarHub TVB Awards ===
Year	Nominee / work	Award	Result
2014	Tomorrow is Another Day	My Favourite TVB Supporting Actress	Nominated
2014	Tomorrow is Another Day	Most Improved TVB Artiste	Nominated
2015	Smooth Talker, The Fixer	Most Improved TVB Artiste	Won
2016	Over Run Over	My Favourite TVB Actress	Nominated
2016	Over Run Over	My Favourite TVB Female TV Characters	Won
2016	—N/a	Tokyo Bust Express the Sassy Award	Won
2017	Legal Mavericks	My Favourite TVB Supporting Actress	Nominated
2017	Legal Mavericks	My Favourite TVB Female TV Characters	Won

=== People's Choice Television Awards ===
Year	Nominee / work	Award	Result
2016	Over Run Over	People's Choice Best Actress	Nominated (Ranked 2nd)
2017	Legal Mavericks	People's Choice Most Improved Female Artiste	Nominated (Ranked 4th)

=== Hong Kong Television Awards ===
Year	Nominee / work	Award	Result
2017	Legal Mavericks	Best Supporting Actress in Drama Series	Nominated (Ranked 4th)

Preceded by Whitney Hui 許亦妮	Miss Hong Kong Pageant 2nd Runner-Up; 2012	Succeeded by Moon Lau 劉佩玥
