= K9 Cop =

Hong Kong television series

- Official poster
- Also known as: Police Dog Brother
- 警犬巴打
- Genre: Modern Drama, Police procedural, Comedy, Romance
- Created by: Hong Kong Television Broadcasts Limited
- Written by: Chan Kam-ling
- Starring: Linda Chung; Bosco Wong; Raymond Wong Ho-yin; Tracy Chu; Oscar Leung; Angel Chiang; Rebecca Chan; Jerry Ku; Kayi Cheung
- Theme music composer: Dominic Chu
- Opening theme: You Understand Me(你懂我) by Linda Chung
- Country of origin: Hong Kong
- Original language: Cantonese
- No. of episodes: 20

Production
- Executive producer: Catherine Tsang
- Producer: Wong Wai-sing
- Production location: Hong Kong
- Camera setup: Multi camera
- Running time: 45 minutes
- Production company: TVB

Original release
- Network: TVB Jade, HD Jade
- Release: 9 February – 28 February 2016

K9 Cop
- Chinese: 警犬巴打
- Cantonese Yale: Gínghyún Bādá
- Literal meaning: Police Dog Brother
Transcriptions
Standard Mandarin
- Hanyu Pinyin: Jǐngquǎn Bādǎ
- Bopomofo: ㄐㄧㄥˇ ㄑㄩㄢˇㄅㄚㄉㄚˇ
Yue: Cantonese
- Yale Romanization: Gínghyún Bādá
- Jyutping: Ging2hyun2 Baa1daa2
- IPA: [kěːŋ.hy̌ːn páː.tǎː]

K9 Cop (Chinese: 警犬巴打; Cantonese Yale: Gínghyún Bādá; literally "Police Dog Brother") is a 2016 Hong Kong police procedural romance comedy television drama created and produced by TVB, starring Bosco Wong, Linda Chung and Raymond Wong Ho-yin as the main leads, with Tracy Chu, Oscar Leung, Angel Chiang, Rebecca Chan, Jerry Ku and Kayi Cheung as the major supporting cast. Filming took place from June till October 2015 on location in Hong Kong. The drama premiered February 9, 2016 on Hong Kong's Jade and HD Jade channels, airing Monday through Sunday during its 9:30-10:30 pm timeslot, concluding February 28, 2016 with a total of 20 episodes.

The drama centers around the Hong Kong Police Force Dog Unit, showing the living facilities of the dogs and how they are trained. It also centers on the Hong Kong Agriculture, Fisheries and Conservation Department, which takes care of abandoned and stray animals.

== Synopsis ==
CID officer Lai Yat-tsau (Bosco Wong) parents died early, leaving him to take care of his three younger sisters. First younger sister Lai Suk-chu (Kayi Cheung) is a prestigious kindergarten school superintendent who is kind but gullible. Middle younger sister Jil Lai Suk-si (Tracy Chu) is a luxury brand salesperson. She is immature and money hungry. She originally dated Yat-tsau's partner Fai Chung-lim (Raymond Wong) because he is a rich restaurant heir, but after years of dating she really fell-in-love with him and wants him to quit the police force because of the dangers that comes with the job, also for him to return to being a rich heir. Youngest sister Fanny Lai Suk-fan (Angel Chiang) is rude and lazy, who refuses to find a job. She is also the only one in the family that is married. Her husband Ma Chi-chung (Oscar Leung) works at the Agriculture, Fisheries and Conservation Department, but his attitude is very similar to his wife and often mooches off of his in-laws.

Lai Yat-tsau is a reckless cop who does major damages to the streets of Hong Kong when he is chasing crooks. His recklessness drags his partner Chung-lim down with him. Together the pair are nicknamed "Faw Sui" Sir (which means "Kerosene" in Chinese) and "Fai Chia" Sir (which means "Firewood" in Chinese) because the two are tend to start a fire. When Yat-tsau's former informant Lui Kam-bo (Jerry Ku) seeks his protection from his recently released older twin brother Lui Kam-dong (Jerry Ku), that Kam-bo had helped Yat-tsau put in prison. Yat-tsau trails Kam-dong's every move to make sure he doesn't kill Kam-bo. During a drug bust between Kam-dong and his former gang, Yat-tsau gets attacked by the gangs guard dog named Bah-da (Hong Kong saying of the English word "Brother").

While recovering from a dog bit in the hospital he meets Ma Chi-ho (Linda Chung), who is more concern for Bah-da then Yat-tsau's injuries. Chi-ho's political correctness and bluntness ends up offending Yat-tsau which leads to the two becoming enemies. Ma Chi-ho is a veterinarian for the Agriculture, Fisheries and Conservation Department. Her love for animals overshadows her consideration for others and her blunt know it all attitude offends people she speaks to. Due to her love for dogs, she became estrange with her mother Madam Chung when her mother had her police dog overworked, leading to his death; Madam Chung is also Yat-tsau's new supervisor. Her younger brother who also happens to coincidentally be Yat-tsau's brother-in-law Chi-chung works alongside her, but he too can't stand her because she made him feel stupid when they were growing up.

To prevent Bah-da from being euthanized, Chi-ho must find a reason proving he is not a dangerous dog. When Bah-da sniff out an Agriculture, Fisheries and Conservation Department employee with drugs on him, Chi-ho realizes that Bah-da knows how to detect illegal substances and recommends that Bah-da be trained as a police dog. Madam Chung also forces Yat-tsau's to transfer to the Police Dog Unit so that he can learn some disciplinary; Yat-tsau is later paired up with Bah-da.

== Cast ==
=== Ma & Chung family ===
- Rebecca Chan as Chung Wai-kin (鍾慧堅)

Madam Chung, a Chief Superintendent of Hong Kong Police Force Kwun Tong District. Chi-ho and Chi-chung's mother, who she is both estranged from. She is also Yat-tsau and Chung-lim's new head supervisor. She is a legend in the Hong Kong Police Force since she has worked in all the departments of the force. Yat-tsau idolizes her and thought she was interested in him, but she only got close to him because she wants to reconcile with her son Chi-chung, who is Yat-tsau's brother-in-law and lives at his home.

- Linda Chung as Ma Chi-ho (馬志昊)(homophone to 媽子好, Mother is good)

Chung Wai-kin's daughter and Ma Chi-chung's older sister, who she is both estranged from. A veterinarian at the Agriculture, Fisheries and Conservation Department. Her love for animals is far greater than for people, which leads her to be inconsiderate of others. Her blunt and know it all attitude often offends people she speaks to which leads her and Yat-tsau to become enemies and her brother Chi-chung not able to stand her.

- Oscar Leung as Ma Chi-chung (馬志沖)

Chung Wai-kin's son and Ma Chi-ho's younger brother, whom he is both estranged from. He works as a help staff at the Agriculture, Fisheries and Conservation Department's alongside Chi-ho whom he can't stand. Fanny's husband and Yat-tsau, Suk-chu and Jil's brother-in-law. He lives with his wife's family and sometimes mooches off of them. His relationship with his sister improves when he finds out why she doesn't get along with their mother and that she is a lonely person with no friends.

- Lau Kong as Chung Ying-may (鍾英美; homophone to 中英美, China, United Kingdom and United States)

Chung Wai-kin's father. Ma Chi-ho's maternal grandfather. Like the rest of his family, he is estranged to his daughter and grand child.

- Henry Lo as Sheung-Kun (尚官, homophone to 上官, a Chinese plural-surname)

Ma Chi-ho's father, professor of Heung-Shing University (homophone to Hong Kong University)

=== Lai family ===
- Bosco Wong as Lai Yat-tsau (黎溢湫; nicknamed Faw Sui Sir (火水Sir), meaning "Kerosene Sir" in Chinese)

Lai Suk-chu, Suk-si and Suk-fan's older brother who was left to care for them at an early age because his mother died from her husband's domestic abuse. He does not respect his late father, who was a drug addict. He is a police officer in the Crime Investigation Department where he is partnered with Fai Chung-lim who also happens to be his mid younger sister Jil's boyfriend. Due to his recklessness on the job he often receives scoldings from his supervisor Pao Sir. The new station supervisor Madam Chung transfer him to the Police Dog Unit so he can learn some disciplinary.

- Kayi Cheung as Lai Suk-chu (黎淑珠)

Lai Yat-tsau's 1st younger sister and Suk-si and Suk-fan's older sister. A kindergarten school superintendent at a prestigious elementary school. She is kind and gullible who lets others take advantage of her kindness. She strikes up a friendship with Yat-tsau's former informant Lui Kam-bo, but Kam-bo is only using her to get his hands on her kindergarten entrance exam and sell it to parents who want their children to get accepted at her school. Her real dream is to become a published manga author.

- Tracy Chu as Jil Lai Suk-chi (黎淑姿)

Lai Yat-tsau and Suk-chu's younger sister, Suk-fan's elder sister. Fai Chung-lim's girlfriend who wants him to quit his job as a police officer. A salesperson at a luxury branded shop. Her brother describes her to Chung-lim as money hungry and originally only dated him because he comes from a rich family.

- Angel Chiang as Fanny Lai Suk-fan (黎淑芬)

The youngest of the Lai siblings and Ma Chi-chung's wife. She is lazy and rude. She is only unemployed because she refuses to find a job. She has never met her in-laws because her husband is estranged from his family, however she meets Ma Chi-ho at a market who belittles her after seeing her rudeness.

- Ricky Lee as Lai's father (黎父)

Lai Yat-tsau, Suk-chu, Suk-si and Suk-fan's father. He is drug addict who stole from his family and was willing to sell a twelve year old Jil as a prostitute in order to fuel his drug addiction.

=== Fai family ===
- Cecilia Fong as So Fu-gwai (蘇賦貴)

Fai Chung-lim's mother. A rich and successful restaurateur who owns the So Si Huk Catering Group. She does not approve of Chung-lim and Jil's relationship because she knows that Jil is a gold digger.

- Raymond Wong Ho-yin as Fai Chung-lim (費頌廉; nicknamed Fai Chia Sir (費柴Sir), meaning "Useless firewood Sir" in Hong Kong slang)

So Fu-gwai's son. A rich restaurant heir who choose to be a police officer because he loves the job. He works in the Crime Investigation Department and is partnered with Yat-tsau. He is also Yat-tsau's younger sister Suk-si's boyfriend. Suk-si wants him to quit his job as a cop, which make him torn between the two but chooses to continue being a cop because he loves the job more than her. He is a lady killer who is able to charm females of all ages.

=== Agriculture, Fisheries and Conservation Department ===
- Gary Chan as Lam Mo-nung (林務農)
- Eddie Ho as Kung Yan (恭仁; homophone to servant 工人 in Chinese)
- Ocean Wong as Lin Wai-man (連獲文)
- Andy Sui as Yee Wing-kee (施永基)
- Alan Tam Kwan Lun as Kit (傑)
- Chan Min-leung as King Suk (景叔)

=== Hong Kong Police Force ===
Kwun Tong Police Station

- Joseph Yeung as Pao Fat-li (包法利)

Pao Sir, Chief Inspector of Police. Yat-tsau and Chung-lim's unsupportive supervisor who gives them both scoldings when possible.

- Jimmy Au as Yeung On (楊鞍)

A triad undercover in the police force. One of Fai's colleague, he is trying to kill Chi-tung Po in the CID office, but stopped by Fai, and Po escapes. Then he tries to kill Fai, but stopped by a shooting fired by Madam Chung.

- Dickson Lee as Hon Leung (韓良)
- Glen Lee as Sing Chui (成隋)
- Jess Sum as Ho Yuen-gwan (何婉君)

An administrative assistant in the same unit as Yat-tsau and Chung-lim. She has a huge crush on Chung-lim and wants to be his new girlfriend. She hates and can't stand Yat-tsau.

- Aurora Li as Chun Bo (秦篰)(homophone to 巡捕, polices during the Republic of China mainland period)

Police Dog Unit

*(all names are homophone to the Cantonese translation of characters from Japanese Anime Captain Tsubasa)

- Eric Chung as Tai Tse-wai (戴賜偉)

Tai Sir, Chief Inspector of the Police dog unit.

- Stephen Ho as Lam Yuen-sam (林元三; homophone to 林源三)

A senior officer with the Police dog unit.

- Wong Yee-kam as Mak Tai-loi (麥泰萊)

A senior officer with the Police dog unit.

- Ho Chun-hin as Gut Leung (吉樑; homophone to 吉良)
- LuLu Kai as Chung San-gwong (叢山光; homophone to 松山光)

A rookie officer with the Police Dog unit.

- Alex Yung as AuYeung Kin-wai (歐陽健威)

A rookie officer with the Police Dog unit.

- Gary Tam as Lo Bei-dou (盧彼渡)

=== Extended cast ===
- Jerry Ku as Lui Kam-dong (雷錦鐺) & Lui Kam-bo (雷錦波)

Lui Kam-dong (雷錦鐺; nicknamed Sha Pei (沙皮), which means bulldog and being arrogant in Cantonese)
Lui Kam-bo's older identical twin brother. A former triad boss sent to prison eight years ago by Yat-tsau with the help of his brother Kam-bo testifying against him. Recently released from prison he is out for revenge against Kam-bo and to make Yat-tsau's life miserable. He goes into hiding when a meeting over drugs with his former gang goes wrong.
Lui Kam-bo (雷錦波; nicknamed Chi Tung Po (自動波) which means automatic car shift in Cantonese)
Lui Kam-dong's younger identical twin brother. Yat-tsau's former informant who now seeks his protection against his older brother. Unlike his brother he is a coward and opportunist. He befriends Yat-tsau's first younger sister Lai Suk-chu because she is gullible and to make money by stealing and selling the entrance exam from the prestigious kindergarten she works for. Later on he really starts to like her because she is genuinely kind to him.

- 6-Wing as Risk Liu Lee-si (廖理思; homophone to 料理師, cooking master, 料理 means cooking from Japanese )

An illegal narcotics developer that works for American gang bosses. He is a graduate of Massachusetts Institute of Technology (MIT). He develops new experimental narcotic from a room in Hong Kong that he calls a kitchen and uses girls he picks up as guinea pigs to test out these new drugs. He pretends to be a barrister to court Jil in front of Chung-lim because he likes her but he also uses her as a guinea pig for his drugs. He is responsible for Katie's death.

- Wong Chun as Tai Sam (戴森; homophone to 泰臣, a Cantonese translation for Mike Tyson)

A long time employee of Chung-lim's mother So Fu-gwai. He manages the Hong Kong style cafe that Yat-tsau and Chung-lim always frequent.

- Janice Shum as Jenny Law San (羅珊)

So Fu-gwai's personal secretary.

- Liu Si-lok as Mo Ching-ching (毛晴晴)

An overweight and middle aged lady wanted for money laundering. She becomes charmed by Chung-lim when he tries to stop her from leaving the country.

- Mark Ma as Siu Bak lim (小白臉)

One of Lui Kam-dong's gang members. He holds a flash drive that has evidence against Mo Ching-ching.

- Eddie Law as Lai Hei-bau (舐屎豹)

Lui Kam-dong's former gang member who betrays him. Bah-da's original owner.

- Kerry Chan as Jackie

Jil's friend that dress like a male. Yat-tsau and Chung-lim mistakes him as a man when she takes Jil home.

- Samantha Chuk as Charlie

So Fu-gwai's best friend who warns her about Jil being a gold digger because her husband almost had an indecent affair with Jil. Katie's mother.

- Kiko Leung as Katie

Charlie's daughter. Her hard partying lifestyle leads her to become a victim of Risk Liu who uses her to test his experimental drugs which causes her death due to overdosing.

== Soundtrack ==
The main opening theme song "You Got Me" (你懂我) was sung by Linda Chung, composed by Dominic Chu and lyrics by Hayes Yeung. A Mandarin Chinese sub theme song sometimes played during the closing credits named "Listen to the Sea" (聽海) is performed by The Voice season four participate Vivian Koo, composed and lyrics by Taiwanese composer and producer Michael Tu.

Track listing

| No. | Title | Lyrics | Music | Singer(s) | Length |
|---|---|---|---|---|---|
| 1. | "You Got Me" (你懂我) | Hayes Yeung | Dominic Chu | Linda Chung | 3:23 |
| 2. | "Listen to the Sea" (聽海) | Michael Tu | Michael Tu | Vivian Koo | 4:13 |

== Development and production ==
- Bosco Wong and Linda Chung were named as leads to an upcoming TVB drama in March 2015. This will be their second pairing together, after TVB 2012 drama Witness Insecurity.
- The costume fitting and blessing ceremony was held simultaneously on June 22, 2015 12:30 pm at Tseung Kwan O TVB City Studio One Common Room.
- Filming took place from June till October 2015, entirely on location in Hong Kong. Major filming locations were the Kwun Tong Police Station, Agriculture, Fisheries and Conservation Department at Cheung Sha Wan Road, Kowloon and Police Dog Unit Headquarters at Sha Ling village, Sandy Ridge, Hong Kong.
- K9 Cop is Raymond Wong's first drama since recovering from Behçet's disease.
- A promo image of K9 Cop was featured in TVB's 2016 calendar for the month of June.

== Viewership ratings ==
| Timeslot (HKT) | # | Day(s) | Week | Episode(s) | Average points | Peaking points |
|---|---|---|---|---|---|---|
| Mon - Sun (9:30-10:30 pm); 21:30–22:30 | 1 | Mon - Fri | 09 - 12 Feb 2016 | 1 — 4 | 24 | -- |
| Mon - Sun (9:30-10:30 pm); 21:30–22:30 | 1 | Sat | 13 Feb 2016 | 5 | 22 | -- |
| Mon - Sun (9:30-10:30 pm); 21:30–22:30 | 2 | Mon - Fri | 15 - 19 Feb 2016 | 6 — 10 | 28 | 29 |
| Mon - Sun (9:30-10:30 pm); 21:30–22:30 | 2 | Sat | 20 Feb 2016 | 11 | 20 | -- |
| Mon - Sun (9:30-10:30 pm); 21:30–22:30 | 2 | Sun | 21 Feb 2016 | 12 | 22 | -- |
| Mon - Sun (9:30-10:30 pm); 21:30–22:30 | 3 | Mon - Fri | 22 - 26 Feb 2016 | 13 — 17 | 27 | -- |
| Mon - Sun (9:30-10:30 pm); 21:30–22:30 | 3 | Sat | 27 Feb 2016 | 18 | 17 | -- |
| Mon - Sun (9:30-10:30 pm); 21:30–22:30 | 3 | Sun | 28 Feb 2016 | 19 — 20 | 26 | -- |
| Total average | | | | | 25 | 31 |

February 14, 2016: No episode broadcast due to airing From Vegas to Macau .

== International broadcast ==
| Network | Country | Airing Date | Timeslot |
|---|---|---|---|
| Astro On Demand | Malaysia | February 9, 2016 | Monday – Sunday 9:30 – 10:30 pm |
| 8TV | Malaysia | February 9, 2018 | Monday – Friday 7:00 – 8:00 pm |
| TVBJ | Australia | February 10, 2016 | Monday – Friday 8:15 – 9:15 am |
| TVBJ | Australia | February 10, 2016 | Saturday – Sunday 9:00 – 10:00 pm |
| Starhub TV | Singapore | June 6, 2016 | Monday – Friday 8:00 – 9:00 pm |

== Awards and nominations ==
| Year | Ceremony | Category | Nominee | Result |
|---|---|---|---|---|
| 2016 | StarHub TVB Awards | My Favourite TVB Drama | K9 Cop | Nominated |
| 2016 | StarHub TVB Awards | My Favourite TVB Actress | Linda Chung | Nominated |
| 2016 | StarHub TVB Awards | My Favourite TVB Actor | Bosco Wong | Nominated |
| 2016 | StarHub TVB Awards | My Favourite TVB Supporting Actor | Oscar Leung | Nominated |
| 2016 | StarHub TVB Awards | My Favourite TVB Male TV Character | Bosco Wong | Nominated |
| 2016 | StarHub TVB Awards | My Favourite TVB Male TV Character | Raymond Wong Ho-yin | Nominated |
| 2016 | StarHub TVB Awards | My Favourite TVB Male TV Character | Oscar Leung | Nominated |
| 2016 | StarHub TVB Awards | My Favourite Onscreen Couple | Bosco Wong & Linda Chung | Nominated |
| 2016 | TVB Star Awards Malaysia | My Favourite TVB On Screen Couple | Bosco Wong & Linda Chung | Nominated |
| 2016 | TVB Star Awards Malaysia | My Favourite Top 15 TVB Drama Characters | Linda Chung | Nominated |
| 2016 | TVB Star Awards Malaysia | My Favourite Top 15 TVB Drama Characters | Raymond Wong Ho-yin | Nominated |
| 2016 | TVB Anniversary Awards | Best Series | K9 Cop | Nominated |
| 2016 | TVB Anniversary Awards | Best Actor | Raymond Wong Ho-yin | Nominated |
| 2016 | TVB Anniversary Awards | Best Actress | Linda Chung | Nominated |
| 2016 | TVB Anniversary Awards | Most Popular TV Female Character | Linda Chung | Nominated |
| 2016 | TVB Anniversary Awards | Best Supporting Actor | Oscar Leung | Nominated |
| 2016 | TVB Anniversary Awards | Most Popular Series Song | "You Got Me" (你懂我) by Linda Chung | Nominated |
| 2016 | TVB Anniversary Awards | Most Popular Series Song | "Listen to the Sea" (聽海) by Vivian Koo | Nominated |
