= The Executioner (TV series) =

Hong Kong television series

- Official poster
- Also known as: Spare From the Blade
- 刀下留人
- Genre: Historical period drama
- Created by: Hong Kong Television Broadcasts Limited
- Written by: Sin Chui-ching, Au Yuk-han, Tam Chui-san, Fung Yat-chun, Chan Siu-cheung, Ma Ching-man, Cheung Kai-wing
- Directed by: Wong Wai-yan, Cheung Wing-fai, Ng Ciu-wing, Cheng Wing-kay, Lam Wai-ching, Au Yuk-han, Tam Chui-san, Fung Yat-chun, Chan Siu-cheung, Ma Ching-man, Cheung Kai-wing
- Starring: Kenny Wong; Maggie Shiu; Mat Yeung; Katy Kung; Elaine Yiu; Joel Chan; Bowie Wu; Hugo Ng; Stanley Cheung
- Theme music composer: Alan Cheung
- Opening theme: A Better Tomorrow (相信明天) by Hubert Wu
- Country of origin: Hong Kong
- Original language: Cantonese
- No. of episodes: 26

Production
- Executive producer: Catherine Tsang
- Producer: Law Chun-ngok
- Production location: Hong Kong
- Editor: Sin Chui-ching
- Camera setup: Multi camera
- Running time: 45 minutes
- Production company: TVB

Original release
- Network: Jade; HD Jade
- Release: 7 December 2015 – 10 January 2016

The Executioner
- Chinese: 刀下留人
- Cantonese Yale: Dōuhah Làuyàn
- Literal meaning: "Spare From The Blade"
Transcriptions
Standard Mandarin
- Hanyu Pinyin: Dāoxià Liúrén
Yue: Cantonese
- Yale Romanization: Dōuhah Làuyàn
- Jyutping: Dou1haa6 Lau4jan4

The Executioner (Chinese: 刀下留人; literally "Spare From The Blade") is a 2015-2016 Hong Kong historical fiction television drama produced by TVB. It is set during the Chenghua Emperor's reign in Ming Dynasty, China, and centers on a political conspiracy.

Filming took place from January to April 2015 on location entirely in Hong Kong. It premiered on 7 December 2015, on Hong Kong's broadcast network TVB Jade and Malaysia's cable television channel, Astro On Demand. It ran for 26 episodes, with the last episode airing on 10 January 2016. The Executioner received positive reviews during its broadcast.

== Background ==
The drama is a fictional telling of the events that occurred during Ming dynasty's Chenghua Emperor reign. In actuality, the Chenghua Emperor had taken his nanny who was a mother figure to him as a consort. Consort Wan as she became known was twice the age of the Emperor, he was eighteen and she was thirty-five at the time she became his consort, but she became his favorite consort and gave birth to a son who died soon after. However Consort Wan was also an unscrupulous person who along with high ranking eunuchs would sell government titles to anyone willing to pay a high price. In terms those who bought these titles illegally would abuse their titles by raising taxes to unreasonable amounts in their county's or deal in illegal activities without getting punishment. The Emperor who did not want to offend Consort Wan would turn a blind eye on these issues. Unable to bear the Emperor a child, fearing others will be favored by the Emperor and also to continue her hold on the Emperor, Consort Wan would command her servants and eunuchs to force abortion on any consorts that became pregnant with the Emperor's child. If any consort did get the chance to carry the Emperor's child to birth both mother and child would soon be murdered. After finding out a concubine named Ji is pregnant, Empress Wu protects her and the unborn child by entrusting them in the care of the gate keeper, but Consort Wan's finds out and seeks to murder the gate keeper, Concubine Ji and her child. The child survives and is reunited with Emperor Chenghua at age five. The child later grows up to be the future Hongzhi Emperor.

== Synopsis ==
One takes away life; the other welcomes life. Midwife Fa Yui-hung and executioner Yip Sheung-luk come together when they must protect a new life who is wanted dead by the Imperial government.

During Ming dynasty's Chenghua Emperor reign, Fa Yui-hung is the most renowned midwife in the capital. Her services are highly sought after by the rich and poor. She is a compassionate person that won't do harm to others even if she is paid a high price. One night a mysterious man Yip Sheung-luk shows up at her door step claiming to be the savior of her father-in-law who is away on a journey. As her father-in-law's savior, Sheung-luk claims he was welcomed to stay at the Bak household. After finding items in her home missing Yui-hung trails Sheung-luk around town, only to find that he is hiding a heavily pregnant woman who he is tasked to protect. Yui-hung agrees to help the pregnant woman, but Sheung-luk refuses to tell her the identity or background of the pregnant woman.

After saving the life of the local warden from an escaped fugitive, Sheung-luk is offered the position as the towns executioner. As he sees it as a profession everyone in town sees him as a murderer including Yui-hung who mocks him whenever she gets a chance. No one wants to be associated with him and in order to receive company he goes to the local brothel just to pay for any courtesan willing to keep him company while he has dinner.

Walking through the woods one night Sheung-luk and Yui-hung finds a ditch with a pregnant woman left for dead. After the woman dies Yui-hung immediately instructs Sheung-luk to save the baby inside the dead woman. After the baby boy is born Yui-hung wants to bring the baby to the authorities but Sheung-luk knows the dead woman was not a regular person by looking at her accessories and clothing. In order to protect him and his savior's daughter-in-law, he advises Yui-hung not to go to the authorities yet. The new born baby boy soon gets them both in trouble when they become the most wanted criminals in the kingdom. The two go through many dangers to keep themselves alive and protect the baby boy with a mysterious connection to the Chenghua Emperor.

== Cast ==
=== Bak family/household ===
- Maggie Shiu as Fa Yui-hung 花蕊紅
- Bowie Wu as Bak Chin-chung 白千松
- Law Lok-lam as Fa Choi-san 花在山
- Hebe Chan as Chiu Sui-ying 趙小櫻
- Max Choi as Lok Yeung 洛陽

=== Imperial prison department ===
- Kenny Wong as Yip Sheung-luk 葉常綠
- Glen Lee as Mak Sau-ching 墨守成
- Louis Szeto as Yan 仁
- Mark Ma as Yee 義
- Kelvin Yuen as Lai 禮
- Man Yeung as Chi 智

=== Yin Hung Garden brothel ===
- Mat Yeung as Chek Tsz-chau 赤知秋
- Katy Kung as Chuk Siu-moon 祝小滿
- Leo Tsang as Yue Gwai 饒歸
- Samantha Chuk as Leung Bo 梁保
- Rachel Kan as Chek Ching-ha 赤映霞
- Roxanne Tong as San Yut 新月
- Matthew Chu as Ah Gau 阿九
- Kayley Chung as Yin-yin 燕燕
- Siu Koi-yan as Ang-ang 鶯鶯
- Nicole Wan as May Leung 媚娘
- Helen Seng as Siu Kam 小琴

=== Imperial Court ===
- Stanley Cheung as Chenghua Emperor 明宪宗朱見深
- Jess Sum as Empress Wu 吳皇后
- Akina Hong as Consort Wan 萬貞兒
- Hugo Ng as Lee Chi-sing 李孜省
- Jimmy Au as Tai Wai-yan 戴懷恩
- Joel Chan as Sima Chau 司馬丑
- Chan Wing-chun as Cheung Ping 章平
- Eddie Li as Pang Gwai 彭貴
- Cheung Chun-ping as Chow Tai 周泰
- Judy Tsang as Kei Siu-guan 紀小娟
- Rocky Cheng as Kam On 金安
- Alex Lam as Siu Tak-chi 小德子
- Lucy Li as Yuk Cham 玉簪
- Deborah Poon as Ling Yung 凌容

=== Extended cast ===
- Elaine Yiu as Yuen So-sam 阮素心
- Mak Ka-lun as Wing Siu-ho 榮兆豪
- Kitty Lau as Kau Cho 裘棗
- Kelvin Lee as Lau Seung-hei 劉雙囍
- Kedar Wong as Wo Him 和謙
- Lee Yee-man as Sik Cheung-yee 翟霜兒
- Yeung Chiu-hoi as Cheung Hon-lam 張翰林
- Mok Wai-man as Senior Sik 翟老爺
- Gary Tam as Choi Chin-wan 蔡展雲
- Jones Lee as Yen Tai-bak 殷泰伯
- Derek Wong as Mysterious person 神秘人
- Wang Wai-tak as Ling Kim-fung 凌劍鋒
- Snow Suen as Liu Ching-ching 呂青青

== Development ==
- The costume fitting ceremony was held on January 7, 2015 at 12:30 pm Tseung Kwan O TVB City Studio One Common Room.
- The blessing ceremony was held on March 5, 2015 at 2:00 pm Tseung Kwan O TVB City Studio Thirteen.
- Filming took place from January to April 2015 at TVB Ancient City backlot and on location around Hong Kong.

== Viewership ratings ==
Timeslot (HKT)	#	Week	Episode(s)	Average points	Peaking points
Mon – Fri (8:30-9:30 pm); 20:30–21:30	1	07 – 11 Dec 2015	1 – 5	23	25
Mon – Fri (8:30-9:30 pm); 20:30–21:30	2	14 – 18 Dec 2015	6 – 10	22	24
Mon – Fri (8:30-9:30 pm); 20:30–21:30	3	21 – 25 Dec 2015	11 – 15	22	25
Mon – Fri (8:30-9:30 pm); 20:30–21:30	4	28 Dec 2015 – 01 Jan 2016	16 – 20	23	--
Mon – Fri (8:30-9:30 pm); 20:30–21:30	5	04 – 08 Jan 2016	21 – 25	25	31
Mon – Fri (8:30-9:30 pm); 20:30–21:30	5	Sun 10 Jan 2016	21 – 26	28	--
Total average				23.2	31

== International broadcast ==
Network	Country	Airing Date	Timeslot
Astro On Demand	Malaysia	December 7, 2015	Monday – Friday 8:30 – 9:15 pm
NTV7	Malaysia	September 11, 2017	Monday – Wednesday 11:00 pm – 12:00 am
TVBJ	Australia	December 8, 2015	Monday – Friday 7:15 – 8:15 pm
Starhub TV	Singapore	March 31, 2016	Monday – Friday 8:00 – 9:00 pm

== Awards and nominations ==
Year	Ceremony	Category	Nominee	Result
2016	StarHub TVB Awards	My Favourite TVB Drama	The Executioner	Nominated
2016	StarHub TVB Awards	My Favourite TVB Actress	Maggie Shiu	Nominated
2016	StarHub TVB Awards	My Favourite TVB Actor	Kenny Wong	Nominated
2016	StarHub TVB Awards	My Favourite TVB Female TV Character	Maggie Shiu	Nominated
2016	StarHub TVB Awards	My Favourite TVB Male TV Character	Kenny Wong	Nominated
2016	TVB Star Awards Malaysia	My Favourite TVB Actress in a Supporting Role	Akina Hong	Nominated
2016	TVB Anniversary Awards	Best Series	The Executioner	Nominated
2016	TVB Anniversary Awards	Best Actor	Kenny Wong	Nominated
2016	TVB Anniversary Awards	Best Actress	Maggie Shiu (Top 5)	Nominated
2016	TVB Anniversary Awards	Most Popular TV Female Character	Akina Hong	Nominated
2016	TVB Anniversary Awards	Best Supporting Actor	Law Lok-lam	Nominated
2016	TVB Anniversary Awards	Best Supporting Actress	Akina Hong	Nominated
2016	TVB Anniversary Awards	Best Supporting Actress	Elaine Yiu	Nominated
2016	TVB Anniversary Awards	Most Popular Series Song	A Better Tomorrow (相信明天) by Hubert Wu	Nominated
