= Over Run Over =

Hong Kong television series

- Official poster
- Also known as: EU: Time-Travel Mission
- EU超時任務
- Genre: Serial drama Science fiction Action; Thriller
- Created by: Lam Chi-wah
- Written by: Ng Lap-kwong (head writer); Cheung Ying-wai; Wong Sau-ching; Lau Chee-heng
- Starring: Vincent Wong; Tracy Chu; Benjamin Yuen; Pal Sinn; Christine Kuo; Zoie Tam; Rebecca Zhu
- Theme music composer: Damon Chui
- Ending theme: "True Lovers" (最真心一對) by Stephanie Ho
- Country of origin: Hong Kong
- Original language: Cantonese
- No. of episodes: 22; 20 (HK broadcast)

Production
- Producer: Lam Chi-wah
- Production location: Hong Kong
- Camera setup: Multi camera
- Running time: 45 minutes
- Production company: TVB

Original release
- Network: TVB Jade
- Release: 21 March – 10 April 2016

Over Run Over
- Traditional Chinese: EU超時任務
- Simplified Chinese: EU超时任务
- Literal meaning: EU Over Time Mission
Transcriptions
Standard Mandarin
- Hanyu Pinyin: EU Chāoshí Rènwù
Yue: Cantonese
- Yale Romanization: EU Chīusìh yahmmouh
- Jyutping: EU Ciu1si4 Jam6mou6
- IPA: [iːjuːtsʰiːú.si̭ː jɐ̀m.mòu]

Over Run Over (Chinese: EU超時任務; Cantonese Yale: EU Chīusìh yahmmouh) is a 2016 Hong Kong action-thriller television drama created and produced by Lam Chi-wah for TVB. The show centres on a police officer who, after traveling back in time to prevent her father's death, experiences severe repercussions of the butterfly effect. Over Run Over premiered on 21 March 2016 on TVB Jade, and is the tenth highest-rated television drama of 2016.

== Synopsis ==
While on patrol duty, EU sergeant Ling Sun-fung and her team are called to assist a criminal chase. A gun battle erupts and Sun-fung loses her father, who dies from a stray bullet to the head. Sun-fung continues the pursuit, but a strange natural phenomena suddenly turns her away, taking her back to April 1—three days prior to the incident. Realising that she has traveled back in time, she uses this opportunity to save her father's life.

Village chief "Ditch", an informant for the ICAC, discovers Sun-fung's special ability and teams up with her to investigate a corrupted cop. Unfortunately, their persistent disruption to the timeline causes severe butterfly effects, with unsettling consequences. Sun-fung learns that her power to change the past does not make her able to control the future.

Cycle	Traveller(s)	End of Cycle
Cycle 1	Ling, (Wai Ye)	Ling's father is killed by a stray bullet in the shootout
Cycle 2	Ling, (Wai Ye)	Ling's father is found dead in the car boot as a result of the shootout
Cycle 3	Ling, (Wai Ye)	Tim is killed for unknown reasons
Cycle 4	Ling, (Wai Ye)	Ling tries to save the mysterious informant who calls her
Cycle 5	Ling, (Wai Ye)	Ling tries to save the undercover who was killed by Chin-Cheung
Cycle 6	Ling, Guan, (Wai Ye)	Guan tries to save his own life after being uncovered as the ICAC informant, Ling also returns as she does not trust Guan
Cycle 7	Ling, Guan, (Wai Ye)	Explosion caused by Gwong and Hong, Guan knocks out Ling and brings her back
Cycle 8	Ling, Guan, (Wai Ye)	Ling returns to clear her father's name in the murder of Chow Bing-Yan, Guan returns to save Chow Bing-Yan for the sake of his career
Cycle 9	Ling, Guan, Wai Ye	Ling and Guan return by accident, chasing Wai Ye
Cycle 10	Ling, Guan, Wai Ye, Kwok	Ling and Guan return after a shootout with the corrupt officer, Wai Ye is followed by Kwok to the portal
Cycle 11	Guan	After shootout with Kwok, in which Ling and Kwok die from fire burns, Guan returns to the portal to see her again, Wai Ye declines to enter the portal again

== Cast and characters ==
=== Main Leads ===
- Vincent Wong as Hugo Kwan Ding-ming (關鼎名; Gwaan Dingming) — also known as Ditch (渠頭), a wealthy village chief. He worked as an informant for the ICAC and was aware of Sun-fung's time-travelling ability.

Ditch got closed to Tom Ho, a rich man that ran on real estate business, to collect his criminal evidence. He had saved Sun-fung many times by the third time travel, but was suspected by Sun-fung that he was behind the four gangsters. However by the fifth time travel of Sun-fung, his identity was revealed by Sun-fung.

Ditch was nearly killed by Tom in the fifth time travel. His identity was discovered by Kam Ye, who used to eventually discovered his recruiting by ICAC. He was saved by Sau-kei who was asked to look after him by Sun-fung. He finally discovered the time travel ability of Sun-fung. He went to the electric tower by midnight of April 3rd to complete his tasks by going the sixth time travel.

During the sixth time travel, Ditch did something that caused a butterfly effect that eventually burned the BBQ field by an explosion which did by Hong, a closed friend of Sun-kwong and former student of Hoi.

During the seventh time travel, the problem is solved.

In the ninth time travel, Ditch kidnapped Tom and exposed his identity. He stole Tom’s narcotics in order to make him and the corrupt cop fight each other, but Tom was easily killed by the corrupt cop. Ditch then failed in his fight against the corrupt cop and nearly died.

During the tenth time travel, he discovered the corrupt cop was Sheung-ching, but later found out he was just covering his father Kwok Wai-Shing. He and Wai Ye together knocked out Wai-shing in the shipyard, but Sheung-ching revenged on the third day which caused Sun-fung and his death. He decided to time travel again, alone, in order to see her alive.

During the eleventh time travel, while Sun-fung no longer remembered him, he resolved all the major issues as discovered in previous time travels. Ditch got back the necklace on the fourth day in Sun-fung's yard which seemed to reawaken her memory of previous time travels.

- Tracy Chu as WSGT Ling Sun-Fung (凌晨風; jyutping: Ling Sanfung) — a sergeant in HKP's Emergency Unit. She discovered an electricity pylon where a time portal would open at 00:00:00 on April 4, allowing her to travel back in time to the same day, April 1.

In the original timeline, her father was killed by a crossfire between her EU team and the four heavily armed gangsters on April 3. Sun-fung discovered the time portal by accident, and was miraculously brought back in time to April 1. In this her first time travel, she tried to prevent her father's death but failed.

In her second time travel, Sun-fung finally rescued her father from the crossfire, but her colleague was seemingly killed by head of the gang. The third time travelling, she and Wai Ye successfully arrested the four gangsters at the 1st day's evening which prevented her father's death. She also realised that her colleague was actually killed by his jealous and mentally unstable fiancée, and managed to stop the homicide before it happened. However, she also discovered that an undercover got killed in the process, compelling her to travel back in time to save him.

In her fourth time travel, Sun-fung discovered that Sau-Kei is the undercover and Tom was behind the crimes. However, there were more than one undercover that hid in his triad. She discovered another undercover during her fifth time travel. Even when she discovered Ditch was an ICAC informant, she does not trust him completely. Ditch followed her to the tower to go for the sixth time travel.

In her sixth time travel, Sun-fung co-operated with Ditch in order to dig out the corrupted police officer. Unfortunately, her younger brother Sun-kwong was severely wounded by an explosion, and her friend was nearly killed by Tom, while the corrupted officer remains unknown. These forced Sun-fung and Ditch to travel back in time again.

In her seventh time travel, Sun-fung threw the bomb out of harm's way in the nick of time, but sustained lower back injury. Her father Hoi mistakenly assumed that his wife was having an affair with Chow Bing-Yan, a wealthy business man running a real estate project with Chin-cheung. Hoi was later accused for the murder of Bing-Yan, and this forces Sun-fung to go back in time again.

In her eighth time travel, Sun-fung and Ditch mistakenly thought Wai Ye as the corrupt cop, but during the ninth time travel, they confirmed that Wai Ye was innocent. By the 3rd day, Sun-fung, Ditch and Wai Ye fought with a corrupt cop in the shipyard. After the lost battle against a corrupt cop, it forced them to go to the tenth time travel.

In the tenth time travel, they finally realised the corrupt cop is Sheung-ching's father, Kwok Wai-shing. Sun-fung died with Sheung-ching together by the third day after Wai-shing's death.

In the eleventh time travel which she didn’t travel at all, Sun-fung had no memory of any previous time travels, but appeared to "remember" it all after midnight on April 4th upon picking up an hourglass necklace which mysteriously appeared on her front yard.

=== Major Supporting Cast ===
- Benjamin Yuen as SGT Kwok Sheung-ching (郭尚正; Gwok Soengzing) — a sergeant in HKP's Emergency Unit, and Sun-fung's boyfriend.

Sheung-ching led another EU team, and he had a one-night stand with Crystal before dating Sun-fung. In one timeline, when the identity of the corrupted cop was finally known, he tried to protect the corrupted cop and ends up killing Sun-fung.
Sheung-ching was discovered to be a former SDU member with Wai Ye and two siblings who were actually under his father's command.

Sheung-ching later followed Wai Ye after a fight against them and discovered the secret about the electric tower and entered the time portal after them. He threatened Wai Ye to help him but finally failed.

- Pal Sinn as SGT Chan King-wai (陳勁威; Can Gingwai) — known as Wai Ye (威爺; "Lord Wai"), the van leader of Sun-fung's EU team.

He was a former SDU member. He kept silent on the work and got off on time. Wai Ye saved Sun-fung and arrested the four gangsters in her third time travel.

In Sun-fung's seventh time travel, when he was still in the car, Wai Ye saw her talking to Ditch, feeling there was something between them. He later talked to her, knowing that she had something to do with Ditch. He secretly monitored her phone, discovering that she and Ditch were the time travellers and they were trying to dig out the corrupted police officer and arrested Tom.

Wai Ye used all his money to cure his wife's cancer, which forced his family to move to a worse house. Once a real estate retailer called him and offered a new house for him, Tsz-ching worried if this could be affordable. Wai Ye later discovered it's from Tom which made he to be the suspected corrupted officer. He later revealed to Sun-fung and Ditch that he had been time travelling a hundred times before them.

- Christine Kuo as Joyce Cheung Hau-yuet (章巧悅; Zoeng Haujyut) — Ditch's ex-girlfriend.

Joyce was an investment consultant and used to be with Ditch 2 years ago. She was threatened to have sex with Ivan, who was a moneywashing banker. Joyce hacked into his account and used his money to invest but lost, and it's discovered by Ivan later. Ivan threatened her with not telling the police.

- Zoie Tam as Crystal Lee Chi-ting (李姿婷; Lei Ziting) — a news reporter, and Sun-fung's close friend.

Crystal was a journalist, she helped Sun-fung to get a lot of intels from the second time travel. But it was revealed that she had a one-night stand with Sun-fung's boyfriend, Sheung-ching.

In the fifth time travel, for safety sake, Sun-fung stopped asking her to dig out information for her. However, for benefits, Crystal discovered something was hidden from her and which was related to Tom, so she decided to go digging herself.

Crystal tried to co-operate with Ditch and dug out the crime information of Tom, but exposed by him. He threatened to kill her in the sixth time travel. She escaped from the boat and was rescued by Sheung-ching.

After being rescued in the sixth time travel, Crystal felt there was something still leaves between Kwok and herself. She was killed during the tenth time travel by the corrupt cop Wai-Shing over the secrets hidden in the USB flash drive.

- Rebecca Zhu as Fung Tsz-ching (馮芷晴; Fung Zicing) — Wai's wife.

She was Wai's wife who was dying of cancer after many failed medical treatments. She used to be a social worker and has help a lot of people before the disease. She died trying to change a light bulb by herself during Sun-fung's fifth time travel.

=== Other characters ===
- Moon Lau as Ho Siu-mei (賀小美; Ho Siumei) — a model and Sun-fung's friend. She was Tom Ho's younger sister
- Vincent Lam as Tom Ho Chin-cheung (賀展祥; Ho Zincoeng) — Siu-mei's elder brother.

Tom was a wealthy richman on surface, but indeed he was a triad boss. He was trying to sell the narcotics to the four heavily armed gangsters, but the four were arrested because of Sun-fung's intel. After that, Tom discovered that there was a traitor among them. He sought a new narcotic buyer and the traitor to be executed.

Tom had a mole inside the police force, and it's discovered by the ICAC. He was trying to kill Ditch during the fourth and fifth time travel. With Kam-Ye's help, he was able to discover that Ditch was the informant for ICAC in the fourth and fifth time travels. Chin-cheung tried to kill Sun-fung in the third time travel. By the fourth time travel, it was changed to be Crystal. Chin-cheung also tried to kill Crystal during the sixth time travel, but failed. And then Tom became interested in Crystal.

- Law Lok-lam as Ling Hoi (凌海; Ling Hoi) — Sun-fung and Sun-kwong's father. Ching-Yin's husband.

Hoi was a former school teacher, he moved to Kam Fat Wai when he is retired with his family. He loved his daughter Sun-fung. When going up a hill to get some wild honey for her, Hoi was shot under the crossfire between Sun-fung's team and the four gangsters in the original timeline.

Sun-fung travelled back in order to save him, but in the first time travel, he was still killed by a gunshot by Sun-fung. He was only successfully saved from the second time travel and on.

During the seventh time travel, it was revealed that Ching-yin was pregnant with Sun-fung when she married Hoi.

- Rosanne Lui as Siu Ching-yin (蕭青燕; Siu Chingyīn) — Sun-fung and Sun-kwong's mother. Ling Hoi's wife.

Ching-yin was unhappy to move to the countryside, and she blamed Hoi for this often. She was Chow Bing-yan's ex-girlfriend, she left him to marry Hoi while she is pregnant with Sun-fung.

- Clayton Li as Ling Sun-kwong (凌晨光; Ling Sangwong) - Ling Hoi and Ching-yin's son and Sun-fung's younger brother. He had a pet beetle named Bobby.

Sun-kwong was the only family member to believe his sister's time travel. He entered a sham marriage with a prostitute from mainland China until his sister found out during the second time travel. In the sixth time travel, he was deadly injured by an explosion which caused his sister to go for the seventh time travel to prevent this tragedy.

In the seventh time travel, it was revealed that the explosion is made by his friend Hong. He helped Hong to make the bomb, and then he regretted.

== Development and production ==
- Myolie Wu was originally offered the lead role to play Ling Sun-fung, but declined as she was planning not to renew her contract with TVB. After Wu declined the drama Kate Tsui was named as a possible replacement, but since Tsui also decided not to renew her contract with TVB Tracy Chu was eventually cast as the lead.
- Kenny Wong was originally cast in the role, Chan King Wai, but due to a schedule clash, Pal Sinn replaced him.
- The costume fitting ceremony was held on April 2, 2015, 12:30 pm at Tseung Kwan O TVB City Studio One Common Room.
- The blessing ceremony was held on April 16, 2015, 3:00 pm at Tseung Kwan O TVB City Studio 16.
- Filming took place from April until July 2015, entirely on location in Hong Kong.

== Viewership ratings ==
Timeslot (HKT)	#	Day(s)	Week	Episode(s)	Average points	Peaking points
Mon - Sun (9:30-10:30 pm); 21:30–22:30	1	Mon - Fri	21 - 25 Mar 2016	1 — 5	25	27
Mon - Sun (9:30-10:30 pm); 21:30–22:30	1	Sat	26 Mar 2016	6	22	--
Mon - Sun (9:30-10:30 pm); 21:30–22:30	1	Sun	27 Mar 2016	7	24	--
Mon - Sun (9:30-10:30 pm); 21:30–22:30	2	Mon - Fri	28 Mar - 01 Apr 2016	8 — 12	24	25
Mon - Sun (9:30-10:30 pm); 21:30–22:30	2	Sat	02 Apr 2016	13	29	--
Mon - Sun (9:30-10:30 pm); 21:30–22:30	3	Mon - Fri	04 - 08 Apr 2016	14 — 18	25	28
Mon - Sun (9:30-10:30 pm); 21:30–22:30	3	Sat	09 Apr 2016	19 — 20	29	30
Mon - Sun (9:30-10:30 pm); 21:30–22:30	3	Sun	10 Apr 2016	21 — 22	29	30
Total average					25.22	30

April 3, 2016: No episode broadcast due to airing 34th Hong Kong Film Award.

== Awards and nominations ==
Year	Ceremony	Category	Nominee	Result
2016	StarHub TVB Awards	My Favourite TVB Drama	Over Run Over	Nominated
2016	StarHub TVB Awards	My Favourite TVB Actress	Tracy Chu	Nominated
2016	StarHub TVB Awards	My Favourite TVB Actor	Vincent Wong	Nominated
2016	StarHub TVB Awards	My Favourite TVB Female TV Character	Tracy Chu	Won
2016	StarHub TVB Awards	My Favourite TVB Male TV Character	Vincent Wong	Won
2016	StarHub TVB Awards	My Favourite TVB Theme Song	"True Lovers" (最真心一對) by Stephanie Ho	Nominated

== International broadcast ==
- Malaysia - 8TV (Malaysia) (13 March - 11 April 2018)
