= Jess Sum =

Hong Kong actress

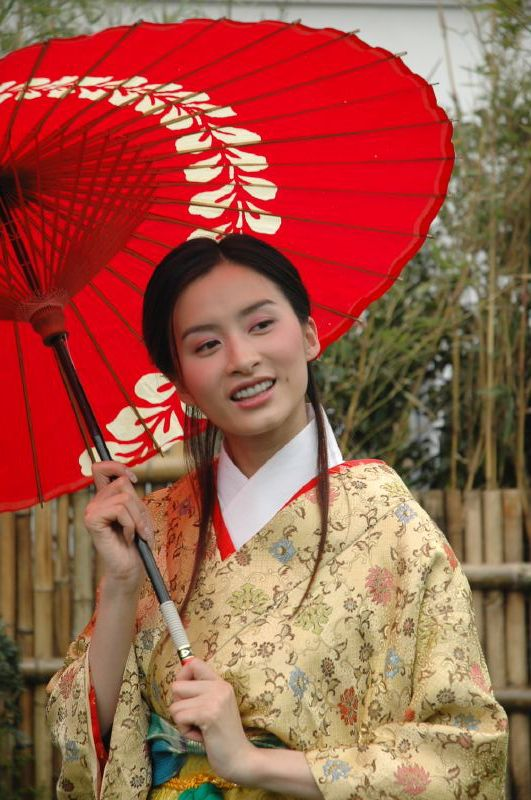
- Sum in 2005
- Born: 5 April 1982 (age 44); British Hong Kong Ancestral hometown: Qingyuan city, Guangdong province
- Occupations: Actress; model; television presenter
- Years active: 2003–present
- Spouse: Calvin To (m. 2019)

Chinese name
- Traditional Chinese: 沈卓盈
- Simplified Chinese: 沈卓盈
Transcriptions
Standard Mandarin
- Hanyu Pinyin: Shěn Zhuōyíng
Yue: Cantonese
- Jyutping: sam2 ceok6 jing4
- Musical career
- Also known as: Jess Shum
- Origin: Hong Kong

Jess Sum Cheuk-ying (traditional Chinese: 沈卓盈) (born 5 April 1982) is a Hong Kong actress previously under TVB.

== Personal life ==
Sum became good friends with co-actresses Grace Chan, Katy Kung and Zoie Tam when filming the drama The Forgotten Valley. She is close with Yoyo Chen as well.

On Jan 1 2021, Sum announced she was pregnant with her first child. On 13 May 2021, Sum announced on social media that her son Jayden was born.

== Filmography ==
=== TV dramas ===
Year	Title	Role	Notes
2004	Shine on You	Student	
2009	E.U.	Ho Wing-chi	
2009	Rosy Business	young Yan Fung-yee	
2009	D.I.E. Again	Icy Luk On-tung	
2010	Don Juan DeMercado	Super CUP Superstar contestant	
2010	The Mysteries of Love	Everlyn	
2010	Beauty Knows No Pain	Teresa	
2010	Show Me the Happy	Mandy	
2011	Relic of an Emissary	Yik Suet	
2011	Yes, Sir. Sorry, Sir!	Yuen Wing-yan	
2011	Ghetto Justice	Coco Miu Yeuk-lai	
2011	The Truth	Mary Yu	
2011	Forensic Heroes III	Calorie Lee Ka-lo	
2011	Curse of the Royal Harem	Consort Cheng	
2011	Til Love Do Us Lie		
2011	The Hippocratic Crush	Yuen Ying	
2012	Three Kingdoms RPG		
2012	House of Harmony and Vengeance	Yim Mo-chun	
2012	Silver Spoon, Sterling Shackles	Suen Fei-fei	
2013	Slow Boat Home	Amy	
2013	Triumph in the Skies II	Rachel	
2014	Ghost Dragon of Cold Mountain	Chun Mui	
2015	Every Step You Take	Angela	
2015	Lord of Shanghai	Zhu Qihong	
2015-2016	The Executioner	Empress Wu	
2016	K9 Cop	Ho Yuen-kwan	
2016	Presumed Accidents	Lau Yuk-hing	
2016	My Dangerous Mafia Retirement Plan	Tina	
2016	Short End of the Stick	Hau Sin (巧善)	
2016	Come with Me	Yau Nga (邱雅)	
2017	Bet Hur	Heung Sum-yin (向心妍)	
2018	The Forgotten Valley	Luk Bak-hang (陸北杏)	
2018	Succession War	Hitara Shuk-yung	
2018	The Stunt	Daisy	

=== Film ===
- Naked Ambition (2003)
- Dragon Loaded 2003 (2003) - Cadet
- The Jade and the Pearl (2010) - Princess Ying
- I Love Hong Kong (2011) - Young So Ching
- The Fortune Buddies (2011)
- I Love Hong Kong 2012 (2012)
- The Fallen (2019)

=== As presenter ===
- After School ICU
