= Tomorrow Is Another Day (TV series) =

Hong Kong television series

- Official poster
- 再戰明天
- Genre: Crime drama
- Created by: Hong Kong Television Broadcasts Limited
- Written by: Kwan Shu Fen 關淑芬; Chan Pow Yan 陳寶燕; Lau Ling 劉玲; Theng Sou Qun 鄧素娟; Wong Hua 黃華
- Starring: Lawrence Ng; Kate Tsui; Josie Ho; Vincent Wong; Tracy Chu; Kenny Wong; Jacqueline Wong; Pal Sinn
- Opening theme: Tomorrow Is Another Day (再戰明天) by Alfred Hui; The Chain (枷鎖) by Alfred Hui
- Country of origin: Hong Kong
- Original language: Cantonese
- No. of episodes: 20

Production
- Producer: Lam Chi-wah
- Production location: Hong Kong
- Editor: Cat Kwan Ho-Ming
- Camera setup: Multi camera
- Running time: 45 minutes
- Production company: TVB

Original release
- Network: TVB Jade, HD Jade
- Release: 6 October – 31 October 2014

Related
- Line Walker; Overachievers

Hong Kong Chinese title
- Traditional Chinese: 再戰明天
- Simplified Chinese: 再战明天
- Literal meaning: "battles tomorrow"
Transcriptions
Standard Mandarin
- Hanyu Pinyin: Zài zhàn míngtiān
Yue: Cantonese
- Jyutping: zoi3 zin3 ming4 tin1

Tomorrow Is Another Day (Chinese: 再戰明天) is an TVB prison drama produced by Lam Chi-wah. This series was featured in the TVB's 2014 Sales Presentation. A costume fitting ceremony was held on 27 January 2014.

== Production ==
Tomorrow Is Another Day is the first drama series produced by TVB about the Hong Kong Correctional Services. The drama was filmed in several actual prisons in Hong Kong.

== Cast and characters ==
=== Correctional Services Department (CSD) ===
Cast	Role	Description
Lawrence Ng	Man Seung Shing 文上升	Hong Kong Correctional Services Principal Officer; Love interest of Yiu Ngoi Ka; Youth played by Brian Chu
Kate Tsui	Yiu Ngoi Ka 姚愛嘉	Correctional Services Officer; Love interest of Man Seung Shing; She has been sexually assaulted by Ho Pak Wan 20 years ago. Youth played by Viann Ngai
Vincent Wong	Kiu Ching Kiu, Q sir 喬正橋	Correctional Services Officer; Love interest of Ting Ho Ho
Kenny Wong	Yung Wai Chun, Donald 翁偉晉	Principal Officer of Rehabillation Unit, CSD; Love interest of Chi Chun Kwong
Tracy Chu	Chi Chun Kwong 遲春光	CSD Rehabillation Unit Member; Love interest of Yung Wai Chun
Jacqueline Wong	Man Seung Yau 文上游	Man Seung Sing's younger sister Correctional Officer on Probation
Helen Shum	Yeung Lei Lei 楊莉莉	Assistant Officer
Leo Lee	Chan Wing Ho 陳永豪	Assistant Officer II
Hugo Wong		one of the Correctional officers
Nathan Ngai		one of the Correctional officers

=== Prisoners ===
Cast	Role	Description
Pal Sinn	Yip Sai Heung 葉細響; 393774	He was the main antagonist of the drama Permanent prisoner convicted for six counts of murder, including policemen, women and children Admission in prison on May 6, 2012 (shown in Episode 1); He instigated Lau Chong Kwan, who currently the boss of a triad group to attack his rival, Man Sheung Sing and Yiu Ngoi Ka in episode 5.
Josie Ho	Ting Ho Ho 丁好好; 336145	Prisoner convicted for manslaughter and has been jailed for six years She has disability that she was crippled Imprisoned from October 28, 2009; Released from prison in Episode 11; Mother of Ting Ngai-hang (丁毅恆); Love interest of Kiu Ching Kiu
Harriet Yeung	Ku Wai Chu 顧惠珠	Prisoner in Lo Wu Correctional Insituation; Has a crush on Yiu Ngoi Ka
Wai Ka Hung	To Tsz Shu 杜子書; 2867	He was jailed for murder since he was 16, and has been jailed for over 30 years. He has studied very hard in prison and was received the Master's degree of Philosophy of the Open University of Hong Kong.
Yeung Chiu Hoi	Tang Chung Yan 鄧頌恩; 398709	Permanent prisoner for killing his stepfather who raped his younger sister Admission in prison on September 6, 2013(shown in Episode 1); Originally received an offer from the Faculty of Law in the University of Hong Kong; Brother of Cheng Ho Yi.
Quinn Ho	Yu Shun Chiu 于順潮; 368780	Permanent prisoner for murder that he killed a security guard while he robbed a bank three years ago Both his wife and son had been diagnosed with long-term disease that he needed money for medicine, and he has later been found out that he make money secretly by helping other prisoners to tailored their prisoner uniforms to made them fit.
Ricky Wong	Poon Tai Shing 潘大成; 396933	Permanent prisoner for murder He usually managed gambling facilities in prison but later has been found out by the prison staff.
Yu Chi Ming	Lau Shek Ching 劉石清; 297558	Known as Uncle Ching (清叔); Elderly permanent prisoner for murder He has been jailed for over 20 years.
Chan Wing Chun	Ho Pak Wun 何百雲; 258779	Elderly permanent prisoner convicted for murder which killed three women by rape He was found out that he was the man who sexually assaulted Yiu Ngoi Ka 20 years ago.
Eddie Pang	Wong Wai Chuen 黃偉全; 384360	Permanent prisoner convicted for murder in Stanley Prison.
Tse Kwong Yiu	Lee Kwok-wing 李國榮; 387659	Prisoner convicted for drug trafficking and has been jailed for 25 years.
Chan Min Leung	Tien Wai-yip 田偉業; 362896	Elderly prisoner convicted for manslaughter and has been jailed for 20 years.
Chiu Lok Yin	Lam Kai Yan 林繼仁; 379006	Prisoner jailed for 20 years of manslaughter He was later found out that he has gambling debts with Poon, so he drink shampoo that he can sent to Siu Lam Psychiatric Centre for further treatments.
Winston Tsang	Wong Wing Piu 王永彪; 387955	Prisoner in Stanley Prison, convicted for manslaughter and has been jailed for 15 years. He was discovered by the prison staff that his uniform has been fitted by someone secretly.
Milkson Fong	Ng Kwok Yung 伍國勇; 309887	Prisoner who's in-charge of prison's kitchen so he was later found out that he supplying illegal food ingredients in the prisoners' meals.
June Chan	Tam Yuet King, Theresa 譚月瓊	Prisoner
Fanny Ip	Tsang Pui Hung 曾佩紅; 369249	Prisoner
Chuk Man Kwan		
Lily Lee		
So Lai Ming		
Kerry Chan		
Tina Shek		
Poon Chi Man		
Suet Ni		
KK Cheung		
Matthew Ko		
Hugo Wong		
Kitterick Yiu		
Otto Chan		
Kenny Chan		
Calvin Chan		
Parkman Wong		
Nathan Ngai		
Alan Wan		
Vin Choi		
Ho Chun Hin		
Ares Li		
Kanice Lau		
Janice Shum		
Candice Chiu		
Ip Ting Chi		
Joan Lee		
Kimmi Tsui		
Ngai Wai Man		
Brian Chiu		
Coey Cheung		
Christy Chan		
Clayton Li		
Mark Ma		
Vincent Wong Wing San		
Cheng Ka Ho		
James Wong		
Fan Chung Hang		
Terrence Huang		
Gogo Cheung		
Even Chan		
Jenny Wong		
King Lam		
Kelvin Yuen		
Lily Liu		
Yu Ying Tung		
Shally Tsang		
Kathy Fung		
Emily Chung		
Camy Ting		

=== Others ===
Cast	Role	Description
Josie Ho	Ting Ho Ho 丁好好; 336145	Prisoner for six years by manslaughter a man Have a crippled leg Imprisoned from October 28, 2009; Released from prison in Episode 11; Mother of Ting Ngai-hang (丁毅恆); Love interest of Kiu Ching Kiu
Jade Leung	Ally Yip Nga Lui 葉雅蕾	Man Seung Shing's ex-wife She was sent to jail for dangerous driving at the end of the drama.
Ram Chiang	Cheng On-dik 鄭安迪	Ngoi Ka's uncle Seung Shing's best friend
Harriet Yeung	Ku Wai Chu 顧惠珠	Prisoner; Has a crush on Yiu Ngoi Ka
Pal Sinn	Yip Sai Heung 葉細響; 393774	He was the main antagonist of the drama Permanent prisoner for six counts of murder, including policemen, women and children Admission in prison on May 6, 2012 (shown in Episode 1); He instigated Lau Chong Kwan, who currently the boss of a triad group to attack his rival, Man Sheung Sing and Yiu Ngoi Ka in episode 5.
Wai Ka Hung	To Tsz Shu 杜子書; 2867	He was jailed for murder since he was 16, and has been jailed for over 30 years. He has studied very hard in prison and was received the Master's degree of Philosophy of the Open University of Hong Kong.
Yeung Chiu Hoi	Tang Chung Yan 鄧頌恩; 398709	Permanent prisoner for killing his stepfather who raped his younger sister Admission in prison on September 6, 2013(shown in Episode 1); Originally received an offer from the Faculty of Law in the University of Hong Kong; Brother of Cheng Ho Yi.
Quinn Ho	Yu Shun Chiu 于順潮; 368780	Permanent prisoner for murder that he killed a security guard while he robbed a bank three years ago Both his wife and son had been diagnosed with long-term disease that he needed money for medicine, and he has later been found out that he make money secretly by helping other prisoners to tailored their prisoner uniforms to made them fit.
Ricky Wong	Poon Tai Shing 潘大成; 396933	Permanent prisoner for murder He usually managed gambling facilities in prison but later has been found out by the prison staff.
Yu Chi Ming	Lau Shek Ching 劉石清; 297558	Known as Uncle Ching (清叔); Elderly permanent prisoner for murder He has been jailed for over 20 years.
Chan Wing Chun	Ho Pak Wun 何百雲; 258779	Elderly permanent prisoner for killed three women by rape He was found out that he was the man who sexually assaulted Yiu Ngoi Ka 20 years ago.
Eddie Pang	Wong Wai Chuen 黃偉全; 384360	Permanent prisoner for murder
Tse Kwong Yiu	Lee Kwok-wing 李國榮; 387659	Prisoner jailed for 25 years of drug trafficking
Chan Min Leung	Tien Wai-yip 田偉業; 362896	Elderly prisoner jailed for 20 years of manslaughter
Chiu Lok Yin	Lam Kai Yan 林繼仁; 379006	Prisoner jailed for 20 years of manslaughter He was later found out that he has gambling debts with Poon, so he drink shampoo that he can sent to Siu Lam Psychiatric Centre for further treatments.
Milkson Fong	Ng Kwok Yung 伍國勇; 309887	Prisoner who's in-charge of prison's kitchen so he was later found out that he supplying illegal food ingredients in the prisoners' meals.
Eileen Yeow		
Caret Cheung		
Jonathan Wong	Wong Siu Hin 王小軒	Correctional Officer Trainee
June Chan	Tam Yuet King, Theresa 譚月瓊	Prisoner
Fanny Ip	Tsang Pui Hung 曾佩紅; 369249	Prisoner
Chuk Man Kwan		
Lily Lee		
So Lai Ming		
Kerry Chan		
Tina Shek		
Poon Chi Man		
Suet Ni		
KK Cheung		
Matthew Ko		
Hugo Wong		
Kitterick Yiu		
Otto Chan		
Kenny Chan		
Calvin Chan		
Parkman Wong		
Nathan Ngai		
Alan Wan		
Vin Choi		
Ho Chun Hin		
Ares Li		
Kanice Lau		
Janice Shum		
Candice Chiu		
Ip Ting Chi		
Joan Lee		
Kimmi Tsui		
Ngai Wai Man		
Brian Chiu		
Coey Cheung		
Christy Chan		
Clayton Li		
Mark Ma		
Vincent Wong Wing San		
Cheng Ka Ho		
James Wong		
Fan Chung Hang		
Terrence Huang		
Gogo Cheung		
Even Chan		
Jenny Wong		
King Lam		
Window Tsang		
Kelvin Yuen		
Lily Liu		
Yu Ying Tung		
Shally Tsang		
Kathy Fung		
Emily Chung		
Camy Ting		
