= Smooth Talker =

Hong Kong TV series

- Official poster
- Also known as: Harmony Is Precious
- 以和為貴
- Genre: Modern, Comedy
- Created by: Hong Kong Television Broadcasts Limited
- Written by: Tong Gin-ping, Cheung Ying-wai, Tsui Lok-ci, Lau Chi-hun, Wong Sau-ching
- Starring: Joe Ma; Kate Tsui; Johnson Lee; Elena Kong; Tommy Wong; Tracy Chu
- Theme music composer: Alan Cheung
- Opening theme: "出口" Way Out by Justin Lo & Johnson Lee
- Country of origin: Hong Kong
- Original language: Cantonese
- No. of episodes: 20

Production
- Executive producer: Catherine Tsang
- Producer: Lam Chi-wah
- Production location: Hong Kong
- Editor: Ng Lap-gwong
- Camera setup: Multi camera
- Running time: 45 minutes (per episode)
- Production company: TVB

Original release
- Network: TVB Jade, HD Jade
- Release: 30 March – 24 April 2015

Related
- Eye In The Sky; The Empresses of China

Smooth Talker
- Chinese: 以和為貴
- Literal meaning: "Harmony Is Precious"
Transcriptions
Standard Mandarin
- Hanyu Pinyin: Yǐ Hé Wéi Guì
Yue: Cantonese
- Yale Romanization: Yíh Wòh Wàih Gwai
- Jyutping: Ji5 Wo4 Wai4 Gwai3

Smooth Talker (Chinese: 以和為貴; Jyutping: Ji5 Wo4 Wai4 Gwai3; Cantonese Yale: Yíh Wòh Wàih Gwai; literally "Harmony Is Precious") is a 2015 Hong Kong romantic comedy television drama created and produced by TVB, starring Joe Ma and Kate Tsui as the main leads, with Johnson Lee, Elena Kong, Tommy Wong and Tracy Chu in main supporting roles. Filming took place from Augusts till November 2014. The drama aired on Hong Kong's Jade and HD Jade channels March 30 till April 24, 2015 every Monday through Friday during its 9:30-10:30 pm timeslot with a total of 20 episodes.

== Synopsis ==
Hau Tak-sze (Joe Ma) has inherited his late father's social club, besides managing the club he also works full-time as a court mediator. He meets Mo Sui-yee (Kate Tsui), who is in the process of divorcing her cheating ex-husband, during one of his cases. Sui-yee moves into her cousin Lam Ah-lui's (Elena Kong) home during her divorce, she soon finds out that her ex-husband's lover also lives in the same building as her cousin. Since Tak-sze visits the building frequently Sui-yee thinks both him and her ex-husband's lover are in cohorts together to try to gain her property from her divorce.

Mo Sui-yee gets a job at Au Yeung-ai's (Johnson Lee) law office, Tak-sze also visits the law office frequently because he is best friends with Yeung-ai. Through her boss and new job, Sui-yee learns that Tak-sze is truly a nice guy who works hard at his job.

== Cast ==
=== Main cast ===
- Joe Ma as Hau Tak-sze (侯德仕), Pronunciation similar as "So many things" or "Busy for the extra" and "Toast".
- Kate Tsui as Mo Sui-yee (巫瑞薏), Pronunciation same as "Sleepless"
- Johnson Lee as Au Yeung-ai (歐陽繼)
- Elena Kong as Lam Ah-lui (林亞磊)

=== Supporting cast ===
- Tommy Wong as Au Yeung-bin (歐陽邊)
- Tracy Chu as Mo Sui-ka (巫瑞嘉)
- Jacqueline Wong as Angie Hu (胡姿柏; Wu Zi-baak)
- Nathan Ngai as Jason Wong (黃柱樑; Wong Cyu-loeng)
- Quinn Ho as Yau Sai-wu (游西湖), Pronunciation same as "Travel around Xihu"
- William Chak as Chung Kwok-wai (鍾國威), Pronunciation same as "China is very powerful"
- Eddie Pang *Peng Huaian as Che Ming-zan (車鳴震), Pronunciation similar as "Che Chan", which means having sex in car.
- Joe Junior as Mak Ming-ming (麥明明), Pronunciation similar as Hong Kong's famous female Feng-shui Specialist Mak Ling Ling.
- Carat Cheung as Betty So (蘇花兒; Sou Faa-ji), Pronunciation same as "coquettish flower", the really means in Chinese would be Slut
- Stefan Wong as Wan Siu-lung (溫少龍), Pronunciation similar as Less making money in Cantonese Slang.
- Raymond Chiu as Wan Tin-gong (尹天江), Pronunciation similar as Finding something a whole day.
- Pat Poon as Wu Gwai-wing (胡貴榮)
- Patrick Dunn as David Lee (李明達; Lei Ming-Daat)
- Hugo Wong as Wu Ming-gei (胡銘基)
- Shally Tsang as Wat Wong Ming-chu (屈黃明珠)
- Chloe Nguyen (阮兒) as Tong Jeoi (唐蕊)
- Jack Hui as Gwai Tau-ying (鬼頭鷹)
- MoMo Wu as Lai Lee Chi-chun (賴李至珍)
- Eileen Yeow as Wu Yiu Bik-san (胡姚碧珊)
- Suet Nei as Chung Yan-giu (鍾欣嬌)
- Rocky Cheng as Bei Yuen-fat (費潤發)
- Sam Tsang as Buk Chi-tou (卜智濤)
- Yu Chi Ming as Lee Yut-suan (李乙迅)
- Alan Mak as Ngai Bak-ho (倪柏豪)
- Even Chan as Ga Sau-man (賈秀文)
- King Kong Lam as Yan Chi-chung (甄子聰)
- Ngai Wai Man as Wong Ging (黃勁)
- Otto Wong as Dai Din (大癲)
- Ocean Wong as Wu Ming-fung (胡銘鋒)
- Jimmy Au as Hau Ye (侯爺)
- Chan Dick Hark as Ngan Gin-sheh (眼鏡蛇)
- Leo Tsang as Wah Suk (華叔)
- Man Yeung as

=== Cameo appearance ===
- Rebecca Zhu

== Development ==
TVB 2015 calendar, month of May. From clockwise top left to right: Kate Tsui, Joe Ma, Johnson Lee, Elena Kong.

- A promo image of Smooth Talker was featured in TVB's 2015 calendar for the month of May.
- The costume fitting ceremony was held on August 26, 2014 12:30 pm at Tseung Kwan O TVB City Studio One.
- The plot for Smooth Talker was first unveiled at "TVB Sales Presentation 2015" held in November 2014.
- Filming of the drama began in August 2014 and ended in November 2014.
- In October 2014 co-star Tracy Chu suffered a heat stroke during the midst of filming.

== Viewership ratings ==
#	Timeslot (HKT)	Week	Episode(s)	Average points	Peaking points
1	Mon – Fri 21:30	30 March - 3 April 2015	1 — 5	25	--
2	Mon – Fri 21:30	06-10 April 2015	6 — 10	25	28
3	Mon – Fri 21:30	13–17 April 2015	11 — 15	25	27
4	Mon – Fri 21:30	20–24 April 2015	16 — 20	25	--
Total average				25	28

== Awards and nominations ==
Year	Ceremony	Category	Nominee	Result
2015	StarHub TVB Awards	My Favourite TVB Actress	Kate Tsui	Nominated
2015	StarHub TVB Awards	My Favourite TVB Supporting Actress	Elena Kong	Nominated
2015	StarHub TVB Awards	My Favourite TVB Female TV Character	Kate Tsui	Nominated
2015	StarHub TVB Awards	My Favourite TVB Female TV Character	Elena Kong	Nominated
2015	TVB Star Awards Malaysia	My Favourite TVB Actress in a Leading Role	Kate Tsui	Nominated
2015	TVB Star Awards Malaysia	My Favourite TVB Actress in a Supporting Role	Elena Kong	Nominated
2015	TVB Star Awards Malaysia	My Favourite TVB On-Screen Couple	Johnson Lee & Elena Kong	Nominated
2015	TVB Anniversary Awards	TVB Anniversary Award for Best Drama	Smooth Talker	Nominated
2015	TVB Anniversary Awards	TVB Anniversary Award for Best Actor	Joe Ma	Nominated
2015	TVB Anniversary Awards	TVB Anniversary Award for Best Actress	Kate Tsui	Nominated
2015	TVB Anniversary Awards	TVB Anniversary Award for Best Actress	Elena Kong	Nominated
2015	TVB Anniversary Awards	TVB Anniversary Award for Best Supporting Actor	Tommy Wong	Nominated
2015	TVB Anniversary Awards	TVB Anniversary Award for Favourite Drama Song	Way Out (出口) by Justin Lo & Johnson Lee	Nominated

== International Broadcast ==
- Malaysia - 8TV (Malaysia), 10 February 2017
