= TVB Fadans =

Hong Kong television actresses

The term TVB "fadan" (花旦) is used to describe the most popular and highest paid actresses at Hong Kong television station, TVB. This term was first coined in the 1970s with the first group of fadans, Louise Lee, Liza Wang, Gigi Wong, and Angie Chiu

== 1970s to 1980s ==
The first four were the most popular and highest paid actresses at TVB during the 1970s and the 1980s.

- Louise Lee
- Liza Wang
- Gigi Wong
- Angie Chiu

== 1980s to 1990s ==
- Maggie Cheung
- Dodo Cheng
- Margie Tsang
- Carina Lau
- Yammie Nam
- Kitty Lai

Other Fadans:

- Sheren Tang
- Kathy Chow
- Rebecca Chan
- Barbara Yung
- Jaime Chik

== Early 1990s ==
- Esther Kwan
- Maggie Shiu
- Amy Kwok
- Adia Chan

Other Fadans

- Noel Leung
- Fiona Leung

== Mid-1990s to Mid-2000s ==
- Jessica Hsuan
- Maggie Cheung Ho-yee
- Ada Choi
- Flora Chan
- Kenix Kwok

Other Fadans:

- Gigi Lai
- Charmaine Sheh
- Michelle Ye
- Sonija Kwok
- Mariane Chan
- Anne Heung
- Christine Ng
- Louisa So
- Melissa Ng
- Yoyo Mung
- Joyce Tang

== Mid-2000s to Mid-2010s ==
- Tavia Yeung
- Myolie Wu
- Linda Chung
- Kate Tsui
- Fala Chen

Other Fadans:

- Shirley Yeung
- Nancy Wu
- Selena Lee
- Aimee Chan
- Sharon Chan
- Natalie Tong
- Bernice Liu
- Leila Tong

== Next-Gen Fadans ==
In 2013, the Hong Kong media chose Rebecca Zhu and Kelly Fu as the first two actresses that would lead the next generation of fadan actresses. Since then, many new actresses have emerged and competition for the "fadan" title is stiff.

=== Mandy Wong ===
On this list, Mandy Wong has the most acting credits and experience. Wong began her television and acting career with her participation in the Miss Hong Kong 2007 beauty pageant. She achieved wider fame through her major supporting roles in the 2010 drama Suspects in Love.

In 2012, Wong gained recognition by receiving the Most Improved Female Artiste award at the annual TVB Anniversary Awards as well as the Favorite Promising Actress award at the My AOD Favourites Award for her performance in the dramas L'Escargot, The Hippocratic Crush, Tiger Cubs and Divas in Distress. Since then, she has regularly received nominations at the TVB Anniversary Awards, TVB Star Awards Malaysia and StarHub TVB Awards.

With the 2013 sequel The Hippocratic Crush II, Wong received the Most Improved Female Artiste award at the StarHub TVB Awards as well as the Favourite TVB Drama Character at the TVB Star Awards Malaysia.

In 2015, Wong played her first female leading role in the drama The Fixer, garnering her first Best Actress nomination at the TVB Anniversary Awards and receiving Favourite TVB Drama Character again at the TVB Star Awards Malaysia.

In 2016, Wong's performance in the drama Law dis-Order garnered her various nominations. At the StarHub TVB Awards, she received the My Favourite TVB Female Character award again and garnered her first nomination for My Favourite TVB Actress. At the TVB Star Awards Malaysia, she received the My Favourite TVB Drama Character award again and garnered her first nomination for Favorite TVB Actress, eventually being placed among top 5.

In 2017, Wong starred as the first female lead in two dramas, Nothing Special Force and The Exorcist's Meter. For the drama Nothing Special Force, Wong won the My Favourite TVB Female Character award again. For the critical acclaimed supernatural drama The Exorcist's Meter, she was nominated for Most Popular Female Character at the TVB Anniversary Awards and was placed among top 5.

In 2018, Wong earned critical acclaim in the legal comedy Threesome, receiving Favourite TVB Actress awards in both Singapore and Malaysia at the TVB 51st Anniversary Gala. She was also nominated for Best Actress and Most Popular Female Character at the TVB Anniversary Awards, eventually being placed among top 5 in both categories.

On 1 December 2023, Wong announced her departure from TVB.

=== Ali Lee ===
Ali Lee first gained recognition in 2014 with her villainous role in the drama Overachievers. In 2015, she starred in the dramas Raising the Bar, My "Spiritual" Ex-Lover and Under the Veil, garnering her first nominations for TVB Anniversary Award for Most Improved Female Artiste and TVB Star Awards Malaysia for Favourite TVB Most Improved Female Artiste. With her role in My "Spiritual" Ex-Lover, Lee earned her first TVB Anniversary Awards for Best Supporting Actress nomination as well.

In 2016, Lee continued to build up her growing resume in the dramas Fashion War, Brother's Keeper II and Law dis-Order. With her performance that year, she received the Most Improved Female Artiste awards at both the StarHub TVB Awards and the TVB Anniversary Awards.

In 2017, Lee received My Favourite TVB Actress award at the StarHub TVB Awards with her role in the drama Legal Mavericks. With the drama My Ages Apart, she earned her first nominations for Best Actress and Most Popular Female Character at the TVB Anniversary Awards, eventually being placed among top 5 in both categories.

In 2018, Lee earned critical acclaim with her performance in the family drama Who Wants A Baby? and received the Best Actress award at the TVB Anniversary Awards.

=== Priscilla Wong ===
Priscilla Wong joined TVB in 2013 and her first female leading role was in the drama Karma Rider, garnered her first nomination for the TVB Anniversary Awards for Most Improved Female Artiste. In 2014, Wong received the Most Improved Female Artiste award at the TVB Anniversary Awards with her performance in the drama Swipe Tap Love. She was also nominated for the TVB Anniversary Award for Best Actress for the first time.

In 2015, Wong gained popularity in the drama Madam Cutie on Duty, receiving the TVB Anniversary Award for Best On-Screen Partnership with Edwin Siu. In 2016, she once again received attention in the drama Two Steps from Heaven, eventually being placed among top 5 for the TVB Anniversary Award for Best Actress. With the 2017 drama Line Walker: The Prelude, Wong received the TVB Star Awards Malaysia for My Favourite TVB Drama Characters award.

=== Sisley Choi ===
Sisley Choi first gained recognition as the first runner-up at Miss Hong Kong 2013. She made her acting debut in the 2014 drama Overachievers. In 2015, Choi got her first female leading role in the drama Young Charioteers. She garnered her first nominations for the TVB Star Awards Malaysia for Favourite Most Improved Female Artiste and TVB Anniversary Awards for Best Actress.

In 2016, Choi was nominated for TVB Anniversary Awards for Best Actress with the drama Speed of Life. With the drama Presumed Accidents, she received the TVB Star Awards Malaysia for Favourite TVB Drama Character award.

In 2017, Choi received the Most Popular Female Character award at the TVB Anniversary Awards with her role in the drama Legal Mavericks. She received the Best Actress award with the same role in the sequel Legal Mavericks 2020 at the TVB Anniversary Awards.

=== Kelly Fu ===
In 2013, Kelly Fu had her breakthrough in the popular TVB drama sequel to the hit 2003 drama, Triumph in the Skies II. That year, the Hong Kong media chose Rebecca Zhu and Kelly Fu as the first two actresses that would lead the next generation of fadan actresses.

In 2015, Fu gained recognition for starring in the popular TVB drama, Captain of Destiny, receiving her first Best Supporting Actress nomination at the TVB Anniversary Awards.

In 2017, Fu took on her first female leading role in the drama May Fortune Smile On You. With her role in the drama Burning Hands, she garnered her first nomination at the StarHub TVB Awards for My Favourite Supporting Actress. With the drama Married But Available, she received a nomination for the TVB Anniversary Award for Best Supporting Actress.

In 2018, Fu starred in the drama Stuntman as the second female lead, earning her first nominations for Favorite TVB Actress in both Malaysia and Singapore at the 51st Anniversary Gala.

=== Grace Chan ===
Grace Chan first gained recognition after receiving the titles of Miss Hong Kong 2013 and Miss Chinese International 2014. She made her acting debut in the 2014 drama, Overachievers, garnering her first nominations for the TVB Anniversary Award for Most Improved Female Artiste and Best Supporting Actress.

In 2015, Chan starred as the female lead in the dramas Raising the Bar and Captain of Destiny. At the TVB Anniversary Awards, she received the Most Improved Female Artiste award and was nominated for Best Actress for the first time with her performance in Raising the Bar. At the StarHub TVB Awards, Chan earned her first nominations for Favourite TVB Actress, Favourite TVB Female TV Characters, Favourite Onscreen Couple (with Louis Cheung) with Raising the Bar, and received the Best New Artiste award with Captain of Destiny. At the TVB Star Awards Malaysia, she earned her first nominations for Favourite TVB Actress and Favourite Onscreen Couple (with Louis Cheung) with Raising the Bar as well as Favourite Most Improved Female Artiste.

In 2016, Chan received the Favourite TVB Drama Characters award at the TVB Star Awards Malaysia with the drama Blue Veins.

Chan has not filmed any TV dramas after 2018, but she occasionally hosts TV programmes and guests in public events.

=== Eliza Sam ===
Eliza Sam first gained recognition after being crowned Miss Chinese International in 2010. She made her acting debut in 2012 with the dramas Ghetto Justice II, Divas in Distress and The Confidant. Sam garnered nomination at the TVB Anniversary Award for Most Improved Female Artiste that year. She received the same award for her performance in the 2013 dramas Inbound Troubles, Triumph in the Skies II, Sniper Standoff and The Hippocratic Crush II.

In 2015, Sam received the My Favourite TVB Female TV Character award at the StarHub TVB Awards with her role in the drama Under the Veil. In 2016, she received My Favourite TVB Drama Character award at the TVB Star Awards Malaysia with her role in the drama My Dangerous Mafia Retirement Plan.

In 2018, Sam's contract with TVB ended and she gradually stepped away from the entertainment industry.

=== Tracy Chu ===
Tracy Chu debuted in the industry through the Miss Hong Kong Pageant in 2012, finishing as the 2nd runner-up. Her first role was in the high-profile medical drama The Hippocratic Crush II. In 2014, Chu had a supporting role in the drama Tomorrow Is Another Day, garnering nominations for My Favourite Supporting Actress and Most Improved Female Artiste at the StarHub TVB Awards as well as a Favourite Promising Female Artiste nomination at the TVB Star Awards Malaysia.

In 2015, Chu had supporting roles in the dramas Smooth Talker and The Fixer, garnering nominations for Most Improved Female Artiste at the TVB Anniversary Awards, the TVB Star Awards Malaysia, and the StarHub TVB Awards. At the TVB Anniversary Awards and the TVB Star Awards Malaysia, she was nominated Best Supporting Actress with her performance in The Fixer.

In 2016, Chu took on her first female leading role in the drama Over Run Over, earning positive reviews. At the StarHub TVB Awards, she received My Favourite Female TV Characters award and garnered nomination for My Favourite TVB Actress. At the TVB Star Awards Malaysia, she received the Favourite On-Screen Couple award (with Vincent Wong) and was nominated for Favourite TVB Actress, and Favourite TVB Drama Characters. At the TVB Anniversary Awards, Chu received the Most Popular On-Screen Partnership award with Wong. She was nominated for Best Actress and Most Popular Female Character, eventually being placed among top 5 in both categories.

In 2017, Chu had a supporting role in the drama Legal Mavericks. She received nominations at the StarHub TVB Awards in the categories of Favourite Supporting Actress and Favourite Female TV Characters.

As she pursues her career in law, Chu gradually stepped away from the entertainment industry and has become a barrister since 2020.

=== Grace Wong ===
Grace Wong first gained recognition at the Miss Hong Kong 2007 pageant, placing within the top fifteen and signing with TVB in 2007. She also held the title of 1st runner up, Miss Photogenic, and Miss International Goodwill at the Miss Hong Kong 2007 pageant. In 2013, Wong garnered her first TVB Anniversary Award nomination for Most Improved Female Artiste with her supporting roles in the dramas Friendly Fire, Sergeant Tabloid, Awfully Lawful, The Hippocratic Crush II and Bounty Lady.

In 2016, Wong gained recognition in the critical acclaimed martial art drama A Fist Within Four Walls. At the TVB Anniversary Awards, Wong received the Most Popular Female Character award and was nominated for Best Supporting Actress. At the TVB Star Awards Malaysia, she received the Favourite TVB Drama Characters and Favourite TVB On-Screen Couple (with Benjamin Yuen) awards, as well as being nominated for Favourite TVB Supporting Actress. At the StarHub TVB Awards, she received both My Favourite TVB Female TV Characters and My Favourite TVB On-Screen Couple (with Benjamin Yuen) awards.

In 2017, Wong earned her first nomination for TVB Anniversary Awards for Best Actress with the drama A General, a Scholar and a Eunuch.

In 2021, Wong's contract with TVB had ended and she decided not to renew her contract.

=== Others ===
- Katy Kung
- Samantha Ko
- Rosina Lam
- Rebecca Zhu
- Jeannie Chan
- Moon Lau
