= 2015 TVB Star Awards Malaysia =

- Date: 28 November 2015
- Location: Arena of Stars

Television/radio coverage
- Network: Astro Wah Lai Toi, TVB Entertainment News
- Produced by: TVB Entertainment News

The 2015 TVB Star Awards Malaysia (simplified Chinese: TVB 马来西亚星光荟萃颁奖典礼2015; traditional Chinese: TVB 馬來西亞星光薈萃頒獎典禮2015), presented by TVB Entertainment News, Astro, MY FM, and MELODY FM in Malaysia, is an awards ceremony that recognises the best Hong Kong TVB television programmes that aired on Malaysia's Astro On Demand and Astro Wah Lai Toi in 2015. It was held on 28 November 2015 at Arena of Stars in Genting Highlands, Pahang, Malaysia, and was broadcast live through Malaysia's Astro Wah Lai Toi and Hong Kong's TVB Entertainment news channel.

The awards ceremony was officially announced on 13 October 2015, and presented 13 nomination categories. Nominees were announced on 16 October through a mobile app for Android. The Malaysian public are able to vote for their favourite stars by casting votes on the app. The voting period lasted from 16 October to 21 November 2015.

Captain of Destiny won six awards, including My Favourite TVB Drama and My Favourite Actor (Ruco Chan). Kristal Tin and Nancy Wu were both tied for My Favourite TVB Actress, making it the first year in which two Best Actress awards were given out.

== Winners and nominees ==
Top 3 nominations are listed first and in bold face.

=== Programs ===
My Favourite TVB Drama Series	My Favourite TVB Drama Theme Song
**Captain of Destiny**; **Limelight Years**; **Lord of Shanghai**; Raising the Bar; Young Charioteers; Eye In the Sky; Ghost of Relativity; The Fixer; Every Step You Take; Momentary Lapse of Reason; Under the Veil; With or Without You	**"Sailing" (扬帆) from Captain of Destiny – performed by Fred Cheng**; "You & Me" (我和你) from Raising the Bar – performed by Stephanie Ho; "The Beautiful Time" (美好的时光) from Young Charioteers – performed by Jinny Ng; "Truth" (真相) from Eye In the Sky – performed by Alfred Hui and Hubert Wu; "Regretless" (岁月无悔) from Lord of Shanghai – performed by Alfred Hui
My Favourite TVB Variety Program	My Favourite TVB Enrichment Program
**Sze U Tonight**; Sunday Songbird; Helen To-kyo!; Chef Minor 2; Four Amigos Bon Voyage	**Wellness On the Go 3**; Am I Healthy?; All Things Girl – Malaysia Chapter; Not Far But Away; Big Big World 2

=== Acting and hosting ===
My Favourite TVB Actor in a Leading Role	My Favourite TVB Actress in a Leading Role
**Ruco Chan – Captain of Destiny as Man-ho, the Eleventh Prince**; **Louis Cheung – Momentary Lapse of Reason as Kam Wah**; **Tony Hung – Captain of Destiny as Cheung Po Tsai**; Johnson Lee – Officer Geomancer as Sit Dan-yan; Edwin Siu – Madam Cutie On Duty as Law Dai-shu; Ben Wong – Raising the Bar as Marcus Fan Chi-ngai; Him Law – Young Charioteers as Jedi Yau Dat; Kevin Cheng – Eye In the Sky as Szeto Shun; Damian Lau – Limelight Years as Ben Law Ban-hon; Moses Chan – Ghost of Relativity as Michael Mai Hoi-long; Bobby Au-yeung – With or Without You as So Tung-bor; Anthony Wong – Lord of Shanghai as Kiu Ngo-tin; Kent Tong – Lord of Shanghai as Chak Kam-tong; Wayne Lai – Lord of Shanghai as Kung Siu-shan	**Kristal Tin – Ghost of Relativity as May Suen Suk-mui** ‡; **Nancy Wu – Ghost of Relativity as Gin Keung Yung** ‡; **Linda Chung – Limelight Years as Szeto Tik-tik**; Priscilla Wong – Madam Cutie On Duty as Apple Fa Ping; Grace Chan – Raising the Bar as Giselle Tong Ching-chi; Nancy Sit – My "Spiritual" Ex-Lover as Nip Siu-sin; Kate Tsui – Smooth Talker as Mo Sui-yee; Liza Wang – Limelight Years as Wah Fong-ying; Selena Li – Brick Slaves as Cecilia Choi Kin-ching; Myolie Wu – Every Step You Take as Sung Tin-chung; Tavia Yeung – Momentary Lapse of Reason as Leung Sum; Joey Meng – With or Without You as Wong Yuen-chi
My Favourite TVB Actor in a Supporting Role	My Favourite TVB Actress in a Supporting Role
**Benjamin Yuen – The Fixer as Mak Hang-chik**; **Louis Cheung – Raising the Bar as Quinton Chow Chi-pok**; **Mat Yeung – Momentary Lapse of Reason as Shum Yat-yin**; Alex Fong Lik-sun – Limelight Years as Sean Song Sheung-hang; Ngo Ka-nin – Ghost of Relativity as Charlie Chan Cha-lei; Mak Cheung-ching – Every Step You Take as Yue Ka-king; Vincent Wong – With or Without You as Chun Shiu-yau; Oscar Leung – Officer Geomancer as Leung Sing-kau; Raymond Cho – Madam Cutie On Duty as Tong Hon-si; Timothy Cheng – Raising the Bar as Duncan Yam Suen-yip; Ram Chiang – Raising the Bar as Woody Lam Sam-muk; Tony Hung – Eye In the Sky as Tai Fu-lung	**Elaine Yiu – Raising the Bar as Vivian Cheung Wai-wan**; **Elena Kong – Smooth Talker as Lam Ah-lui**; **Rosina Lam – Momentary Lapse of Reason as Fa Ying-yuet**; Natalie Tong – Lord of Shanghai as Lee Chi-ching; Vivien Yeo – Ghost of Relativity as Lolita Law Lai-fa; Eliza Sam – Brick Slaves as Peggy Suk Bik-gei; Tracy Chu – The Fixer as Mak Ping-on; Maggie Shiu – Captain of Destiny as Shek Giu; Jacqueline Wong – With or Without You as So Siu-mui; Rebecca Zhu – Officer Geomancer as Chiu Dan-ching; Mandy Wong – Madam Cutie On Duty as Hung Dan-dan; Samantha Ko – Eye In the Sky as Agatha Lam Ling; Katy Kung – Romantic Repertoire as Joe Hon Wan-yee
My Favourite TVB Most Improved Actor	My Favourite TVB Most Improved Actress
**Mat Yeung – Madam Cutie On Duty, Momentary Lapse of Reason, Every Step You Take, Captain of Destiny and Lord of Shanghai**; Hugo Wong – Madam Cutie On Duty, Raising the Bar, My "Spiritual" Ex-Lover, Smooth Talker, Limelight Years and Momentary Lapse of Reason; Owen Cheung – Romantic Repertoire, Come Home Love, Every Step You Take and Under the Veil; Quinn Ho – Smooth Talker and Come Home Love; Jonathan Cheung – Eye In the Sky, Wudang Rules, Every Step You Take and With or Without You	**Tracy Chu – Smooth Talker and The Fixer**; Grace Chan – Raising the Bar and Captain of Destiny; Sisley Choi – Officer Geomancer and Young Charioteers; Jacqueline Wong – Madam Cutie On Duty, Smooth Talker, Limelight Years and With or Without You; Candice Chiu – Raising the Bar, Limelight Years and The Fixer; Ali Lee – Raising the Bar, My "Spiritual" Ex-Lover and Under the Veil
My Favourite TVB On-Screen Couple	My Favourite TVB Host In Variety Program
**Edwin Siu and Priscilla Wong – Madam Cutie On Duty**; **Kevin Cheng and Tavia Yeung – Eye In the Sky**; **Ruco Chan and Grace Chan – Captain of Destiny**; Louis Cheung and Grace Chan – Raising the Bar; Ben Wong and Elaine Yiu – Raising the Bar; Johnson Lee and Elena Kong – Smooth Talker; Alex Fong Lik-sun and Linda Chung – Limelight Years; Moses Chan and Kristal Tin – Ghost of Relativity; Louis Cheung and Tavia Yeung – Momentary Lapse of Reason; Bobby Au-yeung and Joey Meng – With or Without You	**Johnson Lee and Pal Sinn – Sze U Tonight**; Liza Wang, Adam Cheng and Jerry Lamb – Sunday Songbird; Kitty Yuen and King Kong Lee – Neighborhood Gourmet 3; Maria Cordero and Luk Ho-ming – Good Cheap Eats 3; Gigi Wong – Eating Well with Madam Wong
My Top 16 Favourite TVB Drama Characters	TVB Star Achievement Award
Selena Li – Brick Slaves as Cecilia Choi Kin-ching; Wayne Lai – Lord of Shanghai as Kung Siu-shan; Louis Cheung – Momentary Lapse of Reason as Kam Wah; Tavia Yeung – Momentary Lapse of Reason as Leung Sum; Rosina Lam – Momentary Lapse of Reason as Fa Ying-yuet; Priscilla Wong – Madam Cutie On Duty as Apple Fa Ping; Ben Wong – Raising the Bar as Marcus Fan Chi-ngai; Elaine Yiu – Raising the Bar as Vivian Cheung Wai-wan; Benjamin Yuen – The Fixer as Mak Hang-chik; Mandy Wong – The Fixer as Lui Lui; Kristal Tin – Ghost of Relativity as May Suen Suk-mui; Nancy Wu – Ghost of Relativity as Gin Keung Yung; Him Law – Young Charioteers as Jedi Yau Dat; Ruco Chan – Captain of Destiny as Man-ho, the Eleventh Prince; Tony Hung – Captain of Destiny as Cheung Po Tsai; Linda Chung – Limelight Years as Szeto Tik-tik	Wu Fung
