= Momentary Lapse of Reason (TV series) =

Hong Kong television series

- Official poster
- Also known as: Corrupt Chinese; Against the War of Tangxi 逆戰塘西
- 收規華
- Genre: Pre-modern Drama, Crime, Action, Thriller
- Created by: Hong Kong Television Broadcasts Limited
- Directed by: Wan Chi-wai
- Starring: Tavia Yeung; Louis Cheung; Rosina Lam; Matt Yeung; Lau Kong; Timothy Cheng; Rainbow Ching; Akina Hong Wah; Joe Tay; Hugo Wong
- Theme music composer: Louis Cheung
- Opening theme: Silent Night (月無聲) by Louis Cheung
- Country of origin: Hong Kong
- Original language: Cantonese
- No. of episodes: 20

Production
- Executive producer: Catherine Tsang
- Producer: Fong Chun-chiu
- Production location: Hong Kong
- Editor: Lau Kei-wah
- Camera setup: Multi camera
- Running time: 45 minutes
- Production company: TVB

Original release
- Network: TVB Jade, HD Jade
- Release: 31 August – 20 September 2015

Related
- The Fixer; Captain of Destiny

Momentary Lapse of Reason
- Chinese: 收規華
- Literal meaning: "Corrupt Chinese"
Transcriptions
Standard Mandarin
- Hanyu Pinyin: Shōu Guī Huá
Yue: Cantonese
- Yale Romanization: Sāu Kwāi Wàh
- Jyutping: Sau1 Kwai1 Waa4

Momentary Lapse of Reason (Chinese: 收規華; Jyutping: Sau1 Kwai1 Waa4; Cantonese Yale: Sāu Kwāi Wàh; literally "The Corrupt Wah", a reference to the main character) is a 2015 Hong Kong pre-modern action crime-thriller television drama created and produced by TVB, starring Tavia Yeung, Louis Cheung, Rosina Lam and Matt Yeung as the main cast. Filming took place from November 2014 to February 2015. The drama is broadcast on Hong Kong's Jade and HD Jade channels from August 31 till September 20, 2015 airing every Monday through Sunday during its 9:30-10:30 pm timeslot with a total of 21 episodes.

== Synopsis ==
The story is a fictional telling of the history of Hong Kong during the 1930s, while Hong Kong was still under British rule.

By the 1930s Tong Sai, Hong Kong, was thriving with wealth and danger. Gambling and pornography were in huge growth, the police were corrupt, and gangs and evil businessmen ran the city. Citizens lived bitterly as the world succumbed to darkness.

The righteous Leung Sam (Tavia Yeung), a "self-combing" woman (one who vows to never marry), calls the police for help regarding a child kidnapping case. Policeman Gum Wa (Louis Cheung) was in charge of handling the case; however, Leung Sam knows that the corrupt Gum Wa would never take the case seriously as he only works for money. After encountering yet another kidnapping case, Leung Sam meets the righteous cop Sam Yat-yin (Matt Yeung). The two successfully track down the abducted children, but Gum Wa, who was doing the job for the secret prize money, was able to steal their credit by ambushing Yat-yin. Since then, Leung Sam distrusts and shames Gam Wa, and appreciates Yat-yin's sense of justice.

Leung Sam and Yat-yin had bonded together from the kidnapping case, and became even closer as he helps her find her lost relatives. At the same time, Leung Sam befriended Gum Wa as she realizes that he is not inherently bad. Gum Wa had fallen for Leung Sam, but knowing that she is self-combed, he chooses to conceal his feelings, content with just staying by her side. With the knowledge that both Leung Sam and Yat-yin have feelings for each other, Gum Wa persuades the head housemaid Mei-lan to approve of the pair, so that Leung Sam can let go of her status of a self-combed woman.

Yat-yin was framed for the death of a witness and fired from the police squad. His attitude changes as he falls into depression, and he takes to drinking to forget his woes. Gum Wa, who was actually the one responsible for the witness's death, feels guilty for his doing, and his conscience awakens from this incident. He secretly manages to get Yat-yin back his position as a cop, but Yat-yin has changed drastically: not only does he scheme his way through promotions and ranks, he also leaves behind Leung Sam for his female superintendent for benefits.

The mastermind behind the child kidnapping calls on Yat-yin and Gum Wa to form a secret alliance with the police force. With this new Yat-yin at hand, the police bureau falls into even deeper corruption, and it is up to Gum Wa to save the city...

== Cast ==
=== Main cast ===
- Tavia Yeung as Leung Sam (梁芯; homophone to conscience)

A self-combed woman who vows to never get married. She is the foster-daughter of Leung Mei-lan and Fa Ying-yuet's best friend who got conflicted in later parts of the show. She is involved in a love square with Gum Wa, Fa Ying-yuet and Sam Yat-yin.

- Louis Cheung as Gum Wa (金華; homophone to Jinhua ham)

A greedy and overconfident cop who is addicted to gambling. He likes both Leung Sam and Fa Ying-yuet. He caused Sam yat-yin's downfall. Realize his mistakes and turn back at a later parts of the show. He is involved in a love square with Sam Yat-yin, Leung Sam and Fa Ying-yuet. He is Sam Yat-yin's rival.

- Rosina Lam as Fa Ying-yuet (花影月)

A self-centered and money-loving woman. She is the best friend of Leung Sam but got conflicted. She likes Gum Wa. She is involved in a love triangle with Leung Sam and Gum Wa. She became Chong Ngou-shan's wife for the sake of money.

- Mat Yeung as Sam Yat-yin (沈一然)

An ambitious and humble cop that do things seriously and according to justice and morality. He likes Leung Sam and is involved in a love triangle with Gum Wa and Leung Sam. During later parts of the show, he will face depression and his way of thinking and his schemes change to a darker point all because of his ambitions. He dies in episode 19.

=== Maid (Ma Jie) household ===
- Rainbow Ching as Leung Mei-lan (梁美蘭)

Leung Sam's adopted / foster mother. She could be overprotective at times and she dislikes Gum Wa.

- Lily Leung as Sister Yin (燕姑)
- Lily Li as Sister Lei (麗姑)
- Ceci So as Sister Cai (齊姑)
- Kitty Lau as Sister Dung (冬姑; homophone to mushroom)
- Samantha Chuk as Sister Chow (秋姑)

=== Chong family ===
- Lau Kong as Chong Ngou-shan (莊傲山)
  - Kevin Tong as Young Zhong Ngou-shan (青年莊傲山)

A man who looks like a nice and wise guy but is a tragic and evil character inside. He manipulates Sam Yat-yin to do jobs for him. He has connection with Ng Sai-cheung in their evil deeds. Major Villain.
Sam Yat-yin's master. Father of Chong man-tou. He treats Sam Yat-yin like he was his son.

- Akina Hong Wah as Ho Wan-fong (何芸芳)

Chong Ngou Shan's assistant. She plans to take Chong Ngou-Shan's money. Villain.

- Joe Tay as Chong man-tou (莊文韜; nicknamed Eleventh Master)

Son of Chong Ngou Shan. A guy who loves to waste his father's money and to enjoy his life with women. He is jealous of Sam Yat-yin as his father treats him like a son. Villain.

- Janey Yan as Lee Yuan-ling (李婉玲)

=== Police precinct No. 7 ===
- Barry Cox as Bou Long (布朗)

The head of the police station.

- Timothy Cheng as Lui Kwok (呂國)

Secondary head of the police station. After the death of Lui Yu-wai and his mom – caused by Sam Yat-yin, he teams up with Ngou-shan to kill Sam Yat-yin and Gum Wa as a revenge. Major villain.

- Hugo Wong as Lui Yu-wai (呂耀威)

Lui Kwok's assistant. A corrupt police officer who loves to sexually harass women and desires Sam Yat-yin's downfall. He will be demoted in the later parts of the show—caused by Sam Yat-yin—and he vows to get revenge by killing Sam Yat -yin. Major villain. (Deceased – shot by Sam Yat-yin)

- Dick Chan as Uncle Choi (財叔)
- Willie Wai as Sek Gau (石九)
- Andy Lau Tin-lung as Ah Biu (阿標)
- Andy Sui as Ah Ho (阿豪)
- Kitterick Yiu as Ah Wai (阿偉)
- Gregory Lee as Ah Kit (阿杰)
- Andy Wong as Ah Yau (阿友)
- Ocean Wong as Ah Pang (阿鵬)

=== Foon Dak (Happiness Gain) brothel ===
- Au Hoi-ling as Tong Yuk-giu (唐玉嬌)
- Candy Chang as Lam Choi-dip (藍彩蝶)
- Even Chan as Cheung Mei (薔薇)
- Lucy Li as Yuk Jan-chu (玉珍珠)
- Nicole Wan as Luk Ciu (綠橋)
- Joan Lee as Chuk Yuk-hung (芍藥紅)

=== Extended cast ===
- Amy Fan
- Teresa Ha
- Yu Chi-ming
- Lily Liew
- Koo Koon-chung as Ng Sai-cheung (伍世昌)

A triad boss who secretly plans to kill Gum Wa and Sam Yat-yin. He is the mastermind behind the child kidnapping along with Lui Yu-Wa and Chong Ngou Shan. Major Villain. (Deceased - Shot by Gum Wa)

- Gary Tam
- Brian Burrell
- Vincent Lam
- Elise Suen
- Ngai Wai-man

== Development ==
- Alex Man was originally cast for the lead role.
- The title during production of the drama was "Against the War of Tangxi 逆戰塘西".
- Filming of the drama began in November 2014 and ended in February 2015.
- The costume fitting ceremony was held on November 25, 2014 at 12:30 pm Tseung Kwan O TVB City Studio One.
- The blessing ceremony took place on December 11, 2014 at 3:00 pm Tseung Kwan O TVB City Studio Thirteen.

== Viewership ratings ==
| # | Timeslot (HKT) | Week | Episode(s) | Average points | Peaking points | Note |
|---|---|---|---|---|---|---|
| 1 | Mon – Sun; 21:30–22:30 | 31 Aug – 6 Sep 2015 | 1 — 7 | 23 | 24 | Sun 20 pt |
| 2 | Mon – Sun; 21:30–22:30 | 7 – 13 Sep 2015 | 8 — 14 | 23 | -- | Sat 18 pt; Sun 21 pt |
| 3 | Mon – Sun; 21:30–22:30 | 14 – 20 Sep 2015 | 15 — 20 | 24 | 28 | Sat 20 pt; Sun 26 pt, 26 pk |
| Total average | | | | 23 | 28 | |

== International broadcast ==
| Network | Country | Airing Date | Timeslot |
|---|---|---|---|
| Astro On Demand | Malaysia | August 31, 2015 | Monday - Sunday 9:30 - 10:15 pm |
| TVBJ | Australia | September 1, 2015 | Monday - Sunday 12:30 - 1:30 am |
| Starhub TV | Singapore | December 14, 2015 | Monday – Sunday 9:00 – 10:00 pm |

== Awards and nominations ==
| Year | Ceremony | Category | Nominee | Result |
|---|---|---|---|---|
| 2015 | StarHub TVB Awards | My Favourite TVB Drama | Momentary Lapse of Reason | Nominated |
| 2015 | StarHub TVB Awards | My Favourite TVB Actor | Louis Cheung | Nominated |
| 2015 | StarHub TVB Awards | My Favourite TVB Supporting Actor | Matt Yeung | Nominated |
| 2015 | StarHub TVB Awards | My Favourite TVB Male TV Character | Louis Cheung | Won |
| 2015 | StarHub TVB Awards | My Favourite TVB Theme Song | Silent Night (月無聲) by Louis Cheung | Nominated |
| 2015 | TVB Star Awards Malaysia | My Favourite TVB Drama Series | Momentary Lapse of Reason | Nominated |
| 2015 | TVB Star Awards Malaysia | My Favourite TVB Actor in a Leading Role | Louis Cheung | Nominated |
| 2015 | TVB Star Awards Malaysia | My Favourite TVB Actress in a Leading Role | Tavia Yeung | Nominated |
| 2015 | TVB Star Awards Malaysia | My Favourite TVB Actor in a Supporting Role | Matt Yeung | Nominated |
| 2015 | TVB Star Awards Malaysia | My Favourite TVB Actress in a Supporting Role | Rosina Lam | Nominated |
| 2015 | TVB Star Awards Malaysia | My Favourite TVB On-Screen Couple | Louis Cheung & Tavia Yeung | Nominated |
| 2015 | TVB Star Awards Malaysia | My Favourite Top 16 TVB Drama Characters | Louis Cheung | Won |
| 2015 | TVB Star Awards Malaysia | My Favourite Top 16 TVB Drama Characters | Tavia Yeung | Won |
| 2015 | TVB Star Awards Malaysia | My Favourite Top 16 TVB Drama Characters | Rosina Lam | Won |
| 2015 | TVB Anniversary Awards | TVB Anniversary Award for Best Drama | Momentary Lapse of Reason | Nominated |
| 2015 | TVB Anniversary Awards | TVB Anniversary Award for Best Actor | Louis Cheung | Nominated |
| 2015 | TVB Anniversary Awards | TVB Anniversary Award for Best Actress | Tavia Yeung | Nominated |
| 2015 | TVB Anniversary Awards | TVB Anniversary Award for Best Actress | Rosina Lam | Nominated |
| 2015 | TVB Anniversary Awards | TVB Anniversary Award for Best Supporting Actor | Lau Kong | Nominated |
| 2015 | TVB Anniversary Awards | TVB Anniversary Award for Best Supporting Actor | Hugo Wong | Nominated |
| 2015 | TVB Anniversary Awards | TVB Anniversary Award for Most Popular Male Character | Louis Cheung | Nominated |
| 2015 | TVB Anniversary Awards | TVB Anniversary Award for Most Popular Male Character | Matt Yeung | Nominated |
| 2015 | TVB Anniversary Awards | TVB Anniversary Award for Most Popular Female Character | Tavia Yeung | Nominated |
| 2015 | TVB Anniversary Awards | TVB Anniversary Award for Most Popular Female Character | Rosina Lam | Nominated |
| 2015 | TVB Anniversary Awards | TVB Anniversary Award for Favourite Drama Song | Silent Night (月無聲) by Louis Cheung | Nominated |
