= Every Step You Take (TV series) =

2015 Hong Kong television series

- Official poster
- 陪著你走
- Genre: Modern, Romance
- Created by: Hong Kong Television Broadcasts Limited
- Directed by: Wan Chi-wai
- Starring: Moses Chan; Myolie Wu; Evergreen Mak; Elaine Yiu; Owen Cheung; Cilla Kung; Suet Nei; Helen Ma
- Theme music composer: Alan Cheung Ka Shing
- Opening theme: Angel (天使) by Myolie Wu
- Composer: Yeung Hei
- Country of origin: Hong Kong
- Original language: Cantonese
- No. of episodes: 20

Production
- Executive producer: Catherine Tsang
- Producer: Andy Chan Yiu Chuen
- Production location: Hong Kong
- Editor: Shek Hoi Ting
- Camera setup: Multi camera
- Running time: 45 minutes
- Production company: TVB

Original release
- Network: TVB Jade, HD Jade
- Release: 31 August – 25 September 2015

Every Step You Take
- Chinese: 陪著你走
- Literal meaning: "Walking With You"
Transcriptions
Standard Mandarin
- Hanyu Pinyin: Pei Zhuo Ni Zou
Yue: Cantonese
- Yale Romanization: Pùih Jeuhk Néih Jáu
- Jyutping: Pui4 Zoek6 Nei5 Zau2

Every Step You Take (Chinese: 陪著你走; Jyutping: Pui4 Zoek6 Nei5 Zau2; Cantonese Yale: Pùih Jeuhk Néih Jáu; literally "Walking With You") is a 2015 Hong Kong modern romance television drama created and produced by TVB, starring Moses Chan and Myolie Wu as the main cast. Filming took place from March 2014 to June 2014. The drama is broadcast on Hong Kong's Jade and HD Jade channels from August 31 till September 25, 2015 airing every Monday through Friday during its 8:30-9:30 pm timeslot with a total of 20 episodes.

== Synopsis ==
Due to an unfortunate accident, magazine photographer Sung Tin Chung (Myolie Wu) lost her ability to see. Despite her love for beauty and watching television dramas, Tin Chung was not deterred by her blindness. With the help of her boyfriend, To Ching Hang (Jonathan Cheung), and her guide dog, Tin Chung maintains her optimism and finds strength from her new motto, ‘Love Conquers All’.

While Tin Chung is slowly putting her life back together, her new neighbor and advertising guru Kam Yin Chong (Moses Chan) is suffering from a midlife crisis. A former workaholic, Yin Chong lost contact with all his friends and family. Unable to handle his behavior, even his mentee Yeun Yuen (Elaine Yiu) quits. Lost, and unable to cope with the loneliness, Yin Chong decides to take a long vacation to find his way again.

After breaking up with her boyfriend, Tin Chung crosses paths with Yin Chong and finds comfort in her lonely neighbor. Although their personalities differ vastly from the beginning, Tin Chung and Yin Chong slowly fall in love with each other and realize that they are not so different after all.

== Cast ==
=== Kam family ===
- Suet Nei as Leung Giu (梁嬌)
- Moses Chan as Kam Yin Chong (甘言重)(homophone to So Serious、 Korean actor Kim Hyun Joong)
- Helen Ma as Szeto Fei Fei (司徒菲菲)

=== Yue family ===
- Evergreen Mak as Yue Kar Ging (余加勁)
- Meini Cheung as Yue Kar Kan (余加勤)
- Yeung Ka Shing as Yue Shing Lok (余承樂)

=== 3L Advertising Company ===
- Elaine Yiu as Yuen Yuen (阮婉)
- Rachel Kan as Lam Wing (林詠)
- Brian Chu as Bernard
- Akai Lee as Calvin
- Tsang Man as Don
- Snow Suen as Emma Lo Wai Ping (勞慧萍)
- Ho Wai Yip as Anchor
- Sandy Wu
- Ip Ting Chi
- Wan Sze Pui
- Kedar Wong
- Ng Sin Tung

=== Dream Power Workshop ===
- Anderson Junior as Pak Tung Tung (白東東)
- Owen Cheung as Kam Sau Yuen (金秀玄)(original name as Kam Tung Chan (金東燦); homophone for role name to Korean Star Kim Soo Hyun、original name to Korean football player Kim Dong-chan、designed name as Leo Ku、 Fred Cheng、Eason Chan)
- Owen Ng as Chiu Ting Chun (趙廷晉)
- Mandy Lam as Ha Yat Lin (夏一蓮)
- Christy Chan as Hui Sum Yu (許芯悅)
- Calvin Chan as Jason
- Cilla Kung as Ho Na (何娜)(homophone to Korean actress Kim Ha Neul、designed name as Leo Ku's wife Lorraine、Denise Ho)
- Man Yeung as Chung (聰)
- Myolie Wu as Sung Tin Chung (宋天從)
- Mikako Leung as Wan Wan Wan (溫韻雲)

=== Extended Cast ===
- Jonathan Cheung as To Ching Hang (杜正恆)
- Jess Sum as Angela
- William Chak as Lam Chung Wai (林宗偉)
- Lily Ho as Sally (莎利)
- Chow Chung as Chong Jing (莊正)
- Joe Junior
- Tracy Ip as Bianca
- Kanice Lau as Ng Sin Lin (吳倩蓮)
- Aurora Li
- Agnes Lam

=== Special Guest ===
- Raymond Wong Ho-yin as himself
- Priscilla Wong as herself
- Tony Hung as Hung Man Ho (洪民浩) (homophone to Korean actor Lee Min Ho)

== Development ==
- The costume fitting ceremony was held on March 14, 2014 at 12:30 pm Tseung Kwan O TVB City Studio One.
- The blessing ceremony took place on April 25, 2014 at 3:00 pm Tseung Kwan O TVB City Studio Thirteen.
- Vincent Wong was originally cast in the role, To Chik Hang, but dropped out due to a schedule conflict and was replaced by Jonathan Cheung.

== Viewership ratings ==
#	Timeslot (HKT)	Week	Episode(s)	Average points	Peaking points
1	Mon – Fri; 20:30–21:30	31 Aug – 4 Sep 2015	1 — 5	23	26
2	Mon – Fri; 20:30–21:30	7 – 11 Sep 2015	6 — 10	22	25
3	Mon – Fri; 20:30–21:30	14 – 18 Sep 2015	11 — 15	22	25
4	Mon – Fri; 20:30–21:30	21 – 25 Sep 2015	16 — 20	22	25
Total average				22	26

== International broadcast ==
Network	Country	Airing Date	Timeslot
Astro On Demand	Malaysia	August 31, 2015	Monday - Friday 8:30-9:15 pm
TVBJ	Australia	September 3, 2015	Monday - Friday 7:15-8:15 pm
VV Drama	Singapore	December 24, 2015	Monday - Friday 8:00-9:00 pm

== Awards and nominations ==
Year	Ceremony	Category	Nominee	Result
2015	StarHub TVB Awards	My Favourite TVB Actor	Moses Chan	Nominated
2015	StarHub TVB Awards	My Favourite TVB Actress	Myolie Wu	Nominated
2015	StarHub TVB Awards	My Favourite TVB Male TV Character	Moses Chan	Won
2015	StarHub TVB Awards	My Favourite TVB Female TV Character	Myolie Wu	Nominated
2015	StarHub TVB Awards	My Favourite Onscreen Couple	Moses Chan & Myolie Wu	Nominated
2015	StarHub TVB Awards	My Favourite TVB Theme Song	Angel (天使) by Myolie Wu	Nominated
2015	TVB Star Awards Malaysia	My Favourite TVB Drama Series	Every Step You Take	Nominated
2015	TVB Star Awards Malaysia	My Favourite TVB Actress in a Leading Role	Myolie Wu	Nominated
2015	TVB Star Awards Malaysia	My Favourite TVB Actor in a Supporting Role	Evergreen Mak	Nominated
2015	TVB Anniversary Awards	TVB Anniversary Award for Best Drama	Every Step You Take	Nominated
2015	TVB Anniversary Awards	TVB Anniversary Award for Best Actress	Myolie Wu	Nominated
2015	TVB Anniversary Awards	TVB Anniversary Award for Best Supporting Actress	Cilla Kung	Nominated
2015	TVB Anniversary Awards	TVB Anniversary Award for Favourite Drama Song	Angel (天使) by Myolie Wu	Nominated
