= Romantic Repertoire =

Hong Kong television series

- Official poster
- Also known as: Opera Rouge
- 水髮胭脂
- Genre: Modern Drama, Romance, Comedy
- Created by: Hong Kong Television Broadcasts Limited
- Written by: Chan Chi-keung, Tam Chui-san, Ko Yee-lai, Lui Cheng-ting, Hui Ka-yiu, Ma Ching-man
- Directed by: Chan Suen-guan; Cheung Wing-ho
- Starring: Louise Lee; Moses Chan; Evergreen Mak; Joyce Koi; Katy Kung; Jason Chan
- Theme music composer: Anthony Lun
- Opening theme: Flawless (天衣無縫) by Anthony Lun ft. Joyce Koi
- Country of origin: Hong Kong
- Original language: Cantonese
- No. of episodes: 20

Production
- Executive producer: Catherine Tsang
- Producer: Lee Yim-fong
- Production location: Hong Kong
- Editors: Siu Lai-king, Wong Juk-tak
- Camera setup: Multi camera
- Running time: 45 minutes
- Production company: TVB

Original release
- Network: TVB Jade, HD Jade
- Release: 30 March – 24 April 2015

Romantic Repertoire
- Chinese: 水髮胭脂
- Literal meaning: "Opera Rouge"
Transcriptions
Standard Mandarin
- Hanyu Pinyin: Shuǐ Fà Yān Zhī
Yue: Cantonese
- Yale Romanization: Séui Faat Yīn Jī
- Jyutping: Seoi2 Faat3 Jin1 Zi1

Romantic Repertoire (Chinese: 水髮胭脂; Jyutping: Seoi2 Faat3 Jin1 Zi1; Cantonese Yale: Séui Faat Yīn Jī; literally "Opera Rouge") is a 2015 Hong Kong romantic comedy television drama created and produced by TVB, starring Louise Lee, Moses Chan, Evergreen Mak, Joyce Koi Katy Kung, and Jason Chan. Filming took place from June till September 2014. The drama aired on Hong Kong's Jade and HD Jade channels March 30 till April 24, 2015 every Monday through Friday during its 8:30-9:30 pm timeslot with a total of 20 episodes.

Romantic Repertoire is Moses Chan and Joyce Koi's first collaboration in twelve years. The two first collaborated in TVB's 2003 drama Better Halves (金牌冰人).

== Synopsis ==
Interior Designer Moon Sing-hong (Moses Chan) purchases a flat in anticipation of marrying his longtime girlfriend who is expected to be returning home soon after studying abroad. Without his knowledge or permission his older sister rents out his flat to popular Cantonese opera singer Kan Kit (Joyce Koi). Unable to break the rental lease, Sing-hong uses all kinds of tactics to try to make Kan Kit move out but her manager Lin Sau-fong (Louise Lee) helps her stand firm. When Sing-hong's best friend and business partner Tin Hak-kan (Evergreen Mak), meets Kit he develops an instant attraction to her and ask Sing-hong to help him pursue Kit. In order to help his friend with love Sing-hong gets close to Kit to find out about her interests. The two soon work out their differences and become friends. However their typical life is turned upside down when Kit gets into a car accident and finds her biological mother, while Sing-hong finds out his longtime girlfriend has been living in Hong Kong all along with another man.

== Cast ==
=== Lin family ===
- Law Lok-lam as Lin Kei-keung (連其祥)
- Louise Lee as Lin Sau-fong (連秀芳)
- Katy Kung as Joe Hon (韓允兒; Hon Wan-yee)

=== Moon family ===
- Moses Chan as Moon Sing-hong (滿承康)
- Angelina Lo as Moon Sing-oi (滿承愛)

=== Kan family ===
- Joyce Koi as Kan Kit (簡潔)
- Mary Hon as Yim Ka-lai (嚴嘉麗)

=== Tin family ===
- Evergreen Mak as Tin Hak-kan (田克勤)
- Yu Chi Ming as Tin Kam-fu (田錦富)

=== Extended cast ===
- Jason Chan as Angus Ma (馬一鳴; Maa Jat-ming)
- Susan Tse as Wan Suet-yim (溫雪艷)
- Oceane Zhu as To Chi-chin (涂紫芊)
- Akina Hong as Lau Yi-ying (劉皚瑩)
- Rosanne Lui as Leung May-wah (梁美華)
- Henry Lo as Dai Wai (戴維)
- Owen Cheung as Zero Ko (高敏俊; Kou Man-zeon)
- Mayanne Mak as Jessica Wong (王倩婷; Wong Sin-ting)
- Pat Poon as Ho Suan-yun (何信源)
- Hero Yuen as Sing Mo (成武)
- Ronald Law as Chan Han (陳鏗)
- Gary Chan as Roger
- Jack Hui as Sam
- Kitty Lau as Lee Wan-wai (李雲慧)
- Aaryn Cheung as Gan Hok-lai (靳學禮)
- Eddie Ho as Chung Bong (宗邦)
- Chan Min Leung as Lau Kau (劉球)
- Chiu Shek Man as Law Ja (羅渣)
- Koo Koon Chung as Tou Ho-kam (土豪金)
- Stephen Ho as Ko Fan (高凡)
- Suet Nei as Ko Fan's mother (高凡之母)
- Choi Kwok Hing as Mr. Sun (辛先生; Sun sensan)
- Lily Li as Sister Lei (麗姐; Lei jie)

== Development ==
- The sales presentation clip presented in October 2013 for the "2014 Sales Presentation" featured Wayne Lai in the lead actor role.
- The costume fitting ceremony was held on June 24, 2014 12:30 pm at Tseung Kwan O TVB City Studio One.
- The blessing ceremony took place on July 16, 2014 4:00 pm at Tseung Kwan O TVB City Middle Park.
- Filming of the drama began in June 2014 and ended in September 2014.

== Viewership Ratings ==
#	Timeslot (HKT)	Week	Episode(s)	Average points	Peaking points
1	Mon – Fri 20:30	30 March - 3 April 2015	1 — 5	24	--
2	Mon – Fri 20:30	06-10 April 2015	6 — 10	24	27
3	Mon – Fri 20:30	13–17 April 2015	11 — 15	24	27
4	Mon – Fri 20:30	20–24 April 2015	16 — 20	24	26
Total average				24	

== Awards and nominations ==
Year	Ceremony	Category	Nominee	Result
2015	TVB Star Awards Malaysia	My Favourite TVB Actress in a Supporting Role	Katy Kung	Nominated
2015	TVB Anniversary Awards	TVB Anniversary Award for Best Drama	Romantic Repertoire	Nominated
2015	TVB Anniversary Awards	TVB Anniversary Award for Best Supporting Actor	Jason Chan	Nominated
2015	TVB Anniversary Awards	TVB Anniversary Award for Favourite Drama Song	Flawless (天衣無縫) by Anthony Lun ft. Joyce Koi	Nominated
