= My "Spiritual" Ex-Lover =

2015 Film

- Official poster
- Also known as: Lost Beauty 倩女失魂
- 倩女喜相逢
- Genre: Period drama, Comedy, Fantasy
- Created by: Hong Kong Television Broadcasts Limited
- Written by: Cheung Sut Gok 張雪菊; Wan Kam Fung 溫淦鋒; Chung Ching Lung 鍾正龍; Yeung Wing Ying 楊詠瑩; Wong Ho Ying 王浩然
- Directed by: Yip Chun Fai 葉鎮輝
- Starring: Nancy Sit 薛家燕; Edwin Siu 蕭正楠; Joyce Tang 滕麗名; Evergreen Mak 麥長青; Angela Tong 湯盈盈; Oscar Leung 梁烈維; Jinny Ng 吳若希
- Theme music composer: Damon Chui 徐洛鏘
- Opening theme: Repay 報恩 by Nancy Sit, Edwin Siu, Evergreen Mak
- Country of origin: Hong Kong
- Original language: Cantonese
- No. of episodes: 14 (Hong Kong); 15 (America)

Production
- Producers: Chong Wai Kin 莊偉建; Yip Chan Fai 葉鎮輝
- Production location: Hong Kong
- Editor: Chan Kam Ling 陳金鈴
- Camera setup: Multi camera
- Running time: 45 minutes
- Production company: TVB

Original release
- Network: Jade; HD Jade
- Release: 9 February – 27 February 2015

Related
- Madam Cutie On Duty; Queen Divas 新抱喜相逢

My "Spiritual" Ex-Lover
- Traditional Chinese: 倩女喜相逢
- Simplified Chinese: 倩女喜相逢
- Literal meaning: "Beauty, Happy Encounter"
Transcriptions
Standard Mandarin
- Hanyu Pinyin: Qiàn Nǚ Xǐ Xiāng Féng
Yue: Cantonese
- Yale Romanization: Sin Néuih Héi Sēung Fùhng
- Jyutping: Sin3 Neoi5 Hei2 Soeng1 Fung4

My "Spiritual" Ex-Lover (Chinese: 倩女喜相逢; Jyutping: Sin3 Neoi5 Hei2 Soeng1 Fung4; Cantonese Yale: Sin Néuih Héi Sēung Fùhng; literally "Beauty, Happy Encounter") is a 2015 Hong Kong period, fantasy, comedy-drama produced by TVB. The drama is TVB's 2015 Lunar New Year drama starring most of the same cast from TVB's 2014 Lunar New Year drama Queen Divas. Filming of the drama took place from September till November 2014. The series began airing on February 9, 2015, and will be broadcast weekly from Monday to Friday on TVB Jade channel 9:30-10:30 pm timeslot.

The plot is loosely based on the fantasy story Nie Xiaoqian (Nip Siu Sin) from Pu Songling's Strange Stories from a Chinese Studio, about a poor traveling scholar who encounters a beautiful female ghost.

== Synopsis ==
Ning Choi San (Edwin Siu) is on his way to take the government official exam, along with his second older brother Ning Choi Kwan (Oscar Leung) who is with him to take the army general exam. While listening to a fellow scholar tell other scholars about his encounter with a female ghost, Choi San offends him by questioning his integrity and causes both Choi San and Choi Kwan to be thrown out of the inn they are staying at. With nowhere to stay for the night, they decide to stay at an abandoned shrine. At the shrine they encounter Nip Siu Sin (Nancy Sit) who tells them that she is a ghost. Looking at her haggard old appearance both Choi San and Choi Kwan do not believe her. Wanting to prove herself right, Siu Sin almost disintegrates from the sunlight but is saved when Choi San helps her inside the shrine. Seeing how Choi Kwan was rude to her, Siu San sabotages his examination while trying to help Choi San, who was nice to her, pass his examination. However, Siu San's plan to help Choi San backfires when she is discovered and hunted by a Taoist priest named Yin Chek Ha (Angela Tong). Choi San who was just passing by unknowingly saves Siu Sin from Chek Ha, making Siu Sin promise to be by his side until her gratitude can be repaid.

== Cast ==
=== Ghosts and spirits ===
- Nancy Sit 薛家燕 as Nip Siu Sin
  - Kaki Leung 梁嘉琪 as young Nip Siu Sin

A ghost and occupant of the abandoned Lan Yurk Temple. She survives by taking over bodies of young girls and luring young man to the abandoned shrine in order to suck their human breath.

- Ali Lee 李佳芯 as Nine-tailed Fox/Siu Nei 九尾狐/小妮

A nine-tailed fox evil spirit who is disguised as a young human female. She is believed to be killed and skinned by Yin Chek Ha.

- Kevin Tong 唐嘉麟 as Satyr Seven 七色狼

A satyr wolf evil spirit who is disguised as a human male. He is finally killed by Yin Chek Ha with "The power of love".

=== Ning family ===
- Edwin Siu 蕭正楠 as Ning Choi San 寧采臣

The over honest youngest son of the Ning family. His dream is to be a righteous and justified imperial government official, but he has failed the exam many times. He works at his love interest Ying Chun Kiu's family lantern factory as a lantern artist.

- Evergreen Mak 麥長青 as Ning Choi Man 寧采民

The oldest son of the Ning family. He is a selfish cheapskate who thinks of every possible way to save money. He works at the Ying family lantern factory as a lantern weaver.

- Henry Yu 于洋 as Ning Bing Yan 寧丙寅

The patriarch of the Ning family. Choi San, Choi Man and Choi Kwan's father. Hoping that his youngest son will one day pass the imperial official exam so that he can live a better life. He works at his daughter-in-law Ying Chun Fa's lantern factory along with his sons as a lantern weaver.

=== Ying family ===
- Joyce Tang 滕麗名 as Ying Chun Fa 迎春花

The oldest daughter and head of the Ying family. Ning Choi Kwan's wife. Due to her family not having any living males she runs the family paper lantern business called "Lucky Star Bright Shine Lanterns" and has her husband Ning Choi Kwan marry into her family taking her surname. She treats her husband badly and often verbally and physically abuses him.

- Oscar Leung 梁烈維 as Ning Choi Kwan 寧采君

The second son of the Ning family. He is a bullish person who is good at fighting. His fighting tactics are similar to Bruce Lee's. He married into his wife's family because she thought he would be an ideal husband and able to give her many sons, but he disappointed her.

- Jinny Ng 吳若希 as Ying Chun Kiu 迎春嬌

Ying Chun Fa's younger sister and Ning Choi San's love interest. She does not get along with her older sister Ying Chun Fa and desperately wants Ning Choi San to marry her so she can get away from her sister.

- Kitty Lau 劉桂芳 as Mother Chu 朱媽

Ying Chun Fa's personal maid.

- Snow Suen 孫慧雪 as Siu Wan 小環

Ying Chun Kiu's personal maid.

=== Sum Seung Si Town (心想事城) residence ===
- Angela Tong 湯盈盈 as Yin Chek Ha 燕赤霞

A Taoist priest (spiritual hunter) who was originally a male but later turned into a female by the Queen Mother. She arrives at Sum Seung Si Town looking to hunt for new evil spirits but none of the town folks believed she is legit due to her scruffy appearance.

- Ricky Fan 范振鋒 as Do Man Jun 都敏俊

Sum Seung Si Town's resident Taoist priest. A fraudulent Taoist priest who has the entire town believing him to be a real spiritual Taoist due to his appearance and the astronomical prices he charges.

- Marcus Kwok 郭田葰 as physician Chi 池大夫

Sum Seung Si Town's resident physician, The Ning and Ying family always stiff him on his house visit payments as they find ways to heal themselves once they receive his medical prescription bill.

- Eric Chung 鍾志光 as Lo Fu Chi 魯夫子

Ning Choi Kwan's academic teacher who belittles him. When he does not believe Choi Kwan is capable of writing his own name Choi Kwan beats him up.

- Ceci So 蘇恩磁 as town local 街坊

A middle age housewife who is a passerby on the streets of Sum Seung Si Town.

- Lee Hoi San 李海生 as town local 街坊

A middle-aged man who is a passerby on the streets of Sum Seung Si Town.

- MoMo Wu 吳沚默 as Young Maiden 少女

A maiden at Sum Seung Si Town who is an admirer of Do Man Jun. Both Yin Chek Ha and Do Man Jun say she is cursed and competes to heal her.

=== Bau family ===
- Anderson Junior 安德尊 as Master Yoda/Bau Sai 尤達大師/包駛

A high priest Buddhist monk living in Dou Ming Temple 導明寺. He saves Nip Siu Sin from starvation when she accidentally stumbled onto his monastery while craving for incense. He is actually the elder brother of Bau Chin and Bau Chui.

- Anderson Junior as Bau Chin 包展

A government officer who works under Ma Nou. He is the elder brother of Bau Chui and the younger brother of Master Yau Taat.

- Anderson Junior as Bau Chui 包崔

The younger brother of Master Yau Taat and Bau Chin. The husband of Yin Chek Ha. He is finally believed to be killed by Ma Nou.

=== Lucky Star Bright Shine lantern staff (福星高照) ===
- Chan Dik Hak 陳狄克
- Kelvin Chan 陳建文
- Alan Mak 麥嘉倫
- Sam Fung 馮子森
- Rocky Cheng 鄭嘉豪
- Terrence Huang 黄耀煌
- Anthony Yu 余應彤

=== Extended cast ===
- Hugo Wong 黃子恆 as Gau Gong Gak 苟宮格

A fellow scholar whose integrity is questionable due to his flirtations with the young ladies around town.

- Patrick Dunn 鄧梓峰 as Ma Nou/Cheng Ji Shing 馬瑙/鄭梓承

A senior government official who is evil and wanted to make Nip Siu Sin's spirit disappear. He is believed to be killed by a big spider spirit and his spirit disappeared because of the magic.

- Kimmy Kwan 關宛珊 as 公孫嫵姿
- Cecilia Fong 方伊琪 as Queen Mother 王母娘娘

The goddess Queen Mother. She was going to award Nip Siu Sin with human life for her good deeds but Yin Chek Ha accidentally took the award and got changed into a woman.

- Chan Min Leung 陳勉良 as Duk Koo Yat Mei 獨孤一味

An artist who lived on Piu Miu Hill 飄渺山.

- Kate Tsang 曾琬莎 as
- Winston Tsang 曾海昌 as
- Alex Yung 容天佑 as

== Development ==
- Filming took place from September till November 2014.
- The costume fitting ceremony and blessing ceremony was held on September 29, 2014, 12:30 p.m. at Tseung Kwan O TVB City Studio One Common Room.
- The original title of the drama during production was "Lost Beauty 倩女失魂".

== Viewership Ratings ==
Week	Episodes	Date	Average Points	Peaking Points
1	01－05	Feb 9-13, 2015	23	26
2	06－09	Feb 16-20, 2015	21	23
Feb 19, 2015: No episode was aired due to airing of Chinese New Year special programming.
3	10－13	Feb 23-26, 2015	24	28
Feb 27, 2015: No episode was aired due to double episode airing of Raising the Bar.
4	14 - 15	March 1, 2015	22	24
Both episode 14 and 15 was aired on a Sunday to keep on schedule with the premier of upcoming drama Eye in the Sky.
Total average			22.6	28

== Awards and nominations ==
Year	Ceremony	Category	Nominee	Result
2015	TVB Star Awards Malaysia	My Favourite TVB Actress in a Leading Role	Nancy Sit	Nominated
2015	TVB Anniversary Awards	TVB Anniversary Award for Best Drama	My "Spiritual" Ex-Lover	Nominated
2015	TVB Anniversary Awards	TVB Anniversary Award for Best Actress	Nancy Sit	Nominated
2015	TVB Anniversary Awards	TVB Anniversary Award for Best Supporting Actress	Ali Lee	Nominated
2015	TVB Anniversary Awards	TVB Anniversary Award for Most Popular Female Character	Angela Tong	Nominated
2015	TVB Anniversary Awards	TVB Anniversary Award for Favourite Drama Song	Repay (報恩) by Nancy Sit, Edwin Siu, Evergreen Mak	Nominated
