= My Dangerous Mafia Retirement Plan =

Hong Kong television series

- Official poster
- Also known as: Triad Boss Under the Line of Fire
- 火線下的江湖大佬
- Genre: Modern, Comedy
- Created by: Hong Kong Television Broadcasts Limited
- Written by: Ng Lap-kwong
- Starring: Kent Cheng; Tommy Wong; Alice Chan; Eliza Sam; Mat Yeung; Joel Chan; Kingdom Yuen
- Theme music composer: Alan Cheung
- Opening theme: Line of Fire (火線下) by Fred Cheng
- Country of origin: Hong Kong
- Original language: Cantonese
- No. of episodes: 25

Production
- Executive producer: Catherine Tsang
- Producer: Leung Choi-yuen
- Production location: Hong Kong
- Editor: Ng Lap-kwong
- Camera setup: Multi camera
- Running time: 45 minutes
- Production company: TVB

Original release
- Network: Jade
- Release: 25 April – 27 May 2016

Related
- The Last Healer In Forbidden City; Presumed Accidents

My Dangerous Mafia Retirement Plan
- Traditional Chinese: 火線下的江湖大佬
- Simplified Chinese: 火线下的江湖大佬
- Literal meaning: "Triad Boss Under the Line of Fire"
Transcriptions
Standard Mandarin
- Hanyu Pinyin: Huǒxiànxià De Jiānghú Dàlǎo
Yue: Cantonese
- Yale Romanization: Fósinhah dīk Gōngwùh Daaihlóu
- Jyutping: Fo2sin3haa6 Dik1 Gong1wu4 Daai6lou2

My Dangerous Mafia Retirement Plan (Chinese: 火線下的江湖大佬; Cantonese Yale: Fósinhah dīk Gōngwùh Daaihlóu; literally "Triad Boss Under the Line of Fire") is a 2016 Hong Kong modern comedy television drama produced by Leung Choi-yuen for TVB, starring Kent Cheng, Tommy Wong, Alice Chan and Eliza Sam as the main leads. Filming took place from October 2015 to February 2016 on location in Hong Kong. The series premiered on April 25, 2016, airing every Monday to Friday on Hong Kong's TVB Jade, Malaysia's Astro On Demand and Australia's TVBJ channels during its 8:30-9:30 pm timeslot, concluding May 27, 2016 with a total of 25 episodes.

My Dangerous Mafia Retirement Plan plot centers on triad members who are no longer in their prime and must learn to survive in middle age. It also tells of triads who must learn to adjust to life outside once they are released from incarceration after serving a long prison sentence.

== Synopsis ==
Former triad Ho Kei-song (Kent Cheng) has put his former gang life behind to become a chef and later owner of his own small restaurant since falling in love with his current wife So Yau-lam (Alice Chan) and wanting to provide a stable family life for his daughter Joyce Ho Fuen-sam (Eliza Sam). Life is good as Kei-song and Yau-lam make a good living at their small restaurant and Kei-song's cooking is popular with the locals that frequent his restaurant. Also with Yau-lam's help of providing a mother figure to Joyce, Joyce is a university graduate who works as an investment banker. Their happy family life is threatened when Kei-song's triad boss Lau Cheuk-nam (Tommy Wong) is set to be released from prison after serving twenty years in jail. Not only does Cheuk-nam wants to pull Kei-song back into triad life but Kei-song and Yau-lam's marriage is also put on the line as Yau-lam was Cheuk-nam's girlfriend who never officially broke up with him.

== Cast ==
=== Ho & So family ===
- Kent Cheng as Ho Kei-song (何其爽)
  - Willie Wai as young Ho Kei-song (青年何其爽)

A former triad member who was part of Lau Cheuk-nam's gang. Lau Cheuk-nam's closes and most trusted friend. He fell in love with So Yau-lam when he was taking care of her while Cheuk-nam was in prison. Owner and head chef of Zui Song Song Restaurant. So Yau-lam's husband and Joyce's father.

- Alice Chan as So Yau-lam (蘇佑琳)
  - Roxanne Tong as young So Yau-lam (青年蘇佑琳)

Lau Cheuk-nam's ex-girlfriend who never officially broke up with him. Ho Kei-song's wife and Joyce's stepmother. She and Joyce have a sisterly relationship. So Yau-miu's younger sister. Owns Zui Song Song Restaurant with Kei-song. she works the front of the restaurant as a greeter and cashier.

  - Sonija Kwok was originally cast, but due to a contract issue, she had to turn down the role
- Kingdom Yuen as So Yau-miu (蘇佑妙)
  - Winki Lai as young So Yau-miu (青年蘇佑妙)

So Yau-lam's older sister. She owns a beauty cosmetic shop that sells cheap and expired products. She lives together with Kei-song, Yau-lam and Joyce. In order to lie to Lau Cheuk-nam and protect Yau-lam, she and Kei-song pretend to be a married couple. She and Ko Kar start out as bickering enemies because he always exposes her cosmetic products as bad but the two later end up together.

- Eliza Sam as Joyce Ho Fuen-sam (何寬心)

Ho Kei-song's daughter and Yau-lam's stepdaughter. She works as an investment consultant manager at an investment company. Her enemy at work is the scantily dressed Nicole who is looking to ruin her at work. She is a lion dance student at Ko Kar's Martial Art School and is also the best friend and co-worker of Ko Kar's nephew, Ko Kai. She develops a friendship with police officer Liu Shau-Kei whom she originally mistakes as a restroom pervert and later falls in love with him.

=== Lau's gang ===
- Tommy Wong as Lau Cheuk-nam (柳卓南)
  - Eric Li as young Lau Cheuk-nam (青年柳卓南)

a triad boss who's imprisoned twenty years for smuggling gold. He is originally judged for 30 years, but was released 10 years earlier. He sees that everything has been changed since he was jailed. Cheuk-nam tries to redo the triad but did not succeed. Instead, he witnesses his way is no longer fits for the triad this time so he switches to quit the triad. He finds out that his gold is not confiscated and looks for the one that took his gold. It is finally revealed that it was stolen by his wife Yip Fong-fei (葉芳菲) who was taught by So Yau-miu. After he finds out that he was betrayed by his best friend and wife, he joins the Shark's gang and tries to get his money, but the plan is exposed and he was fought. Later he is judged for murdering Shark while the real murderer is Crab.

=== Liu family ===
- Law Lok-lam as Sir Liu
  - Kitterick Yiu

a policeman and Shau-Kei's father and Lady Win's husband. When he was younger, he was injured by Ho's gang when he joined the police force and was against the triad bureau, so he is very much against Sau-Kei's relationship with Joyce.

- Rainbow Ching as Lady Win. A TV host for a popular dining program, Sau-Kei's mother and Liu's wife.
- Mat Yeung as Liu Sau-Kei (廖守基) (homophone to cellphone with pee, 尿手機), a CID officer, Liu and Win's son. He is in love with Joyce, but due to his father being once injured by Ho's gang, he is having a hard time being with Joyce.

=== Ko family & students ===
- Li Shing-cheong as Ko Kar (高卡) (homophone to high class in the typical Hong Kong pronunciation), a physician and host of Ko Kar Martial Arts School. He is Ko Kai's uncle. He is later with So Yau-miu.
- Joel Chan as Ko Kai (高佳) (homophone to high level, 高階), son of Ko Tau (高斗) and nephew of Ko Kar, a security for Joyce company's building. His father is a businessman running a petroleum enterprise in Brunei. He also learns the lion dance from his uncle Ko Kar. He has been in love with Joyce for a long time but also acknowledges that they are not possible to be a couple. He finally chooses Tina as his girlfriend.
- Cilla Kung as Ko Kar Martial Arts School student.
- Hero Yuen as Ko Kar Martial Arts School student.
- Hoffman Cheng as Ko Kar Martial Arts School student.

=== Zui Song Song Restaurant staff ===
- Russell Cheung
- King Kong Lee as
- Sunny Tai as
- Lee Yee-man as
- Eddie Ho
- Jack Hui as

=== USB Finance Corporation staff ===
- Henry Yu as
- Ada Wong as
- Akai Lee as
- William Chu as
- Chloe Nguyen as
- Doris Chow as
- Joan Lee as
- Kate Tsang as

=== Hong Kong Police ===
- Au Hin-Wai as
- Billy Cheung as
- Derek Wong as
- Jess Sum as Tina

== Viewership ratings ==
Timeslot (HKT)	#	Week	Episode(s)	Average points	Peaking points
Mon – Fri (8:30-9:30 pm); 20:30–21:30	1	25 – 29 Apr 2016	1 – 5	24	28
Mon – Fri (8:30-9:30 pm); 20:30–21:30	2	02 – 6 May 2016	6 – 10	25	29
Mon – Fri (8:30-9:30 pm); 20:30–21:30	3	09 – 13 May 2016	11 – 15	24.7	28.5
Mon – Fri (8:30-9:30 pm); 20:30–21:30	4	16 – 20 May 2016	16 – 20	24	28
Mon – Fri (8:30-9:30 pm); 20:30–21:30	5	23 – 27 May 2016	21 – 25	25	28
Total average				24	30

== Awards and nominations ==
Year	Ceremony	Category	Nominee	Result
2016	StarHub TVB Awards	My Favourite TVB Drama	My Dangerous Mafia Retirement Plan	Nominated
2016	StarHub TVB Awards	My Favourite TVB Actress	Eliza Sam	Nominated
2016	StarHub TVB Awards	My Favourite TVB Actor	Kent Cheng	Nominated
2016	StarHub TVB Awards	My Favourite TVB Supporting Actress	Kingdom Yuen	Nominated
2016	StarHub TVB Awards	My Favourite TVB Supporting Actor	Joel Chan	Nominated
2016	StarHub TVB Awards	My Favourite TVB Female TV Character	Eliza Sam	Nominated
2016	StarHub TVB Awards	My Favourite TVB Theme Song	"Line of Fire" (火線下) by Fred Cheng	Nominated
2016	TVB Star Awards Malaysia	My Favourite TVB Drama Series	My Dangerous Mafia Retirement Plan	Nominated
2016	TVB Star Awards Malaysia	My Favourite TVB Actor in a Leading Role	Kent Cheng	Nominated
2016	TVB Star Awards Malaysia	My Favourite TVB Actress in a Leading Role	Alice Chan	Nominated
2016	TVB Star Awards Malaysia	My Favourite TVB Actress in a Leading Role	Eliza Sam	Nominated
2016	TVB Star Awards Malaysia	My Favourite TVB Actor in a Supporting Role	Mat Yeung	Won
2016	TVB Star Awards Malaysia	My Favourite TVB Actress in a Supporting Role	Kingdom Yuen	Nominated
2016	TVB Star Awards Malaysia	My Favourite TVB On Screen Couple	Kent Cheng & Alice Chan	Nominated
2016	TVB Star Awards Malaysia	My Favourite Top 15 TVB Drama Characters	Kent Cheng	Nominated
2016	TVB Star Awards Malaysia	My Favourite Top 15 TVB Drama Characters	Tommy Wong	Nominated
2016	TVB Star Awards Malaysia	My Favourite Top 15 TVB Drama Characters	Alice Chan	Nominated
2016	TVB Star Awards Malaysia	My Favourite Top 15 TVB Drama Characters	Kingdom Yuen	Nominated
2016	TVB Star Awards Malaysia	My Favourite Top 15 TVB Drama Characters	Eliza Sam	Won
2016	TVB Star Awards Malaysia	My Favourite Top 15 TVB Drama Characters	Mat Yeung	Nominated
2016	TVB Anniversary Awards	Best Series	My Dangerous Mafia Retirement Plan	Nominated
2016	TVB Anniversary Awards	Best Actor	Kent Cheng	Nominated
2016	TVB Anniversary Awards	Best Actress	Alice Chan	Nominated
2016	TVB Anniversary Awards	Best Actress	Eliza Sam	Nominated
2016	TVB Anniversary Awards	Most Popular TV Male Character	Tommy Wong	Nominated
2016	TVB Anniversary Awards	Most Popular TV Male Character	Mat Yeung	Nominated
2016	TVB Anniversary Awards	Most Popular TV Female Character	Alice Chan	Nominated
2016	TVB Anniversary Awards	Most Popular TV Female Character	Eliza Sam	Nominated
2016	TVB Anniversary Awards	Best Supporting Actress	Kingdom Yuen	Nominated
2016	TVB Anniversary Awards	Most Popular Series Song	"Line of Fire" (火線下) by Fred Cheng	Nominated
