= Limelight Years =

Hong Kong television series

- Official poster
- Also known as: Elegant Transformation
- 華麗轉身
- Genre: Modern Drama, Romance
- Created by: Hong Kong Television Broadcasts Limited
- Starring: Linda Chung; Liza Wang; Alex Fong; Damian Lau; Eliza Sam
- Theme music composer: Anthony Lun
- Opening theme: Gorgeous Turnaround (華麗轉身) by Liza Wang
- Country of origin: Hong Kong
- Original language: Cantonese
- No. of episodes: 22

Production
- Executive producer: Catherine Tsang
- Producer: Chong Wai Kin
- Production locations: Hong Kong, Taiwan
- Editor: Au Koon Ying
- Camera setup: Multi camera
- Running time: 45 minutes
- Production company: TVB

Original release
- Network: TVB Jade, HD Jade
- Release: 27 April – 22 May 2015

Limelight Years
- Chinese: 華麗轉身
- Literal meaning: "Elegant Transformation"
Transcriptions
Standard Mandarin
- Hanyu Pinyin: Huá Lì Zhuǎn Shēn
Yue: Cantonese
- Yale Romanization: Wàh Laih Jyún Sān
- Jyutping: Waa4 Lai6 Zyun2 San1

Limelight Years (Chinese: 華麗轉身; Jyutping: Waa4 Lai6 Zyun2 San1; Cantonese Yale: Wàh Laih Jyún Sān; literally "Elegant Transformation") is a 2015 Hong Kong romantic television drama created and produced by TVB, starring Linda Chung, Liza Wang, Alex Fong, Damian Lau and Eliza Sam as the main cast. Filming took place from June till September 2014. The drama began airing on Hong Kong's Jade and HD Jade channels April 27 till May 22, 2015 every Monday through Friday during its 8:30-9:30 pm timeslot with a total of 22 episodes. The final 2 episodes aired on the same night as a 2-hour finale special on Sunday May 24, 2015 starting at 8:00 pm.

This is the third time Wang and Lau have collaborated playing a couple. The two previously worked together in TVB's 1980 Yesterday's Glitter (京華春夢) and 2001 The Awakening Story (婚前昏後)

This is Alex Fong's first drama with TVB in nine years. His last collaboration with TVB was in 2005 My Family (甜孫爺爺).

== Synopsis ==
After recovering from a long term illness, semi-retired popular singer Wah Fong Ying (Liza Wang) realizes that she has lived an unfulfilled life. With two failed marriages and estranged relationships with all of her children, she lives a lonely life. Wanting to mend her relationship with her oldest daughter, Lancy who resides in Taiwan, she travels there and meets Hong Kong photographer Ben Law (Damian Lau), whose wife was a fan of hers. Ben is in Taiwan to fulfill his late wife's wish (Michelle Yim) to have her remains returned to her ancestral home. Romance sparks between the two and soon each becomes the other's strength and support. Realizing that throughout her career she has never sung for her loved ones, Fong Ying decides to hold a last concert for her friends and family with Ben's encouragement, but her daughter Tong Yan (Eliza Sam) rejects her invitation to attend. Fong Ying proceeds to work on her concert and hires personal assistant Jinny Szeto (Linda Chung) and creative director Sean Song (Alex Fong) to help her produce the concert. Just as light seems to shine on Fong Ying again, darkness comes back into her life when Jinny finds out that Fong Ying was involved in an affair with her uncle in the past and Ben starts to suffer from hallucinations due to a brain tumor.

== Cast ==
=== Main cast ===
- Linda Chung as Szeto Tik Tik (司徒迪迪; Dikdik)
- Liza Wang as Wah Fong Ying (華芳凝)
- Alex Fong as Sean Song (桑尚恆)
- Damian Lau as Ben Law (羅斌漢; Robin)

=== Guest appearance ===
- Michelle Yim as Ming Ha (明霞)

=== Law family ===
- Hugo Wong as Law Chi Yue (羅子譽; Famous)
- Jacqueline Wong as Law Chi Wing (羅子穎; Wing Wing)

=== Tong family ===
- Patrick Dunn as Tong Se Kit (唐士捷)
- Jonathan Wong as Vince Tong (唐榮)
- Eliza Sam as Yanto Tong (唐欣)

=== Poon family ===
- Pat Poon as Poon Sa Wo (潘世和)
- Candice Chiu as Lancy Poon (潘南思)

=== Extended cast ===
- William Chak as Ken Pak (畢地特; Buddy)
- Grace Wong as Lydia Nam (藍汀雅)
- Alan Wan as Szeto Bong Bong (司徒邦邦)
- Chung King-fai as Zoek Si (爵士)
- Li Shing-cheong as George Lui (雷佐治)
- Lau Kong as Suen Long (舜郎)
- KK Cheung as Gordon Lai (賴哥頓)
- Timothy Cheng as Yip Ga Yu (葉佳耀)
- Corinna Chamberlain as Alice (愛麗斯)
- Becky Lee as Marjorina (馬祖蓮娜)
- Stanley Cheung as Diamond
- Stephen Wong as Fung Ka Ming (馮家明)
- Lily Liew as Yuet jie (月姐)
- Siu Koi Yan as
- Kelvin Yuen as

== Development ==
TVB 2015 calendar, June image. From top to bottom: Liza Wang, Damian Lau, Alex Fong and Linda Chung.

- A promotional image of Limelight Years was featured in TVB's 2015 calendar for June.
- The costume fitting ceremony was held on May 27, 2014, at Tseung Kwan O TVB City Studio One.
- Original overseas shooting was supposed to take place in Vietnam; due to Vietnam's anti-Chinese protests in 2014, overseas shooting was moved to Taiwan.
- The blessing ceremony took place on June 3, 2014, 12:30 pm at Tseung Kwan O TVB City Studio One Parking Lot.
- Filming of the drama began in June 2014 and ended in September 2014. Shooting of Taiwan scenes took place in late August and early September 2014.
- Limelight Years was one of the dramas previewed at "TVB Sales Presentation 2015" held in November 2014.

== Viewership ratings ==
#	Timeslot (HKT)	Week	Episode(s)	Average points	Peaking points
1	Mon – Fri 20:30	27 April - 1 May 2015	1 — 5	23	27
2	Mon – Fri 20:30	04-8 May 2015	6 — 10	24	27
3	Mon – Fri 20:30	11–15 May 2015	11 — 15	24	29
4	Mon – Fri 20:30	18–22 May 2015	16 — 20	24	26
5	Mon – Fri 20:30	24 May 2015	21 — 22	26	29
Total average				23.95	29

== Awards and nominations ==
Year	Ceremony	Category	Nominee	Result
2015	StarHub TVB Awards	My Favourite TVB Drama	Limelight Years	Nominated
2015	StarHub TVB Awards	My Favourite TVB Actress	Linda Chung	Nominated
2015	StarHub TVB Awards	My Favourite TVB Female TV Character	Linda Chung	Nominated
2015	StarHub TVB Awards	My Favourite TVB Theme Song	Gorgeous Turnaround (華麗轉身) by Liza Wang	Nominated
2015	TVB Star Awards Malaysia	My Favourite TVB Drama Series	Limelight Years	Nominated
2015	TVB Star Awards Malaysia	My Favourite TVB Actor in a Leading Role	Alex Fong	Nominated
2015	TVB Star Awards Malaysia	My Favourite TVB Actress in a Leading Role	Linda Chung	Nominated
2015	TVB Star Awards Malaysia	My Favourite TVB Actress in a Leading Role	Liza Wang	Nominated
2015	TVB Star Awards Malaysia	My Favourite TVB Actor in a Supporting Role	Damian Lau	Nominated
2015	TVB Star Awards Malaysia	My Favourite TVB On-Screen Couple	Alex Fong & Linda Chung	Nominated
2015	TVB Star Awards Malaysia	My Favourite Top 16 TVB Drama Characters	Linda Chung	Won
2015	TVB Anniversary Awards	TVB Anniversary Award for Best Drama	Limelight Years	Nominated
2015	TVB Anniversary Awards	TVB Anniversary Award for Best Actor	Alex Fong	Nominated
2015	TVB Anniversary Awards	TVB Anniversary Award for Best Actress	Linda Chung	Nominated
2015	TVB Anniversary Awards	TVB Anniversary Award for Best Actress	Liza Wang	Nominated
2015	TVB Anniversary Awards	TVB Anniversary Award for Best Supporting Actor	William Chak	Nominated
2015	TVB Anniversary Awards	TVB Anniversary Award for Best Supporting Actor	Jonathan Wong	Nominated
2015	TVB Anniversary Awards	TVB Anniversary Award for Most Popular Male Character	Alex Fong	Nominated
2015	TVB Anniversary Awards	TVB Anniversary Award for Most Popular Female Character	Linda Chung	Nominated
2015	TVB Anniversary Awards	TVB Anniversary Award for Most Popular Female Character	Liza Wang	Nominated
2015	TVB Anniversary Awards	TVB Anniversary Award for Favourite Drama Song	Gorgeous Turnaround (華麗轉身) by Liza Wang	Nominated
2015	TVB Anniversary Awards	TVB Anniversary Award for Favourite Drama Song	Galaxy (銀河) by Liza Wang	Nominated
2015	TVB Anniversary Awards	TVB Anniversary Award for Favourite Drama Song	Flashing On Stage (閃爍登場) by Liza Wang	Nominated
