= Captain of Destiny =

2015 Hong Kong television series

- Captain of Destiny official poster
- Also known as: Cheung Po Tsai
- 張保仔
- Genre: Historical fiction Science fiction Adventure
- Written by: Leung Choi-yuen; Law Chung-yiu; Sin Chui-ching
- Starring: Ruco Chan; Tony Hung; Grace Chan; Maggie Shiu; Mandy Wong; Joel Chan; Elaine Yiu; Kelly Fu; Lee Shing-cheong; KK Cheung
- Theme music composer: Alan Cheung
- Opening theme: "Sailing" (揚帆) by Fred Cheng
- Country of origin: Hong Kong
- Original language: Cantonese
- No. of episodes: 32

Production
- Executive producer: Catherine Tsang
- Producer: Leung Choi-yuen
- Production locations: Hong Kong; Hengdian World Studios; CCTV Wuxi Film & TV Base
- Camera setup: Multi camera
- Running time: 45 minutes
- Production company: TVB

Original release
- Network: TVB Jade, HD Jade
- Release: 21 September – 25 October 2015

Related
- Momentary Lapse of Reason; Lord of Shanghai; Slow Boat Home

Captain of Destiny
- Chinese: 張保仔
- Literal meaning: "Cheung Po Tsai"
Transcriptions
Standard Mandarin
- Hanyu Pinyin: Zhāng Bǎo Zǎi
Yue: Cantonese
- Yale Romanization: Jēung Bóu Jái
- Jyutping: Zoeng1 Bou2 Zai2

Captain of Destiny (Chinese: 張保仔; Jyutping: Zoeng1 Bou2 Zai2; Cantonese Yale: Jēung Bóu Jái; lit. 'Cheung Po Tsai') is a 2015 Hong Kong historical fiction sci-fi television drama created and produced by TVB. The drama is a retelling of the story of 19th century Chinese pirate Cheung Po Tsai and his conflict with the Qing imperial army, meanwhile encountering a time-travelling police constable from the 21st century.

Development for Captain of Destiny began in mid-2014. A two-minute trailer was unveiled at the 19th Hong Kong International Film & TV Market (FILMART) in March 2015, and a second trailer was revealed at the 21st Shanghai TV Festival in June 2015. It was the first of four grand productions to celebrate TVB's 48th anniversary. The drama aired on Hong Kong's Jade and HD Jade channels from 21 September till 25 October 2015, every Monday through Sunday during its 9:30–10:30 pm timeslot. It aired for 32 episodes.

Captain of Destiny received mixed reviews during its run, mainly directed at the story's historical inaccuracies and inconsistent characterisation. However, the serial built a popular fanbase, winning My Favourite TVB Drama at the StarHub TVB Awards and the 2015 TVB Star Awards Malaysia. Ruco Chan received acclaim for his lead performance as the Eleventh Prince, winning My Favourite TVB Actor at both award ceremonies. Captain of Destiny received two awards in the TVB Anniversary Awards, including Most Popular Male Character for Ruco Chan and Best Supporting Actress for Elaine Yiu.

== Synopsis ==
During a high-speed motorboat chase with a criminal, Cheung Chau police sergeant Wong Tai-mui gets herself trapped in a waterspout, accidentally opening a time portal. She travels back 200 years to early 19th century Hong Kong, a time when the island was under Qing rule. She encounters a family of Canton pirates, led by Cheng Yat, his wife Shek Giu, and their adopted son Cheung Po Tsai. Using her knowledge of the future, which she keeps in an E-book, she saves the pirates from a deadly naval battle against the Qing naval fleet led by Prince Man-ho, the eleventh son of the Jiaqing Emperor. Puzzled by her mysterious origins, Cheng Yat and Shek Giu remain wary of Tai-mui and are hesitant in trusting her.

At Beijing's Imperial Palace, Imperial Consort Yim and Imperial Consort Shun manipulate Man-ho to get themselves into a position of higher power. Jaded from politics and family feud, Man-ho decides to let go of his ambition for the crown and flees the palace.

On the day the tiangou covers the sun, another waterspout appears over the Canton sea. Cheung Po Tsai helps Tai-mui open the time portal so she can return to 21st century Hong Kong. In the end they both travel back to the future through the portal.

== Cast and characters ==
=== Main characters ===
- Ruco Chan as Man-ho, the Eleventh Prince (十一貝勒旻皓), a Manchu prince of the Aisin Gioro family. He was the eleventh son of the Jiaqing Emperor. Treated coldly by his father and unwelcomed by his older brothers, Man-ho often sneaked away from the palace to mingle with commoners. When the Canton naval fleet failed to take down Cheung Po Tsai and his pirates, Man-ho saw this as an opportunity to impress his father and led an expedition to the south, promising his father that he would eliminate the pirates from controlling the Canton port.
  - also as Bowie, a wanted criminal mastermind from the 21st century and a descendant of Man-ho. The police and the media dubbed him as the modern-day "Bandit King."
- Tony Hung as Cheung Po Tsai (張保仔), a Red Flag pirate. Cheung Po Tsai was the adopted son of pirate king Cheng Yat, who found him while he and his older brother were attempting to escape from a disaster. As a troublemaker, Cheung Po Tsai used creative ways to take down his enemies. After defeating an enemy ship, he succeeded his father as the lord of the seven seas, earning the name "Bandit King." His character is based on the real-life Chinese pirate, Cheung Po Tsai.
- Grace Chan as Wong Tai-mui (黃娣妹), a Cheung Chau police sergeant from the 21st century (of the year 2015). While chasing the criminal mastermind Bowie, Tai-mui got pulled into a time portal and travelled back in time to early 19th century Hong Kong, where she encountered Cheung Po Tsai and his crew of pirates. Using her knowledge of the future, she helped Cheung Po Tsai escape from Prince Man-ho's naval forces, but gets herself captured in the process. She was shocked when she sees Man-ho, who strongly resembles Bowie.

=== Supporting characters ===
==== Pirates ====
- Maggie Shiu as Shek Kiu (石嬌), a Red Flag pirate. She was the wife of pirate lord Cheng Yat and a close companion to Cheung Po Tsai. A natural-born leader, she assumed control of her husband's fleet after his death. She was bent on destroying the Qing army, who she believed murdered her husband. Her character is loosely based on the real-life female pirate Ching Shih, who ruled the South China Sea during the early 1800s.
- Ram Chiang as Suen Sau-choi (孫秀才), Cheng Yat's right-hand man. He was educated and acted as Cheng Yat's strategist.
  - also as Ip Hok-ming（葉學明）
- King Kong as Lau Sing (劉星), a Red Flag pirate who grew up with English-speaking pirates.
- Tai Yiu-ming as Shum Ho (沈蠔), a Red Flag pirate. He was one of Cheung Po Tsai's loyal followers.
- Law Lok-lam as Cheng Yat (鄭一), lord of the Red Flag pirates and the husband of Shek Giu. His character is based on the real-life pirate captain, Cheng I.
- Eric Li as Wong Yi (黃義), a Black Flag pirate and Cheung Po Tsai's rival.
  - also as Chu Yiu-kai（朱耀楷）
- Oceane Zhu as Wu So-na (烏素娜), a pirate from a different country
  - also as Kam Mei-kei（甘美琪）

==== Qing Imperial Court ====
- Lau Kong as the Jiaqing Emperor (嘉慶帝), the seventh emperor of Qing China.
- Susan Tse as Imperial Consort Shun (淳皇贵妃), Man-ho's mother who had fallen out of favor with the emperor.
  - also as Ip Wing-shan（葉詠珊）
- Elaine Yiu as Imperial Consort Yim (炎貴妃), a Manchu royal from the Plain Yellow Banner. The emperor's favorite concubine, Yim was the most powerful figure among the royal harem. Afraid that Man-ho would eventually gain the emperor's favor and strip her from power, she attempted to dispatch a spy to follow Man-ho in his expedition to the south.
  - also as So Fung-nei（蘇鳳妮）
- Lee Shing-cheong as Fok Yee-tai (霍爾泰), Consort Yim's uncle. Originally the admiral of Canton naval fleet, he got demoted from his rank after failing to capture the southern pirates.
- Otto Chan as Siu-fu (小虎), Man-ho's assistant. He helped Man-ho fight the pirates and assists in overcoming obstacles put up by Fok Yee-tai. Became friends with Man-ho at underground fighting competition for money and the two became sworn brothers.
- Kelly Fu as Ha-sim (夏禪), an imperial maid who serves Man-ho. Touched by her kindness and innocence, Lai Gung-gung arranged Ha-sim to accompany Man-ho in his expedition to the south. Ha-sim was extremely loyal to Man-ho and cared a great deal of his well-being.
- Katy Kung as Tung-suet (冬雪), a palace maid who served Consort Yim.
- Elliot Ngok as Lai Gung-gung (禮公公), an imperial eunuch who was the emperor's personal attendant. Lai was very loyal to Consort Shun, who he regarded as his saviour. Although Man-ho was unliked by the emperor, Lai remained supportive of him.
  - also as Cheung Shing-mui（張勝妹）

==== Wong family ====
- Joel Chan as Wong Yat-hin (黃逸軒), a risk-taking merchant and Tai-mui's ancestor.
- Mandy Wong as Chu Suk-kwan (朱淑君), a prostitute and later Yat-hin's wife.
- Cilla Kung as Wong Wing-yu (黄詠妤), Yat-hin's younger sister.
  - also as Cheung Man-fung（張文鳳）

==== 21st century Cheung Chau ====
- Claire Yiu as Wong Tai-nui (黃娣女), Tai-mui's older sister.
- Joe Tay as Fu Ma (傅碼), Tai-nui's stingy husband who spent most of his money to flatter the members of the Cheung Chau rural committee.
- KK Cheung as Leung Kim-fung (梁劍峰), the senior inspector of Cheung Chau's police division and Tai-mui's direct superior. Carefree and untroubled, Leung was also a sinologist specialising in the Qing dynasty.
- Mat Yeung as "Sam" Ching Sum (程森), a VIPPU police officer and Tai-mui's boyfriend.

==== Guest appearance ====
- Raymond Wong Ho-yin as Unnamed Pirate, an unnamed pirate that crossed through the portal into the 21st century, bringing with him Cheung Po Tsai's former pirate associates.
- Evergreen Mak as Cheung Po Tsai, a character originally played by Raymond Wong in the television drama Slow Boat Home (2013).

== Production ==
=== Development and filming ===
In November 1999, TVB pitched a series called Cheung Po Tsai at its annual sales presentation event. A co-production with Mainland China's CCTV, the project was to star Louis Koo, Jessica Hsuan, and Joe Ma. However, Cheung Po Tsai was later scrapped after a series of cast dropouts and high production costs.

In May 2014, TVB announced that it had green-lit a time-traveling series, which would be produced by Leung Choi-yuen. Ruco Chan was the first actor to be cast in the new series. In August, TVB confirmed that the new series would be called Cheung Po Tsai, and had cast Bosco Wong in the titular role, with Aimee Chan to star alongside. Both Wong and Chan later turned down their roles due to schedule conflicts. Raymond Wong Ho-yin was then reported to star.

A costume-fitting press conference was held on 3 September in the common room of TVB Studio 1 at Tseung Kwan O. Principal photography began in Cheung Chau a few days later. A week into filming, Raymond Wong was diagnosed with Behçet's disease and had to withdraw from the series. Tony Hung was cast to replace him. Hung only had one week to prepare for his role. Wong, however, did return to make a brief cameo appearance in the last episode of the drama.

A blessing ceremony was held on 12 September. Filming moved to Hengdian World Studios, Wuxi, and the Lake Tai Region in November, where they shot at Hengdian World Studios and CCTV Wuxi Film & TV Base. The final phase of production officially ended in early January. At least a million HKD per episode was invested on the project, and an addition $3 million HKD in post-production, which took at least six months to complete due to the series' heavy demand for CG effects.

== Soundtrack ==
Hong Kong musician Alan Cheung and lyricist Yeung Hei were hired to compose and write the drama's official soundtrack. The main opening theme, "Sailing" (揚帆), is performed by Fred Cheng. The ending theme "Next Century" (下世紀), is performed by Ruco Chan. Linda Chung performs the drama's episode plug, "Everlasting Heart" (一顆不變的心), which has lyrics written by Sandy Chang.

Track listing

No.	Title	Lyrics	Music	Singer(s)	Length
1.	"Sailing" (揚帆)	Yeung Hei	Alan Cheung	Fred Cheng	3:37
2.	"Next Century" (下世紀)	Yeung Hei	Alan Cheung	Ruco Chan	3:30
3.	"Everlasting Heart" (一顆不變的心)	Sandy Chang	Alan Cheung	Linda Chung	3:55

Music video

Song title	Video
Sailing (揚帆)	Video on YouTube
Everlasting Heart (一顆不變的心)	Video on YouTube

== Release and promotion ==
In October 2014, TVB released a promotional poster for Captain of Destiny as an image for TVB's 2015 calendar. The image was attached to the month of October 2015.

In March 2015, TVB released the first look of Captain of Destiny at the 19th Hong Kong International Film & TV Market (FILMART), unveiling a two-minute trailer that primarily featured CGI footage. During an episode of the entertainment program Scoop in April, TVB introduced the early post-production stages of Captain of Destiny and interviewed the drama's visual effects team. In June, Ruco Chan, Tony Hung, and Grace Chan went to Shanghai to promote the drama at the 21st Shanghai TV Festival, where they introduced the drama's second trailer.

Captain of Destiny was announced as the first of four grand productions to celebrate TVB's 48th anniversary on 3 September. It is slated to premiere on Hong Kong's TVB Jade and Malaysia's Astro on Demand on 21 September 2015, airing seven days a week from 9:30 to 10:30 pm.

== Historical inaccuracies ==
- In the drama, Wong Tai-mui travels back in time to the fourteenth year of Jiaqing (1809), and encounters a fleet of pirates led by Cheng Yat, a character inspired by the real-life pirate captain Cheng I, who lived during the late 18th century. The real Cheng I died in 1807.
- According to history, the Jiaqing Emperor only had five sons, not fourteen sons like the drama claims.
- The given names of Jiaqing's sons all start with the character 綿 (pinyin: mian; jyutping: min), not 旻 (min; man). The usage of 旻 in the drama may be inspired by Jiaqing's successor the Daoguang Emperor, who changed the first character of his given name from 綿 to 旻 after becoming emperor in 1820.
- Most of the characters in the drama, with the exception of Cheung Po Tsai, Cheng I, Shek Giu, and the Jiaqing Emperor, did not exist in history. Imperial Consort Shun may be inspired by Empress Xiaoshurui.
- The position of admiral for the Canton naval fleet was not established until 1811.

== Reception ==
=== Viewership ratings ===
#	Week	Episode(s)	Average points	Peaking points	Total viewers	Ref.
1	21 – 25 September 2015 (Mon – Fri)	1 – 5	24	27	1.55 million	
1	27 Sep 2015 (Sun)	6	15	—	0.97 million	
2	28 Sep – 2 October 2015 (Mon – Fri)	7 – 11	25	27	1.61 million	
2	4 Oct 2015 (Sun)	12	24	—	1.55 million	
3	5 – 9 October 2015 (Mon – Fri)	13 – 17	25	28	1.61 million	
3	11 Oct 2015 (Sun)	18	23	—	1.48 million	
4	12 – 16 October 2015 (Mon – Fri)	19 – 23	25	—	1.61 million	
4	17 Oct 2015 (Sat)	24	21	—	1.35 million	
4	18 Oct 2015 (Sun)	25	22	—	1.41 million	
5	19 – 23 October 2015 (Mon – Fri)	26 – 30	25	—	1.41 million	
5	24 Oct 2015 (Sat)	31	21	—	1.35 million	
5	25 Oct 2015 (Sun)	32	29	31	1.87 million	
Total average			24.4	31	1.57 million	

== International broadcast ==
Network	Country	Airing Date	Timeslot
Astro on Demand	Malaysia	21 September 2015	Monday – Sunday 9:30 – 10:15 pm
TVBJ	Australia	22 September 2015	Monday – Friday 8:15 – 9:15 pm
TVBJ	Australia	22 September 2015	Saturday – Sunday 9:00 – 10:00 pm
TVBS	Taiwan	19 November 2015	Monday – Thursday 7:00 – 8:00 pm
Starhub TV	Singapore	3 January 2016	Monday – Sunday 9:00 – 10:00 pm
True Visions	Thailand	June 2019	
MonoMax	Thailand		

== Awards and nominations ==
Year	Award	Category	Recipient	Result
2015	StarHub TVB Awards	My Favourite TVB Drama	Captain of Destiny	Won
2015	StarHub TVB Awards	My Favourite TVB Actor	Ruco Chan	Won
2015	StarHub TVB Awards	My Favourite TVB Male TV Character	Ruco Chan	Nominated
2015	StarHub TVB Awards	My Favourite TVB Male TV Character	Tony Hung	Nominated
2015	StarHub TVB Awards	Best New TVB Artist	Grace Chan	Won
2015	TVB Star Awards Malaysia	My Favourite TVB Drama Series	Captain of Destiny	Won
2015	TVB Star Awards Malaysia	My Favourite TVB Actor in a Leading Role	Ruco Chan	Won
2015	TVB Star Awards Malaysia	My Favourite TVB Actor in a Leading Role	Tony Hung	Nominated
2015	TVB Star Awards Malaysia	My Favourite TVB Actress in a Supporting Role	Maggie Shiu	Nominated
2015	TVB Star Awards Malaysia	My Favourite Most Improved TVB Actress	Grace Chan	Nominated
2015	TVB Star Awards Malaysia	My Favourite Most Improved TVB Actor	Mat Yeung	Won
2015	TVB Star Awards Malaysia	My Favourite TVB On-Screen Couple	Ruco Chan and Grace Chan	Nominated
2015	TVB Star Awards Malaysia	My Favourite TVB Drama Theme Song	"Sailing" by Fred Cheng	Won
2015	TVB Star Awards Malaysia	My Top 16 Favourite TVB Drama Characters	Ruco Chan	Won
2015	TVB Star Awards Malaysia	My Top 16 Favourite TVB Drama Characters	Tony Hung	Won
2015	TVB Anniversary Awards	TVB Anniversary Award for Best Drama	Captain of Destiny	Nominated
2015	TVB Anniversary Awards	TVB Anniversary Award for Best Actor	Ruco Chan	Nominated
2015	TVB Anniversary Awards	TVB Anniversary Award for Best Actor	Tony Hung	Nominated
2015	TVB Anniversary Awards	TVB Anniversary Award for Best Supporting Actor	Li Shing-cheong	Nominated
2015	TVB Anniversary Awards	TVB Anniversary Award for Best Supporting Actor	Joel Chan	Nominated
2015	TVB Anniversary Awards	TVB Anniversary Award for Best Supporting Actress	Elaine Yiu	Won
2015	TVB Anniversary Awards	TVB Anniversary Award for Best Supporting Actress	Kelly Fu	Nominated
2015	TVB Anniversary Awards	TVB Anniversary Award for Best Supporting Actress	Susan Tse	Nominated
2015	TVB Anniversary Awards	TVB Anniversary Award for Most Popular Male Character	Ruco Chan	Won
2015	TVB Anniversary Awards	TVB Anniversary Award for Most Popular Male Character	Tony Hung	Nominated
2015	TVB Anniversary Awards	TVB Anniversary Award for Most Popular Female Character	Grace Chan	Nominated
2015	TVB Anniversary Awards	TVB Anniversary Award for Most Popular Female Character	Elaine Yiu	Nominated
2015	TVB Anniversary Awards	TVB Anniversary Award for Favourite Drama Song	"Sailing" by Fred Cheng	Nominated
2015	TVB Anniversary Awards	TVB Anniversary Award for Favourite Drama Song	"Next Century" by Ruco Chan	Nominated
2015	TVB Anniversary Awards	TVB Anniversary Award for Favourite Drama Song	"Everlasting Heart" by Linda Chung	Nominated
