= Young Charioteers =

Hong Kong television series

- Official poster
- Also known as: Cross the Finish Line
- 衝線
- Genre: Modern, Sports, Romance
- Created by: Hong Kong Television Broadcasts Limited
- Written by: Lam Chung Bong 林忠邦; Wong Bing Yee 黃秉怡; Wong Ching Man 黃靜雯; Cheung Wai Yin 張慧賢; Tam Kim Wai 譚劍偉
- Directed by: Patrick Leung 梁崇勳; Chin Wing Zi 錢穎芝
- Starring: Him Law; Sisley Choi; Sammy Sum; Michelle Yim; Rosina Lam; Hanjin Tan; Jinny Ng; Alan Wan
- Theme music composer: Alan Cheung 張家誠
- Opening theme: The Beautiful Time (美好的時光) by Jinny Ng
- Country of origin: Hong Kong
- Original language: Cantonese
- No. of episodes: 20

Production
- Producer: Kwan Wing Chung 關永忠
- Production locations: Hong Kong, Taiwan
- Editors: Lam Chung Bong 林忠邦; Lo Mei Wan 盧美雲
- Camera setup: Multi camera
- Running time: 45 minutes
- Production company: TVB

Original release
- Network: Jade; HD Jade
- Release: 2 March – 27 March 2015

Young Charioteers
- Traditional Chinese: 衝線
- Simplified Chinese: 冲线
- Literal meaning: "Cross the Finish Line"
Transcriptions
Standard Mandarin
- Hanyu Pinyin: Chōng Xiàn
Yue: Cantonese
- Yale Romanization: Chūng Sin
- Jyutping: Cung1 Sin3

Young Charioteers (Chinese: 衝線; Jyutping: Cung1 Sin3; Cantonese Yale: Chūng Sin; literally "Cross the Finish Line") is a 2015 Hong Kong modern, romance, sports drama produced by TVB, starring Him Law, Sisley Choi, Sammy Sum and Michelle Yim as the main leads. Filmed on location in Hong Kong and Taiwan, the series began airing on March 2, 2015 and is broadcast weekly from Monday to Friday on TVB Jade channel 8:30-9:30 pm timeslot.

== Synopsis ==
Former friends Jedi Yau (Him Law) and Fighting Yip (Sammy Sum) are rivals at work, love and bicycle racing. Jedi and Fighting became friends in high school because of their shared interest in bicycle racing, but lost touch when Fighting had to return to Taiwan for family issues. The two meet again when Fighting becomes Jedi's new colleague at CHUR accounting firm, however Fighting doesn't want to resume his past friendship with Jedi. Their rivalry is further intensified when their work superiors Mucci Lai (Hanjin Tan) and Hillary Ning (Rosina Lam) pit Jedi and Fighting against each other to play office politics. To relieve his stress at work Jedi confides to co-worker Wu Sum Lam (Jinny Ng) who works under his mother Vivian Lee (Michelle Yim), in the Secretary department at the accounting firm. Vivian pushes for Jedi and Sum Lam to become a couple and later the two start dating, but Jedi realizes he doesn't have romantic feelings for Sum Lam. Jedi soon finds himself falling for Moon Yeung (Sisley Choi), the new Accountant at work but decides not to pursue her because she is Fighting's close childhood friend and love interest. After building up their heated rivalry both Jedi and Fighting decide to have a bicycle racing competition to once and for all decide a winner in their rivalry.

== Cast ==
=== Main cast ===
- Michelle Yim 米 雪 as Vivian Lee Wai Wan 李慧雲
- Him Law 羅仲謙 as Jedi Yau Tat 游達
- Rosina Lam 林夏薇 as Hillary Ning Hei 寧希
- Sammy Sum 沈震軒 as Fighting Yip Fai Ting 葉輝廷
- Sisley Choi 蔡思貝 as Moon Yeung Kwong 陽光
- Gloria Tang 鄧佩儀 as Tiffany Tam Sin Ngaa 譚倩雅
- Alan Wan 溫家偉 as Ted Lee Chi Hung 李志雄

=== CHUR Accounting firm ===
- Albert Lo 羅浩楷 as Gilbert
- Hanjin Tan 陳奐仁 as Mucci Lai Ye Lim 黎義廉
- Jinny Ng 吳若希 as Wu Sum Lam 胡芯藍
- Adrian Chau 周志文 as Victor Wong
- William Hu 胡渭康 as Mike
- Hubert Wu 胡鴻鈞 as Dai Ga Ho 戴家豪
- Nathan Ngai 魏焌皓 as Lau Lo 劉羅
- Zoie Tam 譚凱琪 as Chu Chu 朱珠
- Lily Ho 何傲兒 as Tong Ga Ga (Siu Tong) 唐嘉嘉 (少糖)
- Russell Cheung 張智軒 as Mike Chim Dak Chi 詹德智
- Ip Ting Chi 葉婷芝 as Chan Bo Ling 陳寶玲
- Wong Hong Kiu 黃匡翹 as Ho Lok Yee 何樂兒
- Nicholas Yuen 阮浩棕 as Sin Dak Yan 冼德仁
- Tse Ho Yat 謝可逸 as Gai Siu Heng 繼少恆
- Emily Chung 鍾鈺精 as May
- Lucy Li 李旻芳 as Secretary
- Chu Fei Fei 朱斐斐 as Secretary

=== Extended cast ===
- Poon Chi Man 潘志文 as Yip Hoi Lung 葉海龍
- Samantha Chuk 祝文君 as Song Choi Nai 宋彩娜
- Vincent Lam 林偉 as Yeung Yat 陽日
- Chun Wong 秦煌 as Shum Gai Yu 沈家儒
- Hebe Chan 陳婉婷 as Yau Nei Ya 游妮婭
- Kayi Cheung 張嘉兒
- Lydia Law 羅欣羚 as Fiona
- Niki Chan 陳潁熙 as
- Helen Seng 沈愛琳 as Joanna

== Development ==
TVB 2015 calendar, January image. From left to right: Sisley Choi, Him Law, Rosina Lam.

- A promo image of Young Charioteers was featured in TVB's 2015 calendar for January.
- The costume fitting ceremony was held on July 15, 2014, 12:30 p.m. at Tseung Kwan O TVB City
- The blessing ceremony was held on August 20, 2014, 3:00 p.m. at Tseung Kwan O TVB City.
- Filming took place from July till October 2014.
- Original overseas filming was supposed to take place in Malaysia but was later changed to Taiwan.
- Taiwan filming took place in September 2014.
- Kayi Cheung was originally cast in the role, Song Choi Nai, but was replaced by Samantha Chuk.

== Viewership Ratings ==
Week	Episodes	Date	Average Points	Peaking Points
1	01－05	March 2–6, 2015	23	25
2	06－10	March 9–13, 2015	23	26
3	11－15	March 16–20, 2015	22	--
4	16－20	March 23–27, 2015	23	25
Total average			22.75	26

== Awards and nominations ==
Year	Ceremony	Category	Nominee	Result
2015	StarHub TVB Awards	My Favourite TVB Actor	Him Law	Nominated
2015	StarHub TVB Awards	My Favourite TVB Supporting Actress	Rosina Lam	Won
2015	StarHub TVB Awards	My Favourite TVB Male TV Character	Him Law	Nominated
2015	StarHub TVB Awards	My Favourite TVB Female TV Character	Rosina Lam	Nominated
2015	StarHub TVB Awards	My Favourite TVB Theme Song	The Beautiful Time (美好的時光) by Jinny Ng	Won
2015	TVB Star Awards Malaysia	My Favourite TVB Drama Series	Young Charioteers	Nominated
2015	TVB Star Awards Malaysia	My Favourite TVB Actor in a Leading Role	Him Law	Nominated
2015	TVB Star Awards Malaysia	My Favourite TVB Drama Theme Song	The Beautiful Time (美好的時光) by Jinny Ng	Nominated
2015	TVB Star Awards Malaysia	My Favourite Top 16 TVB Drama Characters	Him Law	Won
2015	TVB Anniversary Awards	TVB Anniversary Award for Best Drama	Young Charioteers	Nominated
2015	TVB Anniversary Awards	TVB Anniversary Award for Best Actor	Him Law	Nominated
2015	TVB Anniversary Awards	TVB Anniversary Award for Best Actress	Michelle Yim	Nominated
2015	TVB Anniversary Awards	TVB Anniversary Award for Best Supporting Actress	Sisley Choi	Nominated
2015	TVB Anniversary Awards	TVB Anniversary Award for Most Popular Male Character	Him Law	Nominated
2015	TVB Anniversary Awards	TVB Anniversary Award for Most Popular Female Character	Michelle Yim	Nominated
2015		TVB Anniversary Award for Favourite Drama Song	The Beautiful Time (美好的時光) by Jinny Ng	Nominated
