= TVB Star Awards Malaysia =

Annual awards ceremony in Malaysia

- Current: 2017 TVB Star Awards Malaysia
- Awarded for: Excellence in television
- Country: Malaysia
- Presented by: TVB Entertainment News, Astro Wah Lai Toi, MY FM
- First award: 8 January 2005

The TVB Star Awards Malaysia (Chinese: TVB 马来西亚星光荟萃颁奖典礼) is an annual awards ceremony honoring Cantonese programming achievements in Malaysia. It is produced by TVB Entertainment News, with Astro and MY FM as media partners. The ceremony was previously known as the My Astro On Demand Favourites Awards (Chinese: My Astro On Demand 我的最爱颁奖典礼), which succeeded the Astro Wah Lai Toi Drama Awards (Chinese: Astro华丽台电视剧大奖).

The Malaysian television channel Astro Wah Lai Toi, presented by Astro, airs Hong Kong television programmes produced by TVB. In 2005, Astro organised its first awards ceremony, the 2004 Astro Wah Lai Toi Drama Awards, presenting awards to Hong Kong actors and actresses for their acting achievements in TVB television dramas. TVB Entertainment News took over the production of the awards series in 2013, renaming it The TVB Star Awards. It has since become an annual event, and is regarded as a prelude to Hong Kong's TVB Anniversary Awards.

The nominations for the TVB Star Awards are jointly determined by Astro and TVB for TVB programmes shown on Astro Wah Lai Toi throughout the designated year. Winners are decided by the Malaysian public. Presently, voting is done through a mobile app produced by TVB and Astro.

== Categories ==
=== Current categories ===
Current award categories include: My Favourite TVB Drama Series,...Actor and ...Actress in a Leading Role, ...Actor and ...Actress in a Supporting Role, ...Drama Characters, ...On Screen Couple, and ...Drama Theme Song. These categories have been awarded since 2004. In 2011, My Favourite Most Improved TVB Actor and Actress categories were added. In 2013, My Favourite TVB Host In a Variety Program, ...Variety Program, and ...Enrichment Program awards were added bringing the total to thirteen My Favourite TVB awards.

=== Discontinued or special categories ===
Discontinued or special categories include: Most Unforgettable Slap in 2004. In 2005, categories included: My Favourite Gunshot, My Favourite Beauty, My Favourite Father-figure, and My Favourite Mother-figure. Most Unforgettable Kiss category was awarded in 2004 and 2008. My Favourite Supporting Character and My Favourite Extreme Appearance were awarded between 2006 and 2008 inclusive. Most Unforgettable Scene was awarded for the years 2004–2008. Most Unforgettable Villain was awarded in 2004, 2008 and 2009. My Favourite Legendary Character and My Favourite Outstanding Popularity King were awarded in 2012. Rising TVB Star in Malaysia was awarded in 2014 and Astro MY FM’s Special Pick for TVB Drama Theme Song was awarded in 2015.

=== Honorary awards ===
The TVB Star Achievement Award was first awarded in 2014.

== Years ==
Year	Favourite Drama	Favourite Performance					
Year	Favourite Drama	Leading		Supporting		Most Improved	
Year	Favourite Drama	Actor	Actress	Actor	Actress	Actor	Actress
2023	The Invisibles	Kenneth Ma; The Queen of News	Charmaine Sheh; The Queen of News	/	/	/	/
2022	I’ve Got The Power	Ruco Chan; I’ve Got The Power	Moon Lau; The Beauty of War	/	/	/	/
2021	Kids' Lives Matter	Shaun Tam; Take Two	Linda Chung; Kids' Lives Matter	/	/	/	/
2020	Al Cappuccino	Vincent Wong; Legal Mavericks 2020	Katy Kung; Death By Zero	/	/	/	/
2018	Threesome	Benjamin Yuen; Stealing Seconds	Mandy Wong; Threesome	/	/	/	/
2017	Legal Mavericks	Michael Miu; Line Walker: The Prelude	Jessica Hsuan; My Unfair Lady	Joel Chan; The Unholy Alliance	Elaine Yiu; The Unholy Alliance	Matthew Ho	Zoie Tam
2016	A Fist Within Four Walls	Ruco Chan; A Fist Within Four Walls	Nancy Wu; A Fist Within Four Walls	Mat Yeung; My Dangerous Mafia Retirement Plan	Joyce Tang; House of Spirits	Jonathan Cheung	Moon Lau
2015	Captain of Destiny	Ruco Chan; Captain of Destiny	Kristal Tin and Nancy Wu; Ghost of Relativity	Benjamin Yuen; The Fixer	Elaine Yiu; Raising the Bar	Mat Yeung	Tracy Chu
2014	Line Walker	Roger Kwok; Black Heart White Soul	Charmaine Sheh; Line Walker	Hui Shiu-hung; Line Walker	Sharon Chan; Line Walker	Sammy Sum	Samantha Ko
2013	Triumph In the Skies II	Julian Cheung; Triumph In the Skies II	Linda Chung; Brother's Keeper	Him Law; Triumph In the Skies II	Nancy Wu; Triumph In the Skies II	Benjamin Yuen	Eliza Sam
2012	The Hippocratic Crush	Kenneth Ma; The Hippocratic Crush	Tavia Yeung; The Hippocratic Crush	Him Law; The Hippocratic Crush	Nancy Wu; Gloves Come Off	Oscar Leung	Mandy Wong
2011	Ghetto Justice	Kevin Cheng; Ghetto Justice	Myolie Wu; Curse of the Royal Harem	Raymond Wong Ho-yin; Twilight Investigation	Sharon Chan; Ghetto Justice	Vincent Wong	Nancy Wu
2010	Can't Buy Me Love	Moses Chan; Can't Buy Me Love	Charmaine Sheh; Can't Buy Me Love	Ngo Ka-nin; No Regrets	Fala Chen; No Regrets	—N/a	
2009	Moonlight Resonance	Raymond Lam; Moonlight Resonance	Charmaine Sheh; Forensic Heroes II			—N/a	
2008	Heart of Greed	Moses Chan; Heart of Greed	Louise Lee; Heart of Greed	Hui Shiu-hung; Dicey Business		—N/a	
2007	Forensic Heroes	Roger Kwok; Life Made Simple	Gigi Lai; The Dance of Passion	Wayne Lai; Safe Guards		—N/a	
2006	Wars of In-Laws	Moses Chan; The Gentle Crackdown	Myolie Wu; Wars of In-Laws	Raymond Cho; Healing Hands III		—N/a	
2005	War and Beauty	Raymond Lam; Twin of Brothers	Charmaine Sheh; War and Beauty	—N/a		—N/a	
2004	Square Pegs	Roger Kwok; Square Pegs	Flora Chan; Triumph In the Skies	—N/a			

=== Favourite TVB Drama Characters ===
Year	My Favourite TVB Drama Characters	Notes
2017	Ruco Chan as Ko Tsz Kit in The Unholy Alliance; Nancy Wu as Yuen Ching Yan in The Unholy Alliance; Kristal Tin as Fong Wai Chi in A General, A Scholar and A Eunuch; Edwin Siu as Yuan Chong Huan/Wan Tai Kuan in A General, A Scholar and A Eunuch; Raymond Cho as Zuo Guang Dou/Fung Yat Bo in A General, A Scholar and A Eunuch; Rebecca Zhu as Fung Wai Ling in A General, A Scholar and A Eunuch; Vincent Wong as Hope Man San Hap in Legal Mavericks; Sisley Choi as Chiu Ching Mui in Legal Mavericks; Ali Lee as Cherry Never Wong Lai Fan in Legal Mavericks; Michael Miu as Cheuk Hoi in Line Walker: The Prelude; Benjamin Yuen as Chui Tin Tong in Line Walker: The Prelude; Priscilla Wong as Cheng Suk Moi in Line Walker: The Prelude; Ben Wong as Yim Ha in Tiger Mom Blues; Natalie Tong as Cherry in My Unfair Lady; Jessica Hsuan as Molly in My Unfair Lady; Chris Lai as Hanson in My Unfair Lady; Samantha Ko as Tin Mut in My Unfair Lady	Top 17
2016	Ruco Chan as Chor Au-kuen in A Fist Within Four Walls; Nancy Wu as Tiu Lan in A Fist Within Four Walls; Benjamin Yuen as Duen Ying-fung in A Fist Within Four Walls; Grace Wong as Fa Man in A Fist Within Four Walls; Philip Ng as Lung Shing-fu in A Fist Within Four Walls; Bobby Au-yeung as Po Foon in House of Spirits; Joyce Tang as Po Yan in House of Spirits; Koni Lui as Fiona Yu Fa in House of Spirits; Kristal Tin as Miu Miu-miu in My Lover from the Planet Meow; Ali Lee as Hazel Cheuk Yi-chung in Law dis-Order; Mandy Wong as Martha Fong Ning in Law dis-Order; Eliza Sam as Joyce Ho Fuen-sam in My Dangerous Mafia Retirement Plan; Sisley Choi as Eunice Yan Yin in Presumed Accidents; Natalie Tong as Yiu Yiu in Speed of Life; Wayne Lai as Lee Suk-gung in Short End of the Stick; Grace Chan as Yoyo Lam Mung-yiu in Blue Veins	Top 16
2015	Selena Li — Brick Slaves Wayne Lai — Lord of Shanghai; Louis Cheung — Momentary Lapse Of Reason; Tavia Yeung — Momentary Lapse Of Reason; Rosina Lam — Momentary Lapse Of Reason; Priscilla Wong — Madam Cutie On Duty; Ben Wong — Raising the Bar; Elaine Yiu — Raising the Bar; Benjamin Yuen — The Fixer; Mandy Wong — The Fixer; Kristal Tin — Ghost of Relativity; Nancy Wu — Ghost of Relativity; Him Law — Young Charioteers; Ruco Chan — Captain of Destiny; Tony Hung — Captain of Destiny; Linda Chung — Limelight Years	Top 16
2014	Ruco Chan — Outbound Love Tavia Yeung — Storm in a Cocoon; Bosco Wong — The Ultimate Addiction; Nancy Wu — The Ultimate Addiction; Kenneth Ma — Ghost Dragon of Cold Mountain; Selena Li — Ghost Dragon of Cold Mountain; Roger Kwok — Black Heart White Soul; Michael Miu — Line Walker; Charmaine Sheh — Line Walker; Raymond Lam — Line Walker; Sharon Chan — Line Walker; Benz Hui — Line Walker; Linda Chung — All That is Bitter is Sweet; Kate Tsui — Tomorrow Is Another Day; Him Law — Tiger Cubs II	Top 15
2013	Wong Cho Lam — Inbound Troubles Bosco Wong — A Change of Heart; Francis Ng — Triumph in the Skies II; Julian Cheung — Triumph in the Skies II; Chen Fala — Triumph in the Skies II; Myolie Wu — Triumph in the Skies II; Ron Ng — Triumph in the Skies II; Nancy Wu — Triumph in the Skies II; Ruco Chan — Brother's Keeper; Edwin Siu — Brother's Keeper; Linda Chung — Brother's Keeper; Kristal Tin — Brother's Keeper; Kenneth Ma — The Hippocratic Crush II; Tavia Yeung — The Hippocratic Crush II; Mandy Wong — The Hippocratic Crush II	Top 15
2012	Him Law — The Hippocratic Crush Ron Ng — L'Escargot; Linda Chung — Witness Insecurity; Kate Tsui — Highs and Lows; Michael Tse — Sergeant Tabloid; Kenneth Ma — The Hippocratic Crush; Roger Kwok — Queens of Diamonds and Hearts; Tavia Yeung — The Hippocratic Crush; Raymond Lam — Highs and Lows; Wayne Lai — The Confidant; Bosco Wong — Witness Insecurity; Kevin Cheng — Gloves Come Off; Myolie Wu — Ghetto Justice II; Ruco Chan — No Good Either Way; Moses Chan — Master of Play	Top 15
2011	Julian Cheung — The Rippling Blossom Moses Chan — Yes, Sir. Sorry, Sir! Linda Chung — Yes, Sir. Sorry, Sir! Kevin Cheng — Ghetto Justice; Ruco Chan — The Other Truth; Tavia Yeung — The Other Truth; Kenneth Ma — The Life and Times of a Sentinel; Michael Tse — Lives of Omission; Chen Fala — Lives of Omission; Bosco Wong — Lives of Omission; Raymond Lam — Men with No Shadows; Wayne Lai — Forensic Heroes III; Kate Tsui — Forensic Heroes III; Ron Ng — Forensic Heroes III; Myolie Wu — Curse of the Royal Harem	Top 15
2010	Tavia Yeung — The Mysteries of Love Raymond Lam — The Mysteries of Love Steven Ma — Ghost Writer; Charmaine Sheh — Can't Buy Me Love; Linda Chung — Ghost Writer; Kevin Cheng — A Fistful of Stances; Wayne Lai — No Regrets; Kenneth Ma — A Fistful of Stances; Moses Chan — Can't Buy Me Love; Sheren Tang — No Regrets	Top 10
2009	Roger Kwok — D.I.E Steven Ma — A Journey Called Life; Ha Yu — Moonlight Resonance; Moses Chan — Moonlight Resonance; Raymond Lam — Moonlight Resonance; Wayne Lai — The Gentle Crackdown II; Kevin Cheng — Last One Standing; Myolie Wu — War of In-Laws II; Sonija Kwok — D.I.E; Linda Chung — A Journey Called Life; Charmaine Sheh — Forensic Heroes II; Louise Lee — Moonlight Resonance	Top 12
2008	Myolie Wu — To Grow With Love Bobby Au-yeung — Dicey Business; Jessica Hsuan — Dicey Business; Tavia Yeung — Dicey Business; Joe Ma — Maidens' Vow; Bosco Wong — The Price of Greed; Moses Chan — Heart of Greed; Louise Lee — Heart of Greed; Ron Ng — On the First Beat; Charmaine Sheh — The Drive of Life; Raymond Lam — The Drive of Life; Linda Chung — Heart of Greed	Top 12
2007	Moses Chan — Land of Wealth Sonija Kwok — Land of Wealth; Gigi Lai — The Dance of Passion; Charmaine Sheh — The Dance of Passion; Roger Kwok — Life Made Simple; Michael Tse — La Femme Desperado; Raymond Lam — La Femme Desperado; Sheren Tang — La Femme Desperado; Myolie Wu — War and Destiny; Steven Ma — Safe Guards; Bosco Wong — Under the Canopy of Love; Kevin Cheng — Under the Canopy of Love	Top 12
2006	Raymond Lam — Food For Life Charmaine Sheh — Food For Life; Kevin Cheng — Food For Life; Julian Cheung — Shades of Truth; Moses Chan — Love Bond; Bernice Liu — Love Bond; Nick Cheung — The Last Breakthrough; Sonija Kwok — The Last Breakthrough; Roger Kwok — Scavengers' Paradise; Ron Ng — Revolving Doors of Vengeance; Myolie Wu — Wars of In-Laws; Bosco Wong — Wars of In-Laws	Top 12
2005	Raymond Lam — Twin of Brothers Ron Ng — Twin of Brothers; Julian Cheung — Point of No Return; Myolie Wu — Dream of Colours; Kevin Cheng — Hard Fate; Ada Choi — To Catch The Uncatchable; Dayo Wong — To Catch The Uncatchable; Roger Kwok — To Get Unstuck in Time; Sheren Tang — War and Beauty; Gigi Lai — War and Beauty; Maggie Cheung — War and Beauty; Charmaine Sheh — War and Beauty	Top 12
2004	Gallen Lo — Golden Faith Bowie Lam — Vigilante Force; Joyce Tang — Armed Reaction IV; Bobby Au-yeung — Armed Reaction IV; Roger Kwok — Square Pegs; Jessica Hsuan — Square Pegs; Flora Chan — Triumph In The Skies; Francis Ng — Triumph In The Skies; Nancy Sit — Virtues of Harmony; Charmaine Sheh — Perish in the Name of Love	Top 10
