= The Fixer (2015 Hong Kong TV series) =

- Official poster
- Also known as: Problem-Solving Expert
- 拆局專家
- Genre: Modern Drama, Crime, Action, Thriller
- Created by: Hong Kong Television Broadcasts Limited
- Written by: Tang Lik-kei, Ho Ching-yee, Tsang Bou-wah, Yung Chi-kei, Yue Ka-wai, Tam Kam-wai
- Directed by: Lee Kit-wo, Hui Siu-ping, Koon Kwok-wai, Yiu Tin-tong
- Starring: Chin Ka-lok; Mandy Wong; Benjamin Yuen; Rebecca Zhu; Timmy Hung; Tracy Chu; Gigi Wong; Henry Lo; Joseph Lee; Rosanne Lui
- Theme music composer: Alan Cheung Ka-shing
- Opening theme: Maze (迷宮) by Alfred Hui
- Country of origin: Hong Kong
- Original language: Cantonese
- No. of episodes: 21

Production
- Executive producer: Catherine Tsang
- Producer: Poon Ka-tak
- Production location: Hong Kong
- Editor: Tang Lik-kei
- Camera setup: Multi camera
- Running time: 45 minutes
- Production company: TVB

Original release
- Network: TVB Jade, HD Jade
- Release: 10 August – 29 August 2015; 8 February - 8 March 2018 (MediaCorp Channel 8)

The Fixer
- Chinese: 拆局專家
- Literal meaning: "Problem-Solving Expert"
Transcriptions
Standard Mandarin
- Hanyu Pinyin: Chāi Jú Zhuān Jiā
Yue: Cantonese
- Yale Romanization: Chaak Guhk Jyūn Gā
- Jyutping: Caak3 Guk6 Zyun1 Gaa1

The Fixer (Chinese: 拆局專家; Jyutping: Caak3 Guk6 Zyun1 Gaa1; Cantonese Yale: Chaak Guhk Jyūn Gā; literally "Problem-Solving Expert") is a 2015 Hong Kong modern action crime-thriller television drama created and produced by TVB, starring Chin Ka-lok, Mandy Wong, Benjamin Yuen, Rebecca Zhu, Timmy Hung and Tracy Chu.

The filming of this drama took place from January to March 2015. The drama is broadcast on Hong Kong's Jade and HD Jade channels from August 10 till August 29, 2015 airing every Monday through Sunday during its 9:30-10:30 pm timeslot with a total of 21 episodes.

This is the third drama Gigi Wong and Chin Ka-lok have played mother and son. The two previously played mother and son in 2009 A Bride for a Ride and 2012 Divas in Distress.

== Synopsis ==
The Fixers is a secret underground organization that for the right price will solve any problems for their clients no matter if it is legal or not.

The group is led by ex-con Szeto Sam-ping (Chin Ka-lok) who is an expert of escaping from authorities. Also included is certified lawyer and Sam-ping's lover Lui Lui (Mandy Wong), expert thief and fighter Wyman Chan Tai-man (Timmy Hung), talented hacker Mak Ping-on (Tracy Chu) and former government official Bak Suen (Henry Lo), who also handles all the accounting for the group.

== Cases ==
Case #1 - Celebrity Newcomer Drug Case (Episode 1)

- William Chu as Chan Hiu-ming (陳曉明)
- Gordon Siu as Chan Hiu-ming's Manager (陳曉明經理人)

Up and coming promising celebrity Chan Hiu-ming has an all out drug party at a hotel room. Hiu-ming's manager hires The Fixers to remove him from the scene before authorities reach the hotel room. The next day when Hiu-ming arrives with his manager to pay The Fixers, Lui Lui gives a word of advice to Hiu-ming about his lifestyle. Not only does he not take Lui Lui's advice well but he also throws a temper tantrum while leaving The Fixers office. A few days later Hiu-ming is found dead at home from an apparent drug overdose. A rookie cop at the investigation scene comments that he saw Hiu-ming leaving the drug party scene few days earlier but was too busy writing out parking tickets to stop him, but if Hiu-ming had been arrested that night he might still be alive.

Case #2 - Commercial Fraud Fugitive (Episodes 1–3)

- Yao Bin as Luk Tin-ching (陸天澄)

Mainland reporter Luk Tin-ching has been accused by a big corporation of defrauding them out of a huge amount of money, but he was really framed by government officials he uncovered was involve in illegal activities. He escapes to Hong Kong and hides out at an embassy, knowing he will be handed over to authorities soon he seeks the services of The Fixers to help him escape out of the country. After fleeing the embassy with the help of The Fixers, the authorities put out an $5,000,000 HKD wanted amount on him. With a huge figure on his head, triads get involve in finding him also in order to receive the reward money. The Fixers help Tin-ching see his mother one last time and then helps him escape to Thailand. Before leaving he hands over the evidence he has against the government officials to Szeto Sam-ping.

Case #3 - Fake Milk Powder / Kidnapped Triad Boss Wife (Episodes 4–8)

- Eddie Pang as Big Tau (大頭)
- Candice Chiu as Big Tau's wife (頭嫂)
- Ken Law as Small Tau (細頭)

Smuggling baby milk formula powder to mainland has become so profitable that triads have resorted to collecting empty powder cans and packing it with fake formula to resell to mainlanders. Triad boss Big Tau is highly against his younger birth brother Small Tau, producing and smuggling fake formula because it could harm someone. Small Tau doesn't care and defies Big Tau's orders in front of their underlings. A few days later Big Tau's wife is kidnapped, he hires The Fixers to find his wife. Big Tau suspects Small Tau is the culprit due to their earlier clash over the baby formula issue and demands Small Tau hand over his wife. Small Tau insist he took no part in Big Tau's wife kidnapping, but Big Tau does not believe him and kills him. Sam-ping seeing how Small Tau persistently deny any part in Big Tau's wife kidnapping suspects Big Tau might have staged his wife's kidnapping in order to find an excuse to kill Small Tau because of his defiance, but that is not the case and The Fixers becomes Big Tau's next target in his wife's kidnapping. Big Tau's believes The Fixers are also involve with his wife's kidnapping, as revenge Big Tau sends his henchmen to kill Sam-ping's mother. While viewing Big Tau's wife ransom film, Lui Lui notices a pin that links to her mother. She pays a visit and bugs her mother's office, finding out that her mother's feng-shui adviser Law Kang is collaborating with Big Tau's wife to fake the kidnapping. Big Tau's wife planned her entire kidnapping as a way to escape from her philandering and abusive husband. After Lui Lui persuades Big Tau's wife to settle their marriage reasonably, Big Tau then calls off the killing on Sam-ping's mother. When Big Tau's wife demands a divorce and is willing to walk away from their marriage with nothing he becomes enraged and tries to strangle her to death. However, in the process of strangling her, he gets a heart attack and dies when she throws away his medication.

Case #4 - Flower Ranch Nature School's Land (Episodes 8–16)

- Snow Suen as Kei Kei (祁琪)
- Celine Ma as Chu Lee-yin (朱李燕)
- Rosanne Lui as Lui Wah-bik (雷華碧)
- Choi Kwok-Hing as Chan Siu-bo (陳兆波)
- Eric Chung as Lee Mau-gei (李茂基)
- Barry Cox as Ringo
- Andy Wong as Sunny

Lui Lui's friend Kei Kei becomes the victim of slander and harassment when the land that occupies her school becomes sought after by developers. Wanting to shut down Kei Kei's school, someone anonymously post on the internet that she abuses her students. The Fixers get involve to help Kei Kei when protesters outside her school gets physical to cause trouble and harass her. Lui Lui's mother Wah-bik is one of the developers after the school's land because of future government development in the area. The case gets more complicated when Wah-bik's opponent for the school's land Chan Siu-bo, hires a group of hackers to divulge Wah-bik's past illegal payoffs to government officials. Catching the hackers who could ruin Lui Lui's mother won't be easy when Sam-ping finds out one of them is his half-sister Duck Duck Mak Ping-on, who has secretly returned to Hong Kong. Wah-bik assumes she is safe from the hackers since she never backed up her illegal payoff records digitally, but the hackers are one step ahead of her when Duck Duck sneaks into her company to steal the hard copy documents of her illegal government payoffs. However Duck Duck decides to hold onto the documents to use as collateral for Sam-ping to hand over her one night stand Vegas marriage husband Wyman, who is one of The Fixers. Soon Law Kang also wants to get a hold of those documents to take over Wah-bik's company. Using Sam-ping and Lui Lui's past, he blackmails Duck Duck into working for him to ruin Wah-bik. Once the documents are exposed to the public, Wah-bik is forced to resign from her company. To hide as the real culprit who brought down Wah-bik, Law Kang has Duck Duck's fellow hackers killed, framing Chan Siu-bo. In fact Wah-bik was not interested in future development around the school, she only wanted to protect Lui Lui since she believed the guy Lui Lui killed years ago is buried on the school grounds. Enraged since the day Wah-bik rejected his sexual advance and then telling him he is just a regular employee to her, Law Kang who knows about this secret had been patiently waiting for the chance to take everything away from her. Afraid she will have to serve prison time for illegally paying-off government officials, Sam-ping helps Wah-bik fake her suicide. With everyone thinking she killed herself, Wah-bik leaves Hong Kong with a new identity.

Case #5 - Mysterious Man The Fixers Must Help / The Mastermind Behind Case 3 & 4 (Episodes 18–21)

- Joseph Lee as Law Kang (羅庚)
- Alex Yung as Hung Ciu-yeung (洪朝陽)
- Janice Shum as Mun Chi (蚊之)
  - Apple Chan as Teenage Mun Chi (少年蚊之)

With Lui's Development Corp. in his hands, Law Kang wants to erase his triad past and starts killing off all those that knows of his past. Sam-ping and Lui Lui finds a young man named Hung Ciu-yeung, who killed Hang-sik's supervisor Fong Wai-kuen, who is a corrupted senior police officer and Law Kang's triad brother, at The Fixers office demanding their services. When Sam-ping and Lui Lui refuse because of the crime Ciu-yeung committed he shows Sam-ping an image of his mother. After looking at the pictures Sam-ping cannot refuse because Ciu-yeung is his son by his ex-girlfriend. Sam-ping plans to escape Hong Kong with Ciu-yeung, but is betrayed by Ciu-yeung who was hired by Law Kang to frame Sam-ping for the murder of Wai-kuen. Not wanting his son to be in further trouble Sam-ping admits to everything Ciu-yeung tells the police. The police are aware that Law Kang is the real mastermind behind Wai-kuen's murder but must find hard evidence against him in order to charge him. The police find recordings of Law Kan and Wai-kuen's business meetings. With evidence against Law Kang, Sam-ping is cleared of Wai-kuen's murder. However Sam-ping still faces sentencing for aiding and abetting Ciu-yeung. Lui Lui assures Sam-ping that she can fight off the charges. but Sam-ping wants to be sentenced to prison in order to be by Ciu-yeung's side and start a father son relationship with him. Sam-ping is sentenced to 2 years in prison, while Ciu-yeung 7 years since he only took on Law Kang's job to raise money for his mother's medical fees. All the other Fixer members are also sentenced for their past crimes. At the end after being released from prison Sam-ping finally has a healthy relationship with his son and a stable family life with his entire family gathered around the table for dinner.

== Cast ==
=== The Fixers ===
- Chin Ka-lok as Szeto Sam-ping (司徒心平)
  - Aaryn Cheung as Teenage Szeto Sam-ping (少年司徒心平)

An ex-triad and the leader of The Fixers. Chu Fung-yee and Szeto Lo-sat's son. Mak Gai-gwong's step-son. Mak Hang-sik's older brother and Duck Duck Mak Ping-on's older half-brother. He is Lui Lui's lover and then fiancée. After being released from prison he becomes estranged from his family when he was unwilling to change his rebellious ways, but reconnects with them when his mother Fung-yee, suffers from dementia and needs him to take care of her.

- Mandy Wong as Lui Lui (雷蕾)

The legal expert of The Fixers. She advises the team if cases are safe to take on and represent them if they get entangled in legal trouble. She is from a wealthy family. Her mother Lui Wah-pik is CEO of a huge corporation, but the two are estranged due to her mother being preoccupied with work and never there for her when she was growing up. She and Sam-ping's relationship started when he helped her cover a murder she committed on her 20th birthday and also kick her drug habit.

- Timmy Hung as Wyman Chan Tai-man (陳大文)

An expert pick pocketer and good fighter. He provides backup for Sam-ping on cases. He is addicted to high stakes gambling and tends to lose all his money during a sitting. He meets Duck Duck in Las Vegas, after high night of luck in winning the two celebrate with non-stop drinking. Drunk, the two accidentally gets into a flash marriage using fake names, him Leonardo Dicaprio and her Duck Duck.

- Tracy Chu as Duck Duck Mak Ping-on (麥平安)

A computer hacking expert, she joins The Fixers later on. Chu Fung-yee and Mak Gai-gwong's youngest child. Sam-ping and Mak Hang-sik's younger half sister. She is rebellious and lied to Hang-sik that she was studying in England when she was really globe trotting around the world having fun. She gets involve with a hacking group for fast money. She meets Wyman in Vegas and gets married after a drunken night of celebrating their winnings. Unhappy that Wyman leaves her abruptly the next morning she seeks him out and tortures him as revenge.

- Henry Lo as Bak Suen (白純)

The secretary of The Fixers. He handles the accounting for the group. He is a former high-level government official who dealt in illegal smuggling in the US. After offending his US partners he is forced to separate from his family and take on a new identity. He uses the government surveillance system to check up on his family. He is forced to betray The Fixers when Law Kang kidnaps his daughter and grandson.

=== HK Police Organized Crime and Triad Bureau Unit ===
- Benjamin Yuen as Mak Hang-cik (麥行直; nickname 'Shek-tau', rock head in Chinese)
  - Marcus Law as Child Mak Hang-cik (童年麥行直)

Chu Fung-yee and Szeto Lo-sat's son. Sam-ping's younger brother and Duck Duck's older half-brother. He becomes a cop because his step-father, whom he highly looks up to was a cop. He is also the lead detective on his squad. Growing up he had a great relationship with Sam-ping, but as Sam-ping grew older and became a triad member the two drifted apart. Their relationship becomes more estranged when he blames Sam-ping for his father's death.

- Rebecca Zhu as Chiu Dan-ching (趙丹青)

Mak Hang-cik's new supervisor. She is also triad boss Law Kang's foster daughter.

- Adam Ip as Fong Wai-kuen (方偉權)

Mak Hang-cik's former supervisor. A corrupt cop with connections to triad boss Law Kang. In order to cover his triad connections Law Kang has him killed.

- LuLu Kai as Katrina Man Ka-ning (文家寧)

A female detective under Mak Hang-cik. She is also Hang-cik's former girlfriend Man Ka-wai's younger sister. She likes Hang-sik and risk her life to protect him after uncovering Chiu Dan-ching's real identity and connection with Law Kang. She is killed by Law Kang's henchmens.

- Russell Cheung as Kwong Yip-bong (鄺業邦)
- Nathan Ngai as Lo Gai (勞楷)
- Daniel Chau as Ng Dou-gwok (吳多幗)
- Kenny Chan as Ng Fu-siu (吳富帥)

=== Szeto/Mak family ===
- Gigi Wong as Chu Fung-yee (朱鳳儀)
  - Meini Cheung as Young Chu Fung-yee (青年朱鳳儀)

Szeto Sam-ping, Mak Hang-cik and Mak Ping-on's mother. She works as a Chinese medicine physician. In her younger years she was a street hawker who sold dessert soup at a street market, where she met and befriended Lui Wah-bik. She suffers from dementia and forgets her son Mak Hang-sik which forces Sam-ping to come home and take care of her.

- Koo Koon-chung as Mak Gai-gwong (麥繼光)

Chu Fung-yee's second husband. Szeto Sam-ping and Mak Hang-cik's step-father. Mak Ping-on's father. Hang-cik takes his last name since Fung-yee was pregnant by her first husband when she married him. A righteous cop who was highly looked up to by Mak Hang-cik. Even though he is not Sam-ping and Hang-cik's biological father he still cared for and loved them as if they were his own. He was killed while rescuing Sam-ping from a triad battle.

- Ceci So as Szeto Yan-yan (司徒恩恩)

Chu Fung-yee's sister in-law. Szeto Sam-ping, Mak Hang-cik and Mak Ping-on's aunt. She helps Fung-yee operate the Chinese-medicine office.

- Andy Lau Tin-lung as Szeto Lo-sat (司徒老實)

Chu Fung-yee's first husband. Sam-ping and Hang-cik's father. He was originally Lui Wah-bik's boyfriend but he broke up with her and pursued Fung-yee when Wah-bik rejected his marriage proposal. He was killed in a car accident before Hang-cik was born.

- Alex Yung as Hung Ciu-yeung (洪朝陽)

Szeto Sam-ping's illegitimate son with his former girlfriend Mun Chi. He grew up in a dysfunctional abusive home. Law Kang hires him to frame Sam-ping for the murder of Fong Wai-kuen.

=== Extended cast ===
- Joseph Lee as Law Kang (羅庚)

Chiu Dan-ching's foster father and Sam-ping's former triad boss. He is a well known feng-shui master who is highly sought after by the rich and powerful for his services, but in fact he is really a high level triad boss with help from within the HK police for personal gain. Enraged that Lui Wah-bik rejected him he schemed to take over her corporation. After becoming the main share holder of Lui's corporation he wants his triad past erased and starts killing off all those that knows of his true identity. Main Villain of the series.

- Rosanne Lui as Lui Wah-bik (雷華碧)
  - Cindy Yeung as Young Lui Wah-bik (青年雷華碧)

Lui Lui's mother. She was a former street market singer and current CEO of a huge development corporation. She and Lui Lui have an estranged relationship due to her focusing on her work and company while neglecting Lui Lui when she was growing up. Her feng-shui adviser Law Kang devise a plan to take over her company because she sees him as a regular employee and rejected his sexual advances. Afraid that she will be sent to prison for a past misdeed she did to protect Lui Lui, Sam-ping helps her fake her death and gives her a new identity.

- Snow Suen as Kei Kei (祁琪)

Single mother to Kei Chi. She is also Lui Lui's best friend. She runs an elementary school in the country side.

- Hugo Chan as Kei Chi (祁子)

Kei Kei's son and Bak Suen's maternal grandson.

- Kirby Lam as Wing-chi (榮子)

Lui Wah-bik loyal personal secretary.

- Shally Tsang as Sis Wan (雲姐)

The Lui family household maid.

- Kimmi Tsui as Ah Lung (阿龍)

An employee at Chu Fung-yee's Chinese medicine office.

- Alan Tam Kwan-lun as Ah Fu (阿虎)

An employee at Chu Fung-yee's Chinese medicine office.

- Samuel Chan as Ah Biu (阿鏢)

An employee at Chu Fung-yee's Chinese medicine office.

- Vicky Chan as Man Ka-wai (文家慧)

Mak Hang-cik's former girlfriend and Katrina Man Ka-ning older sister. She went abroad to study and dumped Hang-cik after meeting someone else.

- Marcus Kwok
- James Wong
- Jason Sze
- Charles Fan
- Vanessa Tse
- Nicholas Yuen
- Vincent Ho
- Alex Lam

== Production ==
The costume fitting ceremony was held on January 6, 2015, at 12:30 pm Tseung Kwan O TVB City Studio One. The blessing ceremony took place on January 22, 2015, at 3:00 pm Tseung Kwan O TVB City Studio Fifteen. The drama is Mandy Wong's first leading role. The Fixer was a last minute add on to TVB's Amazing Summer broadcast schedule. Rogue Emperor was originally scheduled to broadcast during the 8:30-9:30 timeslot, while Brick Slaves was scheduled to broadcast during the 9:30-10:30 timeslot. Afraid another period drama not long after The Empress of China ended would affect the ratings, Rogue Emperor was removed from the broadcast schedule. Brick Slaves was then moved to the 8:30-9:30 timeslot and The Fixer taking the 9:30-10:30 timeslot.

== Viewership ratings ==
#	Timeslot (HKT)	Week	Episode(s)	Average points	Peaking points	Note
1	Mon – Sun; 21:30–22:30	10–16 Aug 2015	1 — 7	25	27	Sat 22 pts; Sun 29 pts
2	Mon – Sun; 21:30–22:30	17–23 Aug 2015	8 — 14	26	--	Sat 30 pts; Sun 29 pts
3	Mon – Sun; 21:30–22:30	24–29 Aug 2015	15 — 21	26	--	Sat 25 pts
Total average				25		

== International broadcast ==
Network	Country	Airing Date	Timeslot
Astro On Demand	Malaysia	August 10, 2015	Monday - Sunday 9:30-10:15 pm
TVBJ	Australia	August 11, 2015	Monday - Sunday 12:30 -1:30 am
Mediacorp Channel 8	Singapore	February 8, 2018	Monday - Friday 9:00-10:00pm

This program will broadcast on weekdays from 9pm to 10pm with the show was dubbed into Mandarin.

It repeated its run from Monday to Friday from 8am to 9 am.

== Awards and nominations ==
Year	Ceremony	Category	Nominee	Result
2015	StarHub TVB Awards	My Favourite TVB Supporting Actor	Benjamin Yuen	Nominated
2015	StarHub TVB Awards	My Favourite TVB Theme Song	Maze (迷宮) by Alfred Hui	Nominated
2015	TVB Star Awards Malaysia	My Favourite TVB Drama Series	The Fixer	Nominated
2015	TVB Star Awards Malaysia	My Favourite TVB Actor in a Supporting Role	Benjamin Yuen	Won
2015	TVB Star Awards Malaysia	My Favourite TVB Actress in a Supporting Role	Tracy Chu	Nominated
2015	TVB Star Awards Malaysia	My Favourite Top 16 TVB Drama Characters	Benjamin Yuen	Won
2015	TVB Star Awards Malaysia	My Favourite Top 16 TVB Drama Characters	Mandy Wong	Won
2015	TVB Anniversary Awards	TVB Anniversary Award for Best Drama	The Fixer	Nominated
2015	TVB Anniversary Awards	TVB Anniversary Award for Best Actor	Chin Ka Lok	Nominated
2015	TVB Anniversary Awards	TVB Anniversary Award for Best Actress	Mandy Wong	Nominated
2015	TVB Anniversary Awards	TVB Anniversary Award for Best Supporting Actor	Timmy Hung	Nominated
2015	TVB Anniversary Awards	TVB Anniversary Award for Best Supporting Actress	Tracy Chu	Nominated
2015	TVB Anniversary Awards	TVB Anniversary Award for Most Popular Male Character	Benjamin Yuen	Nominated
2015	TVB Anniversary Awards	TVB Anniversary Award for Favourite Drama Song	Maze (迷宮) by Alfred Hui	Nominated
