= List of TVB dramas in 2015 =

This is a list of television serial dramas released by TVB in 2015.

== Top ten drama series in ratings ==
The following is a list of the highest-rated drama series released by TVB in 2015. The list includes premiere week, final week ratings, series finale ratings, as well as the average overall count of live Hong Kong viewers (in millions). The top five include overall ratings across all platforms.^{[A]}

Highest-rated drama series of 2015
Rank	English title	Chinese title	Average	Peak	Premiere week	Final week	Series finale	HK viewers (millions)
1	Ghost of Relativity	鬼同你OT	27 (29.2)	34	26	28	30	1.72 (1.89)
2	The Empress of China	武則天	26 (27.2)	37	23	28	32	1.65 (1.76)
3	Eye In the Sky	天眼	25 (26.9)	28	25	25	26	1.65 (1.74)
4	Brick Slaves	樓奴	25 (26.8)	28	25	26	26	1.65 (1.73)
5	Lord of Shanghai	梟雄	25 (26.5)	32	25	26	29	1.59 (1.72)
6	Noblesse Oblige	宦海奇官	25	29	24	26	26	1.63
7	Smooth Talker	以和為貴	25	28	25	25	26	1.62
8	The Fixer	拆局專家	25	29	25	27	25	1.62
9	Madam Cutie On Duty	師奶MADAM	25	30	25	26	28	1.62
10	With or Without You	東坡家事	25	29	24	25	25	1.60

Notes

- A Average numbers are derived from consolidated ratings as reported by Nielsen and on TVB's annual report. A consolidated rating is defined as the summation of TV ratings, online live rating, and online catch-up rating.

== Awards ==
Category/Organization	StarHub TVB Awards 24 October 2015	TVB Star Awards Malaysia 28 November 2015	TVB Anniversary Awards 13 December 2015
Best Drama	Captain of Destiny		Lord of Shanghai
Best Actor	Ruco Chan; Captain of Destiny		Anthony Wong; Lord of Shanghai
Best Actress	Liza Wang; Limelight Years	Kristal Tin and Nancy Wu; Ghost of Relativity	Nancy Wu; Ghost of Relativity
Best Supporting Actor	Vincent Wong; Tomorrow Is Another Day (from 2014)	Benjamin Yuen; The Fixer	Willie Wai; Lord of Shanghai
Best Supporting Actress	Rosina Lam; Young Charioteers	Elaine Yiu; Raising the Bar	Elaine Yiu; Captain of Destiny
Most Improved Actor	—N/a	Mat Yeung; Madam Cutie On Duty, Momentary Lapse of Reason, Captain of Destiny and Lord of Shanghai	Tony Hung; Eye In the Sky, Every Step You Take, Captain of Destiny, World's Great Parties, Not Far But Away
Most Improved Actress	Tracy Chu (as Most Improved TVB Artist); Smooth Talker and The Fixer	Tracy Chu; Smooth Talker and The Fixer	Grace Chan; Raising the Bar, Captain of Destiny, Organized Dining, 2015 TVB Most Popular TV Commercial Awards, 48th TVB Anniversary Gala
Best Theme Song	"The Truth" by Alfred Hui, Hubert Wu; Eye in the Sky	"Sailing" by Fred Cheng; Captain of Destiny	"The Secret of Tears" by Jinny Ng; The Empress of China

== First line-up ==
These dramas air in Hong Kong from 8:00pm to 8:30pm, Monday to Friday on Jade.

Broadcast	English title (Chinese title)	Eps.	Cast and crew	Theme song(s)	Avg. rating	Genre	Ref.
(from 2012); 14 May– 3 Jul	Come Home Love 愛·回家	804	Tsui Yu-on (producer); Lau Dan, Tsui Wing, Lai Lok-yi, Yvonne Lam, Florence Kwok, Carlo Ng, Angel Chiang, Joey Law, Queenie Chu, Samantha Ko	"擁抱愛" (Embrace Love) by Joyce Cheng	23.5	Sitcom	
6 Jul– 1 Apr (to 2016)	Come Home Love (series 2) 愛·回家	191	Law Chun-ngok (producer); Louis Cheung, Priscilla Wong, Owen Cheung, Quinn Ho, James Ng, Katy Kung, Evergreen Mak, Lee Fung, Helen Ma	"愛同行" (Walk With Love) by Fred Cheng	22	Sitcom	

== Second line-up ==
These dramas air in Hong Kong from 8:30pm to 9:30pm, Monday to Friday on Jade.

Background shading indicates dramas not produced by TVB.

Broadcast	English title (Chinese title)	Eps.	Cast and crew	Theme song(s)	Avg. rating	Genre	Ref.
(from 2014); 29 Dec– 23 Jan	Noblesse Oblige 宦海奇官	21	Lee Tim-sing (producer); Kenneth Ma, Tavia Yeung, Joel Chan, Benjamin Yuen, Lau Dan, Yoyo Chen, Cilla Kung, Ram Chiang, Susan Tse, Li Shing-cheong	"是非" (Gossip) by Ronald Law & Grace Wong	25.25	Historical period drama	
26 Jan– 27 Feb	Raising the Bar 四個女仔三個Bar	25	Joe Chan (producer); Ben Wong, Louis Cheung, Ram Chiang, Grace Chan, Elaine Yiu, Jeannie Chan, Stephanie Ho, Natalie Tong, Timothy Cheng, Elena Kong, Moon Lau	"我和你"(You & I) by Stephanie Ho "面前人"(You Are the One) by Louis Cheung & Grace Chan	23.8	Legal drama	
2 Mar– 27 Mar	Young Charioteers 衝線	20	Kwan Wing-chung (producer); Him Law, Sammy Sum, Rosina Lam, Sisley Choi, Michelle Yim, Hanjin Tan, Jinny Ng	"美好的時光"(The Beautiful Time) by Jinny Ng	22.75	Sports, Romance	
30 Mar– 26 Apr	Romantic Repertoire 水髮胭脂	20	Lee Yim-fong (producer); Moses Chan, Joyce Koi, Louise Lee, Evergreen Mak, Katy Kung, Jason Chan Chi-san	"天衣無縫" (Flawless) by Anthony Lun ft. Joyce Koi	24	Romantic comedy, Opera	
27 Apr– 24 May	Limelight Years 華麗轉身	22	Chong Wai-kin (producer); Liza Wang, Damian Lau, Linda Chung, Alex Fong, Eliza Sam	"華麗轉身" (Gorgeous Turnaround) by Liza Wang "銀河"(Galaxy) by Liza Wang "閃爍登場" (Flashing On Stage) by Liza Wang	24	Romance, Drama	
25 May– 19 Jun	Wudang Rules 潮拜武當	20	Nelson Cheung (producer); Chin Siu-ho, Tavia Yeung, Yuen Qiu, Timmy Hung, Derek Kok, Toby Leung, Stanley Cheung, Jonathan Cheung, Regen Cheung	"無懼" (Without Fear) by C AllStar	23	Martial arts	
22 Jun– 2 Aug	Master of Destiny 風雲天地	32	Wong Jing (producer); Liza Wang, Hawick Lau, Angie Chiu, Tiffany Tang, Kenny Wong, Edwin Siu, Wayne Lai, Selena Li, Kimmy Tong, Monica Mok	"轟天動地" (Unbeatable) by Edwin Siu	23.4	Drama	
3 Aug– 28 Aug	Brick Slaves 樓奴	20	Law Chun-ngok (producer); Selena Li, Vincent Wong, Evergreen Mak, Eliza Sam, Kiki Sheung, KK Cheung, Rachel Kan	"400呎" (400 Sq Ft) by Edwin Siu	25.5	Romantic comedy	
31 Aug– 25 Sep	Every Step You Take 陪着你走	20	Andy Chan (producer); Moses Chan, Myolie Wu, Evergreen Mak, Elaine Yiu, Owen Cheung, Cilla Kung	"天使" (Angel) by Myolie Wu	22.25	Romance	
28 Sep– 23 Oct	Under the Veil 無雙譜	20	Law Chun-ngok (producer); Wayne Lai, Bosco Wong, Kristal Tin, Raymond Wong Ho-yin, Sonija Kwok, Eliza Sam	"獨一無二" (One and Only) by Vincy Chan	24.25	Fantasy, Romance	
26 Oct– 4 Dec	With or Without You 東坡家事	30	Wong Wai-sing (producer); Bobby Au-Yeung, Joey Meng, Vincent Wong, Jacqueline Wong, Alice Chan, Harriet Yeung, Sire Ma, Pal Sinn, Jonathan Cheung, Tyson Chak	"我不夠好" (I am Not Good) by Linda Chung	24.67	Historical period comedy	
7 Dec– 8 Jan (to 2016)	The Executioner 刀下留人	26	Law Chun-ngok (producer); Sin Tsui-sing (writers); Kenny Wong, Maggie Shiu, Mat Yeung, Katy Kung, Elaine Yiu, Joel Chan, Bowie Wu, Hugo Ng, Stanley Cheung	"相信明天" (A Better Tomorrow) by Hubert Wu	25	Historical period drama	

== Third line-up ==
These dramas aired in Hong Kong from 9:30pm to 10:30pm, Monday to Friday on Jade.

Background shading indicates dramas not produced by TVB.

Broadcast	English title (Chinese title)	Eps.	Cast and crew	Theme song(s)	Avg. rating	Genre	Ref.
(from 2014); 16 Dec– 9 Jan	Officer Geomancer 八卦神探	20	Nelson Cheung (producer); Johnson Lee, Joey Meng, Sisley Choi, Oscar Leung, Rebecca Zhu, Law Lok-lam, Harriet Yeung, Fred Cheng, Law Lan, William Chak, Mimi Chu, Mak Ling-ling	"造反"(Rebel) by Fred Cheng	24.25	Comedy, Police procedural	
12 Jan– 6 Feb	Madam Cutie On Duty 師奶Madam	20	Lee Yim-fong (producer); Edwin Siu, Priscilla Wong, Mandy Wong, Raymond Cho, Rachel Kan, Anderson Junior, Law Kwan, Stanley Cheung, Kaki Leung	"I'll Always Be Yours" by Edwin Siu	25	Romantic comedy	
9 Feb– 28 Feb	My "Spiritual" Ex-Lover 倩女喜相逢	15	Chong Wai-kin (producer); Nancy Sit, Edwin Siu, Evergreen Mak, Oscar Leung, Joyce Tang, Angela Tong, Jinny Ng	"報恩" (Repay) by Nancy Sit, Edwin Siu, Evergreen Mak Cheung-ching	22.6	Historical period comedy	
2 Mar– 27 Mar	Eye In the Sky 天眼	20	Dave Fong (producer); Kevin Cheng, Ruco Chan, Tavia Yeung, Rosina Lam, Tony Hung, Samantha Ko, Jonathan Cheung	"真相" (The Truth) by Alfred Hui & Hubert Wu	25	Crime, Thriller	
30 Mar– 24 Apr	Smooth Talker 以和為貴	20	Lam Chi-wah (producer); Joe Ma, Kate Tsui, Johnson Lee, Elena Kong, Tommy Wong, Tracy Chu	"出口" (Way Out) by Justin Lo & Johnson Lee	25	Crime drama	

Starting on 26 April 2015, these dramas air in Hong Kong everyday from 9:30pm to 10:30pm on Jade.

Broadcast	English title (Chinese title)	Eps.	Cast and crew	Theme song(s)	Avg. rating	Genre	Ref.
26 Apr– 12 Jul	The Empress of China 武則天	75	Gao Yijun (producer); Fan Bingbing, Zhang Fengyi, Aarif Rahman, Janine Chang, Li Jie, Lee Lee-jen, Kathy Chow, Zhang Ting	"女皇" (The Empress) by Joey Yung "眼淚的秘密" (Secret Tears) by Jinny Ng "不顧一切" (No Matter What It Takes) by Linda Chung	25.45	Historical fiction	
13 Jul– 9 Aug	Ghost of Relativity 鬼同你OT	28	Steven Tsui (producer); Moses Chan, Kristal Tin, Nancy Wu, Eddie Kwan, Pierre Ngo, Vivien Yeo, Ram Chiang, Mimi Chu	"天光" (Sunrise) by C AllStar	26.5	Romantic comedy, Supernatural	
10 Aug– 29 Aug	The Fixer 拆局專家	21	Poon Ka-tak (producer); Chin Ka-lok, Mandy Wong, Benjamin Yuen, Rebecca Zhu, Timmy Hung, Tracy Chu, Gigi Wong, Henry Lo, Joseph Lee, Rosanne Lui, Lulu Kai	"迷宮" (Maze) by Alfred Hui	25	Crime drama	
31 Aug– 20 Sep	Momentary Lapse of Reason 收規華	20	Dave Fong (producer); Tavia Yeung, Louis Cheung, Rosina Lam, Mat Yeung, Lau Kong, Timothy Cheng	"月無聲" (Silent Night) by Louis Cheung	23	Drama, Thriller	
21 Sep– 25 Oct	Captain of Destiny 張保仔	32	Leung Choi-yuen (producer); Ruco Chan, Tony Hung, Grace Chan, Maggie Shiu, Mandy Wong, Joel Chan, Elaine Yiu, Kelly Fu, Susan Tse, KK Cheung, Li Shing-cheong, Lau Kong	"揚帆"(Sailing) by Fred Cheng "下世紀" (Next Century) by Ruco Chan "一顆不變的心" (Everlasting Heart) by Linda Chung	24.4	Historical fiction, Sci-fi, Adventure	
26 Oct– 27 Nov	Lord of Shanghai 梟雄	32	Amy Wong (producer); Anthony Wong, Kent Tong, Wayne Lai, Kenneth Ma, Myolie Wu, Louisa So, Ron Ng, Alice Chan, Eddie Kwan, Raymond Cho, Mat Yeung, Pierre Ngo, Natalie Tong, Grace Wong	"黑雨" (Black Rain) "歲月無悔" (Regretless) by Alfred Hui	24.6	Period drama	
30 Nov– 27 Dec	Angel In-the-Making 實習天使	25	Yip Chun-fai (producer); Tony Hung, Pal Sinn, Eliza Sam, Alice Chan, Moon Lau, Elaine Yiu, Jinny Ng	"我們都受傷" (We Are All Hurt) by Jinny Ng	22	Medical drama	
28 Dec– 17 Jan (to 2016)	Wu Xin: The Monster Killer 無心法師	20	Karen Tsai (producer); Lin Yufen, Gao Linpao (directors); Elvis Han, Gina Jin, Sebrina Chen, Zhang Ruoyun, Mike, Ian Wang	"記住忘記我" (Remember To Forget Me) by Alfred Hui	22	Period drama, Fantasy	

== Weekend dramas ==
These dramas air in Hong Kong every Saturday or Sunday night from 8.00pm to 9.00pm on Jade.

Broadcast	English title (Chinese title)	Eps.	Cast and crew	Theme song(s)	Avg. rating	Genre	Notes	Official website
(from 2014); 19 Oct– 04 Jan	Tiger Cubs II 飛虎II	10	Lam Chi-wah (producer); Joe Ma, Linda Chung, Him Law, Mandy Wong, Oscar Leung, Timmy Hung, Benjamin Yuen, Christine Kuo	"血與汗" (Blood, Sweat and Tears) by Joe Ma	21.1	Crime, Action	airs for 2 hours every Sunday for ten weeks	
