= TVB Anniversary Award for Most Popular Female Character =

Hong Kong television award

- Awarded for: "Popular Performance by an Actress in a Television Role"
- Country: Hong Kong
- Presented by: Television Broadcasts Limited (TVB)
- First award: 2006
- Currently held by: Amy Fan Yik Man - Come Home Love: Lo and Behold (2022)
- Website: http://birthday.tvb.com/

The TVB Anniversary Award for Most Popular Female Character is one of the TVB Anniversary Awards presented annually by Television Broadcasts Limited (TVB) to recognize an actress who has delivered a popular performance in a Hong Kong television drama role throughout the designated year. The My Favourite Female Television Role (我最喜愛的電視女角色) was not introduced to the awards ceremony until 2006, nine years after its establishment. In 2013, the name was changed to Most Popular Female Television Role (最受歡迎電視女角色).

The original equivalent of the award was called My Favourite Television Roles of the Year (本年度我最喜愛的電視角色), which was created in 2003. The award was given to 12 winners for both actors and actresses. In 2006, the award was divided into two separate gender categories and reduced to one specific winner. The 2019 awards ceremony was the first and only ceremony to have two winners tied for Most Popular Female Character.

== Winners and nominees ==
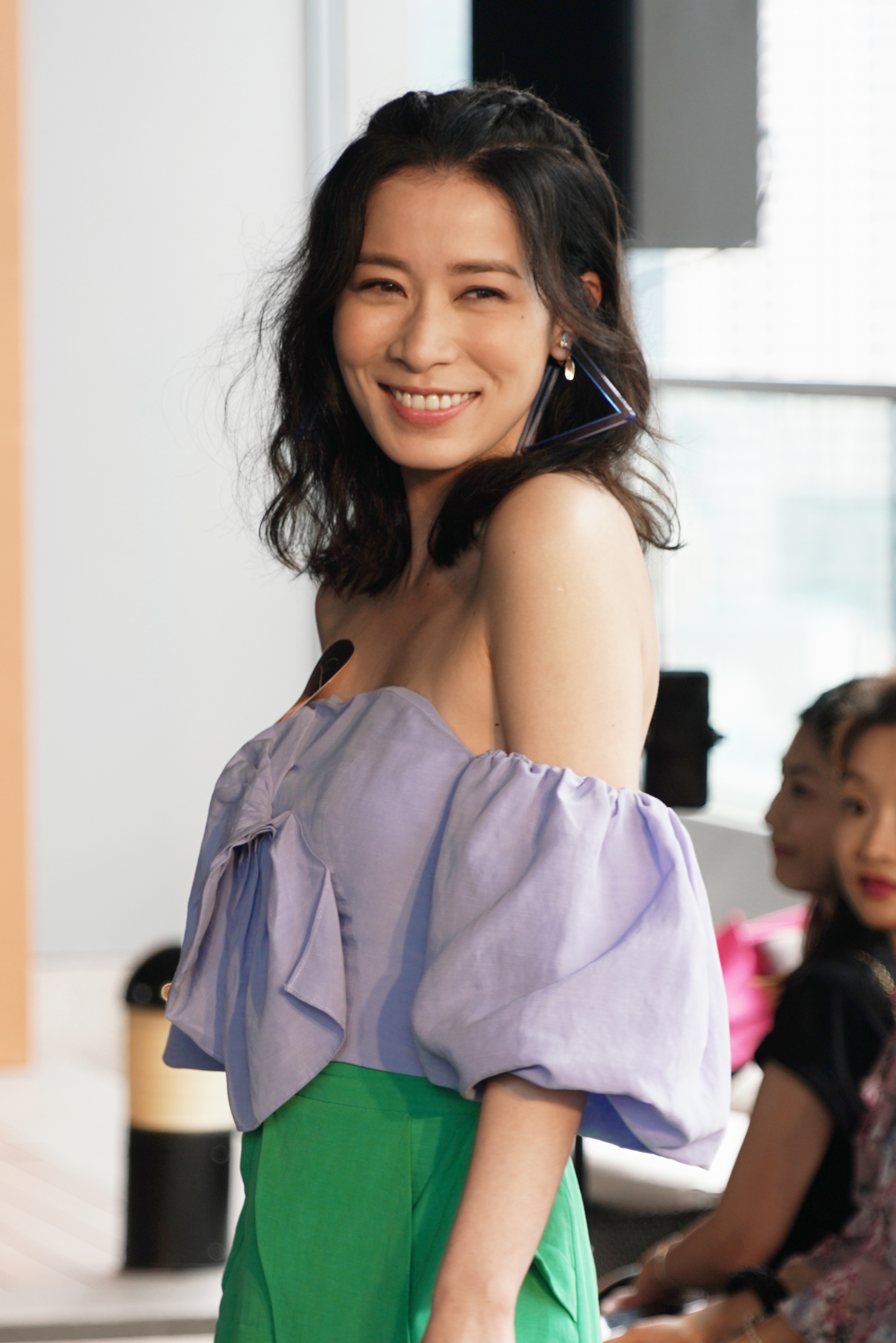
Charmaine Sheh won in 2006 for her performance in Maidens' Vow. She won again in 2010 for her portrayal of Princess Chiu-yeung in Can't Buy Me Love.

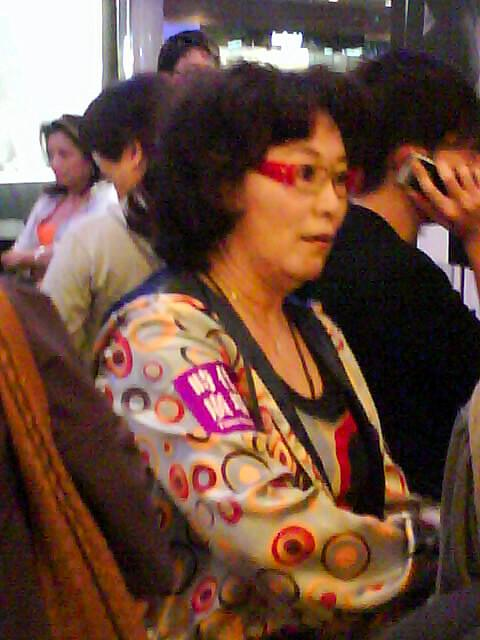
Louise Lee is the oldest winner. She won in 2008 for her portrayal of Chung Siu-hor in Moonlight Resonance.

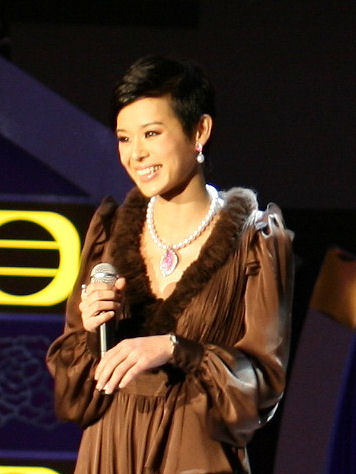
Myolie Wu won in 2011 for her portrayal of Kris Wong in Ghetto Justice.

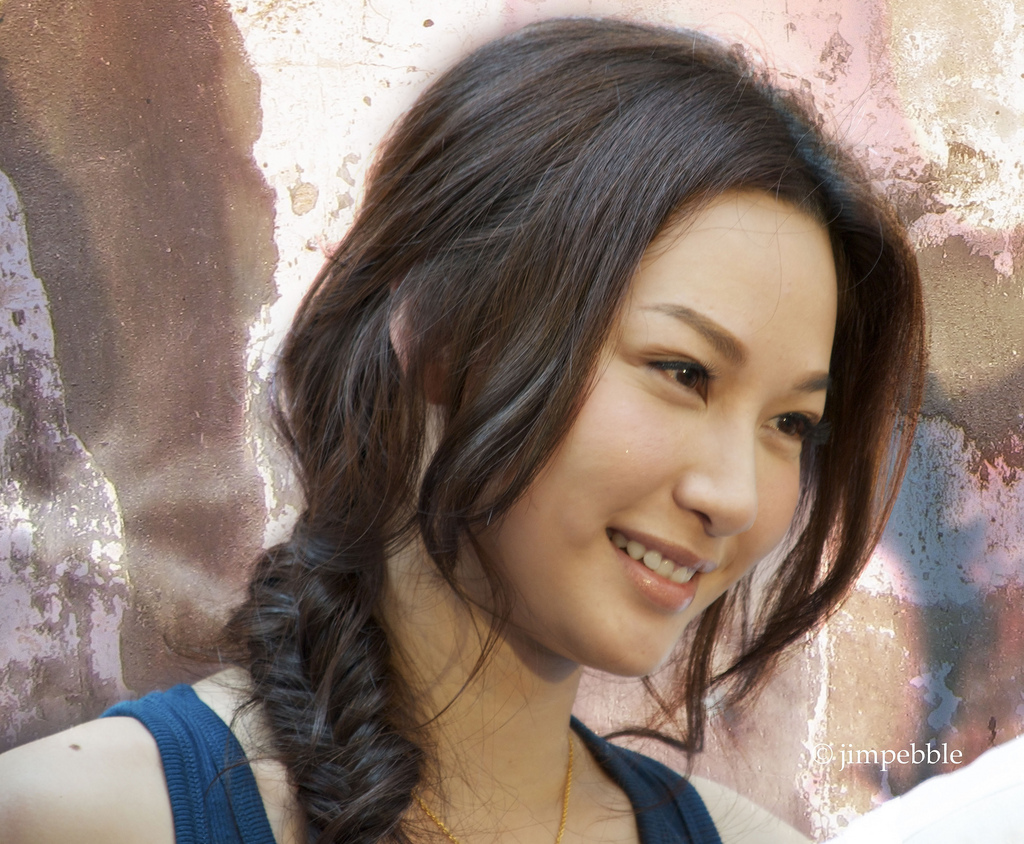
Kate Tsui won in 2012 for her portrayal of Pat Chan in Highs and Lows.

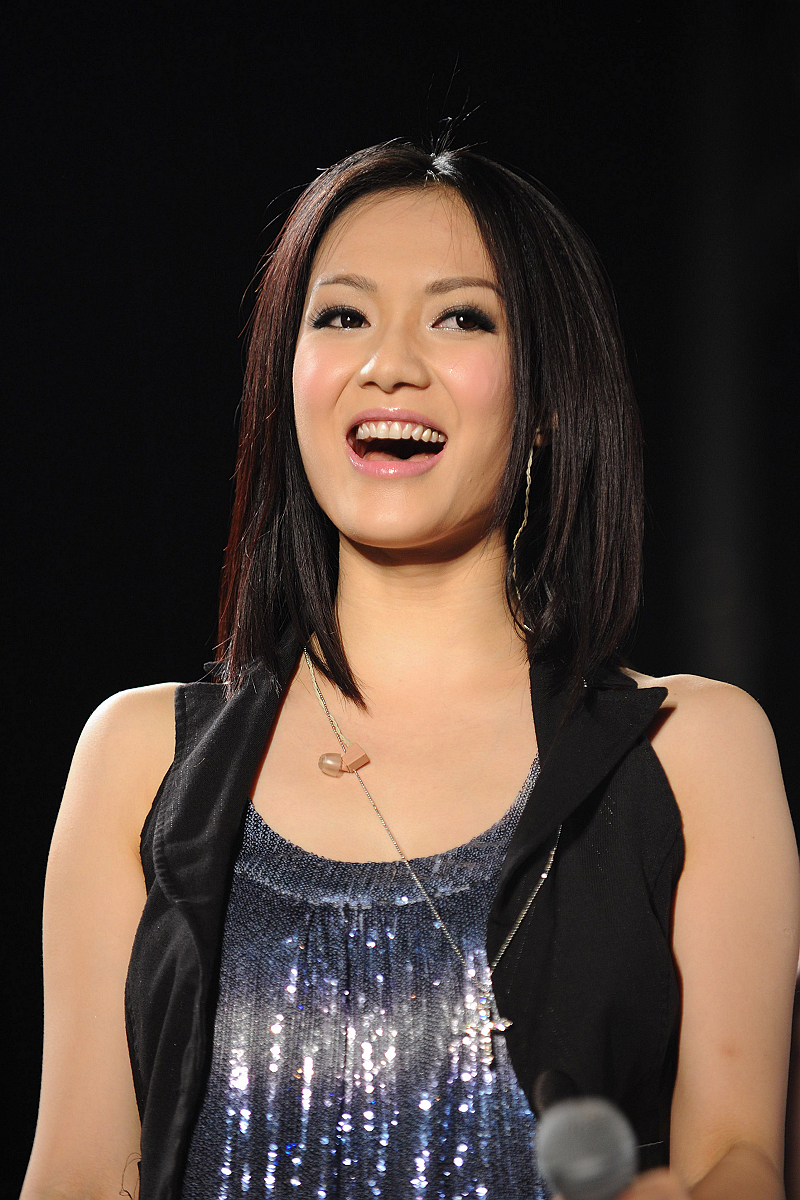
Grace Wong won in 2016 for her portrayal of Fa Man in A Fist Within Four Walls.

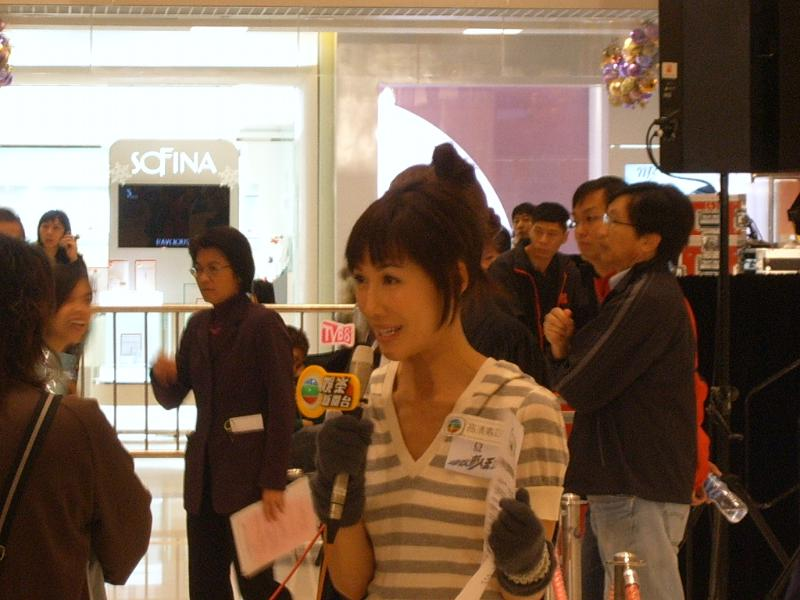
Selena Lee won in 2019 for her performance in Barrack O'Karma.

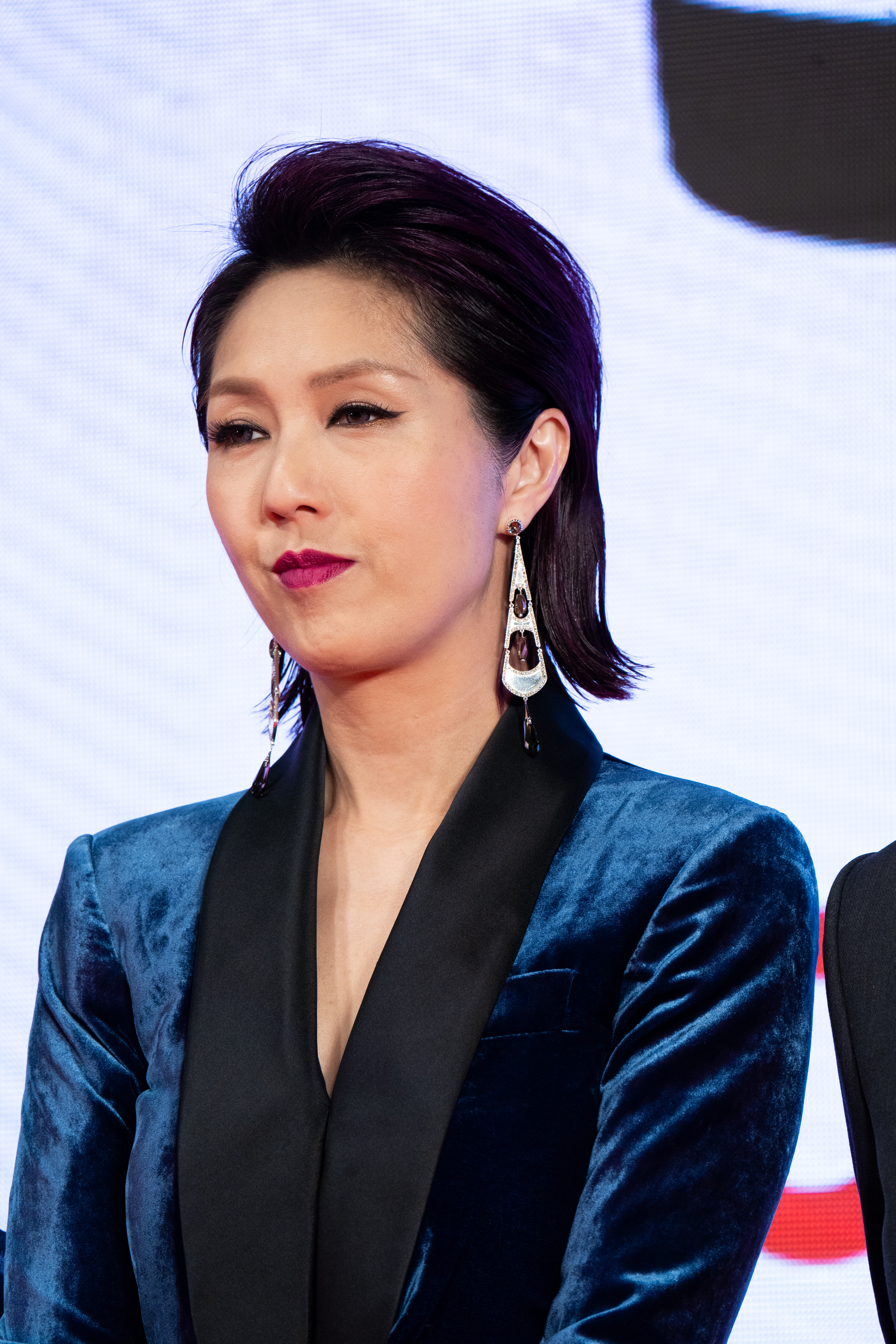
Miriam Yeung won in 2019 for her portrayal of Lam Fei in Wonder Women.

TVB nominates at least ten actresses for the category each year. The following table lists only the actresses who have made it to the top five nominations during the designated awards ceremony. There were no top five nominations from 2012 to 2014.

Table key
| † | Indicates the winner |

=== 2000s ===
| Year | Actress | Drama | Role(s) |
2006 (10th)
| 2006 (10th) | Charmaine Sheh † | Maidens' Vow | Ngai Yu-fung / Wang Chi-kwan / Jenny Pak / Tai Sze-ka |
| 2006 (10th) | Niki Chow | Under the Canopy of Love | Fiona Ko |
| 2006 (10th) | Sheren Tang | La Femme Desperado | Hilda Hoi |
| 2006 (10th) | Gigi Lai | The Dance of Passion | Kai Ming-fung |
| 2006 (10th) | Myolie Wu | To Grow with Love | Tina Ho |
2007 (11th)
| 2007 (11th) | Susanna Kwan † | Heart of Greed | Wong Sau-kam |
| 2007 (11th) | Charmaine Sheh | Glittering Days | Chu Yuk-lan |
| 2007 (11th) | Louise Lee | Heart of Greed | Ling Hau |
| 2007 (11th) | Linda Chung | Heart of Greed | Sheung Choi-sum |
| 2007 (11th) | Gigi Lai | The Ultimate Crime Fighter | Wong Jing-ying |
2008 (12th)
| 2008 (12th) | Louise Lee † | Moonlight Resonance | Chung Siu-hor |
| 2008 (12th) | Charmaine Sheh | Word Twisters' Adventures | Naplan Ching-ching |
| 2008 (12th) | Susanna Kwan | Moonlight Resonance | Chung Siu-sa |
| 2008 (12th) | Fala Chen | Moonlight Resonance | Kam Wing-Hing |
| 2008 (12th) | Linda Chung | Legend of the Demigods | Gai Choi-chi (Sister Ho Choi) |
2009 (13th)
| 2009 (13th) | Tavia Yeung † | Beyond the Realm of Conscience | Yiu Kam-ling |
| 2009 (13th) | Teresa Mo | Off Pedder | Yan Sheung |
| 2009 (13th) | Sheren Tang | Rosy Business | Hong Po-kei |
| 2009 (13th) | Charmaine Sheh | You're Hired | Lam Miu-miu |
| 2009 (13th) | Charmaine Sheh | Beyond the Realm of Conscience | Lau Sam-ho |

=== 2010s ===
| Year | Actress | Drama | Role(s) |
2010 (14th)
| 2010 (14th) | Charmaine Sheh † | Can't Buy Me Love | Princess Chiu-yeung |
| 2010 (14th) | Tavia Yeung | The Mysteries of Love | Tsui Siu-lai |
| 2010 (14th) | Teresa Mo | Some Day | Tseng Kiu |
| 2010 (14th) | Linda Chung | Can't Buy Me Love | Ng Sei-tak |
| 2010 (14th) | Sheren Tang | No Regrets | Cheng Kau-mui (Miss Kau) |
2011 (15th)
| 2011 (15th) | Myolie Wu † | Ghetto Justice | Kris Wong |
| 2011 (15th) | Linda Chung | Yes, Sir. Sorry, Sir! | Carman "Miss Cool" Koo |
| 2011 (15th) | Fala Chen | Lives of Omission | WSIP Jodie "Madam Jo" Chau |
| 2011 (15th) | Maggie Cheung Ho-yee | Forensic Heroes III | Dr. Mandy Chung |
| 2011 (15th) | Aimee Chan | Forensic Heroes III | Angel Chiang |
2012 (16th)
| 2012 (16th) | Kate Tsui † | Highs and Lows | Pat Chan |
| 2012 (16th) | Tavia Yeung | The Hippocratic Crush | Fan Tze Yu |
| 2012 (16th) | Tavia Yeung | Silver Spoon, Sterling Shackles | Hong Tze Kwan |
| 2012 (16th) | Myolie Wu | Ghetto Justice II | Kris Wong |
| 2012 (16th) | Michelle Yim | The Confidant | Empress Dowager Cixi |
2013 (17th)
| 2013 (17th) | Kristal Tin † | Brother's Keeper | Yiu Man-ying |
| 2013 (17th) | Fala Chen | Triumph in the Skies II | Holiday Ho |
| 2013 (17th) | Linda Chung | Brother's Keeper | Rachel Cheuk |
| 2013 (17th) | Tavia Yeung | The Hippocratic Crush II | Fan Tze Yu |
| 2013 (17th) | Kate Tsui | Bounty Lady | Jennifer Shing |
2014 (18th)
| 2014 (18th) | Charmaine Sheh † | Line Walker | Ting Siu-ka |
| 2014 (18th) | Priscilla Wong | Swipe Tap Love | Yu Chor Kin |
| 2014 (18th) | Kristal Tin | Black Heart White Soul | Tam Mei Ching |
| 2014 (18th) | Linda Chung | Tiger Cubs II | Chung Wai Yan |
| 2014 (18th) | Ivana Wong | Come On, Cousin | Lam Suet |
2015 (19th)
| 2015 (19th) | Kristal Tin † | Ghost of Relativity | May Suen |
| 2015 (19th) | Priscilla Wong | Madam Cutie On Duty | Apple Fa |
| 2015 (19th) | Linda Chung | Limelight Years | Szeto Tik-tik |
| 2015 (19th) | Nancy Wu | Ghost of Relativity | Gin Keung |
| 2015 (19th) | Alice Chan | Lord of Shanghai | Yiu Gwai-sang |
2016 (20th)
| 2016 (20th) | Grace Wong † | A Fist Within Four Walls | Fa Man |
| 2016 (20th) | Natalie Tong | Speed of Life | Yiu Yiu |
| 2016 (20th) | Tracy Chu | Over Run Over | Ling Sun-fung |
| 2016 (20th) | Joyce Tang | House of Spirits | Po Yan |
| 2016 (20th) | Nancy Wu | A Fist Within Four Walls | Tiu Lan |
2017 (21st)
| 2017 (21st) | Sisley Choi † | Legal Mavericks | Deanie "Dino" Chiu |
| 2017 (21st) | Natalie Tong | My Unfair Lady | Cherry Ling |
| 2017 (21st) | Nancy Wu | The Unholy Alliance | Yuen Ching-yan |
| 2017 (21st) | Mandy Wong | The Exorcist's Meter | Chong Chi-yeuk |
| 2017 (21st) | Ali Lee | My Ages Apart | Paris Sheung |
2018 (22nd)
| 2018 (22nd) | Alice Chan † | Deep in the Realm of Conscience | Princess Taiping |
| 2018 (22nd) | Mandy Wong | Threesome | Fong Yi Yan (Evie) / Piña Colada / Sau Mak Mak |
| 2018 (22nd) | Nancy Wu | Deep in the Realm of Conscience | Empress Wang (Xuanzong) |
| 2018 (22nd) | Ali Lee | Who Wants a Baby? | Ellen Tong |
| 2018 (22nd) | Grace Wong | OMG, Your Honour | Ophelia Mok |
2019 (23rd)
| 2019 (23rd) | Selena Lee † | Barrack O'Karma | Coco Yeung / Alexandra "Alex" Cheung |
| 2019 (23rd) | Miriam Yeung † | Wonder Women | Lam Fei |
| 2019 (23rd) | Mandy Lam | Come Home Love: Lo and Behold | Linda Lung |
| 2019 (23rd) | Natalie Tong | Big White Duel | Zoe So |
| 2019 (23rd) | Rebecca Zhu | Wonder Women | Ma Si-lui |

=== 2020s ===
| Year | Actress | Drama | Role(s) |
|---|---|---|---|
| 2020 (24th) | Katy Kung † | Hong Kong Love Stories | Katy Yau Hoi Kei |
| 2020 (24th) | Ali Lee | Death By Zero | Chin Hoeng Sai |
| 2020 (24th) | Winki Lai | Al Cappuccino | Chiang Chin-Ha |
| 2020 (24th) | Kelly Cheung | The Witness | Chris Lee Chung Ying |
| 2020 (24th) | Sisley Choi | Line Walker: Bull Fight | Dau Nga Hei |
| 2021 (25th) | Ali Lee † | Beauty and the Boss | Amelia Wong Lai-Mei |
| 2021 (25th) | Joyce Tang | Come Home Love: Lo and Behold | Hung Sheung Sin |
| 2021 (25th) | Lesley Chiang | Come Home Love: Lo and Behold | Liza |
| 2021 (25th) | Rosina Lam | Sinister Beings | Ma Wing-Sze |
| 2021 (25th) | Linda Chung | Kids' Lives Matter | Eman Cheung Yi-Sum |
| 2022 (26th) | Amy Fan Yik Man † | Come Home Love: Lo and Behold | Cindy Pak Tin Ngo |
| 2022 (26th) | Moon Lau | The War of Beauties | Lee Ching-Yi |
| 2022 (26th) | Elena Kong | Get On A Flat | Karen Mok Man-Wai |
| 2022 (26th) | Rosita Kwok | Get On A Flat | Che Chin Chin |
| 2022 (26th) | Erica Chan | Hello Missfortune | Poon Siu-Yu |

== Award record ==
Double winner

| Wins | Actress |
|---|---|
| 1 | Selena Li, Miriam Yeung |

Most wins

| Wins | Actress |
|---|---|
| 3 | Charmaine Sheh |
| 2 | Kristal Tin |

Most top 5 nominations

| Nominations | Actress |
|---|---|
| 7 | Charmaine Sheh |
| 7 | Linda Chung |
| 5 | Tavia Yeung |

Age superlatives

| Record | Actress | TV drama | Age (in years) |
|---|---|---|---|
| Oldest winner | Louise Lee | Moonlight Resonance | 58 |
| Oldest top 5 nominee | Louise Lee | Moonlight Resonance | 58 |
| Youngest winner | Sisley Choi | Legal Mavericks | 26 |
| Youngest top 5 nominee | Linda Chung | Heart of Greed | 23 |

== See also ==
- List of Asian television awards
