= Rebecca Chan =

Hong Kong actress

- Born: October 20, 1958 (age 67); Hong Kong
- Occupation: Actress
- Years active: 1982–present

Chinese name
- Traditional Chinese: 陳秀珠
- Simplified Chinese: 陈秀珠
Transcriptions
Standard Mandarin
- Hanyu Pinyin: Chén Xìu Zhū
Yue: Cantonese
- Jyutping: Chan3 Sau4 Chu1

Rebecca Chan Sau Chu (born October 20, 1958) is a Hong Kong actress best known for her works with the television network TVB such as hit series War and Beauty where she played the main villain. She joined TVB in 1979, when she competed at the Miss Hong Kong 1979 pageant. She finished as a top 10 semifinalist. She left TVB in 1990, rejoined in 1995 and left again in July 2020.

== Filmography ==
Year	Title	Role	TVB Anniversary Awards
1982	The Legend of Master So		
1982	Love with Many Phases	Chong Yik Ling	
1983	The Legend of the Condor Heroes - The Eastern Heretic and Western Venom	Ching Yiu-ka	
1984	The Smiling, Proud Wanderer	Yam Ying-ying	
1985	The Sword Stained with Royal Blood	Ho Tit-sau	
1985	The Flying Fox of Snowy Mountain	Nam Nan	
1985	The Return of Luk Siu-fung	Pak Ching-ching	
1987	The Grand Canal	Chan Mei-leung	
1987	The Seasons	Yip Ching	
1987	The Final Verdict	Ma Yue-sin (Cindy)	
1995	Detective Investigation Files II	Yeung Hiu-ching (Betty)	
1996	Food of Love	Man Nga-chung	
1996	Journey to the West	Princess Iron Fan	
1998	As Sure as Fate	Au-yeung Fung	
1998	Journey to the West II	Princess Iron Fan	
1999	Detective Investigation Files IV	Lau Lin-heung	
2000	The Legendary Four Aces	Chan Chiu-yung	
2001	Country Spirit	Kuk Ying-fun	
2002	Square Pegs	Lau Seung-seung	
2003	Ups and Downs in the Sea of Love	Ma Oi-ling	
2003	Triumph in the Skies	Tina Yip	
2004	War and Beauty	Empress	
2005	My Family	Wong Mei-sin	Nominated the 2005 TVB Anniversary Award for Best Supporting Actress (Top 5)
2005	Revolving Doors of Vengeance	Lam Shuet-hing	
2005	Into Thin Air	Koon Sau-Wah	
2006	Men in Pain	Wong Tak-lan	Nominated the 2006 TVB Anniversary Award for Best Supporting Actress (Top 5)
2007	A Change of Destiny	Yuen Tze-yan	
2007-2008	Survivor's Law II	Chin Siu-ham (Brenda)	
2008	The Silver Chamber of Sorrows	Lin Nin-wong	
2008-2009	The Gem of Life	Yu Wai-ting (Melissa)	
2009	Burning Flame III	Shum Yue-wah	
2009	You're Hired	Mak Man-yin	
2010	Ghost Writer	Yip Wing-han	
2010	Gun Metal Grey	Kan Chuk-kwan	
2010	Twilight Investigation	Gei Ho-yan	
2011	The Other Truth	Shiu Man-wai	
2011	Curse of the Royal Harem	Lady Shu	
2011-2012	Bottled Passion	Tung Kwok-hing	
2012	The Greatness of a Hero	Empress Mo	
2012	Master of Play	Angela Mok Lai-hin	
2013	Reality Check	Ha Siu-han	
2014	Swipe Tap Love	Lo Oi-lam	
2016	K9 Cop	Chung Wai-kin	
2017	Burning Hands	Yau Yuen Wah (Celine)	
2017	Nothing Special Force	Lung Piu Piu	
2018	Who Wants A Baby	Leung Yuet Sim (Christina)	
2019	Flying Tiger 2	Lam Wai	
2019	Sweet Tai Chi	Wei Chu's grandmother	
2021	Final Destiny	Duk Gu Yu	

== Variety show (TVB) ==
- 1981: Sports World TVB
- 1983: Enjoy Yourself Tonight (EYT)
- 1989: 10 Anniversary of Guangzhou Chinese New Year Celebration
