= Return of the Silver Tongue =

- Poster
- 舌劍上的公堂
- Genre: Period drama, Historical fiction, Comedy, Law
- Created by: Hong Kong Television Broadcasts Limited
- Written by: Hui Ka Yu 許嘉瑜; Wong Ji Yen 黃智欣; Ko Wai Man 高慧敏; Tang Si Ting 鄧斯婷; Calif Chong 莊藝文; Louie Sau Lin 雷秀蓮; Yung Sin Jing 翁善瑩; Pun Hoi Yen 潘凱恩
- Starring: Roger Kwok 郭晉安; Kristal Tin 田蕊妮; Priscilla Wong 黃翠如; Evergreen Mak 麥長青; Jerry Lamb 林曉峰; Henry Lee 李成昌; KK Cheung Kwok Keung 張國強; Fred Cheng 鄭俊弘
- Opening theme: Two Words 兩句 - Fred Cheng 鄭俊弘 & Kristal Tin 田蕊妮
- Composer: Yip Siu Chung 葉肇中
- Country of origin: Hong Kong
- Original language: Cantonese Chinese
- No. of episodes: 25

Production
- Producer: Lee Yim Fong 李艷芳
- Production location: Hong Kong
- Editor: Lau Kei Wah 劉枝華
- Camera setup: Multi-camera
- Production company: TVB

Original release
- Network: Jade; HD Jade
- Release: 17 December 2013 – 10 January 2014

Related
- The Hippocratic Crush II On Call 36小時II; Outbound Love 單戀雙城

Return of the Silver Tongue (Traditional Chinese: 舌劍上的公堂; literally "Courtroom Tongue Sword") (Chinese: 舌劍上的公堂; Jyutping: Sit6 gim3 soeng6 dik1 gung1 tong4) is a 2013 till 2014 Hong Kong drama series produced by TVB, starring Roger Kwok and Kristal Tin as the main leads, with Priscilla Wong, Evergreen Mak, Jerry Lamb, Henry Lee, KK Cheung Kwok Keung and Fred Cheng in main supporting roles. The series is produced by Lee Yim Fong. Filming began in February 2013 and finished in late May 2013. The costume fitting was held on February 21. The drama is based during the Qing dynasty, and loosely based on a short story in the classical Chinese novel Little Bean Shed (小豆棚), by Qing dynasty female novelist, Zeng Yandong 曾衍東.

== Synopsis ==
Scholar Cheung Sei Wai (Roger Kwok), opens a school to cultivate new educated talents. He is good friends with his student Chow Kuk (Priscilla Wong) who, though brilliant in her own right, is not very good in school. Sei Wai is righteous and genuinely believes that education can purify one's mind and heart.

He meets the ambitious and articulate Chan Jan Jan (Kristal Tin), a female lawyer, and quickly befriends her. As Sei Wai also has an interest in the legal business, he and Jan Jan become close working partners. The villainous Poon King Chuen (Cheung Kwok Keung) and his son Poon Yi Ming (Jerry Lamb) consider Sei Wai and Jan Jan their enemies, and often cause trouble for the pair.

Sei Wai's good friend, the court guard Ha Hau Mo (Evergreen Mak), dislikes lawyers and Jan Jan, as her father Chan Mung Kat (Li Shing Cheong) framed his father, who ultimately received capital punishment. Believing that Jan Jan is more than what meets the eye, he launches an investigation on her. A 20-year-old cold case is brought back to light again.

== Cast ==
- Roger Kwok as Cheung Sei Wai a teacher then a barrister, Chan Jan Jan’s love interest. Later becomes her husband.
- Kristal Tin as Chan Jan Jan, Cheung Sei Wai's and Ha-Hau Mu's love interest. Chan Mung Kat's daughter. Later, becomes Cheung Sei Wai's wife.
- Priscilla Wong as Chow Kuk
- Evergreen Mak as Ha-Hau Mu, a head detective. Chan Jan Jan’s love interest, but eventually becomes Suen Cho Cho's husband.
- Jerry Lamb as Poon Yi Ming, Poon King Chuen’s son. Constantly shamed by his father for being deaf, he later learns to read lips. Later becomes Ah To's husband.
- Henry Lee as Chan Mung Kat, Chan Chun Chun's father. Poon King Chuen’s rival.
- KK Cheung as Poon King Chuen (nickname Fong Tong Geng). A famous barrister and Fong Yi Ming's father. Chan Mung Kat's rival. Later, executed in the final episode.
- Fred Cheng as Choi To Wah
- Whitney Hui as Ah To, a maid in the Poon family who is mute. Poon Yi Ming's wife.
- Grace Wong as Suen Cho Cho and Ha-Hau Mu's wife.
- Rachel Kan as Chow Lan, Chow Kuk’s older sister
- Yu Yeung as Kau Ching Ko
- Yu Chi-ming as Lo Piu
- Suet Nei as Pau Heung
- Akina Hong as Koon Hei Fung, local songstress. Later revealed to be Fan Kang’s mother.
- Jonathan Cheung as Fan Kang, a scholar who becomes Poon King Chuen’s apprentice and godson. Later revealed to be Poon King Chuen’s illegitimate son.

== Ratings ==
Week	Episodes	Date	Average Points	Peaking Points
1	01－04	December 17–20, 2013	25	28
2	05－09	December 23–27, 2013	24	27
3	10－14	December 30, 2013 - January 3, 2014	25	28
4	15－19	January 6–10, 2014	26	29
5	20－25	January 13–17, 2014	26	31

== Development ==
Roger Kwok reportedly turned down the role of "Yinzhen, the Fourth Imperial Prince (四皇爺胤禛)" in Gilded Chopsticks and the chance to reunite with his Inbound Troubles co-stars to take on the lead in Return of the Silver Tongue.

== International broadcast ==
- Malaysia - 8TV (Malaysia)
