= Karma Rider =

2013 Hong Kong ancient crime television drama

- Promo poster
- Also known as: Master, Understood
- 師父·明白了
- Genre: Ancient, Crime, Love, Drama
- Created by: Hong Kong Television Broadcasts Limited
- Written by: Shek Hoi Ting
- Starring: Raymond Wong Ho-yin; Priscilla Wong; Matt Yeung; Evergreen Mak; Kaki Leung; Cilla Kung; Helena Law; Yoyo Chen; Cheung Kwok Keung; Benjamin Yuen; Matthew Ko; Rachel Kan; Kenny Wong
- Opening theme: Understand 明白了 by Hubert Wu
- Country of origin: Hong Kong
- Original languages: Cantonese; Mandarin
- No. of episodes: 20

Production
- Producer: Chan Yiu Chuen
- Running time: 45 minutes (per episode)
- Production company: TVB

Original release
- Network: TVB Jade
- Release: 15 July – 9 August 2013

Related
- Awfully Lawful; Always and Ever

Karma Rider
- Chinese: 師父·明白了
- Literal meaning: Master, Understood
Transcriptions

Karma Rider (Chinese: 師父·明白了; Jyutping: Si fu ming bak liu literally "Master, Understood") is a 2013 Hong Kong ancient crime television drama produced by TVB, starring Raymond Wong and Priscilla Wong as the main leads with Matt Yeung, Evergreen Mak, Kaki Leung, Cilla Kung, Helena Law, Yoyo Chen, Cheung Kwok Keung, Benjamin Yuen, Matthew Ko, Rachel Kan and Kenny Wong in major supporting roles. It was broadcast between July and August of 2013.

== Synopsis ==
Chor Yat Chin (Raymond Wong) was saved by a kind-hearted man when he was young and since then, his life ambition was to become the world’s best constable. His training and hard work paid off when he solved a mystery case on his first day of work. However, his superior, Ching Ying Hung (Mat Yeung), did not approve of Yat Chin's methods of solving the case, as he was a man who strictly kept to the rules, hence the two do not get along well in the Yamen. As another murder case arose, Yat Chin must enter Ma Heung Town's forbidden territory: Kau Lau Village. It is known among the town that criminals live in the village, and no constable or official, even the Emperor himself, can enter the place. However, Yat Chin encounters Foon Hei (Priscilla Wong), a pickpocket who saves him numerous times, and she helps him infiltrate the Village.

Along the way, Yat Chin also come across Wan Tin Bong (Evergreen Mak), an odd man who is linked to Yat Chin's past and is the core suspect of the murder case. With the murder case on his hands, Yat Chin begins to have dreams of himself as Liang Shanbo from the Butterfly Lovers legend. The dream indicates that he is the reincarnation of Liang Shanbo, but with the sudden appearance of the daughter of a wealthy merchant, Wu Deep (Yoyo Chen), Yat Chin is unable to tell who his predestined partner and the reincarnation of Zhu Yingtai is: Foon Hei, or Wu Deep?

== Cast ==
=== The Scallion Household ===
| Cast | Role | Description |
|---|---|---|
| Law Lan | Foon Shu/Lang Nu Pretty | An elderly woman who sells scallion cakes at a small stall in East Kau Lau of Kau Lau Village She lost four of her own biological children and so adopted four others: Foon Ching, Foon Hei, Foon Tim and Foon Siu |
| Kaki Leung | Foon Ching Silence | The oldest of the Four Scallion Sisters She is mute Adopted by Foon Shu/Lang Nu A pickpocket She can play the flute Lives in East Kau Lau of Kau Lau Village She falls in love with a man the girls nicknamed as Silent Hero |
| Priscilla Wong | Foon Hei Cheery | The second oldest of the Four Scallion Sisters Adopted by Foon Shu/Lang Nu A pickpocket Lives in East Kau Lau of Kau Lau Village She likes Chor Yat Chin She dies in Episode 20 due to an illness She loves and strongly believes in the Legend of the Butterfly Lovers Metaphorically, she is believed to be the reincarnation of Zhu Yingtai from the Legend of the Butterlfy Lovers |
| Mikako Leung | Foon Tim Sickie/Sweetie | The third oldest of the Four Scallion Sisters She is sickly Adopted by Foon Shu/Lang Nu A pickpocket Lives in East Kau Lau of Kau Lau Village |
| Cilla Kung | Foon Siu Smiley | The fourth oldest of the Four Scallion Sisters She is known for her 'Beautiful Kick' She is feisty and always wants to be pretty Adopted by Foon Shu/Lang Nu A pickpocket Lives in East Kau Lau of Kau Lau Village She falls in love with Bak Hok Yee She committed suicide in Episode 16 |

=== Ma Heung Town Yamen ===
| Cast | Role | Description |
|---|---|---|
| Raymond Wong Ho-yin | Chor Yat Chin Bald Boy | He is a constable He is a newcomer to Ma Heung Town He is wrapped up in a slight love triangle with Wu Deep and Foon Hei He loves Foon Hei After saving Bak Yat Yat from an assassination, he is rewarded with a pass where he can enter Kau Lau Village at will Metaphorically, he is the reincarnation of Liang Shanbo of the Legend of the Butterfly Lovers He has a strong interest to butterflies |
| Mat Yeung | Ching Ying Hung | He is the Head Constable of Ma Heung Town Yamen It is believed he ends up with Wan Yau in the end He and Chor Yat Chin initially were not on good terms but they soon developed a strong bond of companionship and brotherhood He is the type of guy that goes by the books |
| Whitney Hui | Wan Yau | She is a constable under Ching Ying Hung She has a crush on Ching Ying Hung and so always listens to him Supposedly, she ends up with Ching Ying Hung in the end |

=== Chun Fa Bathhouse ===
| Cast | Role | Description |
|---|---|---|
| Evergreen Mak | Wan Tin Bong Fatty | He is an employee of Chun Fa Bathhouse His mentor is God He is good friends with Chor Yat Chin and Foon Hei (they are a team) His relationship with Chun Fa is ambiguous, somewhat between romantic and strong friendship He can see someone's fate through butterflies Lives in East Kau Lau of Kau Lau Village |
| Rachel Kan | Hoi Chun Fa Lady Boss | She is the lady owner of Chun Fa Bathhouse She cares deeply for Wan Tin Bong |

=== East Kau Lau ===
| Cast | Role | Description |
|---|---|---|
| Willie Wai | Bak Yat Yat Tung Ye | Controls the east side of Kau Lau Village He is very loyal, having stayed faithful to his deceased wife He loves his son and hopes that he never becomes like him Very respectful to elderly people He initially hates Chor Yat Chin because he is a constable (and bald). However, they become friends afterwards Lives in East Kau Lau of Kau Lau Village He dislikes the fact that his son likes Foon Siu because he hopes his son would marry a proper woman with adequate education and of the same social status |
| Owen Cheung | Bak Hok Yee HY | He is the scholar son of Bak Yat Yat He falls in love with Foon Siu He was unintentionally killed by Ngan Yee in Episode 14, leading to Foon Siu's subsequent suicide |
| Amy Fan | Mok Sau Si | She works at the small restaurant which plays the Butterfly Lovers opera that Foon Hei really likes She and Foon Hei have a past together, and they subsequently become friends She and Lok Mou Ngai were a couple but due to various reasons they are separated She becomes blind in the end Lives in East Kau Lau of Kau Lau Village Katy Kung plays young Mok Sau Si |
| KK Cheung | Lok Mou Ngai Grey Hair Doctor | He was initially in a relationship with Mok Sau Si After Mok Sau Si was forced into an arranged marriage, he became a monk and saved Chor Yat Chin He moves into East Kau Lau of Kau Lau Village to watch Mok Sau Si He poses as a doctor and becomes connected with Chor Yat Chin and Foon Hei Benjamin Yuen plays young Lou Mou Ngai |

=== Others ===
| Cast | Role | Description |
|---|---|---|
| Yen To Yin-Gor | Wun Tin Sang | Main Villain After asking Kong Tai Ping to kill the previous mayor of Ma Heung Town, he was elected as the next mayor He has hopes of taking over the whole of Ma Heung Town including Kau Lau Village, where even the emperor has no control over, and kills three of the masters of Kau Lau Village: North, South and West. He was unsuccessful in killing East's master, Bak Yat Yat He is the first and oldest biological son of Foon Shu He is Kong Tai Ping, Dong Mei and Ngan Yee's half brother He committed suicide in Episode 19 |
| Jonathan Cheung | Kong Tai Ping | He is a masked assassin with a blind right eye He follows the orders of Wun Tin Sang—they are brothers of the same mother but different father He was manipulated by Wun Tin Sang He is Foon Shu's youngest biological son and third child He is Dong Mei and Ngan Yee's blood brother He was convicted to jail in the end with several guilts of murder |
| Meini Cheung | Dong Mei | She was hired by Wun Tin Sang to feed the constables fake testimony for Wan Tin Bong's murder case She is Foon Shu's oldest daughter and second child She is Kong Tai Ping and Ngan Yee's blood sister She and Ngan Yee are wrapped up in a kidnapping case and was convicted to jail in the end She also killed Ngan Yee's boyfriend |
| Candice Chiu | Ngan Yee | She is Wu Deep's personal maid Her boyfriend tricked her into the real kidnapping of Wu Deep (which was initially a stage kidnapping) She unintentionally killed Bak Hok Yee She is Foon Shu's youngest daughter and fourth child She is Kong Tai Ping and Dong Mei's blood sister |
| Yoyo Chen | Wu Deep Shek Shek | The rich daughter of a businessman She was kidnapped as a child and met Chor Yat Chin, who gave her the name Shek Shek She falls in love with Chor Yat Chin and is somewhat the indirect cause of Bak Hok Yee's death |
| Kenny Wong | Silent Hero | Guest Star He is romantically linked to Foon Ching |

== Viewership ratings ==
| Week | Episode | Date | Average ratings | Peak rating |
|---|---|---|---|---|
| 1 | 01－05 | July 15–19, 2013 | 25 | 30 |
| 2 | 06－10 | July 22–26, 2013 | 24 | 28 |
| 3 | 11－15 | July 29 －Aug 2, 2013 | 22 | 27 |
| 4 | 16－20 | Aug 5 － 9, 2013 | 23 | 26 |
