= Stanley Cheung =

Hong Kong actor, singer, and presenter

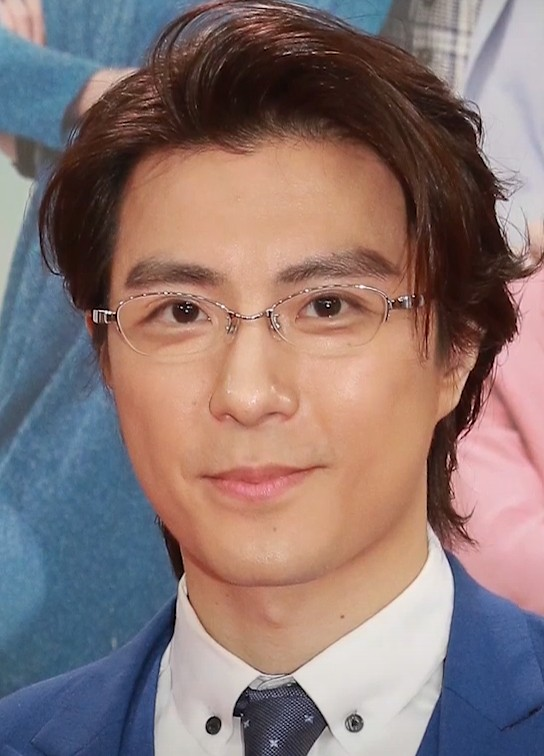
- Cheung in July 2019
- Born: Hong Kong
- Occupations: Actor; singer; presenter
- Years active: 2002–present

Chinese name
- Traditional Chinese: 張景淳
- Simplified Chinese: 张景淳
Transcriptions
Standard Mandarin
- Hanyu Pinyin: Zhāng Jǐngchún
Yue: Cantonese
- Jyutping: Zoeng1 Ging2 Seon4
- Musical career
- Formerly of: Cheers

Stanley Cheung King-shun is a Hong Kong actor, singer, and presenter. In 2003, Cheung debuted as a member of the short lived boy band Cheers, which won Hong Kong's Best New Artist at Shanghai's Asian Music Festival in 2003. In 2006, Cheung auditioned for TVbeople, a talent casting system hosted by TVB, and was selected to sign a two-year artiste contract with the company along with six other winners. Before acting in dramas, Cheung has hosted several entertainment programmes for TVB. Cheung is perhaps best known for his role as Ka-ming in the 2011 drama serial When Heaven Burns.

== Filmography ==
=== Films ===
Title	Year	Role	Notes
72 Tenants of Prosperity	2010	Customer neighbour	
Perfect Wedding	2010	Louis' friend	
Blue Magic	2013		

=== Television ===
Television dramas
Title	Year	Role	Notes
My Better Half	2010	Japanese high school student	
In the Eye of the Beholder	2010	Scholar	
OL Supreme	2010	Customer	
Sisters of Pearl	2010	Court assistant	
Can't Buy Me Love	2010	Eunuch Hon	
Home Troopers	2010	Employee	
Grace Under Fire	2011	Office worker	
Yes, Sir. Sorry, Sir!	2011	Bat Kau Yan High School student	
The Other Truth	2011	Kwai Jai	
Lives of Omission	2011	gangster	
Forensic Heroes III	2011	Eric Lau Man-kit	
When Heaven Burns	2011–12	Hui Ka-ming	
Let It Be Love	2011	Hugo	
Daddy Good Deeds	2012	Wong Wai-leung	
Master of Play	2012	"Man" Lee Chor-man	
Witness Insecurity	2012	young Sapura	
Three Kingdoms RPG	2012	Gap Se Long	Episode 20
King Maker	2012	Government official	
The Confidant	2012	Hong Yau-wai	
Reality Check	2013	Wong Wai-hong	
Beauty at War	2013	Sit Tung-shing	
Shades of Life	2014	Kwong Chi Hung	Episode 7
Rear Mirror	2014	Ryan Yiu Ngai Suan	
Madam Cutie On Duty	2015	Mak Ga Lun	
Limelight Years	2015	Diamond	
Wudang Rules	2015	Cheung Ka-chun	
Under the Veil	2015	Chiu Shing Chi the Crown Prince	
The Executioner	2015–16	Chenghua Emperor	
The Last Healer in Forbidden City	2016	Yam Sek-gang	
Presumed Accidents	2016	Simon Yung Sei-man	
Come Home Love: Lo and Behold	2017-now	Gung Yip	
Line Walker: The Prelude	2017	Airplane	
Flying Tiger	2018	She Zhuohui (Coke)	

Hosting programmes
Title	Year	Role	Notes
Scoop	2008–09	Presenter	
Pleasure & Leisure	2009	Host	Segment: "Trendy Segment Spots"
E-News Front Line	2011–12	Presenter	
