= Kaki Leung =

KaKi Leung
- Born: 14 July 1981 (age 44); British Hong Kong
- Other names: Leung Ka Ki, Kaki Leung Ka-kei, Yuki
- Occupation: Actress
- Years active: 2003 to now

Kaki Leung (born 14 July 1981) is a Hong Kong television actress and hostess.

== Education ==
In 2003, Leung received a Bachelor of Acting degree with Honors from The Hong Kong Academy for Performing Arts (HKAPA).

== Career ==
Leung was an entertainment news hostess at i-Cable Television Service Ltd from 2003 to 2007. She served Television Broadcasts Limited from 2007 to 2020 and is currently developing her career as a hostess and an actress. She took the role of Fa Yeuk-Bo in Emergency Unit, a popular drama aired in 2009. Kaki has participated in more than 15 dramas in the past 5 years. She also performed in Sand and a Distant Star in the same year. In 2014, she starred in Swipe Tap Love as the character of Natasha. Seeing that Swipe Tap Love became a popular drama, Kaki's participation increased her popularity in Hong Kong. As a hostess, she has also hosted more than 10 programs including Sidewalk Scientist which has been nominated by TVB Awards Presentation 2013 as one of the Best Informative Program Series.

== Filmography ==
=== Television ===
Year	Title	Role	Notes
2015	My "Spiritual" Ex-Lover	young Nip Siu Sin	Ep.4
2015	Madam Cutie On Duty	So Fung Nei	
2014	Come On, Cousin	Snoopy Siu Bo Go	
2014	Swipe Tap Love	Natasha Sung Lau Guen	
2013	Karma Rider	Foon Jing	
2013	Reality Check	Peggy Fong Bui-kei	
2012	The Last Steep Ascent	Chung Lok-ho	
2012	Three Kingdoms RPG	Huang Yueying	
2011	Grace Under Fire	Tong Suet-Kiu	
2010	Twilight Investigation	Ho Lai-ching	
2010	In the Eye of the Beholder	Female constable	Ep. 4
2009	ICAC Investigators 2009	Leung Han Ka	Ep. 1
2009	E.U.	Fa Yeuk Bo	
2009	Burning Flame III	Betty	
2008	Forensic Heroes II	Debby Ho Sau Bing	

Television programs
Year	Title	Role	Notes
2013	Hong Kong So Blessed	Presenter	
2013	Sidewalk Scientist	Presenter	
2010	詭異檔案	Presenter	aired on TVB Lifestyle
2010	通識通通識	Presenter	aired on TVB Kids
2010	Tung Wah Charity Show	Presenter	
2006	The Unbelievable	Presenter	aired on Cable TV

=== Films ===
Year	Title	Role	Notes
1999	Sunshine Cops	student.	
2015	Undercover Duet		
2016	Buddy Cops	Policewoman	
