= Madam Cutie On Duty =

Hong Kong television series

- Official poster
- Also known as: Housewife Madam
- 師奶MADAM
- Genre: Modern, Romance, Comedy, Action
- Created by: Hong Kong Television Broadcasts Limited
- Written by: Ma Ting Man 馬靜雯; Gu Yi Lai 顧依麗; Yung Si Ying 翁善瑩; Lui Ting Ching 呂正清; Lee Man Yun 李敏媛
- Directed by: Cheung Wing Ho 張永豪
- Starring: Edwin Siu 蕭正楠; Priscilla Wong 黃翠如; Raymond Cho 曹永廉; Mandy Wong 黃智雯; Kaki Leung 梁嘉琪; Rachel Kan 簡慕華; Junior Anderson 安德尊
- Opening theme: I'll Always Be Yours by Edwin Siu 蕭正楠
- Country of origin: Hong Kong
- Original language: Cantonese
- No. of episodes: 20

Production
- Executive producer: Catherine Tsang 曾勵珍
- Producer: Lee Yim Fong 李艷芳
- Production location: Hong Kong
- Editor: Wong Gwok Fai 黃國輝
- Camera setup: Multi camera
- Running time: 45 minutes
- Production company: TVB

Original release
- Network: Jade; HD Jade
- Release: 12 January – 6 February 2015

Related
- Officer Geomancer; My "Spiritual" Ex-Lover

Madam Cutie On Duty
- Traditional Chinese: 師奶MADAM
- Literal meaning: "Housewife Madam"
Transcriptions
Standard Mandarin
- Hanyu Pinyin: Shī nǎi MADAM
Yue: Cantonese
- Yale Romanization: Sī Nāai MADAM
- Jyutping: Si1 Naai1 MADAM

Madam Cutie On Duty (Chinese: 師奶MADAM; Jyutping: Si1 Naai1 MADAM; Cantonese Yale: Sī Nāai MADAM; literally "Housewife Madam") is a 2015 Hong Kong modern comedy romance action drama produced by TVB, starring Edwin Siu, Priscilla Wong, Raymond Cho and Mandy Wong as the main cast. Filming of the series took place from November 2013 till January 2014. The series began airing January 12, 2015 and broadcast weekly from Monday to Friday on TVB Jade channel 9:30-10:30 pm timeslot.

== Synopsis ==
Apple Fa Ping (Priscilla Wong) was born into a wealthy family but unfortunate for her she has unflattering looks and was made fun of when she was younger. An accident forced her to undergo cosmetic surgery that made her appearance more attractive. Ever since then her former appearance has given her nightmares making her believe being beautiful is the way of life. Even though she is a materialistic person she still choose to become a police officer for the excitement. When she accidentally volunteers to go undercover, she is partnered with Law Dai Shu (Edwin Siu), a former high school classmate of hers who she had a crush on but broke her heart when he made fun of her looks. The two must pretend to be husband and wife in order to infiltrate housewives that might have been victims of a notorious public housing pimp/loan shark living in the same complex as them. However Fa Ping and Dai Shu can't stand each other but are forced to pretend to be a loving couple in order to gain the trust of the housewives they suspect worked as prostitutes on the side and borrowed money from the pimp/loan shark.

== Cast ==
=== Main cast ===
- Edwin Siu 蕭正楠 as Law Tai Shu 羅大樹

A crass CID sergeant who started off on the wrong foot with Fa Ping when she unexpectedly foiled a prostitution/loan shark case he was working on. He and Fa Ping accidentally put their suspect, a notorious pimp and loan shark operating at a public housing village, in a coma while trying to capture him. The two were forced to partner up and go undercover as pretend husband and wife in order to find victims of the pimp as witnesses to charge and prosecute him. However, he didn't know that Fa Ping was the same unattractive girl that he made fun of in High School. Once undercover his occupation to mask his real identity was a building maintenance person in charge of clearing the building sewer drain pipes. He also became popular with all the older housewives in the building because they thought he looks like Hong Kong actor/singer Edwin Siu, who he thought was super ugly. The housewives called him "Paul" because they said it was not modern to not have an English name.

- Priscilla Wong 黃翠如 as Apple Fa Ping 花蘋

A rich girl who was superficial and materialistic. She cared deeply about her appearance due to her unattractive appearance when she was younger. After an accident involving the stairs and a bicycle, she underwent plastic surgery to improve her appearance. Even with her attitude she chose to be a police officer because of the excitement, which her mother highly objected to. She volunteered to go undercover because her crush Ying Sir was originally supposed to be her partner but due to a leg injury, Law Tai Shu from another squad unit was reassigned as her undercover partner. Fa Ping had a crush on Tai Shu when they were in high school and was going to confess to him but she overheard him making fun of her appearance. From that day on she hated him and vowed to make him eat his words. She started off on the wrong foot with the entire housing village because of an argument she had with the village "big sis" Dan Dan, but later gained their trust when she acted as a friend in need.

- Raymond Cho 曹永廉 as Tong Hon Sze 湯漢斯

Hung Dan Dan's husband and Tong Ling Lei's father. General Manager at an office supply company. He had issues when his wife wanted to get intimate with him which led her to suspect that he might be straying. When his wife heard him speaking English and in the company of a foreign woman she suspected he was having an affair but he was only taking English lessons to improve himself. He felt inferior to his wife because she handled everything for him. Unhappy with his job at the office supply company, he quitted and got a new job.

- Mandy Wong 黃智雯 as Hung Dan Dan 熊丹丹

Tong Hon Sze's wife and Tong Ling Lei's mother. She borrowed money from Wan Bun in order to help pay for her father-in-law's medical bills. Wan Ban blackmailed her and tried to push her into prostituting herself to pay off her loan with scandalous pictures he has of her. She was the "big sis" running the housewives cliche in the building and used her power to get all the housewives and staff from the building to turn against Fa Ping when Fa Ping confronted her about rummaging through her suitcase and taking her pillow, which she denied.

- Kaki Leung 梁嘉琪 as So Fung Nei 蘇鳳妮

Chu Yung Chung's wife and Lee Ho Choi's daughter-in-law. Her husband worked in mainland China and only return home once in a while. Her mother-in-law treated her badly and didn't trust her even though she was a filial daughter-in-law to her. She borrowed money from Wan Bun in order to buy her own facial spa business from her former boss. She and Mak Ka Lun were childhood friends from the same village in China.

- Rachel Kan 簡慕華 as Lau Lin Heung 劉憐香

Dung Tai Zit's mother. A divorcee with a teenage son who she raised on her own. She worked part-time as a stock clerk at the village supermarket. She was highly superstitious and a self proclaimed fortune teller who gave feng-shui advice and fortune readings to the village residents. Not wanting to be an inconvenience to her ex-husband, she borrowed money from Wan Bun in order to register her son for university overseas, but she didn't bother to ask her son if he wants to study abroad causing them to have arguments and misunderstandings.

=== Law family ===
- Li Shing-cheong 李成昌 as Law Bak 羅帛

Law Tai Shu's father and Ga May Yung's estranged husband. He worked as a building security guard. He held a grudge against his estranged wife for stealing the home down payment fund and running out on the family. Later, he was promoted and transferred to the same housing village Tai Shu was working undercover at. Desperate for a daughter-in-law, he quickly got over Dai Shu's break up with his girlfriend when he found out Tai Shu and Fa Ping were pretending to be husband and wife in an undercover assignment, and started seeing Fa Ping as his actual daughter-in-law.

- Mary Hon 韓馬利 as Ga May Yung 賈美蓉

Law Tai Shu's mother and Law Bak's estranged wife. She became over obsessed with plastic surgery because she felt her husband does not find her attractive anymore. She stole the family home down payment money in order to have plastic surgery and then left her young son and husband when a botched surgery left her face disfigured and too embarrassed for her family to see her. She had been living in Japan with the doctor who saved her from suicide all these years and recently returned to Hong Kong.

=== Fa family ===
- Henry Yu 于洋 as Fa Sum 花琛

Fa Ping's father and Wu Dip's husband. An understanding father who spoiled his daughter because he wanted her to be happy. He was also a very supportive husband who helped his wife with her troubles. When he and his wife ran into Fa Ping at the housing village they think their daughter really married a plumber, but unlike his wife, he was willing to accept Tai Shu for his daughter's sake.

- Susan Tse 謝雪心 as Wu Dip 胡蝶

Fa Ping's mother and Fa Sum's wife. An overly protective but loving mother who didn't approve of her daughter being a police officer because of both the dangers associated with the job but also that it was a "rough" job. She sang Hong Kong opera as a hobby and for her charity club. She actively sought "Piu Hung" to be her duet partner because her partner assigned by the charity was arrogant and terrible at singing.

- Lok Yan Ming 駱胤鳴 as Fai Fai 菲菲

Fa Ping's younger cousin.

- Chan Dik Hak 陳狄克 as Duk 德

The Fa family chauffeur.

=== Housing village residence ===
- Rosanne Lui 呂珊 as Mother Chu 朱媽 (Lee Ho Choi 李好彩)

So Fung Nei's mother-in-law and Chu Yung Chung's mother. Everyone at the housing village calls her "Mother Chu". She did not appreciate her daughter-in-law nor trust her. Always thinking Fung Nei would cheat on her son because he worked in mainland China. She felt neglected by her son because he pays more attention to his wife. She was a former Hong Kong opera singer under the stage name "Piu Hung", but gave it up to raise her son when her husband died.

- Ronald Law 羅鈞滿 as Chu Yung Chung 朱潤祥

So Fung Nei's husband and Lee Ho Choi's son. He worked in mainland China as a factory supervisor and is hardly ever home due to his job. When he returned home his mother constantly via for his attention with his wife which caused him to have conflict on whom to side with.

- Hero Yuen 阮政峰 as Dung Tai Zit 鄧大喆

Lau Lin Hoeng's teenage son. He did not appreciate his mother making his life decisions for him, because of this mother and son did not get along and he hardly came home for dinner. Though he sternly talked to his mother, he still loved and cared for his mother very much which caused him to worry about her when he saw her spend so much money on him.

- Audrey Yue 余之之 as Tong Ling Lei 湯伶俐

Tong Hon Si and Hung Dan Dan's young daughter. She stole Fa Ping's precious pillow when both she and her mother rummage through Fa Ping's suitcase. Later when Fa Ping babysat her she returns the pillow. She was actually a very caring and filial daughter who does well in school.

- Shally Tsang 曾慧雲 as Mimi Mui 梅

A housewife that was gossipy and becomes friendly with Law Tai Shu because she thought he looked like Hong Kong actor/singer Edwin Siu. She was one of the "Four beautiful Maiden's" in the housing village, a nickname she and her friends gave themselves.

- Kitty Lau 劉桂芳 as Lily Lan 蘭

A housewife that was gossipy and becomes friendly with Law Tai Shu because she thought he looked like Hong Kong actor/singer Edwin Siu. She was one of the "Four beautiful Maiden's" in the housing village, a nickname she and her friends gave themselves.

- Jenny Wong 黃梓瑋 as Kiki Guk 谷

A housewife that was gossipy and becomes friendly with Law Tai Shu because she thought he looked like Hong Kong actor/singer Edwin Siu. She was one of the "Four beautiful Maiden's" in the housing village, a nickname she and her friends gave themselves.

- Samantha Chuk 祝文君 as Gigi Zuk 祝

A housewife that was gossipy and becomes friendly with Law Dai Shu because she thought he looked like Hong Kong actor/singer Edwin Siu. She was one of the "Four beautiful Maiden's" in the housing village, a nickname she and her friends gave themselves.

- Melanie Wong 黃可盈 as Siu Yun Zi 小丸子

A little girl left home alone while her single mother had to go to work. Law Tai Shu became friends with her. After almost being kidnapped by a deranged child pedophile, the housewives in the housing village band together and offered to look after her while her mother was at work.

- Sam Tsang 曾航生 as Wan Bun 溫斌

A pimp/loan shark that forces housewives into prostituting themselves when they were unable to repay their loan. While fleeing Dai Shu and Fa Ping from being arrested he got involve in a traffic accident and becomes comatose.

- Lee Yee-man 李綺雯 as Wan Cing 溫晴

Wan Bun's younger sister from the mainland. She acted innocent and nice but like her brother she was also shady and a con artist. She used So Fung Nei and her facial spa as a cover up to collect her brother's unpaid loans.

=== Housing village staff ===
- Lily Li 李麗麗 as Mang Po 孟婆

A cleaning lady at the housing village cafe and the garbage lady in charge of the housing village grounds. She was also a residence at the housing village.

- Vincent Cheung 張漢斌 as Bing 炳

A cook at the housing village cafe.

- Kate Tsang 曾琬莎 as Nun 銀

The cashier at the housing village cafe.

- Hoffman Cheng 鄭世豪 as Ng Fat Shui 吳發水

A stock boy at the housing village supermarket. He liked to flirt with attractive female customers. He was later found involve in a baby formula smuggling scheme.

- Eric Chung 鍾志光 as Mr. Wai 威叔

The security guard in charge of the building where the village residence live in. He was also a housing village resident.

- Eddie Ho 何偉業 as Lik 力

A security guard at the housing village that was under Law Bak's supervision.

- Man Yeung Ching Wah 楊證樺 as Henry

In charge of the building maintenance department and Law Tai Shu's supervisor when his undercover job was a plumber.

- Joan Lee 利穎怡 as Mandy

A receptionist in the building maintenance department and Henry's assistant. She was attracted to Law Tai Shu at first sight because she thinks he is handsome.

- Leung Pok Yan 梁博恩 as Dong 東

Owner of the housing village mall Chinese and western pharmacy. He helped building security nab the local racketeer.

- Andy Lau Tin-lung 劉天龍 as Lung 龍

Owner of the housing village mall electronic and repair shop.

=== Hong Kong Police ===
- Junior Anderson 安德尊 as Wu Sir (Wu Ting Lung) 鄔正隆

Fa Ping's soft spoken and understanding supervisor. He became in charge of Fa Ping and Law Tai Shu's undercover case which he code names "Apple Tree". He liked to dress up in disguises and act out in different characters every time he met up with Fa Ping and Law Dai Shu to secretly discuss their undercover assignment.

- Stanley Cheung 張景淳 as Mak Ka Lun 麥家倫

Law Tai Shu's police partner. He had gastric issues that caused him to fart and digest when he became nervous, causing him to have the nickname "Jinxed Lun". He was later switched to Wu Sir's squad unit and sent to go undercover as a building security guard in order to provide back up for Fa Ping and Law Tai Shu, also to trail Tai Shu's father. As a security guard, he encountered and reconnected with his childhood friend So Fung Nei.

- Hugo Wong 黃子恆 as Ying Sir (Valen"Tino") 邢藍

A police officer that Fa Ping had a flirtatious relationship with. He was originally Fa Ping's undercover partner, but because he had injured his leg, Law Tai Shu took his place in the undercover operation. He was also a materialistic person like Fa Ping's former self. He became jealous after seeing how close Fa Ping and Dai Shu had become.

- So Lai Ming 蘇麗明 as Ko Man 高敏

A tomboyish and butch female cop in the same squad unit as Fa Ping.

- Gregory Lee 李泳豪 as Yue Chun 余春

A CID officer in Wu Sir's squad unit.

- Dickson Wong 黃得生 as Chu Sing 朱星

A CID officer in Wu Sir's squad unit. He and fellow officer Law Gei On liked to take bets on what Fa Ping will wear to work.

- Max Choi 蔡曜力 as Law Gei On 羅紀安

A CID officer in Wu Sir's squad unit. He and fellow officer Chu Sing liked to take bets on what Fa Ping will wear to work.

- Eddie Li 李岡龍 as Pang Sir 彭Sir

Law Dai Shu and Mak Ga Lun's original police supervisor.

- Dolby Kwan 關浩揚 as Luk Sir 陸Sir

A Police officer that Wu Sir hired to train Fa Ping and Dai Shu for their undercover assignment.

=== Extended cast ===
- Jacqueline Wong 黃心穎 as Lui Fong 呂芳

Law Tai Shu's girlfriend, later ex-girlfriend. Tai Shu's father Law Bak liked her a lot because she did household chores for him. She broke up with Dai Shu because she felt she was more a mother to him than a girlfriend.

- David Do 杜大偉 as Richard

Lui Fong's co-worker and later new boyfriend.

- Mat Yeung 楊明 as Brother Cheung Han 長恨哥

A triad boss who was also Wan Bun's loan shark boss.

- Wong Wai Tong 黃煒溏 as Cheung 昌

A racketeer trying to collect protection fees from So Fung Nei when she opened her facial spa.

- Derek Wong 黃建東 as Real-estate agent Chan 經紀陳

Law Bak's real estate agent who tried to sell him an apartment next to the apartment he really wants.

- Coffee Lam 林芊好 as Chin 千

Tong Hon Sze's co-worker at the stationery company. She was gossipy and scantily dressed.

- Yu Chi Ming 余子明 as Old man Tong 湯伯

Tong Hon Sze's father. He lived in a nursing home and used a wheelchair because of a heart attack.

- Akai Lee 李啟傑 as Deng Dai Si 鄧大時

Lau Lin Heung's ex-husband and Dung Dai Zit's father. He was remarried and has another family. He was a coward that lets his current wife bully his ex-wife unreasonably, which caused his son Tai Zit not wanting to have anything to do with him.

- Janice Shum 沈可欣 as Deng Dai Si's wife 鄧大時妻

Deng Dai Si's current wife who was pregnant with twins. She was a petty and bitter person who did not want her husband providing for and having any contact with his son Dung Dai Zit, by his ex-wife.

- Ngai Wai Man 魏惠文 as Antique store owner 古董店老闆

Owner of a retro antique store that Fa Ping's mother Wu Dip frequents.

- Chow Chung 周驄 as Ko Muk Wo Fai 高木和輝

Ga May Yung's Japanese doctor who talked her out of committing suicide when her face had become disfigured after a botched surgery.

== Development ==
TVB 2015 calendar, month of April image. From left to right: Edwin Siu, Priscilla Wong, Raymond Cho and Mandy Wong.

- A promo image of Madam Cutie On Duty was featured in TVB's 2015 calendar for the month of April.
- The costume fitting ceremony was held on November 14, 2013, 12:30 p.m. at Tseung Kwan O TVB City Studio One.
- The blessing ceremony was held on December 10, 2013, 3:00 p.m. at Tseung Kwan O TVB City.
- The shopping mall depicted in the drama is the "Sau Mau Ping Shopping Centre", located in Kowloon, Hong Kong.
- Shortly after filming of the drama wrapped up Edwin Siu and Priscilla Wong began dating in real life.

== Viewership ratings ==
Week	Episodes	Date	Average Points	Peaking Points
1	01－05	Jan 12–16, 2015	25	26
2	06－10	Jan 19–23, 2015	25	27
3	11－15	Jan 26–30, 2015	24	25
4	16－20	Feb 2–6, 2015	26	30
Total average			25	30

== Awards and nominations ==
Year	Ceremony	Category	Nominee	Result
2015	StarHub TVB Awards	My Favourite TVB Drama	Madam Cutie on Duty	Nominated
2015	StarHub TVB Awards	My Favourite TVB Actor	Edwin Siu	Nominated
2015	StarHub TVB Awards	My Favourite TVB Actress	Priscilla Wong	Nominated
2015	StarHub TVB Awards	My Favourite TVB Male TV Character	Edwin Siu	Won
2015	StarHub TVB Awards	My Favourite TVB Female TV Character	Priscilla Wong	Won
2015	StarHub TVB Awards	My Favourite Onscreen Couple	Edwin Siu & Priscilla Wong	Won
2015	TVB Star Awards Malaysia	My Favourite TVB Actor in a Leading Role	Edwin Siu	Nominated
2015	TVB Star Awards Malaysia	My Favourite TVB Actress in a Leading Role	Priscilla Wong	Nominated
2015	TVB Star Awards Malaysia	My Favourite TVB Actor in a Supporting Role	Raymond Cho	Nominated
2015	TVB Star Awards Malaysia	My Favourite TVB Actress in a Supporting Role	Mandy Wong	Nominated
2015	TVB Star Awards Malaysia	My Favourite TVB On-Screen Couple	Edwin Siu & Priscilla Wong	Won
2015	TVB Star Awards Malaysia	My Favourite Top 16 TVB Drama Characters	Priscilla Wong	Won
2015	TVB Anniversary Awards	TVB Anniversary Award for Best Drama	Madam Cutie on Duty	Nominated
2015	TVB Anniversary Awards	TVB Anniversary Award for Best Actor	Edwin Siu	Nominated
2015	TVB Anniversary Awards	TVB Anniversary Award for Best Actress	Priscilla Wong	Nominated
2015	TVB Anniversary Awards	TVB Anniversary Award for Best Supporting Actor	Raymond Cho	Nominated
2015	TVB Anniversary Awards	TVB Anniversary Award for Best Supporting Actor	Anderson Junior	Nominated
2015	TVB Anniversary Awards	TVB Anniversary Award for Best Supporting Actress	Rachel Kan	Nominated
2015	TVB Anniversary Awards	TVB Anniversary Award for Most Popular Male Character	Edwin Siu	Nominated
2015	TVB Anniversary Awards	TVB Anniversary Award for Most Popular Female Character	Priscilla Wong	Nominated
2015	TVB Anniversary Awards	TVB Anniversary Award for Most Popular Female Character	Mandy Wong	Nominated
2015	TVB Anniversary Awards	TVB Anniversary Award for Favourite Drama Song	I'll Always Be Yours by Edwin Siu	Nominated
