= Master of Play =

- Promotional poster
- 心戰
- Genre: Crime, Drama, Psychological thriller
- Written by: Chow Yuk Ming
- Starring: Adam Cheng; Moses Chan; Kenny Wong; Maggie Shiu; Aimee Chan
- Theme music composer: Tiger Hui
- Opening theme: Boundary (界限) by Adam Cheng
- Country of origin: Hong Kong
- Original language: Cantonese
- No. of episodes: 30

Production
- Producer: Jonathan Chik
- Production location: Hong Kong
- Camera setup: Multi camera
- Production company: Television Broadcasts Limited

Original release
- Network: TVB Jade
- Release: May 21 – June 29, 2012

Master of Play (心戰) is a 2012 Hong Kong psychological crime thriller produced by TVB. It stars veteran actor Adam Cheng and internationally acclaimed 2007 TVB Anniversary Awards Best Actor Moses Chan in the lead role, portraying characters playing a cat-and-mouse game of deceit, suspense and intrigue.

== Synopsis ==
Kan Siu-Nam (Adam Cheng), due to the loss of his daughter Tansy, divorces his wife, Angela (Rebecca Chan). He whole-heartedly focuses on his acting career since then, still clinging on to the belief that his daughter was still alive. Due to a role in which he plays a murderer, he becomes embroiled into a serial killer case. Through his acquaintance Esther (Maggie Shiu), he meets renowned magician Ivan (Moses Chan) and his sister Natalie (Aimee Chan). As a spate of serial killings hits Hong Kong, Kan suspects that Ivan is related to the incidents. Pitting his wits against Ivan's schemes, Kan seeks to reveal the truth behind the killings, and discover the truth behind his daughter's disappearance.

== Plot summary ==
Kan Siu-Nam (Adam Cheng) is a stage actor whose daughter, Tansy, was wrongly kidnapped more than 20 years ago. Refusing to accept it as a fact, he clings on to the belief that she is still alive. When called upon to play the role of a convicted murderer who insists he is wronged, Kan discovers that he can use his skills to replicate the subject's psyche in his own mind and take on other people's persona within himself.

Ivan Cheung Sai-yin (Moses Chan) is a stage magician who has a dark past of his own, being involved in the kidnapping of Siu-Nam's daughter Tansy. Ever since his father disappeared when he was a child, he has been living a new life with his sister Natalie (Aimee Chan). When an old acquaintance from his past reappears, threatening to unravel his present life, he has no choice but to kill him. However, killing him triggers Ivan's dissociative identity disorder, unlocking his other personalities: Eric, the personification of his evilness; Michelle, the personification of his lust and envy; Edwin, the personification of his pride and cunningness; and Martin, the personification of his wrath and temper. These 4 personalities influence him to kill more and more people, in order to keep his past a secret.

As fate would have it, Siu-Nam and Ivan eventually cross paths despite the latter's attempt to avoid him. When a streak of serial killings hit Hong Kong, the police seek Siu-Nam's assistance in the investigations. As Siu-Nam digs deeper, he realizes that Ivan is more complicated than he appears to be, and that Ivan was related to his daughter's kidnap. In order to find out the truth, Siu-Nam replicates Ivan's psyche in his own mind, unwittingly taking on Ivan's 4 other personas as well.

Getting too deep into Ivan's psyche, with the other personalities dominating him, Siu-Nam starts to lose his grip on reality, becoming every bit as dangerous as Ivan. Can he unravel the truth before he is consumed by madness? Who will win in this battle of wits and emerge as the Master of Play?

== Cast ==
=== Kan family ===
Actor	Character	Description
Adam Cheng	Kan Siu Nam (靳兆楠)	A stage actor Angela's ex-husband Father of Kan Chi-ying; Suffered from mental illness in Episode 29; Believes Cheung Sai-yin (章世言) is in his mind Body was taken over by Cheung Sai-yin's personas in Episode 30; Attempted a deadly escape act in Episode 30 under Sai-yin's influence. His fate was left uncertain when his true persona resurfaced, dispelling Sai-yin's persona from himself.
Rebecca Chan	Mok Lai-Hing (莫麗馨)	Angela; Kan Siu Nam's ex-wife, manager Mother of Kan Chi-ying see Chan family
Lily Ho	Kan Chi-ying (靳芷縈)	Tansy; Older version of Mok Lai-Hing and Kan Siu Nam's missing daughter who was kidnapped 25 years ago that now only exists in Kan Siu Nam's mind Mok Lai-Hing and Kan Siu Nam's missing daughter who was kidnapped mistakenly by Cheng Sai-yin (章世言) and his father Killed by Cheng Sai-yin's father shortly after being kidnapped

=== Chiang family ===
Actor	Character	Description
Moses Chan	Cheung Sai-yin (章世言)	Ivan; Birth name Cheung Siu-kwun (張小軍); Stage magician, serial killer Boyfriend of Lee Chor-kui; Cheung Sai-ting's older half brother (Later revealed to be blood-related in Episode 29); Adversary and friend of Kan Siu Nam; Eric, Michelle, Martin, Edwin and Henry are aspects of his dissociative identity disorder Killed by Kan Siu Nam in Episode 29; His personalities overtook Kan Siu Nam's body in Episode 30, causing Siu Nam to endanger his own life by attempting a deadly escape act (Although Siu Nam had Sai-yin's personalities, he lacked the skills required to perform the act).
Aimee Chan	Cheung Sai-ting (章世婷)	Natalie; Arborist; Cheung Sai-yin's younger half sister (Later revealed to be blood-related in Episode 29); Lied to Kan Siu Nam and Mok Lai Hing that she was their daughter, Tansy; Passed off as Kan Chi-ying (靳芷縈) in an attempt to prevent Kan Siu Nam from pursuing the matters of Tansy's disappearance and Steve's death.

=== Chan family ===
Actor	Role	Description
Yu Yang	Chan Yat-kei (陳一奇)	Steve; Dentist; Husband of Mok Lai-Hing; Father of Chan Cheuk-kwan; Good friend of Kan Siu Nam; Mistakenly killed by Cheung Sai-yin, who assumed he was Kan Siu Nam.
Rebecca Chan	Mok Lai-Hing	Angela; Wife of Chan Yat-kei; Manager and ex-wife of Kan Siu Nam; Mother of Chan Cheuk-kwan and Kan Chi-ying
Dickson Wong	Chan Cheuk-kwan	Will; Son of Chan Yat-kei and Mok Lai-Hing; Godson of Kan Siu Nam. Harboured romantic feelings for Natalie for a period of time.

=== Jekyll bar (Ivan's Personality) ===
Actor	Role	Description
Kenny Wong	Eric	Bar owner Michelle's boy friend Personification of Cheung Sai-yin's evil Died along with Cheng Sai-yin (章世言) in Episode 29
Rachel Kan	Michelle	Bar customer Eric's girl friend Personification of Cheung Sai-yin's lust and envy Died along with Cheng Sai-yin (章世言) in Episode 29
Steven Ho	Martin	Bar customer Personification of Cheung Sai-yin's wrath and violence Died along with Cheng Sai-yin (章世言) in Episode 29
Glen Lee Lam Yan	Edwin	Bar tender Personification of Cheung Sai-yin's pride and cunningness Died along with Cheng Sai-yin (章世言) in Episode 29
Dia Yiu Ming	Henry	Waiter; Personification of Cheung Sai-yin's conscience Killed by Eric in Episode 5, later returned again to plead with Sai-yin to take the right path

== Viewership ratings ==
The following is a table that includes a list of the total ratings points based on television viewership.

Week	Originally aired	Episodes	Average points	Peaking points	Reference
1	May 21, 2012	1	28	30	
1	22–25 May 2012	2 — 5	27	30	
2	28 May – 1 June 2012	6 — 10	24	26	
3	4–8 June 2012	11 — 15	23	26	
4	11–15 June 2012	16 — 20	24	—	
5	18–22 June 2012	21 — 25	23	—	
6	25–29 June 2012	26 — 30	25	30	
