= Evergreen Mak Cheung-ching =

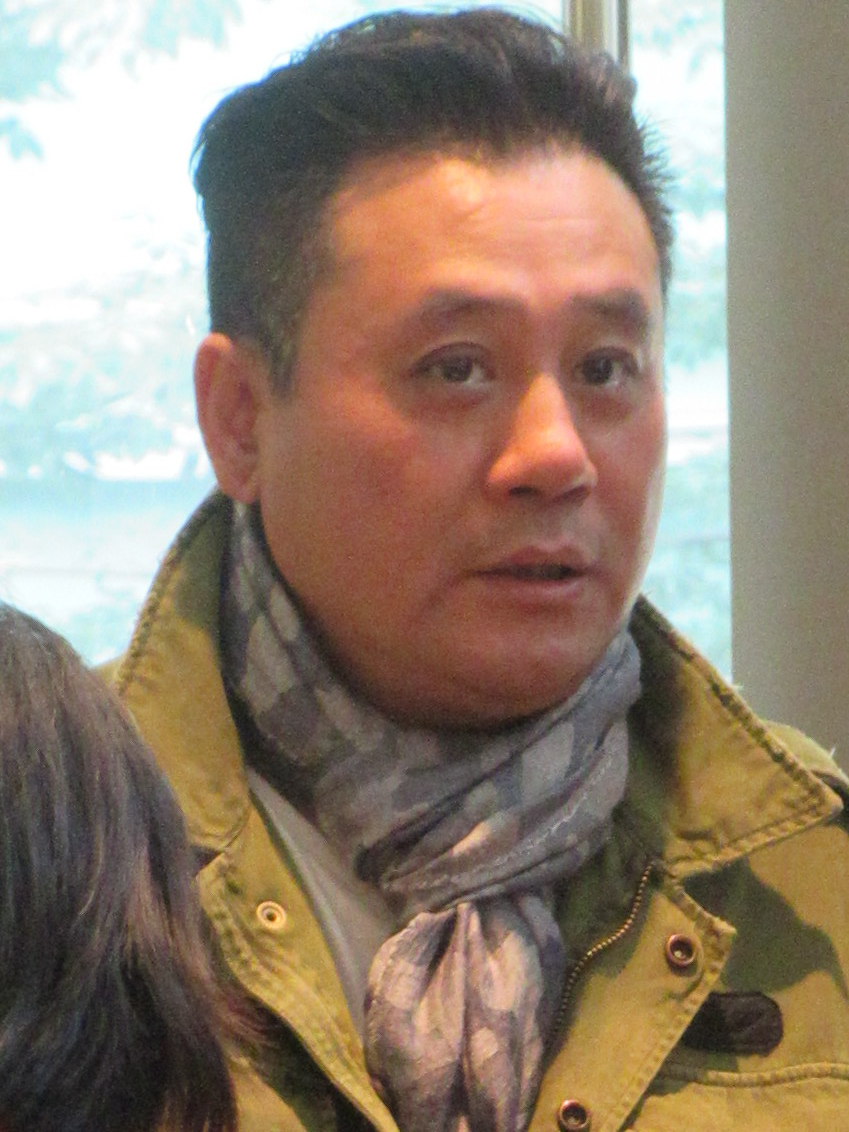
- Mak in 2017
- Born: 18 December 1968 (age 57); Shunde, Guangdong, China
- Occupations: Actor; TV host
- Years active: 1987–present
- Awards: TVB Anniversary Awards – Best Supporting Actor; 2010 No Regrets Asian Television Awards – Best Supporting Actor; 2011 No Regrets

Chinese name
- Traditional Chinese: 麥長青
Transcriptions
Standard Mandarin
- Hanyu Pinyin: Mài Chángqīng
Yue: Cantonese
- Jyutping: Mak6 Coeng4-cing1
- Musical career
- Also known as: Makbau (麥包); Evergreen
- Origin: Hong Kong

Evergreen Mak Cheung-ching (Chinese: 麥長青, born 18 December 1968), better known as Makbau (麥包), is a Hong Kong actor. He had been an actor with TVB for more than 30 years.

== Early life ==
Mak was born in Shunde District, Foshan, China, and his ancestral hometown is Qingyuan, Guangdong province.

== Career ==
Mak was praised for his portrayal of the main antagonist, Leung Fei-fan (Fei Fan Gor), in the 2010 TVB drama No Regrets, for which he won the TVB Anniversary Award for Best Supporting Actor. He also won the Best Actor in a Supporting Role award in the Asian Television Awards 2011 for the same role.

He is also known for his voiceover work for cartoons, as well a children show host for Flash Fax and After School ICU.

Mak made his mainland China debut in May 2021 after working with TVB for three decades. His final acting role with TVB was in 2015's Captain of Destiny and he left TVB in 2019 when his contract expired. He was one of a score of former TVB artists who moved following a lack of opportunities in Hong Kong with the 2019–2020 Hong Kong protests and the COVID-19 pandemic in Hong Kong.

== Filmography ==
=== Film ===
Title	Year	Role	Notes
The Last Conflict	1988		
The Iron Butterfly	1989		
Proud and Confident	1989	B.O.B. officer	
Ghost Busting	1989	trainee	
Best Friend of the Cops	1990	Shing	
The Gods Must Be Crazy V	1994	Mickey's friend	aka The Gods Must Be Funny in China
Bomb Lover	1995	Ngok Tat-shing	
Enemy Shadow	1995		
Evil Instinct	1996		
A Killer's Expiry Date	1998		
A Long and Forgotten Ghost Story	1998		
God.com	1998	Bill	
Story of Prostitutes	2000		
Love is Butterfly	2002	Prince Wah	
Heroic Duo	2003	Superintendent Lau	
New Police Story	2004	Negotiator	cameo
The Wild	2006	Nigel	Voice (Cantonese version)
Kung Fu Mahjong 3 - The Final Duel	2007	Waiter	cameo
Pleasant Goat and Big Big Wolf — The Super Snail Adventure	2009	Pon Chia-chia	Voice (Cantonese version)
Pleasant Goat and Big Big Wolf — Full of Vigor	2010	General Tiger	Voice (Cantonese version)
72 Tenants of Prosperity	2010	Shoe store owner	cameo
Marriage with a Liar	2010		
Pleasant Goat and Big Big Wolf — Music Castle: The Space Adventure	2011	Bitter Melon King	Voice (Cantonese version)
I Love Hong Kong	2011	Fei-fan Gor	cameo
Summer Love	2011		
Turning Point 2	2011		
I Love Hong Kong 2012	2012		
Pleasant Goat and Big Big Wolf — Mission Incredible: Adventures on the Dragon's Trail	2012	Black Dragon	Voice (Cantonese version)
I Love Hong Kong 2013	2013	Seven Star	
A Secret Between Us	2013		
Special ID	2013	Brother Kun	
Wild City	2015		
Kidnap Ding Ding Don	2016		
Special Female Force	2016		
Our Days in 6E	2017		
A Home with a View	2019		
Top Female Force	2019		
Raging Fire	2021		

=== Television dramas ===
Title	Year	Role	Notes/Ref.
The Seasons	1987		extra
Military Power	1988	Soldier	
Twilight of a Nation	1988	Bandit	
The Vixen's Tale	1989		extra
The Sword and the Sabre	1989		extra
Deadly Secret	1989	Inmate	
Looking Back in Anger	1989	College student	
The Final Combat	1989	Xuan Bing Gong's disciple	
Greed	1989		extra
A Change of Fate	1995	Ching Tin-yuen kin	
Hand of Hope	1995	Kwok Yiu-leung	
Fist of Power	1995	Leung Kwan / Iron Bridge Three	
Justice Pao	1995	Chik Nou Ye; Lau Ting-wan	
From Act to Act	1995	Lau Ting-hong	
Detective Investigation Files II	1995	Fong Shiu-wing	
Cold Blood Warm Heart	1996	Lee Wai-leung	
The Criminal Investigator II	1996	Wong Yau	
Journey to the West	1996	Sha Wujing	
File of Justice V	1997	Yeung Kar-man	
The Demi-Gods and Semi-Devils	1997	Yau Tan-chi	
A Recipe for the Heart	1997	robber	
Dark Tales II	1998	Chu Yee-tan; Wong Luk-long	Episodes 1–5, 16–20
Journey to the West II	1998	Sha Wujing	
Moments of Endearment	1998	Tsang Ying-wai	
Plain Love II	1999	Jung Hon-ngau	
Ups and Downs	2000	Hung Dai-fung	
Lost in Love	2000	Raymond	
A Matter of Customs	2000	Lee Chu-shek	
Crimson Sabre	2000	Yee Sam / Arthat Tit	
In the Realm of Success	2001	Fung Fuk-yam	
A Step into the Past	2001	Mak Wai-kin	Episode 1
Love is Beautiful	2002	Fung Lok-yan	previously warehoused; available on video April 2001
Where the Legend Begins	2002	Cho Cheung / Cho Chi-man	
Whatever It Takes	2003	Ko Lik-sze, the Duke of Chai	previously warehoused; available on video January 2002
Vigilante Force	2003	Luk Tsan-ying	
The 'W' Files	2003	Kwok Chak-ching	
Better Halves	2003	Choi Yiu	
Love Paradise in Regalia Bay	2003	Bosco	Episodes 5–6
Armed Reaction IV	2004	"Tai Nan Choi" Shing Chin-choi	previously warehoused; released on video August 2003
ICAC Investigators 2004	2004	Yue King-sun	Episode 4
To Love with No Regrets	2004	Mak Sau-sing	
The Zone	2005	Fai	Episode 3
Lethal Weapons of Love and Passion	2006	Chu Tai, the Prince of Yin	
Safe Guards	2006	Foh Yeung-hung	
Forensic Heroes	2006	Kenny Lam Siu-chung	
Maidens' Vow	2006	Lin Chung-hin	
Glittering Days	2006	Inspector Wah Lung	
At Point Blank	2006	Law Kai-fai	previously warehoused; available on video August 2001
Dicey Business	2006	Tyrant Cheung	Episode 1
Doomed to Oblivion	2007	Wong Tsan	previously warehoused; available on video April 2002
Life Art	2007	Daniel Ko Dai-wai	Nominated — TVB Anniversary Award for Best Supporting Actor (Top 20)
The Green Grass of Home	2007	Yip Sheung-shing	
Fathers and Sons	2007	Leo Lui Kar-chai	
The Gentle Crackdown II	2008	So Tsan-nam	
Catch Me Now	2008	Chiu Kwan-ho	
Last One Standing	2008	"Tai Kau" Poon Chi-kan	
When Easterly Showers Fall on the Sunny West	2008	Yip Heung-yeung	
The Stew of Life	2009	Johnson Yau Kai	Nominated — TVB Anniversary Award for Best Supporting Actor (Top 15)
ICAC Investigators 2009	2009	Mok Yau-kuen	Episode 5
The Beauty of the Game	2009–10	To Tang	
A Watchdog's Tale	2009–10	Ngan Tai-keung	
In the Eye of the Beholder	2010	Pao Sai-kit	
The Mysteries of Love	2010	Tsui Kwok-on	
When Lanes Merge	2010	Mark	Episode 20
No Regrets	2010	"Fei-fan Gor" Leung Fei-fan	Asian Television Award for Best Actor in a Supporting Role; TVB Anniversary Award for Best Supporting Actor
7 Days in Life	2011	Inspector Lau Cheuk-kei	
Only You	2011	Chong Sze-chai	
Grace Under Fire	2011	Ma Yu-chaan	
Face to Fate	2011	Hong Siu-ying	previously warehoused; DVD released August 2006
The Other Truth	2011	Siu Fuk	Episodes 17–20
Wax and Wane	2011	Young Man Wing-cheong	
The Life and Times of a Sentinel	2011	Po Chai	
River of Wine	2011	Prefect Chow Sai-fan	
Daddy Good Deeds	2012	Ko Wai-ting	
House of Harmony and Vengeance	2012	Kiu Bo-lung / Ko Yan	
Ghetto Justice II	2012	Kau Tai-wai	
The Day of Days	2013		
Reality Check	2013	Leung Zhong-Xun	
Karma Rider	2013	Wan Tin Bong	
Return of the Silver Tongue	2013-14	Ha Hau-mo	Nominated — TVB Anniversary Award for Best Supporting Actor (Top 15)
Queen Divas	2014	Lin Chi-sam	
Storm in a Cocoon	2014	Poon Ka-hin	
My "Spiritual" Ex-Lover	2015	Ning Choi-man	Nominated (with Nancy Sit & Edwin Siu) — TVB Anniversary Award for Best Theme Song
Romantic Repertoire	2015	Tin Hak-kan	
Brick Slaves	2015	Lo Bit-tat	
Every Step You Take	2015	Yue Kar-ging	Nominated — TVB Star Awards Malaysia for Best Supporting Actor
Momentary Lapse Of Reason	2015		
Captain of Destiny	2015	Cheung Po Tsai	Cameo
Come Home Love 2	2015-16	Lun Bak-fuen	Season 2 Main cast Nominated — 2015 TVB Anniversary Award for Best Actor (Top 20)
Shadow of Justice	2018	Pharmasict Cheung Bo-yang	
Guardian Angel	2018	Yan Chi-hang	
Showman's Show	2019	Madison	
White War	2019	Gu Wei cong	
Flying Tiger 2	2020	Wan Hoi	
See Her Again	2024	Shek Tat Chi	

=== Host ===
Year	Title	Notes
2014	Feastival a la Stars 明星愛廚房	
2016	Bazaar Carnivals 街市遊樂團	
2017	Bazaar Carnivals 2 街市遊樂團	
2017	Litigation @ Home 關你家事	
2017 - 2018	Bazaar Carnivals 3 街市遊樂團	Nominated (with Elena Kong & Joyce Tang) — TVB Anniversary Award for Best Host (Top 15) Awarded — TVB Anniversary Award for Best Non - Drama Program (1 of 5 shows awarded)
2018	Bazaar Carnivals 4 街市遊樂團	
2018	包友食神	Online series; hosted on Facebook
2019	C9 Tour; C9旅行團	ViuTV
2020	Midlife Crisis 中佬唔易做	ViuTV, EP1-4

=== Awards ===
- 2010: 43rd TVB Anniversary Awards Ceremony - Best Supporting Actor award (No Regrets)
- 2011: 16th Asian Television Awards - Best Supporting Actor award (No Regrets)

Awards and achievements
TVB Anniversary Awards
Preceded by Michael Tse for E.U.	Best Supporting Actor; 2010 for No Regrets	Succeeded by Ben Wong for Lives of Omission
