= Reality Check (2013 TV series) =

Hong Kong television drama series

- Promo poster
- 心路GPS
- Genre: Drama
- Written by: Lau Chi-wah
- Starring: Louise Lee; Ruco Chan; Mak Cheung-ching; Priscilla Wong; Rebecca Chan; Stanley Cheung
- Theme music composer: Yip Siu-chung
- Opening theme: "小草" (Little Grass) by Ruco Chan
- Country of origin: Hong Kong
- Original language: Cantonese
- No. of episodes: 20

Production
- Executive producer: Lee Yim-fong
- Camera setup: Multi camera
- Running time: 45 minutes (per episode)
- Production company: TVB

Original release
- Network: Jade, HD Jade
- Release: 18 February – 15 March 2013

Related
- The Day of Days; A Great Way to Care

Reality Check
- intertitle
- Chinese: 心路GPS
- Literal meaning: "Heart's Road GPS"
Transcriptions
Standard Mandarin
- Hanyu Pinyin: Xīnlù GPS
Yue: Cantonese
- Jyutping: Sam1lou6 GPS

Reality Check (Chinese: 心路GPS) is a Hong Kong television drama serial created by Lee Yim-fong and produced by TVB. It first premiered on Jade in Hong Kong on 18 February 2013, airing to 20 episodes with two episodes back-to-back.

The serial centers on the relationships between Summer (Ruco Chan) and his two mothers – his foster mother, Tsui (Louise Lee) and his estranged birth mother, Han (Rebecca Chan).

== Synopsis ==
In preparation for filming a brand-new reality show, senior TV producer Summer Ha (Ruco Chan) is ready to document a Hong Kong teenager Sky Cheung (Hero Yuen), who goes back to mainland China from the city in pursuit of the realm of returning to nature through his experience of the rural life there.

However, the TV station has a drastic shortage of manpower, so Summer recruits a rookie May Hui (Priscilla Wong) as his assistant, and his best friend Leung Chung-shun (Mak Cheung-ching) as the photographer. During the filming, each of them witnesses the significant change of the hero's personality when this typical Hong Kong Kid is confronted with the culture conflicts in the countryside. In addition, everyone's blind spot in daily life has also been addressed. Summer, who is always subjective and persistent, starts afresh to review the love-hate relationship between him and his foster mother Lau Tsui-wan (Louise Lee) as well as his biological mother Ha Siu-han (Rebecca Chan). Being diligent and sincere, May works so hard to recover her self-esteem and the long-lost paternal love. Male chauvinist Shun's quarrel with his family members over trifles stirs up a great disturbance, resulting in his family being torn to pieces. Will the GPS Guide for the Soul eventually help them out of their predicament?

== Cast ==
- Ruco Chan as Summer Ha Yat-cheung (夏日長) – a strict and demanding senior TV producer. Summer is extremely filial to Tsui, his foster mother, but loathes his own birth mother Han, who he believed had abandoned him.
- Louise Lee as Lau Tsui-wan (劉翠雲) – a mother of two. Tsui and her husband adopted Summer, who was abandoned by his biological mother when he was eight years old. Summer is extremely filial to Tsui, but the disrespecting conduct from Tsui's own two children leads her to slide into a depressive state, later developing a gambling addiction.
- Rebecca Chan as Ha Siu-han (夏笑嫻) – Summer's biological mother. After giving birth to Summer at the age of 16 years, Han dropped out of school to find work and a family for Summer, neglecting her son to the care of various relatives. Summer believed that Han disliked him and he ran away, later to be adopted by Tsui's family.
- Priscilla Wong as May Hui Mei-fung (許美鳳) – Summer's production assistant. Hailing from a wealthy family in Canada, May escapes to Hong Kong to avoid her misogynistic father and starts her dream career in the motion picture industry.
- Mak Cheung-ching as Leung Chung-shun (梁忠信) – an accomplished cameraman and Summer's best friend. Living with his elderly parents, his wife, and his 14-year-old daughter, the chauvinistic Shun tries to convince his wife to quit her job so she can stay at home to care for his parents; his suggestion then entices a long-lasting quarrel between his family members that almost tears his family apart.
- Stanley Cheung as Wong Wai-hong (王偉康) – Shun's apprentice and next-door neighbour. Obedient, hard-working, and creative, Hong dreams to be a director, but his overprotective master leads Hong to become too dependent.
- Hero Yuen as Sky Cheung Tsun-kit (張俊傑) – a 16-year-old high school student. Sky's rude and indulging personality leads Summer to cast him in a reality program that documents the life of a city youth forced to live in the countryside for a period of 10 days or more. Later on in the show, Summer discovers that Sky's spoiled attitude is stemmed from his father's laxity.
- Rachel Kan as Mandy Chan Man-wah (陳敏華) – Tsui's daughter who immediately abandons Tsui when she is in monetary debt. Along with her younger brother Chung, Mandy intends to obtain her mother's property.
- Owen Cheung as Chan Man-chung (陳敏聰) – Tsui's son and Mandy's younger brother. Chung is unforgiving of Tsui when he finds out that she is in monetary debt and refuses to help her.
- Vincent Lam as Simon Wong Sai-man (黃世民) – Mandy's husband, who is a stockbroker.
- Jenny Lau as Chloe Au Ho-yee (區可兒) – Chung's girlfriend.
- Leung Ka-ki as Peggy Fong Bui-kei (方貝琪) – May's roommate and the TV station's AA coordinator.
- Meini Cheung as Wu Lai-fan (胡麗芬) – Shun's wife.
- Chow Chung as Leung Tung (梁東) – Shun's father.
- Teresa Ha as Cheung Kiu (張嬌) – Shun's mother.
- Yoyo Law as Leung Ka-yan (梁嘉欣) – Shun and Fan's 14-year-old daughter.
- Yu Tze-ming as Ho Chi-cheung (何志祥) – Hong's grandfather.

== Viewership ratings ==
Week	Episodes	Date	Average Points	Peaking Points
1	01－05	18–22 February 2013	24	
2	06－10	25 February – 1 March 2013	24	26
3	11－15	4–8 March 2013	26	
4	16－20	11–15 March 2013	29	32
