= Priscilla Wong =

Hong Kong actress and television host (born 1981)

- 黃翠如
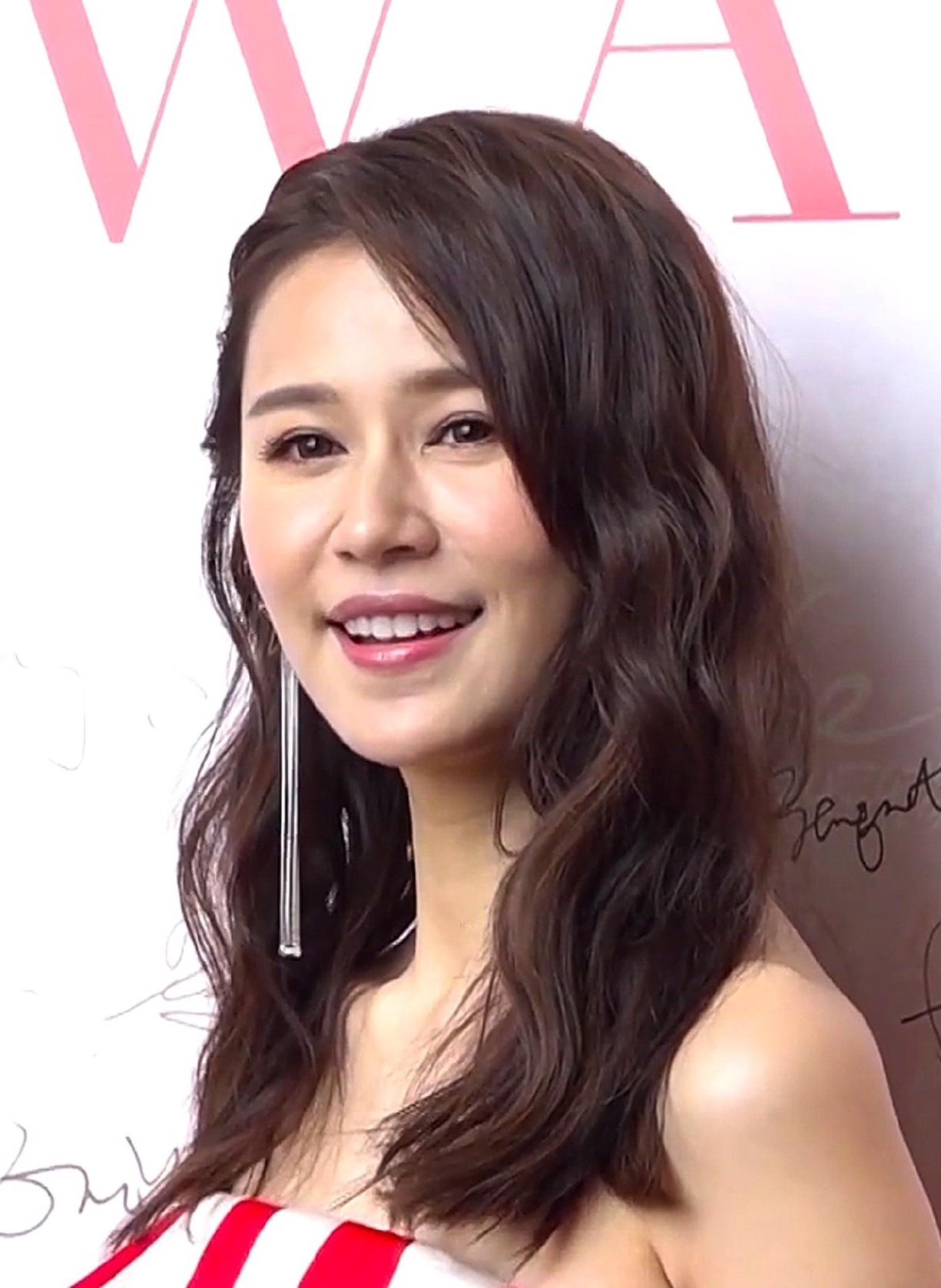
- Wong in October 2019
- Born: Wong Tsui-yu; 23 October 1981 (age 44); British Hong Kong
- Education: Hong Kong Baptist University
- Occupations: Actress; Television host
- Years active: 2003–present
- Notable work: Pilgrimage of Wealth; Madam Cutie On Duty; Two Steps From Heaven; Life After Death
- Spouse: Edwin Siu (m. 2018)
- Children: 1

Chinese name
- Traditional Chinese: 黃翠如
- Simplified Chinese: 黄翠如
Transcriptions
Standard Mandarin
- Hanyu Pinyin: Huáng Cuìrú
Yue: Cantonese
- Jyutping: Wong^{4} Ceoi^{3}-jyu^{4}

Priscilla Wong Tsui-yu (Note: Chinese: 黃翠如; Jyutping: Wong^{4} Ceoi^{3}-jyu^{4}) (born 23 October 1981) is a Hong Kong actress and television host. Wong began her career as an anchor at i-Cable in 2003, later joining TVB in 2012 for her acting career. She made her TV acting debut in Reality Check (2013) and received the "Most Improved Female Artiste" award at the 47th TVB Anniversary Awards in 2014.

== Life and career ==
=== 1981–2003: Early life ===
Priscilla Wong was born on 23 October 1981 in Hong Kong, the second oldest of five daughters. Her father worked as a fishmonger, originating from Chaozhou, while her mother is a homemaker. Growing up, her family struggled financially and lived in a public housing unit in Ma On Shan. In 1998, her father co-founded Luen Wong, a construction company that later became publicly listed in 2016. She attended Pentecostal Lam Hon Kwong Secondary School and graduated in 2000. During her time at school, Wong developed an interest in acting, particularly in stage theater. She actively participated in the school's drama club, assuming leadership responsibilities and taking part in various performances. It was during this time that she also received a scholarship to study acting in England. Wong initially dreamt of entering the Hong Kong Academy for Performing Arts but ultimately pursued a degree in communications and public relations at Hong Kong Baptist University, graduating in 2003.

=== 2003–2020: Career beginnings and early works ===
In 2003, Wong began working as an anchor for travelogue and entertainment news programs at the cable network i-Cable. She had a brief stint at Now TV in 2010 but returned to i-Cable a year later. At the time, she was known for having easy access to holding interviews with the comedian Stephen Chow. While Wong had a few opportunities in acting early on, including her role opposite Dicky Cheung in the film The Champions (2008), she did not fully transition into a professional acting career until she signed with the television network TVB in 2012.

Wong ventured into TV acting with her debut in the television drama Reality Check (2013), where she portrayed the role of a television production assistant. During the same year, she also appeared as a pickpocket in the costume drama Karma Rider and co-hosted the travelogue Pilgrimage of Wealth 2 alongside Tony Hung. Her hosting skills earned the "Best Host" at the 46th TVB Anniversary Awards. In 2014, Wong was recognized for her progress as an actress and received the "Most Improved Female Artiste" at the 47th TVB Anniversary Awards, for her performances in the television dramas Return of the Silver Tongue and Swipe Tap Love. The following year, Wong's on-screen chemistry with Edwin Siu in television drama Madam Cutie On Duty scored them two "Favorite Onscreen Couple" Awards at the StarHub TVB Awards and TVB Star Awards Malaysia, respectively.

In the following years, Wong's notable works included her role in Two Steps From Heaven (2016), where she portrayed a two-faced and manipulative character. This marked her first antagonistic role, a departure from her previous more straightforward characters. Her performance in the series earned her a Top 5 nomination for "Best Actress" at the 49th TVB Anniversary Awards. In 2017, Wong received recognition as one of the "Best Hosts" at the 50th TVB Anniversary Awards for her participation in the travelogue program Dodo Goes Shopping Season 2. She co-hosted the show alongside Carol Cheng and the hip-hop group FAMA. During the same year, Wong also took on the role of an undercover police officer in the crime drama Line Walker: The Prelude. She later reprised the same character in the sequel Line Walker: Bull Fight (2020).

=== 2020–present: Life After Death ===
Wong starred in the melodrama Life After Death (2020), where she portrayed a young widow navigating life challenges following her husband's demise. The show was relatively popular, and secured the fifth position on Yahoo! Hong Kong's "Most Search Television Dramas" of the year. She was generally praised for her performance.

== Personal life ==
In 2014, Wong met fellow actor Edwin Siu on the set of television drama Madam Cutie On Duty. They started dating some time later and were married in 2018. Additionally, she developed a close friendship with Shiga Lin and Yoyo Chen after working together on the TV series Life After Death (2020).

Wong suffered a miscarriage but later gave birth to a child in March 2025.

== Filmography ==
=== As actress ===
==== Television series ====
Year	Title	Role	Notes	Ref.
2013	Reality Check	May Hui Mei-fung		
2013	Karma Rider	Foon Hei		
2013-2014	Return of the Silver Tongue	Chow Kuk		
2014	Swipe Tap Love	Yu Chor-kin		
2015	Madam Cutie On Duty	Apple Fa Ping		
2015	Every Step You Take	Priscilla Wong Tsui-yu	Special appearance	
2015	Romance of 7 Days	Cheung Lin Lou	A CMB channel (South Korea)-TVB's J2 co-production	
2015-2016	Come Home Love 2	Wan Sze-sze	Season 2	
2016	A Time of Love II	Chin Ching	Episode 2 - Taiwan	
2016	Inspector Gourmet	Sam Oi-kiu		
2016	Two Steps From Heaven	Max Koo Shing-sheung		
2017	Married but Available	Janet Chu Ming-ming		
2017	Line Walker: The Prelude	Cheng Shuk-mui		
2017	My Ages Apart	Lam Ching-man	Guest star	
2017	Heart and Greed	Fong Hei-man		
2019	The Defected	Janice	Voice guest star	
2020	Life After Death	Laura Fong Lok-man		
2020	Ratman to the Rescue	Song Hoi-yan		
2020	Line Walker: Bull Fight	Cheng Shuk-mui		
2021	Battle Of The Seven Sisters	Alison Koo Ling-shan	Main Role	
2024	Darkside of the Moon	Yu Hey-sun	Supporting role	

==== Film ====
Year	Title	Role	Notes	Ref.
2002	Mighty Baby	Lily	Extra	
2004	I Will Be a Model	Receptionist		
2008	The Champions	An Ling		
2014	Mom, I Love You	Chan Suet		

=== As host ===
Year	English title	Chinese title	Network	Notes	Ref.
2003-2009, 2011	Entertainment News	有線娛樂新聞台	i-Cable		
2007	Wonderful Life	活得很滋味	i-Cable		
2008	40 Day Wild Vacation	40日峰狂嘆世界	i-Cable		
2009	Love Match Turnaround	玩轉姻玄路	i-Cable		
2010	Lifetival		NowTV		
2010	Tiger Has Party	老虎都要 party	NowTV		
2010	One Life One Earth	一個地球	NowTV		
2011	World Exploration With Every Single Person	地平線上 這個世界那些人	i-Cable		
2011	The Stories Of Those	那些人的故事	i-Cable		
2013	Pilgrimage of Wealth	走過浮華大地	TVB	with Tony Hung	
2013	Fun Hotels	蒲.酒店	TVB	with Jason Chan	
2013	Pilgrimage of Wealth	走過浮華大地 亞洲篇	TVB	with Tony Hung; season 2	
2014	The Conquerors	快樂聯盟	TVB		
2014	Pilgrimage to Football Meccas	走過足球聖地	TVB	with Tony Hung	
2014	Chef Minor	我係小廚神	TVB	with Bob Lam	
2015	Chef Minor 2	我係小廚神2	TVB	with Bob Lam	
2015	Make Your Choice	超強選擇一分鐘	TVB	with Sammy Leung and Chin Ka-lok	
2015	DoDo Goes Shopping	Do姐去Shopping	TVB	with Carol Cheng and FAMA	
2019	Here We Go Again	出走澳洲	TVB	with Tony Hung	
2022	Across Borders	遊走世界天與地	TVB		
2023	Taste Of East Meets West	煮東煮西	TVB		
2023	HERE WE GO, Off The Beaten Roads	膽粗粗·HERE WE GO	TVB		

== Awards and nominations ==
Year	Award	Category	Nominated work	Result
2013	TVB Anniversary Awards	My Favourite Female Character	Reality Check	Nominated
2013	TVB Anniversary Awards	Most Improved Female Artiste	Reality Check; Karma Rider; Pilgrimage of Wealth; Explore Hotels; Pilgrimage of Wealth II	Nominated
2013	TVB Anniversary Awards	Best Show Host (with Tony Hung)	Pilgrimage of Wealth II	Won
2013	TVB Star Awards Malaysia	Favourite TVB Promising Female Artiste	Reality Check; Karma Rider	Nominated
2013	TVB Star Awards Malaysia	Favourite TVB Show Host	Pilgrimage of Wealth	Won
2013	Yahoo！Asia Buzz Awards	Most Searched TV Actress	—N/a	Won
2014	TVB Most Popular TV Commercial Awards	Most Popular Actress	Extra chewing gum	Won
2014	StarHub TVB Awards	My Favourite TVB Actress	Swipe Tap Love	Nominated
2014	StarHub TVB Awards	My Favourite TVB Female TV Character	Swipe Tap Love	Nominated
2014	StarHub TVB Awards	My Favourite TVB Onscreen Couple (with Raymond Wong)	Swipe Tap Love	Nominated
2014	TVB Star Awards Malaysia	Favourite TVB Actress	Swipe Tap Love	Nominated
2014	TVB Star Awards Malaysia	Favourite TVB Drama Characters	Swipe Tap Love	Nominated
2014	TVB Star Awards Malaysia	Favourite TVB Onscreen Couple (with Raymond Wong)	Swipe Tap Love	Nominated
2014	TVB Star Awards Malaysia	Favourite Show TVB Host (with Tony Hung)	Pilgrimage to Football Meccas	Nominated
2014	TVB Anniversary Awards	Best Actress	Swipe Tap Love	Nominated
2014	TVB Anniversary Awards	My Favourite Female Character	Swipe Tap Love	Nominated
2014	TVB Anniversary Awards	Most Improved Female Artiste	Return of the Silver Tongue; Swipe Tap Love; The Conquerors; Pilgrimage to Football Meccas; Chef Minor	Won
2014	TVB Anniversary Awards	Best Show Host (with Tony Hung)	Pilgrimage to Football Meccas	Nominated
2015	StarHub TVB Awards	My Favourite TVB Actress	Madam Cutie On Duty	Nominated
2015	StarHub TVB Awards	My Favourite TVB Female TV Character	Madam Cutie On Duty	Won
2015	StarHub TVB Awards	My Favourite Onscreen Couple (with Edwin Siu)	Madam Cutie On Duty	Won
2015	TVB Star Awards Malaysia	Favourite TVB Actress	Madam Cutie On Duty	Nominated
2015	TVB Star Awards Malaysia	Top 16 Favourite TVB Drama Characters	Madam Cutie On Duty	Won
2015	TVB Star Awards Malaysia	Favourite TVB Onscreen Couple (with Edwin Siu)	Madam Cutie On Duty	Won
2015	TVB Anniversary Awards	Best Actress	Madam Cutie On Duty	Nominated
2015	TVB Anniversary Awards	My Favourite Female Character	Madam Cutie On Duty	Top 5
2015	TVB Anniversary Awards	Best Show Host (with Carol Cheng)	DoDo Goes Shopping	Nominated
2016	StarHub TVB Awards	My Favourite TVB Actress	Inspector Gourmet	Nominated
2016	StarHub TVB Awards	My Favourite TVB Host in Variety Program (with Bob Lam)	Chef Minor	Nominated
2016	TVB Star Awards Malaysia	Favourite TVB Actress	Two Steps From Heaven	Nominated
2016	TVB Star Awards Malaysia	Top 15 Favourite TVB Drama Characters	Two Steps From Heaven	Won
2016	TVB Star Awards Malaysia	Favourite TVB Onscreen Couple (with Bosco Wong and Edwin Siu)	Two Steps From Heaven	Nominated
2016	TVB Anniversary Awards	Best Actress	Two Steps From Heaven	Top 5
2016	TVB Anniversary Awards	My Favourite Female Character	Two Steps From Heaven	Nominated
2017	StarHub TVB Awards	My Favourite TVB Actress	Line Walker: The Prelude	Nominated
2017	StarHub TVB Awards	My Favourite TVB Drama Characters	Two Steps From Heaven	Nominated
2017	StarHub TVB Awards	My Favourite TVB Onscreen Couple (with Edwin Siu)	Two Steps From Heaven	Nominated
2017	StarHub TVB Awards	My Favourite TVB Onscreen Couple (with Tony Hung)	Married But Available	Nominated
2017	TVB Star Awards Malaysia	Favourite TVB Actress	Line Walker: The Prelude	Nominated
2017	TVB Star Awards Malaysia	Top 17 Favourite TVB Drama Characters	Line Walker: The Prelude	Won
2017	TVB Star Awards Malaysia	Favourite TVB Onscreen Couple (with Benjamin Yuen and Pakho Chau)	Line Walker: The Prelude	Nominated
2017	TVB Star Awards Malaysia	Favourite TVB Show Host	All Things Girl (with Elena Kong, Joyce Tang, etc.)	Nominated
2017	TVB Anniversary Awards	Best Actress	Line Walker: The Prelude	Nominated
2017	TVB Anniversary Awards	My Favourite Female Character	Line Walker: The Prelude	Nominated
2017	TVB Anniversary Awards	Most Popular On-screen Partnership (with Benjamin Yuen and Pakho Chau)	Line Walker: The Prelude	Nominated
2017	TVB Anniversary Awards	Best Show Host (with Carol Cheng)	DoDo Goes Shopping sr2	Nominated
2020	TVB Anniversary Awards	Best Actress	Life After Death	Nominated
2020	TVB Anniversary Awards	My Favourite Female Character	Life After Death	Nominated
2020	TVB Anniversary Awards	Most Popular Onscreen Partnership (with Shiga Lin and Yoyo Chen)	Life After Death	Nominated
2020	TVB Anniversary Awards	Favourite TVB Actress in Malaysia	Life After Death	Top 5
2021	TVB Anniversary Awards	Best Actress	Battle Of The Seven Sisters	Nominated
2021	TVB Anniversary Awards	My Favourite Female Character	Battle Of The Seven Sisters	Top 10
2021	TVB Anniversary Awards	Most Popular Onscreen Partnership (with Rosina Lam, Samantha Ko, Jeannie Chan and Judy Kwong)	Battle Of The Seven Sisters	Nominated
2021	TVB Anniversary Awards	Favourite TVB Actress in Malaysia	Battle Of The Seven Sisters	Top 5
2021	People's Choice Television Awards	People's Choice Best Actress	Battle Of The Seven Sisters	Nominated
2022	TVB Anniversary Awards	Best Female Host	Across Borders	Top 5
2023	TVB Anniversary Awards	Best Female Host	Taste Of East Meets West, ：HERE WE GO, Off The Beaten Roads	Top 5
