= Tony Hung =

Hong Kong actor

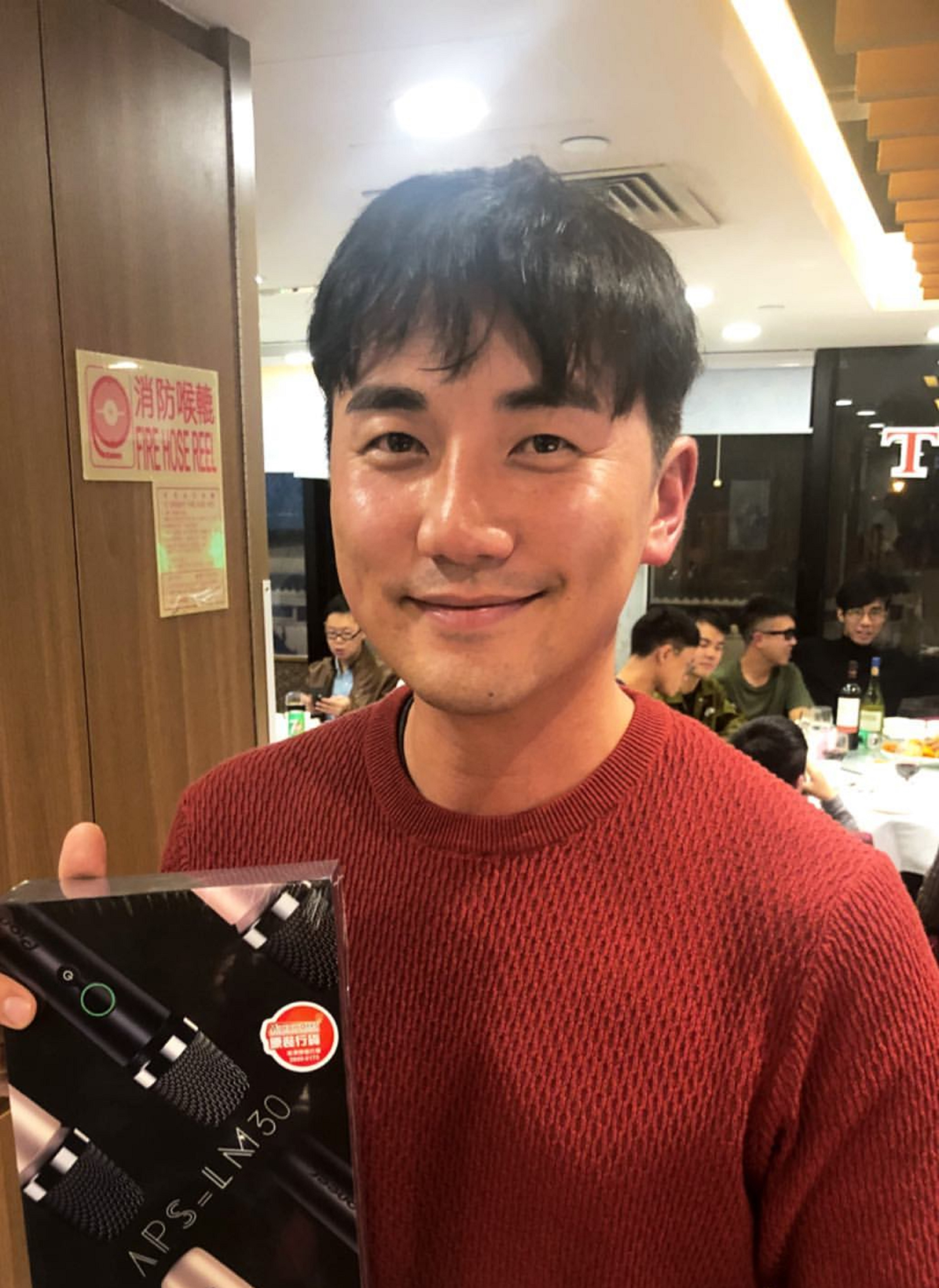
- Hung in Holly Restaurant, Jordan Road
- Occupations: Television host; actor
- Years active: 2010–present
- Notable work: Captain of Destiny; The Learning Curve of a Warlord
- Spouse: Inez Leong (m. 2021)
- Awards: TVB Anniversary Awards – Best Host; 2013 Pilgrimage of Wealth 2 Most Improved Male Artiste; 2015 Raising the Bar, Eye in the Sky, Every Step You Take, Captain of Destiny, World's Great Parties, Not Far But Away

Chinese name
- Traditional Chinese: 洪永城
Transcriptions
Standard Mandarin
- Hanyu Pinyin: Hong Wing Shing
Yue: Cantonese
- Jyutping: hung4 wing5 sing4

Signature
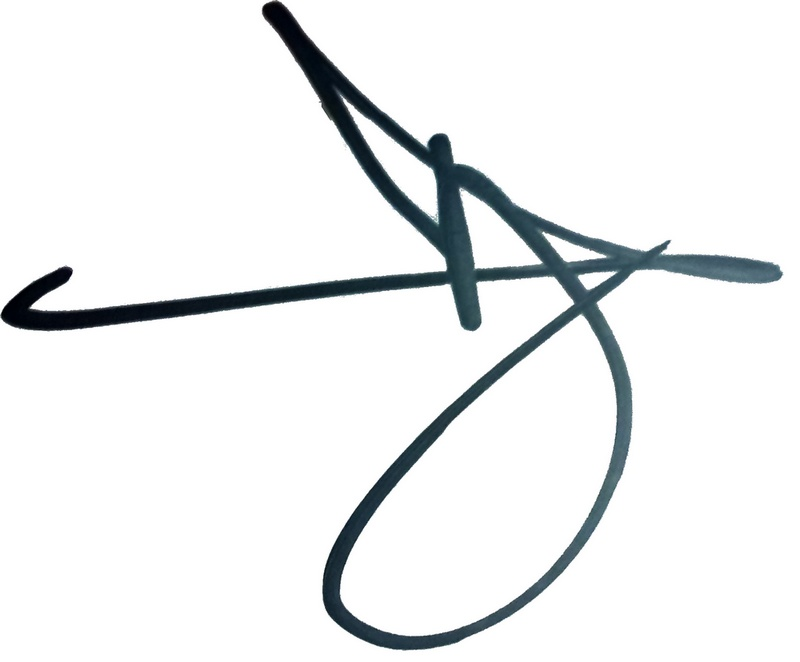

Anthony Hung Wing-sing, is a Hong Kong actor and television host currently contracted to TVB. He was formerly a host for Now TV.

== Biography ==
Tony Hung's mother was a Taiwanese businesswoman. The family lived in the Mid-Levels area of Hong Kong Island in their early years.

He hosts both reality and travel shows. At the 2013 TVB Anniversary Awards, he was awarded the best host together with partner Priscilla Wong for their show Pilgrimage of Wealth 2.

== Filmography ==
=== TV dramas ===
Year	Title	Role	Notes
2014	Outbound Love	Chin Chun	Major Supporting Role
2014	Swipe Tap Love	Cheung Yat-hei	Major Supporting Role
2014	Rear Mirror	Ivan Yiu Chi-hau	Main Role
2015	Raising The Bar	Terry Cheng Chi-hau	Cameo (Ep. 25)
2015	Eye in the Sky	Terry Tai Fu-lung	Major Supporting Role
2015	Every Step You Take	Hung Man-ho	Guest Appearance
2015	Captain of Destiny	Cheung Po Tsai	Main Role
2015	Angel In-the-Making	"Death" Ray Yeung Chi-ming	Main Role
2017	Recipes to Live By	Ting Yat-shan / Tong Wan-cho	Main Role
2017	Married but Available	Tony Au-yeung Tsz-chung	Main Role
2017	Line Walker: The Prelude	Wong Wing-cheung	Guest Appearance (Ep. 1)
2017	The Exorcist's Meter	Ghost	Guest Appearance (Ep. 8)
2018	Watch Out, Boss	Ryan Hong Shing-yu	Main Role
2018	The Learning Curve of a Warlord	Ma Tan	Main Role
2019	The Defected	SIP Yau Lai-chun	Guest Appearance
2019	ICAC Investigators 2019	Dave	Supporting Role
2019	Wonder Women	Yeung Wan-lap	Major Supporting Role
2019	Handmaidens United	Kau Kei-chun	Main Role
2020	Of Greed and Ants	Hugo Chong Tai-hei	Major Supporting Role
2020	Line Waker: Bull Fight	Wong Wing-cheung	Guest Appearance
2021	Armed Reaction 2021	Cheung Yiu-chung	Major Supporting Role
2022	Ghost Cleansing Ltd	Chiu Yat-sun	Main Role
2022	Forensic Heroes V	Dr. Chun Hak-nam	Main Role
2023	From Hong Kong to Beijing	Tsui Kong-man	Main Role
2024	The Airport Diary	Chan Kit	Main Role

=== Films ===
- Death Notify (2019)
- No Love Left in Tainan (2018)
- Blue Magic (2013)
- All's Well, Ends Well (2012)
- Big Blue Lake (2011)
