= Swipe Tap Love =

Hong Kong television series

- Official poster
- 愛我請留言
- Genre: Modern romance
- Created by: Hong Kong Television Broadcasts Limited
- Written by: Choi Yi 蔡怡; Chan Hai Keung 陳海強; Ng Wan Ying 伍婉瑩; Shum Lap Keung 沈立強; Yeung Suet Yee 楊雪兒
- Directed by: Cheng Yong Kei 鄭永基; Ong Mun Rong 翁文榮; Andy Chan 陳耀全; Ng Chau Rong 吳超榮; Cheong Yong Fei 張永輝
- Starring: Raymond Wong Ho-yin; Priscilla Wong; Eddie Kwan; Tony Hung; Kelly Fu; Elaine Yiu; Vincent Wong
- Opening theme: "留言"(Leave a Message) by Jinny Ng
- Country of origin: Hong Kong
- Original language: Cantonese
- No. of episodes: 20

Production
- Producer: Andy Chan 陳耀全
- Editor: Suet Hoi Ting 石凱婷
- Camera setup: Multi camera
- Running time: 45 minutes
- Production company: TVB

Original release
- Network: Jade; HD Jade
- Release: 31 March – 25 April 2014

Related
- Storm in a Cocoon; Journey to the West

Swipe Tap Love
- Traditional Chinese: 愛我請留言
- Literal meaning: "[If You] Love Me, Please Leave A Message"
Transcriptions
Standard Mandarin
- Hanyu Pinyin: ai wo qing liu yan
Yue: Cantonese
- Yale Romanization: dngoi3 ngo5 conga laud jin4
- Jyutping: ngoi3 ngo5 conga laud jin4

Swipe Tap Love (Chinese: 愛我請留言; literally "Love Me, Please Leave A Message", is a Hong Kong modern romance serial produced by TVB.

== Synopsis ==
2009, an ordinary year for most but it was a turning point for two disheartened souls.
A news report on a fire causes TV reporter, Yu Chor Gin (Priscilla Wong) to remember about her father's death from a car accident years ago. Chor Gin regrets not being able to see her father for the last time, and on the same day she meets Lok Tin Sung (Raymond Wong Ho-yin), a glass artist who has lost his sister in the fire. They accompany each other through the night silently. Afraid to miss another opportunity again, Chor Gin borrows Tin Sung's handphone to record an "I miss you" message to her pursuer, Cheng Yat Hei (Tony Hung).
Years later, Chor Gin is now a marketing manager at a chocolate factory. Chor Gin and Yat Hei have ended their 4 years relationship as they have grown more and more distant, leaving only doubts in their relationship. Chor Gin and Tin Sung meets again as her mother babysits Tin Sung's daughter. They began communicating via text messages. Their messages content include work, family and love encouragements to each other. It seems that an app for love has already been installed in their heart...

== Cast and characters ==
- Raymond Wong Ho-yin as Lok Tin Sung
- Priscilla Wong as Yu Chor Gin
- Eddie Kwan as Golden Wong Kum Gwai
- Tony Hung as Cheng Yat Hei
- Elaine Yiu as Emma Choi Yin
- Vincent Wong as Edward Wong Chi Cheung
- Kaki Leung as Natasha Sung Lau Guen
- Hebe Chan as Yeung Ka Ka
- Jonathan Cheung as Roger Ho Chi On
- Owen Cheung as George Ho Chi Fung
- Kelly Fu as Diana Jiao Fei

== Viewership ratings ==
| Week | Episodes | Date | Average Points | Peaking Points |
| 1 | 01–05 | March 31 – April 4, 2014 | 24 | 28 |
| 2 | 06–10 | April 7–11, 2014 | 23 | 26 |
| 3 | 11–15 | April 14–18, 2014 | 24 | 26 |
| 4 | 16–20 | April 21–25, 2014 | 26 | 28 |
