= List of TVB dramas in 2017 =

This is a list of television serial dramas released by TVB in 2017, including highest-rated television dramas and award ceremonies.

== Top ten drama series in ratings ==
The following is a list of TVB's top serial dramas in 2017 by viewership ratings. The recorded ratings include premiere week, final week, finale episode, and the average overall count of live Hong Kong viewers (in millions).

Highest-rated drama series of 2017
Rank	English title	Chinese title	Average	Peak	Premiere week	Final week	Series finale	HK viewers (millions)
1	The Unholy Alliance	同盟	28	30	26	29	30	1.96
2	A General, a Scholar and a Eunuch	超時空男臣PG13 成人題材	27	30	25	30	30	1.94
3	Tiger Mom Blues	親親我好媽PG13 成人題材	25	30	24	27	29	1.87
4	The Exorcist's Meter	降魔的PG13 成人題材	25	28	24	25	25	1.83
5	My Unfair Lady	不懂撒嬌的女人PG13 成人題材	24	29	24	29	30	1.85
6	My Ages Apart	誇世代PG13 成人題材	24	30	24	28	28	
7	Line Walker: The Prelude	使徒行者2PG13 成人題材	24	28	25	24	24	1.80
8	The No No Girl	全職沒女PG13 成人題材	23	28	21	26	27	1.78
9	Oh My Grad	老表，畢業喇!PG13 成人題材	23	27	24	23	24	1.71
10	The Tofu War	燦爛的外母PG13 成人題材	23	27	23	23	23	1.68

== Awards ==
Category/Organization	StarHub TVB Awards 21 October 2017	TVB Star Awards Malaysia 25 November 2017	TVB Anniversary Awards 21 January 2018
Best Drama	The Unholy Alliance	Legal Mavericks	My Ages Apart
Best Actor	Vincent Wong; Legal Mavericks	Michael Miu; Line Walker: The Prelude	Vincent Wong; Legal Mavericks
Best Actress	Ali Lee; Legal Mavericks	Jessica Hsuan; My Unfair Lady	Natalie Tong; My Unfair Lady
Best Supporting Actor	Owen Cheung; Legal Mavericks	Joel Chan; The Unholy Alliance	
Best Supporting Actress	Jacqueline Wong; Provocateur	Elaine Yiu; The Unholy Alliance	Rebecca Zhu; A General, a Scholar and a Eunuch
Most Improved Actor	Matthew Ho; Tiger Mom Blues and A General, a Scholar, and a Eunuch		Mat Yeung; My Dearly Sinful Mind and Bet Hur
Most Improved Actress	Samantha Ko; My Unfair Lady and Bet Hur	Zoie Tam; My Unfair Lady and Legal Mavericks	Mayanne Mak (as Most Improved Female Artiste); Miss Hong Kong 2017, Sammy On The Go, Line Walker: The Hunting Game and TVB 50th Anniversary Gala
Best Theme Song	"Forgot Myself" by Hana Kuk; Line Walker: The Prelude	"Sand in Hands" by Hana Kuk; My Unfair Lady	“I Was Here” by Hubert Wu; The Exorcist’s Meter
Most Popular On-Screen Couple or Partnership	Natalie Tong and Vincent Wong; My Unfair Lady	Nancy Wu and Ruco Chan; The Unholy Alliance	Edwin Siu, Raymond Cho and Matthew Ho; A General, a Scholar and a Eunuch

== First line-up ==
These dramas air in Hong Kong from 8:00pm to 8:30pm, Monday to Friday on Jade.

Broadcast	English title (Chinese title)	Eps.	Cast and crew	Theme song(s)	Avg. rating	Genre	Ref.
(from 2016); 4 Apr– 6 Jan	Come Home Love: Dinner at 8 愛·回家之八時入席	200	Sandy Shaw, Law Chun-ngok (producers); Shaw, Choi Suk-yin, Sin Chui-ching, Ma Chun-ying (writers); Teresa Mo, Wayne Lai, Chung King-fai, Power Chan, Florence Kwok, Angela Tong, William Hu, Mark Ma, Veronica Shiu, Jessica Kan, Eric Li, Anthony Wong	"完美的生活" (Perfect Life) by Jinny Ng	23	Sitcom	
9 Jan– 17 Feb	May Fortune Smile On You 財神駕到	30	Lee Tim-sing (producer); Chung Yeuk-si (writer); Wayne Lai, Pal Sinn, Claire Yiu, Amy Fan, Matthew Ho, Kelly Fu	"財神駕到" (Here Comes the Fortune) by Wayne Lai, Amy Fan, Pal Sinn, Matthew Ho & Kelly Fu	22	Period drama, Comedy	
20 Feb– 7 Aug 2026 (to 2018)	Come Home Love: Lo and Behold 愛·回家之開心速遞	2868	Sandy Shaw, Law Chun-ngok (producers); Ma Chun-ying, Lee Yi-wah, Yuen Bo-wai (writers); Lau Dan, Pal Sinn, Angela Tong, Koni Lui, Andrew Chan, Andrea So, Veronica Shiu, Joyce Tang, Kalok Chow, Law Lok-lam, Geoffrey Wong, Mark Ma, Ricco Ng, Hoffman Cheng, Mandy Lam, Kim Li	"Latin Soul Strut" "在心中" (Within the Heart) by Jacqueline Wong	TBA	Sitcom, Supernatural	

== Second line-up ==
These dramas air in Hong Kong from 8:30pm to 9:30pm, Monday to Friday on Jade.

Background shading indicates dramas not produced by TVB.

Broadcast	English title (Chinese title)	Eps.	Cast and crew	Theme song(s)	Avg. rating	Genre	Ref.
(from 2016); 12 Dec– 1 Jan	Rogue Emperor 流氓皇帝	17	Poon Ka-tak (producer); Chan Kam-ling (writer); Kenneth Ma, Niki Chow, Benjamin Yuen, Mandy Wong, Jerry Ku, Brian Tse, Harriet Yeung, 6-Wing	"四方" (Four Sides) by Hoffman Cheng "心暖" (Love from Heart) by Kenneth Ma, Niki Chow "乾杯" (Cheers) by Hoffman Cheng, Ronald Law, Yao Bin	21	Period drama, Romantic comedy	
2 Jan– 3 Feb	Recipes to Live By 味想天開	25	Chong Wai-kin (producer); Wong Bing-yee, Chan Po-yin (writers); Tony Hung, Sisley Choi, Hugo Wong, Rebecca Zhu, Stephanie Ho, Ram Chiang, Joseph Lee, Mary Hon, Maria Cordero, Toby Leung	"天賜的滋味" (The Taste of Heaven) by Maria Cordero	22	Historical period drama, Comedy	
6 Feb– 3 Mar	Tiger Mom Blues 親親我好媽	20	Kwan Wing-chung (producer); Lo Mei-wan (writer); Elena Kong, Ben Wong, Sharon Chan, Michelle Yim, Koni Lui, Matthew Ho, Kaman Kong, Willie Wai, Angelina Lo, Savio Tsang, Arnold Kwok	"不變的愛" (Everlasting Love) by Edwin Siu	25	Family drama	
6 Mar– 7 Apr	Provocateur 與諜同謀	25	Wong Wai-sing (producer); Lam Lai-mei (writer); Gallen Lo, Fred Cheng, Ali Lee, Jacqueline Wong, Jonathan Cheung, Jack Wu, Winki Lai, Roxanne Tong, Stephanie Che	"獨來獨往" (Alone) by Gallen Lo "地盡頭" (The End of the World) by Fred Cheng	23	Crime drama	
10 Apr– 5 May	The No No Girl 全職沒女	20	Andy Chan (producer); Chan Kam-ling (writer); Eddie Cheung, Adia Chan, Owen Cheung, Jeannie Chan, Brian Tse, Erin Wong, Helena Law, Amy Fan, Max Cheung, Eileen Yeow, Griselda Yeung, Timothy Cheng, Stephen Ho, Man Yeung	"我有我美麗" (That's the Way I Am) by Nancy Wu	23	Romantic comedy	
8 May– 14 Jul	Legend of the Condor Heroes 射鵰英雄傳	49	Jeffrey Chiang (director); Jin Yong (novel); Yang Xuwen, Li Yitong, Chen Xingxu, Meng Ziyi, Ray Lui, Michael Miu	"我不歸去" (I Won't Return) by KaYee Tam	24	Historical period drama, Wuxia	
17 Jul– 27 Aug	A General, a Scholar and a Eunuch 超時空男臣	32	Marco Law (producer); Wong Wai-keung (writer); Edwin Siu, Kristal Tin, Raymond Cho, Grace Wong, Matthew Ho, Rebecca Zhu, David Chiang, James Ng	"戰勝吧" (Praise for War) by Fred Cheng "木紋" (Wood Grain) by Denise Ho	27	Sci-fi, Comedy	
28 Aug– 22 Sept	The Tofu War 燦爛的外母	20	Benjamin Au (producer); Choi Shuk-yin (writer); Nancy Sit, Lai Lok-yi, Dominic Lam, Roxanne Tong, Elaine Yiu, Jonathan Cheung, Griselda Yeung, Timothy Cheng, Maggie Yu	"家中的太陽" (The Sun At Home) by Nancy Sit	23	Family drama	
25 Sept– 03 Nov	Oh My Grad 老表，畢業喇!	30	Wong Wai-sing, Wong Cho-lam (producers); Lung Man-hong, Wong Cho-lam (writers); Roger Kwok, Ada Choi, Wong Cho-lam, Babyjohn Choi, Eliza Sam, Bob Lam, Koni Lui, Louis Cheung, Mag Lam, Joyce Cheng, Helena Law, Bowie Wu, Angela Tong, Ram Chiang	"畢業之後" (After Graduation) by Mag Lam	23	Comedy	
06 Nov– 12 Jan (to 2018)	My Ages Apart 誇世代	50	Joe Chan (producer); Kwan Chung-ling, Cheng Sing-mo (writer); Bobby Au-yeung, Moses Chan, Louis Cheung, Kristal Tin, Ali Lee, Maggie Shiu, Hui Shiu-hung, Eddie Kwan, Sammy Leung, Elena Kong, Katy Kung, David Chiang, James Ng, Anjaylia Chan, Louisa Mak, Hubert Wu, Angel Chiang, Zoie Tam, Kaman Kong, Dickson Yu, Mimi Chu, Mary Hon, Amy Fan	"誇世代" (Age Apart) by Hacken Lee "別再記起" (Do Not Remember Anymore) by Jinny Ng	24	Comedy drama	

== Third line-up ==
These dramas air in Hong Kong from 9:30pm to 10:30pm, Monday to Sunday on Jade.

Broadcast	English title (Chinese title)	Eps.	Cast and crew	Theme song(s)	Avg. rating	Genre	Ref.
(from 2016); 19 Dec– 14 Jan	No Reserve 巾幗梟雄之諜血長天	26	Lee Tim-sing (producer); Ip Kwong-yam (writer); Wayne Lai, Myolie Wu, Edwin Siu, Sire Ma, Yoyo Chen, Susan Tse, Lee Shing-cheong, Lau Kong, Cecilia Fong, Eric Li, King Kong Lee	"孤嶺花" (Solitary Flower) by Kay Tse	20	Period drama, Thriller	
16 Jan– 12 Feb	Burning Hands 乘勝狙擊	28	Yip Chun-fai (producer); Lau Chi-wah (writer); Ruco Chan, Rosina Lam, Joel Chan, Kelly Fu, Pal Sinn, Hugo Ng, Rebecca Chan, Rosanne Lui, Hugo Wong, Jacquelin Ch'ng, Pat Poon, Tsui Wing, Stefan Wong, Candice Chiu, Jazz Lam, Geoffrey Wong, Chui Chung-san, Lau Kong, Alex Tse, Ken Law, Chun Kai Wai, Nicole Leung, Lena Wong, Joe Junior, Bob Cheung, Ricky Wong, Otto Chan	"Strike" music by Damon Chui "Love Story Background Music" by Hou Yean Cha	23	Crime thriller	
13 Feb– 12 Mar	Destination Nowhere 迷	30	Amy Wong (producer); Ng Siu-tung, Mary Lui (writers); Kevin Cheng, Kristal Tin, King Kong Lee, James Ng, Louis Yuen, Jessica Kan, Winki Lai, May Chan, Tyson Chak, Sam Tsang, Becky Lee, Lisa Lau, Parkman Wong, William Chak, Gary Tam, Toby Chan	"迷" (Lost) by Fred Cheng	22	Suspense, Crime thriller	
13 Mar– 02 Apr	Married but Available 我瞞結婚了	20	Leung Choi-yuen (producer); Choi Shuk-yin (writer); Tony Hung, Priscilla Wong, Raymond Wong Ho-yin, Alice Chan, Kelly Fu, Hugo Ng, Jacquelin Ch'ng, C Kwan, Cilia Kung, Amy Fan, Stefan Wong, Joseph Lee, Erin Wong, Gary Chan, Emily Wong, Lee Yee-Man	"真心真意" (With All My Heart) by Fred Cheng & Stephanie Ho "印記" (Seal of Love) by KaYee Tam	20	Romantic drama	
03 Apr – 30 Apr	My Dearly Sinful Mind 心理追兇	28	Wong Wai-yan (producer); Choi Ting-ting, Sin Siu-ling, Lee Yee-wah (writers); Kenneth Ma, Sisley Choi, Mat Yeung, Raymond Cho, Grace Wong, Ngo Ka-nin, Vivien Yeo, Willie Wai, Jade Leung, Jack Wu, Roxanne Tong, Stephen Wong Ka-lok, Kent Tong, Michelle Yim, Anthony Ho, Patrick Dunn	"籠牢" (Cage) by Alfred Hui "你走的那個晚上" (You Leave During The Night) by Fred Cheng	21	Crime drama	
1 May– 28 May	My Unfair Lady 不懂撒嬌的女人	28	Kwan Shu-ming (producer); Chu King-kei, Lau Siu-kwan (writers); Frankie Lam, Jessica Hsuan, Vincent Wong, Natalie Tong, Samantha Ko, Lai Lok-yi, Max Cheung, Zoie Tam, Lau Dan, Maggie Yu, Nathan Ngai, Andrew Yuen Man-kit, Mico Chang, Hoi Yeung, Kaman Kong, Snow Suen, Gloria Tang	"我不會撒嬌" (I Don't Know How to Act Cute) by Stephanie Ho "手中沙" (Sand in Hands) by Hana Kuk "陪著你走" (Walking By Your Side) by KaYee Tam	24	Romantic comedy	
29 May– 18 Jun	Phoenix Rising 蘭花劫	20	Terry Tong (producer); Chan Kam-ling (writer); Louisa So, Kristal Tin, Leila Tong, Sunny Chan, Ben Wong, Jack Wu, Manna Chan, Eileen Yeow, Law Lok-lam, Lily Li, Miguel Choi, Rachel Kan, Alice Fung So-bor, Jerry Ku, Nancy Wu	"用愛邁步" (Use Love to Take Steps) by Kelly Chen	18	Period drama	

Starting on 19 June 2017, these dramas air in Hong Kong every Monday to Friday nights from 9:30pm to 10:30pm on Jade.

Broadcast	English title (Chinese title)	Eps.	Cast and crew	Theme song(s)	Avg. rating	Genre	Ref.
19 Jun– 04 Aug	Bet Hur 澳門群英會	35	Wong Jing (producer); Steve Cheng, Leung Yik-hong (writers); Patrick Tse, Natalis Chan, Charmaine Sheh, Kenneth Ma, Raymond Wong Ho-yin, Lau Siu-ming, Monica Chan, Mat Yeung, Dominic Ho, Samantha Ko, Connie Man, Carlo Ng, Marco Lo, Jade Leung, Jess Sum, Louisa Mak, Dada Wong, Carmen Tong, Iris Chung, Katy Kung, Bowie Wu, Ben Cheung, Johnny Ngan	"十倍奉還" (Payback) by Fred Cheng	23	Crime drama	
07 Aug– 13 Sep	The Unholy Alliance 同盟	28	Jazz Boon (producer); Ng Lap-kwong (writers); Paw Hee-ching, Ruco Chan, Nancy Wu, Joel Chan, Elaine Yiu, Kwok Fung, Jimmy Au, KK Cheung, Elena Kong, Law Lok-lam, Oscar Leung, Mary Hon, Carlo Ng, Ngo Ka-nin, Jazz Lam, Timothy Cheng, Stephen Ho, Lily Leung, Belle Lam, Griselda Yeung, Kimmy Kwan, Arnold Kwok, Man Yeung, Mandy Lam, Lau Kong, Stephen Wong Ka-lok	"一觸即發" (Lit By A Spark) by Ruco Chan "風的季節" (The Season Of The Wind) by Rosanne Lui	28	Crime drama, Action, Martial arts	
18 Sep– 27 Oct	Line Walker: The Prelude 使徒行者2	30	So Man-chung (producer); Yip Tin-shing, Steffie Lai (writers); Michael Miu, Moses Chan, Jessica Hsuan, Benjamin Yuen, Pakho Chau, Priscilla Wong, Hui Shiu-hung, Louisa Mak, Vincent Lam, Nathan Ngai, Stanley Cheung, Brian Tse, Eddie Cheung, Alice Chan, Kenny Wong, Tony Hung, Stephanie Ho, Joman Chiang, Kandy Wong, Gill Mohindepaul Singh, Jack Hui, Penny Chan, Otto Chan, Ho Chun-Hin, Kenneth Ma	"天網" (Skynet) by Pakho Chau "忘記我自己" (Forgot Myself) by Hana Kuk "安守本份" (Behave Oneself) by Vivian Koo	24	Crime, Thriller	
30 Oct– 26 Nov	The Exorcist’s Meter 降魔的	21	Dave Fong (producer); Law Pui-ching (writer); Kenneth Ma, Mandy Wong, Hubert Wu, Moon Lau, Helen Ma, Hugo Wong, Steve Lee, Ram Chiang, Susan Tse, Willie Wai, Raymond Chiu, Savio Tsang, Kayee Tam, June Ng, Henry Lo, Kitty Yuen, King Kong Lee, Lau Kong, Ngai Wan-Man, Iris Lam, Tony Hung	“到此一游” (I Was Here) by Hubert Wu "遥不可及" (Out Of Reach) by Hubert Wu "泣血薔薇" (Bleeding Rose) by Jinny Ng	25	Fantasy, Comedy, Horror	
27 Nov– 19 Jan (to 2018)	Heart and Greed 溏心風暴3	40	Lau Ka-ho, Tsui Yu-on (producers); Sham Kwok-wing, Leong Man-wah (writers); Louise Lee, Ha Yu, Michelle Yim, Susanna Kwan, Louis Yuen, Bosco Wong, Vincent Wong, Eliza Sam, Priscilla Wong, Sharon Chan, Yumiko Cheng, Bianca Wu, Michael Tong, Steven Ma, Joseph Lee, Ben Wong, Chow Chung, Liza Wang, Nora Miao, Maria Cordero, Jason Chan Chi-san, Luk Ho-ming	”我本無罪” (I Am Innocent) by Susanna Kwan ”欲言又止”(To Want To Say) by Vincent Wong & Hana Kuk	23	Family drama	

== Weekend dramas ==
Starting on 24 June 2017, these dramas air in Hong Kong on Saturday and Sunday nights from 9:30pm to 10:30pm on Jade.

Starting on 24 September 2017, these dramas air in Hong Kong will rescheduled every Sunday nights from 8:30pm to 10:30pm followed by back-to-back with two episodes on Jade.

Broadcast	English title (Chinese title)	Eps.	Cast and crew	Theme song(s)	Avg. rating	Genre	Notes	Official website
24 Jun– 17 Sept	Legal Mavericks 踩過界	28	Lam Chi-wah (producer); Lau Choi-wan, Chan Kei, Lee Yee-wah (writers); Vincent Wong, Sisley Choi, Ali Lee, Owen Cheung, Pal Sinn, Tracy Chu, Gilbert Lam, Hugo Wong, William Chak, Quinn Ho, Jack Hui, Zoie Tam	"心眼" (Insight) by Vincent Wong "愛近在眼前" (In Front of Love) by Stephanie Ho	21	Legal drama, Crime	iQIYI co-production	
24 Sept– 03 Dec	Nothing Special Force 雜警奇兵	20	Ng Koon-yu (producer); Yung Sin-ying, Cheung Chung-chai (writers); Ben Wong, Mandy Wong, Jacqueline Wong, C Kwan, Joseph Lee, Geoffrey Wong, Amy Fan, Arnold Kwok, Rebecca Chan, Angel Chiang, Joyce Tang	"快樂快活人" (Joyful Man) by KaYee Tam	17	Police comedy		
10 Dec– 11 Feb (to 2018)	Come with Me 性在有情	18	Jazz Boon (producer); Leung Yan-tung (writer); Eddie Cheung, Sharon Chan, Elena Kong, Louis Yuen, Hui Shiu-hung, Sammy Sum, May Chan, Grace Wong, Helena Law, Chung King-fai, Angelina Lo	"講" (Speak) by Sharon Chan, Louis Yuen, Grace Wong, Hoffman Cheng, Stephanie Ho, Ronald Law	17	Comedy drama		

== Notes ==
- Phoenix Rising (蘭花劫); Released overseas on July 9, 2007. Copyright notice: 2007.
- Come with Me (性在有情); Released June 5, 2016. Copyright notice: 2016.
