= 2017 TVB Star Awards Malaysia =

- Date: 25 November 2017
- Location: Arena of Stars

Television/radio coverage
- Network: Astro Wah Lai Toi, TVB Jade (Hong Kong) TVB Entertainment News (Hong Kong)
- Produced by: TVB Entertainment News

The 2017 TVB Star Awards Malaysia (simplified Chinese: TVB 马来西亚星光荟萃颁奖典礼2017; traditional Chinese: TVB 馬來西亞星光薈萃頒獎典禮2017), presented by TVB Entertainment News, Astro, MY FM, and MELODY FM in Malaysia, is an awards ceremony that recognises the best Hong Kong TVB television programmes that aired on Malaysia's Astro On Demand and Astro Wah Lai Toi in 2017. It was held on 25 November 2017 at the Arena of Stars, Genting Highlands in Kuala Lumpur, Malaysia, and was broadcast live through Malaysia's Astro Wah Lai Toi, Hong Kong's TVB Jade, and TVB Entertainment News . The ceremony was hosted by Carol Cheng, FAMA, Mayanne Mak, Luk Ho-ming, and Jarvis Chow.

== Winners and nominees ==
The winners included Legal Mavericks and Michael Miu for his role as Inspector Cheuk Hoi in Line Walker: The Prelude.

=== Programs ===
My Favourite TVB Drama Series	My Favourite TVB Drama Theme Song
Legal Mavericks; The Unholy Alliance; Line Walker: The Prelude; Dead Wrong; Rogue Emperor; No Reserve; Recipes to Live By; Burning Hands; Tiger Mom Blues; Destination Nowhere; Provocateur; My Dearly Sinful Mind; The No No Girl; My Unfair Lady; Married But Available; Come With Me; Bet Hur; A General, a Scholar, and a Eunuch; The Tofu War; Nothing Special Force; Oh My Grad	"Sand in Hands" (手中沙) from My Unfair Lady – performed by Hana Kuk; "Walk with You" (陪着你走) from My Unfair Lady – performed by Kayee Tam; "Insight" (心眼) from Legal Mavericks – performed by Vincent Wong; "In Front of Love" (爱近在眼前) from Legal Mavericks – performed by Stephanie Ho; "Skynet" (天网) from Line Walker: The Prelude – performed by Pakho Chau
My Favourite TVB Variety Program	My Favourite TVB Enrichment Program
The Sisterhood Traveling Gang; Spirits On Vacation; Maria's Auspicious Menu; All Work No Pay Holidays (Sr. 2); Priscilla's Fun Cooking Challenge; Peak to Pit; Anchors with Passport (Sr. 3); Cantopop at 50; The Ahistoric Grandpa Cooking Show; Sammy On the Go	All Things Girl (Malaysia Ver., Sr. 3); Neighborhood Treasures (Sr. 7); Easy Come Easy Health; Retiring in Paradise; Sidewalk Scientist (Sr. 5); Big Big World (Sr. 3); Sermon by Sir Ben 2; Litigation @ Home; Faraway Brides

=== Acting and hosting ===
My Favourite TVB Actor in a Leading Role	My Favourite TVB Actress in a Leading Role
Michael Miu – Line Walker: The Prelude as Inspector Cheuk Hoi; Vincent Wong – Legal Mavericks as Man Sun-hap; Ruco Chan – The Unholy Alliance as Ko Tsz-kit; Wayne Lai – No Reserve as Kong Sheung-hung / Kong Hung / Suzuki Kazuo; Ben Wong – Tiger Mom Blues as Yim Ha; Kevin Cheng – Destination Nowhere as Man Kiu-pak; Gallen Lo – Provocateur as "King" Cheuk Kwan-lam; Tony Hung – Married but Available as Tony Au-yeung Chi-chung; Kenneth Ma – My Dearly Sinful Mind as Dr. Chung Tai-yin (TY); Eddie Cheung – The No No Girl as Richmond Chong Fu-ho; Frankie Lam – My Unfair Lady as Gordon Man Nim-sam; Edwin Siu – A General, a Scholar, and a Eunuch as Yuan Chonghuan / Wan Tai-kwan; Raymond Cho – A General, a Scholar, and a Eunuch as Zuo Guangdou / Fung Yat-bo; Matthew Ho – A General, a Scholar, and a Eunuch as Li Junchong / Lee Siu-tung; Lai Lok-yi – The Tofu War as Samuel Wong Siu-ming; Pakho Chau – Line Walker: The Prelude as Lok Siu-fung; Benjamin Yuen – Line Walker: The Prelude as Tsui Tin-tong; Wong Cho-lam – Oh My Grad as Choi Sum / Yau Tin; Roger Kwok – Oh My Grad as To Ming-chi	Jessica Hsuan – My Unfair Lady as Molly Ling Man; Ali Lee – Legal Mavericks as Cherry "Never" Wong Lai-fan; Nancy Wu – The Unholy Alliance as Yuen Tsing-yan; Joey Meng – Dead Wrong as Cathy Yuen Kiu; Niki Chow – Rogue Emperor as Yik Yung-yung / Mo Sze-yan; Myolie Wu – No Reserve as Cheung Kei-sang; Rosina Lam – Burning Hands as "Win Jeh" Ho Ching-fa; Elena Kong – Tiger Mom Blues as Natalie Cha Heung-sin; Sharon Chan – Tiger Mom Blues as Claire Man Ka-hei; Kristal Tin – Destination Nowhere as Cal Kai Wing-yin; Adia Chan – The No No Girl as Law Lai-ching; Grace Wong – My Dearly Sinful Mind as Wong Hoi-ching; Natalie Tong – My Unfair Lady as Cherry Ling Yu-kan; Charmaine Sheh – Bet Hur as Sze Siu-tung; Sisley Choi – Legal Mavericks as Chiu Ching-mui; Paw Hee-ching – The Unholy Alliance as Ling Hung; Nancy Sit – The Tofu War as Siu Sau-king; Priscilla Wong – Line Walker: The Prelude as Cheng Shuk-mui; Mandy Wong – Nothing Special Force as Lisa Lung Lai-sa; Ada Choi – Oh My Grad as Cheung Chun-keung
My Favourite TVB Actor in a Supporting Role	My Favourite TVB Actress in a Supporting Role
Joel Chan – The Unholy Alliance as Ling Tsin-yau; Owen Cheung – Legal Mavericks as Gogo Kuk Yat-ha; Mat Yeung – My Dearly Sinful Mind as Tung Yat / "Day; James Ng – Destination Nowhere as Lam Ga Wing; Pierre Ngo – My Dearly Sinful Mind as Wu Tin Yeung; Ram Chiang – Oh My Grad as the Ching Long; Dominic Lam – The Tofu War as Tou Wai Lung; Yuen Man Kit – My Unfair Lady as Yam Jun Kit; Kenny Wong – Dead Wrong as Lam Ho-yan; C-Kwan – Nothing Special Force as Che Yik Sun	Elaine Yiu – The Unholy Alliance as Kate Wai Yi-yau; Tracy Chu – Legal Mavericks as Dai Tin Yan; Samantha Ko – My Unfair Lady as Tin Mut; Jacqueline Wong – Provocateur as Cheuk Man-lei; Koni Lui – Tiger Mom Blues as Rebecca Yuen Yuen; Rebecca Chu – A General, A Scholar and A Eunuch as Fong Wai-ling; Alice Chan – Married But Available as Carol; Eliza Sam – Oh My Grad as Lau Nau; Roxanne Tong – The Tofu War as Szeto Nam; Jeannie Chan – The No No Girl as Miu Si
My Favourite TVB Most Improved Actor	My Favourite TVB Most Improved Actress
Matthew Ho – Tiger Mom Blues and A General, A Scholar and A Eunuch; Owen Cheung – The No No Girl and Legal Mavericks; James Ng – Destination Nowhere and A General, A Scholar and A Eunuch; Arnold Kwok – Tiger Mom Blues and Nothing Special Force; Brian Tse – Rogue Emperor, The No No Girl and Line Walker: The Prelude	Zoie Tam – Legal Mavericks, Dead Wrong and My Unfair Lady; Gloria Tang – A General, A Scholar and A Eunuch and My Unfair Lady; Roxanne Tong – Provocateur, My Dearly Sinful Mind and The Tofu War; Kaman Kong – Tiger Mom Blues and My Unfair Lady; Jeannie Chan – The No No Girl
My Favourite TVB On-Screen Couple	My Favourite TVB Host In Variety Program
Ruco Chan and Nancy Wu – The Unholy Alliance; Vincent Wong and Natalie Tong – My Unfair Lady; Joel Chan and Elaine Yiu – The Unholy Alliance; Owen Cheung and Ali Lee – Legal Mavericks; Vincent Wong, Tracy Chu and Sisley Choi – Legal Mavericks; Edwin Siu and Kristal Tin – A General, A Scholar and A Eunuch; Chris Lai and Roxanne Tong – The Tofu War; Benjamin Yuen, Chow PakHo and Priscilla Wong – Line Walker: The Prelude; Moses Chan and Jessica Hsuan – Line Walker: The Prelude; Frankie Lam and Jessica Hsuan – My Unfair Lady	Maria Cordero – Maria’s Auspicious Recipes; Benjamin Yuen and Mat Yeung – All Work, No Pay Holidays; Myolie Wu, Elaine Yiu, Selena Lee, Nancy Wu, Mandy Wong, and Paisley Wu – The Sisterhood Travelling Gang; Ashley Chu, Mayanne Mak, Alycia Chan, Brian Tse, Kenny Wong, and Chris Leung – Peak To Pit; Nancy Sit, Raymond Cho, Michael Lai and Tong Bo Yu – Cantopop At 50; Tony Hung – Retiring In Paradise; Steve Lee and Helen Tam – The Ahistoric Grandpa Cooking Show; Elena Kong, Priscilla Wong, Joyce Tang, Elaine Yiu, Katy Kung, Sarah Song and Sharon Chan – All Things Girl Malaysia Edition; Janis Chan – Faraway Brides; Sammy Leung, Mayanne Mak, Samantha Ko and Jacqueline Wong – Sammy On The Go
My Favourite TVB Drama Characters	Online Most Beloved Star Award 2017
Ruco Chan as Ko Tsz Kit in The Unholy Alliance; Nancy Wu as Yuen Ching Yan in The Unholy Alliance; Edwin Siu as Yuan Chong Huan/Wan Tai Kuan in A General, A Scholar and A Eunuch; Kristal Tin as Fong Wai Chi in A General, A Scholar and A Eunuch; Raymond Cho as Zuo Guang Dou/Fung Yat Bo in A General, A Scholar and A Eunuch; Rebecca Zhu as Fung Wai Ling in A General, A Scholar and A Eunuch; Vincent Wong as Hope Man San Hap in Legal Mavericks; Sisley Choi as Chiu Ching Mui in Legal Mavericks; Ali Lee as Cherry Never Wong Lai Fan in Legal Mavericks; Michael Miu as Cheuk Hoi in Line Walker: The Prelude; Benjamin Yuen as Chui Tin Tong in Line Walker: The Prelude; Priscilla Wong as Cheng Suk Moi in Line Walker: The Prelude; Jessica Hsuan as Molly in My Unfair Lady; Chris Lai as Hanson in My Unfair Lady; Natalie Tong as Cherry in My Unfair Lady; Samantha Ko as Tin Mut in My Unfair Lady; Ben Wong as Yim Ha in Tiger Mom Blues	
