= StarHub TVB Awards =

- Awarded for: Excellence in TVB programming
- Country: Singapore
- Presented by: StarHub
- First award: 29 January 2010
- Website: starhubtvbawards.com

The StarHub TVB Awards (simplified Chinese: 星和无线电视大奖; traditional Chinese: 星和無綫電視大獎) is an awards ceremony held every year to recognise the achievements by Hong Kong television dramas and artists in Singapore. The awards are presented by StarHub, VV Drama, and E City, and are given for TVB productions and performances. The inaugural StarHub TVB Awards were held on 29 January 2010.

The nominations for StarHub TVB Awards are jointly determined by StarHub and TVB for TVB programmes shown on VV Drama, E City, TVBJ and TVB First on Demand throughout the designated year. The final results are decided by online voting (70%) and a panel of professional judges (30%).

== 2010 ==
The StarHub TVB Awards 2010 were held on 29 January 2010 at The Ritz-Carlton Millenia Singapore. Singaporean radio presenter Wenhong Huang and 2001 Miss Hong Kong Pageant second runner-up Heidi Chu hosted the awards ceremony, presenting a total of 18 awards.. The ceremony aired on VV Drama on 14 February 2010.

Winners list

My Favourite TVB Actress

- Charmaine Sheh — Forensic Heroes II

My Favourite TVB Actor

- Raymond Lam — Moonlight Resonance

My Favourite TVB Drama

- Moonlight Resonance

Most Unforgettable TVB Drama

- War and Beauty

Most Unforgettable TVB Female TV Character

- Nancy Sit as Leung Yun-ho — A Kindred Spirit

Most Unforgettable TVB Male TV Character

- Roger Kwok as Ding Sheung-won — Square Pegs

My Favourite TVB Variety Programme

- Be My Guest

My Favourite TVB Female TV Character

- Louise Lee as Chung Siu-ho — Moonlight Resonance
- Tavia Yeung as Suen Ho-yue — Moonlight Resonance
- Susanna Kwan as Chung Siu-sa — Moonlight Resonance
- Fala Chen as Kam Wing-hing — Moonlight Resonance
- Sonija Kwok as Ying Ching-ching — D.I.E.
- Charmaine Sheh as Ma Kwok-ying — Forensic Heroes II

My Favourite TVB Male TV Character

- Raymond Lam as Kam Wing-ho — Moonlight Resonance
- Moses Chan as Kam Wing-ka — Moonlight Resonance
- Wayne Lai as Chai Kau — Rosy Business
- Roger Kwok as Yue Chi-long — D.I.E.
- Steven Ma as Tse Wong-sheung — The Gentle Crackdown II

== 2011 ==
The StarHub TVB Awards 2011 were held on 16 July 2011 at Marina Bay Sands in Singapore, hosted by Astrid Chan and King Kong Lee. The ceremony aired on VV Drama on 24 July 2011.

Winners list

My Favourite TVB Drama

- No Regrets

My Favourite TVB Actress

- Charmaine Sheh — Can't Buy Me Love

My Favourite TVB Actor

- Moses Chan — Can't Buy Me Love

My Favourite TVB Female TV Characters

- Myolie Wu as Keung Keung — The Rippling Blossom
- Fala Chen as Lau Ching — No Regrets
- Kate Tsui as Ko Lai-sam — When Lanes Merge
- Tavia Yeung as Tsui Siu-lai — The Mysteries of Love
- Sheren Tang as Cheng Kau-mui — No Regrets

My Favourite TVB Male TV Characters

- Julian Cheung as Yue Chi-ying — The Rippling Blossom
- Bosco Wong as Linus Chung — Growing Through Life
- Raymond Lam as Kingsley King — The Mysteries of Love
- Kevin Cheng as Ku Yun-cheung — A Fistful of Stances
- Wayne Lai as Lau Sing — No Regrets

Most Improved TVB Artist Award

- King Kong Lee and Natalie Tong

My Favourite TVB On-Screen Couple

- Charmaine Sheh and Moses Chan— Can't Buy Me Love

Best On-Screen Chemistry Award

- Myolie Wu and Julian Cheung — The Rippling Blossom

My Favourite TVB Theme Song

- "We Are Well" (我们很好) by Raymond Lam (The Mysteries of Love sub-theme)

My Favorite TVB Mega Variety Special
My Favorite TVB Variety Programme

- Fun with Liza and Gods

Professional Achievement Award

- Louise Lee

Most Energetic Award

- Kate Tsui

Best Smile Award

- Fala Chen

== 2012 ==
The StarHub TVB Awards 2012 were held on 18 August 2012 at Marina Bay Sands Expo and Convention Centre in Singapore, hosted by Astrid Chan and King Kong Lee. 30 awards from 19 categories were presented. The ceremony aired on VV Drama on 25 August 2012.

Winners list

My Favourite TVB Drama

- When Heaven Burns

My Favourite TVB Actress

- Myolie Wu — Ghetto Justice

My Favourite TVB Actor

- Kevin Cheng — Ghetto Justice

My Favourite TVB Female TV Characters

- Linda Chung as Kwan Ka-lok — L'Escargot
- Kate Tsui as Paris Yiu — Lives of Omission
- Tavia Yeung as Fan Tze-yu — The Hippocratic Crush
- Myolie Wu as Kris Wong — Ghetto Justice
- Charmaine Sheh as Hazel "Yan" Yip — When Heaven Burns
- Fala Chen as Chung Mo-yim — Queens of Diamonds and Hearts

My Favourite TVB Male TV Characters

- Moses Chan as Angus Sung — When Heaven Burns
- Kenneth Ma as Cheung Yat-kin — The Hippocratic Crush
- Kevin Cheng as Law Lik-ah — Ghetto Justice
- Bosco Wong as Michael So — Lives of Omission
- Sunny Chan as the Daoguang Emperor — Curse of the Royal Harem
- Wayne Lai as Jack Po — Forensic Heroes III

Most Improved TVB Female Artist

- Selena Li

Most Improved TVB Male Artist

- Raymond Wong Ho-yin

Best TVB Female Newcomer

- Aimee Chan

Best TVB Male Newcomer

- Ruco Chan

My Favourite TVB On-Screen Couple

- Linda Chung and Moses Chan — Yes, Sir. Sorry, Sir!

Singapore Media's Favourite TVB Drama

- Ghetto Justice

My Favourite TVB Variety Programme

- All Star Glam Exam

My Favourite TVB Mega Variety Special

- TVB 44th Anniversary Gala

My Favourite TVB Theme Song

- "Serial Drama" (连续剧) by Joey Yung (for The Hippocratic Crush)

Professional Spirit Award

- Wu Fung

Most Glamorous Female Artist Award

- Tavia Yeung

Star of Perfect Poise Award

- Kate Tsui

Most Energetic Award

- Kenny Wong

Best Smile Award

- Linda Chung

== 2013 ==
The StarHub TVB Awards 2013 were held on 28 September 2013 at Marina Bay Sands Grand Theatre in Singapore, hosted by King Kong Lee and Elaine Yiu. 20 categories were presented. The ceremony aired on TVB8 and StarHub's VV Drama on 5 October 2013.

Winners list

My Favourite TVB Drama

- Triumph In the Skies II

My Favourite TVB Actress

- Tavia Yeung — Silver Spoon, Sterling Shackles

My Favourite TVB Actor

- Bosco Wong — Witness Insecurity

My Favourite TVB Female TV Characters

- Niki Chow as Yuen Siu-kat — A Change of Heart
- Michelle Yim as Empress Dowager Cixi — The Confidant
- Linda Chung as Hailey Kiu — Witness Insecurity
- Kate Tsui as Chan Ka-pik — Highs and Lows
- Myolie Wu as Summer Ha — Triumph In the Skies II
- Tavia Yeung as Hong Chi-kwan — Silver Spoon, Sterling Shackles

My Favourite TVB Male TV Characters

- Ruco Chan as Kevin Ching — Slow Boat Home
- Bosco Wong as Sam Hui — Witness Insecurity
- Raymond Lam as Wai Sai-lok — Highs and Lows
- Julian Cheung as Jayden Koo — Triumph In the Skies II
- Kenneth Ma as Szema Shun — Three Kingdoms RPG
- Moses Chan as Ko Lau-fei — Beauty at War

Classic TVB Character

- Michael Miu in The Legend of the Condor Heroes, The Fearless Duo, The New Adventures of Chor Lau-heung, and A Change of Heart

Most Improved TVB Actress

- Mandy Wong

Most Improved TVB Actor

- Him Law

Best New TVB Actress

- Christine Kuo

Best New TVB Actor

- Jason Chan Chi-san

My Favourite TVB On-Screen Couple

- Niki Chow and Bosco Wong — A Change of Heart

Singapore Media's Favourite TVB Drama

- Triumph In the Skies II

My Favourite TVB Variety Programme

- Lady First Singapore

My Favourite TVB Mega Variety Special

- TVB Golden Viva Spectacular

My Favourite TVB Theme Song

- "Little Something" by Mag Lam (for Season of Love)

My Favourite TVB Variety Programme Host

- Pauline Lan for Lady First Singapore

Most Glamorous Female Artist Award

- Kate Tsui

Star of Perfect Poise Award

- Raymond Lam

Everlasting Glow Award

- Linda Chung

Red Carpet Star Award

- Linda Chung

== 2014 ==
The StarHub TVB Awards 2014 were held on 11 October 2014 at Marina Bay Sands in Singapore, hosted by Carol Cheng and Derek Li. 17 categories were presented. The ceremony was broadcast live on StarHub's VV Drama.

Winners list

My Favourite TVB Drama

- Black Heart White Soul

My Favourite TVB Actress

- Charmaine Sheh — Line Walker

My Favourite TVB Actor

- Ruco Chan — Ruse of Engagement

My Favourite TVB Supporting Actress

- Sharon Chan — The Ultimate Addiction

My Favourite TVB Supporting Actor

- Him Law — The Hippocratic Crush II

My Favourite TVB Female TV Characters

- Charmaine Sheh as Ding Siu-ka — Line Walker
- Nancy Wu as Anson Fong — The Ultimate Addiction
- Tavia Yeung as Tong Bing-bing — Storm In a Cocoon
- Linda Chung as To Kai-kei — All That Is Bitter Is Sweet
- Kate Tsui as Jennifer Shing — Bounty Lady
- Kristal Tin as May Tam — Black Heart White Soul

My Favourite TVB Male TV Characters

- Wong Cho-lam as Ko Tin-po — Gilded Chopsticks
- Roger Kwok as Matt Ko — Black Heart White Soul
- Ruco Chan as Sam Kiu — Brother's Keeper
- Bosco Wong as Damon Cheuk — The Ultimate Addiction
- Kenneth Ma as Chu Cheung-shing — Ghost Dragon of Cold Mountain
- Edwin Siu as Lo Wai-son — Brother's Keeper

Most Improved TVB Artist

- Eliza Sam

Best New TVB Artist

- Louis Cheung

My Favourite TVB On-Screen Couple

- Kristal Tin and Roger Kwok — Black Heart White Soul

Singapore Media's Favourite TVB Drama

- Line Walker

My Favourite TVB Variety/Infotainment Programme

- Walk the Walk, Talk the Talk

My Favourite TVB Variety Special

- A Time of Love

My Favourite TVB Theme Song

- "Really Want to Hate You" (很想讨厌你) by Rosina Lam (for Outbound Love)

My Favourite TVB Variety Programme Host

- Nancy Sit and Wong Cho-lam for Walk the Walk, Talk the Talk

Everlasting Glow Award (Jean Yip Hair Salon)

- Kate Tsui

Red Carpet Star Award

- Linda Chung

== 2015 ==
The StarHub TVB Awards 2015 were held on 24 October 2015 at Marina Bay Sands in Singapore, hosted by Carol Cheng, Derek Li, and Amigo Choi. The ceremony aired on TVB Jade on 1 November 2015.

Winners list

My Favourite TVB Drama

- Captain of Destiny

SG50—Star of the Stars

- Liza Wang and Adam Cheng

My Favourite TVB Actress

- Liza Wang — Limelight Years

My Favourite TVB Actor

- Ruco Chan — Captain of Destiny

My Favourite TVB Supporting Actress

- Rosina Lam — Young Charioteers

My Favourite TVB Supporting Actor

- Vincent Wong — Tomorrow Is Another Day

My Favourite TVB Female TV Characters

- Eliza Sam as Lau Yee / Hung Mau-dan — Under the Veil
- Tavia Yeung as Jan Ng — Eye In the Sky
- Nancy Wu as Gin Keung — Ghost of Relativity
- Kristal Tin as May Suen — Ghost of Relativity
- Linda Chung as Chung Wai-yan — Tiger Cubs II
- Selena Li as Cecilia Choi — Brick Slaves
- Priscilla Wong as Fa Ping — Madam Cutie On Duty

My Favourite TVB Male TV Characters

- Kenneth Ma as To Chun-fung — Noblesse Oblige
- Wayne Lai as Mike Chiang — Overachievers
- Moses Chan as Kam Yin-chung — Every Step You Take
- Lawrence Ng as Man Sheung-shing — Tomorrow Is Another Day
- Edwin Siu as Law Dai-shu — Madam Cutie On Duty
- Louis Cheung as Kam Wah — Momentary Lapse of Reason

Most Improved TVB Artist

- Tracy Chu

Best New TVB Artist

- Grace Chan

My Favourite TVB On-Screen Couple

- Priscilla Wong and Edwin Siu — Madam Cutie On Duty

My Favourite TVB Variety Programme

- Sunday Songbird

My Favourite TVB Informative Programme

- Not Far But Away

My Favourite TVB Variety Show Host

- Liza Wang, Adam Cheng, and Jerry Lamb for Sunday Songbird

My Favourite TVB Theme Song

- "The Truth" (真相) by Alfred Hui and Hubert Wu (for Eye In the Sky)

Bottomslim The Perfect Figure Award

- Linda Chung

Tokyo Bust Express the Sassy Award

- Grace Chan

== 2016 ==
The StarHub TVB Awards 2016 was held on 22 October 2016 at Marina Bay Sands in Singapore. It was hosted by Carol Cheng and FAMA

Winners list

My Favourite TVB Drama

- A Fist Within Four Walls

My Favourite TVB Actress

- Nancy Wu — A Fist Within Four Walls

My Favourite TVB Actor

- Ruco Chan — A Fist Within Four Walls
- Wayne Lai — Short End of the Stick

My Favourite TVB Supporting Actress

- Rosina Lam — Short End of the Stick

My Favourite TVB Supporting Actor

- Raymond Cho — Short End of the Stick

My Favourite TVB Female TV Characters

- Kristal Tin as Yiu Man-ying — Brother's Keeper II
- Mandy Wong as Martha Fong — Law dis-Order
- Alice Chan as Yiu Kwai-sang — Lord of Shanghai
- Grace Wong as Fa Man — A Fist Within Four Walls
- Selena Li as Princess Yuet-ngah, Chong Wing-yee, and Faye Ling — Presumed Accidents
- Tracy Chu as WST Ling Sun-fung — Over Run Over

My Favourite TVB Male TV Characters

- Edwin Siu as Lo Wai-son — Brother's Keeper II
- Benjamin Yuen as Duen Ying-fung — A Fist Within Four Walls
- Moses Chan as Yip Long — Fashion War
- Kenneth Ma as young Kiu Ngo-tin — Lord of Shanghai
- Bobby Au-yeung as Po Foon — House of Spirits
- Vincent Wong as Kwang Ding-ming — Over Run Over

Most Improved TVB Artist

- Ali Lee, Mat Yeung

Best New TVB Artist

- Moon Lau, Matthew Ho

My Favourite TVB Variety Programme

- Eating Well with Madam Wong: Singapore Edition

My Favourite TVB Infotainment Programme

- Not Far But Away: Cuba

My Favourite TVB Variety Show Host

- Carol Cheng, FAMA — Do Did Eat

My Favourite TVB On-Screen Couple

- Nancy Wu and Ruco Chan — A Fist Within Four Walls
- Grace Wong and Benjamin Yuen — A Fist Within Four Walls

My Favourite TVB Drama Theme Song

- "Never Know You Are the Best" (从未知道你最好) by Ruco Chan and Nancy Wu (for A Fist Within Four Walls)

Bottomslim The Perfect Figure Award

- Rosina Lam

Tokyo Bust Express the Sassy Award

- Tracy Chu

== 2017 ==
The StarHub TVB Awards 2017 was held on 21 October 2017 at Marina Bay Sands in Singapore. It was hosted by Lawrence Cheng and Mayenne Mak

Winners & Nominees list

My Favourite TVB Drama

- The Unholy Alliance
- Two Steps From Heaven
- Burning Hands
- Destination Nowhere
- My Dearly Sinful Mind
- My Unfair Lady
- Tiger Mom Blues
- A General, A Scholar And A Eunuch
- Legal Mavericks
- Line Walker: The Prelude
- Oh My Grad
- Dead Wrong
- Provocateur
- The No No Girl
- Bet Hur
- The Tofu War
- Married But Available
- Nothing Special Force
- My Lover From The Planet Meow
- No Reserve

My Favourite TVB Actress

- Ali Lee — Legal Mavericks
- Kristal Tin — Destination Nowhere
- Jessica Hsuan — My Unfair Lady
- Nancy Wu — The Unholy Alliance
- Elena Kong — Tiger Mom Blues
- Nancy Sit — The Tofu War
- Ada Choi — Oh My Grad
- Rosina Lam — Burning Hands
- Grace Wong — A General, A Scholar And A Eunuch
- Adia Chan — The No No Girl
- Nina Paw — The Unholy Alliance
- Mandy Wong — Nothing Special Force
- Sisley Choi — Legal Mavericks
- Charmaine Sheh — Bet Hur
- Niki Chow — Rogue Emperor
- Priscilla Wong — Line Walker: The Prelude
- Myolie Wu — No Reserve
- Natalie Tong — My Unfair Lady

My Favourite TVB Actor

- Vincent Wong — Legal Mavericks
- Bosco Wong — Two Steps From Heaven
- Roger Kwok — Dead Wrong
- Kenneth Ma — My Dearly Sinful Mind
- Ruco Chan — The Unholy Alliance
- Frankie Lam — My Unfair Lady
- Roger Kwok — Dead Wrong
- Edwin Siu — A General, A Scholar And A Eunuch
- Gallen Lo — Provocateur
- Ben Wong — Nothing Special Force
- Eddie Cheung — The No No Girl
- Tony Hung — Married But Available
- Moses Chan — My Lover From The Planet Meow
- Chris Lai — The Tofu War
- Pakho Chau — Line Walker: The Prelude
- Benjamin Yuen — Line Walker: The Prelude
- Wayne Lai — No Reserve
- Kevin Cheng — Destination Nowhere
- Michael Miu — Line Walker: The Prelude
- Matthew Ho — A General, A Scholar And A Eunuch
- Raymond Cho — A General, a Scholar and a Eunuch

Favourite TVB Supporting Actress

- Jacqueline Wong — Provocateur
- Elaine Yiu — The Unholy Alliance
- Samantha Ko — My Unfair Lady
- Katy Kung — Two Steps From Heaven
- Rebecca Zhu — A General, A Scholar And A Eunuch
- Koni Lui — Tiger Mom Blues
- Alice Chan — Two Steps From Heaven
- Kelly Fu — Burning Hands
- Vivien Yeow — My Lover From The Planet Meow
- Tracy Chu — Legal Mavericks
- Roxanne Tong — The Tofu War
- Jeannie Chan — The No No Girl

My Favourite TVB Supporting Actor

- Owen Cheung — Legal Mavericks
- Mat Yeung — My Dearly Sinful Mind
- Hugo Ng — Burning Hands
- Jonathan Cheung — The Tofu War
- 6Wing — Two Steps From Heaven
- Joel Chan — The Unholy Alliance
- Eddie Kwan — My Lover From The Planet Meow
- Kenny Wong — Dead Wrong
- James Ng — Destination Nowhere
- Benz Hui — Line Walker: The Prelude

My Favourite TVB Female TV Characters

- Jessica Hsuan as Ling Man — My Unfair Lady
- Natalie Tong as Ling Yu-Ken — My Unfair Lady
- Nancy Wu as Yuen Ching-Yan — The Unholy Alliance
- Sisley Choi as Chiu Ching-Mui — Legal Mavericks
- Kristal Tin as Fong Wai-Chi — A General, A Scholar And A Eunuch
- Tracy Chu as Tai Tin-Yan — Legal Mavericks
- Mandy Wong as Lung Lai-Sa — Nothing Special Force
- Elaine Yiu as Wai Yee-Yau, Kate — The Unholy Alliance
- Priscilla Wong as Koo Shing-Sheung — Two Steps From Heaven
- Rosina Lam as Ho China-Fa — Burning Hands
- Elena Kong as Cha Heung-Sin — Tiger Mom Blues
- Ali Lee as Wong Lai-Fan — Legal Mavericks
- Grace Wong as Guo Qian/Wong Yi-San — A General, A Scholar And A Eunuch
- Samantha Ko as Tian Mi — My Unfair Lady
- Adia Chan as Law Lai-Ching — The No No Girl
- Charmaine Sheh as Sze Siu-Tung — Bet Hur
- Alice Chan as Koo Shing-Fun — Two Steps From Heaven
- Katy Kung as Ching Sze Yue, Carmen — Two Steps From Heaven
- Moon Lau as Yip Yip, Emma — Two Steps From Heaven
- Rebecca Zhu as Fong Wai-Ling — A General, A Scholar And A Eunuch

My Favourite TVB Male TV Characters

- Ruco Chan as Ko Tsz-Kit — The Unholy Alliance
- Raymond Cho as Zuo Guangdou/ Fung Yat-Bo — A General, A Scholar And A Eunuch
- Bosco Wong as Chun Sing-Hoi — Two Steps From Heaven
- Edwin Siu as Yuan Chonghuan/ Wan Tai-Kwan — A General, A Scholar And A Eunuch
- Frankie Lam as Man Nim-Sum — My Unfair Lady
- Benjamin Yuen as Chui Tin-Tong — Line Walker: The Prelude
- Pakho Chau as Lok Siu-Fung — Line Walker: The Prelude
- Michael Miu as Cheuk Hoi — Line Walker: The Prelude
- Moses Chan as Sit Ding-Kap — My Lover From The Planet Meow
- Vincent Wong as Man Sun-Hop — Legal Mavericks
- Kenneth Ma as Chung Tai-Yin — My Dearly Sinful Mind
- Wayne Lai as Kong Sheung-Hung/Kazuo Suzuki — No Reserve
- Tony Hung as Au Yeung Tsz-Chung — Married But Available
- Mat Yeung as Tung Yat — My Dearly Sinful Mind
- Owen Cheung as Kuk Yat-Ha — Legal Mavericks
- Raymond Wong as Cheung Chin-Pok — Married But Available
- Eddie Cheung as Chong Fu-Ho — The No No Girl
- Joel Chan as Ling Tsin-Yau — The Unholy Alliance
- Chris Lai as Wong Siu-Ming — The Tofu War
- Wong Cho Lam as Choi Sum — Oh My Grad
- Matthew Ho as Li Jinzhong/Li Siu-Tung — A General, A Scholar And A Eunuch
- Roger Kwok as Wai Yat-Sing — Dead Wrong

My Favourite TVB Variety Programme

- Wellness On The Go Singapore
- Lady First Singapore Season 5
- Chef Minor In Singapore
- The Ahistoric Grandpa Cooking Show (Sr.2)
- Spirits On Vacation
- Peak To Pit
- 50 Golden Classics
- Good Cheap Eats (Sr.6)
- All Work No Pay Holidays (Sr.2)
- Side Walk Scientists (Sr.5)
- TV Awards Presentation 2016
- Dinner Ma's

My Favourite TVB Infotainment Programme

- Big World III
- Retiring In Paradise
- Easy Come, Easy Health
- Belt And Road Initiative
- Cantoxicating!

My Favourite TVB Variety Show Host

- Pauline Lan — Lady First Singapore Season 5
- Alice Chan — Wai Gor's Wok
- Tony Hung — Retiring In Paradise
- Kenny Wong, Brian Tse, Chris Leung, Mayanne Mak, Alycia Chan, Ashley Chu — Peak To Pit
- Benjamin Yuen, Mat Yeung — All Work No Pay Holidays (Sr.2)
- Lee Ka Ding, Helen Tam — The Ahistoric Grandpa Cooking Show (Sr.2)
- Samantha Ko, Auston Lam — Chef Minor In Singapore
- Maria Cordero, Luk Ho Ming — Good Cheap Eats (Sr.6)
- Gigi Wong — Eating Well With Madam Wong (Sr.3)
- King Kong, Kitty Yuen, Jarvis Chow — Neighborhood Gourmet (Sr.4)

My Favourite TVB On-Screen Couple

- Tony Hung and Priscilla Wong — Married But Available
- Frankie Lam and Jessica Hsuan — My Unfair Lady
- Vincent Wong and Natalie Tong — My Unfair Lady
- Ruco Chan and Nancy Wu — The Unholy Alliance
- Ruco Chan and Rosina Lam — Burning Hands
- Edwin Siu and Priscilla Wong — Two Steps From Heaven
- Joel Chan and Elaine Yiu — The Unholy Alliance
- Eddie Cheung and Adia Chan — The No No Girl
- Kenneth Ma and Charmaine Sheh — Bet Hur
- Vincent Wong and Ali Lee — Legal Mavericks
- Raymond Wong and Grace Wong — A General, A Scholar And A Eunuch
- Matthew Ho and Rebecca Zhu — A General, A Scholar And A Eunuch

My Favourite TVB Drama Theme Song

- "Sand in Hand" by Hanna Kuk (for My Unfair Lady)
- "I Would Not Pout" by Stephanie Ho (for My Unfair Lady)
- "Walk With You" by Kayee Tam (for My Unfair Lady)
- "King" by Hubert Wu (for Two Steps From Heaven)
- "That's The Way I Am" by Nancy Wu (for The No No Girl)
- "Insight" by Vincent Wong (for Legal Mavericks)
- "In Front Of Love" by Stephanie Ho (for Legal Mavericks)
- "The End Of The World" by Fred Cheng (for Provocateur)
- "Trigger On" by Ruco Chan (for The Unholy Alliance)
- "Alone" by Gallen Lo (for Provocateur)
- "Conquer" by Fred Cheng (for A General, A Scholar And A Eunuch)
- "Skynet" by Pakho Chau (for Line Walker: The Prelude)
- "Forget Myself" by Hanna Kuk (for Line Walker: The Prelude)
- "Behave Onself" by Vivian Koo (for Line Walker: The Prelude)
- "After Graduation" by Mag Lam (for Oh My Grad)

Most Improved TVB Artiste

- Matthew Ho
- Samantha Ko

Best New TVB Artiste

- Brian Tse
- Roxanne Tong

== See also ==
- List of Asian television awards
