= Xie Dongmin =

Xie Dongmin may refer to:

- Hsieh Tung-min (1908–2001), or Xie Dongmin, Taiwanese politician
- Tse Tung-man (born 1985), or Xie Dongmin, Hong Kong singer and actor
