= Rogue Emperor =

Hong Kong television series

- Official poster
- Also known as: The Misadventure of Zoo 2015
- 流氓皇帝
- Genre: Pre-modern Drama, Comedy, Romance
- Created by: Hong Kong Television Broadcasts Limited
- Written by: Cheng Chung Tai, Cheung Suet Guk, Au Yin Yuan, Wong Sau Ching, Wan Kam Fung
- Directed by: Lam Chi Yan, Chin Wing- Chi
- Starring: Kenneth Ma; Niki Chow; Mandy Wong; Benjamin Yuen; Koo Ming Wah; Brian Tse
- Theme music composer: Damon Chui
- Opening theme: Wander (四方) by Hoffman Cheng
- Ending theme: Love from Heart (心暖) by Kenneth Ma & Niki Chow
- Country of origin: Hong Kong
- Original language: Cantonese
- No. of episodes: 17(Hong Kong); 20 (Overseas)

Production
- Executive producer: Catherine Tsang
- Producer: Poon Ka Tak
- Production location: Hong Kong
- Editor: Chan Kam Ling
- Camera setup: Multi camera
- Running time: 45 minutes
- Production company: TVB

Original release
- Network: TVB Jade
- Release: 12 December 2016 – 1 January 2017

Rogue Emperor
- Chinese: 流氓皇帝
- Cantonese Yale: Làuhmàhn Wòhngdai
- Literal meaning: "Rogue Emperor"
Transcriptions
Standard Mandarin
- Hanyu Pinyin: Liúmáng Huángdì
- Bopomofo: ㄌㄧㄡˊ ㄇㄤˊ ㄏㄨㄤˊ ㄉㄧˋ
- IPA: [ljǒu.mǎŋ xwǎŋ.tî]
Yue: Cantonese
- Yale Romanization: Làuhmàhn Wòhngdai
- Jyutping: Lau4man4 Wong4dai3
- IPA: [lɐ̭u.mɐ̭n wɔ̭ːŋ.tɐ̄i]

Rogue Emperor (Chinese: 流氓皇帝; literally "Rogue Emperor") is a 2016 Hong Kong pre-modern romantic-comedy television drama created and produced by TVB, starring Kenneth Ma, Niki Chow, Mandy Wong, Benjamin Yuen, Koo Ming Wah and Brian Tse as the main cast. Filming took place from April till June 2014. The drama was originally scheduled to broadcast after "Master of Destiny" on Hong Kong's TVB Jade and HD Jade channels on August 3, 2015, every Monday through Friday during its 8:30-9:30 pm timeslot with a total of 20 episodes. On July 8, 2015, the drama was shelved again with no scheduled date of when it will be broadcast. In November 2016, it was announced that the drama will finally have an air date of 12 December 2016, with the number of episodes decreasing to 17.

Rogue Emperor is a remake of TVB's 1981 drama The Misadventure of Zoo, which starred Adam Cheng and Louise Lee as the leads.

== Synopsis ==
Poor village boy Chu Gam Chun (Kenneth Ma), lives with his step-mother Yau Yue Si (Rainbow Ching), the village matchmaker and half-brother Chu Cheung Fun (Benjamin Yuen), a woodcutter that is jinxed with finding love. Gam Chun has been in-love with his childhood friend and next-door neighbor Yi Yung Yung (Niki Chow) since they were young, but her grandfather Yi Sang Kei (Joseph Lee), a well-to-do merchant that owns the village pawn shop forbids them from associating with each other. When Gam Chun finds out his step-mother has match-made Yung Yung with an older rich villager, he sabotages it and then asks Yung Yung's grandfather for permission to marry her. Yung Yung's grandfather is highly against Gam Chun's proposal and demands a high dowry if he wants to marry Yung Yung. Determined to marry Yung Yung, Gam Chun takes on many odd jobs in order to earn the needed dowry money. His many odd jobs soon leads him on many adventures, from becoming the leader of mountain bandits to the Emperor of China.

== Cast ==
=== Chu family ===
- Rainbow Ching as Yau Yu Sze (尤如絲; homophone to "shredded squid")

Chu Kam Chun's step-mother and Chu Cheung Fun's mother. She favors her biological son Cheung Fun more than Kam Chun, such as giving Cheung Fun more food during meals. Yu Sze is the villager matchmaker, who for a large sum payment will do despicable acts to break up a promised marriage agreement.

- Kenneth Ma as Chu Kam Chun (朱錦春; homophone to "stupid as a pig")

Yau Yue Si's step-son and Chu Cheung Fu's older half-brother. He has been in-love with Yung Yung since they were children because she always treated him kindly, however her grandfather has been against their friendship and association because he is poor. In order to marry Yung Yung, Kam Chun takes on many odd jobs which leads him on different adventures.

- Benjamin Yuen as Chu Cheung Fun (朱祥勛; homophone to "rice noodle roll")

Yau Yu Sze's son and Chu Kam Chun's younger half-brother. With his handsome looks and physique, Cheung Fun is the most eligible woodcutter bachelor in the village and he has many female admirers. However, because he is jinxed from love, every female that becomes or tries to become romantic with him dies, and so none of the females in the village want to go near him.

=== Yik family and household ===
- Joseph Lee as Yik Suk Kung (易叔恭)

Yik Yung Yung's grandfather and the Chu's next door neighbour. He is a well-to-do local pawn shop owner who swindles the villagers that pawn their goods at his shop. He is also highly against Kam Chun's friendship with Yung Yung because Kam Chun is poor. He is so highly against the two associating with each other that he built a brick wall between their shared yard.

- Niki Chow as Yik Yung Yung (易蓉蓉)

Yik Suk Kung's granddaughter and Kam Chun's neighbor, childhood friend and love interest. Yung Yung was the only person who has always been extra kind to Kam Chun, which is why he is so in love with her. When her grandfather sets her up on a matchmaking marriage, Kam Chun purposes marriage to her but is denied by her grandfather——unless he is able to provide his requested dowry amount.

- Snow Suen as Siu Wan (小環). She works for the Yik family and has a crush on Yik Suk Kung, hoping he would marry her into the family.

=== Ng family ===
- Jerry Ku as Ng Dor Ho (吳多好; homophone to "no good"), a somewhat educated man who takes care of the village temple. He is in the process of earning money to buy back his sister Ng Dor Yu's "body contract" from the Tung family so that she can be free.
- Mandy Wong as Ng Dor Yu (吳多茹, homophone to "not redundant"), the shy and demure younger sister of Ng Dor Ho. She is sold to the Tung family to works as a maid. Her love interest is Tung Chan Pong.

=== Extended cast ===
- Brian Tse as Ngau Yuk Kon (牛玉乾; homophone to "beef jerky"), a physician and close friend of Kam Chun. His love interest is Ng Dor-yu.
- Luk Wing Kuen as Tung Chan Pong (董振邦). He comes back after receiving education from abroad and is a forward-thinking individual. He joins an underground organization in hopes of bringing change and is ranked 99, later promoted to 98.
- Harriet Yeung as Lung Chuen Fung (龍川鳯), the head of the mountain bandits.
- Joe Tay as Ngau Lik (牛力), friend of Chu Kam Chun. He becomes the "lord of Shanghai" and was set to marry Yung Yung, but is later murdered by Che Tai Pau.
- Pal Sinn as Che Tai Pau (車大炮, Cantonese slang for "telling lies").
- Lau Kong as Ngau Pak Yip (牛栢葉), father of Ngau Yuk Kon. He is an experienced physician.
- Henry Lo as Tung Kui Yan (董舉仁). He is the village mayor and father of Tung Chan Pong.
- Kirby Lam as Lung Lei (龍梨). The third-in-command of the mountain bandits.
- Kimmi Tsui as Lung So (龍蘇). The second-in-command of the mountain bandits.
- Alan Tam Kwan-lun as Ying Sing Chung (應聲叢, homophone to "bug that always answers back"), one of Che Tai Pau's men.
- Adam Ip as Shue Ming Ho (舒明浩, homophone to guillement). He is ranked 98 in the underground organization, and is later promoted to number 89.
- Aaryn Cheung as Fat Zai (發仔)
- Hinson Chou as Shanghai singer (上海歌星)
- Kelvin Yuen as Bo (寶)
- Quinn Ho as Biu (標)
- Lily Ho as Siu Yuk (小玉), Chu Cheung Fun's lover. They later break up as he failed to save her when she nearly died from drowning.
- Tracy Chu as Fung Siu Yung (馮小融), a volunteer who tries to help Chu Kam Chun move into a senior home.

== Soundtrack ==
Track listing

No.	Title	Lyrics	Music	Singer(s)	Length
1.	"Wander" (四方)	Hayes Yeung	Damon Chui	Hoffman Cheng	3:00
2.	"Heart Warm" (心暖)	Hayes Yeung	Damon Chui	Kenneth Ma & Niki Chow	2:53
3.	"Cheers" (乾杯)	Hayes Yeung	Damon Chui	Ronald Law, Hoffman Cheng & Yao Bin	2:58

== Development ==
TVB 2015 calendar, March image. From left to right: Benjamin Yuen, Kenneth Ma, Mandy Wong, Brian Tse.

- Tavia Yeung was considered for the lead actress role by executive producer Catherine Tsang during early development of the drama.
- Niki Chow was confirmed as the lead actress during the costume fitting ceremony held in March 2014.
- The costume fitting ceremony was held on March 27, 2014, at 12:30 pm Tseung Kwan O TVB City Studio One.
- The blessing and opening lens ceremony was held on April 15, 2014, at 12:30 pm Tseung Kwan O TVB City Ancient Street.
- Filming of the drama took place from April till June 2014.
- On June 26, 2014, a banquet was held at a restaurant in Tsim Sha Tsui to celebrate the completion of the filming of the drama.
- A promo image of Rogue Emperor was featured in TVB's 2015 calendar for the month of March. Female lead Niki Chow was not featured on the image since she is not a contractual TVB artiste.
- In early July 2015, Kenneth Ma and Niki Chow resumed their characters from the drama to film promotional clips when it was announced the drama would begin broadcast on August 3, 2015. On July 8, 2015, TVB shelved the drama to be air at a later unscheduled date in order to accommodate earlier broadcast of The Fixer (拆局專家) on August 10, 2015, 9:30 pm timeslot. With The Fixer taking over the 9:30 timeslot, Brick Slaves was then moved to the 8:30 timeslot, taking over Rogue Emperor's original broadcast position. The drama is now set to air from 12 December 2016, with 17 episodes.

== Viewership Ratings ==
#	Timeslot (HKT)	Week	Episode(s)	Average points	Peaking points
1	Mon – Fri (8:30-9:30 pm); 20:30–21:30	12 – 16 Dec 2016	1 — 5	22	28
2	Mon – Fri (8:30-9:30 pm); 20:30–21:30	19 – 23 Dec 2016	6 — 10	22	--
3	Mon – Fri (8:30-9:30 pm); 20:30–21:30	26 – 30 Dec 2016	11 — 15	19	--
4	Mon – Fri (8:30-9:30 pm); 20:30–21:30	01 Jan 2017	16 & 17	20	--
Total average				21	28

== Awards and nominations ==
Association	Category	Nominee	Result
StarHub TVB Awards	My Favourite TVB Actress	Niki Chow	Nominated
TVB Star Awards Malaysia	My Favourite TVB Drama Series		Nominated
TVB Star Awards Malaysia	My Favourite TVB Actress in a Leading Role	Niki Chow	Nominated
TVB Star Awards Malaysia	My Favourite TVB Most Improved Actor	Brian Tse	Nominated
TVB Anniversary Awards	Best Drama		Nominated
TVB Anniversary Awards	Most Popular Drama Theme Song	"四方" (Four Sides) by Hoffman Cheng	Nominated
TVB Anniversary Awards	Most Popular Drama Theme Song	"心暖" (Love from Heart) by Kenneth Ma and Nikki Chow	Nominated
TVB Anniversary Awards	Most Popular Drama Theme Song	"乾杯" (Cheers) by Hoffman Cheng, Ronald Law, and Yao Bin	Nominated
