= Erin Wong =

Erin Wong Cheuk-kay
- 王卓淇
- Born: Yuexiu, Guangzhou, Guangdong, Mainland China
- Education: Guangdong University of Foreign Studies; UWE Bristol

Erin Wong Cheuk-kay (Chinese: 王卓淇) is a Hong Kong actress and singer, once active in the Hong Kong entertainment industry, runner-up of the 2014 Miss Hong Kong Pageant.

== Early life ==
Wong was born in Guangzhou. Her father is a skin care product manufacturer. Her family has a lot of property investments overseas. She is said to be one of the rich young actresses of TVB.

== Career ==
In 2011, Wong participated in the Miss Chinese Universe contest and was shortlisted for the top 18. In 2014, she won the runner-up in the 2014 Miss Hong Kong Pageant, she represented Hong Kong in the Miss World competition held in London. In January 2015, Wong enrolled in the Anthony Wong × Olivia Yan master class, and at the end of 2016, she enrolled in the 3-month Performing Arts Advanced Training Class. In 2017, she received attention for her first time playing two roles, "Fan Tai-hei" and "Choi Siu-yau" in the TVB drama "The No No Girl".
