= Mikhail Evstafiev =

Russian painter, photographer, and writer

- Михаил Евстафьев
- Born: 12 January 1963 (age 63); Moscow, Russian SFSR, Soviet Union
- Known for: Painter; writer; photojournalist
- Movement: Expressionism

Mikhail Aleksandrovich Evstafiev (Russian: Михаил Александрович Евстафьев; born 12 January 1963) is a Russian artist, photographer, and writer.

His interest in painting and photography began at an early age. His mother, grandmother and great-grandfather – all prominent Russian sculptors – inspired him to develop his own style in art. His work is listed in "Allgemeines Künstlerlexikon" (The World Biographical Dictionary of Artists).

In the late 1980s, he volunteered to serve in Afghanistan and spent two years in the Soviet army, stationed in Kabul, witnessing the numerous combat operations and the 1989 withdrawal of Soviet troops. He later published the novel Two Steps From Heaven about the Soviet invasion of Afghanistan.

Working for leading international news organizations in the 1990s, he also covered the wars and armed conflicts in Bosnia and Herzegovina, Chechnya, Georgia, Nagorno-Karabakh, Tajikistan and Transdniestria, as well as the Soviet coup attempt of 1991 and the Russian constitutional crisis of 1993.

Mikhail Evstafiev's paintings and photographs have been exhibited in different countries, including Austria, China, Russia and the United States, in places such as the Hofburg Congress Centre, the State Kremlin Palace, the Maly Manezh Exhibition Hall and the Central House of Artists in Moscow, and in the Grand Central Terminal in New York City.

His paintings and photographs are in the collections of the Moscow House of Photography and SOLMS, Gallery der Leica Camera AG, and in private collections in Andorra, Austria, Britain, France, Poland, Russia and the United States. His work appeared in leading international magazines and newspapers and was published in numerous books.

== See also ==
- List of Russian artists
