= Two Steps from Heaven =

1997 novel by Mikhail Evstafiev

Two Steps From Heaven
- Author: Mikhail Evstafiev
- Language: Russian
- Publisher: Eksmo
- Publication date: 1997, 2006
- Publication place: Russia
- Media type: Print (Hardback & Paperback)

See also an album by Two Steps from Hell

Two Steps From Heaven is a novel by Russian author Mikhail Evstafiev.

== Plot summary ==
The events of the novel take place in the mid-1980s during the Soviet invasion of Afghanistan and soon after the troop withdrawal, back in the then Soviet Union. It is a stirring account of the trials of Lieutenant Oleg Sharagin, a platoon commander in the elite Soviet airborne forces, his fellow officers and soldiers. It also portrays the ordinary Afghans who suffered enormously under the Soviet occupation.

Sharagin survives many combat operations but is critically wounded just a few months before the end of his tour of duty when his platoon is ambushed in the course of a major offensive against the Mujahideen. He is evacuated to a hospital in Kabul, undergoes surgery, and finally finds himself reunited with his family. But back home he realizes his military career is over. The war haunts Sharagin and the pain caused by the wound turns his life into a nightmare, leading to a dramatic finale.

The novel is a good example of Russian "accurate fiction." It puts a human face on the Soviet soldier without sparing the gory details, like the hard to comprehend top-down authority and license for physical punishment and humiliation within the Russian army, the mental suffering which young soldiers and officers endured during their catastrophic experience in Afghanistan, or the gruesome killings of innocent Afghan civilians.

The novel first came out in Russian in 1997 in an abridged version. In 2006, it was published by Eksmo, one of the largest publishing houses in Russia.

The Russian and English versions can also be found on "Art of War", a project dedicated to the soldiers of the recent wars, which was created in 1998 by a Russian veteran of the Afghan war, Vladimir Grigoriev. It features short stories, novels, poetry and essays by veterans of the wars in Afghanistan and Chechnya, as well as in the Middle East, Nagorno-Karabakh, Yugoslavia and contributions from veterans of the Vietnam and Korea wars.
