= Burning Hands =

Hong Kong television series

- Official poster
- 乘勝狙擊
- Genre: Drama; Crime; Suspense
- Created by: Yip Chan-fai
- Written by: Lau Chi-wah
- Directed by: Yip Chan-fai
- Starring: Ruco Chan; Rosina Lam; Joel Chan; Kelly Fu; Pal Sinn; Rebecca Chan
- Theme music composer: Damon Chui
- Opening theme: "Strike" music by Damon Chui
- Ending theme: "Love Story Background Music" by Hou Yean Cha
- Country of origin: Hong Kong
- Original language: Cantonese
- No. of episodes: 28

Production
- Producer: Yip Chan-fai
- Production locations: Hong Kong; Macau
- Production company: TVB

Original release
- Network: Jade
- Release: 16 January – 12 February 2017

Burning Hands
- Traditional Chinese: 乘勝狙擊
- Simplified Chinese: 乘胜狙击
- Cantonese Yale: Sìngsing Jēuigīk
- Literal meaning: "take advantage of the victory (and) strike"
Transcriptions
Standard Mandarin
- Hanyu Pinyin: Chéngshèng Jūjī
- Bopomofo: ㄔㄥˊㄕㄥˋㄐㄩ ㄐㄧ
Yue: Cantonese
- Yale Romanization: Sìngsing Jēuigīk
- Jyutping: Sing4sing3 Zeoi1gik1
- IPA: [sḙːŋ.sēːŋ tsɵ́y.kék̚]

Burning Hands (Chinese: 乘勝狙擊; Cantonese Yale: Sìngsing Jēuigīk) is a Hong Kong crime television drama produced by Yip Chan-fai and TVB. The plot follows a team of con artists and illusionists, who are hired by a casino tycoon to find the mastermind behind his casino's embezzled funds. But the leader of the gang, Chak Koon-yat (Ruco Chan), has his own reasons for helping the mogul.

Burning Hands began principal photography in March 2016, which lasted until July 2016. It premiered on 16 January 2017.

== Synopsis ==
"Yat Gor" Chak Koon-yat, "Win Jeh" Ho Ching-fa, and "Yee Jai" Hugo Ng have followed their master Szeto Sing to learn con tricks and illusions since childhood. Yat and Fa grow fond of each other over the years, but a competition estranges them and they lose contact. In order to flush out the mole, a casino tycoon named Fok Chun-sing colludes with Szeto to induce Yat and Hugo into taking up a secret mission, resulting in their reunion with Fa. With each of them possessing a unique talent, they gradually uncover that the mole might be Fok's right-hand man Lam Lui, confidant Yau Yuet-wah, or one of their rivals.

But nothing is as it seems. To come into terms to why Fok killed his father Cheung Tin-lung twenty years ago, Yat infiltrates the Chun Sing Group, dealing a crushing blow to the crisis-ridden casino. That leads to an enmity between siblings, total severance of the master-disciple relationship, and irreconcilable differences between father and son.

== Cast and characters ==
=== Con artists ===
- Ruco Chan as Yat Gor (一哥; "Brother One") / Chak Koon-yat (翟冠一; Zaak Gunjat): the main protagonist, an insightful sleight of hand illusionist, and the leader of the team. Cheung Tin-lung's biological son. He initially gets close to Chun-sing in order to avenge his father. Yat later finds out that his father did not die, and that his father was the one who first attempted to kill Fok.
- Rosina Lam as Win Jeh (Win姐; "Sister Win") / Ho Ching-fa (何正花; Ho Zingfaa): a mahjong swindler and Yat Gor's love interest.
- Joel Chan as Yee Jai (義仔) / Hugo Ng (伍柏義; Ng Paakji): a main villain, a street magician, and Yat's childhood friend.
- Candice Chiu as Souvenir / Sophia So (蘇麗芬; So Laifan): an impersonator.
- Lam Tsz-sin as Sun Kai Jai (新界仔; "NT Kid") / Ting Kuen (丁權; Ding Kyun): a skilled MMA fighter.
- Tsui Wing as Open Eyes / Lee Hang (李亨; Lei Hang): an amateur racer, acting as the driver for the team.
- Stefan Wong as Sau Fung (收峰; "Get Wind") / Ng Sai-fung (吳世峰; Ng Saifung): the team's greaseman, in charge of collecting intel. He can lip-read and also works as a bartender.
- Pat Poon as Szeto Sing (司徒省; Sitou Sing): a seasoned gambler and a con-man. He leads a team of con-artists to help his friend, Fok Chun-sing, investigate an embezzlement case.

=== Extended main cast members ===
- Pal Sinn as Fok Chun-sing (霍駿昇; Fok Zeonsing): an influential casino mogul known as the "Gambling King." He hires Szeto's con artist crew to help him find the mastermind behind the embezzled funds from his casino.
- Kelly Fu as Dawn Fok (霍曦昕; Fok Heijan) Fok's daughter. She is also Yee's girlfriend.
- Rebecca Chan as Celine Yau Yuet-wah (丘月華; Jau Jyunwaa): Fok's lover and confidant. Cheung Tin-lung's wife. Fok's ex-girlfriend and real loved one.
- Jacquelin Ch'ng as Veronica Ha (夏美詩; Haa Meisi): a news reporter, and Hugo's love interest.
- Hugo Wong as Chow Siu-leung (周兆良; Zau Siuloeng): a main villain, a police officer who starts investigating Szeto's con-artist crew.
- Geoffrey Wong as Lam Lui (林磊; Lam Leoi): a villain, Fok's right-hand man. The one behind Fok and Tin-lung's conflict.

=== Recurring cast members ===
- Rosanne Lui (阮柔紫) as Koon-yat's mother
- Alex Tse (謝可逸) as Ho Ka-Chung, Ho Ching-fa’s younger brother
- Hugo Ng as Cheung Tin-lung, Koon-yat's father, former partner of Chun-sing but murdered by him in Philippines 20 years ago. He survives the murder attempt but suffers memory loss for 20 years. After he regains his memory, he returns to take revenge on Fok.
- Lena Wong
- Otto Chan
- Joe Junior
- Nicole Leung (梁麗翹) as Zita, the "Gambling King"'s secretary.

== Awards and nominations ==
Association	Category	Nominee	Result
StarHub TVB Awards	My Favourite TVB Drama	Lau Chi-wah	Nominated
StarHub TVB Awards	My Favourite TVB Actress	Rosina Lam	Nominated
StarHub TVB Awards	My Favourite TVB Supporting Actress	Kelly Fu	Nominated
StarHub TVB Awards	My Favourite TVB Supporting Actor	Hugo Ng	Nominated
StarHub TVB Awards	My Favourite TVB Female TV Characters	Rosina Lam	Nominated
StarHub TVB Awards	My Favourite TVB On-Screen Couple	Ruco Chan and Rosina Lam	Nominated
TVB Star Awards Malaysia	My Favourite TVB Drama Series	Lau Chi-wah	Nominated
TVB Star Awards Malaysia	My Favourite TVB Actress in a Leading Role	Rosina Lam	Nominated
TVB Star Awards Malaysia	My Favourite TVB Drama Characters	Rosina Lam	Nominated
TVB Star Awards Malaysia	My Favourite TVB Drama Characters	Kelly Fu	Nominated
TVB Anniversary Awards	Best Drama	Lau Chi-wah	Nominated
TVB Anniversary Awards	Best Actress	Rosina Lam	Nominated
TVB Anniversary Awards	Best Supporting Actor	Hugo Ng	Nominated

== Development ==
- The costume fitting ceremony was held together on March 21, 2016 at 12:30 pm Tseung Kwan O TVB City Studio One Common Room.
- Elaine Yiu was originally cast as Dawn Fok. Due to an incident where her dog scratched her face, she had to turn down the role and was replaced by Kelly Fu.
- Kenneth Ma was originally cast in the role, Yee Jai, but dropped out due to schedule conflicts and was replaced by Joel Chan.
