= My Unfair Lady =

- Also known as: 不懂撒嬌的女人
- Genre: City, Business and Financial, Sitcom
- Created by: Hong Kong Television Broadcasts Limited
- Starring: Frankie Lam; Jessica Hsuan; Vincent Wong; Natalie Tong; Lai Lok-Yi; Samantha Ko; Max Cheung; Zoie Tam
- Opening theme: I Don't Know How to Act Cute (我不會撒嬌) by Stephanie Ho for episodes 1-14 as an opening song, it is a ending song for episodes 15-27
- Ending theme: Sands in Hand (手中沙) by Hana Kuk vice versa
- Country of origin: Hong Kong
- Original languages: Cantonese; Mandarin; English; Malay
- No. of episodes: 28

Production
- Running time: 45 minutes
- Production company: TVB

My Unfair Lady (Chinese: 不懂撒嬌的女人) is TVB's first 4K resolution television series. It stars Frankie Lam, Jessica Hsuan, Vincent Wong and Natalie Tong as the main leads, with Lai Lok-Yi, Samantha Ko, Max Cheung and Zoie Tam as the major supporting cast. It aired concurrently on TVB Jade, Hub Drama First, Astro On Demand, Astro GO and MyTV SUPER.

This drama marks the return of Frankie Lam and Jessica Hsuan to TVB.

== Synopsis ==
Successful property manager Molly Ling has a golden touch. The shopping malls under her management have won countless awards. She is also a super control freak. As her number one assistant, her cousin Cherry Ling is totally under her control and works hard for Molly. She learns to flirt superficially, helping Molly smooth over many problems. Just as Molly is looking forward to moving up the company to be appointed to the board of directors, the company brings in Gordon Man, a marketing visionary, to be her equal. Thus begins the power struggle fueled by hatred and ego between the ex-couple. Meanwhile, Cherry discovers that her boyfriend Hanson Ho has cheated on her. In her time of disappointment, she encounters a deeply compassionate gentleman, Saving Ching. But just when she believes their relationship will blossom into love, Cherry finds out that Saving is abnormally afraid of marriage. Can the two cousins, both competent women, but unable to flirt, ultimately reverse their misfortune and find happiness?

== Cast ==
=== Main cast ===
- Frankie Lam as Gordon Man Nim-sum 文念深
  - Hoi Yeung as young Gordon
- Jessica Hsuan as Molly Ling Man 凌敏 (Mall姐)
  - Kaman Kong as young Molly
- Vincent Wong as Saving Ching Yat-fai 程日暉
- Natalie Tong as Cherry Ling Yu-kan 凌禹勤 (勤力妹)
  - Sophia Lam as young Cherry

=== Supporting cast ===
- Lai Lok-Yi as Hanson Ho Chi-chiu 何志超 (賤Han)
- Samantha Ko as Tin Mut 田蜜
- Max Cheung as Oscar Yeung Kam-tat 楊金達
- Zoie Tam as Annie Chan Hoi-Ching 陳凱澄

== Awards and nominations ==
Association	Category	Nominee	Result
StarHub TVB Awards	My Favourite TVB Drama	—N/a	Nominated
StarHub TVB Awards	My Favourite TVB Actress	Jessica Hsuan	Nominated
StarHub TVB Awards	My Favourite TVB Actress	Natalie Tong	Nominated
StarHub TVB Awards	My Favourite TVB Actor	Frankie Lam	Nominated
StarHub TVB Awards	My Favourite TVB Supporting Actress	Samantha Ko	Nominated
StarHub TVB Awards	My Favourite TVB Female TV Characters	Jessica Hsuan	Won
StarHub TVB Awards	My Favourite TVB Female TV Characters	Natalie Tong	Won
StarHub TVB Awards	My Favourite TVB Female TV Characters	Samantha Ko	Nominated
StarHub TVB Awards	My Favourite TVB Male TV Characters	Frankie Lam	Nominated
StarHub TVB Awards	My Favourite TVB On-Screen Couple	Frankie Lam and Jessica Hsuan	Nominated
StarHub TVB Awards	My Favourite TVB On-Screen Couple	Vincent Wong and Natalie Tong	Won
StarHub TVB Awards	My Favourite TVB Drama Theme Song	"Sand in Hand" by Hanna Kuk	Nominated
StarHub TVB Awards	My Favourite TVB Drama Theme Song	"I Would Not Pout" by Stephanie Ho	Nominated
StarHub TVB Awards	My Favourite TVB Drama Theme Song	"Walk With You" by Kayee Tam	Nominated
TVB Star Awards Malaysia	My Favourite TVB Drama Series	—N/a	Nominated
TVB Star Awards Malaysia	My Favourite TVB Actor in a Leading Role	Frankie Lam	Nominated
TVB Star Awards Malaysia	My Favourite TVB Actress in a Leading Role	Jessica Hsuan	Won
TVB Star Awards Malaysia	My Favourite TVB Actress in a Leading Role	Natalie Tong	Nominated (Top 3)
TVB Star Awards Malaysia	My Favourite TVB Actor in a Supporting Role	Andrew Yuen	Nominated
TVB Star Awards Malaysia	My Favourite TVB Actress in a Supporting Role	Samantha Ko	Nominated
TVB Star Awards Malaysia	My Favourite TVB Most Improved Female Artiste	Zoie Tam	Won
TVB Star Awards Malaysia	My Favourite TVB Most Improved Female Artiste	Kaman Kong	Nominated
TVB Star Awards Malaysia	My Favourite TVB On-Screen Couple	Frankie Lam and Jessica Hsuan	Nominated
TVB Star Awards Malaysia	My Favourite TVB On-Screen Couple	Vincent Wong and Natalie Tong	Nominated
TVB Star Awards Malaysia	My Favourite TVB Drama Characters	Frankie Lam	Nominated
TVB Star Awards Malaysia	My Favourite TVB Drama Characters	Jessica Hsuan	Won
TVB Star Awards Malaysia	My Favourite TVB Drama Characters	Natalie Tong	Won
TVB Star Awards Malaysia	My Favourite TVB Drama Characters	Chris Lai	Won
TVB Star Awards Malaysia	My Favourite TVB Drama Characters	Samantha Ko	Won
TVB Star Awards Malaysia	My Favourite TVB Drama Theme Song	Sand in Hands" (手中沙) by Hana Kuk	Won
TVB Star Awards Malaysia	My Favourite TVB Drama Theme Song	Walk with You" (陪着你走) by Kayee Tam	Nominated
TVB Anniversary Awards	Best Drama	—N/a	Nominated
TVB Anniversary Awards	Best Actor	Frankie Lam	Nominated
TVB Anniversary Awards	Best Actress	Jessica Hsuan	Nominated
TVB Anniversary Awards	Best Actress	Natalie Tong	Won
TVB Anniversary Awards	Best Supporting Actor	Max Cheung	Nominated
TVB Anniversary Awards	Best Supporting Actor	Chris Lai	Nominated
TVB Anniversary Awards	Best Supporting Actor	Andrew Yuen	Nominated
TVB Anniversary Awards	Best Supporting Actress	Samantha Ko	Nominated
TVB Anniversary Awards	Best Supporting Actress	Zoie Tam	Nominated
TVB Anniversary Awards	Most Popular Male Character	Frankie Lam	Nominated
TVB Anniversary Awards	Most Popular Male Character	Vincent Wong	Nominated (Top 5)
TVB Anniversary Awards	Most Popular Male Character	Andrew Yuen	Nominated
TVB Anniversary Awards	Most Popular Female Character	Jessica Hsuan	Nominated
TVB Anniversary Awards	Most Popular Female Character	Samantha Ko	Nominated
TVB Anniversary Awards	Most Popular Female Character	Natalie Tong	Nominated (Top 5)
TVB Anniversary Awards	Most Improved Female Artiste	Samantha Ko	Nominated
TVB Anniversary Awards	Most Improved Female Artiste	Zoie Tam	Nominated
TVB Anniversary Awards	Most Popular Drama Theme Song	"我不會撒嬌" (I Don't Know How to Act Cute) by Stephanie Ho	Nominated
TVB Anniversary Awards	Most Popular Drama Theme Song	"手中沙" (Sand in Hands) by Hana Kuk	Nominated
TVB Anniversary Awards	Most Popular Drama Theme Song	"陪著你走" (Walking By Your Side) by Kayee Tam	Nominated
TVB Anniversary Awards	Most Popular On-Screen Partnership	Vincent Wong and Natalie Tong	Nominated (Top 3)

== International broadcast ==
Country	Channel
Brunei	TVB Jade
Malaysia	TVB Jade, 8TV, TV3
Indonesia	RCTI
