= Married but Available =

Hong Kong television show

- 我瞞結婚了
- Genre: Comedy
- Created by: Hong Kong Television Broadcasts Limited
- Starring: Raymond Wong; Priscilla Wong; Tony Hung; Kelly Fu; Alice Chan; Cilla Kung; Emily Wong; Joseph Lee; Amy Fan; KK Cheung; Hugo Ng; Gary Chan
- Opening theme: 真心真意 (With All My Heart) by Stephanie Ho and Fred Cheng
- Ending theme: "印記" (Seal of Love) by KaYee Tam
- Country of origin: Hong Kong
- Original language: Cantonese
- No. of episodes: 20

Production
- Executive producer: Leung Choi-yuen
- Production location: Hong Kong
- Production company: TVB

Married But Available (Chinese: 我瞞結婚了; Cantonese Yale: Ngóh Mùhn Gitfān Líuh) is a fashioned comedy drama serial produced by Television Broadcasts Limited under executive producer Leung Choi-yuen. It focuses on the hidden marriage couples in Hong Kong and even mainland China. Married But Available stars Tony Hung, Raymond Wong, Priscilla Wong, Kelly Fu, Alice Chan and Hugo Ng.

Married But Available is a fashioned Hong Kong slang to describe the hidden marriage couples which is initially known as MBA. It first to be introduced in the Two Steps from Heaven in TVB drama.

The drama first aired on March 13, 2017.

== Plot ==
Tony Au Yeung Tze-chung marries his girlfriend Chu Ming-ming abroad. Once back in Hong Kong, Chu Ming-ming goes back to work at Kam Bo Do (金寶多), a traditional enterprise at the top of the gold and jewellery industry. Chu Ming-ming is promoted by her boss, Carol, to be her personal assistant on the condition that Chu is single, thus, can be called upon at any time. In order to get the high salary job, Chu Ming-ming decides to hide her marriage from her boss. Coincidentally around the same time, Tony is also hired as a personal assistant by his best friend, Lucas Cheung, whom he met while doing his master's degree in America. Tony also decides to hide his marriage from Lucas.

Later Lucas becomes a part of Kam Bo Dor's board members. Tony and Ming-ming then realize that they now work in the same company and Ming-ming's boss is Lucas' ex-stepmother, making Tony and Ming-ming to be on opposing teams within the company. The two bosses constantly power struggle to prove they are the better leader for the company. While serving their respective bosses and with the help of Chu Min-ming's friends, Candy and Shirley, the married couple constantly come up with stories and excuses to keep their marriage a secret from their bosses and other co-workers.

Through his job Tony becomes reacquainted with Kay, Lucas' younger half-sister, who he met years earlier when she was a teenager. Tony had promised Kay that once she learns how to swim he will teach her to dive and show her the colourful world under the sea and find the beautiful mermaid. However, they lose contact and Kay, now an adult, has been hoping to find Tony ever since. Tony and Kay have a romantic relationship as does Ming-ming and Lucas. Will the romantic feelings tear apart friendships and marriage? Will ill feelings carry into the workplace?

Later it is revealed that Lucas is going after a bigger fish than Carol. Lucas enlists Ming-ming to help him with this dangerous mission. Is there really a bigger and more dangerous enemy or is this Lucas' ploy for revenge on all who have wronged him?

== Casting ==
- Raymond Wong as Lucas Cheung (張展博)- hires Tony to be his personal assistant. Becomes a board member of Kam Bo Dor.
- Priscilla Wong as Janet Chu Ming-ming (朱明明)- Carol's personal assistant.
- Tony Hung as Tony Au Yeung (歐陽梓聰)- Lucas' personal assistant.
- Kelly Fu as Kay (紀文意)- stepdaughter of Shui Kor. Met Tony as a teenager. Tony had promised to take her diving to see the beautiful mermaid. Lives in Lei Yue Mun.
- Alice Chan as Carol (施露嘉)- managing director of Kam Bo Dor (金寶多). Has family history with Lucas Cheung resulting in animosity between the two. Hired Chu Ming-ming to be her personal assistant. Known as the black or demon queen to subordinates.
- Cilla Kung as Candy (余可兒)- friend of Chu Ming-ming and Tony. Works at Kam Bo Dor. Helps Chu Ming-ming and Tony keep their marriage a secret from their respective bosses.
- Emily Wong as Shirley (畢莎莉)- friends with Chu Ming-ming and Tony. Works at Kam Bo Dor. Helps keep Chu Ming-ming and Tony's secret from their respective bosses.
- Jacquelin Ch'ng as Mandy (宋菲瑜)- senior secretary who is jealous of Chu Ming-ming for being the personal assistant to Carol.
- C Kwan as Albert (戴堅庭)- schemes with Mandy to make life hard for Chu Ming-ming. Likes to suckup to Carol to show his loyalty. Suspects Tony and Chu Ming-ming's relationship is more complicated than meets the eye but does not have proof.
- Joseph Lee as Shui Kor (水哥)- Kay's stepfather. Owner of seafood restaurant. Has a good relationship with Kay and treats her like his own child. Occasionally insecure about his position with his wife and stepdaughter. Lives in Lei Yue Mun (鯉魚門).
- Amy Fan as Hong hong (香香)- Kay's mother and co-owner of seafood restaurant. Jack's former lover. Lives in Lei Yue Mun.
- Erin Wong as Haw Oi (可愛)- Shui Kor and Hong hong's daughter. Kay's half-sister. Lives in Lei Yue Mun.
- Lee Yee-man as 阿牛- Kay's tomboy friend and assistant on photo shoots. A resident of Lei Yue Mun.
- Hugo Ng as Jack (張建國)- former owner of Kam Bo Dor. He is Lucas' father. Hong hong's former lover.
- KK Cheung as Long Wan (龍 雲)- businessman who invests into Kam Bo Dor and installs Lucas as a board member.
- Jan Tse as Celine Tong- divorced celebrity with 5-year-old son.
- Gary Chan as 朱錦強- Chu Ming-ming's father.

== Awards and nominations ==
Association	Category	Nominee	Result
StarHub TVB Awards	My Favourite TVB Drama		Nominated
StarHub TVB Awards	My Favourite TVB Actor	Tony Hung	Nominated
StarHub TVB Awards	My Favourite TVB Male TV Characters	Tony Hung	Nominated
StarHub TVB Awards	My Favourite TVB Male TV Characters	Raymond Wong	Nominated
StarHub TVB Awards	My Favourite TVB On-Screen Couple	Tony Hung and Priscilla Wong	Nominated
TVB Star Awards Malaysia	My Favourite TVB Drama Series		Nominated
TVB Star Awards Malaysia	My Favourite TVB Actor in a Leading Role	Tony Hung	Nominated
TVB Star Awards Malaysia	My Favourite TVB Actress in a Supporting Role	Alice Chan	Nominated
TVB Anniversary Awards	Best Drama		Nominated
TVB Anniversary Awards	Best Supporting Actress	Kelly Fu	Nominated
TVB Anniversary Awards	Most Popular Male Character	Raymond Wong	Nominated
TVB Anniversary Awards	Most Popular Drama Theme Song	"真心真意" (With All My Heart) by Fred Cheng and Stephanie Ho	Nominated
TVB Anniversary Awards	Most Popular Drama Theme Song	"印記" (Seal of Love) by Kayee Tam	Nominated
