= Zoie Tam =

Hong Kong actress (born 1981)

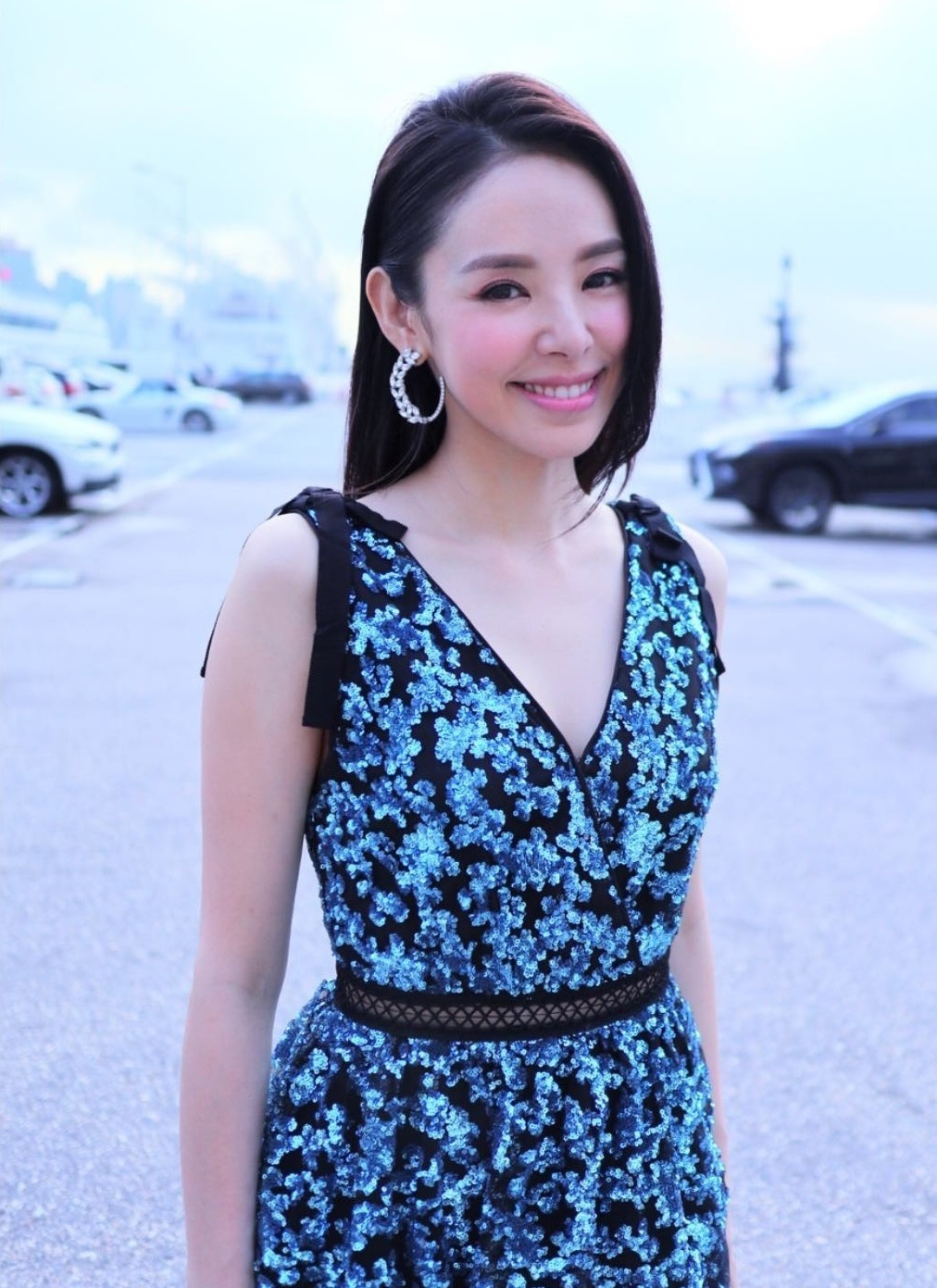
- Tam in 2019
- Born: 10 October 1981 (age 44); British Hong Kong
- Occupations: Singer, Presenter, Actress
- Years active: 2000–present
- Notable work: Over Run Over; My Unfair Lady; The Learning Curve of a Warlord; The Exorcist’s 2nd Meter
- Awards: TVB Star Awards Malaysia – Favourite TVB Most Improved Female Artiste; 2017 May Fortune Smile On You, My Unfair Lady, Legal Mavericks, My Ages Apart

Chinese name
- Traditional Chinese: 譚凱琪
- Simplified Chinese: 谭凯琪
Transcriptions
Standard Mandarin
- Hanyu Pinyin: Tán Kǎi Qí
Yue: Cantonese
- Jyutping: Taam4 Hoi2 Kei4
- Musical career
- Origin: Hong Kong
- Genres: Cantopop, J-pop
- Instrument: Vocal
- Label: Rojam 2000
- Website: Official TVB profile

Zoie Tam Hoi-ki (Chinese: 譚凱琪; born 10 October 1981) is a Hong Kong actress, singer and television presenter currently under Television Broadcasts Limited (TVB) management. She debuted as a singer in Japan and previously acted in Japanese and Hong Kong television station Asia Television (ATV) dramas. She is able to converse in Cantonese, Mandarin, English and Japanese.

== Biography ==
Zoie Tam was born on 10 October 1981 in Hong Kong. She is the third child of a family of four daughters. Her older sister, Nicole Tam (譚凱欣), is a former model and artiste who is now married to Jason Chu (朱永棠), best remembered for his role in the original Young and Dangerous.

Tam attended Queen Maud Secondary School and is a graduate of Hong Kong's Wellington College located in Kowloon Bay. After graduation she went abroad to study in Japan, where she was discovered by a talent scout and popular idol Tetsuya Komuro from talent agency Rojam Entertainment.

In 2020, Tam announced her marriage with her out-of-industry friend, Enrico Chong (莊日宇). In October, she gave birth to the couple’s daughter Gabri via C-section.

Tam became good friends with Grace Chan, Katy Kung and Jessie Sum when filming the drama The Forgotten Valley.

== Career ==
=== Music ===
Zoie Tam signed with Rojam and was trained for four month before debuting with her first album in 2000 Full Of Love (全力愛). The album was released in Cantopop but arranged according to j-pop style. The album was also released in Taiwan by Rock Records. Komuro thought Tam looked Japanese and would be interesting if the public thought a Japanese singer who can sing Cantonese. That same year she released a J-pop singles album of the song Garapagosu-no-JULIET (ガラパゴスのJULIET) remixed in Japanese. Not having much success in Japan, Tam moved to Taiwan to try to enter the Taiwanese music industry. But after spending a year doing mostly modeling advertisement work she decided to return to Hong Kong to break into the industry.

=== Acting ===
Tam made her acting debut in 2002 with a minor role in a low budget film Troublesome Night 13. She later branched out acting in Japanese, Korean and Hong Kong ATV dramas's. She also served briefly as a variety show presenter for ATV before joining cable channel Cable TV in 2007. While at Cable TV Tam co-hosted The Unbelievable and several travel series.

In 2013, Tam signed with Hong Kong's largest television station, Television Broadcasts Limited (TVB). She started participating in variety shows such as All Things Girl (姊妹淘), which focused on fashion, make-up, hair, skincare and health. Tam first acting role with TVB was a supporting role in the 2014 mini series Shades of Life, which depicted Hong Kong society. She gained recognition with her role as "Crystal Lee" in the 2016 drama Over Run Over, earning her first Best Supporting Actress nomination at the 2016 TVB Anniversary Awards. Tam received attention when her sexily dressed character appeared to arouse her co-star. Her performance in the 2017 drama My Unfair Lady won her the Favourite TVB Most Improved Female Artiste award at the 2017 TVB Star Awards Malaysia.

Tam garnered praise for her portrayal of the Japanese spy "Tin Kiu" in the 2018 drama The Learning Curve of a Warlord, starring along with veteran actor Dicky Cheung. In 2020, she had notable performance in the supernatural drama The Exorcist’s 2nd Meter as the sea demon "Thalassa", earning her first nomination for the Most Popular Female Character at the 2020 TVB Anniversary Awards.

== Filmography ==
=== Television dramas ===
==== Television Broadcasts Limited (TVB) ====
Year	English title	Chinese Title	Role	Notes
2014	Shades of Life	我們的天空	Ko Ho-yan 高可人	Major Supporting Role
2015	Young Charioteers	衝線	Chu Chu 朱珠	Supporting Role
2015	Ghost of Relativity	鬼同你OT	Annie	Supporting Role
2015	The Executioner	刀下留人	Nurse 姑娘	Minor Role
2016	Over Run Over	EU超時任務	Crystal Lee Chi-ting 李姿婷	Major Supporting Role Nominated - TVB Star Awards Malaysia for Favourite TVB Most Improved Female Artiste; Nominated - TVB Star Awards Malaysia for Top 15 Favourite TVB Female Characters; Nominated - TVB Anniversary Award for Best Supporting Actress
2016	Presumed Accidents	純熟意外	Whitney Ting Siu-wai 丁小惠	Ep. 17-19 Nominated - TVB Star Awards Malaysia for Favourite TVB Most Improved Female Artiste
2016	A Fist Within Four Walls	城寨英雄	Lau Tai 劉娣	Supporting Role Nominated - TVB Star Awards Malaysia for Favourite TVB Most Improved Female Artiste
2016	Dead Wrong	致命復活	Emma Kwok Cheuk-sze 郭卓詩	Major Supporting Role Nominated - TVB Star Awards Malaysia for Favourite TVB Most Improved Female Artiste
2017	May Fortune Smile On You	財神駕到	Mui Hoi-sum 梅開心	Ep. 30 Won - TVB Star Awards Malaysia for Favourite TVB Most Improved Female Artiste; Nominated - TVB Anniversary Award for Most Improved Female Artiste
2017	My Unfair Lady	不懂撒嬌的女人	Annie Chan Hoi-ching 陳凱澄	Major Supporting Role; Won - TVB Star Awards Malaysia for Favourite TVB Most Improved Female Artiste; Nominated - TVB Anniversary Award for Best Supporting Actress; Nominated - TVB Anniversary Award for Most Improved Female Artiste
2017	Legal Mavericks	踩過界	Ngai Yu-chun 魏雨珍	Ep. 2-3 Won - TVB Star Awards Malaysia for Favourite TVB Most Improved Female Artiste; Nominated - TVB Anniversary Award for Most Improved Female Artiste
2017	My Ages Apart	誇世代	Sheung Ho-ka 尚可嘉	Supporting Role Won - TVB Star Awards Malaysia for Favourite TVB Most Improved Female Artiste; Nominated - TVB Anniversary Award for Most Improved Female Artiste
2018	The Forgotten Valley	平安谷之詭谷傳說	Ng Wai-ming 伍惟明	Major Supporting Role; Nominated - TVB Anniversary Award for Best Supporting Actress
2018	The Learning Curve of a Warlord	大帥哥	Yip Tin-kiu / Maikawa Nai 葉天嬌 / 舞川奈伊	Major Supporting Role
2019	Justice Bao: The First Year	包青天再起風雲	Sum Ching 沈青	Supporting Role
2019	Barrack O'Karma	金宵大廈	Carmen Fong Ka-man 方家敏	Ep. 13–14, 20; Nominated - TVB Anniversary Award for Best Supporting Actress
2020	The Exorcist's 2nd Meter	降魔的2.0	Thalassa / Wan-ying 阿花 / 允瑩	Major Supporting Role; Nominated - TVB Anniversary Award for Best Supporting Actress; Nominated - TVB Anniversary Award for Most Popular Female Character
2020	Ratman to the Rescue	過街英雄	Nadia Ming Cheuk-kei 明卓淇	Major Supporting Role
2020	Legal Mavericks 2020	踩過界II	Ngai Yu-chun 魏雨珍	Guest Appearance in Ep. 22
2021	The Forgotten Day	失憶24小時	Maya Sze Man-nga 施文雅	Major Supporting Role; Nominated - TVB Anniversary Award for Best Supporting Actress; Nominated - TVB Anniversary Award for Most Popular Female Character
2021	Beauty and the Boss	愛美麗狂想曲	"Yan" Ho Yu-yan 何雨欣	Major Supporting Role; Nominated - TVB Anniversary Award for Best Supporting Actress; Nominated - TVB Anniversary Award for Most Popular Female Character; Nominated — People's Choice Television Awards for Best Supporting Actress
2021	Come Home Love: Lo and Behold	愛·回家之開心速遞	Man-yuk 曼玉	Guest appearance in Ep. 1341-1342
2022	ICAC Investigators 2022	廉政行動2022	Man Wing-yi 文詠儀	Major Supporting Role
2022	Brutally Young 2.0	十八年後的終極吿白2.0	Queenie Chong Yui-ting 莊銳婷	Major Supporting Role; Nominated - TVB Anniversary Award for Best Supporting Actress; Nominated - TVB Anniversary Award for Most Popular Female Character
2023	Treasure of Destiny	新四十二章	Frances Kwan Yuk-ching 關玉菁	Major Supporting Role; Nominated - TVB Anniversary Award for Best Supporting Actress
2024	Call of Destiny	異空感應	Chiu Tsz-hung	Major Supporting role

==== Shaw Brothers ====
Year	English title	Chinese Title	Role	Notes
2019	Flying Tiger 2	飛虎之雷霆極戰	Or Man-ying 柯敏瑩	Supporting Role

==== Asia Television (ATV) ====
Year	English title	Chinese Title	Role	Notes
2006	Hong Kong Criminal Files	香港奇案實錄	Hung Yan-wing 洪仁永	
2012	Heart's Beat for Love	親密損友	Chung Ka-yi 鍾家怡	

==== Foreign dramas ====
Year	English title	Chinese Title	Role	Notes
2004	Green Water Hero	绿水英雄		Japanese drama
2005	Yarudora	心跳季節	Zoie	Japanese drama
2005	East of Eden	伊甸之東	Yiu Man 姚敏	Korean drama

=== Films ===
Year	English title	Chinese title	Character
2002	Troublesome Night 13	陰陽路十三之花鬼	Ah may 阿美
2002	Chinese Orthopedist and the Spice Girls	跌打婆與辣妹	Ah Yan 阿欣
2003	Killer 2	少年刀手	Ice
2005	Yarudora		
2008	See You in You Tube	愛‧鬥大	Zoie
2011	All's Well, Ends Well 2011	最強囍事	Work colleague 同事
2014	Apokalips X		Kulat
2018	No Love Left in Tainan		

== Presenter ==
=== TVB ===
Year	English title	Chinese Title	Notes
2016	The Environment	惜‧環境	with Angel Chiang

=== i-CABLE ===
Year	English title	Chinese Title	Notes
2007-2009	Wonderful Life	活得很滋味	with Priscilla Wong & Tony Hung
2008	Lucky Fate	行運有「玄」因	
2009	Master Chef Food Tour	高師傅美食俠客行	
2009	Actuarial Bride	精算俏佳人	
2009-2011	Johnny B Good		
2010	India, One In A Million	印度·千年一嘆	
2010	Europe: Red, White, Green, Black	歐洲四部曲：紅·白·綠·黑	
2010	Speedy Chef	極速大想頭	
2011	Scotland Castle Travel Chronicles	蘇格蘭古堡旅遊事件簿	
2011	Go! To Live In Japan	去吧!日本住囉囉	
2011	Unbelievable. Supernatural Live	靈異直播	
2011	Four reels. Look Around New Zealand	紐西蘭周圍Look	
2011	Four reels. Look Around Thailand	泰國周圍Look	
2012	Loving The East Sea	戀戀東瀛	
2012	Delicious Relationship	美味關係	
2012	World Travel	遨遊天地	
2012	I Love Fiji Life	I Love 斐人生活	
2012-2013	Happy Earth - Guam	快樂地球-關島	
2013	Continue To favor	繼續寵愛	

=== ATV ===
Year	English title	Chinese Title	Notes
2006	Food Angel	美食俏嬌娃	

== Discography ==
=== Studio Album ===
#	English title	Original Title	Release date	Label
1st	Full of Love	全力愛	3 August 2000	Rojam Entertainment Limited
2nd	Galapagos JULIET Maxi	ガラパゴスのJULIET Maxi	15 October 2000	Factory Ormoc
