= The No No Girl =

Hong Kong television series

- Official poster
- Also known as: Full-time Nowhere Woman 師奶大翻身
- 全職沒女
- Genre: Modern, Romance, Comedy
- Created by: Hong Kong Television Broadcasts Limited
- Written by: Chan Kam-ling
- Starring: Eddie Cheung; Adia Chan; Owen Cheung; Jeannie Chan; Brian Tse; Erin Wong; Helena Law; Amy Fan; Max Cheung; Eileen Yeow; Griselda Yeung
- Opening theme: "That's the Way I Am" (我有我美麗) by Nancy Wu
- Country of origin: Hong Kong
- Original language: Cantonese
- No. of episodes: 20

Production
- Executive producer: Catherine Tsang
- Producer: Andy Chan
- Production location: Hong Kong
- Editor: Chan Kam-ling
- Camera setup: Multi camera
- Running time: 45 minutes
- Production company: TVB

Original release
- Network: Jade
- Release: 10 April – 5 May 2017

The No No Girl
- Traditional Chinese: 全職沒女
- Cantonese Yale: Chyùnjīk Muhtnéui
- Literal meaning: "Full-time No Girl"
Transcriptions
Standard Mandarin
- Hanyu Pinyin: Quánzhí méinǚ
- IPA: [tɕʰwǎn.ʈʂǐ měi.nỳ]
Yue: Cantonese
- Yale Romanization: Chyùnjīk Muhtnéui
- IPA: [tsʰyn˩.tsɪk̚˥ mut̚˨.nɵɥ˧˥]

The No No Girl (Chinese: 全職沒女; Cantonese Yale: Chyùnjīk Muhtnéui; lit. "Full-time No Girl") is a 2017 Hong Kong television romantic comedy drama produced by Andy Chan for TVB, starring Eddie Cheung, Adia Chan, Owen Cheung and Jeannie Chan as the main leads, with Brian Tse, Erin Wong, Helena Law, Amy Fan, Max Cheung, Eileen Yeow and Griselda Yeung as the main cast. It premiered on Hong Kong's TVB Jade and Malaysia's Astro On Demand on April 10, 2017 airing Monday through Friday during its 8:30 to 9:30 pm timeslot and concluding May 5, 2017 with a total of 20 episodes.

The No No Girl is lead actress Adia Chan's, comeback series to TVB. Chan's last series with TVB before leaving to explore opportunities in Mainland China was 2006's Trimming Success.

== Synopsis ==
After embarrassingly exposing her fiancée as a cheater during their wedding banquet, Law Lai-ching (Adia Chan) left the wedding. Not wanting their paid Midsummer Night's Garden Hotel suite to go to waste she stays the night with her older sister, Law Lai-chi, and friend/wedding photographer, Ko Sam. Meanwhile, Richmond Chong Fu-ho's (Eddie Cheung), head of Midsummer Night's Garden Hotel who has just won a top executive award, night is ruined when he has to deal with his good for nothing son, Wayne Chong (Owen Cheung), who has taken advantage of his father's position and has an all out drinking party in one of the hotel rooms. While carting his dead drunk son out of the hotel, Richmond finds Lai-ching's abandoned shoe stuck in the elevator. No one seems to be able to pull the shoe out except Richmond, who doesn't find anything out of the ordinary and throws the shoe away.

Three years later Lai-ching works at her almost to be mother-in-law's small bridal studio along with her sister, Lai-chi, and friend, Ko Sam. Lai-ching's almost to be mother-in-law, Dina Buffett, still holds a grudge against Lai-ching for embarrassing her son and cursed Lai-ching to be a spinster for life. During a trip to the airport to pick up her new boyfriend Titan, Lai-ching gets into a minor car accident with Richmond's chauffeured car and immediately recognizes Richmond as a man she had met seven years ago.

After a fallout between Richmond and Wayne, Wayne gets into a bar brawl which leaves him delirious drunk and beaten on the streets. Lai-ching and Ko Sam tend to Wayne but a drunken Wayne mistakes Ko Sam's macaron-shaped USB drive as an actual macaron and eats it. With precious client photos stored in the USB drive Lai-ching has no other choice but to take Wayne to her home, where Wayne pretends to have amnesia in order to stay with her. Richmond soon finds Wayne refusing to come back to the hotel and is working as a wedding videographer.

While Lai-ching books a suite at the Midsummer Night Garden Hotel to prepare for her wedding to her latest fiancée Titan, Richmond encounters a distressed man who can't decide which woman to settle for. After some words of advice from Richmond, the distressed man decides he doesn't want to get married anymore and leaves his fiancée Lai-ching on their wedding day. Blaming Richmond for her latest wedding mishap Lai-Ching seeks out Richmond for revenge only to get drunk when he finds her and then for her to blurt out that he has been the one she always wanted to marry. Richmond seeing Lai-ching is drunk thinks she is speaking nonsense.

It is soon revealed that seven years ago Lai-ching was a former staff member at Midsummer Night's Garden Hotel who highly admired Richmond for his fairness and honorable treatment of the hotel staff. The two had spent a passionate night together which Richmond doesn't seem to remember since he was very drunk.

While at the hotel to repay a bill for damages done to the suite she stayed at, Lai-ching is mistaken by a staff member to be an underprivileged person looking for a job interview the company was conducting. After hearing her sad story about her failure in romance Lai-ching gets hired at Midsummer Night's Garden Hotel. She doesn't want the job but her sister Lai-chi reminds her that they are in need of money since they just repaid a hefty bill to the hotel. Wayne is in a power struggle with his father, Richmond, and forcefully recruits Lai-ching as a staff member of the hotel to make Richmond miserable and also cure Lai-ching of her love sickness for Richmond.

== Cast ==
=== Chong family ===
- Eddie Cheung as Richmond Chong Fu-ho (莊富豪, homophone to 裝富豪, acting like rich man), CEO of Shakespeare Group and head of the Midsummer Night Garden Hotel. Sha Lin-na's (Lina's) ex-husband and Wayne's father. A workaholic who deeply cares how other think of his reputation. Since his divorce from his wife seven years ago he has not been in a relationship. Lai-ching has respected and been secretly in love with him for seven years. Through constant interaction with Lai-ching, Richmond starts to change into a more caring person. He goes to South America to develop the company's business. He and Lai-ching finally get together 4 years later without marriage.
- Owen Cheung as Wayne Chong Chun-wing (莊雋穎), Richmond and Lina's younger son. He has an estranged relationship with his father because Richmond blames him for his older brother's death. Richmond not trusting him with control of the hotel leads to further estrangement between the two with Wayne running away to live and work with Lai-chi as a videographer. He finally becomes the Midsummer's chief and marries Helen, and Muse becomes his mistress.

=== Law, Buffett, Fan household and Bridal studio staff ===
- Eileen Yeow as Law Lai-chi (羅麗芝), Lai-ching's crass and tomboy older sister. She works together with her sister at the small wedding studio owned by Lai-ching's almost to be mother-in-law Dina.
- Adia Chan as Law Lai-ching (羅麗晶, homophone to 攞嚟賤, to get harsh herself), Law Lai-chi's younger sister. A helpless romantic who falls in love with wrong men easily. Each one of her relationships fail miserably when all her fiancees seem to cheat on her close to their wedding day. A former employee at the Midsummer Night's Garden Hotel, she has been secretly in love with Richmond for seven years, later becoming Wayne's stepmother.
- Law Lan as Dina Buffett (homophone to dinner buffet) (癲姐), Owner and boss of a small bridal studio. A self-proclaimed 1/8 French blue blooded. She was Lai-ching's almost to be mother-in-law until her son Mak Lung was caught cheating.
- Brian Tse as Sam Ko Sum (高琛), Lai-ching's friend and wedding photographer at the bridal studio. He is not great at his work and tends to take images of the wedding party at inappropriate times. He has a crush on Hazel. He is later cheated on by Choi Siu-yau, he then becomes a photographer of scantily clad women and ends up being with So Fa (蘇花), one of his photography clients.
- Erin Wong as Hazel Fan Tai-hei (范泰晞) and Choi Siu-yau (蔡小柔), Titan's younger sister who lives with Lai-ching. She is studying to become a doctor which Lai-ching sponsors her tuition. Hazel is Sam's love interest but she only recognizes him as a big brother.
  - as Choi Siu-yau, after Hazel tells Ko Sum she sees him only as a big brother Ko Sum finds a girlfriend who resembles Hazel. Siu-yau ends up cheating on and stealing from Ko Sum.

=== Lok family ===
- Jack Hui as Lok Tin (樂天), Muse's ex-boyfriend and father of Chui-chui.
- Jeannie Chan as Muse Miu Si (繆思), a new maid at the hotel that Wayne is trying to expose as a gold digger and who he thinks is trying to seduce him. Lok Tin's ex-girlfriend.
- Trissy Wan as Lok Chui (樂翠), Lok Tin and Muse's daughter.

=== Midsummer Night Garden Hotel staff ===
- Amy Fan Yik Man as CK Sin Chi-keung(冼志強), Legal Advisor and Richmond's most trusted assistant and has been in love with Richmond for seven years but does not tell Richmond because Richmond transfers women who are infatuated with him to other locations.
- Timothy Cheng as Kung Suen Fun-dau (公孫奮鬥), Finance Manager who Wayne often seeks advice from.
- Raymond Tsang Sau-ming as Szeto Hong-kin (司徒康健), Executive Housekeeper
- Man Yeung as Nam Chor-sau (藍座首)
- Stephen Ho as Sheung Kuen Fa-bo (上官化寶), Food & Beverages Manager
- Fanny Ip as Sze Ma Mei-sing (司馬美星), Marketing Manager
- Mandy Lam as Mo Yung Fong-on (慕容芳荌), Front Office Manager
- Akai Lee as Tsui Jack (徐積), Housekeeping Supervisor who tends to sexually harass all the new younger housekeeping maids.
- Pauline Chow as Tse Ka Yee (謝家儀), Senior Housekeeping staff
- Sunny Tai as Bo Fei (步飛)
- Lam King-kong as Ying Bun (邢奔)
- Chan Wing-chun as Sai Mun Sil-tung (西門嘯冬), Security Manager
- Samantha Chuk Man-kwun as Au Yeung Hill-tak (歐陽曉德)

=== Extended Cast ===
- Griselda Yeung as Lina Sha Lin-na (沙蓮娜), Shakespeare Group's largest shareholder. Richmond's ex-wife and Wayne's mother. She is in love with Fantastic and pressures Richmond to help Fantastic release a music album.
- Max Cheung as Fantastic Tong Fun-yuen (唐泛薳), Lina's current boyfriend whom she is smitten with. He is also a wannabe rock star who Richmond sees as having no talent.
- Rocky Cheng as Titan Fan Tai-tang (范泰騰), Lai-ching's latest fiancée who is also a cheater and runs out on her during their wedding day. Hazel's older brother.
- Julian Gaertner as Drunk Boxer, Guest at the hotel runs outside happy and drunk with her trying to safe him.
- Toby Chan as Pisa K, a singer that Lina uses to accuse Richmond of infidelity in order to get a divorce.
- Aurora Li as Helen, Henry's (a board member of Shakespeare Group) daughter who was urgently called to return to Hong Kong and was unwittingly set up on a blind date with Wayne, much to Wayne's disapproval. She angrily storms off after her dad embarrasses her with the blind date.
- Jasmin Wong as 婚宴司儀 (minor role), MC at Law Lai-ching's wedding to Dina Buffett's son, Mak Lung.

== Development ==
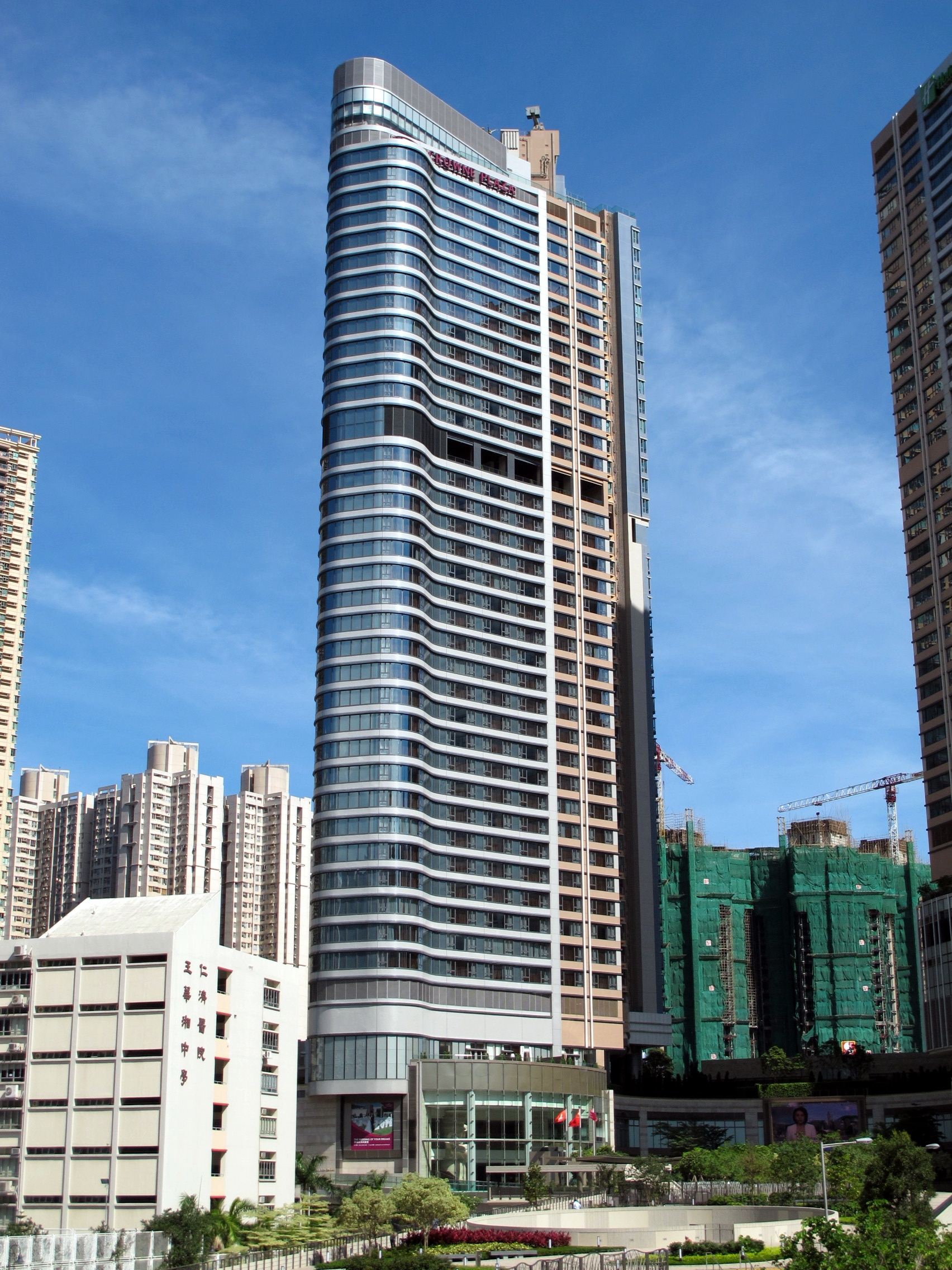
The Crowne Plaza Hong Kong-Kowloon East located at Tseung Kwan O, exterior and roof top swimming pool were used in the drama to depict the fictional Midsummer Night Garden Hotel.

- The costume fitting ceremony was held together on April 15, 2016 at 12:30 pm Tseung Kwan O TVB City Studio One.
- The blessing ceremony was held on May 16, 2016 at 2:00 pm Tseung Kwan O TVB City Studio thirteen.
- Filming took place from April till July 2016, entirely on location in Hong Kong. The Crowne Plaza Hong Kong Kowloon East located at Tower 5, 3 Tong Tak Street, Tseung Kwan O, Hong Kong serves as the exterior for the hotel depicted in the drama.
- In January 2016, TVB executive Virginia Lok (乐易玲), confirmed that TVB was in negotiations with Adia Chan on a 1-year per series contract to return to TVB.
- The No No Girl is both veterans TVB actors Eddie Cheung and Adia Chan's first collaboration playing a couple. Both were previously cast members in TVB's 1996 drama Cold Blood Warm Heart (天地男兒), but didn't have any scenes together as the two were paired up with other cast members.
- Supporting cast member Raymond Tsang (曾守明), suddenly died at the age of 58 on April 23, 2017. The No No Girl was his last drama to broadcast while he was alive.

== Awards and nominations ==
| Association | Category | Nominee | Result |
|---|---|---|---|
| StarHub TVB Awards | My Favourite TVB Drama | | Nominated |
| StarHub TVB Awards | My Favourite TVB Actress | Adia Chan | Nominated |
| StarHub TVB Awards | My Favourite TVB Actor | Eddie Cheung | Nominated |
| StarHub TVB Awards | My Favourite TVB Supporting Actress | Jeannie Chan | Nominated |
| StarHub TVB Awards | My Favourite TVB Female TV Characters | Adia Chan | Nominated |
| StarHub TVB Awards | My Favourite TVB Male TV Characters | Eddie Cheung | Nominated |
| StarHub TVB Awards | My Favourite TVB On-Screen Couple | Eddie Cheung and Adia Chan | Nominated |
| StarHub TVB Awards | My Favourite TVB Drama Theme Song | "我有我美麗" (That's the Way I Am) by Nancy Wu | Nominated |
| TVB Star Awards Malaysia | My Favourite TVB Drama Series | | Nominated |
| TVB Star Awards Malaysia | My Favourite TVB Actor in a Leading Role | Eddie Cheung | Nominated |
| TVB Star Awards Malaysia | My Favourite TVB Actress in a Leading Role | Adia Chan | Nominated |
| TVB Star Awards Malaysia | My Favourite TVB Actress in a Supporting Role | Jeannie Chan | Nominated |
| TVB Star Awards Malaysia | My Favourite TVB Most Improved Actor | Owen Cheung | Nominated |
| TVB Star Awards Malaysia | My Favourite TVB Most Improved Actress | Jeannie Chan | Nominated |
| TVB Anniversary Awards | Best Drama | | Nominated |
| TVB Anniversary Awards | Best Actor | Eddie Cheung | Nominated |
| TVB Anniversary Awards | Best Actress | Adia Chan | Nominated |
| TVB Anniversary Awards | Best Supporting Actress | Eileen Yeow | Nominated |
| TVB Anniversary Awards | Most Popular Male Character | Eddie Cheung | Nominated |
| TVB Anniversary Awards | Most Improved Male Artiste | Owen Cheung | Nominated |
| TVB Anniversary Awards | Most Popular Drama Theme Song | "我有我美麗" (That's the Way I Am) by Nancy Wu | Nominated |

== Viewership Ratings ==
| # | Timeslot (HKT) | Week | Episode(s) | Average points | Peaking points |
|---|---|---|---|---|---|
| 1 | Mon – Fri (8:30-9:30 pm); 20:30–21:30 | 10 – 14 Apr 2017 | 1 — 5 | 21.2 | 24.0 |
| 2 | Mon – Fri (8:30-9:30 pm); 20:30–21:30 | 17 – 21 Apr 2017 | 6 — 10 | 22.6 | 24.8 |
| 3 | Mon – Fri (8:30-9:30 pm); 20:30–21:30 | 24 – 28 Apr 2017 | 11 — 15 | 22.6 | 25.7 |
| 4 | Mon – Fri (8:30-9:30 pm); 20:30–21:30 | 1 – 5 May 2017 | 16 — 20 | 25 | 28.2 |
| Total average | | | | 22.8 | 28.2 |
