= Big Big World (TV programme) =

- Original title: 世界零距離
- Genre: Travel
- Starring: Anthony Fong Tung Shingzh (方東昇); Chan Pui Ka (陳沛珈); Joana Hoiteng U (余凱婷)
- Narrated by: Anthony Fong Tung Shing (方東昇)
- Country of origin: Hong Kong
- Original language: Cantonese

Production
- Production company: TVB

Original release
- Release: 2 December 2013 – 20 January 2017

Big Big World (traditional Chinese: 世界零距離; simplified Chinese: 世界零距离) is a Hong Kong travel television programme produced and broadcast by TVB. It debuted on 2 December 2013. The show's hosts were Anthony Fong Tung Shing (方東昇), Chan Pui Ka (陳沛珈), and Joana Hoiteng U (余凱婷).

== Format ==
The programme features "out-of-the-way" places that are not frequented by Hong Kong residents. The programme is presented by news reporters and presenters with TVB's news division, whereas TVB travel programs usually feature the channel's actors and actresses.

In addition to presenting the sights of each country profiled, the programme also focuses on the social problems faced by each of the countries, in addition to comparing and contrasting them to problems faced by Hong Kong residents.

Each series was broadcast on TVB's digital-only iNews channel, with a condensed omnibus version airing on TVB Jade at a later time.

== Overview ==
=== Series 1 ===
The first series debuted on 2 December 2013, via iNews. The countries visited in the first series include Bhutan, Vanuatu, Tonga, Gibraltar, Jamaica, Jordan, Lithuania, Brazil, and Mongolia.

=== Series 2 ===
Countries featured in the second series include Falkland Islands, French Guiana, Liechtenstein, Cayman Islands, Venezuela, Fiji, Vanuatu, Tuvalu, and Greenland.

=== Series 3 ===
Countries and places featured in the second series include Ethiopia, Vladivostok, Catalonia, Kaliningrad, Ecuador, and Panama. The last episode of the series aired 20 January 2017.

== Reception ==
The Hong Kong Economic Times said the show received "praise for being both entertaining and funny", noting that Anthony Fong Tung Shing's "corny jokes and witty one-liners have spread widely across the internet". The Macao Daily News praised the show as "truly worth watching", citing "the hosts' lively and witty dialogue that make it even more engaging". The newspaper further said that the three presenters have "clear articulation, sharp pronunciation, and quick wit, delivering an outstanding performance".
