= Hoffman Cheng =

Hong Kong male Singer

- 鄭世豪
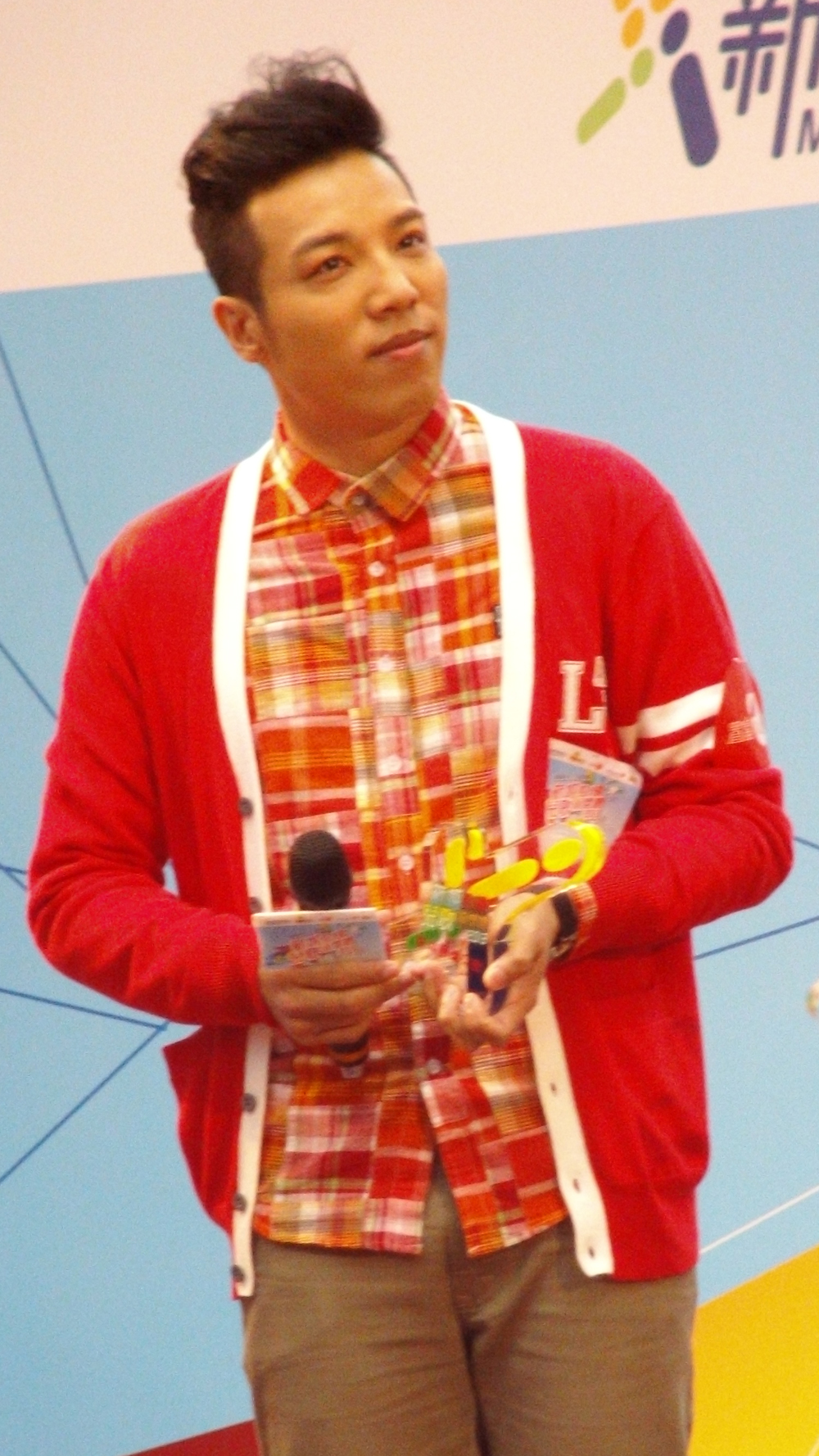
- Cheng in 2014
- Education: Church of Christ in China Rotary Secondary School

Hoffman Cheng Sai-Ho (Chinese: 鄭世豪) is a male artist of Hong Kong TVB Manager Contract and a singer under Sky Team Entertainment Ltd. He was a singer of Star Entertainment and TVB Music Group Limited, and is serving as a guest star singing instructor at SingingSoul Academy Hong Kong as of August 2025.

== Background ==
=== Early life ===
Cheng grew up in the Wong Tai Sin resettlement area in Kowloon and moved to Wong Tai Sin Lower Village when he was in Form 1. He has two older brothers. He participated in basketball at school, and when he was in Form 5, he took part in a school singing competition and represented the school gymnastics team in off-campus competitions. After graduating from Form 5, Cheng studied jewelry design for one year and then worked in the related industry for two years. Cheng joined another jewelry design company which went bankrupt soon after, forcing him to switch career and become a computer server operator. During his shifts as an operator, Cheng used his spare time to participate in several singing competitions in 1999, such as the Shatin Youth Association Singing Competition, 2001 TVB Global Chinese New Talent Singing Contest (stopped in the semi-finals). Cheng and his friends applied for the 17th TVB Artist Training Class in 2001.

== Career ==
Cheng signed a contract with TVB as a contract artist in September 2001. From his early years in the industry to around 2008, in addition to filming TV dramas, he often served as "etiquette gentleman" (responsible for handing out awards or prizes) at the TV station's award ceremonies.

Cheng became an artist that the TV station planned to promote and joined "Star Dream Entertainment" as a singer on November 15 of the same year. Unfortunately, he left Star Dream Entertainment at the end of 2015 because his contract expired without releasing any songs. In 2016, Cheng released his own songs and released his first radio song "Accompany" in May. In September of the same year, he was invited by the record company "Star Entertainment" to join the band and released his second single "Still Persist". The song and music video attracted a lot of attention, and he also won the new artist award and song award at several award ceremonies. He then switched to Sky Team Entertainment Ltd in 2020, continue to release music works at present, also starred in "Come Home Love: Lo and Behold".

On May 24, 2024, Cheng announced on social media that he would leave TVB, ending his 24-year guest-host relationship.
