= Destination Nowhere =

Single by Erika
- Released: November 28, 2007
- Label: Sony Music
- Songwriter(s): Erika Sawajiri; LOVE
- Producer(s): COZZi

Erika singles chronology
"Free" (2007)	"Destination Nowhere" (2007)

"Destination Nowhere" is the second single released by Japanese singer Erika Sawajiri under the alias Erika.

== Single information ==
The single was released in two editions: a first press/limited edition and a regular edition. The regular edition contains the B-sides "ESCAPE", "FREE -overrocket101007 mix-", and the instrumental for "Destination Nowhere". The first press/limited edition contains the music video for "Destination Nowhere". The album jacket covers for both versions are different.

The main song "Destination Nowhere" was used for the TV Asahi 2007 fall drama Mop Girl theme song. The making-of video for "Destination Nowhere" was released on 31 October 2007, and the full video aired on MTV Japan on 5 November 2007.

== Track list ==
Regular Edition
No.	Title	Lyrics	Music	Length
1.	"Destination Nowhere"	Erika, LOVE	COZZi	4:03
2.	"ESCAPE"	Kei Noguchi	Shūhei Kurosaka	3:44
3.	"FREE-overrocket101007 mix-"			4:19
4.	"Destination Nowhere (Instrumental)"			4:03

Limited Edition DVD
No.	Title	Length
1.	"Destination Nowhere (video clip)"	4:02

== Charts ==
Release	Chart	Peak position
November 28, 2007	Oricon Daily Singles Chart	4
November 28, 2007	Oricon Weekly Singles Chart	7
November 28, 2007	Oricon Monthly Singles Chart	18
November 28, 2007	Oricon Yearly Singles Chart	198
