= Brian Tse (singer) =

Hong Kong actor and singer

- 謝東閔
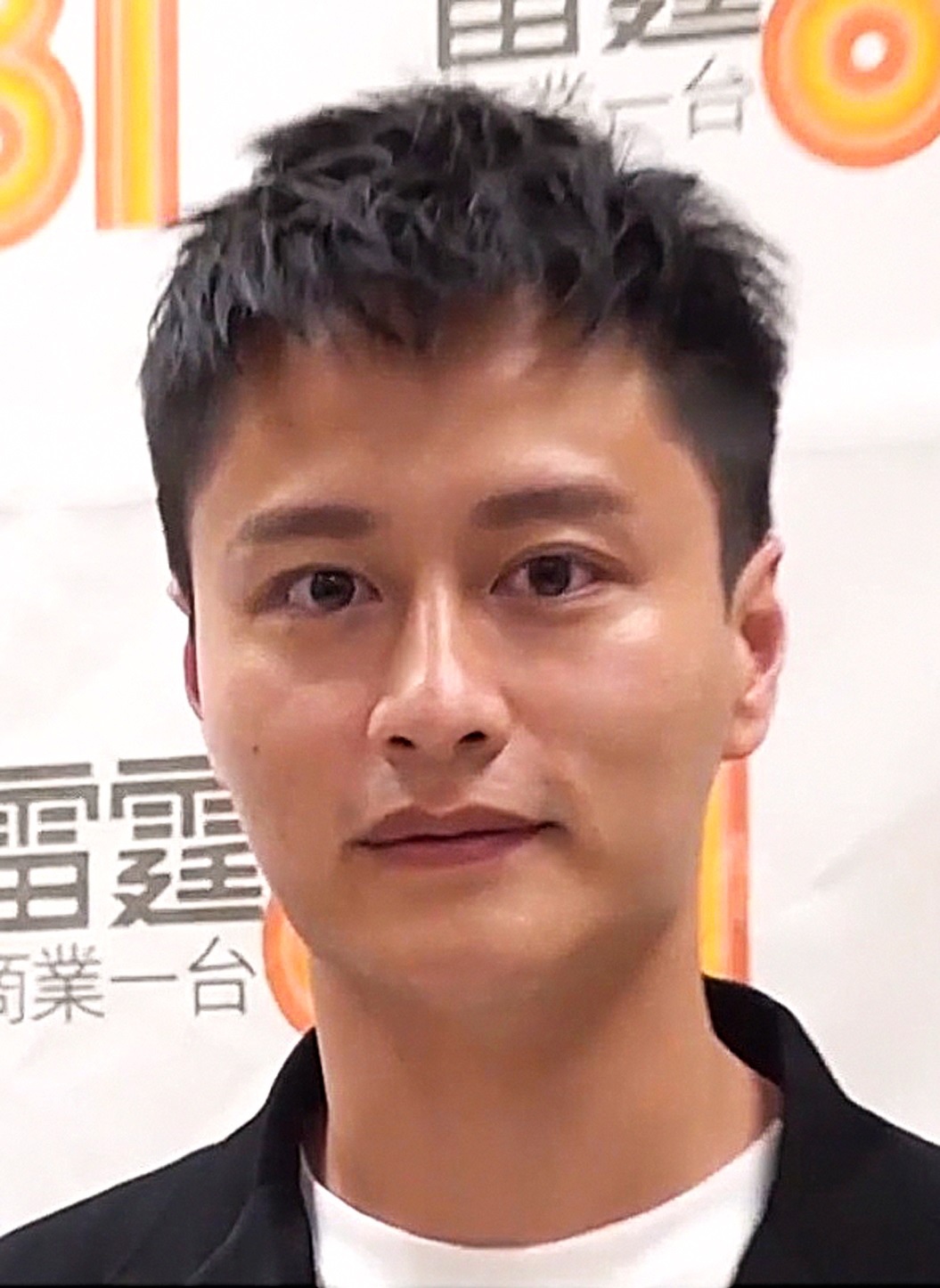
- Tse at the Song Promotion Event 2010
- Born: Tse Tung Man; 6 December 1985 (age 40); Hong Kong
- Education: General Certificate of Secondary Education; United Christian College
- Occupations: Singer; actor; host; entrepreneur
- Years active: 2010–present
- Known for: Show Me the Happy
- Notable work: TV: The No No Girl; Handmaidens United; Death By Zero; Hong Kong Love Stories; Music: The Coldest Day; Flying Dreams; Against the Current
- Awards: StarHub TVB Awards 2017 "TVB Best New Artist"

Chinese name
- Traditional Chinese: 謝東閔
Transcriptions
Standard Mandarin
- Hanyu Pinyin: Xiè Dōngmǐn
Yue: Cantonese
- Jyutping: Ze6 Dung1-man5

Brian Tse Tung Man (Chinese: 謝東閔, 6 December 1985) is a Hong Kong actor, singer and program host. In 2010, he was a contestant on the second season of TVB's The Voice and won 4th place prior joining the entertainment industry. After entering the industry, he mainly focused on filming TV series; he is now a TVB management contract artist and a singer under TVB Music Group Limited.

== Background ==
=== Early life ===
Tse' family is well off. His father runs a hair salon and his mother runs a foreign domestic help agency. He attended United Christian College. He won the runner-up and the Most Promising Performing Arts Award in the Radio Television Hong Kong Mandarin Singing Competition. When he was 16 years old, he went to England to complete a General Certificate of Secondary Education). After graduation, he and his friends jointly ran a fashion purchasing business in Hangzhou. In 2004, he began to learn singing with Tai Sze-chung and became his last apprentice. Before his debut, he participated in the New City + Sony Mandarin Singing Competition and entered the top three.

== Filmography ==
=== Television dramas ===
| Title | Year | Role | Notes |
TVB Dramas
| Show Me the Happy | 2010 | Leon | |
| Dropping By Cloud Nine | 2011 | John | Ep.3 |
| Forensic Heroes III | 2011 | Lawrence Yuen Chi-hung | Supporting Role |
| The Hippocratic Crush | 2012 | Dr. Chui Shui-wah (Chui Shui) | Supporting Role |
| Daddy Good Deeds | 2012 | The Voice contestant | Ep.8-9 |
| Ghetto Justice II | 2012 | Doctor | Ep.20 |
| Divas in Distress | 2012 | Kai Chong-kai | Supporting Role |
| Sergeant Tabloid | 2013 | Tai Tung-man (Big Eyes) | Supporting Role; released overseas in April 2012 |
| A Change of Heart | 2013 | Wilson | |
| Awfully Lawful | 2013 | Julian Chu Lei-nga | Supporting Role |
| The Hippocratic Crush II | 2013 | Dr. Chui Shui-wah (Chui Shui) | Supporting Role |
| ICAC Investigators 2014 | 2014 | Ko Ka-ming | Ep.4 |
| Come Home Love | 2014 | Alan Kei Wing-luen | Supporting Role |
| All That Is Bitter Is Sweet | 2014 | Kam Fuk | Supporting Role |
| Officer Geomancer | 2014 | Cyrus | Ep.9-10 |
| Love as a Predatory Affair | 2016 | Lo Kai-lun | Major Supporting Role |
| Come Home Love | 2016 | Alan Kei Wing-luen | Ep.973 |
| Rogue Emperor | 2016 | Ngau Yuk-kon | Major Supporting Role |
| The No No Girl | 2017 | Ko Sum | Major Supporting Role |
| Line Walker: The Prelude | 2017 | Cheung Tat-kiu (Tak Q) | Supporting Role |
| Come Home Love: Lo and Behold | 2017-present | Kam Shing-mo | Ep.81-82, 145, 217, 293-294, 352, 686 |
| The Forgotten Valley | 2018 | Chow Hok-man | Supporting Role |
| Flying Tiger | 2018 | SGT Au Chi-hoi (Ka Bei Zai) | Supporting Role |
| The Defected | 2019 | Chan Kwok-sing | Supporting Role |
| Handmaidens United | 2019 | Fu Yau-wai | Major Supporting Role |
| Death By Zero | 2020 | Parker Kwan Kai-yeung | Major Supporting Role |
| Line Walker: Bull Fight | 2020 | Cheung Tat-kiu (Tak Q) | Ep.19 |
| Hong Kong Love Stories | 2020 | Heyman Ki Ka-hei | Major Supporting Role |
| The Offliners | 2020 | Wong Tsz-pok | Major Supporting Role |
| Murder Diary | 2021 | So Kwok-shing | Supporting Role |
| AI Romantic | 2021 | Angus Chung | Introduced in Ep. 22 |
| Battle Of The Seven Sisters | 2021 | Barry Tai Wai-cheong | Guest Appearance |
| Barrack O'Karma 1968 | 2022 | Tai Kai | Introduced in Ep. 12 |
| ICAC Investigators 2022 | 2022 | Chan Pok-tai | Major Supporting Role |
| Against Darkness | 2022 | Lee Man-kit | Major Supporting Role |
| The Spectator | 2024 | Ma Tsz-yeung | Supporting Role |
| A Fallen Xian | 2024 | Lü Dongbin | Main Role |

=== Other appearances ===
| Title | Year | Role | Notes |
|---|---|---|---|
| The Voice 2 | 2010 | Himself | 11 episodes |
