= Moon Lau =

Hong Kong actress (born 1989)

- 劉佩玥
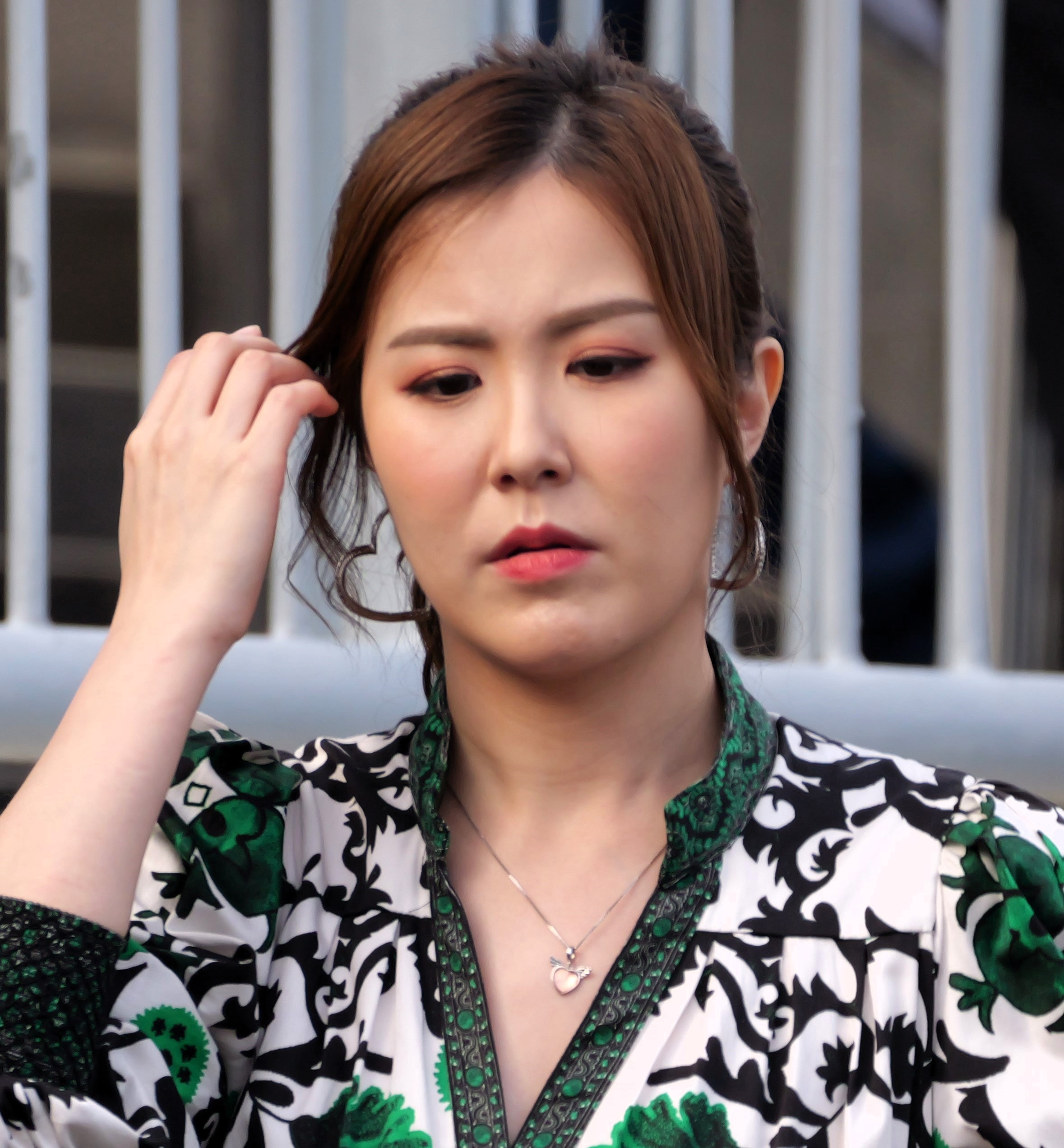
- Lau in 2024
- Born: 9 September 1989 (age 36); British Hong Kong
- Occupations: Actress; television host; author
- Years active: 2013–present
- Notable work: Two Steps from Heaven; The Exorcist's Meter series Life on the Line; The Beauty of War
- Awards: Full list

Chinese name
- Traditional Chinese: 劉佩玥
- Simplified Chinese: 刘佩玥
Transcriptions
Standard Mandarin
- Hanyu Pinyin: Liú Pèiyuè
Yue: Cantonese
- Yale Romanization: Làuh Pui-yuht
- Jyutping: Lau4 Pui3jyut6
- Website: webpage

Moon Lau Pui-yuet (Chinese: 劉佩玥, born 9 September 1989) is a Hong Kong actress under Television Broadcasts Limited (TVB) management. She also holds the second runner-up title of the 2013 Miss Hong Kong Pageant.

== Early and personal life ==
Moon Lau was born in Hong Kong and lived with a large family of seven. Her mother, Lam Kiu (林嬌), was contestant #15 in the 1985 Miss Hong Kong Pageant. She also has a younger brother. Lau attended Baptist Lui Ming Choi Secondary School located in the Sha Tin district of Hong Kong. In 2011, she graduated from Hong Kong Baptist University with a Bachelor of Social Sciences in Communication (Honours), majoring in Film and Media Arts.

During university, Lau worked as a model, signed under agency Jacso Entertainment for two years. After graduating from university she worked as an airline flight attendant for two years and later as a project manager before signing up for the 2013 Miss Hong Kong Pageant.

=== Friendship ===
Lau became best friends with Jeannie Chan and Stephanie Ho as they became close while filming the drama Raising the Bar. She is also good friends with William Chak, Adrian Chau, Daniel Chau, Bob Cheung, Matthew Ho, Hubert Wu, Jacky Cai and Hera Chan.

== Career ==
=== Pageant career (2013) ===
Lau entered the 2013 Miss Hong Kong Pageant in May 2013. She was contestant #6 and was the tallest of all participants, standing at 5'8.5″. The final list of 20 contestants were revealed at a press conference on 4 July 2013. Lau's chosen location for her photoshoot was Taipei, Taiwan, where she was grouped together with fellow contestants Sisley Choi and Vicky Chan. The semifinal round was held live on 25 August 2013. Lau's Q&A question was given by Carol Cheng, who asked Lau the size of the home she grew up in since she came from a large family of seven, to which Lau answered, "I grew up in a comfortably well-off family. Our house is about a 1,000 feet." With 29,835 votes, Lau became the fifth of ten total contestants to make it into the final round. On 1 September 2013, she was crowned the 2013 Miss Hong Kong second runner-up with a total of 60,000 votes.

=== Acting career (2015–present) ===
After participating in the 2013 Miss Hong Kong Pageant, Lau hosted variety shows as a beginner. In 2014, she filmed her first television drama, Raising The Bar, which was broadcast in early 2015. In mid-late 2016, Lau starred in the critically acclaimed martial arts drama A Fist Within Four Walls. She won the Best New TVB Artiste award at the 2016 StarHub TVB Awards and the Favourite TVB Most Improved Female Artiste award at the 2016 TVB Star Awards Malaysia. In the drama Two Steps from Heaven, Lau gained recognition with her role as the third party of Bosco Wong’s character and garnered her first Best Supporting Actress nomination at the 2016 TVB Anniversary Awards. With her performance in 2016, she earned her first nomination for Most Improved Female Artiste as well.

In 2017, Lau's performance in the critically acclaimed supernatural drama The Exorcist's Meter was well received, for which she garnered her first Most Popular Female Character nomination at the 2017 TVB Anniversary Awards. In 2018, Lau took on her first female leading role in the drama Life On The Line, earning her first Best Actress nomination at the 2018 TVB Anniversary Awards. In December 2018, she starred as the female lead in the drama Wife Interrupted, again collaborating with Hubert Wu.

In 2020, Lau reprised her role in the sequel The Exorcist’s 2nd Meter, for which she was placed among the top 5 nominees for the Most Improved Female Artiste at the 2020 TVB Anniversary Awards. In 2021, Lau received attention with her villainous role in the crime drama Sinister Beings. With her role in the time-travelling drama Take Two, she was placed among the top 5 nominees for the Best Supporting Actress at the 2021 TVB Anniversary Awards.

At the 2022 TVB Anniversary Awards, Lau won the Favourite TVB Actress in Malaysia award for her role, Lee Ching-yee in The Beauty of War.

== Published works ==
Lau had been influenced by her grandfather, who was an author, into reading and writing books since she was young. One of her lifetime goals was to release her own book before the age of 30. After stepping into the entertainment industry, Lau focused on acting, but she never forgot about her childhood dream of becoming an author.

=== Smiling My Way Through (2018) ===
In April 2018, Lau went to America with her makeup artist and photographer to take photos for her book. She wrote a book on her own life experiences as well as her journey to becoming an actress. On 7 July 2018, Lau officially announced on Instagram that she would be releasing her own multimedia book called Smiling My Way Through (我的微笑之道)' on 18 July 2018, and it would be featuring at the Hong Kong Book Fair that year. Since it was a self-funded book, only 3000 copies were printed, where part of it was sold online to international fans. With positive feedback on her first book, Lau expressed she would consider writing a second book in 2019.

== Filmography ==
=== TVB ===
Year	English title	Chinese title	Role	Notes
2015	Raising the Bar	四個女仔三個BAR	Holly Tsang Ho-Yan (曾可欣)	Major Supporting Role
2015	Wudang Rules	潮拜武當	Yeung Sam-Wu (楊三瑚)	Supporting Role
2015	Angel In-the-Making	實習天使	Abby Tang Lai-Ching (鄧勵幀)	Major Supporting Role
2016	Over Run Over	EU超時任務	Ho Siu-Mei (賀小美)	Supporting Role
2016	Blue Veins	殭	Rosa Law Wing-Yee (羅穎兒)	Supporting Role
2016	House of Spirits	一屋老友記	Lui Sing-Sun (呂星晨)	Supporting Role
2016	A Fist Within Four Walls	城寨英雄	Audrey Or Tak-Li (柯德莉)	Major Supporting Role
2016	Two Steps from Heaven	幕後玩家	Emma Yip Yip (葉燁)	Major Supporting Role
2017	The Exorcist's Meter	降魔的	Bella Pui Pui-Na (貝貝娜)	Major Supporting Role
2017	My Ages Apart	誇世代	Annoying Customer (麻煩客)	Guest Appearance (ep. 15)
2018	Life on the Line	跳躍生命線	Tanya Cheung Ho-Kei (章可祈)	Main Role
2018	Wife Interrupted	救妻同學會	Jill Chiu Cheuk-Wing / Lam Ka-Yu (趙卓穎 / 林家榆)	Main Role
2019	Our Unwinding Ethos	十二傳說	Topaz Wong Yuk (黃玉)	Major Supporting Role
2020	The Exorcist’s 2nd Meter	降魔的 2.0	Bella Pui Pui-Na (貝貝娜)	Major Supporting Role
2020	The Offliners	堅離地愛堅離地	Moment Cheung Loi (張萊)	Major Supporting Role
2021	Armed Reaction 2021	陀槍師姐2021	Cheuk Yee-Ting (卓依婷)	Guest Appearance (ep. 1)
2021	Sinister Beings	逆天奇案	Rachel Yau Lai / Ha Yau-Lai (尤麗 / 夏悠麗)	Major Supporting Role
2021	Battle Of The Seven Sisters	七公主	Maya Cheuk Mei-Nga (卓美雅)	Major Supporting Role
2021	The Line Watchers	把關者們	Fong Ching-Long (方晴朗)	Major Supporting Role
2021	Take Two	換命真相	Purple Yeung Tsz-Shan (楊紫山)	Major Supporting Role
2021	A Love Of No Words	十月初五的月光	Shun’s Girlfriend (信女友)	Supporting Role
2022	The Righteous Fists	鐵拳英雄	Po Ching-Sum (步青心)	Supporting Role
2022	The Beauty of War	美麗戰場	Joey Lee Ching-Yee (李靜兒)	Main Role
2022	I’ve Got The Power	超能使者	Ting Shuk-Man (丁淑敏)	Major Supporting Role
2023	The Invisibles	隱形戰隊	Shadow To Siu-Chik (杜小婕)	Major Supporting Role
2023	Speakers of Law	法言人	Carol Cheng Chin-Yuk (鄭千玉)	Special Appearance (ep.1)
2023	Secret Door	隱門	Hailey Tang Hei-Yi (鄧希宜)	Major Supporting Role
2024	Sinister Beings 2	逆天奇案II	Ha Yau-Sin (夏悠倩)	Major Supporting Role
2025	Anonymous Signal	奪命提示	Keung Hei-Man (姜曦文)	Major Supporting Role
2025	Heroes in White	俠醫	Natalie Shum Yee-Ting (沈綺婷)	Major Supporting Role
2025	The Queen of Castle	巨塔之后	Man Yee-Ka (文以珈)	Major Supporting Role
TBA		非份之罪	Cheuk Yee-Ting (卓依婷)	Major Supporting Role

=== Shaw Brothers ===
Year	Drama	Chinese title	Character	Role
2019	Flying Tiger 2	飛虎之雷霆極戰	Ting Sin-kwan (丁羡君)	Guest Appearance
2025	Prism Breakers	執法者們	Tsui Sze-sze (徐思思)	Supporting Role

=== Television host ===
Year	English title	Chinese title	Other Hosts
2013-2015	Own Sweet Home	安樂蝸	Bella Lam, Erin Wong, Cindy Yeung, Det Dik, Alex Yung
2014-2015	Youth Nation	激優一族	Matthew Ho, Kayee Tam, Jarvis Chow, Christy Chan
2015	Y Angle		Matthew Ho, Kayee Tam, Jarvis Chow, Christy Chan, Jarryd Tam, Dickson Yu, Charles Sze-To
2017	Wellness On The Go	星級健康	Nancy Wu, Elaine Yiu, Chris Lai, Katy Kung
2018	Fun Abroad (Season 2)	3日2夜 (第二輯)	Jeannie Chan
2019	Inter Inter Intergen	跨跨跨世代	Susan Tse
2019	Fun Abroad (Season 3)	3日2夜 (第三輯)	Meiki Wong
2021		解構心機女	Crystal Fung, Kaman Kong, Winki Lai, Joey Thye

== Awards and nominations ==
=== Miss Hong Kong 2013 ===
Year	Award	Result
2013	Miss Hong Kong 2nd Runner-up	Won

=== StarHub TVB Awards ===
Year	Award	Drama	Role	Result
2016	Best New TVB Artiste	—N/a	—N/a	Won
2016	My Favourite TVB Supporting Actress	A Fist Within Four Walls (城寨英雄)	Audrey Or Tak-li (柯德莉)	Nominated
2017	My Favourite TVB Female Characters	Two Steps From Heaven (幕後玩家)	Emma Yip Yip (葉燁)	Nominated

=== TVB Star Awards Malaysia ===
Year	Award	Drama	Role	Result
2016	Favourite TVB Most Improved Female Artiste	Over Run Over, Blue Veins, House of Spirits, A Fist Within Four Walls	—N/a	Won
2016	Favourite TVB Supporting Actress	A Fist Within Four Walls (城寨英雄)	Audrey Or Tak-li (柯德莉)	Top 3
2016	Top 15 Favourite Drama Characters	A Fist Within Four Walls (城寨英雄)	Audrey Or Tak-li (柯德莉)	Nominated
2016	Favourite TVB Onscreen Couple (with Philip Ng)	A Fist Within Four Walls (城寨英雄)	—N/a	Nominated
2016	Online Most Beloved Star	—N/a	—N/a	Nominated

=== TVB Anniversary Awards ===
Year	Award	Drama	Role	Result
2016	Most Improved Female Artiste	Over Run Over, Blue Veins, House of Spirits, A Fist Within Four Walls, Two Steps From Heaven	—N/a	Nominated
2016	Best Supporting Actress	Two Steps From Heaven (幕後玩家)	Emma Yip Yip (葉燁)	Nominated
2017	Most Popular Female Character	The Exorcist's Meter (降魔的)	Bella Pui Pui-na (貝貝娜)	Nominated
2018	Favourite TVB Actress in Singapore	Life on the Line (跳躍生命線)	Tanya Cheung Ho-kei (章可祈)	Nominated
2018	Favourite TVB Actress in Malaysia	Life on the Line (跳躍生命線)	Tanya Cheung Ho-kei (章可祈)	Nominated
2018	Best Actress	Life on the Line (跳躍生命線)	Tanya Cheung Ho-kei (章可祈)	Nominated
2018	Most Popular Female Character	Wife Interrupted (救妻同學會)	Jill Chiu Cheuk-wing (趙卓穎)	Nominated
2019	Best Supporting Actress	Our Unwinding Ethos (十二傳說)	Topaz Wong-yuk (黃玉)	Nominated
2020	Most Improved Female Artiste	The Exorcist's 2nd Meter (降魔的2.0)	Bella Pui Pui-na (貝貝娜)	Top 5
2020	Best Supporting Actress	The Exorcist's 2nd Meter (降魔的2.0)	Bella Pui Pui-na (貝貝娜)	Nominated
2021	Most Improved Female Artiste	Sinister Beings, Battle of The Seven Sisters, The Line Watchers, Take Two	—N/a	Top 10
2021	Best Supporting Actress	Sinister Beings (逆天奇案)	Rachel Yau Lai (尤麗)	Nominated
2021	Best Supporting Actress	Take Two (換命真相)	Purple Yeung Tsz-shan (楊紫山)	Top 5
2021	Most Popular Female Character	Sinister Beings (逆天奇案)	Rachel Yau Lai (尤麗)	Nominated
2021	Most Popular Female Character	Take Two (換命真相)	Purple Yeung Tsz-shan (楊紫山)	Nominated
2021	Most Popular Onscreen Partnership (with Jonathan Cheung)	Sinister Beings (逆天奇案)	—N/a	Nominated
2022	Most Improved Female Artiste	The Righteous Fists, The War of Beauties, I’ve Got The Power	—N/a	Top 5
2022	Best Actress	The War of Beauties (美麗戰場)	Lee Ching-yi (李靜兒)	Top 10
2022	Most Popular Female Character	The War of Beauties (美麗戰場)	Lee Ching-yi (李靜兒)	Top 5
2022	Favourite TVB Actress in Malaysia	The War of Beauties (美麗戰場)	Lee Ching-yi (李靜兒)	Won
2022	Most Popular Onscreen Partnership (with Jeannie Chan, Hera Chan)	The War of Beauties (美麗戰場)	—N/a	Nominated
2022	Most Popular Onscreen Partnership (with Bob Lam)	The War of Beauties (美麗戰場)	—N/a	Top 5
2023	Best Actress	The Invisibles (隱形戰隊)	Shadow To Siu-Chik (杜小婕)	Top 5
2023	Favourite TVB Actress in Greater Bay Area	The Invisibles (隱形戰隊)	Shadow To Siu-Chik (杜小婕)	Top 5
2023	Favourite TVB Actress in Malaysia	The Invisibles (隱形戰隊)	Shadow To Siu-Chik (杜小婕)	Nominated
2023	Best Supporting Actress	Secret Door (隱門)	Hailey Tang Hei-yi (鄧希宜)	Top 10

=== People's Choice Television Awards ===
Year	Category	Drama	Role	Result
2016	People’s Choice Most Improved Female Artiste	A Fist Within Four Walls (城寨英雄)	Audrey Or Tak-li (柯德莉)	Top 5 (Ranked 3rd)
2017	People’s Choice Most Improved Female Artiste	The Exorcist's Meter (降魔的)	Bella Pui Pui-na (貝貝娜)	Won
2017	People’s Choice Best Supporting Actress	The Exorcist's Meter (降魔的)	Bella Pui Pui-na (貝貝娜)	Top 5 (Ranked 2nd)
2018	People’s Choice Most Improved Female Artiste	Life on the Line, Wife, Interrupted, Fun Abroad	—N/a	Top 5 (Ranked 3rd)
2021	People’s Choice Most Improved Female Artiste	Sinister Beings, Battle Of The Seven Sisters, The Line Watchers, Take Two	—N/a	Nominated
2021	People’s Choice Best Supporting Actress	Sinister Beings (逆天奇案)	Rachel Yau Lai (尤麗)	Nominated
2021	People’s Choice Best Supporting Actress	Take Two (換命真相)	Purple Yeung Tsz-shan (楊紫山)	Nominated

=== Hong Kong Television Awards ===
Year	Category	Drama	Role	Result
2017	Best Supporting Actress in Drama Series	The Exorcist's Meter (降魔的)	Bella Pui Pui-na (貝貝娜)	Won

=== AEG Entertainment Awards ===
Year	Category	Drama	Result
2022	Best Couple (with Bob Lam)	The War of Beauties (美麗戰場)	Won

=== Yahoo Asia Buzz Awards ===
Year	Category	Work	Result
2022	Popular Television Couple (with Jeannie Chan and Hera Chan)	The War of Beauties (美麗戰場)	Won

Preceded by Tracy Chu 朱千雪	Miss Hong Kong Pageant 2nd Runner-Up; 2013	Succeeded by Katherine Ho 何艷娟
