= Jeannie Chan =

Hong Kong actress-model

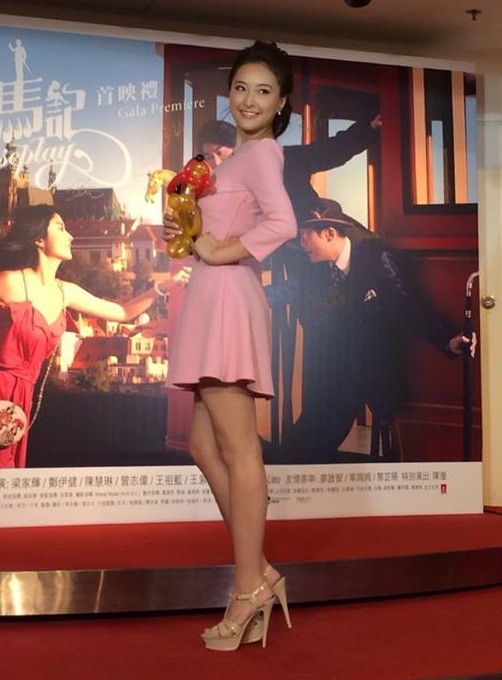
- Chan at the Horseplay movie premiere in Hong Kong
- Born: Jeannie Zheng (鄭鈺瀅); 22 October 1989 (age 37); Toronto, Ontario, Canada
- Occupations: Actress; model
- Years active: 2010–present
- Notable work: The No No Girl; Life on the Line; Your Highness

Chinese name
- Traditional Chinese: 陳瀅
- Simplified Chinese: 陈滢
Transcriptions
Standard Mandarin
- Hanyu Pinyin: Chén Yíng

Jeannie Chan (Chinese: 陳瀅; pinyin: Chén Yíng; born October 22, 1989) is a Canadian-born Hong Kong actress and model. She is currently signed to Shaw Brothers management and has an artiste contract with TVB.

== Early life ==
Jeannie Chan was born in Toronto, Ontario on 22 October 1989, as Zheng Yuk-ying (鄭鈺瀅). Chan moved to Vancouver at a young age, where she grew up. She and her older sister were raised by her grandmother. Her father died when she was very young and her mother remarried. She formed a close bond with her stepfather, and later decided to change her surname to follow his, (Chan) and her name to Chan Ying (陳瀅). She also has a younger half-brother. She graduated from University of British Columbia with a Bachelor of Business Administration, being an exchange student in City University of Hong Kong for a year.

== Career ==
=== Modelling ===
Jeannie Chan became a model when she was an exchange student in Hong Kong and later joined the modelling agency Starzpeople. Since then, she has been appeared in numerous Hong Kong advertisements, usually working with skin care, makeup and fashion brands. Chan released her own photo book Half-Transparent Dancer (半透明的舞孃) on 21 August 2015. In 2018, she concluded her contract with Starzpeople as she wanted to focus on acting.

=== Acting ===
In 2013, Chan signed a preliminary contract with TVB and began to act in dramas. In 2014, she starred in her first TVB drama 'Never Dance Alone' as the teen version of Yung Dan Dan. In 2015, Chan got her first major role in the drama Raising The Bar and garnered her first Best Supporting Actress nomination at the 2015 TVB Anniversary Awards.

In 2017, Chan starred in the drama The No No Girl, which rose her to popularity and she is often referred to as "goddess"(女神) by the media. With her role in the drama, she received multiple nominations, including Best Supporting Actress and Most Improved Female Artiste. Chan also filmed a short comedy for the drama named Bad Hotel Guest, which achieved 1.3M+ views and received a Finalist Certificate from the New York Film Festival.

In early 2018, Chan guest starred in the drama The Forgotten Valley. Despite her short screen time, her performance was praised by viewers as she had to experience uncomfortable times during filming. On 21 March 2018, she signed a 5-year artiste management contract with Shaw Brothers. In October 2018, Chan starred in the drama Life on the Line, in which she was praised for doing multiple crying scenes well.

In February 2019, Chan starred in drama The Ghetto-Fabulous Lady and was praised for her improvement in acting. In April 2019, her first drama as the first female lead, ICAC Investigators 2019, was aired. In January 2020, Chan starred as the second female lead in the drama Of Greed and Ants, earning her first Best Actress and Most Popular Female Character nominations at the 2020 TVB Anniversary Awards.

== Personal life ==
=== Friendship ===
Chan is best friends with Stephanie Ho and Moon Lau as they became close when filming the drama Raising The Bar in 2014. She also shared an apartment with Stephanie Ho for a year (2015–2016). She is also good friends with Winki Lai, Kandy Wong, Cheronna Ng, Anjaylia Chan and Venus Wong from filming the drama Never Dance Alone, they are known as M Club. In 2020, Chan, along with Stephanie Ho, Winki Lai, Sisley Choi, Anjaylia Chan and Cheronna Ng, named their friendship group SÏXTERS. She also become good friends with Kalok Chow, Brian Chu and Joey Wong after filming the drama Your Highness in 2021, naming their friendship group SSFN.

She has three dogs, Diesel, Baymax, and Kumo.

=== Relationship ===
In December 2015, Chan admitted that she was in a relationship with Arnaldo Ho, the son of Macau casino tycoon Stanley Ho, but announced their break up in July 2016.

== Business ==
In March 2017, Jeannie and her best friend, Anna, established an online jewellery brand called, Onliest & Co. In December, they launched a HMV flagship pop up store in Causeway Bay.

== Filmography ==
=== Television dramas ===
==== TVB ====
Year	English title	Chinese title	Role	Notes
2014	Never Dance Alone	女人俱樂部	Yung Dan-Dan - youth (容丹丹)	Minor Role
2015	Raising the Bar	四個女仔三個BAR	Brittany Fok Tsz-Ying (霍紫凝)	Major Supporting Role
2016	Fashion War	潮流教主	Meg Lam Ho-Tung (林可彤)	Supporting Role
2016	Blue Veins	殭	Yuen Bing (阮冰)	Supporting Role
2016	House of Spirits	一屋老友記	Jeannie	Guest Appearance (ep. 31)
2016	Come Home Love: Dinner at 8	愛·回家之八時入席	Vivian Wan Fei-Fei - youth (雲飛飛)	Guest Appearance (ep. 42-43,106-109)
2017	The No No Girl	全職沒女	Muse Miu Sze (繆思)	Major Supporting Role
2017	My Ages Apart	誇世代	Sheung Hing-Duen - youth (尚慶端)	Guest Appearance
2018	The Forgotten Valley	平安谷之詭谷傳說	Yau Ching-Lan (邱青蘭)	Guest Appearance
2018	Life on the Line	跳躍生命線	Luna Heung Moon-Yuet (向滿月)	Major Supporting Role
2019	The Ghetto-Fabulous Lady	福爾摩師奶	Sugar Ngai So-Ka (魏素嘉)	Major Supporting Role
2019	ICAC Investigators 2019	廉政行動2019	Sum Wing-Kwan (沈泳君)	Main Role
2020	Of Greed And Ants	黃金有罪	Shui Man-Ting (水敏婷)	Major Supporting Role
2020	The Exorcist's 2nd Meter	降魔的2.0	Jeannie	Guest Appearance (ep. 19-20)
2021	Beauty And The Boss	愛美麗狂想曲	Lee Siu-Yong (李小勇)	Major Supporting Role
2021	Shadow of Justice	伙記辦大事	Sheung Siu (常笑)	Major Supporting Role
2021	Battle of the Seven Sisters	七公主	Moon Chiu Kwan-Yuet / Wu Chung-Chau (趙君月 / 胡頌秋)	Major Supporting Role
2022	Your Highness	痞子殿下	Nap Hak Wan-Yau / Man Yi (納克溫柔 / 蠻儀)	Main Role
2022	The Beauty of War	美麗戰場	Michelle Chung Ka-po (鍾家寶)	Main Role
2023	My Pet My Angel	寵愛Pet Pet	Guest	Guest Appearance
2025	Your Highness 2	痞子無間道	Fu Ling (符玲)	Main Role
2026	Pretty Dangerous	臥底嬌娃	Kong Miu-che (江妙姿)	Major Supporting Role
2026	This City Never Sleeps	璀璨之城	Sarah Fok Pui-wa (霍佩樺)	Major Supporting Role

==== Shaw Brothers ====
Year	English title	Chinese title	Character	Role
2018	Guardian Angel	守護神之保險調查	Joanne	Guest Appearance
2021	Flying Tiger III	飛虎之壯志英雄	Ho Ka-Bo (何家寶)	Major Supporting Role
2025	Prism Breaker	執法者們	Chau Yan-ting (周欣婷)	Major Supporting Role

Youku

Year	English title	Chinese title	Character	Role
2024	The Heir to the Throne	家族榮耀之繼承者	Noelle Yau Chi-tung (丘芷彤)	Major Supporting Role

=== Film ===
Year	English title	Chinese title	Role
2012	Cold War	寒戰	Nicole Chan (陳少珍)
2013	Together	在一起	Siu-bing (小冰)
2013	Piece of Cake (short film)		Michelle
2013	Tales from the Dark 1	迷離夜	Mrs. Cheung (張太太)
2014	Horseplay	盜馬記	Lee Tan's daughter
2016	Cold War 2	寒戰2	Nicole Chan (陳少珍)
2019	Red Shoes and the Seven Dwarfs (Hong Kong)	魔鏡肥緣	Snow White (voice)
2021	All U Need Is Love	總是有愛在隔離	Milky
2023	Prison Flowers	女子監獄	Bobo Chan Bo-ling (陳寶玲)

=== Host ===
Year	English title	Chinese title	Other host(s)
2018	Fun Abroad (Season 2)	3日2夜 (第二輯)	Moon Lau
2023	Travel Buddies	約埋班Friend去旅行	Kalok Chow, Brian Chu, Joey Wong

== Television commercials ==
- 2010 Pizza Hut: Commercial for new menu item (Chinese: 海班火山批)
- 2010 Standard Chartered Bank: New plan (Chinese: 優先理財 「優先全面賞」計劃 - 超錯四眼仔)
- 2011 1-Day ACUVUE Moist
- 2011 Hong Kong Disneyland TV Commercial (Chinese: 飛躍奇妙5周年)
- 2011 Lee Kum Kee TVC
- 2013 Citibank: Credit card ad (Chinese: 信用卡ifc商場簽賬)

== Awards and nominations ==
=== Starhub TVB Awards ===
Year	Award	Drama	Role	Result
2017	Favourite TVB Supporting Actress	The No No Girl (全職沒女)	Muse Miu Sze (繆思)	Nominated

=== TVB Star Awards Malaysia ===
Year	Award	Drama	Role	Result
2015	Top 16 Favourite TVB Drama Characters	Raising the Bar (四個女仔三個BAR)	Brittany Fok Tsz-ying (霍紫凝)	Nominated
2017	Favourite TVB Most Improved Female Artiste	The No No Girl (全職沒女)	Muse Miu Sze (繆思)	Nominated
2017	Favourite TVB Supporting Actress	The No No Girl (全職沒女)	Muse Miu Sze (繆思)	Nominated
2017	Top 17 Favourite TVB Drama Characters	The No No Girl (全職沒女)	Muse Miu Sze (繆思)	Nominated

=== TVB Anniversary Awards ===
Year	Award	Drama	Role	Result
2015	Best Supporting Actress	Raising the Bar (四個女仔三個BAR)	Brittany Fok Tsz-ying (霍紫凝)	Nominated
2016	Best Supporting Actress	Blue Veins (殭)	Yuen Bing (阮冰)	Nominated
2018	Favourite TVB Actress in Malaysia	Life on the Line (跳躍生命線)	Luna Heung Moon-yuet (向滿月)	Nominated
2018	Favourite TVB Actress in Singapore	Life on the Line (跳躍生命線)	Luna Heung Moon-yuet (向滿月)	Nominated
2018	Best Supporting Actress	Life on the Line (跳躍生命線)	Luna Heung Moon-yuet (向滿月)	Nominated
2019	Best Supporting Actress	The Ghetto-Fabulous Lady (福爾摩師奶)	Sugar Ngai So-ka (魏素嘉)	Nominated
2020	Best Actress	Of Greed And Ants (黃金有罪)	Shui Man-ting (水敏婷)	Nominated
2020	Most Popular Female Character	Of Greed And Ants (黃金有罪)	Shui Man-ting (水敏婷)	Nominated
2020	Favourite TVB Actress in Malaysia	Of Greed And Ants (黃金有罪)	Shui Man-ting (水敏婷)	Nominated
2021	Most Improved Female Artiste	Beauty and the Boss, Shadow of Justice, Battle of the Seven Sisters	—N/a	Top 5
2021	Best Actress	Beauty and the Boss (愛美麗狂想曲)	Lee Siu-yong (李小勇)	Top 10
2021	Best Actress	Shadow of Justice (伙計辦大事)	Sheung Siu (常笑)	Nominated
2021	Most Popular Female Character	Beauty and the Boss (愛美麗狂想曲)	Lee Siu-yong (李小勇)	Nominated
2021	Most Popular Female Character	Shadow of Justice (伙計辦大事)	Sheung Siu (常笑)	Nominated
2021	Favourite TVB Actress in Malaysia	Beauty and the Boss (愛美麗狂想曲)	Lee Siu-yong (李小勇)	Nominated
2021	Favourite TVB Actress in Malaysia	Shadow of Justice (伙計辦大事)	Sheung Siu (常笑)	Nominated
2021	Most Popular Onscreen Partnership	Beauty and the Boss (with Edwin Siu)	—N/a	Nominated
2021	Most Popular Onscreen Partnership	Battle of the Seven Sisters (with Priscilla Wong, Rosina Lam, Samantha Ko, Kaman Kong, Venus Kwong)	—N/a	Nominated
2021	Best Dressed Female Artiste	—N/a	—N/a	Won
2022	Best Actress	Your Highness (痞子殿下)	Nap Hak Wan-yau (納克溫柔)	Top 5
2022	Best Actress	The War of Beauties (美麗戰場)	Chung Ka-Bo (鍾家寶)	Nominated
2022	Most Popular Female Character	Your Highness (痞子殿下)	Nap Hak Wan-yau (納克溫柔)	Top 10
2022	Most Popular Female Character	The War of Beauties (美麗戰場)	Chung Ka-Bo (鍾家寶)	Nominated
2022	Favourite TVB Actress in Malaysia	Your Highness (痞子殿下)	Nap Hak Wan-yau (納克溫柔)	Nominated
2022	Favourite TVB Actress in Malaysia	The War of Beauties (美麗戰場)	Chung Ka-Bo (鍾家寶)	Top 10
2022	Most Popular Onscreen Partnership	Your Highness (with Kalok Chow, JW Wong, Brian Chu, Jonathan Cheung)	—N/a	Won
2022	Most Popular Onscreen Partnership	The Beauty of War (with Moon Lau, Hera Chan)	—N/a	Nominated

=== People's Choice Television Awards ===
Year	Category	Work	Role	Result
2018	People’s Choice Best Supporting Actress	Life on the Line (跳躍生命線)	Luna Heung Moon-yuet (向滿月)	Top 5 (Ranked 4th)
2018	People’s Choice Most Improved Female Artiste	Life on the Line, Fun Abroad	—N/a	Top 5 (Ranked 4th)
2021	People’s Choice Most Improved Female Artiste	Beauty and the Boss, Shadow of Justice, Battle of the Seven Sisters	—N/a	Nominated
2021	People’s Choice Best Supporting Actress	Beauty and the Boss (愛美麗狂想去)	Lee Siu-yong (李小勇)	Nominated

=== AEG Entertainment Awards ===
Year	Category	Work	Result
2022	Favourite Actress	The Beauty of War (美麗戰場)	Won
2022	Best Couple (with Kalok Chow)	Your Highness (痞子殿下)	Won

=== Yahoo Asia Buzz Awards ===
Year	Category	Work	Result
2022	Television Female Artiste Award	—N/a	Won
2022	Popular Television Couple (with Moon Lau and Hera Chan)	The Beauty of War (美麗戰場)	Won
