= A General, a Scholar and a Eunuch =

Hong Kong television series

- Official poster
- Also known as: Time-Traveling Officials
- 超時空男臣
- Genre: Historical fiction, Science fiction, Comedy, Wuxia
- Created by: Hong Kong Television Broadcasts Limited
- Written by: Wong Wai-keung (head writer), Mak Sai-lung, Leung Tse-yin, Yim Lai-wah, Man Yu-han, Ngai Hong-yee, Gu Hin-lung
- Starring: Edwin Siu; Kristal Tin; Raymond Cho; Grace Wong; Matthew Ho; Rebecca Zhu; David Chiang; Tsui Wing; Joseph Lee; Willie Wai; Claire Yiu
- Theme music composer: Damon Chui
- Opening theme: "Praise for War" (戰勝吧) by Fred Cheng
- Ending theme: "木紋" (Wood Grain) by Denise Ho
- Country of origin: Hong Kong
- Original language: Cantonese
- No. of episodes: 32

Production
- Executive producer: Catherine Tsang
- Producer: Marco Law
- Production locations: Hong Kong, Foshan China
- Editor: Wong Wai-keung
- Camera setup: Multi camera
- Running time: 45 minutes
- Production company: TVB

Original release
- Network: TVB Jade
- Release: 17 July – 27 August 2017

A General, a Scholar and a Eunuch
- Traditional Chinese: 超時空男臣
- Literal meaning: "Time-Travelling Male Official"
Transcriptions
Standard Mandarin
- Hanyu Pinyin: chāo shí kōng nán chén
Yue: Cantonese
- Jyutping: ciu1 si4 hung1 naam4 san4

A General, a Scholar and a Eunuch (Traditional Chinese: 超時空男臣; literally "Time-Travelling Male Official") is a 2017 Hong Kong television costume historical, science fiction comedy drama produced by Marco Law for TVB, starring Edwin Siu, Kristal Tin, Raymond Cho, Grace Wong and Matthew Ho as the main cast. It premiered on Hong Kong's TVB Jade and Malaysia's Astro On Demand on July 17, 2017 airing Monday through Friday during its 8:30 to 9:30 pm timeslot and concluding August 27, 2017 with a total of 32 episodes.

A General, a Scholar and a Eunuch is a historical fiction comedy about three Ming dynasty imperial officials who accidentally travel to modern day Mainland China by accident while searching for the crown prince's missing wife. The three male leads are actual historical Chinese figures Yuan Chonghuan, Zuo Guangdou and Wei Zhongxian, however, the characters are portrayed fictitiously in the drama.

== Synopsis ==
General Yuen Sung-woon (Edwin Siu), Donglin Academy scholar Jor Gwong-dau (Raymond Cho), and eunuch Lee Jun-chung (Matthew Ho) are Ming Dynasty imperial officials that accidentally went through a time portal while escaping assassins during their mission of escorting the betrothal Crown Princess (Grace Wong). The three find themselves in modern-day Foshan China at an ancient filming set which confuses them from reality and fiction. They also meet film production manager Ng Siu-ha whom they mistake as a lazy court maid. Sister Ha befriends the three when they are unable to pay a restaurant bill, after she finds out the jade pendant Gwong-dau gave her as a token of appreciation is in fact a priceless Ming dynasty relic. Sister Ha modernizes the appearance of the three in an impoverish style and gives them work as film extras. She also gives them three new names. Sung-woon becomes Wan Tai-kwan, Gwong-dau becomes Fung Yat-bo and Jun-chung becomes Lee Siu-tung. When Jun-chung encounters popular female actress Sandy Wang Yi-san (Grace Wong) at the filming studio, he mistakes her as the Crown Princess. However, Sandy, who is a hypocritical person who pretends to care about her fans while secretly thinking they are idiots, believes the three are her fans. Sandy's manager prevents the three from communicating with her unless they join her fan club, which cost HK$3000 for each person. The three borrow the fan club entry fee from Sister Ha, but in order to pay her back, Sung-woon has to work as a cross-dressing stunt double.

Meanwhile, struggling restaurant owner Jackie Fung Wai-chi (Kristal Tin) from Hong Kong is also in Foshan to search for a new head chef at her restaurant since the current head chef suffers from Alzheimer and can't remember how to cook a single dish. When she is unable to find her intended prospect, she holds a cooking competition at a hotel banquet hall. Wanting to help pay off their debt, Jun-chung decides to join the cooking competition, but his confusion and as well as the faulty system of the elevator causes him to be late. When he arrives at the competition site, Jackie had left. Still determined to get hired, he cooks a dish, but Jackie's uncle shoos him away. When Jackie returns to the competition site, she recognizes Jun-chung's dish as the signature dish of her restaurant, but Jun-chung is nowhere to be found by then. Determined to find Jun-chung, she posts fliers all over the city looking for him. After a passerby tells Jackie that he recognizes the person on the flier, she arrives at the film studio just as the three beg Sister Ha to lend them money to go to Hong Kong after learning that Sandy is leaving Foshan for Hong Kong. Jackie offers to bring them to Hong Kong.

Jun-chung, not wanting to sign a long-term work contract with Jackie, refuses her offer of employment no matter how high a price she offers. In order to trick the three and especially Jun-chung, she lies that she and Sandy are close friends and that she will help them get in contact with her. When Jackie's father meets the three, he does not believe that Jun-chung/Siu-tung is the newly hired head chef due to his young age. Siu-tung proves everyone wrong when his cooking impresses a very important guest that their rival had brought to the restaurant. Soon, Siu-tung becomes a media darling and social media celebrity, with television stations lining up to have him as a guest.

Unhappy with their newfound success, Jackie's rival tries to lure Siu-tung to work for them with every means possible. Meanwhile, Tai-kwan has attracted the attention of a triad boss who causes trouble for the restaurant. Impressed by Tai-kwan's highly skilled martial arts, the triad boss tries to force Tai-kwan into joining his gang. Yat-bo, who has been absorbing all of modern technology and information, creates a believable lie that scares off the triad gang. When Sandy uses Yat-bo to ward off an unwanted suitor, he finds himself falling for her since he had a past romantic relationship with the Crown Princess during their actual timeline.

All seems fine when Jackie merges to become part of their rival company, but the true culprit who wants to ruin them and expose their secret of being sent from the past starts to emerge. While dealing with their current enemy, the three also face greater danger when a powerful enemy from the Ming Dynasty, who Tai-kwan is no match for, also travels to the future to hunt them down and bring their heads back to the Ming Dynasty.

== Ending ==
A General, a Scholar and a Eunuch ending was left inconclusive leading to speculation of a possible sequel.

Ending spoiler
During an elevator ride, Tai-kwan, Yat-bo, Siu-tung and Sandy emerge, finding that the future has been altered because the four of them were declared dead during the Ming Dynasty. When the four find out that Jackie's restaurant is going out of business, they head there, only to realize none of the Fong and Wan family members recognize them. Wai-kei, who was a university student, is now a delinquent triad gang member in the alternate future. Her uncle Wai-tai and aunt Yi-hung are a bickering married couple, with Wai-tai accusing his pregnant wife of having an affair with a delivery boy. Wai-tai, who now speaks with a country accent, also inherited the family restaurant and is the head chef. However, he is not a skilled cook and his many years behind the stove has left him balding with a bad, messy comb over to hide his bald spot. Aunt Yuk-fun is not as conservative as her original timeline self and is the lazy, sassy cashier at the restaurant. The patriarch of the family, Fung Tin, is crippled from head to toes and has suffered a crooked face for many years. To Siu-tung's surprise, Cat, whom he was dating in the original timeline, is married with two children to a cheating Ivan, who works as a taxi driver. When asked about Jackie, Fong Tin tells them that she left the family many years ago, working in sales in Central, Hong Kong, and hardly visits or cares about them. The alternate Jackie is a vain, selfish, and rude person who even refuses to give up her seat on the bus to a heavily pregnant woman when kindly asked.

Yat-bo gets a hold of a history book and finds out that with the four of them declared dead, history has also changed, with the Ming Dynasty continuing longer than it originally did. In order to correct the future and prevent the alternate future from happening, the four prepare to travel back to the Ming Dynasty.

== Cast ==
=== Ming dynasty ===
- Edwin Siu as Yuen Sung-woon (袁崇煥 later named Wan Tai-kwan 雲大軍)

A highly skilled martial arts fighter, high ranking general from the Ming Dynasty. He was tasked with leading the army on escorting the betrothal Crown Princess. He and Jackie had an unpleasant first encounter since he thought kissing people on the mouth resolves all disputes and arguments from what he had seen in an online drama clip. The two later fall in love after going through many hardships together.

- Grace Wong as Sandy Wong Yi-san / Kwok Sin (汪以珊 / 郭倩)

The girl chosen to be married to the Crown Prince. In the present she is a popular actress who is two-faced and insensitive. Her ruthless gold-digging ways and unreasonable requests cause her to lose her work contracts and company management. It is later revealed that Sandy is the actual Princess who had arrived at the present before the three.

- Raymond Cho as Jor Gwong Dau (左光斗 later named Fung Yat-bo 馮一波)

A Ming Dynasty scholar who is considered a genius due to his amazing memory and mathematical skills. After time-travelling, he is the first of the three to learn and be able to understand modern technology. During the Ming Dynasty he had a romantic relationship with the Crown Princess (before she was chosen) whom he was forbidden to love due to their social standing, in the present time he finds himself falling in love with Sandy after she uses him to ward off an unwanted suitor.

- Matthew Ho as Lee Jun-chong (李進忠 later named Lee Siu-tung 李小冬)

A eunuch from the Ming Dynasty. He is the youngest and most innocent of the three, and a highly skilled cook in palace cuisine. It's because of his skills that Jackie desperately lures the three to Hong Kong to work for her. His appearance and young age leaves others in disbelief that he is a highly skilled chef. His kindness leads Cat to make him her boyfriend.

- Timothy Cheng as Cheung Sing (張誠)

Leader of the Eastern Gate eunuchs. Members of his eunuch household were executed when the Crown Prince had a nightmare involving the eunuchs with the last name Ngai (魏). Has a high influence over the emperor and Crown Prince while Yuen Sung-woon, Jor Gwong-dau time travelled to the future.

- Bob Cheung as Chu Sheung-lok (朱常洛)

Crown Prince of Ming Dynasty.

=== Fung & Wan family ===
- David Chiang as Fong Tin (方天)

Jackie, Cat and Kei's widowed father. Yuk-fun's older brother. He is always bickering with his brother-in-law Wai-tai, as the two argue over who is the boss of the restaurant. He believes he is the boss since his father in-law, who founded the restaurant, left it to his wife, and then his deceased wife left it to Jackie. He is also bitter over Chu Kwok-fung's success and fortune.

- Kristal Tin as Jackie Fong Wai-chi (方惠芝)

Fong Tin's oldest daughter. Cat and Kei's older sister. Wai-tai, Yi-hung and Yuk-fun's niece. She is the head of the family restaurant since her later mother left it to her. In order to prevent her family's bickering she often covers for family members wrongdoing. Due to the current state of the head chef, she heads to Foshan to find a new chef in order to save the family restaurant. After tasting Siu-tung's cooking, she uses desperate measures to lure the three to Hong Kong to work for her.

- Rebecca Zhu as Catherine (Cat) Fong Wai-ling (方惠玲)

Fong Tin's second daughter. She becomes involved with Siu-tung, not knowing he is a eunuch.

- Vicky Chan as Fong Wai-kei (方惠琪)

Fong Tin's youngest daughter.

- Willie Wai as Wan Wai-tai (溫偉泰)

Brother-in-law of the Fongs. Uses his position in the family restaurant for personal gains, but is given a second chance by Jackie to keep the family together.

- Rachel Kan as Yue Yi-hung (余綺虹)

Sister-in-law of the Fongs. Wan Wai-tai's wife.

- LuLu Kai as Fong Yuk-fun (方玉芬)

Fong Tin's younger sister.

- Burmie Wong as Wan Suet-lin (溫雪蓮)

Fong Tin's deceased wife.

=== Chu family ===
- Joseph Lee as Chu Kwok-fung (朱國豐)
- Claire Yiu as Gillian Chu-Kwok Fung-kiu (朱郭鳳嬌)
- Tsui Wing as Samuel Cheuk Wah (卓華)
- James Ng as Ivan Chu Ka-hin (朱家軒)
- Gloria Tang as Chu Ka-yiu (朱家瑤)
- Yiub Cheng as Chu Ka-bou (朱家寶)

=== Extended cast ===
- Harriet Yeung as Ng Siu Ha (吳笑霞)
- Ram Chiang as security guard captain
- Dickson Lee as Terry Lam Tak-lei (林得利)
- Doris Chow as Ceci Yu Sin-ci
- Sin Ho-ying as Ding Hau (丁孝)
- Tammy Ou-Yang as Baby Tse Sum-yi
- Brian Burrell as a missionary during the Ming dynasty
- Jan Tse as a concubine during the Ming dynasty
- Jessica Kan as Wong Yi-San (汪以珊)

== Development and production ==
- The costume fitting ceremony was held on October 4, 2016 12:30 pm at Tseung Kwan O TVB City Studio One Common Room.
- The blessing ceremony was held on October 31, 2015 3:00 pm at Tseung Kwan O TVB City Studio.
- Filming took place from October 2016 till February 2017, on location in Hong Kong and Foshan China.
- Rosina Lam was originally cast as the Princess character, but turned it down due to her busy personal schedule. Grace Wong was then cast in the part.

== Viewership Ratings ==
#	Timeslot (HKT)	Week	Episode(s)	Average points	Peaking points
1	Mon – Fri (8:30-9:30 pm); 20:30–21:30	17 – 21 Jul 2017	1 — 5	24.5	27.0
2	Mon – Fri (8:30-9:30 pm); 20:30–21:30	24 – 28 Jul 2017	6 — 10	25.8	29.0
3	Mon – Fri (8:30-9:30 pm); 20:30–21:30	31 Jul – 04 Aug 2017	11 — 15	26.8	30.0
4	Mon – Fri (8:30-9:30 pm); 20:30–21:30	07 – 11 Aug 2017	16 — 20	26.5	30.0
5	Mon – Fri (8:30-9:30 pm); 20:30–21:30	14 – 18 Aug 2017	21 — 25	26.6	27.8
6	Mon – Fri (8:30-9:30 pm); 20:30–21:30	21 – 27 Aug 2017	26 — 30	29.4	32.7
Total average				27	33

== Awards and nominations ==
Association	Category	Nominee	Result
StarHub TVB Awards	My Favourite TVB Drama		Nominated
StarHub TVB Awards	My Favourite TVB Actress	Grace Wong	Nominated
StarHub TVB Awards	My Favourite TVB Actor	Edwin Siu	Nominated
StarHub TVB Awards	My Favourite TVB Actor	Matthew Ho	Nominated
StarHub TVB Awards	My Favourite TVB Actor	Raymond Cho	Nominated
StarHub TVB Awards	My Favourite TVB Supporting Actress	Rebecca Zhu	Nominated
StarHub TVB Awards	My Favourite TVB Female TV Characters	Kristal Tin	Won
StarHub TVB Awards	My Favourite TVB Female TV Characters	Grace Wong	Nominated
StarHub TVB Awards	My Favourite TVB Female TV Characters	Rebecca Zhu	Nominated
StarHub TVB Awards	My Favourite TVB Male TV Characters	Raymond Cho	Won
StarHub TVB Awards	My Favourite TVB Male TV Characters	Edwin Siu	Won
StarHub TVB Awards	My Favourite TVB Male TV Characters	Matthew Ho	Nominated
StarHub TVB Awards	My Favourite TVB On-Screen Couple	Raymond Cho and Grace Wong	Nominated
StarHub TVB Awards	My Favourite TVB On-Screen Couple	Matthew Ho and Rebecca Zhu	Nominated
StarHub TVB Awards	Most Improved TVB Artiste	Matthew Ho	Won
TVB Star Awards Malaysia	My Favourite TVB Drama Series		Nominated
TVB Star Awards Malaysia	My Favourite TVB Actor in a Leading Role	Edwin Siu	Nominated
TVB Star Awards Malaysia	My Favourite TVB Actor in a Leading Role	Matthew Ho	Nominated
TVB Star Awards Malaysia	My Favourite TVB Actor in a Leading Role	Raymond Cho	Nominated
TVB Star Awards Malaysia	Best Supporting Actress	Rebecca Zhu	Nominated
TVB Star Awards Malaysia	My Favourite TVB Most Improved Actor	Matthew Ho	Won
TVB Star Awards Malaysia	My Favourite TVB Most Improved Actor	James Ng	Nominated
TVB Star Awards Malaysia	My Favourite TVB Most Improved Actress	Gloria Tang	Nominated
TVB Star Awards Malaysia	My Favourite TVB On-Screen Couple	Edwin Siu and Kristal Tin	Nominated
TVB Star Awards Malaysia	My Favourite TVB Drama Characters	Edwin Siu	Won
TVB Star Awards Malaysia	My Favourite TVB Drama Characters	Kristal Tin	Won
TVB Star Awards Malaysia	My Favourite TVB Drama Characters	Raymond Cho	Won
TVB Star Awards Malaysia	My Favourite TVB Drama Characters	Rebecca Zhu	Won
TVB Anniversary Awards	Best Drama		Nominated
TVB Anniversary Awards	Best Actor	Raymond Cho	Nominated
TVB Anniversary Awards	Best Actor	Edwin Siu	Nominated
TVB Anniversary Awards	Best Supporting Actor	Timothy Cheng	Nominated
TVB Anniversary Awards	Best Supporting Actor	David Chiang	Nominated
TVB Anniversary Awards	Best Supporting Actress	Rebecca Zhu	Won
TVB Anniversary Awards	Best Supporting Actress	Grace Wong	Nominated
TVB Anniversary Awards	Best Supporting Actress	Harriet Yeung	Nominated
TVB Anniversary Awards	Most Popular Male Character	Raymond Cho	Nominated
TVB Anniversary Awards	Most Popular Male Character	Edwin Siu	Nominated
TVB Anniversary Awards	Most Popular Female Character	Rebecca Zhu	Nominated
TVB Anniversary Awards	Most Improved Male Artiste	Matthew Ho	Nominated
TVB Anniversary Awards	Most Improved Female Artiste	Rebecca Zhu	Nominated
TVB Anniversary Awards	Most Popular Drama Theme Song	"戰勝吧" (Praise for War) by Fred Cheng	Nominated
TVB Anniversary Awards	Most Popular On-Screen Partnership	Edwin Siu, Raymond Cho, and Matthew Ho	Won
