= Story of Zom-B =

2022 Hong Kong television series

- Also known as: 食腦喪Ｂ
- Genre: Supernatural; Fantasy; Comedy
- Written by: Kwan Chung-ling; Sin Chui-ching; Lee Ho
- Directed by: Au Chun-yip; Wong Sze-yuen; Cheung Wing-fai; Chan Hon-sing
- Starring: Matthew Ho; Kaman Kong
- Opening theme: "Great Ambition (大志)" by Deep Ng
- Country of origin: Hong Kong
- Original language: Cantonese
- No. of episodes: 20

Production
- Producer: Ng Koon-yu
- Production location: Hong Kong
- Running time: 43 minutes
- Production company: TVB

Original release
- Network: TVB Jade; myTV Super
- Release: 18 April – 13 May 2022

Story of Zom-B (Chinese: 食腦喪Ｂ; lit. 'Brain-Eating Zom-B') is a Hong Kong fantasy-comedy television series produced by TVB. The 20-episode series was first available for streaming on myTV Super in July 2021 before airing on TVB Jade from 18 April to 13 May 2022. Starring Matthew Ho, Kaman Kong, Arnold Kwok, and Milkson Fong, the series follows a human-turned-zombie as he navigates his new reality while confronting family secrets, budding romance, and personal growth.

== Cast ==
- Matthew Ho as Yu Yeung-kwong, a carefree man who becomes a brain-eating zombie with the ability to absorb memories
- Kaman Kong as Mok Siu-chun, a hot-tempered woman who later develops feelings for Yeung-kwong.
- Arnold Kwok as Koo Tak-ming, a forensic intern who studies Yeung-kwong's condition and helps him control his zombie instincts.
- Milkson Fong as Warren, an amateur Taoist priest who assists Tak-ming with Yeung-kwong's zombie crisis.
- Ashley Chu as Yu San-hei, Yeung-kwong's lawyer elder sister who tries to protect the family.
- Iris Lam as Yu Man-ha, Yeung-kwong's younger sister who helps at the family's hot pot restaurant.
- Suet Nei as Pak Ma San-kan, Yeung-kwong's grandmother who runs the family hot pot restaurant.
- Ram Chiang as Yu Gwo / Yu Cheung-kim, the Yu family's mysterious grand-uncle who knows their hidden past.
- Stephanie Che as Man Chau (Sarah), Siu-chun's mother and a mahjong parlour owner.
- Mark Ma as Shentu Ching-fai, a restaurant worker secretly linked to the zombie research.
- Hera Chan as Leung Sin-tung (Bella), Yeung-kwong's childhood crush.
- Jackson Lai as Scott, a scientist whose research to cure his son triggers the zombie outbreak.

== Plot ==
The series follows Yu Yeung-kwong (Matthew Ho), the heir to a hotpot restaurant, who becomes infected with a zombie virus following an accident. To sustain himself, he must consume human brains, temporarily acquiring the memories, skills, and personality traits of the deceased. His path crosses with Mok Siu-chun (Kaman Kong), the heiress to a mahjong parlor, who inadvertently pushes him off a bridge and later becomes one of the few people aware of his condition. With assistance from forensic intern Koo Tak-ming (Arnold Kwok) and Taoist Warren (Milkson Fong), Yeung-kwong deals with family tensions at the restaurant, romantic entanglements, an impostor named Yu Gwo (Ram Chiang) posing as a relative, and dangers posed by a secretive Japanese organization linked to new chef Shentu Ching-fai (Mark Ma).

As events unfold, the accumulation of absorbed memories increasingly affects Yeung-kwong's mental health, leading to memory loss, hallucinations, and episodes of diminished self-control. Efforts to find a cure coincide with escalating threats, including attacks on Siu-chun and disappearances among the homeless population, culminating in a full zombie outbreak across Hong Kong. Following a major clash with zombies in an abandoned factory, Yeung-kwong leaves in order to protect his family from further harm. Hong Kong Island is subsequently quarantined as a restricted area, with surviving residents preparing to defend themselves against the spreading infection.

Yeung-kwong later returns, and during a confrontation it is revealed that his saliva functions as a vaccine capable of reversing the zombie transformation and restoring infected individuals to human form. He uses it to cure others, leading to the containment of the outbreak. However, Yeung-kwong and other infected individuals suffer amnesia as a side effect, causing him to forget his relationship with Siu-chun. Despite this, the two eventually reunite and begin their relationship anew.

== Production ==
The series was produced by Ng Koon-yu, with script supervision by Kwan Chung-ling, Sin Chui-ching, and Lee Ho, and directed by a team of directors.

== Music ==
Track Listing
| No. | Title | Lyrics | Music | Artist(s) | Length |
|---|---|---|---|---|---|
| 1. | "Great Ambition (大志)" | Hayes Yeung | Dominic Chu | Deep Ng | 3:10 |
| 2. | "Great Ambition (大志) (2nd version)" | Hayes Yeung | Dominic Chu | Matthew Ho, Arnold Kwok, Milkson Fong | 3:11 |

== Ratings and reception ==
| Week | Episodes | Airing dates | Ratings (Note: According to Hong Kong's TV rating system, each rating point represents approximately 64,670 viewers.) | Ref. |
|---|---|---|---|---|
| 1 | 1 – 5 | 18–22 April 2022 | 18.2 points | |
| 2 | 6 – 10 | 25–29 April 2022 | 16.6 points | |
| 3 | 11 – 15 | 2–6 May 2022 | 15.8 points | |
| 4 | 16 – 20 | 9–13 May 2022 | 15.5 points | |

== Cast controversy ==
During the filming of Story of Zom-B in 2020, actors Ashley Chu and the married actor Jackson Lai were involved in a widely reported personal scandal, which drew media attention and public scrutiny. Both later issued apologies, and Lai publicly acknowledged a brief relationship with Chu. The controversy led TVB to temporarily shelve the series before its eventual streaming release in 2021 and free-to-air broadcast in 2022.
