= Used Good (TV series) =

2021–2022 Hong Kong television series

- Also known as: 異搜店
- Genre: Drama; Family; Supernatural
- Written by: Cheung Sai-cheung
- Directed by: Lam Wai-ching; Au Chun-yip; Leung Kai-ching; Cheung Wing-fai; So Ka-lok
- Starring: Matthew Ho; Hera Chan; James Ng
- Opening theme: "How Time Flies (光陰飛逝時)" by Jinny Ng
- Country of origin: Hong Kong
- Original language: Cantonese
- No. of episodes: 20

Production
- Producer: Leung Yiu-kin
- Production location: Hong Kong
- Running time: 43 minutes
- Production company: TVB

Original release
- Network: TVB Jade; myTV Super
- Release: 20 December 2021 – 14 January 2022

Used Good (Chinese: 異搜店; lit. 'Paranormal Shop') is a Hong Kong drama series produced by TVB. The 20-episode series aired from 20 December 2021 to 14 January 2022. It follows a young man who can receive visions from old objects. The series blends mystery, supernatural elements, and family drama, and stars Matthew Ho, Hera Chan, and James Ng in the lead roles.

== Cast ==
- Matthew Ho as Wai Tak-shun, a young man with the unique ability to receive fragmented visions from old objects, which he uses to uncover buried secrets and untangle people's pasts.
- Hera Chan as Joey Fung Cho-yi, the eco-minded daughter of a second-hand shop owner with a strong belief in sustainability and the reuse of discarded items.
- James Ng as Andy Lee Chi-hang, Joey's boyfriend and a doctor.
- Eyvonne Lam as Tse Mei-cheung, Tak-shun's mother.
- Raymond Cho as Tse Tim-sing, Tak-shun's uncle.
- Eric Cheng as Wai King-yan, Tak-shun's deceased father.
- Lee Shing-cheong as Fung Lap-tong, Joey's father and the owner of the second-hand shop.
- Eva Lai as Ho Choi-ha, Joey's mother.
- Maverick Mak as Fung Cho-fai, Joey's older brother.
- Strawberry Yeung as Ng Yuk-ling, Andy's mother and the owner of a financial investment company.

== Plot ==
The story follows Wai Tak-shun (Matthew Ho), a young man who can receive visions from old objects, and Joey Fung (Hera Chan), the eco-minded daughter of a second-hand shop owner. Set in Lap Tong Kee, the series explores mysterious and supernatural events linked to the store's inventory. Tak-shun and Joey investigate haunted items, including a rooster deity statue, a mysterious laptop, and a set of cursed golf clubs, uncovering hidden family secrets, unresolved past traumas, and long-buried truths. Guided by visions, they help reunite estranged families, solve unexplained incidents, and confront those exploiting others for personal gain. In the finale, Tak-shun uncovers the truth behind his father's death while the store suffers a devastating fire, highlighting the series' themes of family, redemption, and the hidden histories within everyday objects.

== Production ==
The series was produced by Leung Yiu-kin and script supervised by Cheung Sai-cheung, with direction handled by a rotating team.

== Music ==
Track Listing
No.	Title	Lyrics	Music	Artist(s)	Length
1.	"How Time Flies (光陰飛逝時)"	Hayes Yeung	Damon Chui	Jinny Ng	3:24

== Ratings and reception ==
A writer from Oriental Daily News Malaysia wrote that the series received generally positive feedback and solid ratings for its grounded family and emotional scenes, but its fantasy-suspense elements were less prominent despite strong twists and standout performances from the cast. The drama's final week averaged 25.5 rating points (1.67 million viewers), while the finale peaked at 28 points, reaching 1.82 million viewers.

Week	Episodes	Airing dates	Ratings (Note: According to Hong Kong's TV rating system, each rating point represents approximately 64,670 viewers.)		Ref.
Week	Episodes	Airing dates	Cross-platform peak ratings	Viewership	Ref.
1	1 – 5	20–24 December 2021	19 points		
2	6 – 10	27–31 December 2021	19.7 points		
3	11 – 15	3–7 January 2022	22.3 points		
4	16 – 20	10–14 January 2022	25.5 points	1.67 million	
