= Life on the Line (TV series) =

- Poster
- 跳躍生命線
- Genre: Medical drama
- Created by: Dave Fong
- Written by: Sin Tsui-ching
- Starring: Joe Ma; Matthew Ho; Moon Lau; Jeannie Chan; Kelly Cheung; Joey Law; Ali Lee; Lee Shing-cheong; Willie Wai; Pinky Cheung; Bob Cheung; Arnold Kwok
- Opening theme: 無畏的肩膊 by Fred Cheng
- Ending theme: 從未說起 by Hana Kuk 但願人長久 by Hana Kuk 只怕不够时间看你白头 by Bob Cheung & Gladys Li
- Country of origin: Hong Kong
- Original language: Cantonese
- No. of episodes: 25

Production
- Producer: Dave Fong
- Production location: Hong Kong
- Running time: approx. 43 min
- Production company: Television Broadcasts Limited

Original release
- Network: TVB Jade
- Release: 8 October – 9 November 2018

Related
- Story of Yanxi Palace; Fist Fight

Life on the Line (Chinese: 跳躍生命線) is a 2018 medical drama produced by TVB starring Joe Ma, Matthew Ho and Moon Lau as the main leads.

The story mainly focuses on the career of ambulance personnel, as well as the fight against time in emergency situations. The show received full support from the Hong Kong Fire Services Department which assisted in filming.

== Plot ==
Following the death of his wife, Cheung Wai-sum (Ali Lee) in a hit and run accident, Principal Ambulanceman Mak Choi-tin (Joe Ma) lives with his only daughter Mak Lok-yee (Bianca Chan), sister Mak Oi-fah (Pinky Cheung) and sister-in-law Cheung Ho-kei (Moon Lau). Young and hopeful, subordinate Cheuk Ka-kit (Matthew Ho) is impulsive and clashes with Choi-tin's life. In addition, Tam Ka-chun (Joey Law), the superior of the trainee ambulance officer, pursues perfection and picks on Ka-kit, causing the pressure on the team to greatly increase. Being the middleman, Choi-tin works hard and strives to maintain the unity and cooperation spirit between the team members. He also hopes to cultivate outstanding ambulance elites, rescuing more precious lives in challenging situations...

== Cast ==
=== Cheung Sha Wan Ambulance Depot ===
Cast	Role	Description
Jimmy Au 歐瑞偉	Wong Hoi 王海	王Sir、阿海: Senior Ambulance Officer (in charge of Cheung Sha Wan Ambulance Depot); In love with Mak Oi Fa
King Lam 林景程	Chan Yung 陳勇	陳Sir: Ambulance Officer
Joey Law 羅天宇	Tam Ka Chun 譚家俊	阿俊、Dave、譚Sir、俊仔: Probation Ambulance Officer, RRV Driver, full younger brother of Cheuk Ka Kit, Changed last name
Joe Ma 馬德鐘	Mak Chay Tin 麥在田	麥Sir、在哥、阿在: Principal Ambulanceman and team leader
Timothy Cheng 鄭子誠	Ying Fung 邢峰	邢Sir、黑摩利、阿峰: FASA Instructor (Principal Ambulanceman) and deployed to Cheung Sha Wan in episode 25
Moon Lau 劉佩玥	Cheung Ho Kei 章可祈	Tanya、祈祈、祈姐: Senior Ambulancewoman; Motorcycle paramedics
Willie Wai 韋家雄	Ko Hang Yan 高行仁	高人、仁哥、阿仁: Senior Ambulanceman; In love with Yau Ji Nam
Glen Lee 李霖恩	Seung Long Tin 常朗天	天王、天哥: Senior Ambulanceman
Amigo Choi 崔建邦	Law Ying Kai 羅應佳	阿B: Ambulance team member; Son of Ko Chung Foon
Calvin Chan 陳偉洪	Ju Kwok Wing 余國榮	Hulk: Ambulance team member; Son of junkie
Matthew Ho 何廣沛	Cheuk Ka Kit 卓家傑	傑仔: Ambulance team member; Deployed to Cheung Sha Wan in episode 8; full Older brother of Tam Ka Chun
Bob Cheung 張彥博	Lui Kim Hung 呂劍雄	雄姐: Ambulance team member; Deployed to Cheung Sha Wan in episode 8; In love with Fong Ching; Died in episode 20
Arnold Kwok 郭子豪	Luk Ho Yin 陸昊然	六號: Ambulance team member; Deployed to Cheung Sha Wan in episode 16; Returned to the US to study medicine
Mimi Chu 朱咪咪	Ko Chung Foon 高仲歡	Station canteen operator; Mother of Law Ying Kai; Has dementia

=== Fire and Ambulance Services Academy (FASA) ===
Cast	Role	Description
Jimmy Au 歐瑞偉	Wong Hoi 王海	See Cheung Sha Wan Ambulance Depot
Sin Ho-Ying 冼灝英	Fong Chi Chiu 方志釗	方Sir: Ambulance officer; FASA instructor
Timothy Cheng 鄭子誠	Ying Fung 邢峰	邢Sir、黑摩利、阿峰: Principal ambulanceman; FASA instructor
Matthew Ho 何廣沛	Cheuk Ka Kit 卓家傑	A283 member
Bob Cheung 張彥博	Lui Kim Hung 呂劍雄	A283 member
Arnold Kwok 郭子豪	Luk Ho Yin 陸昊然	A283 member

=== Mak family ===
Cast	Role	Description
Pinky Cheung 張文慈	Mak Oi Fa 麥愛花	Diana、阿花: KOL online celebrity; Elder sister of Mak Choi Tin; In love with Wong Hoi
Joe Ma 馬德鐘	Mak Choi Tin 麥在田	Widower of Cheung Wai Sum; Father of Mak Lok Yee; In love with Man Fai
Ali Lee 李佳芯	Cheung Wai Sum 章蕙芯	阿芯: Wife of Mak Choi Tin; Elder sister of Cheung Ho Kei; Mother of Mak Lok Yee; Died in a hit and run accident 10 years ago
Moon Lau 劉佩玥	Cheung Ho Kei 章可祈	Tanya、祈祈、祈姐、阿祈: Sister-in-law of Mak Choi Tin; In love with Cheuk Ka Kit
Bianca Chan 陳偲穎	Mak Lok Yee 麥諾兒	Daughter of Mak Choi Tin and Cheung Wai Sum

=== Cheuk family ===
Cast	Role	Description
Lee Shing-cheong 李成昌	Cheuk Kau 卓裘	裘叔、裘哥: Ex-husband of Jam Siu Dip; Father of Cheuk Ka Kit and Tam Ka Chun; Partner of "Snooker" snack shop with Yau Ji Nam
Susan Tse 謝雪心	Jam Siu Dip 湛小蝶	Ex-wife of Cheuk Kau; Immigrated to the US with Tam Ka Chun; Mother of Cheuk Ka Kit and Tam Ka Chun
Matthew Ho 何廣沛	Cheuk Ka Kit 卓家傑	Long-lost brother of Tam Ka Chun, later reconciled; In love with Cheung Ho Kei
Joey Law 羅天宇	Tam Ka Chun 譚家俊	Long-lost brother of Cheuk Ka Kit, later reconciled; In love with Heung Moon Yuet

=== Heung family ===
Cast	Role	Description
Law Lan 羅蘭	Lei Ying Oi 李英愛	愛姐: Grandmother of Heung Moon Yuet
Jeannie Chan 陳瀅	Heung Moon Yuet 向滿月	Luna、滿月: Emergency room nurse; In love with Tam Ka Chun

=== Other cast ===
Cast	Role	Description
Kelly Cheung 張曦雯	Man Fai 文暉	Mandy、Man: Car mechanic/dance instructor; In love with Mak Choi Tin
Griselda Yeung 楊卓娜	Yau Ji Nam 游子嵐	阿嵐、嵐姐: In love with Ko Hang Yan; Partner of "Snooker" snack shop with Cheuk Kau
Law Lok-lam 羅樂林	Jeung Si Chung 蔣世聰	聰叔: Woodworking Workshop owner; Retired ambulanceman
Gladys Li 李靖筠	Fong Ching 況晴	River: Woodworking Workshop worker; In love with Lui Kim Hung
William Chak 翟威廉	Hong 康	Angus: Ex-boyfriend of Cheung Ho Kei
Savio Tsang 曾偉權	Ho Wing Lun 何詠倫	Blamed Mak Chay Tin for his son's death; Committed suicide in episode 24

== Music ==
Title	Type'	Composer	Lyrics	Arranger	Producer(s)	Performer
無畏的肩膊	Opening theme	Alan Cheung	Hayes Yeung	Alan Cheung	Herman Ho; Joseph Wei	Fred Cheng
從未說起	Ending theme	Alan Cheung	Sandy Chang	Johnny Yim	Herman Ho; Joseph Wei	Hana Kuk
但願人長久	Interlude	Lowell Lo	Susan Tang	Dominic Chu	Herman Ho; Dominic Chu	Hana Kuk

== Awards and nominations ==
=== TVB Anniversary Awards 2018 ===
Category	Nominee(s)	Result
Best Drama	—N/a	Won
Best Actor	Joe Ma	Won
Best Actor	Matthew Ho	Nominated
Best Actress	Moon Lau	Nominated
Best Supporting Actor	Joey Law	Nominated
Best Supporting Actor	Arnold Kwok	Nominated
Best Supporting Actor	Bob Cheung	Top 5
Best Supporting Actress	Jeannie Chan	Nominated
Best Supporting Actress	Kelly Cheung	Top 5
Best Supporting Actress	Pinky Cheung	Nominated
Most Popular Male Character	Joe Ma as Mak Choi-tin	Top 5
Most Popular Male Character	Matthew Ho as Cheuk Ka-kit	Nominated
Most Popular Female Character	Kelly Cheung as Man Fai	Nominated
Most Improved Male Artiste	Matthew Ho	Won
Most Improved Female Artiste	Kelly Cheung	Nominated
Most Popular Onscreen Partnership	Matthew Ho, Joey Law, Bob Cheung and Arnold Kwok	Nominated
Most Popular Drama Theme Song	Fearless (無畏的肩膊) by Fred Cheng	Nominated
Most Popular Drama Theme Song	Never Said (從未說起) by Hana Kuk	Nominated
Most Popular Drama Theme Song	Last Forever (但願人長久) by Hana Kuk	Won
Favourite TVB Actor in Malaysia	Joe Ma	Nominated
Favourite TVB Actor in Malaysia	Matthew Ho	Nominated
Favourite TVB Actress in Malaysia	Moon Lau	Nominated
Favourite TVB Actress in Malaysia	Jeannie Chan	Nominated
Favourite TVB Actress in Malaysia	Kelly Cheung	Nominated

=== People’s Choice Television Awards 2018 ===
Category	Nominee(s)	Result
People’s Choice Best Drama	—N/a	Top 5 (Ranked 3rd)
People’s Choice Best Script	—N/a	Top 5 (Ranked 3rd)
People’s Choice Best Actor	Joe Ma as Mak Choi-tin	Won
People’s Choice Best Supporting Actor	Bob Cheung as Lui Kim-hung	Top 5 (Ranked 2nd)
People’s Choice Best Supporting Actress	Jeannie Chan as Heung Moon-yuet	Top 5 (Ranked 4th)
People’s Choice Best Supporting Actress	Pinky Cheung as Mak Oi-fa	Top 5 (Ranked 5th)
People’s Choice Most Improved Male Artiste	Bob Cheung as Lui Kim-hung	Top 5 (Ranked 2nd)
People’s Choice Most Improved Male Artiste	Arnold Kwok as Luk Ho-yin	Top 5 (Ranked 5th)
People’s Choice Most Improved Female Artiste	Moon Lau	Top 5 (Ranked 3rd)
People’s Choice Most Improved Female Artiste	Jeannie Chan	Top 5 (Ranked 4th)
People’s Choice Most Improved Female Artiste	Kelly Cheung	Top 5 (Ranked 5th)
Best TV Drama Theme Song	Last Forever (但願人長久) by Hana Kuk	Top 5 (Ranked 2nd)

== Viewership ratings ==
#	Timeslot (HKT)	Week	Episode(s)	Average points
1	Mon – Fri 20:30	8–12 October 2018	1 — 5	26.9
2	Mon – Fri 20:30	15–19 October 2018	6 — 10	29.8
3	Mon – Fri 20:30	22–26 October 2018	11 — 15	29.3
4	Mon – Fri 20:30	29 October – 2 November 2018	16 — 20	29.3
5	Mon – Fri 20:30	5–9 November 2018	21 — 25	31.1
Total average	Mon – Fri 20:30			29.3

== International broadcast ==
Network(s)/Station(s)	Series premiere		Title
China	Youku	October 8, 2018 – November 9, 2018 (VIP updates an episode every Monday to Friday at 20:30)	跳躍生命線 (Life on the Line; lit: )
Hong Kong; Macau	TVB, TVB Jade, myTV SUPER	October 8, 2018 – November 9, 2018 (Monday to Friday 20:30)	跳躍生命線 (Life on the Line; lit: )
Malaysia	Astro AOD	October 8, 2018 – November 9, 2018 (Monday to Friday 20:30)	跳躍生命線 (Life on the Line; lit: )
Singapore	Hub Drama First	October 8, 2018 – November 9, 2018 (Monday to Friday 20:30)	跳躍生命線 (Life on the Line; lit: )
Australia	TVBJ (Australia)	October 9, 2018 – November 10, 2018 (Tuesday to Saturday 20:30-21:30)	Life on the Line ( ; lit: )
Thailand	Channel 3 (33)	November 17, 2020 - December 18, 2020 (Every night Monday-Friday afternoon 3:43-04.20, and Saturday-Sunday afternoon 2:48-3.33, 3.43-4.20)	Life on the Line สายด่วนกู้ชีพ ( ; lit: )
