= The Beauty of War =

2022 Hong Kong television series

- Also known as: 美麗戰場
- Genre: Drama; Romance
- Written by: Patrick Kong
- Directed by: Patrick Kong
- Starring: Jeannie Chan; Moon Lau; Hera Chan; Angel Chiang; Joel Chan; Alex Fong
- Opening theme: "Beautiful Battlefield (美麗戰場)" by JW
- Country of origin: Hong Kong
- Original language: Cantonese
- No. of episodes: 20

Production
- Producer: Patrick Kong
- Production location: Hong Kong
- Running time: 43 minutes
- Production company: TVB

Original release
- Network: TVB Jade; myTV Super
- Release: 3 October – 28 October 2022

The Beauty of War (Chinese: 美麗戰場) is a Hong Kong drama series produced by TVB, with Patrick Kong serving as producer, screenwriter, and director. The 20-episode series premiered on 3 October and concluded on 28 October 2022. It follows three close friends whose sister-like bond begins to unravel after graduation as they navigate life, ambition, romance, and rivalry. Starring Jeannie Chan, Moon Lau, Hera Chan, Angel Chiang, Joel Chan, and Alex Fong, the series achieved strong viewership despite mixed reviews, with praise for Angel Chiang's performance and criticism of its open ending and certain plot and character developments.

== Cast ==
- Jeannie Chan as Chung Ka-po (Michelle), one of three best friends/sisters; evolves from innocent to hardened, the "black rose."
- Moon Lau as Lee Ching-yee (Joey), the "cactus" sister; upright and tough, later conflicts with Ka-po.
- Hera Chan as Lam Siu-mei, the "sunflower" sister; pure and gentle.
- Angel Chiang as Chung Ka-kei (Katy), Ka-po's stepsister; the "Venus flytrap," fierce and seductive.
- Joel Chan as Wong Yat-yin (Kevin), manager who recruits Ka-po; skilled at shaping careers.
- Alex Fong as Pong Chun-yu (Alex), tycoon's son; Ka-po's husband.
- Aska Cheung as Au Ka-ming, Ka-po's first love
- Karl Ting as Ching Yu-chun, Siu-mei's boyfriend; deceives and manipulates her.
- Bob Lam as Tsui Foo-kwai, wealthy playboy; falls for Ching-yee.
- Rebecca Zhu as Tong Yan, the "other shore flower"; involved in rivalries.
- Rainbow Ching as Lee Ping, Ka-po's grandmother.
- Yen To as Chung Shing, Ka-po's father.
- Candy Cheung as Lau Yuk-ling, Ka-po's deceased mother.
- Lenna Yeung as Tsang Wai-fong, Ka-po's stepmother.
- David Chiang as Pong Kwok-tung (K.T.), tycoon; Chun-yu's father.
- Regina Ho as Pong Tsz-shan, Chun-yu's younger sister
- Telford Wong as Chiu Si-kit, Tsz-shan's husband
- Terence Tung as Lee Wing-keung, Ching-yee's brother
- Patrick Dunn as Lam Chung-sam, Siu-mei's father
- Mak Ling-ling as Cheung Mei-kuen, Siu-mei's mother
- Lee Shing-cheong as Lo Wai, triad boss
- Snow Suen as Lam Lam, Yat-yin's assistant
- Carlo Ng as Chow Chong-fat, Wai-fong's extramarital lover
- Amy Fan as Fan Siu-keun (Cat), TV producer; aids Ka-kei, sabotages Ka-po.

== Plot ==
The Beauty of War explores the theme "Life is a battlefield; the more beautiful, the more resilient." The story follows the intertwined lives of three close friends — Chung Ka-po (Jeannie Chan), Lee Ching-yee (Moon Lau), and Lam Siu-mei (Hera Chan) — whose sister‑like bond gradually unravels after graduation. Siu-mei enters Ka-po into a beauty contest, and Ka-po eventually impresses a talent manager, Wong Yat-yin (Joel Chan), launching her into the competitive world of entertainment. Encouraged to enter the Miss Hong Kong pageant, Ka-po faces sabotage from her stepsister, Chung Ka-kei (Angel Chiang), which only fuels her determination to succeed. As Ka-po rises to fame and later marries wealthy heir Pong Chun-yu (Alex Fong), she grows increasingly distant from her friends, and their relationships are tested by jealousy, pride, and ambition amid the metaphorical "battlefields" of showbiz and high society.

== Production ==
The series was produced, written, and directed by Patrick Kong. Principal photography took place from May to 19 August 2022, and was shot in a cinematic style.

== Music ==
Track Listing
No.	Title	Lyrics	Music	Artist(s)	Length
1.	"Beautiful Battleground (美麗戰場)"	Hayes Yeung	Alex Lau	JW	4:08
2.	"Can't Wait for You (沒法等你)"	Hayes Yeung	Aska Cheung	Aska Cheung	3:38

== Ratings and reception ==
The series ranked first on Google Hong Kong's Top Searched TV Programs of the year. It maintained strong viewership in Hong Kong, despite receiving negative reviews. The show featured an open ending, which drew criticism from some netizens. Producer Patrick Kong stated that several alternative endings had been filmed, but the final cut was chosen based on audience reactions and the believability of each character's arc. Jeannie Chan received negative feedback for her acting, while Angel Chiang was generally praised. A writer from HK01 suggested a correlation between negative reviews, low scores, and high viewership in Hong Kong.

Week	Episodes	Airing dates	Ratings (Note: According to Hong Kong's TV rating system, each rating point represents approximately 64,670 viewers.)		Ref.
Week	Episodes	Airing dates	Cross-platform peak ratings	Viewership	Ref.
1	1 – 5	3–7 October 2022	18.7 points	1.22 million	
2	6 – 10	10–14 October 2022	19.1 points	1.24 million	
3	11 – 15	17–21 October 2022	20.7 points	1.34 million	
4	16 – 20	24–28 October 2022	22.8 points	1.48 million	

== Awards and nominations ==
Year	Award	Category	Nominated work	Results	Ref.
2022	AEG Entertainment Popularity	My Favorite TV Series	The Beauty of War	Won	
2022	AEG Entertainment Popularity	My Favorite Leading Actor (TV series)	Joel Chan	Won	
2022	AEG Entertainment Popularity	My Favorite Leading Actress (TV series)	Jeannie Chan	Won	
2022	AEG Entertainment Popularity	Best On-Screen Partnership (TV series)	Bob Lam and Moon Lau	Won	
2022	AEG Entertainment Popularity	Best TV Themesong	"Beautiful Battleground" (by JW)	Won	
2022	Yahoo Asia Multiverse Buzz Awards	Most Popular TV Series	The Beauty of War	Won	
2022	Yahoo Asia Multiverse Buzz Awards	Most Popular Female Character (TV series)	Chung Ka-kei (by Angel Chiang)	Won	
2022	Yahoo Asia Multiverse Buzz Awards	Most Popular On-Screen Partnership (TV series)	Jeannie Chan, Moon Lau, Hera Chan	Won	
2022	Yahoo Asia Multiverse Buzz Awards	TV Male Artist	Joel Chan	Won	
2022	Yahoo Asia Multiverse Buzz Awards	TV Female Artist	Jeannie Chan	Won	
2022	55th TVB Anniversary Awards	My Favorite Female Character In A Television Series	Lee Ching-yee (by Moon Lau)	Nominated	
2022	55th TVB Anniversary Awards	Best Supporting Actor	Bob Lam	Nominated	
2022	55th TVB Anniversary Awards	Best Supporting Actress	Angel Chiang	Won	
2022	55th TVB Anniversary Awards	Most Popular On-Screen Partnership	Bob Lam and Moon Lau	Nominated	
2022	55th TVB Anniversary Awards	My Favorite Actor in a Leading Role (Malaysia)	Joel Chan	Nominated	
2022	55th TVB Anniversary Awards	My Favorite Actress in a Leading Role (Malaysia)	Moon Lau	Won	
