= Zuo Guangdou =

Early 17th century Ming Dynasty official

- 左光斗
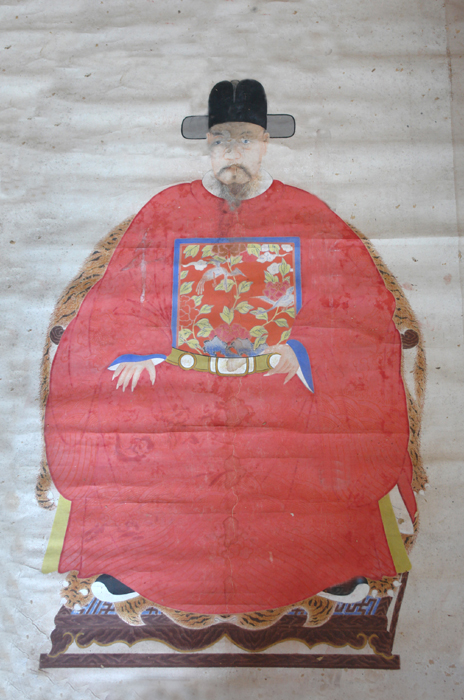

Left Minister of the Censorate
- In office 1624–1625
- Monarch: Tianqi Emperor

Left Minister of the Court of Judicature and Revision
- In office 1623–1624
- Monarch: Tianqi Emperor

Censor of the Censorate
- In office 1607–1623
- Monarchs: Taichang Emperor and Tianqi Emperor

Personal details
- Born: 12 October 1575
- Died: 26 August 1625 (aged 49)

Zuo Guangdou
- Chinese: 左光斗
Transcriptions
Standard Mandarin
- Hanyu Pinyin: Zuǒ guāng dǒu

Zuo Guangdou (12 October 1575 – 26 August 1625) was a prominent censorate official in the early 17th century. He detained hundreds of fake officials and confiscated hundreds of fake seals. His main rival was Wei Zhongxian.

== Biography ==
On 12 October 1575, Zuo Guangdou was born in Tongcheng, Anhui. He was named Guangdou because his birthday coincided with the god Doumu's birthdate.

In 1607, he and Yang Lian both became censors for the censorate. After Zuo finished his investigations, seventy fake seals were confiscated while he detained one-hundred fake officials. After the Taichang Emperor died, Wei Zhongxian forced Zuo and Yang to move into the Renshou palace. Tensions grew between the eunuchs and the Donglin movement faction, whose head was Yang. He was promoted to the Left Minister of the Court of Judicature and Revision in March 1623. In 1624, Zuo Guangdou was promoted to the Left Minister of the Censorate.

=== Against Wei Zhongxian ===
When Wei Zhongxian started to become a dictator in June of the same year, Yang Lian exposed Wei's twenty-four crimes and said that Wei should be put to death by Lingchi. Zuo Guangdou as well as more than seventy others supported Wei's impeachment. Along with them came another thirty-two crimes that were exposed. However, the Tianqi Emperor dismissed the accusations.

On 25 April 1625, Wei Zhongxian countered with false accusations. He stated that six members of the Donglin faction, including Yang Lian and Zuo Guangdou, had excepted bribes from Xiong Tingbi. The Wei faction tortured Donglin faction's Wang Wenyan into admitting that they had accepted bribes. Wei ruled that Yang Lian and Zuo Guangdou had twenty thousand stolen goods while Wei Dazhong had three thousand. This led to the imprisonment of Yang, Zuo, and four other members of the Donglin faction. They suffered five days of continuous torture. Shi Kefa, a disciple of Zuo, sneaked into the prison to visit his master. He said Zuo "was no longer in human form." Eventually, all six of them died due to the torture, with Zuo dying on 26 August 1625.

=== Posthumous honors ===
After the death of the Tianqi Emperor, the Chongzhen Emperor posthumously awarded the titles of "Right Minister of the Censorate"(右都御史) and "Assistant Protector of the Crown Prince" (太子少保). One of his sons was also accepted as an official. The Hongguang Emperor gave Zuo the posthumous name "Zhongyi" (忠毅) with the rank of Duke.

== In popular culture ==
- A General, a Scholar, and a Eunuch is a 2017 Hong Kong science fiction drama show. Zuo Guangdou is played by Raymond Cho and is one of the protagonists. He is the "Scholar."
- Baifa Monü Zhuan is a wuxia novel by Liang Yusheng. Zuo Guangdou is a minor character, a censorate official, who is murdered by Wei Zhongxian's men.

== Bibliography ==
- Zhang Tingyu (1739). "Volume 244". History of the Ming Dynasty (《明史》). Qing Dynasty.
- "Volume 2". Beilue of the Ming Dunasty (《明季北略》).
- Zuo Zaizhuan; Ma Qichang. "Volume 1". The Chronicles of Zuo Zhongyi (《左忠毅公年譜》). Qing Dynasty.
- Fang Bao. Zuo Zhongyi's Anecdote (《左忠毅公逸事》).
