= Beauty and the Boss (TV series) =

Hong Kong television series (2020–2021)

- Also known as: 愛美麗狂想曲
- Genre: Romance; Comedy; Drama; Fantasy
- Written by: Kwan Chung-ling; Wong Bing-yi; Lai Ka-ming
- Directed by: Lam Wai-ching; Wong Sze-yuen; Chan Yim-kei; Ng Koon-yu; Ng Koon-ching; Wong Lap-kong
- Starring: Ali Lee; Moses Chan; Edwin Siu; Raymond Cho; Jeannie Chan; Harriet Yeung; Zoie Tam
- Opening theme: "Love is Beautiful" by Hana Kuk
- Country of origin: Hong Kong
- Original language: Cantonese
- No. of episodes: 30

Production
- Producer: Marco Law
- Production location: Hong Kong
- Running time: 43 minutes
- Production company: TVB

Original release
- Network: myTV Super; TVB Jade
- Release: 2020 – 2021

Beauty and the Boss (Chinese: 愛美麗狂想曲; lit. 'Amelia's Rhapsody') is a Hong Kong television series created by television network TVB, with Marco Law serving as producer. It premiered exclusively on the myTV Super streaming service in December 2020 as the platform's original series, before airing on TVB Jade from 22 March 2021 to 30 April 2021 for 30 episodes. A romantic comedy at its core, the series stars Ali Lee, Moses Chan, Edwin Siu, Raymond Cho, Jeannie Chan, Harriet Yeung, and Zoie Tam, and chronicles the lives of colleagues and friends working at the fictional public relations company Skywise Strategy Group.

== Cast ==
- Ali Lee as Amelia Wong Lai-mei: a married woman for ten years who later divorces her husband after finding out he has an extramarital affair.
- Moses Chan as Matt Mak Tsz-fung: local branch CEO of Skywise Strategy Group
- Edwin Siu as Tong Yan: a partner at Skywise. He has a sissy personality with an ambiguous sexual orientation.
- Raymond Cho as So Chak-kei: an account executive at Skywise. Grieving over his wife's death many years ago, he started having an uncommitted sex life.
- Jeannie Chan as Lee Siu-yung: she works at Skywise and has a boyish personality.
- Harriet Yeung as Kiki Choi See-ki: Vice Director at Skywise who suffers from hypersexuality.
- Zoie Tam as Ho Yu-yan: she initially works at the rival public relations company, Blue Rain who later joins Skywise after meeting and befriending Siu-yung.
- Matthew Ho as Rex Cheng Yu: CEO of a mobile game development company who has a crush on Amelia
- Ashley Chu as Mandy Man Ching: CEO of Skywise's Greater Bay Area
- Claire Yiu as Shum Wai: Matt's ex-wife
- Telford Wong as Chau Cheuk-hin: Amelia's stepson
- William Hu as Chau Ka-ming: Amelia's husband who later is divorced
- Iris Lam as Lam Nam: works at Skywise
- Anthony Ho as Pang Yu-ngan: works at Skywise
- Fei Wu as Tsui Fei: works at Skywise
- Stitch Yu as Lam Nga-ting: works at Skywise
- Virginia Lau as Cheung Yuet: a model and Matt's girlfriend
- Hugo Wong as Hon Lui: a financial higher-up. He is married and later develops an extramarital relationship with Yu-yan
- Jackson Lai as Wong Lam: Siu-yung's senior during their school years whom she has a crush on

== Synopsis ==
Amelia Wong has been married for ten years, becoming a housewife. One day, she finds out her husband has an extramarital affair and decides to get a divorce, realizing that she has misspent her youth with a failed marriage. Through her good friend, Kiki Choi, an executive at the public relations company Skywise Strategy Group, Wong is employed there as a secretary. Here she befriends a group of good colleagues. During the process, Amelia falls in love with her boss Matt Mak, while taking the initiative to search for a journey of love, finding oneself, and finding one’s dreams.

== Production and background ==
The series was produced by Marco Law and script supervised by Kwan Chung-ling, Wong Bing-yi, and Lai Ka-ming. Principal photography took place approximately from June to October 2019. Utilizing romantic comedy as the backdrop, Beauty and the Boss focused on a female-based theme, highlighting the modern women in the working world and their pursuit of love and happiness. Producer Law expressed:

This story is a story of personal growth. The characters in the show have gone through all kinds of things. There is always something you dream of in life. You need to jump out of your comfort zone, break your routine, keep exploring, and keep moving forward in order to achieve your ideal and life goals.

== Music ==
The tracks were produced by Joseph Wei, Alex Lau, and Herman To and released under The Voice Entertainment Group.

Track Listing
No.	Title	Lyrics	Music	Artist(s)	Length
1.	"Love is Beautiful (愛很美麗)"	Sandy Cheung	Alan Cheung,	Hana Kuk	3:01
2.	"Falling in Love"	Wayne James	Kwong Jing-yan, Nick Wong	Kayee Tam	4:00

== Reception and ratings ==
Sam Ngou-ming from Ming Pao Weekly described Beauty and the Boss as a "healing drama about life," while UlifeStyle's Law Chi-wang praised its "realistic and down-to-earth" plot and its "warm, unconventional dialogue." Law and an editor at Hong Kong Economic Times both highlighted the inspirational quotes featured at the end of each episode, noting that they "resonated with the audience." Additionally, Tung Yan-hei from HK01 commended the characters for having their own "full and distinctive" personalities.

Week	Episodes	Airing dates	Average ratings (Note: According to Hong Kong's TV rating system, each rating point represents approximately 64,670 viewers.)		Ref.
Week	Episodes	Airing dates	Hong Kong	Macau	Ref.
1	1 – 5	22–26 March 2021	23.6 points	16.5 points	
2	6 – 10	29 March–2 April 2021	23.5 points	16.5 points	
3	11 – 15	5–9 April 2021	22.7 points	16 points	
4	16 – 20	12–16 April 2021	24.6 points	17.2 points	
5	21 – 25	19–23 April 2021	24.1 points	17 points	
6	26 – 30	26–30 April 2021	24.5 points	17.2 points	
Average Total:			23.8 points	16.7 points	

== Awards and nominations ==
Year	Award	Category	Nominated work	Results	Ref.
2021	54th TVB Anniversary Awards	Best Television Series	Beauty and the Boss	Nominated	
2021	54th TVB Anniversary Awards	Most Popular Female Character	Ali Lee (for Amelia Wong)	Won	
2021	54th TVB Anniversary Awards	My Favorite Actress In A Leading Role (Malaysia)	Ali Lee	Nominated	
