= Tiger Mom Blues =

Hong Kong television series

- Also known as: Kiss My Good Mother; Can You Kiss Me?
- 親親我好媽
- Genre: Comedy drama
- Created by: Kwan Wing-chung
- Written by: Lo Mei-wan
- Starring: Elena Kong; Ben Wong; Sharon Chan; Michelle Yim; Koni Lui; Matthew Ho; Kaman Kong; Willie Wai; Savio Tsang; Angelina Lo
- Theme music composer: Alan Cheung
- Opening theme: "Everlasting Love" (不變的愛) by Edwin Siu
- Country of origin: Hong Kong
- Original languages: Cantonese; Mandarin
- No. of episodes: 20

Production
- Executive producer: Kwan Wing-chung
- Running time: 45 minutes
- Production company: TVB

Original release
- Network: TVB Jade
- Release: 6 February – 3 March 2017

Tiger Mom Blues
- Traditional Chinese: 親親我好媽
- Cantonese Yale: Chānchān ngóh hóu mā
- Literal meaning: "Kiss my good mother"
Transcriptions
Standard Mandarin
- Hanyu Pinyin: Qīnqīn wǒ hǎo mā
Yue: Cantonese
- Yale Romanization: Chānchān ngóh hóu mā
- Jyutping: Can¹can¹ ngo⁵ hou² maa¹

Tiger Mom Blues (Chinese: 親親我好媽; pinyin: Qīnqīn wǒ hǎo mā; Jyutping: Can¹can¹ ngo⁵ hou² maa¹; Cantonese Yale: Chānchān ngóh hóu mā) is a 2017 Hong Kong television drama produced by Kwan Wing-chung and TVB. It premiered on TVB Jade in Hong Kong and Astro On Demand in Malaysia on 6 February 2017. The series covers the tiger mother phenomenon, where children are deeply influenced by a strict and autocratic parenting style. The final episode aired on 3 March 2017, totalling 20 episodes. It stars Elena Kong, Ben Wong, Sharon Chan and Michelle Yim.

== Synopsis ==
Raised by "Tiger Mom" Eliz Yue, stay-at-home mom Natalie Cha, who is deeply influenced by her strict upbringing, adopts an autocratic parenting style to raise her two daughters. It leads to resentment among them, especially for her elder daughter Venus Yim. Meanwhile, her husband Yim Ha, who has a softer approach in raising their children, faces a midlife crisis and the temptation of an extramarital affair, which estranges the couple.

Despite being extremely strict with her children, Natalie is very tough and often contends with another member of St. Gabriel School's parent-teacher association (PTA), Rebecca Yuen. The two eventually become friends, thanks to Natalie's friend and the dean of discipline at St. Gabriel, Claire Man.

Natalie wants her children to be successful academically, but finds out that Venus is dating Claire's younger brother, Hayden Man. Eventually, a secret Natalie has been keeping for over a decade comes out into the open, souring the mother-daughter relationship.

== Cast and character ==
=== Cha/Yim family ===
- Michelle Yim as Eliz Yue Kai-yin (于佳妍), Natalie's strict mother. Eliz is an acclaimed ballet dancer and pampers her younger granddaughter Echo, but was cold towards her step-granddaughter, Venus.
- Angelina Lo as Loe Fa (魯花), Ha's care-free mother.
- Elena Kong as Natalie Cha Heung-shin (查向善), the strong-willed stay-at-home mother of two academically accomplished children. Influenced by her own strict mother, Natalie is demanding of her two daughters, and is highly involved in her children's academic progress. She is part of the PTA (parent-teacher association) at her children's school, St. Gabriel School.
- Ben Wong as Yim Ha (嚴夏), Natalie's husband, a flat inspector, and the family's sole breadwinner. Ha has a softer approach in parenting his two daughters.
- Kaman Kong as Venus Yim Sin-yue (嚴茜瑜), Ha's 17-year-old daughter and Natalie's stepdaughter, a Form 6 student St. Gabriel School, and the head of her class. Venus is filial, hardworking, and has a passion for ballet, although her step-grandmother has criticised her for her lack of talent in dancing. She has a crush on Hayden.
- Sophia Hung as Echo Yim Sin-chung (嚴茜聰), Natalie and Ha's 11-year-old daughter, a Primary 6 student at St. Gabriel School. Echo is naturally talented at playing the piano, although her true passion is track & field.

=== Man/Cheng family ===
- Sharon Chan as Claire Man Ka-hei (文嘉熙), the dean of discipline at St. Gabriel School. Claire is a single mother of a 9-year-old boy, and is the sole guardian of Hayden, her teenage brother. Her husband died when Issac was young.
- Matthew Ho as Hayden Man Leong-hei (文亮熙), Claire's younger brother, who is in Form 6 at St. Gabriel School. Hayden was a gifted student, but an incident during primary school leaves him indifferent about his education. Hayden has a crush on ex-classmate Shun, who was expelled by St. Gabriel after getting pregnant.
- Ivan Chan as Isaac Cheng Tsz-yi (鄭梓宜), Claire's academically talented 9-year-old son who is enrolled in Primary 6 at St. Gabriel, skipping two grades. Sometimes, he visits the school janitor named Sing Gat-si.

=== Ko family ===
- Koni Lui as Rebecca Yuen Yuen (袁圓), nicknamed Princess Rebecca, an overindulging parent who spoils her 11-year-old son, Oscar. She comes from a wealthy family and is a member of St. Gabriel's PTA.
- Savio Tsang as Ko Yan (高仁), Rebecca's husband and Ha's close friend. Yan owns several properties and the owner of a popular noodle restaurant. His rags to riches story is an inspiration to his neighbours.
- Coleman Tam as Oscar Ko Wai-ting (高葦庭), Rebecca and Yan's spoiled 11-year-old son.

=== St. Gabriel School admin and students ===
- Willie Wai as Sing Gat-si (成吉思), Claire's friend, a janitor at St. Gabriel and enters the school for a special reason.
- Arnold Kwok as Hugo Lin Kwok-kai (連國佳), Venus and Hayden's classmate who represents Hong Kong in an international basketball competition. Though popular in school, Hugo comes from an abusive family. He has a crush on Claire.
- Hebe Chan as Meg Moe Sau-mei (毛守美), Venus' classmate and close friend.
- Mak Ling-ling as Tam Kim-lan (譚劍蘭), the head principal of St. Gabriel, who admires Claire.
- Ceci So as Yau Mat-mat (邱蜜蜜), the headmistress of the St. Gabriel's primary school, who always points against Claire.
- Chung Chi-kwong as Wong Sheung-ming (黃尚鳴), the chairman of St. Gabriel's PTA, who later resigned due to his health condition and was replaced by Natalie.
- Eileen Yeow as Mrs. Cheung (張太), a member of the PTA.
- Iva Law as Mrs. Chin (錢太), referred to as Daisy, a member of the PTA.
- Pauline Chow as Mrs. Chau (周太), a member of the PTA.
- June Chan as Mrs. Wong (黃太), a member of the PTA.
- Aurora Li as Miss Kan, a primary school teacher and the vice chairman of the PTA.

=== Other characters ===
- Becky Lee as Frances Hung Ngan-chi (洪顏姿), the project manager of a real estate development agency, who is friends with Ha.
- Mak Ka-lun as Chong Ding-tong (莊定湯), Ha's co-worker.
- Russell Cheung as Chung Lok-hoi (鍾樂凱), Ha's co-worker.
- Apple Chan as Luk Siu-shun (陸筱純), Hayden's former classmate. Shun was expelled by the school after getting pregnant, and is struggling to make a living. She has a two-year-old, nicknamed "Little Tiger."
- Virginia Lau as Miss Kelly Chan, a highly renowned pianist who takes over teaching and improves Echo's piano skills. Has ulterior motive for teaching Echo.

== Viewership ratings ==
The following is a table that includes a list of the total ratings points based on television viewership. "Viewers in millions" refers to the number of people, derived from TVB Jade ratings, in Hong Kong who watched the episode live.

#	Timeslot (HKT)	Air date(s)	Episode(s)	Avg.	Peak	HK Viewers (in millions)	Ref.
1	Mon – Fri, 8:30 pm	6 – 10 February 2017	1 — 5	23.8	27.8	1.54	
2	Mon – Fri, 8:30 pm	13 – 17 February 2017	6 — 10	24.8	29	1.60	
3	Mon – Fri, 8:30 pm	20 – 24 February 2017	11 — 15	25	TBA	1.62	
4	Mon – Fri, 8:30 pm	27 February – 3 March 2017	16 — 20	27	31	TBA	
Total average				25	31	TBA	

== Awards and nominations ==
Association	Category	Nominee	Result
StarHub TVB Awards	My Favourite TVB Drama		Nominated
StarHub TVB Awards	My Favourite TVB Actress	Elena Kong	Nominated
StarHub TVB Awards	My Favourite TVB Supporting Actress	Koni Lui	Nominated
StarHub TVB Awards	My Favourite TVB Female TV Characters	Elena Kong	Nominated
TVB Star Awards Malaysia	My Favourite TVB Drama Series		Nominated
TVB Star Awards Malaysia	My Favourite TVB Actor in a Leading Role	Ben Wong	Nominated
TVB Star Awards Malaysia	My Favourite TVB Actor in a Leading Role	Elena Kong	Nominated
TVB Star Awards Malaysia	My Favourite TVB Actor in a Leading Role	Sharon Chan	Nominated
TVB Star Awards Malaysia	My Favourite TVB Actress in a Supporting Role	Koni Lui	Nominated
TVB Star Awards Malaysia	My Favourite TVB Most Improved Actor	Matthew Ho	Won
TVB Star Awards Malaysia	My Favourite TVB Most Improved Actor	Arnold Kwok	Nominated
TVB Star Awards Malaysia	My Favourite TVB Most Improved Actress	Kaman Kong	Nominated
TVB Star Awards Malaysia	My Favourite TVB Drama Characters	Ben Wong	Won
TVB Anniversary Awards	Best Drama		Nominated
TVB Anniversary Awards	Best Actor	Ben Wong	Nominated
TVB Anniversary Awards	Best Actress	Elena Kong	Nominated
TVB Anniversary Awards	Best Actress	Sharon Chan	Nominated
TVB Anniversary Awards	Best Supporting Actor	Matthew Ho	Nominated
TVB Anniversary Awards	Best Supporting Actress	Kaman Kong	Nominated
TVB Anniversary Awards	Most Popular Male Character	Ben Wong	Nominated
TVB Anniversary Awards	Most Popular Female Character	Elena Kong	Nominated
TVB Anniversary Awards	Most Improved Male Artiste	Matthew Ho	Nominated
TVB Anniversary Awards	Most Popular Drama Theme Song	"不變的愛" (Everlasting Love) by Edwin Siu	Nominated
