= James Ng =

Hong Kong singer and actor (born 1990)

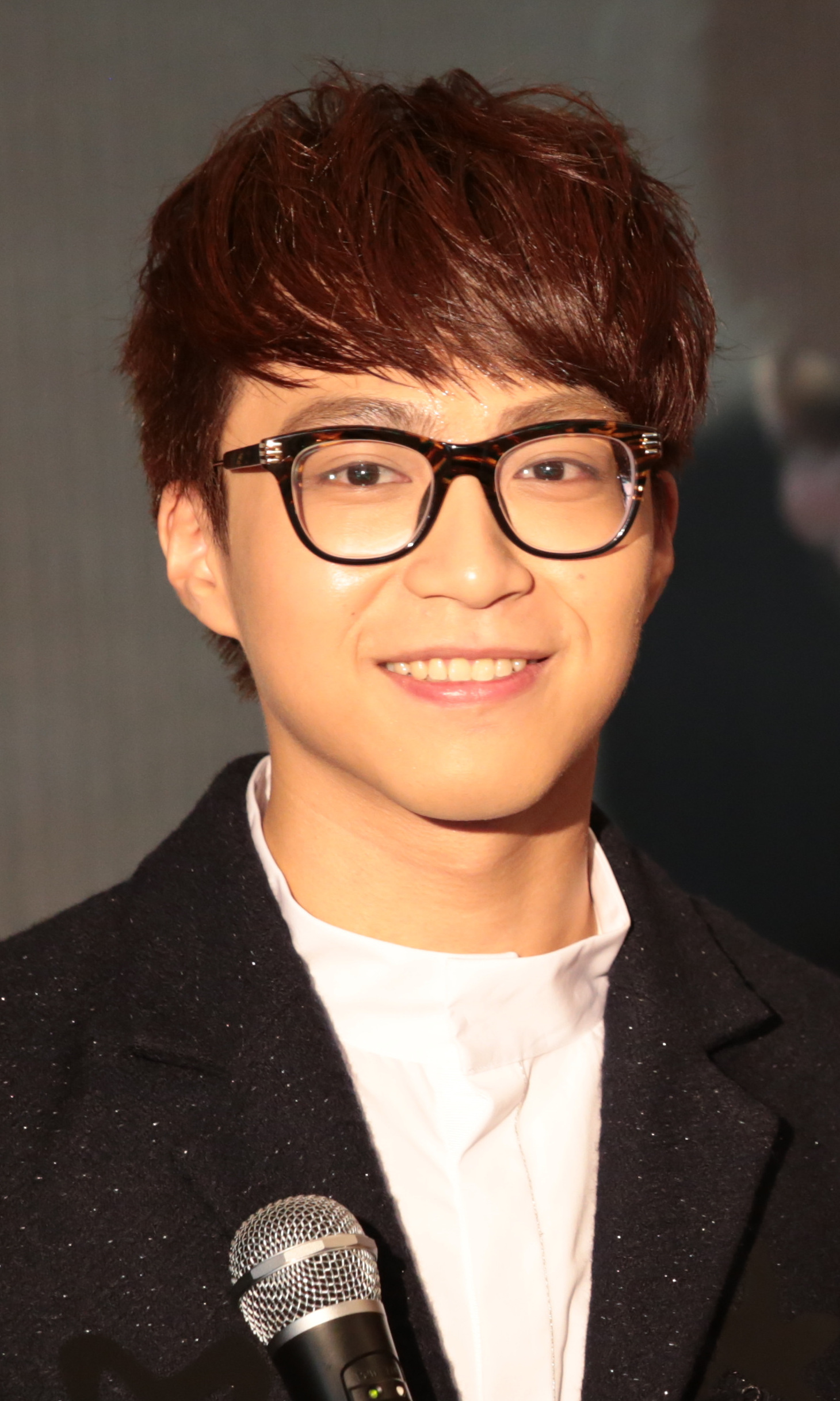
- Ng in 2015
- Born: 18 April 1990 (age 36); Hong Kong
- Occupations: Singer; actor
- Years active: 2010–present

Chinese name
- Traditional Chinese: 吳業坤
- Simplified Chinese: 吴业坤
Transcriptions
Standard Mandarin
- Hanyu Pinyin: Wú Yèkūn
Yue: Cantonese
- Jyutping: Ng4 Jip6 Kwan1
- Musical career
- Also known as: Jam Ng, Kwan Gor, Ng Yip Kwan
- Instruments: Guitar, Piano

James Ng, better known as "Kwan Gor" (born 18 April 1990) is a Hong Kong singer and actor. He is currently under a contract with TVB.

Ng had starred in the hit sitcom Come Home Love in the second season. He gained success through his two most popular songs which garnered over 6 million views on his YouTube channel. In 2015, Ng became the first to win the Most Favourite Male Singer Award and Most Favorite Song Award at the Ultimate Song Chart Awards. He also won J.S.G's Most Popular New Coming Singer Gold Award.

== Career ==
On 18 April 2015, Ng signed with Star Entertainment Records. His first songs "So She Loves Me Not Enough" and "Song of the Sunshine Point" successfully entered the top number of popular charts of various Hong Kong radio stations, and both songs became the second place on the 903 professionally promoted song list and the TVB hot song golden song list. The former was also featured in "Hong Kong's Top Ten Popular YouTube Music Videos in 2015". The MV ranked runner-up with a click rate of over 3.46 million at the end of 2015. The two songs had also become his masterpieces. In late 2015, the song "Spoiler" became his first champion song. On 18 November of the same year, he released his first solo album "KWAN GOR".

In the music awards ceremony at the end of the year, Ng was nominated "My Favourite Male Singer". He swept the newcomer awards at the music award ceremonies at the end of the year as a male newcomer. In the "2015 Golden Song Awards Ceremony", Ng won the "Most Popular Newcomer Bonus" and won the "Golden Melody Award" with his first tributary single "So She Loves Me Not Enough".

At the "Best Music Chart Awards Ceremony", Ng won the "Best Musical Talent Gold Award", the "Best Musician My Favourite Song Award" with "So She Loves Me Not Enough" and "Best Music World" as well as "My Favourite Male Singer". He also won awards in other music awards ceremonies, such as the newcomer of the year (male singer) and the top ten Chinese golden music awards concert "Most Promising Newcomer Award".

On 10 August 2016, after making his debut as a singer in just 16 months, Ng held his first solo concert "Kwan Gor 2016 live in Hong Kong" at the Hong Kong Coliseum in Hung Hom.

At the music awards ceremony at the end of the year, Ng continued to sweep the singers and song awards of various stations, and won the "Maddy Twelve Music Powers" award at the "New Town Madden Awards Ceremony 2016". At the "2016 Best Music Chart Awards Ceremony" held by the 903 commercial radio station, his song "People" won the "Top Ten Professional Recommendations" and he won "My Favourite Male Singer" award for the second time.

In addition, in the "Thirty-ninth Top Ten Chinese Golden Melody Awards Concert" hosted by Radio Hong Kong, "People" won the "Top Ten Chinese Golden Melody" award, and Ng won the "Gold Award for Best Progress Award of the Year". "People" also won the "Golden Song Award" at the "2016 Golden Song Awards Ceremony" held by TVB.

In 2017, Ng’s first solo title song of the year "Sad to Transfiguration" was released, which became the champion song of the four channels. It was the first time for Ng since his debut. He also became the third gigantic gang singer to win four championship songs. He was the second TVB artiste who has participated in TVB TV series (excluding unit series) to win the title song of four channels after the 2000s as well.

In 2018, Ng released the song "Arc de Triomphe", which was composed in France, and won the champion song of four channels again, which is the second time since he made his debut.

On 19 April 2019, Ng held his second solo concert "Wu Yekun Short-period Concert 2019" at the Hong Kong Coliseum in Hung Hom. In September 2019, it was announced that Ng had concluded his contract with Star Entertainment Records.

In March 2020, Ng signed with the record company Sunny Idea. His new song "Original Mind" was released in July. In addition, he recorded the song "One Road" during the quarantine period when returning to Hong Kong in April 2021 to record the mental journey of Working Holiday in Japan.

== Personal life ==
In January 2020, Ng passed the N2 qualification of the Japanese Language Proficiency Test. In November 2020, he passed the eighth grade of Ito-ryu Karate Zodiac. In the same month, Ng went to Japan alone to complete a five-month Working Holiday, and completed the "Tokaido Fifty-Three Times" working holiday trip from Kyoto to Tokyo on the 18th. In April 2021, He set up a personal life YouTube channel "坤佬 Kwannel".

On 8 May 2022, Ng announced via Instagram that he had been married. His wife is Japanese actress and news presenter Aiko Hamaguchi.

== Discography ==
- 2015 KWAN GOR (EP)

== Filmography ==
=== Films ===
Year	Title
2011	I Love Hong Kong
2012	I Love Hong Kong 2012
2016	Happiness
2016	Buddy Cops
2019	I Love You, You're Perfect, Now Change!

=== Television dramas ===
Year	Title	Role	Notes/Ref.
2015-16	Come Home Love (series 2)	Lei Lok-tung "Kenny"	
2016	Blue Veins	Ah Fu	
2017	My Ages Apart	Bao Pau	
2019	I Bet Your Pardon		
2019	Flying Tiger 2	Ben Wong Chi-bun	
2019	My Life as Loan Shark	Duncan Cheung Chun-hin	
2020	The Dripping Sauce	Wah Gor	
2020	Death By Zero	Fung Sir	
2020	The Impossible 3	Cheung Ying-long	
2021	Plan “B”	Yau Choi-fung	
2021	Used Good	Andy Lee Chi-hang	
2023	The Queen of News	Penny Ma Ka-ming	
2025	The Queen of News 2	Penny Ma Ka-ming	
Filming	香港人在北京		
