= Matthew Ho =

Hong Kong actor

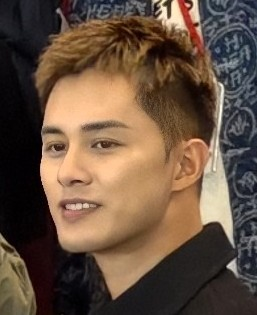
- Ho in November 2025
- Born: British Hong Kong
- Occupations: Actor, television presenter
- Years active: 2012–present
- Notable work: Law dis-Order; Tiger Mom Blues; Life on the Line; Big White Duel
- Awards: StarHub TVB Awards – Best New TVB Artiste; 2016; Most Improved TVB Male Artiste; 2017 TVB Star Awards Malaysia – Favourite TVB Most Improved Male Artiste; 2017 Tiger Mom Blues and A General, a Scholar, and a Eunuch TVB Anniversary Awards – Most Popular Onscreen Partnership; 2017 A General, a Scholar, and a Eunuch; Most Improved Male Artiste; 2018 Succession War, Life on the Line, Battle for the Exorcist’s Meter, Love Travel With High Speed Rail

Chinese name
- Traditional Chinese: 何廣沛
- Simplified Chinese: 何广沛
Transcriptions
Standard Mandarin
- Hanyu Pinyin: Hé Guǎngpèi
Yue: Cantonese
- Jyutping: Ho4 Gwong2 Pui3

Matthew Ho Kwong-pui is a Hong Kong actor and television presenter contracted to TVB. He had asthma when he was young.

Ho won the Most Improved Male Artiste award at the 2018 TVB Anniversary Awards.

== Early life ==
Matthew Ho was born in Hong Kong and attended St. Stephen's College in Stanley, Hong Kong until the age of 14, Form 3, when he and his family immigrated to San Francisco, California. After attending Foothill College in Los Altos Hills, California, he transferred to a California State University and graduated with a bachelor's degree in accounting. Half a year after his graduation, Ho returned to Hong Kong and became a DJ for the internet radio station, 9DTV. In 2012, he graduated from TVB's 26th artiste training class, and officially signed with the company.

== Career ==
After working as background actors in several TVB dramas, Ho first received attention for his role as the teen version of Lawrence Ng's character in 2014 the drama Never Dance Alone.

In 2016, Ho garnered more attention with his performance in the legal drama Law dis-Order. He gained recognition by winning the Best TVB New Artiste award at the 2016 StarHub TVB Awards.

In 2017, Ho won the Most Improved Artiste awards at both the StarHub TVB Awards and TVB Star Awards Malaysia. At the 2017 TVB Anniversary Awards, he won the Most Popular Onscreen Partnership award with Edwin Siu and Raymond Cho with their collaboration in the drama A General, a Scholar and a Eunuch.

In 2018, Ho garnered his first Best Actor nomination with the drama Life on the Line and won the Most Improved Male Artiste award at the 2018 TVB Anniversary Awards.

== Filmography ==
Television dramas
Title	Chinese title	Year	Role	Notes/Ref.
Come Home Love	愛·回家	2013	Mr. Shek, Jason, Cox, J.B., Artiste	Episodes 264, 473–478, 542, 614
Sniper Standoff	神鎗狙擊	2013	Audience member	Episode 3
Always and Ever	情逆三世緣	2013	Assistant	Episode 31
Bounty Lady	My盛Lady	2013	Young Man	Episode 2
Return of the Silver Tongue	舌劍上的公堂	2013–14	Scholar	Cameo
Never Dance Alone	女人俱樂部	2014	Alan Yiu Tsz-lun (young)	Flashback scenes Younger version of Lawrence Ng’s character
ICAC Investigators 2014	廉政行動2014	2014	Alan	Episode 5: "Partner"
The Ultimate Addiction	點金勝手	2014	News Reporter	Cameo
Rear Mirror	載得有情人	2014	Employee	Cameo
Line Walker	使徒行者	2014	Hit Team / SDU Member	Episode 23 and 25
Tomorrow is Another Day	再戰明天	2014	Correctional Services Officer	Cameo
All That is Bitter is Sweet	大藥坊	2014	Poisoned Soldier	Episode 24
Raising the Bar	四個女仔三個BAR	2015	Max Kwong	Supporting role
Young Charioteers	衝線	2015	Waiter	Episode 8
Romantic Repertoire	水髮胭脂	2015	Reporter	Cameo
Brick Slaves	樓奴	2015	Lo Dor-lok	Supporting Role
Every Step You Take	陪著你走	2015	Young man	Episode 19
With or Without You	東坡家事	2015	Sung Wai-kiu	Cameo
Blue Veins	殭	2016	Vampire	Episode 11
Brother's Keeper II	巨輪II	2016	Poon Siu-cheung	Cameo
Law dis-Order	律政強人	2016	Nick Chow Lik-hang	Major Supporting role
Rogue Emperor	流氓皇帝	2016–17	Suited Fighter	Episode 15
No Reserve	巾幗梟雄之諜血長天	2016–17	Guerilla Fighter	Cameo
May Fortune Smile On You	財神駕到	2017	Wong Chiu-choi	Main Role
Tiger Mom Blues	親親我好媽	2017	Hayden Man Leung-hei	Major Supporting role TVB Star Award Malaysia for Favourite TVB Most Improved Male Artiste
A General, a Scholar and a Eunuch	超時空男臣	2017	Lee Chun-chung / Lee Siu-tung	Main Role; TVB Star Award Malaysia for Favourite TVB Most Improved Male Artiste
Apple-colada	果欄中的江湖大嫂	2018		Guest Appearance; TVB Anniversary Award for Most Improved Male Artiste
Succession War	天命	2018	Fengshen Yinde	Major Supporting Role; TVB Anniversary Award for Most Improved Male Artiste
Life on the Line	跳躍生命線	2018	Cheuk Ka-kit	Main Role; TVB Anniversary Award for Most Improved Male Artiste
Big White Duel	白色強人	2019	Dr. Max Poon Wai-tak	Major supporting role
Of Greed and Ants	黃金有罪	2020	Chin Wing-kit	Major supporting role
The Dripping Sauce	大醬園	2020	Man Cheuk-fung / Daniel	Main Role
Armed Reaction 2021	陀槍師姐2021	2021	Homeless Person	Guest Appearance in Episode 15
Beauty and the Boss	愛美麗狂想曲	2021	Rex Cheng Yu	Special Appearance
Come Home Love: Lo And Behold	愛·回家之開心速遞	2021	Kwong-pui	Ep. 1310
Used Good	異搜店	2021	Wai Tak-shun	Main Role
Story of Zom-B	食腦喪B	2022	Yu Yeung-kwong	Main Role
Stranger Anniversary	雙生陌生人	2022	Otis Po Yik-chun	Major Supporting Role
Silver Lining	曙光	2022	Au Yiu-cho	Main Role
Communion	回歸	2022	Au Yiu-cho (young)	Younger version of Roger Kwok's character
Narcotics Heroes	破毒強人	2023	Tsui On-lok	Major Supporting Role
Let Me Take Your Pulse	你好，我的大夫	2023	Ku Ching-king	Main Role
The Queen of News	新聞女王	2023	Ivan Poon Chi-ngow	Guest Appearance
Darkside of the Moon	黑色月光	2024	Mok Ka-long	Supporting Role
The Fading Gold	金式森林	2025	Fong Hok-lai	Main role
The Queen of News 2	新聞女王2	2025	Ivan Poon Chi-ngow	
Ne Zha and Yang Jian	哪吒與楊戩	TBA	Wong Tin-fa	Major Supporting Role
	非常檢控觀	TBA	Sammy Chan	Guest Appearance

== Awards and nominations ==
=== StarHub TVB Awards ===
Year	Category	Drama / Role	Result
2016	Best TVB New Artiste	—N/a	Won
2017	My Favourite TVB Most Improved Male Artiste	—N/a	Won
2017	My Favourite TVB Actor	A General, a Scholar, and a Eunuch — Lee Chun-chung / Lee Siu-tung	Nominated
2017	My Favourite TVB Onscreen Couple	A General, a Scholar, and a Eunuch (with Rebecca Zhu)	Nominated

=== TVB Star Awards Malaysia ===
Year	Category	Drama / Role	Result
2016	Favourite TVB Most Improved Male Artiste	Brother's Keeper II and Law dis-Order	Nominated
2017	Favourite TVB Most Improved Male Artiste	Tiger Mom Blues and A General, a Scholar, and a Eunuch	Won
2017	Favourite TVB Actor	A General, a Scholar, and a Eunuch — Lee Chun-chung / Lee Siu-tung	Nominated
2017	Top 17 Favourite TVB Characters	A General, a Scholar, and a Eunuch — Lee Chun-chung / Lee Siu-tung	Nominated

=== TVB Anniversary Awards ===
Year	Category	Drama / Role	Result
2016	Most Improved Male Artiste	Brother's Keeper II, Law dis-Order and No Reserve	Nominated
2016	Best Supporting Actor	Law dis-Order — Chow Lik-hang (Nick)	Nominated
2017	Most Improved Male Artiste	May Fortune Smile On You, Tiger Mom Blues and A General, a Scholar, and a Eunuch	Nominated
2017	Most Popular Onscreen Partnership	A General, a Scholar, and a Eunuch (with Edwin Siu and Raymond Cho)	Won
2018	Most Improved Male Artiste	Succession War, Life on the Line, Battle for the Exorcist’s Meter and Love Travel With High Speed Rail	Won
2018	Best Actor	Life on the Line — Cheuk Ka-kit	Nominated
2018	Most Popular Male Character	Life on the Line — Cheuk Ka-kit	Nominated
2018	Favourite TVB Actor in Singapore	Life on the Line — Cheuk Ka-kit	Nominated
2018	Favourite TVB Actor in Malaysia	Life on the Line — Cheuk Ka-kit	Nominated
2018	Most Popular Onscreen Partnership	Life on the Line (with Bob Cheung, Joey Law and Arnold Kwok)	Nominated
2019	Best Supporting Actor	Big White Duel — Poon Wai-tak (Max)	Top 5
2019	Most Popular Male Character	Big White Duel — Poon Wai-tak (Max)	Nominated
2020	Best Actor	The Dripping Sauce — Man Cheuk-fung	Nominated
2020	Most Popular Male Character	The Dripping Sauce — Man Cheuk-fung	Nominated
2020	Favourite TVB Actor in Malaysia	The Dripping Sauce — Man Cheuk-fung	Nominated
2021	Best Supporting Actor	Beauty and the Boss — Cheng Yu (Rex)	Top 10
2022	Best Actor	Used Good — Wai Tak-shun	Nominated
2022	Best Actor	Story of Zom-B — Yu Yeung-kwong	Nominated
2022	Best Actor	Silver Lining — Au Yiu-cho	Nominated
2022	Best Supporting Actor	Stranger Anniversary — Po Yik-chun (Otis)	Nominated
2022	Most Popular Male Character	Used Good — Wai Tak-shun	Top 10
2022	Most Popular Male Character	Story of Zom-B — Yu Yeung-kwong	Nominated
2022	Most Popular Male Character	Stranger Anniversary — Po Yik-chun (Otis)	Nominated
2022	Most Popular Male Character	Silver Lining — Au Yiu-cho	Nominated
2022	Favourite TVB Actor in Malaysia	Used Good — Wai Tak-shun	Top 10
2022	Favourite TVB Actor in Malaysia	Story of Zom-B — Yu Yeung-kwong	Nominated
2022	Favourite TVB Actor in Malaysia	Silver Lining — Au Yiu-cho	Nominated
2023	Best Actor	Let Me Take Your Pulse — Ku Ching-king	Top 10
2023	Favourite TVB Actor in Greater Bay Area	Let Me Take Your Pulse — Ku Ching-king	Nominated
2023	Favourite TVB Actor in Malaysia	Let Me Take Your Pulse — Ku Ching-king	Nominated
2023	Best Supporting Actor	Narcotics Heroes — Tsui On-lok	Top 5

=== People's Choice Television Awards ===
Year	Category	Drama / Role	Result
2016	People's Choice Most Improved Male Artiste	Law dis-Order and Brother's Keeper II	Nominated (Ranked 5th)
2017	People's Choice Most Improved Male Artiste	Tiger Mom Blues and A General, a Scholar, and a Eunuch	Nominated (Ranked 3rd)
2021	People's Choice Best Actor	Used Good — Wai Tak-shun	Nominated
