= Kaman Kong =

Hong Kong actress

- 江嘉敏
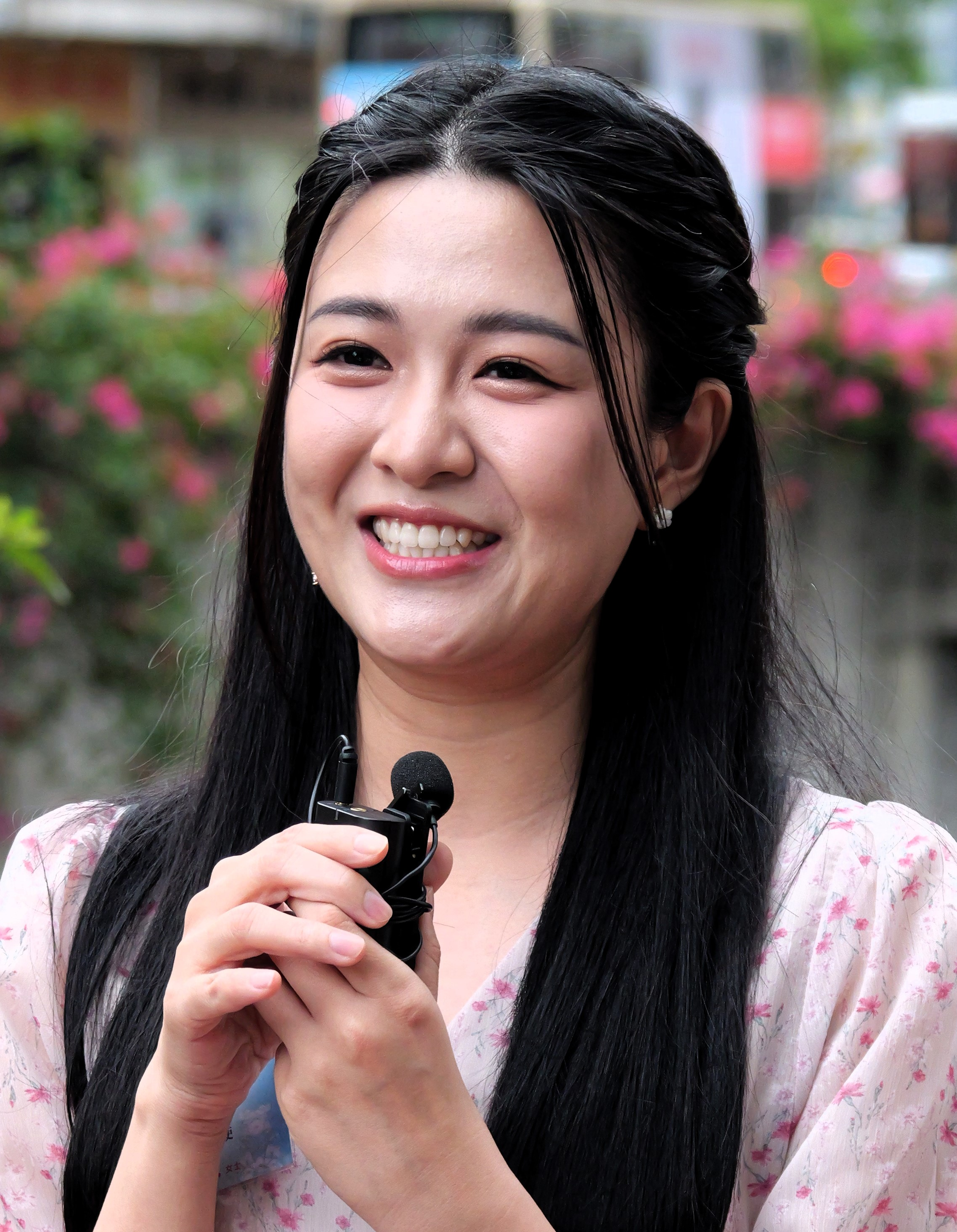
- Kong in 2024
- Born: 1994 (age 31–32)
- Education: Sacred Heart Canossian College
- Occupations: Actress, television host
- Years active: 2013–present
- Notable work: Tiger Mom Blues

Kaman Kong (Chinese: 江嘉敏; born 1994) is a Hong Kong actress formerly contracted to TVB. She gained recognition after starring in the drama Tiger Mom Blues (2017).

== Biography ==
Kong has been playing the piano since she was six years old. Kong can also play the erhu, guitar, and the drums. Her first job was being a piano teacher.

In 2013, Kong made her debut appearance as a television host for MachiTV. Her acting debut was in 2014's television film Uncertain Relationship Society (2014) directed by Heiward Mak for Below the Lion Rock. Her next role was in the film The Moment (2016), directed by Wong Kwok-fai. In 2016, Kong signed an artiste contract with TVB. She gained recognition after starring in the 2017 drama Tiger Mom Blues, garnering her first Best Supporting Actress nomination at the 2017 TVB Anniversary Awards. In 2018, Kong played her female leading role in the drama Fist Fight.

In July 2024, Kong won the "Hong Kong Fashion Professional Women's Election" award (commonly known as the "Female Version of Outstanding Young Artist") and was the only artist selected in that year.

In February 2025, Kong suddenly announced on social media that she was leaving TVB, ending her 9-year guest-host relationship with TVB.

== Filmography ==
=== Television dramas ===
Key
†	Denotes dramas that are in production or have not yet been released

Year	Title	Chinese title	Role	Notes/Ref.
2015	IPCC Files	監警有道	Man	Episode: "Little Disturbance"
2015	Those Years, Those Songs	那些年‧那些歌	Tat Tat	Episode: "Crazy" for Tat Ming Pair
2015	SFC In Action 3	證義搜查線3	Amy	Episodes: "Market Maker" and "Shallow Truth"
2015	A Wall-less World 5	沒有牆的世界5	Ah Sa	Episode: "The Biggest Achievement"
2015	Below the Lion Rock	獅子山下2015	Jinny	Episode: "Two Moons"
2016	My Family Doctor II	我的家庭醫生2	Sze Sze	Episode: "Understanding"
2016	Comfortable Women 5	女人多自在5	Ah Ling	Episodes: "My Beloved" and "Distance, Happiness"
2016	Privacy Beyond Price 2	私隱何價2	Siu-hau	Episode: "Behind a Woman"
2016	3X1	三一如三	Seiko	1 episode
2017	Tiger Mom Blues	親親我好媽	Venus Yim Sin-yu	Major Supporting Role
2017	My Unfair Lady	不懂撒嬌的女人	Molly Ling Man (youth)	Younger version of Jessica Hsuan’s character
2017	My Ages Apart	誇世代	Evon Sheung Ho-yi	Supporting Role
2018	Apple-colada	果欄中的江湖大嫂	Yummi Wong Yau-mei	Major Supporting Role
2018	Fist Fight	兄弟	"Sitting" Ma Sze-ting	Main Role
2019	The Ghetto-Fabulous Lady	福爾摩師奶	Ting Hiu-yiu	Major Supporting Role
2020	The Dripping Sauce	大醬園	Ko Sheung-sheung	Major Supporting Role
2020	The Exorcist’s 2nd Meter	降魔的2.0	Ka Ka	Guest Appearance
2020	Death by Zero	殺手	Ting Nga-man	Major Supporting Role
2020	Ratman to the Rescue	過街英雄	Ella Tong Mei-fun	Major Supporting Role
2021	Armed Reaction 2021	陀槍師姐2021	Homeless Person	Guest Appearance in Episode 15
2021	Battle Of The Seven Sisters	七公主	Hailey Koo Sheung-yi	Major Supporting Role
2022	Story of Zom-B	食腦喪B	Mok Siu-chun	Main Role
2022	You Light Me Up	神奇的電燈泡	Lai Sheung-man	Main Role
2022	Against Darkness	黯夜守護者	"Shabu" Lo Siu-bo	Major Supporting Role
2023	Golden Bowl	黃金萬両	Kam Chi	Major Supporting Role
2023	Treasure of Destiny	新四十二章	"Mon" Shiu Kwai-chi	Major Supporting Role
2025	The Fading Gold	金式森林	Fong Tsz-kwan	Main role
Filming		非常檢控觀		Guest Appearance

=== Films ===
Year	Title	Chinese title	Role	Notes
2014	Uncertain Relationship Society	曖昧不明關係研究學會	Kaman Kong Ka-man	
2015	Lazy Hazy Crazy			
2016	The Moment	此情此刻	Leung Ka-man	
2016	The Menu			
2019	Line Walker 2	使徒行者2：諜影行動	CID	

== Awards and nominations ==
Year	Award	Result
2017	TVB Star Award Malaysia for Favourite TVB Most Improved Female Artiste	Nominated
2017	TVB Star Award Malaysia for Top 17 Favourite TVB Characters	Nominated
2017	TVB Anniversary Award for Best Supporting Actress	Nominated
2017	People's Choice Television Awards for Most Improved Female Artiste	Nominated (Ranked 2nd)
2017	People's Choice Television Awards for Best Supporting Actress	Nominated (Ranked 4th)
2018	TVB Anniversary Award for Best Supporting Actress	Nominated
2018	TVB Anniversary Award for Most Popular Female Character	Nominated
2018	TVB Anniversary Award for Favourite TVB Actress in Singapore	Nominated
2018	TVB Anniversary Award for Favourite TVB Actress in Malaysia	Nominated
2019	TVB Anniversary Award for Most Improved Female Artiste	Nominated
2019	TVB Anniversary Award for Best Supporting Actress	Nominated
2019	TVB Anniversary Award for Most Popular Female Character	Nominated
2020	TVB Anniversary Award for Most Improved Female Artiste	Nominated
2020	TVB Anniversary Award for Best Supporting Actress	Nominated
2021	TVB Anniversary Award for Most Improved Female Artiste	Nominated
2021	TVB Anniversary Award for Best Supporting Actress	Nominated (Top 10)
2021	TVB Anniversary Award for Most Popular Female Character	Nominated
2021	TVB Anniversary Award for Most Popular Onscreen Partnership (with Priscilla Wong, Rosina Lam, Samantha Ko, Jeannie Chan and Judy Kwong)	Nominated
2022	TVB Anniversary Award for Most Improved Female Artiste	Nominated
2022	TVB Anniversary Award for Best Actress	Nominated
2022	TVB Anniversary Award for Best Supporting Actress	Nominated
2022	TVB Anniversary Award for Most Popular Female Character	Nominated
2022	TVB Anniversary Award for Favourite TVB Actress in Malaysia	Nominated
2023	TVB Anniversary Award for Best Actress	Nominated
2023	TVB Anniversary Award for Best Supporting Actress	Nominated
