= My Ages Apart =

- Poster
- 誇世代
- Genre: Comedy; Time-travel; Fashion
- Created by: Joe Chan
- Written by: Kwan Chung-ling; Cheng Sing-mo
- Starring: Bobby Au-yeung; Moses Chan; Louis Cheung; Kristal Tin; Ali Lee; Maggie Shiu; Benz Hui; Eddie Kwan; Sammy Leung; Elena Kong; Katy Kung; David Chiang; Helen Ma; James Ng; Anjaylia Chan; Louisa Mak; Hubert Wu; Angel Chiang; Zoie Tam; Kaman Kong; Dickson Yu; Mimi Chu
- Opening theme: My Ages Apart (誇世代) by Hacken Lee
- Ending theme: Do Not Remember Anymore (別再記起) by Jinny Ng
- Country of origin: Hong Kong
- Original language: Cantonese
- No. of episodes: 50

Production
- Producer: Joe Chan
- Production location: Hong Kong
- Running time: approx. 43 min
- Production company: Television Broadcasts Limited

Original release
- Release: 6 November 2017 – 12 January 2018

Related
- Oh My Grad; The Forgotten Valley

My Ages Apart (Chinese: 誇世代) is a 2017 comedy drama produced by TVB starring Bobby Au-yeung, Moses Chan, Louis Cheung, Kristal Tin, Ali Lee and Maggie Shiu.

== Plot ==
Sung Chung Kei (Bobby Au-yeung) and his mentee Kwong Kong Sang (Moses Chan) are two major investment bankers. However, Kong Sang uses unscrupulous methods which caused tension between them. During a plane crash, Chung Kei accidentally switches his soul with Bau Pau (James Ng) using a face-off card and is forced to live with his aunt, Bau Mei Na (Maggie Shiu). He also suspects that his wife, Ling Kit Yu (Kristal Tin) is having an affair with Kong Sang. Chung Kei decides to work with Kong Sang to find his lost soul. Kong Sang teams up with Sheung Ho Yiu (Ali Lee) in order to take revenge on the Sheung family. Lau Hang (Louis Cheung) is also seeking revenge on behalf of his godfather. The trio then embark on a time-travelling revenge plot ...

== Cast ==
=== Sung family ===
Cast	Role	Description
Raymond Cho 曹永廉 (young)	Sung Lai 宋禮	禮記 (Lai Kee): Father of Sung Chung Kei and Sung Chung Keung; Died in episode 32 due to colorectal cancer
David Chiang 姜大衞	Sung Lai 宋禮	禮記 (Lai Kee): Father of Sung Chung Kei and Sung Chung Keung; Died in episode 32 due to colorectal cancer
Meini Cheung 張美妮	Jeung Ying Fung 張英鳳	Mother of Sung Chung Kei and Sung Chung Keung; Deceased
Bobby Au-yeung 歐陽震華	Sung Chung Kei 宋仲基	Richard: Win Win Brothers iBanker → All in Bank CEO assistant → Sheung Tung Bank Head Office Deputy Manager; Ex-husband of Ling Kit Yu; Father of Sung On On
Kristal Tin 田蕊妮	Ling Kit Yu 凌潔茹	TVB Artiste; Ex-Wife of Sung Chung Kei; Stepmother of Sung On On
Anderson Junior 安德尊	Sung Chung Keung 宋仲強	Husband of Lai Sui Jue; Father of Sung Kai Kai
Amy Fan 樊奕敏	Lai Sui Jue 黎水珠	Wife of Sung Chung Keung; Mother of Sung Kai Kai
Anjaylia Chan 陳嘉寶	Sung On On 宋安安	Daughter of Sung Chung Kei and Ling Kit Yu; Ex-girlfriend of Sheung Ho Yeung
Louisa Mak 麥明詩	Sung Kai Kai 宋佳佳	Daughter of Sung Chung Keung and Lai Sui Jue; Ex-girlfriend of Sheung Ho Yeung
Hugo Wong 黃子恆	Sung Yuk 宋旭	包旭、旭仔: Son of Bau Mei Na; Godson of Sung Chung Kei; Appears in 2047

=== Kwong family ===
Cast	Role	Description
Cheng Shu Fung 鄭恕峰	Kwong Kam Hung 鄺鑑雄	Husband of Hor Ching Ching; Father of Kwong Kong Sang; Deceased 32 years ago due to a heart attack
Cecilia Fong 方伊琪	Hor Ching Ching 何晶晶	Wife of Kwong Kam Hung; Mother of Kwong Kong Sang; Deceased 32 years ago due to a car accident
Moses Chan 陳豪	Kwong Kong Sang 鄺港生	Mike: All in Bank iBanker → Sheung Tung Bank Sai Wan branch Deputy Manager → Manager → Sheung Tung Bank Head Office Manager; Son of Kwong Kam Hung and Hor Ching Ching; Becomes husband to Sheung Ho Yiu; Foster son of Chan Yuet Fan; Father of Sheung Shui
Mimi Chu 朱咪咪	Chan Yuet Fan 陳月芬	Fanny: Foster mother of Kwong Kong Sang; Develops schizophrenia

=== Sheung family ===
Cast	Role	Description
Liza Wang 汪明荃	Sheung Hing Chong 尚慶莊	Elder sister of Sheung Hing Duen; Saved Sheung Tung Bank; Cameo in episodes 48-49
Helen Ma 馬海倫	Sheung Hing Duen 尚慶端	尚董: Sheung Tung Bank Director; Wife of Lui Chun
Benz Hui 許紹雄	Lui Chun 雷震	雷公: Sheung Tung Bank CEO; Husband of Sheung Hing Duen
Paisley Wu 胡蓓蔚	Sheung Hoi Ching 尚可清	Jacqueline: Eldest daughter of Lui Chun and Sheung Hing Duen; Had an affair with Ko Man Kin
Elena Kong 江美儀	Sheung Hoi Sau 尚可秀	Julie: Day Day Love matchmaking CEO; Second daughter of Lui Chun and Sheung Hing Duen; Wife of Ko Man Kin
Eddie Kwan 關禮傑	Ko Man Kin 高文健	Gilbert: Sheung Tung Bank Vice-chairman; Husband of Sheung Ho Sau; Had an affair with Sheung Hoi Ching
Jacquelin Ch'ng 莊思敏	Sheung Hoi Chung 尚可頌	Ginger: Third daughter of Lui Chun and Sheung Hing Duen; Wife of Se Chan Sam, later divorced
Stephen Huynh 黃長興	Se Chan Sam 佘燦森	Husband of Sheung Ho Chung, later divorced
Ali Lee 李佳芯	Sheung Hoi Yiu 尚可瑤	Paris: Fourth daughter of Lui Chun and Sheung Hing Duen; Becomes wife of Kwong Kong Sang; Mother of Sheung Shui
Louis Cheung 張繼聰	Lau Hang/Sheung Hoi Mong 劉行/尚可望	Walking: Former triad member → Day Day Love staff → Sheung family bodyguard → Sheung Tung Bank Chairman; Son of Lui Chun and Sheung Hing Duen; Friend of Sung Chung Kei and Kwong Kong Sang; Boyfriend of Sheung Ho Yee
Zoie Tam 譚凱琪	Sheung Hoi Ka 尚可嘉	Julene: Previously a doctor before becoming a Bank Manager in Sheung Tung Bank; Fifth daughter of Lui Chun and Sheung Hing Duen
Katy Kung 龔嘉欣	Sheung Hoi Yan 尚可欣	Vivian: Sheung Tung Bank Deputy Manager of Risk Management → General Manager of Risk Management; Sixth daughter of Lui Chun and Sheung Hing Duen
Kaman Kong 江嘉敏	Sheung Hoi Yi 尚可兒	Evon: No actual relations with the Sheung Family; Seventh adopted daughter of Lui Chun and Sheung Hing Duen; Girlfriend of Lau Hang
Dickson Yu 余德丞	Sheung Ho Yeung 尚浩洋	Ocean: Son of Lam Man Keung and Sheung Ho Sau; Boyfriend of Sung On On; Ex-boyfriend of Sung Kai Kai
Grace Chan 陳凱琳	Sheung Shui 尚水	Kwong Kang Sang and Sheung Hoi Yiu's daughter; Appears in the year 2047; Cameo in episode 47 and 49

=== Bau family ===
Cast	Role	Description
Maggie Shiu 邵美琪	Bau Mei Na 包美娜	Dina: TVB artiste manager to Ling Kit Yu and Sheung Ho Yiu; Aunt of Bau Pau and Yeung Tzi Wai
James Ng 吳業坤	Bau Pau 包豹	TVB actor; Nephew of Bau Mei Na; Illegitimate son of Lui Chun
Angel Chiang 蔣家旻	Yeung Tzi Wai 楊紫惠	Niece of Bau Mei Na

=== Other cast ===
Cast	Role	Description
Sammy Leung 森美	Koo Tin Nok 古天諾	大頭B: Friend of Kwong Kong Sang; Ex-boyfriend of Sheung Ho Yiu
Hubert Wu 胡鴻鈞	Poon Wing Hang 潘榮亨	Henry、亨少: Ex-boyfriend of Sheung Ho Yan

=== Guest Star appearance ===
Cast	Role	Description
Jerry Ku 古明華	Seung Dao 常鵰	鵰兄: Has emotional disorder; Former Police Chief Inspector; Cameo in episodes 2, 27-32
Tsui Wing 徐榮	Biu Wai Ting 彪偉庭	In love with Bau Mei Na; Cameo in episodes 2-7, 9, 40-41
Priscilla Wong 黃翠如	Lam Jing Man 林靜雯	Ex-girlfriend of Lau Hang; Cameo in episodes 3-5
Edwin Siu 蕭正楠	Ma Fan Hak 麻烦客	Cameo in episode 15
Luk Wing Kuen 陸永	Chung Tai 鍾泰	花膠仔: Chung Jik's son; Ex-boyfriend of Sung On On; Elected district member in episode 21; Cameo in episodes 17-21, 36
Jason Chan 陳智燊	Jason	Bodyguard; Cameo in episodes 20-21
Tony Hung 洪永城	Lei Ji Wing 李志永	Sheung Ho Ka's ex-patient; Forgave Sheung Ho Ka in episode 36; Cameo in episodes 33-36
Ben Wong 黃智賢	Lam Man Keung 林文強	Father of Sheung Ho Yueng; Cameo in episodes 38-40
Chung King-fai 鍾景輝	Wu Dai Jong 胡大狀	Demented Lawyer; Cameo in episode 41
Lai Lok-yi 黎諾懿	Chu Gong 朱剛	Used by Chan Yuet Fan to deceive Lui Chun and Sheung Hing Duen; Cameo in episode 42
Nancy Sit 薛家燕	Yeung Gam Cheuk Ma 央金卓瑪	Gam Jue Group Chairwoman; Koo Tin Nok's godmother; Cameo in episode 44
Charmaine Sheh 佘詩曼	Leng Lui 靚女	Cameo in episode 50

== Viewership ratings ==
#	Timeslot (HKT)	Week	Episode(s)	Average points	Peaking points
1	Mon – Fri 20:30	6–10 November 2017	1 — 5	25	—
2	Mon – Fri 20:30	13 — 17 November 2017	6 — 10	24	26
3	Mon – Fri 20:30	20 — 24 November 2017	11 — 15	24	—
4	Mon – Fri 20:30	27 November – 1 December 2017	16 — 20	24	26
5	Mon – Fri 20:30	4 — 8 December 2017	21 — 25	23	—
6	Mon – Fri 20:30	11 — 15 December 2017	26 — 30	23	—
7	Mon – Fri 20:30	18 — 22 December 2017	31 — 35	23	—
8	Mon – Fri 20:30	25 — 29 December 2017	36 — 40	22	—
9	Mon – Fri 20:30	1 — 5 January 2018	41 — 45	25	26
10	Mon – Fri 20:30	8 — 12 January 2018	46 — 50	28	30
Total average				24	—

== Awards and nominations ==
Year	Award	Category	Recipient(s)	Result
2018	2017 TVB Anniversary Awards	Best Actor	Bobby Au-yeung	Nominated
2018	2017 TVB Anniversary Awards	Best Actor	Moses Chan	Nominated (Top 5)
2018	2017 TVB Anniversary Awards	Best Actress	Ali Lee	Nominated (Top 5)
2018	2017 TVB Anniversary Awards	Best Supporting Actress	Katy Kung	Nominated
2018	2017 TVB Anniversary Awards	Most Popular Male Character	Bobby Au-yeung	Nominated
2018	2017 TVB Anniversary Awards	Most Popular Male Character	Moses Chan	Nominated (Top 5)
2018	2017 TVB Anniversary Awards	Most Popular Female Character	Ali Lee	Nominated (Top 5)
2018	2017 TVB Anniversary Awards	Best Drama	—N/a	Won
2019	New York Festivals TV & Film Awards	Entertainment Special - Telenovelas (Finalist)	Itself	Won

=== Asian Television Awards 2018 ===
- Nominated - Best Comedy Programme
- Nominated - Best Actress (Ali Lee)
