= List of Gun Metal Grey characters =

Gun Metal Grey is a 2010 Hong Kong police procedural television serial drama produced by TVB. The drama follows a team of investigators who works in the Special Crime Unit of the Criminal Investigation Division in a Hong Kong police department.

== Police ==
- Ko Chun-man portrays Superintendent Lau (劉警司), who is the supervisor of Chong Shun.
- Tai Chi-wai portrays Chong Shun (莊信), nicknamed Bao Cha Chong (爆炸莊), which literally means Bombing Chong, a police chief inspector, who is the superior of both CID Team A and B.

=== CID, Team A ===
==== Mad Sir ====
Michael Miu portrays Mai On-ting (米安定), nicknamed Mad Sir, one of the story's main protagonists. He is Team A's Senior Inspector and is known for his quirky methods of investigating and interrogating. Despite being extremely hasty and thriftless, he always keeps his promises. He values friendship and a swift decision-maker. He heavily relies on his intuition and quick thinking when investigating cases.

He is good friends with Stone, though they once had a falling out due to their different styles of investigation methods. Mad was also the only suspect who witnessed Stone murder a defendant lawyer and his wife, though he only saw Stone's silhouette. After Stone is released from jail, Mad openly accepts him back into the team and helps Stone uncover the real murderer who framed him.

==== Stone Sir ====
Felix Wong portrays Shek Tung-sing (石東昇), nicknamed Stone Sir, one of the story's main protagonists. He was framed for murdering a defendant lawyer and his wife fifteen years ago, and was sentenced to a lifelong jail term. He later discovers a piece of key evidence while reading a magazine article written by Kim, and is later released from jail. He reunites with his wife and daughter, but their relationship is estranged. He returns working as Team A's Sergeant led by Mad Sir.

After released from jail, he thinks the laws governing today's society are unjust and have a need to use his own methods of punishing those who commit wrongdoing. Later, he is described to be a vengeful and insecure policeman who throws all the injustices and anger within his heart to society. As Stone Sir becomes more and more extreme, Mad Sir is dissatisfied with Stone's practice. This also causes the breakup of their long-term friendship.

Please refer to "underground magistrate".

- Nancy Wu portrays Hui Man-sze (許文詩), Team A's Sergeant.
- Vincent Wong portrays Carson Ko Kei-yeung (高紀煬), Team A's Probationary Inspector. He was killed by Shek Tung-sing in Chapter 28.
- Grace Wong portrays Kong Hoi-ching (江愷澄), nicknamed Leng Bao (靚爆), which literally means "unbelievably beautiful", a Team A officer.
- Oscar Leung portrays Lee Shim-leung (李閃亮), nicknamed Fai Shim (快閃), which literally means "to leave quickly", a Team A officer.
- Koo Ming-wah portrays Lo Hang (魯亨), nicknamed Lo Chai (老柴), which literally means "old and experienced person", a Team A officer.

=== CID, Team B ===
- Au Sui-wai portrays Ho Sir, Team B's senior inspector.

== Journalists ==
=== Boom Weekly ===
- Leung Shun-yin portrays Pao Wu Sau-wai (包鄔秀慧), the owner of Boom Weekly.
- Ngai Wai-man portrays the chief editor of Boom Weekly, the supervisor of Hui Man-him.
- Jessica Hsuan portrays Kim Hui Man-him (許文謙), one of the story's main protagonists. She is the editor for Boom Weekly, an entertainment magazine, and Sze's older sister.
- Vincent Wan portrays Yue Tai-ban (余大斌), a photographer for Boom Weekly.
- Cilla Kung portrays Daisy So Siu-kei (蘇小琦), a journalist for Boom Weekly.
- Rebecca Chan portrays Kan Chuk-kwan (簡竹君), an account clerk for Boom Weekly.

== Other characters ==
- Law Lok-lam portrays Ko Lap-yan (高立仁), a retired police superintendent and Ko Kei-yeung's father. He was killed by Chau Tai-fu after being revealed involving in the Fung Chung-wing murder 15 years ago.
- Rebecca Chan portrays Kan Chuk-kwan (簡竹君), Stone's wife and Ho Kai-chit's girlfriend.
- Mimi Chu portrays Lily Ma Lei-lei (馬莉莉), Kim's mother and Sze's adopted mother.
- Janice Ting portrays Sharon Shek Long (石朗), Stone and Kwan's teenage daughter.
- Yue Chi-ming portrays Shek Ka-chai (石家齊), Stone's father, who has Alzheimer's disease.
- Lily Li portrays Wong Mei-ha (王美霞), Stone's mother.
- Angel Chiang portrays Mai On-lok (米安樂), Mad's younger sister.
- Joseph Lee portrays Ho Kai-chit (賀佳喆), Kan Chuk-kwan's boyfriend. He looked after Shek's family when Stone was in prison.
- Leung Kin-ping portrays Tai Wai-kin (戴偉健), Kim Hui's ex-boyfriend. He cheated Kim Hui and deprived her editor position.

== Criminal cases ==
=== Fung Chun-wing murder (Ep. 1–11) ===
- Eric Chung portrays Fung Chun-wing (馮振榮), a lawyer. He was killed in his house with his wife 15 years ago. The murder was imputed to Shek Tung-sing.
- Nancy Wu portrays Hui Man-sze (許文詩), whose original name was Fung Siu-yau (馮小柔). She is the daughter of Fung Chun-wing. She was adopted by Ma Lei-lei after the murder.
- Felix Wong portrays Shek Tung-sing (石東昇), a policeman which was claimed to kill Fung Chun-wing 15 years ago. He was sentenced to 15-year jail. But he successfully overturned the judgement, was released from jail and restored to policeman in Chapter 1. He killed Chau Tai-fu in Chapter 11.
- Law Lok-lam portrays Ko Lap-yan (高立仁), the former supervisor of Chong Shun and Ho Kim-wai. 15 years ago, he stole HK$5 million in a drug trafficking case and determined to launder the money with Fung Chun-wing. He appointed Chau Tai-fu to steal the money from Chun-wing. He was killed by Chau Tai-fu in Chapter 11.
- Tai Chi-wai portrays Chong Shun (莊信), the former subordinate of Ko Lap-yan. He was instructed by Ko Lap-yan to impute the murder to Shek Tung-sing 15 years ago.
- Ho Kai-nam portrays Chau Tai-fu (仇大虎), the murder appointed by Ko Lap-yan to kill Fung Chun-wing and his wife 15 years ago. He killed Ho Kim-wai and Ko Lap-yan in Chapter 10 and 11 respectively. He was killed by Shek Tung-sing in Chapter 11.
- Cheng Ka-sang portrays Ho Kim-wai (何劍威), the former subordinate of Ko Lap-yan. He was instructed by Ko Lap-yan to impute the murder to Shek Tung-sing 15 years ago. He was killed by Chau Tai-fu in Chapter 10.
- Chan Min-leung portrays Heroin Sing (白粉成), a prisoner involving in a drug trafficking case 15 years ago.

=== Kitchen stove murder (Ep. 2–3) ===
- Shum Po-yee portrays Chan Wai-mei (陳惠媚). She is Uncle Mau's wife and Koo Hing-fai's girlfriend. She was killed and her body was put in kitchen stove.
- Chan Tik-hak portrays Uncle Mau (茅叔). He is Chan Wai-mei's husband. He was killed and found hanged in his home.
- Peter Pang portrays Koo Hing-fai (古慶輝). He is Chan Wai-mei's boyfriend. He killed Chan Wai-kuen and Uncle Mau.

=== Children dismemberment (Ep. 4–6) ===
- Lau Lok-ming portrays Yin Tsai (賢仔), who is the son of Uncle Chung and Sister Kuen. He was mistakenly killed by Uncle Chung.
- Savio Tsang portrays Uncle Chung (忠叔), who is the father of Yin Tsai and the husband of Sister Kuen. He killed Yin Tsai mistakenly, then killed and dismembered Yin Tsai's classmates. He died in an explosion after he ignited LPG in his house.
- Wong Tsz-wai portrays Sister Kuen (娟姐), who is the mother of Yin Tsai and the wife of Uncle Chung.
- Wah Chong-nam portrays Village Chef Ho (何村長), who is a village chef. His son is Yin Tsai's classmate killed by Uncle Chung.

=== Pseudo-model rape-killing (Ep. 12–14) ===
- Wendy Lee portrays Chan On Nai (陳安娜), with stage name Gina B, a pseudo-model, who was raped and killed by Frankie Chiang in Chapter 12.
- Coffee Lam portrays Yuki, a pseudo-model, who was raped by Frankie Chiang in chapter 12 but he chose not to murder her since the sirens arrived, instead he left her naked in the woods.
- Stephen Huynh portrays Frankie Chiang (蔣俊暉), a photographer who enjoys to sexually torture and murder pseudo models. In Chapter 12, Frankie raped and murdered Gina B, and raped Yuki in Chapter 13. During the crime, he bonds the models and videotapes the rapes, then he sends copies of the crime to their family members. He was arrested and sentenced to life in Chapter 14.
- Daniel Kwok portrays Yuen Kwok-hung (袁國雄), a photographer assistant. He secretly took countless pictures of women and uploaded pornographic photos to the Internet, some included the rape of Gina B. The police originally believed he was the murderer. He was arrested in Chapter 12 but was confirmed uninvolved in the case.

=== Ho Mei-hung murder (Ep. 15–17) ===
- Janice Shum portrays Ho Mei-hung (何美紅), the deceased. She is married to Chan Ka-kuen and the mistress of Leung Kan. She determined to kill Chan Ka-kuen and his father by poison to cheat the HK$1M insurance compensation. She was killed by Kuen's father in Chapter 15.
- Ip Wai portrays Chan Ka-kuen (陳家權). He was a journalist of the Boom Weekly and the subordinate of Hui Man-him. He is the husband of Ho Mei-hung.
- Kwok Tak-shun portrays the father of Chan Ka-kuen, and the father-in-law of Ho Mei-hung. He killed Ho Mei-hung in Chapter 15.
- Wong Wai-tak portrays Leung Kan (梁澗). He is the boss of a metalware store. He is the husband of Yeung Ka-hung and the lover of Ho Mei-hung.
- Candy Chu portrays the wife of Leung Kan.

=== Careless driving driver murders (Ep.17–19) ===
- Yik Chi-yuen portrays Peter Lam Sai-cheong (林世昌), a truck driver, who was involved in drunk driving, causing the injury of Cheung Chi-hin and the deaths of Cheung's parents and wife. He was knocked down and killed by a car driven by Lau Yin-ling in Chapter 17.
- Kwan Ho-yeung portrays David Law Tai-ming (羅戴明), a driver, who involved careless driving. He was knocked down and seriously injured by a car driven by Lau Yin-ling in Chapter 18.
- Deno Cheung portrays Robert Mak Chi-wai (麥志偉), a driver, who knocked down and killed Lau Yin-ling's son. He was knocked down and killed by Lau Yin-ling in Chapter 19.
- Poon Fong-fong portrays Lau Yin-ling (劉燕玲), a volunteer in traffic accident tutorial centre. Her son was knocked down and killed by a car driven by Robert. She made use of Lui Kin to plan her revenge on careless driving drivers, including Peter, David and Robert. She committed suicide and died in Chapter 19, just after prosecuted by Carson Ko.
- Bond Chan portrays Cheung Chi-hin (張志軒), who was injured in Peter's drunk driving. His parents and wife were killed.
- Alice Fung So-bor portrays the grandmother of Cheung Chi-hin.
- Wong Chun-tong portrays Lui Kin (雷堅), who was a speed racer and is now the owner of a scrapyard. Previously he knocked down and killed his girlfriend during speed racing. He was instigated by Lau Yin-ling to plan Lau's revenge on careless driving drivers.

=== Young girl dismemberment (Ep. 20-21) ===
- Gogo Cheung portrays Kitty, the deceased. She was Jackie Chan, Kam Sai-man, To Tik-kei and Chan Hung-nin's friend. She was killed by Kam Sai-man and dismembered by Jackie Chan, Kam Sai-man, To Tik-kei and Chan Hung-nin in Chapter 20.
- Queena Chan portrays Jackie Chan Wing Chi (陳穎芝). She was Kitty, Kam Sai-man, To Tik-kei's friend, and Chan Hung-nin's girlfriend. She introduced Kam Sai-man's prostitution job to Kitty. She helped Kam Sai-man to dismember Kitty's body.
- Oscar Chan portrays Kam Sai-man (甘世文), nicknamed King Kong. He was Kitty, Jackie Chan, To Tik-kei and Chan Hung-nin's friend. He killed and dismembered Kitty when she refused to take prostitution job.
- Aniszico Hau portrays To Tik-kei (杜力奇), nicknamed K Tsai. He was Kitty, Jackie Chan, Kam Sai-man and Chan Hung-nin's friend. He helped Kam Sai-man to dismember Kitty's body.
- Max Choi portrays Jacky Chan Hung-nin (陳雄年), nicknamed Panda. He was Kitty, Kam Sai-man and To Tik-kei's friend, and Jackie Chan's boyfriend. He helped Kam Sai-man to dismember Kitty's body.

=== Prostitute murders (Ep. 21-24) ===
- Patrick Tang portrays Ting Yuen-ho (丁遠浩), a doctor and a whoremaster. He was Tracy's boyfriend. He suffered from dissociative identity disorder and sometimes believed that he was Tracy. Motivated by Tracy's identity, Ting killed three prostitutes, Chiu Suk-kuen, Cheung Chun-lai and Chow Lai-sum, after having sex with them in Chapter 21. He committed suicide under the instigation of Shek Tung-sing in Chapter 24.
- Tammy Ho portrays Chiu Suk-kuen (趙淑娟), a prostitute. She was killed by Ting Yuen-ho in Chapter 21.
- Wu Mei-sze portrays Cheung Chun-lai (張春麗), a prostitute. She was killed by Ting Yuen-ho in Chapter 21.
- Cheung Mei-yee portrays Chow Lai-sum (周麗心), a prostitute. She was killed by Ting Yuen-ho in Chapter 21.
- Pauline Chow portrays Tracy Lee Choi-sze (李彩思), Ting Yuen-ho's girlfriend and Nancy's younger sister. She committed suicide after finding Ting procuring prostitutes in Chapter 22.
- Fanny Ip portrays Nancy Lee Choi-lei (李采妮), Tracy's elder sister.

=== Billionaire murders (Ep. 24-26) ===
- Leo Tsang portrays Chin Wing-choi (錢永財), a billionaire and Rose Chin's husband. He jointly invested in a chemical factory in Vietnam with Mo's brothers. He was killed by Yuen Chi-ming by cyanide poisoning in Chapter 24.
- Elena Kong portrays Rose Chin Chow Tsz-lun (錢周芷倫), Chin Wing-choi's wife and Mai On-ting's ex-girlfriend.
- Raymond Tsang portrays Mo Yau-leung (巫有良), a triad member and Mo Yau-Tak's elder brother. The brothers jointly invested in a chemical factory in Vietnam with Chin Wing-choi. He was killed by Yuen Chi-ming by cyanide poisoning in Chapter 25.
- Law Tin-chi portrays Mo Yau-tak (巫有德), Mo Yau-leung's younger brother. The brothers jointly invested in a chemical factory in Vietnam with Chin Wing-choi. He was almost killed by Yuen Chi-ming in Chapter 26.
- Max Cheung portrays Yuen Chi-ming (阮志明), a Vietnam Chinese and an engineer in a chemical factory invested by Chin Wing-choi and Mo's brothers. He was imputed by Mo Yau-leung to be responsible for an explosion accident in the factory. His wife and daughter were also killed in the accident. He revenged to kill Chin Wing-choi and Mo Yau-leung by cyanide poisoning. He was arrested when he tried to kill Mo Yau-tak in Chapter 26.

=== Missing people murders (Ep. 26-28) ===
- Chuk Man-kwan portrays Chan Ar-ping (陳亞萍), an outlier and Fong Chun-yiu's wife.
- Siu Cheuk Yiu portrays Fong Chun-yiu (方俊耀), an outlier and Chan Ar-ping's husband, who killed Sister Sin, Uncle Ping and Aunt Yung. He was killed by Shek Tung-sing in Chapter 28.
- So Lai-ming portrays Sister Sin (善姐), Chan Ar-ping's friend who helped Chan to find jobs for her. But she was killed by Fong Chun-yiu.
- Fong Fu-keung portrays Uncle Ping (炳叔), Chan Ar-ping's boss. He was killed by Fong Chun-yiu.
- Ng Heung-lun portrays Aunt Yung (容姨), Chan Ar-ping's friend who helped Chan to look after her son. But she was killed by Fong Chun-yiu.

=== Underground magistrate (Ep. 11-30) ===
- Felix Wong portrays Shek Tung-sing (石東昇), nicknamed Stone Sir. After being released from 15 years behind bars, Stone Sir thought that the current legal system could not punish but only bias towards the guilty. To become more and more extreme, he acted as an "underground magistrate" to use his own methods of punishing those who commit wrongdoing, including:
  - Killed Chau Tai-fu (portrayed by Ho Kai-nam) in Chapter 11
  - Made a false accusation against Frankie Chiang (portrayed by Stephen Huynh) in Chapter 14
  - Agreed with the false accusation done by Chan Ka-kuen (portrayed by Ip Wai) in Chapter 16
  - Destroyed the evidence against Lau Yin-ling (portrayed by Poon Fong-fong) in Chapter 19
  - Determined to incite Kam Sai-man (portrayed by Oscar Chan) to kill Chan Wing-chi (portrayed by Queena Chan) in Chapter 20
  - Changed the medicine and incited Ting Yuen-ho (portrayed by Patrick Tang) to commit suicide in Chapter 24
  - Determined to convince Yuen Chi-ming (portrayed by Max Cheung) to kill Mo Yau-tak (portrayed by Law Tin-chi) in Chapter 26
  - Killed Fong Chun-fai (portrayed by Siu Cheuk-yiu) and Carson Ko (portrayed by Vincent Wong) in Chapter 28
  - Killed Ar Long (portrayed by Eric Li) and determined to kill Hui Man-him (portrayed by Jessica Hsuan) in Chapter 29/30
  - Sentenced to prison with the loss of his hearing ability and his right leg in Chapter 30

== See also ==
- Gun Metal Grey
- List of Gun Metal Grey episodes
