= Vincent Wan =

Vincent Wan may refer to:

- Vincent Wan Yeung-ming (born 1958), Hong Kong actor
- Vincent Wan Ka-hung (born 1984), Hong Kong actor
