= List of awards and nominations received by Hana Kuk =

Hana Kuk awards and nominations
Awards and nominations
Award	Wins	Nominations
Cantonese Songs Chart Awards	1	1
Chinese Golden Melody Awards	1	1
Jade Solid Gold Best Ten Music Awards Presentation	5	7
Jade Solid Gold Songs Selections	4	5
Metro Showbiz Hit Awards	1	1
RTHK Top 10 Gold Songs Awards Ceremony	2	2
Jade Solid Gold Songs Selections	14	17
StarHub TVB Awards	1	2
TVB Star Awards Malaysia	1	1
TVB Anniversary Awards	1	30

Totals (Note: Certain award groups do not simply award one winner. They acknowledge several different recipients, have runners-up, and have third place. Since this is a specific recognition and is different from losing an award, runner-up mentions are considered wins in this award tally. For simplification and to avoid errors, each award in this list has been presumed to have had a prior nomination.)
- Wins: 16
- Nominations: 50

Hana Kuk is a Cantopop Hong Kong female singer-songwriter. She debuted in 2016 by releasing the single, Today's Me. She gained commercial success by singing the soundtracks from TVB. In November 2017, she released her debut album, Forget Myself.

== Music Awards ==
=== Cantonese Songs Chart Awards ===
Year	Award	Work	Result	Ref.
2017	Popular New Artist	Herself	Won	

=== Chinese Golden Melody Awards ===
Year	Award	Work	Result	Ref.
2017	Outstanding New Artist	Herself	Won	

=== Jade Solid Gold Best Ten Music Awards Presentation ===
Year	Award	Work	Result	Ref.
2017	Best New Artist	Herself	Bronze Award	
2017	Jade Solid Gold Best 10 Songs	A Fool's Fairytale	Nominated	
2017	Jade Solid Gold Best 10 Songs	Forgot Myself	Won	
2017	Jade Solid Gold Best 10 Songs	Waiting For A Lifetime	Won	
2017	Best Collaboration	Hesitantly	Bronze Award	
2017	Best Female Artist	Herself	Won	
2017	Most Popular Artist	Herself	Nominated	

=== Jade Solid Gold Songs Selections ===
Year	Award	Work	Result	Ref.
2017	First Round	Sand in Hand	Won	
2017	First Round	Waiting For A Lifetime	Won	
2017	First Round	Seven Years Old	Nominated	
2017	Second Round	Forgot Myself	Won	
2017	Second Round	Reunion	Won	
2018	First Round	Flying Into The Flame	Won	
2018	First Round	The Tears of Snow	Nominated	
2018	First Round	Back To The Day We Met	Won	
2018	Second Round	Never Said	Won	
2018	Second Round	Last Forever	Won	
2018	Second Round	Love You Again	Won	
2019	First Round	You Are My World	Won	
2019	First Round	I Finally Cried	Won	
2019	First Round	Unwilling	Won	
2019	First Round	Don't Be Afraid	Nominated	
2019	Second Round	Be Brave	Won	
2019	Second Round	Without You	Won	

=== Metro Showbiz Hit Awards ===
Year	Award	Work	Result	Ref.
2016	Best New Artist	Herself	Silver Award	

=== RTHK Top 10 Gold Songs Awards Ceremony ===
The RTHK Top 10 Gold Songs Awards Ceremony(zh:十大中文金曲頒獎音樂會) is held annually in Hong Kong since 1978. The awards are determined by Radio and Television Hong Kong based on the work of all Asian artists (mostly cantopop) for the previous year.

Year	Award	Work	Result	Ref.
2017	Best New Artist	Herself	Merit	
2017	Artist On The Rise	Herself	Silver Award	

=== StarHub TVB Awards ===
Year	Award	Work	Result	Ref.
2017	My Favorite TVB Soundtrack	Forgot Myself	Won	
2017	My Favorite TVB Soundtrack	Sand in Hand	Nominated	

=== TVB Star Awards Malaysia ===
Year	Award	Work	Result	Ref.
2017	Favorite TVB Soundtrack	Sand in Hand	Won	

=== TVB Anniversary Awards ===
Year	Award	Work	Result	Ref.
2017	Most Popular Soundtrack	Waiting for A Lifetime	Nominated	
2017	Most Popular Soundtrack	Sand in Hand	Nominated	
2017	Most Popular Soundtrack	Reunion	Nominated	
2017	Most Popular Soundtrack	Forgot Myself	Nominated	
2017	Most Popular Soundtrack	Hesitantly (with Vincent Wong)	Nominated	
2018	Most Popular Soundtrack	Back to the Day	Nominated	
2018	Most Popular Soundtrack	Tears of Xue	Nominated	
2018	Most Popular Soundtrack	Flying into the Flame	Nominated	
2018	Most Popular Soundtrack	Love You Again	Nominated	
2018	Most Popular Soundtrack	Never Said	Nominated	
2018	Most Popular Soundtrack	Last Forever	Won	
2018	Most Popular Soundtrack	Don’t Be Afraid	Nominated	
2019	Most Popular Soundtrack	Unwilling	Nominated	
2019	Most Popular Soundtrack	I Finally Cried	Nominated	
2019	Most Popular Soundtrack	You Are My World	Nominated	
2019	Most Popular Soundtrack	Without You	Nominated	
2019	Most Popular Soundtrack	Be Brave	Nominated	
2020	Most Popular Soundtrack	Liar	Nominated	
2020	Most Popular Soundtrack	The Second Choice	Nominated	
2020	Most Popular Soundtrack	If You Understand	Nominated	
2020	Most Popular Soundtrack	I Can’t Forget About You	Nominated	
2020	Most Popular Soundtrack	I Don’t Want to Lose	Nominated	
2020	Most Popular Soundtrack	Letting Go	Nominated	
2020	Most Popular Soundtrack	Can’t Let You Go	Nominated	
2020	Most Popular Soundtrack	Feels Like Heaven	Nominated	
2021	Most Popular Soundtrack	Love Is Beautiful	Nominated	
2021	Most Popular Soundtrack	Secret Garden	Top 10	
2021	Most Popular Soundtrack	Trust Nobody	Nominated	
2021	Most Popular Soundtrack	Butterfly Effect (with Vincent Wong)	Nominated	
2021	Most Popular Soundtrack	Fear In My Heart	Nominated	
