= Lily Leung =

Chinese actress from Hong Kong

- Chinese: 梁舜燕
- Born: 7 January 1929; British Hong Kong
- Died: 13 August 2019 (aged 90); Hong Kong Buddhist Hospital, Lok Fu, Wong Tai Sin, Hong Kong
- Other names: Leung Shun-Yin, Liang Shun-Yan, Liang Shun-Yen
- Occupation: Actress
- Years active: 1957-2019
- Awards: TVB Anniversary Awards – TVB Anniversary Awards for Lifetime Achievement (2004)

Chinese name
- Chinese: 梁舜燕
Transcriptions
Standard Mandarin
- Hanyu Pinyin: Liáng Shùnyàn
Yue: Cantonese
- Jyutping: Leung4 Seun3 Yin1

Lily Leung Shun-Yin (Chinese: 梁舜燕; 7 January 1929 – 13 August 2019) was a Hong Kong actress.

Born in Hong Kong Leung attended Belilios Public School.

== Career ==
Leung started her acting career in 1957. Leung appeared for Rediffusion Television (1957 to 1968 then from 1976 to 1982), ATV (1983 to 1988) as well as TVB (1968 to 1975 and again from 1989 to 2017). In 1988 she appeared in Bloodsport as Mrs Tanaka. Her husband was at risk for heart disease, and she publicly supported organizations working to cure it. Leung is credited with over 15 films.

== Filmography ==
=== Films ===
- 1974 Everyday Is Sunday
- 1975 The Happy Trio - Kiu's pose instructor
- 1975 No End of Surprises
- 1976 The Private Eyes - Mrs. Chu
- 1981 Wedding Bells, Wedding Belles - Mrs. Fa
- 1988 Bloodsport - Mrs. Tanaka

=== Television series ===
| Year | Name of Film | Role |
| 2003 | Not Just A Pretty Face | Wu Ying (鄔 瑩) |
| 2003 | In the Realm of Fancy | Empress |
| 2004 | When Rules Turn Loose | Mrs.Fok (霍太太) |
| 2004 | To Catch the Uncatchable | Lin |
| 2004 | Net Deception | Mrs. Ho (何太太) |
| 2005 | When Rules Turn Loose | Law Siu Fong 羅少芳 |
| 2005 | The Prince's Shadow | Cameo |
| 2005 | Lost in the Chamber of Love | Empress Dowager Shen (睿真皇太后) |
| 2005 | Just Love | Mrs. Leung (梁太太) |
| 2005 | Misleading Track | Dan Piu Hong 范飄香 |
| 2005 | Into Thin Air | Mrs. Fong (方太太) |
| 2006 | Bar Bender | Dai Kwan Ngo (戴群娥) |
| 2006 | La Femme Desperado | Yin (燕) |
| 2006 | Forensic Heroes | Grandmother Li (李婆婆) |
| 2006 | Maiden's Vow | Empress Chi Hei (慈禧太后) |
| 2006 | To Grow with Love | Lily |
| 2006 | Dicey Business | Lo Yin (盧燕) |
| 2007 | Heart of Greed | Wong Lai Mei (王麗薇) |
| 2008 | Best Selling Secrets | Lan (蘭) |
| 2008 | The Gentle Crackdown II | Leung Wong Si (梁王氏) |
| 2008 | Moonlight Resonance | Mrs. Yuen(袁太太) |
| 2008 | Catch Me Now | Mok Wai Lan (莫蕙蘭) |
| 2009 | Just Love II | Mrs. Leung (梁太太) |
| 2009 | Born Rich | Ma Cheung Wai Kiu (馬蔣卉翹) |
| 2010 | Gun Metal Grey | Mrs. Pao (包太太) |
| 2010 | 7 Days in Life | Miu So Kam (繆素琴) |
| 2010 | Sisters of Pearl | Ngan Yu-Yuk (顏如玉) |
| 2011 | 7 Days in Life | Miu So-kam, Nancy (繆素琴) |
| 2011 | Ghetto Justice | Tsui Kiu (徐嬌) |
| 2011 | Wax and Wane | Man Fa-tung (萬花彤) |
| 2011 | Lives of Omission | Chan Sam-mui (陳三妹) |
| 2012 | Highs and Lows | Gordon's mother |
| 2014 | Rear Mirror | Pauline Tse Hau Lin (謝巧蓮) |
| 2014 | Lady Sour | Chu On Nin (朱安寧) |
| 2015 | Brick Slaves | Elderly Lady Chat (七嬸) |
| 2015 | Momentary Lapse of Reason | Sister Yin (燕姑) |
| 2016 | A Fist Within Four Walls | Chor Ching-miu (左貞妙) |
| 2017 | Heart and Greed | Hui-Po Wan Kam (許寶韻琴) |
| 2017 | The Unholy Alliance | Ling Cheung Sau Ping (令蔣秀萍) |
| 2018 | Threesome | 范蘭茜 |
| 2018 | Succession War | Empress Xiaoshengxian |
| 2018 | Fist Fight | Jo Yim-fan (左艷芬) |
| 2019 | As Time Goes By | Chai Cheung Git Choi (齊張結彩) |
| 2019 | Justice Bao: The First Year | Sim (嬋) |
| 2019 | Wonder Women | Mrs. Mui (梅夫人) |
| 2019 | My Life As Loan Shark | Lo A-choi (羅亞彩) |
| 2020 | Of Greed And Ants | Tong Lo Suk Mei (唐羅淑美) |

== Personal life ==
On 13 August 2019, Leung died of cancer in the Hong Kong Buddhist Hospital in Hong Kong. She was 90 years old.
