= Murder Diary =

Hong Kong crime thriller

- 刑偵日記
- Genre: Crime; Thriller; Suspense
- Created by: Kwan Shu-ming
- Written by: Chu Kang-ki; Lau Siu-kwan
- Starring: Kara Wai; Vincent Wong; Philip Keung; Benjamin Yuen; Mandy Wong; Lai Lok-yi; Venus Wong; Joey Thye; Alice Chan; Hana Kuk; Shiga Lin
- Theme music composer: Alan Cheung; Alex Lau; Damon Chui
- Opening theme: Skylight (天窗) by Vincent Wong
- Ending theme: Trust Nobody (不相信別人) by Hana Kuk; Cared Too Much (太在意) by Shiga Lin; Butterfly Effect (蝴蝶效應) by Hana Kuk and Vincent Wong
- Country of origin: Hong Kong
- Original language: Cantonese
- No. of episodes: 25

Production
- Producer: Kwan Shu-ming
- Production location: Hong Kong
- Camera setup: Multi camera
- Running time: 45 minutes (per episode)
- Production company: TVB

Original release
- Network: TVB Jade
- Release: 28 June – 2 August 2021

Related
- Fraudsters; AI Romantic

Murder Diary is a Hong Kong crime thriller produced by Television Broadcasts Limited (TVB), starring Kara Wai, Vincent Wong, Philip Keung, Benjamin Yuen, Mandy Wong, Lai Lok-yi and Venus Wong as the main cast.

The drama first premiered on Youku, myTV Gold, TVB Anywhere, and Astro GO at 8:00 pm on 15 June 2021. It premiered 9:30 pm on TVB Jade and Astro AOD on 28 June and will air 10:15 pm starting from 19 July due to the Tokyo Olympic Games broadcast.

== Synopsis ==
Years ago, Yeung Bik-sum (Kara Wai), who suffered from schizophrenia, almost killed her son, Ip King-fung (Vincent Wong), and her daughter, Ip Long-ching (Joey Thye). This caused King-fung to suffer from Dissociative Identity Disorder. His split personality, Chu Kei (Vincent Wong), studied hard to be a handwriting expert and criminal profiler, who helped King-fung, an undercover agent, to uproot a criminal organisation.

Due to a series of complicated case, Chief Inspector of Police Kong Ching-fun (Lai Lok-yi) invited King-fung, psychiatrist Wai Yui-kit (Benjamin Yuen), bomb disposal officer Yau Ngan-sing (Mandy Wong) and forensic anthropologist Fong Yuen-chin (Venus Wong) to the Special Crime Unit. After being cured from Bipolar Disorder, Superintendent Nip Shan (Philip Keung) returned to lead the Special Crime Unit. Meanwhile, he found out that Bik-sum is linked to his wife Leung Yat-sze's (Alice Chan) disappearance...

== Cast and characters ==
=== Special Crime Unit ===
Cast	Role	Notes
Philip Keung	Nip Shan (聶山)	Superintendent of Police from the Crime Unit
Lai Lok-yi	Kong Ching-fun (江政勳)	Chief Inspector of Police from the Crime Unit
Mandy Wong	Yau Ngan-sing (游雁星)	Madam Sing; Senior Inspector of Police and No. 1 bomb disposal officer from the Explosive Ordnance Disposal Bureau
Vincent Wong	Ip King-fung (葉勁峰)	An undercover agent and Police Constable from the Crime Unit
Vincent Wong	Chu Kei (朱璣)	A graphologist and criminal profiler
Benjamin Yuen	Wai Yui-kit (韋睿傑)	Dr. Wai; A psychiatrist and criminal profiler
Venus Wong	Fong Yuen-chin (方菀芊)	A forensic anthropologist

=== Ip family ===
Cast	Role	Notes
Kara Wai	Yeung Bik-sum (楊碧芯)	King fung and Long-ching's mother Suffered from Schizophrenia
Vincent Wong	Ip King-fung (葉勁峰)	Bik-sum's son Long-ching's older brother Suffered from Dissociative Identity Disorder
Vincent Wong	Chu Kei (朱璣)	A split personality of King-fung
Vincent Wong	Matt	The original personality of King-fung, fell into a deep sleep since fourteen years old
Joey Thye	Ip Long-ching (葉朗晴)	Bik-sum's daughter King-fung's younger sister

=== Nip family ===
Cast	Role	Notes
Philip Keung	Nip Shan (聶山)	Yat-sze's husband, suffered from Bipolar Disorder after her disappearance
Alice Chan	Leung Yat-sze (梁日思)	Nip Shan's wife, left home three year ago

=== Other cast ===
- Hana Kuk as Hoi Nam (海藍), an editor of a fiction website.
- Shiga Lin as Cheung Hiu-man (張曉蔓), a forensic entomologist.

== Production ==
A blessing ceremony was held on 3 June 2020. Filming lasted from May to August 2020.

== Reception ==
The series was mostly praised in mainland China for its unconventional and unique plot. The cast, particularly Kara Wai, was highly praised for her acting. The series currently has a fair rating of 7.4 on Douban. It reached the top ten trending dramas in China, which is considered rare for Hong Kong dramas especially in recent years.

However, Hong Kong viewers found the plot to be too confusing and difficult to follow. For TVB's live broadcast, the series is rated the lowest of the year in viewership with its first week averaging 17.5 points, which was its highest, and its second week averaging 15.5 points. Early online streaming on several platforms may have had an impact on its ratings. Airing at a later time due to the 2021 Olympic Games, the series dipped to its lowest rating of 10.2 points, averaging 13.8 points overall, one of the lowest dramas in TVB's 54-year history. Despite this, actor Vincent Wong thanked fans on social media for their support for the series.

== Sequel ==
On 14 March 2022, TVB confirmed that a sequel, Murder Diary Series 2, is in the works. It was announced as 1 of 4 sequels and 1 of 14 dramas in the pre-production stage at the FilMart marketing event.
