= List of Gun Metal Grey episodes =

Gun Metal Grey is a 2010 Hong Kong police procedural television serial drama starring Felix Wong and Michael Miu. Produced by Terry Tong and edited by Lau Choi-wan and Leung Yan-tung, Gun Metal Grey is a TVB production.

== Episodes ==
No.	Title	Directed by	Written by	Original release date
1	"Mad testifies against Stone"	Chan San-hap	Story by : Lau Choi-wan & Leung Yan-tung; Teleplay by : Lam Chung-bong	1 November 2010
Fifteen years ago, CID sergeant Shek Tung-sing (nicknamed "Stone") was sentenced to a lifelong jail term after he was accused of murdering a defendant lawyer and his wife at their home. At the time, Stone's on-and-off good friend Mai On-ting (nicknamed "Mad") was the only witness of the murder. Fifteen years later, Stone discovers a piece of evidence that is strong enough to prove his innocence after reading a magazine article written by Kim Hui. He is released from prison and resumes working as a CID sergeant.
2	"Stone secretly investigates"	Chan San-hap	Story by : Lau Choi-wan & Leung Yan-tung; Teleplay by : Tsang Po-wah	2 November 2010
Stone is sent to work in Special Crime Unit Team A, which is supervised by Mad, now a Senior Inspector. Stone suspects Mad to be one of the few suspects that is responsible for framing him. Team A discovers a body of a young woman (Shum Po-yee) inside a kitchen stove that is enclosed with cement. They suspect that her husband (Chan Tik-hak), who is the first to discover her body, is the killer. They bring him in for questioning, but he is quickly released due to the lack of evidence. A few nights later, the team discovers the husband hanged at his apartment and concludes that his suicide was actually a murder. After further investigation, they find that Shum's "cousin" was actually a past boyfriend who killed the couple in a fit of rage.: Based on the "Kitchen stove murder case" (灶底藏屍案) in 1975.

== Viewership ratings ==
The following is a list of rating points based on television viewership. "HK viewers in millions" refers to the number of people, derived from the average rating, in Hong Kong who watched the episode live.

Week	Episode(s)	Average points	Peaking points	HK viewers (in millions)	References
1	1	30	—	1.91	
1	2 — 5	30	—	1.91	
2	6 — 10	30	32	1.91	

== See also ==
- Gun Metal Grey
- List of Gun Metal Grey characters
