= Fist Fight (TV series) =

- Poster
- 兄弟
- Genre: Action; Crime Thriller
- Created by: Lam Chi-wah
- Starring: Vincent Wong; Mat Yeung; Philip Ng; Kaman Kong; Rebecca Zhu; Tiffany Lau; Shek Sau; Toby Chan; Albert Cheung; Chun Wong
- Opening theme: 非凡 by Vincent Wong
- Ending theme: 別再怕 by Hana Kuk
- Country of origin: Hong Kong
- Original language: Cantonese
- No. of episodes: 30

Production
- Producers: Lam Chi-wah; Yip Tin Shing
- Production locations: Hong Kong; United Kingdom; Philippines
- Running time: approx. 43 min
- Production company: Television Broadcasts Limited

Original release
- Network: TVB Jade
- Release: 12 November – 23 December 2018

Fist Fight (Chinese: 兄弟) is a 2018 action drama produced by TVB, starring Vincent Wong, Mat Yeung, Philip Ng, Kaman Kong, Rebecca Zhu and Tiffany Lau as the main cast.

The plot focused on three brothers who were separated due to events occurring during the 1991 financial crisis. After reuniting years later, they are trapped in a big conspiracy plot.

== Plot ==
Cheung Fei Fan ( Vincent Wong ), Ha Tin Hang (Mat Yeung) and Ho Tit Nam (Philip Ng) were brothers who have been separated for many years. When the three were young, their lives changed because of the 1991 Hong Kong financial crisis. Many years later, they reunited and slowly found out that there was a great conspiracy in the past caused by the Former financial crisis response team now known as the Knights Club as they tried to uncover the truth behind their parents' death that has been covered up as a suicide case.

== Cast ==
=== Main characters ===
| Cast | Role | Description |
|---|---|---|
| Vincent Wong 王浩信 | Cheung Fei Fan 張非凡 | Fever; Internet Network cult leader Your Flyingman Tech Company Founder / Chairman; Fire Fist Fight Boxing Tournament Producer; The Shareholder of Wilson Secure Solution Company; Second Younger brother of Iron and older brother of Leo; Love interest of Sitting |
| Mat Yeung 楊明 | Ha Tin Hang 夏天行 | Leo; Former British M9 agent / Informant; Wilson Secure Solution Company Private bodyguard Supervisor; Youngest brother of Iron and Fever; Love interest of Zero |
| Philip Ng 伍允龍 | Ho Tit Nam 何鐵男 | Iron; Former CID Sergeant; He was the Wilson Secure Solution Company Rookie Bodyguard boxer Older brother of Fever and Leo; Fiancée of Young Ching Ching; Shot and killed by Raymond in Episode 27; Returns in Episode 30 as a virtual representation to assist Fever in the Virtual reality battle against Pong Si-Kai. (Deceased in Episode 27) |
| Kaman Kong 江嘉敏 | Ma Sze Ting 馬斯婷 | Sitting; Former rich girl Wilson Secure Solution Company Private Security officer → Wilson Secure Solution Company Private rookie Bodyguard → Fever's assistant Love Interest of Fever inherited Dementia Family illness Went missing after protecting Fever from John killing him while he in the VR world in the final episode |
| Rebecca Zhu 朱晨麗 | Yeung Ching Ching 楊青青 | Madam Young; Chief Inspector of the International Police; Fiancé of Ho Tit Nam |
| Tiffany Lau 劉穎鏇 | Chan Ling 陳鈴 | Zero; Former rookie boxer turned coach Briefly had a crush on Iron; Love Interest of Leo |

=== Knights Club (騎士會) ===
| Cast | Role | Description |
|---|---|---|
| Shek Sau 石修 | Wan Shing Hang 尹成亨 | Hunter; CEO of Si Morning Post; Former Chairman of the 1991 Financial Crisis Response Team; Chairman of the Knights Club; Shot and killed by Raymond in Episode 27 Villain but repented |
| Lily Poon 潘芳芳 | Po Fan Cheuk-wah 蒲范卓樺 | Winnie; Secretary for Security; Former 1991 Financial Crisis Response Team member Founding Member of Knights Club |
| Geoffrey Wong 黃子雄 | Ngan Sai Chu 顏世柱 | NG; Director of Public Prosecutions; Former 1991 Financial Crisis Response Team member Founding Member of Knights Club |
| Parkman Wong 黃栢文 | To King Sun 杜景新 | Assistant Commissioner of Police; Ousted from Knights Club and forced to resign in Episode 23 |
| Ngai Wai Man 魏惠文 | Tsang Shum Ming 曾審銘 | Permanent Judge of the Court of Final Appeal |
| Yu Chi Ming 余子明 | Yu Lap Chi 余立知 | Dean of the University of Hong Kong School of Business |
| Paul Gare 紀保羅 | Fok Yiu Chung 霍耀聰 | Descendant of One of Hong Kong's Prestigious Family |
| Chisoen Hung 洪資訊 | Cheng Hoi Yuen 鄭海源 | President of the Hong Kong Medical Association |
| Timothy Cheng 鄭子誠 | Chin Kwok Fung 展國鋒 | Raymond; COO of Wilson Secure Solution Company; Former Special Branch Inspector of Police; Former 1991 Financial Crisis Response Team member Previously secretly aided the Knights Club; officially joined in Episode 24; Killed by Pong Si Kai for revenge of being the mastermind of kidnapping his son years ago through the VR world in Episode 29 Villain |

=== Cheung family ===
| Cast | Role | Description |
|---|---|---|
| Albert Cheung 張武孝 | Cheung Tai Wing 張大榮 | Big Big Brother; Adoptive father of Cheung Fei Fan; Former triad leader Film company owner |
| Janice Shum 沈可欣 | Cheung Choi Yiu 張彩瑤 | Yolanda; Adoptive older sister of Fever; Got kidnapped by Cheung Man Kei in episode 13 to blackmail Fever from getting his way. |
| Vincent Wong 王浩信 | Cheung Fei Fan 張非凡 | Fever; Internet Network cult leader Your Flyingman Tech Company Founder / Chairman; Fire Fist Fight Boxing Tournament Producer; Shareholder of Wilson Secure Solution Company; Second Younger brother of Iron and older brother of Leo |

=== Ho family ===
| Cast | Role | Description |
|---|---|---|
| Rosanne Lui 呂珊 | Yip Lai Fung 葉麗鳳 | Sister Li; Temple Street singer turn restaurant owner Iron's God/Adoptive mother |
| Philip Ng 伍允龍 | Ho Tit Nam 何鐵男 | Iron; Former CID Sergeant; Wilson Secure Solution Company Rookie Bodyguard; Boxer; Older brother of Fever and Leo; Fiancée of Yeung Ching Ching; Shot and killed by Raymond in Episode 27 |

=== Ma family ===
| Cast | Role | Description |
|---|---|---|
| Lily Leung 梁舜燕 | Tso Yim Fan 左艷芬 | Diana; Grandmother of Sitting; Has Dementia illness |
| Kaman Kong 江嘉敏 | Ma Sze Ting 馬斯婷 | Sitting; Former rich girl Wilson Secure Solution Company Private Security officer → Wilson Secure Solution Company Private rookie Bodyguard → Fever's assistant Love Interest of Fever inherited Dementia Family illness Went missing after protecting Fever from John killing him while he in the VR world in the final episode |

=== Chan family ===
| Cast | Role | Description |
|---|---|---|
| Savio Tsang 曾偉權 | Chan Loi 陳來 | Former producer of false passport Now as meat stall owner |
| Tiffany Lau 劉穎鏇 | Chan Ling 陳鈴 | Zero; Former rookie boxer turned coach Briefly had a crush on Iron. Love Interest of Leo |

=== Other cast members ===
| Cast | Role | Description |
|---|---|---|
| Toby Chan 陳庭欣 | Lui Wai Bing 呂慧冰 | Olivia; Former British M9 Informant; Wilson Secure Solution Company Private Bodyguard Senior officer Good friend of Leo and Stone. Murdered in episode 24 after finding out Stone's secret |
| Quinn Ho 何君誠 | Shek Tung Shing | Stone; Former British M9 agent Wilson Secure Solution Company Private Bodyguard Senior officer Good friend of Leo and Olivia. Revealed in episode 24 that he has a secret agenda and a motive of getting close to Leo Villain but repented |
| Chun Wong 秦煌 | Cheung Man Kei 蔣萬祺 | Richmond; Business magnate Enemy of Fever and Hunter; Secretly uses illegal business method to profit money Hunter used him as a scapegoat for murder of Fever, Iron, and Leo's biological parents' death shot and killed by a police officer when he tries to flee from getting arrested in episode 24 Villain |
| Jack Hui 許家傑 | Chui Tak Po 徐德寶 | Double; Fever's special assistant and good friend Founding member of Your Flyingman Tech Company and employee Pretend to be the long lost brother of Iron and Leo under the request of Fever; Killed in Episode 28 after entering VR world to find out secret identity contact of Raymond |
| Poon Chi-Man 潘志文 | Pong Si Kai | Soron; Former Business magnate Hacker and Evil Mastermind behind the dark web, VR world Enemy of the three brothers and Knights Club the Secret Boss of Raymond, Stone, & John; Tries to start a financial crisis & finally arrested by Madam Young in the final episode Main Villain referencing George Soros. |
| Stephen Huynh | John Smith | Smith; British M9 agent Revealed to be working for Pong Si Kai in the final episode Has been leading Leo to find his birth identify and going back to Hong Kong under the order of Pong Si Kai Villain |
| Chloe Yuen 阮兒 | Faye 劉 菲 | Faye; 1 of 3 the assistants to Cheung Man Kei shot and killed by police in episode 24 |

== Music ==
| Title | Type | Composer | Lyrics | Arranger | Producer(s) | Performer |
|---|---|---|---|---|---|---|
| Extraordinary brothers (非凡) | Opening theme | Alan Cheung | Sandy Chang | Alan Cheung | Herman Ho; Joseph Wei | Vincent Wong |
| 別再怕 | Ending theme | Damon Chui | Sandy Chang | Joseph Wei | Herman Ho; Joseph Wei | Hana Kuk |
| My Light In You | - | Zarni | Zarni | Randall Michael Tobin | Randall Michael Tobin | Zarni |
| All The King's Horses | - | - | - | Deep Wave | - | - |
