= Sergeant Tabloid =

Hong Kong television series

- Promotional poster
- Genre: Romantic comedy Action; Crime thriller
- Written by: Kwan Ho-yuet
- Starring: Niki Chow; Michael Tse; Mandy Wong; Matthew Ko; Océane Zhu; Koni Lui; Grace Wong; Benz Hui; Queenie Chu; Ching Hor-wai; Angelina Lo; William Chak; Candice Chiu
- Opening theme: Jung Sam Dim (中心點) by Michael Tse and Niki Chow Unknown instrumental music(Overseas edition/DVD)
- Country of origin: Hong Kong
- Original language: Cantonese
- No. of episodes: 21

Production
- Producer: Nelson Cheung
- Production location: Hong Kong
- Camera setup: Multi camera
- Production company: TVB

Original release
- Network: Jade, HD Jade
- Release: 11 March – 5 April 2013

Related
- Season of Love; Bullet Brain

Sergeant Tabloid
- Traditional Chinese: 女警愛作戰
- Simplified Chinese: 女警爱作战
- Literal meaning: "Female Police Officers's Love Battlefield"
Transcriptions
Standard Mandarin
- Hanyu Pinyin: Nǚ Jíng Ài Zuō Zhán
Yue: Cantonese
- Jyutping: Neoi2 Ging2 Ngoi3 Zok3 Zin3

Sergeant Tabloid is a Hong Kong television drama produced by TVB under executive producer Nelson Cheung. The drama tells the story of female police officers of the Hong Kong Police Force, using their perspectives to look at issues of modern women experience in society. Sergeant Tabloid first aired on TVB's overseas affiliates and partners from 2 to 27 April 2012.

The first episode premiered on Hong Kong's Jade and HD Jade channels on 11 March 2013.

Sergeant Tabloid has been well received by overseas viewers, and TVB has plans to produce a sequel.

== Production ==
A costume fitting press conference and blessing ceremony was held on 25 November 2011 at Tseung Kwan O TVB City Studio One Parking Lot at 3:00 pm where filming began. Filming is estimated to be completed on 3 February.

== Synopsis ==
Lui Fei-hap (Niki Chow), known as "Lui Hap", is a thirty-one-year-old Emergency Unit sergeant of the Hong Kong Police Force, who has been let down in love many times; so when she finds her perfect man (Vincent Wong) she jumps at the opportunity, never suspecting that he is a drug baron until she arrests him.

To make things worse their relationship hits the headlines when tabloid reporter Gordon Lam (Michael Tse), known as A1, stumbles upon it while following another story. Lui Hap's and A1's paths continue to cross when pursuing duties and stories, sometimes co-operating and sometimes as enemies, sometimes saving the other and at other times the target of each other's practical jokes. A mother goose to her section, Lui Hap comes into conflict with her new commanding officer Madam Kiu (Mandy Wong), nicknamed by her subordinates as Madam Kill, when Kiu demands perfection of her section.

Before long Lui Hap finds herself falling in love with new recruit Wong Tze-tsuen (Matthew Ko), only for A1 to stand in her way again. Pushed to her limits both at work and in love, Lui Hap has no choice but to fight back in the name of love.

== Cast and characters ==
- Niki Chow as Sergeant Lui Fei-hap (呂霏俠; Leoi Feihap), known as Lui Hap (呂俠; Leoihap), a romantically conscious female sergeant of the West Kowloon Emergency Unit (EU) police force. "Lui Hap" is a play on the Cantonese word for "female hero" .(女俠; jyutping: neoi5hap6). Her name "Lui Fei-hap" sounds similar to "flying female hero" (女飛俠) in Cantonese. Tung Siu Leung's ex-girlfriend, Wong Tse Tsuen's ex-girlfriend, A1's rival, later girlfriend.
- Michael Tse as "A1" Lam (藍一一; Laam Jatjat), a reporter for the tabloid newspaper "Boom Daily." He consistently finds ways to have Lui Hap hit the headlines. Lui Hap's rival, later boyfriend. Wong Tze-tsuen's cousin.
- Mandy Wong as Inspector Szeto Kiu (司徒驕; Sitou Giu), known as Madam Kiu, the cold and resolute inspector of West Kowloon's Emergency Unit, and Lui Hap's supervisor. She was a former inspector working in the Airport Security Unit. Wong Tze Tsuen's girlfriend
- Matthew Ko as Constable Wong Tze-tsuen (王子傳; Wong Zicyun), known as Prince (王子; wongzi), a new young recruit to West Kowloon's Emergency Unit. He is the primary love interest for both Lui Hap and Madam Kiu. Szeto Kiu's boyfriend. A1's cousin.
- Océane Zhu as Constable Lam Oi-oi (藍愛愛; Laam Oioi), A1's younger half-sister. Born in Hong Kong and raised in Taiwan, Oi becomes a police officer in Hong Kong in order for a chance to meet with A1. Yau Man Chi's love interest, later girlfriend. Wong Tze-tsuen's cousin.
- Queenie Chu as Constable Mai Ka-po (米家寶; Mai Gaabou), an officer of the Traffic Branch Headquarters (TBH) of the West Kowloon Police Force and one of Lui Hap's best friends.
- Koni Lui as Constable Lam Long-ning (林朗寧; Lam Longning), known as Long Leg, a police officer of West Kowloon's Emergency Unit and one of Lui Hap's best friends.
- Grace Wong as Constable Kam Sui-na (金瑞娜; Gam Seoinaa), known as Goldie, an officer of West Kowloon's Emergency Unit and one of Lui Hap's best friends.
- William Chak as Constable Yau Man-chi (游漫池; Yau Maanci), known as Delay Gor, an officer who has a crush on Oi-oi, later boyfriend.
- Benz Hui as "Boy Sir" Lui Tsan-nam (呂鎮男; Leoi Zannaam), Lui Hap's father and a retired officer of the VIP Protection Unit (VIPPU) of the Hong Kong Police Force. Pat Ling Lung's husband.
- Angelina Lo as "Sister Ten" Pat Ling-lung (畢玲瓏; Bat Linglung), Lui Hap's mother and a retired police inspector. Lui Tsan Nam's wife.
- Ching Hor-wai as Sung Wai-sing (宋慧星; Sung Waising), A1's mother who works as a provider for background actors. Her name is inspired by Shin Hye-sung, a member of the South Korean boy band Shinhwa.
- Jason Pai Piau as Szeto Wai (司徒威; Sitou Wai), Madam Kiu's father.
- Candice Chiu as Constable Tong Mei-kei (唐美琪; Tong Meikei), known as Miki, one of Lui Hap's best friends.
- Ha Ping as Lee Song (李爽; Lei Song), A1's grandmother.
- Rosanne Lui as Sung Wai-kiu (宋慧橋; Sung Waikiu), A1's aunt. Her name is the Cantonese transliteration of South Korean actress Song Hye-kyo.
- Eric Chung as Ngai Shu-sang (倪書生; Ngai Syusang), A1's boss. His name is a wordplay of the Cantonese phrase "fake scholar." (偽書生)
- Brian Tse as "Big Eyes" Tai Tung-man (戴東民; Daai Dungman), a news reporter for Boom Daily.
- Vincent Wong guest stars in the first and last episode as Tung Siu-leung (董兆良; Dung Siuloeng), Lui Hap's ex-boyfriend and is a drug baron and undercover police (revealed in the finale)
- Chow Chung guest stars in the second episode as Grandpa Tung (通伯), a man who has been selling Hong Kong style egg waffles in the Mongkok streets for twenty years.
- Elaine Yiu guest stars (Ep:19–21) as a mentally unstable arsonist who kidnapped and tried to kill Lui Hap.

== Broadcasts ==
Sergeant Tabloid is the first TVB drama to premiere on a Mainland Chinese streaming website before an official release in Hong Kong. TVB's overseas affiliates and distributors expressed great interest in buying the show, and Sergeant Tabloid received a wide overseas release on 2 April 2012.

International cable broadcasters carrying the show include:

- Australia – TVBJ
- China – PPS.tv (online streaming)
- Malaysia – Astro on Demand
- United Kingdom – TVBS-Europe
- United States – TVBe

== Music ==
The theme song "Ngoi Chung Sam " (愛從心; lit. "Love From the Heart "), performed by Michael Tse and Niki Chow, was recorded for the Hong Kong release. Previously releases only included an instrumental as the opening theme.

== Viewership ratings ==
Week	Episodes	Date	Average Points	Peaking Points
1	01－04	11–15 March 2013	28	32
2	05－09	18–22 March 2013	27	30
3	10－14	25–29 March 2013	28	32
4	15－19	1–5 April 2013	28	32
	20－21	1–5 April 2013	28	34
