= Brick Slaves =

Hong Kong television series

- Official poster
- Also known as: Flat Slave
- 樓奴
- Genre: Modern Drama, Comedy, Romance
- Created by: Hong Kong Television Broadcasts Limited
- Written by: Chan Pui-wah, Siu Gwok-wah, Chan Bou-wah, Chan Hoi-keung
- Directed by: Ng Koon-yue
- Starring: Vincent Wong; Selena Lee; Evergreen Mak; Eliza Sam; Kiki Sheung; Rachel Kan; Matthew Ho; KK Cheung; C-Kwan; Toby Chan
- Theme music composer: Dominic Chu
- Opening theme: 400 Feet (四百呎) by Edwin Siu
- Country of origin: Hong Kong
- Original language: Cantonese
- No. of episodes: 20

Production
- Executive producer: Catherine Tsang
- Producer: Law Chun-ngok
- Production location: Hong Kong
- Editor: Lam Lai-Mei
- Camera setup: Multi camera
- Running time: 45 minutes
- Production company: TVB

Original release
- Network: TVB Jade, HD Jade
- Release: 3 August – 28 August 2015

Brick Slaves
- Chinese: 樓奴
- Literal meaning: "Flat Slave"
Transcriptions
Standard Mandarin
- Hanyu Pinyin: Lóu Nú
Yue: Cantonese
- Yale Romanization: Làuh Nòuh
- Jyutping: Lau4 Nou4

Brick Slaves (Chinese: 樓奴; Jyutping: Lau4 Nou4; Cantonese Yale: Làuh Nòuh; literally "Flat Slave") is a 2015 Hong Kong romantic-comedy television drama created and produced by TVB, starring Vincent Wong and Selena Lee as the main leads. Filming took place from August to October 2014. The drama is broadcast on Hong Kong's Jade and HD Jade channels from August 3 till August 28, 2015 every Monday through Friday during its 8:30-9:30 pm timeslot with a total of 20 episodes.

== Synopsis ==
The drama is a comedic view of the high cost of living and struggles regular Hong Kong citizens go through in order to be able to own property in modern Hong Kong society

Jack Lau Yiu-ming (Vincent Wong) and his girlfriend Annie (Toby Chan) diligently saves up enough to purchase a flat to plan their future together. In order to make their monthly mortgage payment the two live an extremely frugal lifestyle where they can't spend on extra luxuries. When Jack proposes to Annie at the flat he secretly newly purchased with their savings, she breaks up with him and confesses about her other fiancée who already owns a paid off luxury flat. Jack's friend Au Mei-nam (C-Kwan), who owns a bar sets up singles night at his bar hoping Jack will get back into dating. The only female that catches his attention is a lady who complains about how awful the food being served tastes.

Jack, still devastated by his break up with Annie decides to splurge on his hobby. On the day he is to pay and pick up his splurge, bad luck after bad luck happens. First he and a work associate gets robbed at a parking lot. While chasing the robber he damages House Lo Bit-tat's (Evergreen Mak) car. Later Jack finds out the company he works for deals in illegal activities and all upper management has been arrested by the police. With the company he works for out of business he starts his search for a new job with no luck. Jack applies to All In One Property Management, a company that manages and rents property, as a Supervisor desperate to find a job even though he has no prior property management experience. He messes up even before his interview starts when he barges into CEO Joyce Lei Oi-wah's (Kiki Sheung), private elevator. Joyce demands Jack to be fired even if he is not an employee with the company. House, who is upper management at All In One Property Management, recognizes Jack and further embarrasses him in front of others during the interview process. While sulking at another unsuccessful job interview Jack sees a girl fall into the bay. He saves her and lectures her about the importance of life, as the two part they accidentally switch cellphones by mistake.

When Jack returns home that day he finds a new occupant in his home. It seems his ex-girlfriend Annie rented her half of his home to her friend Cecilia Choi Kin-ching (Selena Li), in order to help Jack with the mortgage and hopefully get her share of the flat payback to her sooner. Cecilia was forced out of her family home when her younger brother got married. Before renting half of Jack's flat she was living out of a storage locker. The two get off on the wrong foot and soon Cecilia makes Jack's life miserable by setting up boundaries and strict rules at his home. Later Jack finds out Cecilia was also the lady complaining of the awful food at Mei-nam's bar.

Jack's luck takes a turn when he is called back to All In One Property Management and offered the position of general manager; he becomes House's new boss. To his surprise, Jack can't figure out how he got hired as the general manager since his interview was a failure and he has no prior property management experience. To House's disappointment, he was deemed to become the new general manager and had told his family and co-workers about it. House continues to lie to his family with only his wife knowing he didn't get promoted. House tries to mend his and Jack's work relationship but Jack sees through House's act and warns him about his approach.

As it turns out Jack was hired because the girl he saved Peggy Suk Bik-gei (Eliza Sam) is Joyce's niece who just returned to Hong Kong from Canada. Joyce had someone tail Peggy and saw Jack's act of kindness when he saved Peggy's life. Peggy returned to Hong Kong to fulfill her late mother's wish, to have her ashes spread in the Hong Kong Bay and study Chinese history at a university. To fulfill a university requirement she also works as an Intern at All In One under Jack's department.

== Cast ==
=== All In One Property Management staff ===
- Kiki Sheung as Joyce Lei Oi-wah (利愛華)

CEO of All In One, a company that owns luxury to lower end real-estate properties and then rents it out to residences. An extremely private and controlling person who doesn't like her employees knowing about her private life. When an employee comes to visit her at the hospital on a confidential stay, she fires him on the spot. She is also overly protective of Peggy who is her late friend's daughter and her husbands illegitimate daughter. When Jack saves Peggy from drowning she offers him a senior management position at her company even though she originally didn't want him hired at all.

- KK Cheung as Martin Chow Gwan-nin (鄒君年)

Joyce's husband and a Senior Manager at All In One. He is also a former schoolmate and close friend to House. Due to Joyce's illness he helps her handle all of her business affairs. Due to Joyce's controlling ways she prevents him from acknowledging Peggy as his biological daughter. He and Joyce started their relationship when she paid off his failed business debts.

- Vincent Wong as Jack Lau Yiu-ming (樓耀明; a pun on "the flat is taking my life")

His nickname is Jinxed Ming because he always goes through a string of bad luck. His longtime girlfriend Annie, who had another boyfriend on the side, finally dumps him because he used their savings to purchase a flat she didn't like. The last company he worked for dealt in illegal activities. During his interview at All In One he was fired by Joyce even before his interview started. Joyce later hires him as a General Manager because he saved her niece Peggy from drowning. He becomes House's new boss. He becomes housemates with Cecilia when Annie rents her half of his flat to Cecilia. Cecilia and Jack become instant enemies due to misunderstandings but later becomes friends due to their love of food. Once he gains Joyce's trust, she tasked him with looking after Peggy.

- Evergreen Mak as House Lo Bit-tat (勞必達)

A Property Supervisor at All In One. He buys small gifts and treats meals to staffs at All In One to get on everyone's good side. When his boss gets fired he thinks he is destined for the promotion of the General Manager position until he finds out Jack, whom he had an earlier unpleasant confrontation with, becomes his new boss. Jack sees through his fake act and slacking at work. He acknowledges to be Peggy's biological father according to a one night stand he had with her mother Mei-yiu years ago. He asked that his relation to Peggy be kept a secret in order not to affect his family. In truth he is not her father and has no relation at all to Peggy, he only lied because Joyce helped him settled his lawsuit and she blackmails firing him if he won't do so. Joyce also later tasked him to persuade Peggy to move back to Canada. (See Lo family section for further details)

- Eliza Sam as Peggy Suk Bik-gei (祝碧姬)

Joyce's late best friend's daughter that just returned from Canada. She arrives in Hong Kong to bring her late mother's ashes back and study Chinese history at a University. She also works as an Intern at All In One in Jack's department. House's son Dou-lok, who is a University schoolmate of hers likes her but she likes Jack. Wanting to impress Jack she takes up piano lessons with Cecilia. She later reveals she is House's biological daughter with DNA proof and an award medal from a soccer match that belongs to him. After acknowledging that he is Peggy's biological father due to a one night stand with her mother Mei-yiu, he ask their relation be kept a secret in order to not affect his family. Jack becomes aware that House is her father due to their over adoration for each other at work. After rejecting Dou-dou she decides to actively pursue Jack since he knows she likes him.

- Fanny Ip as Cindy Fung Yuet-sin (馮月仙)

Joyce's trusted and reliable personal assistant at All In One. She often warns House of any issues at work because she is close friends with him since he gifts her with beauty products provided by his wife.

- Albert Law as Brother Biu (標哥)

The former General Manager who was in Jack's current position. He gets fired on the spot when he visits Joyce on a confidential hospital stay to try to flatter her.

- Janice Shum as Chu Yan-oi (招仁愛; homophone to "attract people to love")

A clerk in the property management department.

- Alvis Lo as Gwok-bong (國邦)

A clerk in the property management department.

- Hiroki Hong as Chung (昌)

A former clerk in the property management department. He resigns from his position because he says his income prevents him from applying for public housing.

- Ngai Wai-man as Brother Sai Lei (犀利哥)

All In One's repairman. He is in charge of repairing any damages to all of All In One's properties.

- Desmond Pang as Desmond

Martin's personal driver.

=== Lo family ===
- Chung Chow as Johnny Lo Man-bou (勞萬步)

House's father and Kimchi Wong Kam-hei's husband. Being a filial son, House takes care of his parents expenses. Due to his wife's hand injury they moved in with their son House's family so his daughter-in-law can take care of them. While living at his son's home, he and his wife accidentally push out a window onto the pedestrian sidewalk which resulted in House getting sued.

- Helena Law as Kimchi Wong Kam-hei (黃金喜)

House's mother and Lo Man-bou's wife. Being a filial son, House takes care of his parents expenses. Due to her hand injury, she and her husband move into their son's home so their daughter-in-law can take care of them. While living at her son's home, she and her husband accidentally push out a window onto the pedestrian sidewalk which resulted in House getting sued.

- Evergreen Mak as House Lo Bit-tat (勞必達)

Mary Chu Ma-lei's husband and Lo Dou-lok's father. Unhappy at work because his new boss Jack who insist on doing everything correctly by the books, he constantly wants to quit his job. He endures his work because of family expenses. His understanding wife Mary helps him ease his stress by hearing all his problems at work.

- Rachel Kan as Mary Chu Ma-lei (朱瑪莉)

House's wife and Lo Dou-lok's mother. She is an understanding wife that helps her husband anyway possible to advance his career. She sells beauty product part-time from home. Originally wanting to be able to take care of her in-laws, she has them move into her home only to regret it when they make life unbearable for her. She is an over caring mother to Dou-dou which results in him still acting childish around her.

- Matthew Ho as Lo Dou-lok (勞多樂)

House and Mary's University age son. Everyone calls him Dou-dou. He is immature and does not have his future planned after graduation. He is also Peggy's school mate and has a crush on her. Unable to stand his grandparents living at his home he moves in with Peggy and Winter, sleeping on their couch. When confessing to Peggy, she truthfully tells him that she only thinks of him as a friend and that the person she likes is Jack, but his clueless personality thinks that Peggy rejected him because she thinks he is her half brother.

=== Choi family ===
- Rainbow Ching as Tsang Suet-mui (曾雪梅)

Cecilia and Wing-ching's mother. She sells tofu products and bean sprouts at a street market stall. Jack is a frequent customer of hers.

- Selena Li as Cecilia Choi Kin-ching (蔡堅菁)

Tsang Suet-mui's daughter and Choi Wing-ching's older sister. She is forced to move out of the family home when her younger brother gets married. With no place affordable to live, she was living out of her storage locker. She is friends and former high school classmate of Jack's former girlfriend Annie. Annie rents her half of the flat to Cecilia hoping to help Jack with the mortgage and get re-payment of her half of the flat sooner. She works as a piano teacher and volunteers at a senior home.

- Penny Chan as Choi Wing-ching (蔡永青)

Tsang Suet-mui's son, Cecilia's younger brother and Si Nga's soon-to-be husband. He is selfish and doesn't consider about others. In order to obtain a flat he tries to have his sister sign a mortgage loan for him.

- Devily Leung as Si Nga (施雅)

Choi Wing-ching's pregnant soon-to-be wife. Due to the Choi family home having limited space she pushes her soon-to-be mother in law to kick Cecilia out of their home.

=== All In One tenants ===
- C-Kwan as Au Mei-nam (區美男 homophone to European and American man)

Jack's best friend. He works as a bartender and likes to set up speed dating night at the bar he works at to help Jack find a new girlfriend and for him to meet girls. He is also a tenant of an All In One sub divided property and becomes neighbors with Yu Sau-hing and her daughter when they move in. He and Sau-hing later become a couple and move in together.

- Mandy Lam as Yu Sau-hing (余秀卿)

A single mother who refused to sell her home to All In One and its competitor. House finds out she is not the real homeowner and that it is owned by her former lover Tsang Mou-wan. When her late lover's son Tsang Siu-keung tries to sell her flat to All In One's competitor, All In One helps her legally gain the property. After All In One helps her work out family matters with Mou-wan's adult son Siu-keung, she gains full possession of the flat, but decides to sell it to ease her burden in order to spend more time with her daughter and be more financially secure. After selling her flat she moves into an All In One sub divided property and becomes neighbors with Au Mei-nam.

- Suki Lam as Tsang Siu-huen (曾小圓)

Tsang Mou-wan and Yu Sau-hing's preteen daughter. Tsang Siu-keung half sister. She meets Au Mei-nam at her school yard while playing rock, paper, scissors. She finds out he is also her neighbor and strikes up a friendship with Mei-nam when her mother is hospitalized for exhaustion and he is left to care for her. Once Mei-nam and her mother becomes a couple he becomes a father figure to her.

- Even Chan as Winter

Peggy's University schoolmate and roommate. She resides with Peggy at the luxury apartment Joyce rented at a discount to Peggy.

- Ricky Wong as Ko Tai-wai (高大威; homophone to "tall, big and powerful")

A renter of All In One's sub divided low level properties. When Peggy accidentally damages his laptop he demands All In One replace the pictures in his computer.

- David Do as Mr. Ng (吳生)

A renter of All In One's sub divided low level properties. He complains about the foul smell of the apartment and his neighbor throwing out all his right shoes.

- Mikako Leung as Housewife Fong (方師奶)

A renter of All In One's sub divided low level properties. She throws out all of her neighbor's right shoes to retaliate for him being noisy.

- Joseph Yeung as Cheng Kai-man (程啟民)

Peggy's estranged step-father. He is the renter of a luxury property. He comes up with excuses after excuses in order to not have to pay rent. He is also a con-artist and tries to extort money from Joyce.

- Kayi Cheung as Nana Che Bou-na (車寶娜)

A Hong Kong celebrity that purchased one of All In One's luxury flats. While renovating the flat she just purchased she rents another All In One luxury flat across from Peggy. After finding out Peggy's connection to Joyce she plans a devious plan to extort money from All In One by pretending Peggy flushed her fake diamond ring down the toilet. Joyce has her sugar daddy's wife Tracy make a fool out of her.

- Oscar Li as Dai Man-mo (戴文武)

A former tenant of All In One's sub divided low level properties. He is a money counterfeiter and diamond thief. Dou-dou stayed at his former residence when he ran away from home.

- Hebe Chan as Hui Ka-ka (許冰冰)

A pregnant young lady who rents a luxury apartment across from Peggy to hide from Anthony Chiang, who hired her as a surrogate mother to give birth to an heir. After finding out the child she gave birth to is a girl he pays her off and does not want any ties to the child.

- Leo Tsang as Brother Fat (發哥)

Owner and manager of the cafe the All In One employees like to frequent. The space of his cafe is owned by All in One, after Joyce finds out the low rent Martin rents to the cafe she tries to evict the cafe.

- Jenny Wong as Mrs. Fat (發嫂)

Brother Fat's wife. She works as a cashier at the cafe she and her husband owns.

=== Extended cast ===
- Toby Chan as Annie Tong On-nei (唐安妮)

Jack's ex-girlfriend. She was a nurse. Unhappy with her and Jack's frugal lifestyle she finds another boyfriend, but finally dumps Jack when he buys a flat she doesn't like with their life savings. Even though she broke up with Jack she is not happy when she sees him with Peggy.

- Shally Tsang as May Yiu (美瑤)

Peggy's late mother. She was also close friends with Joyce. According to House, she was the team manager of his soccer team and after celebrating a game win, the two got drunk and had a one night stand. Also due to her not having any romantic feelings for House that is why she did not allow him to take responsibility for their one night together. She is really Martin's ex-girlfriend. When Joyce and Martin becomes a couple, Joyce pays her off in order for her to no longer have any connection with Martin.

- Sam Tsang as Tsang Mou-wan (曾慕雲)

Yu Sau-hing late older lover. Tsang Siu-keung and Tsang Siu-huen's father. An artist who met Sau-hing when she was his takeout delivery person. After becoming acquainted the two became lovers, but broke up when he found out she was already married to someone else in order to gain entry into Hong Kong. After cooling down his anger he planned on going to see Sau-hing for forgiveness but died of a heart attack the following day.

- Eddie Ho as Tsang Siu-keung (曾少強)

Tsang Mou-wan's adult son by his first marriage. He was not aware that his late father had a flat and a lover. Originally unhappy and unaccepting of Yu Sau-hing and Tsang Siu-huen he reconsiders his feelings for them after reading his late father's journal. Accepting Yu Sau-hing and Tsang Siu-huen as family he also decides not to fight over his late father's flat anymore instead giving full possession to Sau-hing.

- Koo Koon Chung as Anthony Chiang (蔣繼權)

Joyce's business partner and Martin's soccer teammate. He later becomes CEO of his own properties company and competes with All In One to obtain properties. Still single and without a child he hires a surrogate to give birth to a child for him in order to try to get a bigger portion of his father's fortune.

- Raymond Tsang as Mr. Chiang (細蔣生)

Anthony Chiang's younger brother and Tracy's husband. He and his brother do not get along because both are fighting to try to get a bigger portion of their father's fortune.

- Chloe Nguyen as Tracy/Mrs. Chiang (蔣太)

Mr. Chiang's wife. A Hong Kong socialite and Nana's sugar daddy's wife. With the help of Joyce she publicly makes a fool out of Nana who has been flaunting her affair with her husband in the tabloids. Introduced/appears in Ep.09, 17.

- Kelvin Chan as Henry Lei Hin-yeung (利顯揚)

Joyce's younger brother and Cecilia's late fiancee. He died 5 years ago in a car accident. Joyce blames Cecilia for his death because he was speeding in order to make it in time to see Cecilia's piano concert.

- Dolby Kwan as a Calvin

Nana's manager who handles all of her personal affairs. He is homosexual and is interested in Lo Dou-lok, who helped Nana hook up her computer. He later also becomes interested in Au Mei-nam.

- Brian Chu as Tai Gwai-gwong (大舊光)

Lo Dou-lok's university classmate and friend.

- Lily Leung as Elderly lady Chat (七嬸)

Ko Tai-wai's lost mother. She resides at a nursing home and has dementia.

- Kitterick Yiu as Billy

Annie's new fiancee who owns a paid off flat.

- Mok Wai-man as Model shop owner (模型鋪老闆)

Owner of the toy model shop that Jack plans to splurge on his hobby.

- Pang Mei-seung as Elderly lady Giu (嬌婆)

An elderly lady who Jack and House mistaken as a ghost at a building they were renovating due to haunted rumors in the building. She sells tea dumplings at a street alley way. Cecilia is her customer and loves the taste of her dumplings. When she is unable to make her dumplings she teaches the recipe to Jack and Cecilia.

- Billy Cheung as Jack's father (樓耀明爸爸)

Jack's late father who is very good at cooking.

- Iva Law as Cheng Kai-man girlfriend (程啟民之女友)

Cheng Kai-man's current girlfriend, who he is trying to swaddle from. Finding out Kai-man has not paid his rent in months she offers to help him.

== Development ==
- This is Kiki Sheung's last drama with TVB since returning to the station in 2004. Sheung chose not renew her contract with TVB.
- This is Vincent Wong first drama as the male lead.
- The costume fitting ceremony was held on August 5, 2014, at 12:30 pm Tseung Kwan O TVB City Studio One.
- The blessing ceremony took place on September 23, 2014, at 2:00 pm Tseung Kwan O TVB City Studio Thirteen.
- Filming took place from August 3 to August 28, 2015, entirely on location in Hong Kong.
- The drama was originally slated to broadcast after Ghost of Relativity, on TVB Jade channels 9:30-10:30 pm timeslot August 10, 2015. TVB decided to pull Rogue Emperor from the upcoming broadcast schedule, Brick Slaves was then put in Rogue Emperor's scheduled timeslot.

== Viewership ratings ==
#	Timeslot (HKT)	Week	Episode(s)	Average points	Peaking points
1	Mon – Fri; 20:30–21:30	03–07 Aug 2015	1 — 5	25	28
2	Mon – Fri; 20:30–21:30	10–14 Aug 2015	6 — 10	25	--
3	Mon – Fri; 20:30–21:30	17–21 Aug 2015	11 — 15	26	--
4	Mon – Fri; 20:30–21:30	24–28 Aug 2015	16 — 20	26	--
Total average				26	28

== International broadcast ==
Network	Country	Airing Date	Timeslot
Astro On Demand	Malaysia	August 3, 2015	Monday – Friday 8:30 – 9:15 pm
TVBJ	Australia	August 6, 2015	Monday – Friday 7:15 – 8:15 pm
Starhub TV	Singapore	November 2015	Monday – Friday 8:00 – 9:00 pm

== Awards and nominations ==
Year	Ceremony	Category	Nominee	Result
2015	StarHub TVB Awards			
2015	StarHub TVB Awards	My Favourite TVB TV Character	Vincent Wong	Nominated
2015	StarHub TVB Awards	My Favourite TVB TV Character	Selena Lee	Nominated
2015	TVB Star Awards Malaysia	Favourite TVB TV Character	Vincent Wong	Nominated
2015	TVB Star Awards Malaysia	Favourite TVB TV Character	Selena Lee	Nominated
2015	TVB Anniversary Awards	TVB Anniversary Award for Best Drama	Brick Slaves	Nominated
2015	TVB Anniversary Awards	TVB Anniversary Award for Best Actor	Vincent Wong	Nominated
2015	TVB Anniversary Awards	TVB Anniversary Award for Most Popular Male Character	Vincent Wong	Nominated
2015	TVB Anniversary Awards	TVB Anniversary Award for Best Actress	Selena Lee	Nominated
2015	TVB Anniversary Awards	TVB Anniversary Award for Most Popular Female Character	Selena Lee	Nominated
2015	TVB Anniversary Awards	TVB Anniversary Award for Favourite Drama Song	400 Feet (四百呎) by Edwin Siu	Nominated
