= Season of Love (Hong Kong TV series) =

- Genre: Romance
- Starring: Kenneth Ma; Myolie Wu; Kate Tsui; Ron Ng; Nancy Wu; Him Law; Vincent Wong; Toby Leung; Oscar Leung
- Opening theme: Little Something by Mag Lam
- Country of origin: Hong Kong
- Original language: Cantonese
- No. of episodes: 20

Production
- Executive producer: Kwan Wing Chung
- Camera setup: Multi camera
- Running time: 45 minutes
- Production company: TVB

Original release
- Network: Jade; HD Jade
- Release: 11 February – 8 March 2013

Related
- Inbound Troubles; Sergeant Tabloid

Season of Love is a 2013 Hong Kong TVB romance drama that explores the complexity of human love. The drama is a collection of love stories made up of four different segments, with each segment representing one of the four seasons of the year. Him Law and Toby Leung were featured in the Spring segment. The Summer segment featured Kate Tsui and Ron Ng. The Autumn segment featured a complex love triangle portrayed by Nancy Wu, Vincent Wong, and Oscar Leung while the Winter segment featured Kenneth Ma and Myolie Wu.

== Cast ==
=== Spring ===
- Him Law as Season See San, a famous celebrity.
- Toby Leung as Lam Chun Fun, a cargo worker who admires Season.

=== Summer ===
- Kate Tsui as Summer Ha Chi Yan, an aggressive television producer.
- Ron Ng as CK Ng Chun Kai, a photographer.

=== Autumn / Fall ===
- Nancy Wu as Kim Ho Chau Sang, a hairdresser.
- Vincent Wong as Simon Fung Sau Man, a lawyer.
- Oscar Leung as Ray Fong Ka Wai, a hairdresser and Kim's colleague. Also Kim's former husband.

=== Winter ===
- Kenneth Ma as Joe Chu Cho On, a private eye and the only one to appear in all four segments.
- Myolie Wu as Toni Yiu Tong Nei, a historical and cultural docent.

== Viewership ratings ==
Week	Episodes	Date	Average Points	Peaking Points
1	01－04	11–14 February 2013	22	27
2	05－09	18–22 February 2013	25	
3	10－14	25 February – 1 March 2013	25	27
4	15－20	4–8 March 2013	25	27
