= Heart and Greed =

- Poster
- Also known as: Heart of Greed 3
- 溏心風暴3
- Genre: Modern drama
- Written by: Sham Kwok-wing; Leong Man-wah
- Starring: Bosco Wong; Vincent Wong; Louise Lee; Ha Yu; Michelle Yim; Susanna Kwan; Eliza Sam; Priscilla Wong; Sharon Chan; Louis Yuen; Joseph Lee; Michael Tong; Ram Chiang
- Opening theme: 我本無罪 by Susanna Kwan
- Ending theme: 欲言又止 by Vincent Wong & Hana Kuk; I Promise by Linda Chung 不只是朋友 by Alvin Ng; Don't Say Goodbye by Laura Oakes; Will You Remember Me by Adrienne Aiken, Philip Jap & Simon Purton
- Country of origin: Hong Kong
- Original languages: Cantonese; Mandarin
- No. of episodes: 40

Production
- Producer: Lau Ka-ho
- Production locations: Hong Kong; Portugal
- Running time: approx. 43 min
- Production companies: Television Broadcasts Limited; Tencent Penguin Pictures

Original release
- Network: TVB Jade; Tencent Video
- Release: 27 November 2017 – 19 January 2018

Related
- Heart of Greed (2007); Moonlight Resonance (2008)

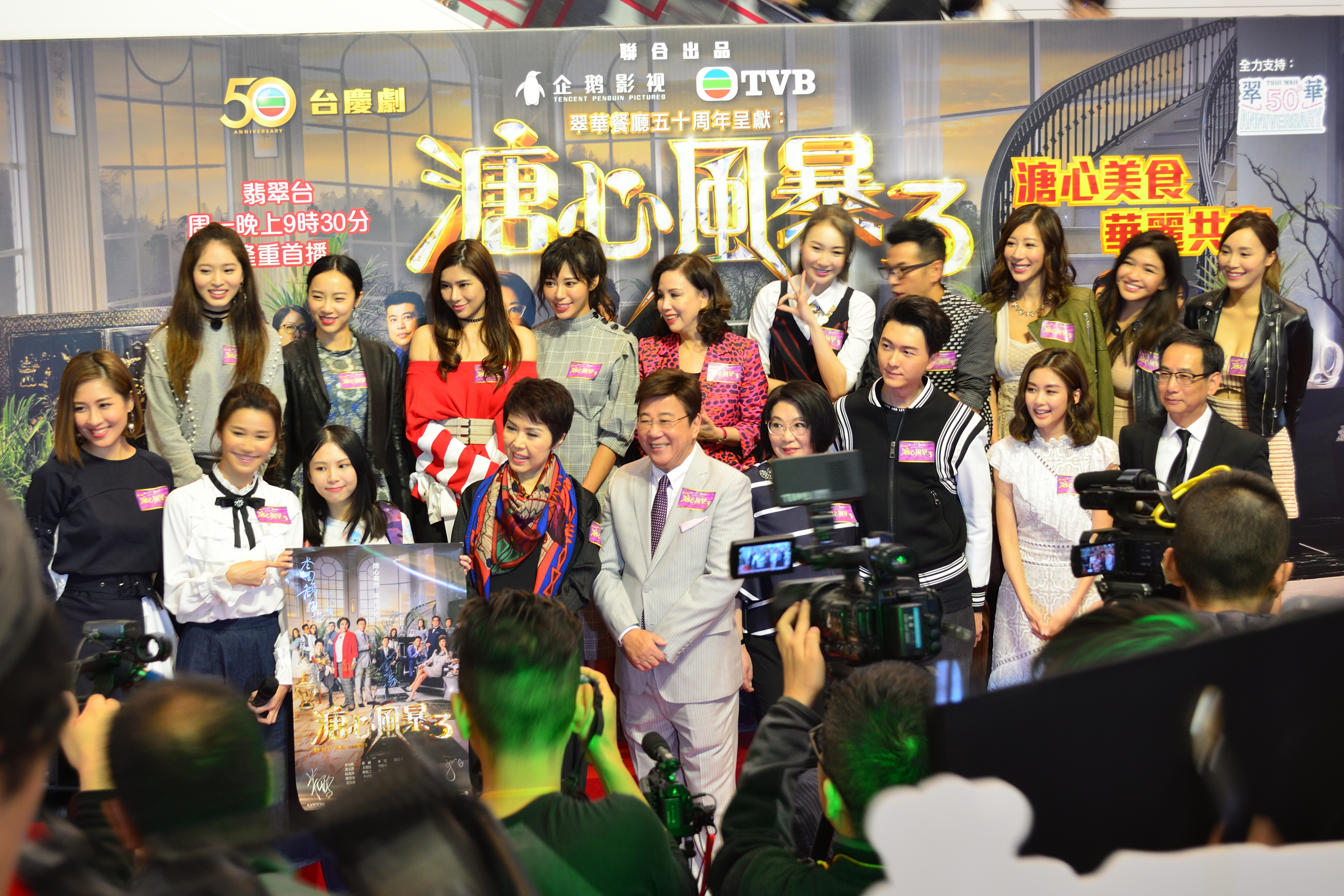
Heart and Greed event

Heart and Greed (Chinese: 溏心風暴3; Cantonese Yale: Tòngsām Fūngbouh3) is a 2017 grand production drama produced by TVB and Tencent Penguin Pictures. It is the third installment of the Heart of Greed series following Moonlight Resonance. It stars Bosco Wong, Louise Lee, Ha Yu, Michelle Yim, Susanna Kwan, Louis Yuen and Joseph Lee from the previous installments, and with new additions Vincent Wong, Eliza Sam, Priscilla Wong, Sharon Chan, Michael Tong and Ram Chiang.

The series was released on Tencent Video from Monday to Friday at 8:00pm, with VIP members able to watch five new episodes one week ahead. It was then broadcast on TVB Jade at 9:30pm.

== Plot ==
Ling Lai Ying (Louise Lee) and her husband, Wong Wing Ching (Ha Yu), are a well-respected and family-oriented couple who worked hard for years expanding their family business, Ka Cheong Wong Limited, which operates a chain of cafes famous for their Hong Kong-style milk tea. In hopes for greater expansion, Wing Ching's sister-in-law, Leung Shun Wah (Susanna Kwan) and her younger brother, Leung Chan (Louis Yuen) attempt to persuade Wing Ching to go public with the company and pursue an IPO (Initial Public Offering). Wing Ching is opposed to the idea, claiming that the family's educational background is limited and going public would be a high risk for the family business.

Meanwhile, Hui Nga Lun (Joseph Lee), an individual who Wing Ching deems as his "benefactor" after Nga Lun served as key witness in defending Wing Ching's innocence in a murder trial, experiences issues in his family's century-old printing business. The printing business was at risk of bankruptcy and Wing Ching is determined to help Nga Lun. Despite Wing Ching's previous concerns, he goes public with the family business and the two family businesses undergo a merger - forming the Hui Wong Group. Initially, members in both families are resistant to the idea. In particular, Yu Sau Wai (Michelle Yim), Nga Lun's wife self-proclaims the Hui family as part of some elite and wealthy class and the Wong family as more grassroots. However, Nga Lun recognizes that the options are scarce and Wing Ching views going public for Nga Lun as a worthwhile risk.

The merger triggers major changes to both businesses. With the changes, arise countless conflicts targeting the actions and decisions of members in both families. During this time, the Wong's only son, Wong Wai Ka (Vincent Wong), reconnects with the Hui's only daughter, Hui Bui Yi (Eliza Sam) whom he had met when they were very young children. The two develop feelings for one another, however when Sau Wai (Bui Yi's mother) suspects the potential for a relationship she openly rejects the idea and the two eventually part ways. Lai Ying was heartbroken for her son and later again for her daughter, Wong Yi Oi (Sharon Chan) who develops feelings for Cheng Lap On (Michael Tong), a married man, father, and highly regarded employee of the Hui Wong Group. Ling Shing Fung (Bosco Wong), Lai Ying's younger brother, is also embroiled in a never-ending obscure relationship with his friend, Fong Hei Man (Priscilla Wong).

The turmoil evolving from the merger spirals into a perpetual and relentless feud involving heartbreak and betrayal - testing the resilience, morale, and integrity of the Wong and Hui family.

== Cast ==
=== Wong/Ling/Leung family ===
Cast	Role	Description
Ha Yu 夏雨	Wong Wing Ching 黃永正	正爸、奶茶黄、奶茶王: Ka Cheong Wong Chairman; Hui Wong Group Vice Chairman and CEO; Husband of Ling Lai Ying; Shum Tsui's ex-lover; Elder Brother of Wong Wing Cheung; Father of Wong Yi Oi and Wong Wai Ka; Fell into a coma in episode 37 and awoke in episode 40
Louise Lee 李司棋	Ling Lai Ying 凌麗熒	火姐、正媽、火百合: Ka Cheong Wong Vice Chairwoman; Hui Wong Group General Manager of Project Planning; Wife of Wong Wing Ching; Mother of Wong Yi Oi and Wong Wai Ka; Elder Sister of Ling Shing Fung
Jimmy Au 歐瑞偉	Wong Wing Cheung 黃永昌	Younger Brother of Wong Wing Ching; Late Husband of Leung Shun Wah; Deceased
Susanna Kwan 關菊英	Leung Shun Wah 梁順華	華姐、找钱華: Ka Cheong Wong Director of Human Resources; Hui Wong Group General Manager of Personnel; Widow of Wong Wing Cheung; Elder Sister of Leung Chan; Sister-in-law of Wong Wing Ching
Louis Yuen 阮兆祥	Leung Chan 梁贊	Like Gor、贊先生、阿贊: Ka Cheong Wong Director of Business Planning; Hui Wong Group Deputy General Manager of Project Planning → CEO, later got demoted due to incompetence; Younger Brother of Leung Shun Wah
Bosco Wong 黃宗澤	Ling Shing Fung 凌乘風	九少、阿九: Ka Cheong Wong Director of Brand Management → Deputy CEO → CEO → Voted out of position; Hui Wong Group General Manager of Corporate Communications; Husband of Fong Hei Man; Younger Brother of Ling Lai Ying; Uncle of Wong Yi Oi and Wong Wai Ka
Priscilla Wong 黃翠如	Fong Hei Man 方希雯	阿爽、Sonia: Wife of Ling Shing Fung; Executive Assistant
Sharon Chan 陳敏之	Wong Yi Oi 黃以愛	Venus、黑面神: Ka Cheong Wong Director of Sales → Photo studio owner; Hui Wong Group General Manager of Sales; Daughter of Ling Lai Ying and Wong Wing Ching; Niece of Ling Shing Fung; Cheng Lap On's ex-lover
Vincent Wong 王浩信	Wong Wai Ka 黃圍家	Kyle: Ka Cheong Wong Deputy Director of Brand Management → Deputy CEO → Chairman; Hui Wong Group Deputy General Manager of Corporate Communications → Executive Assistant; Son of Ling Lai Ying and Wong Wing Ching; Nephew of Ling Shing Fung; Hui Bui Yi's boyfriend

=== Hui/Yu family ===
Cast	Role	Description
Lily Leung 梁舜燕	Hui-Po Wan Kam 許寶韻琴	Mother of Hui Nga Lun and Hui Nga Tun; Grandmother of Hui Bui Yi
Chow Chung	Yu Hok Tak 余學德	Father of Yu Sau Wai; Grandfather of Hui Bui Yi
Joseph Lee	Hui Nga Lun 許雅麟	Alan、許大少、恩公: Hui Cheuk Hang Industry Chairman → Hui Cheuk Hang Group Chairman; Hui Wong Group Chairman; Husband of Yu Sau Wai; Father of Hui Bui Yi; Business partner of Wong Wing Ching
Michelle Yim 米雪	Yu Sau Wai 余秀慧	Amelia、阿咩唻呀: Amelia School director/Hui Cheuk Hang Industry education foundation chairwoman; Wife of Hui Nga Lun; Mother of Hui Bui Yi; Initially disapproves of the Wong family
Lee Shing-cheong	Hui Nga Tun 許雅頓	Adam、許二少: Hui Cheuk Hang Industry CEO → Hui Cheuk Hang Group CEO; Hui Wong Group CFO; Husband of Nga Lei Shan; Sentenced to jail for 2 years and 8 months in episode 40; Returned to England in episode 40
Jacqueline Ch'ng 莊思敏	Nga Lei Shan 雅莉珊	Alice: Hui Cheuk Hang Group Secretary; Wife of Hui Nga Tun; Returned to England in episode 40
Eliza Sam 岑麗香	Hui Bui Yi 許貝兒	Belle: Hui Cheuk Hang Group General Manager of Project Development; Hui Wong Group General Manager of Project Development; Daughter of Hui Nga Lun and Yu Sau Wai; Widow of Yeung Man Tsun; Wong Wai Ka's girlfriend

=== Cheng family ===
Cast	Role	Description
Michael Tong 唐文龍	Cheng Lap On 鄭立安	阿 Nic: Hui Wong Group CEO (Replaced Leung Chan), later resigned after his affair with Wong Yi Oi was exposed; Husband of Daphne, later divorced; Wong Yi Oi's ex-lover
Bianca Wu 胡琳	Daphne	Wife of Cheng Lap On, later divorced

=== Yeung family ===
Cast	Role	Description
Mary Hon	Yeung-Fung Mei Mei 楊馮美美	Mother of Yeung Man Tsun
Jason Chan 陳智燊	Yeung Man Tsun 楊文雋	Brian: Wong Wai Ka's love rival; Husband of Hui Bui Yi; Died in episode 35 in a car accident

=== Other cast ===
Cast	Role	Description
Ram Chiang 蔣志光	Chan Tsz Ming 陳志明	Donald: Lawyer; Two percent shareholder of Hui Wong Group
Carlo Ng 吳家樂	Lo Shun Ho 盧迅浩	Signal Lo: Hui Cheuk Hang Group Deputy CFO; Hui Wong Group Deputy CFO
Maria Cordero	Fung Ching 馮青	Man Lei Restaurant Owner
Luk Ho Ming	Hung Sing 洪成	Man Lei Restaurant co-owner; Son of Fung Ching
Steven Ma	Lei Ming Kei 李明基	阿 Lee: Deceased boyfriend of Fong Hei Man; Friend of Ling Shing Fung
Yumiko Cheng	Crystal	Goddaughter of Ling Lai Ying's old friend; Business associate of Hui Wong Group; One of Ling Shing Fung's love interest
Nora Miao 苗可秀	Shum Tsui 沈沝	水水: Wong Wing Ching's ex-lover; Ling Lai Ying's rival
Chui Chung-San 徐忠信	Lord Kiu 喬爺	Malaysia triad leader; Ling Shing Fung's abductor
Ben Wong 黃智賢	Yau Kei 友基	阿基: Wong Yi Oi's boyfriend
Law Lok-lam	Pang Siu Hung 彭兆雄	Businessman; Ex-husband of Heung Ching Yi
Liza Wang 汪明荃	Heung Ching Yi 向清沂	Ex-wife of Pang Siu Hung; Ling Shing Fung's business partner
Max Cheung 張達倫	Kenny Chung	Lawyer
Jonathan Cheung	Ching Chi Mei 程至美	Doctor

== Development ==
It was announced that original cast members Moses Chan, Raymond Lam, Fala Chen, Linda Chung, and Tavia Yeung will not participate in the drama as Moses Chan, Linda Chung, and Tavia Yeung withdrew due to schedule conflicts with other TVB Dramas being produced while Raymond Lam and Fala Chen ended their contracts with TVB.

- The role of "Wong Wai Ka" was originally intended to be played by Moses Chan, but he had to withdraw from the role due to scheduling conflicts with another 50th anniversary drama, "My Ages Apart" Vincent Wong took his place.
- The roles of "Hui Bui Yi" and "Fong Hei Man" were originally intended to be played by Linda Chung and Tavia Yeung respectively. However, due to scheduling conflicts with their filming of "Another Era" both actresses withdrew from the series, and Eliza Sam and Priscilla Wong took their place.

Filming began on 21 March 2017, and ended on 10 July 2017.

== Release and reception ==
The series was released as a grand production in November 2017. Audiences were less excited when a third sequel was announced without majority of the original cast but there was still anticipation since its predecessors were released a decade prior. However, the series was met with mixed reviews and viewership ratings averaged 24 points. Audiences criticized the overall plot with many saying that it is simply a recycled plot and that times have changed from a decade ago; the similar storylines being used were seen as too primitive. Similar to the first two series, there was a parody segment but due to changing times compared to when the first two series aired, it was met with major backlash from Malaysian Chinese as it was seen as racially insensitive and a mockery of their culture and clothing with many Malaysians threatening to boycott future TVB series.

== Music ==
Title	Type	Composer	Lyrics	Arranger	Producer(s)	Performer(s)
我本無罪	Opening theme	Alan Cheung	Sandy Chang	Johnny Yim	Johnny Yim; Herman Ho	Susanna Kwan
欲言又止	Ending theme	Alan Cheung	Sandy Chang	Alan Cheung	Herman Ho; Joseph Wei	Vincent Wong; Hana Kuk
I Promise	Interlude	鄺靜欣	Wayne James	Dominic Chu	Herman Ho; Joseph Wei	Linda Chung
不只是朋友	Interlude	Alan Cheung	Sandy Chang	Johnny Yim	Johnny Yim; Herman Ho	Alvin Ng
Don't Say Goodbye	Interlude	—	—	—	—	Laura Oakes
Will You Remember Me	Interlude	—	—	—	—	Adrienne Aiken; Philip Jap; Simon Purton

== International broadcast ==
Region	Network	Notes
Singapore	VV Drama & MediaCorp Channel 8	Dubbed With Mandarin
Malaysia	8TV	Dubbed in Mandarin

== Viewership ratings ==
#	Timeslot (HKT)	Week	Episode(s)	Average points	Peaking points
1	Mon – Fri 21:30	27 November - 1 December 2017	1 — 5	22	25
2	Mon – Fri 21:30	4 — 8 December 2017	6 — 10	22	24
3	Mon – Fri 21:30	11 — 15 December 2017	11 — 15	21	24
4	Mon – Fri 21:30	18 – 22 December 2017	16 — 20	22	26
5	Mon – Fri 21:30	25 — 29 December 2017	21 — 25	21	23
6	Mon – Fri 21:30	1 — 5 January 2018	26 — 30	24	27
7	Mon – Fri 21:30	8 — 12 January 2018	31 — 35	25	28
8	Mon – Fri 21:30	15 — 19 January 2018	36 — 40	28.5	32
Total average				24	26

== Accolades ==
Year	Award	Category	Recipient(s)	Result
2018	2017 TVB Anniversary Awards	Best Actor	Ha Yu	Nominated
2018	2017 TVB Anniversary Awards	Best Actor	Bosco Wong	Nominated
2018	2017 TVB Anniversary Awards	Best Actress	Susanna Kwan	Nominated
2018	2017 TVB Anniversary Awards	Best Actress	Louise Lee	Nominated
2018	2017 TVB Anniversary Awards	Best Actress	Michelle Yim	Nominated
2018	2017 TVB Anniversary Awards	Best Actress	Eliza Sam	Nominated
2018	2017 TVB Anniversary Awards	Best Supporting Actor	Louis Yuen	Nominated
2018	2017 TVB Anniversary Awards	Best Supporting Actress	Sharon Chan	Nominated (Top 5)
2018	2017 TVB Anniversary Awards	Most Popular Male Character	Bosco Wong	Nominated
2018	2017 TVB Anniversary Awards	Most Popular Female Character	Susanna Kwan	Nominated
2018	2017 TVB Anniversary Awards	Most Popular Female Character	Louise Lee	Nominated
2018	2017 TVB Anniversary Awards	Most Popular Female Character	Michelle Yim	Nominated
2018	2017 TVB Anniversary Awards	Most Popular Female Character	Eliza Sam	Nominated
2018	2017 TVB Anniversary Awards	Best Drama	—N/a	Nominated
