= Hana Kuk =

HK singer and actress

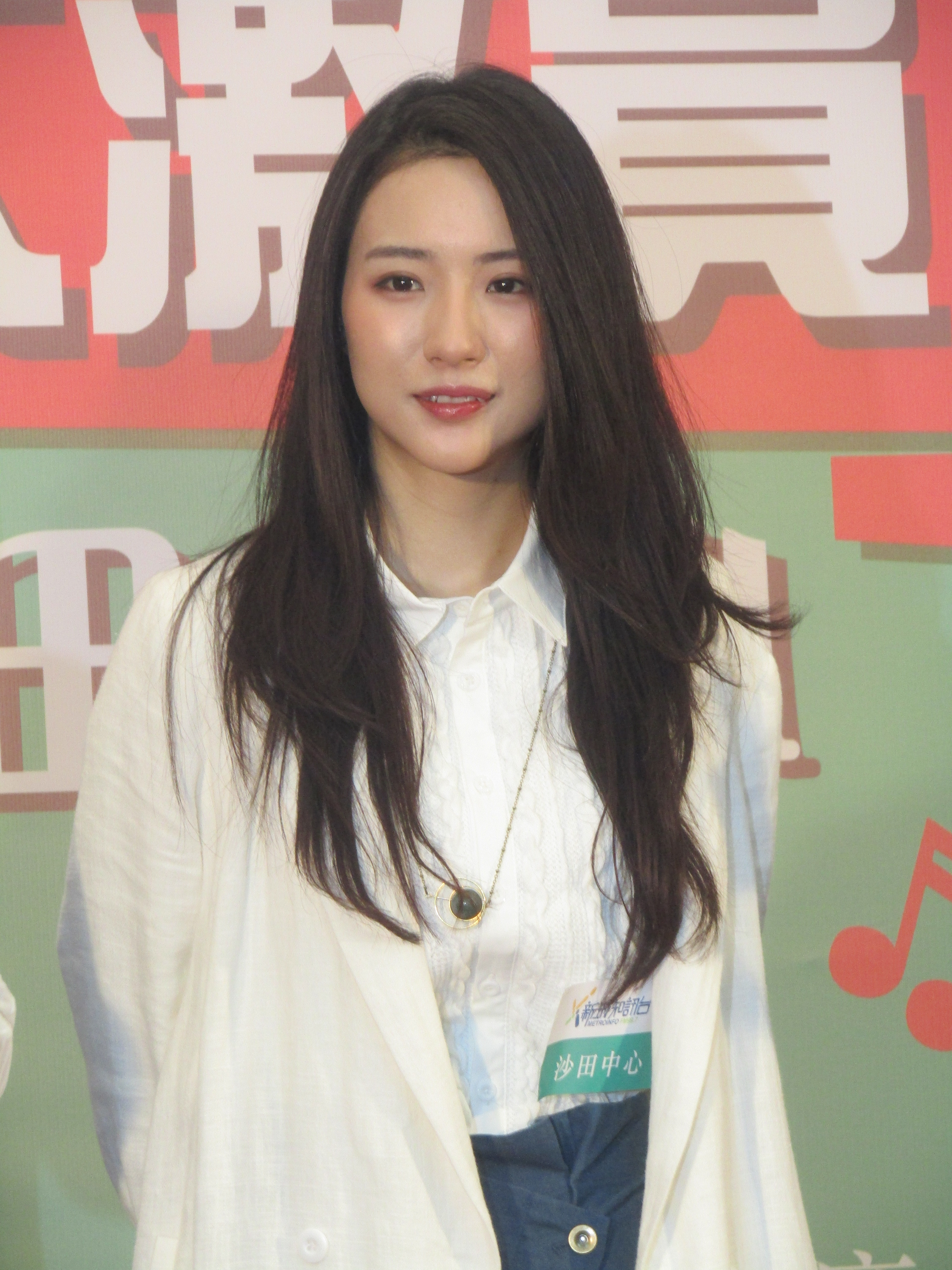
- Hana Kuk in 2016
- Born: Chan Hiu Yi; 17 May 1982 (age 44) or 24 November 1986 (age 39); British Hong Kong
- Education: HKU School of Professional and Continuing Education
- Alma mater: Buddhist Tai Kwong Chi Hong College
- Occupations: Singer; songwriter; actress
- Years active: 3 June 2016; 10 years ago
- Awards: Full list
- Musical career
- Also known as: Haley
- Origin: Hong Kong
- Genres: Cantopop; rock
- Instrument: Guitars
- Labels: PanAsiaCC（2016－）; Voice Entertainment→TVB Music Group（2017－2023）; Stars Music International（2023－）

Chinese name
- Traditional Chinese: 菊梓喬
- Simplified Chinese: 菊梓乔
Transcriptions
Standard Mandarin
- Hanyu Pinyin: Jú Zǐqiáo
Yue: Cantonese
- Jyutping: Guk1 zi2 kiu4

Birth name
- Traditional Chinese: 陳曉怡
- Simplified Chinese: 陈晓怡
Transcriptions
Standard Mandarin
- Hanyu Pinyin: chén xiǎo yí
Yue: Cantonese
- Jyutping: can4 hiu2 ji4

Haley Chan Hiu-yi (simplified Chinese: 陈晓怡; traditional Chinese: 陳曉怡), known professionally as Hana Kuk Tsz-kiu (simplified Chinese: 菊梓乔; traditional Chinese: 菊梓喬; born 17 May 1982 or 24 November 1986), is a Hong Kong singer-songwriter currently managed by PanAsiaCC and Stars Music International, debuted in 2016. Her Chinese stage name was voted by fans.

== Early life ==
Her parents divorced at a young age and she lived with her younger sister. Due to financial and family problems, she dropped out of school at 13 to earn a living, she later returned to her studies at age 20. Prior to returning to school, she took up multiple jobs including being an apprentice at a beauty salon, Photography assistant, and makeup artist.

== Career ==
=== 2008-2016: Career beginning ===
She had been the lead vocal as Haley Xc in Pleasure Garden in 2008. In 2014, she participated Super M as Chan Hiu Yi, Super Star and Hot Door Night.

In 2016, she was debuted as a female singer-songwriter under PanAsiaCC through the recommendation of Addison from ZEN. In July, she released the single "Today's Me" which performed good on the charts. Later, she has released two singles, "Fool in the Fairy Tale" and "Seven Years Old". Because of the commercial success of these singles, she has received Best New Artist awards from several shows.

=== 2017-2020: Forgot Myself, Last Forever, and Can't Let You Go ===
In 2017, she signed a record deal with Voice Entertainment. After that, her first single from Voice Entertainment, "Lifetime Waiting", charted number 1 on Jade Solid Gold for two weeks. "Forgot Myself", the ending theme song from Line Walker: The Prelude hit 100,000 views on the first day of its release. In November, after 2 months of its release, it had over 4 million views online. On 3 November, she has released her debut solo album, Forgot Myself. In 2018, most of her singles has reached 1M views. Back to the Day We Met and Flying Into The Flame are even the 5th and the 7th most popular Cantonese song on YouTube in 2018. On 30 September, "Forgot Myself" has reached over 10M views on YouTube. The video takes one year and 11 days to reach 10 million views. She became the second female artist from Voice Entertainment to have owned a 10M video on YouTube. In December, she released her second solo album, Last Forever.

Her first concert was held in August 2019 in KITEC. In December, she released her third solo album Can't Let You Go.

=== 2021: First Non-Cameo, Non-Extra Role as an Actress ===
Starting in 2018, Hana began making guest appearances in TVB dramas. In 2021, she took on a supporting role in Murder Diary, her first non-cameo, non-extra role.

== Discography ==
=== Studio albums ===
#	Album Info	Track listing
1st	Forgot Myself: Released： 3 November 2017; Labels: Voice Entertainment; Sony Music Hong Kong; PanAsiaCC	CD: 1. 忘記我自己 Forgot Myself; 2. 手中沙 Sands in Hand; 3. 一輩子守候 Lifetime Waiting; 4. 七歲 Seven Years Old; 5. 欲言又止 Lost For Words (ft. Vincent Wong); 6. 傻瓜裡的童話 Fool in the Fairy Tale; 7. 久別重逢 Reunion; 8. 今天的我 Today's Me; 9. 下雨 Raining (Mandarin of Fool in the Fairy Tale)
2nd	Last Forever: Released： December 20, 2018; Labels: Voice Entertainment; Sony Music Hong Kong; PanAsiaCC	CD: 1. 只想與你再一起 Love You Again; 2. 但願人長久 Last Forever; 3. 從未說起 Never Said; 4. 飛蛾撲火 Flying Into The Flame; 5. 回到以前 Back To The Day We Met; 6. 別再怕 Don't Be Afraid; 7. 聽雪落涙 The Tears of Snow; 8. 為難自己 Be Hard on Yourself; 9. 相信愛情 Believe In Love
3rd	Can't Let You Go: Released： December 9, 2020; Labels: Voice Entertainment; Sony Music Hong Kong; PanAsiaCC	CD: 1. 不能放手 Can't Let You Go; 2. 低谷天堂 Feels Like Heaven (ft. Raymond Lam); 3. 鋼鐵有淚 I Finally Cried; 4. 我輸不起 I Don't Want to Lose; 5. 没完没了 Never Ending; 6. 心有不甘 Unwilling; 7. 沒有你開始 Without You; 8. 我不是她 The Second Choice; 9. 你喜歡說謊 Liar; 10. 說過放下 Letting Go; 11. 逆光飛翔 Be Brave

=== Singles ===
Year	Single	Peak positions									Album
Year	Single	RTHK Chinese Pop Chart	CRHK Ultimate 903	Metro Radio Pop Chart 997	JSG Billboard (TVB)	DBC Chart	Global Chinese Pop Chart	hmv PLAY	Canadian Hits	TVB8	Album
2016	"Today's Me"	12	6	6	8	3	-	-	-	-	Forgot Myself
2016	"Fool in the Fairy Tale"	17	7	5	1	2	-	-	-	-	Forgot Myself
2016	"Seven Years Old"	-	11	3	3	-	-	-	-	-	Forgot Myself
2017	"Lifetime Waiting"	-	1	1	(1)	-	-	-	-	-	Forgot Myself
2017	"Sands in Hand"	-	1	3	1	-	2	5	-	-	Forgot Myself
2017	"Reunion"	×	×	×	1	-	-	-	-	-	Forgot Myself
2017	"Forgot Myself"	-	3	3	(1)	-	-	2	6	-	Forgot Myself
2017	"Raining"	×	×	×	-	-	-	-	-	(1)	Forgot Myself
2017	"Lost for Words"	-	1	17	1	-	-	1	10	-	Forgot Myself
2018	"Back To The Day We Met"	-	3	3	1	-	12	-	1	-	Last Forever
2018	"The Tears of Snow"	-	-	-	2	-	-	-	-	-	Last Forever
2018	"Flying Into The Flame"	-	3	-	1	-	-	-	-	-	Last Forever
2018	"Love You Again"	-	18	18	4	-	-	-	-	-	Last Forever
2018	"Never Said"	x	x	x	-	-	-	-	-	-	Last Forever
2018	"Last Forever"	3	-	3	1	-	-	-	-	-	Last Forever
2018	"Don't Be Afraid"	-	-	-	1	-	-	-	-	-	Last Forever
2019	"Unwilling"	x	x	x	1	-	-	-	-	-	Can't Let You Go
2019	"I Finally Cried"	-	3	1	1	-	-	-	-	-	Can't Let You Go
2019	"You Are My World"	x	x	x	1	-	-	-	-	-	—N/a
2019	"Without You"	-	3	4	1	-	-	-	-	-	Can't Let You Go
2019	"Be Brave"	-	3	1	1	-	-	-	-	-	Can't Let You Go
2020	"Liar"	-	2	1	1	-	-	-	-	-	Can't Let You Go
2020	"The Second Choice"	-	-	-	1	-	-	-	-	-	Can't Let You Go
2020	"If You Understand"	-	-	2	1	-	-	-	-	-	—N/a
2020	"I Can't Forget About You"	-	10	12	4	-	-	-	-	-	—N/a
2020	"I Don't Want to Lose"	-	-	2	1	-	-	-	-	-	Can't Let You Go
2020	"Letting Go"	-	-	-	1	-	-	-	-	-	Can't Let You Go
2020	"Can't Let You Go"	-	1*	2	1	-	-	-	3	-	Can't Let You Go
2020	"Feels Like Heaven"	-	-	-	2	-	-	-	-	-	Can't Let You Go
2021	"Never Ending"	-	3	3	4	-	-	-	-	-	Can't Let You Go
"—" denotes releases that did not chart. "×" denotes releases were not sent to those music stations

Total No.1 Hits
903	RTHK	997	TVB	Note
0	4	5	22	The Total Number of Four No.1 Hit songs：0

=== Soundtrack appearance ===
Title	Year	Film/TV Drama	Note
"Lifetime Waiting"	2017	The Princess Weiyoung	Theme Song
"Sands in Hand"	2017	My Unfair Lady	Ending Theme Song
"Reunion"	2017	Eternal Love	Theme Song
"Forgot Myself"	2017	Line Walker: The Prelude	Ending Theme Song
"Lost for Words"	2017	Heart and Greed	Ending Theme Song
"Back To The Day We Met"	2018	Stealing Seconds	Ending Theme Song
"The Tears of Snow"	2018	The Flame's Daughter	Theme Song
"Flying Into The Flame"	2018	Deep in the Realm of Conscience	Ending Theme Song
"Love You Again"	2018	Another Era	Ending Theme Song
"Never Said"	2018	Life on the Line	Ending Theme Song
"Last Forever"	2018	Life on the Line	Interlude
"Don't Be Afraid"	2018	Fist Fight	Ending Theme Song
"Unwilling"	2019	The Legend of Haolan	Theme Song
"I Finally Cried"	2019	The Defected	Ending Theme Song
"You Are My World"	2019	Heavenly Sword and Dragon Slaying Saber	Ending Theme Song
"Without You"	2019	Big White Duel	Ending Theme Song
"Be Brave"	2019	Legend of the Phoenix	Theme Song
"Liar"	2020	Of Greed and Ants	Ending Theme Song
"The Second Choice"	2020	Forensic Heroes IV	Ending Theme Song
"If You Understand"	2020	Airport Strikers	Ending Theme Song
"I Can't Forget About You"	2020	The Exorcist's 2nd Meter	Ending Theme Song
"I Don't Want to Lose"	2020	Life After Death	Ending Theme Song
"Letting Go"	2020	The Song of Glory	Theme Song
"Can't Let You Go"	2020	Line Walker: Bull Fight	Ending Theme Song
"Feels Like Heaven"	2020	Line Walker: Bull Fight	Interlude
"Love is Beautiful"	2021	Beauty And The Boss	Theme Song
"Secret Garden"	2021	Sinister Beings	Ending Theme Song
"Trust Nobody"	2021	Murder Diary	Ending Theme Song
"Butterfly Effect"	2021	Murder Diary	Interlude

== Filmography ==
=== Television dramas (TVB) ===
Year	Title	Role	Notes
2018	Wife Interrupted	Pinwheel Girl	Guest Appearance in Ep. 6
2019	The Man Who Kills Trouble	Jane	Guest Appearance in Ep. 5, 7
2020	Go! Go! Go! Operation C9	Gym Customer	Guest Appearance in Ep. 15
2021	Murder Diary	Hoi Nam	Supporting Role (Introduced in Ep. 14)

== Writing Credits ==
#	Song	Year	Artist	Album	Contribution		Note
#	Song	Year	Artist	Album	Lyrics	Melody	Note
1	"Seven Years Old"	2016	Herself	Forgot Myself	No	Yes	(Note: It was originally written in 2010, but recorded in 2015 where the lyrics was rewritten by Oscar)
2	"Fool In The Fairytale"	2016	Herself	Forgot Myself	No	Yes	(Note: Cantonese version of Raining)
3	"Raining (Mandarin)"	2017	Herself	Forgot Myself	Yes	Yes	(Note: It was originally written during 2014 and 2015)
4	"Back To The Past"	2018	Herself	Last Forever	(Note: Lyrics was co-written with Sandy Chang and Tse)	Yes	
5	"Never Ending"	2020	Herself	Can't Let You Go	No	(Note: Melody was co-written with Zhou Aoting)	
6	"Secret Garden"	2021	Herself	No	No	(Note: Melody was co-written with Ah Lee)	
