= Gun Metal Grey =

Hong Kong television series

- Official poster
- 刑警
- Genre: Drama; Police procedural
- Written by: Lau Choi-wan; Leung Yan-tung
- Starring: Michael Miu; Felix Wong; Jessica Hsuan; Nancy Wu; Vincent Wong
- Opening theme: Fui Sik Hung So (灰色控訴) performed by Super 4
- Ending theme: Ngor Tik Lei Hoi Ya Si Oi (我的離開也是愛) performed by Alfred Hui
- Composer: Yip Siu-chung
- Country of origin: Hong Kong
- Original language: Cantonese
- No. of episodes: 30 (list of episodes)

Production
- Producer: Terry Tong
- Production location: Hong Kong
- Camera setup: Multi camera
- Running time: 45 mins.
- Production company: TVB

Original release
- Network: TVB Jade
- Release: 1 November – 10 December 2010

Gun Metal Grey
- Title screen shot
- Chinese: 刑警
- Literal meaning: "Criminal Police"
Transcriptions
Standard Mandarin
- Hanyu Pinyin: Xing Jǐng
Yue: Cantonese
- Jyutping: Ying1 Ging2

Gun Metal Grey is a 2010 Hong Kong police procedural television drama produced by Television Broadcasts Limited (TVB). It originally aired on Jade from 1 November to 10 December 2010, consisting of 30 episodes. Gun Metal Grey is a dramatisation and fictional telling of Hong Kong's top ten criminal cases, which tells about the complexities of human nature and the strangeness of truth.

Gun Metal Grey is written by Lau Choi-wan and Leung Yan-tung, with Terry Tong serving as the executive producer. The drama is one of two grand TVB productions to celebrate the channel's 43rd anniversary, the other being No Regrets, both were the first to be broadcast live in English subtitles.

The Chinese title of Gun Metal Grey literally means "criminal police", which can also be used to a describe a cop who commits a crime. During early promotions for the drama, the year "2010" was attached to the Chinese title to prevent confusion with previous dramas of a similar title. The English title is a wordplay on the colour of guns, a representation of criminal justice, and Felix Wong's character Stone Sir, a cop who finds himself trapped in a grey area of morality.

== Plot ==
Stone was framed in a killing of a happy family, and convicted in jail for 15 years, before he saw a newspaper article which allowed him to overturn the case. His lawyer helped him and he was able to get acquitted. When Stone knew he was being framed 15 years ago, he intended to find the real murderer.

He eventually returned to the police force and was sent to Mad Sir's team (played by Michael Miu), a good brother of his during his time as a cop. He investigates further and discovered the real murderer. He then decided to get to the bottom of the case and wanted to bring the murderer to justice. However, due to lack of evidence, the murderer who framed him was not able to be convicted. This led to Stone using his own method (killing) in resolving the situation.

From then, Stone found that whenever the law failed to carry out justice, he will use his own method to do so. He took the lost revolver gun which the murderer dropped and used it to "carry out justice" - in Stone's perceptive. His actions as an underground judge became more and more dangerous and when Mad Sir found out, he warned Stone to put away his dangerous thoughts and actions. Stone Sir did not heed his warning at all and continued to use his own method to carry out justice.

During one night, Carson (played by Vincent Wong) and the rest of Mad Sir's team was carrying out an operation and Stone was there too. During the operation, Carson told Stone to surrender and turn back. However, Stone resisted and felt he did nothing wrong. They then struggle and Stone's revolver was accidentally fired and shot Carson, Mad Sir wanted to arrest Stone but does not have sufficient evidence, at that time Stone found out that he got filmed by a person called Ah Long.

Stone try every means to find Ah Long but Ah Long pass the memory card to Kim (played by Jessica Hsuan), a reporter. Ah Long was subsequently killed by Stone and the content in the memory card was seen by Kim. Stone kidnap Kim as he wanted the card back, Mad Sir and his team came and asked Stone to surrender but in the end Stone got shot by Mad Sir, Mad Sir asked him for Kim location but Stone did not tell and said there is bomb and it will exploded soon, just as Kim was about to talk the bomb exploded...

== Cast and characters ==
- Michael Miu as Mad Sir / SIP. Mai On-ting (米安定): Mad is Team A's Senior Inspector and Stone's on and off good friend. After Miu was cast as Mad Sir, he and his wife Jaime Chik immediately suggested to the producers that Wong should be cast for the role of Stone Sir, in which Wong accepted after reading the script. Both Miu and Wong were members of the Five Tigers, a performance group which consisted of five young male idols who dominated the television screen during the 1980s. Miu and Wong's last collaboration was the 1985 action/fantasy mini drama, The Yang's Saga.
- Felix Wong as Stone Sir / SGT. Shek Tung-sing (石東昇): Stone is a CID sergeant who was sentenced to a lifelong jail term for a murder he did not commit. Fifteen years later, he finds evidence that can prove his innocence after reading a news article written by Kim. After he is released from jail, he returns to work as a CID sergeant in the Serious Crime Unit, under Mad Sir's A Team. Stone is described to be a vengeful and insecure cope' in a sense and [his] thoughts start to become more and more extreme."
- Jessica Hsuan as Kim Hui (許文謙): Kim is an avid news reporter who constantly finds herself in the midst of trouble and accidents when seeking interviews. Fortunately for Kim, both Stone and Mad always come to her aid. Kim's primary role in Gun Metal Grey is to be the love interest for both Stone and Mad: Kim develops a strong crush on Stone, but ultimately becomes Mad's girlfriend. Hsuan describes Kim to be "a character that I regularly portray—strong on the outside, soft on the inside—a woman who has a very serious outlook when it comes to love."
- Nancy Wu as SGT. Sze Hui (許文詩): Kim's younger adopted sister, who is a CID sergeant under Mad's crew.
- Vincent Wong as PI. Carson Ko (高紀煬), a probationary inspector under Mad's crew who falls in love with Sze.
- Grace Wong as Leng Bao / PC. Kong Hoi-ching (江愷澄), Mad's subordinate.
- Oscar Leung as Fai Shim / PC. Lee Shim-leung (李閃亮), Mad's subordinate.
- Koo Ming-wah as PC. Lo Hang (魯亨), Mad's subordinate.
- Rebecca Chan as Kan Chuk-kwan (簡竹君), Stone's ex-wife.
- Mimi Chu as Lily Ma (馬莉莉), Kim and Sze's foster mother.
- Lee Kwok Lun as Ho Kai-chit (賀佳喆), Kwan's boyfriend.
- Janice Ting as Sharon Shek (石朗), Stone and Kwan's daughter.
- Yue Chi-ming as Shek Ka-chai (石家齊), Stone's father.
- Lily Li as Wong Mei-ha (王美霞), Stone's mother.
- Vincent Wan as Ben Yue (余大斌), a photographer.
- Cilla Kung as Daisy So (蘇小琦), a reporter.

== Production ==
=== Filming ===
Outdoor filming commenced in late September 2009, and studio filming began in mid-October. The sales presentation trailer, which consisted of scenes that were independent from the actual production, were filmed in Tuen Mun from 4 to 6 October 2009. Kenny Wong and Stephen Huynh portrayed a villain and a victim respectively in the trailer, but Wong was later announced to not take part in the actual production of the drama.

== Release ==
=== Marketing ===
The presentation trailer of Gun Metal Grey premiered on the TVB Jade channel on 5 December 2009 during the showing of TVB Sales Presentation 2010. It was the first of twelve 2010 drama productions that were introduced. Although initial reception of the trailer was not as popularly received as the channel's other anniversary drama, No Regrets, many viewers expressed that Gun Metal Grey would be a success once it airs due to it being a "Five Tiger collaboration."

On 23 March 2010, TVB introduced Gun Metal Grey as one of the channel's four upcoming big productions at the annual Hong Kong FILMART, an international media exhibit of Hong Kong's TV and film productions. At the time, the drama was promoted as "刑警2010", with the year referencing to the year of broadcast in order to distinguish the drama from previous productions of a similar title. Two teaser trailers were released through TVB Jade on 13 October 2010, with each trailer introducing the characters of Sing and Mad Sir. A music video of the drama's ending theme, Ngor Tik Lei Hoi Ya Si Oi (lit. "My Departure is also Love"), sung by Alfred Hui, also premiered on the channel that same day. A third trailer was released on 20 October.

== Award and nominations ==
=== 2010 TVB Anniversary Awards ===
- Nominated: Best Drama
- Nominated: Best Actor (Felix Wong) Top 5
- Nominated: Best Actor (Michael Miu)
- Nominated: Best Supporting Actor (Vincent Wong)
- Nominated: Best Supporting Actress (Nancy Wu) Top 5

=== My Astro On Demand Favourites Awards 2011 ===
- Won: My Favourite Potential Actor (Vincent Wong)
- Won: My Favourite Potential Actress (Nancy Wu)
- Nominated: My Favourite Drama
- Nominated: My Favourite Supporting Actress (Nancy Wu) - Top 5
- Nominated: My Favourite On-screen Couple (Vincent Wong & Nancy Wu) - Top 5

== Viewership ratings ==
	Week	Episodes	Average Points	Peaking Points	References
1	November 1–5, 2010	1 — 5	30	—	
2	November 8–12, 2010	6 — 10	30	32	
3	November 15–18, 2010	11 — 14	31	—	
4	November 22–26, 2010	15 — 19	30	—	
5	November 29 - December 3, 2010	20 — 24	29	—	
6	December 6–9, 2010	25 — 28	30	34	
7	December 10, 2010	29	31	36	
