= Vincent Wan (actor, born 1984) =

Hong Kong actor

Vincent Wan Ka Hung
- Born: Vincent Wan; Reading, Berkshire, England
- Occupations: Actor, singer
Vincent Wan
- Traditional Chinese: 溫家恆
- Simplified Chinese: 溫家恆
Transcriptions
Standard Mandarin
- Hanyu Pinyin: Wen Jia Heng

Vincent Wan Ka Hung is a Hong Kong actor under Television Broadcast Limited. He is also working under TVB Jade when he starred in Relic of an Emissary. He has starred in a few films such as Moonlight Resonance. He has starred in other films such as Relic of an Emissary portraying Chu Chun, Prince Su (朱椿) and Gun Metal Grey as Photographer Ben Yue.

== Education ==
Vincent graduated from the University College of London in England. He can speak a range of languages such as Mandarin, Cantonese and English. Seeing his type in English, he has a range of favorite actors such as Ewan McGregor, Johnny Depp, Matt Damon, Shia LaBeouf.

== Filmography ==
Title	Year	Role	Notes
2011	Relic of an Emissary	Chu Chun, Prince Su	
2010	Gun Metal Grey	Photographer Ben Yue	
2008	Moonlight Resonance	Gan Wing Chung	
