= Vincent Wong (Hong Kong actor) =

- 王浩信
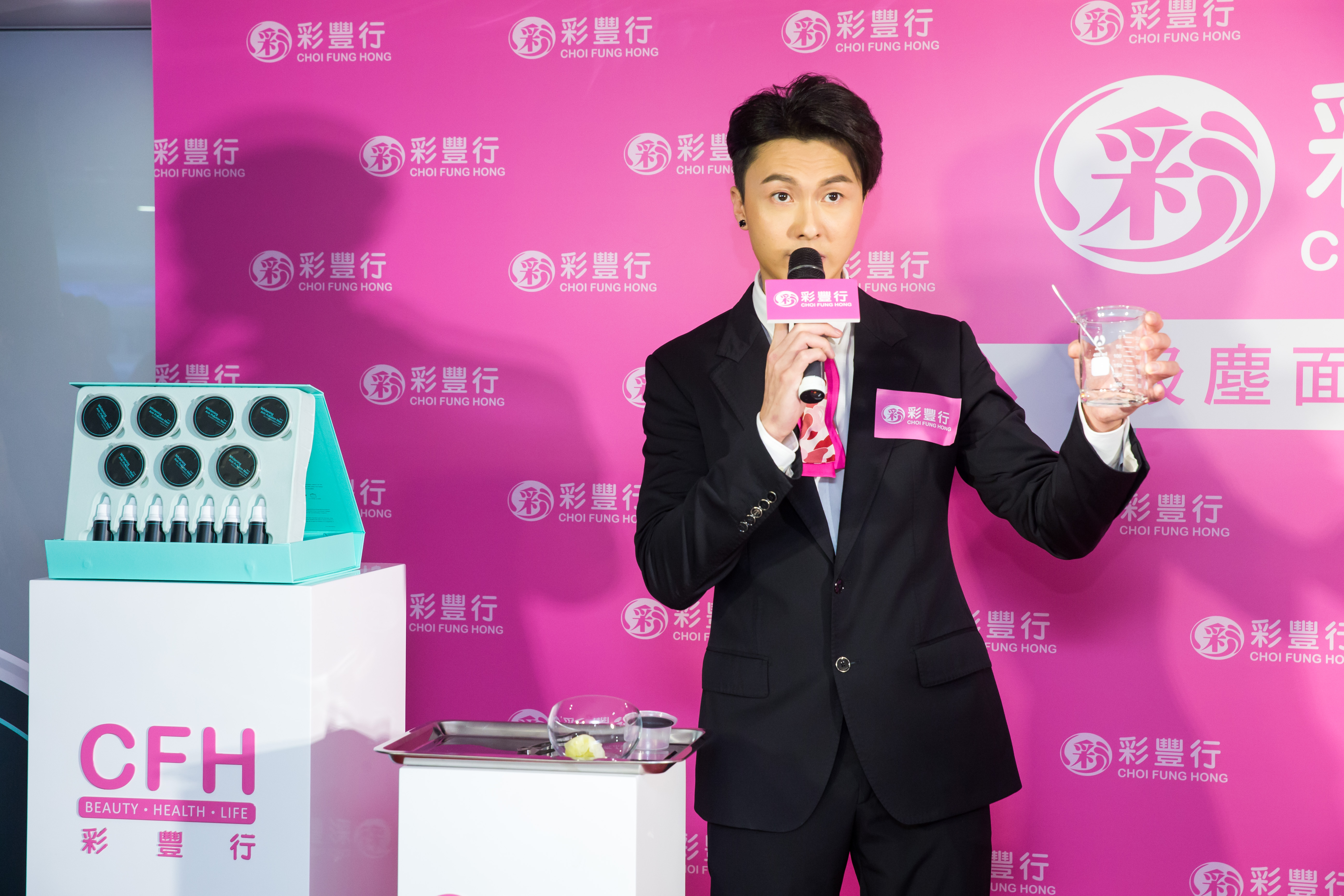
- Wong in 2018
- Born: Wong Ho (Chinese: 王昊; pinyin: Wáng Hào; Jyutping: Wong4 Hou6); 7 July 1983 (age 43); Xinjiang or Shenzhen, China (disputed)
- Occupations: Actor; singer
- Years active: 2005–present
- Notable work: Over Run Over; My Unfair Lady; Legal Mavericks series Al Cappuccino
- Height: 186 cm (6 ft 1 in)
- Awards: TVB Anniversary Awards – Most Improved Male Artiste; 2013 Friendly Fire, Season of Love, Sergeant Tabloid, A Change of Heart, Will Power; Most Popular Onscreen Partnership; 2016 Over Run Over; 2020 Al Cappuccino; Best Actor; 2017 Legal Mavericks; 2020 Legal Mavericks 2020; Favourite TVB Actor in Malaysia; 2020 Legal Mavericks 2020 StarHub TVB Awards – My Favourite TVB Supporting Actor; 2015 Tomorrow is Another Day; My Favourite TVB Actor; 2017 Legal Mavericks My AOD Favourites Awards – My Favourite Most Promising Male Artiste; 2011 Gun Metal Grey
- Musical career
- Also known as: Signal Wong
- Labels: TVB, Shaw Brothers Studio

Chinese name
- Chinese: 王浩信
Transcriptions
Standard Mandarin
- Hanyu Pinyin: Wáng Hàoxìn
Yue: Cantonese
- Jyutping: Wong4 Hou6 Seon3

Vincent Wong Ho Shun (Chinese: 王浩信; born 7 July 1983) is a Hong Kong actor and singer currently contracted to TVB and Shaw Brothers Studio.

Wong had won the TVB Anniversary Award for Best Actor with his role in the Legal Mavericks series in 2017 and 2020 respectively.

== Early life and career ==
Wong was born in Xinjiang or Shenzhen. His father is a Han Chinese from Xinjiang, while his mother is a Uyghur or Teochow (disputed). He moved to Hong Kong when he was a child. Wong studied graphic design at the Hong Kong Art School, and worked as a designer before he was scouted by a talent agent in 2004. Wong attended The Colorado Springs School in the United States. In 2005, Wong debuted as a singer under the record label Neway Star with his first single "訊號 (Signal)" and released an album with Neway.

In 2008, Wong joined TVB and made his acting debut in the drama Wars of In-Laws II. With his role in the 2010 drama Gun Metal Grey, he earned his first Best Supporting Actor nomination at the 2010 TVB Anniversary Awards and won My Favourite Most Promising Male Artiste award at the 2011 My AOD Favourites Award. Wong won the Most Improved Male Artiste award at the 2013 TVB Anniversary Awards.

With his role in the 2014 drama Tomorrow Is Another Day, Wong earned his first nomination for the Most Popular Male Character at the 2014 TVB Anniversary Awards and won My Favourite TVB Supporting Actor award at the 2015 StarHub TVB Award. In 2015, Wong took on his first male leading role in the drama Brick Slaves, garnering his first Best Actor nomination at the 2015 TVB Anniversary Awards.

Wong gained recognition with his role as "Ditch" in the 2016 drama Over Run Over. His onscreen partnership with Tracy Chu was well received, for which he won the Most Popular Onscreen Partnership award with Chu at the 2016 TVB Anniversary Awards. Furthermore, he was placed in the top five nominations for Best Actor and Most Popular Male Character.

With his role as the blind barrister "Hope Man" in the 2017 critically acclaimed drama Legal Mavericks, Wong won My Favourite TVB Actor award at the StarHub TVB Awards and the Best Actor award at the TVB Anniversary Awards. With the same role in the sequel Legal Mavericks 2020, he won TVB Anniversary Award for Best Actor award again as well as the Favourite TVB Actor in Malaysia award. Also, together with Owen Cheung and Brian Chu, Wong won the Most Popular Onscreen Partnership award with the 2020 comedy drama Al Cappuccino.

In 2021, Wong starred opposite veterans Kara Wai and Philip Keung in the crime thriller Murder Diary, portraying a dissociative identity disorder character – the police undercover agent "Ip King-fung", the graphologist and criminal profiler "Chu Kei", and the fourteen-year-old "Matt".

== Personal life ==
Wong married TVB actress Yoyo Chen on 11 November 2011. Their daughter was born in April 2012.

== Filmography ==
=== Television dramas (TVB) ===
Year	English title	Original title	Role	Notes
2008	Wars of In-Laws	野蠻奶奶大戰戈師奶	Mark	Ep. 11–20
2008	Your Class or Mine	尖子攻略	Benny Ching Kwok-ho	Supporting Role
2009	Born Rich	富貴門	Tiger Szeto Fung	Supporting Role
2010	Can't Buy Me Love	公主嫁到	Yu Man-kit	Ep. 27–32
2010	Gun Metal Grey	刑警	PI Carson Ko Kei-yeung	Major Supporting Role My AOD Favourites Award for My Favourite Most Promising Male Artiste
2010	Home Troopers	居家兵團	Leo Tong Sau-lai	Major Supporting Role
2011	Dropping by Cloud Nine	你們我們他們	Gary	Ep. 5
2012	Wish and Switch	換樂無窮	Wayne Wing Yiu	2nd Male Lead
2012	Tiger Cubs	飛虎	Yau Chun-hin	Major Supporting Role
2012	Highs and Lows	雷霆掃毒	Yau Chun-hin	Guest Appearance in Ep. 30
2012	Silver Spoon, Sterling Shackles	名媛望族	Jimmy Chung Kai-yip	Major Supporting Role
2012–13	Friendly Fire	法網狙擊	Duncan Tang Kai-sin	Major Supporting Role TVB Anniversary Award for Most Improved Male Artiste
2013	Season of Love	戀愛季節	Simon Fung Sau-man	Ep. 11–15 TVB Anniversary Award for Most Improved Male Artiste
2013	Sergeant Tabloid	女警愛作戰	Tung Siu-leung	Ep. 1, 21
2013	A Change of Heart	好心作怪	Eason Tong Sin-chi	Major Supporting Role TVB Anniversary Award for Most Improved Male Artiste
2013	Will Power	法外風雲	Gilbert Sung Ka-yiu	Supporting Role TVB Anniversary Award for Most Improved Male Artiste
2013	Coffee Cat Mama	貓屎媽媽	Yam Ka-ching	Major Supporting Role
2014	Swipe Tap Love	愛我請留言	Edward Wong Chi-cheung	Major Supporting Role
2014	ICAC Investigators 2014	廉政行動2014	Jacky	Episode 5: "Partner"
2014	Tomorrow Is Another Day	再戰明天	Kiu Ching-kiu (Q Sir)	Major Supporting Role StarHub TVB Award for My Favourite TVB Supporting Actor
2015	Brick Slaves	樓奴	Jack Lau Yiu-ming	1st Male Lead
2015	With or Without You	東坡家事	Chun Siu-yau	Major Supporting Role
2016	Over Run Over	EU超時任務	Hugo "Ditch" Kwan Ding-ming	1st Male Lead StarHub TVB Award for My Favourite TVB Male TV Characters; TVB Star Awards Malaysia for Favourite TVB Onscreen Couple (with Tracy Chu); TVB Anniversary Award for Most Popular Onscreen Partnership (with Chu)
2016	Dead Wrong	致命復活	Max Hong Sing-chit	Major Supporting Role
2017	My Unfair Lady	不懂撒嬌的女人	"Saving" Ching Yat-fai	2nd Male Lead StarHub TVB Award for My Favourite TVB Onscreen Couple (with Natalie Tong)
2017	Legal Mavericks	踩過界	Man San-hap	1st Male Lead TVB Anniversary Award for Best Actor StarHub TVB Award for My Favourite TVB Actor; TVB Star Awards Malaysia for Favourite TVB Drama Characters
2017	Heart and Greed	溏心風暴3	Kyle Wong Wai-ka	2nd Male Lead
2018	Fist Fight	兄弟	"Fever" Cheung Fei-fan	1st Male Lead
2019	The Man Who Kills Troubles	解決師	Orson Ngo Hei-sun (O Sir) / Karson	1st Male Lead
2020	Al Cappuccino	反黑路人甲	Cheung Sai-lun / Chiang Sai-lung	1st Male Lead TVB Anniversary Award for Most Popular Onscreen Partnership (with Owen Cheung and Brian Chu)
2020	Legal Mavericks 2020	踩過界II	Man San-hap	1st Male Lead TVB Anniversary Award for Best Actor; TVB Anniversary Award for Favourite TVB Actor in Malaysia
2021	Murder Diary	刑偵日記	Ip King-fung / Chu Kei / Matt / Michael	1st Male Lead
2024	Justice Sung Begins	狀王之王	Song Sai-kit	1st Male Lead
2024	Darkside of the Moon	黑色月光	Shing Fung (Morris)	1st Male Lead

=== Television dramas (Shaw Brothers Pictures) ===
Year	English title	Original title	Role	Notes
2020	The Impossible 3	非凡三俠	Jackson	Guest Appearance
2022	Mission Run	廉政狙擊·黑幕	Wai Kai-ming	Main Role

=== Film ===
Year	Title	Role	Notes
2006	Cocktail		
2007	Super Fans		
2008	Storm Rider Clash of the Evils	Constable	Voice
2010	Black Ransom	Spring	
2011	I Love Hong Kong		
2019	Love You, You're Perfect, Now Change!		
2019	Guilt by Design	Lam Pak-ming	
2020	The One Billion Dollar Inspector	Xu Le	
2022	Pretty Heart	Ho Keung-keung (KK Ho)	
2023	Extras for Chasing The Dragon	Xu Le	

== Discography ==
=== Albums ===
Title	Release date	Song list
Never Exhausted	9 May 2006	1. 訊號; 2. 別怕; 3. 愛與被愛 (with Hailie Yeung); 4. 愛妳便愛; 5. 誘心人; 6. 不散不見; 7. 幸福年代 (in Mandarin); 8. 愛與不愛 (in Mandarin; with Hailie Yeung)
Show Everywhere	21 December 2006	1. Somewhere; 2. 貓步; 3. Baby Boy; 4. 分手不分開; 5. 拖字闕 (with Charmaine Fong); 6. Sorry; 7. Sometime; 8. 說...愛; 9. 觸電 (in Mandarin); 10. Sorry (in Mandarin)

=== TVB drama theme songs ===
Year	Title	Notes
2008	"Most Difficult to Pass Today" (最難過今天)	War of In-Laws II Interlude (with Myolie Wu)
2016	"Cannot Be Told" (不可告人)	Dead Wrong Theme Song
2017	"Insight" (心眼)	Legal Mavericks series Theme Song
2017	"Lost For Words" (欲言又止)	Heart and Greed Ending Theme Song (with Hana Kuk)
2018	"Outstanding" (非凡)	Fist Fight Theme Song
2019	"Unaffordable" (愛不起)	The Man Who Kills Troubles Ending Theme Song
2020	"It's Not Real" (似真如假)	Al Cappuccino Theme Song
2020	"Becoming You" (甘心替代你)	Al Cappuccino Interlude
2021	"Skylight" (天窗)	Murder Diary Theme Song
2021	"Butterfly Effect" (蝴蝶效應)	Murder Diary Interlude (with Hana Kuk)

=== Other songs ===
Year	Title	Notes
2008	"哪時此刻"	Collaboration with Myolie Wu
2017	"Walk with You" (Duet Version)	Collaboration with Kayee Tam

== Acting awards ==
=== TVB Anniversary Awards ===
Year	Category	Drama / Role	Result
2010	Best Supporting Actor	Gun Metal Grey — "Ko Kei-yeung (Carson)"	Nominated
2012	Best Supporting Actor	Silver Spoon, Sterling Shackles — "Chung Kai-yip (Jimmy)"	Nominated
2012	Most Improved Male Artiste	Wish and Switch, Tiger Cubs, Silver Spoon, Sterling Shackles	Nominated
2013	Most Improved Male Artiste	Friendly Fire, Season of Love, Sergeant Tabloid, A Change of Heart, Will Power	Won
2014	Best Supporting Actor	Tomorrow Is Another Day — "Kiu Ching-kiu"	Nominated
2014	Most Popular Male Character	Tomorrow Is Another Day — "Kiu Ching-kiu"	Nominated
2015	Best Actor	Brick Slaves — "Lau Yiu-ming (Jack)"	Nominated
2015	Most Popular Male Character	Brick Slaves — "Lau Yiu-ming (Jack)"	Nominated
2015	Best Supporting Actor	With or Without You — "Chun Siu-yau"	Nominated
2016	Best Actor	Over Run Over — "Kwan Ding-ming"	Top 5
2016	Most Popular Male Character	Over Run Over — "Kwan Ding-ming"	Top 5
2016	Most Popular Onscreen Partnership	Over Run Over (with Tracy Chu)	Won
2017	Best Actor	Legal Mavericks — "Man San-hap"	Won
2017	Most Popular Male Character	My Unfair Lady — "Ching Yat-fai (Saving)"	Top 5
2017	Most Popular Onscreen Partnership	Legal Mavericks (with Owen Cheung)	Nominated
2018	Best Actor	Fist Fight — "Cheung Fei-fan (Fever)"	Top 5
2018	Most Popular Male Character	Fist Fight — "Cheung Fei-fan (Fever)"	Nominated
2018	Favourite Actor in Malaysia	Fist Fight — "Cheung Fei-fan (Fever)"	Top 3
2018	Favourite Actor in Singapore	Fist Fight — "Cheung Fei-fan (Fever)"	Nominated
2019	Best Actor	The Man Who Kills Troubles — "Ngo Hei-sun (Orson)"	Top 5
2019	Most Popular Male Character	The Man Who Kills Troubles — "Ngo Hei-sun (Orson)"	Top 5
2020	Best Actor	Legal Mavericks 2020 — "Man San-hap"	Won
2020	Favourite Actor in Malaysia	Legal Mavericks 2020 — "Man San-hap"	Won
2020	Most Popular Male Character	Al Cappuccino — "Cheung Sai-lun"	Top 5
2020	Most Popular Onscreen Partnership	Al Cappuccino (with Owen Cheung and Brian Chu)	Won
2021	Best Actor	Murder Diary — "Yip King-fung"	Top 10
2021	Favourite Actor in Malaysia	Murder Diary — "Yip King-fung"	Top 5
2021	Most Popular Male Character	Murder Diary — "Yip King-fung"	Nominated
2021	Most Popular Onscreen Partnership	Murder Diary (with Benjamin Yuen)	Nominated

=== StarHub TVB Awards ===
Year	Category	Drama / Role	Result
2015	My Favourite TVB Supporting Actor	Tomorrow Is Another Day — "Kiu Ching-kiu"	Won
2016	My Favourite TVB Actor	Over Run Over — "Kwan Ding-ming"	Nominated
2016	My Favourite TVB Male TV Characters	Over Run Over — "Kwan Ding-ming"	Won
2016	My Favourite TVB Onscreen Couple	Over Run Over (with Tracy Chu)	Nominated
2017	My Favourite TVB Actor	Legal Mavericks — "Man San-hap"	Won
2017	My Favourite TVB Male TV Characters	Legal Mavericks — "Man San-hap"	Nominated
2017	My Favourite TVB Onscreen Couple	My Unfair Lady (with Natalie Tong)	Won

=== My AOD Favourites Awards ===
Year	Category	Drama / Role	Result
2011	My Favourite Most Promising Male Artiste	Gun Metal Grey — "Ko Kei-yeung (Carson)"	Won

=== TVB Star Awards Malaysia ===
Year	Category	Drama / Role	Result
2014	Favourite TVB Supporting Actor	Tomorrow Is Another Day — "Kiu Ching-kiu"	Nominated
2014	Favourite TVB Drama Characters	Tomorrow Is Another Day — "Kiu Ching-kiu"	Nominated
2015	Favourite TVB Drama Characters	Brick Slaves — "Lau Yiu-ming (Jack)"	Nominated
2015	Favourite TVB Supporting Actor	With or Without You — "Chun Siu-yau"	Nominated
2016	Favourite TVB Actor	Over Run Over — "Kwan Ding-ming"	Nominated
2016	Favourite TVB Drama Characters	Over Run Over — "Kwan Ding-ming"	Nominated
2016	Favourite TVB Onscreen Couple	Over Run Over (with Tracy Chu)	Won
2017	Favourite TVB Actor	Legal Mavericks — "Man San-hap"	Top 3
2017	Favourite TVB Drama Characters	Legal Mavericks — "Man San-hap"	Won
2017	Favourite TVB Onscreen Couple	My Unfair Lady (with Natalie Tong)	Top 3
2017	Favourite TVB Onscreen Couple	Legal Mavericks (with Sisley Choi and Tracy Chu)	Nominated

=== People's Choice Television Awards ===
Year	Category	Drama / Role	Result
2016	People's Choice Best Actor	Over Run Over — "Kwan Ding-ming"	Top 6 (Ranked 2nd)
2017	People's Choice Best Actor	Legal Mavericks — "Man San-hap"	Top 5 (Ranked 2nd)
2021	People's Choice Best Actor	Murder Diary — "Yip King-fung"	Nominated

=== Hong Kong Television Awards ===
Year	Category	Drama / Role	Result
2017	Best Leading Actor in Drama Series	Legal Mavericks — "Man San-hap"	Top 5 (Ranked 2nd)

=== Yahoo！Asia Buzz Awards ===
Year	Category	Drama / Role	Result
2017	Television Male Artiste Award	—N/a	Won
2020	Popular TV Male Character	Al Cappuccino — "Cheung Sai-lun"	Won

== Music awards ==
=== Jade Solid Gold Best 10 Awards Presentation ===
Year	Category	Song	Result
2006	Most Popular Collaboration Songs	《愛與被愛》(with Hailie Leung)	Silver Award
2006	Most Popular New Artistes	—N/a	Nominated
2007	Rising New Artiste	—N/a	Nominated
2007	Most Popular Singer-songwriters	—N/a	Nominated
2008	Most Popular Collaboration Songs	Most Difficult to Pass Today (with Myolie Wu)	Bronze Award
2016	Jade Solid Gold Songs	Cannot Be Told	Won
2016	Most Popular Male Singer	—N/a	Nominated
2017	Jade Solid Gold Songs	Insight	Nominated
2017	Jade Solid Gold Songs	Walk With You (with Kayee Tam)	Nominated
2017	Best Collaboration Songs	Walk With You (with Kayee Tam)	Gold Award
2017	Best Collaboration Songs	Lost For Words (with Hana Kuk)	Bronze Award
2019	Jade Solid Gold Songs	Unaffordable	Nominated
2019	Best Original Songs	Unaffordable	Gold Award
2019	Most Popular Male Singer	—N/a	Nominated
2019	Popularity King (Male Singer)	—N/a	Won
2020	Jade Solid Gold Songs	It's Not Real	Nominated
2020	Jade Solid Gold Songs	Becoming You	Nominated
2020	Best Arrangement Songs	Becoming You	Won
2020	Most Popular Male Singer	—N/a	Nominated
2020	Popularity King (Male Singer)	—N/a	Won

=== TVB Anniversary Awards ===
Year	Category	Song	Result
2016	Most Popular Theme Song	Cannot Be Told	Nominated
2017	Most Popular Theme Song	Insight	Nominated
2017	Most Popular Theme Song	Lost For Words (with Hana Kuk)	Nominated
2018	Most Popular Theme Song	Outstanding	Nominated
2019	Most Popular Theme Song	Unaffordable	Nominated
2020	Most Popular Theme Song	It's Not Real	Nominated
2020	Most Popular Theme Song	Becoming You	Nominated
2021	Most Popular Theme Song	Skylight	Nominated
2021	Most Popular Theme Song	Butterfly Effect (with Hana Kuk)	Nominated

=== Other awards ===
Year	Award / Ceremony	Category	Song	Result
2005	TVB8 Mandarin Music On Demand Awards Presentation	Best New Male Artistes	—N/a	Bronze Award
2006	Hit Awards	Hit New Male Singers	—N/a	Won
2006	Hit Awards	Hit Collaboration Songs	《愛與被愛》(with Hailie Leung)	Won
2006	Hong Kong Top Sales Music Award	Bestseller New Male Artistes	—N/a	Won
2017	TVB Star Awards Malaysia	Favourite TVB Drama Theme Song	Insight	Nominated
2017	Jade Solid Gold Songs Election Round Two	Best Songs	Insight	Nominated
2017	Jade Solid Gold Songs Election Round Two	Best Songs	Walk With You (with Kayee Tam)	Nominated
2017	Yahoo！Asia Buzz Awards	Popular TV Drama Theme Collaboration Song	Walk With You (with Kayee Tam)	Won
2017	Hong Kong Television Awards	Original Song	Insight	Top 5 (Ranked 4th)
2021	People's Choice Television Awards	People's Choice Best Theme Song	Butterfly Effect (with Hana Kuk)	Nominated
