= List of Tiger Cubs characters =

Tiger Cubs is a police procedural television drama series set in Hong Kong. Produced by Lam Chi-wah and written by Lee Yee-wah, Tiger Cubs is a TVB production. The original series, Tiger Cubs, aired in the summer of 2012. Its sequel Tiger Cubs II aired in the fall of 2014.

The drama revolves around a team of elite paramilitary officers from the Special Duties Unit (SDU) of the Hong Kong Police Force, a unit that focuses on cracking down terrorism, hostage rescue, and handling any other crimes that are deemed too dangerous for regular police to handle. The unit also works closely with the Organised Crime and Triad Bureau (OCTB), which specialises in investigating organised crime and triad societies.

== Special Duties Unit ==
=== Chin Hon-to ===
- Portrayed by Joe Ma
- Episodes: 1.01—present

Senior Inspector Chin Hon-to (展瀚韜; jyutping: Zin Hontou) is an SDU officer, as well as the leader and main trainer of the unit's alpha team. Known as SDU's "demon trainer," To is tough, strict, and demanding. To's emphasis on the importance of team spirit is one of the reasons why he initially disapproves of alpha team's new member Yu Hok-lai, who is rash and overconfident. Having that his father, a police officer who was forced into early retirement because he was suspected of violating a conduct code, To is extremely cautious and rigorous when handling team missions. Despite To's austere demeanor, he can be kindhearted and friendly, and often treats his teammates to happy hour at the pub owned by his parents. To also follows his own rigorous training techniques with his subordinates, earning the respect of his team.

While on a vacation with his teammate and best friend, Chong Chuk-yuen, To meets the air flight attendant Ting Wai-wai, and pursues her after falling in love at first sight. After a few months of dating, Wai-wai decides to move in with To. However, To and Wai-wai gradually grew apart due to his commitment to his work and Wai-wai's long weeks away from home. He eventually fell for Yuen's older sister and their mutual respect and similar personalities sparked a relationship, which sadly ended when Wah found herself still unable to let go of her fiancee's death, despite how much she tried.

=== So Man-keung ===
- Portrayed by Mandy Wong
- Episodes: 1.01—present

Probationary Inspector So Man-keung (蘇文強; jyutping: Sou Mankoeng) is a probationary inspector, currently working as an administrative support officer for SDU's alpha team. Keung grew up in an unspecified walled village in New Territories, Hong Kong. Her parents and older brother immigrated to the United Kingdom soon after she joined the police force.

Keung's childhood dream is to officially join SDU's operation team as the unit's first female member, but due to her fear of heights, an obstacle that she will have to face when applying for the SDU selection, Keung sees her dreams getting harder to achieve. Yu Hok-lai is the only member in the alpha team who knows of Keung's fear, and he helps her overcome it episode 11. They eventually begin a relationship following Tiger Cubs II.

=== Chong Cheuk-yuen ===
- Portrayed by Oscar Leung
- Episodes: 1.01—present

Acting Sergeant Chong Chuk-yuen (莊卓源; jyutping: Zong Coekjyun) is an SDU sniper of the unit's alpha team. He is the younger brother of Chong Chuk-wah, the senior inspector of OCTB's A Division. Due to Yuen's carefree and joking personality, many mistaken him to possess a careless and casual attitude towards work. However, Yuen's careful and calm judgement makes him one of the most talented sharpshooters in the unit.

Yuen develops a crush on Ting Wai-wai, whom he met while on a vacation with his best friend, To. However, Wai-wai takes an interest at To, and begins to date him soon after their encounter, prompting Yuen to merely view her as a "sister-in-law". When To is unavailable to go on dates with Wai-wai, Yuen fills in his spot as Wai-wai's confidant. This causes Wai-wai to fall for him eventually, causing conflict between Yuen and To. The rift driving them apart due to this is eventually settled over time, as To stops caring for Wai-wai romantically and moves on with his life.

=== Yau Chun-hin ===
- Portrayed by Vincent Wong
- Episodes: 1.01—1.13

Acting Sergeant Yau Chun-hin (邱駿軒; jyutping: Jau Zeonhin) is an SDU sniper of the unit's alpha team. He joins the team in the first episode with Yu Hok-lai, also his best friend. Lai's older brother is an accomplished law enforcer personnel, and because of this, Hin always felt like he is living under the shadow of his brother, causing him to be extremely unconfident (though this trait dissipates as time passes and Hin improves). He acts as a foil to the originally overconfident and arrogant Lai, and is often the first to bail him out of trouble or help him out. In Episode 13, the finale of Tiger Cubs, Hin shoots the motor of the boat that To Tin-yu and Yiu Mei-ling tried escaping in. This led to Yiu Mei-ling to suffer from third degree burns, and her face became scarred, prompting Yu and Mei-ling to plot revenge against Hin. They tied him to a cross and tortured him by beating him up and then burning his bare skin with hot iron, before shooting him in his legs, arms and his heart- ending his life right in front of Chin hon-to.

=== Yu Hok-lai ===
- Portrayed by Him Law
- Episodes: 1.01—present

Acting Sergeant Yu Hok-lai (俞學禮; jyutping: Jyu Hoklai) is an SDU officer of the unit's alpha team, specialising in assault and combat. Lai is the youngest son of Yu Sai-tong, one of the top ten wealthiest entrepreneurs of Hong Kong.

Originally, Lai is portrayed with an arrogant and overbearing attitude, which puts him at odds with his superior, To, despite being the physically fittest candidate for SDU. Due to this, Lai disliked To strongly and becomes convinced that the latter is intentionally making things difficult for him, not knowing that To sees great potential in him. Lai's personality improves greatly after a case revolving around his family members is solved, causing him to deeply respect To.

=== Tse Kar-sing ===
- Portrayed by Benjamin Yuen
- Episodes: 1.01—present

Acting Sergeant Tse Kar-sing (謝家星; jyutping: Ze Gaasing) is an SDU officer of the unit's alpha team, and one of the team's main assaulters.

=== Cheung Kai-kwong ===
- Portrayed by William Chak
- Episodes: 1.01—present

Acting Sergeant Cheung Kai-kwong (張繼光; jyutping: Zoeng Gaigwong) is an SDU officer of the unit's alpha team. Coming from a low-income grassroots family, Kwong is stingy and cheap, though he still gets along well with his team members, who often joke about his penny-pinching ways good-naturedly. He initially joined the SDU for its high paycheck, and has been saving money to establish his own fitness center, though he expresses that he would still want to stay in SDU until his age posed a problem.

=== Roy Poon ===
- Portrayed by Timmy Hung
- Episodes: 2.01—2.10

Chief Inspector of Police Roy Poon Chi-lung (潘子龍) introduced as the head of the Criminal Intelligence Bureau (CIB), Poon Chi-lung is transferred to be the commanding officer of A team, and in doing so must win the trust and loyalty of A team who had been expecting Chin Hon-to be promoted to the position.

=== Other characters ===
- Superintendent Leung Yat-fung (梁日鋒; jyutping: Loeng Jatfung), portrayed by Dominic Lam, is the SDU commander.
- Mother (媽打; jyutping: maadaa) / Station Sergeant Yip Shu-fai (葉樹輝; jyutping: Jip Syufai), portrayed by Savio Tsang, is an SDU officer and the sub-leader of the unit's alpha team.
- Ringmaster (掌門; jyutping: zoengmun) / Acting Sergeant Kwok Yiu-cho (郭耀祖; jyutping: Gwok Jiuzou), portrayed by Oscar Li, is an SDU officer from the alpha team.
- Dragon Lady (龍婆; jyutping: lungpo) / Acting Sergeant Lung Kim-fai (龍劍飛; jyutping: Lung Gimfei), portrayed by Raymond Tsang, is an SDU officer from the alpha team.
- Bitch (賤仁; jyutping: zinjan) / Acting Sergeant Hui Chi-yan (許志仁; jyutping: Heoi Zijan), portrayed by Wu Kwing-lung, is an SDU officer from the alpha team.
- Senior Inspector Ko Siu-lun (高兆倫; jyutping: Gou Siuleon), portrayed by Ricky Wong, is an SDU officer and leader of the unit's beta team.
- Acting Sergeant Tsui Kin-hong (徐健康; jyutping: Ceoi Ginhong), portrayed by Yeung Ching-wah, was an SDU officer from the unit's beta team. He was killed on duty in episode 9.
- Station Sergeant Lee Hung (李雄; jyutping: Lei Hung), portrayed by Brian Wong, is an SDU officer from the unit's beta team.

== Organised Crime and Triad Bureau ==
=== Chong Cheuk-wah ===
- Portrayed by Jessica Hsuan
- Episodes: 1.01—1.13

Senior Inspector Chong Chuk-wah (莊卓嬅; jyutping: Zong Coekwaa) is an inspector in the OCTB A Division. She is the older sister of Chong Chuk-yuen, an SDU sniper. Wah is a workaholic who was indicated to have plunged herself into her career in an attempt to move on from her fiancee's death two years prior to the start of the show. This ultimately failed as Wah still harbored great guilt over Bong's death, and was noted by Chin Hon-to be suicidal. She eventually starts a relationship with Chin Hon-to at the end of season one, as she prepares herself to let go of her past. However, Wah does not appear in Tiger Cubs II and was indicated to be written out of season two. Whilst in England to undergo training, she encounters the family of her deceased fiancee- Bong, and is taken to the house he had prepared as their marital home- done in detail to her exact liking so that she and Bong could move in even though the latter has died. This causes Wah to find that she cannot let go of him, despite her attempt to move on with To, leading her to send To a "Dear John" text and break up with him.

=== Other characters ===
- Ben Fong (方永彬; jyutping: Fong Wingban), portrayed by Patrick Tang
- Portrayed by Patrick Tang
- Episodes: 1.01—present

Originally Chong Chuk-wah's second in command, with the absence of Chong, Fong is the highest ranking OCTB officer on screen in season two

- May Fung (馮嘉美; jyutping: Fung Gaamei), portrayed by Kayi Cheung
- Law Siu-bor (羅小波; jyutping: Lo Siubo), portrayed by Jason Lam
- Lam Kwan (林坤; jyutping: Lam Kwan), portrayed by Tong Chun-ming

== Guest stars ==
=== Season one ===
==== 1.01: The King of Thieves Appears / 113: The King of Thieves Returns ====
- Kenneth Ma as To Tin-yu (杜天宇; jyutping: Dou Tinjyu)
- JJ Jia as Yiu Mei-ling (姚美玲; Jiu Meiling)
- Otto Chan as Ho Yat-bing (何一兵; Ho Jatbing)
- Lee Kai-kit as Leung (良; Loeng)
- Luk Chun-kwong as Pang (鵬; Paang)

==== 1.02: Loving Father ====
- Kenny Wong as Chun Sam (秦森; jyutping: Ceon Sam)
- Mandy Lam as Sam's wife
- Ho Hing-fai as Snake Ming (蛇仔明; Se Zai Ming)
- Ben Cheung as 'Suen Hon-yueng (孫向陽; Syun Honjoeng)
- Andy Sui as 'Kong Kwok-cheong (江國昌; Gong Gwokcoeng)
- Clinton Wong as Sam's friend

==== 1.03: Lai's Father Kidnapping Case ====
- Elena Kong as Jenny Yu (俞學恩; jyutping: Jyu Hokjan), Lai's older sister.
- Law Lok-lam as Yu Sai-tong (俞世棠; Jyu Saitong), Jenny and Lai's father, who gets kidnapped.
- Steven Ho as Michael Tong (唐國棟; Tong Gwokdung), Jenny's boyfriend.
- Alice Fung So-bor as Ng Oi-chee (吳愛慈; Ng Oici), Jenny and Lai's mother.
- Sin Ho-ying as Wong Kwai (王貴; Wong Gwai)

==== 1.04: The Gun-stealing Cop ====
- Henry Lee as Lam Shek-yung (林石勇; jyutping: Lam Sekjung)
- Shally Tsang as Man Shuk-fong (閔淑芳; Man Sukfong)
- Leo Tsang as Chun (泰; Ceon)

==== 1.05: Uncovering the Crack Den ====
- Dai Yiu-ming as Chung Wai-kai (鍾偉佳; jyutping: Zung Waigaai)
- Li Fung as Grandma Cheung (張婆)

==== 1.06: Attacking the Fruit Market ====
- Ngo Ka-nin as Chan Lik-hang (陳力恆; jyutping: Can Likhang)
- Wilson Tsui as Lau Ping-kui (劉秉駒; Lau Bingkeoi)
- Yu Chi-ming as Chan Hing (陳興; Can Hing)
- Lily Li as Ho Yee-mui (何二妹; Ho Jimui)
- Angel Chiang as Fung Chi-ching (馮芷晴; Fung Zicing)

==== 1.07: Young Criminal ====
- Sam Chan as Yeung Siu-chung (楊少聰; jyutping: Joeng Siucung)
- Eric Li as Kam Kwok-man (甘國文; Gam Gwokman)
- Eddie Li as Suen Man-ho (孫文浩; Syun Manhou)
- Rosanne Lui as Sister Ha (霞姐)

==== 1.08: Rich 2G Kidnapping Case ====
- Grace Wong as Larine Shu (舒子麗; jyutping: Syu Zilai)
- Alan Wan as Jacob Shu (舒子銘; Syu Ziming)
- Daniel Chau as Matthew Lim (林又廷; Lam Jauting)
- Yaka as Yuki Aono (青野雪; Cingye Syut)
- Nathan Ngai as Roy Chiang (蔣世澤; Zoeng Saizaak)
- Max Choi as Jack Wen (溫禮杰; Wan Laigit)
- Ronald Law as William Cheng (鄭威廉; Zeng Wailim)
- Brian Burrell as Solen
- Adam Ip as Yu Yat-fat (余一發; Jyu Jatfaat)
- Russell Cheung as Yeung Kwan (楊軍; Joeng Gwan)

==== 1.09: Obsessed with Military Affairs ====
- Natalie Tong as Kary Bui (裴芷琪; jyutping: Bui Zikei)
- Eddie Li as Bat Sai-wing (畢世榮; Bat Saiwing)
- Hugo Wong as Shun (信; Seon)
- Calvin Lui as On (安; On)
- Owen Ng as Tat (達; Daat)

==== 1.10: Dilemma ====
- Patrick Dunn as Hung Kin (洪堅; Hung Gin)
- Yu Yang as Nip Kai-pui (聶繼培; Nip Gaipui)
- Lam King-kong as Dick
- Deno Cheung as Kan (根; Gan)
- Wong Wai-tak as Hoi (海; Hoi)

==== 1.11: I Want to Be a Cop ====
- Derek Kok as Ting Yau-tin (丁有田; jyutping: Ding Jautin)
- Alex Lam as Tang Fuk-chai (鄧福齊; Dang Fukcai)

==== 1.12: Bomber ====
- Joseph Lee as Chim Kai-wai (詹啟維; jyutping: Zim Kaiwai)
- Yoyo Chen as Ching Yuen-ting (程婉婷; Cing Jyunting)
- Geoffrey Wong as Chin Fu-bong (錢富邦; Cin Fubong)
- Peter Lai as Ku Tak-sing (古德勝; Gu Daksing)

=== Season two ===
==== 2.01 ====
- Johnson Lee as On Tin-ming (安天命, An Tian-ming)
