= Stephanie Ho =

Hong Kong singer, actress and golfer

Stephanie Ho 何雁詩
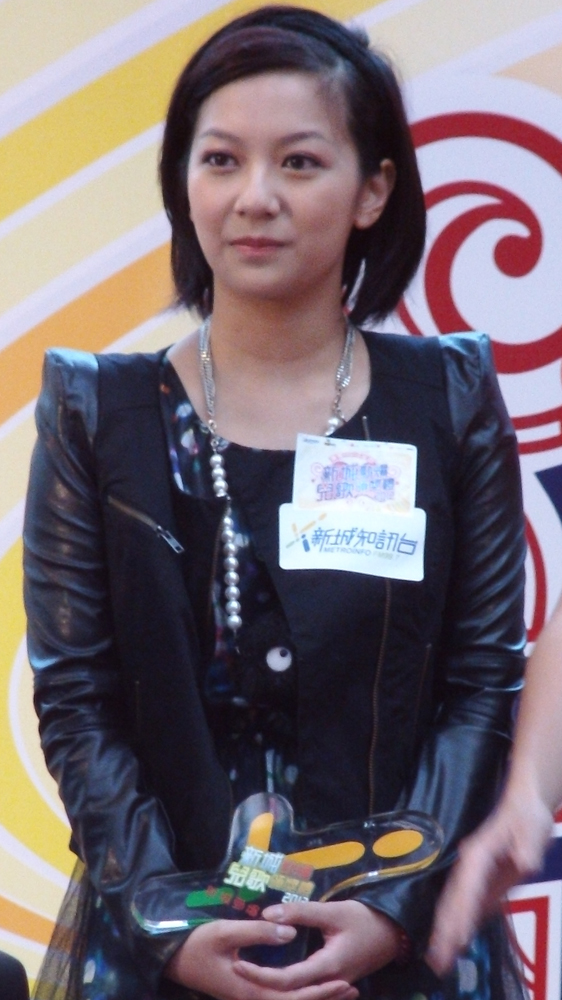
- Born: San Jose, California United States
- Occupations: Singer; actress; host; golfer
- Years active: 2009–present
- Spouse: Fred Cheng (m. 2020)
- Children: 1

Chinese name
- Traditional Chinese: 何雁詩
- Simplified Chinese: 何雁诗
Transcriptions
Standard Mandarin
- Hanyu Pinyin: Hé Yànshī
Yue: Cantonese
- Jyutping: Ho4 Ngaan6 Si1
- Musical career
- Also known as: Step, Steph, 雁詩, 阿詩, 詩詩
- Origin: Hong Kong, China
- Genres: Cantopop, pop
- Instruments: Vocals, piano, guitar
- Label: TVB (2009–2021) MusicNext (2013–2015) Voice Entertainment (2015–2019) Moving Pictures (2023–present)

Stephanie Ho Ngan-si (Chinese: 何雁詩) is a Hong Kong singer, actress, host, and former professional golfer.

== Early life ==
Ho was born in San Jose, California and grew up in Hong Kong. She is an only child. Her father is a businessman.

After completing her A-Levels she decided to study hotel and tourism management at Hong Kong Polytechnic University. In her last year of university, she suspended her studies as she had been cast in Gilded Chopsticks.

== Golf ==
Since 2011, she was a professional golfer, but in December 2017, she officially changed from a professional golfer back to an amateur golfer to give herself more chances to participate in local competitions. She consequently announced she would be participating in an amateur golf competition. On 3–5 January 2018, she competed and won the Hong Kong Ladies Close Amateur Championship for the second time after winning it in 2009, and played her first golf competition since 2010. She was later invited to play in the 2018 Hong Kong Ladies Open alongside childhood best friend and LPGA player Tiffany Chan. After making her comeback in golf, she also returned to her position as a Hong Kong National Golf Ladies' Squad Team representative.

== Personal life ==
=== Friendship ===
When filming Raising The Bar, Ho became best friends with Jeannie Chan and Moon Lau. She also shared an apartment with Jeannie Chan for a year (2015-2016). She is also close with others in the entertainment industry including Winki Lai, Sisley Choi, Anjaylia Chan, Cheronna Ng, Fred Cheung, Joey Law, Dickson Yu, Mayao Ma, Grace Chan, and William Chak. In the music industry, she is good friends with Hubert Wu, Kayee Tam, James Ng, Sophy Wong, Alfred Hui and Jason Chan.

=== Marriage and Family ===
On 6 April 2017, Ho admitted to being in a relationship with fellow singer, Fred Cheng. On 1 January 2020, Ho and Cheng announced their engagement on Instagram, and revealed that Cheng had proposed while they were on holiday in Thailand. The couple married on 7 November 2020 and held their wedding at Hyatt Regency Sha Tin, Hong Kong.

On 13 January 2022, Ho announced on Instagram that she is pregnant. Their son, Asher Douglas Cheng, was born on 1 June 2022. On his second birthday, the couple revealed Asher had been diagnosed with Angelman syndrome.

=== Mental Health ===
On 31 March 2017, Ho posted on Instagram that she would be resigning from upcoming drama My Ages Apart due to private illness. Days later, she admitted on Instagram that she had been suffering from emotional illness as she received tremendous pressure from the public regarding her private life and health. While being interviewed at an event on 31 December 2017, she said that she had recovered from depression but was still taking medication.

== Music career ==
=== Career Beginnings/Debut: 2009–2014 ===
When Ho was 16, she entered The Voice (Hong Kong) in 2009 as a contestant, which started off her singing career. Although she didn't win, she gained fame and support from the public and also received an award for being in the Top 5 viral songs sung on the show. In 2013, she signed with MusicNext and released her first single "淚如鐵". In 2014, she made her official debut and achieved multiple best new artist awards. She released her first album, STEP, on 28 November 2014.

=== Voice Entertainment/Rise in Popularity: 2016–2019 ===
The following year, Ho finished her contract with MusicNext and signed with Voice Entertainment. She officially joined on 24 March 2015 but did not release her first single with the company until 2016 due to her busy schedule of filming dramas. After releasing "最真心一對" (True Lovers), she received positive feedback and continued to sing many drama theme songs. In November, she starred in the drama Dead Wrong as well as singing the ending theme song, "愛需要勇氣" (Love Takes Courage).

On 24 January 2017, she released her second album, Lost In Love, which reached No.1 Album in Asian Pop at HMV Hong Kong. It also came in 1st runner-up in the KKBOX Top Albums of 2017. In March, she sang a duet with Fred Cheng, "真心真意" (With All My Heart), as the theme song for Married but Available. In May, she sang "我不會撒嬌" (I Would Not Pout) as the opening theme song for My Unfair Lady. The music video received more than 1 million views in less than a month. It topped iTunes, KKBOX, JOOX, MOOV charts as well as achieving a gold song award at the annual JSG Awards Presentation 2017. It also became one of the Top 10 HK YouTube Music Videos of 2017. On June 24, she released "愛近在眼前" (In Front Of Love) as the ending theme song for Legal Mavericks, this also being the second part of her hit song "愛需要勇氣" (Love Takes Courage).

On 28 June 2019, Ho released her first single in two years, 包庇 (Tear Can't Speak), working with music producer, Schumann (舒文). On October 8, she released "我會想念他" (Thoughts Of Love) as the ending theme song of Finding Her Voice.

=== Independent Singer: 2020–2021 ===
On 11 March 2020, Ho released her first single as an independent singer, "致有夢想的人", written and produced by Cousin Fung. On 26 June 2020, Ho released "絕望時請點播", which was co-written by herself and Cousin Fung, and produced by Randy Chow. On 10 August 2020, she released the ending theme song of Al Cappuccino, 對手戲 (Opponent), her last drama song with Voice Entertainment. On 19 October 2020, she released "基本戀愛套路", which she also co-wrote with Cousin Fung. On 14 March 2021, she independently released her fourth song, "灰夠". On 15 April 2021, she released her EP, Que Será, Será, which comprised all the songs she had released as an independent singer.

== Discography ==
=== Albums ===
#	Name	Album Type	Label	Release date	Songs
1	STEP	Album	MusicNext	28 November 2014	1. 淚如鐵; 2. I Don't Care; 3. 綿羊仔; 4. 洞天; 5. 放過; 6. 線上情歌 duet with Fred Cheung; 7. Bread; 8. 眼淚 (Mandarin); 9. 小綿羊 (Mandarin)
2	Lost In Love	Album	Voice Entertainment	24 January 2017	1. 愛需要勇氣 (Love Takes Courage) - Dead Wrong ending theme song 2. 只想可以跟你走 (Take Me With You); 3. 太想討好你 (Pleasing You); 4. 真心真意 (With All My Heart) duet with Fred Cheng - Married but Available theme song 5. 最真心一對 (True Lovers) - Over Run Over theme song 6. 夢裡花 (Fragile Love) - The Imperial Doctress theme song 7. 三人行 (Threesome); 8. 我和你 (You and I) - Raising The Bar theme song 9. 很想愛下去 (Love Goes On)
3	Que Será, Será	EP	-	15 April 2021	1. 基本戀愛套路; 2. 致有夢想的人; 3. 灰夠; 4. 絕望時請點播

=== Other songs/singles ===
Year	Song	Album
2010	撲火 (Queen Seondeok theme song)	超級巨聲 The Voice
2010	幸福節奏 (Home Troopers theme song)	
2012	一起闖蕩去 (When In Taiwan theme song) with Hubert Wu & James Ng	
2012	Go! Go! Sunshine (Jewelpet Sunshine theme song)	
2012	Separate Lives (Divas in Distress sub song) duet with King Lam	
2012	If You Don't Know Me By Now (Divas in Distress sub song)	
2013	假如真的再有約會 (Come On, Cousin sub song)	
2014	忠臣 (Gilded Chopsticks theme song) duet with Wong Cho Lam	
2015	閃耀的寶石 (Jewelpet Happiness theme song)	
2016	愛情食物鏈 (Love as a Predatory Affair theme song)	
2016	財神到 with Voice Entertainment Singers	
2016	The Only One (Blue Veins sub song)	
2016	講 (Come With Me theme song) with Sharon Chan, Grace Wong, Louis Yuen, Hoffman Cheng, Ronald Law	
2017	盼望極光 (Anchors With Passport 3 theme song) with Fred Cheng & Kayee Tam	
2017	我不會撒嬌 (My Unfair Lady theme song)	My TV Love Songs
2017	愛近在眼前 (Legal Mavericks ending theme song)	
2017	二缺一 duet with Hubert Wu	到此一遊
2019	包庇	
2019	我會想念他 (Finding Her Voice ending theme song)	
2020	對手戲 (Al Cappuccino ending theme song)	
2023	the right kind	
2023	tiger in you	
2024	野馬	

== Filmography ==
=== TVB ===
==== Television Dramas ====
Year	Drama	Chinese title	Role	Notes
2011	Dropping By Cloud Nine	你們我們他們	Sue	Minor Role (episode 3)
2012	Highs and Lows	雷霆掃毒	TV Host	Cameo Appearance (episode 16)
2013	Triumph in the Skies II	衝上雲霄II	Cherry	Cameo Appearance (episode 7)
2013	The Hippocratic Crush II	On Call 36小時II	Jane Tam Oi-Chun - youth (譚愛珍)	Guest Appearance (episode 14)
2014	Gilded Chopsticks	食為奴	Mai Siu-Yu (米小魚)	Major Supporting Role
2015	Raising the Bar	四個女仔三個BAR	Chris Yiu Chui-Fa (姚翠花)	Major Supporting Role
2016	Love as a Predatory Affair	愛情食物鏈	Kimchi Yeung Kam-Chi (楊金枝)	Major Supporting Role
2016	Blue Veins	殭	Ting Heung (丁香)	Guest Appearance (episode 27)
2016	Dead Wrong	致命復活	Tracy Lam Chui-Yee (林翠宜)	Major Supporting Role
2017	Recipes to Live By	味想天開	Dung Ming-Yuet (董明玥)	Major Supporting Role
2017	Line Walker: The Prelude	使徒行者2	雀雀	Special Appearance (episode 1)
2018	Succession War	天命	Gurun Princess Hexiao (固倫和孝公主)	Major Supporting Role
2019	Finding Her Voice	牛下女高音	Melissa Chan Mei-Sze (陳美斯)	Supporting Role
2020	The Exorcist's 2nd Meter	降魔的 2.0	Couple (情侶)	Guest Appearance (episode 3)

==== Host ====
Year	Show	Chinese title	Other hosts / Notes
2011	360°		Hubert Wu, James Ng
2012	360°		Hubert Wu, James Ng
2012	When In Taiwan	台灣闖蕩	Hubert Wu, James Ng
2012	When In Taiwan 2	台灣闖蕩2	Hubert Wu, Jay Fung
2013	360°		James Ng
2014	J.S.G Music	勁歌金曲	Voice Entertainment singers
2014	The Voice 4 (Hong Kong)	超級巨聲4	Sammy Leung, Kayee Tam (episode 11–13)
2015	J.S.G Music	勁歌金曲	Voice Entertainment singers
2015	2015 JSG Selections Part 1	2015勁歌金曲優秀選第一回	James Ng, Kayee Tam, Hoffman Cheng, Ronald Law
2015	Walking Tours	賞遊澳門	Tammy Ouyang, Alycia Chan, Christy Chan, Vicky Chan
2016	J.S.G Music	勁歌金曲	Voice Entertainment singers
2016	I Heart HK	我愛香港	Eric Tsang, TVB actors/actresses
2017	Anchors With Passport 3	這個冬天不太冷	Fred Cheng, Kayee Tam
2017	The Ultimate Street Sorcerer	終極街頭魔法王	Louis Yan, Bob Lam, Bella Lam, William Chak, Luk Ho
2019	Liza's Online	娛樂大家	Guest Host
2020	Liza's Online 10:30	娛樂大家10點半	Guest Host

=== Film ===
Year	Film	Chinese title	Character	Role
2011	The Fortune Buddies	勁抽福祿壽	Customer (顧客)	Cameo Appearance
2021	Time	殺出個黃昏	Choi Fung - youth (蔡鳳)	Minor Role

== Music Awards ==
=== 2010 ===
- The Voice (Hong Kong) – Top 5 Viral Songs (On My Own)
- Approaching The Youngsters Music Contest 2010 (CMB Korea) – 1st Runner-up (Silver) with Alfred Hui
- 2010 JSG Selections Part 1 – Song (Supervoice) with singers from The Voice (Hong Kong)
- JSG Awards Presentation 2010 – Outstanding Performance Award (Silver) with singers from The Voice (Hong Kong)

=== 2012 ===
- Metro Showbiz Hit Children's Songs 2010 – Hit Children's Song Award (Go! Go! Sunshine)

=== 2014 ===
- Metro Showbiz Hit Awards 2014 – New Female Debut Singer Award (Gold)
- Metro Showbiz Hit Awards 2014 – Hit Duet Award (線上情歌) with Fred Cheung
- RTHK Top 10 Gold Songs Awards 2014 – Most Promising Future Newcomer Award (Bronze)
- Canada Most Hit Cantonese Song Charts – Canada's Most Praised New Female Artist
- JSG Awards Presentation 2014 – Most Popular New Artist (Bronze)
- IFPI Hong Kong Sales Awards 2014 – Bestselling Female Newcomer Award

=== 2016 ===
- 2016 JSG Selections Part 1 – Song (最真心一對) (True Lovers)
- 2016 JSG Selections Part 2 – Song (只想可以跟你走) (Take Me With You)
- King of Music Global Chinese Music Awards – Best Progress Award
- Metro Showbiz Hit Awards 2016 – Metro Top 12 Singers
- JSG Awards Presentation 2016 – Outstanding Performance Award
- JSG Awards Presentation 2016 – Gold Song (愛需要勇氣) (Love Takes Courage)
- Cantonese Song Charts Awards – Outstanding Progress Award

=== 2017 ===
- 2017 JSG Selections Part 1 – Song (我不會撒嬌) (I Would Not Pout)
- Chinese Golden Melody Awards 2017 – Jumping Singer Award
- 2017 JSG Selections Part 2 – Song (愛近在眼前) (In Front Of Love)
- YouTube Top 10 HK Music Video – 9th Place (我不會撒嬌) (I Would Not Pout)
- JSG Awards Presentation 2017 – Gold Song (我不會撒嬌) (I Would Not Pout)

=== 2020 ===
- 2020 JSG Selections Part 1 – Song (致有夢想的人)
- AEG Music Channel Awards 2020 – Diamond Female Singer-Songwriter Award
- AEG Music Channel Awards 2020 – Diamond Popular Idol Award
- 2020 JSG Selections Part 2 – Song (對手戲) (Opponent)
- Metro Showbiz Hit Awards 2020 – Hit Independent Musician Award
- JSG Awards Presentation 2020 – Gold Song (對手戲) (Opponent)

== Film Awards and Nominations ==
=== Starhub TVB Awards ===
Year	Award	Drama/Show	Role/Song	Result
2015	My Favourite Drama Theme Song	四個女仔三個BAR (Raising the Bar)	我和你 (You & I)	Nomination
2016	My Favourite Drama Theme Song	愛情食物鏈 (Love As A Predatory Affair)	愛情食物鏈 (Love Chain)	Nomination
2016	My Favourite Drama Theme Song	EU超時任務 (Over Run Over)	最真心一對 (True Lovers)	Nomination
2017	My Favourite Drama Theme Song	不懂撒嬌的女人 (My Unfair Lady)	我不會撒嬌 (I Would Not Pout)	Nomination
2017	My Favourite Drama Theme Song	踩過界 (Legal Mavericks)	愛近在眼前 (In Front Of Love)	Nomination

=== TVB Star Awards Malaysia ===
Year	Award	Drama/Show	Role/Song	Result
2015	My Favourite Top 16 Drama Characters	四個女仔三個BAR (Raising the Bar)	姚翠花 (Chris Yiu Choi-Fa)	Nomination
2015	My Favourite TVB Drama Theme Song	四個女仔三個BAR (Raising the Bar)	我和你 (You & I)	Nomination
2016	My Favourite Most Improved TVB Actress	愛情食物鏈 (Love As A Predatory Affair)	楊金枝 (Kimchi Yeung Kam-Kei)	Nomination (Top 3)
2016	My Favourite Drama Theme Song	EU超時任務 (Over Run Over)	最真心一對 (True Lovers)	Nomination
2016	My Favourite TVB Variety Program	我愛香港 (I Heart HK)	Host	Nomination
2016	My Favourite TVB Host(s) In A Variety Program	我愛香港 (I Heart HK)	Host	Nomination
2017	My Favourite TVB Variety Program	這個冬天不太冷 (Anchors With Passport 3)	Host with Fred Cheng & Kayee Tam	Nomination
2017	My Favourite TVB Drama Theme Song	踩過界 (Legal Mavericks)	愛近在眼前 (In Front Of Love)	Nomination

=== TVB Anniversary Awards ===
Year	Award	Drama/Show	Role/Song	Result
2014	Most Popular Drama Theme Song	食為奴 (Gilded Chopsticks)	忠臣 (Loyal) duet with Wong Cho-Lam	Nomination
2015	Best Supporting Actress	四個女仔三個BAR (Raising the Bar)	姚翠花 (Chris Yiu Choi-Fa)	Nomination
2015	Most Popular Female Character	四個女仔三個BAR (Raising the Bar)	姚翠花 (Chris Yiu Choi-Fa)	Nomination
2015	Most Popular Drama Theme Song	四個女仔三個BAR (Raising the Bar)	我和你 (You & I)	Nomination (Top 5)
2016	Most Improved Female Artiste	愛情食物鏈, 殭, 致命復活, 勁歌金曲, 我愛香港	楊金枝 (Kimchi Yeung Kam-Kei), 丁香 (Ding Heung), 林翠宜 (Tracy Lam Tsui-Yee), Host	Nomination
2016	Best Variety Show	我愛香港 (I Heart HK)	Host with TVB actors/actresses	Won
2016	Most Popular Drama Theme Song	愛情食物鏈 (Love As A Predatory Affair)	愛情食物鏈 (Love Chain)	Nomination
2016	Most Popular Drama Theme Song	EU超時任務 (Over Run Over)	最真心一對 (True Lovers)	Nomination
2016	Most Popular Drama Theme Song	殭 (Blue Veins)	The Only One	Nomination
2016	Most Popular Drama Theme Song	女醫·明妃傳 (The Imperial Doctress)	夢裡花 (Fragile Love)	Nomination
2016	Most Popular Drama Theme Song	致命復活 (Dead Wrong)	愛需要勇氣 (Love Takes Courage)	Nomination (Top 3)
2017	Best Supporting Actress	味想天開 (Recipes To Live By)	董明玥 (Dung Ming-Yuet)	Nomination
2017	Best Non-Drama Programme	這個冬天不太冷 (Anchors With Passport 3)	Host with Fred Cheng & Kayee Tam	Nomination
2017	Best Non-Drama Programme	終極街頭魔法王 (The Ultimate Street Sorcerer)	Host with Louis Yan, Bella Lam, William Chak, Bob Lam, Luk Ho	Nomination
2017	Most Popular Drama Theme Song	我瞞結婚了(Married But Available)	真心真意 (With All My Heart) duet with Fred Cheng	Nomination
2017	Most Popular Drama Theme Song	不懂撒嬌的女人 (My Unfair Lady)	我不會撒嬌 (I Would Not Pout)	Nomination
2017	Most Popular Drama Theme Song	踩過界 (Legal Mavericks)	愛近在眼前 (In Front Of Love)	Nomination
2018	Best Supporting Actress	天命 (Succession War)	固倫和孝公主 (Gurun Princess Hexiao)	Nomination
2019	Most Popular Drama Theme Song	牛下女高音 (Finding Her Voice)	我會想念他 (Thoughts Of Love)	Nomination
2020	Most Popular Drama Theme Song	反黑路人甲 (Al Cappuccino)	對手戲 (Opponent)	Nomination
