= Tiger Cubs II =

Hong Kong television series

- Official poster
- 飛虎II
- Genre: Police procedural Action; Drama
- Created by: Lam Chi-wah
- Written by: Ho Ching Yee 何靜怡; Leung Si Yun 梁絲韵
- Directed by: Yiu Tin tong 姚天堂
- Starring: Joe Ma; Linda Chung; Him Law; Oscar Leung; Mandy Wong; Benjamin Yuen; Christine Kuo
- Opening theme: Blood, Sweat and Tears 血與汗 by Joe Ma
- Composer: Damon Chui 徐洛鏘
- Country of origin: Hong Kong
- Original language: Cantonese
- No. of episodes: 10

Production
- Executive producer: Lam Chi Wah 林志華
- Production location: Hong Kong
- Editor: Yip Tin Sheng 葉天成
- Camera setup: Multi camera
- Running time: 120 minutes
- Production company: TVB

Original release
- Network: TVB Jade (Hong Kong); TVB HD Jade (Hong Kong); TVBJ (Australia, Singapore); Astro Wah Lai Toi (Malaysia); Astro Wah Lai Toi HD (Malaysia); HTV2 (Vietnam)
- Release: Invalid date range

Related
- Tiger Cubs (2012); Flying Tiger (2018); Flying Tiger 2 (2019)

Tiger Cubs II
- Chinese: 飛虎II
- Literal meaning: "flying tigers 2"
Transcriptions
Standard Mandarin
- Hanyu Pinyin: Fēi Hǔ
Yue: Cantonese
- Yale Romanization: Fēi Fú

Tiger Cubs II (Chinese: 飛虎II; Cantonese Yale: Fēi Fú; literally "flying tigers 2"), alternatively titled Special Duties Unit II, is a 2014 Hong Kong police procedural television drama produced by TVB under executive producer Lam Chi-wah. The serial premiered on Sunday, 19 October 2014 on Jade, HD Jade in Hong Kong, TVBJ in Australia, Singapore and Astro Wah Lai Toi, Astro Wah Lai Toi HD in Malaysia. It stars Joe Ma, Linda Chung, Him Law, Oscar Leung, Mandy Wong, Benjamin Yuen and Christine Kuo as the casts of the second installment. It over the time slot previously occupied by Shades of Life.

It is the sequel to Tiger Cubs, which was aired in the summer of 2012. The series follow a fictional team of elite paramilitary officers from the Special Duties Unit of the Hong Kong police force, a team that specialises in counter-terrorism, hostage rescue, and crimes that are deemed too dangerous for regular police to handle.

== Cast ==
=== Special Duties Unit (SDU) ===
Character	Actor	Description
SP Roy Poon (潘子龍)	Timmy Hung	SDU commander
SIP Chin Hon-to (展瀚韜)	Joe Ma	A Team leader
WIP So Man-keung (蘇文強)	Mandy Wong	A Team cadet
ASGT Chong Chuk-yuen (莊卓源)	Oscar Leung	A Team sniper
ASGT Tse Kar-sing (謝家星)	Benjamin Yuen	A Team assaulter
ASGT Yu Hok-lai (俞學禮)	Him Law	A Team assaulter
ASGT Nick Wu (胡力全)	Ho Chun-hin	A Team assaulter
ASGT Kwok Tak-wai (郭德偉)	Quinn Ho	A Team sniper
ASGT Chui Ka-ming (徐家明)	Jack Hui	A Team assaulter
PC Ko Chi-ho (高智昊)	Matthew Ko	A Team member
PC Lam Man-fai (林文輝)	Vin Choi	A Team member
PC Yeung Kong (楊剛)	Clayton Li	A Team member

=== Criminal Intelligence Bureau (CIB) ===
Character	Actor	Occupation
ASGT Cheung Kai-kwong (張繼光)	William Chak	Team acting sergeant
WPC Chung Wai-yan (鍾韋恩)	Linda Chung	Team constable; former undercover
SIP Tam Ka-chung (譚家聰)	Wong Wai-tak	Team senior inspector
PC Ma Chun-choi (馬進財)	Lam King-kong	Team constable
PC Chu Yuk-chung (朱玉松)	Kitterick Yiu	Team constable
SP Lau Chi-fai (劉志輝)	Billy Cheung	Team superintendent

=== Organized Crime and Triad Bureau (OCTB) ===
Character	Actor	Occupation
IP Ben Fong (方永彬)	Patrick Tang	Team inspector
ASGT Lung Kim-fai (龍劍飛)	Raymond Tsang	Team acting sergeant
PC Lee Kwan (李坤)	King Lam	Team constable
WPC Cheung Yee (章兒)	Ip Ting-chi	Team constable

=== Supporting characters ===
Actor	Character
Bowie Wu	Chin Chung-kei
Christine Kuo	Ting Wai-wai
Nancy Wu	Kam Sau-kei

== Episodes ==
No.	Title	Directed by	Written by	Original release date	HK viewers (millions)	Rating
1	"High Court Storm"	-	-	19 October 2014	N/A	TBA
2	"True & False Drug Dealers"	-	-	26 October 2014	N/A	TBA
3	"Disability Grant"	-	-	2 November 2014	N/A	TBA
4	"God's Justice Will Rule"	-	-	9 November 2014	N/A	TBA
5	"Tiger's Heart, Part 1"	-	-	16 November 2014	N/A	TBA
6	"Tiger's Heart, Part 2"	-	-	23 November 2014	N/A	TBA
7	"Zhongxiao's Virtue"	-	-	7 December 2014	N/A	TBA
8	"Stock's Storm"	-	-	14 December 2014	N/A	TBA
9	"After Thief Appears, Part 1"	-	-	21 December 2014	N/A	TBA
10	"After Thief Appears, Part 2"	-	-	4 January 2015	N/A	TBA

== Viewership ratings ==
Episode	Date	Average ratings	Peaking Points
1	Oct 19, 2014	25	27
2	Oct 26, 2014	22	24
3	Nov 2, 2014	22	23
4	Nov 9, 2014	21	23
5	Nov 16, 2014	20	21
6	Nov 23, 2014	19	21
7	Dec 7, 2014	21	22
8	Dec 14, 2014	20	-
9	Dec 21, 2014	19	-
10	Jan 4, 2015	22	24

== Accolades ==
Year	Ceremony	Category	Nominee	Result
2015	StarHub TVB Awards	My Favourite TVB Drama	Tiger Cubs II	Nominated
2015	StarHub TVB Awards	My Favourite TVB Actress	Linda Chung	Nominated
2015	StarHub TVB Awards	My Favourite TVB Supporting Actor	Oscar Leung	Nominated
2015	StarHub TVB Awards	My Favourite TVB Supporting Actress	Mandy Wong	Nominated
2015	StarHub TVB Awards	My Favourite TVB Female TV Character	Linda Chung	Nominated
2015	StarHub TVB Awards	My Favourite Onscreen Couple	Joe Ma & Linda Chung	Nominated
