= Officer Geomancer =

Hong Kong television series

- Official poster
- 八卦神探
- Genre: Crime drama
- Created by: Hong Kong Television Broadcasts Limited
- Starring: Johnson Lee; Joey Meng; Oscar Leung; Rebecca Zhu; Harriet Yeung; Law Lok-Lam; Mimi Chu; Mak Ling Ling; Law Lan; Fred Cheng
- Opening theme: Rebel 造反 by Fred Cheng
- Country of origin: Hong Kong
- Original language: Cantonese
- No. of episodes: 20

Production
- Producer: Nelson Cheung
- Production location: Hong Kong
- Camera setup: Multi camera
- Running time: 45 minutes
- Production company: TVB

Original release
- Network: TVB Jade, HD Jade
- Release: 16 December 2014 – 9 January 2015

Related
- Overachievers; Madam Cutie On Duty

Hong Kong Chinese title
- Chinese: 八卦神探
- Literal meaning: "Busybody Detective"
Transcriptions
Yue: Cantonese
- Yale Romanization: baat gwa sàhn taam

Officer Geomancer (Chinese: 八卦神探; Cantonese Yale: baat gwa sàhn taam) is a TVB comedy detective drama produced by Nelson Cheung, starring Johnson Lee and Joey Meng.

== Synopsis ==
Sit Dan Yan (Johnson Lee) is not an ordinary police constable. He is an expert in geomancy, which he uses at critical moments to solve mysterious cases. He also has Leung Sing Kau (Oscar Leung), who is connected with people conducting both legal and illegal activities, as his informant. His outlandish character often leaves his superior, Che Gwai Fei (Joey Meng), astonished. She is a criminal psychologist who uses rationale to analyze everything. They appear to be polar opposites, yet through working together, they develop an unspoken mutual understanding. Outside of work, she only cares about the marriages of her younger siblings, Che Gwai Yan (Harriet Yeung) and Che Gwai Gwan (Frederick Cheng). When Che Gwai Mei becomes involved in a love triangle with Leung Sing Kau and Tit Leung Chi (Rebecca Zhu), Che Gwai Mei loses control of her emotions. Luckily, Sit Dan Yan is there to help. At this time, a series of missing persons cases occur. The culprit's modus operandi evokes Sit Dan Yan's memories of the past, which he has been hiding for many years.

== Cast and characters ==
Cast	Role	Description
Johnson Lee	Sit Dan Yan	Protagonist, CID Sergeant; Expert at Geomancy, uses it to solve unsolvable cases Che Gwai Fei Boyfriend
Joey Meng	Che Gwai Fei	CID Inspector; Sit Dan Yan's Superior and Girlfriend
Oscar Leung	Leung Sing Kau	Sit Dan Yan's Informant connections with legal and illegal activities Tit Leung Chi Ex Fiancee; Che Gwai Mei Boyfriend
Rebecca Zhu	Tit Leung Chi	Constable/Subordinate of Che Gwai Fei; Leung Sing Kau Ex Fiancee; Caa Gam Loi Wife
Harriet Yeung	Che Gwai Mei	Works in a magazine company Che Gwai Fei's younger sister Develops crush on Leung Sing Kau and Fiancee
Law Lok-Lam	Ha Man Zik	Constable/Sit Dan Yan's colleague Fong Yuen Yuen and Soffia love interest
Mimi Chu	Fong Yuen Yuen	Che Gwai Fei's Superior; Like Ha Man Zik; Sofia's rival
Mak Ling Ling	Sofia Dong Cheuk	Owns a Small Magazine company Che Gwai Mei's boss Like Ha Man Zik; Fong Yuen Yuen's rival
Law Lan	Chong Mong Dip	Feng Shui master Sit Dan Yan's Mother
Fred Cheng	Che Kwai Kwan	Younger brother of Gwai Fei and Gwai Mei; Sou Sin Man Boyfriend
Sisley Choi	Sou Sin Man	University Student; Che Kwai Kwan Girlfriend
William Chak	Caa Gam Loi	Forensic expert, Tit Leung Chi's love interest and Husband
Candice Chiu	Shirley Chung Hoi Yu	Mysterious woman who has connection to Yung. Friend of Sit Dan Yan. Revealed to be Sit Dan's long lost buddy Yung after a sex change operation
KK Cheung	Tit Shek Sum	Owner of Guoshukan; Tit Leung Chi's father
Rosanne Lui	Chan Yiu Ngo	Mother of missing Daughter (Cheung Oi Lam)
Hebe Chan	Cheung Oi Lam	Chan Yiu Ngo's Daughter

== Development ==
Bobby Au-yeung was originally cast as the main lead, but due to a schedule conflict, second lead Johnson Lee replaced him. Lee's original role was replaced by Oscar Leung

== Viewership Ratings ==
Week	Episodes	Date	Average Points	Peaking Points
1	01-04	December 16–19, 2014	24	25
2	05-09	December 22–26, 2014	24	26
3	10-14	December 29, 2014 – January 2, 2015	24	26
4	15-20	January 5–9, 2015	25	29
Total average			24.25	29

== Awards and nominations ==
Year	Ceremony	Category	Nominee	Result
2015	StarHub TVB Awards	My Favourite TVB Actress	Joey Meng	Nominated
2015	StarHub TVB Awards	My Favourite TVB Female TV Character	Joey Meng	Nominated
2015	StarHub TVB Awards	My Favourite TVB Theme Song	Rebel (造反) by Fred Cheng	Nominated
2015	TVB Star Awards Malaysia	My Favourite TVB Actor in a Leading Role	Johnson Lee	Nominated
2015	TVB Star Awards Malaysia	My Favourite TVB Actor in a Supporting Role	Oscar Leung	Nominated
2015	TVB Star Awards Malaysia	My Favourite TVB Actress in a Supporting Role	Rebecca Zhu	Nominated
2015	TVB Anniversary Awards	TVB Anniversary Award for Best Drama	Officer Geomancer	Nominated
2015	TVB Anniversary Awards	TVB Anniversary Award for Best Actor	Johnson Lee	Nominated
2015	TVB Anniversary Awards	TVB Anniversary Award for Best Supporting Actress	Helena Law	Nominated
2015	TVB Anniversary Awards	TVB Anniversary Award for Most Popular Male Character	Oscar Leung	Nominated
2015	TVB Anniversary Awards	TVB Anniversary Award for Favourite Drama Song	Rebel (造反) by Fred Cheng	Nominated

== International broadcast ==
- Malaysia - 8TV (Malaysia)
