= Miss Hong Kong 2013 =

Beauty pageant

- Date: September 1, 2013
- Venue: TVB City, Hong Kong
- Broadcaster: TVB
- Entrants: 20
- Winner: Grace Chan

The Miss Hong Kong 2013 Pageant (2013年度香港小姐競選) was held in the TVB City on September 1, 2013. 20 delegates completed for the title.

Miss Hong Kong 2012 Carat Cheung crowned her successor Grace Chan (陳凱琳) at the end of the pageant. Grace Chan went on to represent Hong Kong at the Miss Chinese International Pageant 2014 and won.

== Results ==
=== Placements ===
Final results	Contestant
Miss Hong Kong 2013	17. Grace Chan 陳凱琳
1st runner-up	15. Sisley Choi 蔡思貝
2nd runner-up	6. Moon Lau 劉佩玥
3rd runner-up	9. Virginia Lau 劉溫馨
4th runner-up	20. Vicky Chan 陳偉琪

=== Special awards ===
These awards were given during the telecast of the pageant on August 25:

- Miss Photogenic: 17. Grace Chan (陳凱琳)
- Miss Friendship: 13. Tammy Ou-Yang (歐陽巧瑩)

== Contestant list ==
No.	Contestant	Age	Height	Measurements	Occupation
1	Kendy Cheung 張敬仁	26	5'3"	32½"–22"– 33"	大學畢業生
2	Whitney Law 羅紫君	22	5'3"	32"–24"– 33½"	大學畢業生
3	Tessy Yu 余思慧	23	5'7½"	33"–24½"– 35½"	大學畢業生
4	Iris Lee 李曉東	23	5'4¾"	33"–23"– 34"	大學畢業生
5	Ashley Chu 朱智賢	27	5'7¾"	32"–23"– 35"	財經公關
6	Moon Lau 劉佩玥	23	5'8½"	33½"–24"– 35"	項目主任
7	Acca Sum 沈桂澄	19	5'3"	31½"–22"– 31½"	學生
8	Susan Tse 謝海珊	27	5'4¾"	32½"–23½"– 34"	營養師
9	Virginia Lau 劉溫馨	22	5'7"	33½"–24½"– 36"	學生
10	Michelle Liem 林伊麗	24	5'7"	34½"–24½"– 34½"	學生
11	Summer Ng 吳瑋雯	23	5'6"	34"–25½"– 37"	學生
12	Karen Leung 梁家欣	22	5'6½"	33"–23"– 34"	學生
13	Tammy Ou-Yang 歐陽巧瑩	20	5'4¾"	34"–24"– 33½"	銷售主任
14	Sara Lam 林思韻	26	5'7½"	34½"–24½"– 34"	獸醫
15	Sisley Choi 蔡思貝	22	5'4½"	31"–24"– 33"	學生
16	Peggy Tsui 徐韶蓓	26	5'4¾"	33½"–24½"– 34"	模特兒
17	Grace Chan 陳凱琳	22	5'4"	30"–22"– 33"	大學畢業生
18	Cherry Cheung 張雪瑩	21	5'4½"	32½"–23½"– 34½"	學生
19	Natalie Siu 蕭穎詩	24	5'4"	33½"–25"– 35½"	大學畢業生
20	Vicky Chan 陳偉琪	22	5'4"	34½"–25"– 34½"	學生

== Points ranking ==
Miss Hong Kong 2013 followed a point system ranking to determine contestants on a placement of the top 10 contestants

Ranking	Contestant	Overall Points		Judge Points		Audience Points
冠軍 Champion	17號陳凱琳	61.51	1	29.45	1	32.06
亞軍 1st Runner Up	15號蔡思貝	41.86	2	21.29	2	20.56
季軍 2nd Runner Up	6號劉佩玥	27.52	3	15.39	3	12.12
第四名 4th Place	9號劉溫馨	23.06	4	11.38	4	11.68
第五名5th Place	20號陳偉琪	12.22	5	6.63	6	5.58
第六名 6th Place	1號張敬仁	8.15	7	3.57	7	4.58
第七名 7th Place	7號沈桂澄	8.06	6	5.91	10	2.14
第八名 8th Place	13號歐陽巧瑩	7.89	9	2.10	5	5.79
第九名 9th Place	12號梁家欣	5.53	8	2.27	8	3.26
第十名 10th Place	16號徐韶蓓	4.14	10	1.96	9	2.17
Total marks		200		100		100
