= Recipes to Live By =

Television series

- Official poster
- Also known as: Peculiar Taste
- 味想天開
- Genre: Historical period drama
- Created by: Hong Kong Television Broadcasts Limited
- Written by: Wong Bing-yee, Chan Po-yin, Wong Bo-yin, Yim Lai-wah
- Starring: Tony Hung; Sisley Choi; Hugo Wong; Rebecca Zhu; Stephanie Ho; Ram Chiang; Joseph Lee; Mary Hon; Maria Cordero; Toby Leung; William Chak
- Theme music composer: Alan Cheung
- Opening theme: "The Taste of Heaven" (天賜的滋味) by Maria Cordero
- Country of origin: Hong Kong
- Original language: Cantonese
- No. of episodes: 25

Production
- Executive producer: Catherine Tsang
- Producer: Chong Wai-kin
- Production location: Hong Kong
- Editor: Wong Bing-yee
- Camera setup: Multi camera
- Running time: 45 minutes
- Production company: TVB

Original release
- Network: TVB Jade
- Release: 2 January – 3 February 2017

Recipes to Live By
- Traditional Chinese: 味想天開
- Simplified Chinese: 味想天开
- Cantonese Yale: meih séung tìn hòi
- Literal meaning: "Peculiar Taste"
Transcriptions
Standard Mandarin
- Hanyu Pinyin: Wèixiǎng Tiānkāi
- Bopomofo: ㄨㄟˋ ㄒㄧㄤˇ ㄊㄧㄢ ㄎㄞ
- IPA: [wêi.ɕjàŋ tʰjɛ́n.kʰái]
Yue: Cantonese
- Yale Romanization: meih séung tìn hòi
- Jyutping: Mei6soeng2 Tin1hoi1
- Sidney Lau: Meihséung Tīnhōi
- IPA: [mèi.sœ̌ːŋ tʰíːn.hɔ́ːy]

Recipes to Live By (Chinese: 味想天開; Cantonese Yale: Meihséung Tīnhōi; literally "Peculiar Taste") is a 2017 Hong Kong television costume historical period comedy drama produced by Chong Wai-kin for TVB, starring Tony Hung and Sisley Choi as the main leads, with Hugo Wong, Rebecca Zhu, Stephanie Ho, Ram Chiang, Joseph Lee, Mary Hon, Maria Cordero, Toby Leung and William Chak as the main cast. It premiered on Hong Kong's TVB Jade and Malaysia's Astro On Demand on January 2, 2017 airing Monday through Friday during its 8:30 to 9:30 pm timeslot and concluding February 3, 2017 with a total of 25 episodes.

Recipes to Live By is set in ancient China with a food theme plot. The drama centers on god of cookery with Tony Hung playing Ding Yat-san, a poor village boy who is a foodie. However his true lineage is much more complicated than he knows.

== Synopsis ==
Village boy Ding Yat-san (Tony Hung) was born with a golden tongue, which makes him able to distinguish bad and good tasting foods with one bite. Yat-san is also gifted at cooking but his father Ding Yat forbids him from cooking as every time he cooks a dish something bad happens to his father. Wanting to show off his skills Yat-san runs away to the city of Yeungchou to enter a cooking contest against famous chef Koi Siu-tin, (Hugo Wong). While lining up to enter the city Yat-san, meets and offends local bandit Sek Yau (Sisley Choi), when he cuts her in line. Sek Yau, who is dressed as a male to disguise herself is a small time bandit and drug dealer. Trying to hide incriminating evidence against her when imperial guards search her, Yau's drugs are accidentally eaten by Yat-san's pet pig. While trying to retrieve his pet pig from Yau, Yat-san gets entangled in Yau's mess and soon Yau gets entangled in Yat-san's mess. With only Yau to help him, Yat-san has Yau enter the cooking contest while he assist her. Yau and Yat-san's contest dish gets them noticed as it is comparable to the former God of Cookery and soon Sui-tin's father wants to know what is the connection between Yat-san and the former disgraced God of Cookery who was found guilty of treason when he was framed for food poisoning imperial officials.

== Cast ==
=== Ding family ===
- Ram Chiang as Ding Yat (丁日)

Ding Yat-san's adoptive father. Originally named Mok Fat-choi (莫發財), a servant of Yat-san's real father Tong Hin-yan, the imperial chef to the Emperor. His job was to guard the dishes but an act of irresponsibility where he sneaked out to save his lover causes dishes prepared for imperial officials to be laced with poison. Being the only survivor of the imperial chef's household he is tasked with hiding Yat-san's real identity and raising him.

- Tony Hung as Ding Yat-san (丁一山)

Ding Yat's adoptive son. He talks with a lisp. Born with a gold tongue he is gifted in food tasting and cooking. Originally named Tong Wan-jo (湯尹祖). His real father Tong Hin-yan, was an imperial chef to the Emperor however to steal his families treasured recipe book his father was framed for treason and killed by imperial guards. Yat-san is not allowed to cook as his dad Yat tells him that they are cursed with bad things to happen to them if he does. Feeling his talent is wasted Yat-san runs away to Yeungchow to show off his talents. He meets small time bandit Sek Yau on his arrival to the city. The two starts off as enemies but Yau seduces Yat-san and he later develops romantic feelings for her.

=== Sek family ===
- Mary Hon as Mai Gwai (米桂)

Sek Yau's mother. A gambling addict who racked up a huge debt with loan sharks, forcing Sek Yau to do devious things such as conning people, selling drugs and fake prostitution in order to pay off her debt.

- Sisley Choi as Sek Yau (石柔)

Mai Gwai's daughter. In order to survive and pay off her mother's gambling debts she pretends to be a man in order to con people and sell drugs. Once the loan sharks find out she is really a female they sell her into prostitution to pay off her mother's debts. Her wits protect her but Yat-san tries to save her and the two end up spending a night together. After their supposed one night together, Yat-san starts to develop romantic feelings for her, which she uses to her advantage.

=== Koi family ===
- Henry Lo as Koi Bak-chun (蓋百川)

Koi Siu-tin's father. He is owner of the most prestigious restaurant in the city. Obsessed with having his son be the best cook, he underhandedly steals recipe books and takes credit for other cooks creations. Ding Yat-san becomes an instant threat when he arrives at the city because he is aware that Yat-san cooking is up to par with the former god of cooking and is better than his son Siu-tin.

- Hugo Wong as Koi Siu-tin (蓋兆天)

Koi Bak-chun's son. He is the most popular and best chef in the city. Seeing potential in Ding Yat-san during a cooking contest, he later befriends him.

=== The Fifth family ===
- Rosanne Lui as The Fifth Lin (第五蓮)

Yuen's mother and Ding Yat's former lover. She is the owner of a vegetarian restaurant that is managed by an all female staff. She has a hatred for men as she said she was abandoned by Yuen's father and had to raise Yuen all by herself.

- Rebecca Zhu as The Fifth Yuen (第五緣)

Lin's daughter and maybe Ding Yat's daughter. She is a talented chef at her mother's vegetarian restaurant, however she is unhappy with life at the vegetarian restaurant and looks for an escape. Ding Yat-san befriends her when Ding Yat lies to him that she is his birth younger sister.

- Helen Ng as Man Chun-fai (孟春花)
- Samantha Chuk as Lo Lai-giu (魯來嬌)

=== Dung family & household ===
- Joseph Lee as Dung Hon-yik (董瀚億)

The richest man in the city. He owns and is in charge of the food distribution companies in the city which makes him able to set prices and gets the best ingredients. Dung Eng-kit and Ming-yuet's father.

- William Chak as Dung Eng-kit (董英傑)

Dung Hon-yik's son and Dung Ming-yuet's older brother. He is an Imperial Constable who is in cahoots with his father's plans. The Dung family maid Chau Yee is his love interest.

- Stephanie Ho as Dung Ming-yuet (董明玥)

Dung Hon-yik's daughter and Dung Eng-kit's younger sister. She is always seeking her father's acceptance which get Yat-san to noticed that she is not very bright.

- Aurora Li as Chau Yee (秋兒)

Dung Ming-yuet's personal maid and Dung Eng-kit's love interest.

=== Extended cast ===
- Toby Leung as Ah Chau (阿丑), a mole sent by Dung Hon-yik for a secret mission. Her face is disfigured due to a large birthmark.
- Maria Cordero as Ho Tai-lei (何大莉), a Persian princess that have stayed in Yeungchow for love reasons within decades.
- Sam Tsang as Tong Hin-yan (湯顯仁), Ding Yat-san's biological father who died 20 years ago. He was called the God of Kitchen and was framed for food poisoning and imperial government official.
- Leo Lee as Chuk But-fan (卓不凡)
- KK Cheung as Ko Tian-li (高千里)
- Steve Lee as Yim Lo-wong (閻羅王)
- Savio Tsang as Governor (王爺)
- Lily Leung as Senior Lady Cai Ng (齊五娘)
- Anderson Junior as Lee Bun (李斌)
- Chan Wing-chun as Siu Hai-chung (蕭孝祥)

== Development and production ==
- The costume fitting ceremony was held on September 21, 2015 12:30 pm at Tseung Kwan O TVB City Studio One Common Room.
- The blessing ceremony was held on October 21, 2015 3:00 pm at Tseung Kwan O TVB City Studio Twelve.
- Filming took place from September 2015 till February 2016, entirely on location in Hong Kong. Majority of filming took place at TVB studios for interior scenes and the newly built TVB Ancient City back lot for exterior setting.

== Awards and nominations ==
Association	Category	Nominee	Result
TVB Star Awards Malaysia	My Favourite TVB Drama Series		Nominated
2017 TVB Anniversary Awards|TVB Anniversary Awards	Best Drama		Nominated
2017 TVB Anniversary Awards|TVB Anniversary Awards	Best Actor	Tony Hung	Nominated
2017 TVB Anniversary Awards|TVB Anniversary Awards	Best Supporting Actress	Stephanie Ho	Nominated
2017 TVB Anniversary Awards|TVB Anniversary Awards	Most Popular Male Character	Tony Hung	Nominated
2017 TVB Anniversary Awards|TVB Anniversary Awards	Most Improved Male Artiste	Hugo Wong	Nominated
2017 TVB Anniversary Awards|TVB Anniversary Awards	Most Improved Female Artiste	Rebecca Zhu	Nominated
2017 TVB Anniversary Awards|TVB Anniversary Awards	Most Popular Drama Theme Song	"天賜的滋味" (The Taste of Heaven) by Maria Cordero	Nominated

== Viewership Ratings ==
#	Timeslot (HKT)	Week	Episode(s)	Average points	Peaking points
1	Mon – Fri (8:30-9:30 pm); 20:30–21:30	02 – 06 Jan 2017	1 — 5	22.4	24.0
2	Mon – Fri (8:30-9:30 pm); 20:30–21:30	09 – 13 Jan 2017	6 — 10	22.0	--
3	Mon – Fri (8:30-9:30 pm); 20:30–21:30	16 – 20 Jan 2017	11 — 15	22.8	--
4	Mon – Fri (8:30-9:30 pm); 20:30–21:30	23 – 27 Jan 2017	16 — 20	20.1	--
5	Mon – Fri (8:30-9:30 pm); 20:30–21:30	30 Jan – 03 Feb 2017	21 — 25		
Total average					
