= Blue Veins (TV series) =

Hong Kong television series

- Official poster
- Also known as: Vampire
- 殭
- Genre: Supernatural; Fantasy; Romance
- Created by: Hong Kong Television Broadcasts Limited
- Written by: Yip Tin-shing; Lo Mei-wan; Chan Po-yin
- Starring: Kevin Cheng; Kay Tse; Grace Chan; Wong You-nam; Anjaylia Chan; Luk Wing; Winki Lai; Joel Chan; Eddie Kwan; Moon Lau; Hubert Wu; Law Lan
- Theme music composer: Endy Chow; Goro Wong
- Opening theme: Immortal Chaos (諸神混亂) by Kay Tse
- Country of origin: Hong Kong
- Original languages: Cantonese; Mandarin
- No. of episodes: 33

Production
- Executive producer: Catherine Tsang
- Producer: Joe Chan
- Production locations: Hong Kong; Netherlands
- Editors: Yip Tin-shing; Lo Mei-wan; Chan Po-yin
- Camera setup: Multi camera
- Running time: 45 minutes
- Production company: TVB

Original release
- Network: TVB Jade
- Release: 11 April – 15 May 2016

Blue Veins
- Chinese: 殭
- Simplified Chinese: 僵
- Cantonese Yale: Gēung
- Literal meaning: "Vampire"
Transcriptions
Standard Mandarin
- Hanyu Pinyin: Jiāng
- Bopomofo: ㄐㄧㄤ
Yue: Cantonese
- Yale Romanization: Gēung
- Jyutping: Goeng1
- IPA: [kœ́ːŋ]

Blue Veins (Chinese: 殭; Cantonese Yale: Gēung; literally "Vampire") is a 2016 Hong Kong supernatural television drama produced by Joe Chan Wai-Kun for TVB, starring Kevin Cheng, Kay Tse and Grace Chan. Filming took place from April to July 2015 on location in Hong Kong and the Netherlands. It premiered on Hong Kong's TVB Jade and Malaysia's Astro On Demand on April 11, 2016, airing Monday through Sunday during its 9:30-10:30 pm timeslot.

The fictional show is about nine immortal humans who fight against vampires.

== Plot ==
Five hundred years ago, ten members of Kam-Yi-Wai took an order to kill a group of vampires of unknown origins. All except one were killed by vampires. After the vampires left, the nine Kam-Yi-Wai's dead bodies were struck by lightning and turned into super powered immortals. In the present, the nine immortal humans hide amongst the people, seeking and killing vampires. They believe that they can be mortal again if they kill all the vampires.

Lam Mung-Nam is a vampire who has lost her memories and abilities as a vampire after drinking purified spring water and has been adopted by Wong Chi-Hung, a retired doctor. Living as a human and working as a forensics medical doctor, Mung-Nam resides with her human sister, Lam Mung-Yiu, who has been unable to speak for over a decade after witnessing the deaths of her parents at the hands of vampires. Meanwhile, Mung-Nam's former lover, immortal Ying Wut-Zoek, watches over her while running a Japanese restaurant.

During a trip to the Netherlands, Mung-Yiu and her friends supernatural enthusiastic "Ghost" Yau Ling-Mui, martial arts students Ho Nin and Ho Yuet, and Mung-Nam's forensic lab assistant C-Kun become involved with supernatural occurrences after Ghost steals a ring from the tomb of vampire Xenia. Despite Xenia appearing to request the return of the ring, Ghost refuses and takes it back to Hong Kong. The group discovers vampires appearing frequently in Hong Kong. When Ho Nin, Ho Yuet, and C-Kun's martial arts master Kam Kin is killed, Ying becomes their new master at the dying behest of Kam Kin and begins to train them as vampire hunters. Meanwhile, Mung-Nam has begun to reawaken as a vampire and regain her lost memories, and begins to desperately find a cure to vampirism.

== Cast ==
=== Main ===
Cast	Role	Description
Kevin Cheng	Ying Wut-zeok/Ying Yin 刑活著 (homophone to Still alive, 仍活著)	undead human and vampire hunter. Late My Night (Chinese night stall) Owner/Chef Later, he temporarily turns back into an ordinary human due to Mung-Nam dripping some of her vampire blood containing water from the purifying spring in episode 28 onto his mortal wound. He gains back his undead human powers after Ying-tin is killed off by the blinded vampire in episode 31.
Kay Tse	Lam Mung-Nam 藍夢南	Forensic Pathologist, Amelia, one of the first-generation vampires, but wants to live as a human. Lam Mung-Yiu's adopted older sister. She has the ability to revive the dead for one minute. She and Sheldon was assigned to retrieving a large amount of BR48 component from the past for the developing the vampire contagious virus cure (antiviral medicine) by Dr. Taylor in the year 2115 . She was infected with the vampire virus when the four bottle of virus fluid was spill and she bit Sheldon during the process whilst travelling in the time space wormhole through a space ship and becomes a super vampire. After that the space ship encounter a space-time storm causing it to wreck in the past leading her and Sheldon to both land in the wrong time period with amnesia. She wander for five hundreds years with amnesia at same time she and Ying are closed by in a location but never a chance to meet until present day. She befriended Lam Wong Chi-hung in the 1900s and save Yo-Yo from a vampire attack that kll her parents ten years ago. She was given a temporary cure (small amount of BR480) by Xenia in Netherlands that suppressed her vampire powers for ten years and erased her memory once more. She recovers her memory back after being bitten by Ling Feng in episode 32 and goes back to the future after discovering the antibiotic medicine in episode 33. Eventually, she becomes human again and is together with Ying Wut-zeok in episode 33.
Grace Chan	Sheung-Kun Kam-Ling 上官金鈴	a magician living during the Ming Dynasty and Ying's wife at the time. She committed suicide in fear of letting the unaging Ying see her grow old whilst he remained young.
Grace Chan	Yo-Yo Lam Mung-Yiu 藍夢瑤	a university biology student and later Kam-Tin Medical Factory's research assistant. Mung-Nam's adopted younger sister. Her parents were killed by vampires ten years ago. She allows Ling Fung to turn her into a vampire episode 25 because she believes that Ying will return her love if she cannot die from old age as Kam-Ling would. She is thrown into the future portal by Ling Fung in episode 33 while trying to save her sister.

=== Humans ===
- Law Lan as Lam Wong Chi-hung (藍黃紫紅) (literally blue, yellow, purple, red), a retired doctor, Mung-Nam's friend and later adopted grandmother.
- Wong You-nam as Ho Nin (何年) (literally what year), a comic writer and also Kin's student; he is later Ying's student, and subsequently Mui's boyfriend.
- Anjaylia Chan (陳嘉寶) as Ho Yuet (何月) (literally what month), Ho Nin's younger sister. She is a university student and an archer. She is Kin's student, and later Ying's student. She is the only student who is better than her brother and C Kwan in martial arts, although she only learns martial arts as a hobby. C Kwan is later her love interest. Later in episode 29, she turns into a zombie after being bitten by Ling Fung and she tries to kill Ying. She passes away in episode 32 and leaves all her last words with Lam Mung-Nam's "1-minute back alive" ability.
- Lai Wai-ling as Ghost Yau Ling-mui (丘玲梅) (homophone of ghost whisperer, 幽靈媒), a fortune teller in university and Ho Yuet's best friend. She is obsessed with the supernatural. She is later Nin's wife and they have a son called Ho Yat (何日) (same as what day).
- Luk Wing (陸永) as "C Kwan (C君)" Kan Ting-si (簡霆斯) (homophone of choose first, 揀定先), an assistant forensic pathologist. He is also Kin's student, and later Ying's student. He has so much difficulty in choosing things that he often can't make decisions on his own. He later has a crush on Ho Yuet.
- Moon Lau (劉佩玥) as Rosa, Pong Ying-tin's Assistant, Employee of Kam-Tin Medical Factory. Supervisor of Yo-Yo. Killed Yat-ming to avenged Pong Ying-tin and finally committed suicide finally committed suicide in Pong Ying-tin ’s grave. episode 31. Has feelings for Pong Ying-tin since he save her from child smugglers when she was a kid.
- Chun Wong (秦煌) as Kam Kin (金堅) (literally as hard as gold)
  - Jazz Lam as young Kam Kin, Ying Wot-zeok best friend. Nin, Yuet and C Kwan's master. He passes away in episode 9 while betting with Ying Wut-zeok to accept Ho Nin, Ho Yuet and C Kwan.
- William Fung as Tsui Lung-chu, Ying Wut-zeok's drinking companion and friend. Died in episode 32.
- Tai Yiu Ming as Gǔ-lù(古祿), CID Inspector. Colleague and friend of Mung and C Kwan.

=== Vampires ===
- Joel Chan as Ling Fung (凌風); Sheldon, one of two the first-generation vampires from the year 2115. Age : 535 years old

He is given the instruction by Dr. Tayor to assist Amelia ( Lam Mung-Nam ) in retrieving a large amount of BR48 component from the past for the developing the vampire contagious virus cure (antiviral medicine) . He is bitten by Amelia whilst travelling in the time space wormhole through a space ship and becomes a super vampire. After that the space ship encounter a space-time storm causing it to wreck in the past leading him and Amelia to both land in the wrong time period with amnesia. He regain his lost memories after drinking Lam Mung-Nam's blood and decide to abandon his mission to go back to the future with BR48 substance. He enjoy being a vampire and tries to stop Lam Mung-Nam from back to future with the BR48 substance and he was Killed by Ying Wut-zeok during final battle in episode 33. Arch-nemesis of Ying Wut-zeok and Lam Mung-Nam.

- Hubert Wu as Pong Kit (龐杰), son of Pong Ying-tin, has the vampire ability to stop time for a short period. who he was indirectly transform to a vampire by his father in order to save his life from terminal illness during the Ming dynasty. He is a fan of Ho Nin's Martial art Novels and they become friends. He dies to find peace in episode 29. Age : 529 yrs old
- Jeannie Chan as Yuen Bing (阮冰), a human who turned into a vampire in order to take revenge on a man that hates girls. Killed by Ling Fung in episode 32. Age : 70-year-old
- Vincent Wai Lam as Ngok Yat-ming, a blind vampire. He was an ordinary blind human who turned into vampire in order to take revenge on Ying Wut-zeok 200 years ago. He accepts a challenge from Pong Ying-tin and kills him in episode 31 after Ying Wut-zeok loses in power. Killed by Pong Ying-tin's assistant in episode 32. Age : 250 years old

=== Undead-Humans ===
- Eddie Kwan as Pong Ying-tin (龐應天), father of Pong Kit. Former leader of the Kam-Yi-Wai. Chairman of the Kam-Tin Medical Factory corporation. For the last five hundred years he secretly has been try to develop a cure for Vampirism behind his comrades' back. He want to develop a cure in order for his son Pong Kit ( who he indirectly transform to a vampire in order to save his life from terminal illness during the Ming dynasty) to be human again. He is killed by the blinded vampire (Yat-ming) who he tries to slay to protect his friend, Ying Wut-zeok for redemption of bad deeds he has done that harm his comrades because of protecting vampire son in episode 31.

=== Guest appearance ===
- Chloe Nguyen as Lee Sze Ya / Xenia, A mysterious blond hair woman that resides in Netherlands. Ten years before, She given Lam Mung-Nam a temporary cure for to suppressed her vampire powers.
- Lo Mang as Chan Tai-ping, Kam Kin's martial art rival, revealed to become a vampire by Ying Wut-zeok and killed by a vampire in episode 9
- Ho Ying Sin as participant of the Ground Boxing Competition.
- James Ng as Ah Fu, Late My Night customer
- Stephanie Ho as Ding Heung (丁香), a qing dynasty, Chinese vampire. Sister of Ding Lik (Guest Appearance in episode 27)
- Alan Wan as Ding Lik (丁力), a qing dynasty, Chinese vampire. Brother of Ding Heung (Guest Appearance in episode 26 and 27)
- Anders Nelsson as Dr. Taylor, a scientist from the year 2115. Supervisor of Amelia and Sheldon who send them on a time travel mission back to five hundred years to gather a main component for the vampire contagious virus cure (antiviral medicine) known as BR48 which is currently extinct in the year 2115.(Guest Appearance in episode 33)

== Original soundtrack ==
Blue Veins Original Soundtrack

Soundtrack album by Various Artists
- Genre: Pop, soundtrack

Track listing
No.	Title	Artist	Length
1.	"All Gods Confusion (諸神混亂)" (Opening & Ending 1)	Kay Tse (謝安琪)	4:18
2.	"Heaven and Earth (天地不容)" (Ending 2)	Hubert Wu (胡鴻鈞)	3.15
3.	"The Only One"	Stephanie Ho (何雁詩)	3.05

== Viewership ratings ==
Timeslot (HKT)	#	Day(s)	Week	Episode(s)	Average points	Peaking points
Mon - Sun (9:30-10:30 pm); 21:30–22:30	1	Mon - Fri	11 - 15 Apr 2016	1 — 5	23	26
Mon - Sun (9:30-10:30 pm); 21:30–22:30	2	Mon - Fri	18 - 22 Apr 2016	6 — 10	22.6	24
Mon - Sun (9:30-10:30 pm); 21:30–22:30	2	Sat	23 Apr 2016	11	18.6	--
Mon - Sun (9:30-10:30 pm); 21:30–22:30	2	Sun	24 Apr 2016	12	19.5	--
Mon - Sun (9:30-10:30 pm); 21:30–22:30	3	Mon - Fri	24 - 29 Apr 2016	13 — 17	23.3	27
Mon - Sun (9:30-10:30 pm); 21:30–22:30	3	Sat	30 Apr 2016	18	17.2	--
Mon - Sun (9:30-10:30 pm); 21:30–22:30	3	Sun	1 May 2016	19	17.7	--
Mon - Sun (9:30-10:30 pm); 21:30–22:30	4	Mon - Fri	02 - 6 May 2016	20 — 24	23.8	27
Mon - Sun (9:30-10:30 pm); 21:30–22:30	4	Sat	7 May 2016	25		
Mon - Sun (9:30-10:30 pm); 21:30–22:30	4	Sun	8 May 2016	26		
Mon - Sun (9:30-10:30 pm); 21:30–22:30	5	Mon - Fri	09 - 13 May 2016	27 — 31		
Mon - Sun (9:30-10:30 pm); 21:30–22:30	5	Sat	14 May 2016	32		
Mon - Sun (9:30-10:30 pm); 21:30–22:30	5	Sun	15 May 2016	33		
Total average						

== International broadcast ==
- Malaysia - 8TV - On weekends from 7:00pm to 8:00pm starting June 9, 2018 - September 29, 2018
- Singapore - Mediacorp Channel U

== See also ==
- List of vampire television series
