= Dead Wrong (TV series) =

2016 Hong Kong television drama

- Official poster
- 致命復活
- Genre: Drama; Suspense
- Created by: Lam Chi-wah
- Written by: Ng Siu-tung
- Starring: Roger Kwok; Joey Meng; Kenny Wong; Vincent Wong; Rebecca Zhu; Stephanie Ho; Zoie Tam
- Theme music composer: Dominic Chu
- Opening theme: "Cannot Be Told" (不可告人) by Vincent Wong
- Ending theme: "Love Takes Courage" (愛需要勇氣) by Stephanie Ho
- Country of origin: Hong Kong
- Original language: Cantonese
- No. of episodes: 28

Production
- Producer: Lam Chi-wah
- Production locations: Hong Kong; Ho Chi Minh City; Da Lat; Ha Long Bay
- Running time: 45 minutes
- Production company: TVB

Original release
- Network: TVB Jade
- Release: 20 November – 17 December 2016

Related
- My Lover From the Planet Meow; No Reserve

Dead Wrong
- Chinese: 致命復活
- Cantonese Yale: ji mihng fuhk wuht
- Literal meaning: "fatal resurrection"
Transcriptions
Standard Mandarin
- Hanyu Pinyin: Zhìmìng Fùhuó
- Bopomofo: ㄓˋㄇㄧㄥˋㄈㄨˋㄏㄨㄛˊ
Yue: Cantonese
- Yale Romanization: ji mihng fuhk wuht
- Jyutping: zi3 ming6 fuk6 wut6
- IPA: [tsīː.mèŋ fòk̚.wùːt̚]

Dead Wrong (Chinese: 致命復活; Cantonese Yale: ji mihng fuhk wuht; literally "Fatal Resurrection") is a 2016 Hong Kong television drama produced by Lam Chi-wah and TVB. It stars Roger Kwok as Vincent Wai, a man who was abducted and imprisoned on a deserted island for ten years. After being rescued, he struggles to adjust to his new life, but soon learns that there was more to his abduction than it meets the eye. He sets out on a path of vengeance, with devastating consequences.

Dead Wrong premiered with two back-to-back episodes on TVB Jade in Hong Kong and Astro On Demand in Malaysia on 20 November 2016. It was one of three TVB television dramas used to welcome the broadcaster's 49th anniversary. The final episode aired on 17 December 2016.

== Plot ==
During a business trip to Vietnam in 2006, Hong Kong business consultant Vincent Wai and his team get abducted by a local Vietnamese crime gang, who attempt to ransom them for money. Vincent's assistant, Max Hong, manages to escape their captors, but Vincent is taken to an uninhabited island off the shore of Ho Chi Minh City, where he is locked in a prison. Most of the gang members die in a shootout with the police, and the line of evidence leading to Vincent's whereabouts are wiped clean. After being missing for ten years, the Hong Kong Court declares Vincent legally dead.

Ten years later in 2016, a battered and malnourished Vincent escapes his prison and is rescued by a Vietnamese fisherman. He returns to Hong Kong to reunite with his family, but learns that his declared death had lost him his identity and assets. His wife Cathy is also already remarried to their friend Yan, a private investigator. With nothing more left to hold on to, Vincent returns to his old firm, where he is warmly received. With the help of his former assistant Max and his superior Queenie Yip, Vincent rebuilds his business consulting empire.

As Vincent struggles to adjust to his new life, he learns that his abduction ten years previously had far broader implications than just a scuffle with some gang members. Some of his friends, including his closest family, were involved. Vincent finds himself embarking on a journey of revenge, with deadly consequences.

== Cast and characters ==
=== Main ===
- Roger Kwok as Vincent Wai Yat-sing (韋逸昇; wai4 jat6 sing1), the series' central character, a talented Hong Kong business consultant who was abducted and imprisoned on a deserted island off the coast of Vietnam for ten years. After he escapes and is rescued, Vincent returns to Hong Kong in hopes to reunite with his family, only to find it impossible to return to his old life. Intelligent and assiduous, Vincent rebuilds his business empire at Outstanding Consulting Group and attempts to restart his life with new purpose, but suffers the psychological repercussions of his imprisonment. Upon discovering that his abduction had far broader implications than just a scuffle with some gang members, Vincent sets on getting revenge on those who are responsible, winning back the ten years he had lost.
- Joey Meng as Cathy Yuen Kiu (阮喬; jyun2 kiu4), a solicitor. She is introduced at the start of the series as Vincent's wife, and they have one 4-year-old son Chi-chung, who is autistic. In the first few years of Vincent's disappearance, Cathy visited Vietnam every year to search for his whereabouts, but to no avail. She finally gives up her search on the seventh year, and applies for his death certificate. Cathy was an orphan, and spent most of her early years in an orphanage in Vietnam with her childhood friend, Yan. She later falls in love with Yan and marries him, a year before Vincent is rescued.
- Kenny Wong as Lam Ho-yan (林浩仁; lam4 hou6 jan4), Cathy's husband. He is a private investigator and a former mercenary. Yan grew up in an orphanage with Cathy, and had protected her from afar ever since. Yan is an amputee, sporting a prosthetic left leg. He was shot in the knee while trying to save Cathy from Vincent's captors. During Vincent's disappearance, Yan frequently accompanied Cathy to Vietnam to search for him. Touched by Yan's sincerity and love, Cathy reciprocates Yan's love for her and marries him on the ninth year of Vincent's disappearance.
- Vincent Wong as Max Hong Sing-chit (康成哲; hong1 sing4 zit3), Vincent's apprentice, who was abducted alongside Vincent during their business trip to Vietnam ten years ago. Max barely escapes imprisonment thanks to Vincent's help, but is unable to save Vincent in the end. Max suffers posttraumatic stress disorder from his traumatic experience, and develops a sensation seeking personality as a result.
- Rebecca Zhu as Queenie Yip Chau (葉秋; jip6 cau1), Vincent's boss at Outstanding. Her deceased older sister was Ivy Yip, Vincent's former assistant. Queenie admires Vincent's perseverance, and is attracted to him.
- Stephanie Ho as Tracy Lam Tsui-yee (林翠宜; lam4 ceoi3 ji4), Yan's younger cousin. She is a recent college graduate, and majored in archeology. She becomes involved in Vincent's case during a trip to Vietnam.
- Zoie Tam as Emma Kwok Cheuk-sze (郭卓詩; gwok3 ceok3 si1), Max's talented but arrogant subordinate at Outstanding.

=== Vincent's colleagues ===
- Tyson Chak as West Ling Chak-sai (凌澤西; ling4 zaak6 sai1), Vincent and Max's loyal friend, who works at Outstanding as an assistant manager.
- KK Cheung as C.K. Kwan Si-kit (關士杰; gwaan1 si6 git6), Vincent and Max's boss, and the owner of Outstanding.
- Toby Chan as Ivy Yip Ching (葉青; jip6 cing1), Vincent's former assistant, who was abducted alongside him during their business trip to Vietnam. Ivy was raped and killed by their captors. She was attracted to Vincent, and they had a one-time illicit affair. Ivy was Queenie's older sister.

=== Vincent's family ===
- Jerry Ku as Wai Yat-lung (韋逸隆; wai6 yat6 lung4), Vincent's older brother. He is a rather incapable businessman, and had to rely on his brother's money to sustain his businesses.
- Alice Fung So-bor as Lai Wai-hing (賴惠卿; laai6 wai6 hing1), Vincent and Lung's mother.
- Fanny Lee as Chau Sui-ngor (周瑞娥; zau1 seoi6 ngo4), Lung's greedy and money-minded wife.
- Cadmus Chan as Wai Chi-chung (韋子聰; wai6 zi2 cung1), Vincent and Cathy's autistic teenage son.

=== Other ===
- Stephen Wong as Calvin Hong Sing-yin (康成賢; hong1 sing4 jin4), Max's estranged younger brother.
- Yu Yang as Hong Man-hon (康文瀚; hong1 man4 hon6), Max's father, the wealthy owner of a large business conglomerate.
- Susan Tse as Ma Wai-kei (馬慧琪; maa5 wai6 kei4), Max's mother.
- Yue Chi-ming as Mau Hok-yu (茅學儒; maau4 hok6 jyu4), Cathy's mentor.
- Eileen Yeow as Ho Wing-yin (何穎妍; ho4 wing6 jin4), Cathy's colleague.
- Koo Koon-chung as Detective Lai Ka-ming (黎嘉銘; lai4 gaa1 ming4), the detective inspector in charge of Vincent's missing case in Vietnam.
- Yao Bing as Detective Poon Yu-chung (潘如松; pun1 jyu4 cung4), Lai's subordinate.
- Savio Tsang as Mo Tsan-nam (武振南; mou5 zan3 naam4), known as Brother Lam, the leader of the Vietnamese gang which orchestrated Vincent's abduction.
- Ho Chun-hin as Mok Hung-wah (莫鴻華), who was part of Brother Lam's gang.
- Steve Lee as Hung Kwan (洪坤; hung4 kwan1), known as Master Hung, the dragon leader of a Vietnamese crime gang.
- Oscar Li as Crazy Keung (傻強), Vincent's prison guard in the island, who is mentally disabled.

== Development ==
- The costume fitting ceremony was held together on December 21, 2015 at 12:30 pm Tseung Kwan O TVB City Studio One Common Room.

== Viewership ratings ==
The following is a table that includes a list of the total ratings points based on television viewership. "Viewers in millions" refers to the number of people, derived from TVB Jade ratings, in Hong Kong who watched the episode live.

#	Timeslot (HKT)	Air date(s)	Episode(s)	Avg.	Peak	HK Viewers (in millions)	Ref.
1	Sun, 9: 30 pm	20 November 2016	1 — 2	21.1	24	1.36	
1	Mon – Fri, 9:30 pm	21 – 25 November 2016	3 — 7	22.9	24	1.48	
1	Sun, 9:30 pm	27 November 2016	8	—	24	—	
2	Mon – Fri, 9:30 pm	28 November – 2 December 2016	9 — 13	22.7	25	1.47	
2	Sun, 9:30 pm	4 December 2016	14	21	25	1.36	
3	Mon – Fri, 9:30 pm	5 – 9 December 2016	15 — 19	23.4	26	1.51	
3	Sat, 9:30 pm	10 December 2016	20	—	26	—	
3	Sun, 9:30 pm	11 December 2016	21	—	26	—	
4	Mon – Fri, 9:30 pm	12 – 16 December 2016	22 — 26	22	—	1.42	
4	Sat, 9:30 pm	17 December 2016	27 — 28	20.8	—	1.35	
Total average				22	26	1.43	
