= Rebecca Zhu =

Hong Kong actress (born 1987)

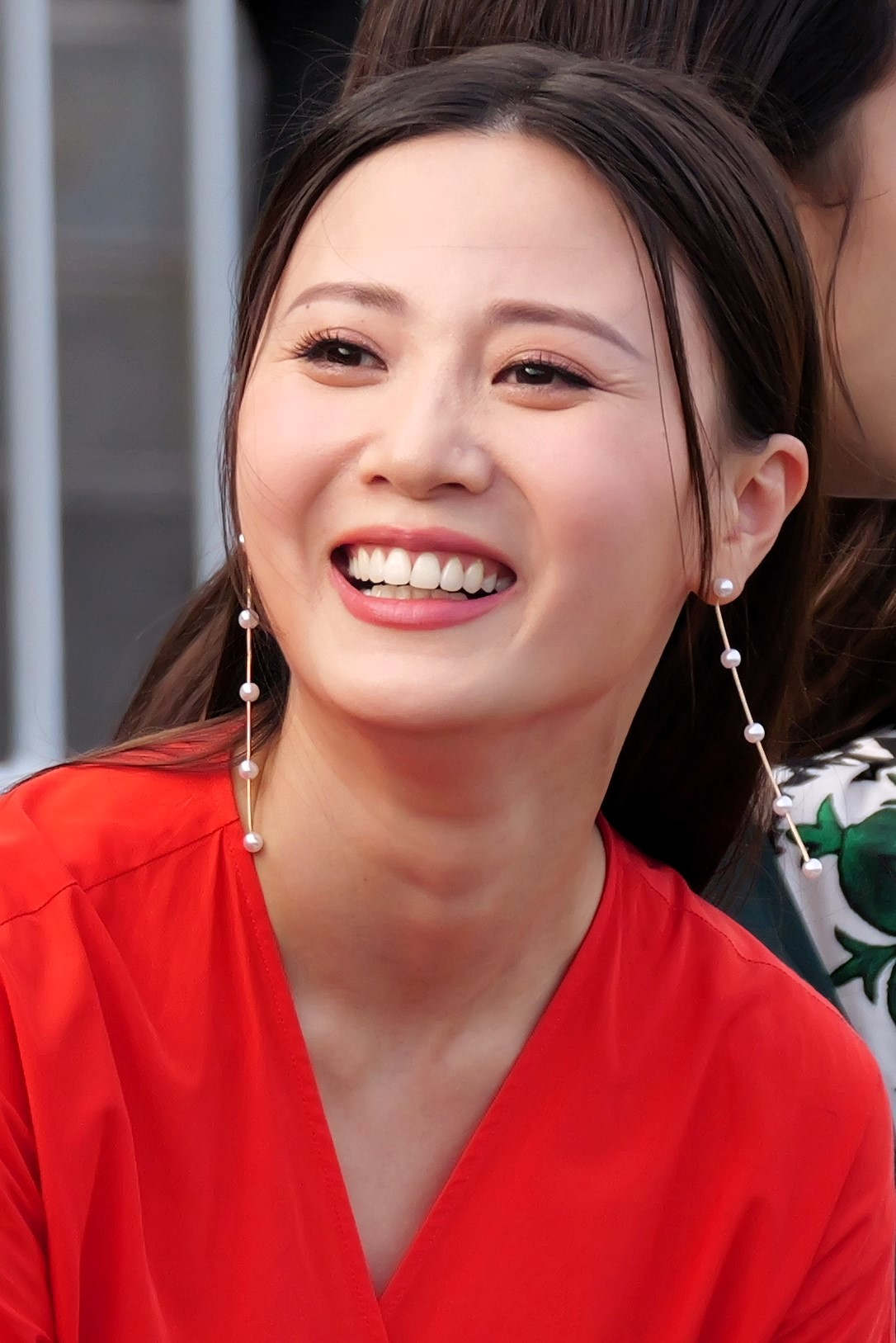
- Zhu in 2024
- Born: 2 December 1987 (age 38); Suzhou, Jiangsu, China
- Education: Hong Kong Academy for Performing Arts
- Occupation: Actress
- Years active: 2011–present
- Awards: Miss Hong Kong 2011 – Miss Hong Kong TVB Anniversary Awards – Best Supporting Actress; 2017 A General, a Scholar and a Eunuch

Chinese name
- Traditional Chinese: 朱晨麗
- Simplified Chinese: 朱晨丽
Transcriptions
Standard Mandarin
- Hanyu Pinyin: Zhū Chénlì
Yue: Cantonese
- Jyutping: Zyu1 San4 Lai6

Rebecca Zhu (Chinese: 朱晨麗; born 2 December 1987) is a Hong Kong actress and a beauty pageant titleholder who was crowned Miss Hong Kong 2011. As a result of her pageant win, Zhu was offered a starring role in the 2012 TVB television drama Silver Spoon, Sterling Shackles, which was also her acting debut.

== Early life ==
Zhu was born in Suzhou, Jiangsu, China. Following her mother's wishes, Zhu started dancing lessons as early as the age of 3, taking Latin dance and Chinese dance courses. When she was 10, Zhu moved to Shanghai after earning the opportunity to perform for a ballet dance troupe there. At age 16, Zhu was accepted by the Hong Kong Academy for Performing Arts and moved to Hong Kong, where she continued to study ballet. Zhu earned full scholarship to study abroad at the John F. Kennedy Center for the Performing Arts in Washington, D.C. Upon graduation, Zhu became a member of The Hong Kong Ballet Company.

== Career ==
=== Pageant debut ===
In 2011, Zhu entered the Miss Hong Kong pageant as contestant #5, a local delegate. Zhu stayed as one of the most popular contestants throughout the competition. She eventually won the title, also winning Miss Trendy Vision, Happiness Ambassador, and the Most Popular Award. Zhu then went on to compete in the Miss Chinese International Pageant the following year. Although she failed to get placed in the pageant, she won the Greater China Elegance Award.

=== Acting career ===
In November 2011, Zhu was cast in the TVB blockbuster drama Silver Spoon, Sterling Shackles, which also became Zhu's acting debut. The role was originally meant for Fala Chen, who turned down the offer last-minute for health reasons. The drama's producer stated that Zhu's resemblance to Chen was one of the reasons why he decided to replace her with Zhu. The drama aired in 2012. Zhu's first performance was not well-received, which many critics reasoned was because of the language barrier (Zhu's native tongue is Mandarin Chinese), as well as her lack of acting experience prior to taking on the role.

Zhu pursued supporting roles for the next few years. Her performances in 2013 dramas Triumph in the Skies II and Always and Ever earned her nominations for Most Promising Female Artiste and Favourite Supporting Actress at the 2013 TVB Star Awards Malaysia, which were her first acting nominations.

In 2017, Zhu won the Best Supporting Actress award at the 2017 TVB Anniversary Awards with her role in the drama A General, a Scholar, and a Eunuch. However, this stirred up controversies among audience and netizens. In 2018, she played her first female leading role in the drama The Stunt. With her role in the drama Fist Fight, Zhu garnered her first Best Actress nomination at the 2018 TVB Anniversary Awards.

Zhu is good friends with Wonder Women co-actresses Miriam Yeung and Alice Chan.

== Filmography ==
=== Television dramas (TVB) ===
Year	Title	Role	Notes
2012	Silver Spoon, Sterling Shackles	Kwai Siu-yau	Major Supporting Role
2013	Triumph in the Skies II	"Pink Pink" Wu Pink / King Lok-to	Supporting Role
2013	Always and Ever	Lam Yim-fong	Supporting Role
2014	Officer Geomancer	Tit Leung-chi	Major Supporting Role
2015	Smooth Talker	Lily Kau	Ep. 7
2015	The Fixer	Chiu Dan-ching (Madam Chiu)	Major Supporting Role
2016	Over Run Over	Fung Tsz-ching	Major Supporting Role
2016	The Last Healer in Forbidden City	Consort Zhen	Major Supporting Role
2016	Dead Wrong	Queenie Yip Chau	Major Supporting Role
2017	Recipes to Live By	Tai-ng Yuen	Major Supporting Role
2017	A General, a Scholar, and a Eunuch	"Cat" Catherine Fong Wai-ling	Major Supporting Role; TVB Star Awards Malaysia for Top 17 Favourite TVB Drama Characters; TVB Anniversary Award for Best Supporting Actress
2018	The Forgotten Valley	Ku Man-yi	Main Role
2018	Stealing Seconds	Haley Mok Hei-lin	Main Role
2018	The Stunt	May Sheung Mei-chu	Main Role
2018	Fist Fight	Young Ching-ching (Madam Young)	Main Role
2019	Wonder Women	Ma Sze-lui	Main Role
2020	The Dripping Sauce	Ha Siu-moon / Man Ching-man	Main Role
2020	Forensic Heroes IV	Ko Ching	Main Role
2022	The Beauty of War	Tong Yan	Major Supporting Role
2022	Go with the Float	Yuki Lee Yim-yu	Major Supporting Role
2024	No Room for Crime	Pang Wing Kei	Major Supporting Role

=== Television dramas (Shaw Brothers Studio) ===
Year	Title	Role	Notes
2021	Flying Tiger 3	Natalie Chin Man-li	Guest Appearance

=== Film ===
Year	Title	Role	Notes/Ref.
2011	Turning Point 2	Choi Mei-suet (Miss Choi)	Cameo
2012	Give Me 1 Minute to Say I Love You	Rebecca	Cameo
2013	Laughing Every Day	Lai-lai	Cameo
2015	From Vegas to Macau II	Siu-yu	
2015	Knock Knock Who's There?	NiKi	
2016	Line Walker	Samantha	
2022	New Kung Fu Cult Master 1	Yin Susu	
2022	New Kung Fu Cult Master 2	Yin Susu	
2022	焚情	Lau Ching	
2024	Peg O' My Heart	Donna	

== Awards and nominations ==
Year	Association	Category	Nominated work	Result
2013	TVB Star Awards Malaysia	Favourite TVB Promising Female Artiste	Triumph in the Skies II and Always and Ever	Nominated
2013	TVB Star Awards Malaysia	Favourite TVB Supporting Actress	Always and Ever	Nominated
2015	TVB Star Awards Malaysia	Top 16 Favourite TVB Drama Characters	The Fixer	Nominated
2015	TVB Anniversary Awards	Most Improved Female Artiste	Officer Geomancer, Smooth Talker, and The Fixer	Nominated
2016	TVB Anniversary Awards	Best Supporting Actress	Dead Wrong	Nominated
2017	StarHub TVB Awards	My Favourite TVB Supporting Actress	A General, a Scholar, and a Eunuch	Nominated
2017	StarHub TVB Awards	My Favourite TVB Female TV Characters	A General, a Scholar, and a Eunuch	Nominated
2017	StarHub TVB Awards	My Favourite TVB On-Screen Couple (with Matthew Ho)	A General, a Scholar, and a Eunuch	Nominated
2017	TVB Star Awards Malaysia	Favourite TVB Supporting Actress	A General, a Scholar, and a Eunuch	Nominated
2017	TVB Star Awards Malaysia	Top 17 Favourite TVB Drama Characters	A General, a Scholar, and a Eunuch	Won
2017	TVB Anniversary Awards	Best Supporting Actress	A General, a Scholar, and a Eunuch	Won
2017	TVB Anniversary Awards	Most Improved Female Artiste	Recipes to Live By and A General, a Scholar, and a Eunuch	Nominated
2019	TVB Anniversary Awards	Best Actress	Wonder Women	Nominated
2019	TVB Anniversary Awards	The Most Popular Female Character	Wonder Women	Nominated
2020	TVB Anniversary Awards	Best Actress	The Dripping Sauce	Nominated
2020	TVB Anniversary Awards	The Most Popular Female Character	The Dripping Sauce	Nominated
2022	TVB Anniversary Awards	Best Actress	The War of Beauties	Nominated
2022	TVB Anniversary Awards	The Most Popular Female Character	The War of Beauties	Nominated
2022	TVB Anniversary Awards	The Most Popular Female Character	Go With The Float	Nominated
2022	TVB Anniversary Awards	Best Supporting Actress	Go With The Float	Nominated
2022	TVB Anniversary Awards	Favourite TVB Actress in Malaysia	The War of Beauties	Nominated

Awards and achievements
Preceded by Toby Chan	Miss Hong Kong; 2011	Succeeded by Carat Cheung
