= Tiger Cubs (TV series) =

Hong Kong television series

- Also known as: Special Duties Unit; The One
- Genre: Police procedural; Action; Drama
- Created by: Lam Chi-wah
- Written by: Leung Yan-tung; Ng Lap-kwong; and others
- Directed by: Wong Kwok-fai; Hung Kam-fat; Chan San-hap; Lee Shu-fong
- Starring: Joe Ma; Jessica Hsuan; Him Law; Oscar Leung; Vincent Wong; Mandy Wong; Benjamin Yuen; William Chak
- Theme music composer: Tige Hui
- Opening theme: "身邊的依據" ("Surrounding Basis") by Joe Ma
- Country of origin: Hong Kong
- Original language: Cantonese
- No. of episodes: 13

Production
- Executive producer: Lam Chi-wah
- Camera setup: Single camera
- Running time: 90 minutes
- Production company: TVB

Original release
- Network: TVB Jade; HD Jade
- Release: 24 June – 12 August 2012

Related
- Tiger Cubs II (2014); Flying Tiger (2018); Flying Tiger 2 (2019)

Tiger Cubs
- Traditional Chinese: 飛虎
- Simplified Chinese: 飞虎
- Literal meaning: "flying tiger"
Transcriptions
Standard Mandarin
- Hanyu Pinyin: Fēi Hǔ
Yue: Cantonese
- Yale Romanization: Fei1 Fu2
- Jyutping: Fei1 Fu2

Tiger Cubs (Chinese: 飛虎; literally "Flying Tigers"), alternatively titled Special Duties Unit, is a Hong Kong police procedural television series produced by Lam Chi-wah and TVB. It stars Joe Ma, Jessica Hsuan, Him Law, Oscar Leung, Vincent Wong, Mandy Wong, Benjamin Yuen and William Chak as castmembers of the first installment. It premiered on Sunday, 24 June 2012 on Jade and HD Jade, and was the first TVB drama to be broadcast in the Sunday night time slot since 1995's File of Justice. Tiger Cubs was one of six TVB dramas that were promoted at the 2011 Hong Kong Internal Film and TV Market. Tiger Cubs debuted its trailer at TVB's Programme Presentation 2012 event on 1 November 2011.

The drama was renewed for a sequel in early 2013 for ten episodes. Tiger Cubs II premiered on 19 October 2014.

== Premise ==
The drama follows a fictional team of elite paramilitary officers from the Special Duties Unit of the Hong Kong police force. They specialise in counter-terrorism, hostage rescue, and crimes that are deemed too dangerous for regular police to handle. The unit works closely with the Organised Crime and Triad Bureau (OCTB) to crack down on terrorist groups.

== Production ==
Written by Lee Yee-wah, Tiger Cubs began pre-production with the backing of the Hong Kong Police Force, which supported the drama with their newest SDU equipment. With a budget of over HK$15 million, each episode took HK$1 million to make, three times more expensive than an average TVB drama production. On 3 January 2011, it was announced that Joe Ma, a former VIPPU officer, and Jessica Hsuan had been cast in the lead roles. On 5 January, a press conference and costume fitting was held at TVB City, Tseung Kwan O. Filming commenced on 20 January and ended in April, taking four months to complete. To keep up with the demanding and flexible physical requirements of the drama, most of the main cast members consistently underwent special training between filming schedules. Him Law, who portrays SDU A-Team officer Yue Hok-lai, reported that he lost about 10 pounds after filming the first episode. On 10 February, guest star Ngo Ka-nin injured his right knee while filming a fight sequence with Dan Jun-wai, who injured his head. A TVB spokesperson later announced that they were both fine. Earlier, Savio Tsang, who portrays SDU A-Team sub leader Yip Shu-fai, was injured in the face by a plastic bullet, and Christine Kuo injured her head from a telephone booth.

=== Manila hostage crisis dramatisation ===
The production of Tiger Cubs was announced shortly after the Manila hostage crisis, causing the media to speculate if the incident had inspired the production of Tiger Cubs. Producer Lam Chi-wah denied the claims, saying that he had intentions to produce a drama about the SDU even before the crisis happened. On 30 March 2011, a tourist bus hostage scene inspired by the Manila hostage crisis was filming near Kai Tak Airport. The actors involved in the shoot admitted afterwards that they rather not have filmed it, and guest star Kenneth Ma, who portrays the hijacker, said he was afraid the scene would tarnish his public image. Nonetheless, the cast and crew "did their job" and filmed a majority of the action sequence in the first two days. On 1 April, TVB executives decided to cancel the scene, stating that the plot was too sensitive and disturbing for the Hong Kong people. They re-filmed the hostage scene from hijacking a tourist bus to hijacking a boat.

== Cast ==
=== Main characters ===
- Joe Ma as Senior Inspector Chin Hon-to (展瀚韜), the strict head of SDU's alpha team.
- Jessica Hsuan as Senior Inspector Chong Chuk-wah (莊卓嬅), head of OCTB's A Division. She is suffering from depression due to the death of her fiancé.
- Oscar Leung as Acting Sgt. Chong Chuk-yuen (莊卓源), alpha team's most experienced sniper and Wah's younger brother.
- Him Law as Acting Sgt. Yu Hok-lai (俞學禮), a new member to SDU's alpha team who eventually becomes one of the team's main front line assaulters. Lai's overconfident and cocky attitude rises from his attempt to not fall victim to stereotypes due to his wealthy family background. Yuen is the only member of the team who calls Lai "Bob Jai" (Bob仔; literally "Kid Bob").
- Vincent Wong as Acting Sgt. Yau Chun-hin (邱駿軒), also a new member to SDU's alpha team and Lai's best friend. Hin's calm and patient personality eventually has him become one of the best snipers in the team. However, Hin lacks self-esteem, and is presented as a foil to Lai's bold and fearless character.
- Mandy Wong as Probationary Inspector So Man-keung (蘇文強), alpha team's only female member and one of the main technicians for the team's administrative support. Keung suffers from acrophobia, which consistently impedes her from passing the SDU operation team exams.
- William Chak as Acting Sgt. Cheung Kai-kwong (張繼光), one of alpha team's physically strongest members, but originally joined the unit so he can earn fast money to open his own fitness center.
- Benjamin Yuen as Acting Sgt. Tse Kar-sing (謝家星), one of alpha team's main assaulters.

=== Supporting characters ===
- Wu Kwing-lung as Bitch / Acting Sgt. Hui Chi-yan (許志仁), an A Team sniper.
- Oscar Li as Ringmaster / Acting Sgt. Kwok Yiu-cho (郭耀祖), A Team's current leading front line assaulter.
- Savio Tsang as Mother / Station Sergeant Yip Shu-fai (葉樹輝), A Team's sub-leader.
- Raymond Tsang as Dragon Lady / Acting Sgt. Lung Kim-fai (龍劍飛), an A Team assaulter and is the team's oldest member.
- Patrick Tang as Sergeant Ben Fong Wing-chaam (方永杉), a member of Wah's OCTB team.
- Kayi Cheung as Constable May Fung Ka-mei (馮嘉美), a member of Wah's OCTB team.
- Tong Chun-ming as Constable Lam Kwan (林坤), a member of Wah's OCTB team.
- Jason Lam as Constable Law Siu-bor (羅小波), a member of Wah's OCTB team.
- Christine Kuo as Ting Wai-wai (丁慧慧), a flight attendant and Yuen's love interest.

=== Special Duties Unit (SDU) ===
| Character | Actor | Description |
|---|---|---|
| SP Leung Yat-fung (梁日鋒) | Dominic Lam | SDU commander |
| SIP Chin Hon-to (展瀚韜) | Joe Ma | A Team leader |
| SSGT Yip Shu-fai (葉樹輝) | Savio Tsang | A Team sub-leader |
| WPI So Man-keung (蘇文強) | Mandy Wong | A Team administrative support technician |
| ASGT Chong Chuk-yuen (莊卓源) | Oscar Leung | A Team sniper leader |
| ASGT Hui Chi-yan (許志仁) | Wu Kwing-lung | A Team sniper |
| ASGT Yau Chun-hin (邱駿軒) | Vincent Wong | A Team sniper |
| ASGT Cheung Kai-kwong (張繼光) | William Chak | A Team assaulter |
| ASGT Tse Kar-sing (謝家星) | Benjamin Yuen | A Team assaulter |
| ASGT Kwok Yiu-cho (郭耀祖) | Oscar Li | A Team assaulter |
| ASGT Lung Kim-fai (龍劍飛) | Raymond Tsang | A Team Assaulter |
| ASGT Yu Hok-lai (俞學禮) | Him Law | A Team assaulter |

=== Organized Crime and Triad Bureau (OCTB) ===
| Character | Actor | Occupation |
|---|---|---|
| WSIP Chong Chuk-wah (莊卓嬅) | Jessica Hsuan | Team inspector |
| SGT Ben Fong (方永杉) | Patrick Tang | Team sergeant |
| WPC May Fung (馮嘉美) | Kayi Cheung | Team constable |
| PC Lam Kwan (林坤) | Tong Chun-ming | Team constable |
| PC Law Siu-bor (羅小波) | Jason Lam | Team constable |

== Reception ==
=== Critical reception ===
The critical reception of Tiger Cubs has been generally positive. On Douban, the first series received a rating of 7.8 out of 10 based on over eleven thousand votes. Based on 87 reviews from Mtime, the first series received an overall rating of 7.5, with the critical consensus "it's worth to take a look."

=== Ratings ===
The following is a table that includes a list of the total ratings points based on television viewership. Tiger Cubs will be aired every Sunday for episode 1 - 3 and then twice a week on Saturday and Sunday afterwards.

| Week | Originally aired | Episodes | Average points | Peaking points | Reference |
|---|---|---|---|---|---|
| 1 | 24 June 2012 | 1 | 29 | 30 | |
| 2 | 1 July 2012 | 2 | 28 | — | |
| 3 | 8 July 2012 | 3 | 30 | — | |
| 4 | 14 July 2012 | 4 | 32 | — | |
| 5 | 15 July 2012 | 5 | 31 | — | |
| 6 | 21 July 2012 | 6 | 26 | — | |
| 7 | 22 July 2012 | 7 | 31 | — | |
| 8 | 28 July 2012 | 8 | 25 | — | |
| 9 | 29 July 2012 | 9 | 29 | — | |
| 10 | 4 August 2012 | 10 | 23 | — | |
| 11 | 5 August 2012 | 11 | 26 | — | |
| 12 | 11 August 2012 | 12 | 25 | — | |
| 13 | 12 August 2012 | 13 | 30 | 36 | |

== Episode list ==
| Week | # | Title | Directed by | Written by | Original release date | HK viewers (millions) | Rating |
|---|---|---|---|---|---|---|---|
| 1 | 1 | "Here Comes the King of Thieves (Part I)" | - | - | 24 June 2012 | 1.86 | 29 |
| 2 | 2 | "Here Comes the King of Thieves (Part II)" | - | - | 1 July 2012 | 1.80 | 28 |
| 3 | 3 | "Lai's Father Kidnapping Case" | - | - | 8 July 2012 | 1.93 | 30 |
| 4 | 4 | "The Cop Who Stole a Gun" | - | - | 14 July 2012 | 1.67 | 26 |
| 4 | 5 | "Cracking the Drug Den" | - | - | 15 July 2012 | 1.99 | 31 |
| 5 | 6 | "Attacking the Fruit Market" | - | - | 21 July 2012 | 1.67 | 26 |
| 5 | 7 | "Young Criminal" | - | - | 22 July 2012 | 1.99 | 31 |
| 6 | 8 | "The 2G Kidnapping Case" | - | - | 28 July 2012 | 1.73 | 27 |
| 6 | 9 | "Army Obsession" | - | - | 29 July 2012 | 1.86 | 29 |
| 7 | 10 | "Flying Tiger, Loving Father, Husband" | - | - | 4 August 2012 | 1.73 | 27 |
| 7 | 11 | "I Want to be a Cop" | - | - | 5 August 2012 | 1.67 | 26 |
| 8 | 12 | "Bomber" | - | - | 11 August 2012 | 1.80 | 28 |
| 8 | 13 | "Finale" | - | - | 12 August 2012 | 1.93 | 30 |

== See also ==
- Special Duties Unit
