= Grace Chan =

Hong Kong actress

- 陳凱琳
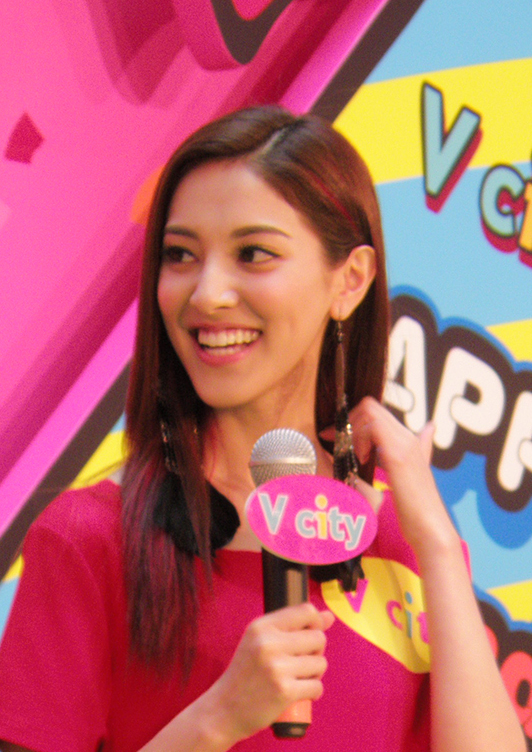
- Chan in 2015
- Born: British Hong Kong
- Education: Simon Fraser University Department of Communication
- Occupations: Actress; television host
- Years active: 2013–present
- Spouse: Kevin Cheng (m. 2018)
- Children: 3
- Awards: Miss Hong Kong 2013, Tourism Ambassador, Most Popular among Media & Most Popular Pageant on Scene Miss Chinese International 2014 TVB Anniversary Awards – Most Improved Female Artiste; 2015 Raising the Bar, Captain of Destiny StarHub TVB Awards – Best New TVB Artiste; 2015

Chinese name
- Traditional Chinese: 陳凱琳
- Simplified Chinese: 陈凯琳
Transcriptions
Standard Mandarin
- Hanyu Pinyin: Chén Kǎilín
Yue: Cantonese
- Jyutping: Can4 Hoi2 Lam4

Grace Chan Hoi-lam is a Hong Kong–born Canadian actress, television host, and beauty pageant titleholder. She was the winner of Miss Hong Kong 2013 and Miss Chinese International 2014.

== Early life ==
Grace Chan was born in Hong Kong and immigrated to Vancouver, British Columbia with her family at the age of 5. She has a fraternal twin brother and an older sister. Through her maternal grandmother, Chan is of Malay descent. She studied for 5 years and then graduated from Simon Fraser University with a major in Communications and a minor in Publishing.

== Career ==
=== Miss Hong Kong 2013 ===
Chan was crowned Miss Hong Kong on 1 September 2013. From the beginning of the pageant, she expressed that it was her childhood dream to enter the Miss Hong Kong Pageant. As an early favourite, Chan beat the other nine contestants by gaining a majority of the 170,000 votes that were cast from the Hong Kong audience.

== Personal life ==
On 26 July 2018, Chan announced via Instagram that she was engaged to her boyfriend of three years, Hong Kong actor, Kevin Cheng. On 12 August 2018, they got married in Bali, Indonesia. In February 2019, Chan announced on Instagram that she gave birth to their first son. She gave birth to their second son in July 2020. In November 2022, she announced that she is pregnant with her third baby on her personal Instagram account. In January 2023, it was announced that she has given birth to their third son.

== Filmography ==
=== Television dramas (TVB) ===
Year	Title	Role	Notes
2014	Overachievers	Abby Chiang Lai	Supporting Role; Nominated—TVB Anniversary Award for Most Improved Female Artiste; Nominated—TVB Anniversary Award for Best Supporting Actress
2015	Raising the Bar	Giselle Tong Ching-chi	Main Role; Won—TVB Anniversary Award for Most Improved Female Artiste; Nominated—TVB Anniversary Award for Best Actress; Nominated—StarHub TVB Award for My Favourite TVB Actress; Nominated—StarHub TVB Award for My Favourite TVB Female TV Characters; Nominated—StarHub TVB Award for My Favourite Onscreen Couple (with Louis Cheung)
2015	Captain of Destiny	Wong Tai-mui	Main Role; Won—TVB Anniversary Award for Most Improved Female Artiste; Nominated—TVB Anniversary Award for Most Popular Female Character
2016	Blue Veins	Yoyo Lam Mung-yiu	Main Role; Won—TVB Star Award Malaysia for Top 15 Favourite TVB Characters; Nominated—TVB Anniversary Award for Best Actress; Nominated—StarHub TVB Award for My Favourite TVB Female Characters
2016	Brother's Keeper II	"Nana" Ko Yee-na	Main Role; Nominated—TVB Star Award Malaysia for Favourite TVB Actress; Nominated—TVB Star Award Malaysia for Favourite TVB Onscreen Couple (with Edwin Siu)
2018	My Ages Apart	Sheung Shui	Guest Appearance
2018	The Forgotten Valley	Law Kwai-sze	Main Role; Nominated—TVB Anniversary Award for Best Actress; Nominated—TVB Anniversary Award for Favourite TVB Actress in Singapore; Nominated—TVB Anniversary Award for Favourite TVB Actress in Malaysia
2018	Birth of a Hero	Sau Choi-sum	Main Role; Nominated— TVB Anniversary Award for Most Popular Female Character
2019	Justice Bao: The First Year	Fuk Lan	Guest Appearance in Ep. 16–18

=== Television dramas (Shaw Brothers Pictures) ===
Year	Title	Role	Notes
2018	Flying Tiger (飛虎之潛行極戰)	Chong Nga-shuen	Supporting Role

=== Films ===
- Laundry Shop Stars Event (2016)
- Keyboard Warriors (2018)
