= Raising the Bar (2015 TV series) =

2015 Hong Kong legal television drama

- Official poster
- Also known as: Four Girls, Three Bars; Quid Pro Quo
- 四個女仔三個BAR
- Genre: Legal drama
- Created by: Hong Kong Television Broadcasts Limited
- Written by: Lee Sai; Kuk Hin-lung; Yue Ka-koon; Chan Yuen-mei; Wong Po-yin; Yu Lau-yuen; Kwong Po-wai; Chan Cheuk-yin
- Directed by: Hui Sui-ping
- Starring: Ben Wong; Louis Cheung; Ram Chiang; Grace Chan; Elaine Yiu; Jeannie Chan; Stephanie Ho; Timothy Cheng; Moon Lau
- Opening theme: You & Me (我和你) by Stephanie Ho
- Ending theme: You Are The One (面前人) by Louis Cheung & Grace Chan
- Country of origin: Hong Kong
- Original language: Cantonese
- No. of episodes: 25

Production
- Executive producer: Catherine Tsang
- Producer: Joe Chan
- Production location: Hong Kong
- Camera setup: Multi camera
- Running time: 45 minutes
- Production company: TVB

Original release
- Network: Jade; HD Jade
- Release: 26 January – 27 February 2015

Raising the Bar
- Traditional Chinese: 四個女仔三個BAR
- Simplified Chinese: 四个女仔三个BAR
- Literal meaning: "Four Girls, Three Bars"
Transcriptions
Standard Mandarin
- Hanyu Pinyin: Sì gè nǚ zǐ sān gè BAR
Yue: Cantonese
- Jyutping: sei3 go3 neoi5 zai2 saam1 go3 BAR

Raising the Bar (Chinese: 四個女仔三個BAR; Jyutping: Sei3 Go3 Neoi5 Zai2 Saam1 Go3 BAR; literally "Four Girls, Three Bars") is a 2015 Hong Kong modern legal drama series produced by TVB. It stars Ben Wong, Louis Cheung, Ram Chiang and Grace Chan as the main leads, with Elaine Yiu, Jeannie Chan, Stephanie Ho, Timothy Cheng and Moon Lau as the major supporting cast. Natalie Tong and Elena Kong guest star this series. Filming of the series took place from June till September 2014. The series began airing 26 January 2015 and ended its run on 27 February 2015. It was broadcast on weekdays, Monday to Friday, by TVB's Jade channel in the 8:30–9:30 pm timeslot.

== Synopsis ==
A group of barristers and trainee lawyers vow to pursue justice and ideals, but the process is fraught with difficulties. Regarded as the "Condor Heroes" of the legal world, barristers Marcus Fan (Ben Wong) and his wife Vivian Cheung (Elaine Yiu) have taught many students. Among them, Giselle Tong (Grace Chan), Brittany Fok (Jeannie Chan) and Quinton Chow (Louis Cheung) are Marco's favourites. Giselle's classmate, Holly Tsang (Moon Lau), is a trainee solicitor at Vivian's law firm, while Chris Yiu (Stephanie Ho) trains under barrister Duncan Yam (Timothy Cheng). Brittany's elder half-sister, Ashley Cheng (Natalie Tong), has an affair with the married Duncan and later switches over to work for Marcus. With each of them using their own methods, how do these rookies become qualified legal practitioners, in a journey that is full of struggle, doubt and tough choices about their future? Theory turns into practice as they handle tricky cases and experience success and failures, while also dealing with love, family and friendship problems every day. Their biggest test arrives when legal standards challenge their personal orientations.

== Main cast ==
- Ben Wong (黃智賢) as Marcus Fan Chi-ngai (范智毅)
- Louis Cheung (張繼聰) as Quinton Chow Tsz-pok (周梓博)
- Ram Chiang (蔣志光) as Woody Lam Sam-muk (林森木)
- Grace Chan (陳凱琳) as Giselle Tong Ching-chi (唐靖姿)

== Guest cast ==
- Natalie Tong (唐詩詠) as Ashley Cheng Cheuk-tung (鄭妁彤)
- Elena Kong (江美儀) as Judge Amanda Lui (呂官)

== Recurring cast ==
- Elaine Yiu (姚子羚) as Vivian Cheung Wai-wan (張慧芸)
- Jeannie Chan (陳瀅) as Brittany Fok Chi-ying (霍紫凝)
- Stephanie Ho (何雁詩) as Chris Yiu Chui-fa (姚翠花)
- Timothy Cheng (鄭子誠) as Duncan Yam Suen-yip (任雋燁)
- Moon Lau (劉佩玥) as Holly Tsang Ho-yan (曾可欣)
- King Lam (林景程) as Lincoln Chai On-kui (齊安居)
- Sunny Dai (戴耀明) as Kuk Tat-kan (谷達勤)
- Andy Siu (邵卓堯) as Paul
- Matthew Ho (何廣沛) as Max Kwong
- Sam Tsang (曾航生) as Don Chu Yiu-lik (朱耀力)
- Hugo Wong (黃子恆) as Hanson Chui Yin-chit (崔賢哲)
- Alex Tsui (徐家傑) as Fok Koon-tung (霍貫東)
- Li Shing-cheong (李成昌) as Chan Keung (陳強)
- Mimi Chu (朱咪咪) as Ng Suk-fan (吳淑芬)
- Chun Wong (秦煌) as Chow Chung-cheung (周忠祥)
- Hinson Chou (周子揚) as Jaydon Ngai Chung-hang 危仲衡
- MoMo Wu (吳沚默) as Lee Dan (李丹)
- Ali Lee (李佳芯) as Shum Lai-ching (岑麗清)
- Skye Chan (陳倩揚) as Sabrina Fong Tin-na (方天娜)
- Stefan Wong (黃長興) as Kelvin
- Gary Chan (陳嘉輝) as Judge Ho (何官)
- Wendy Hon (韓毓霞) as Judge Wong (王官)
- Joseph Yeung (楊瑞麟) as Judge Chan (陳官)
- Eddie Li (李岡龍) as Judge Lai (賴官)
- Dolby Kwan (關浩揚) as Roy
- Mary Hon (韓馬利) as Holly's mother (曾可欣之媽)
- Steve Lee (李家鼎) as Holly's father (曾可欣之爸)
- Helen Ng (吳香倫) as Lam Mui (林梅)
- Johnson Law (羅莽) as Sit Kim (薛劍)
- Judy Tsang (曾敏) as Yeung Lau (楊柳)
- Snow Suen (孫慧雪) as KeiKei (淇淇)
- Suet Nei (雪妮)
- Jacquelin Chong (莊思敏) as Lawyer Yiu (姚律師)
- Jack Hui (許家傑) as Alex Lam Chin-sum (林展信)

== Alternate ending ==
An alternate ending was shown for the overseas broadcast of the drama. The scene depicts the lawyers in a silent protest in support of Hong Kong's continued judicial independence. The scene is in reference to the real life event that happened in Hong Kong during the "White Paper" protest in June 2014.

== Development ==
- Filming of the series took place from June till September 2014.
- The costume fitting ceremony was held on 7 June 2014 12:30 p.m. at Tseung Kwan O TVB City Studio One.
- The blessing ceremony was held on 26 June 2014 2:00 p.m. at Tseung Kwan O TVB City.

== Viewership ratings ==
Week	Episodes	Date	Average Points	Peaking Points
1	01－05	26–30 Jan 2015	23	25
2	06－10	2–6 Feb 2015	24	26
3	11－15	9–13 Feb 2015	23	27
4	16－20	16–20 Feb 2015	22	24
5	21－25	23–27 Feb 2015	27	32
Total average			23.8	32

== Awards and nominations ==
Year	Ceremony	Category	Nominee	Result
2015	StarHub TVB Awards	My Favourite TVB Drama	Raising The Bar	Nominated
2015	StarHub TVB Awards	My Favourite TVB Actor	Ben Wong	Nominated
2015	StarHub TVB Awards	My Favourite TVB Actress	Grace Chan	Nominated
2015	StarHub TVB Awards	My Favourite TVB Supporting Actress	Natalie Tong	Nominated
2015	StarHub TVB Awards	My Favourite TVB Supporting Actress	Elaine Yiu	Nominated
2015	StarHub TVB Awards	My Favourite TVB Male TV Character	Ben Wong	Nominated
2015	StarHub TVB Awards	My Favourite TVB Female TV Character	Grace Chan	Nominated
2015	StarHub TVB Awards	My Favourite Onscreen Couple	Louis Cheung & Grace Chan	Nominated
2015	StarHub TVB Awards	My Favourite TVB Theme Song	You & Me (我和你) by Stephanie Ho	Nominated
2015	TVB Star Awards Malaysia	My Favourite TVB Drama Series	Raising The Bar	Nominated
2015	TVB Star Awards Malaysia	My Favourite TVB Actor in a Leading Role	Ben Wong	Nominated
2015	TVB Star Awards Malaysia	My Favourite TVB Actress in a Leading Role	Grace Chan	Nominated
2015	TVB Star Awards Malaysia	My Favourite TVB Actor in a Supporting Role	Louis Cheung	Nominated
2015	TVB Star Awards Malaysia	My Favourite TVB Actor in a Supporting Role	Ram Chiang	Nominated
2015	TVB Star Awards Malaysia	My Favourite TVB Actor in a Supporting Role	Timothy Cheng	Nominated
2015	TVB Star Awards Malaysia	My Favourite TVB Actress in a Supporting Role	Elaine Yiu	Won
2015	TVB Star Awards Malaysia	My Favourite TVB On-Screen Couple	Louis Cheung & Grace Chan	Nominated
2015	TVB Star Awards Malaysia	My Favourite TVB On-Screen Couple	Ben Wong & Elaine Yiu	Nominated
2015	TVB Star Awards Malaysia	My Favourite TVB Drama Theme Song	You & Me (我和你) by Stephanie Ho	Nominated
2015	TVB Star Awards Malaysia	My Favourite Top 16 TVB Drama Characters	Ben Wong	Won
2015	TVB Star Awards Malaysia	My Favourite Top 16 TVB Drama Characters	Elaine Yiu	Won
2015	TVB Anniversary Awards	TVB Anniversary Award for Best Drama	Raising The Bar	Nominated
2015	TVB Anniversary Awards	TVB Anniversary Award for Best Actor	Ben Wong	Nominated
2015	TVB Anniversary Awards	TVB Anniversary Award for Best Actress	Grace Chan	Nominated
2015	TVB Anniversary Awards	TVB Anniversary Award for Best Actress	Elaine Yiu	Nominated
2015	TVB Anniversary Awards	TVB Anniversary Award for Best Supporting Actor	Ram Chiang	Nominated
2015	TVB Anniversary Awards	TVB Anniversary Award for Best Supporting Actor	Timothy Cheng	Nominated
2015	TVB Anniversary Awards	TVB Anniversary Award for Best Supporting Actress	Natalie Tong	Nominated
2015	TVB Anniversary Awards	TVB Anniversary Award for Best Supporting Actress	Stephanie Ho	Nominated
2015	TVB Anniversary Awards	TVB Anniversary Award for Best Supporting Actress	Jeannie Chan	Nominated
2015	TVB Anniversary Awards	TVB Anniversary Award for Best Supporting Actress	Elena Kong	Nominated
2015	TVB Anniversary Awards	TVB Anniversary Award for Most Popular Male Character	Ben Wong	Nominated
2015	TVB Anniversary Awards	TVB Anniversary Award for Most Popular Female Character	Stephanie Ho	Nominated
2015	TVB Anniversary Awards	TVB Anniversary Award for Favourite Drama Song	You & Me (我和你) by Stephanie Ho	Nominated
2015	TVB Anniversary Awards	TVB Anniversary Award for Favourite Drama Song	You Are The One (面前人) by Louis Cheung & Grace Chan	Nominated
