= William Chak =

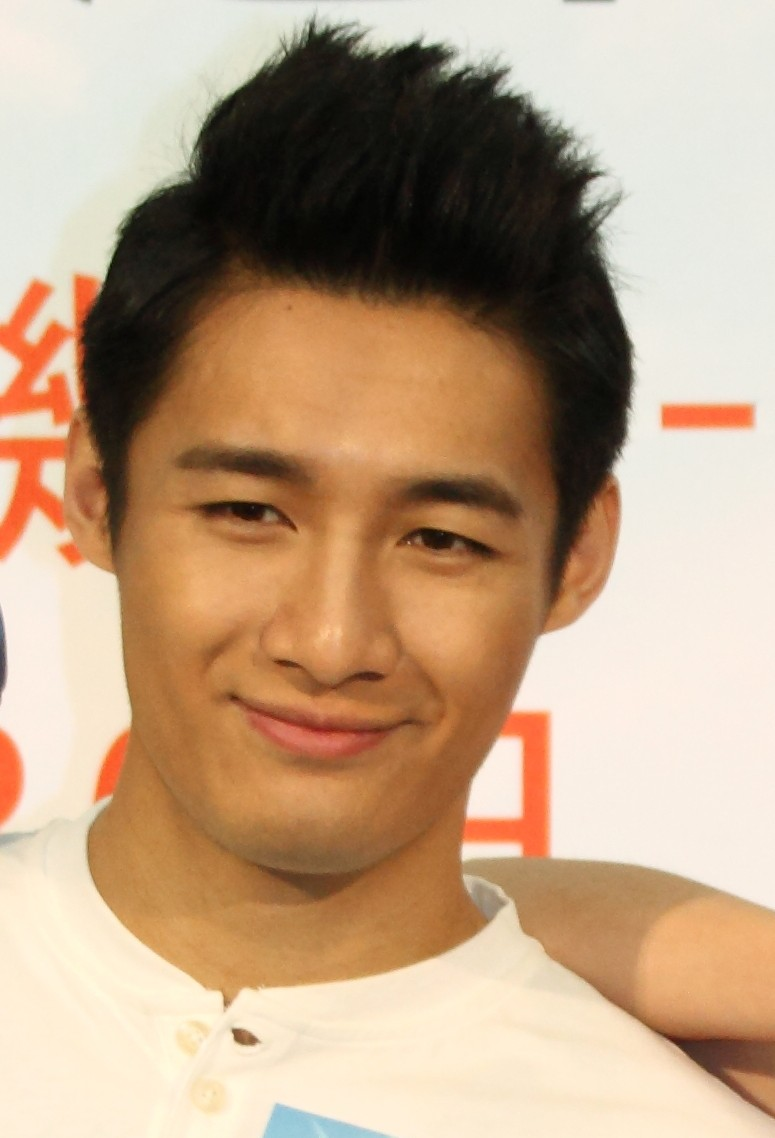
- Chak in 2014
- Born: 29 March 1985 (age 41); Hong Kong
- Occupations: Actor; presenter
- Years active: 2005–present
- Awards: Mr. Hong Kong; 2010

Chinese name
Transcriptions
Standard Mandarin
- Hanyu Pinyin: Zhái Wēilián
Yue: Cantonese
- Jyutping: Zaak6 Wai1 Lim4
- Musical career
- Also known as: 翟廉

William Chak (Chinese: 翟威廉; born 29 March 1985) is a Hong Kong actor and presenter who achieved fame through TVB's 2010 Mr. Hong Kong contest. He formerly performed under the stage name Chak Fung (翟鋒).

== Life and career ==
When Chak was eighteen, he traveled to Tokyo, Japan, as an exchange student and performed as a comedic dancer in the streets to earn tuition money. After winning the 1st runner up at Hong Kong ATV's 2005 Mr. Asia Contest, he returned to Japan to finish his schooling. In 2006, he signed an artiste contract with ATV. In 2008, Chak graduated from N-atv's Artiste Training Class. After his contracted with ATV ended in 2009, Chak stayed in South Korea for a year, and earned a black belt in Taekwondo. He returned to Hong Kong in 2010 and joined TVB's 2010 Mr. Hong Kong contest, and holds the record for the first Mr. Hong Kong to win eight different awards.

== Filmography ==
=== Film ===
Year	Title	Role	Notes
2011	Turning Point 2	Assistant Officer Tak	Cameo
2012	I Love Hong Kong 2012	Siu-hung's boyfriend	Cameo
2013	I Love Hong Kong 2013		
2013	Blue Magic		
2016	Buddy Cops		
2016	Line Walker		

=== Television drama ===
Title	Title	Role	Notes
2005–06	Happy Family	Ching Kwong-fai	Sitcom recurring role
2006	Hong Kong Criminal Files	Ng Chin-wah	
2006	Relentless Justice	young Yip Chung-yin	
2007	Teen Waves		
2007–08	Mahjong Gathering	Tang Sin-hang	Sitcom recurring role
2008	Today in Court		Episode 11
2011	Be Home for Dinner	Doctor	Episodes 152–153
2011	Forensic Heroes III	Frankie	Episode 1–2
2012	L'Escargot	Randy	Episode 11–12
2012	Let It Be Love	Lau Chung-lam	Episode 3
2012	Daddy Good Deeds	Constable Lau Hong-wah	
2012	Gloves Come Off	Kwok Tze-ho	
2012	House of Harmony and Vengeance	Ngo Suet-chung	
2012	No Good Either Way	Brian Sing Kar-yan	
2012	Tiger Cubs	Asst. Sergeant Cheung Kai-kwong	
2012	Highs and Lows	Gangster (cameo)	Episode 22
2013	Season of Love	Jack Chan	Episodes 6–10: "Chapter of Summer"
2013	Sergeant Tabloid	Constable Yau Man-chi (Delay Gor)	Previously warehoused; released overseas April 2012
2013	Triumph in the Skies II	Tucker Luk Wah-tak	
2013	Sniper Standoff	Asst. Sergeant Lau Kwai	
2014	Outbound Love		Guest star
2014	Ruse of Engagement		Guest star
2014	Shades of Life	Hung Jik	
2014	Come On, Cousin	To Man-jun	
2014–15	Tiger Cubs II	Asst. Sergeant Cheung Kai-kwong	
2014–15	Officer Geomancer	Caa Gam-doi	
2015	Raising the Bar	Sunny	Guest star episode 25
2015	Smooth Talker	Chung Kwok-wai	
2015	Limelight Years	Ken Pak	
2015	Every Step You Take	Lam Chung-wai	
2015	Angel In-the-Making	Mo Chi-fung	
2016	Between Love & Desire	Male Lead	Movie Actor
2016	Two Steps From Heaven	Dick	Tabloid Journalist/Rainmakers
2016	Come Home Love: Dinner at 8	Doctor Lee	Episode 174–176
2017	Recipes to Live By	Dung Eng-kit	Dung Family
2017	Romance of 7 Days	Kevin Chan Siu-ming	
2017	Destination Nowhere	Lo Sir	
2017	Married But Available	Yu Ga-jun	
2017	The No No Girl	Chow Gong-zi	
2017	Legal Mavericks	Aiden Ching Lap-Kiu	
2017	My Ages Apart	Fo Zui	
2018	The Forgotten Valley	Luk Shui Kit	Support Role
2018	Birth of a Hero	Master Min	Support Role
2018	Daddy Cool	Charles	
2018	Life on the Line	Angus Hong	
2022	Big White Duel 2	Tsang Tsz Long	Episode 7
2024	Call of Destiny	Lai Ka-ming	Supporting role

=== Hosting programmes ===
- 2006–07：Facts (Co-host)
- 2007–2008: Smart Class (Co-host)
- 2008: HD Game King (Co-host)
- 2008: Sik Yum, Sik Sik, Sik Heung Mei (識飲識食識香味) (Co-host)
- 2010: Kitchen Diva Louisa (Guest host)
- 2010: Papua Solomon's Treasure (Co-host)
- 2011: Hap Kar Foon Lok Ying San Chun (合家歡樂迎新春) (Co-host)
- 2011: Bao Chui Kei Yan (爆趣奇人) (Co-host)
- 2011: William's Korea Adventures
- 2012: The Sun Rises Still (Co-host)

== Awards ==
- 2005: Mr. Asia
  - 1st runner up
  - Hong Kong Male's Most SMS Popular Contestant
- 2010: Mr. Hong Kong

Awards and achievements
Mr. Hong Kong
Preceded by Jack Hui	Mr. Hong Kong; 2010	Succeeded by Clayton Li
