= Oscar Leung =

Hong Kong actor

- 梁烈唯
- Born: 梁烈唯; Leung Lit-wai
- Other names: Wai-wai (唯唯), Bad Boy (負皮王)
- Education: Caritas Shatin Marden Foundation Secondary School
- Occupation: Actor
- Children: 2
- Awards: TVB Anniversary Awards – Most Improved Male Artiste; 2012 L'Escargot; Queens of Diamonds and Hearts; House of Harmony and Vengeance; Tiger Cubs; The Confidant; Best Supporting Actor; 2018 OMG, Your Honour

Chinese name
Transcriptions
Standard Mandarin
- Hanyu Pinyin: Líang Lìe Weī
Yue: Cantonese
- Jyutping: Loeng4 Lit6 Wai4
- Website: weibo.com/leunglitwai

Oscar Leung Lit-wai (Chinese: 梁烈唯) is an actor previously contracted to TVB. He was an artist of Shaw Brothers (2020–2025).

== Personal life ==
Leung's father is a martial arts film actor. His uncle is Bryan Leung, a former TVB actor.

Leung married his girlfriend of 11 years and secondary school classmate, Lok Po-man, on New Year's Day 2014. The wedding was held at the InterContinental Hong Kong Hotel. In January 2017, his wife gave birth to a daughter via cesarean section, named Karina.

On January 3, 2019, he announced that he had changed his name to Leung King-fai.

In December 2022, Leung contracted Severe Acute Respiratory Syndrome Coronavirus 2 (SARS-CoV-2) while working in mainland China.

In October 2025, Leung announced that he would revert to his old name, Leung Lit-wai.

== Political views ==
In 2019, Leung was targeted by online image edits falsely claiming he participated in the June 9 anti-extradition bill march and a June 12 protest-related concert. He denied the claims, stated he did not join the demonstrations, and posted a video showing he was in Macau on June 12. Later, on August 1st, Army Day, he posted a message on Weibo to pay tribute to the People's Liberation Army, accompanied by the red background and white text "81". Leung also participated in the joint signature campaign supporting the National People's Congress decision on Hong Kong national security legislation.
