= 2014 TVB Star Awards Malaysia =

- Date: 23 November 2014
- Location: Arena of Stars
- Hosted by: Luisa Maria Leitão, Bob, Jarvis Chow, Shermaine Wong

Television/radio coverage
- Network: Astro Wah Lai Toi, TVB Entertainment News
- Produced by: TVB Entertainment News

The 2014 TVB Star Awards Malaysia (simplified Chinese: TVB 马来西亚星光荟萃颁奖典礼2014; traditional Chinese: TVB 馬來西亞星光薈萃頒獎典禮2014), presented by TVB Entertainment News, Astro, and MY FM in Malaysia, was an awards ceremony that recognised the best Hong Kong TVB television programmes that had aired on Malaysia's Astro Wah Lai Toi in 2014.

The ceremony took place on 23 November 2014 at the Arena of Stars in Genting Highlands, Pahang, Malaysia and was broadcast live through Malaysia's Astro Wah Lai Toi and Hong Kong's TVB Entertainment News channel. A rerun of the ceremony aired on Hong Kong's J2 on 29 November 2014.

== Winners and nominees ==
Winners are listed first, highlighted in boldface. The top three nominees are also highlighted in boldface. Andy Lau presented the Lifetime Achievement Award to Law Lan and Lau Kong.

=== Programs ===
My Favourite TVB Drama Series	My Favourite TVB Drama Song
**Line Walker**; **Outbound Love**; **Tomorrow Is Another Day**; Bounty Lady; Gilded Chopsticks; Storm In a Cocoon; Never Dance Alone; Black Heart White Soul; All That Is Bitter Is Sweet; Tiger Cubs II; Come On, Cousin; Overachievers	**"Love Is Not Easy" (越难越爱) from Line Walker – performed by Jinny Ng**; "Really Want To Hate You" (很想讨厌你) from Outbound Love – performed by Rosina Lam; "Constellations" (星斗群) from Never Dance Alone – performed by Shirley Kwan and Mag Lam; "Challenge" (考验) from Overachievers – performed by Fred Cheng; "Tomorrow Is Another Day" (再战明天) from Tomorrow Is Another Day – performed by Alfred Hui
My Favourite TVB Variety Programme	My Favourite TVB Informative Programme
**Walk the Walk, Talk the Talk**; A Time of Love; Nowhere Girls; Street Sorcerer's 2; Queen's Feast	**Wellness On the Go 2**; Guardians of Life; Easy Living; Old Jobs; Big Big World

=== Acting and hosting ===
Winners are listed first, highlighted in boldface. The top three nominees are also highlighted in boldface.

My Favourite TVB Actor in a Leading Role	My Favourite TVB Actress in a Leading Role
**Roger Kwok – Black Heart White Soul as Matt Ko**; **Ruco Chan – Outbound Love as Luk Kung-tsz**; **Raymond Lam – Line Walker as Sit Ka-keung (Bao Seed)**; Dayo Wong – Bounty Lady as Heung Kwong-nam; Bosco Wong – The Ultimate Addiction as Damon Cheuk; Kenneth Ma – Ghost Dragon of Cold Mountain as Chu Cheung-shing; Ron Ng – Black Heart White Soul as Cheung Lap-fun (Funny); Michael Miu – Line Walker as Cheuk Hoi; Lawrence Ng – Tomorrow Is Another Day as Man Sheung-shing; Joe Ma – Tiger Cubs II as Chin Hon-to; Wong Cho-lam – Come On, Cousin as Yau Tin; Wayne Lai – Overachievers as Mike Chiang	**Charmaine Sheh – Line Walker as Ding Siu-ka**; **Linda Chung – All That Is Bitter Is Sweet as To Kai-kei**; **Kate Tsui – Tomorrow Is Another Day as Yiu Oi-ka**; Aimee Chan – Outbound Love as Law Sik-sik; Tavia Yeung – Storm In a Cocoon as Tong Bing-bing; Priscilla Wong – Swipe Tap Love as Yu Chor-gin; Carman Lee – Never Dance Alone as Mo Siu-sze; Nancy Wu – The Ultimate Addiction as Anson Fong; Selena Li – Ghost Dragon of Cold Mountain as Yan Mei-leung / To Fa; Kristal Tin – Black Heart White Soul as May Tam; Louisa So – Rear Mirror as Anson Yiu; Joey Meng – Come On, Cousin as Chai Jing-man
My Favourite TVB Actor in a Supporting Role	My Favourite TVB Actress in a Supporting Role
**Benz Hui – Line Walker as Tam Foon-hei (Foon-hei Gor)**; **Him Law – Tiger Cubs II as Yu Hok-lai**; **Ram Chiang – Come On, Cousin as Ko Yum**; Ben Wong – Gilded Chopsticks as Yongzheng Emperor; Lawrence Cheng – Never Dance Alone as Wong Kwok-leung; Raymond Cho – Ghost Dragon of Cold Mountain as Hung Sap-kau; Louis Cheung – Black Heart White Soul as Marco Ma; Oscar Leung – Line Walker as Cheung Muk-wing; Ngo Ka-nin – All That Is Bitter Is Sweet as To Yung; Vincent Wong – Tomorrow Is Another Day as Kiu Ching-kiu; Raymond Wong Ho-yin – Overachievers as Hugo Chung; Edwin Siu – Overachievers as Yuen Siu-tin	**Sharon Chan – Line Walker as Yan Mok**; **Rosina Lam – Outbound Love as Ching Chin-tsan**; **Natalie Tong – All That Is Bitter Is Sweet as Hui Kwan-yeuk**; Eliza Sam – Coffee Cat Mama as Grace Pin; Elaine Yiu – Swipe Tape Love as Emma Choi; Gloria Yip – Never Dance Alone as Akina Leung; Leanne Li – Black Heart White Soul as Scarlett Sze; Elena Kong – Line Walker as Katie Mok; Josie Ho – Tomorrow Is Another Day as Ding Ho-ho; Mandy Wong – Tiger Cubs II as So Man-keung; Ivana Wong – Come On, Cousin as Lam Suet; Maggie Shiu – Overachievers as Kwan Fa-lai (Flo Jeh)
My Favourite TVB Promising Actor	My Favourite TVB Promising Actress
**Sammy Sum – Bounty Lady, Line Walker and All That Is Bitter Is Sweet**; Tony Hung – Outbound Love, Swipe Tap Love and Rear Mirror; Matt Yeung – Outbound Love, Storm In a Cocoon and Black Heart White Soul; Louis Cheung – Gilded Chopsticks, Black Heart White Soul and Come On, Cousin; Hugo Wong – The Ultimate Addiction	**Samantha Ko – Outbound Love, Line Walker and All That Is Bitter Is Sweet**; Tracy Chu – Tomorrow Is Another Day; Rosina Lam – Outbound Love and Ghost Dragon of Cold Mountain; Vivien Yeo – Outbound Love, Ruse of Engagement and Black Heart White Soul; Skye Chan – Line Walker
My Favourite TVB On-Screen Couple	My Favourite TVB Variety Show Host
**Ruco Chan and Aimee Chan – Outbound Love**; **Dayo Wong and Kate Tsui – Bounty Lady**; **Raymond Lam and Charmaine Sheh – Line Walker**; Bosco Wong and Eliza Sam – Coffee Cat Mama; Raymond Wong Ho-yin and Priscilla Wong – Swipe Tap Love; Lawrence Cheng and Carman Lee – Never Dance Alone; Roger Kwok and Kristal Tin – Black Heart White Soul; Sammy Sum and Sharon Chan – Line Walker; Joe Ma and Linda Chung – Tiger Cubs II; Roger Kwok and Joey Meng – Come On, Cousin	**Nancy Sit and Wong Cho-lam for Walk the Walk, Talk the Talk**; Lawrence Ng for Guardians of Life; Priscilla Wong and Tony Hung for Pilgrimage to Football Meccas; Liza Wang and Amigo Choi for Queen's Feast
My Favourite TVB Characters	
Ruco Chan – Outbound Love as Luk Kung-tsz; Tavia Yeung – Storm In a Cocoon as Tong Bing-bing; Bosco Wong – The Ultimate Addiction as Damon Cheuk; Nancy Wu – The Ultimate Addiction as Anson Fong; Kenneth Ma – Ghost Dragon of Cold Mountain as Chu Cheung-shing; Selena Li – Ghost Dragon of Cold Mountain as Yan Mei-leung / To Fa; Roger Kwok – Black Heart White Soul as Matt Ko; Michael Miu – Line Walker as Cheuk Hoi; Raymond Lam – Line Walker as Sit Ka-keung (Bao Seed); Charmaine Sheh – Line Walker as Ding Siu-ka; Sharon Chan – Line Walker as Yan Mok; Benz Hui – Line Walker as Tam Foon-hei (Foon-hei Gor); Linda Chung – All That Is Bitter Is Sweet as To Kai-kei; Kate Tsui – Tomorrow Is Another Day as Yiu Oi-ka; Him Law – Tiger Cubs II as Yu Hok-lai	

=== Other ===
TVB Lifetime Achievement Award

- Law Lan and Lau Kong

Rising TVB Star in Malaysia

- Fred Cheng
