= TVB Star Award for Favourite Supporting Performance =

The following is a list of the TVB Star Awards Malaysia winners and nominees for My Favourite TVB Actor and Actress in a Supporting Role. The award was first introduced in 2007 at the 2006 Astro Wah Lai Toi Drama Awards as My Favourite Supporting Character. The award was separated into Supporting Actor and Actress in 2010. The ceremony was renamed TVB Star Awards Malaysia in 2013.

== Winners and nominees ==
Table key
‡	Indicates a TVB Anniversary Award-winning performance

=== 2000s ===
Year	Category	Artist	Drama	Role(s)
2006
2006	Favourite; Supporting			
2006	Favourite; Supporting	Raymond Cho	Healing Hands III	Dr. Chris Heung
2006	Favourite; Supporting	Gordon Liu	Shades of Truth	Inspector Wong Kam-yan (K.Y.)
2006	Favourite; Supporting	Wayne Lai	The Conqueror's Story	Hon Sun
2006	Favourite; Supporting	Johnson Lee	Just Love	Kot Tak-wan
2006	Favourite; Supporting	Li Fung	The Gateau Affairs	Kuk Kei
2007
2007	Favourite; Supporting			
2007	Favourite; Supporting	Wayne Lai	Safe Guards	Sheung Chung
2007	Favourite; Supporting	Hui Shiu-hung	Life Made Simple	Tong Fuk-shui
2007	Favourite; Supporting	Kiki Sheung	The Charm Beneath	Lee Nga-sin
2007	Favourite; Supporting	Jacky Wong	Always Ready	Jacky Yip
2007	Favourite; Supporting	Ram Chiang	Safe Guards	Sheung Ching-man
2008
2008	Favourite; Supporting			
2008	Favourite; Supporting	Hui Shiu-hung	Dicey Business	Chow Fuk-wing
2008	Favourite; Supporting	Louis Yuen ‡	Heart of Greed	Ling Bo
2008	Favourite; Supporting	Kingdom Yuen	The Price of Greed	Lo Sei-leung
2008	Favourite; Supporting	Li Shing-cheong	Heart of Greed	Sheung Joi-tak
2008	Favourite; Supporting	Lily Leung	The Price of Greed	Wong Lai-mei

=== 2010s ===
Year	Category	Artist	Drama	Role(s)
2010
2010	Favourite Supporting; Actor			
2010	Favourite Supporting; Actor	Ngo Ka-nin	No Regrets	Tong Kat
2010	Favourite Supporting; Actor	Derek Kok	The Season of Fate	Leung Kau-mui
2010	Favourite Supporting; Actor	John Chiang	A Chip Off the Old Block	Ko Shan-chuen
2010	Favourite Supporting; Actor	Michael Tse	My Better Half	Ching Yee
2010	Favourite Supporting; Actor	Raymond Cho	Fly with Me	Tsui Wing-fai
2010	Favourite Supporting; Actor	Kenny Wong	Fly with Me	Yeung Ho-yin
2010	Favourite Supporting; Actor	Joel Chan	Sisters of Pearl	Chow Yuk-tsai
2010	Favourite Supporting; Actor	Johnson Lee	A Pillow Case of Mystery II	Pillow Spirit
2010	Favourite Supporting; Actor	Power Chan	Beauty Knows No Pain	Chi Lam
2010	Favourite Supporting; Actor	Raymond Wong Ho-yin	No Regrets	Yeung Yeung
2010	Favourite Supporting; Actress			
2010	Favourite Supporting; Actress	Fala Chen ‡	No Regrets	Lau Ching
2010	Favourite Supporting; Actress	Gigi Wong	A Chip Off the Old Block	Tam Lan-ching
2010	Favourite Supporting; Actress	Sharon Chan	The Beauty of the Game	Cally Tong
2010	Favourite Supporting; Actress	Natalie Tong	A Fistful of Stances	Ying Ngan-ming
2010	Favourite Supporting; Actress	Joyce Tang	Beauty Knows No Pain	BiBi Yue
2010	Favourite Supporting; Actress	Susanna Kwan	Can't Buy Me Love	Ding Hoi-lei
2010	Favourite Supporting; Actress	Aimee Chan	Every Move You Make	Perlie Ching
2010	Favourite Supporting; Actress	Susan Tse	No Regrets	Cheng Long-hei
2010	Favourite Supporting; Actress	Kara Hui	No Regrets	Ng Lai-sim
2010	Favourite Supporting; Actress	Nancy Wu	No Regrets	Ma Lai-wah
2011
2011	Favourite Supporting; Actor			
2011	Favourite Supporting; Actor	Raymond Wong Ho-yin	Twilight Investigation	Chow Ka-sing
2011	Favourite Supporting; Actor	Lam Tsz-sin	Ghetto Justice	George Mike, Jr.
2011	Favourite Supporting; Actor	Damian Lau	Lives of Omission	SSP Harry Kung
2011	Favourite Supporting; Actor	Ben Wong ‡	Lives of Omission	Tang Kwok-ban (Lat Keung)
2011	Favourite Supporting; Actor	Edwin Siu	Forensic Heroes III	Ken Ho
2011	Favourite Supporting; Actress			
2011	Favourite Supporting; Actress	Sharon Chan ‡	Ghetto Justice	Ho Li-ching
2011	Favourite Supporting; Actress	Nancy Wu	Gun Metal Grey	SGT Sze Hui
2011	Favourite Supporting; Actress	Natalie Tong	The Other Truth	Cecilia "Big C" Pun
2011	Favourite Supporting; Actress	Aimee Chan	Forensic Heroes III	Angel Chiang
2011	Favourite Supporting; Actress	Elena Kong	River of Wine	Ding Ka-pik
2012
2012	Favourite Supporting; Actor			
2012	Favourite Supporting; Actor	Him Law	The Hippocratic Crush	Dr. Yeung Pui-chung
2012	Favourite Supporting; Actor	Ben Wong	Highs and Lows	Inspector Brian Poon
2012	Favourite Supporting; Actor	Edwin Siu	Daddy Good Deeds	Yip Kwai (Yap)
2012	Favourite Supporting; Actor	Kenny Wong	Master of Play	Eric
2012	Favourite Supporting; Actor	Jerry Ku ‡	Divas in Distress	So Gay
2012	Favourite Supporting; Actress			
2012	Favourite Supporting; Actress	Nancy Wu ‡	Gloves Come Off	Ding Yan-chi
2012	Favourite Supporting; Actress	Mandy Wong	L'Escargot	Lou Siu-lan
2012	Favourite Supporting; Actress	Kristal Tin	King Maker	Yim Sam-leung
2012	Favourite Supporting; Actress	Aimee Chan	The Last Steep Ascent	Tin Oi-tai
2012	Favourite Supporting; Actress	Elena Kong	Silver Spoon, Sterling Shackles	Yvonne Yik
2013
2013	Favourite Supporting; Actor			
2013	Favourite Supporting; Actor	Him Law	Triumph in the Skies II	Jim Jim
2013	Favourite Supporting; Actor	Edwin Siu	A Great Way to Care II	Jackson Leung
2013	Favourite Supporting; Actor	Vincent Wong	A Change of Heart	Tong Sin-chi
2013	Favourite Supporting; Actor	Ngo Ka-nin	Always and Ever	Yuen Kwai
2013	Favourite Supporting; Actor	Benjamin Yuen	The Hippocratic Crush II	Dr. Benjamin Lau
2013	Favourite Supporting; Actress			
2013	Favourite Supporting; Actress	Nancy Wu	Triumph in the Skies II	CoCo Cheuk
2013	Favourite Supporting; Actress	Ivana Wong	Inbound Troubles	Ng Chi-ching
2013	Favourite Supporting; Actress	Mandy Wong	A Change of Heart	Ha Sze-ka
2013	Favourite Supporting; Actress	Elena Kong ‡	Triumph in the Skies II	Heather Fong
2013	Favourite Supporting; Actress	Eliza Sam	Sniper Standoff	Lai Chun
2014
2014	Favourite Supporting; Actor			
2014	Favourite Supporting; Actor	Hui Shiu-hung	Line Walker	Tam Foon-hei (Foon-hei Gor)
2014	Favourite Supporting; Actor	Him Law	Tiger Cubs II	ASGT Yu Hok-lai
2014	Favourite Supporting; Actor	Ram Chiang ‡	Come On, Cousin	Ko Yum
2014	Favourite Supporting; Actress			
2014	Favourite Supporting; Actress	Sharon Chan	Line Walker	Yan Mok
2014	Favourite Supporting; Actress	Rosina Lam	Young Charioteers	Ching Chin-tsan
2014	Favourite Supporting; Actress	Natalie Tong	All That is Bitter is Sweet	Hui Kwan-yeuk
2015
2015	Favourite Supporting; Actor			
2015	Favourite Supporting; Actor	Benjamin Yuen	The Fixer	Mak Hang-chik
2015	Favourite Supporting; Actor	Louis Cheung	Raising the Bar	Quinton Chow
2015	Favourite Supporting; Actor	Mat Yeung	Momentary Lapse of Reason	Shum Yat-yin
2015	Favourite Supporting; Actress			
2015	Favourite Supporting; Actress	Elaine Yiu	Raising the Bar	Vivian Cheung
2015	Favourite Supporting; Actress	Elena Kong	Smooth Talker	Lam Ah-lui
2015	Favourite Supporting; Actress	Rosina Lam	Momentary Lapse of Reason	Fa Ying-yuet
2016
2016	Favourite Supporting; Actor			
2016	Favourite Supporting; Actor	Mat Yeung	My Dangerous Mafia Retirement Plan	Liu Sau-kei
2016	Favourite Supporting; Actor	Him Law	Fashion War	Francis Fan Gwok-bong
2016	Favourite Supporting; Actor	Philip Ng	A Fist Within Four Walls	Lung Shing-fu
2016	Favourite Supporting; Actress			
2016	Favourite Supporting; Actress	Joyce Tang	House of Spirits	Po Yan
2016	Favourite Supporting; Actress	Grace Wong	A Fist Within Four Walls	Fa Man
2016	Favourite Supporting; Actress	Moon Lau	A Fist Within Four Walls	Or Tak-li
2017
2017	Favourite Supporting; Actor			
2017	Favourite Supporting; Actor	Joel Chan	The Unholy Alliance	Kent Ling Tsin-yau
2017	Favourite Supporting; Actor	Mat Yeung	My Dearly Sinful Mind	Tung Yat
2017	Favourite Supporting; Actor	Owen Cheung	Legal Mavericks	"GoGo" Kuk Yat-ha
2017	Favourite Supporting; Actress			
2017	Favourite Supporting; Actress	Elaine Yiu	The Unholy Alliance	Kate Wai Yi-yau
2017	Favourite Supporting; Actress	Samantha Ko	My Unfair Lady	Tin Mut
2017	Favourite Supporting; Actress	Tracy Chu	Legal Mavericks	Yanice Tai Tin-yan
