= 2012 My AOD Favourites Awards =

- Date: 2 December 2012
- Location: Sunway Convention Centre

Television/radio coverage
- Network: Astro On Demand
- Produced by: Astro, TVBI

The 2012 My AOD Favourites Awards (simplified Chinese: MY AOD我的最爱颁奖典礼2012; traditional Chinese: MY AOD我的最愛頒獎典禮2012), presented by Astro in Malaysia, was an awards ceremony that recognised the best Hong Kong TVB television drama series that had aired on Malaysia's Astro On Demand (AOD) in 2012.

The ceremony took place on 2 December 2012 at the Sunway Convention Centre in Kuala Lumpur, Malaysia. It was broadcast live to Malaysian audiences through AOD.

== Winners and nominees ==
Top five nominees are in bold.

My Favourite Drama Series	
**The Hippocratic Crush**; **Witness Insecurity**; **The Last Steep Ascent**; **Highs and Lows**; **The Confidant**; When Heaven Burns; Gloves Come Off; Master of Play; Three Kingdoms RPG; Ghetto Justice II; King Maker; Silver Spoon, Sterling Shackles	
My Favourite Actor in a Leading Role	My Favourite Actress in a Leading Role
**Kenneth Ma as Cheung Yat-kin in The Hippocratic Crush**; **Raymond Lam as Wai Sai-lok in Highs and Lows**; **Moses Chan as Ivan Cheung in Master of Play**; **Wayne Lai as Li Lianying in The Confidant**; **Bosco Wong as Sam Hui in Witness Insecurity**; Roger Kwok as King Xuan of Qi in Queens of Diamonds and Hearts; Michael Tse as Lam Yat-yat in Sergeant Tabloid; Kevin Cheng as Tong Sap-yat in Gloves Come Off; Raymond Wong as Pat Ka-shing in Gloves Come Off; Ruco Chan as Alex Mo in No Good Either Way; Michael Miu as Heung Wing in Highs and Lows; Damian Lau as Sir Arthur Chung, JP in Silver Spoon, Sterling Shackles	**Tavia Yeung as Hong Tze-yu in The Hippocratic Crush**; **Charmaine Sheh as Hazel Yip in When Heaven Burns**; **Myolie Wu as Kris Wong in Ghetto Justice II**; **Kate Tsui as Pat Chan in Highs and Lows**; **Linda Chung as Hailey Kiu in Witness Insecurity**; Fala Chen as Chung Mo-yim in Queens of Diamonds and Hearts; Sharon Chan as Ha Ying-chun in Queens of Diamonds and Hearts; Maggie Shiu as Esther Lee in Master of Play; Liza Wang as Sheung Ying-hung in Divas in Distress; Gigi Wong as Miu Sing-ho in Divas in Distress; Maggie Cheung Ho-yee as Ku Sun-yuet in The Last Steep Ascent; Michelle Yim as Empress Dowager Cixi in The Confidant
My Favourite Actor in a Supporting Role	My Favourite Actress in a Supporting Role
**Him Law as Yeung Pui-chung in The Hippocratic Crush**; **Ben Wong as Brian Poon in Highs and Lows**; **Edwin Siu as Yip Kwai (Yap) in Daddy Good Deeds**; **Kenny Wong as Eric in Master of Play**; **Koo Ming-wah as So Gay in Divas in Distress**; Lau Dan as Fung Chi-ming in Let It Be Love; Edwin Siu as Yip Kwai in Daddy Good Deeds; Mak Cheung-ching as Kiu Bo-lung in House of Harmony and Vengeance; Ram Chiang as Kiu Kong-ho in Witness Insecurity; Jazz Lam as George Mike Jr. in Ghetto Justice II; Ngo Ka-nin as Chiu Kwai-sing in King Maker	**Nancy Wu as Ding Yan-chi in Gloves Come Off**; **Mandy Wong as Lou Siu-lan in L'Escargot**; **Kristal Tin as Yim Sam-leung in King Maker**; **Aimee Chan as Tin Oi-tai in The Last Steep Ascending**; **Elena Kong as Yvonne Yik in Silver Spoon, Sterling Shackles**; Elaine Yiu as Ko Yee-kiu in Bottled Passion; Angela Tong as Chu Lau-yuet in House of Harmony and Vengeance; Rachel Kan as Michelle in Master of Play; Florence Kwok as Violet Che in No Good Either Way; Natalie Tong as Yu Ching in King Maker
My Favourite Promising Actor	My Favourite Promising Actress
**Oscar Leung as Kwan Ka-hong in L'Escargot**; Jason Chan Chi-san as Aaron Yiu in No Good Either Way; Otto Chan as Dai Chi-lik in Gloves Come Off; Glen Lee as Edwin in Master of Play; MC Jin as Ng Dak-tim in Highs and Lows	**Mandy Wong as Lou Siu-lan in L'Escargot**; Cilla Kung as Ko Yu-po in Daddy Good Deeds; Katy Kung as Chong Po-kei in Gloves Come Off; Eliza Sam as Hannah Heung in Divas in Distress; Samantha Ko as Keung Yim-ping
My Favourite Drama Theme Song	My Favourite On-Screen Couple
**"End of Innocence" (幼稚完) by Raymond Lam — Highs and Lows**; "Ignorance of Youth" (年少无知) by Bowie Lam, Moses Chan & Kenny Wong — When Heaven Burns; "Serial Drama" (连续剧) by Joey Yung — The Hippocratic Crush; "One Life One Heart" (一生一心) by Hubert Wu — The Last Steep Ascent; "The Most Blissful Thing" (最幸福的事) by Linda Chung — Witness Insecurity	**Kenneth Ma and Tavia Yeung in The Hippocratic Crush**; **Raymond Lam and Kate Tsui in Highs and Lows**; **Bosco Wong and Linda Chung in Witness Insecurity**; **Kevin Cheng and Myolie Wu in Ghetto Justice II**; **Him Law and Mandy Wong in Divas in Distress**; Raymond Wong Ho-yin and Niki Chow in Bottled Passion; Moses Chan and Charmaine Sheh in Let It Be Love; Nathan Ngai and Candy Chang in The Hippocratic Crush; Kevin Cheng and Selena Li in Gloves Come Off; Ruco Chan and Kristal Tin in No Good Either Way
My Favourite Legendary Character in the Last 5 Years	My Favourite Outstanding Popularity King
**Michael Tse as "Laughing Gor" Leung Siu-tong in E.U.**; Wayne Lai as Chai Kau in Rosy Business; Kevin Cheng as Law Lik-ah in Ghetto Justice; Charmaine Sheh as Lau Sam-ho in Beyond the Realm of Conscience; Sheren Tang as Cheng Kau-mui in No Regrets	**Koo Ming-wah as So Gay in Divas in Distress**; Mandy Wong as Lau Siu-lan in L'Escargot; Edwin Siu as Yip Kwai in Daddy Good Deeds; Ram Chiang as Kiu Kong-ho in Witness Insecurity; Florence Kwok as Violet Che in No Good Either Way
My Top 15 Favourite Drama Characters	
Him Law as Yeung Pui-chung in The Hippocratic Crush; Ron Ng as Ding Koon-fung in L'Escargot; Linda Chung as Hailey Kiu in Witness Insecurity; Kate Tsui as Pat Chan in Highs and Lows; Michael Tse as Lam Yat-yat in Sergeant Tabloid; Kenneth Ma as Cheung Yat-kin in The Hippocratic Crush; Roger Kwok as King Xuan of Qi in Queens of Diamonds and Hearts; Tavia Yeung as Hong Tze-yu in The Hippocratic Crush; Raymond Lam as Wai Sai-lok in Highs and Lows; Wayne Lai as Li Lianying in The Confidant; Bosco Wong as Sam Hui in Witness Insecurity; Kevin Cheng as Tong Sap-yat in Gloves Come Off; Myolie Wu as Kris Wong in Ghetto Justice II; Ruco Chan as Alex Mo in No Good Either Way; Moses Chan as Ivan Cheung in Master of Play	
