= Ruco Chan =

Hong Kong actor and singer

- 陳展鵬
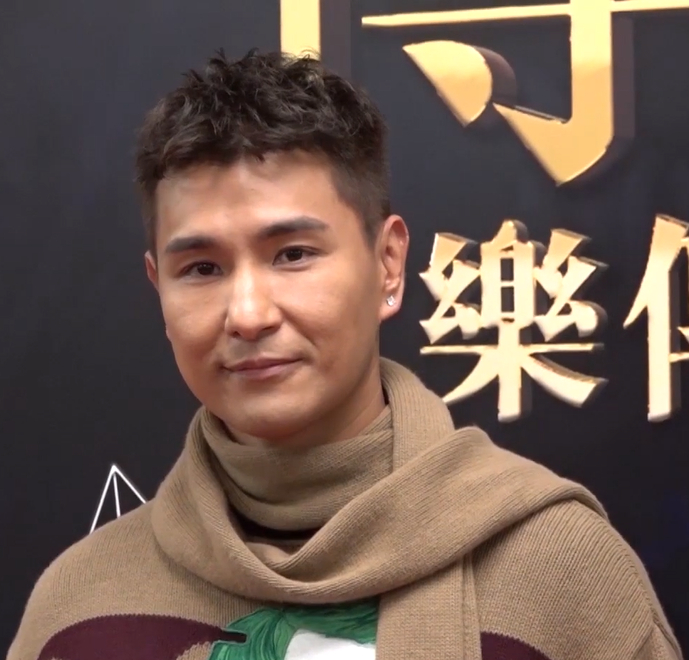
- Chan in 2020
- Born: Chan Chin-pang; 14 January 1977 (age 49); British Hong Kong
- Other name: 煎pang (Chin Pang)
- Occupations: Actor; singer
- Years active: 1994–present
- Notable work: Captain of Destiny; A Fist Within Four Walls; Sinister Beings; I’ve Got The Power
- Spouse: Phoebe Sin (m. 2018)
- Children: 1 daughter (Quinta Chan)
- Awards: TVB Anniversary Awards – Most Popular Male Character; 2015 Captain of Destiny; Best Actor; 2016 A Fist Within Four Walls; Favourite TVB Actor in Malaysia; 2022 I’ve Got The Power StarHub TVB Awards – My Favourite TVB Actor; 2014 Ruse of Engagement; 2015 Captain of Destiny; 2016 A Fist Within Four Walls TVB Star Awards Malaysia – Favourite TVB Actor; 2015 Captain of Destiny; 2016 A Fist Within Four Walls
- Musical career
- Genres: Cantopop
- Instrument: Guitar
- Labels: PolyGram (1997–99); Sony Music Entertainment (2016–present)

Ruco Chan
- Traditional Chinese: 陳展鵬
- Simplified Chinese: 陈展鹏
Transcriptions
Standard Mandarin
- Hanyu Pinyin: Chén Zhǎnpéng
Yue: Cantonese
- Yale Romanization: Chàhn Jín-pàahng
- Jyutping: Can^{4} Zin^{2} Paang^{4}

Chan Chin-pang (Chinese: 陳展鵬; born 14 January 1977), better known as Ruco Chan, is a Hong Kong actor and singer.

Chan is the first TVB actor to win My Favourite TVB Actor at the StarHub TVB Awards for three consecutive years (2014, 2015, 2016), and is also the first actor to make two consecutive wins for Favourite TVB Actor at the TVB Star Awards Malaysia (2015, 2016). In 2016, Chan won the TVB Anniversary Award for Best Actor with his performance in the action drama A Fist Within Four Walls.

== Early life ==
Chan was born in Hong Kong with ancestral roots from Xiamen, Fujian. His father was a firefighter and his mother was a tailor. Influenced by his father at a young age, Chan developed a love for table tennis and joined the Hong Kong Table Tennis team after receiving rigorous training at the Jubilee Sports Academy when he was thirteen. He was the youngest player to represent Hong Kong in overseas competitions at the time. After five years of committing to the sport, Chan left the team upon finishing his high school education exams. After graduation, Chan was accepted into a technical institution and, attracted by the 3,000 HKD monthly income, also joined TVB's Artiste Training Class. Being only seventeen at the time, Chan was required to have his parents' signed approval before signing a management contract with TVB. His father initially refused, but later gave in when TVB offered an automatic contract cancellation if Chan didn't do well in his classes. Chan graduated from TVB's Seventh Artiste Training Class of 1994.

== Career ==
Chan's television debut was in the serial drama Instinct in 1994, where he briefly appeared as the young friend of Ekin Cheng's character Pao Man-lung. Weeks later, he made a brief appearance in the sitcom A Kindred Spirit as the friend of Andy, portrayed by Hawick Lau, who was Chan's training class classmate. For the next three years, Chan performed in minor roles in over eighteen TVB television dramas. Chan left TVB in 1998 after signing a record deal with PolyGram. Prior to the release of his debut EP, Universal acquired PolyGram and Chan's contract with PolyGram became defunct. For the next few years, Chan won several small supporting roles in various Hong Kong films. When he had no filming jobs, he would work as a renovation worker, earning only 300 HKD per day.

In 2001, Chan signed with ATV to start working on television acting again. According to Chan, his first two years at ATV were "rough, uncomfortable, and filled with regret." Despite his past acting experiences in both television and film, ATV only gave him minor roles and spots in music videos. Chan's first major role was in the 2004 period drama Love in a Miracle, playing the main antagonist. He was then given a major supporting role in My Date with a Vampire III (2004). Besides performing in television dramas, Chan also made appearances in many variety shows, and hosted many gala ceremonies for ATV.

Unsatisfied with his career at ATV, Chan returned to TVB in 2008 and signed an eight-year management contract with the company. He was cast into supporting roles in several successful television dramas, such as The Threshold of a Persona (2009), Burning Flame III (2009), The Mysteries of Love (2010), Ghost Writer (2010), When Lanes Merge (2010), and Every Move You Make (2010), most of them being villainous roles. In 2011, Chan garnered media attention and critical acclaim for his portrayal of barrister Keith Lau in the television legal drama The Other Truth. He earned his first nominations for Best Actor and My Favourite Male Character at the 2011 TVB Anniversary Awards.

Chan's subsequent performances won him critical acclaim, most notably in Brother's Keeper (2013), Ruse of Engagement (2014), and Captain of Destiny (2015), the latter winning him the TVB Anniversary Award for Most Popular Male Character. He is the first actor to win My Favourite TVB Actor at the StarHub TVB Awards for three consecutive years (2014, 2015, 2016), and is also the first actor to make two consecutive wins for My Favourite TVB Actor at the TVB Star Awards Malaysia (2015, 2016). In 2016, Chan won the TVB Anniversary Award for Best Actor for A Fist Within Four Walls.

== Personal life ==
Chan began a romantic relationship with Miss Asia winner Eunis Yiu in 2008. They broke up in 2010.

In the next few years, there were rumours of Chan dating actresses, but none have resulted in quite as much media attention as his Brother's Keeper and All That is Bitter is Sweet partner Linda Chung and later, A Fist Within Four Walls and The Unholy Alliance partner Nancy Wu. Chan repeatedly denied these rumours and these rumours turned out to be false.

In 2016, while a guest judge for Miss Hong Kong, he met contestant Phoebe Sin and subsequently in March 2017, was photographed in a car with her on The Peak. The media highlighted this relationship and on 10 September 2018, Chan announced his engagement to Phoebe. They were married on 13 October the same year. On 10 November 2018, the couple announced that they were expecting their first child via Instagram. Their daughter Quinta Chan was born on 14 April 2019.

== Filmography ==
=== Television dramas ===
Title	Chinese title	Year	Role	Notes
Instinct	笑看風雲	1994	Peter	Episode 19
Happy Harmony	餐餐有宋家	1994	Nick	
Man of Wisdom II	金牙大狀（貳）	1995	Cheung Hok-sau	
Sharp Shooters	廉政英雌	1995	News reporter	
A Kindred Spirit	真情	1995	Eric	Episode 6
To Love With Love	水餃皇后	1995	Chu Tak-pak	15 episodes
Down Memory Lane	萬里長情	1995	Chi-hung	Episode 15
The Criminal Investigator	O記實錄	1995	Wu Sai-kit	Episode 15
The Condor Heroes 95	神鵰俠侶	1995	Sung Tak-fong	Episode 23
Stepping Stone	總有出頭天	1995	On	
File of Justice IV	壹號皇庭IV	1995	Frankie Fan	Episode 23
When a Man Loves a Woman	新同居關係	1995	Fong Sai-hoi	2 episodes (Eps. 10–11)
From Act to Act	娛樂插班生	1995	Peter	
A Good Match From Heaven	天降奇緣	1995	Fong Sai-wah	
Detective Investigation Files II	刑事偵緝檔案II	1995	Hair stylist	Episode 21
Cold Blood Warm Heart	天地男兒	1996	Rookie	
Mutual Affection	河東獅吼	1996	Scholar	
Outburst	900重案追兇	1996	Au Lik-keung	
Wars of Bribery	廉政行動組	1996	Ah Sei	
State of Divinity	笑傲江湖	1996	Lau Fei	
Nothing to Declare	緝私群英	1996	Yeung Sau-chuen	
The Price to Pay	五個醒覺的少年	1996	Hung	
Once Upon a Time in Shanghai	新上海灘	1996	Deputy commander	
ICAC Investigators 1996	廉政行動1996	1996	Chan Chin-man	
One Good Turn Deserves Another	地獄天使	1996	Lai Tin-wong	
Show Time Blues	樂壇插班生	1997	Program host	
Mystery Files	迷離檔案	1997	Lai Ka-leung	
Against the Blade of Honour	圓月彎刀	1997	Sing	
Justice Sung	狀王宋世傑	1997	Extra	
The Disappearance	隱形怪傑	1997	Chai	
Before Dawn	愛在暴風的日子	1998	Extra	
The Hitman Chronicles	大刺客	1998	Aisin Gioro Yin-to	
The New Adventures of Chor Lau-heung	新楚留香	2001	Wen Liangyu	8 episodes (#17-22, 24)
As You Wish	有求必應	2002	Kam Dor-bo	
Project Ji Xiang	吉祥任務	2002	Albert Yung Siu-lung	
Light of Million Hopes	萬家燈火	2003	Chiu Ko-hing	
Thunder Cops	[暴風型警	2003	Chan Sing-yau	
Son from the Past	子是故人來	2004	Lam Ying (youth)	
Love in a Miracle	愛在有情天	2004	Chong Ning	
My Date with a Vampire III	我和殭屍有個約會III之永恆國度	2004	Ho Yau-cau / Destiny	
Happy Family	喜有此理	2005	Tsan-po / Ho-nam	
The Blind Detective	盲俠金魚飛天豬	2006	Jian Tailang	Episodes 21-25
Legend of Fang De and Miao Cuihua	方德與苗翠花	2006	Tiger Lui	
Hong Kong Criminal Files	香港奇案實錄	2006	Kam Chin-yu	3 episodes (Eps. 16–18)
Concubines of the Qing Emperor	大清後宮	2006	Yu Tai	
Walled Village	大城小故事	2007	Chan Heung-ching	
Stupid Child	笨小孩	2007	Ko See-lam	Lead role
Hong Kong Ghostbusters	靈舍不同	2007	Lau Chi-pang	Lead role
The King of Snooker	桌球天王	2009	Yau Yat-kiu (youth)	
The Threshold of a Persona	ID精英	2009	Kelvin Mak Chi-hin	
Burning Flame III	烈火雄心3	2009	Kelvin Pang Chi-ban	9 episodes
Cupid Stupid	戀愛星求人	2010	Frankie Chung Kin Pong	
The Mysteries of Love	談情說案	2010	Ben Wong Chi-ban	2 episodes (Eps. 14–15)
Ghost Writer	蒲松齡	2010	Po Pak-ling	
When Lanes Merge	情越雙白線	2010	Tony Kwan Syu-yan	10 episodes
Every Move You Make	讀心神探	2010	Chiu Man-hoi	4 episodes (Eps. 16–20)
A Great Way to Care	仁心解碼	2011	Dr. Leo Fong Wing-chun	
Only You	Only You 只有您	2011	Ng Siu-hoi	4 episodes (Eps. 4–6, 27)
Grace Under Fire	女拳	2011	Lui Kong (youth)	Episode 4
Relic of an Emissary	洪武三十二	2011	Zhu Quan, the Prince of Ning	
The Other Truth	真相	2011	Keith Lau Sz-kit	1st Male Lead
Forensic Heroes III	法證先鋒III	2011	Jim Fong Sai-yau	10 episodes
No Good Either Way	衝呀！瘦薪兵團	2012	Alex Mo Nga-lik	1st Male Lead
Three Kingdoms RPG	回到三國	2012	Zhou Yu	8 episodes
Reality Check	心路GPS	2013	Summer Ha Yat-cheung	1st Male Lead
Slow Boat Home	情越海岸線	2013	Kevin Ching Lai-wing (Fit Wing)	2nd Male Lead
Brother's Keeper	巨輪	2013	Sam Kiu Tin-seng	1st Male Lead
Outbound Love	單戀雙城	2014	Luk Kung-tsz	1st Male Lead
Ruse of Engagement	叛逃	2014	Carson Chong Yau-ching	1st Male Lead
ICAC Investigators 2014	廉政行動2014	2014	Officer Kelvin Chan Kwok-yan	Episode 4: "Goal Tricks"
All That Is Bitter Is Sweet	大藥坊	2014	Ting Yat-yuen	1st Male Lead
Eye in the Sky	天眼	2015	Cheng Nik-hang	2nd Male Lead
Captain of Destiny	張保仔	2015	Man-ho, the Eleventh Prince / Bowie	1st Male Lead
ICAC Investigators 2016	廉政行動2016	2016	Officer Chan Kwok-yan (Batman Sir)	1st Male Lead
A Fist Within Four Walls	城寨英雄	2016	Chiu Yeung (Chor Au-kuen)/ Chiu Mang-san	1st Male Lead
Brother's Keeper II	巨輪II	2016	Sam Kiu Tin-seng	5 episodes
Burning Hands	乘勝狙擊	2017	Chak Koon-yat	1st Male Lead
The Unholy Alliance	同盟	2017	Ko Tsz-kit	1st Male Lead
Succession War	天命	2018	Heshen	1st Male Lead
Sinister Beings	逆天奇案	2021	SIP Hui Chun-sum (Sum Sir)	1st Male Lead
The Righteous Fists	鐵拳英雄	2022	Po Ching-wan (Ting Sam-ping) / Po Tin-ha	1st Male Lead
Childhood In A Capsule	童時愛上你	2022	Charlie Sheung Cha-lai	2nd Male Lead
My Mom, My Ping Pong	母親的乒乓球	2022	Kwok Yat	1st Male Lead
Against Darkness	黯夜守護者	2022	Sergeant Ko Fai	1st Male Lead
I’ve Got The Power	超能使者	2022	Chung Hau-nin	1st Male Lead
Mission Run	廉政狙擊·黑幕	2022	But Wing-hang	Guest Appearance
The Invisibles	隱形戰隊	2023	Hong Shing-tin	Special Appearance
Speakers of Law	法言人	2023	Taxi driver	Special Appearance
Secret Door	隱門	2023	Ray Chong Chi-kiu	1st Male Lead
From Hong Kong to Beijing	香港人在北京	2023	Tsui Kong-yan	1st Male Lead
Sinister Beings (Sr.2)	逆天奇案II	2024	SIP Hui Chun-sum (Sum Sir)	1st Male Lead
The Queen of Castle	巨塔之后	2025	Rex Tai Tak-kiu	1st Male Lead
War of the Roses	玫瑰戰爭	2026	Ho Kar-chun	3rd Male Lead

=== Film ===
Year	Title	Role	Notes
1995	Killer's Code		
1996	Big Bullet	Chiu Sai-wing	(aka E.U. Strike Force)
1996	Fifteen Candles	Nina	(aka They Don't Care About Us)
1996	Mongkok Story	Gump	
1997	Tough Guy	Chan Pang	
1997	Ghost Story "Godmother of Mongkok"	Brother Cup Noodle	
1998	Shanghai Affairs	Bond Lao	
1998	Rape Trap	Chan Chi-pang	
1999	Trust Me U Die	Kelvin	
1999	Oh! My Dad!	Chan Chi-pang	
1999	Evil Fade	Cheung Lok-ming	
2000	Diamond Hill	May's brother	
2000	Marooned	Sonny	
2000	Phantom Call		
2001	Ghost Office	Wong Yan-tung	
2002	Distinctive	Reporter	
2003	Fate Fighter	Cook	
2003	News Heart	CEO	
2016	Line Walker: The Movie	Tung Pak-ho	Cantonese voice over

== Discography ==
- 1998: Blue
- 1998: Chui Ho Kwan Hai (最好關係)
  - CD1, Track 9: "Wan Ha La" (玩吓啦)

=== Soundtrack appearances ===
Song	Year	TV drama	Album(s)	Notes
"Fated" (註定) (Cantonese version) (with Amy Chan)	2004	Love in a Miracle	aTV Drama Hits	Theme song
"Love In a Miracle" (愛在有情天) (Mandarin version) (with Amy Chan)	2004	Love in a Miracle	aTV Drama Hits	Theme song
"This Day, That Day" (這一天那一天)	2004	Love in a Miracle	aTV Drama Hits	
"Trust and Strength" (自信自強)	2004	The Chinese Medic Master	aTV Drama Hits	Theme song
"Happy Family" (喜有此理) (with ATV stars)	2005	Happy Family	aTV	Theme song
"If There is a Soulmate in This Lifetime" (如果這一生有知己)	2006	Hong Kong Criminal Files		
"Simple Love" (簡單愛) (Cantonese version) (with Calvin Li)	2007	Stupid Kid	aTV and ATV 50th Anniversary Classic Theme Songs	Theme song
"Three Beats Slower" (慢三拍) (Mandarin version) (with Calvin Li)	2007	Stupid Kid	ATV 50th Anniversary Classic Theme Songs	Theme song
"Know Each Other's Hearts" (心有靈犀) (with Elle Choi)	2007	Hong Kong Ghostbusters	Hao Ge 101 and ATV 50th Anniversary Classic Theme Songs	Theme song
"The More Courageous" (越愛越勇) (with Elle Choi)	2007	Hong Kong Ghostbusters	aTV and ATV 50th Anniversary Classic Theme Songs	
"Thin Salary Clan" (瘦薪族) (with Louis Yuen, Gill Mohindepaul Singh)	2012	No Good Either Way		Theme song
"Little Grass" (小草)	2013	Reality Check		Theme song
"Wheel of Time" (巨輪) (with Edwin Siu)	2013	Brother's Keeper		Theme song
"So Close" (差半步)	2014	Outbound Love	TV Love Songs Forever	
"Close Call" (千鈞一髮) (with Ron Ng)	2014	Ruse of Engagement		Ending theme
"Next Century" (下世紀)	2015	Captain of Destiny		Ending theme
"Siege" (圍城)	2016	A Fist Within Four Walls		Opening theme
"Never Know You are the Best" (從未知道你最好) (with Nancy Wu)	2016	A Fist Within Four Walls		Ending theme
"No One Can Change" (誰可改變)	2016	Brother's Keeper II		Theme song

=== Other appearances ===
Song	Year	Notes
"We are the Only One" (with TVB stars)	2014	2014 FIFA World Cup TVB theme song
"Ride the Wind" (乘風) (with TVB stars)	2016	2016 TVB Amazing Summer theme song

== Awards and nominations ==
=== TVB Anniversary Awards ===
Year	Nominee / work	Award	Result
2011	The Other Truth	Best Actor	Nominated
2011	The Other Truth	My Favourite Male Character	Top 5
2013	Brother's Keeper	Best Actor	Top 5
2013	Brother's Keeper	My Favourite Male Character	Nominated
2014	Ruse of Engagement	Best Actor	Top 5
2014	Outbound Love	My Favourite Male Character	Nominated
2014	"So Close" (Outbound Love OST)	Most Popular Drama Theme Song	Nominated
2014	"Nick of Time" (Ruse of Engagement OST)	Most Popular Drama Theme Song (with Ron Ng)	Nominated
2015	Captain of Destiny	Best Actor	Top 5
2015	Captain of Destiny	Most Popular Male Character	Won
2015	"Next Century" (Captain of Destiny OST)	Most Popular Drama Theme Song	Nominated
2016	A Fist Within Four Walls	Best Actor	Won
2016	A Fist Within Four Walls	Most Popular Male Character	Top 5
2016	A Fist Within Four Walls	Most Popular On-Screen Partnership (with Benjamin Yuen)	Nominated
2016	"Siege" (A Fist Within Four Walls OST)	Most Popular Drama Theme Song	Nominated
2016	"Never Know You Are the Best" (A Fist Within Four Walls OST)	Most Popular Drama Theme Song (with Nancy Wu)	Won
2016	"No One Can Change" (Brother's Keeper II OST)	Most Popular Drama Theme Song	Nominated
2017	The Unholy Alliance	Best Actor	Top 5
2017	The Unholy Alliance	Most Popular Male Character	Nominated
2017	The Unholy Alliance	"Trigger On" (The Unholy Alliance OST)	Nominated
2018	Succession War	Favourite Actor in Malaysia	Top 3
2018	Succession War	Favourite Actor in Singapore	Top 3
2018	Succession War	Best Actor	Nominated
2018	Succession War	Most Popular Male Character	Nominated
2018	Succession War	"Remorse" (Succession War OST)	Nominated
2021	Sinister Beings	Best Actor	Top 5
2021	Sinister Beings	Most Popular Male Character	Nominated
2021	Sinister Beings	Favourite Actor in Malaysia	Top 5
2021	Sinister Beings	Most Popular Onscreen Partnership (with Rosina Lam)	Top 10
2022	The Righteous Fists	Best Actor	Nominated
2022	My Mom, My Ping Pong	Best Actor	Nominated
2022	Against Darkness	Best Actor	Nominated
2022	I’ve Got The Power	Best Actor	Top 5
2022	The Righteous Fists	Most Popular Male Character	Nominated
2022	My Mom, My Ping Pong	Most Popular Male Character	Nominated
2022	Against Darkness	Most Popular Male Character	Nominated
2022	I’ve Got The Power	Most Popular Male Character	Top 10
2022	The Righteous Fists	Favourite TVB Actor in Malaysia	Top 10
2022	My Mom, My Ping Pong	Favourite TVB Actor in Malaysia	Nominated
2022	Against Darkness	Favourite TVB Actor in Malaysia	Nominated
2022	I’ve Got The Power	Favourite TVB Actor in Malaysia	Won
2022	I’ve Got The Power	Most Popular Onscreen Partnership (with Natalie Tong, Joel Chan, Tiffany Lau, Jazz Lam)	Top 10
2022	"Same Way" (The Righteous Fists OST)	Most Popular Drama Theme Song	Nominated
2023	Secret Door	Best Actor	Nominated
2023	From Hong Kong to Beijing	Best Actor	Top 5
2023	From Hong Kong to Beijing	Favourite TVB Actor in Greater Bay Area	Top 5
2023	Secret Door	Favourite TVB Actor in Malaysia	Nominated
2023	From Hong Kong to Beijing	Favourite TVB Actor in Malaysia	Nominated

=== My AOD Favourites Awards ===
Year	Nominee / work	Award	Result
2011	The Other Truth	My Favourite Actor	Top 5
2011	The Other Truth	My Top 15 Favourite Drama Characters	Won
2012	No Good Either Way	My Favourite Actor	Nominated
2012	No Good Either Way	My Top 15 Favourite Drama Characters	Won
2012	No Good Either Way	My Favourite Onscreen Couple (with Kristal Tin)	Nominated

=== TVB Star Awards Malaysia ===
Year	Nominee / work	Award	Result
2013	Brother's Keeper	Favourite TVB Actor	Top 5
2013	Brother's Keeper	Top 15 Favourite TVB Characters	Won
2013	Brother's Keeper	Favourite TVB Onscreen Couple (with Linda Chung)	Top 5
2014	Outbound Love	Favourite TVB Actor	Top 3
2014	Outbound Love	Top 15 Favourite TVB Characters	Won
2014	Outbound Love	Favourite TVB Onscreen Couple (with Aimee Chan)	Won
2015	Captain of Destiny	Favourite TVB Actor	Won
2015	Captain of Destiny	Top 16 Favourite TVB Characters	Won
2015	Captain of Destiny	Favourite TVB Onscreen Couple (with Grace Chan)	Top 3
2016	A Fist Within Four Walls	Favourite TVB Actor	Won
2016	A Fist Within Four Walls	Top 15 Favourite TVB Characters	Won
2016	A Fist Within Four Walls	Favourite TVB Onscreen Couple (with Nancy Wu)	Won
2016	"Never Know You Are the Best" (A Fist Within Four Walls OST)	Favourite TVB Drama Theme Song (with Nancy Wu)	Won
2017	The Unholy Alliance	Favourite TVB Actor	Top 3
2017	The Unholy Alliance	Top 17 Favourite TVB Characters	Won
2017	The Unholy Alliance	Favourite TVB Onscreen Couple (with Nancy Wu)	Won

=== StarHub TVB Awards ===
Year	Nominee / work	Award	Result
2012	The Other Truth	My Favourite TVB Actor	Nominated
2012	The Other Truth	My Favourite TVB Male TV Characters	Nominated
2012	The Other Truth	My Favourite TVB New Male Artiste	Won
2013	Slow Boat Home	My Favourite TVB Actor	Nominated
2013	Slow Boat Home	My Favourite TVB Male TV Characters	Won
2013	"Little Grass" (Reality Check OST)	My Favourite Drama Theme Song	Nominated
2014	Ruse of Engagement	My Favourite TVB Actor	Won
2014	Brother's Keeper	My Favourite TVB Male TV Characters	Won
2014	"Wheel of Time" (Brother's Keeper OST)	My Favourite TVB Theme Song (with Edwin Siu)	Nominated
2015	Captain of Destiny	My Favourite TVB Actor	Won
2015	Captain of Destiny	My Favourite TVB Male TV Characters	Nominated
2016	A Fist Within Four Walls	My Favourite TVB Actor	Won
2016	A Fist Within Four Walls	My Favourite TVB Male TV Characters	Nominated
2016	A Fist Within Four Walls	My Favourite TVB Onscreen Couple (with Nancy Wu)	Won
2016	"Siege" (A Fist Within Four Walls OST)	My Favourite TVB Theme Song	Nominated
2016	"Never Know You Are the Best" (A Fist Within Four Walls OST)	Favourite TVB Theme Song (with Nancy Wu)	Won
2016	"No One Can Change" (Brother's Keeper II OST)	My Favourite TVB Theme Song	Nominated
2017	The Unholy Alliance	My Favourite TVB Actor	Nominated
2017	The Unholy Alliance	My Favourite TVB Male TV Characters	Won
2017	The Unholy Alliance	My Favourite TVB Onscreen Couple (with Nancy Wu)	Nominated

=== Weibo Stars Awards ===
Year	Nominee / work	Award	Result
2014	Brother's Keeper	Weibo's Most Brilliant Male TV Character	Nominated
2014	Brother's Keeper	Weibo's Most Brilliant TV Drama	Nominated
2015	Ruse of Engagement	Weibo's Most Brilliant Male TV Character	Won
2015	Ruse of Engagement	Weibo's Most Brilliant TV Drama	Nominated
2015	Ruse of Engagement	Weibo's Most Brilliant On-Screen Couple (with Aimee Chan)	Nominated
2015	All That is Bitter is Sweet	Weibo's Most Brilliant On-Screen Couple (with Linda Chung)	Nominated
2016	Captain of Destiny	Weibo's Most Brilliant Male TV Character	Won
2016	Captain of Destiny	Weibo's Most Brilliant TV Drama	Nominated
2016	Captain of Destiny	Weibo's Most Brilliant CP (with Grace Chan)	Nominated
2016	Eye in the Sky	Weibo's Most Brilliant TV Drama	Won

=== Jade Solid Gold Music Awards ===
Year	Nominee / work	Award	Result
2016	"No One Can Change" (Brother's Keeper II OST)	Gold Song Award	Won
2016	"Never Know You Are the Best" (A Fist Within Four Walls OST)	Gold Song Award	Won
2016	"Never Know You Are the Best" (A Fist Within Four Walls OST)	Best Duet (Gold) (with Nancy Wu)	Won

=== Others ===
- 2012 Singapore Entertainment Awards—Most Popular Hong Kong TV Actor
- 2013 Singapore Entertainment Awards—Most Popular Hong Kong TV Actor
- 2014 Singapore Entertainment Awards—Most Popular Hong Kong TV Actor
- 2015 Yahoo! Asia Buzz Awards—Most Searched Male TV Artiste
- 2016 McMillan Woods Global Awards—Asia Pacific Best Male Actor
- 2016 Yahoo! Asia Buzz Awards—Most Popular Male TV Artiste
- 2016 Yahoo! Asia Buzz Awards—Most Popular TV Drama Duet (with Nancy Wu)
