= Jazz Boon =

Hong Kong television producer

- 文偉鴻
- Born: Man Wai-hung; 25 September 1966 (age 59); Yau Tsim Mong District, Kowloon, Hong Kong
- Occupations: Television Producer; Director; Writer
- Years active: 1990s–present

Man Wai-hung, known professionally as Jazz Boon (born 25 September 1966), is a Hong Kong television producer, director, and writer. His professional TV career started in the early 1990s, when he was hired by TVB as a production assistant. His first drama as director was the 1995 police procedural Invincible Vanguard. He was promoted to producer in 2012.

Boon's television dramas have received commercial and critical acclaim. His credits include Bounty Lady, the Line Walker series, and A Fist Within Four Walls.

== Filmography ==
=== Drama series ===
Year	Title	Chinese title	Notes	Avg. rating	HK viewers
2012	Friendly Fire	法網狙擊	Producer, Director	28	1.82 million
2013	Bounty Lady	My盛Lady	Producer, Director; TVB Anniversary Award for Best Actor (Dayo Wong); TVB Anniversary Award for Best Supporting Actor (Hui Shiu-Hung)	28	1.83 million
2014	Line Walker	使徒行者	Producer, Director; TVB Anniversary Award for Best Drama; TVB Anniversary Award for Best Actress (Charmaine Sheh); TVB Anniversary Award for Most Popular Female Character (Charmaine Sheh); TVB Anniversary Award for Most Popular Male Character (Hui Shiu-Hung); TVB Anniversary Award for Most Popular Drama Theme Song (Jinny Ng) TVB Star Award for My Favourite TVB Drama; TVB Star Award for My Favourite TVB Actress (Charmaine Sheh); TVB Star Award for My Favourite Supporting Actor (Hui Shiu-Hung); TVB Star Award for My Favourite TVB Supporting Actress (Sharon Chan); TVB Star Award for My Favourite TVB Drama Theme Song (Jinny Ng) StarHub TVB Award for My Favourite TVB Actress (Charmaine Sheh) Huading Award for Best Chinese Actor in a TV Series (Raymond Lam); Huading Award for Best Chinese Actress in a TV Series (Charmaine Sheh)	30.5	1.97 million
2016	Come with Me	性在有情	Producer, Director		
2016	A Fist Within Four Walls	城寨英雄	Producer, Director; TVB Anniversary Award for Best Drama; TVB Anniversary Award for Best Actor (Ruco Chan); TVB Anniversary Award for Best Actress (Nancy Wu); TVB Anniversary Award for Most Popular Male Character (Benjamin Yuen); TVB Anniversary Award for Most Popular Female Character (Grace Wong); TVB Anniversary Award for Most Popular Drama Theme Song (Ruco Chan & Nancy Wu) TVB Star Award for My Favourite TVB Drama; TVB Star Award for My Favourite TVB Actor (Ruco Chan); TVB Star Award for My Favourite TVB Actress (Nancy Wu); TVB Star Award for My Favourite TVB Drama Theme Song (Chan, Wu); TVB Star Award for My Favourite TVB On-Screen Couple (Ruco Chan & Nancy Wu) StarHub TVB Award for My Favourite TVB Drama; StarHub TVB Award for My Favourite TVB Actor (Ruco Chan); StarHub TVB Award for My Favourite TVB Actress (Nancy Wu); StarHub TVB Award for My Favourite TVB Drama Theme Song (Ruco Chan & Nancy Wu); StarHub TVB Award for My Favourite TVB On-Screen Couple (Ruco Chan & Nancy Wu, Benjamin Yuen & Grace Wong)	30.7	1.99 million
2017	The Unholy Alliance	同盟	Producer, Director	28.7	1.86 million
2022	I've Got The Power	超能使者	Producer		
2022	The Righteous Fists	鐵拳英雄	Producer		
2023	The Invisibles	隱形戰隊	Producer		

=== Theatrical releases ===
Year	Title	Chinese title	Notes	Box office
2016	Line Walker	使徒行者	Director	CN¥606.2 million (China)
2019	Line Walker 2: Invisible Spy	使徒行者2：諜影行動	Director	
