= Love Exchange =

- Love Exchange poster
- 疑情別戀
- Genre: Modern Thriller
- Starring: Michael Miu; Anita Yuen; Kristal Tin; Power Chan
- Opening theme: "距離" by Kary Ng
- Country of origin: Hong Kong
- Original language: Cantonese
- No. of episodes: 20

Production
- Running time: 45 minutes (approx.)

Original release
- Network: TVB
- Release: July 7 – July 28, 2008

Love Exchange (Traditional Chinese: 疑情別戀) is a TVB modern thriller series that broadcast in July 2008.

== Synopsis ==
When romance is dead,
Everything turns terrible and destructive.

A man and a woman are found dead inside a car. Zita Sit Chi-Yiu (Anita Yuen) learns that the man is her husband, Dick Ling Ho-Leung (Eddie Kwan), and the woman is called Bonnie Fong Cheuk-Ling (Angela Tong). While Zita is devastated by her husband's death, she is also heartbroken to come to know that he had an affair. Mike Yiu Lap-Tin (Michael Miu), a friend of Dick from school, shows up out of the blue and he cares a great deal about her. Later, Zita discovers that Mike, who works for a security firm, is in fact Bonnie's husband and that he is not a friend of Dick in the least.

The death of Dick also left Zita without a source of income. But Dick's boss, Anson Tsu Yeuk-Yue (Power Chan) has found Zita a job at the insurance company they work at. Although her supervisor, Jackie Ching Ngo-Yee (Crystal Tin), means to make things difficult for her, Zita takes it all. This makes Jackie change her view on Zita and the two have become good friends. Zita wants to get over her pain and stand on her own two feet but Mike is determined to find out about the truth of Dick and Bonnie's deaths. Zita has no choice but to give him a hand. However, the deeper they dig into the case, the more mysterious they find it. Zita cannot even judge who is friend and who is foe.

== Cast ==
Cast	Role	Description
Anita Yuen	Sit Chi-Yiu (Zita) 薛子瑤	Insurance Agent; Ling Ho-Leung's wife. Yiu Lap-Tin's friend.
Michael Miu	Yiu Lap-Tin (Mike) 饒立天	Bodyguard; Fong Cheuk-Ling's husband. Sit Chi-Yiu's friend. Tsui Yeuk-Yue's childhood friend.
Power Chan	Tsui Yeuk-Yue (Anson) 徐若愚	Insurance Agent/Manager; Tung Sze-Ting's husband. Ching Ngo-Yee's lover.
Kristal Tin (田蕊妮)	Ching Ngo-Yee (Jackie) 程傲兒	Insurance Agent/Supervisor; Tsui Yeuk-Yue's mistress.
Eddie Kwan	Ling Ho-Leung (Dick) 凌浩良	Insurance Agent/Supervisor; Sit Chi-Yiu's deceased husband.
Angela Tong	Fong Cheuk-Ling (Bonnie) 方卓玲	Yiu Lap-Tin's deceased wife. Fong Zhuo-Ying's older sister.
Angel Chiang	Fong Zhuo-Ying (Ying-Ying) 方卓盈	Fong Cheuk-Ling's younger sister.
Tracy Ip	Tung Sze-Ting (Sophie) 董詩婷	Teacher; Tsui Yeuk-Yue's wife.
Mandy Cho	Sheh Siu-Lung (Nikita) 佘小龍	Bodyguard; Yiu Lap-Tin's admirer.
Li Ka-Sing (李家聲)	Sze Lai-Wai 施乃威	Bodyguard
Wilson Tsui (艾威)	Kam Sam 金森	C.I.D. Yiu Lap-Tin's friend.
Angelia Lo (盧宛茵)	Yip Lai-Chu 葉麗珠	Ling Ho-Leung and Ling Ho-Gei's mother.
Alex Lam (林子善)	Ling Ho-Gei 凌浩基	Ling Ho-Leung's brother.
Law Lok Lam (羅樂林)	Ling Siu-Ming 凌兆銘	Ling Ho-Leung and Ling Ho-Gei's father
Oscar Leung (梁競徽	Yuen Siu Kwun 袁小軍	Kidnapper in episode 9 and 10 to avenge for his dad. He kidnapped Zita and Sze Lai-Wai's son.

== Viewership ratings ==
	Week	Episode	Average Points	Peaking Points	References
1	June 30 - July 4, 2008	1 — 5	28	30	
2	July 7–11, 2008	6 — 10	31	—	
3	July 14–18, 2008	11 — 15	32	34	
4	July 21–25, 2008	16 — 20	32	35	

== Awards and nominations ==
41st TVB Anniversary Awards (2008)

- "Best Drama"
- "Best Actor in a Leading Role" (Michael Miu - Mike Yiu Lap-Tin)
- "Best Actress in a Supporting Role" (Crystal Tin - Jackie Ching Ngo-Yee)
