= A Fist Within Four Walls =

2016 Hong Kong martial arts action TV drama

- Official poster
- Chinese: 城寨英雄
- Literal meaning: Heroes of the Walled City
- Hanyu Pinyin: chéng zhài yīng xióng
- Jyutping: sing4 zaai6 jing1 hung4
- Genre: Period drama Martial arts Action
- Created by: Jazz Boon
- Written by: Yip Tin-shing; Steffie Lai
- Directed by: Chong Kwok-keung; Hui Shui-ping; Lam Chi-lung
- Starring: Ruco Chan; Nancy Wu; Benjamin Yuen; Carlo Ng; Philip Ng; Yuen Qiu; Lam Tsz-sin; Grace Wong; Moon Lau
- Theme music composer: Alan Cheung
- Opening theme: "Siege" (圍城) by Ruco Chan
- Ending theme: "Never Know You Are the Best" (從未知道你最好) by Ruco Chan and Nancy Wu
- Composer: Alan Cheung
- Country of origin: Hong Kong
- Original language: Cantonese
- No. of episodes: 28

Production
- Executive producer: Jazz Boon
- Producer: Jazz Boon
- Editors: Yip Tin-shing; Steffie Lai
- Running time: 45 minutes
- Production company: TVB

Original release
- Network: TVB Jade
- Release: 1 August – 28 August 2016

A Fist Within Four Walls
- Chinese: 城寨英雄
- Cantonese Yale: Sìngjaaih Yīnghùng
- Literal meaning: "walled city heroes"
Transcriptions
Standard Mandarin
- Hanyu Pinyin: Chéngzhài Yīngxióng
- Bopomofo: ㄔㄥˊㄓㄞˋ ㄧㄥ ㄒㄩㄥˊ
Yue: Cantonese
- Yale Romanization: Sìngjaaih Yīnghùng
- Jyutping: Sing4zaai6 Jing1hung4
- IPA: [sḙːŋ.tsàːi jéːŋ.ho̭ŋ]

A Fist Within Four Walls (Chinese: 城寨英雄; Cantonese Yale: Sìngjaaih Yīnghùng) is a 2016 Hong Kong martial arts action television drama produced by Jazz Boon and TVB. It premiered on TVB Jade in Hong Kong, Astro On Demand in Malaysia and TVB First in Singapore on 1 August 2016. The final episode aired on 28 August 2016, totalling 28 episodes.

A Fist Within Four Walls takes place in the triad-ridden Kowloon Walled City in the early 1960s. The plot revolves around Chor Au-kuen, a gifted martial arts novice who takes on the duty of protecting the walled city against evildoers. A Fist Within Four Walls is the highest-rated drama of 2016, and its final episode was the second most-watched series finale of the year in Hong Kong. It received generally positive reviews during its broadcast.

The drama received multiple awards and nominations at the StarHub TVB Awards and the TVB Star Awards in Malaysia, winning Favourite Drama, Favourite Actor (Ruco Chan), and Favourite Actress (Nancy Wu) at both ceremonies. It won six awards at the TVB Anniversary Awards, including Best Drama, Best Actor (Ruco Chan), Best Actress (Nancy Wu), Most Popular Male Character (Benjamin Yuen), Most Popular Female Character (Grace Wong), and Most Popular Drama Theme Song ("Never Know You Are the Best").

== Premise ==
A Fist Within Four Walls is characterised as a kung fu drama with frequent comic relief. It takes inspiration from Hong Kong manhua and martial arts films. The story mainly takes place in the Kowloon Walled City during the early 1960s, when a majority of the city was virtually ruled by Hong Kong triads. The walled city was a largely ungoverned settlement at the time, with high rates of gambling, prostitution, and drug use, earning the name "Three Lawless Zone" (三不管; saam1 bat1 gun2).

=== Plot ===
In 1945, Bajiquan masters Duen Tung-tin and Chiu Mang-san form a brief alliance to protect the once-peaceful Kowloon Walled City from falling into the hands of ruthless gangs. The alliance breaks when Duen is poisoned and beaten to death by a mysterious assailant, and Chiu is suspected to be the killer. Chiu allegedly commits suicide, his children separate, and the walled city falls under the control of triads.

Fifteen years later, Chiu's now adult son Chor Au-kuen returns to the walled city to find his long-lost sister. Concealing his true identity, he gets acquainted with Tiu Lan, the lady boss of a local hair salon, and finds a job as a water labourer so he can pay his rent. By chance, Kuen meets the dentist Duen Ying-fung, the only son of Duen, and finds that the Duen family has now closed down their Bajiquan kwoon to start a dental clinic. Fung is skilled in Bajiquan but only trains it in secret, as he does not want to be seen as a threat against the city's leading triad organisation, The Fellow Association.

To protect the city's people against the growing power of The Fellow Association, Kuen and Fung recruit other kung fu practitioners to form the Kowloon Walled City Welfare Association. Though naturally gifted in martial arts, Kuen refuses to learn Bajiquan from Fung, as he believes that his father's Tiger Climbing Mountain fist to be the strike that had killed Fung's father fifteen years ago. Instead, Kuen takes up the mentorship of store owner Yuk Bo-fung, a retired kung fu master, and learns mixed styles of Muay Thai and Wing Chun. Her son Lung Shing-fu, the right-hand man of Fellow Association leader Or Man-cheung, finds his loyalties divided.

A leader of The Fellow Association mysteriously dies under the hands of a Bajiquan master, and Fung becomes the number one suspect. Kuen and Fung investigate, and the case leads them straight to Fa Man, the leader of a stripping dance troupe. As the drama progresses, more mysteries behind the deaths of Chiu and Duen begin to unravel. Kuen finds that The Fellow Association is not the only society that is plaguing the walled city with evil.

== Cast and characters ==
- Ruco Chan as Chor Au-kuen (左勾拳; zo2 ngau1 kyun4):

Known as Kuen Lo (拳佬; "Fist Guy"), the main protagonist. Kuen is a water labourer who possesses impressive physical strength and is naturally gifted in martial arts. He was born Chiu Yeung (朝陽; ziu1 joeng4) and was the son of Chiu Mang-san, a Bajiquan master from the walled city. When his father was accused of a crime and later killed, 10-year-old Kuen escaped the walled city to Macau to live with his great-aunt. Fifteen years later, he returns to the walled city in hopes of finding his long-lost sister. He gets acquainted with several martial artists within the city and takes up the mentorship of Yuk Bo-fung, a master in Muay Thai and Wing Chun. Bearing the guilt of his father's crime, Kuen refuses to re-learn Bajiquan, but soon discovers that his father's death was not as everyone believed it to be. As the drama progresses, Kuen gains the skills necessary to take on The Fellow Association, the city's leading triad organisation, and forms the Walled City Welfare Association to protect the people against them. Kuen is cheerful and kind-hearted, but can be at times too naïve and impulsive. Yeung Hoi-pok portrayed 10-year-old Chor Au-kuen.

- Nancy Wu as Tiu Lan (刁蘭; diu1 laan4):

Kuen's feisty and bossy landlady who owns a hair salon in the walled city and has a crush on Fung. Though stingy and at times overbearing, she is innately honourable with a strong sense of justice. Tiu Lan has a mysterious past, and has demonstrated on several occasions that she is an extremely skilled mixed martial artist, with a fondness for knives. Viann Ngai portrayed 10-year-old Tiu Lan.

- Benjamin Yuen as Duen Ying-fung (段迎風; dyun6 jing4 fung1):

Known as Ngah Lo (牙佬; "Tooth Guy"), Kuen's occasional rival and the successor of the Duen Family Bajiquan. Fung was the only son of Duen Tung-tin, an influential Bajiquan master and protector of the walled city. When Fung was 10, his father was beaten to death by a mysterious assailant, and his family was forced to close down their Bajiquan kwoon due to the growing intimidation of triads. Fung's uncle warns him to keep his Bajiquan abilities low-profile so he would not fall into the same fate as his father. Fung is introduced at the start of the drama as a local dentist who trains in secret. After meeting Kuen, Fung realises the importance of his skill and co-forms the Walled City Welfare Association to protect the walled city against The Fellow Association. Fung is logical, levelheaded, and has a very calm and collected style of fighting. He is the stark contrast to Kuen's brute strength. Alvin Lau portrayed 10-year-old Duen Ying-fung.

- Carlo Ng as Fung Chun-mei (馮春美; fung4 ceon1 mei5):

One of the leading figures of The Fellow Association. He controls most of the city's prostitute houses and performance clubs. A rough childhood turned him into a heartless, cruel, and a little twisted in the mind, but he remains extremely protective of his younger brother, Fung Ha-moon. His feminine appearance and demeanor hides his true persona of a ruthless, cruel and sadistic triad boss. He is a master in the Eagle Claw.

- Philip Ng as Lung Shing-fu (龍成虎; lung4 sing4 fu2):

Kuen and Fung's rival. He is a highly skilled Muay Thai fighter and has never lost a fight in the ring. Fu is the only son of Yuk Bo-fung, a retired kung fu master from Thailand. To keep his mother safe, Fu joins The Fellow Association and becomes Or Man-cheung's right-hand man. His mother is highly against this decision, and they enter an estranged relationship. Fu is extremely filial, protective, and would go to extreme lengths to protect his mother, even if he has to betray The Fellow Association.

- Yuen Qiu as Yuk Bo-fung (玉波鳳; juk6 bo1 fung2):

Known as Thai Por (泰婆; "Thai Lady"), Kuen's mentor. She is a retired Wing Chun and Muay Thai master from Mainland China, but moved to Thailand to start her family. After her husband's death, she brings her only son, Lung Shing-fu, to Hong Kong and settles in the walled city. She disapproves of her son's involvement with The Fellow Association, but would do anything to protect him. Thai Por owns a mini store across the street from Tiu Lan's hair salon, and the two often compete for customers.

- Lam Tsz-sin as But Tak-liu (畢得了; bat1 dak1 liu5):

Kuen's roommate and one of Tiu Lan's tenants. He works as a general contractor and was the first person to bring Kuen into the walled city.

- Grace Wong as Fa Man (花曼; faa1 maan4):

The mysterious leader of a striptease dance troupe. Fa Man is a powerful Bajiquan fighter, and was hired by Fung Chun-mei to cause unrest between Or Man-cheung and Fuk Sau-kam. Hedia Yeung portrayed 9-year-old Fa Man.

- Moon Lau as Or Tak-li (柯德莉; o1 dak1 lei4):

Also known as Audrey, the daughter of Or Man-cheung. She has just returned to Hong Kong after graduating university from abroad. Rebellious and fascinated with the culture of the walled city, she takes up a teaching post at the city's local public elementary school and becomes acquainted with Kuen, who she starts to fancy. She is generous and sympathetic, but is also quite mischievous.

- KK Cheung as Or Man-cheung (柯萬長; o1 maan6 coeng4):

A Hong Kong business tycoon and a leading figure of The Fellow Association, and controls most of the gambling operations within the walled city, including the city's biggest underground fighting ring. He is a hidden master in Tai Chi, and fights with a weaponised umbrella.

- Vincent Lam as Fuk Sau-kam (福壽金; fuk1 sau6 gam1):

One of the leading figures of The Fellow Association. He controls most of the city's drug rings, and is also a drug addict himself. He is a master in the Piguaquan, and takes medication to neutralise his sensitivity to pain. Fuk Sau-kam has a sadistic mind, and takes joy in torturing others for his entertainment.

- Oscar Li as Fung Ha-moon (馮夏滿; fung4 haa6 mun5):

Fung Chun-mei's younger brother who co-rules his prostitution empire. He is a notorious pervert that rapes all the new girls sold into prostitution. Fung Ha-moon is a skilled wrestler, a stark contrast to his brother's stylistic Eagle Claw.

- Jimmy Au as Yeung Chuk-luen (楊竹鑾; wong4 siu2 zi3):

The honest owner of a put chai ko (缽仔糕) factory who helps the walled city citizens as much as possible, while smuggling drugs for Fuk Sau-kam to protect his employees.

== Production ==
=== Development and filming ===
On 15 April 2015, TVB and producer Jazz Boon announced the development of A Fist Within Four Walls after casting martial arts star and action choreographer, Philip Ng. Ng negotiated with TVB for three months before agreeing to star. The series would revolve around a group of martial artists living in the Kowloon Walled City, an ungoverned former enclave in Hong Kong. Him Law and Sammy Sum were subsequently announced to star, with Law attached to a villain role. Benjamin Yuen and Moon Lau joined the cast a week later, but Law and Sum dropped out and was replaced by Ruco Chan and Benjamin Yuen, respectively. The cast was finalised in July 2015 with the addition of Ruco Chan, Nancy Wu, Yuen Qiu, and Grace Wong. Philip Kwok was hired as the series action director and choreographer.

On 14 August, the cast of A Fist Within Four Walls attended an open wushu training course and were interviewed by the press. A blessing ceremony for the drama was held on 28 August, a week after shooting began. Principal photography lasted until the third week of November.

== Soundtrack ==
Track listing

No.	Title	Lyrics	Music	Singer(s)	Length
1.	"Siege" (圍城)	Yeung Hei	Alan Cheung	Ruco Chan	3:05
2.	"Never Know You Are the Best" (從未知道你最好)	Sandy Chan	Alan Cheung	Ruco Chan, Nancy Wu	4:14

== Reception ==
TVB's 2016 calendar, month of November.

On 6 November 2015, TVB released its 2016 calendar, which has a promotional image of A Fist Within Four Walls attached to the month of November 2016. The first trailer for the drama was presented at the 2016 TVB Sales Presentation on 10 November 2015. A Fist Within Four Walls was the last TVB drama presented at the Hong Kong FILMART in March 2016.

On 26 July, a week before the drama's premiere, Hong Kong manhua author Yu Yee accused A Fist Within Four Walls of plagiarism, claiming that parts of the character design in Fung Chun-mei (portrayed by Carlo Ng) came from a character in his manhua City of Darkness, a story that also takes place in the Kowloon Walled City. He also claimed that "Typhoon", the assumed nickname of KK Cheung's role Or Man-cheung, is an exact copy of another character in his manhua. TVB has denied all accusations. Producer Jazz Boon responded by saying that the characterisation of Fung Chun-mei is actually inspired by Dongfang Bubai, the famous villain in the popular wuxia novel The Smiling, Proud Wanderer by Jin Yong. He also clarified that "Typhoon" is not the nickname of KK Cheung's character, but added that the name "Typhoon" is a "very typical and popular" name in fiction.

=== Broadcast ===
A Fist Within Four Walls premiered on 1 August 2016, as part of TVB's Amazing Summer program line-up. It is also broadcast by Astro On Demand in Malaysia, StarHub's TVB First in Singapore, and premiered it on the same time as Hong Kong.

In Hong Kong, the first episode received an average rating of 30 TVRs (TV ratings) and peaked at 31 TVRs, reaching over 2 million viewers. It was the most-watched Hong Kong drama debut since Ruse of Engagement in 2014. It finished the week with an average viewership rating of 26.7 TVRs, the highest-rated premiere week for 2016. One complaint was submitted to TVB and Hong Kong's Broadcast Authority, deploring the drama's violence.

The series finale, aired on 28 August 2016, was the second most-watched finale of the year, averaging 32.9 TVRs. It peaked to 35.2 TVRs, drawing in 2.28 million viewers. TVB and Hong Kong's Broadcast Authority received six complaints after the finale's broadcast. Four letters criticised the ending for having character deaths, while two complained about the drama being too gory and violent. The authorities did, however, receive two letters praising the cast's performance.

A Fist Within Four Walls is the highest-rated Hong Kong television drama of 2016, averaging 30.7 TVRs per episode.

=== Critical response ===
The critical reception for A Fist Within Four Walls has been generally positive. On Douban, a Chinese media database, the drama received a rating of 8.1 out of 10 based on 5,000 votes.

Most of the critical praises were directed towards the drama's writing, cast, and fight choreography. Hong Kong filmmaker Patrick Kong gave the first five episodes a positive review, calling it one of TVB's "most chase-worthy drama in recent years." He applauded the drama's compelling story-telling and its well-directed fight choreography. Online critics praised the drama's humor, action-packed story and well-written characters but criticised the predictable plot and the overuse of slow motion shots during the fight scenes. Several critics noted the cultural elements of the drama, and interpreted them to be a social commentary on Hong Kong's current political situation.

The last episode received mixed reviews. Lam Tung-yin of HK01 said the last episode was ridden with clichés, corny twists, and that the final villain was given an anticlimactic and lazy ending.

== Viewership ratings ==
The following is a table that includes a list of the total TVRs (rating points) based on television viewership. "Viewers in millions" refers to the number of people, derived from TVB Jade ratings, in Hong Kong who watched the episode live.

#	Timeslot (HKT)	Air date(s)	Episode(s)	Avg.	Peak	HK Viewers (in millions)	Ref.
1	Mon – Fri, 9:30 pm	1 – 5 August 2016	1 — 5	26.7	31	1.73	
1	Sat, 9:30 pm	6 August 2016	6	—	31	—	
1	Sun, 10:00 pm	7 August 2016	7	—	31	—	
2	Mon – Fri, 9:30 pm	8 – 12 August 2016	8 — 12	27.5	31.3	1.78	
2	Sat, 9:30 pm	13 August 2016	13	—	31.3	—	
2	Sun, 10:00pm	14 August 2016	14	25	31.3	1.62	
3	Mon – Fri, 9:30 pm	15 – 19 August 2016	15 — 19	27.5	—	1.78	
3	Sat, 9:30 pm	20 August 2016	20	19.8	—	1.28	
3	Sun, 9:30 pm	21 August 2016	21	28.1	—	1.82	
4	Mon – Fri, 9:30 pm	22 – 26 August 2016	22 — 26	30.5	35.2	1.97	
4	Sat, 9:30 pm	27 August 2016	27	28.4	35.2	1.84	
4	Sun, 9:30 pm	28 August 2016	28	32.9	35.2	2.13	
Total average				27.2 / 30.7^{[A]}	35.2	1.76 / 1.99	

- A According to Nielsen ratings, A Fist Within Four Walls averaged 27.2 TVRs per episode in live TV viewership. With online viewership included, the drama averaged 30.7 TVRs per episode.

== Future ==
The cast has expressed interest in returning for a film sequel, should there be one. Boon said doing a sequel "is possible", but it would happen only after he completes his priority projects.

== Accolades ==
Ceremony	Category	Recipients and nominees	Result	Note
StarHub TVB Awards	My Favourite TVB Drama	A Fist Within Four Walls	Won	
StarHub TVB Awards	My Favourite TVB Actress	Nancy Wu	Won	
StarHub TVB Awards	My Favourite TVB Actor	Ruco Chan	Won	
StarHub TVB Awards	My Favourite TVB Actor	Benjamin Yuen	Nominated	
StarHub TVB Awards	My Favourite TVB Supporting Actress	Grace Wong	Nominated	
StarHub TVB Awards	My Favourite TVB Supporting Actress	Yuen Qiu	Nominated	
StarHub TVB Awards	My Favourite TVB Supporting Actor	Philip Ng	Nominated	
StarHub TVB Awards	My Favourite TVB Female TV Character	Nancy Wu	Nominated	
StarHub TVB Awards	My Favourite TVB Female TV Character	Grace Wong	Won	
StarHub TVB Awards	My Favourite TVB Male TV Character	Ruco Chan	Nominated	
StarHub TVB Awards	My Favourite TVB Male TV Character	Benjamin Yuen	Won	
StarHub TVB Awards	My Favourite On-Screen Couple	Ruco Chan and Nancy Wu	Won	
StarHub TVB Awards	My Favourite On-Screen Couple	Benjamin Yuen and Grace Wong	Won	
StarHub TVB Awards	My Favourite TVB Theme Song	"Siege"	Nominated	
StarHub TVB Awards	My Favourite TVB Theme Song	"Never Know You Are the Best"	Won	
StarHub TVB Awards	Best New TVB Artist	Moon Lau	Won	
2016 TVB Star Awards Malaysia	My Favourite TVB Drama	A Fist Within Four Walls	Won	Top 3
2016 TVB Star Awards Malaysia	My Favourite TVB Actor	Ruco Chan	Won	Top 5
2016 TVB Star Awards Malaysia	My Favourite TVB Actor	Benjamin Yuen	Nominated	Top 5
2016 TVB Star Awards Malaysia	My Favourite TVB Actress	Nancy Wu	Won	Top 5
2016 TVB Star Awards Malaysia	My Favourite TVB Supporting Actor	Philip Ng	Nominated	Top 3
2016 TVB Star Awards Malaysia	My Favourite TVB Supporting Actor	Carlo Ng	Nominated	
2016 TVB Star Awards Malaysia	My Favourite TVB Supporting Actress	Grace Wong	Nominated	Top 3
2016 TVB Star Awards Malaysia	My Favourite TVB Supporting Actress	Moon Lau	Nominated	Top 3
2016 TVB Star Awards Malaysia	My Favourite TVB Most Improved Actor	Jonathan Cheung	Won	Top 3
2016 TVB Star Awards Malaysia	My Favourite TVB Most Improved Actress	Moon Lau	Won	Top 3
2016 TVB Star Awards Malaysia	My Favourite TVB On-Screen Couple	Ruco Chan and Nancy Wu	Won	Top 3
2016 TVB Star Awards Malaysia	My Favourite TVB Drama Characters	Ruco Chan as Chor Au-kuen	Won	
2016 TVB Star Awards Malaysia	My Favourite TVB Drama Characters	Nancy Wu as Tiu Lan	Won	
2016 TVB Star Awards Malaysia	My Favourite TVB Drama Characters	Benjamin Yuen as Duen Ying-fung	Won	
2016 TVB Star Awards Malaysia	My Favourite TVB Drama Characters	Grace Wong as Fa Man	Won	
2016 TVB Star Awards Malaysia	My Favourite TVB Drama Characters	Philip Ng as Lung Shing-fu	Won	
2016 TVB Star Awards Malaysia	My Favourite TVB Drama Theme Song	"Never Know You Are the Best"	Won	
2016 TVB Anniversary Awards	Best Drama	A Fist Within Four Walls	Won	
2016 TVB Anniversary Awards	Best Actor	Ruco Chan	Won	Top 5
2016 TVB Anniversary Awards	Best Actor	Benjamin Yuen	Nominated	Top 5
2016 TVB Anniversary Awards	Best Actress	Nancy Wu	Won	Top 5
2016 TVB Anniversary Awards	Most Popular Male Character	Ruco Chan as Chor Au-kuen	Nominated	Top 5
2016 TVB Anniversary Awards	Most Popular Male Character	Benjamin Yuen as Duen Ying-fung	Won	Top 5
2016 TVB Anniversary Awards	Most Popular Female Character	Nancy Wu as Tiu Lan	Nominated	Top 5
2016 TVB Anniversary Awards	Most Popular Female Character	Grace Wong as Fa Man	Won	Top 5
2016 TVB Anniversary Awards	Most Popular Female Character	Yuen Qiu as Yuk Bo-fung	Nominated	
2016 TVB Anniversary Awards	Best Supporting Actor	Philip Ng	Nominated	
2016 TVB Anniversary Awards	Best Supporting Actor	Carlo Ng	Nominated	
2016 TVB Anniversary Awards	Best Supporting Actor	Oscar Li	Nominated	
2016 TVB Anniversary Awards	Best Supporting Actor	Jimmy Au	Nominated	
2016 TVB Anniversary Awards	Best Supporting Actress	Grace Wong	Nominated	Top 3
2016 TVB Anniversary Awards	Most Improved Male Artiste	Jonathan Cheung	Won	
2016 TVB Anniversary Awards	Most Improved Female Artiste	Moon Lau	Nominated	
2016 TVB Anniversary Awards	Most Popular Drama Theme Song	"Siege"	Nominated	
2016 TVB Anniversary Awards	Most Popular Drama Theme Song	"Never Know You Are the Best"	Won	Top 3
2016 TVB Anniversary Awards	Most Popular On-Screen Partnership	Ruco Chan and Benjamin Yuen	Nominated	
2016 Yahoo! Asia Buzz Awards	Most Popular Television Drama	A Fist Within Four Walls	Won	
2016 Yahoo! Asia Buzz Awards	Most Popular Male TV Artiste	Ruco Chan	Won	
2016 Yahoo! Asia Buzz Awards	Most Popular Female TV Artiste	Nancy Wu	Won	
2016 Yahoo! Asia Buzz Awards	Rising Popularity	Benjamin Yuen	Won	
2016 Yahoo! Asia Buzz Awards	Most Popular On-Screen Couple	Philip Ng and Moon Lau	Won	
2016 Yahoo! Asia Buzz Awards	Most Popular Drama Duet	"Never Know You Are the Best"	Won	
