= The Unholy Alliance (TV series) =

Hong Kong action television series

- Official poster
- Also known as: The Alliance
- 同盟
- Genre: Crime; Action; Thriller; Martial arts
- Created by: Jazz Boon
- Written by: Ng Lap-kwong
- Starring: Nina Paw; Ruco Chan; Nancy Wu; Joel Chan; Elaine Yiu; Kwok Fung; Jimmy Au; KK Cheung; Elena Kong
- Opening theme: "一觸即發" (Lit By A Spark) by Ruco Chan
- Ending theme: "風的季節" (The Season Of The Wind) by Rosanne Lui
- Country of origin: Hong Kong
- Original languages: Cantonese, Mandarin
- No. of episodes: 28

Production
- Producer: Jazz Boon
- Production locations: China Hong Kong; China Taiwan
- Running time: 45 minutes
- Production company: TVB

Original release
- Network: TVB Jade
- Release: 7 August – 14 September 2017

Related
- Bet Hur; Line Walker: The Prelude

The Unholy Alliance
- Chinese: 同盟
- Cantonese Yale: Tùngmàng
- Literal meaning: "alliance"
Transcriptions
Standard Mandarin
- Hanyu Pinyin: Tóngméng
- Bopomofo: ㄊㄨㄥˊㄇㄥˊ
- IPA: [tʰʊ̌ŋ.mə̌ŋ]
Yue: Cantonese
- Yale Romanization: Tùngmàng
- Jyutping: Tung4mang4
- IPA: [tʰȍŋ.mɐ̏ŋ]

"The Unholy Alliance" (Chinese: 同盟; Cantonese Yale: Tùngmàng; literally "Alliance") is an action crime-thriller television drama created by Jazz Boon and TVB. Principal photography began in Hong Kong in September 2016, and continued in Taiwan in December 2016. It premiered on TVB Jade on 7 August 2017, and for MediaCorp's Channel U in July 2019, and ran for 28 episodes.

Boon has described The Unholy Alliance as a Mission: Impossible-style action thriller that features modern martial arts, including MMA, Brazilian jiu-jitsu, Krav Maga and gun fu. It stars Nina Paw, Ruco Chan, Nancy Wu, Joel Chan, Elaine Yiu, Kwok Fung, Jimmy Au, KK Cheung, and Elena Kong. The Unholy Alliance follows a modern Hong Kong crime family, led by the matriarch Ling Hung (Paw).

== Synopsis ==
Surfer Ko Tsz-kit, who runs a B&B in Taiwan, is ambushed by assassins. Though he is saved by the agile backpacker Yuen Ching-yan, his adoptive mother dies at the scene. To probe into the matter, Tsz-kit returns to Hong Kong alone. With his best friend Tai Wah-koon pulling a few strings for him, Tsz-kit uncovers that his adoptive mother’s death is connected to Ling Hung, an Iron Lady running multiple syndicates, who is so powerful that her decision will lead to a profound impact on the economy and livelihoods of the communities. Her adopted son Kent Ling and his girlfriend Kate Wei are her think-tanks; whereas Ching-yan is her bodyguard. However, Tsz-kit's appearance turns their relationship upside down. Meanwhile, Ling Hung's affiliates are waiting for an opportunity to wreak havoc, putting her life in imminent danger. Though Ching-yan and Tsz-kit join forces to strike back, they trigger a new wave of bloodshed that is about to engulf the whole society......

== Cast and characters ==
=== The Ling Family ===
- Nina Paw as Ling Hung (令熊), a powerful businesswoman who runs several international syndicates across the world. To protect her son from falling into the hands of her enemies, she sends him to Taiwan, where he is raised by a foster mother. Her role is likened to the Chinese female Wu Zetian and Vito Corleone from The Godfather.
- Ruco Chan as Ko Tsz-kit (高子杰), Ling Hung's biological son, who was raised in Taiwan. He goes on a search for his true parentage after surviving an assassination attempt. In a grand plan to fool Rainman and gain her trust, Kit takes over as temporary president of the Union while keeping a ruse that she has divided the family apart. To ultimately save his mother and Kent, he replaces Kam Tin as Rainman and spends the next two years taking down Hong Kong's corruption before returning home to his remaining loved ones.
- Nancy Wu as Naka Yuen Ching-yan (阮清欣), Tsz-kit's bodyguard, who poses as a backpacker when she first meets him. Yan is actually sent by Ling Hung to protect him. She was born in a village located in the northern part of Thailand. She was trained to be a killing machine at her childhood.
- Joel Chan as Kent Ling Tsin-yau (令千佑), Ling Hung's adopted son who was picked up on the day of Ling Hung's son Tsz-Kit's birthday. Despite knowing that Kit is his mother's illegitimate son, he does not hold any hard feelings and gets along with him well.
- Elaine Yiu as Kate Wei Yi-yau (韋以柔), Kent's girlfriend, and is in charge of public relations at Ling Hung's company. She is the youngest daughter of the Wei family, the enemy family of Ling Hung.
- Kwok Fung as Wei Lui (韋磊), Kate's father.
  Rival/Enemy of Ling Hung
  indirectly cause his two sons' death
  seeks redemption in near the finale by sacrificing himself to reveal the identity of Rainman
- Jimmy Au as Yik Fung (易風), Ling Hung's bodyguard and trustworthy friend.
  Died in the finale while protecting Ling Hung from Rainman's henchmen
- KK Cheung as Ling Lit (令烈), Ling Hung and Ling Hei's younger brother. Died in a car explosion cause by Rainman's henchmen.
- Mary Hon as Ling Hei (令熹), Ling Hung and Ling Lit's sister.
  Killed by Antony in the finale to get hold of Ling corporation.
- Pierre Ngo as Ricky Ling Chi-sin (令智煽), Ling Lit's younger son
  Shot to dead in self-defense by Ko Tsz-kit in Taiwan for plotting to kill Ling Hung with no remorse after his plotting with the Lui family was exposed.
- Lam Tsz-sin (Jazz Lam) as Anthony Ling Ka-ming (令家名), Ling Lit's older son
  Killed by poison gas set by Rainman for Ling Hung, which he became a scapegoat caused by Ko Tsz-kit in the finale.
- Roxanne Tong as Kelly Law Ho-man (羅皓雯), Ling Hei's older daughter.
- Bella Lam as Chloe Law Ho-yee (羅皓兒), Ling Hei's younger daughter.

=== Recurring cast ===
- Griselda Yeung as Tina, Ling Lit's wife
- Becky Lee as Hilda, Ling Ka-ming/Anthony's wife
  has an affair with Ling Chi-sin
- Carlo Ng as Sunny, Ling Hei's husband
- Oscar Leung as G-Force, Ko Tsz-Kit's best friend
- Man Yeung as Wei Lui's older son/Michael
  Died with his younger brother in Taiwan when trying to save his younger sister, Kate
- Mandy Lam as Wei Lui's older son's wife, Wei Lui's older daughter-in-law
- Stefan Wong as Wei Lui's younger son/George
  Die with his older brother in Taiwan when trying to save his younger sister, Kate
- Kimmy Kwan as Wei Lui's younger son's wife, Wei Lui's younger daughter-in-law
- Stephen Wong Hong Kong Police Inspector
- Lily Leung as Ling Hung's mother
- Elena Kong as Kam Tin also known as 'Rainman', Hong Kong's Chairman of the Criminal Justice Committee.
  Controls Hong Kong's corrupted police officers and blackmails high position officials supported by four corrupted greedy richest men in Hong Kong.
  Killed by her henchman on the order of her behind scene bosses after she is no longer useful to them since her identity was exposed to the public.
- Chloe Yuen (阮兒) in flashback, as Ling Hung's best friend and body double; introduced in Ep.6
- Candice Chiu in flashback, as young Ling Hung

== Production and casting ==
Producer Jazz Boon had always wanted to do a kung fu-themed production. After the commercial success of his 2014 television drama Line Walker, Boon was finally given the opportunity to conceive his own kung fu story with 2016's A Fist Within Four Walls. Boon had strong chemistry with the A Fist Within Four Walls cast. Halfway into filming the drama, he started working on The Unholy Alliance with his Four Walls cast in mind.

The Unholy Alliance was officially announced in mid-August 2016. The Hong Kong media regarded it as a "modern" version of Boon's A Fist Within Four Walls, which was set in the 1960s. Four Walls leads Ruco Chan and Nancy Wu were the first cast members to be announced for The Unholy Alliance in August 2016. Paw Hee-ching, who was in negotiations with TVB since March 2016, was announced next. The Unholy Alliance is Paw's first TVB production.

Lam Tsz-sin, Elaine Yiu, Joel Chan, Oscar Leung, and Bella Lam were confirmed to be part of the cast days later. Four Walls actors Grace Wong and Benjamin Yuen were invited to star, but declined the offer due to schedule clashes. The action choreographer for The Unholy Alliance was announced to be Philip Kwok, who also choreographed Four Walls.

On 24 July 2017, the opening theme video was released.
