= Outbound Love =

Hong Kong television series

- Official poster
- Also known as: Unrequited Love in Double Cities
- 單戀雙城
- Genre: Romantic Comedy
- Created by: Hong Kong Television Broadcasts Limited
- Written by: Kwan Chong Ling (關頌玲); Law Wan Fong (羅雲芳); Cheung Chung An (張仲恩); Chan Po Yan (陳寶燕); Siew Kwok Wah (蕭國華); Ng Wan Ying (伍婉瑩); Siew Kwok Fei (蕭國輝); Cheung Ki Wing (張啟榮); Yeung Suet Yi (楊雪兒)
- Directed by: Cheng Wing Kei (鄭永基); Lai Pak Kin (黎栢堅); Wong Ru Lok (黄汝樂); Cheung Wing Fei (張永輝); Fong Chun Chiu (方駿釗)
- Starring: Ruco Chan; Aimee Chan; Rosina Lam; Tony Hung; Matt Yeung; Samantha Ko; Vivien Yeo
- Theme music composer: Rannes Man
- Opening theme: I Really Want To Hate You (很想討厭你) by Lin Xiawei
- Country of origin: Hong Kong
- Original language: Cantonese
- No. of episodes: 22

Production
- Producer: Fong Chun Chiu (方駿釗)
- Production locations: Hong Kong, Malaysia Kuala Lumpur, Penang
- Editors: Chan Ching Yi (陳靜儀); Kwan Chong Ling (關頌玲)
- Camera setup: Multi camera
- Running time: 45 minutes
- Production company: TVB

Original release
- Network: Jade; HD Jade
- Release: 20 January – 14 February 2014

Related
- Return of the Silver Tongue; Storm in a Cocoon

Outbound Love
- Traditional Chinese: 單戀雙城
- Simplified Chinese: 单恋双城
- Literal meaning: "Unrequited Love in Double Cities"
Transcriptions
Standard Mandarin
- Hanyu Pinyin: dan lian shuang cheng
Yue: Cantonese
- Yale Romanization: daan1 lyun2 soeng1 seng4
- Jyutping: daan1 lyun2 soeng1 seng4

Outbound Love (Chinese: 單戀雙城; literally "Unrequited Love in Double Cities"), is a Hong Kong romantic comedy serial produced by TVB and Astro. Filming for this series took place in Hong Kong and Malaysia, with Ruco Chan, Aimee Chan, Rosina Lam and Tony Hung as the main cast.

== Synopsis ==
Travel agency employee, Law Sik Sik (Aimee Chan) travels to Malaysia alone for work but all her plans were disrupted by a "playful" tour guide there named Luk Kung Tsz (Ruco Chan). Both of them held grudges against each other because of this incident. Meanwhile, Sik Sik's boyfriend Ching Zin Bok (Matt Yeung) proposes to her and they held their engagement ceremony back in Hong Kong. When Sik Sik thinks she's the world's most blissful bride, a clip of her boyfriend cheating on her was played during the engagement ceremony. With a broken heart, Sik Sik goes to Malaysia where she meets Kung Zi again at her workplace. From then, both of them developed good feelings for each other. Zin Bok's sister Ching Zin Zan (Lin Xiawei) supports her best friend decision to break up with her brother instead of forgiving him. Under Sik Sik's introduction, Zin Zan gets to know chef Cin Jun (Tony Hung) and starts learning cooking from him. After getting along with Cin Jun for some time, Zin Zan falls for him however Cin Jun only likes Sik Sik. When Cin Jun prepares to profess his love for Sik Sik, Zin Bok comes back to seek Sik Sik's forgiveness with the help of Kung Tsz...

== Main cast ==
- Ruco Chan as Luk Kung Tsz (陸恭梓)
- Aimee Chan as Law Sik Sik (羅式適)
- Rosina Lam as Ching Chin Chan (程展禛)
- Tony Hung as Chin Chun (錢進)

== Recurring cast ==
- Mat Yeung as Nic, Ching Chin Bok (程展博)
- Samantha Ko as Wong Kei Ying (黃淇英)
- Vivien Yeo as Yvonne, Lau Yam (劉音)
- Benz Hui as Tse Wan Fung (謝雲鋒)
- Amy Fan as Law Shu Shu (羅書舒)
- Willie Wai as Shun Wing (專榮)
- Elliot Ngok as Law Wai (羅威)
- Elaine Yiu as Hong Yi Kiu (康以蕎)
- Law Lok Lam as Sky, Mak Kwai Tin (麥貫天)
- Mary Hon as To Wai Sum (杜惠心)
- Helen Ma as Lei Lai Sze (李麗詩)
- Rachel Kan as Siu Mei Ling (邵美玲)

== Viewership ratings ==
Week	Episodes	Date	Average Points	Peaking Points
1	01－05	January 20–24, 2014	26	27
2	06－09	January 27–30, 2014	24	27
3	10－14	February 4–7, 2014	25	27
4	15－19	February 10–14, 2014	28	31
4	20	February 15, 2014	24	
4	21-22	February 16, 2014	32	35
