= Vivien Yeo =

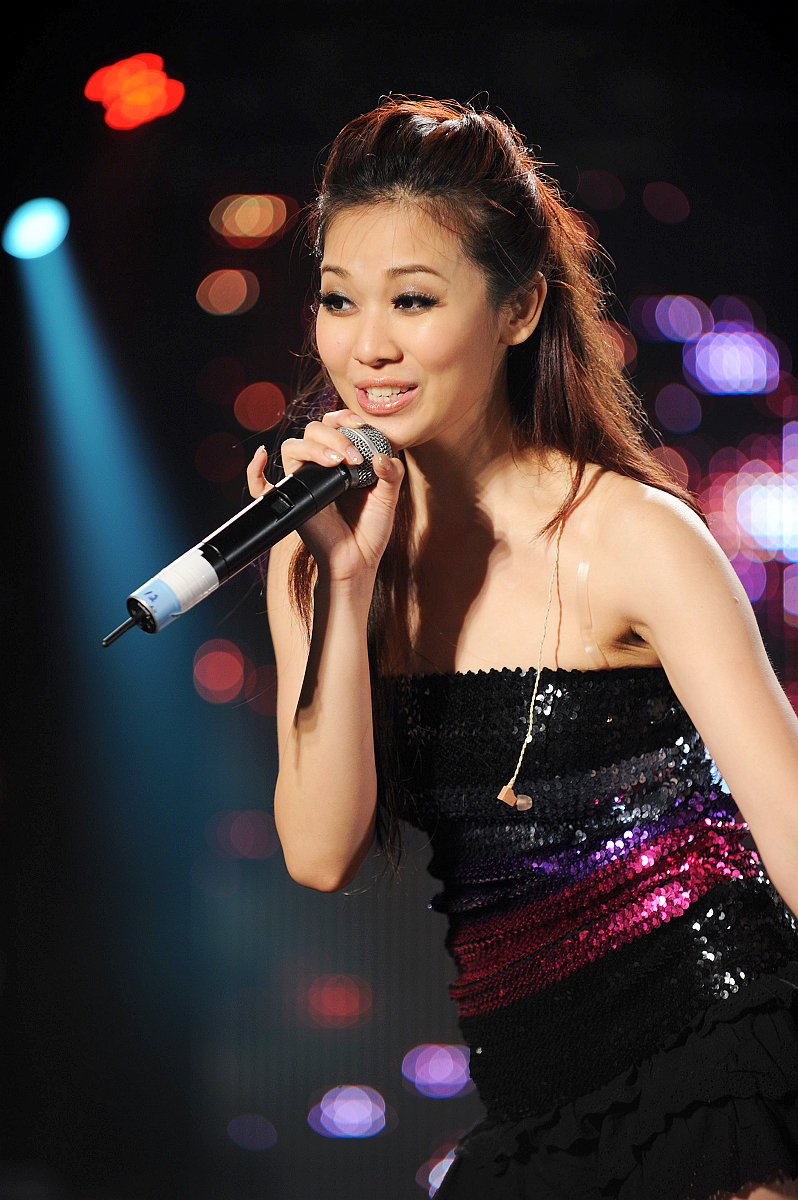
- Yeo in 2010
- Born: Yeo Siew Hui 楊㛢僡 (Iûⁿ Siù-hūi); 20 July 1984 (age 42); Johor Bahru, Malaysia
- Citizenship: Malaysia
- Occupations: Actress; model; entrepreneur
- Years active: 2004–present
- Spouse: Yip Sai Yeung (m. 2019)
- Children: 2

Chinese name
- Traditional Chinese: 楊秀惠
- Simplified Chinese: 杨秀惠
Transcriptions
Standard Mandarin
- Hanyu Pinyin: Yáng Xìuhùi
Yue: Cantonese
- Jyutping: Joeng4 Sau3 Wai6
- Musical career
- Instrument: Piano

Vivien Yeo Siew Hui (Chinese: 楊秀惠; Pe̍h-ōe-jī: Iûⁿ Siù-hūi; born 20 July 1984) is a Malaysian Chinese actress and businesswoman. She represented Malaysia at the 2004 Miss Chinese International Pageant and made her acting debut in the 2004 youth drama series Sunshine Heartbeat. She is best known for her roles in Ghost of Relativity (2015) and The Learning Curve of a Warlord (2018).

Yeo is the founder of Vivien Yeo's Beauty Store, a cosmetics store with locations in Malaysia, Singapore, and Hong Kong.

== Personal life ==
Yeo married in 2019 and gave birth to two daughters, in 2020 and 2022.

== Filmography ==
=== Television ===
Year	Title	Role	Notes
2004	Sunshine Heartbeat	Yip Ching/Mia	
2005	Revolving Doors of Vengeance	model	
2005	Into Thin Air	Lam Yan-yan	
2006	Under the Canopy of Love	Lee Choi Yan (Bibi)	
2006	Forensic Heroes	Ling Sum-yi (Josie)	
2006	The Price of Greed	Suen Wu Sang	warehoused and broadcast in 2008
2007	The Drive of Life	Carman	
2007	Colours of Love	Ah Ching	
2007	The Ultimate Crime Fighter	Mui Mui	
2007	Men Don't Cry	Ling Yuk-bik	
2008	War of In-Laws II	Sung Tsz-kiu (Athena)	
2008	Forensic Heroes II	Ling Sum-yi (Josie)	
2008	Pages of Treasures	Tsui Hei-man (Hillary)	
2009	ICAC Investigators 2009	Ho Lai-man	ep. 1
2010	The Season of Fate	Wong Kam-fung	
2010	Growing Through Life	Fong Lai-ha	
2010	Every Move You Make	Fan Xiao-li	
2011	A Great Way to Care	Suen Ka-pik	2009 Warehoused drama Nominated — TVB Anniversary Award for Best Supporting Actress (Top 15)
2011	Only You	Vivian	
2011	Curse of the Royal Harem	Consort Yun	
2012	Daddy Good Deeds	Kong Cui-Sze	
2012	King Maker	Consort Tak	
2013	The Day of Days	Tai Ying	
2013	Beauty at War	Cheung Ying-kam	
2013	Triumph in the Skies II	Vivian	guest star ep. 21
2013	Always and Ever	Consort Suk	
2014	Outbound Love	Lau Yam	
2014	Ruse of Engagement	Yeung Lok-man	
2014	Black Heart White Soul	Yeung Man-bing	
2015	Eye in the Sky	Hon San	
2015	Ghost of Relativity	Lolita Law Lai-fa	
2016	Fashion War	Ada Tsui Yi-sam	
2016	Inspector Gourmet	Lee Nga-Choi	
2016	My Lover from the Planet Meow	Natasha Lam Tai-sa	
2017	My Dearly Sinful Mind	Yeung Hau-man	
2018	The Learning Curve of a Warlord	Ai Ngau	
2020	Brutally Young	Tse Ka-sin	

=== Film ===
Year	Title	Role	Notes
2005	Moments of Love	Ah V	
2008	Forgive and Forget	Maggie	
2011	I Love Hong Kong		
2013	Laughing Every Day		
2016	Buddy Cops		

== Awards ==
- (2003) Miss Astro Chinese International winner (Miss Photogenic, Miss Elegance, Miss Fresh Look, Best Figure Award)
- (2004) Top five finalist in Miss Chinese International 2004 pageants

Preceded by Rachel Tan 陳泳錦	Miss Astro Chinese International; 2003	Succeeded by Jolene Chin 陈影雯
