= Black Heart White Soul =

2014 Hong Kong modern thriller TVB serial

- Official poster
- 忠奸人
- Genre: Modern; Thriller
- Created by: Hong Kong Television Broadcasts Limited
- Written by: Lui Sau Lin (雷秀蓮); Poon Hoi An (潘凱恩); Lui Zheng Ching (呂正清); Hui Ka Yu (許嘉瑜); Wong Chi Yan (黃智欣); Calif Chong (莊藝文); Chan Chee Keung (陳志強); Au Ka Wai (區嘉慧)
- Directed by: Wong Wai Yan (王偉仁); Lui Sui Lin (雷瑞麟); Wong Ru Lok (黄汝樂); Chan Siu Ling (陳筱玲)
- Starring: Roger Kwok; Kristal Tin; Ron Ng; Kiki Sheung; Louis Cheung; Waise Lee
- Opening theme: Black Heart White Soul (灰色命運) by Ronald Law & Hoffman Cheng
- Ending theme: Ever (如初) by Louis Cheung "Kingdom of Ashes" by Ryan Amon (Episode 30)
- Country of origin: Hong Kong
- Original language: Cantonese
- No. of episodes: 30

Production
- Producer: Amy Wong
- Production location: Hong Kong
- Editor: Lau Chi Wah (劉枝華)
- Camera setup: Multi camera
- Running time: 45 minutes
- Production company: TVB

Original release
- Network: Jade; HD Jade
- Release: 14 July – 22 August 2014

Black Heart White Soul
- Traditional Chinese: 忠奸人
- Simplified Chinese: 忠奸人
- Literal meaning: Semi Evil Man
Transcriptions
Standard Mandarin
- Hanyu Pinyin: zhōng jiān rén
Yue: Cantonese
- Jyutping: zung1 gaan1 jan4

Black Heart White Soul (Chinese: 忠奸人) is a Hong Kong modern thriller serial produced by TVB. This series was featured in the TVB's 2014 Sales Presentation.

== Synopsis ==
May Tam (Kristal Tin) who has low moral consciousness takes the rap for her boyfriend who has committed a crime. After serving her sentence, Matthew Ko (Roger Kwok), a lawyer helps her start afresh by giving her a job at his law firm. Ko initially had a bright future but was crushed when rookie police officer Cheung Lap Fan (Ron Ng) accidentally injures him while on a mission, causing Ko to need to use a wheelchair for the rest of his life. At the same time, this creates an opportunity for the two to break the law. As Ko's hidden conspiracies are exposed, Cheung harbors him out of guilt. Eventually, will Tam be able to make the right choice between love and morality?

== Cast ==
=== Main cast ===
- Roger Kwok as Matt Ko Chit Hang (高哲行)
- Kristal Tin as May Tam Mei Ching (譚美貞)
- Ron Ng as Funny Cheung Lap Fan (張立勳)
- Kiki Sheung as Sin Wai Ying (冼慧英)
- Louis Cheung as Marco Ma Kai Yuen (馬啟源)
- Waise Lee as Henry To Yi Hang (杜以鏗)
- Jason Chan Chi-san as Alvis Yung Chi Chung (翁子聰)
- Mat Yeung as Lau Yim (劉焱)
- Becky Lee as Denise Chiu Man Fai (趙敏暉)
- Leanne Li as Scarlet Sze Ka Lei (施嘉莉)
- Vivien Yeo as Icy Yeung Man Bing (楊漫冰)

=== Other cast ===
- Lisa Lau as Gillian To Cheuk Chi (杜綽姿)
- May Chan as Lau Miu (劉淼)
- Claire Yiu as Yip Ying Sum (葉應心)
- Parkman Wong as Siu Wing Kwong (蕭永光)
- Derek Wong as Benjamin Ko Chit Ming (高哲明)
- Jennifer Shum as Ada
- Koo Koon Chung as Kwong King Cheung (鄺景昌)
- Joe Tay as Leung Ching Wah (梁正華)
- Lau Kong as Ko Lam (高霖)
- Gregory Lee as Choi Chi Gung (蔡子峰)
- Momo Wu as Lung (綸)
- Man Yeung Ching Wah
- Burmie Wong

== Viewership Ratings ==
Week	Episodes	Date	Average Points	Peaking Points
1	01－05	July 14–18, 2014	25	28
2	06－10	July 21–25, 2014	25	26
3	11－15	July 28-Aug 1, 2014	25	27
4	16－20	Aug 4–8, 2014	25	27
5	21－25	Aug 11–15, 2014	27	31
6	26－30	Aug 18–22, 2014	29	31

== Others ==
Before the show started filming, TVB received complaints from fans over Ron Ng not being the lead and being given repetitive roles.
