= Ruse of Engagement =

Hong Kong television series

- Official poster
- Also known as: ATF反恐; ATF: Anti-Terrorist Force
- 叛逃
- Genre: Crime drama Action; Thriller
- Created by: Hong Kong Television Broadcasts Limited
- Written by: Ka Wai-nam
- Starring: Louise Lee; Ruco Chan; Ron Ng; Aimee Chan; Yoyo Mung; Eddie Kwan; Kenny Wong; Lai Lok-yi
- Theme music composer: Yip Siu-chung
- Opening theme: "Nick of Time" (千鈞一髮) by Ron Ng & Ruco Chan
- Country of origin: Hong Kong
- Original language: Cantonese
- No. of episodes: 25

Production
- Executive producer: Catherine Tsang
- Producer: Amy Wong
- Production location: Hong Kong
- Camera setup: Multi camera
- Production company: TVB

Original release
- Network: TVB Jade, HD Jade
- Release: 17 March – 18 April 2014

Ruse of Engagement
- Chinese: 叛逃
- Literal meaning: "traitor escapes"
Transcriptions
Standard Mandarin
- Hanyu Pinyin: pàntáo
Yue: Cantonese
- Jyutping: bun6 tou4

Ruse of Engagement (Chinese: 叛逃; Jyutping: Bun6 Tou4; 'The Traitor Escapes') is a Hong Kong action crime television drama produced by TVB. Created by Amy Wong, the drama follows two brothers who work as paramilitary officers in the Anti-Terrorist Force (ATF), a fictional intelligence agency inspired by the Counter Terrorism Response Unit of the Hong Kong police force. Ruse of Engagement aired on 17 March to 18 April 2014 on TVB Jade with 25 episodes.

== Synopsis ==
A bright environment does not mean that darkness does not exist, a peaceful society does not mean that danger does not exist. This era needs a vigilant society to be prepared for emergencies and unexpected events. Although natural disasters and violent acts cause people to panic, the scariest is actually people's mind. As such, decisive action must be taken to stop these terrorists from creating trouble in society, including Hong Kong itself.

After an encounter with some terrorists and barely making out of the scene alive, Carson and Alfred, two brothers raised by their widowed mother Tong Shuk-fun, join the ATF together, an agency under the Security Bureau (Hong Kong). Each specialising in a different talent, Carson succeeds in the force's intelligence unit while Alfred joins ATF's operations unit. With both brothers earning the respect and trust of their superior, ACP Steve Shum, Shuk-fun thought that it was finally time for her to retire in peace.

However, after receiving a piece of intelligence, the two brothers suddenly change sides and become enemies. Carson discovers reliable information about a secret organization through journalist Yip Ting, and he almost loses his life investigating it. Yip Ting saves Carson but Carson is exposed of his lies as he attempts to protect Yip Ting. Carson attempts to seek revenge as the ATF members believe he has strayed to their enemy's side. Unable to reinstate himself back in the team, he convinces his girlfriend Jessica, an intelligence analyst for ATF, to secretly obtain information from the force's database to help with his investigation. Carson later bombs the ATF headquarters but find out afterwards he had been seeking help from someone who he thought was a friend of his.

With details of the case leaking to the opposing organization, Alfred believes that his brother is the mole. Meanwhile, Carson focuses his efforts on luring the real mole, abandoning all ethics in the process. The situation worsens as it is believed that the secret organisation in Hong Kong plans to spread a virus and earn money from it. Would the ATF be able to stop them before they infect the entire world?

== Main cast ==
- Louise Lee as Tong Shuk-fun
- Ruco Chan as Carson Chong Yau-ching
- Ron Ng as Alfred Chong Yau-kit
- Aimee Chan as Jessica Chung Yat-ka
- Yoyo Mung as Yip Ting

== Recurring cast ==
- Eddie Kwan as Steven Shum Chi-ngo
- Lai Lok-yi as "Negative" Fu Wang-leung
- Kenny Wong as Ko Wai
- Law Lok-lam as Kiu Kim-hang
- Joseph Lee as Chung Lai-him
- Vivien Yeo as Yeung Lok-man
- Leanne Li as Betty "Beauty" Yeung Yan-mei
- Pancy Chan as Bonnie (Security)
- Andy Lau as Alan
- Alan Luk as Don Chan Ho-pong
- Fred Cheng as Eric Lee Kam
- Wu Kei-fung as Ben
- Fok Kin-bong as Cheung Yiu
- Jacky Lei as Lawrence
- Hà Vĩnh Phát as Võ Đình
- Vin Choi as Chung Ching-nam
- Li Shing-cheong as Wong Kwok-wing
- Kim Li
- Dickson Lee as Paul Sir
- Calvin Chan
- Joey Law
- Otto Chan
- Bond Chan
- Gill Mohindepaul Singh
- Steven Ho

== Development ==
Ruse of Engagement was a drama that was warehoused for three years by TVB. First introduced to audiences at the 2010 TVB Sales Presentation, then known as the working title "ATF". Production began in May 2011 with Ka Wai Nam (賈偉南) helming the screenplay. Production for the anticipated drama was completed in early September 2011, and post-production work, including the soundtrack additions were completed by late 2012, but for unknown reasons, the broadcast date was pushed back several times by TVB . In May 2013, TVB promoted Ruse of Engagement as one of its top 17 productions to look forward to at the 17th HK FILMART. In early January 2014, TVB finally confirmed that Ruse of Engagement will premiere in March of this year.

== Viewership ratings ==
Week	Episodes	Date	Average Points	Peaking Points
1	01－05	March 17–21, 2014	27	31
2	06－10	March 24–28, 2014	26	28
3	11－15	March 31-April 4, 2014	25	28
4	16－20	April 7–11, 2014	25	30
5	21－25	April 14–18, 2014	27	29

== International broadcast ==
- Malaysia - NTV7
- Singapore - Channel U (10pm)
