= Elaine Yiu =

Hong Kong actress (born 1980)

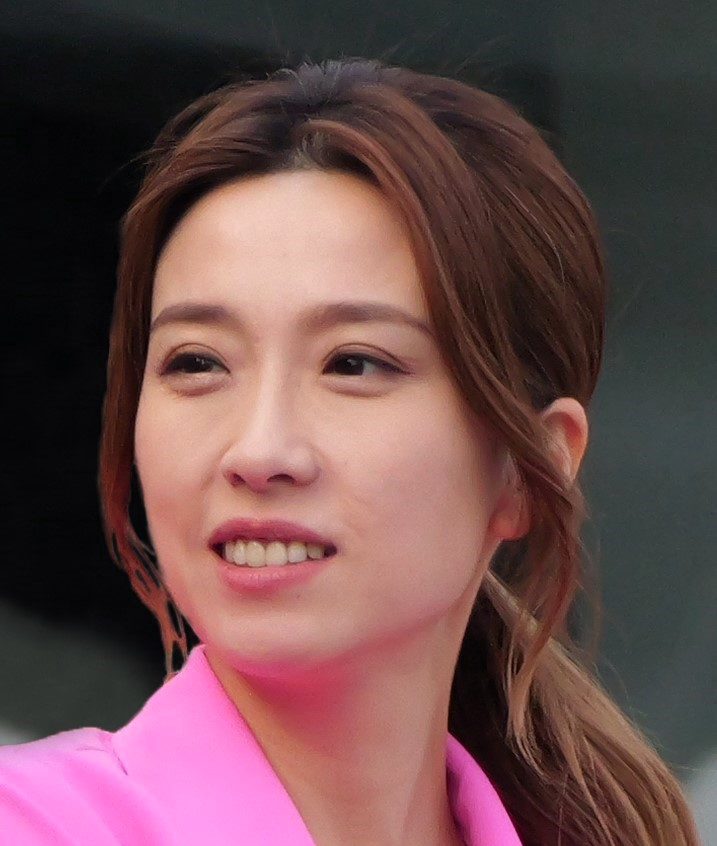
- Yiu in 2024
- Born: Yiu Wai Ling; 21 November 1980 (age 45); British Hong Kong
- Education: RMIT University
- Occupations: Actress, television host
- Years active: 2002 – present
- Notable work: Raising the Bar; Captain of Destiny; The Unholy Alliance
- Partner: Cheng Tsz Bon (2015–2018)
- Awards: TVB Anniversary Awards – Best Supporting Actress; 2015 Captain of Destiny TVB Star Awards Malaysia – Favourite Supporting Actress; 2015 Raising the Bar; 2017 The Unholy Alliance

Chinese name
- Traditional Chinese: 姚子羚
- Simplified Chinese: 姚子羚
Transcriptions
Standard Mandarin
- Hanyu Pinyin: Yáo Zǐlíng
Yue: Cantonese
- Jyutping: yiu3 Zi2 Ling4

Elaine Yiu (born 21 November 1980 in British Hong Kong) is a Hong Kong actress and television host contracted to TVB.

== Career ==
Yiu entered the entertainment industry after winning the TVB8 Presentator Contest in 2002, subsequently signing a management and filming contract with TVB. From 2002 to 2004, Yiu hosted Mandarin-language television programmes for TVB8. Yiu's acting debut was in the 2003 teen drama Hearts of Fencing, portraying the nerdy girl Man Man.

At the 2015 TVB Star Awards Malaysia, Yiu earned the Favourite TVB Supporting Actress and Favourite TVB Drama Character awards with her role as Vivian Cheung Wai-man (張慧芸) in the legal drama Raising the Bar (四個女仔三個BAR). Yiu's red-hot winning streak continued two weeks later in Hong Kong when she won the "Best Supporting Actress" award at the 2015 TVB Anniversary Awards with her role as Imperial Consort Yim (炎貴妃) in the ancient drama Captain of Destiny (張保仔).

In 2017, Yiu won the TVB Star Awards Malaysia for Favourite TVB Supporting Actress award again with her role in the 2017 action drama The Unholy Alliance (同盟) as Kate Wai Yee-yiu (韋以柔), which was her second win in the category.

In 2021, with her role as Anson Lui Kin (雷堅) in the drama The Ringmaster (拳王), Yiu was placed among the top 5 nominees for the Best Actress at the 2021 TVB Anniversary Awards.

== Personal life ==
Elaine Yiu attended RMIT University and majored in computer science.

She has a sister, Sandy Yiu, who works in Now TV (Hong Kong) as a news presenter.

Yiu is best friends with Myolie Wu, Nancy Wu, Paisley Wu, Mandy Wong and Selena Lee. They had formed the friendship group “胡說八道會” and had filmed a travel show together.

Due to their common interest in long-distance running, Yiu along with Benjamin Yuen, Joel Chan, Brian Tse, Jack Wu, Nancy Wu, Paisley Wu, Selena Lee and Mandy Wong formed the group “Crazy Runner”.

== Filmography ==
Television dramas
Year	Title	Role	Notes
2003	Hearts of Fencing	"Man Man" Lam Suet-man	Major Supporting Role
2004	Sunshine Heartbeat	"Man Man" Lam Suet-man	Guest Appearance
2004	To Catch the Uncatchable	Bebe Lai Siu-man	Ep. 3-6
2005	Revolving Doors of Vengeance	Chloe Cheng Ho-yi	Major Supporting Role
2006	Always Ready	Cally Ko Ho-oi	Major Supporting Role
2006	Safe Guards	Lee Cheung-fung	1st Female Lead
2006	Maidens' Vow	Lily Cheung Lei	Supporting Role
2007	The Ultimate Crime Fighter	Maria Keung Nga-chui	Supporting Role
2008	The Gentle Crackdown II	Tong Shui	Supporting Role
2008	The Seventh Day	Jade Yeung Hau-yi	Major Supporting Role
2008	A Journey Called Life	Hana Cheung Hoi-na	Supporting Role
2008	Speech of Silence	Kary Chai Ka-yi	Major Supporting Role
2008	Last One Standing	Mandy Tong Hoi-man	Major Supporting Role
2009	Burning Flame III	Minnie Cheuk Man	Major Supporting Role
2010	In the Eye of the Beholder	Shek Lau	Major Supporting Role
2010	Ghost Writer	Lau Sum-yin	Supporting Role
2010	When Lanes Merge	Vivian Cho Mei-wai	Major Supporting Role
2010	Beauty Knows No Pain	Pinky Wong	Guest Appearance (Ep. 20)
2010	Can't Buy Me Love	Chor Kiu	Cameo (Ep. 15)
2010	Some Day	Ivy Leng Mei-sze	Cameo
2011	Only You	"KaKa" Erica	Ep. 27–30
2011	Face To Fate	Ng Mao-dan	Supporting Role
2011	The Life and Times of a Sentinel	Man Kwan (Imperial Noble Consort)	Major Supporting Role
2011–12	Bottled Passion	Ko Yee-kiu	Major Supporting Role
2012	King Maker	Tung Yuk-kiu	Major Supporting Role
2012–13	Missing You	young Hui Yuk-mui	Guest Appearance
2013	Sergeant Tabloid	So Sing-pui	Ep. 19–21; Warehoused; released overseas April 2012
2013	Slow Boat Home	So Fung-nei / To Fung-nei	Supporting Role
2013	A Change of Heart	Yip Wing Yan	Supporting Role
2014	Outbound Love	Hong Yi-kiu	Major Supporting Role
2014	Swipe Tap Love	Emma Choi Yin	Major Supporting Role
2014	Shades of Life	Tung Oi-tung	1st Female Lead
2014	Rear Mirror	Mui Man-yi	Supporting Role
2015	Raising the Bar	Vivian Cheung	Major Supporting Role
2015	Come Home Love	Hoi Ning	Guest Appearance
2015	Every Step You Take	Yuen Yuen	Major Supporting Role
2015	Captain of Destiny	Imperial Consort Yim / So Fung-nei	Major Supporting Role
2015	Angel In-the-Making	Sylvia To Sin-fa	Major Supporting Role
2015–16	The Executioner	Yuen So-sam	Major Supporting Role
2016	ICAC Investigators 2016	Wendy Li	Supporting Role
2017	The Unholy Alliance	Kate Wai Yi-yau	Major Supporting Role
2017	The Tofu War	Celine Kei Hiu-ying	Major Supporting Role
2018	Succession War	Chang Mei	Major Supporting Role
2019	Justice Bao: The First Year	Kei Lim-lim	2nd Female Lead
2020	Of Greed and Ants	Shui Man-ching	1st Female Lead
2021	The Runner	Carrie Ho Ka-yan	1st Female Lead
2021	The Ringmaster	Anson Lui Kin	1st Female Lead
2021	Flying Tiger 3	Tao Yi-ying	Major Supporting Role
2022	The Righteous Fists	Kam Fuk-mui	Major Supporting Role
2023	Night Beauties	Michelle Shek Wai-king	2nd Female Lead
2024	Justice Sung Begins	Bak Ling-lung	1st Female Lead
2024	No Room For Crime	Lam Suet-Yee	Major Supporting Role

=== Films ===
- I Love Hong Kong (2011)

== Awards ==
Year	Award Ceremony	Category	Drama / Role	Results
2015	TVB Star Awards Malaysia	Favourite TVB Supporting Actress	Raising the Bar as Vivian Cheung Wai-wan	Won
2015	TVB Star Awards Malaysia	Top 16 Favourite TVB Drama Characters	Raising the Bar as Vivian Cheung Wai-wan	Won
2015	TVB Anniversary Awards	Best Supporting Actress	Captain of Destiny as Imperial Consort Yim	Won
2017	StarHub TVB Awards	My Favourite TVB Female TV Character	The Unholy Alliance as Kate Wai Yee-yau	Won
2017	TVB Star Awards Malaysia	Favourite TVB Supporting Actress	The Unholy Alliance as Kate Wai Yee-yau	Won
