= Lam Tsz-sin =

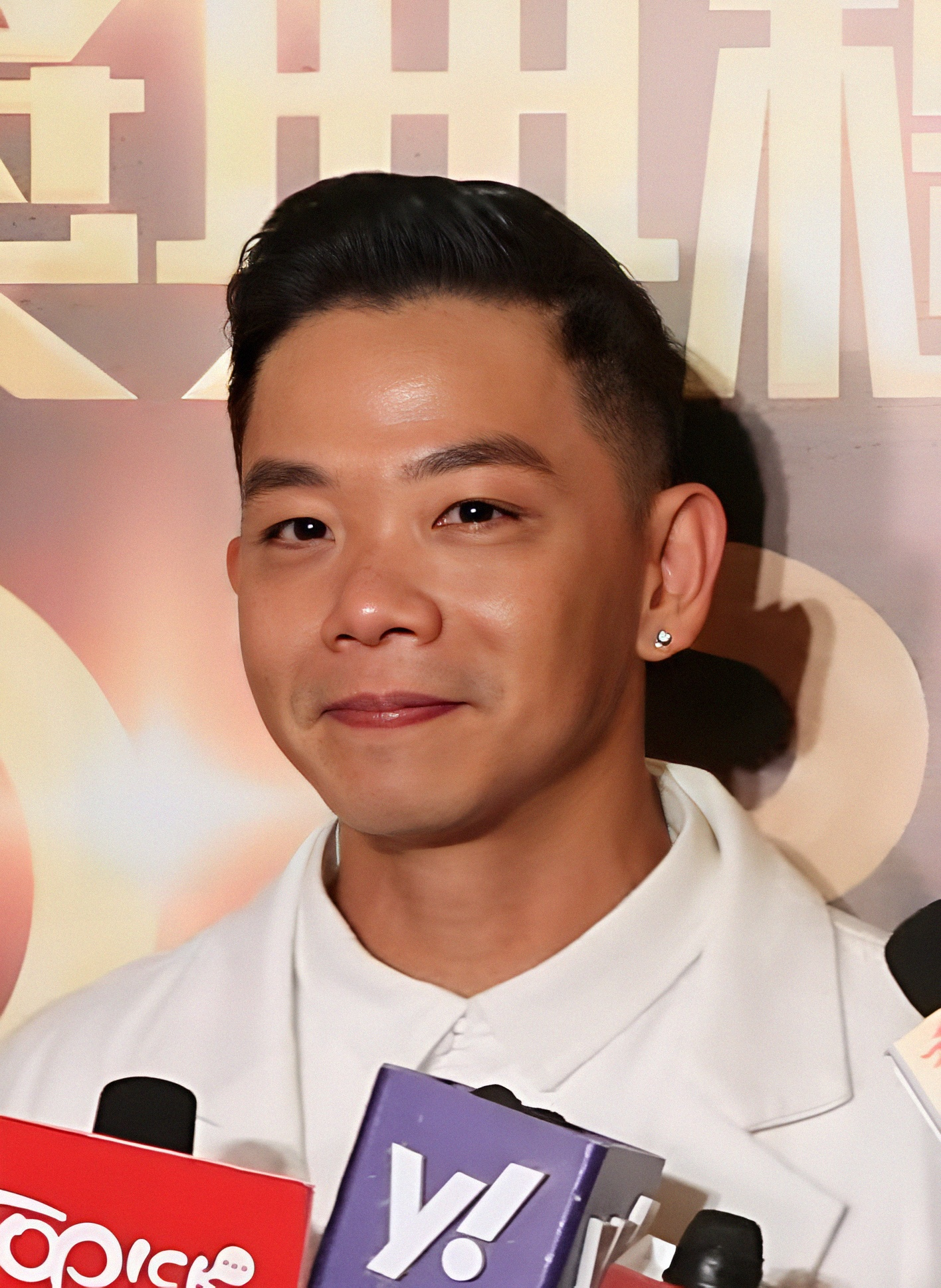
- Lam winning the Best Supporting Actor in TVB Awards Presentation 2023
- Born: 13 April 1982 (age 44); British Hong Kong
- Other name: Jazz Lam
- Occupation: Actor
- Years active: 1998–present
- Spouse: Kary Dong (m. 2017)
- Children: 1
- Awards: TVB Anniversary Awards – Best Supporting Actor; 2023 The Invisibles

Chinese name
Transcriptions
Standard Mandarin
- Hanyu Pinyin: Lín Zǐ Shàn
Yue: Cantonese
- Jyutping: lam4 zi2 sin6
- Musical career
- Origin: Hong Kong
- Label: TVB

Lam Tsz-sin (Chinese: 林子善; born 1982) is a Hong Kong actor.

== Career ==
In 2005, Lam began his acting career. Lam has made appearances in one of Stephen Chow's movies. He is best known for playing unconventional characters and comedic characters. Examples of such characters are in Ghetto Justice as a serious lawyer, who is humorous to the audience and in The Mysteries of Love as an annoying, but comedic older brother.

== Personal life ==
Jazz Lam started dating with his girlfriend Kary on May 20, 2011, registered for marriage on October 16, 2017, and hosted a supplementary wedding banquet at Crowne Plaza Tseung Kwan O on April 3, 2018. In the early morning of December 29, 2019, his wife gave birth to a daughter named Xiao Guaiguai.

== Filmography ==
=== Television dramas ===
Year	Title	Role	Notes
2005	The Gentle Crackdown		
2007	Men Don't Cry	Kam Chin-Pao	
2007	Marriage of Inconvenience		
2008	Love Exchange	Ling Ho-kei	
2009	E.U.	Lau Kwok-keung (La Ba)	
2009	The Winter Melon Tale	To Kwan	
2010	Don Juan DeMercado		
2010	My Better Half	Choi Cheuk-yim	
2010	A Fistful of Stances	Koo Yu-leung	
2010	The Mysteries of Love	Tsui Kwok-leung	
2010	A Pillow Case of Mystery II	Chukot Leung	
2011	My Sister of Eternal Flower	Danny Fa Wai-chung	
2011	Ghetto Justice	George Mike Jr.	
2011	River of Wine	Chu Ah-ngau	
2012	Tiger Cubs	Tang Fuk-chai	Guest star (Ep. 11)
2012	Ghetto Justice II	George Mike Jr.	
2012	Highs and Lows	Nin Yau-foo	
2013	Bounty Lady	But Fan-keung	
2014	The Ultimate Addiction	Wong Ying-biu (Tiger)	
2014	All That Is Bitter Is Sweet	Hung Bing	
2014	Come On, Cousin	Bao Jun	
2016	The Last Healer In Forbidden City	Kot Gan	
2016	Blue Veins	young Kam Kin	
2016	A Fist Within Four Walls	But Tak-liu	
2017	The Unholy Alliance	Anthony Ling Ka Ming	
2018	Apple-colada	Fung Kwong-fai	
2018	Stealing Seconds	Tsui Fei-ngai	
2019	Our Unwinding Ethos	Dali Poon Tak-li	
2019	Barrack O'Karma	Yuen Ka-koon	
2020	Line Walker: Bull Fight		
2021	The Runner	Silver Chin Wai	
2022	Barrack O’Karma 1968	But Tak-liu	
2022	I’ve Got The Power	Ko Sau	
2023	The Invisibles	Kiu Tai-nui	TVB Anniversary Award for Best Supporting Actor
2025	Anonymous Signal		

=== Film ===
Year	Title	Role	Notes
1999	King of Comedy	Hung	
1999	Metade Fumaca		
1999	The Legendary 'Tai Fei'		
2000	Jiang hu: The Triad Zone	Jo Jo's Brother	
2001	Shaolin Soccer		
2011	Men Suddenly in Love		
2013	Young and Dangerous: Reloaded		
2014	Fight for Glory		
2014	Unbeatable Youth		
2015	Wild City	Gei	
2016	The Gigolo 2	Dick	
2016	Nowhere to Hide!		
2018	Agent Mr Chan		
2019	Flirting Scholar from the Future		
