= Kristal Tin =

Hong Kong actress (born 1977)

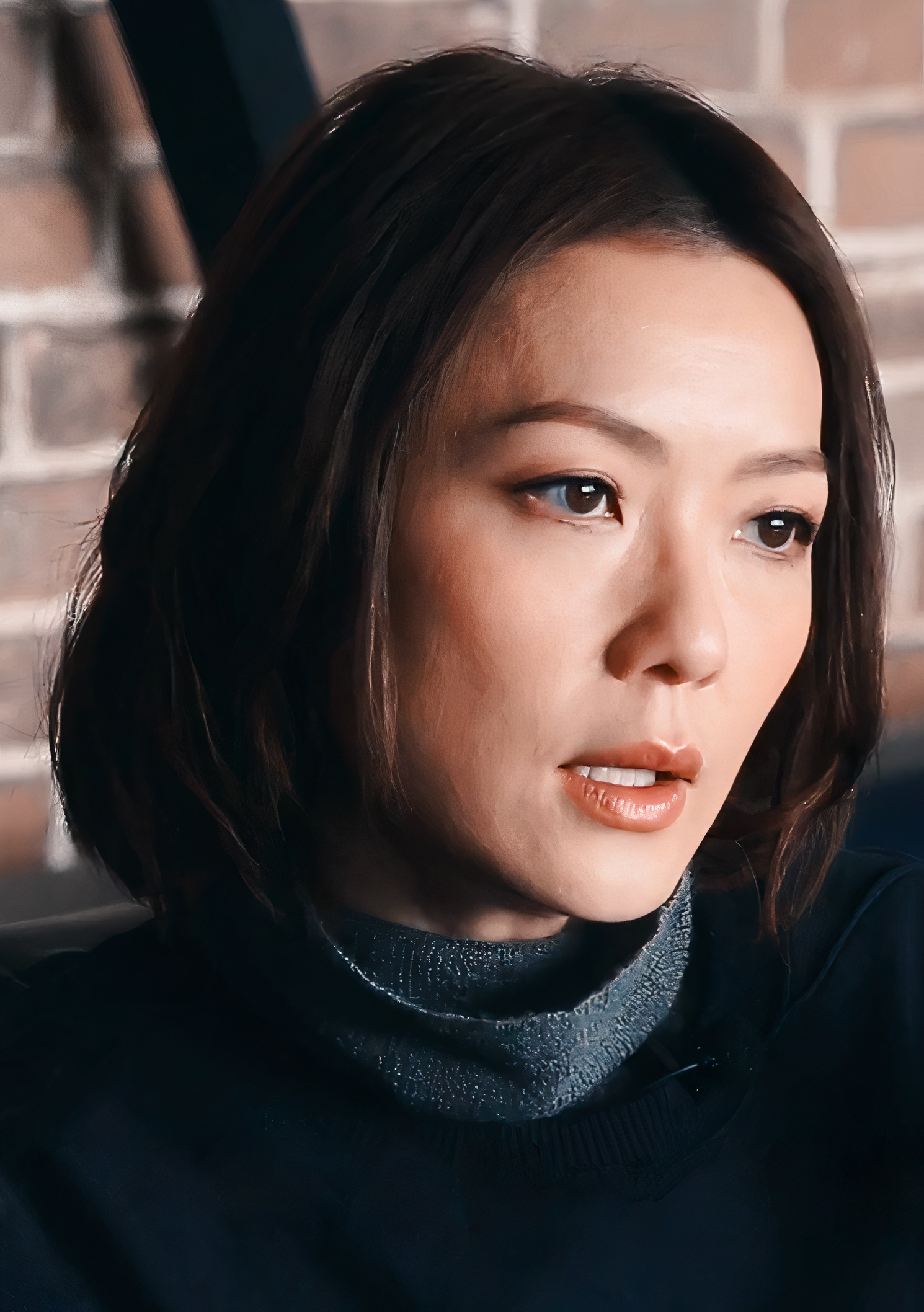
- Tin in 2013
- Born: Tin Ming Wai (田明慧); 28 September 1977 (age 48); British Hong Kong
- Occupations: Singer; actress
- Years active: 1995–present
- Agent: TVB (2006-2020)
- Spouse: Chapman To (m. 2005)
- Awards: TVB Anniversary Awards – Best Actress; 2013 Brother's Keeper; Most Popular Female Character; 2013 Brother's Keeper; 2015 Ghost of Relativity; Best Host; 2018 Pretty Forty Asian Television Awards – Best Drama Performance by an Actress (Highly Commended); 2015 Black Heart White Soul

Stage name
- Traditional Chinese: 田蕊妮
Transcriptions
Standard Mandarin
- Hanyu Pinyin: Tián Ruǐ Nī
Yue: Cantonese
- Jyutping: Tin4 Jeoi5 Nei4

Kristal Tin Yui Nei (Chinese: 田蕊妮; Jyutping: tin4 jeoi5 nei4, born 28 September 1977) is a Hong Kong singer and a former TVB actress.

== Career ==
Tin's career began with a first-place award in a singing contest in 1993. After the competition, she was offered a contract at Asia Television which she accepted. Two years later, Tin branched into acting through ATV.

In 2003, Tin decided to end her decade-long relationship with ATV. Her time with the network saw her winning two Hong Kong Film Awards for Best Actress. She then worked as a radio host at Commercial Radio Hong Kong.

Tin worked for TVB until her contract with TVB expired on 16 April 2020.

== Personal life ==
Tin was married to Chapman To in June 2005.

In 2024, Tin was diagnosed with early-stage lung adenocarcinoma and underwent surgery to remove the cancer in Taiwan.

== Filmography ==
=== Television ===
Year	Title	Role	Notes
1995	田蕊妮	Fei Fei	
1995	Justice Pao Ji Dip Ying Wei Hun		
1996	The Folk Tales		
1996	Jan Sheung		
1996	The Coma	Seung Fo	
1997	Coincidentally		
1997	等著你回來	Ho Dai Bo	
1998	Thou Shalt Not Cheat		
1998	Flaming Brothers	Cat	
1998	The Heroine of the Yangs	Yeung Man Gwong	
1999	The Mad Phoenix		
2000	Legend – A Dream Named Desire	Suen Lam Lam	
2000	Battlefield Network	Nga Mei Yi	
2000	Divine Retribution	Kei Siu Gwan	
2000	Hong Kong Yan Ga Yan		
2001	To Where He Belongs	Leui Ting	
2001	Su Dong Po	Sing Ping Gwan Jyu	
2001	非常好警	Lily	
2002	Son from the Past		
2002	No. 8 Bus	Sam Git Jing	
2002	Cheung Gung Fu Chai	Ling Mun Yuet	
2003	Light of Million Hope	Ko Gwai	
2003	子是故人來	Luk Yu Yan	
2007	Return Home	A Juan	
2007	Phoenix Rising	Kong Lai Nga	Warehoused and broadcast in 2008
2008	Love Exchange	Ching Ngo Yee (Jackie)	Nominated – TVB Award for Best Supporting Actress (Top 10)
2008	The Four	Kuk Yin Hung	
2009	In the Chamber of Bliss	Bak Sze-Ting	
2009	ICAC Investigators 2009	Lam Bui Kei	Guest star for episode 1
2009	Beyond the Realm of Conscience	Kong Choi King	Guest star for episode 1
2010	Some Day	Lam Jing-ling	
2010	Every Move You Make	Yip Chin-ting (Phoenix)	
2011	Only You	Phoebe Szeto	
2011	Be Home for Dinner	Sum Bui Yee	Nominated – TVB Anniversary Award for Best Actress (Top 15); Nominated – TVB Anniversary Award for My Favourite Female Character (Top 15)
2011	The Other Truth	Lee Miu-yee	Guest star
2012	No Good Either Way	Ling	
2012	King Maker	Yim Sam-leung	Nominated – TVB Anniversary Award for My Favourite Female Character (Top 10)
2013	The Song of Desert	Hong Gu	
2013	Brother's Keeper	Yiu Man-ying	Best Leading Actress in TVB 46th Anniversary Gala Popularity Vote TVB Award for Best Actress; Won – TVB Anniversary Award for Best Actress; Won – TVB Anniversary Award for My Favourite Female Character
2013–2014	Return of the Silver Tongue	Chan Chun-Chun	Performs theme song with Fred Cheng – "兩句" (Two Sentences)
2014	Black Heart White Soul	Tam Mei-ching	Nominated – TVB Anniversary Award for Best Actress (Top 5); Nominated – TVB Anniversary Award for My Favourite Female Character (Top 5)
2015	Ghost of Relativity	Suen Suk-mui	Won – TVB Anniversary Award for Most Popular Female Character; Nominated – TVB Anniversary Award for Best Actress (Top 5); Won – 2015 TVB Star Awards Malaysia – TVB Star Award for Favourite Actress; Won – 2015 TVB Star Awards Malaysia for TVB Favorite Drama Character (Top 16); Nominated – 2015 TVB Star Awards Malaysia – My Favorite TVB On-Screen Couple with Moses Chan; Won – StarHub TVB Award for My Favorite TVB Female Character – (Top 6); Nominated – StarHub TVB Award for My Favorite TVB Actress; Nominated – StarHub TVB Award for My Favorite TVB On-Screen Couple with Moses Chan
2015	Under the Veil	Dyun Fung-Sam/Dyun So-Sei	
2016	Brother's Keeper II	Yiu Man-ying	Nominated – TVB Anniversary Award for Best Actress (Top 5); Nominated – TVB Anniversary Award for My Favourite Female Character (Top 15); Won – StarHub TVB Award for My Favorite TVB Female Character – (Top 6)
2016	My Lover from the Planet Meow	Miu Miu-Miu	Won – 2016 TVB Star Awards Malaysia for TVB Favorite Drama Character (Top 16); Nominated – 2016 TVB Star Awards Malaysia – TVB Star Award for Favourite Actress (Top 5); Nominated – 2016 TVB Star Awards Malaysia – My Favorite TVB On-Screen Couple with Moses Chan and Nancy Wu
2017	Destination Nowhere	Kai Wing Yin	
2017	A General, A Scholar and A Eunuch	Jackie Fung Wai-chi	
2017	My Ages Apart	Ling Kit Yu	

=== Films ===
Year	Title	Role	Notes
2000	Queenie and King the Lovers	Queenie	
2000	The Blood Rules	Bo	
2000	The Temptation of Office Ladies	Crystal	
2000	Hong Kong Pie	Sexy	
2000	Clean My Name, Mr. Coroner!	Bobo Lam	
2001	Strangers Meet on the Way		
2001	La Brassiere	ballroom manager	
2001	Let's Sing Along	Kika Kwok	
2002	Possessed	Bobo	a.k.a. Demon Possession
2002	Ghost Office	Amanda	
2002	Golden Chicken	Madam A	
2003	1:99 Shorts		a.k.a. 1:99 Short Film Series
2003	Looking for Mister Perfect	Mrs. Chan	a.k.a. Looking for Mr. Perfect
2003	Golden Chicken 2	Madam A	
2004	Three of a Kind	Victoria	
2004	My Sweetie	Little Chin	
2005	Crazy n' the City	Madam Wu	
2005	Slim till Dead	Sisi	
2005	It Had to Be You!	Lisa	
2005	Wait 'til You're Older	policewoman	
2006	Super Kid	Chole King	a.k.a. Superkid
2006	My Mother Is a Belly Dancer	Mrs. Wong	Nominated – Hong Kong Film Award for Best Supporting Actress
2007	Dancing Lion		
2007	Trivial Matters	Professor Chan's wife	
2008	Chaos	Ling	
2008	A Decade of Love		
2009	Look for a Star	socialite at party	a.k.a. Looking for a Star
2009	Split Second Murders	Insurance Agent's Client	Guest star
2010	All's Well, Ends Well 2010	The Empress	
2011	Hong Kong Ghost Stories	Miss Kong	
2011	The Fortune Buddies		
2012	All's Well, Ends Well 2012		
2012	Love in the Buff		
2012	Vulgaria		
2016–2018	Shed Skin Papa	Yam Sa Sa	

=== Television presenting ===
Year	Title	Program type	Network	Notes
2010	The Voice 2	Reality show style singing competition	TVB	Co-hosting with Sammy Leung; Nominated – TVB Award for Best Host
2010	New Talent Singing Awards	Reality show style singing competition	TVB	
2011	Deja Love	Romance game show	TVB	Co-hosting with Margie Tsang
