= Aimee Chan =

Canadian actress

- Chan in 2019
- Born: Toronto, Ontario, Canada
- Years active: 2006–2015; 2022–present
- Spouse: Moses Chan (m. 2013)
- Children: 3
- Parent(s): Father: Chan Yim-sum; Mother: Ku Po-kwong
- Awards: TVB Anniversary Awards – Most Improved Female Artiste; 2009 Off Pedder; E.U.; Burning Flame III

Chinese name
- Traditional Chinese: 陳茵媺
- Simplified Chinese: 陈茵媺
Transcriptions
Standard Mandarin
- Hanyu Pinyin: Chén Yīnměi
Yue: Cantonese
- Jyutping: can4 jan1 mei4

Aimee Chan Yan-mei (Chinese: 陳茵媺) is a Canadian born actress based in Hong Kong. She was the winner of Miss Hong Kong 2006.

== Early life ==
Chan was born in Toronto, Ontario, Canada. Her parents were immigrants from Hong Kong. She began her modeling career at the age of 16.

== Career ==
After losing in the Miss Chinese Toronto pageant, Chan competed in the Miss Hong Kong Pageant in 2006. Though coming from Toronto, she went back to Hong Kong to compete. She made the top 21 of the Hong Kong group. After going into camp for 5 days training in Group C, she made the top 16. After filming with Seven in Korea, she competed on 12 August 2006 for the title. Though being a favorite, there were negative reports circulating about plastic surgery. Despite this she won the crown, audience favourite and won the Miss International Goodwill title as well.

== Personal life ==
Chan married Moses Chan in June 2013. The couple have three children: sons Aiden Joshua Chan (born 4 December 2013) and Nathan Lucas Chan (born 26 February 2015) and daughter Camilla Chan (born 27 April 2016).

== Filmography ==
=== TV dramas ===
Year	Title	Role	Notes
2008	Catch Me Now	Shum On-na (Nana)	
2008	Best Selling Secrets	Dai Ngan-loi	joined the cast in April 2008
2008-2010	Off Pedder	Chan Bo-lai (Paula)	TVB Award for Most Improved Actress
2009	E.U.	Jiu Wan-dik (Wendy)	TVB Award for Most Improved Actress
2009	Burning Flame III	Yung Siu-yee (Easy)	Nominated – TVB Award for Best Supporting Actress (Top 15); TVB Award for Most Improved Actress
2010	Some Day	Sek Ho-yee	Nominated - TVB Award for Best Supporting Actress (Top 15)
2010	Every Move You Make	Ching Bui-yee	
2011	The Other Truth	Iris Wong Yee-ting	Nominated — TVB Anniversary Award for Best Supporting Actress (Top 15); Episodes 8-10
2011	Super Snoops	Sheila Ling Miu-shat	
2011	Forensic Heroes III	Angel Chiang	Nominated — TVB Anniversary Award for My Favourite Female Character (Top 5)
2012	Master of Play	Cheung Sai-ting	
2012	The Last Steep Ascent	Tin Oi-tai	Nominated - TVB Anniversary Award for Best Actress (Top 10)
2012	The Confidant	Princess Wo-shek	Nominated - TVB Anniversary Award for Best Supporting Actress (Top 10)
2013	A Great Way to Care II	Jade Lai Yiu-chu	
2013	Slow Boat Home	Kate Cheng Po-po	
2014	Outbound Love	Law Sik-sik	TVB Star Award Malaysia for My Favourite On-Screen Couple
2014	Ruse of Engagement	Jessica Chung Yat-ka	
2014	Come Home Love	herself, Aimee Chan	
2023	Romeo and His Butterfly Lover	Zhu Ying-tai	Nominated - TVB Anniversary Award for Best Actress (Top 10); Nominated - TVB Anniversary Award for Favourite TVB Actress in Malaysia

=== Film ===
Year	Title	Role	Notes/Ref.
2010	72 Tenants of Prosperity	Survey staff	
2016	Let's Eat!	Rebecca	
2018	When Sun Meets Moon		

Achievements
Preceded by Tracy Ip	Miss Hong Kong; 2006	Succeeded by Kayi Cheung

Awards and achievements
TVB Anniversary Awards
Preceded by Nancy Wu for Wars of In-Laws II; D.I.E.; Legend of the Demigods; The Silver Chamber of Sorrows; Strictly Come Dancing II	Most Improved Actress; 2009 for Off Pedder; E.U.; Burning Flame III	Succeeded by Natalie Tong for A Watchdog's Tale; A Fistful of Stances; The Comeback Clan
