= TVB Star Award for Favourite Leading Performance =

The following is a list of the TVB Star Awards Malaysia winners and nominees for My Favourite TVB Actor and Actress in a Leading Role. It was first introduced in 2005 at the inaugural 2004 Astro Wah Lai Toi Drama Awards. The awards ceremony was renamed TVB Star Awards Malaysia in 2013.

== Winners and nominees ==
Table key
‡	Indicates a TVB Anniversary Award-winning performance

=== 2000s ===
Year	Category	Artist	Drama	Role(s)
2004
2004	Favourite Actor			
2004	Favourite Actor	Roger Kwok ‡	Square Pegs	Ding Sheung-wong
2004	Favourite Actor	Gallen Lo	Golden Faith	Ivan Ding
2004	Favourite Actor	Julian Cheung	Take My Word for It	Yeung Kwong
2004	Favourite Actor	Bobby Au-yeung	Armed Reaction IV	Inspector Chan Siu-sang
2004	Favourite Actor	Francis Ng	Triumph in the Skies	Samuel "Sam" Tong
2004	Favourite Actress			
2004	Favourite Actress	Flora Chan	Triumph in the Skies	Isabelle "Belle" Lok
2004	Favourite Actress	Jessica Hsuan	Square Pegs	Ling Choi-fung
2004	Favourite Actress	Nancy Sit	Virtues of Harmony	Yau Nim-chi
2004	Favourite Actress	Maggie Cheung Ho-yee ‡	The King of Yesterday and Tomorrow	Lui Sei-leung
2004	Favourite Actress	Joyce Tang	Armed Reaction IV	Inspector Chan Sam-yuen
2005
2005	Favourite Actor			
2005	Favourite Actor	Raymond Lam	Twin of Brothers	Kau Chung
2005	Favourite Actor	Julian Cheung	Point of No Return	Chow Tin-chi
2005	Favourite Actor	Dayo Wong	To Catch the Uncatchable	Detective Mok Chok-tung
2005	Favourite Actor	Roger Kwok	To Get Unstuck in Time	Inspector Ho Tin-kwong (Morning Sir)
2005	Favourite Actor	Bowie Lam ‡	War and Beauty	Suen Bak-yeung
2005	Favourite Actress			
2005	Favourite Actress	Charmaine Sheh	War and Beauty	Donggiya Yi-sun
2005	Favourite Actress	Ada Choi	To Catch the Uncatchable	Lee Wai-wai
2005	Favourite Actress	Sheren Tang ‡	War and Beauty	Niuhuru Yu-yuet
2005	Favourite Actress	Maggie Cheung Ho-yee	War and Beauty	Guwalgiya On-seen
2005	Favourite Actress	Gigi Lai ‡	War and Beauty	Hougiya Yuk-ying
2006
2006	Favourite Actor			
2006	Favourite Actor	Moses Chan	The Gentle Crackdown	Shui Tung-lau
2006	Favourite Actor	Julian Cheung	Shades of Truth	Ha Chung-yum
2006	Favourite Actor	Kevin Cheng	Yummy Yummy	Chan Ka-lok
2006	Favourite Actor	Bosco Wong	Wars of In-Laws	Ling Mau-chun
2006	Favourite Actor	Ron Ng	Revolving Doors of Vengeance	Wong Kai-kit
2006	Favourite Actress			
2006	Favourite Actress	Myolie Wu	Wars of In-Laws	Tin Lik
2006	Favourite Actress	Maggie Cheung Ho-yee	The Conqueror's Story	Lui Chi
2006	Favourite Actress	Charmaine Sheh	Yummy Yummy	Mandy Chow
2006	Favourite Actress	Liza Wang ‡	Wars of In-Laws	Hitara Sheok-lan
2006	Favourite Actress	Kenix Kwok	Revolving Doors of Vengeance	Becky Ku
2007
2007	Favourite Actor			
2007	Favourite Actor	Roger Kwok ‡	Life Made Simple	Ding Sheung-wong
2007	Favourite Actor	Raymond Lam	La Femme Desperado	Chai Foon
2007	Favourite Actor	Michael Tse	La Femme Desperado	Man King-leung
2007	Favourite Actor	Steven Ma	Safe Guards	Sheung Chi
2007	Favourite Actor	Moses Chan	Land of Wealth	Chai Pak-chuen / Fan Chi-chai
2007	Favourite Actress			
2007	Favourite Actress	Gigi Lai	The Dance of Passion	Kai Ming-fung
2007	Favourite Actress	Jessica Hsuan	Life Made Simple	Catherine Wong
2007	Favourite Actress	Sheren Tang	La Femme Desperado	Hilda Hoi
2007	Favourite Actress	Charmaine Sheh	The Dance of Passion	Ka Chun-fun
2007	Favourite Actress	Myolie Wu	War and Destiny	Ku Ping-on
2008
2008	Favourite Actor			
2008	Favourite Actor	Moses Chan ‡	Heart of Greed	Tong Chi-on
2008	Favourite Actor	Bobby Au-yeung	Dicey Business	Chai Foon-cheung
2008	Favourite Actor	Ha Yu	Heart of Greed	Tong Yan-kai
2008	Favourite Actor	Damian Lau	The Drive of Life	Wah Man-hon
2008	Favourite Actor	Raymond Lam	The Drive of Life	Wah Chun-bong
2008	Favourite Actress			
2008	Favourite Actress	Louise Lee ‡	Heart of Greed	Ling Hau
2008	Favourite Actress	Jessica Hsuan	Dicey Business	Ling Ching-wan
2008	Favourite Actress	Charmaine Sheh	The Drive of Life	Wing Sau-fung
2008	Favourite Actress	Susanna Kwan	Heart of Greed	Frances Wong
2008	Favourite Actress	Linda Chung	Heart of Greed	Sheung Joi-sum

=== 2010s ===
Year	Category	Artist	Drama	Role(s)
2010
2010	Favourite Actor			
2010	Favourite Actor	Moses Chan	Can't Buy Me Love	Kam Dor-luk
2010	Favourite Actor	Kenneth Ma	A Fistful of Stances	Ku Yu-tong
2010	Favourite Actor	Kevin Cheng	A Fistful of Stances	Ku Yu-cheung / Ku Kin-shing
2010	Favourite Actor	Bowie Lam	Sisters of Pearl	Ho Cheung-hing
2010	Favourite Actor	Steven Ma	Ghost Writer	Pu Songling
2010	Favourite Actor	Bobby Au-yeung	A Pillow Case of Mystery II	Sze Sai-lun
2010	Favourite Actor	Raymond Lam	Growing Through Life	Hanson Hoi
2010	Favourite Actor	Damian Lau	Growing Through Life	Albert Hoi
2010	Favourite Actor	Bosco Wong	Growing Through Life	Trevor Ho
2010	Favourite Actor	Wayne Lai ‡	No Regrets	Lau Sing
2010	Favourite Actress			
2010	Favourite Actress	Charmaine Sheh	Can't Buy Me Love	Princess Chiu-yeung
2010	Favourite Actress	Myolie Wu	A Chip Off the Old Block	So Fung-nei
2010	Favourite Actress	Christine Ng	The Beauty of the Game	Keung Chin-fung
2010	Favourite Actress	Ada Choi	Fly with Me	Ling Hau-chi
2010	Favourite Actress	Tavia Yeung	The Mysteries of Love	Tsui Siu-lai
2010	Favourite Actress	Linda Chung	Ghost Writer	Lau Sam-yu
2010	Favourite Actress	Fala Chen	Ghost Writer	Ling-gu Siu-chui
2010	Favourite Actress	Jessica Hsuan	A Pillow Case of Mystery II	Ng Kwan-yau
2010	Favourite Actress	Maggie Cheung Ho-yee	Beauty Knows No Pain	Jackie Sha
2010	Favourite Actress	Sheren Tang ‡	No Regrets	Cheng Kau-mui (Miss Kau)
2011
2011	Favourite Actor			
2011	Favourite Actor	Kevin Cheng ‡	Ghetto Justice	Law Lik-ah (Law Ba)
2011	Favourite Actor	Ruco Chan	The Other Truth	Keith Lau
2011	Favourite Actor	Michael Tse	Lives of Omission	SSGT Leung Siu-tong (Laughing)
2011	Favourite Actor	Raymond Lam	Men with No Shadows	Toi Fung
2011	Favourite Actor	Wayne Lai	Forensic Heroes III	Jack "Pro Sir" Po
2011	Favourite Actress			
2011	Favourite Actress	Myolie Wu ‡	Curse of the Royal Harem	Tunggiya Yuen-yuen
2011	Favourite Actress	Linda Chung	Yes, Sir. Sorry, Sir!	Koo Ka-lam (Miss Koo)
2011	Favourite Actress	Tavia Yeung	The Other Truth	Mavis Hong
2011	Favourite Actress	Fala Chen	Lives of Omission	WSIP Jodie "Madam Jo" Chau
2011	Favourite Actress	Maggie Cheung Ho-yee	Forensic Heroes III	Mandy Chung
2012
2012	Favourite Actor			
2012	Favourite Actor	Kenneth Ma	The Hippocratic Crush	Dr. Cheung Yat-kin
2012	Favourite Actor	Raymond Lam	Highs and Lows	Inspector Wai Sai-lok (Happy Sir)
2012	Favourite Actor	Moses Chan	Master of Play	Ivan Cheung
2012	Favourite Actor	Wayne Lai ‡	The Confidant	Li Lianying
2012	Favourite Actor	Bosco Wong	Witness Insecurity	Sam Hui
2012	Favourite Actress			
2012	Favourite Actress	Tavia Yeung	The Hippocratic Crush	Dr. Hong Tze-yu
2012	Favourite Actress	Charmaine Sheh	When Heaven Burns	Hazel Yip
2012	Favourite Actress	Myolie Wu	Ghetto Justice II	Kris Wong
2012	Favourite Actress	Kate Tsui	Highs and Lows	Pat Chan
2012	Favourite Actress	Linda Chung	Witness Insecurity	Hailey Kiu
2013
2013	Favourite Actor			
2013	Favourite Actor	Julian Cheung	Triumph in the Skies II	Jayden Koo (Captain Cool)
2013	Favourite Actor	Bosco Wong	A Change of Heart	Yiu Yat-san / Yiu Yuet-san
2013	Favourite Actor	Francis Ng	Triumph in the Skies II	Samuel "Sam" Tong
2013	Favourite Actor	Ruco Chan	Brother's Keeper	Sam Kiu Tin-seng
2013	Favourite Actor	Kenneth Ma	The Hippocratic Crush II	Dr. Cheung Yat-king
2013	Favourite Actress			
2013	Favourite Actress	Linda Chung	Brother's Keeper	Rachel Cheuk
2013	Favourite Actress	Fala Chen	Triumph in the Skies II	Holiday "Holly" Ho
2013	Favourite Actress	Myolie Wu	Triumph in the Skies II	Summer Ku
2013	Favourite Actress	Kristal Tin ‡	Brother's Keeper	Yiu Man-ying
2013	Favourite Actress	Tavia Yeung	The Hippocratic Crush II	Dr. Hong Tze-yu
2014
2014	Favourite Actor			
2014	Favourite Actor	Roger Kwok ‡	Black Heart White Soul	Matt Ko
2014	Favourite Actor	Ruco Chan	Outbound Love	Luk Kung-tsz
2014	Favourite Actor	Raymond Lam	Line Walker	Sit Ka-keung (Bao Seed)
2014	Favourite Actress			
2014	Favourite Actress	Charmaine Sheh ‡	Line Walker	Ding Siu-ka
2014	Favourite Actress	Linda Chung	All That is Bitter is Sweet	To Kai-kei
2014	Favourite Actress	Kate Tsui	Tomorrow is Another Day	Yiu Oi-ka
2015
2015	Favourite Actor			
2015	Favourite Actor	Ruco Chan	Captain of Destiny	Man-ho, the Eleventh Prince
2015	Favourite Actor	Louis Cheung	Momentary Lapse of Reason	Kam Wah
2015	Favourite Actor	Tony Hung	Captain of Destiny	Cheung Po Tsai
2015	Favourite Actress			
2015	Favourite Actress	Kristal Tin	Ghost of Relativity	May Suen
2015	Favourite Actress	Nancy Wu ‡	Ghost of Relativity	Gin Keung
2015	Favourite Actress	Linda Chung	Limelight Years	Szeto Tik-tik
2016
2016	Favourite Actor			
2016	Favourite Actor	Ruco Chan ‡	A Fist Within Four Walls	Chor Au-kuen
2016	Favourite Actor	Bobby Au-yeung	House of Spirits	Po Foon
2016	Favourite Actor	Benjamin Yuen	A Fist Within Four Walls	Duen Ying-fung
2016	Favourite Actor	Alex Fong Chung-sun	Law dis-Order	Kent Cheung Keung
2016	Favourite Actor	Liu Kai-chi	Law dis-Order	CK Lau Chan-keung
2016	Favourite Actress			
2016	Favourite Actress	Nancy Wu ‡	A Fist Within Four Walls	Tiu Lan
2016	Favourite Actress	Tracy Chu	Over Run Over	WSGT Ling San-fung
2016	Favourite Actress	Ali Lee	Law dis-Order	Hazel Cheuk Yee-chung
2016	Favourite Actress	Mandy Wong	Law dis-Order	Martha Fong Ling
2016	Favourite Actress	Kristal Tin	My Lover from the Planet Meow	Miu Miu-miu
2017
2017	Favourite Actor			
2017	Favourite Actor	Michael Miu	Line Walker: The Prelude	Cheuk Hoi
2017	Favourite Actor	Vincent Wong	Legal Mavericks	Man Sun-hap
2017	Favourite Actor	Ruco Chan	The Unholy Alliance	Ko Tsz-kit
2017	Favourite Actress			
2017	Favourite Actress	Jessica Hsuan	My Unfair Lady	Molly Ling Man
2017	Favourite Actress	Ali Lee	Legal Mavericks	Cherry "Never" Wong Lai-fan
2017	Favourite Actress	Nancy Wu	The Unholy Alliance	Yuen Tsing-yan
