= TVB Star Award for Favourite Drama =

This is a list of the TVB Star Awards Malaysia winners and nominees for My Favourite TVB Drama Series. It was first introduced in 2005 at the inaugural 2004 Astro Wah Lai Toi Drama Awards. The awards ceremony was renamed TVB Star Awards Malaysia in 2013.

== Winners and nominees ==
Table key
| ‡ | Indicates dramas that won TVB Anniversary Award for Best Drama |

=== 2000s ===
| Year | Nominees | Producer(s) | Ref |
|---|---|---|---|
| 2004 | Square Pegs | Wong Wai-sing | |
| 2004 | Golden Faith | Tommy Leung | |
| 2004 | Triumph in the Skies | Poon Ka-tak | |
| 2004 | Armed Reaction IV | Kwong Yip-sang | |
| 2004 | Take My Word for It | Kwong Yip-sang | |
| 2005 | War and Beauty | Jonathan Chik | |
| 2005 | Point of No Return | Lee Tim-sing | |
| 2005 | To Catch the Uncatchable | Steven Tsui | |
| 2005 | To Get Unstuck in Time | Lam Chi-wah | |
| 2005 | Twin of Brothers | Chong Wai-kin | |
| 2006 | Wars of In-Laws ‡ | Kwan Wing-chung | |
| 2006 | The Last Breakthrough | Lam Chi-wah | |
| 2006 | The Conqueror's Story | Lee Tim-sing | |
| 2006 | Healing Hands III | Jonathan Chik | |
| 2006 | Revolving Doors of Vengeance | Poon Ka-tak | |
| 2007 | Forensic Heroes | Mui Siu-ching | |
| 2007 | Life Made Simple | Wong Wai-sing | |
| 2007 | La Femme Desperado ‡ | Poon Ka-tak | |
| 2007 | Safe Guards | Lee Tim-sing | |
| 2007 | Land of Wealth | Leung Choi-yuen | |
| 2008 | Heart of Greed ‡ | Lau Ka-ho | |
| 2008 | The Brink of Law | Mui Siu-ching | |
| 2008 | Dicey Business | Nelson Cheung | |
| 2008 | On the First Beat | Wong Wai-sing | |
| 2008 | The Drive of Life | Tommy Leung, Poon Ka-tak | |

=== 2010s ===
| Year | Nominees | Producer(s) | Ref. |
|---|---|---|---|
| 2010 | Can't Buy Me Love ‡ | Mui Siu-ching | |
| 2010 | A Fistful of Stances | Lee Tim-sing | |
| 2010 | Fly with Me | Jonathan Chik | |
| 2010 | The Mysteries of Love | Lau Ka-ho | |
| 2010 | Ghost Writer | Leung Choi-yuen | |
| 2010 | A Pillow Case of Mystery II | Lam Chi-wah | |
| 2010 | Beauty Knows No Pain | Lam Chi-wah | |
| 2010 | Growing Through Life | Tommy Leung, Chen Liang, Lu Shuchao, Raymond Chai | |
| 2010 | Every Move You Make | Tsui Yu-on | |
| 2010 | No Regrets | Lee Tim-sing | |
| 2011 | Ghetto Justice | Terry Tong | |
| 2011 | The Other Truth | Amy Wong | |
| 2011 | Lives of Omission ‡ | Chong Wai-kin | |
| 2011 | Men with No Shadows | Poon Ka-tak | |
| 2011 | Forensic Heroes III | Mui Siu-ching | |
| 2012 | The Hippocratic Crush | Poon Ka-tak | |
| 2012 | Witness Insecurity | Lau Ka-ho | |
| 2012 | The Last Steep Ascent | Lee Tim-sing | |
| 2012 | Highs and Lows | Lam Chi-wah | |
| 2012 | The Confidant | Marco Law | |
| 2013 | Triumph in the Skies II ‡ | Sharon Au, Joe Chan | |
| 2013 | Inbound Troubles | Wong Wai-sing | |
| 2013 | Brother's Keeper | Amy Wong | |
| 2013 | Will Power | Steven Tsui | |
| 2013 | The Hippocratic Crush II | Poon Ka-tak | |
| 2014 | Line Walker ‡ | Jazz Boon | |
| 2014 | Outbound Love | Dave Fong | |
| 2014 | Tomorrow is Another Day | Lam Chi-wah | |
| 2015 | Captain of Destiny | Leung Choi-yuen | |
| 2015 | Limelight Years | Chong Wai-kin | |
| 2015 | Lord of Shanghai ‡ | Amy Wong | |
| 2016 | A Fist Within Four Walls ‡ | Jazz Boon | |
| 2016 | House of Spirits | Dave Fong | |
| 2016 | Law dis-Order | Marco Law | |
| 2017 | Legal Mavericks | Lam Chi-wah | |
| 2017 | The Unholy Alliance | Jazz Boon | |
| 2017 | Line Walker: The Prelude | So Man-chung | |
