= 2005 Astro Wah Lai Toi Drama Awards =

- Date: 7 January 2006
- Location: Sunway Pyramid

Television/radio coverage
- Network: Astro Wah Lai Toi
- Produced by: Astro, TVB

The 2005 Astro Wah Lai Toi Drama Awards (simplified Chinese: Astro华丽台电视剧大奖2005; traditional Chinese: Astro華麗臺電視劇大獎2005), presented by Astro in Malaysia, was an awards ceremony that recognises the best Hong Kong television programmes that had aired on Malaysia's Astro Wah Lai Toi in 2005.

The ceremony took place on 7 January 2006 at the Sunway Pyramid in Kuala Lumpur, Malaysia. It was televised live on Astro's Cantonese channel, Astro Wah Lai Toi.

== Winners and nominees ==
Winners are 100% based on popular vote. Top five nominees are in bold.

My Favourite Actor in a Leading Role	My Favourite Actress in a Leading Role
**Raymond Lam as Kau Chung in Twin of Brothers**; **Julian Cheung as Chow Tin-chi in Point of No Return**; **Dayo Wong as Mok Chok-tung in To Catch the Uncatchable**; **Roger Kwok as Ho Tin-kwong (Morning Sir) in To Get Unstuck In Time**; **Bowie Lam as Sun Bak-yeung in War and Beauty**; Damian Lau as Chow Ming-hin in Point of No Return; Kevin Cheng as Ken Leung in Hard Fate; Moses Chan as Hung Mo in War and Beauty; Alex Fong as Fung Chi-wai in Split Second; Ron Ng as Tsui Chi-ling in Twin of Brothers	**Charmaine Sheh as Donggiya Yi-sun in War and Beauty**; **Ada Choi as Lee Wai-wai in To Catch the Uncatchable**; **Sheren Tang as Niuhuru Yu-yuet in War and Beauty**; **Maggie Cheung Ho-yee as Guwalgiya On-seen in War and Beauty**; **Gigi Lai as Hougiya Yuk-ying in War and Beauty**; Amy Kwok as Kam Yuk in To Love with No Regrets; Myolie Wu as Michelle Ku in Dream of Colours; Kenix Kwok as Wong Yeuk-sze in Shine On You; Jessica Hsuan as Fan Lei-fa in Lady Fan; Flora Chan as Ko Shan in To Get Unstuck In Time
My Favourite Drama	My Top 12 Favourite Characters
**War and Beauty**; Point of No Return; To Catch the Uncatchable; To Get Unstuck In Time; Twin of Brothers	Raymond Lam as Kau Chung in Twin of Brothers; Ron Ng as Tsui Chi-ling in Twin of Brothers; Julian Cheung as Chau Tin-chi in Point of No Return; Myolie Wu as Ku Lok-man in Dream of Colours; Kevin Cheng as Ken Leung in Hard Fate; Ada Choi as Lee Wai-wai in To Catch the Uncatchable; Dayo Wong as Mok Chok-tung in To Catch the Uncatchable; Roger Kwok as Ho Tin-kwong (Morning Sir) in To Get Unstuck In Time; Sheren Tang as Niuhuru Yu-yuet in War and Beauty; Gigi Lai as Hougiya Yuk-ying in War and Beauty; Maggie Cheung Ho-yee as Guwalgiya On-seen in War and Beauty; Charmaine Sheh as Donggiya Yi-sun in War and Beauty
My Favourite Drama Theme Song	My Favourite On-Screen Couple
**"Love Without Dreams" (相爱无梦) by Julian Cheung — Point of No Return**; "The Wind Can't Blow Away Your Smile" (风吹不走笑容) by Candy Lo — Lady Fan; "Who's the Worst" (衰边个) by Dayo Wong — To Catch the Uncatchable; "Sons and Daughters" (儿女) by Bowie Lam — War and Beauty; "Twin Dragons" (双子龙) by Raymond Lam — Twin of Brothers	**Charmaine Sheh and Julian Cheung in Point of No Return**; Niki Chow and Kevin Cheng in Hard Fate; Ada Choi and Dayo Wong in To Catch the Uncatchable; Maggie Cheung Ho-yee and Moses Chan in War and Beauty; Gigi Lai and Bowie Lam in War and Beauty
My Favourite Gunshot	My Favourite Beauty
**Wong He as Yiu Sin-tin in Net Deception**; Kwong Wa as Wing Man-tung in Riches and Stitches; Flora Chan as Ko Shan / Ding Chi-wan in To Get Unstuck In Time; Alex Fong as Fung Chi-wai in Split Second; Kevin Cheng as Vincent Wong in Split Second	**Gigi Lai as Hougiya Yuk-ying in War and Beauty**; Sharon Chan as Ella Kwan in Dream of Colours; Flora Chan as Ko Shan / Ding Chi-wan in To Get Unstuck In Time; Yang Xue as Szema Ping-ting in Blade Heart; Charmaine Sheh as Donggiya Yi-sun in War and Beauty
My Favourite Father-figure	My Favourite Mother-figure
**Damian Lau as Chow Ming-hin in Point of No Return**; Adam Cheng as Ding Kwai-mui in The Driving Power; Ha Yu as Mok Sai-lung in Hard Fate; Benz Hui as Ho Dai-ho in To Get Unstuck In Time; Chan Hung-lit as Sun Ching-wah in War and Beauty	**Christine Ng as Fu Kwan-cheuk in Twin of Brothers**; Cecilia Yip as Lok Fu-yung in The Driving Power; Angie Chiu as Ng Yuk-hing in Point of No Return; Jessica Hsuan as Kuk Wai-ting in A Handful of Love; Suet Nei as Lau Tai in To Catch the Uncatchable
My Most Unforgettable Scene	
**The death of the little princess — Sheren Tang in War and Beauty**; Chow Ming-hin announces Ng Yuk-hing as his wife — Point of No Return; Lee Wai-wai falls in love with Mok Chok-tung — To Catch the Uncatchable; Lau Pak-yin falls to his death — Hard Fate; On-seen follows Hung-mo's footsteps in the snow — War and Beauty	
