= List of The Other Truth episodes =

Screenshot of a TV advertisement for The Other Truth, depicting the main characters in blindfolds like Lady Justice.

The Other Truth is a 2011 television legal drama serial set and filmed in Hong Kong. Produced by Television Broadcasts Limited (TVB), Amy Wong serves as the drama's executive producer with Kwan Chung-ling as the head writer. The Other Truth premiered on 27 June 2011, airing five days a week at 9:30 pm (HKT) on the TVB Jade and TVB HD Jade channels in Hong Kong. A total of 25 episodes were produced.

The drama revolves around a group of young barristers and solicitors working in Clayton Hau Chamber and Wallace Cheuk & Co. Solicitors, two fictional law firms in Central, Hong Kong. The Other Truth focuses on ambiguous criminal and civil cases with disputable truths, highlighting the lawyers' strive for impartiality and blind justice. The criminals and victims often play prominent roles in their episodes.

== List of court cases ==
=== Patricide (弒父): Episodes 1–3 ===
Case type: Criminal
Prosecutor: Government of Hong Kong
Defendant: Ho Wai-chung
Charges: Murder
Prosecution Counsel: Barrister Man of the Department of Justice
Defendant Counsel: Barrister Keith Lau

Fong Siu-lan (Louise Lee) has been under the psychological torment of her abusive husband Ho King-wai (Wong Ching) for many years. She tries filing a complaint against her husband for domestic violence, but loses the court case. In order to escape Wai's wrath, Lan and her son Ho Wai-chung (Brian Chu) move out of their apartment. Wai follows Chung to school, resulting in Chung to often skip school to evade his father. One day, Wai violently attacks Lan and forcefully takes nude pictures of her, threatening her to stay. To protect his mother, Chung kills his father.

=== Uncle Files an Appeal (阿伯要上訴): Episodes 5–7 ===
Case type: Civil
Prosecutor: Government of Hong Kong
Defendant: Tam Wai-tung
Charges: Illegal employment
Prosecution Counsel: Unknown
Defendant counsel: Barrister James Wai

Tam Wai-tung (Benz Hui) is put to seven days in jail for hiring an illegal worker. After finishing his sentence, he files an appeal, claiming that he is innocent.

=== A Star's Rape Case (阿星強姦案): Episodes 8–10 ===
Case type: Criminal
Prosecutor: Government of Hong Kong
Defendant Counsel: Barrister Gill
Charges: Rape
Prosecution counsel:Barrister Mavis Hong

Rising television actress Iris Wong (Aimee Chan) is raped by Manpreet Chima (Bitto), an Indian Hong Kong resident. A jury of seven different individuals, including James' mother Lai (Angelina Lo), carefully discuss the guilt or innocence of the defendant on the basis of reasonable doubt. TVB received six complains of racial discrimination from audience members about the use of the anti-South Asian slur "Ah Cha" in the show's dialogue.

=== Duplicitous Mother (蛇心慈母): Episodes 11–16 ===
Cheng Suk-kuen (Helen Ma), Keith's mother, was accused by Tsui Yuen-mei (Rosanne Lui) of attempted murder. Cheng's charge was dismissed finally and Tsui later committed suicide. Ivy (Leanne Li), Tsui's daughter and Keith's half-sister, retaliated on Cheng for her mother's death.

=== Kill the Cop (殺警): Episodes 16–19 ===
Police Chief Inspector Yam Kwok-chu (Felix Lok) and his subordinates were bribed by a triad leader Lam Chau (Wong Chun-tong). In order not to disclose their crimes, Turkey (Daniel Kwok), one of Yam's subordinates, killed police officer Tam Wai-chiu (Au Siu-wai) and drug trafficker Chiu Wai-kong (Billy Kong), and imputed the murder to Chiu and another trafficker Ben Wong (Matt Yeung). Wallace was a witness of the murder.

=== Collecting Debts (收數): Episodes 21–25 ===
Alex Kong (Kenneth Ma) is an accountant and develops a relationship with Cecilia. Alex has a close relationship with Brother Lui - a triad boss. Brother Lui passes away, and the police charges Alex and Short Kan - one of the men under brother Lui, for being involved on planning a murder of another triad boss. Cecilia turns to Keith to become Alex's lawyer, and claims he's innocent. After all the relevant evidence that proves Alex's innocence, Cecilia discovers small clues that show that Alex is guilty. Nothing could be done to get Alex into jail. Hence, Alex is released from custody. However, Cecilia breaks up with Alex.

Cecilia later finds out the story has not ended, and her life ends in tragedy. Keith, Mavis, and Wallace start to collect evidence of Alex's illegal deals with Window. Mavis holds the USB with all the evidence to get Window and Alex in jail. Alex arranges a burglary for the chamber. Alex fails to find the USB, he then leads Keith and Wallace into following Window and Alex to a nearby alley and get kidnapped.

=== Minor cases ===
The armed burglary case (Episode 1)

An armed police officer is accused of robbery. Features Keith Lau as the Defendant Counsel.

The showroom toilet case (Episode 1)

Michael (Brian Burrell), Mavis Hong's ex-husband, mistook a restroom showroom exhibition as an actual restroom and is charged with destruction of property. Features Mavis Hong as the Defendant Counsel.

Prenuptial agreement case (Episode 2)

Emily Yu (Mandy Lam) files suit against her fiancé Peter Leung (Ko Chun-man) for violating their prenuptial agreements. Features Mavis Hong as the Defendant Counsel.

Forged document case (Episode 3)

Mary Yu (Jess Sum) files a complaint against her friend Chow Chi-ching (Candy Cheung) for forging a trust fund document. Features Wallace Cheuk as the Defendant Counsel.

In Love with My Teacher (Episode 4)

A high school student Cheung Wing-shan (Cilla Kung) falls in love with her teacher Chu Wing-fai (Cheung Tat-lun), who is being charged with raping her. Features Mavis Hong as the Prosecution Counsel.

Medical malpractice (Episode 5)

Siu Man-wai (Rebecca Chan), a doctor and Wallace's mother, is being sued by Ma Wing-fu (Wilson Tsui) for medical malpractice in the matter of Mrs. Ma's death. Features Wallace Cheuk as the Defendant Counsel.

Watch company corruption (Episode 5–7)

Ma Wing-choi (Cheng Shu-fung) and Cheuk Kai-hong (Chun Wong) are charged with corruption by ICAC. The case was reported by Ma Wing-fu, Ma Wing-choi's brother, who wants to take over Ma Wing-choi's watch company business. Features Wallace Cheuk as the Defendant Counsel.

Bar wounding assault (Episode 8–11)

Michael, Mavis Hong's ex-husband, was accused of injuring Paula in a bar.

Serial robberies (Episode 11–12)

Ho Lik-kei was accused as another theft who had similar appearance with Ho involved in serial robberies.

Chow Man murder (Episode 17-20)

Siu Fuk (Mak Cheung-ching) and Chow Man (Claire Yiu) decided to divorce, and battle for custody of their two children. Chow Man was later mistakenly killed by Siu Fuk. Features Mavis Hong and Keith Lau as the Defendant Counsel.

Prostitution (Episode 21)

Hung Cham (Yu Tsz-ming), a Chaoshanese who could only speak Chaoshan dialect, was mistakenly arrested by a policewoman Lee Miu-yee (Kristal Tin) for prostitution. Features James Wai as the Defendant Counsel.

== List of episodes ==
No.	Title	Directed by	Written by	Original release date
1	"Keith rescues abused wife and her son (思傑拯救 被虐母子)"	Au Yiu-hing	Story by : Kwan Chung-ling; Teleplay by : Kwan Chung-ling	27 June 2011
A teenage boy, Ho Wai-chung (Brian Chu) is arrested for murdering his father Ho King-wai (Wong Ching). Three years prior, Fong Siu-lan (Louise Lee), Wai's wife, filed a complaint against Wai for domestic abuse, but Keith, who was the defendant counsel at the time, got him off on the charges. In a life or death situation, Lan begs Keith to save her son, which Keith readily agrees.: Irene Wong also guest stars.
2	"Cecilia becomes Mavis' pupil (巧如欲投 芷欣門下)"	Au Yiu-hing	Kwan Ping-hung	28 June 2011
Lan confesses to Keith that she is actually the murderer of her husband. Meanwhile, Mavis, a barrister who is also employed at Clayton Hau Chamber with Keith, accepts a new pupil Cecilia, an enthusiastic law intern. Keith's indolent best friend Wallace, the owner of Wallace Cheuk & Co. Solicitors, a floor above Clayton Hau Chamber, accepts his first court case in order to impress Mavis.: Mandy Lam and Rachel Kan guest stars.
3	"A fierce statement for justice (為表公義 激烈陳詞)"	Au Yiu-hing	Leung Kar-ming	29 June 2011
In order to prove Wai's ongoing abusive nature towards Lan and Chung, Keith decides to use a tape he recorded of Wai's testimony three years ago as evidence in court, breaching the confidentiality agreement. After more investigating, Keith discovers that the cause of Wai's death is not as apparent as it seems.: Candy Cheung, Benjamin Yuen, Jess Sum, and Patrick Dunn guest stars.
4	"Keith and James help an elderly woman (思傑文瀚 義助婆婆)"	Kwan Man-sam	Cheung Chung-yan and Cheng Shing-mo	30 June 2011
Unsatisfied with his office conditions and with no jobs, James, Keith's good friend and classmate during law school, asks Keith if he can rent an office space at Clayton Hau Chamber so he can get "luckier." At the same time, Mavis is given a case to prosecute a high school teacher (Cheung Tat-lun) who is charged with statutory rape, with her father (Lau Dan) being the High Court judge.: Cilla Kung also guest stars.
5	"James meets Wai-tung suffering grievances (文瀚遇上 偉通伸冤)"	Kwan Man-sam	Yuen Suet-yee	1 July 2011
Keith is sentenced to a hearing for breaching the confidentiality agreement in the "Patricide" case. Wallace invites Clayton, Keith's mentor, back from vacation in order to help Keith. James meets a man, Tam Wai-tung (Benz Hui), protesting against the government in the streets. Wai-tung has just finished serving seven days of jail for a crime he did not commit. After hearing Wai-tung's grievances, James decided to help. In the meantime, Wallace's mother is being sued for medical malpractice.: Chan On-ying and Wilson Tsui also guest stars.
6	"The witness fails to show up, losing the case (證人失約 勝算大減)"	Kwan Man-sam	Leung Kar-ming and Kwan Bing-hung	4 July 2011
Wallace's father, Kai-hong, is being investigated by the ICAC for corruption, but he claims to be innocent. Wallace, defending his father, finds a strong witness that will help his father in court, but the witness fails to show up. As a result, the court finds Kai-hong guilty of corruption. Meanwhile, Wai-tung's wife convinces James to not file for appeal because it is too costly for their family, but Wai-tung insists James to help him.
7	"Clayton suffers from memory loss, Keith comes to the rescue (伯勤失憶 思傑解圍)"	Ng Shiu-wing	Cheng Sing-mo and Cheung Chung-yan	5 July 2011
As one of Kai-hong's good friends, Clayton decides to help him appeal. However, Clayton soon realises that his short-term memory is fading, and that he is diagnosed with an early stage of Alzheimer's disease.

== See also ==
- The Other Truth
- List of The Other Truth characters
