= Song Wenfei =

Chinese actress

- Born: Song Wenting; 30 May 1985; Guangzhou, China
- Died: 3 March 2013 (aged 27); Guangzhou, China
- Occupation: Actress
- Years active: 2008–2013
- Spouse: Li Daan (husband)

Song Wenfei (30 May 1985 – 3 March 2013), also known as "Song Wenting" or "Vionn Song", was a Chinese actress. She is famous for her major role in the TV series Dancer by the famous Chinese writer Haiyan. She died of uterine cancer on 3 March 2013.

== Filmography ==
- Dancer (2008)
- In that Distant Place (2009)
- Growing Through Life (2010)
- Princess Show (2013)
