= Dream of Colours =

- Promo poster
- 下一站彩虹
- Genre: Modern Drama
- Starring: Myolie Wu; Melissa Ng; Tse Kwan Ho; Kenneth Ma; Sharon Chan; Rain Li
- Opening theme: "我在橋上看風景" by Rain Li
- Country of origin: Hong Kong
- Original language: Cantonese
- No. of episodes: 20

Production
- Producer: Terry Tong
- Running time: 45 minutes (approx.)

Original release
- Network: TVB
- Release: 26 April – 21 May 2004

Dreams of Colours (Chinese: 下一站彩虹) is a Hong Kong television series starring Myolie Wu, Tse Kwan-ho, and Melissa Ng. It was released on 16 April 2004 by TVB.

== Background ==
The television series had 20 episodes and aired daily from Monday through Friday at 8:00pm on TVB Jade between 26 April 2004 and 21 May 2004.

== Plot ==
The series begins with a slightly disturbed Michelle Koo (Myolie Wu) travelling back to home on a flight. She was accompanied by her friend Donna. Donna told her to relax and gave her some wine to drink. When Donna looked back at the other passengers she identified Nick Yau. While noticing him, she became very excited and went over talking with him a lot, even asked him what could she wear. Meanwhile, Michelle got drunk but still wanted some more. She got some more and went over to where Donna and Nick Yau were chatting. Drunk Michelle spilt her wine over some cloth on Nick Yau's lap. Nick's cloth was very special to him because he was going to make a dress for Elaine, his girlfriend. When Michelle finally got home she faced her furious father who is very disappointed about her. In the course of time, Michelle became friends with FeiFei (Rain Li), and Ella (Sharon Chan).

Somehow, they all ended up working in Nee, a famous clothing brand. Nee was famous primarily because of Nick Yau (Tse Kwan Ho). Coincidentally, Nick Yau was also Michelle's grandfather's student. Pulling the strings, Michelle managed to get a job at Nee. However, she was employed only to help out with making coffee, photocopying things and other miscellaneous things. Then, Ella was selected for a scholarship to pursue study in fashion designing. However, because of their getting trapped in a lift, Ella became late and could not secure the scholarship. For failing to secure the scholarship, Ella became heartbroken. In this situation, FeiFei and Michelle decided to help to get her a job at Nee. And the three friends finally got united at Nee. Michelle noticed that her two best friends always attending meetings at Nee. She wished to join them as well. She tried her best to learn and became skilled. Finally Nick allowed her to attend meetings as well. Soon, Ella started to feel jealous as she realizes that Michelle's ideas are accepted most of the time instead of hers. Out of her envy, She started to trick Michelle.

Meanwhile, Michelle eventually becomes a student of Nick Yau. Elaine (Melissa Ng) who had been dating Nick Yau for more than 10 years, finally decided to break up with him as she feels that Nick Yau would be better off with Michelle. Eventually, this became true and Michelle and Nick Yau started to date. However, this was only shown in episode 20, the last one. For a more pleasant ending, it showed how Ella decided to change for the better and how she worked hard with Michelle and she finally secured a scholarship to study fashion designing. This series ends with a scene at the departure hall of Hong Kong Airport. In the end scene, Nick says that he would wait for Michelle to return.

== Cast ==
- Myolie Wu as Michelle Koo
- Tse Kwan-ho as Nick Yau
- Melissa Ng as Elaine Poon
- Sharon Chan as Ella Kwan
- Rain Li as Phoebe Lui
- Lai Lok-yi as Koo Lok Man
- Kenneth Ma as Lui Siu Lung

== Reception ==
In a positive review, Youth Times said, "Dreams of Colours is different from sad Korean dramas. It is full of positive vigor and delicately depicts family, love, and friendship from multiple angles, highlighting the courage and optimism of young people who never give up in their entrepreneurship and persistent spirit."
