= List of Ghost Writer episodes =

The television series Ghost Writer ran for 25 episodes and was broadcast on TVB Jade in the second line series from June 7 to July 9, 2010.

== Episodes ==
No.	Title	Original release date	Repeat telecast
1	"Episode 1"	June 7, 2010	October 3, 2012 at 11.45am
2	"Episode 2"	June 8, 2010	October 4, 2012
3	"Episode 3"	June 9, 2010	October 5, 2012
4	"Episode 4"	June 10, 2010	October 8, 2012
5	"Episode 5"	June 11, 2010	October 9, 2012
6	"Episode 6"	June 14, 2010	October 10, 2012
7	"Episode 7"	June 15, 2010	October 11, 2012
8	"Episode 8"	June 16, 2010	October 12, 2012
9	"Episode 9"	June 17, 2010	October 15, 2012
10	"Episode 10"	June 18, 2010	October 16, 2012
11	"Episode 11"	June 21, 2010	October 18, 2012
12	"Episode 12"	June 22, 2010	October 19, 2012
13	"Episode 13"	June 23, 2010	October 22, 2012
14	"Episode 14"	June 24, 2010	October 23, 2012
15	"Episode 15"	June 28, 2010	October 24, 2012
16	"Episode 16"	June 29, 2010	October 25, 2012
17	"Episode 17"	June 30, 2010	October 26, 2012
18	"Episode 18"	July 1, 2010	October 29, 2012
19	"Episode 19"	July 2, 2010	October 30, 2012
20	"Episode 20"	July 5, 2010	October 31, 2012
21	"Episode 21"	July 6, 2010	November 1, 2012
22	"Episode 22"	July 7, 2010	November 2, 2012
23	"Episode 23"	July 8, 2010	November 5, 2012
24	"Episodes 24"	July 9, 2010	November 6, 2012 at 10.30am
25	"Episode 25 (Finale)"	July 9, 2010	November 6, 2012 at 10.30am

== See also ==
- List of TVB dramas in 2010
- Ghost Writer
