= List of The Other Truth characters =

Promotional poster. From left to right: Danny Mo, Keith Lau, Mavis Hong, Wallace Cheuk, James Wai, and Cecilia Pun.

The Other Truth is a 2011 television legal drama serial set and filmed in Hong Kong. Produced by TVB, the drama was created by Amy Wong, with Kwan Chung-ling as the executive writer/editor. The Other Truth centers around a team of barristers and solicitors working for Clayton Hau Chamber and Wallace Cheuk & Co. Solicitors, two fictional law firms located in Central, Hong Kong. The Other Truth focuses on ambiguous criminal and civil cases with disputable truths, highlighting the lawyers' strive for impartiality and blind justice. The criminals and victims often play vital roles in their episodes.

== Clayton Hau Chamber ==
=== Clayton Hau ===
Clayton Hau Pak-kan (侯伯勤; jyutping: Hau Baakkan), portrayed by Chung King-fai, is a retired High Court judge, owner of Clayton Hau Chamber, and the pupilmaster of barrister Keith Lau. At the start of drama, Clayton is vacationing in Australia, leaving behind Keith to run errands for his chamber. In episode five, Wallace invites Clayton back from vacation so he can be a witness to Keith's hearing, who is on the verge of having his lawyer license revoked. Clayton has been good friends with Wallace's parents for many years. Although already retired, Clayton returns to work to defend Wallace's father in a corruption lawsuit. After Clayton is diagnosed with an early stage of Alzheimer's disease, Clayton is forced to withdraw from the case, and Keith replaces his position. In episode eight, Clayton tells Keith that he will permanently reside in Australia with his wife, telling Keith that although he may one day forget him, he always saw Keith as his own son.

=== Keith Lau ===
Keith Lau Sz-kit (劉思傑; Lau Sigit), portrayed by Ruco Chan, is one of the three barristers at Clayton Hau Chamber and the mentor of Norman Shum and Cecilia Pun. Ambitious, fearless, but righteous, Keith tends to overstep boundaries to achieve justice, even if it meant to put his own career at stake. Keith is good friends with Wallace Cheuk, the owner of the chamber's business partnership Wallace Cheuk & Co. Solicitors; James Wei, a colleague and classmate during law school; Danny Mo, a solicitor; and Mavis Hong, whom Keith initially dislikes. Both Keith and Mavis eventually fall for each other, but they are unsure if their feelings for each other are romantic or platonic.

Keith grew up in the slums of Yau Ma Tei, where he lived with his father and mother. His mother was exceptionally harsh on him, often beating and verbally abusing him when he earned bad grades in school. After graduating from college, Keith became a cop in hopes to bring justice upon others. He soon realised that this feat was impossible for a cop and quickly resigned his position in the force, opting to become a lawyer instead. After years of studying, he achieved a license and became Clayton Hau's pupil.

Three years prior the start of the drama, Keith erroneously helped an abusive man, Ho King-wai, win in a case of domestic violence ("Patricide"). Three years later, Keith meets Ho's teenage son Ho Wai-chung, who appears to have killed Ho in order to protect his mother. Realising the truth behind the violence, Keith fights in Chung's defense to make up for his past mistake of helping the boy's father. To appeal to the jury's compassion and empathy towards the boy and his mother, Keith uses a tape he recorded of Ho's testimony years ago as evidence in court to prove Ho's abusive nature, breaching the confidentiality agreement. In episode five, Keith attends a hearing concerning his violation. With the help of Clayton, Keith manages to keep his license from getting revoked.

Keith's poor relationship with his mother never improved since childhood. They live separately, and Keith only sees his mother about once a month. From what appears to be jealousy, Keith's mother is violent and rude toward Keith's girlfriends, and has once offended Mavis. In episode thirteen, his mother is imprisoned for attempting murder, which she denies, but Keith is unsure if she is being truthful.

=== Mavis Hong ===
Mavis Hong Tsz-yan (康芷欣; Hong Zijan), portrayed by Tavia Yeung, is one of the three barristers at Clayton Hau Chamber and the mentor of Cecilia Pun. Coming from a family of successful and respectable lawyers, Mavis has a strong sense of rationality and impartiality. She was ex-wife of Michael, who she met when she was in England and fell in love. Michael's drinking habits gets in the way of their marriage, and Mavis filed for divorce. Nonetheless, the ex-couple remain as friends, and Mavis even defended Michael in a civil case.

Mavis initially dislikes Keith Lau for his careless and wily attitude, but after experiencing through several ambiguous loopholes and downfalls in a criminal case ("A Star's Rape Case"), she begins to see a different side of Keith, who has been encouraging and supporting her. She begins to fall for Keith, but is unsure if her feelings are romantic or platonic.

=== James Wai ===
James Wai Man-hon (韋文翰; Wai Manhon), portrayed by Louis Yuen, is one of the three barristers at Clayton Hau Chamber. He has been good friends with Keith Lau since law school and quickly befriends Wallace Cheuk upon working at Clayton Hau Chamber. Although hardworking and diligent, James has never taken up a court case after he graduated from law school. Due to his upright and honest nature, his parents do not see him as lawyer material and would rather him inheriting his father's calligraphy business instead.

Through a court case he meets Lee Miu-yee, a police sergeant. Polar opposites, they initially dislike each other, but gradually they develop feelings for each other. They are engaged to be married and are expecting their first child together.

=== Norman Shum ===
Norman Shum Lok-yan (沈樂仁; Sam Lokjan), portrayed by Sam Chan, is mentored by Keith Lau and Mavis Hong. In the last episode he is seen wearing the garb and wig of a barrister and therefore implying that he has passed his bar examination.

=== Cecilia Pun ===
Cecilia Pun Hau-yu (潘巧如; Pun Haaujyu), portrayed by Natalie Tong, is the pupil of Mavis Hong and Keith Lau. She is known as "Big C" by her law firm co-workers to distinguish her from another Cecilia who works as a clerical worker at the same firm. Her boyfriend, Alex Kong, calls her "Ceci." First a pupil of Mavis, she transfers under Keith's guidance halfway through the drama. She develops a crush on Keith and at one point confesses her feelings to him, but he kindly rejects her, telling her that he wants to maintain their friendship.

Cecilia eventually starts a relationship with Keith's college friend Alex Kong, a tax accountant. After discovering that he was involved in the murder of a triad leader, Cecilia calls off the relationship. Alex confesses his genuine love for her and promises her that he has changed for the better. He successfully convinces Cecilia to elope to England with him. In episode 23 Alex, believing that Cecilia has betrayed him, runs her over with a mini-van, instantly killing her.

== Wallace Cheuk & Co. Solicitors ==
=== Wallace Cheuk ===
Wallace Cheuk Siu-him (卓少謙; Ceok Siuhim), portrayed by Raymond Wong Ho-yin, is the owner of Wallace Cheuk & Co. Solicitors, a law firm that his father opened for him. He was born into a wealthy family. Although a qualified solicitor, he has no court experience and prefers to handle the business aspects of his job. He develops a fondness for Mavis and pursues her, but she is decidedly unresponsive to his suit. Wallace then tries to impress her by carelessly accepting a tricky court case, which he results in winning with acclaim. Mavis, however, continues to reject his attempts to date her. Dejected, Wallace confides to his ex-girlfriend Cindy, but breaks up with her once again when he realises that they are two people who want different things in life. Wallace is good friends Keith, James, and Danny.

=== Danny Mo ===
Danny Mo King-yip (毛敬業; Mou Gingjip), portrayed by Lai Lok-yi, is the 30-year-old solicitor employed at Wallace Cheuk & Co. Solicitors. He is good friends with Keith, Wallace, and James and is one of the most reliable and intelligent solicitors at the law firm. He is the boyfriend of Keith's younger half-sister, Ivy. They are engaged to be married.

=== Cheung Yiu-on ===
Cheung Yiu-on (張耀安; Zoeng Jiuon), portrayed by Li Shing-cheong, is a paralegal employed at Wallace Cheuk & Co. Solicitors who often assists Keith in court cases.

== Minor characters ==
- Stephen Wong Ka-lok as Chow Chow (周籌; Zau Cau), a solicitor employed at Wallace Cheuk & Co. Solicitors.
- Lau Dan as Hong Ching-yeung (康青揚; Hong Cingjoeng), a judge and Mavis' father.
- Mary Hon as Tsui Siu-mei (徐笑薇; Ceoi Siumei), Mavis' mother.
- Jim Tang as Rex Pun Lok-yu (潘洛宇; Pun Lokjyu), Cecilia's younger brother.
- Chun Wong as Cheuk Kai-hong (卓啟航; Ceok Kaihong), Wallace's father.
- Rebecca Chan as Shiu Man-wai (邵雯慧; Siu Manwai), Wallace's mother.
- Helen Ma as Chow Wai-kuen (周慧娟; Zau Waigyun), Keith's mother.
- Stephen Kwok as Wai King-sang (韋景生; Wai Gingsan), James' father.
- Angelina Lo as Fung Kit-lai (馮潔麗; Fung Gitlai), James' mother. She is one of the seven jurors for the A Star's Rape Case.
- Patrick Dunn as Judge Fan Tak-lun (范德倫), a High Court judge.
- Matthew Ko as Ting Chi-chung (丁志琮), a barrister.
- Brian Burrell as Michael, Mavis' ex-husband.
- Kristal Tin as Lee Miu-yee (李繆兒), a police sergeant and later James Wai's wife.
- Meini Cheung as Cecilia Wong Nga-lok (黃雅樂), a secretary at Clayton Hau Chamber, hired at the same time as Cecilia Poon, nicknamed "細C" to distinguish her from Cecilia Poon.
- Tina Shek as Ceci, a new apprentice to Keith and Mavis, appears in the series finale.

=== "Patricide" characters ===
- Louise Lee as Fong Siu-lan (方笑蘭), who has previously sued her husband for domestic violence, but lost the case.
- Brian Chu as Ho Wai-chung (何偉聰), Lan's teenage son, who murders his father.
- Wong Ching as Ho King-wai (何勁威), who has been psychologically abusing his wife and son for many years.
- Tai Chi-wai as Barrister Man Chak-ming (文澤銘), the prosecuting counsel.
- Patrick Dunn as Judge Fan Tak-lun (范德倫), the High Court judge.
- Dickson Wong as Cheung Chi-kung (張志恭), Chung's friend.

=== "Uncle Files an Appeal" characters ===
- Benz Hui as Tam Wai-tung (譚偉通), the owner of a small food shop who served seven days in jail for hiring illegal workers.
- Chan On-ying as Aunt Tung (通嫂), Tam's wife.
- Wong Fung-king as Chan Kwai-fa (陳桂花), the only employee at Tam's shop.
- Astrid Chan as Judge Wong Shui-hing (王瑞馨), the High Court judge.

=== "A Star's Rape Case" characters ===
- Aimee Chan as Miss X / Iris Leung Yee-ting (梁綺婷), a rising television actress who sues Chima for rape.
- Bitto as Manpreet Chima, an Indian Hong Kong resident and a huge fan of Iris. He claims that he is innocent.
- Gill Mohindepaul Singh as Barrister Gill, Chima's defendant counsel.
- Joseph Lee as Law Sum (羅琛), the head juror and a former Hong Kong Correctional Services personnel.
- Lau Kong as So Wai-kuen (蘇偉權), a juror and a retired accountant.
- Law Ho-kai as Hui Kwok-ching (許國正), a juror and a financier.
- Vin Choi as Leo, a juror and a college graduate.
- Angel Chiang as Bobo, a juror and a CF designer.
- Yvonne Ho as Cheung Yuk-ying (張玉英), a juror and a math teacher.
- Stephen Huynh as Tony, Iris' boyfriend.

=== A Snake's Heart, A Kind Mother characters ===
- Helen Ma as Cheng Suk-kuen (鄭淑娟, Keith's mother
- Rosanne Lui as Tsui Yuen-mei (徐淑媚), Tsui Wing-man's mother & former mistress of Keith's father. Tsui Yuen-mei committed suicide in episode 14.
- Leanne Li as Ivy Tsui Wing-man (徐詠文), Keith's half sister and engaged to Danny Mo
- Lee Chung-hei as Cheong (昌)
- Chung Chi-kwong as Marco Leung, a lawyer
- Chiu Shek-man as Law Kwok Tung (羅國東)
- Tsang Kin-ming as Cheung Man-kwong (張民廣)
- Suen Kwan-hing as Uncle Kam (甘伯)
- Lo Chun-shun as Long Siu-kwan (龍兆坤)
- Yeung Sui-lun as Chu Siu-tung (朱紹東)

=== Kill the Cop characters ===
- Geoffrey Wong as Yeung Sir (楊Sir)
- Felix Lok as Yam Kwok-chu (任國柱)
- Au Sui-wai as Tam Wai-chiu (譚偉釗)
- Daniel Kwok as Turkey (火雞)
- Mat Yeung as Ben Wong Chi-nam (王志樂)
- Lee Yee-man as Cat
- Billy Kong as Chiu Wai-kong (趙偉剛)
- Ip Wai as Wai (威)
- Billy Kong as Kong (剛)
- Law Tin-chi as Chuen (全)
- Ho Chun-hin as Chak (澤)
- Lee Ka-sing as Shing (成)
- Hugo Wong as Yung (勇)
- Wong Chun-tong as Lam Chau (林就)
- Chan Lim-kwan as Tam Wai-chiu's wife

=== Accountant's debt (Episode 20–25) ===
- Kenneth Ma as Alex Kong Lok-man (江洛汶)
- Lee Ka-Ding as Lui Chun-ting (雷震霆)
- Lam King-kong as Lai Kwok-kun (黎國根)
- Steven Ho as Au Yeung Cheong (歐陽昌)
- Dai Yiu-ming as Poon Chung-Sze (潘忠四)
- Alan Luk as Hui Wai-kan (許偉勤)

=== Guest characters ===
Armed burglary case (Episode 1)

- Ho Wai-yip as Officer Cheung Siu-keung (張兆強)
- Irene Wong as Cheung's wife
- Shiu Cheuk-hiu as Kwok Ah-loi (郭亞來)
- Jason Lam as Yu Man-hei (余文喜)
- David Do as Chan Kai-tung (陳啟東)

Showroom toilet case (Episode 1)

- Brian Burrell as Michael
- Sin Chun-wai as OGB's representative

Prenuptial agreement case (Episode 2)

- Mandy Lam as Emily Yu
- Siu Hoi-yan as Yu's assistant
- Rachel Kan as Elaine Chong
- Fan Choi-yee as Chong's pupil
- Ko Chun-man as Peter Leung
- Fok Kin-bong as Yu's lover

Forged document case (Episode 3)

- Candy Cheung as Chow Chi-ching (周芷晴)
- Benjamin Yuen as David
- Jess Sum as Mary Yu

In Love with My Teacher (Episode 4)

- Cilla Kung as Miss X / Cheung Wing-shan (張詠珊)
- Cheung Tat-lun as Chu Wing-fai (朱永輝)
- Janice Ting as Miss Y
- Tang Ying-man as Wong Ching-to (王正滔)
- Wan Yu-hung as Wing-shan's mother
- Leung Kin-ping as Wing-shan's father
- Lam Ying-hung as Lee Yuen-han (李婉嫻)

Medical malpractice (Episode 5)

- Rebecca Chan as Siu Man-wai (邵雯慧)
- Cheng Shu-fung as Ma Wing-choi (馬榮財)
- Wilson Tsui as Ma Wing-fu (馬榮富)
- Kei Biu-law as Professor Lee
- Candice Chiu as Lee So-fun (李素芬)
- Poon Fong-fong as Sham Sau-yung (沈秀榕)

Watch company corruption (Episode 6–8)

- Cheng Shu-fung as Ma Wing-choi (馬榮財)
- Chun Wong as Cheuk Kai-hong (卓啟航)
- Wilson Tsui as Ma Wing-fu (馬榮富)
- Ng Heung-lun as Ho Mei-ping (何美萍)
- Yoyo Chen as Ho Hoi-lun (何凱倫)
- Tong Chun-ming as Fisherman (漁夫)
- Yeung Ying-wai as Yuen Ho-hong (袁浩康)

Bar wounding assault (Episode 9–11)

- Brian Burrell as Michael
- Janet Chow as Paula
- Ho Kwan-shing as Paula's boyfriend

Serial robberies (Episode 11–13)

- Otto Chan as Ho Lik-kei (何力奇)
- Chan Min-leung as Uncle Chan (陳伯)

Chow Man murder (Episode 17–20)

- Evergreen Mak as Siu Fuk (蕭福)
- Claire Yiu as Chow Man (周敏)
- Chan Sze-wai as Siu Wai-wai (蕭惠惠)
- Chan Tsz-lok as Siu Lun-lun (蕭倫倫)
- Bond Chan as Sam
- Michael Choi as Dr. Lee
- Tang Ying-man as Wong Ching-to (王正滔)

Prostitution (Episode 21)

- Yu Tsz-ming as Hung Cham (洪湛)
- Kristal Tin as Lee Miu-yee (李繆兒)
- Matthew Ko as Ting Chi-chung (丁志琮)
- Poon Fong-fong as Sham Shau-yung (沈秀榕)

== See also ==
- The Other Truth
- List of The Other Truth episodes
