= Youth Times =

Chinese youth newspaper

- Native name: 青年时报
- Type: Daily newspaper
- Owner: Zhejiang Provincial Committee of the Communist Youth League of China
- Founded: October 8, 2001
- Ceased publication: December 2020
- Language: Chinese
- Headquarters: Hangzhou
- OCLC number: 866048579
- Website: qnsb.com

Youth Times (Chinese: 青年时报), also known as Qingnian Shibao, was a simplified Chinese urban youth newspaper published in the People's Republic of China. The publication was the official newspaper of the Zhejiang Provincial Committee of the Communist Youth League of China.

Youth Times focused on Hangzhou, covered Zhejiang, and was published across China. The newspaper ceased publication in December 2020.

== History ==
The founding of the Youth Times can be traced back to when the Rural Youth (农村青年) was launched in 1951 in Hangzhou by Chen Jinhai (陈金海).

Rural Youth was renamed as Zhejiang Youth (浙江青年), Zhejiang Youth Post (浙江青年报) and Oriental Youth (东方青年), and was discontinued twice.

In 1991, the newspaper was relaunched as Zhejiang Youth Post, and officially renamed as Youth Times on October 8, 2001.

At the end of December 2020, Youth Times announced the suspension of publication, and its official website, qnsb.com, is no longer accessible.
