= Growing Through Life =

- Official poster
- 摘星之旅
- Genre: Modern Drama
- Written by: Yuen Siu Na
- Starring: Damian Lau; Cecilia Yip; Raymond Lam; Bosco Wong; Zhao Ziqi; Toby Leung; Vionn Song; Dominic Lam; Lui Yau-wai
- Opening theme: 所謂理想 by Raymond Lam
- Ending theme: 我們很好 by Raymond Lam
- Country of origin: Hong Kong
- Original languages: Cantonese; Mandarin
- No. of episodes: 30

Production
- Producer: Tommy Leung
- Running time: 45 minutes (approx.) Shooting: February 2009 - June 2009

Original release
- Network: TVB; Shanghai Television
- Release: August 9 – September 17, 2010

Growing Through Life (Traditional Chinese: 摘星之旅) is a 2010 TVB series co-production with Shanghai Television.

== Synopsis ==
Hoi Sing (Hanson) (Raymond Lam) and his mother Ho Wai Sum (Lui Yau Wai) runs a domestic appliance manufacturing factory (Sing Moon Tin Electrical Appliance) that have been left by his father. Hanson’s uncle Hoi Leung (Albert) (Damian Lau), a money-minded businessman seeks any opportunity to acquire Sing Moon Tin.

Albert's wife Cheng Ming Chu (Liza) (Cecilia Yip) and daughter Hoi Mei Si (Macy) (Toby Leung) intercede the acquisition plans as they value the importance of family since the business belongs to the family and that Hanson would like to maintain Sing Moon Tin. Through persuasion Liza and Macy convinces Albert to put the acquisition on hold.

However, a business opportunity arises, Albert (being the major shareholder) places a spy Fong Lai King (Zhao Ziqi) in the factory to cause mishaps. To persuade Albert in giving up on the business plan, Wai Sum decides to reveal a long-kept secret to him. Hanson invites his friend Chung Lam Tai (Linus) (Bosco Wong) to join the factory so that he no longer has to fight alone for the family business.

Withholding the trust in the friendship it does not cross Hanson's mind that Linus would betray him such that his friend is a wolf in sheep skin. Hanson's fiance Chok Yiu Kwan (Ella) (Vionn Song) cancels the wedding all of a sudden and gets betrayed by Linus. Then, the cold reality eventually forces Hanson into the fiercest commercial wars.

== Cast ==
=== Hoi family ===
Cast	Role	Description
Jack Wu	Hoi Yeung 海洋	Hoi Leung's elder brother Ho Wai Sum's husband Hoi Sing's adopted father (is truly uncle to Hoi Sing); Deceased
Lui Yau-wai (current) (呂有慧)	Ho Wai Sum 何蕙心	Hoi Yeung's wife Hoi Sing's mother Hoi Leung's sister-in-law and ex-girlfriend Hoi Meisi's aunt
Vanko Wong (youngster)	Ho Wai Sum 何蕙心	Hoi Yeung's wife Hoi Sing's mother Hoi Leung's sister-in-law and ex-girlfriend Hoi Meisi's aunt
Damian Lau (current)	Hoi Leung (Albert) 海亮	Chairman of Wing Hoi Group; Hoi Yeung's younger brother Hoi Sing's uncle (truly he is the biological father of Hoi Sing); Macy's father Ho Wan Sum's brother-in-law and ex-boyfriend (Semi-villain)
Ngo Ka-nin (youngster)	Hoi Leung (Albert) 海亮	Chairman of Wing Hoi Group; Hoi Yeung's younger brother Hoi Sing's uncle (truly he is the biological father of Hoi Sing); Macy's father Ho Wan Sum's brother-in-law and ex-boyfriend (Semi-villain)
Cecilia Yip	Cheng Ming Chu (Liza) 鄭明珠	Hoi Leung's wife Macy's mother Hoi Sing's aunt / evil stepmother to Hoi Sing; Does not think before actioning, entrusts Linus (Semi-villain)
Raymond Lam	Hoi Sing (Hanson) 海星	Boss of Sing Moon Tin Electrical Appliance; Hoi Yeung's adopted son (is truly Hoi Yeung's nephew); Ho Wai Sum's son Hoi Leung's nephew (truly his biological father); Cheng Ming Chu's nephew Macy's cousin (truly Macy's elder half brother); Chung Lam Dai's best friend, then gets betrayed Chok Yiu Kwan's ex-boyfriend Fong Lai King's boyfriend
Toby Leung	Hoi Mei Si (Macy) 海美思	Hoi Leung and Cheng Ming Chu's daughter Hoi Sing's cousin (truly Hoi Sing's younger half sister); Hoi Yeung and Ho Wai Sum's niece Chung Lam Dai's wife, finally divorced

=== Chung family ===
Cast	Role	Description
Dominic Lam	Chung Kin Shing 鍾建成	Chung Lam Dai's father Factory supervisor of Sing Moon Tin Electrical Appliance
Bosco Wong	Chung Lam Dai (Linus) 鍾林大	Chung Kin Shing's son Hoi Liang and Cheng Ming Chu's son-in-law Hoi Meisi's husband, finally divorced Hoi Sing's best friend, later betrays him Chok Yiu Kwan's ex-boyfriend, later mistress To gain status, uses manipulative strategies as embarrassed about his own background (Main villain)

=== Fong Family ===
Cast	Role	Description
Mimi Chu (朱咪咪)	Mak Oi Ling 麥愛玲	Fong Lai King and Fong Lai Ha's mother
Zhao Ziqi (趙子琪)	Fong Lai King 方麗京	Mak Oi Ling's daughter Fong Lai Ha's elder sister Wing Hoi Group's admin clerk, later senior admin assistant Acted as a spy in Sing Moon Tin Electrical Appliance; Later Hoi Sing's wife Cantonese dubbed by Mimi Lo
Vivien Yeo	Fong Lai Ha 方麗霞	Mak Oi Ling's daughter Fong Lai King's younger sister

=== Chok Family ===
Cast	Role	Description
KK Cheung (張國強)	Chok Yiu Kwong (Raymond) 祝耀光	Chok Yiu Kwan's elder brother
Song Wenfei	Chok Yiu Kwan (Ella) 祝耀群	Chok Yiu Kwong's younger sister Chung Lam Dai's ex-girlfriend, later lover Hoi Sing's ex-girlfriend Threatened Chung Lam Dai to divorce Hoi Mei Si and re-date with her (Semi-villain)

=== Other Casts ===
Cast	Role	Description
Power Chan	Chow Cheuk Wai (Wilson) 周卓威	Hoi Liang's personal assistant Colluded with Chung Lam Dai later (villain)
Felix Lok	Mr. Yip	Property developer Wing Hoi Group's business partner Discorded with Hoi Leung; Colluded with Chung Lam Dai later (villain)
Wilson Tsui (艾威)	Mr. Chiu	Property developer Wing Hoi Group's business partner Discorded with Hoi Leung (villain)
Brian Burrell	Mr. Solo	International fund manager Colluded with Chung Lam Dai (villain)
Matthew Ko		Fong Lai Ha's ex-boyfriend
Law Lok Lam		Wing Hoi Group's shareholder Marketing Director
Chun Wong		Wing Hoi Group's shareholder
Kayi Cheung	Fanny	Hoi Liang's secretary
Catherine Chau	Kay	
Lam Yi Kei		
Oscar Chan		

== Viewership ratings ==
	Week	Episodes	Average Points	Peaking Points	References
1	August 9–13, 2010	1 — 5	25	29	
2	August 16–20, 2010	6 — 10	25	—	
3	August 24–27, 2010	11 — 14	25	—	
4	August 30 - September 3, 2010	15 — 19	26	—	
5	September 6–10, 2010	20 — 24	25	—	
6	September 13–16, 2010	25 — 28	27	32	
6	September 17, 2010	29 — 30	27	32	

== Awards and nominations ==
TVB Anniversary Awards (2010)

- Nominated: Best Drama
- Nominated: Best Actor (Damian Lau)
- Nominated: Best Actor (Bosco Wong)
