= 2004 Astro Wah Lai Toi Drama Awards =

- Date: 8 January 2005
- Location: Wisma MCA

Television/radio coverage
- Network: Astro Wah Lai Toi
- Produced by: Astro, TVB

The 2004 Astro Wah Lai Toi Drama Awards (simplified Chinese: Astro华丽台电视剧大奖2004; traditional Chinese: Astro華麗臺電視劇大獎2004), presented by Astro in Malaysia, was an awards ceremony that recognises the best Hong Kong television programmes that had aired on Malaysia's Astro Wah Lai Toi in 2004. The ceremony took place on 8 January 2005 at the Wisma MCA in Kuala Lumpur, Malaysia. It was televised live on Astro's Cantonese channel, Astro Wah Lai Toi.

Square Pegs was the night's biggest winner, earning a total of four awards including My Favourite Drama and My Favourite Actor (Roger Kwok).

== Winners and nominees ==
Winners are 100% based on popular vote.

My Favourite Actor in a Leading Role	My Favourite Actress in a Leading Role
Roger Kwok as Ding Sheung-won in Square Pegs; Gallen Lo as Ivan Ding in Golden Faith; Julian Cheung as Yeung Kwong in Take My Word For It; Bobby Au-yeung as Chan Siu-sang in Armed Reaction IV; Francis Ng as Samuel "Sam" Tong in Triumph In the Skies	Flora Chan as Isabelle "Belle" Lok in Triumph In the Skies; Jessica Hsuan as Ling Choi-fung in Square Pegs; Nancy Sit as Yau Nim-chi in Virtues of Harmony; Maggie Cheung Ho-yee as Lui Sei-leung in The King of Yesterday and Tomorrow; Joyce Tang as Chan Sam-yuen in Armed Reaction IV
My Favourite Drama	My Favourite Drama Theme Song
Square Pegs; Golden Faith; Triumph In the Skies; Armed Reaction IV; Take My Word For It	"Forget Pain" (忘记伤害) by Raymond Lam — Survivor's Law; "Fairy Tale of the Years" (岁月的童话) by Gallen Lo — Golden Faith; "Years Like a Song" (岁月如歌) by Eason Chan — Triumph In the Skies; "Virtues of Harmony" (皆大欢喜) by Nancy Sit — Virtues of Harmony; "Loyal Heart" (肝胆相照) by Frances Yip — Find the Light
Most Unforgettable Villain	Most Unforgettable Kiss
Sonija Kwok as Princess Chiu-yan in Perish in the Name of Love	Flora Chan and Francis Ng in Triumph In the Skies
Most Unforgettable Scene	Most Unforgettable Slap
Ting Sheung-wong's tears; Jessica Hsuan and Roger Kwok in Square Pegs	Kenix Kwok and Moses Chan in Take My Word For It
My Top 10 Favourite Characters	
Gallen Lo as Ivan Ding in Golden Faith; Bowie Lam as Fong Nga-tsai in Vigilante Force; Joyce Tang as Chan Sam-yuen in Armed Reaction IV; Bobby Au-yeung as Chan Siu-sang in Armed Reaction IV; Roger Kwok as Ding Sheung-wong in Square Pegs; Jessica Hsuan as Ling Choi-fung in Square Pegs; Flora Chan as Isabelle "Belle" Lok in Triumph In the Skies; Francis Ng as Samuel "Sam" Tong in Triumph In the Skies; Nancy Sit as Yau Nim-chi in Virtues of Harmony; Charmaine Sheh as Princess Cheung-ping in Perish in the Name of Love	
