= List of A Fist Within Four Walls characters =

A Fist Within Four Walls intertitle. From left to right: Fung Chun-mei, Fa Man, Duen Ying-fung, Chor Au-kuen, Tiu Lan, Lung Shing-fu, Yuk Bo-fung, Or Tak-li.

A Fist Within Four Walls is a Hong Kong television drama created by Jazz Boon for TVB. It is a martial arts action serial drama, and revolves around kung fu masters living in the triad-ridden Kowloon Walled City during the early 1960s. The drama stars Ruco Chan as the series' protagonist, a gifted martial arts novice who, along with a group of young kung fu masters, take down the walled city's largest criminal organisation, the Fellow Association. The drama also stars Nancy Wu, Benjamin Yuen, Philip Ng, Yuen Qiu, Grace Wong, and Moon Lau in lead roles.

== Protagonists ==
=== Chor Au-Kuen ===
Chor Au-Kuen (Chinese: 左勾拳; Jyutping: Zo2 Ngau1 Kyun4, meaning "left-hooked fist"), portrayed by Ruco Chan, is the main protagonist. He is often referred to as Kuen Lo (拳佬; "Fist Guy"; alt. "Boxer") by his friends, and is an extremely gifted martial arts novice. Kuen is described as an "optimistic and hot-blooded" natural-born leader, but is flawed with his impulsive and competitive nature. Kuen is kind-hearted, sometimes to the point of naivety. Yeung Hoi-pok portrayed 10-year-old Kuen.

Kuen was born Chiu Yeung (朝陽; Ziu1 Joeng4), and was the son of Chiu Mang-san, a Bajiquan master of the Chiu style. He and his younger sister Chiu Ha were both diligent Bajiquan students of their father. In 1945, when Yeung was 10, his family moved into the Kowloon Walled City to start a new living. They get acquainted with Duen Tung-tin, a Bajiquan master of the Duen style. Master Duen had long been a protector of the walled city; his Bajiquan kwoon was established to defend the walled city against oncoming triads, who were trying to take the ungoverned walled city as their base. Wanting to protect the walled city with them, Yeung asked his father to teach him his signature move, "Scaling Tiger" (猛虎硬爬山), but his father said the move was too powerful for someone as young as Yeung to learn.

Yeung was forcibly separated from his family when Master Duen died under mysterious circumstances. Duen's students claimed that Yeung's father was the murderer, as they were seen fighting right before Duen's death. The doctor ruled the cause of the death to be blunt trauma, and only Chiu's "Fierce Tiger Climbing Mountain" strike had enough power to kill. Yeung's parents were then beaten to death by Duen's students, and Yeung was separated from his younger sister. Yeung then escaped to Macau to live with his great-aunt.

In 1959, 26-year-old Yeung, now named Chor Au-kuen, returns to the Kowloon Walled City to search for his sister. He meets But Tak-liu, a general contractor, who brings him into the walled city and introduces him to a water labouring job so he can pay his rent to the landlady Tiu Lan. By chance, he meets Duen Ying-fung, Master Duen's now adult son, and learns that the Duen family no longer operate a Bajiquan kwoon due to increasing intimidation of the Fellow Association, the walled city's largest triad organisation. Master Duen's death had indirectly led to the rise of the Fellow Association's power in the walled city. Kuen feels regretful and responsible—if his father had not killed Duen, the walled city may not have fallen victim into the wrong hands. He also learns from Fung that his sister had died from a mountain fire 15 years ago while attempting to escape the walled city. Kuen develops survivor's guilt as a result.

Wanting to atone his sins, Kuen decides to stay in the walled city and takes on the duty of protecting its people. Believing that his father's "Fierce Tiger Climbing Mountain" to be the strike that had killed Master Duen, Kuen refuses to re-learn Bajiquan, and seeks help from his neighbour Thai Por, a retired master in Wing Chun and Muay Thai. Kuen is a quick learner, and immediately adapts to Thai Por's fighting style, and uses her moves to defeat his enemies. After defeating underground Muay Thai champion Lung Shing-fu, who is also Thai Por's son, Kuen and Fung form the Kowloon Walled City Welfare Association to break the Fellow Association's stronghold in the walled city.

While attempting to rescue his Fa Man, he suffers head trauma causing blindness. Together with Fa Man's death and his loss at the hands of Fung he leaves his friends and becomes homeless. Tiu Lan soon convinces him to return and trains to fight without his eyesight. He later helps fight Yeung.

=== Tiu Lan ===
Tiu Lan (Chinese: 刁蘭; Jyutping: Diu1 Laan4), portrayed by Nancy Wu, is Kuen's landlady and the owner of a local hair salon within the walled city. She is feisty, bossy, and can be at times too overbearing, but is innately honourable, protective, and compassionate. Her name, Tiu Lan, is a homophone of the word 刁難 (Diu1 Laan1), meaning "to give someone a difficult time."

Tiu Lan is introduced at the start of the drama as a stingy hair stylist who Kuen meets on his first day back to the walled city. She accepts Kuen as her tenant, but only under the conditions that he takes the night shift job at her salon without pay. Though they often bicker, Kuen and Tiu Lan bond over a shared secret, which is having a past that they wish to keep hidden. Tiu Lan has an obvious crush on Fung, which Kuen uses to his advantage.

When Yam-yam dies in Tiu Lan's arms, Tiu Lan gets triggered and kills all of Yam-yam's captors. She suffers a heart attack, but is saved by Kuen and Fung. It is revealed in later episodes that Tiu Lan was trained to be an assassin as a child, under the code name Sun Mei (辛未; San Mei). Suffering from a difficult heart condition and no longer willing to kill for The Order, she escaped her captors to live a life of freedom. When her former partner Kap San reappears in her life, he reminds her that she was one of the child assassins who had lent a helping hand in killing Kuen's father.

=== Duen Ying-fung ===
Duen Ying-fung (Chinese: 段迎風; Jyutping: Dyun6 Jing4 Fung1, meaning "welcome the wind") portrayed by Benjamin Yuen, is Kuen's friend and occasional rival. He is also a dentist, and is often referred to as Ngah Lo (牙佬; "Tooth Guy"; alt. "Tooth Man"). Fung is calm, perceptive, and level-headed, a stark contrast to Kuen's impulsiveness. Fung is the same age as Kuen, having met when they were kids, though Fung does not learn of this encounter until later on. Alvin Lau portrayed 10-year-old Fung.

Fung was the son of Duen Tung-tin, a highly skilled Bajiquan master who used to be a protector of the walled city. After his father's death, the family kwoon falls apart and the walled city descends into anarchy, with triads being its virtual ruler. Fung is advised by his uncle to only practice his Bajiquan in secret so he won't fall into the same fate as his father. Along with his uncle, Fung becomes a dentist and opens up a dental clinic in the walled city. Fung's good looks and kind temperament has made him quite popular with the ladies, winning the affections of even Tiu Lan and her tenants.

After witnessing Kuen's bravery while trying to save Yam-yam from the Fellow Association leader Fung Ha-moon, Fung decides that he can no longer stay silent. Along with Kuen, he forms the Kowloon Walled City Welfare Association to protect the walled city's people against the intimidation of the Fellow Association. His uncle, upset with this decision, alienates him. No longer welcomed back at the clinic, he moves in with Kuen and Tiu Lan. He gets warped into investigating a drug operation when Bajiquan fighter Fa Man, who appears to be allied with Fellow Association leader Fung Chun-mei, asks for his help to destroy the supply. He later proposes to Fa Man, but is deeply shocked as his whole family is killed before his wedding. He later helps kill Yeung in revenge for his family and Man's death, and starts to teach Bajiquan to the residents.

=== Lung Shing-fu ===
Lung Shing-fu (Chinese: 龍成虎; Jyutping: Lung4 Sing4 Fu2, meaning "dragon makes tiger"), portrayed by Philip Ng, is Kuen and Fung's rival. He is a trained fighter in Muay Thai, and is one of the walled city's most highly skilled martial artists. His mother and Audrey call him by his nickname, "Kitty" (貓仔; Maau1 Zai2). Fu is composed, stoic, and extremely protective of those he cares about.

Fu was born in Thailand, and is the only son of Yuk Bo-fung and a Thai Chinese merchant. After his father's death, his mother brought him to the Kowloon Walled City to start a new life. Wanting to provide his mother with a better life, he becomes an underground Muay Thai boxer to earn prize money, and also impresses triad boss Or Man-cheung, later becoming his right-hand man(as revealed in episode 14, Fu killed Or Man-Cheung's previous right-hand man). His mother dislikes Fu's decision of joining the triads and they have a falling-out. Fu occasionally visits his mother at her store, though it always ends up with a scolding.

When Or Man-cheung's daughter, Audrey, returns to Hong Kong from graduating university, Fu is assigned to be her bodyguard. Audrey's kind and warm-hearted personality is unlike that of her father. When Audrey is kidnapped by Fuk Sau-kam, another member of the Fellow Association who believes that Or Man-cheung stole his drugs, Fu nearly sacrifices his life to save her.

After Or Man-Cheung's retirement from the Fellow Association, Fu becomes his new restaurant's manager and repairs his relationship with his mother when he begins teaching Muay Thai for a living. Despite Lung shing-fu having the boldness of a man, he completely lacks relationship skills as shown when Or Tak-Li was unimpressed with his attempted proposal at a street foodstand. He asks his mother for advice, then attempts a second proposal in the traditional Thai style with a bucket of water, but it didn't go according to plan. Later on when he encounters Yeung chuk-luen trying to kill Or Tak-li, Fu fought vehemently to defend her from Yeung, he discovered Yeung was the assassin that Chor Au-Kuen was looking for and the one responsible for the mysterious death of Duen's father. In addition, he discovered his iron shirt skill, as his well-executed strikes was doing no damage to him. Fu was later injured, stabbed in the stomach by a steel rod and dies in Audrey's arms.

=== Yuk Bo-fung ===
Yuk Bo-fung (Chinese: 玉波鳳; Jyutping: Juk6 Bo1 Fung2), portrayed by Yuen Qiu, is the mother of Lung Shing-fu. She is known as Thai Por (泰婆; "Thai Lady"; alt. "Thai Hag") by her neighbours, and owns a general store across the street from Tiu Lan's hair salon. The two do not get along, but they share similar concerns about the Fellow Association's growing power within the walled city. A Master in Wing Chun and Muay Thai, Thai Por becomes Kuen's pseudo-mentor, and teaches him various methods to defend himself against the fighters of the Fellow Association.

Thai Por is originally from Mainland China, but she moved to Thailand after marrying a Thai Chinese merchant. After the death of her husband, she and her son, Fu, move to Hong Kong to start a new living. Thai Por is against Fu's decision of joining the Fellow Association, and they have a falling-out until Fu becomes Cheung's new restaurant's manager.

After Fu's death, she closes down her store and opens a restaurant and teaches her new daughter-in-law fighting skills.

=== Fa Man ===
Fa Man (Chinese: 花曼; Jyutping: Fa1 Maan4), portrayed by Grace Wong, is the owner of a wealthy brothel establishment in the walled city, and appears to be allied with Fung Chun-mei at first. She often uses her beauty and charm to achieve her goals, and weakens her enemies with poisonous traps. Her real identity, however, is a Bajiquan master, disguising herself as a striptease performer so she can infiltrate the Fellow Association. In Episode 13, it is revealed that Fa Man is actually Chiu Ha (朝霞; Ziu1 Haa4), Kuen's younger sister whom he believes to be dead after she ran away .

Man was separated from her older brother after her parents were framed and beaten to death in 1945. While Kuen escaped to Macau with their great-aunt, Man stayed to bury her parents. Man was believed to have died after she cremated her parents, as the cremation caused a wildfire all over the mountainside. Believing her father's innocence, Man assumes a new identity and infiltrates the Fellow Association to search for the true killer. She discovers that the Fellow Association's three leaders—Fung Chun-mei, Or Man-cheung, and Fuk Sau-kam—were the three men who attacked her father in prison. Fuk Sau-kam becomes her first victim when he plans to escape the walled city. Fung Chun-mei is her second victim, Fa Man kills him after betraying and ruining him. She was unable to fulfill her last task at killing Or Man-cheung, as he was aware that there was someone targeting him.

When all seemed at peace at the Walled City Fa Man and Duen Ying-fung gets married, but happiness is not long lived when Fung's entire household is murdered on their wedding day. Fa Man finds out that Yeung Chuk-luen is the mastermind behind all the evil in the Walled City after picking up dope at his pastry shop. She was later ambushed by Kap San and his henchmen who severely injure her. With her brother's failed attempt to protect Fa Man from the assassins, she was stabbed in the stomach by one of the assassins and died.

=== Or Tak-li ===
Or Tak-li (Chinese: 柯德莉; Jyutping: O1 Dak1 Lei4), portrayed by Moon Lau, is the daughter of Or Man-cheung. Also known by her English name Audrey, she is introduced at the start of the show as a university graduate who recently returned to Hong Kong from overseas. Fascinated with the culture of the walled city, she volunteers for a teaching post at a local public school in the city and becomes acquainted with Kuen, who she takes a liking to. After discovering her father's involvement with the Fellow Association, she threatens to leave him, forcing him to retire. Audrey develops a close relationship with her body guard, Lung Shing-fu. It is later revealed that Audrey's actual biological father is Yeung Chuk-luen who had an affair with Or Man-cheung's late wife.

== Main antagonists ==
=== Fung Chun-mei ===
Fung Chun-mei (Chinese: 馮春美; Jyutping: Fung4 Ceon1 Mei5), portrayed by Carlo Ng, is one of the three triad leaders of the Fellow Association. He and his younger brother, Fung Ha-moon, control most of the city's brothels and performance clubs. Mei is a master in the Eagle Claw, and is one of the most highly skilled martial artists in the walled city. His feminine appearance and demeanor hides his true persona of a ruthless, cruel and sadistic triad boss. When his brother was beaten to death by Fu, Mei made it his life mission to destroy Fu and everyone associated with him. Mei becomes the Fellow Association's temporary chairman after Or Man-cheung retires and was one of the three assassins who attacked Kuen's father in prison fifteen years ago. After devising a gambling plan causing almost all the walled city citizens to be in-debt to him as a tactic to destroy Kuen and Fung, it backfires when Fa Man betrays and then killed him.

=== Fuk Sau-kam ===
Fuk Sau-kam (Chinese: 福壽金; Jyutping: Fuk1 Sau6 Gam1; alt. "Opium Kam"), portrayed by Vincent Lam, is one of the three triad leaders of the Fellow Association. He controls most of the city's drug rings, and is also a drug addict himself. He is a master in the Piguaquan, and takes medication to neutralise his sensitivity to pain. Kam has a sadistic mind, and takes joy in torturing others for his entertainment. He is one of the three assassins who attacked Kuen's father in prison fifteen years ago. When Fung Chun-mei frames Or Man-cheung for Kam's stolen drug shipment, Kam kidnaps Audrey for exchange of the drugs. After Audrey escapes from Kam, Cheung puts up a bounty for his life. Kam soon becomes the most targeted person in the walled city with everyone after his life. While trying to escape the walled city he is killed by Fa Man.

=== Or Man-cheung ===
Or Man-cheung (Chinese: 柯萬長; Jyutping: O1 Maan6 Coeng4), portrayed by KK Cheung, is one of the three triad leaders of the Fellow Association. He is the father of Audrey Or, who is also his only daughter. Cheung controls most of the gambling operations within the walled city, including the city's biggest underground fighting ring. After Fuk Sau-kam's old drug-maker tries to assassinate him, he nearly dies and has a change of heart, retiring from the Fellow Association and transforming his casinos into restaurants. Cheung is a master in Tai Chi and was one of the three assassins who attacked Kuen's father in prison fifteen years ago. His supposed reform was a lie to appease his daughter and lure out who killed the other two Fellow Association leaders. In order to take back control of the Walled City he plans a fake truce gathering to blow up Kuen, Fung and everyone associated with the Walled City Welfare Association and in the end kills Siu Chi. Cheung becomes outnumbered when he is no match to fight Kuen, Man and Fu, who turns against him after seeing his true colors. While trying to escaped the walled city he encounters Luen, who beats Cheung to death and then reveals to a dying Cheung his real identity and that Audrey is not his biological daughter but Luen's biological daughter because he had an affair with Cheung's late wife, shocking Cheung as he died.

=== Fung Ha-moon ===
Fung Ha-moon (Chinese: 馮夏滿; Jyutping: Fung4 Haa6 Mun5), portrayed by Oscar Li, is Fung Chun-mei's younger brother, and co-rules his prostitution empire. He is a notorious pervert that rapes all the new girls sold into prostitution and of age walled city virgin female citizens he fancies. His obsession to deflower Lee Wai-yam causes Kuen to start an uprising against Moon and his brother Mei, with the help of Yuk Bo-fung and Duen. He is large and bulky which makes him a skilled wrestler, a stark contrast to his brother's stylistic Eagle Claw. He is later beaten to death by Lung Shing-fu when he tries to rape Audrey.

=== Yeung Chuk-luen ===
Yeung Chuk-luen (Chinese: 楊竹鑾; Jyutping: Joeng4 Zuk1 Lyun4), portrayed by Jimmy Au, is the owner of a put chai ko(缽仔糕) factory whom started out as an ally of Kuen and Fung. However, later episodes revealed him as the main villain. Many years ago, he was asked by the leader of the Fellowship Association to assist Or Man-Cheung, Fuk Sau-Kam and Fung Chun-Ming by killing Duen Ying-Fung’s father and framing Kuen’s father. Disgusted by the Fellowship Association’s im competence, he disguises himself as a humble citizen within the city to plan his takeover. He helps the walled city citizens whenever possible, however to protect his employees he is blackmailed by Fuk Sau-kam into smuggling drugs outside of the walled city. Finding out how despicable Fuk Sau-kam is, he cut ties with him and joins the Walled City Welfare Association to side with Kuen. He has trained his body to be as tough as an iron shield that not only gained him the near immortal ability, but also protects him from being injured by any strikes. However, this capability also leaves him vulnerable to anything caused by gravity (falling) and external elements (fire). Eventually Kuen found his weak-spot and allows him and Duen to kill him with the Scaling Tiger strike. It is believed that Otto Chan portrayed a younger Yeung Chuk-Luen.

== Supporting characters ==
=== But Tak-liu ===
But Tak-liu (Chinese: 畢得了; Jyutping: Bat1 Dak1 Liu5), portrayed by Lam Tsz-sin, is Kuen's roommate and one of Tiu Lan's tenant. He works as a general contractor and was the first person to bring Kuen into the walled city. He is married to Lau Tai, and they have one son, Siu-san.

=== Duen Chit-keung ===
Duen Chit-keung (Chinese: 段折韁; Jyutping: Dyun6 Zit3 Goeng1), portrayed by Stephen Ho, is Fung's uncle and the younger brother of Duen Tung-tin. He is a Bajiquan master and the original owner of the Duen family's Bajiquan kwoon. Keung falls in love with Fa Man who uses this as an advantage to extract the truth of what happened in 1945. Keung's cowardice in 1945 leads him to frame Kuen and Man's father for the death of his brother, when in fact he knows who the actual killer of his brother is. Jonathan Wong portrayed a younger Duen Chit-keung. He is later killed by Yeung Chuk-luen's 'fierce tiger climbing mountain'.

=== Wong Siu-chi ===
Wong Siu-chi (Chinese: 王小智; Jyutping: Wong4 Siu2 Zi3), portrayed by Jonathan Lee, is a mentally challenged young man that produces candy at the Duen's dental clinic. He is Kuen first Bajiquan mentor and later sacrificed himself to protect his uncle from Cheung's bomb attack.

=== Lau Tai ===
Lau Tai (Chinese: 劉娣; Jyutping: Lau4 Tai5), portrayed by Zoie Tam, is But Tak-liu's wife who also works for Tiu Lan at her hair salon.

=== Lee Wai-yam ===
Lee Wai-yam (Chinese: 李懷鑫; Jyutping: Lei5 Waai4 Jam1), portrayed by Bella Lam, is an employee at Tiu Lan's hair salon. Her gambling-addicted father sells her into prostitution to the Fung brothers to pay off his debts. With the help of Tiu Lan, Kuen, and Fung, Yam-yam escapes the walled city and finds a job at a newspaper agency in the main city with her father. Yam-yam dreams to be a news columnist, but her dream never gets realised as her father sells her again to a gambling parlor triad boss after he fails to pay his debts. She is later raped by the gambling parlor leader and whipped by his gang, dying in Tiu Lan's arms when the trio tries to save her.

== Other characters ==
- Lee Fat (Chinese: 李發; Jyutping: Lei5 Faat3), portrayed by Ngai Wai-man, is Yam-yam's father. He is a greedy gambling addict who is willing to do anything for money. He treats his daughter Yam-yam as an owned property that can be sold thinking that he can have more children in the future. He returns to the Walled City after his daughter's death begging for forgiveness and claims to be a reformed person, which is a lie. Due to his inability to repay his gambling debts he is beaten to a cripple.
- Man Zeun (Chinese: 敏駿; Jyutping: Man Joon), portrayed by Princeton Lock, is a herbal doctor and owner of a Traditional Chinese Medicine store within the walled city.
- Kap San (Chinese: 甲辰; Jyutping: Gaap San), portrayed by Jonathan Cheung, is an assassin from Tiu Lan's past. The two trained together at a young age to kill and later became lovers during their youth while also masking their identities by pretending to be a loving couple managing a street-side noodle stall. His true motive for arriving at the Walled City is to aid Luen for control of the Walled City in exchange for Lan and his freedom from the Assassination Society. In order to divide Kuen and Fung he later kills Fung's uncle and entire household the night before Fung's wedding. After Fa Man finds out Luen has been behind all the evil doings in the Walled City, San is sent to kill her. Eventually a final showdown with Lan and Kuen led to his death while revealing the true motive of Luen.
- Yip Fai (Chinese: 葉輝; Jyutping: Jip Fai), portrayed by Penny Chan, is Kuen and But Tak-iu's illiterate co-worker. He is nicknamed "Heat Rash". He runs a walled city tour where he brings outsiders to the walled city to experience the confined city.
- Chor Ching-miu (Chinese: 左貞妙; Jyutping: Zo Zingmiu), portrayed by Lily Leung, Kuen's great-aunt who escaped the walled city with him and raised him in Macau. She later returns to the Walled City pretending to be a tourist, to find Kuen. She stays with her great-nephew Kuen until he sends her out of the Walled City.
- Sister Maria, portrayed by Apple Ha, is the Roman Catholic nun of a local primary school in the walled city.
- Carat Cheung, Chloe Nguyen, Apple Chan, and Doris Chow, respectively portray Wu Nei (胡妮; Wu Nei), Lai Chau (黎鞦; Lai Cau), Go Yeung (羔羊; Go Yeung), and Wong Fa Cheuk (黃花雀; Wong Fa Cheuk), four striptease performers who are Tiu Lan close friends and tenants. However all four are not very good at their profession. Wu Nei later dies from a lethal stab for Go Yeung.
- Roxanne Tong and Kanice Lau respectively portray Connie and Julia, Audrey's close friends.

== Past characters ==
- Chiu Mang-san (Chinese: 朝猛山; Jyutping: Ziu Maang Saan), portrayed by Ruco Chan, is Kuen's deceased father.
- Duen Tung-tin (Chinese: 段通天; Jyutping: Dyun Tung Tin), portrayed by Benjamin Yuen, is Fung's deceased father.
- Choi Shuk-kuen (蔡淑娟; Coi Sukgyun), portrayed by Natalie Tong, is Chiu Mang-san's wife who was beaten to death along with him.
- Ng Yi-lai (吳綺麗; Ng Jilai), portrayed by Kimmy Kwan, is Duen Tung-tin's wife.
