= Triumph in the Skies II =

2013 television drama

- Promotional poster
- Written by: Sharon Au; Lo Mei-wan
- Starring: Francis Ng; Julian Cheung; Myolie Wu; Fala Chen; Ron Ng; Kenneth Ma; Nancy Wu; Elena Kong; Him Law
- Theme music composer: George Lam
- Opening theme: Triumph in the Skies (衝上雲霄) by George Lam
- Ending theme: Aerial Lovers (空中戀人) by Mag Lam On My Way by Raymond Lam
- Country of origin: Hong Kong
- Original language: Cantonese
- No. of episodes: 43

Production
- Executive producer: Tommy Leung
- Producers: Sharon Au; Joe Chan
- Production locations: Hong Kong; Sanya, Hainan; Qingdao, China; Paris, France; Bath, Somerset; Kenting National Park; Kaohsiung, Taiwan
- Production company: TVB

Original release
- Network: Jade; HD Jade
- Release: 15 July – 8 September 2013

Related
- Triumph in the Skies (2003); Triumph in the Skies (film) (2015)

Triumph in the Skies II
- Traditional Chinese: 衝上雲霄II
- Simplified Chinese: 冲上云霄II
- Literal meaning: "soar into the skies"
Transcriptions
Standard Mandarin
- Hanyu Pinyin: Chong Shàng Yúnxiao
Yue: Cantonese
- Yale Romanization: Chung1 Seung5 Wan4-siu1
- Jyutping: Cung Soeng5 wan4-siu1

Triumph in the Skies II (Chinese: 衝上雲霄II) is a 2013 television drama produced by TVB under executive producer Tommy Leung. It is a direct sequel to TVB's 2003 blockbuster television drama Triumph in the Skies. It stars Francis Ng, Julian Cheung, Myolie Wu, Fala Chen, Ron Ng, Kenneth Ma, Nancy Wu, Elena Kong and Him Law.

A film adaptation Triumph in the Skies started production on August 6, 2014 and was released in 2015.

== Plot ==
Samuel Tong (Francis Ng) resides in the UK to spend a long vacation following his wife's death. After encountering Holiday Ho (Fala Chen), a wanderer whose boyfriend died in an aviation accident, he ends his vacation early after finally making the cake thanks to the unintentional help from Holiday Ho that he once made for his deceased wife, Zoe (Myolie Wu), he returns to Hong Kong, and joins Skylette Airlines as a pilot to fly again. He meets Captain Jayden "Captain Cool" Koo (Julian Cheung), and the two exhibit two distinct personalities, with Sam being reserved and Jayden being a man who likes to attract attention.

Respectively, the two get emotionally entangled with Holiday, who arrives in Hong Kong to apply for pilot training (PPP—Pre-pilot Project). Moreover, Sam becomes a training captain and airline examiner to assess Jayden, leading to a competition between the two for both career and love.

Jayden's younger sister Summer Koo (Myolie Wu) is an aircraft maintenance supervisor technician, and she bears grudges against her brother due to an unhappy experience during her childhood. Samuel's younger brother Issac (Ron Ng), due to Summer physically resembling his sister-in-law Zoe, is unable to turn a blind eye on it and tries helps settle the dispute between Summer and her brother. Summer has a crush on Issac, yet Issac restrains himself from taking another step forward in order to avoid evoking Sam's grief.

In the end, the misunderstanding causes Summer to think that she was only treated like Zoe (Sam's deceased wife) in Issac's eyes. Senior First Officer Roy Ko (Kenneth Ma) has two girlfriends and cannot make up his mind as he does not bear to hurt anyone. After sharing his secret with Heather Fong (Elena Kong), a senior purser, Roy and she become close associates, and the two even have a one-night stand.

Jim Jim (Him Law), who used to represent Hong Kong in swimming, plans to retire and enroll in flight training after noticing the pilot training (PPP—Pre-pilot Project) after returning from a FINA Aquatic World Championship, where he falls in love with CoCo Ling (Nancy Wu), who is to be a surrogate mother for her friend.

With the planes taking-off and landing, stories of sorrow, parting, joyfulness and re-encounters have been constituted.

== Production ==
=== Development ===
In May 2011 Tommy Leung, deputy chief director of TVB's drama department, announced their plans to develop a sequel to Triumph in the Skies with intentions to begin filming in September of that year. Leung added that a theatrical film sequel would be made in the beginning of 2012, in hopes of boosting TVB artistes to become film stars.

In June 2011, it was reported at a TVB press conference that Michael Miu, Raymond Lam, Fala Chen, and Kate Tsui were in negotiations to join, with original cast members Ron Ng, Myolie Wu, Bosco Wong, Kenneth Ma, and Nancy Wu slated to return. Jessica Hsuan, at the time, submitted her name to be part of this series to work with Francis Ng and Chilam Cheung; but it did not work out as her contract with TVB had ended.

In July 2011, Ron Ng, Myolie Wu, Kenneth Ma, Nancy Wu, Fala Chen, and Kate Tsui were confirmed to film the sequel. Following the announcement, TVB pushed back the filming schedule from September 2011 to December 2011 due to negotiation problems with Triumph II's previous airline sponsor Cathay Pacific, which caused some of the newly signed cast members to withdraw, including Michael Miu.

To accommodate the schedules of Ron Ng and Kenneth Ma, whom were booked to film television drama Silver Spoon, Sterling Shackles from November 2011 to March 2012, TVB postponed Triumph II's filming to May 2012. In September 2011, it was reported that Hong Kong Airlines replaced Cathay Pacific as the drama's main sponsorship.

In December 2011, TVB aired a sales promotional trailer for Triumph II to attract more sponsors, which included a surprise appearance by original cast member Francis Ng at the end of the trailer. Julian Cheung, who replaced Michael Miu's role in the trailer, was reportedly hired by TVB for 80,000 HKD per episode, and later confirmed his involvement in April 2012. Raymond Lam and Bosco Wong also appeared in the footage, but both backed out due to conflicting schedules. Rebecca Zhu was later confirmed to join the cast.

On 21 December 2011, it was reported that Francis Ng was in negotiations to return. To accommodate Ng's schedule, filming was postponed again to September 2012, and then moved forward to July 2012.

In May 2012, Kate Tsui revealed in an interview done in Australia that she had been pulled out of the cast to film a mainland Chinese drama instead. Following her announcement, Elena Kong and Kelly Fu were cast. On 23 May 2012, Next Magazine reported that Sammul Chan was in negotiations to return for a HK$25,000 per episode deal. Chan expressed an interest, but ultimately had to reject the offer due to a schedule clash.

A press conference was held on 18 July 2012.

Season 2 premiered on July 15, 2013.

== Cast ==
Actor / Actress	Role	Details
Pal Sinn	Adrian King (景家駿; King Ka-chun)	General Manager at Skylette Airlines, Pink's father, ex-boyfriend of Heather and pursuer again later; Roy's love rival.
Sherry Chen	Rosa (羅莎; Law Sa)	PR manager of Skylette Airlines.
Francis Ng	Samuel "Sam" Tong (唐亦琛; Tong Yik-sum)	Solar Airways and Hong Kong's first Chinese captain pilot. He joins Skylette Airlines after a long leave of absence due to the passing of his wife, Zoe and becomes senior training captain and appointed airline examiner. Later became Jayden's career and love rival. Holiday's boyfriend.
Patrick Dunn	Tony Ching (程日東; Ching Yat-tung)	Skylette's captain pilot and senior training captain pilot, and Heather's ex-husband (After Episode 16), and Pink's godfather. Later resigned in Skylette to become Civil Aviation Department Flight Operation Inspector and became Rachel's boyfriend.
Brian Burrell	Captain Matthew Mac (麥馬修)	Skylette's foreign captain pilot and senior training captain.
Julian Cheung	Jayden "Captain Cool" Koo (顧夏陽; Koo Ha-yeung)	Skylette's handsome captain pilot, flirty ex-Australian air force pilot who is the older brother of Summer Koo. The pair of siblings were separated due to a past incident and he has tried to make it up to her ever since. Holiday's boyfriend, then broke up. In the finale he comments on his return to his true passion as air force pilot in Australia.
Kenneth Ma	Roy Ko (高志宏; Ko Chi-wang)	Senior First officer, best friend of Sam, Issac, CoCo and Nick. Adrian's rival. Became a captain pilot at episode 33. Loves and married Heather at episode 43.
Ron Ng	Issac Tong (唐亦風; Tong Yik-fung)	Sam's younger brother and a Senior First officer. Best friend of Roy, CoCo and Nick. Became a captain pilot and Summer's boyfriend in episode 41.
Hugo Wong	Nick Chung (鍾世沛; Chung Sai-pui)	Senior First officer and Coco's ex-boyfriend/fiancé. Best friend of Roy, CoCo and Issac.
William Chak	Tucker Luk (陸華特; Luk Wah-dak)	First officer and Apple's boyfriend.
Jayden Kau	Alex Yiu (姚偉力; Yiu Wai-nic)	Skylette's First officer.
Fala Chen	Holiday Ho (何年希; Ho Nin-hei)	Manna's daughter and a free-spirited meteorologist who eventually took up aviation. Joined PPP program and finally become a second officer. Jayden's and Sam's love interest. Dated Jayden, then broke up and later on becomes Sam's girlfriend.
Him Law	Jim Jim (詹子麟; Tsim Tsz-lun)	Former olympic swimmer who joined PPP program and became second officer. Coco's love interest and marries her in the finale. He has an older brother who is also his coach, starred by Vincent Lam.
Steve Fox	Captain Bass	A Skylette Captain involved in a sexual dispute with his fellow female colleagues in Skylette.
Elena Kong	Heather Fong (方芮嘉; Fong Choi-ga)	A stewardess (Senior Purser), Tony's ex-wife (after Episode 16), Pink's godmother; Adrian and Roy's love interest. Married Roy at episode 43.
Nancy Wu	Coco Ling (凌卓芝; Ling Cheuk-chi)	A senior stewardess. best friend of Sam, Issac, Roy, and ex-girlfriend of Nick. Carried out artificial insemination and became a surrogate mother for her best friend, Colby. She then falls in love with Jim Jim and marries him in the finale.
Jess Sum	Rachel (韋素心)	A senior stewardess who has a crush on Tony, and later on becomes his girlfriend. Heather's good friend.
Rebecca Zhu	Pink Wu (胡娉; Wu Ping)	An ex-ballet dancer who joins Skylette as an stewardess. Adrian's daughter, Heather's goddaughter. Hero's girlfriend.
Quinn Ho	"Yong Siu Hong Hero"	Pink's boyfriend, joined PPP program became second officer, best friends with Jim Jim
Skye Chan	Joanne	Stewardess at Skylette and Roy's ex-girlfriend.
Coffee Lam	Philis	Stewardess at Skylette and Roy's ex-girlfriend.
Eliza Sam	Tracy Mok (莫文翠; Mok Man-chui)	An air stewardess at Skylette. Housemates with Summer.
Kyle Tse	Kenneth (華堅; Wah Kin)	A Skylette steward.
Snow Suen	Donna (單冬娜; Sinn Tung Na)	An air stewardess at Skylette. Housemates with Summer.
Candice Chiu	Colby (高貝琪; Ko Pui Kei)	A senior customer service officer, Coco's best friend and Victor's fiancée.
Stefan Wong	Fergus (霍格志; Fok Kag Chi)	A Skylette steward and Apple's long-lost brother.
Myolie Wu	Zoe So (蘇怡; So-yi)	A former customer service officer, and Sam's wife, who is revealed to have died before the sequel, but appears as a flashback in episode 8 at the airport flying to London, where she gives her ticket and Triangel to Holiday. In episode 14, she once again reappears in a flashback.
Myolie Wu	Summer Koo, Big Brother (顧夏晨; Koo Ha-sun)	An aircraft maintenance supervisor who physically resembles Zoe. However, Zoe and her have very different personalities as she is displayed as cold to most people except for those who are close to her. Issac's love interest and Teddy's crush. Becomes aircraft engineer and Issac's girlfriend in episode 42.
Adrian Chau	Teddy On, Ah B (安以泰; On Yi-tai))	An aircraft maintenance technician who has a crush on Summer. Become aircraft maintenance supervisor
Yeung Chiu-hoi	Yiu Ho (姚浩; Yiu Ho)	An aircraft maintenance technician.
Grasshopper's Calvin Choi	Ah Wing (阿榮)	Aircraft Maintenance senior technician.
Toby Leung	Apple Tung (童愛蘋; Tung Oi-ping)	Airport Authority staff. Sam's goddaughter, Tucker's girlfriend and best friends with Josie.
Crystal Li	Sandy Fung (馮曉珊; Fung Hiu San)	Airport Authority staff.
Henry Lo	Mingo Fai (費文高; Fai Man-ko)	Airport Authority staff manager.
Kelly Fu	Josie (喬祖思; Kiu Cho-si)	A waitress at the airport's cafe. In love with Issac.
Sugar Club's Kandy Wong	Alizee	Jayden and Summer's half-sister in Episode 30.
Michelle Yim	Manna	Holiday's mom and lover of Captain BJ.
Cheung Kwok-keung	Captain BJ Chong	A retiring Skylette senior training captain and airline examiner, Manna's lover.
Kitty Yuen	Kitty Yuen (阮小儀; Yuen Siu-yee)	Boss of a marriage agency, met Sam through a matchmaking session arranged by Holiday.
Sharon Chan	Pansy	One of Jayden's girlfriends and reporter.
John Duggan	Passerby	Guest star. Passerby.
Stephen O'Neil	Passenger	Guest star. Passenger.

== Music from Triumph in the Skies II ==
Adele 《Crazy For You》

▶ Episode 1 / 2 / 12 / 16 / 22 / 32

Julie London 《Fly Me To The Moon》

▶ Episode 1 / 16 / 22

Adele 《Make You Feel My Love》

▶ Episode 2 / 16 / 23

Chris Winland & Daniel Finot 《Your Laws》

▶ Episode 2 / 10 / 29 / 37

Adele 《Chasing Pavements》

▶ Episode 4 / 9 / 11 / 13 / 16

Rob Bagshaw ft. Tara Chinn 《Smoking Gun》

▶ Episode 4

Patti Austin 《Say You Love Me》

▶ Episode 8 / 10 / 16 / 21 / * 30 / * 31 / * 32

Aaron Edson, Bruce Chianese, Geoff Levin 《We Can Do It》

▶ Episode 11

Peter Marsh 《Stop The Clock》

▶ Episode 12 / 13 (Old Bird) / 29 / 33 / 35 / 39

Billy Joel 《Just The Way You Are》

▶ Episode 12 / 27

林峰 Raymond Lam 《On My Way》

▶ Episode 15 / 16 / 20 / 22 / 24 / 25 / 26 / 30 / 31 / 32 / 33 / 34 / 36 / 39 / 41

Diana Ross 《Ain't No Mountain High Enough》

▶ Episode 16

Mark Britten 《Forever》

▶ Episode 16 / 20 / 22 / 23 / 37

Louis Armstrong 《La Vie En Rose》

▶ Episode 22 / * 32

Peter Marsh 《Changing Times》

▶ Episode 23

Peter Marsh 《Maybe You'll Change Your Mind》

▶ Episode 24 / 26

Peter Marsh 《Throw The Light Away》

▶ Episode 25

Chris Winland & Daniel Finot 《The Circus Of Life》

▶ Episode 26

Chris Winland & Daniel Finot 《Pop Song》

▶ Episode 27

Peter Marsh 《Next To You》

▶ Episode 28

Celine Dion 《S'il Suffisait D'aimer》

▶ Episode 31 / 32 / 33 / 41

《Eternally Yours》

Writer : Tim Ellis

▶ Episode 30 / 31 / 35 & 40

Andy Powell 《I Just Want To Be Here》

▶ Episode 31 / 32 / 33 / 40 (For All)

Peter Marsh 《Leave A Little Room For Me》

▶ Episode 32

《No Don't Cry》

▶ Episode 32 / 34 & 39

《Dry Your Eyes》

Writer : Tim Ellis

▶ Episode 32

== Airport filming locations ==
Some scenes are filmed at or near airports that Skylette flies to:

- Hong Kong International Airport
- Sanya Phoenix International Airport
- Kaohsiung International Airport

Pilot training scenes are from Aeros Flight Training at Coventry Airport.

== Aircraft ==
Hong Kong Airlines A330-200 (leased from Hainan Airlines) B-LNJ were featured in some close-up shots.

Most cabin scenes are filmed at TVB sets and most cockpit scenes are either on board the A330 or the A330 simulator.

== Awards and nominations ==
TVB Awards Presentation 2013

- Won — Best Drama
- Nominated — Best Actor (Francis Ng) - Top 5
- Nominated — Best Actor (Julian Cheung) - Top 5
- Nominated — Best Actress (Myolie Wu)
- Nominated — Best Actress (Fala Chen) - Top 5
- Nominated — Best Supporting Actor (Ron Ng) - Top 5
- Nominated — Best Supporting Actor (Kenneth Ma) - Top 5
- Nominated — Best Supporting Actress (Nancy Wu) - Top 5
- Won — Best Supporting Actress (Elena Kong)
- Nominated — My Favourite Male Character (Francis Ng)
- Won — My Favourite Male Character (Julian Cheung)
- Nominated — My Favourite Male Character (Ron Ng)
- Nominated — My Favourite Female Character (Myolie Wu) - Top 5
- Nominated — My Favourite Female Character (Fala Chen) - Top 5
- Nominated — My Favourite Female Character (Nancy Wu)
- Nominated — Most Improved Male Artiste (Him Law) - Top 5
- Nominated — Most Improved Female Artiste (Oceane Zhu) - Top 5
- Won- Most Improved Female Artiste (Eliza Sam)

== Viewership ratings ==
Week	Episodes	Date	Average Points	Peaking Points
1	01－05	July 15-July 19, 2013	31	35
2	06－10	July 22-July 26, 2013	30	34
3	11－15	July 29-August 2, 2013	30	32
4	16－20	August 5-August 9, 2013	29	
5	21－25	August 12-August 16, 2013	31	32
6	26－30	August 19-August 23, 2013	30	31
7	31－35	August 26-August 30, 2013	31	33
8	36－41	September 2-September 6, 2013	31	33
8	42－43	September 8, 2013	38	41
