= Ghost Writer (Hong Kong TV series) =

- Official poster
- 蒲松齡
- Genre: Supernatural; Fantasy
- Starring: Steven Ma; Linda Chung; Sunny Chan; Fala Chen
- Opening theme: Sam Hiu (心竅) performed by Steven Ma
- Country of origin: Hong Kong
- Original language: Cantonese
- No. of episodes: 25 (list of episodes)

Production
- Producer: Leung Choi Yuen
- Running time: 45 minutes

Original release
- Network: TVB
- Release: June 7 – July 9, 2010

Ghost Writer
- Traditional Chinese: 蒲松齡
- Simplified Chinese: 蒲松龄
Transcriptions
Standard Mandarin
- Hanyu Pinyin: Pú Sōnglíng
Yue: Cantonese
- Jyutping: Pou4 Cung4 Ling4

Ghost Writer is a 2010 Hong Kong television series produced by TVB, starring Steven Ma and Linda Chung. The protagonist of the series, Po Chung-ling, is based on the author of Strange Stories from a Chinese Studio, a collection of Chinese tales on the supernatural. The series tells how he was inspired to write those stories based on his personal encounters with the supernatural, as well as her relationship with Lau Sum-Yu.

== Plot ==
Po Chung-Ling was born in Jinan a family of New Year print. He is very bright, his father, Po Poon, has therefore always hoped that he could one day carry on the family business. Ling, mistakenly thinks that Poon is working in collusion with some corrupt officials, refuses to listen to what his father says. His good friend, Ko Jit, is a constable and he hates corrupt officials as much as Ling does. Rumor has it that a fox spirit is creating troubles in Jinan. Ling is almost killed when he is investigating into the matter with Jit. A mysterious girl named Ling Wu Siu-Tsui comes to his rescue in the nick of time. It turns out later that she is the fox spirit, and that she saves Ling so as to return a past favour. As they spend more and more time together, Tsui starts to fall for Ling.

The Po family has secured a large order of New Year print. To ensure the work can be finished in time they have to hire a large numbers of female workers. Lau Sum-Yu applies for the job, but her real intention is to look for the man who was unfaithful to her sister, never knowing that she would later be caught in a love triangle with Ling and Jit.

== Cast ==
Note: Some of the characters' names are in Cantonese romanisation.

=== Po family ===
Cast	Role	Description
Elliot Ngok	Po Poon 蒲槃	Po Chung-Ling and Po Hok-ling's father Po Bak-ling's uncle Good friends with Cheng Jung-Bong, but finally split up Siu Tsui's lifesaver Dies in Episode 17
Rachel Kan	Tung Wai-yan 董慧欣	Deceased; Po Chung-ling's mother
Rebecca Chan	Yip Wing-Han 葉詠嫻	Po Chung-ling's stepmother Po Hok-Ling's mother
Steven Ma	Po Chung-Ling 蒲松齡	Po Poon's son Love Triangle with Sum Yu and Ko Jit, Sum Yu and Siu Tsui; Bak Ling's younger cousin
Mok Hoi-him	Po Hok-ling 蒲鶴齡	Po Poon's son Po Chung-ling's half-brother Yip Wing-Han's son
Ruco Chan	Po Bak-Ling 蒲柏齡	Po Chung-Ling and Po Hok-ling's older cousin Po Poon's nephew Incriminate Yip Wing-Han; Killed in Episode 22 due to Ko Jit's multiple personality disorder after threatening Cheng Jung-Bong (Villain)
Queenie Chu	Leung Pik-yuk 梁碧玉	Po Bak-ling's wife Incriminate Yip Wing-Han and Chu Po-yin (Semi-Villain)
Kong Wing-fai	Tung Chi-ming 董自鳴	Tung Wai-yan's brother Collude with Po Bak-Ling; Incriminate Yip Wing-Han (Semi-Villain)
Rain Lau	Chu Po-yin 朱寶燕	Tung Chi-ming's wife Incriminate Yip Wing-Han (Semi-Villain)

=== Lau family ===
Cast	Role	Description
Elaine Yiu	Lau Sum-Yin 柳心妍	Sum Yu's older sister Chui Jung-Man's lover A flashback in Episode 4 reveals that Po Bak-Ling raped her Later suffocated to death by Chui Jung-Man's Father after Jung-Man pushed her, causing her to trip and bags of salt crushed her in Episode 7 Flashback (Deceased)
Linda Chung	Lau Sum-Yu 柳心如	Love Triangle with Chung Ling and Ko Jit; Sum Yin's little sister Strangled to death by Ko Jit and becomes a Ghost in Episode 24

=== Ko family ===
Cast	Role	Description
Bak Yan	Song Ho 宋好	Ko Jit's mother
Sunny Chan	Ko Jit 高喆	Soldier; Song Ho's son Ngai Chung's subordinate Crush on Sum-Yu; Initially, Chung Ling's good friend, but eventually enemy Ngan Hung's betrothed Strangles Sum-Yu to death in Episode 24; Committed suicide in Episode 25 (Main Villain)

=== Ling Wu family ===
Cast	Role	Description
Law Lok-lam	Ling Wu Gat-Cheung 令狐吉祥	Fox Spirit; Siu Tsui's grandfather
Fala Chen	Ling Wu Siu-Tsui 令狐小翠	Little Fox Goddess; Involved in a love Triangle with Chung Ling and Sum Yu

=== Other cast ===
Cast	Role	Description
Eric Li	Ngai Chung 魏沖	Head of Magistrate's police force Ngai Hung's adopted brother Ko Jit's direct supervisor Enemies with Ko Jit (Villain)
Charmaine Li	Ngai Hung 魏虹	Ngai Chung's adopted sister Cheng Jung-Bong's daughter Ko Jit's betrothed
Lau Kong	Ma Yuk-Sing 馬旭昇	Cheng Jung-Bong's direct supervisor
Matthew Ko	Chui Jung-Man 徐仲文	Sum Yin's lover
Lau Dan	Cheng Jung-Bong 鄭忠邦	Ngai Chung's uncle Ngai Hung's father (Villain)

== Awards and nominations ==
TVB Anniversary Awards (2010)

- Best Drama
- Best Actor (Steven Ma) (Top 5)
- Best Actress (Linda Chung) (Top 5)
- Best Supporting Actress (Fala Chen) (Top 15)
- Most Improved Actress (Elaine Yiu)

== Trivia ==
- The last episode ends with footage from previous TVB production based on the tales of Pu Songling, namely Dark Tales and Dark Tales II.

== Viewership ratings ==
	Week	Episodes	Average Points	Peaking Points	References
1	June 7–11, 2010	1 — 5	30	33	
2	June 14–18, 2010	6 — 10	32	34	
3	June 21–24, 2010	11 — 14	33	36	
4	June 28 - July 2, 2010	15 — 19	35	37	
5	July 5–8, 2010	20 — 23	35	38	
5	July 9, 2010	24 — 25	37	41	

<Ghost Writer> Average Points 32, Peaking 41.
