= The Other Truth =

Hong Kong television series

- Official poster
- 真相
- Genre: Legal drama
- Written by: Kwan Chung-ling
- Directed by: Au Yiu-hing; Kwan Man-sam; Ng Shiu-wing and others
- Starring: Tavia Yeung; Raymond Wong Ho-yin; Ruco Chan; Louis Yuen; Natalie Tong; Lai Lok-yi; Sam Chan; Li Shing-cheong
- Theme music composer: Yip Siu-chung
- Opening theme: "潛伏" (Hiding) by Ryan Lau
- Country of origin: Hong Kong
- Original language: Cantonese
- No. of episodes: 25 (list of episodes)

Production
- Executive producer: Catherine Tsang
- Producer: Amy Wong
- Production location: Hong Kong
- Camera setup: Multi camera
- Running time: 45 minutes (per episode)
- Production company: TVB

Original release
- Network: TVB Jade, HD Jade
- Release: 27 June – 29 July 2011

The Other Truth
- intertitle
- Chinese: 真相
- Literal meaning: "Truth"
Transcriptions
Standard Mandarin
- Hanyu Pinyin: Zhēnxiàng
Yue: Cantonese
- Jyutping: Zan1soeng3

The Other Truth is a 2011 Hong Kong television legal drama serial produced by Amy Wong and TVB. The drama centers on a group of young barristers and solicitors working in Clayton Hau Chamber and Wallace Cheuk & Co. Solicitors, two fictional law firms in Central, Hong Kong. The Other Truth focuses on ambiguous criminal and civil cases with disputable truths, highlighting the lawyers' strive for impartiality and blind justice.

The drama is Hong Kong's sixth highest-rating serial drama of 2011, and received five top five nominations at the 2011 TVB Anniversary Awards, including Best Drama, Best Supporting Actress (Aimee Chan, Natalie Tong, Helen Ma), and My Favourite Male Character (Ruco Chan).

== Synopsis ==
This court room drama unfold as a group of very individual attorneys are brought together in complex legal proceedings and each lawyer reveals their own story.

Barrister Keith Lau's (Ruco Chan) ambition knows no limits. He will do everything he can in order to win a case, even if it means putting himself at risk.

His good friend Wallace Cheuk (Raymond Wong Ho-yin) runs a law firm. Although Wallace is a qualified barrister, he has no court experience, until Mavis Hong (Tavia Yeung) joins his firm. Thereafter, Wallace's debut meets with loud acclaim.

Their good friend James Wai (Louis Yuen) is a down-on-his-luck lawyer who is financially dependent on his mother: but when a thorny case comes his way, it looks as if his luck has finally changed.

== Criminal cases ==
Major episodes

- "Patricide" (弒父)
- "Uncle Files an Appeal" (阿伯要上訴)
- "A Star's Rape Case" (阿星強姦案)
- "Duplicitous Mother" (蛇心慈母)
- "Kill the Cop" (殺警)
- "Collecting Debts" (收數)

== Cast and characters ==
- Ruco Chan portrays Keith Lau (劉思傑; jyutping: Lau Sigit), the wily pupil of retired judge Clayton Hau. Raised in a very poor urban neighbourhood in Yau Ma Tei, Keith has a strong sense of righteousness and a natural tendency to protect others. Ambitious and fearless, Keith is willing to overstep boundaries to achieve justice.
- Tavia Yeung portrays Mavis Hong (康芷欣; Hong Zijan), who comes from a family of lawyers. She strives to be as successful as her parents, in which her father is an employed judge. Although unbiased and rational, Mavis begins to lose her confidence after dealing with an ambiguous rape case.
- Raymond Wong Ho-yin portrays Wallace Cheuk (卓少謙; Coek Siuhim), Keith's indolent best friend. Although he owns a law firm and is a solicitor himself, he prefers handling the business aspects of his job rather than being a lawyer. To impress Mavis, he decides to try handling a tricky court case himself.
- Louis Yuen portrays James Wai (韋文翰; Wai Manhon), a hardworking but unlucky barrister who rents an office space at Clayton Hau Chamber. Due to James upright and outspoken nature, his parents do not approve of James' career, and rather have him inherit his father's calligraphy ("Four Treasures of the Study") business instead.
- Natalie Tong portrays Cecilia Pun (潘巧如; Pun Haaujyu), Mavis' pupil.
- Lai Lok-yi portrays Danny Mo (毛敬業; Mou Gingjip), a solicitor employed at Wallace's law firm.
- Sam Chan portrays Norman Shum (沈樂仁; Sam Lokjan), Keith's pupil.
- Li Shing-cheong portrays Cheung Yiu-on (張耀安; Zoeng Jiuon), a paralegal employed at Wallace's law firm. He also works as Keith's paralegal.

== Reception ==
=== Broadcast ===
The first three episodes of The Other Truth, aired between 27 June and 29 June 2011 on TVB Jade, peaked at a rating of 32 points with 2.04 million viewers, the second highest premiere week for the first half of 2011 after 7 Days in Life, which peaked at 35 points.

=== Critical reception ===
The critical reception to The Other Truth has been generally positive. Lin Dandan of the Southern Metropolis Daily has given the drama a four out of five stars, lauded that the drama has "captivating court room scenes in every episode, allowing those who love legal dramas to enjoy it to the max." Lin further complimented the casting and their chemistry, describing it as "fresh and attractive. There will be at least one actor who will make you want to see more." Lin especially praised Ruco Chan's performance, saying that The Other Truth is definitely his "representative work [...] the 2011 TVB Anniversary Award for Most Improved Male Artiste already belongs to him."

Netizen's reception is also positive. On Douban, the drama received a rating of 7.9 out of 10 based on 13,000 votes. Shuanglong of Douban also gave the drama a four out of five stars, saying that "although the court room disputes are not as intense as those in the classical File of Justice, the characters in The Other Truth are conflicting and contradictory, with unrevealed truths behind each case." The Other Truth is also one of the most highly discussed dramas of the year at the Hong Kong Discuss Forums.

=== Accolades ===
Year	Award	Category	Recipient	Top 5	Result
2011	My AOD Favourites Awards	My Favourite Drama Series	The Other Truth	Entered	Nominated
2011	My AOD Favourites Awards	My Favourite Actor in a Leading Role	Ruco Chan	Entered	Nominated
2011	My AOD Favourites Awards	My Favourite Actress in a Leading Role	Tavia Yeung	Entered	Nominated
2011	My AOD Favourites Awards	My Favourite Actor in a Supporting Role	Louis Yuen	Did not enter	Nominated
2011	My AOD Favourites Awards	My Favourite Actress in a Supporting Role	Natalie Tong	Entered	Nominated
2011	My AOD Favourites Awards	My Favourite On Screen Couple	Louis Yuen and Kristal Tin	Did not enter	Nominated
2011	My AOD Favourites Awards	My Favourite Top 15 Drama Characters	Ruco Chan	N/A	Won
2011	My AOD Favourites Awards	My Favourite Top 15 Drama Characters	Tavia Yeung	N/A	Won
2011	My AOD Favourites Awards	My Favourite Top 15 Drama Characters	Raymond Wong Ho-yin	N/A	Nominated
2011	TVB Anniversary Awards	Best Drama	The Other Truth	Entered	Nominated
2011	TVB Anniversary Awards	Best Actor	Ruco Chan	Did not enter	Nominated
2011	TVB Anniversary Awards	Best Supporting Actor	Li Shing-cheong	Did not enter	Nominated
2011	TVB Anniversary Awards	Best Supporting Actress	Aimee Chan	Entered	Nominated
2011	TVB Anniversary Awards	Best Supporting Actress	Natalie Tong	Entered	Nominated
2011	TVB Anniversary Awards	Best Supporting Actress	Helen Ma	Entered	Nominated
2011	TVB Anniversary Awards	My Favourite Male Character	Ruco Chan	Entered	Nominated
2011	TVB Anniversary Awards	My Favourite Male Character	Raymond Wong	Did not enter	Nominated
2011	TVB Anniversary Awards	My Favourite Female Character	Tavia Yeung	Did not enter	Nominated
2011	TVB Anniversary Awards	Most Improved Male Artiste	Matt Yeung	N/A	Nominated

== Viewership ratings ==
The following is a table that includes a list of the total ratings points based on television viewership. "Viewers in millions" refers to the number of people, derived from TVB Jade ratings (not including TVB HD Jade), in Hong Kong who watched the episode live. The peak number of viewers are in brackets.

Week	Episode(s)	Average points	Peaking points	Viewers (in millions)	References
1	1 — 5	28	31	1.78 (1.98)	
2	6 — 10	28	32	1.85 (2.04)	
3	11 — 15	29	33	1.85 (2.10)	
4	16 — 20	29	31	1.85 (1.98)	
5	21 — 25	30	35	1.92 (2.26)	

*The highest rating per minute.
