= To Catch the Uncatchable =

25-episode TV drama series

- Promo image
- 棟篤神探
- Genre: Modern romantic Comedy
- Starring: Dayo Wong; Ada Choi; Marco Ngai; Michael Tong
- Opening theme: "衰邊個" by Dayo Wong
- Countries of origin: Hong Kong, China
- Original language: Cantonese
- No. of episodes: 25

Production
- Running time: 45 minutes (approx.)

Original release
- Network: TVB Jade
- Release: July 19, 2004 – 22 August 2004

Related
- To Get Unstuck In Time; War and Beauty

To Catch the Uncatchable (棟篤神探) is a 25-episode TV drama series produced by TVB of Hong Kong, which stars Dayo Wong as the genius (albeit physically weak and with asthma) CID Mok Tsok Tung (莫作棟) and Ada Choi as Vivi Lee Wai Wai (李慧慧), an insurance agent, with Marco Ngai and Michael Tong as major background characters.

The title of the series is of Cantonese word-play and innuendo (the title itself means "The Hilarious God Detective"), and the series itself sets itself apart from other TVB comedies before it thanks largely to the comedic stylings of Dayo Wong, plus new styles of acting and directing and camera work, different styles of plots unheard of before in comedies, and a surprisingly tragic conclusion. The conclusion was met with mixed reception with many complaining it was too upsetting for a comedy. An alternate ending featuring a happy ending was later released.

== Plot ==
The drama is centered around the exploits of Detective Mok (Wong) unmasking murderers that are seemingly somehow related to his "rival" Vivi (Choi). He often gets critical inspiration from unorthodox sources, such as old television programs that his mother (whose face is not seen until later into the series) starred in, which Mok then translates in his investigative work, sometimes to the chagrin of Vivi, who often finds herself at the butt of Mok's investigations.

Thanks to these machinations, Vivi concludes that Mok is the source of her bad luck, which of course leads to her becoming suspected of a number of the murders. However, besides Mok, Vivi has a few thorns of her own: the despicable rival agent and lady-killer Romeo Lo Mat-au (羅密歐, derisively called 蘿蔔歐 lo bak au, which is a derogatory term for Japanese people) by Vivi (played by Marco Ngai), and a clueless smitten admirer in her personal trainer Jim (played by Michael Tong).

As the plot goes on, the couple found out they are, in fact, in love with each other. In later episodes, Mok was rendered unconscious by a murderer using a glass bottle which, coincidentally happened to Jim Jim. Reviving a month later because the blood clot moved, he proposed to Vivi right away. Later, his friend Dr. Yu (played by Hu Fung/胡楓) revealed to him that the blood clot in his brain is moving to a spot that will kill him instantly without any forewarning, unlike Jim Jim, whose clot moved to a safe spot, a bit of news that Mok decided to hide the fact as to keep everyone happy.

In the last episode, while taking a wedding photo with Vivi, Mok spotted a thief sneaking into another's bag and decided to rush out and chase the thief. After chasing the thief, Mok finally caught a thief for the "first" time in his career. After handing the criminal to his colleagues on duty, he told Vivi that he will be returning in 5 minutes on the phone.

In the original ending of the show, after he hung up, he falls down looking towards the sky seemingly happy. Scenes of memories and sorrow background music "Someplace Good" kicks in, with the show ending with the wedding photo of the couple turning black and white with Mok slowly fading away, leaving Vivi alone in the photo, which implies that Mok had died after falling down.

== Reception ==
This ending received a large amount of feedback; in which one side praised it for its groundbreaking, unorthodox dour ending in a comedy drama, in contrast to TVB's usual endings (also known as the "happily-ever-after-plus" ending.) The other side criticized it for the unexpectedly dour ending in a comedy drama, which was too sharp of a contrast to the lightness of the series.

The latter opinion won out after they flooded newspapers, internet forums and newsgroups, and TVB claims that it is an original unedited ending, in which Mok still falls down but managed to get back to the photo shoot, albeit pensively. The alternate ending was shown on 27 August 2004 in local entertainment programme TVB Starbiz (娛樂大搜查), and was not included in any subsequent releases overseas.

The original reports of a sequel for To Catch the Uncatchable suggest that the 2005 Women On the Run (窈窕熟女) is the sequel, despite Women on the Run not being touted as such. Women on the Run has almost none of the original cast from TCTUC in it.

== Characters ==
=== Mok Cheok Tung (莫作棟) ===
A clever yet frail CID of the Hong Kong police force, he uses unorthodox methods and picks up on the strangest of clues that somehow ends up a) involving Vivi in the case and b) busting the correct criminal, sometimes ahead of his boss, the befuddled Inspector Sze Ko But, whose name rhymes with "stupid" (also, Inspector Gadget). Although he was supposed to marry Vivian during the final episode, he was caught up in catching a criminal but started wheezing and supposedly died. The last scene was a montage of Vivian taking wedding pictures by herself and Tung disappears from their wedding photo.

=== Vivian Lee (李慧慧) ===
The "female strongperson" as described by Mok, in the beginning she truly believes that Mok is the one who causes all of her miseries, especially when many of the cases Mok solves during the series somehow involves her, which causes her coworkers to gossip behind her back and attract the unwanted attention of Lo Mat-au, whom she later enjoys a victory before falling to almost certain defeat after Lo's promotion.

During the series, she ends up falling for the man she began despising for the miseries he allegedly were causing her, and the two tie the knot. However, the ending of the series proves inconclusive as to how long they lasted. She ends up marrying Mok.

=== Romeo (Lo Mat-Au)/Daikon (lo bak-au)(羅密歐) ===
Vivi's rival project manager at the Universal Insurance Company; a cunning and conniving man who charms his way into someone's good books before stabbing them into the back to claim the riches for himself. With female clients he charms them, and after he fails to replace Simon as District Manager, he charms the Acting District Manager (Vivi) whilst trying to slight her in front of her chargers, which backfires as Vivi cleverly counters each and every move which frustrates him to no end.

Romeo is often called "lo bat-tau" by Vivi, which literally means "daikon head", but it is often used as a derogatory term for Japanese people.

However, after some clever maneuvers, Romeo finally ends up convincing the Boss to demote Vivi from her position to be replaced by him. But in the end his big ego does him in, for he was caught by Mok (who was undercover and in drag) for distributing illegal substances in a drag bar to his wealthy Mainland clients. As a result of the bad press, Romeo was fired and was never heard from again.

=== Jim Jim (詹霑) ===
A physical trainer born in Toronto, the character played by Michael Tong develops unrequited feelings for Vivi in the series when himself, Mok and Vivi end up training in the same gym. He was initially unaware of Vivi's complete disregard for his feelings, which is caused by Vivi's inability to express to Jim Jim directly that she has no feelings for him.

== Re-run ==
- The show was re-run at midnight from August 25, 2006.
