= To Get Unstuck in Time =

Hong Kong television series

- Promo poster
- 隔世追兇
- Genre: Police procedural Mystery fiction Science-fiction
- Written by: Chu King-kei
- Starring: Roger Kwok; Flora Chan; Patrick Tang; Cherie Kong; Benz Hui; Bill Chan; Kiki Sheung; Ram Chiang
- Theme music composer: Gary Chan
- Opening theme: Fong Yu Kak Sai (恍如隔世) by Patrick Tang
- Country of origin: Hong Kong
- Original language: Cantonese
- No. of episodes: 22

Production
- Executive producer: Lam Chi-wah
- Production location: Hong Kong
- Camera setup: Multi camera
- Production company: TVB

Original release
- Network: TVB Jade
- Release: 21 June – 17 July 2004

Related
- Angels of Mission; To Catch the Uncatchable

To Get Unstuck in Time
- Traditional Chinese: 隔世追兇
- Simplified Chinese: 隔世追凶
- Literal meaning: "chasing the culprit across generations"
Transcriptions
Standard Mandarin
- Hanyu Pinyin: Gé Shì Zhuī Xiōng
Yue: Cantonese
- Jyutping: Gaak3 Sai3 Zeoi1 Hung1

To Get Unstuck In Time is a 2004 Hong Kong mystery/science-fiction television drama produced by Television Broadcasts Limited (TVB) under executive producer Lam Chi-wah.

== Plot ==
The drama stars Benz Hui and Roger Kwok as father and son, who work together across time to solve murders and crimes that occurred in 1984 and present time (2004). The drama is loosely inspired by the 2000 film Frequency.

== Cast and characters ==
- Roger Kwok as "Morning Sir" Ho Tin-kwong (何天光) — the senior inspector of the District Criminal Investigation Department. He communicates with his deceased father through an old phone that he discovered in his house. Together, they solve crimes that occur both during his father's time and present time.
- Benz Hui as Ho Tai-hor (何大河) — Morning Sir's father. He worked as a police sergeant twenty years ago.
- Flora Chan as Ko Shan (高珊) — Morning Sir's love interest. She writes detective fiction novels and is confined in a wheel chair for the rest of her life.
- Kiki Sheung as Cheung Yuet-ping (張月萍) — known as "Sister Mon", she is Morning Sir's mother and Hor's wife. She works as a forensic science technician.
- Patrick Tang as Hugo Yuen Chi-ko (阮志高) — also nicknamed "Ah Hiu", he is a police constable under Morning Sir's CID team.
- Cherie Kong as Lee Sze-ching (李詩菁) — nicknamed "Si Hing" (lit. "Senior brother"), she is Shan's younger cousin. She is a police constable under Morning Sir's CID team.
- Bill Chan as Herman / Ho Ching-nam (賀正南) — Shan's boss.
- Ram Chiang as Ng Wai-fung (伍偉峰) — nicknamed "Wai Fung" (lit. "powerful" or "awesome"), he is a police sergeant under Morning Sir's CID team. He also worked with Morning Sir's father twenty years ago.
- Jerry Ku as Lau Chung (劉忠) — Hor's sidekick and a police constable.
- Henry Lee as Ko King-chueng (高景昌) — Shan's father who is a barrister.
- Law Koon-lan as Leung Miu-lan (梁妙蘭) — Shan's mother who is a piano teacher.
- Matt Yeung as Ko Ming (高明) — Shan's younger brother.
- Siu Leung as Superintendent Chung Kar-ting (鍾家鼎) — Morning Sir's superior.
