= Triumph in the Skies =

Hong Kong drama television series

- Promotional poster
- 衝上雲霄
- Genre: Modern drama
- Starring: Francis Ng; Flora Chan; Joe Ma; Myolie Wu; Michelle Ye; Ron Ng; Sammul Chan; Bosco Wong; Kenneth Ma; Nancy Wu; Shek Sau; Mary Hon; Louisa So; Jerry Lamb
- Opening theme: "歲月如歌" by Eason Chan
- Ending theme: "我不愛你" by Flora Chan
- Country of origin: Hong Kong
- Original language: Cantonese
- No. of episodes: 40

Production
- Producer: Poon Ka Tak
- Running time: 45 minutes (approx.)

Original release
- Network: TVB Jade
- Release: 27 October – 19 December 2003

Related
- Triumph in the Skies II (2013); Triumph in the Skies (film) (2015)

Triumph in the Skies is a Hong Kong drama television series that premiered on TVB in 2003, starring Francis Ng, Flora Chan, Joe Ma and Myolie Wu. The drama tells the lives of pilots working for the fictional Solar Airways based on Hong Kong's Cathay Pacific.

It has been cited as one of TVB's best serial dramas at the time, and there were plans for a sequel to be filmed in 2006. However, it was delayed due to negotiations with an airline to provide support. In May 2011, TVB announced that a sequel was in development, with filming beginning in the early months of 2012. The sequel, titled Triumph in the Skies II, aired on TVB Jade on 15 July 2013.

Triumph in the Skies has been compared to the now-cancelled NBC series LAX. It sparked an interest in aviation when first aired amongst Hong Kong viewers, as well as an interest in a small doll named "Triangel" featured early on in the series.

Location filming included Japan, Italy, and Australia, with sequence shots at Parafield Airport in Adelaide being memorable for their in-depth depiction of flight training.

== Synopsis ==
Triumph in the Skies is about the daily life of the staff of the fictional airline Solar Airways. The show revolves around the friendship of Samuel Tong (Francis Ng) and Vincent Ling (Joe Ma), childhood friends who became pilots for Solar Airways and who have to balance their friendship, professional life, as well as their goals to become Hong Kong's first ethnic Chinese captain. Samuel and Vincent are then thrust into a love triangle relationship with Belle (Flora Chan), an air stewardess with Solar.

After many misunderstandings and lost opportunities, the love triangle came to an end. Vincent and Belle became married, while Samuel became acquainted with Zoe (Myolie Wu), a sick passenger who came to idolize him. She became part of the airport's ground crew due to the hospitality she encountered during that eventful journey back to Hong Kong.

All the while, Solar begins cadet recruitment. Samuel Tong's long lost younger brother Issac (Ron Ng) enters the cadet recruitment to prove to his brother Samuel that he can make it as a cadet, there he meets Chris (Bosco Wong), Donald (Sammul Chan), Roy (Kenneth Ma), and Zita (Michelle Ye) and they subsequently become close friends. Like his brother, Issac is thrust into a love triangle while cadet training in Australia with Zita (Michelle Ye) and Donald (Sammul Chan) which leaves the other two stuck in the middle of the love triangle.

As Belle and Samuel accept each other as close friends, a jealous Vincent grows contentious in his friendship with Samuel. Misunderstandings between Belle and Samuel, led Vincent to the verge of divorce, before seeing the light in his relationship but not before a tragic accident takes his life. Belle spirals into depression and delusional thoughts while grieving for her husband. But Zoe, who has been in an awkward and often one-sided romantic relationship with a much older Samuel, begins to second guess her relationship and decides to let Samuel pursue a second chance with the newly-widowed Belle.

After an eventful journey in their cadet training, the friends pass their cadet training to become pilots with Solar Airways.

== Cast ==
=== Main cast ===
- 唐亦琛 Samuel Tong Yik Sam (portrayed by Francis Ng) - A senior first officer at Solar Airways. Having grown up with best buddy, Vincent, they both strive to be the first Chinese captain at Solar. Straitlaced and serious, he regularly checks his emotions, so he often appears cold-hearted.
- 樂以珊 Isabelle "Belle" Lok Yi San (portrayed by Flora Chan) - A member of the Solar cabin crew, she first met Samuel in Rome and falls in love with him. Due to a misunderstanding, however, she eventually met and fell in love with Vincent, and marries him instead.
- 凌雲志 Vincent Ling Wan Chi (portrayed by Joe Ma) - Sam's best friend and fellow senior first officer. He was a playboy and treated his relationships with women casually, but he later changed his outlook on life. He dies mid-series.
- 蘇怡 Zoe So Yi (portrayed by Myolie Wu) - A bubbly, vivacious and naive person, she aspired to work at the airport after a medical incident on an airplane.

=== Secondary cast ===
- 童希欣 Zita Tung Hei Yan (portrayed by Michelle Ye) - She began her career as the only female trainee pilot in the cadre. Growing up in a single parent family, she repeatedly searched for her father, whom she believes is in Japan.
- 唐亦風 Issac Tong Yik Fung (portrayed by Ron Ng) - The younger brother of Samuel. He grew up believing his mother was his older sister, but finally found out the truth behind his family story. Initially immature and irresponsible, he later became a second officer with Solar.
- 萬浩聰 Donald Man Ho Chung (portrayed by Sammul Chan) - Coming from a wealthy family, he followed his love interest, Zita, into Solar as a second officer, and nurtured a love for that profession.
- 謝立豪 Chris Tse Lap Ho (portrayed by Bosco Wong) - Despite being relatively poorer than Donald, he grew up with him, due to his father's occupation as Donald's father's chauffeur. He aspired for a career in aviation.
- 高志宏 Roy Ko Chi Wan (portrayed by Kenneth Ma) - A poor kid who joined Solar to upgrade and continue the family tradition of being drivers, which is the occupation of all of his family members.
- 凌卓芝 Coco Ling Cheuk Chi (portrayed by Nancy Wu) - Vincent's little sister who lived in Australia until she moved to Hong Kong to join Solar as an air stewardess. Initially jealous of Belle, she is soon won over.
- 唐璜 Phillip Tong Wong (portrayed by Shek Sau) -The previously womanising playboy father of Samuel and Isaac, who works in the airport as their head chef.
- 刑佳美 Cammy Ying Kai Mei (portrayed by Mary Hon) - Wife of Phillip and the mother of both Samuel and Isaac. She and Phillip were separated once, but has since reunited. She later joined the airport as Public Relations Manager.
- 貝嘉露 Ruby Pui Ka Lo(portrayed by Louisa So) - Airport Ground Supervisor and one of Belle's best friends and ex-housemate. She is strict in her work and demands the best in everyone.
- 莫善波 Paul Mok Sin Bor (portrayed by Jerry Lamb) - Zoe's cousin. He initially aspired to be a pilot, but after failing his pilot examination three times, he joined the airport ground staff instead.
- 葉雁婷 Tina Yip Ngar Ting (portrayed by Rebecca Chan) - Zita's mother; training instructor for cabin crew.
- 丘慧琪 Vicky Yau Wai Ki (portrayed by Margaret Chung) - An experienced stewardess onboard Solar aircraft.

=== Recurring cast ===
- Kam Chak Tai (Lok Ying Kwan)
- Tony Ching, Senior First Officer (Patrick Dunn)
- Szeto Hin (Andy Tai)
- Tang Wai Nei (Natalie Wong)
- Chee Sheung Man (Deno Cheung)
- Tong Wan Miu (Fung Hiu Man)
- Chow Wan Tin (Samuel Lau)
- Mimi (Eileen Yeow)

=== Guest stars ===
- Episode 6: Twins
- Episode 26: Eason Chan
- Episodes 34, 37, and 39: Cerina de Graca
- Episodes 34, 37, 39, and 40: Patrick Tang
- Episode 32, 35: Josh Wong, Dave Wong
- Episode 40(end): Fred Cheng, Chris Lai
