= Brian Burrell =

American–Hong Kong actor (born 1972)

Brian Thomas Burrell
- Born: Brian Thomas Burrell; March 23, 1972 (age 54); Salt Lake City, Utah, U.S.
- Other name: 布偉傑
- Occupation: Actor
- Years active: 2001–present

Brian Thomas Burrell (Chinese: 布偉傑, born March 23, 1972) is an American–Hong Kong actor best known for his roles in Cantonese television productions in Hong Kong. Burrell is also one of the few non-Chinese actors in Hong Kong broadcaster TVB's artist profiles over the years.

== Early life ==
Brian was born in Salt Lake City, Utah of British and French ancestry, whose family was among the earliest pilgrims. He graduated from the University of Utah with a degree in Chinese Literature and Asian Studies in 1999. Brian first went to Hong Kong in 1995, and permanently settled there in 1999. He can also speak with different accents and read in Cantonese, Mandarin, Japanese and Khmer.

== Acting career ==
Burrell began his acting career in 2001, when he took a minor role on TVB's A Case of Misadventure (Chinese: 騎呢大狀). Burrell eventually gave up his job in the information technology sector to become an actor, and was later signed on by TVB as an artiste.

He was introduced to television acting by another actor in Hong Kong: Gregory Charles Rivers. Since entering TVB, Burrell has acted in many different television series.

As one of the few non-Chinese actors regularly appearing in Hong Kong TV, Brian was featured in an in-depth interview and feature story Hello Neighbour in the October 2007 issue of Muse.

Since entering TVB, he has acted in many different television series, participated in a number of advertisements, and been an emcee and guest for a lot of variety shows and company events, he left TVB in 2018.
