= A Ma Wat =

Village in China

A Ma Wat Chinese: 亞媽笏
- Village
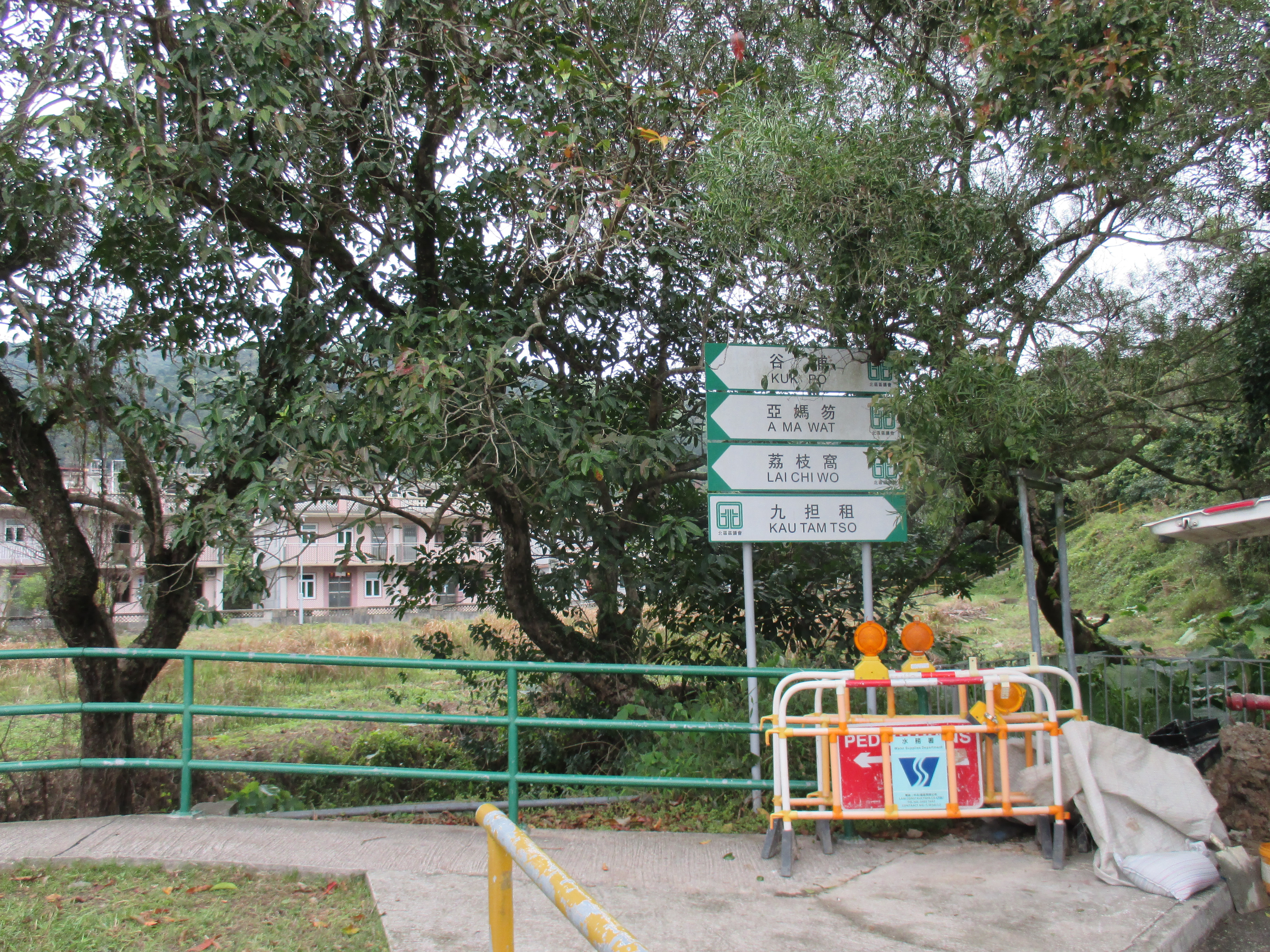
- Sign in Wu Kau Tang showing the way to A Ma Wat

- Location within Hong Kong
- Coordinates: 22.518321°N 114.244096°E
- Country: People's Republic of China
- Special administrative region: Hong Kong
- District: North District
- Time zone: UTC+8:00 (HKT)

A Ma Wat (Chinese: 亞媽笏) is a village in North District, Hong Kong, near Wu Kau Tang and Bride's Pool.

== Statutory status ==
A Ma Wat is a recognised village under the New Territories Small House Policy.
