= Tat Tak School =

- 達德學校
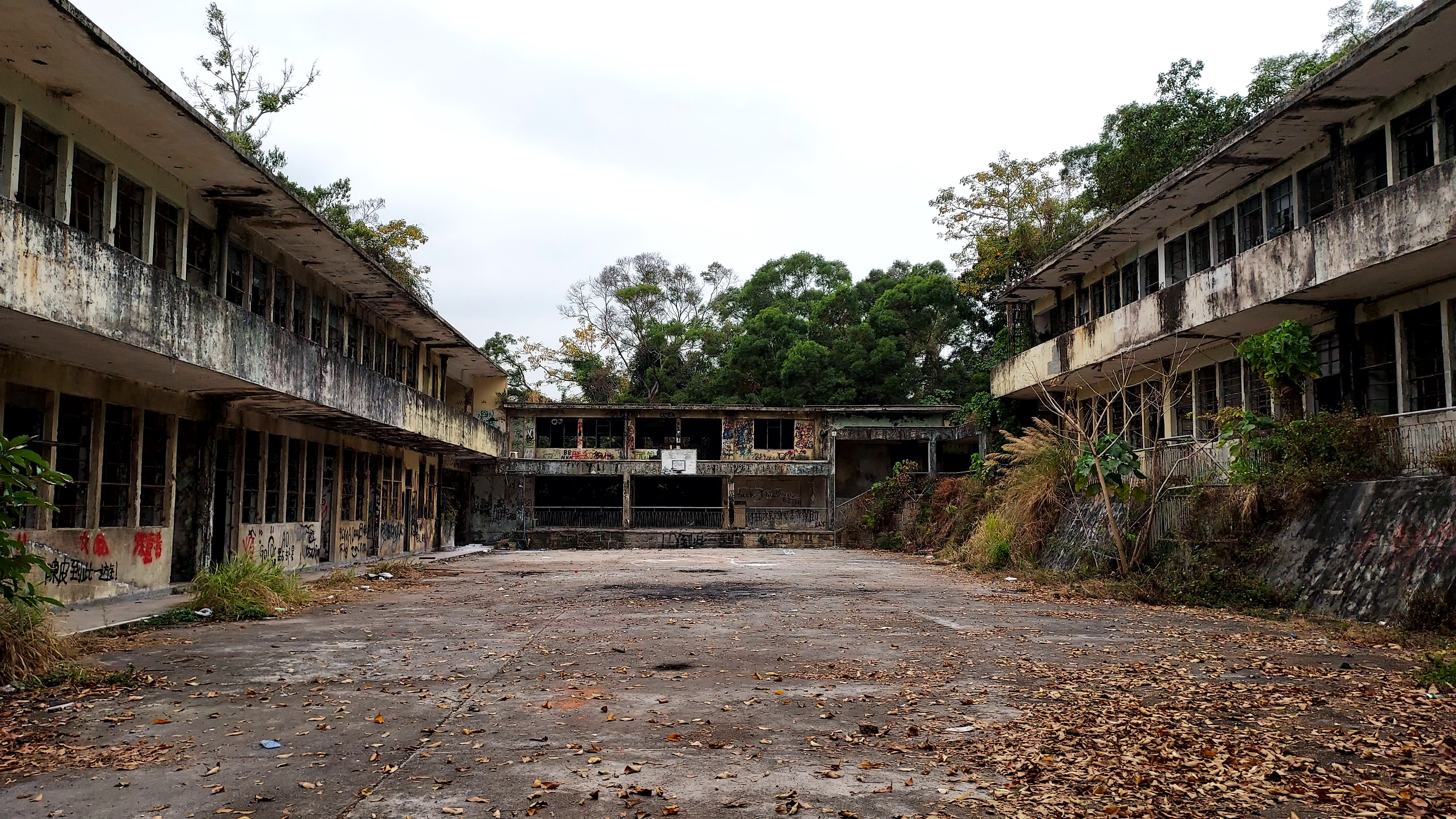
- Abandoned school building, February 2024

Location
- Ping Shan Nam Pak Road, Ping Shan; Hong Kong
- Coordinates: 22.444291°N 114.010739°E

Information
- School type: Public school
- Established: February 1931
- Closed: 1998
- Teaching staff: 20+ (1975)
- Grades: Primary education
- Enrollment: 700+ (1975)

Tat Tak School (Chinese: 達德學校) was a public primary school in Ping Shan, Hong Kong. Founded in 1931 to educate children in the villages, Tat Tak School relocated to the new building in 1965 until its closure in 1998. It is now the most well-known haunted school in Hong Kong.

== History ==
Tat Tak School was established in February 1931 by the Tangs of Ping Shan and philanthropists. First housed in Yu Kiu Ancestral Hall, it is as one of the New Territories' first educational institutions. Classes were suspended during the Japanese occupation. After it resumed in 1943 at Tat Tak Communal Hall, the school moved back to the ancestral hall a year later. As enrollment grew, the school occupied the adjacent Ng Kwai Tong, a former study hall which once offered lessons until Tat Tak School established, in early 1950s to accommodate new students.

Nonetheless, with over 700 students, the old ancestral hall was no longer meeting the demand of space, and thus a new campus was built funded by the Tangs. Upon the completion of construction in 1965, Tat Tak School relocated to the new site. The two-storey new main building is in U-shape, with the hall at the centre and classrooms in the other two wings. The surrounded open area is a basketball court and trees were planted around the school. In 1975 the school had at least 700 students and more than 20 teaching staff, making it the largest primary school in Yuen Long District.

For a period of time from 1983 to 1988, the school was partially leased to the Special Education Section of the Hong Kong Education Department to run one of the Resource Teaching Centres to provide face-to-face remedial teaching for lower secondary school students with learning needs in the area. The centre occupied the four classrooms on the upper level of the east wing of the school. Each service session would accommodate about 60 students from different secondary schools. The service was well received and no major incidents were recorded.

Due to declining enrollment, Tat Tak School closed in 1998. The site has been abandoned since then, with authorities locking the school gate.

Historical locations of Tat Tak School

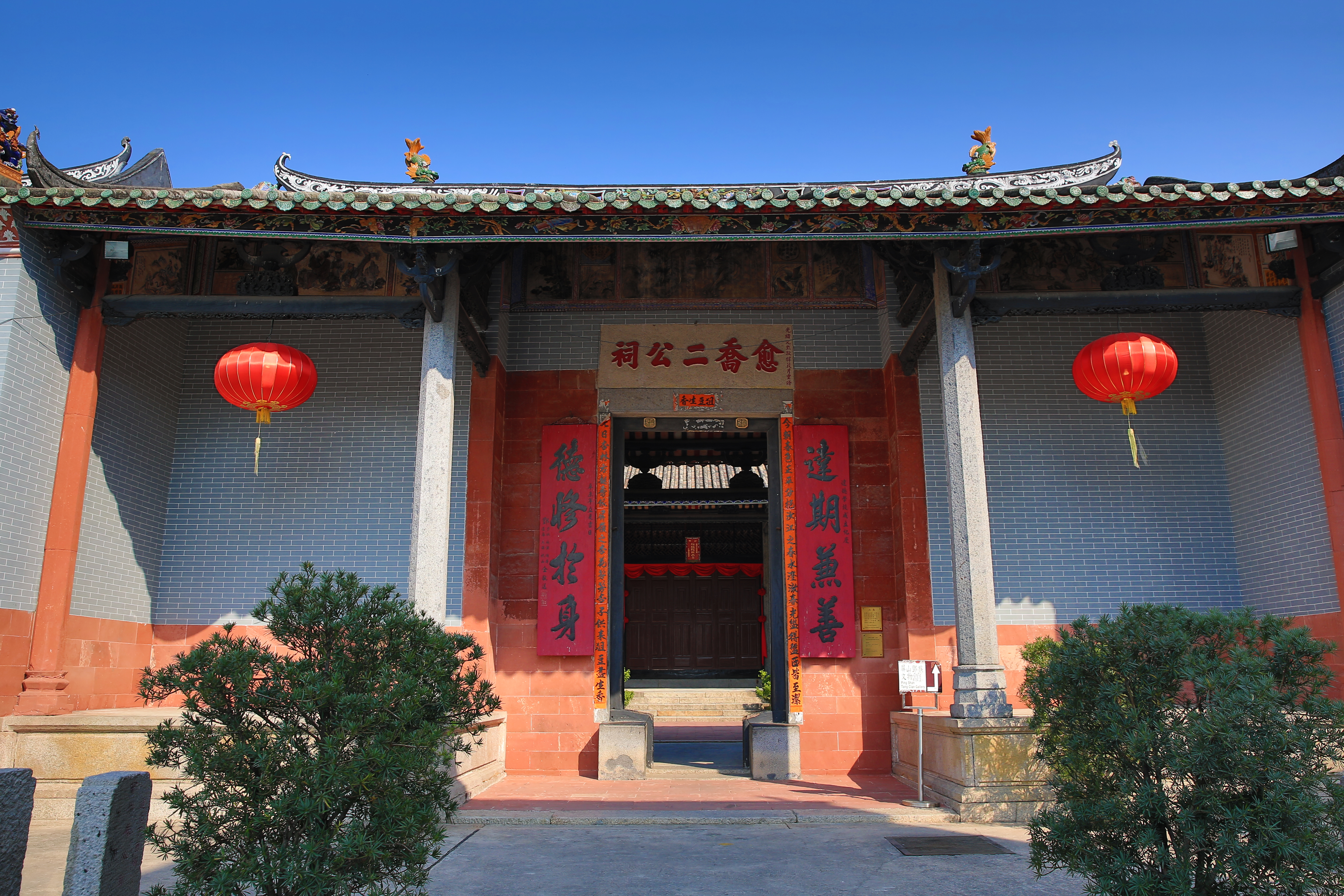
Yu Kiu Ancestral Hall
(used in 1930s)

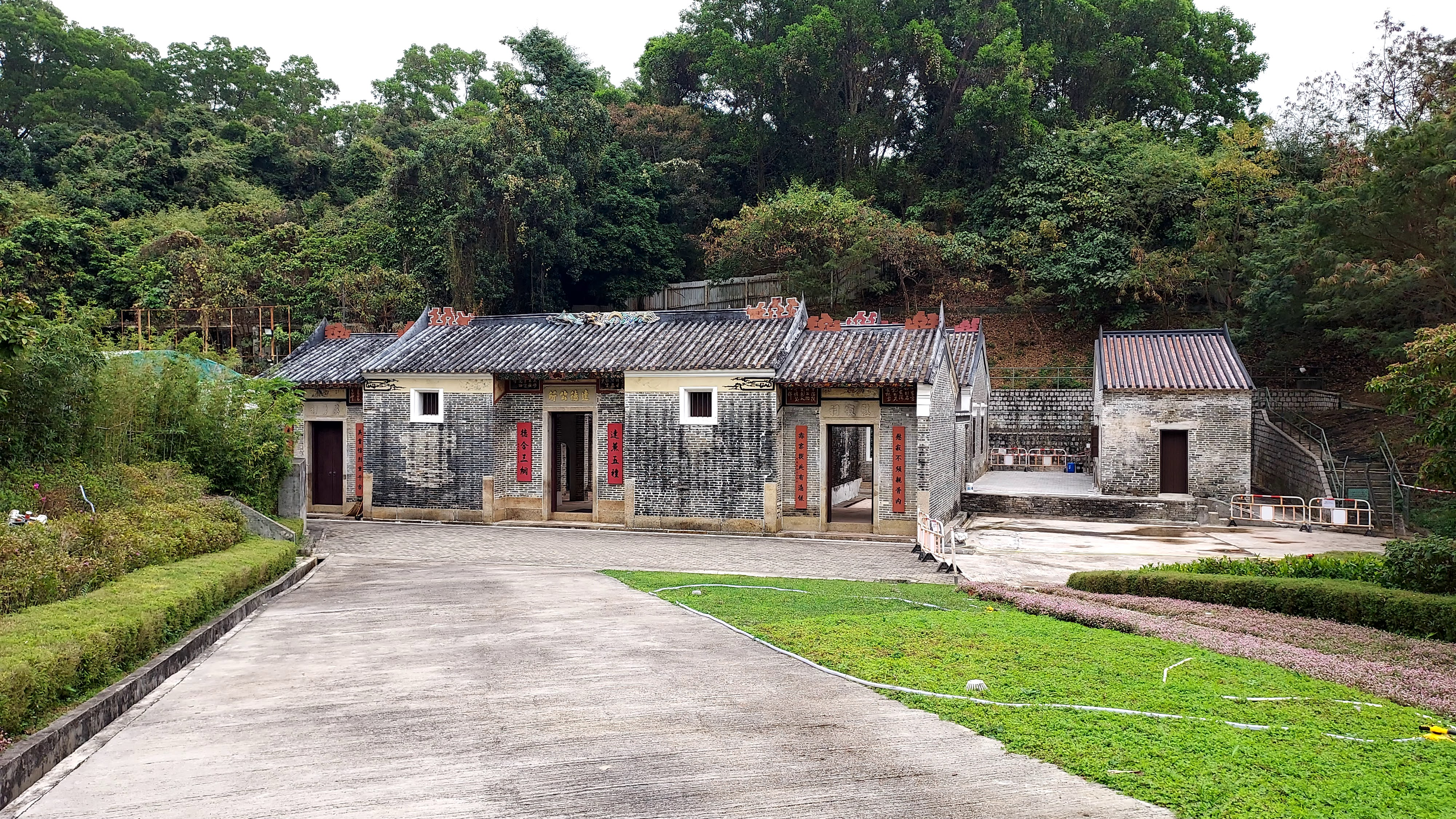
Tat Tak Communal Hall
(used in 1945)

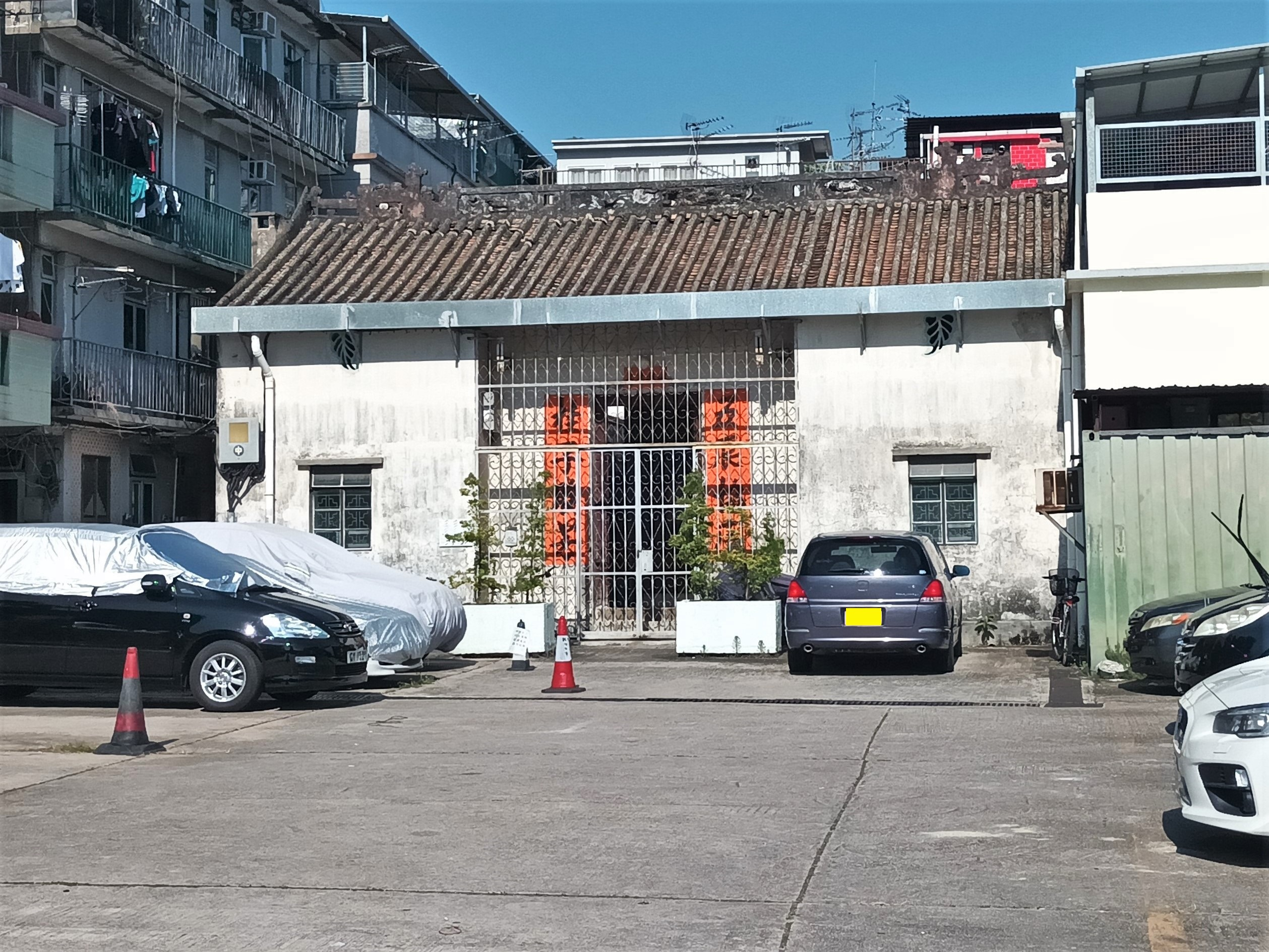
Ng Kwai Tong
(used in 1950s)

== Haunted site ==
Surrounded by graves visible on the road leading to the derelict site, Tat Tak School has been the source of some of Hong Kong's oldest ghost stories, and is one of the most haunted locations in Hong Kong. In 1899, British troops entered the New Territories, ceded by the Chinese, to confront local clans who didn't want to give up their traditional land rights in the Six-Day War. Some 500 indigenous Chinese villagers of Ping Shan were killed and said to be buried at the hillside of the modern-day school. In 1941 Japanese troops killed numerous people and turned the site into a mass grave during the occupation. None of these claims were verified, and villagers said they did not hear any ghost stories either.

One of the most infamous ghost stories is the rumoured death of headmistress, who wore a red dress and committed suicide by hanging in one of the bathroom stalls, after being raped. It is her ghost that is said to haunt the school. But the police had no such record, and William Tang, the Hong Kong fashion designer who once studied in Tat Tak School, said according to tales he heard in childhood, it was the headmaster's wife who died, and at home but not at school.

In 2011, a group of 12 secondary school students visited the site on a daredevil adventure, and heard mysterious whispers and saw a woman dressed in red. Three of the girls fainted, became hysterical and bit others, or strangled herself. One of them claimed to have visions of people dying horrible deaths, and was admitted to the hospital. Academic said the students might have experienced hallucination due to acute psychiatric disorder. A number of war-game players also claim to have seen the ghost of a longhaired teacher.

The site is also now by filmmakers for shooting television dramas or movies. Props left by the crew such as bars fueled false claims that the site was once converted to a prison.

The school was featured in a 2013 TV series I Wouldn't Go in There on the National Geographic channel that delved into the stories behind Asia's most notorious haunted sites.

Tat Tak School (in 2024)

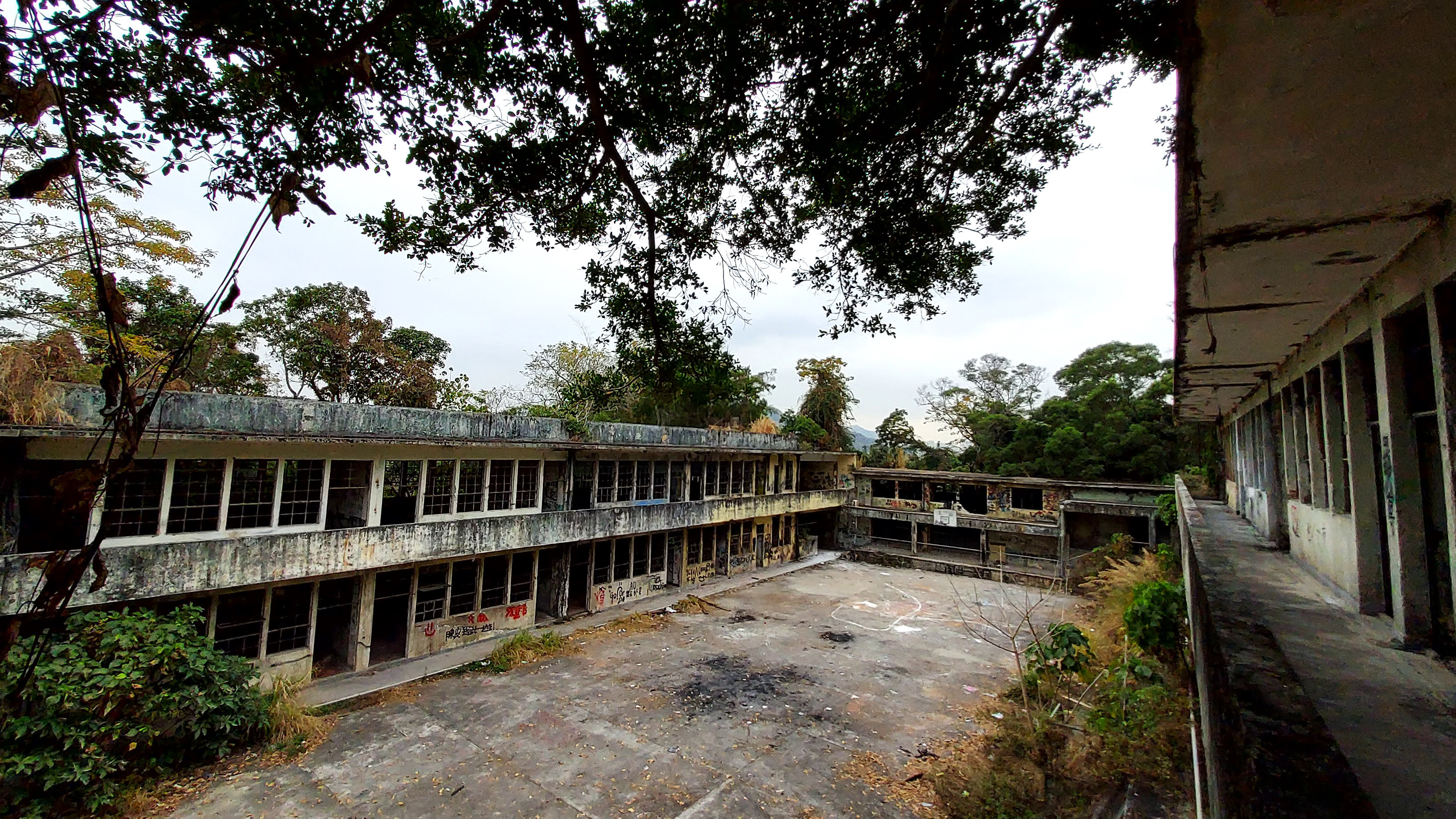

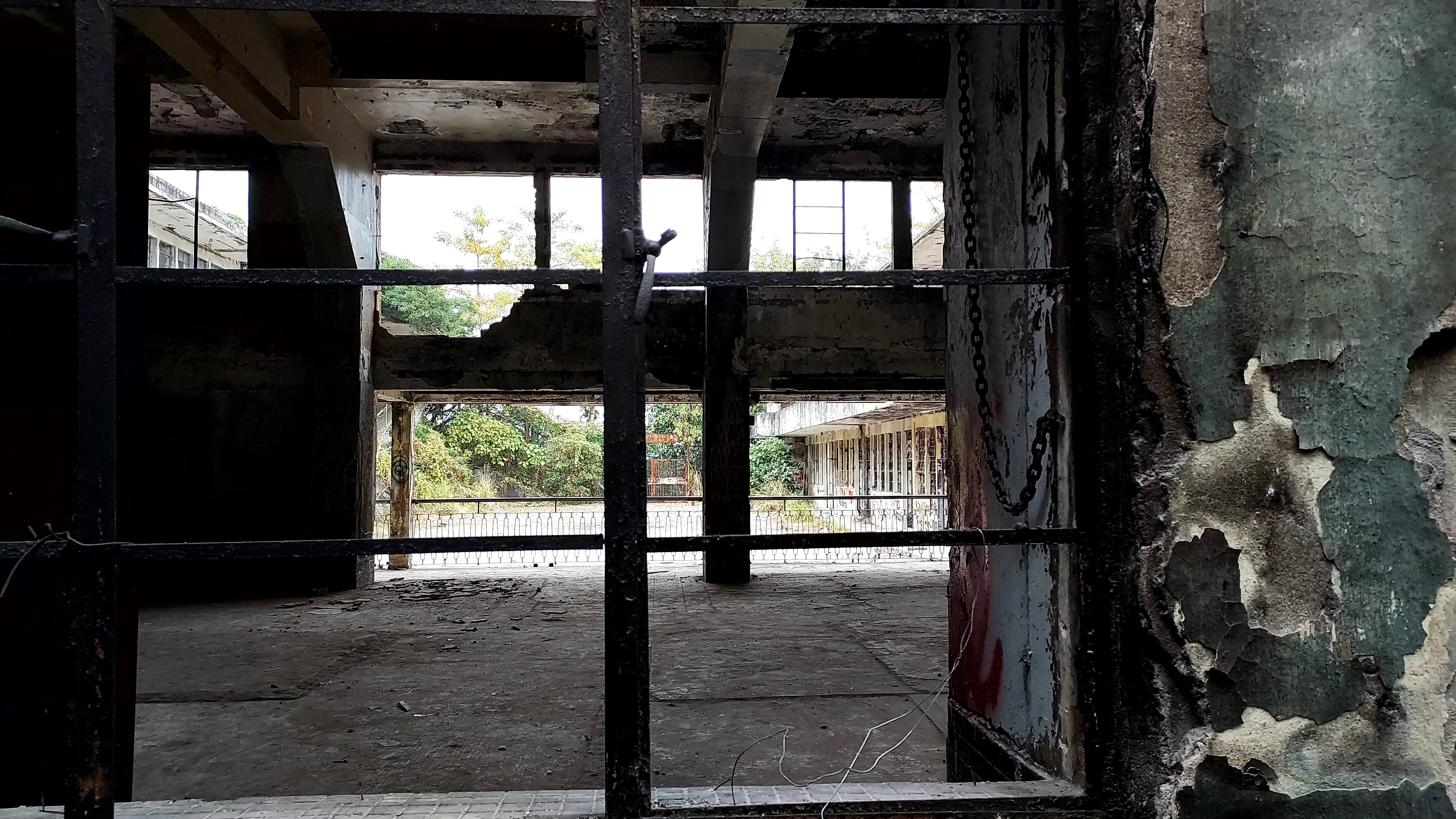

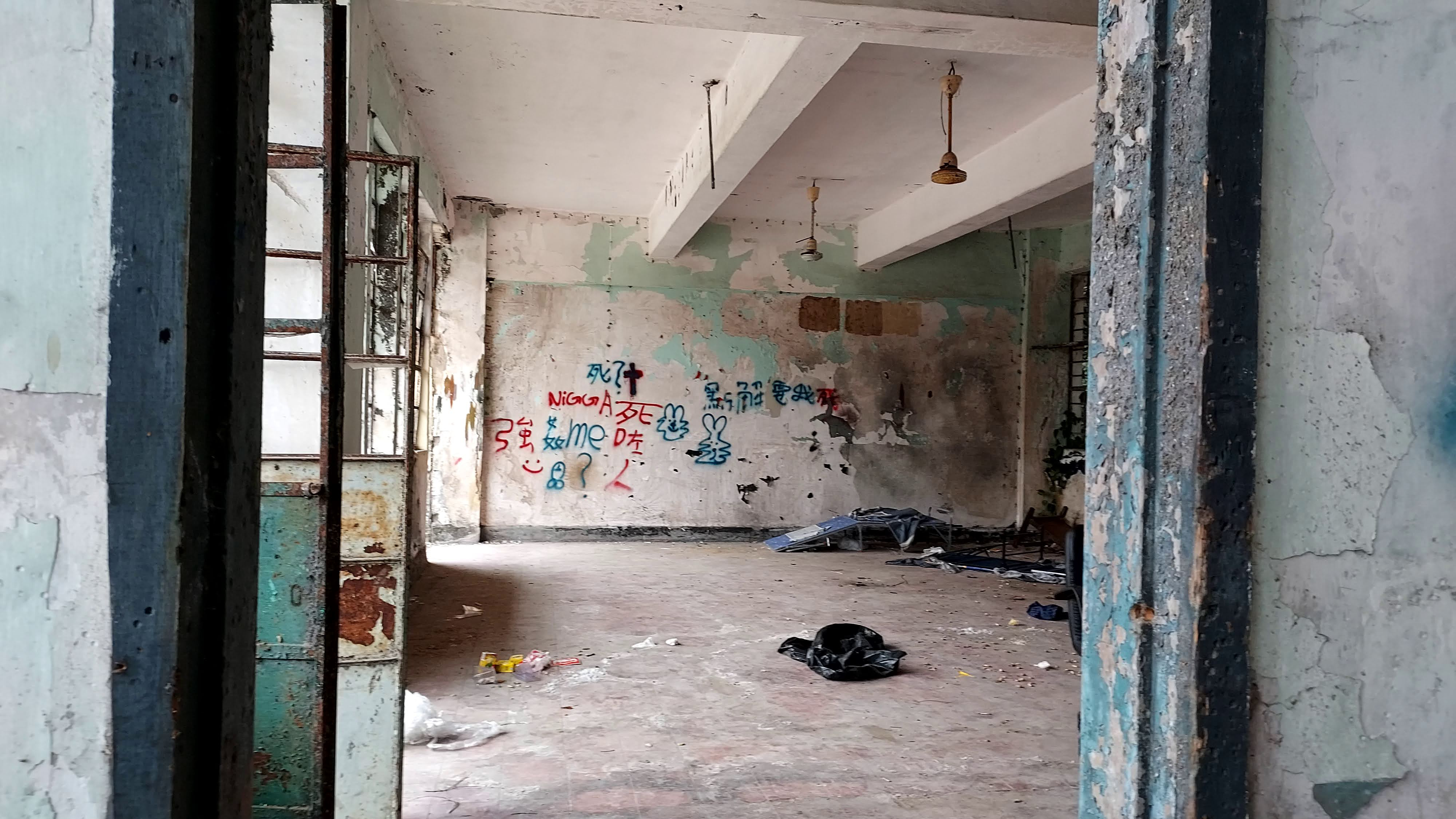

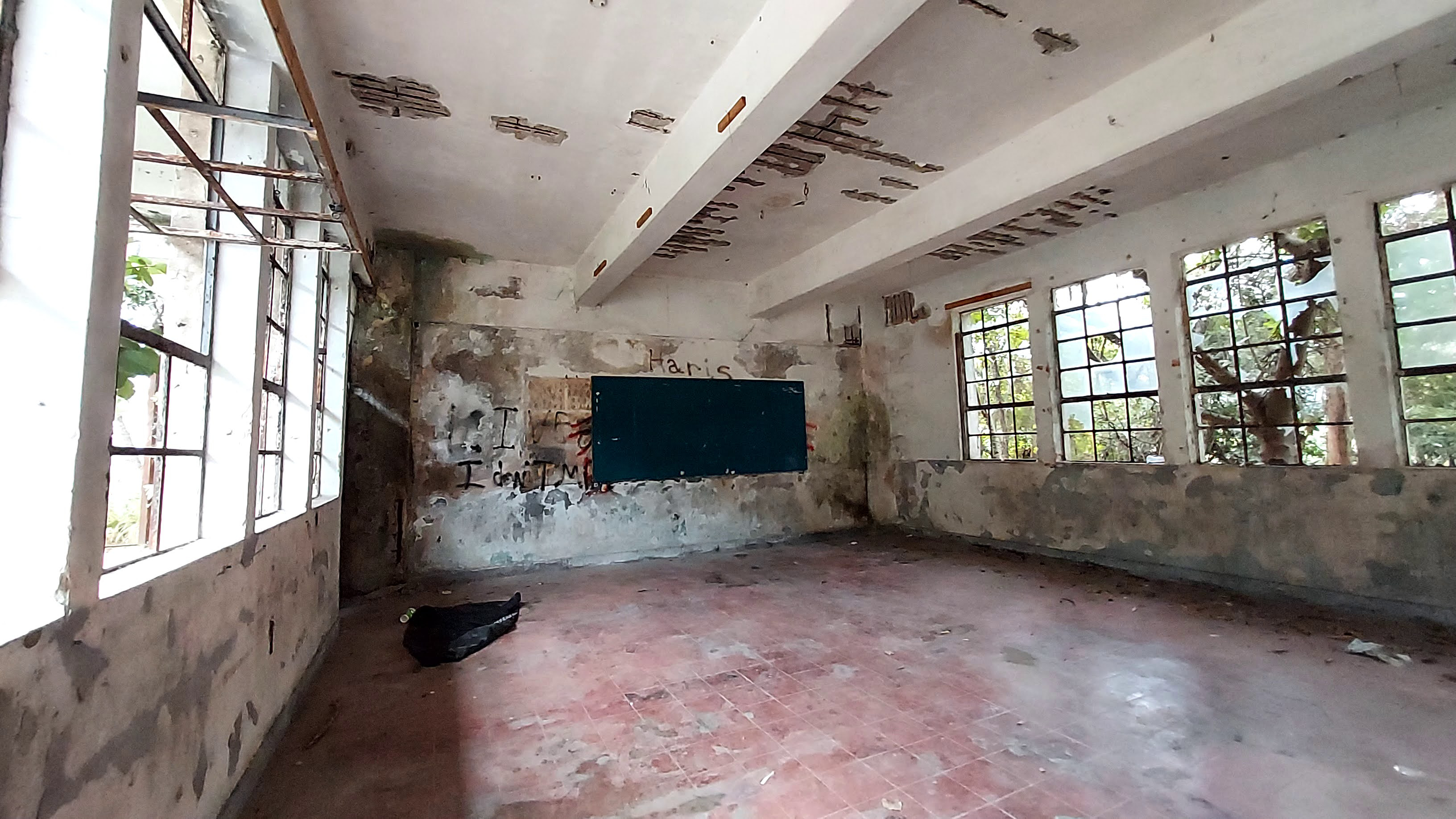

== Notable alumni ==
- William Tang, Hong Kong fashion designer
- Lam Tai-fai, Hong Kong businessman and former legislator

== See also ==
- List of reportedly haunted locations in China
- Our Unwinding Ethos, a 2019 urban legend drama series produced by TVB
