= Til Love Do Us Lie =

- Promo poster
- 結·分@謊情式
- Genre: Modern Sitcom
- Written by: Pang Mei Fung; Poon Man Hung
- Starring: Eddie Cheung; Kiki Sheung; Joyce Tang; Hanjin Tan; Rosina Lam; Benjamin Yuen; Susan Tse; Bowie Wu; Mannor Chan; Suet Nei
- Opening theme: Right on Time by Hanjin Tan & Kiki Sheung
- Original language: Cantonese
- No. of episodes: 136

Production
- Producer: Guan Wing Chung
- Production location: Hong Kong
- Camera setup: Multi-camera
- Running time: 22 minutes (each)
- Production company: TVB

Original release
- Network: Jade; HD Jade
- Release: 31 October 2011 – 11 May 2012

Related
- Be Home for Dinner; Come Home Love

Til Love Do Us Lie (Traditional Chinese: 結·分@謊情式) is a TVB modern sitcom series.

== Synopsis ==
Bobo (Kiki Sheung) has just gotten out of work to become a full-time housewife to take care of her not-so-good son, (Dickson Wong) and become a good wife to her husband, Eric (Eddie Cheung). However, things don't usually turn out the way she wants. Bobo's sister, Mabel, (Joyce Tang) has just failed in love, which causes her to impulsively marry Ngok-Yan (Hanjin Tan). Although she believed it was a mistake in the beginning, time seems to have changed that thought. But as their relationship goes, her mother (Suet Nei), along with a lot of obstacles, seems to be making things difficult for them. Eric's sister, June (Lin Xiawei), spends her time managing her coffee shop while trying to deal with relationship problems. June believes the one she loves is Alvin (Benjamin Yuen), but everyone, including her mother, (Susan Tse) and father, (Bowie Wu) doesn't really think it's a good choice. This series focuses on everyday life and how the characters face problems related to families, friends, love, careers, and dreams.

== Cast ==
- Eddie Cheung as Eric Suen
- Kiki Sheung as Bobo Kan
- Hanjin Tan as Ng Ngok-yan
- Joyce Tang as Mable Kan
- Benjamin Yuen as Alvin Ko
- Rosina Lam as June Suen
- Bowie Wu as Suen Fung-kei
- Susan Tse as Lei Gai-fong
- Jess Shum as 林菁華
- Manna Chan as Gwai Mei-lai
- Suet Nei as Lo Siu-hung
- Dickson Wong as Ocean Suen
- Ronald Law as Ken Kan
- Rachel Poon as Zoe

== Viewership ratings ==
	Week	Episodes	Average Points	Peaking Points	References
1	October 31 - November 4, 2011	1 — 5	25	30	
2	November 7–11, 2011	6 — 10	24	—	
3	November 14–18, 2011	11 — 15	23	—	
4	November 21–25, 2011	16 — 20	24	—	
5	November 28 - December 2, 2011	21 — 25	26	—	
6	December 6–9, 2011	26 — 29	25	—	
7	December 12–16, 2011	30 — 34	25	—	
8	December 19–23, 2011	35 — 39	25	—	
9	December 26–30, 2011	40 — 44	26	—	
10	January 2–6, 2012	45 — 49	28	32	
11	January 9–13, 2012	50 — 54	25	—	
12	January 16–20, 2012	55 — 59	24	—	
13	January 25–27, 2012	60 — 62	24	—	
14	January 30 - February 3, 2012	63 — 67	27	—	
15	February 6–10, 2012	68 — 72	26	—	
16	February 13–17, 2012	73 — 77	25	—	
17	February 20–24, 2012	78 — 82	26	—	
18	February 27 - March 2, 2012	83 — 87	26	—	
19	March 5–9, 2012	88 — 92	25	—	
20	March 12–15, 2012	93 — 96	26	—	
21	March 20–23, 2012	97 — 100	25	—	
22	March 26–30, 2012	101 — 105	25	—	
23	April 2–6, 2012	106 — 110	24	—	
24	April 9–13, 2012	111 — 115	26	—	
25	April 16–20, 2012	116 — 120	26	—	
26	April 23–27, 2012	121 — 125	26	—	
27	April 30 - May 4, 2012	126 — 130	25	—	
28	May 7–11, 2012	131 — 135	27	—	
28	May 13, 2012	136	32	—	
