= Our Unwinding Ethos =

2019 Hong Kong television drama series

- Official poster
- Also known as: Twelve Legends
- 十二傳說
- Genre: Urban Legend, Detective
- Created by: Hong Kong Television Broadcasts Limited
- Screenplay by: Steffie Lai
- Starring: Edwin Siu; Rosina Lam; Jonathan Cheung; Moon Lau; Jazz Lam; Jimmy Au; Angel Chiang; Kirby Lam; Lau Kong; Eva Lai
- Country of origin: Hong Kong
- Original languages: Cantonese, Mandarin
- No. of episodes: 25

Production
- Producer: Wong Wai-sing
- Production locations: Hong Kong, Foshan China
- Editor: Li Qianyi
- Camera setup: Multi camera
- Running time: 45 minutes
- Production company: TVB

Original release
- Network: TVB Jade
- Release: 15 June – 16 August 2019

Our Unwinding Ethos (Chinese: 十二傳說; lit. Twelve Legends) is a 2019 urban legend drama series produced by TVB. The story follows twelve well-known urban legends in Hong Kong. The series stars Edwin Siu, Rosina Lam, Jonathan Cheung and Moon Lau. It is produced by Wong Wai Sing and edited by Li Qianyi. It aired on TVB Jade from June 15, 2019 to August 16, 2019. First overseas premiere on Astro (television) between July 15 and August 16, 2019. The series tied in with the Ghost Festival (Yulan) in July. The series was featured at the Hong Kong International Film and Television Fair (2018) and the TVB Amazing Summer (2019).

== Synopsis ==
Poon Doh-lai (Lin Xiawei) while on-site investigating the legend of the Bride's Pool with her Folklore studies introductory class, witnesses supernatural activities transpiring around the bride-to-be, Topaz (Moon Lau). As the supernatural incidents continues to follow Topaz, she seek help from her journalist friend Fu Chi-Pok (Edwin Siu). Meanwhile, the groom's family is certain that Topaz is a Jinx, who have angered the bride's Spirit, and tries to break off the marriage. Doh-lai and Chi-pok slowly discovers that the legend of the Bride's Pool was in fact used to cover up crimes, including the truth behind the death of Topaz's parents. After the investigation, Doh-lai learns that Chik-Pok was the son of her mentor, Professor Fu (To Yin Gor), who has been missing for seven years. The two decide to finish Professor Fu's dissertation; however, during their research, they encounter several murder cases that used popular urban legends as a cover up. The two became acquaintances with police officer Yik Sir (Jonathan Cheung), who was a supernatural enthusiast. As the different cases unfold, they suspect that Professor Fu is alive and is perhaps captured.

== Cast ==
=== Fu Family ===
- To Yin Gor as Fu Tung-Ming (Professor Fu). Professor of Folklore studies at the International University of Hong Kong. A former teacher and director at Hong Kong Guowen Middle School. For seven years Professor Fu was a missing person and eventually assumed dead. His disappearance is believed to be connected to the Fox Spirit legend.
- Edwin Siu as Fu Chi-Pok. A journalist at Breaking News and student of the Folklore at the Hong Kong International University. He is the son of Professor Fu, despite their estranged relationship, he misses and love his father. His love interest was Topaz, however, their relationship never developed due to his timid character. As the story progresses, he discovers that he had fallen for Poon Doh-lai.

=== Poon Family ===
- Parkman Wong as Poon Mo. Father of Poon Da-li and Poon Doh-mei. Fook-chi's lover.
- Mary Hon as Chen Fook-chi (Sister Fortune). Pawnshop owner and Poon Mo's lover.
- Jazz Lam as Poon Da-li (Master Dali). A metaphysicist and host of radio network program Network One Spirit One. Eldest son of Poon Mo and Fook-chi.
- Rosina Lam as Dr. Poon Doh-lai (Lala). Assistant professor of the Department of Folklore, School of Humanities, International University of Hong Kong. Adoptive daughter of Sister Fortune. Uses the catch phrase: '兇手做咁多嘢,都係想模糊個視線,但係我已經睇清楚佢嘅原點' (The killer has done many things to blur our vision. But I can see the origin clearly now) before revealing/solving a crime. Adoptive daughter of Poon Mo and Fook-chi. Trademark: gold pocket watch.
- Kirby Lam as Poon Doh-mei (Sister Mi). Youngest daughter of Poon Mo and Fook-chi.

=== Recurring cast ===
- Jonathan Cheung as Yik Ming Yin (Yik Sir)
- Moon Lau as Topaz Wong Yuk
- Angel Chiang as Emily Ku Pan Sin
- Lau Kong as Yik Yuen-Kwong
- Tammy Au Yueng as Bala
- Bobo Yueng as Bili
- Lee Yee-man as Pong Chi Mung

=== Guest star ===
- Stefan Wong as Pierre

== Production ==
The series was filmed from November 2017 to April 2018.

=== Language ===
Our Unwinding Ethos is a series originally in Cantonese. The series have Dubbing (filmmaking) available in Mandarin Chinese and Vietnamese language; and Subtitles in Traditional Chinese characters, Simplified Chinese characters, English language and Indonesian.

=== Promotional clips ===
Our Unwinding Ethos - Mini were two-minute promotional clips staged in the format of the TV show's fictional network program: Network One Spirit One. There is a total of five consecutive episodes hosted by Poon Doh-lai (Lin Xiawei)and Poon Da-li (Jazz Lam), inviting some of the main characters to talk about their case.

=== Music ===
The opening theme song "Rumors" performed by Auston Lam, and composed by Alan Cheung was released on July 26, 2019, by The Voice Entertainment Group limited.

"Rumours" was nominated for "Most popular series song" during the TVB Awards Presentation in 2019.

== Location ==
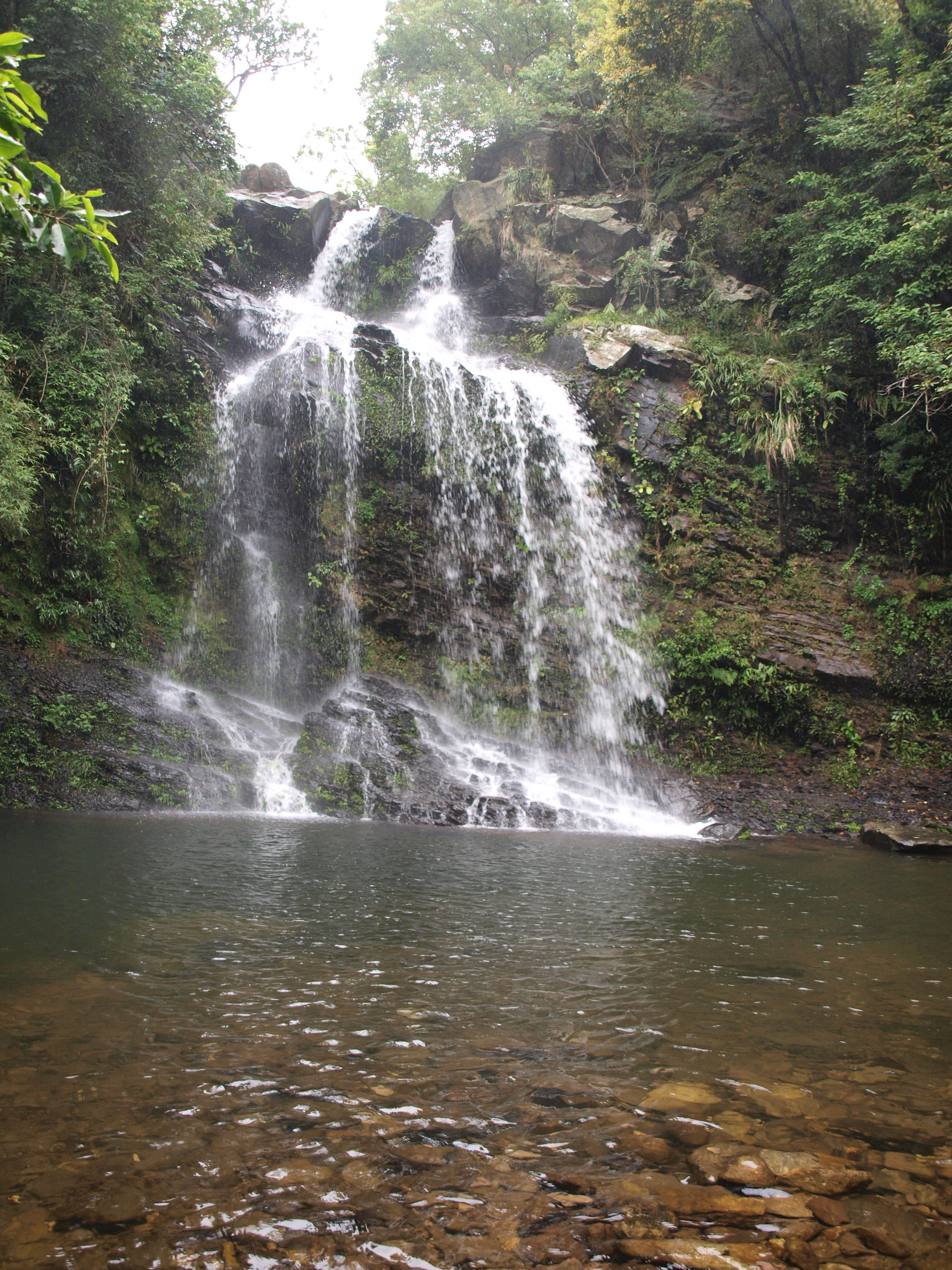
Bride's Pool Waterfall

=== Bride's Pool ===
The local urban legend of the Bride's Pool, located near Tai Mei Tuk in Plover Cove Country Park was used as the setting for the introductory episodes of the series. In the traditional Chinese wedding, the bride would travel by litter (also known as 'sedan') to her groom. It is said that one of the four porters slipped. The bride, along with the sedan fell into the connecting river and she was trapped by the waterfall and washed into the pool below where she drowned, unable to escape due to her heavy wedding dress. The villagers also failed to find the porter.

=== Mirror Pool ===
The Mirror Pool (照鏡潭) Waterfall is located near Bride's Pool in the Plover Cove Country Park. Some have claimed to have seen a bride dressed in a red cheongsam brushing her hair at the Mirror Pool. The spirit of the bride would drag victims into the water to ease her loneliness. Another superstition in China is that the spirit of a person who have been drowned, continues to float along the surface of the water until it can drown another victim to take its place, and this was the only way the spirit can leave the earth or fulfil reincarnation.

==== The Winding Road near the Bride's Pool ====
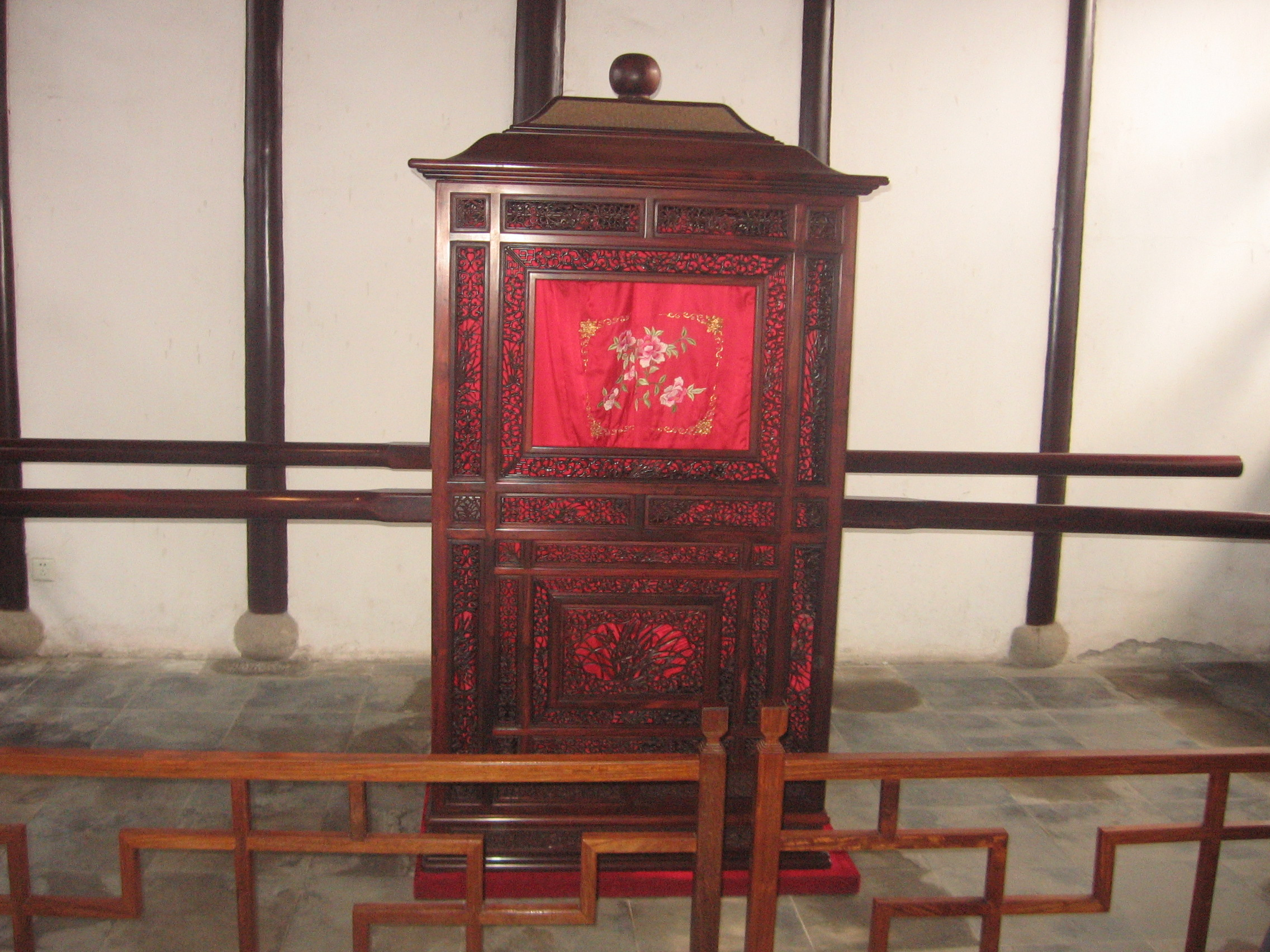
Chinese bridal sedan

In the Hong Kong legend, the bride's spirit would wander the area and favoured the nearby winding road, giving it the nickname "deadly curve". Several fatal accidents have been reported and is believed to be connected the evildoing of the deceased bride's spirit.

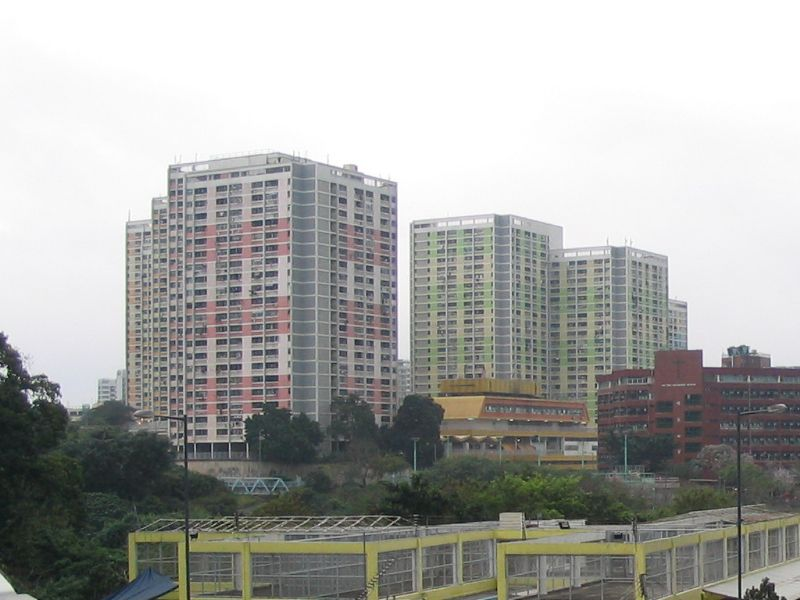
Hong Kong's Wah Fu Estate

=== Wah Fu Estate ===
Wah Fu Estate is a public housing estate located next to Waterfall Bay. It was built on a new town concept in 1967 and was renovated in 2003. The building was used as the backdrop of the UFO story line in Our Unwinding Ethos. In the 1970s and 1980s, the reports of a gigantic mother ship mysteriously hovering over Wah Fu Estate is Hong Kong's most enduring urban UFO myth. Witnesses described a spaceship as wide as a building hovering over the estate, on both occasions late in the afternoon. The craft was so large, they said, that buildings shook as it flew low over the estate.

=== New Territories West ===
A saucer-like shining object was reported in New Territories West in 1978. This site was also used in the UFO story line in episode 9.

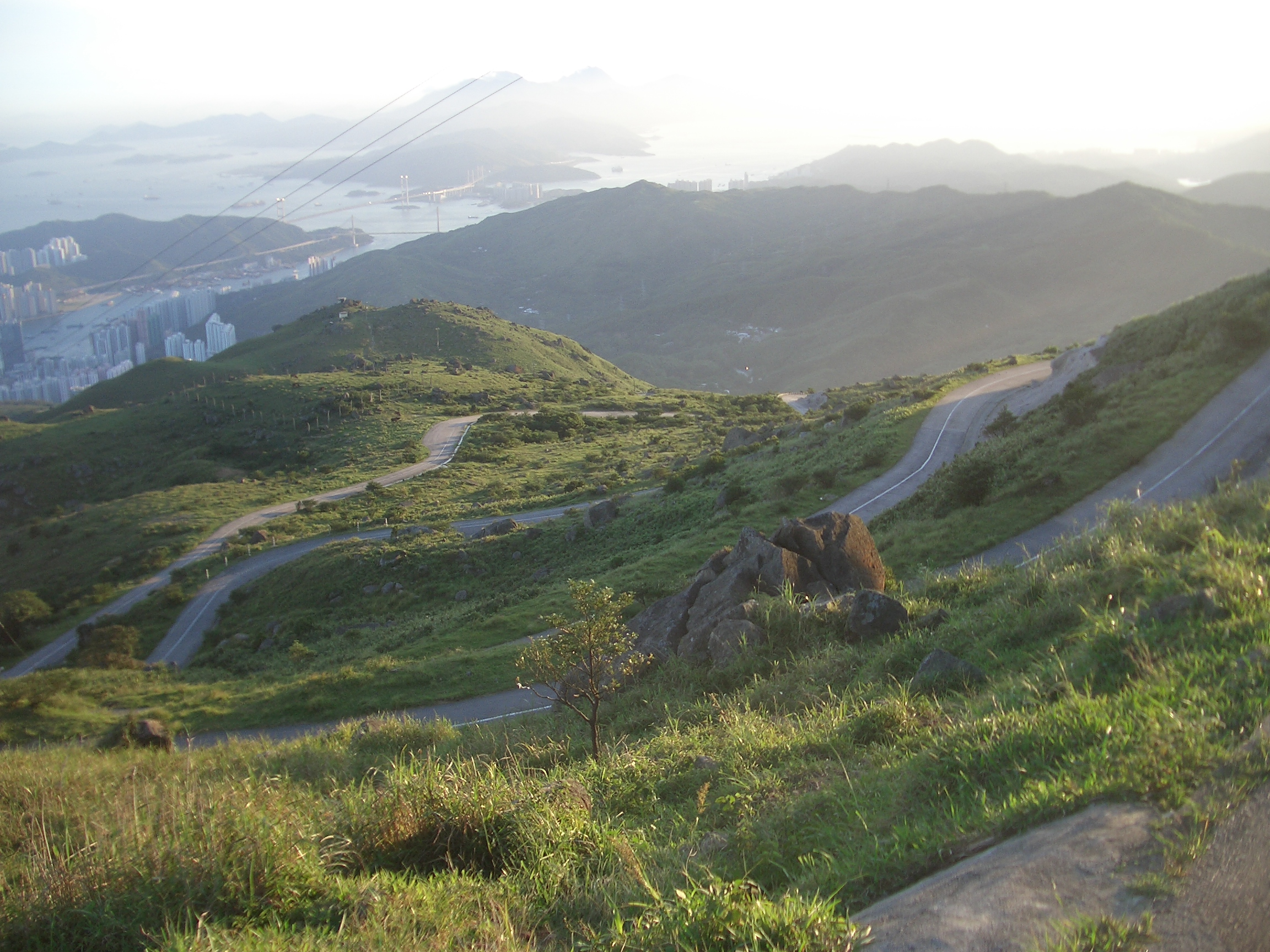
Upper section of Tai Mo Shan Road

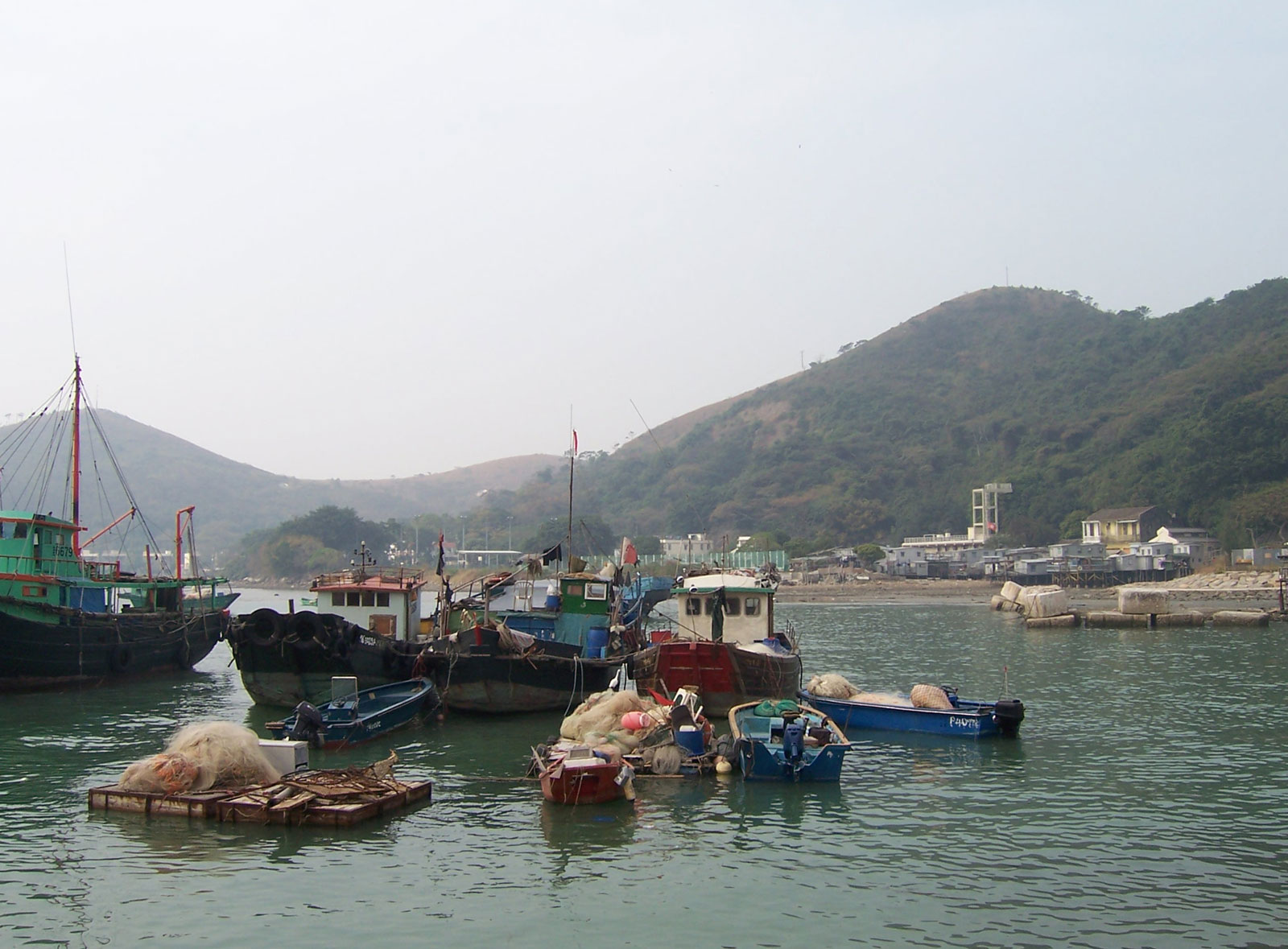
Tai O fishing village

=== Tai Mo Shan ===
Tai Mo Shan is the highest peak in Hong Kong and located at approximately the geographical centre of the New Territories. Tai Mo Shan is an inactive Volcano dating from the Jurassic period. The site is also used for the UFO story line.

=== Tat Tak School ===
Tat Tak School was used as the backdrop for the eighth legend in Our Unwinding Ethos. The building was erected in 1974 and was originally based on the centuries-old Yu Kiu Ancestral Hall in Ping Shan. In 1998, the building closed and gained recognition for its paranormal activities. The urban tale follows the suicide of a headmistress who hanged herself in the female bathroom while wearing red dress. Leaving behind the lingering red-clothed spirit sighted over the years. In Chinese culture, when someone dies dressed in all red, they will return as powerful and angry spirit. The village where the school is located has a history of tragedy, with local residents killed and buried in the area after resisting British efforts to evict them from their land. It has been said that a large number of villagers were massacred in 1941 during the Japanese occupation of Hong Kong, with their remains buried in graves built into the hillside next to the school. Today the site is abandoned and sits permanently guarded behind locked rusty gates.

=== Tai O ===
Tai O is a fishing town, located on the western side of Lantau Island in Hong Kong. The site was used as the backdrop for the Lo Ting Fish-Man myth from episode 11. The Lo Ting is a half-man, half-fish hybrid, that populated the area around Tai Hai Shan, which was also called Tai Yu Shan (Big Fish Mountain), one of the old Cantonese names for Lantau Island. Hong Kong people believe they are descended from this ancient fish-like creature, which transformed into a human body some time in the past 2,000 years. Several ancient Chinese literature references about southern China portraying characters similar to Lo Ting. "New Stories from Canton (Guang Dong Xin Yu)" published in 1662–1722, "Knowledge from Canton (Yu Chung Kin Mun)" from 1777,"Collection of Lingnan Narratives (Ling Nan Cong Shu)" from 1835, "Notes on the South (Nan Yue Bi Ji)" from 1809, "General Records of the Sun On County (Sun On Yu Zin)" from 1819, all contain passages about the half-human and half-fish creatures which were mysterious, able to get in-and-out of the sea quickly, not able to speak human languages, but had tails, red hair and a few other features with different descriptions in different versions.

=== Cheung Po Tsai Cave ===
Cheung Po Tsai Cave is a natural cave located on Cheung Chau Island. During the Qing dynasty, Cheung Po Tsai was one of the many pirates who roved the Guangdong coast. According to urban legend, he had thousands of followers and a fleet of more than 600 ships. The coast and myth of Cheung Po was the setting for the geo-treasure hunt and murder case from episode 19 to 21.

== Episodes ==
Week	Date Aired	Episode No.	Summary
1	15/07/2019	1	Assistant professor of the Department of Folklore, Poon Doh-lai, does an introductory lecture and recalls past events with her professor, Fu Tung-Ming, who has been missing for seven years. As part of the introduction, the class goes on an excursion to the Bride's Pool, and here Breaking News reporter Fu Chi-Pok encounters Doh-lai for the first time and they had a quarrel. Chi-Pok also runs into his colleague Wong Yuk, who was taking wedding photos by the Bride's pool and met face-to-face with strange supernatural activities. Soon after, she was aggressively criticised by her fiancé's grandmother as a Jinx. Meanwhile, Chi-pok finds it strange that Wong Yuk's personality has changed and her eager to get married. Doh-lai's brother Poon Tak-lei, and internet radio host, is having a heated discussion about the haunted Bride's Pool. Despising that someone exploited the tales to commit a crime, Doh-lai together with Tak-lei, Chi-pok and Wong Yuk return to the Bride's pool to investigate the matter. Wong Yuk disappears.
1	16/07/2019	2	Wong Yuk is found soaked and unconscious in the middle of the road. Meanwhile, Wong Yuk's fiancé, Pak Kin-Fung is rushed to the hospital. Chi-pok and Doh-lai learn about the relationship between the two. Doh-lai suspects that someone has deliberately spread the Bride's Pool horror stories, with the intention to cover up a crime. Doh-lai uncovers a clue after a conversation with her sister, Poon Doh-mei about contact lenses. Eventually, they discover that Wong Yuk was adopted as a Child bride after her parents' passing. Doh-lai and Chi-pok suspect that the identity of the perpetrator behind the incidents, however, Wong Yuk insists on getting married as scheduled. Chi-pok cannot bear to see Wong Yuk being wronged and is determined to investigate the truth behind her parents' death in a car traffic accident on the deadly curve, ten years ago. On Wong Yuk and Kin-Fung's wedding day, they get into a car accident while passing the Bride's pool, and Kin-fung is seriously injured and rushed to the hospital. Chi-pok and Doh-lai return to the scene of the accident and discovers a blind spot to solve the case.
1	17/07/2019	3	The truth is revealed, and the marriage between Wong Yuk and Kin-Fung is dissolved. Chi-pok decides to pursue a degree and enrols in the department of folklore. Doh-lai is surprised that Chi-pok is Tung-ming's son. She feels resentful towards his indifferent attitude towards his father's disappearance. Chi-pok is not only absent from his father Tung-Ming's memorial services, but also deliberately tries to sell his father's relics. Doh-lai attempts to stop him, only to find out the reason behind their estranged father-son relationship. Doh-lai leads the freshmen of the Department of Folklore to try and find the inexplicable incidents on the university campus, unexpectedly, there is a Homicide at the female dormitory. Senior Inspector of the Crime Units, Yik Ming-Yin investigates the matter. After assistant professor Koo Pan-sin borrows an office key from Doh-lai, she has an inkling about the matter and the department head, Koo Tsoi-Yung, who may be the murder suspect.
1	18/07/2019	4	Doh-lai continues to have doubts about Tsoi-yung. Meanwhile, Chi-Pok finds that Tung-ming's files have been touched and decides to reorganise the files, and eventually has some findings. Flipping through the campus publications, Doh-lai suspects that Tsoi-yung is related to the Lotus Pond tale. This is linked to an inappropriate teacher-student relationship. Law Wu-ho, reiterates a scandalous rumour from the past. Wu-ho is later found to have committed suicide. However, it is suspected otherwise and Doh-lai becomes a suspect.
1	19/07/2019	5	Wu-ho's wife reveals the truth about Wu-ho's staged suicide. Doh-lai packs up Tung-ming's relics and finds the Hong Kong Urban Folklore index and encourages Chi-Pok to complete the paper as a farewell to his father. The two heads to Banyan Village to verify the tale of the Banyan. They run into the village chief Wong Kan, who is having a conflict with conservationist, Chow Wah-tik. A Paranormal phenomenon occurs at the scene where the banyan tree started to spurt blood. Chi-pok tries to investigate the possible relationship between Yik Yuen-kwong and Ting-Ming, however, Yuen-Kwong claims to not know him.
2	22/07/2019	6	The villagers of Banyan Village engage in a heated discussion about the alleged attack inflicted on the village chief's assistant, Lau Tai-Yue, by the Banyan spirit, whereas Ah Nam suspects that someone had plotted the scene in order to sabotage the land acquisition plan. Following his dog's mysterious death, Ming-yin finds the body suspicious and successfully unravelled the illusion of the Banyan spirit attack. Doh-lai finds that the incidents stem from Yeun Kwong attempts to acquire land many years ago.
2	23/07/2019	7	Upon Yuen-kwong's return to Banyan Village, Ming-yin, Doh-lai and Chi-pok uncover the truth of Wong Kan's death. Yuen-kwong eventually reveals the truth about knowing Ting-Ming. Doh-lai discovers a nameless memorial tablet in Yuen-Kwong's home. Chi-pok's mobile phone is robbed by an informant who would pawn it at Doh-lai's Pawnshop. He learns from Doh-lai's mother, Chen Fook Chi, that his father often visited the pawnshop before his disappearance. Ting-ming still has a lion head on hold at the pawnshop. Tai ma-yuen, an auto services company owner and former gang member, who had competed for the leader position reveal to Chi-pok that he is looking for the triad's long-lost token. Strange things start to happen in the Poon's pawnshop since, and the tale of the stone lion turning into a spirit began to resurface.
2	24/07/2019	8	Doh-lai learns that the person who had pawned a golden longevity peach had also pawned a white jade tiger, she discovers a secret. Chi-pok infers that the stone lion is a token of a Triad name Ka wo. When he goes to Poon's home to retrieve it, the stone lion had already disappeared. He learns that Doh-lai's father, Poon mo, a former Gang member of Yee Fung, was killed by Ka Wo's enemy. Kei Ching-Ching, the girlfriend of murder victim: Poon Yat-Fat, is killed at home, and Man Yau-Fai breaks into Ching-Ching's home to steal another stone lion. The rumour of Poon Mo's ghost starts to spread. Chi-pok and Doh-lai allegedly see the Ghost of Poon Mo in Ma Yuen's garage. Using the gyroscopic effect, Doh-lai not only unravels the mystery of the disappearance of the stone lion but also discovers that the stone lion is hidden in a draw of the pawnshop.
2	25/07/2019	9	Doh-lai unveils the truth behind Ching-Ching and Yat-Fat's deaths. It also turns out that Poon Mo had a narrow escape years ago. The culprit who murdered Mountain Lion has been lurking in the triad. Tsoi-yung holds a lecture about the tale about an Unidentified flying object in Wah Fu Estate in the 1980s. When filming a meteor show on Tai Mo Shan, Chi-pok notices that there is something wrong with the photos, thus reviving the heated conversation about UFOs. Tak lei teams up with Chi-pok, Ming-yin, Tsoi-Yung and many UFO experts and enthusiasts, and travelled to Tai Mo Shan to trace UFOs. That night, there was an unusual glare on the mountain. Chi-pok together with the experts, Law Kau and Yu To-To, goes missing due to the light source.
2	26/07/2019	10	Following the high-profile speculation of the UFO tales, To-To dramatically overthrows all the remarks. Feeling resentful of losing credibility, Law Kau wants to confront To-To. To-To loses his, Chi-pok work partner Yue Tin-Chak tails after him to the rooftop of a building and is surprised to see him jump off the building. Chi-pok is suspected of fabricating news about the kidnapping aliens. Doh-lai finds out why Tung-Ming had entered Chi-pok's dream during the said alien kidnapping. Chi-pok and Doh-lai visits the UFO Fans Club to borrow their old newspaper clippings. Tin-chak has an accident, and chi-pok discovers a strange device on Tin-chak's body. Through the notes left behind by Tin-chak, Chi-pok tracks down a UFO fan named Cheng Chi-Sau.
3	29/07/2019	11	Law Kau claims to have found the aliens, Chi-Pok follows him to Wah Fu Estate and manages to stop him from jumping off the rooftop. The successor of Ko Yuen Group, Hui Hok-Ting, secretly returns from the United Kingdom to Hong Kong. Wong Yuk request Chi-pok to take some exclusive photos, while Wong Yuk follows Hok-ting to a building. Soon after, Chi-pok discovers Hok-ting's dead body beside Wong Yuk who has fainted. Ming-yin's childhood friend, Cheng Hiu-Ying, and her boyfriend, Sze man-bun, discovers the remains of a suspected Mermaid in a cave of Tai O. Ming-yin takes Doh-lai and the others to the scene to investigate. Seizing the opportunity, Hiu-Ying asks her parents about the Lo Ting Fish-Man Mythology. Her mother is extremely frightened by this as it reminded her of her deceased daughter who had Sirenomelia.
3	30/07/2019	12	Hiu-ying has no memory of her childhood. Min-yin discovers the true identity of the mummified corpse in the cave of Tai o, suspecting that Hiu-ying's background is not what it seems. Chi-pok and Wong Yuk reenact Hok-ting's accident, and also learns that Hok-ting was looking for his long lost younger sister. The police arrest Wong-yuk, who is charged with the murder of Hok-ting. On the other hand, it's said that Cheng lui's friend, Chueng Shek-tit, is dead. Doh-lai is confused about the killer's intentions to exploit the Lo Ting Fish-Man mythology to commit a crime. Man-bun's parents, Sze Hon-tak and Sze Yik Mei-kiu, urges Ming-Ying to keep his distance from Hiu-Ying. Cheng Lui is found dead at home. Ho-Tak and Mei-Kiu ask Ming-yin to lie about being Man-Bun's Alibi.
3	31/07/2019	13	Doh-lai sees through the real relationship between Man-bun and Min-yin. Doh-lai initially was suspicious of Man-bun, however, after noticing a broken refrigerator inside the Cheng family, she eventually uncovers the truth behind the Copycat killer simulating the killings of the Lo Ting Fish-Man. Chi-pok and Doh-lai visit the TV station as a guest for a popular program, Doh-lai is very excited to meet her idol Auyeung Kin. Female artist Hung Heung-Shun is later found dead in the Lounge of the TV station. After checking the Closed-circuit television records, Ming-yin finds that among all the people present, only one person had no alibi.
3	01/08/2019	14	Kam lai-man, a producer at the TV station, meets with Wong Yuk in private, recruiting her as the hostess of the next season, fortunately, singer Ho Anthony helps her out of trouble. Another accident happens at the studio, and Ming-yan is killed and crushed by an iron sign. The same accident had happened six months ago. The deceased was Lee Nga-yuet, the classmate of Heung-Shun and Ming-Yan. Auyeng Kin secretly paid tribute to the late Nga-yuet, which lead Doh-lai to pretends to be Nga-yuet. The death of Auyeng Kin was broadcast live online.
3	02/08/2019	15	The suspect is narrowed down and the truth behind the murders is revealed. Doh-mei celebrates birthday with her best friend Yueng Pit-ni, whose boyfriend, Shiu Chi-chung publicly proposes to her. Meanwhile, Tak-lei abruptly announces his marriage to Lee pa-lok, Doh-mei's other best friend. Tak-lei reveals that it is the deed of a female ghost from Tsat Tsz Mui Road.
4	05/08/2019	16	Doh-mei is reunited with her seven best friends, including Sung Yat-hei, however, Chi-chung and Pit-ni appeared to very awkward. One of the member, Chiu Sze-kit, died from brain cancer years ago. Something strange happens to Pa-lok, when she is in the bathroom, so she suspects it's Sze-kit's ghost. Chi-chung is found dead, and Ming-Yin discovers a crystal from the seven best friend bracelets as well as seven strange stones with hair on them. on Pa-lok's wedding day, Pit-ni arrives at the hotel appearing to be normal, however, she was drowned in the bathtub. A doll that represented Sze-kit was found floating on the water next to her.
4	06/08/2019	17	Doh-lai confirms what Pa-lok encountered in the bathroom was a man-made trap, and finds a vital clue to solve the case. Tung-ming's paper outlines a tale of the ghost of Japanese soldiers at Tat Tak School, so Chi-pok, Doh-lai and Ng Ching-sun visited the haunted site of the school to further investigate. Tsoi-yung, Pan-sin and Chiu chi-bun, a documentary producer, happen to arrive there to film a special edition of supernatural stories, and Pan-sin indicates that Chi-bun was one of the students that were possessed by the ghosts of the Japanese soldiers.
4	07/08/2019	18	Yueng Ching-yee was a female student that had committed suicide at Tat Tak School, Doh-lai goes to the haunted washroom to investigate, during which Pan-sin is suspected to be haunted by a ghost. Brother Kwan is invited to perform a ritual at the haunted abandoned school, Kong Shiu-fu suddenly disappears, and later Chi-pok and Doh-lai finds him hanged in the bathroom. Doh-lai asks about the relationship between Pa-sin and Ching-yee, however, Pan-sin deliberately keeps a distance from her. Brother Kwan and On ki-yau dies of poison after attending Shiu-fu's mourning hall. Doh-lai is surprised to learn that Pan-sin and alumni Tai Wa-Hung are also the targets of the murderer, whereas Wa-hung later secretly asks Pan-sin out to meet him. Tat Tak's security, Ling Po-Po, is alumnus Ting Tong-Kit's mother. Tong-kit's mental disorder is caused by campus bullying. Doh-lai discovers an important detail through Tong-kit's paintings.
4	08/08/2019	19	Pan-sin and Wa-hung sneak into Tat Tak School but are shocked to see an alumnus beheaded as if it were an Execution. Doh-lai suspects that some elite students sought to get away with this by exploiting the tale of Japanese soldier ghosts. Ming-yin sets up a trap to lure out the culprit, who eventually confesses the truth about how Ching-yee and Tong-kit were bullied. Chi-pok finds a red cloth while picking up his father's belonging at the pawnshop. Lab reports prove that the red cloth was actually the cultural relic of the Red Flag Gang led by a pirate named Cheung Po Tsai from the Qing dynasty. Chi-pok and Doh-lai interview Pong Chi-Mung, who was one of the members of the treasure hunting group led by Tung-Ming seven years ago, about the whereabouts of the treasure.
4	09/08/2019	20	Doh-lai urges Chi-pok and the others to participate in a geo-finding treasure hunt. Chi-mung and treasure hunting expert Kwong Sai-ho are also participants. Chi-pok persistently ask Sai-hoi about his father's disappearance, however, midway through the treasure hunting game, both Chi-pok and Sai-hoi goes missing. So hau-yue and Ho Chun-fu both have been murdered during the game.
5	12/08/2019	21	Doh-lai suspects that the participants were killed fighting over the treasure. Through the photos of Chun-fu's dead body and suspicious treasure hunting tips, Doh-lai finds the flaws, deducing the identity of the murderer. Having concluded the location where Tung-ming, found the treasure, Doh-lai follows the treaure hunting path but cannot find anything despite her relentless effort. Yuen-kwong reveals the mysterious disappearance of his grandson, Yik Kam-Yin, Chi-Pok comes to realise that Ming-yin was adopted. Ming-yin begs Doh-lai to help investigate the tale of the fox goddess sucking infants, unfortunately Doh-lai wants to look for Tung-Ming.
5	13/08/2019	22	Doh-lai agrees to help investigate the tale of the fox goddess. Ah-Nam tells Ming-yin about how she worshipped the fox goddess and suspects that she had offended the fox goddess as a result. Meanwhile, Chi-pok receives an anonymous email hints Tung-ming's whereabouts. Fox fires appear in Doh-lai's office and so, Ming-yin cannot help but suspect that it was the deed of the fox goddess. Ming yin also discovers Tsoi-Yung's name amongst the guest list.
5	14/08/2019	23	Doh-lai follows the hints of Tung-ming's whereabouts and finds something under the reflection of sunlight. Chi-pok, Doh-mei and Pan-sin find out that Wong Yuk had attempted to strangle Doh-mei. Wong-yuk has no recollection of this and claims that it was the deed of the fox goddess. Doh-lai suspects that it was the trap set up by the culprit. Chi-pok and Ming-yin followed Doh-lai's clues and find the place where Tung-ming was captured.
5	15/08/2019	24	Tung-ming and Chi-pok reunited with mixed feelings. Chi-pok, Doh-lai and Ming-yin once again go to the Fox Goddess temple and cracked the case of the perpetrator who used Teleportation to kill people. Doh-lai follows the clues to the missing grandson.
5	16/08/2019	25	Unveiling Yik's past family grudges at the exhibition venue, Doh-lai not only recreates the scenario of Kam-yin's disappearance at his first birthday banquet. She also unravels the mystery behind Tung-ming's seven years of confinement and reveals the whereabouts of the real lost baby.

== Cross-over with Barrack O'Karma (TV Series) ==
The character of Dr. Poon Doh-lai (Rosina Lam) makes a guest appearance in Barrack O'Karma (2019) in episode 17. The male protagonist, Siu Wai-ming (Joel Chan), visits Hong Kong International University to look for Dr Poon, in hopes to investigate the reason behind the strange and supernatural events at the Twilight Mansion, and its connection to a game called Eerie Mansion. The supernatural genre of Barrack O'Karma opposes to Our Unwinding Ethos's detective plot, to which omits true supernatural events. Dr Poon suggests that the strange events may be a result of a copycat crime using the game to commit murder. She also provides Wai-ming with a novel entitled Sleepwalking, which has characters and a plot identical to the two leads in Golden Night Building. Although Dr Poon suggested that the writer could possibly be a prophet that can see the future, she remain sceptical about supernatural events and firmly believes that there is a logical answer- which is not the case for the supernatural fiction, Barrack O'Karma.

== Rating ==
Hong Kong Viewership with TVB Jade

Week	Episode	Date	Peak Points	Average Points
1	1-5	July 15-July 19, 2019	26	28.2 (First episode)
1	1-5	July 15-July 19, 2019	26	25.5
2	6-10	July 22-July 26, 2019	23	23.3
3	11-15	July 29-August 2, 2019	24	24.4
4	16-20	August 5-August 9, 2019	23	23
5	21-25	August 12-August 16, 2019	24	24.1
5	21-25	August 12-August 16, 2019	24	24.7 (Penultimate)
All episodes			24	24.1

Macau Viewership with TVB Anywhere

Week	Episode	Date	Peak Points	Average Points
1	1-5	July 15-July 19, 2019	17	18.3 (First episode)
1	1-5	July 15-July 19, 2019	17	17.0
2	6-10	July 22-July 26, 2019	16	15.8
3	11-15	July 29-August 2, 2019	N/A	N/A
4	16-20	August 5-August 9, 2019	N/A	N/A
5	21-25	August 12-August 16, 2019	16	16.2

== Awards and nominations ==
Year	Ceremony	Category	Nominee	Result
2019	TVB Awards Presentation	Best Series	Our Unwinding Ethos	Nominated
2019	TVB Awards Presentation	Best Actor	Edwin Siu	Nominated
2019	TVB Awards Presentation	Best Actress	Lin Xiawei	Nominated
2019	TVB Awards Presentation	Most popular TV female characters	Poon Doh-lai (Lin Xiawei)	Nominated
2019	TVB Awards Presentation	Best supporting actress	Angel Chiang	Nominated
2019	TVB Awards Presentation	Best supporting actress	Moon Lau	Nominated
2019	TVB Awards Presentation	Most popular series song	Rumours by Auston Lam	Nominated

== Development ==
- November 13, 2017: Costume Fitting and Blessing Ceremony, Tseung Kwan O Industrial Estate, TVB City Studio One Common Room.
- The show originally had two episode per case, making it a 12-episode series.
- August 12, 2018: Original release date, however, this was temporarily postponed.
- The series was then re-edited into a 25-episode series.
- July 12, 2019: promotional event for Our Unwinding Ethos.
- August 7, 2019: Last promotional event for Our Unwinding Ethos was held poolside.

== Trivia ==
- Episode 11: The fictional airline Solar Airways and Skylette Airlines was a reference to the TV-series: Triumph in the Skies II.
- Although they played good friends in the series, Mary Hon and To Yin Gor are real-life husband and wife.
- The TV series borrowed ideas from TVB's own urban legends. Over the years, some parts of the studio have been rumoured to be haunted.
