= Kau Tam Tso =

Village of Hong Kong

Coordinates: 22.503802°N 114.247871°E

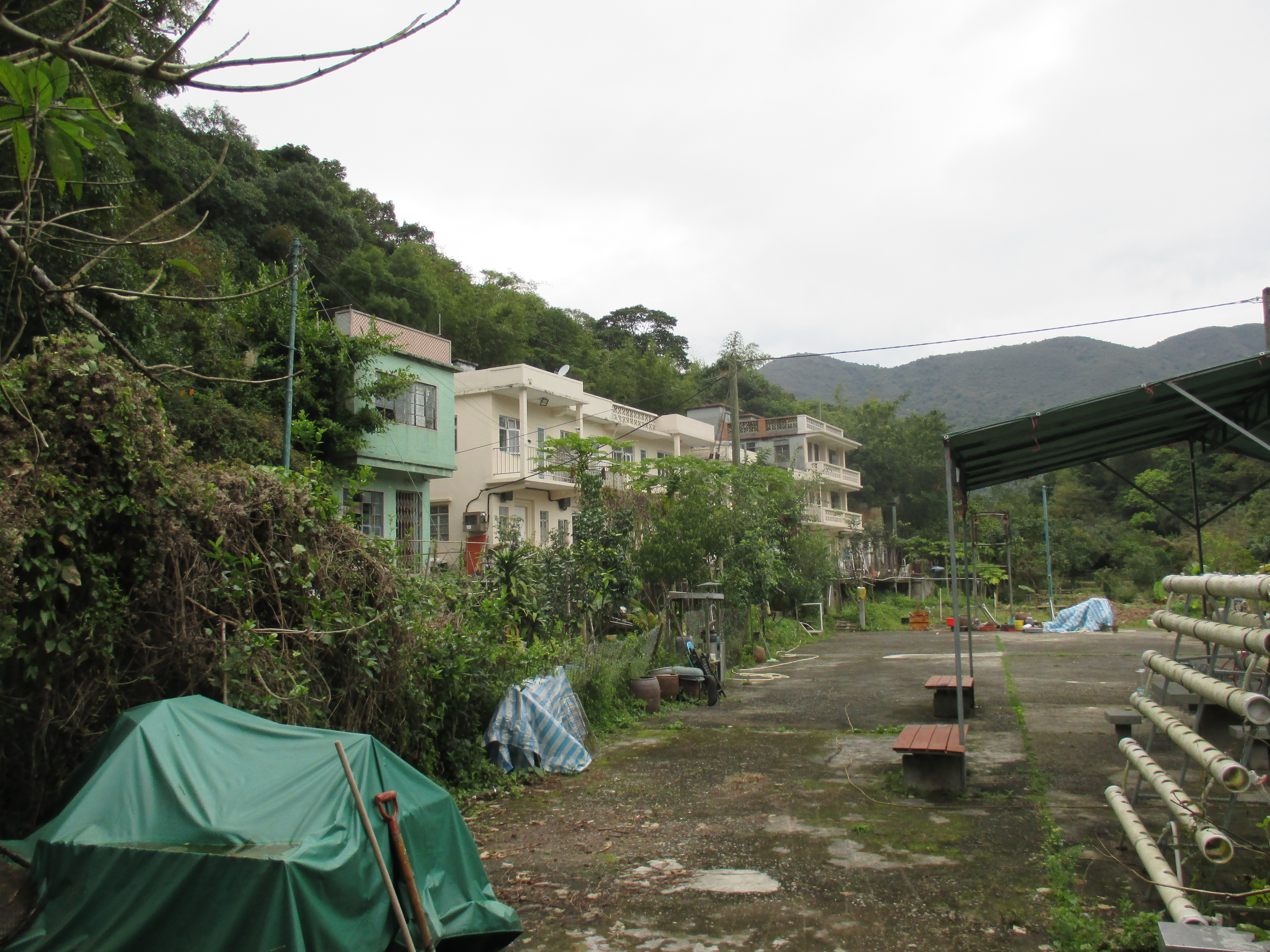
Kau Tam Tso

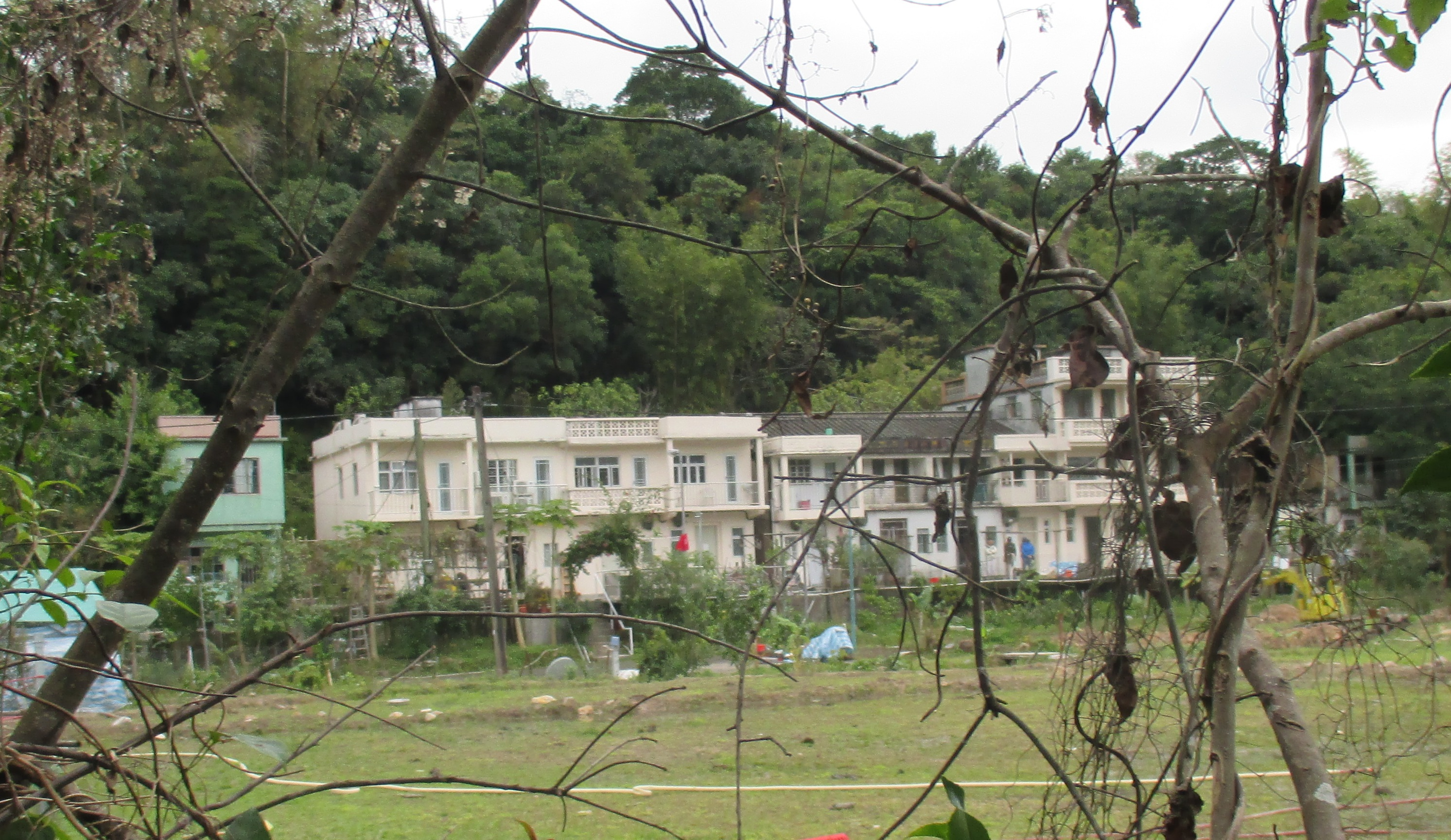
Kau Tam Tso

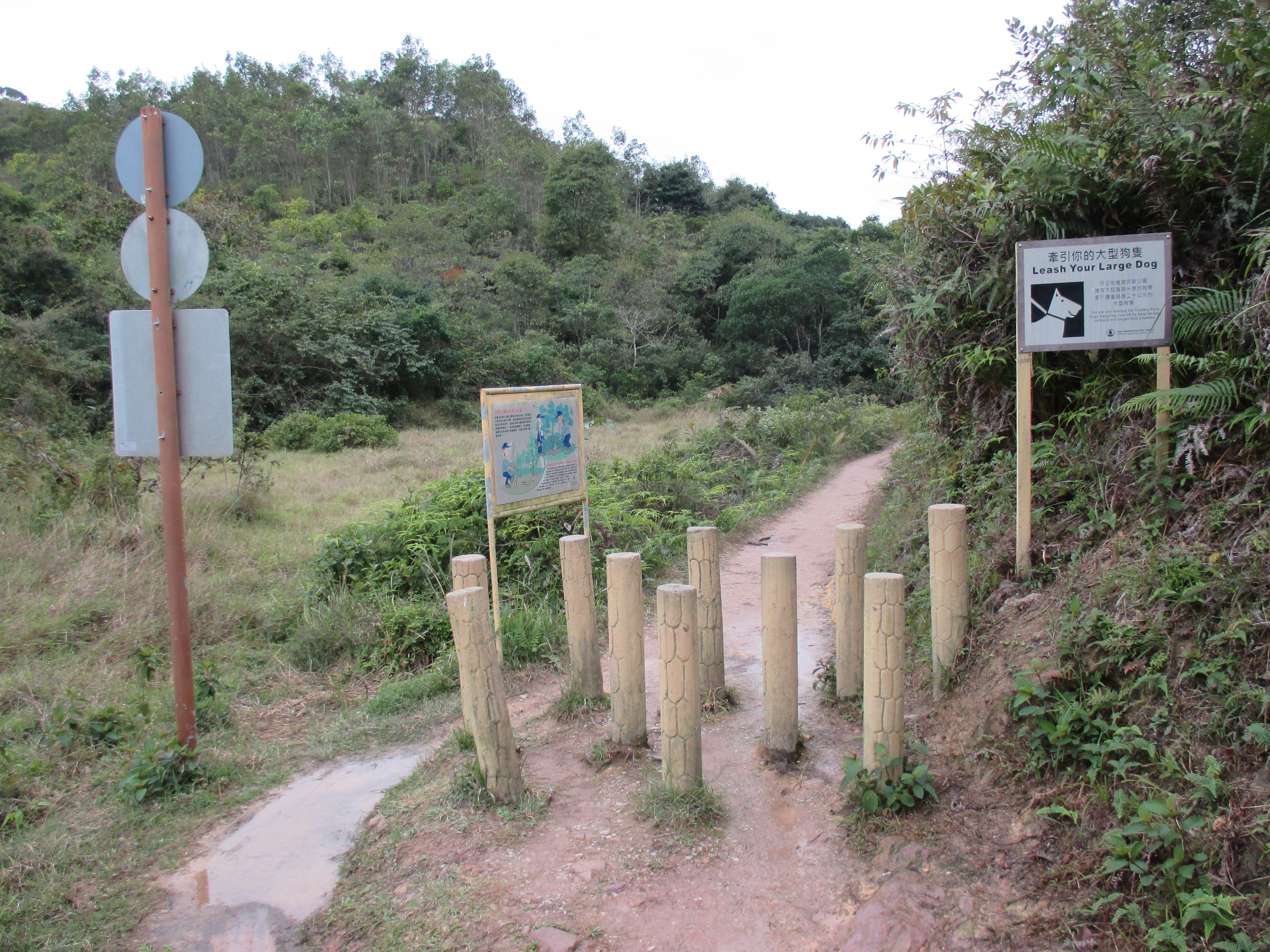
Hiking path near Kau Tam Tso

Kau Tam Tso (simplified Chinese: 九担租; traditional Chinese: 九擔租) is a village in North District, in the New Territories of Hong Kong.

== Administration ==
Kau Tam Tso is a recognized village under the New Territories Small House Policy.

== History ==
The ancestors of the people of Kau Tam Tso Village first came to settle in the New Territories of Hong Kong during the middle of the Qing dynasty. They were nomadic farmers, planting rice and crops, and moved from one part of the New Territories to another before finally settling down in its current location towards the end of the Qing dynasty. Prior to migrating southward to the New Territories, they previously settled in the Bao'an County at the beginning of the Qing dynasty.

The family tree of the Lee Clan in the Kau Tam Tso Village is documented in the Village Name List Book (族譜). This Village Name List Book also holds family tree records that date back to the Tang dynasty in which the first "Lee" ancestor was believed to have come from central China, an area around the current Hubei and Hunan border.

At the time of the 1911 census, the population of Kau Tam Tso was 42. The number of males was 13.

During the two great wars, Kau Tam Tso Villagers joined the Resistance Army with neighbouring villagers and fought against the Japanese occupation. It is believed that, in the vicinity of the current village location, long network of tunnels were dug into the hills as hiding places during the wars. These were later destroyed by the monsoon rains after the second world war. With recognition and sponsorship from the current Government of Hong Kong, a monument has been erected near the entrance to the nearby Wu Kau Tang Village that commemorates those who lost their lives in order for present generations to live in peace. To date, many households still possess Japanese paper currencies that were used during the wars, with the hope that at some point in the future, the current or future Japanese Government will exchange and compensate with today's currencies.

== Traditions ==
During the annual Ching Ming and Chung Yeung Festivals, villagers often visit the burial ground of the couple that first settled in the New Territories to pay their respect, gratitude and sincerity. They were buried in a sacred place overlooking the hilltops that has a grand view of the northeast shores in the New Territories.

== Population ==
Currently, the majority of the villagers reside in the UK, around the London boroughs and in the Greater Manchester districts.
