= Rosina Lam =

Hong Kong actress (born 1987)

- 林夏薇
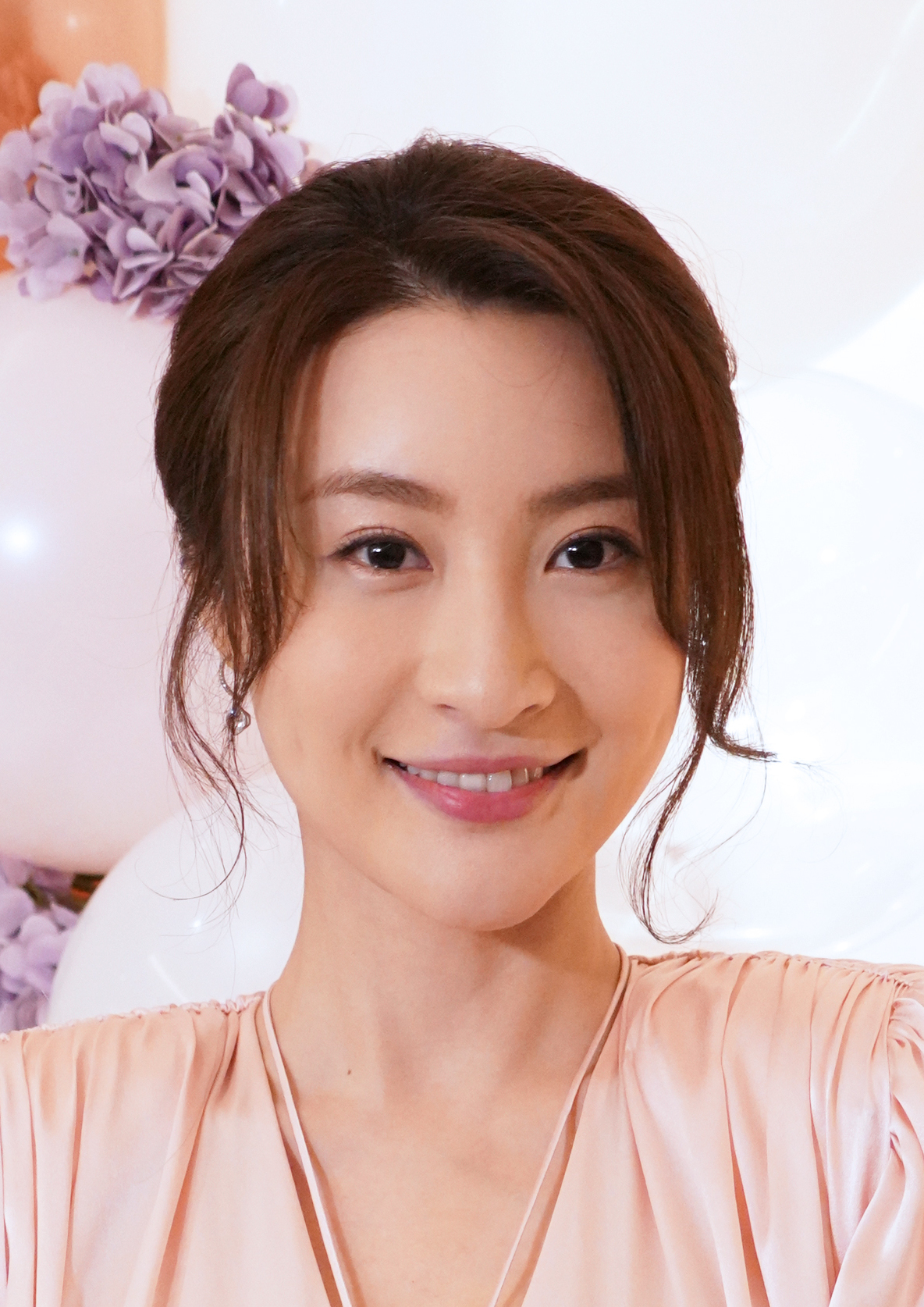
- Lam in 2023
- Born: 30 June 1987 (age 39); Xiamen, Fujian, China
- Occupations: Actress; singer; businesswoman
- Years active: 2010–present
- Spouse: Jason Mok (m. 2015)
- Awards: TVB Anniversary Awards – Best Actress; 2021 Battle Of The Seven Sisters

Chinese name
- Traditional Chinese: 林夏薇
- Simplified Chinese: 林夏薇
Transcriptions
Yue: Cantonese
- Yale Romanization: Lín Xìa-wēi
- Jyutping: Lam4 Ha6-mei4

Rosina Lam (Chinese: 林夏薇; Jyutping: Lam4 Ha6-mei4; born 30 June 1987) is an actress.

== Career ==
With her role in the TVB drama Battle Of The Seven Sisters, Lam won the Best Actress award at the 2021 TVB Anniversary Awards. However, this stirred up controversies among netizens and audience in both Hong Kong and mainland China.

== Personal life ==
In 2015, Lam got married with her out-of-industry boyfriend Jason Mok.

== Filmography ==
=== Television dramas (TVB) ===
Year	Title	Role	Notes
2011	Til Love Do Us Lie	June Suen Ning-On	Major Supporting Role
2012-2013	Missing You	Vincci Ting Fan-Chi	Major Supporting role
2013	The Day of Days	Tong Nga-Man	Major Supporting Role
2014	Outbound Love	Ching Zin-Zan	Major Supporting Role StarHub TVB Award for My Favourite TVB Theme Song; Nominated - TVB Anniversary Award for Best Supporting Actress; Nominated - TVB Star Award for My Favourite TVB Supporting Actress; Nominated - TVB Star Award for My Favourite TVB Promising Female Artiste; Nominated - TVB Star Award for My Favourite TVB Drama Song; Nominated - TVB Anniversary Award for Most Improved Female Artiste; Nominated - TVB Anniversary Award for Most Popular Series Song
2014	Ghost Dragon of Cold Mountain	Yeung Lau	Main Role; Nominated - TVB Star Award for My Favourite TVB Promising Female Artiste; Nominated - TVB Anniversary Award for Best Actress; Nominated - TVB Anniversary Award for My Favourite Female Character
2015	Young Charioteers	Hillary Ling Hei	Major Supporting Role; StarHub TVB Award for My Favourite TVB Supporting Actress; Nominated - TVB Anniversary Award for Most Improved Female Artiste
2015	Eye in the Sky	Scarlett Wong Nga-Ching	Major Supporting Role; Nominated - TVB Anniversary Award for Most Improved Female Artiste
2015	Momentary Lapse Of Reason	Fa Ying-Yuet	Main Role; TVB Star Award for My Top 16 Favourite TVB Drama Characters; Nominated - TVB Star Award for My Favourite TVB Actress in a Leading Role; Nominated - TVB Anniversary Award for Best Actress; Nominated - TVB Anniversary Award for Most Popular Female Character; Nominated - TVB Anniversary Award for Most Improved Female Artiste
2016	Short End of the Stick	Kam Tai-nam	Major Supporting Role; StarHub TVB Award for My Favourite TVB Supporting Actress; Nominated - TVB Star Award for My Favourite TVB Actress in a Supporting Role; Nominated - TVB Star Award for My Favourite TVB Onscreen Couple (with Raymond Cho); Nominated - TVB Anniversary Award for Best Supporting Actress; Nominated - TVB Anniversary Award for Most Popular Female Character
2017	Burning Hands	Ho Ching-Fa	Main Role; Nominated - StarHub TVB Award for My Favourite TVB Actress; Nominated - StarHub TVB Award for My Favourite TVB Female TV Characters; Nominated - StarHub TVB Award for My Favourite TVB Onscreen Couple (with Ruco Chan); Nominated - TVB Star Award Malaysia for My Favourite TVB Actress; Nominated - TVB Star Award for My Top 16 Favourite TVB Drama Characters; Nominated - TVB Anniversary Award for Best Actress
2018	Daddy Cool	Aki Chong Sze-sun (Aki Shoji/Aki Fukuoka)	Main Role; Nominated - TVB Anniversary Award for Best Actress; Nominated - TVB Anniversary Award for Most Popular Female Character
2019	Our Unwinding Ethos	Dr. Poon Doh-lai (Lala)	Main Role; Nominated - TVB Anniversary Award for Best Actress; Nominated - TVB Anniversary Award for Most Popular Female Character
2019	Barrack O'Karma	Dr. Poon Doh-Lai	Guest Role in Ep.17
2021	Sinister Beings	WSGT "Wing" Ma Wing-Sze	Main Role; Nominated - TVB Anniversary Award for Best Actress; Nominated - TVB Anniversary Award for Most Popular Female Character (Top 5); Nominated — TVB Anniversary Award for Most Popular Onscreen Partnership (Top 10, with Ruco Chan); Nominated - TVB Anniversary Award for Favourite TVB Actress in Malaysia (Top 5)
2021	Battle Of The Seven Sisters	Grace Koo Yu-Yin	Main Role; Won - TVB Anniversary Award for Best Actress; Nominated - TVB Anniversary Award for Most Popular Female Character; Nominated — TVB Anniversary Award for Most Popular Onscreen Partnership (with Priscilla Wong, Samantha Ko, Kaman Kong, Jeannie Chan and Venus Kwong); Nominated - TVB Anniversary Award for Favourite TVB Actress in Malaysia
2023	Speakers of Law	Tin Yau-Ka	Main Role; Nominated - TVB Anniversary Award for Best Actress (Top 10); Nominated - TVB Anniversary Award for Favourite TVB Actress in Greater Bay Area; Nominated - TVB Anniversary Award for Favourite TVB Actress in Malaysia
2023	My Pet, My Angel	Paula Kam Wai-Ting	Main Role; Nominated - TVB Anniversary Award for Best Actress; Nominated - TVB Anniversary Award for Favourite TVB Actress in Malaysia
2024	Sinister Beings 2	WSGT "Wing" Ma Wing-Sze	Main Role Nominated - TVB Anniversary Award for Best Actress
2025	Darkside of the Moon	Vivian Cheuk	Main Role Nominated - TVB Anniversary Award for Best Actress

=== Television dramas (Shaw Brothers Pictures) ===
Year	Title	Role	Notes
2022	Mission Run (廉政狙擊)	Ann Chow	Guest Role

=== TV films ===
Year	Title	Role	Notes/Ref.
2024	Dreams in Hengqin (尋夢琴澳)	Fong Ci-ci	Main Role

=== Films ===
Year	Title	Role	Notes
2010	The Color of a Rainbow (彩虹的颜色)	Li Qing-qing (李青青)	
2010	We Will Graduate Together in Summer (我们毕业的夏天)	Sun Jing (孙锦)	
2010	Heaven and Hell (天堂与地狱)	Mei Mei (眉眉)	
2011	The Fortune Buddies (劲抽福禄寿)	Customer	Cameo
2012	I Love Hong Kong 2012		
