= Wu Kau Tang =

Village and area of Hong Kong

Coordinates: 22°30′25″N 114°14′33″E

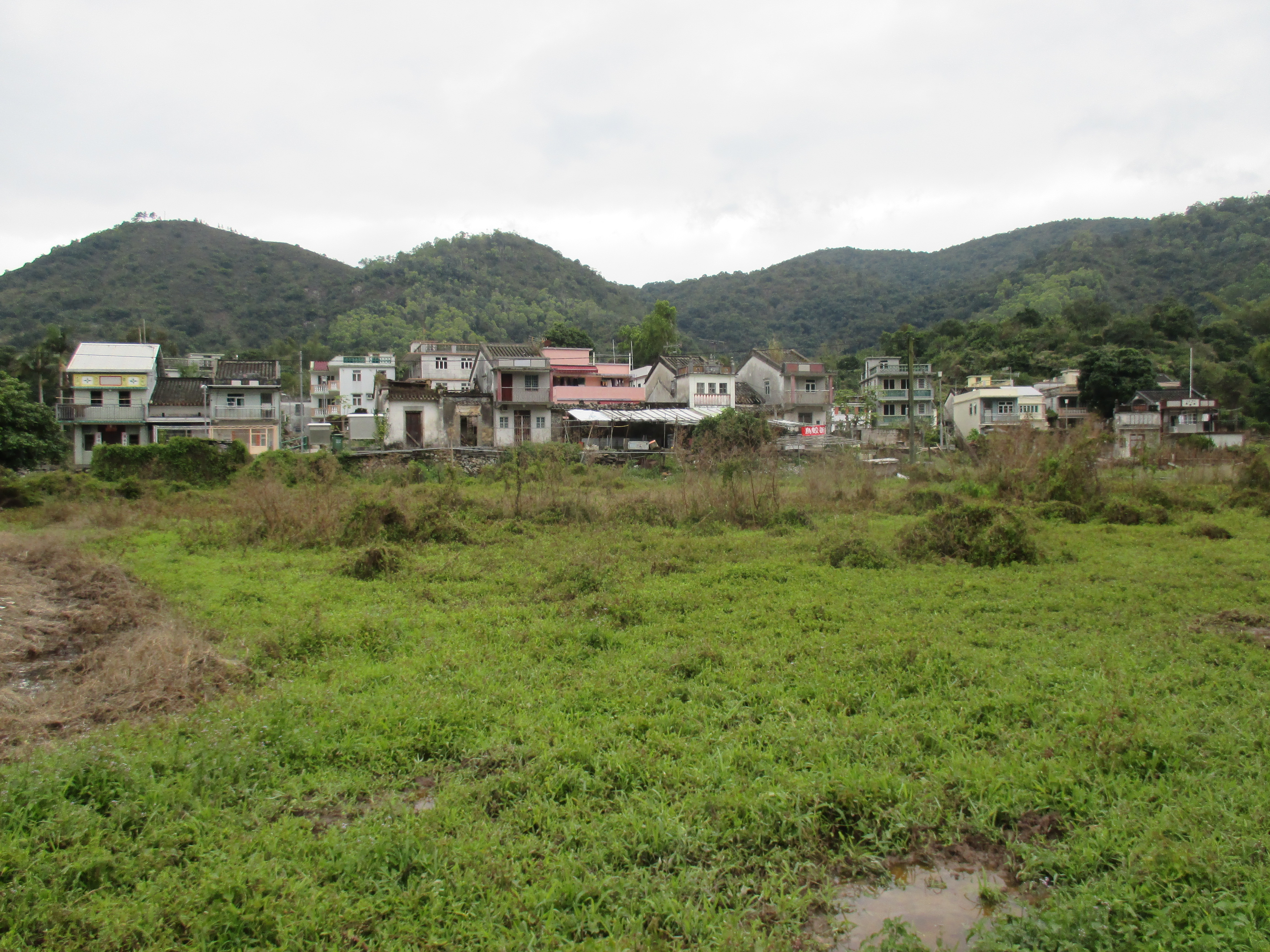
San Uk Ha (新屋家) and Leng Pui (嶺背) villages of Wu Kau Tang.

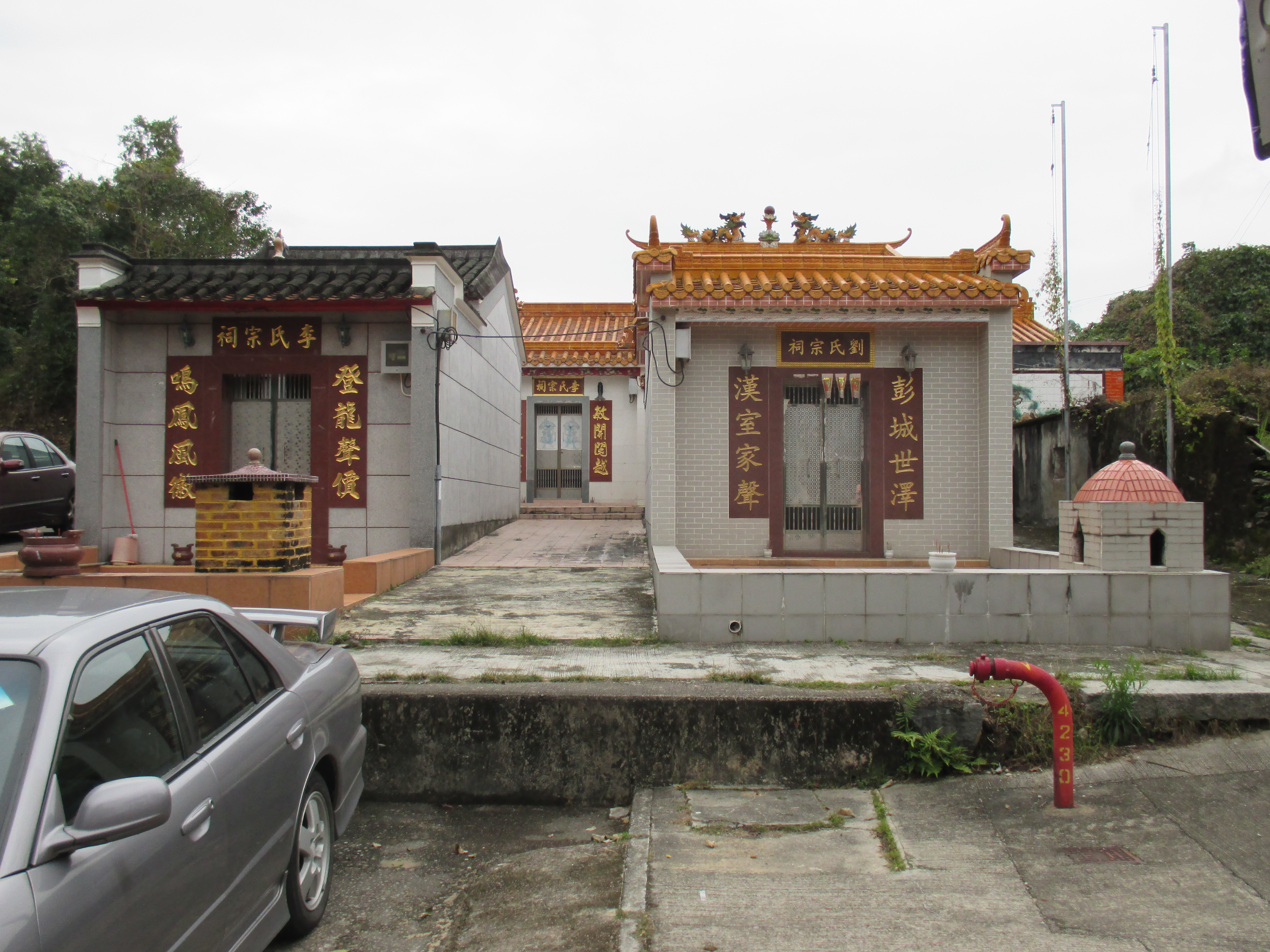
Ancestral halls at Wu Kau Tang.

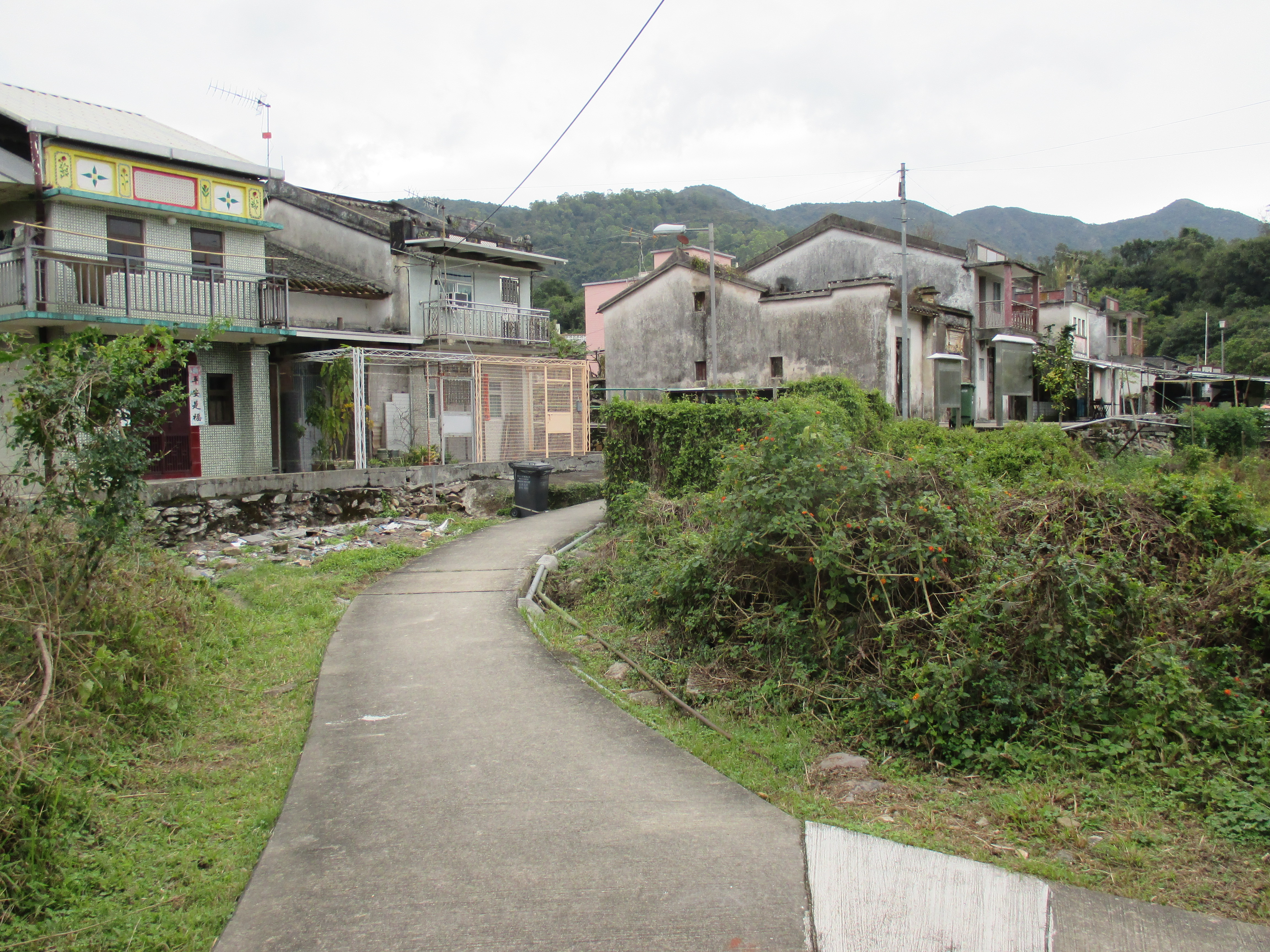
Houses in Wu Kau Tang.

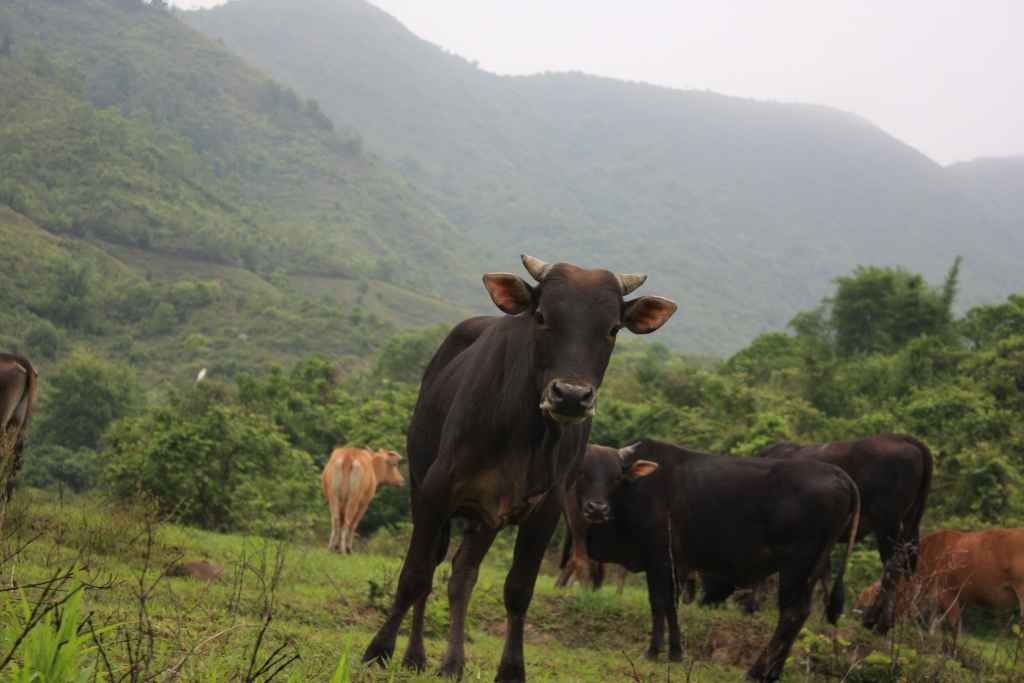
Cattle in Wu Kau Tang.

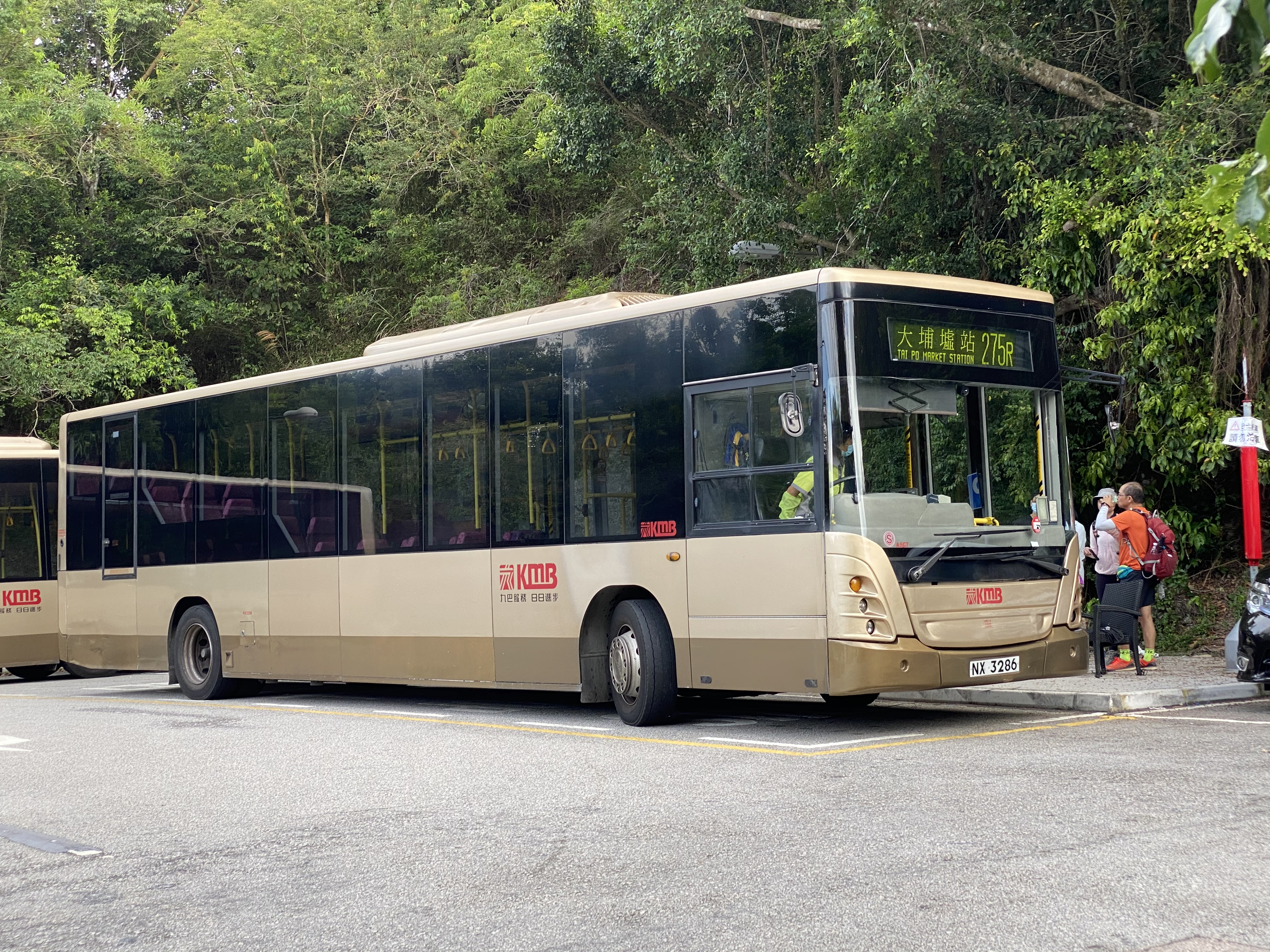
KMB bus 275R to Tai Po Market station at Wu Kau Tang.

Wu Kau Tang (Chinese: 烏蛟騰) is an area in Northeast New Territories, Hong Kong. It is administratively part of North District and is enclosed by Plover Cove Country Park on all sides. It is the starting point of the Wu Kau Tang Country Trail and the Plover Cove Reservoir Country Trail.

Originally named "Wu Kau Tin" (烏蛟田), the area includes several hamlets, including Lo Wai (老圍), Ho Pui (河背), Leng Pui (嶺背), San Uk Ha (新屋家), Tin Sum (田心) and Sam Ka Tsuen (三家村).

== Administration ==
Wu Kau Tang is a recognized village under the New Territories Small House Policy. For electoral purposes, Wu Kau Tang is part of the Sha Ta constituency of the North District Council. It is currently represented by Ko Wai-kei, who was elected in the local elections.

== History ==
In 1669, the coastal ban imposed by the Great Clearance was lifted and the Kangxi Emperor ordered the villages to return to their original sites. According to an official document, Wu Kau Tang was one of the villages which returned and was re-established.

At the time of the 1911 census, the population of Wu Kau Tang was 423. The number of males was 165.

== Geography ==
Wu Kau Tang is surrounded by several hills: Fan Kei Tok (芬箕托) to the north, Tiu Tang Lung (吊燈籠) to the northeast, Ma Tau Fung (馬頭峰) to the south and Sam Tam Lo (三担籮) to the west.

== Fauna ==
Wu Kau Tang has been described as particularly rich in butterflies, with 137 species observed. The Hong Kong paradise fish can also be found in the area.

== See also ==
- List of villages in Hong Kong
- Bride's Pool
- Kau Tam Tso
- Sham Chung
