= Bride's Pool =

Natural pool in northeast Hong Kong

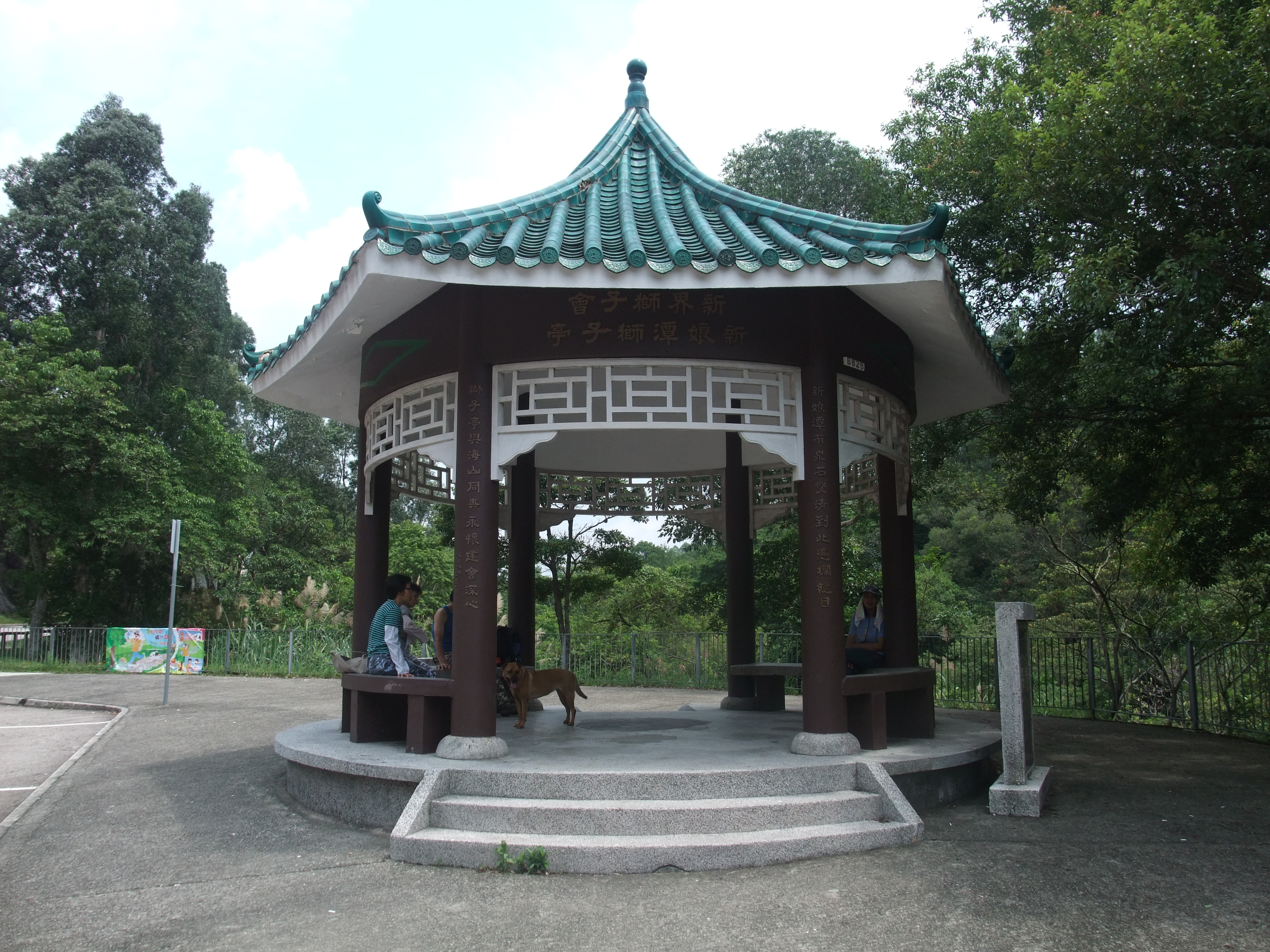
- Lions Pavilion at Bride's Pool

- Location within Hong Kong
- Location: New Territories, Hong Kong
- Coordinates: 22.50463°N 114.24090°E

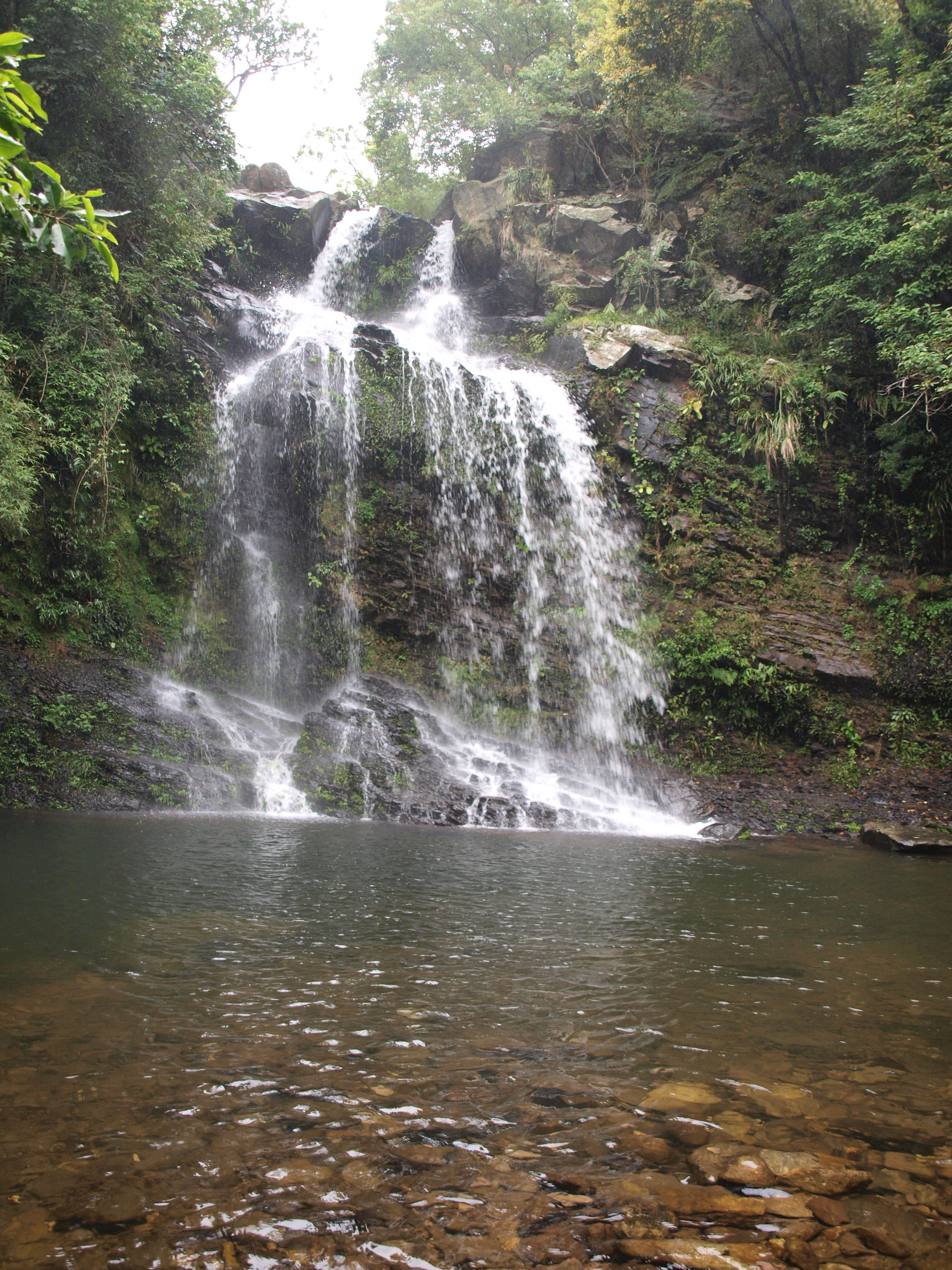
The waterfall of Bride's Pool

Bride's Pool (Chinese: 新娘潭) is a small river in the northeastern New Territories, Hong Kong near Tai Mei Tuk. The river is characterized by a string of waterfalls with plunge pools. Mirror Pool is also located nearby.

== Legend and namesake ==
Legend has it that a bride was being carried in a sedan by four porters on her way to meet her groom in stormy weather. As they passed the pool, one of the porters slipped and the bride fell into the pool and drowned. Therefore, the pool was named Bride's Pool in memory of the bride.

== Transport ==
Bride's Pool is located in the North East Region of the New Territories in Plover Cove Country Park. It can be accessed either by car or by public transport. By public transport take the MTR East Rail (formerly KCR East Rail) to Tai Po Market station and board minibus 20R. The bus will terminate at Wu Kau Tang. On Sundays and public holidays, the Kowloon Motor Bus operates the route 275R from Tai Po Market station to the Pool. The Bride's Pool Trail lies past Tai Mei Tuk and shortly before Wu Kau as the bus heads north. If the bus terminates short of the Pool at Tai Mei Tuk or minibus 20C (which also terminates at Tai Mei Tuk) is taken instead, the pool can be accessed by taxi or a 2-3 hour hike.

== See also ==
- Plover Cove Country Park
- Our Unwinding Ethos, a 2019 urban legend drama series produced by TVB
