= William Tang (fashion designer) =

Hong Kong fashion designer

William Tang Tat-chi
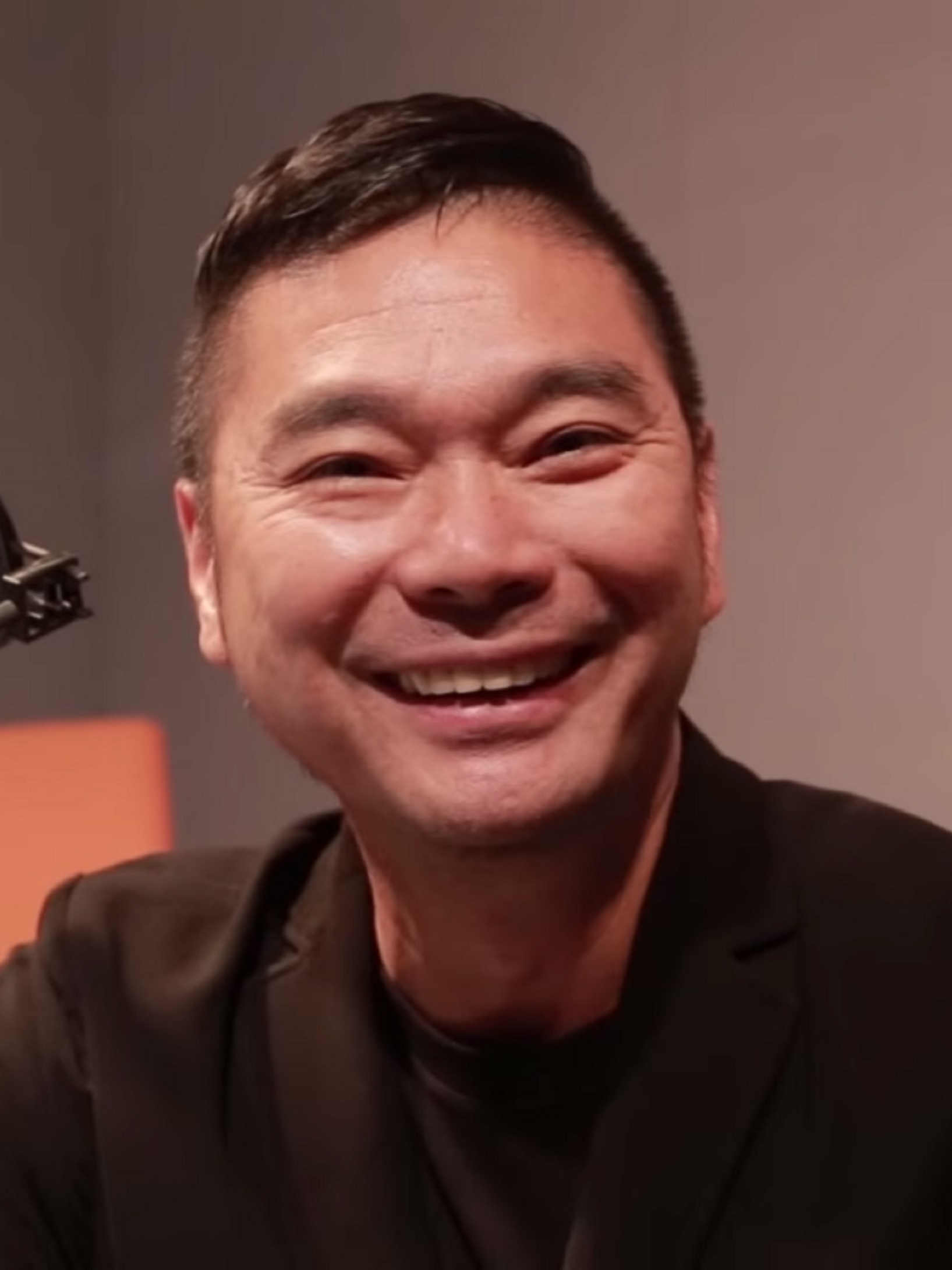
- William Tang in 2014.
- Born: April 20, 1958 (age 68); Ping Shan, Yuen Long
- Education: University of Guelph; London College of Fashion
- Spouse: Clement Chan Tsz-yan

William Tang Tat-chi (Chinese: 鄧達智; pinyin: Deng Dazhi, born 1959) is a Hong Kong fashion designer. Tang studied fashion at London College of Fashion, and established his own brand in 1985.

== Biography ==
His 1989 collection was based on a "peasant" look which came to him during a visit to China. He was well received in Hong Kong but subsequent collections in the early 1990s featuring cheongsam (qipao) failed to make an impression in Paris.

Tang also did corporate image design for Dragon Air and Hong Kong Airport. One of his works was displayed along with other Hong Kong fashion designers at the "Fashion Attitude - Hong Kong Fashion Design" exhibition in 2007.

He is a member of the Tang Clan of the New Territories.
