= House of Spirits =

House of Spirits may refer to:

- The House of the Spirits, a 1982 novel by Isabel Allende
- The House of the Spirits (film), a 1993 film based on the book by Allende
- House of Spirits (TV series), a 2016 TVB drama starring Bobby Au-yeung and Nancy Wu
