= Carat Cheung =

Canadian actress and model based in Hong Kong (born 1987)

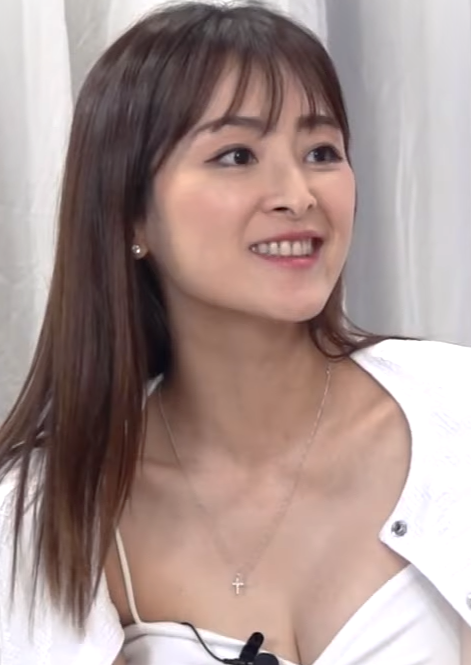
- Cheung in May 2025
- Born: 7 December 1987 (age 38); British Hong Kong
- Education: Killarney Secondary School; University of British Columbia
- Occupations: Actress; model; presenter
- Years active: 2012–present
- Spouse: Joe Choy (m. 2016)
- Children: 2 sons
- Awards: Miss Chinese (Vancouver) Pageant; 2009 1st Runner-Up; Miss Hong Kong; 2012 Winner; Miss Chinese International Pageant; 2013 2nd Runner-Up

Chinese name
- Traditional Chinese: 張名雅
- Simplified Chinese: 张名雅
Transcriptions
Standard Mandarin
- Hanyu Pinyin: Zhāng Míng Yǎ
Yue: Cantonese
- Jyutping: Zoeng1 Meng4 Aa1
- Musical career
- Origin: Hong Kong
- Label: TVB
- Website: TVB artiste page

Carat Cheung Ming-nga (Chinese: 張名雅; born 7 December 1987) is a Canadian actress, model and former beauty pageant winner currently based in Hong Kong and previously under Television Broadcasts Limited (TVB) management. She is the winner of Miss Hong Kong 2012.

== Biography ==
Carat Cheung Ming-nga hails from Vancouver, British Columbia. She attended Killarney Secondary School and graduated from University of British Columbia majoring in Economics Business Studies. Cheung is also the niece of TVB television drama producer Alfred Cheung Kin-ting. Prior to returning to Hong Kong, Cheung worked as a presenter for Fairchild TV, a Chinese television channel in Canada.

== Pageant career ==
Cheung placed as 1st Runner-Up in the 2009 Miss Chinese (Vancouver) Pageant, with Eliza Sam winning the event.

In 2012, Cheung returned to Hong Kong in order to participate in the 2012 Miss Hong Kong pageant for a better chance of aspiration to enter into acting. 2012 was the first Miss Hong Kong pageant to hold viewers choice online voting. The winner was to be selected based on popular online votes by audiences. Cheung was crowned the winner on August 26, 2012. However, her win remained highly controversial as TVB's computer servers were disrupted, resulting in a lot of viewers unable to vote for their favourite. At the end, the winner was decided by the judging panel. Netizens and a few TVB artistes were not happy with the final winner result and demanded TVB do a recount to be fair for all the other contestants. Cheung's uncle, Alfred Cheung, came to her defense noting all past winners were decided by the judges so the rightful winner was crowned.

After winning the 2012 Miss Hong Kong title, Cheung went on to participate in the Miss Chinese International Pageant 2013, where she finished as 2nd Runner-Up.

== Acting career ==
Cheung's acting debuted in 2014 with a minor role in TVB drama Tomorrow Is Another Day. The following year, she was cast in supporting roles in dramas Smooth Talker, Wudang Rules and the highly rated Ghost of Relativity which brought her more public attention.

On 7 February 2022, Cheung announced on Instagram that her contract with TVB had ended.

== Personal life ==
On July 31, 2016, Cheung announced on her social media account that she was engaged to her boyfriend Joe Choy. They held their wedding ceremony at the Intercontinental Hotel in Hong Kong on September 9, 2016.

== Filmography ==
=== Television dramas ===
Year	Title	Chinese Title	Role	Notes
2014	Tomorrow Is Another Day	再戰明天	Kelly	
2015	Smooth Talker	以和為貴	Betty So Fa-yi (蘇花兒)	
2015	Wudang Rules	潮拜武當	Diana Dai On-na (戴安娜)	
2015	Ghost of Relativity	鬼同你OT	Anna (狄安娜)	
2016	House of Spirits	一屋老友記	Joanne Chin Cho-kwan (錢祖君)	
2016	Daddy Dearest	超能老豆	Mak Ka-ka (麥家嘉)	
2016	A Fist Within Four Walls	城寨英雄	Wu Nei (胡妮)	
2017	Provocateur	與諜同謀	Apple (戴如寶)	

Preceded by Rebecca Zhu 朱晨麗	Miss Hong Kong Pageant Winner; 2012	Succeeded by Grace Chan 陳凱琳
