= Ghost of Relativity =

Hong Kong drama television series

- Official poster
- Also known as: Ghost to Overtime With You; Who The Hell Wants to Overtime With You
- 鬼同你OT
- Genre: Modern Drama, Comedy, Romance, Supernatural
- Created by: Hong Kong Television Broadcasts Limited
- Written by: Cheung Sai-coeng
- Directed by: Ng Koon-yue
- Starring: Moses Chan; Kristal Tin; Nancy Wu; Eddie Kwan; Pierre Ngo; Vivien Yeo; Ram Chiang; Mimi Chu; Wai Lee; Celine Ma; C-Kwan; Anthony Ho; Alan Wan; Zoie Tam; Lee Yee-man; Carat Cheung
- Theme music composer: Damon Chui
- Opening theme: Sunrise (天光) by C AllStar
- Country of origin: Hong Kong
- Original languages: Cantonese; Mandarin
- No. of episodes: 28

Production
- Executive producer: Catherine Tsang
- Producer: Steven Tsui
- Production location: Hong Kong
- Editor: Yung Sin-ying
- Camera setup: Multi camera
- Running time: 45 minutes
- Production company: TVB

Original release
- Network: TVB Jade, HD Jade
- Release: 13 July – 9 August 2015

Related
- The Empress of China; The Fixer; My Lover from the Planet Meow (2016)

Ghost of Relativity
- Chinese: 鬼同你OT
- Literal meaning: "Ghost to Overtime With You" "Who The Hell Wants to Overtime With You"
Transcriptions
Standard Mandarin
- Hanyu Pinyin: Guǐ Tóng Nǐ OT
Yue: Cantonese
- Yale Romanization: Gwái Tùhng Néih OT
- Jyutping: Gwai2 Tung4 Nei5 OT

Ghost of Relativity (Chinese: 鬼同你OT; Jyutping: Gwai2 Tung4 Nei5 OT; Cantonese Yale: Gwái Tùhng Néih OT; literally "Ghost to Overtime With You" or "Who The Hell Wants to Overtime With You") is a 2015 Hong Kong romantic-comedy with a supernatural theme television drama created and produced by TVB, starring Moses Chan, Kristal Tin and Nancy Wu as the main cast. The Chinese title has a double meaning, when read accordingly it literally translates to "Ghost to Overtime With You", however the word "ghost" (鬼) is also a Hong Kong slang that is equivalent to "who the hell" in English, so the Chinese title could also translate as "Who The Hell Wants to Overtime With You". Filming took place from October 2014 till February 2015. The drama is broadcast on Hong Kong's Jade and HD Jade channels from July 13 till August 9, 2015 every Monday through Sunday during its 9:30-10:30 pm timeslot with a total of 28 episodes.

== Synopsis ==
May Suen Suk-Mui (Kristal Tin) is an absent-minded, dim-witted, unambitious thirty-something year old, who gets lucky during her job interview as a receptionist at GSZ Architects Limited. The human resources manager Ma Mei-ching, had unconsidered her for the position after seeing she was late to the interview and had unimpressive work experience. However office manager Gin Keung Yung (Nancy Wu) comes to May's defense when the human resource manager loudly mocks May in front of others. Gin points out the flaws of the other applicants and deems them unpresentable for the receptionist job. With Gin's comments about the other applicants, May is hired on the spot against the human resource manager's wishes.

GSZ Architects Limited's office manager Gin is feared and respected by all at the office. She has been in love with architect Michael Mai Hoi-long (Moses Chan) for many years, and she drops hints about her feelings for him, hoping he will know how she feels, but Michael is too involved in his work to notice Gin and only thinks of her as an extra-supportive co-worker. Gin has patiently waited and supported Michael for many years hoping when he receives the recognition he desperately seeks for his designs, he will put his work behind him and finally notice her.

May gets fired on her first day at work when she is blamed for Michael losing a design award. However, due to her stupidity earlier in the day, while comparing her counterfeit designer handbag to Gin's almost identical authentic designer handbag, she confusedly switches their handbags and is forced to return to the office later that night to return Gin's handbag. While talking on the phone with Gin to obtain the office tower's entry pin number, Gin gets electrocuted to death on May's dangerously high voltage counterfeit cellphone.

One year later May is chased by debt collectors for a loan she got for her con-artist boyfriend Wong Tai-lung. When the police calls her to collect her handbag that was previously in Gin's possession, she desperately uses the counterfeit cellphone that killed Gin to try to call authorities when the debt collectors trap her. Upon opening and recharging the counterfeit cellphone Gin's spirit comes alive. May unnoticeably brings home the counterfeit cellphone knowing that she had seen Gin's ghost. She slowly figures out that the counterfeit cellphone is somehow connected to Gin's spirit coming alive. May's curiosity gets the better of her and she decides to recharge the counterfeit cellphone again just to see if Gin will come out again. After May finds out that she is the only one that can see or hear Gin and that Gin cannot venture far away from the counterfeit cellphone, Gin uses May's responsibility for her death to have her take her to GSZ Architects Limited's office because she wants to see Michael. Upset by the new supposed women in Michael's life and after seeing Michael's heartfelt message to her, Gin uses May to communicate with Michael and her loved ones.

In order to still be by Michael's side, help him through his project and keep at bay the sexy new director Lolita who is tasked with seducing Michael, Gin helps May get a job as the new office manager at GSZ. She coaches May to speak with confidence and provides her knowledge of the architect firm. Michael refuses to hire May at first but takes a chance on her when she reminds him of Gin. May who was only interested in the attractive salary of the position at first begins to take her work seriously when she gets to know Michael better and learns how important his current project is to him. Gin who finds herself able to enter May's body uses this advantage to physically connect with Michael. However, because of this physical contact between May and Michael the two start to develop feelings for each other. But Gin's hard work to build up May's reputation at GZS is soon threatened when May's con-artist ex-boyfriend Wong Tai-lung gets a job at GSZ and has ulterior motives.

May's ex-boyfriend working at GSZ is the least of her problems. She does her best to withhold her growing feelings for Michael since she knows how much Gin loves Michael and doesn't want to offend her. Michael who is in love with May does not make it any easier for her when he finds excuses everyday to have her work overtime at the office with him. Also with rumors of the office being haunted, May is worried that Gin's ghost has been discovered. In order to pay off their debts, head of marketing's Charlie and head of human resource's Lai Hei-wo has been stealing and selling blueprints illegally. They let everyone believe the office is haunted so the office will be empty after work hours. Wong Tai-lung discovers Charlie and Hei-wo's deception and blackmails them for a cut of the profit. Hugo who also discovers Charlie and Hei-wo's deception, with the help of IT specialize Ngai Tit-man bands together with Charlie and Hei-wo to oust Tai-lung out of GSZ in order for Hugo to get the biggest cut of the profits.

Gin discovers Michael's feelings for May and turns against May by telling her that she is a slut who seduced Michael since Michael would never fall in love with a woman like her. Gin also reminds May what a loser she used to be, and that all the expensive clothes, handbags, luxury apartment and high level job she has now was all given to her by Gin. With Gin's hurtful words, May gets easily persuaded by Hugo to have her hand over Michael's designs to him. Tai-lung uses pictures of when he and May were together to extort money from her. Once she pays him to retain the pictures he also tells her of Charlie and Hei-wo's deception. May finds out Hugo is also in on the deception and tries to save Michael's career by deleting the stolen designs from Hugo's computer, but May gets electrocuted into a coma in the process. Hugo tries to frame May on his devious plans but Ngai Tit-man. who doesn't want to be part of Hugo's deception anymore tells the truth to the authorities.

With the help of Tit-man, May's family and co-workers, they try to find her spirit that has been electrically wandering around Hong Kong. Gin finally sees how much May means to Michael and starts to let go of her feelings for him. When they find May's spirit she doesn't remember who she is, with Gin's words and the appearance of Michael she regains her memory, but then Michael gets into a near-death accident and both Gin and May must use their spiritual powers to save him. May, who earlier used her spiritual powers, cannot return to her body; Gin helps her and gives her blessing to May and Michael before disappearing into thin air.

Five years later Hugo and Charlie are serving prison sentences with Wong Tai-lung as their jail cell boss. Lai Hei-wo, who just got released from prison, is the new office assistant at GSZ. Ma Mei-ching is the new head of human resources. Charlie's three Angels co-manage the marketing department. Lolita and Ngai Tit-man are a couple who are in a serious relationship. May is head management, calling the shots at GSZ. Michael's design is finally constructed and he gets the award that he has sought after for many years. Michael and May are also a happily married couple with a daughter. As the three prepare to go to bed it's revealed that their daughter is the reincarnation of Gin.

== Cast ==
=== Main cast ===
- Moses Chan as Michael Mai Hoi-long (米開朗; Chinese name is the short form translation of Italian Renaissance artist Michelangelo)

An architect at GSZ Architects Limited who constantly enters architectural competitions every year because he desperately seeks recognition for his designs. He is highly against his designs becoming commercial shopping or residential high rise buildings, so against it that he doesn't want his name on it and is okay when his boss Hugo takes credit for his designs. He is mild mannered and had relied on Gin for every little thing since he is heavily involved in his work. While working closely with May he starts to fall in love with her and tries to find excuses to take her out to dinner, he also shows his jealousy when May is in the presence with Hugo alone. He and May get married at the end and have a daughter together.

- Kristal Tin as May Suen Suk-Mui (孫淑梅; homophone to "sour, rancid, moldy 酸餿霉")

The new and former receptionist at GSZ Architects Limited. She is fired on her first day at work due to her storming and outburst in a conference call meeting where main architect Michael was to receive a design award. Her stupidity when switching handbags with Gin causes Gin to use her counterfeit cellphone and die. Later when she re-uses her counterfeit cellphone she is the only person that can see, hear and communicate with Gin. She has a con-artist boyfriend, who coached her into borrowing HKD$80,000 for him. This later causes debt collectors to constantly hound her for repayment. She becomes the new office manager at GSZ with the help of Gin. While working closely with Michael she develops feelings for him but knowing how much Gin loves him she withholds her feelings for him and avoids him when he tries to find excuses for her to work overtime at the office with him or have dinner together. She and Michael get married at the end and have a daughter together.

- Nancy Wu as Gin Keung Yung (姜蓉; homophone to "minced ginger 薑蓉")

The office manager at GSZ Architects Limited. She has been patiently waiting and mentally supporting Michael for many years since she is in love with him. Due to May's stupidity when confusedly switching their almost identical handbags she is forced to answer a call on May's counterfeit cellphone and dies. After dying she finds out that a lot of her former colleagues really hated her except the design team which her younger brother and Michael are a part of. Still caring about Michael after death she uses May who is the only one that can see and communicate with her to work at GSZ to keep close tabs on Michael. When she notices Michael's feelings for May she becomes insanely jealous and turns against May as she doesn't understand why Michael would love a nobody like May. After realizing how much May means to Michael she finally lets go of her feelings for him. She disappears and gets reincarnated as May and Michael's daughter.

=== GSZ Architects Limited staff ===
==== Senior management ====
- Eddie Kwan as Hugo Lee Ngong-lap (李昂立; Chinese name is the short form translation of Italian Renaissance artist Leonardo da Vinci)

General manager of GSZ Architects Limited and Michael's university schoolmate. He has an excuse and answer for everything. He takes credit for Michael's designs that turn into commercial buildings. He only cares about profits and is willing to sell GSZ's designs and blueprints illegally as long as there is money to be made. Ngai Tit-man confesses to authorities of his devious plans and he is sent to prison.

- Vivien Yeo as Lolita Law Lai-fa (羅麗花)

The new director at the architect firm. She is a former pageant queen who is a known gold digger. Hired by Hugo in order to sway and influence Michael. When Michael pays no attention to her seduction she becomes more competitive in being able to seduce him. After one last attempt to seduce Michael by pretending to commit suicide she is sent away by Hugo. She comes back to GSZ and starts dating Ngai Tit-man because she likes nerdy men.

==== Design team ====
- Anthony Ho as Keung Chung (姜聰; homophone to "ginger and scallion 薑蔥")

Gin's younger brother. He works at GSZ Architects Limited as an engineer under Michael's design team. People at work calls him "Fat boy Chung" because he likes to eat and is quite overweight. Angie from Charlie's marketing department pretends to like him to get him to accept an undesirable design account to redesign the interior of a columbarium. He finally becomes a certified architect and is dating Angie at the end.

- C-Kwan as Momo Lai A-mo (賴亞武; homophone to "toad/frog 癩蝦蟆")

An engineer who works under Michael's design team. Annie from Charlie's marketing department pretends to like him to get him to accept an undesirable design account with a sauna spa. He lives with Keung Chung and Manhattan at Chung's father Bing-yan's home. He finally becomes a certified architect and is dating Annie at the end.

- Alan Wan as Manhattan Man Hak-dun (萬克敦; homophone to "Manhattan 曼哈頓")

An engineer who works under Michael's design team. Anna from Charlie's marketing department pretends to like him to get him to accept an undesirable design account at a Mahjong parlor. He was raised abroad so he doesn't understand much Hong Kong culture. He lives together with Chung and Ngo-mo at Chung's father Bing-yan's home. He finally becomes a certified architect and is dating Anna at the end.

==== Marketing team ====
- Pierre Ngo as Charlie Chan Cha-lei (陳查理; character's name is in reference to "Charlie" from the classic American TV series Charlie's Angels)

Head of the marketing department. He is flirtatious and likes to flirt with all the female staff except human resource manager Ma May-zing. He does not respect the design team because from his point of view his marketing team does all the hard work to generate money for the firm while the design team sits around and does nothing. Due to his extravagant lifestyle he has his three Angels trick the design team into taking illegal renovation accounts. He later incurs debt after losing to Lolita's uncle at a game of cards. Together with the head of HR Lai Hei-wo, they resort to stealing GZS's blueprints to sell to outsiders in order to pay off their debt, however the new security guard Wong Dai-lung has surveillance evidence of their crime and blackmails them to get a cut of their profits. He is sent to prison when Ngai Tit-man confesses to authorities about the devious plans he was part of.

- Zoie Tam as Annie

She works in the marketing department and is known as one of Charlie's three angels in the office. She pretends to like Lai Nga-mo in order for him to accept an interior account to redesign a sauna spa that also offers sexual services. She later co-manages the marketing department with Angie and Anna. She also dates Lai Nga-mo for real in the end.

- Lee Yee-man as Angie

She works in the marketing department and is known as one of Charlie's three angels in the office. She pretends to like Keung Chung in order for him to accept an interior account to redesign an urban columbarium. She later co-manages the marketing department with Annie and Anna. She also dates Keung Chung for real in the end.

- Carat Cheung as Anna

She works in the marketing department and is known as one of Charlie's three angels in the office. She pretends to like Manhattan so that he would accept an interior account to redesign a mahjong parlor operated by triads. She later co-manages the marketing department with Annie and Angie. She also dates Manhattan for real in the end.

- Kelvin Lee as George
- Even Chan as Christine
- Samuel Chan as Kelvin
- Kiko Leung as Candy

==== Human resources ====
- Kong Wing Fai as Lai Hei-wo (黎希和; Name in reverse is homophone to the slang "和稀泥" which means to "blur the line between right and wrong")

Head of the human resource department and Ma May-zing's supervisor. He doesn't like extra work and complaints, it make him feel annoyance and bothered. He later incurs debt after losing to Lolita's uncle at a game of cards, resulting to loan sharks looking for him at work. Together with Head of Marketing's Charlie, they resort to stealing GZS's blueprints to sell to outsiders in order to pay off their debt; however, the new security guard Wong Dai-lung has surveillance evidence of their crime and blackmails them to get a cut of their profits. He gets released from prison earlier then Hugo and Charlie. He then becomes the new office assistant at GSZ.

- Celine Ma as Ma Mei-ching (馬美貞)

Human resource manager who was highly against hiring May. She also hawks cosmetic products from her desk at work and even has a credit card swiping machine. She becomes the new head of human resource at the end of the series.

- Mikako Leung as Jenny
- Kate Tsang as Katie
- Helen Seng as Wing
- Terrence Wong as Simon
- Kelvin Yuen as Frankie
- Kayley Chung as Gigi

==== Other staff ====
- Ram Chiang as Ngai Tit-man (艾鐵文; homophone to IT Man)

IT specialist hired by Hugo to find out who is causing trouble at GSZ, making all the employees think the office is haunted. He later stays on at GSZ to further privately monitor all the employees' computer activities. He uncovers Gin's ghost at GSZ due a strange email Gin wrote and sent to Michael. He is the real culprit who caused Gin's death when he over-surged GSZ's computer system while trying to hack into the design teams computers a year ago. He speaks in tech terms only. Lolita becomes his girlfriend at the end because she likes nerdy men.

- Raymond Chiu as Wong Tai-lung (王大龍)

Nickname Raptor (速龍), May's former boyfriend who uses and coaches her into lying about her occupation in order to obtain a bank loan. A con artist who sweet talks females into lending him money and then disappearing on them. He reappears later as a taxi driver that May unknowing flags to take a drunk Michael home. When he hears the amount of money on the project May and Michael is working on he develops ulterior motives. After GSZ's elder security guard Chan Chut is fired, he uses May as reference to get hired as the new security guard at GSZ. He is later fired from his security guard position at GSZ when he blackmails Charlie and Lai Hei-wo's for a cut of their profit in stealing and selling GSZ's blueprints only to have them both turn against him with the help of Hugo. He later cooperate with Hong Wai to scheme people. After Hong Wai and him turn against each other, he is later sent to prison and becomes Hugo and Charlie's cell boss.

- Dick Chan as Chan Chat (陳七)

An elder security guard. He falls asleep with his eyes opened while at work due to watching too much television late at night at home. He is later fired for being too gossipy, since he spread Charlie's unfortunate financial situation. After being fired, he comes back to the GSZ office to make a scene. His position is replaced by May's ex-boyfriend Wong Dai-lung.

- Nicole Wan as Jessica

The current receptionist at GSZ. She is often heavily engrossed in watching dramas while at work which makes her not notice if anyone enters the offices.

- Bobo Yeung as Cathy

Hugo's personal secretary.

- Hiroki Hong as Bevis
- Osanna Chiu as Helen
- Katie Ng as Cora

=== Extended cast ===
- Mimi Chu as Suen Choi Sau-yuk (孫蔡秀玉; homophone to "sour vegetables and pork 酸菜瘦肉")

May's mother. She makes a living as a con fortune teller and taoist. Gin's father, younger brother and the rest of the design team mistakes her to be May when May was pretending to a psychic who could contact Gin. She uses this advantage to con them out of money by giving them bogus psychic readings. After Hong Wai true intentions are revealed she and Bing-yan become a couple.

- Wai Lee as Brian Keung Bing-yan (姜炳仁; homophone to "gingerbread man 薑餅人")

Gin and Keung Chung's father. He is also the cellphone store owner who recommended May a higher power cellphone battery and faster phone charger for her counterfeit cellphone which killed his daughter. After Gin's death his cell phone shop goes out of business and he mooches off of Michael for a monthly allowance of HKD$40,000. He also tries to sell Gin's apartment but becomes afraid when he thinks Gin is haunting it. He meets con-artist Hong Wai at the badminton center. After charming him she become his new care person at his home. When she learns he is a cheapskate she partner with Tai-lung to blackmail money from him. He begs for Suen Choi Sau-yuk's forgiveness after seeing Hong Wei's true intentions. He and Suen Choi Sau-yuk become a couple at the end,

- Maggie Yu as Hong Wai (康為: homophone to "bra 胸圍")

Keung Bing-yan's badminton Instructor. She is from mainland China and speaks with an accent. She claims to be part of the national badminton team. She uses her youth and body to seduce Bing-yan into paying HKD$500 per hour for badminton lessons with her. She is really a con-artist who uses her youth and flirtation to con older men. She later cooperates with Wong Dai-lung to try to blackmail Bing-yan. After blackmailing May together she and Wong Tai-lung have a fight on who gets the money. She later is reformed and becomes a street cleaner.

- Joe Junior as Bui Yat-ming (貝一鳴; homophone to Chinese-born American architect I. M. Pei's Chinese name 貝聿銘)

The head judge of the Bernini International Prize for Architecture.

- Akai Lee as Debt collector (收數佬)

One of the debt collectors after May for the repayment of the bank loan she took out for Wong Dai-lung.

- Chan Min-leung as Debt collector (收數佬)

One of the debt collectors after May for the repayment of the bank loan she took out for Wong Dai-lung.

- Ricky Wong as Brother Bubble (Bubble哥)

Owner of the sauna spa that also offers sexual services. Lai Nga-mo is tricked by Annie into accepting his account to redesign his spa with additional spa pools. When Ngo-mo tries to refuse the job because the structure of the building is too old to make changes, he ups the sauna heat until Ngo-mo faints.

- Steve Lee as Brother Chau Shui (抽水哥)

A triad boss who owns the mahjong parlor that Anna tricks Manhattan into accepting his interior redesign account. He wants to add additional mahjong tables to his already crowded establishment. When Manhattan tries to refuse his job he uses Manhattan novice skills in playing mahjong as a gambling debt.

- Chan Wing Chun as Gwai Wong Cheong (鬼王昌)

Owner of the columbarium that Angie tricked Keung Chung into accepting an interior redesign account. He wants to add additional niches to the already crowded columbarium. When Chung tries to refuse the job he scares Chung by telling him, the spirits of the dead people in the columbarium will haunt him.

- Choi Kwok-Hing as Chin Tai-kwan (錢大軍)

Lolita's uncle and a major investor at GSZ. He makes his money by cheating at poker with the help of his two assistants. He gets arrested when he is caught on surveillance cameras trying to cheat at a Las Vegas casino.

- Jim Tang as Ah Kun (阿權)

Chin Dai-gwan's assistant who helps him cheat at poker with their cellphones.

- Calvin Chan as Ah Lap (阿立)

Chin Dai-gwan's assistant who helps him cheat at poker with their cellphones.

- Ngai Wai Man as Mr. Lau (劉生)

Couple interested in buying Gin's apartment. Mrs. Lau's husband.

- Fanny Lee as Mrs. Lau (劉太)

Couple interested in buying Gin's apartment. Mr. Lau's wife.

- Derek Wong as Mr. Lau #2 (劉先生)

Couple #2 interested in buying Gin's apartment. Ms. Wong's boyfriend.

- Ice Chow as Ms. Wong (黃小姐)

Couple #2 interested in buying Gin's apartment. Mr. Lau #2's girlfriend.

- Barry Cox as Ko Fat-ou (高法奧)

US casino boss.

== Development ==
TVB 2015 calendar, December. From left to right: Kristal Tin, Moses Chan, Nancy Wu.

- Ada Choi was originally cast in Kristal Tin's role. Eager to work with producer Steven Tsui again, Choi turned down three mainland China dramas. After reading the script, she backed out of the drama due to religious beliefs.
- The costume fitting ceremony was held on October 31, 2014 at 12:30 pm Tseung Kwan O TVB City Studio One.
- The blessing ceremony took place on December 8, 2014 at 3:00 pm Tseung Kwan O TVB City Studio Twelve.
- Filming took place from October 2014 to February 2015, entirely on location in Hong Kong.
- During filming both lead actresses, Tin and Wu suffered from the flu due to the cold weather and close proximity of each other.
- A promo image of Ghost of Relativity was featured in TVB's 2015 calendar for the month of December.

== Viewership ratings ==
Timeslot (HKT)	#	Day(s)	Week	Episode(s)	Average points	Peaking points
Mon - Sun (9:30-10:30 pm); 21:30–22:30	1	Mon - Fri	13–19 July 2015	1 — 5	26	28
Mon - Sun (9:30-10:30 pm); 21:30–22:30	1	Sat	20 July 2015	6	20	--
Mon - Sun (9:30-10:30 pm); 21:30–22:30	1	Sun	21 July 2015	7	24	--
Mon - Sun (9:30-10:30 pm); 21:30–22:30	2	Mon - Fri	20–24 July 2015	8 — 12	27	29
Mon - Sun (9:30-10:30 pm); 21:30–22:30	2	Sat	25 July 2015	13	22	--
Mon - Sun (9:30-10:30 pm); 21:30–22:30	2	Sun	26 July 2015	14	26	--
Mon - Sun (9:30-10:30 pm); 21:30–22:30	3	Mon - Fri	27 – 31 July 2015	15 — 19	28	29
Mon - Sun (9:30-10:30 pm); 21:30–22:30	3	Sun	02 Aug 2015	20	25	--
Mon - Sun (9:30-10:30 pm); 21:30–22:30	4	Mon - Fri	03–07 Aug 2015	21 — 25	28	30
Mon - Sun (9:30-10:30 pm); 21:30–22:30	4	Sat	08 Aug 2015	26	24	--
Mon - Sun (9:30-10:30 pm); 21:30–22:30	4	Sun	09 Aug 2015	27	30	33
Total average					27	34

== International broadcast ==
Network	Country	Airing Date	Timeslot
Astro On Demand	Malaysia	July 13, 2015	Monday – Sunday 9:30 – 10:15 pm
8TV	Malaysia	June 23, 2017	Monday – Friday 7:00 – 8:00 pm
TVBJ	Australia	July 14, 2015	Monday – Sunday 12:30 – 1:30 am
Starhub TV	Singapore	October 26, 2015	Monday – Sunday 9:00 – 10:00 pm
Mediacorp Channel U	Singapore	July 7, 2017	Monday – Friday 10:00 – 11:00, Saturday and Sunday 5:00 – 7:00

== Awards and nominations ==
Year	Ceremony	Category	Nominee	Result
2015	StarHub TVB Awards	My Favourite TVB Drama	Ghost of Relativity	Nominated
2015	StarHub TVB Awards	My Favourite TVB Actress	Kristal Tin	Nominated
2015	StarHub TVB Awards	My Favourite TVB Actress	Nancy Wu	Nominated
2015	StarHub TVB Awards	My Favourite TVB Supporting Actor	Eddie Kwan	Nominated
2015	StarHub TVB Awards	My Favourite TVB Female TV Character	Kristal Tin	Won
2015	StarHub TVB Awards	My Favourite TVB Female TV Character	Nancy Wu	Won
2015	StarHub TVB Awards	My Favourite Onscreen Couple	Moses Chan & Kristal Tin	Nominated
2015	StarHub TVB Awards	My Favourite TVB Theme Song	Sunrise (天光) by C AllStar	Nominated
2015	TVB Star Awards Malaysia	My Favourite TVB Drama Series	Ghost Of Relativity	Nominated
2015	TVB Star Awards Malaysia	My Favourite TVB Actor in a Leading Role	Moses Chan	Nominated
2015	TVB Star Awards Malaysia	My Favourite TVB Actress in a Leading Role	Kristal Tin	Won
2015	TVB Star Awards Malaysia	My Favourite TVB Actress in a Leading Role	Nancy Wu	Won
2015	TVB Star Awards Malaysia	My Favourite TVB Actor in a Supporting Role	Pierre Ngo	Nominated
2015	TVB Star Awards Malaysia	My Favourite TVB Actress in a Supporting Role	Vivien Yeo	Nominated
2015	TVB Star Awards Malaysia	My Favourite TVB On-Screen Couple	Moses Chan & Kristal Tin	Nominated
2015	TVB Star Awards Malaysia	My Favourite Top 16 TVB Drama Characters	Kristal Tin	Won
2015	TVB Star Awards Malaysia	My Favourite Top 16 TVB Drama Characters	Nancy Wu	Won
2015	TVB Anniversary Awards	TVB Anniversary Award for Best Drama	Ghost Of Relativity	Nominated
2015	TVB Anniversary Awards	TVB Anniversary Award for Best Actor	Moses Chan	Nominated
2015	TVB Anniversary Awards	TVB Anniversary Award for Best Actress	Kristal Tin	Nominated
2015	TVB Anniversary Awards	TVB Anniversary Award for Best Actress	Nancy Wu	Won
2015	TVB Anniversary Awards	TVB Anniversary Award for Best Supporting Actor	Eddie Kwan	Nominated
2015	TVB Anniversary Awards	TVB Anniversary Award for Best Supporting Actor	Pierre Ngo	Nominated
2015	TVB Anniversary Awards	TVB Anniversary Award for Best Supporting Actress	Mimi Chu	Nominated
2015	TVB Anniversary Awards	TVB Anniversary Award for Best Supporting Actress	Celine Ma	Nominated
2015	TVB Anniversary Awards	TVB Anniversary Award for Best Supporting Actress	Vivien Yeo	Nominated
2015	TVB Anniversary Awards	TVB Anniversary Award for Most Popular Male Character	Moses Chan	Nominated
2015	TVB Anniversary Awards	TVB Anniversary Award for Most Popular Female Character	Kristal Tin	Won
2015	TVB Anniversary Awards	TVB Anniversary Award for Most Popular Female Character	Nancy Wu	Nominated
2015	TVB Anniversary Awards	TVB Anniversary Award for Most Popular Female Character	Vivien Yeo	Nominated
2015	TVB Anniversary Awards	TVB Anniversary Award for Favourite Drama Song	Sunrise (天光) by C AllStar	Nominated
