= Sinister Beings =

- 逆天奇案
- Genre: Crime, thriller
- Created by: Lau Kar-ho
- Written by: Sum Kwok-wing; Suen Ho-ho
- Starring: Ruco Chan; Ben Wong; Rosina Lam; Crystal Fung; Joman Chiang; Jonathan Cheung; Moon Lau
- Opening theme: Adversity (逆襲) by Hubert Wu
- Ending theme: Secret Garden (秘密花園) by Hana Kuk
- Composers: Alan Cheung Ka-shing; Hana Kuk; Kai Yee-nei
- Country of origin: Hong Kong
- Original language: Cantonese
- No. of episodes: 30

Production
- Producers: Lau Kar-ho; Chan Chi-kong
- Production locations: Hong Kong, Thailand
- Camera setup: Multi camera
- Running time: 45 minutes (per episode)
- Production company: TVB

Original release
- Network: TVB Jade
- Release: 3 May – 11 June 2021

Sinister Beings (Chinese: 逆天奇案) is a 2021 Hong Kong crime television drama produced by Television Broadcasts Limited (TVB), starring Ruco Chan, Ben Wong, Rosina Lam, Crystal Fung as the main leads.

Sinister Beings was the highest rated TVB drama broadcast in 2021. A sequel started filming in May 2023.

== Synopsis ==
Hui Chun-sum (played by Ruco Chan) is an elite in the Organised Crime and Triad Bureau, but he aims to join the Special Duties Unit; while Sum Wai-lik (played by Ben Wong) is another elite in the Organised Crime and Triad Bureau.

However, the police force is attacked by terrorists, causing severe casualties. Chun-sam gives up his dream of joining the Special Duties Unit and stays in the Organised Crime and Triad Bureau. Chun-sam and Wai-lik work together to fight battles of wits with criminals to solve complex cases.

== Cast and characters ==
=== Main cast ===
Cast	Character	Notes
Ruco Chan	Hui Chun-sum (許浚森)	Sum Sir; Senior Inspector of Police; Head of Team A of the Organised Crime and Triad Bureau; Wing's boyfriend, had dated for over 10 years, proposed to her in Ep. 19 and broke up in Ep. 30 after she found out that Sum Sir had a one-night stand with Ana
Ben Wong	Sum Wai-lik (沈韋力)	Nic Sir; Senior Inspector of Police; Head of Team B of the Organised Crime and Triad Bureau; Started dating with Hazel from Ep. 10, broke up in Ep. 18, but still maintained a harmonious relationship with her
Rosina Lam	Ma Wing-Sze (馬穎思)	Wing; Police Constable of the Crime Intelligence Bureau (CIB), promoted to Sergeant in Ep. 6 Sum's girlfriend, have dated for over 10 years, being proposed by him in Ep. 19 and broke up in Ep. 30 after she found out that Sum Sir had a one-night stand with Ana
Crystal Fung	Cheung Hei (張喜)	Ana; Computer hacker Introduced in Ep. 2 Meets Sam Sir when investigating the death of her foster father, gradually develops feelings for him as she associated with him Oriental Daily News called Lam's performance "dazzling".
Joman Chiang	Chung Ka-yu (鍾嘉瑜)	Hazel; Barrister; Introduced in Ep. 2 Nic Sir's love interest, starts dating with him from Ep. 10, broke up in Ep. 18, but still maintained a harmonious relationship with him
Jonathan Cheung	Ngai Tsz-lok (魏子樂)	Marco; Introduced in Ep. 17; Member of the board of directors and the head of Information & Technology Department in “Ngai Fung Group” Rachel's husband Forced Ngai Tung-hoi to step down in Ep. 19 and took on his position as the chairman of Ngai Fung (Main Villain)
Moon Lau	Yau Lai (尤麗)	Rachel; Introduced in Ep. 17; Thai Chinese; Consultant of the Public Relations Department of “Ngai Fung Group” Marco's wife Succumbed to her injuries after a car accident while being pursued by Sum and Nic in Ep. 28 (Main Villain)

=== Supporting cast ===
- Joseph Lee as Mok Chun-pong (莫振邦), better known as Mok Sir , a Senior Superintendent of the Organised Crime and Triad Bureau, Sum Sir and Nic Sir's superior.
- Gabriel Harrison as Ku Shing-kwan (古成鈞), better known as Ku Sir , a Senior Inspector of CIB and Wing's superior.
- Lee Shing-cheong as Ngai Tung-hoi (魏東海), the chairman of “Ngai Fung Group” and Calvin's father. He is Marco's uncle who had been on bad terms with him, and was forced to step down by him in Ep. 19. He was fired in Ep. 24 and killed in Ep. 25.
- Bond Chan as Calvin Ngai Siu-yeung (魏兆揚), the vice chairman of “Ngai Fung Group” and Ngai Tung-hoi's son. He is Marco's cousin who had been on bad terms with him. He was fired in Ep. 24.
- Li Lung-kay as Sum Wang-fuk (沈宏福), Nic Sir's father.

=== Special appearance ===
- Chin Siu-ho as Cheung Yiu-kei (張耀祈), Ana's foster father. He was a Chief Inspector of Police of the SDU and was killed in Ep. 1 during operation. (Ep. 1)
- Nina Paw as a grandmother suffering from Dementia. (Ep. 7)
- Ken Hung, a murderer. (Ep.11-12)
- Mat Yeung as Kwok Ho (郭皓), a member of a triad, who was in fact a police undercover. Blackmailed triad boss to pay off his gambling debt. He was killed in Ep. 14. (Ep. 13–14)
- JW Wong as Pui-yee (佩儀), Kwok Ho's ex-girlfriend. (Ep. 14)
- FAMA (Ep. 15)
- Candy Lo as Marco's deceased mother. She committed suicide due to her husband's affairs when Marco was young. (Ep. 20)
- Michelle Yim as a Thai Chinese.
- Law Lan as Sung Tat's grandmother who committed suicide after her grandson's death.
- Bob Cheung as Sung Tat (宋達), Rachel's deceased boyfriend.
