= Chin Siu-ho =

Hong Kong actor (born 1963)

- 錢嘉華
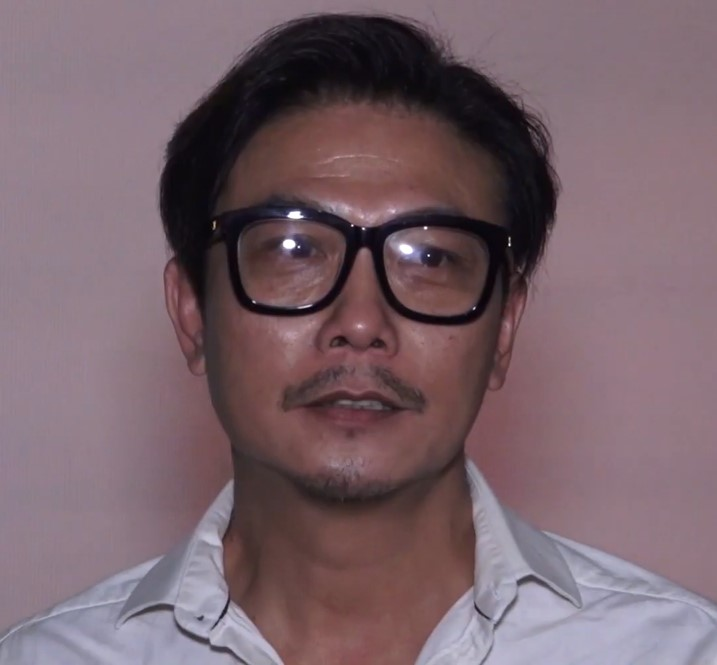
- Chin attending a memorial service for Yueh Hua on 20 November 2018.
- Born: Chin Ka-wah; 26 January 1963 (age 63); Sanshui, Guangdong, China
- Years active: 1978–present
- Spouse(s): Sharon Kwok Sau-wan 郭秀雲 (divorced); Yau Sau-ming

Chinese name
- Traditional Chinese: 錢小豪
- Simplified Chinese: 钱小豪
Transcriptions
Standard Mandarin
- Hanyu Pinyin: qián xiaóhaó
Yue: Cantonese
- Jyutping: cin4 siu2-hou4

Chin Siu-ho (born 26 January 1963) is a Hong Kong actor and martial artist, notable for acting in Mr. Vampire and with Jet Li in Tai Chi Master and Fist of Legend.

== Background ==
He is the older brother of actor Chin Kar-lok and ex-husband of Sharon Kwok Sau-wan, and started martial arts training when he was 10 years old. Chin has performed in over 90 films for famous companies like Shaw Film Company and Golden Harvest Films since the 1970s. He started to gain popularity in the 1980s. His first leading role in the career was Hu Fei in Legend of the Fox. He has performed a lot of horror and gangster films. His recent performance in films industry include Rigor Mortis, Happiness and Vampire Cleanup Department.

Chin heroically rescued a woman who had been held hostage in 1994. At the 2016 Golden Flower Awards International Film Festival, Chin won the Best Actor in a Leading Role in a Micro Movie Award for Rest Is Pending.

== Filmography ==
- Ten Tigers of Kwangtung (1980)
- Legend of the Fox (1980)
- Two Champions of Shaolin (1981)
- The Rebel Intruders (1980)
- Masked Avengers (1981)
- Mahjong Heroes (1981)
- House of Traps (1982)
- The Brave Archer and His Mate (1982)
- Rolls, Rolls, I Love You (1982)
- Brothers From the Walled City (1982)
- Fast Fingers (1983)
- Ghosts Galore (1983)
- Demon of the Lute (1983)
- I Will Finally Knock You Down, Dad! (1984)
- The Legend Continues (1984) (TV series)
- Twinkle, Twinkle Lucky Stars (1985)
- The Man Is Dangerous (1985)
- Mr. Vampire (1985)
- Crazy Shaolin Disciples (1985)
- The Master Strikes Back (1985)
- The Seventh Curse (1986)
- The Story of Doctor Sun Yat-sen (1986)
- Millionaire's Express (1986)
- Love Me Vampire (1986)
- The Final Test (1987)
- New Mr. Vampire (1987)
- Edge of Darkness (1988)
- In the Blood (1988)
- Vampire vs Vampire (1989)
- Into the Fire (1989)
- They Came to Rob Hong Kong (1989)
- The Blonde Fury (1989)
- The Nocturnal Demon (1990)
- Goodbye Hero (1990)
- New Kids in Town (1990)
- The Ultimate Vampire (1991)
- Dead Target (1991)
- Come from China (1992)
- All-Mighty Gambler (1992)
- Hero Dream (1993)
- Happy Partner (1993)
- The Beheaded 1000 (1993)
- Tai Chi Master (1993)
- Fist of Legend (1994)
- Don't Give a Damn (1995)
- Two cop on the beat (1995)
- Stooge, My Love (1996)
- Millennium Dragon (1999)
- Undercover Girls (1999)
- A Battle of Wits (2006)
- Ticket (2008)
- 72 Tenants of Prosperity (2010)
- Vampire Warriors (2010)
- The Lost Bladesman (2011)
- Rigor Mortis (2013)
- Wudang Rules (2015) (TV series)
- Elite Brigade III (2015) (TV series)
- Happiness (2016)
- Vampire Cleanup Department (2017)
- Sinister Beings (2021)
