= Jonathan Cheung =

Hong Kong actor

Jonathan Cheung Wing-hong
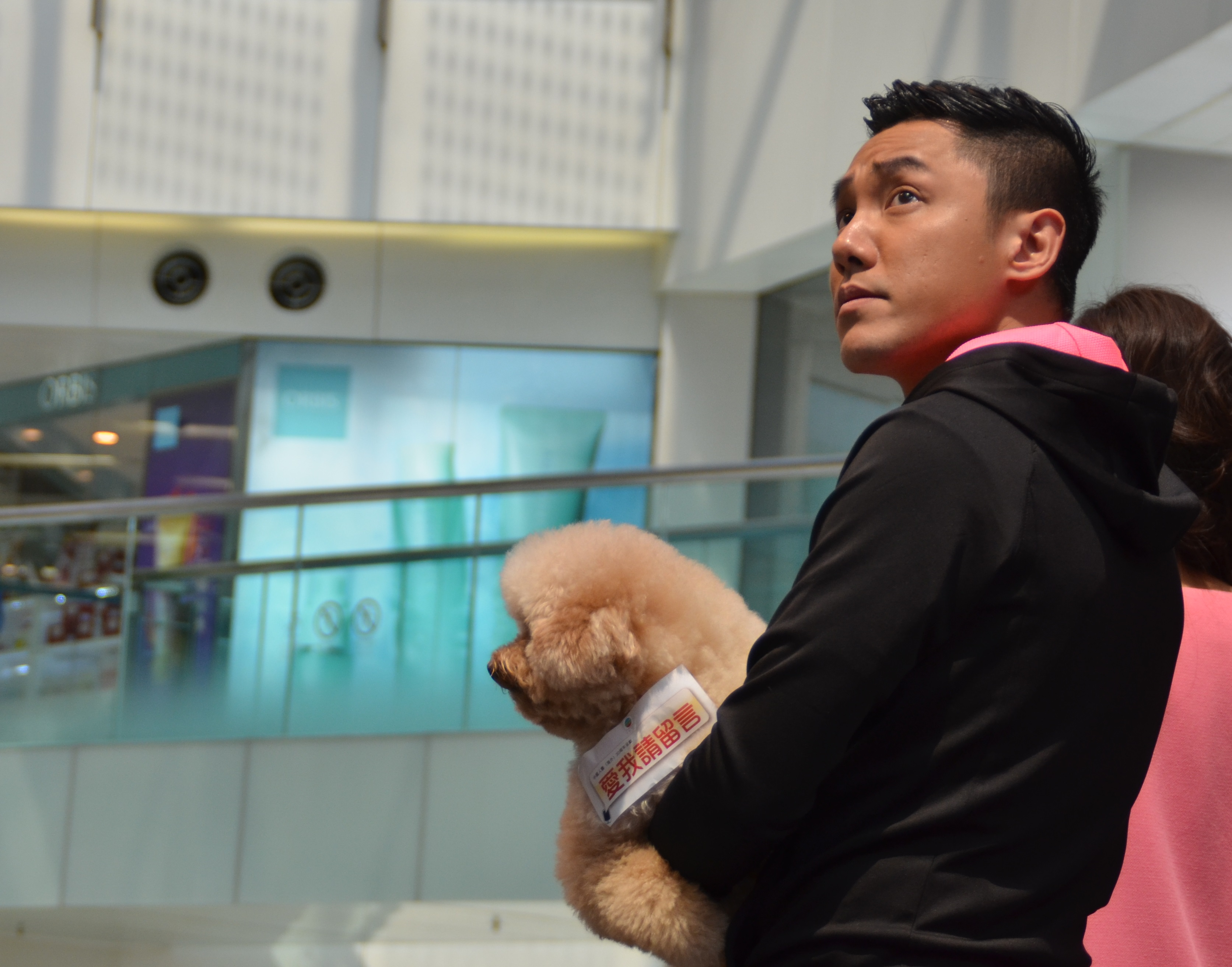
- Cheung in 2014
- Born: Cheung Wing-hong
- Occupation: Actor
- Years active: 2001–2025
- Notable work: House of Spirits; Sinister Beings; Speakers of Law
- Spouse: Angie Mak
- Children: 3
- Awards: TVB Star Awards Malaysia – Favourite TVB Most Improved Male Artiste; 2016 The Last Healer in Forbidden City, House of Spirits, A Fist Within Four Walls TVB Anniversary Awards – Most Improved Male Artiste; 2016 The Last Healer in Forbidden City, House of Spirits, A Fist Within Four Walls, Spirits On Vacation

Chinese name
- Traditional Chinese: 張頴康
- Simplified Chinese: 张颕康
Transcriptions
Standard Mandarin
- Hanyu Pinyin: Zhāng Yǐngkāng
Yue: Cantonese
- Yale Romanization: Jēung Winghōng

Jonathan Cheung Wing-hong (Chinese: 張頴康) is a Hong Kong actor. As of October 2026, he is no longer with TVB.

== Career ==
In 2006, Jonathan Cheung joined TVB by Andy Lau’s recommendation and mostly played supporting roles. In 2012, he gained more attention from the audience with his supporting role in the drama Three Kingdoms RPG, starring alongside Kenneth Ma.

In 2016, Cheung gained recognition with his performance in the drama House of Spirits, winning the Favourite TVB Most Improved Male Artiste award at the 2016 TVB Star Awards Malaysia. He also earned his first Best Supporting Actor nomination and won the Most Improved Male Artiste award at the 2016 TVB Anniversary Awards.

In 2019, Cheung starred in the drama Our Unwinding Ethos as the second male lead for the first time. With his role in the drama The Man Who Kills Trouble, he garnered his first Best Actor nomination at the 2019 TVB Anniversary Awards.

In 2020, Cheung received attention for his villainous role in the drama Forensic Heroes IV, and was nominated for Best Supporting Actor at the 2020 TVB Anniversary Awards again. In 2021, he starred in the drama Sinister Beings as the main villain, again receiving attention from netizens. With this role, he was placed among the top 5 nominees for the Best Supporting Actor at the 2021 TVB Anniversary Awards.

== Personal life ==
Jonathan Cheung's ancestral place is Zhongshan, Guangdong.

Cheung and TVB host Angie Mak first met each other at TVB Anniversary gala's rehearsal. Cheung then tried to know more about her from his acting classmates and searched online. While they were together Mak got to know more about Cheung. They got married in 2012. Mak gave birth to their daughter, Makayla (張雅喬), on 22 May 2014. Their eldest son (張迅喬) was born on 17 Oct 2017. On 21 May 2021, Cheung announced on Instagram that Mak is pregnant with their third child. On 24 September, the couple announced that their second son was born.

== Filmography ==
=== TV dramas ===
Year	Title	Role	Additional Notes
2008	Best Selling Secrets	Ah Chu	Ep. 23 and 301
2008	Off Pedder	Cheung Tsai	Ep. 74
2008	Forensic Heroes II	Ng Kai-bor	Minor Role
2009	A Watchdog's Tale	Chiu Gor	Ep. 1
2010	Can't Buy Me Love	Tai Tak-leung	Minor Role
2010	The Mysteries of Love	Johnny Kong Yiu-chong	Ep. 12
2010	When Lanes Merge	Ben	Cameo
2010	Every Move You Make	Assistant manager	Ep. 2
2010	Twilight Investigation	Chiu Ying-tat	Supporting Role
2011	7 Days in Life	Kwok Chi-wai	Minor Role
2011	Forensic Heroes III	Cheung Wing-hong	Ep. 17
2012	Witness Insecurity	Wong Chi-tong (爆呔)	Supporting Role
2012	Three Kingdoms RPG	Fan Geng	Supporting Role (Szema Shun's good friend)
2012–2013	Friendly Fire	Wat Ping-yuen	Minor Role
2013–2014	Return of the Silver Tongue	Fan Kang	Major Supporting Role
2013–2014	Coffee Cat Mama	Fan Fat	Major Supporting Role
2014	Swipe Tap Love	Roger Ho Chi-on	Major Supporting Role
2014	Ghost Dragon of Cold Mountain	Prince of Jurchen kingdom	Cameo
2015	Eye in the Sky	"Fate" Fan Fei	Major Supporting Role; Nominated - TVB Star Awards Malaysia for My Favourite TVB Most Improved Male Artiste
2015	Wudang Rules	Law Yik-hin	Major Supporting Role
2015	Every Step You Take	To Ching-hang	Supporting Role
2015	With or Without You	Song Shenzong	Supporting Role
2016	The Last Healer in Forbidden City	Zoi-fung, Prince Chun	Major Supporting Role TVB Anniversary Award for Most Improved Male Artiste; TVB Star Award Malaysia for Favourite TVB Most Improved Male Artiste
2016	House of Spirits	Anthony Po Yu	Major Supporting Role TVB Star Award Malaysia for Favourite TVB Most Improved Male Artiste; TVB Anniversary Award for Most Improved Male Artiste
2016	A Fist Within Four Walls	Chan Kit-lun (甲辰)	Supporting Role TVB Star Award Malaysia for Favourite TVB Most Improved Male Artiste; TVB Anniversary Award for Most Improved Male Artiste
2017	Provocateur	Cyrus Ling Chun	Major Supporting Role
2017	The Tofu War	Bosco Dao Cheung	Major Supporting Role
2017	Heart and Greed	Dr. Ching Chi-mei	Guest Appearance in Ep. 38
2018	Succession War	Aisin Gioro Yonglin	Major Supporting Role
2019	Our Unwinding Ethos	Yik Ming-yin (易Sir)	2nd Male Lead
2019	Justice Bao: The First Year	Song Renzong	Supporting Role
2019	The Man Who Kills Troubles	Man Ho-chuen (Man Sir)	2nd Male Lead
2020	Forensic Heroes IV	Michael Ma	Supporting Role
2021	Sinister Beings	Marco Ngai Tsz-lok	Major Supporting Role
2021	Plan "B"	Kwan Chi-chung	Major Supporting Role
2021	Take Two	Nicholas Yuen Yau-fun	Major Supporting Role
2022	Your Highness	Fan Chong-lung	Major Supporting Role
2023	Speakers of Law	Ma Wai-hung	Major Supporting Role
2023-2024	You’re Just Not Her	Loius Lok Wai-To	Major Supporting Role
2024	Sinister Beings (Sr. 2)	Marco Ngai Tsz-lok	Major Supporting Role
2024	No Room For Crime	Sou Gwok-wai	Major Supporting Role
2024	Darkside of the Moon	Cheuk Sai-kei (SK)	Supporting role

=== Film ===
Year	Title	Role	Additional Notes
2003	Cat and Mouse 《老鼠愛上貓》	Zhang Long 張龍	
2003	Infernal Affairs II 《無間道II》	Da B (Young version) 林國平	
2005	I'll Call You 《得閒飲茶》		Cameo
2006	My Mother Is a Belly Dancer 《師奶唔易做》	Ken	Minor role
2007	Whispers and Moans 《性工作者十日談》	Eric	
2008	Besieged City 《圍城》	Chu Hin	
2011	I Love Hong Kong 《我愛香港》	Neighbour	
2023	Bursting Point《爆裂點》	Roy	

== Awards and nominations ==
=== TVB Anniversary Awards ===
Year	Category	Drama / Role	Result
2016	Most Improved Male Artiste	The Last Healer in Forbidden City, House of Spirits, A Fist Within Four Walls, Spirits On Vacation	Won
2016	Best Supporting Actor	Spirits On Vacation — Po Yu (Anthony)	Nominated
2017	Best Supporting Actor	The Tofu War — Dao Cheung (Bosco)	Nominated
2018	Best Supporting Actor	Succession War — Aisin Gioro Yonglin	Nominated
2019	Best Actor	The Man Who Kills Troubles — Man Ho-chuen	Nominated
2019	Most Popular Male Character	The Man Who Kills Troubles — Man Ho-chuen	Nominated
2020	Best Supporting Actor	Forensic Heroes IV — Michael Ma	Nominated
2021	Best Supporting Actor	Sinister Beings — Ngai Tsz-lok (Marco)	Top 5
2021	Best Supporting Actor	Take Two — Yuen Yau-fun (Nicholas)	Nominated
2021	Most Popular Male Character	Plan "B" — Kwan Chi-chung	Nominated
2021	Most Popular Onscreen Partnership	Sinister Beings (with Moon Lau)	Nominated
2022	Best Supporting Actor	Your Highness — Fan Chong-long	Top 5
2022	Most Popular Male Character	Your Highness — Fan Chong-long	Nominated
2022	Most Popular Onscreen Partnership	Your Highness (with Kalok Chow, Jeannie Chan, JW Wong, Brian Chu)	Won
2023	Best Supporting Actor	Speakers of Law — Ma Wai-hung	Top 10

=== TVB Star Awards Malaysia ===
Year	Category	Drama / Role	Result
2015	Favourite TVB Most Improved Male Artiste	Eye in the Sky, Wudang Rules, Every Step You Take, With or Without You	Nominated
2016	Favourite TVB Most Improved Male Artiste	The Last Healer in Forbidden City, House of Spirits, A Fist Within Four Walls	Won
2017	Top 17 TVB Favourite Characters	The Tofu War — Dao Cheung (Bosco)	Nominated

=== StarHub TVB Awards ===
Year	Category	Drama / Role	Result
2017	My Favourite TVB Supporting Actor	The Tofu War — Dao Cheung (Bosco)	Nominated

=== People's Choice Television Awards ===
Year	Category	Drama / Role	Result
2021	People's Choice Best Supporting Actor	Sinister Beings — Ngai Tsz-lok (Marco)	Nominated
