= 2 Champions of Shaolin =

1980 Hong Kong film by Chang Cheh

2 Champions Of Shaolin
- DVD Cover

Chinese name
- Traditional Chinese: 少林與武當
- Simplified Chinese: 少林与武当
Transcriptions
Standard Mandarin
- Hanyu Pinyin: Shàolín Yǔ Wǔdāng
Yue: Cantonese
- Jyutping: Siu2 Lam4 Jyu5 Mou5 Dong1
- Directed by: Chang Cheh
- Screenplay by: Chang Cheh; Ni Kuang
- Produced by: Mona Fong
- Starring: Lo Mang; Chiang Sheng; Wong Lik; Sun Chien; Lu Feng; Chin Siu-ho
- Cinematography: Cho Wai-Kei
- Edited by: Chiang Hsing-Lung; Lee Yim-Hoi
- Music by: Eddie H. Wang
- Production company: Shaw Brothers Studio
- Distributed by: Shaw Brothers Studio
- Release date: 12 April 1980 (Hong Kong)
- Running time: 101 minutes
- Country: Hong Kong
- Languages: Cantonese; Mandarin
- Box office: HK $1,181,000

2 Champions of Shaolin (Chinese: 少林與武當; alternatively titled Two Champions Of Death and Shaolin Vs Wu-Tang) is a 1980 Shaw Brothers film directed by Chang Cheh. Starring the Venom Mob, it continues the then-popular theme of feuds between Shaolin and the Wu-Tang Clan.

== Plot ==
Two young warriors from the Ming loyalist Shaolin Clan are engaged in a deadly secret mission that could bring down the Qing empire. Tong Qianjin (Lo Meng), dubbed the "Shaolin Hercules", is sent to take revenge on local members of the Wu-Tang Clan. While at an inn, he is attacked by two members, Li Dezong (Yu Tai-Ping) and Li Bashan (Wong Lik), who use throwing knives against him. He barely escapes and is saved by Jin Tailai (Sun Chien) and his sister Bi'er (Yeung Ching-Ching), who reveal themselves to be former acquaintances of the Wu-Tang but are now on the run after refusing to kill for the Qing court. They teach Tong a way to counter the knives, which he uses to best and ultimately kill Li Dezong when he encounters Tong in town with fellow Shaolin disciple Hu Huigan (Chiang Sheng).

The Wu-Tang Clan swears revenge and Li Bashan challenges Tong and Hu to a duel, promising to honor the outcome. During the duel, Hu kills a Wu Tang fighter while Tong defeats Bashan. However, the latter refuses to submit due to the death of the clan member and proceeds to attack Tong. Jin Tailai and Bi'er arrive and Jin reminds Bashan of his promise to honor the duel's outcome. Bashan ruefully allows them to leave with Tong and Hu. Tong and Bi'er later marry but the wedding is raided by the Wu-Tang. Bi'er is killed by Bashan's daughter, Er Huan (Candy Wen). Jin is killed in the ensuing fight while Tong is overpowered and kidnapped. Hu meanwhile, was too inebriated to take part in the fight. Tong is later set free by Wei Xing Hong (Chin Siu-ho), Er Huan's lover and a Wu-Tang member who sympathizes with the Shaolin disciples.

While grieving at Jin Tailai and Bi'er's graves, Tong is approached by a young man who introduces himself as Gao Xiu (Lu Feng) and the two befriend each other. However, Gao, real name Gao Jinzhong, is secretly a Wu-Tang member and pupil of one of its strongest fighters Bak Pei. Upon gaining Tong's trust, Gao blindsides him with silver needles. Wei arrives to stop Gao from killing him with Hu following close behind. When Gao orders Wei to kill the Shaolin students, Wei refuses and chooses to fight the Wu-Tang alongside Tong and Hu. He helps remove the needles from Tong's body while Hu and Gao begin fighting. When Bashan then arrives, Wei confronts and kills him but Er Huan witnesses the act. When she tearfully asks him why he would betray his own adoptive family, Wei, torn between his allegiance to both the Li family and to the Ming, commits suicide. Tong and Hu are able to defeat and kill Gao but are mortally wounded and die from their injuries moments after.

== Cast ==
- Lo Meng as Tung Chen Chin/Tong Qianjin
- Chiang Sheng as Hu Wei Chin/Hu Huigan
- Wong Lik as Pa San/Li Bashan
- Sun Chien as Chin Ta Lei/Jin Tailai
- Lu Feng as Kao Ching Chun/Gao Jinzhong
- Chin Siu-ho as Wei Hsing Hung/Wei Xinghong
- Yu Tai-Ping as Li Te Tung/Li Dezong
- Candy Wen as Li Er Huan
- Walter Tso as Feng Dao De
- Yeung Ching-Ching as Pei/Jin Bi'er
- Kwan Chung as Master Zhishan
- Hsiao Yu as Li Jinlun
- Tony Tam as Li Yasong
- Lau Fong-Sai as Xie Yafu
- Chan Hung as Fang Xiaoyu
- Lam Chi-Tai as Fang Meiyu

== Trivia ==
- The film was digitally manipulated by Joseph Kahn for the Chemical Brothers' music video "Get Yourself High".
- Actors Philip Kwok and Lu Feng had a dispute as to who was to be the main action choreographer for the film, resulting in Chang Cheh subsequently dropping Lu from Ode to Gallantry, which starred Kwok as the lead protagonist.
