= Killarney Secondary School =

Public secondary school in Vancouver, British Columbia

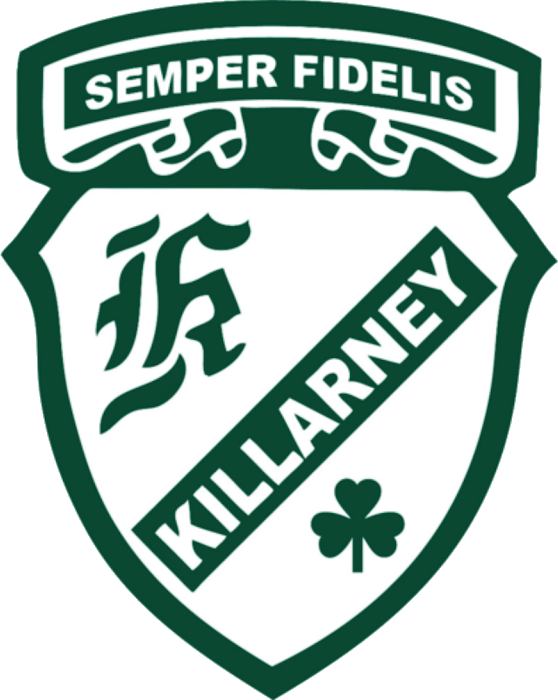

Location
- 6454 Killarney Street; Vancouver, British Columbia, V5S 2X7; Canada; 49°13′31.4″N 123°2′42.8″W

Information
- School type: Secondary school
- Motto: "Semper fidelis" ("Always faithful")
- Founded: September 29, 1957
- School board: School District 39 Vancouver
- Superintendent: Helen McGregor
- Area trustee: Preeti Faridkot
- School number: 03939016
- Director: Ranjit Bains (Director of Instruction)
- Principal: Chris Parker
- Grades: 8–12
- Enrolment: 1,565
- Language: English
- Area: Killarney
- Colours: Green and Grey
- Mascot: Cougar
- Team name: Killarney Cougars
- Public transit access: 26, 49, 430
- Website: killarney.vsb.bc.ca

Killarney Secondary School is a public secondary school in Vancouver, British Columbia, Canada. It is the largest public secondary school in the city by area. The school and the neighbourhood it is located in are named after Killarney, Ireland.

== History ==
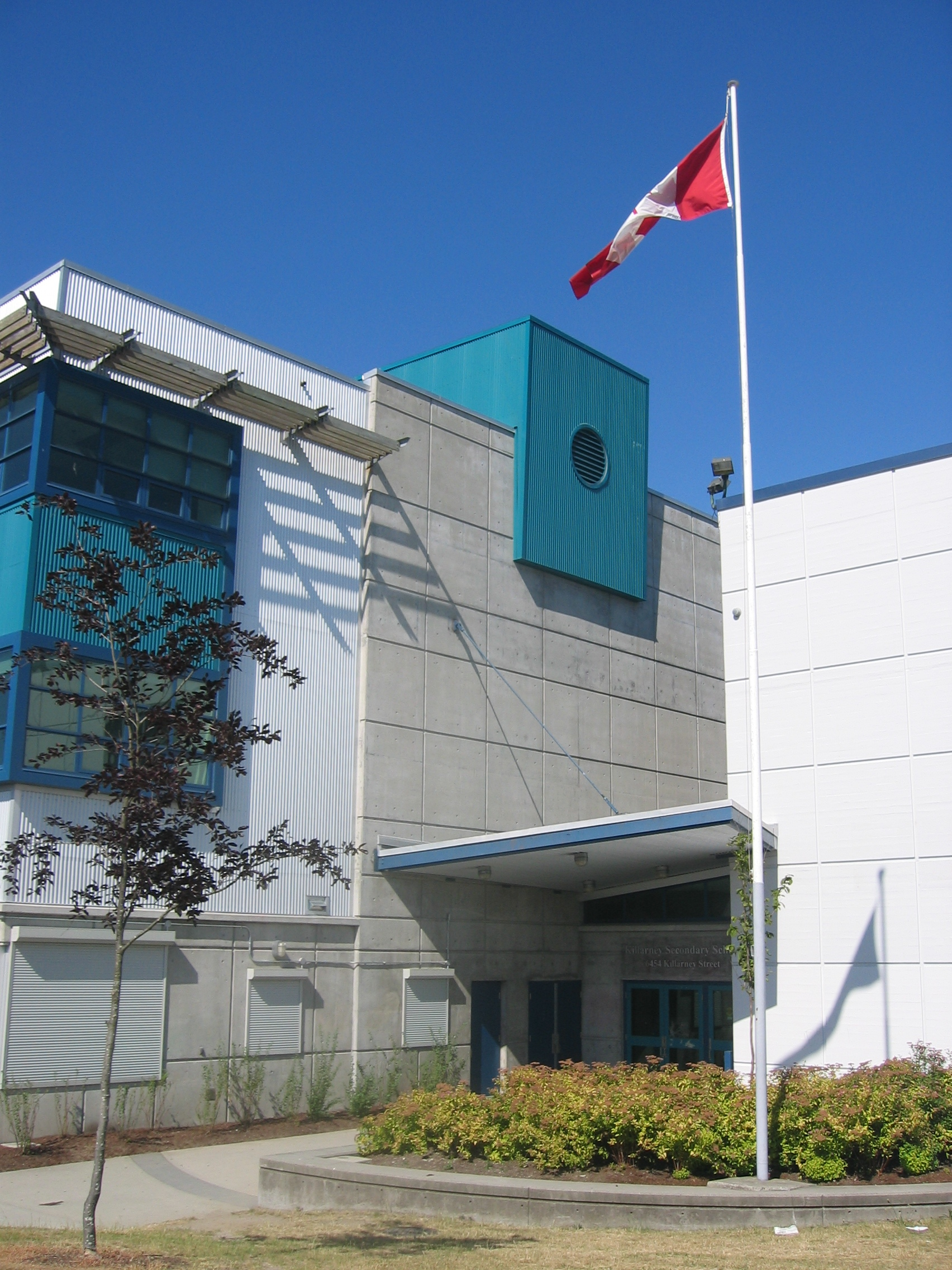
The southwest entrance of Killarney

Killarney opened on September 29, 1957, beginning with students from Grades 7–10 and one wing (A-Wing). The teaching staff consisted of 52 members under the direction of principal Tom Alsbury. Grade 11 was added the following year, and Grade 12 the year after that, with the first class of senior students graduating as the class of 1960.

At the time of its opening, the school was surrounded by vacant land as the areas to the east and south were just beginning to see development. Killarney continued to grow especially as the area south of 49th Avenue matured. November 1961 saw the addition of a new wing to the building which included an auditorium and stage (B-Wing). Just over six years later in December 1967, D-Wing was completed, which greatly expanded and improved the existing science and industrial education facilities. In the 1970s, seven portable classrooms were placed on the grounds to accommodate over 1,700 students enrolled by that time (construction of a neighbouring secondary school had been delayed). Within a decade, enrolment reached 2,000 and has remained around this number since. C-Wing was added in 2003, with a new entrance, a foyer, 21 new classrooms, a new band-room, and a state of the art music lab.

== Current ==
Killarney is the largest secondary school in Vancouver by area, and a comprehensive school currently with around 2,000 students in Grades 8–12 with 167 teaching and non-teaching staff. Extra-curricular activities are abundant, with more than 35 clubs and a full inter-high school sports program. Killarney also has one of the highest enrolments in the district in the senior maths and sciences.

=== Fine arts ===
Killarney Secondary School offers a Fine Arts Program that includes music programs in band, choral music, and strings, as well as programs in visual arts, graphics, and drama. The school's band, choir, and strings programs have performed at events outside Canada.

KAFT, the Killarney Association for Film and Theatre, was established in September 2012, with the purpose of promoting the dramatic arts to the students in Killarney.

=== Achievements ===
The University of British Columbia Mathematics Department has been releasing a specific annual study of B.C. secondary schools since at least 1987. It is a school-by-school study based on final standings in each December for the various UBC First Year Calculus Courses for students who graduated from secondary schools in British Columbia. Killarney ranked in the top third for 13 consecutive years from 1991 to 2003, dropped down the list to 12th (of 21 schools) in 2004, and returned to the top third (5th out of 23 schools) in 2005.

== Notable alumni ==
- Angela Chow, celebrity for Phoenix TV, former Channel V host of STAR
- Avan Jogia, actor (Twisted, Victorious)
- Carat Cheung, winner of Miss Hong Kong 2012, and third-place winner of Miss Chinese International
- Colin Mochrie, improv comedian famous for being on Whose Line is it Anyway
- Jenna Talackova, Canadian model and television personality
- Kelly Yu, Chinese Canadian singer and actress
- Kurtis Ling, professional Dota 2 player and 2015 The International winner
- Matt Frenette, drummer for the rock band Loverboy
- Mike Klassen, Vancouver city councillor
- Milan Lucic, professional hockey player for the NHL's Calgary Flames, 2011 Stanley Cup winner
- Ra McGuire, singer and songwriter for Trooper
- Wai Young, former Conservative Party MP for Vancouver South
