= In the Blood (1988 film) =

1988 Hong Kong film by Corey Yuen

- Film poster
- Traditional Chinese: 神探父子兵
- Simplified Chinese: 神探父子兵
- Hanyu Pinyin: Shén Tàn Fù Zǐ Bīng
- Jyutping: San4 Taam3 Fu6 Zi2 Bing1
- Directed by: Corey Yuen
- Written by: Yuen Kai-chi
- Produced by: Wu Ma
- Starring: Andy Lau; Bill Tung; Chin Siu-ho; Siu Hung-mui; Wu Ma
- Cinematography: Tom Lau
- Edited by: Peter Cheung
- Music by: Chris Babida
- Production companies: D&B Films; Bo Ho Films
- Distributed by: Golden Harvest
- Release date: 22 July 1988
- Running time: 101 minutes
- Country: Hong Kong
- Language: Cantonese
- Box office: HK$6,804,354

In the Blood (Chinese: 神探父子兵) is a 1988 Hong Kong action film directed by Corey Yuen and starring Andy Lau and Bill Tung. The film was theatrically released on 22 July 1988.

== Plot ==
Criminal Investigation Department (CID) inspector Wah and his father, Commissioner Louis are outstanding police officers who share a close relationship. On the other hand, father and son beat cops, Uncle Ma and Dan always bicker, and end up pulling their pistol at each other while giving a parking ticket. Wah and Louis attempt to mediate Dan and Ma and convinces Dan to apologize to his father, but Ma berates him, much to Louis' annoyance. Dan gets promoted to the CID and gains confidence after successfully catching a thief. Dan later participates in his first drug raid operation in a pier, where Wah manages to arrest a number of criminals but the mastermind, Fei-ying, escapes as Dan was busy gambling with some colleagues and inadvertently kicks his superintendent "Potato Knives" into the water and is put on penalty. Ma blames himself for his son's failure, but Wah convinces him that Dan just needs an opportunity to prove himself. However, Dan foils another drug bust at a bowling alley when he interrupts Wah, who was fighting Fei-ying, allowing the latter to flee again, but manage to arrest Fei-ying's girlfriend, Sze. Dan bails Sze out after finding out she is the daughter of Ma's old friend, Auntie King, but Sze runs away after being harassed by patrons at her mother's bar. Sze later questions Fei-ying whether he is a drug trafficker, which he denies.

Wah receives intel and leads his team to tail Fei-ying's client, No. 6, but Dan disregards Wah's instructions and attempts to arrest No. 6 himself, which backfires when No. 6 takes Dan's pistol, but Wah saves him just in time by killing No. 6. Dan is suspended from his duties while Wah is under inspection as a result. Ma pleads with Louis to help Dan, causing Dan to be mocked by his colleagues and Dan runs away from home, leaving a note to his father he will return after he proves his worth by solving a big case. One night, Dan sees Sze in the streets and manages to find Fei-ying at a pier but was captured by the latter and his henchmen. Wah arrives in time to rescue Dan and fights off Fei-ying's henchmen but Dan has his leg broken. In the hospital, Dan confesses he feels like a useless son and wants to achieve success in order for his father to retire with pride and pleads Wah to reinstate the position. Ma and Louis overhear the conversation, with the latter promising to help Louis.

Wah and Dan managed to arrest one of Fei-ying's underlings and finds Fei-ying's hideout, where Fei-ying just had an argument with Sze after she caught him making out with another woman. When Wah and Dan arrive, Fei-ying hides while Sze steals Fei-ying's cocaine which she later flushes down the toilet. Fei-ying calls Sze asking for the cocaine back and she tells him to meet at Wo Hop Shek Public Cemetery the next day at 12 PM. When Sze meets with Fei-ying, she attempts to blow her car up where they make out, but Fei-ying escapes while she dies in the explosion right before Wah and Dan, who planted a tracker in Sze's purse. Fei-ying then goes to Auntie King's bar demanding her to hand his cocaine and assaults her before Wah and Dan arrive and fights him until Fei-ying then holds Dan's nephew, Ball hostage. However, Ball has inadvertently swapped Dan's pistol with his similarly looking toy earlier and Fei-ying shoots Dan twice before Wah viciously beats Fei-ying with a metal tube. As Fei-ying is arrested, Dan also dies from his wounds, which deeply saddens Ma, who happens to be on beat duty nearby and witnesses his son dying.

== Cast ==
- Andy Lau as Wah (華仔), an outstanding inspector of the Criminal Investigation Department (CID) who was previously trained in England for two years and a skilled unarmed combatant and marksman.
- Siu Hung-mui as Sze (阿詩), Fei-ying's girlfriend who is unaware of his drug trafficking activities and turns against him after discovering his true identity and cheating on her.
- Chin Siu-ho as Fei-ying (飛鷹), a cocaine trafficker.
- Bill Tung as Louis (標叔), Wah's father and Uncle Ma's close friend who is the commissioner of the CID.
- Wu Ma as Uncle Ma (馬叔), a beat cop and Dan's father who singlehandedly raised his son when wife died right after giving birth.
- Corey Yuen as Dan (阿旦), Uncle Ma's son who often quarrels with his father but deep down, he wants to achieve success for his father to be proud of him, although his impulsiveness and unwise decisions often land him in trouble.
- Woo Kam as Auntie King (瓊姨), a bar owner who is Sze's mother and widow of Uncle Ma's former colleague who died on duty.
- Sammo Hung as Hung Kei (洪記), a Dai pai dong owner.
- Tai Po as Tai Po (太保), Wah's subordinate and Dan's colleague.
- Sai Gwa-Pau as stammering waiter at Wan Loi tea room where Uncle Ma and Dan frequents.
- Philip Ko as No. 6 (六號), Fei-ying's cocaine client.
- Lau Chau-sang as Curry
- Richard Ng as a driver whose parking meter expired and gets in the middle of a quarrel between Dan and Uncle Ma on issuing a ticket. (cameo)
- Anthony Chan as an experienced robber who was foiled Wah's team. (cameo)
- Alfred Cheung as an experienced robber who was foiled by Wah's team. (cameo)
- Chow Kam-kong as Yee Po (二保), Wah's subordinate and Dan's colleague.
- Lee Chi-kit as Wah's subordinate and Dan's colleague.
- Chu Tau as Fei-ying's henchman.
- Peter Chan Lung as Officer 5726, a beat cop who is envious of Dan
- Yuen Mo-chow as Fei-ying's henchmen at the pier. (uncredited)
- Kwan Yung as Fei-ying's henchmen at the pier. (uncredited)
- Lee Scott as Potato Knives (薯仔刀), superintendent of the CID who has a great dislike for Dan.
