= Wudang Rules =

2015 Hong Kong television series

- Official poster
- Also known as: Wudang Worship
- 潮拜武當
- Genre: Modern Drama, Martial arts, Action
- Created by: Hong Kong Television Broadcasts Limited
- Starring: Chin Siu-ho; Tavia Yeung; Yuen Qiu; Timmy Hung; Derek Kok; Toby Leung; Stanley Cheung; Jonathan Cheung
- Theme music composer: Alan Cheung
- Opening theme: Fearless (無懼) by C All Star
- Country of origin: Hong Kong
- Original languages: Cantonese; Mandarin
- No. of episodes: 20

Production
- Executive producer: Catherine Tsang
- Producer: Nelson Cheung
- Production locations: Hong Kong, Wudang Mountains, China
- Editor: Wong Gwok-fai
- Camera setup: Multi camera
- Running time: 45 minutes
- Production company: TVB

Original release
- Network: TVB Jade, HD Jade
- Release: 25 May – 19 June 2015

Wudang Rules
- Chinese: 潮拜武當
- Literal meaning: "Wudang Worship"
Transcriptions
Standard Mandarin
- Hanyu Pinyin: Cháo Bài Wǔ Dāng
Yue: Cantonese
- Yale Romanization: Chìuh Bāai Móuh Dōng
- Jyutping: Ciu4 Baai1 Mou5 Dong1

Wudang Rules (Chinese: 潮拜武當; Jyutping: Ciu4 Baai1 Mou5 Dong1; Cantonese Yale: Chìuh Bāai Móuh Dōng; literally "Wudang Worship") is a 2015 Hong Kong martial arts, action themed television drama created and produced by TVB, starring Chin Siu-ho, Tavia Yeung, Yuen Qiu, Timmy Hung, Derek Kok and Toby Leung as the main cast. Filming took place from August until October 2014. The drama began airing on Hong Kong's Jade and HD Jade channels from May 25 until June 19, 2015, every Monday through Friday during its 8:30-9:30 pm timeslot with a total of 20 episodes.

Wudang Rules is Chin Siu-ho's first drama with TVB in twenty years. He last starred in TVB's 1996 drama (俠義見青天).

== Synopsis ==
After a set-back in life, former Hong Kong undercover detective Pau Kai-chung (Chin Siu-ho) heads to the Wudang Mountains in Hubei, China to get away from life. At Wudang he re-connects with his former martial arts senior Mo Yee-shan (Yuen Qiu), who now operates an inn and martial arts school in the Wudang Mountains. She also takes in a intellectually disabled man named Ho Ching-tung (Derek Kok) with a mysterious past. Kai-chung takes up a job as a chef at Yee-shan's inn.

Originally known for being a land of spiritual calmness, Wudang enters a state of chaos after a group of new tai chi students from Hong Kong are taken in. The new students include the fighter Cheung Ka-kong (Timmy Hung), son of a wealthy businessman Lok Yik-hin (Jonathan Cheung), personal female bodyguard Yeung Ching-wu (Toby Leung), model Siu Yuk (Regen Cheung) and behind came Yee Shan's daughter Lok Yeung (Tavia Yeung).

The appearance of Lok Yeung triggers a painful memory in Kai Chung. Lok Yeung's purpose in staying in Wudang is to convince her mother to give her lodging establishment to a Hong Kong investment group so as to gain credit for herself. After a series of incidents, Yee Shan promises to give up the establishment if Lok Yeung manages to win a competition in three months. Meanwhile, Yee Shan purposely injures herself so Kai Chung can teach her tai chi class. Eventually, Ching Tung overcomes his mental illness and becomes well again. He exposes Kai Chung's true identity, and danger shrouds the Wudang Mountains.

== Cast ==
=== Main cast ===
- Chin Siu-ho as Pau Kai-chung (包繼沖)
- Tavia Yeung as Lok Yeung, Ocean (樂 洋), Yee-shan's daughter
- Yuen Qiu as Mo Yee-shan (毛倚珊), Ocean's mother
- Timmy Hung as Cheung Ka-kong, Ken (張家港), Kung fu obsession
- Derek Kok as Ho Ching-tung (何正東) /（番薯）during memory loss
- Toby Leung as Yeung Ching-wu (楊晴瑚), Chinese name pronounce as Yang Cheng Hu, a place that is famous for its hairy crabs; so, her nickname is Hai Mui (Crab-Girl); Yik-hin's bodyguard
- Jonathan Cheung as Law Yik-hin, Charles (羅亦軒), wealthy playboy; Hai mui protection target

=== Extended cast ===
- Stanley Cheung as Cheung Ka-chun (張家川)
- Kirby Lam as Mo Gwaa (毛 瓜)
- Mandy Ho as Mo Dau (毛 荳)
- Rainky Wai as Mia Lau (劉星語; lau sing jyu)
- Regen Cheung as Siu Yuk (蕭 鈺), Model/Singer named 'Shangri-La'
- Lee Yee-man as Man Yee-lei (文綺莉)
- Yoyo Chen as Ho Ching-lam (何靖嵐)
- Akina Hong as Sek Lam (石 琳)
- Jason Chan as Wah Yi-gai (華以楷)
- Rosanne Lui as Chin Yam-yam (錢鑫鑫), Siu Yuk's mother and manager
- Hinson Chou as Chiu Yuan-coeng (趙元暢)
- Carat Cheung as Diana Dai (戴安娜; daai on naa)
- Helen Ng as Dan Lai-chu (單麗珠)
- Teresa Ha Ping as Pretty elder lady Tong (唐靚姑; tong leng gu)
- Pauline Chow as Ma Chun-wai (馬臻蕙)
- Lily Poon as Kuk Man-ting (曲文靜)
- Otto Chan as Zin Lun (賤 侖)
- Kong Fu-keung as Wong Gin-bong (王建邦)
- Winston Tsang as Man Kin (文 乾)
- Kong Wing-fai as Yeung Seung-ci (楊尚施)
- Chan Wing-chun as Lau Fok-wing (劉福榮)
- Ceci So as Fan Chu-heung (樊朝香)
- Henry Lo as Cheung Hoi-ho (張凱厚)
- King Kong Lam as Dai Gwan (大 軍)
- Alan Tam Kwan-lun as Mo Kwan (武 坤)
- Mak Ka-lun as Wilson
- Russell Cheung as Chung (昌)
- Albert Law as Lok Fu (樂 賦)
- Barry Cox
- Ivana Wong (王舒銳) as cosplay model (模特兒)
- Virginia Lau as cosplay model (模特兒)

=== Parody cast and main characters ===
- Yugo as Lok Yeung <Ocean> (乐洋)
- Futo as Ho Ching-lam (何靖岚)

== Development ==
- This drama marked Derek Kok's last performance for TVB.
- Sisley Choi was originally cast for the role of Mia Lau. However, due to a schedule conflict of filming Young Charioteers, Rainky Wai replaced her.
- The costume fitting ceremony was held on August 13, 2014, at 12:30 pm Tseung Kwan O TVB City Studio One.
- Filming at the Wudang Mountains took place in October 2014.
- Filming of the drama began in August 2014 and ended in October 2014.
- Wudang Rules was one of the dramas previewed at "TVB Sales Presentation 2015" held in November 2014.

== Viewership Ratings ==
#	Timeslot (HKT)	Week	Episode(s)	Average points	Peaking points
1	Mon – Fri 20:30	25–29 May 2015	1 — 5	23	27
2	Mon – Fri 20:30	01-5 June 2015	6 — 10	23	27
3	Mon – Fri 20:30	08-12 June 2015	11 — 15	23	27
4	Mon – Fri 20:30	15–19 June 2015	16 — 20	23	26
Total average				23	26.5

== Awards and nominations ==
Year	Ceremony	Category	Nominee	Result
2015	StarHub TVB Awards	My Favourite TVB Theme Song	Fearless (無懼) by C All Star	Nominated
2015	TVB Anniversary Awards	TVB Anniversary Award for Favourite Drama Song	Fearless (無懼) by C All Star	Nominated
2015	TVB Anniversary Awards	TVB Anniversary Award for Best Drama	Wudang Rules	Nominated

== International Broadcast ==
- Malaysia - 8TV (Malaysia), TV2 (Malaysia)
