= House of Spirits (TV series) =

Hong Kong television series

- Official poster
- 一屋老友記
- Genre: Modern Drama, Comedy, Family, Supernatural
- Created by: Hong Kong Television Broadcasts Limited
- Written by: Ma Chun-wing (head writer), Au Yuk-han, Ho Ching-yi, Yeung Suet-Yee, Wong Sau-ching, Ma Ching-man
- Starring: Bobby Au-yeung; Nancy Wu; Helena Law; Bowie Wu; Joyce Tang; Jonathan Cheung; Lau Kong; Koni Lui; Bob Cheung
- Theme music composer: Alan Cheung
- Opening theme: "The Warmth of Love" (愛的溫暖) by Edwin Siu
- Country of origin: Hong Kong S.A.R.
- Original language: Cantonese
- No. of episodes: 31

Production
- Executive producer: Catherine Tsang
- Producer: Dave Fong
- Production location: Hong Kong S.A.R.
- Editor: Ma Chun-wing
- Camera setup: Multi camera
- Running time: 45 minutes
- Production company: TVB

Original release
- Network: TVB Jade
- Release: 27 June – 31 July 2016

House of Spirits
- Traditional Chinese: 一屋老友記
- Simplified Chinese: 一屋老友记
- Cantonese Yale: Yātngūk Lóuhyáuhgei
- Literal meaning: "A House of Old Friends"
Transcriptions
Standard Mandarin
- Hanyu Pinyin: Yīwū Lǎoyǒujì
- Bopomofo: ㄧ ㄨ ㄌㄠˇㄧㄡˇㄐㄧˋ
Yue: Cantonese
- Yale Romanization: Yātngūk Lóuhyáuhgei
- Jyutping: Jat1nguk1 Lou5jau5gei3
- IPA: [jɐ́t̚.ŋók̚ lo̬u.jɐ̬u.kēi]

House of Spirits (Chinese: 一屋老友記; Cantonese Yale: Yātngūk Lóuhyáuhgei; literally "A House of Old Friends") is a 2016 Hong Kong television comedy, family, supernatural drama produced by Dave Fong for TVB, starring Bobby Au-yeung, Nancy Wu, Helena Law and Bowie Wu as the main cast. It premiered on Hong Kong's TVB Jade and Malaysia's Astro On Demand on June 27, 2016, airing Monday through Sunday during its 9:30-10:30 pm timeslot and concluding July 31, 2016 with a total of 31 episodes.

== Synopsis ==
Po Foon (Bobby Au-yeung) finds his heart-broken father Po Luk dead, while waiting for his grown children to come over for dinner. Foon makes a promise to fulfill his father's last wish of mending his bickering family together. As requested on Po Luk's will, all four of the Po siblings must live together in his rundown home for nine months, before they can sell it. At first, none of Foon's siblings, Po Yan (Joyce Tang), Anthony Po (Jonathan Cheung) and Po Yi (Bob Cheung) agree to live together, but after discovering the property's worth in the market, they all move in without hesitation.

Po Foon, the oldest of the four, is not respected by his younger siblings. He had walked out on the family during his youth, instead of contributing to his family when it was needed the most, he had decided to leave so he could seek his freedom and escape his father's abuse. The death of his father has finally made him realize the importance of unity and family, and makes him finally understand his father's words of "A bunch of chopsticks is stronger than one chopstick."

On the first day of moving into his father's home, Foon comes across a dusty antique umbrella and opens it in the balcony. As he turns to go back inside he sees an elderly couple suddenly inside the house watching television on his couch. They introduce themselves as Bak Wah (Bowie Wu) and Yi Lan (Helena Law), and claim that they live next door. However both Bak Wah and Yi Lan seem to not want to leave the Po home until Foon asks them to.

Foon then starts to notice something strange about the couple, as he and his niece Bianca seem to be the only two people who acknowledge their existence. The neighbors in the building tell Foon that the apartment the couple claim to live in has been vacant for many years, and that they do not know of such a couple in the building. However the Baks use an excuse, that they do not get along with the neighbors, as an explanation to Foon. After witnessing Bak Wah jump off the roof and then reappearing without a scratch, Foon realizes that the couple are indeed actually ghosts.

Meanwhile, Foon meets certified electrician Chu Chan-chan (Nancy Wu) when she approaches him in the middle of night after learning his building had a fire scare because of electrical problems. Foon wards Chan-chan off after thinking her estimated price for the repair work is too expensive, but she gets hired later by Yan who is also a former classmate of Chan-chan. When Foon tries to rid the Baks from his home they start playing tricks on him and soon Foon starts calling Chan-chan to do repair work as his thinks there are plumbing issues within his home.

Chan-chan's good deed to help Foon causes her to lose her job as she is forced to resign when she loses a huge client for the shop she works for. Due to a mean spirited former co-worker bad mouthing her she is unable to find employment elsewhere. However opportunity arises when a soon to retire shop owner is willing to sell his business to her. With the help of Yan's investment, Chan-chan becomes her own boss.

After Foon, who is a founder of a prestigious child learning center loses his job, he finds work at his friend's noodle shop, working the late shift. The noodle shop and Chan-chan's new shop happened to be right across from each other, because of this the two see each other everyday and besides bickering they also become closer.

When Foon realizes that the ghostly Baks cannot be rid, he forms a truce with them in order to co-habitat peacefully. After seeing that the Baks are friendly, peaceful ghost who will do no harm to the living, Foon and the Baks form a friendship. When the time comes that the Po home is to be sold, the Baks give in a helping hand.

== Cast ==
=== Po household ===
- Lau Kong as Po Luk (寶祿)

The Po sibling's deceased father. He left behind a will, which specified his children to live together in his home for nine months before they can offer the property up for sale. His facial expression changes on his death portrait according to deeds Foon has done for his siblings. During his lifetime he worked various jobs, such as rodent exterminator and rice noodle roller at a dim sum cafe in order to support his family. After his death his spirit possesses the body of an orange-haired cat that watches over and protects his family. The family names the cat "Fai Jie" (肥仔; literally "Fat Boy" in Cantonese)

- Bobby Au-yeung as Po Foon (寶歡)
  - Andrew Au as Teenage Po Foon (少年寶歡) - Ricco Ng as Young Po Foon (青年寶歡)

The oldest of the Po siblings. Foon is the principal of a prestigious children's learning center, and used to be the host of a popular children's television program. Foon left the family at a young age to pursue his freedom and get away from his father's abuse. This angered his younger siblings since they thought he was selfish and made all of them disrespect him as adults. He is often late to family events, but goes by the motto: "Better late than not showing up." Foon develops the ability to see their ghostly neighbors the Baks, after opening a dusty antique umbrella inside his father's home. After offending a powerful socialite tiger mom at the learning center he loses his job and later works the late shift at his friend Wong Bak-chun's noodle shop. Having much free time working the night shift, it reignites his interest in learning how to make rice noodle rolls according to his father's teachings years ago.

- Joyce Tang as Po Yan (寶欣)
  - Au Ming-miu as Teenage Po Yan (少年寶欣)

The second Po sibling and the only daughter of the family. Yan resents Foon for leaving the family behind when he was needed the most. Bitter, Yan constantly reminds her two younger siblings of how she had sacrificed her university scholarship to raise them. She is married to Mui Chiu, and they have a young daughter, Bianca. After a huge fight with her husband Mui Chiu, about finances she decided to invest into Chan-chan's electrical and plumbing shop.

- Tsui Wing as Mui Chiu (梅昭)

Yan's loving and understanding husband and Bianca's father. He works as a construction material factory director in New Territories, Mainland China and hardly gets the chance to see his wife and daughter when they move back to Hong Kong to live at the Po household. Not happy with his wife moving with their daughter back to Hong Kong without consulting him he tries to take their daughter back home to New Territories but decides not to when Bianca says she is happy at the Po home. Not happy being separated from his wife and daughter for nine months, he also moves into the Po household part-time. He is the voice of reason for his wife and always calms her down whenever she has a heated agreement with her siblings.

- Bianca Chan as Bianca Mui Siu-fei (梅小菲)

Yan and Mui Chiu's young daughter. After opening the dusty antique umbrella she is able see the Baks also. She has many extracurricular activities and depends on Po Yi to take her to her lessons. Her main activity is piano which she is taught by Liu Sing-san. After moving into the Po home she becomes extremely close with her uncle Po Foon and even stands up to her mother when Foon is kicked out of home.

- Jonathan Cheung as Anthony Po Yue (寶愉)
  - Yiub Cheng as Childhood Po Yue (童年寶愉)

The third Po sibling who works as an investment fund manager. He and his wife, Fiona, are newlyweds. They are both materialistic who like luxury brand items. After finding out Foon fraud their father's will he agrees to keep his secret when promised a share of Foon's cut of the home sale. Due to his poor upbringing, he is always paranoid of people looking down at him. He wants the fancier things in life in order to show he is better than the people that criticized him. When the investment company he works for gets in trouble he becomes the scapegoat and is fired. In order to cover for his losses and still be able to purchase his luxury flat, he secretly sells his father's apartment for a much lower price than the value and secretly keeps the profits for himself.

- Koni Lui as Fiona Yue Fa (余花)

Yue's newlywed wife. She is a shallow ditz, and has an obsession with luxury-branded items. She works as a part-time show model who thinks she is much better than the new much younger models. She agrees to move into her deceased father-in-law's home for nine months believing she will get half of her husband's share when they sell the place. She doesn't like to be called stupid because she is the least bright among her sisters. Her unreasonable, selfish and vain personality causes her to be at odds with Po Yan, who constantly points out her stupidity. She is also a spokesperson for a slimming tonic company. When she breaches her work contract by gaining weight, she goes as far as lying about being pregnant in order to save herself from being sued and also uses this lie to have the entire Po family slave over her.

- Bob Cheung as David Po Yi (寶怡; name homophone to British rocker "David Bowie")
  - Cyrus Ho as Childhood Po Yi (童年寶怡)

The youngest of the Po siblings, and a university student. He was living in school dorms prior to his father's death. He is a lazy slacker who sleeps all day instead of finding a job. He is interested in music and wants to be a musician; however, he suffers from stage fright. Due to being extremely picky about employment and always broke, Foon forces him to work with him during the late shift at Bak-chun's noodle shop

=== Baks ===
- Bowie Wu as Bak Wah (白樺)

Yi Lan's husband. He and his wife were 1940's and 50's movie stars. His successful movie career made him a heavy gambler. He died broke and lonely in his apartment with his fans having to pay for his funeral. During his lifetime he owned the entire building the Po's currently live at. He and his wife currently inhabit the Po 's secret storage room as a house ghost.

- Helena Law as Mrs. Bak - Yi Lan (白太-依蘭)

Bak Wah's wife. She and her husband were 1940's and 50's movie star. They currently inhabit the Po's secret storage room as a ghost. When the Po household is in shambles due to bickering, Lan takes it upon herself by entering a Po family member's body to do household chores.

- Chloe Nguyen as Bak Wai (白慧)

Bak Wah and Yi Lan's rebellious teenage daughter. Not wanting to live under her parents rules, she ran away from home in 1977 and became a prostitute to survive. The Baks have been searching for her ever since and even had Po Luk help them find her when he was alive. She is Chu Chan-chan's birth mother who gave her up to the orphanage. She died in 1996 from liver cancer

=== Friends Electrical & Plumbing ===
- Nancy Wu as Chu Chan-chan (朱燦燦)
  - Jacqueline Chan as Teenage Chu Chan-chan (少年朱燦燦)

A certified electrician. She is an orphan who was also Po Yan's high school classmate. When electrical and water problems arises at the Po household she becomes their daily handyman. Due to helping Foon she is forced to resign at Man Lung. Unable to find employment elsewhere she opens her own shop with the help of Yan. She suffers from insomnia and can only have a goodnight sleep when she eats a plate of Foon's homemade rice noodle roll, made with a specific rice flour brand. She highly admires Kwai Si-fuk because of a character he once played in a children's television show cheered her up at the orphanage.

- Calvin Chan as Cheung Tsan (張震)

Chu Chan-chan and Ling Bo's roommate who also works alongside the both of them. He and Ling Bo quit their job together at Man Lung due to being bullied by Kuen. They later work for Chan-chan when she opens her own shop. He has a huge crush on Chan-chan and becomes mad jealous whenever he sees Chan-chan and Foon getting close.

- Kelvin Yuen as Ling Bo (凌波)

Chu Chan-chan and Cheung Tsan's roommate who also works alongside the both of them. He owns the apartment that the three live in as he inherited it from his aunt. He and Cheung Tsan quit their job together at Man Lung due to being bullied by Kuen. They later work for Chan-chan when she opens her own shop.

=== Cameo appearance ===
- Chow Chung as Chow Chung (周驄; Character shares the same name as the actor that portrays him)

A fictional portrayal of actor Chow Chung portray by Chow himself. A 1940's and 50's movie star who was acquainted with Yi Lan. He liked Yi Lan and the two were rumored in an affair. He was very much in love with Yi Lan, even naming his cat after her. However it was unrequited love as she only saw him as a friend.

- Angelina Lo as Sik Giu (飾嬌)

Mui Chiu's mother, Po Yan's mother in-law and Bianca's paternal grandmother. She puts on a nice and friendly persona when she is in the company of others but becomes mean and judgmental when she is alone with Po Yan. Missing her granddaughter she secretly sneaks to Hong Kong and talks the Po family besides Yan into letting her live at the Po home for awhile. She also thinks Po Yan is having an affair since she caught Yan socializing with a man.

- Suet Nei as Kam Siu Mo-ching (甘瀟慕晶)
  - Lee Yee-man as Young Kam Siu Mo-ching (青年甘瀟慕晶)

Kam Cha-lei's mother. Foon meets her who he assumes is a customer at the food stall he works at. She worries about her son and tries to pass that message to Foon but he does not realize that she is actually a ghost.

- Joe Tay as Kam Cha-lei (甘查理)

A shady real-estate developer who shortchanges sellers on payment once he has obtained their property and uses triad threat tactics to force people into selling their homes. He develops a liking to Po Yan because she helped defuse an argument between him and an angered home seller.

- Anderson Junior as Michael

Abby's husband. The owner of the weight loss company that Fiona is the spokesperson for. When Fiona gains weight he threatens to sue her for every amount of weight she has gained.

- Celine Ma as Suet (雪姐)

A food critic who ventured into the shopping arcade and had a taste of Foon's homemade rice noodle rolls, which she enjoyed and highly praised.

- Henry Yu as Professor Tin (田教授)

A teaching professor who wants to hire Foon to manage a new learning center he is opening in Shanghai.

- KK Cheung as KK Cheung Kwok-keung (張國強; Character shares the same name as the actor that portrays him)

A fictional portrayal of actor KK Cheung portray by Cheung himself. An actor who was a former co-star of Foon's children's television program. He helps Foon and Chan-chan into TVB to look for actor Chow Chung.

- Jeannie Chan as Jeannie

A participant in a music competition that Po Yi is also participating in.

=== Extended cast ===
- Max Cheung as Kwai Si-fuk (季思福)
  - Alex Yeung as Young Kwai Si-fuk (青年季思福)

Po Foon's friend and Chief Executive Officer at the learning center Foon works at. He was also Foon's co-star in a children's television program and was quite chubby when he was younger. For money he is willing to move a child to an advance course even if the child in not at that level. He is nicknamed "Si Futt Guai" (屎忽鬼; Hong Kong slang for "homosexual", equivalent to "fudge packer" in English) because it is homophone to his name. He meets Chan-chan when Foon refers her to him for a contractor job to his new learning center. He develops a liking to Chan-chan seeing how amazing she is at her job. Chan-chan calls him by the nickname "Seafood" (which the English word is a homophone to the pronunciation of his name).

- Moon Lau as Liu Sing-san (呂星晨)

Bianca's piano teacher. Po Yi has a crush on her after meeting her when he was food delivering to her work place.

- Jay Fung as Jay Fung (馮允謙; Character shares the same name as the actor that portrays him)

A fictional portrayal of the actor that plays the character. A singer and songwriter that Po Yi helps in setting up the performance stage. He is also Liu Sing-san's boyfriend.

- Willie Wai as Wong Bak-chun (黃百川)
  - Leo Kwan as Young Wong Bak-chun (青年黃百川)

Po Foon's friend. He owns a small noodle soup shop and practices Taoism on the side since he is descended from a long line of Taoist priest. When Foon finds out that Mr. and Mrs. Bak are ghosts he calls for his help, however he is not very skilled in Taoist. With his wife forcing him to close shop early after having their new child he hires Foon to work the late shift at his noodle shop.

- Fanny Lee as Au Yuk-han (歐玉嫻)

Wong Bak-chun's very strict wife. She doesn't like her husband practicing Taoist rituals. The noodle shop that her husband manages was left to them by her father. After giving birth to her second child she forces her husband to close the noodle shop earlier in order to be home to help.

- Mak Ka-lun as Ming (明仔)

Wong Bak-chun's employee at the noodle shop. He is a unproductive employee as he is always taking sick days and vacations.

- Yu Chi-ming as Ho Gwai (何貴)

An elderly old man that lives in the rundown building the Po siblings live at. He suffers from dementia and sometimes think he is a small child. He thinks Po Yi is a triad gang member because he is a youngster.

- Alex Yung as Yin (賢)

Ho Gwai's grandson that lives with him. Due to his grandfather's dementia he has to explain and apologize to the Po family for his grandfather's actions. He is in charge of taking care of his grandfather, but often neglects him by leaving him at home and alone.

- Derek Wong as Andy

Fiona's suffering manager who has to put up with her antics. He is always reminding Fiona to lose weight in order to meet the requirements of her diet company contract.

- Alycia Chan as Abby

Michael's wife. Seeing that she is pregnant, Fiona lies that she is also pregnant to gain sympathy from her.

- Chan Wing-chun as Uncle Ken (堅叔)

Owner of Man Lung Electrical & Plumbing and Chu Chan-chan's boss who also taught her about electrical and plumbing. Due to loss of a huge client he is forced to let Chan-chan go because of his nephew Kuen's unsympathetic opinion towards Chan-chan.

- Kelvin Lee as Kuen (權)

Uncle Ken's nephew who runs the front of the shop for him. He is lazy and inconsiderate to Chan-chan, Cheung Tsan, and Ling Bo, as he likes to bad mouth them to his uncle.

- Carat Cheung as Joanne Chin Cho-kwan (錢祖君)

Po Foon's former girlfriend who also use to work at the children's learning center. She has borrowed a huge amount of money from Foon but does not plan to pay it back. In order to constantly swindle Foon out of money she uses guilt by pretending to be crippled in the leg due to a car accident Foon caused.

- June Ng as Tracy

The administrative secretary that works at Foon and Kwai Si-fuk's leaning center. She has a crush on Si-fuk and is disappointed when she sees him choosing Chan-chan to take to a function.

- Aliya Fan as Mrs. Tou (陶太)

A rich socialite whose young son attends Foon's prestigious learning center. When Foon offends her by labeling her as a tiger mom she uses her money and connections to get him fired.

- Willie Lau as Mr. Tou (陶生)

Mrs. Tou's much older husband who is also a rich tycoon. When Foon offends his wife, he invest heavily into the learning center Foon co-founded in order to become a major shareholder to oust Foon.

- Joey Mak as Chiu Fong-fong (崔芳芳)

A girl that grew up together with Chan-chan at the orphanage. She is materialistic and died when her handbag was snatched from her during a robbery. She haunts Chan-chan at the shopping arcade but Foon is the only one that can see her due to sniffing dust from her stolen handbag.

- Choi Kwok-Hing as Mr. Dung (鄧叔)

Owner of a Chinese sweet shop. He was a fan of Bak Wah and Yi Lan and knows of their background when they were alive.

- Raymond Chiu as Dickson

Fiona's cocky ex-boyfriend and Anthony's nemesis and former colleague. He is an arrogant playboy who likes to insult both Fiona and Anthony, whenever he sees them as he sees himself better than the two. He is later outed by a tabloid news show that he has AIDS due to his womanizing.

- Andy Lau Tin-lung as Jason

Dickson's business partner. When Anthony loses his job and is in need of money he sells the Po family home to him at a much lesser price than its actual worth.

- Billy Cheung as Hugo

Anthony's boss and later former boss. When investments in his company crashes, he uses Anthony as a scapegoat and also fires him.

- Man Yeung as Peter

Kam Cha-lei's personal assistant.

- Kitty Lau as Granny Yeung (楊婆婆)

An elderly lady living in the same building as the Po family. Kam Cha-lei's henchman uses threat tactics to try to force her into selling her home.

== Development and production ==
- The costume fitting ceremony was held on November 13, 2015, 12:30 pm at Tseung Kwan O TVB City Studio One.
- The blessing ceremony was held on December 15, 2015, 2:00 pm at Tseung Kwan O TVB City Studio sixteen.
- Filming took place from November 2015 till March 2016, entirely on location in Hong Kong.
- A promo image of House of Spirits was featured in TVB's 2016 calendar for the month of July.

== Viewership ratings ==
Timeslot (HKT)	#	Day(s)	Week	Episode(s)	Average points	Peaking points
Mon - Sun (9:30-10:30 pm); 21:30–22:30	1	Mon - Fri	27 Jun - 01 Jul 2016	1 — 5	25	29
Mon - Sun (9:30-10:30 pm); 21:30–22:30	1	Sat	02 Jul 2016	6	--	--
Mon - Sun (9:30-10:30 pm); 21:30–22:30	2	Mon - Fri	04 - 08 Jul 2016	7 — 11	27	30
Mon - Sun (9:30-10:30 pm); 21:30–22:30	2	Sat	09 Jul 2016	12	--	--
Mon - Sun (9:30-10:30 pm); 21:30–22:30	2	Sun	10 Jul 2016	13	--	--
Mon - Sun (9:30-10:30 pm); 21:30–22:30	3	Mon - Fri	11 - 15 Jul 2016	14 — 18	28	30
Mon - Sun (9:30-10:30 pm); 21:30–22:30	3	Sat	16 Jul 2016	19	--	--
Mon - Sun (9:30-10:30 pm); 21:30–22:30	4	Mon - Fri	18 - 22 Jul 2016	20 — 24	29	31
Mon - Sun (9:30-10:30 pm); 21:30–22:30	4	Sun	24 Jul 2016	25	--	--
Mon - Sun (9:30-10:30 pm); 21:30–22:30	5	Mon - Fri	25 - 29 Jul 2016	26 — 30	29	30
Mon - Sun (9:30-10:30 pm); 21:30–22:30	5	Sun	31 Jul 2016	31	30	32
Total average					27	32

July 3, 2016: No episode broadcast due to airing of Presumed Accidents final episodes.
July 17, 2016: No episode broadcast due to airing Sunday Stage Fight.
July 23, 2016: No episode broadcast due to airing TVB Most Popular TV Commercial Awards 2016 .
July 30, 2016: No episode broadcast due to airing Big Boys Club.

== Awards and nominations ==
Year	Ceremony	Category	Nominee	Result
2016	StarHub TVB Awards	My Favourite TVB Drama	House of Spirits	Nominated
2016	StarHub TVB Awards	My Favourite TVB Actor	Bobby Au-yeung	Nominated
2016	StarHub TVB Awards	My Favourite TVB Supporting Actress	Joyce Tang	Nominated
2016	StarHub TVB Awards	My Favourite TVB Supporting Actress	Koni Lui	Nominated
2016	StarHub TVB Awards	My Favourite TVB Supporting Actor	Jonathan Cheung	Nominated
2016	StarHub TVB Awards	My Favourite TVB Female TV Character	Joyce Tang	Nominated
2016	StarHub TVB Awards	My Favourite TVB Male TV Character	Bobby Au-yeung	Won
2016	StarHub TVB Awards	My Favourite Onscreen Couple	Bobby Au Yeung & Nancy Wu	Nominated
2016	StarHub TVB Awards	My Favourite TVB Theme Song	"The Warmth of Love" (愛的溫暖) by Edwin Siu	Nominated
2016	TVB Star Awards Malaysia	My Favourite TVB Drama Series	House of Spirits	Nominated
2016	TVB Star Awards Malaysia	My Favourite TVB Actor in a Leading Role	Bobby Au-yeung	Nominated
2016	TVB Star Awards Malaysia	My Favourite TVB Actress in a Supporting Role	Joyce Tang	Won
2016	TVB Star Awards Malaysia	My Favourite TVB Actress in a Supporting Role	Koni Lui	Nominated
2016	TVB Star Awards Malaysia	My Favourite TVB Most Improved Actor	Jonathan Cheung	Won
2016	TVB Star Awards Malaysia	My Favourite Top 16 TVB Drama Characters	Bobby Au-yeung	Won
2016	TVB Star Awards Malaysia	My Favourite Top 16 TVB Drama Characters	Joyce Tang	Won
2016	TVB Star Awards Malaysia	My Favourite Top 16 TVB Drama Characters	Jonathan Cheung	Nominated
2016	TVB Star Awards Malaysia	My Favourite Top 16 TVB Drama Characters	Koni Lui	Won
2016	TVB Star Awards Malaysia	My Favourite Top 16 TVB Drama Characters	Bowie Wu	Nominated
2016	TVB Star Awards Malaysia	My Favourite Top 16 TVB Drama Characters	Helena Law	Nominated
2017	Asian Television Awards	Best Comedy Performance By An Actor/Actress	Bobby Au Yeung	Won

== International broadcast ==
- Malaysia - 8TV (Malaysia) - 24 July 2018 – 4 September 2018: 7:00 pm – 8:00 pm
