= List of TVB series (2001) =

Entertainment

This is a list of series released by or aired on TVB Jade Channel in 2001.

== First line series ==
These dramas aired in Hong Kong from 8:30 to 9:30 pm, Monday to Friday on TVB.

Airing date	English title (Chinese title)	Number of episodes	Main cast	Theme song (T) Sub-theme song (ST)	Genre	Notes	Official website
1 Jan- 2 Feb	Screen Play 娛樂反斗星	25	Bobby Au Yeung, Sheren Tang, Michael Tse, May Kwong, Kingdom Yuen	T: "愚樂一週" (Edmond Leung)	Modern drama	Released overseas on October 16, 2000. Copyright notice: 2000.	Official website
5 Feb- 6 Apr	Reaching Out 美麗人生	45	Gordon Lam, Kenix Kwok, Benny Chan, Michelle Ye, Sammul Chan, Nicola Cheung	T: "缺陷美" (Andy Lau)	Modern drama	Overseas version 50 episodes Released overseas on November 20, 2000. Copyright notice: 2000.	Official website
9 Apr- 26 May	The Heaven Sword and Dragon Saber 倚天屠龍記	37	Lawrence Ng, Gigi Lai, Charmaine Sheh, Joyce Tang, Cherie Chan, Damian Lau, Michelle Yim, Eddie Cheung	T: "風起雲湧" (Lawrence Ng); ST: "浮生若夢" (Liz Kong)	Costume action	Overseas version 42 episodes Released overseas on May 29, 2000. Copyright notice: 2000.	Official website
28 May- 20 Jul	Romance in the Rain 情深深雨濛濛	40	Su You Peng, Zhao Wei, Ruby Lin, Leo Ku		Modern drama	Taiwanese series	
23 Jul- 14 Sep	Gods of Honour 封神榜	40	Benny Chan, Irene Wan, Chin Kar Lok, Michelle Ye, Kingdom Yuen, Yuen Wah	T: "封神" (Benny Chan & Rain Lau)	Costume action		Official website
17 Sep- 12 Oct	In the Realm of Success 公私戀事多	20	Steven Ma, Nadia Chan, Michael Tong, Claire Yiu	T: "重視你" (Steven Ma); ST: "我最關心" (Steven Ma)	Modern drama	Released overseas on March 12, 2001.	Official website
15 Oct- 7 Dec	A Step into the Past 尋秦記	40	Louis Koo, Jessica Hsuan, Sonija Kwok, Raymond Lam, Kwong Wah, Joyce Tang	T: "天命最高" (Louis Koo); ST: "我願愛" (Louis Koo)	Costume drama	Grand production	Official website
10 Dec- 25 Jan 2002	Chor Lau Heung 2001 新楚留香	35	Richie Ren, Ruby Lin, Gigi Lai, Kristy Yang, Wayne Lai, Dicky Cheung, Monica Chan, Ng Man Tat, Ekin Cheng, Daniel Chan	T: "花太香" (Richie Ren)	Costume drama	Co-production with Taiwan.	Official website

== Second line series ==
These dramas aired in Hong Kong from 9:30 to 10:30 pm, Monday to Friday on TVB.

Airing date	English title (Chinese title)	Number of episodes	Main cast	Theme song (T) Sub-theme song (ST)	Genre	Notes	Official website
15 Jan- 9 Feb	Colourful Life 錦繡良緣	20	Frankie Lam, Annie Man, Cutie Mui, Ronald Cheng, Florence Kwok, Louisa So	T: "染布人生" (Ronald Cheng)	Costume drama	Copyright notice: 2000 (Eps. 1–10), 2001 (Eps. 11–20).	Official website
12 Feb- 6 Apr	The Duke of Mount Deer 小寶與康熙	40	Dicky Cheung, Patrick Tam, Ruby Lin, Athena Chu, Monica Chan	T: "你愛我像誰" (Dicky Cheung)	Costume drama	Co-production with Taiwan. Released overseas on August 21, 2000. Copyright notice: 2000.	Official website
9 Apr- 1 Jun	On the Track or Off 勇往直前	40	Steven Ma, Ada Choi, Bondy Chiu, Frankie Lam, Bill Chan	T: "想飛" (Steven Ma)	Modern drama		Official website
4 Jun- 6 Jul	A Taste of Love 美味情緣	25	Lawrence Ng, Flora Chan, Raymond Lam, Miriam Yeung, Joyce Tang, Joe Ma	T: "美味情緣" (Miriam Yeung); ST: "快樂與哀愁" (Miriam Yeung)	Modern drama	Released overseas on October 16, 2000. Copyright notice: 2000.	Official website
9 Jul- 18 Aug	Armed Reaction III 陀槍師姐III	32	Bobby Au Yeung, Joyce Tang, Marco Ngai, Ada Choi	T: "人間定格" (Sammi Cheng)	Modern action	Sequel to 2000's Armed Reaction II. Prequel to 2004's Armed Reaction IV.	Official website
20 Aug- Sep 13	Seven Sisters 七姊妹	26	Gallen Lo, Charmaine Sheh, Kwong Wah, Anne Heung, Annie Man	T: "愛多錯多" (Gallen Lo & Bondy Chiu); ST: "心中有數" (Gallen Lo); ST: "半生緣" (Kwong Wah)	Costume drama		Official website
24 Sep- 26 Oct	The Awakening Story 婚前昏後	25	Liza Wang, Damian Lau, Maggie Cheung, Joe Ma, Louisa So, Tavia Yeung, Patrick Tang	T: "給自己的情書" (Faye Wong)	Modern drama		Official website
29 Oct- 22 Dec	Country Spirit 酒是故鄉醇	42	Gordon Lam, Charmaine Sheh, Sheren Tang, Joe Ma, Paul Chun	T: "醇酒醉影" (Jacky Cheung & Kit Chan)	Period drama		Official website
24 Dec- 18 Jan 2002	Law Enforcers 勇探實錄	20	Roger Kwok, Nick Cheung, Fennie Yuen, Benz Hui	T: "無常" (Nick Cheung)	Modern drama	Released overseas on June 4, 2001.	Official website

== Third line series ==
These dramas aired in Hong Kong from 10:40 to 11:10 pm, Monday to Friday on TVB.

Airing date	English title (Chinese title)	Number of episodes	Main cast	Theme song (T) Sub-theme song (ST)	Genre	Notes	Official website
13 Nov 2000- 6 Apr	Broadcast Life; FM701	102	Sheila Chan, Cheung Tat Ming, Vincent Kuk, Elle Choi	T: "香港一定得" (Cheung Tat Ming)	Modern sitcom		Official website
9 Apr- 1 Jun	Kung Fu Master from Guangdong 南龍北鳳	20	Felix Wong, Jade Leung, Jay Lau, Derek Kok	T: "南龍北鳳" (Wakin Chau & Karen Mok)	Costume action	Released overseas on August 9, 1999. Copyright notice: 1999. First co-produced drama with China.	Official website
4 Jun- 14 Sep	Da Zhai Men 大宅門	74	Guo Bao Chang		Modern drama	China series	
17 Sep- 28 Dec 2002	Virtues of Harmony 皆大歡喜	322	Nancy Sit, Frankie Lam, Bernice Liu, Michael Tse, Cutie Mui, Kingdom Yuen, Bondy Chiu, Joyce Chen, Louis Yuen, Stephanie Che, Lau Dan, Hawick Lau	T: "皆大歡喜" (Nancy Sit); ST: "心事有誰知" (Nancy Sit)	Costume sitcom	Indirect prequel to 2003's Virtues of Harmony II.	Official website

== Other series ==
Airing date	English title (Chinese title)	Number of episodes	Main cast	Theme song (T) Sub-theme song (ST)	Genre	Notes	Official website
10 Feb- 10 Mar	The ICAC Investigators 2000 廉政追擊	5	Damian Lau, Melissa Ng, Mark Lui, Melvin Wong, Joe Ma, Hawick Lau, Raymond Lam		Modern suspense	TVB production partnering with ICAC.	Official website
26 Mar- 15 Jun	Dragon Hall 龍堂	60	Chang Feng Yi, Carrie Ng, Jordan Chan, Bondy Chiu		Modern drama	China series	
9 Jul	Smart Kid 機靈小子	30	Dicky Cheung, Li Bing Bing, Law Ka Ying, He Mei Tian		Costume drama	China series	

== Warehoused series ==
These dramas were released overseas and have not broadcast on TVB Jade Channel.

Oversea released date	English title (Chinese title)	Number of episodes	Main cast	Theme song (T) Sub-theme song (ST)	Genre	Notes	Official website
22 Jan- 16 Feb	Hope For Sale 街市的童話	20	Gallen Lo, Christine Ng	T: "腹語" (Gallen Lo)	Modern drama		
6 Aug- 31 Aug	At Point Blank 婚姻乏術	20	Gallen Lo, Myolie Wu	T: "我有時怕傾訴" (Gallen Lo)	Modern drama		
22 Oct- 16 Nov	The Stamp of Love 肥婆奶奶扭計媳	20	Lydia Shum, Anne Heung, Kwong Wah	T: "心語" (Kwong Wah)	Modern drama		Official website
