= List of TVB series (2000) =

This is a list of series released by or aired on TVB Jade Channel in 2000.

== First line series ==
These dramas aired in Hong Kong from 8:30 to 9:30 pm, Monday to Friday on TVB.

Airing date	English title (Chinese title)	Number of episodes	Main cast	Theme song (T) Sub-theme song (ST)	Genre	Notes	Official website
3 Jan- 29 Jan	Ups and Downs 無業樓民	21	Damian Lau, Christine Ng, Kwong Wah, Timmy Hung, Nicola Cheung	T: "不可看少我" (Kwong Wah)	Modern drama		Official website
31 Jan- 18 Feb	Aiming High 撻出愛火花	15	Nicholas Tse, Nicola Cheung, Yuen Wah, Fiona Leung, Hawick Lau	T: "天空這麼大" (Nicholas Tse)	Modern drama	Overseas version 20 episodes Released overseas on September 28, 1998. Copyright notice: 1998.	Official website
21 Feb- 17 Mar	The Legend of Lady Yang 楊貴妃	20	Kwong Wah, Anne Heung, Melissa Ng, Fiona Yuen, Florence Kwok	T: "男兒再不負深情" (Amanda Lee)	Costume drama	Released overseas on January 31, 2000. Copyright notice: 1999.	Official website
22 May- 9 Jun	Time Off 生命有Take 2 (or 明天不一樣)	15	Felix Wong, Monica Chan, Mark Kwok, Charmaine Sheh, Michael Tse	T: "有此一朝" (Andy Hui); ST: "愛你" (Andy Hui)	Modern drama	Overseas version 20 episodes Released overseas on December 21, 1998. Copyright notice: 1998.	Official website
10 Jul- 4 Aug	Lost in Love 大囍之家	20	Jackie Lui, Paul Chun, Mariane Chan, Christine Ng, Fennie Yuen, Louisa So	T: "固定伴侶" (Flora Chan & William So)	Modern drama	Released overseas on July 3, 2000.	Official website
7 Aug- 15 Oct	The Legendary Four Aces 金裝四大才子	52	Bobby Au Yeung, Nick Cheung, Gordon Lam, Marco Ngai, Esther Kwan, Nadia Chan, Annie Man, Yvonne Yung	T: "君子好逑" (Bobby Au Yeung, Nick Cheung, Gordon Lam, Marco Ngai, Esther Kwan, Nadia Chan, Annie Man, & Yvonne Yung); ST: "愛沒太多理由" (Nick Cheung & Esther Kwan)	Costume drama		Official website
20 Nov- 29 Dec	Crimson Sabre 碧血劍	30	Gordon Lam, Charmaine Sheh, Kwong Wah, Melissa Ng, Sara Au, Emily Kwan	T: "明明深愛著你" (Hacken Lee); ST: "熱愛終極" (Kwong Wah)	Costume action	Overseas version 35 episodes Released overseas on August 2000. Copyright notice: 1999 (Eps. 1-12), 2000 (Eps. 13-35).	Official website

== Second line series ==
These dramas aired in Hong Kong from 9:35 to 10:35 pm, Monday to Friday on TVB.

Airing date	English title (Chinese title)	Number of episodes	Main cast	Theme song (T) Sub-theme song (ST)	Genre	Notes	Official website
17 Jan- 11 Feb	When Dreams Come True 夢想成真	20	Jessica Hsuan, Jackie Lui, David Lui, Cutie Mui	T: "夢想成真" (David Lui)	Modern drama		
14 Feb- 10 Mar	The Sky is the Limit 緣份無邊界	20	Bowie Lam, Maggie Cheung, Ronald Cheng, Joyce Koi	T: "緣份無邊界" (Ronald Cheng)	Modern drama	Released overseas on December 13, 1999. Copyright notice: 1999.	
13 Mar- 26 May	At the Threshold of an Era II 創世紀II天地有情	55	Gallen Lo, Louis Koo, Kenix Kwok, Roger Kwok, Ada Choi, Liza Wang, Paul Chun, Flora Chan, Maggie Siu, Nicky Wu, Joe Ma	T: "天地有情" (Gallen Lo); ST: "創造晴天" (Gallen Lo)	Modern drama	Sequel to 1999's At the Threshold of an Era.	Official website
29 May- 8 Jul	Armed Reaction II 陀槍師姐II	32	Bobby Au Yeung, Esther Kwan, Joyce Tang, Marco Ngai	T: "另類男女" (Sammi Cheng)	Modern action	Sequel to 1998's Armed Reaction. Prequel to 2001's Armed Reaction III. Released overseas on February 8, 2000. Copyright notice: 1999.	Official website
10 Jul- 4 Aug	Return of the Cuckoo 十月初五的月光 (or 澳門街)	20	Julian Cheung, Charmaine Sheh, Nancy Sit, Steven Ma, Michael Tong	T: "祝君好" (Julian Cheung)	Modern drama		Official website
7 Aug- 2 Sept	Street Fighters 廟街·媽·兄弟	22	Hacken Lee, Edmond Leung, Gigi Wong, Michelle Ye, Tavia Yeung	T: "再一次想您" (Hacken Lee); ST: "寫我深情" (Hacken Lee)	Modern drama	Released overseas on July 20, 2000.	Official website
4 Sep- 14 Oct	A Matter of Customs 雷霆第一關	32	Liza Wang, Wong He, Jessica Hsuan, Danny Lee	T: "天網" (Eason Chan)	Modern drama		Official website
16 Oct- 17 Nov	The Green Hope 新鮮人	25	Bowie Lam, Yoyo Mung, Stephen Fung, Joey Yung, Melissa Ng, Cathy Chui	T: "新鮮人" (Stephen Fung); ST: "何苦" (Joey Yung); ST: "撈針" (Joey Yung)	Modern drama	Released overseas on May 22, 2000.	Official website
20 Nov- 12 Jan 2001	Healing Hands II 妙手仁心II	40	Lawrence Ng, Bowie Lam, Ada Choi, Flora Chan, Yoyo Mung, Moses Chan, Maggie Siu, Kit Chan Raymond Cho, Steven Ma	T: "不知不覺" (Bowie Lam & Kit Chan); T: "愛不出口" (Bowie Lam)	Modern drama	Sequel to 1998's Healing Hands. Prequel to 2005's Healing Hands III. Copyright notice: 2000 (Eps. 1-38), 2001 (Eps. 39-40).	Official website

== Third line series ==
These dramas aired in Hong Kong from 10:35 to 11:05 pm, Monday to Friday on TVB.

Airing date	English title (Chinese title)	Number of episodes	Main cast	Theme song (T) Sub-theme song (ST)	Genre	Notes	Official website
21 Feb- 7 Jul	War of the Genders 男親女愛	100	Carol Cheng, Dayo Wong, Kingdom Yuen, Patrick Tang, Kitty Yuen	T: "藍天" (Dayo Wong)	Modern sitcom		Official website
13 Nov- 6 Apr 2001	Broadcast Life; FM701	102	Sheila Chan, Cheung Tat Ming, Vincent Kuk, Elle Choi	T: "香港一定得" (Cheung Tat Ming)	Modern sitcom		Official website

== Other series ==
Airing date	English title (Chinese title)	Number of episodes	Main cast	Theme song (T) Sub-theme song (ST)	Genre	Notes	Official website
12 Feb- 22 Apr	The Threat of Love; Loving You 我愛你	10	Nancy Sit, Lawrence Ng, Sheren Tang		Modern drama	TVB mini-series Indirect prequel to 2003's The Threat of Love II.	
14 Aug- 8 Sep	Incurable Traits 醫神華佗	20	Frankie Lam, Felix Wong, Christine Ng, Elvina Kong	T: "雨一直下" (Phil Chang)	Costume drama	Released overseas on February 21, 2000.	Official website
2 Oct- 27 Oct	The Kung Fu Master 京城教一	20	Yuen Wah, Marco Ngai, Derek Kok, Michael Tong, Jade Leung	T: "拳傾天下" (Leo Ku)	Costume drama	Released overseas on March 20, 2000.	Official website
