= List of TVB series (2004) =

This is a list of series released by TVB in 2004.

== Top ten drama series in ratings ==
The following is a list of the highest-rated drama series released by TVB in 2004. The list includes premiere week and final week ratings.

Highest-rated drama series of 2004
Rank	English title	Chinese title	Average	Peak	Premiere	Final
1	To Catch the Uncatchable	棟篤神探	33	39	31	35
2	War and Beauty	金枝慾孽	32	44	30	33
3	Shine On You	青出於藍	30	36	30	32
4	To Get Unstuck in Time	隔世追兇	30	36	29	32
5	Armed Reaction IV	陀槍師姐IV	30	35	29	31
6	The Conqueror's Story	楚漢驕雄	30	35	27	31
7	Lady Fan	烽火奇遇結良緣	29	36	27	32
8	To Love with No Regrets	足秤老婆八両夫	29	33	29	29
9	Twin of Brothers	大唐雙龍傳	29	37	28	29
10	A Handful of Love	一屋兩家三姓人	28	38	27	30

== First line series ==
These dramas aired in Hong Kong from 8:00 to 9:00 pm, Monday to Friday on TVB.

Airing date	English title (Chinese title)	Number of episodes	Main cast	Theme song (T) Sub-theme song (ST)	Genre	Notes	Official website
15 Dec 2003- 6 Feb 2004	The Bronze Teeth II 鐵齒銅牙紀曉嵐 II	40	Zhang Guo Li, Zhang Tielin, Yuan Li		Costume action	China series Prequel to 2002's The Bronze Teeth. Sequel to 2006's The Bronze Teeth III.	
9 Feb- 5 Mar	Lady Fan 烽火奇遇結良緣	20	Jessica Hsuan, Joe Ma, Cindy Au, Cherie Kong	T: "風吹不走笑容" (Candy Lo)	Costume action	Copyright notice: 2003.	Official website
8 Mar- 24 Apr	Blade Heart 血薦軒轅	37	Adam Cheng, Liza Wang, Raymond Lam, Shirley Yeung, Yeung Suet, Mimi Lo	T: "亂" (Adam Cheng); ST: "問天" (Adam Cheng & Liza Wang); ST: "情人酒" (Adam Cheng & Liza Wang)	Costume action	Grand production Copyright notice: 2003.	Official website
26 Apr- 21 May	Dream of Colours 下一站彩虹	20	Myolie Wu, Melissa Ng, Gardner Tse, Kenneth Ma, Sharon Chan, Rain Li	T: "我在橋上看風景" (Rain Li)	Modern drama	Copyright notice: 2003.	Official website
24 May- 18 Jun	To Love With No Regrets 足秤老婆八両夫	20	Bosco Wong, Amy Kwok, Evergreen Mak, Annie Man, Wayne Lai	T: "雨過天青" (Angela Pang)	Costume drama	Released overseas on March 1, 2004. Copyright notice: 2003.	Official website
21 Jun- 16 Jul	A Handful of Love 一屋兩家三姓人	20	Jessica Hsuan, Joe Ma, Don Li	T: "打氣" (Don Li)	Modern drama		Official website
19 Jul- 12 Sep	Twin of Brothers 大唐雙龍傳	42	Raymond Lam, Ron Ng, Tavia Yeung, Leila Tong, Nancy Wu, Christine Ng, Derek Kok	T: "雙子龍" (Raymond Lam)	Costume action		Official website
13 Sep- 22 Oct	Shine On You 青出於藍	30	Bobby Au Yeung, Kenix Kwok, Michael Tao, Shirley Yeung, Paul Chun	T: "開學禮" (Hacken Lee); ST: "負負得正" (Chiu Chung Yu)	Modern drama	Copyright notice: 2003 (Eps. 1–5 & 22-24), 2004 (Eps. 6-21 & 25-30).	Official website
25 Oct- 4 Dec	The Conqueror's Story 楚漢驕雄	30	Adam Cheng, Maggie Cheung, Kwong Wah, Melissa Ng, Wayne Lai	T: "絕世雄才" (Adam Cheng); ST: "絕世雄才" (Kwong Wah & Kitman Mak)	Costume action	Anniversary series	Official website
6 Dec 2004- 9 Jan 2005	Kung Fu Soccer 功夫足球	25	Dicky Cheung, Joey Yung, Anthony Wong, Sandra Ng, Bowie Lam	T: "足球小將" (Dicky Cheung); ST: "貪慕虛榮" (Joey Yung)	Modern drama	China series	Official website

== Second line series ==
These dramas aired in Hong Kong from 9:00 to 9:30 pm, Monday to Friday on TVB.

Airing date	English title (Chinese title)	Number of episodes	Main cast	Theme song (T) Sub-theme song (ST)	Genre	Notes	Official website
5 May 2003- 22 Jan 2005	Virtues of Harmony II 皆大歡喜(時裝版)	443	Nancy Sit, Frankie Lam, Bernice Liu, Michael Tse, Cutie Mui, Kingdom Yuen, Bondy Chiu, Joyce Chen, Louis Yuen, Stephanie Che, Lau Dan, Hawick Lau, Steven Ma, Linda Chung	T: "皆大歡喜" (Nancy Sit); ST: "寸草心" (Nancy Sit)	Modern sitcom	Indirect sequel to 2001's Virtues of Harmony.	Official website

== Third line series ==
These dramas aired in Hong Kong from 10:05 to 11:05 pm (9:30 to 10:30 pm from 10 April onwards), Monday to Friday on TVB.

Airing date	English title (Chinese title)	Number of episodes	Main cast	Theme song (T) Sub-theme song (ST)	Genre	Notes	Official website
19 Jan- 13 Feb	The Vigilantes in Masks 怪俠一枝梅	20	Deric Wan, Tavia Yeung, Eddie Kwan, Sammul Chan	T: "老死" (William So & Eddie Ng)	Costume action	Released overseas on December 15, 2003. Copyright notice: 2003.	Official website
16 Feb- 9 Apr	Armed Reaction IV 陀槍師姐IV	40	Bobby Au Yeung, Ada Choi, Joyce Tang, Marco Ngai, Frankie Lam, Yoyo Mung, Ha Yu	T: "超速駕駛" (Sammi Cheng); ST: "落錯車" (Sammi Cheng)	Modern action	Sequel to 2001's Armed Reaction III. Released overseas on August 25, 2003. Copyright notice: 2003.	Official website
12 Apr- 21 May	Hard Fate 翡翠戀曲	30	Flora Chan, Damian Lau, Kevin Cheng, Niki Chow, Michelle Ye, Stephen Au, Michael Tong		Modern drama	Released overseas on March 29, 2004. Copyright notice: 2003.	Official website
24 May- 18 Jun	Angels of Mission 無名天使3D	20	Charmaine Sheh, Sonija Kwok, Shirley Yeung, Patrick Tam, Timmy Hung		Modern action	Released overseas on February 2, 2004. Copyright notice: 2003.	Official website
21 Jun- 17 Jul	To Get Unstuck In Time 隔世追兇	22	Roger Kwok, Flora Chan, Benz Hui, Kiki Sheung, Patrick Tang, Cherie Kong	T: "恍如隔世" (Patrick Tang)	Modern suspense		Official website
19 Jul- 22 Aug	To Catch the Uncatchable 棟篤神探	25	Dayo Wong, Ada Choi, Marco Ngai, Michael Tong	T: "衰邊個" (Dayo Wong)	Modern comedy		Official website
23 Aug- 2 Oct	War and Beauty 金枝慾孽	30	Sheren Tang, Bowie Lam, Gigi Lai, Moses Chan, Maggie Cheung, Charmaine Sheh, Kenny Wong	T: "兒女" (Bowie Lam); ST: "砒霜" (Bowie Lam)	Costume drama	Grand production	Official website
4 Oct- 12 Nov	Split Second 爭分奪秒	30	Alex Fong, Patrick Tam, Kevin Cheng, Yoyo Mung, Marco Ngai, Moses Chan, Mandy Cho		Modern action	Co-production with Thailand.	Official website
15 Nov- 26 Dec	The Last Breakthrough 天涯俠醫	30	Nick Cheung, Raymond Lam, Sonija Kwok, Leila Tong, Kiki Sheung, Sharon Chan	T: "心呼吸" (Raymond Lam)	Modern drama	Anniversary series	Official website
27 Dec 2004- 29 Jan 2005	Shades of Truth 水滸無間道	25	Julian Cheung, Wong He, Gigi Lai, Tavia Yeung, Yuen Wah	T: "沒有半分空間" (Wong He)	Modern action	. Copyright notice: 2004.	Official website

== Weekend Dramas ==
These dramas aired in Hong Kong from 10:00 to 11:00 pm, Sunday on TVB.

Airing date	English title (Chinese title)	Number of episodes	Main cast	Theme song (T) Sub-theme song (ST)	Genre	Notes	Official website
18 Apr- 16 May	ICAC Investigators 2004 廉政行動2004	5	Julian Cheung		Modern drama	In collaboration with ICAC.	
3 Oct- 26 Dec	Sunshine Heartbeat 赤沙印記@四葉草.2	11	Charles Szeto, Vin Choi, Vivien Yeo, Charmaine Li, Yoyo Chen, Joe Ma, Cathy Tsui	T: "Find Your Love" (Fiona Fung, Roxane Lo, & Peggy Lee)	Modern drama	TVB mini-series Related to 2003's Hearts of Fencing.	Official website

== Warehoused series ==
These dramas were released overseas and have not broadcast on TVB Jade Channel.

Oversea released date	English title (Chinese title)	Number of episodes	Main cast	Theme song (T) Sub-theme song (ST)	Genre	Notes	Official website
10 May- 4 Jun	Placebo Cure 心理心裏有個謎	20	Sunny Chan, Joyce Tang, Kevin Cheng	T: "心結" (Hacken Lee)	Modern drama		
