= List of TVB series (1998) =

This is a list of series released by or aired on TVB Jade Channel in 1998.

== First line series ==
These dramas aired in Hong Kong from 7:35pm to 8:35pm, Monday to Friday on TVB.

Airing date	English title (Chinese title)	Number of episodes	Main cast	Theme song (T) Sub-theme song (ST)	Genre	Notes	Official website
12 Jan- 6 Feb	A Tough Side of a Lady 花木蘭	20	Mariane Chan, Wong He, Gigi Fu, Sammy Lau, Law Ka Ying,	T: "揚眉女子" (Sally Yeh)	Costume action	TVB version of Mulan. Copyright notice: 1997 (Eps. 1–3, 16, & 19–20), 1998 (Eps. 4-15 & 17–18).	Official website
9 Feb- 6 Mar	A Place of One's Own 大澳的天空	20	Lawrence Ng, Nadia Chan, Mariane Chan, Yuen Wah, Louis Yuen, Melissa Ng	T: "晴天" (Nadia Chan)	Modern drama	Copyright notice: 1997.	Official website
9 Mar- 1 May	Dark Tales II 聊齋(貳)	40	Evergreen Mak, Angie Cheung, Jackie Lui, Noel Leung, Benny Chan, Louisa So, Rain Lau, Patrick Tam, Joey Leung	T: "只當是個夢" (彭羚) ST: "重回那天那地" (彭羚)	Costume drama	Sequel to 1996's Dark Tales.	Official website
4 May- 29 May	As Sure As Fate 師奶強人	20	Hacken Lee, Joyce Tang, Cutie Mui, Louis Yuen, Florence Kwok	T: "一支花" (Hacken Lee)	Modern drama	Released overseas on May 1, 1998.	Official website
1 Jun- 31 Jul	The Duke of Mount Deer 鹿鼎記	45	Jordan Chan, Steven Ma, Cherie Chan, Hilary Tsui, Noel Leung, Rain Lau	T: "叱吒紅人" (Jordan Chan); ST: "頭頂一片天" (Steven Ma)	Costume drama		Official website
3 Aug- 4 Sep	Old Time Buddy - To Catch a Thief 難兄難弟之神探李奇	25	Gallen Lo, Maggie Cheung, Gordon Lam, Elaine Ng	T: "Se Ma Ru" (Gallen Lo & Maggie Cheung)	Period drama	Related to 1997's Old Time Buddy.	Official website
7 Sep- 25 Sep	Simply Ordinary 林世榮	15	Gordon Lam, Kenix Kwok, Jay Lau	T: "有日會行運" (Hacken Lee)	Costume drama	Overseas version 20 episodes Copyright notice: 1997 (Eps. 1-4 & 6–7), 1998 (Eps. 5 & 8-20).	Official website
28 Sep- 23 Oct	Web of Love 網上有情人	20	Bobby Au Yeung, Maggie Siu, Astrid Chan, Louis Yuen	T: "緣分網開了" (Kit Chan)	Modern drama	Released overseas on July 23, 1998.	Official website
26 Oct- 18 Dec	Journey to the West II 西遊記(貳)	42	Benny Chan, Kwong Wah, Wayne Lai, Evergreen Mak	T: "取一念" (Benny Chan)	Costume drama	Sequel to 1996's Journey to the West.	Official website
21 Dec 1998- 15 Jan 1999	Moments of Endearment 外父唔怕做	20	Miriam Yeung, Nick Cheung, Paul Chun, Louisa So, Michael Tse	T: "讓我飛" (Miriam Yeung)	Modern drama	Released overseas on December 4, 1998.	Official website

== Second line series ==
These dramas aired in Hong Kong from 9:35pm to 10:35pm, Monday to Friday on TVB.

Airing date	English title (Chinese title)	Number of episodes	Main cast	Theme song (T) Sub-theme song (ST)	Genre	Notes	Official website
19 Jan- 13 Feb	A Measure of Love 緣來沒法擋	20	Gordon Lam, Angela Tong, Wayne Lai, Fennie Yuen	T: "有你有轉機" (Joyce Lee)	Modern drama	Released overseas on January 14, 1998. Copyright notice: 1997.	Official website
16 Feb- 9 May	Secret of the Heart 天地豪情	62	Felix Wong, Gallen Lo, Nick Cheung, Sunny Chan, Amy Kwok, Kathy Chow, Jessica Hsuan, Ada Choi, Melissa Ng, Paul Chun	T: "仍然在痛" (Gallen Lo); ST: "說天說地說空虛" (Gallen Lo)	Modern drama	Grand production Released overseas on February 12, 1998.	Official website
11 May- 9 Jun	Crimes of Passion 掃黃先鋒	22	Bobby Au Yeung, Kenix Kwok, Vincent Wan, Jay Lau, Marco Ngai	T: "無夢英雄" (Aaron Kwok)	Modern action	Released overseas on May 8, 1998.	Official website
6 Jul- 31 Jul	Armed Reaction 陀槍師姐	20	Bobby Au Yeung, Esther Kwan, Joyce Tang, Marco Ngai	T: "女人本色" (Sammi Cheng)	Modern action	Prequel to 2000's Armed Reaction II. Released overseas on September 25, 1997. Copyright notice: 1997.	Official website
3 Aug- 28 Aug	Rural Hero 離島特警	20	Jackie Lui, Jessica Hsuan, Roger Kwok, Fiona Yuen, Chillie Poon	T: "多一點" (Eason Chan)	Modern action		Official website
31 Aug- 10 Oct	Healing Hands 妙手仁心	32	Lawrence Ng, Bowie Lam, Ada Choi, Flora Chan, Steven Ma, William So, Nick Cheung, Astrid Chan	T: "Instrumental"; ST: "不想獨自快樂" (William So) ST: "曾經幾許" (Steven Ma)	Modern drama	Prequel to 2000's Healing Hands II.	Official website
12 Oct- 4 Dec	Burning Flame 烈火雄心	43	Wong He, Louis Koo, Esther Kwan, Waise Lee, Jade Leung, Chin Ka Lok, Lee San San	T: "火焰心" (Andy Lau)	Modern action	Indirect prequel to 2002's Burning Flame II. Released overseas on October 7, 1998.	Official website
7 Dec 1998- 1 Jan 1999	Till When Do Us Part 冤家宜結不宜解	20	Lawrence Ng, Kenix Kwok, Melissa Ng, Timmy Ho, Elvina Kong	T: "講理由" (Mavis Hee)	Modern drama		website

== Third line series ==
These dramas aired in Hong Kong from 10:35pm to 11:05pm, Monday to Friday on TVB.

Airing date	English title (Chinese title)	Number of episodes	Main cast	Theme song (T) Sub-theme song (ST)	Genre	Notes	Official website
15 May 1995- 17 Nov 1999	A Kindred Spirit 真情	1128	Louise Lee, Lau Dan, Nancy Sit, Kenix Kwok, Sunny Chan, Louisa So, Florence Kwok, Hawick Lau, Kingdom Yuen, David Lui, Melissa Ng, Michael Tse, Joyce Tang, Fiona Yuen, Joe Ma	T: "無悔愛你一生" (Joyce Lee)	Modern sitcom	Copyright notice: 1995 (Eps. 1-59), 1996 (Eps. 60-212), 1997 (Eps. 213–320), 1998 (Eps. 321–469), 1999 (Eps. 470–590).	Official website

== Other series ==
Airing date	English title (Chinese title)	Number of episodes	Main cast	Theme song (T) Sub-theme song (ST)	Genre	Notes	Official website
12 Jan- 6 Feb	War and Remembrance 乾隆大帝	20	Louis Koo, Yvonne Yung, John Chiang, Timmy Ho	T: "風雲色變" (Andy Lau)	Costume drama	Released overseas on May 15, 1997. Copyright notice: 1997.	Official website
25 Sep- 22 Oct	Before Dawn 愛在暴風的日子	20	Alex Fong, Kitty Lai, Frankie Lam, Marco Ngai	T: "火種" (Danny Summer); ST: "撲火是我" (Danny Summer)	Period drama	Released overseas on December 1995. Copyright notice: 1995.	Official website
28 Oct- 3 Nov	The Hitman Chronicles 大刺客	35	Kent Cheng, Louis Koo, Joe Ma, Patrick Tam	T: "英雄熱血" (Eric Moo)	Costume drama	Released overseas on September 9, 1996. Copyright notice: 1996.	Official website
1 Nov- 29 Nov	ICAC Investigators 1998 廉政行動1998	5	Joey Leung, Kwok Yiu Ming, Raymond Cho		Modern suspense	TVB production partnering with ICAC.	Official website
