= List of TVB series (2003) =

This is a list of series released by or aired on TVB Jade Channel in 2003.

== Top ten drama series in ratings ==
The following is a list of the highest-rated drama series released by TVB in 2003. The list includes premiere week and final week ratings.

Highest-rated drama series of 2003
Rank	English title	Chinese title	Average	Peak	Premiere	Final
1	Square Pegs	戇夫成龍	37	46	34	41
2	Witness to a Prosecution II	洗冤錄II	35	46	33	34
3	Vigilante Force	智勇新警界	34	41	31	36
4	The King of Yesterday and Tomorrow	九五至尊	34	46	30	40
5	Point of No Return	西關大少	34	40	31	34
6	Triumph in the Skies	衝上雲霄	32	37	31	32
7	Ups and Downs in the Sea of Love	十萬噸情緣	32	38	32	33
8	Survivor's Law	律政新人王	31	37	31	32
9	Whatever It Takes	天子尋龍	31	41	27	37
10	The Driving Power	非常外父	30	34	30	31

== First line series ==
These dramas aired in Hong Kong from 8:00 to 9:00 pm, Monday to Friday on TVB.

Airing date	English title (Chinese title)	Number of episodes	Main cast	Theme song (T) Sub-theme song (ST)	Genre	Notes	Official website
27 Jan- 21 Feb	The King of Yesterday and Tomorrow 九五至尊	20	Kwong Wah, Maggie Cheung, Melissa Ng, Paul Chun, Gilbert Lam	T: "彩構步" (Kwong Wah); ST: "延續一生都美麗" (Kwong Wah)	Modern drama		Official website
24 Feb- 21 Mar	Back to Square One 撲水冤家	20	Lawrence Ng, Moses Chan, Cecilia Yip	T: "有賺" (Patrick Tang)	Modern drama	Copyright notice: 2002 (Eps. 1-3 & 7-9), 2003 (Eps. 4-6 & 10-20).	Official website
24 Mar- 2 May	Perish in the Name of Love 帝女花	32	Charmaine Sheh, Steven Ma, Moses Chan, Sonija Kwok, Maggie Siu, Michael Tong, Annie Man, Marco Ngai	T: "帝女芳魂" (Steven Ma & Charmaine Sheh); ST: "錯認" (Steven Ma); ST: "兵車還" (Steven Ma); ST: "萬民萬家都好漢" (Steven Ma)	Costume drama	Released overseas on November 25, 2002. Copyright notice: 2002 (Eps. 1-31), 2003 (Ep. 32).	Official website
5 May- 30 May	In the Realm of Fancy 繾綣仙凡間	20	Kwong Wah, Shirley Yeung, Louis Fan, Marco Ngai	T: "未悔用情" (Kwong Wah)	Costume drama	Released overseas on October 21, 2002. Copyright notice: 2002.	Official website
2 Jun- 28 Jun	Fate Twisters 黑夜彩虹	22	Lawrence Ng, Ada Choi, Gigi Lai, Eddie Kwan	T: "路直路彎" (William So)	Modern drama	Released overseas on December 16, 2002. Copyright notice: 2002.	Official website
30 Jun- 25 Jul	Better Halves 金牌冰人	20	Steven Ma, Maggie Cheung, Moses Chan, Joyce Koi	T: "美麗緣份" (Steven Ma); ST: "情牽一線" (Steven Ma & Maggie Cheung)	Costume drama		Official website
28 Jul- 22 Aug	Aqua Heroes 戀愛自由式	20	Bobo Chan, Edwin Siu, Bosco Wong, Leila Tong, Sheren Tang, Chris Lai, Stephy Tang	T: "可疑密友" (Bobo Chan & Edwin Siu)	Modern drama		Official website
25 Aug- 5 Sep	Princess Pearl III 還珠格格III: 天上人間	40	Leo Ku	T: "天上人間" (Leo Ku)	Costume drama	Taiwanese series Sequel to 1999's Princess Pearl II.	
8 Sep- 3 Oct	Find the Light 英雄·刀·少年	20	Damian Lau, Maggie Siu, Ron Ng, Bosco Wong, Tavia Yeung, Leila Tong, Shirley Yeung	T: "肝膽相照" (Frances Yip)	Costume drama		Official website
6 Oct- 31 Oct	The Driving Power 非常外父	20	Adam Cheng, Cecilia Yip, Michelle Ye, Joyce Tang, Wayne Lai, Kenneth Ma	T: "變" (Adam Cheng)	Period drama		Official website
3 Nov- 12 Dec	Point of No Return 西關大少	30	Damian Lau, Julian Cheung, Angie Chiu, Charmaine Sheh, Sammul Chan	T: "相愛無夢" (Julian Cheung)	Period drama	Released overseas on August 18, 2003.	Official website
15 Dec 2003- 6 Feb 2004	The Bronze Teeth II 鐵齒銅牙紀曉嵐 II	40	Zhang Guo Li		Costume action	China series Sequel to 2002's The Bronze Teeth; Prequel to 2006's The Bronze Teeth III.	

== Second line series ==
These dramas aired in Hong Kong from 9:00 to 10:00 pm (9:05 to 9:35 pm from 5 May onwards), Monday to Friday on TVB.

Airing date	English title (Chinese title)	Number of episodes	Main cast	Theme song (T) Sub-theme song (ST)	Genre	Notes	Official website
27 Jan- 21 Feb	Whatever It Takes 天子尋龍	20	Benny Chan, Annie Man, Tavia Yeung	T: "天子尋龍" (Jenny Tseng)	Costume drama	Released overseas on December 31, 2001. Copyright notice: 2001.	Official website
24 Feb- 23 Mar	Witness to a Prosecution II 洗冤錄II	22	Bobby Au Yeung, Charmaine Sheh, Stephen Au, Joyce Tang	T: "一個人" (Eason Chan)	Costume drama	Sequel to 1999's Witness to a Prosecution. Released overseas on July 29, 2002. Copyright notice: 2002.	Official website
24 Mar- 2 May	Vigilante Force 智勇新警界	30	Bowie Lam, Benny Chan, Joe Ma, Kenix Kwok, Tavia Yeung	T: "一字馬" (Bowie Lam); ST: "敢情線" (Benny Chan); ST: "如果你是我的愛人" (Bowie Lam)	Modern drama	Released overseas on February 24, 2003. Copyright notice: 2002.	Official website
5 May 2003- 22 Jan 2005	Virtues of Harmony II 皆大歡喜(時裝版)	443	Nancy Sit, Frankie Lam, Bernice Liu, Michael Tse, Cutie Mui, Kingdom Yuen, Bondy Chiu, Joyce Chen, Louis Yuen, Stephanie Che, Lau Dan, Hawick Lau, Steven Ma, Linda Chung	T: "皆大歡喜" (Nancy Sit); ST: "寸草心" (Nancy Sit)	Modern sitcom	Indirect sequel to 2001's Virtues of Harmony.	Official website

== Third line series ==
These dramas aired in Hong Kong from 10:05 to 11:05 pm (9:30 to 10:30 pm from 5 May onwards), Monday to Friday on TVB.

Airing date	English title (Chinese title)	Number of episodes	Main cast	Theme song (T) Sub-theme song (ST)	Genre	Notes	Official website
2 Jan- 9 Feb	Meteor Garden II 流星花園II	31	Jerry Yan, Vanness Wu, Vic Zhou, Ken Chu		Modern drama	Taiwanese series Sequel to 2001's Meteor Garden.	
5 May- 30 May	Ups and Downs in the Sea of Love 十萬噸情緣	20	Nick Cheung, Maggie Cheung, Joyce Tang, Stephen Au, Angela Tong	T: "全速前進" (Nick Cheung)	Modern drama	Copyright notice: 2002.	Official website
2 Jun- 11 Jul	The 'W' Files 衛斯理	30	Gallen Lo, Yoyo Mung, Michael Tong, Tavia Yeung	T: "未來的守望者" (Gallen Lo); ST: "如果世界有了你" (Gallen Lo)	Period drama		Official website
14 Jul- 15 Aug	Survivor's Law 律政新人王	25	Raymond Lam, Sammul Chan, Myolie Wu, Bernice Liu	T: "忘記傷害" (Raymond Lam)	Modern drama	Prequel to 2007's Survivor's Law II.	Official website
18 Aug- 12 Sep	Not Just a Pretty Face 美麗在望	20	Roger Kwok, Joey Yung, Kevin Cheng	T: "會很美" (Roger Kwok & Joey Yung)	Modern drama		Official website
15 Sep- 24 Oct	Seed of Hope 俗世情真	30	Kenix Kwok, Patrick Tam, Anne Heung	T: "全靠我沒有" (Patrick Tam)	Modern drama	Released overseas on June 23, 2003.	Official website
27 Oct- 20 Dec	Triumph in the Skies 衝上雲霄	40	Francis Ng, Flora Chan, Joe Ma, Myolie Wu, Ron Ng, Michelle Ye, Sammul Chan, Bosco Wong, Kenneth Ma	T: "歲月如歌" (Eason Chan); ST: "我不愛你" (Flora Chan)	Modern drama	Grand production	Official website
22 Dec 2003- 16 Jan 2004	Life Begins at Forty 花樣中年	20	Alex Fong, Chin Ka Lok, Charmaine Sheh, Anne Heung		Modern drama	Released overseas on June 2, 2003.	Official website

== Weekend Dramas ==
=== Saturday series ===
These dramas aired in Hong Kong from 9:30 to 10:30 pm, Saturday on TVB.

Airing date	English title (Chinese title)	Number of episodes	Main cast	Theme song (T) Sub-theme song (ST)	Genre	Notes	Official website
8 Mar	The Threat of Love II; Loving You 我愛你2	10	Sheren Tang, Lawrence Ng, Nancy Sit, Chung King Fai, Kevin Cheng, Shirley Yeung		Modern drama	TVB mini-series Indirect sequel to 2000's The Threat of Love. Released overseas on October 7, 2002. Copyright notice: 2002.	Official website

=== Sunday series ===
These dramas aired in Hong Kong from 9:30 to 10:30 pm, Sunday on TVB.

Airing date	English title (Chinese title)	Number of episodes	Main cast	Theme song (T) Sub-theme song (ST)	Genre	Notes	Official website
12 Feb- 25 Jun	Hearts of Fencing 當四葉草碰上劍尖時	11	Chris Lai, Don Li, Eddie Li, Sam Chan, 2R, Elaine Yiu, Natalie Tong, Edmond Leung	T: "Shining Friends" (2R)	Modern drama	TVB mini-series Related to 2004's Sunshine Heartbeat.	Official website

== Warehoused series ==
These dramas were released overseas and have not broadcast on TVB Jade Channel.

Oversea released date	English title (Chinese title)	Number of episodes	Main cast	Theme song (T) Sub-theme song (ST)	Genre	Notes	Official website
2 Jun- 27 Jun	The Legend of Love 牛郎織女	20	Deric Wan, Sonija Kwok, Leila Tong, Stephen Au	T: "非愛不可" (Gillian Chung & Kelvin Kwan)	Costume drama		
15 Dec 2003- 23 Jan 2004	Riches and Stitches 鳳舞香羅	30	Moses Chan, Gigi Lai, Kwong Wah, Anne Heung, Melissa Ng, Marco Ngai, Michael Tong	T: "鳳舞香羅" (Priscilla Chan)	Period drama	Grand production Aired on TVB Pay Vision Channel in May 2006.	Official website
