= List of TVB series (2006) =

This is a list of series released by TVB in 2006.

== Top ten drama series in ratings ==
The following is a list of TVB's top serial dramas in 2006 by average ratings. The list includes premiere week and final week ratings, as well as the average overall count of live Hong Kong viewers (in millions).

Highest-rating drama series of 2006
Rank	English title	Chinese title	Average	Peak	Premiere week	Final week	HK viewers (millions)
1	La Femme Desperado	女人唔易做	33	41	31	34	2.12
2	Forensic Heroes	法證先鋒	33	43	28	37	2.12
3	The Saviour of the Soul	神鵰俠侶	32	40	32	35	2.05
4	Love Guaranteed	愛情全保	32	36	30	34	2.05
5	The Dance of Passion	火舞黃沙	32	38	34	35	2.05
6	To Grow with Love	肥田囍事	32	35	32	32	2.05
7	Bar Bender	潮爆大狀	32	38	31	34	2.05
8	Maidens' Vow	鳳凰四重奏	32	37	32	29	2.05
9	Men in Pain	男人之苦	32	39	28	33	2.05
10	Under the Canopy of Love	天幕下的戀人	31	37	28	33	1.99

== First line series ==
These dramas aired in Hong Kong from 8:00pm to 9:00pm (UTC+8; 8:00pm to 8:30pm from 10 April onwards), Monday to Friday on TVB.

Airing date	English title (Chinese title)	Number of episodes	Main cast	Theme song (T) Sub-theme song (ST)	Genre	Notes	Official website
2 Jan- 17 Feb	The Bronze Teeth III 鐵齒銅牙紀曉嵐III	35	Zhang Guo Li	T: "誰說書生百無一用"	Costume action	China series Sequel to 2004's The Bronze Teeth II.	Official website
20 Feb- 17 Mar	Under the Canopy of Love 天幕下的戀人	20	Kevin Cheng, Niki Chow, Bosco Wong	T: "請講" (Kevin Cheng & Niki Chow)	Modern drama	Copyright notice: 2005.	Official website
20 Mar- 14 Apr	The Biter Bitten 人生馬戲團	20	Benny Chan, Michael Tong, Shirley Yeung, Linda Chung, Stephen Au	T: "只需與你" (Shirley Yeung)	Modern adventure	Copyright notice: 2005.	Official website
10 Apr 2006- 10 Mar 2007	Welcome to the House 高朋滿座	239	Lawrence Cheng, Christine Ng, Chung King Fai, Raymond Cho, Angelina Lo, Kingdom Yuen, Johnson Lee, Shermon Tang	T: "細路仔" (Lawrence Cheng, Christine Ng, Chung King Fai, Raymond Cho, Angelina Lo, Kingdom Yuen, Johnson Lee, & Shermon Tang)	Modern sitcom	Copyright notice: 2006 (Eps. 1-194), 2007 (Eps. 195-239).	Official website

== Second line series ==
These dramas aired in Hong Kong from 9:00pm to 10:00pm (8:30pm to 9:30pm from 10 April onwards), Monday to Friday on TVB.

Airing date	English title (Chinese title)	Number of episodes	Main cast	Theme song (T) Sub-theme song (ST)	Genre	Notes	Official website
7 Dec 2005- 4 Jan 2006	When Rules Turn Loose 識法代言人	21	Liza Wang, Myolie Wu, Sammul Chan, Ha Yu, Wayne Lai, Marco Ngai		Modern drama		Official website
5 Jan- 25 Feb	Lethal Weapons of Love and Passion 覆雨翻雲	40	Raymond Lam, Charmaine Sheh, Sonija Kwok, Bosco Wong, Sharon Chan	T: "出鞘" (Raymond Lam); ST: "領會" (Raymond Lam)	Costume action	Released overseas on December 26, 2005. Copyright notice: 2005.	Official website
31 Jan- 26 Feb	A Pillow Case of Mystery 施公奇案	20	Bobby Au Yeung, Kenix Kwok, Benny Chan, Tavia Yeung	T: "先知先覺" (Benny Chan)	Costume comedy	Copyright notice: 2005.	Official website
27 Feb- 31 Mar	Safe Guards 鐵血保鏢	25	Steven Ma, Wayne Lai, Elaine Yiu	T: "會友之鄉" (Steven Ma)	Costume drama	Copyright notice: 2005.	Official website
3 Apr- 28 Apr	Bar Bender 潮爆大狀	20	Adam Cheng, Louisa So, Sammul Chan, Leila Tong, Anne Heung, Bill Chan	T: "身外物" (Adam Cheng)	Modern drama Courtroom drama		Official website
17 April- 14 May	La Femme Desperado 女人唔易做	22	Sheren Tang, Melissa Ng, Raymond Lam, Michael Tse, Kenneth Ma, Kate Tsui	ST: "有過去的女人" (Miriam Yeung)	Modern drama	Copyright notice: 2005.	Official website
15 May- 9 Jun	Trimming Success 飛短留長父子兵	20	Kevin Cheng, Nadia Chan, Wayne Lai, Halina Tam, Sharon Chan	T: "愛平凡" (Kevin Cheng)	Modern drama	Released overseas on January 2, 2006. Copyright notice: 2005.	Official website
13 Jun- 9 Jul	Men in Pain 男人之苦	21	Damian Lau, Ron Ng, Louisa So, Toby Leung	ST: "金剛" (Ron Ng)	Modern drama		Official website
10 Jul- 27 Aug	The Saviour of the Soul 神鵰俠侶	37	Huang Xiao Ming, Liu Yifei	T: "情義兩心堅" (Andy Lau)	Costume drama	China series	Official website
28 Aug- 6 Oct	Maidens' Vow 鳳凰四重奏	30	Charmaine Sheh, Joe Ma, Sammul Chan	T: "蝶變" (Charmaine Sheh); ST: "禁戀" (Charmaine Sheh)	Drama		Official website
9 Oct- 3 Nov	At Home With Love 樓住有情人	20	Lawrence Ng, Yoyo Mung, Chung King Fai, Raymond Cho	T: "逐格重播" (Sharon Chan)	Modern drama		Official website
6 Nov- 15 Dec	Glittering Days 東方之珠	30	Liza Wang, Charmaine Sheh, Roger Kwok, Susanna Kwan, Chris Lai	T: "東方之珠" (Liza Wang); ST: "遙遙的祝勉" (Charmaine Sheh & Wong Cho Lam); ST: "白雲天" (Liza Wang & Wong Cho Lam)	Period drama	Anniversary series	Official website
18 Dec 2006- 10 Feb 2007	The Conquest 爭霸	42	Damian Lau, Joe Ma, Sonija Kwok, Aloys Chan, Power Chan	T: "爭霸" (Aloys Chan); ST: "真永遠" (Aloys Chan)	Costume action	Released overseas on June 12, 2006.	Official website

== Third line series ==
These dramas aired in Hong Kong from 10:00pm to 11:00pm (9:30pm to 10:30pm from 10 April onwards), Monday to Friday on TVB.

Airing date	English title (Chinese title)	Number of episodes	Main cast	Theme song (T) Sub-theme song (ST)	Genre	Notes	Official website
2 Jan- 27 Jan	Greed Mask 謎情家族	20	Roger Kwok, Christine Ng, Annie Man, Wayne Lai	T: "愛的推理" (Andy Hui)	Modern suspense	Released overseas on May 5, 2003. Copyright notice: 2003.	Official website
27 Feb- 7 Apr	Hail the Judge 棟篤狀王	35	Dayo Wong, William So	T: "知彼不知己" (Dayo Wong); ST: "燃愛" (William So)	Costume comedy	China series	Official website
1 May- 12 Jun	The Dance of Passion 火舞黃沙	32	Gigi Lai, Ada Choi, Charmaine Sheh, Bowie Lam, Moses Chan, Maggie Siu, Kenny Wong	T: "風沙" (Bowie Lam); ST: "黃沙中的戀人" (Charmaine Sheh)	Period drama	Grand production Copyright notice: 2005.	Official website
13 Jun- 16 Jul	Forensic Heroes 法證先鋒	25	Bobby Au Yeung, Frankie Lam, Yoyo Mung, Linda Chung	T: "天網" (Frankie Lam)	Modern suspense	Prequel to 2008's Forensic Heroes II.	Official website
17 Jul- 11 Aug	Love Guaranteed 愛情全保	20	Sunny Chan, Melissa Ng, Kenneth Ma, Cherie Kong, Paul Chun	T: "Let It Flow" (Stephy Tang)	Modern drama		Official website
14 Aug- 8 Sep	C.I.B. Files 刑事情報科	20	Bowie Lam, Christine Ng, Wong He, Maggie Siu	T: "情報" (Bowie Lam)	Modern drama		Official website
11 Sep- 21 Oct	Land of Wealth 滙通天下	32	Moses Chan, Steven Ma, Sonija Kwok, Tavia Yeung	T: "滙通天下" (Eason Chan); ST: "川流不息" (Moses Chan)	Period drama		Official website
23 Oct- 18 Nov	To Grow with Love 肥田囍事	21	Myolie Wu, Andy Hui, Jack Wu, Claire Yiu, Selena Lee, Eddie Kwan	T: "醜得漂亮" (Myolie Wu & Andy Hui); ST: "豬小姐" (Myolie Wu); ST: "豬先生" (Andy Hui)	Modern drama	Anniversary series	Official website
20 Nov 2006- 5 Jan 2007	Dicey Business 賭場風雲	35	Bobby Au Yeung, Jessica Hsuan, Michael Miu, Bosco Wong, Tavia Yeung, Benz Hui	T: "先賭為快" (Hacken Lee); ST: "第幾天" (Bosco Wong)	Modern drama	Grand production	Official website

== Fourth line series ==
These dramas aired in Hong Kong at 12:05 to 1:15 am, Monday to Friday on TVB.

Airing date	English title (Chinese title)	Number of episodes	Main cast	Theme song (T) Sub-theme song (ST)	Genre	Notes	Official website
17 May- 9 Jun	Net Deception 追魂交易	20	Wong He, Myolie Wu, Jack Wu, Eddie Kwan	T: "灰色恐怖" (Wong He); ST: "價值" (Wong He)	Modern suspense	Released overseas on January 5, 2004. Copyright notice: 2003.	Official website
13 Jun- 8 Jul	Summer Heat 心慌·心鬱·逐個捉	20	Joyce Tang, Joe Ma, Mark Kwok, Raymond Cho	T: "伶仃" (Kelly Chen)	Modern suspense	Released overseas on January 19, 2004. Copyright notice: 2003.	Official website
12 Jul- 25 Aug	Eternity: A Chinese Ghost Story 倩女幽魂	32	Barbie Shu, Daniel Chan, Jason Wu, Jessica Hsuan	T: "倩女幽魂" (Daniel Chan); ST: "般若波羅蜜" (Daniel Chan); ST: "吻去下愛上你" (Daniel Chan)	Costume drama	Taiwanese series	Official website

== Weekend Dramas ==
These dramas aired in Hong Kong from 5:30 to 6:30 pm, Saturday on TVB.

Airing date	English title (Chinese title)	Number of episodes	Main cast	Theme song (T) Sub-theme song (ST)	Genre	Notes	Official website
22 Oct 2005- 20 May 2006	My MVP Valentine; MVP情人	29	Angela Chang, Tony Sun	T: "無所謂" (5566)	Modern drama	Taiwanese series	
27 May- 5 Aug	Attack No. 1 新排球女將	11			Modern drama	Japanese series	Official website

These dramas aired in Hong Kong from 10:30 to 11:15 pm, Saturday on TVB.

Airing date	English title (Chinese title)	Number of episodes	Main cast	Theme song (T) Sub-theme song (ST)	Genre	Notes	Official website
15 Apr- 1 Jul	Train Man 電車男	11	Misaki Ito, Atsushi Itō	T: "Mr. Roboto" (Styx)	Modern drama	Japanese series	Official website
22 Apr- 8 Jul	Stephen's Diary 老馮日記	11	Stephen Fung, Crystal Tin, Edmond Leung		Modern comedy		Official website

== Warehoused series ==
These dramas were released overseas and have not broadcast on TVB Jade Channel.

Oversea released date	English title (Chinese title)	Number of episodes	Main cast	Theme song (T) Sub-theme song (ST)	Genre	Notes	Official website
27 Feb- 21 Apr	Vagabond Vigilante 游劍江湖	40	Kenny Ho, Sonija Kwok, Jonny Chen, Sunny Chan, Tammy Chen		Costume drama	Released in China on October 13, 2005. Copyright notice: 2005.	
15 May- 9 Jun	Au Revoir Shanghai 上海傳奇	20	Michael Miu, Bosco Wong, Anne Heung, Shirley Yeung	T: "無人愛" (Bosco Wong)	Period drama	Aired on TVB Pay Vision Channel in August 2008. Copyright notice: 2005 (Eps. 1-3, 7-9, & 13-16), 2006 (Eps. 4-6, 10-12, & 17-20).	
21 Aug- 29 Sep	Face to Fate 布衣神相	30	Frankie Lam, Raymond Lam, Tavia Yeung, Selena Li, Anne Heung, Nancy Wu, John Chiang	T: "披荊斬刺" (Raymond Lam); ST: "靠近" (Frankie Lam & Tavia Yeung)	Costume action	Aired on TVB Pay Vision Channel in March 2007. Copyright notice: 2005.	Official website
18 Dec 2006- 12 Jan 2007	The Price of Greed 千謊百計	20	Bosco Wong, Sammul Chan, Shirley Yeung, Kate Tsui, Kingdom Yuen	T: "角色" (Bosco Wong)	Period drama	Aired on TVB Pay Vision Channel in January 2008.	
