= Armed Reaction IV =

Hong Kong television series

- Promo poster
- 陀槍師姐IV
- Genre: Crime thriller, Modern drama
- Created by: Hong Kong Television Broadcasts Limited
- Starring: Bobby Au-yeung; Ada Choi; Joyce Tang; Marco Ngai; Mimi Chu; Frankie Lam; Yoyo Mung
- Opening theme: Speeding 超速駕駛 by Sammi Cheng
- Ending theme: Got Off the Wrong Car 落錯車 by Sammi Cheng
- Country of origin: Hong Kong
- Original language: Cantonese
- No. of episodes: 40

Production
- Producer: Kwong Jip Sang
- Production location: Hong Kong
- Camera setup: Multi camera
- Running time: 45 minutes
- Production company: TVB

Original release
- Network: Jade
- Release: 16 February – 9 April 2004

Related
- Armed Reaction; Armed Reaction II; Armed Reaction III; Armed Reaction 2021

Armed Reaction IV
- Traditional Chinese: 陀槍師姐IV
- Simplified Chinese: 陀枪师姐IV
- Literal meaning: "Gun Carrying Police Women IV"
Transcriptions
Standard Mandarin
- Hanyu Pinyin: tuó qiāng shī jiě IV
Yue: Cantonese
- Yale Romanization: tor cheung si tze IV
- Jyutping: to4 coeng1 si1 ze2 IV

Armed Reaction IV (Chinese: 陀槍師姐 IV; Jyutping: to4 coeng1 si1 ze2 IV) is a Hong Kong modern cop drama released overseas in August 2003. The drama stars Bobby Au-yeung and Ada Choi as the main leads with Joyce Tang, Marco Ngai, Mimi Chu, Frankie Lam and Yoyo Mung in main supporting roles. Original broadcast of the series began on TVB Jade channel from February 2 till April 9, 2004 at 9:30-10:30 p.m. timeslot with 40 episodes total.

== Synopsis ==
The series takes place a few months after the 3rd installment.

Chan Siu Sang (Bobby Au-Yeung) and Wai Ying Zi (Ada Choi) have been dating for a while and seems to be in a stable relationship. Everything seems to be looking up for Ying Zi now that she's in a stable relationship and finally got a promotion at work, but the only thing that she and Siu Sang seem to fight about is marriage. He wants to rush into marriage but she wants to put it off for a few years to focus on her career since it is flourishing. Their relationship is further complicated when Siu Sang becomes jealous of Ying Zi's new handsome co-worker Ken (Frankie Lam), and Ying Zi becomes mad that Siu Sang does not trust her, so the two decide to break up. Ying Zi soon starts dating Ken since the two grew close while working together and Siu Sang begins dating Sunnie (Yoyo Mung) who works at the forensic department after being pursued by her.

Having gone through so many tragedies in the past Chan Sam Yuen (Joyce Tang) finally decides to focus on her family as top priority. She and Ching Fung (Marco Ngai) have patched up their marriage even though it is still not perfect. With a difficult pregnancy, Sum Yuen is no longer focused on her career. All seems well with her and Fung when she gives birth to a son until Fung gets entangled with female triad boss Chiang Tin Wing and her husband Sing Jin Choi. Fung is in charge of the case of Wing and her crime empire. While investigating Wing, she takes a liking to Fung and drugs him so she can have her ways with him. She uses their one night of passion to blackmail Fung into continuing their affair. Choi finds out about the affair between his wife and Fung. Enraged with his wife's infidelity, he accidentally kills her and frames Fung for her murder. With evidence to clear Fung of the crime, Choi decides to kill Fung as revenge for ruining his marriage.

== Cast ==
=== Chan family ===
- Bobby Au-Yeung 歐陽震華 as Chan Siu-Sang 陳小生 - Wai Ying Zhi's boyfriend and later ex-boyfriend. Chief Inspector of CID Task Force
- Mimi Chu 朱咪咪 as Wong Yee Mui 王二妹 - Chan Siu-Sang's sister-in-law and Chan Sam Yuen, Sei Hei, Ng Fuk's mother. She owns and manages a coffee and tea cafe.
- Koey Leung 梁雪湄 as Chan Sei Hei 陳四喜 - Chan Siu-Sang's niece and Wong Yee Mui's middle daughter. Tung Ka Fai's girlfriend then wife.
- John Tang 鄧一君 as Tung Ka Fai 童家輝 - Chan Sei Hei's husband. A computer prodigy, he left the police cyber unit to start his own business.
- Sherming Yiu 姚樂怡 as Chan Ng Fuk 陳五福 - Chan Siu-Sang's niece and Wong Yee Mui's youngest daughter. Au Chi Keung's girlfriend.

=== Ching family ===
- Marco Ngai 魏駿傑 as Ching Fung 程峰 - Chan Sam Yuen's husband. Promoted as Chief Inspector of West Kowloon RCU Team 1 in Episode 8. Later disappeared.
- Joyce Tang 滕麗名 as Chan Sam Yuen 陳三元 - Chan Siu-Sang's niece and Wong Yee Mui's eldest daughter. Ching Fung's wife. Inspector of Accident Investigation of West Kowloon Traffic Unit, then Inspector of Enforcement and Control (E&C) of West Kowloon Traffic Unit.
- Chor Yuen 楚原 as Ching Sau Chung 程守忠 - Ching Fung's father.
- Helen Ma 馬海倫 as Ho Kam Mui 何金梅 - Ching Fung's mother.
- Wong Mei-Kei 黃美棋 as Ching Sa Sa 程莎莎 - Sam Yuen and Ching Fung's preteen daughter.

=== Wai family ===
- Ada Choi 蔡少芬 as Wai Ying Zi 衛英姿 - The new rookie female cop. She and Chan Siu-Sang become couple. Later broke up. Promoted to sergeant.
- Ha Ping 夏萍 as Choi Yuk Lan 蔡玉蘭 - Chin San San's mother and Wai Ying Zi's grandmother.
- Ha Yu 夏雨 as Wai Ying Hung 衛英雄 - Wai Ying Zi's father. Mechanic garage owner. Wong Suk Sum's husband.
- Akina Hong Wah 康華 as Wong Suk Sum 王素心 - Former triad boss's wife. Wai Ying Hung's wife.
- Rosanne Lui 呂珊 as Chin San San 錢珊珊 - Wai Ying Hung's ex-wife and Wai Ying Zi's mother.

=== Fung family ===
- Yoyo Mung 蒙嘉慧 as Sunnie Fong Ching 方晴 - Senior Chemist of forensics. Later Chan Siu-Sang girlfriend.
- Mary Hon 韓馬利 as Law Gim Fai 羅劍暉 - Sunnie Fong's mother.

=== Police officers ===
- Frankie Lam 林文龍 as Ken Kong Ji Kin 鄺梓鍵 - Wai Ying Zi co-worker, later boyfriend. SP of West Kowloon RCU Team.
- Timothy Siu 邵傳勇 as Au Chi Keung 歐志強
- Li Shing-cheong 李成昌 as Sergeant Bao Ding Tin 鮑頂天
- Lo Chun Shun 魯振順 as CSP Leung 梁Sir
- Celine Ma 馬蹄露 as Chu Siu Fung 朱少芬
- Eddie Li Gong Lung 李岡龍 as Cheng Gut Yeung 鄭吉祥
- Johnson Law 羅莽 as Pun Chi Bun 潘志彬
- Kwok Tak Shun 郭德信 as Au Sir 歐Sir
- Lo Hoi-pang 盧海鵬 as Gim Suk 劍叔
- Felix Lok 駱應鈞 as Pang Sir 彭Sir

=== Others ===
- Joe Junior as Cheung Biu 張標
- Raymond Cho 曹永廉 as Chan Ga Hei 陳家希
- Catherine Chau 周家怡 as Ho Bik Ling 何碧玲
- Kenneth Ma 馬國明 as Andy
- Eric Chung 鍾志光 as Frank
- Andy Dai 戴志偉 as Heung Tak Wai 向德偉
- Lau Kong 劉江 as Chiang Kun 蔣權
- Angie Cheong 張慧儀 as Chiang Tin Wing 蔣天穎
- Evergreen Mak 麥長青 as Sing Jin Choi 成展才
- Gordon Liu 劉家輝 as Yam Cung Yun 任重遠

== Casting ==
- The fourth series continues with Ada Choi as the female lead actress.
- Same as the previous installments of the series some of the supporting actors in the first two series play completely different characters in this series with no relations to the characters they previously played.

== Controversies and complaints ==
Armed Reaction IV received much complaints about the story not tying back to Armed Reaction III.

- It was mentioned that Chan Sam Yuen became pregnant at the end of Armed Reaction III. In the early episodes of Armed Reaction IV she is 7 months pregnant. Chan Sam Yuen and Ching Fung's daughter Ching Sa Sa was only four years old in Armed Reaction III, but in Armed Reaction IV she is a preteen. Audiences complained that the rapid aging of Ching Sa Sa did not make sense.
- In Armed Reaction III Wai Ying Zi had promised that she would marry Chan Siu-Sang when she receives the "gold whistle" (a Hong Kong Police award), but in Armed Reaction IV when she receives the "gold whistle", she does not marry Chan Siu-Sang and her promise is not mentioned. (However, the complaint is unfounded because in the first episode Wai Ying Zi mentioned that she will marry Chan Siu Sang after she gets promoted and used the "gold whistle" as a symbol of their promise)
- Tung Ka Fai promised his wife Chan Sei Hei that he would stay and work in Hong Kong in Armed Reaction III, but in the 4th series he is constantly traveling overseas for work.
- At the end of Armed Reaction III Chan Ng Fuk and Au Chi Keung got engaged but in Armed Reaction IV they are only still dating.
- Ching Fung's whereabouts were left without any conclusion. As Armed Reaction IV ended the other main characters were still searching for him. In the last episode, however, officers in Kat O island found his whereabouts.

== Sequel ==
In February 2020, a sequel set over ten years later began production under the working title Armed Reaction V with new leads Jessica Hsuan and Moses Chan. The only main cast member to return is Joyce Tang but after suffering a ski injury in Japan, her role was significantly reduced appearing in only 8 out of 30 episodes with many of her action scenes cut. Actresses Mimi Chu and Maggie Wong also reprised their roles and actor Henry Lee returned in a new role. It was released as Armed Reaction 2021 in January 2021. The series was met with mainly negative reviews and was criticized for its new comedic theme and old-fashioned storytelling but some acting performances were met with praise.

== Ratings ==
Week	Episode	Date	Average ratings
1	01-05	Feb 16 - 20, 2004	29
2	06-10	Feb 22 - 27, 2004	29
3	11-15	Feb 27 - Mar 4, 2004	28
4	16-20	Mar 6 - 10, 2004	28
5	21-25	Mar 12 - 17, 2004	29
6	26-30	Mar 19 - 24, 2004	31
7	31-35	Mar 26 - 30, 2004	30
8	36-40	April 2–9, 2004	31
