= Armed Reaction II =

Hong Kong television series

- Promo poster
- 陀槍師姐II
- Genre: Crime thriller, modern drama
- Created by: Hong Kong Television Broadcasts Limited
- Starring: Bobby Au-yeung; Esther Kwan; Joyce Tang; Marco Ngai; Mimi Chu
- Opening theme: "Separate From Men Women" 另類男女 by Sammi Cheng
- Country of origin: Hong Kong
- Original language: Cantonese
- No. of episodes: 32

Production
- Producer: Kwong Jip Sang
- Production location: Hong Kong
- Camera setup: Multi-camera
- Running time: 45 minutes
- Production company: TVB

Original release
- Network: Jade
- Release: 29 May – 8 July 2000

Related
- Armed Reaction; Armed Reaction III; Armed Reaction IV; Armed Reaction 2021

Armed Reaction II
- Traditional Chinese: 陀槍師姐II
- Simplified Chinese: 陀枪师姐II
- Literal meaning: "Gun Carrying Police WomenII"
Transcriptions
Standard Mandarin
- Hanyu Pinyin: tuó qiāng shī jiě II
Yue: Cantonese
- Yale Romanization: tor cheung si tze II
- Jyutping: to4 coeng1 si1 ze2 II

Armed Reaction II (Chinese: 陀槍師姐 II; Jyutping: to4 coeng1 si1 ze2 II) is a 2000 Hong Kong modern cop drama produced by TVB. The drama stars Bobby Au-yeung and Esther Kwan as the main leads with Joyce Tang, Marco Ngai, Mimi Chu and Joe Ma in main supporting roles. Original broadcast of the series began on TVB Jade channel from May 29 to July 8, 2000, at 9:30-10:30 p.m. timeslot with 32 episodes total.

Armed Reaction II was produced due to high ratings and positive reviews of the first installment of Armed Reaction.

== Synopsis ==
The story takes place a few years from the first series.

Chu So Ngo (Esther Kwan) has been promoted to sergeant rank in the police but she encounters professional setbacks due to her new responsibilities. She depends on fellow cop Chan Siu Sang (Bobby Au-Yeung) who is now her boyfriend for support and a secure future, and hopes for him to get promoted soon. They plan to get married. The added pressure of waiting for a promotion and So Ngo depending on him gets to Siu Sang, and he finds some breathing room with Sum Yeo (Eileen Yeow), his beautiful next door neighbor whom he sees as a platonic friend. When So Ngo finds out that she cannot have any more children, she rethinks whether she and Siu Sang should really get married. With all the added pressure in their relationship, both decide to break up. Siu Sang finds relief in Sum Yeo, whom he dates briefly and soon marries. So Ngo starts a relationship with taxi driver Yeung Kwong Chiu (Eddie Cheung), who thinks she looks like his dead wife.

Sam Yuen (Joyce Tang) and Ching Fung (Marco Ngai) are also experiencing difficulties in their new marriage when San Yuan is transferred to the Special Police Unit and concentrates more on her career than starting a family. With added pressure from the in-laws to start having grandchildren, and Sam Yuen's persistence in placing her career first, the two's marriage begins to fall apart due to constant bickering and misunderstanding. After having a huge fight with Sam Yuen when she failed to show up at her mother in law's birthday party because of an accident. Fung spends time at a bar to drink his frustrations away then proceeds to have a one-night stand with a stranger whom came on to him. With their marriage in jeopardy Sam Yuen further buries herself in her career, putting all her concentration into her current case regarding a serial psycho sex offender taxi driver wanted by the cops. When Sam Yuen becomes the psycho sex offender's next victim, Ching Fung stays by her side.

== Cast ==
=== Chan family ===
- Bobby Au-Yeung 歐陽震華 as Chan Siu-Sang 陳小生 - SIP of Child Abuse Investigations Unit. Chu So Ngo's current/former boyfriend.
- Mimi Chu 朱咪咪 as Wong Yee Mui 王二妹 - Chan Siu-Sang's sister-in-law and Chan Sam Yuen, Sei Hei, Ng Fuk's mother. She owns and manages a coffee and tea cafe.
- Joyce Tang 滕麗名 as Chan Sam Yuen 陳三元 - Chan Siu-Sang's niece and Wong Yee Mui's eldest daughter. Ching Fung's wife. Joins Chu So Ngor as WPC at 81 EUKW.
- Koey Leung 梁雪湄 as Chan Sei Hei 陳四喜 - Chan Siu-Sang's niece and Wong Yee Mui's middle daughter. Tung Ka Fai's girlfriend, then wife.
- Sherming Yiu 姚樂怡 as Chan Ng Fuk 陳五福 - Chan Siu-Sang's niece and Wong Yee Mui's youngest daughter. Au Chi Keung's girlfriend.

=== Yue family ===
- Esther Kwan 關詠荷 as Chu So Ngo 朱素娥 - Chan Siu Sang's current girlfriend. Promoted to sergeant in the Force and leads 81 EUKW. Transfers to Child Abuse Investigations Unit where she awkwardly meets Chen Siu Sang after breakup.
- Emotion Cheung 張錦程 as Yue Wing Cho 余永財 - Chu So Ngor ex-husband. Contracts AIDS and seeks treatment in the US.
- Ding Lik 丁力 as Yue Ka Lok 余家樂 - Chu So Ngor and Yue Wing Cho's 10-year-old son. Desperately wants Siu-Sang to marry his mom so Siu-Sang can be his step-dad.

=== Ching family ===
- Marco Ngai 魏駿傑 as Ching Fung 程峰 - SIP of West Kowloon RCU Team 1. Chan Sam Yuen's husband.
- Chor Yuen 楚原 as Ching Sau Chung 程守忠 - Ching Fung's father.
- Helen Ma 馬海倫 as Ho Kam Mui 何金梅 - Ching Fung's mother.

=== Police officers ===
- Timothy Siu 邵傳勇 as Au Chi Keung 歐志強
- John Tang 鄧一君 as Tung Ka Fai 童家輝
- Felix Lok 駱應鈞 as SPC Ngau Wing 牛榮
- Lo Chun Shun 魯振順 as SIP Lee 李Sir Emergency Unit Kowloon West Head
- Li Shing-cheong 李成昌 as Sergeant Bao Ding Tin 鮑頂天, Kowloon West RCU Team 1
- Ricky Lee 李子奇 as SP Ho 何Sir, Kowloon West RCU Head
- Michael Tong 唐文龍 as PC Sing Chi Ciu 成志超, Kowloon West Child Abuse Investigations Unit
- Eddie Li Gong Lung 李岡龍 as SPC Cheng Kut Yeung 鄭吉祥, Child Abuse Investigation Unit
- Jay Leung 梁詠琳 as SP Mok Oi Mei 莫愛美, Kowloon West Child Abuse Investigations Unit head
- Gregory Charles Rivers 河國榮 as SSP Wai 韋Sir, SP Mok and SP Ho superior
- Benny Chan 陳浩民 as Sheung Kin Hong 常健康, Cameo
- Denise Ho 何韻詩 as Sin Kai Sum 單解心, Cameo
- Joe Ma as SPC Leung Heung Tong 梁向東, Kowloon West RCU Team 1
- Joyce Chan 陳彥行 as PC Siu Lung Nui 小龍女

=== Others ===
- Eileen Yeow 姚瑩瑩 as Sum Yeo 沈翹
- Pal Sinn 單立文 as Cheung Suk Ming 張叔明
- Sammul Chan 陳鍵鋒 as Tim 添
- Joe Junior as Uncle Roy
- Eddie Cheung 張兆輝 as Yeung Kwong Chiu 楊光照
- Danny Summer 夏韶聲 as Yip Cheung Sing 葉長勝
- Akina Hong Wah 康華 as Yung Siu Lei 容小麗
- Andy Tai 戴志偉 as Fok Yiu Tong 霍耀東
- Ku Feng 谷峰 as Triad boss 黑社会老大
- Johnny Tang 鄧兆尊 as Tung Chak Kwong 董澤光
- Ken Lok 駱達華 as Pao Kwok Ping 鮑國平
- Law Lan 羅蘭 as Lau Seun Ho 劉順好
- Rosanne Lui 呂珊 as Chiang Sau Lan 蔣秀蘭
- Angela Tong 湯盈盈 as Hung 虹
- Gordon Liu 劉家輝 as Po Yung 蒲勇

== Casting ==
Some of the supporting actors in the first series play completely different characters in this series with no relation to the characters they previously played.
