= Summer Heat (TV series) =

- Poster
- 心慌·心郁·逐個捉
- Genre: Modern Suspense
- Starring: Joe Ma; Joyce Tang
- Opening theme: "伶仃" by Kelly Chen
- Country of origin: Hong Kong
- Original language: Cantonese
- No. of episodes: 20

Production
- Running time: 45 minutes (approx.)

Original release
- Network: TVB
- Release: June 13 – July 8, 2006

Summer Heat (Traditional Chinese: 心慌·心郁·逐個捉) is a TVB modern suspense series released overseas in January 2004 and broadcast on TVB Jade Channel in June 2006.

== Synopsis ==
It's difficult to separate truth from lies, friends from enemies.
A peaceful village is ironically full of hidden dangers!

Shui Ling (Joyce Tang) grew up with just her father and they share a strong loving bond, but as Shui Ling grew older and put more time in her work their bond grew apart. To mend this bond, Shui Ling decides to visit her home village with his father. She was to meet with her father later that night at his yacht parked at the village's shore however it suddenly exploded when she approached. Shui Ling's boyfriend, Lau Hor-Fat (Mark Kwok), a police officer and his team could not find any trace of her father's remains. Shui Ling decides to stay at her family's home in the village to see why her father keeps visiting and to see if there were any signs of her father.

She meets the village leader, Ching Nai Hoi (Joe Ma), whom keeps irritating her and they have their differences. As her days past by in the village, she suspects that the villagers may be suspects to the yacht explosion. Hor Fat later eventually friends with Shing Ling and helps her question the villagers. She begins to fall in love with him but discovers that he is hiding a secret from her that has to do with her father's disappearance...

== Cast ==
Cast	Role	Description
Joe Ma	Ching Nai Hoi 程乃海	Village Leader; Shui Ling's lover.
Joyce Tang	Shui Ling 水寧	Ching Nai Hoi's lover. Lau Hor-Fat's ex-girlfriend. Shui Wai-Choi's daughter. Vivian Lee's cousin.
Mark Kwok	Lau Hor-Fat 劉可發	Police Officer; Shui Ling's ex-boyfriend.
Victoria Jane Jolly (左慧琪)	Vivian Lee	Shui Ling's cousin.
Samuel Kwok (郭鋒)	Shui Wai-Choi 水偉才	Shui Ling's father.
Raymond Cho	Ching Tin-Chau 程天就	Ching Nai Hoi's friend.
Ching Hor Wai (程可為)	Gei Tak-Han 紀德嫻	
Law Koon Lan (羅冠蘭)	Gei Yin-Suk 紀賢淑	
Law Lan (羅蘭)	Mo Ah-Lui 巫阿女	
Sharon Chan	Fong Yau-Ho 方友好	Shui Ling's friend.
