= Armed Reaction III =

Hong Kong television series

- Promo poster
- 陀槍師姐III
- Genre: Crime thriller, Modern drama
- Created by: Hong Kong Television Broadcasts Limited
- Starring: Bobby Au-yeung; Ada Choi; Joyce Tang; Marco Ngai; Mimi Chu
- Opening theme: Human Standards 人間定格 by Sammi Cheng
- Country of origin: Hong Kong
- Original language: Cantonese
- No. of episodes: 32

Production
- Producer: Kwong Jip Sang
- Production location: Hong Kong
- Camera setup: Multi camera
- Running time: 45 minutes
- Production company: TVB

Original release
- Network: Jade
- Release: 9 July – 18 August 2001

Related
- Armed Reaction; Armed Reaction II; Armed Reaction IV; Armed Reaction 2021

Armed Reaction III
- Traditional Chinese: 陀槍師姐III
- Simplified Chinese: 陀枪师姐III
- Literal meaning: "Gun Carrying Police Women III"
Transcriptions
Standard Mandarin
- Hanyu Pinyin: tuó qiāng shī jiě III
Yue: Cantonese
- Yale Romanization: tor cheung si tze III
- Jyutping: to4 coeng1 si1 ze2 III

Armed Reaction III (Chinese: 陀槍師姐 III; Jyutping: to4 coeng1 si1 ze2 III) is a 2001 Hong Kong modern cop drama produced by TVB. The drama stars Bobby Au-yeung and Ada Choi as the main leads with Joyce Tang, Marco Ngai and Mimi Chu in main supporting roles. Original broadcast of the series began on TVB Jade channel from July 9 till August 18, 2001 at 9:30-10:30 p.m. timeslot with 32 episodes total.

== Synopsis ==
The series takes place 5 years after the 2nd installment.

Chan Siu-Sang (Bobby Au-Yeung) is single and all alone, his old love Chu So Ngo married the doctor that treated her son and left the police force. Then he meets Wai Ying Zi (Ada Choi), a rookie police officer that is under Chan Sam Yuen, West Kowloon Police Traffic unit. The two get off on the wrong foot due to misunderstandings. Wai Ying Zi who is eager to show off her skills seems to get into a lot of trouble. She is deemed reckless and rash. Later on Ying Zi joins Siu-Sang's CID unit which leads to the two bickering nonstop. After Siu-Sang saves Ying Zi's life on one their investigations she learns to respect him and the two become friends.

Chan Sam Yuen (Joyce Tang) is promoted to the Probation Inspector of the West Kowloon Police Traffic unit. She and Ching Fung (Marco Ngai) are also now parents to a pair of girl/boy twins, but their marriage is not as happy as it seems as the two continue to have quarrels in their marriage. With marital problems at home Sam Yuen becomes a cold, unreasonable and mean boss at work. When a case similar to the psychotic serial rapist in the last series arises Sam Yuen starts feeling threaten and her trauma which she thought she conquered starts to set back in, making her obsess over the investigation. Even though the culprit Bao Gwok Ping is still locked up in jail, he seems to have been communicating with someone on the outside who agreed to take on his split personality persona and continuing his crime spree. Due to Sam Yuen's carelessness her son is kidnapped and killed by the new culprit. This causes Sam Yuen and Ching Fung's marriage to be in further jeopardy when he blames her for the death of their son.

== Cast ==
=== Chan family ===
- Bobby Au-Yeung 歐陽震華 as Chan Siu-Sang 陳小生 - Senior Inspector of a CID task unit. Wai Ying Zhi's friend and mentor.
- Mimi Chu 朱咪咪 as Wong Yee Mui 王二妹 - Chan Siu-Sang's sister-in-law and Chan Sam Yuen, Sei Hei, Ng Fuk's mother. She owns and manages a coffee and tea cafe.
- Koey Leung 梁雪湄 as Chan Sei Hei 陳四喜 - Chan Siu-Sang's niece and Wong Yee Mui's middle daughter. Tung Ka Fai's girlfriend then wife.
- John Tang 鄧一君 as Tung Ka Fai 童家輝 - Chan Sei Hei's husband. A computer prodigy, he left the police cyber unit to start his own business.
- Sherming Yiu 姚樂怡 as Chan Ng Fuk 陳五福 - Chan Siu-Sang's niece and Wong Yee Mui's youngest daughter. Au Chi Keung's girlfriend.

=== Ching family ===
- Marco Ngai 魏駿傑 as Ching Fung 程峰 - Chan Sam Yuen's husband. Senior Inspector of West Kowloon RCU Team 1,
- Joyce Tang 滕麗名 as Chan Sam Yuen 陳三元 - Chan Siu-Sang's niece and Wong Yee Mui's eldest daughter. Ching Fung's wife. Probation Inspector of West Kowloon Traffic Unit.
- Chor Yuen 楚原 as Ching Sau Chung 程守忠 - Ching Fung's father.
- Helen Ma 馬海倫 as Ho Kam Mui 何金梅 - Ching Fung's mother.
- Shing Ka Ying 成珈瑩 as Ching Sa Sa 程莎莎 - Sam Yuen and Ching Fung's daughter.
- Kyle Ma 馬俊榮 as Ching Ga Ga 程嘉嘉 - Sam Yuen and Ching Fung's son.

=== Wai family ===
- Ada Choi 蔡少芬 as Wai Ying Zi 衛英姿 - The new rookie female cop. She and Chan Siu-Sang become close friends.
- Ha Ping 夏萍 as Choi Yuk Lan 蔡玉蘭 - Wai Ying Hung's ex-wife's mother and Wai Ying Zi's grandmother.
- Ha Yu 夏雨 as Wai Ying Hung 衛英雄 - Wai Ying Zi's father. Mechanic garage owner. Wong Suk Sum's love interest and later husband.
- Akina Hong Wah 康華 as Wong Suk Sum 王素心 - Former triad boss's wife. Wai Ying Hung's love interest and later wife.

=== Police officers ===
- Lo Mang 羅莽 as Pun Man Bun 潘文彬
- Li Shing-cheong 李成昌 as Sergeant Bao Ding Tin 鮑頂天
- Timothy Siu 邵傳勇 as Au Chi Keung 歐志強
- Lo Chun Shun 魯振順 as Leung Sir 梁Sir
- Eddie Li Gong Lung 李岡龍 as Cheng Gut Yeung 鄭吉祥
- Celine Ma 馬蹄露 as Chu Siu Fung 朱少芬

=== Others ===
- Joe Junior as Cheung Biu 張標
- Moses Chan 陳豪 as Chan Yiu Yeung 陳耀揚
- Jason Chu 朱永棠 as Liu Gor 了哥
- Matt Yeung 楊明 as Pun Chi Ming 潘志明
- Catherine Chau 周家怡 as Co Co
- Kenny Wong 黃德斌 as Kwok Gum On 郭錦安
- Ken Lok 駱達華 as Bao Gwok Ping 鮑國平
- Angel Sung 宋芝龄 as Zheng Siu Gyun 郑少娟
- Kenneth Ma 馬國明 as Explosive Ordinance Disposal Bureau Bomb Specialist 拆彈專家

== Casting ==
- Esther Kwan, who was the female lead in the 1st and 2nd installment does not appear in the 3rd installment because she had left TVB for rival televisions station ATV during the development of the 3rd installment. It was highly controversial that the Armed Reaction franchise be continued since one of its major stars and characters of the series was gone but TVB proceeded with the production of the 3rd installment by casting popular TVB actress Ada Choi as the new female lead. In the 1st episode, Chen Siu Sang mentioned that she was with Ka-Lok in Canada and married a doctor.
- Same as the previous installment of the series some of the supporting actors in the first two series play completely different characters in this series with no relations to the characters they previously played.
