= Country Spirit =

- 酒是故鄉醇
- Genre: Period Drama
- Starring: Gordon Lam; Charmaine Sheh; Sheren Tang; Joe Ma; Yuen Wah; Paul Chun
- Opening theme: "醇酒醉影" (The Wine of Mellow Shade) by Jacky Cheung & Kit Chan
- Ending theme: "似醉還未醉" by Jacky Cheung
- Country of origin: Hong Kong
- Original language: Cantonese
- No. of episodes: 42

Production
- Running time: 45 minutes (approx.)

Original release
- Network: TVB
- Release: October 29 – December 22, 2001

Country Spirit (Chinese: 酒是故鄉醇; lit. Wine Tastes Sweetest in One’s Hometown) is a 2001 television drama series produced by TVB. The series takes place in a winery in China in the early 1900s. The series, totaling 42 episodes, follows a widow in a ghost marriage and her husband's house servant.

The television series was filmed in a number of locations in Guangxi, including Guposhan National Forest Park, Detian waterfall, and Huangyao old town.

== Main cast ==
- Gordon Lam
- Charmaine Sheh
- Sheren Tang
- Yuen Wah
- Joe Ma
- Winnie Yeung
- Paul Chun
- Savio Tsang

=== Theme song ===
The Wine of Mellow Shade (醇酒醉影)
- Lyrics: Au Chi-sum
- Composition and Arrangement: Joseph Koo
- Performance: Jacky Cheung and Kit Chan
