= A Tough Side of a Lady =

Hong Kong television series

- Promo poster
- Also known as: Hua Mulan
- 花木蘭
- Genre: Period drama, Comedy
- Created by: Hong Kong Television Broadcasts Limited
- Written by: Mak Chi Sing 麥志誠
- Directed by: Lau Wai Wah 劉偉華
- Starring: Mariane Chan; Wong Hei; Law Kar-ying; Mimi Chu; Gigi Fu; Shirley Cheung
- Theme music composer: Jean Michael Ou
- Opening theme: Highly Praise Women 揚眉女子 by Sally Yeh 葉蒨文
- Country of origin: Hong Kong
- Original language: Cantonese
- No. of episodes: 20

Production
- Producer: Ling Jun Gwong 凌俊光
- Production location: Hong Kong
- Camera setup: Multi camera
- Running time: 45 minutes
- Production company: TVB

Original release
- Network: Jade
- Release: 12 January – 6 February 1998

A Tough Side of a Lady
- Traditional Chinese: 花木蘭
- Simplified Chinese: 花木兰
- Literal meaning: "Flower Wood Orchid"
Transcriptions
Standard Mandarin
- Hanyu Pinyin: huā mù lán
Yue: Cantonese
- Yale Romanization: Fa muk lan
- Jyutping: faa1 muk6 laan4

A Tough Side of a Lady (Chinese: 花木蘭; Jyutping: faa1 muk6 laan4) is a 1998 Hong Kong, ancient costumed comedy drama produced by TVB. The drama is a rendition of the legendary folklore of Hua Mulan, a brave girl who took her ailing father's place in the army to fight in battle. The series stars Mariane Chan as the protagonist Mulan and Wong Hei as a character created for the series. The series was aired as a Lunar New Year drama. Original broadcast of the series began on January 12 till February 6, 1998, on TVB's Jade channel, Monday–Friday during its 7:30–8:30 p.m. timeslot.

== Synopsis ==
With her father (Law Kar-ying) in the army, filial oldest daughter of the Fa family Muk Lan (Mariane Chan), has the burden of taking care of and providing for her family because her mother is dependent on others, her younger sister is immature and her younger brother is a weakling. By day she works hard selling fabric at the street market and endures through the nights to weave fabric to sell the next day.

When they receive news that their father is finally returning home the Fa family is overjoyed. Muk Lan's father tells her that while he was in the army he had made a marriage arrangement for her to marry a man named Tsui Sam Gong (Lau Wing-Kin), Muk Lan did not mind the arranged marriage since she has secretly admired Sam Gong for a long time. However Sam Gong rejected on the idea of the arranged marriage because he was already in love with Long Siu Siu (Gigi Fu), the daughter of the local government official. To avoid marry Muk Lan, Sam Gong decides to join the army.

During this time the Fa family meets Ho Go Sing (Wong Hei), who rents half of the Fa family house with his forgetful mother (Mimi Chu). Muk Lan and Go Sing starts off on bad terms as she sees him as a stingy conman and tries to evict him and his mother, but the Fa family takes pity on Go Sing's mother and decides to let them stay.

After returning from the army Muk Lan's father was to be compensated by the government for his services, but he did not receive his compensation as the local government official together with his son decided to keep the money for themselves. One night while the government official and his son was transporting the stolen money they noticed Muk Lan's father and thought he had witnessed what they were doing. Thinking Muk Lan's father had seen all their illegal activities the government official decided to draft Muk Lan's father to go to war. Muk Lan's younger brother was to enlist in the army in their father's place since their father was ailing and could no longer serve another army term, but Muk Lan's goes in his place disguised as a male because her brother is a weakling and could not take the hardship of army life. Go Sing also happens to be drafted into the army the same time as Muk Lan. He, Muk Lan and Sam Gong all end up serving in the same unit in the army.

While dressed as a male in the army Muk Lan meets Siu Siu and saves her life. For Muk Lan's heroism Siu Siu ends up falling in love with her. Sam Gong finds out that Muk Lan is the one Siu Siu loves and becomes Muk Lan's sworn enemy. He tries to sabotage Muk Lan while both are serving in the army.

== Cast ==
=== Fa family ===
- Mariane Chan 陳妙瑛 as Fa Muk Lan 花木蘭 - Dresses up as a male to enlist in the army as the Fa family representative.
- Law Kar-ying 羅家英 as Fa Wu 花弧 - Fa Muk Lan's father.
- Ma Cing Ji 馬菁宜 as Yeung Lau Zi 楊柳枝 - Fa Muk Lan's mother.
- Shirley Cheung 張玉珊 as Fa Muk Wai 花木蕙 - Fa Muk Lan's younger sister. The Fa family middle child.
- Willie Wai Kar Hung 韋家雄 as Fa Muk Dai 花木棣 - Fa Muk Lan's younger brother. The Fa family youngest child.
- Yip Zan Sing 葉振聲 as Fa Ming 花明 - Fa Muk Lan's male cousin.

=== Ho family ===
- Wong Hei 王喜 as Ho Go Sing 賀高陞 - Rents half of the Fa family's home. Ends up enlisting in the army the same time as Muk Lan.
- Mimi Chu 朱咪咪 as Leung Hung Mui 梁紅梅 - Ho Go Sing's forgetful mother.
- Peter Lai 黎彼得 as Ho Lai 賀禮 - Ho Go Sing's father. He is a con artist.

=== Tsui family ===
- Lau Wing-Kin 劉永健 as Tsui Sam Gong 徐三綱 - To avoid his arranged marriage to Muk Lan he joins the army.
- Cheung Ying Choi 張英才 as Tsui Ding Hong 徐定康 - Sam Gong's father.
- Pak Yan 白茵 as Yeung Chui Wan 楊翠環 - Sam Gong's nanny.

=== Long family ===
- Wong Wai 王偉 as Long Tak Lei 郎德利 - Corrupt government official.
- Helen Ma 馬海倫 as Lee Yuk Lin 李玉蓮 - Long Tak Lei's wife. Long Yen and Siu Siu's mother.
- Stephen Ho Kai Nam 何啓南 as Long Yan 郎仁 - Long Tak Lei's son and Siu Siu's older brother.
- Gigi Fu 傅明憲 as Long Siu Siu 郎小小 - Thinking Muk Lan is a male, falls in love with her.
- Angel Sung Chih Ling 宋芝齡 as Siu Tou 小桃 - Long Siu Siu's personal maid.
- Cheung Hak 蔣克 as Long family servant

=== Army ===
- Wong Ching 王青 as Minister Tso Gwan 曹軍
- Tam Yut Ching 譚一清 as Captain Lee Gwong 李廣
- Dickson Li Ka Sing 李家聲 as Ng Chau Sui 吳秋水
- King Kong Lam 林敬剛 as Ng Yun Juk 吳願旭
- Elton Loo 羅君左 as Bou Fei 布飛
- Man Yeung Ching Wah 楊證樺 as Soldier 第一隊兵
- Ngai Wai Man 魏惠文 as Soldier 第一隊兵

=== Imperial court ===
- Chun Wong 秦煌 as Emperor 皇上
- Danny Summer 夏韶聲 as Emperor's younger brother 皇弟
