= Armed Reaction =

Hong Kong television series

- Promo poster
- 陀槍師姐
- Genre: Crime thriller, Modern drama
- Created by: Hong Kong Television Broadcasts Limited
- Starring: Bobby Au-yeung; Esther Kwan; Joyce Tang; Marco Ngai; Mimi Chu
- Opening theme: Amazing Women 女人本色 by Sammi Cheng
- Country of origin: Hong Kong
- Original language: Cantonese
- No. of episodes: 20

Production
- Producer: Kwong Jip Sang
- Production location: Hong Kong
- Camera setup: Multi camera
- Running time: 45 minutes
- Production company: TVB

Original release
- Network: Jade
- Release: 6 July – 31 July 1998

Armed Reaction
- Traditional Chinese: 陀槍師姐
- Simplified Chinese: 陀枪师姐
- Literal meaning: "Gun Carrying Police Women"
Transcriptions
Standard Mandarin
- Hanyu Pinyin: tuó qiāng shī jiě
Yue: Cantonese
- Yale Romanization: tor cheung si tze
- Jyutping: to4 coeng1 si1 ze2

Armed Reaction (Chinese: 陀槍師姐; Jyutping: to4 coeng1 si1 ze2) is a 1998 Hong Kong modern cop drama produced by TVB. The drama stars Bobby Au-yeung and Esther Kwan as the main leads with Joyce Tang, Marco Ngai, Mimi Chu and Joe Ma in main supporting roles. Original broadcast of the series began on TVB Jade channel from July 6 till July 31, 1998 at 9:30-10:30 p.m. timeslot with 20 episodes total.

The popularity of the drama spawned 4 sequels (Armed Reaction II, Armed Reaction III, Armed Reaction IV, and Armed Reaction 2021).

In mainland China, the drama title is "女警本色", which means "The True Colour of Policewomen". While in Taiwan, the first season was under the title "麻辣女刑警" which means "Spicy Female Cops", but has followed the original Hong Kong title for the sequels. The reason for the change in title in each region release is to accommodate the local slang.

== Synopsis ==
The drama takes place before 1997 Handover of Hong Kong and Royal Hong Kong Police revolves around the lives of two police woman, one who works leisurely behind desk duty but has to take her job more seriously once her husband leaves her and a new rookie cop who is deemed too ambitious and rash by her superior.

Chu So-Ngo (Esther Kwan) never took her job seriously. She works leisurely behind the desk at the police station waiting for the day to end so she can go home to her loving husband and obedient young son. Her job at the police station is just for her to kill time and make spare money for her to spend. However, things took an unexpected turn when her boss's wife thought So-Ngo was having an affair with her husband and had her transferred to the Patrol Unit. Soon she also learns her happy marriage is not as perfect as it seems when she finds out her husband has a kept mistress up in mainland China and plans to divorce her so he can marry his pregnant mistress. No longer living carefree, So-Ngo has to worry about paying the bills and taking care of her son by herself. She decides to switch for desk duty to on the beat duties because of the better pay. As a beat officer she gets to know Inspector Chan Siu-Sang (Bobby Au-Yeung) better. The two have a close friendship and soon starts developing feelings for each other, but their relationship is put on hold when her ex-husband wants her back.

Chan Siu-Sang niece Chan Sam-Yuen, is a tomboy who has always dreamt of becoming a cop like her uncle. Since she is so active in her job her superior Ching Fung writes her up for being to ambitious and unruly. Chan Siu-Sang being more senior than Ching Fung decides to stand up for his niece and tells Fung to be a better superior instead. While always bickering with each other Sam-Yuen and Fung soon find out they also have a lot of the same interests. When Fung's girlfriend leaves him for her ex-boyfriend whom she starts seeing after moving to France for school, Fung soon starts to fall for Sam-Yuen.

Later when Siu-Sang is framed for a crime he didn't commit. Sam-Yuen must decide whether to arrest him or let him go so he can find evidence to bring the real culprit to justice.

== Cast ==
=== Chan family ===
- Bobby Au-Yeung 歐陽震華 as Chan Siu-Sang 陳小生 - IP. His CID career ended when a criminal shot him in the foot. His parents died when he was young, he was raised by his sister-in-law Wong Yee Mui. He is now working as a Firearms Officer with the CID.
- Mimi Chu 朱咪咪 as Wong Yee Mui 王二妹 - Chan Siu-Sang's sister-in-law and Chan Sam Yuen, Sei Hei, Ng Fuk's mother. When her husband died she raised his younger brother and her three daughters alone.
- Joyce Tang 滕麗名 as Chan Sam Yuen 陳三元 - Chan Siu-Sang's niece and Wong Yee Mui's eldest daughter. An ambitious rookie female cop who puts her life at risk because of her devotion to her job. Patrols for the Yau Ma Tei Police Station's Sub-Patrol Unit then transfers to Ching Fung's RCU Team 1 along with Chu So Ngor.
- Koey Leung 梁雪湄 as Chan Sei Hei 陳四喜 - Chan Siu-Sang's niece and Wong Yee Mui's middle daughter.
- Sherming Yiu 姚樂怡 as Chan Ng Fuk 陳五福 - Chan Siu-Sang's niece and Wong Yee Mui's youngest daughter.

=== Yue family (After Yue Wing Choi's divorce with Chu So Ngor, it is now the Chu family) ===
- Esther Kwan 關詠荷 as Chu So Ngor 朱素娥 - A desk duty police officer who lived a carefree life until her life is turned upside down in a short period of time when she is transferred to the patrol unit and her husband leaves her for another woman.
- Emotion Cheung 張錦程 as Yue Wing Choi 余永財 - Chu So Ngo husband then ex-husband. He leaves his wife and son for his pregnant mainland mistress.
- Ting Lik 丁力 as Yue Ka Lok 余家樂 - Chu So Ngor and Yue Wing Choi's 10-year-old son. He forms a close friendship with Chan Siu-Sang when his father leaves the family.

=== Ching family ===
- Marco Ngai 魏駿傑 as Ching Fung 程峰 - IP of RCU Team 1. Chan Sam Yuen's superior and later boyfriend.
- Chor Yuen 楚原 as Ching Sau Chung 程守忠 - Ching Fung's father.
- Helen Ma 馬海倫 as Ho Kam Mui 何金梅 - Ching Fung's mother.

=== West Kowloon CID ===
- Kwok Tak Shun 郭德信 as Kwok Sir 郭Sir
- Leung Kin Ping 梁健平 as Peter
- Lee Chi Kei 李子奇 as Superintendent Ho 何Sir
- Joe Ma 馬德鐘 as Leung Heung Dong 梁向東
- Timothy Siu 邵傳勇 as Au Chi Keung 歐志強
- Li Shing-cheong 李成昌 as Sergeant Pao Ting Tin 鮑頂天
- Ben Wong Tin-Dok 黃天鐸 as Superintendent Wong 黃Sir
- Chan Dik Hak 陳狄克 as Station Sergeant (Briefing officer in episode 1) 時沙
- Mok Ka Yiu 莫家堯 as Kwan Sir 關Sir

=== Criminals and suspects ===
- Ching Siu Lung 程小龍 as Cheng Chung Yee 鄭忠義
- Willie Wai Kar Hung 韋家雄 as Cheng Chung Seon 鄭忠信
- Akina Hong Wah 康華 as Wong Wai Sum 王慰心
- Johnson Law 羅莽 as Cheung Pau 張炮
- Koo Ming Wah 古明華 as Cheung Ming Wah 張明華
- Angela Tong 湯盈盈 as Siu Ding 小丁
- Candy Chiu 趙靜儀 as Ma Siu Ling 馬小玲
- Ricky Wong Chun Tong 王俊棠 as Nip Sai Guen 聶世官
- Josephine Lam 林其欣 as Yuen Siu Bik 袁小碧

== Criticism ==
The show has come under attack for reusing story lines, recycling characters and actors and having illogical sequencing in storylines.
