= A Handful of Love (TV series) =

TV drama

- Promo poster
- 一屋兩家三姓人
- Genre: Modern Drama
- Starring: Joe Ma; Jessica Hsuan; Don Li
- Opening theme: "打氣" by Don Li
- Country of origin: Hong Kong
- Original language: Cantonese
- No. of episodes: 20

Production
- Running time: 45 minutes (approx.)

Original release
- Network: TVB
- Release: June 21 – July 16, 2004

A Handful Of Love (Chinese: 一屋兩家三姓人) is a TVB drama starring Joe Ma and Jessica Hsuan. The drama talks about an uncle taking care of his nephews/nieces because his sister and brother-in-law died. But the kids don't know that their parents are dead.

== Cast ==
- Joe Ma (馬德鐘) as Koo Ka Yuen (顧家源), a family man, Kuk Wai Ting's husband, and the Fong kids' uncle
- Jessica Hsuan (宣萱) as Kuk Wai Ting (谷慧庭), a director, Koo Ka Yuen's wife, the Fong kids' aunt, Laura
- Don Li (李逸朗) as Fong Wing Yan (方穎仁), the big brother in the Fong kids, Koo Ka Yuen and Kuk Wai Ting's nephew
- Rachel Poon (潘曉彤) as Fong Wing Yee (方穎儀), the older sister in the Fong kids (second oldest), Koo Ka Yuen and Kuk Wai Ting's niece
- Oscar Poon (潘 迪) as Fong Wing Lai (方穎禮), the third oldest of the Fong kids, Koo Ka Yuen and Kuk Wai Ting's nephew
- Kevin Yau (丘梓宏) as Fong Wing Chi (方穎智), the second youngest in the Fong kids, Koo Ka Yuen and Kuk Wai Ting's nephew
- Tiffany Tse (謝宛婷) as Fong Wing Sun (方穎信), the youngest of the Fong kids, and Koo Ka Yuen and Kuk Wai Ting's niece
- Mimi Lo (羅敏莊) as Lo Yim Fun (羅艷芬), Fong Wing Lai's and Fong Wing Chi's homeroom teacher
- Kiki Lam (林子萱) as Liu Yan Yan (廖茵茵), Fong Wing Yan's girlfriend
- Johnson Lee (李思捷) as Chu Kwok Leung (朱國亮), Koo Ka Yuen's best friend, and a scriptwriter

== Show Motto ==
The show's motto (mostly used in ads) is "Contrary to popular belief, more than a handful is NOT a waste".
