= Nicola Cheung =

Chinese actress and singer (born 1976)

- Born: Nicola Cheung Sun Yuet; 31 May 1976 (age 50); Hong Kong
- Citizenship: Hong Kong
- Education: University of Hong Kong (LLB, 1997)
- Occupations: Actress; singer
- Years active: 1997–2005
- Spouse: Jeremy Young (m. 2007)
- Children: Lucy Young (b. 2009), Lily Young (b. 2010), Leah Young (b. 2014), Fourth daughter (b. 2018)

Chinese name
- Traditional Chinese: 張燊悅
- Simplified Chinese: 张燊悦
Transcriptions
Standard Mandarin
- Hanyu Pinyin: Zhāng Shènyuè
Yue: Cantonese
- Jyutping: Cheung^{1} Sam^{1}yuet

Nicola Cheung Sun Yuet (張燊悅; born 31 May 1976) is a retired Hong Kong actress and singer, best known for her work in TVB television dramas during the late 1990s and early 2000s.

== Life and career ==
=== 1976–1997: Early life and education ===
Cheung was born on 31 May 1976 in Hong Kong. She completed her secondary education locally and later attended the University of Hong Kong, graduating with a Bachelor of Laws (LLB) degree in 1997.

=== 1997–1998: Film and media debut ===
Cheung began her acting career in films, appearing in The Wedding Days (1997) as Joyce, He Comes From Planet K (1997) as Carol, and Cause We Are So Young (1997) as herself. She continued with roles in City of Glass (1998) and Twelve Nights (2000).

=== 1999–2005: TVB career ===
In 1999, Cheung joined TVB and gained recognition for her portrayal of Princess Sun Yuet in Dragon Love (人龍傳說). She also starred in Feminine Masculinity (先生貴性, 1999), Aiming High (撻出愛火花, 2000), FM701 (2000), and Reaching Out (美麗人生, 2001). In 2002, she appeared in the drama Feel 100% (百分百感覺). It would be her last drama with TVB as she would focus only on her movie career afterwards.

During this period, Cheung also pursued a music career, releasing albums including 一不小心 (2001), 再不小心 (2001), and Angel of Mercy (2002).

=== 2005–2007: Retirement and marriage ===
After leaving TVB, Cheung focused on movies for another three years before retiring in 2005 to focus on her personal life. She married businessman Jeremy Young in 2007.

=== 2009–present: Civilian and family life ===
Retired from the entertainment industry, Nicola focused on developing and growing her family with Jeremy. The couple has four daughters: Lucy (born 2009), Lily (born 2010), Leah (born 2014), and a fourth daughter (born 2018). Cheung has remained out of the public eye since retiring from acting.

In January 2023, Cheung experienced an emotional moment when her 13-year-old daughter underwent surgery and spent 10 days in a coma. The child made a full recovery.

== Filmography ==
=== Film ===
Year	English Title	Role
1997	The Wedding Days	Joyce
1997	He Comes From Planet K	Carol
1997	Cause We Are So Young	Nicola
1998	City of Glass	Susie
2000	Twelve Nights	Clara
2002	Interactive Murders	Shana
2002	Love Is Butterfly	Funny
2003	Autumn Diary	Wing E
2003	Snow Falling From The Sky Of June	Lok Wah
2004	Magic Kitchen	Kwai
2004	Can't Shout Out	Lan
2005	Wait 'Til You're Older	Miss Wong
2005	Demoniac Flash	Mei
2005	It Had to Be You!	Moon
2005	Wondrous Bet	Mei

=== Television series ===
Year	English Title	Chinese Title	Role
1999	Dragon Love	人龍傳說	Princess Sun Yuet
1999	Feminine Masculinity	先生貴性	Sardonna Fong
2000	Aiming High	撻出愛火花	Lo Jing Jing
2000	FM701	FM701	Da Bei Ah Un
2001	Reaching Out	美麗人生	Ko Wai Ting
2002	Feel 100%	百分百感覺	Girl Friend in the Dream

== Discography ==
Year	Song title
2001	"一不小心"
2001	"再不小心"
2002	"Angel of Mercy"
