= Mimi Chu =

Malaysian-born Hong Kong actress and singer (born 1954)

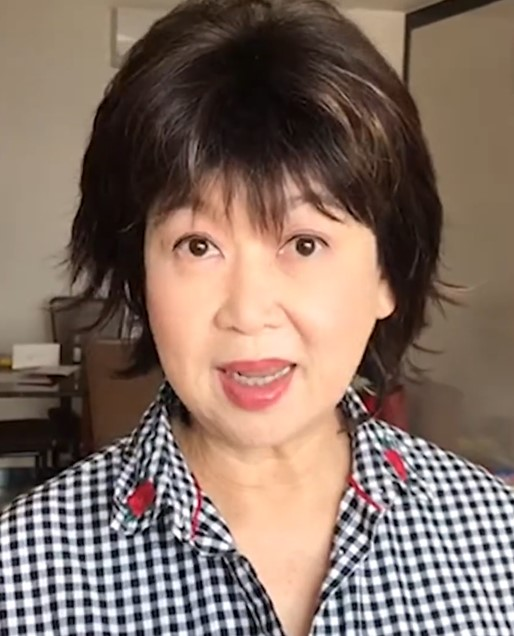
- Chu in 2018
- Born: Choo Yit Mei; 26 October 1954 (age 71); Ipoh, Perak, Malaysia
- Citizenship: Malaysia
- Occupations: Actress; singer; host
- Years active: 1970–present
- Musical career
- Origin: Malaysia
- Genres: Cantopop; Mandopop

Stage name
- Traditional Chinese: 朱咪咪
- Simplified Chinese: 朱咪咪
- Hanyu Pinyin: Zhū Mīmī
- Jyutping: Zyu¹ Mi¹ Mi⁴
- Hokkien POJ: Chu Mi-mi
- Tâi-lô: Tsu Mi-mi

Birth name
- Traditional Chinese: 朱月美
- Simplified Chinese: 朱月美
- Jyutping: Zyu1 Jyut6 Mei5
- Hokkien POJ: Chu Goa̍t-bí
- Tâi-lô: Tsu Gua̍t-bí

Mimi Chu (born Choo Yit Mei; 26 October 1954) is a Malaysian-born Hong Kong actress and singer. She lived in Singapore before moving to Hong Kong. She has appeared at many events. As an actress, she is a recognised face in Hong Kong and Southeast Asia having appeared in both Hong Kong and Singaporean productions.

Mimi still owns a HDB flat in Singapore and her children are educated in Singapore. Her older brother is the founder and chairman of a listed company in Singapore. She is the sister-in-law of Hong Kong actor and former policeman Joe Ma.

== Filmography ==
=== Film ===
- Redemption (2025)
- King of Hawkers (2024)
- Reunion Dinner (2022)
- A Moment of Happiness (2020)
- A House of Happiness (2018)
- Secrets in the Hot Spring (2018)
- Kidnap Ding Ding Don (2016)
- Magic Barber (2015)
- King of Mahjong (2015)
- Money Game (2015)
- Kiasu (2014)
- Eternal Love (2014)
- Delete My Love (2014)
- Mr. & Mrs. Gambler (2013)
- I Love Hong Kong 2012 (2012)
- Twisted (2011)
- The China's Next Top Princess (2005)
- Dragon Reloaded (2005)
- Sixty Million Dollar Man (1995)
- Fight Back to School III (1993)
- Justice, My Foot! (1992)

=== Television series ===
- Armed Reaction 2021 (TVB, 2021)
- My Ages Apart (TVB, 2017)
- Ghost of Relativity (TVB, 2015)
- Raising the Bar (TVB, 2015)
- Officer Geomancer (TVB, 2014–2015)
- Come On, Cousin (TVB, 2014)
- The Day of Days (TVB, 2013)
- Coffee Cat Mama (TVB, 2013)
- Inbound Troubles (TVB, 2013)
- Divas in Distress (TVB, 2012)
- The Greatness of a Hero (TVB, 2012)
- Wish and Switch (TVB, 2012)
- Ghetto Justice (TVB, 2011)
- A Tale of 2 Cities (MediaCorp, 2011)
- Only You (TVB, 2011)
- Growing Through Life (TVB, 2010)
- Beauty Knows No Pain (TVB, 2010)
- Gun Metal Grey (TVB, 2010)
- A Bride for a Ride (TVB, 2009)
- When Easterly Showers Fall on the Sunny West (TVB, 2008)
- Word Twisters' Adventures (TVB, 2007)
- The Ultimate Crime Fighter (TVB, 2007)
- Oh Mother! (Mediacorp, 2005)
- Baby Blues (2005)
- Home in Toa Payoh (MediaCorp Channel 8, 2003 – 2004)
- Beautiful Connection (MediaCorp, 2002)
- A Tough Side of a Lady (TVB, 1998)
- Wars of Bribery (TVB, 1996)
