= Joyce Tang =

Hong Kong actress

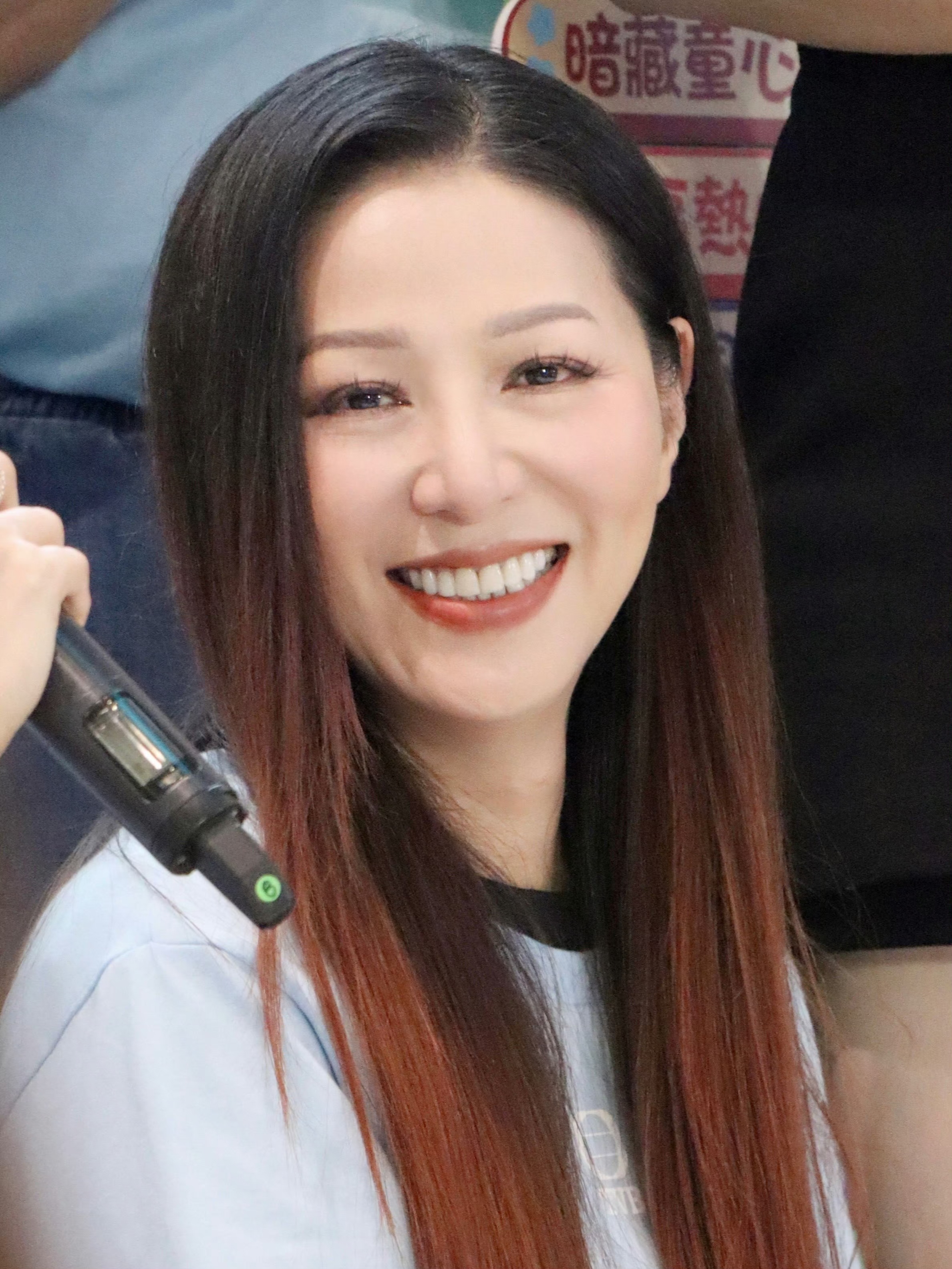
- Tang in 2025
- Born: 20 January 1976 (age 50); British Hong Kong
- Occupation: Actress
- Years active: 1995–present
- Spouse: Matthew Chu (m. 2013)
- Awards: TVB Star Award for Favourite Supporting Actress; 2017 House of Spirits

Chinese name
- Traditional Chinese: 滕麗名
- Simplified Chinese: 滕丽名
Transcriptions
Standard Mandarin
- Hanyu Pinyin: Téng Lìmíng
Yue: Cantonese
- Yale Romanization: Tàhng Laih-mìhng

Joyce Tang Lai-ming (simplified Chinese: 滕丽名; traditional Chinese: 滕麗名; born 20 January 1976) is a Hong Kong actress. Entered the career with participated at New Talent Singing Awards in 1995, she is best known to viewers as a tough woman mostly due to her characters in dramas, particularly her role as Chan Sam-yuen in Armed Reaction (1998). In 2017, she starred as Hung Sheung-sin in Come Home Love: Lo and Behold, the longest-running drama show in Hong Kong television history.

== Filmography ==
=== TV series ===
Year	Title	Role	Notes
1995	A Kindred Spirit	Sharon Leung Ping Suet	
1996	Mutual Affection	A Hung	Guest star
1996	Money Just Can't Buy	Carmen Sum Ka Man	
1997	Old Time Buddy	Chan Yuk Chun	
1997	Triumph Over Evil	Lung Ching Ching	
1998	Armed Reaction	Chan Sam Yuen	
1998	Old Time Buddy: To Catch a Thief	Lina Yiu Lai Na	
1998	As Sure As Fate	Moyung Fei	
1999	Detective Investigation Files IV	Wan Chau Yuet	
1999	The Flying Fox of the Snowy Mountain 1999	Nip Song Ching	
2000	A Matter of Customs	Elsa Wan Pui Ling	
2000	Armed Reaction II	Chan Sam Yuen	Nominated - TVB Anniversary Award for Best Actress
2001	The Heaven Sword & the Dragon Sabre 2000	Yeung Bat Fui / Gei Hiu Fu	
2001	A Taste of Love	Sue So Mei	
2001	A Step into the Past	Sin Yau	Nominated - TVB Anniversary Award for Best Actress
2001	Armed Reaction III	Chan Sam Yuen	Nominated - TVB Anniversary Award for Best Actress
2002	Invisible Journey	Tina Ching Sze Man	Nominated - TVB Anniversary Award for Best Actress
2003	Witness to a Prosecution II	Yong Tan Fong	Nominated - TVB Anniversary Award for Best Actress
2003	The Driving Power	Hung Min	Nominated - TVB Anniversary Award for Best Actress
2003	Ups and Downs in the Sea of Love	Christine Ting Ka Ka	Nominated - TVB Anniversary Award for Best Actress
2004	Summer Heat	Celine Sui Ning	Warehoused and broadcast in 2006
2004	Armed Reaction IV	Chan Sam Yuen	Nominated - TVB Anniversary Award for Best Actress
2005	The Prince's Shadow	Empress Gai	Nominated - TVB Anniversary Award for Best Supporting Actress
2005	Women on the Run	Bobo Ma Siu Bo	Nominated - TVB Anniversary Award for Best Actress
2006	Below the Lion Rock 2006		
2006	Placebo Cure	Ying Ling San	
2008	Wars of In-Laws II	Coco Ko Ka Bo	Nominated - TVB Anniversary Award for Best Supporting Actress
2008	Wasabi Mon Amour	Bobo Tam Po Po	
2008	The Money-Maker Recipe	Janet Ku Ka Chun	
2009	The King of Snooker	Toni Chin To To	
2009	Just Love II	Cally Ho Sau Sau	Nominated - TVB Anniversary Award for Best Supporting Actress
2010	Sisters of Pearl	So Lai-Sheung	
2010	Beauty Knows No Pain	Bibi Yu Man-yau	Nominated - TVB Anniversary Award for My Favourite Female Character
2011	Ghetto Justice	Tai Ng-ting	Nominated - TVB Anniversary Award for Best Supporting Actress
2011-2012	Til Love Do Us Lie	Mabel Kan Yik Dan	
2012	L'Escargot	Mandy Lee Man-wah	
2013	Awfully Lawful	Tina Ku Ka-ting	
2014	Queen Divas	Kwok Fei-fei	Nominated - TVB Anniversary Award for Best Theme Song
2014	ICAC Investigators 2014	Cheung Man Fung	
2015	My "Spiritual" Ex-Lover	Ying Chun-Fa	
2016	Presumed Accidents	Jessie Hui Kit-ying	
2016	House of Spirits	Po Yan	Nominated - TVB Anniversary Award for Best Supporting Actress; Nominated - TVB Anniversary Award for My Favourite Female Character; Nominated - TVB Anniversary Award for Most Popular Onscreen Partnership
2017-now	Come Home Love: Lo and Behold	Hung Seung Sin	Nominated - TVB Anniversary Award for Best Supporting Actress (2017); Nominated - TVB Anniversary Award for Best Supporting Actress (2018); Nominated - TVB Anniversary Award for Best Actress (2020)
2019	ICAC Investigators 2019	Flora	
2021	Armed Reaction 2021	Sammy Chan Sam Yuen	

=== Films ===
- Back to the Past (2025)
- 72 Tenants of Prosperity (2010)
- Slim till Dead (2005)
- The Untold Story - The Lost World (2002)
- Prison on Fire - Preacher (2002)
- Those Were the Days (1996)
- Lost and Found (1996)

=== Host ===
Year	Title	Notes
2016	Spirits On Vacation 一屋老友去旅行	
2017	Bazaar Carnivals 街市遊樂團	Nominated - TVB Anniversary Award for Best Host (2017); Nominated - TVB Anniversary Award for Best Host (2018)

== Personal life ==
After working together in the series Armed Reaction in 1998, Joyce and Marco Ngai started dating and had a 9-year relationship. At that time, Hong Kong fans and entertainment were waiting for a wedding of the century from a beautiful love story, she suddenly announced her breakup. The reason was that Marco betrayed her and came to a young actress Zhang Lihua. He was turned away by everyone and even affected his career.

Later, Joyce - after the cooperation in the movie Wars of In-Laws II - also dated the talented actor Derek Kok in 2007. But it wasn't long before the media exposed his private life, from which she knew the fact that he had a wife and children that had been hidden for so long. Immediately, Joyce ended her relationship with Derek.

On December 7, 2013, Joyce married businessman Matthew Chu in Thailand after a period of dating through the recommendation of friends. She and her husband decided that they will not have children. In order to spend more time enjoying life with her husband and friends, Joyce now only participates in sitcom Come Home Love: Lo and Behold as character Hung Sheung Sin.

== Awards ==
- Astro Wah Lai Toi Drama Award 2004 (Malaysia)
- Favourite character (1 of 10): Chan Sam Yun (Armed Reaction IV)
- Favourite children's song awards
