= Joe Ma (actor) =

Hong Kong actor

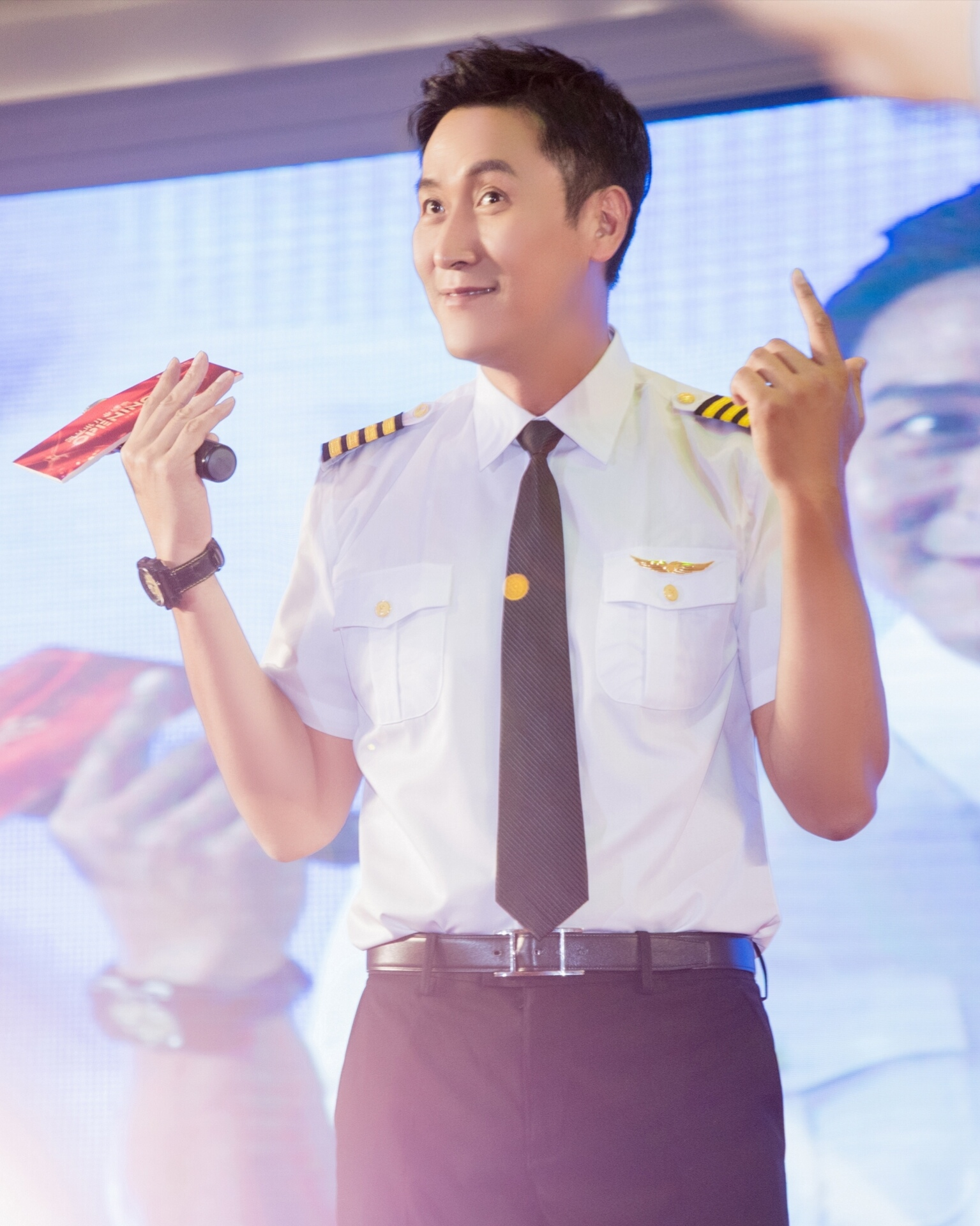
- Ma in 2018
- Born: Hong Kong
- Occupations: Actor; model; former police officer
- Years active: 1991–present
- Spouse: Cheung Siu Lan (m. 1993)
- Children: Ma Zai Xiang
- Awards: TVB Anniversary Awards – Best Actor; 2018 Life on the Line

Chinese name
- Traditional Chinese: 馬德鐘
- Simplified Chinese: 马德钟
Transcriptions
Standard Mandarin
- Hanyu Pinyin: Mǎ Dézhōng
Yue: Cantonese
- Jyutping: maa5 dak1 zung1
- Website: Official Website

Joe Ma Tak-chung (Chinese: 馬德鐘) is a Hong Kong TVB actor and former model. He is best known for his roles in numerous television series produced by TVB, often portraying authoritative figures such as police officers, detectives, and professionals. His notable works include "Triumph in the Skies" (2003), "Maiden's Vow" (2006), "Tiger Cubs" (2012), and "Life on the Line" (2018), for which he won the TVB Anniversary Award for Best Actor.

He was a policeman before he joined the Hong Kong entertainment industry in 1993. He was a member of the elite G4.

Ma is one of a few Hong Kong actors who are former members of Hong Kong law enforcement or colonial services.

== Early life ==
Before entering the entertainment industry, Ma was a member of the Hong Kong Police Force, as a member of the elite VIP Protection Unit, also known as G4.

He was scouted for modelling in the early 1990s and joined the entertainment industry as a fashion model. After that he joined TVB after being scouted by them.

== Career ==
Ma began his acting career in the early 1990s, playing minor and supporting roles. He cites his performance in the 1999 television series At the Threshold of an Era as when he felt that his acting skills had matured. This role gave Ma a breakthrough and started getting him more opportunities and finally landed his first leading role.

His performance as an airline pilot in the 2003 television series Triumph in the Skies is widely considered his breakthrough role, bringing him critical attention and establishing him as a household name.

Throughout the 2000s, he became one of TVB's most recognisable leading actors, frequently cast in roles that leveraged his authoritative presence. His most iconic roles include:

- Triumph in the Skies (2003) as Vincent, a charismatic airline pilot.
- Revolving Doors of Vengeance (2005) as Ko Fung (Martin).
- Tiger Cubs (2012) as Chin Hon To.
- Life on the Line (2018) as Man Choi Tin, a paramedic.

Despite his popularity and critical acclaim, Ma was nominated for the Best Actor award 16 times over 15 years before finally winning.

After focusing on projects in mainland China, he returned to TVB and won the TVB Anniversary Award for Best Actor in 2018 for his complex portrayal of a paramedic in Life on the Line.

In 2021, Ma and his son Ma Zai Xiang, performed on the television series The Kwoks And What.

== Filmography ==
=== Films ===
- Defiance (2019)
- Line Walker 2: Invisible Spy (2019)
- Bye! Mr. Wang (2019)
- Out of Inferno (2013)
- 72 Tenants of Prosperity (2010)
- Night Security Guard (2003)
- Taxi Driver (2002)
- Cop Shop Babes (2001)
- Tough Cop Inside (2001)
- Clean My Name, Mr. Coroner! (2000)
- Desirous Express (2000)
- Home for a Villain (2000)
- The Hong Kong happy man 2 (2000)
- The Hong Kong happy man (2000)
- Killers from Beijing (2000)
- Marooned (2000)
- Point of No Return (2000)
- Untouchable Maniac (2000)
- Body Weapon (1999)
- The Evil of a Woman Heart (1999)
- The House of No Man (1999)
- My Heart Will Go On (1999)
- Unexpectable Killing (1999)
- The Victim (1999)
- Raped by an Angel 2: The Uniform Fan (1998)
- Step into the Dark (1998)
- Till Death Do Us Part (1998)
- A True Mob Story (1998)
- How to Meet the Lucky Stars (1996)
- Lost and Found (1996)

=== TV dramas ===
Year	Title	Role
1993	The Heroes from Shaolin 武尊少林	Tit Chue
1994	Fate of the Clairvoyant 再見亦是老婆	Morgan
1994	The Legend of the Condor Heroes 射鵰英雄傳	Chan Yuen Fung
1994	Glittering Moments; CATWALK俏佳人	Chi Kin
1994	Happy Harmony 餐餐有宋家	Ng Kai Wah
1994	File of Justice III 壹號皇庭III	Dicky
1995	A Kindred Spirit 真情	Edmond
1995	Detective Investigation Files 刑事偵緝檔案	Tang Fung
1995	The Romance of the White Hair Maiden 白髮魔女傳	Chu Seung-lok
1995	A Good Match for Heaven 天降奇缘	Lee Keng Ho
1995	When a Man Loves a Woman 新同居關係	Sam
1996	Journey to the West 西遊記	Erlang Shen
1996	ICAC Investigators 1996 廉政行動1996	Steve Lung
1996	One Good Turn Deserves Another 地獄天使	Luk Kit Yue
1997	A Road and a Will 香港人在廣州	Peter
1997	Untraceable Evidence 鑑證實錄	Manfred
1998	Burning Flame 烈火雄心	Wong Jun Fatt
1998	Armed Reaction 陀槍師姐	Kwan Lo
1998	Journey to the West II 西遊記（貳）	Erlang Shen
1999	Detective Investigation Files IV 刑事偵緝檔案IV	Alex
1999	Man's Best Friend 寵物情緣	Sam
1999	A Matter of Business 千里姻緣兜錯圈	Ken
1999	At the Threshold of an Era 創世紀	Yip Wing Jun
2000	At the Threshold of an Era II 創世紀II天地有情	Yip Wing Jun
2000	Armed Reaction II 陀槍師姐II	Kwan Lo
2000	ICAC Investigators 2000 廉政行動2000	
2000	Crimson Sabre 碧血劍	
2001	The Awakening Story 婚前昏後	Fong Sing Heem 方誠謙
2001	A Taste of Love 美味情緣	Long Chi Sun (Gorden) 龍賜新
2001	Country Spirit 酒是故鄉醇	Go Gai Sung 古桂生
2002	Let's Face It 無考不成冤家	Tam Tin Yan 談天恩
2002	Eternal Happiness 再生緣	Tit Muk Ee 鐵木真
2003	Vigilante Force 智勇新警界	Ma Hao Yeen (Ken) 馬孝賢
2003	Triumph in the Skies 衝上雲宵	Ling Wan Chi 凌雲志
2004	Summer Heat 心慌·心郁·逐個捉	Ching Nai Hoi 程乃海
2004	Lady Fan 烽火奇遇結良緣	Sit Ding San 薛丁山
2004	A Handful of Love 一屋兩家三姓人	Koo Ka Yuen 顧家源
2004	Sunshine Heartbeat 赤沙印記@四葉草2	Volleyball Coach Cheung
2005	Strike at Heart	Chu-Kot Zheng Ngo
2005	The Gateau Affairs 情迷黑森林	Ko Gan 高根
2005	Revolving Doors of Vengeance 酒店風雲	Ko Fung (Martin) 高峰
2006	Maiden's Vow	Yu Chi / Lee Kat Cheung / Dai Lab Yan / Fong Ka On (K.O.)
2006	The Conquest	King Fuchai of Wu
2007	The Drive of Life	Ngai Wing Biu
2008	Catch Me Now	Kong Yeung
2008	When Easterly Showers Fall on the Sunny West	Poon Cheuk Hing/Muk Hing
2009	Born Rich	Ko Tok Man (Topman)
2010	Suspects in Love	Ng Chung Ming
2010	Beauty Knows No Pain	Ko Ji-lik (Nick)
2011	Relic of an Emissary	Chu Tai
2011	Ad Mania	Liu Chuangqi
2011	Song of Spring and Autumn	Yiwu (Duke Hui of Jin)
2012	Tiger Cubs	Chin Hon To
2012	The Legend of Xishi	King Goujian of Yue
2013	Under the Same Roof	
2014-2015	Tiger Cubs II	Chin Hon-to
2015	Smooth Talker	Hau Tak-sze
2017	Xuan-Yuan Sword Legend: The Clouds of Han	Zhang Han
2018	Life on the Line	Mak Choi-tin 麥在田
2021	Shadow of Justice	Archie Tai Ching-kwan 戴政君
2021	The Kwoks And Whats	Duncan Kwok Tak-kan 郭得勤
2021	Flying Tiger 3	Chin Bok-man 展博文
2022	Stranger Anniversary	Albert Ko Sau-shing 高收成 / Mo Kei-nam 巫祺男
2022	The Perfect Man	Yeung Yat-ching 陽日正
2024	In Bed With A Stranger	Sam Yeung Man-sum 楊萬森
2026	The Unusual Prosecutor	Bao Hei-yan

== Awards ==
=== 2018 ===
- TVB Anniversary Award for Best Actor (Life on the Line)
- People's Choice Television Award for Best Actor (Life on the Line)
