= Bobby Au-yeung =

Hong Kong actor

Bobby Au-yeung Tsan-wah
- 歐陽震華
- Born: Au-Yeung Yiu-tsuen 歐陽耀泉 (Note: simplified Chinese: 欧阳耀泉, Jyutping: au1 joeng4 jiu6 cyun4, Pinyin: Ōuyáng Yàoquán); British Hong Kong
- Occupation: Actor
- Years active: 1982–present
- Spouses: Lau Wai-yu (m. 1991–1993) Fu Kit-han (m. 1996)
- Awards: TVB Anniversary Awards – Best Actor; 2000 Witness to a Prosecution; Most Comedic On-Screen Duo; 1997 Taming of the Princess; My Favourite Television Character; 2000 A Witness to a Prosecution; 2001 Armed Reaction III; 2003 A Witness to a Prosecution II; 2004 Shine on You Asian Television Awards – Best Comedy Performance by an Actor/Actress; 2017 House of Spirits

Chinese name
- Traditional Chinese: 歐陽震華
- Simplified Chinese: 欧阳震华
Transcriptions
Standard Mandarin
- Hanyu Pinyin: Ōuyáng Zhènhuá
Yue: Cantonese
- Jyutping: Au1 Joeng4 Zan3-waa4

Bobby Au-yeung Tsan-wah (Chinese: 歐陽震華, born Au-Yeung Yiu-tsuen) is a Hong Kong actor best known for his comedic roles in many TVB television dramas. He gained wide public attention in the 1990s for his portrayal of Ben Yu in the 1991 legal drama File of Justice, appearing in all five seasons. Au-Yeung is also known for his lead roles in several of TVB's most successful television series franchises, including Armed Reaction, Witness to a Prosecution, and Forensic Heroes. He is most recognised by TV audiences for his shaved head.

== Background ==
Au-yeung Tsan-wah's original name was Au-yeung Yiu-tsuen. The opportunity to change his name came from his classmate Ng Chi-keung in the art training class who changed his stage name to Ng Chun-yu. The fortune teller believed that the name "Yiu-tsuen" given to him by his ancestors showed the incompatibility of water and fire (Yiu represents fire, Tsuen represents water) and his fate lacked water. In addition, the names of popular TV artists at that time, such as Andy Lau Tak-wah, both had the character "Wah" in them. After calculating the number of strokes, the fortune teller suggested that he use "Tsan-wah", which means that only by using one's power to "shock" popular artists can one become popular. Au-yeung Tsan-wah changed his stage name to "The Turbulent Decade" in 1986 when he participated in the TV show of the same name.

He is the oldest son in his family and has younger brothers and sisters. He lived in different places in his early years. The place he lived for a long time was Wudi Street, Shek Tong Tsui. Later, he moved to a building near Hollywood Commercial Centre (Mong Kok) in Mong Kok, Kowloon (a neighbor of Ai Wai) and often went to MacPherson Stadium to play football after school. When he was growing up, he lived with his grandparents, three uncles and one aunt.

== Career ==
Au-Yeung graduated from TVB's Artiste Training Academy in 1982 and began appearing in many television dramas as background extras, to roles with minor speaking parts, and later to major supporting roles. He landed his first lead role in the legal drama File of Justice, which premiered in 1992. The show was a major success and spawned five seasons, turning Au-Yeung into a major breakout star. Au-Yeung won TVB Anniversary Award for Best Actor at the 2000 TVB Anniversary Awards for his portrayal as Sung Chee in Witness to a Prosecution. In 2007, he became the first Hong Kong actor to receive a nomination for Best Actor at the International Emmy Awards for his performance in Dicey Business. At the same time, he was nominated for the "Best Actor" at the 2007 Thousands of Stars Awards Ceremony and the "My Favorite Actor" at the 2008 Astro Wah Lai Toi TV Drama Awards for this drama, and was shortlisted for the final five and won the top five gold medal. However, he switched to a unit contract in 2010 and began to develop his career in mainland China, starring in a series of works such as Ghost Catcher - Legend of Beauty (Zhongkui), The Female Detective with a Knife, and La tabla de Flandes. In 2012, he collaborated with Esther Kwan again to film Always and Ever.

On February 12, 2013, Au-yeung was admitted to the Intensive Care Unit of Ruttonjee Hospital due to acute pneumonia caused by food entering his trachea, and once fell into a coma. He was discharged from the hospital on the 22nd of the same month.

In June 2015, feeling ignored by his company, Au-yeung had a disagreement with TVB over his contract, after that, the two sides reached a consensus on contract renewal.

== Filmography ==
=== Films ===
Year	Title	Role	Notes
1992	Hard Boiled	Lionheart	
1993	Love Quadrangle	Chiu Sei-mui	
1993	A Deadly Way	Wan Man	
1993	Perfect Exchange	Leapord	
1994	Lamb Killer	Paul	
1994	The Dying Run	Wan Man	A Deadly Way sequel
1994	Lying Hero	Wai	
1994	Fatal Encounter	Kwok Kin-wah	
1994	Trouble, I've Had it All My Days		
1995	The Eternal Evil of Asia	Nam	
1995	Daze Raper	Kwok Kam-hung	
1995	O.C.T.B. Case - The Floating Body	Inspector Au Tsan-kau	
1995	Spike Drink Gang		
1996	The Woman Behind	Kwai Sang	
1999	Snooper	Mang Lung	
2004	The Happiness of Family Reunion	Tak Ming	
2004	Guai Cai Bai Fen Bai	Sing Chor	
2010	A Revenue Story	Robert Lau	

=== Television dramas ===
Year	Title	Role	Notes
1982	Fool's Paradise		Extra
1982	The Legend of Master So		Extra
1982	Soldier of Fortune		Extra
1982	Love and Passion		Extra
1982	Hong Kong '82		Extra
1982	The Emissary		Extra
1983	Hong Kong '83	Tin	
1983	The Legend of the Condor Heroes	Waiter; Ah Tsuen/ Guard in the Luk Manor from episode 25 onwards	
1983	The Radio Tycoon		
1983	The Old Miao Myth	Wong Hing-kwan	
1983	Woman on the Beat		
1983	Angels and Devils		
1984	The Clones	Shum Kwok-leung	
1984	The Foundation	Li Jiancheng	
1984	The Smiling, Proud Wanderer	Yu Chong-hoi's son	
1984	The Friendly Halves		
1984	Sang Sau Que Wong		
1984	The Duke of Mount Deer		
1984	A Woman to Remember		
1984	The Other Side of the Horizon		
1984	The New Adventures of Chor Lau-heung	Sit Ban	
1985	The Fallen Family	Fong Sheung-man	
1985	Sword Stained with Royal Blood	Mui Kim-wo	
1985	The Rough Ride	Tsuen	
1985	The Battle Among the Clans		
1985	The Battlefield	Lung Che	
1985	Reincarnated Princess		
1986	Heir to the Throne Is...	Suen Kung-yee / Emperor Houshao of Han	
1986	The Return of Luk Siu-fung		
1986	The Turbulent Decade	Sung Sz-leung	
1986	Destined to Rebel	Chun Hung	
1987	The Grand Canal	Chak Yeung	
1988	Twilight of a Nation	Tsang Kwok-tsuen	
1989	Shanghai Conspiracy	Heung Nam	
1989	The Vixen's Tale	Pao Kam	
1989	Ho Ching		
1989	Flying Squads		
1989	Ode to Gallantry	Cheung Siu	
1989	Battle in the Royal Court		
1989	Chun Man Kung Chuen Ki		
1990	Three in a Family		
1990	Where I Belong	Sung Chi-him	
1991	Beyond Trust	Yuen Wai-kiu	
1991	The Breaking Point	Tung Hing	
1991	The Poor Rich Man	Franco	
1991	The Confidence Man		
1991–92	The Family Squad	Lau Ching-shan	
1992	File of Justice	Ben Yu Choi-chun	
1992	Wong Fei-hung Returns	Kam Dor-po	
1992	Money and Fame		
1993	File of Justice II	Ben Yu Choi-chun	
1993	The Art of Being Together		
1994	File of Justice III	Ben Yu Choi-chun	
1995	The Trail of Love	Tong Tin-chau	
1995	File of Justice IV	Ben Yu Choi-chun	
1996	Money Just Can't Buy	"Uncle Thirteen" Yeung Jai-choi	
1996	Nothing to Declare	Yip Tin-wah	
1997	Corner the Con Man	Kong Yat-kuk	
1997	Taming of the Princess	Prince Consort Kwok Oi	TVB Anniversary Award for Most Comedic On-Screen Duo with Esther Kwan
1997	File of Justice V	Ben Yu Choi-chun	
1997	A Recipe for the Heart	Kam Yat-shan / Tin Mei-kat / Tin Mei-chaang	
1998	Crimes of Passion	Kong Chor-fan	
1998	Armed Reaction	Inspector Chan Siu-sang	
1998	Web of Love	Kwok Ho-tung	
1999	Happy Ever After	Tai Tung-koon	Nominated — TVB Anniversary Award for Best Actor (Top 5)
1999	Anti-Crime Squad	Senior Inspector Kwok Oi	
1999	Witness to a Prosecution	Sung Chee	TVB Anniversary Award for Best Actor; TVB Anniversary Award for My Favourite Television Character
2000	Armed Reaction II	Senior Inspector Chan Siu-sang	
2000	The Legendary Four Aces	Chuk Chi-shan	
2001	Screen Play	Pak Chong-sai	
2001	Heroes in Black	Feng Pobu	
2001	Armed Reaction III	Chief Inspector Chan Siu-sang	TVB Anniversary Award for My Favourite Television Character; Nominated — TVB Award for Best Actor (Top 5)
2002	Take My Word for It	Chief Inspector Pang Kwok-tung	Nominated — TVB Anniversary Award for Best Actor (Top 5)
2002	Love on the Sky	Li Chengchu	
2003	Witness to a Prosecution II	Sung Chee	TVB Anniversary Award for My Favourite Television Character
2003	The Final Shot	Senior Inspector Kenny	Television film
2004	Armed Reaction IV	Chief Inspector Chan Siu-sang	
2004	Shine on You	Ka Jai-choi	
2005	Yueshang Jiangnan Zhi Di Renjie Xiyuan Lu	Di Renjie	
2005	Hidden Treasures	Tai Siu-leung	Warehoused; released overseas May 2004
2006	The Lucky Stars	Star of Longevity / Mei Shouchuan	
2006	A Pillow Case of Mystery	Sze Sai-lun	Nominated — TVB Anniversary Award for My Favourte Male Character (Top 20)
2006	Forensic Heroes	Timothy "Tim Sir" Ko Yin-pok	Nominated — TVB Anniversary Award for Best Actor (Top 20)
2006	Dicey Business	Chai Foon-cheung	Nominated — TVB Anniversary Award for Best Actor (Top 5); Nominated — International Emmy Award for Best Actor
2007	Fathers and Sons	"TC" Man Tin-chee (Lord Man) / Lui Ka-chuen (Lord Man)	Nominated — TVB Anniversary Award for My Favourite Male Character (Top 5)
2007	Marriage of Inconvenience	Kong Hoi-chuen / Old Tiger Dog	
2008	D.I.E.	Chai Foon-cheung	Cameo (Episode 25)
2008	Forensic Heroes II	Timothy "Tim Sir" Ko Yin-pok	
2008	Your Class or Mine	Pang Kam-chau	Nominated — TVB Anniversary Award for Best Actor (Top 10)
2009	Ghost Catcher - Legend of Beauty	Zhong Kui / Zhong Yunfei	Nominated - 16th Asian Television Awards for Best Actor in a Leading Role
2010	A Pillow Case of Mystery II	Sze Sai-lun	Nominated — TVB Anniversary Award for Best Actor (Top 15); Nominated — TVB Anniversary Award for My Favourite Male Character (Top 15)
2010	Tiansheng Wucai Zhi Dao Guang Xue Ying	Liu Yiqing	
2011	Men with No Shadows	Omar Kong Chi-chung	Nominated — TVB Anniversary Award for Best Actor (Top 15)
2011	Female Constables	Ouyang Dong	
2012	Ghost Catcher II	Zhong Kui / Zhong Yunfei	
2012	House of Harmony and Vengeance	Tai Ming-but / Kiu Bo-lung	Nominated - TVB Anniversary Award for My Favourite Male Character (Top 10)
2013	Always and Ever	Bao Zheng/Detective Wah Long-biu/Circle Yuen Kam-cheong	
2015	With or Without You	So Tung Po	
2016	House of Spirits	Po Foon	
2017	My Ages Apart	Sung Chung-kei / Bao Pau	
2019	Come Home Love: Lo And Behold	Au-Yeung Chun-wah / Chuk Chi-shan / Leung Shan-bak	Guest appearance in episodes 606–607
2021	Shadow of Justice	Au-Yeung Chung	Nominated - TVB Anniversary Award for Best Actor; Nominated - TVB Anniversary Award for Most Popular Male Character; Nominated - TVB Anniversary Award for Most Popular Onscreen Partnership with Joey Meng; Nominated — TVB Anniversary Award for Favourite TVB Actor in Malaysia

== Awards and titles ==
- TVB Anniversary Awards 1997 Most Comedic On-Screen Duo ~ Taming of the Princess (with Esther Kwan)
- TVB Anniversary Awards 2000 My Favourite Actor in a Leading Role ~ Witness to a Prosecution
- TVB Anniversary Awards 2000 My Top 10 Favorite Television Characters ~ Witness to a Prosecution
- TVB Anniversary Awards 2001 My Top 13 Favorite Television Characters ~ Armed Reaction III
- TVB Anniversary Awards 2003 My Top 12 Favorite Television Characters ~ A Witness to a Prosecution II
- TVB Anniversary Awards 2004 My Top 12 Favorite Television Characters ~ Shine on You
- 35th International Emmy Award 2007 Nominee for Best Performance by an Actor ~ Dicey Business
- 22nd Asia Television Awards 2017 Best Comedy Performance by An Actor/Actress ~ House of Spirits

Awards and achievements
TVB Anniversary Awards
Preceded by Louis Koo for Detective Investigation Files IV	Best Actor; 2000 for Witness to a Prosecution	Succeeded by Louis Koo for A Step Into the Past
