= Marco Ngai =

Hong Kong actor

- Born: 20 October 1967 (age 58); Hsinchu, Taiwan
- Spouse: Zhang Lihua (m. 2008; div. 2020)
- Partner: Joyce Tang (1998–2007)
- Children: Jessica Ngai (b. 2010)

Chinese name
- Traditional Chinese: 魏駿傑
- Simplified Chinese: 魏骏杰
Transcriptions
Standard Mandarin
- Hanyu Pinyin: Wèi Jùnjié

Marco Ngai Chun Kit (Traditional Chinese: 魏駿傑) is an actor in Hong Kong and has been in many TV series such as Flying Fox of Snowy Mountain 1997(or 98), To Catch the Uncatchable (2004) and one of the favourites, Armed Reaction series.

== Personal life ==
He was married to Zhang Lihua, who is from mainland China. In 2010, Lihua gave birth to their daughter, Jessica. They divorced in 2020. He and TVB actress Joyce Tang broke up in 2007, ending their 9-year relationship.

== Filmography ==
=== TV series ===
- The Chord to Victory (1993)
- The Legendary Ranger (1993)
- Mind Our Own Business (1993)
- The Condor Heroes Return (1993)
- Journey of Love (1994)
- Debts of a Life Time (1995)
- Wars of Bribery (1996)
- Food of Love (1996)
- Mystery Files (1997)
- Armed Reaction (1998)
- Justice Sung II (1999)
- The Flying Fox of the Snowy Mountain 1999 (1999)
- Detective Investigation Files II (1999)
- The Legendary Four Aces (2000)
- Armed Reaction II (2000)
- Armed Reaction III (2001)
- Love is Beautiful (2002)
- Armed Reaction IV (2003)
- In the Realm of Fancy (2003)
- Riches and Stitches (2003)
- Perish in the Name of Love (2003)
- Split Second (2003)
- To Catch the Uncatchable (2004)
- The Prince's Shadow (2005)
- When Rules Turn Loose (2005)
- The Ultimate Crime Fighter (2007)
- Little Miss Unreasonable (2010)
- The Men of Justice (2010)

=== Films ===
- Luxury Fantasy (2007)
- Once Upon a Chinese Classic (2010)
- Promise Time (2012)
- Show Hand (2014)
