= TVB Awards Winners Lists =

Hong Kong television awards

Each year TVB drama series and artists are honored at different award shows over Asia. The yearly list of winners of the main TVB Awards shows are hereby listed together by category. The TVB Awards shows are TVB Anniversary Awards, TVB Star Awards in Malaysia and StarHub TVB Awards in Singapore. In exception, winners in Asian Television Awards are included too. At this moment, the lists are only drawn up for Best / My Most Favourite Drama, Best / My Most Favourite Actor and Actress, Best / My Most Favourite Supporting Actor and Actress and My Most Favourite (Male / Female) TV Character(s).

== Included Awards Shows ==
Awards shows exclusively for TVB dramas and artists:
Depending on the year and the category, the winners are voted by a professional panel and/or by the audience.

- The TVB Anniversary Awards in Hong Kong is the most important TVB awards show. The first award ceremony took place on 19 November 1997. Since 2009, the show is annually held in December.
- The TVB Star Awards Malaysia was established in 2004. Over the years it has been renamed multiple times: Astro Wah Lai Toi Drama Awards (2004-2009), My Astro On Demand Favourite Awards (2010-2012) and TVB Star Awards Malaysia (2013- ). The annually ceremony takes place around end-November, prior to the TVB Anniversary Awards in Hong Kong.
- The StarHub TVB Awards in Singapore started in 2010. This ceremony takes place much earlier than the two other TVB Awards shows, which means that the annual nomination list includes dramas that aired the year before. The nomination for My Most Favourite Actor and My Most Favourite Actress were based on multiple performances in TVB dramas. Starting from 2014, artists are nominated for one specific role.

Asia awards shows

- Asian Television Awards (ATA) is an awards ceremony that recognizes excellence in programming, production and performance in the Asian TV industry. Each year, nominees for each category are carefully selected for their most outstanding performances. Over a more than 30 categories, the winners are determined by an expert panel of over 60 judges form across the region. The ceremony takes place in December. * Over the years, different Hong Kong dramas and artists have been nominated and some of them were awarded for their performances. TVB Artists that once won at ATA: Raymond Lam, Bowie Lam, Kevin Cheng and Moses Chan for Best Actor. Michelle Yim and Charmaine Sheh for Best Actress. Mak Cheung Ching for Best Supporting Actor. Susan Tse, Fala Chen and Nancy Wu for Best Supporting Actress. In 2012, The Confidant won Best Drama. Only the winners of Hong Kong are included in the lists.

== Winners Lists ==
=== Best / Favourite Drama ===
year	TVB Anniversary Awards	Malaysia TVB Awards	StarHub TVB Awards	Asian Television Awards
1997	Old Time Buddy	-	-	
1998	Healing Hands	-	-	
1999	-	-	-	
2000	-	-	-	
2001	-	-	-	
2002	-	-	-	
2003	-	-	-	
2004	War and Beauty	Square Pegs	-	
2005	Wars of In-laws	War and Beauty	-	
2006	La Femme Desperado	Wars of In-laws	-	
2007	Heart of Greed	Forensic Heroes	-	
2008	Moonlight Resonance	Heart of Greed	-	
2009	Rosy Business	Moonlight Resonance	-	
2010	Can't Buy Me Love	Can't Buy Me Love	Moonlight Resonance	
2011	Lives of Omission	Ghetto Justice	No Regrets	
2012	When Heaven Burns	The Hippocratic Crush	When Heaven Burns	
2013	Triumph in the Skies 2			The Confidant
2014	Line Walker		Black Heart White Soul	
2015	Lord of Shanghai	Captain of Destiny		
2016	A Fist Within Four Walls			
2017	My Ages Apart	Legal Mavericks	The Unholy Alliance	
2018	Life on the Line	Threesome		
2019	Big White Duel	—N/a	—N/a	—N/a
2020	Al Cappuccino		—N/a	—N/a
2021	Battle Of The Seven Sisters	Kids' Lives Matter	—N/a	—N/a
2022	Get On A Flat	—N/a	—N/a	—N/a

=== Best / Favourite Leading Actor ===
Year	TVB Anniversary Awards	Malaysia TVB Awards	StarHub TVB Awards	Asian Television Awards
1997	Gallen Lo (Old Time Buddy)	-	-	
1998	Gallen Lo (Secret of the Heart)	-	-	
1999	Louis Koo (Detective Investigation Files IV)	-	-	
2000	Bobby Au-yeung (Witness to a Prosecution)	-	-	
2001	Louis Koo (A Step into the Past)	-	-	
2002	Gallen Lo (Golden Faith)	-	-	
2003	Roger Kwok (Square Pegs)	-	-	
2004	Bowie Lam (War and Beauty)	Roger Kwok (Square Pegs)	-	
2005	Roger Kwok (Life Made Simple)	Raymond Lam (Twin of Brothers)	-	
2006	Kevin Cheng (Under the Canopy of Love)	Moses Chan (The Gentle Crackdown)	-	
2007	Moses Chan (Heart of Greed)	Roger Kwok (Life Made Simple)	-	
2008	Ha Yu (Moonlight Resonance)	Moses Chan (Heart of Greed)	-	Raymond Lam (The Master of Tai Chi)
2009	Wayne Lai (Rosy Business)	Raymond Lam (Moonlight Resonance)	-	
2010	Wayne Lai (No Regrets)	Moses Chan (Can't Buy Me Love)	Raymond Lam (Moonlight Resonance)	Bowie Lam (Sisters of Pearl)
2011	Kevin Cheng (Ghetto Justice)	Kevin Cheng (Ghetto Justice)	Moses Chan (Can't Buy Me Love)	Kevin Cheng (Ghetto Justice)
2012	Wayne Lai (The Confidant)	Kenneth Ma (The Hippocratic Crush)	Kevin Cheng (Ghetto Justice)	Moses Chan (When Heaven Burns)
2013	Dayo Wong (Bounty Lady)	Julian Cheung (Triumph in the Skies 2)	Bosco Wong (Witness Insecurity)	
2014	Roger Kwok (Black Heart White Soul)	Roger Kwok (Black Heart White Soul)	Ruco Chan (Ruse of Engagement)	
2015	Anthony Wong (Lord of Shanghai)	Ruco Chan (Captain of Destiny)		
2016	Ruco Chan (A Fist Within Four Walls)			
2017	Vincent Wong (Legal Mavericks)	Michael Miu (Line Walker: The Prelude)	Vincent Wong (Legal Mavericks)	
2018	Joe Ma (Life on the Line)	Benjamin Yuen (Stealing Seconds)		
2019	Kenneth Ma (Big White Duel)	—N/a	—N/a	—N/a

Multiple wins Best / Favourite Actor:

TVB Anniversary Awards	Malaysia TVB Awards	Singapore TVB Awards
Gallen Lo (3); Wayne Lai (3); Roger Kwok (3); Louis Koo (2); Kevin Cheng (2); Vincent Wong (2)	Moses Chan (3); Roger Kwok (3); Raymond Lam (2); Hammond Lek (2) Ruco Chan (2)	Ruco Chan (3)

=== Best / Favourite Leading Actress ===
Year	TVB Anniversary Awards	Malaysia TVB Awards	StarHub TVB Awards	Asian Television Awards
1997	Esther Kwan (Lady Flower Fist)	-	-	
1998	Ada Choi (Secret of the Heart)	-	-	
1999	Jessica Hsuan (Detective Investigation Files IV)	-	-	
2000	Carol Cheng (War of the Genders)	-	-	
2001	Liza Wang (The Awakening Story)	-	-	
2002	Flora Chan (Family Man)	-	-	
2003	Maggie Cheung Ho Yee (The King of Yesterday and Tomorrow)	-	-	
2004	Gigi Lai (War and Beauty)	Flora Chan (Triumph in the Skies)	-	
2005	Liza Wang (Wars of In-laws)	Charmaine Sheh (War and Beauty)	-	
2006	Charmaine Sheh (Maidens' Vow)	Myolie Wu (Wars of In-laws)	-	
2007	Louise Lee (Heart of Greed)	Gigi Lai (The Dance of Passion)	-	
2008	Michelle Yim (Moonlight Resonance)	Louise Lee (Heart of Greed)	-	
2009	Sheren Tang (Rosy Business)	Charmaine Sheh (Forensic Heroes II)	-	Michelle Yim (Moonlight Resonance)
2010	Sheren Tang (No Regrets)	Charmaine Sheh (Can't Buy Me Love)	-	Charmaine Sheh (Forensic Heroes II )
2011	Myolie Wu (Curse of the Royal Harem)		Charmaine Sheh (Can't Buy Me Love)	Charmaine Sheh (Can't Buy Me Love)
2012	Tavia Yeung (Silver Spoon, Sterling Shackles)		Myolie Wu (Ghetto Justice)	
2013	Kristal Tin (Brother's Keeper)	Linda Chung (Brother's Keeper)	Tavia Yeung (Silver Spoon, Sterling Shackles)	
2014	Charmaine Sheh (Line Walker)			
2015	Nancy Wu (Ghost of Relativity)	Kristal Tin and Nancy Wu (Ghost of Relativity)	Liza Wang (Limelight Years)	
2016	Nancy Wu (A Fist Within Four Walls)			
2017	Natalie Tong (My Unfair Lady)	Jessica Hsuan (My Unfair Lady)	Ali Lee (Legal Mavericks)	
2018	Ali Lee (Who Wants A Baby?)	Mandy Wong (Threesome)		
2019	Kara Wai (The Defected)	—N/a	—N/a	—N/a

Multiple wins Best / Favourite Actress:

TVB Anniversary Awards	Malaysia TVB Awards	Singapore TVB Awards
Liza Wang (2); Sheren Tang (2); Charmaine Sheh (2); Nancy Wu (2)	Charmaine Sheh (4); Myolie Wu (2); Nancy Wu (2)	Charmaine Sheh (3)

=== Best / Favourite Supporting Actor ===
Year	TVB Anniversary Awards	Malaysia TVB Awards	StarHub TVB Awards	Asian Television Awards
2005	Ha Yu (My Family)	-	-	
2006	Kenny Wong (The Dance of Passion)	-	-	
2007	Louis Yuen (Heart of Greed)	-	-	
2008	Wayne Lai (The Gentle Crackdown 2)	-	-	
2009	Michael Tse (E.U.)	-	-	
2010	Evergreen Mak (No Regrets)	Pierre Ngo (No Regrets)	-	Evergreen Mak (No Regrets)
2011	Ben Wong (Lives of Omission)	Raymond Wong Ho-yin (Twilight Investigation)	-	
2012	Koo Ming Wah (Divas in Distress)	Him Law (The Hippocratic Crush)	-	
2013	Benz Hui (Bounty Lady)	Him Law (Triumph in the Skies 2)	-	
2014	Ram Chiang (Come On, Cousin)	Benz Hui (Line Walker)	Him Law (The Hippocratic Crush 2)	
2015	Wai Ka Hung (Lord of Shanghai)	Benjamin Yuen (The Fixer)	Vincent Wong (Tomorrow Is Another Day)	
2016	Raymond Cho (Short End of the Stick)	Mat Yeung (My Dangerous Mafia Retirement Plan)	Raymond Cho (Short End of the Stick)	
2017	Joel Chan (The Unholy Alliance)	Joel Chan (The Unholy Alliance)	Owen Cheung (Legal Mavericks)	
2018	Oscar Leung (OMG, Your Honour)	—N/a	—N/a	
2019	Kalok Chow (Come Home Love: Lo and Behold)	—N/a	—N/a	

Multiple wins Best / Supporting Actor:

TVB Anniversary Awards	Malaysia TVB Awards	Singapore TVB Awards
-	Him Law (2)	-

=== Best / Favourite Supporting Actress ===
Year	TVB Anniversary Awards	Malaysia TVB Awards	StarHub TVB Awards	Asian Television Awards
2005	Angela Tong (Life Made Simple)	-	-	
2006	Shirley Yeung (Always Ready)	-	-	
2007	Fala Chen (Steps)	-	-	
2008	Tavia Yeung (Moonlight Resonance)	-	-	
2009	Susan Tse (Rosy Business)	-	-	
2010	Fala Chen (No Regrets)	Fala Chen (No Regrets)	-	Susan Tse (Beyond the Realm of Conscience)
2011	Sharon Chan (Ghetto Justice)	Sharon Chan (Ghetto Justice)	-	Fala Chen (No Regrets)
2012	Nancy Wu (Gloves Come Off)	Nancy Wu (Gloves Come Off)	-	Nancy Wu (Gloves Come Off)
2013	Elena Kong (Triumph in the Skies 2)	Nancy Wu (Triumph in the Skies 2)	-	
2014	Josie Ho (Tomorrow is Another Day)	Sharon Chan (Line Walker)	Sharon Chan (The Ultimate Addiction)	
2015	Elaine Yiu (Captain of Destiny)	Elaine Yiu (Raising The Bar)	Rosina Lam (Young Charioteers)	
2016	Katy Kung (Two Steps From Heavan)	Joyce Tang (House of Spirits)	Rosina Lam (Short End of the Stick)	
2017	Rebecca Zhu (A General, a Scholar and a Eunuch)	Elaine Yiu (The Unholy Alliance)	Jacqueline Wong (Provocateur)	
2018	Mandy Lam (Come Home Love: Lo and Behold)	—N/a	—N/a	
2019	Candice Chiu ( Barrack O'Karma)	—N/a	—N/a	

Multiple wins Best / Favourite Supporting Actress:

TVB Anniversary Awards	Malaysia TVB Awards	Singapore TVB Awards
Fala Chen (2)	Nancy Wu (2); Sharon Chan (2); Elaine Yiu (2)	Rosina Lam (2)

=== My Favourite TV Character ===
Year	TVB Anniversary Awards	Malaysia TVB Awards	StarHub TVB Awards
1999	All-Time Most Memorable Male Leading Roles: Chow Yun Fat (The Bund) 1980; Damian Lau (Luk Siu Fung) 1986; Andy Lau (The Return of the Condor Heroes) 1983; Dicky Cheung (Journey to the West) 1996; Lawrence Ng (Healing Hands) 1998; All-Time Most Memorable Female Leading Roles: Josephine Siao (It's Just That Easy) 1977; Liza Wang (A House is Not a Home) 1977; Angie Chiu (The Bund) 1980; Nancy Sit (A Kindred Spirit) 1995; Maggie Cheung Ho Yee (Old Time Buddy) 1997	-	-
2000	My Top Favourite TV Characters: Bobby Au-yeung (Witness to a Prosecution); Carol Cheng (War of the Genders); Dayo Wong (War of the Genders); Gallen Lo (At the Threshold of an Era 2); Louis Koo (At the Threshold of an Era 2); Liza Wang (At the Threshold of an Era 2); Julian Cheung (Return of the Cuckoo); Charmaine Sheh (Return of the Cuckoo); Nancy Sit (Return of the Cuckoo); Nick Cheung (The Legendary Four Aces); Lam Ka Tung (Plain Love 2); Jessica Hsuan (A matter of Customs)	-	-
2001	My Top Favourite TV Characters: Louis Koo (A Step Into the Past); Jessica Hsuan (A Step Into the Past); Liza Wang (The Awakening Story); Maggie Cheung Ho Yee (The Awakening Story); Bobby Au-yeung (Armed Reaction 3); Ada Choi (Armed Reaction 3); Kingdom Yuen (Gods of Honour); Nancy Sit (Virtues of Harmony); Dicky Cheung (The Duke of Mount Deer); Steven Ma (On the Track or Off); Gallen Lo (Seven Sisters); Lawrence Ng (Healing Hands 2); Charmaine Sheh (Country Spirits)	-	-
2002	My Top Favourite TV Characters: Gallen Lo (Golden Faith); Jessica Hsuan (Golden Faith); Flora Chan (Family Man); Paul Chun (Family Man); Ada Choi (Where the Legend Begins); Steven Ma (Where the Legend Begins); Hacken Lee (Legal Entanglement); Kenix Kwok (Legal Entanglement); Wong He (Burning Flame 2); Alex Fong (Burning Flame 2); Jenny Shing (Burning Flame 2); Lydia Shum (Slim Chances)	-	-
2003	My Top Favourite TV Characters: Roger Kwok (Square Pegs); Jessica Hsuan (Square Pegs); Maggie Cheung Ho Yee (The King of Yesterday and Tomorrow); Kwong Wah (The King of Yesterday and Tomorrow); Francis Ng (Triumph in the Skies); Flora Chan (Triumph in the Skies); Steven Ma (Perish in the Name of Love); Charmaine Sheh (Perish in the Name of Love); Julian Cheung (Take My Word for it); Bobby Au-yeung (A Witness to a Prosecution 2); Kenix Kwok (Seed of Hope); Bowie Lam (Vigilante Force)	-	-
2004	My Top Favourite TV Characters: Jessica Hsuan (Lady Fan); Roger Kwok (To Get Unstuck in Time); Raymond Lam (Twin of Brothers); Ada Choi (To Catch the Uncatchable); Dayo Wong (To Catch the Uncatchable); Kenix Kwok (Shine of You); Bobby Au-yeung (Shine of You); Bowie Lam (War and Beauty); Moses Chan (War and Beauty); Gigi Lai (War and Beauty); Sheren Tang (War and Beauty); Charmaine Sheh (War and Beauty)	My Top Favourite TV Characters: Gallen Lo (Golden Faith); Bowie Lam (Vigilante Force); Joyce Tang (Armed Reaction IV); Bobby Au-yeung (Armed Reaction IV); Roger Kwok (Square Pegs); Jessica Hsuan (Square Pegs); Flora Chan (Triumph in the Skies); Francis Ng (Triumph in the Skies); Charmaine Sheh (Perish in the Name of Love)	-
2005	-	My Top Favourite TV Characters: Roger Kwok (To Get Unstuck in Time); Myolie Wu (Dream of Colours); Kevin Cheng (Hard Fate); Ada Choi (To Catch the Uncatchble); Dayo Wong (To Catch the Uncatchble); Julian Cheung (Point of No Return); Raymond Lam (Twin of Brothers); Ron Ng (Twin of Brothers); Gigi Lai (War and Beauty); Maggie Cheung Ho Yee (War and Beauty); Charmaine Sheh (War and Beauty); Sheren Tang (War and Beauty)	-
2006	My Favourite Male Character: Steven Ma (Safe Guards); Sheung Chi My Favourite Female Character: Charmaine Sheh (Maidens' Vow); Ngai Yu Fung; Wang Chi Kwun; Bak Wai Jan; Dai Sze Ka	My Top Favourite TV Characters: Raymond Lam (Food for Life); Charmaine Sheh (Food for Life); Kevin Cheng (Food for Life); Julian Cheung (Shades of Truth); Moses Chan (Love Bond); Bernice Liu (Love Bond); Nick Cheung (The Last Breakthrough); Sonija Kwok (The Last Breakthrough); Roger Kwok (Scavenger's Paradise); Ron Ng (Revolving Doors of Vengeance); Myolie Wu (Wars of In-laws); Bosco Wong (Wars of In-laws)	-
2007	My Favourite Male Character: Moses Chan (Heart of Greed); Tong Chi On My Favourite Female Character: Susanna Kwan (Heart of Greed); Frances, Wong Sau Kam	My Top Favourite TV Characters: Roger Kwok (Life Made Simple); Sonija Kwok (Land of Wealth); Moses Chan (Land of Wealth); Steven Ma (Safe Guards); Myolie Wu (War and Destiny); Charmaine Sheh (The Dance of Passion); Gigi Lai (The Dance of Passion); Bosco Wong (Under the Canopy of Love); Kevin Cheng (Under the Canopy of Love); Michael Tse (La Femme Desperado); Sheren Tang (La Femme Desperado); Raymond Lam (La Femme Desperado)	-
2008	My Favourite Male Character: Raymond Lam (Moonlight Resonance); Gan Wing Ho My Favourite Female Character: Louise Lee (Moonlight Resonance); Chung Siu Hor	My Top Favourite TV Characters: Myolie Wu (To Grow with Love); Bobby Au-yeung (Dicey Business); Jessica Hsuan (Dicey Business); Tavia Yeung (Dicey Business); Joe Ma (Maidens' Vow); Bosco Wong (The Price of Greed); Moses Chan (Heart of Greed); Louise Lee (Heart of Greed); Linda Chung (Heart of Greed); Ron Ng (On the First Beat); Charmaine Sheh (The Drive of Life); Raymond Lam (The Drive of Life)	-
2009	My Favourite Male Character: Wayne Lai (Rosy Business); Chai Kau My Favourite Female Character: Tavia Yeung (Beyond the Realm of Conscience); Yiu Kam Ling	My Top Favourite TV Characters: Roger Kwok (D.I.E.); Sonija Kwok (D.I.E.); Steven Ma (A Journey Called Life); Linda Chung (A Journey Called Life); Ha Yu (Moonlight Resonance); Moses Chan (Moonlight Resonance); Raymond Lam (Moonlight Resonance); Louise Lee (Moonlight Resonance); Wayne Lai (The Gentle Crackdown 2); Kevin Cheng (Last One Standing); Myolie Wu (Wars of In-laws 2); Charmaine Sheh (Forensic Heroes 2)	-
2010	My Favourite Male Character: Raymond Lam (The Mysteries of Love); Kinsley, King Pok My Favourite Female Character: Charmaine Sheh (Can't Buy Me Love); Princess Chiu Yeung	My Top Favourite TV Characters: Kevin Cheng (A Fistful of Stances); Kenneth Ma (A Fistful of Stances); Tavia Yeung (The Mysteries of Love); Raymond Lam (The Mysteries of Love); Linda Chung (Ghost Writer); Steven Ma (Ghost Writer); Charmaine Sheh (Can't Buy Me Love); Moses Chan (Can't Buy Me Love); Sheren Tang (No Regrets); Wayne Lai (No Regrets)	My Top Favourite Male Characters: Raymond Lam (Moonlight Resonance); Moses Chan (Moonlight Resonance); Wayne Lai (Rosy Business); Roger Kwok (D.I.E.); Steven Ma (The Gentle Crackdown 2) My Top Favourite Female Characters: Louise Lee (Moonlight Resonance); Tavia Yeung (Moonlight Resonance); Susanna Kwan (Moonlight Resonnce); Fala Chen (Moonlight Resonance); Sonija Kwok (D.I.E.); Charmaine Sheh (Forensic Heroes 2)
2011	My Favourite Male Character: Kevin Cheng (Ghetto Justice); Law Lik Ah My Favourite Female Character: Myolie Wu (Ghetto Justice); Kris, Wong Si Fu	My Top Favourite TV Characters: Julian Cheung (The Rippling Blossom); Moses Chan (Yes, Sir. Sorry, Sir!); Linda Chung (Yes, Sir. Sorry, Sir!); Kevin Cheng (Ghetto Justice); Ruco Chan (The Other Truth); Tavia Yeung (The Other Truth); Kenneth Ma (The Life and Times of a Sentinel); Michael Tse (Lives of Omission); Fala Chen (Lives of Omission); Bosco Wong (Lives of Omissoin); Raymond Lam (Men with No Shadow); Wayne Lai (Forensic Heroes 3); Kate Tsui (Forensic Heroes 3); Ron Ng (Forensic Heroes 3); Myolie Wu (Curse of the Royal Harem)	My Top Favourite Male Characters: Wayne Lai (No Regrets); Raymond Lam (The Mysteries of Love); Kevin Cheng (A Fistful of Stances); Bosco Wong (Growing Through Life); Julian Cheung (The Rippling Blossom) My Top Favourite Female Characters: Tavia Yeung (The Mysteries of Love); Sheren Tang (No Regrets); Fala Chen (No Regrets); Myolie Wu (The Rippling Blossom); Kate Tsui (When Lanes Merge)
2012	My Favourite Male Character: Kenneth Ma (The Hippocratic Crush); Cheung Yat Kin My Favourite Female Character: Kate Tsui (Highs and Lows); Pat, Chan Ka Pik	My Top Favourite TV Characters: Michael Tse (Sergeant Tabloid); Ron Ng (L'Escargot); Ruco Chan (No Good Either Way); Kenneth Ma (The Hippocratic Crush); Tavia Yeung (The Hippocratic Crush); Him Law (The Hippocratic Crush); Roger Kwok (Queens of Diamonds and Hearts); Kevin Cheng (Gloves Come Off); Moses Chan (Master of Play); Kate Tsui (Highs and Lows); Raymond Lam (Highs and Lows); Bosco Wong (Witness Insecurity); Linda Chung (Witness Insecurity); Myolie Wu (Ghetto Justice 2); Wayne Lai (The Confidant)	My Top Favourite Male Characters: Kenneth Ma (The Hippocratic Crush); Moses Chan (When Heaven Burns); Bosco Wong (Lives of Omission); Kevin Cheng (Ghetto Justice); Wayne Lai (Forensic Heroes 3); Sunny Chan (Curse of the Royal Harem) My Top Favourite Female Characters: Myolie Wu (Ghetto Justice); Linda Chung (L'Escargot); Tavia Yeung (The Hippocratic Crush); Kate Tsui (Lives of Omission); Fala Chen (Queens of Diamonds and Hearts); Charmaine Sheh (When Heaven Burns)
2013	My Favourite Male Character: Julian Cheung (Triumph in the Skies 2); Jayden, Ha Yeung Koo My Favourite Female Character: Kristal Tin (Brother's Keeper); You Man Ying	My Top Favourite TV Characters: Wong Cho Lam (Inbound Troubles); Bosco Wong (A Change of Heart); Francis Ng (Triumph in the Skies 2); Julian Cheung (Triumph in the Skies 2); Fala Chen (Triumph in the Skies 2); Myolie Wu (Triumph in the Skies 2); Ron Ng (Triumph in the Skies 2); Nancy Wu (Triumph in the Skies 2); Ruco Chan (Brother's Keeper); Edwin Siu (Brother's Keeper); Linda Chung (Brother's Keeper); Kristal Tin (Brother's Keeper); Kenneth Ma (The Hippocratic Crush 2); Tavia Yeung (The Hippocratic Crush 2); Mandy Wong (The Hippocratic Crush 2)	My Top Favourite Male Characters: Raymond Lam (Highs and Lows); Moses Chan (Beauty at War); Bosco Wong (Witness Insecurity); Kenneth Ma (Three Kingdoms RPG); Julian Cheung (Triumph in the Skies 2); Ruco Chan (Slow Boat Home) My Top Favourite Female Characters: Myolie Wu (Triumph in the Skies 2); Linda Chung (Witness Insecurity); Tavia Yeung (Silver Spoon, Sterling Shackles); Kate Tsui (Highs and Lows); Michelle Yim (The Confidant); Niki Chow (A Change of Heart)
2014	My Favourite Male Character: Benz Hui (Line Walker); Chum Foon Hei My Favourite Female Character: Charmaine Sheh (Line Walker); Ting Siu Ka	My Top Favourite TV Characters: Bosco Wong (The Ultimate Addiction); Nancy Wu (The Ultimate Addiction); Kate Tsui (Tomorrow is Another Day); Roger Kwok (Black Heart White Soul); Sharon Chan (Line Walker); Charmaine Sheh (Line Walker); Benz Hui (Line Walker); Michael Miu (Line Walker); Raymond Lam (Line Walker); Him Law (Tiger Cubs 2); Tavia Yeung (Storm in a Cocoon); Ruco Chan (Outbound Love); Linda Chung (All That is Bitter is Sweet); Kenneth Ma (Ghost Dragon of Cold Mountain); Selena Li (Ghost Dragon of Cold Mountain)	My Top Favourite Male Characters: Ruco Chan (Brother's Keeper); Edwin Siu (Brother's Keeper); Wong Cho Lam (Gilded Chopsticks); Bosco Wong (The Ultimate Addiction); Kenneth Ma (Ghost Dragon of Cold Mountain); Roger Kwok (Black Heart White Soul) My Top Favourite Female Characters: Kate Tsui (Bounty Lady); Tavia Yeung (Storm in a Cocoon); Nancy Wu (The Ultimate Addiction); Kristal Tin (Black Heart White Soul); Linda Chung (All That is Bitter is Sweet); Charmaine Sheh (Line Walker)
2015	My Favourite Male Character: Ruco Chan (Captain of Destiny); Man Ho My Favourite Female Character: Kristal Tin (Ghost of Relativity); May Suen Suk-Mui	My Top Favourite TV Characters: Selena Li (Brick Slaves); Wayne Lai (Lord of Shanghai); Louis Cheung (Momentary Lapse of Reason); Tavia Yeung (Momentary Lapse of Reason); Rosina Lam (Momentary Lapse of Reason); Priscilla Wong (Madam Cutie On Duty); Ben Wong (Raising the Bar); Elaine Yiu (Raising the Bar); Mandy Wong (The Fixer); Kristal Tin (Ghost of Relativity); Nancy Wu (Ghost of Relativity); Him Law (Young Charioteers); Ruco Chan (Captain of Destiny); Tony Hung (Captain of Destiny); Linda Chung (Limelight Years)	My Top Favourite Male Characters: Kenneth Ma (Noblesse Oblige); Wayne Lai (Overachievers); Moses Chan (Every Step You Take); Lawrence Ng (Tomorrow Is Another Day); Edwin Siu (Madam Cutie On Duty); Louis Cheung (Momentary Lapse of Reasonl) My Top Favourite Female Characters: Eliza Lam (Under the Veil); Tavia Yeung (Eye In The Sky); Nancy Wu (Ghost of Relativity); Linda Chung (Tiger Cubs II); Selena Li (Brick Slaves); Priscilla Wong (Madam Cutie of Duty); Kristal Tin (Ghost of Relativity)
2016	My Favourite Male Character: Benjamin Yuen (A Fist Within Four Walls); Duen Ying-fung My Favourite Female Character: Grace Wong (A Fist Within Four Walls); Fa Man	Natalie Tong as Yiu Yiu in Speed of Life; Wayne Lai as Lee Suk-gung in Short End of the Stick; Grace Chan as Yoyo Lam Mung-yiu in Blue Veins; Eliza Sam as Joyce Ho Fuen-sam in My Dangerous Mafia Retirement Plan; Sisley Choi as Eunice Yan Yin in Presumed Accidents; Bobby Au-yeung as Po Foon in House of Spirits; Joyce Tang as Po Yan in House of Spirits; Koni Lui as Fiona Yu Fa in House of Spirits; Ruco Chan as Chor Au-kuen in A Fist Within Four Walls; Nancy Wu as Tiu Lan in A Fist Within Four Walls; Benjamin Yuen as Duen Ying-fung in A Fist Within Four Walls; Grace Wong as Fa Man in A Fist Within Four Walls; Philip Ng as Lung Shing-fu in A Fist Within Four Walls; Ali Lee as Hazel Cheuk Yi-chung in Law dis-Order; Mandy Wong as Martha Fong Ning in Law dis-Order; Kristal Tin as Miu Miu-miu in My Lover from the Planet Meow	My Top Favourite Male Characters: Edwin Siu (Brothers Keeper 2) Benjamin Yuen (A Fist Within Four Walls) Moses Chan (Fashion War) Kenneth Ma (Lord of Shanghai) Bobby Au Yeung (House of Spirits) Vincent Wong (Over Run Over) My Top Favourite Female Characters: Kristal Tin (Brothers Keeper 2) Mandy Wong (Law Disorder) Alice Chan (Lord of Shanghai) Grace Wong (A Fist Within Four Walls) Selena Li (Presumed Accidents) Tracy Chu (Over Run Over)

Multiple wins My Favourite TV Character:

TVB Anniversary Awards starting from 2006-	Malaysia TVB Awards	Singapore TVB Awards
M: Raymond Lam (2); F: Charmaine Sheh (3); Kristal Tin (2)	M: Raymond Lam (9); Moses Chan (7); Roger Kwok (7); Kevin Cheng (7); Bosco Wong (7); Ruco Chan (6); Wayne Lai (2); F: Charmaine Sheh (8); Myolie Wu (8); Linda Chung (7); Tavia Yeung (6); Nancy Wu (4); Mandy Wong (2)	M: Kenneth Ma (5); Moses Chan (4); Wayne Lai (4); Bosco Wong (4); Ruco Chan (2) F: Tavia Yeung (6); Linda Chung (4); Kate Tsui (4) Myolie Wu (3) Fala Chen (3) Kristal Tin (3) Selena Li (2) Nancy Wu (2)

== Record Holders ==
=== TVB Anniversary Awards (HK) ===
Full list of record holders at TVB Anniversary Awards

Category	Winner
Most wins all time (different categories)	Charmaine Sheh: 10 wins
Most wins by one drama	War and Beauty: 9 wins
Best Actor: most wins	Gallen Lo: 3 times (1997,1998, 2002); Wayne Lai: 3 times (2009, 2010, 2012); Roger Kwok; 3 times (2003, 2005, 2014)
Best Actor: most nominations in Top 5	Moses Chan: 9 times (1 win in 2007)
Best Actor: most nominations in Top 5 without a win	Raymond Lam: 7 times
Double TV King(*)	Moses Chan (2007); Wayne Lai (2009); Kevin Cheng (2011)
Best Actor: most consecutive wins	Gallen Lo: 2 consecutive wins (1997, 1998); Wayne Lai: 2 consecutive wins (2009, 2010)
Best Actress: most wins	Liza Wang: 2 times (2001, 2005); Sheren Tang: 2 times (2009, 2010); Charmaine Sheh: 2 times (2006, 2014); Nancy Wu: 2 times (2015, 2016)
Best Actress: most nominations in Top 5	Charmaine Sheh (2 wins) and Jessica Hsuan (1 win): 10 times
Double TV Queen(*)	Charmaine Sheh: 2 times (2006, 2014); Myolie Wu (2011); Kristal Tin (2013)
Best Actress: most consecutive wins	Sheren Tang: 2 consecutive wins (2009, 2010); Nancy Wu: 2 consecutive wins (2015, 2016)
My Favourite Male Character: most wins	Raymond Lam: 2 times (2008, 2010)
My Favourite Female Character: most wins	Charmaine Sheh: 3 times (2006, 2010, 2014)

(*) winning both Best Actor/Actress and My Favourite Male/Female Character at the same time

=== Malaysia TVB Star Awards (MY) ===
Category	Winner
Favourite Actor in Leading Role: most wins	Moses Chan: 3 times (2006, 2008, 2010); Roger Kwok: 3 times (2004, 2007, 2014)
Favourite Actress in Leading Role: most wins	Charmaine Sheh: 4 times (2005, 2009, 2010, 2014)
Favourite Actor in Leading Role: most consecutive wins	Ruco Chan: 2 consecutive wins (2015, 2016)
Favourite Actress in Leading Role: most consecutive wins	Charmaine Sheh: 2 consecutive wins (2009, 2010); Nancy Wu: 2 consecutive wins (2015, 2016)
Favourite Actor in Leading Role: youngest winner	Raymond Lam (26 yo, 2005)
Favourite Actor in Leading Role: oldest winner	Roger Kwok (43 yo, 2007)
Favourite Actress in Leading role: youngest winner	Myolie Wu (27 yo, 2006)
Favourite Actress in Leading role: oldest winner	Louise Lee (58 yo, 2008)
First Duo Winner Favourite Actress in Leading role	Kristal Tin and Nancy Wu for Ghost of Relativity (2015)

=== Singapore StarHub TVB Awards (SG) ===
Category	Winner
Favourite Actor in Leading Role: most wins	Ruco Chan: 3 times (2014, 2015, 2016)
Favourite Actress in Leading Role: most wins	Charmaine Sheh: 3 times (2010, 2011, 2014)
Favourite Actor in Leading Role: most consecutive wins	Ruco Chan: 3 consecutive wins (2014, 2015, 2016)
Favourite Actress in Leading Role: most consecutive wins	Charmaine Sheh: 2 consecutive wins (2010, 2011)
Favourite Actor in Leading Role: youngest winner	Raymond Lam (31 yo, 2010)
Favourite Actor in Leading Role: oldest winner	Kevin Cheng (42 yo, 2012)
Favourite Actress in Leading role: youngest winner	Myolie Wu (33 yo, 2012)
Favourite Actress in Leading role: oldest winner	Charmaine Sheh (39 yo, 2014)

=== Asian Television Awards (ATA) ===
YEAR	Category	Winner	TV series
2007	Best Comedy Performance by an Actor/Actress	Myolie Wu	-
2008	Best Actor in a Leading Role	Raymond Lam	The Master of Tai Chi
2009	Best Actress in a Leading Role	Michelle Yim	Moonlight Resonance
2010	Best Actor in a Leading Role	Bowie Lam	-
2010	Best Actress in a Supporting Role	Susan Tse	-
2011	Best Actor in a Leading Role	Kevin Cheng	Ghetto Justice
2011	Best Actress in a Leading Role	Charmaine Sheh	Can't Buy Me Love
2011	Best Actor in a Supporting Role	Evergreen Mak	No Regrets
2011	Best Actress in a Supporting Role	Fala Chen	No Regrets
2012	Best Actor in a Leading Role	Moses Chan	When Heaven Burns
2012	Best Actress in a Supporting Role	Nancy Wu	Gloves Come Off
2015	Best Comedy Performance by an Actor/Actress	Ivana Wong	-

=== Most wins for Drama/Acting in Lead & Supporting Roles ===
Grand Slam refers to winning at all 3 Awards shows exclusively for TVB dramas and artists:

- TVB Anniversary Awards
- TVB Star Awards Malaysia
- StarHub TVB Awards

Best Drama

- War and Beauty won 9 awards in 2004 - making it the most winning TVB drama.
- Since 2006, 4 TVB dramas - Heart of Greed (2007), Moonlight Resonance (2008), Rosy Business (2009) and A Fist Within Four Walls (2016) hold the record for the most wins by a drama series with 6 awards each.
- Moonlight Resonance, Triumph in the Skies 2 and A Fist Within Four Walls are the 3 dramas to win the grand slam for Best/Favorite Drama. All 3 dramas have won the TVB Anniversary Awards, TVB Star Awards Malaysia and StarHub TVB Awards.

Best Actor / My Favourite Leading Actor

- Kevin Cheng and Ruco Chan have both won the Best Actor grand slam. Cheng won for Ghetto Justice in 2011 (he also won My Favorite Male Character at the Asian Television Awards, winning in total 4 awards for one role) and Chan won for A Fist Within Four Walls in 2016.
- Roger Kwok holds the record for winning Best Actor at both TVB Anniversary Awards and TVB Star Awards Malaysia for the same role 3 times - for Square Pegs in 2003, Life Made Simple in 2005 and Black Heart White Soul in 2014.
- Gallen Lo, Roger Kwok and Wayne Lai hold the record for the most Best Actor wins at TVB Anniversary Awards. They have each won the Best Actor award 3 times.
- Roger Kwok, Moses Chan and Ruco Chan hold the record for most Best Actor wins in all four award shows - they have each won 6 awards.

Best Actress / My Favourite Leading Actress

- Tavia Yeung, Charmaine Sheh and Nancy Wu have all won the Best Actress grand slam. Yeung won for Silver Spoon, Sterling Shackles in 2012, Sheh won for Line Walker in 2014 and Wu won for A Fist Within Four Walls in 2016.
- Charmaine Sheh holds the record for winning Best Actress for the same role at 3 different award shows twice - for Line Walker and Can't Buy Me Love.
- Liza Wang, Sheren Tang, Charmaine Sheh and Nancy Wu hold the record for the most Best Actress wins at TVB Anniversary Awards. They have each won the Best Actress award 2 times.
- Charmaine Sheh holds the record for the most Best Actress wins in all four award shows - she has won 10 awards in total.

Best Supporting Actor

- Him Law holds the record for the most Best Supporting Actor wins in all four awards shows - he has won 3 awards in total.

Best Supporting Actress

- Fala Chen and Nancy Wu hold the joint record for winning Best Supporting Actress for the same role at 3 different award shows. Chen won for No Regrets in 2010 and Wu won for Gloves Come Off in 2012. Both of them also won the Best Supporting Actress at the Asian Television Awards for their respective roles. (Note - there was no StarHub TVB Awards for Best Supporting Actress category until 2014.)
- Fala Chen, Nancy Wu and Sharon Chan hold the record for most Best Supporting Actress wins in all four awards shows - they have each won 4 awards.

=== Top winners - Total ===
(TVB Anniversary Awards, Malaysia TVB Star Awards, StarHub TVB Awards Singapore, Asian Television Awards)

Rank	Artist	Award category	Total	HK	MY	SG	ATA
1	Charmaine Sheh	Leading Actress	10	2	4	3	1
2	Roger Kwok	Leading Actor	6	3	3	0	0
	Moses Chan	Leading Actor	6	1	3	1	1
	Ruco Chan	Leading Actor	6	1	2	3	0
3	Nancy Wu	Leading Actress	5	2	2	1	0
	Kevin Cheng	Leading Actor	5	2	1	1	1
4	Raymond Lam	Leading Actor	4	0	2	1	1
	Myolie Wu	Leading Actress	4	1	2	1	0
	Fala Chen	Supporting Actress	4	2	1	0	1
	Nancy Wu	Supporting Actress	4	1	2	0	1
	Sharon Chan	Supporting Actress	4	1	2	1	0
5	Gallen Lo	Leading Actor	3	3	0	0	0
	Wayne Lai	Leading Actor	3	3	0	0	0
	Tavia Yeung	Leading Actress	3	1	1	1	0
	Him Law	Supporting Actor	3	0	2	1	0
