= TVB Anniversary Award for Best Actress =

Hong Kong television award

- Awarded for: "Best Performance by an Actress in a Leading Role"
- Country: Hong Kong
- Presented by: Television Broadcasts Limited (TVB)
- First award: 1997
- Currently held by: Charmaine Sheh - The Queen of News 2 (2025)
- Website: http://birthday.tvb.com/

The TVB Anniversary Award for Best Actress in a Leading Role is one of the TVB Anniversary Awards presented annually by Television Broadcasts Limited (TVB) to recognize an actress who has delivered an outstanding performance in Hong Kong television dramas throughout the designated year. This award is usually reserved to be one of the last awards presented, and is one of the most premier and publicized awards of the ceremony. An actress who wins Best Actress is referred to as the TV Queen (視后). The leading contenders of the award, or those who reach the top 5 during nomination, are generally actresses currently considered as the fadans of TVB.

Since its institution in 1997, the award has changed names several times. It was first called the Best Performance by an Actress in a Drama (最佳劇中女角演繹大獎) in 1997, but was changed to Best Actress in a Leading Role (最佳女主角) in 1998. In 1999, the name was changed to My Favourite Leading Actress of the Year (本年度我最喜愛的女主角). The name was changed back to "Best Actress in a Leading Role" in 2005.

== Winners and nominees ==
TVB nominates at least ten actresses for the category each year. The following table lists only the actresses who have made it to the top five nominations during the designated awards ceremony.

Table key
†	Indicates the winner

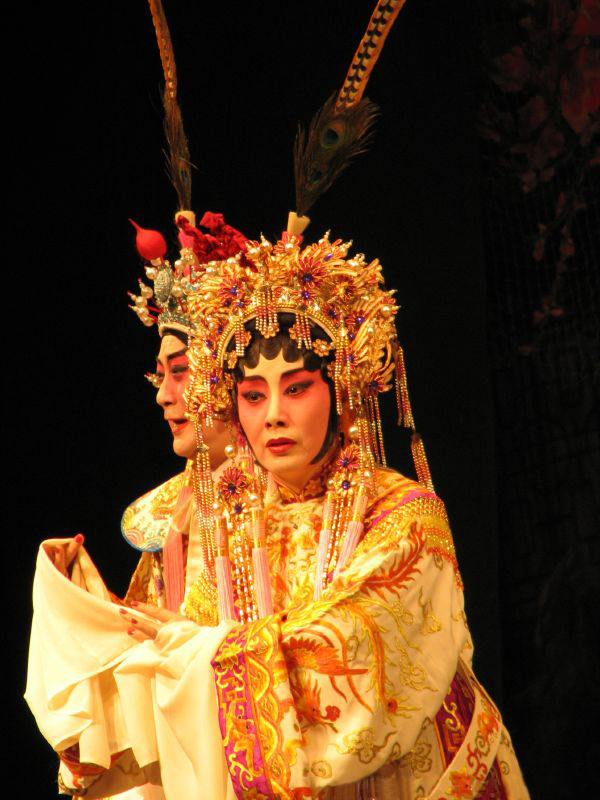
Liza Wang won two of her five top nominations, including her performances in 2001's The Awakening Story and 2005's Wars of In-Laws

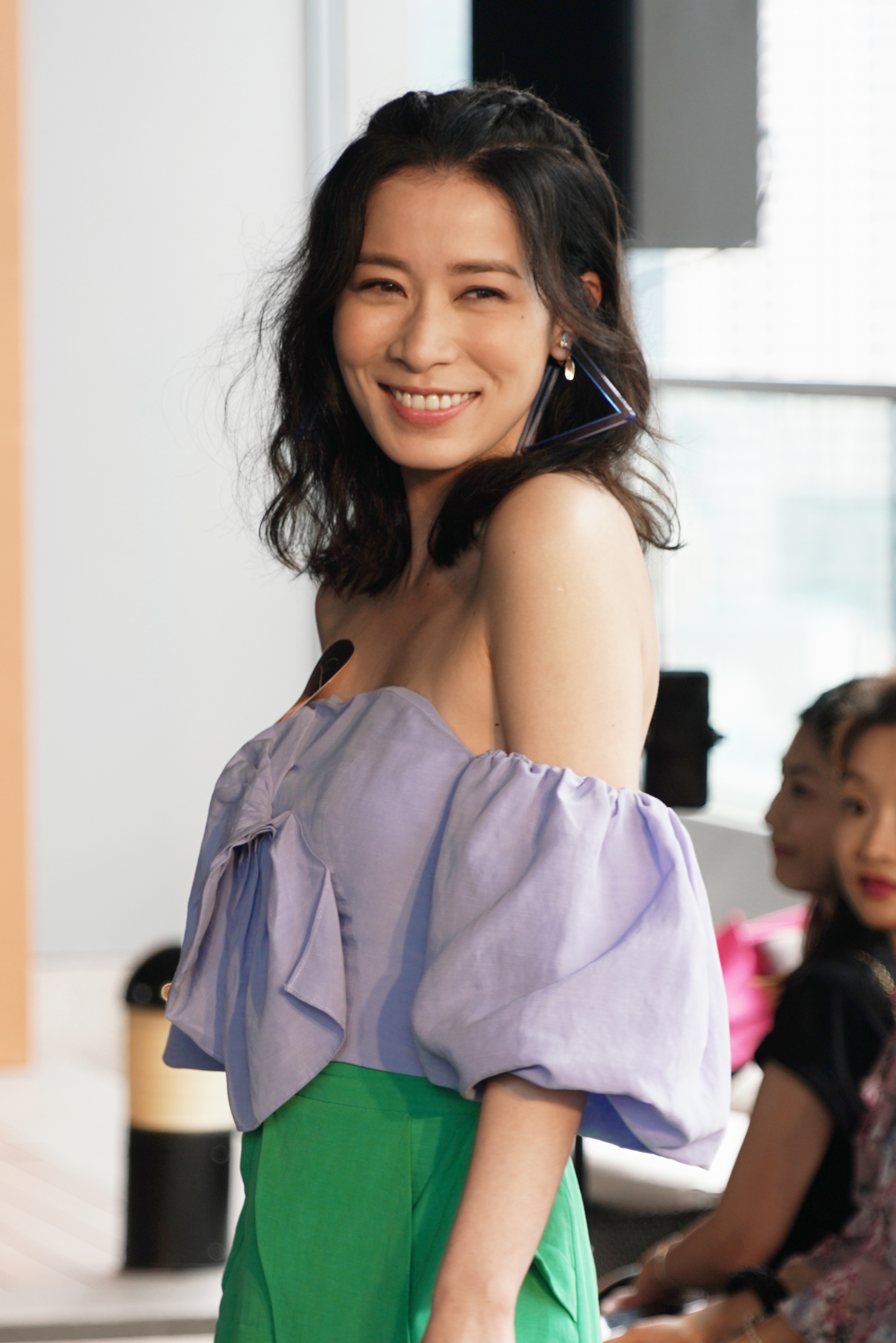
Charmaine Sheh was nominated twelfth times with four wins, including her performances in 2006's Maidens' Vow, 2014's Line Walker, 2023's The Queen of News, and 2025’s The Queen of News 2.

=== 1990s ===
Year	Actress	Drama	Role(s)
1997 (1st)
1997 (1st)	Esther Kwan †	Lady Flower Fist	Miu Chui-fa
1997 (1st)	Jessica Hsuan	Old Time Buddy	Siu Fong-fong
1997 (1st)	Maggie Cheung Ho-yee	Old Time Buddy	Ching Po-chu
1997 (1st)	Ada Choi	File of Justice V	Li-Tong
1997 (1st)	Kathy Chow	Time Before Time	Siu Fu-yung
1997 (1st)	Kenix Kwok	Detective Investigation Files III	Jessie Ko
1997 (1st)	Carman Lee	Demi-Gods and Semi-Devils	Wong Yu-yin / Madame Wong / Sister Angel
1998 (2nd)
1998 (2nd)	Ada Choi †	Secret of the Heart	Diana Sun
1998 (2nd)	Amy Kwok	Secret of the Heart	Yumi Koo
1998 (2nd)	Esther Kwan	Armed Reaction	Chu So-ngor
1998 (2nd)	Kenix Kwok	Crimes of Passion	Au-yeung Fung
1998 (2nd)	Flora Chan	Untraceable Evidence	Pauline Nip
1999 (3rd)
1999 (3rd)	Jessica Hsuan †	Detective Investigation Files IV	Quin Mo
1999 (3rd)	Esther Kwan	Burning Flame	Shum Bik-yiu
1999 (3rd)	Flora Chan	Untraceable Evidence II	Pauline Nip
1999 (3rd)	Ada Choi	A Matter of Business	Chai Hok-yee (Ah Suet)
1999 (3rd)	Mariane Chan	Life for Life	Chong Yuk-suet

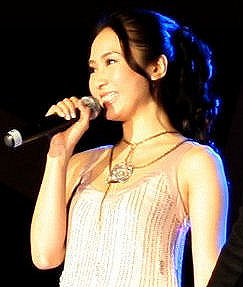
Gigi Lai won in 2004 for her performance in War and Beauty

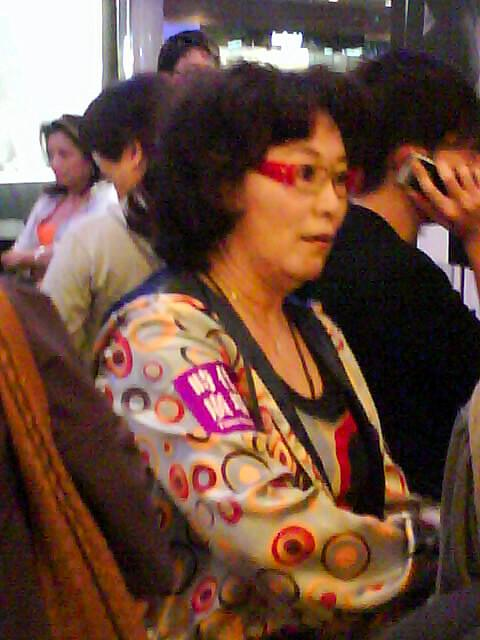
Louise Lee won in 2007 for her performance in Heart of Greed

=== 2000s ===
Year	Actress	Drama	Role(s)
2000 (4th)
2000 (4th)	Carol Cheng †	War of the Genders	Frances Mo
2000 (4th)	Maggie Cheung Ho-yee	Plain Love II	Poon Mui-nga
2000 (4th)	Nancy Sit	Return of the Cuckoo	Chu Sha-kiu (Q.E.)
2000 (4th)	Charmaine Sheh	Return of the Cuckoo	Chuk Kwan-ho
2000 (4th)	Jessica Hsuan	A Matter of Customs	Moon Hung
2001 (5th)
2001 (5th)	Liza Wang †	The Awakening Story	Lam Ho-suet
2001 (5th)	Charmaine Sheh	Country Spirit	Lai Shun-fung
2001 (5th)	Nancy Sit	Virtues of Harmony	Yau Nim-chee / Choi Fung Wong
2001 (5th)	Jessica Hsuan	A Step into the Past	Wu Ting-fong
2001 (5th)	Ada Choi	Armed Reaction III	Wai Ying-chi
2002 (6th)
2002 (6th)	Flora Chan †	Family Man	Tracy Ko
2002 (6th)	Kenix Kwok	Legal Entanglement	Shum Hok-yee
2002 (6th)	Ada Choi	Where the Legend Begins	Yan Fuk
2002 (6th)	Lydia Shum	Slim Chances	Salina Chong
2002 (6th)	Jessica Hsuan	Golden Faith	Rachel Ching
2003 (7th)
2003 (7th)	Maggie Cheung Ho-yee †	The King of Yesterday and Tomorrow	Lui Sei-leung
2003 (7th)	Kenix Kwok	Take My Word For It	WCIP Kit Kan
2003 (7th)	Jessica Hsuan	Square Pegs	Ling Choi-fung
2003 (7th)	Charmaine Sheh	Perish in the Name of Love	Princess Cheung-ping
2003 (7th)	Flora Chan	Triumph in the Skies	Isabelle "Belle" Lok
2004 (8th)
2004 (8th)	Gigi Lai †	War and Beauty	Hougiya Yuk-ying
2004 (8th)	Jessica Hsuan	Lady Fan	Fan Lei-fa
2004 (8th)	Charmaine Sheh	War and Beauty	Dongiya Yi-shun
2004 (8th)	Sheren Tang	War and Beauty	Niuhuru Yu-yuet
2004 (8th)	Kenix Kwok	Shine on You	Wong Yeuk-sze
2005 (9th)
2005 (9th)	Liza Wang †	Wars of In-Laws	Hitara Shek-lan
2005 (9th)	Myolie Wu	Wars of In-Laws	Tin Lik (Eleven)
2005 (9th)	Kenix Kwok	Revolving Doors of Vengeance	Becky Koo
2005 (9th)	Gigi Lai	The Charm Beneath	Chuk Ming-wai
2005 (9th)	Jessica Hsuan	Life Made Simple	Catherine Wong
2006 (10th)
2006 (10th)	Charmaine Sheh †	Maidens' Vow	Ngai Yu-fung / Wang Chi-kwan / Jenny Pak / Tai Sze-ka
2006 (10th)	Sheren Tang	La Femme Desperado	Hilda Hoi
2006 (10th)	Ada Choi	The Dance of Passion	Chiu Yuk
2006 (10th)	Gigi Lai	The Dance of Passion	Kai Ming-fung
2006 (10th)	Myolie Wu	To Grow with Love	Tina Ho
2007 (11th)
2007 (11th)	Louise Lee †	Heart of Greed	Ling Hau
2007 (11th)	Charmaine Sheh	Glittering Days	Chu Yuk-lan
2007 (11th)	Jessica Hsuan	Dicey Business	Lee Ching-wan
2007 (11th)	Susanna Kwan	Heart of Greed	Wong Sau-kam
2007 (11th)	Sheren Tang	The Family Link	Mung Ka-ka
2008 (12th)
2008 (12th)	Michelle Yim †	Moonlight Resonance	Yan Hung
2008 (12th)	Liza Wang	Wars of In-Laws II	Ophelia Gwo
2008 (12th)	Sonija Kwok	D.I.E.	WIP Ying Jing-jing
2008 (12th)	Linda Chung	A Journey Called Life	Sze Ka-ka
2008 (12th)	Louise Lee	Moonlight Resonance	Chung Siu-ho
2009 (13th)
2009 (13th)	Sheren Tang †	Rosy Business	Hong Po-kei
2009 (13th)	Ada Choi	The Gem of Life	Jessica Hong
2009 (13th)	Teresa Mo	Off Pedder	Yan Sheung
2009 (13th)	Charmaine Sheh	Beyond the Realm of Conscience	Lau Sam-ho
2009 (13th)	Tavia Yeung	Beyond the Realm of Conscience	Yiu Kam-ling

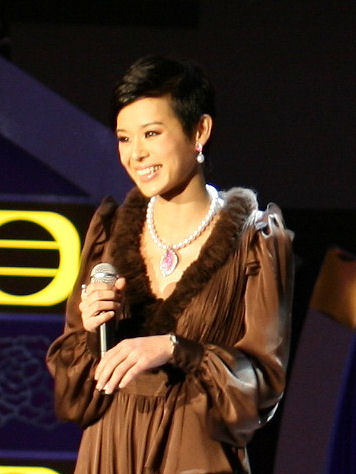
Myolie Wu won in 2011 for her performance in Curse of the Royal Harem

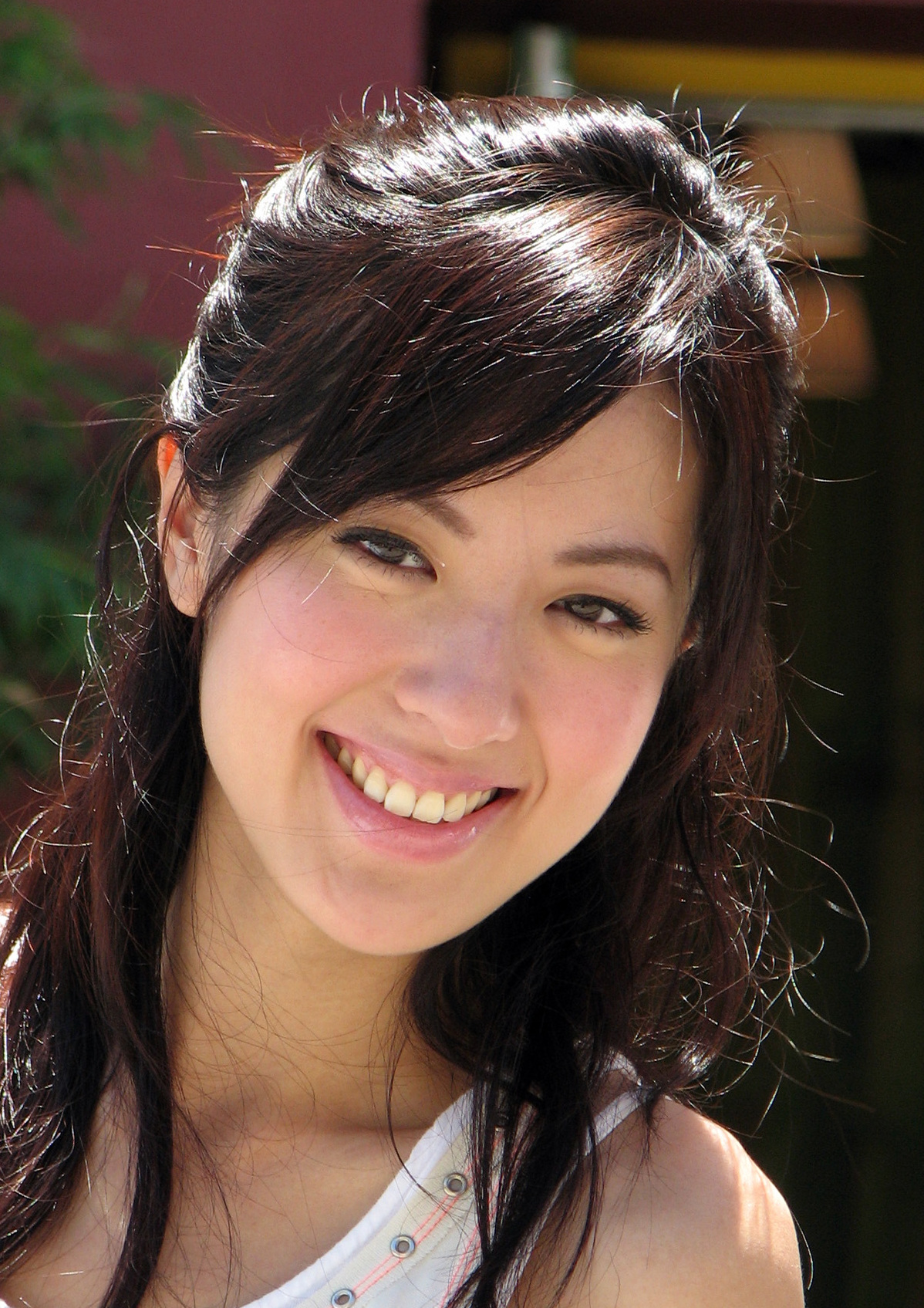
Natalie Tong received her first top ten nomination and won for her performance in My Unfair Lady (2017)

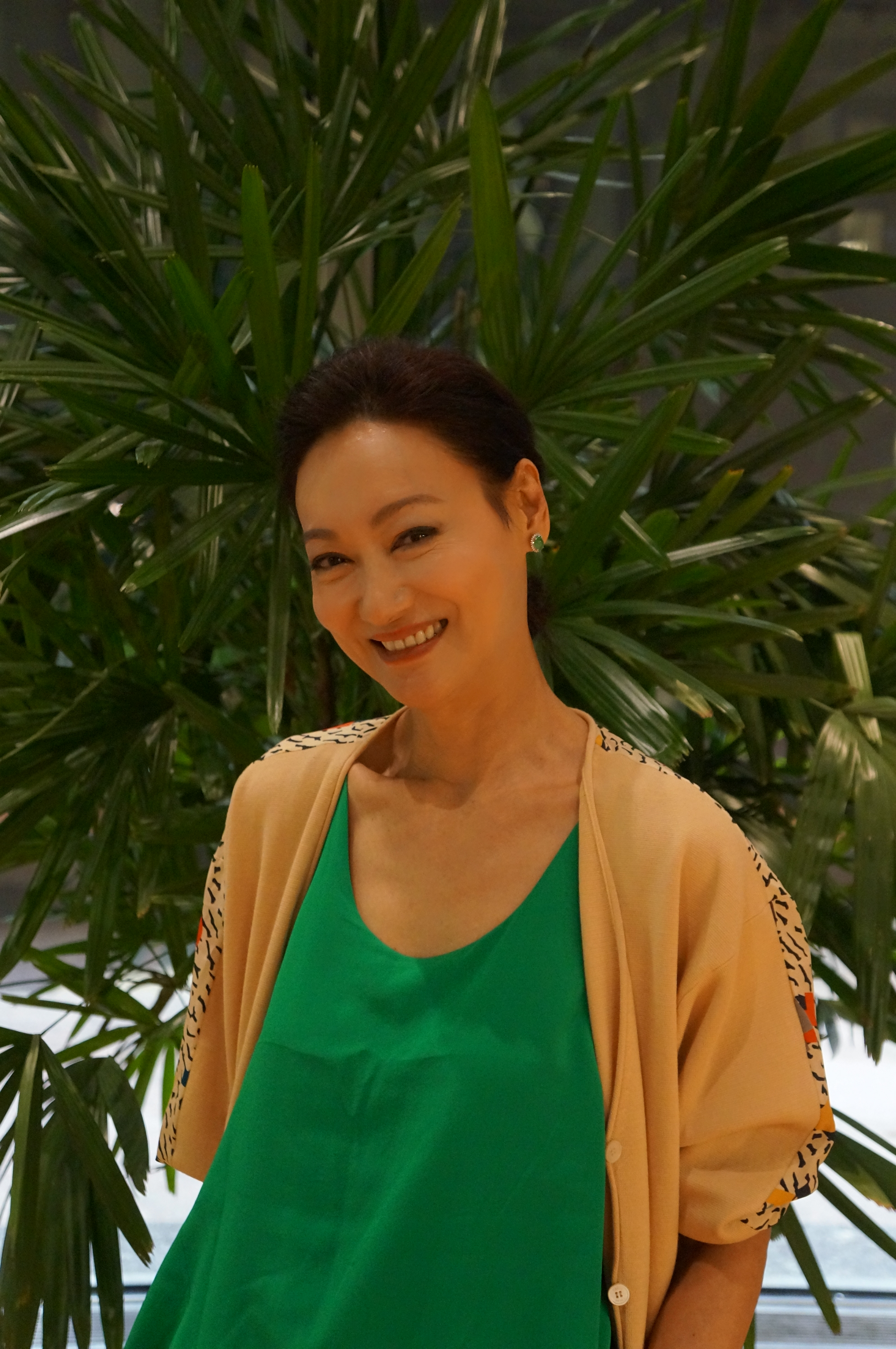
Kara Wai received her first nomination and won for her performance in The Defected (2019)

=== 2010s ===
Year	Actress	Drama	Role(s)
2010 (14th)
2010 (14th)	Sheren Tang †	No Regrets	Cheng Kau-mui (Miss Kau)
2010 (14th)	Tavia Yeung	The Mysteries of Love	Tsui Siu-lai
2010 (14th)	Linda Chung	Ghost Writer	Lau Sum-yu
2010 (14th)	Maggie Cheung Ho-yee	Beauty Knows No Pain	Jackie Sha
2010 (14th)	Charmaine Sheh	Can't Buy Me Love	Princes Chiu-yeung
2011 (15th)
2011 (15th)	Myolie Wu †	Curse of the Royal Harem	Yuen-yuen, the Empress Consort Hao-sun
2011 (15th)	Liza Wang	Home Troopers	Lai Ka-ka
2011 (15th)	Linda Chung	Yes, Sir. Sorry, Sir!	Carman "Miss Cool" Koo
2011 (15th)	Fala Chen	Lives of Omission	WSIP Jodie "Madam Jo" Chau
2011 (15th)	Maggie Cheung Ho-yee	Forensic Heroes III	Dr. Mandy Chung
2012 (16th)
2012 (16th)	Tavia Yeung †	Silver Spoon, Sterling Shackles	Hong Tze-kwan
2012 (16th)	Charmaine Sheh	When Heaven Burns	Hazel "Yan" Yip
2012 (16th)	Linda Chung	Witness Insecurity	Hailey Kiu
2012 (16th)	Kate Tsui	Highs and Lows	Pat Chan
2012 (16th)	Michelle Yim	The Confidant	Empress Dowager Chee-hei
2013 (17th)
2013 (17th)	Kristal Tin †	Brother's Keeper	Yiu Man-ying
2013 (17th)	Linda Chung	Brother's Keeper	Rachel Cheuk
2013 (17th)	Fala Chen	Triumph in the Skies II	Holiday Ho
2013 (17th)	Tavia Yeung	The Hippocratic Crush II	Dr. Hong Tsz-yu
2013 (17th)	Kate Tsui	Bounty Lady	Jennifer Shing
2014 (18th)
2014 (18th)	Charmaine Sheh †	Line Walker	Ding Siu-ka
2014 (18th)	Tavia Yeung	Storm in a Cocoon	Tong Bing-bing
2014 (18th)	Kristal Tin	Black Heart White Soul	May Tam
2014 (18th)	Linda Chung	All That Is Bitter Is Sweet	To Ga-kei
2014 (18th)	Kate Tsui	Tomorrow Is Another Day	Yiu Ngoi-ka
2015 (19th)
2015 (19th)	Nancy Wu †	Ghost of Relativity	Gin Keung
2015 (19th)	Liza Wang	Limelight Years	Wah Fong-ying
2015 (19th)	Linda Chung	Limelight Years	Szeto Tik-tik
2015 (19th)	Kristal Tin †	Ghost of Relativity	May Suen
2015 (19th)	Tavia Yeung	Momentary Lapse of Reason	Leung Sam
2016 (20th)
2016 (20th)	Nancy Wu †	A Fist Within Four Walls	Tiu Lan
2016 (20th)	Maggie Shiu	The Executioner	Fa Yui-hung
2016 (20th)	Tracy Chu	Over Run Over	Ling Sun-fung
2016 (20th)	Kristal Tin	Brother's Keeper II	Yiu Man-ying
2016 (20th)	Priscilla Wong	Two Steps from Heaven	Max Koo
2017 (21st)
2017 (21st)	Natalie Tong †	My Unfair Lady	Cherry Ling
2017 (21st)	Jessica Hsuan	My Unfair Lady	Molly Ling
2017 (21st)	Nina Paw	The Unholy Alliance	Ling Hung
2017 (21st)	Nancy Wu	The Unholy Alliance	Yuen Ching-yan
2017 (21st)	Ali Lee	My Ages Apart	Paris Sheung
2018 (22nd)
2018 (22nd)	Ali Lee †	Who Wants A Baby?	Ellen Tong Tim Yee
2018 (22nd)	Alice Chan	Deep in the Realm of Conscience	Princess Taiping
2018 (22nd)	Mandy Wong	Threesome	Evie Fong
2018 (22nd)	Nancy Wu	Deep in the Realm of Conscience	Wong Zhen
2018 (22nd)	Tavia Yeung	Another Era	Hayley Cheung Ming Hei
2019 (23rd)
2019 (23rd)	Kara Wai †	The Defected	Man Hei-wah
2019 (23rd)	Selena Lee	Barrack O'Karma	Cheung Wai / Yeung Yuk-wah
2019 (23rd)	Ali Lee	Big White Duel	Ching Lok-man
2019 (23rd)	Natalie Tong	Big White Duel	So Yee
2019 (23rd)	Miriam Yeung	Wonder Women	Lam Fei

=== 2020s ===
Year	Actress	Drama	Role(s)
2020 (24th)
2020 (24th)	Sisley Choi †	Legal Mavericks 2020	Deanie "Dino" Chiu Ching-mui
2020 (24th)	Mandy Lam	Come Home Love: Lo and Behold	Linda Lung Lik-lin
2020 (24th)	Katy Kung	Death By Zero	Nana Yik Lan
2020 (24th)	Ali Lee	Death By Zero	Cash Chin Heung-sin
2020 (24th)	Mandy Wong	Line Waker: Bull Fight	"Madam G" Cheung Kei-gee
2021 (25th)
2021 (25th)	Rosina Lam †	Battle Of The Seven Sisters	Grace Koo Yu-yin
2021 (25th)	Mandy Wong	The Line Watchers	Kwan Pui Yan
2021 (25th)	Linda Chung	Kids' Lives Matter	Cheung Yi Sam
2021 (25th)	Elaine Yiu	The Ringmaster	Leoi Kin / "Anson"
2021 (25th)	Ali Lee	AI Romantic	A Bou / Abby
2022 (26th)
2022 (26th)	Elena Kong †	Get On A Flat	Karen Mok Man-Wai
2022 (26th)	Selena Lee	Barrack O'Karma 1968	Ella／Female doctor／Lydia／Alex／Coco
2022 (26th)	Alice Chan	Communion	Tang Lai-kuen
2022 (26th)	Jeannie Chan	Your Highness	Nap Hak Wan-Yau / Man Yi
2022 (26th)	Nina Paw	Get On A Flat	Tse Yuk-ha
2023 (27th)
2023 (27th)	Charmaine Sheh †	The Queen of News	Man Wai-sum
2023 (27th)	Selena Lee	The Queen of News	Cheung Ka-yin
2023 (27th)	Moon Lau	The Invisibles	Shadow To Siu-Chik
2023 (27th)	Katy Kung	Unchained Medley	Wan Lau-fong
2023 (27th)	Jinny Ng	From Hong Kong to Beijing	Kwong Hoi-lun
2024 (27th)
2024 (27th)	Katy Kung †	Big Biz Duel	Fong Fong
2024 (27th)	Kelly Cheung	Big Biz Duel	Song Kiu
2024 (27th)	Elaine Yiu	No Room For Crime	Lam Suet-Yi
2024 (27th)	Tavia Yeung	Darkside of the Moon	Yu Moon-Yuet
2024 (27th)	Rosina Lam	Darkside of the Moon	Cheuk Wai-Wan
2025 (28th)
2025 (28th)	Charmaine Sheh †	The Queen of News 2	Man Wai-sum
2025 (28th)	Selena Lee	The Queen of News 2	Cheung Ka-yin
2025 (28th)	Jessica Hsuan	The Queen of Castle	Lam Suet-Yi
2025 (28th)	Hera Chan	The Fading Gold	Lam Ching
2025 (28th)	Moon Lau	Anonymous Signal	Keung Hey-man

== Records ==
Most wins

Wins	Actress
4	Charmaine Sheh
2	Liza Wang
2	Sheren Tang
2	Nancy Wu
2	Krystal Tin

Most top 5 nominations

Nominations	Actress
12	Charmaine Sheh
10	Jessica Hsuan
8	Tavia Yeung
7	Ada Choi
7	Linda Chung
6	Kenix Kwok
5	Maggie Cheung Ho-yee
5	Ali Lee
5	Sheren Tang
5	Liza Wang

Age superlatives

Record	Actress	TV drama	Age (in years)
Oldest winner	Kara Wai	The Defected	59
Oldest top 5 nominee	Nina Paw	Get on a Flat	73
Youngest winner	Ada Choi	Secret of the Heart	25
Youngest top 5 nominee	Ada Choi	File of Justice V	24
