= Big White Duel =

Hong Kong TV series

- Official poster
- Chinese: 白色強人
- Literal meaning: White Strongmen
- Hanyu Pinyin: bái sè qiáng rén
- Jyutping: baak6 sik1 koeng4 jan4
- Genre: Medical drama
- Created by: Marco Law Wing-yin
- Written by: Wong Wai-keung
- Starring: Roger Kwok; Kenneth Ma; Natalie Tong; Ali Lee; Kelly Cheung; Matthew Ho; Crystal Fung; David Chiang; Ram Chiang; Ashley Chu
- Theme music composer: Alan Cheung
- Opening theme: "Choice" (選擇善良) by Fred Cheng
- Ending theme: "Without You" (沒有你開始) by Hana Kuk
- Composer: Alan Cheung
- Country of origin: Hong Kong
- Original languages: Cantonese; Mandarin
- No. of episodes: 25

Production
- Executive producer: Marco Law
- Production locations: Hong Kong; Shenzhen, China
- Running time: 45 minutes
- Production company: TVB

Original release
- Network: TVB Jade
- Release: 10 June – 12 July 2019

Big White Duel (Chinese: 白色強人; Cantonese Yale: baahk sīk kèuhng yàhn) is a 2019 Hong Kong television medical drama produced by Marco Law and TVB. It stars Roger Kwok, Kenneth Ma, Natalie Tong, Ali Lee and Kelly Cheung as the main leads. The series follows a team of medical practitioners at the fictional Marshall Paxton Hospital, Hong Kong's leading public hospital, with its central plot structuring around the hospital's Deputy C.E., Dr. YT Yeung's (Roger Kwok) attempts in rallying support for a new healthcare plan that would change the landscape of Hong Kong's healthcare system. Big White Duel premiered on TVB Jade in Hong Kong on 10 June 2019, and aired its final episode on 12 July 2019. It aired on Mediacorp's Channel 8 on 18 March 2020 and concluded on 25 May 2020. A second season was released in 2022.

Big White Duel received critical acclaim throughout its broadcast period. It is currently sitting as Hong Kong's second highest-rated television drama of 2019, and garnered multiple awards and nominations at the StarHub Night of Star Awards and TVB Anniversary Awards, including Best Actor and Best TVB Male Artiste for Kenneth Ma, Best TVB Female Artiste for Natalie Tong, Most Improved Female Artiste for Kelly Cheung and Best Drama.

== Series overview ==
Hong Kong's leading public hospital, Marshall Paxton, is being used as a trial ground for a radical reform project that could potentially change the future of Hong Kong's healthcare system. As medical practitioners at Marshall Paxton regularly face ethical dilemmas that challenge their professionalism, they are also being put in the middle of a power struggle between Deputy C.E. Dr. YT Yeung, who seeks for healthcare reform and for the spot of C.E., and the hospital's current C.E. Dr. Lui Chung-hok, who wants to keep the status quo. Fictional depictions of the Hospital Authority (known in the series as the Medical Development Authority), the Department of Health, and the Legislative Council of Hong Kong (LegCo) are prominent entities that drive the plot.

=== Plot ===
It centers on Dr. YT Yeung (Roger Kwok), the Deputy Chief Executive of Marshall Paxton Hospital and his radical proposal to completely change the hospital's bureaucratic model by privatizing the public hospitals and raise capital by the means of public listing to maintain hospital operations, but is met with opposition from Dr. Tong Ming (Kenneth Ma), who was placed by the Chief Executive of Marshal Paxton to be the head of the hospital's cardiology department. Tong Ming believed that YT Yeung's proposed changes could affect the poor's accessibility to healthcare has a totally different ideology compared to YT's. He has fought alongside his apprentice Dr. Max Poon (Matthew Ho) in accordance with the life-saving principle that is to hold human life above the healthcare system, but they are instead dragged into the power struggle initiated by Dr. Lui Chung-hok, CE of Marshal Paxton. In Marshall Paxton Hospital, Tong Ming is reunited with A&E's Dr. Zoe So (Natalie Tong) who is his ex-wife.

== Production ==
Big White Duel was first announced in late 2017 as a new installment to Marco Law's Strongmen series, which started with the legal drama Law dis-Order in 2016. Initially produced with the working title White Giants (白色巨人), the new series would follow a similar to theme to Law dis-Order, in which career professionals engage in political games to consolidate power. Law employed the same team behind Law dis-Order for Big White Duel, including scriptwriter Wong Wai-keung.

Moses Chan and Ruco Chan were initially sought out to respectively star as Dr. YT Yeung and Dr. Tong Ming. After turning down the roles, TVB cast Roger Kwok and Kenneth Ma in December 2017. Big White Duel became Kwok's last TVB drama in his management contract. The role of Dr. Patrick Lam was first offered to Jason Chan, and then to Oscar Leung, but both turned down the role due to schedule conflicts. The role ultimately went to Stephen Wong.

In February 2018, Big White Duel held its first costume fitting press conference. Filming commenced that same month in Tuen Mun, and later in Shenzhen, China. Principal photography focused on locations in Tuen Mun's T PARK, Shenzhen's Horizontal Skyscraper, and the Qianhai Shenzhen-Hong Kong Youth Innovation and Entrepreneur Hub, which were used as backdrops for Marshall Paxton Hospital. Principal photography ended in July 2018 with a wrap-up party held on 2 July 2018.

== Cast and characters ==
=== Marshall Paxton Hospital ===
| Name | Portrayed by | Occupation |
|---|---|---|
| Dr. Lui Chung-hok | David Chiang | Chief Executive of Marshall Paxton, Cardiothoracic surgeon and consultant. Appointed as Honorary Advisor of Marshall Paxton after recover from his surgery. |
| Dr. "YT" Yeung Yat-to | Roger Kwok | Deputy Chief Executive of Marshall Paxton, Head of Surgery Department, Chief of Service (C.O.S.) for the Neuroendovascular Surgery (NES) Department, Neurosurgeon. Become Chief Executive of Marshall Paxton after Dr. Lui's retirement. |
| Dr. Tong Ming | Kenneth Ma | C.O.S. for the Department of Cardiothoracic Surgery (CTS), Cardiothoracic surgeon. Become Deputy Chief Executive of Marshall Paxton after Dr. Lui's retirement. |
| Dr. "Samuel" Yu Cham-sum | Ram Chiang | C.O.S. for the Department of Accident & Emergency (A&E) |
| Dr. "Zoe" So Yee | Natalie Tong | A&E Associate Consultant |
| Dr. "Kennis" Ching Lok-man | Ali Lee | CTS Associate Consultant and Cardiothoracic surgeon, later promoted as Cardiothoracic Consultant |
| Dr. "Yan" Lui Ngoi-ling | Kelly Cheung | NES Resident Specialist and Neurosurgeon, later promoted as NES Associate Consultant |
| Dr. "Max" Poon Wai-tak | Matthew Ho | CTS Resident Specialist and Cardiothoracic surgeon, later promoted as CTS Associate Consultant |
| Dr. "Ceci" Fong Shu-ting | Crystal Fung | CTS Resident Specialist |
| Dr. "Patrick" Lam Hok-kei | Stephen Wong | NES Associate Consultant, Neurosurgeon |
| Dr. "Hugo" Ho Bing-kwong | Willie Wai | CTS Associate Consultant, Cardiothoracic surgeon |
| Wong Ching, RN | Lily Poon | A&E Nurse Consultant |
| "Macy" Wai Man-yi, RN | Moss Wu | A&E Associate Nurse Consultant |

=== Government officials ===
| Name | Portrayed by | Occupation |
|---|---|---|
| Kwok Yat-choi | Keith Ng | Chief Executive of Hong Kong |
| Chung Kin-sing | English Tang | LegCo President |
| Dr. Cheung Sat-chau | Willie Lau | Department of Health Secretary |
| Dr. "Ivan" Yau Kwok-tung | Timothy Cheng | Deputy Health Secretary, Gastroenterologist |
| Dr. "Martin" Wan Ming-cheung | Max Cheung | Chairman for the Medical Development Authority |
| Lam Hoi-sang | Chan Wing-chun | LegCo Party chairman |
| Ng Wing-yip | Gary Tam | LegCo legislator |

==== Senior Management ====
| Cast | Role | Description |
|---|---|---|
| David Chiang 姜大衞 | Lui Chung-hok 呂仲學 | Dr. Lui: Marshall Paxton Chief Executive → Honorary Adviser → Health Secretary; Father of Lui Ngoi-ling; Opposed to the healthcare reform bill |
| Roger Kwok 郭晉安 | Yeung Yat-to 楊逸滔 | YT, YT Yeung: Marshall Paxton Deputy Chief Executive → Acting Chief Executive of Marshall Paxton → Chief Executive of Marshall Paxton; Supporter of the healthcare reform bill, later opposed after found out healthcare reform bill change its ideology. |
| Kenneth Ma 馬國明 | Tong Ming 唐明 | Marshall Paxton Deputy Chief Executive; Opposed to the healthcare reform bill |

==== Neuroendovascular Surgery (NES) ====
| Cast | Role | Description |
|---|---|---|
| Roger Kwok 郭晉安 | Yeung Yat-to 楊逸滔 | YT, YT Yeung, Dr. Yeung: Department Chief of Service & Consultant |
| Stephen Wong 黃嘉樂 | Lam Hok-kei 林學祈 | Patrick, Dr. Lam: Associate Consultant → Consultant; Son of Lam Hoi-sang |
| Kelly Cheung 張曦雯 | Lui Ngoi-ling 呂靄寧 | Yan, Dr. Lui: Resident Specialist → Associate Consultant; Daughter of Lui Chung-hok; Best friends with Zoe and Kennis; Has a crush on YT |

==== Cardiothoracic Surgery (CTS) ====
| Cast | Role | Description |
|---|---|---|
| Kenneth Ma 馬國明 | Tong Ming 唐明 | Dr. Tong: Department Chief of Service & Consultant; Former Consultant of Chak On Hospital; Best friend with Samuel; Has a love triangle with Zoe and Kennis; Ex-husband of Zoe, later remarried; Mentor of Poon Wai-tak |
| Ali Lee 李佳芯 | Ching Lok-man 程洛雯 | Kennis, Dr. Ching: Associate Consultant → Consultant → Doctors Without Borders (MSF); Best friends with Zoe and Yan; Has a crush on Tong Ming; Underwent Cardiac Auto-transplantation by Tong Ming in episode 24; Became a Doctor Without Borders in episode 25; Shot in episode 25, fate unknown |
| Willie Wai 韋家雄 | Ho Bing-kwong 何秉光 | Hugo, Dr. Ho: Associate Consultant; Mean to everyone in the Cardiothoracic Surgery department; Jealous of Kennis’ skills and admiration by YT; Wife involved in accident and later dies with organs donated; Hard working doctor after the death of his wife |
| Matthew Ho 何廣沛 | Poon Wai-tak 潘懷德 | Max, Dr. Poon: Resident Specialist → Associate Consultant; Boyfriend of Fong Shu-ting |
| Crystal Fung 馮盈盈 | Fong Shu-ting 方書婷 | Ceci, Dr. Fong: Resident Specialist; Girlfriend of Poon Wai-tak |

==== Accident & Emergency (A & E) ====
| Cast | Role | Description |
|---|---|---|
| Ram Chiang 蔣志光 | Yu Cham-sum 余湛琛 | Samuel, Dr. Yu: Department Chief of Service & Consultant; Best friend with Tong Ming; Has a crush on Zoe |
| Natalie Tong 唐詩詠 | So Yee 蘇怡 | Zoe, Dr. So: Associate Consultant; Best friends with Kennis and Yan; Ex-wife of Tong Ming, later remarried |

==== Nursing ====
| Cast | Role | Description |
|---|---|---|
| Lily Poon 潘芳芳 | Wong Ching 汪澄 | Deputy Head nurse; Advanced Practice Nurse; A & E Nurse |
| Moss Wu 吳沚默 | Wai Man-yi 韋文意 | Macy: Registered Nurse; A & E Nurse; Has a crush on Poon Wai-tak |

=== Other cast ===
| Cast | Role | Description |
|---|---|---|
| Ashley Chu 朱智賢 | Hong Kiu 康橋 | Eugene: TNN producer; Wife of Martin, later divorced; Has a crush on YT; Supporter of the healthcare reform bill, later opposed |
| Max Cheung 張達倫 | Wan Ming-cheung 溫銘章 | Martin, Dr. Wan: Medical Development Authority Chairman; Husband of Eugene, later divorced; Supporter of the healthcare reform bill, later opposed |
| Timothy Cheng 鄭子誠 | Yau Kwok-tung 游國棟 | Ivan, Dr. Yau: Deputy Health Secretary → Health Secretary → Resigned after healthcare reform bill did not pass; Supporter of the healthcare reform bill; Threatened Kennis using her cardiac health history |
| Chan Wing-chun 陳榮峻 | Lam Hoi-sang 林海生 | Ruling Legislative Council Party Chairman; Father of Lam Hok-kei; Supporter of the healthcare reform bill for business gain. |
| Gary Tam 譚偉權 | Ng Wing-yip 吳榮業 | Councillor Ng: Legislative Council Opposition Member; Opposed to the healthcare reform bill |
| Keith Ng 吳瑞庭 | Kwok Yat-choi 郭逸材 | Hong Kong Chief Executive |
| Leo Lo 盧海鷹 | Chui Tse-go 徐子高 | Trading company salesman; Mental Patient; Gunman |

== Viewership ratings ==
=== TVB Jade ===
| # | Timeslot (HKT) | Week | Episode(s) | Average points | Peaking points |
|---|---|---|---|---|---|
| 1 | Mon – Fri 21:30 | 10 — 14 June 2019 | 1 — 5 | 28 | 29 |
| 2 | Mon – Fri 21:30 | 17 — 21 June 2019 | 6 — 10 | 28 | 29 |
| 3 | Mon – Fri 21:30 | 24 — 28 June 2019 | 11 — 15 | 28 | — |
| 4 | Mon – Fri 21:30 | 1 — 5 July 2019 | 16 — 20 | 28 | — |
| 5 | Mon – Fri 21:30 | 8 — 12 July 2019 | 21 — 25 | 31 | 32 |
| Total average | | | | 29 | 30 |

== International broadcast ==
| Region | Network | Notes |
|---|---|---|
| Malaysia | 8TV | |
| Singapore | VV Drama & MediaCorp Channel 8 | Dubbed With Mandarin |
| Cambodia | PNN TV | Dubbed With Khmer |

| Network(s)/Station(s) | Series premiere | | Title |
|---|---|---|---|
| Hong Kong; Macau | TVB Anywhere, TVB Jade | June 10, 2019 – July 12, 2019 (Monday to Friday 21:30-22:30) | 白色強人 (Big White Duel; lit: ) |
| Singapore; Malaysia | TVB Jade | June 10, 2019 – July 12, 2019 (Monday to Friday 21:30-22:30) | 白色強人 (Big White Duel; lit: ) |
| Malaysia | Astro AOD | June 10, 2019 – July 12, 2019 (Monday to Friday 21:30-22:30) | 白色強人 (Big White Duel; lit: ) |
| Malaysia | 8TV | December 9, 2020 – January 12, 2021 (The best of TVB Monday to Friday 19:00-19:58) | 白色強人 (Big White Duel; lit: ) |
| Singapore | Hub Drama First | June 10, 2019 – July 12, 2019 (Monday to Friday 21:30-22:30) | 白色強人 (Big White Duel; lit: ) |
| Singapore | Hub VV Drama | October 22, 2019 – November 25, 2019 (Episode premiere Monday to Friday 20:00-21:00) | 白色強人 (Big White Duel; lit: ) |
| Singapore | Channel 8 | March 18, 2020 – May 26, 2020 (Monday to Friday 19:30-20:00 (A half episode of the original version is broadcast every time)) | 白色強人 (Big White Duel; lit: ) |
| Australia | TVBJ (Australia) | June 11, 2019 – July 13, 2019 (Tuesday to Saturday 21:30-22:30) | 白色強人 (Big White Duel; lit: ) |
| United States | TVBe | June 10, 2019 – July 12, 2019 (Monday to Friday Gold Drama Theater Hours 16:00-17:00) | 白色強人 (Big White Duel; lit: ) |
| United States | TVB1 | December 2, 2019 – January 3, 2020 (Gold Drama Theater Monday to Friday 22:00-23:00 EDT) | 白色強人 (Big White Duel; lit: ) |
| Cambodia | PNN TV | 2019 () | Big White Duel ( ; lit: ) |
| Thailand | Channel 3 (33) | December 19, 2020 - January 00, 2021 (Every night Monday to Sunday afternoon 3:43-04.27) | Big White Duel ทีมแพทย์หัวใจทระนง ( ; lit: ) |

== Awards and nominations ==
| Year | Award | Category | Recipient(s) | Result | Ref. |
|---|---|---|---|---|---|
| 2019 | 2019 TVB Anniversary Awards | Best Actor | Kenneth Ma | Won | |
| 2019 | 2019 TVB Anniversary Awards | Best Actor | Roger Kwok | Nominated | |
| 2019 | 2019 TVB Anniversary Awards | Best Actress | Ali Lee | Nominated (Top 5) | |
| 2019 | 2019 TVB Anniversary Awards | Best Actress | Natalie Tong | Nominated (Top 5) | |
| 2019 | 2019 TVB Anniversary Awards | Best Actress | Kelly Cheung | Nominated | |
| 2019 | 2019 TVB Anniversary Awards | Best Supporting Actor | David Chiang | Nominated (Top 5) | |
| 2019 | 2019 TVB Anniversary Awards | Best Supporting Actor | Matthew Ho | Nominated (Top 5) | |
| 2019 | 2019 TVB Anniversary Awards | Best Supporting Actor | Max Cheung | Nominated | |
| 2019 | 2019 TVB Anniversary Awards | Best Supporting Actor | Ram Chiang | Nominated | |
| 2019 | 2019 TVB Anniversary Awards | Best Supporting Actress | Ashley Chu | Nominated | |
| 2019 | 2019 TVB Anniversary Awards | Best Supporting Actress | Crystal Fung | Nominated | |
| 2019 | 2019 TVB Anniversary Awards | Most Popular Male Character | Kenneth Ma | Nominated (Top 5) | |
| 2019 | 2019 TVB Anniversary Awards | Most Popular Male Character | Matthew Ho | Nominated | |
| 2019 | 2019 TVB Anniversary Awards | Most Popular Male Character | Roger Kwok | Nominated | |
| 2019 | 2019 TVB Anniversary Awards | Most Popular Female Character | Natalie Tong | Nominated (Top 5) | |
| 2019 | 2019 TVB Anniversary Awards | Most Popular Female Character | Kelly Cheung | Nominated | |
| 2019 | 2019 TVB Anniversary Awards | Most Popular Female Character | Ali Lee | Nominated | |
| 2019 | 2019 TVB Anniversary Awards | Best Drama | —N/a | Won | |
| 2020 | New York Festivals TV & Films Awards | Mini-Series (finalist) | Itself | Won | |
