= Law Enforcers =

2001 Hong Kong action crime thriller television series

- Official poster
- 勇探實錄
- Genre: Crime thriller Action
- Screenplay by: Leung Yan-tung; Fung Ching-man; Law Kam-fai; Ha Chi-him; Chow Yin-han; Yip Sai-hong; Szeto Kam-Yuen
- Directed by: So Man-chung; Wong Chiu-ying; Ng Ka-kan; Chan San-hap; Lau Chun-ming
- Starring: Roger Kwok; Fennie Yuen; Nick Cheung; Benz Hui; Lo Koon-lan; Alice Lau; Bowie Wu; Hawick Lau; Halina Tam
- Theme music composer: Yang Do-ui
- Opening theme: Nothing Normal (無常) by Nick Cheung
- Country of origin: Hong Kong
- Original language: Cantonese
- No. of episodes: 20

Production
- Producer: Lam Chi-wah
- Production location: Hong Kong
- Camera setup: Multi camera
- Production company: TVB

Original release
- Network: TVB Jade
- Release: 24 December 2001 – 18 January 2002

Law Enforcers
- Traditional Chinese: 勇探實錄
- Simplified Chinese: 勇探实录
- Literal meaning: "Brave Detective's Record"
Transcriptions
Standard Mandarin
- Hanyu Pinyin: Yǒng Tàn Shí Lù
Yue: Cantonese
- Jyutping: Jung5 Taam3 Sat6 Luk6

Law Enforcers is a 2001 Hong Kong action crime thriller television series produced by TVB and starring Roger Kwok, Fennie Yuen and Nick Cheung. It was released overseas in June 2001 and premiered on TVB Jade on 24 December 2001.

== Cast ==
=== Yau Tsim District Anti Triad Bureau ===
- Roger Kwok as Cheung Kwok-fung (張國鋒), the main protagonist of the series, Senior Inspector of Team 1 of Yau Tsim District's Anti Triad Bureau. He is Cheng Wai-ling's ex-husband and he adopts her son Chi-him after she dies in a traffic accident with her boyfriend John. Fung is good friends with fellow police officers Chow Ka-wing, senior inspector of Yau Tsim District's Crime Bureau, and Chan Chau, a sergeant of Tsim Sha Tsui Criminal Investigation Bureau. He is also friends with Leung Yiu-ting, a former triad leader whom he arrested while working as an undercover cop in the past. Fung later develops a relationship with and becomes the boyfriend of his subordinate Chin Nga-lai.
- Fennie Yuen as Chin Ngai-lai (錢雅麗), a sergeant of Team 1 of the Yau Tsim District Anti Triad Bureau. She is good friends with fellow police officers Jackie Wong, a staff member of the Tsim Sha Tsui Police Station and Hui Sze-wing, a uniformed police constable. She is Chow Ka-wing's ex-girlfriend and later develops a relationship with and becomes the girlfriend of her superior Cheung Kwok-fung.
- Dickson Lee as Chow Yuk-piu (趙郁標), an officer of Team 1 and Cheung Kwok-fung's subordinate.
- Chan Wing-chun as Chan Tat-fei (陳達飛), an officer of Team 1 and Cheung Kwok-fung's subordinate.
- Jerry Koo as Cheung Ka-keung (張家強), an officer of Team 1 and Cheung Kwok-fung's subordinate.
- Deno Cheung as Choi Kan (蔡勤), an officer of Team 1 and Cheung Kwok-fung's subordinate.

=== The Chow family ===
- Bowie Wu as Chow Kai-cheung (周啟章), Tong Suk-yin's husband and Chow Ka-wing's father
- Rainbow Ching as Tong Suk-yin (唐淑燕), Chow Kai-cheung's wife and Chow Ka-wing's mother.
- Nick Cheung as Chow Ka-wing (周家榮), Senior Inspector of Yau Tsim District's Crime Bureau and the son of Chow Kai-cheung and Tong Suk-yin, He is good friends with fellow police officers Cheung Kwok-fung and Chan Chau and the ex-boyfriend of Chin Nga-lai.

=== The Chan family ===
- Lai Huen as Yeung Nin (楊年), Chan Chau's mother.
- Benz Hui as Chan Chau (陳秋), Sergeant of Tsim Sha Tsui Criminal Investigation Bureau and Yeung Nin's son. He was an old classmate and ex-boyfriend of fellow police officer Liu Sau-chu, Chief Inspector of Tsim Sha Tsui Police Emergency Unit, and also good friends with fellow police officers Cheung Kwok-fung and Chow Ka-wing. Chau often bickers with Chu Yuen-yan but later develops feelings for her.
- Camy Ding as Chan Chun (陳春), Chau's younger sister.
- Wong Fung-king as Chan Ha (陳夏), Chau and Chun's younger sister.
- Shally Tsang as Chan Tung (陳冬), Chau, Chun and Ha's younger sister.

=== The Fong family ===
- Kwok Tak-sun as Fong Lik-sang (方力生), Liu Sau-chu's husband and Fong Yuk-ying's father
- Lo Koon-lan as Liu Sau-chu (廖秀珠), Chief Inspector of Tsim Sha Tsui Police Emergency Unit. She is the wife of Fong Lik-sang and mother of Fong Yuk-ying. Chu was the old classmate and ex-girlfriend of fellow police officer Chan Chau.
- Karen Lee as Fong Yuk-ying (方玉縈), Fong Lik-sang and Liu Sau-chu's daughter.

=== The Leung family ===
- Felix Lok as Leung Yiu-ting (梁耀庭), a triad leader who was arrested by Cheung Kwok-fung during the latter's undercover mission. He befriends Fung after he is released from prison.
- Alice Lau as Ma Wai-lan (馬慧蘭), a bar owner who is Leung Yiu-ting's wife and a good friend of Cheung Kwok-fung.

=== Police ===
- Andy Tai as Lam Kong (林剛), Deputy Commander of Yau Tsim District
- Halina Tam as Jackie Wong (汪靜兒), a staff member the Tsim Sha Tsui Police Station and good friends with fellow police officers Chin Ngai-lai and Hui Sze-wing. She is also the girlfriend of uniformed police constable Lee Wai-ming.
- Hawick Lau as Lee Wai-ming (李偉明), a uniformed police constable who is Jackie Wong's boyfriend and good friends with Hui Sze-wing as Chiu Chi-ho.
- Natalie Ng as Hui Sze-wing (許思詠), a uniformed police constable who is Chiu Chi-ho's girlfriend and good friends with Chin Nga-lai, Jackie Wong and Lee Wai-ming.
- Micky Chu as Chiu Chi-ho (趙志豪), a uniformed police constable who is later promoted to sergeant, and promoted to inspector in the end. He is Hui Sze-wing's boyfriend and Lee Wai-ming's good friend.

=== Other cast ===
- Joe Ma as John, Cheng Wai-ling's boyfriend and Cheung Chi-him's father. He dies with his girlfriend in a traffic accident.
- Sonija Kwok as Cheng Wai-ing (鄭蕙玲), Cheung Kwok-fung's ex-wife and Cheung Chi-him's mother. She dies in a traffic accident with her boyfriend John.
- Chan King-kwan as Cheung Chi-him (張子謙), the orphaned son of John and Cheng Wai-ling who is adopted by Cheung Kwok-fung after the death of his parents.
- Celine Ma as Chu Yuen-yan (朱婉茵), Chan Chau's bickering rival turned girlfriend.
- Wilson Tsui as Mad Chiu (喪超), a vulgar triad member.
- Yu Chi-ming as Yeung Wing-cheung (楊永祥), a triad leader who died from a car crash.
- Lee Wai-kei as Sai-hing (細興), a triad leader and Leung Yiu-ting's former underling.
- Gregory Charles Rivers as Lee King-sam (李景琛)
- Tai Siu-man as Leung Tung (梁東)
- Russell Cheung as Peter
