= Life Made Simple =

Luyện tập trở nên hoàn hảo

- Official poster
- 阿旺新傳
- Genre: Modern Comedy-Drama
- Starring: Roger Kwok; Jessica Hsuan; Bosco Wong; Leila Tong; Raymond Cho; Angelina Lo; Benz Hui; Paul Chun; Angela Tong
- Opening theme: "十萬個為什麼" by Roger Kwok & Jessica Hsuan
- Ending theme: "軟糖" by Roger Kwok & Jessica Hsuan
- Country of origin: Hong Kong
- Original language: Cantonese
- No. of episodes: 32

Production
- Running time: 45 minutes (approx.)

Original release
- Network: TVB
- Release: October 24 – December 6, 2005

Related
- Square Pegs (2003)

Life Made Simple (Traditional Chinese: 阿旺新傳) is a TVB modern drama series broadcast in October 2005. The series is shown to celebrate TVB's 38th Anniversary.

The series is an indirect sequel to 2002's Square Pegs (戇夫成龍). The main cast features Roger Kwok, Jessica Hsuan, and Leila Tong, returning from the original series, and the new cast includes Bosco Wong and Paul Chun. The indirect sequel takes place in the modern era instead of the ancient setting of its prequel.

== Synopsis ==
The modern version of Ah Wong,
Steps out of his simple world.

Ding Sheung-Wong (Roger Kwok) is a man in his thirties but with an IQ of a seven-year-old. People would make fun of him by calling him crazy, but he would tell them that he is just simple. His best friend Wong Kei-Fung (Jessica Hsuan), who was friends with him since they were young, used to play a game where he was the husband and she was the wife; hence, this is why Wong refers to Fung as his "little wife". One day Fung told Wong that she would have to leave for the United States for four years of college.

When Fung returns to Hong Kong, she finds a job at the Chung (鍾) Corporation where she works under the management of Chung Kam-Wing (Paul Chun) and his son Michael Chung Chi-Chung (Bosco Wong). Later Kam-Wing finds out that Wong is his biological son and recruits him to his company, as well. Angel On Kei (Leila Tong), Fung's cousin, who returned with Fung from the States has a crush on Chi-Chung. But Chi-Chung has a crush on Fung. Fung feels that Wong is the one that can make her truly happy but is puzzled whether to choose Chi-Chung or Wong...

== Cast ==
=== Main cast ===
Cast	Role	Description
Roger Kwok	Ding Sheung-Wong (Ah Wong) 丁常旺	Age 30; Ding Sau-Lin and Chung Kam-Wing's simple-minded son. Wong Kei-Fung husband. Chung Chi-Chung's half-brother.
Jessica Hsuan	Wong Kei-Fung (Catherine) 黃奇鳳	Ding Sheung-Wong wife. Chung Chi-Chung's ex-girlfriend. On Kei's cousin.
Angelina Lo (盧宛茵)	Ding Sau-Lin 丁秀蓮	Ding Sheung-Wong's mother. Chung Kam-Wing's ex-wife. Tong Fuk-Shui wife.
Paul Chun	Chung Kam-Wing 鍾錦榮	Chung (鍾) Corporation CEO; Ding Sheung-Wong and Chung Chi-Chung's father. Ding Sau-Lin's ex-husband. Sung Mei-Lun's husband.
Leila Tong	On Kei (Angel) 安琪	Wong Kei-Fung's cousin. Chung Chi-Chung wife.
Bosco Wong	Chung Chi-Chung (Michael) 鍾子聰	Chung (鍾) Corporation Manager; Ding Sheung-Wong's half-brother. Wong Kei-Fung's ex-boyfriend. On Kei's husband. Chung Kam-Wing and Sung Mei-Lun's son.
Raymond Cho	Lok Kui-Shing 洛渠成	Chung Chi-Chung's friend, and Wong Kei-Fung's Lover
Benz Hui	Tong Fuk-Shui 唐福瑞	Dessert Cafe Owner; Ding Sau-Lin's husband. Ding Sheung Wong stepfather.
Angela Tong	Li Siu-Ho 李笑好	Dessert Cafe Dishwasher; Ding Sheung-Wong's friend. Lam Bun's lover.

=== Other cast ===
Cast	Role	Description
Law Koon Lan (羅冠蘭)	Ho Lai-Sa 何麗莎	Wong Siu-Lung's wife. Wong Kei-Fung's mother.
Chun Wong (秦煌)	Wong Siu-Lung 黃小龍	Bus Driver; Ho Lai-Sa's husband. Wong Kei Fung's father.
Samuel Kwok (郭鋒)	Li Wai 李威	Li Siu-Ho's father.
Li Ka Sing (李家聲)	Lam Bun 林賓	Dessert Cafe Clerk; Li Siu-Ho's lover.
Rebecca Chan	Sung Mei-Lun (Helen) 宋美綸	Chung Kam-Wing's wife. Chung Chi-Chung's mother.
Savio Tsang	Sung Chi-Woon (Charles) 宋智煥	Sung Mei-Lun's younger brother.
Selena Li	Yeung Yuen-Kwan (Joanna) 楊婉君	Childhood friend of Ah Wong and Catherine.

== Awards and nominations ==
- Roger Kwok won his second "Best Actor in a Leading Role" Award for his role Ding Sheung-Wong, at the 38th TVB Anniversary Awards in 2005.
- Angela Tong won the "Best Actress in a Supporting Role" Award for her role Li Siu-Ho, at the 38th TVB Anniversary Awards in 2005.

== Viewership ratings ==
	Week	Episode	Average Points	Peaking Points	References
1	October 24–28, 2005	1 — 5	30	—	
2	October 31 - November 4, 2005	6 — 10	32	34	
3	November 7–11, 2005	11 — 15	33	37	
4	November 14–18, 2005	16 — 20	34	36	
5	November 21–25, 2005	21 — 25	34	37	
6	November 28 - December 2, 2005	26 — 30	34	37	
7	December 5–6, 2005	31 — 32	41	43	
