= Natalie Tong =

Hong Kong actress and model

- 唐詩詠
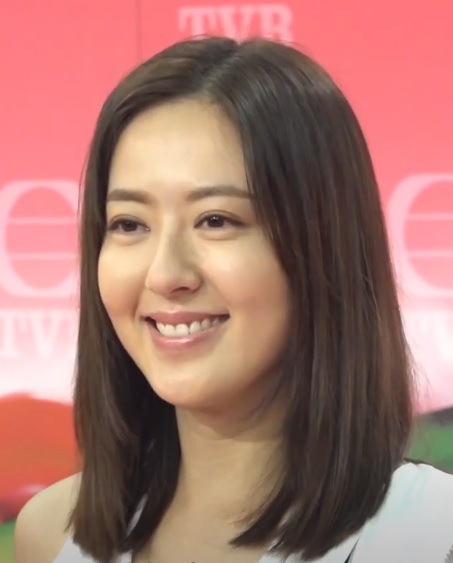
- Tong in May 2020
- Born: British Hong Kong
- Occupations: Actress; model; entrepreneur
- Years active: 2000–present
- Notable work: My Unfair Lady; Big White Duel series
- Awards: Next TV Awards for Top 10 Artist; 2011 No. 10 TVB Anniversary Awards – Most Improved Female Artiste; 2010 A Watchdog's Tale; A Fistful of Stances; The Comeback Clan; Best Actress; 2017 My Unfair Lady StarHub Night of Star – Best TVB Female Artiste; 2019 Big White Duel

Chinese name
- Traditional Chinese: 唐詩詠
- Simplified Chinese: 唐诗咏
- Hanyu Pinyin: Táng Shīyǒng
- Jyutping: tong4 si1 wing6

Birth name
- Chinese: 唐思盈
- Hanyu Pinyin: Táng Sīyíng
- Jyutping: tong4 si1 jing4

Natalie Tong Sze-wing (Chinese: 唐詩詠) is a Hong Kong actress, model, entrepreneur, and theatre performer previously contracted to TVB. She has appeared in numerous television dramas, films, and stage productions over her career spanning more than two decades.

== Life and career ==
=== 1982–1999: Early days ===
Tong (originally Tong Si-ying) was born in British Hong Kong to an Indonesian Chinese mother, Tong Got Seung-ping. She grew up in Hong Kong-Cantonese culture and has a mixed ancestry of Fujianese, Indonesian, and Dutch heritage.

=== 2000–2002: RTHK and film debut ===
Tong entered the entertainment industry via RTHK, debuting in Youth @ Y2K (2000), where she met and briefly dated co-star Shawn Yue. She made her film debut shortly after with minor roles in Hong Kong cinema.

=== 2003–2022: TVB career and departure ===
Tong joined TVB in 2003 and became a prolific television actress. Her early work included supporting and lead roles in series such as Hearts of Fencing, Just Love, Under the Canopy of Love, A Watchdog's Tale, and The Comeback Clan. In 2017, she received critical acclaim and won the TVB Anniversary Award for Best Actress for her role in My Unfair Lady. In 2019, she starred in Big White Duel, earning nominations for Best Actress and Most Popular Female Character at the TVB Anniversary Awards.

By 2022, Tong decided not to renew her TVB contract due to declining opportunities and industry changes. After 19 years with the company, Natalie officially left TVB in September 2022.

=== 2023–present: Independent projects and entrepreneurship ===
After leaving TVB, Tong declared that she was shifting her career to stage plays and becoming a screenwriter. She developed a story inspired by her personal life. The play focuses on a couple's divorce and the daughter's experiences, drawing from Tong's own experiences.

In addition, Tong co‑opened a Japanese‑style bakery in Causeway Bay, which has become popular and draws customers daily. She has been hands‑on in the business and shared her baking journey on social media. Tong also travelled for culinary learning and promotional appearances. However, the bakery's success was short-lived as now it's in decline, with customers citing pricing as an issue.

She also filmed travel segments for HOY TV and participated in other variety content after her TVB departure. In 2025, she made her stage debut in the play Yerma (妻迷).

== Filmography ==
=== Television series ===
Year	Title	Role	Episodes	Notes
2000	Youth @ Y2K	Supporting	8	RTHK debut
2003	Hearts of Fencing	Ko Ching	11	TVB
2004	Sunshine Heartbeat	Ko Ching	13	TVB
2005	Just Love	Kot Bo-yee	20	TVB
2005	Yummy Yummy	Chan Ka-no	30	TVB
2005	Love Bond	Lam Siu-wu	30	TVB
2006	Forensic Heroes	Mon Chiu Suet-man	25	TVB
2006	Under the Canopy of Love	Coco Ko Yat-ching	20	TVB
2007	The Green Grass of Home	Yung Wai-yu	20	TVB
2007	The Ultimate Crime Fighter	Ngai Sze-ka	37	TVB
2007	The Building Blocks of Life	Veronica Kwong On-kiu	20	TVB
2008	The Seventh Day	Sasa Wong Chi-kwan	20	TVB main role
2009	Just Love II	Bowie Kot Bo-yer	25	TVB
2010	A Fistful of Stances	Ying Ngan-ming	25	TVB main role
2010	A Watchdog's Tale	Chou Ka-man	20	TVB
2010	The Comeback Clan	Tai Ying-lei	20	TVB main role
2011	Only You	Ma Hiu-ching	29	TVB
2011	The Other Truth	Cecilia Pun Hau-yu	25	TVB
2017	My Unfair Lady	Cherry	20	TVB lead role; won Best Actress
2019	Big White Duel	Zoe	30	TVB lead role
2020	Big White Duel II	Zoe	30	TVB lead role

=== Films ===
Year	Title	Role	Notes
2000	A War Named Desire	Supporting	Feature film debut
2002	Ghost of Tse Family	Supporting	
2004	Fantasia	Supporting	
2005	The Shopaholics	Supporting	
2007	The Hospital	Supporting	
2009	72 Tenants of Prosperity	Supporting	
2011	I Love Hong Kong 2011	Supporting	
2012	Lan Kwai Fong 2	Supporting	
2013	Vulgaria	Supporting	
2014	Golden Chicken 3	Supporting	
2015	Buddy Cops	Supporting	
2017	The Brink	Supporting	

== Awards and nominations ==
Year	Award	Category	Work	Result
2010	TVB Anniversary Awards	Most Improved Female Artiste	A Watchdog's Tale / A Fistful of Stances / The Comeback Clan	Won
2011	Next TV Awards	Top 10 Artist	–	No. 10
2017	TVB Anniversary Awards	Best Actress	My Unfair Lady	Won
2019	StarHub Night of Stars	Best TVB Female Artiste	Big White Duel	Won
