= Roger Kwok =

Hong Kong actor

- 郭晋安
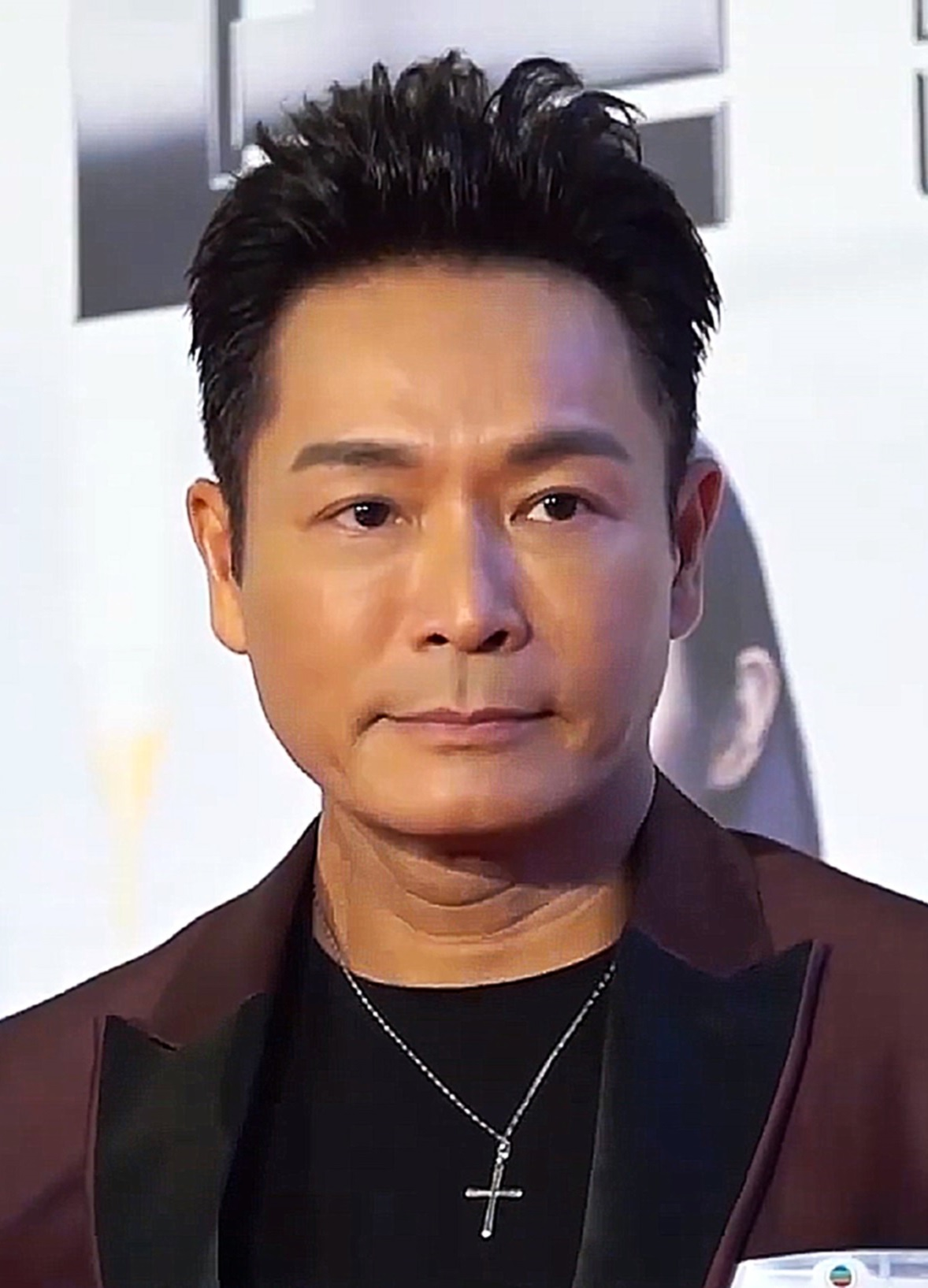
- Kwok in 2019
- Born: Kwok Ah-on; October 9, 1964 (age 62); Cheung Chau, British Hong Kong
- Occupations: Actor; singer
- Years active: 1986–present
- Notable work: Square Pegs; Life Made Simple; Black Heart White Soul; Big White Duel series
- Spouse: Cindy Au (m. 2006-2024)
- Children: 2
- Awards: TVB Anniversary Awards – Best Actor; 2003 Square Pegs; 2005 Life Made Simple; 2014 Black Heart White Soul TVB Star Awards Malaysia – Favourite TVB Actor; 2004 Square Pegs; 2007 Life Made Simple; 2014 Black Heart White Soul

Chinese name
- Traditional Chinese: 郭晉安
- Simplified Chinese: 郭晋安
Transcriptions
Standard Mandarin
- Hanyu Pinyin: Guō Jǐnán
Yue: Cantonese
- Yale Romanization: Gwok Jeunōn
- Jyutping: Gwok3 Zeon3on1

Roger Kwok Chun-on (Chinese: 郭晋安) real name Kwok Ah-on (Chinese: 郭亞安), is a Hong Kong television actor and former singer, former works for the TV station TVB. Kwok was born in Hong Kong, and his native family roots are in Zhongshan, Guangdong. He is one of the three actors who won Best Actor three times at the TVB Anniversary Awards.

== Career ==
Roger Kwok has worked for TVB for many years, and received moderate fame in dramas such as Detective Investigation Files IV (1999), At the Threshold of an Era (1999-2000) and Law Enforcers (2002), but it was not until he played the role of the low-IQ Ding Sheung Wong (丁常旺) in the hugely popular drama Square Pegs (2002-2003) did he reach stardom, and went on to win Best Actor at the 2003 TVB Anniversary Awards.

After appearing in the moderately popular dramas Not Just a Pretty Face (美麗在望) (2003) and To Get Unstuck in Time (2004), Kwok reprised his role as Wong in the modernized version of Square Pegs, Life Made Simple, in 2005, which again was a huge success. In November 2005, Kwok won Best Actor for the second time. In 2008, he received rave reviews for his villainous role as Tong Lap Yin in Last One Standing, a role which left many viewers in shock over his transformation from good to evil. In December 2014, Kwok won his third Best Actor Award for another villainous role, this time as the barrister "Matt" Ko Chit Hang in the drama Black Heart White Soul. He has since matched Gallen Lo and Wayne Lai's record of winning 3 Best Actor awards.

== Personal life ==
Kwok has five older brothers and three younger sisters.

On 22 July 2006, Kwok married Hong Kong actress Cindy Au, his girlfriend of seven years, at Hong Kong Disneyland. Their son, Brad Kwok Ling-shan, was born on 23 March 2008. Their second child, daughter Blair Kwok Yee-nga, was born on 29 June 2011. Kwok and Au divorced in May 2024.

== Filmography ==
=== Television dramas ===
Year	Title	Role	Notes/Ref.
1986	City Story	Leung Wai-kwong	
1988	The New Matchmaker		Cameo
1988	The Final Verdict	Tse Ping-on	
1988	Behind Silk Curtains		Cameo
1988	The Saga of the Lost Kingdom	Ying Dan	
1989	The Vixen's Tale	Man Man-tung	
1989	I Do, I Do	Sai Cheong	
1989	Lin Shing Kuet	Tik Wan	based on the Jin Yong novel A Deadly Secret
1989	The War Heroes	Ling Wan-fei	
1990	Being Rich	Hoh San-nin	
1990	Rain in the Heart	Lau Kar-wai	
1990	When the Sun Shines	Tin Kai-on	
1991	Mystery of the Twin Swords	Day	
1992	Road for the Heroes	Dumpling	
1992	Mystery of the Twin Swords II	Day	
1992	The Stake	Chow Chi-wah	
1993	Top Cop	Chan Yat-yin	
1994	ICAC Investigators 1994	Yiu Cheong-wah	
1994	The Intangible Truth	Ma Hoi	
1994	Sailor Moon	Mamoru Chiba/Tuxedo Mask	Cantonese voice-over
1994	Instinct	Poon Long-ching	
1995	When A Man Loves A Woman	Leung Lap-man	
1995	Fatal Assignment		Television film
1996	Money Just Can't Buy	Yeung Sai-chau	
1996	New Dragon Gate Inn	Zhu Youjian	
1997	Qian Qiu Ying Lie Zhaun	Guan Wuguo	
1997	Sun Zi Bing : Wu Di Jun Shi	Wu Zixu	
1997	Beijing Hong Kong Love Connection	Li Dongming	
1997	Yan Ye	Chiu Tai-sing	
1997	Shen Ai Zhe Ni	Chen Wenda	
1998	Rural Hero	Wong On-shun	
1999	Happy Ever After	Suen Min-leung	
1999	Detective Investigation Files IV	Cheng Tung-sing	'The Price of Love' (Episodes 48-50)
1999	A Smiling Ghost Story	Koo Tak-ming	
1999	At the Threshold of an Era	Ma Chi-keung	
2000	At the Threshold of an Era II	Ma Chi-keung	
2000	Lotus Lantern	Liu Yanchang / Liu Yong	
2001	Legendary Fighter: Yang's Heroine	Yang Yanlang (Yang Silang)	
2001	Law Enforcers	Cheung Kwok-fung	1st Male Lead
2002	Crepe Queen	Qin Jian	
2002	A Herbalist Affair	Cheung Yee-fai	1st Male Lead
2002	Legend of Heaven and Earth: The Mermaid	Zhang Ziyou	
2002	The Trust of a Lifetime	Chow Yiu-cho	
2002–03	Square Pegs	Ting Sheung-wong	TVB Anniversary Award for Best Actor; TVB Anniversary Award for My Favourite On-screen Partners (Drama) (shared with Jessica Hsuan); TVB Anniversary Award for My Favourite TV Characters; Astro Drama Award for My Favourite Leading Actor; Astro Drama Award for Most Unforgettable Scene (shared with Jessica Hsuan); Astro Drama Award for My Favourite Characters; Power Academy Award for Outstanding Actor in Television
2003	The 'W' Files	Yeung Lap-kwan	Episode: "Searching Dreams"
2003	Not Just A Pretty Face	Leonardo Guo Siu-chit	Nominated — TVB Anniversary Award for My Favourite On-screen Partners (Drama) (with Joey Yung)
2004	Sha Wang Chuang Tian Xia	Jing Hao	
2004	To Get Unstuck In Time	SIP Ho Tin-kwong (Morning Sir)	TVB Anniversary Award for My Favourite TV Characters; Astro Drama Award for My Favourite TV Characters; Nominated — TVB Anniversary Award for Best Actor; Nominated — Astro Drama Award for My Favourite Leading Actor
2004	The Royal Swordsmen	"Yellow's #1" Cheng Shifei	
2005	Scavengers' Paradise	'Tang Wai-cheung	Astro Drama Award for My Favourite Characters; Nominated — Astro Drama Award for My Favourite Bizarre Appearance
2005	Life Made Simple	Ting Sheung-wong	TVB Anniversary Award for Best Actor; Astro Wah Lai Toi Drama Award for My Favourite Leading Actor; Astro Wah Lai Toi Drama Award for My Favourite Characters; Power Academy Award for Outstanding Actor in Television; Nominated — Astro Drama Award for My Favourite Couple (with Jessica Hsuan); Nominated — Astro Wah Lai Toi Drama Award for My Favourite Bizarre Appearance; Nominated — Astro Drama Award for Most Unforgettable Scene
2005	Love In Mulberry	Chen Fugui	
2006	Fairy of the Chalice	Zheng Feng	
2006	Greed Mask	'Sam Ko Fung	
2006	Glittering Days	Law Daai-dai	Nominated — Astro Drama Award for My Favourite Bizarre Appearance
2008	D.I.E.	SGT Yu Tsz-long	Nominated — TVB Anniversary Award for Best Actor
2008	Last One Standing	Tong Lap-yin	
2008	8 Avatar	Han Xiang Zi	
2009	The Threshold of a Persona	Fong Chun-kit	
2009	D.I.E. Again	SGT Yu Tsz-long	
2010	The Season of Fate	Ma Wing-ching / Ma On-shan	
2010	Little Miss Unreasonable	Qin Shaoyou	
2010–11	Show Me the Happy	Dr. Andy Chai Cheung	Sitcom regular
2011	Wax and Wane	Eugene Yung Yee-tsun	
2012	Queens of Diamonds and Hearts	Tin Pik-keung, King Suen of Chai	
2012	Happy Marshal	Tai Bai Jin Xing	
2012	Justice, My Foot	Song Shijie	
2013	Inbound Troubles	Ng Ka-yee	
2013	Awfully Lawful	Solo Lo	
2013-14	Return of the Silver Tongue	Cheung Sei-wai	
2014	Black Heart White Soul	Matt Ko Chit-hang	TVB Anniversary Award for Best Actor; TVB Star Award Malaysia for Favourite Actor; TVB Star Award Malaysia for Favourite Drama Characters
2014	Come On, Cousin	Lam Choi-yea	
2016	The Last Healer in Forbidden City	To Chung	
2016	Dead Wrong	Vincent Wai Yat-sing	Nominated — TVB Anniversary Award for Best Actor
2017	Oh My Grad	To Ming-chi	
2018	Another Era	Leo Ho Tin-sang	
2019	Big White Duel	Dr. "YT" Yeung Yat-to	Nominated — TVB Anniversary Award for Best Actor; Nominated — TVB Anniversary Award for Most Popular Onscreen Partnership (with Kenneth Ma)
2019	Once Upon a Time in Lingjian Mountain	Feng Yin	
2021	The Forgotten Day	Ng Yiu-chong	Nominated — TVB Anniversary Award for Best Actor; Nominated — TVB Anniversary Award for Most Popular Male Character (Top 10); Nominated — TVB Anniversary Award for Most Popular Onscreen Partnership (with Shaun Tam); Nominated — TVB Anniversary Award for Favourite TVB Actor in Malaysia
2021	Flying Tiger 3	To Man-bun	
2022	Communion	Au Yiu-cho	Nominated — TVB Anniversary Award for Best Actor (Top 10); Nominated — TVB Anniversary Award for Most Popular Male Character; Nominated — TVB Anniversary Award for Favourite TVB Actor in Malaysia; Nominated — TVB Anniversary Award for Most Popular Onscreen Partnership (with Alice Chan)
2022	Big White Duel II	Dr. "YT" Yeung Yat-to	Nominated — TVB Anniversary Award for Best Actor; Nominated — TVB Anniversary Award for Most Popular Male Character; Nominated — TVB Anniversary Award for Favourite TVB Actor in Malaysia; Nominated — TVB Anniversary Award for Most Popular Onscreen Partnership (with Kelly Cheung)
2025	The Fading Gold	Fong Yeung-tin	

=== Films ===
Year	Film	Role	Notes
1990	Mountain Warriors		
1991	Happy Ghost V	Kit	
1991	Twin Bracelets	Kuang	
1992	A Moment of Romance II	Jack	
1992	Dead End		Television film
1992	Edge of Justice		Television film
1992	Thief of Time	Emperor Por Yee	Television film
1994	Wonder Seven	Iron Rod	
1994	Once Upon a Time in China V	So Sai-man ("Bucktooth" So)	
1995	Shaolin Kung Fu Kids	Brother Ng	
2002	Visible Secret 2	Paul	
2005	Kung Fu Mahjong	Wong	
2007	Kung Fu Mahjong 3: The Final Duel	Ken Man Kam-yau	
2007	Dragon Treasure	Mang Fei (Flying Eagle)	
2008	The Vampire Who Admires Me and You	Wayne Sa	
2019	I Love You, You're Perfect, Now Change!		
2019	Bodies at Rest		
2019	Little Q		

Awards and achievements
TVB Anniversary Awards
Preceded by Gallen Lo for Golden Faith	Best Actor; 2003 for Square Pegs	Succeeded by Bowie Lam for War and Beauty
TVB Anniversary Awards
Preceded by Bowie Lam for War and Beauty	Best Actor; 2005 for Life Made Simple	Succeeded by Kevin Cheng for Under the Canopy of Love
TVB Anniversary Awards
Preceded by Dayo Wong for Bounty Lady	Best Actor; 2014 for Black Heart White Soul	Succeeded by Now
