= Jessica Hsuan =

Hong Kong actress (born 1970)

- Hsuan in 2021
- Born: 18 August 1970 (age 56); British Hong Kong
- Other name: Suen Huen
- Citizenship: Chinese (Hong Kong)
- Education: Imperial College London (BSc)
- Occupation: Actress
- Years active: 1993–present
- Awards: Full list

Chinese name
- Chinese: 宣萱
- Hanyu Pinyin: Xuān Xuān
- Jyutping: Syun1 Hyun1

Jessica Hester Hsuan (Chinese: 宣萱; Jyutping: Syun1 Hyun1; born 18 August 1970), also known as Suen Huen, is a Hong Kong actress.

== Early life ==
Hsuan's father gave her the name Jessica, while her mother gave her the middle name Hester. She was educated in Hong Kong at Maryknoll Convent School for primary education and at Pooi To Middle School. She later boarded at Roedean School in Britain.

Hsuan graduated with a bachelor's degree in materials science and engineering from Imperial College London in 1992.

== Career ==
Hsuan started her career in late 1992 and early 1993. Along with Maggie Cheung Ho Yee, Ada Choi, Flora Chan and Kenix Kwok, she was known as one of the top five "Fa Dans" (a term borrowed from Peking Opera for roles depicting young maidens, and used for actresses with high popularity) of TVB from the mid-1990s to mid-2000s. She has collaborated with many TVB leading actors including Louis Koo, Wong He, Chilam Cheung, Nick Cheung, Gallen Lo, Roger Kwok, Sunny Chan, Joe Ma and Bobby Au-yeung. She won the 1999 TVB Anniversary Award for Best Actress for her role in Detective Investigation Files IV.

She changed her contract to a "per-series" in late 2006, after it was disclosed that she had not renewed her current contract.

In 2017, Hsuan played a leading role in TVB series My Unfair Lady (Chinese: 不懂撒嬌的女人). She won the My Favorite TVB Actress (also known as Malaysia's TV Queen) at the TVB Star Awards in Malaysia in 2017 for her performance in this series, her first leading actress award since 1999.

Louis Koo's film production company, One Cool Film Production, was able to acquire the rights of the series A Step into the Past in 2015 and adapt to the big screen - Back to the Past. Production for the film officially wrapped on 7 July 2019. Hsuan will play a role in the movie.

Hsuan also played the role of Leslie Lam in Hong Kong Disneyland's theme ride Ant-Man and The Wasp: Nano Battle!.

=== Frequently acting as hostage in television series and films ===
Among the TV drama and films Hsuan starred in, she was frequently "kidnapped" in the stories. This has drawn the attention of internet users in Hong Kong. Occasionally she was known as the "Queen of hostage" (人質王). Nevertheless, she always survived in the end.

== Awards and nominations ==
Hsuan is one of the most honored actresses in Hong Kong, with 13 Best Actress awards.

Year	Organisation	Category	Nominated work	Result	Ref.
1995	Next Magazine TV Award	Top 10 Artists	—N/a	8th	
1999	TVB Anniversary Awards	Best Actress In A Leading Role	Detective Investigation Files IV (as Quin Mo Chiu Kwan)	Won	
2000	TVB Anniversary Awards	My Top 10 Favorite Television Characters	A Matter of Customs (as Moon Fung Moon-fan)	8th	
2000	Next Magazine TV Award	Top 10 Artists	—N/a	2nd	
2001	TVB Anniversary Awards	My Top 13 Favorite Television Characters	A Step into the Past (as Wu Ting-fong)	9th	
2002	TVB Anniversary Awards	My Top 12 Favorite Television Characters	Golden Faith (as Rachel Ching)	2nd	
2002	Next Magazine TV Award	Top 10 Artists	—N/a	2nd	
2025	Star Awards	Best Actress	Kill Sera Sera (as Shao Ruoyun)	Won	
2025	Star Awards	Top 10 Most Popular Female Artistes	—N/a	Nominated	

- 2003: TVB 36th Anniversary: My Favorite On-Screen Partners (Jessica Hsuan & Roger Kwok - Square Pegs)
- 2003: TVB 36th Anniversary: My Top 12 Favorite Television Characters - Ranked #5 (Square Pegs)
- 2003: Next Magazine TV Award: Top 10 Artists - Ranked #1
- 2004: TVB 37th Anniversary: My Top 12 Favorite Television Characters - Ranked #1 (Lady Fan)
- 2005: Next Magazine TV Award: Top 10 Artists - Ranked #3
- 2005: Next Magazine TV Award: Most Elegant Artiste Award
- 2006: Next Magazine TV Award: Top 10 Artists - Ranked #2
- 2006: Next Magazine TV Award: Most Feminine Beautiful Award
- 2007: Asian Television Award: Best Comedy Performance by an Actress (Nominated)
- 2008: I Weekly Magazine Awards Top 10 Female Artists - Ranked #1
- 2008: Next Magazine TV Award: Top 10 Artists - Ranked #2
- 2008: Sina Awards: Best Style Actress
- 2008: Astro Wah Lai Toi Drama Awards 2008: My Favorite Character - Ranked #6 (Dicey Business)
- 2015: 7th Macau International Movie Festival: Golden Lotus Award for Best Supporting Actress (The Kid from the Big Apple)
- 2017: TVB Star Awards Malaysia: My Favorite TVB Actress in a Leading Role (My Unfair Lady)
- 2017: People's Choice Television Awards: People's Choice Best Actress (My Unfair Lady)
- 2017: Hong Kong Television Awards: Best Leading Actress in Drama Series (My Unfair Lady)
- 2024: 29th Asian Television Awards: Best Leading Female Performance - Digital (Kill Sera Sera)
