= Square Pegs (Hong Kong TV series) =

- Promo poster
- 戇夫成龍
- Genre: Romance, comedy
- Written by: Leung Yun Dung (梁恩東)
- Directed by: Lau Shun On (劉順安); Lam Chi Yan (林子欣)
- Starring: Roger Kwok; Jessica Hsuan; Raymond Cho; Leila Tong; Winnie Yeung
- Opening theme: "Brave Love (愛情勇敢)" by Hacken Lee & Emme Wong
- Ending theme: "軟糖" by Roger Kwok & Jessica Hsuan
- Country of origin: Hong Kong
- Original language: Cantonese
- No. of episodes: 20

Production
- Producer: Wong Wai Sing (黃偉聲)
- Running time: 45 minutes (approx.)

Original release
- Network: TVB
- Release: December 30, 2002 – January 24, 2003

Related
- Life Made Simple (2005)

Square Pegs (Traditional Chinese: 戇夫成龍) was a Hong Kong television series 2003. The program's title is an abbreviated reference to the English idiomatic phrase "square peg in a round hole."

The series was the runaway success of 2003, commanding a peak viewership of 46 points, approximately 3.5 million or roughly half of Hong Kong's population during the last week of its broadcast, and breaking TVB's ten-year ratings record. It also went on to win four awards for its two lead actors in the TVB 36th Anniversary Awards, and made both Roger Kwok and Jessica Hsuan household names in the territory.

== Synopsis ==
Choi Fong (Jessica Hsuan) is the eldest daughter of the Ling family that includes her oft-absent father, stepmother and stepsister Choi Dip (Leila Tong). Like Cinderella, she undertakes all the housework, does the grocery shopping, cooks for the family, and prevents her father's antique collection from falling prey to her stepmother's gambling appetite.

One day, Mrs. Ling's vice finally catches up with her and to pay a particular debt, Choi Dip is consigned to marry the village idiot Ding Seung Wong or Ah Wong (Roger Kwok), who has about the same intelligence as an eight-year-old child. Unwilling to commit her real daughter to a life of misery, Mrs. Ling arranges a double wedding and switches the brides so that Choi Fong ends up marrying Ah Wong, while Choi Dip marries Bao Gai Zong (Raymond Cho), the scion of the wealthy Bao family. And so begins Choi Fong's merry schemes to escape from her marriage with Ah Wong who, to her consternation, takes an immediate liking to her and clings to her like sticky biscuit dough.

After several failed attempts evading her fate, Choi Fong gradually resigns herself to play Ah Wong's "lou por jai" or "little wife". One day, a strange girl Yeung Pui Kwan (Winnie Yeung) arrives in town and claims Ah Wong for her fiancé. Choi Fong soon learns that Ah Wong was actually a bright young man and the real heir of the Bao family who inexplicably disappeared two years ago, only to reappear with an IQ of an eight-year-old.

Hoping to return Ah Wong to his rightful babysitter as soon as possible, Choi Fong agrees to help Pui Kwan get to the root of the mystery. So the girls embark on a campaign to expose the bogus Bao Gai Zong, reinstate Ah Wong as the rightful heir, and help him regain his memory. But just as Ah Wong begins to show signs of recovery, Choi Fong realises to her dismay that she has fallen for him...

== Cast ==
=== Main cast ===
Cast	Role	Description
Roger Kwok	Ding Sheung Wong (Ah Wong) 丁常旺	Bao Hing Fung's son. Ling Choi Fong's husband. Yeung Pui Kwan's fiancé.
Jessica Hsuan	Ling Choi Fung 凌彩鳳	Ding Sheung Wong's wife. Ling Choi Dip's stepsister. Ling Shun Cheung's daughter. Lau Seung Seung's stepdaughter.
Raymond Cho	Bao Gai Zong 包繼宗	Ling Choi Dip's husband.
Leila Tong	Ling Choi Dip 凌彩蝶	Bao Gai Zong's wife. Ling Choi Fong's stepsister. Lau Seung Seung's daughter. Ling Shun Cheung's stepdaughter.
Winnie Yeung	Yeung Pui Kwan 楊佩君	Ding Sheung Wong's fiancée.

=== Other cast ===
Cast	Role	Description
Hui Siu Hung	Ding Yau Lik 丁有力	Ding Sheung Wong's adoptive father. Mai Chu Lien's husband.
Angelina Lo	Mai Chu Lien 米珠蓮	Ding Sheung Wong's adoptive mother. Ding Yau Lik's wife.
Chun Wong	Ling Shun Cheung 凌順昌	Ling Choi Fong's father. Ling Choi Dip's stepfather. Lau Seung Seung's husband.
Rebecca Chan	Lau Seung Seung 柳湘湘	Ling Choi Dip's mother. Ling Choi Fong's stepmother. Ling Shun Cheung's wife.
Yuen Wah	Bao Hing Fung 包慶豐	Ding Sheung Wong's biological father. Bao Dai Fu's uncle. Bao Kam Chi's uncle.
Lee Sing Cheung	Bao Dai Fu 包大富	Bao Kam Chi's older brother. Bao Hing Fung's nephew.
Angela Tong	Bao Kam Chi 包金枝	Bao Dai Fu's younger sister. Bao Hing Fung's niece.
Natalie Wong	Ka Ying Ying 賈盈盈	Kong Wing's lover.
John Tang	Kong Wing 江榮	Ding family's helper. Ka Ying Ying's lover.

== Awards and nominations ==
- Roger Kwok won his first "Best Actor in a Leading Role" Award for his role Ding Sheung Wong, at the 36th TVB Anniversary Awards in 2003.
