= Song Shijie =

Chinese revolutionary leader (1873–1914)

Song Shijie (Chinese: 宋世傑, 1873–1914) was a Chinese revolutionary during the final years of the empire and into the early Republic of China.

Born in Datong, Shanxi province, his father Song An was a military cook. Song started studying martial arts in 1885 and eventually opened his own school. When he saw different problems of the Qing Dynasty, he helped the poor to confront corrupt officials. He was brought into court several times on account of his agitation, but always released due to his extreme popularity in Shanxi.

Song joined the Tongmenghui (Revolutionary Alliance) in 1910. After the Wuchang Uprising in 1911, he led a team of soldiers to occupy Datong, taking control of the city, although its chief military official Wang Desheng escaped. Song was elected chief general of the Datong Military Government by the revolutionaries on 1 December 1911. He joined the Kuomintang when it was formed in 1912.

With the changing political winds of the revolution, Song was placed in a difficult position and didn't support Yuan Shikai in his consolidation of power. As a result, Song was sentenced to death by Yan Xishan and executed in Datong in 1914.
