= TVB Anniversary Awards =

Hong Kong media awards

TVB Anniversary Award
- Awarded for: Excellence in television
- Country: Hong Kong
- Presented by: Television Broadcasts Limited (TVB)
- First award: 19 November 1997; 28 years ago
- Website: tvb.com

The TVB Anniversary Awards (Chinese: 萬千星輝頒獎典禮), officially known as the TVB Awards Presentation, is an annual awards ceremony honouring TVB's programming achievements in Hong Kong television; despite claims that it is the region's equivalent to the American Emmy and the Australian Logie, no other networks are allowed to enter their programmes into TVB competition, and it is awarded solely to TVB programming. Winners are awarded a copy of the golden TVB anniversary statuette, which depicts a man and a woman holding up TVB's square logo. The TVB Anniversary Awards are only one of three (four, including Asian Television Awards) TVB awards given out. The other two types of TVB awards that are given out before the anniversary awards are: TVB Star Awards Malaysia and StarHub TVB Awards (Singapore). A list of all TVB awards winners is compiled here in the TVB Awards Winners Lists.

The awards for Best Drama, Best Actor, and Best Actress in a TVB drama series were first presented in 1997 as the final act for the TVB Anniversary Gala, a star-studded event held every year on 19 November, TVB's anniversary day. Several more award categories were introduced in the following years. In 2006, the event became a separate awards ceremony, and is usually given in November or December of that year, until 2019 when it is held in January of the following year. Carol Cheng has been hosting the awards ceremony since 2006.

== Categories ==
Nominating and voting procedures have varied over the years. Winners are determined by a combination of results coming from a professional voting committee and the public. In 2023, awards titled "Most Popular" were retired and replaced with "Greater Bay Area's Favourite"; the "Most Popular Drama Theme Song" renamed "Best TV Song"; A "Most Promising Newcomer" category was established.

=== Current categories ===
- Best Drama Series (1997–1998, 2005– )
- Best Actor in a Leading Role (1997– )
- Best Actress in a Leading Role (1997– )
- Best Actor in a Supporting Role (2003– )
- Best Actress in a Supporting Role (2003– )
- Most Improved Male Artiste (1998, 2002– )
- Most Improved Female Artiste (1998, 2002– )
- Most Promising Newcomer (2023- )
- Professional Actors Award (2012–2014, 2016– )
- Lifetime Achievement Award (2001– )
- Best TV Song (2014– )
- Best Variety Show (2011– )
- Best Informative Programme (2011– )
- Best Male Host (2021- )
- Best Female Host (2021- )
- Best Dressed Male Artiste (2023- )
- Best Dressed Female Artiste (2023- )
- Greater Bay Area's Favourite TVB Drama Series (2023- )
- Greater Bay Area's Favourite TVB Actor (2023- )
- Greater Bay Area's Favourite TVB Actress (2023- )
- Greater Bay Area's Favourite TVB Variety Show and Information Program (2023- )

=== Discontinued categories ===
- Most Popular Male Character (2006–2022)
- Most Popular Female Character (2006–2022)
- Best Host (2005–2020)
- Best Special Feature (2014– )
- Most Popular On-Screen Partnership (2016– )
- Best Touching Performance – Couple (1997)
- Best Hilarious Performance – Couple (1997)
- Most Abhorrent Role (1997)
- Most Unforgettable Actors (1999)
- Most Unforgettable Actresses (1999)
- Excellence Award (1999)
- My Favourite On-Screen Partners (Dramas) (1998–2004)
- My Favourite On-Screen Partners (Non-Dramas) (1998–2004)
- My Top Favourite Television Characters (2000–2004)
- Best Overseas Drama Serial (2005–2006)
- Mainland China's Favourite TVB Actor (2007)
- Mainland China's Favourite TVB Actress (2007)
- Best Original Show (2005–2007)
- Best Promotional Trailer (2005–2007)
- Best Variety or Informative Programme (2005–2010)
- Best Performance Award (2009–2010)
- Most Admirable Programme (2005–2011)
- TVB.com Popularity Award tvb.com (2008–2011)
- Best Classic Drama Serial (2015)

== TV ratings ==
All results are derived from live viewership in Hong Kong, based on Nielsen ratings. Before 2013, audience membership was determined by CSM Media Research.

Year	Average	Peaking	Viewers
2019	28	–	1.84 million
2018	–	–	
2017	29	–	1.85 million
2016	28	31	1.79 million
2015	29	35	1.87 million
2014	31	34	1.99 million
2013	34	40	2.18 million
2012	36	41	2.30 million
2011	38	41	2.43 million
2010	38	43	2.43 million
2009	40	44	2.56 million
2008	30	33	1.91 million
2007	29	32	1.85 million
2006	36	39	2.30 million

== Award milestones ==
- Carol Cheng is the first to have won a Golden Horse Award (Best Actress, 1988), a Hong Kong Film Award (Best Actress, 1991), and a TVB Anniversary Award (Best Actress, 2000). She has been the master of ceremonies for the TVB Anniversary Awards since 2006. In 2015, Anthony Wong became the second actor to achieve this milestone with his Best Actor win for Kiu Ngo-tin in Lord of Shanghai.
- Charmaine Sheh has garnered 6 awards at TVB Anniversary Awards, more than any other individual (three wins for Best Actress and three wins for Most Popular Female Character). Sheh also holds the record for most Best Actress wins. Sheh is also known for being:
  - The first individual to be touted as the "Double TV Queen", a recognition in which an actress wins Best Actress and Most Popular Female Character in the same year. Sheh is the only actress to receive this title two times.
  - The first actress to receive two nominations in the top 5 for Most Popular Female Character in the same year (2009). In 2012, Tavia Yeung became the second actress to achieve this milestone.
- Gallen Lo is the first individual to win the same award for two consecutive years (Best Actor in 1997 and 1998).
- Sheren Tang is the first actress to win the Best Actress for two consecutive years (in 2009 and 2010).
- Bobby Au-yeung is the first TVB acting class alumnus to win Best Actor (2000).
- Moses Chan is the first actor to be touted as "Double TV King", in 2007.
- Wayne Lai is the first and only actor to have won three different awards in the same year: Best Actor, Most Popular Male Character, and tvb.com's Most Popular Artiste (2009).
- Myolie Wu is the first and only actress to have won three different awards in the same year: Best Actress, Most Popular Female Character, and Most Extraordinary Elegant Female Artiste (2011).
- Tavia Yeung is the first and only individual who have won awards in four different categories: Most Improved Female Artiste (2003), Best Supporting Actress (2008), Most Popular Female Character (2009), and Best Actress (2012).
- Sheren Tang is the first individual from TVB acting class alumnus to win Best Actress (2009), followed by Tavia Yeung (2012) and Nancy Wu (2015).
- Mayanne Mak became the first Canada-born Master of Ceremonies to win Best MC Award (2023), and has taken over from Carol Cheng (left TVB in 2022) as a Golden MC, with Cantonese being her second language. Carol was born in Hong Kong but holds Canadian citizenship.

== Record holders ==
=== Most awards won by a drama series ===
  - War and Beauty won 9 awards in 2004, including:
    - My Favourite Actor in a Leading Role (Bowie Lam)
    - My Favourite Actress in a Leading Role (Gigi Lai)
    - My Favourite Powerhouse Actor (Chan Hung-lit)
    - My Favourite Powerhouse Actress (Sheren Tang)
    - My Top 12 Favourite TV Characters (Bowie Lam as Sun Bak-yeung)
    - My Top 12 Favourite TV Characters (Gigi Lai as Hongiya Yuk-ying)
    - My Top 12 Favourite TV Characters (Sheren Tang as Niuhuru Yu-yuet)
    - My Top 12 Favourite TV Characters (Moses Chan as Hung Mo)
    - My Top 12 Favourite TV Characters (Charmaine Sheh as Dongiya Yi-sun)
- Most awards won by a male
  - Gallen Lo and Raymond Lam (7)
- Most awards won by a female
  - Charmaine Sheh (14)

=== Acting records ===
Best Actor (TV King)

Record	Actor	Count	Years
Most awards	Gallen Lo	3	1997, 1998, 2002
Most awards	Wayne Lai	3	2009, 2010, 2012
Most awards	Roger Kwok	3	2003, 2005, 2014
Most consecutive wins	Gallen Lo	2	1997 to 1998
Most consecutive wins	Wayne Lai	2	2009 to 2010
Most nominations in top 5	Moses Chan	12	2002, 2005 to 2012, 2015, 2017, 2020
Most consecutive nominations in top 5	Moses Chan	8	2005 to 2012
Most nominations in top 5 without a win	Raymond Lam	8	2002, 2006 to 2008, 2010, 2012, 2014, 2020
Youngest winner	Louis Koo	—N/a	age 29 in 1999
Oldest winner	Ha Yu	—N/a	age 62 in 2008
Youngest nominee in top 5	Raymond Lam	—N/a	age 23 in 2002
Oldest nominee in top 5	Chung King-fai	—N/a	age 68 in 2005

- Double TV King
  - Refers to an actor who has won both Best Actor and Most Popular Male Character in a single year.
    - Moses Chan for Heart of Greed (2007)
    - Wayne Lai for Rosy Business (2009)
    - Kevin Cheng for Ghetto Justice (2011)

Best Actress (TV Queen)

Record	Actor	Count	Years
Most awards	Charmaine Sheh	3	2006, 2014, 2023
Most consecutive wins	Sheren Tang	2	2009 to 2010
Most consecutive wins	Nancy Wu	2	2015 to 2016
Most nominations in top 5	Charmaine Sheh	11	2000 to 2001, 2003 to 2004, 2006 to 2007, 2009 to 2010, 2012, 2014, 2023
Most consecutive nominations in top 5	Jessica Hsuan	7	1999 to 2005
Most nominations in top 5 without a win	Linda Chung	7	2008, 2010 to 2015
Youngest winner	Ada Choi	—N/a	age 25 in 1998
Oldest winner	Kara Wai	—N/a	age 59 in 2019
Youngest nominee in top 5	Ada Choi	—N/a	age 24 in 1997
Youngest nominee in top 5	Linda Chung	—N/a	age 24 in 2008
Oldest nominee in top 5	Liza Wang	—N/a	age 68 in 2015
Oldest nominee in top 5	Nina Paw	—N/a	age 68 in 2017

- Double TV Queen
  - Refers to an actress who has won both Best Actress and Most Popular Female Character in a single year.
    - Charmaine Sheh received this title 2 times. Once in 2006 for Maidens' Vow, and again in 2014 for Line Walker.
    - In 2011, Myolie Wu won Best Actress for Curse of the Royal Harem and Most Popular Female Character for Ghetto Justice.
    - In 2013, Kristal Tin won both awards for Brother's Keeper.
- Grand Slam
  - Refers to an actress who has won all four individual awards: Most Improved Female Artiste, Most Popular Female Character, Best Supporting Actress, and Best Actress
    - Tavia Yeung

Best Supporting Actor

Record	Actor	Count	Years
Most nominations in top 5	Paul Chun	3	2003, 2005, 2007
Most nominations in top 5	Wayne Lai	3	2005 to 2006, 2008
Most nominations in top 5	Kenneth Ma	3	2005, 2009, 2013
Most nominations in top 5	Benz Hui	3	2007, 2013 to 2014
Most nominations in top 5	Him Law	3	2008, 2012 to 2013
Most nominations in top 5	Elliot Ngok	3	2009, 2012 to 2013
Most nominations in top 5	Ngo Ka-nin	3	2009 to 2011
Youngest winner	Kalok Chow	—N/a	age 24 in 2019
Oldest winner	Benz Hui	—N/a	age 65 in 2013
Youngest nominee in top 5	Him Law	—N/a	age 24 in 2008
Youngest nominee in top 5	Kalok Chow	—N/a	age 24 in 2019
Oldest nominee in top 5	Chung King-fai	—N/a	age 69 in 2006

Best Supporting Actress

Record	Actor	Count	Years
Most awards	Fala Chen	2	2007, 2010
Most nominations in top 5	Elena Kong	5	2010, 2012 to 2015
Youngest winner	Fala Chen	—N/a	age 25 in 2007
Oldest winner	Susan Tse	—N/a	age 56 in 2009
Youngest nominee in top 5	Fala Chen	—N/a	age 25 in 2007
Oldest nominee in top 5	Lee Heung-kam	—N/a	age 76 in 2008

Most Popular Male Character

Record	Actor	Count	Years
Most awards	Kenneth Ma	4	2012, 2017, 2018, 2021
Most nominations	Raymond Lam	4	2006 to 2008, 2010, 2012, 2014
Youngest winner	Kalok Chow	age 27 in 2022	
Oldest winner	Benz Hui	age 66 in 2014	
Youngest nominee	Ricco Ng	age 21 in 2019	
Oldest nominee	Ha Yu	age 62 in 2008	

Most Popular Female Character

Record	Actor	Count	Years
Most awards	Charmaine Sheh	3	2006, 2010, 2014
Most nominations	Charmaine Sheh	6	2006 to 2010, 2012, 2014
Youngest winner	Sisley Choi	—N/a	age 26 in 2017
Oldest winner	Louise Lee	—N/a	age 58 in 2008
Youngest nominee	Linda Chung	—N/a	age 23 in 2007
Oldest nominee	Lee Heung-kam	—N/a	age 78 in 2010

Most Improved Male Artiste

Record	Actor	Age	Year
Youngest winner	Raymond Lam	23	2003
Oldest winner	Jonathan Cheung	34	2016
Youngest nominee	Raymond Lam	23	2003
Oldest nominee	Kenny Wong	43	2006

Most Improved Female Artiste

Record	Actor	Age	Year
Youngest winner	Linda Chung	22	2006
Oldest winner	Ali Lee	34	2016
Youngest nominee	Katy Kung	22	2011
Oldest nominee	Mimi Lo	36	2010

== See also ==
- List of Asian television awards
