= Yu Miu-Lin =

Chinese actress from Hong Kong

- Chinese: 余慕蓮
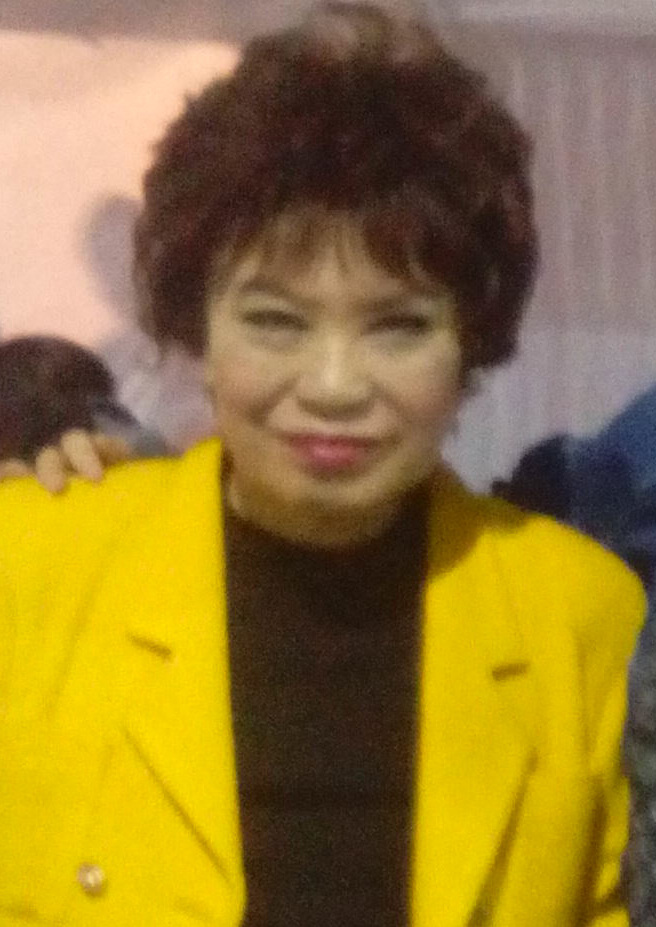
- Yu in 2015
- Born: July 4, 1937 (age 89); Canton, China
- Other names: Yu Mo-Ling, Yu Mo-Lin, M. L. Yu, Yu Mu-Lieh, Miu-lin Yu
- Occupation: Actress
- Years active: 1951–present

Yu Miu-Lin (Chinese: 余慕莲, born 4 July 1937) is a Chinese actress from Hong Kong. Yu is credited with 145 films.

== Early life ==
On 4 July 1937, Yu was born as Yu Chi-nga (Chinese: 余志雅) in Canton. Her late mother Tang Mei-mei (鄧美美) was an actress who was not widely known, and her younger sister Yu Chi-lai (stage name Koi Chi-fui) was a pupil of Cantonese Opera performer Yam Kim-fai.

== Career ==
Yu began her career as a saleswoman in a department store. She took part in the repertory theatre, and once featured in The Taming of the Shrew.

In 1950, Yu became an actress in Hong Kong films. Yu appeared in The Elderly Gentleman Searches for Romance, a 1950 Comedy film directed by Wong Hok-Sing. Yu's recent film is All's Well Ends Well 2020, a 2020 Comedy film directed by Raymond Wong Pak-Ming. Yu is credited with over 145 films.

From 1979, she began to appear in TVB series. She was often assigned roles such as a street cleaner, maid and unattractive women. Yu adopted her stage name Mo-lin after the government official yacht Lady Maurine which was in turn named after the wife of governor Sir Alexander Grantham. She is a character actress who has a talent in comical roles. Her roles and personality leave a deep impression with the audience and she does not mind to be the symbol of 'ugly woman' on TV and movies in Hong Kong.

== Filmography ==
=== Films ===
This is a partial list of films.

Year	Title	Role	Notes/Ref.
1950	The Elderly Gentleman Searches for Romance		
1981	Wedding Bells, Wedding Belles	Dental nurse	
1985	Cupid One	Fat Chan's Girlfriend	
1987	Goodbye Darling		
1987	The Romancing Star		
1988	Spooky, Spooky	Villager	
1989	Lo foo chut gaam		
1990	Happy Ghost IV		
1991	Tricky Brains		
1992	Once a Black Sheep		
1993	Ghost Lantern		
2011	I Love Hong Kong		
2011	Men Suddenly in Love		
2020	All's Well Ends Well 2020		

=== Television ===
Year	Title	Role	Notes
1978	The Wicked Aristocratic Family 《惡人世家》		
1978	Twins 《孖生姊妺》		
1979	Chor Lau-heung 《楚留香》		
1983	The Return of the Condor Heroes 《神雕俠侣》		
1984	The Return of Wong Fei Hung 《寶芝林》		
1986	Margin Treasure Prince 《孖寶太子》		
1989	Back to Tangshan 《回到唐山》		
1991	The Family Squad 《卡拉屋企》	女幫辦	
1993	A Big Green Zombies 《大頭綠衣鬥殭屍》	Lady Bao 寶夫人	
1994	The Condor Heroes Return 《射鵰英雄傳之南帝北》	QiuQianChi 裘千尺	
1995	Detective Investigation Files II 《刑事偵緝檔案II》	Chu 珠 姐	
1995	A Stage of Turbulence 《刀馬旦》	A woman wanted 通緝女子	
1995	The Trail of Love 《前世冤家》	Mui 梅	
1995	A Kindred Spirit 《真情》	Shum Sasa 沈莎莎	
1996	Journey to the West 《西遊記》	Imperial herbalist of Women's Country 女兒國御醫	
1996	Outburst 《900重案追凶》	Yuet (a nursemaid) 月 姐（宋家下人）	
1997	Time Before Time 《大鬧廣昌隆》	Soul Channeling Woman 問米婆	
1997	Untraceable Evidence 《鑑證實錄》	Sam (a nursemaid) 三 姐(馮家傭人)	
1998	Demi-Gods and Semi-Devils 《天龍八部》		
1999	Happy Ever After 《金玉滿堂》		
1999	At the Threshold of an Era 《創世紀》	Fan 芬 姐（第3集）、Kam 金 姐（第6集）	
1999	Detective Investigation Files IV 《刑事偵緝檔案IV》	Kam (a nursemaid) 金 姐(傭人)	
1999	Untraceable Evidence II 《鑑證實錄II》	Or (a nursemaid) 娥 姐(井家傭人)	
2000	War of the Genders 《男親女愛》	Unmarried woman 姑 婆	
2000	Return of the Cuckoo 《十月初五的月光》	Tong Mei Fung 唐美鳳	
2001	Country Spirit 《酒是故鄉醇》		
2001	In the Realm of Success 《公私戀事多》	Fong 芳	
2001	Virtues of Harmony 《皆大歡喜》	Miss Wong 王大妈、小芙蓉	
2002	Burning Flame II 《烈火雄心II》	Landlady 包租婆	
2002	Take My Word For It 《談判專家》	Cheuk Siu-bing 卓小冰	
2002	Square Pegs 《戇夫成龍》		
2003	Triumph In The Skies 《衝上雲霄》	Sam 三 嬸	
2003	Life Begins at Forty 《花樣中年》	Granny 阿 婆	
2003	Fate Twisters 《黑夜彩虹》	Secretary 秘 書	
2004	Lady Fan 《烽火奇遇结良缘》	Midwife 穩 婆	
2004	Hard Fate 《翡翠戀曲》	Ha 霞 姐	
2004	The Last Breakthrough 《天涯俠醫》	Kam 金 姑	
2004	To Catch the Uncatchable 《棟篤神探》	Lin 蓮 姐	
2005	Fantasy Hotel 《開心賓館》	Ying 英 姐	
2006	A Pillow Case Of Mystery 《施公奇案》	Villager 居民	
2006	Welcome to the House 《高朋滿座》	Luk 六 婆	
2006	The Dance of Passion 《火舞黃沙》	Chun-fan's mother 春分母親	
2006	Maidens' Vow 《鳳凰四重奏》		
2006	Glittering Days 《東方之珠》	Lin 蓮 姐	
2006	Land of Wealth 《滙通天下》	Mrs Cheng 鄭 嫂	
2006	Trimming Success 《飛短留長父子兵》	Ho 好 姑	
2007	A Change of Destiny 《天機算》	Mrs Kat Cheung 吉祥嫂	
2007	The Family Link 《師奶兵團》	Tong 湯 婆	
2007	Police Academy 《學警出更》	Boss of a herbal shop 涼茶鋪老闆	
2007	Heavenly In-Laws 《我外母唔係人》	Neighbour 街 坊	
2008	Legend of the Demigods 《搜神傳》	Lung 龍婆婆	
2009	Off Pedder 《畢打自己人》	Mrs Cheung 張師奶	
2010	Suspects in Love 《搜下留情》	Lui Kau Mui 雷九妹	
2010	When Lanes Merge 《情越雙白線》	Lee Sam Fung 李三鳳	
2010	Some Day 《天天天晴》	Woon 煥姐	
2014	The Borderline 《警界線》	Yu Chat-hei 俞七喜	
2015	Incredible Mama 《我阿媽係黑玫瑰》	Pak popo 白婆婆	
2015	The Menu 《導火新聞線》	Hang's mother 恆母	

== Philanthropy ==
In 2004, Yu donated 80,000 yuan for building an elementary school in Guizhou Province, China and the school is entitled Yu Mu Lian Hope School. On 22 June 2006, she acted as the ambassador of the charitable activity called "Cascc famine eight hours".

== Personal life ==
In 2020, Yu was diagnosed with a rare type of blood cancer and pulmonary fibrosis.
