= Detective Investigation Files Series =

Hong Kong TV series

Detective Investigation Files
- Original work: Detective Investigation Files (1995)
- Owner: Television Broadcasts Limited
- Years: 1995–1999

Films and television
- Television series: Detective Investigation Files (1995); Detective Investigation Files II (1995–96); Detective Investigation Files III (1997); Detective Investigation Files IV (1999)

Detective Investigation Files (Chinese: 刑事偵緝檔案) is a TV series in Hong Kong about detectives, produced by TVB. The series had four installments, spanning from 1995 to 1999.

== Cast ==
The first (1995), second (1995), and third (1997) installments starring:

- Michael Tao Dai Yu
- Joey Leung Wing Chung
- Kenix Kwok Ho Ying
- Louisa So Yuk Wah

The fourth installment (1999) is a complete reboot of the series, with new cast led by:

- Louis Koo Tin Lok
- Sunny Chan Kam Hung
- Jessica Hester Hsuan
- Charmaine Sheh Shi Man
- Lee San San

== Availability ==
The VCDs of Detective Investigation Files I - IV are now available worldwide.
