= Web of Love =

Hong Kong television series

- Official poster
- 網上有情人
- Genre: Modern Drama, Romance, Comedy
- Created by: Hong Kong Television Broadcasts Limited
- Starring: Bobby Au-yeung; Maggie Shiu; Louis Yuen; Astrid Chan; Kenneth Chan; Eileen Yeow
- Theme music composer: Cheng Ming
- Opening theme: Destiny Beginning to End 緣分網開了 by Kit Chan
- Country of origin: Hong Kong
- Original language: Cantonese
- No. of episodes: 20

Production
- Producer: Yeung Kum-chun
- Production location: Hong Kong
- Camera setup: Multi camera
- Running time: 45 minutes
- Production company: TVB

Original release
- Network: TVB Jade
- Release: 28 September – 23 October 1998

Web of Love
- Chinese: 網上有情人
- Simplified Chinese: 网上有情人
- Literal meaning: "Have An Internet Lover"
Transcriptions
Standard Mandarin
- Hanyu Pinyin: wǎng shàng yǒu qíng rén
Yue: Cantonese
- Jyutping: mong5 soeng5 jau5 cing4 jan4

Web of Love (Chinese: 網上有情人; Jyutping: mong5 soeng5 jau5 cing4 jan4; literally "Have An Internet Lover") is a 1998 Hong Kong romantic comedy television drama created and produced by TVB, starring Bobby Au-yeung, Maggie Shiu, Louis Yuen, Astrid Chan, Kenneth Chan and Eileen Yeow as the main cast. First original broadcast began on Hong Kong's Jade channel September 28 till October 23, 1998 every Monday through Friday during its 7:35 to 8:35pm timeslot with a total of 20 episodes.

== Synopsis ==
Kwok Ho-tung (Bobby Au-yeung) is the top salesman for a wine distribution company. He relies on the Internet for everything. He searches the internet to find customers outside of Hong Kong, looks for ways to break up with his clingy girlfriend and find people online to chat anonymously with when he needs to vent about work and life. One day after work Ho-tung purchases a new computer but finds it too heavy to carry home, His elderly co-worker who has also purchased a computer suggests they borrow a hand truck from a friend he knows. While trying to find the friend with the hand truck, Ho-tung's elderly co-worker gets injured accidentally by produce shop owner Chung Wai-hung (Maggie Shiu), who is helping an elderly illegal peddler escape from ticketing officers. Ho-tung and Wai-hung have a heated argument but leave it as is on the request of Ho-tung's elderly co-worker who is also acquainted with Wai-hung.

Since his elderly co-worker is the least productive salesman at the wine company he works a side job as a night school teacher. Due to his injury he is unable to teach his class, so Ho-tung volunteers to substitute for him until he recovers. On his first night teaching the class, Ho-tung is unprepared and surprised that Wai-hung is one of the students. The two have further misunderstandings as teacher and pupil when each thinks the other is singling the other out. After clarifying each other's personalities, each realizes the other is not as bad as they thought.

Ho-tung's workplace gets a new boss who is the son-in-law of the company's owner. The new boss Chan Ka-wah (Kenneth Chan) brings along his own personal secretary Monica Dung Fung-hei (Astrid Chan) to the company. Ka-wah puts Monica in charge of the entire staff. During a company party Monica gets drunk, Ho-tung takes her home, while still at her apartment he finds out that Monica is Ka-wah's mistress. After further chatting with his anonymous online chat friend Apple about Monica he finds out that what Apple describe about herself matches Monica. Soon Ho-tung figures out that Monica is his online chat friend Apple. After finding out about Ka-wah and Monica's affair Ho-tung gets entangled in it when Ka-wah has him cover him so his wife won't find out about his affair with Monica. Through this, Monica and Ho-tung become close friends.

Wai-hung's family life starts to fall apart when her father comes back asking for forgiveness. He tells his entire family that he has form and changed his way but he has ulterior motives. He wants to take over the produce shop and exposes Wai-hung as not his birth daughter since she was adopted by his late wife when she was little. Her brother who feels Wai-hung should not inherit anything from the Chung family, even though Wai-hung provided for the family when their mother died, causes Wai-hung to leave the family. Not wanting to face a family that doesn't want her, Wai-hung moves into an extra room at Ho-tung's home. Unable to find suitable work, Ho-tung helps her get a job at the wine company.

Soon Monica finds out Ho-tung is her secret chat friend after noticing that he is always aware of her mood. When she exposes to Ho-tung about knowing about being chat room friends, the two grow closer as friends. With Ho-tung's encouragement and over frustrated with being strung along by Ka-wah, who has no intentions of leaving his wife, Monica decides to break it off with Ka-wah. Ka-wah who thinks Monica and Ho-tung have gotten together, seeks revenge by framing Ho-tung of embezzling from the wine company. With the help of his brother who is a computer genius, Ho-tung gets back at Ka-wah.

When all seems to be happy, Ho-tung and Wai-hung decide to marry, but soon she finds out that Ho-tung had feelings for Monica and leaves him without letting him know where she went. Ho-tung admits to Wai-hung's family that yes he does have feelings for Monica but it's Wai-hung whom he loves. So all Ho-tung can do is patiently wait for Wai-hung to come back.

== Cast ==
=== Main cast ===
- Bobby Au-yeung as Kwok Ho-tung 郭浩東
- Maggie Shiu as Chung Wai-hung 莊惠紅
- Louis Yuen as Leung Wai-bo 梁偉寶
- Eileen Yeow as Choi Yuk 蔡玉
- Kenneth Chan as Chan Ka-wah 陳家華
- Astrid Chan as Monica Dung Fung-hei 鄧鳳喜

=== Kwok family ===
- Yue Chi-ming as Kwok Tin-tak 郭天得
- Alice Fung So-bor as Choi Kam-hing 蔡金卿
- Simon Lo as Micheal Kwok Ho-nam 郭浩南

=== Chung family ===
- Helena Law as Lee Ah-choi 李阿采
- Lau Kong as Chung Yan 莊仁
- Stephen Ho as Chung Chi-yun 莊志遠
- Margaret Chung as Ivy Chung Wai-lan 莊惠蘭

=== Wine company staff ===
- Bruce Li as Fei Chi-gei 費子基
- Joe Junior as Ko Wai-ting 高威亭
- Leung Kin-ping as Deng Na-ping 鄧亞平
- Edward Mok as Chow Chi-kit 周志杰
- Amy Chung as Cookie Cheung May-lei 張美莉
- Sugar Yau as Emily
- Koei Leung as Cindy

=== Extended cast ===
- Wilson Tsui as Wong on-sing 王安勝
- Timmy Hung as Roy Chuk Ming-jun 卓明俊
- Hoyan Mok as Helen
- Wong Hoi-lam as Siu Son 小新
- Ho Ka-jun as Chu jie 朱仔
- Lau Mei-shan as Karen
