= Margaret Chung (actress) =

Canadian actress

- Born: 3 November 1976 (age 48); Toronto, Ontario
- Occupation(s): model, actor, and yoga instructor
- Years active: 1997–2006
- Spouse: Nardone Ruggero (m. 2010)
- Children: 2 (daughters)

Chinese name
- Chinese: 鍾麗淇
Transcriptions
Standard Mandarin
- Hanyu Pinyin: Zhōng Lìqí

Margaret Chung Lai Kei (sometimes romanized as Chung Lai-kai, Chinese: 鍾麗淇; pinyin: Zhōng Lìqí, born 3 November 1976 in Toronto) is a Hong Kong–based model, actor and yoga instructor.

== Personal life ==
She was born and raised in Toronto, Ontario as the youngest of three siblings, and moved to Hong Kong at age 18 after signing a five-year contract with TVB. At age 21, she began to support her family with her earnings after her father retired.

Chung was romantically linked to Joey Leung, but the pair split in 2006. Chung married businessman Nardone Ruggero in July 2010, and they have two daughters. Her older daughter, Isabella, has Wolf–Hirschhorn syndrome.

== Filmography ==
=== Television (TVB) ===
Year	Title	Character	Notes
1997	Detective Investigation Files III 《刑事偵緝檔案III》	李思龍	Second-billed
1997	Untraceable Evidence 《鑑證實錄》	聶津津	Third-billed
1998	Web of Love 《網上有情人》	莊慧蘭	Second-billed
1998	Justice Sung II 《狀王宋世杰II》	楚楚	Supporting cast
1999	Ups and Downs 《無業樓民》	Bonnie	Supporting cast
1999	Face to Face 《雙面伊人》	Kelly	Supporting cast
1999	Untraceable Evidence II 《鑑證實錄II》	聶津津	Third-billed
2000	Incurable Traits 《醫神華佗》	華玉	Third-billed
2000	Street Fighters 《廟街·媽·兄弟》	洛詠琪	Second-billed
2001	In the Realm of Success 《公私戀事多》	Clara	Supporting cast
2003	Fate Twisters 《黑夜彩虹》	王秀兒（KiKi）	Third-billed
2003	Not Just a Pretty Face 《美麗在望》	鐘碧儀（Betty）	Supporting cast
2003	Triumph in the Skies 《冲上雲霄》	丘惠琪（Vicky）	Supporting cast
2003	Extraordinary Love 《富豪海灣非凡情緣》	Joan	
2004	The Last Breakthrough 《天涯俠醫》	蘇惠珊（Susan）	Supporting cast
2004	Dream of Colours 《下一站彩虹》	Donna	Supporting cast
2006	Summer Heat 《心慌·心郁·逐個捉》	賈婉君	Third-billed

=== Film ===
Year	Title	Character	Notes
1998	Love in the River 《男人胸,女人Home》		
2001	Stolen Love 《別戀》	Annie	
2004	The Marksman 《神槍手》	Siu Man	
2005	Where Is Mama's Boy? 《我亞媽發仔瘟》	Yu Huan	
2015	She Remembers, He Forgets 《哪一天我們會飛》	Cindy	
