= Anne Heung =

Hong Kong-born Canadian actress and model

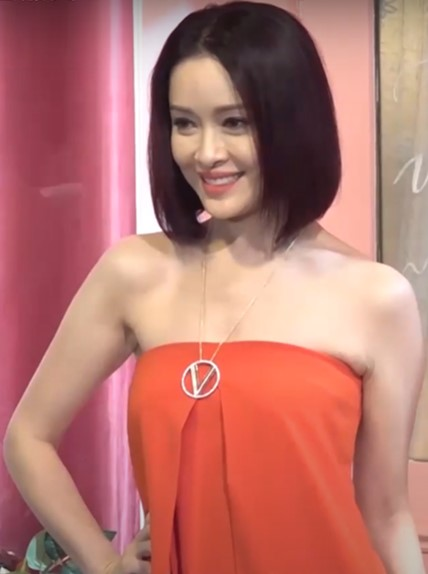
- Heung in 2019
- Born: 2 October 1974 (age 51); British Hong Kong
- Occupations: Actress; singer; model; spokesperson; event planner
- Years active: 1998–2008 (contract ended)

Chinese name
- Traditional Chinese: 向海嵐
- Simplified Chinese: 向海岚
Transcriptions
Standard Mandarin
- Hanyu Pinyin: Xiàng Hǎilán
Yue: Cantonese
- Jyutping: Hoeng3 Hoi2-laam4

Anne Heung Hoi-lam (born 2 October 1974) is a Hongkonger-Canadian actress, model and beauty pageant titleholder. She was formerly under contract to the television station TVB. She left TVB in 2008 for new business ventures but returned to media work in 2015.

== Life and career ==
=== Early days & Miss HK 1998 ===
Heung family root traceback to Shanghai, she was born in Hong Kong, and later went to Canada, where she studied economics at the University of British Columbia.

Heung later returned to Hong Kong and competed in the Miss Hong Kong in 1998, where she was crowned and won three awards. She represented Hong Kong in the Miss Chinese International Pageant 1999 and was crowned the second runner up. She also competed in the international pageant, Miss Universe 1999, but did not place in the top 10 semifinalists. Like many before her, the top ranking winners of the beauty pageant are given an opportunity to contract with HK TVB and promoted as one of their new featured actresses.

=== 1998–2008 TVB career ===
After completing her training in acting, Heung often starred in action, comedic, and political TVB drama series. She has starred in many drama series like Detective Investigation Files, Riches and Stitches, The Charm Beneath, Seed of Hope, and most notably The Legend of Lady Yang, in which she played Yang Guifei, the beloved consort of Emperor Xuanzong of Tang. While at first heavily promoted, Heung noticed a slow-down in potential roles and felt her value had diminished as she was placed in third-line roles by 2007. By 2008, she had had no jobs available for nearly four months, and when she finally had an available role, it was an executive position. Feeling under-valued and that her career had peaked with TVB, she began to look elsewhere for new career opportunities. After completing her TVB filming commitments, Heung quietly parted ways with TVB. After a decade with TVB, Anne decided look towards the private sector in business and public relations.

=== Post-TVB and entrepreneurship ===
After retiring from TVB, Heung decided to venture into business. She is friends with 1977's HK pageant winner, Loletta Chu. With the help of Chu's businessman husband, Vincent Lo, Heung worked under the couple's property development company in Shanghai and later used her own funds to start her own wedding planning company. Although she left the entertainment industry, she is still remembered. Several media companies and businesses approached Heung to work for them in promotions. She occasionally appeared on media (in non-acting roles) such as food tourism, commercials, and being a spokesperson for a beauty salon in between her public relations work. However, it wasn't until recently she seriously considered making a return to acting.

=== Return to media in 2015 ===
In an interview in mid-2014, Heung expressed interest in returning to acting for TVB if the role was right for her. By 2015, Anne made her return to acting, starting with mainland China. She has been featured in several mainland TV series, hosted a few talk shows, and worked in stage plays. TVB has reached out to Anne to star in a drama but she hasn't been able to commit due to schedule conflicts. In 2020, she along with three former Miss HK pageant winners (Shirley Yeung, Halina Tam, and Theresa Lee) returned to HK media in ViuTV World's "Miss GoodViu."

== Awards ==
| Year | Category | Result |
|---|---|---|
| 1998 | Miss Hong Kong Pageant – Miss Hospitality | Won |
| 1998 | Miss Hong Kong Pageant – Universal Beauty Award | Won |
| 1998 | Miss Hong Kong Pageant – Miss Photogenic | Won |

== Filmography ==
| Title | Year | Role |
|---|---|---|
| Detective Investigation Files IV | 1999 | Leung Chin Chin |
| The Legend of Lady Yang | 2000 | Yeung Yuk-wan |
| Legendary Four Aces | 2000 | |
| Love is Beautiful | 2001 | Ling Wan |
| Love is Beautiful | 2001 | Cho Cho |
| Seven Sisters | 2001 | |
| The Stamp of Love | 2001 | |
| Golden Faith | 2002 | Sabrina |
| Life Begins at Forty | 2003 | Mok Hui Nam |
| Perish in the Name of Love | 2003 | Chan Yuen-yuen |
| Riches and Stitches | 2003 | Po Chui Lung |
| Seed of Hope | 2003 | |
| The W Files | 2003 | Lau Lai-ling |
| Hidden Treasures | 2004 | Kwok Lai-Kam |
| Love Bond | 2005 | Cheung Bik-Fun |
| The Charm Beneath | 2005 | Sung Wan-Seung |
| Bar Bender | 2006 | |
| Au Revoir Shanghai | 2006 | Ho Shui-Sau |
| Face to Fate | 2006 | Yeuk-Lan |
| Devil's Disciples | 2007 | Mo Yung Koo-Yuet |
| Best Bet | 2007 | Kong Ma-lei |
| Fathers and Sons | 2007 | Nicole |
| The Building Blocks of Life | 2007 | Cheung Lei (Lily) |

Achievements
| Preceded by Virginia Yung | Miss Hong Kong; 1998 | Succeeded by Sonija Kwok |
