= Melissa Ng =

Hong Kong actor

- Born: Melissa Wu Mei-hang; 9 February 1972 (age 54); Zhongshan, Guangdong, China
- Education: San Francisco State University
- Occupation: Actress
- Years active: 1996–2008
- Spouse: Jerry Wang (m. 2001)
- Children: 2

Chinese name
- Traditional Chinese: 吳美珩
- Simplified Chinese: 吴美珩
Transcriptions
Standard Mandarin
- Hanyu Pinyin: Wú Měihéng
Yue: Cantonese
- Jyutping: Ng4 Mei5-hang4

Melissa Ng Mei-hang (born 9 February 1972) is a retired American Hong Kong television actress born in China. She had been under contract to the television station TVB since 1996 after coming second in the Miss Chinese International Pageant, retiring from acting in 2007. Ng speaks fluent English with an American accent, Cantonese, and Mandarin. She currently resides in Hong Kong.

== Early life and family ==
Ng was born in Guangdong, China, where both her parents were doctors. She and her family immigrated to San Francisco, California, when Ng was nine years old. Ng has two elder sisters and a younger sister. In 2007, Ng revealed that she has been married to a Taiwanese businessman since 2001.

== Acting career ==
After graduating with a major in international relations and a minor in marketing at San Francisco State University, Ng entered the Hong Kong entertainment industry in 1996, after placing 1st runner up in Miss Chinese International 1996; she represented San Francisco after she won Miss Chinatown USA in 1992.

She began playing minor guest roles before quickly being offered the second female lead in the late 1990s gaining popularity quickly. In early to late 2000s, she played a number of diverse female lead roles in many popular and critically acclaimed TVB series with positive reviews and praise from audiences. Her many series include A Kindred Spirit, The Legend of Lady Yang, Secret of the Heart, Riches and Stitches, A Herbalist Affair, Healing Hands III, Into Thin Air. Her 2006 series La Femme Desperado and Love Guaranteed received the best and 4th best TVB series ratings of the year respectively with the first winning the TVB Anniversary Award for Best Series.

In 2007, she confirmed the rumours that she had been married since 2001 and that she was expecting her first child, which led to her having to pull out of filming several series while on maternity leave. In 2008, while promoting The Master of Tai Chi, she stated that she plans to return and continue filming for TVB very soon. It was later confirmed by TVB that she ultimately made the decision to retire from acting and focus on her family. She has since kept a low profile.

== Pageant career ==
Ng was crowned Miss Chinatown USA 1992. After winning the Miss Chinatown USA Pageant based in the city of San Francisco, she represented San Francisco at Miss Chinese International 1996. Ng had an interview during the final night, where she challenged Eric Tsang, and was later crowned as 1st runner up. Due to her strong Cantonese and communication skills, she earned a contract with TVB. Ng was one of the emcee's for the 2002 Miss Chinese International Pageant.

== Filmography ==
| Year | Title | Role | Notes |
|---|---|---|---|
| 1997 | Dark Tales 2 | | Supporting role |
| 1997 | Untraceable Evidence | Tam Wai Yan | Guest role |
| 1997 | Detective Investigation Files III | Yu Siu Yu | Guest role |
| 1998 | A Place of One's Own | | Main cast |
| 1998 | Burning Flame | Ching Nga | Minor role |
| 1998 | Secret of the Heart | Kam Fung Yan (Jo) | Supporting role |
| 1998 | Journey To The West II | | Cameo |
| 1999 | Detective Investigation Files IV | Chow Yeuk Mui / Lam Wing Hang | Guest role |
| 1999 | Till When Do Us Part | Amanda | Second lead role |
| 1999 | A Kindred Spirit | Law San Chiu | Supporting role |
| 2000 | The Legend of Lady Yang | Concubine Mui | Second lead role |
| 2000 | A Matter of Customs | Pao Kei-kwan | Supporting role |
| 2000 | The Green Hope | Shum Kai Kwan | Supporting role |
| 2000 | Crimson Sabre | Wan Yee/Wan Sin | Main cast |
| 2000 | Death Trap ''Telemovie'' | | Supporting role |
| 2001 | ICAC Investigators 2000 | Anna | Main cast Part 1 out of 5 |
| 2001 | Hope for Sale | Yim Mei Chu | Second lead role |
| 2002 | A Herbalist Affair | Keung Sam Yuet | Main cast |
| 2002 | Good Against Evil | Yung Siu Dien | Supporting role |
| 2003 | The King of Yesterday and Tomorrow | Shum Yat-Oi (Rachel) | Second lead role |
| 2004 | Riches and Stitches | Lang Heung Ling | Main cast |
| 2004 | The Conqueror's Story | Consort Yu | Main cast |
| 2004 | Dream of Colours | Poon Bo Ling (Elaine) | Main cast |
| 2005 | Fantasy Hotel | Yung Ka Man | Lead role |
| 2005 | Into Thin Air | Lai Siu/Mok Wai Chi | Lead role |
| 2005 | Healing Hands III | Yip To (Sarah) | Main cast |
| 2006 | La Femme Desperado | Ko Chi Ling | Lead role |
| 2006 | Love Guaranteed | Kuk Yeuk Hei (Hazel) | Lead role |
| 2008 | The Master of Tai Chi | Song Ching | Lead role |

== Awards ==
- 1996 Miss Chinese International Pageant: First Runner Up
- 1992 Miss Chinatown USA Winner
