= Devily Leung =

Hong Kong television actress

Devily Leung Lai-ying (梁麗瑩 born 15 January 1984) is a Hong Kong television actress.

== Biography ==
Educated in Hong Kong, in Wellington, New Zealand and in Melbourne, Australia, she joined the competition of TVB Weekly Cover Girl held by TVB and she was placed the third. She was a finalist of the 2004 Miss Hong Kong beauty pageant.

In 2005, she appeared in the TVB series Fantasy Hotel.

== Filmography ==
- Fantasy Hotel (2005)
- Maidens' Vow (2006)
- On the First Beat (2007)
- The Building Blocks of Life (2007)
- ICAC Investigators 2007 (2007)
- Sweetness in the Salt (2009)
- A Great Way to Care (2009)
- Beyond the Realm of Conscience (2009)
- Can't Buy Me Love (2010)
- The Fortune Buddies (2011)
- Three Kingdoms RPG (2012)
- The Confidant (2012)
- The Day of Days (2013)
- A Great Way to Care II (2013)
- Bullet Brain (2013)
- Karma Rider (2013)
- Brick Slaves (2015)
- Presumed Accidents (2016)
