= Riches and Stitches =

Hong Kong television series

- Poster
- 鳳舞香羅
- Genre: Period drama
- Written by: Chan Ching Yee; Leung Wing Mui
- Starring: Moses Chan; Kwong Wa; Anne Heung; Gigi Lai; Melissa Ng; Marco Ngai; Michael Tong
- Theme music composer: Andrew Tuason
- Opening theme: Riches and Stitches (鳳舞香羅) by Priscilla Chan
- Country of origin: Hong Kong
- Original language: Cantonese
- No. of episodes: 30

Production
- Producer: Siu Hin Fai
- Production location: Hong Kong
- Camera setup: Multi camera
- Production company: TVB

Original release
- Network: TVB Drama
- Release: 27 June – 5 August 2005

Riches and Stitches
- Traditional Chinese: 鳳舞香羅
- Simplified Chinese: 凤舞香罗
Transcriptions
Standard Mandarin
- Hanyu Pinyin: Fèng Wǔ Xiāng Luó
Yue: Cantonese
- Jyutping: Fung6 Mou5 Heong1 Lo4

Riches and Stitches is a Hong Kong period drama produced by TVB starring Moses Chan, Kwong Wah, Anne Heung, Gigi Lai, and Melissa Ng. It was filmed in 2003, and then released overseas in December 2003. Then it was aired on TVB Pay Vision's TVB Drama channel from 27 June to 5 August 2005. However, it has yet to be aired on TVB Jade.

== Plot ==
Siu Chun Hang (Moses Chan) has had a special affection for Cheongsam. He makes his first cheongsam for his dream girl Po Chui Lung (Anne Heung), formerly a princess of the Qing Dynasty. He makes alterations to Lung's cheongsam, resulting in a design that is simple but elegant. Since then, he has become well known for his skills as a tailor and a designer. But life is full of ups and downs. Who would have guessed that his success is just the beginning of his downfall?

Lung works for triad member Wing Ho Tung (Kwong Wa), owner of a nightclub. Lung suggests Hang designs clothes for Lang Heung Ling (Melissa Ng), a top dancer from Tung's nightclub, so that he can further develop his career. Though famous for his cheongsam, things do not really go well for Hang. And because of what is brother Cheung (Michael Tong) has done, Hang gets into serious trouble.

There seems to be no hope for Hang. But then there comes an angel － Hoi Tong (Gigi Lai), a singer and Cheung's ex-girlfriend, sticks by him and does her best to help him through his darkest moments. Meanwhile, Lung and Tung also make a great effort to him build up his confidence......

== Cast ==
=== The Siu family ===
Cast	Role	Description
Bowie Wu	Siu Hok Yu 邵學儒	Siu Chun Hang and Siu Chun Cheung' father
Moses Chan	Siu Chun Hang 邵晉鏗	A tailor Siu Hok Yu's older son Siu Chun Cheung's older brother Po Chui Lung's boyfriend, breaks up later Miu Hoi Tong's love interest Wing Ho Tung's good friend
Michael Tong	Siu Chun Cheung 邵晉鏘	Siu Hok Yu's younger son Siu Chun Hang's younger brother Miu Hoi Tong's boyfriend, breaks up later Lang Heung Ling's ex-lover Koon Chung Sing's love rival Stabbed and killed by Koon Chung Sing in episode 26

=== The Po family ===
Cast	Role	Description
Manna Chan	Po Kam Seung Wan 寶金湘雲	Po Chui Lung's mother
Anne Heung	Po Chui Lung 寶翠瓏	Former Qing Dynasty princess "Yu Ka Kitchen" owner Po kam Seung Wan's daughter Siu Chun Hang's girlfriend, breaks up later Wing Ho Tung's secretary, later girlfriend Miu Hoi Tong's good friend

=== Fung Mo Stage (鳳舞臺) ===
Cast	Role	Description
Melissa Ng	Lang Heung Ling 冷香泠	Fung Mo Stage owner Koon Chung Sing's lover Loves Wing Ho Tung; Siu Chun Cheung's ex-lover Killed by Koon Chung Sing in episode 29
Gigi Lai	Miu Hoi Tong 苗海棠	Tubu Empress; Former Juggling Troupe member Siu Chun Cheung's ex-girlfriend Later loves Siu Chun Hang; Po Chui Lung's good friend Shot and killed by Koon Chung Sing in episode 30
Bruce Li (李鴻杰)	Leader Yiu 姚團長	Song and dance troupe leader
June Chan (陳琪)	Pak Lan 白蘭	Miu Hoi Tong's sworn sister
Iris Wong (黃泆潼)		Fung Mo Stage dancer
Reyan Yan (殷櫻)		Fung Mo Stage dancer
Janice Shum (沈可欣)		Fung Mo Stage dancer

=== Fuk On Tong Gang (幫會福安堂) ===
Cast	Role	Description
Eddy Ko	San Pak Chuen 辛百川	Gang leader, later passed down position to Wing Ho Tung; San King Tin's father
Kwong Wa	Wing Ho Tung 榮昊東	Gang leader and Fung Mo Stage owner San Pak Chuen's underling Koon Chung Sing's boss Siu Chun Hang's good friend and love rival Loves Po Chui Lung, later her boyfriend Shot and killed Koon Chung Sing in episode 30
Marco Ngai	Koon Chung Sing 官頌昇	Wing Ho Tung's underling Lang Heung Ling's lover Siu Chun Cheung's love rival Killed Siu Chun Cheung, Lang Heung Ling and Miu Hoi Tong; Shot and killed by Wing Ho Tung in episode 30 (villain)
Ken Lok (駱達華)	San King Tin 辛競天	San Pak Chuen's son Died of an accident in episode 6 (villain)
Lam King Kong (林敬剛)	Kiu Tai 喬泰	Wing Ho Tung's underling
Lo Mang	Boss Chin 錢老大	Wing Ho Tung's good friend
Ngo Ka-nin		Koon Chung Sing's underling

=== Other cast ===
Cast	Role	Description
Chan Ka Yee (陳嘉儀)	Cheung Yuen Kwan 蔣婉君	Once saved Wing Ho Tung, later became his butler
Gregory Charles Rivers	Mister Rimet 雷米先生	French Concession consul
Cheng Tse Sing (鄭子誠)	Wu Cheuk Fu 胡卓夫	Hung Hau district gang leader
Yuen Tak Cheung (阮德鏘)		Chun To's boyfriend
Victoria Jane Jolly (左慧琪)		
Jenny Shing (成珈瑩)	Ting Oi 天愛	Hoi Tong's fan
Po Choi Fan (保采芬)		
Nancy Wu		Po Family kitchen staff
Summer Joe (夏竹欣)		Po Family kitchen staff
