= Detective Investigation Files III =

1997 Hong Kong television series

- 刑事偵緝檔案 III
- Genre: Police procedural drama
- Starring: Michael Tao; Joey Leung; Kenix Kwok; Margaret Chung; Law Koon Lan; Liu Kai-chi; Monica Chan; Winnie Yeung
- Opening theme: 難得情真 by Edmond Leung
- Country of origin: Hong Kong
- Original language: Cantonese
- No. of episodes: 40

Production
- Producer: Poon Ka Tak
- Running time: approx. 45 minutes

Original release
- Network: Television Broadcasts Limited
- Release: September 1 – October 24, 1997

Related
- Detective Investigation Files I Detective Investigation Files II; Detective Investigation Files IV

Detective Investigation Files III is a 1997 TVB production. It was a direct sequel to Detective Investigation Files II and the third installment in the Detective Investigation Files Series. The series ran for 40 episodes. Only Michael Tao, Joey Leung and Kenix Kwok returned to reprise their roles from the previous two installments. Louisa So, Amy Kwok, Joseph Lee and Sammi Cheng did not participate in this series; instead they were replaced by Margaret Chung, Law Koon Lan, Liu Kai-chi, Monica Chan and Winnie Yeung who portrayed new characters. This installment featured 10 cases.

== Cast ==
=== Main cast ===
Actor	Role	Description
Michael Tao	Cheung Tai Yung (張大勇)	張Sir、勇哥、大勇; Inspector; Detective; Jessie's husband Lee Chung Yi's best friend Pak Yan Tung's ex-boyfriend
Kenix Kwok	Ko Chit (高婕)	Jessie、「細妹」 reporter Cheung Tai Yung's wife Deborah's niece
Joey Leung	Lee Chung Yi (李忠義)	義仔、師兄; Sergeant; Detective; Cheung Tai Yung's best friend and subordinate Sasa's ex-boyfriend Lee Sze Lung's boyfriend
Margaret Chung	Lee Sze Lung (李思龍)	「o靚妹」 Constable; Detective; Cheung Tai Yung's subordinate Lee Chung Yi's girlfriend Harvey's best friend Former girl guide
Liu Kai-chi	Chak Wing Tin (翟永田)	田哥; Experienced Sergeant; Cheung Dai Yung's subordinate Deborah's lover, later husband Grievously hurt by Johnson in episode 38
Monica Chan	Pak Yan Tung (柏恩桐)	Ex insurance manager restaurant manager Cheung Tai Yung's classmate and ex-girlfriend Poisoned to death by Johnson in episode 37
Law Koon Lan	Chu Sau Kwan (朱秀筠)	Deborah、筠姐; Jessie's aunt Chak Wing Tin's ex lover, later wife Johnson's ex-girlfriend
Winnie Yeung	Szeto Sasa (司徒莎莎)	Lee Chung Yi's ex-girlfriend Former girl guide Appeared in episode 14; Left Hong Kong in episode 40

== Cases ==
=== Case 1: The Other Jessie (Episode 1–5) ===
Actor	Role	Description
Patrick Tam	Ho Chi Wan (何志宏)	Stephen、何醫生; Doctor; Ning Qian Hua's boyfriend Murdered Tony and tried to murder Jessie; Sentenced to death in episode 5 (Villain)
Kenix Kwok	Ko Chit (高婕)	See Main Cast
Kenix Kwok	Ning Qianhua (寧倩華)	Vivian、阿倩; Originally from Guangzhou; Ho Chi Wan's girlfriend Switched identities with Jessie and escaped to Hong Kong; Sentenced to death in episode 5 (Semi-Villain)
Eric Li	Law To Fung (羅道風)	Tony、羅醫生; Doctor; Ho Chi Wan's friend Murdered by Ho Chi Wan in Beijing in episode 1
Leung Kin Ping	Wang Haosheng (王浩生)	Blackmailed Gary Shek and Ning Qianhua; Murdered by Ning Qianhua in Beijing in episode 1 (Villain)
Lan Tianying	Lan Qing (藍青)	Blackmail Gary Shek with Wang Haosheng; Arrested in episode 2 (Villain)
Emotion Cheung	Gary Shek (石少維)	Blackmailed by Wang Haosheng and Lan Qing in Beijing
Wu Suqin	Fu Zhaohong (伏照紅)	Cheung Tai Yung's friend Qiao Jin's mother
Tu Ling	Jiang Yang (姜楊)	楊楊; Qiao Jin's wife
Ronnie Ching	Qiao Jin (喬進)	Cheung Tai Yung's friend Fu Zhaohong's son Beijing's Gong An(Police)
Lu Wanfen	Ding Miao (丁苗)	小苗; Beijing's Gong An(Police)
Shen Xingming	Zhu Jin (朱謹)	小朱; Beijing's Gong An(Police)
Zheng Ruixiao	Chai Jun (柴軍)	小柴; Beijing's Gong An(Police)
Melissa Ng	Yu Xiaoyu (于小愉)	Ko Chit's Lawyer
Wong Tai-wai	Zheng Guoping (鄭國平)	Mainland Lawyer

=== Case 2: Rape and Revenge (Episode 6–9) ===
Actor	Role	Description
Karen Tong	Cheng So Sam (鄭素心)	Lui Sai Ho's wife Lui Chin Mei's mother Deceased
Karen Tong	Lui Chin Mei (呂展媚)	Lui Sai Ho's step daughter Raped by Lui Sai Ho; Killed Lui Sai Ho in episode 6 Committed suicide in episode 9 (Villain)
Lau Kong	Lui Sai Ho (呂世豪)	Lai Chin Mei's step father Raped Lui Chin Mei; Killed by Lui Chin Mei in episode 6 (Villain)

=== Case 3: Unexpected Murderer (Episode 10–12) ===
Actor	Role	Description
Lisa Lui	Yu Bik Ling (余碧玲)	玲姐; Famous chef Deborah's rival Killed by Sham Yeuk Mui
Strawberry Yeung	Shum Yeuk Mui (沈若玫)	Chef; Killed Yu Bik Ling; Arrested in episode 12 (Villain)

=== Case 4: Love-hate Struggle (Episode 13–15) ===
Actor	Role	Description
Monica Chan	Pak Yan Tung	See#Main Cast
Derek Kok	Hui Wai Lin	William musician Pak Yan Tung's ex-husband Killed Choi Chi Kim in self-defense in episode 13; Died in accident in episode 15 (Villain)
Edward Mok	Choi Chi Kim	Killed by William in episode 13 (Villain)

=== Case 5: Butterfly Triggers (Episode 16–18) ===
Actor	Role	Description
Timmy Ho	Ching Sau Mong	大B哥哥; Sasa's childhood friend Tried to cover Ching Sau On's murder
Lee Hung Kit	Ching Sau On	大Dee; Ching Sau Mong's older brother Killed Jim Chui Yi; Mental patient Killed by both Wu Kin and Chan Tai in episode 19
Irene Wong	Jim Chui Yi	Johnson's daughter Killed by Ching Sau on in episode 17

=== Case 6: A Furious Affair (Episode 19–23) ===
Actor	Role	Description
Henry Lee	Chung Man Hoi	Jessie's boss Killed Harvey, Stella and tried to kill Mak Ho Hing; Arrested in episode 23 (Villain)
May Kwong	Mak Ho Hing	Florist; Chung Man Hoi's mistress and partner in crime Died in episode 23 (Villain)
Gabriel Harrison	Cheung Yat Fei	Harvey photographer Cheung Tai Yung's half younger brother Stella's ex-boyfriend Killed by Chung Man Hoi
Kan Pui Kwan	Mok Wing Hei	Stella Mok、鍾太; Chung Man Hoi's wife Harvey's ex-girlfriend Raped by Yip Wei and gave birth to son, suspected to be Harvey's son Killed by Chung Man Hoi

=== Case 7: Now You See Me, Now You Don't (Episode 24–27) ===
Actor	Role	Description
Albert Law	Ting Hon Cheung	Hui Chau Yi's husband Kidnapper; Shot and killed by Johnson in episode 27 (Villain)
Cecilia Fong	Hui Chau Yi	Ting Hon Cheung's wife

=== Case 8: The Charlatan Murders (Episode 28–31) ===
Actor	Role	Description
Choi Kok Hing	Wan Ko Tin	Charlatan; Pak Yan Tung's paternal grandfather Stabbed to death by Tam Chi Long
Chin Kar Lok	Cho Heung Tung	向東表哥、表少教師; Pak Yan Tung's cousin Manipulated Tam Chi Long to commit the murders Finally inherited all the assets from Wan's family (Villain)
Joe Ma	Tam Chi Long	Doctor; Killed Wan Ko Tin, arrested in episode 31 (Villain)

=== Case 9: The Precious Stone (Episode 32–37) ===
Actor	Role	Description
Law Lok Lam	Fong Sung Yip	Lee Sze Lung's father Sasa's boss Vietnam War veteran Killed by Chiang Yiu
Eileen Yeow	Fong Nim Ching	Fong Sung Yip's youngest daughter Lee Sze Lung's younger sister Chiu King Seng's wife
Wong Kai Tak	Chiu King Seng	成哥（28歲） Fong Sung Yip's son-in-law, Fong Nim Ching's husband Ho Siu Lai's lover Killed Chiang Yiu; Arrested in episode 37 (Villain)
Angela Tong	Ho Siu Lai	Erica; Chiu King Seng's lover Abetted Chiu King Seng in the murders (Villain)
Iwanbeo Leung	Chiang Yiu	Sculptor; Lesbian; Fong Sung Yip's fiance Killed Fong Sung Yip; Killed by Chiu King Seng (Semi-villain)

=== Case 10: Backstage Manipulator (Episode 37–40) ===
Actor	Role	Description
Kam Hing Yin	Jim Pak Hung (Johnson)	詹Sir; Chief Inspector; Jim Chui Yi's father Manipulated the events of Case 5, 7 and 9 Arrested in episode 40 (Main Villain)
Wilson Tsui	Wu Kin	Chak Wing Tin's good friend Killed Ching Sau On; Kidnapped Fong Sung Yip and Lee Sze Lung; Conspired with Chan Tai to extort Johnson; Stabbed to death by Johnson (Villain)
Yau Man Seng	Chan Tai	Wu Kin's partner in crime Killed Ching Sau On; Kidnapped Fong Sung Yip and Lee Sze Lung; Conspired with Wu Kin to extort Johnson; Shot and killed by Johnson (Villain)
Celine Ma	Helen	Wu Kin's girlfriend Shot and killed in the back by Johnson
Monica Chan	Pak Yan Tung	Cheung Tai Yung's classmate and ex-girlfriend Poisoned to death by Johnson
Simon Sit	Sun Keng Do	Village tramp and witnessed Johnson's crimes Fell to death after being pushed by Johnson
Chiu Shek Man	Chou Sir	周Sir; Superintendent; Johnson's superior Accidentally poisoned to death by Johnson
Liu Kai-chi	Chak Wing Tin (翟永田)	田哥; Cheung Dai Yung's subordinate Deborah's lover, later husband Grievously hurt by Johnson in episode 38

== See also ==
- Detective Investigation Files Series
