= The Charm Beneath =

2005 period drama television series

- The Charm Beneath poster
- 胭脂水粉
- Genre: Period Drama
- Starring: Moses Chan; Gigi Lai; Yoyo Mung; Anne Heung
- Opening theme: "鏡花" by Gigi Lai
- Ending theme: "痕跡" by Moses Chan
- Country of origin: Hong Kong
- Original language: Cantonese
- No. of episodes: 30

Production
- Producer: Mui Siu-ching
- Running time: 45 minutes (approx.)

Original release
- Network: TVB
- Release: October 17 – November 25, 2005

The Charm Beneath (Traditional Chinese: 胭脂水粉) is a TVB period drama series broadcast in October 2005. The series was shown to celebrate TVB's 38th Anniversary.

Sheren Tang and Bobby Au-Yeung were originally cast in this series instead of Gigi Lai and Moses Chan when the teaser trailer premiered in the TVB sales presentation in 2005.

== Synopsis ==
They hide a dagger in a smile,
Are they driven by desire for power,
Or is it their only way to survive?

== Cast ==
=== The Chuk family ===
Cast	Role	Description
Chan Hung Lit	Chuk Moon-Shan 祝滿山	Geng Fa Tong (鏡花堂) Founder; Chuk Moon-Tin's older brother. Chuk Yau-Shing, Chuk Yau-Yip, Chuk Ming-Man's father. Died in episode 19 by Heart Failure
Helen Ma	Lo Siu Ngan 路笑顏	Chuk Yau-Shing, Chuk Yau-Yip, Chuk Ming-Man's mother.
Mary Hon (韓馬利)	Chan Ying-Hung 陳影紅	Chuk Ming-Wai and Ling Tin-Long's mother.
Savio Tsang (曾偉權)	Chuk Yau-Shing 祝有成	Sung Wan-Seung's husband. Chuk Moon-Shan's eldest son.-Died in episode 3 probably by internal bleeding
Anne Heung	Sung Wan-Seung 宋雲裳	Chuk Yau-Shing's wife. Probably dead in episode 30 by drowning
Moses Chan	Chuk Yau-Yip 祝有業	Wong Hiu-Ching's boyfriend. Chuk Moon-Shan's son.
Gigi Lai	Chuk Ming-Wai 祝明蕙	Lai Kwok-Cheung's wife. Chuk Moon-Shan and Chan Ying-Hung's daughter.
Ram Chiang	Lai Kwok-Cheung 黎國昌	Chuk Ming-Wai's husband.
Mandy Cho	Chuk Ming-Man 祝明敏	Chuk Moon-Shan's daughter.
Fred Cheng	Ling Tin-Long 寧天朗	Chan Ying-Hung's son. Chuk Ming-Wai's step brother.
Li Kwok Lun (李國麟)	Chuk Moon-Tin 祝滿田	Li Ah-Sin's husband. Chuk Moon-Shan's younger brother. Chuk Yau-Bong's father. Jailed for attempted murder in episode 30
Kiki Sheung (商天娥)	Li Ah-Sin 李雅仙	Chuk Moon-Tin's wife. Chuk Yau-Bong's mother.
Ngo Ka-nin	Chuk Yau-Bong 祝有邦	Chuk Moon-Tin and Li Ah-Sin's son. Died in episode 22 by brain damage or severe head injury

=== The Ng family ===
Cast	Role	Description
Jones Soong (宋本中)	Mr. Ng	Ng Yi-Fong and Ng Yi-Ching's father. Deceased.
Angelina Lo (盧宛茵)	Ng Lo Siu-Yung 吳路笑容	Ng Yi-Fong and Ng Yi-Ching's mother.
Yoyo Mung	Ng Yi-Fong 吳以方	Ng Lo Siu-Yung's daughter. Ng Yi-Ching's older sister.
Oscar Leung (梁烈唯)	Ng Yi-Ching 吳以正	Ng Lo Siu-Yung's son. Ng Yi-Fong's younger brother.

=== The Wang family ===
Cast	Role	Description
Michael Tong	Wong Hiu-Fai 汪曉暉	Wong Hiu-Ching's older brother. Died in episode 25 by murder
Sharon Chan	Wong Hiu-Ching 汪曉晴	Wong Hiu-Fai's younger sister. Chuk Yau-Yip's girlfriend.

== Reception ==
With the grand production title and boasted a very impressive casts, TVB Had spent the amount of money and highly promotion into the production, likely to granted out Anniversary Series as well as set out to create a 1930s version of successful's War and Beauty but returned the disappoint rating then they been expected due to the various of reason about viewers' taste and the way the drama portray different so far from War's Darken plot, making the grand production which failed. Began with 27 average point and minor growth in the following, praised the cast and producer an unhopeful high rating already. The Drama ended up with a bit better result with 32 average point with highest peak at 36 although it still couldn't compare to War and Beauty's final rating.

Despite the loss in the terms of rating, The Charm Beneath pressed out with a majority of positive reviews, began critical acclaims. one of the Outstanding drama of 2005 already considered in some reviews, deemed it classics. The Drama had memorable with Anne Heung's villain. Other began with cast's Disturbing acting and well script. Its theme song also recognized well into its story line with the quiet but breathtaking sound. After all, The Drama garner enough for two female nomination at TVB's 38th Anniversary award with Gigi Lai for Best Actress and Kiki Sheung for Best Supporting actress.

== Viewership ratings ==
	Week	Episode	Average Points	Peaking Points	References
1	October 17–21, 2005	1 — 5	27	—	
2	October 24–28, 2005	6 — 10	27	—	
3	October 31 - November 4, 2005	11 — 15	28	—	
4	November 7–11, 2005	16 — 20	29	—	
5	November 14–18, 2005	21 — 25	31	—	
6	November 21–25, 2005	26 — 30	32	36	
