= Seed of Hope =

- 俗世情真
- Starring: Patrick Tam; Kenix Kwok; Anne Heung
- Opening theme: "全靠我沒有" by Patrick Tam
- Country of origin: Hong Kong
- Original language: Cantonese
- No. of episodes: 30

Production
- Running time: 45 minutes (approx.)

Original release
- Network: TVB
- Release: September 15 – October 24, 2003

Seed of Hope (Chinese: 俗世情真) is a Television Broadcasts Limited drama released on 23 June 2003 in Hong Kong. It was screened on TVB Jade.

== Cast ==
- Patrick Tam
- Kenix Kwok
- Anne Heung
- Wayne Lai
- Kingdom Yuen
- Ellesmere Choi
- Cheung Tsi Kwong
- Gordon Liu
- Ching Ho Wai
