= Into Thin Air (TV series) =

- 人間蒸發
- Genre: Modern Drama
- Starring: Michael Miu; Melissa Ng; Bernice Liu; Kenneth Ma; Power Chan
- Opening theme: "實情" by Bernice Liu
- Country of origin: Hong Kong
- Original language: Cantonese
- No. of episodes: 20

Production
- Running time: 45 minutes (approx.)

Original release
- Network: TVB
- Release: September 26 – October 21, 2005

Into Thin Air (Traditional Chinese: 人間蒸發) is a TVB modern drama series broadcast in September 2005.

== Synopsis ==
Looking for a missing person is as difficult as looking for one fish in the ocean.

Ko Chung Ching (Michael Miu), an ex-policeman, quit his job to set up a private investigation company two years ago, right after his son Tsun Sing went missing because of a slap while Miu was searching for the "Rose Killer". His subordinates include Man Kai Ching Super (Power Chan), Man Tai Po (Bernice Liu) and Lam Yan Yan (Vivien Yeo).Kenneth Ma plays the cop who takes on Miu's "Rose Killer" case. Ching works and carries on looking for Sing. He meets Lai Siu (Melissa Ng) the manager of a group of part-time actors. She learns by chance that she was involved in Sing's disappearance, and as such feels guilty, so agrees to help find Sing. She uncovers a few clues and finds out Sing's disappearance is connected to Sing's divorced wife and good friend Lau Kwok Wai (Wong Chi Yin). Ching is shocked by the truth... Ching and Siu become very close, but on their wedding day, Siu suddenly goes missing. When she reappears, she is a changed person, and Ching has to cope with another loved one mysteriously changing... Little does he know, it's not quite her but someone genetically similar. Also in the process, Bernice and Kenneth's characters fall into a love triangle with Power, Rebecca Chan (Kenneth's older sister) and Benz Hui (Melissa's dad) have a romance after she dumps her 15-year married man affair.

== Cast ==
=== Main cast ===
Cast	Role	Description
Michael Miu	Ko Chung-Ching 高中正	Private Investigator Agency Owner; Ex-Police Officer; Lai Siu's lover.
Melissa Ng	Lai Siu 黎筱	Ko Chung-Ching's lover. Note: Mok Wai-Chi (莫慧姿) is Lai-Siu's twin.
Bernice Liu	Man Dai-Bo 萬大寶	Private Investigator; Koon Ching-Wan's girlfriend.
Kenneth Ma	Koon Ching-Wan 官青雲	Police Officer; Ko Chung-Ching's ex co-worker Man Dai-Bo's boyfriend.
Power Chan	Man Kai-Chiu (Super) 文啟超	Private Investigator; Ko Chung-Ching's younger cousin.
Vivien Yeo	Lam Yan-Yan 林欣欣	Private Investigator
Benz Hui	Lai Chau (LC) 黎秋	Lai Siu's stepfather. Koon Sau-Wah's boyfriend.
Rebecca Chan	Koon Sau-Wah 官秀華	Koon Ching-Wan's sister. Lai Chau's girlfriend.

=== Guest starring ===
Cast	Role	Description
Michelle Yim	Kong Lai-Ping 江麗萍	Kong Fai and Man Dai-Bo's mother.
Patrick Tang (鄧健泓)	Kong Fai 江輝	Pianist; Kong Lai-Ping's son. Man Dai-Bo's long lost brother.

=== Other cast ===
Cast	Role	Description
Ben Wong	Lau Kwok-Wai 劉國偉	Ko Chung-Ching's old colleague. Ho Kai-Man's lover.
Akina Hong (康華)	Ho Kai-Man (Winnie) 何綺文	Ko Chung-Ching's ex-wife. Lau Kwok-Wai's lover.
Felix Lok (駱應鈞)	Man Yung 萬勇	Man Dai-Bo's father.

== Viewership ratings ==
	Week	Episode	Average Points	Peaking Points	References
1	September 26–30, 2005	1 — 5	27	—	
2	October 3–7, 2005	6 — 10	27	—	
3	October 10–14, 2005	11 — 15	28	—	
4	October 17–21, 2005	16 — 20	29	—	
