= Hoyan Mok =

Hong Kong actress (born 1969)

- Mok in 2019
- Born: 8 October 1969 (age 56); Hong Kong
- Education: Basel Gewerbe Schule; Immunology and Molecular Biology (免疫与分子生物学) (in Switzerland)
- Years active: 1990s
- Spouse: Alex Fong (m. 2008)
- Children: Fu Ka-ching (b. 2008)

Chinese name
- Traditional Chinese: 莫可欣
- Simplified Chinese: 莫可欣
Transcriptions

Hoyan Mok (Chinese: 莫可欣) is a Hongkonger actress and beauty pageant titleholder. She won the 1993 Miss Hong Kong Pageant and worked as an actress for TVB in the 1990s. She was president of Wai Yin Association in 2009–2010. Mok is married to Alex Fong Chung-sun who is also a Hong Kong actor.

== Artistic career ==
In the 1993 Miss Hong Kong Pageant, Mok beat Kenix Kwok, who was considered a favourite to win, having won two side awards including Media's Favourite and Potential Artist. As Miss Hong Kong, she also competed at the Miss Universe 1994 pageant. She placed 45th at the pageant, same as her successor Halina Tam. Mok also competed at the Miss Chinese International Pageant 1994 where she made the top 10 only, becoming the first Miss Hong Kong to not place in the top 3.

Mok's victory in Miss Hong Kong caused controversy because local media pundits considered her "ugly" compared to her competitors and past Miss Hong Kong winners. It was widely believed that Run Run Shaw, the media mogul who founded TVB which hosted the pageant, disapproved of her.

She joined TVB as an actress following her Miss Hong Kong victory. Her front-stage career lasted five years, mainly in supporting roles.

== Personal life ==
Hoyan Mok began dating actor Alex Fong Chung-Sun in 1996. They married in 2008 and gave birth to their daughter later that year.

== Filmography ==
=== Film ===
- Enjoy Yourself Tonight 1997 (呢個乜嘢場)

=== TV series ===
- Untraceable Evidence (鑑證實錄)
- Detective Investigation Files II (刑事偵緝檔案 II)
- Armed Reaction (陀槍師姐)
- A Kindred Spirit (真情) as Rebecca
- A Road and A Will (香港人在廣州)

Achievements
Preceded by Emily Lo	Miss Hong Kong; 1993	Succeeded by Halina Tam
