= Detective Investigation Files IV =

- Detective Investigation Files IV Poster
- 刑事偵緝檔案IV
- Genre: Modern Drama
- Starring: Louis Koo; Sunny Chan; Jessica Hsuan; Charmaine Sheh; Lee San San
- Opening theme: "萬里陽光" ("10,000 Miles of Sunshine") by Edmond Leung
- Ending theme: "宇宙無限" ("Universe Unlimited") by Edmond Leung & Louis Koo
- Country of origin: Hong Kong
- Original language: Cantonese
- No. of episodes: 50

Production
- Producer: Poon Ka Tak
- Running time: approx. 45 minutes

Original release
- Network: Television Broadcasts Limited
- Release: March 29 – June 4, 1999

Related
- Detective Investigation Files I Detective Investigation Files II Detective Investigation Files III

Detective Investigation Files IV (Chinese: 刑事偵緝檔案IV) is the 4th and final installment of the Detective Investigation Files TV franchised by TVB in Hong Kong. It won two TVB Anniversary Awards, including Best Actor for Louis Koo and Best Actress for Jessica Hsuan.

The series focuses on the lives of two detectives, Tsui Fei (Louis Koo) and Kong Chi Shan (Sunny Chan), and the murder cases they deal with.

== Story ==
Because of his misbehavior, Tsui Fei (Louis Koo) is a sergeant sent to work with Senior Inspector Kong Tze Shan's (Sunny Chan) crime investigation team at the Hong Kong Central Police Station. He has been emotionally unstable since the disappearance of his girlfriend Leung Chin Chin (Anne Heung) three years earlier. At first, his attitude is not welcomed by the other officers, especially Hon Kwok Yan (Edmond So), but they soon get along. Fei and Tze Shan eventually become best friends.

While investigating his first murder case, Fei meets psychologist Quin Mo Chiu Kwan (Jessica Hsuan) and the two fall in love. Because Fei still misses his ex-girlfriend, the two frequently quarrel.

Tze Shan has a beautiful girlfriend, Man Yuen Lan (Charmaine Sheh), but Yuen Lan's best friend Tong Sum Yu (Lee San San) is also in love with him. Sum Yu tries hard to stop loving Tze Shan, until Yuen Lan's father Man Kwok Tai (Law Lok Lam) kills Leung Kim Hung (Kwok Fung) - Tze Shan's fellow officer and Chin Chin's brother - to frame an old enemy. Kwok Tai forces his daughter to assist him in his crime, but in the end, they are both captured and sent to prison. Yuen Lan gives Tze Shan up because of this.

Without Yuen Lan in the way, Sum Yu and Tze Shan quickly developed a relationship and even decided to marry. Yuen Lan has already been released from prison. Yuen Lan asked if they could have a chance to get back together. Tze Shan said he already hurt Yuen Lan, and Yuen Lan will always be in his heart. He can't hurt another person. Tze Shan still chooses Sum Yu, and Yuen Lan also accepts the truth. Meanwhile, Tze Shan's sister Kong Tze Ching (Maggie Siu) re-encounters her long-lost twin sister Tze Yiu (also played by Siu), but Tze Yiu turns out to be a lunatic and is involved in a murder case. Tze Ching tries to hide her, but she cannot stop her from attending Tze Shan's wedding. Tze Yiu's emotions were stable at first, but she suddenly had hallucinations of the man she murdered and tried to kill him with a knife. Unfortunately, her hallucinations appear right in front of Sum Yu, who is stabbed to death as a result. Tze Shan is devastated and tries to rekindle his relationship with Yuen Lan, but Yuen Lan has decided to leave for Yunnan. Deep down, Tze Shan likes Yuen Lan more, but he feels bad because of what his sister did.

Meanwhile, Chin Chin suddenly reappears, and Fei discovers that Chin Chin had been held captive by gangster Cheng Tung Shing (Roger Kwok) for all these years. Tung Shing was friends with Fei when Fei was an undercover in the triads, but their friendship turned to hatred when Fei revealed his identity. Tung Shing managed to escape and swore revenge against Fei. He kidnapped Chin Chin for future use. Finally, Tung Shing is defeated and sent to jail. Fei reluctantly breaks up with Quin as he feels he has owed Chin Chin way too much.

The last seconds of the show's finale hint that Quin has developed a relationship with Tze Shan.

== Cast ==
=== Leading Stars ===
- Louis Koo as Sergeant Tsui Fei
- Sunny Chan as Senior Inspector Kong Tze San
- Jessica Hester Hsuan as Quin Mo Chiu Kwan
- Charmaine Sheh as Man Yuen Lan
- Lee San San as Tong Sum Yu

=== Recurring Stars ===
- Maggie Shiu as Kong Tze Ching / Kong Tze Yiu
- Anne Heung as Leung Chin Chin
- Edmond So as Hon Kwok Yan
- Kwok Fung as Leung Kim Hung
- Eileen Yeow as Gigi Siu Chi Nam
- Rebecca Chan as Lau Lin Heung
- Andy Tai as Peter Yau Pei Tak
- Felix Lok as Mo Yuen Keung
- Edward Mok as Fung Tim Hoi
- Suet Nei as Tang Fong
- John Tang as Mo Kit
- Lee Sing Cheong as Chow Siu Kuen
- Wai Ka Hung as Wan Chi Sum

=== Notable Guest Stars ===
- Celine Ma as Man On Yee
- Michael Tse as Lau Sai Cheung
- Roger Kwok as Cheng Tung Sing
- Eddie Cheung as Lok Wai Kei
- Jojo Cho as Joe Yau Yau Lai Tai
- Fiona Yuen as Yuen Mei Mei
- Florence Kwok as Ceci Tin Sze Sze
- Timmy Hung as Hung Chi To
- May Kwong as Wah Po Ching
- Joe Ma as Alex Sung Ka Chai
- Wallis Pang as Sue Cheung Suk Yin
- Joyce Tang as Wan Chau Yuet
- Marco Ngai as Alan Wong Wai Lun
- Melissa Ng as Chow Yeuk Mui / Lam Wing Hang

== Legacy ==
Detective Investigation Files IV was shot with a whole new cast since the main stars of the original three installments, Michael Tao and Joey Leung, had left TVB. Nevertheless, it still became one of the highest-rated series in the territory in 1999 when it was aired for the first time.

Koo and Hsuan received the Favorite Actor and Actress Awards for the series in TVB's 32nd Anniversary respectively. Emilia's song Big Big World was featured in the show, and it became a great hit in Hong Kong during 1999 and 2000.

The VCD box set of Detective Investigation Files IV is now available for sale worldwide.

== The ending scene ==
This scene caused an uproar in Hong Kong, which later resulted in it being cut from overseas versions.

The scene takes place in a bar, where Mo Chiu Kwan is sitting watching soccer on TV. Tsui Fei walks into the bar, sees her and asks why she is here. She answers that there are more men here. Tsui then takes a call (possibly from Chin Chin), while a man walks over to Kwan in the background. Tsui Fei looks over, not knowing who the guy is and smiles. The guy whispers something in Kwan's ear and they laugh. then his face is revealed and it's Kong Tze Shan! Tsui Fei's expression changes immediately. Many viewers were unsure if the expression was a sign of jealousy or just surprise.

== Detective Investigation Files V? ==
Many people in Hong Kong were not satisfied with the ending of the series, when Tsui Fei left Mo Chiu Kwan for Leung Chin Chin, because they thought that he was responsible for the latter's suffering. TVB constantly receives requests to film the fifth in the series in which Tsui and Mo reunite, but so far there are no signs that it will happen.

The reason to this may be due to the loss of most of the original cast. Sunny Chan left TVB shortly after filming the series, and Lee San San also stopped acting. Louis Koo also turned to cinema and singing a few years later. Although Sunny Chan returned to TVB in 2004 (and even starred in a drama with Jessica Hsuan), the Detective Investigation Files phenomenon had already faded by that time. Meanwhile, Jessica Hsuan and Charmaine Sheh are still two of TVB's most popular actresses.
