= A Herbalist Affair =

2002 Hong Kong television series

- Promo poster
- 情牽百子櫃
- Genre: Modern drama Romance
- Written by: Kwan Chung Ling
- Starring: Roger Kwok; Charmaine Sheh; Melissa Ng; Eddy Ko; Bowie Wu; Angelina Lo; Derek Lee; Shirley Yim; Wong Wai
- Opening theme: Bitter Medicine (苦口良藥) by Andy Hui and Flora Chan
- Country of origin: Hong Kong
- Original language: Cantonese
- No. of episodes: 20

Production
- Producer: Lam Chi Wah
- Production locations: Hong Kong; China
- Camera setup: Multi camera
- Production company: TVB

Original release
- Network: TVB Jade
- Release: 11 March – 5 April 2002

A Herbalist Affair
- Traditional Chinese: 情牽百子櫃
- Simplified Chinese: 情牵百子柜
- Literal meaning: "Attachment to a Hundred Sub-cabinet"
Transcriptions
Standard Mandarin
- Hanyu Pinyin: Qíng Qiān Bǎi Zǐ Guì
Yue: Cantonese
- Jyutping: Cing4 Hin1 Baak3 Zi2 Gwai6

A Herbalist Affair is a 2002 Hong Kong modern serial drama produced by TVB and starring Roger Kwok, Charmaine Sheh and Melissa Ng. It was released overseas in December 2001, aired on TVB Jade from 11 March to 5 April 2002, and was re-aired in April 2006.

== Synopsis ==
A renowned Chinese medicine practitioner Cheung Si-Sung passed on his Chinese medicine shop to his son Wai-On after his wife died. Wai-On did not take good care of the shop and it lost its customers. Si-Sung’s grandson Yee-Fai works for a large Chinese medicine company. His enthusiasm attracts his colleague Sin-Yu, who does not want to work under her rich father. Yee-Fai is very careful with Sin-Yu as he thinks that she has been appointed to investigate him. Yee-Fai goes to Shanghai on business, and while there, he looks for an old friend of Si-Sung’s. Sin-Yu goes along with him as his secretary, and volunteers to help him fulfil his grandfather’s wish. Later, Yee-Fai meets Chinese medicine practitioner Geung Sum-Yu and Gook Yut-Siu. As Yee-Fai gets to know Yut-Siu better, they eventually work together in the medicine business.

== Cast ==
=== The Cheung family ===
Cast	Role	Description
Roger Kwok	Cheung Yee Fai 張二輝	Cheung See Sang's grandson Cheung Wai On's son Cheung Tai San's younger brother Kuk Yat Siu's older hal-brother Ng Sin Yu's ex-boyfriend Keung Sam Yuet's boyfriend
Ada Mui (梅素芳)	Liu Siu Man 廖子敏	Cheung See Sang's granddaughter in-law Cheung Wai On's daughter in-law Cheung Tai San's sister in-law
Bowie Wu	Cheung See Sang 張時生	Cheung Wai On's father Cheung Tai San, Cheung Yee Fai and Kuk Yat Siu's grandfather
Eddy Ko	Cheung Wai On 張懷安	Cheung See Sang's son Cheung Tai San, Cheung Yee Fai and Kuk Yat Siu's father
Shirley Yim (雪梨)	Cheung Tai San 張大珊	Cheung See Sang's granddaughter Cheung Wai On's daughter Cheung Yee Fai's older sister Kuk Yat Siu's older half-sister

=== The Ng family ===
Cast	Role	Description
Charmaine Sheh	Ng Sin Yu (Ruby) 吳倩如	Ng Sing's daughter Cheung Yee Fai's ex-girlfriend Chung Ching Lung's ex-wife
Yu Yeung (于洋)	Ng Sing 吳星	Ng Sin Yu's father
Henry Lo (魯振順)	Hong Chai 康齊	

=== The Keung family ===
Cast	Role	Description
Melissa Ng	Keung Sam Yuet 姜心悅	Keung Tit To's daughter Ng Sin Yu's good friend Ma Tat's ex-girlfriend Cheung Yee Fai's girlfriend
Wong Wai (王偉)	Keung Tit To 姜鐵圖	Keung Sam Yuet's father Kuk Lai Sa's good friend

=== The Kuk family ===
Cast	Role	Description
Angelina Lo (盧宛茵)	Kuk Lai Sa 谷麗莎	Cheung Wai On's lover Kuk Yat Siu's mother Fong Kau's mother in-law Keung Tit To's good friend
Derek Lee (李浩林)	Kuk Yat Siu 谷一宵	Kuk Lai Sa and Cheung Wai On's son Cheung See Sang's grandson Cheung Tai San and Cheung Yee Fai's younger brother in-law Fong Kau's husband
Eileen Yeow	Fong Kau 房姣	Kuk Lai Sa and Cheung See Sang's daughter in-law Kuk Yat Siu's wife

=== Other cast ===
Cast	Role	Description
Power Chan	Chow Chi Wah 周志華	Cheung Yee Fai's good friend
Mark Kwok	Chung Ching Lung 鍾正龍	Ng Sin Yu's ex-husband
Ku Feng	Tam Kwong Cheung 譚廣昌	Kuk Yat Siu's La mian teacher
Kwok Man Lung (郭文龍)	Ma Tat 馬達	Keung Sam Yuet's ex-boyfriend
