= Miss Chinese International Pageant 1994 =

- Date: January 23, 1994
- Presenters: Eric Tsang, Philip Chan
- Venue: TVB City, Hong Kong
- Broadcaster: TVB
- Entrants: 21
- Placements: 10
- Winner: Sui Pornnapa Saemin 沈玉翎; Bangkok, Thailand
- Congeniality: Marie Catherine Munoz 繆樂詩; Manila, Philippines

Miss Chinese International Pageant 1994 was held on January 23, 1994, in Hong Kong. The pageant was organized and broadcast by TVB in Hong Kong. Miss Chinese International 1993 Christy Chung crowned Saesim Pornapa Sui of Bangkok, Thailand as the winner.

== Pageant information ==
The theme of this year's pageant continues to be "The Traditions of the Dragon, The Embodiment of Beauty" 「龍的傳統 俏的化身」. The Masters of Ceremonies were Eric Tsang and Philip Chan.

== Results ==
Placement	Contestant	City Represented	Country Represented
Miss Chinese International 1994	Sui Pornnapa Saemin 沈玉翎	Bangkok	Thailand
1st Runner-Up	Diane Wang 王黛寧	New York City	USA
2nd Runner-Up	I-Man Chao 趙亦曼	Seattle	USA
Top 10 Finalists	Karen Lee 李真妮 (Carmen Aa) 劉美玉; Ho-Yan Mok 莫可欣; Leslie Law 羅美施; Virginia Long 龍薇燕; King-Mut Chan 陳敬密; Dianna Hong Wan 萬紫琳	Singapore; Johannesburg; Hong Kong; Montréal; Taipei; Macau; Los Angeles	Singapore; South Africa; Hong Kong; Canada; Chinese Taipei; Macau; USA

=== Special awards ===
- Miss Friendship: Marie Catherine Munoz 繆樂詩 (Manila)
- Miss Cool & Charming: Saesim Pornapa Sui 沈玉翎 (Bangkok)

== Contestant list ==
No.	Contestant Name	Represented City	Represented Country
1	Sui Pornnapa SAEMIN 沈玉翎	Bangkok	Thailand
2	Karen LEE 李真妮	Singapore	Singapore
3	Carmen AA 劉美玉	Johannesburg	South Africa
4	Jenny VANNES 珍麗	Tahiti	French Polynesia
5	Pei-Ching YEOH 楊佩君	Alor Setar	Malaysia
6	Mary TAN 譚玉梅	Quezon	Philippines
7	Luzviminda W. PAGUIO 王露茜	Calgary	Canada
8	(Wai-Yung CHAN) 陳慧容	Chicago	USA
9	Kimberly TAN 陳金金	Kota Kinabalu	Malaysia
10	I-Man CHAO 趙亦曼	Seattle	USA
11	Dianne WANG 王黛寧	New York City	USA
12	Marie Catherine MUNOZ 繆樂詩	Manila	Philippines
13	Ho-Yan MOK 莫可欣	Hong Kong	Hong Kong
14	Linh HUYNH 黃秋玲	Victoria	Canada
15	Leslie LAW 羅美施	Montréal	Canada
16	Virginia Y. WANG 王耀薇	San Francisco	USA
17	Virginia LUNG 龍薇燕	Taipei	Chinese Taipei
18	Annette CHAN 陳維歡	Vancouver	Canada
19	Balia CHAN 陳敬密	Macau	Macau
20	Dianna Hong WAN 萬紫琳	Los Angeles	USA
21	(Mei-Lin WONG) 黃美蓮	Auckland	New Zealand

== Crossovers ==
Contestants who previously competed or will be competing at other international beauty pageants:

Miss World

- 1993: Taipei, Chinese Taipei: Virginia Long
  (representing Republic of China)

Miss Universe

- 1994: Hong Kong: Hoyan Mok

Miss International

- 1992: Bangkok, Thailand: Sui Pornnapa Thepthinnakorn
  (representing Thailand)
