= Corinna Chamberlain =

Hong Kong singer and actress

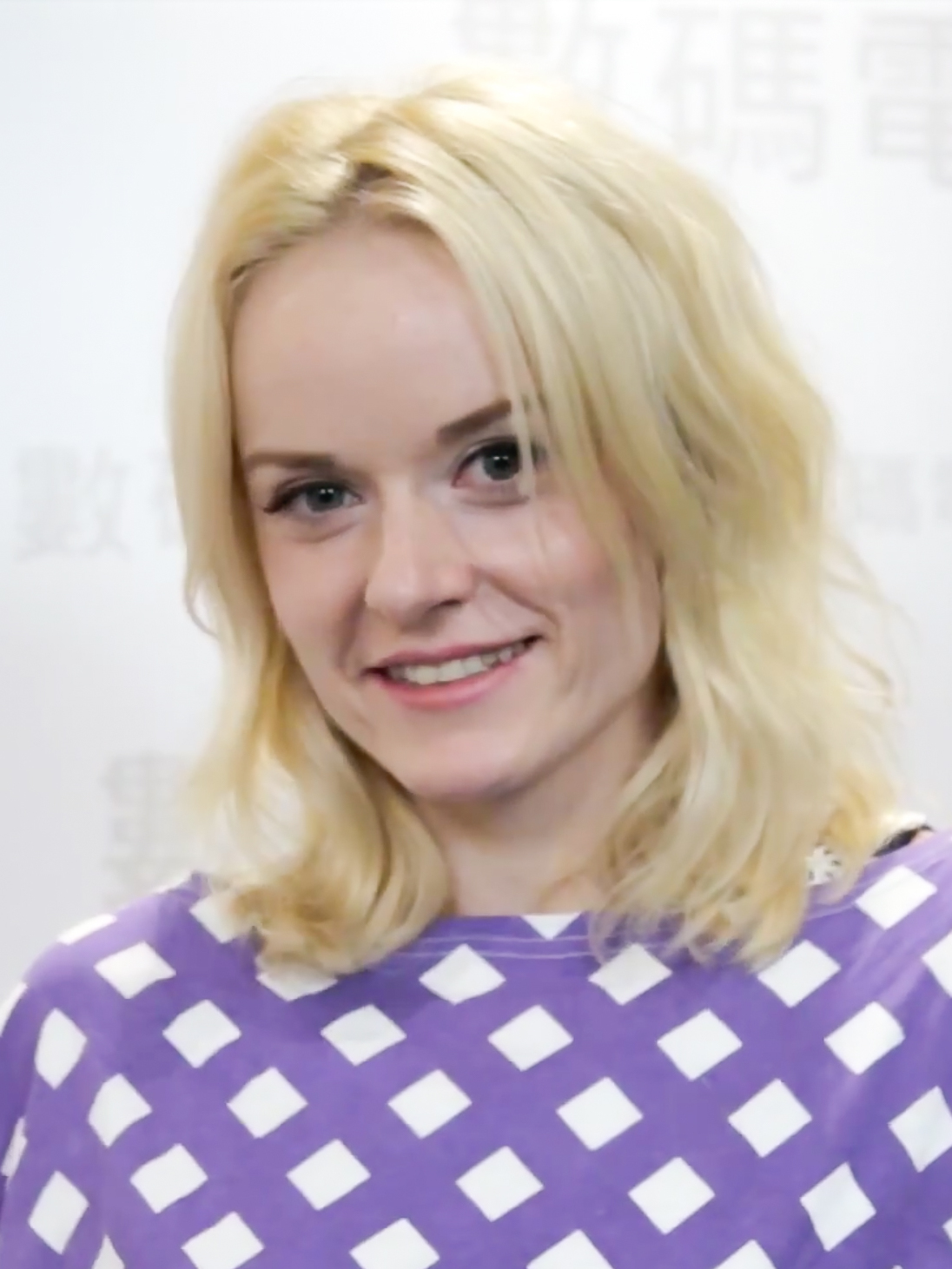
- Chamberlain in 2014
- Born: Corinna Kathy Chamberlain; British Hong Kong
- Occupations: Actress; singer; host
- Years active: 2007–present
- Spouse: Eddie Cheng (m. 2017)

Chinese name
- Traditional Chinese: 陳明恩
- Simplified Chinese: 陈明恩
Transcriptions
Standard Mandarin
- Hanyu Pinyin: Chén Míngēn
- Musical career
- Origin: Hong Kong
- Label: TVB

Corinna Kathy Chamberlain Cheng (Chinese: 陳明恩; Jyutping: Can4 Ming4 Jan1) is a New Zealand-Hong Kong singer and actress. She is also a musical theatre performer, model, and occasional television host for TVB. She was a director for the dance company, Morethandance until December 2008.

== Early life ==
Born to an Australian mother and a New Zealand father, she was raised in Hong Kong and speaks fluent Cantonese. Her family arrived in Hong Kong as missionaries. Her parents and older brother can also speak Cantonese fluently. Her older brother was also born and raised in Hong Kong, but has been living in Japan with his wife since 2009.

She is a Christian. Her Chinese name – "Ming Yan" means "understanding and grace".

== Career ==
Chamberlain graduated from the Hong Kong Academy of Performing Arts majoring in Musical Theatre Dance. She received The Society of APA Scholarship, Jackie Chan Charitable Foundation Scholarships (Outstanding Awards) and Sir Edward Youde Memorial Scholarship. She won first place in the duet section of Olympic 2000 competition that took her on tour in HK and Australia. She has worked as vocalist, dancer, actress, instructor, choreographer, model and MC. Corinna's musical performances include "Leaving" as Sally, "Vision Party" as B.B. Tang, "Disco Inferno" as Lady Marmalade, "The Boyfriend" as Masie, soloist for "Postcards From Broadway" with Michael Heath and Laurie Williamson, "And Then There’s You", "Annie" as Grace Farrell, and soloist in "Can’t Help It My Feet Love To Dance" and "Snowqueen". She has participated in numerous shows including "Side By Side", "On The Edge", "Yeah Show", Eternity's 20th Anniversary Concert, APM shows, Sandy Lam's 2007 Concert, "Q Zoo Zoo", "What’s Up The World", "R's Adventurous Drift" and many other commercial productions for companies including for Rene Martin, Hennessey, Adidas, Gucci and Miss Sixty.

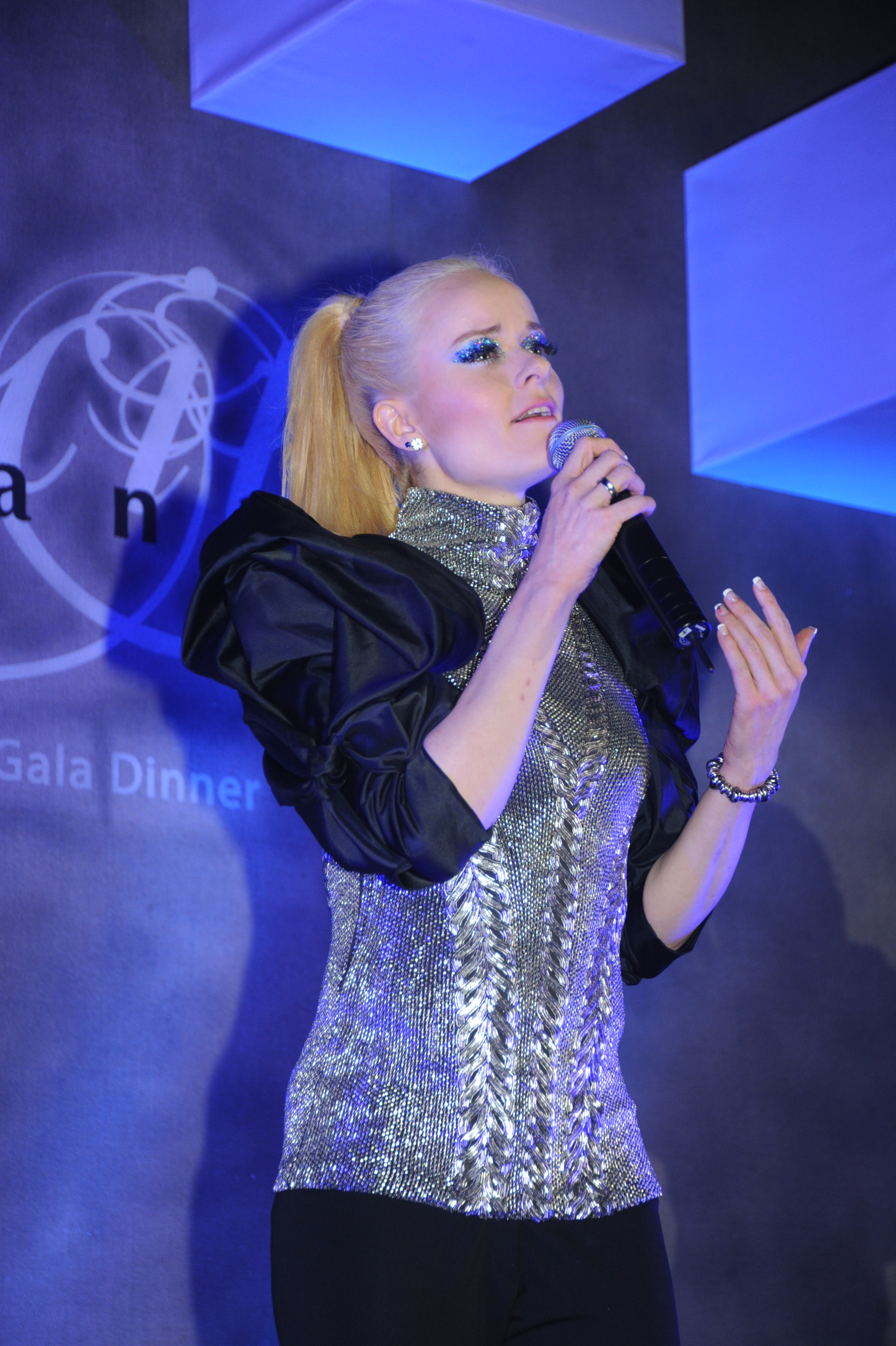
Chamberlain in 2011

Her choreographic work has included being assistant choreographer to Pewan Chau for Goodnews Communications International's musical, "Burning My Life 201", choreographer for the musical, "Moses", produced at United Christian College Kowloon East for Media Evangelism's musical, "An Ark Sparks in the Dark" and co-choreographer for Eternity's concert performance at Queen Elizabeth Stadium with Morethandance, for a dance performance at the release of Gucci's 2004 watch collection, for Millennium Centre's ETV production, for Tsang Shui Tim Secondary School's production of "The Sound of Music" and for Millennium Centre's primary school musical production. She has taught musical theatre jazz, lyrical jazz, pop jazz, modern jazz, song & dance, tap, and singing at places including CCDC, 3ami and numerous highschools.

Chamberlain is a TVB host as of May 2008. On 16 July 2008 she appeared in Best Selling Secrets, a popular TVB comedy soap opera, demonstrating her excellent Cantonese-speaking ability as well as good acting and martial arts skills.

Some viewers have likened her looks to British television host Terri Dwyer.

In 2008, she participated in William So's So I Sing concert series, and performed duets with him.

In 2008, she was the guest musician who sang both the Australian and New Zealand National Anthems at the Bledisloe Cup Rugby Game between Australia and New Zealand which was hosted by Hong Kong.

In August 2013, she became a contestant for TVB singing contest for actors, The Voice of the Stars (zh:星夢傳奇) and placed third.

== Personal life ==
Chamberlain married Eddy Cheng in Hong Kong in February 2017.

== Filmography ==
Year	Title	Role
2007	Best Selling Secrets	Nicole
2009	You're Hired	Annie Leung
2010	Every Move You Make	Angela
2012	Silver Spoon, Sterling Shackles	Sze Wai-nga
2013	Inbound Troubles	Cindy
2013	Bullet Brain	Joanna Rose
2014	Come On, Cousin	Mo Dik
2015	Limelight Years	Alice
2019	Flying Tiger 2	Tom
2019	I Love You, You’re Perfect, Now Change	Bride Chun

== Achievements ==
Year	Title	Place
2013	The Voice of the Stars	2nd runner up
