= Bullet Brain =

Hong Kong television series

- Genre: Period drama Fantasy
- Written by: Ip Kwong-yam
- Starring: Wayne Lai; Natalie Tong; Ngo Ka-nin; Edwin Siu; Lau Dan; Sire Ma
- Opening theme: "我的歷史" (My History) by Edwin Siu
- Country of origin: Hong Kong
- Original language: Cantonese
- No. of episodes: 25

Production
- Executive producer: Lee Tim-sing
- Production company: TVB

Original release
- Network: Jade, HD Jade
- Release: 8 April – 10 May 2013

Bullet Brain
- Traditional Chinese: 神探高倫布
- Simplified Chinese: 神探高伦布
- Literal meaning: "Great Detective Columbo"
Transcriptions
Yue: Cantonese
- Yale Romanization: San4 Taam3 Gou1 Lun4 Bou3
- Jyutping: San4 Taam3 Gou1 Leon4 Bou3

Bullet Brain (Chinese: 神探高倫布; lit. 'Great Detective Columbo') is a Hong Kong period fantasy television drama produced by TVB, starring Wayne Lai and Natalie Tong, with Lee Tim-sing serving as executive producer and Ip Kwong-yam serving as executive screenwriter. Produced at 25 episodes, the serial premiered on TVB Jade on 8 April 2013. It is set in British Hong Kong during the 1960s.

== Production and casting ==
With the working title of Detective Columbo, the sales presentation trailer of Bullet Brain was first revealed at TVB's Programme Presentation 2012 in November 2011. The trailer, which starred Wayne Lai, Louise Lee, Tavia Yeung, and Evergreen Mak, was the second to the last trailer to air at the event. In December 2011, Lee announced that Bullet Brain is slated to begin filming in May 2012, but remained tight-lipped on the other details of the production. However, due to the studio's decrease in staff capacity, Lee lost many of his creative directors and scriptwriters, which will affect the pace of production. He further added that the cast seen in Bullet Brain's presentation trailer are not confirmed to star, with the exception of Wayne Lai.

In March 2012, it was revealed that Niki Chow was in negotiations for a leading role. Chrissie Chau and Elanne Kwong were also considered. The role was ultimately given to Natalie Tong.

TVB hired executive scriptwriter Ip Kwong-yam to return to write for the drama, whose last production with TVB was the 1996 fantasy drama Journey to the West, also produced by Lee.

A costume press conference attended by the main cast was held on 2 May 2012. Shooting officially commenced on 10 May 2012 in Hong Kong. A blessing ceremony was held on 7 June 2012, and filming officially ended on 15 August 2012.

== Main cast ==
- Wayne Lai as Ko Tai-hei (高大喜) / Probationary Inspector Columbo Ko (高倫布), PI6092:

The serial's main character, a brilliant but cold-blooded detective from the Hong Kong Police Force (HKPF). Born Ko Tai-hei, Columbo was originally an innocent and simple-minded farmer from the outskirts of mainland China. Under the recommendation of Louis Kim, the Secretary for Security, Tai-hei is recruited to the Hong Kong Police Force to become a police constable. After recovering from a bullet to the head, Tai-hei's temperament suffers a dramatic change — his IQ rises from 100 to 283, and his emotional capacity is almost entirely destroyed.

Lai was the first of the cast to be confirmed in December 2011. Lai also filmed for the drama's sales presentation trailer, which was revealed at TVB's Programme Presentation 2012 in November 2011. The character is loosely inspired by Columbo from the self-titled American crime fiction series.

- Natalie Tong as Mui Mui (梅妹) and Szeto Nam (司徒男):

Mui Mui is Tai-hei's first love, a materialistic peasant girl who leaves the countryside to marry a wealthy heir in the city. Her husband turns out to be abusive and locks her in a well for three years, leading Mui Mui to develop a psychological disorder. She manages to escape and encounters Tai-hei, now known as the legendary Columbo. She immediately regrets her initial decision in leaving him twenty years ago and attempts to win his heart back. Szeto Nam is Mui Mui's 17-year-old daughter, who works as a courtesan.

Tong was the second of the cast to be confirmed in February 2012. Originally signed to play a supporting role, Lee changed Tong's role to a leading character when other actresses could not sign for the part.

== Recurring cast ==
- Ngo Ka-nin as Sergeant Pau Ping-on (包平安), SGT5641:

A HKPF detective sergeant. Concerning and loyal, the British-born Ping-on was Tai-hei's best friend. Ping-on was the reason why Tai-hei injured his head and became Columbo, an incident that Ping-on never forgave himself for. When Ping-on tries to bring back the old Tai-hei, another accident happens.

Ngo's addition to the cast was revealed on 29 March 2012.

- Edwin Siu as Choi Fei-lung (蔡飛龍), PC9527:

A HKPF police constable, and Eva's direct subordinate. Talented, intelligent, and shrewd, Fei-lung graduated at the top his class and is the subject of envy among his peers. He was originally chosen by the Secretary to aid Eva in her mission to investigate Columbo, but is later ordered by the Superintendent to spy on both Columbo and Eva.

It was reported that Siu was cast in March 2012. In 2008, Siu was in final negotiations to film Lee's award-winning drama Rosy Business, but had to withdraw because he was unable to shave his head, which was required for his role in Rosy Business. Siu reportedly rejected a high-paying production in order to accommodate his schedule to film Bullet Brain.

- Lau Dan as Choi Tin (蔡田):

The father of Fei-lung and a retired police officer. Tin practiced blackmailing during his career with the police force, which indirectly led to the death of his wife. Fei-lung never forgave Tin for this.

- Sire Ma as Inspector Eva Kim (金伊娃), WIP9528:

A HKPF detective inspector. Eva is the daughter of Louis Kim, the Secretary for Security, and was trained at the New Scotland Yard. She is ordered by her father and the Internal Affairs to investigate Columbo, but finds herself falling hopelessly in love with Columbo's manipulative charms.

Ma was the fourth of the cast to be confirmed on 16 March 2012.

- Brian Burrell as Superintendent Edward Scott (史葛):

The HKPF Superintendent of Police who was once the headmaster of the Hong Kong Police Cadet School. Cunning and thirsty for power, Scott's goals are clear and he plans to overthrow Louis as the Head of Security. Scott was never fond of Columbo, as he sees him as an obstacle in achieving his goal. Determined to get rid of both Louis and Columbo, Scott orders Fei-lung to spy on Columbo and Eva.

- Joe Junior as Secretary for Security, Louis Kim (金路易):

The Secretary for Security. Louis was a friend of Tai-hei's father Ngau, whom he met in the concentration camps during the Japanese occupation of Hong Kong. After Ngau's death, Louis recruits his son, the childlike Tai-hei, into the Hong Kong Police Force as a gesture of gratitude. After Tai-hei is shot in the head and becomes the ruthless Columbo, Louis begins to fear Columbo and his power. Deemed to be dangerous, he sends his adopted daughter, Eva, to investigate Columbo and hand-picks Fei-lung to aid her in the investigation.

- Corinna Chamberlain as Joanna Rose: Ping-on's wife.
- Devily Leung as Pun Shuk-han (潘淑嫻): Fei-lung's eventual love interest.

== Reception ==
=== Ratings ===
The premiere episode received an average rating of 28 points, at approximately 1.79 million live viewers in Hong Kong.

== Viewership ratings ==
Week	Episodes	Date	Average Points	Peaking Points
1	01－05	April 8–12, 2013	26	28
2	06－10	April 15–19, 2013	26	
3	11－15	April 22–26, 2013	23	
4	16－20	April 29 - May 3, 2013	22	
5	21－25	May 6–10, 2013	24	28

=== Critical response ===
Bullet Brain received mostly negative reviews. On Douban, the drama received a rating of 3.9 out of 10 based on over 1000 votes. Mingpao reported that many viewers found the excessive story-telling of Bullet Brain "too drawn out and boring." As of May 2013, Bullet Brain is TVB's lowest-rated serial drama of the year, raking in only an average of 1.55 million viewers.

Lee Tim-sing responded that although the Chinese title 神探高倫布( literally "Great Detective Columbo" ) is a knockoff of the true mystery crime series Columbo, audience should not preconceive the show as a mystery series. He said that Bullet Brain is a drama centered around Ko Tai-hei and Mui Mui, in which the theme is focused on human nature and the love between Ko Tai-hei and Mui Mui.

== See also ==
- Columbo
