= Lee San-san =

Hong Kong model

Lee San-San
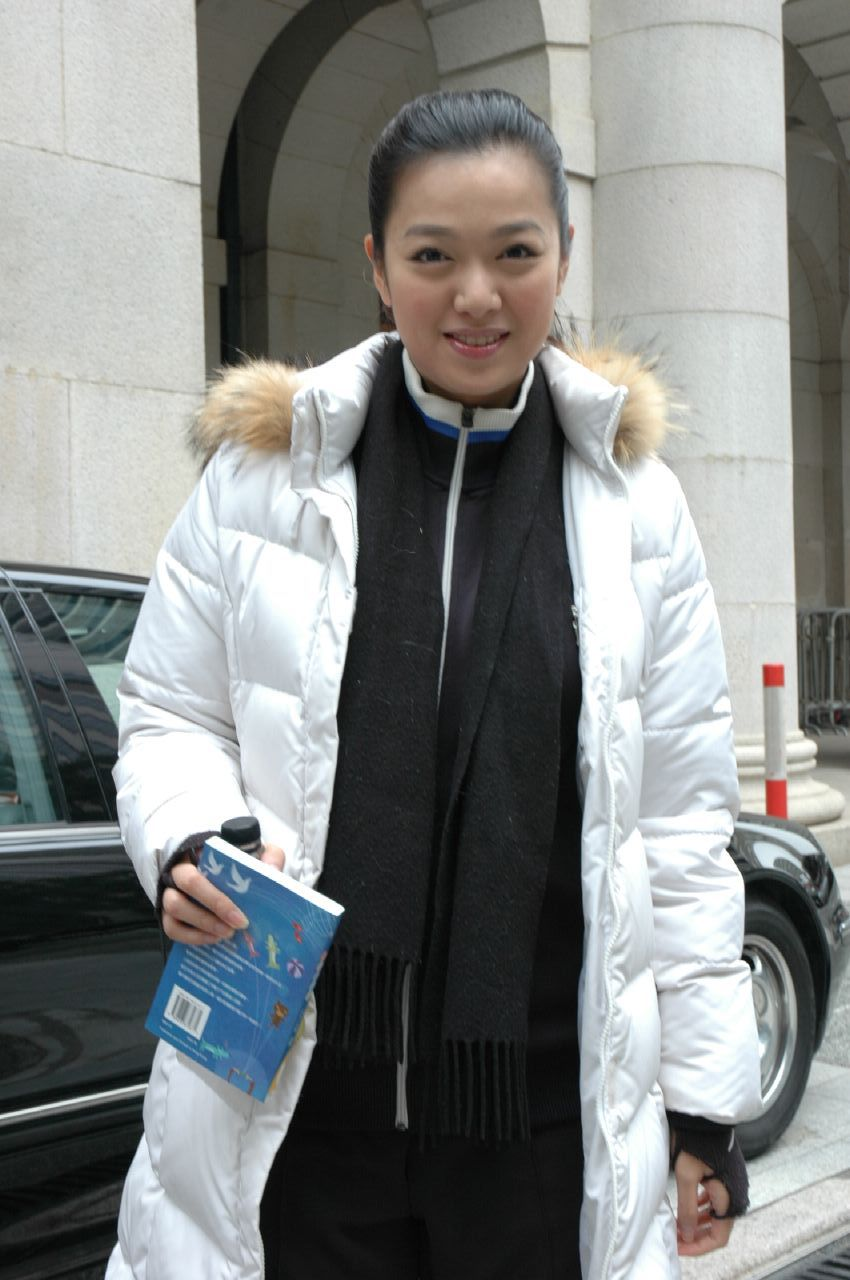
- Born: 9 October 1977 (age 48); Hong Kong

Chinese name
- Traditional Chinese: 李珊珊
- Simplified Chinese: 李珊珊
Transcriptions

Lee San-San (Chinese: 李珊珊) (born 9 October 1977) is Hongkonger actress and beauty pageant titleholder who the winner of the 1996 Miss Hong Kong Pageant and her territory's representative at Miss Universe 1997. Lee placed 45th at that pageant like former Miss Hong Kongs, Mok Hoi Yan and Halina Tam. She also competed at the Miss Chinese International 1997, pageant where she finished 2nd. She signed with TVB, and starred in various Hong Kong television dramas, before leaving the network. She is a Hakka of Meixian ancestry.

== Television ==
- Untraceable Evidence (1997)
- Burning Flame (1998)
- Detective Investigation Files IV (1999)
- Untraceable Evidence 2 (1999)
- Man's Best Friend (1999)
- Aiming High (2000)
- The Monkey King: Quest for the Sutra (2002)
- The Unbeatables 3 (2002) as Jiang Yexue

Achievements
Preceded by Winnie Yeung	Miss Hong Kong; 1996	Succeeded by Virginia Yung
