= Fantasy Hotel =

- Fantasy Hotel poster
- 開心賓館
- Genre: Modern Drama
- Starring: Michael Tao; Melissa Ng; Wayne Lai; Michael Tong
- Opening theme: "再高一線" by Michael Tong
- Country of origin: Hong Kong
- Original language: Cantonese
- No. of episodes: 20

Production
- Producer: Lee Tim-shing
- Running time: 45 minutes (approx.)

Original release
- Network: TVB
- Release: July 4 – July 29, 2005

Fantasy Hotel (Traditional Chinese: 開心賓館) is a TVB modern drama series broadcast in July 2005.

== Synopsis ==
Hong Kong's top tour guide
Experience the ups and downs of life in a hotel

There are three tour guides, Kam Ji-Kit (Michael Tao), Yung Ka-Man (Melissa Ng), and Hon Shan (Wayne Lai) lead tours from mainland China. One day, unexpectedly, a friend Kam Kong-Hoi (Wu Fung), gives them his hotel to take care of. Suddenly, the three are bosses and need to improve the hotel for the sake of their friend. Along the way, Ka-Man develops feelings for Ji-Kit, but because of a misunderstanding, she tries to stop her growing feelings for him. When Ji-Kit eventually finds out how Ka-Man feels towards him, he tries to court her but Ka-Man is too afraid of getting hurt.

== Cast ==
Cast	Role	Description
Michael Tao	Kam Ji-Kit (Bob) 甘志傑	Tour Guide; Yung Ka-Man's lover.
Melissa Ng	Yung Ka-Man 翁家文	Tour Guide; Kam Ji-Kit's lover.
Wayne Lai	Hon Shan 韓山	Tour Guide; Chan Kiu-Choh's husband.
Michael Tong	Ko Cheung 高祥	
Wu Fung	Kam Kong-Hoi 金廣開	Golden Hotel Owner
Angela Tong	Chan Kiu-Choh 陳翹楚	Hon Shan's wife.
Devily Leung	Dong Nei 冬妮	Movie Star; Kam Ji-Kit's friend.
Ben Wong	Au Nga-Lik 歐雅歷	Yung Ka-Man's ex-husband.
Celine Ma (馬蹄露)	Cheung Suk-Han 張淑嫻	Hotel Clerk

== Viewership ratings ==
	Week	Episode	Average Points	Peaking Points	References
1	July 4–8, 2005	1 — 5	29	—	
2	July 11–15, 2005	6 — 10	30	—	
3	July 18–22, 2005	11 — 15	31	—	
4	July 25–29, 2005	16 — 20	29	—	
