= Heavenly In-Laws =

- Poster
- 我外母唔係人
- Genre: Period Drama
- Starring: Nancy Sit; Joey Leung; Linda Chung; Yuen Wah
- Opening theme: "外母大人" by Nancy Sit & Joey Leung
- Country of origin: Hong Kong
- Original language: Cantonese
- No. of episodes: 20

Production
- Running time: 45 minutes (approx.)

Original release
- Network: TVB

Heavenly In-Laws (Chinese: 我外母唔係人) is a TVB drama series released overseas in January 2007 and aired on TVB Pay Vision Channel in July 2007.

== Cast ==
Cast	Role	Description
Nancy Sit (薛家燕)	Lo Fa 魯花	Fat Flower; Flower Queen; Ji Mei's mother Ding Sun's Mother-In-Law
Linda Chung (鍾嘉欣)	Ji Mei 紫薇	Flower Princess; Lo Fa's daughter Ding Sun's wife Lam Sui's Daughter-In-Law; Ding Yau and Ding Yun's Sister-In-Law
Yuen Wah (元華)	Lum Sui 林水	Water God; Sui Hing; Ding Yau, Ding Sun, and Ding Yun's godfather Ji Mei's Father-In-Law
Joey Leung (梁榮忠)	Ding Sun 丁辰	Ding Yau's younger brother Ding Yun's older brother Ji Mei's husband Lo Fa's Son-In-Law; Tin Man Lei's ex-boyfriend Lum Sui's godson
Rain Lau (劉玉翠)	Ding Yau 丁酉	Ding Sun and Ding Yun's older sister Ji Mei's Sister-In-Law; Lum Sui's goddaughter
Oscar Chan (陳堃)	Ding Yun 丁寅	Ding Yau, Ding Sun's younger brother Ji Mei's Brother-In-Law; Lum Sui's godson
Chun Wong (秦煌)	Cheng Choi 鄭財	Gum Fung's husband Cheng Sau Fu and Cheng Sau Yip's father
Mary Hon (韓馬利)	Gum Fung 金鳳	Cheng Choi's wife Cheng Sau Yip's mother Cheng Sau Fu's stepmother
Joel Chan (陳山聰)	Cheng Sau Yip 鄭守業	George; Gum Fung's Son; Cheng Sau-Fu's step brother Ji Mei's boss
Wong Cho Lam (王祖藍)	Cheng Sau Fu 鄭守富	Ding Yau's lover Cheng Sau Yip's step brother Ji Mei's God brother
Winnie Yeung (楊婉儀)	Tin Man Lei 田曼莉	Rotten Pear; Ding Sun's ex-girlfriend Cheng Sau Yip's girlfriend Hoi Goh's wife
Savio Tsang (曾偉權)	Hoi Goh 海哥	Tin Man Lei's husband
Fung So Boh (馮素波)	Lai Ma 奶媽	Hoi Goh's mother Tin Man Lei's Milk Mom
Lee Kwok Lun (李國麟)	Yee Long Sun 二郎神	Yee Goh; Water God's buddy Say Goh; Cheng Sau Yip's biological father
Anita Kwan (關伊彤)	LuLu 露露	Cheng Sau Yip's employee Crush on Peter (Ding Sun)
June Chan (陳琪)	Ah Lai 阿麗	Ji Mei's florist employee
