= Detective Investigation Files II =

- 刑事偵緝檔案 II
- Genre: Police procedural drama
- Starring: Michael Tao; Joey Leung; Kenix Kwok; Louisa So; Amy Kwok; Joseph Lee; Sammi Cheng
- Opening theme: 為明日爭氣 by Edmond Leung
- Ending theme: 愛與情 by Edmond Leung; 愛的挽歌 by Sammi Cheng
- Country of origin: Hong Kong
- Original language: Cantonese
- No. of episodes: 40

Production
- Producer: Poon Ka Tak
- Running time: approx. 45 minutes

Original release
- Network: Television Broadcasts Limited
- Release: December 11, 1995 – February 2, 1996

Related
- Detective Investigation Files; Detective Investigation Files III Detective Investigation Files IV

Detective Investigation Files II is a 40-episode 1995 Hong Kong TVB detective drama. It is the second installment in the Detective Investigation Files Series and was aired roughly eight months after the first series concluded. Michael Tao, Joey Leung, Kenix Kwok and Louisa So reprise their roles from the original series, along with new cast members Amy Kwok, Joseph Lee and Sammi Cheng. This series featured twelve cases.

== Synopsis ==
Detective Investigation Files II is a 40-episode 1995 Hong Kong TVB detective drama. It is the second installment in the Detective Investigation Files Series and was aired roughly eight months after the first series concluded. Michael Tao, Joey Leung, Kenix Kwok and Louisa So reprise their roles from the original series, along with new cast members Amy Kwok, Joseph Lee and Sammi Cheng. This series featured twelve cases. Tai Yung (Michael Tao Tai-Yu) and Jesse's (Kenix Kwok Ho-Ying) relationship went on really well until Michael's colleague Carmen (Amy Kwok Oi Ming) fell in love with Tai Yung. She is a bit mentally unstable, due to some incidents that have happened to her before when she was in U.K. In one case she got injured trying to save Tai Yung. Tai Yung, as nice as he always is, did everything to help her recover. Everyone with some TV-watching experience can imagine what this may have caused to Tai Yung's and Jessie's relationship. They break up and Carmen took the opportunity to get near Tai Yong, but they never formally get together.

== Cast ==
=== Tseung Kwan O Police Station ===
Actor	Role	Description
Michael Tao	Cheung Tai Yung (張大勇)	張Sir、勇哥、大勇; Newly promoted Inspector; Detective, Jessie's boyfriend, Gigi and Chung Yi's best friend, Carmen's ex-boyfriend
Joey Leung	Lee Chung Yi (李忠義)	義仔; Newly promoted Sergeant Detective Tai Yung's subordinate and best friend, Gigi's husband
Amy Kwok	Nam Ka Man (藍嘉文)	Carmen、文文; Originally named Rachel; Detective; Lam Ka Wing's sister Suffered from memory loss while studying in England; Cheung Tai Yung's ex-girlfriend Resigned in episode 30; Left Hong Kong and returned to England in episode 31
Joseph Lee	Nam Ka Wing (藍嘉永)	永哥; Canteen cook Carmen's older brother Killed Ling Nga Sze and Lo Po Hong in England; Died in episode 30
Yvonne Lam	Lui Chiu Fung (雷肖鳳)	Madam Lui; Chief Inspector; Superior of Tai Yung, Chung Yi, Carmen, Fan, Kau
Carrie Ho	Mo Tak Fan (毛德芬)	芬女; Detective; Tai Yung's subordinate
Ip Chun Sing	Man Chun Kau/Man Chi Fai (孟振球/孟志輝)	孟波; Detective; Tai Yung's subordinate
Evergreen Mak	Fong Chiu Wing (方昭榮)	Vincent、方Sir; Forensic pathologist
Deno Cheung	Biu (阿標)	Detective; Tai Yung's subordinate

=== Ko family ===
Actor	Role	Description
So Hang Suen	Chu Sau Kuen (朱秀娟)	Jessie and Ko Man's mother, Kan Tong Tong's grandmother
Kenix Kwok	Ko Chit (高婕)	Jessie、「細妹」 Reporter, Tai Yung's girlfriend, later wife Suffered from memory loss in episode 39
Maggie Chan	Ko Man (高敏)	Jessie's older sister, Kan Tong Tong's mother

=== Lee family ===
Actor	Role	Description
Joey Leung	Lee Chung Yi (李忠義)	See#Tseung Kwan O Police Station
Louisa So	Yung Kam Chi (容金枝)	Gigi、阿枝; Bartender, Tai Yung's best friend Chung Yi's wife Died in episode 31

=== Nam Family ===
Actor	Role	Description
Amy Kwok	Nam Ka Man (藍嘉文)	See#Tseung Kwan O Police Station
Joseph Lee	Nam Ka Wing (藍嘉永)	See#Tseung Kwan O Police Station

=== Cheung Family ===
Actor	Role	Description
Lau Dan	Cheung Pak Chuen (張百川)	Cheung Tai Yung and Cheung Siu Yau's father
Michael Tao	Cheung Tai Yung (張大勇)	See#Tseung Kwan O Police Station
Merry Birchfield	Cheung Siu Yau (張小柔)	Cheung Pak Chuen's Daughter; Cheung Tai Yung's half sister

=== Others ===
Actor	Role	Character
Sammi Cheng	Yip Chi Ching (葉子晴)	Ivy; Fashion designer Cheung Tai Yung's classmate Appeared in episode 31; Involved in Case 10 and Case 11 as a victim

== Cases ==
=== Case 1：Death by Perfume (Episode 1-4) ===
Actor	Role	Description
Joseph Yeung	Lau Yeuk Sat	Joseph; Doctor; Sexual assault and murder suspect Killed by Tong Ka Chai in episode 3
Gordon Lam	Tong Ka Chai	Doctor; Ho Bik San's husband Raped and murdered girls who used Envy perfume Tried to kill Carmen; Arrested in episode 4
Josephine Lam	Ho Bik San	Tong Ka Chai's wife John's secret lover Gave birth to a son through John
Lee Lung Kei	John	Rich tycoon Ho Bik San's secret lover

=== Case 2: The Burned Corpse (Episode 4-6) ===
Actor	Role	Description
Man Kit Wan	Cho Siu Ching (曹兆貞)	Requested Jessie's help in episode 4 Supposed murderer Burned to death by Ma Seng Cheung
Sher Ng	Yuen Tin Lai (袁天麗)	Supposed victim Ma Seng Cheung's mistress Almost got murdered by Ma Seng Cheung
Newton Lai	Ma Seng Cheung (馬成昌)	General Manager of a big corporation Yip Hung's husband Yuen Tin Lai's secret lover Burned Cho Siu Ching to death Poisoned to death by Yip Hung in episode 6
Lily Li	Yip Hung (葉紅)	Ma Seng Cheung's wife Poisoned Ma Seng Cheung in episode 6 Turned herself in during episode 6

=== Case 3: Mysterious Resurrection (Episode 7-9) ===
Actor	Role	Description
Bessie Chan	Chau Lai Ho (周麗荷)	Daisy; Famous fashion designer Disappeared from her hometown 5 years ago and was thought to be murdered by Lam Tin Sang
Wong Kai Tak	Lam Tin Sang (林天生)	Used to pursue Daisy; Thought to be Daisy's murderer Died 5 years ago
Ben Wong	Lee Hon Keung (李漢强)	Daisy's friend Killed Lam Tin Sang 5 years ago Arrested in episode 9

=== Case 4: A Kidnap Within A Kidnap (Episode 10-12) ===
Actor	Role	Description
Gordon Liu	Ching Kan (程根)	Police; Cheung Tai Yung's senior Kidnapped Chiu Ka Chun after his own son was kidnapped Turned himself in in episode 12

=== Case 5: Seven Years Ago... (Episode 13-15) ===
Actor	Role	Description
Evergreen Mak	Fong Chiu Wing (方昭榮)	Vincent、方 Sir; Forensics expert Fong Chiu Wai's older brother
Law Lan	Sung Kam Lan (宋金蘭)	Fong Chiu Wing and Fong Chiu Wai's mother
Jessica Chau	Fong Chiu Wai/Wai Chiu Fong (方昭惠/惠昭芳)	Sung Kam Lan's daughter Fong Chiu Wing's younger sister Raped by To Chung Leung 7 years ago Killed To Chung Leung; Admitted to killing To Chung Leung in episode 15 but was not charged for murder due to lack of evidence
Astrid Chan	Mak Hiu Yan (麥曉欣)	Social worker Fong Chiu Wing's girlfriend, later wife
Fong Kit	To Chung Leung (杜忠良)	Sung Kam Lan's partner Raped Fong Chiu Wai and was killed 7 years ago

=== Case 6: Death Warning (Episode 16-19) ===
Actor	Role	Description
Cheung Kwok Keung	Tse Fung	A famous actor, Ko Man's ex-fiancé, Choi Tzi Sau's ex homosexual partner. Killed by Choi Tzi Sau in episode 17
Lee Ka Keung	Choi Tzi Sau	Tse Fung's manager and ex-partner. Used Ko Man to shoot Tse Fung to death in episode 17. Shot to death by the police in episode 19

=== Case 7: The Lady in Red (Episode 20-22) ===
Actor	Role	Description
Andy Tai	Kwan A Lun (關亞倫)	Hairdresser; Chan Siu Lik's business partner Yiu Mei Bo's husband Killed by Yiu Mei Bo and Si Suk Kwan in episode 22
Dickson Li	Chan Siu Lik (陳少力)	Hairdresser; Kwan A Lun's business partner Si Suk Kwan's lover
Jojo Cho	Si Suk Kwan (施淑君)	Kwan A Lun's mistress Yiu Mei Bo's high school classmate Conspired with Yiu Mei Bo to murder Kwan A Lun; Arrested in episode 22
Bonnie Ngai	Yiu Mei Bo (姚美寶)	Kwan A Lun's wife Si Suk Kwan's high school classmate Conspired with Si Suk Kwan to murder Kwan A Lun; Arrested in episode 22

=== Case 8: A Mother's Love (Episode 23-26) ===
Actor	Role	Description
Rebecca Chan	Yeung Hiu Ching	Betty; Prostitute; Tung Tung's mother Poisoned Tsang Bak Nin; Threatened by Tsang Tzi Kai; Committed suicide in episode 25
Cheung Ying Choi	Tsang Bak Nin	Hotel CEO; Poisoned by Betty under orders from Tsang Tzi Kai
Au Siu Wai	Tsang Tzi Kai	Hotel manager Tsang Bak Nin's nephew Threatened Betty; Died from illness in episode 26

=== Case 9: Unwanted Memories (Episode 27-30) ===
Actor	Role	Description
Kitty Chung	Ling Cho Sze (凌祖絲)	JoJo; Jessie's colleague Ling Nga Sze's younger sister Killed by Nam Ka Wing in episode 27
Akina Hong	Ling Nga Sze (凌雅絲)	Alice; Ling Cho Sze's older sister Carmen's love rival Killed by Nam Ka Wing 4 years ago

=== Case 10: Sisters Reunion (Episode 31-33) ===
Actor	Role	Description
Eddie Cheung	Wong Chi To	Chau Wing Lam's husband Chau Wing Yan's brother-in-law and secret lover Ivy's ex-lover Conspired with Chau Wing Yan to murder Chau Wing Lam; Poisoned by Chau Wing Yan in episode 32
Michelle Fung	Chau Wing Lam	Wong Chi To's wife Chau Wing Yan's older sister Murdered by Wong Chi To
Amy Cheung	Chau Wing Yan	Chau Wing Lam's younger sister Conspired with Wong Chi To to murder Chau Wing Lam; Killed Gigi in episode 31 by knocking her down with a car Arrested in episode 33

=== Case 11: The Tuen Muk Tze Mystery (Episode 34-37) ===
Actor	Role	Description
Jessie Chan	Tuen Muk Tze (端木紫)	Hong Bo Kei's lesbian lover Rape victim Committed suicide
Shirley Yim	Hong Po Kei (康寶琪)	Chris; Duen Muk Tze's lesbian lover Killed Duen Muk Tze's rapist (Kwok Chi Nam); Committed Suicide in Episode 37

=== Case 12: Medical Blunders (Episode 37-40) ===
Actor	Role	Description
Kong Hon	Ngai Pok Yin (倪博彥)	Hospital director Wong Chung Sun's father-in-law Killed by Chau Wing Kin in episode 38
Jim Ping Hei	Wong Chung Sun (王忠信)	Doctor; Ngai Pok Yin's son-in-law Shelly's secret lover Killed by Chau Wing Kin in episode 38
Teresa Mak	Lam Choi Nei (林采妮)	Shelly; Nurse; Jessie's high school classmate Wong Chung Sun's secret lover Killed by Chau Wing Kin in episode 37
Marco Ngai	Chau Wing Kin (周永健)	大舊; Lai Mei Yin's husband Cheung Tai Yung and Ho Seng Choi's schoolmate Killed Shelly, Ngai Pok Yin, Wong Chung Sun and Ho Seng Choi; Framed Ho Seng Choi for the murders Arrested in episode 39
Natalie Wong	Lai Mei Yin (黎美賢)	Chau Wing Kin's wife Diagnosed as cancer patient by Ngai Pok Yin and Wong Chung Sun and was used as a test subject Died in episode 39
Wayne Lai	Ho Seng Choi (何成材)	奀仔; Cheung Tai Yung and Chau Wing Kin's schoolmate Killed by Chau Wing Kin in episode 39

== See also ==
- Detective Investigation Files Series
