= Life Begins at Forty (2003 TV series) =

- Promo poster
- 花樣中年
- Genre: Romance, Comedy, Drama
- Created by: Marco Law Wing-Yin (羅永賢)
- Starring: Alex Fong; Charmaine Sheh; Chin Ka Lok; Anne Heung; Ram Chiang; Shirley Yeung
- Country of origin: Hong Kong
- Original language: Cantonese
- No. of episodes: 20

Production
- Producer: Marco Law Wing-Yin (羅永賢)
- Running time: 45 minutes (approx.)

Original release
- Network: TVB
- Release: December 22, 2003 – January 16, 2004

Life Begins At Forty is a TVB series in 20 episodes. It stars Alex Fong, Chin Ka Lok, and Ram Tseung as three men in their forties and the issues they face as they enter middle age. Each has a story of their own but interconnects with the other two main characters.

== Plot ==
Wei Fuk Wing, AKA "Ray", works at an advertising company called AW and has a contentious relationship with his new colleague, Kelly Kwan. Eventually, they fall in love and begin a relationship.

Chan Bing Gei was married, but his wife left several years ago. He runs a cram school and has unconditional, promiscuous sex with girls he meets at bars. Gei takes in a girl who claims to be his long-lost daughter Tung Tung and falls in love with his ex-wife's cousin.

Lo Ga Fai, an actor with small roles and big dreams, comes from a rich family and is bisexual. After his longtime boyfriend breaks up with him, Fai meets movie star Mok Hui Nam and they fall in love. Then Nam becomes pregnant with another man's baby and Fai discovers he has brain cancer. Not wanting to be a burden to them, Fai rejects his love for Nam and her baby.

== Main cast ==
- Alex Fong (方中信) as Wei Fuk Wing 韋福榮
- Charmaine Sheh (佘詩曼) as Kwan Tze Kei 關子琪
- Chin Ka Lok (錢嘉樂) as Chan Bing Gei 陳炳基
- Anne Heung (向海嵐) as Mok Hui Nam 莫曉男
- Ram Chiang (蔣志光) as Lo Ga Fai 羅家輝
- Shirley Yeung (楊思琦) as Yuen Siu Mui 阮小梅
