= The Last Breakthrough =

Hong Kong drama television series

- Promo poster
- 天涯俠醫
- Genre: Modern Drama
- Written by: Lau Choi-wan; Wong Hiu-chong; Lo Mei-wun
- Starring: Nick Cheung; Raymond Lam; Sonija Kwok; Leila Tong; Bosco Wong; Mimi Lo; Sharon Chan; Waise Lee; Kiki Sheung; Andrew Lin
- Opening theme: Heart Breathing 愛亦近 by Raymond Lam
- Country of origin: Hong Kong
- Original language: Cantonese
- No. of episodes: 30

Production
- Producer: Lam Chi-wah
- Running time: 45 minutes (approx.)

Original release
- Network: TVB
- Release: November 15 – December 26, 2004

Related
- Split Second; Shades of Truth

The Last Breakthrough
- Traditional Chinese: 天涯俠醫
- Simplified Chinese: 天涯侠医
- Literal meaning: "Heaven Saint Healer"
Transcriptions
Standard Mandarin
- Hanyu Pinyin: Tiān yá xiá yī
Yue: Cantonese
- Yale Romanization: tian nga hap yi
- Jyutping: tin1 ngaai4 haap6 ji1

The Last Breakthrough (Traditional Chinese: 天涯俠醫; literally "Heaven Saint Healer") (Chinese: 天涯俠醫; Jyutping: tin1 ngaai4 haap6 ji1) is a 2004 Hong Kong television medical drama produced by TVB. The drama revolves around a group of doctors who provide volunteer medical relief in developing countries. Medical relief scenes were filmed in Kenya.

== Plot ==
Cardiologist doctor Albert Wong Po Fun (Nick Cheung) and his girlfriend Eva (Gigi Leung) return from Kenya after volunteering with LifeForce. Before they had undertaken the trip, Eva had asked Ah Fun many times to accompany her to Kenya, though he had refused because he was busy treating wealthy patients in Hong Kong. Ah Fun takes Eva out to dinner and talk of how beautiful it was in Kenya and how they should go there some time after their marriage. However, fate strikes them as Eva is run over by a car after their dinner trying to pick up a key-ring that Ah Fun had given to her.

After the incident, Ah Fun visits Kenya because of Eva's influence. On his way to the LifeForce camp, he encounters a pregnant woman in trouble who is about to give birth to a baby boy. Ah Fun stops and helps the woman, who gives birth to a baby boy. The incident inspires Ah Fun to become an obstetrician so he can help deliver more babies. Eight years later, Ah Fun has a clinic opened to serve the people in the neighbourhood, sometimes even for free. He has changed completely from being competitive and greedy for power to helpful and cheerful. The story continues on about how he and his friends help out at LifeForce.

His life changes when Hong Kiu (Sonija Kwok) comes along. Hong Kiu is in love with Ah Fun but Ah Fun still cannot forget Eva. After many things (including a one-night stand), Hong Kiu and Ah Fun finally get together and they marry. But tragedy strikes again when Hong Kiu is diagnosed with womb cancer while she is pregnant. The doctors advise her to get rid of the baby and cut the tumor, but she refuses; instead, she waits until the baby is born and then accepts the surgery.

The surgery ends tragically and Hong Kiu is left in a coma. Ah Fun continues to visit her with their daughter every day at the same time. After persistent waiting, she awakes and the family travels to Kenya.

== Cast ==
=== Main cast ===
- Nick Cheung as Wong-po Fun (王甫芬)
- Raymond Lam as Ken Chai Bak-heng (齊百恆)
- Sonija Kwok as Hong Kiu (康喬)
- Leila Tong as Ha Hiu Ching (夏曉晴)
- Bosco Wong as Tung Chi-sum (童子琛)
- Mimi Lo as Kitty Lai Sum-kit(黎心潔)
- Sharon Chan as Yoyo Ko Siu-kau (高小柔)
- Waise Lee as Jack Chai Ka-sheung (齊嘉尚)
- Kiki Sheung as Wong-po Hing (王甫馨)
- Andrew Lin as Ho Ching (賀正)
- Felix Lok as Ko Kei (高堃)
- Lau Kong as Wong-po Kin (王甫堅)
- Suet Nei as Cheung Sau-yu (張秀瑜)
- Patrick Dunn as Brian Cheuk Siu-him (卓紹謙)
- Margaret Chung as Susan So Wai-san (蘇惠珊)
- Law Lan as Chow Kuk (周菊)
- Cecilia Fong as Yuen Choi-man (阮采文)
- Selena Li as Shirley Fong Hok-yi (方學兒)
- Dickson Lee as Yiu Chun-sun (姚俊新)
- Kenneth Ma as Dr. Shek

=== Special Guest Star ===
- Gigi Leung as Eva Ha Hiu Tung (夏曉彤)
- Candy Lo as Ho Lam (賀琳)
- Chung King-fai as Lung Sing (龍城)
- Akina Hong as Tammy Tam (岑太) introduced in ep.13
