= Detective Investigation Files =

- 刑事偵緝檔案
- Genre: Police procedural drama
- Starring: Michael Tao; Joey Leung; Kenix Kwok; Louisa So
- Opening theme: 感情真相 by Leo Ku
- Ending theme: 對你始終痴心一往 by Leo Ku
- Country of origin: Hong Kong
- Original language: Cantonese
- No. of episodes: 20

Production
- Producer: Poon Ka Tak
- Running time: approx. 45 minutes

Original release
- Network: Television Broadcasts Limited
- Release: March 13 – April 7, 1995

Related
- Detective Investigation Files II; Detective Investigation Files III; Detective Investigation Files IV

Detective Investigation Files is a 1995 Hong Kong crime investigation drama series produced by Poon Ka Tak for TVB and is the first installment in the Detective Investigation Files series. The main characters were played by Michael Tao, Joey Leung, Kenix Kwok and Louisa So. This installment featured five different cases. In 2022, the drama was selected as one of ten classic TVB dramas being honoured for Youku and TVB's new programme.

== Synopsis ==
Cops Yung (Michael Tao) and Yee (Leung Wing Chung) were good friends as well as partners. Their shrewdness and intelligence helped break many mysterious murder cases such as ‘Love Suicide’, ‘Chopped Corpse’, ‘Murderer Vs Victim’.

Yung and Yee shared their worries over love too. Yung's girlfriend Chi (Kwan Po Wai) jilted Yung to go after Yee when she learned about Yee's wealth. Yung, on the other hand, met the headstrong reporter Chit (Kenix Kwok) during an investigation and they fall for each other. However, Chit already had a boyfriend...

== Cast ==
=== Main cast ===
Actor	Role	Description
Michael Tao	Cheung Tai Yung (張大勇)	張Sir、勇哥、大勇; Sergeant; Detective; Jessie's boyfriend Gigi and Chung Yi's best friend
Joey Leung	Lee Chung Yi (李忠義)	義仔; Senior Constable; Detective; Tai Yung's subordinate and best friend Gigi's husband
Kenix Kwok	Ko Chit (高婕)	Jessie、「細妹」 Reporter; Tai Yung's girlfriend
Louisa So	Yung Kam Chi (容金枝)	Gigi、阿枝; Waitress; Tai Yung's best friend Chung Yi's wife

=== Case 1: Insurance murder case（Episode 1-3） ===
Actor	Role	Description
Henry Lee	Fong Chun Kit	Lee Man Fong's husband Daisy's secret lover Captured in episode 2
Tsui Ga Bo	Lee Man Fong	Nurse; Fong Chun Kit's wife Stabbed to death by Daisy in episode 2
Jay Leung	Daisy	Insurance manager Fong Chun Kit's secret lover Murdered Lee Man Fong and framed Fong Chun Kit for the murder in episode 2 Captured in episode 3

=== Case 2: Secret of an Angel（Episode 3-6） ===
Actor	Role	Description
Chong Man Sui	Chung Ho Yi	Canteen cashier A Vietnamese-Chinese; Chung Kit Yi's younger sister Lee Chung Yi's ex-girlfriend Killed Wu Sam in episode 3 Arrested in episode 5
Pok Kwan	Wu Sam	Tabloid reporter Extorted Chung Kit Yi numerous times Killed by Chung Ho Yi in episode 3
Lee Kwai Ying	Chung Kit Yi	Chung Ho Yi's older sister Wife of a wealthy businessman Gave birth to a deformed baby and was extorted by Wu Sam

=== Case 3: The Butterfly Murders case（Episode 6-10） ===
Actor	Role	Description
Ram Chiang	Wong Wai On	Tse Yuen Ting's husband
Mak Chui Han	Tse Yuen Ting	Emily Jessie's Boss Wong Wai On's wife Killed Lam Yan Mei and Peter Attempted to kill Jessie and Wong Wai On Shot by Tai Yung when she tried to run him over and drove off a cliff (Unknown whether she died from the gunshot or car crash)
Zhang Yan	Lam Yan Mei	阿May; Wong Wai On's secret lover Jessie's friend Killed by Tse Yuen Ting
Gregory Charles Rivers	Peter	Tse Yuen Ting's secret lover Killed by Tse Yuen Ting

=== Case 4: Videotape extortion（Episode 12-14） ===
Actor	Role	Description
Angie Cheong	Pak Mei	Former strip dancer Conspired with Wong Keung to daze and extort money from various men Killed by Wong Keung in episode 12
Derek Kok	Wong Keung	Pak Mei's boyfriend Attacked and killed Pak Mei in episode 12; Arrested in episode 14

=== Case 5: True and false kidnapping (Episode 15-20) ===
Actor	Role	Description
Maggie Chan	Ko Man	Jessie's older sister Kan Tong Tong's mother Failed to fake Kan Tong Tong's kidnapping
Meiki Wong	Kan Tong Tong	Ko Man's daughter Jessie's niece Kidnapped by Kan Chi Yuen
Gary Chan	Kan Chi Yuen	Ko Man's brother-in-law Kan Tong Tong's uncle Kidnapped Kan Tong Tong
