= Michael Dao =

Hong Kong actor (born 1963)

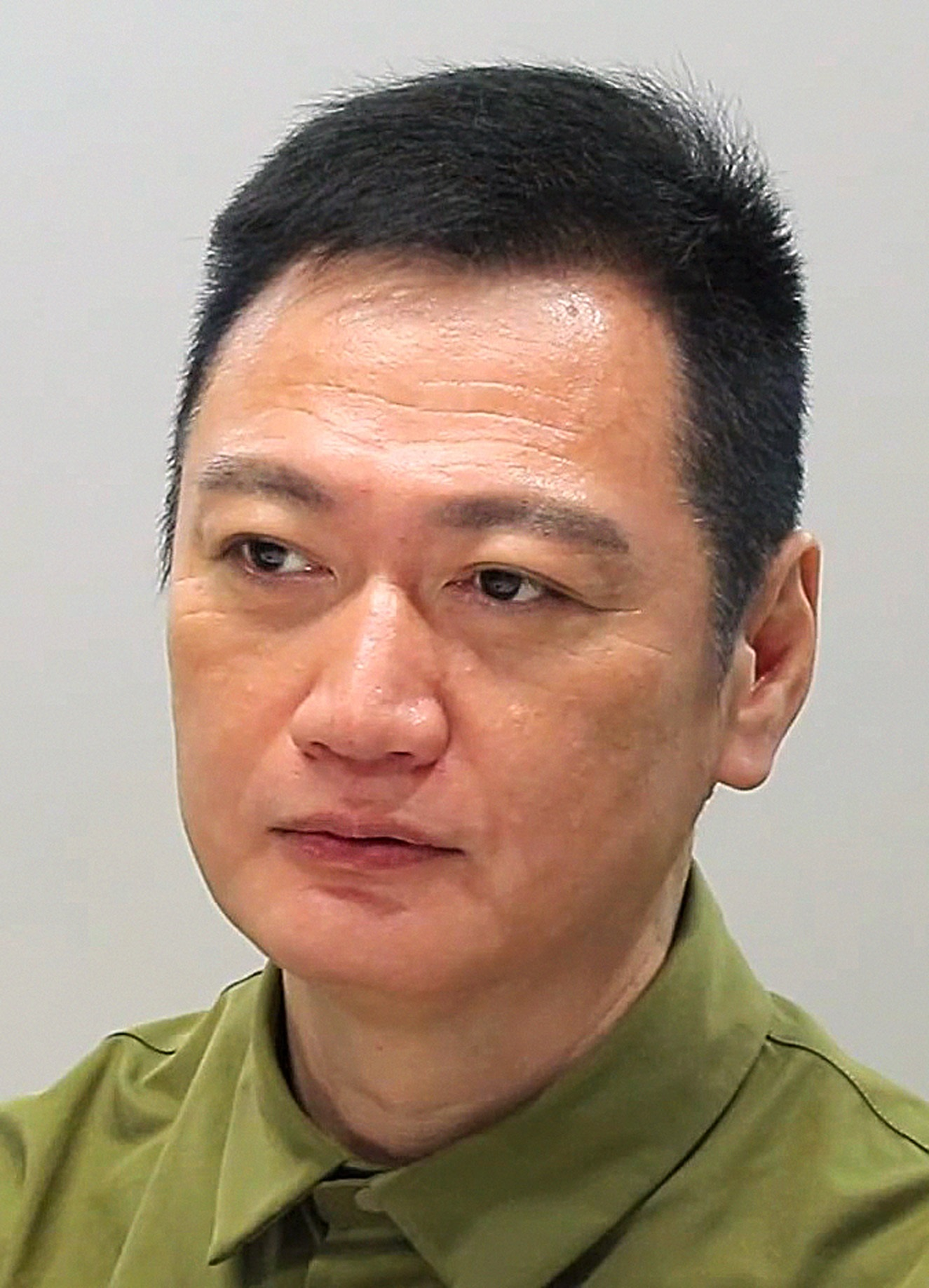
- Dao in 2019
- Born: 26 August 1963 (age 62); British Hong Kong
- Occupations: Actor, host, singer
- Years active: 1983–present
- Agent: TVB (1983–1997, 2003–2009)
- Spouse: Wong Wai Po (m. 2000–2007)

Michael Dao Tai-yu (Chinese: 陶大宇, born 26 August 1963) is a Hong Kong television actor.

== Career ==
Dao entered the acting industry in the 1980s, affiliating with TVB. It was during this period that Dao earned the name "Housewife Killer" due to his overwhelming popularity amongst housewives (who arguably constitute a majority of television viewing audiences in Hong Kong), solidifying his position as a first tier television actor in TVB.

Dao later moved over to rival ATV in 1997 after problems over his contract with TVB. His ATV series Flaming Brothers defeated the TVB rival show at the time, a landmark for ATV. Apart from filming ATV series, Dao has also filmed in China and Singapore. He returned to TVB in 2004 and has starred in a number of television series since. Once again, problems with his contract resulted in Dao leaving TVB in 2009 and worked mostly in mainland China and occasionally in Hong Kong.

In 2021, Dao gained popularity after numerous videos of him singing Andy Lau's 1996 song "Reverse The Earth" (Chinese: 倒轉地球) in a unique voice and style resurfaced. Dao was known to have performed at various Chinese malls singing various Cantonese/Mandarin pop songs for commercial events since 2020, and was imitated across the internet by various netizens, including Douyin, YouTube and Poki Ng from the Hong Kong boyband ERROR. This has also led to creation of fan groups on Facebook humorously advocating for Dao to become a full-fledged singer. Dao has responded positively, saying he enjoys entertaining people and jokingly hopes being able to catch up after Louis Koo's spot as favourite male singer in Hong Kong's Ultimate Song Chart Awards Presentation (Chinese: 叱咤樂壇流行榜頒獎典禮).

== Filmography ==
=== Television series ===
Year	Title	Role	Remark
1985	The Yang's Saga	Poon Fu	
1986	New Heavenly Sword and Dragon Sabre	Fan Yiu	
1987	Genghis Khan	Muk Wah-lai	
1988	Twilight of a Nation	Lee Chiu-sau	
1989	Looking Back in Anger	Herman	
1991	The Breaking Point	Hui Ka-kui	
1991	On the Edge	Yeung Chi-piew	
1992	File of Justice	Michael Kong Shing-yu	
1992	The Greed of Man	Ting Yik-hai	
1993	File of Justice II	Michael Kong Shing-yu	
1994	Glittering Moments	Szeto Lap-chau	
1994	File of Justice III	Michael Kong Shing-yu	
1995	File of Justice IV	Michael Kong Shing-yu	
1995	Detective Investigation Files	Cheung Tai-yung	
1995-1996	Detective Investigation Files II	Cheung Tai-yung	
1996	Ambition	Kwok Ka-bo	Released overseas in 1993; aired locally on TVB Jade in 1996
1997	File of Justice V	Michael Kong Shing-yu	
1997	Detective Investigation Files III	Cheung Tai-yung	Last TVB series before moving to ATV
1998	The New Adventures of Wisely	Wisely	Singaporean series; broadcast by TCS
1999	Flaming Brothers	Steven Lee Siu-tin	First ATV series after leaving TVB
2000	Showbiz Tycoon	Wan Yuet-ting	
2001	To Where He Belongs	Mao Jun	ATV series
2002	Love Scar	Ah Chuan	CTS series
2004	Mystic Detective Files	Yip Sing-fai	i-cable series
2004	Shine On You	Cheng Zhing-leung	Comeback series for TVB
2005	Love Bond	Lam Yat-kong	
2005	Fantasy Hotel	Bob Kam Chi-kit	
2007	On the First Beat	Cheung King-fung	Best Actor Nomination (Top 20)
2008	Wasabi Mon Amour	Chung Lai-wo	
2010	Sisters of Pearl	Hung Yiu-sang	Last TVB series before terminating contract with TVB in 2009
2014	Wait for Happiness		Mainland China series
2014	Heroes in Sui and Tang Dynasties		Cantonese dub
2016	The Hiddens	Cheong Soon-on	Hong Kong series produced by Gary Tang; aired on Astro Wah Lai Toi in Malaysia and MyTV SUPER in Hong Kong

=== Television shows ===
Year	Title	Network	Role	Note
2020	Hot Chef	ViuTV	Host	Cooking Competition Show
