= Untraceable Evidence =

Police Procedural in Hong Kong

- Also known as: Gam Jing Sut Luk
- 鑑證實錄
- Genre: Police Procedural
- Starring: Bowie Lam; Flora Chan; Lee San-san; Margaret Chung; Simon Lo
- Country of origin: Hong Kong
- Original language: Cantonese
- No. of episodes: 20

Production
- Executive producer: Poon Ka Tak (潘嘉德)

Original release
- Network: TVB

Related
- 鑑證實錄 2

Untraceable Evidence
- Chinese: 鑑證實錄
- Literal meaning: "The Forensic Records"
Transcriptions
Standard Mandarin
- Hanyu Pinyin: jiàn zhèng shí lù
Yue: Cantonese
- Yale Romanization: gaam jing saht luhk
- Jyutping: gaam3 zing3 sat6 luk6

Untraceable Evidence (Chinese: 鑑證實錄) is a Police Procedural in Hong Kong, produced by TVB. The series had two seasons.

== Season 1 ==
Theme Song: Leaving a Scar (留痕) by Edmond Leung

== Cast ==
- Bowie Lam as Tsang Ka Yuen (曾家原)
- Flora Chan as Pauline Lip Bo Yin (聶寶言)
- Lee San-san as Choi Siu Tong (蔡小棠)
- Derek Kok as Cho Chi Yui (曹志銳)
- Margaret Chung as Lip Chun Chun (聶津津)
- Simon Lo as Tsang Ka Kiu (曾家喬)
- Maggie Chan as Lip Bo Yee (聶寶意)

== Season 2 ==
Theme Song: Investigate (追究) by Edmond Leung

== Cast ==
- Bowie Lam as Tsang Ka Yuen (曾家原)
- Flora Chan as Pauline Lip Bo Yin (聶寶言)
- Lee San-san as Choi Siu Tong (蔡小棠)
- Margaret Chung as Lip Chun Chun (聶津津)
- Simon Lo as Tsang Ka Kiu (曾家喬)
- Ellesmere Choi as Wong Ying Kit (王英傑)
- Hawick Lau as Yeung Chi Lun (楊志倫)
- Gabriel Harrison as Anthony Yuen Tin Ming (袁天明)
- Maggie Chan as Lip Bo Yee (聶寶意)
