= Joey Leung =

Hong Kong actor, director, screenwriter/playwright

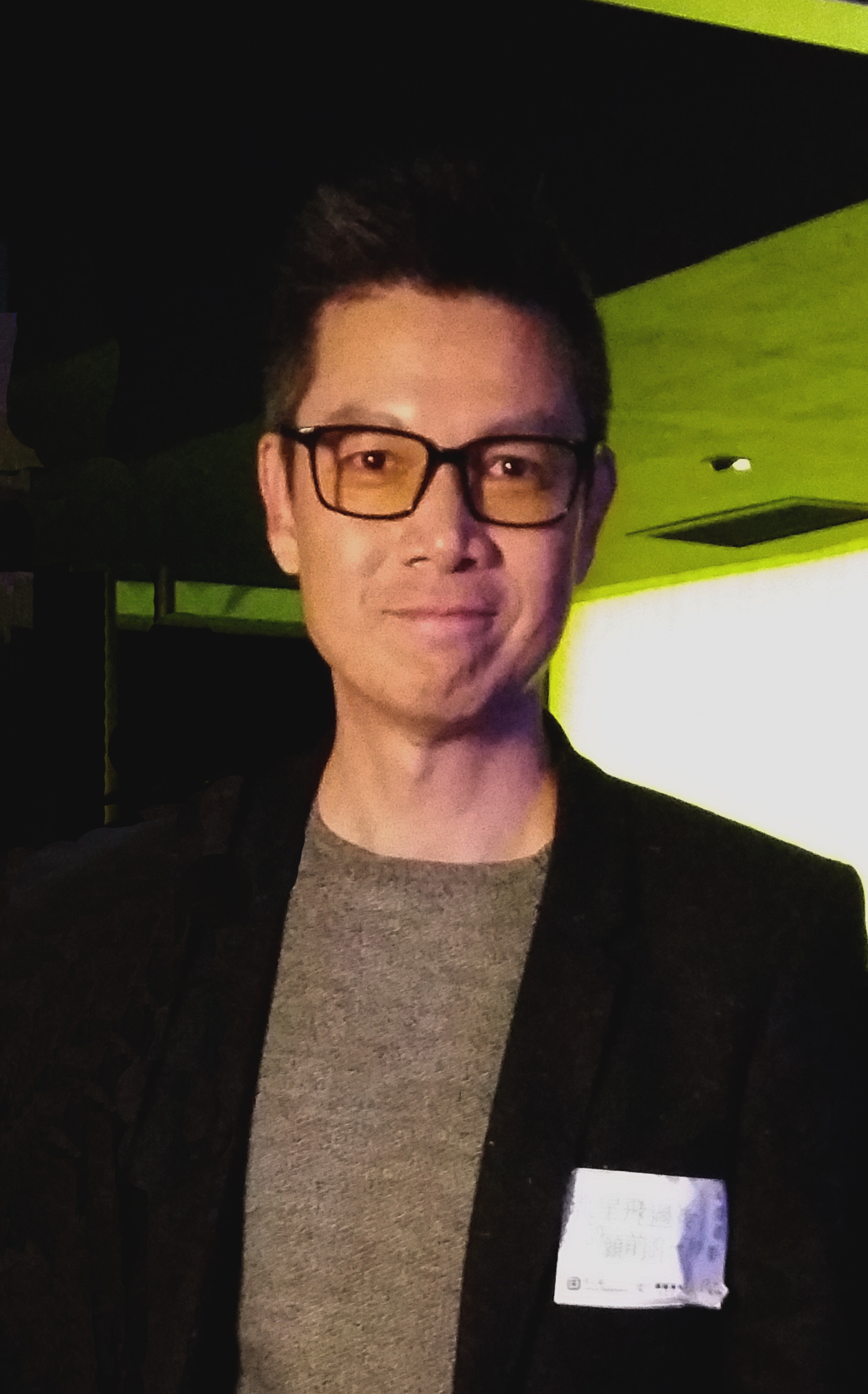
- Leung in 2016
- Born: September 10, 1965 (age 60); Hong Kong
- Occupations: Actor; director; screenwriter/playwright; program host (TV & Radio); drama tutor

Chinese name
- Traditional Chinese: 梁榮忠
- Simplified Chinese: 梁荣忠
Transcriptions
Standard Mandarin
- Hanyu Pinyin: Liáng Róngzhōng

Joey Leung Wing-Chung (Chinese: 梁榮忠; born September 10, 1965) is a Hong Kong actor, director, screenwriter/playwright, program host (TV & Radio) and drama tutor.

== Career ==
He has starred in movies such as Girl Boxer (2004), Master of Martial Arts (1997) and Kung Fu King (2005). He hosted the show Minutes to Fame with Hacken Lee.

In September 2008, he started and hosted a show from RTHK (有冇搞錯). On June 6, 2011 he announced that he was leaving the show for another one on the same radio station (瘋 Show 快活人). This announcement created a lot of mixed feelings from his fans. He left the program (瘋 Show 快活人) on November 25, 2016. Then, he started a new program called 60 minutes with Joey Leung (一個鐘一個梁榮忠) on June 25, 2017 every Sunday from 12 pm to 1 pm.

== Personal life ==
He has a collection of Gundam merchandises and was displayed in the Gundam Expo Hong Kong in 2009.

== Filmography ==
- Love on Delivery (1994)
- Hail the Judge (1994)
- The Bodyguard from Beijing (1994)
- Detective Investigation Files I (1995)
- Detective Investigation Files II (1995)
- Detective Investigation Files III (1997)
- As Sure As Fate (1997)
- The Legend of Master Chai (1997)
- Journey to the West II (1998)
- My Date with a Vampire II (1999)
- Book and Sword, Gratitude and Revenge (2002)
- Heavenly In-Laws (2007)
