= List of TVB series (1999) =

This is a list of series released by or aired on TVB Jade Channel in 1999.

== First line series ==
These dramas aired in Hong Kong from 7:30 to 8:30 pm, Monday to Friday on TVB.

Airing date	English title (Chinese title)	Number of episodes	Main cast	Theme song (T) Sub-theme song (ST)	Genre	Notes	Official website
18 Jan- 12 Mar	The Flying Fox of Snowy Mountain 雪山飛狐	40	Sunny Chan, Charmaine Sheh, Joyce Tang, Felix Wong, Maggie Siu, Vincent Wan, Marco Ngai	T: "愛你愛到不知痛" (Jacky Cheung)	Costume drama	Copyright notice on VHS: 1998.	Official website
15 Mar- 7 May	Happy Ever After 金玉滿堂	40	Bobby Au Yeung, Mariane Chan, Nadia Chan, Kwong Wah, Roger Kwok, Fiona Leung	T: "甜酸苦辣" (Roman Tam); ST: "愛你不是渾閒事" (Nadia Chan)	Costume drama		Official website
10 May- 4 Jun	A Matter of Business 千里姻緣兜錯圈	20	Ada Choi, Chin Ka Lok, Cutie Miu, Joe Ma, Florence Kwok		Modern drama		Official website
7 Jun- 17 Jul	Justice Sung II 狀王宋世傑(貳)	32	Cheung Tat Ming, Amy Kwok, Dayo Wong	T: "清風不染" (Adam Cheng)	Costume drama	Sequel to 1997's Justice Sung.	Official website
19 July- 6 Aug	Side Beat 吾係差人 (or 兼職警察)	15	Wong He, Jackie Lui, Flora Chan	T: "好心情" (Eason Chan)	Modern action	Overseas version 20 episodes Released overseas on May 17, 1999.	Official website
9 Aug- 3 Sep	Face to Face 雙面伊人	20	Ekin Cheng, Fennie Yuen, Raymond Cho, Michael Tse	T: "雙面人" (Ekin Cheng)	Modern drama	Released overseas on August 2, 1999.	Official website
6 Sep- 1 Oct	Road to Eternity 布袋和尚	20	Gordon Lam, Mariane Chan, Marco Ngai, Rain Lau	T: "笑喇笑喇笑一笑" (James Wong)	Costume drama		
4 Oct- 29 Oct	Life for Life 命轉情真	20	Cheung Tat Ming, Mariane Chan, Cutie Mui, Michael Tse, Louisa So	T: "是這刻" (Cheung Tat Ming)			
1 Nov- 12 Dec	Plain Love II 茶是故鄉濃	32	Gordon Lam, Maggie Cheung, Evergreen Mak, Yuen Wah, Louisa So	T: "接近" (Jacky Cheung & Priscilla Chan)	Period drama		Official website
13 Dec- 31 Dec	A Smiling Ghost Story 衝上人間	15	Maggie Cheung, Roger Kwok, Nick Cheung, Monica Chan, Fiona Yuen, Joe Ma	T: "快樂的" (Miriam Yeung)	Modern drama	Overseas version 20 episodes Released overseas in 1998. Copyright notice: 1998.	website

== Second line series ==
These dramas aired in Hong Kong from 9:35 to 10:35 pm, Monday to Friday on TVB.

Airing date	English title (Chinese title)	Number of episodes	Main cast	Theme song (T) Sub-theme song (ST)	Genre	Notes	Official website
4 Jan- 29 Jan	Untraceable Evidence II 鑑證實錄II	20	Bowie Lam, Flora Chan, Lee San San, Margaret Chung, Gabriel Harrison, Hawick Lau, Cherie Chan	T: "追究" (Edmond Leung)	Modern suspense	Sequel to 1997's Untraceable Evidence. Copyright notice: 1998 (Eps. 1-8 & 10-12), 1999 (Eps. 9 & 13-20).	Official website
1 Feb- 26 Feb	Man's Best Friend 寵物情緣	20	Louis Koo, Jessica Hsuan, Sammi Cheng, Jerry Lamb, Lee San San, Joe Ma	T: "真命天子" (Sammi Cheng)	Modern drama		Official website
1 Mar- 26 Mar	Feminine Masculinity 先生貴性	20	Gallen Lo, Flora Chan, Kwong Wah, Nicola Cheung, Angela Tong	T: "對你，我永不放棄" (Gallen Lo & Flora Chan)	Modern drama	Copyright notice: 1998 (Eps. 1-6), 1999 (Eps. 7-20).	Official website
29 Mar- 4 Jun	Detective Investigation Files IV 刑事偵緝檔案IV	50	Sunny Chan, Louis Koo, Jessica Hsuan, Charmaine Sheh, Lee San San, Maggie Siu	T: "萬里陽光" (Edmond Leung); ST: "宇宙無限" (Edmond Leung & Louis Koo)	Modern suspense	Indirect sequel to 1997's Detective Investigation Files III.	Official website
7 Jun- 2 Jul	A Loving Spirit 全院滿座	20	Lawrence Ng, Esther Kwan, Kingdom Yuen, Angela Tong	T: "想愛沒有情" (Amanda Lee)	Period drama		Official website
5 July- 30 Jul	Anti-Crime Squad 反黑先鋒	20	Ben Ng, Maggie Siu, Benny Chan, Louisa So, Wayne Lai, Denise Ho,	T: "愈戰愈勇" (Ekin Cheng)	Modern action	Released overseas on June 17, 1999.	Official website
16 Aug- 10 Sep	Game of Deceit 騙中傳奇	20	Nick Cheung, Jessica Hsuan, Chin Ka Lok	T: "偷天" (Nick Cheung)	Costume drama		Official website
13 Sep- 8 Oct	Dragon Love 人龍傳說	20	Benny Chan, Fennie Yuen, Chin Ka Lok, Nicola Cheung	ST: "人龍傳說" (Benny Chan)	Costume drama		Official website
11 Oct- 17 Dec	At the Threshold of an Era 創世紀	51	Gallen Lo, Sunny Chan, Flora Chan, Kenix Kwok, Roger Kwok, Maggie Siu, Nicky Wu, Liza Wang, Paul Chun, Joe Ma	T: "創造明天" (Gallen Lo); ST: "天地有情" (Gallen Lo)	Modern drama	Prequel to 2000's At the Threshold of an Era II.	website
20 Dec- 16 Jan 2000	Witness to a Prosecution 洗冤錄	22	Bobby Au Yeung, Jessica Hsuan, Mariane Chan, Frankie Lam, Michael Tse	T: "一個人" (Eason Chan)	Costume drama	Prequel to 2002's Witness to a Prosecution II.	Official website

== Third line series ==
These dramas aired in Hong Kong from 10:35 to 11:05 pm, Monday to Friday on TVB.

Airing date	English title (Chinese title)	Number of episodes	Main cast	Theme song (T) Sub-theme song (ST)	Genre	Notes	Official website
15 May 1995- 17 Nov 1999	A Kindred Spirit 真情	1128	Louise Lee, Lau Dan, Nancy Sit, Kenix Kwok, Sunny Chan, Louisa So, Florence Kwok, Hawick Lau, Kingdom Yuen, David Lui, Melissa Ng, Michael Tse, Joyce Tang, Fiona Yuen, Joe Ma	T: "無悔愛你一生" (Cally Kwong & Joyce Lee)	Modern sitcom	Copyright notice: 1995 (Eps. 1-59), 1996 (Eps. 60-212), 1997 (Eps. 213-320), 1998 (Eps. 321-469), 1999 (Eps. 470-590).	Official website

== Other series ==
Airing date	English title (Chinese title)	Number of episodes	Main cast	Theme song (T) Sub-theme song (ST)	Genre	Notes	Official website
30 Jun- 27 Jul	Unnatural Born Killer 十三密殺令	20	Ada Choi, Chin Siu Ho, Eddie Cheung	T: "十三密殺令" (Roman Tam)	Costume action	Released overseas in 1996. Copyright notice: 1996.	Official website
2 Aug- 27 Aug	Ultra Protection 非常保鑣	20	Bowie Lam, Angie Cheung, Mariane Chan, Steven Ma, Eddie Cheung	T: "早安晚安" (Steven Ma)	Modern action		Official website
11 Oct- 29 Oct	West Rail of Love 西鐵情緣	8					
