= List of TVB series (1997) =

This is a list of series released by or aired on TVB Jade Channel in 1997.

== First line series ==
These dramas aired in Hong Kong from 7:30 to 8:30 pm, Monday to Friday on TVB.

Airing date	English title (Chinese title)	Number of episodes	Main cast	Theme song (T) Sub-theme song (ST)	Genre	Notes	Official website
27 Jan- 21 Feb	Taming of the Princess 醉打金枝	20	Bobby Au Yeung, Esther Kwan, Marco Ngai, Gigi Fu	T: "醉打金枝" (David Lui)	Costume drama	Copyright notice on VHS: 1996.	Official website
24 Feb- 21 Mar	Show Time Blues 樂壇插班生	20	Gordon Lam, Wayne Lai, Cutie Mui, Elvina Kong, Joe Ma	T: "一起跟我唱" (Natalis Chan)	Modern drama		
24 Mar- 18 Apr	Lady Flower Fist 苗翠花	20	Esther Kwan, Kwong Wah, Kara Hui, Cherie Chan, Rain Lau	T: "小小女子半邊天" (Joyce Lee)	Costume drama	Released overseas on March 1, 1997. Copyright notice: 1996 (Eps. 1-14, 16, & 18-20), 1997 (Eps. 15 & 17).	Official website
21 Apr- 23 May	The Hitman Chronicles 大刺客	30	Kent Cheng, Elvis Tsui, Chin Siu Ho, Louis Koo, Patrick Tam, Louis Fan, Eddie Cheung, Gigi Fu, Astrid Chan, Vivien Leung, Jessie Chan, Alice Lau	T: "热血英雄" (Mo Kai Yin)	Costume drama	Released overseas on September 9, 1996. Copyright notice: 1996.	Official website
26 May- 20 Jun	A Road and a Will 香港人在廣州	20	Lawrence Cheng, Wayne Lai, Maggie Cheung, Cutie Mui	T: "熱身" (Julian Cheung)	Modern drama		Official website
23 Jun- 26 Jul	Old Time Buddy 難兄難弟	25	Gallen Lo, Maggie Cheung, Francis Ng, Jessica Hsuan, Joyce Tang, Jerry Lamb	T: "難兄難弟" (Gallen Lo & Maggie Cheung, Francis Ng, & Jessica Hsuan); ST: "誰更重要" (Gallen Lo)	Period drama	Related to 1998's Old Time Buddy - To Catch a Thief.	Official website
28 Jul- 26 Sep	Demi-Gods and Semi-Devils 天龍八部	45	Felix Wong, Benny Chan, Louis Fan, Carman Lee, Cheung Kwok Keung, Jay Lau, Natalie Wong, Bondy Chiu, Rain Lau	T: "難唸的經" (Emil Chau)	Costume action		Official website
29 Sep- 7 Nov	Justice Sung 狀王宋世傑	30	Cheung Tat Ming, Amy Kwok, Louis Fan, Cherie Chan	T: "神奇事" (Jordan Chan)	Costume drama	Prequel to 1999's Justice Sung II.	Official website
10 Nov- 20 Dec	A Recipe for the Heart 美味天王	29	Bobby Au-yeung, Lydia Shum, Esther Kwan, Louis Koo, Maggie Cheung, Jessica Hsuan	T: "Mamma Mia" (Lydia Shum, Bobby Au Yeung, Esther Kwan, Paul Chun, Maggie Cheung, Jessica Hsuan); ST: "彼此的世界早已拉近" (Gallen Lo)	Modern drama	Released overseas on November 7, 1997.	Official website
22 Dec 1997- 9 Jan 1998	Triumph Over Evil 真命天師	20	Ben Wong, Nick Cheung, Joyce Tang, Jay Lau	T: "人生中" (Patrick Tam)	Costume drama	Released overseas on November 28, 1997.	Official website

== Second line series ==
These dramas aired in Hong Kong from 9:35 to 10:35 pm, Monday to Friday on TVB.

Airing date	English title (Chinese title)	Number of episodes	Main cast	Theme song (T) Sub-theme song (ST)	Genre	Notes	Official website
6 Jan- 24 Jan	Corner the Con Man 皇家反千組	15	Bobby Au-yeung, Leo Ku, Monica Chan, Gigi Fu	T: "精彩故事" (Roman Tam); ST: "難得有你" (Roman Tam)	Modern suspense	Overseas version 20 episodes Released overseas on December 29, 1996. Copyright notice: 1996.	
27 Jan- 14 Feb	The Legend of Master Chai 濟公	15	Joey Leung, Vivien Leung, Timmy Ho, Cherie Chan	T: "瀟灑一派" (Hacken Lee)	Costume action	Overseas version 20 episodes Released overseas on December 16, 1996. Copyright notice: 1996.	Official website
17 Feb- 7 Mar	Working Women 當女人愛上男人	15	Kenix Kwok, Elvina Kong, Cutie Mui, Jay Lau, Kenneth Chan, Timmy Ho	T: "放不低" (Sammi Cheng)	Modern drama	Overseas version 20 episodes Released overseas on October 23, 1996. Copyright notice: 1996.	
10 Mar- 9 May	File of Justice V 壹號皇庭V	45	Bobby Au-yeung, Michael Tao, Lawrence Ng, Patrick Tam, Bowie Lam, Jessica Hsuan, Ada Choi, Flora Chan, Joyce Koi, Astrid Chan	T: "不應該發生" (Steven Ma)	Modern drama	Sequel to 1995's File of Justice IV.	Official website
12 May- 6 Jun	Mystery Files 迷離檔案	20	Gallen Lo, Nick Cheung, Maggie Cheung, Marco Ngai	T: "有事" (Josie Ho); ST: "抱雪" (Jacky Cheung)	Modern action	Released overseas on May 7, 1997.	Official website
9 Jun- 4 Jul	Deadly Protection 保護證人組	20	Wong He, Marco Ngai, Gigi Fu, Kara Wai	T: "人間好漢" (George Lam)	Modern action		Official website
7 Jul- 1 Aug	Drunken Angels 男人四十打功夫	20	Yuen Wah, Mariane Chan	T: "蓋世男兒" (George Lam)	Costume drama	Released overseas on July 4, 1997.	Official website
4 Aug- 29 Aug	Time Before Time 大鬧廣昌隆	20	Gordon Lam, Kathy Chow, Florence Kwok, Kenneth Chan	T: "抱緊眼前人" (Anita Mui); ST: "我愛風光好" (Anita Mui & Anthony Lun)	Period drama	Released overseas on July 18, 1997.	Official website
1 Sep- 24 Oct	Detective Investigation Files III 刑事偵緝檔案III	40	Michael Tao, Kenix Kwok, Joey Leung, Monica Chan, Margaret Chung	T: "難得情真" (Edmond Leung); ST: "忘得了，忘不了" (Edmond Leung)	Modern suspense	Sequel to 1995's Detective Investigation Files II. Indirect prequel to 1999's Detective Investigation Files IV. Released overseas on August 26, 1997.	Official website
27 Oct- 21 Nov	The Disappearance 隱形怪傑	20	Gordon Lam, Bowie Lam, Mariane Chan, Miriam Yeung, Edmond Leung	T: "透明" (Edmond Leung)	Modern drama	Released overseas on October 23, 1997.	Official website
24 Nov- 19 Dec	I Can't Accept Corruption 廉政追緝令	20	Louis Koo, Monica Chan, Fennie Yuen, Eddie Cheung, Timmy Ho, Shirley Cheung	T: "藏身" (Ronald Cheng)	Modern suspense		Official website
22 Dec 1997- 16 Jan 1998	Untraceable Evidence 鑑證實錄	20	Bowie Lam, Flora Chan, Margaret Chung, Lee San San	T: "留痕" (Edmond Leung)	Modern suspense	Prequel to 1999's Untraceable Evidence II. Released overseas on December 16, 1997.	Official website

== Third line series ==
These dramas aired in Hong Kong from 10:35 to 11:05 pm, Monday to Friday on TVB.

Airing date	English title (Chinese title)	Number of episodes	Main cast	Theme song (T) Sub-theme song (ST)	Genre	Notes	Official website
15 May 1995- 17 Nov 1999	A Kindred Spirit 真情	1128	Louise Lee, Lau Dan, Nancy Sit, Kenix Kwok, Sunny Chan, Louisa So, Florence Kwok, Hawick Lau, Kingdom Yuen, David Lui, Melissa Ng, Michael Tse, Joyce Tang, Fiona Yuen, Joe Ma	T: "無悔愛你一生" (Cally Kwong & Joyce Lee)	Modern sitcom	Copyright notice: 1995 (Eps. 1-59), 1996 (Eps. 60-212), 1997 (Eps. 213-320), 1998 (Eps. 321-469), 1999 (Eps. 470-590).	Official website

== Other series ==
Airing date	English title (Chinese title)	Number of episodes	Main cast	Theme song (T) Sub-theme song (ST)	Genre	Notes	Official website
20 Jan- 14 Feb	Self Denial 孝感動天	20	Marco Ngai, Ada Choi, Gallen Lo, Gloria Yip	T: "從沒代價" (Nadia Chan)	Costume drama	Released overseas on February 6, 1995. Copyright notice: 1995.	
17 Apr- 14 May	Weapons of Power 英雄貴姓	20	Leo Ku, Gigi Fu, Louis Fan	T: "英雄貴姓" (Andy Hui)	Costume drama	Released overseas on September 2, 1996. Copyright notice: 1996. Copyright notice on VHS: 1995.	
3 Jul- 30 Jul	Against the Blade of Honour 圓月彎刀	20	Louis Koo, Vivien Leung, Irene Wan, Eddie Cheung	T: "意難平" (Christine Ng)	Costume drama	Overseas version 1: Released overseas on February 5, 1996. Copyright notice: 1995. Overseas version 2: Released overseas on June 3, 1996. Copyright notice: 1996.	
