= Law Lok-lam =

Hong Kong actor

- 羅樂林
- Born: 20 October 1948 (age 78); British Hong Kong
- Occupation: Actor
- Years active: 1970–present
- Spouse(s): Unknown (1969-?; divorced); Chan Bo-yee (1982)
- Children: 3 daughters
- Awards: TVB Anniversary Awards – 2014 Professional Actor Awards

Chinese name
- Simplified Chinese: 罗乐林
Transcriptions
Standard Mandarin
- Hanyu Pinyin: Luō Lèlín
Yue: Cantonese
- Jyutping: Lo4 Lok6 Lam4
- Website: Official TVB profile

Law Lok-lam (Chinese: 羅樂林, born 20 October 1948) is a Hong Kong actor currently under Television Broadcasts Limited (TVB) management. As a television actor active since the 1970s, Law has appeared in numerous television dramas. His extensive body of work has led to multiple productions featuring his death scenes being broadcast on the same day. Law originally joined TVB in 1976 as a film extra, but left the same year to return to rival station Commercial Television (CTV). Almost a decade with another rival station Asia Television (ATV), he returned to TVB in 1990. He was one of five artistes awarded the "TVB Professional Actor Awards" in 2014 for his many years as a dedicated TVB employee.

== Early life ==
Law was born in British Hong Kong and immigrated with his family at the age of 14 to Macao. One of his earliest jobs was working at a plastic factory and accompanying the truck drivers during shipment deliveries. After graduating from high school he opened a small traveling agency and also became a tour guide. At the age of 23 he signed up for acting at the Shaw Brothers artists class.

== Career ==
Law gained international public attention in April 2011 when five TVB dramas he starred in were broadcast on the same day showing all his characters dying. He was dubbed "the actor that died 5 times in one day (or 24 hours)". The dramas that aired were 2011 Grace Under Fire, 2011 Relic of an Emissary, 2006 Face to Fate, 2002 Police Station No. 7 and 2001 Virtues of Harmony.

== Filmography ==
=== Television dramas ===
==== Television Broadcasts Limited (TVB) ====
Year	English Title	Chinese Title	Role	Notes
1976	That Tender Age	少年十五二十時		
1990	Kim Mo Tuk Ku Kau Pait	劍魔獨孤求敗	Lonely Sky (獨孤天峰)	
1990	Blood of Good and Evil	我本善良	Cheung Ding-bong (蔣定邦)	
1990	The Serpentine Romance	奇幻人間世	Rock musician (石頭道人)	
1990	The Hunter's Prey	烏金血劍	Chung Dan (宗單)	
1990	An Elite's Choice	飛越官場	Wai Yuk-koon (韋玉冠)	
1990	Brother, Handcuff Me	綫人		TV movie
1991	The Zu Mountain Saga	蜀山奇俠之仙侶奇緣	Hin Yuen Fat King (軒轅法王)	
1991	The Sword of Conquest	怒劍嘯狂沙	Wu Yan (烏恩)	
1991	The Survivor	藍色風暴	Liu Gwan (雷軍)	
1992	Thief of Honour	血璽金刀	Cheung Jan (張真)	
1992	The Greed of Man	大時代	Yip Tin (葉天)	
1992	Revelation of the Last Hero	風之刀	Hung Chun (洪震)	
1992	Road For The Heroes	出位江湖	Mo Yue-man (毛語問)	
1993	The Buddhism Palm Strikes Back	如來神掌再戰江湖	Lung Kim-fei (龍劍飛)	
1993	The Mystery of the Condor Hero	射鵰英雄傳之九陰真經	Au-yeung Fung (歐陽峰)	
1993	The Heroes From Shaolin	武尊少林	Yong Ching (雍正)	
1993	Racing Peak	馬場大亨	Ngai Koon-hok (倪冠鶴)	
1993	All About Tin	魔刀俠情	The Traitor (逆天唯我)	
1994	Fate of the Last Empire	清宮氣數錄	Lim Bou-san (廉抱山)	
1994	The Intangible Truth	生死訟	Ma Gum-chiu (馬錦超)	
1994	The Master of Martial Arts	黃飛鴻系列之鐵膽梁寬	Luk Tse-kong (陸志剛)	
1995	Justice Pao	包青天		
1995	Down Memory Lane	萬里長情	Chow Kam-wing (周金榮)	
1995	The Criminal Investigator	O記實錄	Law Kam-sing (羅金勝)	
1995	Debts of a Life Time	忘情闊少爺	Ko Chun-ho (高振豪)	
1995	The Fist Of Law	大捕快	Ho Fai-sing (何化成)	
1995	A Stage of Turbulence	刀馬旦	Shum Tit-lan (沈鐵蘭)	
1995	Tears Of Butterflies	胭花淚		TV movie
1996	Rise Of The Taiji Master	武當張三丰	Fire Dragon person (火龍真人)	
1996	State of Divinity	笑傲江湖	Yam Ngor-hang (任我行)	
1997	The Hitman Chronicles	大刺客		TV movie
1997	Deadly Protection	保護證人組	Chan Chung-yee (陳忠義)	
1997	Time Before Time	大鬧廣昌隆	Che Yuet-ting (車月亭)	
1997	Detective Investigation Files	刑事偵緝檔案	Fung Sung-yip (方崇業)	
1998	War and Remembrance	乾隆大帝	Yung Ching (雍正)	
1998	Journey to the West II	西遊記(貳)	Dragon King of the East Sea (東海龍王); Chan Gwong-yiu (陳光蕊)	
1999	The Flying Fox of Snowy Mountain	雪山飛狐 1999	Ng Sam-gwai	
1999	Man's Best Friend	寵物情緣	Dai Chung (戴忠)	
1999	Detective Investigation Files IV	刑事偵緝檔案IV	Man Gwok-tai (文國泰)	
1999	Justice Sung II	狀王宋世傑(貳)	General Ti Tau (鐵頭將軍)	
1999	Unnatural Born Killer	十三密殺令	Yim Sai-fan (嚴世藩)	
1999	Anti-Crime Squad	反黑先鋒	Seung Kwok-dung (常國棟)	
1999	Ultra Protection	非常保鑣	Fu Pak-kin (傅百堅)	
1999	Face to Face	雙面伊人	Lam Yiu-on (林耀安)	
1999	Game of Deceit	騙中傳奇	Chin Fung-hung (錢方孔)	
1999	Road to Eternity	布袋和尚	Ngai Jing (魏徵)	
1999	Dragon Love	人龍傳說	Chow Ngo-tin (周傲天)	
1999	At the Threshold of an Era	創世紀	Ma Sing-choi (馬成才)	
2001	Gods of Honour	封神榜	Kei Cheung (姬昌)	
2001	Virtues of Harmony	皆大歡喜	Kam Wah (金華)	
2001	Police Station No. 7	七號差館	Suen Chun (孫全)	
2002	Love Is Beautiful	無頭東宮	Cheung Bak-seung (張伯常)	
2002	Eternal Happiness	再生緣	Lau Chit (劉捷)	
2002	Good Against Evil	點指賊賊賊捉賊	Cau Si-gu (巢思故)	
2003	Witness to a Prosecution II	洗冤錄II	Jin Ken (展堅)	
2003	Perish in the Name of Love	帝女花	Chow Hing (周興)	
2003	Virtues of Harmony II	皆大歡喜 (時裝版)	Kam Wah (金華)	
2003	Better Halves	金牌冰人	Cheun Tai Wai (秦太蔚)	
2003	Find the Light	英雄·刀·少年	Tam Gai-suen (譚繼洵 御史台)	
2004	Lady Fan	烽火奇遇結良緣	Fan Hung (樊洪)	
2004	Virtues of Harmony II	皆大歡喜 (時裝版)	Sam Ho (岑豪)	
2004	Blade Heart	血薦軒轅	Sima Suen (司馬信)	
2004	Twin of Brothers	大唐雙龍傳	Song Kuet (宋缺)	
2004	Placebo Cure	心理心裏有個謎	Man Ching-leung (萬正良)	
2004	The Conqueror's Story	楚漢驕雄	Fan Tsang (范增)	
2005	The Academy	學警雄心	Sau (壽哥)	
2005	The Gentle Crackdown	秀才遇著兵	Siu Ching-gong (邵正罡)	
2005	The Charm Beneath	胭脂水粉	Lam Wai-bun (林唯本)	
2005	The Herbalist's Manual	本草藥王	Yim Sung (嚴嵩)	
2006	Face to Fate	布衣神相	Mo Seung-tse (無相子)	
2006	The Biter Bitten	人生馬戲團	Ho Wing-gai (何永佳)	
2006	Safe Guards	鐵血保鏢	Lok Bing-cheung (駱秉章)	
2006	Trimming Success	飛短留長父子兵	Pang Gan (彭根)	
2006	Men in Pain	男人之苦	Ko Wai (高威)	
2006	Land of Wealth	匯通天下	Tsui Wing-wai (徐永懷)	
2006	Dicey Business	賭場風雲	Yung Hon-cheung (翁漢昌)	
2006	The Slicing of the Demon	凶城計中計	To Yut-fu (屠一夫)	
2007	The Brink of Law	突圍行動	Tung Chin-pang (童展鵬)	
2007	The Green Grass of Home	緣來自有機	Choi Chik-hei (蔡積喜)	
2007	Phoenix Rising	蘭花劫	Cheung Ying-ging (張應景)	
2007	Best Selling Secrets	同事三分親	Dai Kam (戴金)	
2007	Word Twisters' Adventures	鐵咀銀牙	Duan Tin-fu (段天虎)	
2008	Catch Me Now	原來愛上賊	Lau Yiu-chiu (劉宇超)	
2008	The Money-Maker Recipe	師奶股神	Szeto Luen-fai (司徒聯輝)	
2008	The Four	少年四大名捕	Teet Foo (鐵斧)	
2008	Forensic Heroes II	法證先鋒II	Ma Kam-to (馬錦濤)	
2008	Love Exchange	疑情別戀	Ling Siu-ming (凌兆銘)	
2008	Last One Standing	與敵同行	Tsang Tsu-leung (曾樹樑)	
2009	In the Chamber of Bliss	蔡鍔與小鳳仙	Yuen Sai-hoi (袁世凱)	
2009	Off Pedder	畢打自己人	Lung Bo (龍波)	
2010	In the Eye of the Beholder	秋香怒點唐伯虎	Ha Hau-suen (夏侯純)	
2010	The Mysteries of Love	談情說案	Tsui Hon-fei (徐漢飛)	
2010	Ghost Writer	蒲松齡	Ling Wu Gat-cheung (令狐吉祥)	
2010	A Pillow Case of Mystery II	施公奇案II	General Ting Yan-chuen (丁仁川)	
2010	Growing Through Life	摘星之旅	Cheung Wah (張華)	
2010	Gun Metal Grey	刑警	Ko Lap-yan (高立仁)	
2011	Grace Under Fire	女拳	Mok Ping (莫平)	
2011	Be Home for Dinner	誰家灶頭無煙火	Ko Yan (高仁)	
2011	Relic of an Emissary	洪武三十二	Chu Yuen-cheung (朱元璋)	
2011	Yes, Sir. Sorry, Sir!	點解阿Sir係阿Sir	Chiang Hung (蔣洪)	
2011	The Life and Times of a Sentinel	紫禁驚雷	Nalan Mingzhu (納蘭·明珠)	
2011	Forensic Heroes III	法證先鋒III	Chiu Tai-lung (趙大龍)	
2012	The Greatness of a Hero	盛世仁傑	Cho Chin-hang (曹展鏗)	
2012	Witness Insecurity	護花危情	Yung Siu-bong (翁瑞邦)	
2012	Tiger Cubs	飛虎	Yue Sai-tong (俞世棠)	
2012	Three Kingdoms RPG	回到三國	Cho Cho (曹操)	
2012	Highs and Lows	雷霆掃毒	Cheng Tse-sing (鄭志成)	
2012	Missing You	幸福摩天輪	Hui Ming-tak/Hui Yuk-on (許明德/許玉安)	
2013	The Day of Days	初五啟市錄	Wong Kai-hiu (汪繼堯)	
2013	Cupid Stupid	戀愛星求人	Cheung Wong (張旺)	
2013	Reality Check	心路GPS	Cheung Wong (張旺)	
2013	A Great Way to Care II	仁心解碼II	Chu Hok-lai (朱學禮)	
2014	Outbound Love	單戀雙城	Sky Mak Kwai Tin (麥貫天)	
2014	Ruse of Engagement	叛逃	Kiu Kim-hang (喬劍亨)	
2014	ICAC Investigators 2014	廉政行動2014	Leung Ho-tin (梁浩天)	
2014	The Ultimate Addiction	點金勝手	Sin Cho Wai (冼祖偉)	
2014	Ghost Dragon of Cold Mountain	寒山潛龍	Hung Fung (熊峰)	
2014	Shades of Life	我們的天空	Frankie	
2014	Line Walker	使徒行者	Keith Kwok Teng (郭正)	
2014	Come On, Cousin	老表，你好hea！	Chan Yee Shan father (陳綺姍爸爸)	
2014	Officer Geomancer	八卦神探	Ha Man Zik (夏文值)	
2015	Eye in the Sky	天眼	Szeto Kwok-keung (司徒國強)	
2015	Romantic Repertoire	水髮胭脂	Lin Kei-keung (連其祥)	
2015	Captain of Destiny	張保仔	Cheng Yat (鄭一)	
2015	Under the Veil	無雙譜	Scholar Hung (洪太史)	
2015	The Executioner	刀下留人	Fa Choi-san (花在山)	
2016	Over Run Over	EU超時任務	Ling Hoi (凌海)	
2016	My Dangerous Mafia Retirement Plan	火線下的江湖大佬	Liu Kwok-on (廖國安)	
2017	Provocateur	與諜同謀	陸一凡	
2017	Come Home Love: Lo and Behold	愛·回家之開心速遞	龍敢威	
2017	Legal Mavericks	踩过界	文根鹰	
2017	My Dearly Sinful Mind	心理追兇 Mind Hunter	胡貴成	
2018	Who Wants a Baby?	BB来了	唐秋	

==== Asia Television (ATV) ====
Year	English Title	Chinese Title	Role	Notes
1979	Lovers Arrow	情人箭	Chin Mung-bak (展夢白)	
1979	It Takes A Thief	俠盜風流	Yat-dim-hung (江湖一點紅)	
1979	Reincarnated	天蠶變	Luk Dan (陸丹)	
1979	Dragon Strikes	天龍訣	Luk Dan (陸丹)	
1980	On The Waterfront	湖海爭霸錄	Tit Gwok (鐵角)	
1980	Dynasty	大內群英	Mo Ming (無名)	
1980	Fatherland	大地恩情	Yung Cheung (容昌)	
1980	Dynasty II	大內群英續集	White Brow (白眉道长)	
1980	The Tai-Chi Master	太極張三豐	Chu Chung-bat (朱重八)	
1983	101 Citizen Arrest	101拘捕令	Tsui Dai Wa	
1984	Forget Me Not	毋忘我	Zhuang Ping (莊平)	
1985	Return of the Undercover	四大名捕重出江湖	Lang Huet	

==== Commercial Television (CTV) ====
Year	English Title	Chinese Title	Role	Notes
1976	The Legend of the Condor Heroes	射雕英雄傳	Lo Yau-kiuk (魯有腳)	
1976	The Return of the Condor Heroes	神鵰俠侶	Yeung Kuo (楊過)	
1977	Dream of the Red Chamber	紅樓夢	Bui Ming (焙茗)	
1977	Baifa Monü Zhuan	白髮魔女傳	岳鳴柯	
1977	The Magic Crane	仙鶴神針	Ma Kwan-mo (馬君武)	
1978	Meteor, Butterfly, Sword	流星蝴蝶劍	Meng Sing-wan (孟星魂)	
1978	Knight of the Gold Sword	金刀情俠		
