= Legal Entanglement =

Hong Kong television series

- Official poster
- 法網伊人
- Genre: Legal drama
- Screenplay by: Chu King-kei; Law Kam-fai; Lau Choi-wan; Yip Sai-hong; Chan Long; Chan Chi-ho; Yip Koon-wah
- Directed by: So Man-chung; Chung Kwok-keung; Leung Kwok-pan; Ng Ka-kan; Wong Chiu-yan
- Starring: Hacken Lee; Kenix Kwok; Michael Tse; Elaine Ng
- Theme music composer: Lee Shih Shiong
- Opening theme: Unknowingly Fell in Love with You (不知不覺愛上你) by Hacken Lee
- Country of origin: Hong Kong
- Original language: Cantonese
- No. of episodes: 22

Production
- Producer: Tam Long-cheung
- Production location: Hong Kong
- Camera setup: Multi camera
- Running time: 45 minutes
- Production company: TVB

Original release
- Network: TVB Jade
- Release: 18 February – 17 March 2002

Legal Entanglement
- Traditional Chinese: 法網伊人
- Simplified Chinese: 法网伊人
Transcriptions
Standard Mandarin
- Hanyu Pinyin: Fǎ Wǎng Yī Rén
Yue: Cantonese
- Jyutping: Faat3 Mong2 Ji1 Jan4

Legal Entanglement is a 2002 Hong Kong legal drama television series produced by TVB and starring Hacken Lee, Kenix Kwok, Michael Tse and Elaine Ng.

== Synopsis ==
Sammi Shum (Kenix Kwok) quits her studies and marries a tycoon's son, Raymond Lam (Lee Wai-kei), despite her father's (Chor Yuen) objection. At first, she feels like a princess living in a fairy tale, until she discovers her husband is having an affair. She wakes up from her dream and finds that the reality is that she is suffering from post-natal depression She loses the custody of her son, QQ, after divorcing her husband. Luckily, her friend Yip Heung-fai (Stephen Au) finds her an assistant job in a law firm. She works hard and resumes her unfinished law degree hoping that she will get her son back.

When everything settles down, she meets Mark Ko (Hacken Lee) who represented her husband for her son's case and is now her boss. He does not remember her. She is aggressive towards him and that confuses him. Eventually, they understand each other more and love sparks between them. Meanwhile, her son reappears.

== Cast ==
- Hacken Lee as Mark Ko (高志朗), an aggressive lawyer who likes challenging difficulty. He is the newly joined partner of LC Firm and an old friend of one of the partners, Joe Yeung. While Sammi was battling for the custody of her child in the past, Mark represented her ex-husband, Raymond, on court and using psychologist's report as evidence, accused Sammi for having mental problems and thus, causing her to lose custody of her child. When Mark joins LC Firm, Sammi acts cold towards him while he does not recognize her. Although Mark initially sees Sammi as stubborn, he later appreciates her hardworking attitude.
- Kenix Kwok as Sammi Shum (沈學儀), an office assistant in LC Firm. Sammi is the daughter of retired judge, Shum Kiu, and is pressured by her father's expectations. When Sammi meets and falls in love rich heir, Raymond Lam, in her second year of college and loses her career ambitions, she marries Raymond under her father's objection only to find her husband was cheating on her while she was pregnant. Their marriage ends in divorce and she loses the custody of her son when Raymond hires Mark as his lawyer. Sammi became depressed and wanted to suicide but her good friend, Yip Heung-fai, encourages her to get back on her feet and she gets a job a LC Firm while also studying law as a part-time student. When she re-encounters Mark, she initially disagreed with his methods but she eventually grows to admire his professional techniques and realizes his righteousness.
- Michael Tse as Joe Yeung (楊明), one of the partners of LC Firm, a wise lawyer whom is highly knowledgeable and specializes in battling difficult cases, especially discrimination cases. However, Joe lacks self-confidence due to shortcomings in his looks and weird behaviors, and is often ridiculed by law firm partner Martha Chan. Joe had a secret crush on Sammi and when he was brave enough to confess to her, Sammi rejects him. While feeling dejected, Joe realized that Martha has feelings for him, much to his disbelief, making him feel flattered.
- Elaine Ng as Martha Chan (陳小玲), one of the partners of LC Firm, she holds a lofty stance and is very harsh and lacks the spirit of sharing. She only pursues men who looking matching for her. Martha often ridicules Joe for his weird behaviors but when she was cheated by her boyfriend, Dick Yuen, Joe admonishes her and she starts to admire Joe's wisdom. Eventually, Martha develops feelings for Joe and uses every possible way to hint her feelings, but Joe is reluctant to start a relationship with her due to his lack of self-confidence. Martha, however, later manages to move Joe by her sincerity.
- Shek Sau as Kwan Chun-ting (關振霆), Mark's mentor whom Mark holds a grudge against as Mark believes Chun-ting was the reason his parents divorced, which also caused Mark to not believe in marriage. Chun-ting eventually reconciled with Mark when the latter realized that Chun-ting truly loved his mother, Cheung Lai-fong, and the reason for his parents' divorce was because of his father's constant physical abuse of Lai-fong.
- Stephen Au as Yip Heung-fai (葉向輝), a private investigator and Sammi's good friend who helped her during her hardest times. Heung-fai used to be a police sergeant but resigned as he refused to partake with his corrupt colleagues. Later when he was assigned to investigate prosecutor Tracy Fong, he develops feeling for her, but believes that she would not accept him due to their difference in social status.
- Patricia Liu as Tracy Fong (方潔華), a prosecutor of the Department of Justice. Tracy is very generous and modest, and can be inspiring to others. She came from a poor family where she had to care for her sickly mother and younger siblings during her youth. As a result, she became a mistress of a rich businessman and once signed a contract with Mark's law firm. She later became Chun-ting's pupil before entering the DOJ. She initially thought Mark would discriminate her due to her past. As a prosecutor, she often debates with Mark on court, but outside of work, they often talk with each other. She and Mark briefly dated before Mark realized his heart really belonged to Sammi.
- Josephine Lam as Lee Wai-miu (李慧苗), an office staff in LC Firm who is in her late 30s and has never dated anyone. She was involved in a defamation case when she enters a hotel with cafe owner, Chiu Mo-wai, who claimed they had a one-night stand together while in actuality, nothing happened. With Joe as her representing lawyer, she won her case, but she also took pity in Chung Hok-cheung, Chiu's representative lawyer and they develop a relationship.
- Ram Cheung as Kan Wing-lim (簡永廉), an officer assistant in LC Firm whom also speaks with exaggerated words and is somewhat of a comic relief. He is also Heung-fai's older brother-in-law
- Myolie Wu as Toby To (杜比比), Sammi's friend and roommate who is a journalist. She also has a secret crush on Heung-fai.
- Chor Yuen as Shum Kiu (沈喬), a retired judge whom is Sammi's estranged father. He had high expectations for his daughter and has already planned her future of sending her to study law in England. When Sammi becomes pregnant and marries with Raymond, Kiu falls out with her daughter and immigrates to England and the two have never spoken to each other since.
- Yvonne Lam as Cheung Lai-fong (張麗芳), Mark's mother and Chun-ting's girlfriend. When she was married to Mark's father, she was constantly abused by him, something that Mark did not realize until a time when she collapsed at her home, which led Mark to falsely believe that Chun-tung was the one that abused her.
- Lee Wai-kei as Raymond Lam (林偉文), a rich heir and Sammi's ex-husband. When Sammi was pregnant, he cheated on her with Sammi's best friend.
- Jason Lam as Jameson Tse (謝偉), a lawyer
- Pal Sinn as Dick Yuen (袁家俊), an arrogant film star and Martha's ex-boyfriend. He later turns out to be bisexual and also cheats on Martha.

== Awards and nominations ==
Award	Category	Recipient	Result	Top 5
TVB Anniversary Awards 2002	My Favourite Actor in a Leading Role	Hacken Lee	Nominated	—
TVB Anniversary Awards 2002	My Favourite Actor in a Leading Role	Michael Tse	Nominated	—
TVB Anniversary Awards 2002	My Favourite Actress in a Leading Role	Kenix Kwok	Nominated	Entered
TVB Anniversary Awards 2002	My Favourite Actress in a Leading Role	Elaine Ng	Nominated	—
TVB Anniversary Awards 2002	My Favourite Vastly Improved Actress	Myolie Wu	Nominated	
TVB Anniversary Awards 2002	My Favourite Vastly Improved Actress	Patricia Liu	Nominated	
TVB Anniversary Awards 2002	My Favourite On-Screen Partners (Dramas)	Hacken Lee, Kenix Kwok	Nominated	
TVB Anniversary Awards 2002	My Favourite On-Screen Partners (Dramas)	Michael Tse, Elaine Ng	Nominated	
TVB Anniversary Awards 2002	My Top Favourite Television Characters	Hacken Lee	Won	
TVB Anniversary Awards 2002	My Top Favourite Television Characters	Kenix Kwok	Won	
