= Patricia Liu =

Hong Kong actress

- Liu in 2007
- Born: Hong Kong
- Other names: Patricia Joma, Patricia Lau
- Occupation: Actress

Chinese name
- Chinese: 劉綽琪
- Traditional Chinese: 劉綽琪
Transcriptions
Standard Mandarin
- Hanyu Pinyin: Liú Chuòqí

Patricia Liu (Chinese: 劉綽琪) is a Hong Kong actress.

== Career ==
In 1997, Liu was a beauty pageant finalist of Miss Hong Kong 1997 without winning any award.

Liu became an actress and joined TVB. Liu first received wide attention as host of The Rhino Club, and she is amongst the last to host TVB's K-100. Her TV dramas include War and Beauty and When Rules Turn Loose (2005).

Patricia joined ATV in 2006. She was at the 49th ATV anniversary aired on 27 May 2006 and also appeared in the audience along with all ATV actors watching the ATV The 12th Annual Most Popular TV Commercial Awards aired 22 April 2006.

At the start of 2008, Patricia left ATV and is now residing in Los Angeles for personal reasons. She has been in a few commercials, ads and short films in the short time she has been in the United States.

== Filmography ==
=== Film ===
- Undying Love (2006)
- Kung Fu Mahjong 3 (2007)
- Take Her Picture (2010, short film) as Ling
- The Scarlet Worm (2011) as Molly
- Pretty Rosebud (2014) as Mei Li

=== Television series ===
- A Kindred Spirit (1999), TVB
- Anti-Crime Squad (1999), TVB
- Police Station No.7 (1999), TVB
- Epic drama (1999), TVB
- At the Threshold of an Era (2000), TVB
- Healing Hands II (2000), TVB
- Reaching Out (2000), TVB
- Lost in Love (2000), TVB
- FM701 (2000), TVB
- Ups and Downs (2000), TVB
- Legal Entanglement (2001), TVB
- Invisible Journey (2001), TVB
- The Trust of a Lifetime (2001), TVB
- Golden Faith (2001), TVB
- Street Fighters (2002), TVB
- Armed Reaction II (2002), TVB
- Find the Light (2003), TVB
- Hearts of Fencing (2003), TVB
- Greed Mask (2003), TVB
- Hard Fate (2004), TVB
- To Catch the Uncatchable (2004), TVB
- Hidden Treasures (2004), TVB
- Sunshine Heartbeat (2004), TVB
- War and Beauty (2004), TVB
- When Rules Turn Loose (2005), TVB
- Trimming Success (2006), TVB
- CIB Files (2006), TVB
- Forensic Heroes (2006), TVB
- Walled Village (2006), ATV
- Relentless Justice (aka No Turning Back) (2006), ATV
- Devil's Disciples (2007), TVB
- The Men of Justice (2010), ATV

=== Television show ===
- Mark Six (1998–2000), TVB
- City Focus (1998–2000), TVB
- Culture Plaza (1998–2001), TVB
- Rhino Club 1 & 2 (2001), TVB
- Travel Catalog (2002), TVB
- Music Programs (2002–2003), TVB
- K-100 (2003–2005), TVB
- Police Magazine (2004–2006), RTHK
- DNA (2006), ATV
- My Studio (2007), ATV
