= Highs and Lows =

Hong Kong television series

- Highs and Lows
- Also known as: Fight Crime
- 雷霆掃毒
- Genre: Crime thriller Action
- Created by: Lam Chi-wah
- Written by: Leung Yan-tung; Yip Tin-sing
- Starring: Michael Miu; Raymond Lam; Kate Tsui; Elaine Ng; Ella Koon; Ben Wong; Jin Au-yeung; Derek Kok; Law Lok-lam; Alex Lam
- Opening theme: Theme of Highs and Lows
- Ending theme: Yau Chi Yuen (幼稚完) by Raymond Lam (Episodes 2, 4, 6-9, 12-20, 22-24, 26-30)
- Composer: Tang Chi Wai
- Country of origin: Hong Kong
- Original language: Cantonese
- No. of episodes: 30

Production
- Producer: Lam Chi-wah
- Production location: Hong Kong
- Camera setup: Multi camera
- Running time: 45 mins (each)
- Production company: TVB

Original release
- Network: Jade; HD Jade
- Release: 24 September – 4 November 2012

Related
- Divas in Distress; The Confidant

Highs and Lows
- intertitle
- Traditional Chinese: 雷霆掃毒
- Simplified Chinese: 雷霆扫毒
- Literal meaning: "thunderous drug raid"
Transcriptions
Standard Mandarin
- Hanyu Pinyin: Lèi Tìng Sǎo Dú
Yue: Cantonese
- Jyutping: Leoi4 Ting4 Sou3 Duk6

Highs and Lows (Chinese: 雷霆掃毒) is a Hong Kong television crime drama serial produced by TVB under executive producer Lam Chi-wah. The drama stars Michael Miu, Raymond Lam, Kate Tsui, Elaine Ng, Ella Koon, and Ben Wong. It originally aired from 24 September to 4 November 2012, on Hong Kong's Jade, and ran for 30 episodes.

== Synopsis ==
As a Senior Inspector of the Narcotics Bureau Operation Unit, Gordon Heung (Michael Miu) profoundly abhors evil. He and Wai Sai-Lok (Raymond Lam) – Senior Inspector of the Intelligence Unit – have closely co-operated with each other as peer mentors, frequently solving drug trafficking cases for the Police Force. During an operation to knock down the targets, Sai-Lok discovers clues that Gordon is most likely the corrupt cop in a collusion conspiracy with drug dealers. Apart from launching a secret investigation into Gordon, Sai-Lok is also alienated from him by the evil-willed Chief Inspector of the Operation Unit – Brian Poon (Ben Wong). Having undergone various disputes against each other, the long-term brotherly relationship between Sai-Lok and Gordon appears full of contradictions.

Meanwhile, following an investigation, Sai-Lok falls in love with a snitch – Pat Chan (Kate Tsui), who suffers from low self-esteem due to her humble beginning. Deliberately denying her affection to Sai-Lok, Pat gives up on him so that his secret admirer – Sandy Ko (Ella Koon), a rookie police officer – can have the chance, leading to a subtle relationship among the three. Feeling life is so dreary, Pat ultimately digs her own grave by becoming a new generation of drug dealers, involved in drug trafficking and provoking the police force. With intense sorrow, Sai-Lok then joins forces with Gordon against Pat, waging a chain of bitter battles.

== Production ==
A trailer for the TVB 2012 Sales Presentation trailer was shot earlier during October 2011 and the Sales Presentation was aired on 17 December 2011. The trailer featured Roger Kwok, Michael Miu, Kevin Cheng, Kate Tsui, and Joyce Tang. Kwok portrayed a triad mole sent to the Narcotics Bureau (NB), Miu portrayed an undercover cop from NB, Cheng portrayed an NB officer, Tsui portrayed a pregnant drug dealer and Tang portrayed Miu's wife. Kwok, Cheng and Tang were unable to film due to conflicting schedules. As a result, Elaine Ng, Raymond Lam, and Ella Koon were added. A costume ceremony was held on 18 January 2012 at Tseung Kwan O TVB City Studio One at 12:30 p.m.

== Cast ==
=== Main cast ===
Cast	Role	Description
Michael Miu	Heung Wing (Gordon) 向榮	NB Operational Unit Senior Inspector (SIP); Undercover Cop in Episodes 1-3; Helen's ex-husband, later reconciled Best friends with Ho Kwai, Cheng Chi Seng and Nin Yau Fu; Betrayed the police because of brotherhood but still a righteous cop in the end Killed by Wai Sai Lok unintentionally in Episode 30
Raymond Lam	Wai Sai Lok (Happy) 韋世樂	NB Intelligence Unit Senior Inspector (SIP); Poon Hok Lai's rival Pursues and loves Chan Ka Pik; Ko Hei Suen's superior and good friend Ko Hei Suen's love interest Killed Gordon in Episode 30 unintentionally Raises Chan Ka Pik & Poon Hok Lai's son in Episode 30
Kate Tsui	Chan Ka Pik (Pat) 陳家碧	Bar fist gamer, later drug dealer for revenge Chan Ka Jun's sister Loves Wai Sai Lok and also his love interest Ko Hei Suen's love rival and good friend Died after giving birth to Poon Hok Lai's son and getting shot by Poon Hok Lai while trying to protect Wai Sai Lok in Episode 30
Elaine Ng	Madam Yu (Helen) 于詠彤	NB Financial Investigation Unit Chief Inspector (CIP); Gordon's ex-wife but later reconciled Ivan's girlfriend, but later broke up Married Gordon at his funeral Ko Hei Suen's cousin
Ella Koon	Ko Hei Suen (Sandy) 高希璇	NB Intelligence Unit Officer; Loves Wai Sai Lok; Poon Hok Lai's love interest Chan Ka Pik's love rival and good friend Helen's cousin Promoted to Operation Unit Inspector (IP) in Episode 30
Ben Wong	Poon Hok Lai (Brian) 潘學禮	Main Villain; Former OCTB Senior Inspector. Promoted to Operation Unit Chief Inspector in episode 3 Esther's ex-boyfriend Wai Sai Lok's rival Pursued Ko Hei Suen then later gave up Leaves police force in Episode 25, became 2nd "Agent"; Killed Ng Dak Tim in Episode 29; Misled Wai Sai Lok to kill Gordon in Ep 30; Used and killed Chan Ka Pik during Episodes 27-30; Died in an explosion in Episode 30; Discovered he had an accidental son with Chan Ka Pik in Episode 30; Gordon's employer Ep 26-30

=== Other cast ===
Cast	Role	Description
Jin Au-yeung	Ng Dak Tim (沙膽添) 吳德添	Chan Ka Pik's best friend. Likes Chan Ka Pik. Died in Ep 29 after being pushed off a building by Poon Hok Lai after failing to assassinate him.
Derek Kok	Ho Kwai (阿鬼) 何葵	Operation Unit officer. Best friends with Gordon, Cheng Chi Seng, and Nin Yau Fu. Threatened by "Agent" to work as a "dirty" cop. Rescued by Gordon before he was killed by "Agent"'s assassin in Episode 24. Kills "Agent" and his assassin, but eventually commits suicide because of his refusal to surrender himself in Episode 25.
Law Lok Lam (羅樂林)	Cheng Chi Seng (準哥) 鄭志成	Operation Unit officer. Best friends with Gordon, Ho Kwai and Nin Yau Fu. Surrendered and went to jail in Episode 30.
Alex Lam (林子善)	Nin Yau Fu (數據富) 年有富	Operation Unit officer. Best friends with Gordon, Ho Kwai, and Cheng Chi Seng. Esther's boyfriend. Surrendered and went to jail in Episode 30.
Jack Hui		Operation Wing officer
Ho Kwan Sing (何君誠)		CIB officer
Patrick Dunn(鄧梓峰)		Senior Superintendent of Police and head of NB.
Yeung Ching Wah (楊證樺)		CIB officer
Lam King Kong (林敬剛)		CIB officer
Kayi Cheung		Operation Wing officer
Hugo Wong (黃子衡)	Lee Kei Ching 李紀正	NB officer
Max Cheung (張達倫)		CIB officer
Kirby Lam (林秀怡)		Finance officer
Lily Ho	Poon Hok Lai's mother	Sells ice cream
Lily Leung (梁舜燕)	Gordon's mother	
Eileen Yeow	Ho Kwai's wife	
Ho Chun Hin(何俊軒)		
Yu Chi Ming (余子明)	Poon Hok Lai's father	Sells ice cream
Bryant Mak (麥子樂)	Chan Ka Jun 陳家俊	Chan Ka Pik's younger brother who killed in Ep 20.
Lily Ho (何傲兒)	Esther	Poon Hok Lai's Ex Girlfriend later gets back together but breaks up again due to Poon using her for sexual pleasures. Nin Yau Fu's girlfriend.
Ko Chun Man (高俊文)	Chan Ka Pik's father	Took on drugs. Sold drugs to Chan Ka Pik's best friend Jenny which led to her death. Later, he was murdered in jail by the orders of Poon Hok Lai while serving sentences on his drug dealing activities.
Rosanne Lui (呂珊)		Cheung Chi Seng's wife
Yiu Ho Ching (姚浩政)		
Geoffrey Wong (黃子雄)	Ivan	Helen's boyfriend, but later broke up. Participated in dealing with illegal proceeds. Killed by Helen when she tried to rescue Gordon.
Rainbow Ching (程可為)	Ko Hei Suen's mother	
Oscar Leung	Chong Chuk-yuen (莊卓源)	Guest Stars NB officers Ko Hei-shuen's subordinates in episode 30 (see "Tiger Cubs")
Him Law	Yu Hok-lai (俞學禮)	Guest Stars NB officers Ko Hei-shuen's subordinates in episode 30 (see "Tiger Cubs")
Vincent Wong	Yau Chun-hin (邱駿軒)	Guest Stars NB officers Ko Hei-shuen's subordinates in episode 30 (see "Tiger Cubs")
Benjamin Yuen	Tse Kar-sing (謝家星)	Guest Stars NB officers Ko Hei-shuen's subordinates in episode 30 (see "Tiger Cubs")

== Awards and nominations ==
- Nominated – My AOD Favourites Award for My Favourite Supporting Actor (Ben Wong)
- Won – 2012 TVB Anniversary Award for Most Popular Female Character (Kate Tsui)
- Nominated – 2012 TVB Anniversary Award for Best Drama

== Viewership ratings ==
The following is a table that includes a list of the total ratings points based on television viewership.

Week	Originally Aired	Episodes	Average Points	Peaking Points	References
1	24–28 September 2012	1 – 5	29	—	
2	1–5 October 2012	6 – 10	29	—	
3	8–12 October 2012	11 – 15	31	—	
4	15–18 October 2012	16 – 19	30	—	
5	23–26 October 2012	20 – 23	29	—	
6	29 October – 2 November 2012	24 – 28	30	—	
6	4 November 2012	29 – 30	35	38	

== International Broadcast ==
- Malaysia – NTV7
- Singapore – Mediacorp Channel U and Mediacorp Channel 8
- Vietnam – HTV2
