= Collected Cases of Injustice Rectified =

Song dynasty handbook of forensic science

- Traditional Chinese: 洗冤集錄
- Simplified Chinese: 洗冤集录
Transcriptions
Standard Mandarin
- Hanyu Pinyin: Xǐyuān Jílù
Yue: Cantonese
- Jyutping: sai2 jyun1 zaap6 luk6

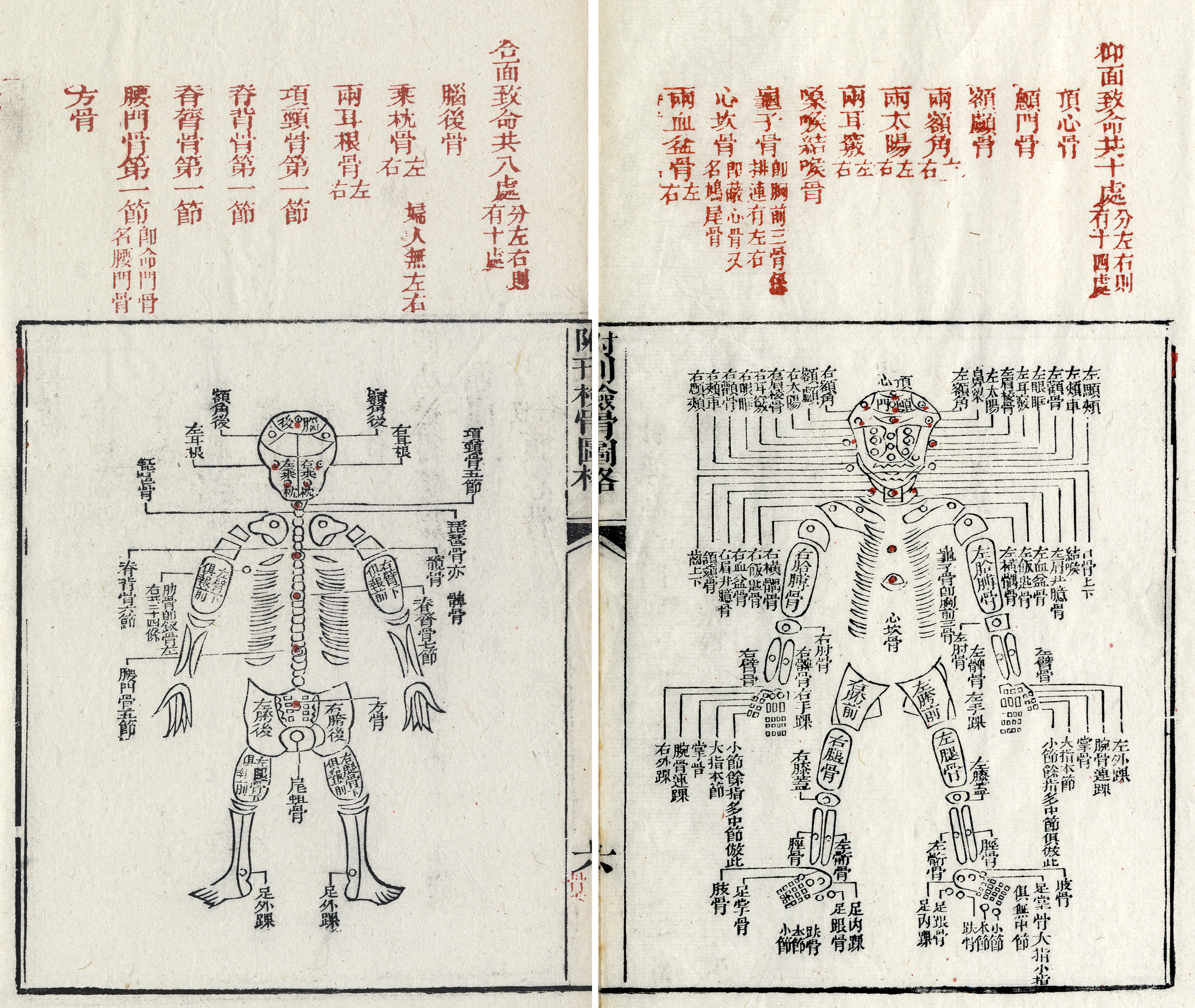
Nomenclature of human bones in Sòng Cí: Xǐ-yuān lù jí-zhèng, edited by Ruǎn Qíxīn (1843).

Collected Cases of Injustice Rectified or The Washing Away of Wrongs is a Chinese book written by Song Ci in 1247 during the Song dynasty (960–1276) as a handbook for coroners. The author combined many historical cases of forensic science with his own experiences and wrote the book with an eye to avoiding injustice. The book was esteemed by generations of officials, and it was eventually translated into English, German, Japanese, French and other languages.

It is the first ever written book of forensic science.

== Content ==
Different versions of the book exist, but the earliest existing version was published during the Yuan dynasty, containing fifty-three chapters in five volumes. The first volume describes the imperial decree issued by the Song dynasty on the inspection of bodies and injuries. The second volume contains notes and methods on postmortem examinations. The third, fourth, and fifth volumes detail the appearances of corpses from various causes of death and methods of treatment to certain injuries of a wounded person.

Topics that Song Ci commented on in the book include the regulations for preparing autopsy reports for the courts, how to protect the evidence in the examining process, and the reasons why workers should show impartiality during examinations; he also provided descriptions on how to wash dead bodies to determine different causes of death. The book was notable for having given methods to distinguish between suicide and death from other causes.

In the book, Song writes:

The particulars of each case must be recorded in the doctor’s own handwriting. No one else is allowed to write his autopsy report. A coroner must not avoid performing an autopsy just because he detests the stench of corpses. A coroner must refrain from sitting comfortably behind a curtain of incense that masks the stench, letting his subordinates do the autopsy unsupervised, or allowing a petty official to write his autopsy report, otherwise any potential inaccuracy is unchecked and uncorrected.

He also writes:

Should there be any inaccuracy in an autopsy report, injustice would remain with the deceased as well as the living. A wrongful death sentence without justice may claim one or more additional lives, which would in turn result in feuds and revenges, prolonging the tragedy. In order to avoid any miscarriage of justice, the coroner must immediately examine the case personally.

== Importance to the history of forensic entomology ==
In The Washing Away of Wrongs (an alternative translated title of the same book), the first documented forensic entomology case is reported. In 1235 A.D., a stabbing occurred in a Chinese village. By testing different blades on an animal carcass, it was determined that the wound was caused by a sickle. After further questioning, the investigator had all villagers bring their sickles and lay them out before the crowd. Blow flies were attracted to a single sickle because invisible remnants of blood and tissue still adhered to it. The owner of the alleged sickle later broke down and confessed the crime. In other areas of the text, the author demonstrates knowledge of blow fly activity on bodies relative to those orifices infested, the time of infestation, and the effect of trauma on attractiveness of tissue to such insects.

Brian McKnight describes the murder case involving the sickle as thus:

A local peasant from a Chinese village was found murdered, hacked to death by a hand sickle. The use of a sickle, a tool used by peasants to cut the rice at harvest time, suggested that another local peasant worker had committed the murder. The local magistrate began the investigation by calling all the local peasants who could be suspects into the village square. Each was to carry their hand sickles to the town square with them. Once assembled, the magistrate ordered the ten-or-so suspects to place their hand sickles on the ground in front of them and then step back a few yards. The afternoon sun was warm and as the villagers, suspects, and magistrates waited, bright shiny metallic green flies began to buzz around them in the village square. The shiny metallic colored flies then began to focus in on one of the hand sickles lying on the ground. Within just a few minutes many had landed on the hand sickle and were crawling over it with interest. None of the other hand sickles had attracted any of these pretty flies. The owner of the tool became very nervous, and it was only a few more moments before all those in the village knew who the murderer was. With head hung in shame and pleading for mercy, the magistrate led the murderer away. The witnesses of the murder were the brightly metallic colored flies known as the blow flies which had been attracted to the remaining bits of soft tissue, blood, bone and hair which had stuck to the hand sickle after the murder was committed. The knowledge of the village magistrate as to a specific insect group's behavior regarding their attraction to dead human tissue was the key to solving this violent act and justice was served in ancient China.

== English translations ==
- In 1855 Dr. Harland published the Records of Washing away of Injuries in Hong Kong
- In 1924 sinologist H.A. Giles published The Hsi Yüan Lu, or Instructions to Coroners.
- In 1981 D. Brian E. McKnight published The Washing Away of Wrongs: Forensic Medicine in Thirteenth-Century China.

== See also ==
- List of Chinese physicians
- Witness to a Prosecution, a TVB drama about Song Ci.
