= Joseph Ma =

Joseph Ma may refer to:

- Ma Xiangbo (1840–1939), Chinese Roman Catholic priest and scholar
- Joseph Ma Zhongmu (1919–2020), Chinese Roman Catholic bishop
- Joseph Ma Xue-sheng (1923–2013), Chinese Roman Catholic bishop
- Joseph Ma Yinglin (born 1965), Chinese Roman Catholic bishop

== See also ==
- Joe Ma (disambiguation)
