= Triumph Over Evil =

Hong Kong television series

- 真命天師
- Genre: Costume drama Action; Fantasy; Horror; Supernatural
- Created by: Siu Hin-fai
- Written by: Ng Lap Kwong
- Starring: Ben Wong; Nick Cheung; Hilary Tsui; Joyce Tang; Jay Lau; Chor Yuen
- Theme music composer: Chung Hing Hung
- Opening theme: In Life (人生中) by Patrick Tam
- Ending theme: Only One Possible (只得一個可能) by Patrick Tam and Maggie Tziong
- Composer: Dennie Wong
- Country of origin: Hong Kong
- Original language: Cantonese
- No. of episodes: 15 (Hong Kong); 20 (Overseas)

Production
- Producer: Siu Hin-fai
- Production location: Hong Kong
- Camera setup: Multi camera
- Production company: TVB

Original release
- Network: Jade
- Release: 22 December 1997 – 9 January 1998

Triumph Over Evil
- Traditional Chinese: 真命天師
- Simplified Chinese: 真命天师
- Literal meaning: "Destiny Master"
Transcriptions
Standard Mandarin
- Hanyu Pinyin: Zhēn Mìng Tián Shī
Yue: Cantonese
- Jyutping: Zan1 Ming6 Tin1 Si1

Triumph Over Evil is a 1997 Hong Kong period serial drama produced by TVB and starring Ben Wong in his first leading role and co-starring Nick Cheung and Hilary Tsui.

== Plot ==
Nin (Ben Wong), a humble and low-ranking official, accidentally killed the evil monk's foster son when he tried to arrest the fiddler Tin (Nick Cheung). Nin then discovered that he was destined to fight against the spirits and demons. But what he really wants is to marry the girl of his dreams, Ching Ching (Joyce Tang). The evil monk then sent his apprentice Ho Po Chi (Jay Lau) to befriend with Tin in disguise. Nin was always at risk but fortunately saved by Yuen Tan Chi (Hilary Tsui).

At the time when Nin decided to take on the mission and fight against the demons, he had to speed up himself with the magic arts and kung fu ...

== Cast ==
- Ben Wong as Lin Nin (連年)
- Nick Cheung as Cheung Chan Tin (張震天)
- Hilary Tsui as Yuen Tan Chi (玄丹子)
- Joyce Tang as Lung Ching Ching (龍菁菁)
- Jay Lau as Ho Po Chi (荷抱子)
- Chor Yuen as Taoist priest Miu (妙道士)
- Cheung Ying Choi as Master Cheung (張天師)
- Kong Hon as Kau Koon To (久觀道)
- Mak Chi Wan as Householder Wong Lung (王龍居士)
- Joseph Lee as Disabled Sky Son (殘天子)
- Daniel Kwok as Lack Ground Son (缺地子)
- Damen Law as Broken Tak Son (破德子)
- Wong Chung Chi as Taoist priest Lok (落道士)
- Mak Ka Lun as Nam (阿南)
- Law Kwok Wai as Lung Fuk (龍福)
- Lau Kwai Fong as Mrs. Lung (龍夫人)
- Dragon Li as Ling Pak (連百)
- Poon Pik Seung as Mother Lin (連母)
- Chan Min Leung as Miu Chuk (廟祝)
- Law Lan as Granny Cheung (張婆婆)
- Lu Yuk Ming as Store owner (店主)
- Martin Lau as Employee (小二)
- Wong Yeuk Yee as Chun To (春桃)
- Chan Chung Kin as Village leader (村長)
- Elton Loo as Fat Pa Chi (肥巴子)
- Suen Kwai Hing as Old Taoist priest (老道士)
- Ng Man Sang as Ming (明)
- Tong Chun Ming as Kwong (光)
- Cheung Hak as Tung (東)
- Wah Chung Nam as District official (縣官)
- Lui Kim Kwong as Adviser (師爺)
- Kwok Ching as Yamen officer (衙差)
- Kam Chi Ching as Yamen officer (衙差)
- Pang Kwok Leung as Yamen officer (衙差)
- Tang Tai Wo as Master (掌門)
- Ho Mei Ho as Master's wife (掌門妻)
- Wong Wai Tak as Mr. Siu (蕭公子)
- Cho Chai as Bank owner (銀庄老闆)
- Samuel Yau as Grocery store owner (雜貨店主)
- Lung Chi Sing as Tailor / Boss (裁縫/老闆)
- Chan Yuk Sing as Fung (風)
- Rocky Lai as Fo (火)
- Yeung Kin Mo as Suet (雪)
- Luk Hei Yeung as Yamen officer (衙差)
- Siu Cheuk Yiu as Yamen officer (衙差)
- Cheung Chun Wah as Yamen officer (衙差)
- Suen Yan Ming as Ho's follower / Taoist priest (荷手下/道/士)
- Ngai Wai Man as Ho's follower (荷手下)
- Cheng Ka Sang as Tai Yuet Chan Yan (太乙真人)
- Lo Cheuk Nam as Tai Yuet disciple / Taoist priest (太乙弟子/道士)
- Leung Chiu Ho as Tai Yuet disciple / Taoist priest (太乙弟子/道士)
- Wong Sing Seung as Ching Tan (正丹)
- Deno Cheung as Ching Tan's disciple / Taoist priest (正丹弟子/道士)]
- Lee Hoi Sang as Taoist priest Yat Chung (一宗道長)
- Sit Sung Kei as Ting Chi (天始)
- Eric Li as Yat Chung's disciple / Taoist priest (一宗弟子/道士)
- Wan Chun Man as Chi's disciple Hoi (始徒海)
- Chiu Chi Ho as Chi's disciple Leung (始徒亮)
- Tang Yu Chiu as Inn owner (客棧掌櫃)
- Chu Lok Fai as Lack's follower (殘手下)
- Lau Wing Po as Taoist priest (道士)
- Kam Chi Ching as Miu Vampire Six Evil A (苗疆六邪甲)
- Pok Kwan as Miu Vampire Six Evil B (苗疆六邪乙)
