= The Corpse Reader =

2011 Spanish novel by Antonio Garrido

- First edition (Spanish)
- Author: Antonio Garrido
- Translator: Thomas Bunstead
- Published: 2011 (Spanish) by Espasa; 2013 (English) by Amazon Publishing
- Publication place: Spain
- Media type: Print (hardcover)
- Pages: 494
- ISBN: 978-1-612-18436-4

The Corpse Reader is a novel in a mix of several genres, has elements of historical thriller, realistic, medical fiction, and science fantasy by Spanish author Antonio Garrido, based on the work of Sòng Cí, considered to be the founder of CSI-style forensic science. It tells the story of a young man of humble origin whose determination led him from his position as a gravedigger in the Fields of Death of Lin'an to a position at the prestigious Ming Academy.

The novel was first published October 5, 2011 in Spain as El Lector de Cadáveres and was then translated by Thomas Bunstead and published May 25, 2013 in United States as The Corpse Reader.

== Plot ==
The book is about a forensic elite who, even at the risk of their own lives, had a mandate that no criminal should go unpunished. Sòng Cí was the first of them, a young man of humble origin who rises to high position.

Most of the novel takes place the Imperial Court.

== Characters ==
- Song Ci: The protagonist of the story, Ci has a strange disorder, scientifically named CIPA (Congenital Insensitivity to Pain with Anhidrosis), which prevents him from perceiving pain.
- Judge Feng: The boss of Ci's father, a high imperial official in Lin'an and one of the best judges of the Chinese empire, respected and admired by all for his incorruptibility, wisdom and good judgment when dictating the sentences of cases who were presented. The protagonist considers him as a second father.
- Third: The sister of Cí Song and only survivor, along with her brother, of the fire that devastated the family home in the village. She is 7 years old and suffers from the same illness that brought her two older sisters (First and Second) to the grave "Third was the only one who had managed to survive, though she remained sickly". Cí is forced to keep her, which will make him get into more than one mess.
- Professor Ming: Director of the academy that bears his name and one of the most reputable doctors in the empire, although he also serves as a judge. Soon he realizes the potential of Cí Song and will immediately reveal himself as his greatest defender.
- Gray: A young nobleman who studies at the Ming academy and who Cí Song has the misfortune of having him as a roommate. Ambitious and lacking in all kinds of scruples, he does not hesitate to appropriate the discoveries of the protagonist when it comes to ascending in the academy and reaching the position for the judiciary that is at stake.

== Development ==
Garrido became interested in Ci Song while attending a conference in New Delhi, as he was curious about the individual seen as the first coroner and the historical beginnings of forensic discipline. As he continued to research he uncovered information about Judge Feng and a Dutch sinologist, which Garrido incorporated into the book. The documentation period was twelve months longer to gather information in the political, cultural, social, judicial, economic, religious, military and sexual fields, together with exhaustive references in the fields of medicine, education, architecture, food, furniture, clothing, measurement systems, currency, state organization and bureaucracy in medieval China of the Song Dynasty. Garrido attended to an autopsy accompanied by Dr. Juan Jose Payo Barrose, forensic doctor and director of the Institute of Legal Medicine of Alicante. All in order to describe with details, he wanted to feel with his own skin the same sensations that Cí Song should have felt because he thought that was the only way to transmit to the audience what Ci had experienced.

== Critical reception ==
The novel has received reviews from outlets such as The Japan Times and Ars Technica, the latter of which stated that it was a "refreshing break from the urban-noir fetish that is so common in conventional thrillers and crime books". AudioFile reviewed the English audio adaptation narrated by Todd Haberkorn, praising his pronunciation and timing.

== Awards ==
- 2012 Zaragoza International Prize for best historical novel published in Spain
- 2014 Griffe Noire Award for the Best Foreign Historical Novel published in France
- 2014 Best Translated Book Award, by Rochester University Press for the best non-English novel
