= Song Ci =

Chinese physician and forensic entomologist (1186–1249)

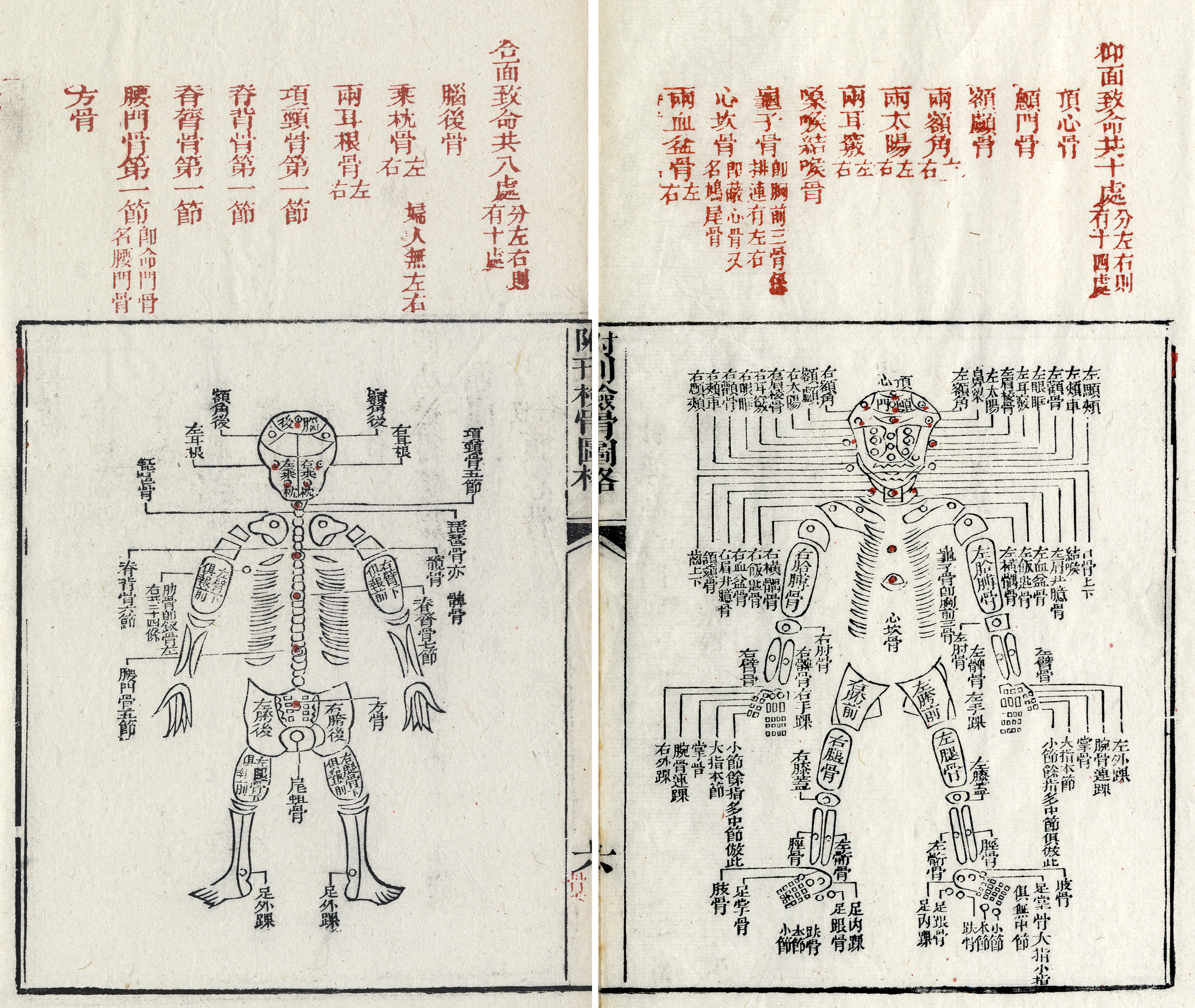
Nomenclature of human bones in Sòng Cí: Xǐ-yuān lù jí-zhèng, edited by Ruǎn Qíxīn (1843).

Song Ci (Chinese: 宋慈; pinyin: Sòng Cí; Wade–Giles: Sung Tzʻu; 1186–1249) was a Chinese physician, judge, forensic medical scientist, anthropologist, and writer of the Southern Song dynasty. He is most well known for being the world's first forensic entomologist, having recorded his experience examining bodies for judicial cases in the Collected Cases of Injustice Rectified (Xi Yuan Ji Lu).

Song Ci was born into a bureaucrat family in Jianyang (in present-day Nanping of Fujian province).

He served as a presiding judge in the high courts of the Song dynasty for several terms. During his post at a criminal court in Hunan Province, Song Ci personally examined the crime scenes each time he encountered a difficult case of homicide or physical assault. Song Ci combined historical cases of forensic science with his own experiences and wrote the book Collected Cases of Injustice Rectified, the oldest known evidence of forensic entomology, with an eye to avoiding miscarriages of justice. The book was esteemed by generations of forensic scientists. Eventually it was translated into English, German, Japanese, French, and other languages. It recounts a murder using a sickle in 1235. A villager was stabbed to death and it was determined that his wounds were inflicted by a sickle. Sickles were used for cutting rice during harvest time, which led them to suspect that a peasant worker was the culprit. The villagers were assembled in the town square where they were made to relinquish their sickles. Despite the clean appearance of one sickle, flies were attracted to traces of blood and swarmed it and not other sickles, revealing the perpetrator, who confessed to his crime.

The book was meant to be a criminal investigations textbook for coroners. In this book Song Ci depicts several cases in which he made notes on how a person died and elaborates on probable causes. He explains in detail how to examine a corpse both before and after burial as well as the process of determining a probable cause of death. The main purpose of this book was to act as a guide for other investigators so they could assess the scene of the crime effectively. The level of detail in explaining his observations in his cases is the first recorded account in history of someone using forensic entomology for judicial matters.

== See also ==
- Witness to a Prosecution (1999) and Witness to Prosecution II (2003) TVB dramas about Song Ci
- The Corpse Reader, a novel in a mix of several genres, by Spanish author Antonio Garrido, based on the book Collected Cases of Injustice Rectified
- Judge of Song Dynasty (2005) and Judge of Song Dynasty (2007), CCTV dramas about Song Ci' s Collected Cases of Injustice Rectified.
