= When Rules Turn Loose =

- Poster
- 識法代言人
- Genre: Modern Drama
- Starring: Liza Wang; Myolie Wu; Sammul Chan; Marco Ngai; Wayne Lai; Ha Yu
- Country of origin: Hong Kong
- Original language: Cantonese
- No. of episodes: 21

Production
- Producer: Lau Kar Ho
- Running time: 45 minutes (approx.)

Original release
- Network: TVB
- Release: December 7, 2005 – January 4, 2006

When Rules Turn Loose (Traditional Chinese: 識法代言人) is a TVB modern drama series broadcast in December 2005.

Though the series backdrop revolves around the court; however, the main theme of the series deals with family bond. It depicts an insight of meaningful values of everyday family life.

== Cast ==
Cast	Role	Description
Ha Yu	Shum Yat-On 沈逸安	Chinese Writer; Suen Man-Yee's husband. Shum Yat-Sum and Shum Yat-Yin's father.
Liza Wang	Suen Man-Yee 孫敏儀	Lawyer; Shum Yat-On's wife. Shum Yat-Sum and Shum Yat-Yin's mother. Yuen Sai-Hei's god-mother.
Patricia Liu	Shum Yat-Sum (Natalie) 沈一心	Lawyer; Suen Man-Yee and Shum Yat-On's daughter. Hung Ji-Dat's ex-wife. Shum Yat-Yin's older sister. Yuen Sai-Hei's lover.
Wayne Lai	Hung Ji-Dat (Raymond) 熊志達	Lawyer; Shum Yat-Shum's ex-husband.
Marco Ngai	Yuen Sai-Hei (Keith) 阮世晞	Lawyer; Suen Man-Yee's god-son. Shum Yat-Sum's lover.
Myolie Wu	Shum Yat-Yin 沈一言	Law Student; Suen Man-Yee and Shum Yat-On's daughter. Shum Yat-Sum's younger sister. Ching Hok-Kan's girlfriend.
Sammul Chan	Ching Hok-Kan (Dick) 程學勤	Lawyer; Shum Yat-Yin's boyfriend.
Lee Shing-Cheung	Shum Ji-Wah (Peter) 沈志華	Shum Yat-On's younger brother.
Nancy Wu	Cheung Lai-Kei 張麗琪	Shum Yat-Yin's friend.
Kate Tsui	Ada	Psychologist; Ching Hok-Kan's friend.
Akina Hong (康華)	Yuen Ka-Wai 袁嘉蕙	Hung Ji-Dat's friend.
Charmaine Li	Betty	

== Viewership ratings ==
	Week	Episode	Average Points	Peaking Points	References
1	December 7–9, 2005	1 — 3	26	—	
2	December 12–16, 2005	4 — 8	27	30	
3	December 19–23, 2005	9 — 13	26	—	
4	December 26–30, 2005	14 — 18	29	—	
5	January 2–4, 2006	19 — 21	33	—	
