= Love Is Beautiful (TV series) =

- 無頭東宮
- Genre: Costume Drama
- Starring: Mariane Chan; Anne Heung; Eddie Cheung; Marco Ngai; Special Appearances: Charmaine Sheh
- Opening theme: True Colours (情的代價) by Stephanie Che
- Country of origin: Hong Kong
- Original language: Cantonese
- No. of episodes: 30

Production
- Running time: 45 minutes (approx.)

Original release
- Network: TVB Jade
- Release: January 28 – March 8, 2002

Love is Beautiful (simplified Chinese: 无头东宫; traditional Chinese: 無頭東宮; lit. 'The Headless East Palace') is a 30-episode TVB costume drama series released overseas in April 2001 and broadcast on TVB Jade Channel in January 2002. It stars Mariane Chan, Anne Heung, Eddie Cheung, Marco Ngai and Charmaine Sheh.

It was Mariane Chan's final work before leaving the entertainment industry.

== Plot ==
Ling Wan is a poor girl that lives in "Beautiful People Village" with her father, Ling Tid, whose wife died after his daughter's birth. Ling Tid owned a metal shop, and Ling Wan is also skilled in carving metal. Also like her father, she was born very ugly, with moles all over her face. When she was thirteen, she had a terrible disease, and when she recovered, the moles had disappeared, but in solidarity with her father until his death, she wore fake moles to look ugly. Ling Wan befriends another ugly girl, Cho Cho, understanding her problems. Both girls are teased and laughed at by the other villagers for their appearance.

The Emperor of China comes to "Beautiful People Village" for a festival. Ling Wan and Cho Cho are never invited to festivals because they are ugly and embarrassing for the town. The emperor disguises himself as a normal rich man. Assassins sent by the emperor's power-hungry uncle, attack the emperor with swords, but Ling Wan saves him. The emperor is injured nonetheless, and Ling Wan takes him to her mother's grave to hide from his attackers, who are later sentenced to death.

The emperor falls in love with Ling Wan not for her beauty, but for her kindness. He decides to marry Ling Wan, and only then does she realise his identity. Cho Cho, who is jealous, uses the services of a street performing sorcerer to become temporarily beautiful, and then becomes desperate for the change to be permanent.

Ling Wan has a wedding and farewell party for the villagers, who now like Ling Wan as she is pretty. Cho Cho, who is leaving the village because of debts, gets Ling Wan to visit her, and they get drunk until Ling Wan falls asleep. Cho Cho brings her to the magician, who switches their faces. As there is no way to switch them back, their lives are changed forever.

== Cast ==
- Mariane Chan - Cho Cho / Ling Wan
- Anne Heung - Ling Wan / Cho Cho
- Evergreen Mak - Fung Lok Yan
- Eddie Cheung - Emperor Zhenzong of Song
- Pierre Ngo - Chiu Hei
- David To Tai Wai - Ling/Chiu Dan
- Chan Wing Han - Fung Song Yi
- Marco Ngai - Siu To
- Benz Hui - Ling Tid
- Kwan Po Wai - Maid of mother of king
- Ha Ping - Emperor's Mother
- Lau Kong - Emperor's Uncle
- Law Lok Lam - Imperial Tutor Cheung Bak-seung
- Wong Ching as General Wong Gao
- Lily Li as a Hotel Madam
- Chan Wing Chun as Eunuch Lam
- Lee Wai Kei as Man Shan
- Bruce Li as a pick pocket ringleader

The show also had cameo appearances from Charmaine Sheh (who played Cho Cho with a temporary face change), Kenneth Ma (as a newly elected local magistrate), and Chui Wing.

== International broadcast ==
Region	Network	Notes
Singapore	TVB Xing He	Dubbed With Mandarin
Singapore	TVB Classic	Dubbed With Mandarin
