= Happy Ever After (Hong Kong TV series) =

1999 Hong Kong television series

- Promo poster
- 金玉滿堂
- Genre: Period drama Romantic comedy
- Written by: Chan Ching-yee; Choi Ting-ting
- Starring: Bobby Au-yeung; Mariane Chan; Kwong Wa; Nnadia Chan; Roger Kwok
- Opening theme: "Sweet, Sour, Bitter, Spice" (甜酸苦辣) by Roman Tam
- Ending theme: "Loving You Is Not Just A Thing" (愛你不是渾閒事) by Nadia Chan
- Country of origin: Hong Kong
- Original language: Cantonese
- No. of episodes: 40

Production
- Executive producer: Chong Wai-kin
- Production location: Hong Kong
- Camera setup: Multi camera
- Running time: 42 – 45 minutes
- Production company: TVB

Original release
- Network: TVB Jade
- Release: 15 March – 7 May 1999

- Traditional Chinese: 金玉滿堂
- Simplified Chinese: 金玉满堂
Transcriptions
Standard Mandarin
- Hanyu Pinyin: Jīn Yù Mǎn Táng
Yue: Cantonese
- Jyutping: Gam1 Jyuk6 Mun5 Tong4

Happy Ever After (Traditional Chinese: 金玉滿堂) is a 1999 Hong Kong grand-production television period drama. A TVB production, the drama was produced by Chong Wai-kin, written by Chan Ching-yee and Choi Ting-ting, and stars an ensemble cast. The drama is set during the reign of the Qianlong Emperor of Late Imperial China's Qing dynasty. The drama tells of a story regarding the struggles of a poor chef and his best friend earning an opportunity to serve the Qianlong Emperor, also befriending the emperor along the way. The drama also places an emphasis on Chinese cuisine with documentations concerning the Manchu Han Imperial Feast.

Happy Ever After acclaimed positive reviews from critics and was TVB's third highest-rating drama of 1999, peaking to 40 points (over 3 million viewers). Happy Ever After was re-broadcast on the same channel in 2007 between January and March.

== Cast ==
- Bobby Au-Yeung as Tai Tung-gun (戴東官), an imperial chef and he plays his dad.
- Mariane Chan as Sun Siu-siu (辛小小), Tung-gun's wife.
- Kwong Wa as Qianlong Emperor (乾隆)
- Adia Chan as Fong Ling (方寧), Consort Tak.
  - also as Ngok Sam-yu (岳心如), the daughter of Noble Ngok. She shares similar facial features as Consort Tak.
- Roger Kwok as Suen Min-leung (孫勉良), Tung-gun's best friend.
- Fiona Leung as Kam Chui-fa (甘翠花), Min-leung's wife.
- Suet Nei as Empress Dowager (太后)
- Wu Fung as Sun Chiu-kwan (辛超群), Siu-siu's father.
- Angie Cheung as Kei Sin-yung (紀倩蓉), Min-leung's first love.
- Wilson Tsui as Chiang Hing-ka (蔣慶嘉), manager of the Imperial kitchen.
- Ha Ping
- Benz Hui
- Roger Kwok as Suen Min-leung
