= Elaine Ng =

Hong Kong actress

- 吳綺莉
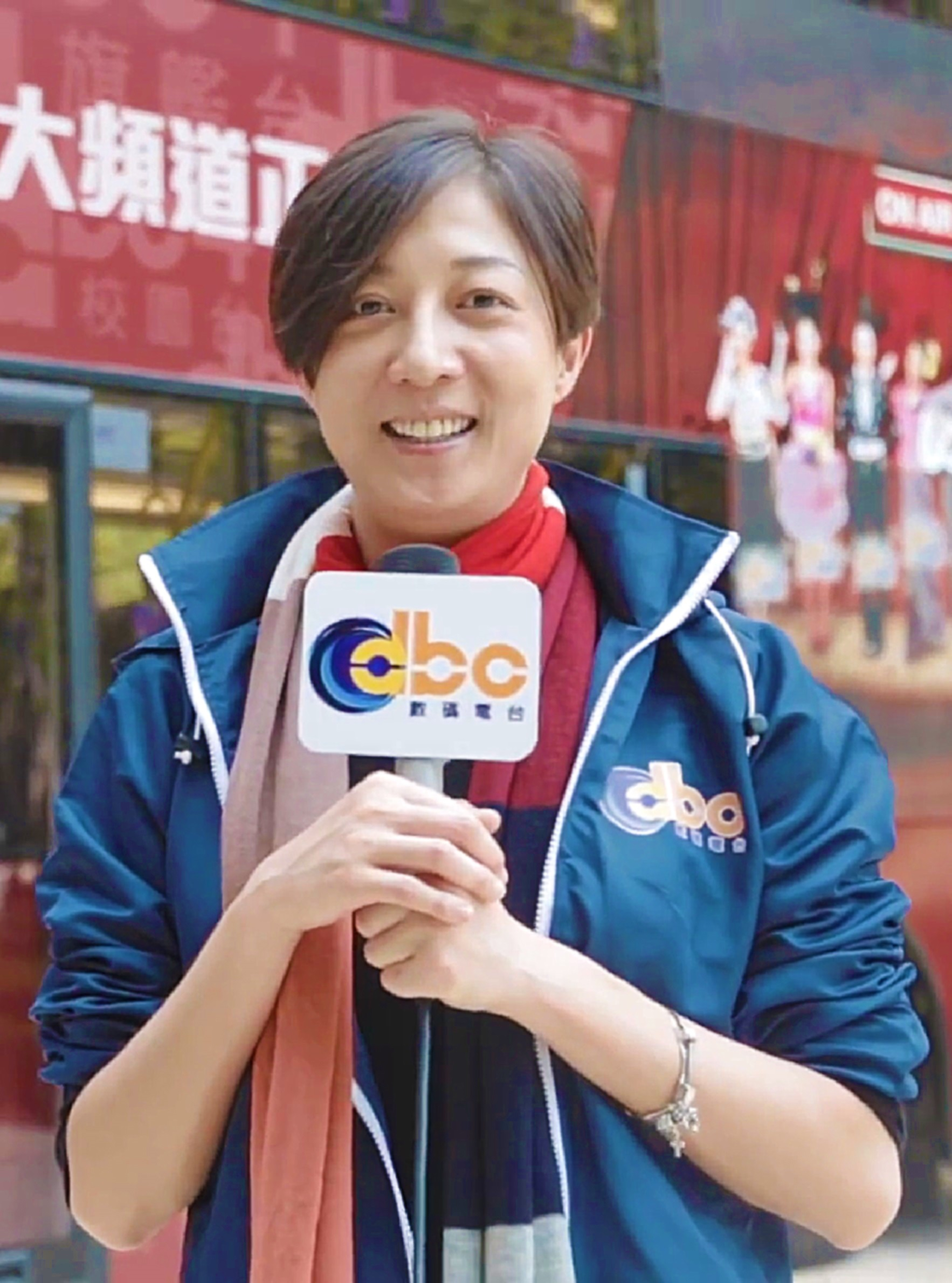
- Born: 23 September 1972 (age 53); British Hong Kong
- Children: 1
- Parent(s): Ng Yat Pang (father); Cheng Lai Ming (mother)
- Awards: Miss Asia 1990

Chinese name
- Traditional Chinese: 吳綺莉
- Simplified Chinese: 吴绮莉
Transcriptions
Standard Mandarin
- Hanyu Pinyin: Wú Qǐlì
Yue: Cantonese
- Jyutping: Ng4 Yi2 Lei6

Elaine Ng Yi-lei (born 23 September 1972), sometimes credited as Elaine Wu, is a Hong Kong actress. She was the winner of Miss Asia in 1990.

She announced that she was pregnant in 1999, and disclosed the affair with Jackie Chan after public speculation. Soon afterwards, Chan admitted he had "only committed a fault that many men in the world commit". She gave birth to a daughter, Etta Ng Chok Lam, on 18 January 1999. Ng raised her daughter without Chan's involvement. Her daughter came out as a lesbian at 17.

== Filmography ==
Year	Title	Role
1991	Central Sandwichman	
1991	Who's the Winner	Nip Hei-tung
1998	Old Time Buddy – To Catch a Thief	Shaw Fong-fong
1999	Ultra Protection	Yau Yeuk Lam
1999	Side Beat	Cheung Ming-wai
2000	War of the Genders	Joyce Lee
2001	Legal Entanglement	Chan Siu-ling
2012	Highs and Lows	Madam Yu (Helen)
