= Witness to a Prosecution =

Hong Kong television series

- DVD cover of first season
- Genre: Historical fiction Detective fiction
- Written by: Chan Ching-yee; Chiu Ching-yung; Ng Siu-tung
- Starring: Bobby Au-yeung; Jessica Hsuan; Mariane Chan; Frankie Lam; Michael Tse; May Kwong; Anderson Junior
- Theme music composer: Peter Kam
- Opening theme: 一個人 performed by Eason Chan
- Country of origin: Hong Kong
- Original language: Cantonese
- No. of series: 2
- No. of episodes: 44 (I–II)

Production
- Producer: Siu Hin-fai
- Production location: Hong Kong
- Camera setup: Multi camera
- Running time: 45 minutes (each)
- Production company: TVB

Original release
- Network: TVB Jade
- Release: 20 December 1999 – 23 March 2003

Related
- Witness to a Prosecution II

Witness to a Prosecution
- Traditional Chinese: 洗冤錄
- Simplified Chinese: 洗冤录
- Literal meaning: Cases of Injustice Rectified
Transcriptions
Standard Mandarin
- Hanyu Pinyin: Xǐ Yuān Lù
Yue: Cantonese
- Jyutping: Sai2 Jyun1 Luk6

Witness to a Prosecution is a Hong Kong television series produced by TVB. The original broadcast was on the TVB Jade network with 45-minute episodes airing five days a week from 20 December 1999 to 16 January 2000. The drama stars Bobby Au-yeung as the famous historical forensic medical expert Song Ci ("Sung Chee" in Cantonese romanisation). Set during the Southern Song Dynasty of Mid-Imperial China, Witness to a Prosecution tells a fictionalised account of Chee's modest beginnings and the events leading to the creation of his book Collected Cases of Injustice Rectified, the world's earliest documentation of forensic science.

Witness to a Prosecution was met with positive reviews and quickly became a popular success. Viewership ratings were consistently high, and the drama was the seventh most-viewed drama in 2000, drawing an average of 33 rating points, peaking at 44 points. The drama also yielded Au-yeung a "Best Actor" win at the 2000 TVB Anniversary Awards. A subsequent sequel was released in 2003, airing on the same channel from 24 February to 23 March 2003. Although viewership ratings peaked higher to 47 points, it was met with mixed reviews.

== Synopsis ==
For 30 years, nighttime keeper Song Ci (Bobby Au-yeung) was despised in To Yuen village due to his posthumous birth in a coffin, having only the sickly scholar Sit Dan (Michael Tse) and the coolie Cha Siu-chaan (Lo Mang) as his friends.

After disputing with the village chief over his family's land, Ci, along with a homeless female thief Tong Sze (Jessica Hsuan), are accused for murdering the chief and are sentenced to death. The village's newly appointed magistrate Sung Yik (Frankie Lam) finds the case suspicious and investigates.

With the help of the mysterious yet experienced coroner Ma Kwai (Lau Kong), Yik successfully revokes Ci and Sze's sentences. Kwai becomes Ci's coroner master and Yik employs Ci to be his personal forensic medical doctor. The two become good friends and partners, successfully solving many murder cases in town.

Sze develops a crush on Yik, unaware that Yik and Nip Fung (Mariane Chan), daughter of chief constable Nip Yan-lung (Gordon Liu), are already in a relationship. Ci, on the other hand, falls for Lam Choi-dip (Eileen Yeow), the spoiled daughter of rich merchant Lam To (Lee Lung-kei). Choi-dip, however, has her eyes on Yik.

Several months later, a man also by the name of Sung Yik shows up and confronts Yik, calling him a traitor. After the two intensely quarrel, the fake Yik accidentally kills the real Sung Yik. In a panic, he buries Sung Yik's body in the garden of the Sung family rice shop. Yik's relatives then mysteriously die one by one; Ci eventually uncovers the body of the real Sung Yik and begins to grow suspicious of the current Yik, a man whom he has always respected and treated as a friend.

== Cast ==
=== Season 1 ===
Note: Some of the characters' names are romanised via Cantonese pronunciation, instead of Mandarin.

- Bobby Au-yeung as Song Ci (宋慈)
- Frankie Lam as Magistrate Sung Yik / Fong Tsun (宋翊 / 方俊)
- Jessica Hsuan as Tong Sze (唐思)
- Mariane Chan as Nip Fung (聶楓)
- Michael Tse as Sit Dan (薛丹)
- Lo Mang as Cha Siu-chaan (查小燦)
- Gordon Liu as Nip Yan-lung (聶人龍)
- Lau Kong as Ma Kwai (馬貴)
- Eileen Yeow as Lam Choi-dip (藍彩蝶)
- May Kwong as Princess Sum-yu (心如郡主)
- Benz Hui as Sung Sing (宋誠)
- Mimi Chu as Lo Fa (魯花)
- Celine Ma as Sung Ling (宋玲)
- Anderson Junior as Tenth Prince (十王爺)
- Alice Fung So-bor as Princess of Hong (康王妃)
- Lee Lung-kei as Lam To (藍濤)
- Lo Chun-shun as Choi Chuen (蔡全)

=== Season 2 ===
Note: Some of the characters' names are romanised via Cantonese pronunciation, instead of Mandarin.

- Bobby Au Yeung as Song Ci
- Charmaine Sheh as Yuen Yuk Chu/ Chu Yuk Yuen
- Stephen Au as Chow Zi Long/ Ah Chung
- Joyce Tang as Yeung Tan Fung/ San Fung
- Angelina Lo as Heung Koo (San Fung's mother)
- Halina Tam as Yuen Yuk Pou
- Jay Lau as Princess Chi Ha
- Liu Kai Chi as Chan Ming/ Royal Doctor
- Ellesmere Choy as Chin Kit
- Law Lok Lam as Chin Pou Tau/Chief Cop/Kit's father
- Raymond Cho as General's Son
- Irene Wong as Pak Yu Mong
- Peter Lai as Yuen Seng Cheung / Yuk Chu and Yuk Pou's father
- Mary Hon as Yuk Pou's mother
- Felix Lok as Ko Tai yan
- Lee Kwok Bun as Ha Hau Kwok Tung/ Princess Chi Ha's husband
