= Angie Cheong =

Malaysian actress

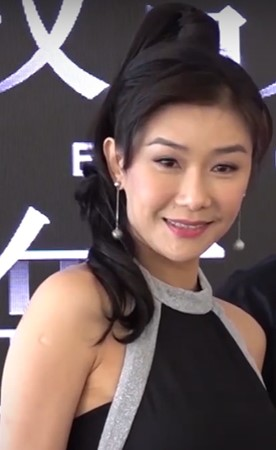
- Cheong attending a press conference for the ViuTV drama series Me Too (假設性無罪) in September 2019
- Born: c.1970 (age 55–56)
- Occupation: Actress
- Years active: 1994–2006, 2009–present

Chinese name
- Traditional Chinese: 張慧儀
- Simplified Chinese: 张慧仪
Transcriptions
Standard Mandarin
- Hanyu Pinyin: Zhāng Huìyí
Yue: Cantonese
- Jyutping: Zoeng1 Wai3 Ji4
Southern Min
- Hokkien POJ: Tiuⁿ Hūi-gî

Angie Cheong Wai-yee (Chinese: 張慧儀) is a Malaysian‑born Hong Kong actress. She won Miss Chinese Malaysia in 1992 and represented Malaysia at the Miss Chinese International pageant in 1993, after which she signed with TVB and began her on‑screen career.

== Life and career ==
=== Early life and pageantry competitions ===
Cheong showed an early interest in performance and beauty pageants, winning the Miss Chinese Malaysia title in 1992 and competing in Miss Chinese International in 1993, which opened the door to her television career in Hong Kong.

=== 1994–2006: TVB career and film sex symbol ===
Cheong made her television debut in 1994 with the TVB series ICAC. She gained recognition for roles such as Lee Choi Yiu/Ng Fong Gwai in A Kindred Spirit (1995–1999), Spider Demon Si Si in Journey to the West (1996), Python Demon in Journey to the West II, Ma Ding‑dong in My Date with a Vampire, and Shek Siu Yuk in Ultra Protection.

Her appearances in Hong Kong films such as Once Upon a Time in Triad Society 2 (1996), A True Mob Story (1998), and Raped by an Angel 3 (1998) established her as a sex symbol.

=== 2003–2008: Abuse, hiatus, and motherhood ===
In 2003, Cheong was seriously injured in an abusive incident involving her then‑fiancé, leaving both physical and emotional scars. She took an extended hiatus from acting, relocating to Beijing to recover and reassess her personal and professional life. During this period, she publicly stated that she would never pursue another romantic relationship.

During her hiatus, Cheong adopted a son named Hanson, born with a congenital heart condition, and raised him as a single mother. She balanced her parental responsibilities with volunteer work and advocacy for children with medical needs.

Although her work with TVB decreased during this time, she never officially declared leaving the network, and no public announcement was made regarding her departure. When she gradually returned to acting, she began collaborating with multiple companies, including TVB and ViuTV, marking the beginning of her freelance career.

=== 2009–present: Return to acting and freelance career ===
Cheong officially resumed acting in 2009 and expanded her work across multiple Hong Kong networks. In 2013, she returned briefly to TVB for the drama Never Dance Alone at the encouragement of producer Eric Tsang.

Since then, she has appeared in television series and films including Deep in the Realm of Conscience (2018), the web series Guardian Angel (2018), I Bet Your Pardon (2019), The Gutter (2020), and A Perfect Gentleman (2023), demonstrating a sustained freelance, multi-network career.

== Filmography ==
=== Film ===
- Once Upon a Time in Triad Society 2 (1996)
- Mystery Files (1996)
- Love Amoeba Style (1997)
- L-O-V-E......Love (1997)
- Love Cruise (1997)
- Love & Sex of the Eastern Hollywood (1998)
- Mr. Wai-Go (1998)
- A True Mob Story (1998)
- Raped by an Angel 3 (1998)
- The Conman (1998)
- Body Weapon (1999)
- Homicidal Maniac (2000)
- An Eye for an Eye (2000)
- A Wicked Ghost II: The Fear (2000)
- Love Me, Love My Money (2001)
- Troublesome Night 12 (2001)
- The Reporter (2003)
- The Prince of Storm (2003)
- The Runner (2004)
- Men in a Blue Mood (2004)
- Love Is a Many Stupid Thing (2004)
- The Key to Destiny (2004)

=== Television ===
- ICAC (1994)
- Class of Distinction (1995)
- Detective Investigation Files (1995)
- A Kindred Spirit (1995–1999)
- Journey to the West (1996)
- Journey to the West II (1998)
- Dark Tales II (1998)
- Ultra Protection (1999)
- Happy Ever After (1999)
- My Date with a Vampire 2 (2001)
- The New Adventures of Chor Lau-heung (2001)
- Showbiz Tycoon (2002)
- Greed Mask (2003, broadcast in Hong Kong in 2006)
- Armed Reaction IV (2004)
- Never Dance Alone (2014)
- Deep in the Realm of Conscience (2018)
- Guardian Angel 2018 Web Drama (2018) – Mak Chi-man/Ms. Mak (episodes 9–13)
- I Bet Your Pardon (2019)
- The Gutter (2020)
- A Perfect Gentleman (2023)
