= Trimming Success =

- Poster
- 飛短留長父子兵
- Genre: Modern Drama
- Starring: Kevin Cheng; Nnadia Chan; Sharon Chan; Wayne Lai; Halina Tam
- Opening theme: "愛平凡" by Kevin Cheng
- Country of origin: Hong Kong
- Original language: Cantonese
- No. of episodes: 20

Production
- Running time: 45 minutes (approx.)

Original release
- Network: TVB
- Release: May 15 – June 9, 2006

Trimming Success (Chinese: 飛短留長父子兵; Jyutping: fei1 dyun2 lau4 coeng4 fu6 zi2 bing1) is a TVB modern drama series released overseas in January 2006 and broadcast on TVB Jade Channel in May 2006.

== Synopsis ==
Jason Fan Tin-Long (Kevin Cheng) is a successful hair-stylist and owns a trendy salon in Lan Kwai Fong. Jason has a model girlfriend Choco Ko Cheuk-Kei (Sharon Chan) who is a big money spender. Jason's family is from Stanley, Hong Kong and his father, Fan Kwong-Wing (Lau Dan) owns an old fashioned barber shop in Stanley Market. Pang Cheng (Nnadia Chan) is Jason's childhood friend who secretly admires Jason. Jason-Choco-Pang Cheng eventually becomes a love-triangle. Jason and his father also need to deal with their love-hate relationship. Jason and Pang Ching soon got married. On the finale, there were three marriages - Jason, Johnny and Jason's brother, Kenny. Choco attends the wedding, initially looking solemn as she tells Pang Cheng that it was her fault who made her lose her boyfriend. She appears to be drawing out something from her pocket to ruin the wedding (a gun, possibly) but it is revealed that she drew out a whistle. She whistles loudly to the crowd, and her friends rush over, setting free balloons. The wedding begins, and Choco tells Pang Cheng that she has got over the matter.

== Cast ==
Cast	Role	Description
Kevin Cheng	Fan Tin-Long (Jason) 范天朗	Hair-Stylist; Pang Ching's childhood friend/lover. Ko Cheuk-Kei's ex-boyfriend.
Adia Chan	Pang Cheng 彭澄	Fan Tin-Long's childhood friend/lover.
Sharon Chan	Ko Cheuk-Kei (Choco) 高卓琪	Fan Tin-Long's ex-girlfriend.
Wayne Lai	Ho Jo-Sing (Johnny) 何祖昇	Lam Wai-Ji's lover.
Halina Tam	Lam Wai-Ji (Wing) 林慧姿	Ho Jo-Sing's lover.
Lau Dan	Fan Kwong-Wing (George) 范光榮	Barber; To Suk-Ying's husband. Fan Tin-Long and Fan Tin-Ming's father.
Ching Hor Wai (程可為)	To Suk-Ying 姚淑英	Fan Kwong-Wing's wife. Fan Tin-Long and Fan Tin-Ming's mother.
Stephen Wong	Fan Tin-Ming (Kenny) 范天明	Fan Tin-Long's younger brother. Pang Kit's husband(in last episode)
Anita Kwan (關伊彤)	Pang Kit 彭潔	Pang Ching's younger sister. Fan Tin Ming's wife(in last episode)
Law Lok Lam	Pang Gan 彭根	Pang Ching and Pang Kit's father.

== Viewership ratings ==
	Week	Episode	Average Points	Peaking Points	References
1	May 15–19, 2006	1 — 5	30	—	
2	May 22–26, 2006	6 — 10	32	34	
3	May 29 - June 2, 2006	11 — 15	31	34	
4	July 3–7, 2006	16 — 20	32	36	
