= Joe Ma =

Joe Ma may refer to:

- Joe Ma (actor) (born 1968), Hong Kong actor and former policeman
- Joe Ma (filmmaker) (born 1964), Hong Kong film director, scriptwriter and producer

== See also ==
- Joseph Ma (disambiguation)
