= Ultra Protection =

Hong Kong television series

- Official poster
- 非常保鑣
- Genre: Crime drama Action
- Written by: Alex Pau; Au Kin-yee; Cat Kwan; Chan Ho-pan; Pang Wai; Wong Hiu-chong
- Directed by: Chung Shu-kai; Jazz Boon; Ng Ka-kan; Lee Suk-man
- Starring: Bowie Lam; Mariane Chan; Cheung Siu-fai; Steven Ma; Angie Cheong; Elaine Ng; Kenneth Tsang
- Theme music composer: Alex San
- Opening theme: Good Morning Good Night (早安晚安) by Steven Ma
- Ending theme: Please Stay Behind (請你留步) by Steven Ma
- Composer: Tsui Yat-kan
- Country of origin: Hong Kong
- Original language: Cantonese
- No. of episodes: 20

Production
- Producer: Mui Siu-ching
- Production location: Hong Kong
- Camera setup: Multi camera
- Production company: TVB

Original release
- Network: TVB Jade
- Release: 2 August – 27 August 1999

Ultra Protection
- Traditional Chinese: 非常保鑣
- Simplified Chinese: 非常保镳
- Literal meaning: "Extraordinary Bodyguard"
Transcriptions
Standard Mandarin
- Hanyu Pinyin: Fēi Cháng Bǎo Biāo
Yue: Cantonese
- Jyutping: Fei1 Seong4 Bou2 Biu1

Ultra Protection is a 1999 Hong Kong action crime drama television series produced by TVB and starring Bowie Lam, Mariane Chan, Cheung Siu-fai and Angie Cheung.

== Plot ==
Po (Bowie Lam) was an OCTB sergeant before being expelled from the police force which led him to join his friend Kit's (Cheung Siu-fai) security company and was hired by rich man Nam (Kenneth Tsang) to be bodyguard of his only son Cho (Steven Ma). Po and Cho have different personalities and do not get along well however as times passes by, they develop a friendship. At the time Cho also falls in love with his father's friend's daughter Lam (Elaine Ng), but Lam develops feelings for Po instead. Kit's younger sister Fong (Mariane Chan), who had crush for Po for many years, learns of this and does everything possible to match Cho and Lam together.

Meanwhile, Po has been investigating about his wife's Wai (Wallis Pang) real murderer and by means pursue Yuk (Angie Cheong), who is linked with the triads. Unexpectedly, they unknowingling fell in love with each other. Later Cho's sister and Nam were suddenly kidnapped and Po also learns that the kidnapper is related to Wai's death and in work or private, he vows to battle with the kidnapper to the end. At the most critical time, Po finds out that he was betrayed all along.

== Cast ==
=== Main cast ===
| Cast | Role | Description |
|---|---|---|
| Bowie Lam | Lui Tin-po 雷天寶 | - |
| Mariane Chan | Fu Wai-fong 傅惠芳 | - |
| Cheung Siu-fai | Fu Ching-kit 傅正杰 | - |
| Steven Ma | Kei Yin-cho 紀彥組 | - |
| Angie Cheong | Shek Siu-yuk 石小玉 | - |
| Elaine Ng | Yau Yeuk-lam 邱若琳 | - |
| Kenneth Tsang | Kei Chung-nam 紀中南 | - |

=== Other cast ===
| Cast | Role | Description |
|---|---|---|
| Liu Kai-chi | Lau Ying-yung 劉英勇 | - |
| Florence Kwok | Kei Yuet-ning 紀悅寧 | - |
| Law Lok-lam (羅樂林) | Fu Pak-kin 傅百堅 | - |
| Benz Hui | Lui Chi-tat 雷志達 | - |
| Henry Lee | Seung Wing-on 常永安 | - |
| Kenny Wong | Law Lik 羅力 | - |
| Wallis Pang | Chan Ka Wai 陳家慧 | - |
| Andy Tai (戴志偉) | Lee Wing-kuen 李永權 | - |
| Mannor Chan (陳曼娜) | Law Pik-wan 羅碧雲 | - |
| Yeung Ying-wai (楊英偉) | Lee Man-shun 李文信 | - |
| Candy Chiu (趙靜儀) | Chin Mei-yan 錢美茵 | - |
