= Mariane Chan =

Hong Kong actress

Mariane Chan Miu Ying
- Born: 1 August 1972 (age 54); British Hong Kong
- Occupations: Actress; singer
- Years active: 1994–2002; 2007–present

Chinese name
- Traditional Chinese: 陳妙瑛
- Simplified Chinese: 陈妙瑛
Transcriptions
Standard Mandarin
- Hanyu Pinyin: Chén Miàoyīng

Mariane Chan Miu Ying (Chinese: 陳妙瑛) (born 1 August 1972) is a Hong Kong former actress. She competed in the 1993 Miss Hong Kong Pageant and finished in the top five.

== Filmography ==
=== Film ===
- Ebola Syndrome (1996)

=== Television series ===
- Love is Beautiful (TVB, 2002)
- Lost in Love (大囍之家) (TVB, 2000)
- Witness to a Prosecution (TVB, 1999)
- Life for Life (命轉情真) (TVB, 1999)
- Road to Eternity (TVB, 1999)
- Ultra Protection (TVB, 1999)
- Happy Ever After (TVB, 1999)
- Journey to the West II (TVB, 1998)
- A Place of One's Own (大澳的天空) (TVB, 1998)
- A Tough Side of a Lady (TVB, 1998)
- The Disappearance (TVB, 1997)
- Drunken Angels (男人四十打功夫) (TVB, 1997)
- Journey to the West (TVB, 1996)
- The Criminal Investigator II (TVB, 1996)
- Nothing to Declare (緝私群英) (TVB, 1996)
- Money Just Can't Buy (天降財神) (TVB, 1996)
- Ancient Heroes (隋唐群英會) (TVB, 1996)
- When a Man Loves a Woman (新同居關係) (TVB, 1994)
- Knot to Treasure (婚姻物語) (TVB, 1994)
- Glittering Moments (TVB, 1994)
