= Justice Sung II =

Hong Kong television series

- Promo poster
- 狀王宋世傑
- Genre: Period drama, Historical fiction, Comedy, Law, Mystery
- Created by: Hong Kong Television Broadcasts Limited
- Starring: Cheung Tat-ming; Amy Kwok; Dayo Wong; Waise Lee
- Opening theme: Ching Fung Bat Yim (清風不染) performed by Adam Cheng
- Composer: Joseph Koo
- Country of origin: Hong Kong
- Original language: Cantonese
- No. of episodes: 32

Production
- Producer: Steven Tsui
- Production location: Hong Kong
- Camera setup: Multi-camera
- Running time: 45 minutes per episode

Original release
- Network: TVB
- Release: 7 June – 17 July 1999

Related
- Justice Sung (1997)

Justice Sung II (狀王宋世傑(貳)) is a Hong Kong television series. It was first run on TVB in 1999.

== Plot ==
=== Episodes 1–3 ===
The story picks up from what was left off in the first installment. Sung Sai Kit (宋世傑) along with his wife, Lin Lung (白玲瓏), and his family, which now includes his son, are trying to elude the Qing officials because he had offended the King's mother and she wants him dead. Seven years later, the Sung family is residing in a northern cold region called San Tong. Sung Sai Kit opens a medicine shop with the help of his wife, who knows medicine and martial arts well.

Along the way, Sun Sai Kit meets Lai Sam, who is a peasant with a greedy and evil personality. They can be considered mutual friends at first, but becomes enemies later. Sai Kit also meets Siu Chui, an orphan whose father just died. She seeks the help of anyone who can help her bury her father, in return, she will do anything this person wants. Sai Kit sees this and tries to buy her, but another rich guy has the upper hand and wins her instead. Little did she know that this rich guy is a pervert and intends to rape her at an abandoned house. Fortunately, Sai Kit saves her in time and she decides to be his peasant for the rest of her life. Sai Kit admires her beauty and intends to make her his second wife. His wife, without knowing, interferes and Sai Kit had to make an excuse that Siu Chui belongs to Lai Sam, who immediately agrees because he also admires her beauty. He, like the rich guy, intends to rape her also, but Lin Lung's disciple, Cho Kau, saves her.

Lin Lung sees that Siu Chui is the only person who can get their son to speak. Their son has an unusual sickness that makes not speak, write or read. This was the result of Sai Kit, who had accidentally cause this. Lin Lung decides to let Siu Chui and their seven-year-old son marry. Sai Kit misunderstood that Lin Lung is making plans to allow him to marry Siu Chui. On the wedding day, Sai Kit is shocked to see that Siu Chui will be his daughter-in-law. He is depressed and during the night of the celebration, a headless person riding on a white horse crashes the celebration. Thus, leading to a mysterious case.

This case piques Sai Kit's interest because that's his lifelong profession. His wife, however, forbids him to meddle in these kinds business because they are criminals on the run and if Sai Kit makes a public appearance in front of the Qing generals and officials, their family will likely die.

It turns out that the headless corpse is that of a great general named Tit Tau. He is the great general who helped the Qing dynasty win many battles and is the best friend of the King's brother, Kung Chan Yeung. It is through Kung Chan Yeung that the identification of headless body is known. Tit Tau has three scars on his body due to his many battles and Kung Chan Yeung knows about these.

Sai Kit becomes even more interested and wants to do anything to solve the case, even enlisting the help of Lai Sam in which he will be the lawyer.

=== Episodes 4–6 ===
Lai Sam is now a lawyer on the case, but he does not know anything. It is Sung Sai Kit, hereafter called Justice Sung, that is directing him. Many lawyers develop their theory on how Tit Tau died, but the best only came from Lai Sam with the help of Justice Sung. He alleges that only someone who can get near Tit Tau and his horse can chop off his head.

At this time Lai Sam tries every attempt to rape Siu Chui and luckily Cho Kau saves her, but Lai Sam, angered and vindictive, plans to accuse and blame Cho Kau of the murder of Tit Tau. Justice Sung finds out and refuses to help Lai Sam, but soon is forced to comply because Lai Sam threatens. It turns out that Lai Sam has discovered that Justice Sung is the well-known justice that the Qing officials have been trying to seek. Lai Sam orders Justice Sung to help him or he will reveal Justice Sung's identity. Justice Sung can not do anything but agree to because he must protect his family's safety. Thus, Cho Kau is arrested after Lai Sam explained his theory on Cho Kau killed Tit Tau. First, Lai Sam asked Cho Kau to come near Tit Tau's white horse. The horse does not react and allows Cho Kau to touch him. Lai Sam then explains that the white horse is very rebellious and only let those that he trusts, touch him. Cho Kau was able to touch the white horse, therefore he should be able to get near Tit Tau. The next test is asking Cho Kau to chop a piece of log. Cho Kau then chops it with fierce force. Lai Sam explains only a person with great power and force will be able to chop off Tit Tau's head. The final test was Cho Kau's origin. He was born in some region that its native people were killed by Tit Tau. This would explain Cho Kau's motive because he wants revenge. These three evidence proved him to be the killer and Kung Chan Yeung holds him captive waiting for sentence in a few days.

Meanwhile, Lai Sam asks Justice Sung to set him up with Siu Chui. Justice Sung reluctantly agrees and lied to Siu Chui to make her drink this medicine which is a sleeping pill. However, his wife, Ling Lung accidentally drinks it and she falls asleep in Siu Chui's bedroom. Loi Sam comes and thinks that she' s Siu Chui. Justice Sung does not know about this until Siu Chui shows up at his room and she told him Ling Lung had taken the medicine. Justice Sung runs to Siu Chui's room and stops Lai Sam, telling him that the person lying on the bed is wife. However, Lai Sam doesn't stop and wants to continue. Justice Sung has taken enough and hits Lai Sam, thus causing Lai Sam to leave in defeat.

Justice Sung now knows that his identity will be made public and he asks his family to leave during the night. The next morning, he comes to the court and declares his identity. At first, some didn't believe him until he described his case in a very detailed manner. Everybody now agrees that he' s Justice Sung. However, he must help Cho Kau to get rid of his guilty sentence and ask Kung Chan Yeung to let him have a few days to find evidence. Kung Chan Yeung agrees.

When Justice Sung return home, he felt lonely because his family had left the night before, however they didn't leave and he was very happy to see them. He promised them that he would prove Cho Kau's innocence.

Justice Sung then had a reason to prove that the headless corpse not Tit Tau through a goose/duck analogy that he had encountered the day before the trial is to begin. In court, he asked the audience to identify an animal and they said it's a goose because he said he had bought it at a goose shop that has been open for twenty years. It turns out that this animal is duck. The reason that people cannot tell the difference is because this animal has been chopped off its head. Justice Sung claims that since the headless corpse does not have a head, it's hard to tell if it is Tit Tau or not. Justice Sung then says that these three scars can be made up.

=== Episodes 7–9 ===
Justice explains that the body was scarred at most 3 years ago, but it is a known fact that Tit Tau's scars were of many years of battles and wars. Also, the corpse's feet had a lot of calluses. Justice Sung then claims that Tit Tau's feet could not have been that callused because he's a great general and he usually rides in his horse and would never walk. Thus, proving the corpse is not that of Tit Tau's. The final verdict will be pronounced the next day.

While everyone is complementing Justice Sung's great argument, they begin to look down upon Lai Sam and treat him poorly because he appeared useless in front of Justice Sung in the court. However, the next day, Lai Sam appeared confident and argued his case. He said that the corpse is definitely Tit Tau's and he has proof. Lai Sam said that 3 years ago, Tit Tau had taken a special medicine to peel his skin and create a new one, which explains why the skin around the scars on the corpse looks so new and young. Also, Lai Sam also said that the calluses on the corpse's feet were the result of Tit Tau's heavy uniform and when he did walk, the equipment and clothing were so heavy, it created pressure on his feet. Everybody is confused now and some thinks the corpse is Tit Tau and some think it' s not. The case is delayed for another day.

Justice Sung tries to understand how can Lai Sam know a lot of Tit Tau's information. He then follows Lai Sam to the woods and saw a man who's sharpening his sword. This mysterious man had told Lai Sam of Tit Tau's personal life. It turns out this man is Tit Tau and he is hiding, trying to live a normal life with his young wife. Justice Sung also finds out that the body is that of a soldier who left his home 3 years ago to war. Tit Tau is forced to reveal himself and admits that he killed the person. Tit Tau uses his popularity, his accomplishments, and his friendship with Kung Chan Yueng to rid him of the murder charge. He said that he's tired of the fighting and war life and he wants to settle down.

However, Justice Sung wants to seek justice for the innocent person who was killed and he wants Tit Tau charged. Tit Tau then makes up a story that this person owes him his life because Tit Tau had saved him before. Justice Sung counters and brought in an old man who had saved Tit Tau's life when he was young and claims that this man has the right to kill Tit Tau also. Lai Sam then figures out a way to help Tit Tau. He explained that Tit Tau had to kill this person because he violated the army camp's rule and tried to escape.

The next day, Justice Sung meets Tit Tau's young wife, who is a tribal girl. Justice Sung now understands Tit Tau's reason for hiding. He then goes to court and said that Tit Tau also violated the army camp rules because he had left the camp's vicinity to visit his young wife just like the innocent person and thus he should be killed also. Tit Tau has nothing to say, but accepts his punishment of decapitation. He asked for a day to be with his wife and he will decapitate himself and bring the head the next day.

At night, he went to see his wife for the last time and when he was about to kill himself, Lai Sam came in and stopped him. The next morning, Lai Sam came with a head, but this head is that of Tit Tau' s wife. It turns out that Tit Tau had chopped his wife's head the night before when Lai Sam said that since his wife belongs to a tribe that Tit Tau was ordered to kill. This tribe was completely wiped off by Tit Tau. He found a baby crying and he took her home and fell in love with this baby 16 years later. Tit Tau explains that since she belongs to the tribe, he was only trying to find the rebels and kill them when he left the army camp. He is free to go. Kung Chan Yeung and Justice are shocked and horrified. Kung Chan Yeung can't believe that his friend Tit Tau would kill his own wife.

Tit Tau makes Lai Sam one of his assistants. However, Justice Sung found out that Tit Tau' s wife was pregnant and gets angry. He confronts Tit Tau and told him that he no t only killed his wife, but also his unborn baby. Tit Tau goes crazy and couldn't believe it. He then takes Lai Sam with him to the court and told Lai Sam to tell everybody of his evil doings. He confessed that he did kill the innocent person and did all sorts of evil deeds during his battles (like killing women and young children) and worst, he killed his wife and his own baby. He kills himself by chopping his head off in the court.

=== Episode 10–15 ===
Justice Sung is granted 3 years of freedom with the help of Kung Chan Yeung. So he and his family decides to move back to their original hometown. It was during this time that he met a famous monk, whom I will call "Si Fu." This monk is a well-respected one and is admired by the royal court. When Ling Lung hears about him, she asks Justice Sung to take her to him to help their son get better. Justice Sung does not agree but eventually takes them anyway. It turns out that Justice Sung's father knows Si Fu very well before he decided to become a monk.

While visiting Si Fu, Siu Chui suddenly sings a tune and Si Fu somehow is struck by it and asks Siu Chui to come with him to the room. Moments later, Si Fu is found dead on his bed with Siu Chui holding the bloody knife. She is taken into custody.

Justice Sung does not believe that Siu Chui would commit such a horrible act and visits her in prison. He then suddenly see Siu Chui's voice change into 4 different people – a man, a lady, a kid, and an old man. He tries to ask them if they were the one who killed Si Fu, but then Siu Chui wakes up and said that she does not know what happens. Justice Sung is confused as walks home. Suddenly, he encounters a fortuneteller. The lady said his forehead is dark and is sure that he's been visited by spirits and told him to be careful. Justice Sung is now scared.

The next day, he visits the fortuneteller who claims she can bring back the spirits and she did. Four different voices claimed that Si Fu killed them and each of them swore they would kill him. One of them admitted the murder.

Justice Sung then goes to court the next day trying to explain that spirits visited Siu Chui and that the spirits were the one who killed Si Fu. Many believe him because Siu Chui spoke in 4 different voices and it was quite impossible to do that. Also, one of the spirits claimed that he was murdered by Si Fu after Si Fu robbed him of his gold statue. Si Fu then buried him in a forest and left behind his pair of shoes with the corpse. Justice Sung then tries to find the forest and a skeleton was found with a pair of shoes. The next spirit claims that he was killed by Si Fu because he knew of Si Fu's scam to swindle money from civilians. The third victim was a lady who was raped by Si Fu and she hung herself because she was ashamed. The fourth victim was a child and he was killed by Si Fu and was thrown into a well. The kid's body was found in a well. All of this evidence confirms that Siu Chui was visited by spirits and did not kill Si Fu, but it was the spirits.

Siu Chui is acquitted. Every body now hates Si Fu and condemns him although he is dead already. His reputation as a well-respected monk is tarnished and Justice Sung's dad feels that Si Fu would never commit such lecherous acts. He then recognizes the fortuneteller to be somebody he knew but cannot remember who. Justice Sung and his dad have an argument because Justice Sung believes that Si Fu is an immoral person and his dad defends Si Fu saying that before Si Fu became a monk, he was very rich and can have as many beautiful women he wants. Thus does not make him the thief, rapist, and killer that everybody thinks he is. Siu Chui overhears this and leaves the house at night feeling that it is all her fault that father and son argued. She went to see the fortuneteller and the next morning, turns herself in and admits that she is the murderer.

Justice Sung is shocked and asks her why she did that. She would not explain and he said he believed in her innocence. Siu Chui will be sentenced to death.

Justice Sung's father visits the fortuneteller and now remembers her.

Flashback

It turns out that the fortuneteller was Si Fu's lover 30 years ago and she was a famous opera singer. However, she was greedy and evil, so Si Fu breaks up with her and leaves her. Si Fu then falls in love with her maid, who also sings very well too. On the day they were to be married, the fortuneteller came to the ceremony and killed the maid and is about to kill Si Fu, but he took a lamp and burned her face. She then escapes and is forced to jump off the cliff. She survives, but everybody in town does not recognize her because her face is deformed. People threw rocks at her and are repulsed by her. She swore to seek revenge on Si Fu, who was so saddened by his bride's death that he decides to become a monk.

The fortuneteller then tell Justice Sung's father, who is now tied to a chair, that she adopted Siu Chui when she was very small and young. She overheard Siu Chui sing and her voice was very good. The fortuneteller then buys Siu Chui from her father and teaches her how to sing with different voices (thus, explaining how Siu Chui had four different voices). At first, Siu Chui refused to listen to the fortuneteller and kill Si Fu, but the fortuneteller told Siu Chui that she was the one who saved her and she should repay the deeds. Siu Chui reluctantly agrees.

When Siu Chui was invited into Si Fu's room, he questioned her how she knew how to sing the song. It reminded him of his bride who also sang the song and Siu Chui's voice sounded just like her. Then, Siu Chui takes out a knife and is about to stab him, but could not. The fortuneteller is hiding in his room and comes out and stab him multiple times. She then put the knife in Siu Chui's hand, who is now frightened, and she is the assumed murderer.

End of flashback

The fortuneteller set the house on fire hoping to burn Justice Sung's father. However he is saved. While the fortuneteller is rejoicing her success in her revenge, she sees two people, a man and a woman, who looks like Si Fu and her maid. She follows them into an abandoned house. The two people hide behind a curtain and starts talking in the voice of Si Fu and the maid. They talked of how happy they are now that they are joined in death and how the fortuneteller will be unhappy for the rest of her life. Justice Sung is hiding in the house too. He had hired two opera singers to make the fortuneteller admit that she had committed the murder. The fortuneteller hears the two singers and gets mad, however, she discovers the plan and the plan fails.

Siu Chui will be sentenced at night and Justice Sung is scrambling to help. Ling Lung sees this and rescues Siu Chui. The fortuneteller is at her house and looks into the mirror and sees a reflection of her young beautiful self. The reflection then talks to her and tells her that she did not do the right thing. The fortuneteller finally admits to killing Si Fu. Siu Chui appears behind the mirror. She has been impersonating the voice and appearance of the fortuneteller. The fortuneteller is arrested and Siu Chui is set free.......

=== Episodes 15–21 ===
After Siu Chui is set free, she decides to leave the Sung family secretly because she feels she has cause great trouble for the family. Luckily, Cho Kau finds her, however a snake while finding her bites him. While unconscious, he unknowingly declares his love for Siu Chui and Ling Lung decides to let Siu Chui break her ties with the Sung family and legally marry Cho Kau. So, Siu Chui and Cho Kau decide to leave the family and start their life together in another city. Justice Sung is disappointed because he has feelings for Siu Chui.

Siu Chui and Cho Kau move to a city called Ching Yeen. While choosing unsolved cases, Justice Sung purposely picks one in Ching Yeen so that he can be near Siu Chui. The case is of a dog being accidentally killed. While Justice Sung takes on this case, a mysterious person is hiding behind and recording every details of the case. Justice Sung won the case easily.

It turns out that Cho Kau and Siu Chui though legally married haven't sleep together. Justice Sung comes and visits them and told his servant that Cho Kau is like the guy who sells bread in the story "Fan Kim Lin." Cho Kau is the ugly husband and Siu Chui is the beautiful wife who eventually will ditch her husband and marry a rich guy. Cho Kau overhears this and is greatly disappointed that he cannot support Siu Chui and make her happy. He decides to be a coolie at a medicine shop to make more money.

The mysterious person who has been recording Justice Sung's every move is Lai Sam. Unbelievably, he is now more keen, intelligent and sly. He tells a lawyer to argue with Justice Sung on another case and Lai Sam is the person directing the lawyer. In court, the puppet lawyer gives Justice Sung the fits and he is confused as to why this lawyer has the crafts to defend and argue with him. Lai Sam then piques Justice Sung's interest by revealing some foods that describes Justice Sung, who tries to find who this mysterious person is. Justice Sung wins the case, but is still confused.

Cho Kau joins a rebel group who is trying to resist the Qing's forces after Siu Chui finds out that Cho Kau injured himself while working as a coolie for a medicine shop. She decides to sell bread and stumbled upon the city's general, who is a pervert. He wants to rape Siu Chui, but Cho Kau stops him and is badly injured by the general's men.

Justice Sung goes back to his home and asks Ling Lung for some medicine to cure Cho Kau's injuries. However, she forgot to remind him that the medicine must be drunk with wine only. Ling Lung chases after Justice Sung to Ching Yeen. Justice Sung then gives Cho Kau the medicine and he drank it with tea and starts to spit blood. They thought it was okay, so Justice Sung and Siu Chui decides to buy some food in the market. While at the market, Justice Sung declares his love Siu Chui, she didn't say anything and was a bit shocked. However, at this time, Ling Lung overhears their conversation and is extremely mad. She decides not to say anything until Justice Sung comes home.

When Justice Sung arrives back, Ling Lung confronts him about the situation but he denies it. She momentarily forgives him.

Cho Kau and his rebel friends decide to teach the general a lesson for trying to rape his wife, Siu Chui. They beat him up and he doesn't know who is doing this. Then, another general (I'll call him general 2) with great kung fu comes and saves the general. General 2 has been trying to find the rebels for a long time. They took the general hostage in a brothel house and Cho Kau is now stuck in this situation. General 2 decides to take Siu Chui as hostage also. Siu Chui begs Cho Kau to give up, but his rebel friends told him that if they give up now, they would mostly die because General 2 will kill them after they release the general. General 2 asks Justice Sung to come and discuss a possible agreement between the rebel and the General 2. Justice Sung finally convinces them to give up and as they walk out of the brothel, the soldiers shoot them to death, their body hung in front of people as an example. Justice Sung felt betrayed by the General 2 and wants to put the General, General 2 in prison for their broken agreement. Lai Sam appears to defend them and Justice Sung is shocked.

Justice Sung purposely wrote some phrases that when they are read backwards, it becomes phrases that solicit rebellious comments. He is then put into jail. However, Justice Sung doesn't seem to be worried and is happy. Lai Sam then figures out Justice Sung's plans. It turns out that Justice Sung did this because he wants Kung Chan Yeung to take the case and knowing that he is good friends with Kung Chan Yeung, the two Generals will likely be convicted. Lai Sam warns them about this and on the day Kung Chan Yeung arrives, Justice Sung explained the phrases to Kung Chan Yeung that these phrases commends and praises the Qing dynasty. Justice Sung is set free to argue the case.

Lai Sam and the two generals have their agenda prepared saying that they were unknowingly coerced into killing the rebels. Lai Sam went as far as claiming that the Justice Sung is the perpetrator behind the killings. Lai Sam stated Justice Sung's motive saying Justice Sung was in love with Siu Chui and wanted Cho Kau dead and this was a perfect opportunity. Justice Sung is convicted and will be sentenced to death. Ling Lung doesn't believe him and leaves him. Siu Chui stabs him in the stomach.

On the day of the Kung Chan Yeung's leaving, Ling Lung takes him hostage demanding the two generals to release her husband. They comply and Justice is taken to the brothel where his wife is holding Kung Chan Yeung hostage. Lai Sam and the two generals try to find the Sung family. Luckily they left in time. Siu Chui told Lai Sam that she hates Justice Sung very much for killing her husband, so she said she thought of a plan. When they went to the brothel, they told Justice Sung and Ling Lung that they have their son, which is not true. Ling Lung and Justice Sung believed them and decides to make an agreement like last time with the rebels. Lai Sam was allowed to come inside the brothel and make the agreement with Kung Chan Yeung as the valid witness should anything happen to them. Little did they know that they were tricked. Lai Sam had designed to have weapons in Justice Sung's clothing. Luckily, Ling Lung traded Kung Chan Yeung's clothing with Justice Sung. As they walk out of the brothel, the two generals ask the fake Justice Sung to raise his two hands up and weapons starts flying out. The general orders his soldiers to shoot at Justice Sung because he has weapons and that broke the agreement. However, it was Kung Chan Yeung that they shot at.

Marco Ngai is the new general taking on this case. Justice explains in court that it was Lai Sam who orchestrated to kill Kung Chan Yeung just like how Lai Sam explained Justice Sung killed the rebels. Kung Chan Yeung appears and he is uninjured because he had worn a protecting vest. He set up the two generals and Lai Sam. Even Siu Chui set up Lai Sam claiming he was the one who thought of the plan to use a fake boy to be Justice Sung's son. The two generals were sentenced and General 2 shot at Lai Sam.

Siu Chiu decides to become a nun after so much tragedy. Ling Lung hasn't forgiven Ling Lung and leaves Ching Yeen without Justice Sung.

=== Chapters 21–26 ===
After Ling Lung leaves Ching Yeen, Justice Sung returns home later with Marco, who is also overseeing the business matters in Justice Sung's city. Ling Lung still refuses to forgive Justice Sung and kicks him out of the house. He decides to take residence at Marco's place.

Justice Sung tries to impress his wife by defending a lady whose husband has committed numerous acts of infidelity with prostitutes. However, he fails and tries again by trying to incite men to beat him up over a gambling game. He too fails this time for Ling Lung is stubborn.

Marco is an honest and respected general. He gives free rice and sponsors charities. One day he met a lady at the charity and feels a sense of closeness with her. He tries to find her with Justice Sung at a poor shelter. He learns that she works as a sanitary lady (one who gathers the feces in human toilets). When he finally found her at her house, he found her husband dead with a kitchen knife on her hand. She is taken into custody.

Marco senses that she is innocent and tries to ask her if she has a reason, but since she cannot talk (she is mute) and refused to cooperate, he is forced to put her on trial. Just then, her daughter played by Margaret Chung rushes in and explains her mother's innocence. Margaret said that her father is an abuser and always hits her mother. He always gamble and takes the money her mother earned to gamble, he even tried to sell Margaret to a brothel, but did not succeed.

Marco then remembers that the mute lady is his nanny when he was little. He confronts her and she finally gives in. The next day Justice Sung figured out a way to help the mute lady. After a conflict with his son's tutor, Justice Sung was put on trial for trying to kill the tutor. He said that the tutor was one of the main reasons that he and his wife always argued so Justice Sung attacked him. While in the market, the tutor attacked Justice Sung back and claims that it was for self-defense. Justice Sung said that the tutor is right in attacking him for self-defense. Marco agrees in this and asks Justice Sung to be punished. Justice Sung then uses the same analogy with the mute woman and her husband. Marco sees that this analogy is credible and sets free his nanny.

Marco tries to persuade some of the other generals to help free his nanny, but got refuted by them. He felt useless and Margaret tried to cheer him up. They both have feelings for each other. They decide to get married.

While Marco's nanny is in prison, Marco told her the good news and she immediately becomes surprised and shocked. She signals to him that he must see his other maid, who is now a nun. The nun told him that Marco's father had raped his nanny and she gave birth to Marco. Nobody knew of this and thought he was the legitimate son. The nanny is forced to eat coal and become mute to stay by her son. She later is kicked out of the house and sold to her currently dead husband.

Marco is shocked and gets drunk. Margaret came and he begins to avoid her for he knew that she is his half sister. He told her to go away and he would not marry and insulted her. She was sad and ran to the forest and Marco chased her. He found her hanging on a tree limb. She has hung herself and committed suicide. Marco is sad and he then asks God why is he always giving him a hard time. The next day Marco changed completely to another person. Justice Sung expects him to release the nanny, but he did not and said further investigation need to be done. Marco called in witnesses and it seems that the nanny will be found guilty.

Justice Sung is shocked to see how Marco is changed from an honest and righteous human being to a cold and heartless man, even after Margaret's body was found, he did not release a bit of emotion. He then moves out of Marco's house and begs his wife for a favor. At night, Ling Lung and Justice rescue the nanny and took her to see a Tibetan lip reader. He can translate what the nanny is trying to say. The nanny told them that the nun also knew that Marco is her son.

Marco is worried that the secret that he is the illegitimate son of the nanny will be leaked so he goes to the nun and kills her because she also knew.

Kung Chan Yeung came because Marco had said that Justice Sung tried to rescue the nanny, but the next morning the nanny is found in her jail cell. Marco is shocked and admitted his failure to do a good job.

Marco tries to get sympathy from his mother and she gives in and tells him that after she gave birth to him, she had signed a paper to sell Marco to his father's wife. Marco knew that the paper is in the mouth of his mother's dead husband, so he takes the paper out of the dead man's mouth.

The next day, Justice Sung says that there should a paper stating that Marco is the son of the nanny. So he asks for the body to be examined to see if the paper is still in his mouth. Obviously, it is not since Marco took it last night. But, then Justice Sung does an experiment. He said last night, he took the paper out of the month, but the paper was shredded and smeared so it was not conclusive evidence to prove Marco was the nanny's son. So, Justice Sung then poor some chemical in the mouth along with a fake paper to trick Marco. Justice Sung said that if anyone who touches the chemical within 12 hours will be detected by pouring another chemical into the affected area. Marco was scared and went crazy and would not allow Justice Sung to test his hand. Marco chopped off his arm and it is evident that he is real killer and son of the nanny. He is executed.

=== Chapter 27–32 ===
Justice Sung and his family moved to Beijing by Kung Chan Yeung taking them. The next day, Justice Sung received a ride; by the time he reached his destination, he realized it was in the garden around the palace to see the King's mother. It turns out Kung Chan Yeung purposely took Justice Sung to see her after years of elude from her. The Empress then forgives Justice Sung; meanwhile when Justice Sung was walking down the streets of Beijing he notice a cart, and sees Siu Chui which leads to the brothel house.

Justice Sung went to the brothel house to see Siu Chui, then he come across half-Chinese, half-English man name Fleming. Justice Sung was worried that Fleming was going to rape Siu Chui, but really they were talking and drinking wine. Justice Sung and Siu Chui discuss what's going on and turns out that she got over the death of Cho Kau. Another day in the brothel, there was a bidding of Siu Chui; however, some mysterious man won the bid. The mysterious man is Lai Sum, only this time he was accompanied by a Mr. Sunglasses. Later in the brothel, there were dead bodies, the cause was a poisonous needles and Siu Chui was still alive. But she's ill, Fleming is struggle to cure her, and finally using mold to treat the poison inside of her body.

Back in the palace, the king became ill, and Kung Chan Yeung is frustrated wondering why is this happening to him. He wanted to see the King's personal eunuch servant; he took his frustration believing it was his servant that made him sick, then he kicked him. Kung Chan Yeung is shocked that the King's servant was Lai Sam. Lai Sam explained to Kung Chan Yeung how did he became a eunuch in the palace; he told that back in Ching Yeen courtroom, the general that shot him in the penis and has no choice, but a palace to become a eunuch. Kung Chan Yeung was furious at Lai Sam thinking it was his fault that made the King ill. But the King stopped Kung Chan Yeung from beating Lai Sum up.

Soon, Fleming cured Siu Chu. After a while, Fleming was accused of murdering people in the brothel house, and Justice Sung trying to prove Fleming is innocent. Meanwhile, the King died from illness. When Justice Sung was walking in the night, he found a fan written the identity of Mr. Sunglasses by a beggar; it was the King. The next day in court, he reveal the identity of Mr. Sunglasses, but he claimed he is Mr. Sunglasses and he murder the people in the brothel, so Justice Sung is sentenced to execution. Kung Chan Yeung came to the prison cell of Justice Sung asking why did committed crime. Justice Sung said that he did it because he thought he and Kung Chan Yeung were allies, but he felt betrayed, that's why he did. Kung Chan Yeung was disappointed at Justice Sung and then he left. On his way to execution, he asked Fleming to take care of his family.

The execution is ready, but stopped by the Empress' eunuch and had him covered with a black bag. Then, the black bag was removed. It is Lai Sam; he was responsible for the murder of the King. He was executed. Meanwhile, at the garden of the palace, Justice Sung was surprise he was here and it was the Empress that saved him. Justice Sung remember the fan that the beggar gave him and run into the Empress' eunuch asking him to show the fan to the Empress. She was stunned that it was the King's hand writing. The Empress saved Justice Sung that she given him full pardon and he thanks her while bowing.

One year later, the Sung family moved and living in Hong Kong opened a physical therapy, medicine, and clinic. Justice Sung is working on getting his lawyer license in Hong Kong. As well as learning English and his son, too. Justice Sung walks with his son down the streets of Hong Kong and come across two English men arguing. But Justice Sung got involved, the two English men were annoyed of him getting into their business and one of them toss him. That's the end.

== Cast ==
=== Main cast ===
- Cheung Tat Ming as Justice Sung/Sung Sai Kit 宋世傑
- Amy Kwok as Bak Ling Lung 白玲瓏
- Dayo Wong as Lai Sam 賴三
- Waise Lee as Kung Chan Wong 恭親王

=== Song family and servants ===
- Bowie Wu as Sung Sau Ting 宋壽廷
- Peter Lai as Yi Dong 倪東
- Sherming Yiu as Bak Siu Chui 白小翠
- Lam King Kong as Yeung Chor Gau 楊初九
- Mimi Chu as Gut Ying 古英

=== Extended case ===
- Law Lok Lam as Ti Tau Jeung Kwan 鐵頭將軍
- Lee Hoi Sang as Chan Leung 陳良
- Lau Kong as 無塵大師
- Margaret Chung as Chor Chor 楚楚
- Kwok Fung as Ching Yuen Yan Koon 清遠縣官

== In other media ==
The character of Sung Sai Kit appears as the protagonist in the parody Justice, My Foot!.
