= List of TVB dramas in 2013 =

This is a list of television serial dramas released by TVB in 2013.

== Top ten drama series in ratings ==
The following is a list of the highest-rated drama series released by TVB in 2013. The list includes premiere week, final week ratings, as well as the average overall count of live Hong Kong viewers (in millions). The top five include overall ratings across all platforms.^{[A]}

Highest-rated drama series of 2013
Rank	English title	Chinese title	Average	Peak	Premiere week	Final week	HK viewers (millions)
1	Triumph In the Skies II	衝上雲宵II	30.74 (36)	41	31	38	1.95 (2.31)
2	Inbound Troubles	老表，你好嘢！	30 (35)	37	30	31	1.92 (2.24)
3	Bounty Lady	My盛Lady	28.25 (32)	31	28	28	1.83 (2.05)
4	Friendly Fire	法網狙擊	28 (31)	37	29	31	1.82 (1.99)
5	Sergeant Tabloid	女警愛作戰	27.76 (30)	34	28	28	1.78 (1.92)
6	A Great Way to Care II	仁心解碼II	27.4	32	26	29	1.76
7	A Change of Heart	好心作怪	27	33	24	30	1.73
8	Will Power	法外風雲	26.9	36	26	33	1.73
9	Always and Ever	情逆三世缘	26.65	37	28	36	1.70
10	Brother's Keeper	巨輪	26.5	33	26	29	1.70

Notes

- A Average numbers are derived from consolidated ratings as reported by Nielsen and on TVB's annual report. A consolidated rating is defined as the summation of TV ratings, online live rating, and online catch-up rating.

== Awards ==
Category/Organization	StarHub TVB Awards 25 September 2013	TVB Star Awards Malaysia 1 December 2013	TVB Anniversary Awards 16 December 2013
Best Drama	Triumph In the Skies II		
Best Actor	Bosco Wong; Witness Insecurity (from 2012)	Julian Cheung; Triumph In the Skies II	Dayo Wong; Bounty Lady
Best Actress	Tavia Yeung; Silver Spoon, Sterling Shackles (from 2012)	Linda Chung; Brother's Keeper	Kristal Tin; Brother's Keeper
Best Supporting Actor	—N/a	Him Law; Triumph In the Skies II	Benz Hui; Bounty Lady
Best Supporting Actress	—N/a	Nancy Wu; Triumph In the Skies II	Elena Kong; Triumph In the Skies II
Most Improved Actor	Him Law	Benjamin Yuen; A Change of Heart, Always and Ever, The Hippocratic Crush II	Vincent Wong; Friendly Fire, Season of Love, Sergeant Tabloid, A Change of Heart and Will Power
Most Improved Actress	Mandy Wong	Eliza Sam; Triumph In the Skies II, Sniper Standoff, The Hippocratic Crush II	
Best Theme Song	"Little Something" by Mag Lam; Season of Love	"Sequel" by Joey Yung; The Hippocratic Crush II	—N/a

== First line-up ==
These dramas air in Hong Kong from 8:00pm to 8:30pm, Monday to Friday on Jade.

Broadcast	English title (Chinese title)	Eps.	Cast and crew	Theme song(s)	Avg. rating	Genre	Ref.
(from 2012); 14 May– present	Come Home Love 愛·回家	500	Tsui Yu-on (producer) Sandy Shaw, Sin Tsui-ching (scriptwriters); Lau Dan, Tsui Wing, Lai Lok-yi, Yvonne Lam, Florence Kwok, Carlo Ng, Angel Chiang, Joey Law, Queenie Chu, Samantha Ko	"擁抱愛" (Embrace Love) by Joyce Cheng	TBA	Sitcom	

== Second line-up ==
These dramas air in Hong Kong from 8:30pm to 9:30pm, Monday to Friday on Jade.

Broadcast	English title (Chinese title)	Eps.	Cast and crew	Theme song(s)	Avg. rating	Genre	Ref.
(from 2012); 18 Dec– 11 Jan	Missing You 幸福摩天輪	20	Fong Chun-chiu (producer); Chan Ching-yee (scriptwriter); Linda Chung, Jason Chan, Lin Xiawei, Ram Chiang, Cilla Kung, Calvin Chan	"幸福歌" (Song of Happiness) by Linda Chung	26	Drama	
14 Jan– 8 Feb	Inbound Troubles 老表，你好嘢!	20	Wong Wai-sing (producer); Lung Man-hong (scriptwriter); Roger Kwok, Wong Cho-lam, Joey Meng, Ivana Wong, Louis Cheung, Angela Tong, Tommy Wong, Helena Law, Mimi Chu, Bowie Wu	"大家" (Everyone) by Ivana Wong & Wong Cho-lam	30	Comedy	
11 Feb– 8 Mar	Season of Love 戀愛季節	20	Kwan Wing-chung (producer); Wong Kwok-fai, Cat Kwan (scriptwriters); Kenneth Ma, Myolie Wu, Kate Tsui, Ron Ng, Nancy Wu, Him Law, Vincent Wong, Toby Leung, Oscar Leung	"Little Something" by Mag Lam	24.25	Romance	
11 Mar– 5 Apr	Sergeant Tabloid 女警愛作戰	21	Nelson Cheung (producer); Cat Kwan (scriptwriter); Niki Chow, Michael Tse, Mandy Wong, Matthew Ko, Océane Zhu, Koni Lui, Grace Wong, Benz Hui, Queenie Chu, Candice Chiu	"愛從心" (Love From the Heart) by Niki Chow & Michael Tse	27.76	Romantic comedy	
8 Apr– 10 May	Bullet Brain 神探高倫布	25	Lee Tim-sing (producer); Ip Kwong-yam (scriptwriter); Wayne Lai, Pierre Ngo, Sire Ma, Edwin Siu, Natalie Tong	"我的歷史" (My History) by Edwin Siu	24.2	Fantasy, Mystery	
13 May– 14 Jun	Slow Boat Home 情越海岸線	25	Leung Choi-yuen (producer); Ng Siu-tung (scriptwriter); Raymond Wong Ho-yin, Ruco Chan, Aimee Chan, Selena Li, Elaine Yiu, Matt Yeung, Cilla Kung	"還想" (Still Want) by Kay Tse	26.2	Romance	
17 Jun– 12 Jul	Awfully Lawful 熟男有惑	20	Lam Chi-wah (producer); Chan Kam-ling, Wong Kwok-fai (scriptwriters); Roger Kwok, Johnson Lee, Pal Sinn, Raymond Cho, Sharon Chan, Selena Li, Joyce Tang, Grace Wong	"半生熟男" (Half-Cooked Men) by Roger Kwok, Johnson Lee, Pal Sinn, Raymond Cho	26.25	Legal comedy drama	
15 Jul– 9 Aug	Karma Rider 師父·明白了	20	Chan Yiu-chuen (producer); Miu Tin (scriptwriter); Raymond Wong Ho-yin, Priscilla Wong, Mak Cheung-ching, Yoyo Chen, Leung Ka-ki, Helena Law, Katy Kung, Cilla Kung, Matt Yeung	Opening: "明白了" (Understood) by Hubert Wu Ending: "化蝶" (Into a Butterfly) by Hubert Wu	23.7	Historical period drama	
12 Aug– 22 Sep	Always and Ever 情逆三世緣	31	Chong Wai-Kin (producer); Yip Tin-shing (scriptwriter); Bobby Au-Yeung, Esther Kwan, Pierre Ngo, Mandy Wong, Ben Wong, Derek Kok, Rebecca Zhu, Ram Chiang, Benjamin Yuen, Sammy Sum, Christine Kuo	"實屬巧合" (Coincidence) by Shirley Kwan	26.65	Fantasy, Romance	
23 Sep– 2 Nov	Brother's Keeper 巨輪	32	Amy Wong (producer); Ng Siu-tung (scriptwriter); Ruco Chan, Linda Chung, Edwin Siu, Kristal Tin, Louis Yuen, Louise Lee, Lau Kong, Louis Cheung, Joseph Lee	"巨輪" (Big Wheel) by Ruco Chan & Edwin Siu	26.5	Drama	
4 Nov– 15 Dec	The Hippocratic Crush II; On Call 36小時II	30	Poon Ka-tak (producer); Lam Chung-pong (scriptwriter); Lawrence Ng, Kenneth Ma, Tavia Yeung, Louisa So, Him Law, Mandy Wong, Benjamin Yuen, Eliza Sam, Koo Ming-wah, Tracy Chu, Ben Wong, Derek Kok, Paisley Hu	"續集" (Sequel) by Joey Yung	26.1	Medical drama	
17 Dec– 10 Jan 2014	Return of the Silver Tongue 舌劍上的公堂	25	Lee Yim-fong (producer); Roger Kwok, Kristal Tin, Priscilla Wong, Evergreen Mak, Jerry Lamb, KK Cheung, Fred Cheng, Whitney Hui, Grace Wong, Rachel Kan, Yu Yeung, Yu Chi-ming, Suet Nei	"兩句" by Fred Cheng & Kristal Tin	25	Historical period legal drama	

== Third line-up ==
These dramas air in Hong Kong from 9:30pm to 10:30pm, Monday to Friday on Jade.

Broadcast	English title (Chinese title)	Eps.	Cast and crew	Theme song(s)	Avg. rating	Genre	Ref.
(from 2012); 18 Dec– 18 Jan	Friendly Fire 法網狙擊	26	Jazz Boon (producer); Ng Lap-kwong, Tong Kin-ping (scriptwriters); Michael Tse, Tavia Yeung, Sammy Leung, Sharon Chan, Louis Yuen, Benz Hui, Alice Chan, Vincent Wong, Oscar Leung	"疑幻人生" (Life of Illusion) by Michael Tse & Sammy Leung	28	Legal drama	
21 Jan– 15 Feb	The Day of Days 初五啟市錄	20	Leung Choi-yuen (producer); Chan Ching-yee (scriptwriters); Raymond Wong Ho-yin, Sonija Kwok, Sunny Chan, Lin Xiawei, Matt Yeung, Patrick Tang, Mak Cheung-ching, Cilla Kung	"揮春啟示錄" (Fai Chun Revelation) by FAMA	25.6	Drama	
18 Feb– 15 Mar	Reality Check 心路GPS	20	Lee Yim-fong (producer); Lau Chi-wah (scriptwriter); Louise Lee, Ruco Chan, Evergreen Mak, Priscilla Wong, Rebecca Chan, Stanley Cheung	"小草" (Little Grass) by Ruco Chan	25.75	Drama	
18 Mar– 19 Apr	A Great Way to Care II 仁心解碼II	25	Marco Law (producer); Kwan Chung-ling (scriptwriter); Alex Fong, Tavia Yeung, Yoyo Mung, Ben Wong, Edwin Siu, Aimee Chan, Ram Chiang, Power Chan, Oscar Leung	"圍牆" (Enclosure) by Edwin Siu	27.4	Medical drama, Police procedural	
22 Apr– 31 May	Beauty at War 金枝慾孽貳	30	Jonathan Chik (producer); Chow Yuk-ming (scriptwriter); Sheren Tang, Ada Choi, Christine Ng, Moses Chan, Kenny Wong, Eddie Kwan	Opening: "紅孽" (Red Sin) by Christine Ng; Ending: "紫禁飄謠" (Drifting Rumours of the Forbidden City) by Christine Ng & Moses Chan	20.6	Historical period drama, Romance	
3 Jun– 12 Jul	A Change of Heart 好心作怪	30	Nelson Cheung (producer); Pang Mei-fung, Leung Yan-tung (scriptwriters); Michael Miu, Bosco Wong, Niki Chow, Joey Meng, Mandy Wong, Vincent Wong, Elaine Yiu, Benjamin Yuen, JJ Jia	Opening: "心變" (A Change of Heart) by Niki Chow; Ending: "最後祝福" (Final Blessing) by Bosco Wong	27	Drama	
15 Jul– 8 Sep	Triumph In the Skies II 衝上雲霄II	43	Au Koon-ying (producer, scriptwriter); Joe Chan (producer); Lo Mei-wan (scriptwriter); Francis Ng, Julian Cheung, Myolie Wu, Fala Chen, Ron Ng, Kenneth Ma, Nancy Wu, Him Law, Elena Kong	Opening: "衝上雲霄" (Soaring in the Skies) by George Lam; Ending 1: "空中戀人" (Lovers in the Sky) by Mag Lam; Ending 2: "On My Way" by Raymond Lam	30.74	Drama	
9 Sep– 11 Oct	Sniper Standoff 神鎗狙擊	25	Kwan Wing-chung (producer); Ng Lap-kwong (scriptwriter); Eddie Cheung, Michael Tse, Kathy Chow, Kate Tsui, Eliza Sam, Joseph Lee, Alice Chan	"狙擊人生" (Sniper Life) by Michael Tse	25.6	Action	
14 Oct– 22 Nov	Will Power 法外風雲	32	Tsui Ching-hong (producer); Law Chung-yiu (scriptwriter); Wayne Lai, Moses Chan, Fala Chen, Christine Ng, Jason Chan, Sire Ma, Elliot Ngok, Chung King-fai, Vincent Wong	"遺物" (Remnants) by Alfred Hui	26.9	Legal drama, Comedy	
25 Nov– 20 Dec	Bounty Lady; My盛Lady	20	Man Wai-hung (producer); Leung Yan-tung, Lo Mei-wan (scriptwriters); Dayo Wong, Kate Tsui, Sharon Chan, Louis Yuen, Benz Hui, Elena Kong, Toby Leung, Jazz Lam, Samantha Ko, May Chan	"My盛Lady"(Bounty Lady) by Dayo Wong	28.25	Comedy	
23 Dec– 17 January 2014	Coffee Cat Mama 貓屎媽媽	20	Nelson Cheung (producer); Chan Kam-ling, Wong Kwok-fai (scriptwriters); Michelle Yim, Bosco Wong, Nancy Wu, Vincent Wong, Koo Ming-wah, Eliza Sam, Miki Yeung	"鬥快"(Compete in speed) by Hubert Wu	24	Comedy	

== Notes ==
- Inbound Troubles 老表，你好嘢！; Copyright notice: 2012.
- Sergeant Tabloid 女警愛作戰; Released overseas on April 2, 2012. Copyright notice: 2012.
- Bullet Brain 神探高倫布; Copyright notice: 2012.
