= 2013 TVB Star Awards Malaysia =

- Date: 1 December 2013
- Location: Star Stage@KWC
- Hosted by: Luisa Maria Leitão, Wong Cho-lam, Jarvis Chow

Television/radio coverage
- Network: Astro Wah Lai Toi, TVB Entertainment News
- Produced by: TVB Entertainment News

The 2013 TVB Star Awards Malaysia (simplified Chinese: TVB 马来西亚星光荟萃颁奖典礼2013; traditional Chinese: TVB 馬來西亞星光薈萃頒獎典禮2013), presented by TVB Entertainment News, Astro, and MY FM in Malaysia, was an awards ceremony that recognised the best Hong Kong television programmes that had aired on Malaysia's Astro Wah Lai Toi in 2013. It replaced the My AOD Favourites Awards.

The ceremony took place on 1 December 2013 at the Star Stage@KWC in Kuala Lumpur, Malaysia. It aired live on Malaysia's Astro Wah Lai Toi and Hong Kong's TVB Entertainment News channel.

== Winners and nominees ==
Winners are listed first, highlighted in boldface. The top five nominees are also highlighted in boldface.

=== Programs ===
My Favourite Drama Series	My Favourite TVB Drama Song
**Triumph in the Skies II**; **Inbound Troubles**; **Brother's Keeper**; **Will Power**; **The Hippocratic Crush II**; Season of Love; A Great Way to Care II; Slow Boat Home; A Change of Heart; Awfully Lawful; Always and Ever; Sniper Standoff	**"Sequel" (续集) from The Hippocratic Crush – performed by Joey Yung**; "Enclosure" (围墙) from A Great Way to Care II – performed by Edwin Siu; "Understood" (明白了) from Karma Rider – performed by Hubert Wu; "Triumph In the Skies" (冲上云霄) from Triumph In the Skies – performed by George Lam; "Unexpected" (意想不到) from Always and Ever – performed by Ngo Ka-nin
My Favourite TVB Variety Programme	My Favourite TVB Informative Programme
**Super Trio Maximus**; Shop & Chop; Office of Practical Jokes; The Voice of the Stars; Pilgrimage of Wealth	**From Hand to Art**; Pilgrimage of Wealth; Hong Kong So Blessed; Sidewalk Scientist; Xtreme Marathon

=== Acting and hosting ===
Winners are listed first, highlighted in boldface. The top five nominees are also highlighted in boldface.

My Favourite TVB Actor in a Leading Role	My Favourite TVB Actress in a Leading Role
**Julian Cheung – Triumph In the Skies II as Jayden Koo**; **Bosco Wong – A Change of Heart as Yiu Yat-san / Yiu Yuet-san**; **Francis Ng – Triumph In the Skies II as Samuel "Sam" Tong**; **Ruco Chan – Brother's Keeper as Kiu Tin-seng**; **Kenneth Ma – The Hippocratic Crush II Cheung Yat-kin**; Roger Kwok – Inbound Troubles as Ng Ka-yee; Wong Cho-lam – Inbound Troubles as Choi Sum; Ron Ng – Triumph In the Skies II as Isaac Tong; Edwin Siu – Brother's Keeper as Lo Wai-son; Moses Chan – Will Power as Morris Lee; Wayne Lai – Will Power as Wilson Yu; Lawrence Ng – The Hippocratic Crush II as Lokman Lok	**Linda Chung – Brother's Keeper as Rachel Cheuk**; **Fala Chen – Triumph In the Skies II as Holiday "Holly" Ho**; **Myolie Wu – Triumph In the Skies II as Summer Ku**; **Kristal Tin – Brother's Keeper as Yiu Man-ying**; **Tavia Yeung – The Hippocratic Crush II as Fan Tze-yu**; Sharon Chan – Friendly Fire as Ai Mei-san; Nancy Wu – Season of Love as Kim Ho; Louise Lee – Reality Check as Lui Chui-wan; Niki Chow – A Change of Heart as Yuen Siu-kat; Joey Meng – A Change of Heart as Tong Sin-hang; Esther Kwan – Always and Ever as Hon Seung-seung, Tin Chau-fung and Phoenix Yeung; Kate Tsui – Sniper Standoff as Sheung-koon Ming-chu
My Favourite TVB Actor in a Supporting Role	My Favourite TVB Actress in a Supporting Role
**Him Law – Triumph In the Skies II as Jim Jim**; **Edwin Siu – A Great Way to Care II as Jackson Leung**; **Vincent Wong – A Change of Heart as Tong Sin-chi**; **Ngo Ka-nin – Always and Ever as Yuen Kwai**; **Benjamin Yuen – The Hippocratic Crush II as Benjamin Lau**; Pal Sinn – Awfully Lawful as Jazz Lam; Patrick Dunn – Triumph In the Skies II as Tony Ching; Ben Wong – Always and Ever as Ko Kai-on; Louis Yuen – Brother's Keeper as Lung Fei; Jason Chan Chi-san – Will Power as Ching Kar-ming	**Nancy Wu – Triumph In the Skies II as CoCo Cheuk**; **Ivana Wong – Inbound Troubles as Ng Chi-ching**; **Mandy Wong – A Change of Heart as Ha Sze-ka**; **Elena Kong – Triumph In the Skies II as Heather Fong**; **Eliza Sam – Sniper Standoff as Lai Chun**; Samantha Ko – Friendly Fire as KiKi Kei; Angela Tong – Inbound Troubles as Szema Shuk-chun; Christine Kuo – A Great Way to Care II as Scarlett Chan; Grace Wong – Awfully Lawful as Honey Yau; Rebecca Zhu – Always and Ever as Lam Yim-fong
My Favourite TVB Promising Actor	My Favourite TVB Promising Actress
**Benjamin Yuen – A Change of Heart, Always and Ever and The Hippocratic Crush II**; Jason Chan Chi-san – Missing You and Will Power; William Chak – Season of Love, Triumph In the Skies II and Sniper Standoff; Sammy Sum – The Day of Days, A Change of Heart and Always and Ever; Matt Yeung – The Day of Days, Slow Boat Home and Karma Rider	**Eliza Sam – Triumph in the Skies II, Sniper Standoff and The Hippocratic Crush II**; Priscilla Wong – Reality Check and Karma Rider; Elaine Yiu – Slow Boat Home and A Change of Heart; Grace Wong – Awfully Lawful and The Hippocratic Crush II; Rebecca Zhu – Triumph In the Skies II and Always and Ever
My Favourite TVB On-Screen Couple	My Favourite TVB Variety Show Host
**Kenneth Ma and Tavia Yeung – The Hippocratic Crush**; **Francis Ng and Fala Chen – Triumph In the Skies II**; **Julian Cheung and Fala Chen – Triumph In the Skies II**; **Ron Ng and Myolie Wu – Triumph In the Skies II**; **Ruco Chan and Linda Chung – Brother's Keeper**; Roger Kwok and Joey Meng – Inbound Troubles; Louis Cheung and Ivana Wong – Inbound Troubles; Bosco Wong and Niki Chow – A Change of Heart; Him Law and Nancy Wu – Triumph In the Skies II; Bobby Au-yeung and Esther Kwan – Always and Ever	**Eric Tsang, Chin Ka-lok, Jerry Lamb, Jordan Chan, Louis Yuen, King Kong Lee, Elvina Kong, Nancy Kan, Otto Wong, Wong Cho-lam – Super Trio Maximus**; Maria Cordero – Shop & Chop; Johnson Lee – Office of Practical Jokes; Tony Hung and Priscilla Wong – Pilgrimage of Wealth; Carol Cheng and Amigo Choi – The Voice of the Stars
My Favourite TVB Characters	
Wong Cho-lam – Inbound Troubles as Choi Sum; Bosco Wong – A Change of Heart as Yiu Yat-san / Yiu Yuet-san; Francis Ng – Triumph In the Skies II as Samuel "Sam" Tong; Julian Cheung – Triumph In the Skies II as Jayden Koo; Fala Chen – Triumph In the Skies II as Holiday "Holly" Ho; Myolie Wu – Triumph In the Skies II as Summer Koo; Ron Ng – Triumph In the Skies II as Isaac Tong; Nancy Wu – Triumph In the Skies II as CoCo Cheuk; Ruco Chan – Brother's Keeper as Kiu Tin-seng; Edwin Siu – Brother's Keeper as Lo Wai-son; Linda Chung – Brother's Keeper as Rachel Cheuk; Kristal Tin – Brother's Keeper as Yiu Man-ying; Kenneth Ma – The Hippocratic Crush II as Cheung Yat-kin; Tavia Yeung – The Hippocratic Crush II as Hong Tze-yu; Mandy Wong – The Hippocratic Crush II as Hung Mei-suet	
