= Joe Junior =

Hong Kong singer

- 羅利期
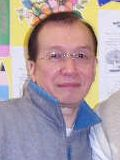
- Junior in 2009
- Born: Jose Maria Rodrigues Jr. July 22, 1946 (age 80); Wan Chai, British Hong Kong
- Occupations: Actor; singer
- Years active: 1965–present
- Spouse: Susanna Chan (m. 1985)

Chinese name
- Traditional Chinese: 羅利期
- Simplified Chinese: 罗利期
Transcriptions
Standard Mandarin
- Hanyu Pinyin: Luó Lìqí
Yue: Cantonese
- Jyutping: lo4 lei6 kei4
- Musical career
- Origin: Macao
- Genre: Hong Kong English pop
- Instrument: Vocals

Joe Junior (born Jose Maria Rodrigues Jr.) is a Hong Kong English pop singer from Macau who as active during the 1960s. He has since been in a number of TVB drama series in the 1990s and 2000s playing older character roles. He has regularly appeared on TV music programs as a host and performer. Some of his notable singles are: Here's a Heart, Deborah, Voice of Love, The End, and I Got To Find a Cupid.

Rodrigues' family is from Macau and is of Macanese (mixed Chinese and Portuguese) ancestry.

== Filmography ==
- Security Unlimited (1981)
- Cageman (1992)
- SDU'97 (特種飛虎) (1997)
- The Duke of Mount Deer (1998)
- Bishonen (1998)
- Feminine Masculinity (1999)
- War of the Genders (2000)
- Gods of Honour (2001)
- Troublesome Night 14 (2002)
- The 'W' Files (2003)
- Ups and Downs in the Sea of Love (2003)
- The Conqueror's Story (2004)
- D.I.E. (2008)
- No Regrets (2010)
- Ghetto Justice (2011)
- When Heaven Burns (2011-2012)
- L'Escargot (2012)
- Master of Play (2012)
- Bullet Brain (2013)
- A Change of Heart (2013)
- Awfully Lawful (2013)
- Sniper Standoff (2013)
- Return of the Silver Tongue (2013-2014)
- Line Walker (2014)
- All That Is Bitter Is Sweet (2014)
- Noblesse Oblige (2014-2015)
- Smooth Talker (2015)
- Ghost of Relativity (2015)
- Every Step You Take (2015)
- Speed of Life (2016)
- Buddy Cops (2016)
