= Sammy Sum =

Hong Kong actor

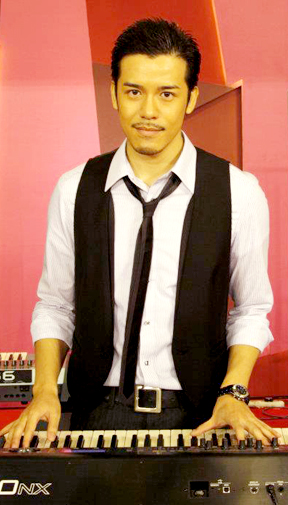
- Sum in 2011
- Born: 4 May 1983 (age 43); British Hong Kong
- Occupation: Actor
- Years active: 2007–present

Chinese name
- Traditional Chinese: 沈震軒
- Simplified Chinese: 沈震轩
Transcriptions
Standard Mandarin
- Hanyu Pinyin: Shén Zhènxuān
Yue: Cantonese
- Jyutping: Sam2 Zan3-hin1

Sammy Sum Chun-hin (born 4 May 1983) is an actor based in Hong Kong.

== Biography ==
Sammy Sum speaks fluent Cantonese, Chinese, French and English. He was born in Hong Kong, but at the age of 10 Sum moved to Montreal, Quebec, Canada with his family, where he spent all of his adolescent years until his early 20s. He moved back to Hong Kong in his mid 20s and entered the TVB entertainment business including starring in Hong Kong films.

In 2006, Sum auditioned for TVbeople, a talent casting system hosted by TVB, and was selected to sign a two-year artiste contract with the company along with six other winners. Before acting in dramas, he joined TVB's acting classes and graduated from TVB's 22nd Artiste Training Class of 2007.

In 2014, Sum gained recognition with his performance in the crime drama Line Walker, for which he was nominated for Most Improved Male Artiste at the TVB Anniversary Awards.

== Filmography ==
=== Television dramas ===
| Title | Year | Role | Notes |
|---|---|---|---|
| Speech of Silence | 2008 | | Episode 20 |
| Off Pedder | 2008–10 | Yuen Po-hin | Sitcom recurring character |
| Pages of Treasures | 2008 | Police officer | Episode 17 |
| The Greatness of a Hero | 2009 | Soldier | Episodes 4–5 |
| The King of Snooker | 2009 | Guest | Episode 3 |
| E.U. | 2009 | Kin | |
| A Bride for a Ride | 2009 | Jinyiwei soldier | |
| Just Love II | 2009 | Lee King-ho's friend | Episode 23 |
| The Threshold of a Persona | 2009 | Triad member | |
| Burning Flame III | 2009 | Derek | |
| Sweetness in the Salt | 2009 | Follower | |
| D.I.E. Again | 2009 | News reporter | |
| In the Chamber of Bliss | 2009 | Mr. Kwok | Episode 7 |
| A Chip Off the Old Block | 2009 | Police officer | |
| My Better Half | 2010 | Ducky Ming | |
| Gun Metal Grey | 2010 | Police Diver | |
| In the Eye of the Beholder | 2010 | Villager | Episode 9 |
| A Fistful of Stances | 2010 | Ching | |
| Fly with Me | 2010 | Forensics specialist | Episode 4 |
| When Lanes Merge | 2010 | Forensics specialist | |
| Growing Through Life | 2010 | Real estate manager | |
| Twilight Investigation | 2010 | Security guard | |
| Links to Temptation | 2010 | Leader | |
| A Great Way to Care | 2011 | Waiter | |
| Grace Under Fire | 2011 | a "john" | |
| Yes, Sir. Sorry, Sir! | 2011 | Boyfriend | |
| Be Home for Dinner | 2011 | Lee Yan-tik | Sitcom |
| The Other Truth | 2011 | Bartender | |
| Lives of Omission | 2011 | Bao Deng / Ho Chee-deng | |
| Forensic Heroes III | 2011 | PC Lai Ming-wai | |
| When Heaven Burns | 2011 | Guitarist | Episode 25 |
| Master of Play | 2012 | Jerry | |
| King Maker | 2012 | Yeung Kuk | |
| Silver Spoon, Sterling Shackles | 2012 | Aisin Gioro Erxi | |
| Friendly Fire | 2012-13 | Poon Hing | |
| The Day of Days | 2013 | Brother Lung | |
| Slow Boat Home | 2013 | Albert Dino | |
| A Change of Heart | 2013 | Chui Tung-kin | |
| Always and Ever | 2013 | Lau Chuen | |
| Bounty Lady | 2013 | Lau Pat-kin | |
| Line Walker | 2014 | Kobe Lin Ho-kan | |
| All That Is Bitter Is Sweet | 2014 | Ngai Chun | |
| Young Charioteers | 2015 | Fighting Yip Fai-ting | |
| Come with Me | 2016 | To Tak-kee | |
| Shadow of Justice | 2018 | Ah Kwong | |
| The Impossible 3 | 2020 | Luk Ka-ming | |
| Final Destiny | 2021 | Fong Chi-pang | |
| I’ve Got The Power | 2022 | Cheung Kin-wai | |
| See Her Again | 2024 | Cheung Keong | |

=== Films ===
| Title | Year | Role | Notes |
|---|---|---|---|
| Run Papa Run | 2008 | Tin-yun's bodyguard | |
| Poker King | 2009 | Uno's subordinate | |
| 72 Tenants of Prosperity | 2010 | Customer neighbour | |
| La Comédie humaine | 2010 | Beach boy | |
| Perfect Wedding | 2010 | Louis' friend | |
| Lan Kwai Fong 2 | 2012 | Don (LKF USB) | Nominated—Hong Kong Film Award for Best New Performer |
| Young and Dangerous: Reloaded | 2013 | Ugly Kwan | |
| From Vegas to Macau | 2014 | Ken's enforcer | |
| Are You Here | 2015 | | |
