= Come with Me (TV series) =

2016 Hong Kong television series

- Official poster
- 性在有情
- Genre: Modern Drama, Comedy
- Created by: Jazz Boon
- Written by: Leung Yan-tung(head writer), Zhang Zong Qi, Wong Beng Yee, Lee Hui Yee, Wong Jing Man, Yip Hao Ching
- Starring: Eddie Cheung; Sharon Chan; Elena Kong; Louis Yuen; Benz Hui; May Chan; Sammy Sum; Grace Wong
- Theme music composer: Alan Cheung
- Opening theme: "Speak" (講) by Sharon Chan, Louis Yuen, Grace Wong, Hoffman Cheng, Stephanie Ho, Ronald Law
- Country of origin: Hong Kong
- Original language: Cantonese
- No. of episodes: 20

Production
- Executive producer: Catherine Tsang
- Producer: Jazz Boon
- Production location: Hong Kong
- Editor: Leung Yan-tung
- Camera setup: Multi camera
- Running time: 45 minutes
- Production company: TVB

Original release
- Network: myTV SUPER
- Release: 4 June – 25 June 2016

Come with Me
- Traditional Chinese: 性在有情
- Literal meaning: "Have Sexual Feelings"
Transcriptions
Standard Mandarin
- Hanyu Pinyin: xìng zài yǒu qíng
Yue: Cantonese
- Jyutping: sing3 zoi6 jau5 cing4

Come with Me (Chinese: 性在有情; Jyutping: sing3 zoi6 jau5 cing4; literally "Have Sexual Feelings") is a 2016 Hong Kong comedy web drama produced by Jazz Boon for TVB, starring Eddie Cheung, Sharon Chan, Elena Kong, Louis Yuen, Benz Hui, May Chan, Sammy Sum and Grace Wong as the main cast. It premiered on Hong Kong's TVB web streaming site "myTV SUPER" on June 4, 2016, with five episodes released each Saturday at 12:00 am. The series concluded on June 25, 2016 with a total of 20 episodes. Overseas, the drama aired from May 29 to June 17, 2017 in the 9:30 time slot as a result of TVB Jade airing a remastered version of Phoenix Rising. An 18-episode cut version of the drama would later air in 2017 on TVB Jade.

Come with Me was shelved for a year and a half. The sex theme topic of the drama was deemed inappropriate to be aired during network television prime time. Only when TVB's new online streaming platform "myTV SUPER" was launched in 2016, the drama was able to be aired online as it was able to bypass Hong Kong's strict censor rules.

The series shares a similar theme with Sexpedia, a Hong Kong Television Network series that debuted in April 2015.

== Synopsis ==
Sex counselor Mok Tai-hung (Eddie Cheung) and sex therapist Lam Ching-yee (Sharon Chan) have been dating for five years. The two love each other very much and want to take their relationship to the next step by getting married. But Ching-yee's strict and conservative mother Liu Doi-lam, is highly against them being together due to Tai-hung's financial status, him being a bit older than her daughter and also him having a son from a previous relationship. Tai-hung puts up with Ching-yee's mother bias of him and hopes she will come around one day. After the two are married they still find roadblocks in their relationship as Tai-hung constantly has to put up with his new mother in-law to show he is the perfect son in-law. While Ching-yee has to adjust to life at Tai-hung's family home and tries not to offend her mother in-law who overly tries to be helpful but only makes matters worst.

Tai-hung's immature friend Kam Cheung (Louis Yuen) once lived an affluent life, until he was swindled out of his inheritance. Now he lives a desolated life in a small rundown apartment where he can't even afford to pay his electric bill. When he cons Tai-hung's equally immature younger sister Mok Siu-tou (Elena Kong) into lending him money to start his underwear business, he didn't expect her to cling onto him until he repays her. Tai-hung helps Cheung repay his debt to Siu-tou, Cheung does not learn his lesson and uses Siu-tou's identity as a co-signer when he takes out a loan from loan sharks.

Meanwhile, Ching-yee's uncle Liu Chun-cheung (Benz Hui), who is in his late middle age is getting married for the first time. His much younger newly wed wife Tong Tim-tim (May Chan) just immigrated to Hong Kong from mainland China, not long after marrying Chun-cheung. Ching-yee's mother Liu Doi-lam, who has taken care of her dependent older brother all her life does not trust Tim-tim and is afraid that Tim-tim will con her brother, even when the entire family tells her, Chun-cheung doesn't have anything worth conning. The problem with Chun-cheung and Tim-tim's marriage is, he finds himself unable to keep up with his wife's sex drive as she wants to have intimacy every night. Even with the help of his friends in helping him avoid having sex with his wife each night, Chun-cheung finds himself unable to resist Tim-tim when she is in costume for foreplay.

At Ching-yee's younger sister's high school, extreme conservative literature teacher To Tak-kee (Sammy Sum), feels that all the students should be like him, remain a virgin until marriage. When he sees students from his ultra conservative all girls school mingle with the opposite sex from another school he goes as far as to stalk them after school and then telling them to stop seeing the male students from the other school or else he will tell their parents. When Tak-kee finds out that fellow teacher Emma Chung (Grace Wong) lives a promiscuous life outside of work he threatens to tell the school principal. Emma won't allow him the chance to tell the principle about her secret lifestyle, when she tries to seduce him and then uses that against him.

== Cast ==
=== Mok family ===
- Helena Law as Lee Ho (李好; homophone to 你好, How are you?)

Mok Tai-hung and Siu-tou's supportive mother. She desperate wants to see Tai-hung and Ching-yee get married. Being a smothered mother to Siu-tou has left Siu-tou acting immature and dependent on Tai-hung. She always tries to help her children but end up making the matter worst.

- Eddie Cheung as Mok Tai-hung (莫大雄)

Lee Ho's son. Siu-tou's older brother. Man-wai's single father. Ching-yee's longtime boyfriend, later husband. He works as a sex counselor at the same center as Ching-yee. Liu Doi-lam does not approve of him being with her daughter because of his unimpressive background and finances.

- Elena Kong as Mok Siu-tou (莫小桃)

Lee Ho's daughter. Younger sister to Tai-hung, whom she calls "Oppa". She is obsessed with Korean dramas to the point where attends fan meetings when her favorite idol visits Hong Kong. She manages her own custom window treatment shop. Kam Cheung, cons her into lending him money.

- Ivan Chan as Mok Man-wai (莫文衛; homophone to Karen Mok's Chinese name 莫文蔚)

Mok Tai-hung's young son from a previous relationship.

=== Lam & Liu family ===
- Chung King-fai as Lam Si-yuen (林時遠)

Liu Doi-lam's long suffering husband who lets his wife bully him. Lam Ching-yi and Ceci's father.

- Angelina Lo as Liu Doi-lam 廖黛琳

Lam Si-yuen's stubborn wife. Lam Ching-yi and Ceci's mother. She is head of the PTA at Ceci's all girls high school. Pride and status is very important to her. She does not approve of Ching-yee and Tai-hung's relationship because she thinks her daughter is too good for him.

- Benz Hui as Liu Chun-cheung (廖振祥)

Liu Doi-lam's dependent older brother. Tong Tim-tim's newly wed husband. After his much younger wife immigrates to Hong Kong to be with him, he finds himself unable to keep up with her sex drive. He manages his own snack stall at a commercial arcade.

- May Chan as Tong Tim-tim (唐甜甜)

Liu Chun-cheung's much younger newly wed wife from mainland China. Due to their age difference, she has a healthier sex drive than her husband and wants to have intimacy every night. She likes to costume play to turn the intimacy mood on.

- Sharon Chan as Lam Ching-yi 林靜兒

Lam Si-yuen and Liu Doi-lam's older daughter. Ceci Lam's older sister. She is a sex therapist and works alongside her longtime boyfriend and later husband Tai-hung. She is reasonable as she learns to adjust to Tai-hung's family when they get married and move into his family home.

- Gloria Chan as Ceci Lam Ching-si (林靜思)

Lam Si-yuen and Liu Doi-lam's younger daughter. Lam Ching-yi's younger sister. She attends a conservative all girls high school where her mother is head of the PTA.

=== Moral Girls High School ===
- Samantha Chuk as Dai lai-sa (戴麗莎)
- Lily Leung as Diana
- Sammy Sum as To Tak-kee (杜德基)

Ceci's literature teacher. He is extremely passionate of Chinese poems and tends to read it wherever he goes. He is also extremely conservative as he is still a virgin and wants his students to follow his lifestyle.

- Grace Wong as Emma Chung Ying-man (鍾瑛敏) & Dan-dan (丹丹)

Emma Chung Ying-man - Chung Gwong's daughter and Dan-dan's identical twin sister. A fellow teacher at the school who tries to blackmail Tak-kee into keeping her secret life secret when he accidentally finds out about her promiscuous life outside of work. She and her twin sister were opposites. Feeling responsible for her sister's suicide she takes on her sister's persona outside of work.
Dan-dan - Emma's identical twin sister. After finding out her boyfriend liked her sister and was going to dump her she commits suicide to make Emma feel guilty for the rest of her life.

- So Lai-ming as Lai Yuet-king (黎月瓊)
- Doris Chow as Cheung Lei-chi (張莉芝)
- Christy Chan as Lee Hiu-fei (李曉菲)
- Feifei Chu as Ko Sam (高心)
- Kayley Chung as Fung Mei-jan (馮美珍)

=== Family Planning Center staff ===
- Ngai Wai Man as Choi Dong (蔡東)
- Snow Suen as Elaine Liu San (呂晨)
- Jones Lee as Yip Kwok-wah (葉國華)

=== Extended cast ===
- Louis Yuen as Kam Cheung (甘昌)

Tai-hung's immature friend. He used to live an affluent second heir life but was swindled out of his inheritance. He now goes through life asking people to lend him money. He has an extremely hairy chest and likes to frequent local prostitutes. He gets himself entangled with Mok Siu-tou when she becomes the person he constantly ask to borrow money from.

- Jess Shum as Yau Nga (邱雅)

A stock investor and later, a self-improvement instructor. Kam Cheung's girlfriend who defrauded him of his inheritance. Later she is a self-improvement instructor who uses the position to scope out potential victims to defraud. Tai-hung and Kam Cheung devise a plan to stop her from defrauding their good friend, Liu Chun-cheung.

- Gordon Siu as
- Joseph Yeung as Chung Gwong (鍾光)
- Alvis Lo as
- Ceci So as
- Nathan Ngai as
- Hoffman Cheng as Wing-ho (永豪)

An accountant that Doi-lam wanted to set up with Ching-yi. However he becomes a patient of Ching-yi and Tai-hung when his girlfriend Suk-guen tells them of his sexual obsession with leopard prints.

- Kirby Lam as Suk-guen (淑娟)

Wing-ho's suffering girlfriend. The two break up because of his weird sexual obsession.

- Alan Wan as Otto

Olivia's husband. He is a boxer who is ashamed of his small genitals.

- Kimmi Tsui as Olivia

Otto's wife. Her husband thinks that because of his genitals they cannot get pregnant.

- Mikako Leung as Mok Man-wai's teacher

== Development and production ==
- Filming took place from November 2014 till February 2015, entirely on location in Hong Kong.
- The costume fitting and blessing ceremony was held on December 23, 2014 1:00 pm at Tseung Kwan O TVB City Studio One Parking Lot.
