= Will Power (TV series) =

2013 Hong Kong television series

- Promo poster
- Genre: Drama
- Starring: Wayne Lai; Moses Chan; Fala Chen; Christine Ng; Jason Chan; Sire Ma
- Ending theme: "遺物" (Remnants) by Alfred Hui
- Country of origin: Hong Kong
- Original language: Cantonese
- No. of episodes: 32

Production
- Executive producer: Katherine Tsang
- Running time: 45 minutes
- Production company: TVB

Original release
- Network: TVB Jade, HD Jade
- Release: 14 October – 24 November 2013

Related
- Sniper Standoff; Bounty Lady

Will Power
- Traditional Chinese: 法外風雲
Transcriptions
Yue: Cantonese
- Jyutping: Fat Ngoi Fung Wan

Will Power (Chinese: 法外風雲) is the 2013 TVB Anniversary drama. It premiered on October 14, 2013.

== Synopsis ==
The two well known lawyers Yu Ying Wai, Wilson (Wayne Lai) and Lee Ming Yeung, Morris (Moses Chan) are against each other in court. Because Ying Wai wanted to win a case, it almost cost him his life and after that incident, he had a new view on life. Experienced lawyer Lo Sam Po (Elliot Ngok) viewed the changed Wai differently, and recruited him to join his law firm as a probate lawyer. Due to his debt, Yeung was forced to go back and work at his mentor Paul Sum Yik Wor's (King Sir) law firm and collaborates with his daughter and lawyer Sum Yut Kan, Eugene (Fala Chen). Kan had been in a relationship with the wealthy Sung Ka Yiu, Glibert (Vincent Wong) for many years, but Yiu loves merit too much and had no interest in ambitions, which gave Yeung an opportunity to win Kan's heart. When the hearing for a case involving a will began, the judge happened to be Wai's ex-wife and Yeung's ex-girlfriend Luk Sze Ying, Sheila (Christine Ng), the two heroes meet again, but together they discovered there was another side to the case. The person involved just happened to be Wai's apprentice Ching Ka-ming (Jason Chan), who had a huge connection to the case. The actions of the lawyer lifted a crisis of life and death...

The two lawyers battle for wins but one man goes too far to get what he wants from his biggest client...Yeung's boss.

== Cast ==
Actor / Actress	Role	Description
Wayne Lai	Wilson Yu Ying Wai	Morris' opponent in court. Works in Lo Sum Po's law firm and is Ka Ming's mentor. Sheila's ex-husband but later get together again. Early on, Wilson gets a stroke due to his eating habits, but soon recovers in a fit of agitation while in the restroom.
Moses Chan	Morris Lee Ming Yeung	Wilson's opponent in court. Elly and Sheila's ex-boyfriend. Has a crush on Eugene but never told anyone until once, he told Wilson. Got together with Eugene.
Fala Chen	Eugene Sum Yut Kan	Lawyer and Sim Yik Wor's daughter. Gilbert's girlfriend but broke up when she saw him making out with another girl on his yacht. Morris' love interest and they later got together.
Christine Ng	Sheila Luk Sze Ying	Judge in high court cases. Morris' ex-girlfriend and Bevis' love interest. Learns dancing and is Bevis' dance partner but both quitted because she didn't wanted pressure. Wilson's ex-wife but later got together again.
Jason Chan	Ching Ka Ming	Shuk Hing's son, Wilson's mentee and also works in Lo Sum Po's law firm. Nana's love interest and dates her in later episodes. Accused as the murderer who killed Gilbert in episode 29 and is actually Mr. Sung's biological son.
Sire Ma	Nana Lo Siu Lo	Lo Sum Po's daughter. Used to work as a model in a small agency but becomes a manager of her models. Was raped by Gilbert while trying to collect payment from him for Bella and Carol. Ka Ming's love interest and started dating. Had a bad relationship with her father originally but reconciled.
Vincent Wong	Gilbert Sung Ka Yiu	Mrs Sung's son and Ka-cheung's younger brother. A player and takes drugs. Gets caught doing illegal stuff a lot but often saved by Morris. Eugene's ex-boyfriend. Had a one-night stand with Nana once. Often takes drugs with Carol and Bella, they attempted to steal his money.
Elliot Yue	Lo Sam Po	Lo Siu-lo's father and Ching Shuk Hing's old friend. Opens a law firm and is competitors with Sum Yik Wor. Honest and experienced probate lawyer that handles wills.
Chung King Fai	Sum Yik Wor	Eugene's father and Lo Sam Po's competitor. Sung family's legal consultant and scheming lawyer that uses the despicable methods to get rid of evidence so they win their case. Morris' mentor. Has a weak heart and had a surgery. In the end, because he was the person who tried to get Mrs Sung to frame Ka-ming for Gilbert's murder, he is disbarred and sentenced to prison for two years on obstruction of justice and contempt of court charges.
Mary Hon	Ching Shuk Hing	Ching Ka Ming's mother and Lo Sum Po's old friend. Opens a cafe and was Mr Sung's mistress. Mrs Sung does not like her.
Susan Tse	Mrs Sung	Mother of Gilbert and Ka Cheung. Killed Gilbert but framed it on Ka-ming but went to jail in the end.
Power Chan	Sung Ka Cheung	Mrs Sung's son and Gilbert's older brother. He has autism and goes to a special school. He attends ceramic classes at Sin Ming Society.
Samantha Ko	Elly Yip Nga-lai	Morris' ex-girlfriend and the one in-charge of Sin Ming Society, that was founded with her professor husband's money.
Patrick Tang	Bevis	Sheila's dance partner and also likes Sheila. He has two sisters and he works as a doctor.

== Viewership ratings ==
Week	Episodes	Date	Average Points	Peaking Points
1	01－05	Oct 14-Oct 18, 2013	26	28
2	06－10	Oct 21-Oct 25, 2013	26	29
3	11－15	Oct 28-Nov 1, 2013	26	29
4	16－20	Nov 4-Nov 8, 2013	26	27
5	21－25	Nov 11-Nov 15, 2013	27	29
6	26－30	Nov 18, Nov 20–22, 2013	28	33
6	31－32	Nov 24, 2013	33	36

== International Broadcast ==
- Malaysia - 8TV
- Singapore - Mediacorp Channel U
