= All That Is Bitter Is Sweet =

Hong Kong television series

- Official poster
- Also known as: Big Apothecary
- 大藥坊
- Genre: Period, Medical, Romance
- Created by: Hong Kong Television Broadcasts Limited
- Written by: Yim Lei Wah (嚴麗華); Cheung Sai Chong (張世昌); Kwan Bing Hung (關炳洪); Ho Wing Nin (何永年); Lai Ga Ming (黎家明); Lai Han Gwong (蔡幸江); So Jat Kit (蘇逸傑)
- Starring: Linda Chung (鍾嘉欣); Ruco Chan (陳展鵬); Raymond Wong Ho-yin (黃浩然); Natalie Tong (唐詩詠); Pierre Ngo (敖嘉年); Sammy Sum (沈震軒); Elliot Ngok (岳華)
- Theme music composer: Joseph Koo (顧嘉煇)
- Opening theme: Self Healing (心藥) by Teresa Cheung (張德蘭)
- Ending theme: Sacrifice (大愛) by Linda Chung (鍾嘉欣)
- Composer: Linda Chung (鍾嘉欣)
- Country of origin: Hong Kong
- Original language: Cantonese
- No. of episodes: 30

Production
- Producer: Tsui Chin Hong (徐正康)
- Production location: Hong Kong
- Camera setup: Multi camera
- Running time: 45 minutes
- Production company: TVB

Original release
- Network: Jade; HD Jade
- Release: 8 September – 17 October 2014

All That Is Bitter Is Sweet
- Traditional Chinese: 大藥坊
- Literal meaning: "The Great Apothecary"
Transcriptions
Standard Mandarin
- Hanyu Pinyin: dà yào fāng
Yue: Cantonese
- Yale Romanization: dai yut fong
- Jyutping: daai6 joek6 fong1

All That Is Bitter Is Sweet (Traditional Chinese: 大藥坊; literally "The Great Apothecary") is a 2014 Hong Kong period, medical, romance drama produced by TVB, starring Linda Chung, Ruco Chan and Raymond Wong Ho-yin as the main leads, with Natalie Tong, Pierre Ngo, Sammy Sum and Elliot Ngok as the major supporting roles. Filming took place from November 2013 to February 2014. The drama began broadcasting on September 8, 2014 on TVB Jade channel during its 8:30 - 9:30 p.m. timeslot, and finished airing on October 17, 2014 with 30 episodes total.

== Synopsis ==
The show is set during the Republic of China, when each region of China was ruled by local warlords. The Dou family of Foshan is an affluent family that owns and runs Sheung Chun Tong (尚春堂), the largest traditional Chinese apothecary in town. Bad times, however, came during an epidemic. When the apothecary's product caused the death of the Mayor's eldest son (and owner Dou Sam's soon-to-be son in law), Dou Sam is imprisoned, and the apothecary was ordered closed. Sam's only daughter, Dou Gaai Kei, then took on the task of investigating her fiancé's death, in hopes of releasing her father. Together with Ding Yat Yuen, a businessman with a dubious reputation, they stumble upon a big conspiracy that could rock Chinese politics.

== Cast ==
=== Main cast ===
- Linda Chung (鍾嘉欣) as Dou Gaai Kei (杜佳期)
- Ruco Chan (陳展鵬) as Ting Yat Yuen (丁一元)
- Raymond Wong Ho-yin (黃浩然) as Chong Kei Cho (莊繼祖) / Chong Kei Chung (莊繼宗)
- Natalie Tong (唐詩詠) as Hui Kwan Yeuk (許君約)

=== Supporting cast ===
==== Dou family ====
- Yan Pak (白茵) as Ling Fung Yee (凌鳳兒)
- Du Yan Ge (杜燕歌) as Dou Sam (杜蔘)
- Shirley Yeung (楊思琦) as Fung Yuk Kam (馮玉琴)
- Pierre Ngo (敖嘉年) as Dou Yung (杜茸)

==== Chong family ====
- Pat Poon (潘志文) as Chong Deoi Yu (莊敦儒)
- Susan Tse (謝雪心) as Wai Chau Hing (衛秋卿)
- Elliot Ngok (岳華) as Hui Sung Ming (許崇明)
- Kitty Lau (劉桂芳) as Ha Jie (霞姐)
- Kate Tsang (曾琬莎) as Siu Ting (小婷)
- Lydia Law (羅欣羚) as Ha Yuk (夏玉)

==== Foshan Police ====
- Sammy Sum (沈震軒) as Ngai Chun (魏俊)
- Dickson Li (李家聲) as Man Keung (文強)
- Kong Wing Fai (江榮暉) as Mo Kit (武傑)

==== Ding Yat Yuen's gang ====
- Jazz Lam (林子善) as Hung Bing (洪炳)
- Willie Wai (韋家雄) as Wong Fu Sau (皇甫壽)
- Brian Tse (謝東閔) as Kam Fuk (金福)

==== Shun Chun Tong ====
- Yu Chi Ming (余子明) as Chong Suk (昌叔)
- Owen Cheung (張振朗) as Gai Gei Jai (枸杞仔)
- Moses Cheng (鄭詠謙) as Ah Fu (阿富)
- Aaryn Cheung (張明偉) as Ah Hoi (阿海)
- Chan Wing Chun (陳榮峻) as Physician Cheng (鄭大夫)
- Lee Hoi San (李海生) as Yeung Bak (楊伯)
- Samantha Ko (高海寧) as Pin Pin (翩翩)
- Rainbow Ching (程可為) as Hung Yut Ho (洪月好)
- Jimmy Au (歐瑞偉) as Wong Jing Wing (王正永)
- Man Yeung (楊證樺) as Secretary Yuen (阮秘書)
- Siu Koi Yan (蕭凱欣) as Cun Fa (春花)
- Christy Chan (陳潔玲) as Cau Yut (秋月)
- Akai Lee (李啟傑) as Wong Tat (王達)
- Louis Szeto (司徒暉) as Ah Fa (阿輝)
- Raymond Tsang (曾守明) as Guk's father (菊父)
- Esther Wan (溫裕紅) as Guk's mother (菊母)

== Development ==
- The Sale Presentation clip was filmed in October 2013. The 1 minute 2 second clip previewed in November 2013 features all of the main actors that are confirmed to have a role in the drama.
- On November 1, 2013 the drama costume fitting ceremony was held at Tseung Kwan O TVB City Studio One.
- The blessing ceremony took place on November 20, 2014 at Tseung Kwan O TVB City.
- On March 25, 2014, a trailer of the drama was previewed at FILMART 2014.

== Viewership ratings ==
Week	Episodes	Date	Average Points	Peaking Points
1	01－05	Sept 8-12, 2014	23	28
2	06－10	Sept 15–19, 2014	25	28
3	11－15	Sept 22–26, 2014	24	27
4	16－19	Sept 29-Oct 2, 2014	24	27
5	20－24	Oct 6-10, 2014	24	26
6	25－30	Oct 13–17, 2014	25	29
