= Patrick Tang =

Hong Kong director, songwriter, singer, actor and TV show host

- 鄧健泓
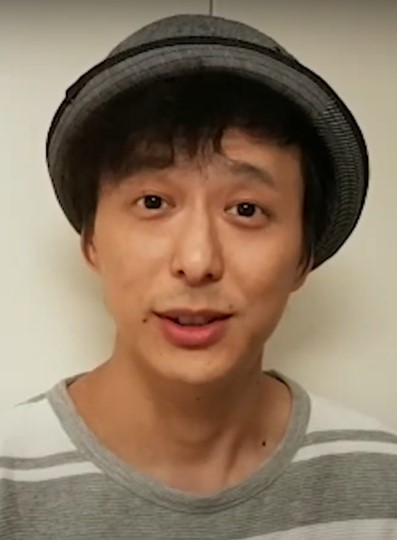
- Tang in 2018
- Born: 6 May 1974 (age 52); British Hong Kong
- Spouse: Sukie Shek (m. 2017)
- Partner(s): Marsha Yuen (2000–2004); Selena Lee (2004–2009); Katy Kung (2010–2012)
- Awards: TVB Anniversary Awards – Best Presenter; 2007 Foodie 2 Shoes

Chinese name
- Traditional Chinese: 鄧健泓
- Simplified Chinese: 邓健泓
Transcriptions
Standard Mandarin
- Hanyu Pinyin: Dèng Jiànhóng

Patrick Tang (Chinese: 鄧健泓; pinyin: Dèng Jiànhóng; born 6 May 1974) is a Hong Kong director, songwriter, singer, actor, and TV show host who has been involved in numerous drama and movie productions. He started his career with TVB in 2000.

He is married to singer Sukie Shek and has been based in Canada since 2022.

== Filmography ==
=== Television ===
Year	Title	Role	Notes
2000	War of the Genders	Siu Tit Nam (Man)	
2001	The Awakening Story	Suen Hing Chai (Stephen)	
2003	Triumph in the Skies	Tai Hung	Guest star (ep. 34)
2004	To Get Unstuck in Time	Yuen Chee Go (Hugo)	
2005	Just Love	So Nga Gei (AK)	
2005	Into Thin Air	Kong Fai	
2006	A Beautiful New World	Bao Jia Long	a.k.a. Love to be Found in New Here
2007	Marriage of Inconvenience	Chui Yu Duk	
2008	War of In-Laws II	Lau Ching San	
2009	The King of Snooker	Kan Tze Him	
2009	Just Love II	So Nga Gei (AK)	
2009	The Threshold of a Persona	Au Shun Fung	
2010	Gun Metal Grey	Ding Yun-hou	Guest star (ep. 21–24)
2011	7 Days in Life	Dai Siu-nam	Nominated – TVB Anniversary Award for Best Supporting Actor (Top 15)
2012	Tiger Cubs	Ben Fong	
2012	King Maker	Sheung Hei	
2012-13	Friendly Fire	Patrick	
2013	The Day of Days	Tong Siu-Yip	
2013	Slow Boat Home	Vincent	
2013	Will Power	Bevis	
2014	Line Walker	Yip Siu-leung/Marco	
2014–15	Tiger Cubs II	Ben Fong	

=== Film ===
Year	Title	Role	Notes	Ref.
2000	Textiles at Heart	Lee Sam		
2002	If U Care...	Philip	a.k.a. If You Care...	
2002	My Wife is 18	Mr. Lam		
2002	Market's Romance	Gary		
2003	Sai Kung Story	Man		
2003	My Lucky Star	Customer in cybercafe / Imperial guard		
2003	The Two Individual Package Women	Ming		
2003	Truth or Dare: 6th Floor Rear Flat	Jean		
2003	Dragon Loaded 2003	"Wickedhead" watching firework		
2003	Shiver	Ming's subordinate		
2004	Hot Cop in the City	Lam Chun / Handsome		
2004	Protégé de la Rose Noire	Rascal fighting on street	a.k.a. Black Rose Academy	
2004	Sex and the Beauties	bartender	a.k.a. Love and the City	
2004	Herbal Tea	Lance Siu	a.k.a. Herbal Tea Story	
2004	The White Dragon	Gene		
2006	Cocktail	Dave		
2006	Family Together			
2006	Wo Hu	Ball	a.k.a. Operation Undercover a.k.a. Undercover Tiger	
2007	Qing Ping Guo			
2007	The Lady Iron Chef	MC		
2007	Whispers and Moans	Tony		
2008	Love is Elsewhere	Fong Chi-Ho		
2009	The Sniper	Police Chung		
2010	Break Up Club	Sunny		
2011	I Love Hong Kong			
