= Friendly Fire (TV series) =

Hong Kong legal drama television series

- 法網狙擊
- Genre: Legal drama
- Created by: Jazz Boon
- Screenplay by: Ng Lap-kwong; Wong Kwok-fai; Cheung Suet-kuk; Tong Kin-ping; Yeung Wing-ying; Tsang Po-wah; Wan Kam-fung; Lau Chi-hang; Wong Sau0ching; Cheng Chung-tai
- Directed by: Man Wai-hung; Kwok Wai-sing; Chin Wing-chi; Hui Sui-ping
- Starring: Michael Tse; Tavia Yeung; Sammy Leung; Sharon Chan; Louis Yuen; Vincent Wong; Benz Hui; Mary Hon; Mandy Wong; Derek Kok; Alice Chan; Oscar Leung; Samantha Ko; Otto Chan; Hoffman Cheng; JJ Jia; Grace Wong
- Theme music composer: Yip Siu-chung
- Opening theme: Seemingly Imaginary Life (疑幻人生) performed by Michael Tse and Sammy Leung
- Country of origin: Hong Kong
- Original language: Cantonese
- No. of episodes: 26

Production
- Producers: Tommy Leung; Man Wai-hung
- Production location: Hong Kong
- Camera setup: Multi camera
- Production company: TVB

Original release
- Network: TVB Jade
- Release: 18 December 2012 – 19 January 2013

Friendly Fire
- Traditional Chinese: 法網狙擊
- Simplified Chinese: 法网狙击
- Literal meaning: "Justice Attack"
Transcriptions
Standard Mandarin
- Hanyu Pinyin: Fǎ Wǎng Jú Ji
Yue: Cantonese
- Yale Romanization: Faat Móng Jēui Gīk
- Jyutping: Faat3 Mong2 Zeoi1 Gik1

Friendly Fire (Chinese: 法網狙擊; Cantonese Yale: Faat Móng Jēui Gīk; literally "justice attack") is a 2012 Hong Kong legal drama television series produced by TVB under executive producers Tommy Leung and Man Wai-hung and starring Michael Tse, Tavia Yeung, Sammy Leung and Sharon Chan.

== Production ==
The series was confirmed to film by the producers on 10 February 2012. An internal costume fitting was held on 12 April 2012 at TVB City. Principal photography officially started on 29 April 2012. The blessing ceremony was held on 10 May 2012 at Tseung Kwan O TVB City Studio One Parking Lot at 3:00PM.

== Plot ==
Barrister JJ Kam (Michael Tse) and Director of Public Prosecutions Chris Fong (Tavia Yeung) used to be cohabiting lovers, but ended up separating due to a failed marriage proposal. Fate has it when JJ makes a job transition to take a position of Prosecutor, resulting in the two working under the same roof once again. With their distinctly different approaches in handling cases, plus the interference of a new secretary (Grace Wong), the already severe crisis in their relationship has been pushed to the edge to an nonredeemable state. Though JJ is still perturbed by the refusal of his marriage proposal, Chris actually has something rarely known to the others. On the other hand, an orphan Kam Po-tei (Sammy Leung), was adopted by JJ’s father Kam Po-cheung (Benz Hui), and JJ are as close as biological brothers. As a detective of the Criminal Investigation Department, Po-tei frequently cooperates with JJ. During an operation, he gets to know an undercover detective Ngai Mei-san (Sharon Chan). Though the pair are completely incompatible with each other, they do acquire the other’s strengths to offset their own deficiencies. Furthermore, Po-tei initiates to pursue Mei-san regardless of his own lot or the fact she has already a fiancé. As each of them is hesitating over their future, a murder case involving a wealthy businesswoman Pong Tit-sum (Alice Chan) makes them go through an arduous and fierce journey all together.

== Cast ==
=== Main cast ===
Cast	Role	Description
Michael Tse	JJ Kam Cho-chan 甘祖贊	The main protagonist of the series, a barrister who later joins the Department of Justice (DOJ) as a prosecutor. He was Chris Fong's boyfriend before breaking up with her in episode 7 when she mistakes him for a cheater. He finally reconciles with Chris and bears a child with her.
Tavia Yeung	Chris Fong 況天藍	The Senior Assistant Director of Public Prosecutions of DOJ and JJ Kam's girlfriend until they broke up in episode 7. Chris' female family members all died of breast cancer, and thus she was reluctant to reconcile with JJ, fearing he will leave her if she inherits the disease. She and JJ eventually reconcile and got married with a child.
Sammy Leung	Kam Po-tei 甘波地	An Inspector of the Regional Crime Unit. He is Kam Po-cheung's adopted son and JJ's adopted younger brother, sharing a close relationship with them despite not being blood-related. He later meets and eventually discovers her biological mother, Judge Helen Man.
Sharon Chan	Ngai Mei-san 艾美辰	A rookie officer of the Regional Crime Unit working as Po-tei's subordinate. She and Po-tei were initially a bickering couple before developing a relationship. She has a fiance who resides in the United States, whom she breaks up with as she was in love with Po-tei.

=== Other cast ===
Cast	Role	Description
Louis Yuen	Lok Koo-tin 洛古天	A gynecologist who is a good friend of Chris. He later dates JJ's secretary, Moon Cheuk, who admired JJ, in order to help JJ and Chris salvage their relationship.
Vincent Wong	Duncan 鄧啟善	Helen Ma's second son and Po-tei's younger half-brother who is a manager of a finance company. He was later taken advantage of by Pong Tit-sum and Oscar Pong, causing him to go broke and nearly driving him to suicide.
Benz Hui	Kam Po-cheung 甘保祥	JJ's father and Kam Po-tei's adoptive father. He was the ex-lover of Mei-san's mother, Fong Yee-ha, whom he still admires.
Mary Hon	Helen Man 文英	A judge who abandoned his first son in a soccer field during her youth. She later discovers her long-lost son to be Po-tei, and does her best to make it up to him.
Mandy Wong	Wong Fei-fei 黃菲菲	A pregnant woman from Mainland China who takes advantage of Kam Po-cheung and her aunt, Chan Chat, in order to give birth in Hong Kong. She was later arrested for blackmail and giving false testimony and also indirectly killed her child.
Derek Kok	Bill Hung 洪震滔	A deceiving barrister and JJ's nemesis. He admires Pong Tit-sum, who manipulated him to commit murder.
Alice Chan	Pong Tit-sum 龐鐵心	The chairperson of Pong Enterprises who took advantage of barrister Bill Hung's love for her to commit countless crimes.
Oscar Leung	Max Tai 戴奕行	A pupil prosecutor under JJ. He has a crush on fellow pupil prosecutor KiKi Kei and eventually develops a relationship with her.
Samantha Ko	KiKi Kei 紀慕芝	A pupil prosecutor under Chris who was raped by Oscar Pong. She later dates fellow pupil prosecutor Max Tai, who stood by her during her hardest times.
JJ Jia	Sheh Chuk-ching 佘祝青	A beautician who manipulated her lover, Nok Ching-hung, to murder her husband, Mok Wai-fu, to accumulate his wealth. She was later found guilty of murder.
Grace Wong	Moon Chuk 祝雙悅	JJ's secretary who admires him and openly pursues him. She later dates and falls in love with Lok Tin-koo when the latter pursues her to salvage JJ and Chris' relationship.
Patrick Tang	Patrick Leung 梁健柏	A police officer of the Narcotics Bureau who witnessed the murder of fellow policeman Mo Hok-lik. In order to convict the murderer, Poon Hing, he forges evidence to testify against him.
Ronan Pak (白健恩)	Oscar Pong 龐世邦	Pong Tit-sum's younger brother who raped pupil prosecutor KiKi Kei, but used his connections to get away with the crime. He was later sentenced to a year of probation of disorderly conduct and contracted HIV/AIDS later due to his sex habits.
Christine Kuo	Bella	JJ's ex-girlfriend who was hired by Chris to seduce him as a prank on his birthday.
Toby Chan (陳庭欣)		A bar girl who attempted to seduce JJ.
Sammy Sum	Poon Hing 潘興	A drug dealer who had been trailed by Kam Po-tei and Patrick Leung for years. Poon murders Po-tei's subordinate, Mo Hok-lik, which was witnessed by Patrick. He was later found guilty of murder and was sentenced to life imprisonment.
Jack Wu	Albert Ko 高柏宏	A barrister who was Bill Hung's pupil and was the representative lawyer for Sheh Chuk-ching, Poon Hing and Liu Chi-man.
Raymond Chiu (趙永洪)	Ivan Cheung 張秉	A solicitor.
Yu Chi-ming (余子明)	Fong Ching 況程	Chris Fong's father.
Chun Wong (秦煌)	Ngai Tung-fai 艾東輝	Ngai Mei-san's father who was Kam Po-cheung's rival during high school.
Rosanne Lui (呂珊)	Fong Yee-ha 方綺霞	Ngai Mei-san's mother and Kam Po-cheung's high school sweetheart.
Rainbow Ching (程可為)	Cheung Suk-Ngo 張淑娥	Kiki Kei's mother.
Kong Ming-fai (江明輝)	Ngai Ka-yam 艾家蔭	Ngai Mei-san's older brother.
Timothy Cheng (鄭子誠)	Chu Ting-lung 朱定龍	Superintendent of the Regional Crime Unit.
Patrick Dunn (鄧梓峰)	Tam Seung-king 譚尚京	Po-tei's subordinate.
Otto Chan (陳志健)	Yee Mo-sze 爾摩斯	Po-tei's subordinate.
Hoffman Cheng (鄭世豪)	Mo Hok Lik 武學力	Po-tei's subordinate who was murdered by Poon Hing.
Yeung Ying-wai (楊英偉)	CK Kwok 郭正	Deputy Director of Public Prosecutions of DOJ.
Chan Wing-chun (陳榮峻)	Chan Lok-yee 陳樂意	Prosecutor of the Advocacy Division of DOJ.
Jacky Yeung (楊鴻俊)	Law Cho-wing 羅左榮	Member of the Advocacy Division of DOJ.
Geoffrey Wong (黃子雄)	Lee Yin-chi 李賢智	Member of the Advocacy Division of DOJ.
Cindy Lee (李思雅)	Flora Lam 林麗珊	Pupil prosecutor under JJ.
James Ng (吳業坤)	George Po 布偉業	Pupil prosecutor under Chris.
Bella Lam (林穎彤)	Hannah Wai 韋天恩	Pupil prosecutor under JJ.
So Yan-chi (蘇恩磁)	Sophia	Secretary of DOJ.
Teresa Ha (夏萍)	Rosemary Chan 陳三妹	Janitor of DOJ.
Mak Ka-lun (麥嘉倫)	Wat King-kei 屈敬基	A staff at Po-cheung's cafe.
Kirby Lam (林秀怡)	Yim Chung 嚴頌	A staff at Po-cheung's cafe.
Kong Fu-keung (江富強)	Brother Kwai 柱哥	A staff at Po-cheung's cafe.
Alice Fung So-bor	Chan Chat 陳七	A janitor at Po-cheung's cafe and Wong Fei-fei's aunt.
Hugo Wong (黃子衡)	Mok Wai-fu 莫維夫	Sheh Chuk-ching's husband who was murdered by her.
Penny Chan (陳國峰)	Ngok Ching-hung 岳正雄	Sheh Chuk-ching's lover who was manipulated by her to murder Mok Wai-fu.
Coffee Lam (林芊妤)	Elaine Ho 何景怡	Sheh Chuk-ching's colleague.
Chung Chi-kwong (鍾志光)	Law Kai 羅階	An insurance intermediary who pushed and injured Wong Fei-fei, later framing Kam Po-cheung for it before he was arrested.
Owen Cheung (張振朗)	Choi Chan-lit 蔡震烈	A thug whom constantly bullies Chan Hok-suen after she reports on him for burglary in a supermarket and drove her to suicide.
Rachel Poon (潘曉彤)	Chan Hok-suen 陳學璇	A high school student who once reported on Choi Chan-lit for burglarizing a supermarket and was victimized by him as a result, leading her to suicide.
Joseph Yeung (楊瑞麟)	Liu Chi-man 廖志文	Father of Liu Kai-hei, who assaulted Yeung Piu, an arrogant punk who cut in front of him in line outside a sneaker store.
Coleman Tam (譚真一)	Liu Kai-hei 廖啟熙	Liu Chi-man's son, who witnessed his father assaulting Yeung Piu.
Jonathan Cheung	Wat Ping-yuen 屈炳源	A convict who was falsely accused for murder, resulting in a life sentence. With the help of JJ, he successfully appealed and was released without charge.
Kenneth Fok (霍健邦)	Wu Sing-keam 胡成昆	Wong Fei-fei's husband who was arrested along with his wife for blackmail and giving false testimony.
Joey Law (羅天宇)	Edward Ho 何德華	Pupil prosecutor under Chris.
Akina Hong (康華)	Lau Mei-yee 劉美儀	Ai Mei-san's sister-in-law.
Kimmy Kwan (關婉珊)	Law Wing-yan 羅穎恩	An office staff of an insurance company who was sexually harassed by her superior Wah Kam-on.
Law Tin-chi (羅天池)	Wah Kam-on 華錦安	Law Wing-yan's superior who sexually harassed her during an anniversary event of the insurance company.

== Viewership ratings ==
The following is a table that includes a list of the total ratings points based on television viewership.

Week	Originally Aired	Episodes	Average Points	Peaking Points	References
1	18–21 December 2012	1 — 4	29	31	
2	24–28 December 2012	5 — 9	27	—	
3	31 December 2012 - 4 January 2013	10 — 14	28	30	
4	7–10 January 2013	15 — 18	27		
5	14–18 January 2013	19 — 23	30	37	
5	19 January 2013	24 — 26	31	34	
