= Always and Ever =

- Promo poster
- Also known as: Love Reverses Three Lifetimes of Fate
- 情逆三世緣
- Genre: Romance; Fantasy; Historical Fiction
- Created by: Hong Kong Television Broadcasts Limited
- Starring: Bobby Au-yeung; Esther Kwan
- Opening theme: It's a Coincidence 實屬巧合 by Shirley Kwan
- Ending theme: Unexpected 意想不到 by Pierre Ngo
- Country of origin: Hong Kong
- Original language: Cantonese
- No. of episodes: 31

Production
- Producer: Chong Wai-kin
- Production locations: Hong Kong, Guangdong, Foshan
- Running time: 45 Minute
- Production company: TVB

Original release
- Network: Jade; HD Jade
- Release: August 12 – September 22, 2013

Always and Ever (traditional Chinese: 情逆三世緣; simplified Chinese: 情逆三世缘; pinyin: qíng nì sānshì yuán) is a 2013 Hong Kong TVB television romance drama serial starring Bobby Au-yeung and Esther Kwan and produced by Chong Wai-kin.

The drama follows a love story which spans three lifetimes, from Song dynasty in the 13th century (Ep 1–13) to Hong Kong in the 1950s (Ep 13–30) and to modern Hong Kong (modern era, Ep 1, 30–31). It is the first on-screen pairing of Au-yeung and Kwan in ten years, with Kwan not frequently acting due to the personal implication of taking care of her daughter.

== Plot overview ==
During an operation, CIB senior inspector, Circle Yuen (Bobby Au Yeung) accidentally kills his girlfriend, Phoenix Yeung (Esther Kwan). In his remorse, he finds himself mysteriously sent back in time to the Song dynasty, where he is known as the imperial official Bao Zheng. He meets Han Sheung-Sheung (Esther Kwan), who looks exactly like Phoenix; despite Sheung-Sheung's reservations, they fall in love and agree to marry. However, Sheung-Sheung's childhood friend and adoptive brother, Ko Yiu-On (Ben Wong), out of ambition and jealousy that Sheung-Sheung refuses to marry him, forces her into casting a curse upon herself that she will always be killed by the man she loves. Soon afterward, Yiu-On orchestrates a situation where Bao Zheng is forced into executing Sheung-Sheung.

When time shifts into the 1950s, Circle becomes Chinese Inspector Wah Lung-Piew and meets Tin Chau-Fung (Esther Kwan), the leader of a triad group who resembles Sheung-Sheung and Phoenix. However, their relationship inhibited by the fact that Chau-Fung mistakenly believes the inspector as her husband's murderer and has ordered a citywide chase for his head. While desperately trying to prove his innocence as Lung-Piew, he meets Lam Yim-Fong (Rebecca Zhu) and Yuen Kwai (Pierre Ngo), who will become Circle's parents, but is dismayed to find Yim-Fong falling in love with him as he tries to learn why his mother abruptly left his family. When fate intervenes and Lung-Piew accidentally kills Chau-Fung again, the cycle of her curse is finally broken and Circle returns to modern day Hong Kong where he is given a second chance to change his and Phoenix's fates.

== Cast ==
Note: the names of most Song Chinese characters are transliterated by TVB according to their Cantonese Chinese pronunciation; the Mandarin Chinese pronunciation of those characters' names are provided in brackets for reference if it differs from the transliteration based on Cantonese Chinese pronunciation

Main characters

- Bobby Au-yeung as Justice Pao Cheng (13th century); Wah Long-Biu, a Chinese inspector (1950s); Circle Yuen, a police senior inspector from CIB (modern era)
- Esther Kwan as Hon Seung-Seung (Han Shang-shang), a talented scholar (13th century); Tin Chau-Fung, a popular triad leader (1950s); Phoenix Yeung, a reporter (modern era)

13th century

- Cheung Kwok Keung as Emperor Renzong of Song
- Ben Wong as Ko Kai-On (Kao Chi-an). Infatuated with Hon Seung-Seung. Pao Cheng's enemy. Main villain, manipulated and killed all those around him in order to usurp the throne (13th century).
- Ram Chiang as Advisor Gongsun (Kung-sun), a famed political advisor for Justice Pao (13th century)
- Benjamin Yuen as Chin Chiu (Chan Chao), a royal guard (13th century)
- Christine Kuo as Princess Hing Sau (Princess Ching-shou) (13th century)
- JJ Jia as Consort Yin (13th century)
- Vivien Yeo as Consort Suk (Consort Shu) (13th century)

1950s

- Mandy Wong as Tin Chau-Ngan, an exotic dancer who becomes a police officer in order to kill her sister Chau-Fung (1950s). The reincarnation of Ko Kai-On (13th century)
- Pierre Ngo Ka-nin as Yuen Kwai, a police officer and radio broadcaster who becomes Circle's father (1950s, retired in modern era)
- Rebecca Zhu as Lam Yim-Fong, an exotic dancer who eventually becomes Circle's mother (1950s)
- Derek Kok as Cho Pao (1950s) triad leader, Tin Chau-Fung's enemy. Main villain (1950s)
- Sammy Sum as Lau Chuen, a police officer (1950s)

== Viewership ratings ==
Week	Episodes	Date	Average Points	Peaking Points
1	01－05	August 12-August 16, 2013	28	31
2	06－10	August 19-August 23, 2013	26	29
3	11－15	August 26-August 30, 2013	28	31
4	16－19	September 2-September 5, 2013	29	31
5	20－24	September 9-September 13, 2013	24	27
6	25－29	September 16-September 20, 2013	24	27
6	30	September 21, 2013	24	26
6	31	September 22, 2013	36	37
