= Grace Wong =

Grace Wong 王君馨
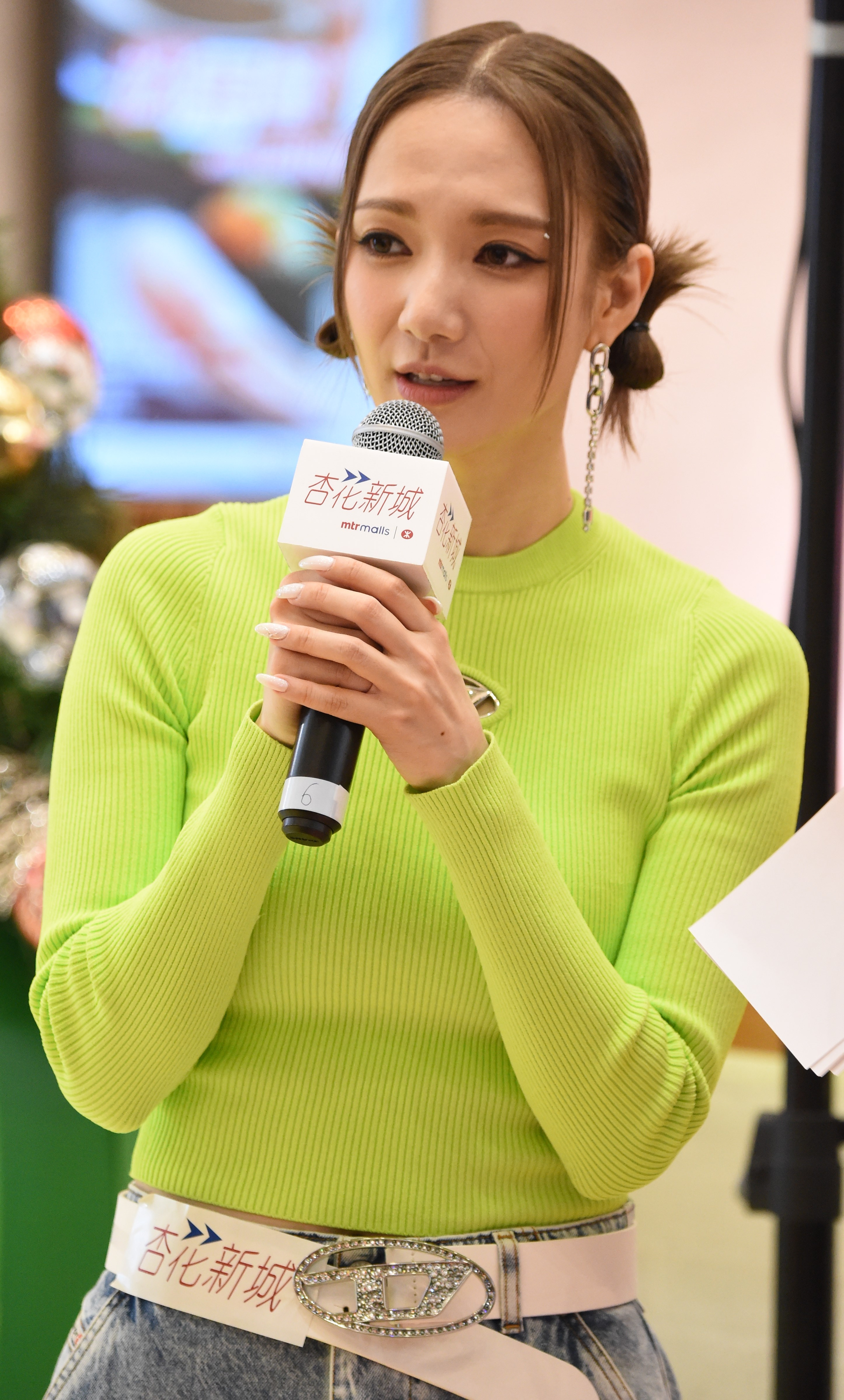
- Wong in 2023
- Born: Wong Kwan-hing; British Hong Kong
- Occupations: Actress; dancer; singer; TV host
- Years active: 2007–present
- Spouse: Daniel Chang (m. 2016)
- Awards: Miss Hong Kong 2007 – First Runner-up, Miss Photogenic & Miss International Goodwill TVB Anniversary Awards – Most Popular Female Character; 2016 A Fist Within Four Walls

Chinese name
- Traditional Chinese: 王君馨
Transcriptions
Standard Mandarin
- Hanyu Pinyin: Wáng Jūnxīn
Yue: Cantonese
- Jyutping: Wong4 Gwan1 Hing1
- Musical career
- Origin: New York City
- Instruments: Violin, clarinet, piano
- Label: TVB (2007–2021)

Grace Wong Kwan-hing (Chinese: 王君馨), is a Hong Kong actress, dancer, singer, television host and beauty pageant titleholder. She formerly contracted to TVB. She is best known for her role as Fa Man in the martial arts television drama A Fist Within Four Walls.

== Early life ==
Grace Wong was born in Hong Kong and emigrated to the United States with her family at the age of four. She grew up in Brooklyn and Queens in New York City. She attended Babson College and went to Hong Kong for an exchange program at the Chinese University of Hong Kong.

== Career ==
In December 2021, Wong announced via Weibo and Instagram that her fourteen years contract with TVB had ended. Reports suggest that she may have refused to renew her contract with TVB because she was dissatisfied that her co-star, Tiffany Lau, had more screen time than her in the drama series I've Got the Power.

In April 2022, Wong participated in the Youku-produced mainland Chinese variety show Great Dance Crew. In September 2022, she released a new single in mainland China titled "Don't Take My Love for You for Humility".

== Filmography ==
=== Television dramas ===
Title	Year	Role	Notes
2009	Born Rich	Elsa Yu Yee-lam	Cameo
2010	My Better Half	May So Sin-hung	Supporting Role
2010	OL Supreme	Margaret Chow Chi-yeuk	Supporting Role
2010	Gun Metal Grey	WPC Kong Hoi-ching (Leng Bao)	Major Supporting Role
2011	Show Me the Happy	Jackie	Ep. 34
2011	Relic of an Emissary	Chuk Yim-yim	Supporting Role
2011	The Life and Times of a Sentinel	Ngan Yeung-suet (Consort Wai)	Supporting Role
2012	House of Harmony and Vengeance	Tai Ho-sau	Major Supporting Role
2012	Tiger Cubs	Laurine Shu Tsz-lai	Ep. 8
2012–13	Friendly Fire	Moon Chuk Sheung-yuet	Supporting Role; Nominated — TVB Anniversary Award for Most Improved Female Artiste
2013	Sergeant Tabloid	WPC Goldie Kam Sui-na	Supporting Role; Nominated — TVB Anniversary Award for Most Improved Female Artiste
2013	Awfully Lawful	Honey Yau Mat	Main Role; Nominated — TVB Anniversary Award for Most Improved Female Artiste; Nominated — TVB Star Award Malaysia for Favourite TVB Supporting Actress; Nominated — TVB Star Award Malaysia for Most Promising TVB Female Artiste
2013	The Hippocratic Crush II	Amber Ling Kwan	Supporting Role; Nominated — TVB Anniversary Award for Most Improved Female Artiste; Nominated — TVB Star Award Malaysia for Most Promising TVB Female Artiste
2013	Bounty Lady	Yam Mo-lin	Ep. 6–7, 20; Nominated — TVB Anniversary Award for Most Improved Female Artiste
2013–14	Return of the Silver Tongue	Suen Chor-chor	Supporting Role
2014	Tiger Cubs II	Laurine Shu Tsz-lai	Ep. 4
2014	Come On, Cousin	young Barbara	Guest Appearance
2015	Limelight Years	Lydia Nam Ting-nga	Guest Appearance
2015	Lord of Shanghai	Chor Ting-ting	Supporting Role
2016	Short End of the Stick	Kam Tai-tai	Major Supporting Role
2016	A Fist Within Four Walls	Fa Man	Main Role; Won — TVB Anniversary Award for Most Popular Female Character; Nominated — TVB Anniversary Award for Best Supporting Actress; Won — TVB Star Award Malaysia for Top 15 Favourite TVB Drama Characters; Nominated — TVB Star Award Malaysia for Favourite TVB Supporting Actress (Top 3); Nominated — TVB Star Award Malaysia for Favourite TVB Onscreen Couple (Top 3; with Benjamin Yuen); Won — StarHub TVB Award for My Favourite TVB Female TV Characters; Nominated — StarHub TVB Award for My Favourite TVB Supporting Actress; Won — StarHub TVB Award for My Favourite TVB Onscreen Couple (shared with Yuen); Nominated — People's Choice Television Award for Best Supporting Actress (Top 5); Nominated — People's Choice Television Award for Most Improved Female Artiste (Top 5)
2017	My Dearly Sinful Mind	Wong Hoi-ching	Main Role; Nominated — TVB Anniversary Award for Most Popular Female Character; Nominated — TVB Star Award Malaysia for Favourite TVB Actress; Nominated — TVB Star Award Malaysia for Top 17 Favourite TVB Drama Characters; Nominated — People's Choice Television Award for Best Supporting Actress (Top 5)
2017	A General, a Scholar and a Eunuch	Sandy Wong Yi-san / Crown Princess Kwok Sin	Main Role; Nominated — TVB Anniversary Award for Best Actress; Nominated — StarHub TVB Award for My Favourite TVB Actress; Nominated — StarHub TVB Award for My Favourite TVB Female TV Characters; Nominated — StarHub TVB Award for My Favourite TVB Onscreen Couple (with Raymond Cho)
2017	Come with Me	Emma Chung Ying-man / Dan-dan	Major Supporting Role; Role of two identical twin sisters
2018	OMG, Your Honour	Ophelia Mok Hei-loi	Main Role; Nominated — TVB Anniversary Award for Best Actress; Nominated — TVB Anniversary Award for Most Popular Female Character (Top 5); Nominated — TVB Anniversary Award for Favourite TVB Actress in Singapore; Nominated — TVB Anniversary Award for Favourite TVB Actress in Malaysia
2019	The Defected	Yeung Hiu-yee	Main Role; Nominated — TVB Anniversary Award for Best Actress; Nominated — TVB Anniversary Award for Most Popular Female Character
2021	The Forgotten Day	Freeya Yau Fei-yee	Main Role; Nominated — TVB Anniversary Award for Best Actress; Nominated — TVB Anniversary Award for Favourite TVB Actress in Malaysia
2021	The Kwoks And What	Chong Chi-ching	Main Role; Nominated — TVB Anniversary Award for Best Actress; Nominated — TVB Anniversary Award for Most Popular Female Character; Nominated — TVB Anniversary Award for Favourite TVB Actress in Malaysia
2022	The Righteous Fists	Ching On-na / Lo Kin-suet	Main Role
2022	I’ve Got The Power	Wai Sui-kei	Major Supporting Role
2024	Expats	Priscilla	Guest Role

=== Film ===
- From Vegas to Macau III (2016) – Interpol police.
- Line Walker (2016) – CIB detective.
- The Beauty (2016)
- Line Walker 2 (2019)
- Sakra (2023) – Kang Min.

=== Discography ===
- "她最好" – Ghost Dragon of Cold Mountain
- "Casada"

== Footnote ==
Preceded by Janet Chow	Miss Hong Kong Pageant 1st Runner-up; 2007	Succeeded by Skye Chan
Preceded by Janet Chow	Miss Hong Kong Pageant – Miss Photogenic Award; 2007	Succeeded by Sire Ma
