= Samantha Ko =

Hong Kong actress (born 1987)

- 高海寧
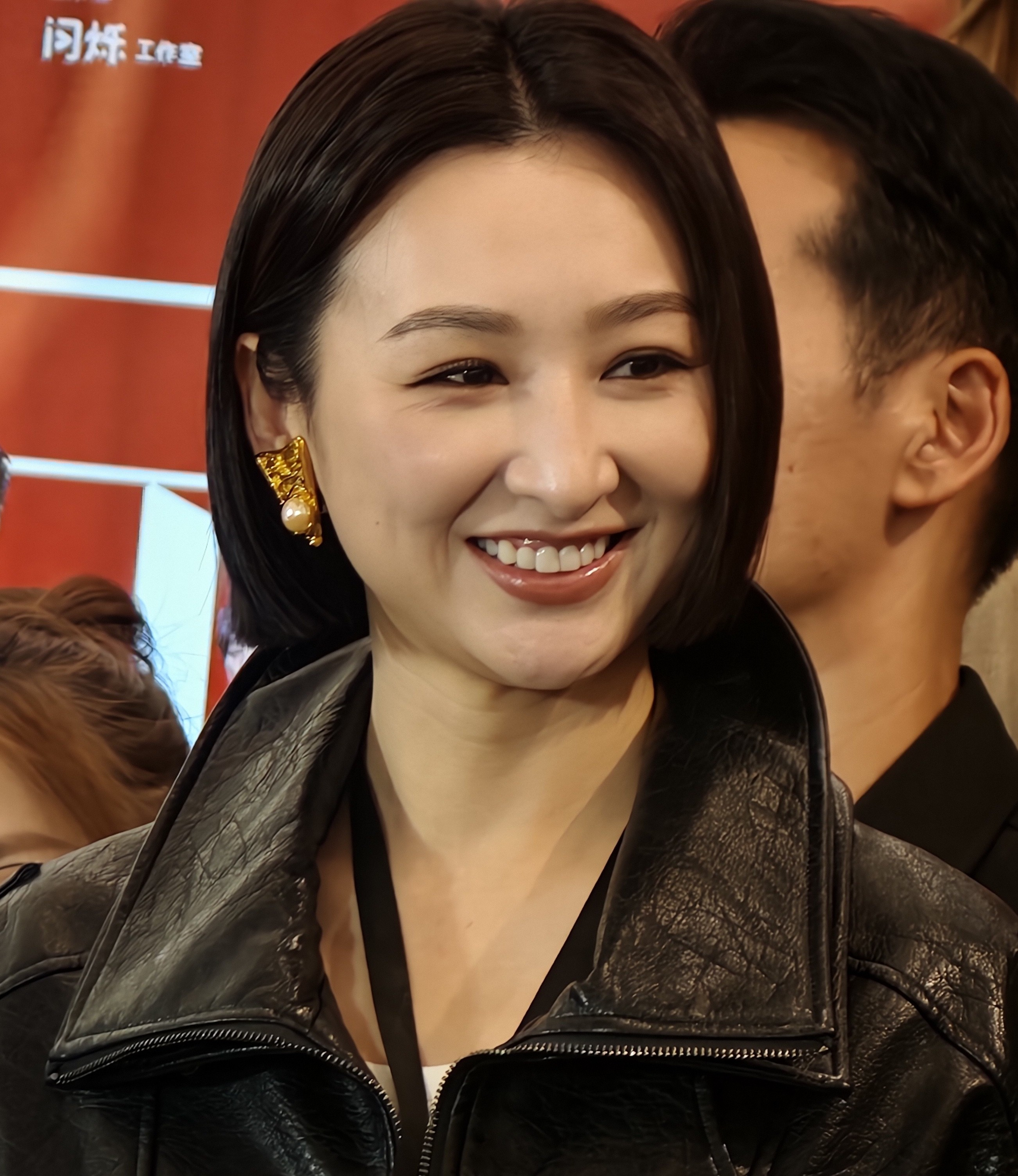
- Ko in November 2025
- Born: Shen Jiangli (沈江莉); 13 January 1987 (age 39); Nanjing, China
- Citizenship: Chinese (Hong Kong)
- Education: The Hong Kong Polytechnic University (PolyU)
- Occupation: Actress
- Years active: 2009–present
- Relatives: 2 younger brothers
- Awards: TVB Anniversary Awards – Best Supporting Actress; 2023 The QUEEN of News

Chinese name
- Traditional Chinese: 高海寧
Transcriptions
Standard Mandarin
- Hanyu Pinyin: Gāo Hǎiníng
Yue: Cantonese
- Jyutping: Gou^{1} Hoi^{2} Ning^{4}

Samantha Ko Hoi-ling (Chinese: 高海寧; born 13 January 1987) is a Hong Kong actress and model. She was a contestant in Miss Hong Kong 2008, placing in the top 5.

== Background ==
=== Early life ===
Ko was born in Nanjing, Jiangsu Province. Her ancestral home is Chaozhou, Guangdong Province. Ko immigrated to Hong Kong when she was thirteen. When she was a child, she took her grandmother's surname when she lived in mainland China. Later, she came to Hong Kong and lived with her parents and two younger brothers in a rooftop unit in a building in Tung Choi Street, Mong Kok, Kowloon. At the age of 18, she changed her name from "Shen Jiangli" to "Ko Hoi-ling". She graduated from Nanjing Shuangqiaomen Central Primary School (now Nanjing Qinhuai Experimental Primary School) (1999). After immigrating to Hong Kong, she attended SKH St. Mary's Church Mok Hing Yiu College (2005, Secondary 5). She also obtained 22 points in the Hong Kong Certificate of Education Examination.

=== Entering the industry and performing arts development ===
Ko was a model under "Elite Model Management Hong Kong", later she was encouraged by her parents to participate in the "2008 Miss Hong Kong Pageant", where she successfully entered the finals and won the "Tourism Ambassador Award". She was later accepted by TVB as a contract artist and also attended events as a Miss Hong Kong representative.

In 2023, Ko continued to endorse the beauty center, marking her 12th year as the brand spokesperson. In November of the same year, Ko played the role of news anchor "Kathy Hui Sze-ching" in the TVB anniversary drama The Queen of News, and her acting skills were recognized by netizens. She also won the "Best Supporting Actress" at the TVB Awards Presentation 2023 for this drama.

=== Event ===
In February 2024, Lionel Messi went to Hong Kong to attend the Inter Miami vs. Hong Kong Team match, but did not play in person. When Ko was interviewed, she said that she could understand and forgive Messi's absence due to injury, which attracted criticism from netizens. She later apologized for her previous statement on the social platform and said that she would continue to pay attention to the incident and hoped that the incident could be reasonably explained.

== Personal life ==
Ko's ex-boyfriend is former TVB music director Tang Chi Wai, who now runs his own music label. Although she rarely makes public appearances or posts photos with him, they were already a semi-public couple. However, the two later parted peacefully. In addition, she said that she was born with a tendency to gain weight and edema, and she relied on hot yoga to keep her figure in shape.

Ko's blood type belongs to the Rh negative, which is also known as "panda blood". Only 0.7% of people in Hong Kong have this blood type. As a result, she has been contacted by the Hong Kong Red Cross by phone and asked to donate blood as soon as possible.

== Filmography ==
=== Television dramas ===
Year	Title	Role	Notes/Ref.
2010	Some Day	Chou Mei-mei	Cameo
2010	Ghost Writer	Nine-tailed fox	Supporting Role
2010	Every Move You Make	Annie Leung Sze-man	Ep. 1-2
2011	Forensic Heroes III	Tracy Lam Yuen-yuen	Cameo
2012	Daddy Good Deeds	Ho Mei-yee	Cameo
2012	Gloves Come Off	Daisy	Introduced in Ep. 5
2012	Three Kingdoms RPG	Annie Leung Sze-man	Ep. 1
2012	The Last Steep Ascent	Keung Yim-ping	Supporting Role
2012–2013	Friendly Fire	KiKi Kei Mo-chi	Supporting Role
2013	Will Power	Elly Yip Nga-lai	Ep. 13-15
2013	Bounty Lady	Sing Fa-yui (Mika S. / Yui Yui)	Major Supporting Role
2014	Outbound Love	Wong Kei-ying	Major Supporting Role
2014	Line Walker	Lam Hei-mei	Supporting Role
2014	All That Is Bitter Is Sweet	Pin Pin	Supporting Role
2014	Come Home Love	Lovely Ling Lei	Supporting Role
2015	Eye in the Sky	Agatha Lam Ling	Major Supporting Role
2016	Love as a Predatory Affair	Hestia Ko Kwai-fun	Main Role
2017	My Unfair Lady	Tin Mut	Major Supporting Role
2017	Bet Hur	Ching Siu-buk	Major Supporting Role
2018	Flying Tiger	Jomine Fok Wai-wan	Supporting Role
2018	Who Wants A Baby	Katrina Hui Ching	Major Supporting Role
2019	My Commissioned Lover	Kimchi Pui King-chi	Main Role
2020	Death By Zero	Lam Sum-sum	Major Supporting Role
2020	On-Lie Game	Vincy Cheung Wai	Main Role
2020	Nothing But Thirty	Zhao Jingyu	Guest Appearance
2020	Al Cappuccino	Angel Chong Ming-lai	Main Role
2020	Go! Go! Go! Operation C9	Yu Siu-kiu (C9 / Cute Ma)	Main Role
2020	The Impossible 3		Guest Appearance
2021	Battle Of The Seven Sisters	Koo Ching-tung	Main Role
2022	Childhood In A Capsule	Amanda Lui chi-tung	Main Role
2023	The Queen of News	Cathy Hui Sze-ching	Major Supporting Role
2024	The Airport Diary	Lui Tsz-shan	Main Role
2025	The Queen of News 2	Cathy Hui Sze-ching	
TBA	夫妻的博弈	姜幸如	Main Role
TBA	璀璨之城	洪海允	Main Role
TBA	Wulin (武林)	單單單 (Single姐)	

=== Variety shows ===
- 2024 Memories Beyond Horizon: Season 2 (Youku/TVB)
- 2024 Because We Are Friends: Season 2 (因為是朋友呀2, Douyin/Emperor Motion Pictures)

=== Films ===
- 72 Tenants of Prosperity (2010)
- Perfect Wedding (2010)
- Beauty on Duty! (2010)
- I Love Hong Kong (2011)
- Delete My Love (2014)
- From Vegas to Macau II (2015)
- Never Too Late (2017)
- The Sexy Guys (2019)
