= Bounty Lady =

Hong Kong drama television series

- Official poster
- My盛Lady
- Genre: Comedy; Drama
- Created by: Jazz Boon
- Starring: Dayo Wong; Kate Tsui; Sharon Chan; Louis Yuen; Benz Hui; Elena Kong; Grace Wong; Toby Leung; Sammy Sum; Samantha Ko; Lam Tsz-sin
- Theme music composer: Fong Ho Man
- Opening theme: Bounty Lady (My盛Lady) by Dayo Wong
- Ending theme: 想一天 by Sharon Chan
- Composer: Tang Chi Wai
- Country of origin: Hong Kong
- Original language: Cantonese
- No. of seasons: 1
- No. of episodes: 20

Production
- Producer: Man Wai Hung
- Production location: Hong Kong
- Camera setup: Multi camera
- Running time: 45 minutes (each)
- Production company: TVB

Original release
- Network: TVB Jade
- Release: 25 November – 20 December 2013

Bounty Lady
- Chinese: My盛Lady
- Literal meaning: "my flourishing lady"
Transcriptions
Standard Mandarin
- Hanyu Pinyin: My Shèng Lady
Yue: Cantonese
- Yale Romanization: My Sìng Lady
- Jyutping: My Sing4 Lady

Bounty Lady (Chinese: My盛Lady; Cantonese Yale: My Sìng Lady) is a 2013 Hong Kong modern comedy-drama produced by TVB and starring Dayo Wong and Kate Tsui, with Sharon Chan, Louis Yuen, Benz Hui, Elena Kong, Grace Wong, Toby Leung, Sammy Sum, Samantha Ko and Lam Tsz-sin as the major supporting cast.

== Synopsis ==
Public Relation expert Heung Kwong-Nam (pun, meaning "Hong Kong men") is a renowned saviour to the single ladies in town. He is able to help many single female clients find a happy marriage by building confidence. Without charging money, he is able to find purpose in helping these women find love and themselves.

Newly joined Account Officer Sing Fa-Lui (pun, meaning "unmarried woman") is hired by Mak Dik-Man as Kwong-Nam's rival. At first, she is an overly-confident girl that sees Kwong-Nam and his group (Super Senior) as lazy and good-for-nothing. But she eventually grows to see the good in Kwong-Nam and his methods and they end up falling love.

== Plot summary ==
Episode 1-4: Kwong-Nam is hired by Ha-Tim to help his daughter, Judy, find a good husband. Judy is a princess - rich, well-educated, and loyal but also overbearing and overweight. At the same time, Fa-Lui is also hired by Dik-Man to help Judy find a husband. Both attempt to help Judy lose weight in order to find herself a good husband but Fa-Lui's dieting tactics causes Judy to become hospitalized. Ha-Tim fires her but continues to work with Kwong-Nam. Judy finds a suitable man at a speed-dating encounter set up by Kwong-Nam and Joe becomes her ultimate target to losing weight. However, Joe only sees Judy as a potential real-estate client. He admits Judy is not a typical HK-like girl, being sweet and kind, but still overweight. Kwong-Nam helps Judy realize she has changed from the typical HK girl to a nice and lovable girl. At this time, he also opens her eyes to her secret-admirer, Ho Gar-Jun.

Episode 6-7: Yam Mo-Lin is a tough female cop and devoted fan of Windy, completely following her ideology of living a single "full" life. Kwong-Nam runs into Mo-Lin at a lounge, playing drinking games. Intoxicated, Mo-Lin accidentally spills her secret admiration for a fellow co-worker at the police station, Wong Lung; however, Wong Lung always seems to treat Mo-Lin as one of the guys. So, Kwong-Nam decides to help Mo-Lin attract the man she loves, whilst breaking Mo-Lin away from Windy's ridiculous concept of a feminist society. Kwong-Nam is also able to attain help from Fa-Lui for this case because Fa-Lui has a bone to pick with Windy as well. After multiple attempts, Wong Lung still rejects Mo-Lin and Mo-Lin is about ready to give up on love. At Windy's meet-and-greet, Windy urges Mo-Lin to announce her new single life to the world but Kwong-Nam appears, convincing her to admit that she does still love Wong Lung. With Kwong-Nam's setup, all of Mo-Lin's lady-lessons were recorded and Wong Lung was able to witness it all at a private theater, with Mo-Lin. He sees her diligence and persistence on screen but also admits that he likes her the way she was before the lady lessons.

Episode 8-10: Fa-Lui's mother, Lee Chiu-Ling, has always taught her daughters that the ultimate goal is to marry a rich man. However, Fa-Lui's younger sister, Sing Fa-Yui, has always been a ditsy airhead so Fa-Lui puts it on herself to look after her younger sister. In order to help her find a rich man, Fa-Lui sets up an interview for Fa-Yui to be an advertising model for their next client, media tycoon Ma Ming. Due to his clean public image, Fa-Lui marks Ma Ming as a good match for Fa-Yui, hence providing more encounters for Fa-Yui to be close to Ma Ming. However, Kwong-Nam discovers that Ma Ming is a fake and his true purpose for hiring Fa-Yui is to deflower this pure and innocent girl. Kwong-Nam is torn between his professionalism to his company's client and his hatred for Ma Ming's dirty schemes. Meanwhile, Fa-Yui realizes that she does not care about marrying a rich man because her heart was already stolen by her childhood sweetheart, Pak-Kin. Pak-Kin grew up with Fa-Yui and has always had a crush on her. He was willing to give up his lazy and carefree life to work multiple jobs to win Fa-Yui's family over. Kwong-Nam also shows Fa-Lui Ma Ming's true colors and that Fa-Yui and Pak-Kin are the perfect matches together. Fa-Yui makes Pak-Kin want to be a better person and Pak-Kin really cares for Fa-Yui.

== Cast ==
=== Heung Family ===
Cast	Role	Description
Benz Hui	Heung Sin Nam 香善男	Heung Kwong Nam's older brother Super Senior member Yuen Sum's rival, later boyfriend and then husband
Dayo Wong	Heung Kwong Nam 香廣男	Heung Sin Nam's younger brother Super Senior member Sing Fa Lui's rival, later boyfriend and then husband Yuen Huen's ex-admirer Law Na possessive ex-admirer

=== Sing Family ===
Cast	Role	Description
Rosanne Lui	Lee Chiu Ling 李昭玲	Sing Fa Ngok, Sing Fa Lui, Sing Fa Yui’s mother
Tracy Ip	Sing Fa Ngok 葉翠翠	Lee Chiu Ling’s daughter Sing Fa Lui, Sing Fa Yui’s elder sister
Kate Tsui	Jennifer Sing Fa Lui 盛花蕾	Lee Chiu Ling’s daughter Sing Fa Ngok’s younger sister Sing Fa Yui’s elder sister Yuen Heun’s best friend Heung Kwong Nam's rival, later girlfriend and then wife
Samantha Ko	Sing Fa Yui 盛花蕊	Part-time model Lee Chiu Ling’s Daughter; Sing Fa Ngok, Sing Fa Lui younger sister Naive and innocent (Ep 8-10 makeover); Lau Pak Kin's childhood friend, later girlfriend and then wife

=== Yuen Family ===
Cast	Role	Description
Elena Kong	Windy Yuen Sum 袁琛	Author; Yuen Huen’s aunt Heung Sin Nam's rival, later girlfriend and then wife
Sharon Chan	Yuen Huen 袁萱	Yuen Sum’s niece Tung Ting Kiu's girlfriend and then wife Sing Fa Lui's best friend Had a crush on Kwang Nam

=== Tung Family ===
Cast	Role	Description
Lily Leung	Vivian	Tung Ting Kiu grandmother
Louis Yuen	Tung Ting Kiu 董天驕	Super Senior member Yuen Huen’s boyfriend and then husband

=== Other cast ===
Cast	Role	Description
May Chan	Judy	Episode 1-4; Overweight girl character
Grace Wong	Yam Mo Lin 任慕蓮	Episode 6-7; Tomboyish character, Wong Lung's colleague, admirer, later girlfriend, then wife
Ho Kwan Shing	Wong Lung 黃龍	Episode 6-7; Yam Mo Lin's colleague, crush, later boyfriend and then husband
Sammy Sum	Lau Pak Kin 劉柏堅	Sing Fa Yui's childhood friend, later boyfriend and then husband
Bob Lam	Ma Ming 馬明	Episode 8-10; Media tycoon. Public image is of gentlemen and all around nice guy. Really a playboy, scoundrel and pervert.
Toby Leung	Paula Lam Suk Wah 林淑樺	Bat Fan Keung's girlfriend and then wife
Jazz Lam	Bat Fan Keung 畢奮強	Super Senior member Paula's boyfriend and then husband
Harriet Yeung	Laura Law Na	Heung Kwong Nam's possessive ex-admirer

== Awards and nominations ==
TVB Anniversary Awards 2013

- Won - Best Actor (Dayo Wong)
- Won - Best Supporting Actor (Benz Hui)
- Nominated - My Favourite Male Character (Dayo Wong)
- Nominated - Best Actress (Top 5) (Kate Tsui)
- Nominated - My Favourite Female Character (Kate Tsui)

== Viewership Ratings & Reception ==
In total, Bounty Lady received 111 complaints, 35 were on Kate Tsui's little screentime, 37 complaints on Sharon Chan's poor acting and singing skills, too much screentime and inappropriate dressing. The final episode received 13 complaints about their poor editing. The drama also received complaints on draggy plot, misleading, degrades men/women, had too many advertisements and too much sex appeal, a bad influence on children. There were also 5 compliments on Kate Tsui and Sharon Chan's acting respectively.

Week	Episodes	Date	Average Points	Peaking Points
1	01－05	November 25-November 29, 2013	28	31
2	06-10	December 2-December 6, 2013	28	31
3	11-15	December 9-December 13, 2013	29	30
4	16-20	December 17- December 20, 2013	28	30
