= Slow Boat Home =

Hong Kong television series

- Promo poster
- 情越海岸線
- Genre: Romantic comedy Drama
- Created by: Leung Choi-yuen
- Written by: Ng Siu-tung
- Starring: Raymond Wong Ho-yin; Ruco Chan; Aimee Chan; Matt Yeung; Selena Lee; Cilla Kung; Elaine Yiu; Ngok Wah; Ram Chiang; Susan Tse; Angelina Lo; KK Cheung
- Theme music composer: Cousin Fung
- Opening theme: "還想" (Still Want) by Kay Tse
- Country of origin: Hong Kong
- Original language: Cantonese
- No. of episodes: 25

Production
- Executive producer: Leung Choi-yuen
- Camera setup: Multi camera
- Running time: 45 minutes
- Production company: TVB

Original release
- Network: TVB Jade; HD Jade
- Release: 13 May – 14 June 2013

Related
- Bullet Brain; Awfully Lawful; When Lanes Merge (2010)

Slow Boat Home
- Traditional Chinese: 情越海岸線
- Simplified Chinese: 情越海岸线
- Literal meaning: "Love Exceeds the Coastline"
Transcriptions
Standard Mandarin
- Hanyu Pinyin: Qíng Yuè Hai Àn Xiàn
Yue: Cantonese
- Jyutping: Cing4 Jyut6 Hoi2 On6 Sin3

Slow Boat Home (Chinese: 情越海岸線; literally "love exceeds the coastline") is a 2013 Hong Kong romantic comedy television drama produced by Leung Choi-yuen and TVB, starring Raymond Wong Ho-yin, Ruco Chan and Aimee Chan. The show was conceived in late 2011 by Leung, who aspired to write a youthful television drama for the aging TVB. Slow Boat Home was produced at 25 episodes, and the first episode premiered on TVB Jade on 13 May 2013.

The drama was primarily filmed in Cheung Chau.

== Premise ==
The serial delves into the lives and relationships of several high school classmates from Cheung Chau, a small island district in Hong Kong. Cheung Po-tsai (Raymond Wong Ho-yin), the 28-year-old son of a seafood restaurant owner, lives a seemingly aimless life that consists of stalking around the island and picking up fights with neighbors. He is, however, best friends with his polar opposite, Fit Wing (Ruco Chan), a hardworking medical intern in the city. While Cheung Po-tsai is struggling to gain his father's respect, Fit Wing is involved in an emotionally manipulative relationship with his high school sweetheart, Heidi (Selena Li).

== Main cast ==
- Raymond Wong Ho-yin as Cheung Po-seng (張寶生; jyutping: Zoeng Bousang), nicknamed "Cheung Po-tsai" (張保仔), the 28-year-old son of Cheung Shing-mui, the owner of a seafood restaurant in Cheung Chau. A college drop-out, Cheung Po-tsai lives in a seemingly aimless life which consists of picking up random harmless fights and causing trouble for his father. Nonetheless, Cheung Po-tsai is extremely loyal to his friends, compassionate, and holds high respect for his father, who struggled to raise his two children in a single-parent household.
- Ruco Chan as Kevin "Fit Wing" Ching (程禮榮; Cing Laiwing), Cheung Po-tsai's high school classmate and best friend. Unlike Cheung Po-tsai, Fit Wing is hardworking, polite, and well-mannered. He is a medical intern at a public hospital in the city, but considers resigning due to his disappointment with Hong Kong's public hospital system. He has been in love with his high school sweetheart Heidi, who broke up with him a year before he earned his medical degree. Fit Wing and Heidi get back together "four or five years" later, but the relationship is strained by Heidi's manipulation.
- Aimee Chan as Kate Cheng (鄭抱抱; Zeng Poupou), an American-born Chinese documentary director from New York. She arrives in Cheung Chau to film a documentary about the island, its culture, and its customs, but the movie almost never made it to the final cut when Cheung Po-tsai and his neighbors caused havoc and drove away Kate's film crew. Realizing his mistakes, Cheung Po-tsai decides to help Kate in finishing the documentary, and the two become close friends.

== Supporting cast ==
- Matt Yeung as Chan Moon-kei (陳滿基; Can Mungei), nicknamed "Shuttle Kei", Cheung Po-tsai and Fit Wing's high school classmate and best friend. Shuttle Kei is kind, compassionate, and prefers the slow and peaceful lifestyle of Cheung Chau rather than the city. Shuttle Kei has a crush on Cheung Po-tsai's younger sister YoYo, but is too shy to confess his feelings.
- Selena Li as Heidi Kwok (郭希雯; Gwok Heiman), Fit Wing's high school classmate and ex-girlfriend. An ambitious woman, Heidi is willing to sacrifice her love and family for her career. Seeing no benefits to her relationship with Fit Wing, she breaks up with him several times for businessman Vincent Chau, but Heidi always finds herself going back to him whenever she is lost. Although she truly loves Fit Wing, she does not hesitate to use him for her own gain, and their relationships turns from innocent to manipulative.
- Cilla Kung as YoYo Cheung (張文鳳; Zoeng Manfung), Cheung Po-tsai's younger sister. YoYo studies Chinese at a city college in Hong Kong, but desires to pursue a career in singing. Both Shuttle Kei and Crab vie for YoYo's affections.
- Elaine Yiu as So Fung-nei (蘇鳳妮; Sou Fungnei), a famous Taiwanese young adult novelist who falls in love with Fit Wing.
- Elliot Ngok as Cheung Shing-mui (張勝妹; Zoeng Singmui), Cheung Po-tsai and YoYo's father.
- Susan Tse as Ip Wing-shan (葉詠珊; Jip Wingsaan), Heidi's mother, who owns a vacation resort in Cheung Chau.
- Ram Chiang as Ip Hok-ming (葉學明; Jip Hokming), Shan's younger brother.
- Cheung Kwok-keung as Ching Yuk-biu (程煜標; Cing Jukbiu), Fit Wing's athletic father.
- Angelina Lo as Lau Miu-lin (劉妙蓮; Lau Miulin), Fit Wing's mother.
- Eric Li as Chu Yiu-kai (朱耀楷; Zyu Jiukaai), nicknamed Crab, Cheung Po-tsai's nemesis.
- Patrick Tang as Vincent Chau (周啟華; Zau Kaiwaa), a rich heir whose rich fiancé helps him in his business. He has an affair with Heidi. Also, this made Fit Wing decide to discontinue is work with medicine in the hospital in the city. He decides to go to Cheung Chau and become a family doctor.

== Viewership ratings ==
The following is a table that includes a list of the total ratings points based on television viewership. "Viewers in millions" refers to the number of people, derived from TVB Jade ratings (including TVB HD Jade), in Hong Kong who watched the episode live. The peak number of viewers are in brackets.

| Week | Episode(s) | Average points | Peaking points | Viewers (in millions) | Ref. |
|---|---|---|---|---|---|
| 1 | 1 — 5 | 25 | 28 | 1.61 (1.80) | |
| 2 | 6 — 10 | 26 | 28 | 1.67 (1.80) | |
| 3 | 11 — 15 | 26 | 30 | 1.67 (1.93) | |
| 4 | 16 — 20 | 26 | 28 | 1.67 (1.80) | |
| 5 | 21 — 25 | 28 | 30 | 1.80 (1.93) | |
