= The Day of Days (TV series) =

2013 Hong Kong TV drama series

- Official poster
- 初五啟市錄
- Genre: Period drama Comedy drama
- Written by: Chan Ching-yee
- Starring: Sunny Chan; Sonija Kwok; Raymond Wong Ho-yin; Rosina Lam; Matt Yeung; Patrick Tang; Mak Cheung-ching; Cilla Kung
- Theme music composer: Yip Siu-chung
- Opening theme: "The Inspiring Memo of a Fai-Chun" (揮春啓示錄) by FAMA
- Country of origin: Hong Kong
- Original language: Cantonese
- No. of episodes: 19 (Hong Kong airing; two hour finale); 20 (original version)

Production
- Producer: Leung Choi-yuen
- Production location: Hong Kong
- Camera setup: Multi camera
- Production company: TVB

Original release
- Network: TVB Jade
- Release: 21 January – 15 February 2013

The Day of Days
- The Day of Days intertitle
- Traditional Chinese: 初五啟市錄
- Simplified Chinese: 初五启市录
- Literal meaning: "Record of Fifth Day Opening"
Transcriptions
Standard Mandarin
- Hanyu Pinyin: Chū wǔ qǐ shì lù
Yue: Cantonese
- Jyutping: Cho1 Ng5 Kai2 Si5 Luk6

The Day of Days is a 2013 Hong Kong television period-drama serial produced by TVB under producer Leung Choi-yuen. The serial premiered on Monday, 21 January 2013 on Jade and HD Jade, and ran for 20 episodes.

== Synopsis ==
Simple and honest Sung Lai-wo (Sunny Chan) is a close relative to the Tong family – a noble clan of Xiguan. The gangster So Fei (Raymond Wong Ho-yin) deliberately flatters him in order to gain profits from the new dock run by Lai-wo; but Lai-wo is merely an idler of the Tong family, and the one at the helm is actually a pre-eminent businesswoman in Guangzhou and the eldest daughter of the Tong family – Tong Nga-wun (Sonija Kwok). She is not only very skillful in taking advantage of various situations, but also bold and resolute at work. However, she sacrifices her youth to take care of her family business, above which she has even spoiled her sister – Tong Nga-man (Lin Xiawei). Nga-man, with a rebellious temperament, deliberately fools around with So Fei so as to irritate Nga-wun. While the Tong family is leading a befuddled life, the valiant mayor of Guangzhou – Wong Kai-yiu (Law Lok-lam), is shot by accident, creating a furore among the city. Lai-wo is then appointed as the mayor of Guangzhou. Seizing the opportunity at the mayoral inauguration ceremony on the fifth day of the first lunar month, forces of evil and people from all circles that have been dormant for a while turn out in full strength to wreak havoc.

== Cast and characters ==
=== Main cast ===
- Sunny Chan as Sung Lai-wo (宋禮和) – a blood-unrelated member of the Tong family. A movie buff, Lai-wo often spends long days watching films in the cinema. Lai-wo has excellent memory retaining and observation skills.
- Sonija Kwok as Tong Nga-wun (唐雅媛) – the intelligent eldest daughter of the Tong family, a socially prominent family living in the wealthy Xiguan district of Guangzhou. She is the chairman of her family's business, Yip Wo Hong.
- Raymond Wong Ho-yin as So Fei (蘇飛) – the has-been leader of a has-been gang in Guangzhou.
- Rosina Lam as Tong Nga-man (唐雅文) – Nga-wun's younger sister.
- Mat Yeung as Wong Tsan-bong (汪振邦) – a minister of the Guangzhou government.

=== Supporting cast ===
- Tracy Ip as Ng Mei-fung (吳美鳳) – a con artist.
- Eric Li as Man Chi-mo (文志摩) – a spy.
- Cheung Kwok-keung as Tong Pak-nin (唐百年) – Nga-wun's uncle.
- Patrick Tang as Tong Shiu-yip (唐紹業) – Pak-nin's son, and the only male heir of the Tong family.
- Ching Hor-wai as Tong Yuk-hing (唐玉卿) – Pak-nin's older sister.
- Cilla Kung as So Fun (蘇芬) – the younger sister of So Fei.
- Mimi Chu as Mak Tai-ching (麥大青) – So Fei and So Fun's mother.
- Helen Ma as Wong Mei-ling (汪美玲)
- Law Lok-lam as Wong Kai-hiu (汪繼堯)

== Viewership ratings ==
Week	Episodes	Date	Average Points	Peaking Points
1	01－05	21–25 January 2013	25	28
2	06－10	28 January – 1 February 2013	25	
3	11－15	4–8 February 2013	24	
4	16－20	11–15 February 2013	24	29

== Production ==
An internal costume fitting was held on 6 September 2012 at TVB City The blessing ceremony was held on 21 September 2012 at Tseung Kwan O TVB City.
