= Sniper Standoff =

Hong Kong television series

- Promo poster
- 神鎗狙擊
- Genre: Crime thriller Action
- Screenplay by: Ng Lap-kwong; Wong Siu-lung; Cheng Chung-tai; Au Yin-woon; Wan kam-fung Yau Fuk-hing; Mok Chi-kai; Leung Sze-wan; Wong Kwok-fai
- Directed by: Koon Kwok-wai; Lee Kin-wo; Lee Man-sun; Hui Sui-ping
- Starring: Eddie Cheung; Michael Tse; Kathy Chow; Kate Tsui; Eliza Sam; Joseph Lee; Alice Chan
- Theme music composer: Yip Siu-chung
- Opening theme: Life of Attack (狙擊人生) by Michael Tse
- Country of origin: Hong Kong
- Original language: Cantonese
- No. of episodes: 25

Production
- Producer: Kwan Wing-chung
- Production location: Hong Kong
- Camera setup: Multi camera
- Production company: TVB

Original release
- Network: TVB Jade
- Release: 9 September – 11 October 2013

Sniper Standoff
- Title screen
- Traditional Chinese: 神鎗狙擊
- Simplified Chinese: 神枪狙击
- Literal meaning: "Sniper Attack"
Transcriptions
Standard Mandarin
- Hanyu Pinyin: Shén Qiāng Jū Jī
Yue: Cantonese
- Jyutping: San4 Ceong1 Zeoi1 Gik1

Sniper Standoff (Chinese: "神鎗狙擊") is a 2013 Hong Kong action crime thriller television series produced by TVB and starring Eddie Cheung, Michael Tse, Kathy Chow, Kate Tsui, Eliza Sam and Alice Chan. A costume fitting ceremony was held on 6 December 2012 at Tseung Kwan O TVB City Studio One Common Room at 12:30 PM. The premiere episode debuted on 9 September 2013 on TVB Jade.

== Plot ==
Sniper Lee Ho-yeung (Michael Tse) left the Special Duties Unit as he failed in an operation, and since then he has gradually developed personal enmity towards his co-worker and good friend Ko Chun Kin (Eddie Cheung).

Ho-yeung becomes a yacht merchant and then becomes a president of a Firearms Association, colluding with organised crime syndicates on the sly. Taking advantage of the trust laid upon him by a detective of the Organised Crime and Triad Bureau, Sheung-koon Ming-chu (Kate Tsui), he has quite a grasp on police operations that raid on the crime syndicates. On top of that, with his girlfriend Lai Chan (Eliza Sam) being a member of the Special Duties Unit, Ho-yeung gains first-move advantage in all respects. On the flip side, Chun-kin has been kept in the dark for the whole time, until he finds there is something suspicious regarding the criminal’s modus operandi in several murder cases. Later on, owing to a money laundering case, Ho-yeung deliberately approaches Chun-kin’s good friend, Wong Yeuk-ling (Kathy Chow), who learns that Chun-kin was the sniper who shot her in the head many years ago. Without anyone noticing, a tense standoff between the brothers is about to unfold.

== Cast ==
=== Special Duties Unit (SDU) ===
- Ricky Lee as Leung Kwan-hung (梁君雄), Superintendent of the Special Duties Unit, Kong Cho-ngai and Ko Chun-kin's superior officer
- Vincent Lam as Kong Chi-ngai (江志毅), Senior Inspector of the SDU, and also Ko Chun-kin's superior officer and good friend.
- Eddie Cheung as Ko Chun-kin (高晉堅), nicknamed GoGo Sir, Station sergeant and sniper instructor of the SDU. During an operation in the past, he accidentally shot hostage Wong Yeuk-ling in the head. Chun-kin does his best to make it up to her and they later develop a romantic relationship. He is good friends with Lee Ho-yeung, who is like a brother to him and along with Ho-yeung, he is Sheung-koon Tin's apprentice, who is also a fatherly figure to Chun-kin.
- Eliza Sam as Lai Chan (黎珍), the only female member of the SDU who strives to become Hong Kong's first female sniper. She meets Lee Ho-yeung, whom she secretly admires, at the Firearms Association, and when Ho-yeung sees potential in Chan, he takes Chan as his disciple and teachers his sniping skills to her.
- William Chak as Lau Kwai (劉貴), nicknamed Tiger, a member of the SDU sniper team who idolizes Lee Ho-yeung.
- Steven Cheung as On Ah-chit (安亞哲), nicknamed Energy, a member of the SDU sniper team who develops a crush on Lai Chan.
- Otto Chan as Cheung Ching-yee (蔣正義), a member of the SDU assault team.
- Yeung Chiu-hoi as Pao Chi-chung (包子忠), a member of the SDU assault team.
- Alan Wan as Cheung Pei-yan (張彼仁), a member of the SDU assault team.
- Nathan Ngai as Lam Pak-wing (林伯榮), a member of the SDU assault team.
- Raymond Tsang as Yau Yiu-wai (邱耀威), a member of the SDU assault team.
- Lau Tin-lung as Chiu Yung (趙勇), a member of the SDU assault team.

=== Organised Crime and Triad Bureau (OCTB) ===
- Henry Lo as Koon Man-fu (管萬夫), Superintendent of the Organised Crime and Triad Bureau who initially doubted Ming-chu's abilities.
- Joseph Yeung as Tang Wai-leung (鄧偉樑), Chief Inspector of OCTB.
- Kate Tsui as Sheung-koon Ming-chu (上官明珠), Senior Inspector of OCTB who is well respected by her subordinates due to her work abilities and kind nature. She is the daughter of Sheung-koon Tin and grew up with his father's apprentices, Chun-kin and Ho-yeung, whom she views as her older brothers. Ever since as an adolescent, Ming-chu has had a crush on Chun-kin.
- Chan Wing-chun as Wat Chin-kei (屈展基), Ming-chu's subordinate.
- Rocky Cheng as Mo heung-tung (毛向南), Ming-chu's subordinate.
- Russell Cheung as Kwok Wai-lun (郭泰倫), Ming-chu's subordinate.
- Apple Chan as Pang Kei (彭棋), Ming-chu's subordinate who went undercover in Kei Tim Corporation where her identity was exposed and severely beaten as a result.

=== The Wong family ===
- Kathy Chow as Wong Yeuk-ling (王若玲), ex-girlfriend of Albert Yip, an accountant who was involved in a money laundering case. Yeuk-ling was held hostage by kidnappers after Yip and during the incident, Chun-kin accidentally shot Yeuk-ling in the head. Chun-kin does his best to make up to her by providing her a job at his brother's insurance company, and later investing in to a cafe with the help of Ho-yeung. Not knowing that Chun-kin was doing all this to make it up to her, she develops a relationship with him. Later, thugs that were after Yip came back after her and during an incident where her younger brother Chi-hong was shot by a hitman, she goes through a personality change and seeks help from Ho-yeung to teach her how to use guns to seek revenge.
- Miki Yeung as Wong Yeuk-sam (王若心), Yeuk-ling's younger sister. She was once kidnapped along with her sister by a casino owner in an attempt to blackmail Lee Ho-yeung. Eventually, she and her sister were rescued by Ho-yeung
- Leo Lee as Wong Chi-hong (王子康), Yeuk-ling and Yeuk-sam's younger brother who recently returned to Hong Kong from studying abroad. He was later shot and seriously injured by a hitman who was after Yeuk-ling.

=== The Ko family ===
- Suet Nei as Law Oi-yau (羅愛友), Ko Chun-sek and Ko Chun-kin's mother.
- Jimmy Au as Ko Chun-sek (高晉碩), Chun-kin's older brother who is an insurance manager and the main financial support of the family. He is married to Kwok Mei-kam and has a child, Ko Fai-ting.
- Kayi Cheung as Kwok Mei-kam (郭美金), Chun-sek's wife and Fai-ting's mother
- Eddie Cheung as Ko Chun-kin (高晉堅), see Special Duties Unit (SDU)
- Chan Wang-tat as Ko Fai-ting (高輝霆), Chun-sek and Mei-kam's son.

=== The Sheung-koon family ===
- Joseph Lee as Sheung-koon Tin (上官天), a former SDU sniper who is the well-respected mentor of Chun-kin and Ho-yeung and father of Ming-chu.
- Kate Tsui as Sheung-koon Ming-chu (上官明珠), see Organised Crime and Triad Unit (OCTB)

=== The Ting family ===
- Chun Wong as Ting Sheung-sin (丁上善), the president of Kei Tim Corporation and Lee Ho-yeung's employer. Sheung-yin plans to pass down his business to his son, Fung, instead of her daughter, Hau, who is much more competent. He later schemes with his son to expose his daughter's crime evidence to the police and Ho-yeung kidnaps him and his son.
- Alice Chan as Ting Hau (丁巧), the vice president of Kei Tim Corporation and gives her best to the company despite her father's favoritism of her younger brother instead. She colludes with her loyal right-hand man, Ho-yeung, for whom she has feelings.
- Jack Hui as Ting Fung (丁峰), Sheung-sin's son and Hau's younger brother who is rather useless and not serious. He later schemes with his father to expose his sister's crime evidence to the police and Ho-yeung kidnaps them.

=== Kei Tim Corporation ===
- Chun Wong as Ting Sheung-sin (丁上善), see The Ting family
- Alice Chan as Ting Hau (丁巧), see The Ting family
- Lily Ho as Chan Mo-chi (陳慕芝), Ting Hau's assistant who severely beats up Pang Kei when she realized she was a cop.
- Lee Wing-yee as Pauline, an employee of Kei Tim.
- Wu Chung-wai as Sophie, an employee of Kei Tim.
- Joey Law as Kong (崗), an employee of Kei Tim.

=== Other cast ===
- Michael Tse as Lee Ho-yeung (李浩陽), a former member of the SDU sniper team who was dismissed after he killed a suspect during an operation. He is good friends with Ko Chun-kin, who regards Ho-yeung as a superior marksman. Ho-yeung, who has an emulative personality, feels bitter towards Chun-kin when he testified neutral to their superior officers, indirectly causing Ho-yeung's dismissal from the police force. On the surface, Ho-yeung works as a yacht merchant and trainer at the Firearms Association, but in actuality, he works as a hitman for Ting Sheung-sin and Ting Hau, killing people he believes that cannot be punished by law. Ho-yeung engages in a battle of wits with Chun-kin when the latter suspects his involvement of recent murder cases.
- Ma Koon-tung as Cha Siu-po (查小寶), Ho-yeung's personal assistant who is an expert computer hacker.
- Joe Junior as Choi Man-sing (蔡萬承), supervisor of the Firearms Association.
- Andes Yue as Albert Yip (葉以博), Yeuk-ling's deceased boyfriend who was an accountant and was involved in a money laundering case.
- Eric Chung as KC Lau (劉國忠), a property developer who scammed Ting Fung, causing Kei Tim Corporation to lose money. He was later abducted by Ting Hau and Chan Mo-chi with the help of Ho-yeung.
- Brian Burrell as an Eastern European gang leader who schemed with Ting Hau to plant a bomb at the Hong Kong Convention and Exhibition Center and held several business tycoons hostage in an attempt to make up for the money loss from KC Lau's scam.
- Parkman Wong as Hung Kwok-choi (洪國才), head of an illegal bookmarking organisation and a triad leader who was entrusted to launder US$50 million, but the funds went missing.
- Stephen Ho as Eagle Eye (鷹眼), a hitman working under Hung Kwok-choi whose marksman skills proves to be a match to Lee Ho-yeung. He once shot and seriously injured Chi-hong while trying to kill Yeuk-ling.

== Viewership ratings ==
Week	Episodes	Date	Average Points	Peaking Points
1	01－05	September 9-September 13, 2013	25	27
2	06－10	September 16-September 20, 2013	24	26
3	11－15	September 23-September 27, 2013	26	29
4	16－20	September 30-October 4, 2013	26	28
5	21－25	October 7-October 11, 2013	27	29

== Awards and nominations ==
Award	Category	Recipient	Result	Top 5
TVB Awards Presentation 2013	Best Drama		Nominated	—
TVB Awards Presentation 2013	Best Actress	Kathy Chow	Nominated	—
TVB Awards Presentation 2013	Best Supporting Actress	Eliza Sam	Nominated	—
TVB Awards Presentation 2013	Most Improved Female Artist	Eliza Sam	Won	
