= A Change of Heart (TV series) =

Hong Kong television series

- Official poster
- 好心作怪
- Genre: Fantasy drama Mystery
- Starring: Michael Miu; Bosco Wong; Niki Chow; Joey Meng; Mandy Wong; Vincent Wong
- Opening theme: "心變" (Heart Change) by Niki Chow
- Ending theme: "最後祝福" (Last Blessing) by Bosco Wong
- Country of origin: Hong Kong
- Original language: Cantonese
- No. of episodes: 30

Production
- Executive producer: Nelson Cheung
- Editor: Leung Yan Tung & Pang Mei Fung
- Camera setup: Multi camera
- Running time: 45 minutes (each)
- Production company: TVB

Original release
- Network: TVB Jade, HD Jade
- Release: 3 June – 12 July 2013

A Change of Heart (Chinese: 好心作怪), is a Hong Kong television modern drama serial produced by Nelson Cheung, starring Michael Miu, Bosco Wong, Niki Chow, Joey Meng and Mandy Wong. It premiered on TVB Jade in Hong Kong on June 3, 2013.

== Story ==
The story primarily focuses on the karmic life between Siu-Kat Yuen (Niki Chow) and Chi Lik "Power" Fong (Michael Miu). Siu-Kat is a HK police officer and commander of her own investigative squad. A dutiful cop, she works hard to maintain order and justice, however, secretly, she's on a personal quest to find her mother's killer. Unfortunately, her journey would lead to many tragedies as well as revelations to the people around her and the unusual connections of her past, present, and future.

Siu-Kat's mother was once a showgirl that had fallen on hard times. Desperate for financial survival for both mother and daughter, she became a prostitute to survive; it was a life she wanted to leave and planned for a fresh start once she had enough saved. Unfortunately, she was robbed and was killed for her money; it left Siu-Kat an orphan and that anger and need for justice drove her to become a cop. The only clue she had was a man with a dragon shaped tattoo on his left arm running out from her apartment before her mother was killed. However, she was never able to resolve the case and continued her career as a cop.

Siu-Kat would eventually have a romantic relationship with Dr. Yat San Yiu (Bosco Wong), a cardiologist and loving boyfriend. As the two got closer, Yat-San wanted to marry Siu-Kat, but she always resisted due to her personal past history. However, she eventually told Yat-San of her past and he wanted to help her move forward with her life, but she only felt he was interfering in her personal matters. After learning that Yat-San also tragically lost his mother (drowning accident while attempting to save someone), she became more understanding and the two later reconciled over their differences and even agree to marry, but it wouldn't be so as Yat-San died after saving an old lady from falling roof tiles. He suffered a fractured skull and was proven to be brain dead, as his final wish, he was a registered organ donor and his heart would be given to one of the most powerful businessman in HK, Power.

Power is the ruthless CEO of Lik Chi Ko (LCK) Enterprises. He's a raging executive that uses his power to dominate and force people to bow to his will in order to realize his capitalistic ambitions. His greatest vision is to reclaim a series of old estates to re-develop those territories into the latest commercial zone as Sleepless City; unfortunately, he suffers from a heart condition that has been slowly eating away his health. His wife, Sin-Hang Tong (Joey Meng), is a trained nurse and has been managing his health as he continues to pursue his mega real estate ambition while tempering his stressing nature. Things would change after his encounter with Dr. Yiu.

Although Power was suffering from heart complications, he continues to be impatient, angry, and irritable to everyone around him, including the medical staff caring for him. After his original primary doctor died in an unfortunate accident, Dr. Yiu became his primary doctor and had a good temperament to manage Power and eventually earned his respect. As time passed, Power's health declined drastically and he was near death when he got news that they have a donor. Little did Power know that Dr. Yiu died earlier and that his heart would be transferred onto him. With a new heart and a second chance on life, Power returned to LCK with a new perspective on life.

Through a combination of a renewed chance for life and inheriting the goodness from Dr. Yiu's heart, Power began to show a change in personality. He's no longer as ruthless and unforgiving as he used to; he began to work in more social development-based causes and even treated his staff around him with a more pleasant attitude. He also inherited Dr. Yiu's taste for sweets and his sense of moral/ethical responsibilities. It was because of his change of heart that would become the prelude to many things, including atoning for his past.

While Siu-Kat was devastated over Dr. Yiu's death, she was surprised to meet her fiancé's younger twin brother, Yuet-San. Although they look and sound exactly alike, Yuet-San is the less responsible one. Yuet-San personally watched his mother drown because she tried to save someone; moral responsibility became a joke afterwards as it cost his mother's life. He became a wandering vagrant and developed less reputable skills such as con-artistry and bar tending. After Yat-San's death, Yuet-San wanted to do more for his surviving great aunt and unofficially replaced Yat-San; he moved into his brother's apartment and even lived with Yat-San's best friend and roommate, Dr. Sin Chi "Eason" Tong (Vincent Wong). Because of his brother's memory, both Siu-Kat and Eason would voice disappointment over Yuet-San's nonchalant irresponsible nature. Things would change dramatically for Yuet-San when Power decided to help him.

Perhaps out of a sense of life-debt to Dr. Yiu and/or a connection with Yuet-San, Power took notice of Yuet-San and helped him relieve all of his major debts and arranged him to work as a bartender at his night club. Over time, Power would learn to appreciate Yuet-San and had him promoted multiple times and fast-tracked him as his new right-hand man in his operations. However, all of Power's recent actions, along with Yuet-San, didn't sit well with Power's wife, Sin-Hang.

Sin-Hang is the elder half-sister to Eason. Eason's father made a selfish decision to abandon his previous family for the sake of greater financial gain with his new one, however, his actions would indirectly lead to many tragedies. Sin-Hang watched her mother die from illness (her father wouldn't see her mother in her final moments) and the fact her father chose Eason's family over hers made Sin-Hang into a resentful person. Although she had other relatives to help raise her, she was often abused; all of this negativity shaped Sin-Hang into the manipulative, ruthless, and spiteful woman that she is today. She loves Power greatly and would do anything for him, but she begins to distant herself from him as she couldn't stand Power's new sense of social and personal responsibility for his many years of wrongdoings.

After Power recovered from his heart condition, Sin-Hang developed a more powerful seat with the board at LCK Enterprises and she began to lust for more power. She originally teamed up with Martin (Benjamin Yuen), Power's original right-hand-man, to help Power maintain his CEO seat as well as help gather funds for the Sleepless City project; Power showed gradual disinterest in the project and focused more on philanthropy and dedicating funds to more social responsible causes, a series of disappointing decisions. Around that same time, Siu-Kat also developed an unusual friendship with Power as she was partially drawn to him because Dr. Yiu's heart lives through him. Their odd semi-friendship lead Sin-Hang to think she's not appreciated anymore and started an affair with Martin. Concurrently, Power assigned Yuet-San to go undercover for him to keep tabs on his wife's activities, however, that lead to misunderstands and negative feelings from his friends and family.

In between, Siu-Kat started to date Yuet-San; it was hard for her due to his resemblance to Yat-San. She later put their relationship on hold while investigating her mother's death. Secretly, Eason and Sai Kau Yip (her subordinate, god-father, and father to Wing-Yan) started to look into the case for her and later collaborated with her. At first, the trio had circumstantial evidence to suggest Power had something to do with Siu-Kat's mother's death due to the similar tattoo he had. Due to Siu-Kat's overzealous nature, she had Power arrested and he confessed that he stole money from her mother, but never killed her. By chance, a piece of jewelry from the crime scene was found and it linked to Sai-Kau's (Benz Hui) wife (Akina Hong) as the killer. Sai-Kau tried to help his wife escape, but Siu-Kat caught up to them and learned that Sai-Kau's wife stole money from Siu-Kat's mom, but she tried to stop her and accidentally pushed her to the floor, where she landed on top of a glass shard that killed her. The revelation was heartbreaking to Siu-Kat as she loved her God-father and his family; both Wing-Yan and Sai-Kau kneel and begged for mercy, but Mrs.Yip was ultimately arrested and sentenced for secondary degree manslaughter. Power was also jailed for a couple of months on the charges of robbery and assault.

Sin-Hang and Martin eventually put themselves in a difficult situation. In their quest to help Power attain more funds, they aligned themselves with a triad boss. The deal was that Sin-Hang would help use LCK Enterprises to help clean his dirty money in exchange for his resources to keep the Sleepless City project afloat, but things went awry when Power was released and realized what was happening; Power seized those assets and threatened the triad boss with the police to end their ties. The triad boss didn't take things well and decided to teach Power a lesson by slashing his wife's beautiful face, causing Sin-Hang to have a 4-inch (100 mm) scar on her face. To return a favor, Power had his agents attack the triad boss's house in Thailand and threatened to kill him and his family; Power ultimately had them released as he reasons his death would result in a vicious cycle of vengeance and reminded the importance of learning to let go of things.

Sin-Hang's life would continue to fall apart as her web of deception unraveled. Oppa, a cop under Siu-Kat was desperate for money and found incriminating evidence that Sin-Hang threw the tiles that killed Dr. Yiu; he blackmailed her for money. Things wouldn't go well for Oppa after Siu-Kat suspected him and he ran for it. He tried to blackmail more money out of Sin-Hang to escape, but the two ended up in a struggle when Eason came to try to save his sister; he ended up with a serious head injury. As Oppa was running, Siu-Kat caught up to him. He was then knocked down by a car while crossing a road, resulting in his death. Although she felt guilty for her brother, Sin-Hang pretended to show no remorse. She would later see her father as the two looked after Eason, but it was there she said some hateful words, enough to encourage his heart to fail and died, leaving Eason the only family member still alive.

Taking advantage of Sin-Hang's fragile mentality, Siu-Kat staged a fake supernatural event in the parking lot, by having Yuet-San put on a doctor's robe to resemble Yat-San, to fool her to think karmic forces are after her. In a confrontation with her weakened will, she revealed to Siu-Kat that it was she who threw the tiles that led to Dr. Yiu's death. Because she confessed with the police recording her, it was used as evidence on top of other alleged crimes and she was sent to jail for processing. However, not long after, the police that were transporting her through a rainy day lost control of their van and it slipped right into the sea and Sin-Hang's body was never recovered; she was presumed dead. With Sin-Hang gone and justice served for both her mother and Yat-San, Siu-Kat's quest for justice left her police record tarnished; since she fulfilled her goals, it was a non-regrettable outcome and she chose to leave the HKPD for some time off.

One year later, Eason has married Wing-Yan (the two always had feelings for each other throughout the story) and Yuet-San continues to wait for Siu-Kat's return. Not long after, the two found each other and Siu-Kat agreed to marry Yuet-san. Shortly after, Power received an unusual text from Siu-Kat, with her telling him she doesn't really want to marry Yuet-San, but wants to be with him. Siu-Kat then appears before Power, wanting him to answer about his feelings about her. Power admitted feeling something for her, but he explained he loves his wife very much and can't be with her. It was because of his love for Sin-Hang that Siu-Kat reveals she's really Sin-Hang. Through plastic surgery, she re-made herself a replica of Siu-Kat, believing this would please her husband; she was happy to know Power still loves her. She then reveals that she was planning to kill Power and commit suicide afterwards, but dropped the idea when she realises that she had misunderstood Power all this time. However, Sin-Hang complicated matters as she's still mentally/emotionally unstable and had kidnapped Siu-Kat earlier and hidden her inside a cargo container. However, with Yuet-San, Power, and Siu-Kat's police crew, they helped locate her. However, Sin-Hang died as she sacrificed herself to save Power from heavy-falling cargo.

Further time has passed and Power has since focused heavily on social work and his fate within LCK Enterprises is unknown. However, while working on a farm site with some children, he encountered a loving teacher that had a strong resemblance to his dead wife (also played by Joey Meng), suggesting he'll try to start a new life with her. Elsewhere, at the grand opening of the LCK Community Centre, Siu-kat and Yuet-San are now happily married. It was never revealed if she returned to HKPD, but she quietly says to Yat-San that she's in a better place.

== Cast and characters ==
- Michael Miu as Fong Chi Lik (方自力), nicknamed Power, the ruthless CEO of Lik Chi Ko Enterprises that suffers from coronary heart disease. He received the heart from Yat San, who died in an accident. He starts to change his personality to become a good person
- Bosco Wong as Yiu Yat San (姚日山), Power's cardiologist and Kat's boyfriend. Died in an accident; he is shown to be more serious than his twin brother. He is the narrator throughout the series.
- Bosco Wong as Yiu Yuet San (姚月山), nicknamed Hugo or Siu Yiu, Yiu Yat San's twin younger brother. Arrives in Hong Kong after his twin brother's death, he finds a position as bartender working for Power. Soon he wins Power's trust in many instances and rises in power. Develops a crush on Siu Kat and starts to date her.
- Niki Chow as Yuen Siu Kat (阮小吉), Yat San's fiancée. Police inspector in the Hong Kong Police Force, she is very determined to find the perpetrator of her mother's murder. Later marries Yuet San
- Joey Meng as Tong Sin Hang (唐善行), Power's wife, at odds with Siu Kat. Uses illegal methods to help Power and his company. She is the older half sister of Eason and is at odds with Eason and his family.
- Mandy Wong as Ha Sze Ka (夏思嘉), nicknamed Sze Ka Che (Private Car), used to work as a hostess in Night Shadow. Selfish con artist but later changes for the better. Develops a crush on Yuet San.
- Vincent Wong as Eason, Tong Sin Chi (唐善知), a cardiologist working in the same hospital as Yat San. Sin Hang's half brother. At first, develops a crush on Siu Kat and then on Yan. Later marries Yan
- Benz Hui as Yip Sai Kau (葉世九), Working as a CID, subordinate of Siu Kat. Wing's father.
- Benjamin Yuen as Martin, Ting Chun Ping (丁俊平), legal adviser at Lik Chi Ko. During Power's hospitalization he gains the trust of Power. As he becomes more influential in the company's operations, he becomes at odds with Yuet San, who is also gaining influence in Lik Chi Ko. He has an affair with Mrs. Fong.
- JJ Jia as Ngan Yat Fei (顏一菲), Martin's wife. She becomes pregnant but miscarries after she finds out about her husband's affair.
- Elaine Yiu as Yip Wing Yan (葉詠恩), nicknamed Yan, Kat's best friend, Kau's daughter, works as a social worker. Likes Eason, later married to him.
- Chan Wing Chun as KY Cheung (張國耀), nicknamed KY, business partner and shareholder of Lik Chi Ko Enterprises. He is an enemy of Fong Chi Lik and was tricked by him making him loose all his money and having to sell his shares to Fong Chi Lik. He had an underwear pushed into his mouth after always saying he and Fong Chi Lik shared one underwear.

== Viewership ratings ==
Week	Episodes	Date	Average Points	Peaking Points
1	01－05	June 3–7, 2013	24	26
2	06－10	June 10–14, 2013	27	29
3	11－15	June 17–21, 2013	27	29
4	16－20	June 24–28, 2013	27	
5	21－25	July 1–5, 2013	27	32
6	26－30	July 8–12, 2013	30	32
