= Awfully Lawful =

- Official poster
- Also known as: Confused Mature Men
- 熟男有惑]
- Genre: Comedy; Legal drama
- Written by: Cheung Wai-yu; Chan Kam-ling; Sin Suk-mui; Tang So-kuen; Yeung Chun-pak; Wong Ching-man; Tam Kim-wai
- Directed by: Lam Kin-cheung; Law Wai-chun; Chin Wing-chi; Yiu Tin-tong
- Starring: Roger Kwok; Johnson Lee; Raymond Cho; Sharon Chan; Selena Lee; Pal Sinn; Joyce Tang; Grace Wong
- Theme music composer: Jeffrey Yip
- Opening theme: Half-matured Men (半生熟男) by Roger Kwok, Raymond Cho, Pal Sinn, Johnson Lee
- Country of origin: Hong Kong
- Original language: Cantonese
- No. of episodes: 20

Production
- Producer: Lam Chi-wah
- Production location: Hong kong
- Camera setup: Multi camera
- Running time: 45 minutes
- Production company: TVB

Original release
- Network: Jade; HD Jade
- Release: 24 June – 9 August 2013

Awfully Lawful (Chinese: 熟男有惑) is a 2013 Hong Kong comedy legal drama television series produced by TVB. The series revolves around three lawyers, their legal cases and their personal relationships and it stars Roger Kwok, Johnson Lee, Raymond Cho, Sharon Chan and Selena Lee as the main cast.

== Synopsis ==
Ming (Raymond Cho) and Jazz (Pal Sinn) are partners of a solicitor firm, who invite Solo (Roger Kwok) and Fish (Johnson Lee) to join the firm as well. Despite their different personalities, the four men share a close bond. They are well-known within the legal circle as "The Big Four Mature Men". Their creative tactics to win court cases have won over many female clients. Unfortunately, someone has swindled money from the firm.

To save the firm from financial distress, four female lawyers are brought in. They include Roger's rival Kay (Sharon Chan), Johnson's wealthy wife Elsa (Selena Li), Ming's wife Tina (Joyce Tang) and a barrister, Honey (Grace Wong), who gets entangled with Pal and Johnson. The working and private relationships of the eight become messier and messier, until they finally realize that there is someone behind all the happenings at the law firm. With Solo leaving the firm and Ming's mysterious disappearance with the firm's money, what would become of the law firm?

Will the four women - Elsa, Kay, Tina, and Honey - be able to save the firm?

== Main cast ==
- Roger Kwok as Solo, whose father worked for Lady Lauren but he died while trying to rescue Harry from kidnappers. In appreciation of his sacrifice, Lady Lauren provided education for Solo. He primarily focuses on family and public work related cases at the firm, but suddenly leaves while it is in crisis. Solo hates being entangled in relationships and does not want to get married and have children. He is at odds with Kay.
- Sharon Chan as Kay, Tina's younger sister. Five years earlier, she had been in a relationship with Lady Lauren's son, Harry. She became pregnant with his child and believed that they would get married, but Harry had no intention of doing so and abandoned her. As a result, she left her son with Tina and Ming to go to England to find Harry.
- Johnson Lee as Fish, the husband of Elsa. He and his wife almost always argue over whether or not to have children - Elsa does not appreciate how Fish is always trying to force her into having a baby. The issue drives a deep wedge into their relationship, such that Elsa considers that he might be interested in other women and hires Betty to track Fish's activities. When they almost divorce, Fish apologizes and promises not to force Elsa to have babies.

== Recurring cast ==
- Pal Sinn as Jazz, Ming's partner at the law firm. His dream is to be a singer, but his ambitions fell through as he allegedly copied someone's music work and was charged. He likes Honey.
- Raymond Cho as Ming Sir, Jazz's at the law firm. He is married to Tina, with two sons, Felix and Louis. He took 30 million dollars away from the firm and the firm almost folded up.
- Joyce Tang as Tina, Ming's wife and Kay's older sister. When Kay left her infant son Felix with Tina and Ming, Tina prematurely gave birth to her own baby, Louis. To prevent Felix from being taken away, Tina and Ming said that Tina had given birth to twins and raised Felix as their own child alongside Louis. When she sees Ming appearing on television as he was cheering during the NBA tournament, she leaves Hong Kong for the United States.
- Selena Lee as Elsa, Fish's wealthy wife and Harry's sister. She does not want to have children, which is the source of many arguments with Fish, and would rather divorce her husband than be forced into having a child. She and Honey have mutually despised one another since high school, and Elsa becomes especially jealous when Honey tries to become close to Fish and seduce him.
- Grace Wong as Honey, a notable and famous attorney, as well as Solo's rival. She and Elsa have hated one another since high school. Though she seems to like Jazz, she deliberately provokes Elsa by seducing Fish.
- Helena Law as Lady Lauren, Elsa's and Harry's mother. Lady Lauren is the daughter of a British Earl and married into wealth. *Angel Chiang as Lady Lauren in her youth.
- Stephen Huynh as Harry, Lady Lauren's son. Harry had an affair with Kay and is oblivious to the existence of his five-year-old son, Felix.
- Bella Lam as Betty, Fish's secretary whom Elsa hires to spy on her husband. Betty wanted to quit her job and go to South Korea for plastic surgery but she got scammed and had to come back and work for Elsa again.
- Vin Choi as Hugo Kwai, a pupil barrister
- Celine Ma as Fanny
- Owen Cheung

== Viewership ratings ==
The following is a table that includes a list of the total ratings points based on television viewership. "Viewers in millions" refers to the number of people, derived from TVB Jade ratings (including TVB HD Jade), in Hong Kong who watched the episode live. The peak number of viewers are in brackets.

Week	Episode(s)	Average points	Peaking points	Viewers (in millions)	Ref.
1	1 — 5	26	30	1.67 (1.86)	50
2	6 — 10	26	31	1.67 (1.99)	40
3	11 — 15	26	40	1.67	
4	16 — 20	27	40	1.73	
