= TVB Anniversary Award for Best Drama =

Hong Kong television award

TV Anniversary Award for Best Drama
- Awarded for: "Best Drama Series of the Year"
- Country: Hong Kong
- Presented by: Television Broadcasts Limited (TVB)
- First award: 1997
- Currently held by: Get On A Flat (2022)
- Website: http://birthday.tvb.com/

The TVB Anniversary Award for Best Drama Series is one of the TVB Anniversary Awards presented annually by Television Broadcasts Limited (TVB) to producers who have created the most outstanding television drama series aired on the designated year. This award is usually reserved to be one of the last presented, and is considered to be one of the most premier awards of the ceremony.

The award has changed names several times since its institution in 1997. It was first called the Most Popular Television Programme of Hong Kong — Drama (全港最受歡迎電視節目—戲劇類) in 1997, but was changed to My Favourite Television Programme — Drama (我最喜愛的電視節目—戲劇節目) in 1998. The name was finally changed to Best Drama Series (最佳劇集) in 2005.

== Winners and nominees ==
The following is a list of the top 5 (or top 3, depending on the year) nominated drama series since 1997.

indicates the winner

=== 1990s ===
1997 (1st)
Title	Producer(s)	Story editor(s)
Actors
Old Time Buddy	Chung Shu-kai	Chiu Ching-yung
Francis Ng, Gallen Lo, Jessica Hsuan, Maggie Cheung Ho-yee
Detective Investigation Files III	Poon Ka-tak	Au Koon-ying, Ka Wai-nam
Michael Tao, Kenix Kwok, Joey Leung, Monica Chan
Journey to the West	Lau Sze-yu	Cheung Wah-biu, Ip Kwong-yam
Dicky Cheung, Kwong Wah, Wayne Lai, Mak Cheung-ching
Time Before Time	Yeung Kam-chuen	Cheung Wah-biu, Leung Kim-ho
Gordon Lam, Kathy Chow
A Kindred Spirit	Tsui Yu-on	Chan Po-wah, Lam Siu-chi
Louise Lee, Lau Dan, Nancy Sit, Kwan Hoi-san

1998 (2nd)
Title	Producer(s)	Story editor(s)
Actors
Healing Hands	Gary Tang	Gary Tang, Leung Man-wah
Lawrence Ng Kai-wah, Bowie Lam, Ada Choi, Flora Chan, William So, Steven Ma, Nick Cheung
Secret of the Heart	Jonathan Chik	Chow Yuk-ming, Alex Pao, Mak Chi-shing
Gallen Lo, Sunny Chan, Felix Wong, Kathy Chow, Amy Kwok, Ada Choi, Jessica Hsuan, Nick Cheung, Melissa Ng
Armed Reaction	Kwong Yip-sang	Lam Siu-chi, Kwan Chung-ling
Esther Kwan, Joyce Tang, Bobby Au-yeung, Marco Ngai
Rural Hero	Poon Ka-tak	Ka Wai-nam
Jackie Lui, Roger Kwok, Jessica Hsuan
A Recipe for the Heart	Tommy Leung	Au Koon-ying
Bobby Au-yeung, Esther Kwan, Lydia Shum, Paul Chun, Louis Koo, Jessica Hsuan, Maggie Cheung Ho-yee

== 2000s ==
2005 (9th)
Title	Producer(s)	Story editor(s)
Actors
Wars of In-Laws	Kwan Wing-chung	Choi Shuk-yin, Leung Yan-tung
Liza Wang, Myolie Wu, Bosco Wong, Shek Sau, Christine Ng
My Family	Amy Wong	Lam Siu-chi
Chung King-fai, Ha Yu, Rebecca Chan, Hawick Lau, Alex Fong, Shirley Yeung
Life Made Simple	Wong Wai-sing	Lau Choi-wan, Chan Kam-ling
Roger Kwok, Jessica Hsuan, Bosco Wong, Leila Tong

2006 (10th)
Title	Producer(s)	Story editor(s)
Actors
La Femme Desperado	Poon Ka-tak	Chu King-kei, Lau Choi-wan
Melissa Ng, Sheren Tang, Raymond Lam, Michael Tse, Kenneth Ma, Kate Tsui
The Dance of Passion	Jonathan Chik	Chow Yuk-ming
Bowie Lam, Moses Chan, Ada Choi, Gigi Lai, Charmaine Sheh, Maggie Shiu, Kenny Wong
Maidens' Vow	Chong Wai-kin	Choi Shuk-yin, Leung Yan-tung
Charmaine Sheh, Joe Ma

2007 (11th)
Title	Producer(s)	Story editor(s)
Actors
Heart of Greed	Lau Ka-ho	Cheung Wah-biu, Sit Ka-wah
Louise Lee, Ha Yu, Moses Chan, Bosco Wong, Susanna Kwan, Michelle Yim, Linda Chung, Tavia Yeung, Yoyo Mung
Dicey Business	Nelson Cheung	Susan Chan
Bobby Au-yeung, Michael Miu, Jessica Hsuan, Bosco Wong, Tavia Yeung
The Family Link	Lam Chi-wah	Lau Choi-wan
Sheren Tang, Cecilia Yip, Kiki Sheung, Michael Tse, Leila Tong, John Chiang

2008 (12th)
Title	Producer(s)	Story editor(s)
Actors
Moonlight Resonance	Lau Ka-ho	Cheung Wah-biu, Sit Ka-wah
Louise Lee, Ha Yu, Susanna Kwan, Michelle Yim, Lee Heung Kam, Moses Chan, Raymond Lam, Bosco Wong, Tavia Yeung, Linda Chung, Fala Chen, Kate Tsui, Wayne Lai
Best Selling Secrets	Catherine Tsang, Law Chun-ngok	Sandy Shaw, Wong Wai-keung
Esther Kwan, Elaine Jin, Elvina Kong
D.I.E.	Nelson Cheung	Wong Kwok-fai
Roger Kwok, Sonija Kwok, Kenneth Ma, Margie Tsang

2009 (13th)
Title	Producer(s)	Story editor(s)
Actors
Rosy Business	Lee Tim-sing	Cheung Wah-biu, Chan Ching-yee
Sheren Tang, Wayne Lai, Ron Ng, Elliot Ngok, Kiki Sheung, Susan Tse, Kara Hui
E.U.	Wong Wai-sing	Chu King-kei, Lee Yee-wah, Leung Yan-tung
Michael Miu, Kathy Chow, Ron Ng, Sammul Chan, Michael Tse, Elanne Kong
Burning Flame III	Amy Wong	Wong Yuk-tak, Ng Siu-tung
Kevin Cheng, Wong He, Bosco Wong, Myolie Wu
You're Hired	Nelson Cheung	Chu King-kei, Suen Ho-ho
Dayo Wong, Charmaine Sheh
Beyond the Realm of Conscience	Mui Siu-ching	Ka Wai-nam, Choi Ting-ting
Charmaine Sheh, Tavia Yeung, Moses Chan, Kevin Cheng, Michelle Yim, Susanna Kwan

== 2010s ==
2010 (14th)
Title	Producer(s)	Story editor(s)
Actors
Can't Buy Me Love	Mui Siu-ching	Kwan Chung-ling, Leung Man-wah
Charmaine Sheh, Moses Chan, Linda Chung, Raymond Wong Ho-yin, Fala Chen, Kenneth Ma, Susanna Kwan, Lee Heung-kam, Louis Yuen, Selena Li
A Chip Off the Old Block	Poon Ka-tak	Chan Kam-ling
Sunny Chan, Ron Ng, Myolie Wu, Shirley Yeung, John Chiang, Gigi Wong
The Mysteries of Love	Lau Ka-ho	Wong Yuk-tak, Leung Man-wah
Raymond Lam, Tavia Yeung, Kenneth Ma, Bernice Liu
Every Move You Make	Tsui Yu-on	Sit Ka-wah
Bowie Lam, Kristal Tin, Bosco Wong
No Regrets	Lee Tim-shing	Cheung Wah-biu, Chan Ching-yee
Sheren Tang, Wayne Lai, Raymond Wong Ho-yin, Fala Chen, Susan Tse, Elliot Ngok, Kara Hui, Ngo Ka-nin

2011 (15th)
Title	Producer(s)	Story editor(s)
Actors
Lives of Omission	Chong Wai-kin	Au Koon-ying, Choi Shuk-yin
Michael Tse, Bosco Wong, Fala Chen, Kate Tsui, Damian Lau, KK Cheung, Elena Kong, Ben Wong
Yes, Sir. Sorry, Sir!	Lau Ka-ho	Wong Yuk-tak, Leung Man-wah
Moses Chan, Tavia Yeung, Linda Chung, Ron Ng
Ghetto Justice	Terry Tong	Lau Choi-wan, Chan Kam-ling
Kevin Cheng, Myolie Wu, Sam Lee, Alex Lam, Joyce Tang, Sharon Chan, Shek Sau
The Other Truth	Amy Wong	Kwan Chung-ling
Tavia Yeung, Raymond Wong Ho-yin, Ruco Chan, Louis Yuen, Natalie Tong, Lai Lok-yi, Sam Chan, Li Shing-cheong
Forensic Heroes III	Mui Siu-ching	Choi Ting-ting, Leung Man-wah
Wayne Lai, Maggie Cheung Ho-yee, Kate Tsui, Ron Ng, Aimee Chan, Edwin Siu, Nancy Wu, Ruco Chan

2012 (16th)
Title	Producer(s)	Story editor(s)
Actors
When Heaven Burns	Jonathan Chik	Chow Yuk-ming
Bowie Lam, Moses Chan, Kenny Wong, Charmaine Sheh, Maggie Shiu, Elaine Jin
The Hippocratic Crush	Poon Ka Tak	Suen Ho-ho, Connie Pun, Leung Yan-tung
Kenneth Ma, Tavia Yeung, Him Law, Mandy Wong, Benjamin Yuen, Candy Chang, Derek Kok, Paisley Wu, Gigi Wong, Ben Wong
The Confidant	Marco Law	Kwan Chung-ling
Wayne Lai, Michelle Yim, Maggie Shiu, Raymond Wong Ho-yin, Aimee Chan, Raymond Cho, Nancy Wu, Natalie Tong, Power Chan, Edwin Siu

2013 (17th)
Title	Producer(s)	Story editor(s)
Actors
Triumph in the Skies II	Au Koon-ying, Joe Chan	Au Koon-ying, Lo Mei-wan
Francis Ng, Julian Cheung, Myolie Wu, Fala Chen, Ron Ng, Kenneth Ma, Nancy Wu, Elena Kong, Him Law
Inbound Troubles	Wong Wai-sing	Lung Man-hong
Roger Kwok, Wong Cho-lam, Joey Meng, Ivana Wong, Angela Tong, Tommy Wong, Helena Law, Mimi Chu, Bowie Wu
Brother's Keeper	Amy Wong	Ng Siu-tung
Ruco Chan, Linda Chung, Edwin Siu, Kristal Tin, Louis Yuen, Louise Lee, Lau Kong, Louis Cheung
The Hippocratic Crush II	Poon Ka-tak	Lam Chung-bong, Tong Kin-ping
Lawrence Ng, Kenneth Ma, Tavia Yeung, Mandy Wong, Him Law, Tracy Chu, Eliza Sam, Louisa So, Benjamin Yuen
Bounty Lady	Jazz Boon	Leung Yan-tung, Lo Mei-wan
Dayo Wong, Kate Tsui, Sharon Chan, Louis Yuen, Hui Shiu-hung, Elena Kong, Samantha Ko, Sammy Sum

2014 (18th)
Title	Producer(s)	Story editor(s)
Actors
Line Walker	Jazz Boon	Yip Tin-shing, Leung Yan-tung, Ng Lap-kwong
Michael Miu, Charmaine Sheh, Raymond Lam, Sharon Chan, Hui Shiu-hung, Elena Kong, Sammy Sum, Oscar Leung, Toby Leung

2015 (19th)
Title	Producer(s)	Story editor(s)
Actors
Lord of Shanghai	Amy Wong	Ng Siu-tung
Anthony Wong, Kent Tong, Wayne Lai, Kenneth Ma, Myolie Wu, Louisa So, Ron Ng, Alice Chan, Eddie Kwan, Raymond Cho, Mat Yeung, Ngo Ka-nin, Natalie Tong

2016 (20th)
Title	Producer(s)	Story editor(s)
Actors
A Fist Within Four Walls	Jazz Boon	Yip Tin-shing, Steffie Lai
Ruco Chan, Nancy Wu, Benjamin Yuen, Carlo Ng, Philip Ng, Yuen Qiu, Lam Tsz-sin, Grace Wong, Moon Lau, Lily Leung, KK Cheung, Vincent Lam, Jimmy Au

2017 (21st)
Title	Producer(s)	Story editor(s)
Actors
My Ages Apart	Joe Chan	Kwan Chung-ling, Cheng Sing-mo
Bobby Au-yeung, Moses Chan, Louis Cheung, Kristal Tin, Ali Lee, Maggie Shiu, Benz Hui, Eddie Kwan, Sammy Leung, Elena Kong, Katy Kung, David Chiang

2018 (22nd)
Title	Producer(s)	Story editor(s)
Actors
Life on the Line	Dave Fong	Sin Tsui-ching
Joe Ma, Matthew Ho, Moon Lau, Jeannie Chan, Kelly Cheung, Joey Law, Ali Lee, Lee Shing-cheong, Willie Wai and Pinky Cheung, Bob Cheung and Arnold Kwok

2019 (23rd)
Title	Producer(s)	Story editor(s)
Actors
Big White Duel	Marco Law	Wong Wai-keung
Roger Kwok, Kenneth Ma, Natalie Tong, Ali Lee, Kelly Cheung, and Matthew Ho

== 2020s ==
2020 (24th)
Title	Producer(s)	Story editor(s)
Actors
Al Cappuccino	Lam Chi-wah	Wong Wai-keung
Vincent Wong, Owen Cheung, Crystal Fung, Samantha Ko, Angel Chiang, Winki Lai and Brian Chu

2021 (25th)
Title	Producer(s)	Story editor(s)
Actors
Battle Of The Seven Sisters	Joe Chan	Cheng Shing-mo
Priscilla Wong, Rosina Lam, Samantha Ko, Kaman Kong, and Jeannie Chan

2022 (26th)
Title	Producer(s)	Story editor(s)
Actors
Get On A Flat	Kwan Man Sum	Yi Mui Fung, Leong Man-wah
Paw-Hee-ching, Elena Kong, Andrew Lam, Andrew Yuen Man-kit, Rosita Kwok, Yuki Law, Bella Lam, Karl Ting, Eric Tang, Leo Kwan, Heidi Chu, King Ching-lam, Derek Wong, Kitterick Yiu

2023 (27th)
Title	Producer(s)	Story editor(s)
Actors
The Queen of News		

== Dramas with multiple awards ==
6 awards

- Heart of Greed
- Moonlight Resonance
- Rosy Business
- A Fist Within Four Walls

5 awards

- Line Walker

4 awards

- Triumph in the Skies II

3 awards

- Wars of In-Laws
- Can't Buy Me Love
- Lives of Omission
- Lord of Shanghai

== See also ==
- List of Asian television awards
