= List of TVB dramas in 2010 =

This is a list of television dramas released by TVB in 2010.

== Top ten drama series in ratings ==
The following is a list of TVB's top serial dramas in 2010 by average ratings. The list includes premiere week and final week ratings, as well as the average overall count of live Hong Kong viewers (in millions).

Highest-rating drama series of 2010
Rank	English title	Chinese title	Average	Peak	Premiere week	Final week	HK viewers (millions)
1	Can't Buy Me Love	公主嫁到	34	45	33	35	2.14
2	No Regrets	巾幗梟雄之義海豪情	33	47	31	34	2.10
3	The Mysteries of Love	談情說案	32	42	31	35	2.03
4	A Pillow Case of Mystery II	施公奇案 II	31	39	30	31	1.99
5	A Watchdog's Tale	老友狗狗	31	36	30	31	1.97
6	When Lanes Merge	情越雙白線	31	37	29	32	1.96
7	Every Move You Make	讀心神探	31	36	29	32	1.95
8	Gun Metal Grey	刑警	30	36	30	30	1.92
9	Ghost Writer	蒲松齡	30	41	28	33	1.91
10	A Fistful of Stances	鐵馬尋橋	29	43	25	32	1.82

== Awards ==
Category/Organization	2010 My AOD Favourite Awards 3 December 2010	2010 TVB Anniversary Awards 5 December 2010	15th Asian Television Awards 9 December 2010	StarHub TVB Awards 16 July 2011
Best Drama	Can't Buy Me Love	Can't Buy Me Love		No Regrets
Best Actor	Moses Chan; Can't Buy Me Love	Wayne Lai; No Regrets	Bowie Lam; Sisters of Pearl	Moses Chan; Can't Buy Me Love
Best Actress	Charmaine Sheh; Can't Buy Me Love	Sheren Tang; No Regrets		Charmaine Sheh; Can't Buy Me Love
Best Supporting Actor	Ngo Ka-nin; No Regrets	Mak Cheung-ching; No Regrets		—N/a
Best Supporting Actress	Fala Chen; No Regrets	Fala Chen; No Regrets	Susan Tse; Beyond the Realm of Conscience (from 2009)	—N/a
Most Improved Actor	—N/a	Raymond Wong Ho-yin; A Watchdog's Tale, When Lanes Merge, The Mysteries of Love, Can't Buy Me Love, No Regrets		King Kong Lee
Most Improved Actress	—N/a	Natalie Tong; A Watchdog's Tale, A Fistful of Stances, The Comeback Clan		Natalie Tong

== First line series ==
These dramas air in Hong Kong from 8:00pm to 8:30pm, Monday to Friday on Jade.

Broadcast	English title (Chinese title)	Eps.	Cast and crew	Theme song(s)	Avg. rating	Genre	Notes	Official website
20 Oct 2008– 12 Feb 2010	Off Pedder 畢打自己人	337	Catherine Tsang, Lo Jan-ok (producers); Teresa Mo, Elaine Jin, Wayne Lai, Stephen Au, Ivan Ho, Aimee Chan, Joyce Cheng, Elvina Kong	Opening: "Serenade No. 13" (Mozart); Ending: "無人完美" (Joyce Cheng)	27	Sitcom	HD format	Official website
15 Feb– 20 Feb	Don Juan DeMercado 情人眼裏高一D	6	Wong Wai-sing (producer); Bosco Wong, Wong Cho-lam, Kitty Yuen, Kate Tsui, Christine Kuo, Joel Chan		24	Romance	HD format New Years mini-series	Official website
22 Feb– 12 Jun	OL Supreme 女王辦公室	80	Wong Wai-sing (producer); Liza Wang, Chapman To, Denise Ho, Ron Ng, Joel Chan, Cheung Kwok-keung, Sire Ma, Koni Lui	Opening: "捱" (Ron Ng, Chapman To, Denise Ho); Ending: "愛作戰" (Denise Ho)	25	Sitcom	HD format	Official website
14 Jun– 28 Nov	Some Day 天天天晴	118	Tsui Yu-on (producer); Louise Lee, Teresa Mo, Wayne Lai, Wong He, Kristal Tin, Johnson Lee, Aimee Chan, Tsui Wing, Lau Dan	"半杯水" (Tang Siu-hau)	26	Sitcom	HD format	Official website
29 Nov 2010– 18 Mar	Show Me the Happy 依家有喜	80	Poon Ka-tak (producer); Roger Kwok, Bernice Liu, Michelle Yim, Paul Chun, Annie Liu, Benz Hui, Derek Kok	"依家有喜" (Bernice Liu); Insert: "衣不稱身" (Auston Lam)	24	Sitcom	HD format	Official website

== Second line series ==
These dramas air in Hong Kong from 8:30pm to 9:30pm, Monday to Friday on Jade.

Broadcast	English title (Chinese title)	Eps.	Cast and crew	Theme song(s)	Avg. rating	Genre	Notes	Official website
28 Dec 2009– 23 Jan	A Watchdog's Tale 老友狗狗	20	Leung Choi-yuen (producer); Steven Ma, Linda Chung, Kent Cheng, Maggie Shiu, Raymond Wong Ho-yin, Natalie Tong	"老友狗狗" (Steven Ma, Linda Chung)	31	Comedy drama		Official website
25 Jan– 5 Mar	The Bronze Teeth IV 鐵齒銅牙紀曉嵐IV	31	Liu Jiacheng (producer); Zhang Guoli, Wang Gang, Zhang Tie Lin, Yuan Li, Miriam Yeung, Liu Yi Wei	Opening: "誰說書生百無一用" (Jin Xuefeng); Insert: "鐵齒銅牙紀曉嵐" (Rao Dai); Insert: "圓缺" (Miriam Yeung)	29	Costume drama	HD format Overseas production (China)	Official website
8 Mar– 2 Apr	In the Eye of the Beholder 秋香怒點唐伯虎	20	Lau Kar-ho (producer); Moses Chan, Myolie Wu, Ha Yu, Fala Chen, Johnson Lee, Lai Lok-yi, Elaine Yiu	"秋香怒點唐伯虎" (Jin Au-yeung, Wong Cho-lam)	28	Costume drama, Comedy	HD format Copyright notice: 2009.	Official website
5 Apr– 1 May	Suspects in Love 搜下留情	20	Poon Ka-tak (producer); Joe Ma, Flora Chan, Sharon Chan, Him Law, Louis Yuen, Mandy Wong, Power Chan, Shek Sau, Rain Lau	"一不留神" (Joe Ma)	28	Drama	Copyright notice: 2009.	Official website
3 May– 5 Jun	Sisters of Pearl 掌上明珠	28	Lam Chi-wah (producer); Jessica Hsuan, Kiki Sheung, Bowie Lam, Michael Tao, Joyce Tang, Macy Chan, Joel Chan	"忘掉自己" (Myolie Wu)	28	Period drama	Copyright notice: 2009.	Official website
7 Jun– 9 Jul	Ghost Writer 蒲松齡	25	Leung Choi-yuen (producer); Steven Ma, Sunny Chan, Linda Chung, Fala Chen	"心竅" (Steven Ma)	30	Costume drama, Fantasy adventure		Official website
12 Jul– 6 Aug	A Pillow Case of Mystery II 施公奇案II	21	Lam Chi-wah (producer); Bobby Au Yeung, Jessica Hsuan, Johnson Lee, Leila Tong, Joel Chan	"別低估我" (Wong Cho-lam)	31	Costume drama, Fantasy, Mystery	HD format	Official website
9 Aug– 17 Sep	Growing Through Life 摘星之旅	30	Tommy Leung, Raymond Chai (producers); Damian Lau, Raymond Lam, Bosco Wong, Cecilia Yip, Zhao Ziqi, Toby Leung, Dominic Lam, Lui Yau-wai, Vionn Song, Power Chan, Vivien Yeo, Cheung Kwok-keung, Mimi Chu	Opening: "所謂理想" (Raymond Lam); Ending: "我們很好" (Raymond Lam)	26	Drama	HD format Co-production with Shanghai Television	Official website
20 Sep– 15 Oct	The Comeback Clan 翻叮一族	20	Kwan Wing-chung (producer); Ha Yu, Benz Hui, Kiki Sheung, Christine Ng, Sammul Chan, Ngo Ka-nin, Shirley Yeung, Natalie Tong	"八十前後" (FAMA)	26	Drama	HD format	Official website
18 Oct– 28 Nov	No Regrets 巾幗梟雄之義海豪情	32	Lee Tim-shing (producer); Sheren Tang, Wayne Lai, Raymond Wong Ho-yin, Fala Chen, Kara Hui, Elliot Ngok, Susan Tse, Ngo Ka-nin, Nancy Wu, Evergreen Mak	"義海豪情" (Leo Ku)	33	Period drama	HD format 43rd Anniversary Drama	Official website
29 Nov– 24 Dec	Twilight Investigation 囧探查過界	20	Marco Law (producer); Wong He, Linda Chung, Raymond Wong Ho-yin, Johnson Lee, Power Chan, Queenie Chu, Kingdom Yuen, Shek Sau	"食腦" (Wong He, Raymond Wong Ho-yin, Johnson Lee)	28	Comedy, Mystery		Official website
27 Dec– 21 Jan 2011	Home Troopers 居家兵團	20	Lam Chi-wah (producer); Liza Wang, Ha Yu, Kevin Cheng, Bernice Liu, Christine Kuo, Raymond Cho, Vincent Wong, Mandy Wong, Angela Tong	"幸福節奏" (Stephanie Ho)	27	Drama		Official website

== Third line series ==
These dramas air in Hong Kong from 9:30pm to 10:30pm, Monday to Friday on Jade.

Broadcast	English title (Chinese title)	Eps.	Cast and crew	Theme song(s)	Avg. rating	Genre	Notes	Official website
14 Dec 2009– 8 Jan	The Beauty of the Game 美麗高解像	20	Tsui Yu-on (producer); Kate Tsui, Christine Ng, Raymond Cho, Sharon Chan, Lai Lok-yi, Kingdom Yuen, Wong Cho-lam, Mimi Lo	"愛無愧" (Denise Ho)	27	Drama		Official website
11 Jan– 12 Feb	The Season of Fate 五味人生	25	Nelson Cheung (producer); Roger Kwok, Esther Kwan, Michelle Yim, Lawrence Ng Wai-kwok, Derek Kok, Elena Kong, Oscar Leung, Mimi Lo, Ngo Ka-nin, Vivien Yeo	"細味" (Michael Tse)	27	Period drama	Copyright notice: 2009.	Official website
16 Feb– 16 Mar	My Better Half 老公萬歲	20	Terry Tong (producer); Michael Miu, Maggie Cheung, Michael Tse, Theresa Lee, Derek Kwok, Grace Wong, Mandy Cho, Mimi Lo, Oscar Leung	"大丈夫日記" (Michael Miu, Michael Tse)	26	Comedy	HD format Copyright notice: 2009.	Official website
17 Mar– 18 Apr	A Fistful of Stances 鐵馬尋橋	25	Lee Tim-shing (producer); Kevin Cheng, Tavia Yeung, Kenneth Ma, Yuen Qiu, Shirley Yeung, Selena Li, Natalie Tong, Nancy Wu, Dominic Lam	"雪下思" (Kevin Cheng)	29	Period drama, Martial arts	HD format Copyright notice: 2009.	Official website
19 Apr– 22 May	Fly with Me 飛女正傳	25	Jonathan Chik (producer); Ada Choi, Moses Chan, Raymond Cho, Kenny Wong	"飛女正傳" (Chan Kwok-leung)	27	Comedy, Superhero	HD format Copyright notice: 2009.	Official website
24 May– 25 Jun	The Mysteries of Love 談情說案	25	Lau Kar-ho (producer); Raymond Lam, Tavia Yeung, Kenneth Ma, Bernice Liu	"直到你不找我" (Raymond Lam)	32	Drama, Mystery	HD format	Official website
28 Jun– 23 Jul	When Lanes Merge 情越雙白線	20	Leung Choi-yuen (producer); Kent Cheng, Raymond Wong Ho-yin, Kate Tsui, Sonija Kwok, Lee Heung-kam, Raymond Cho	"不離不棄" (Ryan Lau)	31	Drama		Official website
26 Jul– 20 Aug	Beauty Knows No Pain 女人最痛	20	Lam Chi-wah (producer); Michelle Yim, Maggie Cheung, Joe Ma, Joyce Tang, Dominic Lam, Power Chan	"女人最痛" (Fergus Chow)	28	Drama		Official website
23 Aug– 3 Oct	Can't Buy Me Love 公主嫁到	32	Mui Siu-ching (producer); Charmaine Sheh, Moses Chan, Linda Chung, Raymond Wong Ho-yin, Fala Chen, Kenneth Ma, Susanna Kwan, Lee Heung-kam, Louis Yuen, Selena Li, Sharon Chan, Joseph Lee, Mary Hon, Kara Hui, Susan Tse	"萬千寵愛" (Susanna Kwan)	34	Costume drama, Comedy	HD format	Official website
4 Oct– 29 Oct	Every Move You Make 讀心神探	20	Tsui Yu-on (producer); Bowie Lam, Kristal Tin, Bosco Wong, Lai Lok-yi, Lorretta Chow, Jack Hui, Aimee Chan, Susan Tse, Yu Yang	"心中有數" (Bowie Lam)	31	Police procedural		Official website
1 Nov– 11 Dec	Gun Metal Grey 刑警	30	Terry Tong (producer); Felix Wong, Michael Miu, Jessica Hsuan, Nancy Wu, Vincent Wong	Opening: "灰色控訴" (Super 4); Ending: "我的離開也是愛" (Alfred Hui)	30	Police procedural thriller	43rd Anniversary Drama	Official website
13 Dec– 7 Jan 2011	Links to Temptation 誘情轉駁	20	Tsui Yu-on (producer); Steven Ma, Fala Chen, Yoyo Mung, Kenny Wong, Johnson Lee, Timmy Hung	"愛情轉駁" (Fala Chen)	28	Drama		Official website

== Warehoused series ==
These dramas were released overseas and have not broadcast on the TVB Jade Channel.

English title (Chinese title)	Eps.	Cast and crew	Theme song(s)	Genre	Notes	Ref.
Cupid Stupid 戀愛星求人	20	Tsui Yu-on (producer); Steven Ma, Michael Tse, Tavia Yeung	"聽說" (Steven Ma)	Romance	Released overseas on January 25, 2010. Aired on TVB Pay Vision Channel in February 2010 and TVB Jade on February 1, 2013. Copyright notice: 2009.	
