= List of TVB dramas in 2012 =

This is a list of television serial dramas released by TVB in 2012.

== Top ten drama series in ratings ==
The following is a list of the highest-rated drama series released by TVB in 2012. The list includes premiere week, final week ratings, series finale ratings, as well as the average overall count of live Hong Kong viewers (in millions).

Highest-rated drama series of 2012
Rank	English title	Chinese title	Average	Peak	Premiere week	Final week	Series finale	HK viewers (millions)
1	Witness Insecurity	護花危情	31.75	39	30	33	32	2.013
2	The Confidant	大太監	31	37	31	31	35	1.974
3	Divas in Distress	巴不得媽媽...	30.8	36	30	31	33	1.959
4	The Hippocratic Crush	On Call 36小時	30.6	39	29	33	37	1.958
5	Daddy Good Deeds	當旺爸爸	30.2	35	30	32	31	1.919
6	Three Kingdoms RPG	回到三國	30	45	30	29	31	1.918
7	The Last Steep Ascent	天梯	30	39	28	32	35	1.917
8	Highs and Lows	雷霆掃毒	30	38	29	30	35	1.915
9	The Greatness of a Hero	盛世仁傑	30	36	28	31	32	1.910
10	Gloves Come Off	拳王	29.9	35	29	31	34	1.908

== Awards ==
Category/Organization	My AOD Favourite Awards 2 December 2012	17th Asian Television Awards 7 December 2012	2012 TVB Anniversary Awards 17 December 2012	StarHub TVB Awards 28 September 2013
Best Drama	The Hippocratic Crush		When Heaven Burns	Triumph In the Skies II (from 2013)
Best Actor	Kenneth Ma; The Hippocratic Crush	Moses Chan; When Heaven Burns	Wayne Lai; The Confidant	Bosco Wong; Witness Insecurity
Best Actress	Tavia Yeung; The Hippocratic Crush		Tavia Yeung; Silver Spoon, Sterling Shackles	
Best Supporting Actor	Him Law; The Hippocratic Crush		Koo Ming-wah; Divas in Distress	—N/a
Best Supporting Actress	Nancy Wu; Gloves Come Off			—N/a
Most Improved Actor	Oscar Leung; L'Escargot	—N/a	Oscar Leung; L'Escargot, Queens of Diamonds and Hearts, House of Harmony and Vengeance, Tiger Cubs, The Confidant, Big Boys Club	Him Law; L'Escargot, The Hippocratic Crush, Tiger Cubs, Divas in Distress
Most Improved Actress	Mandy Wong; L'Escargot	—N/a	Mandy Wong; L'Escargot, The Hippocratic Crush, Tiger Cubs, Divas in Distress	

== First line-up ==
These dramas air in Hong Kong from 8:00pm to 8:30pm, Monday to Friday on Jade.

Broadcast	English title (Chinese title)	Eps.	Cast and crew	Theme song(s)	Avg. rating	Genre	Notes	Official website
31 Oct 2011– 11 May	Til Love Do Us Lie 結·分@謊情式	139	Kwan Wing-chung (producer); Eddie Cheung, Kiki Sheung, Joyce Tang, Hanjin Tan, Lin Xiawei, Benjamin Yuen, Susan Tse, Bowie Wu	"Right On Time" (Hanjin Tan, Kiki Sheung)	25	Sitcom		Official website
14 May– present	Come Home Love 愛·回家	700	Lau Dan, Tsui Wing, Lai Lok-yi, Florence Kwok, Yvonne Lam, Joey Law, Angel Chiang, Queenie Chu, Carlo Ng, Samantha Ko, Jimmy Au	"擁抱愛" (Joyce Cheng)	TBA	Sitcom		Official website

== Second line-up ==
These dramas air in Hong Kong from 8:30pm to 9:30pm, Monday to Friday on Jade.

Broadcast	English title (Chinese title)	Eps.	Cast and crew	Theme song(s)	Avg. rating	Genre	Notes	Official website
6 Dec 2011– 2 Jan	Bottled Passion 我的如意狼君	21	Lee Tim-shing (producer); Niki Chow, Raymond Wong Ho-yin, Elaine Yiu, Katy Kung, Raymond Cho, Claire Yiu, Rebecca Chan	"朝花夕拾" (Teresa Cheung)	29	Period drama		Official website
3 Jan– 29 Jan	Wish and Switch 換樂無窮	20	Lam Chi-wah (producer); Myolie Wu, Selena Li, Johnson Lee, Vincent Wong, Kiki Sheung, Angela Tong	"交換快樂" (Myolie Wu, Johnson Lee)	28	Comedy drama	Standard format Copyright notice: 2011.	Official website
30 Jan– 24 Feb	Let It Be Love; 4 in Love	20	Jonathan Chik (producer); Moses Chan, Charmaine Sheh, Kenny Wong, Elvina Kong, Queenie Chu, Tracy Ip	"Fall in Love" (Moses Chan)	27	Romance	Copyright notice: 2011.	Official website
27 Feb– 1 April	Queens of Diamonds and Hearts 東西宮略	25	Wong Wai-sing (producer); Roger Kwok, Fala Chen, Sharon Chan, Louis Yuen, Ben Wong, Raymond Cho, Kitty Yuen, Koni Lui, Yoyo Chen, Oscar Leung	"缺陷美" (Fala Chen)	29	Costume drama, comedy fantasy		Official website
2 Apr– 27 Apr	The Greatness of a Hero 盛世仁傑	20	Leung Choi-yuen (producer); Kent Cheng, Sunny Chan, Sonija Kwok, Bernice Liu, Wayne Lai, Lee Heung-kam, Rebecca Chan, Leila Tong	"定局" (Hins Cheung)	30	Historical fiction	Standard format Released overseas on February 9, 2009. Copyright notice: 2008.	Official website
30 Apr– 8 June	House of Harmony and Vengeance 耀舞長安	30	Nelson Cheung (producer); Bobby Au-yeung, Myolie Wu, Linda Chung, Evergreen Mak	"愛歌" (Wong Cho-lam, Louis Yuen, Johnson Lee)	29.5	Costume drama	TVB's last standard format production	Official website
11 June– 6 July	No Good Either Way 衝呀！瘦薪兵團	20	Amy Wong (producer); Ruco Chan, Kristal Tin, Louis Yuen, Gill Mohindepaul Singh, Natalie Tong, Jason Chan, Stephen Au, Florence Kwok	"瘦薪族" (Louis Yuen, Ruco Chan, Gill Mohindepaul Singh)	29	Comedy drama		Official website
9 July– 10 Aug	Three Kingdoms RPG 回到三國	25	Lau Kar-ho (producer); Raymond Lam, Kenneth Ma, Ruco Chan, Tavia Yeung, Ha Yu, Lau Kong, Cilla Kung	"等你回來" (Raymond Lam)	30	Historical fiction, science fiction		Official website
13 Aug– 16 Sept	King Maker 造王者	28	Leung Choi-yuen (producer); Wayne Lai, Kent Cheng, Pierre Ngo, Lai Lok-yi, Kristal Tin, Natalie Tong, Elaine Yiu, Kingdom Yuen, Florence Kwok, Kwok Fung	"追夢者" (Leo Ku)	29	Historical fiction		Official website
17 Sep– 19 Oct	The Last Steep Ascent 天梯	25	Lee Tim-shing (producer); Moses Chan, Maggie Cheung Ho-yee, Kenny Wong, Aimee Chan, Helena Law, Edwin Siu, KK Cheung, Elliot Ngok	"一生一心" (Hubert Wu)	30	Period drama, romance		Official website
22 Oct– 14 Dec	Silver Spoon, Sterling Shackles 名媛望族	40	Chong Wai-kin (producer); Damian Lau, Idy Chan, Tavia Yeung, Kenneth Ma, Ron Ng, Rebecca Zhu, Elena Kong, Mary Hon, JJ Jia, Vincent Wong, Sire Ma, Shek Sau, Ben Wong	Opening: "此時此刻" (Fiona Sit); Ending: "有時" (Ron Ng)	29	Period drama	45th Anniversary Drama	Official website
18 Dec– 11 Jan	Missing You 幸福摩天輪	20	Fong Chun-chiu (producer); Linda Chung, Jason Chan, Lin Xiawei, Ram Chiang, Cilla Kung, Calvin Chan	"幸福歌" (Linda Chung)	TBA	Drama		Official website

== Third line-up ==
These dramas air in Hong Kong from 9:30pm to 10:30pm, Monday to Friday on Jade.

Broadcast	English title (Chinese title)	Eps.	Cast and crew	Theme song(s)	Avg. rating	Genre	Notes	Official website
21 Nov 2011– 1 Jan	When Heaven Burns 天與地	30	Jonathan Chik (producer); Bowie Lam, Moses Chan, Kenny Wong, Charmaine Sheh, Maggie Shiu, Elaine Jin	Opening: "天與地" (Paul Wong); Ending: "年少無知" (Bowie Lam, Moses Chan, Kenny Wong)	25	Drama	Copyright notice: 2010.	Official website
3 Jan– 12 Feb	L'Escargot 缺宅男女	30	Nelson Cheung (producer); Michael Miu, Sonija Kwok, Michael Tse, Linda Chung, Ron Ng, Joyce Tang	"傷城記" (Ron Ng, Linda Chung)	29	Drama	Copyright notice: 2011.	Official website
13 Feb– 16 Mar	The Hippocratic Crush; On Call 36小時	25	Poon Ka-tak (producer); Kenneth Ma, Tavia Yeung, Him Law, Mandy Wong, Benjamin Yuen, Candy Chang	"連續劇" (Joey Yung)	30.6	Medical drama		Official website
19 Mar– 13 Apr	Daddy Good Deeds 當旺爸爸	20	Mui Siu-ching (producer); Ha Yu, Steven Ma, Linda Chung, Edwin Siu, Evergreen Mak, Nancy Wu, Cilla Kung, Chow Chung	"從未在意" (Edwin Siu)	30.2	Comedy drama		Official website
16 Apr– 18 May	Gloves Come Off 拳王	25	Marco Law (producer); Kevin Cheng, Raymond Wong Ho-yin, Selena Li, Natalie Tong, Nancy Wu, Kenny Wong	"一擊即中" (Kevin Cheng)	29.9	Action drama		Official website
21 May– 29 June	Master of Play 心戰	30	Jonathan Chik (producer); Adam Cheng, Moses Chan, Kenny Wong, Maggie Shiu, Aimee Chan	"界限" (Adam Cheng)	25	Crime drama, thriller	Copyright notice: 2011.	Official website
2 July– 27 July	Witness Insecurity 護花危情	20	Lau Kar-ho (producer); Linda Chung, Bosco Wong, Paul Chun, Ram Chiang, Cilla Kung, Ronald Law, Queenie Chu	"最幸福的事" (Linda Chung)	31.75	Action drama, romance		Official website
30 July– 25 Aug	Ghetto Justice II 怒火街頭2	21	Tommy Leung, Joe Chan (producers); Kevin Cheng, Myolie Wu, Sam Lee, Alex Lam, Raymond Cho, Evergreen Mak, Christine Kuo, Elena Kong	"沒時間後悔" (Hanjin Tan, Jin Au-yeung)	29	Legal drama		Official website
27 Aug– 23 Sep	Divas in Distress 巴不得媽媽…	22	Poon Ka-tak (producer); Liza Wang, Gigi Wong, Chin Kar-lok, Him Law, Mandy Wong, Eliza Sam, Chung King-fai	"能否愛遇上" (Edmond Leung)	30.8	Comedy drama		Official website
24 Sep– 4 Nov	Highs and Lows 雷霆掃毒	30	Lam Chi-wah (producer); Michael Miu, Raymond Lam, Kate Tsui, Elaine Ng, Ella Koon, Ben Wong, Jin Au-yeung, Derek Kok, Alex Lam, Law Lok-lam	Opening: "雷霆掃毒" (Theme music); Ending: "幼稚完" (Raymond Lam)	30	Crime drama, action		Official website
5 Nov– 16 Dec	The Confidant 大太監	33	Marco Law (producer); Wayne Lai, Michelle Yim, Maggie Shiu, Raymond Wong Ho-yin, Aimee Chan, Nancy Wu, Raymond Cho, Edwin Siu, Elliot Ngok, Natalie Tong, Oscar Leung, Power Chan	Opening: "相濡以沫" (Shirley Kwan); Ending: "日月" (Wayne Lai, Nancy Wu)	31	Historic fiction	45th Anniversary Drama	Official website
18 Dec– 18 Jan	Friendly Fire 法網狙擊	26	Tommy Leung, Man Wai-hung (producers); Michael Tse, Tavia Yeung, Sammy Leung, Sharon Chan, Louis Yuen, Benz Hui, Alice Chan, Vincent Wong, Oscar Leung	Opening: "疑幻人生" (Michael Tse, Sammy Leung)	28	Legal drama		

== Weekend dramas ==
These dramas air in Hong Kong every Sunday nights from 10:00pm to 11:30pm on Jade.

Broadcast	English title (Chinese title)	Eps.	Cast and crew	Theme song(s)	Avg. rating	Genre	Notes	Official website
24 Jun– 12 Aug	Tiger Cubs 飛虎	13	Lam Chi-wah (producer); Joe Ma, Jessica Hsuan, Him Law, Oscar Leung, Vincent Wong, Mandy Wong	"身邊的依據" (Joe Ma)	28.3	Police procedural, action	airs two days a week starting 14 July 2012; Copyright notice: 2011.	Official website

== Warehoused dramas ==
These dramas were first premiered overseas before an official release on the local TVB Jade Channel.

Release	English title (Chinese title)	Eps.	Cast and crew	Theme song(s)	Genre	Notes	Ref.
April 2012	Sergeant Tabloid 女警愛作戰	21	Nelson Cheung (producer); Niki Chow, Michael Tse, Mandy Wong, Matthew Ko	"中心點" (Niki Chow, Michael Tse)	Action comedy drama	Premiered in Hong Kong on 11 March 2013.	
