= The Condor Heroes Return =

1994 Hong Kong TV series

- DVD cover art
- 射鵰英雄傳之南帝北丐
- Genre: Wuxia
- Based on: The Legend of the Condor Heroes by Jin Yong
- Screenplay by: Chan Ching-yee; Wong Lei-chi; Kwan Tsung-ling; Lee Sui-ping
- Directed by: Lin Chi-fan; Luk Tin-wah; Tang Kam-chuen; Lau Kwok-fai
- Starring: Ekin Cheng; Marco Ngai; Wong Siu-yin; Charine Chan; Chan Wai-yee; Wayne Lai
- Theme music composer: Joseph Koo
- Opening theme: "Never Wake Up from Drunkenness in My Whole Life" (一生不醉醒) by Jacky Cheung
- Country of origin: Hong Kong
- Original language: Cantonese
- No. of episodes: 20

Production
- Producer: Chong Wai-kin
- Running time: ≈45 minutes per episode
- Production company: TVB

Original release
- Network: TVB Jade
- Release: 16 March – 17 April 1994

The Condor Heroes Return (射鵰英雄傳之南帝北丐) is a Hong Kong wuxia television series loosely adapted from the novel The Legend of the Condor Heroes by Jin Yong, serving as the backstories for the characters Duan Zhixing and Hong Qigong. The series was released overseas in October 1993 before being broadcast on TVB Jade in Hong Kong in March 1994.

== Synopsis ==
The series is set in 12th-century China against the backdrop of the wars between the Jin and Song dynasties. Hong Qi, the son of a wealthy restaurant owner, meets the Beggar Clan's chief Qian Hexing by chance and becomes Qian's apprentice. Qian is betrayed and mortally injured by his deputy Cheng Tieshan, who seizes the clan's leadership position. Before dying, Qian passes the Dog-Beating Staff to Hong and provides him clues to a secret location where the manuals for the Beggar Clan's most powerful martial arts are hidden. Hong finds the manuals, learns those skills, and vows to avenge his master.

Zhan Zhixing has been raised by his mother Zhan Yulan in Lingjiu Palace and grown up with his childhood sweetheart Miao Si'en, the palace mistress's daughter. His father is actually Duan Wenzhong, the ruler of the Dali Kingdom. Tragedy befalls him when Duan Wenzhong's brother Duan Wenyi conspires with Jin forces to attack Lingjiu Palace, killing everyone except Miao. Seeing the Duans as responsible for his mother's death, Zhixing swears vengeance on them.

By chance, Hong and Zhixing meet each other and become close friends. At one point, both of them are poisoned and there is only one antidote left; Zhixing willingly gives the antidote to Hong. Zhixing is later healed by Duan Wenzhong, who then passes the throne to his son. Zhixing trains hard in the Dali royal family's martial arts and hopes to avenge his mother.

Hong ultimately defeats and kills Cheng, but incurs the hatred of Xuexin, Cheng's daughter who has feelings for him. Overwhelmed by fury and grief, Xuexin commits suicide with Zhixing's sword in the hope of destroying Hong and Zhixing's friendship. Hong, who has become the Beggar Clan's chief, is secretly poisoned by his possessive lover Shuiling, causing his neigong to deteriorate over time so that he will eventually have no choice but to remain with her. Shuiling also instigates conflict between Hong and Zhixing, resulting in a confrontation between the two friends. During their fight, Zhixing points out that Hong's neigong has weakened, and it is only then that Hong realises what Shuiling has done to him.

Shuiling is mortally wounded later. While dying, she attempts to kill Hong so that they can be together in death. Hong survives and recovers with the help of Zhixing, Wang Chongyang and Zhou Botong. Later, Hong teams up with Zhixing to defeat and kill the Jin prince Wanyan Hongjie and Jin royal adviser Leiting Shangren.

Zhixing ultimately gives up the throne after witnessing the deaths of two women he loves and feeling guilty for refusing to save Liu Ying and Zhou Botong's critically wounded child. He becomes a Buddhist monk called "Yideng", while Hong, now known as the "Nine-Fingered Divine Beggar", roams the jianghu to fight injustice and help the poor.

== Cast ==
- Ekin Cheng as Zhan Zhixing
- Marco Ngai as Hong Qi
- Wong Siu-yin as Cheng Xuexin
- Charine Chan as Liu Ying
- Chan Wai-yee as Miao Si'en
- Wayne Lai as Zhou Botong
- Cheung Ying-choi as Wang Chongyang
- Lam Seung-mou as Qian Hexing
- Lee Ka-keung as Lu Youjiao
- Kong Hon as Cheng Tieshan
- Mak Ka-lun as Manager Qi
- Wong Wai as Duen Zhengxing
- Lau Ying-hong as Zhan Yulan
- Man Kit-wan as the mistress of Lingjiu Palace
- Wong Wai-tak as Chu Dongshan
- Wong Man-piu as Zhang Shaoshou
- Cheng Ka-sang as Wu Santong
- Kwok Cheuk-wah as Zhu Ziliu
- Kwok Cheng-hung as Wanyan Hongjie
- Henry Lee as Duan Wenyi
- Kwan Ching as Qiu Qianren
- Lo Mang as Leiting Shangren
- Lee Kwai-ying as Shuiling
- Fung Hiu-man as Mulin
- Lee Yiu-king as Jingang
- Siu Cheuk-yiu as Tuchuan
- Wong Kin-fung as Huochong
- Lee Lung-kei as Jin Yagui
- Tse Yuet-may as Hong Qi's mother
- Wong Chung-hong as Zhuyougao
- Wong Wai-lam as Niubainan
- Siu Yuk-yin as Honglian
- Ng Lit-wah as Mitao
- Cheung Man-duen as Nanxing
- Chu Tit-wo as Liu Guang
- Koi Ngok as Dukong
- Mak Ho-wai as Emperor Gaozong
- Tsang Kin-ming as a Dali citizen
- Mak Tze-wun as a Dali official
- Sit Chun as a constable
- Chan Fung-bing as a matchmaker
- Wong Seung-sing, Yu Tin-wai and Yip Tsan-wai as Beggar Clan elders
- Shek Ngai-wan, Gordon Lam, Cho Tsai, Yau Biu, Cheung Wang-wai and Cheung Hoi-kan as Beggar Clan members
- Chan Min-leung, Tang Yu-wing and Wong Wai-leung as the kidnappers
- Tang Yu-chiu and Bok Gwan as villagers
