= Violent Cop (2000 film) =

2000 Hong Kong film by Steve Cheng

- Film poster
- Traditional Chinese: 暴力刑警
- Simplified Chinese: 暴力刑警
- Hanyu Pinyin: Bào Lì Xíng Jǐng
- Jyutping: Bou6 Lik6 Jing4 Ging2
- Directed by: Steve Cheng
- Screenplay by: Carry Cheng
- Produced by: Lee Siu-kei
- Starring: Anthony Wong; Michael Wong; Wayne Lai; Astrid Chan; Iris Chai; Moses Chan
- Cinematography: Edmond Fung
- Edited by: Angie Lam
- Music by: Tommy Wai
- Production company: Jing's Production
- Release date: 28 January 2000
- Running time: 88 minutes
- Country: Hong Kong
- Language: Cantonese
- Box office: HK$83,595

Violent Cop is 2000 Hong Kong action film directed by Steve Cheng and starring Anthony Wong, Michael Wong and Wayne Lai.

== Plot ==
A cop teams up with a pimp to catch a killer who castrates his male victims.

== Cast ==
- Anthony Wong as Tai Pan-kim
- Michael Wong as Inspector Cuba Koo
- Wayne Lai as Tse Chun-mao
- Astrid Chan as Koo's Wife
- Iris Chai as Cee
- Moses Chan as Yuen Wai-hau
- Thomas Sin as Killer
- William Ho as Brother Scar
- Lo Hung as Chun-mao's father
- Chung Yeung
- Ngo Wai-kong as Officer Tsang
- Ankee Leung as Friend of Cuba
- Thomas Hudak as Priest
- Leung Ka-po as Delivery man
- Wong Chi-man
