= Rage and Passion =

1992 Hong Kong TV series

- VCD cover art
- 中神通王重陽
- Genre: Wuxia
- Based on: The Legend of the Condor Heroes and The Return of the Condor Heroes by Jin Yong
- Screenplay by: Wong Chui-fa
- Directed by: Yu Ming-sang
- Starring: Ekin Cheng; Fiona Leung
- Opening theme: "Hurriedly in a Dream" (匆匆一夢中) by Andy Hui
- Country of origin: Hong Kong
- Original language: Cantonese
- No. of episodes: 20

Production
- Producer: Yu Ming-sang
- Production location: Hong Kong
- Running time: ≈45 minutes per episode
- Production company: TVB

Original release
- Network: TVB Jade
- Release: 31 October 1992

Rage and Passion (中神通王重陽) is a Hong Kong wuxia television series loosely adapted from the novels The Legend of the Condor Heroes and The Return of the Condor Heroes by Jin Yong, serving as a backstory for Wang Chongyang, a character who is only mentioned by name in the novels. It was released overseas on 31 October 1992.

== Synopsis ==
The series is set in 12th-century China against the backdrop of the wars between the Jin and Song empires. Tiansheng, who has been groomed to be the next master of the Taoist School, falls in love with Cheng Ruoshi. After Cheng Ruoshi becomes pregnant with Tiansheng's child, they elope and live in an ancient tomb in the Zhongnan Mountains. Upon learning that his treacherous senior Xuansheng is collaborating with Jin forces to steal the highly coveted martial arts manual Jiuyin Zhenjing, Tiansheng works together with the Song general Huo Jingshan to stop them.

Xuansheng leads Jin forces to attack the Zhongnan Mountains and holds Cheng Ruoshi and Tiansheng's newborn son hostage to force Tiansheng to surrender. Both Tiansheng and Cheng Ruoshi perish in the fight; their son is saved by Lin Lingsu and Huang Chang. Lin Lingsu and Huang Chang are later poisoned with aphrodisiac by Xuansheng and end up having sex against their will, deepening their misunderstanding. Xuansheng takes advantage of the chaos to steal half of the Jiuyin Zhenjing. Huang Chang, carrying Tiansheng's son, falls off a cliff.

Tiansheng's son survives and grows up in the wild under the name "Dog". One day, he saves Lin Chaoying from trouble, but she mistakenly thinks that he has bad intentions and wants to kill him. It turns out later that Lin Chaoying is the daughter of Lin Lingsu and Huang Chang, and she has been influenced by her mother to think that Huang Chang is her enemy. Dog meets and befriends Wanyan Feng, a Jin prince, and they become sworn brothers. At Wanyan Feng's suggestion, Dog also renames himself "Wang Chongyang". Later, Wanyan Feng meets and falls in love with Huo Wushuang.

Meanwhile, Xuansheng is plotting with Jin forces to dominate the wulin. When Wang Chongyang learns that Xuansheng is responsible for his parents' deaths, he organises a militia and joins forces with Lin Chaoying to confront Xuansheng and fight the Jin forces.

== Cast ==
- Ekin Cheng as Wang Chongyang
- Fiona Leung as Lin Chaoying
- Gallen Lo as Wanyan Feng
- Eddie Kwan as Tiansheng
- Vivian Chow as Cheng Ruoshi
- Newton Lai as Changsheng / Huang Chang
- Mary Hon as Lin Lingsu
- Lam Sheung-mo as Xuansheng
- Cheung Yick as Huo Jingshan
- Money Lo as Huo Wushuang
- Wayne Lai as Zhou Botong
- Cheung Ying-choi as Tianlong
- Henry Lee as Liansheng
- Cheng Lui as Wanyan Gui
- Pau Fong as the sect leader
- Amy Wu as Zhou Yueying
- Ho Pik-kin as the abbot
- Lee Yiu-king as Cangsong
- Lee Wong-sang as Gusong
- Mak Tsi-wan as Chisong
- Tsui Po-lun as Qingsong
- Carson Lee as Wanyan Ba
- Mak Ho-wai as the Jin royal adviser
- Choi Kwok-hing as Hatu
- Au Ngok as a farmer
- Chan Yin-hong as Azhu
- Wilson Tsui as Aqin
- Law Kwan-tso as Ahu
- Lily Liu as Sun Daniang
