= The Gentle Crackdown II =

- Official poster
- 秀才愛上兵
- Genre: Costume Comedy
- Starring: Steven Ma; Yumiko Cheng; Wayne Lai; Ha Yu
- Opening theme: "豺狼與羊" by Steven Ma & Yumiko Cheng
- Country of origin: Hong Kong
- Original language: Cantonese
- No. of episodes: 20

Production
- Producer: Lau Kar Ho
- Running time: 45 minutes (approx.)

Original release
- Network: TVB
- Release: January 21 – February 15, 2008

Related
- The Gentle Crackdown (2005)

The Gentle Crackdown II (Traditional Chinese: 秀才愛上兵) is a TVB costume comedy series broadcast in January 2008. The reboot series stars Wayne Lai, Steven Ma, Yumiko Cheng, and Ha Yu.

== Synopsis ==
Having lost her father at an early age, farm security guard Chan Sai-Mui (Yumiko Cheng) grew to be an outspoken and determined woman who would do her utmost to protect her home village. It is her sincerity that has won her respect from all villagers of the Leung Choi County. Sometimes she would get too enthusiastic and impulsive that she could bring about a lot of misunderstandings. Amusingly, she has mistaken the newly appointed agricultural magistrate Tse Wong-Sheung (literal meaning "Thank you, Emperor") (Steven Ma) for a thief and the two of them have been bitter enemies ever since. To keep himself from any possible trouble, Sheung has been avoiding Mui intentionally.

For the benefit of his son's future, Sheung's father Tse Chong-Tin (Ha Yu) has not only invited the intelligent Tai Tsung-Man (Wayne Lai) to be Sheung's assistant, but also found him four special bodyguards playfully named Chuk (Congee), Fun (Rice Noodle), Mein (Wheat Noodle), and Fan (Rice). (The names are foods that are the main staple foods of China.) Despite the best arrangements for Sheung, he still gets framed by the corrupted officials from Changsha and is in danger of facing the most torturing punishment. Luckily, Mui and Man manage to save him in the nick of time with a jade bowl bestowed by the former emperor. To everyone's surprise, the jade bowl turns out a fake, but with Man's wit and courage, Sheung is finally saved from danger. Mui has been through a lot together with Sheung and is starting to fall in love with him. Sheung, on the other hand, has no feelings for Mui and decides to turn to Man for tips as to how to break away from her. Mysteriously, Sheung starts being pursued by a hitman soon afterwards.

== Cast ==
=== Main cast ===
Cast	Role	Description
Steven Ma	Tse Wong-Sheung 謝皇上	aka Tse Tung Lui; Agriculture Magistrate → County Magistrate; Chan Sai-Mui's lover.
Ha Yu	Tse Chong-Tin 謝蒼天	Rice Shop Owner; Yau Yuk-Lan's husband. Tse Wong-Sheung's father. Saved the Emperor's life.
Law Koon Lan	Yau Yuk-Lan 游玉蘭	Tse Chong-Tin's wife. Tse Wong-Sheung's mother.
Wayne Lai	Dai Tsung-Man 戴從文	Tse Wong-Sheung's assistant.
Wayne Lai	Dai Tsung-Mo 戴從武	Inspector General of Eight Prefecture and unfilial son. Brother of Dai Tsung-Man.
Yumiko Cheng	Chan Sai-Mui 陳細妹	Constable; Tse Wong-Sheung's lover.

=== Supporting cast ===
Cast	Role	Description
Lee Shing-Cheung	Mak Sui 麥帥	Head Constable
Johnson Lee	Chuk Ching-Tung (Congee) 祝清庭 (粥)	Constable; Tong Shui's lover.
Dai Yiu Ming	Ho Fun (Rice Noodle) 何粉 (粉)	Constable
Li Kai Kit	Yee Mein (Wheat Noodle) 伊麵 (麵)	Constable
Ng Man Seng	Fan Yat (Rice) 范一 (飯)	Constable
Elaine Yiu	Tong Shui 唐水	Song Girl; Chuk Ching-Tung's lover Tong Yi's granddaughter
Mimi Chu	Tong Yi 唐依	Tong Shui's grandmother
Winnie Shum	Xiang Shui 香水	Tong Shui's friend
King Kong Lam	Xiu Yaocheng 徐耀成	Xiang Shui's Boyfriend
Joseph Lee	Tong Dahai 唐大海	Tong Yi's Son; Tong Shui's Father; Villain
Savio Tseung	So Chun Tung 蔬镇東	Inspector of Six Preferences; Magistrate of Wenzhou; Main Villain
Evergreen Mak Cheung-ching	So Tsan-nam 蔬镇南	Advisor to So Chun Tung Dai; Dai Tsung-Man & Dai Tsung-Mo classmates Villain

== Viewership ratings ==
	Week	Episode	Average Points	Peaking Points	References
1	January 21–25, 2008	1 — 5	28	30	
2	January 28 - February 1, 2008	5 — 10	27	31	
3	February 4–8, 2008	11 — 15	25	27	
4	February 11–15, 2008	16 — 20	32	37	

== Awards and nominations ==
TVB Anniversary Awards (Accolades)	Nominees	Results
Best Actor in a Supporting Role	Wayne Lai	Nominated
Best Drama		Nominated
