= The Gentle Crackdown =

Hong Kong television series

- Promo poster
- 秀才遇著兵
- Genre: Costume Comedy
- Starring: Moses Chan; Niki Chow; Wayne Lai; Michelle Yim; Halina Tam
- Opening theme: "明知不知傻痴痴" by Moses Chan & Niki Chow
- Country of origin: Hong Kong
- Original language: Cantonese
- No. of episodes: 20

Production
- Producer: Lau Kar Ho
- Running time: 45 minutes (approx.)

Original release
- Network: TVB
- Release: May 25 – June 21, 2005

Related
- The Gentle Crackdown II (2008)

The Gentle Crackdown (Traditional Chinese: 秀才遇著兵) is a TVB costume comedy series broadcast in May 2005. It stars Moses Chan, Niki Chow, Wayne Lai, Michelle Yim and Halina Tam.

== Synopsis ==
What would happen when a slow-paced scholar meets an impetuous constable? During the Ming Dynasty, the world is full of corrupt officials. Master Constable Luk Chin (Yuen Wah) fell in love with the female outlaw Fei Ying (Michelle Yim) and they have a daughter - Luk Sap-Yee (Niki Chow).

Hoping to follow in her father's footsteps, Sap-Yee is an impulsive and idealistic constable whose skill and competence is often dismissed by her corrupt male peers. Meanwhile, her mother has given up her old ways and keeps her old identity and martial arts skills a secret to watch over her troublesome daughter. When Sui Tong-Lau (Moses Chan), the newly appointed magistrate, arrives in Sap-Yee's city, they wind up working together to solve a number of unusual cases.

== Cast ==
Cast	Role	Description
Moses Chan	Shui Tung-Lau 水東樓	Lower Grade Magistrate; Luk Sap-Yee's lover.
Niki Chow	Luk Sap-Yee 陸拾義	Constable; Shui Tung-Lau's lover. Gam Ying's daughter.
Wayne Lai	Si Kei-Wong 史其旺	Shui Tung-Lau's assistant. Luk Sau-Koo's lover.
Michelle Yim	Gam Ying 金英 and Luk Gam Sze 陸金史 and Sap Yee Ma 拾義媽	Luk Sap-Yee's mother. Luk Chin's wife.
Halina Tam	Luk Sau-Koo 陸秀姑	Si Kei-Wong's lover.
Cindy Au	Man Lai-Gwan 萬麗君	
Lee Shing-Cheung	Yew Dai-Ping 么大平	Head Constable
Johnson Lee (李思捷)	Mok Dai-Mo 莫大毛	Constable. The given name of this constable, along with the other 3, translates to "Making Trouble Out of Nothing" (毛[無]事生非)
Dai Yiu Ming (戴耀明)	Mau See 茅士	Constable
Li Kai Kit (李啟傑)	Sat Fei 實非	Constable
Ng Man Seng (伍文生)	Man Seng 文生	Constable
Mandy Lam (林淑敏)	Chun Fa 春 花	Paid female company.
Yuen Wah	Luk Chin 陸戰	Gam Ying's deceased husband. Luk Sap-Yee's father.
