= The Buddhism Palm Strikes Back =

1993 Hong Kong TV series

- VCD cover art
- 如來神掌再戰江湖
- Genre: Wuxia; Comedy
- Based on: Buddha's Palm by Wong Yuk-long
- Written by: Wong Kwok-fai; Tong Kin-ping
- Directed by: Wong Wai-ming; Yuen Wai-yi; Lee Shu-fun
- Starring: Eddie Kwan; Ada Choi; Elvina Kong; Johnny Ngan; Gordon Liu
- Opening theme: "Buddha's Palm" (如來神掌) by Jacky Cheung
- Ending theme: "Retain the Autumn Colours" (留住秋色) by Jacky Cheung and Vivian Chow
- Composer: Joseph Koo
- Country of origin: Hong Kong
- Original language: Cantonese
- No. of episodes: 20

Production
- Producer: Yau Ka-hung
- Production location: Hong Kong
- Editor: Wong Kwok-fai
- Running time: ≈45 minutes per episode
- Production company: TVB

Original release
- Network: TVB Jade
- Release: 14 June – 9 July 1993

The Buddhism Palm Strikes Back (如來神掌再戰江湖) is a 1993 Hong Kong wuxia comedy television series adapted from the manhua series Buddha's Palm (如來神掌) by Wong Yuk-long. Produced by TVB, it starred Eddie Kwan, Ada Choi, Elvina Kong, Johnny Ngan and Gordon Liu.

== Synopsis ==
The "Buddha's Palm" is the most powerful skill in the jianghu any martial artist can learn. A long time ago, Long Jianfei mastered the skill and used it to defeat his rival Tian Canjiao, and had since retired from the jianghu. Long had not only laid down a rule forbidding his descendants from learning the skill, but also hidden the manual for the skill to prevent it from falling into the wrong hands.

70 years later, a mysterious red-haired martial artist known as Huoyun Xieshen emerges in the jianghu and causes havoc by attacking the five major martial arts schools. The five schools mistakenly believe that Long Jiansheng, a descendant of Long Jianfei, is responsible for the attacks so they turn on him. In fact, Long Jiansheng does not know martial arts and relies on his wit and intelligence to survive. When Huoyun Xieshen hears about Long Jiansheng's background, he starts harassing Long to force him to hand over the "Buddha's Palm" manual.

Long Jiansheng meets Gongsun Lingfeng from the Emei School, and she falls in love with him and follows him on his adventures. At one point, she gives up her virginity to save his life after he is poisoned by Huoyun Xieshen. Long Jiansheng loses his memory after regaining consciousness and meets Feng Qingqing and falls in love with her. However, when he remembers everything, he finds himself caught in a love triangle with Feng Qingqing and Gongsun Lingfeng.

Throughout his adventures, Long Jiansheng learns martial arts from extraordinary people, such as Dongdao Changli. Eventually, he finds the "Buddha's Palm" manual in the old Long family residence and masters the skill, becoming an invincible fighter and defeating Huoyun Xieshen. However, he is unaware that Tian Xiang, a descendant of Tian Canjiao, has been secretly plotting to kill him to avenge her ancestor. Long Jiansheng and Tian Xiang have a final showdown and Long emerges victorious eventually, restoring peace and becoming a respected hero in the jianghu.

== Cast ==
- Eddie Kwan as Long Jiansheng
- Elvina Kong as Gongsun Lingfeng
- Johnny Ngan as Dongdao Changli
- Gordon Liu as Huoyun Xieshen
- Catherine Hung as Feng Qingqing
- Ada Choi as Tian Xiang
- Law Lan as Tian En
- Law Lok-lam as Long Jianfei
- Lo Mang as Tian Canjiao
- Alice Fung as Granny
- Soh Hang-suen as Abbess Jiujue
- Henry Lee as Sikong Jianguan
- Mak Ho-wai as Zhang San

Before: The Yang's Women Warriors: June 11	TVB Jade Second line series 1993; The Buddhism Palm Strikes Back; June 14 - July 9	Next: To Chord the Victory; July 12 -
