= Lau Ka-ho =

Hong Kong television producer

- Born: 22 July 1953 (age 72); Hong Kong
- Spouse: Mui Siu-ching (m. 1981)
- Awards: TVB Anniversary Awards – Best Drama; 2007 Heart of Greed; 2008 Moonlight Resonance

Chinese name
- Traditional Chinese: 劉家豪
- Simplified Chinese: 刘家豪
Transcriptions

Lau Ka-ho (Chinese: 劉家豪, born 22 July 1953) is a Hong Kong producer. In March 2012 he left TVB to sign for Now TV.

== Filmography ==
=== TVB series ===
Year	Title	Awards won	Top 5 nominations
1989	The Justice of Life	unknown	unknown
1992	The Key Man		
1993	The Edge of the Righteousness		
1995	Down Memory Lane		
2005	The Gentle Crackdown	1	3
2005	When Rules Turn Loose		
2007	Heart of Greed	6	14
2007	Devil's Disciples		1
2008	The Gentle Crackdown II	1	3
2008	Moonlight Resonance	6	17
2010	In the Eye of the Beholder		
2010	The Mysteries of Love	2	6
2011	Yes Sir, Sorry Sir		
2012	Three Kingdoms RPG		
2012	Witness Insecurity (TV series)		
2017	Heart and Greed		
