= Lee Shing-cheong =

Hong Kong actor (born 1957/1958)

Lee Shing-cheong 李成昌
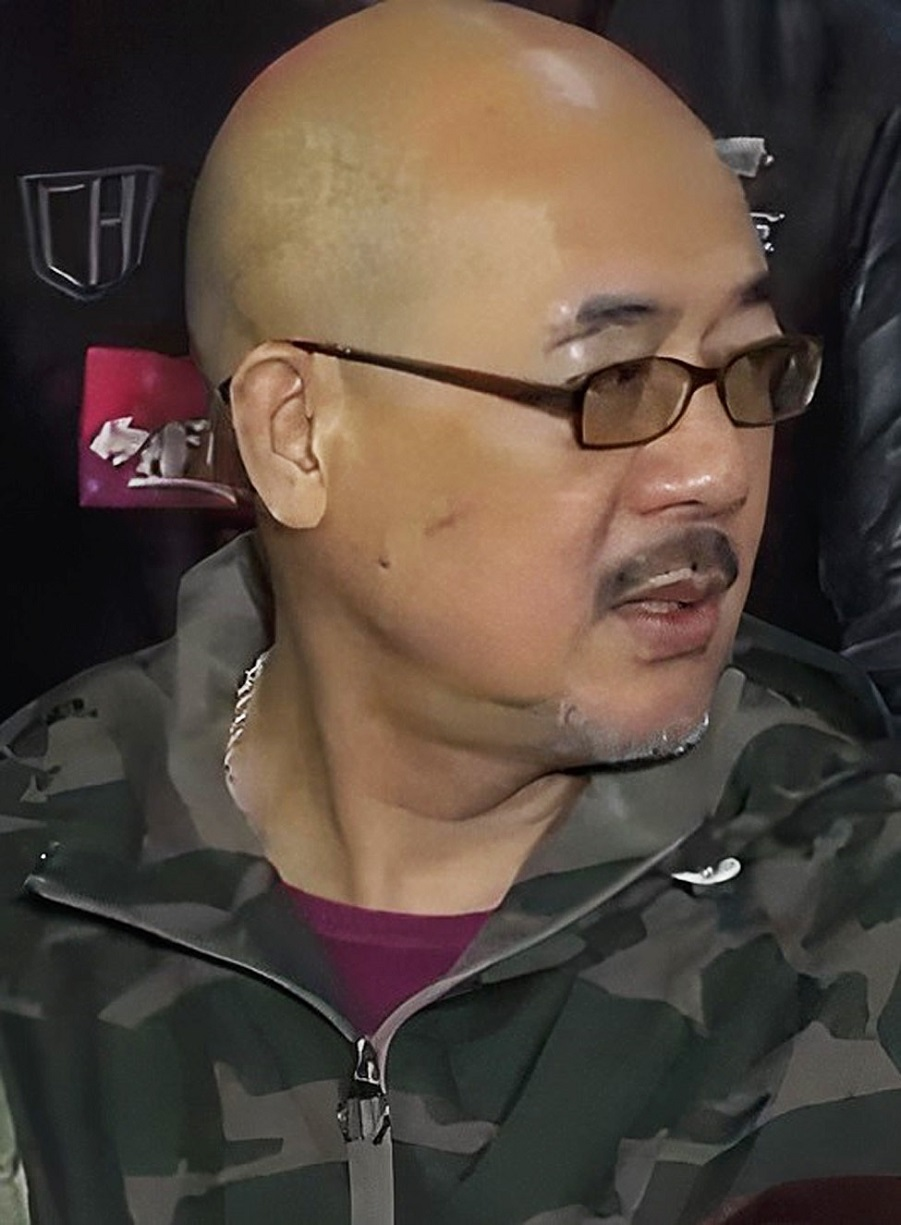
- Lee in January 2019
- Born: 11 October 1957 (age 69); Hong Kong
- Occupation: TVB actor
- Years active: 1979–present
- Awards: TVB Anniversary Awards – Outstanding Artist Award; 2012

Chinese name
Transcriptions
Standard Mandarin
- Hanyu Pinyin: Lǐ Chéngchāng
Yue: Cantonese
- Jyutping: Lei^{5} Sing^{4} Coeng^{1}
- Musical career
- Also known as: Brother Cheong (昌哥), Henry Lee
- Origin: Hong Kong
- Label: TVB

Lee Shing-cheong (Chinese: 李成昌; born 11 October 1957) is a Hong Kong TVB actor. He also goes by the name Henry Lee.

== Career ==
=== Acting ===
Lee graduated from the 8th TVB Training Class in August 1979. He landed his first role in Hong Kong '81, one of TVB's long-running series, and was notable for the role of Michael in Looking Back In Anger, one of TVB's most popular dramas to date.

Lee is also a member of the Hong Kong Performing Artistes Guild. He was inducted on 10 November 1994.

Lee was originally known for playing villains, but gained weight over the years and is now usually known for comedic roles. Lee has acted alongside fellow TVB veteran Elliot Ngok Wah many times, their most notable show being Looking Back in Anger.

=== Personal life ===
Lee lives in Tseung Kwan O with his family. He married his bank officer wife in 1993 and has a daughter, born in 2001.

== Filmography ==
- Hong Kong '81 (1981)
- Hong Kong '82 (1982)
- Hong Kong '83 (1983)
- Hong Kong '84 (1984)
- Hong Kong '85 (1985)
- Hong Kong '86 (1986)
- A Taste of Bachelorhood (1986)
- The Legend of the Book and the Sword (1987)
- Looking Back In Anger (1989)
- Chun Mun Kong Chuen Kei (晋文公傳奇) (1989)
- The Confidence Men (1991)
- Files of Justice Part I (1992)
- Rage and Passion (1992)
- Revelation of the Last Hero (1992)
- Justice, My Foot! (1992)
- Royal Tramp (1992)
- The Bride with White Hair (1993)
- The Buddhism Palm Strikes Back (1993)
- Files of Justice Part II (1993)
- Crime and Passion (1994)
- Instinct (1994)
- Sharpshooters (1994) as 黃進財 Wong Tsun Choi
- The Condor Heroes 95 (1995)
- Files of Justice Part III (1995)
- The Criminal Investigator Part I (1995)
- Corruption Doesn't Pay (1995) as Kan Kwok Piu
- The Romance of the White Hair Maiden (1995)
- The Criminal Investigator Part II (1996)
- Cold Blood, Warm Heart (1996)
- Files of Justice Part IV (1997)
- Demi-Gods and Semi-Devils (1997)
- Time Before Time (1997)
- Justice Sung (1997)
- Detective Investigation Files III (1997)
- Secret of the Heart (1997)
- Armed Reaction (1998)
- Rural Hero (1998)
- Ultra Protection (1999)
- Detective Investigation Files IV (1999)
- Armed Reaction II (2000)
- Armed Reaction III (2001)
- Burning Flame II (2002)
- Take My Word For It (2002)
- Survivor's Law (2003)
- Not Just a Pretty Face (2003)
- The Driving Power (2003)
- Double Crossing (2003)
- To Get Unstuck In Time (2004)
- The War of the In-Laws (2004)
- Armed Reaction IV (2004)
- Scavenger's Paradise (2005)
- The Academy (2005)
- The Gentle Crackdown (2005)
- Revolving Doors Of Vengeance (2005)
- Hidden Treasures (2005)
- Life Made Simple (2005)
- Always Ready (2005)
- When Rules Turn Loose (2005)
- War Of In-Laws (2005)
- Square Pegs (2006)
- Greed Mask (2006)
- Bar Bender (2006)
- Au Revoir Shanghai (2006)
- Men in Pain (2006)
- Love Guaranteed (2006)
- Land of Wealth (2006)
- The Price of Greed (2006)
- Simply Actors (2007)
- The Brink of Law (2007)
- Heavenly In-Laws (2007)
- The Slicing of the Demon (2007)
- War and Destiny (2007)
- Heart of Greed (2007)
- A Change of Destiny (2007)
- On the First Beat (2007)
- Devil's Disciples (2007)
- Fathers and Sons (2007)
- The Building Blocks of Life (2007)
- Burning Flame III (2008)
- The Gentle Crackdown II (2008)
- Catch Me Now (2008)
- Forensic Heroes II (2008)
- Speech of Silence (2008)
- Moonlight Resonance (2008)
- The King of Snooker (2009)
- Rosy Business (2009)
- Burning Flame III (2009)
- Born Rich (2009)
- In the Eye of the Beholder (2010)
- A Fistful of Stances (2010)
- The Mysteries of Love (2010)
- A Pillow Case of Mystery II (2010)
- The Stool Pigeon (2010)
- No Regrets (2010)
- Yes, Sir. Sorry, Sir! (2011)
- The Other Truth (2011)
- Forensic Heroes III (2011)
- Bottled Passion (2011-2012)
- Tiger Cubs (2012)
- Witness Insecurity (2012)
- Three Kingdoms RPG (2012)
- Ghetto Justice II (2012)
- King Maker (2012)
- Divas in Distress (2012)
- A Great Way to Care II (2013)
- Blind Detective (2013)
- Return of the Silver Tongue (2013-2014)
- Ruse of Engagement (2014)
- Rear Mirror (2014)
- Overachievers (2014)
- That Demon Within (2014)
- Noblesse Oblige (2014-2015)
- Madam Cutie On Duty (2015)
- Raising the Bar (2015)
- Little Big Master (2015)
- Limelight Years (2015)
- Captain of Destiny (2015)
- My Dangerous Mafia Retirement Plan (2016)
- Between Love & Desire (2016)
- No Reserve (2016)
- Short End of the Stick (2016)
- Provocateur (2017)
- Another Era (2018)
- Life on the Line (2018)
- The Lady Improper (2019)
- Justice Bao: The First Year (2019)
- On-Lie Game (2020)
- Used Good (2021)
- Communion (2022)
- The Beauty of War (2022)
- Forensic Heroes V (2022)
- Let Me Take Your Pulse (2023)
- No Return (2024)
- Darkside of the Moon (2024)
- The Fading Gold (2025)

== Awards ==
- 2012: MY AOD Favourite Awards 2012
