= Mak Ho Wai =

Hong Kong–Singaporean actor (1946–2022)

- Mak in 1996
- Born: 7 January 1946; Hong Kong
- Died: 14 April 2022 (aged 76); Singapore
- Citizenship: Singapore
- Education: Bachelor's degree in electrical engineering at National Taiwan Ocean University; Master's degree in Chinese language studies at the Beijing Normal University
- Occupation: Actor
- Years active: 1982–2008
- Awards: 1997 Star Awards for Top 10 Most Popular Male Artistes

Chinese name
- Traditional Chinese: 麥皓為
- Simplified Chinese: 麦皓为
- Hanyu Pinyin: Mài Hàowèi
- Jyutping: Mak^{6} Hou^{6} Wai^{4}
- IPA: [mɐk̚˨ hɔw˨.wɐj˩]

Mak Ho Wai (Chinese: 麥皓為; 7 January 1946 – 14 April 2022) was a Singaporean television actor with TVB and then Mediacorp.

== Early life and education ==
Mak studied at the National Taiwan Ocean University, receiving a bachelor's degree in electronic engineering. He later earned a master's degree in Chinese language studies at the Beijing Normal University at the age of 60.

== Career ==
After graduating from National Taiwan Ocean University, Mak was a radio DJ in Taiwan a period of time. Having spent ten years in Taiwan, he was proficient in speaking standard Mandarin.

Mak enrolled into the twelfth cohort of the TVB artiste training class in 1982 to fulfil the wishes of his younger brother, Mak Dai-Shing, who was also an actor with TVB. Mak Dai Shing died in the CAAC Flight 3303 accident in the same year. After completing the training course, he was retained by TVB as an actor, playing mostly a support role in numerous televised drama in the ensuing years. Notable roles during his time at TVB included the head of an investment firm in The Justice of Life in 1989 and a newspaper vendor in The Greed of Man in 1992.

In 1994, Mak played his last acting role with TVB as a prosecutor in Crime and Passion. In September, he moved to Singapore to further his career.

In 1996, Mak played the patriarch of the family featured in the Chinese drama series, Don't Worry Be Happy (敢敢做个开心人). As the drama was popular, with about 68,000 viewers tuning in for its first episode, and 75,000 viewers for its third episode, the moniker used throughout the series, "Old Hero" (老 Hero), would be synonymous with him for the rest of his life.

On 5 October 1997, Mak received the Top 10 Most Popular Male Artistes at the Star Awards. Barely a week later, Mak was part of the Singapore's stage production of Hu-Du-Men (虎度门) that ran between 10 and 14 October. The play was first staged in Hong Kong in the 80s, and it later was adapted into the 1996 Hong Kong film, Hu-Du-Men.

In 2005, Mak had a cameo role in the television series, Destiny (梦在手里), which was the final television role in his acting career.

In 2018, it was reported that Mak had volunteered to be a docent at the National Museum of Singapore.

== Personal life ==
Mak had two daughters.

When Mak moved to Singapore to further his career in September 1994, he brought along his entire family. Previously while still under contract with TVB, he had expressed that he would like to migrate to Singapore due to the living environment and the education system. On 25 May 1997, Mak received his Singapore citizenship.

Mak died on 14 April 2022 in Singapore.

== Filmography ==
=== Television series ===
Year	Title	Role	Notes	Ref.
1983	Return of the Condor Heroes	unnamed Taoist priest		
1984	The Smiling, Proud Wanderer	Tou-bat-yung		
1986	New Heavenly Sword and Dragon Sabre	Chu Yun-cheung		
1987	The Legend of the Book and the Sword			
1988	It's No Heaven 天堂血路			
1988	Twilight of a Nation	Yik-san 奕山		
1989	The Iron Butterfly 特警90			
1989	Looking Back in Anger			
1989	The Justice of Life			
1990	Behind Bars 铁窗雄泪			
1990	Blood of Good and Evil			
1990	It Runs in the Family			
1991	A New Life	Ha Kin-yan 夏健仁		
1992	Rage and Passion	Royal advisor		
1992	The Greed of Man			
1993	The Buddhism Palm Strikes Back	Cheung Sam		
1994	The Legend of the Condor Heroes	Tong Cho-tak		
1994	Crime and Passion		Last work with TVB	
1995	Strange Encounters III			
1995	The Golden Pillow			
1995	Morning Express			
1996	Creative Edge 创意先锋			
1996	Don't Worry Be Happy 敢敢做个开心人	Old Hero		
1996	Ambition	Superintendent Sir 唐Sir	The series is only broadcast by TVB in 1996.	
1997	The Guest People			
1998	The Return of the Condor Heroes (1998)	Zhou Botong		
1998	Legend of the Eight Immortals	Han Zhongli		
2005	Destiny	Cen Fei's father		

=== Film ===
Year	Title	Role	Notes	Ref.
1986	Loves Of The Living Dead	Striptease show's boss		
1988	The Last Conflict	Priest		
1988	The Romancing Star II			
1988	Faithfully Yours	Taxi driver		
1989	All Night Long 夜瘋狂			
1990	Sunshine Friends 笑星撞地球			
1991	The Banquet			
1992	Game Kids 機Boy小子之真假威龍			
1993	Millionaire Cop 千面天王			
1993	My Hero II			
1994	Mr. Sardine 沙甸魚殺人事件			
1995	When a Child Is Born 有兒萬事足	Dr Shen		
1995	Sea Eagle 海岸猎鹰			
1995	Fatal Memory 血案迷情			

== Theatre ==
Year	Title	Role	Notes	Ref.
1997	Hu-Du-Men (虎度门)			

== Awards and nominations ==
Year	Award	Category	Result	Ref.
1997	Star Awards	Top 10 Most Popular Male Artistes	Won	
