= Moses Chan =

- 陳豪
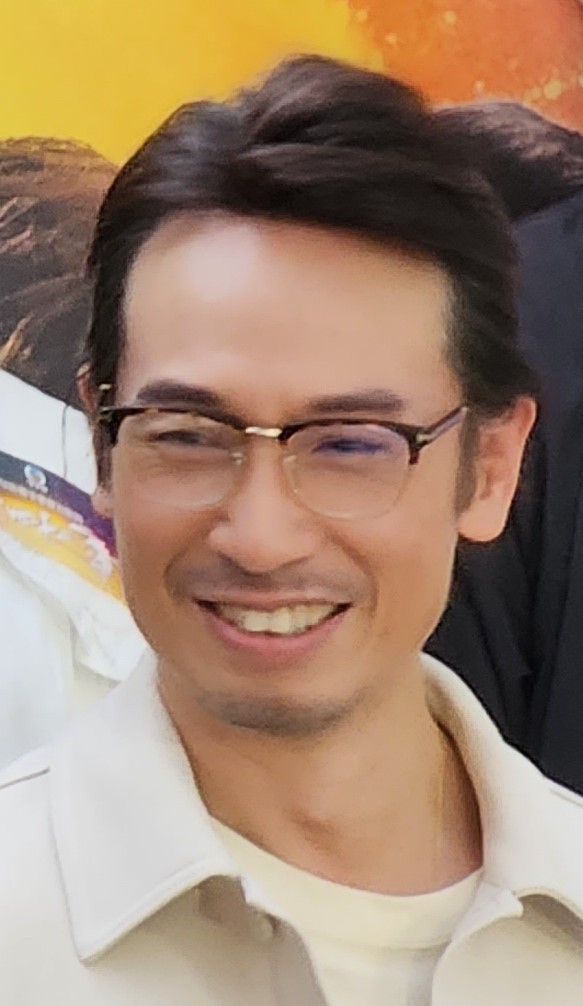
- Chan attending a promotional event for the TVB drama series Treasure of Destiny on 26 February 2023.
- Occupations: Actor; singer; model
- Years active: 1994–present
- Spouse: Aimee Chan (m. 2013)
- Children: 3
- Awards: Asian Television Awards – Best Actor; 2012 When Heaven Burns TVB Anniversary Awards – Best Actor; 2007 Heart of Greed; 2023 Narcotic Heroes; Most Improved Male Artiste; 2002 Where the Legend Begins; My Favourite Television Character; 2004 War and Beauty; My Favourite Male Character; 2007 Heart of Greed

Chinese name
- Traditional Chinese: 陳豪
- Simplified Chinese: 陈豪
Transcriptions
Standard Mandarin
- Hanyu Pinyin: Chén Háo
Yue: Cantonese
- Jyutping: Can4 Hou4
- Musical career
- Also known as: Ah Mo (阿Mo)

Moses Chan Ho (Chinese: 陳豪) is an actor from Hong Kong.

== Career and personal life ==
Chan was a judge in Miss Hong Kong 2007 and Miss Chinese International 2008. Chan married fellow TVB actress Aimee Chan in Paris, France in June 2013. The couple have two sons and one daughter : Aiden Joshua Chan (born 4 December 2013), Nathan Lucas Chan (born 26 February 2015) and Camilla Chan (born 27 April 2016).

In 2017, Moses Chan played the role of gangster boss Victor Ngai Tak-shun in the modern suspense drama Line Walker 2.

== Filmography ==
=== Television dramas ===
Year	Title	Role
2000	Healing Hands II	Lam Man-chi (M.C. Lam)
2001	ICAC Investigators 2001	Chung Fuk-mau (Mau Jai)
2001	Armed Reaction III	Chan Yiu-yeung
2002	Where the Legend Begins	Cao Pi
2002	Family Man	Kelvin Siu
2002	Take My Word For It	Mok Ka-chung
2002	Love and Again	Angus Ying
2003	Back to Square One	Eric Ng
2003	Perish in the Name of Love	Chongzhen Emperor
2003	Better Halves	Ko Fei
2003	Aqua Heroes	渡邊哲修
2003	Riches and Stitches	Siu Chun-hang
2004	War and Beauty	Hung Mo
2004	Split Second	Luk Yiu-kwok
2005	Love Bond	Sit Sui
2005	The Gentle Crackdown	Sui Tung-lau
2005	Healing Hands III	Lam Man-chi (M.C. Lam)
2005	The Charm Beneath	Chuk Yau-yip
2006	The Dance of Passion	Sung Tung-sing
2006	Land of Wealth	Chai Bak-chuen / Fan Chi-chai
2006	The Battle Against Evil	Dan Mo-cheh
2007	Heart of Greed	Tong Chi-on (Duk Duk Dei)
2007	The Ultimate Crime Fighter	Johnlung Wai Tsun-lung
2008	Moonlight Resonance	Kam Wing-ka
2008-2009	The Gem of Life	Terrance Ho Chit Nam
2009	Beyond the Realm of Conscience	Lee Yi
2010	In the Eye of the Beholder	Tong Pak-fu
2010	Fly with Me	Wallace Kan Ming-hin / Wong Kam Bei Lei
2010	Can't Buy Me Love	Kam Dor-luk
2011	Yes, Sir. Sorry, Sir!	Law Yiu-Wah / Law Sir
2011-2012	When Heaven Burns	Angus Sung Yi-Lung (Darkie)
2012	Let It Be Love	Andy Yu Chun-tung
2012	Master of Play	Ivan Cheung Sai-yin / Kan Siu Nam (Sai-yin persona)
2012	The Last Steep Ascent	Miu Tin
2013	Beauty at War	Ko Lau-fei
2013	Will Power	Morris Lee Ming-Yeung
2015	Romantic Repertoire	Moon Sing-hong
2015	Ghost of Relativity	Micheal Mai Hoi-long
2015	Every Step You Take	Kam Yin-chong
2016	Fashion War	Ip Long
2016	Between Love & Desire	Hugo Ngo Pak-yin
2016	My Lover from the Planet Meow	Garfield Sit
2017	Line Walker: The Prelude	Victor Ngai Tak-shun
2017	My Ages Apart	Kwong Kong-sang
2020	Death By Zero	"Zero" Kiu Sing
2020	The Impossible 3	Daniel
2021	Armed Reaction 2021	Hanson Mung Hon-sum
2021	Beauty and the Boss	Matthew Mak Tsz-fung
2021	Flying Tiger 3	Fan Siu-fung
2022	Big White Duel II	Dr. Vincent Lee Man-shun
2023	Treasure of Destiny	Cheung King
2023	Narcotics Heroes	Man Wah
2023	Romeo & Ying Tai	Liang Shan Bo
2024	Big Biz Duel	Chiu Hoi
2025	Love Virtually	
2025	Heroes in White	

=== Film ===
Year	Title	Role	Other notes
1994	Twenty Something	Tom	
1994	In the Heart of Summer	Sam Hui	
1995	Happy Hour	Sing's roommate	
1995	Those Were the Days...	Ko Fei	
1995	Air Hostess		
1995	Heaven Can't Wait	Willies	
1995	Wind Beneath the Wings	Chan Wai-ming	
1995	Enemy Shadow		
1995	The Blade	Iron Head	
1996	The Movie Story	Man	
1996	Tri-Star	Chan Jun-nam	
1996	Young and Dangerous 2	Ko Chit	
1996	Who's the Woman, Who's the Man?	Auditioning gay man	
1996	Lost and Found	Lone	
1996	Black Mask	701 squad member	
1996	God of Gamblers 3: The Early Stage	Soto	
1997	97 Aces Go Places	Yeung's sidekick	
1997	Lawyer Lawyer	Ho Chun	
1997	Intruder	Kwan Fai	
1998	Knock Off	Officer Wong	
1998	Hong Kong Night Club	Ngal	
1998	Casino	Kwok Ho	
1998	PR Girls	Simon	
1999	Four Chef and a Feast		
1999	Gen-X Cops	Superintendent To	
1999	Purple Storm	Rock Chan	
1999	The Mistress	Eric	
1999	The Legend of Speed	Maddie	
1999	Outburst		
2000	Violent Cop	Yuen Wai Hau	
2000	Miles Apart		
2000	Roaring Wheels	Weird Fung	
2001	Everyday is Valentine	Young Master Edward Lee	
2001	Sharp Guns	George	
2001	The Saving Hands	Ho	
2001	Dummy Mommy, Without A Baby	Lawyer Ho	
2003	Double Crossing		TVB film
2005	Dragons Get Angry		
2011	I Love Hong Kong		
2014	Dot 2 Dot		
2016	Line Walker	police superintendent	
2018	Napping Kid		
2022	Breakout Brothers 3		

== Publications ==
- 《給咖啡偷一杯時間》 My Coffee Guide (2009)

Awards and achievements
Asian Television Awards
Preceded by Kevin Cheng for Ghetto Justice	Best Actor in a Leading Role; 2012 for When Heaven Burns	Succeeded by TBD
TVB Anniversary Awards
Preceded by Nick Cheung for Secret of the Heart	Most Improved Actor; 2002 for Where the Legend Begins	Succeeded by Raymond Lam for Survivor's Law
Preceded by Kevin Cheng for Under the Canopy of Love	Best Actor; 2007 for Heart of Greed	Succeeded by Ha Yu for Moonlight Resonance
Preceded by Steven Ma for Safe Guards	My Favourite Male Character; 2007 for Heart of Greed	Succeeded by Raymond Lam for Moonlight Resonance
Preceded by Tavia Yeung	Best Performance of the Year; 2010	Succeeded by vacant
Ming Pao Anniversary Awards
Preceded by Kenneth Chan for Project Ji Xiang	Outstanding Actor in Television; 2002 for Where the Legend Begins	Succeeded by Roger Kwok for Square Pegs
Preceded by Wayne Lai for Rosy Business	Outstanding Actor in Television; 2010 for Can't Buy Me Love	Succeeded by Wayne Lai for No Regrets
Astro Awards
Preceded by Raymond Lam for Twins of Brother	My Favourite TV Actor; 2006 for The Gentle Crackdown	Succeeded by Roger Kwok for Life Made Simple
Preceded by Roger Kwok for Life Made Simple	My Favourite TV Actor; 2008 for Heart of Greed	Succeeded by vacant
Preceded by vacant	My Favourite TV Actor; 2010 for Can't Buy Me Love	Succeeded by Kevin Cheng for Ghetto Justice
