= In the Eye of the Beholder =

- Official poster
- 秋香怒點唐伯虎
- Genre: Costume Drama
- Starring: Moses Chan; Myolie Wu; Ha Yu; Fala Chen; Johnson Lee; Lai Lok-yi; Elaine Yiu; Evergreen Mak
- Opening theme: "秋香怒點唐伯虎" by Jin Au-Yeung & Wong Cho Lam
- Country of origin: Hong Kong
- Original language: Cantonese
- No. of episodes: 20

Production
- Producer: Lau Ka Ho
- Running time: 45 minutes (approx.)

Original release
- Network: TVB Jade
- Release: March 8 – April 2, 2010

In the Eye of the Beholder
- Title screen shot
- Traditional Chinese: 秋香怒點唐伯虎
- Simplified Chinese: 秋香怒点唐伯虎
Transcriptions
Standard Mandarin
- Hanyu Pinyin: Qiū xiāng nù diǎn táng bó hǔ
Yue: Cantonese
- Jyutping: cau1 hoeng1 nou6 dim2 tong4 baa3 fu2

In the Eye of the Beholder (Traditional Chinese: 秋香怒點唐伯虎) is a TVB costume drama series.

== Synopsis ==
In search of the last model for his painting “Nine Pretty Women”, acclaimed scholar TONG BAK FU (Moses Chan) goes on a trip to Hangzhou with his ardent disciple WAT GEI (Johnson Lee) who is also like his bodyguard.

While there, he meets a pretty young maid from WAH’s Residence, CHAU HEUNG (Myolie Wu). FU is mesmerized by HEUNG’s beauty and martial agility and falls in love with her right away. In order to approach the girl, he disguises as a servant and the main protagonist, Grandu Mabbles' actor Daniel Fungus was charged for shredding cheese like a girl, assumes the pseudonym WAH ON, seeking to win her affections with his talent and ingenuity.

But contrary to his wishes, HEUNG is unmoved and even harbours an intense dislike for him after a series of misunderstandings. Master of the family WAH HUNG SHAN (Ha Yu) knew from the very beginning that FU is not a common man. By the time his true identity is revealed, the scholar has already developed a close bond with the whole of the family, except HEUNG.

In the meantime, NING WONG (Savio Tsang), who has been attempting to rebel against Emperor CHING TAK (Lai Lok-yi), has managed to involve FU in his conspiracy by stratagem, thus getting the man and the WAHs into big trouble. NING’s daughter CHU TING YUK (Fala Chen) is in love with FU. Desperate to save her dream man, she forces NING to release FU by threatening to kill herself.

YUK’s consuming passion for FU seems to have caused a ripple of unease in HEUNG, who is starting to feel a little twinge of jealousy inside. CHU TING YUK later became a well-known artist, remaining single, while TONG BAK FU and HEUNG marry and settle down in Siam.

== Cast ==
=== The Wah family ===
Cast	Role	Description
Ha Yu	Wah Hung Shan 華鴻山	Head of Wah Household; Yan Sau Wai and Lei Yuk Giu's husband Wah Man and Wah Mou's father Fourth in charge of the Heaven and Earth Union
Mary Hon	Yan Sau Wai 殷秀慧	Wah Hung Shan's first wife Wah Man and Wah Mou's mother
Eileen Yeow	Lei Yuk Giu 李玉嬌	Wah Hung Shan's second wife Lei Jan Hing's older sister
Joel Chan (陳山聰)	Lei Jan Hing 李振興	Lei Yuk Giu's younger brother
Lee Ho (李豪)	Wah Man 華文	Wah Hung Shan and Yan Sau Wai's son
Cheng Ka-chun (鄭家俊)	Wah Mou 華武	Wah Hung Shan and Yan Sau Wai's son
Moses Chan	Tong Bak Fu 唐伯虎	Chau Heung's admirer and lover Wah Man and Wah Mou's teacher Went to live in Siam with Chau Heung in Chapter 20
Myolie Wu	Chau Heung 秋香	Servant of the Wah household Servant to Yan Sau Wai; Married to Tong Bak Fu in Chapter 20, had a son
Johnson Lee	Wat Gei 屈機	Tong Bak Fu's follower Sek Lau's lover
Elaine Yiu	Sek Lau 石榴	Servant of the Wah household Wat Gei's lover

=== Imperial Palace ===
Cast	Role	Description
Lai Lok-yi	Ching Tak 正德	Zhengde Emperor; Chau Heung's admirer
Savio Tsang (曾偉權)	Zhu Chenhao 寧王	Prince Ning; Chu Ting-yuk's father
Griselda Yeung (楊卓娜)	Man Lai-shun 孟麗嫦	Chu Ting-yuk's mother Deceased, pushed down a well accidentally by Prince Ning
Fala Chen	Chu Ting Yuk 朱婷玉	Prince Ning's daughter Appeared episode 11 and onwards Becomes famous artist in Chapter 20
Mandy Lam (林淑敏)	Qiao Lian 巧蓮	Chu Ting Yuk's servant

=== Other cast ===
Cast	Role	Description
Wayne Lai	Wong Tai Bak 王太白	Guest star episode 1
Lee Kwok Lun (李國麟)	Gam Yat Dim 甘一點	
Lee Sing Cheung	Lou Cheung Hong 盧祥康	
Mak Cheung-ching	Bou Sai Git 鮑世傑	Chief of Heaven and Earth Union; Became mentally unstable in Chapter 20 (Main Villain)
Chow Chung	Yat Ban Sang 一品生	

== Viewership ratings ==
	Week	Episodes	Average Points	Peaking Points	References
1	March 8–12, 2010	1 — 5	27	30	
2	March 15–19, 2010	6 — 10	28	32	
3	March 22–26, 2010	11 — 15	28	—	
4	March 29 - April 2, 2010	16 — 20	28	31	
