= Hidden Treasures (TV series) =

- Official poster
- 翻新大少
- Genre: Modern Drama
- Starring: Bobby Au Yeung; Sonija Kwok; Anne Heung; Wayne Lai; Shirley Yeung; Ellesmere Choi
- Opening theme: "你有寶" by Gigi Leung
- Ending theme: "沒有月亮的日子" by Gigi Leung
- Country of origin: Hong Kong
- Original language: Cantonese
- No. of episodes: 25 (Hong Kong); 30 (Overseas)

Production
- Running time: 45 minutes (approx.)

Original release
- Network: TVB
- Release: September 12 – October 14, 2005

Hidden Treasures (Traditional Chinese: 翻新大少 or also known as 鴨寮街的金蛋) is a TVB modern drama series released overseas in May 2004 and broadcast on TVB Jade Channel in September 2005.

The series takes place in the famous Hong Kong electronics street, Apliu Street.

== Cast ==
Cast	Role	Description
Bobby Au-Yeung	Dai Siu-Leung 戴少良	Ko Sing (高昇) Audio and Speaker Store Owner; Ex-Official of Apliu Street; Cheuk Lam's lover.
Sonija Kwok	Cheuk Lam (Yuki) 卓琳	Movie Scene Designer; Dai Siu-Leung's lover.
Anne Heung	Kwok Lai-Kam (Nicam) 郭麗琴	Second-Hand Store Owner; Dai Siu-Leung's friend. Kwan Bing-Yan's lover.
Wayne Lai	Kwan Bing-Yan 關炳仁	Electronics Repairman; Dai Siu-Leung's friend. Kwok Lai-Kam's lover.
Shirley Yeung	Pang Ka-Yan (Karen) 彭家恩	Assistant; Shing Dai-Ji's lover.
Ellesmere Choi (蔡子健)	Shing Dai-Ji 成大志	Real Estate Agent; Pang Ka-Yan's lover.
Raymond Cho	Li Man-Keung 李民強	
Benz Hui	Kwok Dai-Hoi 郭大海	Kwok Lai-Kam's father.
Eileen Yeow	Ngo Choi-Ling/Cheuk Ling 敖彩寧/卓寧	Deceased Movie Star; Cheuk Lam's older sister. Dai Siu-Leung's ex-lover.

== Viewership ratings ==
	Week	Episode	Average Points	Peaking Points	References
1	September 12–16, 2005	1 — 5	27	—	
2	September 19–23, 2005	6 — 10	29	—	
3	September 26–30, 2005	11 — 15	26	—	
4	October 3–7, 2005	16 — 20	27	—	
5	October 10–14, 2005	21 — 25	28	—	
