= Greed Mask =

- Greed Mask poster
- 謎情家族
- Genre: Modern Suspense
- Starring: Roger Kwok; Christine Ng; Annie Man; Wayne Lai
- Opening theme: "愛的推理"; Andy Hui
- Country of origin: Hong Kong
- Original language: Cantonese
- No. of episodes: 20

Production
- Running time: 45 minutes (approx.)

Original release
- Network: TVB
- Release: January 2 – January 27, 2006

Greed Mask (Traditional Chinese: 謎情家族) is a TVB modern suspense series released overseas in May 2003 and broadcast on TVB Jade Channel in January 2006.

== Synopsis ==
Ko Fung (Roger Kwok)'s girlfriend, Lok Pui-Pui (Halina Tam) pretended to be possessed in order to scam insurance. Fung thinks that Seto Shan (Christine Ng) may be the reason why Pui-Pui is acting delusional but later discovers the real reason. During a car chase with the police, Pui-Pui's car accidentally falls into sea and explodes. Her corpse was never found.

All was put to rest, Fung and Shan started a relationship, however Ko Fung's father, Ko Cheuk-Man (Lo Hoi Pang) was found dead in his house. Fung searches high and low for evidence and finds a secret chamber in his father's bedroom resembling an old factory. He suspects that the murderer must be someone in his household. His cousin Chow Yi-Tung (Annie Man) confessed to the murder but is later found covering for someone else. Man left in his will that Shan would take over the CEO position of his company. Fung starts to think that his girlfriend may be the true murderer...

== Cast ==
Cast	Role	Description
Roger Kwok	Ko Fung 高峰	Seto Shan's Boyfriend. Chow Yi-Tung's cousin. Revealed to be not blood related to Ko Cheuk-Man, he was a replacement as the real baby died in childbirth years before the story take place He actually the son of Ko Cheuk-Man's late ex-business partner was murdered by Szeto Pak Nin who was dealing illegal dealings behind their back.
Christine Ng	Seto Shan 司徒珊	Ko Fung's Girlfriend. Revealed to be an illegitimate child of Ko Cheuk-Man
Annie Man	Chow Yi-Tung 周依彤	Ko Fung's cousin. Step daughter of Cheung Hon-Ming and daughter of Ko Suk Wai; She is deaf She has feelings for Ko Fung that was one sided.
Wayne Lai	Au Man-Wai 歐文偉	Masia Cosmetics employee Friend of Seto Shan; Reveal to be Lok Pui-Pui who have survived the police car chase and went through a trans-gender and plastic surgery to take over Au Man-Wai's identify after killing him. Using Au Man Wai's identify she seeks revenge against Cheung Hon-Ming for ruining her. The real Au Man-Wai was a nothing more a thug. Main Villain
Halina Tam	Lok Pui-Pui 樂珮珮	Ko Fung's ex-girlfriend. Ex-secret lover of Cheung Hon-Ming; Presumed decreased, after revealing trying scam to get insurance benefits from killing Ko fung when her car's brake fails in a police chase, causing her car to crash into the sea where it explodes and her body is never found.
Lo Hoi Pang (盧海鵬)	Ko Cheuk-Man 高卓文	Ko Fung's adopt father Seto Shan's father He died in the beginning of the series due he was murdered. His death was a majior mystery that Ko Fung to try uncover as it has a link to the unsolve mystery the death of his late ex-business partner that was connected by fire in a clothing factory where they work many years ago.
Angie Cheung	Yu Siu Lam 于小琳	Ko Fung's stepmother Ko Cheuk-Man's third wife Chung Ji-Kin's secret lover
Gilbert Lam (林韋辰)	Cheung Hon-Ming 張漢明	Ko Suk Wai's young husband Ex-secret lover of Lok Pui Pui; Plotting to take over Masia Cosmetics Company; Semi-Villain
Edmond So (蘇志威)	Chung Ji-Kin 鍾智堅	Police CID Inspector; Former classmate and good friend of Ko Fung who help him solve mysteries through the series.

== Viewership ratings ==
	Week	Episode	Average Points	Peaking Points	References
1	January 2–6, 2006	1–5	21	—	
2	January 9–13, 2006	6–10	24	—	
3	January 16–20, 2006	11–15	25	—	
4	January 23–27, 2006	16–20	27	—	

== Awards and nominations ==
39th TVB Anniversary Awards

- "Best Drama"
