= The Mysteries of Love =

2010 TVB television series

- Official poster
- 談情說案
- Genre: Modern Drama
- Starring: Raymond Lam; Tavia Yeung; Kenneth Ma; Bernice Liu
- Opening theme: 直到你不找我 by Raymond Lam
- Ending theme: 直到你不找我
- Country of origin: Hong Kong
- Original language: Cantonese
- No. of episodes: 25

Production
- Producer: Lau Kar Ho
- Running time: 45 minutes (approx.)

Original release
- Network: TVB
- Release: 24 May – 25 June 2010

The Mysteries of Love
- Title screen shot
- Traditional Chinese: 談情說案
- Simplified Chinese: 谈情说案
- Literal meaning: "The Mysteries of Love"
Transcriptions
Standard Mandarin
- Hanyu Pinyin: Tán Qíng Shuō An
Yue: Cantonese
- Jyutping: Taam4 Cing4 Syut3 On3

The Mysteries of Love (Chinese: 談情說案; Jyutping: taam4 cing4 syut3 on3; Cantonese Yale: tàahm chìhng syut on) is a 2010 TVB modern series.

== Summary ==
The series is a love story between a professor and a policewoman. Their dating experience is shown alongside the application of physics theories to the investigation of various crime cases.

Kingsley King (Raymond Lam) is regarded as the youngest genius in physics and he is appointed as an associate professor in a Hong Kong university. Invited by his good friend Lo Tin-Hang (Kenneth Ma), Senior Inspector of Police at Regional Crime Unit, Kingsley assists in cracking many mysterious crime cases through his expertise in physics.

During his police work, Kingsley meets policewoman Tsui Siu-Lai (Tavia Yeung) who acts as a liaison with the Regional Crime Unit and Kingsley. The rational Kingsley evaluates that he has fallen in love with Lai because of a neurotransmitter called phenethylamine. However, owing to the huge difference in their family backgrounds and life values, Kingsley fails to tackle their ever-changing relationship problems with formulas. In the end, due to various life changing experiences, Kingsley realizes that love cannot be rationalized and finally admits that his feelings to Siu-Lai are true.

On the other hand, the romantic and uninhibited Lo Tin-Hang has been maintaining a sex only relationship with the journalist Ling Man-Ka (Bernice Liu). Lo Tin-Hang doesn't believe in eternity and he is only looking for sensual pleasure in a woman. However, his belief is suddenly shattered when he learns that Ling Man-Ka is going to get married.

== Cast ==
=== The King family ===
Cast	Role	Description
Lee Kwok Lun (李國麟)	King Yin (Phillip) 景然	Age: 55; Kingsley's father. Cheung Wai Chu's husband. King Chi's elder brother.
Mary Hon	Chueng Wai Chu (Victoria) 蔣慧珠	Kingsley's mother. King Yin's wife. A school principal. king chi's sister in law.
Candy Chiu (趙靜儀)	King Chi (Anastasia) 景緻	Kingsley's aunt. King Yin's younger sister
Raymond Lam	King Pok (Kingsley) 景博	Age: 30; King Yin and Cheung Wai Chu's son. Physics Professor of City University of Hong Kong. Tsui Siu Lai's boyfriend later broke up Because of Kingsleys family then came back.Lo Tin Hang's best friend. A friend of Nickole.

=== The Tsui Family ===
Cast	Role	Description
Law Lok Lam (羅樂林)	Tsui Hon Fei 徐漢飛	Age: 57; Nickname: Fei Sir (飛sir); Retired policeman Tsui Kwok On, Tsui Kwok Leung and Tsui Siu Lai's father. Leung Sau Ngo's husband.
Alice Fung So-bor	Leung Sau Ngo 梁秀娥	Tsui Kwok On, Tsui Kwok Leung and Tsui Siu Lai's mother. Tsui Hon Fei's wife.
Mak Cheung Ching	Tsui Kwok On 徐國安	Age: 33; Tsui Hon Fei and Leung Sau Ngo's first son. Tai Choi Sheung's husband. Tsui Ka Hei's father.
Ng Wai Shan (伍慧珊)	Tai Choi Sheung 戴彩嫦	Tsui Kwok On's wife. Tsui Ka Hei's mother.
Alex Lam	Tsui Kwok Leung 徐國良	Age: 29; Tsui Hon Fei and Leung Sau Ngo's second son.
Tavia Yeung	Tsui Siu Lai 徐小麗	Age: 26; Nickname: Sai Lei Mui (犀利妹); Police Constable; Tsui Hon Fei and Leung Sau Ngo's youngest and only daughter. Kingsley's girlfriend later broke up because of Kingsley's family then came back and became Kingsley's fiancé. Lo Tin Hang's subordinate.
Ng Lok Wang	Tsui Ka Hei 徐家希	Tsui Kwok On and Tai Choi Sheung's son. Good bond with Tsui Siu Lai.

=== Other cast ===
Cast	Role	Description
Kenneth Ma	Lo Tin Hang (Gordon) 盧天恆	Age: 30; Senior Inspector (S.I.P) -> Chief Inspector (C.I.P); Kingsley's best friend Tsui Siu Lai's supervisor. Nickole's lover and later husband
Bernice Liu	Ling Man Ka (Nickole) 凌敏嘉	Age: 26; Lo Tin Hang's lover and later wife. A friend of Kingsley
Lee Shing-Cheung	Man Pak Chu (PC) 文柏柱	Age: 50; Police
Jack Wu	Ko Chi Chim 高子占	Police
Lee Kai Kit (李啟傑)	Fung Hok Ban 馮學斌	Police
Kibby Lau (劉俐)	Rachel	Nickole's friend Seduces Gordon
Jessie Shum	Everlyn	One of Lo Tin Hang's girlfriend
Lisa S.	Kay	One of Lo Tin Hang's girlfriend
Doris Chow (周麗欣)	Cheung Jing Jing (Janet) 鄭晶晶	King Pok's assistant
Lam Shuk Man (林淑敏)	Mary	Police
Raymond Wong Ho-yin	Wong Tze-Ho (Ace) 黃志浩	Guest Star Episode 23-25; Kingsley rival Wong Tze-Bun's Brother (Main Villain)
Johnson Lee	salesman	Guest star episode 1
Angel Chiang	Ida	One of Kingsley's students Episodes 2-3, 9, 15-16, 25
Lo Mang	Chan Gin Sing 陳堅成	Guest star episode 11
Ruco Chan	Wong Tze-Bun (Ben) 黃志斌	Guest star episode 14-15; Wong Tze-Ho's Brother commits suicide in jail (Villain)
Stephen Huynh	Adrian	Ling Man Ka's lover Lo Tin Hang's love rival
Leanne Li	Bowie Choy	Guest star episode 21-25; Admires Kingsley; Tsui Siu Lai's love rival (Villain)
Christine Kuo	Pauline	Guest star episode 25; Tsui Siu Lai's friend
Chloe Yuen (阮兒)	Gym beauty 健身房美女	Gym cameo in Ep.15

== Awards and nominations ==
TVB Anniversary Awards (2010)

- Nominated: Best Drama - Top 5
- Nominated: Best Actor (Raymond Lam) - Top 5
- Nominated: Best Actress (Tavia Yeung) - Top 5
- Nominated: Best Supporting Actor (Kenneth Ma)
- Won: My Favourite Male Character (Raymond Lam)
- Nominated: My Favourite Female Character (Tavia Yeung) - Top 5
- Nominated: Most Improved Actor (Jazz Lam)
- My AOD Favourites 2010 - My Favourite Drama Character
  - Raymond Lam for King Pok/Kingsley - Winner
  - "Tavia Yeung" for Chui Siu Lai - Winner

== Viewership ratings ==
	Week	Episodes	Average Points	Peaking Points	References
1	24–28 May 2010	1 — 5	31	33	
2	31 May–3 June 2010	6 — 9	29	-	
3	7–11 June 2010	10 — 14	30	—	
4	14–18 June 2010	15 — 19	32	36	
5	21–24 June 2010	20 — 25	35	42	
