= Johnson Lee =

Hong Kong actor

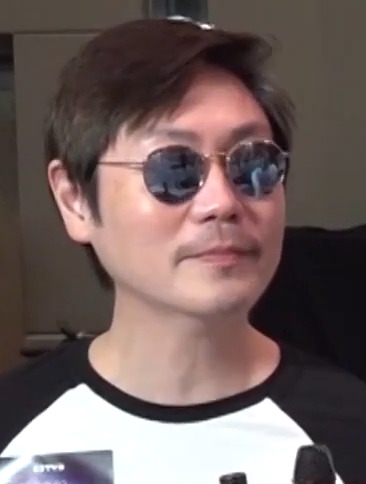
- Lee in 2019
- Born: Lee Sze-chit; 11 April 1974 (age 52); Hong Kong
- Education: University of Toronto
- Occupations: Actor; impressionist
- Years active: 1998 – present
- Awards: TVB Anniversary Awards – Best Presenter; 2010 Fun with Liza and Gods, Asian Academy Creative Awards Grand Final – Best Entertainment Host; 2022 Family Feud

Chinese name
- Chinese: 李思捷
Transcriptions
Standard Mandarin
- Hanyu Pinyin: Lǐ Sījié
Yue: Cantonese
- Jyutping: Lei^{5} Si^{1}-zit^{3}

Johnson Lee (Chinese: 李思捷; born 11 April 1974) is a Hong Kong-Canadian TVB actor and celebrity impersonator.

Born in Hong Kong, Lee immigrated to Canada in 1984 and settled in the Toronto area. He graduated from the University of Toronto and studied animation in Canada before returning to Hong Kong in 1998. He began his entertainment career with Commercial Radio and trained as a comedian. He transitioned to an acting career with TVB in 2003.

Lee is the host and producer of the late night talk show Sze U Tonight (今晚睇李) which began airing on TVB in 2015, and in 2021 became host of Family Feud Hong Kong.

== Filmography ==
=== TV dramas ===
Year	Title	Role	Awards	Notes
2003	Not Just a Pretty Face	Wu Gou Gou		
2004	To Get Unstuck In Time	fast food worker		
2004	Split Second	Gum Yu Loi / Hung Mao		
2004	Angels of Mission	Yiu Ying Biao		
2004	A Handful of Love	Chu Kwok Leung		
2004	Net Deception	Chan Bo-wing		
2005	Just Love	Kot Tak-wan (Vincent)		
2005	The Gentle Crackdown	Mok Dai-mo		
2005	The Gateau Affairs	Mr. Wa		
2005	Into Thin Air	Tsuen		
2006	Under the Canopy of Love	Dai Yut Dou		
2006	When Rules Turn Loose	Hung		
2006	Men in Pain	Rex Kong		
2006	Love Guaranteed	Mr. Cheung		Guest star
2006	Forensic Heroes	Ah Red		Guest star
2006	Welcome To The House	Cheung Yat-moon	Nominated – TVB Award for Best Supporting Actor	
2007	Ten Brothers	Ho Yat Sing		Guest star
2007	Heart of Greed	Wong Ga Wing		Guest Star
2007	Devil's Disciples	Shing Kung	Nominated – TVB Award for Best Supporting Actor; Nominated – TVB Award for Most Improved Actor	
2008	The Gentle Crackdown II	Chuk Ching-tung (Congee)	Nominated – TVB Award for Most Improved Actor	
2008	Catch Me Now	Tam Bun (BT – Ben Tam)	Nominated – TVB Award for Best Supporting Actor; Nominated – TVB Award for Most Improved Actor	
2009	Just Love II	Kot Tak-wan (Vincent)	Nominated – TVB Award for Most Improved Actor	
2009	The Stew of Life	Lee Sing Kei	Nominated – TVB Award for Most Improved Actor	
2010	In the Eye of the Beholder	Wat Gei		
2010	The Mysteries of Love	salesman		Guest star (ep. 1)
2010	Some Day	Ming Nai-keung		
2010	A Pillow Case of Mystery II	Jam Sin	Nominated – TVB Award for Best Supporting Actor (Top 15); Nominated – TVB Award for My Favourite Male Character (Top 15)	
2010	Twilight Investigation	Wong Siu-fu		
2010–2011	Links to Temptation	Shing Wai-yip		
2011	Only You	Fung Yat-chiu		
2011	Super Snoops	Chui Shui	Nominated — TVB Anniversary Award for My Favourite Male Character (Top 15)	
2012	Wish and Switch	Koo Ka-yan		Male Lead
2013	Awfully Lawful	Fish		
2014	Come On, Cousin	Himself		Cameo
2014	Tiger Cubs II	On Tin Ming		
2014–2015	Officer Geomancer	Sit Dan-yan		Male Lead
2015	Smooth Talker	Au Yeung-ai (Chicken)		
2016	Daddy Dearest	Kuk Chi-keung		Male Lead
2019	Girlie Days	Ko Hau Yu / Chan Dai Man		Male Lead

=== Film ===
Year	Title	Role	Notes
1999	King of Comedy	movie director	
2000	2000 A.D.	Greg's friend	aka 2000ad aka 2000 AD
2003	Honesty	Allen Chu	
2003	Fu Bo		
2005	The China's Next Top Princess	Royal teacher	aka Smile of Princess
2006	Cocktail	Michael	
2008	Citizen King		also director, writer, and producer
2009	Turning Point	Ah Chau	
2011	The Fortune Buddies	Lee Chit-sau	
2018	Staycation		
