= Wayne Lai =

Hong Kong actor

Wayne Lai Yiu-Cheung
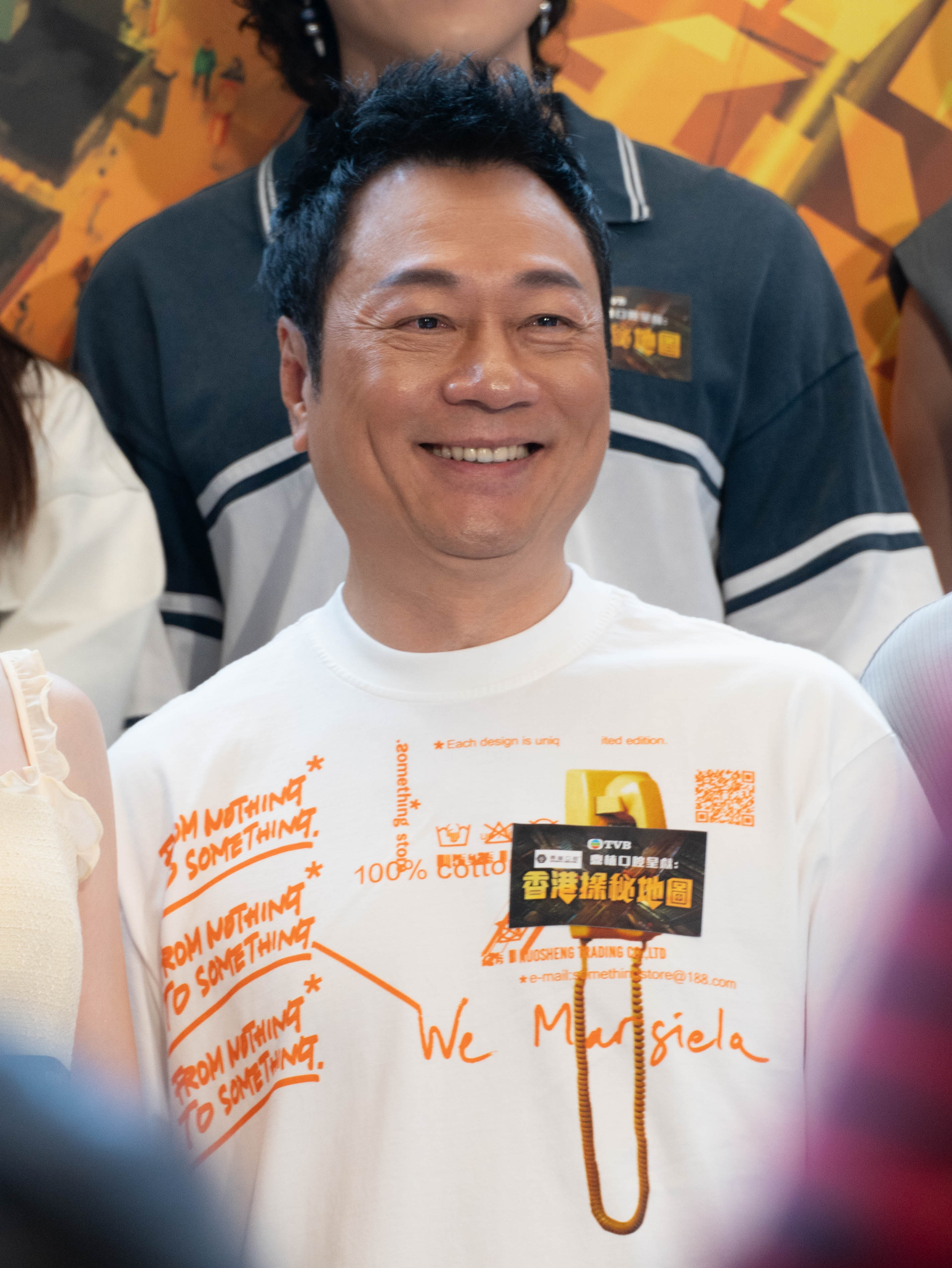
- Lai in 2026
- Born: 4 May 1964 (age 62); British Hong Kong
- Occupations: Actor; comedian
- Years active: 1986–present
- Spouses: Unknown (m. 1992; div. 1993) Julia Leung (m. 1997)
- Children: 1
- Awards: Best Performance – Talent Credits – New York Television Festival; 2010 Rosy Business – Chai Kau; TVB Anniversary Awards – Best Actor; 2009 Rosy Business; 2010 No Regrets; 2012 The Confidant; Best Supporting Actor; 2008 The Gentle Crackdown II; My Favourite Male Character; 2009 Rosy Business; TVB.com's Popularity Award; 2009

Chinese name
Transcriptions
Standard Mandarin
- Hanyu Pinyin: Lí Yàoxiáng
Yue: Cantonese
- Yale Romanization: Làih Yiuh-chèuhng
- Jyutping: Lai4 Jiu6coeng4
- Website: artiste.tvb.com/index.php?m=guest&u=waynelaitvb

Lai Yiu-cheung (Chinese: 黎耀祥; born 4 May 1964), better known as Wayne Lai, is a Hong Kong actor. He became one of Hong Kong's most successful television actors after starring in TVB hit drama series Rosy Business. Lai won three TVB Anniversary Awards for Best Actor, making him only one of three actors who have three wins in that category.

After graduating from TVB artistes' training program, he made his acting debut in 1986, playing supporting roles. He first rose to popularity for his role as Zhu Bajie in the 1996 fantasy drama Journey to the West. In 2008, he won Best Supporting Actor at the TVB Anniversary Awards for his role in The Gentle Crackdown II. His performance as Chai Kau in the period drama Rosy Business received critical acclaim and earned him the TVB Anniversary Award for Best Actor. Lai again won Best Actor at the TVB Anniversary Awards for starring in No Regrets (2010) and The Confidant (2012).

== Life and career ==
Lai was born in Hong Kong and the youngest in his family. His father was a firefighter. When Lai's father retired, his family moved to Kowloon's Shun Lee Estate.

Lai began working at television network TVB in 1983 as a clerk in the administration department. In 1985, he resigned from the position and enrolled in TVB's artistes training program. After completing the program, he joined TVB as an actor. He appeared in various Educational Television programs, in which he played supporting roles. He made his television series debut in the 1986 docu-drama Price of A Green Card (Chinese: 綠卡何價). From 1986 to 1989, Lai played various roles and made appearances as an extra in over 50 drama series.

Lai portrayed Zhou Botong in four Jin Yong television adaptations, including Rage And Passion (1992), The Condor Heroes Return (1993), The Legend of the Condor Heroes 1994, and The Condor Heroes 95.

Lai gained popularity as Zhu Bajie in the commercial success Journey to the West. After starring in Anti-Crime Squad in 1999, he left TVB to pursue opportunities in the film industry. He appeared in the films Bio-Zombie (1998) and Happy Go Lucky (2003), and starred in a few ATV productions after joining the network for a year.

In 2002, unable to earn a steady source of income from film projects, Lai returned to TVB. He starred in the television series Greed Mask, in which Lai portrays a transgender man.

Lai won Best Supporting Actor at the 2008 TVB Anniversary Awards for his role in The Gentle Crackdown II. In 2008, Lai starred in Pages of Treasures, marking his first role as the male lead along with Paul Chun. His breakthrough year was 2009 when Lai portrayed Chai Kau in the critically acclaimed period drama Rosy Business, starring opposite Sheren Tang. His performance was met with overwhelming critical acclaim. Chai Kau became a Hong Kong pop culture icon and spawned the catchphrase "How many decades are in a lifetime?" (Chinese: 人生有幾多個十年?). At the 2009 TVB Anniversary Awards, Lai won Best Actor, My Favourite Male Character, and the TVB.com Popularity Award.

In 2010, Lai once again won Best Actor at the TVB Anniversary Awards for his role Lau Sing in the second installment of Rosy Business, No Regrets, becoming the second actor to win consecutive awards in this category after Gallen Lo who won in 1997 and 1998. Over the years, Lai continues to call the role of Lau Sing as his favourite among all the characters he has played and considers it his representative work. He has stated that No Regrets deeply affected him due to its patriotic theme and that the series is the best drama he has worked on. In 2011, Lai starred in the police procedural Forensic Heroes III as Pro Sir. In 2012, Lai starred as Li Lianying in the palace drama The Confidant. He won Best Actor for the third time at the 2012 TVB Anniversary Awards.

In 2015, Lai made a guest appearance in the drama Master of Destiny, and starred in the period fantasy drama Under the Veil. He portrays Kung Siu San in Lord of Shanghai, starring alongside Anthony Wong and Kent Tong. Lai then starred in the period comedy Short End of the Stick, a series about the lives of eunuchs after the fall of the Qing dynasty. Lai starred in the sitcom Come Home Love: Dinner at 8. In 2016, he starred in a dual role portraying twins in the third installment of the Rosy Business franchise, No Reserve. In 2020, Lai starred in the action drama Death by Zero, portraying the role of an assassin.

== Filmography ==
=== Film ===
Year	Film	Role	Notes
1988	The Final Verdict	Paralegal	Cameo
1994	Mary's Choice		TV movie
1994	The Final Option	Traffic officer	
1997	Killing Me Tenderly		
1997	Troublesome Night 2	Bobby	
1997	Intruder	Chan Kai-ming	
1997	Haunted Karaoke	Chicken Wings	
1997	Armageddon		
1997	Those Were the Days		– Legends of the Condor Heros (1998 film)
1998	A Long and Forgotten Ghost Story	Sze Fu-kwai	
1998	Bio Zombie	Cavity Kui (Kui Gor)	
1998	The Storm Riders	Mud Buddha	
1998	F***/Off		
1998	A Killer's Expiry Date	Cheung Sai-din	
1998	Nightmare Zone		
1999	Gen-X Cops	Inspector Tang	
1999	Fourteen Days Before Suicide	Richard	
1999	The Victim		
2000	Sound from the Dark		
2000	Queen of Kowloon		
2001	Visible Secret		
2001	Strangers Meet on the Way	Man in suit	
2001	The Young Ones		
2001	Vampire Controller	Professor Mo	
2001	Cheung Ngoi Sim Chan Dik Yam Fu		
2002	Frugal Game	Lai Siu-cheung	
2002	Headlines		
2002	The Untold Story: Sudden Vanished	Sam Ko Sam-yeung	
2002	The Untold Story: The Lost World	Sam Ko Sam-yeung	
2002	Money Suckers		
2002	Modern Cinderella	Wu Ah-kau	
2002	Dizzy Date	Sam	
2003	Man in Blues	Jackie Lai	
2003	Looking for Mister Perfect	Grace's Superior Officer	
2003	Happy Go Lucky	Chu Kwok-cheung (Kid Cheung)	
2003	The Assailant		
2004	Escape from Hong Kong Island	police officer	
2005	The House	Kam Kwok-keung	
2006	Dog Bite Dog	Cheung	
2006	Confession of Pain	Chan Wai-keung	
2006	Heavenly Mission	Crazy	
2006	McDull, the Alumni	God of Cooking	
2006	My Name is Fame	Wai	
2006	Love Undercover 3	Gangster Bro	
2006	A Chinese Tall Story	Lizard King	
2007	Hooked on You	Porky	(voice)
2007	Eye in the Sky	thief	
2007	The Detective	Kwan Sai-wing	
2007	House of the Invisibles	Chung	
2007	Loving You Is Wrong		
2009	愛情三結義	department store owner	
2009	Turning Point	Mo	
2009	Up	Dug	Cantonese voice-over
2010	72 Tenants of Prosperity	Astro	Cameo
2010	Despicable Me	Gru	Cantonese voice-over
2010	Forget Me Not		
2011	The Road Less Traveled		
2011	I Love Hong Kong	Wayne Lai	Cameo
2014	The Beggar Hero	Chan Tai-lik	
2016	Sky on Fire		

=== Television dramas ===
Year	Title	Role	Notes
1986	Dharma – Founder of Shaolin		Minor Role/Extra
1986	New Heavenly Sword and Dragon Sabre	Mongol General	Minor Role/Extra
1986	Turn Around and Die		Minor Role/Extra
1986	The Legend of Wong Tai Sin	eunuch	Minor Role/Extra
1986	The Twin Heirs		Minor Role/Extra
1986	Heir to the Throne Is...	Imperial chef	Minor Role/Extra
1986	The Feud of Two Brothers		Minor Role/Extra
1986	The Ordeal Before the Revolution	Yip Man	Minor Role/Extra
1986	Siblings of Vice and Virtue		Minor Role/Extra
1986	Movie Maze		Minor Role/Extra
1987	Beastly Beings		Minor Role/Extra
1987	The Making of a Gentleman		Minor Role/Extra
1987	The Legend of the Book and the Sword	Mang Kin-hung	Minor Role/Extra
1987	The Seasons		Minor Role/Extra
1987	Fate Cast in the Wind	Chuen Fuk	Minor Role/Extra
1987	Born to be a King		Minor Role/Extra
1987	The Greenhorns		Minor Role/Extra
1987	The Dragon Sword		Minor Role/Extra
1987	The Price of Growing Up		Minor Role/Extra
1988	Two Most Honorable Knights		Minor Role/Extra
1988	Twilight of a Nation		Minor Role/Extra
1988	Everybody's Somebody's Favourite	Lam Wai Keung	Minor Role/Extra
1988	The Final Verdict	Raymond	Minor Role/Extra
1988	A Friend in Need		Minor Role/Extra
1988	The In-between		Minor Role/Extra
1988	The Tribulation of Life		Minor Role/Extra
1989	I Love Amy		Minor Role/Extra
1989	The Black Sabre	Drink Seller in Episode 12	Minor Role/Extra
1989	The Shanghai conspiracy		Minor Role/Extra
1989	The Reincarnated of Wai		Minor Role/Extra
1989	The Vixen's Tale		Minor Role/Extra
1989	Mut Toi Tin Sze		Minor Role/Extra
1989	Greed		Minor Role/Extra
1989	Flying Squads		Minor Role/Extra
1989	The Justice of Life	Chung	Minor Role/Extra
1989	Song Bird	Chuk Kwok-ho	Minor Role/Extra
1989–90	Ode to Gallantry		Minor Role/Extra
1990	Three in a Family	Ching Chi-nam	Minor Role/Extra
1990	Blood of Good and Evil	Tai Ha	Minor Role/Extra
1990	A Time of Taste	Choi	Minor Role/Extra
1990	Silken Hands	Hung Ngau-kan	Minor Role/Extra
1990–91	Challenge of Life	Cockroach	Minor Role/Extra
1991	Wong To Yan Ching	Kat Cheung	Minor Role/Extra
1991	Mystery of the Parchment	Beggar in ep 11	Minor Role/Extra
1991	The Black Sabre		Minor Role/Extra
1991	Rainbow	Big D	Minor Role/Extra
1991	Live for Life		
1991	Land of Glory	Kong Kwan-loi	
1991	The Big Family	Chan Foon-yan	
1991–92	Police on the Road	Man	
1991–92	The Survivor	Shek Chi-kei	
1992	The File of Justice	Lee Chi-lap	
1992	Rage and Passion	Chow Pak-tung	
1992	All Men are Brothers	Yeung Siu-chat	
1992	Tales From Beyond		Minor Role
1993	The Vampire Returns	Cheung Nam-king	
1993	The File of Justice II	Andy Hung Chun-tung	
1993	Man of Wisdom	Lee Lin-ying	
1993	All About Tin	Luk Yeh-yin	
1993–1994	The Edge of Righteousness	Peter	Minor Role
1994	The Condor Heroes Return	Chow Pak-tung	
1994	The Last Conquest	Cheung Kei	
1994	Remembrance	Chow Kwok-cheung	
1994	Crime and Passion	Wong Pak-yeung	
1994	The Legend of the Condor Heroes	Chow Pak-tung	
1994	The File of Justice III	Yeung Ping	
1994	Instinct	Lawyer Poon	Minor role
1994	Eternity	Ah Tung	Minor role
1994–95	Filthy Rich	Mo Hak-kan	
1995	To Love with Love	Tang Nai-keung	
1995	From Act to Act	Ho Kwok-po	
1995	The Return of the Condor Heroes	Chow Pak-tung	
1995	The File of Justice IV	Anthony Yau Wing-kin	
1995	Justice Pao II	Wan Hiu-fung	
1995–96	Detective Investigation Files II	Ho Sing-choi	
1996	State of Divinity	Lau Ching-fung	
1996	Nothing to Declare	So Tung	
1996	Journey to the West	Chu Bat-gai	
1996–97	In the Name of Love	Cheung	
1997	Show Time Blues	Lo Chi-choi	
1997	The File of Justice V	Anthony Yau Wing-kin	
1997	A Road and a Will	Ng Kin-ngai	
1997	A Recipe for the Heart	Snake	
1998	A Measure of Love	Lam Wing-ching	
1998	Journey to the West II	Chu Bat-gai	
1999	Anti-Crime Squad	Hoh Fei-fan	
2000	Battlefield Network	Fong Siu-keung	
2000	Showbiz Tycoon	Hoh Chi-cheung	
2000	Hong Kong Yat Ga Yan		
2001	New Legend of Chu Liuxiang	Hu Tiehua	
2001	Su Dong Po	Chan Kwai-sheung	
2002	Law 2002	Lawyer Poon	
2003	Seed of Hope	Liu Chi-kan	
2003	The Driving Power	Lok Kui-kei	
2003	To Love With No Regrets	Yue Koo	
2004	The Conqueror's Story	Hon Shun	
2004	ICAC Investigators 2004		
2005	Bizarre Files		
2005	Scavengers' Paradise	Tse Kwan-min	Nominated – TVB Awards for Best Supporting Actor (Top 5)
2005	The Gentle Crackdown	Sze Kei-wong	
2005	Fantasy Hotel	Hon Shan	
2005	Hidden Treasures	Kwan Bing-hung	
2005–06	When Rules Turn Loose	Hung Chi-tat	
2006	Greed Mask	Au Man-wai	
2006	Safe Guards	Sheung Chung	Nominated – TVB Anniversary Award for Best Supporting Actor (Top 5); Nominated – TVB Anniversary Award for My Favourite Male Character (Top 20); Astro Drama Awards for My Favourite Show Stealer Cast; Astro Drama Award for My Favourite Unforgettable Scene
2006	Trimming Success	Ho Cho-sing	
2007	Best Bet	Tsang Tak-sing	
2007	Devil's Disciples	Tungfong Mo-ngai	
2007	Steps	Lee Lik-keung	Nominated – TVB Anniversary Award for Best Actor (Top 20); Nominated – TVB Anniversary Award for My Favourite Male Character (Top 24)
2007–08	Best Selling Secrets	Yuen Man-cheung	Recurring Role
2008	The Gentle Crackdown II	Tai Chung-man / Tai Chung-mo	TVB Anniversary Award for Best Supporting Actor
2008	Moonlight Resonance	Nin Chi-yung	
2008–09	Pages of Treasures	Fong Sam-ming	
2008–10	Off Pedder	Yue Ka-sing	Sitcom regular Nominated – Ming Pao 42nd Anniversary Award for Outstanding Actor in Television nominated – Nam Fong Sing Din 2011 Annual Television Awards for Most Popular Actor
2009	Rosy Business	Chai Kau	TVB Anniversary Award for Best Actor; TVB Anniversary Award for My Favourite Male Character; TVB Anniversary Award for TVB.com's Popularity Award; Mingpao Magazine Entertainment Award for Most Outstanding Male Artiste; Yahoo! Asia Buzz Award for Most Popular Actor; Next Magazine Award Top 10 Television Artistes
2010	In the Eye of the Beholder	Wong Tai-bak	Guest
2010	Some Day	Simon Ming Sai-on	Sitcom regular
2010	No Regrets	Lau Sing	TVB Anniversary Award for Best Actor; My AOD Favourites Award for My Favourite Drama Character (1 of 10); Ming Pao 43rd Anniversary Award for Outstanding Actor in Television; Next Magazine Award Top 10 Television Artistes; Nominated – TVB Anniversary Award for My Favourite Male Character (Top 5); Nominated – My AOD Favourites Award for My Favourite Actor in a Leading Role
2011	Forensic Heroes III	Dr. Jack "Pro Sir" Po Kwok-tung	My AOD Favourites Award for Favourite Drama Character (1 of 15); Nominated – TVB Anniversary Award for Best Actor (Top 5); Nominated – TVB Anniversary Award for My Favourite Male Character (Top 5)
2012	The Greatness of a Hero	Mo Sing-chi	Previously warehoused; first released overseas in 2009
2012	King Maker	Yu Jing	
2012	The Confidant	Lei Lin-ying	TVB Anniversary Award for Best Actor; Nominated – TVB Anniversary Award for My Favourite Male Character (Top 5)
2013	Bullet Brain	P. Inspector Columbo Ko / Ko Tai-hei	
2013	Will Power	Yu Ying-wai	Nominated - TVB Anniversary Award for My Favourite Male Character (Top 5)
2014	Rear Mirror	Sunday Kei Yat-sing	
2014	Overachievers	Mike Chiang Yuen	Nominated - TVB Anniversary Award for My Favourite Male Character
2015	Master of Destiny	Cho Wan-hon	Guest star
2015	Under the Veil	Chu Yi-Dan/Mr. Lui Yat Pan-Heung's husband (aka Dry Thunder)	
2015	Lord of Shanghai	Kung Siu-san	Nominated - TVB Anniversary Award for Best Actor (Top 5)
2016	Short End of the Stick	Lee Suk-kung	
2016	Come Home Love: Dinner at 8	Koo Hiu-San	Modern Sitcom
2016	No Reserve	Suzuki Kazuo / Kong Sheung-hung	
2018	Daddy Cool	Ho Wing-nin	
2019	Legend of the Phoenix	Lang Kun	First Mainland Chinese Series
2020	Death By Zero	Yim Mo	Nominated - TVB Anniversary Award for Best Actor (Top 5)
2021	The Ringmaster	Shek Ngo-shan	Nominated - TVB Anniversary Award for Best Actor (Top 10); Nominated - TVB Anniversary Award for Most Popular Male Character; Nominated - TVB Anniversary Award for Most Popular Onscreen Partnership (with Winki Lai); Nominated — TVB Anniversary Award for Favourite TVB Actor in Malaysia
2022	Go With The Float	Hung Shap-yat	Nominated - TVB Anniversary Award for Best Actor (Top 10); Nominated - TVB Anniversary Award for Most Popular Male Character; Nominated — TVB Anniversary Award for Favourite TVB Actor in Malaysia
2024	No Return	Chai Sap Cat (柴十七)	
Pre-production	The Father-Son Separation Storm (父離子風暴)		

=== Variety shows ===
Year	Title	Role	Notes
2025	Underworld Travel (江湖見)	co-host	Martial arts classics travel show

== Awards ==
- 2007: Astro Wah Lai Toi "My Favorite Show-Stealer Cast" award for Safe Guards
- 2007: Astro Wah Lai Toi "My Favourite Unforgettable Scene" award for Safe Guards
- 2008: 2008 TVB Anniversary Awards "Best Supporting Actor" award for The Gentle Crackdown II
- 2009: Mingpao Weekly – "Most Outstanding Actor" for Rosy Business
- 2009: TVB 42nd Anniversary "Best Actor" award for Rosy Business
- 2009: TVB 42nd Anniversary "TVB.com Popularity Award"
- 2009: TVB Anniversary Awards "My Favourite Male Character" "Rosy Business"
- 2009: Yahoo! Asia Buzz Awards "TV Actor"
- 2010: Next Magazine Top 10 TV Artiste No. 2
- 2010: TVB Anniversary Awards "Best Actor" award for No Regrets
- 2010: New York Television Festival "Best Performance – Talent Credits" for Rosy Business (Episode 7)
- 2011: Shanghai Television Festival nominated "Best Actor" for No Regrets
- 2011: Mingpao Weekly – "Most Outstanding Actor" for No Regrets

Awards and achievements
TVB Anniversary Awards
Preceded by Ha Yu for Moonlight Resonance	Best Actor; 2009 for Rosy Business	Succeeded by himself for No Regrets
Preceded by himself for Rosy Business	Best Actor; 2010 for No Regrets	Succeeded by Kevin Cheng; Ghetto Justice
Preceded by Kevin Cheng for Ghetto Justice	Best Actor; 2012 for The Confidant	Succeeded by Dayo Wong for Bounty Lady
Preceded by Louis Yuen for Heart of Greed	Best Supporting Actor; 2008 for The Gentle Crackdown	Succeeded by Michael Tse for EU
Preceded by Raymond Lam for Moonlight Resonance	My Favourite Male Character; 2009 for Rosy Business	Succeeded by Raymond Lam for The Mysteries of Love
Preceded by Raymond Lam	TVB.com's Popularity Award; 2009	Succeeded by Raymond Lam
