= Ha Yu (actor) =

Hong Kong actor

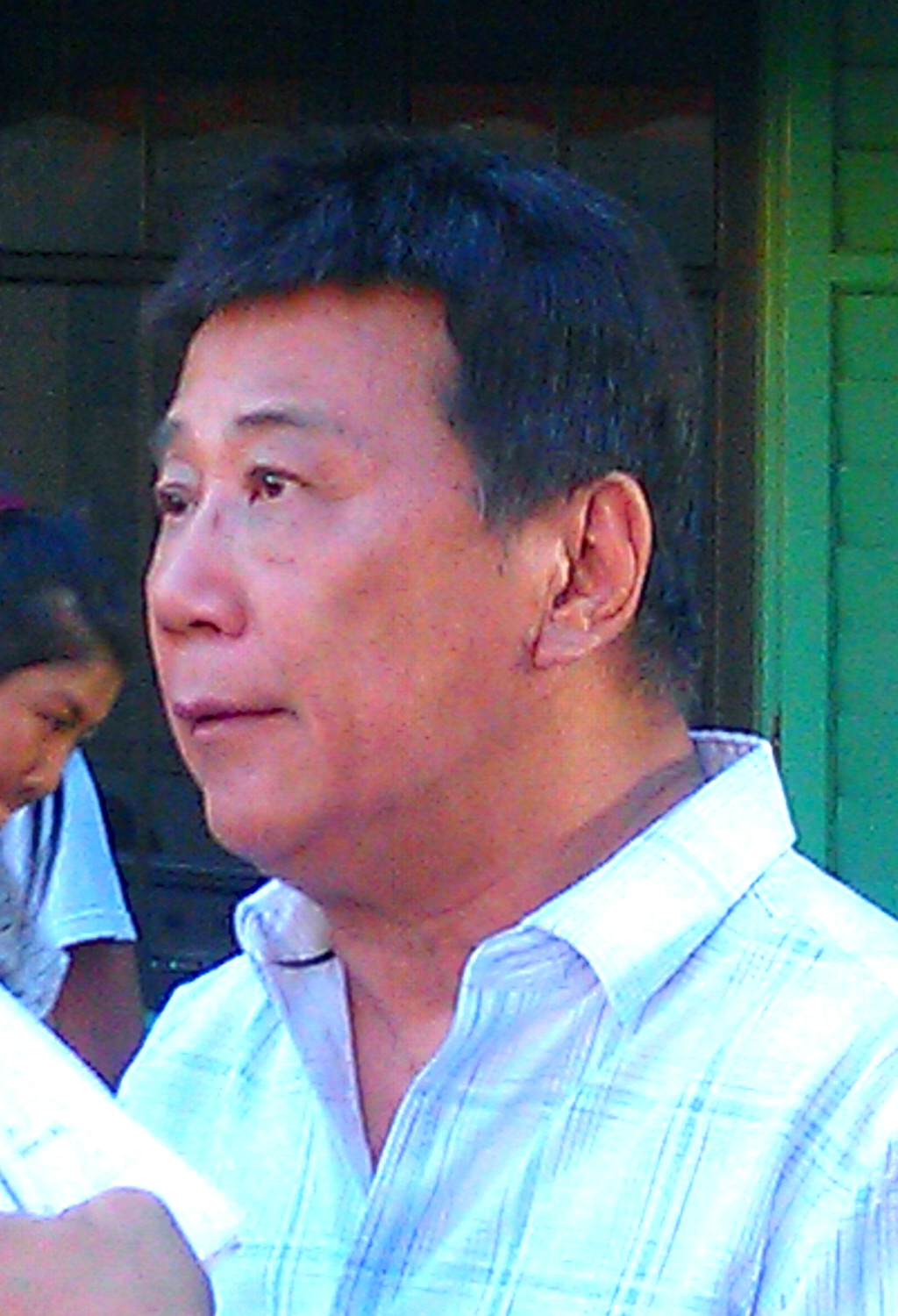
- Ha in 2013
- Born: Wong Sing (黃成); 14 June 1943 (age 83); Guangzhou, Guangdong, China
- Occupation: Actor
- Years active: 1974s–present
- Awards: TVB Anniversary Awards – Best Actor; 2008 Moonlight Resonance; Best Supporting Actor; 2005 My Family

Wong Sing
- Traditional Chinese: 黃成
- Simplified Chinese: 黄成
Transcriptions
Standard Mandarin
- Hanyu Pinyin: Huáng Chéng
Yue: Cantonese
- Jyutping: Wong^{4} Sing^{4}

Ha Yu
- Chinese: 夏雨
Transcriptions
Standard Mandarin
- Hanyu Pinyin: Xià Yǔ
Yue: Cantonese
- Jyutping: Haa^{6} Jyu^{5}

Wong Sing (born 14 June 1943), better known by his stage name Ha Yu, is a Hong Kong actor who has been working on the television network TVB since the 1970s.

== Biography ==
Wong was born in Guangzhou, Guangdong, China, in 1946. He went to Hong Kong in 1962 and worked as a part-time actor during his studies there. Later, he joined the television station Rediffusion (now ATV) as an actor and adopted the stage name "Ha Yu". He switched to another station, TVB, in 1974 and acted in a number of television series produced by TVB, especially in adaptations of wuxia novels by Gu Long. In early 1987, Wong co-hosted the variety show An Evening With the Stars (群斗星會) aired on the Taiwanese television network TTV.

He immigrated to Vancouver, Canada in 1994. During that period, he returned to Hong Kong in 1997 to film for ATV, and in 2000, Wong returned to TVB and acted in some television series again. He won Best Supporting Actor at the 2005 TVB Anniversary Awards for his portrayal of a useless son in the sitcom My Family. In 2007, Wong acted in a few TVB dramas, most notably as "Dai Bau" in Heart of Greed. He won Best Actor at the 2008 TVB Anniversary Awards for his role as "Gam Tai Jo" in Moonlight Resonance. Wong left TVB in 2012.

== Filmography ==
=== Film ===
- The Fun, the Luck & the Tycoon 吉星拱照 (1989)
- Jianghu Dream (1993)
- Love for All Seasons 百年好合 (2003)
- Dragon Reloaded (2005)
- Kung Fu Mahjong 3 雀聖3 (2007)
- The Vampire Who Admires Me 有只僵尸暗恋你(2008)
- Perfect Rivals 美好冤家 (2011)
- ATM 提款機 (2015)

=== TVB series ===
Year	Title	Role	Notes	Ref
1974	Chinese Folklore			
1976	The Legend of the Book and the Sword	Yu Yu-Tung		
1977	A House Is Not a Home	Ha Chun-Yau		
1978	The Heaven Sword and Dragon Saber	Cheung Tsui-San		
1979	Chor Lau-heung	Kei Bing-ngan		
1981	No One Is Innocent	Pau Tsa-Lai		
1981	Young's Female Warrior	Yeung Tsung-Po		
1983	The Legend of the Condor Heroes	Yau Chui-Kai		
1983	The Return of the Condor Heroes	Yau Chui-Kai		
1983	Foon Lok Cheung On	Tong Ming Wong		
1985	The Rough Ride	Tsau Cheung-Yau		
1985	Take Care, Your Highness!	Chow Yau Ching		
1988	My Father's Son	Tang Yan Wai		
1989	Da Sing Siu King			
1989	Yankee Boy	Tsui Wong-Tsoi		
1990	Priceless Adventure	Law Chin-Choi		
1991	The Lady of Iron	Sing Tai-Chi		
1992	Hap Fu Cheung Chin	Ko Cheung		
1992	Ngoi Sang Si Ka Ting	Lau Ming		
2001	Beautiful Life	Lau Lik		
2001	Reaching Out	Lau Lik		
2001	Hope for Sale	Wong Yee-Zai		
2001	Armed Reaction III	Wai Ying-Hung		
2002	Fight for Love	Tsui Bo		
2004	Armed Reaction IV	Wai Ying-Hung		
2004	Hard Fate	Mok Sai-lung		
2005	My Family	Man Chiu-Kit		
2005	When Rules Turn Loose	Shum Yat-On		
2006	Under the Canopy of Love	Ko Pak-Fai		
2007	The Brink of Law	Tong Dai-Hoi		
2007	Heart of Greed	Tong Yan Gai		
2007	Fathers and Sons	Ko Chi-Tim		
2008	The Gentle Crackdown II	Tse Chong-Tin		
2008	Moonlight Resonance	Gam Tai-jo		
2010	In the Eye of the Beholder	Wah Hung-shan		
2010	The Comeback Clan	Dai Koo-tung		
2010-2011	Home Troopers	Chu Kot-ho		
2011	Love Thy Neighbour	Wang Da Fa		
2012	Daddy Good Deeds	Ko Yi-man		
2012	Three Kingdoms RPG	Szema Shun's father		
2013	It's a Wonderful Life	Hao Huixian		
2014	World At Your Feet	Mei Renxin 梅仁信		
2015	Beyond the Rainbow	Tam Kam-shing		
2016	118 II	Li Jinlong		
2017	Heart and Greed	Wong Wing Ching		

== Awards and nominations ==
Year	Organisation	Category	Works	Result	Ref.
2005	TVB Anniversary Award	Best Supporting Actor	My Family (as Man Chiu-Kit)	Won	
2008	TVB Anniversary Award	Best Actor	Moonlight Resonance (as Gam Tai-jo)	Won	
2018	Star Awards	Top 10 Most Popular Male Artistes	—N/a	Nominated	
