= 2010 My AOD Favourites Awards =

- Date: 3 December 2010
- Location: Shangri-La Hotel

Television/radio coverage
- Network: Astro On Demand
- Produced by: Astro, TVBI

The 2010 My AOD Favourites Awards (simplified Chinese: MY AOD我的最爱颁奖典礼2010; traditional Chinese: MY AOD我的最愛頒獎典禮2010), presented by Astro in Malaysia, was an awards ceremony that recognised the best Hong Kong television programmes that had aired on Malaysia's Astro On Demand (AOD) in 2010. It replaced the Astro Wah Lai Toi Drama Awards, which recognised TVB dramas that aired on the Malaysian subscription channel, Astro Wah Lai Toi.

The ceremony was held on 3 December 2010 at the Shangri-La Hotel in Hong Kong.

== Winners and nominees ==
My Favourite Drama Series	
Can't Buy Me Love; A Fistful of Stances; Fly with Me; The Mysteries of Love; Ghost Writer; A Pillow Case of Mystery II; Beauty Knows No Pain; Growing Through Life; Every Move You Make; No Regrets	
My Favourite Actor in a Leading Role	My Favourite Actress in a Leading Role
Moses Chan as Kam Dor-luk in Can't Buy Me Love; Kenneth Ma as Ku Yu-tong in A Fistful of Stances; Kevin Cheng as Ku Yu-cheung / Ku Kin-shing in A Fistful of Stances; Bowie Lam as Ho Cheung-hing in Sisters of Pearl; Steven Ma as Pu Songling in Ghost Writer; Bobby Au-yeung as Sze Sai-lun in A Pillow Case of Mystery II; Raymond Lam as Hanson Hoi in Growing Through Life; Damian Lau as Albert Hoi in Growing Through Life; Bosco Wong as Trevor Ho in Every Move You Make; Wayne Lai as Lau Sing in No Regrets	Charmaine Sheh as Princess Chiu-yeung in Can't Buy Me Love; Myolie Wu as So Fung-nei in A Chip Off the Old Block; Christine Ng as Keung Chin-fung in The Beauty of the Game; Ada Choi as Ling Hau-chi in Fly with Me; Tavia Yeung as Tsui Siu-lai in The Mysteries of Love; Linda Chung as Lau Sam-yu in Ghost Writer; Fala Chen as Ling-gu Siu-chui in Ghost Writer; Jessica Hsuan as Ng Kwan-yau in A Pillow Case of Mystery II; Maggie Cheung Ho-yee as Jackie Sha in Beauty Knows No Pain; Sheren Tang as Cheng Kau-mui in No Regrets
My Favourite Actor in a Supporting Role	My Favourite Actress in a Supporting Role
Ngo Ka-nin as Tong Kat in No Regrets; Derek Kok as Leung Kau-mui in The Season of Fate; David Chiang as Ko Shan-chuen in A Chip Off the Old Block; Michael Tse as Ching Yee in My Better Half; Raymond Cho as Tsui Wing-fai in Fly with Me; Kenny Wong as Yeung Ho-yin in Fly with Me; Joel Chan as Chow Yuk-tsai in Sisters of Pearl; Johnson Lee as the Pillow Spirit in A Pillow Case of Mystery II; Power Chan as Chi Lam in Beauty Knows No Pain; Raymond Wong Ho-yin as Yeung Yeung in No Regrets	Fala Chen as Lau Ching in No Regrets; Gigi Wong as Tam Lan-ching in A Chip Off the Old Block; Sharon Chan as Cally Tong in The Beauty of the Game; Natalie Tong as Ying Ngan-ming in A Fistful of Stances; Joyce Tang as BiBi Yue in Beauty Knows No Pain; Susanna Kwan as Ding Loi-hei in Can't Buy Me Love; Aimee Chan as Perlie Ching in Every Move You Make; Susan Tse as Cheng Long-hei in No Regrets; Kara Hui as Ng Lai-sim in No Regrets; Nancy Wu as Ma Lai-wah in No Regrets
My Favourite Drama Villain	My Top 10 Favourite Drama Characters
Dominic Lam as Wing Tak in A Fistful of Stances	Tavia Yeung as Tsui Siu-lai in The Mysteries of Love; Raymond Lam as Kingsley King in The Mysteries of Love; Steven Ma as Pu Songling in Ghost Writer; Charmaine Sheh as Princess Chiu-yeung in Can't Buy Me Love; Linda Chung as Lau Sam-yu in Ghost Writer; Kevin Cheng as Ku Yu-cheung / Ku Kin-shing in A Fistful of Stances; Wayne Lai as Lau Sing in No Regrets; Kenneth Ma as Ku Yu-tong in Ghost Writer; Moses Chan as Kam Dor-luk in Can't Buy Me Love; Sheren Tang as Cheng Kau-mui in No Regrets
