= King Maker (Hong Kong TV series) =

2012 Hong Kong historical-fiction drama serial

- Promotional poster
- 造王者
- Genre: Historical fiction
- Written by: Ng Siu-tung; Sit Kar-wah
- Starring: Wayne Lai; Kent Cheng; Pierre Ngo; Lai Lok-yi; Kristal Tin; Natalie Tong; Elaine Yiu; Kingdom Yuen; Florence Kwok; Joseph Lee; Patrick Tang; Kwok Fung; Bill Chan; Eric Li; Jack Wu; Vivien Yeo
- Theme music composer: Tang Chi-wai; Yip Siu-chung
- Opening theme: "Dream Chaser" (追夢者) by Leo Ku
- Country of origin: Hong Kong
- Original language: Cantonese
- No. of episodes: 28

Production
- Executive producer: Leung Choi-yuen
- Production location: Hong Kong
- Camera setup: Multi camera
- Running time: 45 minutes (each)
- Production company: TVB

Original release
- Network: Jade; HD Jade
- Release: 13 August – 15 September 2012

Related
- Three Kingdoms RPG; The Last Steep Ascent

King Maker
- Chinese: 造王者
- Literal meaning: "king maker"
Transcriptions
Standard Mandarin
- Hanyu Pinyin: Zào Wáng Zhě
Yue: Cantonese
- Yale Romanization: Jou Wong Je
- Jyutping: Zou6 Wong4 Ze2

King Maker (Chinese: 造王者; Cantonese Yale: jou wong je) is a Hong Kong historical-fiction television drama serial produced by TVB under executive producer Leung Choi-yuen. King Maker started its broadcast on Hong Kong's Jade and HD Jade channels on 13 August 2012.

== Plot ==
Song dynasty's first prince Kwai Sing (Pierre Ngo) and second prince Kwai Wo (Lai Lok-yi) greedily compete for the throne. Yu Jing (Wayne Lai) and Tung Chiu (Kent Cheng) are responsible in advising each prince. Jing and Chiu are old family friends, having a mentor-friend relationship.

Jing's father Yu Pok Man (KK Cheung) brought trouble to the family when his achievements made his advisor feel uneasy. Since then, Jing was separated from his younger brother Yu Tsing (Patrick Tang) and sister Yu Ching (Natalie Tong). Tsing was deceived into becoming an imperial eunuch, while Ching loses her memory, but fortunately triad leader Fan Chiu Lun (Shek Sau) adopts her and triad member Yim Sam Leung (Kristal Tin) takes care of her.

Big villain Yeung Chi San (Joseph Lee) and his sister Consort Wai cause much trouble to get Kwai Wo the throne instead. But, perhaps San and Wai are not the only villains, and there are many others that are much more evil...

== Cast and characters ==
=== Royal court ===
| Name | Actor/actress | Background |
| Emperor Ning-chung (宋寧宗) | Kwok Fung | Emperor; Has health problems beginning from Episode 26 |
| Empress Gung-shuk (恭淑皇后) | Kingdom Yuen | Empress; Mother of Chiu Kwai-sing; Poisoned by Tung Chiu in Episode 27 |
| Consort Wai (慧妃) | Florence Kwok | Mother of Chiu Kwai-wo; Yeung Chi-san's younger sister (Villainess); Exiled in Episode 28 |
| Consort Yee (儀妃) | Rachel Kan | Killed by Tung Chiu in Episode 27 |
| Chiu Kwai-sing (趙貴誠) | Pierre Ngo | Crown Prince; Becomes Emperor in Episode 28 |
| Chiu Kwai-wo (趙貴和) | Lai Lok-yi | Second Prince (Villain); Exiled in Episode 28 |
| Consort Tak (德妃) | Vivien Yeo | Chiu Kwai-sing's wife (Semi-Villain) |
| Fan Hung-ying (樊紅纓) Consort Lai (麗妃) | Natalie Tong | Chiu Kwai-sing's concubine (Further information: #Yu Family) |
| Consort Man (閔妃) | Janet Chow | Chiu Kwai-wo's wife Exiled in Episode 28 |

=== Yu Family ===
| Name | Actor/actress | Background |
| Yu Bok-man (余博文) | KK Cheung | Chancellor; Father of Yu Jing, Yu Tsing, and Yu Ching |
| Yu Jing (余靖) | Wayne Lai | Chancellor, kingmaker Yu Bok-man's eldest son Tung Yuk-kiu's ex-fiancé Loves Yim Sam-leung |
| Sheung Hei (常喜) | Patrick Tang | Born Yu Tsing (余清); Eunuch, Consort Wai's confidant Yu Bok-man's second son Committed Suicide in Episode 26 |
| Fan Hung-ying (樊紅纓) | Natalie Tong | Born Yu Ching (余晴); Yu Bok-man's youngest daughter Chiu Kwai-sing's concubine Becomes Empress in Episode 28 |

=== Tung Family ===
| Name | Actor/actress | Background |
| Tung Chiu (董昭) | Kent Cheng | Chancellor; Father of Yuk-kiu and Ming-hin (Main antagonist); Turns partially insane when a coup d'état attempt of his fails, resulting in his exile |
| Tung Yuk-kiu (董玉喬) | Elaine Yiu | Eldest daughter of Tung Chiu; Yu Jing's ex-fiancé Dies in Episode 28 |
| Tung Ming-hin (董明軒) | Eric Li | Son of Tung Chiu (Villain); Dies in Episode 28 |

=== Fan Family ===
| Name | Actor/actress | Background |
| Fan Chiu-lun (樊照麟) Previously known as Pang Kwok-chu | Shek Sau | Former triad leader (Villain); Dies in Episode 28 |
| Yim Sam-leung (嚴三娘) | Kristal Tin | Triad leader Sacrificed herself to save Yu Jing and died in Episode 24 |
| Fan Hung-ying (樊紅纓) | Natalie Tong | Fan Chiu-lun's adopted daughter Further information: Yu Family |
| (惠 蘭) | Angel Chiang | Fan Hung-ying's personal attendant Introduced in Ep.06 |

=== Yeung Family ===
| Name | Actor/actress | Background |
| Yeung Chi-shan (楊次山) | Joseph Lee | Chancellor (Villain) Executed in Episode 19 |
| Consort Wai (慧妃) | Florence Kwok | Yeung Chi-san's younger sister (Villain); Further information: Royal court |
| Yip Yeuk-mei (葉若媚) | Meini Cheung | Yeung Chi-san's concubine |
| Wan Chi-kwan (溫子君) | Kibby Lau | Yeung Chi-san's concubine |
| Tung Yuk-kiu (董玉喬) | Elaine Yiu | Yeung Chi-san's concubine Further information: Tung Family |
| Yeung Kuk (楊谷) | Sammy Sum | General; Yeung Chi-san's son |

== Production ==
=== Development ===
The drama began in development in early 2011, and announced their intentions to cast Kent Cheng and Wayne Lai, who had previously worked together in Leung Choi-yuen's The Greatness of a Hero in 2008. In June 2011, TVB announced their casting of Cheng and Lai, in which Cheng was willing to reject two other high-paying productions for an opportunity to work with Lai again.

Principal photography began mid-August 2011, following the press conference and costume fitting that was held on 16 August. A blessing ceremony was later held on 21 September 2011.

== Viewership ratings ==
The following is a table that includes a list of the total ratings points based on television viewership.

| Week | Originally Aired | Episodes | Average Points | Peaking Points | References |
|---|---|---|---|---|---|
| 1 | 13–17 August 2012 | 1 — 5 | 27 | — | |
| 2 | 20–24 August 2012 | 6 — 10 | 28 | — | |
| 3 | 27–31 August 2012 | 11 — 15 | 29 | — | |
| 4 | 3–7 September 2012 | 16 — 20 | 31 | 34 | |
| 5 | 10–14 September 2012 | 21 — 25 | 31 | — | |
| 5 | 15 September 2012 | 26 — 28 | 33 | 38 | |

== International Broadcast ==
- Malaysia - 8TV (Malaysia)
