= List of No Regrets episodes =

No Regrets is a Hong Kong television drama that premiered on 18 October 2010 on the TVB Jade channel. Produced by Lee Tim-shing, the drama is a TVB production. The drama is set from the late 1930s Republic of China to the early 1940s Second Sino-Japanese War, centering on the conflicts between an influential triad family, who manages a successful opium production business in Guangzhou, and the city's police force. The two protagonists, drug lord Miss Kau (Sheren Tang) and criminal investigation team captain Lau Sing (Wayne Lai), begin to share a complicated relationship after experiencing various political and emotional setbacks.

== Episodes ==
No.	Title	Directed by	Written by	Original release date
1	"Episode One"	Luk Tin Wah	Story by : Cheung Wah-biu & Chan Ching-yee; Teleplay by : Ng Chun Yu	18 October 2010
In 1984, a mass grave is discovered in Canton (Guangzhou), China. As the bodies are being recovered by workers, an elderly woman and her granddaughter arrive to the site. They are greeted by officials and reporters who know that the elderly woman had been present when the mass grave was first created by the Japanese during their occupation. The elderly woman has flashbacks of the time when Chinese resistors (guerrillas) against the Japanese during the occupation had been shot and buried. She had gunned down one of them herself. Seemingly betrayed by the man she loved, she had told the Japanese that she would collaborate with them if they let her kill the man. Ten years later in 1994, the elderly woman dies. In a church where her funeral is held, people from all over the world return to see her off. One of them, Tong Kat, begins to remember the past. In 1936, villager Tong Kat, nicknamed "Spareribs" (Pierre Ngo) arrives in Guangzhou after gaining a spot in Lau Sing's (Wayne Lai) criminal investigation team. His grandmother sold all her land to the police superintendent, the superior to Leung Fei-fan (Evergreen Mak), in order for him to gain entry and he promises to repay her and be a good policeman. However, Spareribs' weak and timid nature does not leave a good impression on Lau Sing, the two of them are quickly at odds. Meanwhile, drug lord Cheng Long-kwan (Elliot Ngok) successfully secures a smoking license from the government and opens up a public opium den. Seeing that all his businesses are booming, he expresses that he wants to become a large shareholder of the Wing Yip Bank (永業銀行). His eldest daughter Kau Mui (Sheren Tang) promises him that she will be able to persuade the bank's stubborn CEO, Mr. Wu (Lau Kong). She deposits $600,000 into the bank and withdraws the money all at once. Rumours that the bank will go under cause hundreds of people to show up demanding withdrawals. The police including Lau Sing are called to the bank for crowd control. Lau Sing's own worries that the bank will go under causes him to yell at Mr. Wu, who gives in to Kau Mui. Fei-fan receives reports of a robbery-murder case and puts Sing in charge of the operation. After receiving news that the government intends to reward the team with a sum of money after the robbers are caught, he decides to capture the culprits himself, and forces Spareribs to sabotage Sing's well-planned operation.
2	"Episode Two"	Luk Tin Wah	Story by : Cheung Wah-biu & Chan Ching-yee; Teleplay by : Ng Chun Yu	19 October 2010
By the time the operation is over, the robbers are killed by Lau Sing and his team, but Fei-fan takes credit. Sing's police unit is furious but say nothing; yet they all promise that one day they will quit the police force. Dissent is not limited to the police station. In a clear attempt to secure power Kau Mui's youngest brother Cheng Siu-kit (Deno Cheung) requests to take charge of Kau Mui's pakapoo casino in Guangzhou. Their aunt Cheng Long-hei (Susan Tse) proposes that whoever gets the highest votes takes the position. Much to everyone's surprise, Kau Mui gives the last vote to her brother, under a few conditions. Siu-kit agrees. Lau Sing risks his month's savings, giving Spareribs $70 for him to buy a pakapoo lottery ticket. Before Spareribs could buy the ticket, several thieves rob him. Fearful of losing his job and Sing's temper, Spareribs finds an invalid ticket from the previous day in the trash and gives the ticket to Sing. Sing unexpectedly hits the first jackpot of $7778 with the fake ticket, but the lottery company refuses to give him the prize because of Sing's inaccurate copy. Between the gang-run casino members and Sing's police friends, a gunfight nearly breaks out. Kau Mui arrives and finds the real ticket from the previous day matching Sing's ticket, takes her position back from Siu-kit and secures more power for herself in the family power struggle. Siu-kit takes the case to their father, claiming that Kau Mui's conditions had put him in disadvantage, but Long-Kwan dismisses him, saying that Kau Mui had put him to a test and Siu-kit failed. Lau Sing and his gang, furious of Spareribs giving him a fake ticket and losing the chance to win $7778, returns to the police station and angrily confronts Spareribs. Spareribs tries to ask for forgiveness from Lau Sing but he is unforgiving. Spareribs encounters an angry and frustrated Siu-kit who starts harassing a woman. Spareribs recognizes her as Yin-ping (Mandy Lam), the girl who helped him fake the pakapoo ticket. He takes out his gun to warn Siu-kit, but the mob prince is unafraid. A gunshot fires behind Spareribs and fatally wounds Siu-kit. Spareribs is the only one who sees the shooter running off in the darkness. Siu-kit thinks Spareribs shot him and claims so in front of the newly arrived gang members.
3	"Episode Three"	Luk Tin Wah	Story by : Cheung Wah-biu & Chan Ching-yee; Teleplay by : Shek Hoi Ting	20 October 2010
Spareribs flees in horror, knowing that both the gang and police force will be after him. Long-kwan swears to find Spareribs dead or alive. Fei-fan agrees to find and kill Spareribs, but Sing refuses to believe Spareribs to be the killer. When Sing and his subordinates find Spareribs in a hotel owned by the Cheng family, they attempt to help him escape. The hotel happens to be hosting a party for Tung Tai and Kau Mui finds out that Sing knows where Spareribs is. After the family tries to bribe and threaten Sing, Kau Mui tricks him into revealing Spareribs' location. Long Kwan takes out his gun in front of the whole Tung Tai gang, set to execute Spareribs. Placed at gunpoint, Spareribs tearfully thanks Lau Sing for treating him well and trying to save him. Kau Mui suddenly interrupts.
4	"Episode Four"	Chan Yiu Chuen	Story by : Cheung Wah-biu & Chan Ching-yee; Teleplay by : Mak Sai Lung	21 October 2010
Just before Spareribs is to be shot, Kau Mui sees someone who looks like the suspect Sing told her about. She stops her father from executing Spareribs and gives him a chance to identify the killer. Spareribs chooses her suspect - Choi Hing, Siu-kit's accountant. Choi Hing confesses to killing Siu-kit for revenge, because Siu-kit assaulted and intimidated his pregnant wife, driving her to suicide. The gang imprisons Choi Hing. Spareribs finally becomes friends with Sing and moves into the flat he shares with the police team at Chu Lung Lane, owned by Mrs. Yeung (Kara Wai). Long Kwan puts Kau Mui in charge of Choi Hing's case and she lets him go publicly, much to the dismay of Tung Tai's men and the rest of the Cheng family. Lau Sing later sees Choi Hing being kidnapped into a car and follows. Kau Mui "executes" Choi Hing in front of Long Kwan and Lau Sing hears the gunshot, thinking she reneged on her promise. Lau Sing's wife Tung-nei (Elena Kong) returns to Guangzhou and tells Sing that she wants them to move to Macau to help out at her uncle's bread shop, but Sing refuses. His sister Lau Ching, nicknamed Ching Ching (Fala Chen), also returns to Guangzhou after staying in Hong Kong for several months. Yeung Yeung (Raymond Wong Ho-yin) tells her that her brother and wife have been on bad terms because Sing spent most of his income paying for her hospitalisation fees and school tuition in Hong Kong. Feeling grateful, Ching Ching tells them that she's fully healed and she will try her best to earn money to repay them. With Siu-kit's death, Long-kwan's eldest son Siu-hong (Ben Wong) writes a proposal for his father and tells him that he is ready to get back into the business, but Long-kwan, still unwilling to forgive him for his past mistakes, tells him to follow under Kau Mui for now. He reluctantly agrees, but Long-hei is displeased with this arrangement and calls Kau Mui a stealer. Kau Mui points out that she is capable of stealing because her brothers were too weak and unfit for leadership.
5	"Episode Five"	Chan Yiu Chuen	Story by : Cheung Wah-biu & Chan Ching-yee; Teleplay by : Shek Hoi Ting	22 October 2010
Long-hei leads 600 employees to hand in their resignation letters to Kau Mui. Long-kwan learns about it and tells Long-hei to retract her order but she refuses, arguing that Kau Mui is taking everything with the intention of leaving them to ruin. Long-hei has not only forced their men to resign but she has cut off the Cheng family's opium supply. Kau Mui thinks of a way to win; she tells Fei-fan that after the police confiscate illicit opium, she will buy it from them and Fei-fan agrees. The police dedicate their efforts to confiscating opium but Fei-fan interrupts one operation and instructs that only Yeung Yeung, Spareribs, and Lau Sing are to handle the operation alone. The three are almost killed but manage to kill the smugglers. Fei-fan sells all the opium the police confiscated to Kau Mui, but gives only 20% of the money to his men. Fei-fan's subordinates are unhappy with how they are being treated and casually mention how Kau Mui is more honourable but Sing tells them how Kau Mui assassinated Choi Hing even though she had publicly forgiven him and told him to leave China. An eavesdropper rushes to tell Fei-fan that Sing is destroying Kau Mui's reputation and Fei-fan rushes to tell her. When he tells Kau Mui, another eavesdropper hears them and reports to Long-hei. When Sing and his subordinates go to the Cheng family to tell Kau Mui about how Fei-fan is treating them, Long-hei and her men arrive and demands that Sing step out and formally accuse Kau Mui of being dishonorable. Kau Mui also arrives with her men and Fei-fan to demand an explanation from Sing for spreading rumors about her. Sing find himself trapped between two warring mob factions but eventually sides with Kau Mui, creating a fabricated story. Kau Mui discovers Fei Fan's corruption.
6	"Episode Six"	Chan Yiu Chuen	Story by : Cheung Wah Biu & Chan Ching Yee; Teleplay by : Mak Sai Lung	25 October 2010
Kau Mui says she is one who values loyalty and vows that if Fei Fan tries to make things difficult, the police unit can come to her for help. To prove her honour, she forces Fei Fan to pay back the police subordinates with three times the money than promised. The men are delighted that they have been compensated and that Fei Fan has been put down publicly. However, Lau Sing feels unsettled as he cannot figure out what kind of person Kau Mui is. Everybody is curious as to how Kau Mui could follow Lau Sing's fabricated story about Choi Hing so quickly and laughs saying they have similar brainwaves and good chemistry. Later that night, Long Hei and Tai Fung wake Siu Hong. Siu Hong is confused at their actions, protesting that he has early classes tomorrow. Long Hei and Tai Fung bring him to the entrance of a carabet dance club, where they remind him of the old Siu Hong who had killed a gang rival in cold blood at the same spot. Long Hei tells him to become his old self and take charge of the business. Inspired, Siu Hong gathers all the gang members and assigns them a secret task: to find out if Kau Mui is really Long Kwan’s daughter and his sister. This plan backfires as Kau Mui discovers their scheme. She involves Lau Sing in her plot and pays him. With enough money to start a business, Lau Sing and his team quits his job at the police station. Tung Nei visits her grandmother and learns that Fei Fan has bought a wheelchair for her elderly woman. He explains that he is merely being filial to her, and starts to talk about their past affair. Although Tung Nei is touched, she is unwilling to be unfaithful to her husband again. Fei Fan however is determined to make Tung Nei his.
7	"Episode Seven"	Chan Yiu Chuen	Story by : Cheung Wah Biu & Chan Ching Yee; Teleplay by : Ng Chun Yu	26 October 2010
Lau Sing and his unit decide to open a restaurant. Yeung Yeung and Ching Ching grow closer. Kau Mui visits the restaurant and many in the community are willing to help Lau Sing. Unfortunately, a vengeful Fei Fan plots to cause as much trouble in the restaurant as possible, and the business start to loss money, causing further strife between Lau Sing and Tung Nei. Spareribs's grandmother comes for a visit but dies and Lau Sing helps pay the funeral expenses, eventually driving the restaurant to bankruptcy. Lau Sing asks Kau Mui to help him get his old job back and she agrees. Tung Nei also asks Fei Fan to get Lau Sing his job back but he leads her on, forcing her to make repeated visits and lying to her about Lau Sing's poor behaviour and how he had to threaten to resign himself before the police department would take Lau Sing back. In reality, the police chief told Fei Fan to hire him back after a call from Kau Mui. Tung Nei believes Fei Fan's lies. After failing to undermine Kau Mui's position, a defeated Siu Hong dares not meet his family but Long Hei consoles him. Long Kwan announces his decision to send Siu Hong to Shenyang to do business, shocking the rest of the family because it is well known that the city was under Japanese occupation. Despite protests, Long Kwan is unmoved, claiming that Siu Hong's heartlessness would fit perfectly with the Japanese occupiers. Kau Mui is now almost the undisputed heir to the family business, and she is more than pleased about the result.
8	"Episode Eight"	Wong Kwok Keung	Story by : Cheung Wah Biu & Chan Ching Yee; Teleplay by : Man Kin Fai	27 October 2010
Lau Sing tells Tung Nei about how Kau Mui helped him after she believes Fei Fan is the one who got his job back. Lau Sing realises that Tung Nei has been meeting with Fei Fan and the two have another argument. Ching Ching's heart illness returns. Tung Nei rants about her troubles to Fei Fan. She blames Lau Sing for caring about Ching Ching more than her. Tung Nei doubts Lau Sing’s love for her, and says that she does not know how to continue living with him. They eventually continue their affair and Lau Sing finds out. Spareribs vows to help Lau Sing get revenge and runs off to kill Fei Fan. Lau Sing runs after him and accidentally hits Kau Mui’s car. He asks for her help and she watches as Lau Sing drags away a drunk Spareribs.
9	"Episode Nine"	Wong Kwok Keung	Story by : Cheung Wah Biu & Chan Ching Yee; Teleplay by : Shek Hoi Ting	28 October 2010
The doctor tells Ching Ching that she needs surgery in order to mend the hole in her heart. However, the surgery is expensive and chances of success are low. Ching Ching hopes to live the rest of her life happily. Tung Nei files for divorce from Lau Sing. Ching Ching blames herself for the divorce but Yeung Yeung tells her that it is not because of her but because Tung Nei is having an affair. Kau Mui asks Lau Sing to help her on a mission in Hong Kong. She vows to pay for Ching Ching’s medical fees and get revenge on Fei Fan for him. In Hong Kong, Lau Sing discovers that Choi Hing is still alive and working for Kau Mui. Their mission is to rescue Lai Wah (Nancy Wu) from execution after she was falsely accused of murder but Lau Sing does not want to get involved. Kau Mui desperately begs Lau Sing to help and he agrees. They succeed and on the way back to Guangzhou, Lau Sing comforts Kau Mui as she experiences seasickness. Fei Fan leaves the police force and boasts to Lau Sing that he has been recruited by Kau Mui to join Tung Tai. He is made the General Manager and has also announced that he is marrying Tung Nei. Lau Sing accuses Kau Mui of tricking him. Kau Mui chides him for not being caring enough, which was the reason why Tung Nei left him. Two months later, Kau Mui reports to the police force that she wants Fei Fan arrested for stealing from their company. Fei Fan accuses Kau Mui for setting him up by tricking him into investing his savings in stocks and Lau Sing realizes that Kau Mui kept her promise. Fei Fan reveals all his evil deeds as Tung Nei overhears and is arrested.
10	"Episode Ten"	Wong Kwok Keung	Story by : Cheung Wah Biu & Chan Ching Yee; Teleplay by : Man Kin Fai	29 October 2010
Tung Nei leaves Guangzhou. Long Hei finds out that Kau Mui has been meeting Lai Wah at her school. She plants a bug in the dorm and records Kau Mui as she says that she wants to burn all the opium in the warehouse. Long Hei takes the tape to Shanghai for Long Kwan to hear. Kau Mui discovers the bug. Realizing the trouble she's in knowing that her father will kill her for saying those words, she creates an argument with Tai Fung while secretly recording him. She asks Lau Sing for help to fabricate the tape. Lau Sing is shocked and questions who Kau Mui really is after she tells him what she says on the tape. Long Kwan returns after listening to the tape and threatens to kill Kau Mui for her betrayal to the business but Kau Mui shows the tape with Tai Fung and accuses Long Hei of doctoring her tape as well. Lau Sing worries about Kau Mui. Months later, Lau Sing encounters Kau Mui. She brings him to Tung Tai’s opium warehouse and tells him she has a long-kept secret that she wishes to share with him.
11	"Episode Eleven"	Choi Kwok Tai	Story by : Cheung Wah Biu & Chan Ching Yee; Teleplay by : Yeung Suet Yee	1 November 2010
Kau Mui brings Lau Sing to Tung Tai's opium warehouse, and tells him how she was kidnapped by opium dealers when she was 6. She becomes sworn sisters with another girl, Lan Heung, who saves her by allowing her to escape. Years later, Kau Mui finds her hero again, who turns out to be Lai Wah's mother, but discovers that she has become an opium addict. No matter how hard Kau Mui tries to help her quit, she ends up in a vegetative state due to smoke inhalation after she was caught in a fire at an opium den. Kau Mui tells Lau Sing how much she actually hates opium and her plan to close down the family business. She burns down the warehouse and Lau Sing helps her by making the scene look like an accident. Long Hei and Tai Fung try to blame the fire on Kau Mui but Long Kwan believes that it was an accident. Meanwhile, Ching Ching gets caught in a rainstorm as the streets flood. She finds a telephone booth to call Lau Sing and Yeung Yeung but eventually passes out. They find her with a high fever but she recovers over time. Her feelings for Yeung Yeung grow. Kau Mui arranges for Lai Wah to go to Shanghai to keep her safe, but Lai Wah is against it. Kau Mui tells Lau Sing her plan to close down opium dens on the pretext of not being able to borrow any opium after their stock was destroyed in the fire. She goes to Hong Kong to meet with a gang leader to borrow opium knowing that he will refuse the offer since they are enemies. Worried about Kau Mui, Lau Sing applies for leave at the police station to accompany her. She comes back empty-handed and convinces her father to close down 30 opium dens.
12	"Episode Twelve"	Choi Kwok Tai	Story by : Cheung Wah Biu & Chan Ching Yee; Teleplay by : Shek Hoi Ting	2 November 2010
Lai Wah asks Kau Mui not to send her to Shanghai, but Kau Mui refuses as she knows that Lai Wah only wants to stay in Guangzhou to become a singer. Kau Mui points out that the rich men who watch her only want to take advantage of her and don't actually care about her success. Lai Wah's mother, Lan Heung awakens and Kau Mui goes to visit her. Kau Mui promises to take care of Lai Wah as her own to pay her back for saving her as a child. Meanwhile, Lau Sing is worried about Kau Mui after Fei Fan escapes from prison vowing to get revenge on her. Long Kwan goes to Shanghai to get treated for his failing health and leaves Kau Mui in charge. Kau Mui asks Lau Sing for advice and they both agree to close down all of Tung Tai's opium dens. In Shanghai, Lai Wah sneaks out and is catcalled by two Caucasian men but she defends herself by slapping one of the men. The man slaps her back and they leave. Lai Wah falsely claims that she was raped to Kau Mui. Kau Mui is devastated and blames herself in front of Lau Sing. Kau Mui pushes him away by telling him to stay away from people like her. Long Hei and the rest of Tung Tai's employees gather and Kau Mui announces the closure of all opium dens using the excuse that the Japanese have launched a full-scale war on China following the Marco Polo Bridge Incident. Long Hei and her followers object and a fight breaks out between the two sides. Lau Sing shows up and guns are raised. Lau Sing escorts Kau Mui out of the building but notices Fei Fan lurking nearby.
13	"Episode Thirteen"	Choi Kwok Tai	Story by : Cheung Wah Biu & Chan Ching Yee; Teleplay by : Shek Hoi Ting	3 November 2010
Long Hung (Kwok Fung) arrives from Shanghai, and praises Kau Mui for having foresight to shut down the opium dens in order to avoid possible wartime damage and losses. He receives news that Beiping (Beijing) has fallen to the Japanese and they have begun attacking Shanghai. Kau Mui and the rest go to the Shanghai French Concession to fetch Long Kwan back to Guangzhou, but Long Kwan's illness worsens and they convince him to stay. Kau Mui brings Lai Wah back to Guangzhou. Soon after, Guangzhou begins receiving its share of frequent air raids. One day, Ching Ching chanced upon bad weather to go out with Yeung Yeung as the Japanese will not be able to bomb the city under cloudy conditions. She realises that the road ahead of her is very empty and dark days are ahead. As time passes, everyone becomes accustomed to the bombings. One night in May 1938, Kau Mui sees Fei Fan lighting fireworks in the back alley beside her house. At the same time, Lau Sing captures one of Fei Fan's cronies who reveals that Fei Fan ordered him and several others to light fireworks at strategic transport nodes at night [to signal targets for the Japanese bombers]. Kau Mui receives Lau Sing's phone call, and realises that Fei Fan has become a traitor. Kau Mui and Lai-wah flee the house. Out on the street, Lai-wah is injured by shrapnel from an exploding bomb. The duo is found by Lau Sing, who takes them back to Chu Lung Lane to see his neighbour Dr. Wong Luk. Subsequently, the government imposes a three-day curfew on Guangzhou due to traitors like Fei Fan, and Kau Mui and Lai-wah settle down in Chu Lung Lane.
14	"Episode Fourteen"	Choi Kwok Tai	Story by : Cheung Wah Biu & Chan Ching Yee; Teleplay by : Ng Chun Yu	4 November 2010
Kau Mui gets used to living at Chu Lung Lane and the neighbours grow accustomed to her. On the night of May 7th, a series of previous intensive air raids on a strategic part of Guangzhou results in a sudden building collapse. Lau Sing and his team go to help the wounded but an air raid strikes, the women back at Chu Lung Lane grow worried. Kau Mui keeps them calm until Yeung Yeung runs back to let them know everyone is safe. After the curfew is lifted, Kau Mui and Lai Wah return to their home. Lai Wah tells Kau Mui that she is auditioning to star in an international film and asks if she can fund the movie. Kau Mui rejects. Madam Yeung sees the chaotic situation and intends to bring Yeung Yeung back to the countryside. While interrogating Fei Fan, Lau Sing has a close shave with another air raid. He is forced to release a pleading Fei Fan as bombs explode just outside the police station. Guangzhou descends into anarchy as the government evacuates in view of the deteriorating state of the war. Fei Fan and his followers make use of this chance to loot people's homes. He enters Chu Lung Lane and takes Ching Ching hostage. He forces Lau Sing to reveal why Kau Mui always helps him and Lau Sing makes up a story that they are having an affair. Kau Mui shows up with Tung Tai's men and tricks Fei Fan into letting Ching Ching go. Fei Fan and his followers are then tied up and beaten by the neighbourhood.
15	"Episode Fifteen"	Ng Kuen Ching	Story by : Cheung Wah Biu & Chan Ching Yee; Teleplay by : Yeung Suet Yee	5 November 2010
Yeung Yeung explains that he secretly returned after he left a note to his mother. Kau Mui delivers rice and other goods to Chu Lung Lane and Lau Sing gets the neighbourhood together for a final dinner together knowing that the Japanese army is about to occupy the city. Madam Yeung also returns from the countryside to be with his son. Meanwhile, Long Hung, who has been investigating Lai Wah's rape case, tells Kau Mui the real story. Kau Mui returns home and realizes that Lai Wah has snuck out again. She receives a call from Hong Kong letting her know that Lan Heung is in her final stages and sends people out to find Lai Wah so she can speak to her mother on the phone one last time. Kau Mui breaks down as she recalls the time she spent Lan Heung. Hours later, Lai Wah returns but her mother's already passed. On October 21st 1938, Guangzhou falls to the Japanese. Low-flying enemy bombers airdrop propaganda leaflets encouraging the Chinese to support the Greater East Asia Co-Prosperity Sphere. Days after, a troop of Japanese soldiers enter Chu Lung Lane to conduct a population registration. Ching Ching hides in the kitchen. When the Japanese commander, Captain Miyazaki sees the family photo on the wall, he suspects that the missing Ching Ching is part of the anti-Japanese movement. Upon ordering his men to arrest the entire household, Ching Ching comes out of hiding, curses Miyazaki and the Imperial Japanese Army for lying about their propaganda, for their cruelty to the Chinese and feigns a heart attack, causing Miyazaki to leave in a huff, thus saving everyone.
16	"Episode Sixteen"	Ng Kuen Ching	Story by : Cheung Wah Biu & Chan Ching Yee; Teleplay by : Mak Sai Lung	8 November 2010
Kau Mui handles the funeral matter, saying goodbye to her sworn sister and Lai Wah promises to be a responsible person. Lau Sing, Yeung Yeung, and Spareribs are reinstated as police officers as life gets back to normal under Japanese rule. As the police work under the government which is now the Japanese Army, Wong Luk accuses them of being traitors. Yeung Yeung goes to the hospital to restock Ching Ching's heart medication but the supply was destroyed in the bombings. Yeung Yeung encounters Japanese soldiers on the street and is beaten and almost killed when he forgets to bow. Ching Ching worries about Yeung Yeung when he bikes to Foshan to get medication for her. He returns safely. When Lau Sing and the rest of the police force return to their jobs, they realize that the Japanese Army is forcing them to capture guerillas. Japanese soldiers arrive and their commander, Mukaiyama Tetsuya (King Kong) asks Lau Sing to show him his shooting skills. Lau Sing successfully negotiates with him and asks for rice and if he can let the police force do regular work rather than being involved with capturing guerillas. Kau Mui meets Lau Sing, and says that the Japanese commander has expressed interest in opening opium dens with the Cheng family. Lau Sing tells her to leave the country rather than get involved. Kau Mui brings Lai Wah to live at Chu Lung Lane for her safety. Ching Ching cuts her hair like a boy to avoid getting raped by Japanese soldiers. The people at Chu Lung Lane tell Lai Wah to do the same but she refuses and sneaks out. Lai Wah gets caught by Japanese soldiers and is almost raped, but she fakes an infectious illness and tells them the location of Ching Ching, sending them away. The Japanese soldiers show up at Chu Lung Lane to take Ching Ching away but Yeung Yeung tells them that he and Ching Ching's brother, Lau Sing are friends with their commander, sending the soldiers away. Madam Yeung passes out.
17	"Episode Seventeen"	Ng Kuen Chun	Story by : Cheung Wah Biu & Chan Ching Yee; Teleplay by : Shek Hoi Ting	9 November 2010
Kau Mui comes for a visit and drives Madam Yeung to the hospital. Ching Ching visits a herb shop and the owner tells her that he saw Japanese soldiers taking Lai Wah into an alley before they ran up to Chu Lung Lane. Kau Mui comes over for dinner and Ching Ching reveals what the owner saw. Lai Wah once again brings up her fabricated story about her rape in Shanghai before Kau Mui reveals that she investigated and calls her out on the lie. They kick Lai Wah out but she begs to be let back in. She promises Kau Mui to be a good person. Tetsuya goes to Kau Mui's office at Tung Tai, and they discuss about the opening of new opium dens. He tells her that he will give her five exit permits to leave Guangzhou for Hong Kong. Kau Mui meets Lau Sing, and says that she will give him and his neighbours the five permits. Wong Luk and his wife encounter Japanese soldiers and she is severely beaten for accidentally stepping on a piece of newspaper that happened to have the Japanese flag on it. When they return to Chu Lung Lane, everyone argues for a permit to leave. Kau Mui tries to negotiate for a 50/50 partnership with Tetsuya but fails. She apologizes to Lau Sing for not being able to get the five permits but promises to get them back. Lau Sing quarrels with her and tells her to leave for Honolulu but she tells him that if she doesn't open the opium dens, someone else will and the situation would be much worse. If she chooses to do it, she will still have control and be able to negotiate with the Japanese Army. Lau Sing gives her an ultimatum, telling her that they cannot be friends if she works with the Japanese Army. Kau Mui goes to Tetsuya, desperate for the permits. He throws her one. The people at Chu Lung Lane decide that Ching Ching should be the one to leave since Hong Kong will have medication and treatment for her heart disease. Ching Ching boards the train but runs home after saying that she would rather be with everyone than be alone. Fei Fan, now a traitor working for the Japanese Army, is reinstated as a police officer. Kau Mui eventually accepts Tetsuya's business terms and officiates the opening of the opium den with the Japanese Army. During the press conference, somebody throws an egg at Kau Mui and accuses her of being a traitor.
18	"Episode Eighteen"	Ng Kuen Chun	Story by : Cheung Wah Biu & Chan Ching Yee; Teleplay by : Yeung Suet Yee	10 November 2010
The Japanese soldiers capture and kill the person in front of everyone. Kau Mui tells Lau Sing that the Japanese plans to send 500 orphans from Guangzhou to the harsh conditions in the northeast and if she continues opening opium dens, she can get enough exit permits for them to safely leave for Hong Kong or Macau. Lau Sing reminds Kau Mui to think of herself and her own reputation, as the entire city is calling her a traitor but she asks him if he has another way to save the children. He chooses to help her and together, they arrive at the orphanage to help the orphans board the train for Hong Kong. Long Kwan suddenly returns from Shanghai and asks why Kau Mui is collaborating with the Japanese. He accuses her of being a traitor and making him a traitor as well. A friend from Honolulu delivers a present for Long Kwan's birthday but is intercepted by Long Hei. She replaces the gift with a fake bomb and papers inside with the word 'traitor'. When Long Kwan opens the present at his party, he is shocked and upset. The police force, now under Fei Fan, captures a guerilla unknowingly. Spareribs tells Lau Sing that he overheard Fei Fan say he is releasing the guerrilla and that he will finally get his revenge. Lau Sing interrogates Fei Fan's subordinate and finds out the guerrillas are planning an assassination attempt on Kau Mui. Lau Sing rushes to the opening of an opium den and jumps on stage to save Kau Mui but gets shot himself. The Japanese Army takes Kau Mui away from the scene but she hurries back to send Lau Sing to the hospital. Ching Ching's heart condition causes her to faint while running to the hospital to see her brother but everybody avoids telling Lau Sing fearing of aggravating his condition. Days later, Lau Sing asks Kau Mui and she reveals to him about Lau Ching's illness relapsing. Lau Sing then blames himself for constantly trying to be a hero by helping her. Kau Mui realizes the pain she caused him and can't bear to drag him down with her. She tells him that they should no longer be friends and breaks off all contact with him.
19	"Episode Nineteen"	Fong Chun Chiu	Story by : Cheung Wah Biu & Chan Ching Yee; Teleplay by : Mak Sai Lung	11 November 2010
Lau Sing reminds Kau Mui to think about her own wellbeing instead of only thinking of others before she leaves. Fei Fan helps Long Hei meet up with Tetsuya, where she plays him the tape of Kau Mui saying she wants to burn all opium. Kau Mui receives news that Tetsuya is coming for her so she smokes opium to drown his suspicion, telling him that the tape is fabricated and that she smokes opium everyday. The soldiers spy on her daily for months and it doesn't take long for her to become addicted. Months later, Ching Ching is well enough to leave the hospital. Lau Sing encounters Tetsuya who invites him to a shooting contest using wooden bullets. He declines using the excuse that he is still healing from being shot. Lau Sing often passes by Tung Tai, worried about Kau Mui. One day, Kau Mui calls him out of desperation but hangs up before saying anything. Lau Sing waits for her at Tung Tai and is shocked to find her smoking opium. She tells him that she's trying to quit and tells him to stay away from her. A woman married to a guerrilla comes to Tung Tai to meet with Kau Mui after she hears a rumour that she has been helping children escape. She asks Kau Mui to give her son a permit to Hong Kong. Fei Fan finds this permit in the child's bag at a hideout with Kau Mui's name as the guarantor. Kau Mui, not realizing the mother and son already escaped, tries to negotiate with Fei Fan but he threatens her by recording her and asks for 100 permits which were supposed to go to orphan children. She has no choice but to give him the permits for him to sell. Lau Sing waits for Kau Mui at Tung Tai and takes her to the church they always meet at to help her kick her addiction but he fails to hold her back. Before she leaves, she tells him about Fei Fan's threat. Lau Sing goes to Tetsuya and takes him up on his invite for a shooting contest. He gets shot by wooden bullets and arrives at Fei Fan's house showing his wounds. He lies to Fei Fan, holding him at gunpoint saying that he is forced to compete again using real bullets next time and that since he was going to die, he will take Fei Fan with him. A fearful Fei Fan gives him all 100 permits. Lau Sing finds a struggling Kau Mui at the church about to leave and returns the permits to her. She tries to leave, unable to control her opium withdrawal but Lau Sing stops her.
20	"Episode Twenty"	Fong Chun Chiu	Story by : Cheung Wah Biu & Chan Ching Yee; Teleplay by : Shek Hoi Ting	12 November 2010
Lau Sing accompanies Kau Mui for the whole night and they continue to meet at the church until her symptoms disappear completely. Kau Mui finds out that the 2 Japanese commanders, Tetsuya and Takamori, are fighting amongst each other. Kau Mui finds a way to stop Takamori from harassing her and continually checking on her smoking opium. However, Long Hei convinces Takamori to come to their house in attempt to drive a wedge between Long Kwan and Kau Mui. She is successful when Long Kwan gets slapped twice by Takamori and blames Kau Mui, threatening to revoke their father-daughter relationship. Kau Mui, hated by her whole family, relapses into smoking opium as a coping mechanism while avoiding Lau Sing's calls. Kau Mui visits Chu Lung Lane one night and Lau Sing follows her to find her smoking opium again. Kau Mui forces him to leave not wanting him to see her in her condition and Lau Sing realizes that he cannot simply force her to quit. Kau Mui notices Lau Sing every night waiting for her outside of Tung Tai. Lau Sing goes to Long Kwan and lectures him of being a narcissist, only caring about his own reputation while his daughter takes all the shame of being a traitor in the public eye. He tells Long Kwan about Kau Mui's opium addiction, which shocks him. Long Kwan tells Kau Mui that Lau Sing is right and that she should think about her own wellbeing. Kau Mui makes the decision to quit for good and Lau Sing once again helps her kick the addiction. Takamori is furious with Tetsuya after he is given a lesson for slandering Tetsuya's father. He encounters Spareribs on the street and tells him in Japanese to take off his hat when he bows. Spareribs doesn't understand and is nearly beaten to death by Takamori. Kau Mui arrives at Chu Lung Lane to see the aftermath and vows to get revenge. They send him to the hospital. Lau Sing worries for Kau Mui after seeing her car outside a Japanese restaurant. Kau Mui dines with Takamori and pretends to have been assaulted by him. She falsely tells Tetsuya about Takamori's plan to defame his father publicly in front of the press when they return to Japan. She pretends to attempt suicide and Tetsuya tells her to kill him without consequences. Lau Sing is scared to death when he hears gunshots ring out. He is relieved and impressed when he sees Kau Mui come out of the restaurant.
21	"Episode Twenty-one"	Fong Chun Chiu	Story by : Cheung Wah Biu & Chan Ching Yee; Teleplay by : Yeung Suet Yee	15 November 2010
Long Kwan feels pleased when Kau Mui tells him what happened to Takamori. It was reported that Takamori was killed by guerrillas but Lau Sing, knowing the true story, tells his neighbours not to worry, knowing the Japanese Army will not investigate. Kau Mui asks Lai Wah, now a nurse, to monitor Long Kwan's health. The Chu Lung Lane neighbours find out about the Attack on Pearl Harbor. With the United States now joining the Pacific War against the Japanese, Kau Mui and Lau Sing discuss if the Allies along with the Americans will send planes to bomb places under Japanese rule, such as Guangzhou. They decide on a meeting place, the church they often meet at, in case they ever get separated. Yeung Yeung secretly sets up a place for Ching Ching away from the city as a hideout. Spareribs practices and perfects his shooting skills. Fei Fan questions if Lau Sing was previously lying to him about competing with Tetsuya. He warns Tetsuya about Lau Sing and Kau Mui but Spareribs overhears. Spareribs prepares to take Lau Sing's place at competing with Tetsuya with real bullets and writes a will. Lau Sing tells him that Kau Mui already has a plan. Tetsuya tells Lau Sing that he will not ask him to compete due to Ching Ching's illness. He also says Spareribs is not good enough to compete with him but asks him to show off his skills using an apple which is placed on top of Fei Fan's head. Fei Fan urinates himself out of fear as Spareribs pretends to have bad aim. He successfully shoots the apple. Fei Fan attacks him afterward before Kau Mui intervenes, scaring Fei Fan and his followers away.
22	"Episode Twenty-two"	Fong Chun Chiu	Story by : Cheung Wah Biu & Chan Ching Yee; Teleplay by : Ng Chun Yu	16 November 2010
Kau Mui informs Lau Sing that there have been attacks on Tokyo. Chinese planes return and fly over Guangzhou delivering papers that say the war will end soon. Long Hei visits Long Kwan in the hospital, and tells him about how the soldiers are starting to win against the Japanese. Long Kwan regrets listening to Kau Mui’s advice for him to step down. Lai Wah takes very good care of Long Kwan and he tells her that he will bring her into the business. Long Hei notices the growing tension between Lai Wah and Kau Mui. Meanwhile, Tachiya (Sunny Tai), Tetsuya's brother, takes interest in Ching Ching after seeing her at the hospital. Kau Mui is approached by the guerrillas who ask for her help, after knowing that she had rescued a guerrilla's son. She tells Lau Sing that she plans to help the guerrillas smuggle their telegraph from Macau to Guangzhou by hiding it in an opium shipment. Later, Lau Sing finds out after a competition with Tetsuya that the Japanese know about this matter and quickly warns Kau Mui through the phone to stop the shipment. However, a Japanese woman overhears Lau Sing and he discovers that she understands Cantonese. Lau Sing decides to bring Ching Ching out of Guangzhou after discussing the matter with Kau Mui. However, Fei Fan receives a call and is told to arrest Lau Sing on the suspicion that he is a guerrilla. The other police try to hide him and smuggle him out but he is surrounded by Japanese soldiers.
23	"Episode Twenty-three"	Fong Chun Chiu	Story by : Cheung Wah Biu & Chan Ching Yee; Teleplay by : Mak Sai Lung	17 November 2010
Fei Fan arrests Lau Sing's police team and all of his neighbours except Ching Ching who was not at home. Kau Mui finds out that Lau Sing has been arrested. She tries to negotiate with Fei Fan but he leaves her in the middle of the woods. When Kau Mui returns, she gets information that conversations are recorded in the prison cells. Ching Ching offers to help to save her neighbours while letting Kau Mui focus on saving her brother. Ching Ching takes advantage of Tachiya's interest in her and convinces him to release her neighbours from prison. She offers herself to him but he leaves and has Yeung Yeung, the last of the prisoners other than Lau Sing, released. Kau Mui is confronted by her family who warn her to keep her distance from Lau Sing. A desperate Kau Mui doesn't listen and takes all her family's savings and Tung Tai's shares to try to negotiate with Tetsuya for his release. She cooks up a story saying that she and Lau Sing are in a relationship but Tetsuya tells her there's nothing else he can do since it is known the Japanese Army would rather mistakenly kill innocent suspects than accidentally release a guerrilla. When Kau Mui meets with Lau Sing, he easily follows along with her story. Later, she accuses him of cheating on her with his ex-wife and fabricates fake love letters. Lau Sing follows along but is confused as to what Kau Mui's plan is. Kau Mui realizes that she can no longer live without Lau Sing and prays that her plan would work. When Lau Sing is taken to a trench to be executed, Kau Mui begs Tetsuya for her to be the one to shoot him. Lau Sing realizes her plan and plays along when Tetsuya wouldn't give in, pretending how much he actually hates her. They manage to convince Tetsuya and Kau Mui shoots him.
24	"Episode Twenty-four"	Fong Chun Chiu	Story by : Cheung Wah Biu & Chan Ching Yee; Teleplay by : Shek Hoi Ting	18 November 2010
As Kau Mui is leaving with the Japanese soldiers, she pretends to be carsick and is let out of the car. She races back to the scene where guerrillas are already present searching for Lau Sing who is buried underneath. They find him still breathing and bring him to a hidden underground shelter. A distraught Kau Mui watches as a medical team takes Lau Sing's bullet out and rescue him. The doorbell rings at Chu Lung Lane. Tachiya has brought flowers to show his sympathy for Ching Ching, whose brother has been killed. A guerrilla later arrives to take Ching Ching to see Lau Sing. They explain to her that they created a less damaging bullet, which Kau Mui used to shoot him. Ching Ching and Kau Mui comfort each other. Lau Sing recovers but has to remain in hiding as he is presumed dead. He says his goodbyes to Kau Mui, Ching Ching and his neighbours. Kau Mui gets caught in an air raid and heads for a shelter but becomes concerned after seeing Long Kwan and Lai Wah grow closer. Tetsuya becomes more displeased with Kau Mui, accusing her that after executing Lau Sing, she kept pushing back on opening new opium dens and broke her promise about giving extra shares to the Japanese Army. Tachiya threatens Ching Ching into going on a date and Yeung Yeung becomes worried. Meanwhile, Japanese soldiers barge into the Cheng house at night and arrest Kau Mui.
25	"Episode Twenty-five"	Luk Tin Wah	Story by : Cheung Wah Biu & Chan Ching Yee; Teleplay by : Yeung Suet Yee	22 November 2010
Kau Mui is brought to a concentration camp by the Japanese. She witnesses the horrors and suffers through poor conditions at the camp. Tachiya visits Chu Lung Lane and tells Ching Ching that he is leaving for Hong Kong in hopes that she can send him off. They find out that Kau Mui has been brought to a concentration camp. Long Kwan is brought to the hospital due to his poor health and constant worry about his daughter. Long Hei negotiates with Tetsuya and becomes his new business partner in opening the opium dens as she pretends to help Kau Mui get out of the camp. She gives Lai Wah power to speak for Long Kwan while he recovers in hospital and steals credit for saving the orphans that Kau Mui saved. Meanwhile, Chinese planes return and air raids grow more frequent as the Allies fight back against the Japanese Army. Kau Mui contracts malaria and believes that she won’t live long. She writes her last letter to Lau Sing. Lau Sing and other guerrillas return to Guangzhou undercover and threatens Fei Fan at gunpoint to find a way into the concentration camp.
26	"Episode Twenty-six"	Luk Tin Wah	Story by : Cheung Wah Biu & Chan Ching Yee; Teleplay by : Mak Sai Lung, Yeung Suet Yee	23 November 2010
The guerrillas including Lau Sing infiltrate the concentration camp. Lau Sing finds Kau Mui asleep, clutching the letter and reads it. He rescues her while the other prisoners escape and the concentration camp is destroyed by an air raid. Lau Sing visits Chu Lung Lane and tells everyone that he has joined the guerrillas and that Kau Mui is safe but no one can know as they are both presumed dead. He gives Ching Ching one of two fake hand grenades that can be used to scare away enemies. He and Kau Mui leave Guangzhou and he tells her that he will send her to a hospital in Chongqing to recover but he cannot stay with her because the guerrillas are sending him on a secret mission. He tells her that they will see each other back in Guangzhou when the war ends. He gives her the second fake grenade. Long Kwan and the Cheng family find out that the concentration camp has been destroyed and believe Kau Mui to be dead. Long Hei brings Siu Hong to meet Long Kwan. A changed Fei Fan suddenly apologizes to the police force and realizes his wrongdoings. Tetsuya is angry at his brother for liking Ching Ching, a Chinese woman, but cannot stop him from wearing his Japanese ceremonial robes and proposing to her. She pretends to say yes after he threatens to execute all her neighbours and takes out the fake grenade. She uses it to scare the Japanese and Yeung Yeung and Spareribs take their guns and kill them. Ching Ching faints in the chaos. The neighbours debate whether to take her to the hospital as the Japanese Army will be looking for them. Yeung Yeung takes her and the neighbours to the hideout. The police force tell Fei Fan that they need to go arrest Yeung Yeung, Spareribs, and the rest of the people at Chu Lung Lane but Fei Fan tells them to let them go.
27	"Episode Twenty-seven"	Luk Tin Wah	Story by : Cheung Wah Biu & Chan Ching Yee; Teleplay by : Mak Sai Lung, Yeung Suet Yee	24 November 2010
Siu Hong promises Long Kwan to be a good son and not meddle with Tung Tai's affairs. Kau Mui recovers from malaria and wants to return to Guangzhou as soon as possible once the war ends. Lau Sing accomplishes his mission and hears from his neighbours that Ching Ching’s illness has relapsed after returning to Guangzhou. Fei Fan tries to assassinate Tetsuya but gets shot instead. On August 15th 1945, Imperial Japan surrenders officially ending World War II. Yeung Yeung rushes Ching Ching to the hospital while Guangzhou celebrates. A group of people barge into the Cheng family's house and throw rocks calling the family traitors but Long Hei kicks them out. Lau Sing returns to the police station and sees an injured Fei Fan. Fei Fan explains that his pregnant wife was executed by Japanese soldiers at the hospital under Tetsuya's orders. He tells Lau Sing to help take care of his other son before he dies from his wounds. Tetsuya, under disguise, is seen by Lau Sing and Chinese soldiers but he surrenders, meaning they cannot execute him. Spareribs shoots him regardless. Lau Sing and the public plead for Spareribs to be released after sharing the horrific crimes Tetsuya has committed and the Chinese soldiers turn a blind eye. Kau Mui returns to Guangzhou and reunites with Long Kwan. The rest of the Cheng family is not happy seeing her alive. Long Hei worries that Kau Mui will snatch away everything that Siu Hong has but Kau Mui expresses no interest in Tung Tai's affairs. Long Kwan tells Kau Mui that he plans to marry Lai Wah and tells her to think about her own future.
28	"Episode Twenty-eight"	Wong Kwok Keung, Luk Tin Wah	Story by : Cheung Wah Biu & Chan Ching Yee; Teleplay by : Shek Hoi Ting, Yeung Suet Yee	25 November 2010
Kau Mui fulfills her promise from 8 years ago, and invites all the neighbours from Chu Lung Lane for a meal. As they celebrate, the crowd brings up Lau Sing being shot and Kau Mui breaks down. Kau Mui and Lau Sing discuss their future plans and she tells Lau Sing she can sense something strange about Siu Hong and Long Hei. With Long Hung's help, Kau Mui plans to convince her father to look away from the opium business, which have been made officially illegal after the war, and start legal businesses. She plans to ask Lau Sing to come and help her. The police chief offers Lau Sing a promotion in Nanjing and he considers taking it as they have better hospitals that can help with Ching Ching's illness. Kau Mui hides her disappointment and tells him to go for her sister. Lau Sing hides his own disappointment. Long Hung returns from Shanghai. Siu Hong and Long Hei take full control over the business. Kau Mui and Long Hung come up with a plan to eliminate opium from Tung Tai. In front of all of Tung Tai's employees, they pitch their idea to start a legal business. Kau Mui and Lau Sing discuss the poor economy as the Chinese currency's value dramatically falls. People begin discussing rumours surrounding a possible civil war. Kau Mui asks Lai Wah if she really loves Long Kwan as they prepare for the wedding. Kau Mui tells Long Hung that someone overheard Long Hei calling Siu Hong "son".
29	"Episode Twenty-nine"	Wong Kwok Keung	Story by : Cheung Wah Biu & Chan Ching Yee; Teleplay by : Shek Hoi Ting, Yeung Suet Yee	26 November 2010
Ching Ching's condition worsens. Lai Wah tells the Cheng family about Kau Mui burning down Tung Tai's opium warehouse and her plan to eliminate opium. Long Kwan slaps Kau Mui and she is forbidden from going near the business or from attending the wedding. He also tells Kau Mui that Tung Tai will continue with the opium business. A heartbroken and humiliated Kau Mui blames herself for not taking good enough care of Lai Wah and breaks down in front of Lau Sing, who tries to comfort her but ends up bickering with her, telling her to stop blaming herself since she already did all she can. Long Kwan and Lai Wah get married. Lau Sing and Yeung Yeung find out Ching Ching is in her final stages and there is nothing else that can be done. Kau Mui encourages Lau Sing not to give up, and both of them cry. Yeung Yeung takes leave to bring Ching Ching out and she knows that her condition has worsened. Yeung Yeung proposes to Ching Ching, and also tells the neighbours about Ching Ching’s condition. Long Hung is unable to find proof of Siu Hong and Long Hei's relationship. Kau Mui frets over this matter and Lau Sing comes up with a plan. They pretend to be drunk and interrogate Siu Hong, Long Hei, and Tai Fung. Kau Mui pulls out the fake grenade.
30	"Episode Thirty"	Wong Kwok Keung	Story by : Cheung Wah Biu & Chan Ching Yee; Teleplay by : Shek Hoi Ting, Yeung Suet Yee	27 November 2010
Out of fear, Tai Fung betrays Long Hei and blurts out the truth. He tells Kau Mui and Lau Sing that while Long Kwan was away on business, Long Hei got pregnant with a theatre actor. At the same time, Long Kwan's wife had a miscarriage so they pretended Siu Hong was Long Kwan's son. Lau Sing and Kau Mui run off together from the restaurant after learning the truth. Long Kwan finds out that Siu Hong is not his son and realizes Long Hei and Siu Hong have been trying to steal the family business. Long Hei continues to lie and says Siu Hong's father is a friend who once saved Long Kwan. Kau Mui helps Long Hei and Siu Hong by telling her father to let them have a quarter of the family assets and allowing them to leave in peace. Long Kwan decides to give Kau Mui's business proposal a chance. Yeung Yeung and Ching Ching get married. Ching Ching asks Kau Mui to sit beside Lau Sing for the tea ceremony. Lai Wah accompanies Long Kwan to a gathering, and she is widely accepted by the gang members as Long Kwan's wife. Long Kwan has a stroke and leaves Lai Wah in charge of Tung Tai. Ching Ching writes her last diary entry before she faints. Kau Mui visits her in the hospital after her business trip to Shaoguan and Ching Ching tells her to bring Lau Sing with her next time. Ching Ching asks Yeung Yeung to read her diary to her.
31	"Episode Thirty-one"	Wong Kwok Keung	Story by : Cheung Wah Biu & Chan Ching Yee; Teleplay by : Shek Hoi Ting, Yeung Suet Yee	28 November 2010
At the hospital, Kau Mui comforts Lau Sing. She questions who will be waiting for her when she dies. Lau Sing replies depends on who leaves first; if he does, then he'll wait for her. Ching Ching requests to be discharged from hospital. She dies on her way home. Yeung Yeung reads her diary out loud to everyone at her funeral. Kau Mui discusses opening a bank with Lau Sing and asks if he would come with her if she decides to start the business overseas. He tells her that he will follow her wherever she decides to go. Long Hei returns and tells Kau Mui that Tai Fung died escaping the civil war, as the Communist government took control of Shanghai. She asks Kau Mui for more money. Kau Mui refuses. With the Nationalists unable to hold onto China for more than a few weeks, all public servants including Lau Sing, Spareribs and his police colleagues are ordered to evacuate to Taiwan. Lau Sing receives news that the Communist Government is coming for Kau Mui and Long Kwan. He meets with Kau Mui in the middle of the night and tells her to leave immediately and that he will leave with her, promising to be with her in life or death. An air raid strikes the church but they escape in time. Siu Hong returns to the Cheng house with Long Hei and threatens both Long Kwan and Kau Mui for another quarter of the inheritance. Long Kwan shoots and kills him and a crying Long Hei drags away Siu Hong's body. Later, a mob breaks into the Cheng house and attempts to beat Kau Mui to death, blaming her for opening the opium dens. A tussle ensues, and Kau Mui is injured in the process. Lau Sing arrives just in time, tells the crowd of Kau Mui's good deeds and uses his gun to scare away the crowd. First aired on TVB Jade as Part 1 of a two-part finale
32 (Finale)	"Episode Thirty-two"	Wong Kwok Keung	Story by : Cheung Wah Biu & Chan Ching Yee; Teleplay by : Shek Hoi Ting, Yeung Suet Yee	28 November 2010
Long Kwan decides not to follow Kau Mui to Hawaii, fearing of dragging her down. Lau Sing and Spareribs decide to accompany Long Kwan to Guangxi before meeting the rest back in Guangzhou and leaving for America. However, Long Kwan gets hit by a bomb and dies on the journey while Lau Sing goes missing following the explosion. Spareribs comes back to tell everyone the news and Kau Mui is devastated. She waits for Lau Sing in the church but he never shows. Her family eventually convinces her to leave as the Communist government begins entering Guangzhou. Kau Mui experiences seasickness on the boat as she leaves the city and reminisces the moments she was with Lau Sing as she cries. Meanwhile, Lau Sing awakens at a hospital in Nanning with amnesia, only remembering that he needed to meet with someone. Kau Mui eventually arrives in Honolulu. For the next 30 years (within every 10 years), she would buy a space for a "missing person" ad on a local Chinese newspaper, in an effort to locate Lau Sing. Lau Sing never contacts her. After 30 years, in 1979, China began its reform and opening process, and Kau Mui can finally make a trip to Guangzhou to find Lau Sing. When she arrives, Kau Mui reunited with almost everyone at Chu Lung Lane (with the exception of Wong Luk's wife, who died at some unspecified point in time). It turns out that Spareribs and the rest of his police colleagues never had a chance to escape to Taiwan; the military evacuation ship never arrived. After the Communists entered Guangzhou, Chu Lung Lane was confiscated from Madam Yeung and they all separated to different places. The house was only repatriated to Madam Yeung recently. Spareribs is married (wife is not shown), and has a son and a grandson. Kau Mui reveals Lai Wah married a half Chinese/Western (specific nationality not revealed), Sister Teak died a few years after they arrived in Hawaii, and she herself adopted a child who later had a daughter. Spareribs goes on to tell Kau Mui what happened to Lau Sing. He was saved by the new government, taken to a hospital to recover and later served the Communists during the Korean War in the first few years of his memory loss. He eventually regained his memory and came back to Guangzhou but everyone had left. He tried to swim to Hong Kong many times, so that he can have a chance to fly to the U.S. to meet Kau Mui but kept getting caught and spent close to more than a decade in prison. During the Cultural Revolution, Lau Sing was exiled to Shaanxi. After the Cultural Revolution, he was allowed to return to Guangzhou, and in recognition of his still-excellent sharpshooting skills, he was appointed as principal of a police training academy in Foshan. He returns to Chu Lung Lane on his days off and never stopped making attempts to get an American visa from a nearby U.S. consulate to find Kau Mui. He also vows that he must preserve his life, so that one day he can meet Kau Mui. Just as Spareribs was finished with telling Kau Mui what happened to Lau Sing, Lau Sing suddenly returns to Chu Lung Lane saying he was called for a second interview to receive his visa. Kau Mui and Lau Sing finally reunite and they spend their remaining time together in Hong Kong. In a series of photos, they are shown traveling around the world and having a joyous time together. In 1983, Lau Sing dies on Kau Mui's shoulder while the two enjoy the sunset in Hong Kong. A year later, in 1984, Kau Mui and her adopted granddaughter visits the place where she pretended to kill Lau Sing. She finds the fake love letters, and still carries the fake grenade that Lau Sing gave her. The story finally comes full circle. In 1994, Kau Mui, now Granny Kau, also dies while watching the sunset. Her funeral is held at the church that she and Lau Sing always lingered in. The orphans that she saved gather around to mourn for her. Chan Mei-Ting, the orphan Kau Mui thought was not on the train, sums up Kau Mui's life of contradictions: a woman who carried the facade of a drug lord and a traitor having worked with the Japanese Army in the public eye but only to save countless lives including thousands of children. In the final scene, a flashback shows Lau Sing and Kau Mui on the bench outside the hospital. Kau Mui wonders if there will be anyone waiting for her when she dies and Lau Sing replies, "Depends on who leaves first. If I leave first, then I'll wait for you." First aired on TVB Jade as Part 2 of a two-part finale

== See also ==
- List of No Regrets characters
- Just-noregrets.blogspot.com "No Regrets" episodic synopsis (in English)
