= List of No Regrets characters =

No Regrets is a television period drama produced by TVB. The drama is an indirect spin-off of the 2009 award-winning drama Rosy Business.

== Cheng Family ==
Cast	Role	Description
Elliot Ngok	Cheng Long-kwan 鄭朗軍	Age 60; A gang leader Cheng Long-hung and Cheng Long-hei's brother Cheng Kau-mui and Cheng Siu-kit's father Cheng Siu-hong's father, actually his uncle Ma Lai-wah's husband Killed Cheng Siu-hong in Episode 31; Died when fleeing to Guangxi in Episode 32 (Semi-Villain)
Nancy Wu	Ma Lai-wah 馬麗華	Age 20; Mui Lan-heung's daughter Cheng Long-kwan's wife Betrayed Cheng Kau-mui; Re-married in Honolulu in Episode 32 (Semi-Villain)
Kwok Fung	Cheng Long-hung 鄭朗熊	Cheng Long-kwan and Cheng Long-hei's brother Cheng Kau-mui, Cheng Siu-hong and Cheng Siu-kit's uncle
Susan Tse	Cheng Long-hei 鄭朗喜	Age 50; A gang main member Cheng Long-kwan and Cheng Long-hung's sister Cheng Kau-mui and Cheng Siu-kit's aunt Cheng Siu-hong's aunt, actually his mother Cheng Kau-mui's enemy Colluded with Cheng Siu Hong and Choi Tai Fung; Became mad after Cheng Siu-hong died in Episode 31 (Main Villain)
Sheren Tang	Cheng Kau-mui 鄭九妹	Age 30; Miss Kau; A gang main member Cheng Long-kwan's daughter Cheng Long-hung and Cheng Long-hei's niece Choi Tai-fung's niece Cheng Siu-hong's sister (confirmed half-sister in TVB's written biography), actually her cousin Cheng Siu-kit's sister (confirmed half-sister in TVB's written biography); Lau Sing's friend and enemy, finally her husband. Leung Fei-fan, Cheng Long-hei, Cheng Siu-hong, Cheng Siu-kit, and Choi Tai-fung's enemy Killed Kurogi Takamori in Episode 20; Betrayed by Ma Lai-wah; Died in Hong Kong in Episode 1 and 32 (1994) Young Cheng Kau-mui played by Janice Yau Tze-yung
Ben Wong	Cheng Siu-hong 鄭少康	Cheng Long-kwan's son, actually his nephew Cheng Long-hung's nephew Cheng Long-hei's nephew, actually her son with Lee Kam-lung, a theatre actor Choi Tai-fung's nephew Cheng Kau-mui's half-brother and enemy, actually her cousin Cheng Siu-kit's brother, actually his cousin Colluded with Cheng Long-hei and Choi Tai-fung; Killed by Cheng Long-kwan in Episode 31 (Villain)
Deno Cheung	Cheng Siu-kit 鄭少傑	Cheng Long-kwan's son Cheng Long-hung and Cheng Long-hei's nephew Cheng Kau-mui's half-brother and enemy Cheng Siu-hong's brother, actually his cousin Choi Tai-fung's nephew Killed by Choi Hing in Episode 2 (Villain)

== Lau Family ==
Cast	Role	Description
Wayne Lai	Lau Sing 劉醒	Age 38 (Age 30 on TVB's written biography); A police sergeant, later deputy commissioner of Nanking Police Bureau; Deputy Chief Director of Anti-Japanese Guerrillas of the South China People; Chiu Tung-nei's husband, but later divorced Lau Ching's brother Leung Fei-fan's subordinate and enemy Tong Kat and Yeung Yeung's supervisor Cheng Kau-mui's friend and enemy, finally his wife after being divorced with Tung-nei. Killed Miyazaki in Episode 26; Died in Hong Kong in Episode 32 (1983)
Elena Kong	Chiu Tung-nei 趙冬妮	Age 30; Lau Sing's wife, later divorced Leung Fei-fan's childhood friend, later his wife, finally divorced Returned to her hometown, Guilin, in Episode 10
Fala Chen	Lau Ching 劉晴	Age 20 Ching Ching; An office typewriter Lau Sing's sister Yeung Yeung's girlfriend, finally his wife Suffered from heart disease Died in Episode 31.

== Yeung Family ==
Cast	Role	Description
Kara Hui	Ng Lai-sim 吳麗嬋	Age 45; Madam Yeung A landlady who manages Chu Lung Lane; Yeung Yeung's mother
Raymond Wong Ho-yin	Yeung Yeung 楊陽	Age 27; A police officer Ng Lai-sim's son Lau Ching's boyfriend, finally her husband

== Tung Tai Company ==
Cast	Role	Description
Elliot Ngok	Cheng Long-kwan 鄭朗軍	Boss
Kwok Fung	Cheng Long-hung 鄭朗熊	Director
Susan Tse	Cheng Long-hei 鄭朗喜	Director
Sheren Tang	Cheng Kau-mui 鄭九妹	Director
Helen Ma	Chow Teet 周鐵	President Sister Teak Born Chow Man-kuen (周文娟) Changed her name to Teak (鐵 meaning "iron") after being rescued by Cheng Long-kwan; Cheng Kau-mui's subordinate and trusted follower Died in Episode 32 (before 1979)
Henry Lo Chun-shun	Choi Tai-fung 蔡大鳳	President; Cheng Long-kwan's brother in-law Cheng Siu-hong and Cheng Siu-kit's uncle Cheng Kau-mui's uncle and enemy Colludes with Cheng Long-hei and Cheng Siu-hong; Died in a riot during Shanghai Liberation in Episode 31 (Main Villain)
Hoffman Cheng Sai-ho	Chan Sum 陳森	Cheng Kau-mui and Chow Tit's subordinate Cheng Kau-mui's trusted follower
Chiu Shek-man	Uncle Shek 石叔	Leader; Cheng Kau-mui's trusted follower
Lam King-kong	Smoker Kau 煙剷球	Leader; Cheng Kau-mui's trusted follower
Bruce Lee Hung-kit	Uncle Lung 龍叔	Retired leader Cheng Kau-mui's trusted follower Found Cheng Kau-mui when she escaped from kidnappers
Samson Yeung Ying-wai	Choi Hing 蔡興	Accountant; Killed Cheng Siu-kit in Episode 2
Joseph Yeung Sai-gwan		Tung Tai Pakapoo Lottery Company employee Officiates lottery draw (Episode 2)
Andy Siu Cheuk-yiu		Tung Tai employee Follower of Cheng Long-hei and Cheng Siu-hong

== Canton Police Bureau ==
Cast	Role	Description
Sam Leung Kin-ping		A police bureau director Leung Fei-fan's supervisor
Evergreen Mak	Leung Fei-fan 梁非凡	Age 32; A police commissioner Lau Sing's supervisor and enemy Cheng Kau-mui's enemy Chiu Tung-nei's childhood friend, later her husband, finally divorced Rose's husband Killed by Mukaiyama Tetsuya in Episode 27 (Main Villain but later realizes his mistakes after his wife dies)
Wayne Lai	Lau Sing 劉醒	A police sergeant Leung Fei-fan's subordinate and enemy Yeung Yeung, Tong Kat, Che Wing-ping and Che Wing-on's supervisor
Raymond Wong Ho-yin	Yeung Yeung 楊陽	A police officer Lau Sing's subordinate Killed Mukaiyama Tachiya in Episode 26
Pierre Ngo	Tong Kat 唐吉	Age 25 (Age 27 on TVB's written biography); Spareribs; A police officer Lau Sing's subordinate Killed Mukaiyama Tachiya in Episode 26; Killed Mukaiyama Tetsuya in Episode 27, arrested, later released after Lau Sing's speech.
Simon Lo	Che Wing-ping 車永平	Big Che; A police officer Che Wing-on's brother Lau Sing's subordinate
Kelvin Leung	Che Wing-on 車永安	Small Che; A police officer Che Wing-ping's brother Lau Sing's subordinate
Martin Tong Chun-ming	Apple-polish Keung 擦鞋強	A police officer Lau Sing's subordinate Leung Fei-fan's trusted follower Promoted to sergeant by Leung Fei-fan after Lau Sing's "death" (Villain)

== Imperial Japanese Army ==
Cast	Role	Description
King Kong	Mukaiyama Tetsuya 向山鐵也	Age 35; General; Mukaiyama Tachiya's elder brother Kurogi Takamori and Miyazaki's supervisor Killed Leung Fei-fan in Episode 27; Killed by Tong Kat in Episode 27 (Main Villain)
Sunny Dia Yiu Ming	Mukaiyama Tachiya 向山達也	Colonel; Mukaiyama Tetsuya's younger brother Loves Lau Ching; Killed by Yeung Yeung and Tong Kat in Episode 26 (Villain)
Oscar Li Ka	Kurogi Takamori 黑木隆盛	Major; Mukaiyama Tetsuya's subordinate Killed by Cheng Kau-mui in Episode 20 (Villain)
Man Yeung Ching-wah	Miyazaki 宮崎	Major; Mukaiyama Tetsuya's subordinate Responsible for managing a concentration camp in Canton; Killed by Lau Sing in Episode 26 (Villain)
Bert Mok Wai-man	Uncle Ming 銘叔	A Japanese interpreter and traitor Revealed Japanese information to Cheng Kau-mui for money
Wai Man-ngai	Hung Tak-nam 熊德南	A Japanese interpreter and traitor

== Other cast ==
Cast	Role	Description
Henry Lee	Wong Man-fai 黃文輝	Wong Luk (黃綠, literally means "quack doctor", nickname "quack" is used in English subtitles); An unlicensed doctor Lee Yuk-king's husband Chu Lung Lane resident
Eileen Yeow	Lee Yuk-king 李玉琼	Madam Wong Wong Man-fai's wife Chu Lung Lane resident Died in Episode 32 (before 1979)
Wendy Hon	Mui Lan-heung 梅蘭香	A drug addict Ma Lai-wah's mother Cheng Kau-mui's sworn sister Died in Episode 15 Young Lan-heung played by Angel Chiang
Yau Piu	Tang Siu-cheung 鄧兆祥	Mo Dang Cheung A hair stylist Friend of neighbours at Chu Lung Lane
Mandy Lam	Mok Yin-ping 莫燕萍	Friend of neighbours at Chu Lung Lane
Eddie Li Hong	Lee Cho-tak 李祖德	Friend of neighbours at Chu Lung Lane
Mak Ka Lun	Kuen 豆腐權	Nicknamed Tofu Kuen Friend of neighbours at Chu Lung Lane
Georgina Chan Nim-kwan	Mrs. Kuen	Kuen's wife Died in an air raid in Episode 13
Lau Kong	Wu Tai-yuen 胡大元	Mr. Wu Boss of Wing Yip Bank
Hui Pik Kei	Grandma Kuat 骨嬤	Tong Kat's grandmother Died in Episode 7
Joe Junior	Boss Tong 唐老闆	Lau Ching's boss
Fanny Ip	Rose 玫瑰	Leung Fei-fan's wife Executed by Imperial Japanese Army in Episode 27
Janice Shum	Reporter	Interviews Cheng Kau-mui in 1984
Cayley Mak	Ka Yan 嘉欣	Cheng Kau-mui and Lau Sing's adopted granddaughter (1984) Young Ka Yan (1969) played by Ruby Cheng Ho Lam
Chan On-ying	Chan Mei-ting 陳美婷	One of the orphan children rescued by Cheng Kau-mui Captain Chan's daughter Young version (1941) played by Elkie Chong
Raymond Tsang Sau-ming	Captain Chan 陳隊長	Chan Mei-ting's father A guerrilla who asked Cheng Kau-mui for assistance Helped save Lau Sing from execution
Ronald Law	To Yau Cheong 道友昌	Works under Leung Fei-fan
Lily Poon	Doctor Ho	Lau Ching's doctor
Lily Liu Lai-lai	Sister Ying 英姐	Cheng family maid
Leo Tsang Kin-ming		Dean at orphanage
Kitty Lau		Associate dean at orphanage
Paul Gare	Hospital Chief Mak	Lan-heung's doctor in Hong Kong
Lai Sau-ying	Aunt Ng	Tong Kat's grandmother's close friend Works as a maid for Tung Tai
Otto Chan Chi-kin		A guerrilla Attempted to assassinate Cheng Kau-mui but shot Lau Sing instead Helped save Lau Sing from execution
Daniel Kwok Cheuk-Wah		A guerrilla Arrested and later released by Leung Fei-fan Helped save Lau Sing from execution
Chan Wing-chun	Ta Tsai-hok	A funeral celebrant
Steve Lee Ka-ting	Uncle Ying Hung	A gang leader and opium dealer Tung Tai and Cheng Kau-mui's rival (Episode 11)
Snow Suen Wai-suet		Nurse
Kirby Lam Sau-yee		Nurse
Jenny Fan Choi-yee		Nurse
Kimmi Tsui		Nurse
Pauline Chow Po-lam		Choi-hing's wife Assaulted by Cheng Siu-kit Revealed to have committed suicide in Episode 4
Calinda Chan		Lau Ching's coworker
Fanny Lee		Rose's friend
Mikako Leung		Rose's friend
Calvin Lui Hei		Citizen of Guangzhou Threw an egg at Cheng Kau-mui Executed by Tetsuya in Episode 18
Shally Tsang	Ms. Lam	A guerrilla's wife Asked Cheng Kau-mui to help her son escape (Episode 19)
Even Chan Ka-ka		A Japanese woman
Kerry Chan	Nako Tokusaki	A Japanese woman
Tammy Ho Ting-yan		A Japanese woman Overheard Lau Sing on the phone and reported him as a guerrilla
Yaka Fu	Ms. Leung	A Japanese language teacher A concentration camp prisoner
Kelvin Chan	Secretary Tong	A British Consulate employee A concentration camp prisoner Killed by Miyazaki (Episode 25)
Brian Burrell	Doctor Jansen	An overseas cardiologist doctor (Episode 29)
Jason Chan	Henry	Character in movie (Episode 16)
Corinna Chamberlain	Mary	Character in movie (Episode 16)
Amy Tsang		Waitress (Episode 29)
Wong Wai-tak	Mr. Law	An accountant
Miguel Choi Hong Nin		Doctor in Nanning hospital (Episode 32)
English Tang Ying-man	Officer Ho	Works for the State Cultural Relics Bureau in Guangzhou in 1984 (Episode 1 & 32)
Albert Law Ho-kai	Wong	Wah Kiu Daily News Honolulu Branch Staff (Episode 32)
Ko Chun-man	Secretary Shum	Greets and guides Cheng Kau-mui after she arrives in Guangzhou in 1979 (Episode 32)

== See also ==
- No Regrets (TV series)
- List of No Regrets episodes
