= No Regrets (TV series) =

2010 Hong Kong period television drama

- Official poster
- Also known as: Rosy Business II; Rosy Business: No Regrets

Chinese name
- Traditional Chinese: 巾幗梟雄之義海豪情
- Simplified Chinese: 巾帼枭雄之义海豪情
- Literal meaning: Veiled Heroine, Ruthless Hero: Righteous Sea, Lofty Passion
Transcriptions
Standard Mandarin
- Hanyu Pinyin: jīn guó xiāo xióng zhī yì hǎi háo qíng
Yue: Cantonese
- Jyutping: gan1 gwok3 hiu1 hung4 zi1 ji6 hoi2 hou4 cing4
- Genre: Period drama Romantic thriller
- Created by: Lee Tim-Shing
- Written by: Cheung Wah-Biu; Chan Ching-Yee
- Starring: Sheren Tang; Wayne Lai
- Theme music composer: Tang Chi-wai, Yip Siu-chung
- Opening theme: 義海豪情 by Leo Ku
- Ending theme: Various Instrumental Music by Leo Ku (Episodes 1-31) "紅蝴蝶" by Ron Ng (covered by Wayne Lai) (Finale)^{[a]}
- Country of origin: Hong Kong
- Original languages: Cantonese; Japanese
- No. of episodes: 32 (list of episodes)

Production
- Executive producer: Lee Tim-shing
- Production location: Hong Kong
- Camera setup: Multi camera
- Running time: 45 mins.
- Production company: TVB

Original release
- Network: Jade; HD Jade
- Release: 18 October – 28 November 2010

Related
- Rosy Business (2009); No Reserve (2016); No Return (2024)

No Regrets
- intertitle
- Traditional Chinese: 巾幗梟雄之義海豪情
- Simplified Chinese: 巾帼枭雄之义海豪情
- Literal meaning: Veiled Heroine, Ruthless Hero: Righteous Sea, Heroic Passion
Transcriptions
Standard Mandarin
- Hanyu Pinyin: Jīn Guó Xiāo Xióng Zhī Yì Hǎi Háo Qíng
Yue: Cantonese
- Yale Romanization: Gān Gwok Hīu Hùhng Jī Yih Hói Hòuh Chìhng
- Jyutping: Gan1 Gwok3 Hiu1 Hung4 Zi1 Ji6 Hoi2 Hou4 Cing4

No Regrets (Chinese: 巾幗梟雄之義海豪情) is a 2010 Hong Kong period television drama created and produced by Lee Tim-shing for TVB as a grand production. It is the second installment of the Rosy Business franchise. It stars Wayne Lai and Sheren Tang in the 2nd installment of the Rosy Business.

Set in Canton, Republic of China during the years of the Second Sino-Japanese War, it follows the lives of Lau Sing (Wayne Lai) and Cheng Kau-mui (Sheren Tang), who go against all odds to protect their families from the violence of war.

No Regrets is the companion piece of Rosy Business (2009) featuring majority of the same cast with a new storyline set in a different time period. It premiered on Jade and HD Jade networks from 18 October 2010 and aired for 32 episodes, with the final two episodes airing back-to-back on 28 November 2010. It was one of two anniversary dramas used to celebrate TVB's 43rd anniversary in 2010, the other being Gun Metal Grey. Both dramas were the first Hong Kong dramas to broadcast live with English subtitles. It stars TVB Best Actress winners Sheren Tang (2009/2010) who won for this series and its first instalment, Nancy Wu (2015/2016), Kara Wai (2019), Elena Kong (2022), and TVB Best Actor winner Wayne Lai (2009/2010/2012) who also won for this series and its first instalment.

The drama received critical acclaim during its broadcast, and is the second highest-rated television drama in 2010 in average live viewership. The final episode peaked at 47 TVRs with 3.43 million live viewers, becoming Hong Kong's most-watched episode of the 2010s decade and continues to hold the record in viewership on TVB's online service MyTV with an additional 3.7 million clicks days after its live broadcast. No Regrets received multiple awards at the TVB Anniversary Awards sweeping the main acting categories, including Best Actor (Wayne Lai), Best Actress (Sheren Tang), Best Supporting Actor (Mak Cheung-ching), Best Supporting Actress (Fala Chen), and Most Improved Actor (Raymond Wong Ho-yin). With a score of 9.4 out of 10 on Douyin, the drama remains the highest-rated Hong Kong drama of all time with over 70,000 reviews on the platform. In 2022, the drama was selected as one of ten classic TVB dramas being honoured for a new joint Youku and TVB programme.

== Overview ==
Set in the late 1930s to late 1940s in Canton, Republic of China during World War II, No Regrets is an epic drama that centers on a triad family, the Canton police force, and the Japanese occupation of the city. The Chinese title of No Regrets (巾幗梟雄之義海豪情) literally translates to "Veiled Heroine, Ruthless Hero: Righteous Sea, Heroic Passion", referring to its main theme of righteousness being as vast as the sea and the bond shared by the two main characters, Cheng Kau-mui (Sheren Tang) and Lau Sing (Wayne Lai). The English title No Regrets refers to Lau Sing's dedication and willingness to make sacrifices for Cheng Kau-mui which is referenced in the line from the theme song "for love, I live without regrets".

=== Synopsis ===
Canton is in a state of political turmoil in the 1930s. Gangsters are on a rampage and opium trading becomes rampant. As they watch the illicit profits from opium trading escalate, the government forms the Anti-Smoking Bureau under the guise of suppressing opium, but the bureau is under the influence of Cheng Long-kwan (Elliot Ngok), the gang's kingpin. His eldest daughter Cheng Kau-mui (Sheren Tang) who is an unscrupulous person soon returns from Shanghai to reap the rewards. Mui meticulously plans her every move.

On the other hand, Lau Sing (Wayne Lai) is the leader of the Criminal Investigation Team. He has worked hard all his life to ensure an easy trail for his family. Despite his hot temper, he values friendship and brotherhood more than anything else. He almost sacrifices his life to help his timid teammate, Spareribs (Ngo Ka-nin).

Meanwhile, the Japanese army invades China and Canton falls into the hands of the Japanese. Mui enters the darkest time in her life when her aunt Cheng Long-hei (Susan Tse) frames her. Luckily, Sing is always by her side as the two begin to share a complicated relationship after experiencing various political and emotional setbacks.

== Production ==
=== Development and Casting ===
After the critical and popular success of Rosy Business, TVB decided to produce a sequel for the drama. Most of the original main cast signed on to film the sequel, with the exception of Kiki Sheung, Ron Ng, and Suki Chui, who were reported to be not taking part in the production due to schedule conflicts. While the production was labeled as a sequel, the term was only a namesake. Wayne Lai, who portrayed Chai Kau in the predecessor, expressed that he would not film a sequel to Rosy Business: "I do not wish [to film a sequel]. Chai Kau's ending was the most significance part of his life. He will not appear in this world again." Sheren Tang and many of the other cast members also agreed and expressed that the ending to Rosy Business was perfect, and that there was no need to film a direct sequel but could rather do a whole new story.

It was announced that the sequel will be a completely different story taking place during World War II in Guangzhou, about 100 years after the events of Rosy Business. A sales presentation trailer of No Regrets featuring majority of the original cast was filmed on 25 October 2009 in TVB's filming studio in Tseung Kwan O, Hong Kong. The three-minute trailer aired on the TVB Jade channel on 6 December 2009 during TVB's 42nd Gala Presentation, and received an overwhelmingly positive reception. It featured new cast members Fala Chen and Raymond Wong in the second lead roles. Many of the storylines and supporting characters teased in the trailer were changed but one of the shots was kept as the title card in the opening theme. 50 random locals were interviewed in the streets, and 58% chose No Regrets as their most anticipated drama of 2010. Several Mainland China news portals also listed No Regrets as one of the top 15 for most anticipating upcoming Hong Kong/Taiwanese dramas. Additional new cast members including Evergreen Mak, Elena Kong and Henry Lo joined the cast later on.

=== Filming ===
A costume fitting was held on 10 March 2010 at TVB's headquarters. A blessing ceremony was held on 8 May 2010 at the same place. Filming took place in Hong Kong, with most scenes set inside TVB City and some in local parks and historical sites. Filming began under the working title Rosy Business II (巾幗梟雄之義海豪情) on 25 March 2010 and ended on 19 July 2010. The official English title was announced as No Regrets.

=== Music ===
Leo Ku recorded the theme song for the series, titled the same name, on 29 August 2010. Lai also recorded a cover of Rosy Business' theme song "Red Butterfly" which was played in the final episode. Lai later revealed that he suggested to Lee for him to cover the song rather than playing the original version as he believed it should be his character, Lau Sing, singing it to Tang's character, Cheng Kau-mui.

== Cast and characters ==
=== Main ===
- Sheren Tang as Cheng Kau-mui (鄭九妹):

Known as Miss Kau (九姑娘), she is the only daughter of Cheng Long-kwan, the most powerful drug tycoon in Canton. Holding a deep hatred for drugs, Miss Kau hopes to gain full control of her father's expansive opium business in order to destroy it from within. She is extremely intelligent and will do whatever it takes to get what she wants but behind her tough demeanor, she is actually one who always puts other's needs over herself. Tang expressed that it took her a while to grasp Miss Kau's character. "Her character is extremely complex. She doesn't abide to one direction; she may be doing one thing, but she's actually thinking of doing something else in her head. She's an extremely manipulative woman." Tang describes Miss Kau and Sing's romantic relationship as "extremely complicated; there's love and hate, right and wrong; and most of the time, they oppose each other."

- Wayne Lai as Lau Sing (劉醒):

The intuitive, sharp-tongued captain of a police crew in Canton. Originally a bad-tempered man, Sing is one who is incredibly loyal to those around him. After being the only one who learns about Miss Kau's true motives, Sing develops a strong bond with her and is willing to put his own life on the line to protect her as she puts herself into constant danger to help others. Lai considers No Regrets to be his representative work. He describes Sing to be a man with a sad fate.

- Fala Chen portrays Lau Ching (劉晴):

Nicknamed Ching Ching, she is Sing's younger sister who suffers from a congenital heart disease. She has feelings for Yeung Yeung, but is afraid to act on them due to her illness.

- Raymond Wong Ho-yin portrays Yeung Yeung (楊陽):

A member of Sing's police crew. Yeung Yeung's mother owns an apartment in Chu Lung Lane (豬籠里), in which Sing is a tenant. Thoughtful and selfless, Yeung Yeung always puts Ching Ching's needs before his own.

- Ngo Ka-nin portrays Tong Kat (唐吉):

Nicknamed Spareribs (排骨), a metaphorical phrase for "skinny weakling", Spareribs is Sing's subordinate and housemate. Unlike Ngo's portrayal of the villainous Chiang Bit-man in Rosy Business, Spareribs is a much simpler and kinder character. He has no ambition in life, and becomes a police officer only because he wants to live a steady life.

=== Supporting ===
- Mak Cheung-ching as Leung Fei-fan (梁非凡), known as Fei Fan Gor, a police captain and Sing's direct superior. Corrupted by money and power, he is willing to betray others for his own gain. After being tricked by Lau Sing and Miss Kau, he seeks revenge on them and begins to work with the Japanese Army.
- Elliot Ngok as Cheng Long-kwan (鄭朗軍), Miss Kau's father. As Canton's richest drug trader, Kwan is one of the four founding members, and its leader, of the region's largest opium business Tung Tai.
- Susan Tse as Cheng Long-hei (鄭朗喜), the youngest of the Cheng siblings and one of four founding members of Tung Tai. Fearing that Miss Kau would take full control of Tung Tai, she is willing to do anything to destroy her and assists her nephew Siu-hong to become the next leader of Tung Tai.
- Kwok Fung as Cheng Long-hung (鄭朗熊), the second oldest of the Cheng siblings. He is one of the four founding members of Tung Tai, and works with Miss Kau in hopes of converting Tung Tai into a legal business.
- Ben Wong as Cheng Siu-hong (鄭少康), Miss Kau's younger brother who wants to take over his sister as the only successor of Tung Tai.
- Henry Lo as Choi Tai-fung (蔡大鳳), Kwan's brother-in-law and one of the four founding members of Tung Tai who works with Long-hei and Siu-hong to take down Miss Kau.
- Helen Ma as Chow Teet (周鐵), known as Sister Teet (鐵姐). She is one of the four founding members of Tung Tai, and Miss Kau's loyal subordinate.
- Kara Wai as Ng Lai-sim (吳麗嬋), known as Mrs. Yeung, Yeung Yeung's mother who is the owner and landlord of the Chu Lung Lane apartment.
- Elena Kong as Chiu Tung-nei (趙冬妮), Sing's wife and later ex-wife who falls for Leung Fei-fan's manipulation.
- King Kong as Colonel Mukaiyama Tetsuya (向山鐵也; むかいやまてつや), a Japanese general who, after invading Canton, seeks out Miss Kau for an opium business collaboration.
- Nancy Wu as Ma Lai-wah (馬麗華), a spoiled, narrow-minded college student who is the daughter of Mui Lan-heung, Miss Kau's close childhood friend. With dreams of being a wealthy socialite, she goes against Miss Kau's wishes and marries Cheng Long-kwan to be his young concubine.
- Li Shing-cheong as Wong Man-fai (黃文輝), nicknamed Dr. Wong Luk (黃綠), a patriotic yet unlicensed doctor who lives with Mrs. Yeung as one of her tenants.
- Eileen Yeow as Lee Yuk-king (李玉琼), known as Mrs. Wong, Wong Luk's wife.
- Simon Lo as Che Wing-ping, nicknamed Big Che (大車), Sing's housemate at Chu Lung Lane and a member of his police crew.
- Kelvin Leung as Che Wing-on, nicknamed Small Che (細車), Big Che's younger brother, and a member of Sing's police crew.

== Marketing ==
Promotional events were held at Olympian City, East Point City and several other local shopping complexes throughout October to November 2010. Sheren Tang returned to Hong Kong from filming New My Fair Princess for most of the events including TVB's Lighting Ceremony to promote the drama as an anniversary series with the rest of the cast. Wayne Lai, Fala Chen, and Ngo Ka-nin also attended an event and radio program in Kuala Lumpur on 1 October 2010. Several cast members including Tang, Lai, and Ngo also did multiple interviews on TVB's afternoon talk show, The Green Room.

In 2011, Tang and Lai also did interviews and held concert events internationally at Casino Rama in Toronto and Genting in Kuala Lumpur in June and November respectively. In September, the two were seen in Taiwan promoting the series at Shilin Night Market and on a TVBS cooking program, in addition to attending the Shanghai premiere event.

== Release & Reception ==
=== Critical response ===
The series was highly acclaimed by critics and audiences as one of the best TVB dramas ever created, one of few Hong Kong drama series to have stood against the test of time and to have aged well. At the time, it was the highest-rated TVB drama of 2010, at a rating of 9.2 out of 10 on the Chinese website Douban, surpassing the rating of 8.7 for Rosy Business. As of 2021, after new interest in the series when a potential fourth instalment was announced, the rating rose to 9.3, tying with two other series, The Greed of Man and War of the Genders as one of the highest-rated Hong Kong dramas. As of February 2022, the rating stands at 9.4, becoming the highest-rated Hong Kong drama of all time.

Although No Regrets has more elements of romance than Rosy Business, the writers kept them to a minimal. This choice along with Sheren Tang and Wayne Lai's onscreen chemistry were highly praised as the undying and unspoken love between the main leads, Cheng Kau-Mui and Lau Sing, felt much stronger than a typical romance and was very well received while some believed there could have been more romantic elements. Some younger viewers questioned if the two characters' relationship was considered romantic or just a strong friendship. Tang and Lai responded that although there are romantic feelings between the characters, neither contemplated it due to the turbulent timing and their different statuses. This relationship between the characters, dubbed as SingKau (醒九) by netizens, continues to have an active dedicated fanbase. On the other hand, people felt that the romance between the second leads Fala Chen and Raymond Wong's characters was dry and draggy. One of the series’ few criticisms was Chen's character's death and funeral, as it was deemed too long taking up the first half of episode 31, which aired as part of the finale. Audiences felt that the finale was touching while some felt that it was too tragic for a TVB drama but still gave very positive reviews.

The drama was praised for being 'fresh' and different from other significant dramas including Rosy Business since the first series focused on internal family conflict, a common theme among TVB series. No Regrets, however, featured additional themes including war, rivalry, righteousness, love for one's country and history which has not been seen before in Hong Kong dramas. Also, the style of directing, editing and even the music have gone way beyond the standard of Hong Kong dramas, with many people liking it to an epic movie. The acting skills of Tang, Lai, and Ngo Ka-nin were praised for being versatile and vastly different from their characters in the prequel Rosy Business. Mak Cheung-ching was also given credit for playing such a hated character so convincingly that his catch-phrase "My name Leung Fei Fan will be written backwards!" became widely used. Many actors who were cast as Japanese soldiers in No Regrets did not have a Japanese background, but persevered in learning and using Japanese to film their scenes without needing to be voice dubbed. Their professionalism won the praise of both viewers and the producer Lee himself.

However, viewers found that the props and set used were incorrect and unconvincing for the 1930s and 1940s and did not bring out the chaotic times of that era, largely due to the lack of budget. For example, cars and trains from the wrong decades were used and some parts of the Japanese Army's uniforms such as shoes and guns were incorrect. Despite No Regrets' high anticipation and more complex plot, it was said to have had an even lower budget than Rosy Business. The drama's female lead, Tang, had also commented on the production investment.

=== Accolades ===
The drama and cast received eleven TVB Anniversary Award nominations, winning five of them. After winning the Best Actor and Best Actress awards for Rosy Business, Wayne Lai and Sheren Tang successfully defended their titles based on their brilliant performance in this drama respectively. Lai became the second actor to win the Best Actor award consecutively after Gallen Lo in 1997 and 1998, while Tang became the first actress in TVB to win the Best Actress award consecutively. Both of them became the first ever couple in TVB's history to win the awards consecutively based on the same drama franchise. In addition, the series also won Best Supporting Actress for Fala Chen, Best Supporting Actor for Mak Cheung-Ching, and Most Improved Male Artiste for Raymond Wong Ho-yin.

After sweeping the main acting awards in the 2010 TVB Anniversary Awards ceremony, No Regrets was expected to take home the Best Drama award. However, the award went to romantic comedy drama Can't Buy Me Love unexpectedly, to audible gasps and shocking everyone who was present including the presenter of the award, acclaimed film director Johnnie To who said before opening the envelope, "It's probably that one. Even the clapping and cheering sounds different" (referring to the loud cheers from the audience when the nomination clip for No Regrets aired) and was visibly shocked saying "What? It's not actually" after he opened the envelope. It was later revealed the series had lost by 1 vote from one of six voting shareholders, Tommy Leung, who had originally voted for The Mysteries of Love before a second round of voting was called to which he changed his vote. This led viewers to theorize that the decision was likely due to No Regrets' prequel Rosy Business winning over Can't Buy Me Love's prequel Beyond the Realm of Conscience the year prior and No Regrets having already swept the other major awards since the network has a regular habit of dividing awards, such as creating the My Favourite Character Award, which is often simply given to the actor and actress who did not win Best Actor and Best Actress. Complaints were lodged immediately after the ceremony ended to TVB directly and online, with many saying that No Regrets should have won because of its high ratings as well as critical acclaim and better plot. The result is largely considered one of the biggest snubs for the Best Drama Award.

Meanwhile, No Regrets also gained other awards and achievement, including winning all four Mingpao Weekly awards for TV programmes for a second year in a row following Rosy Business' sweep, the first Shanghai Television Festival nominations for a Hong Kong TV drama for Tang and Lai and two awards for Chen and Mak at the Asian Television Awards.

=== Viewership ===
The series debuted on 18 October 2010 Mondays to Fridays at 8:30 pm with the cast holding a special celebration dinner. The premiere averaged 32 points, 4 points higher than Rosy Business' 28 points and peaked at 36 points. Average ratings continued to rise in the later weeks. The finale episode, which aired as a two-hour special on Sunday 28 November 2010, had over 3 million Hong Kong TV live viewers, over 40% of the population of Hong Kong in 2010 and resulted in an unprecedented zero share of ratings for rival Asia Television, which was airing a gospel programme at the time. The finale was aired alongside the finale of sitcom Some Day. TVB aired a special celebratory program before and after the finales under the name <天晴豪情熱滿城>, conducting interviews and games with the cast from both series. Several shops and restaurants in Hong Kong were spotted closing early, posting signs citing returning home to watch the finale as its reason.

Even though the drama peaked at 47 points, one of the highest for TVB dramas during that time, many had expected the drama to reach 50 points for the finale and a higher overall rating for the series. It is likely that the 8:30 time slot had an effect on the overall ratings as many people in Hong Kong do not return home from work until later, which is why dramas placed in the 9:30 time slots tend to have higher viewership ratings. This decision was originally in part due to Gun Metal Grey, the other anniversary series airing at 9:30, being deemed too violent and mature for the earlier time slot. Also, the plot of the finale was leaked in multiple tabloid magazines weeks beforehand. In addition, streaming was just becoming popular, with TVB's online service MyTV releasing new episodes hours after live broadcast for the first time. The drama attracted an unprecedented additional 3,739,955 clicks within the following few days on MyTV, 5 times runner-up Some Day, and the highest ever in MyTV record. Each episode attracted more than 1 to over 2 million clicks on average.

It also received the best rating in the Guangzhou region, with 17.1 million viewers and 60% share of ratings; the runner-up at 1.57 million viewers, had 5% share of ratings.

== Viewership ratings ==
The following is a table that includes a list of the total ratings points based on television viewership. "Viewers in millions" refers to the number of people, derived from TVB Jade ratings (including TVB HD Jade), in Hong Kong who watched the episode live. The peak number of viewers are in brackets.

| Week | Episode(s) | Average points | Peaking points | Viewers (in millions) | AI | References |
|---|---|---|---|---|---|---|
| 1 | 1 | 32 | 36 | 2.07 (2.33) | — | |
| 1 | 2 — 5 | 31 | 34 | 2.01 (2.20) | 94% | |
| 2 | 6 — 10 | 31 | 34 | 2.01 (2.20) | 93% | |
| 3 | 11 — 15 | 32 | 35 | 2.07 (2.27) | 94% | |
| 4 | 16 — 20 | 33 | 37 | 2.14 (2.40) | 95% | |
| 5 | 21 — 24 | 34 | 38 | 2.20 (2.46) | 95% | |
| 6 | 25 — 29 | 34 | — | 2.20 (—) | 94% | |
| 6 | 30 | 35 | 36 | 2.27 (2.40) | 94% | |
| 6 | 31 | 44 | 47 | 2.85 (3.05) | 98% | |

== Indirect Sequels ==
=== No Reserve (2016) ===
The drama was such a huge success that talks of having a third sequel with the original cast and crew were under way. The proposed drama, tentatively named as Rosy Business III, was slated to start filming in April 2012. Plans originally fell through as the drama's screenwriter, Cheung Wah Biu, decided he would not be returning to TVB with Lee saying that he is unable to do another one without Cheung. TVB later announced in September 2012 that there will be another screenwriter, Ip Kwong-yam, to helm the script. Plans were resumed, with the new female leading role being played by Myolie Wu because Sheren Tang was unavailable due to scheduling conflicts in addition to her contract at an end with TVB in 2012. Lee also stated that he had trouble writing a story for Lai and Tang again after two successful series and could not think of a third story for them. This decision received a lot of criticism as many fans said Tang was irreplaceable in the franchise, as many threatened to boycott the series. Most of the supporting cast did not return either due to scheduling conflicts and producers wanting a younger cast.

Filming for Rosy Business III began in March 2013. It was finally released under a low profile as No Reserve in December 2016 after being put on hold for over 3 years due to sensitive content, with several episodes cut from television broadcast and only released on TVB's streaming service MyTV 2 months earlier. Viewership averaged at 20 points, the lowest rated TVB produced series of the year 2016. Audiences were disappointed with the poor plot, one-dimensional characters, and unnecessary, overused sexual violence, with fans disregarding the series as part of the franchise. It garnered a 3.9 rating at the time of broadcast and currently holds a 4.2 rating on Douban, a far contrast to No Regrets' 9.4 rating and Rosy Business' 8.7 rating.

=== No Return (TBA) ===
News of a fourth sequel began in November 2020 with sources stating that filming will begin in March 2021 with Lai and Tang set to return with new cast members Rebecca Zhu, Gabriel Harrison, and Pinky Cheung. New creator, Dave Fong Chun Chiu, who previously directed episodes for Rosy Business and No Regrets, said that the project is in the works but nothing had been confirmed.

In January 2021, it was announced that filming would be delayed due to COVID-19 pandemic travel restrictions. Wayne Lai confirmed that both Tang and screenwriter Cheung Wah Biu will be returning. News of Mayanne Mak joining the cast was reported in April 2021 but she clarified stating that while she hopes to join the series, it is still in early development and only Lai and Tang have been confirmed. In the same report, it was said Susan Tse and Pierre Ngo would make a return to the franchise. In late April 2021, it was reported that Him Law has been cast opposite of Zhu as second leads with production set to start in August 2021.

Despite massive excitement and enthusiasm from audiences and returning fans, on 19 July 2021, news outlets reported that collaborations with Chinese streaming platform Youku had fallen apart when the company exited the project after reading the first 3 episodes of the script. Due to TVB's decline in viewership over the years, with drama Murder Diary hitting a new low and a new change in management, all projects in pre-production were revamped or may be scrapped including Rosy Business 4 but Lai later reassured netizens via live streams that the project is still in development.

In late August 2021, it was reported the project will go ahead with filming set to start in March 2022 after investment problems were solved, but Zhu may no longer be involved. Lai posted a new photo on Weibo of Tang and himself in September 2021. Although their meetup was unrelated to the project, it went viral and netizens took the new post as a hint for their return to the franchise, with several entertainment news outlets claiming both Lai and Tang will return for the series.

However, on 18 October 2021, Tang hosted a 90-minute live broadcast with Lai on Weibo in celebration of No Regrets' 11th anniversary where she openly addressed Rosy Business 4 for the first time. Both actors downplayed reports and said that they are hopeful but warned fans not to be overexcited as it will likely not reach such high expectations. They encouraged fans that they will do their best but if in the end, they are unable to film the series, there must be a reason and there will be future opportunities to work together. The live broadcast had over 1.35 million viewers and the topic began trending immediately on the platform afterwards as netizens discussed the revelation.

In January 2022, Lai told reporters that the project is still in development and hopes the project can start production by the end of the year.

On 14 March 2022, TVB officially announced the drama as 1 of 4 sequels and 1 of 14 dramas in pre-production at the FILMART event under the Chinese title "巾幗梟雄之懸崖" and English title No Return. The series will reportedly have 30 episodes. Both Tang and Lai have been vocal about their dedication to the project and about waiting for production to begin in late 2022. By the end of 2022, none of the proposed sequels TVB announced back in March had begun production, but are reportedly still in development.

In August 2023, it was announced the project is confirmed to begin filming in Hengdian as a co-production with Tencent and in September 2023, it was confirmed that Tang will not be returning. She confirmed through a lengthy post on social media explaining her decision, which was largely in part due to a past unhappy filming experience and the multiple delays and cancellations of the project. It was announced that Nancy Wu will take her place as lead actress. It was met with immediate backlash with fans stating that it is a completely different project and should not be associated with the franchise. The only returning cast members will be Susan Tse and Henry Lee from the original two projects and Edwin Siu from the third project. New cast members include Hera Chan, Joey Law, Gabriel Harrison and Lisa Ch'ng. Episode count was reduced to 25 with production beginning on 7 October 2023 and ending two months later on 17 December 2023.

== Historical elements ==
The period drama follows the lives of fictional characters in the Chinese city of Canton (Guangzhou) between 1936 and 1949. With Wayne Lai portraying the righteous police officer Lau Sing and Sheren Tang portraying Cheng Kau Mui (Miss Kau), a good-willed daughter of a triad boss holding a facade as a drug lord to save people, No Regrets includes some of the biggest issues and historical events during the time when the drama is set. It focuses on opium, a drug that many Chinese suffered addiction from at the time, supplied by notorious dealers. Corrupt police who feared triads are portrayed in the drama.

In addition, No Regrets focuses on the Japanese Occupation of China in 1937 and portrays the lives of Chinese citizens, mainly in Canton, during the occupation. The Attack on Pearl Harbor, Japanese Occupation of Hong Kong and Philippines in 1941 and 1942 are also mentioned. One of the songs heard on the radio in the drama, The Sword March, was an actual patriotic song first sung during this time to honour those who fought in the Marco Polo Bridge Incident, which was also mentioned in the drama. After the defeat of the Japanese Imperial Army in 1945, the country faces an economic crisis before civil war ensues, which, as portrayed at the latter part of the drama, affects the triads and directly affects Miss Kau; she held a facade as a ruthless opium dealer and a woman who cooperated with the Japanese Imperial Army for an opium business, when the new government of the Chinese Communist Party takes control, establishing the People's Republic of China in 1949.

The period drama therefore portrays life in Canton before the Sino-Japanese War during the mid-1930s, the Japanese Occupation between 1937 and 1945, the civil war and the establishment of the People's Republic of China which brings the drama to a climax as the leads who share a romantic relationship are split apart in 1949. Miss Kau, a former notorious drug dealer and "traitor" to the country, flies to Honolulu via Hong Kong, and Lau Sing, who, after a twist of fate, remains in Mainland China with amnesia, joins the Korean War of the early 1950s, restores his memory and attempts unsuccessfully to swim to Hong Kong and leave for Honolulu to seek his beloved Miss Kau after the gates were closed between Mainland China and Hong Kong. The drama concludes with Miss Kau and Lau Sing reuniting in 1979 in Canton, and living life together in the early 1980s in Hong Kong and travelling around the world.

== Awards and nominations ==
| Year | Awards | Category | Nominee(s) | Result | Ref. |
|---|---|---|---|---|---|
| 2010 | My AOD Favourites Awards | My Favourite Drama Series | No Regrets | Nominated | |
| 2010 | My AOD Favourites Awards | My Favourite Actor in a Leading Role | Wayne Lai | Nominated | |
| 2010 | My AOD Favourites Awards | My Favourite Actress in a Leading Role | Sheren Tang | Nominated | |
| 2010 | My AOD Favourites Awards | My Favourite Actor in a Supporting Role | Raymond Wong Ho-yin | Nominated | |
| 2010 | My AOD Favourites Awards | My Favourite Actor in a Supporting Role | Ngo Ka-nin | Won | |
| 2010 | My AOD Favourites Awards | My Favourite Actress in a Supporting Role | Fala Chen | Won | |
| 2010 | My AOD Favourites Awards | My Favourite Actress in a Supporting Role | Susan Tse | Nominated | |
| 2010 | My AOD Favourites Awards | My Favourite Actress in a Supporting Role | Kara Hui | Nominated | |
| 2010 | My AOD Favourites Awards | My Favourite Actress in a Supporting Role | Nancy Wu | Nominated | |
| 2010 | My AOD Favourites Awards | Top 10 Favourite Character | Wayne Lai as Lau Sing | Won | |
| 2010 | My AOD Favourites Awards | Top 10 Favourite Character | Sheren Tang as Cheng Kau-mui | Won | |
| 2010 | 43rd TVB Anniversary Awards | Best Drama | No Regrets | Nominated | |
| 2010 | 43rd TVB Anniversary Awards | Best Actor | Wayne Lai | Won | |
| 2010 | 43rd TVB Anniversary Awards | Best Actress | Sheren Tang | Won | |
| 2010 | 43rd TVB Anniversary Awards | Best Supporting Actor | Raymond Wong Ho-yin | Nominated | |
| 2010 | 43rd TVB Anniversary Awards | Best Supporting Actor | Ngo Ka-nin | Nominated | |
| 2010 | 43rd TVB Anniversary Awards | Best Supporting Actor | Mak Cheung-ching | Won | |
| 2010 | 43rd TVB Anniversary Awards | Best Supporting Actress | Fala Chen | Won | |
| 2010 | 43rd TVB Anniversary Awards | My Favourite Male Character | Wayne Lai as Lau Sing | Nominated | |
| 2010 | 43rd TVB Anniversary Awards | My Favourite Female Character | Sheren Tang as Cheng Kau-mui | Nominated | |
| 2010 | 43rd TVB Anniversary Awards | Most Improved Actor | King Kong Lee | Nominated | |
| 2010 | 43rd TVB Anniversary Awards | Most Improved Actor | Raymond Wong Ho-yin | Won | |
| 2010 | YAHOO! Asia Buzz Awards | Most Popular Theme Song Award | Yi Hoi Hou Ching 義海豪情 | Won | |
| 2010 | YAHOO! Asia Buzz Awards | Most Popular Drama Award | No Regrets | Won | |
| 2011 | Next Magazine TV Awards | Top 10 Artist | Wayne Lai | Won | |
| 2011 | Next Magazine TV Awards | Top 10 Artist | Sheren Tang | Won | |
| 2011 | Next Magazine TV Awards | Top 10 Artist | Fala Chen | Won | |
| 2011 | Next Magazine TV Awards | Top 10 Drama | No Regrets | Won | |
| 2011 | 17th Shanghai Television Festival | Best Actor | Wayne Lai | Nominated | |
| 2011 | 17th Shanghai Television Festival | Best Actress | Sheren Tang | Nominated | |
| 2011 | China TV Drama Awards | Most Popular Actress (Hong Kong/Taiwan) | Sheren Tang | Won | |
| 2011 | 2nd StarHub TVB Awards | Top 5 Favourite TVB Male Character | Wayne Lai as Lau Sing | Won | |
| 2011 | 2nd StarHub TVB Awards | Top 5 Favourite TVB Female Character | Sheren Tang as Cheng Kau-mui | Won | |
| 2011 | 2nd StarHub TVB Awards | Top 5 Favourite TVB Female Character | Fala Chen as Lau Ching | Won | |
| 2011 | 2nd StarHub TVB Awards | Most Improve Actor award | King Kong Lee | Won | |
| 2011 | 2nd StarHub TVB Awards | My Most Favourite TVB Drama | No Regrets | Won | |
| 2011 | 43rd Ming Pao Anniversary Awards | Most Outstanding TV Programme | No Regrets | Won | |
| 2011 | 43rd Ming Pao Anniversary Awards | Most Outstanding TV Actor | Wayne Lai | Won | |
| 2011 | 43rd Ming Pao Anniversary Awards | Most Outstanding TV Actress | Sheren Tang | Won | |
| 2011 | 43rd Ming Pao Anniversary Awards | Most Outstanding TV Back-stage crew | Cheung Wah-Biu (張華標), Chan Ching-Yee (陳靜儀) | Won | |
| 2011 | 16th Asian Television Awards | Best Actor in a Supporting Role | Mak Cheung-ching | Won | |
| 2011 | 16th Asian Television Awards | Best Actress in a Supporting Role | Fala Chen | Won | |

=== Notes ===
a. Only 10 episodes of No Regrets had been broadcast in Malaysia when voting closed for the My AOD Favourites Awards.

b. When the nomination list was announced for the Shanghai Television Festival, No Regrets had not yet officially aired in mainland China.

== International broadcast ==
| Location | Network | Broadcast Date |
|---|---|---|
| Hong Kong | TVB Jade | 18 October 2010 |
| Malaysia | Astro On Demand | 18 October 2010 |
| Malaysia | Astro Wah Lai Toi | 21 November 2011 |
| Malaysia | 8TV | 28 November 2012 |
| Australia | TVBJ | 25 October 2010 |
| Singapore | StarHub TV | 17 May 2011 |
| Singapore | Channel U | 14 February 2013 |
| Taiwan | TVBS Entertainment Channel | 2 September 2011 |
| Taiwan | China Television | 5 September 2011 |
| Taiwan | TVBS Entertainment Channel | 9 February 2013 |
| China | Dragon TV | 1 September 2011 |
| China | Dragon TV | 10 September 2011 |
| China | CCTV-1 | 19 September 2011 |
| South Korea | TVB Korea Channel | September 2011 |
| United States | TVB Entertainment | 21 November 2011 |
| United States | TVB2 | 21 November 2011 |
| Canada | Fairchild TV | 4 November 2011 |
| Europe | TVB Europe | October 2010 |

== See also ==
- Rosy Business
- List of No Regrets characters
- List of No Regrets episodes

== Notes ==
- a. "Red Butterfly" is the ending theme song for the series finale only. The original version, sung by Ron Ng, is the theme song for Rosy Business.
