= Beauty Knows No Pain =

Hong Kong television series

- Official poster
- 女人最痛
- Genre: Drama
- Created by: Lam Chi-wah
- Written by: Suen Ho-ho; Chan Kam-ling
- Starring: Michelle Yim; Maggie Cheung; Joe Ma; Joyce Tang; Dominic Lam; Power Chan
- Theme music composer: Fergus Chow
- Country of origin: Hong Kong
- Original language: Cantonese
- No. of episodes: 20

Production
- Producer: Lam Chi-wah
- Production location: Hong Kong
- Camera setup: Multi camera
- Running time: 45 minutes
- Production company: TVB

Original release
- Network: TVB Jade
- Release: 26 July – 10 August 2010

Beauty Knows No Pain
- Title screen shot
- Traditional Chinese: 女人最痛
- Simplified Chinese: 女人最痛
Transcriptions
Standard Mandarin
- Hanyu Pinyin: Nǚ Rén Zuì Tòng
Yue: Cantonese
- Jyutping: Neoi5 Jan2 Zeoi3 Tung4

Beauty Knows No Pain (Chinese: 女人最痛) is a 2010 Hong Kong television drama. Produced by Lam Chi-wah and co-edited by Suen Ho-ho and Chan Kam-ling, the drama is a TVB production. The show premiered on July 26, 2010, and is slated to air for 20 episodes five nights a week. The drama follows the lives of three women — Mrs. Cash, Jackie and BiBi, portrayed by Michelle Yim, Maggie Cheung Ho-yee, and Joyce Tang respectively — who work in the same cosmetics production company, Paris Donna San-Malo Donna (PDSD).

== Synopsis ==
Mrs. Cash (Michelle Yim) is successful in both career and life. She knows that her husband and mother-in-law would like her to bear children, so despite earlier miscarriages as well as her age, she is willing to take the risk of getting pregnant. However, she accidentally discovers that her husband Mr. Cash (Dominic Lam) has committed adultery. Pregnancy has imposed great pressure on her daily life as well as her career. Her aggressive subordinate Jackie (Maggie Cheung Ho-yee) therefore seizes the chance to take up her duties. Jackie is a bold and decisive person at work but she is caught in a quadrangular relationship by falling in love with the married man Nick (Joe Ma).

Discouraged by the relationship failures of her bosses, secretary BiBi (Joyce Tang) further impairs her confidence. Bibi's "outstanding" body shape, further increases her inferiority. Encouraged by her colleague Chi Lam (Power Chan), BiBi decides to boost her self-esteem by getting plastic surgery. Subsequently, she becomes the sexiest goddess on the Internet and the hottest brand spokesperson in town. Upon her getting rich and famous, BiBi suddenly realizes that this is not what she really wants.

== Cast and characters ==
=== Main characters ===
- Michelle Yim portrays Noble "Mrs. Cash" Wong, the senior brand manager for Lafa, later FMCG. Unlike Jackie, she manages to balance both family and work successfully without much effort. Mrs. Cash, despite having gone through two miscarriages as well as years of unsuccessful conceptions, she finally gets pregnant, but at a risk due to her older age. She discovers that Mr. Cash is having an affair with Stephy, a model who is in contract with PDSD. While going through a rough divorce, Mrs. Lafa, the original owner of the brand, is manipulated into disliking her and wants to buy the brand back. In order to please Mrs. Lafa so that she will not acquire Lafa back from PDSD, Jackie conspires to take over as brand manager for Lafa whilst Noble is asked to be senior brand manager of FMCG.
- Joe Ma portrays Nickson "Nick" Ko, the young marketing director for PDSD. Intelligent, rational, and confident, Nick is a well-liked and respected talent in the marketing industry. Nick is also extremely faithful and filial; he was once Jackie's longtime boyfriend. However, Jackie suddenly heartlessly broke up with him, to reasons he never knew until he met Jackie again four years later in PDSD. Under the pressure of his parents, Nick marries Yeda, a longtime friend. He later discovers that Yeda is bisexual, and that she still has feelings for her ex-lover. Yeda decides that she wants a divorce, causing Nick to feel ashamed. With the support of Jackie, Nick regains his self-confidence; he and Yeda amiably divorce. After his marriage with Yeda, he slowly finds himself again attracted to Jackie, leading to a start, once again, in a relationship. Nick wants to marry Jackie and start a family with her, but Jackie is too headstrong in her career, thus leading Nick to be betrayed by Jackie as she fights for the position as CEO.
- Maggie Cheung Ho-yee portrays Jackie Sha, the brand manager for Stella Young, and both Stella Young and Lafa later. Impressed with Mrs. Cash's quick-thinking, patience, and wisdom, Jackie sees Mrs. Cash as her mentor and good friend. With Mrs. Cash's pregnancy setback and Angela's sly schemes to take down both Lafa and Stella Young, Jackie becomes over-stressed and aggressive, and coincidentally becomes responsible for both brands. Jackie soon takes over Mrs. Cash's position as senior brand manager. She is an ambitious person as she insists in fighting with Noble to obtain post of CEO of Asia Pacific Operations. To cope with her corporate reorganization plan, she decides to remove the whole Marketing Department and lay off all staff inside, including her boyfriend, Nickson. Although she finally wins the CEO post, it leads to the break-up with Nickson.
- Joyce Tang portrays BiBi Yue, Mrs. Cash's secretary, later a model. Although she is often being poked fun of by her fellow male co-workers due to her less-than-average looks and body, she is extremely kind and naive. She is the first to befriend Jackie after she joins PDSD. Chi Lam convinces BiBi to get plastic surgery, and she becomes extremely popular. Furious with Jackie's "betrayal" toward Mrs. Cash, she stops becoming friends with Jackie and chooses to work with Mrs. Cash again, who now works for a smaller brand, FMCG, due to Jackie's takeover. She was given the nickname 'E cup Bibi'.
- Dominic Lam portrays Vincent "Mr. Cash" Chin, the CEO of a trading company. His father died at an early age, leaving only his mother to care for him. Using his own powerful socializing and networking skills, Mr. Cash quickly forms his own trading company. He loves children. After several miscarriages - one of which was caused by the stress on Mrs. Cash finding out that Mr. Cash was having an affair - Mrs. Cash becomes pregnant. It is soon revealed that Mr. Cash has been having an affair with a young model named Stephy (portrayed by Yoyo Chen), and Mrs. Cash pushes for a divorce. Mr. Cash has made it clear that if she is unwilling to reunite with him, he will fight for her custody.
- Power Chan portrays Chi Lam, the marketing manager for PDSD. Chi Lam is flirty and obnoxious, often poking fun at BiBi's appearance. Despite Chi Lam's stingy personality, he is shown to be a good friend and a filial grandson, often caring for Nickson and his grandmother. He is extremely tactful and skilled. He soon finds himself falling for Bibi for her good nature and personality.

=== Other characters ===
- Elena Kong portrays Angela "Angela Auntie" Hung the brand manager for Purple Queen, who is a villain. She is sneaky and sly, and has many plans up her sleeves to bring down Mrs. Cash, although none of these plans seem to usually work. She often has to stay after work with GM and kisses GM to get what she wants. Finally she was fired after spreading rumours of the side effects of using Lafa cosmetics.
- Savio Tsang portrays "GM" Lam Gar-man, the CEO of PDSD, the supervisor of Nobel Wong, Nickson Ko, Angela Hung, Jackie Sa and Chi Lam. GM is unimaginative and is easily convinced by others. However, he holds great respect for his subordinates, and chooses his aides wisely. And also likes Angela Hung very much.
- Gordon Liu portrays Ng Lap-chau, a cook who owns a restaurant next to Mrs. Cash's home. Afraid that his restaurant business would affect her baby, she tries several times to kick him out of the neighborhood. After witnessing her divorce as well as the stress she receives from work, Lap-chau begins to sympathize with her, and the two become great friends.
- JJ Jia portrays Yeda So, Nick's wife. Bubbly and lively, Yeda is optimistic and naturally gullible. She is attracted to Nick's intelligence and mannerisms, quickly falling in love with him. After their marriage, the couple's personalities often clashed. Although she is faithful to Nick, she still has feelings for her ex-lover, Michelle. Nick and Yeda later divorce.
- Yoyo Chen portrays Stephy, a primary villain of the series, Vincent Chin's mistress and Noble Wong's love rival, and also Wong's archenemy. She determined and desperate to make sure that Wong was received the unnecessary consequences, which actually started the rivalry by herself. She and her elder sister, Teresa, were orphans in Singapore. She works as a model.
- Jess Shum portrays Teresa, Stephy's elder sister. She was an orphan in Singapore. She used to be a disco dancer to earn a living.
- Elaine Yiu portrays Pinky Wong, Stella Young's brand manager in last episode after Jackie becomes the Asia Pacific CEO.
- Suet Nei (雪妮) as Jackie Sha's mother
- Chun Wong (秦煌) as Nickson "Nick" Ko's father
- Mimi Chu as Nickson "Nick" Ko's mother
- Dia Yiu Ming as BiBi Yue's ex-boyfriend

== Viewership ratings ==
	Week	Episodes	Average points	Peaking points	HK viewers (in millions)	References
1	July 26 — 30, 2010	1 — 5	28	31	1.78	
2	August 2 — 6, 2010	6 — 10	27	—	1.72	
3	August 9 — 13, 2010	11 — 15	27	29	1.72	
4	August 16 — 20, 2010	16 — 20	29	—	1.84	

== Awards and nominations ==
=== TVB Anniversary Awards 2010 ===
- Nominated: Best Drama
- Nominated: Best Actress (Michelle Yim)
- Nominated: Best Actress (Maggie Cheung)
- Nominated: My Favorite TV Female Character (Michelle Yim)

== International Broadcast ==
- Malaysia - 8TV (Malaysia)
