= Three Kingdoms RPG =

Hong Kong television series

- Promotional poster
- Genre: Historical fiction science fiction
- Starring: Kenneth Ma; Raymond Lam; Tavia Yeung; Ruco Chan; Lau Kong; Ha Yu; Law Lok-lam; Joseph Lee; Pierre Ngo; Cilla Kung
- Opening theme: "Waiting for Your Return" (等你回來) by Raymond Lam
- Country of origin: Hong Kong
- Original language: Cantonese
- No. of episodes: 25

Production
- Executive producer: Lau Kar-ho
- Production location: Hong Kong
- Camera setup: Multi camera
- Running time: 45 minutes (per episode)
- Production company: TVB

Original release
- Network: TVB Jade
- Release: 9 July – 10 August 2012

Three Kingdoms RPG
- Traditional Chinese: 回到三國l="Back to the Three Kingdoms"
Transcriptions
Standard Mandarin
- Hanyu Pinyin: Huí Dào Sānguó
Yue: Cantonese
- Jyutping: Wui4 Dou3 Saam1 Gwok3

Three Kingdoms RPG is a 2012 Hong Kong television series produced by TVB, with Lau Kar-ho serving as the drama's executive producer. It stars Kenneth Ma as Szema Shun, a young Hong Kong game addict, who accidentally travels back in time to the Three Kingdoms period of Chinese history.

== Plot ==
Vincent Szema (Kenneth Ma) is a game addict who goes back to the Three Kingdoms period and meets many historical figures. He becomes Zhuge Liang's trusted advisor and utilizes modern strategies to overcome issues and obstacles. Vincent then develops feelings for a female servant in the kingdom of Shu. Vincent is able to maintain contact with his sister through his smart phone and learns that a time warp will take place at the Battle of Chibi.

== Cast ==
Note: Some of the characters' names are in Cantonese romanisation.

=== Main cast ===
- Kenneth Ma as Vincent Szema Shun (司馬信), a Hong Kong youth who accidentally travels back in time to the Three Kingdoms period.
- Raymond Lam as Chugot Leung (諸葛亮), Liu Bei's strategist
- Tavia Yeung as Song-yau (桑柔), a maid who serves Lau Bei's family. She becomes Shun's love interest.

=== Suk Hon (蜀漢) ===
- Joseph Lee as Lau Bei (劉備), a warlord who founded Suk Hon
- Au Sui-wai as Kwan Yu (關羽), a general under Lau Bei, second sworn brother to Lau Bei and Zhang Fei.
- Savio Tsang as Cheung Fei (張飛), a general under Lau Bei, third sworn brother to Lau Bei and Guan Yu.
- Deno Cheung as Chiu Wan (趙雲), a general under Lau Bei

==== Lau Bei household ====
- Rachel Kan as Lady Kon (甘夫人), Lau Bei's first wife
- Iva Law as Lady Mei (麋夫人), Lau Bei's second wife
- Annie Chong as Cho Kuk (鶵菊), a maid in Lau Bei's household
- Doris Chow as a maid in Lau Bei's household
- Siu Hoi-yan as a maid in Lau Bei's household
- Lydia Law as a maid in Lau Bei's household
- Cheung Wai-yi as a maid in Lau Bei's household
- Tsang Yuen-sa

=== Cho Ngai (曹魏) ===
- Law Lok-lam as Cho Cho (曹操), Prime Minister
- Ram Chiang as Sun Yuk (荀彧), Cho Cho's strategist
- Chan Wing-kei as Kai Hui (賈詡), Cho Cho's strategist

=== Tung Ng (東吳) ===
- Pierre Ngo as Suen Kuen (孫權), Tung Ng's head of state
- Ruco Chan as Chow Yu (周瑜), a talented military general and strategist who serves the Suen family
- Alice Fung So-bor as Lady Ng (吳夫人), Suen Kuen's mother
- Sharon Chan as Siu-kiu (小喬), Chow Yu's wife.

=== Lau Piu household ===
- Mary Hon as Lady Choi (蔡夫人), Lau Biu's wife
- Jack Wu as Lau Kei (劉琦), Lau Biu's older son
- Vin Choi as Lau Chung (劉琮), Lau Biu's younger son

=== Others ===
- Henry Lee
- Man Yeung
- Jonathan Cheung as Fan Gan, Szema Shun's good friend
- Lau Kong as Lau Biu
- Kaki Leung as Wong Yuet-ying (黄月英), Chugot Leung's wife
- Lee Yee-man as Hau-lin (巧蓮), Wong Yuet-ying's maid
- Lee Chung-hei as Chui Ho (崔浩), Chugot Leung's friend
- Bond Chan as Shek Kwong-Yuen (石廣元), Chugot Leung's friend
- Jess Sum
- Ha Yu as Szema Shun's father
- Cilla Kung as Szema Kuen (司馬娟), Szema Shun's younger sister

== Viewership ratings ==
The following is a table that includes a list of the total ratings points based on television viewership.

Week	Originally Aired	Episodes	Average Points	Peaking Points	References
1	9 July 2012	1	30	34	
1	July 9 – July 13, 2012	1–5	30	35	
2	July 16 – July 20, 2012	6–10	31	35	
3	July 23 – July 27, 2012	11–14	34	45	
4	July 30 – August 3, 2012	15–19	27	—	
5	August 6 – August 9, 2012	20–23	29	—	
5	August 10, 2012	24–25	31	36	
