= Fly with Me (TV series) =

- Official poster
- 飛女正傳
- Genre: Modern Comedy-Action
- Written by: Chow Yuk Ming
- Starring: Ada Choi; Moses Chan; Raymond Cho; Kenny Wong
- Country of origin: Hong Kong
- Original language: Cantonese
- No. of episodes: 25

Production
- Producer: Jonathan Chik
- Running time: 45 minutes (approx.)

Original release
- Network: TVB
- Release: April 19 – May 22, 2010

Fly With Me
- Traditional Chinese: 飛女正傳
- Simplified Chinese: 飞女正传
Transcriptions
Standard Mandarin
- Hanyu Pinyin: Fēi nǚ zhèng zhuàn
Yue: Cantonese
- Jyutping: fei1 neoi5 zeng3 cyun4

Fly With Me (Traditional Chinese: 飛女正傳) is a TVB modern comedy-action series.

== Synopsis ==
Leung Hau-Chi or Yvonne (Ada Choi) is a career woman in her 30s who is portrayed as fussy, arrogant and easily irritated by the sight of beautiful young women. Desperate for love and for something exciting to happen in her life, Chi is miserable and begins to despair when she abruptly transforms into a superwoman of incredible charm and strength.

Chi uses her powers to fight crime and help others. During her adventures, she meets three men: Yeung Ho-Yin (Kenny Wong), a police officer; Tsu Wing-Fai (Raymond Cho), a businessman; and Kan Ming-Hin (Moses Chan), a plastic surgeon. Ming-Hin develops romantic feelings for both Chi and her superhero alter ego. Meanwhile, Chi struggles to navigate her romantic relationships.

== Cast ==
Cast	Role	Description
Ada Choi	Leung Hau Chi (Yvonne) 梁巧芝	Age 35; Superwoman (identity is Janet Bin). Tsui Wing Fai's secretary. Kan Ming Hin's patient for facial plastic surgery. Gam Sou Fan's daughter
Moses Chan	Kan Ming Hin (Wallace) 簡明軒	Age 36; Plastic surgeon. Leung Hau Chi's surgeon. Gains super powers in the last episode, and assumed a superhero identity as Wong Kam Bei Lei (Golden Billy / Golden Ratio)
Raymond Cho	Tsui Wing Fai (Frankie) 徐永暉	Age 36; Leung Hau Chi, Cathy's subordinate. Yung Bak Keui's son Went to jail on ep. 12
Kenny Wong (黃德斌)	Yeung Ho Yin (Edmond) 楊浩然	Age 36; CID. Admires Leung Hau Chi.
Queenie Chu	Kwok Hiu Lam (Cathy) 郭曉琳	Office Clerk. Leung Hau Chi's office mate
Catherine Chau (周家怡)	Tsang Cheuk Nga (Selina) 曾綽雅	Yeung Ho Yin's girlfriend
Rachel Kan (簡慕華)	Tong Mei Si (Macy) 唐美詩	Kan Ming Hin's ex-girlfriend
Chan Hung Lit	Yung Bak Kui (Richard) 容伯駒	Age 65; Tsui Wing Fai's father Jiu Fung Hing's husband
Ching Hor Wai (程可為)	Gam Sou Fan 甘素芬	Age 57; Leung Hau Chi's mother
Manna Chan (陳曼娜)	Tse Yung Yung 謝蓉蓉	Age 65; Kan Ming Hin's mother
Wai Ka Hung (韋家雄)	Cheung Wai Seun 張偉信	Age 36; Plastic surgeon
Helen Ma (馬海倫)	Jiu Fung Hing 趙鳳卿	Yung Bak Keui's wife
Lily Ho (何傲兒)	Apple	Office Employee
Josephine Shum (岑寶兒)	Helen	Office Employee
Lo Mang	Lo Jan Keung 羅振強	Admires Leung Hau Chi; Appeared in jail ep. 12

== Awards and nominations ==
TVB Anniversary Awards (2010)

- Nominated - Best Drama
- Nominated - Best Actress (Ada Choi)
- Nominated - Best Supporting Actor (Kenny Wong)
- Nominated - Best Supporting Actor (Raymond Cho)
- Nominated - Best Supporting Actress (Queenie Chu)
- Nominated - My Favourite Female Character (Ada Choi)

== Viewership ratings ==
	Week	Episodes	Average Points	Peaking Points	References
1	April 19–23, 2010	1 — 5	27	29	
2	April 27–29, 2010	6 — 8	27	—	
3	May 3–7, 2010	9 — 13	26	—	
4	May 10–14, 2010	14 — 18	26	27	
5	May 17–21, 2010	19 — 23	26	—	
5	May 22, 2010	24 — 25	29	—	
