= Ngo Ka-nin =

Hong Kong actor, singer and host

Pierre Ngo Ka-nin
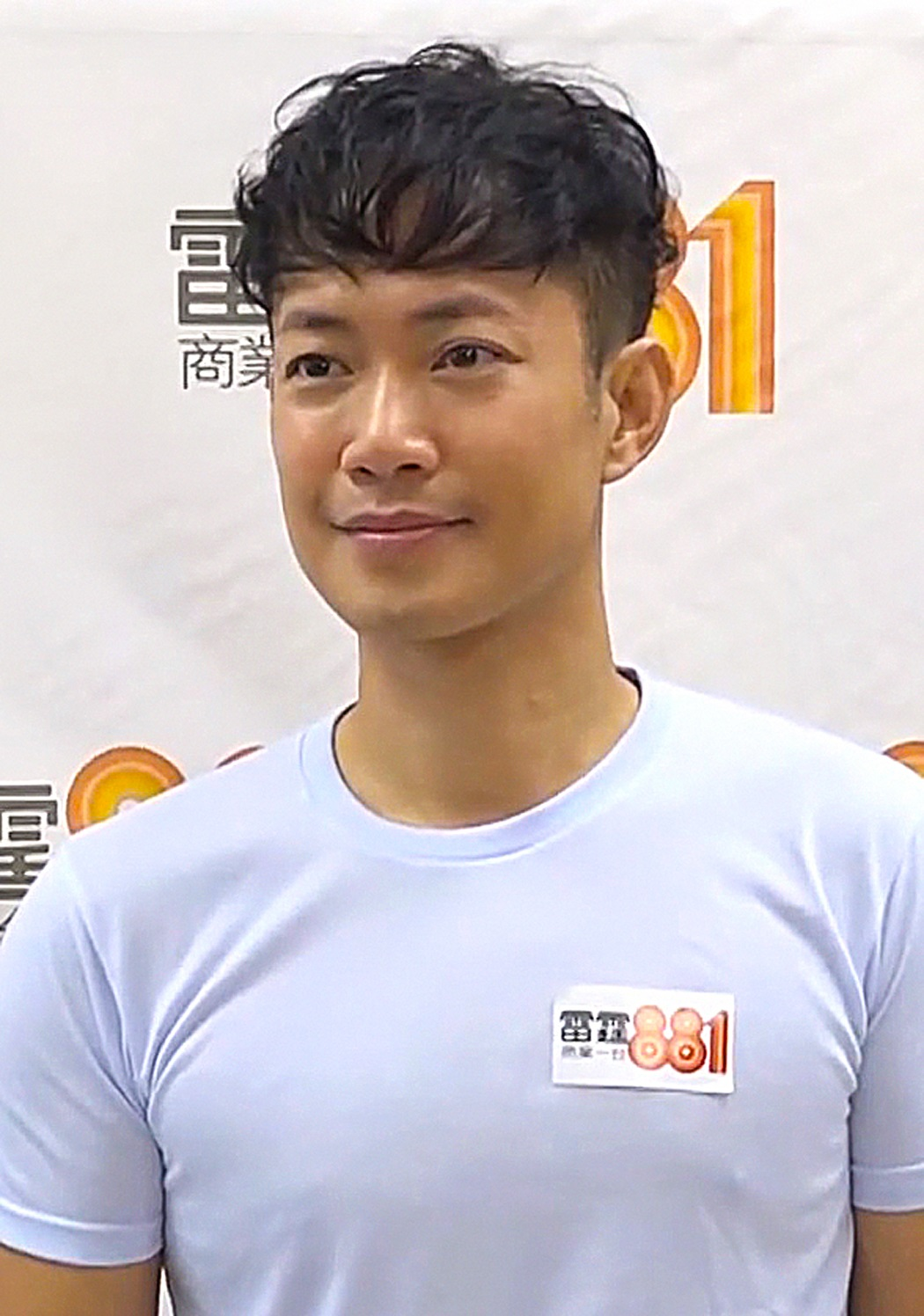
- Ngo in 2020
- Born: 26 September 1976 (age 49); British Hong Kong
- Occupations: Actor; television host
- Years active: 1998–present
- Spouse: Betty (m. 2016; div. 2019)
- Awards: TVB Anniversary Awards – TVB Anniversary Award for Most Improved Male Artiste; 2009 Rosy Business

Chinese name
Transcriptions
Standard Mandarin
- Hanyu Pinyin: Áo Jiānián
Yue: Cantonese
- Jyutping: Ngou^{4} Gaa^{1} Nin^{4}
- Musical career
- Also known as: Pierre Ngo

Ngo Ka-nin
- Chinese: 敖嘉年
Transcriptions
Standard Mandarin
- Hanyu Pinyin: Áo Jiānián
Yue: Cantonese
- Jyutping: ngou4 gaa1 nin4

Pierre Ngo Ka-nin (Chinese: 敖嘉年, born 26 September 1976) is a Hong Kong actor, singer and host.

== Career ==
Ngo debuted as a radio DJ before he got into acting. He has also been one of the hosts for the entertainment news show, E-Buzz, since 2005 to 2007.

Ngo is best known for his role as Chiang Bit-man in the 2009 drama Rosy Business, which earned him the Most Improved Male Artiste award and a Best Supporting Actor nomination at the 2009 TVB Anniversary Awards. His popularity got a further boost when he delivered a sterling performance as Tong Kat in direct sequel No Regrets. He became a strong contender for the Best Supporting Actor award.

Ngo left TVB due to pay on 26 January 2020, but has continued working under a per series contract with the first series being Fraudstars, where he starred as the male lead for the first time with the network.

== Personal life ==
There have been conflicting reports about his age with some stating that he was born in the year 1976. In the reality program Midlife Crisis which was filmed and aired on ViuTV in mid 2020, Ngo stated that he is 47 years old, which meant he was born in 1972.

Ngo married longtime girlfriend, Betty, in 2016. He revealed in 2022 that they divorced amicably over 3 years ago after Ngo was spotted hanging out with Fraudstars costar Angel Chiang, but also clarified that he and Chiang are only friends.

== Filmography ==
Film
Year	Film	Role	Notes
2009	Turning Point	Lo Fai	
2010	Ip Man 2	Leung Kan	
2010	Perfect Wedding	Wing	
2011	I Love Hong Kong		
2016	Time Raiders		
2019	Iron Fist		
2019	Ip Man 4	Leung Kan	
Television
Year	Title	Role	Notes
2001	Gods of Honour	Muk-tsa	
2002	Love is Beautiful	Chiu Hei	
2002	Lofty Waters Verdant Bow	Leung Leung-hong	
2003	The 'W' Files	Wong Tong	
2003	Riches and Stitches	Koon Ling-shing's subordinate	
2004	The Vigilante in the Mask	Ching Shek-chuen	
2004	War and Beauty	Wong Fuk-sau	
2004	The Conqueror's Story	Emperor Yi of Chor	
2005	Love Bond	News reporter	
2005	The Charm Beneath	Chuk Yau-bong	
2005	Always Ready	Hong Yau-wah	
2006	Lethal Weapons of Love and Passion	Yip So-tung	
2006	Under the Canopy of Love	Lung	
2006	Forensic Heroes	Tam Wai-sing	
2006	Au Revoir Shanghai	Yau Chap-pak	Warehoused
2007	Best Bet	Tsang Tak—kin	
2007	The Ultimate Crime Fighter	Toby Kwan Tik-on	
2007–8	Survivor's Law II	Fan Tsan-ting	
2008	Wars of In-Laws II	Joe	
2008	The Four	Hung King	
2009	Rosy Business	Chiang Bit-man	TVB Anniversary Award for Most Improved Actor; Nominated — TVB Anniversary Award for Best Supporting Actor (Top 5); Nominated — Mingpao Magazine Entertainment Award for Most Outstanding Male Artiste
2009	Sweetness in the Salt	Wu Ting-fai	TVB Anniversary Awards for Most Improved Actor
2010	The Season of Fate	Kwan Chit-yim	
2010	Growing Through Life	young Hoi Leung	
2010	The Comeback Clan	Horace Ngai Chi-on	
2010	No Regrets	Tong Kat (Spareribs)	My AOD Favourite TVB Drama Award for My Favourite Supporting Actor; Nominated — TVB Anniversary Award for Best Supporting Actor (Top 5)
2011	A Great Way to Care	Yuen Man-hon / Yuen Man-ho	Episodes 6–9
2011	The Rippling Blossom	Yue Chi-po	
2011	My Sister of Eternal Flower	Mike Luk Ho-cheong	
2011	River of Wine	Sung Chi-tsun	Nominated — TVB Anniversary Award for Best Supporting Actor (Top 15)
2012	Tiger Cubs	Chan Lik-hang	Episode 6: "Attacking the Fruit Market"
2012	Three Kingdoms RPG	Suen Kuen	
2012	King Maker	Prince Chiu Kwai-sing	
2013	Bullet Brain	Sergeant Pau Ping-on	
2013	Always and Ever	Yuen Kwai	Nominated - TVB Star Awards for My Best Supporting Actor; Nominated - TVB Anniversary Award for Best Supporting Actor(Top 10)
2014	Queen Divas	Lin Chi-kit	
2014	Ghost Dragon of Cold Mountain	Ngau Dai-lik	
2014	All That Is Bitter Is Sweet	Dou Yung	
2015	Ghost of Relativity	Charlie	
2015	Lord of Shanghai	Mo Kwun-chiu	
2016	Speed of Life	Wing Tak-him	
2016	The Last Healer in Forbidden City	Emperor Guangxu	
2017	My Dearly Sinful Mind	Wu Tin-Yeung (Win Sir)	
2017	The Unholy Alliance	Ricky Ling Ka-chau	
2019	ICAC Investigators 2019	Cheung Tat-chuen	
2019	As Time Goes By	Young Chai Yik-cheung	Episode 3
2021	Shadow of Justice	Tai Ching-yan	
2021	Fraudstars	Chan Chi-yeung	Nominated - TVB Anniversary Award for Best Actor; Nominated - TVB Anniversary Award for Most Popular Onscreen Partnership (with Lawrence Cheng, Angel Chiang, Sammi Cheung, Kirby Lam, Vincent Lam and Enson Lau); Nominated — TVB Anniversary Award for Favourite TVB Actor in Malaysia
2022	The Righteous Fists	Kam Yiu-lung	

=== Television shows ===
Year	Title	Chinese title	Network	Role
2020	Midlife Crisis	中佬唔易做	ViuTV	EP5-8

Awards and achievements
TVB Anniversary Awards
Preceded by Wong Cho Lam for Best Selling Secrets; Super Trio Supreme; D.I.E.; Miss Hong Kong 2008	Most Improved Actor; 2009 for Rosy Business; Sweetness in the Salt	Succeeded by Raymond Wong Ho-yin for A Watchdog's Tale; When Lanes Merge; Can't Buy Me Love; No Regrets
