= 2012 in Hong Kong television =

The following is a list of Hong Kong television programmes in 2012. The list includes television drama and variety programme debuts and endings.

== Top ten serial dramas in ratings ==
The following is a list of Hong Kong's highest-rated serial dramas of 2012 according to the drama's average ratings. The list also includes the ratings of the dramas' premiere and finale weeks, finale episode, as well as the average overall count of Hong Kong viewers (in millions) per drama. Rating figures are rounded to the nearest number.

Highest-rating serial dramas of 2012
Rank	English title	Chinese title	Producer	Average	Peak	Premiere	Finale	Finale episode	HK viewers
1	Witness Insecurity	護花危情	TVB	32	37	30	33	34	TBA
2	Divas in Distress	巴不得媽媽...	TVB	31	36	30	33	33	TBA
3	The Hippocratic Crush	On Call 36小時	TVB	31	39	29	33	37	1.97
4	Three Kingdoms RPG	回到三國	TVB	30	45	30	30	31	TBA
5	Daddy Good Deeds	當旺爸爸	TVB	30	34	30	33	31	TBA
6	The Greatness of a Hero	盛世仁傑	TVB	30	36	28	31	32	1.95
7	Gloves Come Off	拳王	TVB	30	35	29	31	34	TBA
8	Ghetto Justice II	怒火街頭2	TVB	30	39	28	30	29	TBA
9	King Maker	造王者	TVB	29	38	27	31	33	TBA
10	House of Harmony and Vengeance	耀舞長安	TVB	29	35	29	30	33	TBA

== TVB ==
=== Serial drama debuts ===
Premiere date	Drama	Network(s)	Cast and crew	Genre	Ref.
3 January	Wish and Switch 換樂無窮	Jade and HD Jade	Lam Chi-wah (producer); Chan Kam-ling, Leung Yan-tung (writers); Myolie Wu, Johnson Lee, Selena Li, Vincent Wong	Comedy-drama	
3 January	L'Escargot 缺宅男女	Jade and HD Jade	Nelson Cheung (producer); Lau Choi-wan, Suen Ho-ho (writers); Michael Miu, Michael Tse, Sonija Kwok, Linda Chung, Ron Ng, Joyce Tang, Mandy Wong, Him Law, Oscar Leung	Drama	
30 January	Let It Be Love; 4 In Love	Jade and HD Jade	Jonathan Chik (producer); Chow Yuk-ming (writer); Charmaine Sheh, Moses Chan, Kenny Wong, King Kong, Florence Kwok, Elvina Kong, Tracy Ip, Wi Kar-hung	Romance	
13 February	The Hippocratic Crush; On Call 36小時	Jade and HD Jade	Poon Ka-tak (producer); Kenneth Ma, Tavia Yeung, Him Law, Mandy Wong, Benjamin Yuen, Candy Chang	Medical drama	
27 February	Queens of Diamonds and Hearts 東西宮略	Jade and HD Jade	Wong Wai-sing (producer); Wong Kwok-fai (writer); Roger Kwok, Fala Chen, Sharon Chan, Louis Yuen, Ben Wong	Costume drama, Fantasy	
19 March	Daddy Good Deeds 當旺爸爸	Jade and HD Jade	Miu Siu-ching (producer); Leung Man-wah, Leung Wing-mui (writers); Ha Yu, Steven Ma, Linda Chung, Edwin Siu, Mak Cheung-ching, Nancy Wu, Cilla Kung, Chow Chung	Comedy-drama	
2 April	The Greatness of a Hero 盛世仁傑	Jade and HD Jade	Leung Choi-yuen (producer); Ka Wai-nam (writer); Kent Cheng, Sunny Chan, Sonija Kwok, Bernice Liu, Wayne Lai, Lee Heung-kam, Rebecca Chan, Leila Tong	Historical fiction	
16 April	Gloves Come Off 拳王	Jade and HD Jade	Marco Law (producer); Cheung Yeuk-sze, Cheung Chung-yan (writers); Kevin Cheng, Raymond Wong Ho-yin, Selena Li, Natalie Tong, Kenny Wong, Nancy Wu	Action drama	
30 April	House of Harmony and Vengeance 耀舞長安	Jade and HD Jade	Nelson Cheung (producer); Lau Choi-wan (writer); Bobby Au-yeung, Myolie Wu, Linda Chung, Mak Cheung-ching	Costume drama	
14 May	Come Home Love 愛·回家	Jade and HD Jade	Tsui Yu-on (producer); Sandy Shaw, Sin Chui-ching (writers); Lau Dan, Tsui Wing, Lai Lok-yi, Yvonne Lam, Florence Kwok, Carlo Ng, Angel Chiang, Joey Law, Queenie Chu	Sitcom	
21 May	Master of Play 心戰	Jade and HD Jade	Jonathan Chik (producer); Chow Yuk-ming (writer); Adam Cheng, Moses Chan, Kenny Wong, Maggie Shiu, Aimee Chan	Crime drama, thriller	
11 June	No Good Either Way 衝呀！瘦薪兵團	Jade and HD Jade	Amy Wong (producer); Lau Chi-wah (writer); Ruco Chan, Kristal Tin, Louis Yuen, Stephen Au, Florence Kwok, Jason Chan	Comedy-drama	
24 June	Tiger Cubs 飛虎	Jade and HD Jade	Lam Chi-wah (producer); Lee Yee-wah (writer); Joe Ma, Jessica Hsuan, Him Law, Oscar Leung, Vincent Wong, Mandy Wong	Police procedural, action	
2 July	Witness Insecurity 護花危情	Jade and HD Jade	Lau Kar-ho (producer); Choi Ting-ting (writer); Bosco Wong, Linda Chung, Paul Chun	Romance, thriller	
9 July	Three Kingdoms RPG 回到三國	Jade and HD Jade	Lau Kar-ho (producer); Lau Chi-wah, Wong Yuk-tak (writers); Raymond Lam, Kenneth Ma, Tavia Yeung, Ha Yu, Sharon Chan, Ngo Ka-nin	Historical fiction, science fiction	
30 July	Ghetto Justice II 怒火街頭II	Jade and HD Jade	Tommy Leung, Joe Chan (producers); Kevin Cheng, Myolie Wu, Sam Lee, Elena Kong, Alex Lam, Raymond Cho, Mak Cheung-ching, Christine Kuo	Legal drama	
13 August	King Maker 造王者	Jade and HD Jade	Leung Choi-yuen (producer); Kent Cheng, Wayne Lai, Ngo Ka-nin, Lai Lok-yi, Kristal Tin, Natalie Tong, Elaine Yiu, Kingdom Yuen, Florence Kwok	Historical fiction	
27 August	Divas in Distress 巴不得媽媽...	Jade and HD Jade	Poon Ka-tak (producer); Liza Wang, Gigi Wong, Chin Kar-lok, Him Law, Mandy Wong, Eliza Sam, Chung King-fai, Mimi Choo, Koo Ming-wah	Comedy drama	
17 September	The Last Steep Ascent 天梯	Jade and HD Jade	Lee Tim-sing (producer); Moses Chan, Maggie Cheung Ho-yee, Kenny Wong, Aimee Chan, Helena Law, Edwin Siu, Cheung Kwok-keung, Elliot Ngok	Period drama	
24 September	Highs and Lows 雷霆掃毒	Jade and HD Jade	Lam Chi-wah (producer); Michael Miu, Raymond Lam, Kate Tsui, Elaine Ng, Ella Koon, Ben Wong, Derek Kok, Jin Au-yeung, Alex Lam, Law Lok-lam	Police procedural, action	
22 October	Silver Spoon, Sterling Shackles 名媛望族	Jade and HD Jade	Chong Wai-king (producer); Damien Lau, Idy Chan, Tavia Yeung, Kenneth Ma, Ron Ng, Rebecca Zhu, Elena Kong, Mary Hon, JJ Jia, Vincent Wong, Sire Ma, Shek Sau, Ben Wong	Period drama	
5 November	The Confidant 大太監	Jade and HD Jade	Marco Law (producer); Wayne Lai, Michelle Yim, Maggie Shiu, Raymond Wong Ho-yin, Aimee Chan, Nancy Wu, Edwin Siu, Raymond Cho, Natalie Tong, Oscar Leung	Historical fiction	

=== Serial drama endings ===
Premiere date	Drama	Network(s)	Cast and crew	Genre	Ref.
1 January	When Heaven Burns 天與地	Jade and HD Jade	Jonathan Chik (producer); Chow Yuk-ming (writer); Bowie Lam, Moses Chan, Charmaine Sheh, Maggie Shiu, Kenny Wong, Elaine Jin, Chan Hung-lit, Queenie Chu	Drama	
2 January	Bottled Passion 我的如意狼君	Jade and HD Jade	Lee Tim-shing (producer); Chan Ching-yee (writer); Niki Chow, Raymond Wong Ho-yin, Elaine Yiu, Katy Kung, Raymond Cho, Claire Yiu, Rebecca Chan, Kwok Fung, Joel Chan, Jack Wu	Period drama	
13 May	Til Love Do Us Lie 結·分@謊情式	Jade and HD Jade	Kwan Wing-chung (producer); Pang Mei-fung, Poon Man-hung (writers); Eddie Cheung, Kiki Sheung, Joyce Tang, Hanjin Tan, Lin Xiawei, Benjamin Yuen, Susan Tse, Bowie Wu	Sitcom	

=== Variety programme debuts ===
Premiere date	Drama	Network(s)	Genre	Ref.
4 January	Open Sesame 開館有益	Jade	Informational	
9 January	Nihon Oishi 勁食日本一	Jade	Food and travel	
21 January	My 2011 我的2011	Jade	Biographical	
24 January	New Spring Menu 2012 新春自家菜	Jade	Food	
29 January	I Know Men 芝人口面不知心	J2	Talk show	
30 January	What Fine Couples 登登登對	Jade and HD Jade	Game show	
19 February	Battle of the Senses 五覺大戰	Jade and HD Jade	Game show	
20 February	The Amur River 黑龍江	Jade	Travel show	
26 February	Lipstick Circle 三個女人一個墟	Jade	Talk show	
10 March	When in Taiwan 台灣闖蕩	J2	Travel show	
12 March	The Sun Rises Still 嘯後瀛風	Jade and HD Jade	Travel show	
20 March	Pretty Soup Brewers 靚人靚湯	Jade and HD Jade	Food	
2 April	Actor Singer Giver 細說新馬	Jade	Informational	
4 April	Itching for Kimchi 大韓好Kimchi	Jade	Food and travel	
9 April	Bride Wannabes 盛女愛作戰	Jade and HD Jade	Reality show	
14 April	Here Come the Bride Wannabes 盛女駕到	Jade and HD Jade	Talk show	
22 April	Master So Food 食得峰騷	Jade	Food	
23 April	Number Matters; 700萬人的數字	Jade and HD Jade	Game show	
30 April	Lost in Macau 澳門足跡	Jade	Informational	
4 June	Homecoming 回鄉	Jade	Game show	
6 June	Goodies Upstairs 樓上有寶	Jade	Informational	
1 July	Map of Happiness 快樂地圖	Jade	Travel show	
9 July	Big Fun on Little Rocks 小島怡情	Jade	Travel show	
23 July	TV Funny 玩轉三周1/2	Jade and HD Jade	Game show	
13 August	Treasure Hunt at Double Cove 迎海尋珍奪寶	Jade and HD Jade	Reality show	
20 August	Roman at Heart 羅文·歌在人心	Jade	Informational	

=== Variety programme endings ===
End date	Drama	Network(s)	Genre	Ref.
14 January	My Sweets 甜姐兒	Jade and HD Jade	Food	
18 February	Top Eats 100 香港美食100強	Jade and HD Jade	Food	
3 March	Star Under the Moon 內蒙的紅月亮	J2	Game show	
8 April	Cook Away Lady May; May姐有請	Jade and HD Jade	Food	

== ATV ==
=== Serial drama debuts ===
Premiere date	Drama	Network(s)	Cast and crew	Genre	Ref.
30 January	My Depraved Brother 義本同心	ATV Home	Kwong Yip-sam (producer); Michael Tao, Deric Wan, Wu Xiubo, Shu Chang, Coffee Lu, Akina Hong, Eddy Ko, Berg Ng, Ken Lok	Drama	
20 March	Heart's Beat for Love 親密損友	ATV Home	Gary Tang (producer/writer); Kelvin Kwan, Zac Kao, Wylie Chiu, Yedda Chiu, Charmaine Fong, Coffee Lu, Hana Tam	Sitcom	

=== Variety programme debuts ===
Premiere date	Drama	Network(s)	Genre	Ref.
3 January	Director Ko's Blog 高志森微博	ATV Home and ATV Asia	Informational	
30 January	ATV 100 Celebrities 亞視百人	ATV Home	Documentary	
3 March	Southern Canton Green Path 漫遊嶺南綠道	ATV Home	Food, game show	
16 April	Vision International Finance 國際財經視野	ATV Home and ATV Asia	Informational	
22 April	The Policy Debate 政策大辯論	ATV Home and ATV Asia	Talk show	

== RTHK ==
=== Serial drama debuts ===
Premiere date	Drama	Network(s)	Cast and crew	Genre	Ref.
25 February	Elite Brigade 火速救兵II	Jade	Cheng Wai-fong (producer); Chin Siu-ho, Lam Wai, Gordon Liu, Yoyo Mung, Him Law, Ella Koon, Kelvin Kwan, Dominic Lam, Wilfred Lau, Gabriel Harrison, Lawrence Chou	Action drama	
