= Love Guaranteed (TV series) =

- Love Guaranteed poster
- 愛情全保
- Genre: Modern Drama
- Starring: Sunny Chan; Melissa Ng; Kenneth Ma; Paul Chun; Cherie Kong
- Opening theme: "Let It Flow" by Stephy Tang
- Country of origin: Hong Kong
- Original language: Cantonese
- No. of episodes: 20

Production
- Running time: 45 minutes (approx.)

Original release
- Network: TVB
- Release: July 17 – August 11, 2006

Love Guaranteed (Traditional Chinese: 愛情全保) is a TVB modern drama series broadcast in July 2006.

== Cast ==
Cast	Role	Description
Sunny Chan	Kwok Fu-Keung (Ken) 郭富強	Insurance Agent; Kuk Yeuk-Hei's lover. Kwok Fu-Kan and Kwok Dak-Mei's brother.
Melissa Ng	Kuk Yeuk-Hei (Hazel) 谷若晞	Insurance Agent; Kwok Fu-Keung's lover. Ng Mei-Kei's cousin.
Kenneth Ma	Kwok Fu-Kan (Tim) 郭富勤	Kwok Fu-Keung and Kwok Dak-Mei's younger brother. Ng Mei-Kei's lover.
Cherie Kong (江芷妮)	Ng Mei-Kei (Maggie) 伍美琪	Kuk Yeuk-Hei's cousin. Kwok Fu-Kan's lover.
Paul Chun	Kwok Shing 郭醒	Kwok Fu-Keung, Kwok Dak-Mei and Kwok Fu-Kan's father.
Rain Lau (劉玉翠)	Kwok Dak-Mei (Renee) 郭德美	Kwok Fu-Keung and Kwok Fu-Kan's older sister. Hoh Cheung-Dok's lover.
Manna Chan	Hoh Kim-Chau 賀劍秋	Ng Mei-Kei's mother. Hoh Cheung-Dok's older sister.
Chiang Chi Kwong (蔣志光)	Hoh Cheung-Dok 賀長鐸	Hoh Kim-Chau's younger brother. Kwok Dak-Mei's lover.
Angela Tong	Siu Wan 蕭雲	

== Viewership ratings ==
	Week	Episode	Average Points	Peaking Points	References
1	July 17–21, 2006	1 — 5	30	32	
2	July 24–28, 2006	6 — 10	32	—	
3	July 31 - August 4, 2006	11 — 15	33	35	
4	August 7–11, 2006	16 — 20	34	36	
