= Bachelors at War =

- 求愛大作戰
- Directed by: Ying Shum 岑應
- Country of origin: Hong Kong
- Original language: Cantonese
- No. of episodes: 15

Production
- Producer: Chi Ming Cheung 張志明
- Production locations: Hong Kong; Lumbok, Indonesia
- Running time: 20-23 minutes per episode

Original release
- Network: TVB Jade; HD Jade
- Release: 10 June – 28 June 2013

Bachelors At War is a reality show created by Television Broadcast Limited and hosted by Queenie Chan. It was broadcast weekday nights from 22:30 to 23:00 on Jade and HD Jade starting 10 June 2013 and was reviewed on Mytv.com for two months.

This show focused on a group of middle-class men, described as “highly eligible bachelors" selected through social networking websites and a matchmaking company, trying to find spouses. They had to stand out during the evaluation conducted by the adjudicators, who were “Beauty Expert” Queenie Chan, Stylist Karl Hui and other experts. At the end, only eight men were “qualified” to be the bachelors.

The eight contestants were Vincent, who had never dated any Hong Kong girls; Justin, an extroverted and confident Chinese Canadian; Thomas, with no dating experience; Cyrus, who swore not to be a die-heart suitor; Rocky, a muscular man with an unappealing face; Winter, with a well-paid job but perceived as a freak; Chris, who was working in disco but didn't like "play girl" and Guy, an intelligent PhD graduate.

On the other hand, six ordinary but elegant ladies were selected. They were going to be introduced to the bachelors via videos. After receiving modification of appearance assisted by Karl, the bachelors encounter a broad range of challenges. They were evaluated by the judges and the female contestants were eliminated from the show one by one until the best four bachelors selected. “The Best Four” were rewarded with travel to Indonesia along with the 6 females. Whether the females were impressed by the bachelors was supposedly all about the bachelors' sincerity and steadfastness.

== Content in each episode ==
In episode 3, game on. The first task was ‘date in the dark’, where they set in pairs in the dark. At last, the 8 men failed to impress the ladies since they had shown their weaknesses in the dark.

In episode 4, due to the unattractive men, 3 ladies quit the show (Carol, Mona and Evelyn). In order to regain the ladies’ interests, the 8 men underwent training to be the ‘Alpha Man’. For instance, training themselves to be more humorous. At last, Thomas won in this episode. Thomas was given a chance to have dinner with the team coach.

In episode 5, after the trainings, the 8 men entered a ball with the ladies. Through the ball, they had to show the results of training to impress the ladies, to make their confessions successful. At last, Chris was revealed to be a double agent who spied on men's attitudes from the very beginning, and he would leave the show with Winter, who failed in this challenge with no successful reply from his confessions.

Episode 6 focused on the training of Rocky and Cyrus. Rocky underwent cosmetic treatment on his pimples in order to look more attractive. While Cyrus sought advice from experts so that he could avoid being ‘friend-zoned’. Episode 7 focused on Thomas, Justin and Guy. Thomas tried to boost his confidence in speaking with girls through speed dating. Justin was given a day to spend time with a typical ‘Kong girl’, while Guy sought consultation to change his attitude.

In episode 8 and 9, the six pairs needed to go dating in a budget of $200 to find out if the men were creative and caring enough. Vincent took Alice to a nature park in mainland. Thomas and Jasmine went on painting. Rocky took Sharon to work for hawker stores to earn food. Guy simply took Whitey for a dinner while Justin and Vivien dined beside the river. Lastly Cyrus invited Sharon to film a video with him.

In episode 10, after having a talent show and a cooking class with the ladies, 4 men remained. Thomas and Vincent couldn't impress the ladies and they were eliminated.

In episode 11–15, the remaining contestants embarked on a journey to Lombok in Indonesia and engaged in different tasks, to win opportunities to spend time with their targets. During the trip, Vivian and Sharon stood out from the girls due to their mean personality. As a result, none of the men wanted them. Moreover, Carol returned to the show and became a contestant in episode 11 again.

After all the tasks and difficulties, the confessions of the 4 men wrapped up the show. Justin chose Carol but failed, Rocky and Guy chose Whitney. However, Whitey chose Rocky. Surprisingly, Cyrus chose Queenie, one of the judges and instructors of the show.

== Reception ==
=== Critical response ===
The show received a generally negative response from critics. Most netizens and newspapers described the behaviour of the contestants in the show as "disgusting and disquieting" and the attitude of judges as "unprofessional".

Moreover, the Communications Authority (CA) received 32 complaints about the show, mainly regarding Karl Hui, who was the stylist of the show. There were two more complaints about issues of sexual harassment.

== Controversy ==
=== Appearance of the Stylist ===
The appearance of Karl Hui was a major focus among the controversies. In the first episode, he was in a green dress with a chignon. His high pitched voice and feminine gestures also attracted media comment. The CA and TVB both received complaints about Hui, regarding these aspects of his appearance. The heated debate about his sexuality and the calling off of the show were widely discussed on online forums, such as Hong Kong Discuss, Golden Forum and Facebook.

=== Sexual harassment ===
Another judge and an 'expert' on relationships, Chan Ting Pong, also created a controversy about sexual harassment. Chan taught male contestants to perform ice-breaking techniques with females, through touching the woman's body. Soon afterwards a man was the subject of a complaint after following Chan's advice, and was charged with sexual assault. This case stirred up concerns in the public, including The Association Concerning Sexual Violence Against Women.

== See also ==
- Bride Wannabes
- List of programmes broadcast by Television Broadcasts Limited
