= When Lanes Merge =

- Official poster
- 情越雙白線
- Genre: Modern Drama
- Starring: Kent Cheng; Raymond Wong Ho-yin; Kate Tsui; Sonija Kwok; Lee Heung Kam; Raymond Cho
- Country of origin: Hong Kong
- Original language: Cantonese
- No. of episodes: 20

Production
- Camera setup: Multi-camera
- Running time: 45 minutes (approx.)
- Production company: TVB

Original release
- Network: TVB Jade
- Release: June 28 – July 23, 2010

Related
- Slow Boat Home (2013)

When Lanes Merge (Traditional Chinese: 情越雙白線) is a 2010 TVB modern drama series.

== Synopsis ==
Rushing along the road every day with a vibrant mix of passengers of all kinds, what taxi drivers see and hear is far more varied than one can ever imagine. Retired taxi driver Ho Kau (Kent Cheng) returns to the job after his son Ho Ka-po (Raymond Wong) was convicted for causing death by dangerous driving under the influence of alcohol. The incident has exacerbated the already fractious relationship between both father and son. Ho Ka-po works for Ho Kau after his release from prison. Before long, he has another serious road accident, in which Ho Kau is also involved and severely injured, both mentally and physically. Ho Ka-po feels so guilty towards his father and comes to understand the importance of careful driving. He maintains a high degree of vigilance while driving but still gets picked on constantly by female traffic police officer Ko Lai-Sam (Kate Tsui). As time goes by, the pair have gradually developed a strong attachment to each other and finally become lovers. But Ho Ka-po's ex-girlfriend Cheung Hiu-Man (Sonija Kwok) and Ko Lai-Sam's grandmother Ko Li Shuk-Ching (Lee Heung Kam) turn out to be the biggest obstacle to their relationship, leaving the pair stranded in dismay along the tunnel of love.

== Cast ==
=== The Ho Family ===
Cast	Role	Description
Kent Cheng	Ho Kau 何球	Age 56; Taxi driver Ho Ga-bo's father Cheung Hiu-man's God-father
Raymond Wong Ho-yin	Ho Ga-bo (Turbo) 何加寶	Age 28; Taxi driver, later auto maintenance technician Ho Kau's son Ko Lai-sum's boyfriend, then husband Cheung Hiu-man's ex-boyfriend Lei Suk-jing's ex-student Was in jail for 2 years after being guilty of dangerous driving

=== The Ko Family ===
Cast	Role	Description
Lee Heung Kam	Lei Suk-jing 李淑貞	Age 70; Ex-Principal; Ko Lai-sum's grandmother Ko Tin-yiu's mother Chiu Mei-kei's mother-in-law Ho Kau's good friend Ho Ga-bo, Cheung Hiu Man and Gwan Syu-yan's ex-principal
Ko Chun-man	Ko Tin-yiu 高天耀	Retired chief police inspector Lei Suk-jing's son Ko Lai-sum's father Chiu Mei-kei's husband
Alice Fung So-bor	Chiu Mei-kei 趙美琪	Retired police inspector Lei Suk-jing's daughter-in-law Ko Tin-yiu's wife Ko Lai-sum's mother
Kate Tsui	Ko Lai-sum 高麗芯 (Sammi)	Age 26; Traffic police, later Police Inspector; Lei Suk-jing's granddaughter Ho Ga-bo's girlfriend, then wife Ko Tin-yiu and Chiu Mei-kei's daughter Daisy's best friend Cheung Hiu-man's friend and rival

=== The Cheung Family ===
Cast	Role	Description
Ching Hor Wai	Yu Ngoi-hei 余愛喜	Age 50; Cheung Hiu-man's stepmother Cheung Hiu-ming and Cheung Hiu-ching's mother Chou Mei-wai's aunt
Sonija Kwok	Cheung Hiu-man 張曉雯	Age 28; Yu Ngoi-hei's stepdaughter Cheung Hiu-ming and Cheung Hiu-ching's elder sister Ho Ga-bo and Andy's ex-girlfriend Ho Kau's god-daughter Cheung Hiu-ching's older sister Chou Mei-wai's cousin Kou Lai-sum's friend and rival Lei Suk-jing's ex-student
Fred Cheng	Cheung Hiu-ming 張曉明	Pharmacist; Yu Ngoi-hei's son Cheung Hiu-man's younger brother Cheung Hiu-ching's elder brother Chou Mei-wai's cousin Used to cheat money from family to pay his debt (Semi-Villain)
Katy Kung	Cheung Hiu-ching 張曉晴	Age 18; Student; Yu Ngoi-hei's daughter Cheung Hiu-man and Cheung Hiu-man's younger sister Ngai San-san's friend Chou Mei-wai's cousin Leung Yat-dong's girlfriend then later broke up Used to be instigated by Leung Yat-dong (Semi-Villain)

=== The Au family ===
Cast	Role	Description
Raymond Cho	Au Yiu-jun 區耀進	Age 33; Taxi Driver; Chou Mei-wai's husband Au Tsz-him's father Ho Kau's friend
Elaine Yiu	Chou Mei-wai (Vivian) 曹美慧	Age 26; Au Yiu-jun's wife Au Tsz-him's mother Yu Ngoi-hei's niece Gwan Syu-yan's subordinate
Coleman Tam	Au Tsz-him 區子謙	Au Yiu-jun and Chou Mei-wai's son

=== The Ngai family ===
Cast	Role	Description
Kwok Fung	Ngai Chiu-fat 魏潮發	Age 50; Former restaurant owner, but later sold the restaurant to Ma Cheong-tat to pay his debt Chan Siu-fan's husband Ngai San-san's father Ho Kau's friend
Kingdom Yuen	Chan Siu-fan 陳笑芬	Age 42; Former restaurant owner, but later sold the restaurant to Ma Cheong-tat to pay Ngai Chiu-fat's debt Ngai Chiu-fat's wife Ngai San-san's mother
Angel Chiang	Ngai San-san 魏珊珊	Age 18; Student; Chan Siu-fan and Ngai Chiu-fat's daughter Cheung Hiu-ching's friend

=== Other cast ===
Cast	Role	Description
Eric Li	Leung Yat-dong 梁逸東	Karaoke shop owner Triad member Ho Ga-bo's friend Cheung Hiu-ching's boyfriend Killed Gwan Syu-yan in Chapter 18; Hit by a truck and became paralyzed in Chapter 19 (Main villain)
Ruco Chan	Gwan Syu-yan (Tony) 關樹人	Age 30; Finance company owner Triad member Chou Mei-wai's direct supervisor Lei Suk-jing's ex-student Killed by Leung Yat-dong in Chapter 18 (Main villain)
Tracy Ip	Daisy	Art Teacher; Used to be a traffic police with Ko Lai-sum; Ko Lai-sum's Best Friend; Hit by Gwan Syu-yan's car while on duty to cause paralysis
Stephen Huynh	Andy	Cheung Hiu-man's ex-boyfriend
Yu Mo-lin	Lee Sam-fung 李三鳳	Lei Suk-jing's housemaid
Lee Hung-kit	Ma Cheong-tat 馬昌達	Boss of taxi of a taxi agency and a restaurant
Lau Kwai-fong	Mrs. Ma	Ma Cheong-tat's wife Yu Ngoi-hei's friend
Raymond Tsang	Pang Yung 彭勇	Traffic police inspector Ko Lai-sum's direct supervisor

== Awards and nominations ==
TVB Anniversary Awards (2010)

- Nominated: Best Drama
- Nominated: Best Actor (Kent Cheng)
- Nominated: Best Supporting Actress (Kingdom Yuen)
- Nominated: Best Supporting Actress (Elaine Yiu)
- Nominated: My Favourite Male Character (Kent Cheng)
- Nominated: My Favourite Male Character (Raymond Wong)
- Nominated: Most Improved Actor (Raymond Wong)
- Nominated: Most Improved Actress (Elaine Yiu)

== Viewership ratings ==
	Week	Episodes	Average Points	Peaking Points	References
1	June 28 - July 2, 2010	1 — 5	30	31	
2	July 5–8, 2010	6 — 9	31	34	
3	July 12–16, 2010	10 — 14	32	32	
4	July 19–23, 2010	15 — 20	32	35	

== International Broadcast ==
- Malaysia - 8TV (Malaysia) 31 October 2012
