= Cherie Kong =

Hong Kong actress

Cherie Kong 江芷妮
- Education: Bachelor of Communication, Ohio University; Master of Business Administration, University of Hong Kong
- Spouse: Unknown (m. 2012)
- Children: 2

Cherie Kong Chi-nei (Chinese: 江芷妮), originally known as Cherie Kong Ka-yee (江家儀), is a Hong Kong actress and program host who debuted in 2001. Kong retired from the entertainment industry in 2007 and later entered the business world. She is currently the owner of a beauty salon.

== Summary ==
Kong attended St. Mark's School from 1989 to 1994, and transferred to the Commerce Department of Rosaryhill School from 1994 to 1996, where she studied the two-year Marketing course and graduated first in her class. Then she went to Ohio University in America to complete her bachelor's degree in communication and also studied in Japan. In 2000, Kong accompanied her friend to participate in the interview for the 2000 Miss Hong Kong Pageant and was later notified by TVB that she was shortlisted. However, Kong replied that she was not participating in the Miss Hong Kong pageant. In 2001, Kong auditioned again and joined TVB as an artiste. Her first job was as the host of the station's music program Very Music Space. In the same year, Kong signed a contract with Filmko Film and has participated in films such as Good Heart Love and Truth or Dare.

In 2007, after her contract with TVB expired, Kong retired from the entertainment industry and entered the business world. Using the cash prize of HK$1 million she won in the TVB Anniversary Show 2007, as well as over HK$300,000 in prize money she had won from participating in TVB game shows over the years, she established the beauty salon SkinPro in 2009. After transitioning into the beauty industry, Kong continued her studies and obtained a Master of Business Administration from the University of Hong Kong in 2011. She has also served as vice president and director of the Hong Kong Hairdressing and Beauty Association. Appointed by the Government as a member of the Beauty and Hairdressing Training Committee of the Vocational Training Council (Hong Kong) in 2023.

== Family ==
On June 16, 2012, Kong married her architect boyfriend and hosted a banquet with 13 tables at the InterContinental Hong Kong Hotel in Tsim Sha Tsui for relatives and friends. In 2019 and 2021, Kong gave birth to her eldest son and second daughter, respectively.

== Art performance ==
=== TV series (TVB) ===
- 2002: Golden Faith
- 2004: Lady Fan
- 2004: To Get Unstuck In Time
- 2005: Scavengers' Paradise
- 2005: Placebo Cure
- 2006: Love Guaranteed

=== Film ===
- 2003: Truth or Dare: 6th Floor Rear Flat

=== Program host ===
- 2001: K-100
- 2001: Tung Wah Charity Gala
- 2004: Pleasure & Leisure
