= Scavengers' Paradise =

- Scavengers' Paradise poster
- 同撈同煲
- Genre: Musical drama
- Starring: Roger Kwok; Myolie Wu; Kenneth Ma; Cherie Kong; Wayne Lai
- Opening theme: "沙煲兄弟闖情關" by Roger Kwok, Kenneth Ma, Myolie Wu, & Cherie Kong
- Country of origin: Hong Kong
- Original language: Cantonese
- No. of episodes: 20

Production
- Producer: Kwan Wing Chung
- Running time: 45 minutes (approx.)

Original release
- Network: TVB
- Release: April 11 – May 6, 2005

Scavengers' Paradise (Chinese: 同撈同煲) is a TVB period drama series broadcast in April 2005.

== Synopsis ==
Tang Wai-Cheung (Roger Kwok) leaves mainland China to 1960s Hong Kong to look for his long lost relative Tang Geng-Jue (Kenneth Ma). Tang Wai-Cheung falls in love with Cheng Bik-Wan (Myolie Wu). They all live together in a poor HK housing project. Eventually, they all get rich from a family inheritance. The story has elements of comedy and musical.

== Cast ==
| Cast | Role | Description |
|---|---|---|
| Roger Kwok | Tang Wai-Cheung 鄧偉祥 | Tang Geng-Jue's nephew. Cheng Bik-Wan's boyfriend. Tang Geng-Chang's cousin. |
| Myolie Wu | Cheng Bik-Wan 鄭碧雲 | Tang Wai-Cheung's girlfriend. |
| Kenneth Ma | Tang Geng-Chan 鄧鏡麈 | Tang Wai-Cheung's uncle. Ling Fung's boyfriend. |
| Cherie Kong (江芷妮) | Ling Fung 凌鳳 | Tang Wai-Cheung's ex-fiancée. Tang Geng Jue's girlfriend. |
| Wayne Lai | Tse Gwan-Min 謝君綿 | Dik Lai-Na 's boyfriend. |
| Iris Wong | Dik Lai-na 狄丽娜 | Tse Gwan-Min's girlfriend |
| Mimi Chu (朱咪咪) | Lo Sam-Koo 盧三姑 | Landlady |
| Chun Wong (秦煌) | Ling Shing-Por 凌醒波 | Ling Fung's father. Lam Lan-Hing's husband. |
| Angelina Lo (盧宛茵) | Lam Lan-Hing 林蘭卿 | Ling Fung's mother. Ling Shing-Por's wife. |
| Mary Hon (韓馬利) | Tang Chiu-Chi 鄧昭慈 | Tang Wai-Cheung's aunt. |
| Lee Shing-Cheung | Luk Gung 陸恭 | |
