= When a Dog Loves a Cat =

- Poster
- 當狗愛上貓
- Genre: Modern Drama
- Starring: Gallen Lo; Myolie Wu; David Lui; Margie Tsang; Raymond Wong; Bernice Liu
- Opening theme: "當狗愛上貓" by Gallen Lo & Myolie Wu
- Country of origin: Hong Kong
- Original language: Cantonese
- No. of episodes: 20

Production
- Producer: Kwan Wing Chung
- Running time: 45 minutes (approx.)

Original release
- Network: TVB
- Release: July 21 – August 15, 2008

When a Dog Loves a Cat (Traditional Chinese: 當狗愛上貓) is a TVB modern drama series broadcast in July 2008.

== Synopsis ==
Promise you love me, honor and keep me,
For better or worse, in sickness and in health.

Miu Chun (Gallen Lo) was once diagnosed with cancer, and became really depressed. Cheung Ka-Ka (Tracy Ip), a nurse, comforted him and later became his girlfriend. Soon after he recovered, the two adopted a cat, Can Can, and a dog, 大巴 (Dai Ba). One day 大巴 ran across a road, Ka-Ka tried to rescue the dog from an oncoming car but died in the accident herself. From that day on Chun hated dogs and abandoned Dai Ba.

Chow Chi-Yu (Myolie Wu) found 大巴 wandering on the streets and brought him back to her father's kennel. However, 大巴 carried a deadly virus and killed all the dogs at the kennel. Since then, Yu's father became employed with the pound to catch abandoned dogs. Her brother, Chow Chi-Jim (David Lui), and sister-in-law, Shui Tin-Lan (Margie Tsang) opened a pet shop to earn money for the family.

Yu starts her first day of work at Raptor Advertising Company alongside her boyfriend, Carson Ying Hoi-Leung (Raymond Wong) and Chun. Later, Yu finds Siu Ba(小巴), Dai Ba's brother, on the street, and brings him back to the company and promotes him as their advertising icon. Chun was forced to take Siu Ba home and discovers that dogs are not as bad as he thought.

Carson is caught cheating with another woman, and soon Yu and Chun develop a relationship. Kit Man Chi-Kei (Bernice Liu), the boss' daughter, returns from the United States and is given full responsibility of Raptor. Kit is always finding ways to disturb and annoy Chun. He discovers that she secretly has a crush on him. Chun needs to make the decision of which women to be with but is faced with the tragic news of his cancer reappearing.

Chun soon gets used to Siu Ba and starts having a love for dogs. When he first met Siu Ba he was very cruel and rude to him, but he grew on the love when Siu Ba got more attached to Chun. He then let Siu Ba live with him, which made Chow Chow happy.

== Cast ==
Cast	Role	Description
Gallen Lo	Miu Chun (MC) 苗隼	Raptor Advertising Company Media Director/Accounts Clerk
Myolie Wu	Chow Chi-Yu (Chow Chow) 周自瑜	Raptor Advertising Company Accounts Manager; Chow Chi Jim's younger sister. Ying Hoi-Leung's girlfriend.
Margie Tsang (曾華倩)	Shui Tin-Lan (Tina) 水天蘭	Jim Jim Pet Megastore Owner; Chow Chi-Jim's wife.
David Lui (呂方)	Chow Chi-Jim 周自沾	Dog Trainer; Chow Ji-Yu's older brother. Shui Tin-Lan's husband.
Bernice Liu	Man Chi-Kei (Kit) 文梓淇	Raptor Advertising Company Accounts Director; Miu Jun and Chow Ji-Yu's boss.
Raymond Wong	Ying Hoi-Leung (Carson) 應海亮	Raptor Advertising Company Creative Director; Chow Chi-Yu's boyfriend.
Benz Hui	Miu Dai-Mo 苗大武	Miu Chun's father. Wong Mei-Wah's ex-husband.
Manna Chan	Wong Mei-Wah 王美華	Miu Chun's mother. Miu Dai-Mo's ex-wife.
Kwok Fung (郭峰)	Chow Bat-Kau 周不苟	Chow Ji-Yu and Chow Ji-Jim's father.
Patrick Dunn	Man Chi-Dat (Ah Man) 文智達	Raptor Advertising Company Owner; Man Sze-Kei's stepfather.
Wilson Tsui (艾威)	Lam Joh-Ji 林佐治	Raptor Advertising Company Accounts Assistant; Miu Chun's best friend.
Sharon Luk	Lam Yeuk-Si 藍若施	Veterinarian
Tracy Ip	Cheung Ka-Ka 張嘉嘉	Miu Chun's deceased girlfriend.
Angelina Lo		Shui Tin Lan’s mother

== Viewership ratings ==
Week		Episode	Average Points	Peaking Points	References
1	July 21–25, 2008	1 — 5	29	33	
2	July 28 - August 1, 2008	6 — 10	29	33	
3	August 4–7, 2008	11 — 14	31	—	
4	August 11–14, 2008	15 — 18	30	—	
4	August 15, 2008	19 — 20	32	33	

== Awards and nominations ==
41st TVB Anniversary Awards (2008)

- "Best Drama"
