= Myolie Wu =

Hong Kong actress and singer

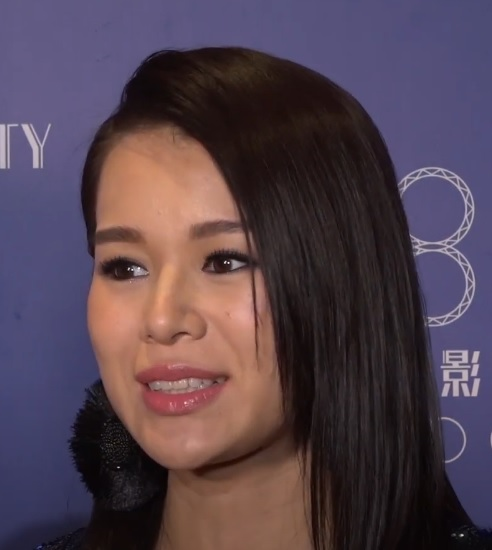
- Wu in January 2019
- Born: British Hong Kong
- Occupations: Actress; singer; merchant
- Years active: 1999–present
- Spouse: Philip Lee (m. 2015)
- Children: 3
- Awards: Miss Hong Kong 1999 2nd Runner-up TVB Anniversary Awards – Most Improved Female Artiste; 2002 Golden Faith; My Favourite Female Character; 2011 Ghetto Justice; Best Actress; 2011 Curse of the Royal Harem
- Musical career
- Origin: Hong Kong
- Genre: Cantopop
- Instrument: Vocals
- Labels: TVB; Neway Star

Chinese name
- Traditional Chinese: 胡杏兒
- Simplified Chinese: 胡杏儿
Transcriptions
Standard Mandarin
- Hanyu Pinyin: Hú Xìng'ér
Yue: Cantonese
- Jyutping: Wu4 Hang6 Ji4

Myolie Wu Hang-yee is a Hong Kong actress and singer. She is previously managed by Hong Kong TVB television station and Neway Star. In 2011, she won Best Actress for her role in Curse of the Royal Harem, Most Favourite TV Female Character for her role in Ghetto Justice and also "Extraordinary Elegant Actress" at the TVB Anniversary Awards 2011, making her the first ever Triple TV Queen of the year.

== Early years ==
In her schooling days, Myolie Wu received high school education in Boarding School at Methodist College Belfast, Northern Ireland. She later returned to Hong Kong and attended the Hong Kong University of Science and Technology, majoring in Biochemistry.

During her first year in university, Wu took part the Miss Hong Kong pageant in 1999 and clinched second runner-up. Shortly afterward, she signed on to TVB as a full-time contracted artiste and withdrew from school.

== Career ==
=== Acting ===
In her early years, Myolie Wu started out as supporting characters in television serials. Her acting began to gain recognition through her breakthrough performance in Golden Faith, in which she portrayed the mentally challenged younger sister of Gallen Lo's character, Ivan Ting. Her role was well received by the audience and she was awarded the Most Improved Female Artiste Award at the 2002 TVB Anniversary Awards.

Wu was offered her first lead role in Survivor's Law in 2003. In the same year, she also starred in the classic TVB drama Triumph in the Skies alongside veteran actors Francis Ng and Flora Chan. Both series received high viewership ratings and she soon rose to popularity.

In 2005, TVB aired five drama serials in which Wu was lead actress. She received further acknowledgement for her acting in the hit series Wars of In-Laws where she played the shrewd daughter in-law of Liza Wang. The same serial was also what sparked her ongoing rumours with co-star Bosco Wong.

In 2007, Wu was paired with Mainland actor Feng Shao Feng in the TVB-CCTV joint production The Drive Of Life. The couple was well received by fans. She also starred as Chow Lai-Man in the second installment of War of In-Laws, Wars of In-Laws II in the same year.

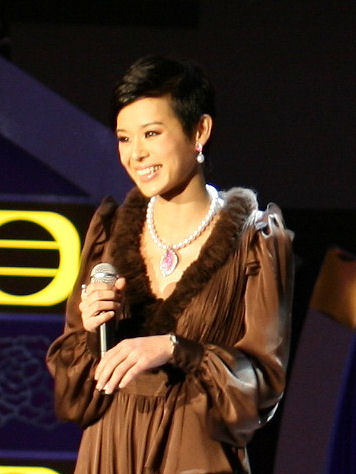
Wu in 2007

Wu took another step in her acting career in 2009 by filming her first Mainland drama Beauty's Rival in Palace, in which she guest-starred in for five episodes and was once again paired with Feng Shao Feng. The drama achieved a high viewership rating and her performance was well-praised. She continued to film her second Mainland series Happy Mother-in-Law, Pretty Daughter-in-Law as lead actress the same year and gained widespread popularity in mainland China.

She also filmed her third Mainland drama Racecourse alongside boyfriend Bosco Wong in late 2010. The series was their third collaboration portraying a couple.

In 2011, Wu starred in TVB dramas The Rippling Blossom, Ghetto Justice, and Curse of the Royal Harem and all three series were listed as Top 5 in viewership ratings of the year. She was crowned "TV Queen" at the 2011 TVB Anniversary Awards after being awarded Best Actress in a Leading Role for her role in Curse of the Royal Harem and My Favorite Female Character for her role in Ghetto Justice. She was also voted by the audience as the Most Extraordinary Elegant Actress (Bosco Wong won the male equivalent) during the awards, making her the first ever TVB actress to win 3 awards at the same award ceremony.

In 2015, Wu decided not to renew her contract with TVB, and signed with GME China. With the support of her fellow actresses, Wu opened a bridal studio business as part of her venture into business.

=== Music ===
Myolie Wu took the first step in her singing career through singing the theme song for her television series War and Destiny in 2007.

She then signed on to the music label Neway Star in 2008 and released her first EP entitled Evolve. In 2009, she released her second EP Loveholic and held her first solo mini-concert. The concert version Liveholic of her EP Loveholic was then released in early 2010.

She continued to sing theme songs for TVB's television series.

== Personal life ==
Myolie Wu is best friends with Nancy Wu, Paisley Wu, Elaine Yiu, Selena Lee and Mandy Wong. They formed the friendship group “胡說八道會” after the Chinese idiom 胡說八道 meaning "nonsense talk", in addition to several members sharing the same last name Wu "胡". In 2017, the group filmed a travel show together.

After ending her 8-year relationship with Bosco Wong, Wu began dating British born Philip Lee in 2014. They got married in December 2015. It was announced on 14 May 2017 via Instagram that she was expecting her first child with her husband. On 13 October 2017, Wu gave birth to the couple's first son, Brendan, which she announced via Instagram. On 21 June 2019, she gave birth to their second son, Ryan. In 2020, she announced she is pregnant with their third child. On 4 April 2021, she gave birth to their third son, Liam.

== Filmography ==
=== Film ===
Year	Title	Role	Notes
2001	Scaremonger		
2010	72 Tenants of Prosperity	Myolie Wu	Cameo
2011	The Founding of a Party	Yuan Shikai's concubine	Cameo
2011	Life Without Principle	Connie	
2014	Temporary Family	Cheung Yee	
2017	Little Lucky	Xie Yuer	
2019	Dearest Anita	Amy	
2019	One Car Four Servants	Mary Sue	
2022	Death Notice	Meng Yun	
TBA	Ordinary Father	Cheng Xin'er	
TBA	To Be Faced		

=== Television series ===
Year	Title	Role	TVB Anniversary Awards
2001	Colourful Life	Ching Wing-chi	
2001	The Awakening Story	Sheung Ping-ping	
2001	At Point Blank	Samantha Ching Hiu-kwan	
2002	Legal Entanglement	To Bi-bi	
2002	Eternal Happiness	Lau Yin-yuk	
2002	Golden Faith	Elaine Ting Sin-yan	TVB Anniversary Award for Most Improved Female Artiste
2002	Family Man	Ko Chui-yi	
2003	Virtues of Harmony II	Mandy Yuen Ying	Episodes 22–25
2003	Survivor's Law	Chung Ching-ling (Ling Ling)	
2003	Triumph in the Skies	Zoe So Yi	
2004	Dream of Colours	Michelle Koo Lok-man	
2005	Lost in the Chamber of Love	Hung Leung	
2005	Scavengers' Paradise	Cheng Pik-wan	
2005	The Gateau Affairs	Tong Sheung	
2005	Wars of In-Laws	Tin Lik (Eleven)	
2005–6	When Rules Turn Loose	Shum Yat-yin (Yan)	
2006	Net Deception	Nancy Kong Kin-yee	
2006	To Grow With Love	Tina Ho Mei-tin	
2007	Doomed to Oblivion	Hiu Ng-mui	
2007	War and Destiny	Koo Ping-on	
2007	The Drive of Life	Yuki Fong Bing-yi	
2008	Wars of In-Laws II	Chow Lai-man	
2008	The Master of Tai Chi	Yin Chi-kwai	
2008	When a Dog Loves a Cat	Chow Chi-yu (Chow Chow)	
2009	Burning Flame III	Ko Wai-ying	
2009–10	A Chip Off the Old Block	So Fung-nei	
2010	In the Eye of the Beholder	Chau-heung	
2010	Beauty's Rival in Palace	Lu Yu	
2010	Happy Mother-in-Law, Pretty Daughter-in-Law	Qian Manguan	
2011	The Rippling Blossom	Keung Keung	
2011	Ghetto Justice	Kris Wong Sze-fu	TVB Anniversary Award for My Favourite Female Character
2011	Curse of the Royal Harem	Empress Consort Hao-sun	TVB Anniversary Award for Best Actress
2012	Wish and Switch	Fan Suk-heung	
2012	Racecourse	Lu Bihui	
2012	House of Harmony and Vengeance	Lei Tsoi-shan (Purple Princess)	
2012	Ghetto Justice II	Kris Wong Sze-fu	
2013	Season of Love	Yiu Tung-nei	
2013	La Ma Qiao Ba	Gu Dandan	
2013	Triumph in the Skies II	Zoe So Yi / Summer Koo Ha-san	
2013	A Splendid Family	Zhang Hanyan (Liu Yuping)	
2014	Wine Beauty	Chen Yiman	
2014	Lady Sour	Cho Ching	
2015	Every Step You Take	Phoebe Sung Tin Chung	
2015	Lord of Shanghai	Gu Xiaolou	
2016	No Reserve	Cheung Kei-sang	
2016	The Adoption/The Adopt (领养)	Xue Mei	
2017	Nothing Gold Can Stay	Wu Yongmei	
2018	Hong Kong West Side Stories	Yang Yuya	
2022	Stories of Lion Rock Spirit	Liang Huan	
2022	Beloved Life	Huang Yunling	
2023	For the First Time in My Life	Dai Sijin	
2024	The Last Cook	Concubine Rong Hui	
2025	A Better Life	Qiu Lisu	

=== Variety and reality show ===
- 2002 – The Weakest Link (一筆OUT消), hosted by Carol Cheng
- 2002 – Russian Roulette (一觸即發), hosted by Dayo Wong
- 2002 – Super Trio Series (吾係獎門人) Season 6 A Trio Delights, hosted by Eric Tsang, Jerry Lamb, Chin Ka Lok
- 2004 – Super Trio Series (繼續無敵獎門人) Season 7 The Super Trio Continues, hosted by Eric Tsang, Jerry Lamb, Chin Ka Lok
- 2006 – Beautiful Cooking (美女廚房), hosted by Ronald Cheng, Alex Fong, Edmond Leung
- 2006 – King of Games (遊戲天王), hosted by Jerry Lamb, Sam Lee, Nancy Lan Sai, Rocky Cheng, Lanmui Lee
- 2007 – Challenge of the Stars (奧運玩得叻), hosted by Natalis Chan
- 2007 – Is that Right (問題娛樂圈), hosted by Elvina Kong and Jack Wu
- 2007 – Deal or No Deal (Hong Kong) (一擲千金), hosted by Alfred Cheung (Myolie won most money with deal, Charmaine Sheh won most money with no deal)
- 2008 – Strictly Come Dancing (舞動奇跡) Season II
- 2009 – Are You Smarter Than a 5th Grader? (係咪小兒科) hosted by Leo Ku
- 2009 – Star Awards (红星大奖2009)-Guest/Award Presenter
- 2009 – Beautiful Cooking II (美女廚房), hosted by Ronald Cheng, Alex Fong, Edmond Leung
- 2009 – Mini Fama Mega Fun (農夫小儀嬉), hosted by Fama, Kitty Yuen
- 2015 – Wonderful Friends (奇妙的朋友)
- 2016 – Star Awards 2016 (红星大奖2016) (Show 2)-Guest/Award Presenter
- 2016 – Star Awards 2016 (红星大奖2016)(Post Party) – Guest/Award Presenter
- 2017 - The Sisterhood Traveling Gang
- 2020 – Every Body Stand By (zh:演員請就位)Season II

=== Music video appearances ===
- "Romantic Century" (浪漫世紀) by Myolie Wu
- "Solo Travel" (單身旅行) by Myolie Wu
- "Fortunately" (幸而) by Myolie Wu
- "The Most Beautiful Seventh Day" (最美麗的第七天) by Kevin Cheng
- "The Most Difficult Day" (最難過今天) by Vincent Wong & Myolie Wu
- "Chocolate and Vanilla" (朱古力與雲呢拿) by Myolie Wu & Bernice Liu
- "Because of Love"' by the cast of Strictly Come Dancing
- "下意識" by Nick Cheung
- "樱花" by Hacken Lee
- "You" by Edison Chen
- "Next Step Special" by Juno Mak

== Discography ==
=== Singles ===
- "Love Delusion" 戀愛妄想 by Myolie Wu (Neway Star)
- "Bright Day" 光明日 by Myolie Wu (Neway Star)
- "Sympathy Points" 同情分 by Myolie Wu (Neway Star)
- "Soul Mate" 靈魂伴侶 by Myolie Wu (Neway Star)
- "A Clean Break" 一刀了斷 by Julian Cheung & Myolie Wu (Neway Star)
- "Loved Once" 愛過 by Julian Cheung & Myolie Wu (Neway Star)
- "Seeking Love" 尋愛 by Myolie Wu (Neway Star)
- "Romantic Century" 浪漫世紀 by Myolie Wu (Neway Star)
- "Solo Travel" 單身旅行 by Myolie Wu (Neway Star)
- "Time Doesn't Wait For Me" 時間不等我 by Myolie Wu (Neway Star)

=== Soundtrack appearances ===
- (戀愛星空4+4) Theme Song – "1 plus 1" (一加一) by Myolie Wu (Metro Radio Drama 新城廣播有限公司) (2005)
- Lost in the Chamber of Love (西廂奇緣) Theme Song – "Married Clothes" 嫁衣裳 by Ron Ng & Myolie Wu (2005)
- Scavengers' Paradise (同撈同煲) Theme Song Satay brothers by Roger Kwok, Kenneth Ma, Cherie Kong & Myolie Wu (2005)
- Wars of In-Laws (我的野蠻奶奶) Theme Song – "House Rules" 家規 by Liza Wang, Bosco Wong & Myolie Wu (2005)
- To Grow With Love (肥田囍事) Sub-Theme Song – "Miss Pig" 豬小姐 by Myolie Wu (2006)
- To Grow With Love (肥田囍事) Theme Song – "Beautiful Unattractiveness" 醜得漂亮 by Andy Hui & Myolie Wu (album: In the Name of by Andy Hui) (2006)
- War and Destiny (亂世佳人) Theme Song – "Fortunately" 幸而 by Myolie Wu (album: Lady in Red Various Artists) (2006)
- (魔界女王候補生) Theme Song – "Chocolate and Vanilla" 朱古力與雲呢拿 by Bernice Liu & Myolie Wu (album: EEG TVB Kids Songs Selection) (2007)
- When A Dog Loves A Cat (當狗愛上貓) Theme Song – When a Dog Loves a Cat by Gallen Lo & Myolie Wu (2008)
- Wars of In-Laws II (野蠻奶奶大戰戈師奶) Sub-Theme Song – "The Most Difficult Day" 最難過今天 by Vincent Wong & Myolie Wu (2008)
- Wars of In-Laws II (野蠻奶奶大戰戈師奶) Sub-Theme Song – "Grateful for Meeting You" 感激遇到你 by Bosco Wong & Myolie Wu (2008)
- Burning Flame III (烈火雄心III) Sub-Theme Song – "Intention" 有意 by Kevin Cheng & Myolie Wu (2009)
- A Chip Off the Old Block (巴不得爸爸) Theme Song – Mike talks about you by Ron Ng & Myolie Wu (2009)
- Curse of the Royal Harem (zh:萬凰之王) Sub-Theme Song – "Made in heaven" 天造地設 by Myolie Wu (2011)
- Lady Sour (zh:醋娘子)Theme Song – "When You Came into My Life?"是你嗎? by Ron Ng & Myolie Wu (2014)
- Every Step You Take (zh:陪著你走) Theme Song – "Angel" 天使 by Myolie Wu (2015)

=== Albums ===
- Myolie Wu : Evolve (November 2008)
- Myolie Wu : Loveholic (November 2009)

== Awards ==
=== 2020 ===
- Tencent Video Every Body Stand By (zh:演員請就位) Season 2 – Best Actor
- 2020 17th Esquire awards ceremony – Annual Quality Artists
- 2020 Southern People Weekly – Charismatic Person of the Year Top 12

=== 2017 & 2018 ===
- 2018 TV Drama Quality Ceremony – Annual impact drama stars (Nothing Gold Can Stay)
- 2017 Sina Weibo Star Awards Ceremony – Weibo Popularity Star II (Brendan Lee) (Held 2018)

=== 2015 & 2016 ===
- 2016 12th Chinese American Film Festival – Best Actress In A Leading Role of Chinese TV Series (My Step Father Is A Hero)
- 2016 BJTV Crossover Singer (zh:跨界歌王 (第一季))Season 1 – Rank no. 13th
- 2015–2016 onlylady beauty queen award ceremony – The most popular beauty queen of the year (Held 2016)
- Oriental Press Group Internet users choose East 2015 – Public Opinion TV Queen Rank no. 10th

=== 2013 & 2014 ===
- 2014 Jessica Code Magazine Edgy Icon Award
- 2014 "Fashion Chi" "Love is the Most Beautiful Fashion" Star Ceremony – Star Fashion Idol
- 2014 China Urban Fashion Festival – The Most Valuable Female Film and Television Artist of the Year
- 2013 Forbes China Celebrity 100 Comprehensive Ranking: 82nd, Revenue Ranking: 83rd
- 2013 TVB Star Awards Malaysia – My Favourite TVB Drama Characters Top 15
- 2013 StarHub TVB Awards – My Favourite TVB Female TV Character
- 2013 Young Choice Awards – The Most Popular Actress in Hong Kong and Taiwan
- 2013 Next Magazine TV Artists Awards: 5th

=== 2012 ===
- 2012 Forbes China Celebrity 100 Comprehensive Ranking: 69th, Revenue Ranking: 78th
- Top 10 character with impressive style in the world's greatest catwalk 2012 in Hong Kong
- 2012 TVB Top 10 On Screen Couple Election – My favorite extreme screen couple with Bosco Wong
- 2012 Astro On Demand Top 15 Favourite TV Character Award
- 2012 StarHub TVB Awards – My Favourite TVB Actress
- 2012 StarHub TVB Awards – My Favourite TVB Female TV Character
- 2012 Asian Idol Awards Ceremony – Best Drama Actress in Hong Kong and Taiwan
- 2012 7th Huading Awards – China Best Drama Actress
- 2012 Next Magazine TV Artists Awards: 3rd
- 2012 Next Magazine MOISELLE Elegant Fashion Female Artist Award
- 2012 2nd LETV Entertainment Awards in HK's Best TV Actress
- 2012 3rd Prince Jewelry & Watch Elite Award – TV Elite

=== 2011 ===
- 2011 Yahoo! Asia Buzz Awards – Popular Female Artist Award
- 2011 TVB Anniversary Best Actress Award in a Female Leading Role – Curse of the Royal Harem
- 2011 TVB Anniversary My Favourite Female Character Award – Ghetto Justice
- 2011 TVB Anniversary Extraordinary Elegant Female Artists Award
- 2011 Astro On Demand Top 15 Favourite TV Character Award – Curse of the Royal Harem
- 2011 Astro On Demand My Favourite Leading Actress Award – Curse of the Royal Harem
- 2011 StarHub TVB Awards My Favourite Character – The Rippling Blossom
- 2011 StarHub TVB Awards The Partners with Most Sparks Award: Chilam Cheung, Myolie Wu

=== 2009 & 2010 ===
- 2009 Century Sakura Customer Awards Ceremony – Fashion Glamor Female Artist
- 2009 Music Pioneer Award – Most Outstanding Movies & Television Singer
- 2009 Music Pioneer List Award – Most Popular Duet Gold Song with Chilam/ Myolie Wu "Once Loved"
- 2009 Jade Solid Gold Most Popular Duet (Silver)
- 2009 Metro Radio – Most Popular Duet with Chilam
- 2009 9th Chinese Music Media Award – New Most Powerful Singer Award 2009
- 2009 IFPI Female Newcomer
- 2009 Neway Music Awards
- 2009 Next Magazine TV Artists Awards: 10th
- 2009 Astro Wah Lai Toi Drama Awards: Favourite Bizarre Character – Ho Mei Tin in To Grow With Love
- 2009 Astro Wah Lai Toi Drama Awards: Favourite Character – Ho Mei Tin in To Grow With Love

=== 2008 ===
- 2008 IFPI Awards: Best Selling Local Female Newcomer
- 2008 RTHK Top 10 Gold Song Awards: Newcomer Merit Award
- 2008 Sina Music Awards Most Favorite Female Newcomer Award (Silver)
- 2008 Jade Solid Gold Most Popular Duet (Bronze)
- 2008 Jade Solid Gold Recommended Newcomer Outstanding Award
- 2008 Chik Chak 903 Music Award Female Newcomer (Silver)
- 2008 Metro Hits Award Female Newcomer (新城勁爆新登場女歌手)
- 2008 9+2音樂先鋒榜2008 Female Newcomer Award
- 2008 9+2音樂先鋒榜2008 Best Actor-Singer Award
- 2008 TVB 41st Anniversary: Most Fashionable Artiste Award
- 2008 China Fashion Carnival – Most Fashionable Artiste (2008)
- 2008 Outstanding Charitable Artiste Award
- 2008 Quality Life Award
- 2008 Jessica Code Magazine Most Stylish Cover Award
- 2008 3D-Gold Charismatic Actress Award
- 2008 Next Magazine TV Artists Awards: 4th
- 2008 Astro Wah Lai Toi Drama Awards: Favourite character award – Ping On from War and Destiny

=== 2007 ===
- 2007 Yahoo Buzz! Award: Most Searched Upcoming Rising Artist
- 2007 Asian Television Awards: Best Comedy Performance by an Actress
- 2007 TVB Children's Songs Award: Top 10 (with Bernice Liu)
- 2007 Next Magazine TV Artists Awards: 3rd

=== 2006 ===
- 2006 Metro Showbiz Television Awards: Top 12 Popular TV Series Actor/Actress Award
- 2006 TVB Popularity Awards: Most Popular On-Screen Couple – Bosco Wong and Myolie Wu
- 2006 TVB Popularity Awards: Top 10 Favourite Characters – Myolie Wu for Tin Lik in WOIL
- 2006 Next Magazine TV Artists Awards: 7th
- 2006 Annual Artist Award: Music Newcomer – Silver
- 2006 Annual Artist Award: TV Actress Award – Bronze

=== 2005 ===
- 2005 Astro Wah Lai Toi Drama Awards: Favorite character from "Dream of Colours"
- 2005 Golden TVS Awards from South China: Most Popular Cantonese Speaking Actress
- 2005 Yahoo Buzz! Award: Yahoo most searched TV Actress Award
- 2005 TVB Weekly: Most Popular Female Idol Award
- 2005 Next TV Magazine: Ferti "Style & Chic" Award
- 2005 Smiling Together & Lifting our Spirits Function: Brightest Smile Award
- Astro Wah Lai Toi Drama Awards: My Favourite Leading Actress Award – Tin Lik in War of In-Laws
- Astro Wah Lai Toi Drama Awards: Favourite character from War of In-Laws
- 2004 Entertainment Weekly: Future Galore Star

=== 2003 ===
- 2003 3rd Weekly: Popular Actress Award
- 2003 Next TV Magazine: Best "Personal Style" Smile

=== 2002 ===
- 2002 TVB 35th Anniversary: Most Improved Actress Award

=== 1999 ===
- 1999 Miss Hong Kong: 2nd runner up & "Most Energetic" Award
