= Tracy Ip =

Hong Kong actress and model

- Born: 10 September 1981 (age 45); Hong Kong
- Spouse: Raymond Chow (m. 2015)
- Children: 3

Chinese name
- Traditional Chinese: 葉翠翠
- Simplified Chinese: 叶翠翠
Transcriptions
Standard Mandarin
- Hanyu Pinyin: Yè Cuìcuì
Yue: Cantonese
- Jyutping: Jip^{6} Ceoi^{3} Ceoi^{3}

Tracy Ip Chui Chui is a Hongkonger actress, model and beauty pageant titleholder. She won the Miss Hong Kong Pageant in 2005.

== Background ==
Tracy Ip was born on 10 September 1981 in Hong Kong with family roots in Shanghai. Coming from a family of four, Ip lives with her parents. Her mother wanted to compete at Miss Hong Kong but gave up when she married. Her father worked as a fireman. Ip grew up in Hong Kong and studied at King Edward's School, Witley in England for a few years. In the early 2000s, she returned to Hong Kong and entered the Hong Kong Polytechnic University, majoring in fashion design. She was also a part-time model with Elite, modelling in some shows and commercials. She entered the Elite Look of the Year (HK) 2001 contest, making the top 24 but failed to win. In 2005 she competed in the 2005 Miss Hong Kong competition.

== Miss Hong Kong 2005 ==
Ip was trained with 19 other delegates for three months. She visited the Tsunami affected areas like Sri Lanka during her training. After that, on 20 August 2005, she competed at the HK Colliseum for the Miss Hong Kong 2005 crown. Despite negative rumours that she had plastic surgery done on her nose, she won the crown. She also received the title of Miss Charity. Following her win, she hosted a number of shows and performed in many charity shows in Hong Kong.

== Miss World 2005 ==
Ip competed in Sanya, China for the Miss World 2005 title. She started out well for having some common "features" of former Miss World semi-finalists from Hong Kong (like Maggie Cheung of 1983 and Pauline Yeung of 1987, all had lived/studied in England). She placed seventh in the Asia Pacific team and was close to winning the fast track event, Beauty with a Purpose. Ip also made the top 19 of the Beach Beauty Contest, which stunned many pageant fans. Ip also sold 35,000 RMB for her globe that was donated and auctioned at a charity dinner. It was the item that raised the most money that night. She returned to Hong Kong on 10 December.

== Miss Chinese International 2006 ==
On 28 December 2005, Ip attended a press conference for the Miss Chinese International 2006 pageant. Being a favourite from the start, Ip was expected to place in the top 3, and might even take the crown. Surprisingly, Ip was shut out of the top 5 of the pageant. She only received a side award as a consolation. She is only one a few Miss Hong Kong winners to not make the top 5 in the history of the pageant.

== Career ==
After winning Miss Hong Kong, Ip afterwards hosted TVB shows like EBuzz. She also signed a contract with TVB to start in some dramas. On 12 August 2006, she gave her crown and duties to Aimee Chan Yan Mei, Miss Hong Kong 2006. She also presented an award to Mr. Hong Kong 2006, Francois Huynh (Wong Cheung Fat) as he was the Handsome Group winner.

Ip has appeared in a number of television shows. She left TVB in 2017, and has since been active on the social media where she has a significant following.

== Personal life ==
Tracy Ip married architect Raymond Chow in 2015. The couple have three children.

== Filmography ==
=== Television ===
Year	Title	Role	Notes
2007	Heart of Greed	Cherry	
2007	Steps	Anita	
2008	Dressage to Win	Mrs. Dai Ma	
2008	Love Exchange	Tung Sze-ting (Sophie)	
2008	When a Dog Loves a Cat	Cheung Ga-ga	Guest star
2008	Moonlight Resonance	Fong Shu-ting	
2009	Beyond the Realm of Conscience	Wong Zi	
2010	When Lanes Merge	Daisy	
2010	Can't Buy Me Love	Princess Ching Wan	
2010–2011	Links to Temptation	Alice	Guest star (ep. 11, 19, 20)
2011–2012	Bottled Passion	Fu Bak-wai	
2012	Let It Be Love	Chow Sze-ching	
2012	Daddy Good Deeds	Miss Koo	Guest star (ep. 1)
2012	The Greatness of a Hero	Consort Chun	Guest star (ep. 1); Previously warehoused; aired overseas February 2009
2013	The Day of Days	Ng Mei-fung	
2013	Beauty at War	Giarsin Su-lan	
2013	Bounty Lady	Sing Fa-ngok	
2014	Storm in a Cocoon	Yeung Yin-to	
2015	Every Step You Take	Bianca	
2015	Lord of Shanghai	Ching Siu-dip	
2016	Inspector Gourmet	Tong Ko Man	Ep.17–20

=== Film ===
Year	Title	Role	Notes
2009	Turning Point		

Achievements
Preceded by Kate Tsui	Miss Hong Kong; 2005	Succeeded by Aimee Chan
