= Bottled Passion =

Hong Kong television series

- Official poster
- Also known as: My Lying Lover; My Cruel Lover
- 我的如意狼君
- Genre: Period drama
- Written by: Chan Ching-yee
- Starring: Niki Chow; Raymond Wong Ho-yin; Elaine Yiu; Katy Kung; Raymond Cho; Claire Yiu; Rebecca Chan; Kwok Fung; Joel Chan; Jack Wu
- Theme music composer: Tang Chi-wai
- Opening theme: "Chiu Fa Chik Sap" (朝花夕拾) by Teresa Cheung
- Country of origin: Hong Kong
- Original language: Cantonese
- No. of episodes: 21

Production
- Executive producer: Lee Tim-shing
- Production location: Hong Kong
- Camera setup: Multi-camera
- Running time: 45 minutes
- Production company: Television Broadcasts Limited

Original release
- Network: Jade; HD Jade
- Release: 6 December 2011 – 2 January 2012

Related
- Curse of the Royal Harem; Wish and Switch

Bottled Passion
- intertitle
- Chinese: 我的如意狼君
- Literal meaning: "my ideal 'cruel' husband"
Transcriptions
Yue: Cantonese
- Yale Romanization: ngo5 dik1 yu4 yi3 long4 gwan1
- Jyutping: ngo5 dik1 jyu4 ji3 long4 gwan1

Bottled Passion is a Hong Kong television drama produced by Television Broadcasts Limited (TVB) under executive producer Lee Tim-shing. The drama premiered on Jade and HD Jade channels on 6 December 2011 and ended its run on 2 January 2012 with a total of 21 episodes. The Chinese title literally translates to "My Ideal Cruel Husband" (Chinese: 我的如意狼君; Cantonese Yale: ngo5 dik1 yu4 yi3 long4 gwan1), with a wordplay on the words "long4 gwan1" (郎君), meaning "husband" or "pimp", and "long4" (狼), meaning "cruel" or "cunning".

== Synopsis ==
Tung Kwok Hing (Rebecca Chan) adopted an orphan and claimed he was Ko Yi Ho (Raymond Wong), the illegitimate child that her husband Ko Siu Tong (Samuel Kwok) had been searching for many years. Tong believed Ho was more suitable than his oldest son Ko Yi Tai (Joel Chan) to be his successor, which later led to Mrs. Ko's discontent. Eventually Ho was kicked out of the family, leaving him homeless. Living out alone, Ho got a taste of the bitterness in life and was determined to return home and take revenge on his adopted family under a different name Tung Bun Sin. Under his new identity, he vowed to give them a taste of losing their loved ones. Meanwhile, he runs into the naive, trusting Tsui Sum (Niki Chow), who had just taken over her family business. Seeing an opportunity, Ho deceives Tsui Sum of her family business and all her family's money in order to get closer to the Ko family. However, old ties, secrets, and memories of a childhood sweetheart come back to haunt him. Eventually Ho embarks on a road that threatens the lives of all he holds dear, and the life of the only woman he's ever loved.

== Cast ==
Cast	Role	Description
Raymond Wong Ho-yin	Tung Bun Sin 佟本善	(Lei Ho) Age 29 He and Tsui Sum were orphans together. When Tsui Sum was young, she lost her memory in an accident. She was later adopted by an owner of a sauce manufacturing factory, and became in charge of the factory. When she grew up, she meets him again. In order to exact revenge, he enters the factory. Later, they fall in love, and Tsui Sum regains her memory, only to discover her childhood friend is on the road to evil Stabbed by Yee-kiu in Ep.21 and struggled out to a boat and might've died drifting out to sea, since he was stroking Tsui Sum when she was possibly not dreaming. Even six years later, some viewers still believe Tung Bun Sin lived and will meet Tsui Sum at their meeting place.
Niki Chow	Tsui Sum 徐芯	Age 26; Nickname: Milk Candy (牛奶糖); The adopted daughter of the Tsui family She and Tung Bun Sin will have an amnesic love story

=== The Ko Family ===
Cast	Role	Description
Kwok Fung	Mr. Ko / Ko Siu-tong 高兆堂	Age 55; The Ko family patriarch Tung Kwok-hing's husband Ko Yee-tai, Yuen Yau-hin, Ko Yee-kiu, Ko Yee-nga's father
Rebecca Chan	Tung Kwok-hing 董幗馨	Age 50; Mr. Ko's wife Ko Yee-tai, Ko Yee-kiu and Ko Yee-nga's mother Mr. Ko's wife who adopts Bun-sin and lies to Mr. Ko that he was his long lost son, Yee-ho. When Mr. Ko decides that Bun-sin makes a better heir than her own son Yee-tai, she ruthlessly banishes Bun-sin from the family. Prisoned and died in Ep.20 of heart problem (Main villain)
Joel Chan	Ko Yee-tai 高爾泰	Age 30; He is the Ko family's eldest and only son, who is one step closer to inheriting his family's business after his mother kicked out Bun-sin. Died in Ep.20 after falling off a cliff. (Main villain)
Tracy Ip	Fu Bak-wai 傅百慧	Age 28; Ko Yee-tai's wife
Jack Wu	Yuen Yau Hin 原佑軒	Age 28; A doctor Ko Siu-tong's son Loved Tsui Sum
Elaine Yiu	Ko Yee-kiu 高爾喬	Age 26; Yee-tai's younger sister, who is also one of Bun-sin's love victims. Hui Man Hon's fiancee, later broke up. Stabs Bun-sin in revenge in Ep.21 and commits suicide. Saved but falls in coma.
Katy Kung	Ko Yee-nga 高爾雅	Age 19; The youngest daughter of the Ko family. Like her sister, she is one of Bun-sin's love victims (Villain)

=== The Tsui Family ===
Cast	Role	Description
Ching Hor Wai	Lau Suet Ling 林玉嫻	Age 50; Tsui Ping and Tsui On's mother Tsui Sum's adopted mother
Raymond Cho	Tsui Ping 徐平	Age 30; Lau Suet Ling's son Tsui Sum and Tsui On's older brother
Claire Yiu	Wun You 溫柔	Age 29; Tsui Ping's wife
Niki Chow	Tsui Sum 徐芯	Age 26; Lau Suet Ling's adopted daughter Tsui Ping and Tsui On's sister
Vin Choi	Tsui On 徐安	Lau Suet Ling's son Tsui Sum and Tsui Ping's brother The youngest son of the Tsui family, who is educated. He does not take part in the family's sauce manufacturing factory, as he tries to make money in the stock market, which later causes a crisis for the family.

=== The Hui Family ===
Cast	Role	Description
Lee Sing Cheung	Hui Chun Ting 許晉廷	Director of Canton City Hall; Hui Man Hon's father Tam Mei Yan's husband
Cecilia Fong	Tam Mei Yan 譚美欣	Hui Chun Ting's wife Hui Man Hon's mother
Chan Kin Man	Hui Man Hon 許文翰	Hui Chun Ting and Tam Mei Yan's son Ko Yee Kiu's fiance, later broke up Attempted suicide after broke up in Episode 17

=== Minor characters ===
Cast	Role	Description
Eric Li	Lo Yat 羅一	Age 28; A con artist So Fei's boyfriend, later husband Tung Bun-sin's assistant Emigrated to Hong Kong in Episode 21
Janice Shum	So Fei 蘇菲	Luo Yat's girlfriend, later wife Emigrated to Hong Kong and gave birth to twins in Episode 21; Tung Bun-sin's secretary
Yoyo Chen	Chen Yu Feng 文玉鳳	Ko Yee-tai's mistress, after crash Committed suicide in Episode 1
Raymond Chiu	Pan-Zijian 潘子健	Secret boyfriend of Ko Yee-Kiu Episode 4: Arm broken by Tung Kwok-hing Episode5: Joins Tung Pun-Sin for revenge against the Ko family, rehired by the Ko family
Mok Wai Man	Uncle Shek 石叔	Mr. Tung's housekeeper Assisted Lee Ho to counterfeit Tung Bin-sin

== Viewership ratings ==
Week	Originally Aired	Episodes	Average Points	Peaking Points	References
1	December 6–9, 2011	1 — 4	26	29	
2	December 12–16, 2011	5 — 9	26	31	
3	December 19–23, 2011	10 — 14	27	31	
4	December 26–30, 2011	15 — 19	29	33	
4	January 2, 2012	20 — 21	36	40	

== International Broadcast ==
- Malaysia - 8TV (Malaysia)
