= Raymond Wong Ho-yin =

Hong Kong actor

Raymond Wong
- 黃浩然
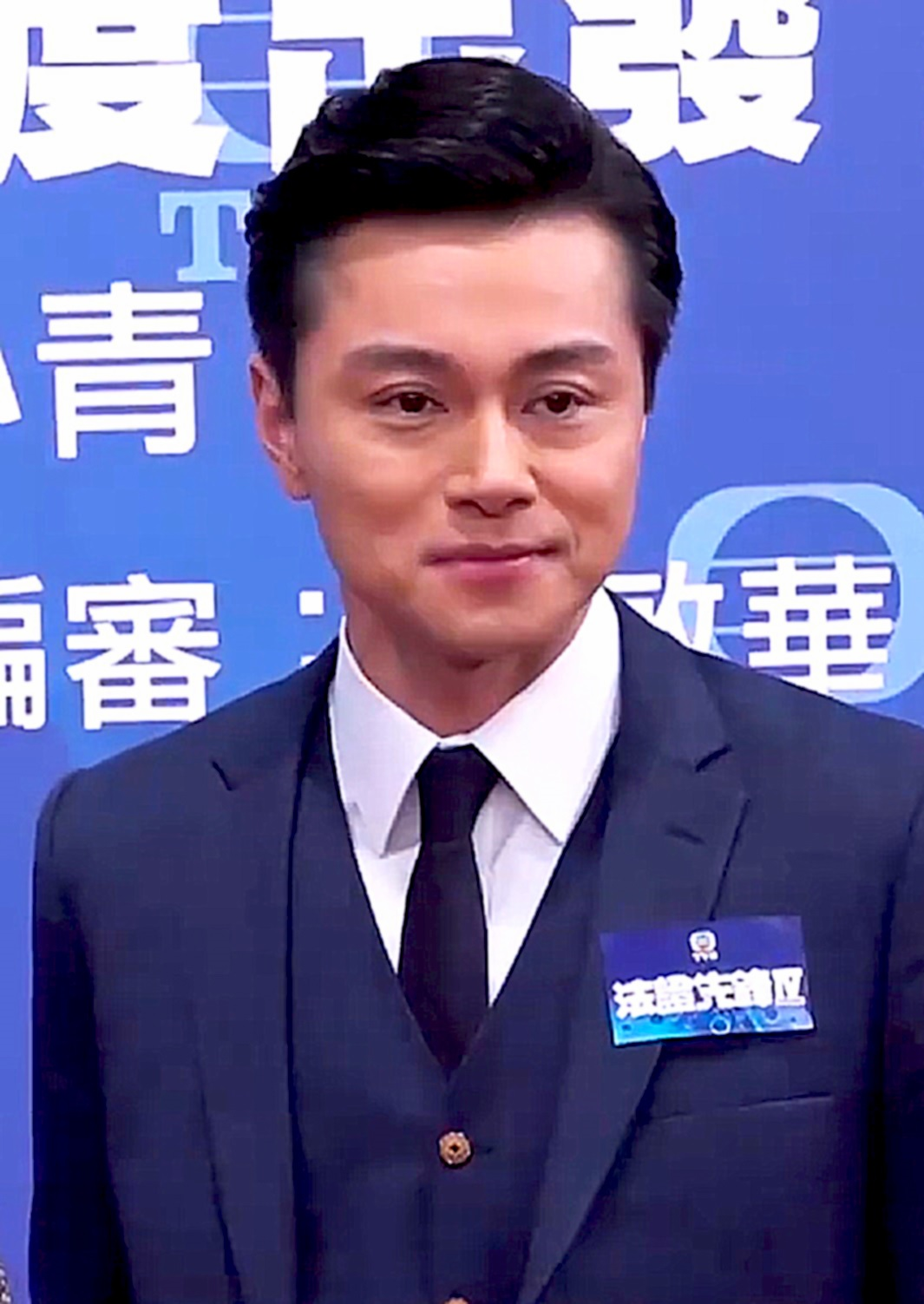
- Wong in 2019
- Born: 25 August 1975 (age 51); British Hong Kong
- Occupation: Actor
- Years active: 1997–present
- Spouse: Kaka Mok (m. 2005)
- Children: 2
- Awards: TVB Anniversary Awards – Most Improved Male Artiste; 2010 A Watchdog's Tale, When Lanes Merge, Can't Buy Me Love, No Regrets My AOD Favourites Awards – My Favourite Supporting Actor; 2011 Twilight Investigation

Chinese name
- Traditional Chinese: 黃浩然
- Simplified Chinese: 黄浩然
Transcriptions
Standard Mandarin
- Hanyu Pinyin: Huáng Hàorán
Yue: Cantonese
- Yale Romanization: Wòhng Houh-yìhn
- Jyutping: Wong4 Hou6-Jin4

Raymond Wong Ho-yin (born 25 August 1975) is a Hong Kong actor.

== Early life ==
Wong completed his secondary education in Hong Kong Tang King Po College and went on to receive a degree from the City University of Hong Kong. He worked as a model after he graduated from his secondary school, and was discovered by director Johnnie To.

=== Film career ===
Afterwards, Wong entered the film business and became a full-time film actor. However, most of his early film roles were minor.

=== ATV period ===
In 2002, Wong transformed himself into a television actor and joined Asia Television. He participated in number of ATV dramas, such as Son from Past and Central Affairs. Since then, he successfully caught Hong Kong audiences' attention.

=== TVB period ===
In 2007, Wong joined Television Broadcasts Limited. He gained his fame in 2009 by portraying Wu Ting-hin in Sweetness in the Salt. He earned nominations in TVB Anniversary Awards in the category for Best Supporting Actor and Most Improved Male Artiste, but lost to Michael Tse and Pierre Ngo respectively. In 2010, he earned his first leading role in When Lanes Merge in portraying a driver who was jailed after being found guilty of dangerous driving. Also, he participated in TVB's anniversary production No Regrets. He portrayed the character Yeung Yeung, who was a childhood friend of Fala Chen's character, Lau Ching, Yeung gives unconditional care love to the ill-fated Ching and later became her husband. He earned three nominations in 2010 TVB Anniversary Awards in the category of Best Supporting Actor, My Favourite Male Character and Most Improved Male Artiste, and he finally won the last one. In 2011, he continue to take part in major leading role in a number of dramas, such as The Truth and Bottled Passion.

In 2021, Wong left the network with his final drama being Forensic Heroes IV and has been signed with Louis Koo's management, Sky High Entertainment since 2019.

== Personal life ==
Wong married Kaka Mok in 2005. The couple have two sons.

In September 2014, Wong was diagnosed with the rare Behçet's disease. In December 2014, he was reported to have recovered, especially with the use of traditional Chinese medicine.

== Filmography ==
=== Television dramas ===
Year	Title	Role	Notes
1999	Ethics Education 99	Mr. To	
2001	Wu Yen	Ng Hei	
2002	As You Wish	Lo Kung	
2003	Light of Million Hopes	Tung Fung-shun	
2003	Son from the Past	Sing Fung	
2005	Central Affairs	Johnny Hon Ji-kin	
2005	A Dream Named Desire II	Leung Fuk-wah	
2005	The Proud Twins	Jiang Feng	
2007	ICAC Investigators 2007	Ethan Leung Dik-wai	Episode 2: The Sand Dune Castle
2007	Marriage of Inconvenience	Ivan Yik Hei-chi	
2008	When a Dog Loves a Cat	Carson Ying Hoi-leung	
2008	When Easterly Showers Fall on the Sunny West	Poon Cheuk-wah	Nominated — TVB Anniversary Award for Most Improved Male Artiste
2009	Sweetness in the Salt	Wu Ting-hin	Nominated — TVB Anniversary Award for Best Supporting Actor; Nominated — TVB Anniversary Award for Most Improved Male Artiste
2009	ICAC Investigators 2009	Investigator Henry Leung Pak-wah	Episode 1: Making Markets; Nominated — TVB Anniversary Award for Most Improved Male Artiste (Top 5)
2009-10	A Watchdog's Tale	Ho Tin-yau	TVB Anniversary Award for Most Improved Male Artiste
2010	The Mysteries of Love	Wong Tze-ho	Guest appearance (Episode 24-25); TVB Anniversary Award for Most Improved Male Artiste
2010	When Lanes Merge	Ho Ka-bo (Turbo)	TVB Anniversary Award for Most Improved Male Artiste; Nominated — TVB Anniversary Award for My Favourite Male Character
2010	Can't Buy Me Love	Kam Dor-sau	TVB Anniversary Award for Most Improved Male Artiste
2010	No Regrets	Yeung Yeung	TVB Anniversary Award for Most Improved Male Artiste; Nominated — TVB Anniversary Award for Best Supporting Actor (Top 5)
2010	Twilight Investigation	Chow Ka-sing	My AOD Favourites Award for My Favourite Actor in a Supporting Role
2011	A Great Way to Care	Lee Ying-chun	
2011	Grace Under Fire	Wong Hon-yip	
2011	Only You	Hung Man-sang	
2011	The Other Truth	Wallace Cheuk Siu-him	Nominated — TVB Anniversary Award for My Favourite Male Character (Top 15)
2011–12	Bottled Passion	Tung Boon-sin / Lee Ho	
2012	Gloves Come Off	But Ka-sing	Nominated - TVB Anniversary Award for Best Actor (Top 10)
2012	The Last Steep Ascent		Guest Star
2012	The Confidant	Yiu Sheung-hei	Nominated - TVB Anniversary Award for My Favourite Male Character (Top 10)
2013	Karma Rider	Chor Yat-chin	
2013	Missing You	young Yim Ho-gong	Guest appearance
2013	Slow Boat Home	Cheung Po-chai	
2013	The Day of Days	So Fei	
2014	Swipe Tap Love	Lok Tin-sung	
2014	ICAC Investigators 2014	Investigator Mak Siu-tin	Episode 2: Web of Greed
2014	All That Is Bitter Is Sweet	Chong Kei-cho / Chong Kei-chung	
2014	Overachievers	Hugo Chung Hiu-yeung	
2015	Every Step You Take	Raymond Wong Ho-yin	Guest appearance
2015	Captain of Destiny	Unnamed Pirate	Cameo
2015	Under the Veil	Yuen Sam-Yueng	
2015	Raja Pahat	Adinda	
2016	K9 Cop	Fai Chung-lim	
2017	Revolving Heart	Leslie	
2017	Married but Available	Lucas Cheung	
2018	The Forgotten Valley	Luk Shui-fung	
2018	Apple-colada	Fung Bo	
2019	Wonder Women	Sheung Kim-hung	Nominated - TVB Anniversary Award for Best Actor Nominated - TVB Anniversary Award for My Favourite Male Character
2020	Forensic Heroes IV	Dr. Ko On (Ko Sir)	
2022	Modern Dynasty	Joe Ma Yiu-cho	
2022	In The Storm	Ho Wai-lim	
2024	The Heir to the Throne	Rio Chiu Kai-pong	

=== Film ===
Year	Title	Role	Notes
1997	Lifeline	Wong Ho-yin	a.k.a. Fireline
1998	Expect the Unexpected	Jimmy	
1998	The Conman		
1999	Where a Good Man Goes		
1999	Sunshine Cops	Elite fireman	
1999	Sealed with a Kiss	Paul	
2000	Needing You...	Roger Young	
2000	Help!!!	Handsome man	
2000	I Do	Mac Law Ho-yin	
2001	Wu Yen	Rebel Wu Tsi	
2002	Colour of Pain	Joe Cheung	
2002	Love Undercover	Hung	
2002	The Irresistible Piggies	Turtle	
2002	The Lion Roars	Long	
2002	The New Option	Hon Kin	
2002	The New Option - Run And Shoot	Hon Kin	U.S. title: The New Option - Kill in Central Restaurant
2003	Looking for Mister Perfect	Vincent	a.k.a. Looking for Mr. Perfect
2003	PTU	Mike's team member	a.k.a. Police Tactic Unit
2003	Honesty	Barry	
2003	Colour of the Truth	Inspector "Cola" Chan Lok-yin	
2003	Love Undercover 2: Love Mission	Kim Hung	
2003	Heroic Duo	Officer Yeung	
2003	The Death Curse	Nick Ting	
2003	The New Option - Puppet Hon	Hon Gin	U.S. Title: The New Option - Undercover
2003	The New Option - Saviour	Hon Gin	
2003	The New Option - Confrontation	Hon Gin	a.k.a. The New Option - Sniper
2003	The New Option - The Syndicate	Hon Gin	U.S. Title: The New Option: Back To Battle
2003	The New Option - The Final Showdown	Hon Gin	U.S. Title: The New Option - Point of No Return
2003	The New Option - Gold Rush	Hon Gin	a.k.a. The New Option - Assault Team
2003	The New Option - The Revenge	Hon Gin	U.S. Title: The New Option - Assassin
2003	The New Option - The Campaign	Hon Gin	
2004	Koma	Keung	
2004	Love is a Many Stupid Thing	Watson	
2004	Love Battlefield	Chow Chow	
2004	Hidden Heroes	Inspector Cheng Wai-ming	
2005	Slim till Dead	Bull	
2005	Set To Kill	Set to Kill	
2005	The Unusual Youth	Biggie	
2005	Fear of Intimacy		
2005	Election	Detective Wong	
2006	49 Days	Pang Shi	
2006	Love Undercover 3	Kim Hung	
2007	House of Mahjong	Chiu Sam-kwai	
2007	A Mob Story	Sing	
2007	Single Blog	Ma Bo-kin	
2007	Simply Actors	Alex	
2007	Hooked on You	Bowling instructor	Cameo
2007	Dead Air	Chan Kwok-fai	Unreleased; straight to DVD
2008	Besieged City	Kid	
2008	Scare 2 Die	Mahjong player C	Cameo
2008	Connected	Police Officer	Cameo
2010	Forget Me Not	Lee Chun-kit	Unreleased; straight to DVD
2011	I Love Hong Kong	Gangster	Cameo
2012	The Bounty		
2016	Three	Gangster	
2016	Show Me Your Love		
2016	A Time of Love 2		
2025	Behind the Shadows		

Awards and achievements
TVB Anniversary Awards
Preceded by Pierre Ngo for Rosy Business; Sweetness in the Salt	Most Improved Actor; 2010 for A Watchdog's Tale; When Lanes Merge; Can't Buy Me Love; No Regrets	Succeeded by MC Jin for Yes, Sir. Sorry, Sir!; Lives of Omission
My AOD Favourites Awards
Preceded by Pierre Ngo for No Regrets	Best Supporting Actor; 2011 for Twilight Investigation	Succeeded by Him Law for The Hippocratic Crush
