= Katy Kung =

Hong Kong actress

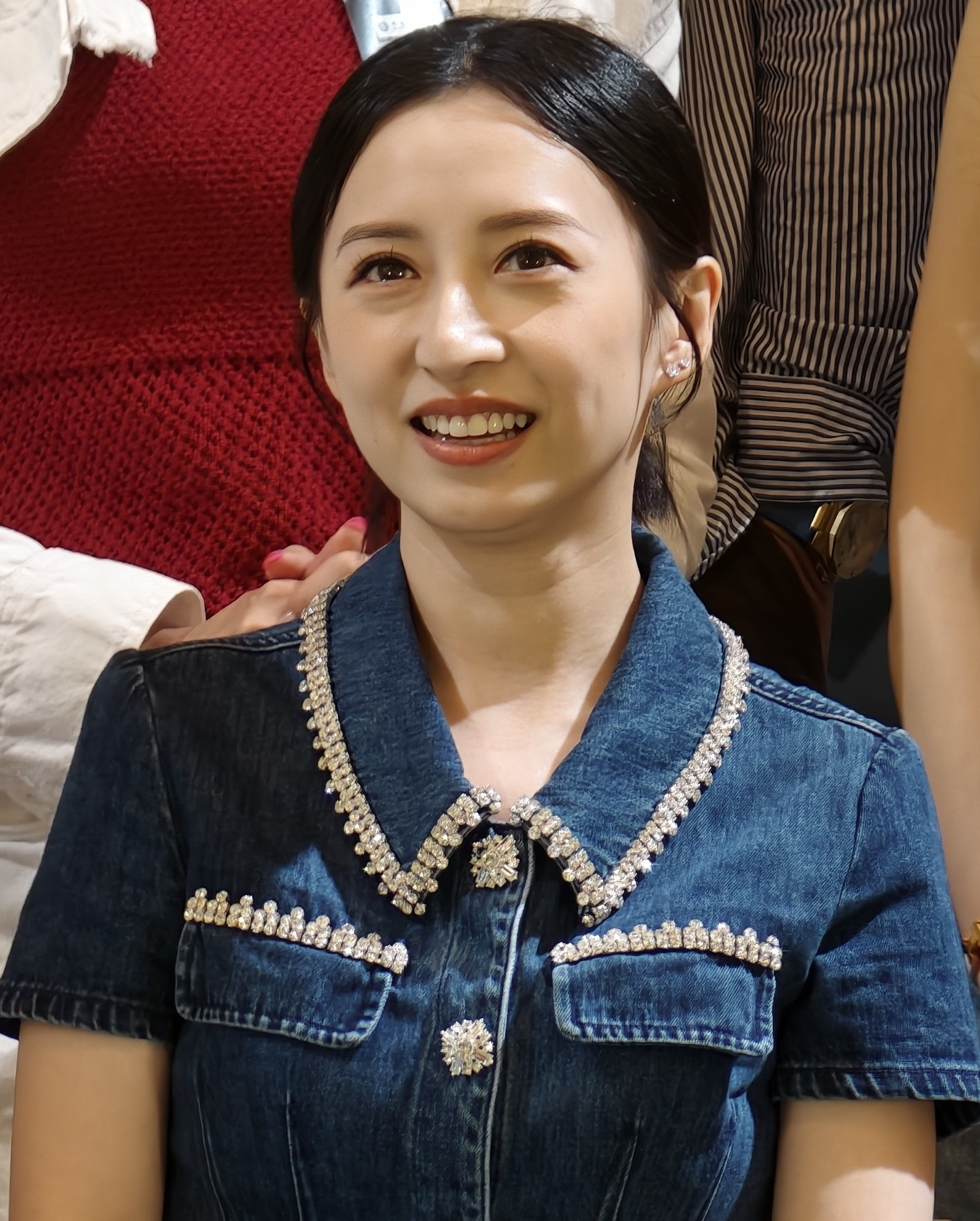
- Kung in May 2026
- Born: Hong Kong
- Occupations: Actress; television presenter
- Years active: 2006–present
- Notable work: Two Steps from Heaven; Death By Zero; Hong Kong Love Stories
- Awards: TVB Anniversary Awards – Best Actress; 2024 Big Biz Duel; Best Supporting Actress; 2016 Two Steps from Heaven; Most Popular Female Character; 2020 Hong Kong Love Stories; Favourite TVB Actress in Malaysia; 2020 Death By Zero

Chinese name
- Traditional Chinese: 龔嘉欣
- Simplified Chinese: 龚嘉欣
Transcriptions
Standard Mandarin
- Hanyu Pinyin: Gōng Jiāxīn
Yue: Cantonese
- Yale Romanization: Gūng Gāyān
- Jyutping: Gung1 Gaa1jan1

Katy Kung is a Hong Kong actress under the contract of TVB.

== Career ==
Katy Kung's career began at the age of 16, when she became a model for a magazine introduced to her by a friend. She later worked as a television presenter for two years at i-Cable before signing with TVB in 2008.

In 2016, Kung gained recognition with her performance in the drama Two Steps From Heaven, winning the Best Supporting Actress award at the 2016 TVB Anniversary Awards.

In 2020, Kung received attention and garnered praise from netizens for her performances in the dramas Death By Zero and Hong Kong Love Stories, eventually winning the Favourite TVB Actress in Malaysia and Most Popular Female Character awards at the 2020 TVB Anniversary Awards.

== Personal life ==
In November 2012, Kung hinted a breakup via Weibo with her boyfriend, Patrick Tang, whom she met in 2010 on the set of 7 Days in Life. Later in an interview, she admitted a breakup some time ago but did not specify the time.

Kung became good friends with co-actresses Grace Chan, Zoie Tam and Jessie Sum when filming the drama The Forgotten Valley.

== Filmography ==
=== Television dramas ===
Year	Title	Role	Notes
2008	Dressage to Win	Mary	Main Role
2009	Just Love II	Winnie	Cameo
2009	You're Hired	Staff	Cameo
2009	ICAC Investigators 2009	young Fong Tsz-chuen	Younger version of Sonjia Kwok’s character
2010	Ghost Writer	Ma Ping-ting	Supporting Role
2010	When Lanes Merge	Cheung Hiu-ching	Supporting Role
2011	7 Days in Life	Ho Siu-yan	Supporting Role Nominated — TVB Anniversary Award for Most Improved Female Artiste
2011	Be Home for Dinner	Julia Chung Sze-nga	Major Supporting Role Nominated — TVB Anniversary Award for Most Improved Female Artiste
2011	Ghetto Justice	Yam Yuen-yuen	Ep. 8 Nominated — TVB Anniversary Award for Most Improved Female Artiste
2011	The Life and Times of a Sentinel	Fung Sheung-hei	Supporting Role Nominated — TVB Anniversary Award for Most Improved Female Artiste
2011–12	Bottled Passion	Ko Yee-nga	Major Supporting Role Nominated — TVB Anniversary Award for Most Improved Female Artiste
2012	Gloves Come Off	Vicky Chong Po-kei	Supporting Role Nominated — TVB Anniversary Award for Most Improved Female Artiste
2012	No Good Either Way	Lily Chau Lei-lei	Supporting Role Nominated — TVB Anniversary Award for Most Improved Female Artiste
2012	The Last Steep Ascent	Ho Sai-man	Supporting Role Nominated — TVB Anniversary Award for Most Improved Female Artiste
2013	The Day of Days	Wong Siu-ying	Supporting Role
2013	Beauty at War	Buyamuci Muk-doh-yee	Supporting Role Nominated — TVB Anniversary Award for Best Supporting Actress
2013	Karma Rider	young Mok Sau-sze	Younger version of Amy Fan’s character
2014	Come Home Love	Gem Kau Ah-Yuk	Supporting Role
2014	Storm in a Cocoon	Kwan Lai-kuen	Supporting Role
2015	Romantic Repertoire	Joe Hon Hau-yee	Major Supporting Role
2015	Come Home Love 2	Lee Lok-yi	Main Role
2015	Under the Veil	Princess Lat Ka	Major Supporting Role Nominated — TVB Anniversary Award for Best Supporting Actress
2015	Captain of Destiny	Tung Suet	Supporting Role
2015-16	The Executioner	Chuk Siu-moon	Major Supporting Role Nominated — TVB Anniversary Award for Most Improved Female Artiste
2016	Two Steps from Heaven	Carmen Ching Sze-yu	Major Supporting Role Won — TVB Anniversary Award for Best Supporting Actress; Nominated — TVB Anniversary Award for Most Improved Female Artiste; Won — People's Choice Television Awards for Most Improved Female Artiste
2017	Bet Hur	young Lok Pik-kei	Younger version of Monica Chan’s character
2017	My Ages Apart	Vivian Sheung Ho-yan	Major Supporting Role Nominated — TVB Anniversary Award for Best Supporting Actress
2018	The Forgotten Valley	Tin Cho-yat	Main Role; Nominated — TVB Anniversary Award for Favourite TVB Actress in Malaysia; Nominated — TVB Anniversary Award for Favourite TVB Actress in Singapore
2019	Justice Bao: The First Year	Chun Heung-lin	Ep. 11-15 Nominated — TVB Anniversary Award for Best Supporting Actress
2020	The Dripping Sauce	Yip Sai-yiu	Main Role
2020	Death By Zero	"NaNa" Yik Lan (Dark Angel)	Main Role; Won — TVB Anniversary Award for Favourite TVB Actress in Malaysia; Nominated — TVB Anniversary Award for Best Actress (Top 5)
2020	Hong Kong Love Stories	Katy Yau Hoi-kei	Main Role; Won — TVB Anniversary Award for Most Popular Female Character
2020-21	The Offliners	Faye Wong Tsz-fei	Main Role; Nominated — TVB Anniversary Award for Best Actress; Nominated — TVB Anniversary Award for Most Popular Onscreen Partnership (with Owen Cheung)
2021	Battle of the Seven Sisters	Josephine Kam Sin-yan	Guest Appearance in Ep. 19-20
2022	Brutally Young 2.0	Moon Shum Yuet	Main Role; Nominated — TVB Anniversary Award for Best Actress; Nominated — TVB Anniversary Award for Most Popular Female Character (Top 10); Nominated — TVB Anniversary Award for Favourite TVB Actress in Malaysia
2022	Touch the Sky	Cheung Ning	Main Role; Nominated — TVB Anniversary Award for Best Actress; Nominated — TVB Anniversary Award for Most Popular Female Character; Nominated — TVB Anniversary Award for Favourite TVB Actress in Malaysia
2023	Treasure of Destiny	Chu Ying-kiu / Ngo Ying-kiu	Main Role; Nominated — TVB Anniversary Award for Best Actress
2023	Unchained Medley	Wan Lau-fong	Main Role; Nominated — TVB Anniversary Award for Best Actress (Top 5); Nominated — TVB Anniversary Award for Favourite TVB Actress in Greater Bay Area (Top 5); Nominated — TVB Anniversary Award for Favourite TVB Actress in Malaysia(Top 5)
2024	Big Biz Duel	Fong Fong	Main Role; Won — TVB Anniversary Award for Best Actress; Nominated — TVB Anniversary Award for Favourite TVB Actress in Greater Bay Area; Nominated — TVB Anniversary Award for Favourite TVB Actress in Malaysia

=== Films ===
Year	Title	Role	Notes
2008	Lady Cop & Papa Crook	Joey's subordinate	
2009	Love Connected	Yan-yan	
2009	I Corrupt All Cops	Sasa	
2009	Seven 2 One	Katy	
2010	The Jade and the Pearl	Princess Kung	
