= Gloves Come Off =

Hong Kong television series

- Promotional poster
- Genre: Drama, action
- Written by: Cheung Yeuk Sze; Cheung Chung Yan
- Starring: Kevin Cheng; Raymond Wong Ho-yin; Selena Lee; Natalie Tong; Kenny Wong; Nancy Wu; Power Chan; Edwin Siu; Florence Kwok
- Country of origin: Hong Kong
- Original language: Cantonese
- No. of episodes: 25

Production
- Producer: Marco Law
- Production location: Hong Kong
- Camera setup: Multi camera
- Production company: Television Broadcasts Limited

Original release
- Network: TVB Jade
- Release: 16 April – 18 May 2012

Gloves Come Off
- Traditional Chinese: 拳王
- Simplified Chinese: 拳王
- Literal meaning: "fist king"
Transcriptions
Standard Mandarin
- Hanyu Pinyin: Quán Wáng
Yue: Cantonese
- Jyutping: Kyun4 Wong4

Gloves Come Off is a Hong Kong television action drama produced by TVB under executive producer Marco Law, starring Kevin Cheng, Raymond Wong Ho-yin, Selena Lee and Natalie Tong as the main leads. A costume fitting was held on 29 March 2011 at Tseung Kwan O TVB City Studio One at 12:30PM. A worship ceremony was then held on 28 April 2011 at Tseung Kwan O TVB City Studio 12 at 2:00PM where filming began. Filming ended in July. The first episode was aired on April 16, 2012 on the TVB Jade channel, simultaneously with TVB's overseas partners and affiliates.

== Synopsis ==
Tong Shap Yat (Kevin Cheng) was a devoted adherent of Muay Thai, wishing to prove himself against the best practitioners of the art, he fought in underground matches in Thailand, and out of a desire to win accidentally kills an opponent. Jailed for manslaughter for 7 years, Tong returns to Hong Kong 11 years later a changed man. During his time in prison his wife died of an untreated illness leaving Tong a lone parent and sole provider for his son. A remorseful Tong attempts to wash his hands of Muay Thai and seeks to lead a peaceful and peaceable life.

Ko Wai Ting (Kenny Wong) is Tong Shap Yat's friend, and they were students together in the same Muay Thai gym, in the intervening years Ko has built a successful Muay Thai boxercise business, based on his own success and the success of his stable of fighters in competition. With his stable depleted by injuries and defections, leaving him weak in some weight classes, Ko attempts to convince Tong to return to the ring. The promised purse being enough to lift Tong from his hand-to-mouth existence as a security guard and odd-job man and allow him to better provide for his son.

Pat Ka Shing (Raymond Wong Ho-yin), although athletic and fit, is a newcomer to Muay Thai, saved by Ko Wai Ting from a beating by muggers, Pat joins Ko's gym to learn enough to protect himself, but initially has no wish to fight in competition. A natural at the sport, Pat is persuaded to fight and falls in love with the experience; Muay Thai giving him a purpose and direction in life that he had previously lacked.

While each gains from being in the ring, be it money, glory or self-esteem, they each come to desire to know just how good they are and which of them is the true "King of the ring".

== Cast ==
=== The Tong family ===
Cast	Role	Description
Kevin Cheng	Tong Sap Yat 唐拾一	Originally security guard, later boxer trainer Cheuk Man's husband Tong Kat's father See "Tang Lung" Muay Thai Gym
Kate Tsui	Cheuk Man 卓 敏	Tong Sap Yat's wife Tong Gat's mother Deceased
Leung Chi Ho	Tong Kat 唐 吉	Tong Sap Yat and Cheuk Man's son

=== The Pat family ===
Cast	Role	Description
Chow Chung	Pat Kau Yan 畢求仁	Tofu store owner Ng Suet Fong's husband Pat Ka Wah and Pat Ka Sing's father Yuen Mei Mei and Yam Ho Kau's father in-law
Angelina Lo	Ng Suet Fong 吳雪芳	Pat Kau Yan's wife Pat Ka Wah and Pat Ka Sing's mother Yam Ho Kau's mother in-law
Michael Choi	Pat Ka Wah 畢家華	Pat Kau Yan and Ng Suet Fong's elder son Pat Ka Shing's elder brother Yuen Mei Mei's husband
Pancy Chan	Yuen Mei Mei 阮美美	Pat Kau Yan and Ng Suet Fong's daughter-in-law Pat Ka Wah's wife
Raymond Wong Ho-yin	Pat Ka Sing 畢加誠	Nak muay Office assistant Pat Kau Yan and Ng Suet Fong's son Pat Ka Wah's younger brother Tsui Shuk Wai's boyfriend, later broke up Yam Ho Kau's boyfriend, later husband Cheats on Yam Ho Kau with Chong Po Kei (Wan Tong)
Natalie Tong	Yam Ho Kau 任好逑	Yam Kwok Lung's daughter Pat Kau Yan and Ng Suet Fong's daughter in-law Pat Ka Sing's girlfriend, later wife Accidentally killed by Chu Sai-cheung in episode 23

=== The Yam family ===
Cast	Role	Description
Lau Kong	Yam Kwok Lung 任國龍	Muay Thai gym owner Yam Ho Kau's father Tong Sap Yat and Ko Wai Ting's coach
Natalie Tong	Yam Ho Kau 任好逑	Yam Kwok Lung's daughter See The Pat family

=== "Tang Lung" Muay Thai Gym ===
Cast	Role	Description
Lau Kong	Yam Kwok Lung 任國龍	Muay Thai gym owner See The Yam family
Kevin Cheng	Tong Sap Yat 唐拾一	Former underground nak muay in Thailand; Security nak muay Yam Kwok Lung's disciple Cheuk Man's husband They meet again at the church where they got married, but she does not remember him.
Nancy Wu	Ting Yan Chi 丁恩慈	Deaf nak muay ying Chu Sai Cheung's girlfriend, later broke up Loves Tong Sap Yat, but remain his pupil instead.
Power Chan	Chu Sai Cheung 朱細祥	Muay Thai gym worker Ting Yan Chi's boyfriend, later broke up Betrays Pat Ka Sing and Ko Wai Ting; Inadvertently killed Yam Ho Kau (Main Villain)
Eddie Law (羅天池)	Lo Tao 羅 濤	Muay Thai coach Tsui Wing's opponent
Vivi Lee (李美慧)	Ho Pui Yi 何佩儀	Muay Thai coach
Otto Chan (陳志健)	Dai Zi Lik 戴子力	Nak muay

=== "The Champ" Muay Thai Gym (later Disbanded) ===
Cast	Role	Description
Kenny Wong (黃德斌)	Ko Wai Ting 高偉廷	Muay Thai gym owner Former underground nak muay in Thailand; Yam Kwok Lung's disciple Tong Sap Yat's senior Chong Po Lam's husband Pat Ka Sing's master
Raymond Wong Ho-yin	Pat Ka Sing (Buddy) 畢加誠	See The Pat family
Thomas Sin (冼灝英)		Muay Thai coach Eric Li's senior
Eric Li	文健生	Muay Thay coach Thomas Sin's junior Chan Wing Chun's son
Tsui Wing		Nak muay, later Muay Thai coach Eddie Law's opponent
Gregory Lee (李泳豪)		Nak muay
Lee Ka (李嘉)	Lui King 呂景	Nak muay
Benjamin Yuen	Lai Ying 黎英	Nak muay

=== The Ko family ===
Cast	Role	Description
Kenny Wong (黃德斌)	Ko Wai Ting 高偉廷	Chong Po Lam's husband See "The Champ" Muay Thai Gym
Florence Kwok	Chong Po Lam 莊寶琳	Ko Wai Ting's wife Chong Po Kei's elder sister
Wong Ho Ying	Miko	Ko Wai Ting and Chong Po Lam's daughter
Katy Kung	Chong Po Kei 莊寶琪	Chong Po Lam's younger sister Pat Ka Sing's mistress, later broke up Was a villain, but then helped the Allies by becoming a witness to the Yam Ho Kau murder, which led to the pursuit of Chu Sai Cheung (Main Villain)

=== The Leung family ===
Cast	Role	Description
Edwin Siu	Leung Yan Wah 梁恩樺	Telecom company president Chai Pak Fai's boyfriend, later husband Gets paralyzed from waist down, revealed in episode 18; Begins to abuse Chai Pak Fai; Commits suicide in episode 19 (Semi-Villain)
Selena Li	Chai Pak Fai 齊柏暉	Leung Yan Wah's girlfriend, later wife Later gets abused by Leung Yan Wah; Has alzheimer's, revealed in episode 23, forgets almost everything

=== Other cast ===
Cast	Role	Description
Bowie Wu (胡楓)	Cheuk Chan Fan 卓鎮凡	Cheuk Man's father
Pancy Chan (陳佩思)	Pat Ka Sing's big sister	
Catherine Chau (周家怡)	Tsui Suk Wai 徐淑惠	Property sales agent Pat Ka Sing's girlfriend, later broke up
Albert Lo (羅浩楷)	Chai Kam Wing 齊錦榮	Chai Pak Fai's father
Hugo Wong (黃子衡)	"The Champ" employee	
Brian Wong (黃澤鋒)		Security
Wong Wai Tak (王維德)		Security
Wong Fung King (黃鳳瓊)		
Lee Hing Wah (李興華)		
Lee Ka Ting (李家鼎)	One of the Muay Thai boxing gym owners	
Daniel Kwok (郭卓樺)		
Dickson Wong		
Yeung Chiu Hoi (楊潮凱)		
Brian Chu (朱敏瀚)		
William Chak	Yam Ho Kau's ex-boyfriend	
Chan Wing Chun (陳榮峻)		Eric Li's father
Eric Li	Tang Lung's boxer	
Tang Ying Man (鄧英敏)		
Ching Wai (菁瑋)		
Tina Shek (石天欣)		Nurse
Plato Lai (黎國輝)		Journalist
Lui Hei (呂熙)		
Tse Cheuk Yin (謝卓言)		
Josephine Shum (岑寶兒)		
Lam Ying Hung (林影紅)		
Yeung Hung Chun (楊鴻俊)		
Oscar Chan (陳堃)		
Cheng Fan Sang (鄭藩生)	Chow Chung Chung 周忠中	"Cheung Tin Enterprise" office assistant
Owen Ng (吳雲甫)		
Fong Siu Chung (方紹聰)		

== Awards and nominations ==
- Nominated: My AOD Favorites for My Favorite Drama
- Nominated: My AOD Favorites for My Favorite On Screen Couple (Raymond Wong and Natalie Tong)
- Nominated: My AOD Favorites for My Favorite Actors in a Leading Role (Kevin Cheng and Raymond Wong)
- Won: My AOD Favorites for My Favorite Actress in a Supporting Role (Nancy Wu)
- Nominated: TVB Anniversary Awards for Best Drama
- Nominated: TVB Anniversary Awards for Best Actor (Kevin Cheng)
- Nominated: TVB Anniversary Awards for Best Actor (Raymond Wong)
- Nominated: TVB Anniversary Awards for Best Actress (Natalie Tong)
- Nominated: TVB Anniversary Awards for Most Improved Male Artiste (Edwin Siu)
- Nominated: TVB Anniversary Awards for Most Improved Female Artiste (Katy Kung)
- Won: TVB Anniversary Awards for Best Supporting Actress (Nancy Wu)
- Won: Asian Television Awards for Best Actress in a Supporting Role (Nancy Wu)

== Viewership ratings ==
	Week	Episodes	Average Points	Peaking Points	References
1	April 16–20, 2012	1 — 5	29	31	
2	April 23–27, 2012	6 — 10	29	—	
3	April 30 - May 4, 2012	11 — 15	30	33	
4	May 7–11, 2012	16 — 20	30	—	
5	May 14–17, 2012	21 — 24	31	35	
5	May 18, 2012	25	34	—	

== International broadcast ==
- Malaysia - NTV7 (Malaysia)
