= Let It Be Love =

Hong Kong drama television series

- Promotional poster
- Also known as: 4 In Love
- Genre: Modern romance
- Written by: Chow Yuk Ming
- Starring: Moses Chan; Charmaine Sheh; Kenny Wong; Rachel Kan; King Kong; Florence Kwok; Elvina Kong; Tracy Ip; Wai Ka Hung; Patrick Dunn
- Theme music composer: Tang Chi Wai
- Opening theme: Fall in Love by Moses Chan
- Country of origin: Hong Kong
- Original language: Cantonese
- No. of episodes: 20

Production
- Producer: Jonathan Chik
- Production location: Hong Kong
- Camera setup: Multi camera
- Production company: Television Broadcasts Limited

Original release
- Network: TVB Jade
- Release: January 31 – February 24, 2012

Related
- Wish and Switch; Queens of Diamonds and Hearts

Let It Be Love, also known as 4 In Love, is a Hong Kong modern romance drama produced by TVB and starring Moses Chan, Charmaine Sheh and Kenny Wong. An internal costume fitting was held on 27 May 2011 and the official costume fitting was held on 3 June 2011 at Tseung Kwan O TVB City Studio One at 12:30 pm. The premiere episode aired on 31 January 2012.

== Plot summary ==
Tung Hoi Yiu, Chloe (Charmaine Sheh), is an international superstar, and as a publicity stunt she visits longtime fan Yu Chun Tung (Moses Chan), in hospital and their lives become entangled. The tabloid press and blogosphere feed on each other to create the impression that the two are in fact dating. In order to control the news coverage, Chloe's management company creates the illusion of a lightning romance and an equally quick break up between Chloe and Chun Tung, with Chloe being portrayed as the wronged party. Since she was 16 and discovered by a talent spotter, Chloe's life and career has been under the control of her cousin Tung Mei Mei, May (Florence Kwok). To escape the manipulations of her cousin, Chloe announces her retirement from the entertainment industry. However, in the short period of their supposed romance Chloe has come to care for Chun Tung, and May uses this to force Chloe to return to the entertainment industry.

Whilst abroad Chloe discovers the extent of May's manipulations - that May has been feigning terminal cancer and that her previous boyfriend broke up with her because May used her phone to send a Dear John message. In a fit of pique and to the surprise of everyone, including Chun Tung, Chloe holds a spot news conference in which she announces her imminent marriage to Chun Tung. Despite only superficially knowing Chloe, Chun Tung can't believe his luck and agrees to the marriage proposal. May and her coterie of followers are forced to play along with Chloe, but work to drive the couple apart. Despite finding some happiness together, Chun Tung and Chloe have little in the way of understanding and trust between each other and, with only minimal help from May, the couple part.

However, May realises that Chloe has truly fallen in love with Chun Tung. May sees in Chloe's latest film performance a rejection of things that Chloe had previously held dear and that the only reason for this is that her breaking with Chun Tung has broken her spirit. Filled with guilt May attempts to help Chun Tung understand Chloe in the hope that in doing so he can come to love the real Chloe and not the illusion presented to the world.

As they negotiate the travails of life and love, Chloe and Chun Tung's lives cross and touch with other couples making their own choices. Chung Ping Leung (Wai Ka Hung) and Elsa (Tracy Ip) are kindred souls, well matched by personality but not by physique. Nick (King Kong Lee) and Hayley (Rachel Kan) have both been scarred by bad relationships and are unable to form meaningful bonds with the opposite sex. However, when Nick becomes impotent they find that they have more in common than just a long history of one-night stands. Poon Chun Him's (Kenny Wong) relationships are perpetually out of sync. Whenever he is ready for marriage his girlfriends are not and vice versa. When his friends Yeung Chi Wah (Patrick Dunn) and Fung Yiu Dan, Kelly (Elvina Kong) divorce after it is discovered that Yeung has been harbouring a secret homosexual infatuation for him, Poon and Kelly find themselves being drawn to each other, but this time will their timing be in sync?

== Cast ==
=== Main cast ===
Cast	Role	Description	Age
Moses Chan	Yu Chun Tung (Lucas) 余鎮東	Electric appliance salesperson Tung Hoi Yiu's longtime fan Tung Hoi Yiu's boyfriend	40
Charmaine Sheh	Tung Hoi Yiu (Chloe) 童靄瑤	International superstar Tung Mei Mei's cousin Yu Chun Tung's girlfriend	30
Kenny Wong	Poon Chun Him (Cyrus) 潘俊謙	Sports news reporter Law Wing Chi and Tong Hau Ling's ex-boyfriend Fung Yiu Dan's friend, later boyfriend	40
Rachel Kan	Cheung Hei Yin (Hayley) 張希妍	Lawyer; Lam Lik Hang's girlfriend	30
King Kong	Lam Lik Hang (Nick) 林力行	Financer; Cheung Hei Yin's boyfriend	32
Elvina Kong	Fung Yiu Dan (Kelly) 馮姚丹	News anchor Yeung Chi Wah's wife, later divorced Poon Chun Him's girlfriend	35
Wai Ka Hung	Chung Ping Leung (Danny) 鍾炳良	Tobacco control inspector Ha Tong Tong's ex-boyfriend Chow Sze Ching's boyfriend	38
Tracy Ip	Chow Sze Ching (Elsa) 周思澄	Corporate affairs officer Lau Yin Wai's ex-girlfriend Chung Ping Leung's girlfriend	28

=== Tung Family ===
Cast	Role	Description
Florence Kwok	Tung Mei Mei (May) 童美美	Entertainment agent owner Tung Hoi Yiu's cousin and manager
Charmaine Sheh	Tung Hoi Yiu (Chloe) 童靄瑤	International superstar Tung Mei Mei's cousin Yu Chun Tung's girlfriend

=== Law Family ===
Cast	Role	Description
Yu Chi Ming	Law Sau Yu 羅守譽	Law Wing Chi's father
Queenie Chu	Law Wing Chi (Emily) 羅詠芝	Law Sau Yu's daughter Poon Chun Him's ex-girlfriend

=== Chow Family ===
Cast	Role	Description
Sin Ho Ying	Chow Sze Hang 周思恆	Chow Sze Ching's brother
Tracy Ip	Chow Sze Ching (Elsa) 周思澄	Corporate affairs officer Chow Sze Hang's sister Lau Yin Wai's ex-girlfriend Chung Ping Leung's girlfriend

=== Chung Family ===
Cast	Role	Description
Lee Fung	Fong Chui Yuk 方翠玉	Chung Ping Leung's mother
Wai Ka Hung	Chung Ping Leung 鍾炳良	Tobacco control inspector Ha Tong Tong's ex-boyfriend Chow Sze Ching's boyfriend

=== Other cast ===
Cast	Role	Description
Lau Dan	Fung Chi Ming 馮志明	Electric appliance company owner Loves Ho Chun Kiu
Mary Hon	Ho Chun Kiu 何春嬌	Loves Fung Chi Ming
Patrick Dunn	Yeung Chi Wah 楊志華	News anchor Fung Yiu Dan's husband, later divorced
Seth Leslie	Entertainment Reporter	Reports on Chloe's break up with her "MK fiance".
Janet Chow	Tong Hau Ling 唐巧寧	Nurse; Poon Chun Him's ex-girlfriend
Becky Lee	Ha Tong Tong 夏棠棠	Yoga Instructor; Chung Ping Leung's ex-girlfriend
Peter Lai (黎彼得)		
Lily Leung (梁舜燕)		
Calinda Chan (陳宛蔚)		
Fanny Ip (葉凱茵)		
Steven Ho (何啟南)		
Eddy Ho (何偉業)		
Summer Joe Ha (夏竹欣)	Ng Mau Tan 吳牡丹	
Stephen Huynh	Lau Yin Wai 劉彥瑋	Chow Sze Ching's ex-boyfriend
Kim Fu (傅劍虹)		
Vincent Cheung (張漢斌)		
Mikako Leung (梁珈詠)		
Nadia Lun (倫紫玄)		Make-up artist (Emily)
Dolby Kwan (關浩揚)		
Candy Chu		
Cheung Kwok Keung (張國強)		Shaolin monk
Hugo Wong (黃子衡)		
Sunny Tai (戴耀明)		

== Viewership ratings ==
Week	Originally Aired	Episodes	Average Points	Peaking Points	References
1	January 31 - February 3, 2012	1 — 5	28	31	
2	February 6–10, 2012	6 — 10	27	—	
3	February 13–17, 2012	11 — 15	28	30	
4	February 20–24, 2012	16 — 20	29	31	
