= Bride Wannabes =

2012 Hong Kong TV series

Bride Wannabes (Chinese: 盛女愛作戰) is a popular 2012 Hong Kong television series that features five women in their 30s. It was viewed by 1.7 million, almost 25% of the Hong Kong population. The show was criticized by some as more "an advertising package than a reality show" and reported to have "23 commercial operators in the first five shows, including dating companies, beauty salons and restaurants".

== See also ==
- Bachelors at War (2013) Hong Kong TV reality show
