= Wish and Switch =

- Promotional poster
- 換樂無窮
- Genre: Comedy, Romance
- Starring: Myolie Wu; Johnson Lee; Vincent Wong; Selena Lee; Angela Tong; Kiki Sheung; Lau Kong; Ram Chiang; Mimi Choo
- Opening theme: 交換快樂 by Myolie Wu and Johnson Lee
- Country of origin: Hong Kong
- Original language: Cantonese
- No. of episodes: 20

Production
- Executive producer: Lam Chi Wah

Original release
- Network: TVB Jade
- Release: January 3 – January 29, 2012

Related
- Bottled Passion; Let It Be Love

Wish and Switch is a 2012 Hong Kong TVB drama first broadcast on January 3, 2012. It stars Myolie Wu, Johnson Lee, Vincent Wong, Selena Lee and Angela Tong. It is slated to run for 20 episodes.

Wish and Switch is a modern comedy drama about how housewife Fan Suk Heung stumbled upon a website, www.換得樂.com, offering to exchange anything that she wants with something in her possession and how her obsession with the website brings about comedic unforeseen consequences.

== Cast ==
=== Koo family ===
| Cast | Role | Description |
|---|---|---|
| Lau Kong | Koo Wing Sze | Yes Sir; Retired physical education teacher Fung Yau Yi's husband later divorced Koo Ka Kam and Koo Ka Yan's father Fan Suk Heung's father-in-law Yip Yuk Hing and Chan Ho's grandfather |
| Mimi Chu | Fung Yau Yi | Yes Madam; Sales promoter Koo Wing Si's wife later divorced Koo Ka Kam and Koo Ka Yan's mother Fan Suk Heung's mother-in-law Yip Yuk Hing and Chan Ho's grandmother Applied for divorce in Episode 3 |
| Angela Tong | Koo Ka Kam | Kim、活家禽; Koo Wing Si and Fung Yau Yi's daughter Koo Ka Yan's elder sister Yip Yuen's ex-wife Yip Yuk Hing's mother Samuel's girlfriend Chan Ho's mother In love with Fan Tai Kit |
| Johnson Lee | Koo Ka Yan | Manager at King Lap Group; Fan Suk Heung's husband Koo Wing Si and Fung Yau Yi's son Koo Wing Kam's younger brother Yip Yuk Hing and Chan Ho's uncle Promoted to managerial status in episode 1 |
| Myolie Wu | Fan Suk Heung | Sarah; Exchanged identity with Hou Yurk Hoi and became Hailey; Supervisor at King Lap Group; Koo Ka Yan's wife Fan Tai Kit's younger sister Fan Tai Hei's elder sister Koo Wing Si and Fung Yau Yi's daughter-in-law Koo Ka Kam's sister-in-law Yip Yuk Hing and Chan Ho's aunt Hou Yurk Hoi's best friend Killed by triads in Episode 20 |
| Tina Shek | Yip Yuk Hing | Jade; Student; Yip Yuen and Koo Ka Kam's daughter Koo Ka Yan and Fan Suk Heung's niece Koo Wing Si and Fung Yau Yi's granddaughter Chan Ho's half-sister |
| | Chan Ho | Koo Wing Si and Fung Yau Yi's grandson Chan Sam Mei and Koo Ka Kam's son Koo Ka Yan and Fan Suk Heung's nephew Yip Yuk Hing's half-brother Carried away by Chan Sam Hei in Episode 8 Carried back by Chan Sam Mei to Koo Ka Kam in Episode 16 |

=== Fan family ===
| Cast | Role | Description |
|---|---|---|
| Cheng Shu Fung | Fan Fat | Fan Tai Kit, Fan Suk Heung, Fai Tai Hei's father |
| Ram Chiang | Fan Tai Kit | Street protester Fan Fat's son Fan Suk Heung's older brother Fan Tai Hei's half-brother In love with Koo Ka Kam |
| Myolie Wu | Fan Suk Heung | Sarah; Fan Fat's daughter Fan Tai Kit's younger sister Fan Tai Hei's half-sister See Koo family |
| Sheh Kit Wah | Fan Tai Hei | Fan Fat's son Fan Tai Kit and Fuk Suk Heung's half-brother |

=== Wing family ===
| Cast | Role | Description |
|---|---|---|
| Kiki Sheung | Lui Wong | Wing Yiu's mother Hou Yurk Hoi's mother-in-law |
| Vincent Wong | Wing Yiu | Wayne; Lui Wong's son Hou Yurk Hoi's fake husband but really loves Hailey; Divorced in Episode 15, but remarried in Episode 20 |
| Selena Li | Hou Yurk Hoi | Hailey、海狗(Designed said by Fan Suk Heung); Wing Yiu's fake wife, but really loves Wing Yiu; Lui Wong's daughter-in-law Fan Suk Heung's best friend Exchanged identity with Fan Suk Heung and became Sarah; Divorced in Episode 15, but remarried in Episode 20 |
| Patrick Dunn | Ying Bun | Benjamin; Wing's butler |

=== King Lap Group (勁立集團) Fast Food Chain ===
| Cast | Role | Description |
|---|---|---|
| Sheung Tin-ngor | Lui Wong | CEO |
| Yu Chi-ming | Tony Arevalo | Manager |
| Vincent Wong | Wing Yiu | Deputy CEO |
| Selena Li | Hou Yurk Hoi | Public Relations Senior Manager |
| Tony Yee | Law Yau Fat | Manager |
| Johnson Lee | Koo Ka Yan | Manager Trainee |
| Myolie Wu | Fan Suk Heung | Officer |

=== Other casts ===
| Cast | Role | Description |
|---|---|---|
| Tsang Wai-kuen | Yip Yuen | Magician; Koo Ka Kum's ex-husband Yip Yuk Hing's father |
| Max Cheung | Chan Sam Mei | Koo Ka Kam's ex-boyfriend Chan Ho's father Covered up Koo Ka Kam and left Hong Kong with his son in Episode 8 Carried Chan Ho back to Koo Ka Kum after finding Chan Ho has heart attack in Episode 16 |
| Wong Chak Fung | Man | Street protester Fan Tai Kit's friend |
| Law Tin Chi | Mo | Street protester Fan Tai Kit's friend |
| Sin Ho Ying | Ying | Street protester Fan Tai Kit's friend |

== Viewership ratings ==
| Week | Originally Aired | Episodes | Average Points | Peaking Points | References |
|---|---|---|---|---|---|
| 1 | January 3–6, 2012 | 1 — 4 | 28 | 31 | |
| 2 | January 9–13, 2012 | 5 — 9 | 26 | 28 | |
| 3 | January 16–20, 2012 | 10 — 14 | 25 | 28 | |
| 4 | January 24–27, 2012 | 15 — 18 | 26 | 29 | |
| 4 | January 29, 2012 | 19 — 20 | 33 | 37 | |
