= 2008 Astro Wah Lai Toi Drama Awards =

- Date: 21 February 2009
- Location: Arena of Stars

Television/radio coverage
- Network: Astro Wah Lai Toi
- Produced by: Astro, TVB

The 2008 Astro Wah Lai Toi Drama Awards (simplified Chinese: Astro华丽台电视剧大奖2008; traditional Chinese: Astro華麗臺電視劇大獎2008), presented by Astro in Malaysia, was an awards ceremony that recognised the best Hong Kong television programmes that had aired on Malaysia's Astro Wah Lai Toi in 2008. The ceremony was televised live on Astro's Cantonese channel, Astro Wah Lai Toi.

The ceremony took place on 21 February 2009 at the Arena of Stars in Kuala Lumpur, Malaysia. Winners were 100% based on results from popular vote. The voting period lasted from 17 January 2009 to 17 February 2009.

The biggest winner was Heart of Greed, winning nine awards including My Favourite Actor, My Favourite Actress, and My Favourite Drama.

== Winners and nominees ==
Top five nominees are in bold.

| My Favourite Actor in a Leading Role | My Favourite Actress in a Leading Role |
|---|---|
| **Moses Chan as Tong Chi-on in Heart of Greed**; **Bobby Au-yeung as Chai Foon-cheung in Dicey Business**; **Ha Yu as Tong Yan-kai in Heart of Greed**; **Damian Lau as Wah Man-hon in The Drive of Life**; **Raymond Lam as Wah Chun-bong in The Drive of Life**; Joe Ma as Dai Lap-yan in Maidens' Vow; Bosco Wong as Lui To in The Price of Greed; Roger Kwok as Law Dai-dei in Glittering Days; Michael Tao as Cheung King-fung in On the First Beat; Ron Ng as Chung Lap-yan in On the First Beat | **Louise Lee as Ling Hau in Heart of Greed**; **Jessica Hsuan as Ling Ching-wan in Dicey Business**; **Charmaine Sheh as Wing Sau-fung in The Drive of Life**; **Susanna Kwan as Frances Wong in Heart of Greed**; **Linda Chung as Sheung Joi-sum in Heart of Greed**; Myolie Wu as Ho Mei-tin in To Grow with Love; Esther Kwan as Wong Ka-nam in Best Selling Secrets; Gigi Lai as Yam Chi-wah in Life Art; Sheren Tang as Mung Ka-Ka The Family Link; Sonija Kwok as Yuen Wai-neh in On the First Beat |
| My Favourite Drama | My Favourite Drama Theme Song |
| **Heart of Greed**; The Brink of Law; Dicey Business; On the First Beat; The Drive of Life | **"Speechless" (讲不出声) by Susanna Kwan — Heart of Greed**; "Eager to See" (先赌为快) by Hacken Lee — Dicey Business; "Breakthrough" (突围) by Steven Ma & Ron Ng — The Brink of Law; "The Drive of Life" (岁月风云) by Hacken Lee & Steve Chou — The Drive of Life; "Devil's Disciples" (強劍) by Kevin Cheng & Bosco Wong — Devil's Disciples |
| My Favourite Supporting Character | My Favourite Extreme Appearance |
| **Benz Hui as Chow Fuk-wing in Dicey Business**; Louis Yuen as Ling Bo in Heart of Greed; Kingdom Yuen as Lo Sei-leung in The Price of Greed; Li Shing-cheong as Sheung Joi-tak in Heart of Greed; Lily Leung as Wong Lai-mei in Heart of Greed | **Myolie Wu as Ho Mei-tin in To Grow with Love**; Tavia Yeung as Mimi in Dicey Business; Bosco Wong as Cheung Loi-fu in Dicey Business; Michael Tse as Joe in The Family Link; Roger Kwok as Lo Dai-dei in Glittering Days |
| My Favourite On-Screen Couple | My Most Unforgettable Kiss |
| **Linda Chung and Raymond Lam in Heart of Greed**; Jessica Hsuan and Bobby Au-yeung in Dicey Business; Linda Chung and Moses Chan in Heart of Greed; Sonija Kwok and Michael Tao in On the First Beat; Charmaine Sheh and Raymond Lam in The Drive of Life | **Charmaine Sheh and Raymond Lam in The Drive of Life**; Jessica Hsuan and Michael Miu in Dicey Business; Linda Chung and Raymond Lam in Heart of Greed; Sonija Kwok and Michael Tao in On the First Beat; Bernice Liu and Steven Ma in The Brink of Law |
| My Most Unforgettable Villain | My Most Unforgettable Scene |
| **Shirley Yeung in The Brink of Law**; Sammul Chan in The Price of Greed; Michelle Yim in The Brink of Law; Lawrence Ng Wai-kwok in The Drive of Life; Susanna Kwan in Heart of Greed | **Ling-hau confronts Frances and lists accusations — Heart of Greed**; Fuk-wing convinces Ching-chor to change his ways — Dicey Business; Ching-wan gets really drunk — Dicey Business; Chi-ko sees his father's last letter — The Brink of Law; Lik-keung imagines himself dancing with Donna — Steps |
| My Top 12 Favourite Drama Characters | |
| Myolie Wu as Ho Mei-tin in To Grow with Love; Bobby Au-yeung as Chai Foon-cheung in Dicey Business; Jessica Hsuan as Lee Ching-wan in Dicey Business; Tavia Yeung as Tam Chu-mei in Dicey Business; Joe Ma as Dai Lap-yan in Maidens' Vow; Bosco Wong as Lui To in The Price of Greed; Moses Chan as Tong Chi-on in Heart of Greed; Louise Lee as Ling Hau in Heart of Greed; Ron Ng as Chung Lap-yan in On the First Beat; Charmaine Sheh as Wing Sau-fung in The Drive of Life; Raymond Lam as Wah Chun-bong in The Drive of Life; Linda Chung as Sheung Joi-sum in Heart of Greed | |
