= Au Revoir Shanghai =

2005 Hong Kong television series

- Promo poster
- 上海傳奇
- Genre: Period Drama
- Starring: Michael Miu; Bosco Wong; Anne Heung; Shirley Yeung
- Opening theme: Mou Jan Ngoi ("Unattended Love" - 無人愛) by Bosco Wong
- Country of origin: Hong Kong
- Original language: Cantonese
- No. of episodes: 20

Production
- Running time: 45 minutes (approx.)

Original release
- Network: TVB

Au Revoir Shanghai
- Intertitle
- Traditional Chinese: 上海傳奇
- Simplified Chinese: 上海传奇
- Literal meaning: The Legend in Shanghai
Transcriptions
Yue: Cantonese
- Jyutping: Soeng5 Hoi2 Cyun4 Gei1

Au Revoir Shanghai is a TVB period drama series produced in 2005, released overseas in May 2006, and aired on TVB Pay Vision Channel in August 2008.

== Synopsis ==
Nip Jun was a hit man but decided to leave the mafia to start a new life with his wife and daughter but tragedy stuck when his wife was killed in a car accident. Man Wa is Nip Jun's daughter and they own a restaurant in Shanghai. Kow Jai is an orphan who was mentored by Jun. He starts to develop feelings for Jun's daughter, Man Wa.

== Cast ==
Cast	Role	Description
Michael Miu	Nip Jun 聶進	Dumpling Restaurant Owner; Tong Yan's husband. Nip Man-Wah's father.
Bosco Wong	Shek Sai-Gau 石世九	Nip Man-Wah's lover.
Shirley Yeung	Nip Man-Wah 聶曼華	Nip Jun's daughter. Shek Sai-Gau's lover.
Anne Heung	Ho Shui-Sau 何水秀	Ma Jo-Cheung's wife.
Derek Kok	Hoh Jan-Bon 賀震邦	Police Officer
Eddy Ko	Ku Cheung-Shing 顧長城	Triad Leader
Power Chan	Ku Hok-Chi (Sam) 顧學之	Ku Cheung-Shing's son.
Patrick Dunn	Ma Jo-Cheung 馬祖祥	Ho Shui-Sau's deceased husband.
Sonija Kwok (cameo)	Tong Yan 唐茵	Nip Jun's deceased wife. Nip Man-Wah's mother.
