= The Fortune Buddies =

2011 Hong Kong film by Chung Shu-kai

- Traditional Chinese: 勁抽福祿壽
- Simplified Chinese: 劲抽福禄寿
- Hanyu Pinyin: Jìng Chōu Fú Lù Shòu
- Jyutping: Ging6 Cau1 Fuk1 Luk6 Sau6
- Directed by: Chung Shu Kai
- Written by: Wong Yeung Tat
- Produced by: Eric Tsang; Tommy Leung
- Starring: Eric Tsang; Louis Yuen; Wong Cho-lam; Johnson Lee; Fiona Sit; Maggie Cheung; Fala Chen; Pauline Wong; Michael Tse
- Production companies: Shaw Brothers Studio; Television Broadcasts Limited; Sil-Metropole Organisation; Sun Wah Media Group
- Distributed by: Intercontinental Film Distributors
- Release date: 11 August 2011
- Running time: 92 minutes
- Country: Hong Kong
- Language: Cantonese

The Fortune Buddies is a 2011 Hong Kong comedy film directed by Chung Shu Kai, produced by and starring Eric Tsang. Co-stars include Louis Yuen, Wong Cho-lam and Johnson Lee who are known as "Fuk Luk Sau" (福祿壽), Maggie Cheung, Fala Chen and Pauline Wong, who had been in retirement for years. The film featured many guest stars including Michael Tse, Bosco Wong and Richard Ng. It was a co-production between Shaw Brothers Studio, Television Broadcasts Limited and Sil-Metropole Organisation. A production start ceremony was held on 17 June 2011 at the Kowloonbay International Trade & Exhibition Centre. The film was released on 11 August 2011.

== Cast ==
Cast	Role	Description
Eric Tsang		Hoi Kei's father
Fiona Sit	Hoi Kei (Fiona) 薛琪	Real estate broker Eric Tsang and Pauline Wong's daughter Wong Luk Lam's girlfriend Mak Ling Ling's subordinate
Louis Yuen	Yuen Fuk Cheung 阮福祥	Wong Luk Lam and Lee Chit Sau's friend Sister Man's ex-husband Cheung Chai's father
Wong Cho-lam	Wong Luk Lam (Blue) 王祿藍	Hoi Kei's boyfriend Yuen Fuk Cheung and Lee Chit Sau's friend
Johnson Lee	Lee Chit Sau 李捷壽	Yuen Cheung Fuk and Wong Luk Lam's friend Chi King Hap's boyfriend
Maggie Cheung	Maggie	Eric Tsang's ex-girlfriend WWV International Wrestling Organization representative
Fala Chen	Sister Man 蚊姐	Yuen Fuk Cheung's ex-wife Cheung Chai's mother
Pauline Wong		Hoi Kei's mother
Michael Tse	Brother Wah 華哥	Famous actor Once filmed Turning Point
Bosco Wong	Ben	
Richard Ng		Lee Chit Sau's father
Kristal Tin		Portland Street Film Queen
Mak Ling Ling		Hoi Kei's superior
Michelle Lo		Kee Wah Bakery clerk
Lam Suet		
King Kong		Japanese general
Tin Kai-Man		Labor Department chairman
Susan Tse		
Henry Lo		
Bob Lam		
Oscar Leung		Labor Department job seeker
Macy Chan		Maggie's assistant
Sire Ma		Labor Department worker
Joe Yau		Brother Wah's assistant
Hoi Sang Lee		Kung Fu Expert
Samantha Ko	Chi King Hap 紫荊俠	Lee Chit Sau's girlfriend
Auston Lam		
Oil Chan		
Tina Shek		
Evergreen Mak		
