= Wars of In-Laws II =

- Official poster
- 野蠻奶奶大戰戈師奶
- Genre: Modern Comedy
- Starring: Liza Wang; Myolie Wu; Bosco Wong; Benz Hui; Joyce Tang; Derek Kwok
- Opening theme: "再見" by Liza Wang & FAMA
- Ending theme: "感激遇到你" by Bosco Wong & Myolie Wu "最難過今天"; Myolie Wu & Vincent Wong
- Country of origin: Hong Kong
- Original language: Cantonese
- No. of episodes: 20

Production
- Running time: 45 minutes (approx.)

Original release
- Network: TVB
- Release: January 1 – January 27, 2008

Related
- Wars of In-Laws (2005)

Wars of In-Laws II (Traditional Chinese: 野蠻奶奶大戰戈師奶) is a TVB modern comedy series released overseas in December 2007 and broadcast in January 2008. It stars Liza Wang, Myolie Wu & Bosco Wong.

The series is an indirect sequel to 2005's Wars of In-Laws (我的野蠻奶奶). The main cast features Liza Wang, Myolie Wu and Bosco Wong from the original series and new cast including Benz Hui, Joyce Tang, and Derek Kok. The indirect sequel takes place in the modern era instead of the ancient setting of its prequel.

== Synopsis ==
Magazine editor-in-chief Gwo Bik/Ophelia (Liza Wang) will never save face for her superiors, nor will she come to the defense of her subordinates. She shows no mercy to her enemies and does everything she can to keep her son Gwo Dak/Kyle (Bosco Wong) under her thumb. She is an iron lady who can't afford to lose anything. As she is still full of confidence that she can determine her son's future life, even when a plain, geeky-looking girl named Chow Lai-Man (Myolie Wu) has already managed to become the wife of Kyle. Ophelia will do anything to not face embarrassment by changing her daughter in law looks.

Not long after, Bik is dragged into a scandal and gets framed by her assistant Ko Ga-Bo/Coco (Joyce Tang), which causes her to lose her place all of a sudden. Facing a dramatic career slump and her deteriorating relationship with her son and daughter-in-law, Bik moves to the outlying islands on her own. There she meets a new man in her life, the knowledgeable and talented Pat Ping-Fan (Benz Hui) who was once a convict. From Fan, Bik has learnt how to reflect on herself and let go of the past. As everything seems to be going fine, Man discovers that there is a conspiracy going on and that the magazine she is working for is in danger of falling apart. She also discover that her family is going down too when an old friend/ex-girlfriend of Kyle, Athena, comes in and takes Kyle away from Man. Will Man be able to save the magazine company, Elva, and her family from falling apart?

== Cast ==
Cast	Role	Description
Liza Wang	Gwo Bik (Ophelia or Oh Jie or Sis O) 戈碧	Yoyo Chen (陳自瑤) as the young (cameo); Elva Magazine Chief Editor; Kyle's mother Pat Ping-Fan's enemy Fiona
Bosco Wong	Gwo Dak (Kyle) 戈德	ex-Elva Magazine Advertising Director; HK Stock Exchange Group employee Ophelia's son Chow Lai-Man's husband.
Myolie Wu	Chow Lai-Man (Ah Mun) 周麗敏	Ex-Police WPC66350; Elva Magazine ex-Chief Editor's Second Assistant "Elva Magazine" Chief Editor (Short period); Kyle's wife Ophelia's Daughter in law.
Benz Hui	Pat Ping-Fan 畢平凡	Ex-Convict (jailed for 27 years); Goh Bik's enemy later Gwo Bik friend.
Joyce Tang	Ko Ka-Bo (CoCo) 高家寶	Elva Magazine Chief Editor's First Assistant; Loves CC, later CC's wife Gwo Bik took care of her when she was young
Derek Kok	Wong Chung-Cheung (CC Wong) 王仲祥	Elva Magazine Art Director; First Coco's enemy but later husband. Has twin daughters from a previous marriage.
Nancy Wu	Li Dak-Jin (Iris) 李德瑾	Elva Magazine Beauty/Fashion Editor; Ching Chi-Sheung's girlfriend.
Stephen Huynh	Ching Chi-Sheung (Ryan) 程志尚	Elva Magazine Photographer; Li Dak-Jin's boyfriend.
Patrick Tang (鄧健泓)	Lau Ching-Shan 劉青山	Elva Magazine Clerk
Vivien Yeo	Sung Tsz-Kiu (Athena) 宋芷喬	Manager; Goh Dak's ex-girlfriend, still loves Goh Dak; Later Mark's financial adviser
Vincent Wong (王浩信)	Mark	ex-Elva Green Magazine Chief Editor; Corporation's owner's son.
Michael Miu	Himself	Cameo

== Puns ==
The name in the title "戈師奶" (Jyutping: gwo1 si1 naai5) is a pun on "哥斯拉" (Jyutping: go1 si1 laai5), which is Godzilla as translated by Hong Kong's movie industry. The names of "戈碧" and "戈德" also closely resemble the transliterations for "Gobi" and "Goethe" respectively. Those names would become identical in pronunciation to the terms they are referencing if pronounced with "lazy sounds" common in Hong Kong Cantonese.

Benz Hui's character "畢平凡" (Jyutping: bat1 ping4 fann4) used the pen name of "畢留名" (Jyutping: bat1 lau1 ming4) in magazine articles. The identically-sounding name "不留名" (translation: anonymous) is Bosco Wong's alter ego character in the original Wars of In-Laws series. 畢平凡 is also a homophone to 不平凡, which means "extraordinary".

== Viewership ratings ==
	Week	Episode	Average Points	Peaking Points	References
1	January 1–4, 2008	1 — 4	33	36	
2	January 7–11, 2008	5 — 9	33	36	
3	January 14–17, 2008	10 — 13	32	35	
4	January 21–25, 2008	14 — 18	32	35	
5	January 27, 2008	19 — 20	37	41	

== Awards and nominations ==
41st TVB Anniversary Awards (2008)

- "Best Drama"
- "Best Actress in a Leading Role" (Liza Wang - Ophelia Gwo Bik)
- "Best Actor in a Supporting Role" (Derek Kok - CC Wong Chung Cheung)
- "Best Actress in a Supporting Role" (Joyce Tang - CoCo Ko Ka-Bo)
- "My Favourite Male Character" (Bosco Wong - Kyle Gwo Dak)
- "My Favourite Female Character" (Liza Wang - Ophelia Gwo Bik)
- "My Favourite Female Character" (Myolie Wu - Chow Lai-Man)
