= White War (TV series) =

- 戰毒
- Genre: Action crime; Police procedural
- Directed by: Chan Kwok Wah
- Starring: Bosco Wong; Ron Ng; Kenny Kwan; Chrissie Chau; Yazhuo Zhang; Karena Ng
- Country of origin: China
- Original languages: Mandarin; Cantonese
- No. of episodes: 30

Production
- Producer: Lam Kwok Wah
- Production locations: Hong Kong; Thailand
- Production companies: Ledo Entertainment; Universe Entertainment; Sublime Pictures

Original release
- Release: 9 July 2020

White War (Chinese: 戰毒) is a 2020 action crime drama web television series produced by Lam Kwok Wah. The series stars Bosco Wong, Ron Ng, Kenny Kwan, Yazhuo Zhang, Chrissie Chau, and Karena Ng. It follows the story of three Hong Kong narcotics police officers.

Distributed by Tencent Penguin Pictures and Ledo Entertainment, the series premiered on 9 July 2020 on Tencent Video, Youku, iQiyi, and Viu. Production began April 2019 and concluded in July, with locations in Hong Kong and Thailand.

== Synopsis ==
Cheng Tian (Ron Ng), Wei Jun Xuan (Bosco Wong), and Xu Xiu Ping (Kenny Kwan) grew up like brothers, and the three loyal friends join the HK Police Force together, specializing in anti-narcotics cases. While they were meant to reunite after busting a large-scale drug ring, Cheng Tian and Xiu Ping discover that Jun Xuan, who had gone undercover, has returned a changed person. Xiu Ping gets framed by a gang, pushing him to join hands with the corrupted Jun Xuan out of resentment. The drug war in South East Asia intensifies as a new generation of drug lords gain power and Jun Xuan clashes with Thai drug lords. The three friends find themselves in two different worlds and their brotherhood is put to test in the face of greed and corruption.

== Cast ==
=== Main ===
- Bosco Wong as Wei Jun Xian (Turbo)
- Ron Ng as Ching Tian
- Kenny Kwan as Xu Xiu Ping
- Yazhuo Zhang as Wu Jiawen (Carmen)
- Karena Ng as Zhao Ying Ying

=== Recurring ===
- Evergreen Mak as Ku Wai Chung
- Peter Pang as He Zong Tai
- Cheng Shu Fung as Zhao Guo Ji
- Leonon as Wen Long
- Chrissie Chau as Wang Zhiqi
- Vincent Lam as Mo Yao Qiang
- Sheldon Lo as Huo Ji
- Kui Ma as Teddy
- Chun Kit Chang as Tung

==== Special guest star ====
- Gallen Lo as Chen Jian

=== Other ===
- Jacquelin Ch'ng as Miss Ma
- Q Bobo as Cai Yi Bo
- Law Lan as mother of He Zong Tai
- Alan Wan as Mr. Chan
- Harriet Yeung as Zhen
- Heidi Lee as Coco
- Shing Mak
- Karen Lee as Tina
- Rosanne Lui as mother of Xiu Ping
- Willie Lau as father of Xiu Ping
- Lam Chi Pok as Xiu Ping's brother
