= Moonlight Resonance =

- Official poster
- Also known as: Heart of Greed 2
- 溏心風暴之家好月圓
- Genre: Modern Drama (Grand Production)
- Created by: Lau Kar Ho
- Written by: Cheung Wah-biu; Sit Ga-wah
- Starring: Louise Lee; Ha Yu; Michelle Yim; Susanna Kwan; Moses Chan; Raymond Lam; Linda Chung; Tavia Yeung; Lee Heung Kam; Bosco Wong; Kate Tsui; Fala Chen; Wayne Lai; Louis Yuen; Chris Lai
- Opening theme: Wu Xin Hai Ni (無心害你) by Susanna Kwan
- Ending theme: Ai Bu Jiu (愛不疚) by Raymond Lam
- Country of origin: Hong Kong
- Original languages: Cantonese; Mandarin
- No. of episodes: 40 (list of episodes)

Production
- Running time: 45 minutes per episode
- Production company: Television Broadcasts Limited

Original release
- Network: TVB Jade
- Release: 28 July – 21 September 2008

Related
- Heart of Greed (2007); Heart and Greed (2017)

Moonlight Resonance (Traditional Chinese: 溏心風暴之家好月圓) is a 2008 grand production HDTV drama by TVB. It is a spiritual sequel to 2007's award-winning series, Heart of Greed featuring most of the original cast members. The series is written and edited by Cheung Wah-biu and Sit Ga-wah. Sponsored by Kee Wah Bakery, the series began broadcast on 28 July 2008. It stars Louise Lee, Ha Yu, Michelle Yim, Susanna Kwan, Moses Chan, Raymond Lam and Linda Chung. Its final episode was one of the highest rated TVB episodes in the 2000s decade at 50 points. The series was met with critical acclaim, with praise to the intense plot, excellent performances by the cast, and moving storyline. It went on to receive various awards and is one of the highest-rated TVB series in viewership in the 2000s.

== Plot ==
Chung Siu-Hor discovers her husband Gan Tai-Cho's affair with their employee Yan-Hung, leading to their divorce. Yan-Hung and Tai-Cho take over the successful Moonlight Bakery, while Siu-Hor struggles with her own bakery. Yan-Hung manipulates the family for years, causing strife.

After a miscarriage, Yan-Hung blames Wing-Yuen, manipulating him further. Siu-Hor's sister, Siu-Sa, attempts to sue for the bakery's name but loses. Wing-Ka overcomes his stock market addiction and falls for his cousin Ka Mei.

So-Sum abandons her feelings for Wing-Ho for Dr. Ling Chi Shun, who is already in a relationship. Despite complications, So-Sum and Wing-Ho eventually reunite. Ka Mei's relationship with Wing-Yuen ends when she has an abortion due to uncertainty about the baby's paternity.

Wing-Ho encourages So-Sum to find a job, leading to her meeting Kelvin, who they eventually marry despite initial opposition from his mother. Wing-Chung, sent to England as a child, dislikes school and is allowed to drop out by Siu-Hor.

Yan-Hung's jealousy leads her to legal action, attempting to seize 90% of the family assets. She murders Gwan-Lai to prevent evidence gathering but is eventually exposed by Ka Mei for the murder. Yan-Hung is convicted and sentenced, with Tai-Cho promising her shares upon her release.

In the end, Yan-Hung, living in New Zealand, refuses her shares and approves of So-Sum and Wing-Ho's relationship, while Wing Ka and Hou Yuet are happily married.

== Production ==
=== Development ===
TVB's 2007 series, Heart of Greed, was successful enough to commission this series. In June 2007, Louise Lee presented on the Heart of Greed (溏心) chatroom that the producers had already begun to write another series with the same actors but a different story line. Details about the new series were leaked by the media in October 2007 and Lau Kar Ho, the director, writer and producer of the series, vowed to catch the person who leaked this information because few people knew about the new series. The sales presentation clip was released on 19 November 2007. The clip gave clues about the new series which featured Michelle Yim as the new villain and a mooncake business instead of the abalone business in Heart of Greed. New cast members included Kate Tsui, Lee Heung Kam, Vincent Wan and Wayne Lai.

On 28 January 2008, the cast celebrated their kick-off in filming, which included a costume fitting. Lee, Raymond Lam and Fala Chen had to attend baking lessons in order for them to film baking scenes realistically. Filming commenced on 14 February 2008, where Lee, Lai and Lam were the first to shoot at a bakery. The main cast and Lau Kar Ho celebrated the blessing ceremony of the series on 7 March 2008. The release of its official trailer was aired at the Shanghai Television Festival on 11 June. Principal filming ended on 1 July 2008, and its official English title was revealed. TVB officially began promotional and advertising work on the series on 5 July 2008, with an advertisement being aired followed up with its official website being released on 8 July 2008.

=== Music ===
The opening theme song for the series Mo Sam Hoi Ni (無心害你) was performed by Susanna Kwan, while the ending song Ai Bu Kau (愛不疚) was performed by Raymond Lam and was featured in his album Your Love. The ending theme was nominated as one of the top-10 song of the 31st RTHK Top 10 Gold Songs Awards. A featured song for the series entitled "Ice Cream (Talk to Me)" was written and produced by London-based production team DNR DNR who are better known as The Slips.

=== Casting dilemma ===
Wayne Lai was originally cast as the character who would eventually become the husband for Susanna Kwan's character. However, Lai explained on the celebrity talk show Be My Guest that due to health problems, the role was offered to Louis Yuen instead. Lai took over the part of the baker Nin Tze Yung, which Yuen was originally assigned to.

== Cast ==
=== Chung Household ===
Cast	Role	Nicknames	Description	Age
Chow Chung	Chung Fan Tat 鍾泛達	Uncle Tat (達叔), Grandpa (公公)	Father of Chung Siu Hor; Foster father of Chung Siu Sa	80
Shirley Yeung	Chung Siu Hor 鍾笑荷	MaMa Hor (荷媽), Fei Yeh (肥嘢), Sister Hor (荷姐)	Mother of Kam Wing Ka, Kam Wing Ho, Kam Wing Yuen, Kam Wing Hing, Kam Wing Chung, adopted mother of Suen Ho Yuet, stepmother to Yue So Sum	53
Louise Lee	Chung Siu Hor 鍾笑荷	MaMa Hor (荷媽), Fei Yeh (肥嘢), Sister Hor (荷姐)	Mother of Kam Wing Ka, Kam Wing Ho, Kam Wing Yuen, Kam Wing Hing, Kam Wing Chung, adopted mother of Suen Ho Yuet, stepmother to Yue So Sum	53
Susanna Kwan	Chung Siu Sa 鍾笑莎	Auntie Sa (Sa姨), Ah Sa (阿Sa), Lor Por (攞婆), SaSa, Salina	Mother of Lo Ka Mei; Wife of Yuen Yan Tsz	45
Louis Yuen	Yuen Yan Tsz 袁恩賜	Yan Tsz (恩賜), PaPa	Husband of Chung Siu Sa	40
Raymond Lam	Kam Wing Ho 甘永好	Steward Boy (管家仔), Ah Ho (阿好), Cake Selling Boy (賣餅仔), Sat Ah Yan (撒亞人), Beng Sui (餅碎)	Husband of Yue So Sum; Ex-boyfriend Fong Shu Ting	26
Tavia Yeung	Suen Ho Yuet 孫皓月	Ah Yuet (阿月), Lor Lui (攞女/裸女), Quota	Wife of Kam Wing Ka; Adopted daughter of Chung Siu Hor	24
Fala Chen	Kam Wing Hing 甘永慶	Ah Hing (阿慶), Mute Girl (啞女), Ah Wing (阿 Wing)	Wife of Cheng Ka Lok	21
Dexter Young	Cheng Ka Lok 鄭家樂	Ah Lok (阿樂), Ka Lok (家樂), Kelvin	Husband of Kam Wing Hing	
Kate Tsui	Lo Ka Mei 路嘉美	Ka Mei (嘉美), Tong Shan Tai Hing (唐山大兄), Camie	Wife of Kam Wing Yuen; Ex-girlfriend of Kam Wing Ka	22
Mary Hon	Kuen 娟	鄭太太，親家	Mother of Cheng Ka Lok; Mother-in-law of Kam Wing Hing	
Lily Leung	Old Mrs Yuen 袁老太	No nickname specified	Mother of Yuen Yan Tsz; Mother-in-law of Chung Siu Sa	

=== Kam Household ===
Cast	Role	Nicknames	Description	Age
Lee Heung-kam	Sheh Kwan Lai 佘君麗	Lai Lai (奶奶), Grandmother (嫲嫲), Old Mrs Kam (甘老太), Sheh Tai Kwan (佘太君)	Mother of Kam Tai Cho, Kam Tai Chuen; Mother-in-law of Yan Hung	76
Jack Wu	Kam Tai Cho 甘泰祖	Papa Cho (Jo飽), Ah Cho (阿祖)	Father of Kam Wing Ka, Kam Wing Ho, Kam Wing Yuen, Kam Wing Hing, Kam Wing Chung, stepfather to Yue So Sum, adopted father of Suen Ho Yuet	57
Ha Yu	Kam Tai Cho 甘泰祖	Papa Cho (Jo飽), Ah Cho (阿祖)	Father of Kam Wing Ka, Kam Wing Ho, Kam Wing Yuen, Kam Wing Hing, Kam Wing Chung, stepfather to Yue So Sum, adopted father of Suen Ho Yuet	57
Michelle Yim	Yan Hung 殷紅	Sister Hung (紅姐), Auntie Hung (紅姨), Ah Hung (阿紅), Wu Lei Jing (狐狸精), Iron Hung (鐵人紅)	Ex-Wife of Kam Tai Cho (Main villain)	46
Moses Chan	Kam Wing Ka 甘永家	Ja Gu (揸沽), Ah Ka (阿卡), Kam Jung (甘總)	Husband of Suen Ho Yuet; Ex-boyfriend of Lo Ka Mei	28
Chris Lai	Kam Wing Yuen 甘永圓	Ah Yuen (阿圓)	Husband of Lo Ka Mei	22
Vincent Wan	Kam Wing Chung 甘永中	Chung Jai (中仔), Boon Mun Mang (半文盲)		20
Linda Chung	Yue So Sum 于素心	Yue So Tsau (于素秋), Cindy, Sum Nui (心女), Princess Athena (雅典娜公主), Steward Woman (管家婆), Ah Tsau (阿秋)	Wife of Kam Wing Ho; Ex Girlfriend of Ling Chi-Shun	25
Alice Fung So-bor	Sheh Lai Mui 佘麗梅	Ah Mui (阿梅)	Younger sister of Sheh Kwan Lai	
Lee Shing-cheong	Mak Yau Kung 麥友恭	Biu Suk Kung (表叔恭) Ah Kung (阿恭)	Son of Sheh Lai Mui (Semi-villain)	
Man Yeung Ching Wah	Kam Tai Chuen 甘泰全	No nickname specified	Son of Sheh Kwan Lai	
Liu Lai Lai	Mrs. Bik 碧姐	No nickname specified		
Lee Kong Lung	Kuen 權	No nickname specified		

=== Others ===
Cast	Role	Nicknames	Description	Age
Bosco Wong	Ling Chi-Shun 凌至信	Ah Shun (阿信), Ling-B (凌B), Gor Gor (哥哥), Dr. Ling	Ex Boyfriend of Yue So Sum, Boyfriend of Yau Wing Lam	27
Wayne Lai	Nin Tsz Yung 年子勇	Lin Chi Yung (蓮子容)	Worked for Mama Hor, but later left to live with his sister.	43
Zhong Xin Ling	Yau Wing Lam 邱詠琳	Wing Lam (詠琳)	Girlfriend of Ling Chi Shun	
Tracy Ip	Fong Shu Ting 方舒婷	Ting-Ting (婷婷)	Ex-girlfriend of Kam Wing Ho	
Carrie Lam	Fong Shu Wing 方舒詠	No nickname specified		
Angelina Lo	Mrs Fong	No nickname specified	Mother of Fong Shu Ting, Fong Shu Wing	
Lam Suet	Yue Hak Keung 于克強	Ah Keung (阿強), Oiled Face Keung (面油強)	(semi-villain)	
Johnny Tang	Cheung Chi Yin 張至賢	No nickname specified	Ex-boyfriend of Suen Ho Yuet	
Ellesmere Choi	Wong Hiu Lung 黃曉龍	No nickname specified		

== Characters ==
=== The Elders ===
- Gan Tai Cho - Tai Cho is a loving and witty man. In 1996, he was tricked by his employee Yan Hung into having an affair with her, which causes his and Siu Hor's happy marriage to abruptly end. Although for 10 years he did not really care about Hor, he is always worried about his children and tries his best to spend time with them. During the series, Cho admits his mistakes, asks all the children for their forgiveness, and tries to make it up to Hor. Soon, Cho and Hor go through a lot together and memories of their past together resurface. After many long years, Cho finally gets the confidence to stand up to Hung, and during the two-hour finale, he officially reunites with Hor.
- Chung Siu Hor - Hor is an honest, kind, independent and loving woman. Although very uncompassionate to Hung, Hor is very loving to Cho, even after he had an affair, stole the bakery name, and forcefully took three of the children. In the beginning of the series, we see Hor and her children struggling to maintain the bakery, getting by with just enough to spare. Although Hor spends much time managing the bakery, she also puts a great deal of time into raising her children and caring for her father. She is very admired by her children, including the children who followed Cho. She is very happy when Cho finally admits his mistakes and happily agrees to remarry him when he gets a chance.
- Yan Hung - Hung is a petty, greedy, cunning, and dishonest woman. She started out as a young worker from the countryside with no knowledge of urban technology (like the telephone). Eventually she found her way to the Moonlight Bakery and found work there as a dish washer. As time passed, Hung became better educated and became one of Moonlight Bakery's most talented and well-loved employees. It was Hung who started the affair with Cho and caused the Kam household to split up. Once Cho and Hor are divorced, Hong deliberately manipulated the family by fueling arguments between the two sides. She also steals the Moonlight Bakery trademark, and with Cho, expands the bakery throughout Hong Kong, making over one billion Hong Kong dollars. After Cho and Hor patch things up with each other and Jo gets back in touch with his children, Hong continually tries to keep him away from Hor's family. Hong even kills her mother in law when she tries to reveal all the bad things Hung has done. Eventually Hung is arrested and sent to jail for manslaughter. Yu So Sum, more commonly known as Yu So Tsau, is Hung's daughter from her first husband.
- Salina Chung Siu Sa - Sa is Hor's younger sister. In the beginning and middle of the series she is a caring but mean and greedy woman who was abandoned by her husband in Portugal and had no choice but to return to Hong Kong. Sa resembles her sister in some ways, but not in others. Like Hor, she is smart, caring, and straightforward, but unlike her, she is mean, unwilling to just forget, talks too much, and will do anything for money. Towards the middle of the series everyone discovers that she is adopted and she gets kicked out of the house having become tired of her trouble-making and greediness. This experience changes her life, and she realizes how awful she had been to people. She begs for forgiveness and is let back into the family. Sa becomes very defensive of her sister and cares about her a lot. Sa marries Yuen Yan Chi during the series. Lo Ka Mei (Camie) is Sa's adopted daughter (revealed via webcam). Many people skip the webcam episode and conclude that she and Camie are blood-related.
- Sheh Gwan Lai - She is Cho's mother. Gwan Lai is an old, loving grandmother who cares very deeply for her son and all her grandchildren, especially Ah Ho, who is her favourite grandchild. Even though she can get very grumpy sometimes, her grandchildren still love her because they understand that she's old and cannot get out her emotions any other way when she feels bad. Willing to use her life to save Cho's or her grandchildren's lives. Grandma refuses to eat, drink or take her medicine multiple times during the series when they persist in doing things she does not approve of. She starts out in the series hating Hor to the gut, but as Hung's evil schemes are slowly revealed, Grandma learns to admit her misunderstandings and her relationship with Hor improves. When Hung gives up on Cho and creates a secret scheme to steal profits from the company, grandma finds out and reveals it to Cho, Hor, and the children. Near the end of the series, when she prepares evidence against Hung for the court case, Hung pushes grandma down the stairs and she was subsequently killed.
- Chung Fan Dat - Grandpa is Hor's father. An old grandfather who, like Grandma, cares very much about his daughter and grandchildren. He has always been there when Hor or her children need him the most. He resembles Grandma in the sense that they both will do anything for their children or grandchildren. It was Grandpa who came up with the name "Moonlight Bakery"("Ka Ho Yuet Yuen"). When the two families entangled in the shop brand name lawsuit, Grandpa gathers all his friends, the bakery employees, Hor's friends, and all the grandchildren who followed Hor to sue Cho and Hung. Cho and Hung win the case and keep the name 'Moonlight Bakery". Eventually he learns to accept back Cho when he admits his mistakes and turns himself around.
- Sheh Lai Mui and Mak Yau Gung - Mui is Grandma's twin sister and resembles her caring, firm ways. Gung is Sheh's son and a total opposite to her. Both are blackmailed by Hung to work for her due to their constant insecure status in the family. Eventually both free themselves and Gung opens his own small business.
- Yuen Yan Chi - Yan Chi is Siu Sa's second husband. He first met her at a dance in Fontainhas was office manager at Ga Mei's dancing school and also her private dance teacher. Although he is ten years younger than Sa, they still married because they were in love and Yan Chi cared about Ka Mei. Educated, funny and caring, he is at first well liked by the family. During the big court case, they almost get divorced because he says in court that Jo and Hor were likely having an affair, but when Sa goes to the hospital and throws the wedding ring at him when he comes to see her, he repents and is punished by having to find her ring. For the rest of the series they are on good terms and everything is well.

=== The Children ===
- Gam Wing Ka - Ka is Cho and Hor's eldest son and the oldest of the children. When Cho and Hor split up the children, Hor begged Ka to look after the children who went with Cho and make sure they did not turn bad. Sadly, Hung's evil ways made this impossible. In the beginning of the series, Ka is very addicted to the stock market and gambling; it was Hung who bribed Hor's good friend Lin Chi Yung into getting Ka into it. However, with the help of Hor and his adoptive sister Suen Hou Yuet, Ka learns to resist and end his addiction. Throughout much of the series, Ka has an affair with his boss Eliza, whom he always bothers in a flirty way. Ka resembles Cho and Hor the sense that they all care a lot about the family. Later it is revealed that Ka has a heart problem and the chance of him living past age 35 is low. Soon after he falls in love with Hou Yuet, and soon she develops feelings for him, too. Years later, it is revealed that Ka, now in his late thirties, will survive, has married Yuet, and has had two children by her.
- Gam Wing Ho - Ho is Cho and Hor's second son. After the divorce he fell under the custody of his mother, Hor, and along with his sisters Yuet and Hing, helps his mother at the bakery. Ho takes up the role of a father as well as an elder son in the Chung household and resembles Hor in almost every way. Since childhood, he had been entangled in a love relationship with Hung's daughter Yu So Sum. After the divorce, they continued to date each other, often by going on the ferry, until Hung forced Sum to study in England, when Ho and Sum were forced to break up. Ten years later, they got back together, although they were just in a brother-sister relationship. At the end of the series, Ho and Sum officially get back together, fall in love, and get married.
- Suen Hou Yuet - Yuet is Cho and Hor's adopted daughter. Yuet is the daughter of one of Cho and Hor's close neighborhood family friends, but was abandoned by her single mother at the age of 2. Feeling sorry for her, and sensing he knew the reason her mother was forced to abandon her daughter, Grandpa took Yuet in. Cho and Hor, knowing the mother and daughter well, decided to adopt her. Yuet is a very bright, straightforward, and independent girl who left her family two times to live on her own throughout the series. During most of the beginning of the series, Yuet was constantly taunted (later teased) by Sa, who called her "Lor Mui" (Adopted Girl). Yuet is very close to Ka. It was mostly her efforts that helped Ka to stop gambling and investing because she bit him on the arm. At the end of the series she marries Ka and has two children with him.
- Gam Wing Yuen - Yuen is an innocent, smart, forgiving figure. When Cho and Hor divorced, Yuen followed Cho. As a child he continuously sneaked back to Hor by himself, every time only to be sent back by Hor. He excels to become a successful person who has studied abroad and holds an advanced degree in business. He is blackmailed by Hung to help her because she lied that he caused her to miscarriage and she also made Yuen look like he bribed police officers to release him when he took drugs, was drunk and while driving in such a state, ran over a woman. Towards the middle of the series Yuen is made GM of Moonlight Resonance Bakery. Later in the series Hung recruits Ka Mei as Yuen's personal assistant, and eventually they fall in love and get married. Towards the end of the series Cho releases Yuen from Hung's control by revealing what Yuen did, and explaining how Hung committed crimes by blackmailing him. During the court trial in which Hung tries to take over Moonlight Resonance Bakery, Yuen and Ka Mei get into arguments and separate for a while. The series ends with Yuen and Ka Mei getting back together when she reveals the truth behind their Grandma's death.
- Gam Wing Hing - Hing is Cho and Hor's daughter. She is famous in the series for her role as the "Mute Girl". Physically unable to speak, she talks to her family and co-workers using sign language. Very loving and devoted to her family, she gave up her chance to go to college so that she could stay and work with Hor at the bakery. However, as she really did not like working at the bakery, she managed to get a job as a secretary, which Ho helped translate for her during the job interview. With her charming personality and hard working character, Hing soon earned the friendship and respect of everyone around her, especially Cheng Ga Lok, who became her boyfriend and eventually her husband. She and Ga Lok have a child at the end of the show.
- Gam Wing Chung - Hor and Cho's youngest son. When he was only 9, he was taken to Manchester to boarding school just to keep Hung's daughter, Yu So Sum, company. He was spoiled by Hung and was given a house near Chinatown, two BMWs and a Mercedes Benz. He soon ran away from school and left Manchester to go back to Hor because his grades were bad, even admitting himself that he lacks sufficient ability to learn, but was still forced to study by Hung. Hor encouraged Chung to work hard on his talents, rowing and computer programming. He soon got used to his siblings which he missed since childhood. Chung is known as the "Illiterate Boy". Since he was sent to England when he was only 9, he had no chance to learn Chinese. In England, Hung just dumped him in Chinatown with the other British Chinese boys, so he did not learn sufficient English, either. After returning to Hong Kong, his siblings encouraged him and he quickly picked up both languages perfectly. At the end of the series, he became the bakery's administration department computer programmer/IT specialist.
- Yu So Sum (Yu So Tsau) - Tsau is Hung's daughter from her first husband. Tsau is a very peaceful, elegant, filial, and smart girl who has emerged from being the daughter of country chicken farmers to a doctor who has studied in England and lives and works in Hong Kong. As Hung was very close to Cho and Hor when they were still married, Cho and Hor took Tsau (with Hung's permission) as their goddaughter and because of this Tsau virtually grew up with the kids; her nickname "Tsau" comes from Grandpa's wish for seven grandchildren, each with names from part of the phrase "家好月圓慶中秋 Ga Ho Yuet Yuen, Hing Chung Tsau". At a young age she fell in love with Ho and for years dated him on the ferry. After the divorce, Tsau continued dating until Hung sent her to England to study when Tsau and Ho were forced to break up. After she returned, she reunited with Ho but they did not start dating again, instead they just had a sworn brother-sister relationship. As she is the daughter of Yan Hung, she always get stuck between 2 families. She helped Hor's family a few times when her mother frames them for something they did not do. Finally feeling her and her mother owes Jo and Hor too much, at the last episode, she transfers her 70% of shares her mother had given her. In the series, she continually goes back and forth between Ho and Ling, always turning to Ho whenever she is feeling down. At the end of the series Tsau finally gets out of the love web and gets back together with Ho.
- Camie Lo Ka Mei - Camie is Sa's adopted daughter (revealed via webcam) from Portugal. Her character is almost an exact copy of her mother's. She appears in the middle of the series as a beautiful, womanly 23-year-old girl who has just graduated from college and secretly has a child back in Portugal called Ronald. It turns out that she is a greedy, sneaky and selfish figure. She got this from her mother who was also greedy selfish and sneaky but her mother had learned from her mistakes after she found out that she was not blood related to her father and sister. Camie has a long love affair with Ka and once she's done with him, she has another one with Yuen. The affair ends with Camie being pregnant and forced to marry Yuen even though the baby was not his. She later has an abortion because the real father of the baby kept blackmailing her to give him money. Camie is constantly manipulated by Hung to work for her, but with her mother's constant scolding as well as subsequently saving her from a speeding van and the constant evils she sees Hung committing. During a press conference held by Hung, she betrayed Hong by revealing that Hung killed Grandma by pushing her down the stairs. In the end, she lives happily with the rest of the family and Yuen.

=== Others ===
- Ling Chi Shun - Chi-Shun is a doctor who works with Chau at the hospital. A very cheerful, jovial man, he constantly cares for the babies he delivers and tells jokes. He strives to succeed for two people: his father, who worked very hard selling ice cream to pay for Ling Chi Sun's studies in England, and his girlfriend Wing Lam, who got him back on track and worked off his debts when he got addicted to Gambling and wasted a lot of his college money. He first meets Chau when they both see a pregnant woman at the mall and help her get to the hospital and successfully deliver her son, Lap. As he and Chau got closer to each other, they fell in love and soon Chi-Shun, Chau, and Wing Lam were stuck in a love triangle, and soon Chau dragged Ho into it too. Chi Shun went back and forth between the two women before deciding to leave for England with Wing Lam. However, when Wing Lam died, he lost confidence in everything and lied to Chau, saying he had gotten married with Wing Lam and was just working at the hospital temporarily. However, Chau found out the truth that Chi Shun wanted to spend Wing Lam's final days with her and soon they started over again. At the end of the series, Chi Shun officially hands over Chau back to Ho and they remain close friends.
- Lin Chi Yung - Lin is a long-time worker at Hor's shop. Very loyal and skilled, he became Hor's apprentice when he was 13, but betrayed her when Hung bribed him to work for her with a salary so high yet so realistic so he could pay for his sister's college fees in Australia and still have enough to live off of. However, Hung finally stops using him and fires him, revealing to him her true side. Lin goes back to Hor and apologizes to her and is forgiven. Yung reveals to Grandma that her son Chuen (Jo's brother) did not die because Hor refused to help him pay off his gambling debts, but because his girlfriend had dumped him and left him with thousands of dollars of debt and he did not want to bother Hor, the only person he was grateful to, to give him more money. Eventually, Sa helps Lin Chi-Yung get a job in Australia as a branch manager for her friend's moon cake company. He is thrilled but tries to keep himself on Sa's good side (while she tries to con money from Gwan Lai), so she will not spoil his only chance to reunite with his sister, who is studying in Australia. However, when Sa revealed to Gwan Lai that Chung is staying with Hor after he ran away, and pushed the responsibility to Cho, Yung is pushed to his limits and revealed the truth, causing Sa to spoil this chance. Nonetheless, after the episode where Gwan Lai is convinced not to force Chung to stay with her, Hor forces Sa to go back on her words and return the chance to Yung. In Australia, he succeeds and becomes known as the "King of Moon Cakes". At the end of the series Yung comes back to Hong Kong for a visit. Yung's sister, Lin Tsui Ping, is a childhood playmate of Jo and Hor's children and is an apple to Hor's eye.
- Eliza - Eliza was Ka and Yuet's demanding and vicious boss-from-hell when they were working in her PR firm in the beginning of the series. She tolerated Ka's laziness and incompetence in his work because of her close relationship with Yan Hong. However, in the end she fired Ka because he kissed her in her office, giving her the impression that Ka was sexually assaulting her. She however kept Yuet at her firm. Yuet was later fired because Eliza thought that Ka and her teamed up to make her look like a fool with a ringtone that Ka made using Eliza's shrill and demanding voice. Eliza also almost ruins Ka's first promotional function by stealing away his customers and misleading his clients with fallacy.
- Yau Wing Lam - Wing Lam is Chi-Shun's girlfriend. Very loyal and worrisome about him, she stayed in England with him when he was in medical school to help him graduate when he got addicted to gambling. She even worked part-time to pay his gambling debts and the money he wasted. Once Chi-Shun graduated, Wing Lam went with him back to Hong Kong, where she worked as a saleswoman. Towards the end of the series, Wing Lam go back to England together in hopes of getting married, but Wing Lam dies of cancer before they can plan things out.
- Yu Hak Keung - Yu is Hung's ex-husband and Chau's father. He dumped Hong and Chau when Chau was only 6 years old, but returned towards the middle-end of the series to help out Hong in all her difficulties because he felt he owed her. Ever-worrisome about Chau, it is his greatest wish to see her one last time. When he heard of her relationship with Ho, at first he thought he was just playing around with her, but eventually discovered Ho was a good boy. When Yu died towards the end of the series from cancer, Chau come to see him one last time, and Yu tells her he feels content leaving her with Ho.
- Fong Shu Ting - Shu-ting is Ho's ex-girlfriend. She works as a stewardess in one of Hong Kong airline company, and she met Ho when he was flying to Thailand. Originally a happy couple, they broke up after multiple misunderstandings due to Ho's love and commitment to the family. Despite the misunderstandings, Ho and Shu-ting remain close friends and trust each other. When they have big secrets or troubling problems they would help each other. Shu-ting's elder sister is famous TV star Fong Shu-wing.
- Kelvin Cheng Ka Lok - Kelvin is Hing's boyfriend, later husband. A kind, caring man, he is the perfect partner for Hing. Kelvin fell in love with Hing only days after she started her job, and immediately started taking the bus with her to work instead of driving, staying late at night at work just to keep Hing company, and learned sign language so that he could talk with her.

== Viewership and accolades ==
The initial critical response for the series was excellent with the first episode receiving an average of 33 rating points with a peak of 42 and received peak points over 35 in later weeks. Like its predecessor, the 2-hour series finale premiered at a Hong Kong shopping centre, Discovery Park, in front of hundreds of guests and supporters. The finale was shown in the form of a variety show, 家好月圓慶團圓 and the viewership for that had reached 44 rating points. Viewership was higher than expected, with the final episode receiving an average of 47 rating points and a peak of 50 in the scene where Linda Chung and Michelle Yim's characters argued. As a result, Moonlight Resonance outperformed Heart of Greed, and is one of the highest-rated TVB series in viewership in the 2000s. Its rating tied with Dae Jang Geum, a Korean drama series that also garnered 50 points while it aired on TVB. The series received positive reviews from Hong Kong audiences but there were some who found the overall plot to be too similar to its predecessor. Moonlight Resonance was nominated for 18 TVB Anniversary Awards in 2008 and won a total of 6 awards.

Ratings for Moonlight Resonance

Week	Episode Numbers	Average Points	Peaking Points	References
1 (28 July – 1 August 2008)	1 to 5	33	37 (42)	
2 (4–8 August 2008)	6 to 9	36	41	
3 (11–15 August 2008)	10 to 12	33	34	
4 (18–22 August 2008)	13 to 17	32	37	
5 (25–29 August 2008)	18 to 22	34	37	
6 (1–5 September 2008)	23 to 27	36	38	
7 (8–12 September 2008)	28 to 32	34	36	
8 (15–19 September 2008)	33 to 37	38	39	
8 (20 September 2008)	38	34	No peak points	
8 (21 September 2008)	39 to 40	47	50	

=== List of awards and nominations ===
- TVB Anniversary Awards — Best Drama
  - Moonlight Resonance (溏心風暴之家好月圓) - Winner
- TVB Anniversary Awards — Best Actor in a Leading Role
  - Ha Yu - Winner
  - Moses Chan - Top 5
  - Raymond Lam - Top 5
- TVB Anniversary Awards — Best Actress in a Leading Role
  - Michelle Yim - Winner
  - Louise Lee - Top 5
  - Susanna Kwan - Top 10
- TVB Anniversary Awards — Best Actor in a Supporting Role
  - Chow Chung Top 5
- TVB Anniversary Awards — Best Actress in a Supporting Role
  - Tavia Yeung - Winner
  - Fala Chen - Top 5
  - Kate Tsui - Top 5
  - Lee Heung Kam - Top 5
- TVB Anniversary Awards — My Most Favourite Male Character Role
  - Raymond Lam - Winner
  - Ha Yu - Top 5
- TVB Anniversary Awards — My Most Favourite Female Character Role
  - Louise Lee - Winner
  - Susanna Kwan - Top 5
  - Fala Chen - Top 5
- TVB Anniversary Awards — Most Vastly Improved Actress
  - Tavia Yeung - Top 5
- Yahoo! Popular Searches Awards — Most Searched Television Series
  - Moonlight Resonance - Winner
- Yahoo! Popular Searches Awards — Most Popular Searched Song
  - Raymond Lam - Winner
- Yahoo! Popular Searches Awards — Most Searched Television Male Artist
  - Raymond Lam - Winner
- The Next Magazine TV Awards 2009- Next Magazine Top Ten TV Programmes
  - Moonlight Resonance (溏心風暴之家好月圓)
- The Next Magazine TV Awards 2009- Next Magazine Top Ten TV Artists
  - Raymond Lam (as Gan Wing Ho/甘永好)
- The Next Magazine TV Awards 2009- Next Magazine Top Ten TV Artists
  - Tavia Yeung (as Suen Hou Yuet/孫皓月)
- The Next Magazine TV Awards 2009- Next Magazine Top Ten TV Artists
  - Moses Chan (as Gan Wing Ga/甘永家)
- The Next Magazine TV Awards 2009- Next Magazine Top Ten TV Artists
  - Michelle Yim (as Yan Hong/殷紅)
- The Next Magazine TV Awards 2009- Next Magazine Top Ten TV Artists
  - Linda Chung (as Yu So Sum/於素心)
- The Next Magazine TV Awards 2009- Next Magazine Top Ten TV Artists
  - Ha Yu (as Gan Tai Cho/甘泰祖)
- The Next Magazine TV Awards 2009- Next Magazine Top Ten TV Artists
  - Louise Lee (as Chung Siu Ho/鍾笑荷)
- Asian Television Awards 2009- Best Drama Performance by an Actress
  - Michelle Yim (as Yan Hong/殷紅)
- Guangzhou Television Awards 2009- Best Actress in a Leading Role for a Television Drama
  - Michelle Yim (as Yan Hong/殷紅)

== Sequel ==
A sequel titled Heart and Greed was released in 2017 featuring some of the original cast members. The series was met with mostly negative reviews with audiences saying how times have changed and the type of plot being used is too similar to the first two series which has become old-fashioned after almost a decade.

== International release ==
Country of broadcast	Broadcasting network	Release date
Australia	TVBJ	4 August 2008
Europe	TVBS-E	20 August 2008
Hong Kong	TVB Jade	28 July 2008
Malaysia	Astro On Demand, 8TV, TV2	28 July 2008, 12 August 2010, 9 September 2017
Singapore	StarHub, Mediacorp Channel U	2 Oct 2008, 30 June 2011
Thailand	Channel 3 (Thailand)	27 May 2010
United States	TVB USA	11 Aug 2009
Canada	Fairchild Television	29 September 2009
Cambodia	PPCTV drama 9	2 October 2009
Indonesia	RCTI	24 September 2018
Philippines	ABS-CBN, IBC	10 December 2018, 18 March 2019

== DVD release ==
Language/s	Episodes	Discs	DVD release date
Cantonese; Mandarin	40	10	Hong Kong: 21 September 2008; Region 3
This release of Moonlight Resonance includes all 40 episodes. Special features include a character relationship, series promotions and bloopers.
