= Carrie Lam (actress) =

Hong Kong actress (born 1980)

- Chinese: 林莉
- Born: 25 March 1980 (age 46); Hong Kong

Chinese name
Transcriptions
Standard Mandarin
- Hanyu Pinyin: Lín Lì
Yue: Cantonese
- Jyutping: Lam^{4} Lei^{6}

Carrie Lam Lei (Chinese: 林莉; born 25 March 1980) is a Hong Kong television presenter and actress affiliated with TVB with family roots in Chaozhou, Guangdong. She was the second runner-up in the 2005 Miss Hong Kong pageant.

== Biography ==
=== Miss Hong Kong ===
Carrie competed in the Miss Hong Kong Pageant 2005 alongside Tracy Ip. They were in the same Top 40 group, The Modelling Group, competing to be in the top 20. In the end, Tracy won the crown while Carrie took 2nd runner-up.

=== Miss International ===
Typically, TVB sends the second runner-up of Miss Hong Kong to represent Hong Kong in the Miss International Pageant. As Carrie is the 2nd runner-up in 2005, she should have competed in Miss International 2005. However, due to the Miss International entry deadline to be before the Miss Hong Kong pageant took place, TVB opted to send Miss Hong Kong 2004 1st Runner-Up, Queenie Chu, to the pageant instead.

=== Life after the pageants ===
She signed an artist contract with TVB after her reign was over and entered the entertainment business. She hosted the TVB show E-Buzz, then left the company after her contract was over. She is now a full-time model with Starzpeople and occasionally works with TVB, hosting Money Smart and had cameo appearances in Moonlight Resonance and Gem of Life.

On December 12, 2011, she also had a cameo appearance on Episode 72 of Running Man`s Hong Kong Special, a popular South Korean variety show.

== Filmography ==
=== Series ===
- Heart of Greed as Cho Bang
- Best Selling Secrets as Catherine
- The Gem of Life as Stephy
- Moonlight Resonance as Fong Shu Wing
