= Wars of In-laws =

- 我的野蠻奶奶
- Genre: Costume Comedy
- Starring: Liza Wang; Myolie Wu; Bosco Wong; Bill Chan; Christine Ng; Gordon Liu; Suet Nei
- Opening theme: "家規" by Liza Wang, Myolie Wu, & Bosco Wong
- Country of origin: Hong Kong
- Original language: Cantonese
- No. of episodes: 20

Production
- Running time: 45 minutes (approx.)

Original release
- Network: TVB
- Release: July 18 – August 12, 2005

Related
- Wars of In-Laws II (2008)

Wars of In-Laws (Traditional Chinese: 我的野蠻奶奶) is a TVB costume comedy series broadcast in July 2005. It stars Liza Wang, Myolie Wu & Bosco Wong, Bill Chan, Christine Ng, Gordon Liu and Suet Nei.

An indirect modern sequel, Wars of In-Laws II (野蠻奶奶大戰戈師奶) was produced and broadcast in 2008 continued with Liza Wang, Myolie Wu, and Bosco Wong.

== Synopsis ==
The mother is unruly.
The wife is a shrew.
The poor son is stuck between the two.

Tin Lik (Myolie Wu) is the daughter of a bandit and she married into the Ling family by coincidence. When she was escaping from guards, she fled to the vehicle that was going to transport the bride. But the real bride had already eloped with another man. Therefore, in order to escape from the guards, Tin Lik had to be the imposter. Tin Lik's mother-in-law, Hitara (Liza Wang), is very barbaric. They always argue with each other and Tin Lik's husband, Ning Mao-Chun (Bosco Wong), always gets caught in the crossfire. He has to please his mother and wife at the same time.

Mao-Chun is a very timid guy. But no one knows that he is actually a hero that uses his martial arts to steal from corrupted officials, taking the money and giving it to the poor. He is known as the "nameless" hero. Once he appeared at a charity function to teach a corrupted official a lesson of justice, but ends up saving Tin Lik instead. From that day onwards, Tin Lik found herself falling in love with "nameless". She would later discover that "nameless" is really Mao-Chun. Tin Lik's true identity as a bandit, is also accidentally revealed to her family causing a reason for her mother-in-law to get rid of her. Will her love with Mao-Chun keep them inseparable....?

== Cast ==
Cast	Role	Description
Liza Wang	Hitara Sheok Lan 喜塔臘鑠蘭	Ling Fung-Tak's wife. Ling Mao-Chun's mother. Tin Lik's mother-in-law.
Myolie Wu	Tin Lik 田力	Ling Mao-Chun's wife Hitara's daughter-in-law. Kwan Ling-Shan's Love Rival.
Bosco Wong	Ling Mao-Chun, pat lau ming 甯茂春	The "Nameless" Hero; Tin Lik's husband. Hitara and Ling Fung-Tak's son. Kwan Ling-Shan's Admirer.
Bill Chan	Ling Fung-Tak 甯豐德	Hitara's husband. Ling Mao-Chun's father. Ling Law Wai-hing's son Loong Hao-Hao's past lover.
Christine Ng	Loong Hao-Hao 龍巧巧	Tin Lik's aunt. Ning Fung-Tak's past lover.
Gordon Liu	Tin Moon 田滿	Tin Lik's father.
Suet Nei	Ling Law Wai-hing 甯羅慧卿	Ling Fung-Tak’s mother. Ling Mao-Chun's grandmother.
Lee Shing-Cheung	Kwan Sing 關勝	Ling Mao-Chun's master. Kwan Ling-Shan's father.
Casper Chan (陳凱怡)	Kwan Ling-Shan 關靈珊	Kwan Sing's daughter. Admires Ling Mao-Chun. Tin Lik's Love Rival.
Stephen Wong	Cheung Yau-Nin 張有年	

== Awards and nominations ==
- Wars of In-Laws won the "Best Drama" Award, at the 38th TVB Anniversary Awards in 2005.
- Liza Wang won her second "Best Actress in a Leading Role" Award for her role Hei Tap-Lap, at the 38th TVB Anniversary Awards in 2005.
- Bosco Wong won the "Most Vastly Improved Actor" Award for his role Ning Mao Chun, at the 38th TVB Anniversary Awards in 2005.

== Viewership ratings ==
	Week	Episode	Average Points	Peaking Points	References
1	July 18–22, 2005	1 — 5	34	—	
2	July 25–29, 2005	6 — 10	34	—	
3	August 1–5, 2005	11 — 15	32	—	
4	August 8–12, 2005	16 — 20	35	38	
