= The Price of Greed =

Television series

- Poster
- 千謊百計
- Genre: Period Drama
- Starring: Bosco Wong; Sammul Chan; Kate Tsui; Shirley Yeung
- Opening theme: "角色" by Bosco Wong
- Country of origin: Hong Kong
- Original language: Cantonese
- No. of episodes: 20

Production
- Running time: 45 minutes (approx.)

Original release
- Network: TVB

The Price of Greed (Traditional Chinese: 千謊百計) is a TVB period drama series released overseas in December 2006 and aired on TVB Pay Vision Channel in January 2008.

== Synopsis ==
When Lui To (Bosco Wong) was just a child, he and another girl, Yan Yuet-Mui (Shirley Yeung), were kidnapped on the same day by an organization which captured children in order to sell and exploit them for labour. Lui To and Yan Yuet-Mui were able to escape with the help of Lo Sei Leung (Kingdom Yuen), a woman who worked for the organization but had wanted to leave for a long time.

On the run from the organization, the three become a family and live day to day on the money earned from Lo Sei-Leung's cons. Lui To's ways and sense of justice gets the better of them when Yan Yuet-Mui ends up with a fever; since Lui To had given the last of their money to a beggar, they accept medicine from a medicine seller which leaves Yan Yuet-Mui mute.

Many years later, Lui To becomes a police officer while Yan Yuet-Mui attends school and plays the violin. Lui To falls in love with a wealthy girl, Lam Ping (Kate Tsui), but is disappointed to discover she is in love with Tsui Fung (Sammul Chan), a con artist. He is unaware that Yan Yuet Mui has a crush on him, seeing her only as a younger sister. In order to protect Lam Ping, Lui To investigates Tsui Fung and discovers his dark past. Though he is unable to stop Lam Ping from marrying Tsui Fung, he must try and save her from becoming another victim of Tsui Fung's cons.

== Cast ==
Cast	Role	Description
Bosco Wong	Lui To 呂濤	Police Officer; Yan Yuet-Mui's god brother. Likes Lam Ping (became Ping's boyfriend in last episode)
Shirley Yeung	Yan Yuet-Mui 殷悅妹	Lui To's god sister. Violinist, better known as a music teacher. Likes Lui To. Diagnosed with comorbidity (Autism and Selective Mutism)
Kingdom Yuen (苑瓊丹)	Lo Sei-Leung 魯四娘	Ex-Con Artist; Lui To and Yan Yuet-Mui's godparent.
Kate Tsui	Lam Ping 藍屏	Tsui Fung's wife(probably divorced before Fung's execution in last episode) (became To's girlfriend in same episode)
Samuel Kwok (郭峰)	Lam Sai-Fung 藍世鳳	Rich Merchant; Fong Miu-Chi's husband. Lam Ping and Lam Ip's father. Died in episode 16 of internal bleeding
Sam Chan	Lam Ip 藍燁	Lam Sai-Fung and Fong Miu-Chi's son. Lam Ping's step brother. Disappeared
Mary Hon (韓馬利)	Fong Miu-Chi 方妙芝	Lam Sai-Fung's wife. Lam Ip's mother.
Sammul Chan	Maau Ji /Tsui Fung 茅智/徐風	Con Artist; Lam Ping's husband. Other names: Tsui Fung (徐風), Yip Heung-Wing (葉向榮). arrested by the cops for murder and attempted murder and later executed by the lieutenant in final episode
Chan Hung Lit (陳鴻烈)	Maau Chun 茅泰	Con Artist Leader; Other names: Ha Hok-Kei (夏學祺) died of car accident at final episode

Ben Wong (黃智賢) Cheng Chi Him
程子謙|| Doctor
Dr Cheng 程医生 died of suffocation after the accident

Vivien Yeo (楊秀慧)Suen Wu Sang
孫滬生 || Dr Cheng's wife
Mrs Cheng 程太太

Henry Lo (魯振順)Lam Sai-Wong
藍世凰||Rich Merchant, Sai-Fung's brother,Yip and Ping's uncle
