= Bosco Wong =

Hong Kong actor and singer

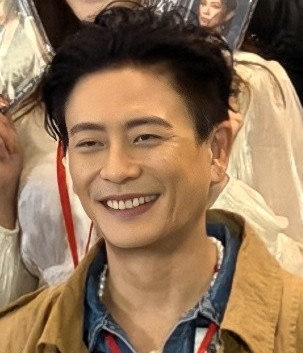
- Wong in November 2025
- Occupations: Actor; singer; entrepreneur
- Years active: 1998–present
- Awards: Europe China Image Film Festival for Best Leading Actor; 2014 Golden Brother TVB Anniversary Awards – Most Improved Male Artiste; 2005 Wars of In-laws
- Musical career
- Genres: Pop; hip hop

Chinese name
- Traditional Chinese: 黃宗澤
- Simplified Chinese: 黄宗泽
- Hanyu Pinyin: Huáng Zōngzé
- Jyutping: Wong4 Zung1 Zaak6

Bosco Wong (Chinese: 黃宗澤) is a Hong Kong actor, singer, and entrepreneur who gained popularity in the modern drama Triumph in the Skies (2003). Since then, he has played a diverse spectrum of roles in television series such as Wars of In-laws (2005), Dicey Business (2006), Lives of Omission (2011), and the Flying Tiger franchise. In 2014, Wong won Best Actor at the China Image Film Festival for his performance in Golden Brother.

Wong also owns Oystermine, a restaurant located in Hong Kong.

== Acting career ==
=== 1998–2005: Early career and breakthrough ===
In 1998, Wong was spotted on the street by a talent scout and filmed a lemon tea commercial. Recruiters offered him further opportunities but Wong insisted on finishing his high school first. After graduating from secondary school, Wong joined broadcasting network TVB in 1999 at age 19. Wong hosted various variety programs and played an extra in various drama series.

Wong made his official acting debut in Burning Flame II (2002). He was subsequently cast in historical series Find The Light, and coming-of-age drama Aqua Heroes. He gained popularity as the pilot trainee Chris in the 2003 blockbuster Triumph in the Skies. He then starred as the titular character in the period action drama Wong Fei Hung - Master of Kung Fu in 2004. In 2005, he starred alongside Liza Wang and Myolie Wu in the costume comedy Wars of In-Laws. He won the TVB Award for Most Improved Actor that year.

=== 2006–2017: Mainstream success ===
Wong's performance as a socially inept youth in Dicey Business (2006) earned him more popularity and recognition as a rising actor. He made his film debut in the 2008 film The Luckiest Man. In 2011, he starred as the triad leader "Bai Co" or "Cripple Co" in Lives of Omission (2011). He expressed that his older age allowed him to play more mature characters, such as triad leader "Cripple Co" in Lives of Omission and Inspector Hui in Witness Insecurity (2012). He described "Cripple Co" as a role he particularly enjoyed.

Wong was cast as Chiu Bing in director Fire Lee's debut movie Love In Time (2012) and gained positive applause for his sincere and realistic performance. He received positive reviews for his performance as the central character Sit Ho Ching in Golden Brother. which subsequently won him Best Leading Actor award at the 2014 China Image Film Festival.

Wong starred Di Renjie in the Gong'an drama Young Sherlock (2014).

Wong starred in the 2016 drama series Two Steps From Heaven, alongside Priscilla Wong, Edwin Siu, and Louis Cheng. He portrays Sheldon Chun, a public relations director who, in hopes of climbing the social ladder, becomes ruthless.

In December 2016, Wong announced he will not be renewing his management contract with TVB, ending his 17-year career at the station. His last TVB drama was Heart of Greed 3.

=== 2018–present: Shaw Brothers ===
Wong joined Shaw Brothers Studio in 2017. He starred in the action crime drama series Flying Tiger and Guardian Angel. In December 2018, During the filming of Flying Tiger 2, Wong was injured during an action scene, suffering a fracture in his left foot. He underwent surgery and was hospitalized for five days. He resumed filming in January and used a stunt double for the rest of his action scenes. Wong began filming the web drama series White War in April 2019, in which he portrays an undercover cop. Wong began filming for the third installment of the Flying Tiger franchise in July 2020.

== Singing career ==
In October 2008, Bosco signed a record deal with East Asia Music and released his debut EP in December of the same year.

== Personal life ==
Wong began dating War of In-laws co-star Myolie Wu in 2005. On July 25, 2012, Wong announced that the two had split. In 2014, Wong began dating model Vanessa Yeung. The two were seen together on a date on February 3. The couple broke up later that year.

== Filmography ==
=== Film ===
Year	Title	Role	Notes
2008	The Luckiest Man 《大四喜》	Ah Fai 何輝	China production
2009	Happy Sheep and Big Bad Wolf 《喜羊羊與灰太狼之牛氣衝天》	Grey Wolf 灰太狼	Voice Actor (Cantonese); SMG China Production
2010	72 Tenants of Prosperity 《72家租客》	Ha Chai Tai Long 哈仔太郎	Shaw Brothers production
2010	My Sassy Girl 2 《我的野蛮女友2》	Yang Guo 楊過	China Production
2011	I Love Hong Kong 《我愛HK開心萬歲》	Ng Shun(youth) 吳順	Shaw Brothers production
2011	The Fortune Buddies 《勁抽福祿壽》	Ben (Guest Star)	Shaw Brothers production
2011	Turning Point 2 《Laughing Gor之潛罪犯》	Michael So Sing Pak 蘇星柏	Shaw Brothers production
2012	I Love Hong Kong 2012 《2012我愛HK 喜上加囍》	Lok Yi Ah 樂易瓦	Shaw Brothers production
2012	Love In Time 《等我愛你》	Chiu Bing 秋炳	Sun Entertainment Culture Limited production
2012	Starts Good Ends Good		
2013	Together 《在一起》	Mr. Lam	Joy Movies (Shanghai) production
2013	I Love Hong Kong 2013 《2013我愛HK 喜上加囍》	Song Chi Hung	Shaw Brothers Production
2014	Golden Brother 《男人唔可以窮》	Sit Ho Ching	Won - Best Leading Actor at Europe China Image Film Festival 2014, London; Nominated - Best Actor at Macau International Movie Festival 2014(Top 5)
2016	Buddy Cops 《神獸刑警》		Shaw Brothers production
2021	G Storm 《G風暴》	Ching Fei-hung	
TBA	Endless Battle 《無間一戰》	Pang Kin-shing	

=== Television series ===
==== Mainland chinese ====
Year	Title	Role	Notes/Ref.
2012	Racecourse 《跑馬場》	Zuo Tian Yi 左天一	CCTV8 and Communication University of China production Apr 2012 - TV premier on CCTV8
2014	Young Sherlock 《少年神探狄仁杰》	Detective Dee (Di Renjie) 狄仁傑	Huan Rui Century Light Media production Summer 2014 premier in various China TV channels
2015	Women on the Breadfruit Tree 《面包树上的女人》	Lin Fang Wen 林方文	Shanghai Xinhai production
Post Production	Mad Detective Yang Jin Bang 《神探杨金邦》	Yang Jin Bang 杨金邦	Hengdian Film Production Ltd, Greentown Media production
Post Production	Lasting Affection 《愛讓我們在一起》	Yu Xiao Meng 余小萌	中视鸿歌(北京) production
2015	Destined to Love You 《偏偏喜歡你》	Chen Wen Tao 沈文濤	Zhejiang Dream Star Park Studios production
2017	The Starry Night, The Starry Sea II	Mo Hen	
2019	Your Secret 《我知道你秘密》	Lu Beichen/Lu Beishen	Acted as twin brothers for the show
2020	White War 《战毒》	Turbo 韦俊轩	
2026	My Dearest Stranger	Zhu He	
Upcoming	Guys with Kids《奶爸当家》		

==== Hong Kong TVB ====
Year	Title	Role	Notes/Ref.
2000	Lost In Love		Extra
2000	At the Threshold of an Era II 《創世紀2》		Extra
2000	A Matter of Customs 《雷霆第一關》		Extra
2001	The Awakening Story 《婚前昏後》		Extra
2002	Slim Chances 《我要Fit一Fit》		Extra
2002	Burning Flame II 《烈火雄心II》	Cheung Li Hei 張利喜	Minor Role
2003	Aqua Heroes 《戀愛自由式》	Chui Siu Lui, Louis 塗少磊	
2003	Find the Light 《英雄‧刀‧少年》	Tam Chi Tong 譚嗣同	
2003	Triumph in the Skies 《衝上雲霄》	Chris Tse 謝立豪	
2004	To Love with No Regrets	Luk Maan Tau 陸萬斗	
2004	The Last Breakthrough 《天涯俠醫》	Tung Chi Sum 童子琛	
2004	Wong Fei Hung - Master of Kung Fu 《我師傅係黃飛鴻》	Wong Fei Hung 黃飛鴻	
2005	Wars of In-Laws 《我的野蠻奶奶》	Ling Mau Chun/Bat Lau Ming 甯茂春	Won - TVB Award for Most Improved Actor
2005	Life Made Simple 《阿旺新傳》	Chung Zi Chung, Michael 鍾子聰	
2005	Fantasy Trend/The Zone - Ep 12: A Day as Death 《奇幻潮》	Chan Jun Biu 陈骏骠	One Episode
2006	Lethal Weapons of Love and Passion 《覆雨翻雲》	Han Pak 韓柏	
2006	Under the Canopy of Love 《天幕下的戀人》	Kuen Lik, Nick 權力	Nominated - TVB Award for Best Actor; Nominated - TVB Award for My Favourite Male Character
2006	Au Revoir Shanghai 《上海傳奇》	Shek Sai Gau 石世九	Overseas/TVB Pay Vision Only
2006	Dicey Business 《賭場風雲》	Chai Foon Lok/Cheung Lai Fu 齊歡樂/張來富	Nominated - TVB Award for My Favourite Male Character
2006	The Price of Greed 《千謊百計》	Lui To 呂濤	Overseas/TVB Pay Vision Only
2007	Heart of Greed 《溏心風暴》	Tong Chi Yat, Gilbert 唐至逸	
2007	Devil's Disciples 《強劍》	Shing Fung/Sze Ma Fung 成風/司馬風	Nominated - TVB Award for Best Actor (Top 20)
2008	Wars of In-Laws II 《野蠻奶奶大戰戈師奶》	Gwo Duk, Kyle 戈德	Nominated - TVB Award for My Favourite Male Character (Top 10)
2008	The Seventh Day 《最美麗的第七天》	Hui Wai Yan, Don 許懷仁	
2008	Moonlight Resonance 《溏心風暴之家好月圓》	Ling Chi Shun, Ling B 凌至信	
2008-2009	The Gem of Life 《珠光寶氣》	Shek Tai Chuen, William 何泰川	Won - 2009 15th Shanghai TV Festival: Most Potential Actor Award
2009	Burning Flame III 《烈火雄心3》	Fong Lee On, Encore 方履安	Nominated - TVB Award for Best Actor (Top 5)
2010	Don Juan De Mercado 《情人眼裡高一D》	Kan Lik Shun 廑力信	2010 CNY 6 Episodes Comedy
2010	Growing Through Life 《摘星之旅》	Chung Lam Dai, Linus 鍾林大	TVB-SMG Cooperation Drama; Nominated - TVB Award for Best Actor (Top 15)
2010	Every Move You Make 《讀心神探》	Ho Lai-yin, Trevor 何禮賢	
2011	7 Days in Life 《隔離七日情》	Chiu Chin-lung 趙展龍	
2011	Grace Under Fire 《女拳》	Lui Ching-lung 雷正龍	
2011	Lives of Omission 《潛行狙擊》	Bai Co/So Sing Pak, Michael 跛Co/蘇星柏	Nominated — TVB Anniversary Award for Best Actor (Top 5); Nominated — TVB Anniversary Award for My Favourite Male Character (Top 5); Nominated - Ming Pao Anniversary Award for Outstanding Actor in Television; Won - My Astro On Demand Awards for My Top 15 Favourite Television Characters
2012	Witness Insecurity 《護花危情》	Hui Wai Sam/Hui Sir 許瑋琛	Nominated - TVB Anniversary Award for Best Actor (Top 10); Nominated - TVB Anniversary Award for My Favourite Male Character (Top 10); Won - My Astro On Demand Awards for My Top 15 Favourite Television Characters; Nominated - TV Drama Awards Made in China for Most Popular HK/Taiwan Actor (Top 5); Won - StarHub TVB Awards My Favourite TVB Male Character
2013	A Change Of Heart 《好心作怪》	Yiu Yat San(Dr. Yiu)/Yiu Yuet San(Siu Yiu) 姚日山/姚月山	Won - StarHub TVB Awards My Favourite Onscreen Couple(with Niki Chow)
2013-2014	Coffee Cat Mama 《貓屎媽媽》	Bao Chi Tai 鮑址堤	
2014	The Ultimate Addiction 《點金聖手》	Cheuk Yuk 卓彧	Won - StarHub TVB Award My Favourite TVB Male Character; Nominated - TVB Award for Best Actor(Top 15); Nominated - TVB Award for Most Favourite Male Character(Top 15)
2015	Under the Veil 《無雙譜》	Cheung Chan 張珍	Nominated - StarHub TVB Award for My Favourite TVB Actor; Nominated - StarHub TVB Award for My Favourite TVB Male TV Character
2016	K9 Cop 《警犬巴打》	Lai Yat-tsau 黎溢湫	
2016	Two Steps from Heaven 《幕後玩家》	Sheldon Chun Shing-hoi 秦昇海	Nominated - TVB Anniversary Award for Best Actor (Top 5)
2017	Heart and Greed 《溏心風暴3》	Ling Shing-fung 凌乘風	
2022	Forensic Heroes V 《法證先鋒V》	Yu Sing-pak 余星柏	Nominated - TVB Anniversary Award for Best Actor (Top 10); Nominated - TVB Anniversary Award for Most Popular Male Character; Nominated - TVB Anniversary Award for Favourite TVB Actor in Malaysia (Top 10); Nominated - TVB Anniversary Award for Most Popular Onscreen Partnership (with Venus Wong)
2023	The Queen of News 《新聞女王》	Koo Siu-wa, Kingston 古肇華	Guest Appearance (Episode 25)
2024	Forensic Heroes VI 《法證先鋒VI：倖存者的救贖》	Yu Sing-pak 余星柏	
2025	Prism Breaker 《執法者們》	Chow Jun-kit 周俊傑	
2025	The Queen of News 2 《新聞女王2》	Koo Siu-wa, Kingston 古肇華	

==== Shaw Brothers ====
Year	Title	Role	Notes
2018	Flying Tiger 《飛虎之潛行極戰》	Vincent Ko Ka-long 高家朗	
2018	Guardian Angel 2018 Web Drama 《守護神之保險調查》	Bak Tin-ming 百天明	
2019	Flying Tiger II 《飛虎之雷霆極戰》	Eddie Wong Kwok-dong 汪國棟	
2020	The Impossible 3 《非凡三俠》	Chan Chan 陳燦	
2021	Flying Tiger III 《飛虎之壯志英雄》	Cheung Ka-hin 張嘉軒	
2022	Mission Run 《廉政狙擊·黑幕》	Lok Tsz-fung 洛子峰	

==== Programme host ====
2016 - Summer Sweetie 夏日甜心 2011 - Water of Life 水之源 (Won: 2011 TVB Anniversary Awards Best Informative Programme)
2009 - Wine Confidential 尋味葡萄
2000~2002 - 非常音乐空间
2001~2002 - 欢乐今宵
2000~2001 - 和你玩得喜
2001 - 世纪狂欢飞跃
2000 - 中国奥运金牌选手龙的光辉大汇演
2000 - 英皇超新星大赛
2000 - TVB.com 直check电视城
2000 - 永安旅游话系知点解海南岛咁好玩

=== Music video appearances ===
Title	Artiste
"One Hit and Spread" (一拍兩散)	Joey Yung
"Technical Defeat" (技術性擊倒)	Yumiko Cheng
"Leisure Journey" (漫游)	Yennis Cheung
"Why Continue to Love" (為何要繼續愛)	Ivy Koo
"Change of Season" (換季)	Michelle Cheng
"Black Neck Tie" (黑色領帶)	Daniel Chan
"A Moment of Release" (一息間的放從)	Sharon Chan
"Girls Highschool" (女子中學)	Cherry Wong
"Survivor" (生還者)	Charlene Choi

== Discography ==
=== Album ===
2008 - Debut EP: In Love with Bosco (Release date: Dec 5, 2008)
2010 - EP: Bravo (Release date: June 3, 2010).

=== Soundtrack appearances ===
Song title	Film	Notes
"太錯"	Love In Time Soundtrack	

=== TVB series Theme song and subtheme ===
Title	Series	Notes
家規	Wars of In-Laws Themesong	Performed with Liza Wang and Myolie Wu
無人愛	Au Revoir Shanghai Themesong	
第幾天	Dicey Business Subtheme	
角色	The Price of Greed Themesong	
強劍	Devil's Disciples Themesong	Performed with Kevin Cheng
感激遇到你	Wars of In-Laws II Subtheme	Performed with Myolie Wu
盡快愛	7 Days in Life Themesong	
底線	Lives of Omission Subtheme	

=== TVB children song ===
Title	Show	Notes
哪吒傳奇	"Legend of Na-Zha" Themesong	
神話	"Greek Gods" Themesong	
軍曹 Again	"KERORO Again" Themesong	
微微笑	"KERORO軍曹" Themesong	Performed with Kevin Cheng
爆旋陀螺鋼鐵戰魂	"Keyblade Metal Fusion" Themesong	

=== Others ===
Title	Event	Notes
奧運六星 - 遇強越勇	TVB 2004 Athens Olympics Themesong	Performed with Raymond Lam, Ron Ng, Sammul Chan, Kenneth Ma, Lai Lok Yi
奧運六星 - 乘風破浪	TVB 2004 Athens Olympics Song	Performed with Raymond Lam, Ron Ng, Sammul Chan, Kenneth Ma, Lai Lok Yi
全城投入電視廣播新里程 - 算你狠	TVB City Commercial Song	Performed with Jack Wu
Put Your Hands Up	TVB 2006 FIFA World Cup Themesong	Performed with Raymond Lam, Ron Ng, and Kevin Cheng
東方神球 (Run)	TVB 2010 FIFA World Cup Themesong	Performed with Ron Ng
最幸福的事 (Theatrical Version)	TVB Witness Insecurity Themesong - Theatrical Version	Linda Chung feat. Bosco Wong's narration
雖然這個世界	Shaw Brothers Flying Tiger Subtheme	Performed with Ron Ng

== Awards ==
=== 2005 ===
- 2005 Children's Song Awards: Top Ten Children’s Songs, "Legend of Na Ja"
- 2005 38th TVB Anniversary: Most Improved Actor Award, Ling Mau Chun in Wars of In-Laws

=== 2006 ===
- 2006 Metro ShowBiz TV Awards: Most Popular Male Actor
- 2006 Next Magazine TV Awards: Top Ten TV Artistes - 3rd Place
- 2006 Next Magazine TV Awards: Happy Shop Most Energetic Artiste
- 2006 TVB Popularity Awards: Top Ten Most Popular TV Character, Ling Mau Chun in Wars of In-Laws
- 2006 TVB Popularity Awards: Most Popular On-Screen Couple - Bosco Wong and Myolie Wu
- 2006 TVB Popularity Awards: Predige Best Skin Award
- 2006 Annual Artiste Award: Best TV Actor Award - Bronze
- 2006 Astro TV Drama Award: Top 12 Favorite Character Award, as Ling Mau Chun in Wars of In-Laws
- 2006 Astro TV Drama Award: Most Bizarre Character Award, as 'knitting' Ling Mau Chun in Wars of In-Laws

=== 2007 ===
- 2007 Next Magazine TV Awards: Top Ten TV Artistes - 6th Place
- 2007 Children's Song Awards: Top Ten Children’s Songs, “Keroro Again”
- 2007 Esquire Magazine Awards: Most Promising Star
- 2007 Yahoo Popularity Awards: Most Searched Rising-Popularity Artiste
- 2007 Astro TV Drama Award: Top 12 Favorite Character Award, as Kuen Lik in Under the Canopy of Love

=== 2008 ===
- 2008 Next Magazine TV Awards: Top Ten TV Artistes - 7th Place
- 2008 Yahoo Popularity Awards:
- 2008 HIM Magazine Awards: Cover Award
- 2008 Metro Hits Awards: Newcomer with Potential
- 2008 JSG Awards: Most Popular Male Newcomer - Silver
- 2008 Sina Music Awards: Most Favourite Male Newcomer - Gold
- 2008 Astro TV Drama Award: Top 12 Favorite Character Award, as Lui To in The Price of Greed

=== 2009 ===
- 2009 15th Shanghai TV Festival: Most Potential Actor Award, William Shek Tai Chuen in The Gem of Life
- 2009 IFPI Award: Top Album Sales(Male Newcomer)

=== 2010 ===
- 2010 Next Magazine TV Awards: Top Ten TV Artistes - 7th Place

=== 2011 ===
- 2011 Next Magazine TV Awards: Top Ten TV Artistes - 7th Place
- 2011 Singapore Starhub TVB Awards: Top 5 My Favorite TVB Male TV Character, as Chung Lam Dai in Growing Through Life
- 2011 HKFDA Fashion Visionaries Award: Top 10
- 2011 Astro On Demand Favourite Award: Top 15 Favorite Character Award, as Michael So Sing Pak/Bai Co in Lives of Omission

=== 2012 ===
- 2012 Next Magazine TV Awards: Top Ten TV Artistes - 6th Place
- 2012 Singapore Starhub TVB Awards: Top 6 My Favorite TVB Male TV Character, as Michael So Sing Pak/Bai Co in Lives of Omission
- 2012 Astro On Demand Awards: Top 15 Favorite Character Award, as Hui Wai Sam/Hui Sir in Witness Insecurity
- 2012 Esquire(China) Men at His Best Award: Most Popular HK/Taiwan Artiste

=== 2013 ===
- 2013 Singapore Starhub TVB Awards: My Favorite TVB Actor
- 2013 Singapore Starhub TVB Awards: Top 6 My Favorite TVB Male TV Character, as Hui Wai Sam in Witness Insecurity
- 2013 Singapore Starhub TVB Awards: My Favourite Onscreen Couple in A Change of Heart with Niki Chow
- 2013 Astro On Demand TVB Stars Award: Top 15 Favorite Character Award, as Yiu Yat San & Yiu Yuet San in A Change of Heart

=== 2014 ===
- 2014 Singapore Starhub TVB Awards: Top 6 My Favorite TVB Male TV Character, as Cheuk Yuk in The Ultimate Addiction
- 2014 Astro On Demand TVB Stars Award: Top 15 Favorite Character Award, as Cheuk Yuk in The Ultimate Addiction
- Europe China Image Film Festival 2014:Best Leading Actor as Sit Ho Ching in Golden Brother
- 2014 47th TVB Anniversary Award:TVBC Most Popular Actor in Mainland China Award
