= Susanna Kwan =

Hong Kong singer and actress

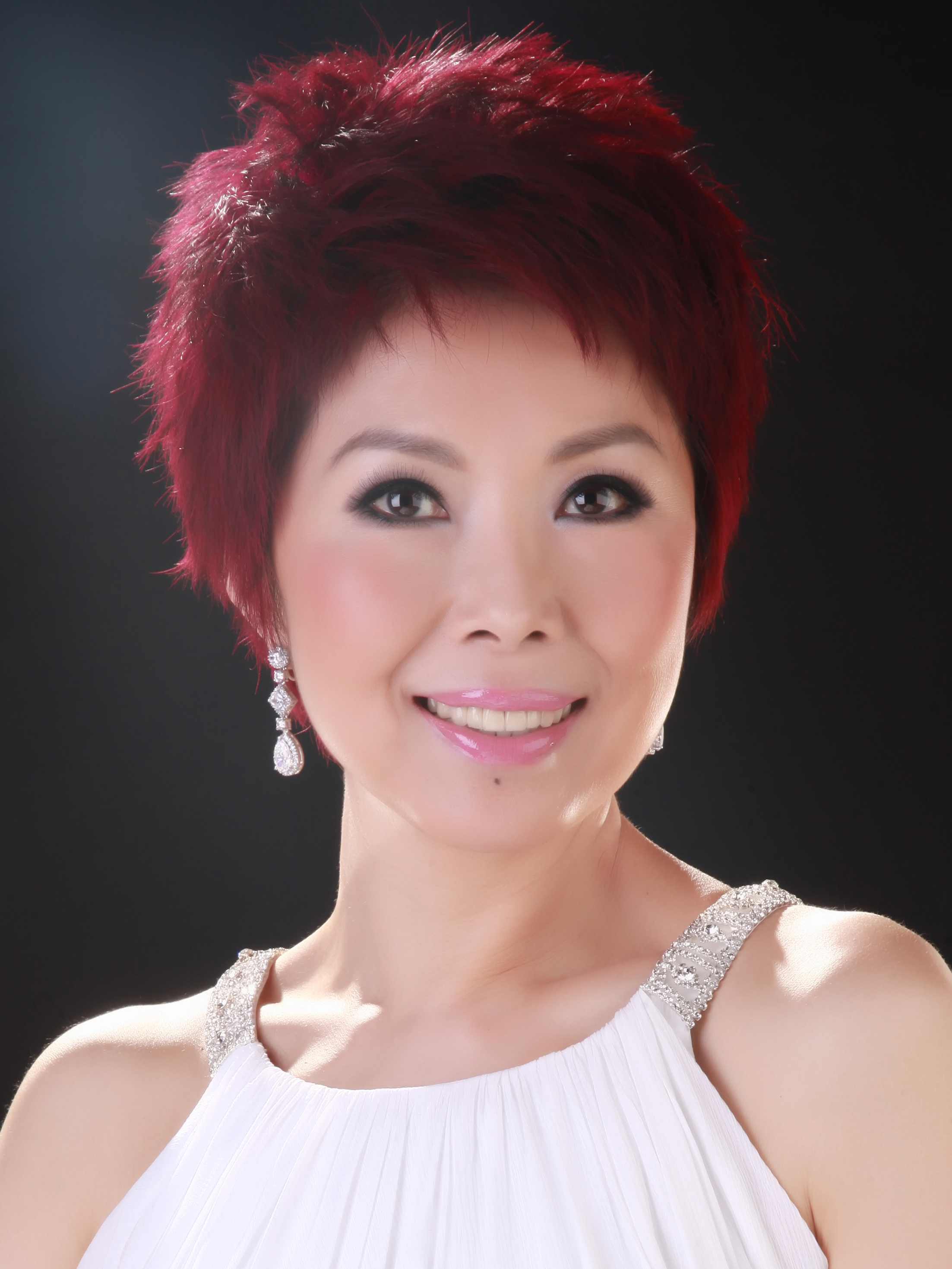
- Kwan in 2011
- Born: May 3, 1958 (age 68); British Hong Kong
- Occupations: Singer, actress
- Years active: 1975–1987, 2005–present
- Spouse: Michael Lai (m. 1982; div. 1984)
- Awards: TVB Anniversary Awards – My Favourite Female Character; 2007 Heart of Greed

Chinese name
- Traditional Chinese: 關菊英
- Simplified Chinese: 关菊英
Transcriptions
Standard Mandarin
- Hanyu Pinyin: guan1 ju2 ying1
Yue: Cantonese
- Jyutping: gwaan1 guk1 ying1
- Musical career
- Also known as: Big Doll
- Origin: Hong Kong
- Genre: Cantopop
- Instrument: Voice

Susanna Kwan Kuk-ying (born May 3, 1958) is a Hongkonger singer and actress.

== Background ==
She has recently been an actress for a number of TVB shows. Her nickname is "Big Doll" or "Small Sworn Mother" (as her performance in Wong Sau-kum of Heart of Greed). She had been married to Michael Lai Siu-tin followed by a divorce. From February 5, 1990, to 2005, she lived in Canada. She returned to Hong Kong after TVB invited her to be the host of a singing program. In July 2015, Kwan ended her eight-year relationship with TVB.

== Filmography ==
=== TV series ===
Year	Title	Role
1979	The Good, The Bad and The Ugly 《網中人》	Fong Suo Wah
1980	The Brothers 《親情》	Fung Chau Man
1982	The Emissary 《獵鷹》	Wendy Ma
1983	The Return of the Condor Heroes 《神鵰俠侶》	Lam Chiu Ying (cameo)
1984	Once Upon an Ordinary Girl 《侬本多情》	Tong Ying
2006	Glittering Days 《東方之珠》	Chu Siu-Kiu
2007	Heart of Greed 《溏心風暴》	Wong Sau Kam
2008	Moonlight Resonance 《溏心風暴2》	Salina Chung Siu Sa
2009	Beyond the Realm of Conscience 《宮心計》	Yuen Chui Wan
2010	Can't Buy Me Love 《公主嫁到》	Ding Loi-hei
2014	Overachievers 《名門暗戰》	Lee Chau Ping
2017	Heart and Greed 《溏心風暴3》	Leung Shun Wah

== Discography ==
=== Drama Soundtracks ===
Year	Drama Title	Song title	Notes
1976	Hotel	狂潮	Theme Song
1982	Demi-Gods and Semi-Devils (1982 TV series)	倆忘煙水裏	Theme Song with Michael Kwan
1985	The Flying Fox of Snowy Mountain (1985 TV series)	雪山飛狐	Theme Song with David Lui
2007	Heart of Greed	講不出聲	Theme song
2008	Moonlight Resonance	無心害你	Theme song
2009	Beyond the Realm of Conscience	宫心计	Theme Song
2010	Can't Buy Me Love	萬千寵愛	Theme song
2011	Curse of the Royal Harem	各安天命	Theme song
2014	Overachievers	真實謊言	Theme song
2017	Heart and Greed	我本無罪	Theme song

== Awards ==
TVB Anniversary Awards (2007)

- Won: My Favourite Female Character as Wong Sau Kam in Heart of Greed
- Nominated: Best Actress as Wong Sau Kam in Heart of Greed

TVB Anniversary Awards (2008)

- Nominated: Best Actress as Chung Siu Sa in Moonlight Resonance
- Nominated: My Favourite Female Character as Chung Siu Sa in Moonlight Resonance

Astro Wah Lai Toi Drama Awards 2008

- Nominated: My Favourite Female Character as Wong Sau Kam in Heart of Greed
- Won: Most Favourite Theme Song Award for the song "Speechless" in Heart of Greed

Awards and achievements
TVB Anniversary Awards
Preceded by Charmaine Sheh for Maidens' Vow	My Favourite Female Character; 2007 for Heart of Greed	Succeeded by Louise Lee for Moonlight Resonance
