= Heart of Greed =

2007 Hong Kong television series

- Heart Of Greed official poster
- Heart Of Greed (溏心風暴)
- Genre: Modern Drama
- Written by: Cheung Wah Biu; Sit Ga Wah
- Starring: Moses Chan; Linda Chung; Louise Lee; Ha Yu; Michelle Yim; Susanna Kwan; Bosco Wong; Raymond Lam; Yoyo Mung; Tavia Yeung; Louis Yuen; Lai Lok-yi; Fala Chen
- Opening theme: Speechless (講不出聲) by Susanna Kwan
- Ending theme: My Heart Understands (心領) by Raymond Lam & Linda Chung
- Country of origin: Hong Kong
- Original languages: Cantonese; Mandarin; English; Bahasa Melayu
- No. of episodes: 40 (list of episodes)

Production
- Executive producer: Lau Kar Ho
- Producer: TVB
- Production location: Hong Kong
- Running time: 45 minutes

Original release
- Network: TVB Jade
- Release: 9 April – 1 June 2007

Related
- Moonlight Resonance (2008); Heart and Greed (2017)

Heart of Greed (Chinese: 溏心風暴) is a 2007 modern drama from Hong Kong's TVB. The main actors involved in this production were Moses Chan, Linda Chung, Louise Lee, Ha Yu, Michelle Yim and Susanna Kwan.

The series received critical acclaim from audiences in Hong Kong at the time, winning several awards at the TVB Anniversary Awards in 2007, including Best Drama. It was tied as the second-best-rated drama within the final minutes of its series finale. This resulted in Heart of Greed being just 2 points behind the best-rated drama on TVB in the 2000s. A spin-off, Moonlight Resonance (溏心風暴之家好月圓), was produced and released in 2008 featuring the majority of the original cast and a different storyline.

In 2022, the drama was selected as one of ten classic TVB dramas being honoured for a new joint: Youku and TVB programme.

== Plot ==
Tong Yan-Gai (Ha Yu) owns dried sea products and abalone store along with 31 shops for rental. He has a total net worth of HK$600 million. He is married to Ling Hau (Louise Lee), a rich man's daughter, and he also has a second wife called Wong Sau-Kam (Susanna Kwan), a former nurse who had previously taken care of Hau when she had cancer. Gai has 4 children: Tong Chi-On (Moses Chan), Tong Chi-Yat (Bosco Wong), and Tong Chi-Yan (Fala Chen) by Ling Hau and Tong Chi-Foon (Lai Lok-yi) by Wong Sau-Kam. Hau had not expected to survive her bout with cancer and wanted Kam to take care of her husband after she died, but she recovered.

Kam thinks that she has no power in the family because she has no true status, as she is not legally married to Gai. She becomes a woman who instigates a range of petty acts that tend to come back to haunt her. She seeks the family fortune, and in order to do that, she causes trouble in the family. Hau becomes extremely frustrated and angry at Kam and expels her from the house. This leads to Hau's cancer resurfacing. One day in the hospital, Hau lies on her deathbed, and Kam comes to beg for forgiveness for her past actions. Hau is unable to speak, but she finally mutters a few words only audible to the ears of her son Tong Chi-Foon. Her words are "普通朋友", which means "ordinary friend". Foon, however, lies to everybody and says that Hau told him that Kam is forgiven. Foon lies because his mother put pressure on him to secure her a position in the family.

Kam starts to make plans to steal the family fortune with Sheung Joi-Duk (Lei Seng Cheung), and together, they cause trouble. Kam even creates false public accusations against her own family in the media. Kam forms her own support group from the worst family members and in-laws to help plot against the Tong household in order to gain their family fortune.

After meticulously planning with Kam, going as far as to give slander to the Tong family, she also drives Gai to severe illness and eventually dies from a stroke. Kam and Duk then begin a long war against the Tong family in an attempt to invalidate the family will to take the family fortune for their own as a means of punishing the Tong family's "mistreatment" towards her. The family is in chaos and they have only one person who can help them, a lawyer, Sheung Joi-Sum (Linda Chung).

== Cast ==
=== Tong Family ===
Actor	Role
Ha Yu	Tong Yan Gai (唐仁佳)
Louise Lee	Ling Hau (凌巧)
Susanna Kwan	Frances Wong Sau Kam (王秀琴)
Moses Chan	Tong Chi On (唐至安)
Michelle Yim	Ling Lei (凌莉)
Louis Yuen	Ling Bo (凌波)
Tavia Yeung	Jackie Cheuk Man Lai (卓文麗)
Bosco Wong	Gilbert Tong Chi Yat (唐至逸)
Lai Lok-yi	Tong Chi Foon (唐至歡)
Fala Chen	Tong Chi Yan (唐至欣)

=== Sheung family ===
Actor	Role
Linda Chung	Sheung Joi Sum (常在心)
Chow Chung	Sheung Fung (常峰)
Lei Seng Cheung	Henry Sheung Joi Duk (常在德)

=== Cheuk family (the in-laws) ===
Actor	Role
Lily Leung	Wong Lai Mei (王麗薇)
Chan On Ying	Lei Man Hong (李文紅)
Samantha Chuk	Cheuk Man Yuk (卓文玉)
Cheng Ga Shun	Cheuk Man Bong (卓文邦)

=== Others ===
Actor	Role
Raymond Lam	Alfred Ching Leung (程亮)
Yoyo Mung	Shui Ming Ha (水明霞)
Carrie Lam	Lai Cheuk Lan (黎卓蘭)
Lei Kwok Nin	Dai Gin Hei (戴建熹)
Tracy Ip	Cherry
Cecilia Fong	Lee Yuet Ying (李月瑛)
Chan Hung Lit	Chan Kwok Lit (陳國烈)
Natalie Tong	Angel
Alice Fung So-bor	Mrs. Wong (黃大嫂)
Johnson Lee	Wong Ga Wing (黃家榮)

=== Tong Family ===
- Tong Yan-Gai – Gai is a 58-year-old man who is in charge of the Tong family. He is a bubbly, fun and witty man who tries to run his family with laughs and joy. He is a self-proclaimed happy man of two wives, Ling Hau and Wong Sau Kam and four children, On, Yat, Foon, Yan. He owns a seafood store and 31 shops for rental worth $600 million HKD. He has a wealthy heritage and enjoys giving the most of his time to his family. However, if things ever go wrong, he is known to chicken out and have no bravery whatsoever, giving him the name of Tong Yan Gwai (turtle). He is extremely protective of his children and would do whatever it takes to keep them safe and happy. Throughout the series, his character matures for the better, leading him to erase his Tong Yan Gwai nickname. Despite declining health due to a stroke, he remembers Hau's words of wisdom in keeping his family together and he becomes a brave, generous and smart man, and he uses his newfound confidence to confront Wong Sau Kam in his final moments in life.
- Ling Hau – Hau is a 57-year-old woman, and she is the leading lady of the Tong family. Although she is a loving woman who was born into a rich family, she is extremely smart and honest and can tell who is a good person and who is a bad person. She is powerful and strong in her ways and would do anything to keep the Tong family running smoothly with smiles on their faces. She foresees Kam's plotting antics and thus she kicks her out. During her declining health and final days of life, she spent them with her family in a happy manner. Even on her deathbed, she was very straightforward in her act of not letting Kam back into her family.
- Wong Sau-Kam – Kam is a 52-year-old woman who is second in charge of the Tong family and is a mistress of Tong Yan Gai. Kam used to be Hau's nurse when she had cancer and was supposed to be the spouse of Tong Yan Gai, but because Hong Kong law made it illegal to have more than one wife, she was forced to be an unofficial second wife to Gai. Kam is an ungrateful and sinister figure, and she strives to do her best to retrieve the six-hundred-million-dollar fortune of the Tong family. Kam is a highly petty and arrogant figure. She's a constant schemer when it comes to making plans to make the Tong family unhappy. She easily likes people that side with her and often surround herself with unsavory characters that appeases her ego and helps her scheme ways to get what she believes the Tong family has long overdue owed her. She is a smart thinker when it comes to making plans to make the Tong family unhappy. She even forbade On, Yat, and Yan to send Gai off on his final journey when he died from a stroke. She is an unhappy woman after thinking that she would have her rightful position of the leading lady in Tong family; instead, she is neglected by Hau in her cheeky ways. At the end, she realises that she had been tricked by Duk and turns for the better, regretting her mistakes and becoming family again with the family.
- Tong Chi-On – On is a 30-year-old man who strives to do his best for the Tong family. He has a helpful attitude toward his friends and family and keeps the smiles on everybody's faces. Although his manner is regarded as loving and caring, he is gullible in his relationships and trusts in people too easily often leading to disastrous results. His greatest desire is to find his real family, as he is an adopted son of the Tong family and not of true blood. It is later revealed, however, he is really Gai's son with a third woman. His love interest is Sheung Joi Sum and although she doesn't love him, he still cares for her. He is a comic character in the beginning but by the end he matures greatly. He stands in the place of Hau after her death and is also straightforward in his acts, rejecting Kam's return to the family, much to the dismay of his father.
- Tong Chi-Yat, Tong Chi Foon, Tong Chi Yan – The remaining of Gai's children are 26, 21, and 17 years old respectively. Yat is an ambitious figure who strives to run a happy family with his controversial chain-smoking model wife, Cheuk Man-Lai (Tavia Yeung). Although Yat is ambitious, he listens to his mother and is similar to her in the way he is also straightforward. He is a figure that forgives and forgets. Foon is Kam's only son and he is a growing filmmaker who has just graduated. Foon is an innocent figure who suffers greatly from Kam's sudden outbursts which leads to her getting into trouble with family. He is character trying to find his place in a family without his mother. Yan is a youthful and playful figure who is always a pleasure to be around. She is a flirty at the beginning but slowly matures during the series. She loves her family members but can be very moody when she discovers that some of them are traitors.
- Ling Lei – Lei is the 45-year-old sister of Hau and is extremely biased and moody, especially against Kam. She wants the best for the Tong family and is the main reason for the Tong family's wealth. She, like her sister is straightforward and willing to forgive and forget. She stands in place of Hau and Gai after their deaths. She is loving of her family but strict in many ways.
- Ling Bo – Bo is the 37-year-old greedy brother of Hau and Lei. He was a loving uncle when Hau was around, but became greedy after being bribed with cheques by Kam to side with her and with the fact that he inherited HK$8 million before he was 20 when the Lings' father died. He was invited join Kam's side for a stake in the family assets, and created uproars in the Tong family after gambling away large sums of money from his family's bank account. He also developed a great dislike to On, who mistakenly accused Bo of stealing more money.
- Cheuk Man Lai Jackie and her family – Lai is a 26-year-old woman born to a dentist father and a servant mother. She started off as a controversial chain-smoking model, with a violent husband who she had no more feelings with. However, she continued to respect her husband's father and tried to conceal the details about her affair with Yat. After her divorce with her husband, she entered the Tong family, where very few people accepted her, including Hau. After the realisation of her mistakes, Hau accepts her. After she is accepted into the family and through thorough teachings from Hau, she matures to become a woman who loves the Tong family greatly and is thankful for all that she has in life. Lai's family, in return, is a complete contrast to her. As extremely greedy people, they use the Tong family as a bank and took $5,000,000 HKD in one visit to fund the restaurant that Hau offered them as a gift for Yat and Lai's marriage and once requested 4 shops as a dowry. Lai's family ultimately combines with Kam and Duk's plot to obtain a share of the Tong assets. They are hated by the Tong's including Lai herself. They never regret their mistakes, even by the end. Tong Sum is the baby girl born to Jackie and Gilbert.

=== Others ===
- Sheung Joi Sum – Sum is a peaceful 25-year-old girl and is a friend of Yan and On. She starts off the series as a poor, unconfident, struggling young woman trying to look after her father who has Alzheimer's disease. She rejected On, who had feelings for her, because she loved another man, Ching Leung. She ends up working with Leung in a lawyer firm. They would eventually develop a relationship, but because of their misunderstandings they would often argue and break up various times. Their final break up would be after Leung begins a third-party relationship with her best friend, Ha. Later on in the series she matures into a blooming young lady and becomes a confident emerging lawyer. On finally has a chance to confront her with a proposal after Leung's death.
- Ching Leung – Leung is a 27-year-old renowned lawyer. He is Sum's boyfriend towards the middle of the series. He is a moody but vigilant and caring figure who forever strives to do his best. Although he is a kind person, he has an inability to stay faithful and succumbs. At one point he had an affair with Sheung Joi Sum's best friend Shui Mak Mak, but he kept it quiet and reconciled with Sheung Joi Sum without admitting anything about the matter. Eventually, information would slip and Sheung Joi Sum actively demands to know who was the other woman, but Ching felt exposing this matter would ruin everything and insists for her to drop the matter since he admitted his mistakes and assures Sheung Joi Sum it would never happen again. Sheung Joi Sum wasn't satisfied with such an answer and whenever he tried to comfort her, Tong Chi On would be around and he becomes jealous. After the big secret was exposed, everyone parted ways for some time and Leung would try to patch things between him and Sheung Joi Sum. Despite the fact that they broke up, Leung continues to love Sum. This is shown when he continues to write in his blog, Days without Sheung Joi Sum, three years after the breakup. He also helps Sheung Joi Sum think of ideas to defend Ling Lei. He eventually dies of a car crash in the end, because he was thinking about Sheung Joi Sum's decision to forgive him or not. Although he could be saved, he refuses to go to the hospital, using his final moments to tell Sheung Joi Sum ways to defeat Wong Sau-Kam. Sheung Joi Sum, who forgave Leung and is willing to renew their relationship, was greatly sadden by his death.
- Shui Ming-Ha/Shui Mak Mak – Ha is Sum's best friend. She is a self-centered and power-hungry young woman who has experienced many relationships, often with them ending with disastrous results. During the series, she develops romantic feelings for Leung, and she eventually helps Leung cheat on Sum by being Leung's girlfriend, leaving Sum hurt when she finds out. Ha went away and said that she married but it wasn't true – she just wanted Sum to be happy. She returns one last time during Alfred's funeral, regretting and apologising to Sum for forgiveness.
- Sheung Joi Duk – Duk He is Sum's older brother and is the main antagonist in the series. He manages to turn Kam against the Tong family whilst she was living by herself when being kicked out of the family mansion by Hau. He is a greedy, smart but forlorn character who comes up with plans of taking the Tong family to court being hungry for the six hundred million dollars and he suffers from hair loss. In spite of On's constant generous aid to him, he schemes to get a piece of the Tong's family fortune while having multiple affairs with several women in mainland China. It's he that gave the worst malicious plans for Kam to use against the Tong family after all On had done for him. After an unsuccessful court case for the Tong assets, Duk tried to reason and convince her to fight for the Tong fortune again. Kam, angry at him for his lies, attempts to run him over. He is distraught and is never seen again.
- Lai Cheuk Lan/Cho Bang – Cho Bang is Sum, Ha, and Yan's good friend. She appears mostly at the beginning of the series and less towards the middle and end. She is a very cheerful and caring friend to Yan, Sum, and Ha.

== Ratings ==
Week	Average Points	Peak Points	Reference
1 (Episodes 1–5)	29	31	
2 (Episodes 6–10)	29		
3 (Episodes 11–15)	29		
4 (Episodes 16–20)	32	34	
5 (Episodes 21–25)	31	34	
6 (Episodes 26–30)	33	36	
7 (Episodes 31–35)	35	40	
8 (Episodes 36–40)	40	48	

== List of episodes ==
#	Original Air Date	Summary
1	April 9, 2007	Tong Yan Gai and Duk Duk Dei go to court to act as the plaintiff's witnesses, only to offend their old friends who are the defendants.; Ling Bo imports fake mushrooms to the Ton's dried foods store and Duk Duk Dei seeks out the buyer of the fake mushrooms, Seung Joi Sum.; The defendant tells Tong Yun Gai to keep his promise about Ling Hau's sickness.; Tong Yan Gai must sell four of his prized abalones and give 400,000 Hong Kong dollars to the Buddha because he made a promise that if Hau's sickness stayed away that he would do that.; Tong Yan Gai gets angry at the selling price of his abalones during a donation for a hospital, subsequently he buys them back.; Gilbert (Yat) comes back from California.
2	April 10, 2007	Gilbert gets told off by Hau for not coming back from California earlier.; The Tong family has the four abalones for dinner on Hau's birthday.; Meet the four "Golden Flowers" - Seung Joi Sum, Shui Mak Mak, Tong Chi Yan, Cho Bang.; Yan's crush - "Gei", invites her to a swimming competition.; Duk Duk Dei shoots an advertisement to help him find his parents.; The dried foods store gets a visit from the defendants where they yell at Kam and a riot begins. *The defendant's mother receives a stern talking to from Hau.; The advertisement video is shown to Duk Duk Dei.; Kam gets angry because the things the defendant said to her and to make up for it Hau lets her go to the meeting where she usually went with Gai.; Gai wins a raffle at the meeting and the prize is a holiday for the whole family, the whole family doesn't want to go with Hau because she is boring.
3	April 11, 2007	Kam and Gai secretly plan to go by themselves, they let Hau know that they are going by boat to Dubai because Hau is sea-sick. Kam wants to go to Europe.; Gai finds out Yan want to date and disallows her to go to the swimming competition because the Tong family rules are that they can't date before university has finished.; Gai and Kam go shopping for their holiday and Yan finds out who bribes Gai to let her go to the swimming competition.; Hau reveals to Lei and Duk Duk Dei that her wedding anniversary is during Gai and Kam's holiday, Duk Duk Dei comes up with an idea to allow Hau to go with them.; Gai realises that if he's going to go on a trip that he isn't going on he must have photos and gifts, so he requests the help of Yat and Foon. Yat and Foon bribe him back.; Duk Duk Dei plans a surprise visit for Gai and Kam in Dubai.; Gai and Kam's holiday plans are failed by Duk Duk Dei's plan when they hear it through the phone.; Kam gets angry at Gai for fully blaming her for the idea of ditching Hau.; Hau finds out Gai and Kam's plan and tells Yan, Foon and Yat to never bribe people.; Kam yells at Hau for overlooking as the second wife of Gai.
4	April 12, 2007	Kam is still angry at Hau, even when Hau tries to cheer her up.; Yan is caught in a rip and bitten by a stingray during the swimming competition.; Yat helps Duk Duk Dei find his legitimate father.; Shui Mak Mak goings on a shopping spree after breaking up with her boyfriend.; "The Four Golden Flowers" trick On into thinking they are his legitimate father.; Duk Duk Dei cheers up Shui Mak Mak.; Hau yells at Kam for being uptight and selfish.; Hau lets Kam add her name onto two of their properties.
5	April 13, 2007	The Tong family celebrates Hau and Gai's 35th wedding anniversary.; The four Tong children tribute for the mother and father.; Hau and Yan go to England to look at some universities.; Kam and Gai go to look at some properties to add Kam's name to them.; Sum asks On for ten thousand dollars - On promises not to tell.; Kam wants to add her name to Gai's hero's shop forcing him to leave the shop under sad circumstances.; Gai's hero finds about the misunderstanding and tells the street about Gai's embarrassing history.; Kam angers Lei after the misunderstanding - Kam refuses to apologise.; Bo insults Sum about her borrowing money from Duk Duk Dei.
6	April 16, 2007	
7	April 17, 2007	
8	April 18, 2007	
9	April 19, 2007	
10	April 20, 2007	
11	April 23, 2007	
12	April 24, 2007	
13	April 25, 2007	
14	April 26, 2007	
15	April 27, 2007	
16	April 30, 2007	
17	May 1, 2007	
18	May 2, 2007	
19	May 3, 2007	
20	May 4, 2007	
21	May 7, 2007	
22	May 8, 2007	
23	May 9, 2007	
24	May 10, 2007	
25	May 11, 2007	
26	May 14, 2007	
27	May 15, 2007	
28	May 16, 2007	
29	May 17, 2007	
30	May 18, 2007	
31	May 21, 2007	
32	May 22, 2007	
33	May 23, 2007	
34	May 24, 2007	
35	May 25, 2007	
36	May 28, 2007	
37	May 29, 2007	
38	May 30, 2007	
39	May 31, 2007	
40	June 1, 2007	

== Reception and accolades ==
Initially, the reception for the series was excellent, garnering a massive 46 peak points and topping at 48 points within the final minutes of its series finale. This resulted in Heart of Greed being only 2 points behind the highest rated drama on TVB in the 2000s: Dae Jang Geum. Critical reaction was also excellent. This was shown when a massive crowd turned out to watch the finale in a shopping centre, Discovery Park, together with the cast. At the TVB Anniversary Awards ceremony in 2007, the cast and crew were nominated and won many of the awards, including the prestigious "Best Drama" award. Elsewhere, Heart of Greed has also won many awards and excellent reception. Time Out Hong Kong named the drama among the best 17 Hong Kong television dramas of all time.

=== List of awards and nominations ===
- TVB Anniversary Awards – Best Drama
  - Heart of Greed
- TVB Anniversary Awards – Best Actor in a Leading Role
  - Moses Chan
- TVB Anniversary Awards – Best Actress in a Leading Role
  - Louise Li
- TVB Anniversary Awards – Best Actor in a Supporting Role
  - Louis Yuen
- TVB Anniversary Awards – My Most Favourite Male Character Role
  - Moses Chan
- TVB Anniversary Awards – My Most Favourite Female Character Role
  - Susanna Kwan
- Yahoo! Buzz Awards – Best Television Series
  - Heart of Greed
- Yahoo! Buzz Awards – Most Watched Series
  - Heart of Greed
- Mingpao Awards – Best Actress on Television
  - Louise Li
- Mingpao Awards – Best Series on Television
  - Heart of Greed
- The Next Magazine TV Awards 2008 – Next Magazine Top Ten TV Programmes
  - Heart of Greed
- The Next Magazine TV Awards 2008 – Next Magazine Top Ten TV Artists
  - Louise Li
- The Next Magazine TV Awards 2008 – Next Magazine Top Ten TV Artists
  - Moses Chan
- The Next Magazine TV Awards 2008 – Next Magazine Top Ten TV Artists
  - Raymond Lam
- The Next Magazine TV Awards 2008 – Next Magazine Top Ten TV Artists
  - Bosco Wong
- The Next Magazine TV Awards 2008 – Next Magazine Top Ten TV Artists
  - Linda Chung
- The Next Magazine TV Awards 2008 – Next Magazine Top Ten TV Artists
  - Susanna Kwan
- 2009 : 2008 ASTRO Wah Lai Toi's Award – Favourite Couple
  - Raymond Lam and Linda Chung
- Television Committee Awards – Best Television Programs of 2007
  - Heart of Greed - 4th Place
- Number One Television Awards – Actress with Most Potential
  - Fala Chen

=== List of nominations (Top 5 finalists) ===
- TVB Anniversary Awards – Best Actor in a Leading Role
  - Ha Yu
- TVB Anniversary Awards – Best Actress in a Leading Role
  - Linda Chung
- TVB Anniversary Awards – Best Actress in a Leading Role
  - Susanna Kwan
- TVB Anniversary Awards – My Most Favourite Male Character Role
  - Ha Yu
- TVB Anniversary Awards – My Most Favourite Male Character Role
  - Raymond Lam
- TVB Anniversary Awards – My Most Favourite Female Character Role
  - Linda Chung
- TVB Anniversary Awards – My Most Favourite Female Character Role
  - Louise Li
- TVB Anniversary Awards – Most Vastly Improved Actor
  - Lai Lok-yi
- TVB Anniversary Awards – Most Vastly Improved Actress
  - Fala Chen

== Indirect sequels ==
=== Moonlight Resonance ===
The series was successful enough to be commissioned for a sequel. The tentative title for the new series was Heart of Greed II with its Chinese title, 溏心風暴之家好月圓. The sales presentation clip was released on November 19, 2007, which featured Michelle Yim as the new villain and a mooncake business instead of Heart of Greed's abalone. On June 9, 2008, its official working English title was released as Moonlight Resonance. The series surpassed the original in terms of support and viewership.

=== Heart and Greed ===
Another series featuring several main cast members was released in 2017. The series was met with mixed to negative reviews.

== DVD release ==
Language/s	Episodes	Discs	DVD release date
Cantonese; Mandarin	40	10	Hong Kong: June 11, 2007; Region 3
This release of Heart of Greed includes all 40 episodes. Special features include behind the scenes, golden quotes and more.
