= Louise Lee =

- Years active: 1968–1999, 2007–present
- Awards: TVB Anniversary Awards – Best Actress; 2007 Heart of Greed; My Favourite Female Character; 2008 Moonlight Resonance; Lifetime Achievement Award; 2010

Chinese name
Transcriptions
Standard Mandarin
- Hanyu Pinyin: Lǐ Sīqí
Yue: Cantonese
- Jyutping: Lei^{5} Si^{1} Kei^{4}
- Musical career
- Also known as: Mrs Tan Ah Him

Louise Lee Si-kei (Chinese: 李司棋) is a Hong Kong actress and former Chinese Canadian newscaster.

== Biography ==
Lee was crowned in 1968 when she competed in the Hong Kong Princess beauty pageant. Lee left Hong Kong in the mid to late 1980s and briefly was a news anchor at Toronto's Chinavision Canada station. She left Canada and returned to Hong Kong to resume her acting career with TVB.

Lee, Liza Wang, Gigi Wong, Angie Chiu were named the 4 most valued TVB actresses in the 1970s and 1980s.

In 2007, she won the coveted Best Actress award in the 40th TVB Anniversary Awards for her role as Ling Hau in Heart of Greed.

In 2008, she won the My Favourite Female Character award at the 41st TVB Anniversary Awards for her role as Chung Siu-Hor in Moonlight Resonance.

At the 2010 TVB Anniversary Awards, she won the Lifetime Acting Achievement Award, being the first to win 3 major awards.

In December 2014, Lee ended her contract with TVB with her last appearance in Romantic Repertoire as Lin Sau-Fong. She will be pursuing acting roles in Mainland China in the future.

== Personal life ==
Lee was treated for cancer and continues to live in Hong Kong and travels to Canada to visit her family. Her daughter is Toronto radio DJ Leslie Yip with A1 Chinese Radio (formerly with Toronto First Radio). She is a Christian and a member of Artistes Christian Fellowship.

== Filmography ==
=== MediaCorp TV Channel 8 series ===
Year	Drama	Role	Notes
2005	Portrait of Home 同心圆	Li Tian 李甜	
2005	Portrait of Home II 同心圆 II	Li Tian 李甜	
2011	The In-Laws 麻婆斗妇	Lin Baozhu 林宝珠	
2019	Old is Gold 老友万岁	Liang Shanrong 梁善蓉	

=== TVB series ===
Year	Title	Role	Notes
1976	Sai Gai Ming Chu 《世界名著》		
1976	Chuk Nu Sing 《七女性》		
1976	The Legend of the Book and the Sword 《書劍恩仇錄》	駱 冰	
1978	Siu Sub Yat Long 《蕭十一郎》	沈碧君	
1978	The Giants 《強人》	香若楠	
1978	Vanity Fair 《大亨》	黃 梅	
1979	The Passenger 《抉擇》	韓映雪	
1979	Nu Yan Sam Sub 《女人三十》		
1979	Chor Lau-heung 《楚留香》	Lau Mo-mei	
1980	Five Easy Pieces 《輪流傳》	解文意	
1980	No Biz Like Showbiz 《山水有相逢》	梅 妹	
1980	Foon Lok Kwon Ying 《歡樂群英》	紅玫瑰	
1981	No One is Innocent 《逐個捉》	白芙蓉	
1981	Mo Seung Po 《無雙譜》	鯉魚精／金牡丹	
1981	The Misadventure of Zoo 《流氓皇帝》	易蓉蓉	
1982	Sing Chun 《星塵》	姚 韻	
1982	Ladies of the House 《神女有心》	常念奴	
1983	The Woman Reporter 《無冕天使》	葉 亭	
1983	Beyond the Rose Garden 《再見十九歲》	康 妮	
1983	Joi Sung Yuen 《再生緣》	駱 冰	
1983	The Legend of The Condor Heroes 《射鵰英雄傳》	Bao Xiruo 包惜弱	
1984	Jil Gau Man Ng Chil Gai Yan 《朝九晚五俏佳人》		
1985	Cho Tai Yan Yuen 《錯體姻緣》	姚黛仙	
1990	Jil Yeung 《朝陽》		
1990	Priceless Adventure 《香港蛙人》	陸笑媚	
1990	Cha Bo Sai Ga 《茶煲世家》	陸家玲	
1991	Letting Go 《三喜臨門》	芷 君	
1991	One Step Beyond 《老友鬼鬼》		
1991	Family Squad 《卡拉屋企》	劉嬌嬌	
1992	The Key Man 《巨人》	李秀慧	
1992	The Change of Time 《龍的天空》	周禮嫻	
1995	A Kindred Spirit 《真情》	Leung Yun Shin 梁潤善	
2007	Heart of Greed 《溏心風暴》	Ling Hau 凌巧	TVB Award for Best Actress; Ming Pao Anniversary Award for Outstanding Actress in Television; Nominated – TVB Award for My Favourite Female Character (Top 5)
2008	Moonlight Resonance 《溏心風暴之家好月圓》	Chung Siu Ho 鍾笑荷	TVB Award for My Favourite Female Character; Nominated – TVB Award for Best Actress (Top 5)
2008-2009	The Gem of Life 《珠光寶氣》	Hong Bak Siu-Yau 康白筱柔	
2009	The Stew of Life 《有營煮婦》	Lo Siu Lai 魯小麗	Nominated – TVB Award for Best Actress; Nominated – TVB Award for My Favourite Female Character
2010	Some Day 《zh:天天天晴》	Ming Sum-on	Nominated – TVB Award for Best Actress; Nominated – TVB Award for My Favourite Female Character
2011	Only You	Chong Si-tim	Nominated – TVB Award for Best Actress; Nominated – TVB Award for My Favourite Female Character
2011	The Other Truth	Fong Siu Lan	Guest Star
2013	Reality Check	Lau Tsui Wan	Nominated – TVB Award for Best Actress; Nominated – TVB Award for My Favourite Female Character
2013	Brother's Keeper	Chow Yuk Mui	Nominated – TVB Award for Best Supporting Actress
2014	Ruse of Engagement	Tong Suk Fun	
2015	Romantic Repertoire	Lin Sau-fong	
2015	Raja Pahat	Beduk	
2017	Heart and Greed 《溏心风暴3》	凌丽萤	

== Awards and nominations ==
=== TVB Anniversary Awards ===
- 2007: Best Actress (Heart of Greed)
- 2008: My Favourite Female Character (Moonlight Resonance)
- 2010: Lifetime Achievement Award

=== Others ===
Astro Wah Lai Toi Drama Awards 2008 – Favourite Leading Actress Award – Role as Ling Hau in Heart of Greed.

Astro Wah Lai Toi Drama Awards 2008 – Most Unforgettable Moment Award – the scene in which she as the 'Dai Kei' quarrels with 'Sai Kei' regarding 'Sai Kei' and Ling Bo handling 'dirty-money' business in Episode 13.

Astro Wah Lai Toi Drama Awards 2008 – Top 12 Favourite Characters Award – one of the character won in the category, as Ling Hau in Heart of Greed.

Awards and achievements
TVB Anniversary Awards
Preceded by Charmaine Sheh for Maidens' Vow	Best Actress; 2007 for Heart of Greed	Succeeded by Michelle Yim for Moonlight Resonance
Preceded by Susanna Kwan for Heart of Greed	My Favourite Female Character; 2008 for Moonlight Resonance	Succeeded by Tavia Yeung for Beyond the Realm of Conscience
