= Louis Yuen =

Hong Kong actor

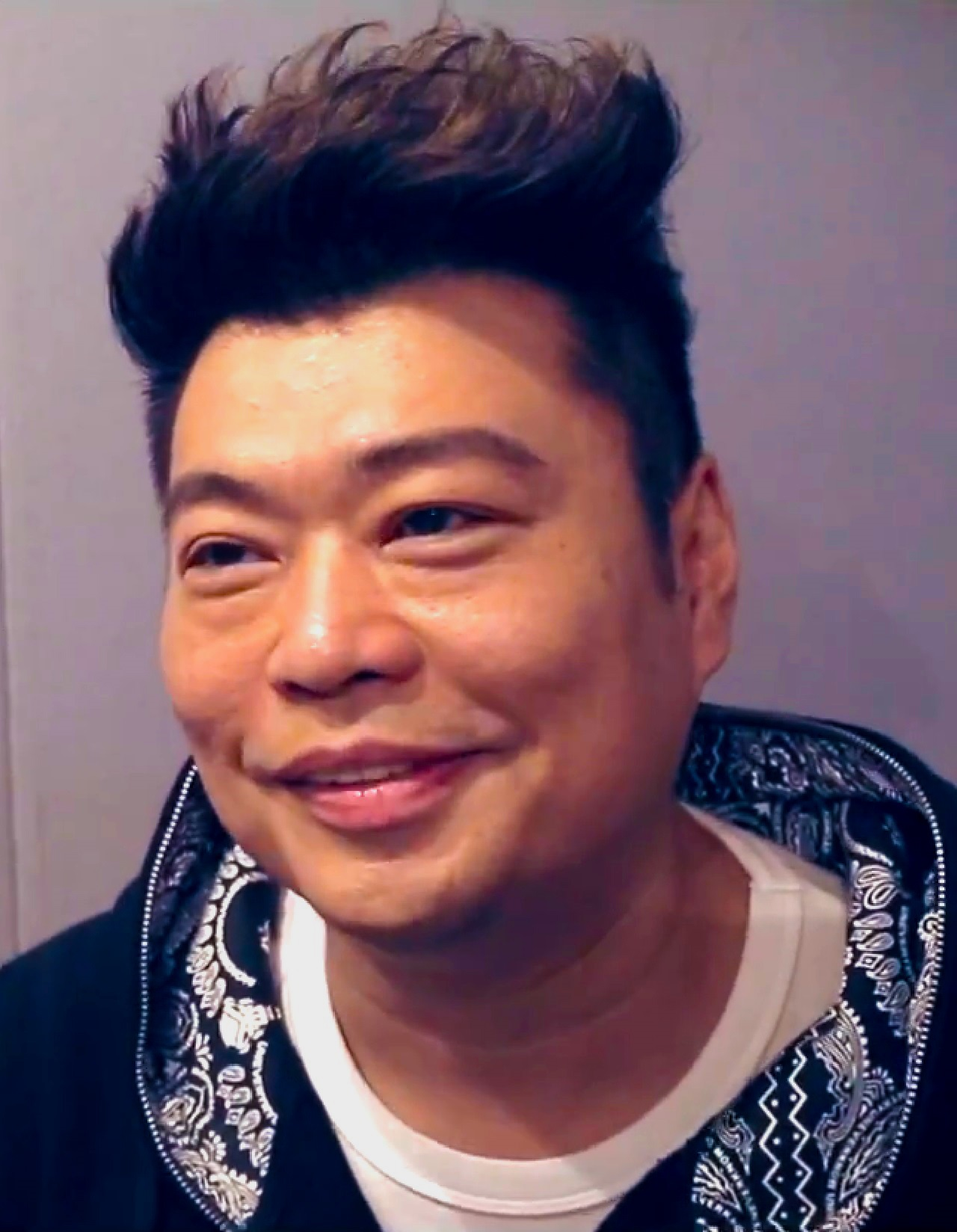
- Yuen in 2014
- Born: May 23, 1967 (age 59); British Hong Kong
- Occupations: Actor; singer; host
- Awards: TVB Anniversary Awards – Best Supporting Actor; 2007 Heart of Greed; Best Presenter; 2009 Super Trio Supreme; 2010 Fun with Liza and Gods

Chinese name
- Chinese: 阮兆祥
Transcriptions
Standard Mandarin
- Hanyu Pinyin: Ruǎn Zhàoxiáng

Louis Yuen Siu-cheung (born May 23, 1967) is a Hong Kong TVB actor. He co-hosted the Super Trio series, Super Trio Supreme, in season 8 with Eric Tsang, Chin Kar-lok, and Wong Cho-lam. He also co-hosted the Fun with Liza and Gods series with Liza Wang, Johnson Lee and Wong Cho-Lam. Finalist in the 1984 3rd TVB New Talent Singing Awards.

== Filmography ==
Actor

Year	Title	Role	Notes
1993	The Chord of Victory 少年五虎	Chan Siu Cheung 陳兆祥	
2000	The Legend of Lady Yang 楊貴妃	On Luk San 安祿山	
2000	When Dream Come True 夢想成真	Yu Wing Fat 余永發	
2000	Street Fighters 廟街·媽·兄弟	Ngor Lam 柯南	
2001	Colourful Life 錦繡良緣	Ching Chi Bok 程智博	
2001	Virtues of Harmony 皆大歡喜	Yau Nim Fu 游念富	
2003	Virtues of Harmony II 皆大歡喜 (時裝版)	Lau Kam 劉錦	
2005	Women On the Run 窈窕熟女	Dong Fai 董輝	
2007	Heart of Greed 溏心風暴	Ling Po 凌波	Won: Best Supporting Actor
2008	Moonlight Resonance 溏心風暴之家好月圓	Yuen Yan Chi 袁恩賜	
2009	A Chip Off the Old Block 巴不得爸爸	Ngau Ching Wing 牛正榮	
2009	ICAC Investigators 2009 廉政行動2009	Wong Hou Nam 王浩南	
2010	Suspects in Love 搜下留情	Leung King-Ho 梁勁豪	
2010	Can't Buy Me Love 公主嫁到	Kam Tuo-fuk 金多福	Nominated – Best Supporting Actor; Nominated – My Favourite Male Character
2011	The Other Truth 真相	James Wai Man-hon 衛文翰	
2011	The Fortune Buddies 勁抽福祿壽	Yuen Fuk Cheung 阮福祥	
2011	Super Snoops 荃加福祿壽探案	Kung Duk-lam 恭犢嵐	Nominated – TVB Anniversary Award for My Favourite Male Character (Top 15)
2012	Queens of Diamonds and Hearts 東西宮略	Ngan Ying 晏英	
2012	No Good Either Way 衝呀！瘦薪兵團	Man Ka-wah 閔家華	
2012–2013	Friendly Fire 法網狙擊	Lok Koo-tin 洛古天	
2013	Brother's Keeper 巨輪	Lung Fei 龍飛	
2013	Bounty Lady; My盛Lady	Tung Ting-kiu 董天驕	
2015	12 Golden Ducks; 12金鸭	Leung Lung Yan 梁能仁	
2016	Brother's Keeper II 巨輪II	Lung Fei 龍飛	
2016	Inspector Gourmet 為食神探	Mak Sai 麥犀	
2016	Come with Me 性在有情	Kam Cheung 甘昌	
2017	Heart and Greed 溏心風暴3	Leung Jaan 梁贊	
2017	Destination Nowhere 迷	Lau Chow 劉 秋	

Host

Year	Title	TVB Anniversary Awards
2008–2009	Super Trio Supreme 鐵甲無敵獎門人	Nominated – Best Presenter (2008); Won – Best Presenter (2009)
2009	Brain Wall (Hong Kong version: Hole in the Wall) 大咕窿	
2010	Fun with Liza and Gods 荃加福祿壽	Won – Best Presenter (2010)
2010	The Voice Season 2 超級巨聲2	
2010	Liza and Gods Anniversary Charade 荃加福祿壽玩轉台慶	
2011	What The Face? 變身男女Chok Chok Chok	Nominated – Best Host (2011)
2011	Acts of Gods 福祿壽大假光臨	
2012	Let's Play With Our Food 皆大歡喜之溏心風暴	Nominated – Best Host (2012)
2012	Games Gods Play 萬千升呢福祿壽	Nominated – Best Host (2012)
2018	The Forgotten Valley 平安谷之詭谷傳說	Supporting Role
2021–2022	Dub of War 好聲好戲	

=== Films ===
- I Love You, You're Perfect, Now Change! (2019)
- A Beautiful Moment (2018)
- Meow (2017)
- House of Wolves (2016)

=== Dubbing ===
- Dub of War's Second Season Graduation Project - Spider-Man: No Way Home (2022) - Wong
