= Devil's Disciples =

Hong Kong television series

- Poster
- Genre: Wuxia
- Starring: Bosco Wong; Kevin Cheng; Bernice Liu; Shirley Yeung; Sharon Chan; Wayne Lai
- Opening theme: Keung Kim (強劍) performed by Bosco Wong and Kevin Cheng
- Country of origin: Hong Kong
- Original language: Cantonese
- No. of episodes: 20

Production
- Producer: Lau Kar Ho
- Running time: 45 minutes per episode

Original release
- Network: TVB
- Release: July 9 – August 3, 2007

Devil's Disciples
- Traditional Chinese: 強劍
- Simplified Chinese: 强剑
Transcriptions
Standard Mandarin
- Hanyu Pinyin: Qiáng Jiàn
Yue: Cantonese
- Jyutping: Koeng4 Gim3

Devil's Disciples is a Hong Kong television series released overseas in February 2007 and broadcast locally on TVB Jade in July 2007.

== Synopsis ==
There are two groups of people, the good and evil. Everyone sees the Saint Sword Sect, led by Pak Tong-Ngo (Eddy Ko), as the good, and the Blood Shadow Sect, led by an unknown couple Sze Ma Shing-Wan (Michael Miu) and Mo Yung Koo-Yuet (Anne Heung), as the bad. The Saint Sword Sect tried to get rid of the Blood Shadow Sect and the Blood Shadow Sect broke apart as a result. Before they fought, Sze Ma Shing-Wan and Mo Yung Koo-Yuet had twins, which they used eagles to send them separately elsewhere for safety. After that, Pak Tong-Ngo ruled the Eight Sects.

Twenty years later, Shing Fung (Bosco Wong) and Shing Kung (Johnson Lee) are unrelated brothers. They perform on the street with their mother (Law Koon Lan) as a living. Because of a rich man's celebration for his daughter's wedding, Shing Fung joins the competition to get the lucky peach from the top of a tall scaffold. From then, he met his master (Wayne Lai) and met Pak Tong Chi-Lung (Bernice Liu). As the Saint Sword Sect is looking for new disciples, Shing Fung managed to pass all the trials and got in. He got to know Ging Lui (Kevin Cheng) and both of them became good friends. While in the Saint Sword Sect, Ging Lui looks for his mother.

The Blood Shadow Sect is revived once again, led by Mok Man (Sharon Chan) this time. Pak-Tong Ngo wants one of his disciples to learn and participate in the Big Dipper Array, which is one of the strongest and long lost martial arts in the pugilistic world. With Mok Man’s help, Ging Lui finds his mother. After he found out the truth of his mother's death, Ging Lui left the Saint Sword Sect and fell in love with Mok Man. The Sword Saint Pak-Tong Ngo found out that Shing Fung and Mok Man were siblings, so he used Shing Fung to lure Mok Man to a trap, where he would poison her. Mok Man fell into Pak-Tong Ngo's trap, but Shing Fung arrived to help her. Sword Saint Pak-Tong Ngo was outraged and made up excuses, trying to justify Mok Man's death. Ging Lui then came and taking hostage of Chi-Lung, they managed to escape, running away to meditate and heal Mok Man.

However, no matter how Szeto Shui-Ling (Shirley Yeung) tried, she could not cure Mok Man, unless they sought help from the Unity Clan, where Shui-Ling was born. Shui-Ling's father, the leader of the Unity Clan refused to cure Mok Man because there was a law which prohibited the Unity Clan from treating outsiders, as they did not want to have anything to do with the pugilistic world. So, Shui-Ling decided to marry Shing Fung. First, for the fate of his sister, Mok Man. And, secondly, for her love to Shing Fung. Shui-Ling didn't want to separate Chi-Lung. So, that night, Shui-Ling tricked Shing Fung thinking it was for power, and not wine. He drank the wine and was very drunk. Shui Ling opens her clothes and kisses Shing Fung. And, unwraps Shing Fung's clothing. Shui-Ling's parents found out in the morning and found out they had slept a night. Meanwhile, Pak-Tong Ngo has further evil plans.

== Cast ==
Note: Some of the characters' names are in Cantonese romanisation.

| Cast | Role | Description |
|---|---|---|
| Bosco Wong | Shing Fung/Sze Ma-Fung 成風/司馬風 | Sze Ma-Suet's younger brother. Pak Tong Chi-Lung and Szeto Shui-Ling's lover. Tung Fong Mo-Ngai's student. |
| Kevin Cheng | Ging Lui 荊磊 | Sze Ma-Suet's lover Sze Ma Fung's best friend |
| Bernice Liu | Pak Tong Chi-Lung 北堂紫瓏 | Pak Tong-Ngo's daughter Sze Ma-Fung's ex lover. |
| Shirley Yeung | Szeto Shui-Ling 司徒水靈 | Sze Ma-Fung's lover then wife |
| Wayne Lai | Tung Fong Mo-Ngai 東方無崖 | Sze Ma-Fung's mentor. Killed by Pak Tong-Ngo. |
| Sharon Chan | Mok Man/Sze Ma-Suet 莫問/司馬雪 | Sze Ma-Fung's older sister. Ging Lui's lover. Anti-Villain |
| Eddy Ko | Pak Tong-Ngo 北堂傲 | Saint Sword Sect; Pak Tong Chi-Lung's father. Main Villain |
| Johnson Lee (李思捷) | Shing Kung 成功 | Sze Ma-Fung's step brother. |
| Law Koon Lan (羅冠蘭) | Shing Dai-Leung 成大娘 | Sze Ma-Fung's step mother. Shing Kung's mother. |
| Michael Miu (cameo) | Sze Ma Shing-Wan 司馬星魂 | Blood Shadow Sect; Mo Yung Koo-Yuet's husband. Sze Ma-Suet and Sze Ma-Fung's father. Killed by Pak Tong-Ngo in episode 1 |
| Anne Heung (cameo) | Mo Yung Koo-Yuet 慕容孤月 | Blood Shadow Sect; Sze Ma Shing-Wan's wife. Sze Ma-Suet and Sze Ma-Fung's mother. Killed by Pak Tong-Ngo in episode 1 |

== Reception ==
Viewers complained about the excessive heavy use of CGI graphics on the visuals to exaggerate an already exaggerated fantasy martial arts series. People felt the story had the potential to develop more as many characters were introduced, but they were never properly utilized.

They also felt the story was disorganized and the ending was anticlimactic, as the villain was never defeated, but self detonated as a result of being too powerful. Fans of Dragon Ball Z were surprised when Ging Lui (Kevin Cheng) used Goku's famous Kamehameha wave upon Pak Tong-Ngo. The epilogue of the story was followed by a small comical musical skit that was met with mixed reaction.

== Viewership ratings ==
| | Week | Episode | Average Points | Peaking Points | References |
|---|---|---|---|---|---|
| 1 | July 9–13, 2007 | 1 — 5 | 31 | 35 | |
| 2 | July 16–20, 2007 | 6 — 10 | 29 | 32 | |
| 3 | July 23–27, 2007 | 11 — 15 | 27 | 30 | |
| 4 | July 30 - August 3, 2007 | 16 — 20 | 29 | 32 | |

== Awards and nominations ==
40th TVB Anniversary Awards (2007)

- "Best Drama"
- "Best Actor in a Leading Role" (Kevin Cheng - Ging Lui)
- "Best Actor in a Leading Role" (Bosco Wong - Sze Ma-Fung)
- "Best Actress in a Leading Role" (Sharon Chan - Sze Ma-Suet)
- "Best Actor in a Supporting Role" (Johnson Lee - Shing Kung)
