= Dicey Business =

- DVD cover
- 賭場風雲
- Genre: Modern Drama (Grand Production)
- Starring: Bobby Au-yeung; Michael Miu; Jessica Hsuan; Bosco Wong; Tavia Yeung; Benz Hui; Florence Kwok
- Opening theme: "先賭為快" by Hacken Lee
- Ending theme: "第幾天" by Bosco Wong
- Country of origin: Hong Kong
- Original language: Cantonese
- No. of episodes: 35

Production
- Running time: 45 minutes (approx.)

Original release
- Network: TVB
- Release: November 20, 2006 – January 5, 2007

Dicey Business (Traditional Chinese: 賭場風雲) is a 2006 grand production drama by Television Broadcasts Limited.

== Plot ==
The talented gambling artist, Cheung (齊歡暢) (Bobby Au Yeung), entered a worldwide card playing tournament when he was 18 years old and was regarded as the favorite to win. However, due to the follies of youth, Cheung was seduced by Yan (藍小茵) (Florence Kwok), who was Chor’s (喬正初) (Michael Miu’s) girlfriend, Chor being the other competitor. Due to the distraction, Cheung also became separated from his 3 year old younger brother, Lok (齊歡樂) (Bosco Wong). In the finals tournament, Cheung could not concentrate on his game and forfeited the competition. Ever since then, Cheung was someone with forever bad luck. His life has been turned up-side down. He became a gambling addict.

Fate decided that Cheung was able to bring his life back up and become good friends with him, being united by Wing (周福榮) (Benz Hui), and becoming the best of friends working in a casino, "Onisac". Chor works as the casino's CEO, Wing as the commissioner of the bodyguards, while Cheung works as the caretaker for the garden.

One night, Wan (李青雲) (Jessica Hsuan) stays at the casino, trying to win money. She stays at the casino for days, without sleeping. She become the gamble for Chor and Cheung. (Cheung needs to go back to Hong Kong to visit his parents, but he's scared for he lost his brother and feels too ashamed to face them). The gamble is that Chor thinks Wan will leave the casino, but Cheung thinks otherwise, acknowledging the fact that Wan stays overnight. If Cheung loses, he has to go back to Hong Kong. Cheung loses and goes back to Hong Kong that day, but is surprised to see Wan on the plane. Wan is being called by loan sharks and she sells his phone to Cheung to get money. Once they arrive, Cheung asks Wan to bring him to Mong Kok, where he lived before he left. At Mong Kok, Wan steals all of Chueng's money to pay off all the debts she owes, repaying him by letting him rent out the apartment next door, owned by Wan. Inside the apartment, Cheung finds several bags of garbage and junk, and Cheung Lai Fu (張來富), a 23-year-old guy, who is afraid of the outside world, refusing to go outside alone, let alone him leave his blanket. Wan takes care of him because her grand-aunt told her so before she died.

Through fateful events, Cheung finds out that Fu is his brother and he was kicked around like a ball, sold to America, then China, and he was severely wounded in the shoulder by a blade his "master" was wielding for unable to obtain money when Fu was out as a beggar. Cheung, finding his brother a social outcast, encourages him to become more open. Fu is scared and runs away. Fatefully, he meets Chor, and Chor gives him a makeover, so Fu can look decent. Chor teaches him that if you don't want to be stared at, stare at the person who is glaring at you, and demonstrates by making a couple leave just by staring at them. Chor soon becomes Fu's idol. Chor informs Cheung that Fu is at his residence and Fu goes back home.

Cheung is busy, and asks Wan to take care of Fu. But unfortunately, Wan and her friend take Fu to a gambling den, and they find out that Fu has the uncanny ability to memorize all the 52 cards' order, just by watching the dealer shuffle. Soon, everyone becomes entangled with personal problems: Cheung trying to lead Fu in the right way and getting his "good luck" back. Chor cheats in a gamble, which is being taped. He has to conform to bad people by secretly stealing Onisac's money, soon being consumed by greed. Wan, deciding who to fall in love with: Cheung or Chor. Fu, struggling to go from a dealer to CEO (trying to be just like Chor), and learning how to gamble properly. And finally, Wing, who wants to reunite Chor (whom he calls Honey) and Cheung (whom he calls Baby), after Chor framed Cheung.

== Cast ==
Cast	Role	Description
Bobby Au-yeung	Chai Foon-Cheung 齊歡暢	Gardener/Card Player; Chai Foon-Lok's older brother. Kiu Ching-Chor and Chow Fook-Wing's friend. Li Ching-Wan's lover.
Michael Miu	Kiu Ching-Chor 喬正初	Onisac Casino CEO; Chai Foon-Lok and Chow Fook-Wing's friend. Li Ching-Wan's ex-boyfriend.
Jessica Hsuan	Li Ching-Wan 李青雲	Gambler; Tam Chu-Mei's cousin. Kiu Ching-Chor's ex-girlfriend. Chai Foon-Cheung's lover.
Bosco Wong	Chai Foon-Lok/Cheung Lor-Fu 齊歡樂/張來富	Dealer; Chai Foon-Cheung's younger brother. Tam Chu-Mei's lover.
Tavia Yeung	Tam Chu-Mei (Mimi) 譚珠美	Model/Dealer; Li Ching-Wan's cousin. Chai Foon-Lok's lover.
Benz Hui	Chow Fook-Wing 周福榮	Kiu Ching-Chor and Chai Foon-Cheung's friend.
Florence Kwok	Lam Siu-Yan 藍小茵	Kiu Ching-Chor's ex-girlfriend.
Samuel Kwok (郭峰)	Ko Ming 高名	Ex-Convict
Law Lok Lam (羅樂林)	Yung Hon-Cheung 翁漢昌	Onisac Casino Owner; Yung Chi-Wai's father.
Eric Li (李天翔)	Yung Chi-Wai 翁子維	Yung Hon-Cheung's son.
Eileen Yeow	Shek Yuen-Ying 石婉瑩	Li Ching-Wan's friend.

== Viewership ratings ==
	Week	Episode	Average Points	Peaking Points	References
1	November 20–24, 2006	1 — 5	30	32	
2	November 27 - December 1, 2006	6 — 10	32	34	
3	December 4–8, 2006	11 — 15	30	—	
4	December 11–15, 2006	16 — 20	31	—	
5	December 18–22, 2006	21 — 25	29	—	
6	December 25–29, 2006	26 — 30	30	—	
7	January 1–5, 2007	31 — 35	34	37^{a}	

^{a} Last episode peaked at 40 points within the last 15 minutes of the episode.

== Awards and nominations ==
=== Awards ===
Next Magazine TV Awards (2007)

- "Top 10 Best TV Program" - #2
- "Top 10 Best TV Artists" - Jessica Hsuan - #2
- "Top 10 Best TV Artists" - Bosco Wong - #6

=== Nominations ===
International Emmy (2007)

- "Best Performance by an Actor" (Bobby Au-yeung - Chai Foon-Cheung) (Top 3)

40th TVB Anniversary Awards (2007)

- "Best Drama" (Top 3)
- "Best Actor in a Leading Role" (Bobby Au-yeung - Chai Foon-Cheung) (Top 5)
- "Best Actress in a Leading Role" (Jessica Hsuan - Li Ching Wan) (Top 5)
- "Best Actress in a Leading Role" (Tavia Yeung - Mimi Tam Chu-Mei)
- "My Favourite Male Character Role" (Bosco Wong - Chai Foon-Lok/Cheung Lor-Fu)
- "My Favourite Female Character Role" (Jessica Hsuan - Li Ching Wan)
- "My Favourite Female Character Role" (Tavia Yeung - Mimi Tam Chu-Mei)
- "Best Actor in a Supporting Role" (Benz Hui - Chow Fook-Wing) (Top 5)
- "Mainland Most Popular TVB Male Artist" (Bobby Au-yeung) (Top 5)
- "Mainland Most Popular TVB Male Artist" (Michael Miu)
- "Mainland Most Popular TVB Male Artist" (Bosco Wong) (Top 5)
- "Mainland Most Popular TVB Female Artist" (Jessica Hsuan) (Top 5)
- "Mainland Most Popular TVB Female Artist" (Tavia Yeung)
- "Most Improved Actor" (Stephen Huynh) (Top 5)
