= Amy Wong (producer) =

Hong Kong producer

Amy Wong (Chinese: 王心慰) is a Hong Kong television drama producer. She worked for RTV and ATV before moving to TVB in 1989. Wong is known for her collaborations with Kevin Cheng and Ruco Chan, in which her productions have boosted both actors to stardom.

== Filmography ==
As director
| Year | English title | Chinese title | Notes |
|---|---|---|---|
| 1978 | Crocodile Tears | 鱷魚淚 | |
| 1979 | Enigma | 奇女子 | |
| 1979 | Reincarnated | 天蠶變 | |
| 1980 | Gone with the Wind | 浮生六劫 | |
| 1980 | Fatherland | 大地恩情 | |
| 1981 | I Accuse | 大控訴 | |
| 1981 | I.Q. 100 | IQ成熟時 | |
| 1982 | The Spirit of the Sword | 浣花洗劍錄 | |
| 1984 | I Love Mermaid | 我愛美人魚 | |
| 1984 | 101 Citizen Arrest | 101拘捕令 | |

As producer
| Year | English title | Chinese title | Notes |
|---|---|---|---|
| 1984 | Wong Chao Chun | 王昭君 | |
| 1985 | Chronicles of the Shadow Swordsman | 萍蹤俠影錄 | |
| 1985 | Stardust Memories | 阮玲玉 | |
| 1986 | The Super Swordslady | 越女劍 | |
| 1986 | The Romance of the White Hair Maiden | 白髮魔女傳 | |
| 1986 | Condor in September | 九月鷹飛 | |
| 1987 | | 佳人有難 | |
| 1987 | | 天橋 | |
| 1988 | Those Famous Women in Chinese History | 歷代奇女子 | |
| 1990 | Let It Be Me | 亞二一族 | |
| 1990 | Friends and Lovers | 又是冤家又聚頭 | |
| 1991 | A Way of Justice | 人海驕陽 | |
| 1992 | The Change of Time | 龍的天空 | |
| 1993 | Romance Beyond | 都市的童話 | |
| 1994 | Conscience | 第三類法庭 | |
| 1994 | Sharp Shooters | 廉政英雌 | |
| 1995 | The Trail of Love | 前世冤家 | |
| 1996 | Food of Love | 闔府統請 | |
| 1998 | Before Dawn | 愛在暴風的日子 | |
| 1998 | Burning Flame | 烈火雄心 | Asian Television Award for Best Drama Series; Next TV Award for Top 10 TV Programmes (#4); Nominated — TVB Anniversary Award for Best Actor (Wong He at Top 5); Nominated — TVB Anniversary Award for Best Actress (Esther Kwan at Top 5) |
| 1999 | A Matter of Business | 千里姻緣兜錯圈 | |
| 1999 | Face to Face | 雙面伊人 | |
| 2000 | Ups and Downs | 無業樓民 | |
| 2001 | On the Track or Off | 勇往直前 | |
| 2002 | Burning Flame II | 烈火雄心II | Next TV Award for Top 10 TV Programmes (#3) |
| 2002 | Slim Chances | 我要Fit一Fit | |
| 2003 | Back to Square One | 撲水冤家 | |
| 2004 | Hard Fate | 翡翠戀曲 | |
| 2005 | My Family | 甜孫爺爺 | Nominated — TVB Anniversary Award for Best Drama (Top 5); Nominated — TVB Anniversary Award for Best Actor (Chung King-fai at Top 5) |
| 2005 | Food for Life | Yummy Yummy | |
| 2006 | Under the Canopy of Love | 天幕下的戀人 | Next TV Award for Top 10 TV Programmes (#9); TVB Anniversary Award for Best Actor (Kevin Cheng); Nominated — TVB Anniversary Award for My Favourite Female Character (Niki Chow at Top 5) |
| 2007 | The Ultimate Crime Fighter | 通天幹探 | Next TV Award for Top 10 TV Programmes (#9); Nominated — TVB Anniversary Award for My Favourite Female Character (Gigi Lai at Top 5) |
| 2008 | The Seventh Day | 最美麗的第七天 | |
| 2008 | Last One Standing | 與敵同行 | Next TV Award for Top 10 TV Programmes (#10); Nominated — TVB Anniversary Award for Best Actor (Kevin Cheng at Top 5) |
| 2009 | Burning Flame III | 烈火雄心3 | Next TV Award for Top 10 TV Programmes (#6); Nominated — TVB Anniversary Award for Best Drama (Top 5); Nominated — TVB Anniversary Award for Best Actor (Bosco Wong at Top 5) |
| 2009 | The Stew of Life | 有營煮婦 | Nominated — TVB Anniversary Award for Best Drama (Top 20) Nominated — TVB Anniversary Award for Best Actress (Louise Lee; Top 15) Nominated — TVB Anniversary Award for Best Supporting Actor ( Evergreen Mak; Top 15) Nominated — TVB Anniversary Award for Best Supporting Actress ( Christine Ng; Top 15) Nominated — TVB Anniversary Award for Best Supporting Actress ( Fala Chan; Top 5) Nominated — TVB Anniversary Award for Most Improved Male Artiste ( Johnson Lee; Top 15) Nominated — TVB Anniversary Award for My Favourite Female Character ( Louise Lee, Christine Ng, & Fala Chan; Top 15) |
| 2011 | Only You | Only You 只有您 | Nominated — TVB Anniversary Award for Best Drama (Top 24) Nominated — TVB Anniversary Award for Best Actress (Louise Lee, Yoyo Mung; Top 15) Nominated — TVB Anniversary Award for My Favourite Female Character ( Louise Lee, Yoyo Mung; Top 15) Nominated — TVB Anniversary Award for Most Improved Male Artiste (Jason Chan, Matt Yeung; Top 15) |
| 2011 | The Other Truth | 真相 | Next TV Award for Top 10 TV Programmes (#4); Nominated — TVB Anniversary Award for Best Drama (Top 5); Nominated — TVB Anniversary Award for Best Supporting Actress (Aimee Chan, Natalie Tong, and Helen Ma at Top 5); Nominated — TVB Anniversary Award for My Favourite Male Character (Ruco Chan at Top 5) |
| 2012 | No Good Either Way | 衝呀！瘦薪兵團 | Nominated — TVB Anniversary Award for Most Improved Female Artiste (Katy Kung) |
| 2013 | Brother's Keeper | 巨輪 | TVB Anniversary Award for Best Actress (Kristal Tin); Nominated — TVB Anniversary Award for Best Drama (Top 5); Nominated — TVB Anniversary Award for Best Actor (Ruco Chan at Top 5); Nominated — TVB Anniversary Award for Best Actress (Linda Chung at Top 5); Nominated — TVB Anniversary Award for My Favourite Female Character (Linda Chung at Top 5); Nominated — TVB Anniversary Award for Most Improved Male Artiste (Edwin Siu) |
| 2014 | Ruse of Engagement | 叛逃 | Starhub TVB Award for My Favourite TVB Actor (Ruco Chan) |
| 2014 | Black Heart White Soul | 忠奸人 | TVB Anniversary Award for Best Actor (Roger Kwok); TVB Star Awards Malaysia for My Favourite TVB Actor in a Leading Role (Roger Kwok); TVB Star Awards Malaysia for My Favourite Top 15 TVB Drama Characters (Roger Kwok) |
| 2015 | Lord of Shanghai | 梟雄 | TVB Anniversary Award for Best Drama; TVB Anniversary Award for Best Actor (Anthony Wong); TVB Anniversary Award for Best Supporting Actor (Willie Wai); 2015 TVB Star Awards Malaysia for My Favourite Top 16 TVB Drama Characters (Wayne Lai) |
| 2016 | Brother's Keeper II | 巨輪II | |
| 2017 | Destination Nowhere | 迷 | |
| 2018 | Daddy Cool | 逆缘 | |
| 2020 | Of Greed And Ants | 黄金有罪 | |
| 2021 | The Forgotten Day | 失忆24小时 | |
| 2021 | The Kwoks And What | 我家无难事 | |

== Frequent casting ==
- Yvonne Ho – My Family, Under the Canopy of Love, The Seventh Day, The Ultimate Crime Fighter, Last One Standing, Burning Flame III, The Stew of Life, Only You, Last One Standing, No Good Either Way, Brother's Keeper
- Kevin Cheng – Hard Fate, Yummy Yummy, Under the Canopy of Love, The Ultimate Crime Fighter, The Seventh Day, Last One Standing, Burning Flame III, Only You
- Ruco Chan – Burning Flame III, Only You, The Other Truth, No Good Either Way, Ruse of Engagement, Brother's Keeper
- Frankie Lam – The Change of Time, Romance Beyond, Before Dawn, On the Track or Off
- Wong He – Food of Love, Burning Flame, Burning Flame II, Burning Flame III
- Yoyo Mung – The Ultimate Crime Fighter, Last One Standing, Only You, Ruse of Engagement
- Niki Chow – Hard Fate, Under the Canopy of Love, The Seventh Day
- Kristal Tin – Only You, The Other Truth, No Good Either Way, Brother's Keeper
- Louise Lee – The Stew of Life, Only You, The Other Truth, Ruse of Engagement, Brother's Keeper
- Louis Yuen – The Other Truth, No Good Either Way, Brother's Keeper
