= Gill Mohindepaul Singh =

Hong Kong actor

Gill Mohindpaul Singh
- Born: 23 April 1970 (age 56); Hong Kong
- Other names: Q Bobo; Kiu Bo Law
- Occupation: Actor
- Years active: 2005–present
- Spouse: Gurinder Kaur Gill

Chinese name
- Traditional Chinese: 喬保羅
- Simplified Chinese: 乔保罗
Transcriptions
Standard Mandarin
- Hanyu Pinyin: Qiáo Bǎoluó
Yue: Cantonese
- Yale Romanization: Kiu^{4} Bou^{2}-lo^{4}
- Jyutping: Kìu Bóulò

Stage name
- Traditional Chinese: 喬寶寶
- Simplified Chinese: 乔宝宝
Transcriptions
Standard Mandarin
- Hanyu Pinyin: Qiáo Bǎobǎo
Yue: Cantonese
- Yale Romanization: Kìu Bóubóu
- Jyutping: Kiu^{4} Bou^{2}-bou^{2}

Gill Mohindepaul Singh (Chinese: 喬保羅; Cantonese Yale: Kìu Bóulò), better known by his Chinese stage name Q Bobo (Chinese: 喬寶寶; Cantonese Yale: Kìu Bóubóu; sometimes also spelled Qbobo), is a Hong Kong actor working under TVB. He is fluent in Punjabi (mother tongue), Cantonese, English and Mandarin, despite his inability to read and write in Chinese. He is of South Asian descent.

== Career ==
Singh became an actor for TVB after participating in the TVB game show Minutes to Fame hosted by Hacken Lee and Joey Leung. He worked for the Correctional Services Department before becoming an actor.

The first Indian actor signed by TVB, Gill played one of the regular cast on the TVB sitcom Welcome to the House. In an in-depth interview with Muse magazine in 2007, Singh discusses his cultural identity and confesses to seeing himself "like an ambassador for my people".

In July 2012, after the Immigration Department notified that his wife's February 2011 application for naturalisation as a Hong Kong citizen had been rejected, he announced that he would depart from the Hong Kong entertainment industry and emigrate to Scotland. Singh left Hong Kong early 2013 and would not return until 2019, where he began acting for TVB again. As of 2021, Singh has moved back to Scotland to be with his family, as his eldest son was having a child.

== Personal life ==
Singh married his wife in 1988. He had two sons and two grandchildren, the son and daughter of his eldest son.

== Filmography ==
=== TV series ===
Year	Title	Role	Notes
2006	Welcome to the House	Henry Law	
2006	Maidens' Vow	Ah Sing	
2006	Glittering Days	Robinson	
2006	Dicey Business	Casino customer	
2006	The Price of Greed	Robinson	
2007	Best Bet	Doctor Kam Bo	
2007-2008	Best Selling Secrets	Kiu Kwok Bo	
2007	On the First Beat	Indian crime reporter	
2007	Fathers and Sons	Mr. Ajit	
2007	Word Twisters' Adventures	Mr. Mo	
2008	Wasabi Mon Amour	Chef	
2008	Catch Me Now	Curry restaurant owner	
2009	The Stew of Life	Henry Ha	
2009	D.I.E. Again	Kiu Tak Lee	
2009	Born Rich	Robin	Ep. 16 & 17
2009	A Chip Off the Old Block	U.S. empire state building security	Ep. 19
2009	Off Pedder	"Kam Po Mini Granary" commercial model	
2010	In the Eye of the Beholder		Ep. 17
2010	When Lanes Merge	store owner	Ep. 12
2010	Some Day	Indian chef	Ep. 70
2010	The Comeback Clan	Foreigner	Ep. 3
2011	7 Days in Life	Vikas Ali	
2011	Only You	Mr. Gill	
2011	Ghetto Justice	Neighbor	
2011	The Other Truth	Barrister Gill	Ep. 9 & 10
2011	Men with No Shadows	Medical researcher	
2011	Super Snoops	Landlord	
2011	Be Home for Dinner	Uncle Yee Wan	
2012	No Good Either Way	Interpal Singh / Indian Panther / Shing Siu-lung	
2012	Tiger Cubs	Terrorist	Ep. 13
2012	Ghetto Justice II	Uncle Chiu	
2012	Silver Spoon, Sterling Shackles	Barrister Gill	
2013	Season of Love	Director Paul	Ep. 04
2013	Brother's Keeper	Santos	Ep. 19 & 20
2014	Ruse of Engagement	Gadin Patel	Ep. 01 & 02
2015	Captain of Destiny		
2017	Line Walker: The Prelude	Yu Lok Sing	
2025	Homeland Guardian	Shiva [Gangster]	

=== Films ===
Year	Title	Role
2005	Kung Fu Mahjong 2	Ching Yat Sing
2006	Rob-B-Hood	Hairy
2006	McDull, the Alumni	Folk Song restaurant waiter
2007	The Lady Iron Chef	Kidnapper
2008	Moss	Ah Sing
2009	All's Well, Ends Well 2009	L's chauffeur
2009	I Corrupt All Cops	Prisoner
2010	72 Tenants of Prosperity	
2010	Crossing Hennessy	Mysterious Indian guy who appears in Ah Loy's dreams
2011	The 33D Invader	
2012	I Love Hong Kong 2012	
2015	Helios	Saad
2016	The Gigolo 2	Uncle Chiu
2019	Walk with Me	
2019	The White Storm 2: Drug Lords	Abbas Abraham

== See also ==
- Vivek Mahbubani
