= Mat Yeung =

Hong Kong TV actor and host

Mat Yeung 陽明
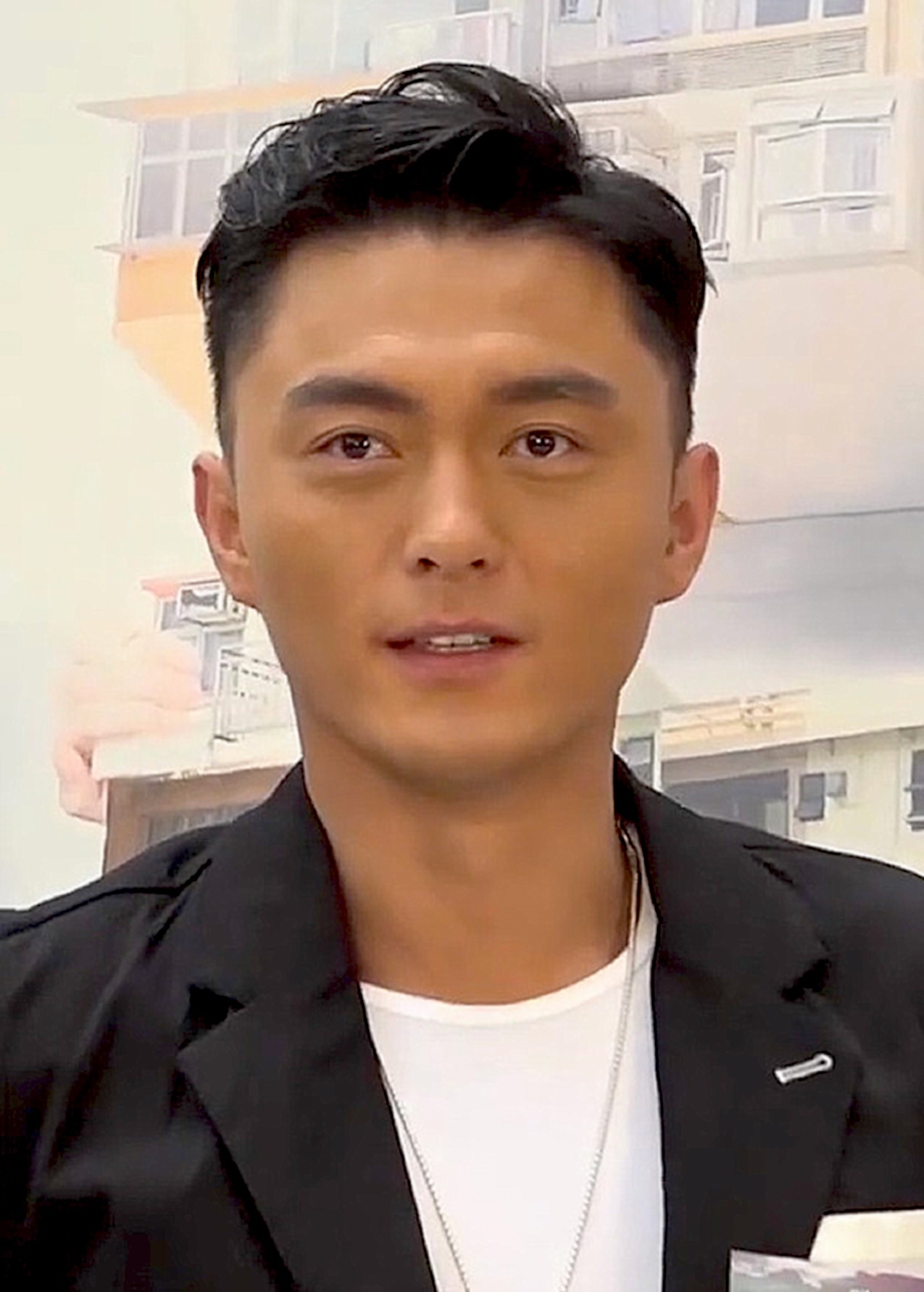
- Yeung in 2019
- Born: Lam Ming-lok (林明樂); British Hong Kong
- Occupations: Actor; television host; businessman
- Years active: 1999–present
- Spouse: Lisa Ch'ng (m. 2026)
- Partner(s): Sharon Chan, Chloe Nguyen, Lisa Ch'ng
- Awards: TVB Anniversary Awards – Most Improved Male Artiste; 2017 My Dearly Sinful Mind, Bet Hur, Love and Construction & All Work No Pay Holidays Sr.2

Chinese name
- Traditional Chinese: 楊明
- Simplified Chinese: 杨明
Transcriptions
Standard Mandarin
- Hanyu Pinyin: Yáng Míng
Yue: Cantonese
- Yale Romanization: Yèung Mìng
- Jyutping: Joeng4 Ming4

Mat Yeung Ming is a Hong Kong television actor and host known for his roles as Lui Ting in Screen Play (2000), as Wan Po-yu in The 'W' Files (2003), as Tin Hoi in Be Home for Dinner (2011), and as Senior Inspector Jasper Kong in Master of Play (2012).

== Career ==
In September 1998, Yeung signed a management contract with TVB after graduating from the company's 17th Artiste Training Class. He was given his first major role in the comedy-drama serial Screen Play (2000), where he portrayed Lui Ting, a character based on Nicholas Tse. Yeung was pushed by his company to compete in the male beauty pageant Mister World in 2000, and was misplaced. Yeung returned to Hong Kong and played a few more minor roles afterwards, before winning another major role in the teen drama Aqua Heroes and mystery/adventure drama The 'W' Files, both which aired in 2003.

In 2005, his career was interrupted when Yeung was arrested for DUI and criminal damage. He was sentenced to 150 hours of community service, and became the first TVB actor having to retake acting classes again. To make ends meet, Yeung opened a clothing retail store in Mong Kok during 2006, but the store closed down within a year of business. He tried another business with selling Chinese mitten crab, but the business went bankrupt within three months. In 2018, Yeung returned to the food business by opening up stew soup shops, stating that acting income is often unstable and would be actively participating to help. However due to the COVID-19 pandemic, Yeung had to shut down all his shops and revert to takeaway and online sales by 2022.

In 2011, Yeung's career was revived after a successful portrayal of Tin Hoi in the sitcom Be Home for Dinner. He was nominated for Most Improved Male Artiste at the 2011 TVB Anniversary Awards. He eventually won this award in 2017. Yeung got his first male leading role in the 2019 drama My Commissioned Lover.

== Criminal history ==
In 2005, Yeung was arrested for DUI and criminal damage. He was sentenced to 150 hours of community service.

In August 2020, Yeung was arrested for his involvement in a car collision, after refusing to provide a blood sample to the police when they noted the smell of alcohol in his breath. Yeung's ongoing promotional campaigns for the Hong Kong Police Force were suspended after his arrest. He won a last-minute bid for freedom after a magistrate decided to remand him in custody over two driving offences, only to later allow him to reverse his guilty plea on the grounds that he had received “improper” legal advice.

In November 2021, he was found guilty of all three charges and sentenced to 18 days in prison. During the trial, it was also mentioned that Yeung in a separate incident had been fined for using his mobile phone while driving.

In September 2022, judge Johnny Chan Jong-herng told Yeung that evidence for his careless driving charge was "rock-solid". Yeung was released on bail for HK$100,000 and ordered to not leave Hong Kong, to report to the police every Wednesday, and to not drive while on bail. A traffic cop at the scene and medical report showed that Yeung committed drunk driving.

In December 2022, Yeung lost his appeal, and the judge found Yeung only have "average" levels of remorse, said Yeung's plea was "capricious," and also said evidence against Yeung was "ironclad."

== Political views ==
Yeung is a staunch supporter of the pro-Beijing camp, being very outspoken among the entertainment industry.

Yeung has a critical stance on the protest, as he has urged people to disassociate themselves from the violence and voice their support for police officers. Due to his position on the protests, protesters have targeted him, which has led to boycotts of television shows he has starred in and his shops across Hong Kong. Conversely, he remarked: "Whether the business is good or not doesn't bother me, but I am very sad that rioters became more and more violent in streets and more common people got hurt." He further explained that: "At this time, business is not that important anymore. Now it's the struggle for humanity that matters, we must return to humanity. I feel that in the past months, humanity is lost in Hong Kong."

During the protests, Yeung was discovered insulting the protesters in a WhatsApp group with foul language, "All guys are fxxking crazy" (佢老味成班癲X咗). Yeung was criticised by Flow Leung, another TVB artist, who claimed that two TVB staff left the group chat in anger and felt that Yeung went overboard when laughing at the two leaving the group chat. Yeung claimed he has made no judgement on peaceful protesters and criticized Leung for quoting him out of context.

Yeung, who is well known for playing police figures, commented: "I can see our selfless police officers work so hard to protect us. However, some people kept smearing them and cooking up fake news to mislead the public." During the protests in November 2019, Yeung was helping the police in clearing roadblocks established by the protesters.

Yeung signed a petition in support of the national security law.

== Filmography ==
Television dramas
Year	Title	Role	Notes
1999	Face to Face	extra	
1999	A Kindred Spirit	extra	Sitcom
1999	Dragon Love	extra	
1999	At the Threshold of an Era	extra	
1999	Witness to a Prosecution	extra	
2000	War of the Genders	extra	Sitcom
2000	Ups and Downs	extra	
2000	The Threat of Love	extra	
2000	Armed Reaction II	extra	
2000	Street Fighters	extra	
2000	Incurable Traits	extra	
2000	A Matter of Customs	extra	
2000	Screen Play	Lui Ting	
2000	Crimson Sabre	extra	
2001	Armed Reaction III		
2001	Seven Sisters		
2002	Family Man		
2002	The Trust of a Lifetime		
2003	Back to Square One		
2003	Aqua Heroes	Sam Kong Koon-kit	
2003	The 'W' Files	Wan Po-yu	
2004	A Handful of Love	Calvin	
2004	To Get Unstuck in Time	Ko Ming	
2004	Shades of Truth	Leung Ka-lok (Happy Jai)	
2005	The Academy	Chan Ling-ling's boyfriend	
2005	Women on the Run	Ching Jun	
2005	Face to Fate	Chor Man-kung	
2005	Healing Hands III	Ko Lok	
2005	Forensic Heroes	Frankie Mok Cheuk-ho	
2007	Ten Brothers	Long Legs Seven	Previously warehoused; released overseas in 2005
2007	The Ultimate Crime Fighter	Ken	
2007	Best Selling Secrets	Don	Episode 55
2008	Catch Me Now	Cheng Wai-shing	2 episodes (Eps. 13–14)
2008	The Silver Chamber of Sorrows	Sheung Sai-cho	
2008	Last One Standing	Motel owner	
2008	The Money-Maker Recipe	Szeto Hiu-kwong	
2008	Moonlight Resonance	Jimmy Wong Hiu-lung	
2008	The Four	Soldier	cameo
2008-2009	The Gem of Life	Oscar	
2009	Just Love II	Lee King-ho	4 episodes
2009	E.U.	Kwok King-cheung	
2009	The Winter Melon Tale	Prince	
2010	In the Eye of the Beholder	Ha Hau-yung	
2010	Fly with Me	Danny Yung Man-lai	
2010	Some Day	Sin Pok	Sitcom recurring
2010	A Pillow Case of Mystery II	Chik Ming-yin	
2010	Beauty Knows No Pain	Owen	
2010	The Comeback Clan	Chung Ching (Eight)	
2010	Twilight Investigation	Sean Wong Chun-fung	Nominated — TVB Anniversary Award for Most Improved Male Artiste
2011	Only You	Keegan	Nominated — TVB Anniversary Award for Most Improved Male Artiste
2011	Love and Again	Ying Fung	Previously warehoused; released overseas in 2004
2011	Be Home for Dinner	Tin Hoi	Sitcom regular Nominated — TVB Anniversary Award for Most Improved Male Artiste
2011	My Sister of Eternal Flower	Koo Suk-lam	Nominated — TVB Anniversary Award for Most Improved Male Artiste
2011	The Other Truth	Ben Wong Chi-nam	4 episodes (Eps. 14–19); Nominated — TVB Anniversary Award for Most Improved Male Artiste
2012	Daddy Good Deeds	Peter	cameo
2012	Master of Play	Senior Inspector Jasper Kong Sing-yu	
2012	No Good Either Way	Jacky Ho Ching-chik	
2012	The Last Steep Ascent	Ngai Po-law	
2012-2013	Missing You	Marcus Lo Yin-pan	
2013	The Day of Days	Wang Tsan-bong	
2013	Season of Love	Hinson Dai Yu-hin	Episodes 1–5: "Chapter of Spring"
2013	Slow Boat Home	Chan Moon-kei	
2013	Karma Rider	Ching Ying-hung	
2014	Outbound Love	Ching Chin-bok	
2014	Storm in a Cocoon	Hung Chuk-gau	
2014	Black Heart White Soul	Lau Yim	
2014	Shades of Life	Kwong Chi Hung	Episode 12
2015	Madam Cutie On Duty	Brother Chang Han	
2015	Momentary Lapse Of Reason	Sam Yat Yin	
2015	Every Step You Take		cameo
2015	Captain of Destiny	Sam Ching Sum	
2015	Lord of Shanghai		
2015-2016	The Executioner	Chek Tsz-chau	
2016	My Dangerous Mafia Retirement Plan	Liu Shau-Kay	
2016	Brother's Keeper II	Luck	
2017	My Dearly Sinful Mind	Tong Yat (Day)	Won - TVB Anniversary Award for Most Improved Male Artiste
2018	Apple-colada	Wong Yau-choi	
2018	Fist Fight	Ha Tin Hang (Leo)	
2019	The Defected	Yau Lai-kit (Mat)	
2019	Police Tactical Unit 2019	Ting Jin-bo	
2019	My Commissioned Lover	Long Chiu-yong (Gus)	Nominated - TVB Anniversary Award for Best Actor
2020	Airport Strikers	Ma Yong-yee (Easy)	Nominated - TVB Anniversary Award for Best Actor
2020	The Exorcist’s 2nd Meter	Moses	cameo (episodes 19-20)
2020	On-Lie Game	Szeto Chung (Sunny)	
2020	Line Walker: Bull Fight	Foot massage customer	cameo (episode 27)
2021	Shadow of Justice	Chun Wing-hei	Nominated - TVB Anniversary Award for Best Actor; Nominated — TVB Anniversary Award for Favourite TVB Actor in Malaysia
2021	Sinister Beings	Kwok Ho	Nominated - TVB Anniversary Award for Best Supporting Actor
2021	The Kwoks And What	Kwok Tak-ming (Derek)	Nominated - TVB Anniversary Award for Best Actor; Nominated - TVB Anniversary Award for Most Popular Onscreen Partnership (with Nina Paw, Joe Ma, Stephanie Che and Fei Wu); Nominated — TVB Anniversary Award for Favourite TVB Actor in Malaysia
2023	Night Beauties	Cheuk Chi-fei	Nominated - TVB Anniversary Award for Best Actor
2024	Darkside of the Moon	Chu Pak-chung	
