= TVB Anniversary Award for Most Improved Male Artiste =

Hong Kong television award

- Awarded for: "Most Improved Performance by a Male Artiste"
- Country: Hong Kong
- Presented by: Television Broadcasts Limited (TVB)
- First award: 1998
- Currently held by: Ricco Ng (2022)
- Website: http://birthday.tvb.com/

The TVB Anniversary Award for Most Improved Male Artiste is one of the TVB Anniversary Awards presented annually by Television Broadcasts Limited (TVB) to recognize a male artiste who has delivered improving performances in Hong Kong television dramas or variety shows throughout the designated year.

The Most Improved Award was first introduced in 1998. It was separated into two categories—Most Improved On-screen Performance Award—Drama (螢幕大躍進獎—戲劇組) and Most Improved On-screen Performance Award—Non-drama (螢幕大躍進獎—非戲劇組), to individually recognize actors and variety presenters. The award was re-established in 2002, changing its name to My Favourite Most Improved Male Artiste of the Year (本年度我最喜愛的飛躍進步男藝員). In 2005, the name was changed to Most Improved Male Artiste (飛躍進步男藝員).

== Winners and nominees ==
Table key
†	Indicates the winner

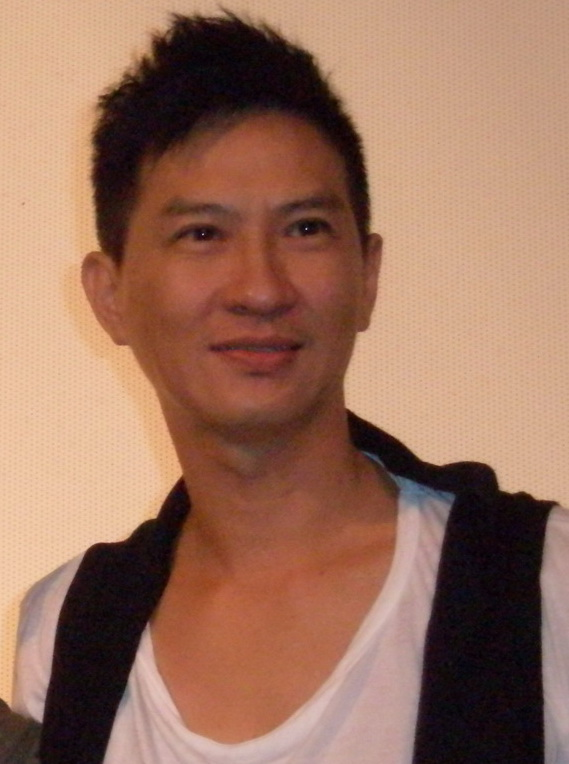
Nick Cheung won TVB's first Most Improved Artiste award for his performance in Secret of the Heart in 1998.

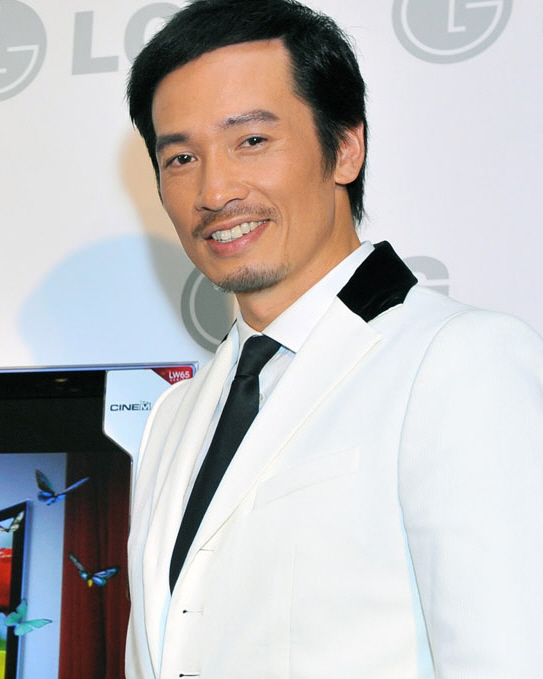
Moses Chan won in 2002 for his performance in Where the Legend Begins.

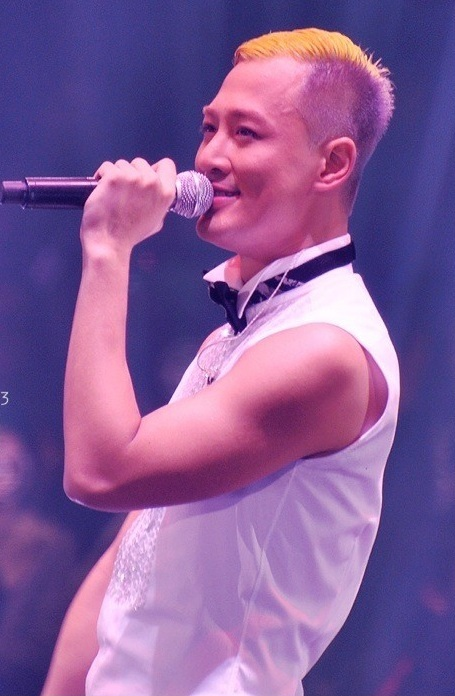
Raymond Lam won in 2003 for his performance in Survivor's Law.

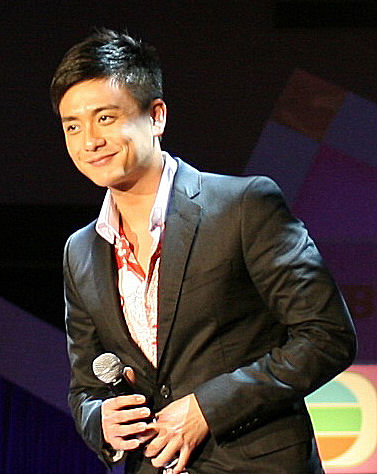
Bosco Wong won in 2005 for his performance in Wars of In-Laws.

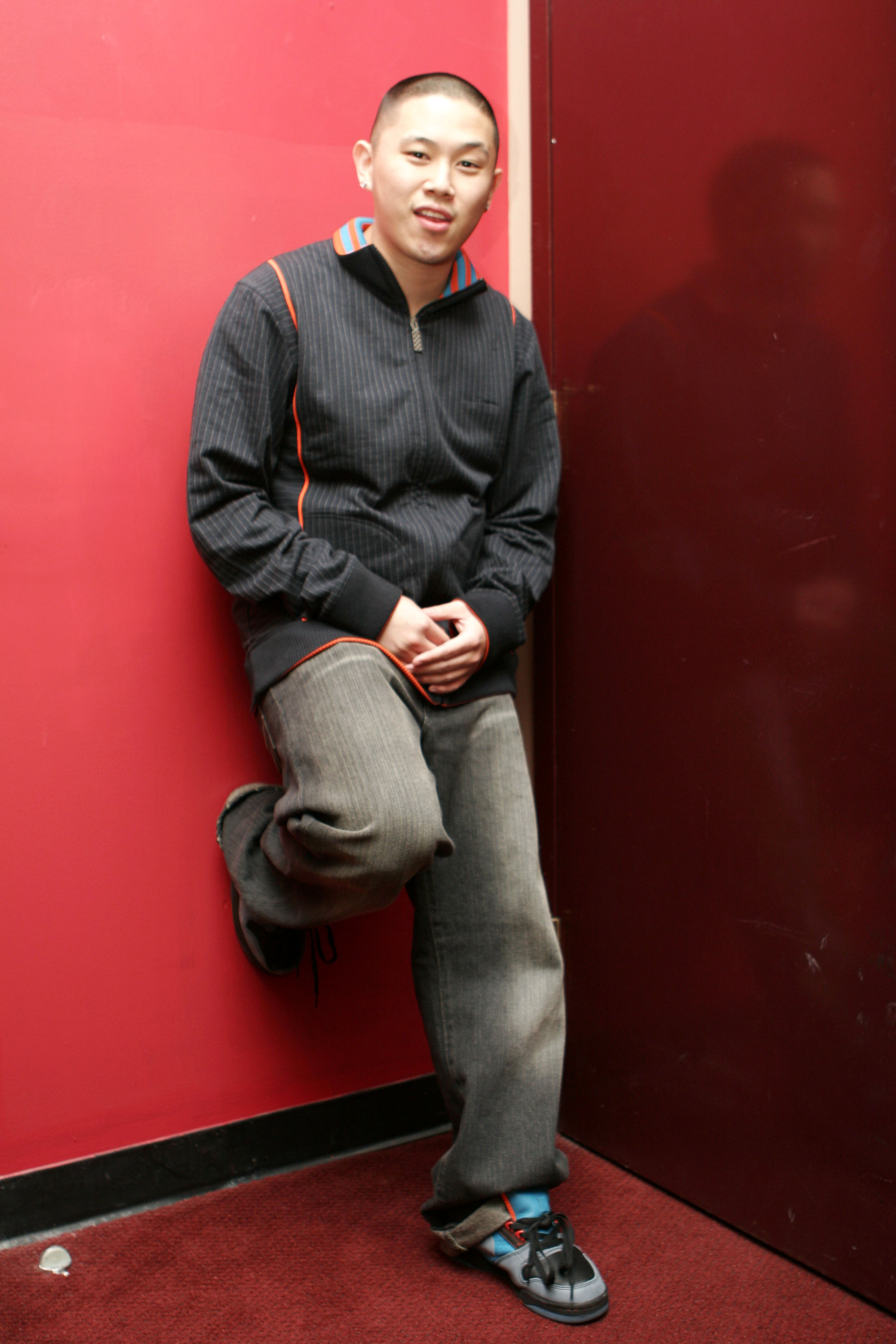
Jin Au-yeung won in 2011.

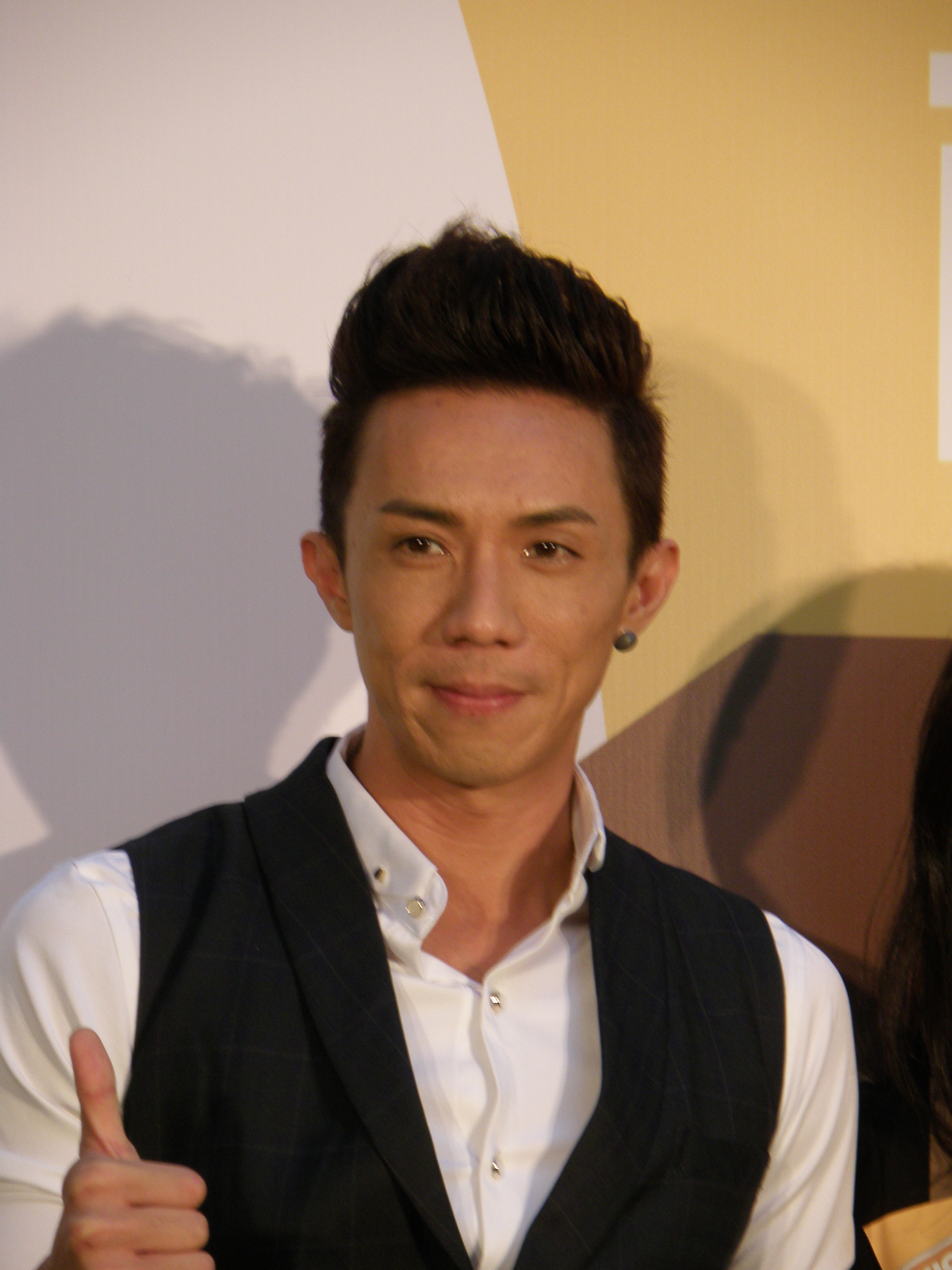
Louis Cheung won in 2014.

=== 1990s ===
Year	Category	Artiste	Work(s)
1998 (2nd)	Drama	Nick Cheung †	Secret of the Heart
1998 (2nd)	Non-drama	Chin Ka-lok †	The Super Trio Show

=== 2000s ===
Year	Artiste	Work(s)
2002 (6th)	Moses Chan †	Where the Legend Begins
2003 (7th)	Raymond Lam †	Survivor's Law
2004 (8th)	Ron Ng †	Twin of Brothers
2005 (9th)	Bosco Wong †	Wars of In-Laws
2005 (9th)	Alex Fong	My Family
2005 (9th)	Kenneth Ma	Scavengers' Paradise
2005 (9th)	Sammul Chan	The Academy
2005 (9th)	Raymond Cho	Healing Hands III
2006 (10th)	Kenneth Ma †	The Herbalist's Manual, La Femme Desperado, Love Guaranteed, and To Grow with Love
2006 (10th)	Kevin Cheng	Under the Canopy of Love and Trimming Success
2006 (10th)	Steven Ma	Safe Guards and Land of Wealth
2006 (10th)	Michael Tse	La Femme Desperado
2006 (10th)	Kenny Wong	The Dance of Passion
2007 (11th)	Amigo Choi †	Scoop, E-Buzz, Jade Solid Gold, and Enjoy Yourself Tonight 2007
2007 (11th)	Wong Cho-lam	Best Selling Secrets
2007 (11th)	Wong Chi-hing	More Than Words, Mystery, and Go! Hong Kong, Go!
2007 (11th)	Stefan Wong	Dicey Business and Steps
2007 (11th)	Lai Lok-yi	Glittering Days, Ten Brothers, Heart of Greed, and The Green Grass of Home
2008 (12th)	Wong Cho-lam †	Best Selling Secrets, D.I.E., Super Trio Supreme, and Miss Hong Kong Pageant 2008
2008 (12th)	Johnson Lee	The Gentle Crackdown II and Catch Me Now
2008 (12th)	Tsui Wing	Best Selling Secrets and D.I.E.
2008 (12th)	Derek Kok	Wars of In-Laws II, The Master of Tai Chi, D.I.E., Your Class or Mine, and Strictly Come Dancing: Cycle 2
2008 (12th)	Oscar Leung	Wars of In-Laws II, The Gentle Crackdown II, Forensic Heroes II, Speech of Silence, and Your Class or Mine
2009 (13th)	Ngo Ka-Nin †	Rosy Business and Sweetness in the Salt
2009 (13th)	Johnson Lee	Just Love II and The Stew of Life
2009 (13th)	Raymond Wong Ho-yin	When Easterly Showers Fall on the Sunny West, Sweetness in the Salt, and ICAC Investigators 2009
2009 (13th)	Raymond Chiu	Off Pedder
2009 (13th)	Jim Tang	Off Pedder

=== 2010s ===
Year	Artiste	Work(s)
2010 (14th)	Raymond Wong Ho-Yin †	A Watchdog's Tale, The Mysteries of Love, When Lanes Merge, Can't Buy Me Love, and No Regrets
2010 (14th)	Alex Lam	Don Juan DeMercado, My Better Half, A Fistful of Stances, The Mysteries of Love, and A Pillow Case of Mystery II
2010 (14th)	King Kong Lee	OL Supreme, No Regrets, and Super Trio Game Master
2010 (14th)	Joel Chan	Don Juan DeMercado, OL Supreme, In the Eye of the Beholder, Sisters of Pearl, and A Pillow Case of Mystery II
2010 (14th)	Him Law	Suspects in Love and Miss Hong Kong in India
2011 (15th)	Jin Au-Yeung †	Big Boys Club, Show Me the Happy, Stairway to Dragon, Yes, Sir. Sorry, Sir!, Lives of Omission, Kung Fu Supernova, and Top Eats 100
2011 (15th)	Lam Tsz-sin	My Sister of Eternal Flower, Ghetto Justice, River of Wine, and Ghetto a la Spice
2011 (15th)	King Kong Lee	Neighbourhood Gourmet and Super Snoops
2011 (15th)	Jason Chan	Only You, Be Home for Dinner, and Dropping by Cloud Nine
2011 (15th)	Mat Yeung	Twilight Investigation, Only You, Be Home for Dinner, My Sister of Eternal Flower, and The Other Truth
2012 (16th)	Oscar Leung †	L'Escargot, Queens of Diamonds and Hearts, House of Harmony and Vengeance, Tiger Cubs, The Confidant, and Big Boys Club
2012 (16th)	Vincent Wong	Wish and Switch, Tiger Cubs, and Silver Spoon, Sterling Shackles
2012 (16th)	King Kong Lee	Let It Be Love, King Maker, Ghetto Justice II, Jade Solid Gold, Battle of the Senses, TV Funny, and Neighborhood Gourmet 2
2012 (16th)	Edwin Siu	Daddy Good Deeds, Gloves Come Off, The Last Steep Ascent, The Confidant, and TV Funny
2012 (16th)	Him Law	L'Escargot, The Hippocratic Crush, Tiger Cubs, and Divas in Distress
2013 (17th)	Vincent Wong †	Friendly Fire, Season of Love, Sergeant Tabloid, A Change of Heart, and Will Power
2013 (17th)	Benjamin Yuen	A Change of Heart, Karma Rider, The Hippocratic Crush II, and Always and Ever
2013 (17th)	Jason Chan Chi-san	Missing You, Will Power, Explore Hotels, and Dolce Vita
2013 (17th)	Edwin Siu	A Great Way to Care II, Bullet Brain, and Brother's Keeper
2013 (17th)	Him Law	A Season of Love, The Hippocratic Crush II, and Triumph in the Skies II
2014 (18th)	Louis Cheung †	Gilded Chopsticks, Black Heart White Soul, Sergeant Tabloid, Come On, Cousin, and The Voice 4
2014 (18th)	Sammy Sum	Line Walker and All That Is Bitter Is Sweet
2014 (18th)	Tony Hung	Outbound Love, Swipe Tap Love, Rear Mirror, and Pilgrimage to Football Meccas
2014 (18th)	Jason Chan Chi-san	ICAC Investigators 2014, Black Heart White Soul, Shades of Life, Overachievers, Dolce Vita, and Quit to Win
2014 (18th)	Mat Yeung	Come Home Love, Outbound Love, Storm in a Cocoon, Black Heart White Soul, and Shades of Life
2015 (19th)	Tony Hung †	Eye In the Sky, Every Step You Take, Captain of Destiny, World's Great Parties, and Not Far But Away
2015 (19th)	William Chak	Officer Geomancer, Raising the Bar, Smooth Talker, Limelight Years, Every Step You Take, and Travel in Shikoku, Japan
2015 (19th)	James Ng	Come Home Love, Jade Solid Gold, Music Power, Organized Dining, and JSG Selections 2015
2015 (19th)	Hugo Wong	Madam Cutie On Duty, Raising the Bar, My "Spiritual" Ex-Lover, Smooth Talker, Limelight Years, and Momentary Lapse of Reason
2015 (19th)	Mat Yeung	Madam Cutie On Duty, Momentary Lapse of Reason, Captain of Destiny, and Lord of Shanghai
2015 (19th)	Benjamin Yuen	Noblesse Oblige and The Fixer
2016 (20th)	Jonathan Cheung †	The Last Healer in Forbidden City, House of Spirits, A Fist Within Four Walls, Spirits on Vacation
2016 (20th)	James Ng	Jade Solid Gold, Organized Dining, Music Power, JSG Selections 2016: Part 1, Big Boys Summer
2016 (20th)	Matthew Ho	Brother's Keeper II, Law dis-Order, No Reserve
2016 (20th)	Hubert Wu	Blue Veins, Summer Holiday, Sermon by Ben Sir
2016 (20th)	Mark Ma	Love as a Predatory Affair, Speed of Life, Short End of the Stick, Come Home Love: Dinner at 8, Presumed Accidents, Between Love & Desire, Inspector Gourmet
2016 (20th)	Bob Cheung	Over Run Over, House of Spirits, Between Love & Desire, Daddy Dearest, Spirits on Vacation
2017 (21st)	Mat Yeung †	My Dearly Sinful Mind, Bet Hur, Love and Construction, All Work No Pay Holidays (Sr. 2)
2017 (21st)	Owen Cheung	The No No Girl, Legal Mavericks, Hong Kong Gag Gag, Amazing Summer Splash
2017 (21st)	Matthew Ho	May Fortune Smile On You, Tiger Mom Blues, A General, a Scholar, and a Eunuch, Tiger Mom Blues Returns
2017 (21st)	Luk Ho-ming	Good Cheap Eats 6, Sir Ben Prop Guide, TVB Anniversary Gala, Young and Restless
2017 (21st)	Hugo Wong	Recipes to Live By, Legal Mavericks, The Exorcist's Meter
2017 (21st)	Hubert Wu	The Exorcist's Meter, My Ages Apart
2018 (22nd)	Matthew Ho †	Watch Out Boss, Apple Colada, The Succession War, Life on the Line, Love Travel With High Speed Rail, Battle For The Exorcist's Meter
2018 (22nd)	Owen Cheung	New Year Is A Game, Cooking Beauties, Story of Yanxi Palace
2018 (22nd)	Luk Ho-ming	Young And Restless, big big channel, Yan Chai Charity Show
2018 (22nd)	Karl Ting	Flying Tiger, Another Era, Wife Interrupted, Yan Chai Charity Show, CNY Eve Special, Big Big Beauty, Sammy On The Go
2018 (22nd)	Hubert Wu	Stealing Seconds, Wife Interrupted, Battle For The Exorcist's Meter
2019 (23rd)	Owen Cheung †	Justice Bao：The First Year, Finding Her Voice, CNY Eve Special, 12 Summers
2019 (23rd)	Kalok Chow	Come Home Love: Lo And Behold, My Life As Loan Shark
2019 (23rd)	Joey Law	ICAC Investigators 2019, Justice Bao：The First Year, Girlie Days, CNY Eve Special, 12 Summers, Fun Abroad
2019 (23rd)	Karl Ting	Come Home Love: Lo And Behold,My Commissioned Lover, The Man Who Kills Troubles
2019 (23rd)	Telford Wong	Dolce Vita, Homegrown Flavours, Sidewalk Scientists ,Liza's Online, The 7th Hong Kong Games, Aged Not Old

==== 2020s ====
Year	Artiste	Work(s)
2020 (24th)	Brian Chu †	Forensic Heroes IV, Airport Strikers, On-Lie Game, Al Cappuccino, Go! Go! Go! Operation C9, Legal Mavericks 2020
2020 (24th)	Joey Law	The Exorcist's 2nd Meter, Hong Kong Love Stories
2020 (24th)	Mark Ma	Airport Strikers, Life After Death
2020 (24th)	Karl Ting	Come Home Love: Lo And Behold, Legal Mavericks 2020
2020 (24th)	Brian Tse	Death By Zero, Line Walker: Bull Fight, Hong Kong Love Stories
2021 (25th)	Joey Law †	The Runner, The Line Watchers, Heart City Hong Kong, Prop Up Youth, A Love of No Words
2021 (25th)	Karl Ting †	Sinister Beings, Battle Of The Seven Sisters, The Line Watchers, A Love of No Words
2021 (25th)	Niklas Lam	Kids' Lives Matter, Heart City Hong Kong, Prop Up Youth
2021 (25th)	Mark Ma	Beauty And The Boss, Sinister Beings, Murder Diary, he Line Watchers
2021 (25th)	Telford Wong	The Line Watchers
2021 (25th)	Hubert Wu	Armed Reaction 2021, A Love of No Words
2022 (26th)	Ricco Ng †	Come Home Love: Lo And Behold, Communion
2022 (26th)	Telford Wong	Stranger Anniversary, I've Got The Power, Mind Games, Miss Hong Kong Pageant - The Comeback
2022 (26th)	Lam King Ching	Touch In The Sky, My Pride, The Beauty of War, Get On A Flat
2022 (26th)	Aska Cheung	Forever Young At Heart, The Beauty of War, Oppa's Cuisine, STARS Academy 2
2022 (26th)	Derek Wong Kin Tung	Barrack O'Karma 1968, Your Highness, Get On A Flat, All-rounded Emcee Contest 2022

== Records ==
Most nominations

Nominations	Actor
3	King Kong Lee
3	Him Law
3	Jason Chan Chi-san

Age superlatives

Record	Actor	Age (in years)
Oldest winner	Mat Yeung	36
Oldest nominee	Derek Kok	44
Youngest winner	Raymond Lam	23
Youngest nominee	Raymond Lam	23
