= Jason Chan Chi-san =

Hong Kong actor (born 1977)

Jason Chan
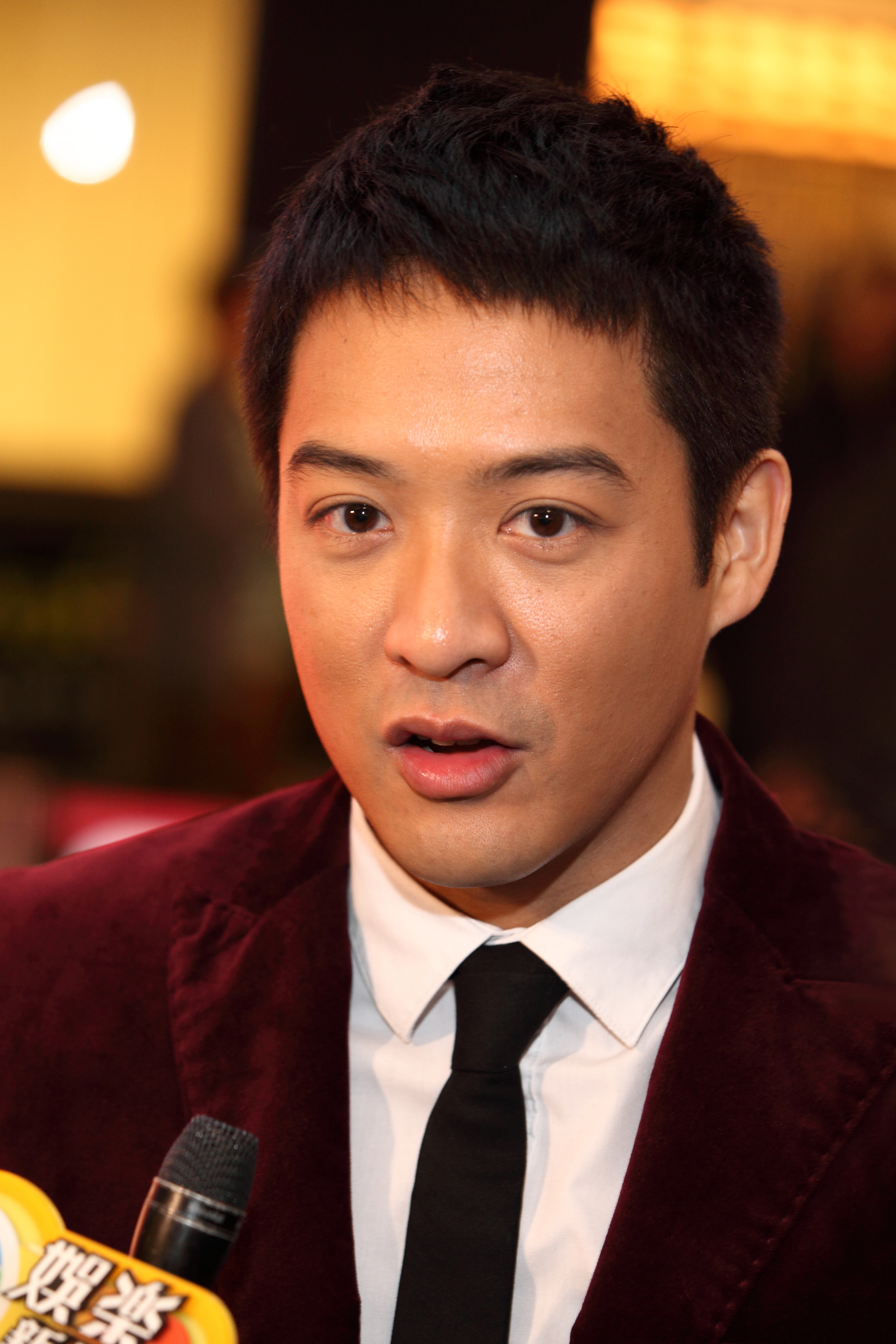
- Chan in 2014
- Born: 12 December 1977 (age 48); London, United Kingdom
- Education: Hong Kong Polytechnic University, University of Hong Kong
- Occupations: Actor; television presenter
- Years active: 2004–present
- Spouse: Sarah Song (m. 2016)
- Children: Jamie Chan, Damon Chan

Chinese name
- Traditional Chinese: 陳智燊
- Simplified Chinese: 陈智燊
Transcriptions
Standard Mandarin
- Hanyu Pinyin: Chén Zhìshēn
Yue: Cantonese
- Jyutping: Can4 Zi3 San1

Jason Chan (born 12 December 1977) is a Hong Kong actor and television presenter. He started off at TVB hosting a variety of English Pearl lifestyle shows, which required the use of his proficiency in various languages: English, Cantonese, Mandarin, French, and Latin.

== Life and career ==
Chan was born to a Hakka distant family in the United Kingdom. He spent 3 years of his childhood in the UK before returning back to Hong Kong when he was 10. He is the second of four children. His eldest brother is a dentist and youngest brother is still in university. In the UK, Chan's family runs a Chinese restaurant. Chan received a bachelor's degree in modern and classical Chinese at the Hong Kong Polytechnic University, and a post-graduate diploma in economics at the University of Hong Kong. During university he had often helped out at his father's restaurant waiting tables, and had taken on various translation jobs. After graduation, Chan worked for two years in hospital management, before finally deciding on a career in TV.

In his first year in Hong Kong, Chan worked as an English tutor at his aunt's education centre. In 2005, Chan joined TVB and graduated from TVB's 20th Artist Training Class in 2006. The following few years, Chan hosted a lifestyle show on Pearl and anchored TVB Entertainment News, whilst at the same time taking on various roles in TV dramas. In 2010, Chan was offered his first major role in the sitcom, Be Home for Dinner (2011). In 2012, he was given his first leading role in the drama Missing You.

Since 2009, he had been rumoured to be dating Miss Chinese International 2007 winner Sarah Song, who lived at different towers within the same residential complex. On 10 August 2014, Sarah posted a photo of herself and Jason Chan. The two were on a dinner together as a celebration of Sarah Song's 29th birthday. In the photo, the sweet couple were smiling happily as the former Miss China International contestant wraps her hand across the Jason's shoulders.

Sarah Song captioned her photo, saying, "Thank you for another birthday. More wonderful birthdays ahead...but hopefully not wrinkles."

This post was then regarded by the public as her confirmation that she is in fact in a relationship with Jason Chan.

In 2018, Jason left TVB. Sarah gave birth to their first baby.

== Presenting works ==
- Dolce Vita
- TVB Entertainment News
- Body Talks
- Play N Chat
- Mix & Match
- Tung Wah Charity Show
- Hong Kong Back Then

== Filmography ==
=== Films ===
Title	Year	Role	Notes
L for Love L for Lies	2008	Alex	
Love is the Only Answer	2011	Jason	
I Love Hong Kong 2013	2013		
Love Is Love: Sunshine - It's Me Again	2015	Evan Toh	MediaCorp Telemovie
Buddy Cops	2016		

=== Television dramas ===
Title	Year	Role	Notes
Bar Bender	2006	Gangster	
At Home With Love	2006	Barrister Lam	
Maidens' Vow	2006	Wang Yuk-lun's friend / Employee	Episode 11
Heavenly In-Laws	2007	Extra	
The Drive of Life	2007	Jorden Keung Hoi	
The Price of Greed	2008	Extra	
Forensic Heroes II	2008	Wong Wing-man (Man)	
Pages of Treasures	2008-09	Patrick Lui Shu-pui	
Burning Flame III	2009	Alan	
You're Hired	2009	Shek	
Beyond the Realm of Conscience	2009	Dorji Pema	
Don Juan DeMercado	2010	Handsome pervert	
OL Supreme	2010	Tony	
Fly with Me	2010	ER doctor	
The Mysteries of Love	2010	Joe Kong Yiu-cho	
Some Day	2010	Lucas Au Chin-cheung	
Every Move You Make	2010	Anthony Ho Wing-kwong	
No Regrets	2010	Henry	
Links to Temptation	2010	Ming	
Dropping By Cloud Nine	2011	Tom	Episode 7: "Love Transfer"; Nominated — TVB Anniversary Award for Most Improved Male Artist (Top 5)
The Rippling Blossom	2011	Tasting staff	
Only You	2011	Nick	Nominated — TVB Anniversary Award for Most Improved Male Artist (Top 5)
Be Home for Dinner	2011	Sam Chung Sze-hon	Nominated — TVB Anniversary Award for Most Improved Male Artist (Top 5); Nominated — TVB Anniversary Award for My Favourite Male Character (Top 15)
My Sister of Eternal Flower	2011	Handsome man	
When Heaven Burns	2011	ER doctor	
No Good Either Way	2012	Aaron Yiu Yee-long	
Missing You	2012–13	Sze Yik-him	
Will Power	2013	Ching Ka-ming	
Black Heart White Soul	2014	Yung Chi-chung	
ICAC Investigators 2014	2014	ICAC Raymond Wong Chi Chung	Episode 3
Shades of Life	2014	Chris	Episode 12
Overachievers	2014	Chiang Tsun	
Romantic Repertoire	2015	Angus Ma	
Wudang Rules	2015	Wah Yi-gai	
Speed of Life	2016	Don Chiu	
Daddy Dearest	2016	Marius Sheung Nim-shu	
Threesome	2018	Theo Kei Hiu-yung	
The Offliners	2020-21	Marcus Hui Ching-wai	
