= Those Famous Women in Chinese History =

- Genre: Historical drama
- Country of origin: Hong Kong
- Original language: Cantonese
- No. of episodes: 20

Production
- Producer: Amy Wong
- Production location: Hong Kong
- Running time: 1 hour

Original release
- Network: ATV

Those Famous Women in Chinese History (歷代奇女子) is a 1988 ATV drama series produced in Hong Kong by Amy Wong.

== Summary ==
The series is based on the life of four ancient historical female figures.

- Empress Lü Zhi (呂后) - first female empress who took over the Han dynasty throne after the death of her husband emperor Gaozu.
- Yu Xuanji (魚玄機) - the bisexual Tang dynasty poet.
- Ti Ying (緹縈) - the girl who went up against Emperor Wen of Han to abolish the Five Punishments.
- (白寡婦)

== Cast ==
Cast	Role
Nora Miao (苗可秀)	Empress Lu Zhi
Bonnie Ngai (魏秋樺)	Yu Xuanji
Kingdom Yuen	Lv Qiao
Tong Ban-cheong (唐品昌)	
Pat Poon (潘志文)	Liu Bang / Li Yi
Lo Chun-shun (魯振順)	Chen Tong
