= Yu Xuanji =

Chinese Tang Dynasty female poet

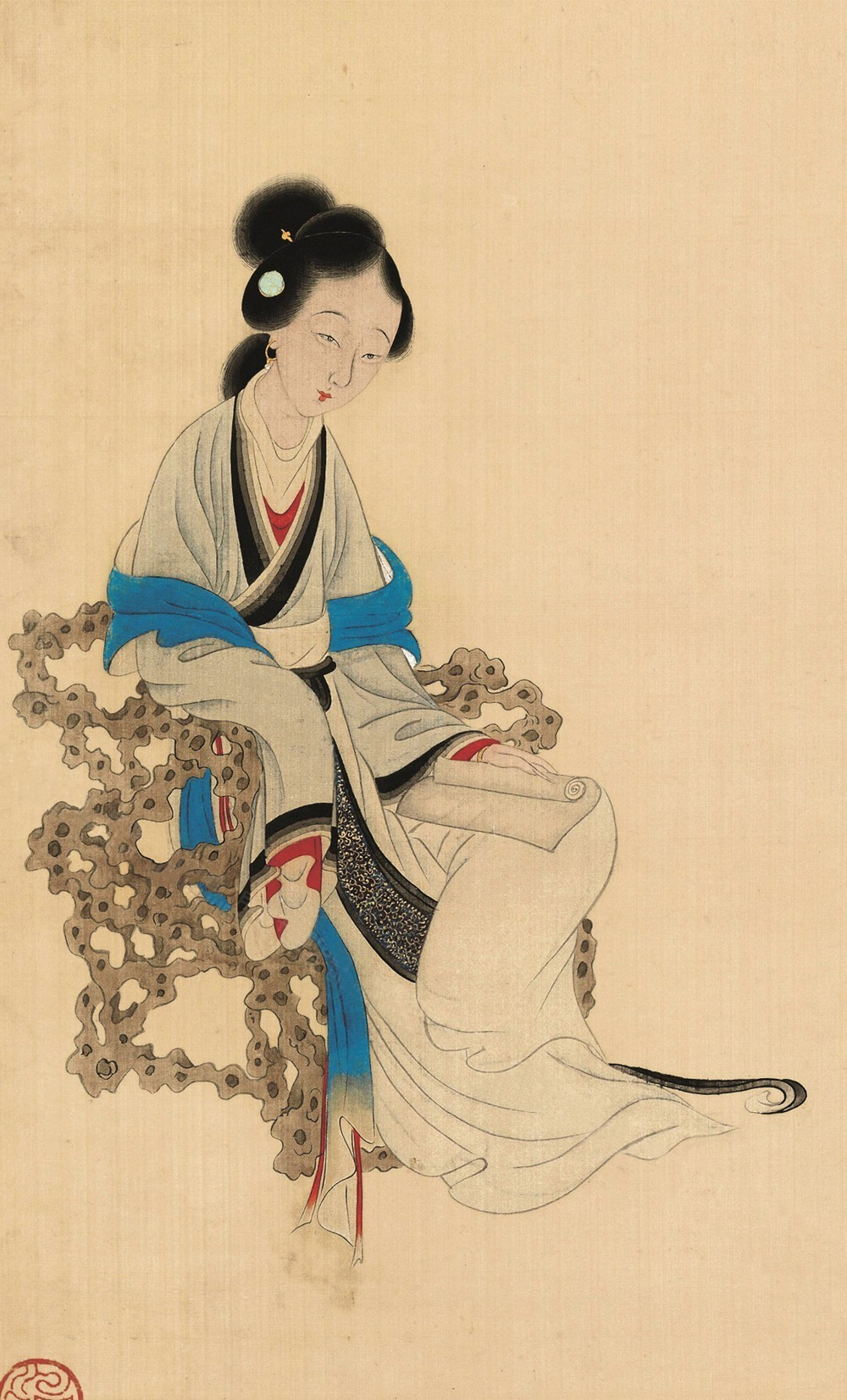
- Yu Xuanji
- Born: c. 840
- Died: c. 868 (aged 28)
- Cause of death: Execution
- Other names: Youwei; Huilan
- Occupations: Poet, Nun, Courtesan
- Known for: Poetry
- Notable work: Fragments of a Northern Dreamland
- Spouse: Li Yi (married c. 856-c. 859)

Yu Xuanji (simplified Chinese: 鱼玄机; traditional Chinese: 魚玄機; pinyin: Yú Xuánjī; Wade–Giles: Yü Hsüan-chi, c. 840 – c. 868), courtesy names Youwei (Chinese: 幼薇; pinyin: Yòuwēi) and Huilan (simplified Chinese: 蕙兰; traditional Chinese: 蕙蘭; pinyin: Huìlán), was a Chinese female poet, courtesan, and Daoist nun during the late Tang dynasty who was born in Chang'an. Along with Xue Tao, she was one of the foremost poets of the Tang dynasty.

== Biography ==
Little information is available about the relatively short life of Yu Xuanji. She was born or grew up in Tang capital Chang'an. She was a concubine or a lesser wife to an official named Li Yi (simplified Chinese: 李亿; traditional Chinese: 李億; pinyin: Lǐ Yì) at 16, separating three years later because of Li's primary wife's dislike of Yu. Likewise, she was also a courtesan. Scholar Jinhua Jia, however, contends that the label of courtesan is a misunderstanding derived from information added in later editions to slander her.

She had a "painted boat" on the Wei River. Yu later took her vows and became a Daoist nun at the Xianyi guan (咸宜觀, Abbey of Universal Benefit). Daoist nuns were at the time known for their sexual freedom During her time as a nun she travelled frequently and her travels influenced her writing. Yu had a reputation for being sexually adventurous and is recognised by some as China's first openly bisexual female.

She was a fellow of Wen Tingyun, to whom she addressed a number of poems. Apart from names and dates in her poems, the tabloid-style Little Tablet from the Three Rivers, (三水小牘), gives the only purported facts about her life. These are however salacious in detail: it reports she had an affair with Wen Tingyun, lived a scandalously promiscuous life, and was executed by decapitation at the age of 28 for allegedly strangling her maid, Luqiao, to death. This account is considered semi-legendary, and may be a reflection of the traditional distrust of women who were strong-willed and sexually independent.

== Poetry ==
Yu Xuanji is distinctive for the quality of her poems, including many written in what seems to be a remarkably frank and direct autobiographical style; that is, using her own voice rather than speaking through a persona. In her lifetime, her poems were published as a collection called Fragments of a Northern Dreamland, which has been lost. The forty-nine surviving poems were collected in the Quan Tangshi, mainly for their freak value in an anthology that also included poems from ghosts and foreigners.

== English translations ==
Published in 1998, her work was translated by the team of David Young and Jiann I. Lin. In the 2000s, her work was translated by Stephen Owen and Justin Hill.

== Name ==
Her family name, Yu, is relatively rare. Her given name, Xuanji, means something like "Profound Theory" or "Mysterious Principle," and is a technical term in Daoism and Buddhism. "Yòuwēi" means something like "Young and Tiny;" and, Huìlán refers to a species of fragrant orchid.

== Media ==
In 1984 the Shaw Brothers Studio in Hong Kong made a film about her life entitled 唐朝豪放女 (An Amorous Woman of Tang Dynasty), starred Pat Ha and Alex Man.

In 1988, the Asia Television Limited in Hong Kong filmed an anthology drama series about her life, titled 歷代奇女子 (Those Famous Women in Chinese History), starred Bonnie Ngai, Pat Poon and Kingdom Yuen

Yu Xuanji is the subject of the 1915 short story Gyogenki by Japanese author Mori Ōgai. She was the nun in Robert van Gulik's 1968 "Judge Dee" novel Poets and Murder and the subject of Qiu Xiaolong's 2021 The Shadow of the Empire.

Justin Hill's Somerset Maugham Award award-winning novel Passing Under Heaven reimagines Yu Xuanji's life.

== Sources ==
- Chang, Kang-i Sun; Saussy, Haun; Kwong, Charles Yim-tze (1999). Women Writers of Traditional China: An Anthology of Poetry and Criticism. Stanford University Press. ISBN 9780804732314.
- Fu, Shousun, "Yu Xuanji". Encyclopedia of China (Chinese Literature Edition), 1st ed. Archived from the original on 29 September 2007. (in Chinese)
- Kohn, Livia; Roth, Harold David (2002). Daoist Identity: Cosmology, Lineage, and Ritual. University of Hawaii Press. ISBN 978-0-8248-2504-1.
- Lee, Lily Xiao Hong; Wiles, Sue (2014). Biographical Dictionary of Chinese Women: Tang Through Ming, 618-1644. M.E. Sharpe. ISBN 9780765643162.
- Minford, John, ed. (2000). Classical Chinese literature: an anthology of translations. Vol. 1: From antiquity to the Tang Dynasty. Vol. 1 (1 ed.). New York: Columbia Univ. Press. p. 972. ISBN 978-962-996-048-3.
- Mori, Ogai (1991). Dilworth, David; Rimer, J. Thomas (eds.). The Historical Fiction of Mori ÅOgai. University of Hawaii Press. ISBN 9780824813666.
- Xuanji, Yu; Yü, Hsüan-chi (1998). The Clouds Float North: The Complete Poems of Yu Xuanji. Translated by Young, David; Lin, Jiann I. Wesleyan University Press. ISBN 9780819563446.
