= The Ultimate Crime Fighter =

Television drama

- Poster
- 通天幹探
- Genre: Action
- Screenplay by: Ng Siu-tong; Wong Yuk-tak; Cheng Sing-mo; Lai Ka-ming; Tam Chui-san; Ma Ka-wai; Sin Siu-ling
- Directed by: Kwan Shu-ming; Liu Chun-ngan; Kwan Man-sam; Wong Sze-yuen; Au Yiu-hing
- Starring: Yuen Biao; Moses Chan; Kevin Cheng; Gigi Lai; Yoyo Mung; Maggie Shiu; Bryan Leung
- Theme music composer: Tang Chi-wai; Yip Siu-chung
- Opening theme: The Ultimate Crime Fighter instrumental theme (通天幹探)
- Ending theme: Grant Me Death (賜我一死) by Moses Chan
- Country of origin: Hong Kong
- Original language: Cantonese
- No. of episodes: 34 (Hong Kong); 37 (Overseas)

Production
- Producer: Amy Wong
- Running time: 45 minutes (approx.)
- Production company: TVB

Original release
- Network: TVB Jade
- Release: 8 October – 24 November 2007

The Ultimate Crime Fighter (Chinese: 通天幹探) is a 2007 Hong Kong action television series produced by TVB and starring international action film star Yuen Biao and TVB Anniversary Award for Best Actor winner Moses Chan. Premiering on 8 October 2007, the series was shown to celebrate TVB's 40th Anniversary.

== Plot ==
Yuen Fo-sang (Yuen Biao), a police officer, was once a prominent policeman that left the Hong Kong Police force after an accidental shooting of a youth. Filled with guilt as well as his wife leaving him (taking their daughter away as well) he decided to train with the Shaolin monks to help put his mind at peace. After nearly 5 years of training, he is still haunted by his past actions and returned to HK only because his master and his Shaolin group decided to do a live TV performance. After an encounter with a mentally disturbed man in the show and his own internal conflicts, his master suggested he face what haunts him and live life. With the interference of Fo, Ginger Keung (Yoyo Mung) and Johnlung Wai (Moses Chan), an undercover police officer, manages to solve a drug/cult/gang operation. After his aid in the case, he returned to the force as a cop. As the story progresses he would develop precognitive capabilities to allow him to see the future. He also realizes that his visions have trouble being fixed. He eventually realized that even though he can see the future, he can't prevent it from happening. He realized that Johnlung would kill him and accepted his fate. While confronting Johnlung to that exact moment in time where he saw his own death, he actually didn't shoot Johnlung, but Tim Chong (Ben Wong) who was about to attack him. The wound was mortal and he died for several minutes, but after a vision with Buddha he returned to the living and was happy to know Lung repented his dark path.

Johnlung spent several years undercover as a Thai HK immigrant trying to make ends meet through servitude for the triads. Throughout his time there he had frequent contacts and information that helped provide evidence to arrest the triads. As the first story arc investigates a cult and triads, he found out that both are related and with the interference of Yuen Fo-sang and backup from Ginger, he helps arrest the triad gang leader and return to civilian and cop life. As the story progresses, he would develop a relationship with Wong Chi-ying (Gigi Lai) however due to misunderstandings they would have an on/off relationship. Ultimately Ying would die at the hands of Aaren Chong (Kevin Cheng) and Johnlung would go on a vengeance quest to kill him. In between his despair, he got drunk and had a one-night stand with Ginger, leading to her pregnancy. Eventually he would kill Aaren, but he said it was Aaren's greedy brother, Tim, that ended his life. Tim knew it was really Johnlung that killed his brother and Johnlung tried to kill him to eliminate evidence. Tim was caught by Johnlung and was about to kill him when Sang found him and tried to convince him to repent. Tim got up and tried to kill Johnlung in the back, Johnlung thought Sang was going to shoot him and so they exchanged fire. When he realized Sang shot Tim and not him, he realized he made a severe error. He had Sang taken to a hospital and himself arrested. He would end up jailed, but used that time to reflect on his errors through Buddhist texts. When he finally was released, he's a changed man and he only desired to be a good father to his baby son.

Ginger Keung (Yoyo Mung) started out as a lead investigator and officer, but due to her job her family felt she wouldn't find any male suitors. She eventually left the force and decided to become a specialized lawyer. Although she was involved with a fellow lawyer, she developed feelings for Johnlung. Eventually when she couldn't stand her boyfriend's devious ways, she broke it off and started spending more time with Johnlung. After Johnlung lost Ying, she tried to be a supportive friend, but she wanted more from him. This led to her pregnancy and her quest to try to convince Lung to change his ways as she's well aware that Lung's quest on vengeance has led him to manipulate evidence and attempt to eliminate Tim. After Johnlung was jailed, she waited for his return and after he was released they were one happy family.

Aaren is a bisexual tycoon. His father is part of a famous toy production company and cared a great deal about family image. When Aaren developed a homosexual relationship with a male friend, he kept it secret until he wanted to force his hand to come out. He killed his boyfriend and buried him over a secluded area in the hills. Only he knew about the secret and for several years he lived life quietly and started a relationship with Ying after she broke up with Johnlung. Ying became Aaren's confidant, but eventually his mix of lies and truths became apparent and Ying warned Johnlung about Aaren's suspicious past (without knowing he killed his boyfriend). Aaren was angry that she suspected him and would tell off someone about their secrets and so Aaren tried to kill Ying. They would put up a struggle until they both fell into the ocean and Aaren tried to drown Ying. Because witnesses came, Aaren used this excuse that he tried to commit suicide and that Ying tried to save him, but ended up injuring herself. Johnlung didn't accept that as the truth, but because Ying is in a coma the truth would never come. Aaren planned to kill her by transferring her to a private hospital where he's able to act without too many witnesses, but she died. It wasn't long that Johnlung discovered that a Thai man was taping the local area and had the very tape that clearly displayed Aaren's murderous intent. Johnlung and Aaren would eventually play a game of how much they can hurt each other by making personal attacks on each other's families. Johnlung would deliver a disk of the actual murder to Aaren's father, leading to a heart attack. Aaren would distract Johnlung's nephew to look like he was kidnapped. Eventually Aaren was kidnapped by his own brother, Tim, who desperately needed money. After the drop was made though, Tim's friends wanted to kill Aaren. Johnlung was part of the investigating group over Aaren's apparent kidnap and Johnlung took the opportunity to kill Aaren after he mocked him for being unable the finish the job and that the heavens was so good to him. Aaren's true death would eventually come into light after Johnlung turned his ways and confessed his crimes. Although Aaren's true death was revealed, only his family missed him as everyone knows him as the disturbed killer that he is.

== Characters ==
- Yuen Fo-sang (Yuen Biao), a police officer, was once a prominent policeman that left the Hong Kong Police force after an accidental shooting of a youth. Filled with guilt as well as his wife leaving him (taking their daughter away as well) he decided to train with the Shaolin monks to help put his mind at peace. After nearly five years of training, he is still haunted by his past actions and returned to HK only because his master and his Shaolin group decided to do a live TV performance. After an encounter with a mentally disturbed man in the show and his own internal conflicts, his master suggested he face what haunts him and live life. With the interference of Fo, Ginger Keung and Johnlung Wai, an undercover police officer, manages to solve a drug/cult/gang operation. After his aid in the case, he returned to the force as a cop. As the story progresses he would develop precognitive capabilities to allow him to see the future. He also realize that his visions have trouble being fixed. He eventually realized that even though he can see the future, he can't prevent it from ending as well. He realized that Johnlung would kill him and accepted his fate. While confronting Johnlung to that exact moment in time where he saw his own death, he actually didn't shoot Johnlung, but Tim Chong (Ben Wong) who was about to attack him. The wound was mortal and he died for several minutes, but after a vision with Buddha he returned to the living and was happy to know Lung repented his dark path.
- Johnlung Wai Chun-Lung (Moses Chan) spent several years undercover as a Thai HK immigrant trying to make ends meet through servitude for the triads. Throughout his time there he had a frequent contacts and information that helped provide evidence to arrest the triads. As the first story arc investigates a cult and triads, he found out that both are related and with the interference of Yuen Fo-sang and backup from Ginger, he helps arrest the triad gang leader and return to civilian and cop life. As the story progresses, he would develop a relationship with Wong Chi-ying (Gigi Lai) however due to misunderstandings they would have an on/off relationship. Ultimately Ying would die at the hands of Aaren Chong and Johnlung would go on a vengeance quest to kill him. In between his despair, he got drunk and had a one-night stand with Ginger, leading to her pregnancy. Eventually he would kill Aaren, but he said it was Aaren's greedy brother, Tim, that ended his life. Tim knew it was really Johnlung that killed his brother and Johnlung tried to kill him to eliminate evidence. Tim was caught by Johnlung and was about to kill him when Sang found him and try to convince him to repent. Tim got up and tried to kill Johnlung in the back, Johnlung thought Sang was going to shoot him and so they exchanged fire. When he realized Sang shot Tim and not him, he realized he made a severe error. He had Sang taken to a hospital and himself arrested. He would end up jailed, but used that time to reflect on his errors through Buddhist texts. When he finally was released, he's a changed man and he only desire to be a good father to his baby son.
- Ginger Keung Nga-Yue (Yoyo Mung) started out as a lead investigator and officer, but due to her job her family felt she wouldn't find any male suitors. She eventually left the force and decided to become a specialized lawyer. Although she was involved with a fellow lawyer, she developed feelings for Johnlung. Eventually, when she couldn't stand her boyfriend's devious ways, she broke it off and started spending more time with Johnlung. After Johnlung lost Ying, she tried to be a supportive friend, but she wanted more from him. This led to her pregnancy and her quest to try to convince Lung to change his ways as she's well aware that Lung's quest on vengeance has led him to manipulate evidence and attempt to eliminate Tim. After Johnlung was jailed, she waited for his return and after he was released they were one happy family.
- Aaren Chong Man-Hei (Kevin Cheng) is a bisexual tycoon. His father is part of a famous toy production company and cared a great deal about family image. When Aaren developed a homosexual relationship with a male friend, he kept it secret until he wanted to force his hand to come out. He killed his boyfriend and buried him over a secluded area in the hills. Only he knew about the secret and for several years he lived life quietly and started a relationship with Ying after she broke up with Johnlung. Ying became Aaren's confidant, but eventually his mix of lies and truths became apparent and Ying warned Johnlung about Aaren's suspicious past (without knowing he killed his boyfriend). Aaren was angry that she suspected him and would tell off someone about their secrets and so Aaren tried to kill Ying. They would put up a struggle until they both fell into the ocean and Aaren tried to drown Ying. Because witnesses came, Aaren used this excuse that he tried to commit suicide and that Ying tried to save him, but ended up injuring herself. Johnlung didn't accept that as the truth, but because Ying is in a coma the truth would never come. Aaren planned to kill her by transferring her to a private hospital where he's able to act without too many witnesses, but she died. It wasn't long that Johnlung discovered that a Thai man was taping the local area and had the very tape the clearly displayed Aaren's murderous intent. Johnlung and Aaren would eventually play a game of how much they can't hurt each other by making personal attacks on each other's families. Johnlung would deliver a disk of the actual murder to Aaren's father, leading to a heart attack. Aaren would distract Johnlung's nephew to look like he was kidnapped. Eventually Aaren was kidnapped by his own brother, Tim, who desperately needed money. After the drop was made though, Tim friends wanted to kill Aaren. Johnlung was part of the investigating group over Aaren's apparent kidnap and Johnlung took the opportunity to kill Aaren after he mocked him for being unable the finish the job and that the heavens was so good to him. Aaren's true death would eventually come into light after Johnlung turned his ways and confessed his crimes. Although Aaren's true death was revealed, only his family missed him as everyone knows him as the disturbed killer that he is.(Main Antagonist)

== Viewership ratings ==
| | Week | Episode | Average Points | Peaking Points | References |
|---|---|---|---|---|---|
| 1 | October 8–12, 2007 | 1 — 5 | 28 | 30 | |
| 2 | October 15–19, 2007 | 6 — 10 | 27 | 29 | |
| 3 | October 22–26, 2007 | 11 — 15 | 28 | — | |
| 4 | October 29 - November 1, 2007 | 16 — 19 | 29 | 31 | |
| 5 | November 5–9, 2007 | 20 — 24 | 27 | 29 | |
| 6 | November 12–16, 2007 | 25 — 29 | 29 | 31 | |
| 7 | November 20–23, 2007 | 30 — 33 | 31 | 33 | |
| 7 | November 24, 2007 | 34 | 30 | 33 | |

== Awards and nominations ==
| Award | Category | Recipient | Result | Top 5 |
|---|---|---|---|---|
| TVB Anniversary Awards (2007) | Best Drama | The Ultimate Crime Fighter | Nominated | — |
| TVB Anniversary Awards (2007) | Best Actor | Yuen Biao | Nominated | — |
| TVB Anniversary Awards (2007) | Best Actress | Yoyo Mung | Nominated | — |
| TVB Anniversary Awards (2007) | Best Actress | Gigi Lai | Nominated | — |
| TVB Anniversary Awards (2007) | Best Supporting Actor | Bryan Leung | Nominated | — |
| TVB Anniversary Awards (2007) | Best Supporting Actress | Natalie Tong | Nominated | — |
| TVB Anniversary Awards (2007) | My Favourite Male Character | Yuen Biao | Nominated | — |
| TVB Anniversary Awards (2007) | My Favourite Male Character | Kevin Cheng | Nominated | — |
| TVB Anniversary Awards (2007) | My Favourite Female Character | Yoyo Mung | Nominated | — |
| TVB Anniversary Awards (2007) | My Favourite Female Character | Gigi Lai | Nominated | Entered |
| TVB Anniversary Awards (2007) | Most Improved Male Artist | Matthew Ko | Nominated | — |
| TVB Anniversary Awards (2007) | Most Improved Female Artist | Natalie Tong | Won | Entered |
| TVB Anniversary Awards (2007) | Most Improved Female Artist | Fala Chen | Nominated | Entered |
| Next TV Awards 2008 | Top Ten Television Programme | The Ultimate Crime Fighter (#9) | Won | |
| Next TV Awards 2008 | Top Ten Television Artiste | Moses Chan (#3) | Won | |
