= No Good Either Way =

Hong Kong television series

- Promo poster
- 衝呀！瘦薪兵團
- Genre: Comedy drama
- Written by: Lau Chi-wah
- Starring: Ruco Chan; Kristal Tin; Louis Yuen; Natalie Tong; Jason Chan Chi-san; Stephen Au; Florence Kwok; Leanne Li; Matt Yeung
- Opening theme: "Sau San Juk" [瘦薪族 (Lean Businessman)] by Ruco Chan, Louis Yuen, Gill Mohindepaul Singh
- Country of origin: Hong Kong
- Original language: Cantonese
- No. of episodes: 21

Production
- Executive producer: Amy Wong
- Production location: Hong Kong
- Camera setup: Multi camera
- Running time: 45 mins.
- Production company: TVB

Original release
- Network: Jade; HD Jade
- Release: 11 June – 6 July 2012

Related
- House of Harmony and Vengeance; Three Kingdoms RPG

No Good Either Way
- intertitle
- Traditional Chinese: 衝呀！瘦薪兵團
- Simplified Chinese: 冲呀！瘦薪兵团
- Literal meaning: "Charge! Thin Salary Army"
Transcriptions
Standard Mandarin
- Hanyu Pinyin: Chōngya! Shòu Xīn Bīngtuán
Yue: Cantonese
- Jyutping: Cung1 Aa3! Sau3 San1 Bing1 Tyun5

No Good Either Way is a Hong Kong television comedy-drama serial produced by TVB under executive producer Amy Wong. It stars Ruco Chan, Kristal Tin and Louis Yuen, with Natalie Tong, Jason Chan Chi-san, Stephen Au and Florence Kwok as the major supporting cast. The first episode premiered on 11 June 2012.

The drama depicts the lives of office employees in Hong Kong working for their overbearing and abusive bosses.

== Synopsis ==
Although valued by their boss Ko Wai-ting (Stephen Au), product designer Alex Mo (Ruco Chan) and marketing officer Steve Man (Louis Yuen) of GOALTECH Scientific, Ltd. despise their department's general manager Violet Che (Florence Kwok), who is preventing them from getting a promotion. Enumerating the "ten sins" of Violet, Alex and Steve secretly start a business with their Indian friend Interpal (Gill Mohindepaul Singh). Alex's girlfriend, Ling (Kristal Tin) joins GOALTECH, and pressures Violet to step down. Alex is later promoted to manager, and Steve eventually becomes the new boss of the company. As Alex and Steve's positions climb higher, they begin to exert similar pressure on their subordinates, also committing the "ten sins."

== Production ==
TVB released news to the media of the drama's development after announcing the signing of Ruco Chan in January 2012, who subsequently had to turn down a role in The Confidant. At the time, No Good Either Way was known in Chinese as The Chok Family or The Chok Clan (Chok氣一族), but the working title was later referred to as Amy Wong's New Drama for a majority of the drama's filming duration due to the ambiguous meaning behind the Cantonese vernacular "chok." On 19 January, a press conference and costume fitting for the drama was held at TVB Studio 1. Filming officially began on 6 February and ended on 13 April. A blessing ceremony was held on 15 February

== Cast ==
=== Main characters ===
- Ruco Chan as Alex Mo (巫雅歷; jyutping: Mou Ngaalik):

A witty chief product designer for GOALTECH who is manipulated into losing his promotion.

- Natalie Tong as Kin (巫健兒; Mou Ginji):

Alex's aggressive younger sister who works as a property agent.

- Louis Yuen as Steve Man (閔家華; Man Gaawaa):

A marketing officer at GOALTECH who never got a chance for promotion despite his many years of experience.

- Jason Chan Chi-san as Aaron Yiu (姚以朗; Jiu Jilong):

Kin's boyfriend and product designer at GOALTECH. Although charismatic, Aaron is resentful and afraid of failure.

- Kristal Tin as Ling (甯寧靜; Ning Ningzing):

Alex's girlfriend then wife who eventually becomes his direct supervisor at GOALTECH.

- Leanne Li as Dr. Flora Shum (沈曦雯; Sam Heiman):

A selfless trainee doctor and Steve's love interest.

- Florence Kwok as Violet Che (車詠嫻; Ce Winghaan):

The selfish and unscrupulous general manager of GOALTECH's Creative and Marketing department who is the root of Alex and Steve's problems.

=== Supporting characters ===
- Stephen Au as Sam Ko (高偉霆; Gou Waiting), The sincere C.E.O. of GOALTECH who gets bullied around by his wife's family.
- Katy Kung as Lily, Kin's best friend.
- Mat Yeung as Jacky Ho (何正直; Ho Zingzik), Kin's upright and prudent supervisor who has a crush on her.
- William Chak as a trainee doctor and Flora's boyfriend
- Chun Wong as Lam Kau-wing (林球榮), Alex's supervisor of COALTECH.
- Gill Mohindepaul Singh as Interpal Singh (盛小龍; Sing Siulung), Alex and Steve's self-employed Indian-Chinese friend.
- Suet Nei
- Casper Chan
- Yeung Chiu-hoi
- Celine Ma
- Raymond Chiu
- Mandy Lam as Chan Oi-lin (陳愛蓮; Can Oilin), Ting's wife.
- Glen Lee
- Meini Cheung
- Yvonne Ho
- Candice Chiu
- Candy Chu
- Daniel Chau
- Brian Chu
- Leung Ka-ki
- Max Cheung
- Jason Lam
- Fanny Ip
- Bryant Mak
- Coffee Lam

== Viewership ratings ==
The following is a table that includes a list of the total ratings points based on television viewership.

Week	Originally Aired	Episodes	Average Points	Peaking Points	References
1	11 June 2012	1	30	32	
1	June 12–15, 2012	2 — 5	28	31	
2	June 18–22, 2012	6 — 10	28	—	
3	June 25–29, 2012	11 — 15	28	—	
4	July 2–5, 2012	16 — 19	30	—	
4	July 6, 2012	20 — 21	33	37	
