= Justin Hill (writer) =

English novelist

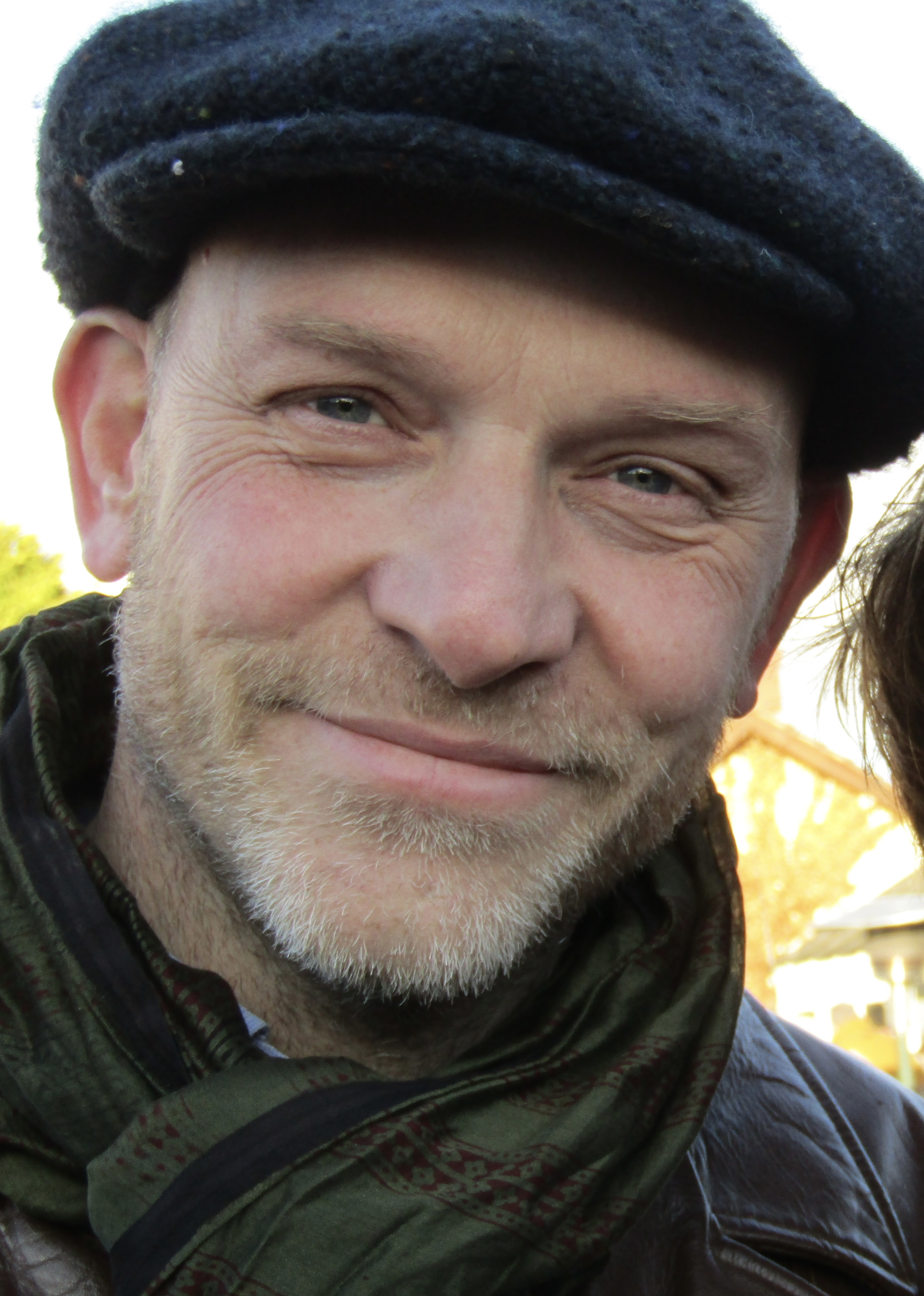
- Born: 1971 (age 54–55); Freeport, Grand Bahama Island
- Occupation: Writer
- Spouse: Elle Hill
- Writing career
- Genres: Historical fiction, literary fiction, travelogue
- Notable works: Shieldwall; The Drink and Dream Teahouse; Passing Under Heaven; Crouching Tiger, Hidden Dragon: Sword of Destiny; Viking Fire
- Notable awards: Somerset Maugham Award; Geoffrey Faber Memorial Prize; Betty Trask Award; Xiaoxiang Friendship Award
- Website: www.justinhillauthor.com

Justin Hill (born 31 May 1971) is an English novelist.

== Biography ==
Justin Hill was born in Freeport, Grand Bahama Island in 1971, and he grew up in Yorkshire, England. He was educated at St Peter's School, an independent school in York.

As a member of St Cuthbert's Society, Durham University, he studied English Language and Medieval Literature. After leaving university in 1992, he worked with the VSO (Voluntary Service Overseas) for seven years in rural China and Eritrea. He has a MA from Lancaster University, and was awarded a PhD by Goldsmiths College, University of London in 2019. His doctoral thesis was titled "Viking Fire: a practical and theoretical exploration of the historical novel".

He reviews regularly for The Times Literary Supplement and the South China Morning Post. Between 2009 and 2015 he ran the undergraduate Creative Writing course at the City University of Hong Kong. His work has been translated into seventeen languages and banned in China.

== Career ==
Hill's debut novel, The Drink and Dream Teahouse, written when he was a student, received a record breaking advance for an unfinished novel. It won several major awards, including the Geoffrey Faber Memorial Prize and the Betty Trask Prize, as well as being a 2001 Washington Post Book of the Year. He has since won the Somerset Maugham Award and been shortlisted for the Encore Award. Shieldwall, the first of his Conquest Series was a Sunday Times Book of the Year. Viking Fire, was a Times Book of the Year.

The British Council describes Hill as 'a novelist and travel writer with a growing international reputation, whose writing has been mostly associated with the people, culture and history of China.' It also said that Hill 'has already shown his mastery of the historical novel. He is able to re-create ancient eras beautifully, and fully engage our sympathies for the lives and loves of his characters.'

His first novel, The Drink and Dream Teahouse, is a commentary on contemporary China.

Passing Under Heaven, reimagines the life of female poet Yu Xuanji.

Ciao Asmara recounts the history and present of Eritrea.

Shieldwall is the first in the Conquest Trilogy, which chronicles the events surrounding the Battle of Hastings, in 1066.

Viking Fire is the second of the Conquest Trilogy which tells the life of Harald Hardrada.

In summer 2014 Hill was commissioned to write the novelisation of the movie Crouching Tiger, Hidden Dragon II: The Green Legend. It was published in February 2016 by Weinstein Books.

== Awards and honours ==
- 2001 Washington Post Notable Book, The Drink and Dream Teahouse
- 2002 Betty Trask Award, winner, The Drink and Dream Teahouse
- 2003 Geoffrey Faber Memorial Prize, winner, The Drink and Dream Teahouse
- 2003 Thomas Cook Travel Book Award shortlist, Ciao Asmara
- 2005 Somerset Maugham Award, winner, Passing Under Heaven
- 2005 A Sunday Telegraph Book of the Year, Passing Under Heaven
- 2005 An Independent on Sunday Book of the Year, Passing Under Heaven
- 2005 Encore Award shortlist, Passing Under Heaven
- 2005 Xiaoxiang Friendship Award from the Governor of Hunan
- 2012 A Sunday Times Book of the Year, Shieldwall
- 2016 A Times Book of the Year, Viking Fire
- 2021 Shortlisted, Hislibris Historical Literature Awards, Best Historical Novel translated into Spanish, Shieldwall (Muro de escudos, translated by Pedro Santamaría Ediciones Pàmies

== Bibliography ==
- A Bend in the Yellow River (1997, ISBN 978-0-7538-0114-7)
- The Drink and Dream Teahouse (2001, ISBN 978-0-7538-1320-1)
- Ciao Asmara (2002, ISBN 978-0-349-11526-9)
- Passing Under Heaven (2004, ISBN 978-0-349-11739-3)
- Shieldwall (2011, ISBN 978-1-4087-0278-9)
- Crouching Tiger, Hidden Dragon: Sword of Destiny (2016, ISBN 978-1602862876)
- Viking Fire (2016, ISBN 978-1408702796)
