= Links to Temptation =

- Official poster
- 誘情轉駁
- Genre: Modern thriller
- Starring: Steven Ma; Yoyo Mung; Fala Chen; Johnson Lee; Timmy Hung; Kenny Wong
- Opening theme: Oi Ching Juen Bok (愛情轉駁 Love Transfer) performed by Fala Chen
- Country of origin: Hong Kong
- Original language: Cantonese
- No. of episodes: 20

Production
- Producer: Tsui Yu-on
- Production location: Hong Kong
- Editor: Lau Chi-wah
- Camera setup: Multi camera
- Running time: 45 minutes (each)
- Production company: TVB

Original release
- Network: TVB Jade
- Release: 13 December 2010 – 7 January 2011

Links to Temptation (Traditional Chinese: 誘情轉駁) is a 2010 Hong Kong modern suspense drama starring Steven Ma, Yoyo Mung, Fala Chen and Kenny Wong.

== Synopsis ==
Kwan Ho-Chin (Yoyo Mung) is the daughter of rich businessman Ko Wing-Tai (Lau Tan), Ko not only abandoned the unborn Kwan and her mother in Macao but stole her mother's life savings to begin his business empire. Years later in Hong Kong Kwan plots revenge, and hires Macao pole dancer Hung Long-Kiu (Fala Chen) to seduce Ko with the aim of pretending that Hung is Ko's daughter once they have become lovers.

Ko is prevented from consummating his relationship with Hung, but is fooled into thinking that Hung is indeed his long lost daughter. With her plan to convince Ko that he has committed incest foiled, Kwan instead sets her sights on Ko's fortune, and asks Hung to play along with Ko's misconception. Ko treats Hung as his own flesh and blood and tries to make amends for being an absent father, rewriting his will to favour Hung over his own son.

Shing Wai-shun (Steven Ma) is a barrister in love with Hung since a chance encounter in Macao. At times thinking that she is an innocent victim and at times a mercenary opportunist. They become a couple but when Ko and Kwan die in quick succession the finger of suspicion points to Hung, Shing must defend his loved one in court, but even he must ask himself did Hung kill Ko and then Kwan for her inheritance.

== Cast and characters ==
=== Kwan Family ===
Cast	Role	Description
Manna Chan	Kwan Yuk-sheung 關玉嫦	Ko Wing-tai's ex-wife Kwan Ho-ching's mother Ko Chung-wing's stepmother Suffered from mental disorder Died of a heart attack in Episode 16
Yoyo Mung	Kwan Ho-ching 關可晴	Jessie; A mobile phone shop owner Ko Wing-tai and Kwan Yuk-sheung's daughter Ko Chung-wings half-younger sister Lau Hau-fai's girlfriend, but later broke up Shing Wai-yip's girlfriend, but later broke up Hung Long-kiu's friend, but later broke up Made use of Hung Long-kiu and Lau Hau-fai; Framed Ko Wing-tai and Ko Chung-wing; Killed by Lau Hau-fai in Episode 18 (Main villain)

=== Shing Family ===
Cast	Role	Description
Yu Yang	Shing Lap-yan 成立仁	David; A lawyer Leung Kwai-fan's husband Shing Wai-shun and Shing Wai-yip's father
Helen Ma	Leung Kwai-fan 梁桂芬	Shing Lap-yan's wife Shing Wai-shun and Shing Wai-yip's mother
Steven Ma	Shing Wai-shun 成偉信	Wilson; A barrister Shing Lap-yan and Leung Kwai-fan's elder son Shing Wai-yip's elder brother Hung Long-kiu's boyfriend, later husband Kwan Ho-ching's friend Disqualified from barrister for 5 years due to covering up Hung Long-kiu to escape in Episode 20
Johnson Lee	Shing Wai-yip 成偉業	Billy; An insurance claims adjuster Shing Lap-yan and Leung Kwai-fan's younger son Shing Wai-shun's younger brother Kwan Ho-ching's boyfriend, but later broke up

=== Ko Family ===
Cast	Role	Description
Lau Dan	Ko Wing-tai (Ko Fung) 高永泰 (高峰)	Chairman of Wing Tai Ko Trading Company; A landlord in Mong Kok; Kwan Yuk-sheung's ex-husband Ko Chung-wing and Kwan Ho-ching's father Hung Long-kiu's lover, and believed to be her father Ho Kwok-cheung's boss Lam Chung-pau's enemy Framed by Hung Long-kiu; Killed by Lau Hau-fai in Episode 16
Kenny Wong	Ko Chung-wing 高忠榮	Car dealer owner -> Chairman of Wing Tai Ko Trading Company; Ko Wing-tai's son Kwan Yuk-sheung's stepson Kwan Ho-ching's half-elder brother Lau Hau-wah's friend and boss Lam Chung-pau's enemy Framed Hung Long-kiu; Jailed for one year for cheating insurance claims in Episode 13; Released from jail in Episode 18; Ordered Lau Hau-fai to kill Ko Wing-tai and Kwan Ho-ching; Jailed for life in Episode 20 (Main villain)

=== Other cast ===
Cast	Role	Description
Fala Chen	Hung Long-kiu 熊朗蕎	JoJo; Pole dancer Shing Wai-shun's girlfriend, later wife (Semi-villain)
Timmy Hung	Lau Hau-fai 劉孝輝	Car dealer staff -> Solicitor office assistant Suffered from stuttering Ko Chung-wing's best friend and subordinate Kwan Ho-ching's boyfriend, but later broke up Ordered by Ko Chung-wing to kill Kwan Ho-Ching and Ko Wing-tai; Jailed for life in Episode 20 (Semi-villain)
Eric Li	Po Ying-tat 蒲英達	Hung Long-kiu's ex-boyfriend Blackmailed Hung Long-kiu (Villain)
Ben Wong	Ho Kwok-cheung 何國祥	KC; Ko Wing-tai's assistant Framed by Hung Long-kiu
Sarah Song	Dai Mei-yan 戴美欣	Cherry; Telecom sales -> Electrical appliance sales Best friend of Hung Long-kiu
Matthew Ko	Stanley	Sing Wai-shun's friend Loved Hung Long-kiu
Tracy Ip	Alice	A lawyer Shing Wai-shun's job partner
Mary Hon	Ho Hoon 何歡	Hung Long-kiu and Yan's landlady Mr. Tsui's mistress
Chu Wai-tak	Mr. Tsui 崔生	Mrs. Tsui's husband Ho Hoon's lover Died in Chapter 4
Alice Fung So-bor	Mrs. Tsui 崔太	Mr. Tsui's wife
Yu Tsz-ming	Sham Kung 岑公	Triad leader Lam Chung-pau's leader Ko Wing-tai's friend
Gordon Liu	Lam Chung-pau 林中豹	Triad leader Sham Kung's subordinate Lam Ko Wing-tai and Ko Chung-wing's enemy Made use of Ko Chung-wing; Innocently jailed in Episode 20 for carrying drugs in his car Framed by Tai Kau (Villain)
Sin Ho-ying	Tai Kau 大舊	Triad member Lam Chung-pau's subordinate Bribed by Ko Chung-wing to frame Lam Chung-pau (Villain)
Jeanette Leung	Suet 雪	Lam Chung-pau's daughter Suffered from mental disorder after taking excessive heroin

== Viewership ratings ==
	Week	Episodes	Average Points	Peaking Points	References
1	13 December – 17 December 2010	1 — 5	27	31	
2	20 December – 23 December 2010	6 — 9	28	—	
3	27 December – 31 December 2010	10 — 14	27	—	
4	3 January – 7 January 2011	15 — 20	29	35	

== Awards and nominations ==
=== 45th TVB Anniversary Awards 2011 ===
- Nominated: Best Drama
- Nominated: Best Supporting Actor (Kenny Wong)
