= Shades of Life =

Hong Kong television series

- Official poster
- 我們的天空
- Genre: Modern drama
- Created by: Hong Kong Television Broadcasts Limited
- Written by: Chan Man Keung; Cheung Hoi Hing; Leung Lap Yan
- Starring: Jack Wu; Elaine Yiu; Henry Yu; Zoie Tam
- Theme music composer: Damon Chui
- Opening theme: Shades of Life 我們的天空 by Hoffman Cheng, Ronald Law, Yao Bin, KT
- Country of origin: Hong Kong
- Original language: Cantonese
- No. of episodes: 12

Production
- Producer: Franklin Wong
- Production location: Hong Kong
- Editors: Chan Man Keung; Cheung Hoi Hing; Leung Lap Yan; Yip Sai Choi
- Camera setup: Multi camera
- Running time: 45 minutes
- Production company: TVB

Original release
- Network: Jade; HD Jade
- Release: 20 July – 12 October 2014

Shades of Life
- Traditional Chinese: 我們的天空
- Simplified Chinese: 我们的天空
- Literal meaning: "Our Sky"
Transcriptions
Standard Mandarin
- Hanyu Pinyin: wǒ men de tiān kōng
Yue: Cantonese
- Yale Romanization: ngo moon dic tin hoong
- Jyutping: ngo5 mun4 di1 tin1 hung1

Shades of Life (Traditional Chinese: 我們的天空; literally "Our Sky") (Chinese: 我們的天空; Jyutping: ngo5 mun4 di1 tin1 hung1) is a 2014 Hong Kong modern drama produced by TVB, starring Jack Wu and Elaine Yiu. The series began airing on July 20, 2014 and was broadcast on the following Sundays at 9:00 p.m with 12 episodes in total.

The series centers around the Ko family, a modern Hong Kong family and the ordinary people they encounter. The series tells of the struggles and social issue of ordinary Hong Konger. Each episode does not continue on from the previous episode and each is a new standalone story.

== Main cast ==
=== Ko family ===
- Jack Wu as Ko Ho Pan 高可攀: Tung Ngoi Ting's husband and San Ting's father. He works as a reporter.
- Elaine Yiu as Tung Ngoi Ting 董愛晴: Ko Ho Pan's wife and San Ting's mother. She works as a personal tour person for VIP tourist.
- Henry Yu as Ko Baat Dau 高八斗: Ho Pan and Ho Yen's father. A retired school principal.
- Zoie Tam as Ko Ho Yen 高可人: Ho Pan's younger sister. A design student.
- Albert Lo as Ko San Ting 高山青: Ko Ho Pan and Tung Ngoi Ting's preteen son.

=== Tung family ===
- Albert Law as Tung Fu Gwai 董富貴: Tung Ngoi Ting's arrogant and greedy father who invest in real-estate to make a living.
- Angelina Lo as Mrs. Tung 董太: Tung Ngoi Ting's materialistic and greedy mother.

== Synopsis and cast ==
Episode 1: Succeed 望子成龍

- Mandy Lam as Mrs. Lau 劉太
- Raymond Chiu as Lau Chi Yen 劉志仁
- Andrew Au as Dicky Lau 劉迪奇

Ko San Ting's classmate Dicky is the best in his class, always getting the highest grade on each test, but San Ting does not understand why Dicky always looks sad, tired and worried. On top of that Dicky is never satisfied with his test scores unless he gets a 100.

Episode 2: Same Root 同根生

- Océane Zhu as Wong Mei Fan 王美芬
- Leung Hoi Lam as Chan Bo Yee 陳寶儀

While researching for his next article Ho Pan encounters new immigrant Wong Mei Fan and her preteen daughter Chan Bo Yee. Mei Fan and her daughter has high hopes when they arrive in Hong Kong from mainland China, but the two are soon faced with discrimination, prejudice and struggles.

Episode 3: Influence Life With Life 非常校長

- Ben Wong as Ma Wui Jung 馬匯忠
- Rachel Kan as Ho Yuk San 何玉珊

Ko Ho Yen stands up for a teacher tutoring a student at a fast food restaurant, coincidentally the teacher becomes Ho Pan's next article. Ma Wui Jung was a former high school principal who gave up his steady income job to devote his full-time to tutoring less fortunate students. By following his dream he puts his marriage and family income at risk.

Episode 4: Sub-divided Hero 劏房英雄

- Law Lok Lam as Frankie
- Lau Kong as Fung Bak 豐伯

Ho Pan sees an elderly man named Frankie on television being interviewed by news reporters during a government housing demonstration and tells his boss that he would like to do a magazine article on the elderly man. Frankie, who was a police officer in his younger years, speaks English very well but because of his gambling problems he has to resort to living in poor condition, illegal, sub-divided apartments during his elderly years. He gets by, by collecting the rents for the slum lord. Frankie meets Fung Bak, another elderly man who is looking for cheap housing because his son's family has grown and their little apartment does not have enough room for all of them. Fung Bak, thinking his separation from his family is temporary since they are on the waiting list for public housing, lies to his family that he is living with a friend.

Episode 5: Winter's Fairy-tale 冬天的童話

- Gary Tam as Cheung Huk Kau 張學求
- Skye Chan as Lau Siu Wan 劉小雲
- Owen Cheung as Cheung Si Tim 張思甜

Ho Pan interviews Cheung Huk Kau, a former student of his father who has a rags to riches story to tell. Huk Kau owns and manages a multi-million dollar garbage disposal and cleaning company but his beginnings were very humbled. Due to his mother's illness Huk Kau had to quit school and take over his mother's job full time as a cleaner. Through hard work and the help of his wife he was able to turn his one man company into one of Hong Kong's biggest cleaning companies.

Episode 6: Successor 接班人

- Brian Chu as Cheng Chi Ho 鄭志豪
- Lily Poon as Helen

Ho Pan and his assistant Chi Ho, encounter a car accident in the street, seeing Chi Ho hustle at the accident scene Pan thinks back to when Chi Ho first joined the magazine. Chi Ho overly protective mother Helen got him the job at the magazine and would sit by his desk at work to watch over him. As Chi Ho tags along with Ho Pan to cover stories for their articles he soon learns to become independent and a hard worker. At the same time Ho Pan interviews two recent college graduates who are overly ambitious and want to be on the top of the work force ladder right away.

Episode 7: Dream Dwelling 蝸居夢

- Leanne Li as Ko Lei Ting 郭麗青
- William Chak as Hung Jik 洪翼
- Stanley Cheung as Kwong Chi Hung 鄺志雄
- Gregory Lee as Fung Jun Yin 方津然

Three of Ho Pan's friends, Hung Jik, Kwong Chi Hung and Fung Jun Yin are desperate to buy a flat for their marriages. Ho Pan refers them to his father-in-law Tung Fu Gwai, who likes to invest in real-estate and then re-sell it at a higher price. The three friends agree on the price and decide to go in together to buy Fu Gwai's flat. They each raise their share of the money by taking out their savings and borrowing from family, but on the day of the sale Fu Gwai raises the sale price because according to him recent real-estate price in Hong Kong has risen. With their dream of owning their own flat gone, Hung Jik decides to move to Singapore to be with his fiancée.

Episode 8: So Close, So Far 這麼近, 那麼遠

Episode 9: Father and I 公公與我

- Elliot Ngok as Cheung Kit 張健

Episode 10: What Is Good 餘何是好

- Det Dik as Leung 亮
- Wong Hin Chung as Cyu 柱
- Kinko Koo as Chum 沈

Episode 11: Sunset Warrior 夕陽戰士

- Tsui Gwok Hing as Den Wong 電王
- Stephen Wong Ka-lok as Wai San 惠新
- Leo Lee as Wai Kit 惠健

Episode 12: Homeward Bound 歸去來兮

- Mat Yeung as Kwong Chi Hung 鄺志雄
- Jason Chan Chi-san as Chris

== Viewership Ratings ==
Episode	Date	Average ratings
1	July 20, 2014	
2	July 27, 2014	
3	August 3, 2014	
4	August 10, 2014	
5	August 17, 2014	
6	August 24, 2014	
7	September 7, 2014	
8	September 14, 2014	
9	September 21, 2014	
10	September 28, 2014	
11	October 5, 2014	
12	October 12, 2014	

== Controversies ==
Shades of Life received over 1500 complaints in its 2nd week of airing. The series was slammed for depicting Hong Kong citizens in a negatively and inaccurate portrayal of stereotypes. Also providing misleading information when depicting other country societies, such as episode 1 where it is mentioned about the difference between Hong Kong students and American students, one of the characters ask "why Hong Kong students carry backpacks to school when in the United States students does not carry backpacks because everything they need is already provided by the school".
