= At Home with Love =

- Poster
- 樓住有情人
- Genre: Modern Drama
- Starring: Lawrence Ng; Yoyo Mung; Natalie Tong; Chung King Fai; Raymond Cho
- Opening theme: "逐格重播" by Sharon Chan
- Country of origin: Hong Kong
- Original language: Cantonese
- No. of episodes: 20

Production
- Running time: 45 minutes (approx.)

Original release
- Network: TVB
- Release: October 9 – November 3, 2006

At Home with Love (Traditional Chinese: 樓住有情人) is a TVB modern drama series broadcast in October 2006.

== Synopsis ==
Chung Bong (Chung King Fai) left his real estate business Trustworthy Property to his son Chung Chi Leung (Lawrence Ng). The business has been well established in the area. Through Bong, Elaine Tsui Chi-Ling (Yoyo Mung) becomes a real estate agent working for Leung and they soon fall in love and becomes his girlfriend. The business has been doing well until a large competing firm enters their area, attempting to force them out of business. Leung soon faces many problems: his business, his health, his relationship with his father, and his girlfriend. Will he be able to make it through?

== Cast ==
| Cast | Role | Description |
|---|---|---|
| Lawrence Ng | Chung Chi-Leung 鍾志良 | Trustworthy Property Real Estate Agent Owner; Chung Bong's son. Tsui Chi-Ling's boyfriend. |
| Yoyo Mung | Tsui Chi-Ling (Elaine) 徐芷羚 | Real Estate Agent; Chung Chi-Leung's girlfriend. |
| Natalie Tong | Choy Ying-Ying (Yuki) 蔡盈盈 | Real Estate Agent |
| Chung King Fai | Chung Bong 鍾邦 | Retired Real Estate Agent; Ching Chi-Leung's father. |
| Raymond Cho | Fok Ming-Hin (Henry) 霍明軒 | Real Estate Agent; Chung Chi-Leung's rival. |
| Nancy Wu | Fong Sin-Man (Cindy) 方倩汶 | Chung Chi-Leung's ex-girlfriend. |
| Benz Hui | Ying Yan 應仁 | Real Estate Agent |
| Halina Tam | Chow Ching-Yan (Joey) 周靜欣 | Real Estate Agent |
| Charles Szeto | Tsui Yat-Tsun 徐日進 | Tsui Chi-Ling's younger brother. |

== Viewership ratings ==
| | Week | Episode | Average Points | Peaking Points | References |
|---|---|---|---|---|---|
| 1 | October 9–15, 2006 | 1 — 5 | 28 | — | |
| 2 | October 18–22, 2006 | 6 — 10 | 28 | — | |
| 3 | October 23–27, 2006 | 11 — 15 | 29 | — | |
| 4 | October 30 - November 3, 2006 | 16 — 20 | 30 | 33 | |

== Analysis ==
The Hong Kong Economic Times said that the television series was numerous Hongkongers believed that "having a home is only possible if you own a flat" and that after the "financial turmoil", numerous property owners found their negative equity flats to be a burden. The newspaper said the television series shows viewers the "delicate relationship" between "owning a flat" and a "having a home", emphasising that "owning a flat" is not necessary for "having a home" because "family affection is more precious".

== Awards and nominations ==
39th TVB Anniversary Awards (2006)

- "Best Drama"
- "Best Actor in a Leading Role" (Lawrence Ng - Chung Chi-Leung)
- "Best Actress in a Supporting Role" (Nancy Wu - Cindy Fong Sin-Man)
