= Yoyo Mung =

Hong Kong actress

- 蒙嘉慧
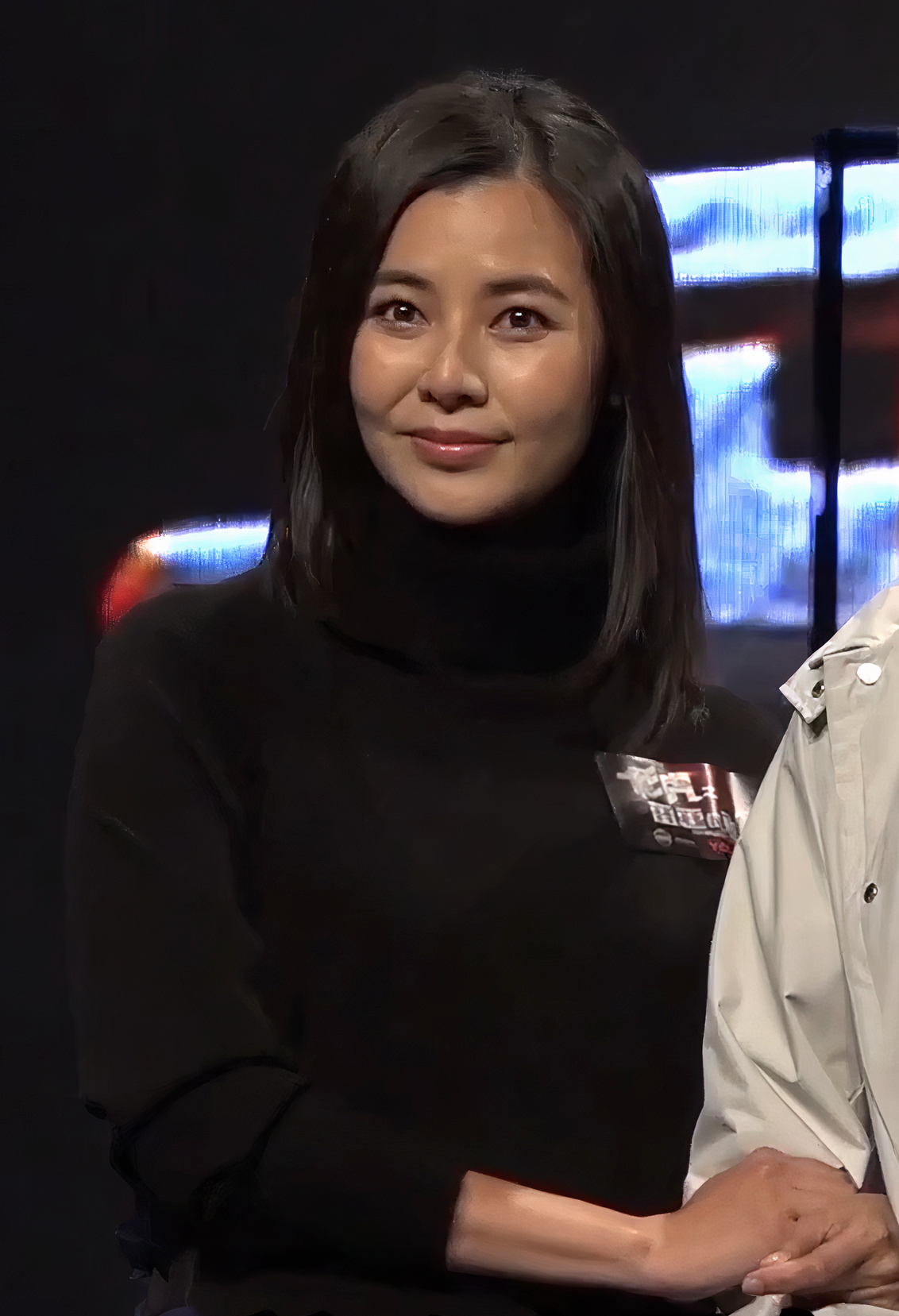
- Myung at the first press conference of Flying Tiger 2
- Born: Mung Ka-wai; 3 August 1975; British Hong Kong
- Education: S.K.H. Ling Oi Primary School; Fung Kai No.1 Secondary School; New Territories Heung Yee Kuk Yuen Long District Secondary School
- Occupation: Actress
- Years active: 1994–present
- Agents: TVB (2003–2013); HKTV (2013–2014)
- Spouse: Ekin Cheng (m. 2013)

Chinese name
- Chinese: 蒙嘉慧
Transcriptions
Standard Mandarin
- Hanyu Pinyin: Méng Jiāhuì
Yue: Cantonese
- Jyutping: mung4 gaa1 wai6

Yoyo Mung Ka-wai (Chinese: 蒙嘉慧) is a Hong Kong actress. She was signed to TVB until March 2013, having starred in various TVB television shows, including Forensic Heroes I and II.

== Career ==
After graduating from Form 5, Mung worked as a bank clerk.

Upon graduating from high school, Mung started work in an advertising agency.

Mung starred in many television drama serials and movies, including a Cat 3 film "Not the Female School". Her performance in "Expect the Unexpected" earned her a nomination for Best Newcomer in the 18th Hong Kong TVB Awards.

Mung declined to renew her artist contract with TVB in March 2013.

Mung was among the thousands who protested the Hong Kong government's decision to deny HKTV's free-to-air broadcast license in October 2013.

== Personal life ==
She married actor and singer Ekin Cheng on 28 January 2013.

== Filmography ==
Year	Title	Role	Notes
1994	The Third Full Moon	Lunatic	
1994	Screwball '94	Schoolgirl	
1998	Expect the Unexpected	Mandy	Nominated – Hong Kong Film Award for Best New Performer
1998	A Hero Never Dies	Yoyo	
1998	Love in Shanghai		
1999	Who's the Assassin	Kim Chui	
1999	Believe It or Not		
1999	Running Out of Time	Leung Yuen-ting	
1999	Sealed with a Kiss	Mandy	
1999	Rave Fever	Ashley Chow	
2000	Super Car Criminals	Michael's woman	
2000	Killer	Ivy	
2000	Hong Kong History X	Sandy	
2000	Eternal Love	Ivy Wong	
2000	The Teacher Without Chalk	May Lo	
2001	Wishful Milenio	Summer	
2001	Doctor No...	Ann	
2001	Ultimatum	May	
2003	Sai Kung Story	Wing	
2004	Cop Unbowed	Kelly Lam	
2004	Sex and the Beauties	Ngai Him / Danger	
2004	Unplugging Nightmare	Sylvia / Yvonne	
2005	Where Is Mama's Boy?	Chao Jun	aka My Crazy Mother
2006	The Room		
2007	Fight for Love		

=== Television ===
Year	Title	Role	Notes/Ref.
2000	The Green Hope	Siu Lai-wah	
2000	Healing Hands II	Ho Sam-yin (Tracy)	Nominated – Best Actress; Nominated – My Favourite TV Character
2001	Mission in Trouble	Koh Bing Bing	
2002	Burning Flame II	Kong Yat-nga (Yan)	Nominated – Best Actress; Nominated – My Favourite TV Character
2002	Good Against Evil	Chau Dan-dan	
2003	The 'W' Files	Bak So	Nominated – Best Actress; Nominated – My Favourite TV Character
2004	Armed Reaction IV	Fong Ching (Sunnie)	
2004	Split Second	Pang Wai	Nominated – Best Actress; Nominated – My Favourite TV Character
2004	Kung Fu Soccer	Yip Yuet	
2005	The Charm Beneath	Ng Yi-fong	Nominated – Best Actress
2005	Healing Hands III	Ho Sam-yin (Tracy)	Guest star
2005	Princess Sheng Ping	Ouyang Ying	
2006	Forensic Heroes	Leung Siu-yau (Nicole)	Nominated – Best Actress (Top 20); Nominated – My Favourite Female Character (Top 20)
2006	At Home With Love	Tsui Ji-ling (Elaine)	
2007	Heart of Greed	Shui Ming-ha (Sui Mak-mak)	Nominated – Best Supporting Actress (Top 5)
2007	Fathers and Sons	Kam Mei-juen	
2007	The Ultimate Crime Fighter	Keung Nga-yue (Ginger)	Nominated – Best Actress (Top 20); Nominated – My Favourite Female Character (Top 20)
2008	Forensic Heroes II	Leung Siu-yau (Nicole)	
2008	Last One Standing	Lei Pui-ka (Carmen)	
2009	The Threshold of a Persona	Yip On-kei (Angel)	
2009	ICAC Investigators 2009	Zoe	
2010–2011	Links to Temptation	Kwan Ho-ching (Jessie)	
2011	Only You	Mak Yat-man (Mandy)	Nominated – TVB Anniversary Award for Best Actress(Top 15); Nominated – TVB Anniversary Award for My Favourite Female Character (Top 15)
2013	A Great Way to Care II	Cheuk Wai-kiu (Lois)	
2014	Ruse of Engagement	Yip Ting (Phoenix)	
2015	Elite Brigade III		Airing on 3 October 2015
2019	Flying Tiger 2	Au Yeung Man Yi	
