= Last One Standing (Hong Kong TV series) =

2008 Hong Kong television series

- Official poster
- 與敵同行
- Genre: Drama thriller Mystery
- Created by: Amy Wong
- Written by: Choi Ting-ting
- Starring: Roger Kwok; Kevin Cheng; Yoyo Mung
- Opening theme: "Last One Standing" (與敵同行)
- Composer: Tang Chi-wai
- Country of origin: Hong Kong
- Original language: Cantonese
- No. of episodes: 22

Production
- Executive producer: Amy Wong
- Camera setup: Multi camera
- Running time: 45 minutes (each)
- Production company: TVB

Original release
- Network: Jade, HD Jade
- Release: 22 September – 7 October 2008

Last One Standing
- intertitle (from left to right: Yin, Carmen, Hei)
- Traditional Chinese: 與敵同行
- Simplified Chinese: 与敌同行
- Literal meaning: "Walking with the enemy"
Transcriptions
Standard Mandarin
- Hanyu Pinyin: Yú Dí Tóng Xíng
Yue: Cantonese
- Jyutping: Jyu5 Dik6 Tung4 Hang4

Last One Standing (Chinese: 與敵同行; literally "walking with the enemy") is a 2008 Hong Kong television drama serial created by Amy Wong and produced by TVB. Premiering on Hong Kong's Jade and HD Jade channels on 22 September 2008, the serial ran for 22 episodes.

The serial tells the story of ex-convict Hei (Kevin Cheng), a young man who was sentenced to ten years in prison after he was framed for murdering his stepfather. When Hei is released, he exacts vengeance on his cousin and best friend Yin (Roger Kwok), who was a key witness of the murder.

== Synopsis ==
Time was served for a crime he did not commit.
After ten years, can he discover the truth behind his stepfather's murder?

Former Hong Kong Correctional Services personnel Cheung Sing-hei (Kevin Cheng) was sent to prison for murdering his stepfather. The key witness of the case turns out to be his cousin and best friend Tong Lap-yin (Roger Kwok). Ten years later, Hei is released from prison. Yin is now one of the most influential people in the city while Hei's reputation and future are in ruins. Feeling extremely frustrated and harbouring suspicions about the case ten years ago, he is desperate to find out the truth behind his stepfather's death. After some investigation, Hei realises who the real killer was, but there appears to be no motive. More importantly, evidence is also lacking. This story is about how Hei exposes the truth and ultimately proves his innocence.

== Cast ==
Cast	Role	Description
Roger Kwok	Tong Lap-yin 唐立言	Insurance Adjuster/Owner; Tong Hok-Yan and Tong So Lai-Fun's adopted son. Cheung Sing-Hei's older cousin and enemy. Lei Pui-ka's boyfriend. (Main Villain)
Kevin Cheng	Cheung Sing-hei 張承希	Ex-Convict; Convenience Store Clerk/Insurance Adjuster; Tong Lap-Yin's younger cousin and enemy. Lei Pui-Ka's lover. Ma Oi-Lam's ex-boyfriend.
Yoyo Mung	Carmen Lei Pui-ka 利珮嘉	News Reporter; Tong Lap-Yin's girlfriend. Cheung Sing-Hei's admirer.
Kiki Sheung	Lau Kit-yee 劉潔儀	Insurance Agent; Tsang Tsu-Leung's wife. Cheung Sing-Hei and Cheung Jung-See's mother.
Elaine Yiu	Mandy Tong Hoi-man 唐凱敏	Insurance Adjuster; Tong Lap-Yin's stepsister. Alex's girlfriend.
Rosanne Lui (呂珊)	Tong Cheung Lai-fun 唐張麗芬	Parkinson's Disease Patient; Tong Hok-Yan's wife. Tong Hoi-Man's mother. Tong Lap-Yin's foster mother.
Yvonne Ho (何綺雲)	Cheung Chung-sze 張頌思	Cheung Sing-Hei's younger sister. Yeung Kin-Yip's wife.
Ellesmere Choi	Yeung Kin-yip 楊健業	Hong Kong District Councilor; Cheung Jung-See's husband.
Macy Chan (陳美詩)	Kelly Ma Oi-lam 馬愛琳	Accountant; Cheung Shing-Hei's ex-girlfriend. Lei Pui-Ka's friend. Tong Lap-Yin's assistant.
Mak Cheung-ching (麥長青)	Poon Chi-kan 潘志勤	Insurance Adjuster; Tong Lap-Yin's orphanage friend/colleague. Cheung Sing-Hei's friend. Fiona's boyfriend.
Chun Wong (秦煌)	Tong Hok-yan 唐學仁	Tong So Lai-Fun's husband. Tong Hoi-Man's father. Tong Lap-Yin's foster father.
Lai Suen (黎宣)	Tong Lee So-ngoh 唐李素娥	Tong Hok-Yan's mother.
Law Lok Lam (羅樂林)	Tsang Tsu-leung 曾樹樑	Lau Git-Yee's deceased husband. Cheung Sing-Hei and Cheung Jung-See's stepfather.
Eileen Yeow	Sandy Lei Pui-shan 利珮珊	Lei Pui-Ka's older sister.
Fiona Yuen	Fiona	Flight Attendant; Poon Chi-Kan's girlfriend. Lei Pui-Ka's friend.
Eddie Li	Alex	Insurance Adjuster; Tong Hoi-Man's boyfriend.
Sherming Yiu (姚樂怡)	So Lai-Fa 蘇麗花	Tsang Tsu-Leung's lover.

== Viewership ratings ==
	Week	Episode	Average Points	Peaking Points	References
1	22–26 September 2008	1 — 5	28	31	
2	29 September - 3 October 2008	6 — 10	27	29	
3	6–10 October 2008	11 — 15	28	32	
4	13–17 October 2008	16 — 20	31	33	
4	18 October 2008	21 — 22	31	34	

== Awards and nominations ==
41st TVB Anniversary Awards (2008)

- "Best Drama"
- "Best Actor in a Leading Role" (Kevin Cheng - Cheung Sing-Hei)
- "My Favourite Male Character Role" (Kevin Cheng - Cheung Sing-Hei)

== International Broadcast ==
- Malaysia - 8TV (Malaysia)
