= Be Home for Dinner =

Hong Kong television series

- Official poster
- 誰家灶頭無煙火
- Genre: Modern Sitcom
- Starring: Elliot Ngok; Jason Chan; Kristal Tin; Stephen Au; Yvonne Lam; Helen Ma; Queenie Chu; Océane Zhu; Becky Lee; Matt Yeung; Dickson Lee; Katy Kung
- Original language: Cantonese
- No. of episodes: 158

Production
- Production location: Hong Kong
- Camera setup: Multi-camera
- Running time: 22 minutes (approx.)
- Production company: TVB

Original release
- Network: TVB Jade
- Release: 21 March – 30 October 2011

Related
- Show Me the Happy; Til Love Do Us Lie

Be Home for Dinner (Traditional Chinese: (誰家灶頭無煙火) is an TVB modern sitcom series.

== Synopsis ==
Chung Kwok-Chu (Elliot Ngok) is a renowned food critic and an assistant editor-in-chief of a newspaper, Ko Jim Daily. When his son, Si-Hon (Jason Chan) returns from Canada, Chu is disappointed to find that Si Hon intends to become a chef rather than taking up a professional career. His attempts to guide his son away are thwarted when Shum Bui-yee (Kristal Tin), a well-known and respected chef, reluctantly accepts Si-Hon as her assistant.

At the Chung household, Chu has to face his bickering younger brother Kwok-Tung (Stephen Au) and Si-Hon's aunt, Suen Ma-lei (Yvonne Lam), his second wife Dau Kwai Sum (Helen Ma) who worries that she is not doing enough as a stepmother, and how children, half-siblings Si-Hon and Si-Nga (Katy Kung) do not understand fine foods as he does. As members of his family manage to find a way to get along, Chu and his family find that friends and co-workers changing their family dynamic again.

== Cast ==
- Elliot Ngok as Chung Kwok-chu, Sam's father, a magazine editor-in-chief
- Jason Chan as Si Hon "Sam" Chung, an aspiring pastry chef
- Kristal Tin as Carmen Sum (Sum Bui-yee), Sam's master
- Stephen Au as Chung Kwok-tung, Kwok-chu's younger brother
- Seth Leslie as Joe Smith, Sam's best friend from Canada
- Yvonne Lam as Mari Suen, Kwok-chu's sister-in-law from his first marriage, Sam's maternal aunt
- Helen Ma as Dau Kwai-Sum, Chu's second wife and Si-Na's mother, Sam's stepmother
- Katy Kung as Si Nga "Julia" Chung, Sam's younger half-sister
- Queenie Chu as Jackie Yeung
- Océane Zhu as Susan Nin
- Becky Lee as Tong Jing-jing (Sum Hoi-yee), a freelance writer, revealed to be Carmen's estranged younger sister
- Dickson Lee as Chin Dai-kwan
- Mat Yeung as Tin Hoi
- Lily Ho as Tseun Ding-kei, a dedicated writer

== Awards and nominations ==
=== 45th TVB Anniversary Awards 2011 ===
- Nominated: Best Drama
- Nominated: Best Actor (Stephen Au)
- Nominated: Best Actress (Kristal Tin)
- Nominated: Best Supporting Actor (Matt Yeung)
- Nominated: Best Supporting Actress (Yvonne Lam)
- Nominated: My Favourite Male Character (Stephen Au)
- Nominated: My Favourite Male Character (Jason Chan)
- Nominated: My Favourite Female Character (Kristal Tin)
- Nominated: Most Improved Male Artiste (Jason Chan)
- Nominated: Most Improved Male Artiste (Matt Yeung)
- Nominated: Most Improved Female Artiste (Katy Kung)

== Viewership ratings ==
	Week	Episodes	Average Points	Peaking Points	References
1	March 21–25, 2011	1 — 5	25	—	
2	March 28–31, 2011	6 — 9	21	—	
3	April 4–8, 2011	10 — 14	24	—	
4	April 11–15, 2011	15 — 19	23	—	
5	April 18–22, 2011	20 — 24	23	—	
6	April 25–28, 2011	25 — 28	23	—	
7	May 2–6, 2011	29 — 33	24	—	
8	May 9–13, 2011	34 — 38	24	—	
9	May 16–20, 2011	39 — 43	24	—	
10	May 23–27, 2011	44 — 48	24	—	
11	May 30 - June 3, 2011	49 — 53	24	—	
12	June 6–10, 2011	54 — 58	25	—	
13	June 13–17, 2011	59 — 63	24	—	
14	June 20–24, 2011	64 — 68	24	—	
15	June 27 - July 1, 2011	69 — 73	24	—	
16	July 4–8, 2011	74 — 78	25	—	
17	July 11–15, 2011	79 — 83	25	—	
18	July 18–22, 2011	84 — 88	24	—	
19	July 25–29, 2011	89 — 93	23	—	
20	August 1–5, 2011	94 — 98	23	—	
21	August 8–12, 2011	99 — 103	23	—	
22	August 15–19, 2011	104 — 108	24	—	
23	August 22–26, 2011	109 — 113	25	—	
24	August 29 - September 2, 2011	114 — 118	25	—	
25	September 5–9, 2011	119 — 123	26	—	
26	September 12–16, 2011	124 — 128	24	—	
27	September 19–23, 2011	129 — 133	25	—	
28	September 26–30, 2011	134 — 138	27	—	
29	October 4–7, 2011	139 — 142	25	—	
30	October 10–14, 2011	143 — 147	25	—	
31	October 17–21, 2011	148 — 152	25	—	
32	October 24–28, 2011	153 — 158	27	—	
32	October 30, 2011	159 — 160	27	29	
