= The Stew of Life =

Hong Kong television series

- Official poster
- 有營煮婦
- Genre: Family comedy
- Starring: Louise Lee; Christine Ng; Chung King Fai; Fala Chen; Mak Cheung-ching; Timmy Hung
- Opening theme: "絕配的一對" by Fala Chen
- Country of origin: Hong Kong
- Original language: Cantonese
- No. of episodes: 30

Production
- Producer: Amy Wong
- Running time: 45 minutes (approx.)

Original release
- Network: TVB
- Release: September 7 – October 18, 2009

The Stew of Life
- Traditional Chinese: 有營煮婦
Transcriptions

The Stew of Life (Traditional Chinese: 有營煮婦) is a TVB family comedy series. It stars Louise Lee, Christine Ng, Chung King Fai and Fala Chen as the main leads.

== Plot ==
Upon returning from a trip with her husband Ng Man Tak (Chung King Fai), cookery teacher Lo Siu Lai (Lee Sze Kei, Louise) is shocked to find that her little daughter Ng Choi Ni (Chen Fala) has started cohabiting with a homosexually-inclined colleague, Lau Tat Yan (Hung Tin Ming), while her divorced sister Lo Siu Mei (Ng Wing Mei) is seemingly caught up in a love triangle between tenant Yau Kai (Mak Cheung Ching) and her ex-husband. By and by, Tak is forced to retire early and stays at home all day with nothing to do. Lai, on the other hand, is lucky enough to have the opportunity to host a culinary show on TV. Everything seems to have happened too fast, but this does not leave Lai frustrated and accursed. Instead she tries to get around every problem with even more patience and dedication, which however is not appreciated by Tak. The bickering continues until Lai eventually thinks of a good way to tackle Tak.

== Cast ==
=== Ng Family ===
| Cast | Role | Description |
|---|---|---|
| Chung King Fai | Ng Man Tak 吳敏德 | Lo Siu Lai's husband Ng Choi Nei's father |
| Louise Lee | Lo Siu Lai 魯小麗 | Ng Man Tak's wife Ng Choi Nei's mother Lo Siu Mei's older sister |
| Fala Chen | Ng Choi Nei 吳采妮 (Charlie) | Ng Man Tak and Lo Siu Lai's daughter Lee Sing Kei's ex-girlfriend Lau Tak Yan's girlfriend then wife |
| Christine Ng | Lo Siu Mei 魯小美 (May/ Miss Lo) | Lo Siu Lai's younger sister Yau Kai's girlfriend |

=== Yau Family ===
| Cast | Role | Description |
|---|---|---|
| Mak Cheung-ching (麥長青) | Yau Kai 游佳 | Lo Siu Mei's boyfriend Yau Yee's younger brother |
| Yvonne Ho (何綺雲) | Yau Yee 游怡 | Yau Kai's older sister |
| Manna Chan | Yau Kam So Ngor 游金素娥 | Yau Kai and Yau Yee's mother |
| Lawrence Ng (吳諾弘) | Peter | Yau Yee's son |

=== Other cast ===
| Cast | Role | Description |
|---|---|---|
| Timmy Hung | Lau Tak Yan 劉達人 (Ryan) | Ng Choi Nei's boyfriend then husband |
| Johnson Lee | Lee Sing Kei 李成基 | Ng Choi Nei's ex-boyfriend |
| Stephen Huynh | Nam Tin Cheung 藍天翔 (Daniel) | Top Magazine's designer |
| Ken Wong (王凱韋) | Ma Cho Tik 馬祖迪 | Lo Siu Mei's dream man Yau Kai's good friend |
| Gill Mohindepaul Singh | Ha Lei Man 夏利民 (Henry) | Top Magazine boss |
| Shermon Tang | Frankie | Top Magazine worker Henry's assistant |
| Candy Cheung (張雪芹) | Angel | Lo Siu Mei's flower shop assistant |
| Geoffrey Wong (黃子雄) | 劉嘉亨 (Ken) | Lo Sui Mei's ex-husband |

== Awards and nominations ==
TVB Anniversary Awards (2009)

- Best Drama
- Best Actress (Louise Lee)
- Best Supporting Actor (Mak Cheung-ching)
- Best Supporting Actress (Fala Chen)
- Best Supporting Actress (Christine Ng)
- My Favourite Female Character (Louise Lee)
- My Favourite Female Character (Fala Chen)
- My Favourite Female Character (Christine Ng)
- Most Improved Actor (Johnson Lee)

== Viewership ratings ==
| | Week | Episodes | Average Points | Peaking Points | References |
|---|---|---|---|---|---|
| 1 | September 7–11, 2009 | 1 — 5 | 30 | 34 | |
| 2 | September 14–18, 2009 | 6 — 10 | 31 | 38 | |
| 3 | September 21–25, 2009 | 11 — 15 | 28 | — | |
| 4 | September 28 - October 2, 2009 | 16 — 20 | 28 | 31 | |
| 5 | October 5–9, 2009 | 21 — 25 | 30 | 33 | |
| 6 | October 12–16, 2009 | 26 — 29 | 32 | 36 | |
| 6 | October 18, 2009 | 30 | 29 | 31 | |
