= Only You (2011 TV series) =

2011 Hong Kong television series

- Official poster
- 只有您
- Genre: Drama; Romance
- Written by: Choi Ting-ting; Wong Yuk-tak
- Starring: Louise Lee; Yoyo Mung; Kevin Cheng; Natalie Tong; Mak Cheung-ching; Kristal Tin; Lai Lok-yi
- Theme music composer: Yip Siu-chung
- Opening theme: "I Do" by Cherry Ho
- Country of origin: Hong Kong
- Original language: Cantonese
- No. of episodes: 29 (Hong Kong); 30(If you split the last episode in two, which equals 45 minutes each or overseas)

Production
- Executive producer: Amy Wong
- Production location: Hong Kong
- Camera setup: Multi camera
- Running time: 45 minutes (per episode)
- Production company: TVB

Original release
- Network: TVB Jade
- Release: 21 February – 2 April 2011

Related
- 7 Days in Life; Relic of an Emissary

Only You
- intertitle
- Chinese: Only You只有您
- Literal meaning: "Only You"
Transcriptions
Standard Mandarin
- Hanyu Pinyin: Only You Zhǐ Yǒu Nín
Yue: Cantonese
- Jyutping: Only You Zi2 Jau5 Nei5

Only You (Traditional Chinese: 只有您) is a 2011 Hong Kong television drama that was aired on Hong Kong's TVB Jade and TVB HD Jade channels. The drama began broadcast on 21 February 2011 and ran for 30 episodes. It stars Louise Lee, Yoyo Mung and Kevin Cheng as the main leads.

A Television Broadcasts Limited (TVB) production, the drama is written by Choi Ting-ting and Wong Yuk-tang, with Amy Wong serving as the executive producer. Only You is set in modern-day Hong Kong and centers on the wedding planners working under Only You Wedding Services and bridal shop agency. Twelve different stories are told in an episode format regarding the agency's clients.

== Synopsis ==
An unrelenting and boastful woman, Mandy (Yoyo Mung) wants to be a wedding planner after she gets the axe, simply for its simple job nature and attractive income. Sze-tim (Louise Lee), an expert in the trade and a person of principles, declines to take her as a student as she sees through Mandy's motive, but Mandy will not yield. She tries her best to please Sze-tim's younger brother, Sze-chai (Mak Cheung-ching) and his wife, Phoebe (Kristal Tin) who employ her as a coordinator in their bridal wear company.

Mandy is determined to do something big in her career, but the appearance of photographer, Summer (Kevin Cheng) makes her rethink the meaning of life. Mandy and Summer have met all kinds of people at work, from couples in quarrel to couples in distress, neurotic brides to lovers with disabilities. Every couple has a unique love story to tell; in front of Mandy and Summer they exchange wedding vows in an atmosphere of beauty and serenity.

Although Mandy and Summer love each other, their different outlook on life begins to tear them apart. Should lovers stand firm with principles or let go for love?

== Stories ==
1. Hard on the Sister-in-law (難為大姑奶)
2. My Despicable Ex-boyfriend (我的賤格前男友)
3. Ex-convict's Wedding (釋囚的婚禮)
4. Amazing Love (驚情)
5. I Have a Dream (我有一個夢想)
6. Perfection of Deformity (殘缺的完美)
7. Her Husband is a Boss (佢老公系大佬)
8. A Wealthy Family's Wedding (豪門婚禮)
9. Mom, I'm Getting Married (媽媽我嫁了)
10. My Indian Father-in-law (我的印度老爺)
11. The Last Wedding (最後的花嫁)
12. Dreams of the Closing Year (暮年之夢)

== Cast ==
- Louise Lee as Chong Sze-tim, Only You's matchmaker.
- Yoyo Mung as Mandy "Ah Man" Mak, Only You's assistant coordinator.
- Kevin Cheng as Summer Ha, Only You's photographer.
- Natalie Tong as Ma Hiu-ching, Chong Sze-tim's daughter
- Mak Cheung-ching as Chong Sze-chai, Phoebe's husband and co-owner of Only You.
- Kristal Tin as Phoebe Szeto, the co-owner of Only You.

== Awards and nominations ==
=== 45th TVB Anniversary Awards 2011 ===
- Nominated: Best Drama
- Nominated: Best Actress (Louise Lee)
- Nominated: Best Actress (Yoyo Mung)
- Nominated: My Favourite Female Character (Louise Lee)
- Nominated: My Favourite Female Character (Yoyo Mung)
- Nominated: Most Improved Male Artiste (Jason Chan)
- Nominated: Most Improved Male Artiste (Matt Yeung)

== Viewership ratings ==
	Week	Episodes	Average Points	Peaking Points	References
1	February 21–25, 2011	1 — 5	28	31	
2	February 28 - March 3, 2011	6 — 9	27	—	
3	March 7–11, 2011	10 — 14	27	—	
4	March 14–18, 2011	15 — 19	29	32	
5	March 21–25, 2011	20 — 24	30	35	
6	March 28–31, 2011	25 — 28	30	—	
6	April 2, 2011	29	30	32	
