= List of TVB series (2005) =

This is a list of series released by TVB in 2005.

== Top ten drama series in ratings ==
The following is a list of the highest-rated drama series released by TVB in 2005. The list includes premiere week, final week ratings, as well as the average overall count of live Hong Kong viewers (in millions).

Highest-rated drama series of 2005
Rank	English title	Chinese title	Average	Peak	Premiere week	Final week	HK viewers (millions)
1	Jewel in the Palace	大長今	36	50	25	41	2.90
2	Wars of In-laws	我的野蠻奶奶	34	38	34	35	2.23
3	Life Made Simple	阿旺新傳	34	43	30	41	2.20
4	The Academy	學警雄心	34	37	32	35	2.20
5	Love Bond	心花放	32	40	30	36	2.12
6	The Prince's Shadow	御用閒人	32	40	30	34	2.10
7	Just Love	老婆大人	32	37	32	32	2.10
8	Scavengers' Paradise	同撈同煲	32	37	31	32	2.09
9	Revolving Doors of Vengeance	酒店風雲	32	40	32	33	2.07
10	The Gentle Crackdown	秀才遇著兵	31	37	31	35	2.03

== First line series ==
These dramas aired in Hong Kong from 8:00 to 9:00 pm, Monday to Friday on TVB.

Airing date	English title (Chinese title)	Number of episodes	Main cast	Theme song (T) Sub-theme song (ST)	Genre	Notes	Official website
6 Dec 2004- 9 Jan 2005	Kung Fu Soccer 功夫足球	25	Dicky Cheung, Joey Yung, Anthony Wong, Sandra Ng, Bowie Lam	T: "足球小將" (Dicky Cheung); ST: "貪慕虛榮" (Joey Yung)	Modern drama	China series	Official website
10 Jan- 13 Feb	Wong Fei Hung – Master of Kung Fu 我師傅係黃飛鴻	25	Bosco Wong, Sammul Chan, Rain Li, Kenneth Ma	T: "鴻飛萬里" (Alan Tam)	Period action	Released overseas on November 7, 2004. Copyright notice: 2004.	Official website
14 Feb- 11 Mar	Lost in the Chamber of Love 西廂奇緣	20	Ron Ng, Myolie Wu, Michelle Ye, Kenneth Ma	T: "嫁衣裳" (Ron Ng & Myolie Wu)	Costume drama	Released overseas on December 6, 2004. Copyright notice: 2004.	Official website
14 Mar- 8 Apr	The Prince's Shadow 御用閒人	20	Adam Cheng, Sheren Tang, Tavia Yeung, Joyce Tang, Marco Ngai	T: "絕世閒人" (Adam Cheng)	Costume drama	Copyright notice: 2004.	Official website
11 Apr- 6 May	Scavengers' Paradise 同撈同煲	20	Roger Kwok, Myolie Wu, Kenneth Ma, Cherie Kong	T: "沙煲兄弟闖情關" (Roger Kwok, Myolie Wu, Kenneth Ma, & Cherie Kong)	Period drama	Copyright notice: 2004.	Official website
9 May- 3 Jun	Just Love 老婆大人	20	Jessica Hsuan, Sunny Chan, Dave Wong, Patrick Tang, Selena Li		Modern drama	Prequel to 2009's Just Love II. Copyright notice: 2004.	Official website
6 Jun- 1 Jul	The Gâteau Affairs 情迷黑森林	20	Joe Ma, Myolie Wu, Annie Man, Bobo Chan, Jack Wu	T: "調味人生" (Bobo Chan)	Modern drama		Official website
3 Jul- 29 Jul	Fantasy Hotel 開心賓館	20	Michael Tao, Melissa Ng, Wayne Lai, Angela Tong, Michael Tong	T: "再高一線" (Michael Tong)	Modern drama		Official website
1 Aug- 9 Sep	Yummy Yummy (Food For Life)	30	Charmaine Sheh, Kevin Cheng, Raymond Lam, Tavia Yeung	T: "與朋友共" (Charmaine Sheh, Kevin Cheng, Raymond Lam, & Tavia Yeung); ST: "三角兩面" (Kevin Cheng)	Modern drama	Co-production with Singapore.	Official website
12 Sep- 14 Oct	Hidden Treasures 翻新大少 (or 鴨寮街的金蛋)	30	Bobby Au Yeung, Sonija Kwok, Wayne Lai, Anne Heung, Shirley Yeung	T: "你有寶" (Gigi Leung); ST: "沒有月亮的日子" (Gigi Leung)	Modern drama	Released overseas on May 24, 2004. Copyright notice: 2004.	Official website
17 Oct- 25 Nov	The Charm Beneath 胭脂水粉	30	Moses Chan, Gigi Lai, Yoyo Mung, Anne Heung	T: "鏡花" (Gigi Lai); ST: "痕跡" (Moses Chan)	Period drama	Anniversary series	Official website
28 Nov- 30 Dec	The Herbalist's Manual 本草藥王	25	Frankie Lam, Michelle Ye, Kenneth Ma, Selena Li	T: "世上無難事" (Frankie Lam)	Costume drama	Released overseas on June 20, 2005.	Official website

== Second line series ==
These dramas aired in Hong Kong from 9:00 to 10:00 pm, Monday to Friday on TVB.

Airing date	English title (Chinese title)	Number of episodes	Main cast	Theme song (T) Sub-theme song (ST)	Genre	Notes	Official website
27 Dec 2004- 29 Jan 2005	Shades of Truth 水滸無間道	25	Wong He, Julian Cheung, Gigi Lai, Tavia Yeung, Yuen Wah	T: "沒有半分空間" (Wong He)	Modern action	Copyright notice: 2004.	Official website
31 Jan- 25 Feb	My Family 甜孫爺爺	20	Hawick Lau, Alex Fong, Shirley Yeung, Chung King Fai, Ha Yu	T: "幸福家庭" (Alex Fong); ST: "頭等" (Hawick Lau)	Modern comedy	Copyright notice: 2004.	Official website
28 Feb- 8 Apr	Love Bond 心花放	30	Michael Tao, Kenix Kwok, Moses Chan, Bernice Liu, Anne Heung	T: "心花無限" (Moses Chan); ST: "心裡話" (Michael Tao, Kenix Kwok, Moses Chan, & Bernice Liu)	Modern drama	Copyright notice: 2004.	Official website
11 Apr- 22 May	The Academy 學警雄心	32	Ron Ng, Sammul Chan, Michael Miu, Tavia Yeung, Fiona Sit	T: "勇者" (Ron Ng, Rico Kwok, Zac Kao, & Sky)	Modern drama	Prequel to 2007's On the First Beat. Copyright notice: 2004.	Official website
23 May- 17 Jun	The Gentle Crackdown 秀才遇著兵	20	Moses Chan, Niki Chow, Michelle Yim, Wayne Lai	T: "明知不知傻痴痴" (Moses Chan & Niki Chow)	Costume comedy	Indirect prequel to 2008's The Gentle Crackdown II.	Official website
20 Jun- 16 Jul	Misleading Track 奪命真夫	20	Louisa So, Bowie Lam, Christine Ng, Deric Wan	T: "灰色錯對" (Bowie Lam)	Modern drama	Released overseas on February 28, 2005. Copyright notice: 2004.	Official website
18 Jul- 12 Aug	Wars of In-Laws 我的野蠻奶奶	20	Liza Wang, Myolie Wu, Bosco Wong, Bill Chan, Christine Ng	T: "我的野蠻奶奶" (Liza Wang, Myolie Wu, & Bosco Wong)	Costume comedy	Indirect prequel to 2008's Wars of In-Laws II.	Official website
15 Aug- 23 Sep	Revolving Doors of Vengeance 酒店風雲	30	Joe Ma, Kenix Kwok, Ron Ng, Ella Koon, Elaine Yiu, Derek Kok	T: "心計" (Hacken Lee); ST: "別怪她" (Ron Ng)	Modern drama		Official website
26 Sep- 21 Oct	Into Thin Air 人間蒸發	20	Michael Miu, Melissa Ng, Bernice Liu, Kenneth Ma	T: "實情" (Bernice Liu)	Modern drama		Official website
24 Oct- 6 Dec	Life Made Simple 阿旺新傳	32	Jessica Hsuan, Roger Kwok, Bosco Wong, Leila Tong, Paul Chun, Angela Tong	T: "十萬個為甚麼" (Roger Kwok & Jessica Hsuan); ST: "軟糖" (Roger Kwok & Jessica Hsuan)	Modern drama	Anniversary series Indirect sequel to 2002's Square Pegs.	Official website
7 Dec 2005- 4 Jan 2006	When Rules Turn Loose 識法代言人	21	Liza Wang, Myolie Wu, Sammul Chan, Ha Yu, Wayne Lai, Marco Ngai		Modern drama		Official website

== Third line series ==
These dramas aired in Hong Kong from 10:00 to 11:00 pm, Monday to Friday on TVB.

Airing date	English title (Chinese title)	Number of episodes	Main cast	Theme song (T) Sub-theme song (ST)	Genre	Notes	Official website
5 May 2003- 22 Jan 2005	Virtues of Harmony II 皆大歡喜(時裝版)	443	Nancy Sit, Frankie Lam, Bernice Liu, Michael Tse, Cutie Mui, Kingdom Yuen, Bondy Chiu, Joyce Chen, Louis Yuen, Stephanie Che, Lau Dan, Hawick Lau, Steven Ma, Linda Chung	T: "皆大歡喜" (Nancy Sit); ST: "寸草心" (Nancy Sit)	Modern sitcom	Indirect sequel to 2001's Virtues of Harmony.	Official website
24 Jan- 1 May	Jewel in the Palace 大長今	70	Lee Young-ae, Ji Jin-hee, Park Eun-hye, Hong Ri-na, Im Ho	T: "希望" (Kelly Chen); ST: "思念" (Kelly Chen); ST: "不配相擁" (Kelly Chen & Bowie Lam); ST: "思念" (Bowie Lam)	Costume drama	Korean series	
2 May- 22 Jul	The Legendary Doctor - Hur Jun 醫道	60	Jeon Kwang Ryul	T: "醫道" (Hacken Lee)	Costume drama	Korean series	Official website
25 Jul- 16 Sep	Healing Hands III 妙手仁心III	40	Lawrence Ng, Bowie Lam, Gigi Lai, Moses Chan, Melissa Ng, Bernice Liu, Maggie Siu, Raymond Cho, Michael Tong	ST: "和你的每一天" (Bowie Lam)	Modern drama	Grand production Sequel to 2000's Healing Hands II. Copyright notice: 2004.	Official website
19 Sep- 22 Oct	Ōoku 大奧	22	Miho Kanno, Yuko Asano, Chizuru Ikewaki, Yumi Adachi, Ryuji Harada, Kazuki Kitamura, Vandon Linstein		Costume drama	Japanese series	
24 Oct- 18 Nov	Real Kung Fu 佛山贊師父	20	Maggie Siu, Yuen Biao	T: "武是道" (Alan Tam)	Costume drama	Anniversary series	Official website
21 Nov- 30 Dec	Always Ready 隨時候命	30	Ekin Cheng, Bowie Lam, Charmaine Sheh, Linda Chung, Shirley Yeung, Chris Lai	T: "隨時候命" (Ekin Cheng)	Modern drama		Official website

== Weekend Dramas ==
=== Sunday series ===
These dramas aired in Hong Kong from 9:30 to 10:30 pm, Sunday on TVB.

Airing date	English title (Chinese title)	Number of episodes	Main cast	Theme song (T) Sub-theme song (ST)	Genre	Notes	Official website
31 Jul 2005- 5 Feb 2006	Women on the Run 窈窕熟女	26	Natalis Chan, Joyce Tang, Kingdom Yuen, Christine Ng, Belinda Hamnett, Louis Yuen	ST: "她的主義" (Natalis Chan)	Modern drama		Official website

== Warehoused series ==
These dramas were released overseas and have not broadcast on TVB Jade Channel.

Oversea released date	English title (Chinese title)	Number of episodes	Main cast	Theme song (T) Sub-theme song (ST)	Genre	Notes	Official website
10 Jan- 4 Feb	Strike at Heart 驚艷一槍	20	Joe Ma, Sunny Chan, Charmaine Sheh, Stephen Au, Nadia Chan, Annie Man	T: "真相" (Christopher Wong & Nadia Chan)	Costume action	Aired on TVB Pay Vision Channel in May 2009. Copyright notice: 2004.	
2 May- 27 May	Guts of Man 肝膽崑崙 (or 蓋世孖寶)	20	Ron Ng, Sammul Chan, Louisa So, Joyce Koi, Mandy Cho, Yuen Wah	T: "真心英雄" (Sammul Chan)	Costume action	Aired on TVB Pay Vision Channel in May 2006.	Official website
