= List of TVB series (2008) =

This is a list of series released by TVB in 2008.

== Top ten drama series in ratings ==
The following is a list of TVB's top serial dramas in 2008 by average ratings. The list includes premiere week and final week ratings, as well as the average overall count of live Hong Kong viewers (in millions).

Highest-rating drama series of 2008
Rank	English title	Chinese title	Average	Peak	Premiere week	Final week	HK viewers (millions)
1	Moonlight Resonance	溏心風暴之家好月圓	35	50	33	38	2.20
2	D.I.E.	古靈精探	34	42	32	37	2.13
3	Wars of In-Laws II	野蠻奶奶大戰戈師奶	33	41	33	32	2.07
4	Forensic Heroes II	法證先鋒II	32	37	33	34	2.01
5	Catch Me Now	原來愛上賊	32	38	31	33	2.01
6	The Silver Chamber of Sorrows	銀樓金粉	31	40	29	34	1.95
7	Love Exchange	疑情別戀	30	35	28	32	1.88
8	Survivor's Law II	律政新人王II	30	37	26	31	1.88
9	A Journey Called Life	金石良缘	30	35	28	32	1.88
10	When a Dog Loves a Cat	當狗愛上貓	30	35	29	30	1.88

== Awards ==
Category/Organization	2008 TVB Anniversary Awards 15 November 2008
Best Drama	Moonlight Resonance
Best Actor	Ha Yu; Moonlight Resonance
Best Actress	Michelle Yim; Moonlight Resonance
Best Supporting Actor	Wayne Lai; The Gentle Crackdown II
Best Supporting Actress	Tavia Yeung; Moonlight Resonance
Most Improved Actor	Wong Cho-lam; Best Selling Secrets, Super Trio Supreme, D.I.E., Miss Hong Kong 2008
Most Improved Actress	Nancy Wu; Wars of In-Laws II, D.I.E., Legend of the Demigods, The Silver Chamber of Sorrows, Strictly Come Dancing 2

== First line series ==
These dramas air in Hong Kong from 8:00pm to 8:30pm, Monday to Friday on TVB.

Airing date	English title (Chinese title)	Number of episodes	Main cast	Theme song (T) Sub-theme song (ST)	HD format	Highest average point ratings	Genre	Notes	Official website
12 Mar 2007- 7 Aug 2008	Best Selling Secrets 同事三分親	364	Esther Kwan, Elaine Jin, Elvina Kong, Vin Choi, Bill Chan, Stephen Au, Geoffrey Wong, Yoyo Chen, Wong Cho Lam, Wayne Lai, Florence Kwok, Wong He, Aimee Chan	T: "Piano Sonata No. 11" (Mozart); ST: "只得一次" (Shirley Kwan)	Yes	29	Modern sitcom		Official website
25 Aug- 17 Oct	Legend of the Demigods 搜神傳	22	Sunny Chan, Linda Chung, Benny Chan, Halina Tam, Stephen Au, Nancy Wu, Kara Hui, Charmaine Li	ST: "發誓" (Linda Chung)	No	29	Costume adventure	Released overseas on August 18, 2008. Copyright notice: 2007.	Official website
20 Oct 2008- 12 Feb 2010	Off Pedder 畢打自己人	337	Teresa Mo, Elvina Kong, Ivan Ho, Ng Kwun Lai, Elaine Jin, Joyce Koi, Wayne Lai, Wong Cho Lam, Joyce Cheng, Florence Kwok, Stephen Au, Tsui Wing, Aimee Chan	T: "Serenade No. 13" (Mozart); ST: "無人完美" (Joyce Cheng)	Yes	27	Modern sitcom		Official website

== Second line series ==
These dramas air in Hong Kong from 8:30pm to 9:30pm, Monday to Friday on TVB.

Airing date	English title (Chinese title)	Number of episodes	Main cast	Theme song (T) Sub-theme song (ST)	HD format	Highest average point ratings	Genre	Notes	Official website
1 Jan- 27 Jan	Wars of In-Laws II 野蠻奶奶大戰戈師奶	20	Liza Wang, Myolie Wu, Bosco Wong, Joyce Tang, Derek Kok, Benz Hui	T: "再見" (Liza Wang & FAMA); ST: "感激遇到你" (Myolie Wu & Bosco Wong) "最難過今天" (Myolie Wu & Vincent Wong)	Yes	37	Modern comedy	Indirect sequel to 2005's Wars of In-Laws. Copyright notice: 2007.	Official website
28 Jan- 22 Feb	Wasabi Mon Amour 和味濃情	20	Michael Tao, Louisa So, Paul Chun, Bernice Liu, Joyce Tang	T: "不可不愛" (Eric Suen)	No	32	Modern drama	Copyright notice: 2007.	Official website
25 Feb- 28 Mar	The Master of Tai Chi 太極	25	Vincent Zhao, Raymond Lam, Melissa Ng, Myolie Wu, Kenneth Ma, Selena Li	ST: "浮生若水" (Raymond Lam)	Yes	29	Period action	First HD co-production with China, Vincent Zhao's first series with TVB.	Official website
31 Mar- 25 Apr	A Journey Called Life 金石良缘	20	Steven Ma, Kent Cheng, Linda Chung, Fala Chen, Raymond Cho	T: "小故事" (Linda Chung & Steven Ma)	No	32	Modern drama	Kent Cheng's comeback series. Copyright notice: 2007.	Official website
28 Apr- 23 May	The Silver Chamber of Sorrows 銀樓金粉	21	Nancy Sit, Paul Chun, Ng Wai Kwok, Christine Ng, Shirley Yeung	T: "認命" (Ivana Wong)	No	34	Costume drama		Official website
26 May- 20 Jun	The Money-Maker Recipe 師奶股神	21	Michael Tse, Kiki Sheung, Dominic Lam, Joyce Tang	T: "十優生" (Kay Tse)	No	31	Modern drama		Official website
23 Jun- 21 Jul	Speech of Silence 甜言蜜語	20	Kate Tsui, Kenneth Ma, Chris Lai, Claire Yiu, Elaine Yiu	T: "直覺" (Joyce Cheng)	No	30	Modern drama		Official website
21 Jul- 15 Aug	When a Dog Loves a Cat 當狗愛上貓	20	Gallen Lo, Myolie Wu, Margie Tsang, David Lui, Raymond Wong, Bernice Liu	T: "當狗愛上貓" (Gallen Lo & Myolie Wu)	Yes	32	Modern drama	Gallen Lo's comeback series.	Official website
25 Aug- 19 Sep	Your Class or Mine 尖子攻略	20	Bobby Au Yeung, Sheren Tang, Benz Hui, Derek Kok, Him Law	T: "好學為福" (Bobby Au Yeung, HotCha, Renee Dai, & Percy Fan)	Yes	31	Modern drama		Official website
22 Sep- 24 Oct	The Four 少年四大名捕	24	Raymond Lam, Ron Ng, Kenneth Ma, Sammul Chan, Kate Tsui, Selena Li	T: "風暴" (Raymond Lam, Ron Ng, Kenneth Ma, & Sammul Chan)	No	30	Costume action		Official website
27 Oct- 5 Dec	When Easterly Showers Fall on the Sunny West 東山飄雨西關晴	30	Liza Wang, Charmaine Sheh, Joe Ma, Raymond Wong, Selena Li, Sharon Luk, Edwin Siu, Kiki Sheung	T: "愛在天邊" (Liza Wang); ST: "陪你哭也只得我" (Joe Ma & Charmaine Sheh)	No	29	Period drama	41st Anniversary Series Edwin Siu's comeback series	Official website
8 Dec 2008- 2 Jan 2009	Pages of Treasures; Click入黃金屋	20	Wayne Lai, Sonija Kwok, Shirley Yeung, Eric Suen, Vivien Yeo, Paul Chun	T: "我的最愛" (Eric Suen)	No	28	Modern drama		Official website

== Third line series ==
These dramas air in Hong Kong from 9:30pm to 10:30pm, Monday to Friday on TVB.

Airing date	English title (Chinese title)	Number of episodes	Main cast	Theme song (T) Sub-theme song (ST)	HD format	Highest average point ratings	Genre	Notes	Official website
24 Dec 2007- 18 Jan 2008	Survivor's Law II 律政新人王II	20	Kenneth Ma, Sammul Chan, Ella Koon, Selena Li	T: "選擇我" (Kenneth Ma)	No	31	Modern drama	Sequel to 2003's Survivor's Law.	Official website
21 Jan- 15 Feb	The Gentle Crackdown II 秀才愛上兵	20	Steven Ma, Yumiko Cheng, Wayne Lai, Ha Yu	T: "豺狼與羊" (Steven Ma & Yumiko Cheng)	No	32	Costume comedy	Indirect sequel to 2005's The Gentle Crackdown. Copyright notice: 2007.	Official website
18 Feb- 15 Mar	The Seventh Day 最美麗的第七天	20	Kevin Cheng, Niki Chow, Bosco Wong, Natalie Tong	T: "最美麗的第七天" (Kevin Cheng); ST: "抱著空氣" (Kevin Cheng & Niki Chow)	No	34	Modern romance	Original cast from 2005's Under the Canopy of Love. Copyright notice: 2007.	Official website
17 Mar- 18 Apr	D.I.E. 古靈精探	25	Roger Kwok, Sonija Kwok, Kenneth Ma, Margie Tsang, Derek Kok	T: "花樣奇案" (Roger Kwok)	No	37	Modern action	Prequel to 2009's D.I.E. II. Released overseas on March 10, 2008. Copyright notice: 2007.	Official website
21 Apr- 16 May	Catch Me Now 原來愛上賊	20	Damian Lau, Idy Chan, Joe Ma, Fala Chen		Yes	33	Modern action	Idy Chan's comeback series.	Official website
19 May- 27 Jun	Forensic Heroes II 法證先鋒II	30	Bobby Au-Yeung, Charmaine Sheh, Kevin Cheng, Frankie Lam, Yoyo Mung	T: "遺留" (Edmond Leung); ST: "等你" (Charmaine Sheh); ST: "You Are My Angel" (Loretta Chow)	No	34	Modern suspense	Sequel to 2006's Forensic Heroes.	Official website
30 Jun- 25 Jul	Love Exchange 疑情別戀	20	Michael Miu, Anita Yuen, Crystal Tin, Power Chan	T: "距離" (Kary Ng)	Yes	32	Modern thriller	Anita Yuen's comeback series.	Official website
28 Jul- 21 Sep	Moonlight Resonance 溏心風暴之家好月圓	40	Louise Lee, Ha Yu, Susanna Kwan, Michelle Yim, Raymond Lam, Moses Chan, Tavia Yeung, Linda Chung, Kate Tsui, Fala Chen, Chris Lai, Bosco Wong	T: "無心害你" (Susanna Kwan); ST: "愛不疚" (Raymond Lam)	Yes	47	Modern drama	Grand production Indirect sequel to 2007's Heart of Greed.	Official website
22 Sep- 18 Oct	Last One Standing 與敵同行	21	Roger Kwok, Kevin Cheng, Yoyo Mung, Kiki Sheung, Elaine Yiu, Macy Chan		Yes	31	Modern suspense		Official website
20 Oct 2008- 13 Feb 2009	The Gem of Life 珠光寶氣	82	Gigi Lai, Ada Choi, Maggie Siu, Moses Chan, Bowie Lam, Louise Lee, Bosco Wong, Linda Chung, Wong He	T: "鑽禧" (Shirley Kwan); ST: "無情有愛" (Linda Chung); ST: "相戀兩個字" (Bowie Lam & Gigi Lai); ST: "我還在等甚麼" (Moses Chan)	Yes	32	Modern drama	Grand Production; 41st Anniversary Series; Gigi Lai's final drama before retirement	Official website

== Weekend Dramas ==
=== Saturday series ===
These dramas aired in Hong Kong from 10:30pm to 11:00pm, Saturday on TVB.

Airing date	English title (Chinese title)	Number of episodes	Main cast	Theme song (T) Sub-theme song (ST)	HD format	Highest average point ratings	Genre	Notes	Official website
16 Jun- 3 Aug	Dressage to Win 盛裝舞步愛作戰	9	Michelle Wai, Ken Hung, Wylie Chiu, Ryan Lam, Him Law, Katy Kung, Kimmy Kwan, Carlos Chan, Andy Hui, Tracy Ip, Bill Chan, Mandy Lieu	T: "一步一傾心" (Phoenix Yeung & Iris Wu); ST: "這該死的愛" (Patrick Tang)	Yes	N/A	Modern drama	TVB mini-series	Official website
