= The Academy (Hong Kong TV series) =

- The Academy poster
- 學警雄心
- Genre: Modern Drama
- Starring: Ron Ng; Sammul Chan; Tavia Yeung; Fiona Sit; Michael Miu; Chin Kar-lok; Michelle Yim
- Opening theme: "勇者" by Rico Kwok, Zac Kao, Ron Ng, & Sky
- Country of origin: Hong Kong
- Original language: Cantonese
- No. of episodes: 32

Production
- Running time: 45 minutes (approx.)

Original release
- Network: TVB
- Release: June 2005 – November 2005

Related
- On the First Beat (2007); E.U. (2009)

The Academy (Traditional Chinese: 學警雄心) is a TVB modern drama series broadcast in June 2005.

The series follows the lives of a group of new Hong Kong Police recruits as they proceed through training at the Hong Kong Police training school (PTS). Within these 27 weeks, each of them learned their lessons, each of them became more mature, each of them became a better person as the relationship between the students and the teachers grows stronger and stronger.

A direct sequel, On the First Beat (學警出更) was produced and broadcast in 2007 continued with Ron Ng and Sammul Chan, alongside Joey Yung, Sonija Kwok and Michael Tao. Another sequel, E.U. (學警狙擊) was produced and released in 2009 continued with Ron Ng and Sammul Chan, alongside Michael Miu, Kathy Chow, Elanne Kong, and Michael Tse. Michael Miu reprises a new role as a triad boss in E.U., which is unrelated to his role in The Academy.

== Cast ==
=== Main cast ===
Cast	Role	Description
Ron Ng	Chung Lap-Man 鍾立文	PC66336 Police Cadet; Ho Fa's boyfriend.
Sammul Chan	Lee Pak-Kiu 李柏翹	PC66341 Police Cadet; First known as Wai Pak-Kiu. Ma Oi-Lam's boyfriend Finds out that Lee Man-Sing is his father at the end.
Tavia Yeung	Ho Fa 何花	Police Training School (PTS) Canteen Clerk; Chung Lap-Man's girlfriend.
Fiona Sit	Ma Oi-Lam (Fiona) 馬靄琳	WPC66343 Police Cadet; Lee Pak-Kiu's girlfriend.
Michael Miu	Lee Man-Sing (Sunny/Dau Ba Sing) 李文昇	SGT39007 Police Sergeant; Part of Police Training School (PTS) Trainer; Lee Pak-Kiu's father. Kuk Ming-Cheung's friend. Chan Yin-Ting's close friend and former classmate/long time crush. (Deceased - Episode 32)
Michelle Yim	Chan Yin-Ting 陳燕婷	Chung Lap-Man and Chung Ka-Lai's mother. Chung Chi-Wah's ex-wife. Chan Yin-Han's younger sister. Lee Man-Sing's close friend and former classmate.
Chin Ka Lok	Kuk Ming-Cheung (Ken) 曲明昌	SGT38269 Police Sergeant; Part of Police Training School (PTS) Trainer; Lee Man-Sing's friend. Ko Wai-Kwan's lover.
Priscilla Ku (顧紀筠)	Ko Wai-Kwan (Ann) 高慧君	WSGT Police Station Sergeant; Part of Police Training School (PTS) Trainer; Kuk Ming-Cheung's lover.

=== Other cast ===
Cast	Role	Description
Waise Lee	Chung Chi-Wah 鍾志華	Chung Lap-Man and Chung Ka-Lai's father. Chan Yin-Ting's ex-husband.
Rachel Poon (潘曉彤)	Chung Ka-Lai (Miki) 鍾家麗	Chung Lap-Man's younger sister.
Law Koon Lan (羅冠蘭)	Chan Yin-Han (Queenie) 陳燕蘭	Chan Yin-Ting's older sister.
Rico Kwok (郭力行)	Chan Kwok-Keung (Bobby) 陳國強	PC66332 Police Cadet; Chung Lap-Man's best friend
Li Ka Sing (李家聲)	Lam Suk-Chuen 林叔泉	PC66340 Police Cadet
Casper Chan (陳凱怡)	To Ling-Ling (Ling) 姚玲玲	PC66550 Police Cadet
Zac Kao (高皓正)	On Chi-Ho 安子豪	PC66366 Police Cadet
Deep Ng	Ho Ming 何明	Convict; Ho Fa's older brother.
Wu Fung	Chiu Tim-Fook 趙添福	Lee Pak-Kiu's grandfather.
Eddie Li	Ryan	Comes from an upper-class background and likes Fiona. Fiona doesn't like him.
