= List of TVB series (2007) =

This is a list of series released by TVB in 2007.

== Top ten drama series in ratings ==
The following is a list of TVB's top serial dramas in 2007 by average ratings. The list includes premiere week and final week ratings, as well as the average overall count of live Hong Kong viewers (in millions).

Highest-rating drama series of 2007
Rank	English title	Chinese title	Average	Peak	Premiere week	Final week	HK viewers (millions)
1	The Family Link	師奶兵團	33	42	31	33	2.13
2	Fathers and Sons	爸爸閉翳	32	40	31	37	2.07
3	Heart of Greed	溏心風暴	32	48	29	40	2.07
4	Ten Brothers	十兄弟	32	39	29	36	2.07
5	On the First Beat	學警出更	31	38	30	35	2.00
6	The Green Grass of Home	緣來自有機	31	36	29	33	2.00
7	Dicey Business	賭場風雲	31	37	30	34	2.00
8	Steps	舞動全城	31	36	31	32	2.00
9	The Drive of Life	歲月風雲	30	39	31	33	1.94
10	War and Destiny	亂世佳人	30	35	30	32	1.94

== First line series ==
These dramas aired in Hong Kong from 8:00 to 8:30 pm, Monday to Friday on TVB.

Airing date	English title (Chinese title)	Number of episodes	Main cast	Theme song (T) Sub-theme song (ST)	Genre	Notes	Official website
10 Apr 2006- 10 Mar 2007	Welcome to the House 高朋滿座	239	Lawrence Cheng, Christine Ng, Chung King Fai, Raymond Cho, Angelina Lo, Kingdom Yuen, Johnson Lee, Shermon Tang	T: "細路仔" (Lawrence Cheng, Christine Ng, Chung King Fai, Raymond Cho, Angelina Lo, Kingdom Yuen, Johnson Lee, & Shermon Tang)	Modern sitcom	Copyright notice: 2006 (Eps. 1-195), 2007 (Eps. 196-239).	Official website
12 Mar 2007- 7 Aug 2008	Best Selling Secrets 同事三分親	364	Esther Kwan, Elaine Jin, Elvina Kong, Vin Choi, Bill Chan, Stephen Au, Geoffrey Wong, Yoyo Chen, Wong Cho Lam, Wayne Lai, Florence Kwok, Wong He, Aimee Chan	T: "Piano Sonata No. 11" (Mozart); ST: "只得一次" (Shirley Kwan)	Modern sitcom		Official website

== Second line series ==
These dramas aired in Hong Kong from 8:30 to 9:30 pm, Monday to Friday on TVB.

Airing date	English Title (Chinese title)	Number of episodes	Main cast	Theme song (T) Sub-theme song (ST)	Genre	Notes	Official website
18 Dec 2006- 10 Feb 2007	The Conquest 爭霸	42	Damian Lau, Joe Ma, Sonija Kwok, Aloys Chan, Power Chan	T: "爭霸" (Aloys Chan); ST: "真永遠" (Aloys Chan)	Costume action	Released overseas on June 12, 2006.	Official website
12 Feb- 9 Mar	Ten Brothers 十兄弟	20	Frankie Lam, Kenix Kwok, Leila Tong, Chris Lai, Don Li, Jack Wu, Nancy Wu	T: "十指緊扣" (Frankie Lam & Kenix Kwok)	Costume comedy	Released overseas on September 19, 2005. Copyright notice: 2004.	Official website
12 Mar- 14 Apr	War and Destiny 亂世佳人	30	Sunny Chan, Ron Ng, Myolie Wu, Leila Tong, Mandy Cho, Bill Chan	T: "幸而" (Myolie Wu)	Period drama	Released overseas on July 10, 2006. Copyright notice: 2006.	Official website
16 Apr- 11 May	A Change of Destiny 天機算	20	Steven Ma, Benny Chan, Shirley Yeung, Selena Li	T: "天數" (Steven Ma & Joel Chan)	Costume drama		Official website
14 May- 10 Jun	The Family Link 師奶兵團	21	Sheren Tang, Michael Tse, Cecilia Yip, Kiki Sheung, Leila Tong, Kenneth Ma	T: "半邊天" (Miriam Yeung)	Modern drama	Copyright notice: 2006.	Official website
11 Jun- 6 Jul	The Green Grass of Home 緣來自有機	20	Sunny Chan, Christine Ng, Chris Lai, Natalie Tong	T: "平凡" (Leo Ku)	Modern drama		Official website
9 Jul- 3 Aug	Devil's Disciples 強劍	20	Kevin Cheng, Bosco Wong, Bernice Liu, Shirley Yeung, Sharon Chan	T: "強劍" (Kevin Cheng & Bosco Wong)	Costume action	Released overseas on February 12, 2007. Copyright notice: 2006.	Official website
6 Aug- 7 Sep	Fathers and Sons 爸爸閉翳	25	Bobby Au Yeung, Wong He, Yoyo Mung, Tavia Yeung, Ha Yu	T: "親近" (Eason Chan)	Modern drama		Official website
10 Sep- 5 Oct	Steps 舞動全城	20	Steven Ma, Bernice Liu, Wayne Lai, Kate Tsui, Claire Yiu, Matthew Ko	T: "I'm So In Love With You" (Bernice Liu)	Modern drama		Official website
8 Oct- 2 Nov	Men Don't Cry 奸人堅	21	Dayo Wong, Cecilia Yip, Vivien Yeo, Dominic Lam, Benz Hui	T: "奸人堅" (Dayo Wong)	Period comedy	Anniversary series	Official website
5 Nov- 1 Dec	Word Twisters' Adventures 鐵咀銀牙	20	Charmaine Sheh, Jordan Chan, Michael Tse, Sharon Chan	T: "扭計王" (Jordan Chan)	Costume comedy		Official website
3 Dec- 28 Dec	The Building Blocks of Life 建築有情天	20	Alex Fong, Christine Ng, Tavia Yeung	T: "深情" (David Lui)	Modern drama		Official website

== Third line series ==
These dramas aired in Hong Kong from 9:30 to 10:30 pm, Monday to Friday on TVB.

Airing date	English title (Chinese title)	Number of episodes	Main cast	Theme song (T) Sub-theme song (ST)	Genre	Notes	Official website
20 Nov 2006- 5 Jan 2007	Dicey Business 賭場風雲	35	Bobby Au Yeung, Jessica Hsuan, Michael Miu, Bosco Wong, Tavia Yeung, Benz Hui	T: "先賭為快" (Hacken Lee); ST: "第幾天" (Bosco Wong)	Modern drama	Grand production	Official website
8 Jan- 9 Feb	The Brink of Law 突圍行動	25	Steven Ma, Ron Ng, Michelle Yim, Bernice Liu, Shirley Yeung, Kate Tsui	T: "突圍" (Steven Ma & Ron Ng); ST: "分手" (Bernice Liu)	Modern action	Copyright notice: 2006.	Official website
12 Feb- 9 Mar	Best Bet 迎妻接福	20	Linda Chung, Michael Tse, Wayne Lai, Anne Heung	T: "心心相印" (Linda Chung)	Costume comedy		Official website
12 Mar- 8 Apr	Life Art 寫意人生	20	Gigi Lai, Kevin Cheng, Paul Chun	T: "活得寫意" (Kevin Cheng)	Modern drama	Copyright notice: 2006.	Official website
9 Apr- 1 Jun	Heart of Greed 溏心風暴	40	Louise Lee, Ha Yu, Susanna Kwan, Moses Chan, Bosco Wong, Michelle Yim, Linda Chung, Tavia Yeung, Raymond Lam	T: "講不出聲" (Susanna Kwan); ST: "心領" (Raymond Lam & Linda Chung)	Modern drama	Grand production Related to 2008's Moonlight Resonance. Copyright notice: 2006.	Official website
4 Jun- 13 Jul	On The First Beat 學警出更	30	Ron Ng, Sammul Chan, Michael Tao, Sonija Kwok, Joey Yung, Kate Tsui	T: "邁向夢想的天空" (Ron Ng, Deep Ng, & Kenny Kwan); ST: "密友" (Joey Yung)	Modern action	Sequel to 2005's The Academy	Official website
16 Jul- 5 Oct	The Drive of Life 歲月風雲	60	Damian Lau, Michael Miu, Raymond Lam, Charmaine Sheh, Jessica Hsuan, Myolie Wu, Sheren Tang, Joe Ma, Ron Ng, Toby Leung, Ng Wai Kwok	T: "歲月風雲" (Hacken Lee & Steve Chou); ST: "愛在記憶中找你" (Raymond Lam)	Modern drama	Grand production Co-production with China's CCTV.	Official website
8 Oct- 24 Nov	The Ultimate Crime Fighter 通天幹探	37	Moses Chan, Gigi Lai, Yoyo Mung, Yuen Biao, Kevin Cheng	ST: "賜我一死" (Moses Chan)	Modern action	Anniversary series Copyright notice: 2006.	Official website
26 Nov- 21 Dec	Marriage of Inconvenience 兩妻時代	20	Bobby Au Yeung, Angela Tong, Toby Leung, Raymond Wong, Patrick Tang	T: "沒了沒完" (Angela Tong, Toby Leung & Patrick Tang)	Modern drama		Official website
24 Dec 2007- 18 Jan 2008	Survivor's Law II 律政新人王II	20	Kenneth Ma, Sammul Chan, Ella Koon, Selena Li	T: "選擇我" (Kenneth Ma)	Modern drama	Sequel to 2003's Survivor's Law.	Official website

== Weekend Dramas ==
=== Saturday series ===
These dramas aired in Hong Kong from 10:30 to 11:30 pm, Saturday on TVB.

Airing date	English title (Chinese title)	Number of episodes	Main cast	Theme song (T) Sub-theme song (ST)	Genre	Notes	Official website
1 Sep- 29 Sep	ICAC Investigators 2007 廉政行動2007	5	Michael Miu, Sunny Chan, Ron Ng, Shirley Yeung, Michelle Yim, Priscilla Ku, Edmond Leung		Modern suspense	TVB production partnering with ICAC.	Official website

=== Sunday series ===
These dramas aired in Hong Kong from 10:00 to 11:30 pm, Sunday on TVB.

Airing date	English title (Chinese title)	Number of episodes	Main cast	Theme song (T) Sub-theme song (ST)	Genre	Notes	Official website
19 Aug- 21 Oct	Homage to Chagall: The Colours of Love 森之愛情	10	Sammy Leung, Kitty Yuen, Charlene Choi, Miriam Yeung, Stephy Tang, Alex Fong, Hins Cheung, Ivana Wong, Denise Ho, Eric Suen, Shirley Yeung, Niki Chow	T: "八月的蝴蝶" (Sammy Leung)	Modern romance	TVB mini-series	Official website

== Warehoused series ==
These dramas were released overseas and have not broadcast on TVB Jade Channel.

Oversea released date	English title (Chinese title)	Number of episodes	Main cast	Theme song (T) Sub-theme song (ST)	Genre	Notes	Official website
15 Jan- 9 Feb	Heavenly In-Laws 我外母唔係人	20	Nancy Sit, Joey Leung, Linda Chung, Yuen Wah	T: "外母大人" (Nancy Sit & Joey Leung)	Period drama	Aired on TVB Pay Vision Channel in July 2007. Copyright notice: 2006.	Official website
12 Mar- 6 Apr	The Slicing of the Demon 凶城計中計	20	Sunny Chan, Bernice Liu, Michael Tse, Angela Tong	T: "還用在意嗎" (Bernice Liu)	Costume drama	Copyright notice: 2006.	
9 Jul- 3 Aug	Phoenix Rising 蘭花劫	20	Louisa So, Crystal Tin, Sunny Chan, Leila Tong	T: "用愛邁步" (Kelly Chen)	Period drama	Aired on TVB Pay Vision Channel in March 2008 and TVB Jade on May 29, 2017.	Official website
