= On the First Beat =

- Official poster
- Also known as: The Academy 2
- 學警出更
- Genre: Modern Action
- Starring: Ron Ng; Sammul Chan; Michael Tao; Sonija Kwok; Joey Yung; Kate Tsui; Kenny Kwan; Chin Kar-lok
- Opening theme: "邁向夢想的天空" by Ron Ng, Deep Ng, & Kenny Kwan
- Ending theme: "密友"; Joey Yung
- Country of origin: Hong Kong
- Original language: Cantonese
- No. of episodes: 30

Production
- Running time: 45 minutes (approx.)

Original release
- Network: TVB
- Release: June 4 – July 13, 2007

Related
- The Academy (2005); E.U. (2009)

On the First Beat (Traditional Chinese: 學警出更) is a TVB modern action series broadcast in June 2007.

The series is a direct sequel to 2005's The Academy (學警雄心). The main cast features Ron Ng, Sammul Chan and Chin Ka Lok from the original series and new cast including Michael Tao, Sonija Kwok, Joey Yung, Kenny Kwan and Kate Tsui. The story continues on with the two male leads in the series with their growth as young police officers with personal conflicts in their bonds as friends and romantic relationships. The drama is about the life of a group of Hong Kong police officers and cadets inside and outside of work.

A direct sequel, E.U. (學警狙擊) was produced and aired in 2009 continued with Ron Ng and Sammul Chan, alongside Michael Miu, Kathy Chow, Elanne Kwong, and Michael Tse.

== Plot summary ==
After going through the excruciating training of the academy, Chung Lap Man (Ron Ng) and Lee Pak Kiu (Sammul Chan) finally become official police officers and are assigned into the same branch. One operation causes Kiu's girlfriend to die a violent death, and Kiu and Man separate from one another. Newly appointed police Sergeant Cheung Ging Fung (Michael Tao Dai Yue) turns out to be the crime leader of that operation. Kiu further discovers that there's an inside story to his girlfriend's death...

The feelings between Man and his colleague Cheung Nim Yan (Joey Yung Jo Yi) gradually develop. However, his cousin Man Jing (Kate Tsui), like before, pursues him. On the other hand, Kiu loves Fung's ex-wife, Yuen Wai Nei (Sonija Kwok Sin Nei). However, the old feelings between Fung and Nei still hasn't ended. Facing the impacts of career, friendship, and love, how will the two new officers deal with it all?"

== Synopsis ==
Chung Lap-Man (Ron Ng) and Lee Pak-Kiu (Sammul Chan) patrolling the streets of Hong Kong with fellow senior constables. During one patrolling shift, Pak Kiu messes with the wrong group of gangs, Cheng Chi-Keung (Wai Ka Hung) and Cheung King-Fung (Michael Tao).

After realizing that Pak-Kiu was manipulated by Chi-Keung, Fiona Ma Oi-Lam (Fiona Sit) tries to clear Pak-Kiu's name from the complaint by Chi Keung. Fiona and Lap-Man finds Chi-Keung and King-Fung dealing drugs in a parking lot and tries to photograph their drugs-transaction. Fiona accidentally sets off a car alarm and is discovered by Chi-Keung and King-Fung, holding her hostage. Pak-Kiu tries to rescue Fiona, instead he gets shot in the side of his head by Chi-Keung and subsequently Chi-Keung shoots Fiona in the stomach, consequently she dies. Pak Kiu then wakes up in the hospital and finds out that Fiona is dead and blames it all on Lap-Man. Throughout the whole series, conflict and extreme hatred for each other is constantly shown between them.

Half a year later, Lap-Man and Pak-Kiu are introduced to their new sergeant, King-Fung. Turns out King Fung was an undercover police officer responsible for the arrest of Chi-Keung earlier. Lap-Man and Pak-Kiu both develop a sense of hatred towards King-Fung. Lap Man gets angry and files a fake complaint letter on King Fung. King Fung's sister, Cheung Nim-Yan (Joey Yung), who is an investigation constable, discover the fake letter prank.

Lap-Man and Pak-Kiu then meets Kuk Ming-Cheung (Chin Ka Lok), who tells him about Pak-Kiu's father, Lee Man-Shing, (Michael Miu). Apparently Pak Kiu's father and King Fung had a bitter past. During this time, Pak Kiu tries to take some psychology classes to try to build up a better resume when he applies for an inspector position within the police department. Yuen Wai-Nei (Sonija Kwok) joins Pak Kiu's classes as she thinks its beneficial to police officers.

Man Ching (Kate Tsui) comes to Hong Kong from the United States in hopes of finding her mother, who turned out to be Lap Man's aunt. Man Ching then develop feelings for Lap-Man, even though she is aware of his girlfriend. Trying to get Man Ching off of his back, Lap Man challenges her to be a police officer at the Police Training School (PTS). Man Ching accepts the challenge. Yuen Ka-Fu (Kenny Kwan), Yuen Wai-Nei's brother, coincidentally just came to Hong Kong from Canada. He was expelled from a Canadian university, and applies to be a police officer. He meets Man Ching in the training.

King-Fung, Ming-Cheung, and a few other sergeants receive a letter that tells them they will be training for the Police Tactical Unit (PTU). During the time at the training camp, Ming-Cheung tries to screw King-Fung over. During the training Pak-Kiu and Lap-Man always get into arguments, their behaviour then noticed by King-Fung, Ming-Cheung. One day Lap-Man tells Ming-Cheung that King-Fung no longer holds a grudge against Man-Shing and that everything is back to normal, Ming-Cheung then becomes all friendly to King-Fung.

At this time, Wai-Nei is still angry over the fact that her ex-husband, King-Fung had "slept" with another woman and that she doesn't forgive him. One day King Fung goes to make this glass vase as it has sentimental value to both him and Wai Nei, he gives it to her and they are back together.

Lap-Man and Nim-Yan slowly starts to get closer and develop feelings for each other. But knowing that Lap Man has a girlfriend, Ho Fa (Tavia Yeung) and Man Ching has a crush on him, Nim Yan backs off. Wai Nei and King Fung's relationship grows and plans to get married. At this time, King Fung encounters Yip Ling-Fung (Selena Li). Ling-Fung runs into some financial problems and King-Fung helps her. On the day of Wai-Nei and King-Fung's wedding, Ling-Fung tries to draw King-Fung's attention by attempting to commit suicide. King-Fung tries to get Ling-Fung to cooperate, but she ignores him, eventually King-Fung has to go with her to the hospital and becomes extremely late for his wedding. As soon as he gets to his wedding, Wai-Nei calls off the wedding and vows that she will no longer be friends or anything with King-Fung. At this time Wai-Nei finds out that she is pregnant with King-Fung's baby.

Wai-Nei soon discovers that Pak-Kiu has developed feelings for her and is willing to be the baby's father. But yet, Pak-Kiu constantly gets nightmares of Fiona getting killed by Chi-Keung. He seeks help from a psychologist, who tells him that he actually still loves and misses Fiona. Pak-Kiu is also clear that Wai-Nei still has feelings for King-Fung.

King-Fung, who is unaware Wai-Nei is carrying his baby, heard from his grandmother than Wai-Nei wants to piece back the broken glass vase. He decides to make a new one for her. Wai-Nei receives the glass vase and decides to reconcile with King-Fung. She heads to find King-Fung in Ling-Fung's home, but ends up being held hostage by Chi-Keung.

Wai-Nei ends up hospitalised and severely injured, and Chi-Keung heads to the hospital to deal with King-Fung. Chi-Keung escapes injured, but was caught and shot by Ka-Fu who revenged his sister. Later on, Wai-Nei's condition suffers complications and she is forced to deliver her baby only after a 5-month gestation period.

After delivering her baby, Wai-Nei wakes up and sees King-Fung asleep by her bed. Yet she died later on, leaving King-Fung and her family members heartbroken. For the sake of Wai-Nei, King-Fung decides to lead life happily and take good care of their son, Kai-On.

Lap-Man also ends up with Nim-Yan in the end.

== Cast ==
=== Main cast ===
Cast	Role	Description
Ron Ng	Chung Lap-Man 鍾立文	PC66336 Police Constable; Part of Yau Ma Tei Police Station. Part of Kowloon Police Tactical Unit (PTU). Ho fa's ex-boyfriend. Likes Cheung Nim-Yan
Sammul Chan	Lee Pak-Kiu 李柏翹	PC66341 Police Constable; Part of Yau Ma Tei Police Station. Part of Kowloon Police Tactical Unit (PTU). Ma Oi-Lam's ex-boyfriend because Ma Oi-Lam died.
Michael Tao	Cheung King-Fung 張景峰	SGT39270 Police Sergeant; Part of Yau Ma Tei Police Station. Part of Kowloon Police Tactical Unit (PTU) as Platoon A Command. Yuen Wai-Nei's ex-husband. Cheung Nim-Yan's older brother.
Sonija Kwok	Yuen Wai-Nei (Winnie) 袁慧妮	WIP38121 Inspector of Police; Yau Ma Tei Police Station Head of Internal Investigation Branch. Cheung King-Fung's ex-wife. Dies in the last episode
Joey Yung	Cheung Nim-Yan 張念恩	WPC66531 Police Constable; Yau Ma Tei Police Station Internal Investigation Branch. Cheung King-Fung's younger sister.
Florence Kwok	Tong Ching-Nga 湯靜雅	WSGT39213 Police Sergeant; Part of Yau Ma Tei Police Station. Part of Kowloon Police Tactical Unit (PTU) as Platoon B Second in command.
Chin Ka Lok	Kuk Ming-Cheung (Ken) 曲明昌	SGT38269 Police Sergeant; Part of Shum Shui Bo Police Station. Part of Kowloon Police Tactical Unit (PTU) as Platoon A Second in command.
Kate Tsui	Man Ching 文靜	WPC66865 Police Constable; Part of Yau Ma Tei Police Station. Chung Lap-Man's cousin.
Kenny Kwan	Yuen Ka-Fu 袁家富	PC66823 Police Constable; Part of Shum Shui Bo Police Station. Yuen Wai-Nei's younger brother.

=== Guest starring ===
Cast	Role	Description
Tavia Yeung	Ho Fa 何花	Interior Design Student; Chung Lap-Man's ex-girlfriend.
Fiona Sit	Ma Oi-Lam (Fiona) 馬靄琳	WPC66343 Police Constable (Deceased); Part of Tsim Sa Tsui Police Station. Lee Pak-Kiu's deceased girlfriend.
Michael Miu	Lee Man-Sing (Sunny) 李文昇	Deceased Police Sergeant; Lee Pak-Kiu's father.
Michelle Yim	Chan Yin-Ting 陳燕婷	Chung Lap-Man and Chung Ka-Lai's mother. Chan Yin-Han's younger sister.
Rachel Poon (潘曉彤)	Chung Ka-Lai 鍾家麗	Chung Lap-Man's younger sister.
Kenny Wong (黃德斌)	Hon Chin-Kuen 韓展權	Lee Man-Sing and Chung King-Fung's friend.
Matthew Ko	Lo Yan-Jaak 路仁澤	Cheung Nim-Yan's high school classmate.
Selena Li	Yip Ling-Fung 葉玲鳳	Beer Girl
Deep Ng	Ho Ming 何明	Ex-Convict; Ho Fa's older brother.
Astrid Chan (陳芷菁)	Karen	Psychiatrist

=== Other cast ===
Cast	Role	Description
Li Ka Sing (李家聲)	Lam Suk-Chuen 林叔泉	PC66340 Police Officer; Part of Yau Ma Tei Police Station. Part of Kowloon Police Tactical Unit (PTU).
Casper Chan (陳凱怡)	To Ling-Ling (Ling) 姚玲玲	WPC66550 Police Officer; Part of Yau Ma Tei Police Station. Part of Kowloon Police Tactical Unit (PTU). Wife of Bong siu ye
Ben Wong	Po Lik Chi 布力治	Superintendent; Head of Kowloon Police Tactical Unit (PTU).
Yan Ng	Kam Siu-Bo 甘小寶	PC66415 Police Officer; Part of Yau Ma Tei Police Station. Part of Kowloon Police Tactical Unit (PTU).
Patrick Dunn	Tam Jo-Ming 譚祖銘	Senior Inspector Police; Part of Tsim Sa Tsui Police Station. Second in command of Kowloon Police Tactical Unit (PTU).
Power Chan	Lai Chi-Kin 黎志堅	SGT39232 Police Sergeant; Part of Tsim Sa Tsui Police Station. Part of Kowloon Police Tactical Unit (PTU) as Platoon B Command.
Zac Kao (高皓正)	On Chi-Ho 安子豪	PC66366 Police Officer; Part of Tsim Sa Tsui Police Station. Part of Kowloon Police Tactical Unit (PTU).
Ellesmere Choi	Kwok Kai-Chiu 郭啟超	Senior Inspector of Police; Part of Yau Ma Tei Police Station.
Dominic Lam	Wu Cheuk-Yan 胡卓仁	SP39384 Superintendent of Police; Head of CID, Kowloon Police Region
Law Koon Lan (羅冠蘭)	Chan Yin-Han (Queenie) 陳燕蘭	Chan Yin-Ting's older sister. Man Ching's mother. Chung Lap-Man's aunt.
Gordon Liu	Yuen Moon 袁滿	Moon Gei (滿記)Cafe Owner; Wong Suk-Yin's husband. Yuen Wai-Nei and Yuen Ka-Fu's father.
Kara Hui	Wong Suk-Yin 黃淑賢	Yuen Moon's wife. Yuen Wai-Nei and Yuen Ka-Fu's mother.
Wong Cho Lam	Ah Shui 阿水	Moon Gei (滿記) Cafe Clerk
Wai Ka Hung (韋家雄)	Cheng Chi-Keung 鄭子強	Ma Oi-Lam's murderer.

== Critical response ==
Fans of the show didn't like how Fiona Sit was so easily removed from the show very early in the series just as Joey Yung entered the story line. There was speculation that she couldn't commit a schedule to finish the series and so like many stars who previously worked on a continued TVB series and couldn't fully commit, they were simply "killed" or excused off to move along the plot. Several of the previous characters had unresolved plot lines, but the actors had different committed projects and so they were never re-visited or had brief returns. It further pushes the television trope of women being disposable in TVB dramas considering that actresses are often replaced with new actresses in a franchise, which is especially apparent in this sequel.

Various relationships were discontinued while other characters were re-cycled or actors repackaged as "new characters". TVB is most notorious for defying canon logic by continuing a series and reintroducing characters that had completely different roles compared to the last series.

One of the biggest criticisms came about Sonija Kwok's character Winnie's violent death. While badly injured, she had surgery and wasn't placed in the Intensive Care Unit or rigged to any medical electronics to monitor her poor progress. She merely woke up and died in the morning without any nurses or medical alarms. Fans joked she was placed in the worst hospital for medical care.

== Viewership ratings ==
	Week	Episode	Average Points	Peaking Points	References
1	June 4, 2007 - June 8, 2007	1 — 5	30	33	
2	June 11, 2007 - June 15, 2007	6 — 10	28	—	
3	June 18, 2007 - June 22, 2007	11 — 15	30	32	
4	June 25, 2007 - June 29, 2007	16 — 20	32	33	
5	July 2, 2007 - July 6, 2007	21 — 25	32	34	
6	July 9, 2007 - July 13, 2007	26 — 30	35	39	

== Awards and nominations ==
40th TVB Anniversary Awards (2007) - Nominations

- "Best Drama"
- "Best Actor in a Leading Role" (Michael Tao - Cheung King-Fung)
- "Best Actor in a Leading Role" (Ron Ng - Chung Lap-Man)
- "Best Actor in a Leading Role" (Sammul Chan - Lee Pak-Kiu)
- "Best Actress in a Leading Role" (Sonija Kwok - Winnie Yuen Wai-Nei)
- "Best Actress in a Supporting Role" (Florence Kwok - Tong Ching-Nga)
- "My Favourite Male Character Role" (Ron Ng - Chung Lap-Man)
- "My Favourite Male Character Role" (Sammul Chan - Lee Pak-Kiu)
- "My Favourite Female Character Role" (Sonija Kwok - Winnie Yuen Wai-Nei)
