= List of Moonlight Resonance episodes =

The following is a list of episodes from the TVB drama, Moonlight Resonance which is the indirect sequel to award-winning series, Heart of Greed. The episodes for Moonlight Resonance were rated PG. There were a total of forty episodes. In Hong Kong, episode 39 and 40 were aired together as episode 39.

== List of episodes ==
Episode 1 - 5

Original Air Date	Summary	#
July 28, 2008	The story begins with Hor Ma and Jo Bao fighting over the custody of the six kids: Ka, Ho, Yuet, Yuen, Hing, and Zhong, in 1996. In the end, each gets 3 kids. Hor gets Ho, Yuet, and Ah Hing, while Jo Bao gets Ka, Yuen, and Zhong Jei. The children are tearfully separated while Jo Bao's mother yells at Hor Ma for ruining the lives of her grandchildren. The story then fast-forwards to the children in their early 20s. The three kids on Hor's side go to pick up their aunt, Sa Yi, at the airport. Sa Yi starts venting her frustration when she realizes that the family's business, the Moonlight Bakery, has been taken by Jo Bao. The story then flashes back to 1978. A woman named Hung was hired to work at the Moonlight Bakery, but finds out that her husband has been cheating on her. As a result, she makes a dire mistake with the mooncakes, and only Hor Ma treats her with kindness after the incident. In 1995, the whole family is having a cheerful celebration during the Mid-Autumn Festival, however, Hor Ma soon finds out that Jo Bao and Hung are having an affair. The married couple divorces, which brings us back to the beginning of the episode, with the parents fighting over the kids. Back in the present, Ah Ho bumps into his ex-girlfriend, Ah Tsau, who is also the daughter of Ah Hung. The two think about their past together and Ah Ho reads a card Tsau wrote for him when they were dating.	1
July 29, 2008	Tsau returns home and tells her family that she saw Ho recently, delivering cakes. Jo Bao's mother, Kam Loi Tai, starts a fit when she hears it. She makes a trip to Hor Ma's bakery and yells at Hor Ma for ruining the lives of her grandchildren. Kam Loi Tai says the children will be better off with her side of the family because they are wealthy. Ho would never have to deliver cakes again. Hor Ma pretends nothing happened, but later cries to herself. Ah Ho is concerned about his sister, Ah Hing. She is mute and skipped her chance to go to college to help Hor Ma at the bakery. Ah Ho pushes her to find a different job. The kids use sign language in the kitchen, talking about how rude a guest Sa Yi is. Sa Yi sees this, but is not able to translate the signs properly. Thus, she thinks the children have been talking about how her husband had been cheating on her and how he took all the money. Gong Gong, Hor Ma and Sa Yi's father, explains that no one knew about it except for him. The story goes back to 1996, where Hor Ma's employees threaten to quit because Jo Bao offers a higher pay. Gong Gong's biggest wish is to have his 7 grand-kids (including Tsau) celebrate the Mid-Autumn Festival with him. The next night, Jo Bao visits and agrees to let them celebrate together, but has one condition. He wants them to change the name of their bakery so it's not the Moonlight Bakery anymore. Sa Yi is already very angry that he took the family's store name, and becomes even more angry after hearing his proposal. She takes a broom and kicks him out the house. However, when Gong Gong comes home, he says he doesn't mind changing the store name, as long as he gets to celebrate with his grand-kids.	2
July 30, 2008	Gong Gong starts preparing for the celebration, but a phone call from Jo Bao's cousin, Ah Gong, halts the festivities. Ah Gong says that Kam Loi Tai refuses to let them eat the dinner, but Hor Ma promises Gong Gong that they will. The story goes back to 1995, when Lai Sok, Jo Bao's younger brother, asks Hor Ma for money. She refuses and the next day, she receives news that Lai Sok had committed suicide. Kam Loi Tai thinks that he committed suicide because Hor Ma wouldn't give him money, which is why she still hates Hor Ma today. Back in the present, Ah Hung fires one of her workers, Lin Zhi Yung. Having nowhere to go, and having to pay his sister's college tuition, he seeks refuge with Hor Ma. Hor Ma re-hires him, even though in 1996, he led a bunch of workers to quit and work for Jo Bao instead. Ah Ho asks his brothers to meet him at the bar that night so he can tell them about the Mid Autumn Festival dinner with Gong Gong. However, they barely hear Ah Ho. Ah Ka is obsessed with the stock market, Ah Yuen is having problems with his girlfriend, and Zhong Jei is depressed and drinks. Ah Ho makes them promise they'll come. Later, Hung Yi calls Hor and tells her the dinner is canceled because Hor hired back Lin Zhi Yung. Hor Ma lies and says that she only hired Lin Zhi Yung for short-time work and Hung agrees to let them have the dinner again. The night of the Mid-Autumn Festival, Ah Tsau lies to her mother, saying that she's going out with some friends, while in reality she is going to celebrate with Hor Ma and them. The family is finally having a festive evening together, when Hung and Kam Loi Tai come in and crash the party. Hor Ma and Ah Hung get into a long argument, and eventually the topic of Lai Sok comes up. Hor blames Kam Loi Tai and Jo Bao, asking them why Lai Sok only came to her for help. Lin Zhi Yung then reveals that he is a long time friend of the late Lai Sok. He says Hor Ma is not the reason he committed suicide. Lai Sok was gambling and won, paying back all his debts. However, his girlfriend Lulu betrayed him and left him for another man. That is the real reason he committed suicide, not because of Hor Ma. Hung and Kam Loi Tai storm out in anger and confusion, leaving the family to their dinner.	3
July 31, 2008	While having breakfast, Ah Ka notices that Zhong Jei has been depressed ever since he came back home from Manchester. Hor Ma is also worried, and tries her best to find out what's bothering Ah Zhong. However, he won't open up to her. Back at home, Sa Yi tells Gong Gong that Ah Yuet is a quota because she is adopted. If she wasn't, Zhong Jei would have been given to Hor Ma instead of Jo Bao, and wouldn't be so depressed all the time. Ah Yuet hears this and gets into a big argument with Sa Yi. Later on, Ah Ho finds Ah Hing a job interview as a secretary. He even buys new clothes for her to interview in. However, Ah Ho bumps into Ah Hing when she is supposed to be at her interview. That same day, Sa Yi asks Grampa to borrow 400,000. Ah Yuet sees Grampa withdrawing the large amount and tells Hor Ma. Sa Yi claims she is borrowing the money to hire a lawyer to sue her ex-husband to give her back some of the money. Ah Tsau helps find Ah Hing a new interview, and Ah Ho goes with her this time to make sure she doesn't skip. Ah Hing tries her best at the interview and talks about how she's always been afraid to laugh or cry because no sound came out, but her brother always encouraged her to do her best. She is hired, but is given nothing to do because no one is willing to give her work. She takes the initiative and successfully delivers a package, despite a huge traffic jam and being unable to communicate with anyone. The company is very impressed with her determination and hard-work, and thank her for delivering the package, even though it was late. When Ah Yuet and Ah Hing come home, they find that Sa Yi has purchased two very expensive massage chairs. Sa Yi absentmindly says that she went overseas, gambled the money Gong Gong lent her, lost some, and used what was left to buy the massage chairs. Ah Yuet yells at her and calls her a prostitute. Sa Yi and Ah Yuet get into a huge fight and when Hor Ma and Gong Gong get home, Sa Yi angrily tells them that Ah Yuet accused her of wasting Gong Gong's money and called her a prostitute. Sa Yi shows Hor Ma a receipt from the lawyer, saying that she paid 400,000. Hor Ma tells Ah Yuet to apologize to Sa Yi, and Gong Gong tells her to stay out of his family's business.	4
August 1, 2008	Hor Ma invites Ah Ka to go out and eat. Hor Ma asks Ah Ka how his younger brothers are doing. She gets upset that he doesn't know anything about them and reminds him of the promise he made to her when he was younger. He had promised her that he would go to his dad's side to look after his brothers. Sa Yi asks Gong Gong for another 20,000 and tells him not to tell Hor Ma. Gong Gong agrees, but makes her promise that she'll be nice to Ah Yuet from now on. Sa Yi promises but when she gets home, Ah Yuet acts coldly towards her. Ah Yuet goes out for a walk and Ah Ho follows after her. Ah Yuet says Gong Gong never treated her as family, since he told her to stay out of his family's business. Ah Ho says that Gong Gong is getting old and just slipped up. When they get back home, the family finds out that Sa Yi borrowed more money. Ah Yuet then reveals that she plans to move out and live with one of her friends. Hor Ma says that she is getting older now and should be able to make her own decisions. Ah Yuet is actually renting a flat with his boyfriend and emails Ah Hing that she barely uses any money now. She eats a cheap fast food meal with her boyfriend, and then they go work out at the fitness club. They also take their showers there. All in all, they barely spend 200 Hong Kong dollars a day. Sa Yi sees the pictures Ah Yuet sends to Ah Hing and tells the rest of the family that Ah Yuet is living with a man. Unfortunately, Ah Yuet's boyfriend, Eric, borrowed money and the loan sharks go all the way up to Ah Yuet's work to look for her. Her boss says that if it happens again, she's fired. When she confronts Eric about it, they fight, but make up in the end. Ah Ka is training some dancers for one of his functions when Ah Yuet visits and gives him most of her money. She tells him to play the stock market with it because she needs fast money. The next day, Yuet sends Ah Hing a text message that says the loan sharks came up again and she lost her job. She ran away from home because she was scared the loan sharks would find her. Also, Eric broke up with her because he felt she was too hasty about marriage. Ah Ka lost all of Ah Yuet's money too. Sa Yi sees the message and reads it out to the rest of the family. The whole family rushes to find Ah Yuet, each one apologizing to her and telling her to come home. When she finally does, Hor Ma reprimands Ah Ka for playing the stock market for Ah Yuet, all the while Sa Yi butting in. Finally, Hor Ma reveals that she translated Sa Yi's letter that her lawyer sent her from Portuguese to Chinese. Hor Ma says that the letter says Sa Yi has only a 10% chance of winning. Sa Yi's husband cheated on her, but she also cheated on her husband. Everyone is mad that Sa Yi would just waste Gong Gong's money like that. They all leave for dinner and Sa Yi begs Gong Gong to forgive her. Gong Gong tells Sa Yi to get away from him because he's scared that she'll take away the 80 something dollars he has left.	5

Episode 6 - 10

Original Air Date	Summary	#
August 4, 2008	Episode Confirmed	6
August 5, 2008	Episode Confirmed	7
August 6, 2008	Episode Confirmed	8stuidit
August 7, 2008	Episode Confirmed	9
August 8, 2008	Episode Confirmed	10

Episode 11 - 15

Original Air Date	Summary	#
August 11, 2008	Episode Confirmed	11
August 12, 2008	Episode Confirmed	12
August 13, 2008	Episode Confirmed	13
August 14, 2008	Episode Confirmed	14
August 15, 2008	Episode Confirmed	15

Episode 16 - 20

Original Air Date	Summary	#
August 18, 2008	Episode Confirmed	16
August 19, 2008	Episode Confirmed	17
August 20, 2008	Episode Confirmed	18
August 21, 2008	Episode Confirmed	19
August 22, 2008	Episode Confirmed	20

Episode 21 - 25

Original Air Date	Summary	#
August 25, 2008	Episode Confirmed	21
August 26, 2008	Episode Confirmed	22
August 27, 2008	Episode Confirmed	23
August 28, 2008	Episode Confirmed	24
August 29, 2008	Episode Confirmed	25

Episode 26 - 30

Original Air Date	Summary	#
September 1, 2008	Episode Confirmed	26
September 2, 2008	Episode Confirmed	27
September 3, 2008	Episode Confirmed	28
September 4, 2008	Episode Confirmed	29
September 5, 2008	Episode Confirmed	30

Episode 31 - 35

Original Air Date	Summary	#
September 8, 2008	Episode Confirmed	31
September 9, 2008	Episode Confirmed	32
September 10, 2008	Episode Confirmed	33
September 11, 2008	Episode Confirmed	34
September 12, 2008	Episode Confirmed	35

Episode 36 - 40

Original Air Date	Summary	#
September 15, 2008	Episode Confirmed	36
September 16, 2008	Episode Confirmed	37
September 17, 2008	Episode Confirmed	38
September 18, 2008	Episode Confirmed	39
September 19, 2008	Episode Confirmed	40

== DVD release ==
DVD cover	Language/s	Episodes	Discs	DVD release date
DVD cover	Language/s	Episodes	Discs	Region 3
	Cantonese; Mandarin	40	10	Hong Kong: September 21, 2008
This release of Moonlight Resonance includes all 40 episodes. Special features include a character relationship, series promotions and bloopers.

== See also ==
- Moonlight Resonance
- Heart of Greed
- List of TVB series (2007)
