= A Chip Off the Old Block =

Hong Kong television series

- Promo poster
- 巴不得爸爸
- Genre: Comedy
- Created by: Poon Ka-tak
- Written by: Chan Kam-ling
- Starring: Ron Ng; Sunny Chan; Myolie Wu; Shirley Yeung; David Chiang; Gigi Wong; Nancy Wu; Louis Yuen; Carlo Ng; Mandy Wong
- Theme music composer: Chow Wing Hang
- Opening theme: "Don't Say I Didn't Mind You" (咪話唔就你) by Ron Ng and Myolie Wu
- Country of origin: Hong Kong
- Original language: Cantonese
- No. of episodes: 21

Production
- Executive producer: Poon Ka-tak
- Production location: Hong Kong
- Camera setup: Multi camera
- Running time: 45 mins.
- Production company: TVB

Original release
- Network: TVB Jade
- Release: November 30 – December 27, 2009

A Chip Off the Old Block
- Title screen shot
- Traditional Chinese: 巴不得爸爸...
- Simplified Chinese: 巴不得爸爸...
- Literal meaning: "Anxious Father"
Transcriptions
Standard Mandarin
- Hanyu Pinyin: Bā Bù Dé Bà Bà
Yue: Cantonese
- Jyutping: Ba1 Bat1 Dak1 Ba1 Ba1

A Chip Off the Old Block (Traditional Chinese: 巴不得爸爸...) is a 2009 TVB television drama from Hong Kong produced and created by Poon Ka Tak. The original broadcast was on the TVB Jade with approximately 45-minute-long episodes airing five days a week. The final two episodes were an hour and a half long each, which aired during the weekends. A Chip Off the Old Block tells the story of the articulate businessman Chor Chi, who accidentally travels back in time to the 1960s and meets his younger father, Chor Fan.

== Plot ==
"With a distinguished father such as you,
the son is sure to do well".

However, for this pair of Father and son, it is quite difficult because both of them have different characters, different way of doing things, and even their life goals are totally different from each other. Father Chor Fan (Sunny Chan) has feelings still like a man in the 60s, but Son Chor Chi (Ron Ng) finds that he is too slow compared to others who are living in the 21st century.

Chor Chi from the 21st Century goes back in time to the 60s when his father was in his youth. The Father and Son became best of brothers. Chor Chi offends many people and seldom greets others. Hence, he isn't well liked by other neighbours. There is only Chor Fan who protects him all the time and even introduces him to a job at a departmental store. However, Chor Chi, who is over-ambitious, only knows how to blame his father for being too old-fashioned and allows others to take advantage of him. Chor Chi causes many problems, including causing many other neighbours to lose their homes. When he finally begins to regret his actions and tries to fix them, he finds that he has travelled back to the 21st century...

This is a comedy which shows a travel in time. The circumstances that happen will not only cause positive aftertaste, but allows one to think about the meaning behind "There's no inborn talent to become a powerful person overnight; A good man should work hard and stand up strong on his own feet."

== Cast ==
The tenants

Cast	Role	Description
Ron Ng	Chor Chi 楚慈	a 28-year-old well-established businessman who works for a cigarette company. His father is extremely unhappy with his "life-stealing" job and often urges him to work at a different company. Although filial to his father, Chi is annoyed with his father's old-fashioned beliefs and their relationship becomes strained. During a dangerous wet storm, Chi accidentally gets himself warped back in time to 1960s Hong Kong, where he meets his younger father. Later becomes Ching Lan-Fun's boyfriend.
Sunny Chan	Chor Fan 楚帆	Chi's altruistic and self-sacrificing father. Fan always places others benefits before his own and is known for saying the phrase, "Everyone for me, I for everyone." Fan was adopted by Ko Shan-chuen, who owns a small dumplings shop in Fung Shui Lei. Fan becomes good friends with Chi, not knowing that Chi is actually his son from forty years later.
Myolie Wu	So Fung-Nei 蘇鳳妮	a con artist Later becomes Chor Fan's girlfriend. Fung-lin's older sister
Shirley Yeung	Ching Lan-Fun 程蘭芬	the landlady's daughter. Go to 2006's Hong Kong at last. Later becomes Chor Chi's girlfriend.
David Chiang	Ko Shan-chuen 高山泉	Ching Lan-Fan's foster father. Later becomes Tam Lan-ching's Husband
Gigi Wong	Tam Lan-ching 譚蘭青	the landlady. Later on becomes Ko Shan-Chuen's wife
Louis Yuen	Ngau Ching-wing 牛正榮	a police officer Chiu Mau-Dan's husband Ngau Ka-Po's father
Carlo Ng	Shing Sap-yee 成拾義	the only son of the wealthy Shing family Husband of Yue Fa and Yue Yuk
Mandy Wong	So Fung-lin 蘇鳳蓮	Fung-Nei's younger sister
Natalie Wong	Yue Fa 余花	Sap-yee's official wife
Irene Wong	Yue Yuk 余玉	Sap-yee's second wife and Fa's younger sister

The Dor Dor Department Store personnel

Cast	Role	Description
Nancy Wu	Leung Pin-pin 梁翩翩	Leung Ting-dor's only daughter Introduced in ep.11
Lo Tsan Shun	Cheng Kwan-min 鄭坤綿	Dor Dor's store general manager cheats the tenants
Chun Wong	Leung Ting-dor 梁亭多	Dor Dor's chairman, who used to work as a chef in Sap-yee's home, Pin-pin's father
Lee Fung	Tse Dai-bik 謝帶壁	Ting-dor's wife and Pin-pin's mother
Li Ka Sing	Manager Lam 藍部長	in charge of Dor Dor's employee management.

== Viewership ratings ==
	Week	Episodes	Average Points	Peaking Points	References
1	November 30 - December 3, 2009	1 — 4	31	35	
2	December 7–10, 2009	5 — 8	30	33	
3	December 14–18, 2009	9 — 13	30	—	
4	December 21–25, 2009	14 — 18/19	28	—	
4	December 27, 2009	20/21	33	37	

== Sequel ==
A second installment, A Chip Off the Old Block II (Chinese: 巴不得媽媽... jyutping: Ba1 Bat1 Dak1 Ma1 Ma1; literally "anxious mother"), was announced in January 2010. However, official production for the sequel did not start until January 2012, with Poon Ka-tak returning to produce. In February 2012, Liza Wang, Mandy Wong, Him Law, and Gigi Wong were announced to star in the sequel. In March 2012, Chung King-fai and Chin Kar-lok were confirmed to join. In April 2012, Jade Leung joined the cast. Leung's last production with TVB was the 2004 blockbuster television drama War and Beauty.

== Awards and nominations ==
TVB Anniversary Awards (2010)

- Nominated: Best Drama - Top 5
- Nominated: Best Actor (Ron Ng)
- Nominated: Best Actress (Myolie Wu)
- Nominated: Best Supporting Actor (John Chiang)
- Nominated: My Favourite Male Character (Sunny Chan)
- Nominated: My Favourite Female Character (Myolie Wu)

== International Broadcast ==
- Malaysia - 8TV (Malaysia)
