= Flying Tiger 2 =

Hong Kong police crime drama series

- 飛虎之雷霆極戰
- Genre: Crime drama; Police Procedural
- Starring: Michael Miu; Bosco Wong; Kenneth Ma; Ron Ng; Lawrence Ng; Joel Chan; Yoyo Mung; Kelly Cheung; Michael Wong; Oscar Leung; Jacky Cai
- Opening theme: "Breathing Is Hazardous" by Karen Mok
- Ending theme: "Reunion" by Raymond Lam and MC Jin
- Original language: Cantonese
- No. of episodes: 30

Production
- Producers: Virginia Lok; Cha Chuen Yee
- Production locations: Hong Kong; England
- Running time: 45 minutes
- Production company: Shaw Brothers Studio: Youku

Original release
- Network: Youku
- Release: 6 September 2019

Related
- Flying Tiger; Flying Tiger 3

Flying Tiger 2 (Chinese: 飛虎之雷霆極戰) is a 2019 Hong Kong action crime drama television series jointly produced by Shaw Brothers Studios and Youku. It stars Michael Miu, Bosco Wong, Kenneth Ma, Ron Ng, Lawrence Ng, Joel Chan, Yoyo Mung and Kelly Cheung as the main leads. It is created by Cha Chuen Yee, Raymond Lee and Billy Tang. Flying Tiger 2 is the second installment of the Flying Tiger franchise, featuring a new storyline. The series first premiered on Youku on 6 September 2019.

== Synopsis ==
An unknown group is behind a series of crimes in Hong Kong, putting the safety of the city and its citizens at risk. A secret anti-terror task force, A Team, is formed under Lok Ka Sing (Michael Miu), the commander of the Flying Tigers (Special Duties Unit) directly reporting to the commissioner of police, to uncover who is behind the series of crimes. The team consists of Wang Gwok Dong (Bosco Wong), Cheung Man Long (Ron Ng), Ting Hou Yin (Kenneth Ma), Mou Yat Man (Jacky Cai), and Yiu Ga Nam (Jennifer Yu). A Team members find there are foreign secret agents trying to gain intelligence in Hong Kong while evidence leads Lok Sir to conclude that Au Yeung Ching (Dominic Lam) is running an underground syndicate in Hong Kong behind the scene. Meanwhile, Ho Chun (Joel Chan) returns to Hong Kong to avenge the past, revealing a dark secrets behind a police raid in 1997 which involves Wang Gwok Dong and Cheung Man Long father.

== Cast ==
- Michael Miu as Lok Ka Sing, Chief Superintendent of the Special Duties Unit and leader of A Team. Appointed as Deputy Commissioner of Police (Operation) at episode 26.
- Bosco Wong as Eddie Wong Gwok Dong, Senior Inspector of the Regional Crime Unit and A Team Assault Group leader; previously was an MI6 agent before joining Hong Kong Police.
- Kenneth Ma as Ting Ho Yin, Senior Inspector of the Criminal Intelligence Bureau and A Team Intelligence Group leader.
- Ron Ng as Cheung Man Long, Senior Inspector of the Narcotics Bureau and A Team Investigation Group leader.
- Jennifer Yu as Yiu Ka Nam, Senior Inspector of the Identification Bureau and A Team Support Group leader.
- Lawrence Ng as Paul Poon, Commissioner of Police
- Jacky Cai as Mo Yat Man, Probation Inspector working under Ting Ho Yin, A Team computer hacker
- Joel Chan as Ho Chun, a triad leader who worked with terrorists
- Kelly Cheung as Jean Yau Ho Yuet, MI6 agent and Public Relations & Advertising Manager (identity cover-up)
- Michael Wong as Brown, Senior Superintendent of SDU
- Oscar Leung as Tong Wing Fei, police informer/undercover who later become a desk-bound police sergeant.
- Christine Kuo as Yan Ting, wife of Ting Ho Yin
- Zoie Tam as Or Man Ying, a triad leader under Au Yeung Ching
- David Chiang as Wong Kwok Keung, Eddie's father and retired police inspector
- Dominic Lam as Au Yeung Ching, a businessman and a triad leader
- Yoyo Mung as Au Yeung Man Yi, Au Yeung Ching's daughter who in love with Lok Ka Sing.
- James Ng as Ben Wong Chi Bun, younger brother of Eddie Wong Gwok Dong, computer hacker. Targeted by MI6 and terrorists to create weapon control program.
- Moon Lau as Ting Siu Kwan, younger sister of Ting Ho Yin, personal assistant to Hong Kong Legislative member.
- Pat Poon as Lee Chong Sing, Secretary of Security Bureau
- Timothy Cheng as Tsui Wang Yip, Deputy Secretary of Security Bureau
- Zeno Koo as Fat, the son of a store owner
- Rebecca Chan as Lam Wai, wife of Au Yeung Ching
- Lee Pace (special guest star) as Sam Colin, an MI6 agent who is Jean Yau's superior.
- Liza Wang (special guest star) as Chief Executive of Hong Kong
- Corinna Chamberlain (special guest star) as Lok Sir’s informant Tom
- Dhillon Singh as General Jaser, a European warlord and the mastermind behind the terrorist attacks.
- Julian Benedikt Gaertner as Jacky Koo, the right-hand man of Jaser and the leader of the mercenaries
- Steven Cheung Chi-hang (special guest star) as Ryan Lee, Au Yeung Ching businessman partner
- Evergreen Mak Cheung-ching as Wan Hoi, an news office leader

== Development and Production ==
After the filming of Flying Tiger, Shaw Brothers confirmed they intended to film a sequel series, with filming commencing in late 2018. Main cast members Michael Miu, Bosco Wong, Ron Ng, and Oscar Leung from the first installment were confirmed to return for season 2. In September 2018, American actor Lee Pace was cast. Filming for Flying Tiger 2 began in October 2018 and concluded in early February 2019, primarily in Hong Kong, and some scenes in the United Kingdom.

== Broadcast ==
The series made its premiere on streaming website Youku on 6 September 2019. In Hong Kong, it made its premiere on TVB on 18 May 2020. In the China version of the broadcast, mentions of Russia and the United Kingdom were changed to fictional countries.
