= Men in Pain =

- Promo poster
- 男人之苦
- Genre: Modern Drama
- Starring: Damian Lau; Ron Ng; Louisa So; Toby Leung
- Ending theme: "金剛" by Ron Ng
- Country of origin: Hong Kong
- Original language: Cantonese
- No. of episodes: 21

Production
- Running time: 45 minutes (approx.)

Original release
- Network: TVB
- Release: June 13 – July 9, 2006

Related
- La Femme Desperado (2006)

Men in Pain (Traditional Chinese: 男人之苦) is a TVB modern drama series broadcast in June 2006.

== Synopsis ==
Hong Tin-Yam (Damian Lau) is happily married to his second wife Wong Dak-Kiu (Louisa So), but one day he discovers that he cannot perform in the bedroom. He asked a female friend, Au Yeung Lei-Lei (Akina Hong), to help him out and confirmed that he was in fact impotent. Tin-Yam did not want his wife to find out about his problem causes Dak-Kiu to think that he is cheating on her, and leading to their divorce.

On the other hand, Tin-Yam's son, Hong Sai-Hei (Ron Ng) spends a night with Dak-Kiu's student, Ko Fun (Toby Leung) during an excursion. Ko Fun discovers that she is pregnant and seeks Sai-Hei's help. Both their parents are furious but eventually the two young couples get married. Ko Fun is stressed with handling the baby and her school courseload, while Sai-Hei is worried that he cannot afford to put food on the table.

How will these two men overcome their pain of manhood...?

== Cast ==
Cast	Role	Description
Damian Lau	Hong Tin-Yam 康天任	Wong Dak-Kiu's husband. Hong Sai-Hei's father.
Louisa So	Wong Dak-Kiu 黃德蕎	Teacher; Hong Tin-Yam's second wife. Hong Sai-Hei's stepmother.
Ron Ng	Hong Sai-Hei 康世熙	Hong Tin-Yam's son. Ko Fun's husband.
Toby Leung	Ko Fun 高芬	Hong Sai-Hei's wife.
Wu Fung	Wong Kai-Cheung 黃啟昌	Wong Dak-Kiu, Wong Dak-Lan, and Wong Dak-Wai's father.
Rebecca Chan	Wong Dak-Lan 黃德蘭	Wong Dak-Kiu and Wong Dak-Wai's older sister.
Lee Shing-Cheung	Li Chun-Chi 李振馳	Wong Dak-Lan's husband.
Florence Kwok	Wong Dak-Wai 黃德蕙	Wong Dak-Kiu and Wong Dak-Lan's younger sister.
Law Lok Lam (羅樂林)	Ko Wai 高威	Ko Fun's father.
Rocky Cheng (鄭健樂)	Shek Hak-Lung (Rocky) 石克龍	Ko Fun's uncle.
Patrick Dunn	Yeung Jin-Cheung 楊展翔	Wong Dak-Kiu's colleague.
Akina Hong (康華)	Au Yeung Lei-Lei 歐陽莉莉	Hong Tin-Yam's friend.

== Viewership ratings ==
	Week	Episode	Average Points	Peaking Points	References
1	June 13–16, 2006	1 — 4	28	29	
2	June 19–23, 2006	5 — 9	30	34	
3	June 26–30, 2006	10 — 14	32	36	
4	July 3–7, 2006	15 — 19	32	36	
4	July 9, 2006	20 — 21	38	39	
