= Flying Tiger 3 =

Hong Kong crime action drama series

- 飛虎之壯志英雄
- Starring: Michael Miu; Bosco Wong; Ron Ng; Cheung Siu-fai; Joe Ma; Moses Chan; Roger Kwok; Oscar Leung; Edwin Siu; Elaine Yiu; Jeannie Chan; Sisley Choi; Rebecca Zhu; Jacky Cai; Alice Chan; Michael Wong
- Original language: Cantonese

Production
- Producer: Virginia Lok
- Production company: Shaw Brothers Studio

Related
- Flying Tiger; Flying Tiger 2

Flying Tiger 3 (Chinese: 飛虎3壯志英雄) is a crime action drama web television series produced by Shaw Brothers Studio. It is the third installment of the Flying Tiger franchise. Produced by Virginia Lok, the series stars Michael Miu, Bosco Wong, Ron Ng, Cheung Siu-fai, Joe Ma, Moses Chan, Roger Kwok, Oscar Leung and Edwin Siu as the main cast.

== Synopsis ==
The terrorist organization “Argunbia" infiltrated Hong Kong and set off a battle for chemical weapons in Hong Kong. Fan Siu-fung (Moses Chan), the commander of the Special Duties Unit (SDU), was ordered to fight against the terrorists. The SDU are trapped in the ruthless killing of “Wakanbo”, leading to the Special Service Superintendent Chin Bok-man (Joe Ma) to assemble the police elites Cheung Wai-wah (Eddie Cheung), Cheung Ka-hin (Bosco Wong) and Ko Chi-lok (Ron Ng), to form a secret counter-terrorism team: S Team. In the face of many crises, with the assistance of Interpol Hui Chun-fei (Michael Miu), the generations of their grievances and feuds are put aside and they join forces to prevent the spread of the chemical weapon virus in Hong Kong.

== Cast ==
=== Main cast ===
- Michael Miu as Mike Hui Chun-fei (許俊飛), a special agent with Interpol and a former friend of Chin Bok-man and Cheung Wai-wah after an accident during their young SDU days. Working under Taylor Smith, he worked independently adjacently from the Hong Kong Police's S-Team against the Argunbia family until the emergence of the DH-2 virus. After being framed by Taylor for John Li's death, he cleared his name exposed his boss as a member of Infinity, later taking over his position as Interpol superintendent after the latter's death.
  - Telford Wong as the youth version of Mike.
- Bosco Wong as Cheung Ka-hin (張嘉軒), Senior Inspector of Police in the SDU who was recruited into S-Team. Though partnered with Ho Ka-bo, the two have feelings for one another. In the final episode, Hui Sum poisoned him with a mutated version of the DH-2 virus, but he was given an antidote by Choi Sui-pui.
- Ron Ng as Ko Chi-lok (高子樂), Senior Inspector of Police in the SDU who was recruited into S-Team. He had feelings for fellow SDU member Yu Hiu-yau, but her accident that ultimately resulted in her death promoted Lok to resign from the Police Force and work undercover as To Yee-ying's bodyguard to To Man-bun.
- Cheung Siu-fai as Don Cheung Wai-wah (張偉樺) or Don sir, Chief Inspector of Police in the SDU. He led S Team along with Chin Bok-man and Hui Chun-fei friend.
  - Kalok Chow as the youth version of Don.
- Joe Ma as Chin Bok-man (展博文), Superintendent of Police of the SDU. He replaced Fan Siu-fung as the head of the SDU after a horrible loss that resulted in the latter's death. To combat against the Argunia family and DH-2, he created S-Team and recruited officers from different departments.
  - Ricco Ng as the youth version of Chin.
- Moses Chan as Fan Siu-fung (范少鋒), Superintendent of Police of the SDU. He was killed by a bazooka while attempting to save Yu Hiu-yan.
  - Arnold Kwok as the youth version of Fan.
- Roger Kwok as To Man-bun (杜文彬), founder and CEO of Wide Sky Pharmaceuticals whose microbiologist team had accidentally created the DH-2 virus years ago. Recognizing the deadly effects of it, research of it was assumed to be destroyed but actually taken by his wife who had been held captive for five years. With terrorists arriving in Hong Kong, they target him to force him to remake DH-2.
- Oscar Leung as Hui Sum (許森), a childhood friend of Cheung Ka-kin and a biologist working at Wide Sky Pharmaceuticals. Secretly the son of Tung Kai-Chiu, he has a secret agenda as a member of Infinity that includes taking out both Buysu and Wide Sky to gain DH-2 for the organization.
- Edwin Siu as Choi Siu-pui (蔡肇培), a homeless scientist who is the only one with knowledge of the formula to make DH-2. Both sides of the society, the law and the underground are in search of him for his formula.

=== Supporting cast ===
- Elaine Yiu as To Yee-ying (杜以盈), the younger sister of To Man-bun. She hires Lok to be her bodyguard, not knowing his true motive for doing so.
- Jeannie Chan as Ho Ka-bo (何家寶), Senior Inspector of Police of OCT-B who was recruited to S Team. Out in the field, she is Hin's partner and they both have feelings for one another.
- Sisley Choi as Yu Hiu-yan (余曉欣), a SDU member whom Lok had feelings for. After the mall attack that resulted in a heavy loss for the SDU, she went into a coma and later died of her brain injuries.
- Rebecca Zhu as Natalie Chin Man-li (展敏莉), Café owner, Chin Bok-man's younger sister. She helped Hui Chun-fei, who was wanted for John's murder and helps him nurse his injuries. She runs a small cafe called SP_CE.
- Jacky Cai as Jasmine Song Kit-yee (宋潔怡), a college student and intern reporter. She is the late Fan Siu-fung's stepdaughter who was left completely orphaned following his death. She approaches Hui Sum for news information, inadvertently leading to her unwanted attack and Tung Kai-Chiu's death.
- Alice Chan as Tina Or Tsz-sin (柯芷倩), Don's ambitious journalist wife. Their conflicting values towards life results in their divorce, though they have stayed friends.
- Michael Wong as Taylor Smith, Hui Chun-fei's Interpol superior. He was a member of the mysterious underground terrorist organization, Infinity, and used and framed Hui Chun-Fei to get Choi Siu-pui then later he killed himself.
- Akina Hong as To Man-bun wife who was kidnapped to force her husband into making DH-2.
- Hugo Wong as a SDU member. He was recruited to S Team.
- Andrew Yuen Man-kit as Hong Kong Police commissioner
- Kelly Fu as JJ, a Hui Sum partner
- Jai Day as Leo Argunbia (里奥, 瓦干布), leader of the terrorist group Argunbia. He was approached by the mysterious underground terrorist organization members online secretly, unknowing that he was being used.
- Charlene Houghton as Renee Argunbia (蕾妮, 瓦干布), sister of Leo, and assistant leader of the terrorist group Argunbia.
- Karl Ting as Ko Chung-sing (高忠成), a former SDU commander who died in an operation 15 years ago. He is good friends with Chin Bok-man, Cheung Wai-wah, Fan Siu-fung, and Hui Chun-fei. He is the older brother of Ko Chi-lok; he had a crush on Bok-man's sister, Natalie Chin Man-li.
- Philippe Joly as Ivan (伊萬)
- Daniel Chau Chi Hong as Chiu Wai Keung (趙偉強).
- Adrian Chau Chi Man as a member of the Major Crimes Unit.
- Jeremy Wong as John Li, an Interpol member. He followed his superior Taylor Smith's order and indirectly helped him frame Hui Chun-fei by being killed by Taylor. Later found out to be part of the mysterious underground organization, Infinity.
- Mike Leeder as Bol'shoy Mikrofon.
- Mike Powers as US SWAT Advisor Hondo
- Chris Collins as US SWAT Commander Collins.
- Liviu Covalschi as US Swat Advisor Keno.

== Production ==
In October 2019, Shaw Brothers announced their intention to produce a third instalment after the popularity of the first two Flying Tiger series. Core cast members Michael Miu, Bosco Wong, Ron Ng, Cheung Siu-fai and Oscar Leung from the first instalment were confirmed to return for the series, with the addition of Joe Ma, who was unable to film the first two series due to scheduling conflicts, and also Roger Kwok and Moses Chan. Filming was originally set to begin in March 2020, but was pushed back to July 2020 due to the COVID-19 pandemic. Ron Ng revealed that the series will feature new female cast members.

On Nov 29, 2021, G.E.M. released the theme song Double You in Cantonese and Double Me in Mandarin for this series.

Then, on Dec 9, 2021, the trailer in Mandarin for this series came out as well as promotional posters of the characters; the air date was set to December 16, 2021, and aired on Chinese streaming platform Youku.

On Feb 10, 2022, TVB had its first Flying Tiger 3 premiere; promoting the drama.

== Broadcast ==
In Hong Kong, the episode series premiered will be starting on Feb 21, 2022 on TVB.
