= Wax and Wane =

Hong Kong television drama

- Official poster
- 團圓
- Genre: Drama
- Starring: Roger Kwok; Sunny Chan; Ron Ng; Kate Tsui; Lau Siu-ming; Toby Leung; Him Law; Benz Hui; Chow Chung; Derek Kok; Claire Yiu; Oscar Leung; Florence Kwok
- Country of origin: Hong Kong
- Original language: Cantonese
- No. of episodes: 30

Production
- Producer: Nelson Cheung
- Production location: Hong Kong
- Editors: Yuen Siu-na; Yip Sai-hong
- Camera setup: Multi camera
- Running time: 45 minutes (per episode)
- Production company: TVB

Original release
- Network: TVB Jade
- Release: 13 June – 22 July 2011

Related
- My Sister of Eternal Flower; The Life and Times of a Sentinel

Wax and Wane
- intertitle
- Traditional Chinese: 團圓
- Simplified Chinese: 团圆
- Literal meaning: "Reunion"
Transcriptions
Standard Mandarin
- Hanyu Pinyin: Tuán Yuán
Yue: Cantonese
- Jyutping: Tyun4 Jyun4

Wax and Wane (Traditional Chinese: 團圓) is a 2011 Hong Kong television drama produced by Television Broadcasts Limited (TVB), with Nelson Cheung serving as the executive producer. The drama follows the story of two rival families, dealing with themes of revenge, greed, business affairs, and family.

== Plot ==
Yung Shing-fun (Lau Siu-ming) and his cousin Man Wing-cheong (Chow Chung) have been at odds for years, over the trade name rights of their family's noodle shop.

Eugene (Roger Kwok), Fun's eldest son engages in a property development project in order to solve the problem. Unwillingly, he offers to buy out the location of Cheong's noodle shop with his company's shares. He also invites Cheong and his son, Fung (Sunny Chan), to join the company's management.

Eugene actually has ulterior motives for doing this, as he hates Fung to the core for marrying his girlfriend Ko Wai-ting (Florence Kwok). On top of this, Eugene's younger brother, Gary (Ron Ng), is going out with Cheong's second daughter, Peace (Kate Tsui), regardless of his family's opposition.

Now, Eugene is at his wits' end as he has to handle his family issues single-handedly. He never understood what family ties really meant, nor had he the courage to try to find it out, until now.

== Production ==
Pre-production and character casting began September 2009. Roger Kwok and Derek Kok were cast first; upon hearing this, Ron Ng explained that he turned down two mainland Chinese drama offers in order to fit his schedule to film Wax and Wane with Kwok. Myolie Wu was also reported to have been part of the project, but later dropped out due to scheduling conflicts.

A costume fitting and press conference for the drama was held on 12 January 2010, and filming began the following week. A blessing ceremony was held on 9 March 2010. Filming ended 22 April 2010, taking a full four months to complete.

== Cast and characters ==
=== Yung family ===
- Yung Shing-fun (portrayed by Lau Siu Ming): The patriarch of the Yung family. He is the younger maternal cousin and rival of Man Wing-cheong.
- Kwong Lai-ying (portrayed by Manna Chan): Fun's wife.(Deceased in episode 16)
- Wong Sau-ping (portrayed by Claire Yiu): Fun's mistress.
- Eugene Yung Yi-Chun (portrayed by Roger Kwok): Fun and Ying's eldest son.
- Maggie Yung Yi-lam (portrayed by Irene Wong): Fun and Ying's daughter.
- Gary Yung Yi-hang (portrayed by Ron Ng): Fun and Ying's youngest son who is dating Peace, Cheong's daughter. Now married to her.

=== Man family ===
- Man Fa-tung (portrayed by Lily Leung): Fun's maternal aunt and Cheong's paternal aunt.
- Man Wing-cheong (portrayed by Chow Chung): The older maternal cousin and rival of Fun.
- Man Kar-fung, nicknamed Funky (portrayed by Sunny Chan): Cheong's eldest son.
- Ko Wai-ting (portrayed by Florence Kwok): Fung's wife and Eugene's ex-girlfriend.
- Peace Man Ka-fu, nicknamed Fully (portrayed by Kate Tsui): Cheong's youngest daughter and Fung's younger sister who has been dating Gary, Fun's youngest son. Now married to him.
- Ho Kar-moon, nicknamed Moonie (portrayed by Toby Leung): Cheong's niece and Fun's daughter.
- Roy Lai Pak-hei (portrayed by Him Law): A lawyer and Cheong's godson.

=== Other characters ===
- Wong Hung (portrayed by Derek Kok): Ping's older brother a.k.a. Ping's husband
- Chan Yat-chung (portrayed by Benz Hui): Fun's personal assistant.
- Chan Chik-man (portrayed by Oscar Leung): Chung's son.
- Lee Kiu (portrayed by Ha Ping): Ying's mother and Fun's mother-in-law.
- Zita Wah Hoi_lai (portrayed by Becky Lee): Daughter of a land developer tycoon.

== Episodes ==
| No. | Title | Original release date |
|---|---|---|
| 1 | "Episode 1" | June 13, 2011 |
| 2 | "Episode 2" | June 14, 2011 |
| 3 | "Episode 3" | June 15, 2011 |
| 4 | "Episode 4" | June 16, 2011 |
| 5 | "Episode 5" | June 17, 2011 |
| 6 | "Episode 6" | June 20, 2011 |
| 7 | "Episode 7" | June 21, 2011 |
| 8 | "Episode 8" | June 22, 2011 |
| 9 | "Episode 9" | June 23, 2011 |
| 10 | "Episode 10" | June 24, 2011 |
| 11 | "Episode 11" | June 27, 2011 |
| 12 | "Episode 12" | June 28, 2011 |
| 13 | "Episode 13" | June 29, 2011 |
| 14 | "Episode 14" | June 30, 2011 |
| 15 | "Episode 15" | July 1, 2011 |
| 16 | "Episode 16" | July 4, 2011 |
| 17 | "Episode 17" | July 5, 2011 |
| 18 | "Episode 18" | July 6, 2011 |
| 19 | "Episode 19" | July 7, 2011 |
| 20 | "Episode 20" | July 8, 2011 |
| 21 | "Episode 21" | July 11, 2011 |
| 22 | "Episode 22" | July 12, 2011 |
| 23 | "Episode 23" | July 13, 2011 |
| 24 | "Episode 24" | July 14, 2011 |
| 25 | "Episode 25" | July 15, 2011 |
| 26 | "Episode 26" | July 18, 2011 |
| 27 | "Episode 27" | July 19, 2011 |
| 28 | "Episode 28" | July 20, 2011 |
| 29 | "Episode 29" | July 21, 2011 |
| 30 | "Episode 30" | July 22, 2011 |

== Awards and nominations ==
=== 45th TVB Anniversary Awards 2011 ===
- Nominated: Best Drama
- Nominated: Best Actor (Roger Kwok)
- Nominated: Best Actor (Ron Ng)
- Nominated: Best Supporting Actress (Mannor Chan)
- Nominated: Best Supporting Actress (Florence Kwok)
- Nominated: My Favourite Female Character (Toby Leung)

== Viewership ratings ==
| | Week | Episodes | Average Points | Peaking Points | References |
|---|---|---|---|---|---|
| 1 | June 13–17, 2011 | 1 — 5 | 25 | 29 | |
| 2 | June 20–24, 2011 | 6 — 10 | 26 | 29 | |
| 3 | June 27 - July 1, 2011 | 11 — 15 | 26 | 30 | |
| 4 | July 4–8, 2011 | 16 — 20 | 27 | 31 | |
| 5 | July 11–15, 2011 | 21 — 25 | 27 | 32 | |
| 6 | July 18–22, 2011 | 26 — 30 | 27 | 34 | |
