= Lost in the Chamber of Love =

- 西廂奇緣
- Genre: Costume Drama
- Starring: Ron Ng; Myolie Wu; Michelle Ye; Kenneth Ma
- Opening theme: "嫁衣裳" by Ron Ng & Myolie Wu
- Country of origin: Hong Kong
- Original language: Cantonese
- No. of episodes: 20

Production
- Running time: 45 minutes (approx.)

Original release
- Network: TVB
- Release: February 14 – March 11, 2005

Lost in the Chamber of Love (Traditional Chinese: 西廂奇緣) is a TVB costume drama series released overseas in December 2004 and broadcast on TVB Jade Channel in February 2005.

== Synopsis ==
Cheung Kwan-Sui (Ron Ng) and Hung Leung (Myolie Wu) each picks up one half of a matching jade at a lantern fair. However, they do not meet each other that night. At the same fair, Sui saves the Governor's daughter Chui Ang-Ang (Michelle Ye) from some kidnappers. The Governor's wife promises to marry Ang-Ang to him in order to thank him. Nevertheless, she denies her promise later and demands him to become a royal scholar before Sui can marry Ang-Ang. He moves into the West Chamber, their guesthouse, and studies hard.

The Emperor Tong Dak-Chung (Kenneth Ma) meets Ang Ang when he is traveling incognito under the name of Bun. He is shocked by her beauty. They get on very well. However, Ang-Ang is deterred to develop further in their relationship by her engagement with Sui. Apart from this love triangle, there is one more girl Leung, who loves Sui at the first sight. Leung is Ang-Ang's servant and best friend. She has to hide her feelings for Sui although she cares a lot about Ang-Ang's decision in choosing between Bun and Shui. Meanwhile, the imperial court sets out a search for a Tibetan princess who is engaged to the Emperor, but has gone missing. Secrets about their lives are suddenly revealed and will change their destiny...

== Cast ==
=== The Chui family ===
Cast	Role	Description
Wong Ching (王青)	Chui Pang 崔鵬	Governor; Chui Cheng Chiu-Kuen's husband. Chui Ang-Ang and Chui Kwok-Foon's father. Hung Leung's biological father.
Bak Yan (白茵)	Chui Cheng Chiu-Kuen 崔鄭肖娟	Chui Pang's wife. Chui Ang-Ang and Chui Kwok-Foon's mother. Hung Leung's biological mother.
Michelle Ye	Chui Ang-Ang 崔鶯鶯	Chui Pang and Chui Cheng Chiu-Kuen's daughter. Chui Kwok-Foon's older sister. Cheung Kwan-Sui's ex-lover. Tong Dak-Chung's true love. Princess Tibet
Siu Fai Yung (蕭徽勇)	Chui Kwok-Foon 崔國歡	Chui Pang and Chui Cheng Chiu-Kuen's son. Chui Ang-Ang's younger brother.
Celine Ma (馬蹄露)	Ho Yuk-Lin 何玉蓮	Chui Cheng Choi-Kuen's younger cousin.
Mimi Chu (朱咪咪)	Ma Sau-Chu 馬秀珠	Servant; Hung Leung's aunt. Tibet concubine
Myolie Wu	Hung Leung 紅娘	Servant; Cheung Kwan-Sui's true love.

=== The Cheung family ===
Cast	Role	Description
Teresa Ha (夏萍)	Cheung Li-See 張李氏	Cheung Lim-Yan, Cheung Kwan-Sui, and Cheung Lim-Wai's grandmother.
Kiki Sheung (商天娥)	Cheung Lim-Yan 張念恩	Cheung Kwan-Sui and Cheung Lim-Wai's older sister. To Fai's lover.
Ron Ng	Cheung Kwan-Sui 張君瑞	Scholar; Cheung Lim-Yan and Cheung Lim-Wai's brother. Chui Ang-Ang's ex-lover. Hung Leung's true love.
Nancy Wu	Cheung Lim-Wai 張念惠	Cheung Lim-Yan and Cheung Kwan-Sui's younger sister.

=== Other cast ===
Cast	Role	Description
Kenneth Ma	Tong Dak-Chung 唐德宗	Emperor; Chui Ang-Ang's true love.
Benz Hui	To Fai/Wong Sam 杜輝/鄭森	Emperor's Servant; Cheung Lim-Yan's lover.
Savio Tsang (曾偉權)	Pat Wong-Ye 八皇爺	King's uncle. Rebellion
Power Chan	Sue Fei-Fu 孫飛虎	Cheung Lim-Wai's lover
