= Florence Kwok =

Hong Kong actress

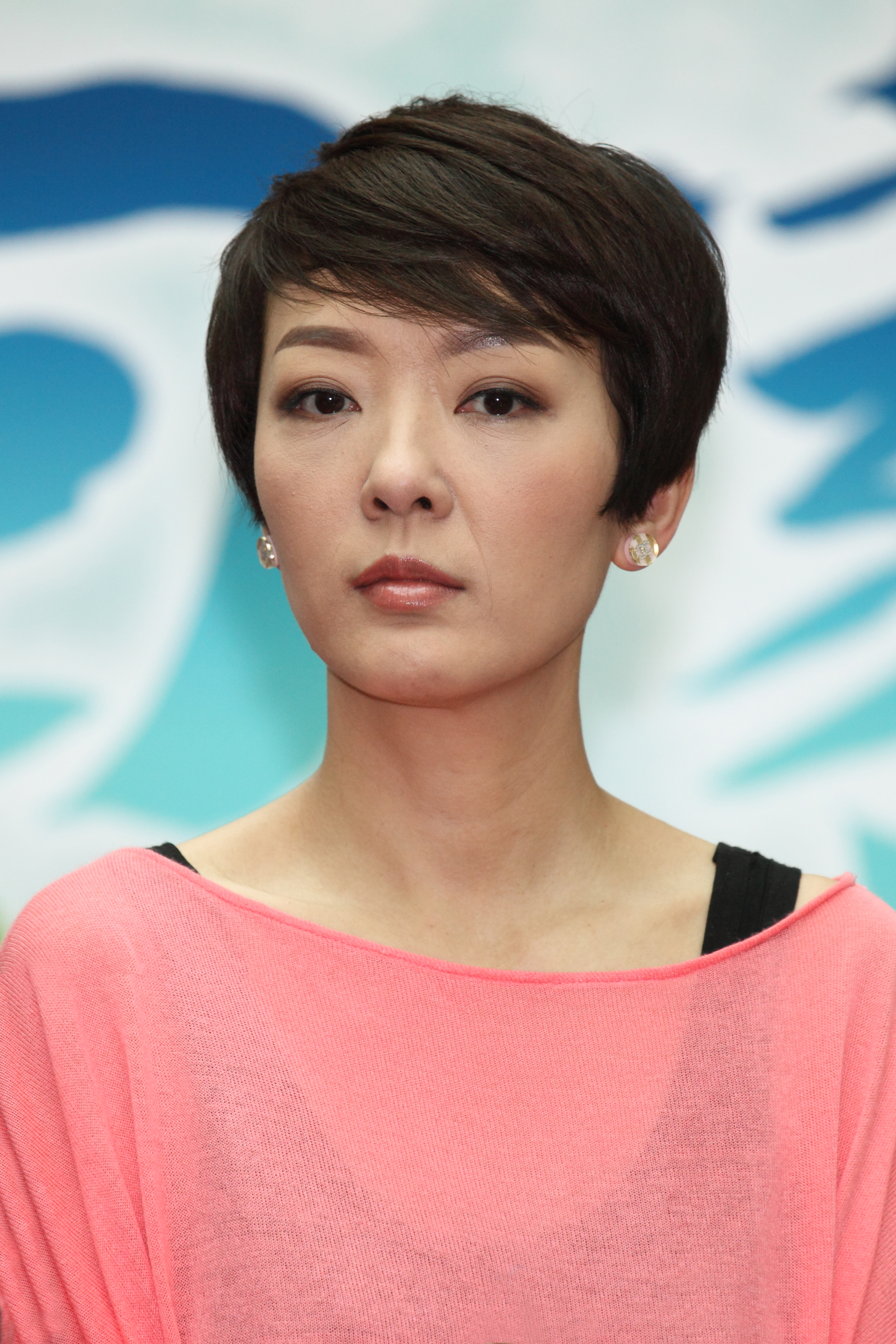
- Kwok at the premier of Come Home Love
- Born: 25 August 1968 (age 58); Hong Kong
- Other names: Kwok Siu-Wan, Florence Kwok Siu-Wan
- Occupations: Actress; voice acting

Chinese name
- Traditional Chinese: 郭少芸
Transcriptions
Standard Mandarin
- Hanyu Pinyin: Guō Shǎoyún
Yue: Cantonese
- Jyutping: Gwok^{3} Siu^{2} Wan^{4}

Florence Kwok Siu-Wan (born 25 August 1968) is a Hong Kong film, television, and voice actress.

== Career ==
In 1992, Kwok was a participant in Miss Hong Kong Pageant.

Kwok's entertainment career began at TVB. Kwok was an actress for TVB for over 20 years, and appeared in many notable roles, such as Tracy Wong in Men in Pain, Yvonne Mok in Forensic Heroes, Lam Siu-Yan in Dicey Business, Tina Wong in Off Pedder, Angel Ma in Come Home Love and Violet Che in No Good Either Way.

== Filmography ==
=== Films ===
- 1992 Basic Impulse
- 1992 The Thief of Time
- 1994 Vengeance - as voice of Madam Wong
- 1994 Best of Best
- 1996 Moonlight Sonata - as Ying
- 1998 Love and Let Love! - as Jane
- 2000 Needing You... - as Kitty
- 2000 Miles Apart - as Pam
- 2007 Mad Detective - voice of May Cheung
- 2009 Vengeance - voice of Insp. Wong

=== Television dramas ===
- Gentle Reflections (1994)
- Plain Love (1995)
- A Kindred Spirit (1995)
- Show Time Blues (1997)
- Time Before Time (1997)
- Justice Sung (1997)
- Dark Tales II (1998)
- As Sure As Fate (1998)
- Feminine Masculinity (1999)
- A Matter of Business (1999)
- Justice Sung II (1999)
- Ultra Protection (1999)
- At the Threshold of an Era (1999)
- Ups and Downs (2000)
- When Dreams Come True (2000)
- The Legend of Lady Yang (2000)
- The Legendary Four Aces (2000)
- Colourful Life (2001)
- Seven Sisters (2001)
- Woman on the Run (2005)
- 2 Become 1 (2006)
- The Dance of Passion (2006)
- Men in Pain (2006)
- Forensic Heroes (2006)
- Dicey Business (2006)
- Best Selling Secrets (2007)
- On the First Beat (2007)
- The Ultimate Crime Fighter (2007)
- The Gem of Life (2008)
- Forensic Heroes II (2008)
- Off Pedder (2008-2010)
- Wax and Wane (2011)
- Forensic Heroes III (2011)
- Come Home Love (2012–2015)
- Let It Be Love (2012)
- Gloves Come Off (2012)
- No Good Either Way (2012)
- King Maker (2012)
- Law dis-Order (2016)
- Come Home Love: Dinner at 8 (2016)
- Another Era (2018)
- The Dripping Sauce (2020)
- Ratman to the Rescue (2020)
- Kids' Lives Matter (2021)
- 父離子風暴 (Pre-production)
