= List of TVB series (2009) =

This is a list of series released by TVB in 2009.

== Top ten drama series in ratings ==
The following is a list of TVB's top serial dramas in 2009 by average ratings. The list includes premiere week and final week ratings, as well as the average overall count of live Hong Kong viewers (in millions).

Highest-rating drama series of 2009
Rank	English title	Chinese title	Average	Peak	Premiere week	Final week	HK viewers (millions)
1	Beyond the Realm of Conscience	宮心計	35	50	33	35	2.22
2	Rosy Business	巾幗梟雄	33	47	28	39	2.09
3	Burning Flame III	烈火雄心3	33	38	33	34	2.09
4	You're Hired	絕代商驕	32	40	31	36	2.03
5	D.I.E. Again	古靈精探B	31	38	29	33	1.97
6	E.U.	學警狙擊	30	43	29	34	1.90
7	The Threshold of a Persona	ID精英	30	41	28	32	1.90
8	A Chip Off the Old Block	巴不得爸爸...	30	37	31	28	1.90
9	A Bride for a Ride	王老虎搶親	30	34	30	31	1.90
10	The Stew of Life	有營煮婦	30	38	30	32	1.90

== Awards ==
Category/Organization	14th Asian Television Awards 3 December 2009	2009 TVB Anniversary Awards 4 December 2009	StarHub TVB Awards 29 January 2010
Best Drama		Rosy Business	Moonlight Resonance (from 2008)
Best Actor		Wayne Lai; Rosy Business	Raymond Lam; Moonlight Resonance (from 2008)
Best Actress	Michelle Yim; Moonlight Resonance (from 2008)	Sheren Tang; Rosy Business	Charmaine Sheh; Forensic Heroes II (from 2008)
Best Supporting Actor		Michael Tse; E.U.	—N/a
Best Supporting Actress		Susan Tse; Rosy Business	—N/a
Most Improved Actor		Ngo Ka-nin; Rosy Business, Sweetness in the Salt	—N/a
Most Improved Actress		Aimee Chan; Off Pedder, E.U., Burning Flame III	—N/a

== First line series ==
These dramas air in Hong Kong from 8:00pm to 8:30pm, Monday to Friday on Jade.

Broadcast	English title (Chinese title)	Eps.	Cast and crew	Theme song(s)	Avg. rating	Genre	Notes	Official website
20 Oct 2008– 12 Feb 2010	Off Pedder 畢打自己人	337	Catherine Tsang, Lo Jan-ok (producers); Teresa Mo, Elaine Jin, Wayne Lai, Stephen Au, Ivan Ho, Aimee Chan, Joyce Cheng, Elvina Kong	Opening: "Serenade No. 13" (Mozart); Ending: "無人完美" (Joyce Cheng)	27	Sitcom	HD format	Official website

== Second line series ==
These dramas air in Hong Kong from 8:30pm to 9:30pm, Monday to Friday on Jade.

Broadcast	English title (Chinese title)	Eps.	Cast and crew	Theme song(s)	Avg. rating	Genre	Notes	Official website
8 Dec 2008– 2 Jan 2009	Pages of Treasures; Click入黃金屋	20	Mui Siu-ching (producer); Paul Chun, Wayne Lai, Eric Suen, Sonija Kwok, Shirley Yeung, Sharon Chan, Mary Hon, Vivien Yeo	"我的最愛" (Eric Suen)	26	Drama		Official website
5 Jan– 6 Mar	Royal Tramp 鹿鼎記	45	Zhang Jizhong (producer); Huang Xiaoming, Wallace Chung, Cherrie Ying	Opening: "中間人" (Leo Ku, Justin Lo); Ending: "始終會行運" (Leo Ku)	27	Costume drama, Comedy	HD format Overseas production (China)	Official website
9 Mar– 3 Apr	The Winter Melon Tale 大冬瓜	20	Poon Ka-tak (producer); Liu Kai-chi, Sunny Chan, Louisa So	"大冬瓜" (Don Li, Lai Lok-yi)	26	Costume drama, Fantasy		Official website
6 Apr– 1 May	Man in Charge 幕後大老爺	20	Lee Tim-shing (producer); Kenneth Ma, Kate Tsui, Leila Tong, Matthew Ko	"幕後人" (Kenneth Ma, Matthew Ko)	28	Costume drama	HD format Copyright notice: 2007.	Official website
4 May– 5 Jun	Just Love II 老婆大人II	25	Chong Wai-kin (producer); Jessica Hsuan, Sunny Chan, Benz Hui, Joyce Tang, Natalie Tong, Johnson Lee, Timothy Ip	"老婆大人" (Johnny Njo)	28	Drama	Copyright notice: 2008.	Official website
8 Jun– 10 Jul	Sweetness in the Salt 碧血鹽梟	25	Lee Tim-shing (producer); Steven Ma, Tavia Yeung, Raymond Wong, Kwok Fung, Halina Tam, Ngo Ka-nin, Joel Chan, Ram Chiang	"愛怎麼說" (Steven Ma, Tavia Yeung)	28	Costume drama	HD format Released overseas on January 5, 2009. Copyright notice: 2008.	Official website
13 Jul– 9 Aug	A Bride for a Ride 王老虎搶親	21	Poon Ka-tak (producer); Chin Ka Lok, Sammul Chan, Louisa So, Nancy Wu, Gigi Wong, Rain Lau, Joseph Lee, Mimi Chu	"合法搶親" (Chin Kar-lok, Sammul Chan, Wong Cho-lam)	30	Costume drama, Comedy	HD format	Official website
10 Aug– 5 Sep	You're Hired 絕代商驕	20	Nelson Cheung (producer); Dayo Wong, Charmaine Sheh, Theresa Lee, Benz Hui, Michael Tse, Power Chan, Mandy Cho	"冇問題?" (Dayo Wong)	32	Comedy drama	HD format	Official website
7 Sep– 18 Oct	The Stew of Life 有營煮婦	30	Louise Lee, Chung King-fai, Christine Ng, Fala Chen, Timmy Hung, Evergreen Mak, Johnson Lee	"絕配的一對" (Fala Chen)	30	Comedy drama		Official website
19 Oct– 29 Nov	Beyond the Realm of Conscience 宮心計	33	Mui Siu-ching (producer); Charmaine Sheh, Tavia Yeung, Moses Chan, Kevin Cheng, Susanna Kwan, Michelle Yim, Selena Li, Mary Hon, Susan Tse, Joseph Lee, Kara Hui, Ching Hor-wai	"攻心計" (Susanna Kwan); Insert: "風車" (Charmaine Sheh)	35	Costume drama	HD format 42nd Anniversary Drama	Official website
30 Nov– 27 Dec	A Chip Off the Old Block 巴不得爸爸	21	Poon Ka-tak (producer); Ron Ng, Sunny Chan, Myolie Wu, Shirley Yeung, David Chiang, Gigi Wong, Nancy Wu, Louis Yuen, Carlo Ng	"咪話唔就你" (Ron Ng, Myolie Wu)	30	Period drama, Comedy		Official website
28 Dec– 22 Jan 2010	A Watchdog's Tale 老友狗狗	20	Leung Choi-yuen (producer); Steven Ma, Linda Chung, Kent Cheng, Maggie Shiu, Raymond Wong Ho-yin, Natalie Tong	"老友狗狗" (Steven Ma, Linda Chung)	31	Comedy drama		Official website

== Third line series ==
These dramas air in Hong Kong from 9:30pm to 10:30pm, Monday to Friday on Jade.

Broadcast	English title (Chinese title)	Eps.	Cast and crew	Theme song(s)	Avg. rating	Genre	Notes	Official website
20 Oct 2008– 13 Feb	The Gem of Life 珠光寶氣	82	Jonathan Chik (producer); Gigi Lai, Ada Choi, Maggie Siu, Bowie Lam, Moses Chan, Louise Lee, David Chiang, Bosco Wong, Linda Chung, Wong He, Kenny Wong, Eddie Kwan, Chen Hung-lieh	"鑽禧" (Shirley Kwan); Insert: "無情有愛" (Linda Chung); Insert: "相戀兩個字" (Bowie Lam, Gigi Lai); Insert: "我還在等什麼" (Moses Chan)	28	Drama	HD format 41st Anniversary Drama	Official website
16 Feb– 27 Mar	E.U. 學警狙擊	30	Wong Wai-sing (producer); Ron Ng, Sammul Chan, Michael Miu, Kathy Chow, Michael Tse, Elanne Kong, King Kong, Dominic Lam	"黑白變奏" (Ron Ng, Michael Tse, Sammul Chan); Insert: "手掌印" (Elanne Kong); Insert: "無愧於心" (Kathy Chow)	30	Crime drama	HD format Copyright notice: 2008.	Official website
30 Mar– 24 Apr	The King of Snooker 桌球天王	20	Terry Tong (producer); Adam Cheng, Niki Chow, Patrick Tang, Joyce Tang, Derek Kok, Benz Hui, Halina Tam	"命運遊戲" (Adam Cheng); Insert: "相信童話" (Niki Chow, Patrick Tang)	27	Drama		Official website
27 Apr– 29 May	Rosy Business 巾幗梟雄	25	Lee Tim-shing (producer); Sheren Tang, Wayne Lai, Ron Ng, Elliot Ngok, Kiki Sheung, Susan Tse, Kara Hui, Nancy Wu, Suki Chui, Pierre Ngo	"紅蝴蝶" (Ron Ng)	33	Costume drama	HD format	Official website
1 Jun– 5 Jul	The Threshold of a Persona; ID精英	27	Marco Law (producer); Roger Kwok, Yoyo Mung, Patrick Tang, Raymond Cho, David Chiang, Toby Leung, Natalie Tong, Power Chan, Kenny Wong	"掩飾" (Roger Kwok, Patrick Tang)	30	Drama	Copyright notice: 2008.	Official website
6 Jul– 15 Aug	Burning Flame III 烈火雄心III	31	Amy Wong (producer); Wong He, Kevin Cheng, Bosco Wong, Myolie Wu, Aimee Chan	"有意" (Kevin Cheng, Myolie Wu)	33	Action drama	HD format	Official website
18 Aug– 19 Sep	D.I.E. Again 古靈精探B	24	Kwan Wing-chung (producer); Roger Kwok, Sonija Kwok, Nancy Wu, Edwin Siu, Derek Kok, Kwok Fung, Mimi Lo, Kitty Yuen	"追根究柢" (Roger Kwok)	31	Comedy drama, Fantasy mystery		Official website
21 Se– 16 Oct	In the Chamber of Bliss 蔡鍔與小鳳仙	20	Wong Wai-sing (producer); Damian Lau, Kathy Chow, Kenneth Ma, Dominic Lam, Toby Leung, Kristal Tin	"傷愛一生" (Kathy Chow)	29	Period drama		Official website
19 Oct– 13 Dec	Born Rich 富貴門	41	Chong Wai-kin (producer); Ray Lui, Gallen Lo Joe Ma, Anita Yuen, Kenix Kwok, Jaime Chik, Nancy Sit, Benz Hui, Lau Siu-ming, Kenneth Ma, Sharon Chan, Vincent Wong	"差一剎的地老天荒" (Gallen Lo); Insert: "兩生關" (Kay Tse)	30	Drama	HD format 42nd Anniversary Drama	Official website
14 Dec– 8 Jan 2010	The Beauty of the Game 美麗高解像	20	Tsui Yu-on (producer); Kate Tsui, Christine Ng, Raymond Cho, Sharon Chan, Lai Lok-yi, Kingdom Yuen, Wong Cho-lam, Mimi Lo	"愛無愧" (Denise Ho)	27	Drama		Official website

== Warehoused series ==
These dramas were released overseas and have not broadcast on the TVB Jade Channel.

English title (Chinese title)	Eps.	Cast and crew	Theme song(s)	Genre	Notes	Ref.
The Greatness of a Hero 盛世仁傑	20	Leung Choi-yuen (producer); Kent Cheng, Sunny Chan, Sonija Kwok, Bernice Liu, Wayne Lai, Lee Heung-kam, Rebecca Chan, Leila Tong	"定局" (Hins Cheung)	Historical fiction	Aired on TVB Jade; 2 – 27 Apr 2012. Copyright notice: 2008.	
A Great Way to Care 仁心解碼	20	Marco Law (producer); Alex Fong, Kate Tsui, Raymond Wong Ho-yin, Ram Chiang, Ben Wong	"荒島隔岸" (Juno Mak)	Medical drama	Aired on TVB Jade; 10 Jan – 5 Feb 2011	

== Weekend Dramas ==
=== Saturday Series ===
These dramas air in Hong Kong from 8:30pm to 9:30pm, on TVB.

Airing date	English title (Chinese title)	Number of episodes	Main cast	Theme song (T) Sub-theme song (ST)	HD format	Highest average point ratings	Genre	Notes	Official website
26 Sep- 24 Oct	ICAC Investigators 2009 廉政行動2009	5	Part 1: Bowie Lam, Jessica Hsuan, Crystal Tin, Vivien Yeo, Raymond Wong; Part 2: Sonjia Kwok, Yoyo Mung, Halina Tam, Raymond Cho; Part 3: Miriam Yeung, Pakho Chau, Kenny Wong; Part 4: Maggie Siu, Raymond Wong, Joe Cheung; Part 5: Andy Hui, Sammul Chan, Stephanie Cheng, Evergreen Mak, JJ Jia		Yes	24	Modern drama	Collaboration with TVB and ICAC Hong Kong	Official website
