= Ron Ng =

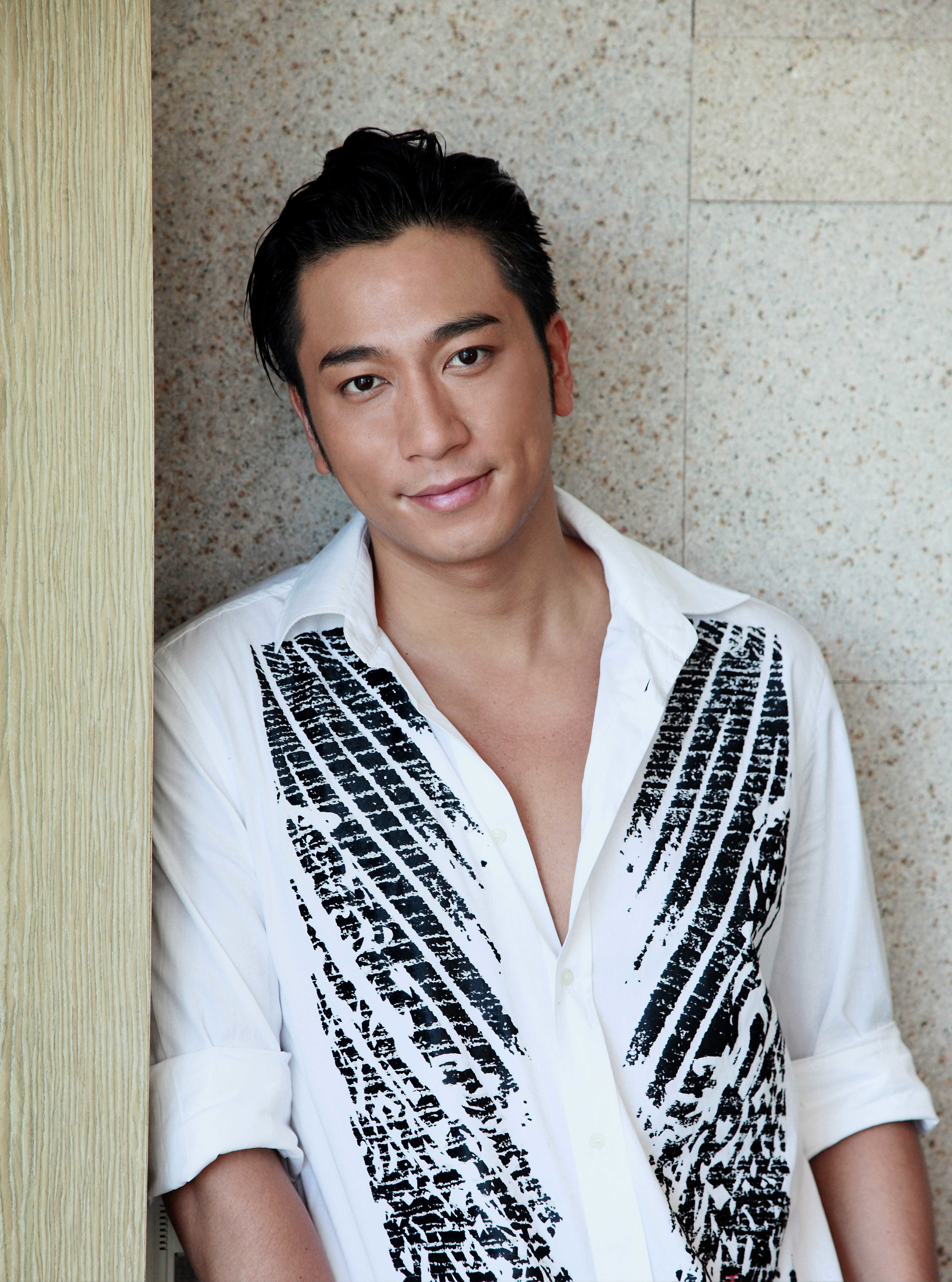
- Ng in 2013
- Born: Ng Siu Tong (吳兆棠); 2 September 1979 (age 47); British Hong Kong
- Occupations: Actor; singer; dancer
- Years active: 1998–present
- Awards: CTV Award for Best Actor; 2010 Pretty Maid; TVB Anniversary Awards – Most Improved Male Artiste; 2004 Twin of Brothers

Chinese name
- Traditional Chinese: 吳卓羲
- Simplified Chinese: 吴卓羲
Transcriptions
Standard Mandarin
- Hanyu Pinyin: Wú Zhuóxī
Yue: Cantonese
- Jyutping: Ng^{4} Coek^{3} Hei^{1}
- Musical career
- Genre: Cantopop
- Instruments: Vocals

Ron Ng Cheuk-hei (Chinese: 吳卓羲, born 2 September 1979) is a Hong Kong actor, singer, and former dancer. He first rose to popularity in the 2003 TVB drama Triumph in the Skies. He has since starred in several successful television series, most notably Twin of Brothers, The Academy series, and the Flying Tiger franchise. He is known for his various police roles in dramas series.

Ng has also appeared in the films Bleeding Mountain (2012), Shock Wave (2017), and Bodies at Rest (2019).

== Early life and career beginnings ==
Ng was born on 2 September 1979 in Hong Kong. He has an older sister. In 1999, he enrolled into Hong Kong broadcasting station TVB's dance training course. Under the recommendation of actor Louis Koo (for whom Ng appeared as a background dancer for), Ng joined TVB as an actor after graduating from the station's acting classes. He began his career with minor roles, such as in Burning Flame II.

== Career ==
=== As actor ===
In 2003, Ng was cast in a lead role in the historical costume drama Find the Light, starring alongside Damian Lau and Bosco Wong. That same year, Ng's breakthrough role came in the role of pilot trainee Issac Tong in the highly acclaimed Triumph in the Skies. Ng won TVB's Most Improved Actor Award in 2004 for his performance in the drama Twin of Brothers at the 37th TVB Anniversary Awards. Since then, Ng had been highly promoted at TVB, being cast as the male lead in most dramas. Ng was voted Super Idol by TVB Weekly and My Favorite TV character in Astro Wah Lai Toi TV Awards in 2005.

In 2005, he portrayed the strong-willed Chung Lap-Man in The Academy, a drama about police training. The drama was renewed for two more installments, On the First Beat (2007) and E.U. (2009), in which Ng reprised his role. Ng appeared in the movie Moments of Love in 2005, marking his film debut.

In 2007, Ng began filming television dramas in mainland China. He starred in Deep Affection Life (Chinese: 濃情一生), and in Pretty Maid (2008), for which he won the CTV Award for Best Actor.

In 2009 Ng starred in the time travelling comedy A Chip Off the Old Block. He portrayed Chiang Bit-ching in the critically acclaimed period drama Rosy Business, for which he was nominated for Best Supporting Actor at the 2009 TVB Anniversary Awards. In the same year, Ng made a cameo appearance in the E.U. spin-off movie Turning Point. In January 2010, he began filming for the drama Wax and Wane. Ng noted that he had turned down two mainland drama offers in order to film Wax and Wane, also stating that it was worth it to film alongside Roger Kwok, who stars as drama's main lead. In October 2010, he was cast in the drama L'Escargot, which aired in January 2012.

Ng starred in the 2011 comedy drama Yes, Sir. Sorry Sir!, starring alongside Moses Chan, Tavia Yeung, and Linda Chung. Ng portrayed Inspector Ching Man-lik in the drama. That year he also starred in police procedural drama Forensic Heroes III, which he filmed at the beginning of the year. In May 2011, Ng was cast as Chong Yau Kit, a paramilitary officer, in the action crime drama Ruse of Engagement (previously known as ATF), starring alongside Ruco Chan and Aimee Chan. The drama was not aired until 17 March 2014.

In 2013, Ng reprised his role as Issac Tong in Triumph in the Skies II. In November 2013, Ng began filming for comedy costume drama Lady Sour, starring opposite Myolie Wu. The drama aired in December 2014. In 2014, Ng starred in Black Heart White Soul as a police officer. In 2015, after 17 years at TVB, Ng decided to not renew his management contract with TVB, hoping to have more opportunities outside of Hong Kong. His last TVB drama was Lord of Shanghai, in which Ng portrays a cunning lawyer. At the 17th Huading Awards, Ng was awarded Audience's Favorite Artist (全國觀眾最喜愛的影視明星).

In 2017, Ng took on the role of Senior Inspector, Ko Ka-chun (高家俊), in Shaw Brother's action crime television drama Flying Tiger. He also took part in the action film Shock Wave and the action thriller Bodies at Rest. In 2018, Ng starred in the drama The Lady in the Cubicle (Chinese: 格子间女人). In 2019, Ng starred in Flying Tiger 2 as Senior Inspector Cheung Man-lung, who is part of the secret A Team. The drama marks the first time since 2003's Triumph in the Skies that Ng, Bosco Wong, and Kenneth Ma appeared in a drama together. Ng portrays Cheng Tian in the 2020 web television series White War.

Ng appeared in the 2020 film Shock Wave 2. Ng has also guest-starred in the hit series Line Walker: Bull Fight in episode 27. It was confirmed that Ng will be filming for the third installment of Flying Tiger in July 2020. Flying Tiger 3 premiered in December 2021 on the Chinese streaming platform Youku.

=== Music ===
In 2005, Ng signed with BMA Music Records and released his first EP The Fast Pass in December. Its lead single "Don't Blame Her" 別怪她 is part of the soundtrack in the drama series Revolving Doors of Vengeance. Ng was awarded the Best Newcomer Silver Award at the Jade Solid Gold Awards in 2005. In January 2006, Ng released his first studio album Fast Forward and headlined a concert.

Ng has sung several theme songs for the television dramas he starred in, including "Red Butterfly" 紅蝴蝶 for Rosy Business in 2009.

On 22 May 2010, Ng, Bosco Wong, Kevin Cheng, and Moses Chan hosted a concert at Arena of Stars called "Men's Live in Genting" in Genting, Malaysia. In August 2016, Ng, along with Ruco Chan, Tavia Yeung, and Nancy Wu performed at Be Charmed 2 (雲頂綻放魅力2演唱會).

In 2022, Ng joined the cast of reality TV show Call Me by Fire as a contestant.

== Filmography ==
=== Film ===
English title	Chinese title	Year	Role	Notes
Moments of Love	擁抱每一刻花火	2005	Tank	
Turning Point	Laughing Gor之變節	2009	Police officer	cameo
72 Tenants of Prosperity	72家租客	2010	Vincent	cameo
I Love Hong Kong	我愛HK開心萬歲	2011	Sam Gor (youth)	cameo
Bleeding Mountain	凶間雪山	2012		
Shock Wave	拆彈專家	2017	Ben	
The Legend of Zu	蜀山降魔传	2018		
Bodies at Rest	沉默的證人	2019	Police officer	cameo
Shock Wave 2	拆彈專家2	2020	Lun Ting-pong	
Ladies Market	女人街, 再見了	2021	Cheuk Chi Ho	
Where the Wind Blows	風再起時	2022		

=== Television ===
English Title	Chinese title	Year	Role	Notes
Journey to the West II	西遊記(貳)	1998	Mahākāśyapa	
Virtues of Harmony	皆大歡喜	2001	Wong Pong-ngan	
Burning Flame II	烈火雄心II	2002	Wah	
Golden Faith	流金歲月	2002	Kwan Siu-chau	
Lofty Waters, Verdant Bow	雲海玉弓緣	2002	Chu Kam-chun	
Vigilante Force	智勇新警界	2003	Firecracker	
Aqua Heroes	戀愛自由式	2003	Chan Siu-on	
Find the Light	英雄·刀·少年	2003	Wong Ng	
Triumph in the Skies	衝上雲霄	2003	Issac Tong Yik-fung	Next Television Award for the Most Anticipating Actor
Twin of Brothers	大唐雙龍傳	2004	Tsui Chi-ling	TVB Anniversary Award for Most Improved Male Artiste; Astro Drama Award for My Favourite Character; Nominated — Astro Drama Award for My Favourite Actor (Top 5)
Sunshine Heartbeat	赤沙印記@四葉草.2	2004	Volleyball team member	Cameo
Lost in the Chamber of Love	西廂奇緣	2005	Cheung Kwan-shui	
The Academy	學警雄心	2005	Chung Lap-man	
Guts of Man	肝膽崑崙 / 蓋世孖寶	2005	Sheung Foon	
Revolving Doors of Vengeance	酒店風雲	2005	Wong Kai-kit	Astro Drama Award for My Favourite Character; Nominated — Astro Drama Award for My Favourite Actor (Top 5)
Men in Pain	男人之苦	2006	Hong Sai-hei (Hong-hei)	Nominated — TVB Anniversary Award for Best Actor (Top 20); Nominated — TVB Anniversary Award for My Favourite Male Character (Top 20)
The Brink of Law	突圍行動	2007	Leo Tung Yat-chun	Nominated — Astro Drama Award for My Favourite Theme Song (with Steven Ma)
War and Destiny	亂世佳人	2007	Tin Hau-yee	
The Academy II: On the First Beat	學警出更	2007	Chung Lap-man	Astro Drama Award for My Favourite Character; Nominated — TVB Anniversary Award for Best Actor (Top 20); Nominated — TVB Anniversary Award for My Favourite Male Character (Top 24); Nominated — Astro Drama Award for My Favourite Actor (Top 10)
The Drive of Life	歲月風雲	2007	Ngai Kai-keung	
ICAC Investigators 2007	廉政行動2007	2007	Episode 4: "Crossing the Border"	
Life and Death	生死諜戀	2008	Tang Wensheng	
The Four	少年四大名捕	2008	Cold Blood / Lang Ling-hei	TVB Anniversary Award for My Favourite Male Character (Top 10)
Chocolate Lovers	浓情一生	2008	Li Jingyun / Li Xunfeng	
The Academy III: E.U.	學警狙擊	2009	Chung Lap-man	
Rosy Business	巾幗梟雄	2009	Chiang Bit-ching	Nominated — TVB Anniversary Award for Best Supporting Actor (Top 15)
A Chip Off the Old Block	巴不得爸爸...	2009	Chor Chi	Nominated — TVB Anniversary Award for Best Actor (Top 15)
OL Supreme	女王辦公室	2010	Ling Siu-kei (Ah K)	Nominated — TVB Anniversary Award for Best Supporting Actor (Top 5)
Pretty Maid	大丫鬟	2010	Fang Shaoling	
Dropping By Cloud Nine	你們我們他們	2011	Jesse	
Yes, Sir. Sorry, Sir!	點解阿Sir係阿Sir	2011	Inspector Nick Ching Man-lik	
Wax and Wane	團圓	2011	Gary Yung Yi-hang	Nominated — TVB Anniversary Award for Best Actor (Top 15)
Forensic Heroes III	法證先鋒III	2011	SGT Lee Chin-fung (Wind)	My AOD Favourites Award for My Favourite Drama Character (1 of 15)
L'Escargot	抉宅男女	2012	Ting Koon-fung	My AOD Favourites Award for My Favourite Drama Character (1 of 15)
Happy Marshal	歡樂元帥	2012	Wu Gang	
Silver Spoon, Sterling Shackles	名媛望族	2012	Kam Muk-shui	
Season of Love	戀愛季節	2013	Ng Chun-Kai	
Triumph in the Skies II	衝上雲霄II	2013	Issac Tong Yik-Fung	
Ruse of Engagement	叛逃	2014	Alfred Chong Yau-kit	
Black Heart White Soul	忠奸人	2014	Cheung Lap-guen	
Lady Sour	醋娘子	2014	Kai Chun	
My Best Ex-Boyfriend	最佳前男友	2015	Yin Hao Ran	
Lord of Shanghai	梟雄	2015	Lai Siu-kwong	
Return of Happiness	幸福归来	2015	Han Ming	
Why Get Married	結婚為什麼	2016	Wang Luyi	
Flying Tiger	飛虎之潛行極戰	2018	Marcus Ko Ka-chun	
The Lady in Cubicle	格子间女人	2018	Ray Cheng Rui Min	
Flying Tiger II	飛虎之雷霆極戰	2019	Cheung Man-lung	
Line Walker: Bull Fight	使徒行者3	2020	Foot massage customer	Cameo in episode 27
Flying Tiger III	飛虎之壯志英雄	2021	Ko Chi-lok	
Mission Run	廉政狙擊·黑幕	2022	Cheuk Yee-fan / Cheung Yee-fan	
PTU	PTU機動部隊	Pre-production	Kwan Chi-hin	

=== Variety show ===
English title	Chinese title	Year	Notes
Call Me by Fire	披荊斬棘	2022	Season 2

== Discography ==
- "Fighter" (TVB series The Academy Theme) – Ron Ng, Sky, Zac Kao and Rico Kwok
- "King Kong" (TVB series Men in Pain Sub Theme) – Ron Ng
- "Love Test" (Radio drama 28th Floor Love Story Theme) – Ron Ng and Tavia Yeung
- "Wedding Dress/Marriage Garments" (TVB series Lost in the Chamber of Love Theme) – Ron Ng and Myolie Wu
- "Put Your Hands Up" (2006 World Cup Theme) – Ron Ng, Raymond Lam, Bosco Wong and Kevin Cheng
- "Sun's Hand" (Japanese cartoon Japanese Bread King Theme) – Ron Ng
- "Breakthrough" (TVB series The Brink of Law Theme) – Ron Ng and Steven Ma
- "Yue Kerng Yuet Yung" (2004 Olympics Theme) – Ron Ng, Raymond Lam, Bosco Wong, Sammul Chan, Lai Lok Yi, and Kenneth Ma
- "Ultimate Battle" (Japanese cartoon Pokémon Theme) – Ron Ng
- "Don't Blame Her" (TVB series Revolving Doors of Vengeance sub theme) – Ron Ng
- "Step Towards the Sky in Your Dreams" (TVB series On the First Beat theme) – Ron Ng, Kenny Kwan and Deep Ng
- "Storm" (TVB series The Four Theme Song) – Ron Ng, Raymond Lam, Sammul Chan, Kenneth Ma (2008)
- "Black and White Variation" (TVB Series E.U. Theme Song) – Ron Ng, Sammul Chan, Michael Tse (2009)
- "Red Butterfly" (TVB series Rosy Business Theme Song) – Ron Ng (2009)
- "A Thousand Lifetimes" (Korean dubbed Tai Chi Chasers/太極千字文 Theme) – Ron Ng (2009)
- "Don't Say That I Didn't Indulge You" (咪話唔就你) (A Chip Off the Old Block, opening theme) – Ron Ng and Myolie Wu (2009)
- "OL Supreme" (女王辦公室) Theme Song – Ron Ng, Champman To and Denise Ho (2010)
- "Reunion" (團圓) (Wax and Wane, opening/ending theme) – Ron Ng (2011)
- "春風化雨" ( Yes Sir Sorry Sir (點解阿Sir係阿Sir) Theme Song – Ron Ng and Moses Chan (2011)
- "Target" (目擊) (法證先鋒III Theme Song) – Ron Ng and Wayne Lai (2011)
- "A Tale of a Wounded City" (傷城記)(缺宅男女 Theme Song) – Ron Ng and Linda Chung (2012)
- "Sometimes" (TVB series Silver Spoon, Sterling Shackles ending theme) – Ron Ng (2012)
- "Although This World" (雖然這個世界) (Flying Tiger 飛虎之潛行極戰 Sub Theme) – Ron Ng and Bosco Wong (2018)

== Awards and nominations ==
2003

- Metro ShowBiz TV Awardsb – Most Popular Male Actor
- Yahoo Popularity Awards – Most Searched Rising-Popularity Artiste
- Shanghai TV Festival – Most Potential Actor

2004

- Next Television Award – The Most "Bright Future" Male Actor
- Next Television Award – The Most Outstanding Style New Actor
- The Most Healthy Appearance Award – Top Ten Healthiest Artiste
- The Most Healthy Appearance Award – Armani Active Award
- Guardian's Number One Most Healthy Award – Charming Award
- TVB Anniversary Awards (2004) – Most Improved Actor

2005

- Next Television Award' – Top Ten Artiste Number 10
- TVB Weekly Magazine Most Popular Idol Award – Most Popular Idol (Male)
- TVB Weekly Magazine Most Popular Idol Award – Most Popular Ancient Times Character Award (Male)
- Jade Solid Gold Second round – Newcomer Award
- Yahoo! Most Searched Artistes Award – Yahoo! Most Searched Television Male Artiste
- Metroshowbiz Hit Awards – Hit Awards 2005 Karaoke Song
- 2005 Children's Song Awards – Top Ten Children's Songs
- 2005 Jade Solid Gold Top 10 Awards – The most popular new male artist

2006

- TVB Anniversary Awards (2006) – Best Actor (nominated)
- TVB Anniversary Awards (2006) – My Favorite Male Character (nominated)
- Astro Wah Lai Toi 2005 Television Awards Ceremony (Malaysia) – My Favorite Character Award
- Jade Solid Gold Top 10 Awards – Favorite Newcomer Male Award
- Hits Television Drama Awards – Popular Television Artiste
- Ultimate Song King (GuangZhou) – Most Potential Newcomer (Hong Kong)
- TV Series Themes Awards (Beijing) – Most Potential Artiste in Hong Kong Vicinity
- Lui Ting 881 Who Can Stand Against Me – Beautiful Voice Daddy
- Lui Ting 881 Who Can Stand Against Me – Most Potential Artiste
- Awards – Happy Shop Most Energetic Artiste
- TVB Children's Songs Award – Ten Best Songs for "Ultimate Battle"

2007

- TVB Anniversary Awards (2007) – Best Actor (nominated)
- TVB Anniversary Awards (2007) – My Favorite Male Character (nominated)
- TVB Anniversary Awards (2007) – Mainland Most Popular TVB Male Artist
- Astro Wah Lai Toi 2006 Television Awards Ceremony (Malaysia) – My Favorite Character Award
- Hong Kong's Future Big-Time Celebrity 2006 (GuangZhou) – Hong Kong Future Big-Time Celebrity
- Hong Kong's Future Big-Time Celebrity 2006 (GuangZhou) – Most Popular Artiste
- 9+2音樂先鋒榜 – Best Male Actor-Singer Award – Best Male Actor-Singer Award
- Metro ShowBiz TV Awards – Most Popular Male Actor
- Next Magazine TV Awards – Top Ten TV Artistes

2008

- TVB Anniversary Awards (2008) – My Favorite Male Character (nominated)
- TVB Anniversary Awards (2008) – Favourite Actor (in Mainland China) (nominated)
- TVB Anniversary Awards (2008) – TVB Long Term Service and Outstanding Staff Award
- Three Weekly – Favourite Character
- Fung Yan Award (China) – "Potential Star"
- Fung Yan Award (China) – Favourite Character
- Singapore Entertainment Awards – My Most Favourite Hong Kong Drama Series Actor
- QQ Entertainment Award – Favorite Hong Kong TV Actor
- Singapore Entertainment Awards – OMY Web Hottest Celeb
- Yahoo Popularity Awards

2009

- TVB Anniversary Awards (2009) – Best Supporting Actor (nominated)
- TVB Anniversary Awards (2009) – TVB.com Popular Artist (nominated)
- Next Magazine TV Artists Award – Top Ten TV Artistes
- China Fashion Carnival – Most Fashionable Artiste
- Sohu.com – 50 Most Beautiful Person on Earth
- HIM Magazine Awards – Cover Award
- Esquire Magazine Awards – Most Promising Star
- Children's Song Awards – Top Ten Children's Songs
- Yahoo! Buzz Award – Most Popular TV Male Artist

2011

- TVB Anniversary Awards – Best Actor (nominated)
