= Shirley Yeung =

Hong Kong actress (born 1978)

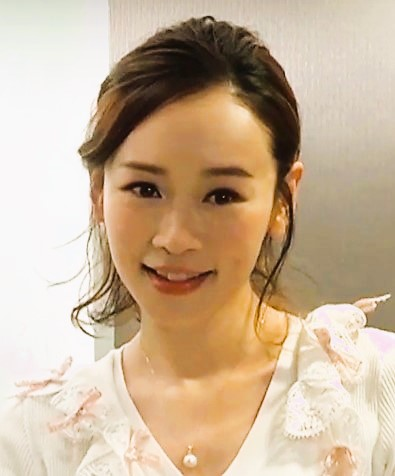
- Yeung in 2020
- Born: 7 August 1978 (age 48); British Hong Kong
- Education: Education University of Hong Kong
- Occupations: Actress; singer; model
- Awards: TVB Anniversary Awards – Most Improved Female Artiste; 2004 Angels of Mission; Best Supporting Actress; 2006 Always Ready

Chinese name
- Traditional Chinese: 楊思琦
- Simplified Chinese: 杨思琦
Transcriptions
Standard Mandarin
- Hanyu Pinyin: Yáng Sīqí
Yue: Cantonese
- Jyutping: yeung4 si1 kei4

Shirley Yeung Sze-ki (born 7 August 1978), is a Hong Kong actress who was under contract with TVB from 2001 to 2014. Yeung is a Hakka of Jiaoling descent.

== Career ==
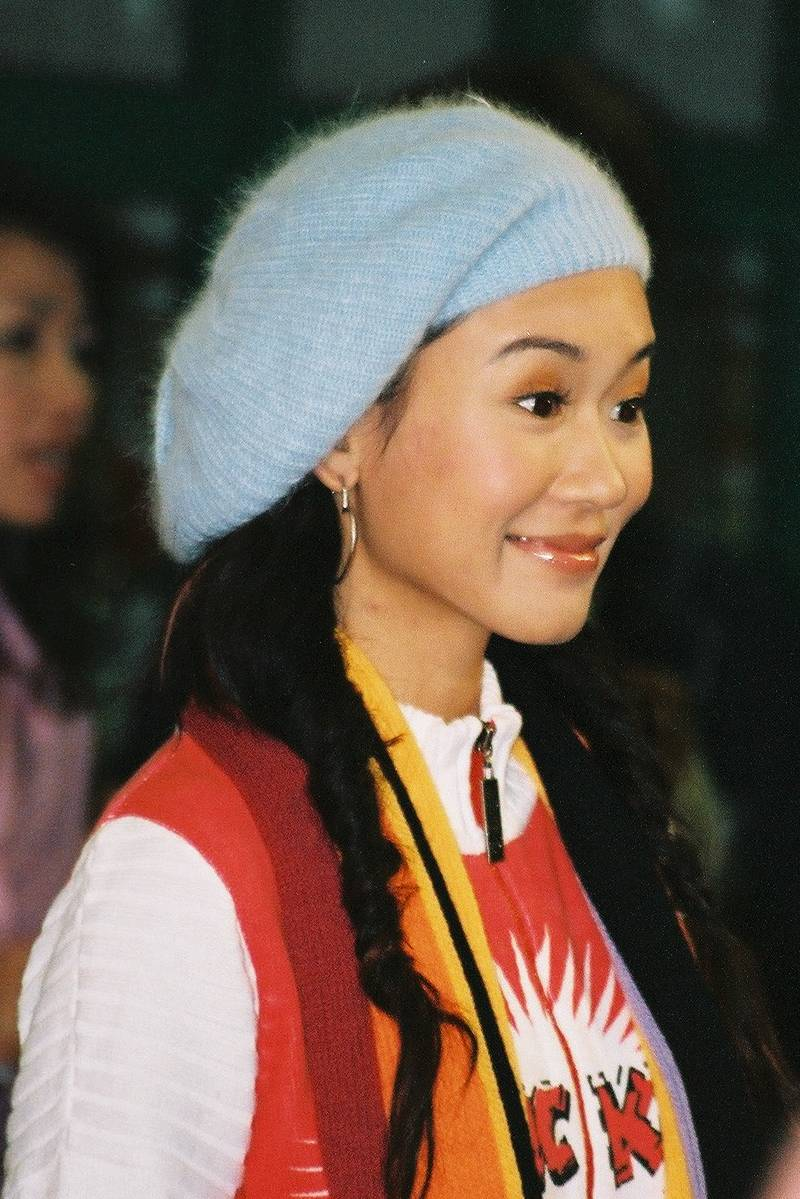
Yeung at a promotion at Wing Yip in London 2004 for Angels of Mission

She was the winner of the 2001 Miss Hong Kong Pageant contest. She had been the favourite among audiences since the very beginning of the competition. She won six awards and she currently holds the record for the most awards won by Miss Hong Kong. Yeung participated in Miss Chinese International 2002, where she made the top 5. Yeung began her career with TVB short afterwards. Her first drama was The Threat of Love 2, playing the third female lead, where she played different characters for each episode. She went on to play significant roles in dramas throughout the 2000s including Angels of Mission and Always Ready.

She left TVB in 2014 and expanded her career to Mainland China.

== Personal life ==
Shirley met actor Gregory Lee in 2002 on the set of Blade Heart. They dated until 2011 when Yeung announced their break-up at a public event. Shortly after the break-up, she dated Andy Ng which lasted 3 months. In 2012, her private life came under media scrutiny after she chose not to reveal the identity of her daughter's father to the public after Yeung announced on Weibo that she had given birth to daughter.

== Education ==
- Maryknoll Fathers' School
- Hong Kong Institute of Education

== Filmography ==
=== TV series ===
Year	Title	Role
2003	The Threat of Love 2 LovingYou我愛你2	BiBi/Shum Wing/Fun; Judy/Siu Hung/Amy; Cheung Lok-Sze/Yip Wing-Yan 沈穎、芬、Judy、小紅、Amy、張樂詩、葉穎恩
2003	In the Realm of Fancy 繾綣仙凡間	Pui Chui-Wan 裴翠雲
2003	Life Begins at Forty 花樣中年	Yuen Siu-Mui 阮小梅
2003	Find the Light 英雄·刀·少年	Princess Cheuk-Lan 卓蘭格格
2004	Blade Heart 血薦軒轅	Wong Yee 王怡
2004	Angels of Mission 無名天使3D	Bowie Tong Bo-Yee 唐寶兒
2004	Shine on you 青出於藍	Wing Lam Wing-Yan 林穎恩
2005	Hidden Treasures 翻新大少	Karen Pang Ka-Yan 彭家恩
2005	My Family 甜孫爺爺	Miki Mo Sze-Ting 毛思婷
2005	Always Ready 隨時候命	Nikki Chow Siu-Kuen 周小娟
2005	Bizarre Files 奇幻潮	Time Wizard 時間精靈
2006	The Bitter Bitten 人生馬戲團	Joey Chik Ho-Yee 席可兒
2006	Au Revoir Shanghai 上海傳奇	Nip Man-Wah 聶曼華
2006	The Price of Greed 千謊百記	Yan Yuet-Mui 殷悅妹
2007	The Brink of Law 突圍行動	Kelly Sung Ka-Yee 宋嘉兒
2007	Devil's Disciples 強劍	Szeto Sui-Ling 司徒水靈
2007	A Change of Destiny 天機算	Fok Yee-Na/Lee Chor-Kwan 霍伊娜/李楚君
2007	ICAC Investigators 2007 廉政行動2007	Rachel Kong Ka-Yue 江嘉裕
2008	The Silver Chamber of Sorrows 銀樓金粉	Chao-Kuk 秋菊
2008	Forensic Heroes II 法證先鋒II	Sharon Kwok Hiu-Lam 郭曉琳
2008	Moonlight Resonance 溏心風暴之家好月圓	Chung Siu-Ho (young) 鍾笑荷
2008	Pages of Treasures; Click入黃金屋	Abbie Lui Yuen-Yee 雷婉儀
2009	A Chip Off the Old Block 巴不得爸爸	Ching Lan-Fan 程蘭芬
2010	A Fistful of Stances 鐵馬尋橋	Ku Man-Kuen 顧文娟
2010	The Comeback Clan 翻叮一族	Justina Lei Yung-Shan 利蓉珊
2014	ICAC Investigators 2014 廉政行動2014	Jo Jo Yeung
2014	All That Is Bitter Is Sweet 大藥坊	Fung Yuk-Kan 馮玉琴
2015	IPCC Files 2015	
2017	Psycho Detective	

=== Films ===
- Kung Fung Mahjong 3 (2007)
- Black Comedy (2014)
- The Bat Night (2014)
- Adieu (2018)
- Top Female Force (2019)

=== Hosting ===
Year	Title	Co-host
2008	Tips for Home Decoration	Chin Kar-lok
2008	Living Up	Maggie Cheung Ho-Yee, Suki Chui, Candy Cheung
2010	Go! EXPO	Liu Xuan, Lily Ho
2011	Travelling With Koyo	Alan Wan, Ria Tong
2011	Where Feng Meets Shui	Tracy Ip

== Discography ==
=== Soundtrack appearances ===
- The Bitter Bitten OST – "Only Need You" (只需與你)

Awards and achievements
Preceded by Vivian Lau	Miss Hong Kong; 2001	Succeeded by Tiffany Lam
Preceded by Tavia Yeung for Vigilante Force	Most Improved Actress; 2004 for Angels of Mission	Succeeded by Niki Chow for The Gentle Crackdown
Preceded by Angela Tong for Life Made Simple	Best Supporting Actress; 2006 for Always Ready	Succeeded by Fala Chen for Steps
