= TVB Anniversary Award for Best Supporting Actress =

Hong Kong television award

- Awarded for: "Best Performance by an Actress in a Supporting Role"
- Country: Hong Kong
- Presented by: Television Broadcasts Limited (TVB)
- First award: 2005
- Currently held by: Venus Wong - The Queen of News 2 (2025)
- Website: http://birthday.tvb.com/

The TVB Anniversary Award for Best Actress in a Supporting Role is one of the TVB Anniversary Awards presented annually by Television Broadcasts Limited (TVB) to recognize an actress who has delivered an outstanding performance in Hong Kong television dramas throughout the designated year. This award was not introduced to the awards ceremony until 2005, eight years after its establishment.

== Winners and nominees ==
TVB nominates at least ten actors for the category each year. The following table lists only the actress who have made it to the top five nominations during the designated awards ceremony. Top nominations were not announced in 2013.

Table key
†	Indicates the winner

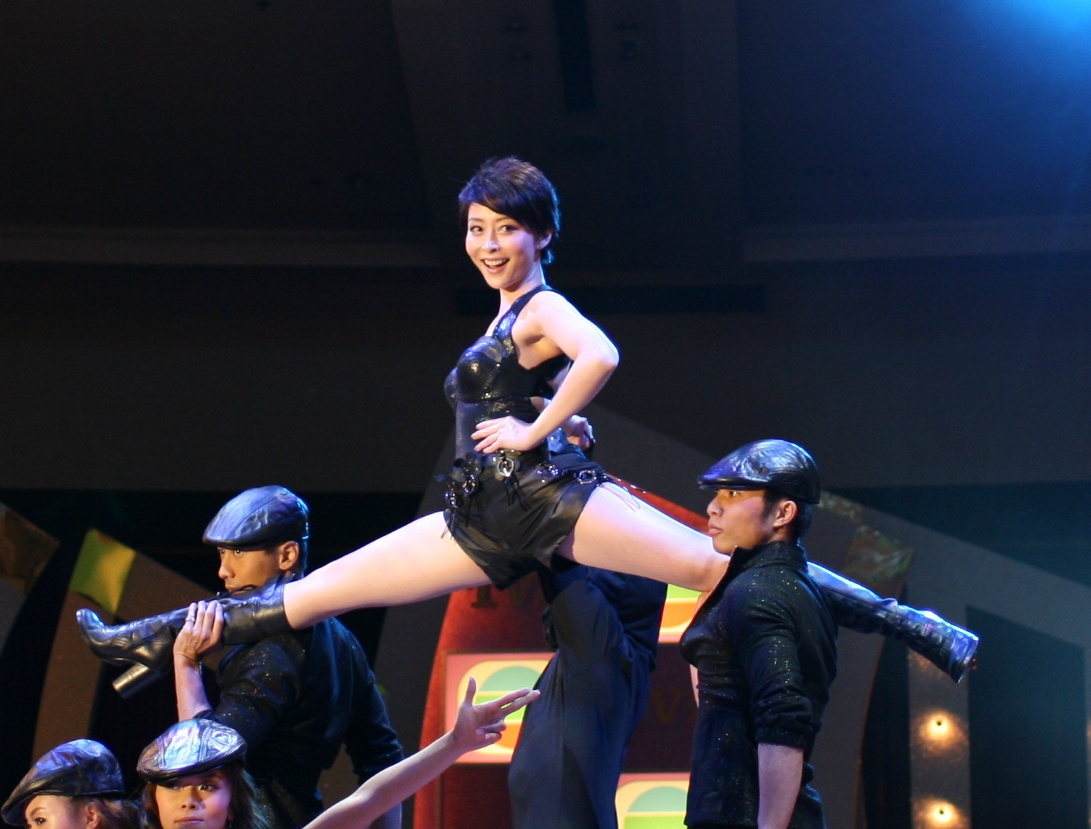
Angela Tong won in 2005 for her performance in Life Made Simple.

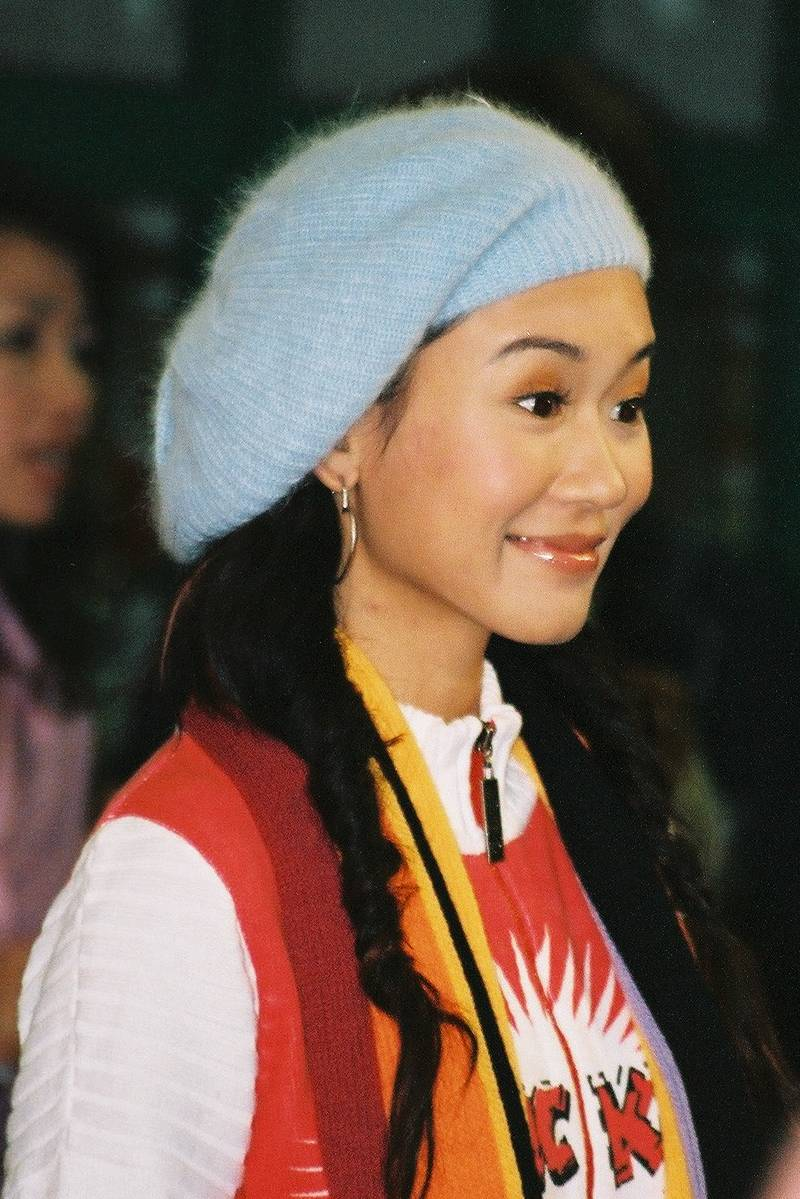
Shirley Yeung won in 2006 for her performance in Always Ready.

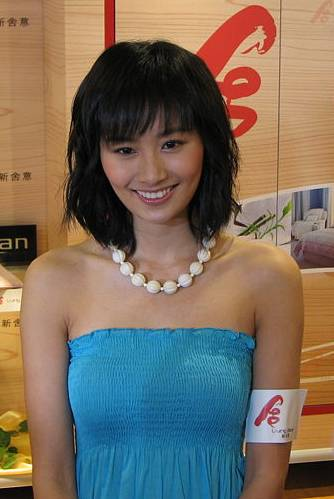
Fala Chen won in 2007 for her performance in Steps. She won again in 2010 for No Regrets.

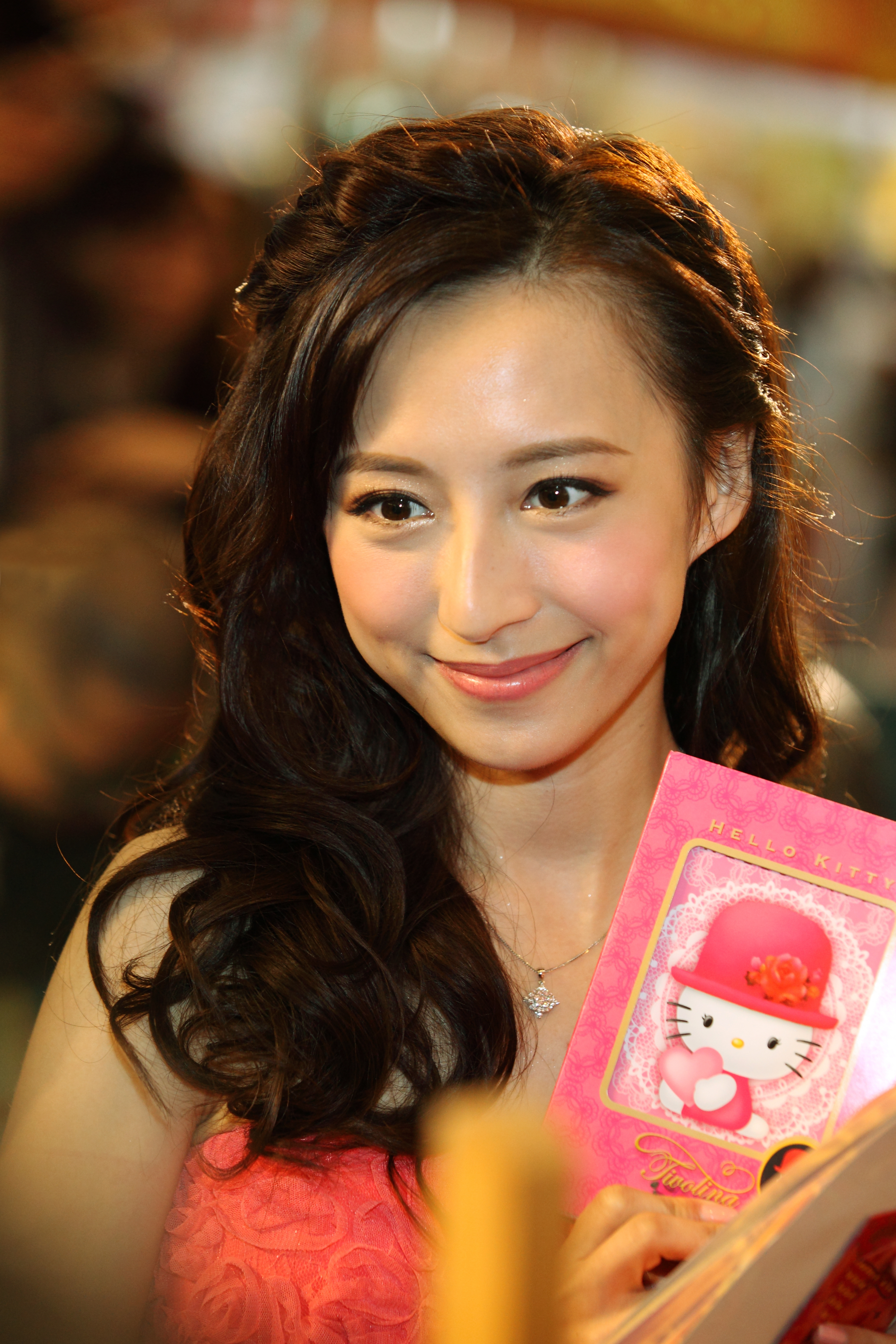
Katy Kung won in 2016 for her performance in Two Steps from Heaven.

=== 2000s ===
Year	Actress	Drama	Role(s)
2005 (9th)	Angela Tong †	Life Made Simple	Lee Siu-ho
2005 (9th)	Rebecca Chan	My Family	Wong Mei-sin
2005 (9th)	Michelle Yim	The Gentle Crackdown	Kam Ying (Flying Eagle)
2005 (9th)	Christine Ng	Wars of In-Laws	Lung Hau-hau
2005 (9th)	Kiki Sheung	The Charm Beneath	Lee Nga-sin
2006 (10th)	Shirley Yeung †	Always Ready	Nikki Chow
2006 (10th)	Kingdom Yuen	Welcome to the House	Ko Lai
2006 (10th)	Sharon Chan	Trimming Success	Choco Ko
2006 (10th)	Rebecca Chan	Men in Pain	Wong Tak-Lan
2006 (10th)	Kiki Sheung	Maidens' Vow	Tung Daai-Hei
2007 (11th)	Fala Chen †	Steps	Karmen Ching
2007 (11th)	Leila Tong	The Family Link	Shu Siu-Man
2007 (11th)	Florence Kwok	On the First Beat	WSGT Tong Jing-Nga
2007 (11th)	Gigi Wong	The Drive of Life	Hui Sum-Yan
2007 (11th)	Mary Hon	Fathers and Sons	Lee Daai-Choi
2008 (12th)	Tavia Yeung †	Moonlight Resonance	Suen Ho-Yuet
2008 (12th)	Nancy Wu	The Silver Chamber of Sorrows	Ha Fei-Fei
2008 (12th)	Fala Chen	Moonlight Resonance	Wing Kam
2008 (12th)	Kate Tsui	Moonlight Resonance	Camie Lo
2008 (12th)	Lee Heung-kam	Moonlight Resonance	Sheh Kwan-Lai
2009 (13th)	Susan Tse †	Rosy Business	Yan Fung-yee
2009 (13th)	Linda Chung	The Gem of Life	Elise Sung
2009 (13th)	Fala Chen	The Stew of Life	Charlie Ng
2009 (13th)	Susanna Kwan	Beyond the Realm of Conscience	Chung Suet-ha
2009 (13th)	Michelle Yim	Beyond the Realm of Conscience	Yuen Chiu-wan

=== 2010s ===
Year	Actress	Drama	Role(s)
2010 (14th)	Fala Chen †	No Regrets	Lau Ching
2010 (14th)	Kara Hui	A Fistful of Stances	Cheung Sheung-chu
2010 (14th)	Elena Kong	Beauty Knows No Pain	Angela "Angela Auntie" Hung
2010 (14th)	Susanna Kwan	Can't Buy Me Love	Ting Loi-hei
2010 (14th)	Nancy Wu	Gun Metal Grey	SGT Sze Hui
2011 (15th)	Sharon Chan †	Ghetto Justice	Ho Lai-ching
2011 (15th)	Aimee Chan	The Other Truth	Iris Wong
2011 (15th)	Natalie Tong	The Other Truth	Cecilia "Big C" Pun
2011 (15th)	Helen Ma	The Other Truth	Cheng Shuk-kuen
2011 (15th)	Nancy Wu	Forensic Heroes III	Eva Chow
2012 (16th)	Nancy Wu †	Gloves Come Off	Ting Yan-Chee
2012 (16th)	Mandy Wong	L'Escargot	Lau Siu-Lan
2013 (17th)	Elena Kong †	Triumph in the Skies II	Heather Fong
2014 (18th)	Josie Ho †	Tomorrow Is Another Day	Ting Ho-ho
2014 (18th)	Rosina Lam	Outbound Love	Ching Chin-chan
2014 (18th)	Sharon Chan	Line Walker	Yan Mok
2014 (18th)	Natalie Tong	All That Is Bitter Is Sweet	Hui Kwan-yeuk
2014 (18th)	Mandy Wong	Tiger Cubs II	So Man-keung
2015 (19th)	Elaine Yiu †	Captain of Destiny	Consort Yim
2015 (19th)	Stephanie Ho	Raising the Bar	Yiu Tsui-fa
2015 (19th)	Vivien Yeo	Ghost of Relativity	Law Lai-fa
2015 (19th)	Tracy Chu	The Fixer	Mak Ping-on
2015 (19th)	Jade Leung	Lord of Shanghai	Lau Mei-kum
2016 (20th)	Katy Kung †	Two Steps from Heaven	Carmen Ching
2016 (20th)	Joyce Tang	House of Spirits	Po Yan
2016 (20th)	Grace Wong	A Fist Within Four Walls	Fa Man
2017 (21st)	Rebecca Zhu †	A General, a Scholar, and a Eunuch	Catherine "Cat" Fong
2017 (21st)	Mandy Lam	Come Home Love: Lo and Behold	Linda Lung Lik-lin
2017 (21st)	Tracy Chu	Legal Mavericks	Yanice Tai
2017 (21st)	Elaine Yiu	The Unholy Alliance	Kate Wai
2017 (21st)	Sharon Chan	Heart and Greed	Venus Wong
2018 (22nd)	Mandy Lam †	Come Home Love: Lo and Behold	Linda Lung Lik-Lin
2018 (22nd)	Joyce Tang	Come Home Love: Lo and Behold	Hung Sheung-shin
2018 (22nd)	Angelina Lo	Who Wants A Baby?	Joyce Hong Lai-ching
2018 (22nd)	Jacqueline Wong	Deep in the Realm of Conscience	Kam Yuek-chin
2018 (22nd)	Kelly Cheung	Life on the Line	Man Fai
2019 (23rd)
2019 (23rd)	Candice Chiu †	Barrack O'Karma	Wong Man-Yi
2019 (23rd)	Gloria Tang	The Defected	Kay Kwong
2019 (23rd)	Samantha Ko	Barrack O'Karma	Chow Siu-Wai
2019 (23rd)	Mimi Kung	Finding Her Voice	Dai Gan Jing Yi / Dai Bao Sou
2019 (23rd)	Maggie Yu	Wonder Women	Ahn Sing Gong / Ahn Ye / Ahn Chung

=== 2020s ===
Year	Actress	Drama	Role(s)
2020 (24th)	Winki Lai †	Al Cappuccino	Chiang Chin-Ha
2020 (24th)	Yoyo Chen	Life After Death	Sabrina Chin Li-Woon
2020 (24th)	Elena Kong	Death By Zero	Lulu Jiu Suk-Haan
2020 (24th)	Angel Chiang	Al Cappuccino	Yiu Ching-Shu
2020 (24th)	Mimi Kung	Hong Kong Love Stories	Mok Siu-Ha
2021 (25th)	Yoyo Chen †	Plan “B”	Yip Fan
2021 (25th)	Lesley Chiang	Come Home Love: Lo and Behold	Liza
2021 (25th)	Mayanne Mak	AI Romantic	Kayee
2021 (25th)	Moon Lau	Take Two	Yeung Zi Shan
2021 (25th)	Regina Ho	Kids' Lives Matter	Dr. Esther Yu Chi-wa
2022 (26th)	Angel Chiang †	The War of Beauties	Chung Ka Kei (Katy)
2022 (26th)	Elaine Yiu	The Righteous Fists	Kam Fuk Mui
2022 (26th)	Rosita Kwok	Get On A Flat	Shang Ming
2022 (26th)	Yuki Law	Get On A Flat	Shang Yuen
2022 (26th)	Tiffany Lau	I've Got the Power	Ngo Chui Ping (Open)
2023 (27th)	Samantha Ko †	The Queen of News	Hui Tze Ching (Cathy)
2023 (27th)	Regina Ho	The Queen of News	Tsui Hiu Mei
2023 (27th)	Venus Wong	The Queen of News	Lau Yim (Carrie)
2023 (27th)	Kelly Fu	From Hong Kong to Beijing	Fan Nei
2023 (27th)	Tiffany Lau	The Invisibles	Ying Fung

== Records ==
Most wins

Wins	Actress
2	Fala Chen

Most top nominations

Nominations	Actress
5	Nancy Wu
4	Fala Chen
4	Elena Kong

Age superlatives

Record	Actor	TV drama	Age (in years)
Oldest winner	Susan Tse	Rosy Business	56
Oldest top nominee	Lee Heung-kam	Moonlight Resonance	76
Youngest winner	Fala Chen	Steps	25
Youngest top nominee	Fala Chen	Steps	25
