= Fala Chen =

Hong Kong actress (born 1982)

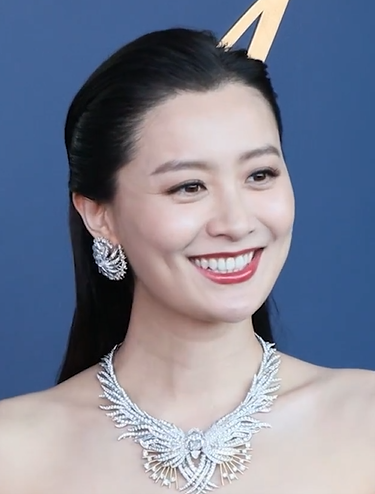
- Chen in June 2024
- Born: 24 February 1982 (age 44); Chengdu, Sichuan, China
- Citizenship: American; Chinese
- Education: Emory University (BA); Juilliard School (MFA)
- Occupations: Actress; singer
- Years active: 2005–present
- Spouses: Daniel Sit (m. 2008; div. 2013) Emmanuel Straschnov (m. 2019)
- Children: 2
- Awards: TVB Anniversary Awards – Best Supporting Actress; 2007 Steps; 2010 No Regrets Asian Television Awards – Best Supporting Actress; 2011 No Regrets

Chinese name
- Traditional Chinese: 陳法拉
- Simplified Chinese: 陈法拉
Transcriptions
Standard Mandarin
- Hanyu Pinyin: Chén Fǎlā
- IPA: [ʈʂʰə̌n fàlá]
Yue: Cantonese
- Jyutping: Can^{4} Faat^{3} Laai^{1}
- Musical career
- Label: Stars Shine International (2010–2012)
- Website: Official website

Fala Chen (simplified Chinese: 陈法拉; traditional Chinese: 陳法拉; born 24 February 1982) is a Hong Kong actress and singer. After winning 1st runner-up in the Miss Chinese International Pageant 2005, Chen made her debut as an actress in the Hong Kong cinema. She rose to prominence for her roles in the drama series Heart of Greed (2007) and its sequel Moonlight Resonance (2008). She won Best Supporting Actress twice at the TVB Anniversary Awards for her performances in the romantic series Steps (2007) and in the period drama series No Regrets (2010), and made her feature film debut in the crime thriller Turning Point (2009), earning a nomination for Best New Performer in the 29th Hong Kong Film Awards. She went on to take lead roles in the crime thriller series Lives of Omission (2011), the drama series Triumph in the Skies II, and the horror film Tales from the Dark 2 (both 2013).

Chen withdrew from the Hong Kong showbiz scene in 2014 to pursue a master's degree at Juilliard. After graduating, she made her United States debut in the HBO psychological thriller series The Undoing (2020). She gained international recognition for her role as Ying Li in the Marvel Cinematic Universe film Shang-Chi and the Legend of the Ten Rings (2021), and also appeared in the HBO comedy series Irma Vep (2022) and the monster film Godzilla x Kong: The New Empire (2024).

== Early life and education ==
Chen was born on 24 February 1982, and raised in Chengdu, Sichuan, China until the age of 14, when she immigrated to Atlanta, Georgia, United States with her parents. Graduating from high school within the top 10 of her cohort, she went on to pursue a course in Marketing and International Business in Emory University's Goizueta Business School in May 2005.

During her college-term-breaks, Chen took part in several pageants as a means to pay for her tuition fees. Amongst them was the Miss Chinese International Pageant 2005 hosted in Hong Kong by TVB where she represented New York City after winning Miss New York Chinese 2004. She won 1st runner-up, kicking off her career in entertainment.

In 2014, Chen began a 4-year Master of Fine Arts in Drama (MFA) Program at the Juilliard School in New York City. She graduated in May 2018.

== Career ==
=== Television ===
==== 2005–06: Entry to the TV scene ====
In 2005, Chen began her professional acting career when she signed an 8-year contract with TVB. She started out as a host on numerous variety shows on TVB's Mandarin channel TVB8, before making her acting debut in the TVB series Forensic Heroes guest starring as a murderess.

==== 2007–09: Breakthrough ====
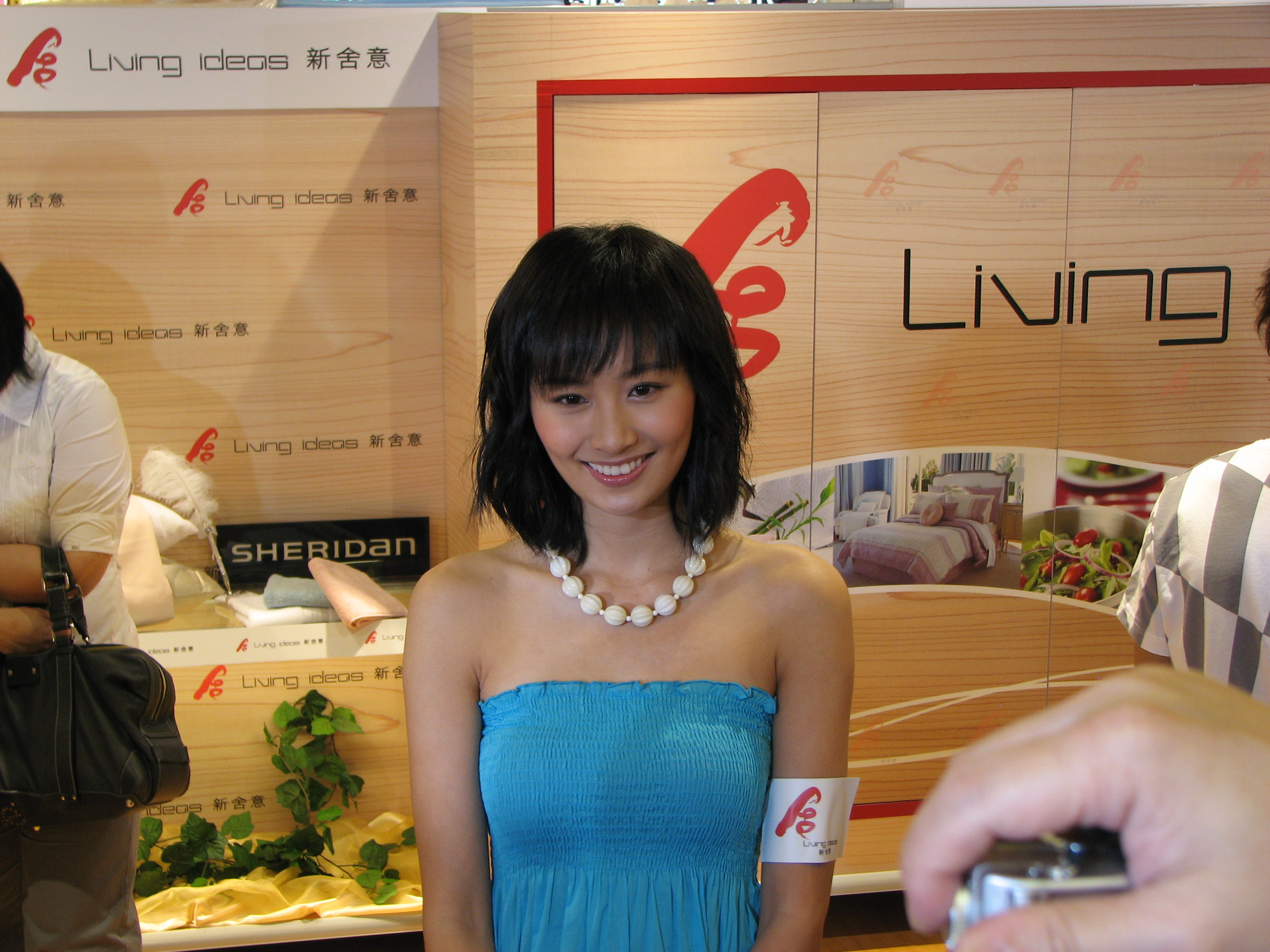
Chen at the HFC Park 'n Shop in Hong Kong (2007)

In 2007, after starring in Heart of Greed, The Family Link, and Steps, Chen won her first acting award in the Best Supporting Actress category for her role in Steps. Additionally, she was also nominated for "My Favorite Female Character" and "Most Improved Actress" categories for the same role. She also received a nomination in the "Most Improved Actress" category for her roles in Heart of Greed and The Family Link in 2007.

Chen's breakthrough came in 2008, when her notable work was for the character of Gam Wing Hing (a mute girl) in TVB series Moonlight Resonance, an indirect sequel to Heart of Greed, as she had to learn sign language for the role. The role landed her nominations in the "Best Supporting Actress" and "My Favorite Female Character" categories for the second year in a row.

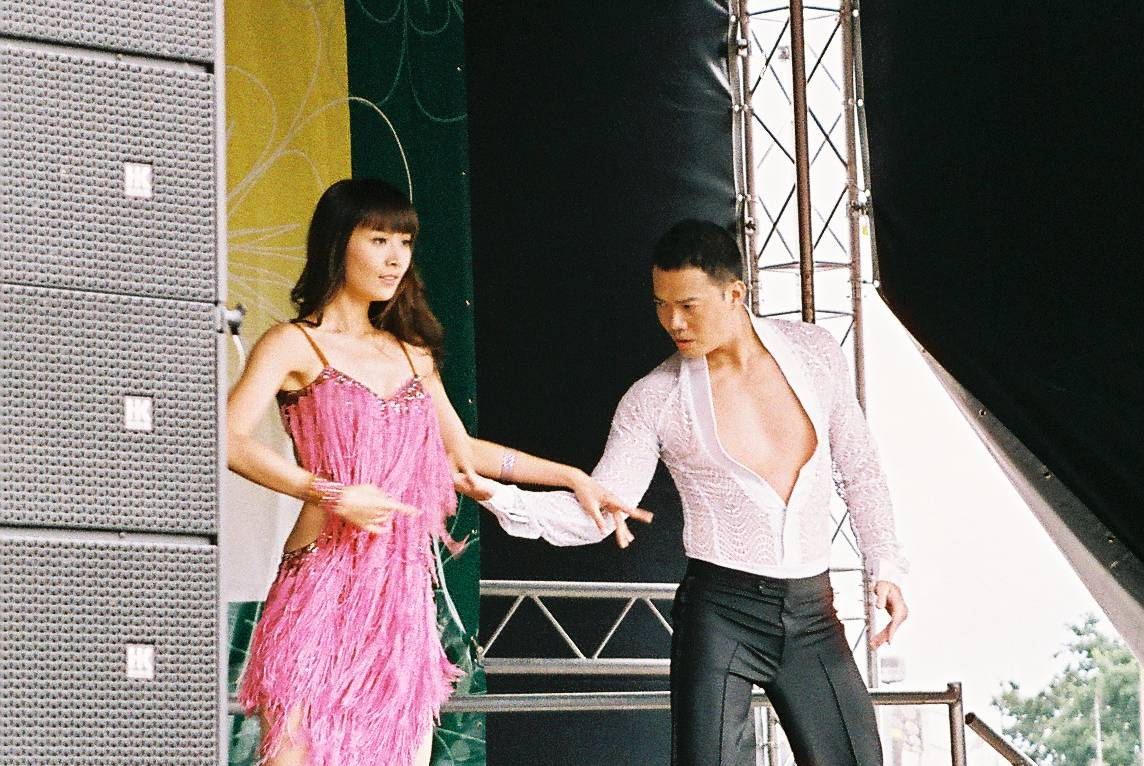
Chen dancing onstage with Michael Tse at London's Brent Cross shopping centre, during Happy Family Gala (2008)

In 2009, Chen was nominated again for the "Best Supporting Actress" and "My Favorite Female Character" categories for her role in The Stew of Life.

==== 2010–13: Leading-roles and entry to the music scene ====
In 2010, Chen was cast in TVB's grand production series No Regrets as second female lead, securing her position as one of Hong Kong's celebrated new actresses, alongside Tavia Yeung, Linda Chung, Myolie Wu, and Kate Tsui. The role won her the Best Supporting Actress Award at the TVB Anniversary Awards and Best Actress in a Supporting Role at the 16th Asian Television Awards.

She later took on roles as the first female lead in productions including Lives of Omission, Queens of Diamonds and Hearts, and Triumph in the Skies II. Lives of Omission (2011) was a distant sequel to the 2009 film Turning Point in which Chen had also acted in as the sister of a triad boss. Queens of Diamonds and Hearts (2012) allowed Chen to experiment with looking 'ugly' on screen as her character Chung Mo Yim, based on historical figure Zhongli Chun, was born with a prominent birth mark on her face. Chen played the role of Holiday Ho in Triumph in the Skies II —a free-spirited punk girl who aspires to fly—who became emotionally entangled between two male leads, Captain Samuel Tong played by Francis Ng and Captain Jayden Koo played by Julian Cheung. Chen also starred in 2013's Will Power alongside veteran actors Wayne Lai and Moses Chan where she played the role of Sam Yuet Kan, a junior barrister with a tough personality.

Her contract with TVB ended in mid 2013 and Chen became a self-managed artiste.

==== 2014: Entry into China's TV industry ====
Chen acted in her first mainland Chinese drama series, Sound of the Desert, where she played the role of Li Yan. It aired in 2014 and was based on the historical romance novel Ballad of the Desert by Tong Hua.

==== 2019: Entry into the American TV industry ====
Shortly after graduating from the Juilliard School, Chen was cast as Jolene in The Undoing alongside Nicole Kidman and Hugh Grant.

=== Film ===
==== 2009: Newcomer ====
In 2009, Chen took her chance at her first female lead role in the movie Turning Point as Michael Tse's girlfriend and Francis Ng's sister. Turning Point is a spin-off from the 2009 TVB crime drama E.U., where the character "Laughing Gor", played by Michael Tse, became a household name.

Chen was nominated for the Best New Performer category at the 29th Hong Kong Film Awards for her role in Turning Point.

==== 2010–13: Budding film actress ====
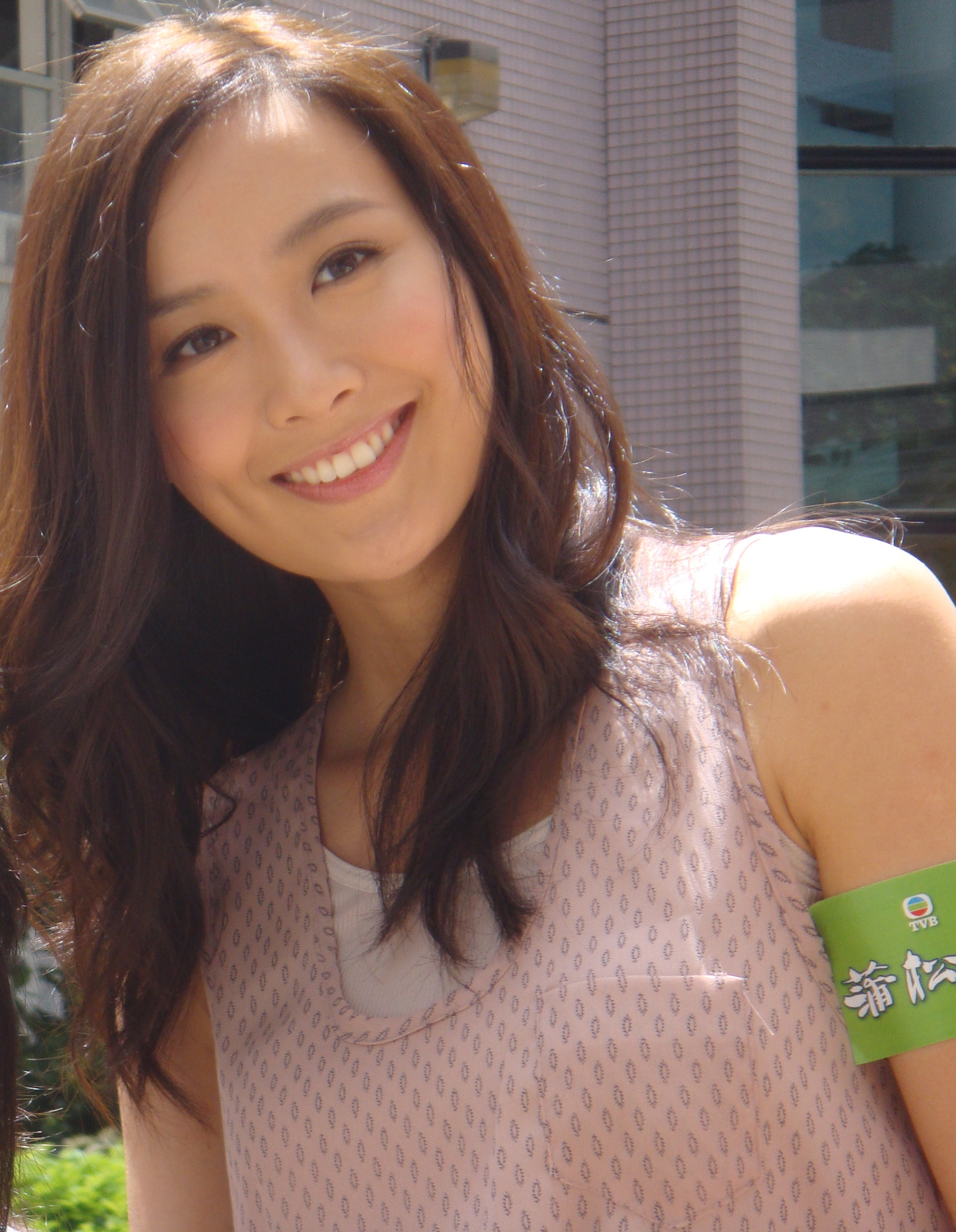
Chen in 2010

In 2010, Chen starred in two movies, Black Ransom and 72 Tenants of Prosperity. In Black Ransom, she acted as a superintendent, alongside internationally acclaimed Hong Kong actor and film producer, Simon Yam. 72 Tenants of Prosperity on the other hand, was a light-hearted Hong Kong comedy film directed by Eric Tsang, involving a star-studded cast of Hong Kong stars.

Chen took to the movie scene again in 2011, acting in the first installment of the heartwarming I Love Hong Kong film series, directed and produced by Eric Tsang. She too worked together with Eric Tsang again who produced and acted in The Fortune Buddies, another Hong Kong comedy film which also co-stars Louis Yuen, Wong Cho-lam and Johnson Lee who are better known as "Fuk Luk Sau" (福祿壽).

Tales from the Dark 2 (2013) was her first shot at the horror movie scene, and acting with her is Gordon Lam. Chen's story revolves around pillow demons, where her character Chow Jing Ee is seen to suffer from serious insomnia after her break-up with her boyfriend Yuen Hao Hong, played by Gordon Lam. Chen delivered a stellar performance, and was commended for the preparation work she did prior to filming, by staying a few nights alone in the cold apartment they filmed at to get into character and understand the loneliness and insomnia that the character suffered. The media had focused on the scene where Chen's character accidentally killed her boyfriend and tried to get rid of the corpse by taking off all of his garments and putting him into a vacuum bag. This is the first time that Gordon Lam has gone fully nude in a film. Owing to the explicit scenes, the movie has received a Category III rating.

Chen starred in the Cantonese version of Despicable Me 3 as the voice of Lucy Wilde, an Anti-Villain League agent, Gru's wife and the girls' adoptive mother. Doing voiceover for an animation film for the first time, Chen commented that it requires a lot of energy and precision to sync with the character's lip movement and it takes capturing the unique sounds and myriad of nuances in personality to bring the character to life.

==== 2015: Films pending release ====
Chen concluded filming for The Treasure, directed by Gordon Chan and Ronald Tsang.

==== 2021: American feature debut ====
Chen made her American film debut after being cast in the Marvel Cinematic Universe feature film Shang-Chi and the Legend of the Ten Rings as Ying Li. The movie is directed by Destin Daniel Cretton, and opened in theaters on 3 September 2021.

=== Theatre ===
==== 2013–16: Stage debut ====
Ever since Chen's contract with Television Broadcasts Limited (TVB) concluded in 2013, she went on to pursue a 4-year Master of Fine Arts in Drama (MFA) Program at Juilliard School with the passion and determination to better herself as a professional artiste. The MFA Program only accepts 8 to 10 students each year, and encompasses areas such as production, directing, playwriting, pedagogy, and current trends in American and World Theater.

Chen's debut on the theatre stage came in 2016 with Skylight - the premiere of Chinese adaptation of the 1995 British play written by David Hare that debuted in West End and Broadway. The play was scheduled to run for 24 shows at the Hong Kong Academy for Performing Arts, but due to overwhelming responses, 11 additional shows were added, making that a total of 35 shows running across 1 July 2016 to 14 August 2016. Starring alongside Dayo Wong and Terrance Lau, Skylight was a sold-out show within a few hours, and it received plenty of raving positive reviews including praises for Chen's performance as a theatre actor.

=== Music ===
Starting in 2009, Chen has been sporadically participating in the music scene, singing theme songs for The Stew of Life, Links to Temptation, and Queens of Diamonds and Hearts.

==== 2012: First album - Beautiful Life ====
In 2010, Chen signed under Stars Shine International and subsequently launched her first Canto-pop debut album, Beautiful Life, released on 31 July 2012. Some of the highlights from the album are "一半", "愛上鳥", and "Beautiful Life". Among these songs, "一半" was the first plugged song which garnered her awards in the Best Newcomer category across various music platforms such as 2012 TVB8 Golden Music Awards for the Bronze Award, 2012 Jade Solid Gold Best Ten Music Awards Presentation, and "2013 IFPI Hong Kong Top Sales Music Awards".

Within a week from the launch of her album, it had climbed up to first place on HMV's 'Asian Album Top Sales Chart'.

Her contract with Stars Shine International ended in 2012.

=== Endorsements ===
Chen was the spokesperson for Olay in mainland China, Hong Kong, and Taiwan. She was also Hong Kong Cancer Fund’s Pink Ambassador for the Pink Revolution Campaign, held every October to promote breast cancer awareness and raise funds to support free services for patients and their families.

== Personal life ==
In 2008, Chen married Hong Kong businessman (later actor) Daniel Sit. In 2011, she brought Sit to attend a church sermon delivered by friend and No Regrets costar Sheren Tang, hoping to expose him to the Christian faith. The couple divorced in 2013.

Chen acquired Hong Kong permanent residency in 2012.

In 2019, Chen married French entrepreneur Emmanuel Straschnov. In February 2021, she announced that she had given birth to a daughter. On 18 March 2024, Chen announced via Instagram that she had given birth to a son.

== Filmography ==
=== Television ===
Year	Title	Role	Notes/Ref.
2006	Forensic Heroes 《法政先鋒》	Yung Wai 容慧	Guest Star Ep.10
2007	The Ultimate Crime Fighter 《通天幹探》	Ada	Guest Star
2007	Heart of Greed 《溏心風暴》	Tong Chi Yan 唐至欣	Nominated — TVB Anniversary Award for Most Improved Female Artiste
2007	Best Selling Secrets 《同事三分親》	To Bing-Bing 杜冰冰	Guest Star ep. 28
2007	The Family Link 《師姐兵團》	Angela	Nominated — TVB Anniversary Award for Most Improved Female Artiste
2007	Steps 《舞動全城》	Ching Ka-Man (Karmen) 程嘉汶	Won — TVB Anniversary Award for Best Supporting Actress; Nominated — My Favourite Female Television Role (Top 20); Nominated — TVB Anniversary Award for Most Improved Female Artiste
2008	A Journey Called Life 《金石良緣》	Shing Mei-Sam (Vicky) 成美心	
2008	Catch Me Now 《原來愛上賊》	Hong Mei-Lei (Minnie) 康美莉	
2008	Moonlight Resonance 《溏心風暴之家好月圓》	Gam Wing Hing (Wing) 甘永慶	Nominated — TVB Anniversary Award for Best Supporting Actress; Nominated — My Favourite Female Television Role (Top 5)
2008	Colours Of Love 《森之愛情》	Nurse Chan 陳護士	Guest Star
2009	The Stew of Life 《有營煮婦》	Ng Choi-Nei (Charlie) 吳采妮	Nominated — TVB Anniversary Award for Best Supporting Actress; Nominated — My Favourite Female Television Role
2010	In the Eye of the Beholder 《秋香怒點唐伯虎》	Chu Ting-Yuk 朱婷玉	
2010	Ghost Writer 《蒲松齡》	Ling-Wu Siu-Tsui 令狐小翠	Nominated — TVB Anniversary Award for Best Actress
2010	Can't Buy Me Love 《公主嫁到》	Szeto Ngan-Ping 司徒銀屏	Nominated — My Favourite Female Television Role
2010	No Regrets 《巾幗梟雄之義海豪情》	Lau Ching 劉晴	Won — TVB Anniversary Award for Best Supporting Actress; Won — Asian Television Award for Best Actress in a Supporting Role
2010-2011	Links to Temptation 《誘情轉駁》	Hung Long-Kiu (Jojo) 熊朗蕎	
2011	Grace Under Fire 《女拳》	Kwai Fa 葵花	
2011	Lives of Omission 《潛行狙擊》	Chau Mong-ching (Jodie) 周望晴	Nominated — TVB Anniversary Award for Best Actress (Top 5); Nominated — My Favourite Female Television Role (Top 5); My Astro On Demand Awards for My Favorite Characters
2012	Queens of Diamonds and Hearts 《東西宮略》	Chung Mo-Yim 鍾無艷	Nominated — TVB Anniversary Award for Best Actress; Nominated — My Favourite Female Television Role
2013	Triumph in the Skies II 《衝上雲霄II》	Ho Nin-hei, Holiday 何年希	Nominated — TVB Anniversary Award for Best Actress (Top 5); Nominated — TVB Anniversary Award for Most Popular Female Character (Top 5)
2013	Will Power 《法外風雲》	Sam Yuet Kan 沈悦勤	
2014	Sound of the Desert 《风中奇缘》	Lee Yan 李妍	First Mainland Chinese Drama
2020	The Undoing	Jolene McCall	US Television Debut HBO Miniseries
2022	Irma Vep	Cynthia Keng	HBO Miniseries

=== Film ===
Year	Title	Role	Notes/Ref.
2009	Turning Point 《Laughing Gor之变节》	Karen and Jodie	Nominated - Hong Kong Film Award for Best New Performer
2010	Black Ransom 《撕票風雲》	Superintendent Koo	
2010	72 Tenants of Prosperity 《72家租客》	Xiu Tou Hung 小桃紅	
2011	I Love Hong Kong 《我愛HK 開心萬歲》	Lee Kei (Nikki) 李琪	
2011	The Fortune Buddies 《勁抽褔祿壽》	Sister Man 蚊姐	
2013	Tales from the Dark 2 《奇幻夜》	Chow Jing Ee	
2015	Secret Treasure		
2017	Despicable Me 3	Lucy Wilde	Cantonese dub
2021	Shang-Chi and the Legend of the Ten Rings	Ying Li Dweller-in-Darkness (voice)	
2024	Godzilla x Kong: The New Empire	Iwi Queen	
2024	Peg O' My Heart	Fiona	
2025	Lucky Lu	Si Yu	
2025	Ballad of a Small Player	Dao Ming	
2026	Bloodline	Director	Short film

=== Theatre ===
Year	Title	Role	Notes
2016	Skylight 《前度》	Kyra	Hong Kong Academy for Performing Arts

== Discography ==
=== Albums ===
Year	Album title	Album Information
2012	Beautiful Life	Release date: 31 July 2012; Label: Star Shine International; Debut Album

== Awards ==
=== 2002 ===
- Miss Asian America 2002

=== 2003 ===
- Miss Chinatown USA 2003 - 1st runner up (officially known as Miss Chinese Chamber of Commerce 2003)

=== 2004 ===
- Miss NY Chinese 2004 - Best MTV, Best Costume, and Miss Photogenic

=== 2005 ===
- Miss Chinese International 2005 - 1st runner up

=== 2007 ===
- TVB Anniversary Awards 2007 - Best Supporting Actress (Steps - Ching Ka-Man (Karmen))
- Next TV Awards 2007: Hekura Most Self-confident New Actress

=== 2008 ===
- Next TV Awards 2008: Hekura Acting Improvement Award
- Next TV Awards 2008: Most Promising Female Artist

=== 2009 ===
- Next TV Awards 2009: Hekura Stylish Female Artist
- StarHub TVB Awards 2009: My Favorite TVB Female Character (Moonlight Resonance - Gum Wing Hing)

=== 2010 ===
- TVB Anniversary Awards 2010 - Best Supporting Actress (No Regrets - Lau Ching)
- My AOD Malaysia My Favourite TVB Series Presentation 2010: Best Supporting Actress (No Regrets - Lau Ching)
- Next TV Awards: Top 10 Artist (No. 10)

=== 2011 ===
- 16th Asian Television Award - Best Actress in a Supporting Role (No Regrets - Lau Ching)
- StarHub TVB Awards 2011: My Favorite TVB Female Character (No Regrets - Lau Ching)
- Starhub TVB Awards 2011: Perfect Smile Award
- My AOD Malaysia My Favourite TVB Series Presentation 2011: My Favourite Top 15 Characters (Lives of Omission - Jodie)
- My AOD Malaysia My Favourite TVB Series Presentation 2011: My Favourite Onscreen Couple (Lives of Omission - Fala Chen and Michael Tse)
- Next TV Awards: Top 10 Artist (No. 9)

=== 2012 ===
- StarHub TVB Awards 2012: My Favorite TVB Female Character (Queens of Diamonds and Hearts - Chung Mo-Yim)
- 2012 TVB8 Golden Music Awards: Best Newcomer Award (Bronze)
- 2012 Jade Solid Gold Best Ten Music Awards Presentation: Newcomer Impact Award

=== 2013 ===
- TVB Star Awards Malaysia 2013: Favourite TVB Character (Triumph in the Skies 2 - Holiday)
- 2013 10th Huading Awards: Best Chinese Actress in TV Series (Queen of Diamonds and Hearts)
- 2013 IFPI Hong Kong Top Sales Music Awards: Best Newcomer Award

== See also ==
- Chinese people in New York City

Awards and achievements
TVB Anniversary Awards
Preceded by Shirley Yeung for Always Ready	Best Supporting Actress; 2007 for Steps	Succeeded by Tavia Yeung for Moonlight Resonance
Preceded by Susan Tse for Rosy Business	Best Supporting Actress; 2010 for No Regrets	Succeeded by Sharon Chan for Ghetto Justice
Miss Chinese International Pageant
Preceded by Mandy Cho	1st runner up 2005	Succeeded by Ginney Kanchanawat
