= Lily Ho =

Lily ho can refer to:

- Lily Ho (actress) (Chinese: 何莉莉) (born 1946), a former Chinese actress in Hong Kong
- Lily Ho Ngo Yee (何傲兒) (born 1988), a Chinese actress in Hong Kong
