= Miss Chinese International Pageant 2005 =

- Date: January 29, 2005
- Presenters: Lawrence Cheng; Stephen Au; Joe Ngai
- Entertainment: Eason Chan
- Venue: TVB City, Hong Kong
- Broadcaster: TVB
- Entrants: 22
- Placements: 5
- Winner: Leanne Li; Canada
- Congeniality: Jolene Chin; Malaysia

The 17th Miss Chinese International Pageant, Miss Chinese International Pageant 2005 was held on January 29, 2005 in Hong Kong. The pageant was organized and broadcast by TVB in Hong Kong. Miss Chinese International 2004 Linda Chung of Vancouver, British Columbia, Canada crowned Leanne Li as the new winner. Li was the fourth winner from Vancouver to win the crown and the second time a consecutive win occurred.

== Pageant information ==
The theme to this year's pageant is "Unlimited Beauty, Five Thousand Years of Enticement" 「美麗無限 五千年的心動」. The Masters of Ceremonies include Lawrence Cheng and Stephen Au, with Joe Ngai as the guest host during the interview round. Special performing guest was cantopop singer Eason Chan.

== Results ==
=== Placements ===
Placement	Contestant
Miss Chinese International 2005	Vancouver – Leanne Li 李亞男
1st Runner-Up	New York City – Fala Chen 陳法拉
2nd Runner-Up	Melbourne – Jessica Young 楊文琪
Top 5	San Francisco – Annie Chang 張聖瑩; Hong Kong – Kate Tsui 徐子珊

=== Special awards ===
- Miss Friendship: Jolene Chin 陳影雯 (Kuala Lumpur)
- Miss Gorgeous: Kate Tsui 徐子珊 (Hong Kong)

== Contestant list ==
No.	Contestant Name	Represented City	Represented Country	Age	Chinese Origin
1	Gaynor CHIN 陳慧玲	Sydney	Australia	23	Guangdong
2	Jessica YOUNG 楊文琪	Melbourne	Australia	19	Guangdong
3	Annie CHANG 張聖瑩	San Francisco	USA	25	Shanxi
4	Lisa WANG 王玥琪	Chicago	USA	22	Shanghai
5	Jolene CHIN 陳影雯	Kuala Lumpur	Malaysia	25	Guangdong
6	Linda TOMKO 林婉葒	Seattle	USA	20	Taiwan
7	Mary Grace SY 施佳兒	Manila	Philippines	21	Guangdong
8	Patricia HON 韓穎恩	Calgary	Canada	20	Chaozhou
9	Jasmine LIN 林詩惠	Singapore	Singapore	21	Fujian
10	Fala CHEN 陳法拉	New York City	USA	22	Zhejiang
11	Jeanette MA 馬展蔚	Auckland	New Zealand	19	Zhongshan
12	Lena MA 馬艷冰	Toronto	Canada	17	Jinan
13	Vivian ZHANG 張喆	Los Angeles	USA	22	Beijing
14	Kelly WANG 王斯婭	Brisbane	Australia	18	Shanghai
15	Leanne LI 李亞男	Vancouver	Canada	20	Shanghai
16	Kimberly CHIN 陳家嘉	Taipei	Chinese Taipei	22	Guangdong
17	Kate TSUI 徐子珊	Hong Kong	Hong Kong	25	Guangdong
18	Alicia AUGUSTO WONG 王雪紅	Lima	Peru	24	Taishan
19	Joyce DEJONG 何美馨	Amsterdam	The Netherlands	21	Guangdong
20	Cecilia LIU 劉佳	Montréal	Canada	21	Beijing
21	Elodie CHUNG 鍾美蓮	Tahiti	French Polynesia	21	Guangdong
22	Pradubduen SAWANKWAN 修懿芳	Bangkok	Thailand	19	Henan

== Crossovers ==
Contestants who previously competed or will be competing at other international beauty pageants:

Miss World

- 2009: Toronto, Canada: Lean Ma (Top 7)
