= Angels of Mission =

- Promo poster
- 無名天使3D
- Genre: Modern Action
- Starring: Charmaine Sheh; Sonija Kwok; Shirley Yeung; Patrick Tam; Timmy Hung
- Country of origin: Hong Kong
- Original language: Cantonese
- No. of episodes: 20

Production
- Running time: 45 minutes (approx.)

Original release
- Network: TVB
- Release: May 24 – June 18, 2004

Angels of Mission is a TVB series consisting of 20 episodes. It stars Charmaine Sheh, Sonija Kwok and Shirley Yeung as police who work for the CID. They try to balance their work and personal lives.

== Plot ==
Chief Inspector Sam Song (Sonija Kwok), Sergeant Yiu Lai Fa (Charmaine Sheh), and Bowie Tong (Shirley Yeung) are members of the Counter-Terrorist Unit (CTU). Together, they collaborate to solve cases against domestic and international terrorists. Major cases include:

- Lee Chin Jun (Ram Chiang) is a small cafe employee, who Bowie befriends, but resorts to anthrax when his world is turned upside down. Days after his wife joins him in Hong Kong, she is raped by Jun's boss and subsequently hit by a car. After his wife's death, he falls into a state of depression and, finding a tube of anthrax in his son's backpack placed there by the initial anthrax culprit, decides to use the anthrax to get revenge on his boss and the gangster responsible for his wife's death. Soon, even his son is taken away from him by social services because he had started physically abusing his son. On the day of their hearing, Jun takes his own son by force and Bowie is ordered by Sam to neutralize him on the street.
- Lee Tin Wah (Stephen Au) isn't a terrorist but he crosses paths with CTU due to his role as a private bodyguard-for-hire. His low opinions of cops causes a rift between him and CTU, especially Fa, who was tasked to protect the same politician as he was hired to protect. Despite differing personalities and methods, they're able to work together and keep the politician safe.
- Lin Hok Man (Shek Sau) is a businessman by day and illegal firearms trader by night. Previously, Sam had sent an undercover cop to investigate Lin Hok Man, leading to the cop's death. Though this upsets Sam greatly, her superiors order her to send in another undercover cop to finish the job and she reluctantly chooses Fa. Initially, they think Fa has successfully become Lin Hok Man's girlfriend but being a careful man, he figures out her identity and sends his bodyguard to kill Fa while he destroys all evidence of his shady deals. Lin Hok Man is arrested, tried, and sentenced to prison for breaking maritime and business law, knowing that will grant him a lighter verdict. However, after serving out his sentence, Lin Hok Man returns with a vengeance. He even hires Lee Tin Wah to be his new bodyguard and successfully bribes one of CTU's own to help him with his plan for revenge.

Despite the unending day-to-day at CTU, Sam, Fa, and Bowie find themselves caught up in love quarrels, love triangles, situationships, etc. However, in the end, their friendship withstands all trials and the three women continue to live their lives independent of any men.

== Cast ==
- Charmaine Sheh (佘詩曼) as Yiu Lai Fa 姚麗花
- Sonija Kwok (郭羡妮) as Song Lok Kei 宋樂琦 (Sam)
- Shirley Yeung (楊思琦) as Tong Bo Yee 唐寶兒 (Bowie)
- Patrick Tam (譚耀文) as Lee Gin Keung 李堅強（Dan）
- Timmy Hung (洪天明) as Si Yut Ming 史一鳴
- Bill Chan (石修) as Lin Hok Mun 連學文（Ben）
- Gilbert Lam (林韋辰) as Yeung Siu Fung 楊少峰（Joe）
- Stephen Au (歐錦棠) as Lee Tin Wah 李天華（Wallace）
- Claire Yiu (姚嘉妮) as Fong Siu Lan 方小嫻 (Susan)
- Lo Mang (羅莽) as Yiu Ying Biao 姚英彪 (Yiu Lai Fa's Father)
- Lok Dat Wah (駱達華) as Liu Sur Git 呂俊傑
- Catherine Chau (周家怡) as Jammy
- Kenny Wong (黃德斌) as Sum Tzi Hung 金子雄
- Ram Chiang (蔣志光) as Lee Chin Jun 李前進
- Lawrence Yan (甄志強) as Tom
- Law Lan (羅蘭) as 六姐

== See also ==
- 24
- Charlie's Angels
