= D.I.E. =

- Promo poster
- 古靈精探
- Genre: Comedy drama Paranormal; Crime Action adventure game
- Written by: Wong Kwok Fai
- Starring: Roger Kwok; Sonija Kwok; Kenneth Ma; Margie Tsang
- Opening theme: "花樣奇案" by Roger Kwok
- Country of origin: Hong Kong
- Original language: Cantonese
- No. of episodes: 25

Production
- Producer: Nelson Cheung
- Running time: 45 minutes (approx.)

Original release
- Network: TVB
- Release: March 11 – April 18, 2008

Related
- D.I.E. Again (2009)

D.I.E. or Death Investigation Extension (Traditional Chinese: 古靈精探) is a TVB modern comedy-action series broadcast in March 2008. It stars Roger Kwok, Sonija Kwok, Kenneth Ma & Margie Tsang.

TVB began filming D.I.E. Again (古靈精探B), the sequel, in November 2008.

== Synopsis ==
In the police force, "Death Investigation Extension" or "D.I.E." was established to accommodate the troublesome misfits who have been sent away by their supervisors. As everybody knows, members of the Extension are to investigate unsolved cold cases. Yue Chi-Long (Roger Kwok), who has cracked a large number of difficult cases by extrasensory means, is assigned to the D.I.E. because his superiors find him strange for falling asleep constantly on the job. New appointee Ying Jing-Jing (Sonija Kwok) is a good-looking girl but she takes an uncompromising stand over every case she deals with. Initially unaccepting of a division made of incompetent detectives, she is tricked into staying by her former supervisor, who claims that she was placed there to eventually replace the head and whip the team into shape. Chi-Long proves himself a capable detective but has a laidback attitude. The relationship between Jing-Jing and Chi-Long is deteriorating day by day, but also improving in a way...

Long lives with his elder sister, Yue Chi-Ching (Margie Tsang) and his Aunt Sa (Rain Lau), after his mother died and his father disappeared. While investigating an old case, Chi-Long gets to find his long-lost father Yue Tai-Hoi (Bryan Leung). While Chi-Ching is accepting, Chi-Long is angry at his father, going as far as arresting him when evidence hinted that Tai-Hoi may be related to a murder. Through close collaboration with Chi-Long, Jing-Jing has gradually developed affection for him. Her neglected but two-timing boyfriend Shing Ka-Tsun (Kenneth Ma) soon seals the decision for her, until Ka-Tsun's new girlfriend is murdered and he is forced to flee. When everything settles, Jing-Jing decides to start a relationship with Chi-Long, despite knowing that Ka-Tsun still loves her. However Chi-Long has started to try to avoid her without rhyme or reason, feeling confused about what is happening Jing-Jing decides to do some probing and is shocked to discover that Chi-Long has been dogged by a female ghost called Siu-Yi (Kitty Yuen), who had been preventing Long from developing romantic relationships. Later Siu-Yi tells Long that his life clashes with Jing's, and he will cause her to be killed if they are together. Long ignores this line until Jing gets hospitalised after an explosion. Chi-Long breaks up with Jing-Jing, leaving her heartbroken, until she is on a case. But Chi-Long and Jing-Jing know they are still in love with each other, leaving them in a painful and awkward situation...

== Cast ==
=== The Yue Family ===
Cast	Role	Description
Bryan Leung	Yue Dai-Hoi 于大海	Yue Chi-Long and Yue Chi-Ching's father. Kan Ji Mei's brother-in-law.
Margie Tsang (曾華倩)	Yue Chi-Ching 于子晴	Dating Agency Consultant; Yue Dai-Hoi's daughter. Yue Chi-Long's older sister. Cheung Ching-Yee's girlfriend.
Roger Kwok	Yue Chi-Long (Yue Sir) 于子朗	D.I.E. Investigator Sergeant; Yue Dai-Hoi's son. Yue Chi-Ching's younger brother. Ying Jing-Jing's boyfriend.
Rain Lau (劉玉翠)	Gaan Ji Mei (Sa Yee)(Anastasia) 簡緻美	Dating Agency Consultant. Yue Chi-Ching & Yue Chi Long's aunt, Yue Dai-Hoi's sister-in-law. Minnie's mom.

=== The Ying Family ===
Cast	Role	Description
Chun Wong (秦煌)	Ying Nam 刑 楠	Gum Sam Shun's son. Ng Suk Tuk's husband. Ying Jing Jing and Ying Pui Pui's father. Yue Dai-Hoi's childhood friend.
Lee Fung (李楓)	Ng Suk Tuk 吳淑德	Ying Nam's wife. Gam Sam Shun's daughter-in-law. Ying Jing Jing and Ying Pui Pui's mother.
Sonija Kwok	Ying Jing-Jing (Madam Ying) 刑晶晶	D.I.E. Investigator Sergeant; Ying Nam & Ng Suk Tuk's eldest daughter, Ying Pui Pui's older sister. Gum Sam Shun's granddaughter. Shing Ka-Tsun's ex-girlfriend. Yue Chi-Long's girlfriend.
Nancy Wu	Ying Pui Pui (Momoko) 邢珮珮	Matchmaker Consultant. Ying Jing Jing's younger sister. Ying Nam & Ng Suk Tuk's daughter. Gum Sam Shun's granddaughter.
Teresa Ha (夏萍)	Gum Sam Shun 金三順	Ying Nam's mother. Ng Suk Tuk's mother-in-law. Ying Jing Jing and Ying Pui Pui's grandmother.

=== D.I.E. (Death Investigation Extension) Unit ===
Cast	Role	Description
Joe Junior	Fai Gak-Sun (Fai Sir) 費格遜	Head of D.I.E. and Senior Inspector
Derek Kok	Cheung Ching-Yee 張正義	D.I.E. Investigator Senior Constable. Yue Chi-Ching's boyfriend. Bruce Lee Aficionado
Mimi Lo (羅敏莊)	Pang Mei Wan 彭美雲	D.I.E. Investigator Constable. Became Pierre's wife in the final episode.
(冼灝英)	Tse Siu Fung 謝小鳳	D.I.E. Investigator Senior Constable.

=== Other cast ===
Cast	Role	Description
Kenneth Ma	Shing Ka-Tsun (Hugo) 成家雋	C.I.D. Inspector; Ying Jing-Jing's ex-boyfriend.
Kitty Yuen (阮小儀)	Ng Siu-Yi 吳小宜	Spirit; Yue Chi-Long's admirer.
Akina Hong (康華)	Elize 何詠琛	Kwan Tak-Man's wife
Stefan Wong	Man Lung (Pierre) 文龍	Forensics Pathologist. Pang Mei Wan's husband.
Eric Li (李天翔)	Yan Heung Wing (Fred) 甄向榮	Criminal/Villain. Fuerdai; Cheung Ching-Yee's half-brother Ying Jing Jing (Madam Ying)'s nemesis
Suet Nay (雪妮)	Cheung Muk Lan 張沐蘭	Cheung Ching Yee's aunt. Extra actress
Manna Chan	So Sze Nga (Sylvia) 蘇詩雅	Cheung Ching Yee and Yan Heung Wing's mother

== Alternate ending ==
The original ending of the series has Roger Kwok's character, Yue Sir, dead as a result of the car accident. However, the TV audience voted for a happy ending. As a result, another ending was created by TVB.

The alternate ending is of "Mo lei tau" style of comedy.

1. Siu Yi transports members of the D.I.E. team to the moment before the car accident; the driver involved is Bobby Au-Yeung's character Chai Foon-Cheung from 2006's Dicey Business.
2. Members of D.I.E. try various ways to stop Chai Foon-Cheung, but to no avail.
3. At the last moment, Chai Foon Cheung stops the truck and says to the D.I.E. team that he feels moved by their sincerity to save Yue Sir from dying, thus asking them to arrest him for bootlegging movies. (However, it is not addressed regarding how Chai Foon-Cheung knows about the plot.)
4. Yue Sir and Madam Ying are in the hospital room, with Yue Sir holding their newborn son. Yue Sir comments why their son weighs 14 lb and a head full of hair. Siu Yi appears telling them that their curse has been taken care of, and the reason that their son is so big is because she fed him a bowl of rice before he was born.

Neither endings address the fate of criminal Dai Hao-Ying, who started the series as a Triad boss and ended up being a petty thief. (Though the cast lineup for D.I.E. Again will include him, thus his fate will be revealed at the start of the series.)

== Viewership ratings ==
	Week	Episode	Average Points	Peaking Points	References
1	March 17–21, 2008	1 — 5	32	34	
2	March 24–28, 2008	6 — 10	34	37	
3	March 31 - April 4, 2008	11 — 15	33	36	
4	April 7–11, 2008	16 — 20	34	38	
5	April 14–18, 2008	21 — 25	37	44	

== Awards and nominations ==
41st TVB Anniversary Awards (2008)

- Nominated - "Best Drama"
- Nominated - "Best Actor in a Leading Role" (Roger Kwok - Yu Chi-Long)
- Nominated - "Best Actress in a Leading Role" (Sonija Kwok - Ying Ching-Ching)
- Nominated - "My Favourite Male Character" (Roger Kwok - Yu Chi-Long)
- Nominated - "My Favourite Male Character" (Derek Kwok - Cheung Ching-Yee)
- Nominated - "My Favourite Female Character" (Kitty Yuen - Ng Siu-Yee)

== International Broadcast ==
- Malaysia - 8TV (Malaysia)
