= Queens of Diamonds and Hearts =

Hong Kong television series

- Promotional poster
- 東西宮略
- Genre: Costume drama Comedy; Fantasy
- Written by: Wong Kwok Fai
- Starring: Roger Kwok; Fala Chen; Sharon Chan; Louis Yuen; Ben Wong; Raymond Cho; Kitty Yuen; Koni Lui; Oscar Leung
- Opening theme: 缺陷美 by Fala Chen
- Country of origin: Hong Kong
- Original language: Cantonese
- No. of episodes: 25

Production
- Producer: Wong Wai Sing
- Production location: Hong Kong
- Camera setup: Multi camera
- Production company: TVB

Original release
- Network: TVB Jade
- Release: February 27 – April 4, 2012

Related
- Let It Be Love; The Greatness of a Hero

Queens of Diamonds and Hearts
- Traditional Chinese: 東西宮略
- Simplified Chinese: 东西宫略
Transcriptions
Standard Mandarin
- Hanyu Pinyin: Dōng Xī Gōng è

Queens of Diamonds and Hearts is a Hong Kong costume drama produced by TVB and starring Roger Kwok, Fala Chen, Sharon Chan and Louis Yuen. A blessing ceremony was held on 5 September 2011 at Tseung Kwan O TVB City's Shaolin Temple at 11:30PM where filming began.

The drama is based on the folk tale of Zhong Wu Yen a queen of the Warring States kingdom of Qi.

== Synopsis ==
This synopsis uses Cantonese romanisations

King Chai (Roger Kwok) is the inept ruler of Qi, a state surrounded by larger neighbours and beset with hidden internal and overt external threats. The guardian spirits of Qi come to the aid of Qi and King Chai by arranging for Chung Mo Yim (Fala Chen) to become the Queen of Qi. Chung Mo Yim is skilled in magic, martial arts and the use of strategems, however she has been born with a prominent birth mark on her face and King Chai finds her ugly. The opponents of Qi in turn arrange for King Chai to become infatuated with Ha Ying Chun (Sharon Chan). King Chai takes both Chung Mo Yim and Ha Ying Chun as co-wives, with Chung Mo Yim becoming Queen of the East Palace and Ha Ying Chun becoming Queen of the West Palace.

Although naive and kind hearted Ha Ying Chun is jinxed by Qi's enemies and all of King Chai's attempts to please her lead to disaster after disaster, problems that only Chung Mo Yim can defuse and fix. Although originally she only married King Chai out of duty to the people and nation of Qi, Chung Mo Yim comes to desire to be more than King Chai's troubleshooter and a wife in name only.

== Cast ==
This cast list uses Cantonese romanisations

=== Royal Family ===
Cast	Role	Description
Angelina Lo	Queen Dowager Shan 申太后	King Chai, Lord Shun Yeung Kwan, and Tin Wan's mother
Roger Kwok	King Suen of Chai 齊宣王	Then switched spirits with Yim
Fala Chen	Chung Mo Yim 鍾無艷	King Chai's wife, Queen of the East Palace; Then switched spirits with Chun and Suen
Sharon Chan	Ha Ying Chun 夏迎春	King Chai's wife Queen of the West Palace; Then switched spirits with Yim
Yoyo Chen	Tsui Kei 徐 姬	Lord Shun's wife
Ben Wong	Lord Shun Yeung Kwan 信陽君	Queen Dowager Shan's son
Bella Lam	Princess Tin Wan 田芸	Queen Dowager Shan's daughter

=== Other cast ===
Cast	Role	Description
Koni Lui	Chung Mo Wai 鍾無慧	Ngan Ying's girlfriend. Mo Yim's martial sister
Louis Yuen	Ngan Ying 晏英	Chung Mo Wai's boyfriend
Suet Nei	朱 氏	Ngan Ying and Ngan Kiu's grandmother
Oscar Leung (梁烈唯)	端木正	Princess Cheung's boyfriend
Raymond Cho	Keung Chik Yan 姜直仁	Ha Ying Chun's ex-boyfriend
Kitty Yuen Siu Yee	Chung Lai Chi 鍾离子	Chung Mo Yim and Chung Mo Wai's master
Lulu Kai (蓋世寶)	Chung Suen Chi 鍾巽子	Chung Lai Chi's Junior sister apprentice
Gigi Ho (何傲芝)	An Kiu 晏嬌	Married Keung Chik Yan (episode 25)
Wilson Tsui (艾威)	夏 桂	Ha Song Chau, Ha Ying Chun's father
Chan On Ying (陳安瑩)	柳 氏	Ha Song Ha, Ha Ying Chun's mother
Simon Lo (魯文傑)	Ha Song Chau 夏送秋	Ha Ying Chun's older brother
Dickson Lee (李家聲)	Yin Lai 嚴厲	Chiu Kei's brother-in-law
Jimmy Au (歐瑞偉)		

== Viewership ratings ==
Week	week of	episode	ratings	peak rating	references
1	February 27 - March 2, 2012	1 — 5	28	30	
2	March 5–9, 2012	6 — 10	28	—	
3	March 12–15, 2012	11 — 14	29	—	
4	March 20–23, 2012	15 — 18	29	—	
5	March 26–30, 2012	19 — 23	29	—	
5	April 4, 2012	24 — 25	36	40	
