= Suki Chui =

Hong Kong actress

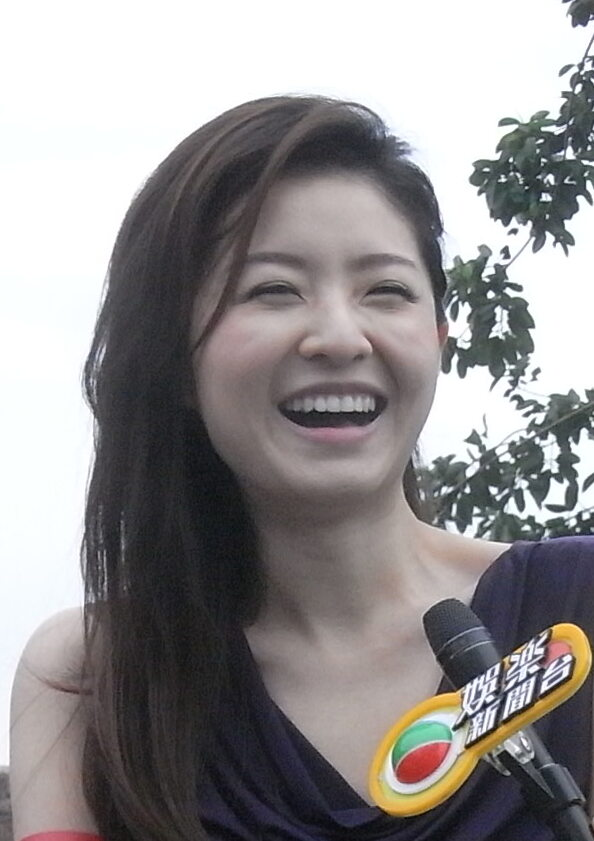
- Chui in 2012
- Born: 22 September 1984 (age 41); Hong Kong
- Occupations: Actress; model; host; businessperson
- Years active: 2006–2014
- Spouse: Kenny Wee
- Children: Vianna Wee; Renee Wee; Isabella Wee

Chinese name
- Traditional Chinese: 徐菁遙
- Simplified Chinese: 徐菁遙
Transcriptions
Standard Mandarin
- Hanyu Pinyin: Xú JīngYáo
Yue: Cantonese
- Jyutping: Ceoi^{4} Cing^{1} Jiu^{4}

Suki Chui Suk-Man (Chinese: 徐菁遙; former name Chinese: 徐淑敏; born 22 September 1984) is a Hong Kong actress, affiliated with TVB up to 8 January 2014. She participated in the Miss Hong Kong Pageant 2006 and was awarded with the Tourism Ambassador Award. She married Kenny Wee (Wong Ho 黃浩, whose father is from Kuching, Sarawak, Malaysia) on November 15, 2009.

== Filmography ==
=== Competitions ===
- Miss Hong Kong Pageant 2006

=== Television programmes ===
Year	Title
2006	Homeland Beauty
2007	Starry Kitchen
2007	More Than Words
2008	Living Up Sr. 5
2008	Recipes Why Not?
2008	Delicious Japan Sr. 2
2011	My Sweets

=== Dramas ===
Year	Title	Role
2007	The Green Grass of Home	Yoyo (江子菁)
2007	Word Twisters' Adventures	柳依依
2008	Wars of In-Laws II	Gloria
2008	The Seventh Day	Ella (許美娜)
2008	Catch Me Now	Jenny
2009	Rosy Business	丘敏
2011	A Great Way to Care	Gigi

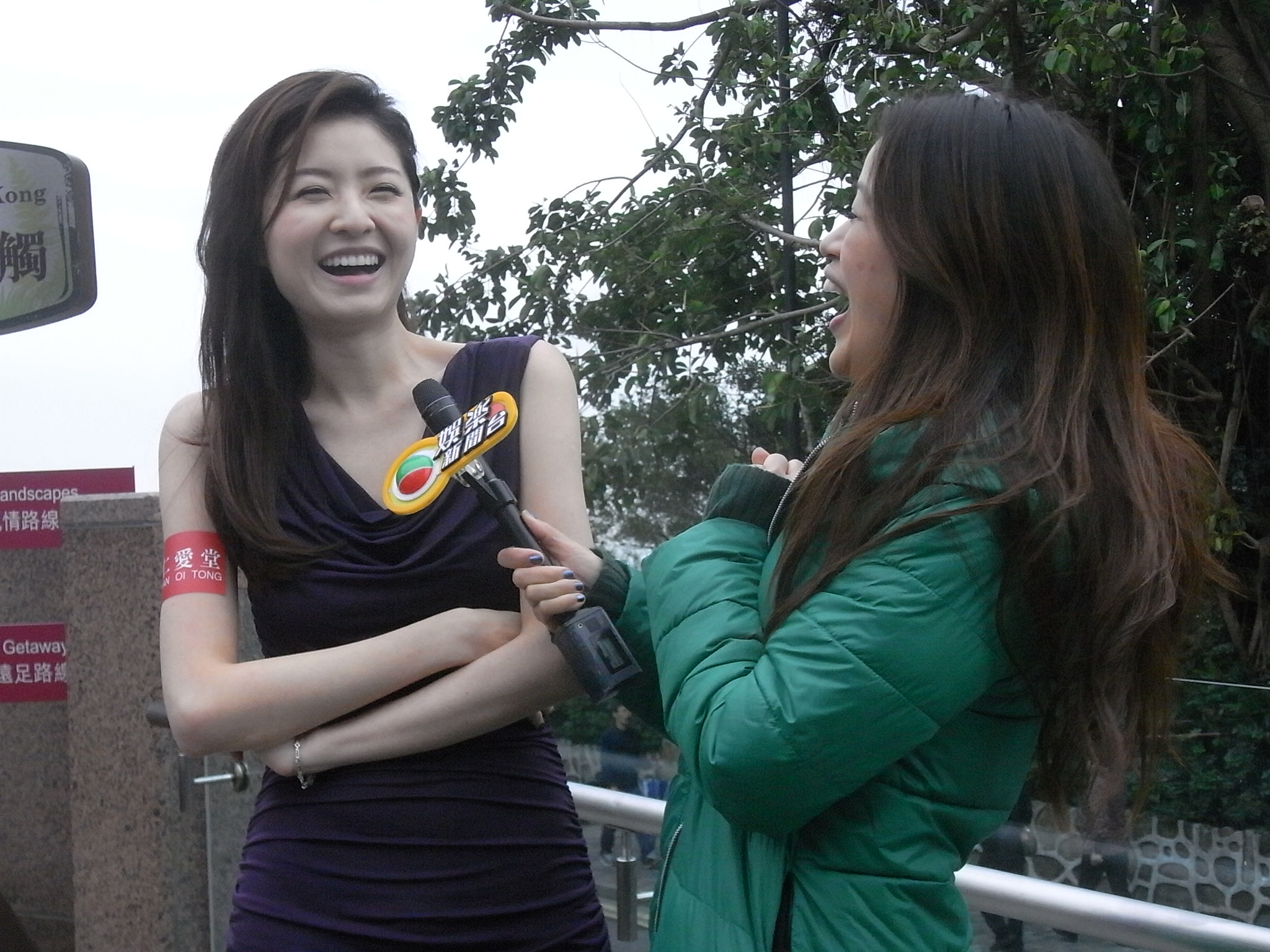
Chui presenting a charity activity in 2012

=== Film ===
Year	Title	Role	Notes
2008	L for Love L for Lies 《我的最愛》	Tiffany	Guest appearance

=== Music video appearances ===
- Eric Kwok - "專登" (2007)
- Juno Mak - "吃鯨魚的人"
- Raymond Lam (林峯) - "如果時間來到" (2009)

== Awards ==
- 2006 Miss Hong Kong Pageant - Tourism Ambassador
- 2007 Next Media Television Award - Most Charming New Star
- 2008 Happy Shop Outstanding Artist Award

Preceded by Erica Yuen	Miss Tourism Ambassador; 2006	Succeeded by Lily Ho
