= Sonija Kwok =

Canadian actress (born 1974)

- Kwok in 2026
- Born: 22 July 1974 (age 52); British Hong Kong
- Occupations: Actress; model
- Years active: 1999–present
- Spouse: Zhu Shaojie (m. 2011)
- Children: 1

Chinese name
- Hanyu Pinyin: Guō Xiànnī
- Jyutping: Kwok Sin Nei

Sonija Kwok Sin-nei (Chinese: 郭羨妮, born 22 July 1974) is a Hong Kong actress, model and beauty pageant titleholder who worked with TVB from 1999 to 2015. Since 2015 she has been managed by GAIA Entertainment.

== Early life ==
Kwok was born in Hong Kong and is of mixed three quarters Cantonese and one quarter English parentage. Kwok immigrated to Vancouver, British Columbia, Canada from Hong Kong. She initially attended the University of British Columbia, but transferred to Simon Fraser University where she completed her BA double major in Psychology and Economics. After obtaining her degree, Kwok joined Cathay Pacific as a flight attendant.

== Career ==
After a short stint as a flight attendant, Kwok returned to Hong Kong in 1999 and competed in the 1999 Miss Hong Kong pageant. During the semi-final, she won the Miss Photogenic award making her a favourite to win Miss Hong Kong following the precedent since 1996. She subsequently won the title "Miss Hong Kong" in July 1999 as well as Miss International Goodwill and Miss Intelligence. Coincidentally, all the winners of the Miss Hong Kong pageant spanning 1997 to 2000 are from Vancouver, British Columbia, Canada.

After winning the "Miss Hong Kong" title, Kwok appeared in numerous TVB events. In February 2000, she represented Hong Kong at the 2000 Miss Chinese International pageant in Las Vegas, Nevada. She was crowned as the winner and also won two other awards. She is considered one of the most successful winners, as she, Michelle Reis, Hera Chan, and Grace Chan are the only three Miss Hong Kong pageant winners to have held both titles. Reis was the winner for the pageant's inaugural year in 1988, while Chan won in 2014. After her success in both pageants, she represented Hong Kong at the Miss Universe 2000 pageant held in Cyprus. Although she did not feature in the top ten list, she was included in the top ten list of "Miss Photogenic" featured on the Miss Universe's website main page. She was the last representative from Hong Kong to participate in the Miss Universe contest until Miss Universe 2024.

She has appeared in many TVB television series and has starred in other TV shows, series, commercials, and entertainment functions, as well as being a spokeswoman for many beauty and other commercial products in Hong Kong. She has also appeared in television series produced in mainland China.

== Personal life ==
Kwok married Chinese martial arts choreographer Zhu Shaojie (朱少杰) in Guam in 2011. The pair met in a film shooting in China a year earlier.

Kwok was previously romantically linked to TVB stars Deric Wan and Steven Ma.

=== Maid assault ===
On 24 March 2009, Kwok was attacked by her maid, who bit her arm, pulled her hair and held a knife to her neck. This followed Kwok's reporting to the police of an earlier incident in which the maid, apparently distraught over the break-up of a relationship, held a knife to her own throat and was calmed by Kwok. The helper was subsequently held in a mental hospital.

== Awards ==
Miss Hong Kong 1999
Miss Photogenic, Miss Intelligence, Miss International Goodwill, Winner.
Miss Chinese International 2000
Winner, Miss Internet Popularity, and Miss Vegas Gorgeous.
Starhub TVB Awards 2010
My Favourite TVB Female Character 2009: Ying Jing-Jing 邢晶晶 (D.I.E. Again)

== Filmography ==
=== Television series ===
Year	Title	Role	Notes
2001	A Step Into the Past	Kam Ching / Chun Ching	
2001	Law Enforcers	Cheng Wai-ling	Episode 1
2002	Fight for Love	Ying Choi-yee	Warehoused, direct-to-DVD
2002	Where the Legend Begins	Kwok Huen	
2002	Family Man	Bobo Ko Po-yee	
2002	Love and Again	Suen Siu-yuet	
2003	Perish in the Name of Love	Princess Chiu-yan (Chu Fai-lan)	
2003	The Legend of Love	Chik-nui	
2003	The Driving Power	Ngan	Episode 20
2004	The Last Breakthrough	Hong Kiu	
2004	Angels of Mission	Chief Inspector Sam Sung Lok-kei	
2005	Hidden Treasures	Yuki Cheuk Lam	
2006	Lethal Weapons of Love and Passion	Kan Bing-wan	
2006	Vaganbond Vigilante	Wan Chi-lo	
2006	Au Revoir Shanghai	Tong Yan	
2006	Land of Wealth	Baba Hayee Ko-wah	
2006–07	The Conquest	Xishi	
2007	On the First Beat	Inspector Winnie Yuen Wai-nei	
2008	D.I.E.	Sergeant Ying Jing-jing	
2008–09	Pages of Treasures	Yuen Wai-chung	
2008	8 Avatar	Bai Mudan	
2009	D.I.E. Again	Sergeant Ying Jing-jing	
2009	ICAC Investigators 2009	Fong Chi-chuen	Episode: "Nail House"
2010	When Lanes Merge	Cheung Hiu-man	
2011	7 Days in Life	Christy Wong Ka-yu	
2011	Palace	Consort Xi	
2012	Palace II	Herself	Episode 35
2012	L'Escargot	Sze Long-kiu	
2012	The Greatness of a Hero	Cho Yuet	Previously warehoused; released on DVD in 2009
2012	Minguo Enchou Lu	Wang Lizhen	
2013	The Day of Days	Tong Nga-yuen	
2014	Ma Gu Xian Shou	Queen Mother	
2015	Under the Veil	Sheh Wan-chu	
2022	Inevitable	So Lai-tsun	ViuTV series; filmed 2021

=== Film ===
Year	Title	Role	Notes
2001	The Cheaters	Michelle Lui	
2001	The Replacement Suspects	Vivian Lee	a.k.a. The Replacement Suspect
2002	Fighting to Survive	Snooker / Ling	a.k.a. Bodyguard Of The Neighbourhood
2004	Hot Cop in the City	Judy Chu Jing	
2004	Unbearable Heights		a.k.a. Unbearable Height
2006	Wo Hu	Elaine	a.k.a. Operation Undercover a.k.a. Undercover Tiger
2007	Happy Birthday	Yan	
2011	The Sorcerer and the White Snake	Bu Ming	a.k.a. Madame White Snake
2019	Dearest Anita		
2019	Bodies at Rest		
2019	Back to the Past	Kam Ching (琴清)	
