= Living Up =

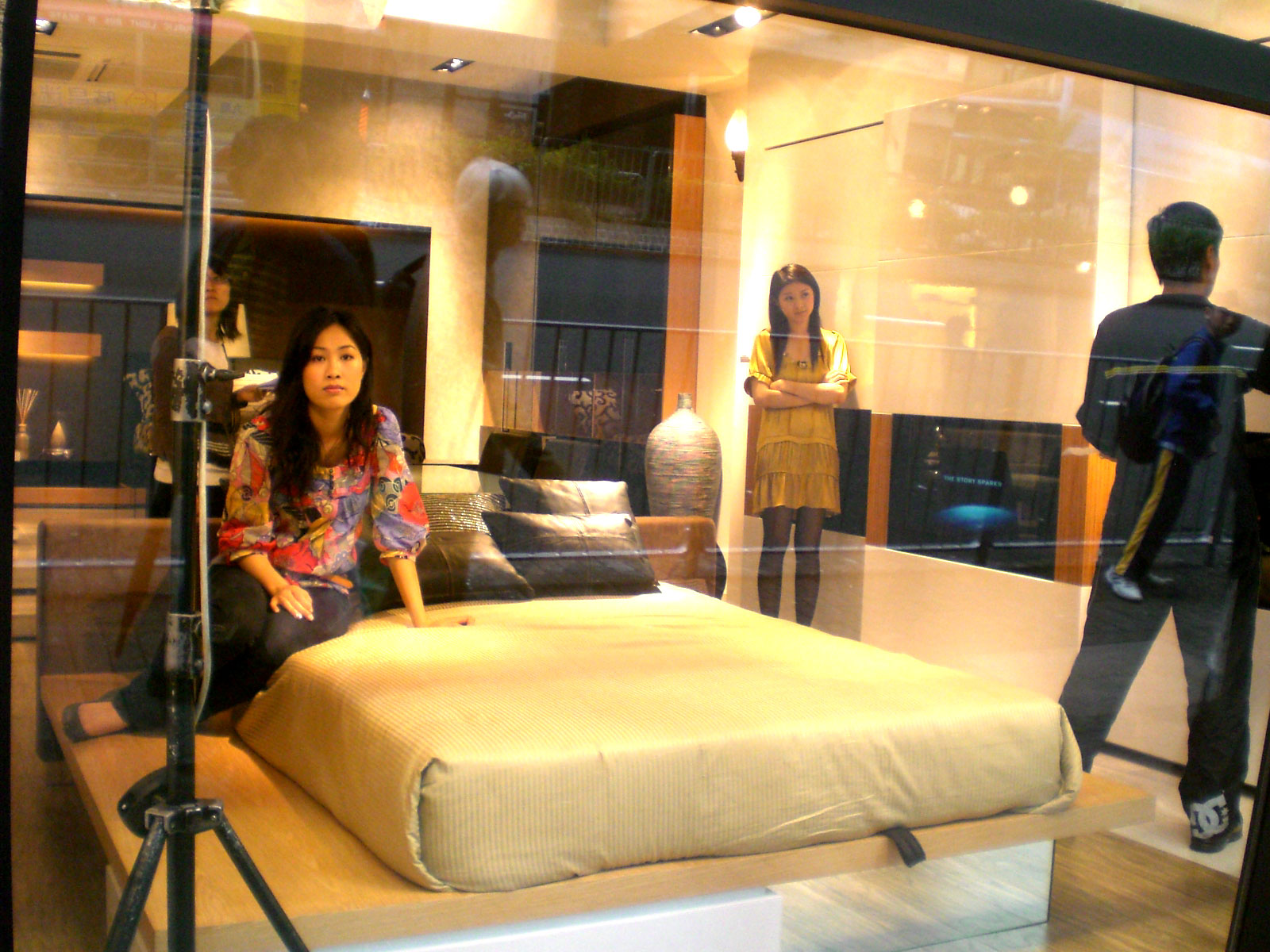
- On the set of the show, Candy Cheung (front) and Suki Chui (back)
- Genre: Lifestyle show
- Country of origin: Hong Kong
- Original language: Cantonese

Production
- Running time: 25 mins to 1 hr

Original release
- Network: Television Broadcasts Limited
- Release: November 4, 2005

Living Up (Chinese: 更上一層樓) is a Hong Kong TVB series about luxury housing. Luxurious type homes are generally referred to as "豪宅", literally a mansion, pronounced as "hou zaak" in Cantonese. The houses featured on the show are expensively furnished with some of the best city views, often accompanied by excellent feng shui.

== Geography ==
Hong Kong has a very limited land space. Many of the homes are large by HK standard, but are actually quite small by international standards.

== Seasons ==
Season number	Broadcast date	Host	Sponsors	Episodes
1	November 4, 2005; April 28, 2006	Kenix Kwok (郭可盈), Matthew Ko (高鈞賢), Heidi Chu (朱凱婷), Carrie Lam (林莉)	Midland holdings Ltd	26
2	August 11, 2006; November 3, 2006	Heidi Chu (朱凱婷), Vanessa Yeung (楊崢)	Country Garden	13
3	January 12, 2007; March 30, 2007	Margie Tsang (曾華倩), Carrie Lam (林莉), Sharon Luk (陸詩韻)	Country Garden	12
4	January 5, 2008	Maggie Cheung (張可頤)	Midland holdings Ltd	-
5	March 28, 2008	Maggie Cheung (張可頤), Shirley Yeung (楊思琦), Suki Chui (徐淑敏), Candy Cheung (張雪芹)	Midland holdings Ltd	17
6	August 29, 2008	Selena Li (李詩韻), Vanessa Yeung (楊崢), Candy Cheung (張雪芹)	Aviva (人壽保險)	-

== Episodes ==
Episode number	Broadcast date	Gueststars
17	August 1, 2008	Marty So (蘇晉霆) - Host of "Scoop" (東張西望)
18	August 29, 2008	Moses Chan (陳豪)
19	September 5, 2008	Halina Tam (譚小環)
20	September 12, 2008	Michelle Yim (米雪), Lee Heung Kam (李香琴)
21	September 19, 2008	Claire Yiu (姚嘉妮)
22	September 26, 2008	Kenneth Ma (馬國明)
23	October 3, 2008	Shermon Tang (鄧上文), English Tang (鄧英敏)
24	October 10, 2008	Raymond Cho (曹永廉)
25	October 17, 2008	Sharon Chan (陳敏之)
26	October 24, 2008	Carlo Ng (吳家樂)
27	November 14, 2008	Kenny Wong (黄德斌)
28	November 21, 2008	Patrick Dunn (鄧梓峰)
29	November 28, 2008	Anna Yau (邱凱敏)
30	December 5, 2008	Winnie Yeung (楊婉儀)
