= Pages of Treasures =

Hong Kong television drama

- Promo poster
- Click入黃金屋
- Genre: Modern, Family, Comedy
- Created by: Hong Kong Television Broadcasts Limited
- Written by: Sin Chui Jing; Leung Man Wah; Yuan May Fung; Lui Sau Lin; Tam Chui San; Chung Ya Si
- Starring: Wayne Lai; Sonija Kwok; Paul Chun; Eric Suen; Vivien Yeo; Shirley Yeung; Sharon Chan; Jason Chan
- Theme music composer: Victor Tse Kwok Wai
- Opening theme: My Most Beloved 我的最愛 by Eric Suen
- Country of origin: Hong Kong
- Original language: Cantonese
- No. of episodes: 20

Production
- Producer: Mui Siu Ching
- Production location: Hong Kong
- Editors: Leung Man Wa; Ka Wai Nam
- Camera setup: Multi camera
- Running time: 45 minutes
- Production company: TVB

Original release
- Network: Jade
- Release: 8 December 2008 – 2 January 2009

Related
- When Easterly Showers Fall on the Sunny West; Royal Tramp

Pages of Treasures
- Traditional Chinese: Click入黃金屋
- Simplified Chinese: Click入黃金屋
- Literal meaning: "CLICK Into The Golden House"
Transcriptions
Standard Mandarin
- Hanyu Pinyin: CLICK rù huáng jīn wū
Yue: Cantonese
- Yale Romanization: CLICK Yap Wong gam uk
- Jyutping: CLICK jap6 wong4 gam1 nguk1

Pages of Treasures (Traditional Chinese: Click入黃金屋) is a TVB modern drama series broadcast in December 2008.

== Synopsis ==
Fong Hok-Man (Paul Chun) works in a bookstore and lives by the principles that knowledge is power. He has 3 children, 2 sons - Sum-Ming (Wayne Lai) and Sum-Ching (Eric Suen) and a daughter, Sum-Mei (Lily Ho). Sum Ming is not good in his studies and did not further his education at the tertiary level. However, Sum-Ching is very smart and chose to further his studies in IT at a university in United States. To fund his studies, Sum Ming works hard in Mauritius for better pay.

The two brothers now decide to return to Hong Kong. Coincidentally, they both end up working in the same commercial building, Sum-Ming as a security guard while Sum-Ching works as a Senior network Security Engineer. Hok-Man is afraid that the brothers' different job levels will cause a rift in their relationship.

Sum Ming starts to fall for Yuen Wai-Chung (Sonija Kwok), who owns a clay model shop. Hok-Man tries to help Sum Ming launch a better career by buying a bookstore for him to manage. Sum-Ching, who already has a girlfriend, Abbie Lui Yuen-Yee (Shirley Yeung), starts to fall for his colleague, Chui Hei-Man (Vivien Yeo).

== Cast ==
=== The Fong family ===
Cast	Role	Description
Paul Chun	Fong Hok Man 方學文	Retired Bookstore Stocker; Ngan Yu Yuk's husband. Fong Sam Ming, Sam-Ching, and Sam Mei's father.
Mary Hon	Ngan Yue Yuk 顏如玉	Housewife; Fong Hok Man's wife. Fong Sam Ming, Sam-Ching, and Sam Mei's mother.
Wayne Lai	Fong Sam Ming 方心明	Security Guard; Yuen Wai Chung's boyfriend.
Eric Suen (孫耀威)	Fong Sam Ching (Alex) 方心正	Security IT Analyst; Lui Yuen Yee's boyfriend. Chui Hei Man's ex-boyfriend.
Lily Ho	Fong Sam Mei (Sammi) 方心美	High School Student; Lui Tsu Pui's girlfriend.

=== The Lui family ===
Cast	Role	Description
Kara Hui	Ah Fan 阿芬	Lui Yuen Yee and Chui Hei Man's mother.
Shirley Yeung	Lui Yuen Yee (Abbie) 雷婉儀	Nutritionist; Fong Sam Ching's girlfriend. Chui Hei Man's older half-sister
Jason Chan (陳智燊)	Lui Tsu Pui (Patrick) 雷樹培	Cafe Owner; Fong Sam Mei's boyfriend.

=== Other cast ===
Cast	Role	Description
Sonija Kwok	Yuen Wai Chung 袁慧中	Clay Model Instructor; Lai Pui Chi's best friend Fong Sam Ming's girlfriend
Fred Cheng	Yuen Ka Hei 袁家曦	Yuen Wai Zhong's younger brother.
Sharon Chan	Lai Pui Chi (Pansy) 黎佩慈	Real Estate Agent; Yuen Wai Chung's best friend.
Vivien Yeo	Tsui Hei Man (Hillary) 徐希敏	Security IT Analyst; Fong Sam Ching's ex-girlfriend. Lui Yuen Yee's younger step-sister
Macy Chan (陳美詩)	Michelle	Model

== Awards and nominations ==
TVB Anniversary Awards (2009)

- Best Drama
- Most Improved Actress (Sharon Chan)

== Viewership ratings ==
	Week	Episode	Average Points	Peaking Points	References
1	December 8–12, 2008	1 — 5	27	31	
2	December 15–19, 2008	6 — 10	25	—	
3	December 22–26, 2008	11 — 15	24	—	
4	December 29, 2008 - January 2, 2009	16 — 20	28	33	
