= D.I.E. Again =

- Promo poster
- D.I.E. Again 古靈精探B
- Genre: Comedy drama Paranormal; Crime
- Written by: Wong Kwok Fai
- Starring: Roger Kwok; Sonija Kwok; Nancy Wu; Edwin Siu; Derek Kok; Kwok Fung; Rain Lau; Mimi Lo; Kitty Yuen; Jess Shum
- Country of origin: Hong Kong
- Original language: Cantonese
- No. of episodes: 24 (Hong Kong); 25 (Overseas)

Production
- Producer: Nelson Cheung
- Running time: 45 minutes (approx.); Shooting: November 2008 - January 2009

Original release
- Network: TVB
- Release: August 18 – September 19, 2009

Related
- Burning Flame III; In the Chamber of Bliss; D.I.E. (2008)

D.I.E. Again - Death Investigation Extension II (Traditional Chinese: 古靈精探B) is a TVB modern comedy-action series. It stars Roger Kwok, Sonija Kwok, Nancy Wu, Edwin Siu, Derek Kok, Kwok Fung, Rain Lau, Mimi Lo, Kitty Yuen & Jess Shum.

The series is a sequel to D.I.E. (古靈精探) aired in 2008. Filming began in November as stated by Roger Kwok on his blog.

== Synopsis ==
Although D.I.E had been dissolved and the officers returned to their previous departments, their odd habits continue to follow them, resulting in many troubles for the police force. The senior staff decide to bring the D.I.E back, this time headed by Lo Sir, Yue Sir's former supervisor. Yue Sir and Jing Jing have a baby boy and Jing jing returns to work after trying to be a housewife to no avail. Initially working with the homicide unit again, she is still always chasing Dai-Hau-Ying, and after several incidents is sent back to D.I.E. Ying seems to have become less evil than before, but Jing jing continues to attempt arrest, much to the chagrin of her supervisors.

Lo Sir's daughter Lo Pak Chi admires Jing jing and follow her into D.I.E. Yue Sir's father and sister left Hong Kong, leaving Zheng-Yee alone and he gradually develops an affection for Pui pui, Jing Jing's younger sister. Together the two face breakups, illness, attacks, and Pui pui's rise to fame as she becomes a celebrity-dancer-model in Kam Ji Fung's entertainment company. This sequence has a lot of focus on the political ways within entertainment industries, and has a few episodes showing visits into TVB city. Baby Yue has special powers just like his daddy as well.

== Cast ==
=== The Yue Family ===
Cast	Role	Description
Roger Kwok	Yue Chi Long (Yue Sir) 于子朗	D.I.E. Investigator Sergeant. Ying Jing Jing's husband.
Sonija Kwok	Ying Jing Jing (Madam Ying) 邢晶晶	D.I.E. Investigator Sergeant. Yue Chi Long's wife. Ying Pui Pui's older sister. Ying Nam & Ng Suk Tuk's daughter. Gum Sam Shun's granddaughter.
Rain Lau (劉玉翠)	Kan Ji Mei (Sa Yee)(Anastasia) 簡緻美	Yue Chi Long's aunt.

=== The Ying Family ===
Cast	Role	Description
Teresa Ha (夏萍)	Gum Sam Shun 金三順	Ying Nam's mother. Ng Suk Tuk's mother-in-law. Ying Jing Jing and Ying Pui Pui's grandmother.
Chun Wong (秦煌)	Ying Nam 刑 楠	Gum Sam Shun's son. Ng Suk Tuk's husband. Ying Jing Jing and Ying Pui Pui's father.
Lee Fung (李楓)	Ng Suk Tuk 吳淑德	Ying Nam's wife. Gam Sam Shun's daughter-in-law. Ying Jing Jing and Ying Pui Pui's mother.
Nancy Wu	Ying Pui Pui (Momoko) 邢珮珮	Matchmaker Consultant. Ying Jing Jing's younger sister. Cheung Ching Yee's girlfriend. Ying Nam & Ng Suk Tuk's daughter. Gum Sam Shun's granddaughter.

=== D.I.E. (Death Investigation Extension) Unit ===
Cast	Role	Description
Samuel Kwok (郭峰)	Lo Yau Hang (Lo Sir) 羅有恆	Head of D.I.E. Superintendent. Lo Pak Chi's father.
Derek Kok	Cheung Ching-Yee 張正義	D.I.E. Investigator Senior Constable. Yue's elder sister's ex-boyfriend. Ying Pui Pui's boyfriend Bruce Lee Aficionado
Mimi Lo (羅敏莊)	Pang Mei Wan 彭美雲	D.I.E. Investigator Constable. Pierre's wife.
(冼灝英)	Tse Siu Fung 謝小鳳	D.I.E. Investigator Senior Constable.
Macy Chan (陳美詩)	Lo Pak Chi (Pat) 羅柏芝	D.I.E. Investigator Constable. Lo Yau Hang's daughter.
Him Law	Jim Shu Bong 詹樹邦	D.I.E. Investigator Constable. Likes Pat

=== Other cast ===
Cast	Role	Description
Stefan Wong	Man Lung (Pierre) 文 龍	Forensic Pathologist. Pang Mei Wan's husband.
Kitty Yuen (阮小儀)	So Bik 蘇碧	Fortuneteller. Former con artist
Suet Nay (雪妮)	Cheung Muk Lan 張沐蘭	Cheung Ching Yee's aunt. Character actress
Edwin Siu (蕭正楠)	Kam Ji Fung (Jose) 甘至峰	Anastasia and Momoko's old boss. Has Dissociative identity disorder Criminal
Wong Ching (王青)	Chan Gai Ying (Dai Hao Ying) 陳繼英	Criminal. Madam Ying's lifelong nemesis.
Stephen Wong Ka-Lok	Wong Tong 王棠	Criminal
Jessie Shum (沈卓盈)	Luk On Tung (Icy) 陸安彤	Forensic Pathologist. Nightclub dancer
Eric Li	Yan Heung Wah (Sean) 甄向華	Sought revenge for his twin brother Fred; Mental patient Cheung Ching Yee's younger half-brother
Manna Chan	So Sze Nga (Sylvia) 蘇詩雅	Cheung Ching Yee and Yan Heung Wing's mother

== Awards and nominations ==
TVB Anniversary Awards (2009)

- Nominated - Best Drama
- Nominated - Best Actor (Roger Kwok)
- Nominated - Best Actress (Sonija Kwok)
- Nominated - Best Supporting Actor (Derek Kok)
- Nominated - My Favourite Male Character (Roger Kwok)
- Nominated - My Favourite Female Character (Sonija Kwok)

== Viewership ratings ==
	Week	Episode	Average Points	Peaking Points	References
1	August 17–23, 2009	1 — 4	29	31	
2	August 24–28, 2009	5 — 9	31	32	
3	August 31 - September 3, 2009	10 — 14	33	34	
4	September 7–11, 2009	15 — 18	31	33	
5	September 14–18, 2009	19 — 23	33	38	
5	September 19, 2009	24	29	33	
