= Lord of Shanghai =

Lord of Shanghai may refer to:

- Lord of Shanghai (TV series), 2015 Hong Kong TV series
- Lord of Shanghai (film), 2017 Chinese film
