= Jolene Chin =

Malaysian actress

- Born: January 18, 1980 (age 46); Kuala Lumpur, Malaysia
- Occupations: Actress, Model

Chinese name
- Traditional Chinese: 陳影雯
- Simplified Chinese: 陈影雯
Transcriptions
Standard Mandarin
- Hanyu Pinyin: Chén Yǐng Wén
Yue: Cantonese
- Jyutping: Can4 Jing2 Man4
Southern Min
- Hokkien POJ: Tân Éng-bûn
- Tâi-lô: Tân Íng-bûn

Jolene Chin Yeng-Mun or Chan Ying Man, or Chen Ying Wen (Traditional Chinese: 陳影雯), is a beauty pageant queen from Kuala Lumpur, Malaysia. She won the title of Miss Astro Chinese International in 2004 where she received the Miss Friendship Award and Miss Elegance Award and, represented Malaysia at the Miss Chinese International Pageant. She also won the Miss Chinese International Friendship Award in 2005. She can speak English, Hokkien, Cantonese, Mandarin, and Malay.

== Education ==
Jolene studied at a Chinese primary school but went to Australia to further her studies. It was at Perth where she studied finance and marketing and graduated with a bachelor's degree in commerce, Finance & Marketing. She was also formerly a marketing executive.

== Career ==
In an interview with Mobile World Magazine about what she was doing after she won the Miss Astro Chinese International Pageant, she stated that she was doing some fashion shoots, catwalk modelling and acting in short dramas for TV. Jolene also said that she was working on a project about child abuse, and training as a counsellor to help abused children. At the time, she was the PR director for Kiwanis Sri Hartamas, as well. When questioned about what career track she wanted to follow, Jolene replied: "For the moment, I’m going to continue doing hosting and emceeing work. I’d like to learn more about PR and advertising. Eventually work towards setting up my own business someday…".

== Awards ==
- 2004: Miss Astro Chinese International - also Miss Friendship and Miss Elegance
- 2005: Miss Friendship (Miss Chinese International)
