= Always Ready (TV series) =

- Official poster
- 隨時候命
- Genre: Aviation drama
- Starring: Ekin Cheng; Bowie Lam; Charmaine Sheh; Shirley Yeung; Linda Chung; Lai Lok-yi
- Opening theme: "隨時候命" by Ekin Cheng
- Ending theme: "飛鹰翱翔" by Bowie Lam
- Country of origin: Hong Kong
- Original language: Cantonese
- No. of episodes: 30

Production
- Running time: 45 minutes (approx.)

Original release
- Network: TVB Jade
- Release: November 21 – December 30, 2005

Always Ready (Traditional Chinese: 隨時候命) is a Hong Kong aviation drama series produced by TVB and aired its channel TVB Jade from 21 November to 30 December 2005.

The series is centered on the Government Flying Service, which is responsible for search and rescue (SAR), air ambulance, firefighting and assisting in police operations. It is sometimes said by viewers that it is a combination of Burning Flame and Triumph in the Skies.

== Synopsis ==
Up and down crests and troughs,
In and out of waves and seas,
The Government Flying Service saves lives.

- Matthew Ko Hor-fung (Ekin Cheng) is part of the Government Flying Service (GFS), serving as the second commander of air crew. He has a girlfriend Carrie Hong Yau-nam (Charmaine Sheh) who has been in a coma for three years from a car accident. She finally awakes from her coma, and recovers her memory speedily with Matthew's attentive help. Matthew is a commander air-crew who always do on-air rescue via a let-down rope attached to the GFS helicopters.
- Carrie Hong Yau-nam (Charmaine Sheh), Matthew's girlfriend who is in coma for 3 years and finally wakes up after Matthew's continuous and touching efforts. However, Carrie couldn't accept all the changes in the 3 years of her coma and was obviously rejecting Matthew. But after tons of struggling and thoughts over it, she realises that Matthew's strengths and decide that she should start afresh and gives him a chance. Carrie, before her coma was a doctor in the A&E department of a hospital, however by a twist of luck, she joined GFS as an Air-crew doctor on board the helicopter alongside Matthew. Matthew's friend, Benjamin Yip Ching-wan (Bowie Lam), who is the first commander pilot of the GFS becomes good friends with Carrie and they start a new relationship.
- Nikki Chow Siu-kuen (Shirley Yeung) is a GFS tower communicator that controls the ATC commands of GFS helicopters. She uses a wheelchair. She strives to be positive towards life. She is always seen to bicker with Kelvin but always secretly giving him valuable advice. Was once in love with Benjamin, but realised that Ben has no feelings for her, before she decided to cease her "idolizing love" towards him.
- Sandra Si Choi-kei (Linda Chung) is a newly recruited air crew who is under the mentor of Matthew. They had their differences at first but eventually began a relationship after Matthew and Carrie broke up.
- Kelvin Chiang Ka-nok (Lai Lok-yi) is a nervous and yet timid pilot. He is scared on his real time practice conducted by his mentor, Benjamin. However, with much patience and guidance, Kelvin is able to slowly overcome it eventually. At one point of time, he is secretly in love with Sandra and have to often seek help from Nikki. But with a twist of plot, the timid Kelvin became in love with Nikki.

During a mission, Benjamin and his student Kelvin Chiang Ka-nok (Lai Lok-yi) flew over an illegal gas station which suddenly exploded and takes the helicopter into the sea. All the crew man are saved except for Benjamin. Due to the heavy fog, the search for Benjamin is cancelled and can only be brought forward till the next day. GFS searches high and low for Benjamin and he was found at last.

Eventually Matthew and Sandra are together, Derek (a trainee) and Matthew's sister are together, Carrie and Ben are together and Nikki and Kelvin are together.

== Cast ==
Cast	Role	Description
Ekin Cheng	Ko Hor-fung (Matthew) 高可風	GFS Second Commander of Air Crew. Hong Yau-nam's ex-boyfriend. Si Choh-kei's boyfriend. Jacky's godfather.
Bowie Lam	Yip Ching-wan (Benjamin) 葉青雲	GFS First Commander Pilot. Hong Yau-nam's boyfriend. Jacky's father.
Charmaine Sheh	Hong Yau-nam (Carrie) 康友嵐	GFS Doctor. Ko Hor-fung's ex-girlfriend. Yip Ching-wan's girlfriend.
Shirley Yeung	Chow Siu-kuen (Nikki) 周小娟	GFS Controller. Chiang Ka-nok's girlfriend.
Linda Chung	Si Choh-kei (Sandra) 施楚淇	GFS Air Crew. Ko Hor-fung's girlfriend.
Lai Lok-yi	Chiang Ka-nok (Kelvin) 蔣加諾	GFS Second Commander Pilot. Chow Siu-kuen's boyfriend.
Charles Szeto (司徒瑞祈)	Chik Chi-kan 戚志勤	Lai Siu's stepfather. Kon Hor-oi's boyfriend.
Ngo Ka-nin	Hong Yau-wah 康友華	GFS Crew. Hong Yau-nam's brother.
Wilson Tsui (艾威)	Yiu Tak-keung 姚德強	GFS Crew.
Joel Chan	Siu Chi-ming 蕭志明	GFS Crew.
Kenny Wong	Tsang Siu-lun 曾兆倫	GFS Crew.
Elaine Yiu	Ko Hor-oi 高可愛	Ko Hor-fung's younger sister. Chik Chi-kan's girlfriend.
Benz Hui	Ko Yue-cheung 高裕昌	Ko Hor-fung and Ko Hor-oi's father.

== Awards and nominations ==
=== Awards ===
39th TVB Anniversary Awards (2005)

- "Best Actress in a Supporting Role" (Shirley Yeung - Nikki Chow Siu-Kuen)

=== Nominations ===
39th TVB Anniversary Awards (2005)

- "Best Drama"
- "Best Actor in a Leading Role" (Ekin Cheng - Matthew Ko Hor-Fung)
- "Best Actress in a Supporting Role" (Shirley Yeung - Nikki Chow Siu-Kuen)
