= Lily Ho Ngo Yee =

Chinese actress from Hong Kong

Lily Ho
- Chinese: 何傲兒
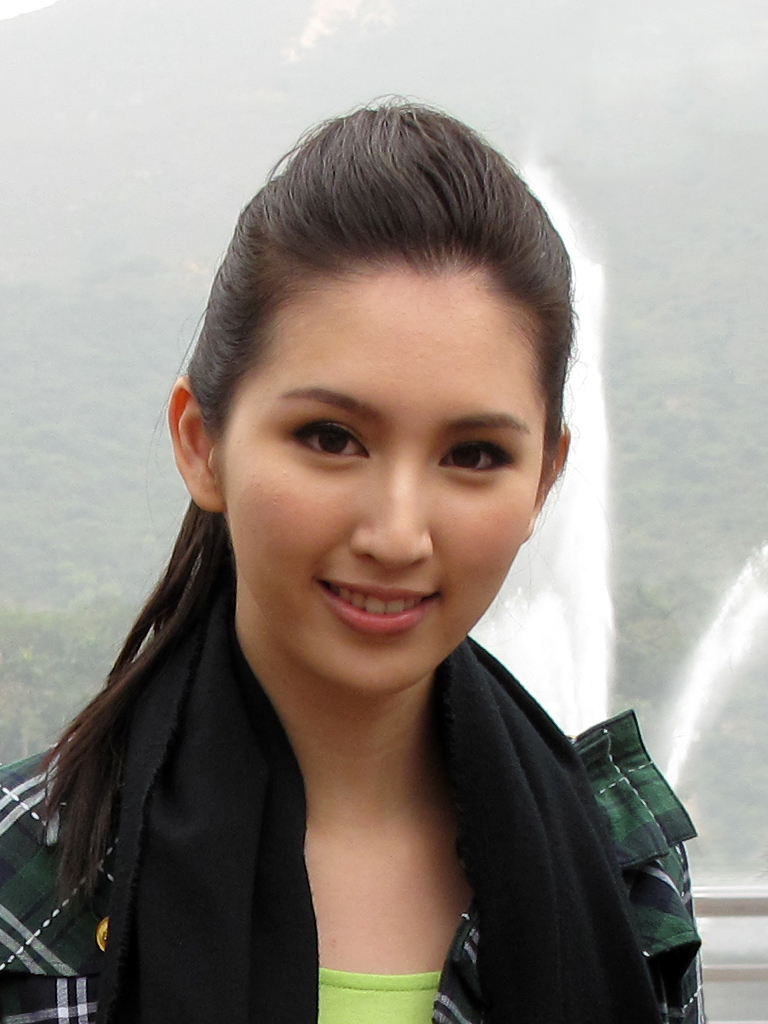
- Ho in 2010
- Born: 27 September 1988 (age 37); Hong Kong
- Other names: Lily Ho Ngo-Yee, Ho Ngou-Yi, Ho Ngo-Chi, Gigi Ho
- Occupation: Actress
- Years active: 2008–2015

Chinese name
Transcriptions
Standard Mandarin
- Hanyu Pinyin: Hé Ào Er
Yue: Cantonese
- Jyutping: Ho4 Ngou6 Yi4

Lily Ho (Chinese: 何傲兒) is a Hong Kong actress from Hong Kong. Ho is a Miss Hong Kong 2007 contestant and winner of Miss Tourism Ambassador. Ho is known for her role as Sammi in Pages of Treasures.

== Career ==
In 2007. Ho was a contestant of Miss Hong Kong 2007, she won the Miss Tourism Ambassador special award but was not placed. In 2008, Ho began her acting career. She left TVB in 2015 after her contract ended.

== Filmography ==
=== Television ===
Year	Title	Role
2008	Best Selling Secrets	Hidy Lee
2008	Off Pedder	Suki
2008	Pages of Treasures	Sammi
2009	Beyond the Realm of Conscience	Chi Lan
2009	D.I.E. Again	Lee Ching Man
2010	Fly with Me	Apple
2010	72 Tenants of Prosperity	
2010	Beauty Knows No Pain	Amy
2010	Some Day	Kei Kei
2011	Only You	Lam Pui Pui
2011	My Sister of Eternal Flower	Kim Kim
2011	Be Home for Dinner	Tseun Ding Kei
2011	The Life and Times of a Sentinel	Sham Chui Yuk
2011	Forensic Heroes III	Baby
2012	Daddy Good Deeds	Susan
2012	Master of Play	Tansy Kan Chi Ying
2012	Highs and Lows	Esther Lee Hoi Yin
2013	Missing You	Hailey Lam
2013	Sniper Standoff	Chan Mo Zi
2015	Every Step You Take	Sally
2016	Speed of Life	Kan Tai-wai
2018	The Way We Were	Catherine

=== Films ===
This is a partial list of films.

- 2010 72 Tenants of Prosperity - Lucky, Sales of Qiu Tian Zhan
- 2010 Perfect Wedding
- 2015 Return of the Cuckoo
- 2016 Buddy Cops

== See also ==
- Kayi Cheung, Miss Hong Kong 2007
