= Forensic Heroes (franchise) =

Hong Kong television series

- The Forensic Heroes logo, as seen in every series
- Created by: Mui Siu-ching
- Original work: Forensic Heroes (2006)

Films and television
- Television series: Forensic Heroes (2006); Forensic Heroes II (2008); Forensic Heroes III (2011); Forensic Heroes IV (2020); Forensic Heroes V (2022); Forensic Heroes VI: Redemption (2024)

Forensic Heroes series
- Traditional Chinese: 法證先鋒系列
- Simplified Chinese: 法证先锋系列
- Literal meaning: "Forensic science vanguard series"
Transcriptions
Standard Mandarin
- Hanyu Pinyin: Fǎzhèng Xiānfēng Xìliè
Yue: Cantonese
- Jyutping: Faat3 Zing3 Sin1 Fung1 Hai6 Lit6

Forensic Heroes is a series of TVB police procedural television dramas written by Choi Ting-ting (I–III), Chan Ching-yee (I–II), Leung Man-wah (III-IV), Yuen Mei-fung (IV), Sin Chui-ching (IV), Yip Tin-shing (V) and Sin Siu-chun (V), and produced by Mui Siu-ching (I-IV) and Ben Fong (IV-V). The series follows a group of Hong Kong forensic scientists working together with the Hong Kong police to solve murders through physical evidence left over from crime scenes. Currently, two serials and three reboot installment were produced.

The series is said to be a contemporary version of the successful historical-fiction series Witness to a Prosecution (1999–2002), a drama that documents the life of Chinese forensic medical expert Song Ci. Forensic Heroes is also said to be loosely influenced by the American television series CSI: Crime Scene Investigation. However, unlike CSI, which uses significantly darker and bleaker lighting throughout its episodes, Forensic Heroes is presented in a brighter, more clinical atmosphere.

The series first installment, Forensic Heroes, originally ran for 25 episodes on TVB Jade from 13 June to 16 July 2006. The drama met critical acclaim and became a popular hit, with the episode finale peaking to 43 points with over 2.7 million viewers. Two years later, TVB released the subsequent sequel, Forensic Heroes II, running for 30 episodes from 19 May to 28 June 2008. Though the sequel proved successful, ratings did not break 40 points.

A reboot of the original series, Forensic Heroes III premiered on 10 October 2011, and was the most watched TVB drama of 2011. Another reboot, Forensic Heroes IV, premiered on 17 February 2020, and was the most watched TVB drama since 2013. The third reboot, Forensic Heroes V, premiered on 26 October 2022.

== Series outline ==
The series follows a group of forensic professionals from the Hong Kong General Laboratory and police officers from the Kowloon West Police Headquarters. Working under the hot urban environments of Hong Kong, the investigators use scientific evidence obtained from the forensic scientists to solve crimes. The first two installments stars Tim Sir (Bobby Au-yeung), a senior forensic chemist, and his best friend Sam Koo (Frankie Lam), a senior forensic pathologist and a popular detective fiction novelist. The two work closely with Senior Inspector Nicole Leung (Yoyo Mung) and Sergeant Sum Hung (Raymond Cho) of the Kowloon West District Crime Squad. In the sequel, two new characters, science evidence officer Ivan Yeung (Kevin Cheng) and Senior Inspector Isabella Ma (Charmaine Sheh) were added to the cast.

The third and fourth installments are separate reboots, each following a similar outline to the original duology but features different cast and characters. The third installment stars Pro Sir (Wayne Lai), a senior forensic chemist, and his close friend Mandy Chung (Maggie Cheung Ho-yee), a senior forensic pathologist. The two work closely with Senior Inspector Ada Ling (Kate Tsui) and Sergeant Lee Chin-fung (Ron Ng) of the Kowloon West District Crime Squad.

The fourth installment stars Ko Sir (Raymond Wong), a senior forensic chemist, and his close friend, Man Ka-hei (Selena Lee), a senior forensic pathologist and Shui Wai-ming (Alice Chan), a science evidence officer. The three work closely with Senior Inspector King Sir (Shaun Tam) and Sergeant Ko Ching (Rebecca Zhu) of the Kowloon West Regional Crime Unit.

The fifth installment stars Yu Sir (Bosco Wong), a senior forensic chemist, and his close friend, Fan Pui-ching (Jacky Cai), a senior forensic pathologist. The two work closely with Senior Inspector Cheng Sir (Benjamin Yuen) of the Kowloon West Regional Crime Unit.

== Installments ==
=== Forensic Heroes (2006) ===
- The forensics department consists of Dr. Timothy Ko (Bobby Au-yeung), Dr. Sam Koo (Frankie Lam), Lam Ting-ting (Linda Chung), Yvonne Mok (Florence Kwok), Leung Siu-kong (Fred Cheng), Kelvin Chu (Wai Kar-hung), Jeff Lau (Deno Cheung), Man Choi (Joel Chan), Tina Chan (Candy Chiu), and Victor Ma (Leung Kin-ping).
- The crime unit consists of Senior Inspector Nicole Leung (Yoyo Mung), Senior Inspector Wong (Au Sui-wai), Sergeant Sum Hung (Raymond Cho), Officer Josie Ling (Vivien Yeo), Officer Ho Wing-cheung (Yeung Ying-wai), Officer Terrence Lau (Eddie Li), and Officer Cheng Wai-shing (Oscar Leung).

=== Forensic Heroes II (2008) ===
- The forensics department consists of Dr. Timothy Ko, Dr. Sam Koo, Lam Ting-ting, Yvonne Mok, Leung Siu-kong, Jeff Lau, Tina Chan, Victor Ma, and with the additions of Ivan Yeung (Kevin Cheng) and Man Wong (Jason Chan).
- The crime unit consists of Senior Inspector Nicole Leung, Senior Inspector Wong, Sergeant Sum Hung, Officer Josie Ling, Officer Terrence Lau, Officer Cheng Wai-shing, and with the additions of Senior Inspector Isabella Ma (Charmaine Sheh) and Officer Wilson Mok (Matthew Ko).

=== Forensic Heroes III (2011) ===
- The forensics department consists of Dr. Jack Po (Wayne Lai), Dr. Mandy Chung (Maggie Cheung Ho-yee), Angel Chiang (Aimee Chan), Ken Ho (Edwin Siu), Paul Yau (Ram Chiang), Gary Leung (Yeung Chiu-hoi), Lawrence Yuen (Brian Tse), Eric Lau (Stanley Cheung), Rosie Wong (Aurora Li) and Sunny Suen (Ronald Law).
- The crime unit consists of Chief Inspector Jason Ko (Geoffrey Wong), Senior Inspector Ada Ling (Kate Tsui), Sergeant Lee Chin-fung (Ron Ng), Officer Lam Hong-chan (Jim Tang), Officer Lai Ming-wai (Sammy Sum), Officer Wu Sin-hang (Otto Chan) and Officer Lee Ka-lo (Jess Sum).

=== Forensic Heroes IV (2020) ===
- The forensics department consists of Dr. Ko On (Raymond Wong), Dr. Man Ka-hei (Selena Lee), Shui Wai-ming (Alice Chan), Charm Ting (Fred Cheng), Ocean Lam (William Chu), Howard Chan (Terrence Huang) and Ivan Szeto (Fred Cheung).
- The crime unit consists of Senior Inspector Kwok Fai-wong (Shaun Tam), Sergeant Ko Ching (Rebecca Zhu), Officer Yu Wai-ding (Arnold Kwok), Officer Mok King-chiu (Fei Wu) and Officer Tong Sum-yuet (Wiyona Yeung).

=== Forensic Heroes V (2022) ===
- The forensics department consists of Dr. Yu Sing-pak (Bosco Wong), Dr. Ruby Fan (Jacky Cai), Dr. Fu Kim-shing (Karl Ting), Charm Ting (Fred Cheng), Cheung Sai-hei (Matthew Ko), Leung Chi-san (Telford Wong), Kevin Chau (Randal Tsang), Tony Chung (Lincoln Hui), Kate Song (Jumbo Tsang), Dr. Tsui Yat-ming (Matthew Chu), Dr. Wing Ho (Dolby Kwan).
- The crime unit consists of Senior Inspector Cheng Ho-yin (Benjamin Yuen), Sergeant Tong Sum-yuet (Wiyona Yeung), Officer Fok Bo-ying (Venus Wong), Officer Lee Wai (Danny Hung), Officer Fu Siu-kei (Gordon Ip) and Officer Luk Ka-chun (Chau Ka-Chuen).

== Principal cast ==
=== Forensics Department ===
| Role | Character | Installment | | | | | |
| Role | Character | I | II | III | IV | V | VI |
|---|---|---|---|---|---|---|---|
| Forensic Laboratory Supervisor / Senior Chemist | Dr. Timothy Ko (Tim Sir) | Bobby Au-yeung | Bobby Au-yeung | | | | |
| Forensic Laboratory Supervisor / Senior Chemist | Dr. Jack Po (Pro Sir) | | | Wayne Lai | | | |
| Forensic Laboratory Supervisor / Senior Chemist | Dr. Ko On | | | | Raymond Wong | | |
| Forensic Laboratory Supervisor / Senior Chemist | Dr. Yu Sing-pak | | | | | Bosco Wong | Bosco Wong |
| Senior Forensic Pathologist | Dr. Sam Koo | Frankie Lam | Frankie Lam | | | | |
| Senior Forensic Pathologist | Dr. Mandy Chung | | | Maggie Cheung Ho-yee | | | |
| Senior Forensic Pathologist | Dr. Man Ka-hei | | | | Selena Lee | | |
| Senior Forensic Pathologist | Dr. Ruby Fan | | | | | Jackie Cai | Jackie Cai |
| Forensic Supervisor / Scientific Evidence Officer (S.E.O.) | Yvonne Mok | Florence Kwok | Florence Kwok | | | | |
| Forensic Supervisor / Scientific Evidence Officer (S.E.O.) | Ivan Yeung | | Kevin Cheng | | | | |
| Forensic Supervisor / Scientific Evidence Officer (S.E.O.) | Paul Yau | | | Ram Chiang | | | |
| Forensic Supervisor / Scientific Evidence Officer (S.E.O.) | Shui Wai-ming (Queen) | | | | Alice Chan | | |
| Forensic Supervisor / Scientific Evidence Officer (S.E.O.) | Ocean Lam | | | | William Chu | | |
| Forensic Supervisor / Scientific Evidence Officer (S.E.O.) | Charm Ting | | | | Fred Cheng | Fred Cheng | |
| Forensic Supervisor / Scientific Evidence Officer (S.E.O.) | Cheung Sai-hei | | | | | Matthew Ko | |
| Forensic Supervisor / Scientific Evidence Officer (S.E.O.) | Fong Hoi-yan | | | | | | Joey Thye |
| Forensic Technician | Lam Ting-ting | Linda Chung | Linda Chung | | | | |
| Forensic Technician | Leung Siu-kong | Fred Cheng | Fred Cheng | | | | |
| Forensic Technician | Angel Chiang | | | Aimee Chan | | | |
| Forensic Technician | Ken Ho | | | Edwin Siu | | | |
| Forensic Technician | Ching Long | | | | | | Niklas Lam |

=== Kowloon West District Crime Squad (DCS) / Regional Crime Unit (RCU) ===
| Role | Character | Installment | | | | | |
| Role | Character | I | II | III | IV | V | VI |
|---|---|---|---|---|---|---|---|
| Senior Inspector | Nicole Leung | Yoyo Mung | Yoyo Mung | | | | |
| Senior Inspector | Isabella Ma (Bell) | | Charmaine Sheh | | | | |
| Senior Inspector | Ada Ling | | | Kate Tsui | | | |
| Senior Inspector | Kwok Fai-wong (King Sir) | | | | Shaun Tam | | |
| Senior Inspector | Cheng Ho-yin | | | | | Benjamin Yuen | Benjamin Yuen |
| Sergeant | Sum Hung | Raymond Cho | Raymond Cho | | | | |
| Sergeant | Lee Chin-fung (Wind) | | | Ron Ng | | | |
| Sergeant | Ko Ching | | | | Rebecca Zhu | | |
| Constable | Fok Bo-ying | | | | | Venus Wong | Venus Wong |

== Viewership ratings ==
| Installment | Episodes | Timeslot | Episode premiere | Episode finale | HK viewers (in millions) | Average rating |
|---|---|---|---|---|---|---|
| I | 25 | Monday – Friday 21:30 | 13 June 2006 | 16 July 2006 | 2.15 | 33.6 |
| II | 30 | Monday – Friday 21:30 | 19 May 2008 | 28 June 2008 | 2.06 | 32.2 |
| III | 30 | Monday – Friday 21:30 | 10 October 2011 | 20 November 2011 | 2.30 | 36 |
| IV | 30 | Monday – Friday 20:30 | 17 February 2020 | 27 March 2020 | | 36.3 |
