= List of Forensic Heroes IV characters =

Forensic Heroes IV is a 2020 police procedural television drama and the fourth installment of the Forensic Heroes series. Produced by Television Broadcasts Limited (TVB), Mui Siu-ching serves as the drama's executive producer. The drama closely follows a team of professionals of the Forensic Science and Forensic Pathology departments who work closely with the Kowloon West Regional Crime Unit to crack cases.

== Forensic Science Division ==
=== Ko On ===
- Portrayed by Raymond Wong
- Episodes: 01 — 30

Dr. Ko On (高安) is a Senior Chemist and the laboratory supervisor from the Forensic Science Division of the Hong Kong General Laboratory. When he was twelve, Ko On witnessed his younger sister, Ko Sin, being abducted, and his mother died in a taxi crash while running after to save her.

Ko On was determined to look for his lost sister and has a close relationship with his youngest sister, Ko Ching. He had known Dr. Man, who is his best friend and neighbour, for years. He is also King Sir's good friend. Ko On, Dr. Man and King Sir cooperate to crack cases with their professional teams.

In episode 14, he learnt about how Ko Sin was abducted twenty three years ago from Chris, who was forced to take part in the abduction, and decided to forgive her, considering her to be a victim as well.

Ko On originally had a steady relationship with his girlfriend, Monique, though they break up in episode 20 as Monique chose to accompany her first love to the end of his life.

In episode 25, Ko On learnt about Ko Sin's whereabouts from Chris and reunited with her in episode 26. He became Chris’ boyfriend in the final episode.

=== Shui Wai-ming ===
- Portrayed by Alice Chan
- Episodes: 01 — 30

Shui Wai-ming (水慧明), better known as Queen, is a Scientific Evidence Officer (SEO) from the Forensic Science Division of the Hong Kong General Laboratory. Her father was an Inspector of Police, who perished in the line of duty when she was young. She is Dr. Man, Ko Ching and Monique's good friend.

Queen became close with King Sir due to their consistent cooperation at work. In episode 16, she found out that her boyfriend, Louis, and her best friend, Elaine, had a one night stand so she broke up with him. In episode 21, Louis was killed and Queen was accused as the murder suspect.

Thanks to King Sir's support and encouragement, she was able to bestir herself, and they became close friends and each other's ‘tree hole’. However, even though she knew King Sir has feelings for her, she did not accept his confession for fear of losing him, like how she once lost her father. They became an actual couple in the final episode.

=== Charm Ting ===
- Portrayed by Fred Cheng
- Episodes: 01-08, 11, 14-28, 30-present

Charm Ting (湛霆) is a Scientific Evidence Officer (SEO) from the Forensic Science Division of the Hong Kong General Laboratory. He sees Ko On as his idol and becomes close friend with his youngest sister, Ko Ching. Charm Ting has a crush on her, though he doesn't have the courage to confess to her. They became a couple in the final episode.

== Forensic Pathology Division ==
=== Man Ka-hei ===
- Portrayed by Selena Lee
- Episodes: 01 — 30

Dr. Man Ka-hei (聞家希), better known as Dr. Man, is a Senior Forensic Pathologist from the Forensic Pathology Division of the Hong Kong General Laboratory. Dr. Man had a close relationship with her elder sister. Her sister died due to an air crash. Dr. Man followed her sister's dream to be a forensic pathologist and gradually developed passion for her career.

Dr. Man had known Ko On, who is her best friend and neighbour, for years. She is also King Sir's good friend. The three cooperate to crack cases with their professional teams. She is Queen, Ko Ching and Monique's good friend as well.

In episode 9, Dr. Man met her deceased sister's boyfriend, Stan, again and they become close friends. Later, Stan confessed to her. However, she was unable to figure out if he really had feelings for her or he only saw her as her sister's replacement. Therefore, she didn't accept his confession immediately. They became a couple in episode 27.

== Kowloon West Regional Crime Unit (RCU) ==
=== Kwok Fai-wong ===
- Portrayed by Shaun Tam
- Episodes: 01 — 30

Senior Inspector (SIP) Kwok Fai-wong (郭輝煌), better known as King Sir, is the head of the Kowloon West Regional Crime Unit with high case closure rate.

When King Sir was young, he watched waves with his brother-in-law at the seaside during a typhoon and accidentally fell into the sea. Although he managed to survive, his brother-in-law lost his life for trying to save him. Therefore, his elder sister had a distant relationship with him and he had been feeling guilty for his sister and niece. He rents out his flat to earn school fees for his niece to study abroad. The siblings eventually reconcile in episode 27.

King Sir is Ko On and Dr. Man's good friend, and cooperates with them to crack cases with their professional teams. He became close with Queen due to their consistent cooperation at work. King Sir comforts and provides support when Queen was at her low ebb. The two became close friends and each other's ‘tree hole’. King Sir gradually develops feelings for Queen and confessed to her in episode 29. However, she did not accept his confession immediately for fear of losing him, like how she once lost her father. They became an actual couple in the final episode.

=== Ko Ching ===
- Portrayed by Rebecca Zhu
- Episodes: 01 — 30

Sergeant (WSGT) Ko Ching (高靖) is a RCU sergeant. She has a close relationship with her elder brother, Ko On, and respects her supervisor, King Sir. She is also Dr. Man, Queen, and Monique's good friend.

Ko Ching's elder sister, Ko Sin, was abducted when she was young. Therefore, she became a policewoman and was determined to look for her lost sister. Despite her young age at the time of her sister's abduction, she held on to the hopes that one day, they could all be together again. In episode 26, she reunited with her sister. She became Charm Ting's girlfriend in the final episode.

== Notable characters ==
=== Chris Tsui ===
- Portrayed by Roxanne Tong
- Episodes: 02-07, 10-21, 25, 27, 29-30

Chris Tsui Yi (徐意) is an online news reporter, who occasionally provides clues for case investigations.

Chris’ parents died from a car crash when she was a child. She then lived with her uncle and aunt from her mother's side, who forced her to take part in child abduction. Chris had been feeling guilty for what she was forced to do. Therefore, she became a righteous reporter and hopes to look for clues of the abducted children.

Ko On's younger sister, Ko Sin, was one of the abducted children. Chris managed to find Ko On, and finally had the courage to tell him about what happened on the day Ko Sin was abducted in episode 14. It turned out she had used a lollipop to lure Ko Sin. She apologised to Ko On and his family, returned the barrette Ko Sin gave her, and received his forgiveness.

In episode 25, her friend Paul managed to trace Ko Sin's whereabouts to an orphanage in San Francisco. Chris told Ko On about the news and Ko Sin contacted him to meet up. She had a crush on Ko On and became his girlfriend in the final episode.

=== Stan Sze ===
- Portrayed by Gabriel Harrison
- Episodes: 09-11, 15, 21-23, 25-30

Stan Sze Kin-yin (施見賢) is a voiceprint expert who occasionally assists in case investigations with his expertise. In episode 9, Stan returned to Hong Kong and met Dr. Man, his deceased girlfriend's younger sister, who reminds him of his deceased girlfriend, and enjoys spending time with her.

Later, he confessed to Dr. Man. However, she was unable to figure out if he really had feelings for her or he only saw her as her sister's replacement. Therefore, she didn't accept his confession immediately. They became a couple in episode 27.

=== Supporting characters ===
- William Chu as Ocean Lam Hoi-shun (林凱淳), a Science Evidence Officer (SEO) from the Forensic Science Division of the Hong Kong General Laboratory.
- Terrence Huang as Howard Chan Ho-wing (陳浩榮), a forensic technician from the Forensic Science Division of the Hong Kong General Laboratory.
- Fred Cheung as Ivan Szeto Fun (司徒勳), a forensic pathologist from the Forensic Pathology Division of the Hong Kong General Laboratory.
- Arnold Kwok as Yu Wai-ding (余偉鼎), an officer of the Kowloon West Regional Crime Unit.
- Fei Wu as Mok King-chiu / Super (莫敬超), an officer of the Kowloon West Regional Crime Unit.
- Wiyona Yeung as Tong Sum-yuet (唐心悅), an officer of the Kowloon West Regional Crime Unit.

== Recurring Characters ==
=== Case 1 (Episodes 1–4) ===
- Patrick Tse as Long Siu-tin (龍兆天), the founder of a famous Cantonese Opera troupe and Long Yiu-chong's father. He is Long Ying-suet's master and has a close relationship with her. Although their relationship worsened due to a series of deaths of the members of the troupe, they were able to reconcile with each other at the end. Before returning to Canada, he sold his house in Hong Kong to set up a fund and sponsored Long Ying-suet.
  (Cameo appearance)
- Michelle Yim as Long Ying-suet (龍映雪), a famous Cantonese Opera actress and the leader of the Cantonese Opera troupe. She is Long Siu-tin's apprentice and has a close relationship with him. Although their relationship worsened because of a series of death of the members of the troupe, they were able to reconcile with each other at the end. Eventually, she left the troupe and became a Cantonese Opera teacher. (Cameo appearance)
- Pinky Cheung as Cheung Shuk-man (張淑敏), Long Ying-suet's assistant. She told Wong Shing-hong that Wong Lap-keung gave AIDS to his mother. She did this hoping Wong Shing-hong would seek revenge against his father. She was charged with abetting to murder.
- Man Yeung as Wong Lap-keung (黃立強), the music conductor of the Cantonese Opera troupe, who killed Long Yiu-chong as he threatened to exposed that he was infected with AIDS. He is Ho Sau-lai's husband and was used to abused her. He was eventually killed by his son.
- Leslie Ka as Long Yiu-chong (龍耀中), Long Siu-tin's illegitimate son. He was stabbed by Ching Kuai-hing and killed by Wong Lap-keung.
- Rosanne Lui as Ching Kuai-hing (程貴卿), Long Yong-suet's assistant and Ting Siu-ying's mother. After knowing Long Yiu-chong was the one who lead to her daughter's death, she stabbed him but failed to kill him.
- Edith Au as Ho Sau-lai (何秀麗), Wong Lap-keung's wife and Wong Shing-hong's mother. She was a victim of domestic violence.
- Andy Lin as Wong Shing-hong (黃誠康), Wong Lap-keung and Ho Sau-lai's son. He had a close relationship with his mother and hated his father for abusing her, eventually killing him.
- Helen Ng as Siu Kuai-kwan (蕭桂群), Ho Bo's assistant.
- Wan Yuk-yu as Ho Bo (何寶), an actor of the Cantonese Opera troupe, who accidentally drank poisoned tea for Long Yiu-chong and died.
- Au Ming Miu as Ting Siu-ying (丁小盈), Ching Kuai-hing's daughter, who committed suicide after being raped by Long Yiu-chong sixteen years ago.

=== Case 2 (Episodes 4–8) ===
- Sharon Luk as Scarlett Yan Hong (殷紅), an actress and Kelvin's wife.
- Bob Cheung as Chan Sum (陳森), Chu Hoi-chun's best friend. He killed Kelvin and Chiu Kit-yu. In the end, his ex-girlfriend visits him behind bars and reveals that Chu Hoi-chun raped her multiple times in 2011.
- Stefan Wong as Kelvin Ho Chi-yiu (何志堯), a jewellery merchant, Scarlett's husband and Chiu Kit-yu's lover. He killed Chu Hoi-chun, who blackmailed him to reveal that he bought over Au Sai-wo and his gang to kill his father. He was later killed by Chan Sum after the latter knowing that he killed his best friend.
- Alan Wan as Chu Hoi-chun (朱海川), Chan Sum's best friend and a gangster, who killed Au Sai-wo and his gang in 2011. Eventually, he was beaten to death with a wine glass by Kelvin after blackmailing him.
- Jan Tse as Chiu Kit-yu (趙潔如), Chiu Wing-sau's daughter and Kelvin's lover. She was killed by Chan Sum.
- Tse Ho-yat as Au Sai-wo (歐世和), a gangster who was bought over to kill Ho Hing-sang in 2011 and was eventually killed by Chu Hoi-chun.
- Yip Ka-wang as Chan Ka-yau (陳家佑), a gangster under Au Sai-wo. He was bought over to kill Ho Hing-sang and was eventually killed by Chu Hoi-chun.
- Tsang Hoi-cheung as Cheung Hoi-chu (張海柱), a gangster under Au Sai-wo. He was bought over to kill Ho Hing-sang and was eventually killed by Chu Hoi-chun.
- Wong Chi-wing as Ho Hing-sang (何慶生), a jewellery merchant and Kelvin's father, who was killed in 2011 by Au Sai-wo and his gang, who was bought over by Kelvin.
- Kwan Wai-lun as Chiu Wing-sau (趙永壽), Chiu Kit-yu's father.

=== Case 3 (Episodes 8–10) ===
- Yumiko Cheng as Monique Hau Man-li (侯敏莉), a sommelier and was framed for seducing Lai Chun-Yu.
- Bond Chan as Lai Chun-yu (黎駿宇), the CEO of a company, who made a video to frame Monique for seducing him.
- Keith Mok as Martin Mok Siu-wah (莫少華), Lai Chun-Yu's assistant, who made a video to framed Monique for seducing Lai Chun-Yu.
- Gabriel Harrison as Stan Sze Kin-yin (施見賢), a voiceprint expert who proved the sound of the video was fake.

=== Case 4 (Episodes 11–14) ===
- Eva Lai as Chiu Choi-lan (趙彩蘭), Choi Bak-lun and Chow Ho's mother. She made faked news with Tam Yi-kiu years ago in order to defraud welfare. She reunited with Chow Ho and mistakenly thought he was Choi Bak-lun. After finding out his true identity, she attempted to commit suicide with him, but failed. She eventually accepted him as her son.
- Yeung Chiu-hoi as Chow Ho (鄒浩), Chiu Choi-lan's son and is mentally disabled due to incest.
- Jerry Ku as Tam Yi-kiu (譚以喬), the chief editor of an online news company, who made fake news with Chiu Choi-lan and killed Choi Bak-lun years ago.
- Li Lung-kay as Wu Cheuk-hang (胡卓亨), a blind photographer.
- Leung Ho-wai as Choi Bak-lun (蔡伯麟), Chiu Choi-lan's son and was mentally disabled. He got lost twenty three years ago and his body was eventually found in cement. He was actually killed by Tam Yi-kiu, who buried his body in his cement.
- George Ng as Chiu Choi-lan's elder brother, who raped her years ago. He was Chow Ho's father and had died.

=== Case 5 (Episodes 15–18) ===
- Nicole Wu as Lo Hau-ying (盧巧瑩), a bank manager, Lo Hau-tak's younger sister, Poon Man-leung's girlfriend and Ching To's friend. She was suffering from bipolar disorder. She had been taking psilocybin mushroom without knowing, which aggravated her illness, eventually causing her to wrap a plastic bag around her head and died of suffocation.
- Brian Chu as Poon Man-leung (潘文亮), Lo Hau-ying's boyfriend. (Cameo appearance)
- Carlo Ng as Lo Hau-tak (盧孝達), a businessman, Lo Hau-ying's elder brother and Ching To's boyfriend. He instigated Ching To to add psilocybin mushroom to Lo Hau-ying's breakfast constantly, indirectly leading to her death, so he could get her insurance money.
- Osanna Chiu as Ching To (程淘), a bank clerk, Lo Hau-ying's friend and Lo Hau-tak's girlfriend. She added psilocybin mushroom to Lo Hau-ying's breakfast constantly, indirectly leading to her death.
- Lily Li as Ching To's grandmother.
- Kinlas Chan as Wong Long-luk (黃朗祿), an A&E doctor and Dr. Man's good friend. He died in an explosion caused by a drone bomb.
- Otto Chan as Leung Yik-hon (梁奕漢), who killed Wong Long-luk and attempted to kill Dr. Man with drone bombs.
- Selena Lee as Man Ka-hei (聞家希), better known as Dr. Man, Wong Long-luk's good friend, who uses herself to lure Leung Yik-hon.

=== Case 6 (Episodes 19–21) ===
- Freeyon Chung as Cheuk Nam (卓南), a junkyard worker. He had fought with Lip Ching-wang, shot him with a gun and escaped. He died from serious internal bleeding and his body was found in a car on a slope.
- Lucas Yiu as Lip Ching-wang (聶正弘), a staff of a shoe shop, part-time security of a junkyard and Yiu Yat-tung's friend. He had fought with Cheuk Nam and was shot by him. He was found dead with his body hung outside the trunk of a dangling scrap car.
- Dickson Wong as Yiu Yat-tung (姚逸桐), a junkyard worker and Lip Ching-wang's friend.
- Keefe Ng as Chak Ka-hin (翟家軒), a junkyard worker. He incited Cheuk Nam to kill Lip Ching-wang.

=== Case 7 (Episodes 21–23) ===
- Alice Chan as Shui Wai-ming (水慧明), better known as Queen, Elaine's best friend and Louis's girlfriend. After finding out that Louis and Elaine cheat on her, she broke up with him. Later, she found him dead at his home.
- Akina Hong as Elaine Cheung Yee-ling (張綺寧), a clerk and Queen's best friend, who had a one night stand with Louis. She injected vecuronium bromide into Louis's body, causing him to have difficulty in moving.
- Timothy Cheng as Dr. Louis Ho Lap-wai (賀立維), a Principal Dental Officer and Queen's boyfriend (later ex-boyfriend as she found out that he had a one night stand with Elaine). He was injected with vecuronium bromide by Elaine, causing him to have difficulty in moving. He was Ng Yui-kwong's friend and was later injected with succinylcholine by him, causing him to die from suffocation.
- Lam King-kong as Dr. Ng Yui-kwong (伍睿廣), an aesthetic doctor. He was Louis’ friend and injected succinylcholine in his body to kill him due to financial disputes.

=== Case 8 (Episodes 23–24) ===
- Mak ling-ling as Principal Mak (麥校長), the principal of Tak Bo Secondary School.
  (Cameo appearance)
- Chan Wan-huen as Hui Wing-chi (許穎芝), a Form 3 student from Tak Bo Secondary School and a triathlete who suffered from rape trauma syndrome.
- Strawberry Yeung as Poon Cheuk-fei (潘卓菲), Hui Wing-chi's mother who forced her head into water with excess arsenic, causing her to die from secondary drowning.
- Savio Tsang as Koo Wing-kin (顧永健), Hui Wing-chi's triathlon coach and had indecently assaulted her.

=== Case 9 (Episodes 25–30) ===
- Kelly Cheung as Emma Ma Oi-mei / Ko Sin (馬愛薇 / 高善), a flight attendant and part-time model. She is Ko On's long lost younger sister and Ko Ching's long lost elder sister. After being abducted and sold to a human trafficking group, she was adopted by an orphanage in San Francisco. She was eventually adopted by Michael Ma's parents and became his adoptive younger sister. When she saw that Michael Ma had purchased a knife, she made a false confession, claiming she had killed Law Ching-sau, Lee Chau and Dr. Sammy Nam Ka-mei elder sister. Ko On proved that she was lying to protect Michael Ma.
- Sharon Chan as Dr. Sammy Nam Ka-mei (藍嘉美), a psychologist who has dissociative identity disorder after her elder sister was killed ten years ago.
- Jonathan Cheung as Michael Ma, a popular YouTuber and Emma's adopted elder brother. He is revealed to be the killer of Lee Chau & Law Ching-sau. He also killed Sammy's sister ten years ago. In the end, he commits suicide.
- Fanny Lee as Sharon Lee Wai-chu (李惠珠), Yuen Dong-loi's wife and was killed by Sammy. Michael Ma bought a knife to kill her but Sammy was a step ahead of him.
- Chan Wing-cheung as Yuen Dong-loi (袁東來), a businessman and was killed by Sammy.
- Helena Law as Chiu Suk-kuen (趙淑娟), Law Ching-sau's mother.
- Marine Lee Yee Man as Law Ching-sau (羅清秀), the boss of a public relations company and was later killed by Michael.
- Susan Tse as Lee Chau (李秋), who had previously worked in Dr. Man's family. She was killed by Michael as she witnessed him killing Law Ching-sau.

== See also ==
- Forensic Heroes IV
