= List of Forensic Heroes III characters =

Forensic Heroes III is a 2011 police procedural television drama serial set and filmed in Hong Kong. Produced by Television Broadcasts Limited (TVB), Mui Siu-ching serves as the drama's executive producer with Choi Ting-ting and Leung Man-wah as the executive writers and editors. The drama closely follows a team of technicians and professionals from the Forensic Science and Forensic Pathology departments of the Hong Kong General Laboratory. Working closely with the Kowloon West District Crime Unit, they use high modern technology and scientific analyses to solve crime. Forensic Heroes III is a reboot of the Forensic Heroes franchise, which was in turn inspired by Hong Kong's 2002 costume drama Witness to a Prosecution and the CBS on-going television series CSI: Crime Scene Investigation.

== Forensic Science Division ==
=== Jack Po ===
- Portrayed by Wayne Lai
- Episodes: 01—present

Dr. Jack Po Kwok-tung (布國棟), better known as Pro Sir, is a Senior Chemist and the laboratory supervisor from the Forensic Science Division of the Hong Kong General Laboratory. Before becoming a chemist, he worked as a Firearms Analyst at the Forensic Firearms Examination Bureau. He lives with his father Shun-hing, his wife Eva Chow, and their daughter Ka-man. Pro Sir is extremely close friends with Mandy Chung, a senior pathologist under the Forensic Pathology Division. Due to their similar personalities and interests, the two share impeccable chemistry at work.

Pro Sir comes from a single-parent household. His mother died young, and his father worked as a massage therapist with low pay, who spent all of the money he earned to Pro Sir's education. Through Pro Sir's hard work and intelligence, he got accepted to one of the most prestigious colleges in the world. His father's strong sense of justice influenced Pro Sir to be a forensic chemist. Pro Sir is educated and consistently receives learning in many other professional subjects such as firearms forensic. His knowledge earns him the nickname "the human encyclopedia" by his co-workers and friends. Courteous and polite, Pro Sir is outgoing and is friends with a lot of people in the forensic department.

Later, due to their disagreements, he gets divorced with Eva, and eventually develops a relationship with Mandy Chung.

=== Angel Chiang ===
- Portrayed by Aimee Chan
- Episodes: 01–29

Angel Chiang Cheuk-kwan (蔣卓君) is a Forensic Technician from the Forensic Science Division of the Hong Kong General Laboratory. Angel is a Chinese American, and previously worked in New York City, United States as crime scene investigator (CSI). Angel decided to work in Hong Kong after she lost out to a less-outstanding Caucasian co-worker in a promotion opportunity, believing that her loss was due to racial discrimination by the review board. After joining the Forensic Science Division of the HK Police Department, Angel often complains of her "boring" work in Hong Kong, where she is unable to use a gun or get hands-on crime solving experience like New York. Ken Ho takes pleasure in frequently reminding Angel that she's in Hong Kong and must follow Hong Kong's rules, often annoying Angel.

Through their constant bickering, Angel and Ken eventually become close partners at work. Ken also gives Angel her first kiss on the lips. In Episode 8, Angel accidentally spills coffee on herself and is forced to wash up in the Gents, as the Ladies was under maintenance. Ken barges in by accident and sees a near topless Angel. That following night, Angel mistakenly thinks Ken was talking about their restroom encounter to their colleagues, and decides to spike Ken's drink with some Long Island Iced Tea to get him intoxicated. Ken gets drunk and kisses Angel on the lips.

Angel and Ken started dating and was thinking of going on a vacation. Angel was shot in episode 29 and died in episode 30.

=== Ken Ho ===
- Portrayed by Edwin Siu
- Episodes: 01—present

Ken Ho Ching-man (何正民) is a Forensic Technician from the Forensic Science Division of the Hong Kong General Laboratory. He has a master's degree in forensic chemistry and has an interest in computer technology. He is self-disciplined, articulate, and has strong work ethic. Ken gets rather annoyed with Angel Chiang, a new addition to the forensics team, who often finds Hong Kong forensic work as "boring" in comparison to those in New York City, where she used to work as a crime scene investigator (CSI).

Ken has extremely low alcohol tolerance and goes on dangerous "kissing sprees" when he gets drunk. As a result, Ken never orders alcoholic drinks to avoid embarrassment and upsetting others. In Episode 8, Ken accidentally saw a near topless Angel while she was washing her shirt in the men's restroom. That night Angel, who mistakenly thought Ken was talking about their restroom encounter to others, spiked Ken's drink with some Long Island Iced Tea. Ken immediately got drunk and kissed Angel on the lips.

Later, Ken started to have feelings for Angel. When Angel told him she was intending to move to New York City, Ken employed various stratagems to make her stay. Finally, he took her to a bar and confessed his love to Angel, and they eventually become a couple.

== Forensic Pathology Division ==
=== Mandy Chung ===
- Portrayed by Maggie Cheung Ho-yee
- Episodes: 01—present

Dr. Mandy Chung Hok-sum (鍾學心) is a Senior Forensic Pathologist from the Forensic Pathology Division of the Hong Kong General Laboratory. She is best friends with Pro Sir and Ada Ling, who is also her roommate. Mandy is extremely committed to her work as a pathologist. Like Pro Sir, she has a strong sense of righteousness and justice, and the two often collaborate to solve crimes together. They become extremely close friends and share impeccable chemistry at work.

Mandy's interest and talent in the sciences have been apparent since youth. Her father was a well-known college science professor and her mother was a doctor. Mandy is extremely close to her grandfather Bok-si, who raised her after her parents died. Since youth, Mandy has an obsession with the Sherlock Holmes series and is especially impressed with the chapter where a Chinese medical expert uses medicine and technology to solve a crime, sparking her interest in becoming a forensic pathologist. Mandy's innate curiosity, intelligence, and persistence were key characteristics that helped her become one of the two only female forensic pathologists in Hong Kong.

Mandy's grandfather constantly invites her to matchmaking dinners, causing her friends to joke that Mandy has an obsession with men. She later meets Jim Fong, a clinical psychologist, through one of her grandfather's matchmaking dinners. They are mutually attracted to each other and become a couple.

Jim moves to Canada, and wants to take Mandy with him. Mandy stays, and Jim and her decide to be good friends. While Jim left, Mandy have feelings for Pro Sir, and they eventually become a couple.

== Kowloon West District Crime Squad (DCS) ==
=== Ada Ling ===
- Portrayed by Kate Tsui
- Episodes 01—present

Senior Inspector (SIP) Ada Ling Sin-yee (凌倩兒) is the head of the Kowloon West District Crime Squad. She is best friends with Mandy Chung, who is also her roommate. Ada possesses outstanding leadership qualities and maintains friendly relations with her subordinate officers. She is especially close with Wind, and often partners up with him when doing field work. They end up becoming a perfect pair after pretending to be together to stop Ko Sir from liking Ada.

Ada comes from a single-parent household and is raised by her mother. Her mother dislikes her working in the police force and often comes up with excuses for Ada to quit. However, through Ada's consistency and high case closure rate, her mother slowly begins to accept Ada's career.

=== Lee Chin-fung ===
- Portrayed by Ron Ng
- Episodes: 01—present

Sergeant (SGT) Lee Chin-fung (李展風), better known as Wind, is a DCS sergeant who usually partners up with Ada Ling on the field. Before he joined the DCS, Wind was a trained SDU paramilitary officer, and is extremely experienced with combat. He is also a karate expert and participates in annual contests.

Wind comes from a wealthy family that owns an international business. He has no interest in working in the business sector and decides to follow his dream of becoming a police officer, much to his family's disappointment. Due to Wind's humble personality and modest behaviour, none of his teammates know about his wealth. In episode 7, Wind lent HK$100,000 to Chan, who was troubling over his sister's college tuition, without hesitation. In later episodes, he becomes Ada Ling's boyfriend.

== Notable characters ==
=== Eva Chow ===
- Portrayed by Nancy Wu
- Episodes: 03–14, 25–28

Eva Chow Yik-fei (周奕霏) is a defense barrister. She lives with her husband Pro Sir, their daughter Man-man, and her father-in-law Shun-hing. Eva is ambitious, confident, and extremely self-assured of her abilities. She is extremely strict but also loving on her daughter, and takes an effort at obtaining the best education for Ka-man.

Eva earning the title as "Long-winning General" by friends and colleagues because she has never lost one single case at court. Pro Sir begins to take notice of Eva's calculating and cunning behavior when Eva was the defense barrister for Amanda Cheung Mei-fan but she overheard Pro-Sir conversation with Ada and she decided to make her to suffer an allergic reaction to miss her lawyer appointment for Amanda Cheung which led Amanda dismiss Eva as her defense barrister which causes Pro Sir to doubt her as he overheard Mandy recalling Eva ordering some dessert that she is allergic to; but he was proven when Eva employed to be the defense barrister of Wilson Yu, a wealthy businessman sued for murder. Eva is willing to overstep boundaries and procedures to ensure that she keeps her long-winning title. Because of her willingness to cross the line, she decides that she and her husband have grown too far apart and have deferring opinions. She files for divorce and takes up a position as a corporate lawyer for a wealthy business man in America, leaving Pro Sir and Ka-man behind in episode 14. She returned at the end of episode 25 but was later found dead at the end of episode 28.

=== Jim Fong ===
- Portrayed by Ruco Chan
- Episodes: 05, 07, 09, 12–14, 17–20

Jim Fong Sai-yau (方世友) is a clinical psychologist. He became Mandy Chung's boyfriend after meeting her through a matchmaking dinner arranged by Mandy's grandfather, who is also Jim's hiking buddy. After the case of his missing brother, Jay, was solved, he broke up with Mandy stating that he was not prepared to be Mandy's Mr. Right. After that, he went abroad furthering his studies.

=== Supporting characters ===
- Ram Chiang as Paul Yau Kin-po (游健保), a Scientific Evidence Officer (SEO) from the Forensic Science Division of the Hong Kong General Laboratory.
- Yuen Wah as Po Shun-hing (布順興), Pro Sir's father.
- Chow Chung as Chung Pok-sze (鍾博史), Mandy's grandfather.
- Mary Hon as Cheung Fung-ping (張鳳萍), Ada's mother.
- Jim Tang as Lam Hong-chan (林康贊), an officer from the Kowloon West District Crime Squad.
- Sammy Sum as Lai Ming-wai (黎明偉), an officer from the Kowloon West District Crime Squad.
- Otto Chan as Wu Sin-hang (胡善行), an officer from the Kowloon West District Crime Squad.
- Jess Sum as Lee Ka-lo / Calorie (李嘉露), an officer from the Kowloon West District Crime Squad.
- Geoffrey Wong as CIP Jason Ko Wai-hung (高偉雄), the Chief Inspector from the Kowloon West District Crime Squad.
- Ronald Law as Sunny Suen Ka-hin (孫嘉軒), a probationary forensic pathologist mentored by Mandy.
- Yeung Chiu-hoi as Gary Leung Tsz-ho (梁子豪), a forensic technician from the Forensic Science department of the Hong Kong General Laboratory.
- Brian Tse as Lawrence Yuen Chi-hung (阮志雄), a forensic technician from the Forensic Science department of the Hong Kong General Laboratory.
- Stanley Cheung as Eric Lau Man-kit (劉文傑), a forensic technician from the Forensic Science department of the Hong Kong General Laboratory.
- Aurora Li as Rosie Wong Shuk-yu (黃淑如), a forensic technician from the Forensic Science department of the Hong Kong General Laboratory.
- Moon Chan as Po Ka-man (布家雯), Pro Sir and Eva's young daughter.
- Brian Chu as Simon Yau Chun-kit (游俊傑), Paul's teenage son and a medical student.

== Recurring characters ==
=== Case 1 (Episodes 1–3) ===
- Lai Lok-yi as Vic Mak Wing-fu (麥永富), the owner of a small financial investment company. Later on, he was revealed to be a gay couple with Vincent who only married Ann for her money. After the failed wedding, he used Ann's nude pictures to blackmail Cho King-tim for money. Even though what he did wasn't against the law, he reaped what he sowed for cheating Ann's feelings when his face got scarred by broken glass as he fell down the stairs after failing to attain a client.
- Lau Dan as Cho King-tim (曹景添), a rich businessman who is Ann's father. Ann was his only daughter whom he loved dearly. At the wedding, he became enraged upon discovering that Vic was homosexual showing that he had no affection for daughter. Despite this, he felt too embarrassed to tell his daughter, knowing that she wouldn't believe his statements about Vic. He secretly placed his pills in orange juice that was planned for Vic to drink. Knowing that Vic was diabetic, the pills that contained potassium were meant to make him feel unwell, so that the wedding could be called off, yet Ann ended up drinking it instead. During the shooting, he grabbed a random gun on impulse and tried to fire it at Vic, only for the bullet to deflect off a pot ornament and it Ann instead, killing her. Later, he stabbed Vic for trying to extort money from him upon learning of Vic's intentions to publicize his sexual interactions with Ann and to slander her reputations, resulting in him jumping off the 3rd floor and accusing Vic of shoving him off the building.
- Christine Kuo as Ann Cho Lai-mei (曹麗美), Cho King-tim's only daughter and Vic's fiancé. She truly loved Vic and was only concerned about how he was during the shooting. In her attempt to reach Vic, she was hit by the deflected bullet, which was accidentally fired by her father in his attempt to kill her fiancé, who was manipulating Ann the entire time.
- Vin Choi as Vincent Choi Chun (蔡俊), the Best Man at Ann and Vic's wedding, who was revealed to be Vic's boyfriend in Episode 2.
- Law Tin-chee as Cheung Chi-wai (張志威), a robber and an assassin.
- Ho Wai-yip as Officer Fong Man-sing (方文星), an "off-duty" police officer attending the wedding. Shot and killed Mok Ho-leung
- Shiu Cheuk-yiu as Mok Ho-leung (莫浩良), a robber and assassin who and is presumed to be the killer at the wedding. He was killed by Officer Fong in a gun battle.
- Mandy Lam as Wong Cheung-ling (王長玲), Mok Ho-leung's girlfriend.
- Kelvin Leung as Wong Cheung-chi (王長志), Ling's younger brother and an amateur sushi chef.
- Janice Shum as Linda Chin Shuk-yin (錢淑妍), the wedding planner.

=== Case 2 (Episodes 3–7) ===
- Cilla Kung as Wong Ka-man (黃嘉敏), a.k.a. Third Eye Girl or Sky Eye Girl (天眼少女), a teenage girl who is believed to be able to see the future through a scar on her forehead. She actually has autism and is being manipulated by Rev Luminous.
- Joseph Lee as Luk Tsan-kwong (陸振光), a.k.a. Rev Luminous (光明居士), a metaphysical expert who also serves as the Sky Eye Girl's manager and guardian. He is a con-artist who makes use of Sky Eye Girl in order to earn money by claiming that she has magical abilities. He raped Shum Pak-chi and Wong Ka-man, causing the latter to be impregnated when she was 12.
- Cheung Kwok Keung as Eddie Kam Tai-yam (金大任), a feng shui master. He had an affair with Cheung Mei Fan and followed her orders to murder Adrian Kwok.
- Rachel Kan as Amanda Cheung Mei-fan (張美芬), the wife of rich businessman Adrian Kwok. Instructed Eddie to murder Adrian Kwok.
- Tang Ying-man as Adrian Kwok Fu-wah (郭富華), a rich businessman. Murdered by Eddie.
- Samantha Ko as Tracy Lam Yuen-yuen (林圓圓), a public relations manager at Kwok's company. She had an affair with Adrian Kwok.
- Eric Li as Chow Wing-keung (周永強), the boyfriend of Shum Pak-chi. He attempted to murder Rev Luminous for revenge but failed.
- Au Hoi-ling as Lee Yuet-ngor (李月娥), the mother of Shum Pak-chi. She tried to frame Rev Luminous' by eating rat poison along with his holy mantou.
- Judy Tsang as Shum Pak-chi (沈柏芝), the deceased daughter of Lee Yuet-ngor. She was raped by Luk Tsan-kwong and killed herself.

=== Case 3 (Episodes 7–9) ===
- Kwok Fung as Fung Chor-kau (馮初九), also known as Chairman Kau (九主席), one of Tsui Sai-tat's tenants. Due to Tsui's disappearance twenty years prior, Chairman Kau and two other tenants have been requesting for adverse possession for the ownership of Tsui's broken-down flat, which will soon be torn down by the government. All 3 tenants were charged with unlawful disposal of Tsui Sai-tat's dead body. They wanted to dispose of the body in secrecy so no one would ever knew that he came back to claim the house. This would enable all 3 of them to successfully claim adverse possession. All 3 of them became suspects to the murder case and they started to accuse each other out of desperacy for a lighter sentence. However, one thing that they all agreed on was that the lights in their respective apartments flickered at 8pm on the night of the murder.
- Henry Lee as Koo Wing-keung (古永強), also known as Stingy (古寒友), one of Tsui Sai-tat's tenants. Along with Chairman Kau and Ming Jeh, he has been requesting for adverse possession for the ownership of Tsui's flat.
- Au Oi-ling as Chan Yuk-ming (陳玉鳴), better known as Sister Ming / Ming Jeh (Ming姐) and ex-prostitute and one of Tsui Sai-tat's tenants. Along with Chairman Kau and Stingy, she has been requesting for adverse possession for the ownership of Tsui's flat. She was the first to discover Tsui Sai-tat's dead body.
- Hui Pik-kei as Auntie Chat (七嬸), one of Tsui Sai-tat's tenants.
- Chan Tik-hak as Tsui Sai-tat (徐世達), who has been missing for twenty years. He went to Brazil because he wanted to get involved with the black market but he made an enemy and accidentally killed him. He was jailed for 20 years which explains his sudden disappearance. He came back to Hong Kong and tried to kick out the 3 tenants. A few days later, his dead body was found in a nylon bag that caught fire at a trash site. In the end, his death was an accident. Due to poor management of the building, he accidentally electrocuted himself and slipped and drowned in the bathtub.
- Alan Wan as Tsui Wing-lap (徐永立), Tsui Sai-tat's nephew.

=== Case 4 (Episodes 9–12) ===
- Cheung Tat-lun as Wilson Yu Chung-kin (余中健), a wealthy businessman who had a sexual relationship with Apple. He forced Apple to take a full bottle of drugs, therefore killing her by accident. After the incident, he fled the scene and accidentally knocked down an elderly lady with his reckless driving. At first, he claimed that he did not kill Apple and she overdosed herself because she didn't know when to stop. However, after forensic evidence proved that he was the murderer, he was instructed by Eva to pretend to commit suicide by banging his head against the cell wall to show his regret. In the end, he was jailed for manslaughter.
- Angel Chiang as Yan Tsz-yu (殷紫如), better known as Apple, a young drug addict, who was killed by Wilson in a hotel.
- Lily Ho as Leung Mei-na (梁美娜), better known as Baby, a young drug addict and Apple's friend. She tried to leave with Apple after seeing that Wilson was going to get her killed by making her eat so much drugs. But both Apple and Wilson pushed her away and told her to leave by herself if she wanted to. Eventually, she left in a rage, accidentally taking away the empty pill bottle that Wilson used to shove drugs down Apple's throat. She was the only eyewitness to Wilson shoving a bottle of pills down Apple's throat.
- Hugo Wong as Benny Chan Cheuk Wah (陳卓華), Wilson Yu's assistant. He took up the blame for Wilson's idea to kidnap Baby so that she wouldn't be able to testify in court.
- Simon Lo as Wong Shek-on (王頌安), a hotel custodian worker. He witnessed Apple trying to escape from Wilson before she died. The next morning, he thought that Apple was asleep so he decided to steal a valuable watch that Wilson left behind.

=== Case 5 (Episode 13 - 16) ===
- Lui Hei as Wu Sai-hang (胡世恆), nicknamed Bus Brother (巴士阿哥). He is a university computer science student, who excels in computer science but lacks social skills. He became infamous for his social problems after a video of him being unable to stand up for himself against an unreasonable woman was posted on the Internet. He was also accused of being a pervert when someone secretly placed a camera inside the women's restroom. A few days later, his corpse was found in a compost bin, attracting many flies at the university.
- Ko Hor-wai as Wu Lok-shan (胡樂珊), Wu Sai-hang's younger sister, who became bitter and unhappy following the "Bus Brother" incident that resulted in the harassment of her brother, their parents, and her herself.
- Ma Koon-tung as Chiu King-Pui, Peter (趙敬培), Wu Sai-hang's roommate, who was one of Wu's only friends, and the main antagonist of the fifth case. They were both computer geeks and he did IT business with Wu. When Wu wanted to break off their business relationship because he knew he was the dominant party and needed enough money to pay for his father's medical fees as the sole breadwinner of his family, this angered Peter as he thought that Christy manipulated Wu into trying to betray him. He even tried to convince him to change his mind, only to get into a fight after Wu realized that Peter was the person who not only posted the "Bus Brother" video on MeTube online, but had also accused Wu of being the peeping tom in their school. This caused Wu to realize that he had been betrayed by the very person he thought was one of the nicest people to be his only friend. The fight eventually resulted in Wu's death at the hands of Peter. After his confession, Wind and Ling explained to Peter that Wu never lied about his father's condition and that Peter's extreme actions have ended up hurting Wu and his family. This causes Peter to realize that Sai-hang never lied about his father sickness, resulting in him shedding a tear at the sheer shock of his actions.
- Brian Chu as Yau Chun-kit, Simon (游俊傑), Yau Kin-Po's son and medical student. He is under great pressure from his father to become a doctor despite his complete lack of interest in the medical field. In order to keep himself awake and away from his troubles, he ended up being on drugs, which caused him to start a fight with a fellow schoolmate. On the night of the murder, he swept the lab experiments off his desk in frustration and ran to the rooftops. He wanted to commit suicide by jumping off the building but Wu Sai-hang, having noticed that something isn't right with Simon, followed him and stopped him from jumping off the building at the last minute before he physically restrained him in order to stop him from trying to commit suicide. After Simon calmed down, he explained to Wu that he wanted to end his own life due to the sheer stress of having to pursue a degree he wasn't interested in. Feeling pity for the poor student, Wu then explained to Simon that there are other opportunities in place of the medical field for him to pursue, even using his own past struggles as an example to illustrate how even in the midst of despair, there would always be a door that would lead to a greater path in life. This is what ultimately convinces Simon to temporarily overcome his depression and to temporarily lower his stress, only for his stress and depression to return upon discovering his savior's corpse in a trash bin the following morning.
- Adrian Chau as Chau Yat-Hei, Oscar (周逸熙), a university marketing student and Ocean's older twin brother, who did IT business with Wu Sai-hang. Not many people can actually tell the difference between both twins, and because of this, Oscar and his younger brother, Ocean, often impersonate each other, especially when Oscar needed to use Ocean to cover up the crimes or mess he commits. He got into a car accident on the day of the murder, yet asked his brother to take up the blame simply because he didn't want to earn demerit points. A week later following the murder Wu, Kelly had indirectly told Oscar that Ocean had slept with her due to thinking that Ocean was her boyfriend, Oscar, at the time, resulting in an enraged and betrayed Oscar assaulting Ocean before the police officers restrain them as the brothers argue, only for Kelly to tell them to shut up as she tearfully realizes that she had been manipulated by the brothers the entire time before breaking up with Oscar.
- Daniel Chau as Chau Zeon-Jyün, Ocean (周俊源), Oscar's younger twin brother. Unlike his brother, he is less intelligent, therefore already having a job in spite of the fact that he and his older twin brother are at the same age. He is shown to be more impulsive than his brother when he got into a fight with Wu Sai-hang for breaking off his older brother's business deal. Prior to the car accident, he was cheating on Oscar with his girlfriend, Kelly, yet his girlfriend didn't know that he had a twin. Ocean slept with Kelly out of vengeance towards his brother for not only looking down on him since childhood, but for also using him as a weapon or shield whenever he runs into trouble, ultimately betraying his brother as a result.
- Sire Ma as Christy, Wu Sai-hung's false girlfriend. She only pretended to take an interest in Wu Sai-hung because she and her boyfriend were on bad terms and she wanted to make her boyfriend jealous. However, Wu Sai-hung thought she genuinely loved him despite his controversies. Furthermore, Christy felt remorse upon learning of Wu's death following the amends she made with her boyfriend (meaning that her manipulation of Wu to spite her own boyfriend ended up being all for nothing), thus going to the chapel to pray for Wu as a form of apology to the late student.

=== Case 6 (Episode 17 - 20) ===
- Calvin Chan as Fong Sai-wing, Jay (方世榮), Fong Sai-yau's younger brother. He was killed by Alex and was buried by Alex and Bowie on an island.
- Ruco Chan as Fong Sai-yau, Jim (方世友), Jay's elder brother and Chung Hok-sum's boyfriend. He was angered by the fact that Jay died a painful death. This anger led to him being impulsive and he tried to set Bowie up in a trap by saying that he had claimed Jay's items. Bowie was worried that he would be traced back to the murder and indeed fell into the trap. However, as Jim couldn't prove that Bowie was the murderer, they got into a fight in the gym locker room. At first, Jim was the prime suspect of Bowie's death but he was soon cleared of suspicion.
- Stephen Huynh as Wu Kai-yan, Alex (胡啟仁), Jay's friend and Michelle's husband. Originally labeled by the police as the Alpha male of the murders, it was soon discovered that Michelle had manipulated him to commit most of the murders. He killed both Jay and Bowie.
- Matthew Ko as Tsang Tsz-wah, Bowie (曾子華), Jay's friend. He was the most worried about the murder, at first he wanted to call the police and confess but Alex persuaded him not to. Alex threw his "Fun Fun Canoe Club" keychain along with Jay's body so that the police would be able to trace the murder to Bowie, which prevented him from confessing. When he knew that the police were going to catch on sooner or later, he asked Alex for a sum of money to flee with Cindy. Alex refused and killed him by accelerating his car into Bowie which threw him into the air and a signboard sliced off his arm.
- Natalie Tong as Cheung Mei-yan, Michelle (張美恩), Jay and Bowie's friend and Alex's wife. A remorseless and manipulative psychopath, she is the main villain behind all of Alex's murders. She puts on an innocent and weak front in front of everyone in order to manipulate her husband into killing those she dislikes. Back then, she accused Jay of trying to rape her which led Alex to kill him on impulse. She also spurred him on to accelerate his car into Bowie. When it was found out that she drew the curtains at Cindy's house before her death, the police arrested her. However, she requested for a lawyer and passed the message to Alex that she was pregnant, leading Alex to take up the blame. However, she wasn't really pregnant and only saw Alex as a tool. When Alex found out that Michelle didn't love him, he told the truth to the police, enabling them to arrest Michelle.
- Janet Chow as Wong Choi-fung, Cindy (王彩鳳), Bowie's wife, she didn't know that her husband was involved in Jay's murder. When Bowie died, Michelle was the one who hung around Cindy the most and comforted her because she had a hidden motive which was to find out any new information that the police had. In the end, Jim managed to convince Cindy into suspecting Alex, and when Cindy refused to return the Alex's Sports Climbing trophy which was the murder weapon, Michelle killed her and staged it as a suicide.

=== Case 7 (Episodes 21–25) ===
- Bowie Wu as Chin Kang, Howard (錢根), a billionaire who is Bonnie's husband. Also, Ella, Elaine and Hilbert's father, and Wind's grandfather.
- Halina Tam as Yiu Lai-ping, Bonnie (姚麗冰), Howard's second wife, who was killed by Chung accidentally.
- Rosanne Lui as Chin Mau-ying, Ella (錢茂英), Howard's elder daughter and Wind's mother.
- Cheng Tse Sing as Chin Mau-lam, Hilbert (錢茂林), Howard's second son and Ella and Elaine's brother.
- Florence Kwok as Chin Mau-sum, Elaine (錢茂森), Howard's third daughter and Ella and Hilbert's sister.
- Steven Ho as Cheung Kan-ming, Paul (張謹明), Howard's son-in-law and Elaine's husband, who was killed by poisoning.
- Yeung Ying Wai as Yeung Wai-dat, Martin (楊偉達), Howard's lawyer.
- Yeung Ching Wah as Kwok Ching-chung, Chung (郭精忠), Howard's servant, who killed Bonnie and Paul.
- Ron Ng as Lee Chin-fung, Wind (李展風), Howard's grandson and Ella's son.

=== Case 8 (Episode 26 - 28) ===
- Yvonne Ho as Chui Yan-yuet (崔恩月), nicknamed Sister Moon, an operation manager of a toy company, who is the subordinate and also the mistress of Chan Wah-keung. She was killed by Tsang Lai-sim, her subordinate.
- Wilson Tsui as Chan Wan-keung (陳華強), toy company owner, who is Moon's boss and lover.
- Tsang Wai-wan as Tsang Lai-sim (曾麗嬋), Moon's subordinate who killed Moon accidentally in a dispute.
- Law Ho-kai as Ma Chun-ping (馬俊平), a building security officer who had a dispute with Moon before Moon was killed.
- Shum Po-yee as Katy Cheung, Chan Wan-keung's subordinate and mistress.

=== Case 9 (Episode 28 - 30) ===
- Joseph Yeung as Chung Chi-pong (鍾志邦), Fung Hiu-ching's husband and Chung Hok-sum's father. He was hurt by Chiu Tai-lung and then killed by Tam Sing-yung 30 years ago.
- Chan Nim-kwan as Fung Hiu-ching (馮曉靜), Chung Chi-pong's wife and Chung Hok-sum's mother. She was murdered by Chiu Tai-lung 30 years ago.
- Maggie Cheung as Mandy Chung Hok-sum (鍾學心), Chung Chi-pong and Fung Hiu-ching's daughter, the only witness to the murder of her parents 30 years ago.
- Eric Chung as Tam Sing-yung (譚成勇), who was sentenced to life after the murder. But until his death in prison, he only recognized he killed Chung Chi-pong, but not Fung Hiu-ching.
- Nancy Wu as Chow Yik-fei (周奕霏), Po Kwok-tung's ex-wife, a barrister and later a law columnist. She wanted to uncover the truth behind the murder of the ex-wife, only to be murdered by Chiu Kwok-chi in an attempt for Chiu to leave no witnesses alive.
- Law Lok-lam as Chiu Tai-lung (趙大龍), a village resident in Yuen Long, the overarching antagonist of the ninth case, and a psychopathic criminal with a misogynistic outlook towards women. Abused by his stepmother in childhood, Chiu began resenting any woman who offended him or his son, Chiu Kwok-chi. He killed Chan Man-kuen and Fung Hiu-ching, and hurt Leung Chui-han 30 years ago. He also shot and killed Angel Chiang, during a confrontation at his own home. He was imprisoned in episode 30, yet committed suicide in jail.
- Chiu Man-tung as Chiu Kwok-chi (趙國智), Chiu Tai-lung and Chan Man-kuen's son and a deputy chief editor, and the main antagonist of the ninth case. Influenced by his father in childhood, he also became a sociopathic criminal who looked down on women and would often join his father in murdering. He killed Chow Yik-fei, his subordinate, in order not to disclose the burial of his mother's body in kitchen stove. Subsequently, he kidnapped Jack Po and Mandy Chung in order to kill them in fire but failed, and attempted to kill Ada Ling by holding her hands tightly when he was trapped in the car that was due to explode after his car got into an accident, but in the end he was shot in the head by Wind and the car exploded on him after Ada and Wind escaped.
- Poon Fong-fong as Chiu Tai-lung's stepmother who often abused Chiu.
- Celine Ma as Chan Man-kuen (陳文娟), Chiu Tai-lung's wife and Chiu Kwok-chi's mother, who was killed by Chiu Tai-lung and buried in kitchen stove 30 years ago.
- Aimee Chan as Angel Chiang (蔣卓君), who was killed by Chiu Tai-lung when she tried to rescue her boyfriend, Ken Ho.
- Wendy Hon as Leung Chui-han (梁翠嫻), who was hurt and nearly killed by Chiu Tai-lung 30 years ago.

== See also ==
- Forensic Heroes III
