= Forensic Heroes V =

2022 Hong Kong television series

- Also known as: 法證先鋒V
- Genre: Police procedural; Crime drama
- Written by: Yip Tin-sing; Sin Siu-ling
- Directed by: Ben Fong; Wong Kwok-fai; Au Yiu-kit; Cheung Hang-ho
- Starring: Bosco Wong; Jacky Cai; Benjamin Yuen; Venus Wong; Sisley Choi
- Opening theme: "Days Can't Be Wrong (天不會錯)" by Fred Cheng
- Country of origin: Hong Kong
- Original language: Cantonese
- No. of episodes: 30

Production
- Producer: Ben Fong
- Production location: Hong Kong
- Running time: 43 minutes
- Production companies: TVB; Youku

Original release
- Network: TVB Jade; myTV Super; Youku
- Release: 14 November – 23 December 2022

Related
- Forensic Heroes

Forensic Heroes V (Chinese: 法證先鋒V) is a Hong Kong crime and police procedural television series produced by TVB in collaboration with the mainland Chinese streaming platform Youku. As the fifth installment of the Forensic Heroes franchise, the 30-episode series premiered on Youku on 26 October 2022, followed by its broadcast debut on TVB Jade on 14 November 2022. The series features an entirely new main cast, including Bosco Wong, Jacky Cai, Benjamin Yuen, Venus Wong, and Sisley Choi, and follows a reconstituted investigative team as they tackle complex homicides and criminal conspiracies.

== Cast ==
=== Forensic Science Division ===
- Bosco Wong as Yu Sing-pak, Senior Chemist and Laboratory Expert. Meticulous and a lone wolf; shares a romantic subplot with Fok Po-ying.
- Matthew Ko as Cheung Sai-hei (Hayden), Senior Chemist, later revealed as the older brother of Cheung Man-kit and a fugitive criminal mastermind.
- Fred Cheng as Cham Ting, Scientific Evidence Officer (SEO).
- Irina Tang as Ko Hoi-hoi (Paris), SEO.
- Randal Tsang as Chow Cheuk-hin (Kevin), SEO.
- Lincoln Hui as Chung Hok-lai (Tony), SEO.
- Jumbo Tsang as Sung Hiu-yan (Kate), SEO.
- Telford Wong as Leung Chi-sun, SEO and mole within the division involved in vigilante killings.

=== Forensic Pathology Department ===
- Jacky Cai as Dr. Fan Pui-ching (Ruby), Forensic Pathologist. Intelligent and professional; close colleague of Yu Sing-pak.
- Matthew Chu as Tsui Yat-ming, Forensic Pathology Assistant

=== Regional Crime Unit ===
- Benjamin Yuen as Tseng Ho-yin, Senior Police Inspector. Workaholic with insomnia; develops a complex relationship with Tam Sin-man.
- Venus Wong as Fok Po-ying, Police Officer. Energetic and optimistic; develops a romantic interest in Yu Sing-pak.
- Wiyona Yeung as Tong Sum-yuet, Police Officer.
- Danny Hung as Lee Wai, Police Officer.
- Gordon Ip as Fu Siu-kei, Police Officer.
- Alan Chow as Luk Ka-chun, Police Officer.

=== Other key characters ===
- Sisley Choi as Tam Sin-man (Taya), a multi-hyphenate with several part-time jobs; emotionally supports Tseng Ho-yin and assists in investigations.
- Tony Hung as Chun Hak-nam, convicted former doctor; quietly protective of Dr. Fan.
- Karl Ting as Fu Kim-shing, expelled medical student and leader of a vigilante cell.
- Jason Lau as Szeto Leung, former forensic chemist.
- Brian Tse as Cheung Man-kit, triad leader and primary antagonist.
- Erica Chan as Tsui Ngan-kuk, social worker and trained boxer; member of the vigilante cell.
- Coco Chiang as Lam Hoi-hing, coffee shop owner and psychological manipulator.

== Episodes ==
No.	Title	Original release date
1	"Episodes 1−2"	14 November 2022
2	"Episodes 1−2"	15 November 2022
The team investigates a fatal fire breakout in a village house, uncovering a series of crimes within a dysfunctional family. Their investigation reveals multiple deaths linked to poisoning, kidnapping, and a failed revenge plot, culminating in the killings of the father and eldest daughter.
3	"Episodes 3−6"	16 November 2022
4	"Episodes 3−6"	17 November 2022
5	"Episodes 3−6"	18 November 2022
6	"Episodes 3−6"	21 November 2022
The team investigates the death of a woman found in her villa, initially believed to be a robbery-murder due to signs of strangulation and a break-in. Overlooked forensic evidence leads to a wrongful conviction, but the suspect is later released as new findings emerge. In a separate case, recently released ex-convict Hak-nam asks Ruby to reinvestigate his girlfriend's death, years after he was convicted of entering a suicide pact with her and supplying the drugs involved. The investigation reveals that the crime was actually committed by Ruby's best friend—Hak-nam's ex-girlfriend—who poisoned the victim out of jealousy.
7	"Episode 7"	22 November 2022
The team investigates a case of elder abuse at a senior care home, where the combined actions of the caretakers and one of the residents result in the death of a senior.
8	"Episodes 8−10"	23 November 2022
9	"Episodes 8−10"	24 November 2022
10	"Episodes 8−10"	25 November 2022
The team reopens a case involving the murder of a woman 42 years ago, after her body is discovered inside a television box. Investigation reveals that her boyfriend had been wrongly convicted. The team also uncovers another body at a distillery, killed by the boyfriend's sister and concealed with his help for decades.
11	"Episodes 11−13"	28 November 2022
12	"Episodes 11−13"	29 November 2022
13	"Episodes 11−13"	30 November 2022
Sing-pak continues investigating the woman's death in her villa and discovers that key evidence was tampered with by a team member, revealed to be Sai-hei, who then flees. Meanwhile, the team examines a separate case in which a man is found dead at home, suspected of CO₂ poisoning. In a third case, a man's body washes ashore with a fatal stab wound, leading police to a ramen shop and identifying the killer.
14	"Episodes 14−15"	1 December 2022
15	"Episodes 14−15"	2 December 2022
The team investigates three murders—a man killed with liquid nitrogen and thrown from a high-rise, a woman found in a fish tank drenched in tallow wax, and another man burned to death by fireworks—leading them to suspect a serial killer. Police believe the crimes are staged to represent the "18 Levels of Hell," including the Frozen Mountain, Bloody Lake, and Volcano. Before the killer is shot dead, Ruby is taken hostage and later discovers that her neighbor is an accomplice, who recaptures her, prompting her to stab him in self-defense.
16	"Episodes 16−17"	5 December 2022
17	"Episodes 16−17"	6 December 2022
While searching for her estranged father, Taya and Ho-yin discover his current wife dead from self-inflicted stab wounds and Taya's mother unconscious. The woman had committed suicide after discovering a photograph of her husband's first family. Investigation reveals that years earlier, Taya's father—who later developed retrograde amnesia—murdered Ho-yin's parents to fund his previous wife's treatment, leading to his arrest.
18	"Episodes 18−20"	7 December 2022
19	"Episodes 18−20"	8 December 2022
20	"Episodes 18−20"	9 December 2022
Following her encounter with serial killers, Ruby develops PTSD and experiences hallucinations. The team investigates the stabbing death of the man who hired Taya's father to murder Ho-yin's parents; the assailant is later killed by Man-kit, the villa case murderer, while Sai-hei, Man-kit's older brother, tampers with evidence to obstruct the investigation. In a separate case, a Forensic Science Division secretary's husband dies from asphyxia, later determined to have been accidentally smothered by his sleepwalking wife.
21	"Episodes 21−23"	12 December 2022
22	"Episodes 21−23"	13 December 2022
23	"Episodes 21−23"	14 December 2022
Following Ruby's recovery, the team reopens a cold case involving a senior officer who has been missing for 18 months. The investigation links three deceased insurance employees: an original murder victim, a skeletal second victim, and a man recently killed at home. It is revealed that a colleague murdered the first and third victims over a professional grievance, while the missing officer's partner killed the second victim during an unauthorized search and later accidentally caused the officer's death.
24	"Episodes 24−28"	15 December 2022
25	"Episodes 24−28"	16 December 2022
26	"Episodes 24−28"	19 December 2022
27	"Episodes 24−28"	20 December 2022
28	"Episodes 24−28"	21 December 2022
The arc follows a series of interconnected murders and criminal schemes. Kim-shing, alongside Ngan-kuk and Chi-sun, kills a drug supplier who had forced a teenage girl into trafficking; the supplier is later revealed to have supplied drugs to Man-kit. Sai-hei exploits the crime to boost Man-kit's triad standing by framing a rival, resulting in a wrongful conviction and death in prison. He then coerces the trio—now acting as a vigilante cell—into further "extrajudicial liquidations" of Man-kit's remaining rivals. The alliance collapses after Man-kit causes the death of a local coffee shop owner, a woman of significance to Sai-hei who had been kidnapped by his subordinates. In retaliation, Sai-hei orders the trio to kill the three men responsible for her death. Following the trio's arrest, the arc concludes with a violent confrontation between the Cheung brothers, during which Szeto Leung, who has a protective connection to the deceased coffee shop owner, fatally stabs Man-kit.
29	"Episodes 29−30"	22 December 2022
30	"Episodes 29−30"	23 December 2022
The investigation into Sai-hei's death identifies the new coffee shop owner as a psychological manipulator who exploits trauma to provoke homicidal behavior. She orchestrates the manipulation of Szeto Leung and Ngan-kuk, murders Sai-hei, and subsequently kidnaps Bo-ying, though Sing-pak successfully rescues her. The case focuses on profiling her pathological method of using murder as a form of emotional catharsis for her victims.

== Production ==
After producer Mui Siu-ching retired following the fourth season, the Forensic Heroes series continued under a new production team, with the recurring "clown" character remaining a central element throughout all installments. The fifth installment was produced by Ben Fong, with scripts supervised by Yip Tin-sing and Sin Siu-ling, and direction handled by Fong alongside a rotating team of directors. Filming took place approximately from September 2021 to January 2022. To ensure technical accuracy, the production team conducted extensive research into forensic terminology and provided actors with specialized training in laboratory protocols. A custom-built forensic office set was also constructed, featuring realistic props and modern filming techniques.

== Music ==
Track Listing
No.	Title	Lyrics	Music	Artist(s)	Length
1.	"Days Can't Be Wrong (天不會錯)"	Hayes Yeung	Alex Lau	Fred Cheng	3:12
2.	"Never Again (再也不見)"	Vivian Koo	Alex Lau; Vivian Koo	Vivian Koo	4:38
3.	"Farewell Yesterday (道別昨天)"	Hayes Yeung	Alan Cheung	Bosco Wong	4:16
4.	"Possibly (或者)"	Hayes Yeung	Alex Lau	Venus Wong	3:30

== Ratings and reception ==
The series received mixed reviews from audiences, earning a Douban rating of 5.9, with some critics and viewers expressing disappointment. In Hong Kong, it attracted 1.54 million viewers in its first week, with a slight decline to 1.42 million by the finale.

Week	Episodes	Airing dates	Ratings (Note: According to Hong Kong's TV rating system, each rating point represents approximately 64,670 viewers.)		Ref.
Week	Episodes	Airing dates	Cross-platform peak ratings	Viewership	Ref.
1	1 – 5	14–18 November 2022	23.7 points	1.54 million	
2	6 – 10	21–25 November 2022	22.5 points	1.46 million	
3	11 – 15	28 November–2 December 2022	21.7 points	1.41 million	
4	16 – 20	5–9 December 2022	20.5 points	1.33 million	
5	21 – 25	12–16 December 2022	21 points	1.36 million	
6	26 – 30	19–23 December 2022	21.8 points	1.42 million	

== Release ==
The series premiered on Youku on 26 October 2022, before airing on TVB Jade on 14 November 2022.

== Awards and nominations ==
Year	Award	Category	Nominated work	Results	Ref.
2022	AEG Entertainment Popularity	Best Actor (TV series)	Bosco Wong	Won	
2022	55th TVB Anniversary Awards	My Favorite Television Series (Malaysia)	Forensic Heroes V	Nominated	
2022	55th TVB Anniversary Awards	My Favorite Actor in a Leading Role (Malaysia)	Bosco Wong	Nominated	
