= The Legendary Ranger =

1993 Hong Kong cross-genre television miniseries

- Also known as: 原振俠
- Genre: Wuxia, fantasy, science fiction
- Starring: Leon Lai; Michelle Reis; Catherine Hung; Athena Chu
- Opening theme: Wishing That You'll Not Leave Tonight
- Country of origin: Hong Kong
- Original language: Cantonese
- No. of episodes: 20

Production
- Executive producer: Mui Siu-ching
- Production location: Hong Kong
- Running time: 45 minutes (each)
- Production company: TVB

Original release
- Network: Jade
- Release: 3 January – 26 March 1993

The Legendary Ranger (Chinese: 原振俠, Yuan Zhen-xia) is a 1993 Hong Kong cross-genre television miniseries produced by Mui Siu-ching and aired by TVB. The series starred Leon Lai, Michelle Reis and Catherine Hung, and featured a supporting cast of veteran actors, stars, and future stars, including Faye Wong and Athena Chu. It is based on Ni Kuang's fictional surgeon/adventurer Yuan Zhen-xia and is set in the Wisely fictional universe, a setting in which extraterrestrial aliens, magic and wuxia heroes co-exist.

At the time Leon Lai was at the beginning of the Four Heavenly Kings period of his career and the series' was filmed and edited, especially the fight scenes, with a pop video sensibility. The series cross-genre setting and visual aesthetic was at the time groundbreaking in comparison to the historical costume wuxia that Hong Kong audiences were used to.

== Plot ==
Yuan Zhen-xia is a top class surgeon, amateur detective and martial artist with an insatiable curiosity and the moral code of the traditional youxia. His curiosity draws him into investigating a slew of seemingly unrelated kidnappings and other bizarre crimes. However, as Yuan investigates deeper he discovers all the crimes are in fact linked and are part of a plot by a doomsday cult. Convinced that mankind is due to be wiped out by an extraterrestrial source, the cult's crimes are carried out to hide and fund the theft of genetic material from the brightest and fittest human specimens in order to create a master race with which to repopulate the earth. Despite becoming an implacable enemy of the cult, as an example of what the cult considers to be a perfect human, Yuan himself becomes a prime candidate for recruitment into the cult. To this end the cult sends its top agent, the beautiful model/actress Huang Juan to recruit Yuan.

Despite its illegal activities the cult's crimes are carried out in a perverted desire to protect humanity and to ensure its survival. Yuan discovers his true enemy is someone closer to home. Jin Shí, an adventuring companion of Yuan, a fellow surgeon and martial artist, becomes frustrated at always coming second best to Yuan, especially in the pursuit of the love of the dancer Lan Ling. Twisted by his own inferiority complex, Jin sets out to gain his revenge against Yuan, by destroying all that Yuan loves, starting with Lan Ling.

== Cast ==
Cast	Role	Description
Leon Lai	Yuan Zhen-xia (原振俠)	surgeon, amateur detective, martial artist, adventurer
Michelle Reis	Huang Juan (黃絹)	model, cult agent
Catherine Hung	Lan Ling (藍綾)	dancer, Yuan's lover, murdered and her soul/memories transferred to Huang Juan
Hugo Ng	Jin Shi (金石)	surgeon, amateur detective, martial artist, adventurer, comes to hate Yuan and begins to kill those who Yuan loves
Chin Ka-lok	Mo Ming (莫名)	cult enforcer
Athena Chu	Yun Cai (雲彩)	Yuan's nurse and companion, precognitive fortune teller
Marco Ngai	Prince	Prince of an island sultanate, kidnapped for genetic material
Faye Wong	Hai Tang (海棠)	The prince's bodyguard
Kwan Hoi-san	Rong Yao (榮耀)	Millionaire philanthropist, secret leader of a doomsday cult
Lily Li	Ru Yin (如茵)	Rong's companion and second in command
