= Shade of Darkness =

1994 Hong Kong TV series

- Also known as: 異度凶情
- Genre: Horror
- Starring: Canti Lau; Kenix Kwok; Ada Choi; Fiona Leung
- Country of origin: Hong Kong
- Original language: Cantonese
- No. of episodes: 20

Production
- Executive producer: Mui Siu-ching
- Production location: Hong Kong
- Running time: 45 minutes (each)
- Production company: TVB

Original release
- Network: Jade
- Release: 16 August – 10 September 1994

Shade of Darkness (Chinese: 異度凶情) is a 1994 horror series by Hong Kong television broadcaster TVB, starring Canti Lau and directed by Mui Siu-ching. Other members of the cast include Kenix Kwok.

== Synopsis ==
Luo Xiang buys a winning Hong Kong Jockey Club sweepstakes ticket, and because of it is murdered, along with his wife, son, and niece Xiao-Wei. His murderers are his neighbours who include Chen Tao who uses his share of the prize money to become a tycoon. Luo Xiang and his wife become hungry ghosts, unable to be reincarnated until they have avenged themselves. Over the years Luo Xiang's ghost and the ghost of his wife seeks out the murderers to eradicate them and their families. However, Xiang's son (Xiao-wei's cousin) has been reincarnated as Chen Jia-bo (Canti Lau) the son of Chen Tao. Luo Xiang and his wife managed to kill Chen Tao's mother while haunting Chen Jia-bo, who is unaware of his past life. Chen Tao is disturbed by the deaths and haunting that Luo Xiang and his wife causes such that he hires a ghost specialist, who is aware of the ghosts, to deal with them. Luo Xiang and his wife are banished and sealed away by a ceremonial dagger, which is buried in the site where Luo Xiang, his wife, and son were buried to prevent them from haunting and killing.

Through dreams linked to his past life, Chen Jia-bo is drawn to an island and the very area where he had been killed in his past life. By chance, he was abducted by gangsters in a ransom attempt and thrown into the sea. Luo Xiao-wei (Ada Choi), whose corpse had been accidentally cast into the sea on the night of the murders and somehow purified that she is a normal ghost, saves him and falls in love with Chen Jia-bo and follows him around once he is rescued. When Jia-bo's friend Yao Mei-qi (Kenix Kwok) is mortally wounded in a fall, Xiao-wei's spirit occupies her body in order to dwell in the realm of the living and be together with Jia-bo. A romance blossoms between the two, though, it doesn't last long as the ex-boyfriend of Yao Mei-qi fatally strangles her. As Xiao-wei lacks the power to prevent the corpse from decay, she forced to relinquish it, but not before Jia-bo comes to love her and learn a little of the truth.

The burial site of the ceremonial dagger and Luo Xiang's family is disturbed by a couple burying their dead dog and later unearthed due to heavy rains that flood the area. This results in the dagger moved from the specialized ghost seal and being discovered along with the skeletons of Luo Xiang, his wife, and son. The disturbance enables Luo Xiang and his wife to return to recruit Chen Jia-bo for their revenge.

Finding some closure after Xiao-wei, Jia-bo begins a relationship with Ye Hui (Fiona Leung). Ye Hui is the daughter of one of the murderers, who became a tramp and abandoned his family out of remorse for the death of the Luo family, though, he is later killed by the ghost of Luo Xiang's wife. When her mother (Lily Li) remarried, Ye Hui took her stepfather's surname and in doing so became hidden from Luo Xiang's quest for revenge. Chen Tao starts losing his family one by one to freak accidents set up by Luo Xiang while the relationship between him and Chen Jia-bo become strained. Furthermore, when the skeleton of Xiang's son is examined and shows similar structure to Jia-bo's skeletal X-ray scans, Chen Tao begins acting erratically to the point that he murdered some of his former associates, including one of the neighbors that had helped him kill the Luo family. The ghost specialist is called on again and another banishing ceremony is performed after Chen-To recovers the skeletons of Luo Xiang and his wife. Luo Xiang's skeleton is cast into the fire, forcing the ghost into the afterlife. Chen Jia-bo interrupts the ceremony, though, and the spirit of Luo Xiang's wife takes possession of him after specialist accidentally wounds him that some blood falls onto her bones. Luo Xiang's wife learns of both Ye Hui's identity and attempts to possess Jia-bo to avenge her by killing Ye Hui and Chen Tao. Barely sparing both Ye Hui and Chen To despite being possessed, Jia-bo takes his own life by throwing himself into a fire, forcing the spirit of Luo Xiang's wife into the afterlife as well. Chen Tao, having lost everyone and everything, survives the wrath of the ghosts only to be killed and robbed in the same manner that he inflicted on the Luo Family. One day, Ye Hui visits Jia-bo's grave and when she leaves, she sees the spirits of Jia-bo and Xiao-Wei together before smiling, finding some sense of peace.

== Side stories ==
The TV series also goes into a few minor stories, particularly a murder case in which a detective, who happens to be one of Jia-bo's friends, finds a painting of a childhood crush from his hometown and eventually discovered her murder due to her ghost leading him to her body and her murderer.
