= Forensic Heroes IV =

- 法證先鋒IV
- Genre: Police procedural
- Created by: Mui Siu-ching
- Written by: Leung Man-wah; Yuen Mei-fung; Sin Chui Ching
- Starring: Raymond Wong; Selena Lee; Shaun Tam; Alice Chan; Rebecca Zhu; Roxanne Tong
- Theme music composer: Alan Cheung Ka-shing
- Opening theme: 圓謊 performed by Justin Lo
- Ending theme: 不要流淚 performed by Fred Cheng 我不是她 performed by Hana Kuk
- Country of origin: Hong Kong
- Original language: Cantonese
- No. of episodes: 30

Production
- Executive producer: Mui Siu-ching
- Producer: Ben Fong
- Production location: Hong Kong
- Camera setup: Multi camera
- Running time: 45 minutes (per episode)
- Production company: TVB

Original release
- Network: TVB Jade
- Release: 17 February – 27 March 2020

Related
- Forensic Heroes (2006); Forensic Heroes II (2008); Forensic Heroes III (2011); Forensic Heroes V (2022); Forensic Heroes VI: Redemption (2024)

Forensic Heroes IV is a 2020 Hong Kong police procedural television drama produced by Television Broadcasts Limited (TVB). It stars Raymond Wong, Selena Lee, Shaun Tam, Alice Chan, Rebecca Zhu and Roxanne Tong in the reboot installment and is the second reboot of the Forensic Heroes series, featuring new stories and characters. Mui Siu-ching, who also produced the original series, serves as the executive producer.

== Synopsis ==
Senior Forensic Chemist Ko On (Raymond Wong) from the Forensic Science Division, Senior Forensic Pathologist Man Ka-hei (Selena Lee) from the Forensic Pathology Division, and Senior Inspector Kwok Fai-wong (Shaun Tam) from the Kowloon West Regional Crime Unit, formed a crime-solving triangle with their professional teams. The childhood regrets of hot-blooded reporter Chris Tsui (Roxanne Tong) who were closely related to Ko On sister abduction years ago. Scientific Evidence Officer Shui Wai-ming (Alice Chan) became a murder suspect upon her boyfriend's murder while Sergeant Ko Ching (Rebecca Zhu) who is a Sergeant who persistently investigating the truth of her sister's abduction alongside Ko On (Raymond Wong). The crime-solving triangle firmly believes that good always triumph over evil and fights for justice.

== Production ==
A costume fitting press conference was held on 24 October 2018. Principal photography began in October 2018 and concluded in March 2019, with some scenes filmed in Taiwan. The blessing ceremony was held on 21 January 2019.

In April 2019, Jacqueline Wong, who was cast as Chris Tsui, was found to be involved in a cheating scandal. Producer Mui Siu-ching confirmed that the role would be recast and all scene with Wong would be reshot. Roxanne Tong took the role and reshoots lasted from June 2019 to July 2019.

== Cast and characters ==
=== Hong Kong General Laboratory ===
==== Forensic Science Division ====
Character	Actor	Occupation
Dr. Ko On	Raymond Wong	Forensic Laboratory Supervisor / Senior Chemist
Queen Shui Wai-ming	Alice Chan	Scientific Evidence Officer (S.E.O.)
Charm Ting	Fred Cheng	Scientific Evidence Officer (S.E.O.)
Ocean Lam	William Chu	Scientific Evidence Officer (S.E.O.)
Howard Chan	Terrence Huang	Forensic Technician

==== Forensic Pathology Division ====
Character	Actor	Occupation
Dr. Man Ka-hei	Selena Lee	Senior Forensic Pathologist
Ivan Szeto	Fred Cheung	Forensic Pathologist

=== Kowloon West Regional Crime Unit (RCU) ===
Character	Actor	Occupation
SIP Kwok Fai-wong	Shaun Tam	RCU Senior Inspector of Police
WSGT Ko Ching	Rebecca Zhu	RCU Sergeant
PC Yu Wai-ding	Arnold Kwok	RCU Police Constable
PC Mok King-chiu	Fei Wu	RCU Police Constable
WPC Tong Sum-yuet	Wiyona Yeung	RCU Police Constable

=== Main characters ===
- Raymond Wong as Dr. Ko On (高安), a senior chemist and laboratory supervisor from the Forensic Science Division.
- Selena Lee as Dr. Man Ka-hei (聞家希), a senior forensic pathologist from the Forensic Pathology Division.
- Shaun Tam as Kwok Fai-wong (郭輝煌), a senior inspector from the Kowloon West Regional Crime Unit.
- Alice Chan as Queen Shui Wai-ming (水慧明), a scientific evidence officer (SEO) from the Forensic Science Division.
- Rebecca Zhu as Ko Ching (高靖), a sergeant from the Kowloon West Regional Crime Unit.
- Roxanne Tong as Chris Tsui (徐意), an online news reporter.

=== Notable characters ===
- Fred Cheng as Charm Ting (湛霆), a scientific evidence officer (SEO) from the Forensic Science Division.
- Yumiko Cheng as Monique Hau (侯敏莉), a sommelier and Ko On's girlfriend, though they later broke up.
- Gabriel Harrison as Stan Sze (施見賢), a voiceprint expert.
- Kelly Cheung as Emma Ma Oi-mei / Ko Sin (馬愛薇 / 高善)

=== Supporting characters ===
- William Chu as Ocean Lam (林凱淳), a scientific evidence officer (SEO) from the Forensic Science Division.
- Terrence Huang as Howard Chan (陳浩榮), a forensic technician from the Forensic Science Division.
- Fred Cheung as Ivan Szeto (司徒勳), a forensic pathologist from the Forensic Pathology Division.
- Arnold Kwok as Yu Wai-ding (余偉鼎), an officer from the Kowloon West Regional Crime Unit.
- Fei Wu as Mok King-chiu (莫敬超), an officer from the Kowloon West Regional Crime Unit.
- Wiyona Yeung as Tong Sum-yuet (唐心悅), an officer from the Kowloon West Regional Crime Unit.

=== Cameo appearances ===
- Patrick Tse as Long Siu-tin (龍兆天), the founder of a famous Cantonese Opera troupe.
- Michelle Yim as Long Ying-suet (龍映雪), a famous Cantonese Opera actress and the leader of the Cantonese Opera troupe.
- Nina Paw as So Fong (蘇芳), a mother who sold her daughter because of poverty, but she was regretful and tried hard to find her daughter.
- Mak Ling-ling as Principal Mak (麥校長), a secondary school principal.

== Reception ==
When TVB first announced the drama will air in February 2020 which is considered an unpopular time slot, it was expected the drama will receive lower viewership. However, due to the COVID-19 pandemic, Hong Kong went into a strict lockdown in February 2020, which gave viewership ratings a large boost, making the series the most watched drama since 2013. However, the drama was criticized by audiences for its predictable and average plot compared to its predecessors, especially in the latter half of the series.

== Sequel ==
Due to the series' high viewership ratings, a fifth sequel was worked on with new cast members originally including Priscilla Wong and Pakho Chau but was changed to Bosco Wong and Benjamin Yuen. Despite the sequel had a case following the final case shown in the end of the fourth installment and Fred Cheng and Wiyona Yeung's characters remained, the fifth installment had no connection to the previous 4 installments. Production of the fifth sequel began in September 2021 and ended in January 2022. The show first started airing on Youku, along with TVB Anywhere and TVB Anywhere Malaysia on October 26, 2022. It would later start airing on TVB Jade and Astro AOD on November 14, 2022, being the last of TVB's four 2022 grand anniversary dramas to be broadcast.

== Viewership ratings ==
The following is a table that includes a list of the total ratings points based on television viewership. "Viewers in millions" refers to the number of people, derived from TVB Jade ratings in Hong Kong who watched the episode live and on myTV SUPER.

#	Week	Episode(s)	Avg. points	Viewers in millions	Ref.
1	17 February 2020	1	37.1	2.42	
1	17 — 21 February 2020	1 — 5	35.7	2.33	
2	24 — 28 February 2020	6 — 10	35.8		
3	2 — 6 March 2020	11 — 15	35.5		
4	9 — 13 March 2020	16 — 20	35.4	2.32	
5	16 — 20 March 2020	21 — 25	36.8		
6	23 March 2020	26	40	2.62	
6	23 — 27 March 2020	26 — 30	38.8		
6	27 March 2020	30	39.6		
