= The Dragon Chronicles – The Maidens =

1994 Hong Kong film by Andy Chin

- DVD cover art
- 新天龍八部之天山童姥
- Directed by: Andy Chin
- Screenplay by: Charcoal Tan
- Based on: Demi-Gods and Semi-Devils by Jin Yong
- Produced by: Jimmy Heung
- Starring: Brigitte Lin; Gong Li; Sharla Cheung; Frankie Lam; Norman Chui
- Cinematography: Poon Hang-sang; Ray Wong; Yim Wai-gwaan
- Edited by: Kam Ma
- Music by: Violet Lam
- Production company: Win's Movie Production
- Release date: 5 March 1994
- Running time: 97 minutes
- Country: Hong Kong
- Language: Cantonese
- Box office: HK$6,529,579

The Dragon Chronicles – The Maidens (新天龍八部之天山童姥), also known as The Maidens of Heavenly Mountains, Semi-Gods and Semi-Devils, and The Dragon Chronicles – The Maidens of Heavenly Mountains, is a 1994 Hong Kong wuxia film adapted from the novel Demi-Gods and Semi-Devils by Jin Yong. The film was directed by Andy Chin, and starred Brigitte Lin, Gong Li, Sharla Cheung, Frankie Lam, and Norman Chui.

== Synopsis ==
Li Qiushui of the Mount Heaven Sect is in love with her senior Xiaoyaozi, the sect's leader. However, she does not know that the one Xiaoyaozi truly loves is actually her twin sister, Li Canghai. Wu Xingyun, who is also from their sect, is in love with Li Canghai.

Xiaoyaozi is dying after being poisoned by his treacherous apprentice, Ding Chunqiu. Seeking a successor, he sets up a weiqi puzzle to test their intelligence. Eventually, Xuzhu, a kind-hearted Shaolin monk, solves the puzzle by luck and inherits Xiaoyaozi's skills and neigong.

Meanwhile, Wu Xingyun and Li Qiushui have been fighting over the position of their sect's leader, giving Ding Chunqiu a chance to take advantage of the chaos to gain power. At the critical moment, Ding Chunqiu's apprentice, Azi, chooses goodness over evil and teams up with Xuzhu to help Wu Xingyun and Li Qiushui defeat Ding Chunqiu and restore peace on Mount Heaven.

== Cast ==
- Brigitte Lin as Li Qiushui / Li Canghai
- Gong Li as Wu Xingyun (Tianshan Tonglao)
- Sharla Cheung as Azi
- Frankie Lam as Xuzhu
- Norman Chui as Ding Chunqiu
- Liu Kai-chi as Su Xinghe
- James Pax as Xiaoyaozi
- Yu Wenzhong as Xuanci

== Music ==
The song played in the ending credits is "Only Myself" (只有我自己) by Faye Wong.
