= Forensic Heroes II =

- Official poster
- 法證先鋒II
- Genre: Police procedural
- Starring: Bobby Au-Yeung; Frankie Lam; Kevin Cheng; Charmaine Sheh; Yoyo Mung; Linda Chung; Raymond Cho; Florence Kwok
- Opening theme: "遺留" by performed by Edmond Leung
- Ending theme: "等你" performed by Charmaine Sheh "You Are My Angel" performed by Loretta Chow
- Country of origin: Hong Kong
- Original language: Cantonese
- No. of episodes: 30

Production
- Producer: Mui Siu Ching
- Running time: 45 minutes (approx.)

Original release
- Network: TVB
- Release: May 19 – June 28, 2008

Related
- Forensic Heroes (2006); Forensic Heroes III (2011); Forensic Heroes IV (2020); Forensic Heroes V (2022); Forensic Heroes VI: Redemption (2024)

Forensic Heroes II (Traditional Chinese: 法證先鋒II) is a TVB modern suspense series broadcast in May 2008 and it stars Bobby Au-Yeung, Frankie Lam, Yoyo Mung, Linda Chung, Raymond Cho and Florence Kwok with new casts Kevin Cheng and Charmaine Sheh in the second installment of the Forensic Heroes series.

== Synopsis ==
Bomb disposal expert Yeung Yat-Sing, Ivan, (Kevin Cheng) returns from England to visit relatives and happens to come across a grenade case by accident. Ivan's skills are highly appreciated by Senior Chemist Ko Yin-Bok, Timothy, (Bobby Au-Yeung) and he is invited to join the Forensic Division. Ivan soon becomes the division's rising star. Ivan gets back in touch with his long-lost best friend Koo Chak-Sam, Sam (Frankie Lam). Sam serves as a forensic writer and he is going to get married soon.

During a case, Sam's fiancée Lam Ding-Ding (Linda Chung) and Timothy's police girlfriend Leung Siu-Yau (Yoyo Mung) are caught in an explosion meant to kill two drug dealers. Ding-Ding dies of her injuries, while Siu-Yau loses movement in her right hand and goes half-deaf. Yau's duties are passed to Ma Kwok-Ying, Bell, (Charmaine Sheh) from the Narcotics Bureau. Both Sam and Ivan find Bell extremely charming with her smart and unfathomable characteristics in case handling. Then Ivan fell in love with Bell and the two become a couple.

The trio is involved in detective work to combat crime. As they get to know each other more deeply, a love triangle develops and this hinders their careers. Exemplary forensic cases they work on include "The Skeleton", "The Case of the Disabled", "The Movie Star Mystery".

== Cast ==
=== Main cast ===
Cast	Role	Description
Bobby Au-Yeung (歐陽震華)	Ko Yin-Bok (Timothy) 高彥博	Forensic Laboratory Supervisor / Senior Chemist; Leung Siu-Yau's boyfriend later husband at the last episode. Koo Chak-Sum's best friend.
Frankie Lam (林文龍)	Koo Chak-Sum (Sam) 古澤琛	Senior Forensic Pathologist / Mystery Writer; Lam Ding-Ding's fiancé. Ko Yin-Bok and Yeung Yat-Sing's best friend.
Kevin Cheng (鄭嘉穎)	Yeung Yat-Sing (Ivan) 楊逸升	Scientific Evidence Officer (SEO); Ma Kwok-Ying's boyfriend later fiancé. Koo Chak-Sum's best friend.
Charmaine Sheh (佘詩曼)	Ma Kwok-Ying (Bell) 馬幗英	NB Senior Inspector Of Police of NB before being transferred to Kowloon West D.C.S. Senior Inspector of Police; Ma Kwok-Wang's elder half sister Yeung Yat-Sing's girlfriend later fiancé. (English Horse)
Yoyo Mung (蒙嘉慧)	Leung Siu-Yau (Nicole) 梁小柔	Kowloon West D.C.S. Senior Inspector of Police before being transferred to Senior Inspector of Police of C.R.B. Leung Siu-Kong's elder sister. Ko Yin-Bok's girlfriend later wife at the last episode. Became half-deaf from a bomb incident meant for drug dealers.
Linda Chung (鍾嘉欣) (Note: Due to schedule conflicts with The Gem of Life (珠光寶氣), Linda Chung's role was written off early in the story.)	Lam Ding-Ding 林汀汀	Forensic Technician; Koo Chak-Sum's fiancé Died in episode 5 from a bomb incident.
Raymond Cho (曹永廉)	Sum Hung 沈雄	C.I.D. Sergeant; Mok Suk-Woon's boyfriend.
Florence Kwok	Mok Suk-Woon (Yvonne) 莫淑媛	Senior Scientific Evidence Officer (SSEO); Sum Hung's girlfriend.
Astrid Chan	Lam Pui-Pui 林沛沛	Lam Ding-Ding's elder sister. Ko Yin-Bok's ex-girlfriend. Hui Lap-Yan's wife.
Vivien Yeo	Ling Sum-Yee (Josie) 凌心怡	West Kowloon D.C.S. Police Constable

=== Other cast ===
Cast	Role	Description
Fred Cheng	Leung Siu-Kong 梁小剛	Forensic Technician; Leung Siu-Yau's younger brother.
Yu Yang	Leung Hing-Lung 梁興隆	Leung Siu-Yau and Leung Siu-Kong's father.
Oscar Leung	Ching Wai-Shing (Edwin) 程偉勝	Kowloon West D.C.S. Police Constable
Eddie Li	Lau Tsun-Sek (Terence) 劉俊碩	Kowloon West D.C.S. Police Constable
Matthew Ko	Mok Ching-Hong (Wilson) 莫正康	Kowloon West D.C.S. Police Constable; Fong Miu-Na's boyfriend.
Macy Chan (陳美詩)	Fong Miu-Na (Formula) 方妙娜	Police Constable; Yeung Yat Sing's cousin. Mok Ching-Hong's girlfriend.
Law Lok Lam (羅樂林)	Ma Kam-To 馬錦濤	Restaurant chain owner Ma Kwok-Ying and Ma Kwok-Wang's father.
Angelina Lo (盧宛茵)	Kwok Yee-Fan 郭綺芬	Ma Kwok-Wang's mother. Ma Kwok-Ying's stepmother.
Kara Hui	Cheng Lai-Ling 鄭麗玲	Ma Kwok-Ying's mother. Ma Kwok-Wang's stepmother
Stefan Wong	Ma Kwok-Wang (Ben) 馬國宏	Managed one of his father restaurant chain Ma Kwok-Ying's half brother.
Savio Tsang (曾偉權)	Hui Lap-Yan (Matt) 許立仁	Lam Pui-Pui's husband. Died in Ep 7
Queena Chan (陳丹丹)	Cheuk Lam 卓嵐	Stunts Person (Stunt Double); Killed Annie, accidentally killed Cherry in an attempt to poison mabel, wounded Mabel, Ivan Yeung, and Ma Kwok Ying; Died after falling from rooftop in Ep 30

=== Guest starring ===
Cast	Role	Description
Shirley Yeung	Kwok Hiu-Lam (Sharon) 郭曉琳	Singer
Selena Lee	"Cat" Lee Kiu 李蕎	Mr. Cho's Personal Assistant; Koo Chak-Sam's old classmate.
Sharon Chan		Wedding Guest; Girl resembling Lam Ding-Ding.
Jack Wu	Yip Chi-Man 葉志文	Professional Clown; One of the Villains from Ep 1–4
Charles Szeto (司徒瑞祈)	Li Chung-Sun (Paul) 李忠信	Paint Ball Clerk
Lai Lok-yi	Li Chi-Wai 李志偉	Ma Kwok-Wang's restaurant partner. Villain
Sam Chan	Tam Ka-Lok 譚家樂	Song Writer for Sharon
Shermon Tang	Mui Chin (Mabel) 梅芊	Actress
Sharon Luk	Ng Sze-Ying (Cherry) 吳詩瑩	Actress
Leanne Li	Ngai Hoi-Nga (Annie) 魏凱雅	Actress
Benjamin Yuen	Cheuk Kwan-Wing (Eric) 卓鈞榮	Actor/Script Translator
Stephen Wong	Fu Ching-Kei 博正基	
Ben Wong	Wong Jing Hung	Drug Dealer; Murder victim from Ep 1–4.
Lorea Solabarrieta Cheung	Tung Miu-so (Jenny) 童妙素	Appeared in photos only
Dickson Lee (李家聲)	Fung Siu-cheung (Dr. Fung) 馮紹祥	Appeared in photos only

== Viewership ratings ==
	Week	Episode	Average Points	Peaking Points	References
1	May 19–22, 2008	1 — 4	33	35	
2	May 26–30, 2008	5 — 9	31	33	
3	June 2–6, 2008	10 — 14	31	34	
4	June 9–13, 2008	15 — 19	31	34	
5	June 16–20, 2008	20 — 24	33	39	
6	June 23–27, 2008	25 — 29	34	37	
6	June 28, 2008	30	34	39	

== Accolades ==
41st TVB Anniversary Awards (2008)

- "Best Drama" Top 5
- "Best Actor in a Leading Role" (Frankie Lam - Sam Koo Chak-Sam) Top 10
- "Best Actress in a Leading Role" (Charmaine Sheh - Bell Ma Kwok-Ying) Top 10

== See also ==
- Locard's exchange principle—mentioned several times in different episodes

== Subsequent series ==
TVB has announced during its 42nd anniversary that Forensic Heroes III is part of the drama production in 2010.
