= Forensic Heroes III =

Hong Kong television series

- Official poster
- 法證先鋒III
- Genre: Police procedural
- Created by: Mui Siu-ching
- Written by: Choi Ting-ting; Leung Man-wah
- Starring: Wayne Lai; Maggie Cheung; Kate Tsui; Ron Ng; Aimee Chan; Edwin Siu; Nancy Wu; Ruco Chan; Ram Chiang; Yuen Wah
- Theme music composer: Yip Kai-chung
- Opening theme: "目擊" performed by Wayne Lai and Ron Ng
- Country of origin: Hong Kong
- Original languages: Cantonese; Mandarin
- No. of episodes: 30

Production
- Executive producer: Mui Siu-ching
- Production location: Hong Kong
- Camera setup: Multi camera
- Running time: 45 minutes (per episode)
- Production company: TVB

Original release
- Network: TVB Jade
- Release: 10 October – 20 November 2011

Related
- Forensic Heroes (2006); Forensic Heroes II (2008); Forensic Heroes IV (2020); Forensic Heroes V (2022); Forensic Heroes VI: Redemption (2024)

Forensic Heroes III
- title screen
- Traditional Chinese: 法證先鋒III
- Simplified Chinese: 法证先锋III
- Literal meaning: "Forensic science vanguard III"
Transcriptions
Standard Mandarin
- Hanyu Pinyin: Fǎ Zhèng Xiān Fēng Sān
Yue: Cantonese
- Jyutping: Faat3 Zing3 Sin1 Fung1 Saam1

Forensic Heroes III (Chinese: 法證先鋒III) is a 2011 Hong Kong police procedural television drama produced by Television Broadcasts Limited (TVB). It stars Wayne Lai, Maggie Cheung, Kate Tsui, Ron Ng, Aimee Chan, Edwin Siu, Nancy Wu and Ruco Chan in the reboot of the Forensic Heroes series, featuring new stories and characters. Mui Siu-ching, who also produced the original series, serves as the executive producer.

The drama was a ratings success, and is Hong Kong's highest-rating serial drama of 2011.

== Synopsis ==
Senior Forensic Chemist Jack Po (Wayne Lai), better known as Pro Sir, is the head of the Forensic Science Department and is skilled at analysing criminal psychology. He has a unique view on human nature and is familiar with the structure of various firearms. Pro Sir works closely with Senior Forensic Pathologist Mandy Chung (Maggie Cheung Ho-yee) in a wide range of fields including psychology, anthropology, criminology and forensic science.

DCS Senior Inspector Ada Ling (Kate Tsui) and Sergeant Lee Chin-fung (Ron Ng), better known as Wind, work together and crack many murder cases. Their relationship goes from good friends 'brothers' to a pair of lovers.

With a backbone of 12 cases, the forensic scientists, forensic doctors and the police all work together to accommodate each other to solve these cases. The perspective in this third installment is much wider than the previous two seasons with a legal standpoint in addition to the forensics.

== Production ==
A costume fitting press conference was held on 3 January 2011. Filming started on 28 January 2011 and the blessing ceremony was held on 24 February 2011. Charmaine Sheh was originally set to be the lead actress, however after suffering injuries slipping on a patch of ice in Shanghai, she was forced to withdraw from the series. She was replaced by Maggie Cheung Ho-yee.

== Cast and characters ==
=== Hong Kong General Laboratory ===
==== Forensic Science Division ====
Character	Actor	Occupation
Dr. Jack Po	Wayne Lai	Forensic Laboratory Supervisor / Senior Chemist
Paul Yau	Ram Chiang	Senior Scientific Evidence Officer (S.S.E.O.)
Angel Chiang	Aimee Chan	Forensic Technician
Ken Ho	Edwin Siu	Forensic Technician
Gary Leung	Yeung Chiu-hoi	Forensic Technician
Lawrence Yuen	Brian Tse	Forensic Technician
Eric Lau	Stanley Cheung	Forensic Technician
Rosie Wong	Aurora Li	Forensic Technician

==== Forensic Pathology Division ====
Character	Actor	Occupation
Dr. Mandy Chung	Maggie Cheung Ho-yee	Senior Forensic Pathologist
Sunny Suen	Ronald Law	Forensic Pathologist

=== Kowloon West District Crime Squad (DCS) ===
Character	Actor	Occupation
CIP Jason Ko	Geoffrey Wong	DCS Chief Inspector
WSIP Ada Ling	Kate Tsui	DCS Senior Inspector of Police
SGT Lee Chin-fung	Ron Ng	DCS Sergeant
PC Lam Hong-chan	Jim Tang	DCS Police Constable
PC Lai Ming-wai	Sammy Sum	DCS Police Constable
PC Wu sin-hang	Otto Chan	DCS Police Constable
WPC Lee Ka-lo	Jess Sum	DCS Police Constable

=== Main characters ===
- Wayne Lai as Dr. Jack Po (布國棟), a senior chemist and laboratory supervisor of the Forensic Science Division. He formerly worked in the Forensic Firearms Examination Bureau as a forensic firearms analyst.
- Maggie Cheung Ho-yee as Dr. Mandy Chung (鍾學心), a senior forensic pathologist from the Forensic Pathology Division.
- Kate Tsui as Ada Ling (凌倩兒), a Senior Inspector of Police from the Kowloon West District Crime Squad.
- Ron Ng as Lee Chin-fung (李展風), a Sergeant from the Kowloon West District Crime Squad.

=== Notable characters ===
- Aimee Chan as Angel Chiang (蔣卓君), a forensic technician under the Forensic Science Division. She previously worked in the United States as a crime scene investigator (CSI).
- Edwin Siu as Ken Ho (何正民), a forensic technician under the Forensic Science Division.
- Nancy Wu as Eva Chow (周奕霏), an ambitious barrister and Pro Sir's wife (Later ex-wife).
- Ruco Chan as Jim Fong (方世友), a clinical psychologist who specialises in criminal psychology. Chan appeared in a limited number of episodes.

=== Recurring characters ===
- Ram Chiang as Paul Yau (游健保), the senior scientific evidence officer (SSEO) from the Forensic Science Division.
- Yuen Wah as Po Shun-hing (布順興), Pro Sir's father.
- Chow Chung as Chung Pok-sze (鍾博史), Mandy's grandfather.
- Mary Hon as Cheung Fung-ping (張鳳萍), Ada's mother.
- Jim Tang as Lam Hong-chan (林康贊), an officer from the Kowloon West District Crime Squad.
- Sammy Sum as Lai Ming-wai (黎明偉), an officer from the Kowloon West District Crime Squad.
- Otto Chan as Wu Sin-hang (胡善行), an officer from the Kowloon West District Crime Squad.
- Jess Sum as Lee Ka-lo (李嘉露), an officer from the Kowloon West District Crime Squad.
- Geoffrey Wong as Jason Ko (高偉雄), the Chief Inspector of Police from the Kowloon West District Crime Squad.
- Ronald Law as Sunny Suen (孫嘉軒), a probationary forensic pathologist who is mentored by Mandy.
- Yeung Chiu-hoi as Gary Leung (梁子豪), a forensic technician from the Forensic Science department.
- Brian Tse as Lawrence Yuen (阮志雄), a forensic technician from the Forensic Science department.
- Stanley Cheung as Eric Lau (劉文傑), a forensic technician from the Forensic Science department.
- Aurora Li as Rosie Wong (黃淑如), a forensic technician from the Forensic Science department.
- Moon Chan as Po Ka-man (布家雯), Pro Sir and Eva's daughter.
- Brian Chu as Simon Yau (游俊傑), Paul's son.

== Viewership ratings ==
Forensic Heroes III was the most watched TVB drama of 2011. The following is a table that includes a list of the total ratings points based on television viewership. "Viewers in millions" refers to the number of people, derived from TVB Jade ratings (including TVB HD Jade), in Hong Kong who watched the episode live. The peak number of viewers are in brackets.

#	Week	Episode(s)	Avg. points (peak)	Viewers in millions (peak)	Ref.
1	10 October 2011	1	34 (35)	2.17 (2.23)	
1	10 — 14 October 2011	1 — 5	31 (34)	1.98 (2.17)	
2	17 — 21 October 2011	6 — 10	31 (33)	1.98 (2.10)	
3	24 — 27 October 2011	11 — 14	32 (35)	2.04 (2.23)	
4	1 — 4 November 2011	15 — 18	33 (36)	2.10 (2.29)	
5	7 — 11 November 2011	19 — 23	33 (36)	2.10 (2.29)	
6	14 — 18 November 2011	24 — 28	33	2.10	
7	20 November 2011	29 — 30	40 (43)	2.55 (2.74)	

== Forensic Heroes III and the CSI effect in Hong Kong ==
In 2014, Cora Y.T. Hui and Professor T. Wing Lo of the City University of Hong Kong conducted a study to determine if the "CSI effect" was taking place in Hong Kong due to the popularity of Forensic Heroes III. They believed that since the Forensic Heroes series was one of the few ways Hong Kong citizens were exposed to forensic science, it would have a large influence on participant's legal-decision making. A questionnaire was given to 528 Hong Kong citizens residing in Hong Kong for seven or more years and all 18 and over. The results showed that participants who regularly viewed shows like Forensic Heroes III were more likely to expect scientific evidence in a case than non viewers. They were also less uncertain about whether or not that evidence should be presented. Despite the effects of the media on participants' perception of legal evidence, it did not affect their overall legal-decision making. Therefore, Hui and Lo's study suggests that the CSI effect is not present in Hong Kong.

== Accolades ==
=== 45th TVB Anniversary Awards 2011 ===
- Nominated: Best Drama (Top 5)
- Nominated: Best Actor (Wayne Lai) Top 5
- Nominated: Best Actress (Maggie Cheung) Top 5
- Nominated: My Favourite Male Character (Wayne Lai) Top 5
- Nominated: My Favourite Female Character (Maggie Cheung) Top 5
- Nominated: My Favourite Female Character (Aimee Chan) Top 5
- Nominated: Best Supporting Actor (Lee Kwok Lun) Top 5
- Nominated: Best Supporting Actress (Nancy Wu) Top 5
- Nominated: Most Improved Female Artiste (Cilla Kung)
