= The Herbalist's Manual =

2005 Hong Kong television series

- Poster
- Genre: Costume drama
- Starring: Frankie Lam; Michelle Ye; Kenneth Ma
- Opening theme: Sai Sheung Mo Nan Si (世上無難事) performed by Frankie Lam
- Country of origin: Hong Kong
- Original language: Cantonese
- No. of episodes: 25

Production
- Running time: 45 minutes per episode

Original release
- Network: TVB
- Release: November 28 – December 30, 2005

The Herbalist's Manual
- Traditional Chinese: 本草藥王
- Simplified Chinese: 本草药王
Transcriptions
Yue: Cantonese
- Jyutping: Bun2 Cou2 Joek1 Wong4

The Herbalist's Manual is a Hong Kong television series released overseas in May 2005 and broadcast on TVB Jade channel in November 2005.

The series focuses on the greatest physician and pharmacologist in Chinese history, Li Shizhen, and his herbalist manual, Bencao Gangmu.

== Cast ==
Note: Some of the characters' names are in Cantonese romanisation.

Cast	Role	Description
Frankie Lam	Lee See-Jan 李時珍	Herb Doctor; Ng Mo-Yung's husband.
Michelle Ye	Dong Ching 冬青	
Kenneth Ma	Pong Hin 龐憲	
Wilson Tsui (艾威)	Lee Gwoh-Jan 李果珍	Lee See-Jan's brother.
Law Koon Lan (羅冠蘭)	Cheung Kiu 張嬌	Lee See-Jan and Lee Gwoh-Jan's mother.
Chun Wong (秦煌)	Ging Wong 荊王	Ng Mo-Yung's uncle.
Law Lok Lam (羅樂林)	Yim Sung 嚴嵩	Yim Sai-Fan's father.
Li Ka Sing (李家聲)	Yim Sai-Fan 嚴世藩	Yim Sung's son.
Felix Lok (駱應鈞)	Pong Bak-Chuen 龐百川	Pong Hin's father.
Power Chan	Dai Wong-Chi 大王子	
Selena Li	Ng Mo-Yung 吳慕榕	Lee See-Jan's wife.
Karen Lee (李焯寧)	Kin Hei 見 喜	Ng Mo-Yung's personal maid.

== Viewership ratings ==
	Week	Episode	Average Points	Peaking Points	References
1	November 28 - December 2, 2005	1 — 5	30	35	
2	December 5–9, 2005	6 — 10	29	—	
3	December 12–16, 2005	11 — 15	29	32	
4	December 19–23, 2005	16 — 20	28	—	
5	December 26–30, 2005	21 — 25	30	—	
