= Forensic Heroes =

Hong Kong television series

- 法證先鋒
- Genre: Police procedural
- Starring: Bobby Au-Yeung; Frankie Lam; Yoyo Mung; Linda Chung; Raymond Cho; Florence Kwok
- Opening theme: "天網" performed by Frankie Lam
- Country of origin: Hong Kong
- Original language: Cantonese
- No. of episodes: 25

Production
- Running time: 45 minutes (approx.)

Original release
- Network: TVB
- Release: June 13 – July 16, 2006

Related
- Forensic Heroes II (2008); Forensic Heroes III (2011); Forensic Heroes IV (2020); Forensic Heroes V (2022); Forensic Heroes VI: Redemption (2024)

Forensic Heroes (Traditional Chinese: 法證先鋒) is a TVB modern suspense series broadcast in June, 2006, starring Bobby Au-Yeung, Frankie Lam, Yoyo Mung, Linda Chung, Raymond Cho and Florence Kwok in the first instalment of the Forensic Heroes series.

Three additional indirect sequels were released in 2011, 2020 and 2022 with a new cast.

In 2022, the drama was selected as one of the ten classic TVB dramas being honored for a new joint Youku and TVB program.

== Synopsis ==
The plot for Forensic Heroes contains a mixture of various themes. The mysteries include "Who Killed Tim Sir's wife?", "The Tai Po Corpse", "Murders for Justice", and "Where is Tim Sir?". The series include many serial killers. However, of all the crimes, there were two very important ones.

"Who Killed Tim Sir's Wife?" had two possible suspects, however, the murderer turns out to be a nurse who accidentally poisoned the victim. This breaks Tim's heart, but it is still a lucky chance for him as he falls in love with Siu-Yau.

"Where is Tim Sir?" was the last and most important mystery. A clown, Tracy's only true friend, abducted Tim. The clown puts Tim in a port container with seemingly limited air and food supply, no water, and a camera connected to a laptop, stored in a disc. Every day, new clips are sent to Forensics that show Tim trying to create a fire to attract the rescuers using friction. But Forensics has only three days to find Tim before he dies of thirst and hunger. Siu-Yau is especially worried and fearful, as she has fallen in love with him. The clown is caught and brought to Forensics to be interrogated, but before any information is extracted from him, he commits suicide.

While Forensics is searching, Siu-Yau looks at the laptop screen with Sam. The lights light the container up dimly, and a small hole is seen on the container. This sparks new hope in Siu-Yau and Sam, who check the position of the sun and find out where Tim is. Still, that does not narrow Tim's location down enough. Tim is wearing a watch that could reflect sunlight coming through the hole and start a small fire, which the rescuers would see. They are unaware that Tim is waiting to die.

Tim sees his wife, Charlie, in a dream. She asks him what he is doing in the world of the dead. Tim says that he is ready to give up and leave the earth. However, Charlie tells him she is sure he can do it and leaves. He returns to reality for a short moment, but is soon back in the dream.

This time, Tim dreams of his true love, Siu-Yau. He says he is tired of suffering on earth, but Siu-Yau holds his hands and tells him others are waiting for him, and he has to pull through. This gives Tim enough confidence to raise his arm to the sunlight, and start a fire. The Air Force, which is helping to find Tim Sir, finds him in a container. Tim is hospitalized, and he tells Siu-Yau that his vision of her made him keep on going rather than giving up. Siu-Yau rejects Tim. Ding-Ding and Sam decide to buy a house together and is it there that Sam proposes to Ding-Ding. There is a party to celebrate the wedding of Ding-Ding and Sam. There, Siu-Yau finally faces her true feelings for the man she loves and accepts a date from Tim. Just then, Tim and Sam's phones ring, and they are called off for a case.

== Cast ==
=== Main cast ===
Cast	Role	Description
Bobby Au-Yeung (歐陽震華)	Ko Yin-Pok (Timothy) 高彥博	Forensic Laboratory Supervisor / Senior Chemist. Koo Chak-Yiu's husband. Leung Siu-Yau's boyfriend. Koo Chak-Sum's best friend. Lam Pui Pui's ex-boyfriend.
Frankie Lam (林文龍)	Koo Chak-Sum (Sam) 古澤琛	Senior Forensic Pathologist / Mystery Writer. Lam Ding-Ding's boyfriend. Ko Yin-Pok's best friend. Koo Chak-Yiu's younger brother.
Yoyo Mung (蒙嘉慧)	Leung Siu-Yau (Nicole) 梁小柔	Kowloon West D.C.S. Senior Inspector of Police. Ko Yin-Pok's girlfriend.
Linda Chung (鍾嘉欣)	Lam Ding-Ding 林汀汀	Forensic Technician. Lam Pui-Pui's younger sister. Koo Chak-Sum's girlfriend.
Raymond Cho (曹永廉)	Sum Hung 沈雄	Kowloon West D.C.S. Sergeant.
Florence Kwok (郭少芸)	Mok Suk-woon (Yvonne) 莫淑媛	Senior Scientific Evidence Officer (SSEO).
Astrid Chan (陳芷菁)	Lam Pui-Pui 林沛沛	Lam Ding-Ding's elder sister. Ko Yin-Pok's ex-girlfriend.
Vivien Yeo (楊秀惠)	Ling Sum-Yi (Josie) 凌心怡	Kowloon West D.C.S. Police Constable.

=== Other cast ===
Cast	Role	Description
Fred Cheng (鄭俊弘)	Leung Siu-Kong 梁小剛	Forensic Technician; Leung Siu-Yau's younger brother.
Ku Feng (谷峰)	Ko Tong 高通	Ko Yin-Pok's father.
Yu Yang (于洋)	Leung Hing-Lung 梁興隆	Leung Siu-Yau and Leung Siu-Kong's father.
Oscar Leung (梁烈唯)	Ching Wai-Shing (Edwin) 程偉勝	Kowloon West D.C.S. Police Constable.
Eddie Li (李雨陽)	Lau Tsun-Sek (Terence) 劉俊碩	Kowloon West D.C.S. Police Constable.
Lau Kam-Ling (劉錦玲)	Koo Chak-Yiu (Charlie) 古澤瑤	Ko Yin-Pok's wife. Koo Chak-Sum's elder sister. Passed away in Ep.5.

=== Guest starring ===
Cast	Role	Description
Ngo Ka-nin (敖嘉年)	Tam Wai-Sing 譚偉昇	Tam Lai-Ling's brother.
Yoyo Chen (陳自瑤)	Tam Lai-Ling (Ling) 譚麗玲	Chan Man-Dik's girlfriend. Tam Wai-Sing's sister.
Lai Lok-yi (黎諾懿)	Chan Man-Dik 陳文狄	Tam Lai-Ling's boyfriend.
Jack Wu (胡諾言)	Ho Yiu-Kwong 何耀光	Pimp.
Natalie Tong (唐詩詠)	Chiu Suet-Man (Mon) 趙雪敏	Had a crush on Koo Chak-Sum.
Vin Choi (蔡淇俊)	To Siu-Wai (Joe) 杜少威	Chiu Suet-Man's ex-boyfriend.
Fala Chen (陳法拉)	Yung Wai 容慧	Red's girlfriend Introduced in Ep.10.
Johnson Lee (李思捷)	Red	Yung Wai's boyfriend.
Mat Yeung (揚明)	Mok Cheuk-Ho (Frankie) 莫卓浩	
Felix Lok (駱應鈞)	Mok Wai-To 莫偉圖	Businessman; Mok Cheuk-Ho's uncle.
Casper Chan (陳凱怡)	Ella Yu	Model; Lum Sum-Yi's cousin.
Mark Kwok (郭耀明)	Law Wah-Kin (Chris) 羅華健	Mok Suk-Woon's ex-husband.
Makbau Mak (麥長青)	Lam Siu-Chung (Kenny) 林少聰	Leung Siu-Yau's ex-boyfriend.
Charmaine Li (李思欣)	Tracy	So Chi-Man's lover. Had a crush on Koo Chak Sum.
Ellesmere Choi (蔡子健)	So Chi-Man (Danny) 蘇志文	Had a crush on Tracy.

== Viewership ratings ==
	Week	Episode	Average Points	Peaking Points	References
1	June 13–16, 2006	1 — 4	28	30	
2	June 19–23, 2006	5 — 9	30	32	
3	June 26–30, 2006	10 — 14	32	36	
4	July 3–7, 2006	15 — 19	34	38	
5	July 10–14, 2006	20 — 24	37	39	
5	July 16, 2006	25	41	43	
