= Fred Cheng =

Hong Kong musician

Fred Cheng 鄭俊弘
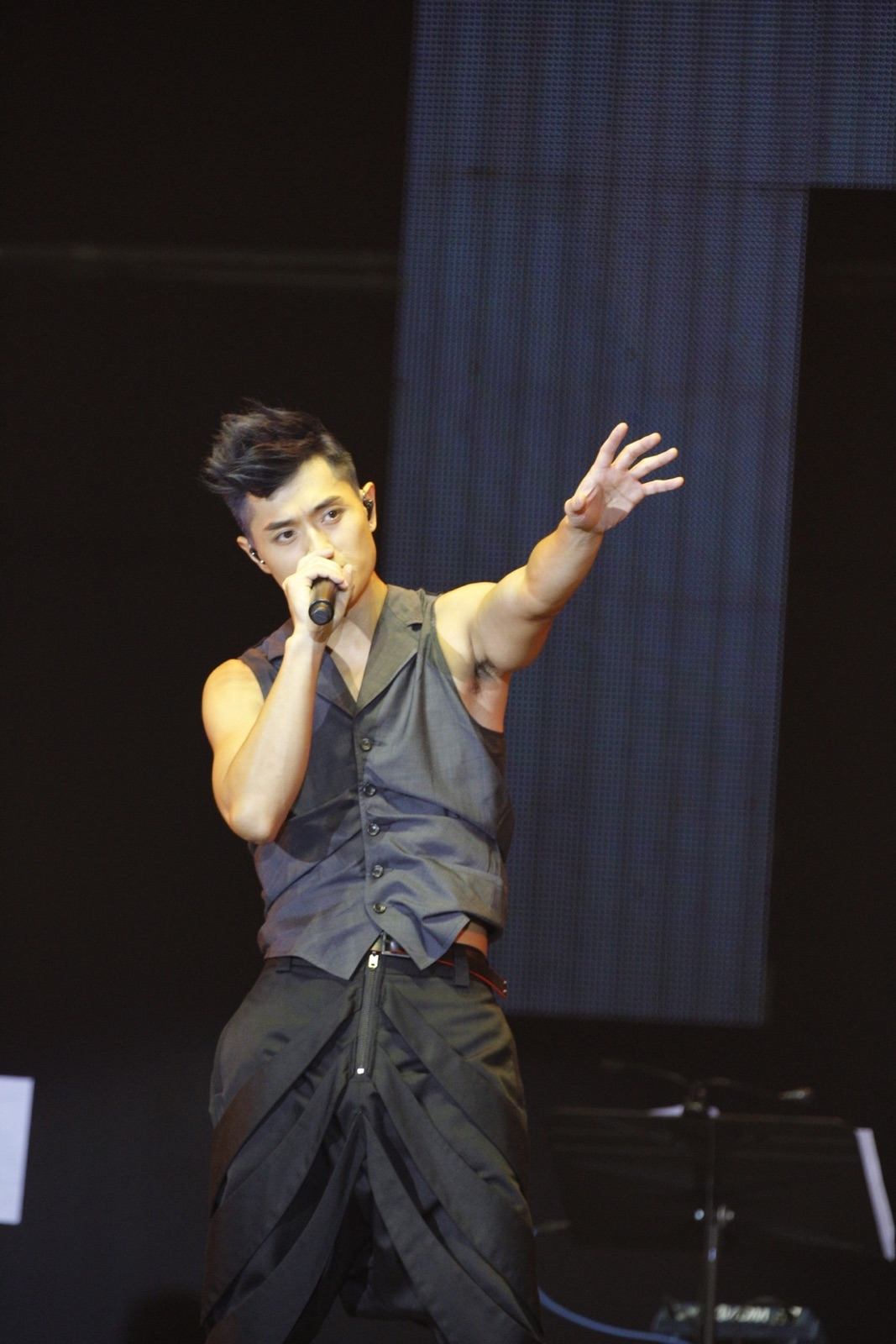
- Cheng in 2015
- Born: Frederick Cheng; Vancouver, British Columbia, Canada
- Other names: fred; freddie; freddy; panda baby; panda fred
- Occupations: Musician; actor
- Years active: 2001–present
- Spouse: Stephanie Ho (m. 2020)
- Children: 1
- Awards: 2015 TVB Star Awards Malaysia – My Favorite TVB Drama Theme Song; 2015 Captain of Destiny – 揚帆
- Musical career
- Origin: Hong Kong
- Genre: Cantopop
- Instruments: Vocals; guitar; electric bass; piano
- Labels: TVB (2001–present); Voice Entertainment→TVB Music Group (2013–2020, 2021–present)

Chinese name
- Traditional Chinese: 鄭俊弘
Transcriptions
Standard Mandarin
- Hanyu Pinyin: Zhèng Jùnhóng
Yue: Cantonese
- Jyutping: Zeng4 Zeon3 Wang4

Frederick "Fred" Cheng (Chinese: 鄭俊弘) is a Canadian-born Hong Kong musician and actor. He rose to fame after competing and winning the 2013 Hong Kong singing competition, Voice of the Stars. He is currently signed to TVB management.

== Early life and career ==
Cheng was born in Vancouver, British Columbia, Canada. Upon graduating from Eric Hamber Secondary School, he returned to Hong Kong. In 2001, Cheng's mother persuaded him to compete in the TVB New Talent Singing Awards, in which he won second place. Cheng was offered a contract with the record company Capital Artists, but after two months of training, the company stopped producing music. In 2003, TVB offered Cheng an artiste contract and offered him a role in the TVB drama Shine On You. He had starred in numerous television dramas, including Shine On You, Love Bond, The Charm Beneath and Forensic Heroes.

In 2011, Cheng signed a management contract with TVB.

In July 2013, Cheng competed in the inaugural season of the singing competition, The Voice of the Stars. He went on to win the competition, winning 68% of the votes. Immediately after winning, was announced that Cheng would be singing the theme song with Kristal Tin for the drama Return of the Silver Tongue.

On 15 November 2013, Cheng signed with TVB's newly established record company Voice Entertainment and released his debut solo album in the summer of 2014. He released his first single, "Nobody", on 24 March 2014 and within 5 hours it became the top selling single on Hong Kong iTunes and held the record for seven days. Subsequently, he was given a chance to sing another two theme songs for TVB dramas, The Ultimate Addiction and Ghost Dragon of Cold Mountain. He also won numerous Best New Artiste awards in 2014.

In March 2017, Cheng starred as the second male lead along with experienced and well-known actor, Gallen Lo in TVB drama 'Provocateur'.

After winning the VOS, Cheng has been given more job opportunities by TVB in acting, singing and commercial advertisements. He has performed events for companies including Towngas, Hopewell Holdings, New World Development, Shanghai Commercial Bank, AIA Group Limited, Swatch Group, Grand Lisboa, and P&G. Cheng also filmed for a number of commercial advertisements of companies such as Wellcome, P&G and Magic Smile B1.

On 15 September 2014 Cheng released his first album Story of Panda. It reached number one on multiple sales charts within one week.

Fred Cheng admitted in an interview that due to his upbringing in Canada, his Chinese literacy skills are limited to various levels despite having studied the language for three years. He mentioned when he first entered the TVB industry in the 2000s and had to sing the Chinese lyrics his managers provided to him, he had to utilize the Chinese-English dictionary to understand the content which he mentioned he could comprehend about 60% at most.

== Personal life ==
On 6 April 2017, Cheng admitted his relationship with fellow singer, Stephanie Ho. On 1 January 2020, the couple announced their engagement along with pre-wedding photos on Instagram, also revealing Cheng had proposed while they were on holiday in Thailand. The couple got married on 7 November 2020 and held their wedding at Hyatt Regency Sha Tin, Hong Kong.

On 13 January 2022, Ho announced on Instagram that she was pregnant. On 4 June, the couple announced on Instagram that their son, Asher Douglas Cheng, was born on 1 June. On his second birthday, the couple revealed Asher had been diagnosed with Angelman syndrome.

== Discography ==
=== Soundtrack appearances ===
| Year | Song | Drama | Type |
|---|---|---|---|
| 2013 | "Two Words" (duet with Kristal Tin) | Return of the Silver Tongue | theme |
| 2014 | "Challenge" | The Ultimate Addiction | theme |
| 2014 | "Way Back Home" | Ghost Dragon of Cold Mountain | theme |
| 2014 | "Place" | Overachievers | sub |
| 2014 | "Surrender" | Overachievers | ending |
| 2014 | "Rebel" | Officer Geomancer | theme |
| 2015 | "Walk With Love" | Come Home Love 2 | theme |
| 2015 | "Sailing" | Captain of Destiny | theme |
| 2016 | "Line of Fire" | My Dangerous Mafia Retirement Plan | theme |
| 2017 | "Lost" | Destination Nowhere | ending |
| 2017 | "The End of the World" | Provocateur | ending |
| 2017 | "With All My Heart" (duet with Stephanie Ho) | Married but Available | theme |
| 2017 | "The Night You Leave" | My Dearly Sinful Mind | ending |
| 2017 | "Payback" | Bet Hur | theme |
| 2017 | "Conquer" | A General, a Scholar and a Eunuch | theme |
| 2018 | "Turn Over" | Daddy Cool | theme |
| 2018 | "Faith" | The Stunt | theme |
| 2018 | "Fearless" | Life on the Line | theme |
| 2019 | "Hardhearted" | The Defected | theme |
| 2019 | "Choice" | Big White Duel | theme |
| 2020 | "Chase for" | Of Greed and Ants | theme |
| 2020 | "No Tears" | Forensic Heroes IV | sub |
| 2020 | "Blood And Tears" | Airport Strikers | theme |
| 2020 | "Confessions" | Brutally Young | theme |
| 2020 | "Who Are You" | On-Lie Game | theme |
| 2020 | "The Mystery" | The Witness | theme |
| 2021 | "Against the Wind" | The Runner | theme |
| 2021 | "Right or Wrong" | Shadow of Justice | theme |

=== Collaborations ===
- 2013 TVB 46th Anniversary Celebration Theme Song – "Always Getting Better"
- 2014 FIFA World Cup Theme Song – "We Are the Only One" (Various Artists Chorus)
- 2014 TVB J2 Channel Song – "Vibrant Heart"

== Awards ==
=== Jade Solid Gold Top 10 Awards ===
The Jade Solid Gold Songs Awards Ceremony is held annually in Hong Kong since 1984. The awards are based on Jade Solid Gold show on TVB.

| Year' | Award Programme | Name of Award | Result |
|---|---|---|---|
| 2014 | Jade Solid Gold 1st Half Season Selection 2014 | – Top 20 Best Songs – "Nobody" | Won |
| 2014 | Jade Solid Gold 2nd Half Season Selection 2014 | – Top 20 Best Songs – "Panda" | Won |

=== Hong Kong TVB8 Awards ===
The Hong Kong TVB8 Awards are given annually by TVB8, since 1999, a Mandarin television network operated by Television Broadcasts Limited.

| Year | Award Programme | Name of Award | Result |
|---|---|---|---|
| 2014 | TVB8 Awards Presentation 2014 | – Top 10 Best Songs – "Panda" (Mandarin) | Won |
| 2014 | TVB8 Awards Presentation 2014 | – Best Newcomer | Gold |

=== TVB Star Awards 2014 ===
TVB Star Awards Malaysia is organised by TVB to present awards to actors and actresses for their achievements.

| Year | Award Programme | Name of Award | Result |
|---|---|---|---|
| 2014 | TVB Malaysia Star Awards 2014 | – Malaysia Most Rising Star | Won |

=== Commercial Radio Hong Kong Ultimate Song Chart Awards ===
The Ultimate Song Chart Awards Presentation (叱咤樂壇流行榜頒獎典禮) is a cantopop award ceremony from one of the famous channel in Commercial Radio Hong Kong known as Ultimate 903 (FM 90.3).

| Year | Award Programme | Name of Award | Result |
|---|---|---|---|
| 2015 | Commercial Radio Billboard Ultimate Music Awards 2014 | – Best Newcomer | Bronze |

=== RTHK Top 10 Gold Songs Awards ===
The RTHK Top 10 Gold Songs Awards Ceremony(zh:十大中文金曲頒獎音樂會) is held annually in Hong Kong since 1978. The awards are determined by Radio and Television Hong Kong based on the work of all Asian artists (mostly cantopop) for the previous year.

| Year | Award Programme | Name of Award | Result |
|---|---|---|---|
| 2015 | 37th Top Ten Chinese Gold Songs Awards 2014 | – The Most Promising Newcomer | Gold |

=== Metro Showbiz Hit Awards ===
The Metro Showbiz Hit Awards (新城勁爆頒獎禮) is held in Hong Kong annually by Metro Showbiz radio station. It focuses mainly in cantopop music.

| Year | Award Programme | Name of Award | Result |
|---|---|---|---|
| 2014 | Metro Music World Hit Awards 2014 | – Ultimate Best Newcomer Male – Ultimate Best Newcomer of the Year – Metro Radio Original Song "Panda" | Won |
| 2015 | Metro Radio Station Children's Songs Awards 2014 | – Top Ten Song "Nobody" – Best Song "Nobody" | Won |

=== Metro Radio Mandarin Music Awards ===
| Year | Award Programme | Name of Award | Result |
|---|---|---|---|
| 2014 | Metro Music Mandarin Hit Awards 2014 | – Ultimate Newcomer, Hong Kong | Won |

=== IFPI Hong Kong Sales Awards ===
IFPI Awards is given to artists base on the sales in Hong Kong at the end of the year.

| Year | Award Programme | Name of Award | Result |
|---|---|---|---|
| 2015 | IFPI Awards Presentation 2014 | – Top Selling Cantonese Album – Best Selling Male Newcomer Album – Top Ten Digital Single Sale – "Panda" | Won |

=== Other awards ===
| Year | Award Programme | Name of Award | Result |
|---|---|---|---|
| 2013 | Yahoo Asia Buzz Awards Ceremony 2013 | King of Popularity 2013 | Won by 1,000,625 votes |
| 2013 | Sexiest Man Alive in China 2013 (Organized by Jaynestars.com) | The Most Sexiest Man Alive in China 2013 | Won by 5,483 votes (22%) |
| 2014 | Sina Weibo Awards Presentation 2013 | Weibo Newcomer Award | Won |
| 2014 | Yahoo Asia Buzz Awards Ceremony 2014 | Music New Force Award 2014 | Won |
| 2014 | Music Pioneer Billboard Annual Awards Ceremony 2014 | Pioneer Best Newcomer, Hong Kong | Won |
| 2014 | 10th Global Chinese Music Festival | Ultimate Newcomer 2014 | Won |

== Filmography ==
=== Television dramas ===
| Year | Title | Role | Notes |
|---|---|---|---|
| 2005 | My Family | Director's assistant | |
| 2005 | Love Bond | Kei Chung-ming | |
| 2005 | The Academy | Miki's friend | |
| 2005 | The Gentle Crackdown | Siu Chuen | |
| 2005 | The Herbalist's Manual | (extra) | |
| 2005 | Women on the Run | (extra) | |
| 2005 | Life Made Simple | Student | |
| 2005 | The Charm Beneath | Ning Tin-long | |
| 2005 | When Rules Turn Loose | Chung Ka-ming | |
| 2005 | Guts of Man | (extra) | |
| 2005 | Riches and Stitches | (extra) | |
| 2006 | Forensic Heroes | Leung Siu-gong | Supporting Role |
| 2006 | The Master of Tai Chi | Siu Kwong | |
| 2006 | Welcome to the House | DHL employee | |
| 2007 | The Brink of Law | Nurse | |
| 2007 | Ten Brothers | Photographer | |
| 2007 | On the First Beat | Chiu Tai-lui | |
| 2007 | The Green Grass of Home | Danny | |
| 2007 | Fathers and Sons | Law Tin-fu | |
| 2007 | The Ultimate Crime Fighter | CID | |
| 2007 | The Building Blocks of Life | Alan | |
| 2007 | Survivor's Law II | Forensic pathologist | |
| 2008 | Forensic Heroes II | Leung Siu-gong | Supporting Role |
| 2008 | When Easterly Showers Fall on the Sunny West | Trickster | |
| 2008 | Pages of Treasures | Yuen Yat-hei | |
| 2009 | Off Pedder | David Yeung | Episodes 126 & 127 |
| 2009 | The Threshold of a Persona | Gary Lam Ying-tin | |
| 2009 | E.U. | Chiu Tai-lui | |
| 2009 | A Watchdog's Tale | Kwok Wing | |
| 2010 | Cupid Stupid | Samuel Mak Chiu-jun | |
| 2010 | When Lanes Merge | Alex Cheung Yiu-ming | |
| 2010 | Ghost Writer | Sung Chuen | |
| 2010 | Mysteries of Love | Hui Jun-bong | Episodes 16 & 17 |
| 2010 | Can't Buy Me Love | Wing On | |
| 2010 | Some Day | Jun Jai | |
| 2011 | Relic of an Emissary | Lau Chung-leung | |
| 2011 | Yes, Sir. Sorry, Sir! | Cheung Hau-ming | Episodes 9, 11 |
| 2011 | Only You | Heung Wai-ho | Episodes 20 & 21 |
| 2011 | Grace Under Fire | Ma Sum | |
| 2011 | Gloves Come Off | Liu Fat | |
| 2011 | The Life and Times of a Sentinel | Bugino Yan-jaak | |
| 2011 | River of Wine | Shun | |
| 2011 | Til Love Do Us Lie | Guitarist | Episode 75 |
| 2011 | When Heaven Burns | Guitarist and vocalist | |
| 2012 | The Greatness of a Hero | Cho-hon | Episodes 4 & 5 |
| 2012 | Three Kingdoms RPG | (extra) | |
| 2012 | The Confidant | Lee Wing-ling | |
| 2013 | Missing You | Sam Yeung Hok-lai | Episodes 13, 16–20 |
| 2013 | The Day of Days | Kwok Chi-him | Guest star |
| 2013 | Beauty at War | Master Leung | Guest star |
| 2013 | Karma Rider | Sai Chui | |
| 2013 | Triumph in the Skies II | Water Yau Tin-hing | Cameo Appearance |
| 2013 | Return of the Silver Tongue | Choi Dor-wah | Performed theme song with Kristal Tin – "兩句" (Two Words) |
| 2014 | Ruse of Engagement | Eric Lee Kam | |
| 2014 | Swipe Tap Love | Background singer | Cameo Appearance |
| 2014 | Come On Cousin! | Fred Cheng | Guest Appearance |
| 2014 | Overachievers | Ko Hing | Supporting Role |
| 2014 | Officer Geomancer | Che Kwai-kwan | Major Supporting Role |
| 2017 | Provocateur | Ringo Poon Siu-kit | Main Role |
| 2020 | Forensic Heroes IV | Charm Ting | Major Supporting Role |
| 2021 | Armed Reaction 2021 | Danny Ching Bak-keung | Major Supporting Role |
| 2021 | Fraudstars | Yip Lap-tak | Supporting Role |
| 2022 | Ghost Cleansing Ltd | Hung Yat-hei | Main Role |
| 2022 | Go with the Float | Yuen Chik | Major Supporting Role |
| 2022 | Forensic Heroes V | Charm Ting | Major Supporting Role |
| 2024 | In Bed With A Stranger | Alex Ling Chun-shing | Major Supporting Role |
