= Frankie Lam =

Hong Kong actor

- Lam in 2019
- Born: 19 December 1967 (age 58); Hong Kong
- Occupation: Actor
- Years active: 1989–present
- Spouse: Kenix Kwok (m. 2004)
- Children: 1

Chinese name
- Traditional Chinese: 林文龍
- Simplified Chinese: 林文龙
Transcriptions
Standard Mandarin
- Hanyu Pinyin: Lín Wèn Lóng
Yue: Cantonese
- Jyutping: Lam Man Lung

Francis Lam Man-lung (born 19 December 1967) is a Hong Kong actor. He entered a singing contest and subsequently, signed a contract with TVB. He left TVB in 2011 to join HKTV.

Lam married Hong Kong actress Kenix Kwok on 10 March 2004. Their first child, daughter Tania Lam Tin-yeuk, was born on 14 January 2010.

On May 18, 2015, Lam announced he will join and invest in Global Saga, a film company established by Tony Wong and Rachel Lam. The first film from the company, The Merger was released in 2015.

On 23 December 2019, Lam was appointed to be Vice President of Asia Television Limited.

== Filmography ==
=== Television series ===
Year	Title	Role	Notes
1989	Looking Back in Anger	Rich classmate 1	
1990	Brother Cry for Me		
1990	The Challenge of Life		
1991	Beyond Trust		
1991	Drifters	Hong Fung	
1992	Revelation of the Last Hero	Yiu Lik-hang	
1992	Romance Beyond	Chai Dat-Chung	
1992	The Change of Time	Yong Man-Hoi	
1994	The Holy Dragon Saga		Released overseas, broadcast on TVB Jade Channel in 1995
1995	Down Memory Lane	Wong Shan	
1995	Before Dawn		
1997	Coincidentally	Tong Chin-Pang	
1999	Witness to a Prosecution	Sung Yik/ Fong Jun	
2000	Incurable Traits	Wah To	
2001	On the Track or Off		
2001	Colourful Life	Ching Chi-Hin	
2001	Virtues of Harmony	Kam Nin	
2003	Virtues of Harmony II	Kam Nin (Chris)	
2003	Armed Reaction IV	Kong Ji-Kin (Ken)	Released overseas, broadcast on TVB Jade Channel in 2004
2005	The Herbalist's Manual	Lee See-Jan	
2005	Ten Brothers	Chan Dai-Ha	
2006	Forensic Heroes	Koo Chak-Sum (Dr. Koo/Sam)	
2006	Face to Fate	Li-Po-Yee	
2008	Forensic Heroes II	Koo Chak-Sum (Dr. Koo/Sam)	
2010	Beauty's Rival in Palace	Jin Wangsun	
2014	More Than Healing		Episode 1
2015	Hidden Faces	Cheuk Tin-Nam	
2015	Night Shift	Heman	
2017	My Unfair Lady	Man Nim-Sam (Gordon)	
2018	Another Era	Ko Chit (Duncan)	
2020	Life After Death	Keung Yuk-Sing	

=== Film ===
- Tour of Revenge (1989)
- Running on Empty (1991)
- Behind the Mask (1993)
- Tears and Triumph (1994)
- Now You See Me Now You Don't (1994)
- The Dragon Chronicles - The Maidens (1994)
- From the Same Family (1995)
- Born to be Wild (1995)
- Lethal Match (1996)
- The Fatalist (1996)
- Godmother of Monkok (1997)
- To Kiss is Fatal (1998)
- The First Stone (2013)
- The Merger (2015)
- Cold War 2 (2016)
