= Mui Siu-ching =

Hong Kong television producer

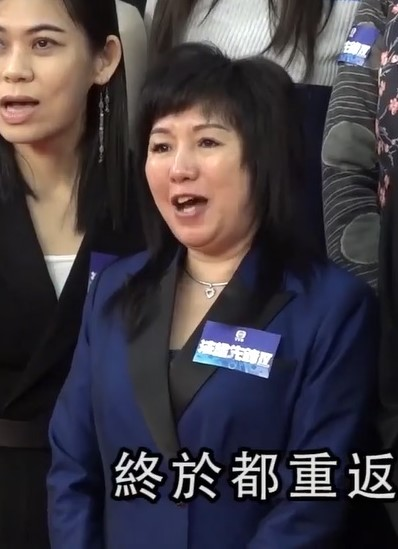
- Mui in 2018
- Born: September 27, 1953 (age 71); British Hong Kong
- Occupations: Producer; presenter
- Spouse: Lau Kar-ho (m. 1981)

Chinese name
- Traditional Chinese: 梅小青
Transcriptions

Mui Siu-ching (Chinese: 梅小青, born September 27, 1953) is a Hong Kong television producer for a long time associated with television station TVB, beginning her career as a producer with rival broadcaster ATV she moved to TVB in 1987 and has since then been responsible for numerous series including well received series such as The Breaking Point, The Legendary Ranger, Where the Legend Begins, Family Man, Shine on You, the Forensic Heroes franchise, Beyond the Realm of Conscience & Deep in the Realm of Conscience. Believing that popular television can touch and influence the populace in Hong Kong, her series revolve around the themes of good and evil.

Her younger sister is the TVB actress and television host Cutie Mui, and her husband is fellow TVB producer Lau Kar-ho. In March 2012, she ended her 25-year association with TVB when both she and her husband signed to rival station Now TV. In 2016, she returned to TVB with her husband. In February 2020, she announced her retirement.

== Work as a producer ==
=== Rediffusion Television series ===
==== 1980s ====
Year of first broadcast	Series name
1982	(愛情跑道)
1982	Cheap Detective (凹凸神探)
1982	(老婆越老越可愛)

=== Asia Television Limited series ===
==== 1980s ====
Year of first broadcast	Series name
1983	(邊緣十八)
1983	(洋蔥花)
1983	(家姐細佬飛髮舖)
1984	(小生也瘋狂)
1984	(毋忘我)
1984	(101拘捕令第二輯之熱線 999)
1984	(101拘捕令第三輯之勇敢新世界)
1985	(住家男人)
1985	(十兄弟)
1985	(三世人)
1986	(滿堂紅)
1986	(柔情點38)
1986	(通靈)

=== TVB series ===
==== 1980s ====
Year of first broadcast	Series name
1987	(人海綠皮書)
1988	(飛躍霓裳)
1989	(決戰皇城)
1989	Two of a Kind (淘氣雙子星)
1989	(回到唐山)

==== 1990s ====
Year of first broadcast	Series name
1990	(天上凡間)
1991	The Breaking Point(今生無悔)
1992	(破繭邊緣)
1992	Being Twins (兄兄我我)
1993	The Legendary Ranger (原振俠)
1994	(成日受傷的男人)
1994	Shade of Darkness (異度凶情)
1995	From Act to Act(娛樂插班生)
1997	Working Women(當女人愛上男人)
1997	Show Time Blues([樂壇插班生)
1997	I Can't Accept Corruption(廉政追緝令)
1998	As Sure As Fate(師奶強人)
1998	Moments of Endearment(外父唔怕做)
1999	Ultra Protection(非常保鑣)
1999	(命轉情真)

==== 2000s ====
Year of first broadcast	Series name
2000	When Dreams Come True (夢想成真)
2001	Colourful Life (錦繡良緣)
2002	Where the Legend Begins (洛神)
2002	Family Man (絕世好爸)
2003	Better Halves (金牌冰人)
2004	Shine on You (青出於藍)
2005	Love Bond (心花放)
2005	The Charm Beneath (胭脂水粉)
2006	Forensic Heroes (法證先鋒)
2007	The Brink of Law (突圍行動)
2007	Fathers and Sons (爸爸閉翳)
2008	Forensic Heroes II (法證先鋒II)
2008	Pages of Treasures (Click入黃金屋)
2009	Beyond the Realm of Conscience (宮心計)

==== 2010s ====
Year of first broadcast	Series name
2010	Can't Buy Me Love (公主嫁到)
2011	Forensic Heroes III (法證先鋒III)
2012	Daddy Good Deeds (當旺爸爸)
2018	Deep in the Realm of Conscience (宮心計2深宮計)

==== 2020s ====
Year of first broadcast	Series name
2020	Forensic Heroes IV (法證先鋒IV)

== Awards ==
- 2010 Ming Pao outstanding crew award for Can't Buy Me Love
