= Jim Tang =

Hong Kong actor (born 1983)

- Born: 9 June 1983 (age 43); Hong Kong
- Years active: 2006–present

Chinese name
- Traditional Chinese: 鄧永健
- Simplified Chinese: 邓永健
Transcriptions
Standard Mandarin
- Hanyu Pinyin: Dèng Yǒngjiàn

Jim Tang Wing Kin (simplified Chinese: 邓永健; traditional Chinese: 鄧永健, born June 9, 1983, in Hong Kong with family roots in Panyu, Guangdong) is a Hong Kong actor.

Jim was a clown entertainer before he became an actor. He graduated from 20th TVB Artist Training Course in 2006 and he made his first appearance in The Price of Greed on TVB in 2006. He had starred in numerous MTVs and played different roles in TVB series. Jim caught the public's attention with his role as Gary in the Best Selling Secrets in 2007.

== Filmography ==
=== Television ===
- The Price of Greed (2006)
- Welcome To The House (2006)
- Maidens' Vow (2006)
- CIB Files (2006)
- A Change of Destiny (2007)
- The Drive of Life (2007)
- Best Selling Secrets (2007–2008)
- Off Pedder (2008–2010)
- The Threshold of a Persona (2009)
- Man in Charge (2009)
- The Beauty of the Game (2009)
- The Other Truth (2011)
- Forensic Heroes III (2011)
- L'Escargot (2012)
- The Last Steep Ascent (2012)
- Three Kingdoms RPG (2012)
- Come Home Love: Lo and Behold (2017)

=== Film ===
- I Love Hong Kong (2011)
