= Iris Wong =

Hong Kong actress

- Born: 18 March 1978 (age 48); British Hong Kong
- Other name: Miss Yellow
- Occupation: Actress
- Years active: 1999–2009

Chinese name
- Traditional Chinese: 黃泆潼
- Simplified Chinese: 黄泆潼
Transcriptions
Standard Mandarin
- Hanyu Pinyin: huang2 yi4 tong2
Yue: Cantonese
- Jyutping: wong4 jat6 tung4

Iris Wong Yat Tung (Chinese: 黃泆潼; born 18 March 1978) is a former actress in TVB with a partial contract. She was also one of the participant in Miss Hong Kong Pageant 1999. She also got a nickname called Miss Yellow since she became a disk jockey.

== Background ==
She was a part time model before participating the Miss Hong Kong Pageant. In 1997, she appeared on a music video from a song of Alan Tam. Afterwards, she acted as a supporting role in most dramas TVB, her notable works were including Scavengers' Paradise and Cupid Stupid. At that time, STAREAST was her agency company. In 2009, she changed her mind to become a disk jockey after she had left TVB.

Besides of her acting career, she also interests in musicals, especially including breakbeat、hip hop and R&B. In 2001, she created a pop group with Meini Cheung, Joey Chan (陳玟希), and Casper Chan, which called Travel 4 Super Girls .

== Filmography ==
=== Television series ===
- At the Threshold of an Era (TVB 2000)
- In the Realm of Success (TVB 2001)
- Life Begins at Forty (TVB 2003)
- Riches and Stitches (TVB 2003)
- War and Beauty (TVB 2004)
- Yummy Yummy (TVB 2005)
- Life Made Simple (TVB 2005)
- Scavengers' Paradise (TVB 2005)
- Safe Guards (TVB 2006)
- Glittering Days (TVB 2006)
- Welcome to the House (TVB 2006)
- The Brink of Law (TVB 2007)
- Heart of Greed (TVB 2007)
- The Ultimate Crime Fighter (TVB 2008)
- Speech of Silence (TVB 2008)
- Legend of the Demigods (TVB 2008)
- The Gem of Life (TVB 2008)
- Sweetness in the Salt (TVB 2009)
- The Threshold of a Persona (TVB 2009)
- Cupid Stupid (TVB 2010)
- A Great Way to Care (TVB 2011)

=== Film ===
- Hold You Tight (1998)
- Clean My Name, Mr. Coroner! (2000)
- Love Undercover (2002)
- Men Suddenly In Black (2003)
- Love Undercover 2 (2003)
- Dragon Loaded 2003 (2003)
- Honesty (2003)
- Love is a Many Stupid Thing (2004)
- Blood Brothers (2004)
- Silly Kung Fu Family (2004)
- Kung Fu Mahjong (2005)
