= Vin Choi =

Vin Choi Kay-Chun
- Born: Choi Chi Fung 蔡誌鋒; 23 May 1984 (age 42); Hong Kong
- Occupation: Actor
- Years active: 2003–present

Chinese name
Transcriptions
Standard Mandarin
- Hanyu Pinyin: cài qí jùn
Yue: Cantonese
- Jyutping: coi3 kei4 zeon3
- Musical career
- Also known as: Vin

Vincent Choi Kay-Chun (born 23 May 1984) is a Hong Kong actor under TVB.

== Biography ==
After graduating from high school in 2001, Vin entered a contest hosted by TVB Weekly and won first place. He enrolled in the 18th TVB artists training course in 2002 and took on a few tiny roles.

Vin's first major role happened in the series Sunshine Heartbeat, where he played Fong Lik.

In 2007, Vin took on another major role in the series Best Selling Secrets as Luk Chit.

== Filmography ==
=== TV series ===
Year	Title	Role	TVB Anniversary Awards	Notes
2003	Not Just A Pretty Face 《美麗在望》	Kitchen Staff		
2003	Aqua Heroes 《戀愛自由式》	-		
2003	Find the Light 《英雄刀少年》	Cheung Man Hung 張文雄		
2003	Hearts of Fencing 《當四葉草碰上劍尖時》	Fei Chun 肥俊		Cameo
2003	Triumph in the Skies 《衝上雲霄》	Hui Kong Shing 許光成		
2004	Lady Fan 《烽火奇遇結良緣》	Imperial Bodyguard 侍衛		
2004	To Love With No Regrets 《足秤老婆八兩夫》	West Door Officer 西門卿		
2004	A Handful of Love 《一屋兩家三姓人》	Choi Chi Chung 蔡志聰		
2004	Split Second 《爭分奪秒》	G4		
2004	To Catch the Uncatchable 《棟篤神探》	-		
2004	The Vigilante in the Mask 《怪俠一枝梅》	-		
2004	To Get Unstuck In Time 《隔世追凶》	shopper		
2004	Sunshine Heartbeat 《赤沙印記@四葉草.2》	Fong Lik 方 力		
2005	The Zone 《奇幻潮》	Tony		
2005	Revolving Doors of Vengeance 《酒店風雲》	Zing		
2006	Forensic Heroes 《法證先鋒》	Dou Siu Wai 杜少威		
2006	Welcome To The House 《高朋滿座》	Madison		Cameo
2007	The Brink of Law 《突圍行動》	Tung Yut Siu 童日昭		
2007-2008	Best Selling Secrets 《同事三分親》	Luk Gin/Luk Chit 陸堅/陸哲		
2009	Beyond the Realm of Conscience 《宮心計》	布小順		
2010	The Mysteries of Love 《談情說案》	Ko Cheung-ting		
2010	Some Day 《天天天晴》	Reporter / photographer		
2011	7 Days in Life 《隔離七日情》	Ng Tsz-chung		
2011	Only You 《只有您》	Chong Chung-leung, Leo		
2011	The Other Truth 《真相》	Leo		Ep. 8-10
2011	Forensic Heroes III 《法證先鋒III》	Choi Chun		
2011-2012	Bottled Passion 《我的如意狼君》	Tsui On		
2012	L'Escargot 《缺宅男女》	Kenny Ma		
2012	Three Kingdoms RPG 《回到三国》	Lau Cung		
2012	The Confidant 《大太監》	Yuk-jun		
2014	Ruse of Engagement 《叛逃》	Chung Ching-nam		
2014-2015	Tiger Cubs II 《飛虎II》	PC Lam Man-fai		
2023	Night Beauties 《一舞傾城》	Cheng Hong Kai		

=== TV show host ===
- After School ICU 放學ICU (TVB)
