= A Great Way to Care =

Hong Kong medical crime drama

- Promo poster
- 仁心解碼 & II
- Genre: Medical drama Crime thriller
- Written by: Kwan Chung-ling
- Starring: Alex Fong; Ben Wong; Ram Chiang; Kate Tsui; Raymond Wong Ho-yin; Tavia Yeung; Yoyo Mung; Edwin Siu; Aimee Chan
- Composer: Tang Chi-wai
- Country of origin: Hong Kong
- Original language: Cantonese
- No. of series: 2
- No. of episodes: 20 (1); 25 (2) (list of episodes)

Production
- Executive producer: Marco Law
- Camera setup: Multi camera
- Running time: 45 minutes
- Production company: TVB

Original release
- Network: Jade; HD Jade
- Release: 10 January 2011 – 19 April 2013

Related
- Reality Check; Beauty at War

A Great Way To Care is a Hong Kong medical crime drama television series produced by Marco Law and TVB. It stars Alex Fong as Dr. Ko Lap-yan, a senior psychiatrist who has a specialty in diagnosing mentally ill criminals.

Produced in 2008, the first series premiered on Malaysia's AOD on 8 June 2009. Originally scheduled for a summer 2009 release in Hong Kong, the broadcast of the series was put on hold after the success of Lee Tim-sing's period serial, Rosy Business. Lee's sister production, Sweetness in the Salt, was aired in place of A Great Way to Care.

With a total of 20 episodes, the series finally premiered on Jade in Hong Kong on 10 January 2011. A sequel series of 25 episodes was renewed in early 2012, and premiered on TVB's Jade and HD Jade channels on 18 March 2013.

== Series overview ==
Dr. Ko Lap-yan heads a team of senior psychiatrists and residents at the Yan Wo Hospital in Hong Kong. Most episodes revolve around the team diagnosing patients. With a specialty at diagnosing criminals, Ko also has close ties with the Serious Crime Unit of the Hong Kong Police Force, a unit headed by Senior Inspector Chung Kwon-ban. The second series sees Ko's resignation from the Yan Wo Hospital; he is later transferred to a new psychiatric department, the Forensics Psychiatry Department, of Bok On Hospital, where he formally diagnoses criminals.

== Cast and characters ==
Name	Portrayed by	Occupation	Series	
Name	Portrayed by	Occupation	1	2
Dr. Ko Lap-yan	Alex Fong	Senior Psychiatrist, Yan Wo's Department of Psychiatry (1); Consultant Psychiatrist, Bok On's Department of Forensics Psychiatry (2)	Main	
SIP Chung Kwok-ban	Ben Wong	Senior Inspector of Police at HKPF Serious Crime Unit	Main	
Dr. Sam C.S. Lin	Ram Chiang	Senior Psychiatrist, Yan Wo's Department of Psychiatry (1); Private Psychiatrist (2)	Main	
WPC Mandy M.Y. Mok	Kate Tsui	Police Constable at HKPF Serious Crime Unit	Main	Special guest
Dr. Henry W.H. Law	Cheung Kwok-keung	Senior Psychiatrist, Yan Wo's Department of Psychiatry (1); Head of Psychiatry Department at Bok On (2)	Supporting	Supporting
Lee Ying-chun	Raymond Wong Ho-yin	Psychiatric Nurse, Yan Wo's Department of Psychiatry	Main	
WPC Lam Chung-yan	Tavia Yeung	Police Constable at HKPF Serious Crime Unit		Main
Dr. Lois W.K. Cheuk	Yoyo Mung	Consultant Psychiatrist, Bok On's Department of Forensics Psychiatry		Main
Dr. Jackson K.W. Leung	Edwin Siu	Psychiatrist, Bok On's Department of Forensics Psychiatry		Main
Jade Y.C. Lai	Aimee Chan	Psychologist		Main
Dr. Sunny N.Y. Ho	Power Chan	Psychiatry Resident, Bok On's Department of Forensics Psychiatry		Supporting
Dr. Edgar S.B. Wong	Oscar Leung	Psychiatrist, Bok On's Department of Forensics Psychiatry		Supporting
Dr. Scarlett S.K. Chan	Christine Kuo	Psychiatrist, Bok On's Department of Forensics Psychiatry		Supporting
Dr. Ken Y.K. Luk	Eric Li	Psychiatrist, Bok On's Department of Forensics Psychiatry		Supporting
Dr. Lo Ying-kei	Li Shing-cheong	Senior Psychiatrist, Bok On's Department of Forensics Psychiatry		Supporting

=== Series 1 characters ===
==== Ko Family ====
Cast	Role	Description
Elliot Yue	Ko Sau Yee 高守義	A shopping centre security officer A retired policeman Ko Lap Pun and Ko Lap Yan's father Chiu Yuk Fan's ex-boyfriend Chung Kwok Bun's former supervisor
Joseph Lee	Ko Lap Pun 高立本	A bank assistant Ko Sau Yee's elder son Ko Lap Yan's elder brother Tang Yuen Han's husband Ko Ho Nam's uncle
Rachel Kan	Tang Yuen Han 鄧婉嫻	Ko Lap Pun's wife Ko Lik Hang's mother
Alex Fong	Ko Lap Yan 高立仁	Ko Yan; A psychiatrist Ko Sau Yee's younger son Ko Lap Pun's younger brother Ko Ho Nam's father Mok Man Yee's boyfriend
Max Ho	Ko Lik Hang 高力行	Ko Lap Pun and Tang Yuen Han's son
Kimmy Kwan	Ko Ho Nam 高可嵐	Ko Lap Yan's daughter Alan's ex-girlfriend

==== Lin Family ====
Cast	Role	Description
Chiu Man-tung	Lin Ching Tak 連正德	Cheung Yim Fong's husband Lin Chi Sum's father Deceased
Suet Nay	Cheung Yim Fong 章艷芳	A Canadian immigrant Lin Ching Tak's wife Lin Chi Sum's mother Had bipolar disorder and delusional disorder, finally recovered
Ram Chiang	Lin Chi Sum 連志森	A psychiatrist Lin Ching Tak and Cheung Yim Fong's son Ho Sau Wai's husband Lin Hiu Tung and Lin Ho Fai's father Resigned and self-operated a clinic in Chapter 20
Astrid Chan	Ho Sau Wai 何秀惠	A nurse Lin Chi Sum's wife Lin Hiu Tung and Lin Ho Fai's mother
Joey Mak	Lin Hiu Tung 連曉彤	Lin Chi Sum and Ho Sau Wai's elder daughter Lin Hiu Fai's elder sister
	Lin Hiu Fai 連曉輝	Lin Chi Sum and Ho Sau Wai's younger son Lin Hiu Fai's younger brother

===== Yan Wo Hospital =====
Cast	Role	Description
Kwok Tak-shun	Law Chi Ho 羅智灝	A psychiatrist superintendent Law Wing Hang, Ko Lap Yan and Lin Chi Sum's supervisor Retired in Episode 18
Cheung Kwok-keung	Law Wing Hang 羅永鏗	Henry; A psychiatrist, promoted to psychiatrist superintendent in Chapter 18; Tse Sze Nga's mistress Chan Kwong Leung's supervisor Law Chi Ho's subordinate
Alex Fong	Ko Lap Yan 高立仁	A psychiatrist Fong Wing Chun, Yu Kwan Wai and Cheng Sum Yau's supervisor Law Chi Ho's subordinate
Ram Chiang	Lin Chi Sum 連志森	A psychiatrist Law Chi Ho's subordinate Resigned and opened a private clinic in Episode 20
Ho Kam-nam	Lau Chi Pang 劉志鵬	A psychiatrist Lo Wing Hang's subordinate
Ellesmere Choi	Chan Kwong Leung 陳光亮	Brian; A practical psychiatrist, promoted to psychiatrist in Episode 20; Law Wing Hang's subordinate Mak Piu Shan's boyfriend Used to join "Ling Sum Church"
Ruco Chan	Fong Chun Fai 方榮俊	Leo; A practical psychiatrist Ko Lap Yan's subordinate
Timmy Hung	Yu Kwan Wai 余鈞緯	Nelson,Sartre; A practical psychiatrist Ko Lap Yan's subordinate
Yoyo Chen	Cheng Sum Yau 鄭心柔	Martha; A practical psychiatrist Ko Lap Yan's subordinate Cheng Sum Kit's elder sister
Coson Leung	Dr. Fok 霍醫生	A psychiatrist
Raymond Wong Ho-yin	Lee Ying Chun 李應春	A nurse Tina's ex-boyfriend Suen Ka Pik's boyfriend, later husband Resigned and emigrated to Singapore in Episode 20
Charles Szeto	Lee King Yip 李敬業	Shine; A nurse
Astrid Chan	Ho Sau Wai 何秀惠	A nurse
Suki Chui	Lui Wing Chi 呂詠之	Gigi; A nurse Mok Man Yee's friend
Iris Wong	Mak Pui Shan 麥佩珊	Daisy; A nurse Chan Kwong Leung's girlfriend Used to join "Ling Sum Church"
Irene Wong	Tse Sze Nga 謝思雅	Coco; A nurse Law Wing Hang's girlfriend Killed by Law Kwok Hung in Episode 17
June Chan	Lau Kit Po 劉潔寶	A nurse Law Kwok Hung's wife

===== Hong Kong Police CID =====
Cast	Role	Description
Ben Wong	Chung Kwok Bun 鍾國彬	Senior Inspector; Ko Sau Yee's former subordinate Mok Man Yee, Ho Yau Kin, Choi Kwai Hung, So Fung, Yip Pak Ho and Lo Sui Tat's supervisor
Kate Tsui	Mok Man Yee 莫敏兒	Monkey,Mandy; A police officer Mok Kwai San's granddaughter Chung Kwok Bun's subordinate Ko Lap Yan's girlfriend Lui Wing Chi's friend Had schizophrenia and somnambulism, finally recovered
Wong Ching	Ho Yau Kin 何宇堅	Police officers Chung Kwok Bun's subordinates
Joe Yau	Choi Kwai Hung 蔡季雄	Police officers Chung Kwok Bun's subordinates
Law Tin-chi	So Fung 蘇峰	Police officers Chung Kwok Bun's subordinates
Wu Kei-fung	Yip Pak Ho 葉柏豪	Police officers Chung Kwok Bun's subordinates
Yeung Ching-wa	Lo Sui Tat 魯瑞達	Police officers Chung Kwok Bun's subordinates

==== Medical cases ====
===== Post-traumatic stress disorder (Chapter 1) =====
Cast	Role	Description
Mary Hon		Chan Mei Kuen's Mother
Natalie Tong	Chan Mei Kuen 陳美娟	Ko Lap Yan's patient Almost being raped when she was young Had post-traumatic stress disorder

===== Antisocial personality disorder (Chapter 2–3) =====
Cast	Role	Description
Leung Kin-ping	Mr. Chan 陳主任	A sheltered workshop manager Chan Wai Chung's father
Oscar Leung	Chan Wai Chung 陳偉聰	A non-engaged youth Mr. Chan's son Had anti-social personality disorder Wounded several people by using knives in the street Bullied and threatened Tai Tsz Ho; Loved Apple (Villain)
Otto Chan	Tai Tsz Ho 戴子浩	Mentally disabled Bullied and threatened by Chan Wai Chung; Ho Lap Yan and Law Wing Hang's patient
Snow Suen	Apple	A cafe waitress Keung's girlfriend Chan Wai Chung's love interest
Kau Cheuk-lang	Keung 強	Apple's boyfriend

===== Compensated dating girl (Chapter 4–6) =====
Cast	Role	Description
Joseph Yeung	Lee Yiu Kwok 李耀國	Lee Tsz Yan's father A primary school principal Sexual assaulted his student Killed Tsui Chun Pong in Chapter 5 (Villain)
Wan Yu-hung		Lee Yiu Kwok's wife Lee Tsz Yan's mother Attempted suicide though survived in Chapter 5
Charmaine Li	Lee Tsz Yan 李芷欣	A secondary school student and a compensated dating girl Lee Yiu Kwok's daughter Yu Kwan Wai's patient Had major depressive disorder Forced to take naked photos by Tsui Chun Pong in Chapter 4 Died in a traffic accident in Chapter 5
Koo Ming-wah	Tsui Chun Pong 徐振邦	A garage owner Lee Tsz Yan's compensated dating customer Forced Lee Tsz Yan to take naked photos and threatened Lee Yiu Kwok; Killed by Lee Yiu Kwok in Chapter 5 (Villain)

===== Personality disorder (Chapter 6–9) =====
Cast	Role	Description
Ngo Ka-nin	Yuen Man Hon 阮文翰	Founder of Ling Sum Church; Lee Kiu's younger son Yuen Man Ho's younger twin brother Killed Shek Yik Kin, Tse Sin and Yuen Man Ho; Raped Poon Siu Man and Tse Sin; Had personality disorder (Villain)
–	Yuen Man Ho 阮文浩	Lee Kiu's elder son Yuen Man Hon's elder twin brother Killed by Yuen Man Hon
Tang Ying-man		Priest of Ling Sum Church (Villain)
Alice Fung So-bor	Lee Kiu 李嬌	A psychiatrist patient A chicken hawker Yuen Man Ho and Yuen Man Hon's mother Determined to kill themselves because of Yuen Man Hon's guilt in Chapter 9
Mandy Lam	Poon Siu Man 潘小敏	Follower of Ling Sum Church; Lin Chi Sum and Chan Kwong Leung's patient Raped by Yuen Man Hon and became pregnant Had schizophrenia and major depressive disorder
Yu Chi-ming		Poon Siu Man's father
Eric Chung	Shek Yik Kin 石憶健	A district councillor Tse Sin's husband Criticized Ling Sum Church in public Drenched with red paint in Chapter 6 Killed by Yuen Man Hon in Chapter 8
Janice Shum	Tse Sin 謝茜	Ex-follower of Ling Sum Church; Shek Yik Kin's wife Raped and killed by Yuen Man Hon in Chapter 8
Ellesmere Choi	Chan Kwong Leung 陳光亮	Brian; Ex-follower of Ling Sum Church
Iris Wong	Mak Pui Shan 麥佩珊	Daisy; Ex-follower of Ling Sum Church

===== Policemen Murders (Chapter 10–12) =====
Cast	Role	Description
Power Chan	Cheung Tsz Tung 張梓棟	Former policeman Cheung Mei Wan's father Chung Kwok Bun's former subordinate and laid off by him To Wing Hing's friend Had delusional disorder and believed he was an undercover agent. Used to be wanted by the police for the murders Determined to kill Liu Shun to revenge for To Wing Hing's death
Kwok Nga-shi	Cheung Mei Wan 張美雲	Cheung Tsz Tung's daughter Ko Lap Yan's patient Had psychosis
Lee Kai-kit	Liu Shun 廖順	Framed by Wan Kwong Ping and others for assaulting policemen and stealing police gun 8 years ago Killed To Wing Hing and Leung Chi Kau; Kidnapped Wan Kwong Ping (Villain); Arrested in Episode 12
–	Liu Fat 廖發	Liu Shun's brother Killed by Wan Kwong Ping 8 years ago
Siu Cheuk-yiu	Wan Kwong Ping 尹光柄	A retired policeman, now a restaurant owner Killed Liu Fat 8 years ago Framed Liu Shun for assaulting policemen and stealing police gun 8 years ago Kidnapped by Liu Shun in Chapter 12
–	To Wing Hing 陶永慶	A policeman Cheung Tsz Tung's friend and gave financial assistance to him Framed Liu Shun for assaulting policemen and stealing police gun 8 years ago Killed by Liu Shun in Chapter 10
–	Leung Chi Kau 梁志球	A policeman Cheung Tsz Tung's friend and provided financial assistance to him Framed Liu Shun for assaulting policemen and stealing police gun 8 years ago Killed by Liu Shun in Chapter 11
–	Fung Kuen 馮權	A retired policeman, emigrated to Canada; Framed Liu Shun for assaulting policemen and stealing police gun 8 years ago

===== Obsessive compulsive disorder (Chapter 13–17) =====
Cast	Role	Description
Raymond Cho	Lam Wai-shan 林威臣	Chan Man-ling's husband Killed Law Kau in Chapter 15; Killed Cheung Lai-ting in Chapter 16; Kidnapped Mok Man-yee in Chapter 16; Had obsessive compulsive disorder (Villain)
Anita Kwan	Chan Man-ling 陳漫玲	Lam Wai-shan's husband Killed in a traffic accident caused by Law Kau and Cheung Lai-ting
Stephen Wong Ka-lok	Cheng Sum-kit 鄭心傑	A gay Cheng Sum-yau's younger brother Ko Lap-yan and Cheng Sum-yau's patient Melvin and Kwok Yiu's boyfriend Sexually assaulted by Law Kau
To Kong	Melvin	Cheng Sum-kit's boyfriend
Mikako Leung	Kwok Yiu 郭瑤	Cheng Sum-kit's girlfriend
Chan Tik-hak	Law Kau 羅九	A shipyard supervisor Had pedophilia Sexually assaulted Cheng Sum-kit; Killed by Law Wai-shun in Chapter 15
Annie Wong	Cheung Lai-ting 張麗婷	Abandoned her new-born in a shopping mall Killed by Lam Wai-shan in Chapter 16
Kate Tsui	Mok Man-yee 莫敏兒	A police officer Kidnapped by Lam Wai-shan in Chapter 16

===== Dissociative identity disorder (Chapter 17–20) =====
Cast	Role	Description
Henry Lee	Law Kwok-hung 羅國洪	A cleaning service company owner Lau Kit-po's husband Had dissociative identity disorder Abused Lau Kit-po; Injured Ko Sau-yee; Killed Tse Sze-nga and Wu Kam-chuen (Villain)
June Chan	Lau Kit-po 劉潔寶	An elderly centre volunteer Law Kwok-hung's wife Ko Sau-yee's friend Wu Kam-chuen's ex-girlfriend and used to be abused by Wu Kam-chuen; Sheltered Law Kwok-hung; Abused by Law Kwok-hung
Irene Wong	Tse Sze-nga 謝思雅	A nurse Co-Co; Law Wing-hang's mistress Killed by Law Kwok-hung in Episode 17
Au Sui-wai	Wu Kam-chuen 胡錦全	A patient A triad member Lau Kit-po's ex-boyfriend Always harassed Law Kwok-hung and Law Kit-po after jail Killed by Law Kwok-hung in Episode 18
Elliot Yue	Ko Sau-yee 高守義	An elderly centre volunteer Lau Kit-po's friend Knocked down by a car driven by Law Kwok-hung and lost a leg in Episode 19

==== Others ====
Cast	Role	Description
Vivien Yeo	Suen Ka Pik 孫家碧	Singaporean Chinese; Had bulimia nervosa, finally on a diet successfully Suen Chun Yeung's daughter Ho Tak Kwong's ex-girlfriend Lee Ying Chun's girlfriend, later wife
Chung King Fai	Leong Wai Keong 梁偉強	Psychiatrist; A psychiatric clinic owner Ko Lap Yan's lecturer
Yvonne Ho	Tina	A financial manager Lee Ying Chun's ex-girlfriend Peter's girlfriend
Max Cheung	Peter	A financial Asia-Pacific director Tina's boyfriend
Kong Hon	Suen Chun Yeung 孫震揚	Singaporean Chinese billionaire Suen Ka Pik's father
Deno Cheung	Ho Tak Kwong 何德廣	Suen Ka Pik's ex-boyfriend
Angelina Lo	Chiu Yuk Fan 趙玉芬	Gambler; Ko Sau Yee's ex-girlfriend Fung Kam's mother Suicided in Chapter 13
Daniel Kwok	Fung Kam 馮錦	Chiu Yuk Fan's son Stole Chiu Yuk Fan's money to pay for his debt
Wong Tin-chau	Luk Chun Kwong	Alan; Ko Ho Nam's ex-boyfriend
Lau Kong	Mok Kwai San 莫貴生	Tea house owner Mok Man Yee's grandfather

=== Series 2 characters ===
==== Bok On Hospital ====
Cast	Role	Description
Cheung Kwok-keung	Law Wing Hang 羅永鏗	Henry psychiatrist superintendent, charged for obstruction of justice in episode 25.
Alex Fong	Ko Lap Yan 高立仁	A psychiatrist Lois Cheuk's lover. Friends with Lin Chi Sum, Leung Kai wing, and Lam Chung Yan
Ram Chiang	Lin Chi Sum 連志森	Opened a private clinic.
Edwin Siu	Jackson Leung Kai Wing 梁啟榮	A psychiatrist Lai Yu Chu's lover, later husband. Used to have an affair with Scarlett Chan.
Christine Kuo	Scarlett Chan Si Ka 陳思家	Psychiatrist. Jackson Leung's girlfriend, later broke up.
Eric Li	Ken 陸日勤	' Psychiatrist. Lai Yu Chu's ex-boyfriend.
Power Chan	Sunny Ho Lin Yuet 何年月	Psychiatrist. Scarlett Chan's boyfriend, later good friends.
Oscar Leung	Wong Sai Bong 王世邦	Edgar; Psychiatrist; Friends with Ken and Jackson.
	Katie 杜慧敏	A psychiatrist. Ken's girlifriend. Broke up in episode 24.
Li Shing-cheong	Lo Ying Kei 盧應奇	Psychiatrist
Yoyo Mung	Cheuk Wai Kiu 卓慧翹	Lois; Psychiatrist. Ko Lap Yan's friend.

==== Sui Oi Psychiatric Clinic ====
Cast	Role	Description
Ram Chiang	Lin Chi Sum 連志森	Owner of Sui Oi Psychiatric clinic
Aimee Chan	Lai Yiu Chu 賴瑤珠	Psychiatrist at Sui Oi clinic
Leanne Li	Tong Ka Lai 唐嘉麗	Psychiatrist at Sui Oi clinic

==== Major Case Unit ====
Cast	Role	Description
Ben Wong	Chung Kwok Bun 鍾國彬	啊頭 啊彬; Senior inspector. Lam Chung Yan's boyfriend. Run over by car causing massive brain injuries. Woke up from coma in episode 25
Tavia Yeung	Lam Chung Yan 林頌恩	Madam 啊恩; Undercover cop, later HKPF constable. Chung Kwok Bun's girlfriend. Ko Lap Yan's friend. Lin Chi Sum's patient. Kidnapped and stabbed by Cheng Pui Yu in episode 19, causing her to have schizophrenia and dissociative identity disorder. Suicided in episode 25.
Au Sui Wai	Tse Zan Tung 謝振東	老鬼. In charge after Kwok Bun was injured in episode 23.
Chiu Lok Yin	Chiang Wai Man 蔣偉文	Policeman
Fok Kin Bong	Lee Man Kit 李文杰	Policeman
Oscar Chan	Suen Wai Ho 孫偉豪	Policeman

Season 1 viewership ratings.

	Week	Episodes	Average Points	Peaking Points	References
1	10–14 January 2011	1–5	29	31	
2	17–20 January 2011	6–9	31	35	
3	24–28 January 2011	10–14	30	—	
4	31 January – 2 February 2011, 4 February 2011	15–18	27	—	
4	5 February 2011	19–20	23	27	

Season 2 viewership ratings.

	Week	Episodes	Average Points	Peaking Points	References
1	18–22 March 2013	1–5	26	28	
2	25–29 March 2013	6–10	27	31	
3	01–5 April 2013	11–15	28	—	
4	16–20 April 2013	16–20	27	—	
5	15–19 April 2013	21–25	29	—	

== Awards and nominations ==
=== 45th TVB Anniversary Awards 2011 ===
- Nominated: Best Drama
- Nominated: Best Supporting Actor (Ram Chiang)
- Nominated: Best Supporting Actress (Vivien Yeo)

== International Broadcast ==
- Malaysia – 8TV (Malaysia) from II onwards.
