= Steven Ma =

Hong Kong singer and actor (born 1971)

- 馬浚偉
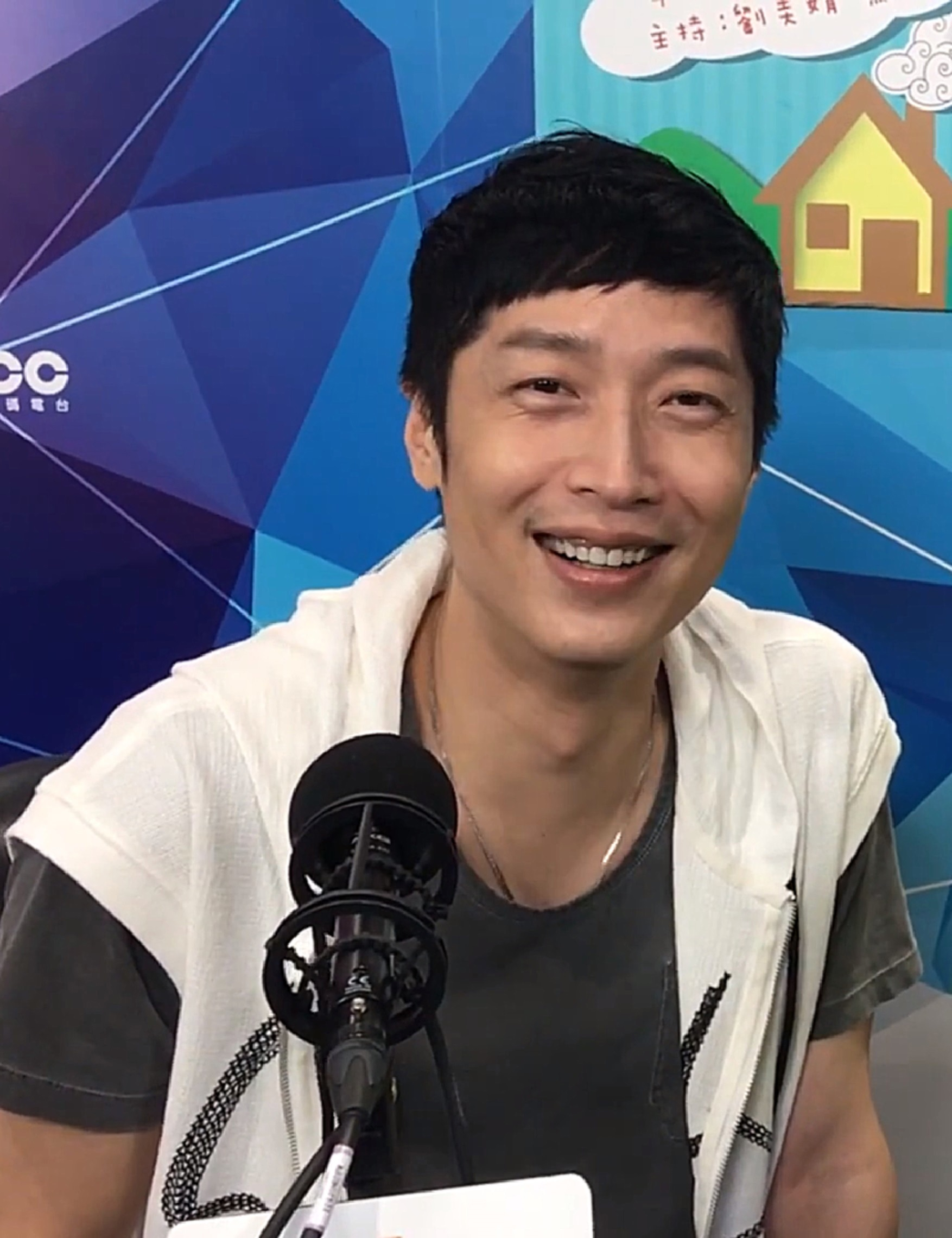
- Ma in 2016
- Born: Vincent Ma Chi-wai 馬志偉 (Note: Jyutping: maa5 zi3 wai5); 26 October 1971 (age 54); Shek Kip Mei, Kowloon, British Hong Kong
- Occupations: Actor; singer
- Years active: 1993–present
- Awards: TVB Anniversary Awards – My Favourite Television Character; 2001 On the Track or Off; 2002 Where the Legend Begins; 2003 Perish in the Name of Love; My Favourite Male Character; 2006 Safe Guards Asian Television Awards – Best Entertainment Present/Host; 2011 Apprentice Chef (Highly Commended)

Chinese name
Transcriptions
Standard Mandarin
- Hanyu Pinyin: Mǎ Jùnwěi
Yue: Cantonese
- Jyutping: Maa5 Zeon3 Wai5

Steven Ma Chun-wai (Chinese: 馬浚偉, born 26 October 1971) is a Hong Kong actor and singer. In 1993, Ma won a record deal after winning first place at an annual singing contest in Hong Kong, later releasing his debut album, Lucky for Meeting You (幸運就是遇到你), that December. Not long after his singing debut, Ma joined TVB and began filming television dramas, later achieving fame through his supporting role in 1995's legal drama File of Justice IV. Many of Ma's television works are critically acclaimed and are popular successes in Hong Kong, Mainland China, and Southeast Asia, he has starred in several popular TV series, most notably Healing Hands (1998), Return of the Cuckoo (2000), Where the Legend Begins (2002), Steps (2007), A Watchdog's Tale (2009–10), Ghost Writer (2010), The Life and Times of a Sentinel (2011), Storm in a Cocoon (2014) and Deep in the Realm of Conscience (2018). Ma currently holds the record for holding the most "Favourite Character" awards with a total of four recognitions. Ma's best known for his portrayals of historical characters in many period television dramas.

== Early life ==
Ma was born on 26 October 1971 at Shep Kip Mei in Kowloon, He was from family of "grassroots" background. He was raised in the Pak Tin Estate in Sham Shui Po and lived with his father, a bus driver, his mother, three older sisters, and one younger sister. He attended the Pak Tin Catholic Primary School and later the CMA Secondary School. Ma was graduate Master of Business Administration at Peking University and same year He start to study basic Chinese Medicine in Hong Kong Baptist University in 2020.

== Music career ==
In 1993, Ma won first place at an annual singing contest in Hong Kong, also winning a record deal. He released his debut album, Lucky for Meet You (幸運就是遇到你), that December. To promote the album, his record label created the slogan "He's not Leon Lai, he's not Jacky Cheung" to describe Ma's singing talent, which caused their fans to criticise and badmouth Ma. However, when Ma's contract terminated, Warners did not want to renew their contract.

In 2013, Ma participated in the music scene and participated in the new song 給媽媽的「倦」 using the name 二牛.

== TV career ==
=== 1993–2003 ===
In 1993, Ma signed a per series contract with TVB and portrayed minor roles in various television dramas. In 1994, Ma was cast as the supporting character Dr. Stephen Chan Cheuk-yiu in the fourth instalment of the popular legal drama File of Justice series. The drama was a popular success, and Ma gained his first footstep into TVB series. His portrayal of the intelligent Hong-hei Emperor in the 1998 remake of the popular wuxia novel The Duke of Mount Deer garnered even more interest from critics and producers alike, and Ma began earning leading roles.

In 1998, Ma filmed the ever-popular TV series, "Healing Hands", but unlike his carefree and sunny disposition Dr. Joe character in the said series, from 1998 until his mother's death, Ma was actually deeply depressed over the rapidly declining health of his mother, a cancer patient of 22 years. His mother's death in July 1999 totally devastated him. For months he isolated himself in his bedroom to deal with the pain of losing his beloved mother. Ma eventually put aside his pain to get on with his life. In 2002 he set up a publishing company, and in the same year he published the first of his book series of: Steven Ma's True Tales of Society with Why Suicide? (2002) followed up Steven Ma's Tales of Society: I Am the Patient's Family (2003).

Ma's portrayal of the historical figure Cho Chik in the drama Where the Legend Begins (2002) was both a popular and critical success. Following Where was the popular but critically mixed Perish in the Name of Love (2003), a 30-part television drama remake of the famous Cantonese opera Di Nü Hua. Gradually, Ma began filming more dramas with historical or period backgrounds, in which Ma subsequently became known for.

=== 2005–2006 ===
Ma made acting in the series Virtues of Harmony II, the modern spin-off of the sitcom, Virtues of Harmony, he collaborated with the winner of the 2004 Miss Chinese International Pageant, Linda Chung.

Ma is also the first actor to win the My Favourite Male Character award at the 2006 TVB Anniversary Awards through his performance in the 2006 low-budget period drama Safe Guards (2006).

=== 2007–2011 ===
In 2007, Ma performed in The Brink of Law and A Change of Destiny. In the same year, Ma starred in Steps which he has been nominated in TVB Anniversary Award for Best Actor (Top 10), nominated in TVB Anniversary Award for My Favourite Male Character (Top 10) and nominated in Astro Drama Awards for Most Unforgettable Kiss (with Bernice Liu).

In 2008, Ma collaborated with Linda Chung in A Journey Called Life which he praise his co-star Linda Chung, for her beauty, good manner, and ripe acting. The two have worked together in a previous collaboration of Virtues of Harmony II. In 2009 and 2010, Ma again collaborated with Linda Chung with two series, A Watchdog's Tale and Ghost Writer. A Watchdog's Tale released in 2009 actually, but the series got the highest audience rating in the first season in 2010 and top five series in audience rating in the whole year. Meanwhile, Ghost Writer released in 2010 with Ma won Astro Drama Awards for My Top 10 Favourite TV Characters and have been nominated in TVB Anniversary Award for Best Actor (Top 5)

In 2010, Ma performed in Links to Temptation with Fala Chen. He and Fala Chen previously work together in Steps, A Journey Called Life and Ghost Writer.

In 2011, Ma filmed in 7 Days in Life where he played Calvin Yik Cho-on (易早安), a professional thief who, along with his girlfriend Christy (played by Sonija Kwok), robs the irresponsible rich and donates a portion of their stolen fortune to charity. Ma considers Calvin to be one of his first breakthrough roles in his acting career. He also expressed many times in interviews that he wants to try out a villain role, explains that Calvin is "a jerk. He's horny, greedy, and even abducts children, but he's actually a very complex character. He has a painful secret that haunts him." Ma further said, "I can now finally challenge a character who is somewhat villainous." Leung (Executive producer(s)) remarked that Calvin is "so evil that he oozes juice" (a Cantonese phrase meaning "pure evil") but Ma argues that Calvin does have a softer side to him and that he's not completely heartless. The role requires Ma to consistently speak Thai, and he carries a dictionary to the film set every day. Later, Ma performed in The Life and Times of a Sentinel. He played Nip Dor-po (聶多寶). Ma says that Dor-po is the most complicated character he has come across. "I have to officially protect the three (Hao-chong, Hong-hei, and Fuk-tsuen), but at the same time, the three are using me to deal with each other [...] but Hao-chong wants me to die, [Fuk-tsuen] wants me to die, and how can I find ways to save myself and Hong-hei?"

=== 2012–2014: Left TVB, work with TVB independently ===
Ma collaborated with Linda Chung in TVB drama comedy series Daddy Good Deeds who he played Lam Fa's (林發) character, friend and boyfriend to Ko Yu-chu (高如珠) (character played by Linda Chung). Ma praised Linda Chung that her professional attitude and acting, Ma also mentioned that she was still maintaining the purity of heart and having progress in her acting continually. He and Linda Chung collaborated five times in TVB, was a terrific couple on screen. Later, Ma left TVB because he do not want to renew his contract and joined Hutchison Telecom in January 2012, which ended his 19 years tenure at TVB. Later in August the same year, he announced that he would return to TVB in April 2013 as a head contract. However he has continued to work with TVB independently, starring in their 2014 TVB series, Storm in a Cocoon with Tavia Yeung, Natalie Tong and Evergreen Mak. Ma also filming a new show named Property Protector.

=== 2018–2022: Comeback ===
Ma made a comeback in the TVB series Deep in the Realm of Conscience collaborated with Nancy Wu which he played role as Li Longji. In June 2018, Ma perform a stage play that represents Xu Zhimo. In July 2018, he will move to Singapore to hold two stage performances. In September 2018, he went to Beijing to start a two-year EMBA study career, and in January 2019 he will play another stage play. And in April 2019, he would also shoot his first movie. Ma completed the Executive MBA program at Peking University Guanghua School of Management in 2020.

In September 2020, Ma began studying a two-year foundation course in Chinese medicine at the School of Chinese Medicine of Hong Kong Baptist University.

Ma served as the principal of TVB Art Training Center in 2021, and became the creative director of Hong Kong Radio in May 2021. From November 2022, he will become a nominated member of the Theatre Development Subcommittee of the Leisure and Cultural Services Department. In 2023, he served as a member of the Film and Media Arts Committee of the Hong Kong Arts Development Council. In December 2023, Ma announced that he would temporarily leave the entertainment industry. On January 9, 2024, he was announced as the Chief Operating Officer of Metro Radio and took up the position on January 10. On June 17, 2025, Metro Broadcast announced that Ma will serve as the Chief Executive Officer and will officially take office on July 15.

== Personal life ==
After his mother died in 1999, he suffered from depression and panic disorder. He got out of clinical depression in 2007, but the panic disorder remains, and he is depending on medication for it.

== Filmography ==
=== Film ===
Year	Film	Role	Notes
1996	Lost and Found		
2000	When a Man Loves a Woman		
2000	To Where He Belongs	Fung	
2001	Doctor No...	Lok	
2005	Snake Curse	Kwan Wai	
2014	Next Station I Love You		
2015	Return of the Cuckoo	Szto Lai-sun	Special guest appearance
2019	Till We Meet Again		also director

=== Television ===
Year	Title	Role	Notes
1993	Mind Your Own Business	Wai	
1994	Twilight Tubes		
1994	Hangzhou and Ninbo Tour Special Program	Himself	Host
1994	Splendid Motherland	Himself	Guest host
1995	File of Justice IV	Dr. Stephen Chan Cheuk-yiu	
1995	When a Man Loves a Woman	Steven Au-yeung Kam	
1995	America's Disneyland Tour	Himself	Host
1995	England Tour	Himself	Host
1996	Behind the Beauty	Fung	Television film
1997	File of Justice V	Dr. Stephen Chan Cheuk-yiu	
1997	Metro of Appeal	himself	Guest host
1998	The Duke of Mount Deer	Hong-hei Emperor	
1998	Healing Hands	Dr. Joe Cheung Ka-yu	
1998	ICAC Investigators 1998	Chiu Man-tak	Episode: "Special Passage"
1998	ICAC on Not-for-Sale Items	Himself	Host
1999	Ultra Protection	Kei Yin-jo	
2000	Return of the Cuckoo	Szeto Lai-shun	
2000	Healing Hands II	Dr. Joe Cheung Kar-yu	
2001	On the Track or Off	Kam Yuen	TVB Anniversary Award for My Top 13 Favourite Television Characters
2001	In the Realm of Success	Chu Ho-yin	
2002	Where the Legend Begins	Cho Chi-kin (Cho Chik)	TVB Anniversary Award for My Top 12 Favourite Television Characters; Nominated – TVB Anniversary Award for Best Actor (Top 5)
2003	Perish in the Name of Love	Chow Sai-hin	TVB Anniversary Award for My Top 12 Favourite Television Characters
2003	Better Halves	Chuen Ka-fuk	
2004	Cul-de-sac	Sung Ka-fai	Television film
2004	Dark Shadow	Au Ho-man / Choi Wing-kei / Lee Sai-kit	Television film
2005	Virtues of Harmony II	Ivan Sze Chi-shan	Pairs up with Linda Chung; Sitcom regular Episodes 343–443
2006	Safe Guards	Sheung Chi	Pairs up with Elaine Yiu; TVB Anniversary Award for My Favourite Male Character; Nominated – TVB Anniversary Award for Best Actor (Top 20); Nominated – TVB Anniversary Award for Most Improved Male Artiste
2006	Land of Wealth	Cheung Shung-man	Hong Kong of the Decade: Wangyu Award for Best Dramatic Actor
2006	Zhaojun Chu Sai	Wang Mang	aka Wang Zhaojun Goes Beyond the Borders
2007	The Brink of Law	Tong Chi-ko	
2007	A Change of Destiny	Yuen Hei	
2007	Steps	Ching Ka-jun	Pairs up with Bernice Liu; Nominated – TVB Anniversary Award for Best Actor (Top 10); Nominated – TVB Anniversary Award for My Favourite Male Character (Top 10); Nominated – Astro Drama Awards for Most Unforgettable Kiss (with Bernice Liu)
2008	The Gentle Crackdown II	Tse Wong-sheung (謝皇上)	Pairs up with Yumiko Cheng; StarHub TVB Awards for My Favourite Male TVB Character
2008	A Journey Called Life	Shing Yat-on (成日安)	Pairs up with Linda Chung
2009	That Was Then	Himself	Voice-over; 13 episodes Nominated – TVB Anniversary Award for Best Variety Show (Top 5); Nominated – TVB Anniversary Award for Most Enjoyable Programme (Top 5)
2009	Sweetness in the Salt	Nip Chi-yuen (聶致遠)	Pairs up with Tavia Yeung; Nominated – TVB Anniversary Award for Best Actor (Top 5); Nominated – TVB Anniversary Award for My Favourite Male Character (Top 10)
2009–10	A Watchdog's Tale	Chow Yung-kung (周用恭)	Pairs up with Linda Chung; Nominated – TVB Anniversary Award for My Favourite Male Character (Top 5)
2010	Apprentice Chef	Himself	Host; 18 episodes Nominated – TVB Anniversary Award for Best Host (Top 5)
2010	Cupid Stupid	Chi Yat-po (池一寶)	Warehoused; released on DVD
2010	Ghost Writer	Po Chung-ling (蒲松齡)	Pairs up with Fala Chen and Linda Chung; Astro Drama Awards for My Top 10 Favourite TV Characters; Nominated – TVB Anniversary Award for Best Actor (Top 5)
2010–11	Links to Temptation	Wilson Shing Wai-shun (成偉信)	Pairs up with Fala Chen
2011	7 Days in Life	Calvin Yik Cho-on (易早安)	Pairs up with Sonija Kwok
2011	Book of Words 2	Himself	Host; 28 episodes
2011	Apprentice Chef 2	Himself	Host; Nominated – TVB Anniversary Award for Best Host
2011	The Life and Times of a Sentinel	Nip Dor-po/Kei Chun-kit/Prince Wing (聶多寶)	Nominated – TVB Anniversary Award for Best Actor (Top 15); Nominated – TVB Anniversary Award for My Favourite Male Character (Top 15)
2012	Daddy Good Deeds	Lam Fat (林發)	Pairs up with Linda Chung; Supporting Role 男配角
2012	Legend of Yuan Empire Founder	Liu Bingzhong (劉秉忠)	
2012	Yuen Yang Pei	Li Lai Fu / Tang Ting Xuan	
2014	Storm in a Cocoon	Poon Ka Yeung (潘家揚)	Pairs up with Tavia Yeung; 1/2 of the Male Lead 两大男主角之一
2018	Heart and Greed	Lee Ming Kei (李明基)	Guest appearance
2018	Deep in the Realm of Conscience	Li Longji (李隆基)	Pairs up with Nancy Wu; One of the three Male Leads 三大男主角之一

== Discography ==
- 1993: Lucky for Meeting You (幸運就是遇到你)
- 1994: Heading Towards You Now (這刻向你衝)
- 1995: Deep Passion – New Songs + Special Selection (濃情—新曲+精選)
- 1996: I Was Also Drunk Before (我也曾醉過) – Mandarin Chinese record
- 1997: Honey (蜜糖)
- 1998: Daynight
- 1999: Lifestyle
- 2000: Lifestyle II
- 2001: Give Me 3'07" (給我3'07")
- 2001: My Most Missed – New Songs + Special Selection (我最關心—新歌+精選)
- 2002: Warner Best MV of 25 Years Karaoke VCD – Various Artist I (華納精采視聽25載卡拉OK VCD叱吒傳奇 – 叱吒群星I)
  - 05. "Long Nights, Many Dreams" (夜長夢多)
- 2002: Warner Best MV of 25 Years Karaoke VCD – Various Artist II (華納精采視聽25載卡拉OK VCD叱吒傳奇 – 叱吒群星II)
  - 11. "Don't Be Sad" (不再悲觀)
- 2002: Warner Best MV of 25 Years Karaoke VCD – Various Artist III (華納精采視聽25載卡拉OK VCD叱吒傳奇 – 叱吒群星III)
  - "Lucky for Meeting You" (幸運就是遇到你)
- 2002: Greatest Hits Steven – New Songs + Special Selection
- 2002: Don't Shut In & Self-Abuse (切勿自閉、糟蹋自己)
- 2003: New Princess Cheung-ping (新帝女花)
- 2003: My Theme Song (我的主題曲)
- 2006: EEG TVB Kids Song Selection (EEG TVB 兒歌大放送)
  - 11. "After School ICU" (After School ICU Theme)
- 2008: Love TV (Love TV 情歌精選)
  - 04. "Little Story" (A Journey Called Life Theme)
- 2009: Love TV 2 (Love TV 情歌精選 2)
  - 14. "How to Say Love" (Sweetness in the Salt Theme)

== Collaborate ==
Steven Ma had collaborated with actress where there is a terrific couple on screen.

Actress	Times	Drama
Linda Chung	5	Virtues of Harmony II (2005), A Journey Called Life (2008), A Watchdog's Tale (2009–10), Ghost Writer (2010), Daddy Good Deeds (2012)
Tavia Yeung	2	Sweetness in the Salt (2009), Storm in a Cocoon (2014)
Sonija Kwok	2	Land of Wealth (2006), 7 Days in Life (2011)
Bernice Liu	2	The Brink of Law (2007). Steps (2007)
Charmaine Sheh	2	Return of the Cuckoo (2000), Perish in the Name of Love (2003)
Fala Chen	2	Ghost Writer (2010), Links to Temptation (2010-2011)
Ada Choi	2	On the Track or Off (2001), Where the Legend Begins (2002)
Nancy Wu	1	Deep in the Realm of Conscience (2018)
Selena Li	1	The Life and Times of a Sentinel (2011)
Yumiko Cheng	1	The Gentle Crackdown II (2008)
Shirley Yeung	1	A Change of Destiny (2007)
Elaine Yiu	1	Safe Guards (2006)

== Other works ==
Other works
Year	Work	Role	Notes
1998	Francis Yip and The Phil '98: Simply the Best Concert	Himself	Live concert; guest star
2000	Fai Wong True Friendship 2000 Concert	Himself	Live concert; guest star
2007	Hamlet	Prince Hamlet	Stage play
2008	Joyce Koi and HKCO III Concert	Himself	Live concert; guest star

== Television songs ==
Year	Title	TV series	Type	Album	Other notes
1995	"Hoping to Love You Forever" (願望用一生愛你)	File of Justice IV	Sub-theme	Honey	
1997	"Not Suppose to Happen" (不應該發生)	File of Justice V	Sub-theme	Honey	
1998	"The Skies Above" (頭頂一片天)	The Duke of Mount Deer	Ending theme	Daynight	
1998	"Once" (曾經幾許)	Healing Hands	Sub-theme	Daynight	
1998	"Miss You Finally"	Healing Hands	Sub-theme	Daynight	
1999	"Good Morning, Good Night" (早安晚安)	Ultra Protection	Theme	Lifestyle	
2001	"Wanting to Fly" (想飛)	On the Track of Off	Theme	Give Me 3'07"	
2001	"Let Me Go First" (讓我先走)	On the Track of Off	Sub-theme	Give Me 3'07"	
2001	"Caring You" (重視你)	In the Realm of Success	Theme	My Most Missed	
2001	"My Most Missed" (我最關心)	In the Realm of Success	Theme	My Most Missed	
2002	"Angel in the Water (水中仙)	Where the Legend Begins	Theme	Greatest Hits Steven	
2002	"Flowing Sand (流沙)	Where the Legend Begins	Ending theme	Greatest Hits Steven	with Rain Lee
2003	"Daughter's Fragrant Soul" (帝女芳魂)	Perish in the Name of Love	Theme	New Princess Cheung-ping	with Charmaine Sheh
2003	"Confess" (錯認)	Perish in the Name of Love	Ending theme	New Princess Cheung-ping	
2003	"Soldiers and Chariots (兵車還)	Perish in the Name of Love	Sub-theme	New Princess Cheung-ping	
2003	"Good Men of the Lands" (萬民萬家都好漢)	Perish in the Name of Love	Sub-theme	New Princess Cheung-ping	
2003	"Beautiful Fate" (美麗緣份)	Better Halves	Theme	My Theme Song	
2003	"Loving String" (情牽一線)	Better Halves	Sub-theme	My Theme Song	with Maggie Cheung Ho-yee
2006	"Home of Friends" (會友之鄉)	Safe Guards	Theme	Singing Every Year (唱旺年年)	
2007	"Breakthrough" (突圍)	At the Brink of Law	Theme	Singing Every Year	with Ron Ng
2007	"Counting Destiny" (天數)	A Change of Destiny	Theme		with Joel Chan
2008	"Wolf and Goat" (豺狼與羊)	The Gentle Crackdown II	Theme	Super Model (超模)	with Yumiko Cheng
2008	"Little Story" (小故事)	A Journey Called Life	Theme	Love TV	with Linda Chung
2009	"How to Say Love" (愛怎麼說)	Sweetness in the Salt	Theme	Love TV 2	with Tavia Yeung
2009	"A Watchdog's Tale" (老友狗狗)	A Watchdog's Tale	Theme		with Linda Chung
2010	"Heard" (聽說)	Cupid Stupid	Theme		
2010	"Clear Thought" (心竅)	Ghost Writer	Theme		
2011	"Changing Sky" (變天)	The Life and Times of a Sentinel	Theme		
2014	"Heaven's Fate" (天意)	Storm in a Cocoon	Theme		
2018	Moon and Sea (明月與海)	Deep in the Realm of Conscience	Sub Theme		with Nancy Wu

== Awards and nominations ==
=== 2018 ===
- 2018: (TVB Anniversary Gala) My Favourite TVB Drama Character (Singapore) Nomination (Deep in the Realm of Conscience)
- 2018: (TVB Anniversary Gala) My Favourite TVB Drama Character (Malaysia) Nomination(Deep in the Realm of Conscience)

== Publications ==
- September 2002: Steven Ma's Veritable Records of Society I: Why Commit Suicide? (馬浚偉社會實錄I-點解要自殺?)
- May 2003: Steven Ma's Veritable Records of Society II: I Am the Patient's Family (馬浚偉社會實錄II-我是病人家屬)
- May 2004: Steven ma's Veritable Records of Society III: To Good Direction, To Bad Direction (馬浚偉社會實錄III-向好走 向壞走)
- July 2003: The Women In Ma Jai's Eyes (馬仔眼中的女人)
- July 2008: Correct Designs (圖文並謬)
- July 2011: Steven Ma comfortable Eating Attitudes (馬浚偉自在飲食態度)

Awards and achievements
TVB Anniversary Awards
Preceded by N/A	My Favorite Male Character; 2006 for Safe Guards	Succeeded by Moses Chan for Heart of Greed
