= Life After Death (TV series) =

- Also known as: 那些我愛過的人
- Genre: Melodrama
- Written by: Pang Mei-fung
- Directed by: Keung Chun-kit; Ho Man-yi; Lee Ho-kei; Ng Tsz-lung; Tsang Man-shan
- Starring: Frankie Lam; Priscilla Wong; Mark Ma; Shiga Lin; Yoyo Chen
- Country of origin: Hong Kong
- Original language: Cantonese
- No. of episodes: 25

Production
- Producers: Kwan Shu-ming; Kwan Man-shum
- Production location: Hong Kong
- Running time: 43 minutes
- Production company: TVB

Original release
- Network: TVB Jade
- Release: June 8 – July 10, 2020

Life After Death (Chinese: 那些我愛過的人; lit. 'The People I Have Loved') is a 2020 Hong Kong romantic melodrama television series starring Frankie Lam, Priscilla Wong, Mark Ma and Shiga Lin. Produced by Kwan Shu-ming and Kwan Man-shum, the series premiered on TVB on June 8, 2020.

== Synopsis ==
A deadly car accident leaves both Keung Yuk-sing (Frankie Lam) and Laura Fong Lok-man (Priscilla Wong) widowed. Seven years later, another accident has Yuk-sing encounter Laura. Laura rekindles her bond with her estranged sister Sherman Fong Shu-man (Shiga Lin) with the help of Dr. Koo Hei-sun (Mark Ma), who has Asperger syndrome. Laura grieves the passing of her mother-in-law and is trying to taking care of her daughter Chu Hang-yee and stepson Chu Ka-bing, while Yuk-sing struggles to understand the needs of his teenage daughter Keung Chi-yau. As Ka-bing and Chi-yau get closer, their mutual friend Eden Mok Yu-him creates more problems for their relationship, and the truth of the car accident gradually surfaces, forcing everyone to face changes again.

== Cast and characters ==
- Frankie Lam as Keung Yuk-sing, a boxing instructor
- Priscilla Wong as Laura Fong Lok-man, an insurance agent
- Mark Ma as Koo Hei-sun, a family doctor with Asperger syndrome; a colleague of Sherman.
- Shiga Lin as Sherman Fong Shu-man, Laura’s younger sister, an obstetrician and gynecologist
- Yoyo Chen as Sabrina Chin Li-woon, a manager at Laura's insurance company, Laura and Sherman’s close friend
- Stephen Wong as Kung Ka-ho, a trading company CEO
- Kyle Li as Eden Mok Yu-him, a student at Yuk-sing's boxing club
- Chloe So as Yoyo Keung Tsz-yau, Yuk-sing's teenage daughter
- Zeno Koo as Ben Chu Ka-bing, a high school student and Laura's stepson
- Rainbow Ching as Au Lai-hing, Hei-sun’s mother
- Grace Wong Chi-ching as Chu Hang-yee, Laura's daughter
- Erin Wong as Kung Chin-chin
- Griselda Yeung (special guest star) as Mavis, deceased wife of Yuk-sing
- William Chak (special guest star) as Chu Hon-fai, deceased husband of Laura
- Mary Hon as Mavis' mother
- James Ng as himself (guest appearance)
- Andrew Yuen as a dog trainer (guest appearance)

== Production and themes ==
The series was produced by Kwan Shu-ming and Kwan Man-shum and script supervised by Pang Mei-fung, with direction handled by a rotating team.

The theme, revolving around family relationships, highlights conflicts caused by miscommunication. It uses the event of a car accident to symbolize the hardships encountered in life and how one overcomes them.

== Reception ==
The television series placed fifth in 2020 Yahoo Hong Kong "Top Ten Most Searched Television Dramas" Popularity list. It was also named by Hong Kong Economic Times as one of the most popular television series of the year.

Week	Episodes	Airing dates	Average ratings (Note: According to Hong Kong's TV rating system, each rating point represents approximately 64,670 viewers.)	Peak ratings	Ref.
1	1－5	June 8－12, 2020	25.9 points	27.8 points	
2	6－10	June 15–19, 2020	27.5 points	29.6 points	
3	11－15	June 22–26, 2020	26.8 points	28.3 points	
4	16－20	June 29 – July 3, 2020	28.0 points	28.6 points	
5	21－25	July 6–10, 2020	28.9 points	31.9 points	
Average Total:			27.4 points	31.9 points	

== Music ==
The soundtrack for Life After Death consists of 4 individually released singles as follows:

Life After Death

Soundtrack album by Various Artists
- Released: June 8, 2020 & June 15, 2020
- Genre: Cantopop
- Language: Cantonese
- Label: The Voice Entertainment Group
- Producers: Herman To & Joseph Wei

Track Listing
No.	Title	Lyrics	Music	Artist(s)	Length
1.	"Little Lies (小謊言)"	Cheung Mei-yin	Cheung Ka-sing	Shiga Lin	3:51
2.	"I Don't Wanna Lose (我輸不起)"	Cheung Mei-yin	Cheung Ka-sing	Hana Kuk	3:31
3.	"I Don't Miss You At All (沒有你並無掛念)"	Yeung Hei	Tsui Lok-cheung & Johnny Yim	Jinny Ng	4:31
4.	"Flying Dreams (夢飛翔)"	Cheung Mei-yin	Cheung Ka-sing	Brian Tse & Joey Thye	3:57

== Awards and nominations ==
Award	Category	Recipient(s)	Result	Ref.
TVB Anniversary Awards	Drama of the Year	Life After Death	Nominated	
TVB Anniversary Awards	Best Actor	Mark Ma	Nominated	
TVB Anniversary Awards	Best Actress	Priscilla Wong	Nominated	
TVB Anniversary Awards	Best Actress	Shiga Lin	Nominated	
TVB Anniversary Awards	Best Supporting Actor	Stephen Wong	Nominated	
TVB Anniversary Awards	Best Supporting Actress	Yoyo Chen	Nominated	
TVB Anniversary Awards	Most Popular TV Male Character	Mark Ma	Nominated	
TVB Anniversary Awards	Most Popular TV Female Character	Priscilla Wong	Nominated	
TVB Anniversary Awards	Most Popular TV Female Character	Shiga Lin	Nominated	
TVB Anniversary Awards	Most Popular TV Female Character	Yoyo Chen	Nominated	
TVB Anniversary Awards	Most Popular On-screen Partnership	Priscilla Wong, Shiga Lin and Yoyo Chen	Nominated	
TVB Anniversary Awards	Most Popular Themesong	"Little Lies"	Nominated	
TVB Anniversary Awards	Most Popular Themesong	"I Don't Wanna Lose"	Nominated	
TVB Anniversary Awards	Most Popular Themesong	"I Don't Miss You At All"	Nominated	
TVB Anniversary Awards	Most Popular Themesong	"Flying Dreams"	Nominated	
TVB Star Awards Malaysia	Favorite Drama of the Year	Life After Death	Nominated	
TVB Star Awards Malaysia	Favorite Actor	Mark Ma	Nominated	
TVB Star Awards Malaysia	Favorite Actress	Priscilla Wong	Nominated	
TVB Star Awards Malaysia	Favorite Actress	Shiga Lin	Nominated	
