= On the Track or Off =

Hong Kong television series

- 勇往直前
- Genre: Modern Drama
- Starring: Steven Ma; Ada Choi; Bondy Chiu; Frankie Lam; Bill Chan
- Opening theme: "想飛" by Steven Ma
- Ending theme: "讓我先走" by Steven Ma
- Country of origin: Hong Kong
- Original language: Cantonese
- No. of episodes: 40

Production
- Producer: Amy Wong
- Running time: 45 minutes (approx.)

Original release
- Network: TVB
- Release: April 9 – June 1, 2001

On the Track or Off (Chinese: 勇往直前) a.k.a. The Track is a TVB series released in 2001. Its storyline revolves around the horse racing business and stars Bondy Chui, Steven Ma, Frankie Lam and Ada Choi.
