= A Journey Called Life =

- Official poster
- 金石良缘
- Genre: Modern Drama
- Starring: Linda Chung; Steven Ma; Kent Cheng; Raymond Cho; Fala Chen; Queenie Chu
- Opening theme: "小故事" by Linda Chung & Steven Ma
- Country of origin: Hong Kong
- Original language: Cantonese
- No. of episodes: 20

Production
- Running time: 45 minutes (approx.)

Original release
- Network: TVB
- Release: March 31 – April 25, 2008

A Journey Called Life (Traditional Chinese: 金石良缘) is a TVB modern drama series broadcast in March 2008, starring Linda Chung, Steven Ma and Kent Cheng.

This is also one of the few TVB series that TVB has produced that dealt with real life issues and scenarios. It's a series that involved both morals and life's lessons. The entire series featured problems that teenagers and young adults have been dealing with over past decade, including drugs, abortions, rape, family trust and relationships, money and greed.

== Synopsis ==
Never torn apart in sorrow
Never give up in hope

Ever since her mother died when she was young, Sze Ka-Ka (Linda Chung) became rebellious and lived a life of drugs, alcohol and general lawlessness. Due to her step-family's disdain for her and misunderstandings surrounding her mother's death, Ka and her family do not get along. When a random incident reveals that her mother's remains have gone missing, Ka desperately searches for them. Eventually, she is able to find the remains in Kam Shek's (Kent Cheng) stone factory. Ka's love for her mother impresses Shek and his disciple Shing Yat-On (Steven Ma). On befriends Ka and helps her solve many of her problems, even finding her a job in his sister, Shing Mei-Sum's (Fala Chen) company. Ka appreciates all the things On has done for her and slowly, her lifestyle changes for the better. They grow to adore one another, but do not confess their love for each other because they were both afraid of being heartbroken and would rather keep their brother-sister-like relationship. Eventually an opportunity occurs when Shek is staying in the hospital for heart surgery. Shek has Ka become On's trainer for the marathon in his place. When On wins third place in the race and celebrates with his old running partner, Ka becomes jealous, but it is through this that they reveal their feelings for each another.

Sum is a money-oriented woman who wants to marry rich. She dates her boss Tung Ka-Cheung (Cheng Tse-Sing) while having an affair with Shek's son Kam Wing-Loi (Raymond Cho). When she gets pregnant accidentally, she has an abortion because she does not want the baby to ruin her chances of marrying rich. The family is bitterly disappointed in Sum. As her relationship with her family worsens, Cheung also reveals that he is aware of Sum's affair with Loi and violently breaks up with her. Rejected by her family and now without someone to depend on, Sum is downcast and drinks to relieve her stress. When the family is leaving after eating at a restaurant, Ka is hit by Sum's drunk driving and loses her unborn child. On, especially, is very upset and become incredibly cold towards Sum. In guilt, Sum drinks and becomes an alcoholic and eventually dies from alcohol poisoning at the moment on the beach when On arrived attempting to help her. On becomes depressed and loses his optimism for life. However, with the help of Ka and his vision of their daughter, On again finds hope and is able to finish the marathon that he has prepared so long for. Together, Ka becomes pregnant once again and Kam moves back home.

== Cast ==
Sze family

Cast	Role	Description
Kwok Fung (郭峰)	Sze Lap-Ji 施立志	Sze Ka-Ka's father.
Chuk Man-kwan	Wong Oi-lam 王愛琳	Sze ka-ka's mother
Linda Chung	Sze Ka-Ka 施嘉嘉	Sze Lap-Ji's daughter Maggie's friend

Shing family

Cast	Role	Description
Mary Hon (韓馬利)	Ho Bo-Ling 何寶玲	55 years old Shing Yat-On, Shing Mei-Sum and Shing Mei-Yee's mother.
Steven Ma	Shing Yat-On 成日安	33 years old Stone Carver; Kam Shek's student. Sze Ka-Ka's husband. Shing Mei-Sum and Shing Mei-Yee's older brother.
Linda Chung	Sze Ka-Ka 施嘉嘉	23 years old Shing Yat-on's wife
Fala Chen	Shing Mei-Sum (Vicky) 成美心	25 years old Shing Yat-On's younger sister. Shing Mei-Yee's eldest sister. Kam Wing-Loi's lover. Died in episode 20
Helena Wong (黃卓慧)	Shing Mei-Yee (Moon) 成美意	Shing Yat-On and Shing Mei-Sum's youngest sister.

Kam family

Cast	Role	Description
Kent Cheng	Kam Shek 金石	60 years old Stone Carver Boss; Shung Yat-On's mentor. Kam Wing-Loi's father.
Angelina Lo (盧宛茵)	Chin Sau-Ching 錢秀清	55 years old Kam Shek's wife. Kam Wing-Loi's mother.
Raymond Cho	Kam Wing-Loi 金永來 (Roy)	33 years old Kam Shek's son. Shing Mei-Sum's lover.

Cheung family

Cast	Role	Description
Helen Ma (馬海倫)	Yeung Dai-Fun 楊大芬	Sze Lap-Ji's wife. Sze Ka-Ka's stepmother.
Eric Li (李天翔)	Cheung Jan-Wing 張振榮	Sze Ka-Ka's stepbrother. Yeung Dai-Fun's eldest son.
Hoffman Cheng	Cheung Jan-keung 張振強	
Stephen Wong	Cheung Jan-Hing 張振興	Shing Mei-Yee's husband. Yeung Dai-Fun's third son.
Helena Wong	Shing Mei-Yee 成美意	Cheung Jan-Hing's wife.
Meini Cheung	Cheung Lai-kun 張麗娟	

Other cast

Cast	Role	Description
Queenie Chu	Keung Ma Kei (Maggie) 姜瑪琪	Sze Ka-Ka's friend/co-worker. Molested by Cheung Jan Wing.
Elaine Yiu	Ching Hoi-San 程凱珊	24 years old Sze Ka-Ka's friend. Died in episode 9
Claire Yiu	何湘媚	Sze Ka-Ka's doctor.

== Viewership ratings ==
	Week	Episode	Average Points	Peaking Points	References
1	March 31 - April 4, 2008	1 — 5	30	32	
2	April 7–11, 2008	6 — 10	31	33	
3	April 14–18, 2008	11 — 15	32	34	
4	April 21–25, 2008	16 — 20	33	37	

== Awards and nominations ==
41st TVB Anniversary Awards (2008)

- "Best Drama"
- "Best Actress in a Leading Role" (Linda Chung - Sze Ka-Ka)
