= Storm in a Cocoon =

Hong Kong TV series

- Promo poster
- 守業者
- Genre: Period drama, Mystery,
- Created by: Hong Kong Television Broadcasts Limited
- Written by: Ng Siu tung 吳肇銅; Tan Chui Shan 譚翠珊; Chan Chee Keung 陳志強; Kui Ka Hui 區嘉慧; Kwan Hong Bing 關洪炳; Leung Man Chi 梁漫之; Man Yu Hang 萬宇衡; Ong Shin Ying 翁善瑩; Teng Si Ting 鄧斯婷
- Directed by: Chum Sui Ming 譚穗铭; Ng Siu Wing 伍兆榮; Wong Wai Yik 黃偉業; Chan Siu Ling 陳筱玲; Shi Chun Kit 施俊傑
- Starring: Steven Ma; Tavia Yeung; Evergreen Mak; Maggie Siu; Natalie Tong; Raymond Cho; Matt Yeung
- Opening theme: Fate 天意 by Steven Ma
- Country of origin: Hong Kong
- Original language: Cantonese
- No. of episodes: 32

Production
- Producer: Leung Choi Yuen
- Production locations: Hong Kong, China
- Editor: Ng Siu Tung 吳肇銅
- Camera setup: Multi camera
- Running time: 44 mins
- Production company: TVB

Original release
- Network: Jade; HD Jade
- Release: 17 February – 28 March 2014

Related
- Outbound Love; Swipe Tap Love

Storm in a Cocoon
- Traditional Chinese: 守業者
- Simplified Chinese: 守业者
- Literal meaning: "Property Protector"
Transcriptions
Standard Mandarin
- Hanyu Pinyin: Shou ye zhe
Yue: Cantonese
- Yale Romanization: Sau2 jip6 ze2
- Jyutping: Sau2 jip6 ze2

Storm in a Cocoon (Chinese: 守業者; literally "Property Protector"), is a Hong Kong pre-modern serial produced by TVB, starring Steven Ma and Tavia Yeung as the main leads. Filming for this series took place in Shunde and Hong Kong.

== Synopsis ==
The boss of Shunde's largest silk factory "Wing Tai Lung", Poon Wing Lin (Elliot Ngok), has decided to pass down the business to his eldest son, Poon Ka Hin (Evergreen Mak) and second daughter, Poon Hau Yee (Akina Hong) due to his old age. However, Hau Yee unexpectedly commits suicide. When third son Poon Ka Yeung (Steven Ma), a military doctor, returns to help run the business, he begins investigating Hau Yee's death as he suspects her death was not a suicide. As Hau Yee's best friend, silk factory worker Tong Bing Bing (Tavia Yeung) also shares Ka Yeung's suspicions and joins him to find the true cause of Hau Yee's death. As their search goes on, they unfold a number of complex relationships between the Poon family and its factory workers, particularly Sin Bik Suet (Maggie Siu), the senior worker in the factory who contends with Bing Bing's behavior, and Fung Chi Chung (Natalie Tong), a duplicitous young woman who enters the factory with secrets of her own to hide.

As Ka Yeung and Bing Bing spend more time together, they gradually develop feelings for one another. However, their relationship is complicated by the reappearance of Bing Bing's long-long fiancé, Kwan Jo Yiu (Raymond Cho), who brings more trouble than everyone anticipates. As they come closer to finding Hau Yee's murderer, the Poon family faces retribution and Ka Yeung and Bing Bing struggle to protect the Poon family's property, not realizing the murderer is much closer to them than they expected.

Though Hau Yee's murderer is apprehended, "Wing Tai Lung" later faces a new danger with the arrival of Chiang Chi Yan (Cheung Kwok Keung), who intends to manipulate and destroy the Poon family by first convincing Ka Hin that he is actually Chi Yan's son and not Wing Lin's son. Believing that Wing Lin's constant criticism of Ka Hin's ability to run the business stems from Chi Yan's claims, Ka Hin willingly takes part in the plan to destroy the Poon family. Ka Yeung and Bing Bing risk everything in order to stop Chi Yan, Wing Cheung and Ka Hin before it's too late.

== Cast ==
=== Main cast ===
- Steven Ma as Poon Ka Yeung (潘家揚)
- Tavia Yeung as Tong Bing Bing (唐冰冰) (Chiang Chi Yan's long-lost daughter)
- Natalie Tong as Fung Chi Ching (馮芷晴)
- Evergreen Mak as Poon Ka Hin (潘家顯) (Villain from Episode 23 onwards, he was indeed manipulated by Chiang Chi Yan and falls out with Poon Ka Yeung, but reconcile from Episode 30)
- Maggie Siu as Sin Bik Wan (冼碧雲)
- Raymond Cho as Kwan Cho Yiu (關祖耀) (Villain)
- Mat Yeung as Hung Chor Gau (洪初九)
- Katy Kung as Kwan Lai Kuen(關麗娟) (Semi-Villain)
- Elliot Ngok as Poon Wing Lin (潘永年)

=== Other cast ===
- Cilla Kung as Sin Yin Foon (冼燕歡)
- Tracy Ip as Yeung Yin To (楊豔桃)
- Rainbow Ching as Chan Yuen Kam (陳婉琴)
- Akina Hong as Poon Hau Yee (潘巧兒)
- Yeung Chiu Hoi as Poon Ka Seng (潘家聲)
- Joseph Lee Kwok Lun as Poon Wing Cheung (潘永祥) (Villain, who collaborates with Chiang Chi Yan)
- Rachel Kan as Wong Mei Fan (王美芬) (Villain)
- Lau Kong as Chow Tin Chi (周天赐)
- Cheung Kwok Keung as Chiang Chi Yan (蔣志仁) (Main Villain, who collaborates with Poon Wing Cheung and manipulates Poon Ka Hin)
- Meini Cheung
- Stephen Wong as Pang Kwok Leung (彭國良) (Main Villain)
- Yue Chi Ming as Tong Wing (唐榮)
- Willie Wai as Tong Chin Gan (唐千斤)
- Albert Law Ho Kai
- Lam King Kong as Sin Dai Ching (冼大成)
- Samantha Chuk Man Kwan as Chu Oi Giu (朱愛嬌)
- Helen Ma as Poon Siu Kwun (潘笑群)
- Hebe Chan
- So Lai Ming
- Kedar Wong
- Eddie Li
- Lily Li
- Lee Yee Man
- Summer Joe Ha Chuk Yan
- Kitty Lau Gwai Fong
- Leo Lee
- Brian Chu
- Jayden Kau Cheuk Nang
- Chan Min Leung
- Wong Wai Tuk
- Chiu Sek Man

== Viewership ratings ==
Week	Episodes	Date	Average Points	Peaking Points
1	01－05	February 17–21, 2014	26	28
2	06－10	February 24–28, 2014	26	32
3	11－15	March 3–7, 2014	27	30
4	16－20	March 10–14, 2014	28	32
5	21-25	March 17–21, 2014	27	31
6	26-30	March 24–28, 2014	29	31
6	31-32	March 30, 2014	32	35
