= Sunshine Heartbeat =

- Promo poster
- 赤沙印記@四葉草2
- Genre: Modern Drama
- Starring: Charles Szeto; Vin Choi; Vivien Yeo; Charmaine Li; Yoyo Chen; Joe Ma; Cathy Chui; Kelly Fu
- Opening theme: "Find Your Love" by Fiona Fung, Roxane Lo, & Peggy Lee
- Country of origin: Hong Kong
- Original language: Cantonese
- No. of episodes: 13

Production
- Running time: 20 minutes (approx.)

Original release
- Network: TVB
- Release: October 3 – December 26, 2004

Sunshine Heartbeat (Chinese title: 赤沙印記@四葉草.2) is a 2004 Hong Kong television series. The story centers on volleyball and high school.

== Synopsis ==
This series is based on high school life, love, and one sport - volleyball. When Mia (Vivien Yeo) was young, she and her sisters, Ah Kiu (Charmaine Li), and Yan Yan (Yoyo Chen) met a fortune teller. Mia was given a bag and told to open it when she turns 18 and it would guide her to her true love. The fortune teller told her to choose carefully so she wouldn't hurt her family. Mia and her sisters buried the bag in a box and promised not to open it until Mia turned 18. Mia stayed with her aunt in New York City while the Ah Kiu and Yan Yan went back to Hong Kong.

10 years later... Mia goes back to Hong Kong and on her 18th birthday, the sisters dig up the time capsule and read the notes. The letter inside the bag reads that Mia's true love would have a four leaf-clover birthmark on him. Mia was happy when she discovers that Ah Sun (Charles Szeto), the most popular guy in school who is also the star volleyball player, has the four-leaf clover mark on his shoulder.

Yan Yan then decides that Mia should join the school's beach volleyball team so that Ah Sun will notice her. In order to do so, they go through different schemes and fail until they get Ah Kiu to help them, pretending to be Mia and playing amazingly at volleyball while Ah Sun is watching. Ah Sun, of course being the captain of the volleyball team, decides to recommend the "amazing" volleyball player Mia into the team. Ah Sun slowly develops a love for Mia thinking she is a beautiful girl in his school who shares his love of volleyball, both interest and skill wise. Soon after, Mia and Ah Sun start dating.

Though they could trick Ah Sun once, they cannot do the same thing during practice, therefore leading a very suspicious coach and teammates into their hands. Dealing with the school's most popular girl, Eugene, and her buddies, Yan Yan and Mia play a game of volleyball against them. Ah Kiu coming to the rescue just in time, beats Eugene for them, earning her a direct pass into the volleyball team. Mia's volleyball playing days do not last long for after a few practices the coach decides to get rid of her as well. However, Ah Sun comes to the rescue and declares that her ability to play amazingly is not at its best level since she injured herself in a game. Negotiating with the coach, Ah Sun helps Mia stay on the team as the second manager.

In a series of events the Yip sisters soon discover another guy in their school bearing the four-leaf clover birthmark. This guy is the school's rumored bad boy Nic Fong (Vin Choi). Though she has begun dating Ah Sun, Mia discovers that her mind always trails back to Nic. Furthermore, she tells him to join the volleyball team in response to hearing him confess that he's been secretly watching her dance after school and how beautiful he thought she was. She was convinced by her sisters that she should tell him to join the team so that she can have a chance to be close to him and see if he was the guy for her instead of Ah Sun.

The story continues in complication as Ah Kiu begins to realize that she has liked Ah Sun from the beginning. Though she has always believed that she is unlike the normal bubbly girl that is head over heals for a popular pretty boy like Ah Sun, her jealousy towards Mia and Ah Sun's relationship grows as they become closer. Though the best friend of Ah Sun, Ah Kit, repeatedly reminds her that his love for her is never ending, she does not respond to it and only becomes more and more jealous and miserable.

== Character bio ==
Yue Yat Sun (Chinese: 于逸臣) - Captain of the Beach Volleyball Team. He is kind and sweet, and is loved by all the girls at school. He is also the only son of a wealthy family. As soon as the Yip sisters find out that he has the four-leaf clover birthmark on the back of his shoulder, they decide to get Mia into the Beach Volleyball Team in order to get closer to him. Mia and Ah Sun start dating soon after, though their chemistry slowly dies off when Mia and Ah Sun discover their love for each other was only sudden infatuation. On the last episode, Ah Sun doesn't officially have the breakup talk with Mia, but both of them begin dating someone else, for Ah Sun, he begins dating Ah Kiu, Mia's little sister.

Mia / Yip Ching (Mia / Chinese: 葉菁) - The eldest sister. She was told by the fortune teller to look for her Prince Charming when she turns 18, otherwise her family's fortune and happiness will be ruined for eternity. With her sisters' help, she joins the Female Beach Volleyball Team, but is later caught of her inability to play, and Ah Sun recommends her as the boy team's representative. Her relationship with Ah Sun becomes crippled when she finds Nic, the school's bad student, with an identical four-leaf clover birthmark on his back. Being indecisive since she was a child she can't choose between the two boys who have the same four-leaf clover birthmark causing Ah Sun and Ah Kiu to be in deep, deep misery, along with herself. In the final episode, she finally discovers where her heart belongs and begins dating Nic, the rumored bad student.

Nic / Lik Fong (Nic / Chinese: 方力) - The so-called bad student. Being a loner and distrustful of others, he doesn't like to talk much about his family situation or his feelings. He has been in love with Mia ever since he saw her dance. Eventually, she convinces him to join the Beach Volleyball Team. After a heart-to-heart with Mia, he becomes more open to other people. Like Ah Sun, he has a four-leaf clover birthmark on his back, which makes things difficult when Mia finds out she has two princes to choose. In the final episode, this ambiguous relationship comes to an end when Mia finally realizes that she is in love with Nic.

Yip Kiu (Chinese: 葉蕎) - A good-hearted, but boyish girl - she is the middle sister. She likes sports and dancing. During freetime she volunteers to help people. She is in love with Ah Sun, but doesn't dare to say it because he has the four-leaf clover birthmark, meaning he is her sister's Prince Charming. She joins the Female Beach Volleyball Team after Ah Sun's persuasion and often teams up with Yan-Yan. On one occasion, she has a fight with Mia because of her inability to decide whether she loves Ah Sun or Nic, but they quickly make up afterward. In the final episode, Mia chooses Nic over Ah Sun, who finds himself already in love with Ah Kiu. From then on, they become an official couple.

Yip Yan (Chinese: 葉茵) - Yan-Yan is the youngest of the three sisters, she's pretty much the typical high school girl: beautiful, boy-crazed and fashion-sensed, but also intelligent. She likes good-looking guys, and believes in rumors about Nic Fong, the school's bad student. Although she likes good-looking guys with family fortunes, she acknowledges that none of neither has to do with what she really wants: true love. Ever since she saw Chi-Ping in school, playing with kittens and helping people, she's been in love with him. One day, she finally steps out of the tree and talk to him, and from then on they become friends and eventually lovers.

Wong Siu Kit (Chinese: 王少傑) - Second-in-command in the Beach Volleyball Team. He is best friends with Ah Sun, and is very daring when it comes to sports. Kit is in love with Ah Kiu, but is afraid of being rejected and so he decides to remain friends with her. During a volleyball contest, he twists his ankle and is unable to play with Ah Sun throughout the finals. At the end of the episode, his wound is completely healed.

Cheung Lap Gong (Chinese: 張立剛) - Coach of the Beach Volleyball Team; bad-tempered and stubborn. He is strict, but does what he thinks is best for the team. He was together with a teacher before they broke up, but eventually, they made up and went back together - and ever since then he's shown more compassion towards other people.

Kwan Kit Lam (Chinese: 關筱男) - A school teacher that drives a motorcycle, not very liked by other teachers. Because she went through the same kind of adolescence, she understands Nic's situation better than most people and tries her best to help him. She was together with Coach Cheung before breaking up with him. But eventually, they make up.

Mon Mon / Fong Man (Mon Mon/Chinese: 方敏) - Nic's little sister. She used to be energetic, before having the fatal disease - leukemia. She therefore can't stay outside for too long without suffering sunlight, and Nic is responsible in taking care of her.

Leung Chi-Ping (Chinese: 梁志平) - A carefree and sweet-hearted young man. Yan-Yan has liked him ever since she saw him in the school, playing with some cats and helping a granny picking up her garbage. Yan-Yan watched him work three times before she actually spoke with him face-to-face, and since then they began dating. He is practically the kind of boyfriend any girl could ever ask for - sweet and loving, although he is a bit naive. In the final episode, he is revealed to have a four-leaf clover birthmark, like Ah Nic and Ah Sun, though it's on his neck and hardly noticeable.

Wong Sau Han (Chinese: 黃秀杏) - The principal's daughter and the representative for the beach volleyball team before Mia becomes the second representative, handling the boys' team. Like most girls at school, she's in love with Ah Sun, and isn't afraid to show it. She also dislikes the Yip sisters, because Ah Sun is dating Mia, and co-operates with Eugenia to get rid of her. But their malicious attempt lead them into a huge consequence. However, the forgiving sisters save them out of the disaster. After this, they officially become best friends.

Eugenia / Eugene / Lei Lai Mei (Eugenia / Eugene / Chinese: 李麗媚) - The captain of the female Beach Volleyball Team. She is also in love with Ah Sun, and she dislikes the Yip sisters, because Ah Sun is dating Mia, and cooperates with Ah Han to get rid of her. But their malicious attempt lead them into a huge consequence. However, the forgiving sisters save them out of the disaster. After this, they become best friends.

== Cast ==
The Girls:

- Vivien Yeo as Yip Ching (Mia)
- Charmaine Li as Yip Kiu (Ah Kiu)
- Yoyo Chen as Yip Yan (Yan-Yan)

The Boys:

- Charles Szeto as Yue Yat Sun (Ah Sun)
- Vin Choi as Nic Fong (Ah Nic)
- Tingo Wu as Cyrus
- Bond Chan as Kit

Supporting Cast:

- Lawrence Cheng as the 3 girls' dad
- Koey Wong as Eugenia (Eugen)
- Jenny Cheung as Principal's daughter (Han)
- Joe Ma as Coach Cheung
- Cathy Tsui as Miss Kwan
- Monie Tung as Mon Mon
- Vivien Lok Lok as Eugen's best friend
- Patricia Liu as Teacher/Nancy
- Jenny Yan as the sisters' aunt
- Sky as male volleyball players
- Maria Chan
- Jolie Chan as Ada
- Carlene Aguilar as Amy
- Yu Yeung as doctor
- Jiri Tam as Leung Chi Ping
- Bruce Leung as school announcer

== Soundtrack ==
A Soundtrack CD containing the songs played in the series was also produced. "赤沙印記@四葉草2 Soundtrack CD" (English name: "Sunshine Heartbeat TV Series Soundtrack") was released on December 9, 2004. In addition to the themesong, it includes mandarin, cantonese and English songs.

Track Listing:

- 01. Find Your Love - FI/Roxane Lo/ Peggy Lee (赤沙印記@四葉草2 主題曲)
- 02. You Were Meant For Me - 薛凱琪
- 03. 陌生人 - 蔡健雅
- 04. Runnin' Away - Patrick Nuo
- 05. 遇見 (Encounter) - 孫燕姿 (Stefanie Sun)
- 06. If - Bread
- 07. Blues Del Bar (Mood Music)
- 08. Make It With You - Bread
- 09. Sunny Beat (Mood Music)
- 10. 風箏 - 孫燕姿
- 11. 尋夢之途 - F.I.R.
- 12. Wrong - Kimberley Locke
- 13. 夏意識 - 郭富城
- 14. 夏日劇集 - 梁詠琪
- 15. 5 Days - Patrick Nuo
- 16. 光芒 - F.I.R.
- 17. Fresh Love (Mood Music)

Some songs that were played in the series but were not included in the soundtrack are:

- It's Alright - Kimberley Locke
- Pretty Boy - M2M
- Don't Say You Love Me - M2M
- Is You - M2M
