= Yoyo Chen =

Hong Kong actress and model

- 陳自瑤
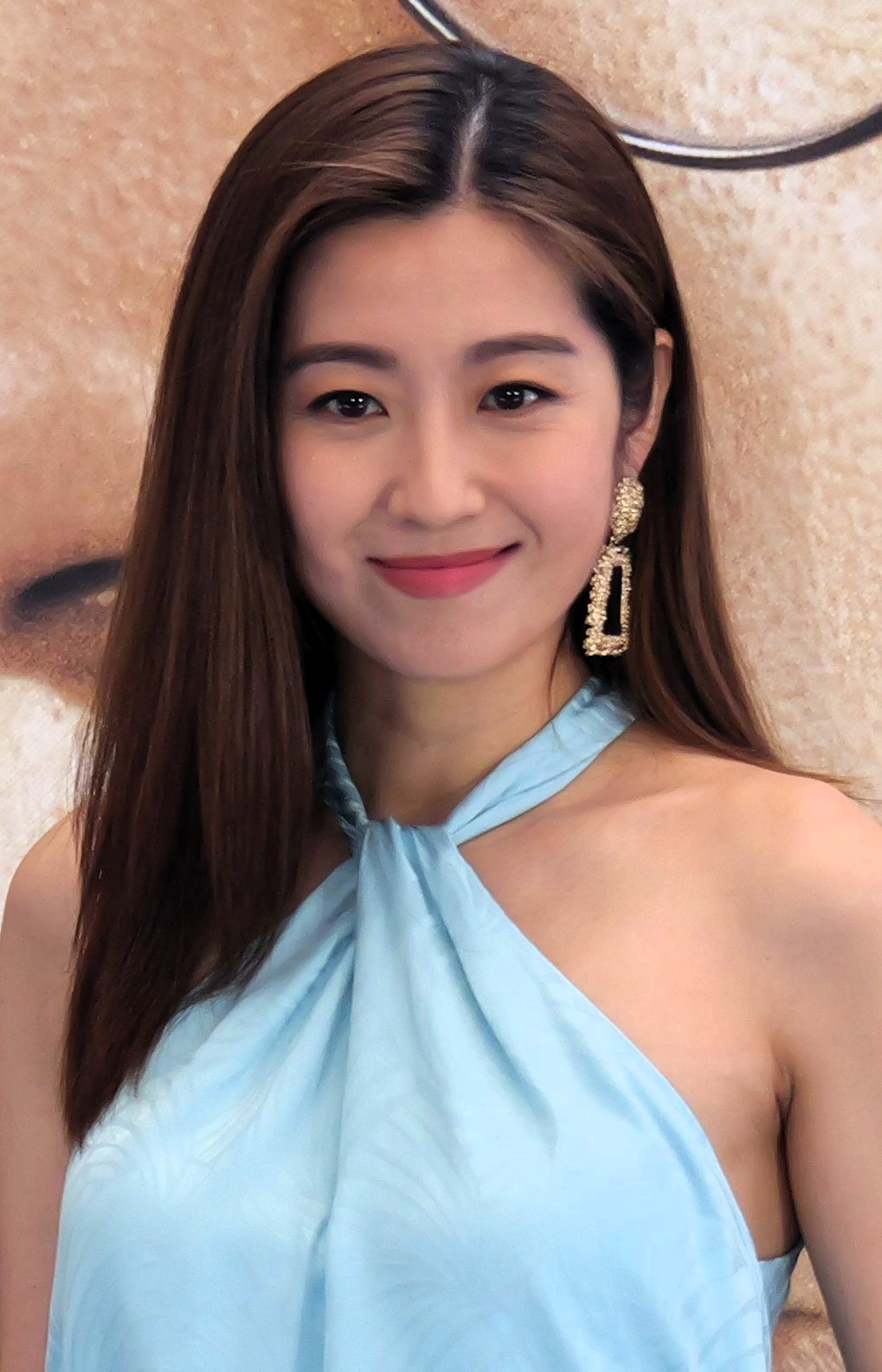
- Chen in March 2024
- Born: 26 August 1981 (age 45); British Hong Kong
- Occupations: Actress; model
- Years active: 2004–present
- Notable work: Life After Death; Plan 'B'
- Spouse: Vincent Wong (m. 2011)
- Children: 1 daughter (Wong Ching-kiu)
- Awards: TVB Anniversary Awards – Best Supporting Actress; 2021 Plan 'B'

Chinese name
- Traditional Chinese: 陳自瑤
- Simplified Chinese: 陈自瑶
Transcriptions
Standard Mandarin
- Hanyu Pinyin: chén zì yáo
Yue: Cantonese
- Jyutping: can4 zi6 jiu4

Yoyo Chen Chi-yiu (born 26 August 1981) is a Hong Kong television actress and model contracted to TVB.

== Biography ==
=== Early life ===
Yoyo Chen was born in Hong Kong and is of Fuzhounese ancestry. She finished secondary 7 and graduated from Po Kok Girls' Middle School at Happy Valley, Hong Kong.

=== Career ===
After signing an artiste contract with TVB, Chen made her acting debut in the 2004 drama Sunshine Heartbeat. After several minor roles, Chen began to receive bigger roles in the 2007 dramas The Brink of Law and Best Selling Secrets, earning her first nominations for the Most Improved Female Artiste and Best Supporting Actress at the 2007 TVB Anniversary Awards.

In 2020, Chen received attention and positive comments with her role in the melodrama Life After Death. She gained recognition by earning a Best Supporting Actress nomination as well as garnering her first nominations for Most Popular Female Character and Most Popular Onscreen Partnership (with Priscilla Wong and Shiga Lin) at the 2020 TVB Anniversary Awards.

In 2021, Chen participated in the reality competition shows Dub of War (好聲好戲) and Top Sales (識貨), eventually winning both competitions. With her role in the drama Plan 'B', she won the Best Supporting Actress award at the 2021 TVB Anniversary Awards, which is her first acting award in her career.

== Personal life ==
On 11 November 2011, Chen married TVB actor Vincent Wong. She gave birth to their daughter, Wong Ching-kiu, in April 2012.

For years, Wong and Chen refused to talk about each other in interviews, giving the impression that they led separate lives. When Wong won Best Actor in 2020, Chen remained expressionless and left separately after the awards ceremony.

Chen is close friends with Life After Death co-actresses Priscilla Wong and Shiga Lin. Another good friend of her is The Line Watchers co-actress Mandy Wong.

== Filmography ==
=== TV dramas ===
Year	Title	Role	Notes
2004	Sunshine Heartbeat	Yip Yan (葉茵)	Major Supporting Role
2005	Women on the Run	Tsui Sze-yan (徐思欣)	Ep. 3
2005	The Zone	May	Cameo
2006	Welcome to the House	Amela Nga Mei-na (亞美娜)	Cameo
2006	Forensic Heroes	"Ling" Tam Lai-ling (譚麗玲)	Ep. 1
2007	The Brink of Law	Tong Tsz-man (唐芷敏)	Supporting Role
2007–2008	Best Selling Secrets	Kawaii Ho Tung-tung (何彤彤)	Supporting Role
2007	Survivor's Law II	Stephy Tsui Sze-lok (徐思樂)	Ep. 3
2008	Wars of In-Laws II	young Fiona Gor Pik (青年戈碧)	Cameo
2008	Phoenix Rising	Wong Yi-mui (黃二梅)	Supporting Role
2008	The Master of Tai Chi	So Hung-ling (蘇紅菱)	Supporting Role
2008	Catch Me Now	Cheng Yan-yan (鄭欣欣)	Ep. 14, 17
2009	Beyond the Realm of Conscience	Chin Fei-yin (錢飛燕)	Supporting Role
2010	Don Juan DeMercado	Herself (陳自瑤)	Guest Appearance
2010	A Pillow Case of Mystery II	Princess Sin Sin (倩倩公主)	Supporting Role
2010	Beauty Knows No Pain	Stephy	Cameo
2010	Can't Buy Me Love	Princess Chuen Ping (川平公主)	Supporting Role
2011	A Great Way to Care	Martha Cheng Sum-yau (鄭心柔)	Supporting Role
2011	Only You	Paula	Cameo
2011	Relic of an Emissary	Luk Yuen-ting / Wai Lin (陸苑莛 / 惠蓮)	Supporting Role
2011	My Sister of Eternal Flower	Agnes To Ting (杜婷)	Supporting Role
2011	The Other Truth	Ho Hoi-lun (何凱倫)	Ep. 5–8
2011–2012	Bottled Passion	Man Yuk-fung (文玉鳳)	Ep. 1
2012	L'Escargot	Puk King (卜瓊)	Supporting Role
2012	Queens of Diamonds and Hearts	Tsui Kei / Tsui Sim (徐姫 / 徐嬋)	Supporting Role
2012	House of Harmony and Vengeance	Kuk Wan-wan (曲灣灣)	Major Supporting Role
2012	Tiger Cubs	Ching Yuen-ting (程婉婷)	Ep. 12
2013	Karma Rider	Wu Dip (胡蝶)	Major Supporting Role
2014	Ghost Dragon of Cold Mountain	Chau Yuet (秋月)	Supporting Role
2014	Overachievers	Tong Ching (湯晴)	Supporting Role
2014–2015	Noblesse Oblige	Bak Hau-ling (白巧)	Major Supporting Role
2015	Wudang Rules	Ho Ching-lam (何靖嵐)	Cameo Appearance
2016	Short End of the Stick	Wan Tai-chi (雲大芝)	Supporting Role
2016	Presumed Accidents	Angelina Choi Sze-ying (蔡詩英)	Ep. 5–7
2016	Two Steps From Heaven	Lam Shu-yu (林書榆)	Supporting Role
2016	No Reserve	Lau Wan-yau (劉溫柔)	Major Supporting Role
2017	Nothing Special Force	Chan Yuen-fa (陳婉花)	Ep. 1–4
2018	Succession War	Liugiya Ching-yee (劉佳．晴兒)	Supporting Role
2018	Another Era	Ada Chung Sze-kei (鍾思琪)	Supporting Role
2019	Justice Bao：The First Year	Shui Ling-lung (水玲瓏)	Supporting Role
2020	Of Greed and Ants	Chow Ming-yuet (周明月)	Supporting Role
2020	Life After Death	Sabrina Chin Li-woon (錢莉媛)	Major Supporting Role
2021	The Runner	Rickie Ying Ho-chi (刑可梔)	Major Supporting Role
2021	Plan 'B'	Yip Fan (葉帆)	Major Supporting Role; TVB Anniversary Award for Best Supporting Actress
2021	The Line Watchers	Yip Kai-on (葉佳安)	Major Supporting Role
2021	Kids’ Lives Matter	young Chung Wai-sheung (青年鍾懷霜)	Younger version of Mimi Kung's character
2021	Used Good	Yung Kwai-fun (容桂芬)	Ep. 6–10
2022	My Mom, My Ping Pong	Kong Tsz-yan (江芷昕)	Main Role
2022–2023	The Perfect Man	Yeung Fei-wan (楊飛雲)	Major Supporting Role
2024	Happily Ever After?	Emma Cheung Ming-sum (張明芯)	Main Role

=== Film ===
Year	Title	Role	Notes
2001	Gimme Gimme	Pat	
2002	Fighting to Survive	Michelle Chan	aka Bodyguard of the Neighbourhood
2002	Possessed	Yen	aka Demon Possession
2004	Papa Loves You	Yumiko	
2005	A.V.		
2006	Love Him, Love Family		
2010	72 Tenants of Prosperity	sales of Shek Kin's store	
2011	Life Without Principle		
2011	I Love Hong Kong		

== Awards and nominations ==
=== TVB Anniversary Awards ===
Year	Category	Drama / Role	Result
2007	Most Improved Female Artiste	Best Selling Secrets and The Brink of Law	Nominated
2007	Best Supporting Actress	Best Selling Secrets — Ho Tung-tung	Nominated
2016	Best Supporting Actress	Short End of the Stick — Wan Tai-chi	Nominated
2020	Best Supporting Actress	Life After Death — Chin Li-woon (Sabrina)	Nominated
2020	Most Popular Female Character	Life After Death — Chin Li-woon (Sabrina)	Nominated
2020	Most Popular Onscreen Partnership	Life After Death (shared with Priscilla Wong and Shiga Lin)	Nominated
2021	Best Supporting Actress	Plan 'B' — Yip Fan	Won
2021	Best Supporting Actress	The Line Watchers — Yip Kai-on	Nominated
2021	Most Popular Female Character	Plan 'B' — Yip Fan	Nominated
2021	Most Popular Onscreen Partnership	The Line Watchers (shared with C-Kwan)	Nominated
2022	Best Actress	My Mom, My Ping Pong — Kong Tsz-yan	Nominated
2022	Most Popular Female Character	My Mom, My Ping Pong — Kong Tsz-yan	Nominated
2022	Favourite TVB Actress in Malaysia	My Mom, My Ping Pong — Kong Tsz-yan	Nominated
2023	Best Supporting Actress	The Perfect Man — Yeung Fei-wan	Nominated

=== People's Choice Television Awards ===
Year	Category	Drama / Role	Result
2021	People's Choice Best Supporting Actress	Plan 'B' — Yip Fan	Top 10 (Ranked 6th)

=== Other awards ===
Year	TV Show	Result
2021	Dub of War (戲) — Champion	Won
2021	Top Sales (識貨) — Champion	Won
