= In the Realm of Success =

Hong Kong romantic comedy television show

- Official poster
- 公私戀事多
- Genre: Modern Drama, Romance, Comedy
- Created by: Hong Kong Television Broadcasts Limited
- Written by: Bau Wai-chung, Kwan Bing-hung, So Bo-ling
- Directed by: Chung Shu-gai
- Starring: Steven Ma; Nadia Chan; Michael Tong; Claire Yiu
- Theme music composer: Lee Kyung Sub
- Opening theme: I Value You (重視你) by Steven Ma
- Country of origin: Hong Kong
- Original language: Cantonese
- No. of episodes: 20

Production
- Executive producer: Catherine Tsang
- Producer: Alfred Tsui
- Production location: Hong Kong
- Editor: Bau Wai-chung
- Camera setup: Multi camera
- Running time: 45 minutes
- Production company: TVB

Original release
- Network: TVB Jade
- Release: 17 September – 12 October 2001

In the Realm of Success
- Chinese: 公私戀事多
- Literal meaning: "Public And Private Business Affairs"
Transcriptions
Standard Mandarin
- Hanyu Pinyin: gōng sī liàn shì duō
Yue: Cantonese
- Jyutping: gung1 si1 lyun2 si6 do1

In the Realm of Success (Chinese: 公私戀事多; Jyutping: gung1 si1 lyun2 si6 do1; literally "Public and Private Business Affairs") is a 2001 Hong Kong romantic comedy television drama created and produced by TVB, starring Steven Ma, Adia Chan, Michael Tong and Claire Yiu as the main cast. Original broadcast began on Hong Kong's Jade channel from September 17 to October 12, 2001 every Monday through Friday during its 7:30 to 8:30 p.m. timeslot with 20 episodes total.

== Synopsis ==
Chu Ho Yin (Steven Ma) has just returned to Hong Kong after studying hotel management abroad. On a bus ride home from the airport he sees a man have an epilepsy seizure, everyone else on the bus minds their own business except Ho Yin. While trying to prevent the man from biting his tongue, Ho Yin's hand gets bitten and he begs the girl Chong Mei Kei (Nadia Chan), sitting next to the man for help. At first she refuses, but when she does Ho Yin uses her cellphone to prevent the man from biting his tongue. At the hospital Mei Kei demands Ho Yin repay for her cellphone as it seems the hospital has lost or stolen her cell phone while treating the man with a seizure. Since Ho Yin just got off a plane he only has US$20 on him, Mei Kei deems it as bad luck and takes his US$20 even though her cellphone cost HK$3000.

After going to numerous meaningless job interviews, Ho Yin is unable to find a job. His father who happens to be head of security at a five star hotel pulls some strings and gets him a job in the public relations department at the hotel he works for. Mei Kei happens to work in the public relations department for the same hotel. Mei Kei is not happy to see Ho Yin as she sees him as a jinx since every time she encounters him she has bad luck.

The second son of the hotel owner, Tong Chong Man (Michael Tong) comes back home from his studies abroad. His father wants him to learn about the hotel by working for every department at the hotel for a while. Since non of the department heads wants to offend his older half-brother who is the heir apparent to the hotel, they all refuse to take him in except Ho Yin's father. After working in the security department other departments soon relentlessly let him work with them. Ho Yin and Chong Man soon becomes friends since Ho Yin is the only one that reached out to him at work.

Not happy with just standing around, Chong Man creates an IT department at the hotel that will be in charge of creating and managing the Hotel's website. Chong Man is unable to convince anyone to transfer to the IT department as everyone does not believe the department will succeed, except Ho Yin. Ho Yin's father is not happy that he is transferring to the IT department since he's afraid Ho Yin will be out of a job if the IT department does not succeed. With Ho Yin working in the IT department, Mei Kei and others soon transfer to the department too. Feelings soon develops between Ho Yin and Mei Kei due to working so closely with each other, but Chong Man also develops feelings for Mei Kei. Ho Yin knows about Chong Man's feelings for Mei Kei and steps aside as he doesn't want to compete with Chong Man over Mei Kei.

Just when the IT department completes the hotel's website, Chong Man's older half-brother feels threaten and jealous. He gets one of the IT department workers to sabotage the presentation on the night of the website unveiling by switching the presentation film with a porn movie. Chong Man feels ashamed by the incident and hides from everyone. He older brother takes over the hotel when their father has a stroke and falls into a coma. But his older brother's wife has become feed up with his philandering ways and has private detectives trail his every move. She uses his mistress rendezvous and hotel embezzlement evidence to blackmail him into leaving his mistress, but he calls her bluff. Upset and heartbroken by his actions she takes the evidence to the ICAC to ruin him.

The hotel goes into serious debt because Chong Man's older half-brother's bad management of the hotel. In order to save the family hotel Chong Man is forced to marry his former classmate from a wealthy family. Since the hotel is still recovering financially some employees are transferred overseas to work in other hotels. Mei Kei becomes one of these employees. Even though Ho Yin knows she will be leaving Hong Kong soon, he still would not confess his feelings to her which makes Mei Kei mad at him. The night before Mei Kei is to leave Ho Yin works up the courage and ask Mei Kei to meet him at their usually location, but she is still mad at him and doesn't show up. A typhoon hits Hong Kong and the news weather reports captures Ho Yin waiting for someone in the dangerous elements. Worried about Ho Yin Mei Kei goes to their usual place to look for him and reaches the place when Ho Yin is about to broad an ambulance. Ho Yin tells Mei Kei that he is okay, that he just has hypothermia and then confesses his feelings for her.

== Cast ==
=== Chu family ===
- Johnny Ngan as Chu Mun Tong 朱滿堂

Chu Ho Yin's father and Kam Ngan Sin's husband. He is head of security of a five star hotel. At work he is an extremely strict boss who even goes to work on his day off just to check on his department to make sure no one is slacking off. In private is a gullible person who often gets taken advantage of.

- Chan Ka-yee as Kam Ngan Sin 金銀仙

Chu Ho Yin's mother and Chu Mun Tong's wife. She often has to lecture her husband as he gets taken advantage of and step all over for being nice.

- Tam Sin-hung as Leung Choi Yuk 梁彩玉

Chu Ho Yin maternal grandmother and Kam Ngan Sin's mother. She is an extremely superstitious person. She has the same mindset as her daughter and often nags her son-in-law Chu Man Tong.

- Steven Ma as Chu Ho Yin 朱浩然

Chu Mun Tong and Kam Ngan Sin's son. Leung Choi Yuk's grandson. He is called piggy by his family. Just came back to Hong Kong after studying abroad. Originally worked in the public relations department and later transferred to the IT department. He likes Chong Mei Kei but to afraid to confess his feelings since his friend Tong Chong Man like her too. He builds up the courage to confess his feelings for her when she is about to leave Hong Kong.

=== Chong family ===
- Angelina Lo as Yeung Chui Ying 楊翠英

Chong Mei Kei and Chong Mei Yee's single mother. She does not like Mei Kei's boyfriend Fung Fuk Ngai as she feels he takes advantage of her daughter's kindness.

- Adia Chan as Chong Mei Kei 莊美琪

Yeung Chui Ying's daughter and Chong Mei Yee's older sister. She works in the public relations department at the hotel. She is always singled out by her despicable boss and taken advantage of co-workers who trick her into doing their work. She meets Chu Ho Yin on a bus and hates him as she thinks he is a jinx. When the two become co-workers and him consoling her during her breakup with her cheating ex-boyfriend she develops feelings for him. The two officially become a couple when she is about to leave Hong Kong.

- Claire Yiu as Chong Mei Yee 莊美儀

Yeung Chui Ying's daughter and Chong Mei Kei's younger sister. She works at the hotel in the fitness faculty as an instructor. Her goal is to hook a wealthy man who she scopes for at the hotel. She likes Tong Chong Man because of his background. Was in a somewhat relationship with Chu Chi Keung when she thought he was rich.

=== Tong family ===
- Kwan Hoi-san as Tong Hok Lim 唐學濂

Tsui Hok Lim and Lee Siu You's husband. Tong Yee Man, Tong Bak Man and Tong Chong Man's father. The elderly owner of the hotel. He is extremely frugal.

- Pak Yan as Tsui Sau Chu 徐秀珠

Tong Hok Lim wife number one. Tong Yee Man and Tong Bak Man's mother. She is extremely jealous when her husband gives attention to his second wife Lee Siu You.

- Mary Hon as Lee Siu You 李小柔

Tong Hok Lim wife number two. Tong Chong Man's mother. She was a former maid of the Tong household. Not wanting to be confrontational she ignores all the harshness of first wife Tsui Sau Chu.

- Michelle Fung as Tong Yee Man 唐綺文

Tong Hok Lim and Tsui Sau Chu's daughter. The oldest child of the Tong family. A vain person who is a publicity hound. She uses her family connection to take advantage of the hotels facilities.

- Timothy Cheng as Tong Bak Man 唐伯文

Tong Hok Lim and Tsui Sau Chu's son. Heir apparent to the hotel. He feels threaten of his position when his younger half-brother returns to Hong Kong and starts working at the hotel. He conspires with the hotels head management to sabotage his younger brother's work. He is ruined when his wife turns in evidence of his dirty business dealings to the ICAC.

- Akina Hong as Wan Mei-lin 溫美蓮

Tong Bak Man's long suffering wife. She loves her husband but he does not care about her feelings and cheats opening with his mistress.

- Michael Tong as Tong Chong Man 唐仲文

Tong Hok Lim and Lee Siu You's son. Being the son of the second wife he does not get respect from his older siblings and staff at the hotel. Wanting to prove he is not a useless heir like his older half-brother, he starts the IT department at the hotel but his brother sabotages his work. Chong Mei Kei consoles him when he is down and he starts to like him. Due to his older half-brother business dealings the hotel goes into debt. He is forced to marry his former wealthy classmate Joyce. whom he does not love in order to save the hotel.

- Iris Wong as Joyce

Tong Chong Man's former classmate. She has liked him since they were classmates and agrees to marry him, not knowing he is only doing so to save his family business.

=== Hotel staff ===
- Albert Law as Kong Hoi Sing 江成海

The head of staff at the hotel. He sides with Tong Bak Man and sabotages Tong Chong Man as he thinks Bak Man will be the heir to take over the hotel.

- Kwok Tak-san as Wilson

Head of the human resource department. He helps gets Chu Ho Yin hired at the hotel because he is friends with Chu Mun Tong.

- Leung Kin-ping as Stephen
- Ceci So as Connie

Head of the accounting department at the hotel.

- Jerry Koo as Chung Bong 鐘邦
- Celine Ma as Chan Siu Mei 陳小媚

Head of the public relations department at the hotel. She is a despicable boss who blame others for her mistakes and takes credits for other's hard work.

- Margaret Chung as Clara

Chong Mei Kei's co-worker in the public relations department. She takes advantage of Mei Kei's kindness and also credit for work Mei Kei done. She like Tong Chong Man because he save her from her possessive ex-boyfriend.

- June Chan as Winnie

Chong Mei Kei's co-worker in the public relations department.

- Sunny Tai as Hom Dan 咸蛋

Chong Mei Kei's co-worker in the public relations department.

- Li Shing-cheong as John
- Lau Wing-kin as Chu Chi Keung 朱自強

Chu Ho Yin's friend who he recommends a job at the hotel. He is a slacker who doesn't do any work. Wanting to work for Tong Bak Man, he sabotages Tong Chong Man's IT project.

- Jason Lam as Jason
- Catherine Chau as Cindy
- Jenny Wong as Yung jie 蓉姐

Chong Mei Kei's co-worker in the public relations department. A middle age woman with children to take care of.

- Peter Pang as Security Bo 保安寶

Chu Mun Tong's underlings in the hotels security department.

- Alan Mak as Security Ciu 保安釗

Chu Mun Tong's underlings in the hotels security department.

=== Extended cast ===
- Evergreen Mak as Fung Fuk Ngai 馮福蔭

Chong Mei Kei's ex-boyfriend. He likes to leech off of her even though he works at a bank. Just when the two are about to get marry, Mei Kei finds out he has been cheating on her.

- Henry Lo as Wai Ding On 衛定安

Tong Hok Lim's personal assistant.

- So Lai-ming as Nurse 護士
- Chiu Hung as Dat 達

Fong's husband. They own a dry goods store that they rent from Chu Mun Tong. Knowing Mun Tong's kindness he does not pay rent.

- Mo-Lin Yu as Fong 芳

Dat's wife. Runs a dry goods store with her husband.

- Angela Tong as Yan Wai Wai 演衛維

Tong Bak Man's mistress. Knowing that Bak Man fancies her more than his wife Wan Mei-lin, she goes to her boutique to start trouble which gets photographed all over the tabloids.
