= Stephen Wong Ka-lok =

Hong Kong actor (born 1978)

Stephen Wong Ka Lok
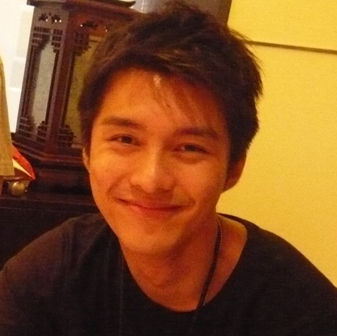
- Wong in 2008
- Born: 14 December 1978 (age 47); Hong Kong
- Occupation: Actor
- Spouse: Samantha Kong Wai-yin (m. 2022)

Chinese name
- Traditional Chinese: 黃嘉樂
- Simplified Chinese: 黄嘉乐
Transcriptions
Standard Mandarin
- Hanyu Pinyin: Huáng Jiālè

Stephen Wong Ka-Lok (Chinese: 黃嘉樂, born 14 December 1978) is a Hong Kong actor previously contracted to TVB.

== Biography ==
Prior to joining TVB, Wong wanted to be a customs officer.

Wong later worked for a telecommunications company. During his time there, he sought to enroll in training courses offered by the company in order to further his education and professional development. However, because he had worked there for only two years, he was not yet eligible for the programme.

Wong went to the Television Broadcasts Limited (TVB) Station to perform inspection on its telephone systems, he was approached by a personnel of the acting division. Asked if he is interested in being an actor, Wong first thought was how tough life as an artist would be (he has been on modelling jobs at that time and so had some ideas of such a lifestyle). However, he has some time for consideration and only made his decision after seeking advice from friends and family. Upon casting, he joined the 17th TVB Acting Class.

After joining TVB, Wong had played supporting roles in numerous television dramas. In December 2022, Wong’s contract with TVB ended.

== Theatre ==
- Love's Labour's Won (才子亂點俏佳人) (2010)

== Filmography ==
=== Films ===
- Super Models (2015)
- The Seventh Lie (2014)
- Badges of Fury (2013)
- Will You Still Love Me Tomorrow? (2013)
- Nightfall (2012)
- Choy Lee Fut (蔡李佛) (2011)
- Forgive and Forget (亲愛的) (2008)
- L For Love♥ L For Lies (我的最愛) (2008)

=== Dubbing ===
- Dub of War's Second Season Graduation Project- Spider-Man: No Way Home (2022) - News anchor and Couch Wilson

=== TV dramas ===
Year	Title	Role	Notes
2001–2002	Virtues of Harmony 《皆大歡喜》	Dickson	
2002	Let's Face It 《無考不成冤家》	Tam Tin Ping	
2003	Not Just A Pretty Face 《美麗在望》	Lo Chun Lung	
2003	The King of Yesterday and Tomorrow 《九五至尊》	Athlete	
2003	Better Halves 《金牌冰人》	Pedestrian	
2003	Survivor's Law 《律政新人王》		
2003	Triumph in the Skies 《衝上雲宵》	Li Tze Wai	
2004	Shine On You 《青出於藍》	Lau Kwok Wah	
2004	Net Deception 《追魂交易》	Leung Ka-Chung	
2005	The Academy 《學警雄心》		
2005	Love Bond 《心花放》	Tung Yan	
2005	Wars of In-Laws 《我的野蠻奶奶》	Cheung Yau-Nin	
2005	Real Kung Fu 《佛山贊師父》	Lui Bing	
2005	When Rules Turn Loose 《識法代言人》	Pang Kar Wai	
2006	Trimming Success 《飛短留長父子兵》	Fan Tin-Ming (Kenny)	
2006	Land of Wealth 《匯通天下》	Fu Yee-Chek	
2007	The Brink of Law 《突圍行動》	Tung Yat-Long	
2007	Treasure Raiders 《蕭十一郎》	Fei Ma Tong Dai Tze	
2007	Ten Brothers 《十兄弟》		
2007	Best Bet 《迎妻接福》	Chuk Tin Sau	
2007	Steps 《舞動全城》	Yau Shang-Dat	
2008	A Journey Called Life 《金石良緣》	Cheung Jan-Hing	
2008	Forensic Heroes 2 《法證先鋒》	Fu Ching-Kei	
2008	Speech of Silence 《甜言蜜語》	Chai Ka-On	
2009	Burning Flame III 《烈火雄心3》	Ko Ho-Nam	
2009	Rosy Business 《巾幗梟雄》	Younger version of Cheung Kiu	
2009	D.I.E. Again 《古靈精探B》	Wong Tong	
2010	A Fistful of Stances 《鐵馬尋橋》	Koo Yu-yan	
2010	Can't Buy Me Love 《zh:公主嫁到》		
2010	Every Move You Make 《:讀心神探》		
2011	A Great Way to Care 《仁心解碼》	Cheng Sum-kit	
2011	Only You 《只有您》		
2011	Yes, Sir. Sorry, Sir! 《點解阿Sir係阿Sir》	Kong Tung Leung	
2011	Ghetto Justice 《怒火街頭》	Ko Wing-leung	
2011	The Other Truth 《真相》	Chow Chow	
2011	The Life and Times of a Sentinel 《紫禁驚雷》	Nalan Xingde	
2011	Lives of Omission 《潛行狙擊》		
2012	The Greatness of a Hero 《盛世人傑》	Mo Yin-Tak	
2012	House of Harmony and Vengeance 《耀舞長安》	Tai On-nam	
2013	Triumph in the Skies II 《衝上雲宵II》	Li Tze Wai; Victor	
2013	Brother's Keeper 《巨輪》	Kiu Wai-kin	
2014	Storm in a Cocoon 《守業者》	Pang Kwok-leung	
2014	The Ultimate Addiction 《點金勝手》	Ho Seung-hing	
2014	Shades of Life 《我們的天空》	Wai San	
2015	Limelight Years 《華麗轉身》	Fung Ka-ming	
2015	Captain of Destiny 《張保仔》		
2018	Apple-colada 《果欄中的江湖大嫂》	Chan Ching-yong	
2019	My Life As A Loan Shark 《街坊財爺》	Tam Siu-kin	
2020	The Dripping Sauce 《大醬園》	Man Cheuk-nam	Nominated - TVB Anniversary Award for Best Supporting Actor
2021	Sinister Beings 《逆天奇案》	Lee Sai-wah	Nominated - TVB Anniversary Award for Best Supporting Actor
2021	The Kwoks and Whats 《我家無難事》	Mountain Fung Yiu-san	Nominated - TVB Anniversary Award for Best Supporting Actor
2022	Your Highness 《痞子殿下》	Kei Yeung	
2023	Speakers of Law 《法言人》	Will Yu Kwok-tung	
2024	The Spectator 《旁觀者》	Tam Vai Man	
2024	The Fallen Xian 《本尊就位》	Sun Ching-yi	
2025	Other People's Money 《富貴千團》	Fung Chi-sing	
