= The Brink of Law =

- Poster
- 突圍行動
- Genre: Modern Action
- Starring: Michelle Yim; Steven Ma; Ron Ng; Bernice Liu; Shirley Yeung; Elliot Yue; Kate Tsui
- Opening theme: "突圍" by Steven Ma & Ron Ng
- Ending theme: "分手" by Bernice Liu
- Country of origin: Hong Kong
- Original language: Cantonese
- No. of episodes: 25

Production
- Running time: 45 minutes (approx.)

Original release
- Network: TVB
- Release: January 8 – February 9, 2007

The Brink of Law (Traditional Chinese: 突圍行動) is a TVB modern thriller series broadcast in January 2007.

== Synopsis ==
Tong Chi-Ko (Steven Ma) is a respected lawyer and the source of his father's pride; his father dreams of seeing his son becoming a crown attorney for Hong Kong. However, his father (Ha Yu) is addicted to gambling, much to the displeasure of his wife and daughter, and ends up with a dangerous amount of debt. When the father and son spend a day watching a horse race together, Tong Chi-Ko meets Tung Yat-Tsun (Ron Ng), a veterinarian and the nephew of the head of an affluent corporation. They become good friends.

Unknown to Yat-Tsun, his uncle, Tung Chin-Long (Elliot Ngok), is involved with rigging horse races. Tung Chin-Long's wife, Sung Gam-Chi (Michelle Yim), proves to be especially dangerous in insuring the safety of her family, particularly for the future of her favoured older son Tung Yat-Long (Stephen Wong). Her younger son, Tung Yat-Chiu (Vin Choi), ends up being a selfish troublemaker and her niece, Sung Ka-Yee (Shirley Yeung), reveals herself to be manipulative, spiteful, and two-faced.

Tong Chi-Ko's father commits suicide after mistakenly believing his wife and daughter left him because he was unwilling to stop gambling and unable to get out of debt. On the same day Chi-Ko learns that he has achieved what his father had hoped to see. Things become worse when Tong Chin-Long's younger son frames Chi-Ko with possession of illegal drugs, which Yat-Chiu had originally planned to use on Chi Ko's sister, Tong Chi-Man (Yoyo Chen). Chi-Ko loses his licence to practice law, but is able to find work as a legal advisor for Nicholas, Tung Chin-Long's fashion company, with help from Yat-Tsun.

Chi Ko runs into his high school lover Tsui Wing (Bernice Liu) who had left to Canada when they were young and had not been in contact since. They start a budding relationship. Yan Heung-Ming (Kenneth Ma), a police officer, arrests Tung Chin-Long's brother-in-law for bookmarking business. Sung Gam-Chi seeks revenge for her brother by hiring an assassin to kill Ming.

One day, Tsun sees his mother at Nicolas, who had left him right after he was born. She had come to see Tung Chin-Long to get money from him to help with her new husband's financial troubles. Tsun overhears their conversation that Chin-Long had raped her while he was drunk, and that Tsun is actually his son. When Tsun's father, Tung Chin-Pang (Law Lok Lam), hears of this, he has a fierce fight with Chin-Long. Gam-Chi thinks that Tsun wants to take Chin-Long's fortune away from her dearest son Long, who had been paralyzed from a skiing accident, and hires an assassin to kill Tsun. Fearing for Tsun's safety, Chin-Pang decides to relocate to New York with him, with the excuse that he will only undergo surgery for his heart there. Chin-Long quarrels with Chin-Pang for taking his son away from him, and it triggers Chin-Pang's heart attack. Chin-Long deliberately fails to give Chin-Pang his medicine, and Chin-Pang dies. Wing and Chi-Ko break up for a period, only to get back together. Ka-Yee pretends to fall for Yat-Long so that she can take revenge for her father. Gam-Chi is half-pleased and half-unhappy.

Soon Chi-Ko finds out the true identity of Wing and is recruited by Madam Wong, to go undercover and reveal Gam-Chi and Chin-Long's suspected bookkeeping and underground firearms business.

== Cast ==
=== The Tung family ===
Cast	Role	Description
Elliot Ngok (岳華)	Tung Chin-Lung 童展龍	Nicolas Owner; Sung Gam-Chi's husband. Tung Chin-Pang's older brother. Tung Yat-Long, Tung Yat-Chiu and Tung Yat-Tsun's father Dies in Episode 25 from police gunfire (Villain)
Michelle Yim	Sung Gam-Chi 宋金枝	Tung Chin-Lung's wife. Tung Yat-Long and Tung Yat-Chiu's mother Sung Gam-Yuen's Older brother Goes insane in Episode 25 (Villain)
Stephen Wong	Tung Yat-Long (Vincent) 童日朗	Tung Chin-Lung and Sung Gam-Chi's eldest son. Tung Yat-Chiu's older brother. Tung Yat-Tsun's cousin; half-younger brother indeed Sung Ka-Yee's lover Half paralyzed in episode 12; Suicides in Episode 25
Vin Choi (蔡淇浚)	Tung Yat-Chiu (Edmond) 童日昭	Tung Chin-Lung and Sung Gam-Chi's youngest and trouble making son. Tung Yat-Long's younger brother. Tung Yat-Tsun's cousin; half-younger brother indeed Escapes from Hong Kong in episode 18; Arrested by police in Episode 25
Law Lok Lam (羅樂林)	Tung Chin-Pang 童展鵬	Tung Chin-Long's younger brother. Tung Yat-Tsun's non-biological father. (Tung Yat-Tsun was indeed the son of his wife and his elder brother); Dies in episode 17 from heart attack (indirectly killed by Tung Chin-Lung)
Ron Ng	Tung Yat-Tsun (Leo) 童日進	Tong Chi-Ko and Yan Heung-Ming's friend. Yan Heung-Ching's lover. Tung Chin-Lung's real son Tung Ching-Pang's non-biological son Tung Yat-Long and Tung Yat Chiu's cousin; half-elder brother in deed Stabbed and killed by Tung Chin-Lung in episode 25
Li Kwok Lun (李國麟)	Sung Gam-Yuen (Raymond) 宋金元	Sung Gam-Chi's younger brother. Sung Ka-Yee's father. Captured by police in episode 5 Was sentenced to 4 years in prison in episode 6 Dies from kidney failure in jail in episode 21 (Villain)
Shirley Yeung	Sung Ka-Yee (Kelly) 宋嘉兒	Tung Yat-Long's lover. Sung Gam-Yuen's daughter. Paralyzed in episode 25

=== The Tang family ===
Cast	Role	Description
Ha Yu	Tong Dai-Hoi 唐大海	Addicted Gambler; Tong Chi-Ko and Tong Chi-Man's father Committed suicide in episode 5
Mary Hon (韓馬利)	Ho Mei-Yin 何美妍	Tong Chi-Ko and Tong Chi-Man's mother.
Steven Ma	Tong Chi-Ko 唐志高	Lawyer/Legal Advisor; Tsui Wing's lover. Yan Heung-Ming and Tung Yat-Tsun's friend. Regains lawyer license in episode 25
Bernice Liu	Tsui Wing (Wing) 徐穎	Undercover Cop; Tong Chi-Ko's lover.
Yoyo Chen (陳自瑤)	Tong Chi-Man 唐芷敏	Tong Chi-Ko's younger sister.

=== The Yan family ===
Cast	Role	Description
Kenneth Ma	Yan Heung-Ming 殷向明	Police Officer; Yan Heung-Ching's older brother. Tong Chi-Ko and Tung Yat-Tsun's friend Stabbed by assassin hired by Sung Gam-Chi in episode 8
Kate Tsui	Yan Heung-Ching 殷向晴	Yan Heung-Ming's younger sister. Tung Yat-Tsun's lover. Pregnant

== Viewership ratings ==
	Week	Episode	Average Points	Peaking Points	References
1	January 8–12, 2007	1 — 5	27	30	
2	January 15–19, 2007	6 — 10	28	—	
3	January 22–26, 2007	11 — 15	30	31	
4	January 29 - February 2, 2007	16 — 20	30	32	
5	February 5–9, 2007	21 — 25	32	37	

== Awards and nominations ==
40th TVB Anniversary Awards (2007)

- "Best Drama"
- "Best Actress in a Leading Role" (Michelle Yim - Sung Gam-Chi)
- "Best Actress in a Leading Role" (Shirley Yeung - Kelly Sung Ka-Yee)
- "Best Actor in a Supporting Role" (Elliot Ngok - Tung Chin-Lung)
- "Best Actor in a Supporting Role" (Law Lok Lam - Tung Chin-Pang)
- "My Favourite Female Character Role" (Shirley Yeung - Kelly Sung Ka-Yee)
