= 7 Days in Life =

Hong Kong television series

- Promotional poster
- Also known as: 隔離七日情
- Genre: Comedy drama Action
- Written by: Ng Siu-tung
- Starring: Steven Ma; Sonija Kwok; Bosco Wong; Patrick Tang; Yuen Wah; Mimi Lo; Joyce Cheng; Koni Lui
- Theme music composer: Yip Siu-chung
- Opening theme: "Jun Faai Oi" (盡快愛) by Bosco Wong
- Country of origin: Hong Kong
- Original language: Cantonese
- No. of episodes: 20

Production
- Executive producer: Leung Choi-yuen
- Production location: Hong Kong
- Camera setup: Multi camera
- Running time: approx. 45 minutes (each)
- Production company: TVB

Original release
- Network: Jade
- Release: 24 January – 18 February 2011

7 Days in Life
- Traditional Chinese: 隔離七日情
- Simplified Chinese: 隔离七日情
- Literal meaning: "Romance of the seven-day quarantine"
Transcriptions
Standard Mandarin
- Hanyu Pinyin: Gélí Qīrì Qíng
Yue: Cantonese
- Jyutping: Gaak3 Lei4 Cat1 Jat6 Cing4

7 Days in Life (Traditional Chinese: 隔離七日情) is a Hong Kong television comedy drama produced by Television Broadcasts Limited (TVB). The drama's broadcast was on TVB's television channels Jade and HD Jade from 24 January to 18 February 2011, consisting of 20 episodes. The two final episodes were aired back to back on 18 February 2011.

7 Days in Life is produced by Leung Choi-yuen and stars Steven Ma, Sonija Kwok, Bosco Wong and Joyce Cheng. The drama is a fictional telling of a group of different people residing in a hotel during a true event that occurred in May 2009, when the first reported case of a person carrying the H1N1 virus in Hong Kong stayed in a hotel in Wanchai, resulting in the hotel to be sealed off for 7 days.

== Plot ==
Calvin and Christy, a pair of professional thieves, are quarantined in Wonderful Harbour Hotel for 7 days after the Hong Kong government discovers a guest at the hotel who is diagnosed with H1N1. The couple encounters a cop, a bellboy, a prostitute, a news reporter, a legendary thief, and several other rich and poor hotel guests and employees whom reluctantly bond together during their stay in the hotel.

== Cast and characters ==
- Steven Ma as Calvin Yik Cho-on (易早安), a professional thief who, along with his girlfriend Christy, robs the irresponsible rich and donates a portion of their stolen fortune to charity. During his quarantine in the Wonderful Harbour Hotel, Calvin disguises as a rich Thai Chinese businessman who is participating in a jewelry trade fair. Ma considers Calvin to be one of his first breakthrough roles in his acting career. Ma, who expressed many times in interviews that he wants to try out a villain role, explains that Calvin is "a jerk. He's horny, greedy, and even abducts children, but he's actually a very complex character. He has a painful secret that haunts him." Ma further said, "I can now finally challenge a character who is somewhat villainous." Leung remarked that Calvin is "so evil that he oozes juice" (a Cantonese phrase meaning "pure evil") but Ma argues that Calvin does have a softer side to him and that he's not completely heartless. The role requires Ma to consistently speak Thai, and he carries a dictionary to the film set every day.
- Sonija Kwok as Christy Wong Ka-yu (汪賈瑜), Calvin's girlfriend, also a professional thief. During her quarantine in the hotel, Christy disguises as the wife of a rich Shanghai businessman, and pretends to be constantly at odds with Calvin. Truthfully, she and Calvin are also a bickering pair. Calvin's ambitious and proud personality often clashes with Christy's more rational one. Kwok is passionate for the role and says Christy is a character that she always wanted to portray. Kwok filmed the drama's pre-production sales presentation trailer in late 2009, and is one of the original cast members who was not replaced.
- Bosco Wong as Chiu Chin-lung (趙展龍), an impulsive and overdetermined CID cop who is in the midst of investigating a kidnapping case. He tracks down the kidnapper into Wonderful Harbour Hotel and coincidentally gets isolated in the hotel with the others. Lung continues to investigate the case during the quarantine, encountering new friends and enemies.
- Joyce Cheng as Tong Ching (唐晶), an enthusiastic newspaper journalist who discovers the infamous rich businessman Franco To's affair with Mandy Fok, a bank superintendent, and follows them into Wonderful Harbour Hotel.
- Patrick Tang as Tai Siu-nam (戴少男), Wonderful Harbour Hotel's compassionate and timid bellboy. He is nicknamed Tai Siu (大少), meaning "eldest young master." Secretly working with a gang of kidnappers, Tai Siu hides the kidnapped boy in the hotel and tries to hide the boy from Lung.
- Yuen Wah as Ho Chan (何燦), Wonderful Harbour Hotel's helpful handyman. He is nicknamed Chief, which literally translates to "the lord of benevolence" (幫主). He is mysteriously skilled in many kinds of martial arts and is especially kind to Ching.
- Mimi Lo as Au-yeung Ka-ka (歐陽嘉嘉), an overage escort. She receives an outcall from the rich businessman Peter Tsui, who is temporarily staying at Wonderful Harbour Hotel, and coincidentally gets quarantined in the hotel as well.
- Océane Zhu as Yao Dan, A policewoman secretly disguised as a world-famous model.
- Koni Lui as Judy Liu Ho-yan (廖可人), Wonderful Harbour Hotel's receptionist who falls in love with Calvin.
- Eric Li as Man Jun-fai (文俊輝), Wonderful Harbour Hotel's manager.
- Coleman Tam as Fong Yat-long (方日朗), Keung's young son who gets kidnapped by Tai Siu's gang of kidnappers.
- Kwok Fung as Fong Kwok-keung (方國強), Wonderful Harbour Hotel's CEO.
- Yu Yang as Peter Tsui Fuk-sang (徐福生), a rich Malaysian businessmen.
- Joseph Lee as Man Bor (萬波), Tai Siu's cousin, boss and head of his gang of kidnappers.
- Angelina Lo as Kwok Wing-mui (郭詠梅), Lung's mother.
- Yvonne Lam as Christina Chin Ka-yin (錢家燕), Sang's wife.
- Mak Cheung-ching as Inspector Lau Cheuk-kei (劉卓奇), Lung's superordinate.
- Ching Ho-wai as Mrs. Fong Wan Yuen-han (方溫婉嫻)
- Shum Po-yee as Chu Yuk-fun (玉芬)
- Gill Mohindepaul Singh as Vikas Ali
- Brian Burrell as Ronald Copper, a suicidal airline pilot
- Katy Kung as Ho Siu-yan, a young pregnant woman.

== Production ==
Filming commenced in March 2010 and completed in May 2010.

=== Pre-production trailer ===
A pre-production sales presentation trailer was filmed in late 2009, which starred a star-studded cast. Bobby Au-yeung (an altered role is later replaced by Wong in the official production) was introduced as a bankrupt police officer who plans to commit suicide in the hotel. Yoyo Mung portrays his wife. Bowie Lam and Kristal Tin are portrayed as a falling out couple, in which the husband discovers his wife having an affair with his boss (Ram Chiang) at the hotel. Myolie Wu (replaced by Lo) portrays a high prostitute who develops a relationship with the hotel bellboy portrayed by Sammul Chan (replaced by Tang). Her client (portrayed by Mak) drops dead in the hotel room and the bellboy helps her dispose the body, only to find out later that the client only fainted. Only Kwok, who presented herself in the trailer as a professional thief, and Mak, are not replaced.

The trailer aired on TVB Jade and TVB HD Jade on 9 December 2009 with enthusiastic reviews.

== Reception ==
=== Broadcast ===
Over 2 million people watched the Hong Kong TVB Jade premiere, which aired on 24 January 2011, Monday night.

=== Critical reception ===
The critical response to 7 Days of Life was generally positive. Many Hong Kong netizens expressed the first episode to be "humorous and enjoyable." The scriptwriting to the drama was also well received, praising its fresh characters and fast-paced storyline.

== Awards and nominations ==
=== 45th TVB Anniversary Awards 2011 ===
- Nominated: Best Drama
- Nominated: Best Supporting Actor (Patrick Tang)
- Nominated: My Favourite Female Character (Sonija Kwok)
- Nominated: Most Improved Female Artiste (Katy Kung)

== Viewership ratings ==
The following is a table that includes a list of the total ratings points based on television viewership. "Viewers in millions" refers to the number of people, derived from TVB Jade average ratings (not including TVB HD Jade), in Hong Kong who watched the episode live. The peak number of viewers are in brackets.

| Week | Episode(s) | Average points | Peaking points | Viewers (in millions) | AI | References |
|---|---|---|---|---|---|---|
| 1 | 1 | 32 | 35 | 2.07 (2.27) | | |
| 1 | 2 – 5 | 30 | 36 | 1.91 (2.33) | | |
| 2 | 6 – 9 | 28 | 30 | 1.79 (1.91) | | |
| 3 | 10 – 14 | 30 | 34 | 1.92 (2.18) | | |
| 4 | 15 – 20 | 32 | 35 | 2.08(2.27) | | |
| 4 | 20 | 33 | 35 | 2.14(2.27) | | |
| Average | Esp 1 – Esp 20 | 30 | 36 | 1.92 (2.33) | | |
