= Safe Guards =

- 鐵血保鏢
- Genre: Costume Drama
- Starring: Steven Ma; Elaine Yiu; Wayne Lai
- Opening theme: 會友之鄉 by Steven Ma
- Country of origin: Hong Kong
- Original language: Cantonese
- No. of episodes: 25

Production
- Producer: Lee Tim-shing
- Running time: 45 minutes (approx.)

Original release
- Network: TVB
- Release: February 27 – March 31, 2006

Safe Guards (Traditional Chinese: 鐵血保鏢) is a TVB costume drama series broadcast in February 2006.

== Synopsis ==
The story revolves around the Wui Yau Safeguard Agency (會友鏢局), which is the most prominent safeguard and escort agency in Hangzhou. However, the agency was discovered to be close to bankruptcy, due to financial mismanagement. Together with his four sons, the patriarch of the family, Sheung Ching-Tong (Samuel Kwok) must, along with other allies and confidantes, rebuild the agency and save it from near certain death.

The series consists of 25 episodes and centers around the character - Sheung Chi who is the third son of Sheung Ching Tong.

The series starts off with Sheung Chi having to go to the help of his elder brother - Sheung Chung and their tumultuous relationship. This relationship was severely strained when Sheung Ching Tong had to decide on who will succeed him as the master of the agency.

Sheung Ching Tong's indecisiveness by first appointing Sheung Chung and then deciding against it and then to appoint Sheung Hao and then deciding against it too, resulted in a myriad of crisis in the agency which Sheung Chi had to face and manage. That Sheung Chi was the adopted son unlike Sheung Chung and Sheung Hao who are the natural sons of Sheung Ching Tong, made Sheung Chi's actions more questionable and difficult.

In the end, after much turmoil, Sheung Ching Tong appointed Sheung Chi as the master of the agency. Surprisingly, Sheung Chung supported the appointment but this is after having accepted that Sheung Chi will make a better leader than he would.

This took up almost 2/3 of the series and towards the end - episode 20/21, the character of Sheung Yi was introduced. Having spent his youth overseas, Sheung Yi came back when the father (Sheung Ching Tong) died. He then told Sheung Chi that with the modernisation i.e. building of railroads etc. the agency's method of delivering goods on land will be a thing of the past. Sheung Chi on hearing this decided to embark, together with his brothers Sheung Chung and Sheung Yi, on acquiring the rights to deliver goods via river. This formed the last part of the story.

The sub-plots in the series involved the relationship of Sheung Chi with Lei Cheung-Fung (Elaine Yiu) and how Sheung Hao (together with his mother and uncle) tried to destroy everything that Sheung Chi tried to achieve.

While the storyline is very light, it does have its dark and serious moments including the death of 3 main characters.

== Cast ==
Cast	Role	Description
Steven Ma	Sheung Chi 尚智	Wui Yau Safeguard Agency (會友鏢局) Fourth Master; Lei Cheung-Fung's lover. Sheung Ching-Tong's adopted son.
Elaine Yiu	Lei Cheung-Fung 利祥鳳	Wui Yau Safeguard Agency (會友鏢局) Guard; Sheung Chi's lover.
Wayne Lai	Sheung Chung 尚忠	Wui Yau Safeguard Agency (會友鏢局) Second Master; Sheung Ching-Tong's son.
Ben Wong	Sheung Hao 尚孝	Wui Yau Safeguard Agency (會友鏢局) Third Master; Sheung Ching-Tong's son.
Kwok Fung (郭峰)	Sheung Ching-Tong 尚正堂	Wui Yau Safeguard Agency (會友鏢局) First Master; Sheung Chung, Sheung Hao, and Shueng Yi's father. Sheung Chi's guardian. Sheung Ching-Pang and Sheung Ching-Man's brother.
Suet Nay	Chang Sau Ping 鄭秀萍	Sheung Ching-Tong's wife
Lai Lok-yi	Sheung Yi 尚義	Sheung Ching-Tong's son.
Lau Kong (劉江)	Sheung Ching-Pang 尚正鵬	Sheung Ching-Tong and Sheung Ching-Man's older brother.
Ram Chiang (蔣志光)	Sheung Ching-Man 尚正文	Yan Ching's husband. Sheung Ching-Pang and Sheung Ching-Tong's younger brother.
Kara Hui	Yan Ching 殷靜	Wui Yau Safeguard Agency (會友鏢局) Guard; Sheung Ching-Man's wife.
Evergreen Mak (麥長青)	Fo Yeung-Hung 火樣紅	

== Characters ==
- Sheung Ching-Tong (Samuel Kwok) is the patriarch of the Sheung family, he took over the Wui Yau Safeguard Agency (會友鏢局) from his father, and turned it into one of the most prominent safeguard agency in Hangzhou. However, when Ching-Tong attempted to buy a gentry official position with the Qing dynasty government, he discovered that Wui Yau is actually facing an acute financial crisis, due to deferred payments on loans issued by Wui Yau, and failure to receive payments for safeguard missions. This led to his decision to devolve duties to his three sons, in an effort to save the safeguard agency from certain demise.
- Sheung Ching-Pang (Lau Kong) is the elder brother of Ching-Tong, he always hoped to secure control of the safeguard agency, but this did not come to fruit. His bitterness on this issue was partly responsible for his negativeness on many issues, which culminated in a full-blown attempts to destabilize or dissolve Wui Yau. He was eventually expelled from the Sheung family after he was discovered to be an illegitimate child, whose biological father was an opera singer. He died in poverty, unwilling to accept his status as an illegitimate child.
- Sheung Ching-Man (Chiang Chi Kwong) is the younger brother of Ching-Tong, he is often considered by many to be the unproductive member of the family. He has never escorted goods, nor has he participated in the family business. However, his unwillingness to participate in the battle to control of the safeguard agency led Ching-Man to become Ching-Tong's private adviser and confidante during many crisis. It was only after the death of his wife, Yan Ching, that Ching-Man played a more active role in the agency.
- Yan Ching (Kara Hui) is the wife of Ching-Man, she is the martial arts instructor for the safeguard agency, as well as the agency's first female safeguard. She was killed in a bandit attack during a risky safeguard escort mission. She undertook the mission in order to secure funding for Sheung Chi's effort to acquire the rights to deliver goods via river.
- Sheung Chung (Wayne Lai) is the eldest biological son of Ching-Tong, his brutish demeanors and carelessness led many to write him off as a black sheep. However, his subsequent change in character and loyalty to the agency made him a central character in the efforts of Sheung Chi to acquire the rights to deliver goods via river.
- Sheung Hao (Ben Wong) is the second biological son of Ching-Tong. While he started off with great promise, his anger at not being chosen as the master of the agency led him to make mistakes after mistakes. His refusal to acknowledge his mistakes and his actions in trying to sabotage everything that is good for the agency made him an outcast and the ultimate bad guy in the series.
- Sheung Yi (Lai Lok-yi) is the third biological son of Ching-Tong, he was educated in the West, and had a bleak outlook for the safeguard industry. His foresight led Sheung Chi to embark on the effort to acquire the rights to deliver goods on river.
- Sheung Chi (Steven Ma) is the adopted third son of Ching-Tong, he helped out the family business, steering it through many crisis and tribulations. His work was recognized by Ching-Tong upon his death, who bequeathed the entire agency to him for continued operation.

== Viewership ratings ==
	Week	Episode	Average Points	Peaking Points	References
1	February 27 - March 3, 2006	1 — 5	29	—	
2	March 6–10, 2006	6 — 10	31	34	
3	March 13–17, 2006	11 — 15	31	—	
4	March 20–24, 2006	16 — 20	32	—	
5	March 27–31, 2006	21 — 25	34	40	

== Awards and nominations ==
=== Awards ===
39th TVB Anniversary Awards (2006)

- "My Favourite Male Character Role" (Steven Ma - Sheung Chi)

=== Nominations ===
39th TVB Anniversary Awards (2006)

- "Best Drama"
- "Best Actor in a Leading Role" (Steven Ma - Sheung Chi)
- "Best Actor in a Supporting Role" (Wayne Lai - Sheung Chung)
- "Best Actor in a Supporting Role" (Samuel Kwok - Sheung Ching-Tong)
- "Best Actor in a Supporting Role" (Lau Kong - Sheung Ching-Pang)
- "Best Actor in a Supporting Role" (Chiang Chi Kwong - Sheung Ching-Man)
- "My Favourite Male Character Role" (Steven Ma - Sheung Chi)
- "My Favourite Male Character Role" (Wayne Lai - Sheung Chung)
