= After School ICU =

Hong Kong children's television program

- 放學 ICU
- Genre: Children's television series, Educational
- Original language: Cantonese
- No. of episodes: 2614

Production
- Producer: Television Broadcasts Limited (TVB)
- Running time: 90 minutes (with commercials); 30 minutes (2014-2015)

Original release
- Network: TVB Jade
- Release: 3 January 2005 – 9 January 2015

After School ICU
- Traditional Chinese: 放學 ICU
- Simplified Chinese: 放学
Transcriptions
Standard Mandarin
- Hanyu Pinyin: Fàngxué ICU
Yue: Cantonese
- Jyutping: fong3 hok6 ICU

After School (Chinese: 放學 ICU) was a Hong Kong children's television programme produced by Television Broadcasts Limited (TVB). The programme aired on weekdays from 3 January 2005 to 9 January 2015. It was succeeded by Kids, Think Big.

The programme teaches a variety of activities, including sports and arts, and often advises children to have a healthy diet and lifestyle. The programme's main mascot has an Onion-shaped head, who supposedly crashlanded onto Earth.
