= Sweetness in the Salt =

Hong Kong television drama

- Official poster
- 碧血鹽梟
- Genre: Costume Drama
- Starring: Steven Ma; Tavia Yeung; Raymond Wong; Kwok Fung; Halina Tam; Ngo Ka-nin; Joel Chan
- Opening theme: "愛怎麼說" by Steven Ma & Tavia Yeung
- Country of origin: Hong Kong
- Original language: Cantonese
- No. of episodes: 25

Production
- Producer: Lee Tim-shing
- Running time: 45 minutes (approx.)

Original release
- Network: TVB
- Release: June 8 – July 10, 2009

Sweetness in the Salt
- Traditional Chinese: 碧血鹽梟
- Simplified Chinese: 碧血盐枭
Transcriptions
Standard Mandarin
- Hanyu Pinyin: Bì Xiě Yán Xiāo

Sweetness in the Salt (Traditional Chinese: 碧血鹽梟) is a TVB costume drama series released overseas in December 2008.

== Synopsis ==
Nip Chi Yuen (Ma Steven), who works in the anti-smuggling camp, is determined to wipe out the Tau's Fort, which is the stronghold for salt smugglers. He pretends to be a down-and-out scholar. Tau Sing Suet (Yeung Tavia), daughter of the chief smuggler, sympathizes with YUEN and puts him up in the village. Later, they even become fond of each other. During an anti-smuggling operation Suet is badly hurt and has since been separated from Yuen and her family. She is saved by Wu Ting Hin (Wong Raymond), son of salt merchant Wu Kin (Kwok Fung). Hin takes her home. One day, Suet is horrified to see the dead bodies of her parent being hung on the wall of the city tower, and that the official standing on the top of the tower telling the public not to sell smuggled salt is none other than the man she misses day and night. She is heartbroken, and her love for Yuen turns into hatred that moment on.

Hin finds a job for Suet at the salt company his family runs to help her get over her unhappiness. To repay him, she devotes herself entirely to the job. As time goes by, Hin starts to fall in love with her. However his critical illness makes him hesitate to express his love for her. Suet's real identity comes to light when her younger uncle reappears out of the blue. Hin, for fear that his family will report Suet, proposes to her.

== Cast ==
Cast	Role	Description
Steven Ma	Nip Ji-Yuen 聶致遠	Anti-Salt Smuggler Officer; Wu Family's Guard; Dau Sing-Suet's ex-lover.
Tavia Yeung	Dau Sing-Suet 竇勝雪	Daughter of a salt smuggler. Wu Ting-Hin's friend, later wife.

=== The Wu family ===
Cast	Role	Description
Kwok Fung (郭峰)	Wu Kin 胡坚	Salt Trader/Merchant
Halina Tam	Wu Ting-Bik 胡亭碧	Wu Kin's first child (daughter). Choi-Chi-On's secret lover.
Raymond Wong	Wu Ting-Hin 胡亭軒	Salt Merchant; Wu Kin's second child (son). Dau Sing-Suet's friend/admirer, later husband.
Ngo Ka-nin	Wu Ting-Fai 胡亭輝	Wu Kin's third child (son). Yin Yuet's lover and later father of her child and husband.
Casper Chan (陳思齊)	Wu Ting-Yim 胡亭嫣	Wu Kin's fourth child (daughter). Choi Chi On's friend then wife
Celine Ma (馬蹄露)	Wu Choi-Dip 胡彩蝶	Wu Kin's younger sister.

=== Other cast ===
Cast	Role	Description
Joel Chan (陳山聰)	Choi Chi-On 蔡子安	Salt trader/merchant Wu Ting-Bik's secret lover. Wu Ting-Yim's admirer, later husband.
Felix Lok	To Ying-Lung 屠應龍	Corrupted governor Nip Ji-Yuen's godfather.
Mary Hon (韓馬利)	Nip Cheung-See 聶張氏	Sauce merchant/Illegal loan lender Nip Ji-Yuen's mother
Chiang Chi Kwong (蔣志光)	Yiu Sau-Ching 姚守正	Non-corrupted governor
Lee Kwok Lun (李國麟)	Dau Hung 竇雄	Salt Smuggler; Dau Sing-Suet's uncle.
Meini Cheung (張美妮)	Yin Yuet 映月	Prostitute. Wu Ting-Fai's admirer.
Kara Hui	Choi Ngan Fa	Illegal salt smuggler

== Awards and nominations ==
TVB Anniversary Awards (2009)

- Nominated: Best Drama
- Nominated: Best Actor (Steven Ma) Top 5
- Nominated: Best Supporting Actor (Raymond Wong)

== Viewership ratings ==
	Week	Episodes	Average Points	Peaking Points	References
1	June 8–12, 2009	1—5	27	—	
2	June 15–19, 2009	6—10	27	31	
3	June 22–26, 2009	11 — 15	28	—	
4	June 2 - July 3, 2009	16—20	28	—	
5	July 6–10, 2009	21—25	30	33	
