= List of awards and nominations received by Hubert Wu =

Hubert Wu awards and nominations
Awards and nominations
Award	Wins	Nominations
IFPI Hong Kong Sales Awards	1	1
RTHK Top 10 Gold Songs Awards	2	11
Metro Showbiz Hit Awards	6	6
Metro Radio Mandarin Music Awards	1	1
Music Videos Awards Hong Kong	1	1
Jade Solid Gold Best 10 Awards Presentation	11	27
Jade Solid Gold Songs Selections	16	21
TVB Anniversary Awards	2	17
TVB Star Awards Malaysia	0	5
StarHub TVB Awards	1	5
RoadShow Cantonese Songs Chart Awards	2	2
Canadian Chinese Pop Chart Awards	4	4
Yahoo Asia Buzz Awards	3	3
TVB8 Mandarin Music On Demand Awards Presentation	1	1
"King of Music" Global Chinese Music Awards	3	3
Music Pioneer Chart	1	1
Yes! Idol Selection	1	1
Asian Television Awards	0	1

Totals (Note: Certain award groups do not simply award one winner. They acknowledge several different recipients, have runners-up, and have third place. Since this is a specific recognition and is different from losing an award, runner-up mentions are considered wins in this award tally. For simplification and to avoid errors, each award in this list has been presumed to have had a prior nomination.)
- Wins: 52
- Nominations: 109

Hubert Wu is a Cantopop Hong Kong singer-songwriter and actor. He debuted in 2010 after getting becoming the runner up of season 2 of The Voice (Hong Kong).

== Music awards ==
=== IFPI Hong Kong Sales Awards ===
Year	Award	Work	Result	Ref.
2013	Best Selling Male Newcomer	—N/a	Won	

=== RTHK Top 10 Gold Songs Awards ===
The RTHK Top 10 Gold Songs Awards Ceremony(zh:十大中文金曲頒獎音樂會) is held annually in Hong Kong since 1978. The awards are determined by Radio and Television Hong Kong based on the work of all Asian artistes (mostly cantopop) for the previous year.

Year	Award	Work	Result	Ref.
2013	Best New Artiste	—N/a	Gold Award	
2013	Top 10 Songs	Happiness	Nominated	
2014	Top 10 Songs	The Butterfly Lovers	Nominated	
2014	Top 10 Artistes	—N/a	Nominated	
2016	Top 10 Artistes	—N/a	Nominated	
2016	Top 10 Songs	A Better Tomorrow	Nominated	
2017	Top 10 Songs	Knowing	Nominated	
2017	Top 10 Artistes	—N/a	Nominated	
2017	Top 10 Songs	Friend Zone	Nominated	
2017	Top 10 Songs	Imperfect Me	Nominated	

=== Metro Showbiz Hit Awards ===
The Metro Showbiz Hit Awards (新城勁爆頒獎禮) is held in Hong Kong annually by Metro Showbiz radio station. It focus mostly in cantopop music.

Year	Award	Work	Result	Ref.
2012	Best New Male Artiste	—N/a	Won	
2013	Metro Hit Songs	The Butterfly Lovers	Won	
2013	Best Collaboration	Crush	Won	
2014	Metro Original Songs	Out of My League	Won	
2015	Metro Hit Songs	Knowing	Won	
2016	Metro Top 12 Singers	—N/a	Won	

=== Metro Radio Mandarin Music Awards ===
Metro Radio Mandarin Music Awards (新城國語力頒獎禮) is held in Hong Kong annually by Metro Showbiz radio station. It focus mostly in Mandopop music, it was first awarded in 2002 and ended in 2015.

Year	Award	Work	Result	Ref.
2013	Metro Mandarin Best New Artiste	—N/a	Won	

=== Music Videos Awards Hong Kong ===
It is organized by IFPI (Hong Kong) in 2015.

Year	Award	Work	Result	Ref.
2015	Hot Music Videos	Knowing	Bronze Award	

=== Jade Solid Gold Best 10 Awards Presentation ===
Year	Award	Work	Result	Ref.
2013	Best Adapted Song	Happiness	Nominated	
2013	Outstanding Performance	—N/a	Nominated	
2013	Popular Male New Artiste	—N/a	Gold Award	
2013	Asian Pacific Most Popular Male Artiste	—N/a	Nominated	
2013	Most Popular Male Artiste	—N/a	Nominated	
2014	Best 20 Songs	The Butterfly Lovers	Won	
2014	Best 20 Songs	Enlightenment	Won	
2014	Best 20 Songs	Crush	Nominated	
2014	Best Soundtrack	Enlightenment	Nominated	
2014	Best Soundtrack	The Butterfly Lovers	Nominated	
2014	Most Popular Male Artiste	—N/a	Nominated	
2015	Most Popular Male Artiste	—N/a	Nominated	
2015	Best 20 Songs	Tight Game	Won	
2016	Best 20 Songs	The Truth	Won	
2016	Best 20 Songs	A Better Tomorrow	Nominated	
2016	Best 20 Songs	Knowing	Won	
2016	Best Adapted Song	Knowing	Won	
2016	Most Popular Male Artiste	—N/a	Nominated	
2017	Best 20 Songs	Intolerance	Won	
2017	Best 20 Songs	Unexpected Fate	Nominated	
2017	Best 20 Songs	Let Me Let Go	Nominated	
2017	Best 20 Songs	Like Awakening	Nominated	
2017	Most Popular Male Artiste	—N/a	Nominated	
2017	Jade Solid Gold Best Songs	I Was Here	Won	
2017	Jade Solid Gold Best Songs	Friend Zone	Won	
2017	Best Male Artiste	—N/a	Won	
2017	Most Popular Artiste	—N/a	Nominated	

=== Jade Solid Gold Songs Selections ===
Year	Award	Work	Result	Ref.
2011	Best Newcomer	—N/a	Won	
2011	Second Round	Floating Flower	Won	
2012	Second Round	Couple Getaway	Won	
2012	Third Round	Happiness	Won	
2014	Second Round	Tight Game	Won	
2015	First Round	The Truth	Won	
2015	First Round	Out of My League	Won	
2015	Second Round	Knowing	Won	
2015	Second Round	A Better Tomorrow	Nominated	
2015	Second Round	Be A Star Tonight	Nominated	
2016	First Round	Like Awakening	Won	
2016	First Round	Let Me Let Go	Won	
2016	Second Round	Intolerance	Won	
2016	Second Round	Unexpected Fate	Nominated	
2017	First Round	Imperfect Me	Won	
2017	Second Round	Friend Zone	Won	
2017	Second Round	I Was Here	Won	
2018	First Round	Secret Love Song	Won	
2018	First Round	Most Unforgettable Day	Nominated	
2018	First Round	The Day After Today	Nominated	
2018	First Round	Far Away	Won	

=== TVB Anniversary Awards ===
Year	Award	Work	Result	Ref.
2014	Most Popular Soundtrack	Out of My League	Nominated	
2014	Most Popular Soundtrack	Tight Game	Nominated	
2014	Most Popular Soundtrack	Compete in Speed	Nominated	
2015	Most Popular Soundtrack	The Truth	Nominated	
2016	Most Popular Soundtrack	A Better Tomorrow	Nominated	
2016	Most Popular Soundtrack	Agony	Nominated	
2016	Most Popular Soundtrack	Intolerance	Nominated	
2016	Most Popular Soundtrack	Unexpected Fate	Nominated	
2016	Most Popular Soundtrack	Daddy	Nominated	
2016	Most Popular Soundtrack	Choice of Justice	Nominated	
2016	Most Popular Soundtrack	King	Nominated	
2017	Most Popular Soundtrack	I Was Here	Won	
2017	Most Popular Soundtrack	Far Away	Nominated	
2020	Most Popular Soundtrack	Crossroads	Nominated	
2020	Most Popular Soundtrack	Mortals Don’t Know Love	Won	
2021	Most Popular Soundtrack	Adversity	Nominated	
2021	Most Popular Soundtrack	Wish You Well	Nominated	
2022	Most Popular Soundtrack	Never Knew	Nominated	

=== TVB Star Awards Malaysia ===
Year	Award	Work	Result	Ref.
2012	Favourite Soundtrack	Yat Sang Yat Sam	Nominated	
2013	Favourite Soundtrack	Enlightenment	Nominated	
2015	Favourite Soundtrack	The Truth	Nominated	
2016	Favourite Soundtrack	Intolerance	Nominated	

=== StarHub TVB Awards ===
Year	Award	Work	Result	Ref.
2015	My Favourite Soundtrack	The Truth	Won	
2016	My Favourite Soundtrack	Intolerance	Nominated	
2016	My Favourite Soundtrack	Daddy	Nominated	
2016	My Favourite Soundtrack	Unexpected Fate	Nominated	
2017	My Favourite Soundtrack	King	Nominated	

=== RoadShow Cantonese Songs Chart Awards ===
Year	Award	Work	Result	Ref.
2017	Hit Songs	Imperfect Me	Won	
2017	Best MV	Imperfect Me	Won	

=== Canadian Chinese Pop Chart Awards ===
Year	Award	Work	Result	Ref.
2013	Best Male Newcomer	—N/a	Won	
2013	Top 10 Songs	Happiness	Won	
2014	Top 10 Songs	The Butterfly Lovers	Won	
2017	Top 10 Cantonese Songs	Knowing	Won	

=== Yahoo Asia Buzz Awards ===
Year	Award	Work	Result	Ref.
2012	Best Newcomer	—N/a	Won	
2013	Best Soundtrack	The Butterfly Lovers	Won	
2017	Popular MVs	I Was Here	Won	

=== TVB8 Mandarin Music On Demand Awards Presentation ===
Year	Award	Work	Result	Ref.
2012	Best Newcomer	—N/a	Gold Award	

=== "King of Music" Global Chinese Music Awards ===
Year	Award	Work	Result	Ref.
2015	Best Original Song	Out of My League	Won	
2016	Top 10 Cantonese Songs	Knowing	Won	
2016	Artiste on the Rise	—N/a	Won	

=== Music Pioneer Chart ===
Year	Award	Work	Result	Ref.
2012	Best New Artiste (HK)	—N/a	Won	

=== Yes! Idol Selection ===
Year	Award	Work	Result	Ref.
2012	Hot New Artiste	—N/a	Won	

=== People's Choice Television Awards ===
Year	Award	Work	Result	Ref.
2017	People’s Choice Best Theme Song	I Was Here	Top 5 (Ranked 2nd)	
2017	People’s Choice Best Theme Song	Far Away	Won	
2021	People’s Choice Best Theme Song	Wish You Well	Nominated	

=== Hong Kong Television Awards ===
Year	Award	Work	Result	Ref.
2017	Best Theme Song	I Was Here	Won	

== Other awards ==
=== TVB Anniversary Awards ===
Year	Award	Work	Result	Ref.
2016	Most Improved Male Artiste	Blue Veins	Nominated	
2017	Most Improved Male Artiste	The Exorcist's Meter and My Ages Apart	Nominated	
2017	Best Supporting Actor	The Exorcist's Meter — Shek Kam Dong	Nominated	
2017	Most Popular Male TV Character	The Exorcist's Meter — Shek Kam Dong	Nominated	
2017	Most Popular Onscreen Partnership	The Exorcist's Meter (shared with Kenneth Ma)	Nominated	
2020	Most Popular Onscreen Partnership	The Exorcist’s 2nd Meter (shared with Kenneth Ma)	Nominated	
2020	Most Popular Male TV Character	The Exorcist’s 2nd Meter — Mok Wai-ho	Nominated (Top 5)	
2020	Best Actor	The Exorcist’s 2nd Meter — Mok Wai-ho	Nominated	
2020	Favourite TVB Actor in Malaysia	The Exorcist’s 2nd Meter — Mok Wai-ho	Nominated	
2021	Favourite TVB Actor in Malaysia	A Love of No Words — Man Chor	Nominated	
2021	Best Actor	A Love of No Words — Man Chor	Nominated (Top 10)	
2021	Most Popular Male TV Character	A Love of No Words — Man Chor	Nominated (Top 5)	
2021	Most Improved Male Artiste	A Love of No Words — Man Chor	Nominated (Top 6)	
2021	Most Popular Onscreen Partnership	A Love of No Words (shared with Regina Ho and Joey Law)	Nominated	
2022	Best Actor	Hello Misfortune — Chan Bak-ho	Nominated	
2022	Most Popular Male TV Character	Hello Misfortune — Chan Bak-ho	Nominated	
2022	Favourite TVB Actor in Malaysia	Hello Misfortune — Chan Bak-ho	Nominated	
2022	Most Popular Onscreen Partnership	Hello Misfortune (shared with Erica Chan)	Nominated	

=== TVB Star Awards Malaysia ===
Year	Award	Work	Result	Ref.
2016	Best Host	Toy Red Star Nuisance Summer- 嘩鬼上學去	Nominated	

=== Asian Television Awards ===
Year	Award	Work	Result	Ref.
2018	Best Actor in a Supporting Role	The Exorcist's Meter — Shek Kam Dong	Nominated	

=== People's Choice Television Awards ===
Year	Award	Work	Result	Ref.
2017	People’s Choice Best Supporting Actor	The Exorcist's Meter — Shek Kam Dong	Won	
2017	People’s Choice Most Improved Male Artiste	The Exorcist's Meter — Shek Kam Dong and My Ages Apart — Poon Wing-hang	Won	
2017	People’s Choice Best TV Drama Partnership	The Exorcist's Meter — Shek Kam Dong (shared with Kenneth Ma as Ma Kwai)	Won	
2018	People’s Choice Best Actor	Wife, Interrupted — Lee Yan-long	Top 5 (Ranked 5th)	
2018	People’s Choice Best Supporting Actor	Stealing Seconds — Law Sui-nam	Top 5 (Ranked 5th)	
2018	People’s Choice Most Improved Male Artiste	Stealing Seconds — Law Sui-nam and Wife, Interrupted — Lee Yan-long	Top 5 (Ranked 4th)	
2021	People’s Choice Best Actor	A Love of No Words — Man Chor	Top 10 (Ranked 8th)	
2021	People’s Choice Most Improved Male Artiste	A Love of No Words — Man Chor	Top 10 (Ranked 9th)	
2021	People’s Choice Best TV Drama Partnership	A Love of No Words — Man Chor (shared with Regina Ho as Chuk Kwan-ho and Joey Law as Szeto Lai-shun)	Nominated	

=== Hong Kong Television Awards ===
Year	Award	Work	Result
2017	Best Leading Actor in Drama Series	The Exorcist's Meter — Shek Kam Dong	Top 5 (Ranked 4th)
