= Hubert Wu discography =

- Studio albums: 5
- Singles: 36

The discography of Hubert Wu, a Hong Kong singer-songwriter, consists of five studio albums and thirty six singles.

== Studio albums ==
#	Album Info	Track listing
1st	Couple Getaway: Released： 14 September 2012 6 February 2013 (Dual Edition Live +); Label: Stars Shine International	CD: 1. 原諒 Forgive Me; 2. 雙飛 Couple Getaway; 3. 失控 Out of Control; 4. 真心喜歡你 所以流眼淚 I Cried For You; 5. 言不由衷 Hide From Me; 6. 一生一心 Yat San Yat Sam; 7. 幸福 Happiness; 8. 深不見底 I Didn't Know You Well; 9. 我們繼續演下去 Show Must Go On; 10. 雙飛（國）Couple Getaway (Mandarin); DVD: 1. 雙飛 Couple Getaway MV; 2. 原諒 Forgive Me MV; Dual Edition (Live +): 1. 原諒 Forgive Me; 2. 言不由衷 Hide From Me; 3. 我們繼續演下去 Show Must Go On; 4. 失控 Out of Control; 5. 一生一心 Yat San Yat Sam; 6. 有故事的人 The Storyman (ft.Joyce Cheng); 7. 雙飛 Couple Getaway; 8. 深不見底 I Didn't Know You Well; 9. 真心喜歡你 所以流眼淚 I Cried For You; 10. 幸福 Happiness
2nd	The Butterfly Lovers: Released：2 October 2013; Label: Stars Shine International	CD: 1. 化蝶 The Butterfly Lovers; 2. 勇氣 Thank You; 3. 暗戀 Crush (ft.Jinny Ng); 4. 明白了 Enlightenment; 5. 然後 After That; 6. 明日 Tomorrow; 7. 交替之間 Time Is Everything (ft. Linda Chung); 8. 啞忍 Silence Is Gold; 9. 救救我 Rescue Me (ft.Jinny Ng); DVD: 1. 化蝶 The Butterfly Lovers MV; 2. 暗戀 Crush MV
3rd	Knowing: Released：2 December 2015; Label: Voice Entertainment	CD: 1. 明知故犯 Knowing; 2. 相信明天 A Better Tomorrow; 3. 如夢初醒 Awakening; 4. 讓我放開 Let Me Let Go; 5. 心淡 Disheartened; 6. 真相 The Truth (ft.Alfred Hui); 7. 靈魂的痛 Agony; 8. 高攀 Out of My League; 9. 無力下去 Powerless; 10. 明知道 (國) Knowing (Mandarin)
4th	I Was Here: Released：19 December 2017; Label: Voice Entertainment	CD: 1. 到此一遊 I Was There; 2. 遙不可及 Far Away; 3. 朋友身份 Friend Zone; 4. 天地不容 Intolerance; 5. 情人自擾 Imperfect Me; 6. 今日之後 The Day After Today; 7. 二缺一 Without You (ft.Stephanie Ho); 8. 公義的抉擇 Choice of Justice; 9. 爸爸 Daddy; 10. 命運的意外 Unexpected Fate
5th	Are You Feeling Blissful: Released：23 September 2020; Label: Voice Entertainment	CD: 1. 十字路口 Crossroads; 2. 凡人不懂愛 Mortals Don't Know About Love; 3. 沒身份妒忌 Unqualified; 4. 一刀切 Clean Cut; 5. 妳幸福嗎 Are You Feeling Blissful; 6. 太難開始 Missed; 7. 偷聽情歌 Secret Love Song; 8. 偉業街 Wai Yip Street; 9. 為愛冒險 Taking Chances; 10. 理性感性 Rationality and Sensibility

== Singles ==
=== As a lead singer ===
Year	Single	Peak positions							Album
Year	Single	RTHK Chinese Pop Chart	CRHK Ultimate 903	Metro Radio Pop Chart 997	JSG Billboard (TVB)	DBC Chart	hmv PLAY	Canadian Chinese Hit Songs	Album
2011	Floating Flowers	-	-	-	4	-	-	-	Soundtrack of All Men Are Brothers
2012	Yat San Yat Sam	-	-	3	-	-	-	-	Couple Getaway
2012	Couple Getaway	2	7	3	1	-	-	-	Couple Getaway
2012	Happiness	3	3	-	2	-	-	-	Couple Getaway
2012	Out of Control	-	-	-	-	-	-	-	Couple Getaway
2012	Tomorrow	16	-	-	-	-	-	-	The Butterfly Lovers
2013	Crush	-	-	3	2	-	-	-	The Butterfly Lovers
2013	The Butterfly Lovers	-	1	2	1	-	-	-	The Butterfly Lovers
2013	Enlightenment	-	12	4	6	-	-	-	The Butterfly Lovers
2014	Tight Game	-	-	-	5	-	-	-	TV Love Songs Forever
2014	Out of My League	-	-	4	-	-	-	-	Knowing
2015	The Truth	/	/	/	3	-	-	-	TV Love Songs Forever
2015	A Better Tomorrow	-	1	2	1	-	-	-	Knowing
2015	Be A Star Tonight	-	-	-	1	-	-	-	2015 Miss Hong Kong Pageant Theme Song
2015	Knowing	-	1	3	1	4	-	-	Knowing
2016	Awakening	-	-	2	-	-	-	-	Knowing
2016	Let Me Let Go	-	-	-	1	-	-	-	Knowing
2016	Intolerance	-	-	2	1	-	-	-	My TV Love Songs; I Was Here
2016	Unexpected Fate	-	-	-	1	-	-	-	I Was Here
2017	Imperfect Me	19	3	3	1	-	1	-	I Was Here
2017	Friend Zone	13	3	2	1	-	-	-	I Was Here
2017	I Was Here	3	-	1	1	-	-	5	I Was Here
2017	Far Away	/	3	/	(1)	-	-	10	I Was Here
2018	The Day After Today	-	-	-	1	-	-	-	I Was Here
2018	Most Unforgettable Day	-	-	-	-	-	-	-	Theme Song of Stealing Seconds
2018	Secret Love Song	3	-	4	1	-	-	-	Are You Feeling Blissful
2018	Wai Yip Street	19	20	3	6	-	-	-	Are You Feeling Blissful
2018	Rationality and Sensibility	-	-	-	-	-	-	-	Are You Feeling Blissful
2018	Taking Chances	-	-	-	-	-	-	-	Are You Feeling Blissful
2018	Missed	-	-	-	1	-	-	-	Are You Feeling Blissful
2019	Sweet Days	-	-	-	-	-	-	-	Theme Song of My Commissioned Lover
2020
2020	Unqualified	-	-	-	1	-	-	-	Are You Feeling Blissful
2020	Crossroads	-	-	-	-	-	-	-	Are You Feeling Blissful
2020	Mortals Don't Know About Love	-	-	-	1	-	-	-	Are You Feeling Blissful
2020	Are You Feeling Blissful	-	-	-	1	-	-	-	Are You Feeling Blissful
2021	Reborn	-	-	-	-	-	-	-	
"—" denotes releases that did not chart. "/" denotes releases were not sent to those music stations

Total No.1 Hits
903	RTHK	997	TVB	Note
0	3	1	15	The Total Number of Four No.1 Hit songs：0

=== As a featuring artist ===
Year	Single	Peak positions							Album
Year	Single	RTHK Chinese Pop Chart	CRHK Ultimate 903	Metro Radio Pop Chart 997	JSG Billboard (TVB)	DBC Chart	hmv PLAY	Canadian Chinese Hit Songs	Album
2011	Soaring	-	-	-	5	-	-	-	Theme Song of The Voice 3
2012	Let's Go Celebrate	-	-	-	-	-	-	-	Supervoice (Lunar New Year Edition)
2013	喜氣洋洋 Be Happy	19	11	-	-	-	-	-	Non-album single
2013	We Dream	/	/	/	2	-	-	-	Theme Song of The Voice of Stars
2014	We Are The Only One	-	-	-	1	-	-	-	Theme Song of 2014 Brazil FIFA World Cup (TVB Edition)
2016	Cai Shen Dao	-	-	-	2	-	-	-	Non-album single
2016	Go With The Wind	-	-	-	2	-	-	-	Non-album single
