= Knowing =

Knowing or The Knowing may refer to:

== Philosophy and theology ==
- Knowledge
- Gnosis, knowledge in Gnostic belief

== Music ==
- Knowing (album), by Hubert Wu, 2015
- The Knowing, an album by Novembers Doom, 2000
- Knowing, an album by Jeff Chang, 1992
- "Knowing", a song by OutKast from Speakerboxxx/The Love Below, 2003
- "The Knowing", a song by The Weeknd from House of Balloons, 2011

== Other uses ==
- Knowing (film), a 2009 science fiction film
- Knowing, a 1988 fragrance by Estée Lauder Companies

== See also ==
- Knowing Me, Knowing You (disambiguation)
- Knowings, a surname
