= I Was Here =

I Was Here may refer to:

== Music ==
- I Was Here (album), by Hubert Wu, or the title song, 2017
- "I Was Here" (song), by Beyoncé, 2011
- "I Was Here", a song by Lady Antebellum from the AT&T Team USA Soundtrack, 2008
- "I Was Here", a song by Lisa Loeb from Feel What U Feel, 2016
- "I Was Here", a song by Tina Arena from Quand tout Recommence, 2018
- "I Was Here", a song from the musical The Glorious Ones, 2007

== Other uses ==
- I Was Here (film), a 2008 Estonian film
- "I Was Here" (Chicago P.D.), a 2020 television episode
- I Was Here, a 2015 novel by Gayle Forman
