= The Exorcist's Meter =

2017 Hong Kong TV series

- 降魔的
- Genre: Supernatural
- Created by: Dave Fong Chun-chiu
- Written by: Ruby Law Pui-ching
- Starring: Kenneth Ma; Mandy Wong; Hubert Wu; Moon Lau; Hugo Wong; Ram Chiang; Susan Tse
- Theme music composer: Alan Cheung Ka-shing; Damon Chui
- Opening theme: I Was Here (到此一遊) by Hubert Wu
- Ending theme: Far Away (遙不可及) by Hubert Wu; Bleeding Rose (泣血薔薇) by Jinny Ng
- Country of origin: Hong Kong
- Original languages: Cantonese; Mandarin
- No. of episodes: 21

Production
- Producer: Dave Fong Chun-chiu
- Production location: Hong Kong
- Camera setup: Multi camera
- Running time: 45 minutes (per episode)
- Production company: TVB

Original release
- Network: TVB Jade
- Release: 30 October – 26 November 2017

Related
- The Exorcist’s 2nd Meter

The Exorcist's Meter is a 2017 Hong Kong supernatural television drama produced by Television Broadcasts Limited (TVB). It stars Kenneth Ma, Mandy Wong, Hubert Wu, Moon Lau, Hugo Wong, Ram Chiang and Susan Tse. A second season was aired in 2020.

== Synopsis ==
Ma Kwai (Kenneth Ma) is an optimistic taxi driver. One day, he accidentally wakes the stone spirit Shek Kam Dong (Hubert Wu). Since then, he is able to see ghosts and spirits. Meanwhile, Ma meets Bella Bui (Moon Lau), a supernatural TV host, and together they go on supernatural adventures. Bella gradually develops feelings for Ma. Nevertheless, Ma has had a crush on his regular passenger, Dr. Felicity Chong (Mandy Wong). In the meantime, a demon endangers the world. Shek Kam Dong loses his powers while battling with it. Surprisingly, Ma shows powers which enables him to fight the demon...

== Production ==
A costume fitting press conference was held on 25 August 2016. The filming lasted from August to December 2016.

== Cast and characters ==
=== Main cast ===
- Kenneth Ma as Ma Kwai (馬季), better known as Siu Ma (小馬), a night shift taxi driver. His biological parents had died when he was a child. He was adopted by Leung Ching-ching, the mother of his deceased friend at the age of eight. Although he has encountered countless accidents, he has managed to survive through them all. He has a crush on his regular passenger, Dr. Felicity Chong, but doesn't have the courage to confess due to their differences in occupation and social status. One day, he accidentally wakes the stone spirit, Shek Kam Dong. Since then, he has gained the ability to see ghosts.
- Mandy Wong as Dr. Felicity Chong Tsz-yeuk (莊芷若), an elegant and kind-hearted Emergency Room doctor and one of Siu Ma's regular passengers. She is unable to let go of her late fiancé and keeps her feelings to herself, but finds comfort in sharing her troubles with Siu Ma, who gradually develops a trustworthy relationship with her.
  - Wong also portrays Salvia, a demon who takes the form of Felicity.
- Hubert Wu as Shek Kam Dong (石敢當), a 3000-year-old stone spirit who was accidentally awoken from his 300-year slumber by Siu Ma. He is righteous and takes his job as an exorcist seriously, He later becomes a close friend to Siu Ma and his family.
- Moon Lau as Bella Pui Pui-na (貝貝娜), better known as Bear Bear (啤啤), a reluctant host to a supernatural variety show who wants to be an anchor and another regular passenger of Siu Ma. Although she hosts a supernatural show, she is ironically afraid of ghosts. She comes to understand them as she joins Siu Ma in his exorcism antics. She later develops feelings for Siu Ma.
- Hugo Wong as Kwok Chin-ming (郭展明), a police officer with a dark past. When he was a child, he was often abused by his father, but he developed feelings for Felicity, who stood up for him as kids. Jealous of her relationship with Siu Ma, he forms a contract with Salvia, who grants him powers behind human comprehension.
- Ram Chiang as Mok Yau-wai (莫有為), Leung Ching-ching's brother and an amateur scientist. He deeply cares for her and Siu Ma.
- Susan Tse as Leung Ching-ching (梁晶晶), a superstitious massagist and Siu Ma's foster mother.

=== Supporting cast ===
- Willie Wai as Chan Wing-lim (陳永廉), better known as Do Do Sir (嘟嘟Sir), a Senior Superintendent of Police of the District Crime Squad. He originally suspected his wife was cheating on him, but later discovers her job as a cosplayer with Siu Ma’s help, later supporting her. As a result of helping him, he assists Siu Ma with his supernatural antics.
- Raymond Chiu as Luk Ka-yat (陸嘉一), better known as Seven (些粉), a night shift taxi driver and Siu Ma's good friend. His nickname is a direct pun to his Chinese name, which literally means "six plus one".
- Lau Kong as Kwok Wing-sing (郭永城), Chin Ming’s father who used to abuse him when he was a child and is paralysed.
- King Kong Lee as Ma Ka-lit (馬家烈), better known as Lik Gor (力哥), Siu Ma's birth father. He owned a noodle shop.
- Kitty Yuen as Kwai Li-fu (季莉芙), better known as Lik So (力嫂), Lik Gor's wife and Siu Ma's birth mother.
- Iris Lam as Cheung Pui-ling (張佩玲), She is the sister of Chin-ming‘s deceased partner and has a crush on Kwok Chin-ming.
- Kayee Tam as Lily (莉莉), a doll spirit from the doll owned by Bear Bear.
- Anthony Ho as Lung Mou (龍荗), better known as Lung Mao (龍貓), a night shift taxi driver and Siu Ma's friend.

=== Guest appearance ===
- Helena Law as Lung Por (龍婆), Siu Ma’s taxi passenger and a psychic. (Episode 1)
- Mandy Lam as Ivy Yip Pui-mei (葉佩薇), a producer from the news department. (Episode 7-8 and 15)
- Tony Hung as a ghost and Bella Pui’s fan.

== Awards and nominations ==
=== TVB Anniversary Awards 2017 ===
Category	Nominee	Result
Best Drama	The Exorcist’s Meter	Nominated
Netizen’s Favourite Drama	The Exorcist’s Meter	Won
Best Actor	Kenneth Ma	Top 5
Most Popular Male Character	Kenneth Ma as "Ma Kwai"	Won
Most Popular Male Character	Hubert Wu as "Shek Kam Dong"	Nominated
Most Popular Female Character	Mandy Wong as "Chong Tsz-yeuk"	Top 5
Most Popular Female Character	Moon Lau as "Pui Pui-na"	Nominated
Most Popular Female Character	Susan Tse as "Leung Ching-ching"	Nominated
Best Supporting Actor	Hubert Wu	Nominated
Best Supporting Actor	Hugo Wong	Nominated
Best Supporting Actor	Ram Chiang	Nominated
Best Supporting Actor	Anthony Ho	Nominated
Best Supporting Actress	Susan Tse	Nominated
Most Improved Male Artiste	Hubert Wu	Nominated
Most Popular Onscreen Partnership	Kenneth Ma and Hubert Wu	Nominated
Most Popular Drama Theme Song	I Was Here by Hubert Wu	Won
Most Popular Drama Theme Song	Far Away by Hubert Wu	Nominated
Most Popular Drama Theme Song	Bleeding Rose by Jinny Ng	Nominated

=== People's Choice Television Awards 2017 ===
Category	Nominee	Result
Best Drama	The Exorcist’s Meter	Won
Best Script	The Exorcist’s Meter	Won
People’s Choice Best Actor	Kenneth Ma as "Ma Kwai"	Won
People’s Choice Best Actress	Mandy Wong as "Chong Tsz-yeuk"	Top 5 (Ranked 2nd)
People’s Choice Best Supporting Actor	Hubert Wu as "Shek Kam Dong"	Won
People’s Choice Best Supporting Actor	Anthony Ho as "Lung Mau"	Top 5 (Ranked 2nd)
People’s Choice Best Supporting Actor	Raymond Chiu as "Luk La-yat"	Top 5 (Ranked 3rd)
People’s Choice Best Supporting Actress	Moon Lau as "Pui Pui-na"	Top 5 (Ranked 2nd)
People’s Choice Most Improved Male Artiste	Hubert Wu	Won
People’s Choice Most Improved Male Artiste	Anthony Ho	Top 5 (Ranked 2nd)
People’s Choice Most Improved Female Artiste	Moon Lau	Won
People’s Choice Best TV Drama Partnership	Kenneth Ma and Hubert Wu as "Ma Kwai" and "Shek Kam Dong"	Won
People’s Choice Best TV Drama Partnership	Kenneth Ma, King Kong Lee and Kitty Yuen as "Ma Kwai", "Ma Ka-lit" and "Kwai Li-fu"	Top 5 (Ranked 5th)
People’s Choice Best Drama Theme Song	I Was Here by Hubert Wu	Top 5 (Ranked 2nd)
People’s Choice Best Drama Theme Song	Far Away by Hubert Wu	Won
People’s Choice Best Drama Theme Song	Bleeding Rose by Jinny Ng	Top 5 (Ranked 5th)

=== 2017 Hong Kong Television Awards ===
Category	Nominee	Result
Best Drama	The Exorcist’s Meter	Won
Best Production, Best Script	The Exorcist’s Meter	Won
Best Leading Actor in Drama Series	Kenneth Ma as "Ma Kwai"	Won
Best Supporting Actor in Drama Series	Anthony Ho as "Lung Mau"	Won
Best Supporting Actress in Drama Series	Moon Lau as "Pui Pui-na"	Won
Best Theme Song	I Was Here by Hubert Wu	Won
