= Ghost Dragon of Cold Mountain =

Hong Kong television series

- Promo poster
- Also known as: Cold Mountain, Hidden Dragon
- 寒山潛龍
- Genre: Period drama
- Created by: Hong Kong Television Broadcasts Limited
- Written by: Ho Wing Nin; Lai Ka Ming; Cheung Chung Si; Ng Pui Yee; Law Wan Fong
- Directed by: Ng Kwan Yu; Leung Yiu Kin; Yin Zhi Wai; Kwok Kar Hei; Lai Pak Kin
- Starring: Kenneth Ma; Rosina Lam; Pierre Ngo; Power Chan; Raymond Cho; Selena Lee; Lau Kong
- Theme music composer: Joseph Wei
- Opening theme: "Way Back" by Fred Cheng
- Ending theme: "Way Back" by Fred Cheng (Episodes 1-6, 8-13, 17, 19, 21-22, 27-29); Various Instrumental Music (Episode 7, 14, 25) "Her Best" by Grace Wong (Episodes 15-16, 18, 20, 23-24, 26 and 30)
- Composer: Alan Cheung Ka Shing
- Country of origin: Hong Kong
- Original language: Cantonese
- No. of episodes: 30

Production
- Producer: Marco Law
- Production locations: Hong Kong, Xiangshan Film and Television City, Tiantai Mountain
- Editor: Kwan Chung Ling
- Camera setup: Multi camera
- Running time: 45 minutes
- Production company: TVB

Original release
- Network: Jade; HD Jade
- Release: 30 June – 8 August 2014

Related
- Journey to the West; Rear Mirror

Ghost Dragon of Cold Mountain
- Traditional Chinese: 寒山潛龍
- Literal meaning: "Cold Mountain, Hidden Dragon"
Transcriptions
Standard Mandarin
- Hanyu Pinyin: hán shān qián lóng
Yue: Cantonese
- Yale Romanization: han shan qian long
- Jyutping: hon4 saan1 cim4 lung4

Ghost Dragon of Cold Mountain (Traditional Chinese: 寒山潛龍; literally "Cold Mountain, Hidden Dragon"; Chinese: 寒山潛龍; Jyutping: hon4 saan1 cim4 lung4) is a 2014 Hong Kong period drama produced by TVB, starring Kenneth Ma and Rosina Lam as the main leads, with Pierre Ngo, Power Chan, Raymond Cho, Selena Li and Lau Kong as the rest of the main supporting cast. Filming began in May 2013 and finished in October 2013. Indoor scenes were filmed at TVB studios in Tseung Kwan O, New Territories, Hong Kong. Outdoor scenes were filmed on location in mainland China at Xiangshan Film and Television City and Tiantai Mountain. The series began airing June 30. 2014 and will be broadcast weekly from Monday to Friday at 8:30 PM.

== Pre-release ==
The series was previewed at the Hong Kong FILMART 2014 event on 24 March 2014.

== Story ==
During the chaotic period of Imperial China, before the unification of the country, there exists two opposing regimes: the Song and Jin. The story focuses on the exploits of the Tin Kei (Phecda) Bureau of the Northern Song. It's a special investigative unit that answers directly to the emperor, who is headed by Commissioner Fung Nam Tin (Lau Kong). With his highly skilled group of constables, Fung Nam Tin was able to protect the realm against criminals and enemies of the state.

Prior to the main events of the story, Fung Nam Tin raised and trained a talented protege, Chu Cheung Sing (Kenneth Ma). A talented investigator and strong martial artist, Cheung Sing was to be groomed to become the next commander of the bureau; Cheung Sing ends up leaving the agency due to differences with Fung Nam Tin. Cheung Sing was secretly undercover to expose a triad gang led by Sou Fu. After Cheung Sing had Sou Fu's gang arrested, he and Nam Tin had a dispute over handling the fate of Sou Fu's family. He resigned to live a simple and peaceful life and eventually married his beloved Tou Fa (Selena Li). Together with Tou Fa, Cheung Sing spent the next decade being a supportive husband and help run their tavern until the bureau came looking for him.

In between, Fung Nam Tin continues to maintain his bureau and recruited some talented constables to his service. Ma Chuen Kung (Power Chan), Ngau Dai Lik (Pierre Ngo), and Yeung Mau (Lin Xiawei) are Nam Tin's more recent members to the Phecda Bureau. Ma Chuen Kung is the childhood friend of the current Emperor Chui Juk Hei and a talented martial artist as well as herbalist. Chuen Kung's family name was tarnished after his father, General Ma, was accused of betraying the kingdom and committed suicide. Chuen Kung loses his only sister and the rest of his family is gone; he was given amnesty for his father's charges of treason against the court. Yeung Mau, a beautiful tomboyish constable; she believes in the importance of service and is determined to prove she's as capable as the rest of the men. Ngau Dai Lik, a former talented thief who turned a new leaf, he wishes to prove his worth and bury his history.

Ten years later, Sou Fu escapes prison and demands to even the scales with Cheung Sing. Nam Tin dispatches Ma Chuen Kung, Ngau Dai Lik, and Yeung Mau to arrest Sou Fu. With Cheung Sing as their only lead, the three finds him and the quartet successfully arrests Sou Fu. Afterwards, Cheung Sing was drawn back to the Phecda Bureau. Partially due to Cheung Sing missing his old life, his loyalty for Nam Tin, and his wife's desire to have him utilize his full potential at the bureau, he returns to the Phecda Bureau and leads the Sun Team.

Back in his old town, Cheung Sing's return was met with mixed feelings. Seh Bak Nin, a fellow orphan adopted by the bureau, has always aimed to lead the bureau one day. However, with Cheung Sing's return, he felt threatened and jealous as Cheung Sing resolved great cases that brought glory to the Sun Team of the Phecda Bureau, but he and his Moon Team suffered under their shadow. However, Cheung Sing was welcomed back by old friends, such as his underworld best buddy, Hung Sup Kau (Raymond Cho), heir to the Dragon Society.

Although their city was peaceful, things become complicated when a series of corrupted characters arrived to town. Three brothers, each involved in abusing their privileges as being related to Empress Dowager Gung Shun Bik, had the town at their mercy as no court dared to prosecute them for their crimes. No longer able to tolerate such injustice, Chuen Kung becomes a masked vigilante that would expose some of the worst and protected villains of society by beating them and then publicly shaming them for their crimes. Because he used yams to stuff his victims' mouths, he earned the moniker Yam Man. Although not his intention, Yam Man had taken a life of its own and even became an idol to the public that suffered under the court's incompetence.

Knowing that the emperor had lost the public's respect, Chuen Kung helped the emperor realize the error of his ways and successfully made him a better ruler. However, Empress Dowager Gung Shun Bik and Fourth Prince Chui Chun Dhun (uncle to the emperor) plots to undermine the emperor and aims to destroy his supporters, including the Phecda Bureau. With the emperor setting the court to a better direction, Chuen Kung retires as Yam Man, but Prince Chun Dhun takes advantage of Yam Man's absence and caused a series of extreme murders against the corrupted to force the emperor to call for the arrest of Yam Man. Prince Chun Dhun put the Phecda's investigative capabilities to the test, knowing they would fail and he would destroy the Phecda Bureau.

The investigation was rigged and the Phecda Bureau was incriminated by Prince Chun Dhun that the bureau was harboring Yam Man. However, Nam Tin anticipated such a plot and brought his own Yam Man (faked by Sup Kau) to confuse the investigators. The Phecda Bureau all attacked Yam Man as a display of their innocence and loyalties. After successfully "killing" Yam Man, the bureau was exonerated, but it didn't stop Prince Chun Dhun from trying to undermining the emperor. Feeling cheated out of his destiny as ruler and unable to tolerate his nephew's inability to lead the country, the prince plots to a coup to take control of the kingdom himself.

Realizing the people and the court wouldn't be so easily swayed to his side without coercion, Prince Chun Dhun sets a series of events to make the emperor desperate for help to manage his health and kingdom. Resorting to a cult leader for spiritual guidance and health, the emperor did many drastic social impositions that angered both the people and the court, creating the perfect conditions to take over as the new emperor. However, thanks to the interference of the Phecda Bureau, the prince's plans were thwarted. Prince Chun Dhun was banished to a Buddhist monastery and Empress Dowager Gung Shun Bik lost all her influence to the court due to her treason.

In between, Tou Fa and Cheung Sing had separated. Tou Fa had trouble giving an heir to Cheung Sing and just when she finally got pregnant, she got into an accident and had a miscarriage. Feeling guilty she destroyed Cheung Sing's dream of having children, she left him and encouraged him to find another woman to procreate with. Not long after Tou Fa's hiatus, a new courtesan amongst the brothel scene had won great acclaim, Yan Mei Neong. To Cheung Sing's surprise, Yan Mei Neong looks just like Tou Fa. Believing her to be his wife faking her identity as some strange way to get back at him, he made it his mission to woo his wife back, but realized it wasn't her because Yan Mei Neong knew martial arts and his wife wasn't trained. It would be later revealed that Yan Mei Neong is Tou Fa's long lost elder identical twin sister.

Yan Mei Neong was admired greatly by many and became attracted to Cheung Sing because he's the only man that couldn't be enthralled by her charms. Realizing he is missing badly for Tou Fa, Mei Neong easily fooled Cheung Sing by mimicking her younger sister and spent the night with him, leading her to be pregnant. When the real Tou Fa returned, Cheung Sing wasn't sure how to explain himself and things got complicated when Mei Neong reunited with Tou Fa as sisters. After the secret was blown, Tou Fa was hurt and decided to leave Cheung Sing to make it easier for him to love her sister and take care of his child. However, Cheung Sing was ever loyal to his wife and even publicly embarrassed himself by officially making it a court case to prove he was duped into sleeping with Yan Mei Neong and not because he was unfaithful. Once it was proven he was tricked into infidelity, Tou Fa returned to Cheung Sing's side, but earned the ire and wrath of Mei Neong.

Later on, the fate of the Song Kingdom will be threatened again. Fung Nam Tin is secretly a plant operative for the Jin Kingdom. After the bureau had saved the emperor from his corrupt officials, the emperor developed a reliant trust on Nam Tin and made him his right-hand man of the court, High Chancellor of the court. Secretly though, he had made moves to slowly strip away the emperor's influence and power. Nam Tin secretly had the good court officials quietly murdered and recruited the corrupt to defect and serve the Jin. Nam Tin gave Cheung Sing a chance to live out his days with his wife in peace and comfort, but Cheung Sing's sense of duty and investigative nature motivated him to uncover the truth; it resulted in Tou Fa's death.

Due to Nam Tin's and Mei Neong's trap, the Sun Team was incriminated for crimes against the court. Because the evidence was still too murky to be conclusive, the emperor couldn't execute Cheung Sing, Chuen Kung, Dai Lik, nor Yeung Mau. Due to their past services to the court, they were forgiven of all charges, but they must be stripped of their fortunes and must never be involved with the court ever again or risk execution. Cheung Sing later became a grieving widower that makes a living by collecting excrement buckets. Chuen Kung's ever persistent nature to save his emperor and friend resulted him to become a Buddhist monk. Dai Lik and Yeung Mau married, but now spent their days recovering damaged junk to sell refurbished furniture and repaired kitchen wares as a living.

At the court, Nam Tim helps Mei Neong get close to the emperor and is now his favorite concubine. Sleeping with the emperor, she managed to convince him that the baby she carries is the future prince of the country and not Cheung Sing's. At the bureau, Seh Bak Nin's desire for power and respect motivated him to betray his country and work with Nam Tin; Bak Nin was promoted as the new commander of the bureau. Bak Nin's dream came true at the price of killing his Moon teammate and lover, Mao. All seems well for Nam Tim to set his coup into action for the Jin.

In the most ironic of circumstances, Chuen Kung meets Prince Chun Dhun at the monastery. Both are aware that their kingdom is poised to fall under the Jin due to the emperor's incompetence. With Nam Tim controlling the court as "acting emperor" and the emperor entranced under Mei Neong's charms, Chuen Kung pleads with the prince to take back the court to save their kingdom. However, the prince is reluctant and even pointed out his failed coup was meant to prevent such a situation to happen and points out the irony of things. However, the prince secretly builds a small force. Utilizing unusual methods, the prince recruited the social underworld to aid him in their mutual goal to save their home from the Jin. After watching the Dragon Society work hard to save the good court officials, Dai Lik, Yeung Mau, and Sup Kau joined forces with the prince and eventually Chuen Kung as well. The last person they wanted in their ranks was Cheung Sing.

Still in terrible grief over the loss of Tou Fa, Cheung Sing believes Mei Neong was directly involved with Tou Fa's death and prepares to become a suicide bomber to take her with him in the afterlife. However, his former teammates found him and stopped him. While in a dream, Tou Fa visits him and convinces him to let her go as she's dead and he must live on. After finally realizing he should live for his wife, he joins the rebellion as well.

Knowing that the prince's rebellion isn't enough to win, Cheung Sing had a far more clever plan that promises not even the loss of a single soldier: a grand bluff. The prince paid a visit to the Prince of Jin and made a bold statement that they're not afraid of warring against their country as they have developed powerful Dragon Cannons that can annihilate their army. To further scare him, they used a miniature cannon to convince them of their superior war technologies, scaring the prince to convince Nam Tin to retreat. At the height of victory for the Jin, Nam Tim was shocked at the turn of events as the prince ordered him to stand down. However, investing for 40 years into winning the Song Kingdom for the Jin, he couldn't give so easily and plots to kidnap the emperor and force both sides into a drawn out war. However, the Sun Team members cornered Nam Tin. It was there that Nam Tim admitted he was the one who killed Tou Fa. Mei Neong also revealed she faked siding with Nam Tin to get revenge for her sister. The quartet was conflicted to bring down Nam Tin as he saved all of them and made them strong, however, Nam Tin didn't mind the irony of his defeat and even expressed pride in their skills. In the end, Nam Tin cut his own throat, ending the Jin takeover.

Back at the court, the emperor secretly abdicated the throne to his uncle. Realizing the life of a ruler is too much for him, he faked his death and assumed a new identity and became an aristocratic traveler; Chun Dhun now reigns as emperor. The new emperor had all traitors rounded up and prosecuted under the maximum penalty of death for their treason. Chun Dhun rewarded the Phecda Bureau for their hard work and made Cheung Sing commissioner of the bureau. It was revealed that Chuen Kung's father was set up by Nam Tin all those years ago and now the Ma family name can be cleared. For the Dragon Society's contribution, they were awarded with an iron scroll to prevent them from ever going to jail over their criminal activities.

Several years has passed and Cheung Sing continues to lead the bureau. Although Chuen Kung was pardoned to be a monk, he enjoys the lifestyle and remains a monk and also a constable. Dai Lik and Yeung Mau now leads the Sun and Moon teams and the couple are still happily married. Meanwhile, Chuen Kung tells Cheung Sing that Mei Neong suffered a head injury and lost her memories. While visiting Tou Fa's grave, Mei Neong appears before him with their son. No longer a temptress assassin, she actually believes she's Tou Fa. Cheung Sing asked Mei Neong to eat some yams with him while he tells her a story of their past. The story ends suggesting Cheung Sing will live a happy life, taking care of Mei Neong and their son.

== Investigations ==
- Ep. 1: The Hak Mok Nai bandits disguise as monks in order to assassinate one of the Song's princes.
- Ep. 1 - 2: Killer Sai Fu escapes from prison and demands Kung Lung (an undercover constable) be handed over to him or else he will poison civilians.
- Ep. 2: The bride for a marriage arranged by the Song Emperor to the Jurchen kingdom is kidnapped.
- Ep. 3 - 5: A mysterious person has been setting off bombs all over the capital and a high ranking government official has been murdered.
- Ep. 5: A swindler comes to town and causes the gambling parlors to go out of business. Is she that good or did she do something to her opponents?
- Ep. 6 - 9: The supposed haunted brothel is re-opened, but a maid is poisoned to death, a courtesan is able to make a depressed customer happy instantly, another courtesan has been murdered and someone is holding the secret that can help the Song dynasty against the Jurchen kingdom.
- Ep. 9 - 11: A vigilante is on the loose. He makes the emperor realize that he must take a stand against corruption and the emperor have the Phecda Bureau no longer pursue the case.
- Ep. 12 - 13: A whole family is killed when their house is burned down. The main suspect is one of Hung Sup Kau's lackeys.
- Ep. 13 - 19: A cult is recruiting people and one of Tou Fa's employees becomes a member. The leader of the cult proclaims himself to be the chosen prophet and is able to convince the Emperor.
- Ep. 18 - 19: Phecda Bureau suspects a mole in their own organization when the Fourth Prince and Eunuch Tin seems to know their every movement.
- Ep. 20 - 30: A killer that leaves a word on the victims bodies is on the loose. Cheung Sing, Chuen Kung, Dai Lik and Yeung Mau suspects the killer is someone within Phecda Bureau.

== Cast ==
=== Main cast ===
- Kenneth Ma 馬國明 as Chu Cheung Sing 朱長勝

His specialty is fighting and eagle eyes. A former constable who left the Tin Kei Agency over an argument on how he handled a case. For the past 10 years he has been living a peaceful life with his wife Tou Fa. He is asked to return to Tin Kei when a convicted killer he helped put away seeks revenge on him. Extremely devoted to his wife he is caught in a love triangle when her look-a-like Yan Mei Neong arrives in town.

- Rosina Lam 林夏薇 as Yeung Lau 楊柳

A female constable. She is good at fighting but tends to act impulsively. She develops feelings for the night vigilante "Yam Man" because of his advice to her and his heroism in helping the bullied and needy. When she finds out that Ma Chuen Kung is Yam Man, she and Kwan Ciu become rivals for Chuen Kung's affections. She and Dai Lik get married when they are kicked out of Tin Kei Agency.

- Pierre Ngo 敖嘉年 as Ngau Dai Lik 牛大力

His specialty is disguise and acting. A former robber that has been reformed. Only Fung Nam Tin knows of his true identity but the rest of the constables grow suspicious of him and found out who he was. He is illiterate as he doesn't know how to read or write much words. He also secretly likes Yeung Mau and flirts with her constantly, which she finds annoying. He and Yeung Mau get married when they are kicked out of Tin Kei Agency.

- Power Chan 陳國邦 as Ma Chuen Kung 馬川芎

His specialty is medicine, poison and forensics, he is able to diagnose and cure any illness or poison. He is the voice of reason and thinker of the constables. He has a personal relationship with the Emperor since his late father was a general. He dresses as his alter-ego "Yam Man" in order to punish those that Tin Kei Agency cannot. He pretends to become a monk in order to look for the exiled Fourth Prince who is needed to expose Fung Nam Tin.

- Raymond Cho 曹永廉 as Hung Sup Kau 熊十九

Son of the local triad boss Hung Fung. He manages all of his father's businesses, but it's for show only since his father sees him as a dimwit. He has a bullish personality and attitude but is really a kind person. He and Ma Wan Liang become friends when she turns a new leaf. He likes Wan Liang and even proposes to her but she turns him down. He is devastated when he finds out she is a impostor pretending to be Cheun Kung's sister and that the one she likes is Cheun Kung. After Wan Ling truly reforms they get married.

- Selena Lee 李詩韻 as Tou Fa 桃花/Yan Mei Neong 殷媚娘

Tou Fa - Chu Cheung Sing's loving, caring and understanding wife. She and her husband managed a small restaurant in the small village they live in. When an escaped convict comes looking for revenge against her husband she finds out his true identity. When she arrives at the capital Fung Nam Tin buys her a restaurant to manage. Due to her carelessness she has a miscarriage, the injury leaves her unable to ever get pregnant again.Her guilt in losing the baby pushes her to leave Cheung Sing in order for him to have a child with another women. Tou Fa is also Yan Mei Neong's sister.
Yan Mei Neong - A famous courtesan that looks exactly like Tou Fa. The entire town and Cheung Sing mistakes her to be Tou Fa when she first arrives at the capital. Her love for Chu Cheung Sing causes him to have confused feelings for her. She is ambitious and uses her beauty to get what she wants. With her mysterious past and connections she helps Cheung Sing solve his cases. Cheung Sing's devotion to his wife makes her infatuated with him, this forces her to impersonate as Tou Fa in order for Cheung Sing to think she is his wife. Yan Mei Neong is also Tou Fa's sister.

=== Supporting cast ===
==== Tin Kei Agency ====
- Lau Kong 劉江 as Fung Nam Tin 鳳南天

Head of the Tin Kei Agency. Chu Cheung Sing's mentor and the emperors advisor. He is constantly at odds with the Fourth Prince and Empress Dowager due to his influence over the Emperor in making sure relatives of the two are punished for crimes or corruption they have committed. Main villain and spy for the Jurchen kingdom. He commits suicide after his treacherous hard work and plan fails.

- Eric Li Tin Cheung 李天翔 as Seh Bak Nin 佘百年

A constable who grew up with Chu Cheung Sing. The leader of the other Tin Kei Team. He becomes jealous of Cheung Sing when he loses to him at the yearly Tin Kei Agency competition. The Fourth Prince recruits him to be a spy in order to dispose of Tin Kei Agency but he stays loyal to Fung Nam Tin. His hunger for power makes him co-conspire with Fung Nam Tin to be traitors against the Song dynasty.

- Candy Chang 張慧雯 as Ma Wan Ling 馬雲苓/ Kwan Ciu 關超

A swindler that uses poison when playing mahjong to confuse her opponents. She hated Ma Chuen Kung because he is able to cure all her poisons, but he finds out she is his long lost sister. She joins Tin Kei Agency to work alongside her brother, but is later suspected of being a spy due to Tin Kei Agency's missions always foiling ever since she joined. She is also found to be an impostor of Chuen Kung's long lost sister hired by Eunuch Tin. Her plot was to get close to Chuen Kung so she can kill him, but ends up falling for him when he is super nice to her.

- Aurora Li 李君妍 as Mo 舞

The other female constable at Tin Kei. She is Seh Bak Nin's love interest. She does whatever is possible to help Bak Nin succeed. She is killed by Bak Nin when she uncovers him and Fung Nam Tin are spies working for the Jurchen kingdom.

- Hoffman Cheung 鄭世豪 as Ng Tak Gwong 伍德廣

Poisons and beats up Seh Bak Nin when he finds out Bak Nin killed Mo and is a Jurchen kingdom spy working together with Fung Nam Tin.

- Hugo Wang 黃子恆 as Choy 財

Poisons and beats up Seh Bak Nin when he finds out Bak Nin killed Mo and is a Jurchen kingdom spy working together with Fung Nam Tin.

- Kelvin Leung 梁証嘉 as Yun 源

A constable that was engaged to marry his cousin but was mysteriously killed while searching for Wan Ling one night with Chuen Kung, Dai Lik and Yeung Mau.

- Chiu Lok Yin 趙樂賢 as Jun 進

A constable that assists Chuen Kung in his forensic investigating. Poisons and beats up Seh Bak Nin when he finds out Bak Nin killed Mo and is a Jurchen kingdom spy working together with Fung Nam Tin.

- Ken Law 羅浩銘 as Kwan 群

Poisons and beats up Seh Bak Nin when he finds out Bak Nin killed Mo and is a Jurchen kingdom spy working together with Fung Nam Tin.

==== Northern Song ====
- Ram Chiang 蔣志光 as Emperor Chui Juk Hei 皇上趙旭熹

An immature emperor who is influenced to do right when he ventures out of the palace and sees that his subjects do not respect him. He was originally afraid of offending the Empress Dowager but the vigilante "Yam Man" makes him realize how to be an emperor that is respected. He has no direction on how to rule and can be heavily influenced by outsiders. He does not like being the emperor and later fakes his own death so he can live a normal life.

- Mary Hon 韓馬利 as Empress Dowager Gung Shun Bik 太后公孫璧

The Emperor's step-mother. She is unhappy with Fung Nam Tin's influence over the Emperor when her relatives are punished for crimes and corruption they have committed and her no longer having any power over the Emperor. She plots together with the Fourth Prince to dispose the Tin Kei Agency. She and the Fourth Prince are in a secret love affair.

- KK Cheung 張國強 as Fourth Prince Chui Chun Dhun 四王爺趙存端

The Emperor's fourth uncle. He and the Empress Dowager plot together to dispose the Tin Kei Agency due to Fung Nam Tin's influence over the Emperor. He tries to recruit Yu Bak Nin as his spy to help him dispose the Tin Kei Agency. He plans to usurp the throne from his nephew, the Emperor, who he sees as an incompetent ruler. His plot to usurp the throne is found out but the Emperor spares his life. After helping the Emperor get rid of Fung Nam Tin he becomes the new Emperor when the previous emperor fakes his own death.

- Lo Chun Shun 魯振順 as Eunuch Tin 田公公

The Fourth Prince's trusted eunuch and personal body guard. He hires Kwan Ciu to impersonate Chuen Kung's long lost sister in order for her to kill Chuen Kung and be his spy at Tin Kei Agency.

- Ocean Wong Tak Sang 黄得生 as Sui An Te 小安子

A young eunuch that serves by the Emperor's side. Betrays the Emperor by working for the Fourth Prince and Empress Dowager in helping the Emperor think he is delusional. His betrayal is uncovered and he is banished from the country as his punishment by the Emperor.

- Ali Lee 李佳芯 as Yun Fei 婉妃

One of the Emperors royal concubines. She uses her music skills to help smooth the Emperor's stress.

- Jimmy Au 歐瑞偉 as General Fu Man 撫蠻將軍

Song General in charge of the cannon ammunition. Does not like Seh Bak Nin.

- Chan Wing Chun 陳榮峻

Song Court official.

- Ricky Wong Chun Tong 王俊棠

Song Court official who betrays the Song Emperor by siding with Fung Nam Tin.

==== Dragon Society ====
- Law Lok Lam 羅樂林 as Hung Fung 熊峰

Hung Sup Kau's father. Head of the Dragon Society. A fearless leader who stands up to all even royal commands for members in the Dragon society. He owns the local brothels and gambling parlors. He is an expert at gambling but is found out that he is partially blind when he could not defeat Kwan Ciu in a game of mahjong. He loves his son but also thinks of him as a dimwitted idiot.

- Man Yeung Ching Wah 楊證樺 as Bak Te Sin 白子善/ Chan Zit 陈哲

Hung Fung's trusted assistant and godson. In his youth he worked in the royal artillery research department under his real name Chan Zit, but because he felt the emperor was heartless in not caring for the injured workers he and his mentor conspire to blow up the capital and kill the emperor. He self sacrificed his life in order for his mentor to carry out their plan.

- Steve Lee Ka Ding 李家鼎 as Gai Gor 佳哥

A high-ranking member of the Dragon Society. He works as a vigilante at night to save government officials that are being murdered by Fung Nam Tin.

- Chan Dik Hak 陳狄克 as Tsuen Gor 全哥

A high-ranking member of the Dragon Society. While fighting with his wife in the streets they accidentally shaved off half of Cheung Sing's mustache.

- Lee Hoi San 李海生 as Fu Gor 富哥
- Eddie Li Gong Lung 李岡龍 as Gwai Gor 貴哥

A high-ranking member of the Dragon Society. Hung Fung and Sup Kau saves his young daughter from being captured by the royal guards when they lie that she is Sup Kau's fiancée.

- Ronald Law 羅鈞滿 as Ng Wai 吳威

Hung Sup Kau's lackey. He is accused of arson and murdering an entire family when witnesses see him with a bucket near the crime scene.

==== Flower Scent Brothel ====
- Yoyo Chen 陳自瑤 as Cau Yuet 秋月

Chu Cheung Sing's former girlfriend. They were to elope together but he neglected her in order to go undercover on a case. She was from a wealthy family but becomes a courtesan when she meets Cheung Sing again. She finally gets over Cheung Sing when he uses her to solve the brothel case.

- Charmaine Li 李思欣 as Dong Yee 冬兒

A courtesan who murdered another courtesan because they held the secret that could help the Song dynasty. Instead of handing the "secret" over to the Tin Kei Agency she wanted to sell it for money.

- Jess Sum 沈卓盈 as Chun Mui 春梅

A courtesan who is good friends with Cau Yu, Dong Yee and Ha Lin.

- Kibby Lau 劉俐 as Ha Lin 夏蓮

A courtesan who is good friends with Cau Yu, Dong Yee and Chun Mui. Dong Yee kills her because she disagrees with her plan to sell the "secret" for money.

- Iva Law 羅泳嫻 as Lee Gwai Lan 李桂蘭

A courtesan who uses drugs to make her clients happy. She was framed for murdering the maid who overdosed on her drugs.

==== Others ====
- Wong Wai Tak 王維德 as Sai Fu 仇虎

A convicted murderer who seeks revenge against Chu Cheung Sing for putting him in prison. He realizes his faults when he sees that Cheung Sing has been taking care of his wife and son all these years.

- Tang Ying Man 鄧英敏 as Ho Yun Ngoi 何員外

The emperor arranged for his daughter to marry to the Jurchen kingdom but she is kidnapped during her journey.

- Matthew Ko 高鈞賢 as Chu Yuk Lau 朱玉樓

A scholar that Yeung Mau meets while she is undercover as a courtesan at the brothel. Yeung Mau falls in love with him thinking he is utterly devoted to her but he turns out to be a gigolo who cons women for gifts and money.

- Raymond Chiu Wing Hung 趙永洪 as Dai Ho Yan 戴浩仁

The Empress Dowager's nephew. Ma Chuen Kung tries to match make him with his sister Wan Ling. He murders his father but escapes punishment because of the Empress Dowager orders. He is mysteriously killed and the Fourth Prince uses him as a ploy to frame "Yam Man" for his murder.

- Sam Tsang Hong Sang 曾航生 as Chan Gut 陳吉 / Chan Lei 陳利

Chan Gut - Leader of the Yuk Siu Cult. A self proclaimed prophet that is able to convince the Emperor that he is the chosen one that can lead the Song dynasty to victory against the Jurchen kingdom. He is really a con artist that works for the Fourth Prince and Empress Dowager in helping them control the Emperor.
Chan Lei - Chan Gut's identical twin brother. Unable to see his brother's continued path in deception he helps Tin Kei Agency in unfolding his brother's and the Fourth Prince plans on usurping the royal throne in exchange on making sure his brother remains unharmed and is freed.

- Aaryn Cheung 張明偉 as Hak Ci 客似

Works at Tou Fa's restaurant. Originally named Man Hum, Hung Sup Kau gives him a new name because his original name sounded unlucky. According to Tou Fa he is quite good at fighting and she sponsors him to become a government official.

- Helen Seng 沈愛琳 as Wan Loi 雲來

Works at Tou Fa's restaurant. Originally named Law Yurk, Hung Sup Kau gives her a new name because her original name sounded unlucky. She becomes brain washed when she joins the Yuk Siu Cult.

- Yu Chi Ming 余子明 as Gwaa Suk 瓜叔

An elderly farmer who supplies vegetables to Tou Fa's restaurant.

- Joe Junior as Ying Suk 瑛叔

A weapon expert that was an old acquaintance of Chuen Kung's father.

- Ho Yuen Tung 何遠東

==== Cameo ====
- Jonathan Cheung 張頴康 as Prince of Jurchen kingdom 金國太子

A Jurchen kingdom Prince who wants to back off from invading the Song dynasty in fear of losing the entire Jurchen kingdom army.

== Development ==
Kevin Cheng was originally considered for the lead during the drama development stage, but had to turn down the role due to his conflicting schedule of filming in mainland China. The lead male role was then offered to Steven Ma by TVB executive Catherine Tsang, but Ma turned down the role as well since he decided not to renew his TVB contract. Charmaine Sheh was offered the female lead as a return to TVB, but turned down the role as she did not want to act in a wuxia drama at that time.

The original 1 minute 18 seconds sales presentation clip shown in 2012 featured Kenneth Ma, Kenny Wong, Raymond Wong Ho-yin, Aimee Chan and Priscilla Wong. The plot shown on the sales clip was about assassins but was later announced that the storyline would be re-written to be somewhat similar to "The Four Great Constables" storyline.

In April 2013 it was announced that Selena Li will be part of the supporting cast. Aimee Chan was originally scheduled to play the role "Yeung Mau" but withdrew from the drama due to her pregnancy and marriage at that time to Moses Chan. Lin Xiawei took over her lead role.

Costume fitting was held on May 23, 2013. The filming blessing ceremony was held on June 20, 2013. Local extras were used for filming of outdoor scenery in mainland China, Cantonese voice over actors were used to dub any mainland extras that had spoken parts.

== Viewership ratings ==
Week	Episodes	Date	Average Points	Peaking Points
1	01－05	June 30-July 4, 2014	22	25
2	06－10	July 7–11, 2014	23	25
3	11－15	July 14–18, 2014	25	29
4	16－20	July 21–25, 2014	24	26
5	21－25	July 28-Aug 1, 2014	24	26
6	26－30	Aug 4–8, 2014	24	27

== Parodies ==
- Ep. 10 & 16 - The adulterous couple that Dai Gwaa Hop punishes is based on the story of The Book of Water Margin, Wu Song's story about the affair of Ximen Qing and Pan Jinlian.
