= Kenneth Ma =

- 馬國明
- Ma in 2026
- Born: 13 February 1974 (age 52); British Hong Kong
- Education: BEng. Mechanical Engineering; U British Columbia, 1998
- Occupation: Actor
- Years active: 1999–present
- Notable work: The Hippocratic Crush series The Exorcist's Meter series Big White Duel series The QUEEN of News
- Spouse: Roxanne Tong (m. 2023)
- Awards: See in article
- Musical career
- Also known as: Ma Ming (馬明)

Chinese name
- Traditional Chinese: 馬國明
- Simplified Chinese: 马国明
Transcriptions
Standard Mandarin
- Hanyu Pinyin: Mǎ Guómíng
Yue: Cantonese
- Jyutping: Maa5 Gwok3 Ming4

Kenneth Ma Kwok-ming (born 13 February 1974) is a Hong Kong actor contracted to TVB.

Ma had won the Most Popular Male Character award at the TVB Anniversary Awards for four times in 2012, 2017, 2018 and 2021 respectively, becoming the TVB actor with the most wins in that category. In 2019, he won the TVB Anniversary Award for Best Actor with his role in the drama Big White Duel.

== Early life ==
As the youngest of a family of three children, Kenneth Ma has two older twin sisters. He attended Salesian English School before immigrating with his family to Vancouver, British Columbia, Canada in 1992. His father, who worked as a mechanical engineer, would travel back and forth between Hong Kong and Vancouver for work. At first his family lived in Richmond before settling in Port Coquitlam. After attending one semester at Douglas College, he transferred to University of British Columbia majoring in mechanical engineering. During college, Ma joined an acting troupe that would perform sketches. After graduating from college in 1998, Ma and his entire family decided to return to Hong Kong.

When Ma returned to Hong Kong, he initially worked at a glass manufacturing company as a quality surveillance inspector but found his job boring. Hoping to find something more of his interest, he sent out over 70 resumes but only received a response from TVB for an interview notice to their 14th Artist Training Class. His starting salary at TVB was a meager estimated HK$4000.00 a month, one third of his former job salary, but since he found acting to be more suitable for him, he decided to join TVB.

== Career ==
In the beginning of Ma’s career at TVB, he often played extras, passers-by and fill ins. One of Ma's early roles was playing the giant cockroach “Siu Keung” in Dayo Wong's music video "Blue Sky". Within 5 years since graduating from TVB's training course, the company started to promote him when he was chosen as one of the S4's in 2003 drama Triumph in the Skies and later as one of the six "siu sangs" to be the "Olympic 6" (the other five being Sammul Chan, Ron Ng, Bosco Wong, Raymond Lam and Lai Lok-yi) during the 2004 Athens Olympic Games.

In 2006, Ma won the Most Improved Male Artiste award at the TVB Anniversary Awards. In late 2007, he played his first leading role in the drama Survivor's Law II.

In 2012, Ma gained recognition with his role as Cheung Yat-kin in the critical acclaimed medical drama The Hippocratic Crush, winning awards from both Malaysia (Favourite TVB Actor) and Hong Kong (My Favourite Male Character).

After starring in the hit 2013 drama Triumph in the Skies II, Ma caught the eye of international star Jackie Chan and was invited to star in the romantic comedy Fate Is a Game.

In 2017, Ma starred in the critically acclaimed supernatural drama The Exorcist's Meter as the taxi driver and exorcist Ma Kwai (Siu Ma). Acknowledging his strong performance in that series, Ma was labelled as "citizen's best actor pick" and became a strong contender for the Best Actor award at the 2017 TVB Anniversary Awards. He eventually won the Most Popular Male Character award, which was his second win in that category. In addition, Ma won the Best Actor in a Leading Role awards in both the People's Choice TV Awards 2017 and the Hong Kong Television Awards 2017, which served as a public recognition, as all awardees were 100% voted for by audience and netizens.

In 2018, Ma won the Most Popular Male Character award for the third time at the TVB Anniversary Awards with his role in the period drama Deep in the Realm of Conscience.

In 2019, Ma starred in critical acclaimed medical drama Big White Duel, eventually winning the Best Actor award at the TVB Anniversary Awards.

With his role in 2021 medical drama Kids’ Lives Matter, Ma won the Most Popular Male Character award at the TVB Anniversary Awards, which is his fourth win in that category.

== Personal life ==
Ma lives with his parents in a 900 square feet flat located in Tai Koo City, Hong Kong. He has said that his future wife must get along with his parents and be able to live together with them.

During his youth, Ma and his mother were fans of Leslie Cheung. Ma's mother adopted her western name after Cheung's hit song "Monica". At age 14, Ma was featured in Cheung's 1988 Pepsi commercial.

Ma is known to commute to work via mass transit even though he owns a car. He is a soccer fan and supporter of Real Madrid, Manchester United, and AC Milan.

Ma met Jacqueline Wong in 2015 during the filming of Inspector Gourmet. The two announced their relationship in 2017, but broke up after Wong was spotted kissing married star Andy Hui in April 2019.

On 12 June 2020, Ma and Roxanne Tong were found to be dating in Hung Hom. They admitted their relationship on the next day via Instagram. They became engaged in 2023. They got married in December 2023.

== Filmography ==
=== Television dramas ===
Year	Title	Role	Notes	Ref.
1999	Witness to a Prosecution	Prince	Cameo	
1999	Life for Life	Yuk-suet’s friend	Cameo	
1999	At the Threshold of an Era	Stanley	Cameo	
2000	Ups and Downs	Doctor	Cameo	
2000	When Dreams Come True	Real estate manager	Cameo	
2000	War of the Genders	Franco	Ep. 14	
2000	The Threat of Love	Guest	Cameo	
2000	At the Threshold of an Era II	Doctor	Cameo	
2000	Armed Reaction II	Male Artiste	Ep. 27	
2000	Lost In Love	Lin Tin-lok’s friend	Ep. 10	
2000	Return of the Cuckoo	Chuk Kwan-ho's classmate	Cameo	
2000	The Legendary Four Aces	Suzhou citizen / Treasury staff	Ep. 1–3, 36	
2000	Street Fighters	Plainclothes police	Cameo	
2000	A Matter of Customs	Doctor	Cameo	
2000	Healing Hands II	Drunk man	Cameo	
2000	Crimson Sabre	Ng Tuk Religion believer	Cameo	
2000	FM701	Tang Sanzang	Ep. 13	
2001	FM701	Gordon	Ep. 72	
2001	Seven Sisters	Gangster	Ep. 3	
2001	Armed Reaction III	Bank staff / EODB officer	Ep. 12, 32	
2001	In the Realm of Success	Doctor Cheung	Ep. 4	
2001	Colourful Life	Scholar	Ep. 4	
2001	Screen Play	Leon	Cameo	
2001	Reaching Out	Staff	Cameo	
2001	Gods of Honour	Physician	Ep. 28	
2001	Virtues of Harmony	Yat Yeung Tsz	Ep. 6	
2001	The White Flame	Emergency room doctor	Cameo	
2001	At Point Blank	Chan Siu-ming’s colleague	Cameo	
2001	The Battle Against Evil	Soldier	Cameo	
2001	On the Track or Off	TV station photographer	Cameo	
2001	The Heaven Sword & the Dragon Sabre	Soldier / Waiter	Cameo	
2001	A Step into the Past	Kam Ching's deceased husband	Ep. 34	
2001	Country Spirit	Physician	Ep. 4	
2001	The Awakening Story	Joe	Cameo	
2001	The Stamp of Love	CID officer	Ep. 30	
2002	Virtues of Harmony	Gangster / Hawker / Ma On-shan / Colleague	Ep. 99, 109, 140, 157, 181	
2002	Law Enforcers	Mark	Cameo	
2002	Legal Entanglement	Playboy	Ep. 10	
2002	Love is Beautiful	Prison Guard / Gentleman / Soldier	Cameo	
2002	Invisible Journey	Bill Collector	Cameo	
2002	A Case of Misadventure	Kong Sei-hoi’s underling	Cameo	
2002	A Herbalist Affair	Reporter	Cameo	
2002	Burning Flame II	Billy	Cameo	
2002	Fight For Love	Police officer	Cameo	
2002	Treasure Raiders	Chow Chi-kong	Cameo	
2002	Slim Chances	Peter	Cameo	
2002	Let’s Face It	Tam Tin-chak’s university schoolmate	Cameo	
2002	Family Man	Lawyer Wong	Cameo	
2002	Eternal Happiness	Lai Ming-tong		
2002	Doomed to Oblivion	Civil servant	Cameo	
2002	Golden Faith	Doctor	Introduced in Ep. 36	
2002	Love and Again	Manager	Cameo	
2002	Police Station No. 7	Police officer	Cameo	
2003	Whatever It Takes	Entourage	Cameo	
2003	Take My Word For It	SDU team leader	Ep. 30	
2003	Better Halves	Strong man	Cameo	
2003	The King of Yesterday and Tomorrow	Sam Yat-lai’s friend	Ep. 8	
2003	Vigilante Force	Passerby	Cameo	
2003	Good Against Evil	Sam	Cameo	
2003	In the Realm of Fancy	Guard	Cameo	
2003	Perish in the Name of Love	Entourage	Cameo	
2003	The Threat of Love II	Dancing coach	Cameo	
2003	Strike at Heart	Villager	Cameo	
2003	Survivor's Law	Joe Chan	Ep. 2-3	
2003	Point of No Return	Shing	Cameo	
2003	The Driving Power	Ko Wai-lei		
2003	Triumph in the Skies	Roy Ko Chi-wan		
2004	Armed Reaction IV	Andy	Cameo	
2004	The Vigilante in the Mask	Au-yeung Hing		
2004	Next Station Choi Hung	Lui Siu-lung		
2004	The Last Breakthrough	Doctor Shek	Ep. 18-21	
2004	Summer Heat	Adam	Cameo	
2004	Net Deception	David	Cameo	
2005	Scavengers' Paradise	Tang Ken-chan		
2005	Into Thin Air	Koon Ching-wan		
2005	Wong Fei Hung – Master of Kung Fu	Kan Kin		
2005	Lost in the Chamber of Love	Emperor Tak-chung		
2005	Misleading Track	Vincent		
2005	Life Made Simple	Jason	Ep. 28	
2006	La Femme Desperado	Ko Chi-lik	TVB Anniversary Award for Most Improved Male Artiste	
2006	Love Guaranteed	Tim Kwok Fu-kan	TVB Anniversary Award for Most Improved Male Artiste	
2006	To Grow with Love	Mak Ka-fai	TVB Anniversary Award for Most Improved Male Artiste	
2006	The Herbalist's Manual	Pong Hin	TVB Anniversary Award for Most Improved Male Artiste	
2007	The Brink of Law	Yan Heung-ming	Ep. 1-8	
2007	The Family Link	Kam Shing-chun		
2007–2008	Survivor's Law II	Sun Man-kwan (MK Sun)		
2008	The Master of Tai Chi	Mai Fung-nin		
2008	D.I.E.	SIP Hugo Shing Ka-chun		
2008	The Money-Maker Recipe	Sun Man-kwan (MK Sun)	Guest Appearance in Ep. 3	
2008	Speech of Silence	Leung Kai-yin (OK Jai)		
2008	Your Class or Mine	Sun Man-kwan (MK Sun)	Guest Appearance in Ep. 18–19	
2008	The Four	Tit Yau-ha / Fok Yi		
2009	Man in Charge	Chow Bing		
2009	In the Chamber of Bliss	Yu Yam-kwok		
2009	Born Rich	Sha Po-loi		
2010	Don Juan DeMercado	Kenneth Ma (Himself)	Guest Appearance in Ep. 6	
2010	A Fistful of Stances	Koo Yu-tong	My AOD Favourites Award for My Favourite Top 15 Drama Characters	
2010	The Mysteries of Love	SIP Gordon Lo Tin-hang		
2010	Can't Buy Me Love	Ting Yau-wai		
2011	Grace Under Fire	Yau Sam-shui	Main Role	
2011	Yes, Sir. Sorry, Sir!	Jack	Ep. 30	
2011	The Other Truth	Alex Kong Lok-man	Ep. 20–25	
2011	The Life and Times of a Sentinel	Fuk-chuen, 2nd Imperial Prince	My AOD Favourites Award for My Favourite Top 15 TVB Drama Characters	
2012	The Hippocratic Crush	Dr. Cheung Yat-kin	My AOD Favourites Awards for TV Actor, Top 15 TVB Drama Characters, Onscreen Couple (with Tavia Yeung); StarHub TVB Award for My Favourite TVB Male TV Characters; TVB Anniversary Award for My Favourite Male Character	
2012	Tiger Cubs	To Tin-yu	Ep. 1, 13	
2012	Three Kingdoms RPG	Vincent Szema Shun	StarHub TVB Award for My Favourite TVB Male TV Characters	
2012	Silver Spoon, Sterling Shackles	Charles Chung Kai-san		
2013	Season of Love	Joe Chu Cho-on	Ep. 16–20	
2013	Triumph in the Skies II	Roy Ko Chi-wang		
2013	The Hippocratic Crush II	Dr. Cheung Yat-kin	TVB Star Award Malaysia for Top 15 Drama Characters, Onscreen Couple (with Tavia Yeung); TVB Anniversary Gala Vote by Artistes for Best Actor	
2014	Ghost Dragon of Cold Mountain	Chu Cheung-Shing	Main Role; TVB Star Award Malaysia for Top 15 Favourite TVB Drama Characters; StarHub TVB Awards for My Favourite TVB Male TV Characters	
2014	A Time of Love	Oscar	Ep. 2	
2014	Come On, Cousin	Best actor	Guest Appearance in Ep. 2	
2014-2015	Noblesse Oblige	To Chun-fung	StarHub TVB Award for My Favourite TVB Male TV Characters	
2015	Lord of Shanghai	Young Kiu Ngo-tin	StarHub TVB Award for My Favourite TVB Male TV Characters	
2016	A Time of Love II	Oscar	Ep. 1	
2016	ICAC Investigators 2016	Roger Ko Wing-hong		
2016	Inspector Gourmet	Yeung Tak-kei (Bill Kei)		
2016-2017	Rogue Emperor	Chu Kam-chun		
2017	My Dearly Sinful Mind	Chung Tai-yin (TY)	StarHub TVB Award for My Favourite TVB Male TV Characters	
2017	Bet Hur	Lo Ping-on (OK Jai)	StarHub TVB Award for My Favourite TVB Onscreen Couple (with Charmaine Sheh)	
2017	Line Walker: The Prelude	Ngai Tak-lai	Guest Appearance in Ep. 30	
2017	The Exorcist's Meter	Ma Kwai (Siu Ma)	TVB Anniversary Award for Most Popular Male Character; Hong Kong Television Award for Best Leading Actor in Drama Series; People's Choice Television Award for Best Actor; People's Choice Television Award for Best TV Drama Partnership (with Hubert Wu)	
2018	Deep in the Realm of Conscience	Yam Sam-shu	TVB Anniversary Award for Most Popular Male Character	
2019	Big White Duel	Dr. Tong Ming	TVB Anniversary Award for Best Actor; StarHub Night of Star for Best TVB Male Artiste	
2020	The Exorcist’s 2nd Meter	Ma Kwai (Siu Ma)		
2020	Flying Tiger 2	Ting Ho-yin (Ting Sir)		
2020	Go! Go! Go! Operation C9	Bravo Ko Tai-king		
2020	Line Waker: Bull Fight	Wai Chok-wing (Wai Sir) / Ngai Tak-lai (Klein)		
2021	Armed Reaction 2021	Keanu	Guest Appearance in Ep. 1	
2021	Plan “B”	Yau Choi-shan		
2021	Kids' Lives Matter	Dr. Amos Fong Chung-yan	TVB Anniversary Award for Most Popular Male Character	
2022	Big White Duel II	Dr. Tong Ming		
2023	The Invisibles	"Ocean" Kan Yiu-yeung		
2023	Speakers of Law	Donald Kam Bing-shun		
2023	Narcotics Heroes	Ping On Gor	Guest Appearance in Ep. 30	
2023	The Queen of News	George Leung King-yan	TVB Anniversary Award for Favourite Actor in Malaysia	
2024	The Airport Diary	Yeung Sheung-wai		
2025	The Queen of News 2	George Leung King-yan		

=== Films ===
Year	Title	Role	Notes	Ref.
2003	The Final Shot		TV movie	
2003	Double Crossing		TV movie	
2004	The Healing Spirit	Angel	TV movie	
2004	Life in the Balance	Sit-in student	TV movie	
2004	Double Crossing	Cop	TV movie	
2010	72 Tenants of Prosperity	Firefighter	Cameo	
2014	Impetuous Love in Action			
2015	Triumph in the Skies	Roy Ko		
2018	Super Model Fantasy			

== Awards and nominations ==
=== TVB Anniversary Awards ===
Ma has won eight TVB Anniversary Awards between 2005 and 2023.

Year	Category	Work	Result	Ref.
2003	My Favourite Most Improved Male Artiste of the Year	The Driving Power, Triumph in the Skies	Nominated	
2004	My Favourite Most Improved Male Artiste of the Year	The Vigilante in the Mask, Next Station Choi Hung	Nominated	
2005	Most Improved Male Artiste	Scavengers' Paradise	Top 5	
2005	Best Actor	Scavengers' Paradise	Nominated	
2005	Best Supporting Actor	Into Thin Air	Top 5	
2006	Most Improved Male Artiste	La Femme Desperado, Love Guaranteed, To Grow With Love, The Herbalist's Manual	Won	
2006	Best Actor	Love Guaranteed — "Kwok Fu-kan (Tim)"	Nominated	
2007	Best Supporting Actor	The Family Link — "Kam Shing-chun"	Nominated	
2008	Best Actor	Survivor's Law II — "Sun Man-kwan"	Nominated	
2008	My Favourite Male Character	Survivor's Law II — "Sun Man-kwan"	Top 5	
2008	Best Supporting Actor	The Master of Tai Chi — "Mai Fung-nin"	Nominated	
2009	My Favourite Male Character	Man in Charge — "Chow Bing"	Nominated	
2009	Best Supporting Actor	Born Rich — "Sha Po-loi"	Top 5	
2010	My Favourite Male Character	A Fistful of Stances — "Koo Yu-tong"	Top 5	
2010	Best Supporting Actor	The Mysteries of Love — "Lo Tin-hang (Gordon)"	Nominated	
2011	Best Actor	The Life and Times of a Sentinel — "Fuk-chuen"	Nominated	
2012	Best Actor	The Hippocratic Crush — "Cheung Yat-kin"	Top 5	
2012	My Favourite Male Character	The Hippocratic Crush — "Cheung Yat-kin"	Won	
2013	Best Actor	The Hippocratic Crush II — "Cheung Yat-kin"	Top 5	
2013	Most Popular Male Character	The Hippocratic Crush II — "Cheung Yat-kin"	Top 5	
2013	Best Supporting Actor	Triumph in the Skies II — "Ko Chi-wang (Roy)"	Nominated	
2014	Best Actor	Ghost Dragon of Cold Mountain — "Chu Cheung-shing"	Nominated	
2014	Most Popular Male Character	Ghost Dragon of Cold Mountain — "Chu Cheung-shing"	Nominated	
2015	Best Actor	Lord of Shanghai — "Kiu Ngo-tin (young)"	Nominated	
2015	Most Popular Male Character	Lord of Shanghai — "Kiu Ngo-tin (young)"	Top 5	
2016	Best Actor	Inspector Gourmet — "Yeung Tak-kei"	Nominated	
2017	Best Actor	The Exorcist's Meter — "Ma Kwai"	Top 5	
2017	Most Popular Male Character	The Exorcist's Meter — "Ma Kwai"	Won	
2017	Most Popular Onscreen Partnership	The Exorcist's Meter (with Hubert Wu)	Nominated	
2017	Best Show Host	DoDo Goes Shopping sr 2	Won	
2017	Most Popular Theme Song	Love from Heart (with Niki Chow)	Nominated	
2018	Best Actor	Deep in the Realm of Conscience — "Yam Sam-shu"	Top 5	
2018	Most Popular Male Character	Deep in the Realm of Conscience — "Yam Sam-shu"	Won	
2018	Favourite TVB Actor in Singapore	Deep in the Realm of Conscience — "Yam Sam-shu"	Top 3	
2018	Favourite TVB Actor in Malaysia	Deep in the Realm of Conscience — "Yam Sam-shu"	Nominated	
2019	Best Actor	Big White Duel — "Tong Ming"	Won	
2019	Most Popular Male Character	Big White Duel — "Tong Ming"	Top 5	
2019	Most Popular Onscreen Partnership	Big White Duel (with Roger Kwok)	Nominated	
2020	Best Actor	Line Walker: Bull Fight — "Wai Chok-wing / Ngai Tak-lai (Klein)"	Top 5	
2020	Most Popular Male Character	Line Walker: Bull Fight — "Wai Chok-wing / Ngai Tak-lai (Klein)"	Nominated	
2020	Favourite TVB Actor in Malaysia	Line Walker: Bull Fight — "Wai Chok-wing / Ngai Tak-lai (Klein)"	Nominated	
2020	Most Popular Onscreen Partnership	The Exorcist’s 2nd Meter (with Hubert Wu)	Nominated	
2021	Best Actor	Plan “B” — "Yau Choi-shan"	Nominated	
2021	Best Actor	Kids' Lives Matter — "Fong Chung-yan (Amos)"	Top 5	
2021	Most Popular Male Character	Plan “B” — "Yau Choi-shan"	Nominated	
2021	Most Popular Male Character	Kids' Lives Matter — "Fong Chung-yan (Amos)"	Won	
2021	Favourite TVB Actor in Malaysia	Plan “B” — "Yau Choi-shan"	Nominated	
2021	Favourite TVB Actor in Malaysia	Kids' Lives Matter — "Fong Chung-yan (Amos)"	Nominated	
2021	Most Popular Onscreen Partnership	Plan “B” (with Eliza Sam)	Nominated	
2021	Most Popular Onscreen Partnership	Kids' Lives Matter (with Catherine Chau)	Nominated	
2022	Best Actor	Big White Duel II — "Tong Ming"	Top 5	
2022	Most Popular Male Character	Big White Duel II — "Tong Ming"	Top 10	
2022	Favourite TVB Actor in Malaysia	Big White Duel II — "Tong Ming"	Top 5	
2022	Most Popular Onscreen Partnership	Big White Duel (with Nancy Wu and Natalie Tong)	Nominated	
2023	Best Actor	The Invisibles — "Kan Yiu-yeung (Ocean)"	Nominated	
2023	Best Actor	Speakers of Law — "Kam Bing-shun"	Nominated	
2023	Best Actor	The QUEEN of News — "Leung King-yan (George)"	Top 5	
2023	Favourite TVB Actor in Greater Bay Area	The QUEEN of News — "Leung King-yan (George)"	Top 5	
2023	Favourite TVB Actor in Malaysia	Speakers of Law — "Kam Bing-shun"	Nominated	
2023	Favourite TVB Actor in Malaysia	The QUEEN of News — "Leung King-yan (George)"	Won	

=== TVB Star Awards Malaysia ===
Ma has won eight awards at the TVB Star Awards Malaysia (known as the My Astro On Demand Favourites Awards for a time) between 2010 and 2014.

My Astro on Demand Favourites Awards
Year	Category	Drama / Role	Result	Ref.
2010	My Favourite TV Actor	A Fistful of Stances — "Koo Yu-tong"	Nominated	
2010	My Favourite Top 15 TV Characters	A Fistful of Stances — "Koo Yu-tong"	Won	
2011	My Favourite Top 15 TV Characters	The Life and Times of a Sentinel — "Fuk-chuen"	Won	
2012	My Favourite TV Actor	The Hippocratic Crush — "Cheung Yat-kin"	Won	
2012	My Favourite Top 15 TV Characters	The Hippocratic Crush — "Cheung Yat-kin"	Won	
2012	My Favourite Onscreen Couple	The Hippocratic Crush (with Tavia Yeung)	Won	

TVB Star Awards Malaysia
Year	Category	Drama / Role	Result	Ref.
2013	Favourite TVB Actor	The Hippocratic Crush II — "Cheung Yat-kin"	Top 3	
2013	Top 15 Favourite TVB Drama Characters	The Hippocratic Crush II — "Cheung Yat-kin"	Won	
2013	Favourite TVB Onscreen Couple	The Hippocratic Crush II (with Tavia Yeung)	Won	
2014	Favourite TVB Actor	Ghost Dragon of Cold Mountain — "Chu Cheung-shing"	Nominated	
2014	Top 15 Favourite TVB Drama Characters	Ghost Dragon of Cold Mountain — "Chu Cheung-shing"	Won	
2016	Favourite TVB Actor	Inspector Gourmet — "Yeung Tak-kei"	Nominated	
2016	Top 15 Favourite TVB Drama Characters	Inspector Gourmet — "Yeung Tak-kei"	Nominated	
2017	Favourite TVB Actor	My Dearly Sinful Mind — "Chung Tai-yin (TY)"	Nominated	
2017	Top 17 Favourite TVB Drama Characters	My Dearly Sinful Mind — "Chung Tai-yin (TY)"	Nominated	

=== StarHub TVB Awards ===
Ma has won seven awards between 2012 and 2017 at the Starhub TVB Awards.

Year	Category	Drama / Role	Result	Ref.
2012	My Favourite TVB Male TV Characters	The Hippocratic Crush — "Cheung Yat-kin"	Won	
2013	My Favourite TVB Male TV Characters	Three Kingdoms RPG — "Szema Shun (Vincent)"	Won	
2014	My Favourite TVB Male TV Characters	Ghost Dragon of Cold Mountain — "Chu Cheung-shing"	Won	
2015	My Favourite TVB Male TV Characters	Noblesse Oblige — "To Chun-fung"	Won	
2016	My Favourite TVB Male TV Characters	Lord of Shanghai — "Kiu Ngo-tin (young)"	Won	
2017	My Favourite TVB Actor	My Dearly Sinful Mind — "Chung Tai-yin (TY)"	Nominated	
2017	My Favourite TVB Male TV Characters	My Dearly Sinful Mind — "Chung Tai-yin (TY)"	Won	
2017	My Favourite TVB Onscreen Couple	Bet Hur (with Charmaine Sheh)	Won	

=== Next TV Awards ===
Year	Category	Result	Ref.
2012	Top 10 Television Artiste	Ranked 7th	
2013	Top 10 Television Artiste	Ranked 2nd	

=== Yahoo Asia Buzz Awards ===
Year	Category	Drama / Role	Result	Ref.
2017	Popular TV Male Character	The Exorcist's Meter — "Ma Kwai"	Won	
2020	Television Male Artiste	—N/a	Won	

=== People's Choice Television Awards ===
Year	Category	Drama / Role	Result	Ref.
2017	People’s Choice Best Actor	The Exorcist's Meter — "Ma Kwai"	Won	
2017	People’s Choice Best TV Drama Partnership	The Exorcist's Meter (with Hubert Wu)	Won	
2017	People’s Choice Best Variety Show Host	DoDo Goes Shopping sr 2	Won	
2018	People’s Choice Best Actor	Deep in the Realm of Conscience — "Yam Sam-shu"	Top 5 (Ranked 4th)	
2019	People’s Choice Best Actor	Big White Duel — "Tong Ming"	Top 5 (Ranked 2nd)	
2021	People’s Choice Best Actor	Kids' Lives Matter — "Fong Chung-yan (Amos)"	Top 5 (Ranked 5th)	
2021	People’s Choice Best TV Drama Partnership	Kids' Lives Matter (with Kevin Cheng and Linda Chung)	Top 10 (Ranked 6th)	
2021	People’s Choice Best TV Drama Partnership	Kids' Lives Matter (with Catherine Chau)	Nominated	

=== Other awards ===
Year	Award	Category	Drama	Result	Ref.
2012	Hong Kong Performing Artistes Guild Awards	Outstanding Television Performance Actor	—N/a	Won	
2013	TVB Anniversary Gala Vote by Artistes	Best Actor	The Hippocratic Crush II — "Cheung Yat-kin"	Won	
2017	Weibo Star Awards	Weibo Awesome TV Actor	The Exorcist's Meter — "Ma Kwai"	Won	
2017	Hong Kong Television Awards	Best Leading Actor in Drama Series	The Exorcist's Meter — "Ma Kwai"	Won	
2019	StarHub Night of Star	Best TVB Male Artiste	Big White Duel — "Tong Ming"	Won	
