= Knowings =

Knowings is a surname. Notable people with the surname include:

- Chris Knowings (born 1980), American actor
- Christy Knowings (born 1980), American actress and comedian

== See also ==
- Knowing (disambiguation)
