= The Exorcist's 2nd Meter =

2020 Hong Kong TV series

- 降魔的2.0
- Genre: Supernatural
- Created by: Dave Fong Chun-chiu
- Written by: Ruby Law Pui-ching
- Starring: Kenneth Ma; Mandy Wong; Hubert Wu; Moon Lau; Gloria Tang; Zoie Tam; C-Kwan; Ram Chiang; Susan Tse; Iris Lam; Kayee Tam; Willie Wai; Hugo Wong; Alex Mak; Julian Gaertner
- Opening theme: Crossroads (十字路口) by Hubert Wu
- Ending theme: I Can’t Forget About You (我未能忘掉你) by Hana Kuk; Mortals Don’t Know About Love (凡人不懂愛) by Hubert Wu; There Is Love (原來有愛) by Kayee Tam
- Composers: Alan Cheung Ka-shing; Lowell Lo Kwun-ting; Hubert Wu
- Country of origin: Hong Kong
- Original languages: Cantonese; Mandarin
- No. of episodes: 25

Production
- Producer: Dave Fong Chun-chiu
- Production location: Hong Kong
- Camera setup: Multi camera
- Running time: 45 minutes (per episode)
- Production company: TVB

Original release
- Network: TVB Jade
- Release: 4 May – 5 June 2020

Related
- The Exorcist's Meter

The Exorcist's 2nd Meter, also known as The Exorcist's Meter 2.0, is a 2020 Hong Kong supernatural television drama produced by Television Broadcasts Limited (TVB). Serving as the second season to 2017's The Exorcist's Meter, Kenneth Ma, Mandy Wong and Moon Lau return to reprise their roles, while Hubert Wu portrays an entirely new character.

== Synopsis ==
Sometime after the events of the first season, Ma Kwai the taxi driver has fully devoted himself in honoring Shek Kam Dong's destiny as an exorcist. Choosing to embrace his destiny, Ma is forced to choose between family and exorcism after he encounters the spirit of his childhood friend Mok Wai Ho, who comes to him facing a mysterious threat.

== Production ==
A costume fitting press conference was held on 3 January 2019. The filming lasted from January to May 2019.

== Cast and characters ==
=== Main Leads ===
- Kenneth Ma as Ma Kwai (馬季), better known as Siu Ma / Ma (小馬), a taxi driver who became an exorcist to carry on Shek Kam Dong's legacy. He had been burdened with the sin of killing Kwok Chin Ming and carried the guilt of the deaths of Ho and Bella. As a result of being cursed by Salvia, he suppressed his feelings for Chong Tsz Yeuk and avoided Chong to protect her from the supernatural dangers he faces. When Ho returned, he worked to reunite his family.
- Mandy Wong as Dr. Chong Tsz Yeuk (莊芷若), an emergency room doctor. Knowing that Ma deliberately avoided her, she attempted to understand him through the spiritual world by seeking help from Fung Sze Ye, and unlocked her ability to telepathically communicate with ghosts.
  - Wong also portrays the devil Salvia. Although she had been wiped out by Ma in the first season, she still appeared in Ma's mind, which reminded Ma of the curse she placed on him.
- Hubert Wu as Mok Wai Ho (莫偉豪), better known as Ho (豪仔), Ma's childhood friend who had drowned to death while trying to save him. At his death, he was trapped in the water. He was deceived and cursed by Thalassa, who transformed him into a Rakshasa in exchange for leaving the water. Since then, he had faced countless ruthless experiences, which turned him into a cynical ghost.
  - Wu also portrays Shek Kam Dong (石敢當), a 3000-year-old stone spirit who sacrificed himself for Ma to wipe out Salvia. He appears only in Ma's memories and imagination, continuing to act as Ma's mentor.

=== Major Supporting Cast ===
- Moon Lau as Bella Bui Bui Na (貝貝娜), better known as Bear (啤啤), who was killed by Salvia in the previous season. After becoming a ghost, she positively faced her death and becomes a popular KOL in the spiritual world. However, she faced an internal struggle between staying in the mortal world and passing on, and her lingering desire to stay by Ma's side had almost turned her into an avenging ghost.
- Gloria Tang as Liz Sze Loi Sze (施萊斯), a rich exorcist and Ross’ twin sister. Nine years ago, she contracted a deal with the demon Mephi to save her Ross's life, in exchange for her soul in 10 years time.
- Zoie Tam as Fa (阿花), a drunk woman who was a regular taxi passenger of Ma. She was ultimately revealed to be the Sea Demon, Thalassa.
  - Tam also portrays Wan Ying (允瑩), the late wife of an ancient exorcist from 700 years ago, Tin Yu. After Tin Yu died in the hands of mortals, Wan Ying also committed suicide. Her appearance was later used by Thalassa, an action which she claimed is a reminder to the modern reincarnation of Tin-yu to remember her.
- C-Kwan as Fung Sze Ye (風獅爺), a 3000-year-old stone spirit who acted as Chong's guardian.
- Ram Chiang as Ngai Tit Man (艾鐵文), a genius scientist who worked for Liz and Ross. He was a friend of Mok Yau Wai, Leung Ching Ching's deceased brother.
  - Chiang also portrays Yip Hok Ming (葉學明) and Kei Yan (祁仁), Mok and Ngai's friend.
- Susan Tse as Leung Ching Ching (梁晶晶), a superstitious massagist. She was Ho's birth mother and Ma's foster mother.

also portrays Yip Hok Ming sister

=== Other characters ===
- Iris Lam as Cheung Pui Ling (張佩玲), better known as Ling, who was pregnant with Kwok's child and wished to seek revenge on Ma upon Kwok's death.
- Kayee Tam as Lily (莉莉), a spirit residing in a doll owned by Bear and Bear's good friend.
- Willie Wai as Chan Wing Lim (陳永廉), better known as Officer Do (嘟嘟Sir), a Senior Superintendent of Police of the District Crime Squad. He sought help from Ma upon encountering cases related to supernatural beings.
- Hugo Wong as Kwok Chin Ming (郭展明), Ling's decreased boyfriend. After his death in the first season, Ling "resurrected" him with Billy's help, but was ultimately defeated.
- Alex Mak as Ross Sze Lo Sze (施勞斯), a rich exorcist and Liz's twin brother.
- Julian Benedikt Gaertner as Billy (比利), a demon of lies who originated from an ancient counterfeit painting. He formed a contract with Ling and helps her to "resurrect" Kwok. After Ling's defeat, Ma "adopted" Billy as a servant demon.

=== Guest appearance ===
- Tracy Chu as Ma's taxi passenger. (Episode 5)
- Law Lan as Grandma Lung (龍婆), a psychic. (Episode 10, 25)
- Mandy Lam as Ivy Yip Pui Mei (葉佩薇), a television news broadcaster and Bear's idol. (Episode 12)
- Tsui Wing as Tony Tsui Tung Yin (徐東然), a television news broadcaster and Ivy's protege. He had a crush on Ivy and joined her station in order to get close to her. (Episode 12)
- Kaman Kong as Kaka (嘉嘉), a blind girl. She was the first person to accept Ho for who he was, but his demonic instinct ultimately took her life and filled Ho with regret. (Episode 13, 15, 23 - 24)
- Joey Law as Tin Yu (天宇), an ancient exorcist and mortal enemy of Thalassa. (Episode 15, 17, 19, 21 - 22 and 24)
- Mat Yeung as Moses, a barista who worked at a coffee shop near Bear's high school. He faced the closure of his cafe after the death of his late girlfriend. (Episode 19 - 20)
- Jeannie Chan as Jeannie, Moses' late girlfriend who became a ghost and lingers around the cafe. (Episode 19 - 20)
- Lau Kong as Kwok Wing Sing (郭永城), Kwok's deceased father. (Episode 25)

== Viewership ratings ==
The following is a table that includes a list of the total ratings points based on television viewership. "Viewers in millions" refers to the number of people, derived from TVB Jade ratings in Hong Kong who watched the episode live and on myTV SUPER.

| # | Week | Episode(s) | Avg. points | Peak points | Ref. |
|---|---|---|---|---|---|
| 1 | 4 — 8 May 2020 | 1 — 5 | 29.9 | 32.1 | |
| 2 | 11 — 15 May 2020 | 6 — 10 | 28.9 | 30.4 | |
| 3 | 18 — 22 May 2020 | 11 — 15 | 28.6 | 29.9 | |
| 4 | 25 — 29 May 2020 | 16 — 20 | 28.3 | 29.6 | |
| 5 | 1 — 5 June 2020 | 21 — 25 | 29.3 | 31.4 | |

== Awards and nominations ==
=== TVB Anniversary Awards 2020 ===
| Category | Nominee | Result |
|---|---|---|
| Best Drama | The Exorcist’s 2nd Meter | Nominated |
| Best Actor | Hubert Wu | Nominated |
| Most Popular Male Character | Hubert Wu as "Mok Wai-ho" | Nominated (Top 5) |
| Most Popular Female Character | Zoie Tam as "Thalassa" | Nominated |
| Best Supporting Actor | Ram Chiang | Nominated |
| Best Supporting Actress | Moon Lau | Nominated |
| Best Supporting Actress | Zoie Tam | Nominated |
| Most Improved Male Artiste | Joey Law | Nominated (Top 5) |
| Most Improved Female Artiste | Moon Lau | Nominated (Top 5) |
| Most Improved Female Artiste | Gloria Tang | Nominated (Top 5) |
| Most Improved Female Artiste | Iris Lam | Nominated (Top 5) |
| Most Popular Onscreen Partnership | Kenneth Ma and Hubert Wu | Nominated |
| Most Popular Drama Theme Song | Crossroads by Hubert Wu | Nominated |
| Most Popular Drama Theme Song | I Can’t Forget About You by Hana Kuk | Nominated |
| Most Popular Drama Theme Song | Mortals Don’t Know About Love by Hubert Wu | Won |
| Most Popular Drama Theme Song | There Is Love by Kayee Tam | Nominated |
| Favourite Drama in Malaysia | The Exorcist’s 2nd Meter | Nominated (Top 5) |
| Favourite TVB Actor in Malaysia | Hubert Wu as "Mok Wai-ho" | Nominated |

=== hk01 Television Drama Awards ===
| Category | Drama / Role | Result |
|---|---|---|
| Best Actress | Mandy Wong as "Chong Tsz-yeuk" | Won |
