= Ram Chiang =

Hong Kong actor and singer

- 蔣志光
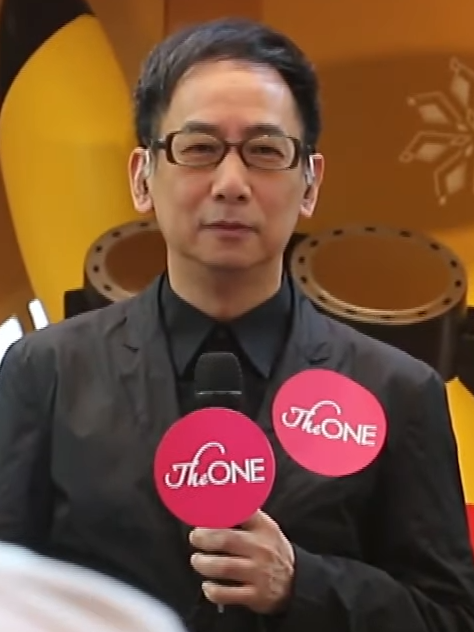
- Chiang in 2014
- Born: 2 July 1961 (age 65); British Hong Kong
- Occupations: Actor; singer; composer
- Years active: 1981–present
- Awards: TVB Anniversary Awards – Best Supporting Actor; 2014 Come On, Cousin; Professional Actor Award; 2014

Chinese name
- Traditional Chinese: 蔣志光
- Simplified Chinese: 蒋志光
Transcriptions
Standard Mandarin
- Hanyu Pinyin: Jiǎng Zhì Guāng
Yue: Cantonese
- Jyutping: Zoeng2 Zi3 Gwong1
- Website: Official TVB profile

Signature
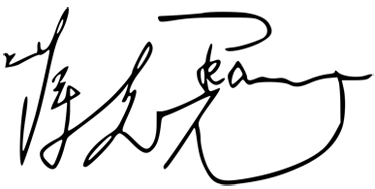

Ram Chiang Chi-kwong (born 2 July 1961), also known professionally by his English name Ram, is a Hong Kong actor and former singer-composer, currently under Television Broadcasts Limited (TVB) management. A versatile actor who is most recognized for his many supporting roles in TVB dramas, Chiang was awarded the "TVB Professional Actor Award" in 2014 for his many years as a dedicated TVB employee. He also won the TVB Anniversary Award for Best Supporting Actor with his role in the 2014 drama Come On, Cousin.

== Career ==
Ram Chiang started out singing cover songs of other artistes before he was invited by George Lam, one of the singers he imitated, to perform alongside him on stage in 1985. During the concert, George Lam gave him the English name "Ram" as opposed to George's "Lam", since "L" and "R" together make stereo sound. After this, Chiang was signed to Polydor Records in 1985. He became well known for performing classic 90s Hong Kong pop songs such as "You Needn’t Be Acquaintances to Meet with Each Other" (相逢何必曾相識, a duet with Rita Carpio), and "Queen's Road East" (皇后大道東, a collaboration with Lo Ta-yu).

After becoming disenchanted with the Hong Kong music industry, Chiang decided to quit being a singer in the early 1990s and signed with TVB to become an actor. He mostly played supporting roles. In 2014, his popularity skyrocketed when Wong Cho-lam wrote a role tailor-made for Chiang when he was cast as Ko Yam (高音), a talented washed up musician with a tragic past in the comedy Come On, Cousin. The role won him the "2014 Best Supporting Actor" award at TVB's annual anniversary awards and saw a resurgence in his singing career.

== Personal life ==
Chiang is married and has a son. He is a private person and does not talk about his family much.

Being a devout Christian, Chiang does not attend the blessing ceremonies of any projects he works on, as ceremonies involve Taoist and Chinese folk rituals. It is an industry standard in Hong Kong for the filming cast and crew to offer incense to the gods to ask for their blessings of safety and smooth production during filming.

== Discography ==
- 拯救行動 (1987) — EP
- Meeting/Going (相逢/走; 1990) — Cantonese album
- 相逢何必曾相識-未來的語言 (1990) — Mandarin album
- Cheung Chi Kwong and his Friends (蔣志光與他的朋友; 1992) — Cantonese album
- Passage to Music (創作路; 1993) — Cantonese album
- 多情多寂寞 (1993) — Mandarin album
- Legendary Voices (傳奇巨聲, 2014) — Compilation album with Rita Carpio

== Filmography ==
=== Television dramas ===
Year	English Title	Chinese Title	Role	Notes
1991	Heartbreak Blues	與郎共舞	Song Tak-ming 宋德明	
1992	Wong Fei Hong Returns	我愛牙擦蘇	Lam Sai-wing 林世榮	
1993	File of Justice II	壹號皇庭II	Eric Chow Siu-chung 周少聰	
1994	Glittering Moments	CATWALK俏佳人	Lung Koon-bil 龍冠標	
1994	File of Justice III	壹號皇庭III	Eric Chow Siu-chung 周少聰	
1995	Hand of Hope	邊緣故事	Law Gum-chun 羅錦全	
1995	Detective Investigation Files	刑事偵緝檔案	Wong Wai-on 王維安	
1995	Detective Investigation Files II	刑事偵緝檔案II	Wong Wai-on 王維安	
1995	A Kindred Spirit (1995-1999)	真情	Lee Tim-fook 李添福	
1995	File of Justice IV	壹號皇庭IV	Eric Chow Siu-chung 周少聰	
1995	Cold Blood Warm Heart	天地男兒	Hui Yuen-kwong 許遠光	
1997	File of Justice V	壹號皇庭V	Eric Chow Siu-chung 周少聰	
1997	A Recipe for the Heart	美味天王	Lee Tim-fook 李添福 (Cameo)	character from A Kindred Spirit
1997	Mystery Files	迷離檔案	Lee Chi-kin 李子建	
2000	The Green Hope	新鮮人	D.Y.	
2000	War of the Genders	男親女愛	James Jim Si-on 詹士安	
2002	Legal Entanglement	法網伊人	Kan Wing-lim 簡永廉	Nominated – TVB Anniversary Award for My Favourite Television Roles of the Year
2002	A Case of Misadventure	騎呢大狀	Ng Sam-sing 吳三省	Nominated – TVB Anniversary Award for Most Improved Male Artist; Nominated – TVB Anniversary Award for My Favourite Television Roles of the Year
2002	Burning Flame II	烈火雄心II	Leung Man-gong 梁孟功	Nominated – TVB Anniversary Award for My Favourite Television Roles of the Year
2002	Let's Face It	無考不成冤家	QK	
2003	Ups and Downs in the Sea of Love	十萬噸情緣	NG Siu-keung 吳小強	Nominated – TVB Anniversary Award for My Favourite Television Roles of the Year
2003	Seed of Hope	俗世情真	Wu Guan-jak 胡貫澤	Nominated – TVB Anniversary Award for My Favourite Television Roles of the Year
2003	Life Begins At Forty	花樣中年	Lo Ga-fai 羅家輝	Nominated – TVB Anniversary Award for Best Actor; Nominated – TVB Anniversary Award for My Favourite On-Screen Partners
2003	The King of Yesterday and Tomorrow	九五至尊	Brian Shum Yat-chung 岑日忠	
2004	Angels of Mission	無名天使3D	Lee Chin-jun 李前進	
2004	To Get Unstuck in Time	隔世追兇	Ng Wai-fung 伍偉峰	Nominated – TVB Anniversary Award for My Favourite Television Roles of the Year
2004	ICAC Investigators 2004	廉政行動2004	Chow Bing-chung 周秉中	
2004	To Catch the Uncatchable	棟篤神探	Si Gou-but 史高拔	Nominated – TVB Anniversary Award for My Favourite Television Roles of the Year
2004	The Conqueror's Story	楚漢驕雄	Cheung Leung 張良	Nominated – TVB Anniversary Award for My Favourite Television Roles of the Year
2005	The Zone	奇幻潮	Joe	
2005	The Prince's Shadow	御用閒人	Yeung Koo 楊古	Nominated – TVB Anniversary Award for Best Supporting Actor
2005	Healing Hands III	妙手仁心III	Gum Ho-man 甘浩文	Nominated – TVB Anniversary Award for Best Supporting Actor
2005	The Charm Beneath	胭脂水粉	Lai Kwok-cheung 黎國昌	Nominated – TVB Anniversary Award for Best Supporting Actor
2005	Women on the Run	窈窕熟女	Muk sir 沐sir	
2006	Safe Guards	鐵血保鏢	Sheung Ching-man 尚正文	Nominated – TVB Anniversary Award for Best Supporting Actor; Nominated – 2007 Astro Drama Awards for My Favourite Show Stealer Cast
2006	Love Guaranteed	愛情全保	Hoh Cheung-dok 賀長鐸	
2006	Maidens' Vow	鳳凰四重奏	Mo Yung-chiu 慕容超	
2006	Welcome to the House	高朋滿座	So Gan 蘇根	
2006	To Grow with Love	肥田囍事	Albert Dai Fu 戴富	
2007	ICAC Investigators 2007	廉政行動2007	Wu Gwok-keung 胡國強	
2007	The Ultimate Crime Fighter	通天幹探	Chow Chi-cheung 周志昌	
2008	Forensic Heroes II	法證先鋒II	Mok Kiu-fung 莫喬豐 (Cameo)	
2008	The Four	少年四大名捕	Shu Mo-hei 舒無戲	
2008-2009	The Gem of Life	珠光寶氣	Patrick Yeung Chi-kau 楊志球	
2009	Sweetness in the Salt	碧血鹽梟	Yiu Sau-Ching 姚守正	
2009	Man in Charge	幕後大老爺	Bak Yuk-long 白玉郎	
2009	Just Love II	老婆大人II	Lok Joi-san 樂在山	
2009	Beyond the Realm of Conscience	宮心計	Bo Kat-cheung 布吉祥	Nominated – TVB Anniversary Award for Best Supporting Actor
2009-2010	A Watchdog's Tale	老友狗狗	Chow Yung Fat 周用發	
2010	Cupid Stupid	戀愛星求人	Greeny Yip Sheung Mao 葉常茂	
2010	Don Juan DeMercado	情人眼裏高一D	Judge 評判	
2010	In the Eye of the Beholder	秋香怒點唐伯虎	Ho Hoi-ching 何海清	
2010	A Fistful of Stances	鐵馬尋橋	Leung Cham 梁湛	
2010	The Mysteries of Love	談情說案	Ging Fong 景方 (Cameo)	
2010	Can't Buy Me Love	公主嫁到	Lo Tou-yun 羅道遠	
2010	Twilight Investigation	囧探查過界	Mok Chun-chung 莫鎮忠	
2011	A Great Way to Care	仁心解碼	Dr. Sam C.S. Lin Chi-sum 連志森	Nominated – TVB Anniversary Award for Best Supporting Actor
2011	Grace Under Fire	女拳	Ho Tim-fuk 何添福	
2011	Yes, Sir. Sorry, Sir!	點解阿Sir係阿Sir	Poon Kwok-shing 潘國誠	
2011	Forensic Heroes III	法證先鋒III	Paul Yau Kin-bo 游健保	
2012	Wish and Switch	換樂無窮	Fan Tai-kit 范泰傑	
2012	Daddy Good Deeds	當旺爸爸	Fishmonger Sing 賣魚勝 (Cameo)	
2012	Master of Play	心戰	Chong Jan-tou 莊鎮滔	
2012	Witness Insecurity	護花危情	Kiu Gong Ho 喬江河	Nominated – TVB Anniversary Award for Best Supporting Actor
2012	Three Kingdoms RPG	回到三國	Sun Yuk 荀彧	
2012	Highs and Lows	雷霆掃毒	Bei Kwan 跛坤	
2012-2013	Missing You	幸福摩天輪	Lo Man-kit 魯文迪	
2013	Cupid Stupid	戀愛星求人	Greeny Yip Sheung-mao 葉常茂	
2013	Reality Check	心路GPS	Mr. Tsui 徐生	
2013	A Great Way to Care II	仁心解碼II	Dr. Sam C.S. Lin Chi-sum 連志森	
2013	Slow Boat Home	情越海岸線	Yip Hok-ming 葉學明	
2013	Always and Ever	情逆三世缘	Advisor Gong-sun/Kung-sun 公孫策/孫公略	
2014	Come Home Love	愛·回家	Tong San 唐山 (Cameo)	
2014	Gilded Chopsticks	食為奴	Wu Si-to 鄔思道	
2014	ICAC Investigators 2014	廉政行動2014	Ho Gwok-fai 何國輝	
2014	Ghost Dragon of Cold Mountain	寒山潛龍	Emperor Chui Juk-hei 皇上趙旭熹	
2014	Rear Mirror	載得有情人	Yue Dai-chi 余大智	
2014	Tomorrow Is Another Day	再戰明天	Cheng On-dik 鄭安迪	
2014	Come On, Cousin	老表，你好hea！	Ko Yam 高音	TVB Anniversary Award for Best Supporting Actor; Nominated – TVB Star Awards Malaysia for My Favourite TVB Actor in a Supporting Role; Nominated – 2015 StarHub TVB Awards for My Favourite TVB Actor
2014-2015	Noblesse Oblige	宦海奇官	Prince Yu 裕親王	
2015	Raising the Bar	四個女仔三個BAR	Woody Lam Sam-muk 林森木	Nominated – TVB Anniversary Award for Best Supporting Actor; Nominated – TVB Star Awards Malaysia for My Favourite TVB Actor in a Supporting Role
2015	Ghost of Relativity	鬼同你OT	Ngai Tit-man 艾鐵文	
2015	Captain of Destiny	張保仔	Suen Sau-choi 孫秀才	
2015	Angel In-the-Making	實習天使	Nasa Kei Yan 祁仁	
2016	Short End of the Stick	公公出宮	Yip Ching-yee 葉正義	
2016	Law dis-Order	律政強人	Michael Yip Ho-tin 葉浩天	
2016	My Lover from the Planet Meow	來自喵喵星的妳	Si Ko-but Sir 史高拔	
2017	Recipes To Live By	味想天開	Ting Yat / Mok Fat-choi 丁日 / 莫發財	
2017	A General, A Scholar and A Eunuch	超時空男臣	Security Team Leader	
2017	Oh My Grad	老表，畢業喇！	Ching Long 程郎	Nominated – TVB Star Awards Malaysia for My Favourite TVB Actor in a Supporting Role
2017	The Exorcist's Meter	降魔的	Mok Yau-wai / Yip Hok-ming / Kei Yan / Ngai Tit-man 莫有為 / 葉學明 / 祁仁 / 艾鐵文	Nominated – TVB Anniversary Award for Best Supporting Actor
2017	Heart and Greed	溏心風暴3	Chan Chi-ming 陳志明	
2019	Big White Duel	白色強人	Dr. Samuel Yu Cham-sum 余湛琛	Nominated – TVB Anniversary Award for Best Supporting Actor
2019	Finding Her Voice	牛下女高音	Chan Lee-cheung 陳理璋	
2019	The Man Who Kills Trouble	解決師	Principal Yu 余校長	
2020	The Exorcist's 2nd Meter	降魔的2.0	Ngai Tit-man / Mok Yau-wai / Yip Hok-ming / Kei Yan 艾鐵文 / 莫有為 / 葉學明 / 祁仁	
2021	The Runner	大步走	Mircale Kwok Wong-po 郭皇普	
2021	AI Romantic	智能愛人	Koo Hok-lai 古學禮	Nominated – TVB Anniversary Award for Best Supporting Actor; Nominated – TVB Anniversary Award for Most Popular Male Character Nominated - People’s Choice for Best TV Drama Partnership (with Luk Wing, Mayanne Mak, Angelina Lo)
2022	Story of Zom-B	食腦喪B	Yu Cheung-kim 余祥劍	
2022	Big White Duel 2	白色強人II	Dr. Yu Cham-sum 余湛琛	
2023	Narcotics Heroes	破毒強人	Cheng Fuk-tin 鄭福田	
TBA	OPM	OPM	Cheung Sai-man (Simon Sir/Thinking Sir) / Ho Tak-shun 張世民 / 何德信	

=== Films ===
Year	English title	Chinese title	Character
1981	Hired Guns	凶蠍	Film extra
1989	Forever Young	返老還童	Tourist Guide Lung
1989	Little Cop	小小小警察	Singing policeman at funeral
1991	Scheming Wonders	賊聖	Virgin Kwong
1992	Fight Back to School II	逃學威龍2	Math teacher
1994	The Other Side of Romance	花月危情	
1994	Drunken Master II	醉拳二	Tso
1995	Midnight Caller	狼吻夜驚魂	Chow San-yuk
1996	The Age of Miracles	麻麻帆帆	Farmer
2000	Model from Hell	鬼名模	Dan
2006	McDull, the Alumni	春田花花同學會	Junior doctor
2007	Whispers and Moans	性工作者十日談	Ray
2008	L for Love L for Lies	我的最愛	Bobo's father
2010	72 Tenants of Prosperity	七十二家房客	1970s policeman
2011	I Love Hong Kong	我愛HK開心萬歲	Broker Chan 1987
2011	Turning Point 2	Laughing Gor之潛罪犯	CSD Officer Sing
2014	Temporary Family	失戀急讓	Wilson
2015	Love Detective	沒女神探	To Kei-fung
2016	Cold War 2	寒戰2	David Mok
2021	Anita	梅艳芳	Recording Studio producer
