= The Butterfly Lovers (album) =

Studio album by Hubert Wu
- Released: 2 October 2013
- Recorded: 2012–2013
- Genre: Cantopop
- Length: 36:16
- Label: Stars Shine International
- Producer: see Tracklist

Hubert Wu chronology
Couple Getaway (2012)	The Butterfly Lovers (2013)	Knowing (2015)

The Butterfly Lovers is the second studio album by Hong Kong singer Hubert Wu. It was released on 2 October 2013 via Stars Shine International. The album was available for pre-order on 20 September 2012.

== Track listing ==
CD
No.	Title	Lyrics	Music	Length
1.	"The Butterfly Lovers"	Wyman Wong	Denise Ho	4:13
2.	"Thank You"	Josh	Hubert Wu	4:10
3.	"Crush" (ft.Jinny Ng)	Sandy Chang	彭學斌	4:29
4.	"Enlightenment"	黃厚霖	Yip Siu Chung	3:07
5.	"After That"	Gene Lau	Linda Chung	4:09
6.	"Tomorrow"	Josh	陳珀	3:59
7.	"Time Is Everything" (ft.Linda Chung)	黃厚霖	Yip Siu Chung	3:37
8.	"Silence Is Gold"	Gene Lau; Kitson	Kitson	4:17
9.	"Rescue Me" (ft.Jinny Ng)	張翹楚; Brian Tsang	Ronald Ng	4:12
Total length:				36:16

DVD
No.	Title	Length
1.	"The Butterfly Lovers"
2.	"Crush" (ft.Jinny Ng)

== Edition ==
- CD+DVD

== Music videos ==
Song	Director	Date
Jinny Ng & Hubert Wu – Crush on YouTube	Jacky @ Concept X	21 July 2013
Hubert Wu – The Butterfly Lovers on YouTube	Jacky @ Concept X	23 September 2013
Hubert Wu – Enlightenment on YouTube	Jacky @ Concept X	23 October 2013

== Chart performance ==
Peak Position
Moov	kkbox (Daily Chart)	kkbox (Weekly Chart)	kkbox (Monthly Chart)
4	1	1	1

=== Singles ===
==== Hong Kong ====
Year	Track	Peak Position			
Year	Track	903	RTHK	997	TVB
2012	Tomorrow	16	–	–	–
2013	Crush	–	–	3	2
2013	The Butterfly Lovers	–	1	2	1
2013	Enlightenment	–	12	4	6

=== Other charts ===
Song	Peak Position			
Song	Moov	kkbox (Daily Chart)	kkbox (Weekly Chart)	kkbox (Monthly Chart)
The Butterfly Lovers	7	1	1	1
Enlightenment	36	7	7	11
Thank You	50	51	54	59
Tomorrow	95	53	63	74
Time Is Everything	77	62	73	87
Crush	63	26	29	34
After That	73	–	–	–
Rescue Me	–	86	88	–
