= Knowing Me, Knowing You (disambiguation) =

"Knowing Me, Knowing You" is a 1977 song by ABBA.

Knowing Me, Knowing You may also refer to:

- Knowing Me, Knowing You (album), a 2002 compilation album of ABBA cover versions
- Knowing Me Knowing You with Alan Partridge (radio series), a BBC Radio 4 series named after the song
- Knowing Me Knowing You with Alan Partridge (TV series), a BBC Television series named after the song
