= Couple Getaway =

Studio album by Hubert Wu
- Released: 14 September 2012; 6 February 2013（Dual Edition（Live +））
- Recorded: 2011–2012
- Genre: Cantopop
- Length: 40:33
- Label: Stars Shine International
- Producer: see Tracklisting

Hubert Wu chronology
Couple Getaway (2012)	The Butterfly Lovers (2013)

Couple Getaway is the debut album of Hubert Wu, a Hong Kong singer, released on 14 September 2012.

== Track ==
CD
No.	Title	Lyrics	Music	Length
1.	"Forgive Me"	Gene Lau	Real	4:22
2.	"Couple Getaway"	Vicky Fung	Victor Tse	3:52
3.	"Out of Control"	Josh	Kitson	4:07
4.	"I Cried for You"	Sandy Chang	Yoo Yeon-seok（유영석）	3:57
5.	"Hide From Me"	Josh	彭學斌	3:38
6.	"Yat San Yat Sam"	Sandy Chang	Yip Siu Chung	3:53
7.	"Happiness"	Gene Lau	Yen-j	4:28
8.	"I Didn't Know You Well"	Josh	James Wong	4:04
9.	"Show Must Go On"	Josh	James Wong	4:17
10.	"Couple Getaway (Mandarin)"	Vicky Fung	Victor Tse	3:51
Total length:				40:33

DVD
No.	Title	Length
1.	"Couple Getaway MV"
2.	"Forgive Me MV"

DVD（Dual Edition）
No.	Title	Length
1.	"Forgive Me"
2.	"Hide For Me"
3.	"Show Must Go On"
4.	"Out of Control"
5.	"Yat San Yat Sam"
6.	"The Storyman" (ft.Joyce Cheng)
7.	"Couple Getaway"
8.	"I Didn't Know You Well"
9.	"I Cried For You"
10.	"Happiness"

== Editions ==
- CD+DVD Edition
- Dual Edition (Live +); DVD includes songs Hubert performed in Neway Music Live.

== Music videos ==
Track	Director	Date
Couple Getaway on YouTube	Jacky @ Concept X	1 July 2012
Forgive Me on YouTube	Jacky @ Concept X	14 September 2012
Happiness on YouTube	Jacky @ Concept X	23 October 2012
Couple Getaway (Mandarin Version) on YouTube	Jacky @ Concept X	27 December 2012

== Chart performance ==
=== Hong Kong ===
Year	Track	Peak							
Year	Track	903	Week	RTHK	Week	997	Week	TVB	Week
2012	Couple Getaway	2	5	7	6	3	3	1	7
2012	Happiness	3	4	3	5	–	–	2	3
2012	Yat San Yat Sam	–	–	–	–	3	3	–	–
2012	Out of Control	–	–	–	–	–	–	–	–

=== Other charting songs ===
Track	Peak positions	
Track	TVB8	Metro Mandarin Chart
Couple Getaway (Mandarin)	3	4

== Awards ==
- Jade Solid Gold Selection (Round 1): The Butterfly Lovers
- Jade Solid Gold Selection (Round 3): Happiness
- IFPI (Hong Kong) :Gold Certification

== Promotion ==
=== 2012 ===
Date	Broadcast Channel	Show	Note
11 September	CR2	When I Was Young I Listen to the Radio	
13 September	Metro Info	All Star Flag Store	
14 September	CR2	Music 903	
15 September	CR1	Kiss Me Goodnight	
17–18 September	CR2	My Music 903	
18 September	RTHK	甜心家族	
18 September	CR1	1圈圈	
19 September	CR1	有誰共鳴	
19 September	CR2	My Music 903	
20 September	CR1	1圈圈	
20 September	CR2	My Music 903	
21 September	CR2	My Music 903	
23 September	—N/a	—N/a	Autograph Session at Paradise Mall, Chai Wan
2 October	CR2	Good Morning King	
