= I Was Here (album) =

Studio album by Hubert Wu
- Released: 19 December 2017
- Recorded: 2015–2017
- Genre: Cantopop
- Length: 35:45
- Label: Voice Entertainment, Universal Music
- Producer: see Track listing

Hubert Wu chronology
Knowing (2015)	I Was Here (2017)	Are You Feeling Blissful (2020)

I Was Here is the fourth studio album released by Hubert Wu. It is available for pre-order on 8 December 2017, and released on 19 December 2017.

== Track listing ==
CD
No.	Title	Writer(s)	Producer(s)	Length
1.	"I Was Here"	Alan Cheung; Sandy Chang	Herman Ho; Joseph Wei	3:26
2.	"Far Away"	Alan Cheung; Sandy Chang	Herman Ho; Joseph Wei	3:32
3.	"Friend Zone"	Larry Wong; Riley	Schumann	3:45
4.	"Intolerance"	Damon Chui; Sandy Chang	Herman Ho; Joseph Wei	3:14
5.	"Imperfect Me"	Terence Lam; Riley	Randy Chow	3:19
6.	"The Day After Today"	Hubert Wu; Hayes Yeung	Joseph Wei	4:06
7.	"Without You (ft.Stephanie Ho)"	Adrian Chow	Johnny Yim	3:42
8.	"Choice of Justice"	Alan Cheung; Hayes Yeung	Herman Ho; Joseph Wei	3:12
9.	"Daddy"	Alan Cheung; Hayes Yeung	Herman Ho; Alan Cheung	3:08
10.	"Unexpected Fate"	Chan Chi Man; Hayes Yeung	Herman Ho; Johnny Yim	3:59
Total length:				35:45

== Music videos ==
Song	Director	Published Date
Hubert Wu - I Was Here Official MV on YouTube	Tanyo	30 October 2017
Hubert Wu - Far Away Official MV on YouTube	楊善普	3 November 2017
Hubert Wu - Friend Zone Official MV on YouTube	詹可達@DFN	28 June 2017
Hubert Wu - Intolerance Official MV on YouTube		29 June 2017
Hubert Wu - Imperfect Me Official MV on YouTube	詹可達@DFN	9 March 2017
Hubert Wu - The Day After Tomorrow Official MV on YouTube		8 February 2018

== Hong Kong chart performance ==
Year	Single	Peak positions					
Year	Single	CRHK Ultimate 903	RTHK Chinese Pop Chart	Metro Radio Pop Chart 997	JSG Billboard (TVB)	hmv PLAY	Canadian Chinese Hit Songs
2016	Intolerance	-	-	2	1	-	-
2016	Unexpected Fate	-	-	-	1	-	-
2017	Imperfect Me	19	3	3	1	1	-
2017	Friend Zone	13	3	2	1	-	-
2017	I Was Here	-	3	1	1	-	4
2017	Far Away	-	3	-	1	-	-
2018	The Day After Today	-	-	-	1	-	-
"—" denotes releases that did not chart. "/" denotes releases were not sent to those music stations

Total No.1 Hits
903	RTHK	997	TVB	Note
0	0	1	7	The Total Number of Four No.1 Hit songs：0

== Awards and nominations ==
Year	Award	Category	Nominated work	Result	Ref.
2016	Jade Solid Gold Songs Selections	Second Round	Intolerance	Won	
2016	Jade Solid Gold Songs Selections	Second Round	Unexpected Fate	Nominated	
2017	Jade Solid Gold Songs Selections	First Round	Imperfect Me	Won	
2017	Jade Solid Gold Songs Selections	Second Round	I Was Here	Won	
2017	Jade Solid Gold Songs Selections	Second Round	Far Away	Won	
2017	RoadShow Cantonese Songs Chart Awards Ceremony	Hit Songs	Imperfect Me	Won	
2017	RoadShow Cantonese Songs Chart Awards Ceremony	Best MV	Imperfect Me	Won	
2017	Yahoo Asia Buzz Awards	Popular MVs	I Was Here	Won	
2017	Top Ten Chinese Gold Songs Award Concert	Top 10 Chinese Gold Songs	Friend Zone	Nominated	
2017	Top Ten Chinese Gold Songs Award Concert	Top 10 Chinese Gold Songs	Imperfect Me	Nominated	
2017	Top Ten Chinese Gold Songs Award Concert	Outstanding Artists	Himself	Nominated	

== Promotions ==
On 18 December, he was interviewed by SmarTone.
On 19 December, there would be a one-day manager campaign, and the first 200 fans who buy the album can get poster with autograph. He also attended interviews from CP Jobs, MOOV and Metro International to promote his new album.
