= Hubert Wu =

Hong Kong singer-songwriter

- 胡鴻鈞
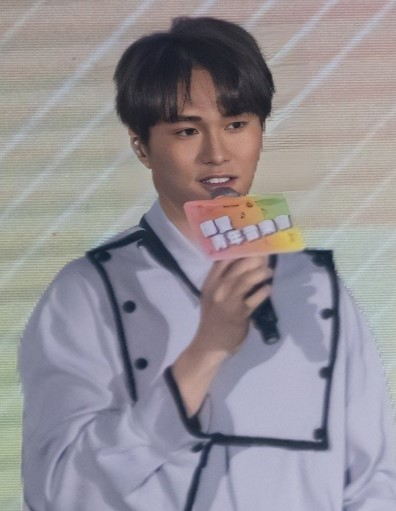
- Wu attending a concert organised by the Pok Oi Hospital at the Queen Elizabeth Stadium, Wan Chai on 3 December 2022.
- Born: Wu Hung Kwan; 27 March 1990 (age 36); Hong Kong
- Occupations: Singer-songwriter, actor, host
- Years active: 2010–present
- Agents: TVB(2010-2021); Shaw Brothers Pictures (2021–present)
- Notable work: The Exorcist's Meter series I Was Here
- Awards: TVB Anniversary Awards – Best TV Drama Theme Song; 2017 The Exorcist's Meter - 到此一遊 2020 The Exorcist's 2nd Meter - 凡人不懂愛

Chinese name
- Traditional Chinese: 胡鴻鈞
Transcriptions
- Musical career
- Origin: Hong Kong, China
- Genres: Pop
- Instruments: Vocals, piano
- Labels: Mass Music(2011); Stars Shine International(2012－2013); Voice Entertainment→TVB Music Group(2014-2023)
- Website: Sina Weibo; Tencent Weibo; TVB Weibo; Facebook Page; Youtube Channel

Hubert Wu (Chinese: 胡鴻鈞; born 27 March 1990) is a Hong Kong singer-songwriter and actor.

Wu was the first runner-up of The Voice (Hong Kong) Season 2, winner of New Talent Singing Awards 2010, and is currently signed with Shaw Brothers Pictures as an actor and singer-songwriter.

== Career ==
=== 1990–2011: Early life and career beginning ===
Wu was born on 27 March 1990 in Hong Kong. He studied in Lam Tin Methodist Primary School, Diocesan Boys' School, then promoted to Hang Seng School of Commerce, and furthered his degree studies in Hong Kong Polytechnic University (major in Management) and graduated in 2013.

In 2010, Wu entered the singing competition The Voice 2, and became the Most Improved contestant on the show, as well as won the first runner-up of the competition. This led to him signing a manager's contract with Television Broadcast Limited HK (TVB). In the same year, he also represented Hong Kong in the 2010 TVB International Chinese New Talent Singing Championship, winning the first place. In 2011, he represented Hong Kong to participate CMB Chin Chin Star Festival (Korea), where he won the bronze award.

=== 2012–2013: Couple Getaway and The Butterfly Lovers ===
On 6 February 2012, Wu signed a record deal with Stars Shine International and released his debut album on 14 September, entitled Couple Getaway. It topped the albums sales chart for the first week of its release. On 11 November, he held his first mini-concert 'NEWAY MUSIC LIVE X Hubert Wu Concert', with Joyce Cheng as a guest and Hins Cheung as a secret guest. At the same time, his album received gold certification. Later, he won the Best New Artist from Metro Hits Awards, RTHK Top 10 Gold Songs Awards and Jade Solid Gold Best Ten Music Awards Presentation. Due to the success of Couple Getaway, he had released Couple Getaway (Dual Edition Live +) in 2013.

On 2 October 2013, Wu released his second full-length album, The Butterfly Lovers due to the commercial success of the soundtrack he sang for Karma Rider. As Stars Shine International went bankrupt, he signed the record deal with Voice Entertainment.

=== 2014–2015: Knowing and hosting ===
In 2014, Wu had sung soundtracks for several television dramas. For example, he sang a duet with Kate Tsui for The Ultimate Addiction and a theme song for Rear Mirror. In July, he partnered with the 11 artists to host music show Jade Solid Gold and disclosed he would guest played an accountant trainee in Young Charioteers.

In 2015, Wu participated in the drama Blue Veins. He continued singing theme songs for TVB dramas, including a duet with Alfred Hui for the TV Drama, Eye in the Sky and collaborated with Alfred and Fred Cheng to sing the theme song for 2015 Miss Hong Kong Pageant. He was also featured in the project of RTHK, 12 Music Door. Escape and collaborated with different artists.

In August, Wu released the lead single from the upcoming album, A Better Tomorrow. Later, in October, he released the tribute single, Knowing, charted at no.1 on iTunes Single Chart. His third album was finally released on 2 December, including the songs, A Better Tomorrow and Knowing. It topped the HMV album sales chart and iTunes albums chart.

=== 2016–present: I Was Here and acting ===
Let Me Let Go, a song from the album Knowing had dominated the Jade Solid Gold Chart. In April 2016, the TVB drama Blue Veins was aired, in which Wu portrayed a vampire. In May 2016, he partnered with Alfred Hui and Jinny Ng hosted the reality show Summer Holiday. In mid-late 2016, Wu took part in the supernatural drama The Exorcist's Meter. In March 2017, he participated in another TVB drama, My Ages Apart.

In March 2017, Wu released the single "Imperfect Me". In June, he released another single, "Friend Zone". In late 2017, The Exorcist's Meter was aired. The drama received critical acclaim from the public. Wu played Shek Kam Dong in the drama and gained recognition with his performance. Another drama, My Ages Apart, aired in late 2017 as well. He played Henry Poon in the drama. With his role in The Exorcist's Meter, Wu earned multiple nominations at the 2017 TVB Anniversary Awards, including Best Supporting Actor, Most Popular Male Character and Most Improved Male Artiste. His album, I Was Here, was released on 19 December 2017.

In 2019, Wu took part in the sequel The Exorcist's 2nd Meter, which was aired in May 2020. His song, "Mortals Don't Know About Love" (凡人不懂愛, 2020) was a Top Ten Most Streamed Songs of the year on the Joox music streaming platform. His new song, "Are You Happy?", was released at the end of July 2020, which was very popular. The hit rate on the Internet had exceeded 1 million within one month. With his role as Mok Wai-ho in The Exorcist's 2nd Meter, Wu earned his first nominations for Best Actor as well as Favourite TVB Actor in Malaysia, and was placed among the top 5 nominees for Most Popular Male Character at the 2020 TVB Anniversary Awards.

In January 2021, Wu won the "Most Popular Male Singer" award at the "2020 Golden Song Awards Ceremony". In mid-2021, Wu’s contract with TVB ended, and he subsequently signed a contract with Shaw Brothers Pictures. In late 2021, the TVB dramas A Love of No Words and Hello Misfortune were aired. Wu played the first male lead in both dramas. With his role in A Love of No Words, Wu garnered multiple nominations at the 2021 TVB Anniversary Awards, including Best Actor (Top 10), Most Popular Male Character (Top 5) and Most Improved Male Artiste (Top 6).

== Personal life ==
Wu is good friends with The Exorcist's Meter co-actress Mandy Wong and co-actor Anthony Ho. They formed the friendship group “降魔的偷跳小隊”.

== Discography ==
- Couple Getaway (2012)
- The Butterfly Lovers (2013)
- Knowing (2015)
- I Was Here (2017)
- Are You Feeling Blissful (2020)

== Filmography ==
TV Dramas (TVB)
Year	Title	Role	Note
2011	Be Home for Dinner	Singer	Guest Appearance (Ep.129)
2015	Young Charioteers	Henry	Carefree
2016	Blue Veins	Pong Kit	Supporting Role
2017	The Exorcist's Meter	Shek Kam Dong / Mok Wai-ho (Ho Zai)	Major Supporting Role
2017	My Ages Apart	Henry Poon Wing-hang	Supporting Role
2018	Stealing Seconds	Law Sui-nam (GG)	Major Supporting Role
2018	Wife, Interrupted	Lee Yan-long (C Long)	Main Role
2020	The Exorcist's 2nd Meter	Mok Wai-ho (Ho Zai) / Shek Kam Dong	Main Role
2021	Armed Reaction 2021	Hugo Wu (Ah Chun)	Guest Appearance (Ep.1)
2021	A Love of No Words	Man Chor	Main Role
2021	Hello Missfortune	Chan Bak-hor	Main Role
2022	Barrack O'Karma 1968	Siu Ching	Supporting Role
2023	Speakers of Law	Himself	Special Appearance (Ep. 10)

== Awards and nominations ==
In 2017, Wu won the TVB Anniversary Awards for Most Popular Drama Theme Song with "I Was Here" (The Exorcist's Meter). In 2020, he won the same award with "Mortals Don't Know About Love" (The Exorcist's 2nd Meter).
