= Knowing (album) =

Studio album by Hubert Wu
- Released: 2 December 2015
- Recorded: 2013–2015
- Genre: Cantopop
- Label: Voice Entertainment
- Producer: see Tracklist

Hubert Wu chronology
The Butterfly Lovers (2013)	Knowing (2015)	I Was Here (2017)

Singles from Knowing
- 1. "Knowing" Released: 23 October 2015; 2. "Let Me Let Go" Released: 28 March 2016; 3. "Like Awakening" Released: 12 May 2016

Knowing is the third studio album by Hong Kong singer Hubert Wu. It was released by Voice Entertainment on 2 December 2015. It was available for pre-order on 24 November 2015.

== Track listing ==
CD
No.	Title	Writer(s)	Producer(s)	Length
1.	"Knowing"	Tan Kah Beng, Albert Leung	Johnny Yim	4:27
2.	"A Better Tomorrow"	Alan Cheung, Sandy Chang	Herman Ho; Joseph Wei	3:29
3.	"Like Awakening"	Terence Choi, Jolland Chan	Joseph Wei	4:21
4.	"Let Me Let Go"	Hubert Wu,楊熙	James Wong	3:51
5.	"Disheartened"	Jone Chui, Wyman Wong	Joseph Wei	4:28
6.	"The Truth (ft. Alfred Hui)"	Alan Cheung, Gene Lau	Herman Ho; Joseph Wei	3:21
7.	"Agony"	Alan Cheung, Joe Lei	Herman Ho; Joseph Wei	3:07
8.	"Out of My League"	Alex Cheung, Sandy Chang	Joseph Wei	4:39
9.	"Powerless"	Dominic Chu,邱善薇,王仲傑	Dominic Chu	4:11
10.	"Knowing (Mandarin)"	Tan Kah Beng, Mavis Hee	Joseph Wei	4:24

== Music video ==
Date	Title	Note
24 November 2014	Out of My League on YouTube	Theme song for Rear Mirror
2 August 2015	A Better Tomorrow on YouTube	Theme song for The Executioner
19 November 2015	Knowing on YouTube	Lead single
28 March 2016	Let Me Let Go on YouTube	2nd single
12 May 2016	Like Awakening on YouTube	3rd single

== Soundtrack appearances ==
Year	Title	TV show
2014	Out of My League	Rear Mirror
2015	The Truth (ft. Alfred Hui) on YouTube	Eye in the Sky
2015	A Better Tomorrow	The Executioner
2016	Agony on YouTube	The Last Healer in Forbidden City

== Chart performance ==
=== Singles ===
Year	Title	903	RTHK	997	TVB	DBC Chart
2015	Knowing	–	1	3	1	4
2016	Let Me Let Go	–	–	–	1	–
2016	Like Awakening	–	–	2	–	–

=== Other charted songs ===
Year	Title	903	RTHK	997	TVB
2014	Out of My League	–	–	4	–
2015	A Better Tomorrow	–	1	2	1

== Awards ==
=== Out of My League ===
- 2014 Metro Hit Awards – Best Original Song
- 2015 Music King Awards – Best Original Song

=== The Truth ===
- 2015 Jade Solid Gold Songs Selection Part 1 – Winning Song
- 2015 StarHub TVB Awards – My Favorite Soundtrack
- 2015 Jade Solid Gold Best 10 Awards Presentation – Jade Solid Gold Best 10 Songs

=== Knowing ===
- 2015 Jade Solid Gold Songs Selection Part 2 – Winning Song
- 2015 Jade Solid Gold Best 10 Awards Presentation – Best Re-imagined Song
- 2015 Jade Solid Gold Best 10 Awards Presentation – Jade Solid Gold Best 10 Songs
- 2015 Metro Hit Awards – Metro Hit Songs
- 2015 TVB8 Mandarin Music On Demand Awards Presentation – Top Mandarin Songs
- 2015 Hong Kong Music Video Selection Part 3 – Winning MV
- 2015 Hong Kong Music Video Awards Presentation – Popular Music Video of the Year (Bronze Award)
- 2016 Music King Awards – Cantonese Gold Song
- 2016 Canadian Chinese Pop Music Chart G-Hit Awards – Top 10 Cantonese Songs

=== Let Me Let Go ===
- 2016 Jade Solid Gold Songs Selection Part 1 – Winning Song
- 3rd Cantopop Songs Chart Awards Presentation – Best Music Video

=== Like Awakening ===
- 2016 Jade Solid Gold Songs Selection Part 1 – Winning Song
