= Shigandang =

East Asian ritualistic stone tablet

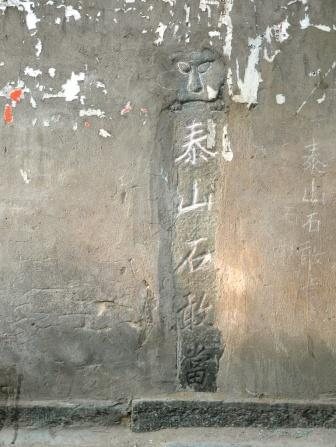
A Mount Tai shigandang (泰山石敢當) in Beijing, China

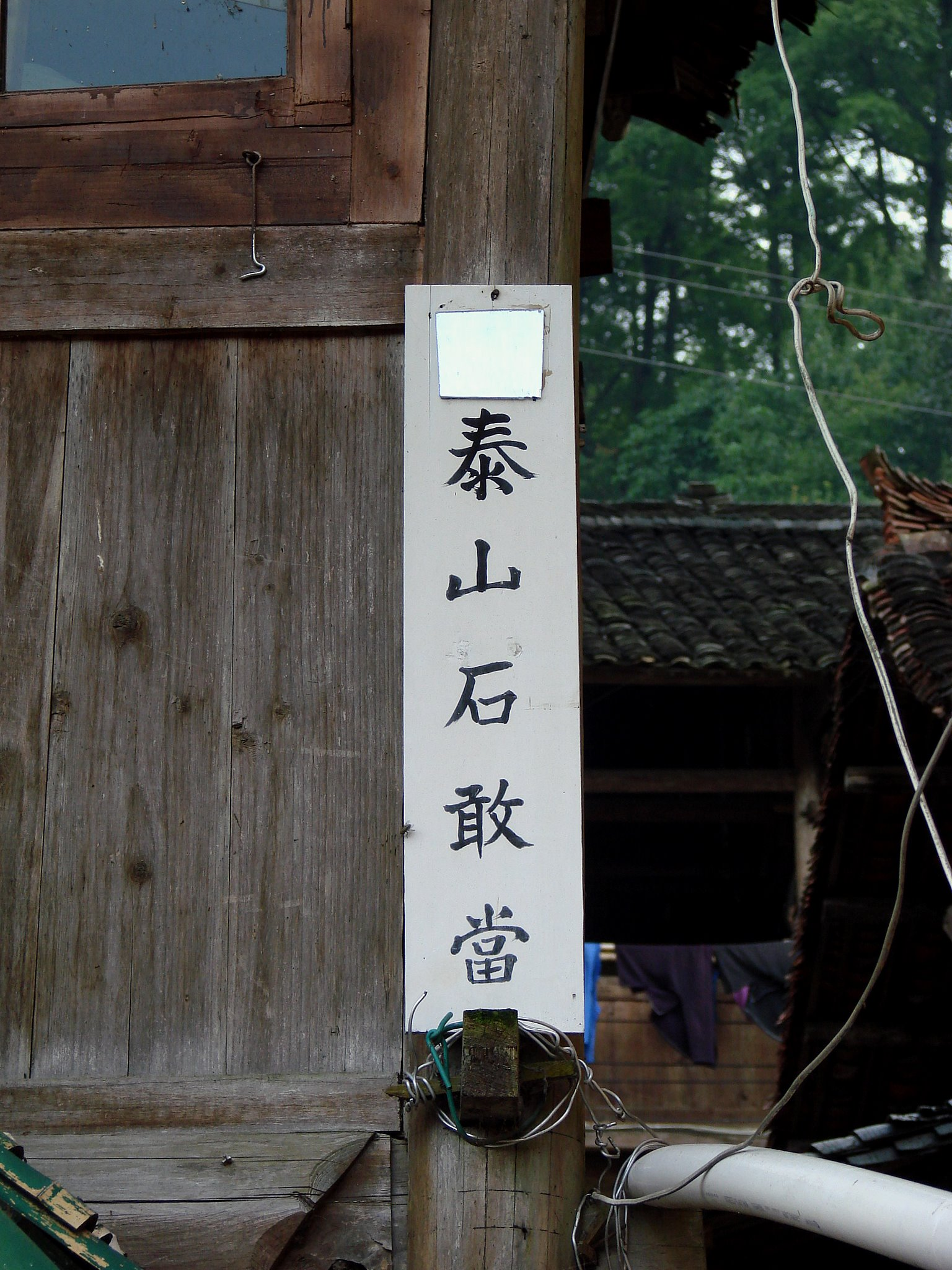
Shigandang erected at the entrance of a lane, etc., to drive away misfortune or evil spirits

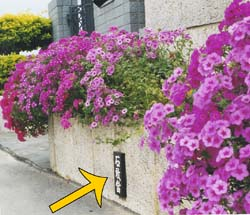
An ishigantō in Okinawa, Japan

Shigandang (simplified Chinese: 石敢当; traditional Chinese: 石敢當; pinyin: shígǎndāng; Wade–Giles: shih-kan-tang; Japanese: 石敢當, romanized: ishigantō) is an ornamental stone tablet with writing, which is used to exorcise evil spirits in East Asia. Shigandang are often associated with Mount Tai and are often placed on street intersections or three-way junctions, especially in the crossing, which is often considered a spiritually dangerous place (凶位).

Erecting shigandang near houses, villages, bridges and roads has a long history in China. The phrase shigandang first appeared in the Western Han dynasty. During the Tang dynasty, these three characters were carved on stones and were used to protect houses from evil until the Song dynasty Taishan shigandang (泰山石敢當) appeared. It became widely popular throughout the country to set up shigandang or Taishan shigandang near villages and houses. Furthermore, the custom also spread to the Han cultural sphere overseas, especially the Ryukyu Islands (Okinawa).

The shigandang's functions has diversified to not only protecting people from evil, but also from wind, water and disasters. The Taishan shigandang has been listed among the first batch of national nonmaterial cultural heritage in 2006.

Apart from a shigandang, another option is to place a stone engraved with Nāmó Ēmítuófó (南無阿彌陀佛).

== See also ==
- Shi Gandang
- Bagua (八卦)
- Chinese folk religion
- Chinese ritual mastery traditions
- Chinese spiritual world concepts
- Fu Lu (符籙)
- Kai Guang (開光)
- Spirit tablets
