= Jinny Ng discography =

- Studio albums: 3
- EPs: 1
- Compilation albums: 1
- Singles: 28
- Music videos: 41

This is the discography documenting albums and singles released by Cantopop singer Jinny Ng.

== Studio albums ==
#	Album Info	Track listing
1st	Blue Sky: Released：May 28, 2012; Label: Stars Shine International	CD: 1. 若要人不知 Love Cannot Be Hidden; 2. 即興地圖 Wherever We Go; 3. 知己 Soulmate（ft.Alfred Hui）; 4. 第一天失戀 Day 1 (After Breakup); 5. Can't Let You Go; 6. 我沒有傷心 My Heart Isn't Broken; 7. 裝飾的眼淚 No More Tears; 8. 鬧鐘 Alarm Clock; 9. 知己 Soulmate（Mandarin）（ft.Alfred Hui）; 10. 第一天失戀 Day 1 (After Breakup)（Mandarin）; 11. 我不會傷心 I Won't Let My Heart Get Broken（Mandarin）
2nd	I Learned: Released：June 26, 2013; Label: Stars Shine International	CD: 1. 我懂了 I Learned; 2. 沒結果 Meaningless Love; 3. 炊煙 Smoke; 4. 救救我 Rescue Me（ft. Hubert Wu）; 5. 未上心 Let It Be; 6. 等 Waiting; 7. 把歌談心 Confession; 8. 失寵 Stand By; 9. 好心人 Cruel To Be Kind; 10. 無所謂 Whatever（Mandarin）; 11. 我明白 I Understand（Mandarin）
3rd	The Secret of Tears: Released：January 21, 2016; Label: Voice Entertainment	CD: 1. 我們都受傷 We Are All Hurt; 2. 眼淚的秘密 The Secret of Tears; 3. 愛 Love; 4. 美好的時光 The Beautiful Time; 5. 捨得分手 Letting You Go (Mandarin); 6. 易放難收 Falling into You; 7. 誘心人 Tempting Heart; 8. 找個離開你的理由 A Reason To Leave You; 9. 和你的約定 The Promise (Mandarin); 10. 愛 Love (Mandarin); 11. 眼淚的秘密 The Secret of Tears (Mandarin)

== Extended play ==
#	Album Info	Track listing
1st	Love Diary: Released：November 9, 2010; Label: Stars Shine International	CD: 1. 錯過了 I'm Glad I'm Missed; 2. 愛要撐下去 Be Strong; 3. 孩子眼 The Child's Eyes; 4. 影迷 The Moviegoer; 5. 窗外 Outside The Window (Mandarin); 6. 我的大日子 My Big Day; 7. 憑什麼 Why; 8. 聽電影 Listening To Movies (Mandarin); DVD: 1. Making of the EP; 2. 愛要撐下去

== Compilation album ==
#	Album Info	Track listing
1st	The Love Collection: Released：November 27, 2014; Label: Voice Entertainment	CD: 1. 越難越愛 Love Is Not Easy; 2. 愛我請留言 Swipe Tap Love; 3. 休止符 Rest Note; 4. 錯過了 I'm Glad I'm Missed; 5. 愛要撐下去 Be Strong; 6. 知己 Soulmate (ft.Alfred Hui); 7. 我懂了 I Learned; 8. 我沒有傷心 My Heart Ain't Broken; 9. 沒結果 Meaningless Love; 10. 炊煙 Smoke; 11. 想起你 Thinking Of You; 12. 憑什麼 Why; 13. 越難越愛 Love Is Not Easy (Mandarin); 14. 第一天失戀 Day 1 (After Breakup)

== Singles ==
=== As lead singer ===
Title	Year	Peak chart positions						Album
Title	Year	903 Top 20	RTHK	Metro Radio	TVB	DBC Chart	CANADIAN CHINESE POP MUSIC	Album
"The Moviegoer"	2010	12	12	5	6	—	—	Love Diary
"I'm Glad I'm Missed"	2010	17	5	—	3	—	—	Love Diary
"Be Strong"	2010	—	—	6	—	—	—	Love Diary
"Soulmate"	2011	—	12	4	1	—	—	Blue Sky
"Day 1 (After Breakup)"	2012	—	3	3	3	—	—	Blue Sky
"My Heart Isn't Broken"	2012	17	—	2	1	—	—	Blue Sky
"I Learned"	2013	—	3	3	1	—	—	I Learned
"Smoke"	2013	—	7	4	1	—	—	I Learned
"Rescue Me"	2013	—	—	3	2	—	—	The Butterfly Lovers
"Meaningless Love"	2013	—	—	—	—	—	—	I Learned
"Rest Note"	2014	—	10	3	1	—	—	Love Collection
"Swipe Tap Love"	2014	—	—	1	1	—	—	Love Collection
"Thinking of You"	2014	—	—	—	—	—	—	Love Collection
"Love Is Not Easy"	2014	—	3	1	1	—	—	Love Collection
"The Beautiful Time"	2015	—	3	2	1	—	—	The Secret of Tears
"The Secret of Tears"	2015	—	1	1	1	—	—	The Secret of Tears
"We Are All Hurt"	2015	—	3	1	1	4	—	The Secret of Tears
"Love"	2016	—	1	—	1	2	—	The Secret of Tears
"Perfect Life"	2016	—	—	—	—	—	—	Come Home Love: Dinner at 8
"A Reason To Leave You"	2016	—	—	—	1	—	—	"The Secret of Tears" "Watch Out Boss"
"Suffering"	2016	—	—	—	1	—	—	Nirvana in Fire
"Last Breakup"	2016	—	—	6	1	—	—	Between Love & Desire
"Tempting Heart"	2016	—	—	—	3	—	—	The Secret of Tears
"Always on My Mind"	2017	—	—	—	1	—	8	Nothing Gold Can Stay
"Bleeding Rose"	2017	—	—	16	1	—	13	The Exorcist's Meter
"Do Not Remember Anymore"	2017	—	—	—	1	—	—	My Ages Apart
"Impermanent"	2018	—	—	—	—	—	—	"Story of Yanxi Palace"
"Have Been Betrayed"	2018	—	—	—	10	—	—	"Another Era"
"Connected By Love"	2019	—	—	—	1	—	—	"Ruyi's Royal Love in the Palace"
"Secret Love"	2019	—	—	—	—	—	—	"The Ghetto-Fabulous Lady"
"I Remember"	2019	—	—	—	10	—	—	"The Defected"
"Love is Priceless"	2019	—	—	—	—	—	—	"My Life As Loan Shark"
"Always Wrong"	2019	—	—	—	-	—	—	"Wonder Women"
"Time After Time"	2020	—	—	—	1	—	—	"The Dripping Sauce"
"The Fool"	2020	—	—	—	—	—	—	
"I Don’t Miss At You All"	2020	—	—	—	10	—	—	"Life After Death"
"The Longest Distance"	2020	—	—	—	—	—	—	"Death By Zero"
"Just Remember"	2020	—	—	—	-	—	—	"The Dripping Sauce"
"Wrong Day"	2020	—	—	—	1	—	—	"Shadow of Justice"
"Fire and the Match"	2020	—	—	—	-	—	—	
"—" denotes releases that did not chart or were not sent to those music stations. "^" denotes releases that having copyright tax disputes with TVB	2020							

Total No.1 Hits
903	RTHK	997	TVB	Note
0	2	5	17	The Total Number of Four No.1 Hit songs：0

=== Soundtrack appearance ===
Title	Year	Film/TV Drama	Note
神奇大地	2011	Pokémon Best Wishes!	Theme Song
前行吧	2014	Aikatsu!	Theme Song
Rest Note	2014	A Time of Love	Theme Song
Thinking of Love	2014	Storm in a Cocoon	Interlude
Swipe Tap Love	2014	Swipe Tap Love	Theme Song
We Are The Only One	2014	2014 Brazil FIFA World Cup Song	with TVB artists
Love Is Not Easy	2014	Line Walker	Ending Theme Song
The Beautiful Time	2015	Young Charioteers	Theme Song
The Secret of Tears	2015	The Empress of China	Ending Theme Song
We Are All Hurt	2015	Angel In-the-Making	Theme Song
Perfect Life	2016	Come Home Love: Dinner at 8	Theme Song
Love	2016	A Time of Love II – Germany	Theme Song
A Reason To Leave You	2016	Watch Out Boss	Theme Song
Tempting Heart	2016	Inspector Gourmet	Theme Song
Suffering	2016	Nirvana in Fire	Ending Theme Song
Last Breakup	2016	Between Love & Desire	Theme Song
Always on My Mind	2017	Nothing Gold Can Stay	Theme Song
Bleeding Rose	2017	The Exorcist's Meter	Interlude
Do Not Remember Anymore	2017	My Ages Apart	Ending Theme Song
Impermanent	2018	Story of Yanxi Palace	Theme Song for TVB Edition
Have Been Betrayed	2018	Another Era	Interlude
Connected By Love	2019	Ruyi's Royal Love in the Palace	Theme Song for TVB Edition
Secret Love	2019	The Ghetto-Fabulous Lady	Theme Song
I Remember	2019	The Defected	Interlude
Love is Priceless	2019	My Life As Loan Shark	Interlude
Always Wrong	2019	Wonder Women	Interlude
Time After Time	2020	The Dripping Sauce	Interlude
The Fool	2020		
I Don’t Miss At You All	2020	Life After Death	Interlude
The Longest Distance	2020	Death By Zero	Interlude
Just Remember	2021		
Wrong Day	2021	Shadow of Justice	Interlude
Fire and the Match	2021		
How Time Flies	Used Good	Theme Song	

== Music videos ==
=== 2010 ===
Song
錯過了 I'm Glad I'm Missed
愛要撐下去 Be Strong
孩子眼 Child's Eyes
影迷 The Moviegoer
窗外 Outside The Window
我的大日子 My Big Day

=== 2011 ===
Song
知己 Soulmate

=== 2012 ===
Song
第一天失戀 Day 1 (After Breakup)
第一天失戀 Day 1 (After Breakup)（Mandarin）
我沒有傷心 My Heart Isn't Broken
我不會傷心 I Won't Let My Heart Get Broken
Can't Let You Go

=== 2013 ===
Song
我懂了 I Learned
我明白 I Understand (Mandarin)
炊煙 Smoke
沒結果 Meaningless Love
無所謂 Whatever (Mandarin)
暗戀 Crush

=== 2014 ===
Song
休止符 Rest Note
愛我請留言 Swipe Tape Love
想起你 Thinking of You
越難越愛 Love Is Not Easy
越難越愛 Love Is Not Easy (Mandarin)

=== 2015 ===
Song
美好的時光 The Beautiful Times
眼淚的秘密 The Secret of Tears
我們都受傷 We Are All Hurt

=== 2016 ===
Song
愛 Love
可以背負更多 Suffering
最後一次分手 Last Breakup

=== 2017 ===
Song
麻醉
你在我心間 Always On My Mind

=== As featuring artist ===
==== 2016 ====
Song
財神到

== Writing credits ==
#	Song	Year	Artist	Album	Contribution	
#	Song	Year	Artist	Album	Lyrics	Melody
1	Outside The Window (Mandarin)	2010	Herself	Love Diary	Yes	No
2	Letting You Go (Mandarin)	2016	Herself	The Secret of Tears	Yes	Yes
