= List of awards and nominations received by Jinny Ng =

Jinny Ng awards and nominations
Awards and nominations
Award	Wins	Nominations
IFPI Hong Kong Sales Awards	4	4
RTHK Top 10 Gold Songs Awards	3	13
Metro Showbiz Hit Awards	9	9
Metro Radio Mandarin Music Awards	6	6
Jade Solid Gold Best 10 Awards Presentation	4	19
Jade Solid Gold Songs Selections	9	14
TV Awards Presentation	2	13
TVB Star Awards Malaysia	1	5
StarHub TVB Awards	0	6
Yahoo! Asia Buzz Awards	2	2
"King of Music" Global Chinese Music Awards	4	4
Metro Children's Song Awards Presentation	2	2
TVB8 Mandarin Music On Demand Awards Presentation	7	7
Music Pioneer Chart	5	5
Global Chinese Song Chart	1	1
uChannel Music Awards	1	1
Sprite Music Chart Awards	1	1
uChinese Music Festival Awards	1	1

Totals (Note: Certain award groups do not simply award one winner. They acknowledge several different recipients, have runners-up, and have third place. Since this is a specific recognition and is different from losing an award, runner-up mentions are considered wins in this award tally. For simplification and to avoid errors, each award in this list has been presumed to have had a prior nomination.)
- Wins: 62
- Nominations: 114

Jinny Ng is a Cantopop singer-songwriter in Hong Kong. She debuted in 2010 with her release, Love Diary.

== Music awards ==
=== IFPI Hong Kong Sales Awards ===
Year	Award	Work	Result	Ref.
2011	Best Sales Local New Female Vocalist	Herself	Won	
2014	Top 10 Digital Songs	I Learned	Won	
2016	Top 10 Best-Selling Cantopop Albums	Love Collection	Won	
2017	Top 10 Best-Selling Cantopop Albums	The Secret of Tears	Won	

=== RTHK Top 10 Gold Songs Awards ===
The RTHK Top 10 Gold Songs Awards Ceremony(zh:十大中文金曲頒獎音樂會) is held annually in Hong Kong since 1978. The awards are determined by Radio and Television Hong Kong based on the work of all Asian artists (mostly cantopop) for the previous year.

Year	Award	Work	Result	Ref.
2011	Best New Artist	Herself	Merit	
2013	Artist On The Rise	Herself	Nominated	
2013	Top 10 Artist	Herself	Nominated	
2014	Top 10 Artist	Herself	Nominated	
2014	Top 10 Songs	I Learned	Nominated	
2015	Top 10 Songs	Love Is Not Easy	Won	
2015	Top 10 Artists	Herself	Nominated	
2016	Top 10 Artists	Herself	Nominated	
2016	Top 10 Songs	The Secret of Tears	Won	
2016	Top 10 Songs	The Beautiful Time	Nominated	
2017	Top 10 Songs	We Are All Hurt	Nominated	
2017	Top 10 Songs	Love	Nominated	
2017	Top 10 Artists	Herself	Nominated	

=== Metro Showbiz Hit Awards ===
The Metro Showbiz Hit Awards (新城勁爆頒獎禮) is held in Hong Kong annually by Metro Showbiz radio station. It focus mostly in cantopop music.

Year	Award	Work	Result	Ref.
2010	New Debut Female Artist	Herself	Won	
2011	Artist On The Rise	Herself	Won	
2012	Best Digital Song	My Heart Isn't Broken	Won	
2013	Best Collaboration	Crush	Won	
2013	Hit Karaoke Song	I Learned	Won	
2014	Song of the Year	Love Is Not Easy	Won	
2014	Best Digital Song	Swipe Tap Love	Gold Award	
2015	Female Artist of the Year	Herself	Gold Award	
2015	Most Streamed Song	The Secret of the Tears	Won	

=== Metro Radio Mandarin Music Awards ===
It was first awarded in 2002 and ended in 2015.

Year	Award	Work	Result	Ref.
2010	Best Collaboration	Love @ Earth	Won	
2012	Best Collaboration	Soulmate	Won	
2013	Best Original Song	I Understand	Won	
2014	Best Digital Song	煙雨迷霧 Smoky	Won	
2015	Song of the Year	Love Is Not Easy	Won	
2015	Popular Idol	Herself	Gold Award	

=== Jade Solid Gold Best 10 Awards Presentation ===
Year	Award	Work	Result	Ref.
2011	Most Popular Adapted Song	I'm Glad I'm Missed	Nominated	
2011	Best Push	Herself	Nominated	
2011	Popular Newcomer	Herself	Bronze Award	
2012	Outstanding Performance	Herself	Nominated	
2012	Popular Asian-Pacific Hong Kong Female Artist	Herself	Nominated	
2012	Most Popular Female Artist	Herself	Nominated	
2012	Best Collaboration	Soulmate	Nominated	
2013	Outstanding Performance	Herself	Nominated	
2013	Popular Asian-Pacific Hong Kong Female Artist	Herself	Nominated	
2013	Most Popular Female Artist	Herself	Nominated	
2014	Most Popular Female Artist	Herself	Nominated	
2014	Jade Solid Gold Best 10 Song	I Learned	Nominated	
2014	Jade Solid Gold Best 10 Song	Smoke	Nominated	
2014	Jade Solid Gold Best 10 Song	Crush	Nominated	
2015	Jade Solid Gold Best 10 Song	Rest Note	Nominated	
2015	Jade Solid Gold Best 10 Song	Swipe Tap Love	Won	
2015	Jade Solid Gold Best 10 Song	Love Is Not Easy	Won	
2015	Jade Solid Gold Best 10 Song	Love Is Not Easy	Gold Award	
2015	Most Popular Female Singer	Herself	Nominated	

=== Jade Solid Gold Songs Selections ===
Year	Award	Work	Result	Ref.
2011	Third Round	Soulmate	Won	
2012	First Round	Day 1 (After Breakup)	Won	
2012	Second Round	My Heart Isn't Broken	Won	
2013	First Round	I Learned	Won	
2014	First Round	Rest Note	Nominated	
2014	First Round	Swipe Tap Love	Won	
2015	First Round	The Secret of Tears	Won	
2015	First Round	The Beautiful Time	Nominated	
2015	Second Round	We Are All Hurt	Won	
2016	First Round	Love	Won	
2016	First Round	Perfect Life	Won	
2016	Second Round	Tempting Heart	Nominated	
2016	Second Round	Suffering	Nominated	
2016	Second Round	Last Breakup	Nominated	
2017	Second Round	Always On My Mind	Nominated	

=== Asian Academy Creative Awards ===
Year	Award	Work	Result	Ref.
2025	Best Actor/Actress in a Comedy Role	Battle of Marriage	Won	

=== TVB Anniversary Awards ===
Year	Award	Work	Result	Ref.
2014	Best Soundtrack	Love Is Not Easy	Won	
2014	Best Soundtrack	Swipe Tap Love	Nominated	
2014	Best Soundtrack	Thinking of You	Nominated	
2015	Best Soundtrack	The Beautiful Time	Nominated	
2015	Best Soundtrack	The Secret of Tear	Won	
2016	Best Soundtrack	We Are All Hurt	Nominated	
2016	Best Soundtrack	Perfect Life	Nominated	
2016	Best Soundtrack	Suffering	Nominated	
2016	Best Soundtrack	Last Breakup	Nominated	
2016	Best Soundtrack	Tempting Heart	Nominated	
2018	Best Soundtrack	Bleeding Rose	Nominated	
2018	Best Soundtrack	Always On Mind	Nominated	
2018	Best Soundtrack	Do Not Remember Anymore	Nominated	

=== TVB Star Awards Malaysia ===
Year	Award	Work	Result	Ref.
2014	Best Soundtrack	Love Is Not Easy	Won	
2015	Best Soundtrack	The Beautiful Time	Nominated	
2016	Best Soundtrack	We Are All Hurt	Nominated	

=== StarHub TVB Awards ===
Year	Award	Work	Result	Ref.
2014	Best Soundtrack	Rest Note	Nominated	
2015	Best Soundtrack	The Beautiful Time	Nominated	
2016	Best Soundtrack	We Are All Hurt	Nominated	
2016	Best Soundtrack	Last Breakup	Nominated	
2016	Best Soundtrack	Tempting Heart	Nominated	

=== Yahoo! Asia Buzz Awards ===
Year	Award	Work	Result	Ref.
2014	Rising Female Artist	Herself	Won	
2014	Hit Song	Love Is Not Easy	Won	

=== "King of Music" Global Chinese Music Awards ===
Year	Award	Work	Result	Ref.
2010	Best New Artist	Herself	Won	
2011	Artist on the Rise	Herself	Won	
2011	Best Collaboration	Soulmate	Won	
2013	Artist on the Rise	Herself	Won	

=== Metro Children's Song Awards Presentation ===
It is first founded in 2005 by Metro Radio, it was the second ceremony for children's songs. It has been suspended since 2015.

Year	Award	Work	Result	Ref.
2011	Top Children's Songs	神奇大地	Won	
2013	Top Children's Songs	前行吧	Won	

=== TVB8 Mandarin Music On Demand Awards Presentation ===
It has suspended since 2016.

Year	Award	Work	Result	Ref.
2010	Best New Artist	Herself	Bronze	
2012	Best Collaboration	Soulmate	Won	
2013	Top 10 Songs	I Understand	Won	
2014	Top 10 Songs	Love Is Not Easy	Won	
2014	Best Song	Love Is Not Easy	Won	
2015	Best Song	The Secret of Tears	Won	
2015	Top 10 Songs	The Secret of Tears	Won	

=== Music Pioneer Chart ===
Year	Award	Work	Result	Ref.
2011	Best New Artist (HK)	Herself	Won	
2013	Best Push	Herself	Won	
2013	Best Live Act	Herself	Won	
2014	Best Soundtrack	Love Is Not Easy	Won	
2015	Top 10 Songs among Hong Kong and Taiwan Region	The Secret of Tears	Won	

=== Global Chinese Song Chart ===
Year	Award	Work	Result	Ref.
2014	Top 20 Songs	Love Is Not Easy	Won	

=== uChannel Music Awards ===
Year	Award	Work	Result	Ref.
2011	Best Collaboration	Soulmate	Won	

=== Sprite Music Chart Awards ===
Year	Award	Work	Result	Ref.
2011	Best New Artist	Herself	Won	

=== Chinese Music Festival Awards ===
Year	Award	Work	Result	Ref.
2011	Best New Artist	Herself	Won	

== Other awards ==
=== Host ===
==== TVB Star Awards Malaysia ====
Year	Award	Work	Result	Ref.
2016	Best Host	Toy Red Star Nuisance Summer - 嘩鬼上學去	Nominated	
2016	Best Host	Street Sorcerers	Nominated	

==== StarHub TVB Awards ====
Year	Award	Work	Result	Ref.
2016	Best Host	Street Sorcerers	Nominated	
