= Blue Sky (Jinny Ng album) =

Studio album by Jinny Ng
- Released: 28 May 2012
- Recorded: 2011–2012
- Genre: Cantopop
- Length: 40:38
- Language: Cantonese
- Label: Stars Shine International

Jinny Ng chronology
Love Diary (2010)	Blue Sky (2012)	I Learned (2013)

Singles from Blue Sky
- 1. "Day 1 (After Breakup)" Released: 21 May 2012; 2. "My Heart Isn't Broken" Released: 15 June 2012; 3. "Can't Let You Go" Released: 19 September 2012

Blue Sky is the first studio album from Hong Kong singer-songwriter Jinny Ng released on 28 May 2012. The album consists of 3 lead singles, which were "Day 1 (After Breakup)", "My Heart Isn't Broken" and "Can't Let You Go", as well as the covers of "No More Tears" by Anita Mui and "Soulmate," a collaboration with Alfred Hui.

== Track listing ==
CD
No.	Title	Writer(s)	Producers	Length
1.	"Love Cannot Be Hidden"	Albert Leung; Chan Fai-young	Chan	3:17
2.	"Wherever We Go"	Chan; England Cheng	Chan	3:15
3.	"Soulmate (ft. Alfred Hui)"	Alan Cheung; Sandy Chang	Jimmy Yim	3:41
4.	"Day 1 (After Breakup)"	James Wong; Erica Li	Yim	4:03
5.	"Can't Let You Go"	David Mann	Joseph Wei	4:03
6.	"My Heart Isn't Broken"	Wong; Josh	Yim	3:41
7.	"No More Tears"	Mariya Takeuchi; Keith Chan	Yip Kwong Kun	3:56
8.	"Alarm Clock"	Alex Lung; Kwok Yi To	Yip	3:15
9.	"Soulmate (Mandarin)"	Cheung; Chang	Wei	3:41
10.	"Day 1 (After Breakup) (Mandarin)"	Wong; Chang	Wei	4:02
11.	"I Won't Let My Heart Get Broken (My Heart Isn't Broken Mandarin Version)"	Wong; Chang	Wei	3:39
Total length:				40:38

== Critical reception ==
Professional ratings
Review scores
Source	Rating
Douban Music	1.8/5

It has received mixed feedback. It was criticized as a bad album because of the songwriting and Jinny's singing skill.

== Chart performance ==
=== Singles ===
Year	Title	903	RTHK	997	TVB
2012	Day 1 (After Breakup)	–	3	3	3
2012	My Heart Isn't Broken	17	–	2	1

=== Other Song ===
Year	Title	RTHK	997	TVB
2011	Soulmate	12	4	1

== Music videos ==
- Day 1 (After Breakup) on YouTube
- My Heart Isn't Broken on YouTube
- Can't Let You Go on YouTube

Besides, there are 2 more music videos for Soulmate.

- Soulmate on YouTube
- Soulmate (Mandarin) on YouTube

== Awards ==
She had won several awards because of the album. "Soulmate" had won a trophy from 2011 Jade Solid Gold Songs Selection – 3rd Round, Best Collaboration award from 2011 Music King Awards, Youth Choice: Collaboration Song from uChannel Music Awards, Bronze Award for Collaboration of the Year from 2011 Young D Hit Songs Awards and from 2012 Metro Radio Mandarin Hits Music Awards Presentation. "Day 1 (After Breakup)" had won a trophy from 2012 Jade Solid Gold Songs Selection – 1st Round and "My Heart Isn't Broken" won an award from 2012 Jade Solid Gold Songs Selection – 2nd Round.
