= The Love Collection (Jinny Ng album) =

Compilation album by Jinny Ng
- Released: 27 November 2014
- Recorded: 2014
- Genre: Cantopop
- Length: 55:49
- Label: Voice Entertainment

Jinny Ng chronology
I Learned (2013)	The Love Collection (2014)	The Secret of Tears (2016)

The Love Collection is the first compilation album released by Hong Kong female singer, Jinny Ng. It was released on 27 November 2014 along with 4 different postcards.

== Track listing ==
Standard version
No.	Title	Writer(s)	Producers	Length
1.	"Love Is Not Easy"	Damon Chui; Sandy Chang	Johnny Yim; Herman Ho; Joseph Wei	3:57
2.	"Swipe Tap Love"	Alan Cheung; Chang	Ho; Wei	3:52
3.	"Rest Note"	Label Li; Chui	Ho; Wei	3:49
4.	"I'm Glad I'm Missed"	Liu; Wong	Yim	3:58
5.	"Be Strong"	Cheung; Wong	Cheung	3:56
6.	"Soulmate (ft. Alfred Hui)"	Cheung; Chang	Yim	3:41
7.	"I Learned"	Cheung; Chang; Josh	Yim	4:00
8.	"My Heart Ain't Broken"	James Wong; Josh	Yim	3:41
9.	"Meaningless Love"	Sebastian Poon	Yim	3:56
10.	"Smoke"	claudiayuyu	Ho; Wei	4:14
11.	"Thinking of You"	Cheung; Chang	Ho; Cheung	4:32
12.	"Why"	Alex Lung; Wong	Cheung	4:05
13.	"Love Is Not Easy Mandarin "	Chui; Cheung	Wei	3:58
14.	"Day 1 (After Break Up)"	Erica Li; James Wong	Yim	4:03
Total length:				55:49

== Record sales charts ==
Record Sales Chart
HMV
1

== Awards and nominations ==
=== IFPI Hong Kong Sales Awards ===
Year	Award	Work	Result	Ref
2016	Top 10 Best-Selling Cantopop Albums	Love Collection	Won	
