= I Learned =

Studio album by Jinny Ng
- Released: 26 June 2013
- Recorded: 2013
- Genre: Cantopop
- Length: 42:30
- Language: Cantonese
- Label: Stars Shine International

Jinny Ng chronology
Blue Sky (2012)	I Learned (2013)	The Love Collection (2014)

Singles from I Learned
- 1. "I Learned" Released: 21 May 2013; 2. "Smoke" Released: 21 June 2013; 3. "Meaningless Love" Released: 6 September 2013

I Learned is the second studio album from Hong Kong singer-songwriter Jinny Ng, released on 26 June 2013. "I Learned", "Smoke", and "Meaningless Love" were released as singles from the album, and the album also included "Rescue Me" featuring Hubert Wu and a cover of "Confession" by Sandy Lamb.

== Tracklisting ==
CD
No.	Title	Writer(s)	Producers	Length
1.	"I Learned"	Alex Cheung; Josh; Sandy Chang	Johnny Yim	4:03
2.	"Meaningless Love"	Sebastian Poon	Yim	3:57
3.	"Smoke"	Tsang Chui Yu	Herman Ho; Joseph Wei	4:12
4.	"Rescue Me (ft. Hubert Wu)"	Ronald Ng; Cheung Cho Kiu; Brian Tsang	Ng	4:16
5.	"Let It Be"	Cheung; Chang	Ho; Wei	3:42
6.	"Waiting"	David Mann	Wei	3:19
7.	"Confession"	Mahmood Rumjahn; Yip Hon Leung	Ho; Wei	3:45
8.	"Stand By"	Lam Lok Man	Ho; Edward Chan; Randy Chow	3:19
9.	"Cruel To Be Kind"	Cheung; Riley Lam	Wei	4:00
10.	"Whatever Meaningless Love Mandarin Version"	Poon; Chang	Wei	3:54
11.	"I Understand I Learned Mandarin Version"	Cheung; Chang	Wei	4:03
Total length:				42:30

== Music Videos ==
Date	Title	Note
22 April 2013	I Learned on YouTube	1st single
6 May 2013	I Understand on YouTube	
7 July 2013	Smoke on YouTube	2nd single
6 September 2013	Meaningless Love on YouTube	3rd single
9 September 2013	Whatever on YouTube	

== Critical reception ==
Professional ratings
Review scores
Source	Rating
Douban Music	7.2/10
Xiami Music	8.9/10

It received generally positive feedback. A commentator from Douban Music praised the songwriting of the songs but criticized the arrangement. The commentator also criticized the lack of distinct catchy melodies as they are generally in the same style, though "Rescue Me" was considered the highlight of the album for its catchy melody. As for the cover, Ng was described as not performing well compared to Shirley Kwan. The label was also blamed as the album was too market-oriented and stifling the artist's talent. Many others praised "Smoke" for its melody and lyrics.

== Chart performance ==
=== Singles ===
Year	Title	903	RTHK	997	TVB
2013	I Learned	–	3	1	1
2013	Smoke	–	7	4	1
2013	Meaningless Love	–	–	–	–

== Awards ==
=== I Learned ===
- Jade Solid Gold Songs Selection – Winning Song
- 2013 Metro Showbiz Hit Awards – Hit Karaoke Song
- 2013 IFPI Hong Kong Sales Awards – Top 10 Digital Songs

=== I Understand ===
- 2013 Metro Radio Mandarin Music Awards – Best Original Songs
- 2013 TVB8 Mandarin Music on Demand Awards Presentation – Top 10 Songs

=== Rescue Me ===
- 2013 Metro Showbiz Hit Awards – Best Collaboration
