= Angel In-the-Making =

Hong Kong television series

- Official poster
- Also known as: Intern Nurses
- 實習天使
- Genre: Medical drama
- Created by: Hong Kong Television Broadcasts Limited
- Written by: Yip Ho-ching
- Starring: Tony Hung; Eliza Sam; Pal Sinn; Toby Leung; Alice Chan; Elaine Yiu; Joel Chan; Moon Lau; Lena Wong; Momo Ng; Jinny Ng; William Chak; Hugo Wong; Toby Leung
- Theme music composer: Damon Chui
- Opening theme: We Are All Hurt (我們都受傷) by Jinny Ng
- Country of origin: Hong Kong
- Original language: Cantonese
- No. of episodes: 25

Production
- Executive producer: Catherine Tsang
- Producer: Yip Chun-fai
- Production location: Hong Kong
- Editors: Choi Suk-yin; Chung Yai-sin
- Camera setup: Multi camera
- Running time: 45 minutes
- Production company: TVB

Original release
- Network: TVB Jade, HD Jade
- Release: 30 November – 27 December 2015

Angel In-the-Making
- Chinese: 實習天使
- Literal meaning: "Intern Nurses "
Transcriptions
Standard Mandarin
- Hanyu Pinyin: Shí Xí Tiān Shǐ
Yue: Cantonese
- Yale Romanization: Saht Jaahp Tīn Sí
- Jyutping: Sat6 Zaap6 Tin1 Si2

Angel In-the-Making (Chinese: 實習天使; Jyutping: Sat6 Zaap6 Tin1 Si2; Cantonese Yale: Saht Jaahp Tīn Sí; literally "Intern Angel"; nurses are referred to as "angels in white" in Chinese) is a 2015 Hong Kong medical television drama created and produced by TVB. It stars Tony Hung and Eliza Sam as the main leads, with Pal Sinn, Alice Chan and Elaine Yiu as the major supporting cast. The drama was broadcast on Hong Kong's Jade and HD Jade channels from November 30 till December 27, 2015 every Monday through Sunday during its 9:30–10:30 pm timeslot with a total of 25 episodes.

== Synopsis ==
Intern nurses must endure the difficult task they are faced with when they are under the supervision of the male nurse from hell.

It has always been cheerful and caring Halley Kei's (Eliza Sam) dream to become a nurse. Ever since she was young, she has played pretend nurse, tending and caring sick patients. However, her first day as an intern nurse goes wrong in every possible way. First she is almost late and then she is put in charge of an unruly patient, who is a small-time triad boss. Her patient becomes paranoid that someone is trying to kill him, gets high on cocaine in the hospital bathroom, and then tries to escape from the hospital while almost dying all in one day. Luckily, her patient is stopped and saved by the new nurse mentor Ray Yeung (Tony Hung).

Ray Yeung lives a strange isolated life. Still traumatized by the death of his parents and older brother in front of him when he was young, he does not like to socialize with people and is nicknamed "Death Ray" by all his colleagues because he is extremely hated by his co-workers and of his stern blunt personality. Even with his unlikable personality, he is still highly respected by the hospital's chief of staff because of his excellent work ethics and is invited to work at the hospital as the new intern nurses mentor.

Ray immediately singles out Halley on their first day because of the way she handled her patient and tells her she will surely fail her internship. Feeling they did no wrong and not taking Ray's criticism kindly, all the new intern nurses band together to have Ray remove as their mentor since they feel Ray is setting them up to fail. The Chief of staff, however, sides with Ray and tell the intern nurses that Ray is just pushing them to their full potential. What the intern nurses don't know is Ray is actually a very dedicated nurse who want the new intern nurses to take their training seriously and defends them when the doctors tries to blame them for mistakes.

When Ray helps Halley with a patient that is having marital issues, she starts to see the good in him. As Halley discovers Ray's good side, others still think he has evil intent, especially senior doctor Kennedy Tong (Pal Sinn) who suspects Ray killed his younger half-brother to steal his fortune. With the help of colleague Defea Cha (Alice Chan) and Arthur's ex-girlfriend Sylvia To (Elaine Yiu), Kennedy fights Ray in court to have the will which his brother left everything to Ray voided. However, Ray is not fazed by Kennedy's actions and decide to play mind games with Kennedy. During the day of the court hearing, it is revealed that Kennedy's half-brother had a secret life style and everything Ray had done was planned by Kennedy's half-brother to get Kennedy to put his pride aside and desire to fight for his fortune since Kennedy held a grudge against their late father for leaving his mother.

Halley's good feelings for Ray continues to grow when he saves her life from one of her father's obsessively deranged student who is in love with her father and thinks Halley is the reason that her father is rejecting her advances. She tries to kill Halley, but accidentally stabs Ray who is trying to restrain her. Ray almost dies from his injuries but thinking back to the car accident that took his family brings him back to life. Feeling responsible, Halley takes care of Ray and helps him recover. During this time, Ray gives Halley the ultimate test by having her nurse the mother who abandoned her. Her mother not only needs her care but also her kidney. The relationship between mother and daughter is tense as Halley finds out why her mother was never and does not want to be a part of her life. With Ray's urging of Halley to see her mother, she finds out the reason why her mother must have her kidney and agrees to donate one to her. After the ordeal, Halley gets what she always wished for, a relationship with and knowing her mother.

Just as everything is looking up for Halley, Ray finds himself in a dark place when he finds the culprit behind the cause of his family's death, Dr. Lung, a respected senior doctor that heads the Accident and emergency unit at the same hospital Ray works at. Mad with revenge on his mind, he starts to hallucinate his deceased family talking to him and find ways to bring Dr. Lung to justice. After gaining evidence, he has Kennedy keep it safe for him when he is being pursued by Dr. Lung's henchmen but soon finds out Kennedy is not to be trusted. In order to gain in his career, Kennedy betrays Ray by sabotaging all evidence against Dr. Lung. Not knowing whom to trust anymore, Ray spirals further into paranoia. However Halley knowing the pain Ray is going through consoles him and keeps him company, but since he does not trust her either he uses her friends to blackmail her into helping him kidnap Dr. Lung's grandson. Ray wakes up in the hospital realizing all that happened during his revenge scheme was just part of his delusion. Finally admitting how severe his illness is he agrees to seek treatment abroad and Dr. Lung racked with guilt decides to turn himself in.

Halley passes her final exam after her third retake test and is happy to be a full-fledged nurse. However she is a bit sad as Ray is not there. With Ray gone abroad for over a year to treat his illness Halley realizes she not only misses him but also had fallen in love with him. When Ray returns he plays a trick on Halley by avoiding her and having her find him. Halley eventually finds Ray at the beach with clues of his favorite food, papaya scattered all over the sea line. Ray eventually comes out from hiding and charmingly shows his returned feelings for Halley when he attempts to kiss her. The two end with a sweet embrace in the ocean.

== Cast ==
=== Main cast ===
- Tony Hung as "Death" Ray Yeung (楊志明; Yeung Chi-ming) - male age 35
  - Marcus Lo as child Yeung Chi-ming (童年楊志明)

He survived a car accident that killed his entire family when he was a child, which left him traumatized. He has a cold and isolated demeanor which makes him unlikable with his co-workers, but because of his excellent work ethics he is invited by the hospital chief of staff Dom Cheung to mentor the new intern nurses in the Intensive Care unit. He was Arthur Tong's private nurse and being with him until he dies. He gets mad and goes ballistic whenever his family car accident that took his parents and older brother's life is mentioned. After helping Halley resolve a patient's personal life and later saving her from one of her dad's deranged students that leaves him in critical condition, Halley starts to see the good in him. Wanting to get close to him she volunteers to care for him while he recovers from his wounds. Just when she thinks a friendship is forming between the two he gives her the ultimate test by asking her to care for the mother that abandoned her. His paranoia later becomes severe, forcing him to go abroad to seek treatment. Ray returns to Hong Kong and reciprocates Halley's feelings for him when he charmingly attempts to kiss her. The two end with a sweet embrace at the beach.

- Eliza Sam as Halley Kei (祁樂; Kei Lok) - female age 23

A cheerful and caring person who has dreamt of becoming a nurse ever since she was young. Due to many first day mistakes as an intern nurse in the Intensive Care unit, she receives a stern lecture from Ray with half of her passing grade taken away. Patrick Ko's girlfriend, later ex-girlfriend. Unable to put up with Patrick's immaturity where he often refers to her as mom when she push him to be better, she finally breaks up with him after he has a one night stand with her friend Abby. She starts to notice Ray's good side when he helps her deal with a patient's marital issues and later saves her life from her dad's deranged student. She shows her gratitude by volunteering to care for him during his recovery but instead he gives her the ultimate test by having her be the personal nurse of her dying mother who abandoned her and now wants to buy or have Halley donate a kidney to her. Missing Ray during his time abroad to seek treatment, she realizes that she had fallen in love with him. When Ray returns from his treatment he reciprocates his love for Halley when he charmingly attempts to kiss her and the two end up together with a sweet embrace at the beach.

- Pal Sinn as Kennedy Tong (唐日俊; Tong Yat-chun) - male age 50

A caring doctor in the Accident and Emergency unit that thoroughly checks the patients. He and Defea are friends and often help each other out at the hospital while they were ex-lovers and joined the fight against SARS. Arthur Tong's older half-brother of same father but different mothers. He has a somewhat estrange relationship with Arthur due to their past fight to inherit their father's fortune. He becomes enemies with Ray when his late brother Arthur leaves his entire fortune to Ray. After finding out Arthur's true life he and Sylvia form a close friendship. He and Defea finally reconcile their relationship and become engaged. The two also have a daughter together.

- Alice Chan as Defea Cheuk (卓芷君; Cheuk Tsz-kwan) - female age 38

A senior nurse in the Accident and Emergency unit. She strictly goes by the rules and refuses to bend even if she is faced with a difficult patient. She is in an unhappy marriage because her husband feels she is more devoted to her career than family. She still has lingering feelings for Kennedy but stays in her unhappy marriage for the sake of her daughter who suffers from mental instability. Also her husband and her made a deal that the two will pretend to be a happy family for his political career until their daughter becomes a grown adult. Fed up with her husband's lies and homosexual affair with his staff, she leaves and later divorces him. She later reconciles with Kennedy and the two start a family together.

- Elaine Yiu as Sylvia To (杜羨花; To Sin-fa) - female age 35

A nurse in the Intensive Care unit. She was the new intern nurses mentor until Ray came along. She does not get along with Ray due to a bad work history and blaming him for Arthur breaking up with her. She is also Arthur Tong Yat-wah's ex-girlfriend. After finding out Arthur passed away she and Kennedy form a close friendship to reminisce about Arthur at first. The two later start a relationship when Kennedy moves on from Defea, but Sylvia stops it from further progressing since Kennedy has a history of commitment issues and senses that Kennedy and Defea still have feelings for each other. She moves abroad but when she returns she tells Kennedy that during their brief relationship she became pregnant with his daughter. Defea is aware of Kennedy and her having a child together.

=== Hang Yan Hospital staff ===
Intern nurses

*Together with Halley, they call themselves the TUNS 6. TUNS (Trainee University Nurse Student) is a Hong Kong term for intern nurses.

- Moon Lau as Abby Tang (鄧勵幀; Tang Lai-ching) - female age 23

An intern nurse in the Accident and Emergency unit. Halley's tomboyish best friend. She is also Defea's sister-in-law. Her close friendship with Halley's boyfriend Patrick Ko leads to a drunken one nightstand which Halley finds out from Alison. Eventually, she and Halley reconcile just before Patrick's death.

- MoMo Wu as Eliza Wong (汪佩儀; Wang Pui-yee) - female age 23

A new intern nurse under the mentorship of Ray. She likes to cut corners and falsely write up patients progress reports in order to get her work done on time. After saving a little girl in a car accident she starts to realize how important nurses are and takes her internship seriously.

- Jinny Ng as Alison Yu (俞玥愛; Yu Yuet-ngoi) - female age 23

An intern nurse in the Intensive Care unit. She highly looked up to Ray because he had guts to honest and bluntly tell people the truth until she made a mistake and received a stern lecture from him. She likes to divulge patients information on Facebook to receive likes. Afraid of failing she agrees to be Ray's spy. Chan Ba-sui has a crush on her but she has a crush on Dr. Jason Chow who does not treat her with respect.

- Oil Chan as Chan Ba-sui (陳拔萃) - male age 23

A new male intern nurse who works alongside Halley and is under Ray's mentorship. He is afraid to work the night shift because he thinks the hospital is haunted. He has a crush on Alison but she does not return his feelings

- Kevin Tong as Dylan Chu (朱世勤; Chu Sai-kan) - male age 23

A new male intern nurse in the Accident and Emergency unit. Patrick Ko's best friend who likes to make Youtube videos with him. He wants to be a singer and Ray reports him when he tries to pass a demo CD to patient Chi Lung, who is a newbie pop singer. He later has the opportunity to become a singer but cannot choose between becoming a nurse or pursuing his dream of becoming a singer.

Intensive care department

- Chung King-fai as Dom Cheung (張大偉; Cheung Tai-wai)

Chief of staff of the Intensive care unit. He highly respects Ray and invites him to work at the hospital putting in charge of the new intern nurses. He is also Ray's mentor and has Ray also secretly keep tabs of everyone in the Intensive care unit. He also consoled Ray and took him in when Ray's family died. He later has terminal lung cancer and eventually dies.

- Hugo Wong as Jason Chow (周景臣; Chow Geng-san)

A doctor who sees nurses as a nuisance. He does not respect nurses since he sees them as mistake makers, giving doctors more work. After Sylvia helps him out he later develops a crush on her and tries to pursue her, but moves on to Alison when he knows of her crush on him. Disrespectful to Alison in front of his friends she dumps him in front of his friends.

- English Tang as Lam Gwai-chung (林貴昌)

A senior doctor and Dr. Jason Chow's supervisor. He becomes a patient at the hospital when he faints during work. After living life as a patient he becomes a more approachable doctor to his patients.

- LuLu Kai as Miss Cho (曹火火; Cho Fo-fo)

A nurse who works alongside Sylvia and Ray. She also does not like Ray because of his cold, stern and blunt behavior.

- Ceci So as So Yuk-kuen (蘇玉娟)

A middle aged nurses assistant who is always busy and does not take orders from the new intern nurses.

- Lena Wong as Arian Kam (金雅恩; Kam Nga-yan)

An intern doctor under the mentorship of Dr. Chow Geng-san. She is Alison Yu's school rival as both fought to be the best in class.

- Jenny Wong as Lan Cheng-sam (林靜心)

A nurses assistant. She is kind and brings food to homeless people when she is off shift.

- Tony Chui as Hui Hui (許栩)

A male nurse that works the night shift. He is also Chan Ba-sui's idol because he tended to him when he was younger.

- Eric Chung as Chui Lap-kee (崔立基)

A male nurses assistant that works the night shift.

- Vincent Cheung as Ho Kwok-chung (何國聰)
- Even Chan as Chung May-kam (鍾美琴)
- GoGo Cheung as Ling Suet-yee (凌雪兒)

Accident and emergency department

- Henry Yu as Lung Yau-san (龍有生)
  - Stefan Wong as young Lung Yau-san (青年龍有生)

Head of the Accident and Emergency unit. He offers Defea the opportunity to manage a nurse clinic outside of the hospital. He caused the death of Ray's entire family due to driving erratically while driving his in labor pregnant wife to the hospital and then leaving the scene of the accident without seeking help and then hiding all evidence linking him to it. Racked with guilt and seeing how severe Ray's illness is he eventually turns himself over to the authorities.

- Mary Hon as Lorna Dai (戴利群; Dai Lai-kwan)

A senior doctor and Ko Fan's mother. She is in competition with Kennedy for a promotion and lets one of the doctor's that side with her use false rumors to help her. She did not take patients illnesses seriously until her son contracted a deadly virus and later dies.

- William Chak as Mo Chi-fung (巫志峰)

A doctor that works the ER night shift. He and Noddie eventually get married.

- Lily Poon as Ko Yuk-ha (高玉霞)

A nurse that is highly against the nurse clinic that the hospital wants to start up because she feels nurses should only assist doctors and not try to play the role of doctors.

- Mak Ka-lun as Sam Yung (容易森; Yung Ye-sam)

A doctor that does not thoroughly give a full check up to his patient. Jealous of Kennedy and Defea's recognition at work and not wanting Kennedy to be promoted to a higher position in the hospital he spreads a rumor that Kennedy and Defea are having an affair.

- Marcus Kwok as Ching Wan-sing (程宏勝)

A doctor that works the ER night shift.

- King Lam as Lung Chung-on (龍頌安)

Lung Yau-san's son. A heart surgeon that just returned from abroad.

- Doris Chow as Yip Chi-kei (葉梓琪)
- Samantha Chuk as Fan Siu-lin (范少蓮)
- Vicky Chan as Angie

=== Extended cast ===
- Joel Chan as Arthur Tong (唐日華; Tong Yat-wah)

Tong Yat-chun's deceased younger half-brother and Sylvia To's deceased ex-boyfriend. He is also Ray's best friend. He has liver cancer but chose to pursue his interest in sailing than seek treatment. He is also a closeted cross dresser that goes by the name Veronica. He left his fortune to Ray so his older half-brother Kennedy would let go of family grudges and fight for the family fortune since Kennedy was too pride to take money from the Tong family.

- Ram Chiang as Nasa Kei (祁仁; Kei Yan homophone of extremely talented man 奇人)

Halley's single-father. Nicknamed Nasa by his students because he teaches cosmic astronomy. Not wanting to tell Halley what happened to her mother he uses a transmitter radio and pretends to be her mother to communicate with her. When Halley finds out it was him with her on the transmitter radio he has his student Fanny pretend to be Halley's mother on the radio. However his student Fanny turned out to be deranged and obsess with him.

- Toby Leung as Noddy Siao (邵絲姬; Siao Si-gei)

An ER nurse who works alongside Kennedy and Defea. She is also Abby and Dylan's mentor. She is professional at work but has a very active party life after work. She and Mo Chi-fung eventually get married.

- Jay Fung as Patrick Ko (高勛; Ko Fan)

Halley's immature lazy boyfriend and Dr. Dai Lai-kwan's son. He likes to make videos and post them on YouTube to receive likes. Wanting freedom he does not have or want a regular job and only wants to make YouTube videos. Mad at Halley for not giving him freedom he has a drunken night with Abby which leads to a one night stand. No longer able to put up with his immaturity Halley finally breaks up with him. While helping a stranger he contracts the H9N2 virus and later dies from it.

- Lily Li as Chan Yut-ying (陳月英)

Abby Tang's mother and Defea Cha's mother-in-law. She is very close to her granddaughter, which upsets Defea since her daughter chooses her grandmother over her. She almost became seriously ill due to eating wild mushrooms.

- Stephen Ho as Dang Dou-han (鄧道恒)

Defea Cha's husband and Abby Tang's older brother. He is a local politician. He and Defea are in an unhappy marriage as the two constantly fight on how their daughter is being raised. He and Defea put on a pretend happy marriage and family life for the public because of his political career when in actuality she still has lingering feelings for Kennedy and he is a closeted homosexual who is having an affair with one of his male staff.

- Chow Hei-ting as Dang Hiu-ching (鄧曉晴)

Defea Cha and Dang Dou-han's preteen daughter. She is mentally unstable and does things she does not remember or say things she insist is true that is from her imagination. Due to mental issues she attends regular psychotherapy sessions at the hospital. After her parents divorce she moves out with her mother.

- Candice Chiu as Fanny Fan (芬妮; Fan nei)

Nasa's student in his astronomy class. Nasa has her pretend to be Halley's mother on a transmitter radio. When Halley finds out the truth and no longer talks to her daily Fanny becomes mentally unstable due to her obsession with Nasa. When Nasa does not return feelings for her she tries to kill him but later also Halley as she thinks Halley is the reason Nasa rejects her love.

- Cecilia Fong as Francis Chiang To (蔣杜美慧; Chiang To May-wai)

Halley's mother. She comes back into Halley and Nasa's life because she needs a kidney transplant and wants Halley to donate or sell one to her. She does not love or want a relationship with Halley since Halley was the result of a brief fling with Nasa before she married her rich husband. She blames Halley for her unhappy family life because her husband wanted to divorce her after finding out she previously had a child by another man. She desperately needs Halley's kidney to live on in order to care for her special needs daughter she loves that she had with her husband.

- Raymond Chiu as Ray's father (楊志明爸爸)

Ray's late father who was killed in a car accident which he was driving while telling his kids to behave.

- Kayi Cheung as Ray's mother (楊志明媽媽)

Ray's late mother who was killed in a car accident along with her husband and oldest son.

- Iva Law as Marie

One of Kennedy Tong's ex-girlfriends. A single un-wed mother dumped by her recent boyfriend. She leaves her baby daughter with Kennedy hoping he will adopt and raise her.

- Rainbow Ching as Yue Bik-chu (余碧珠)
  - Mandy Lam as young Yue Bik-chu (青年余碧珠)

Lung Yau-san's wife and Lung Chung-on's mother.

=== Patients and patient's family ===
- Otto Chi as Lau Yu-fai (劉耀輝)

A small time triad boss who goes to the hospital after getting into a fight with a rival gang.

- Ho Chun Hin as Dai Mai (大咪)

Lau Yu-fai's rival gang leader. He also goes to the ER to seek treatment for fighting injuries.

- Chan Wing-chun as Ho Wing-keung (何永強)

A middle aged male patient Halley's forms a friendship with.

- Shally Tsang as Mrs. Ho (何太)

Ho Wing-keung's wife.

- Andy Lau Tin-lung as Wong Kwok-lap (黃國立)

A patient in the intensive care ward.

- Adam Ip as Wong Dai-hing (王大興)

A vomiting patient waiting at the ER with his wife.

- Fanny Lee as Mrs. Wong (王太)

Wong Dai-Hing's wife. She becomes impatient waiting with her husband at the ER.

- Miguel Choi as Mr. Liu (廖生)

Father of a young boy that is physically abused by his older sister.

- Amy Ng as Mrs. Liu (廖太)

Mother of a young boy that is physically abused by his older sister.

- Aaryn Cheung as Chi Lung (志龍)

A newbie pop singer with an eating disorder.

- Man Yeung as Ken Kwan (關維建; Kwan Wai-kin)

Chi Lung's gay manager who always reassures him that everything is okay.

- Choi Kwok-hing as Lo Bak (魯柏)

Lo Ching's grandfather.

- Brian Chu as Lo Ching (魯清)

Lo Bak's grandson. A suicidal youth who does not want to be burdened with his grandfather.

- Jayden Kau as Chung Shu-yan (鍾樹人)

A patient who becomes distraught after finding out he has liver cancer.

- Carlo Ng as Kei Tai-man (紀大民)

A homeless bum who is also a drug addict that Halley helps check into the hospital.

- Griselda Yeung as Mrs. Kei (紀太)

Kei Tai-man's wife. She left him due to his drug addiction and currently works as a cleaning lady at a brothel.

- Kenneth Fok as Wong Kam-fai (黃錦輝)

An illegal mainlander that is the main cause of the H9N2 virus spreading throughout Hong Kong causing citizens illness and deaths.

- Chloe Nguyen as Cheng Yui (鄭瑤)

Wong Kam-fai's girlfriend. She protects her boyfriend's whereabouts even though he beats her during his jealous rages because she is pregnant with his child.

== Development and production ==
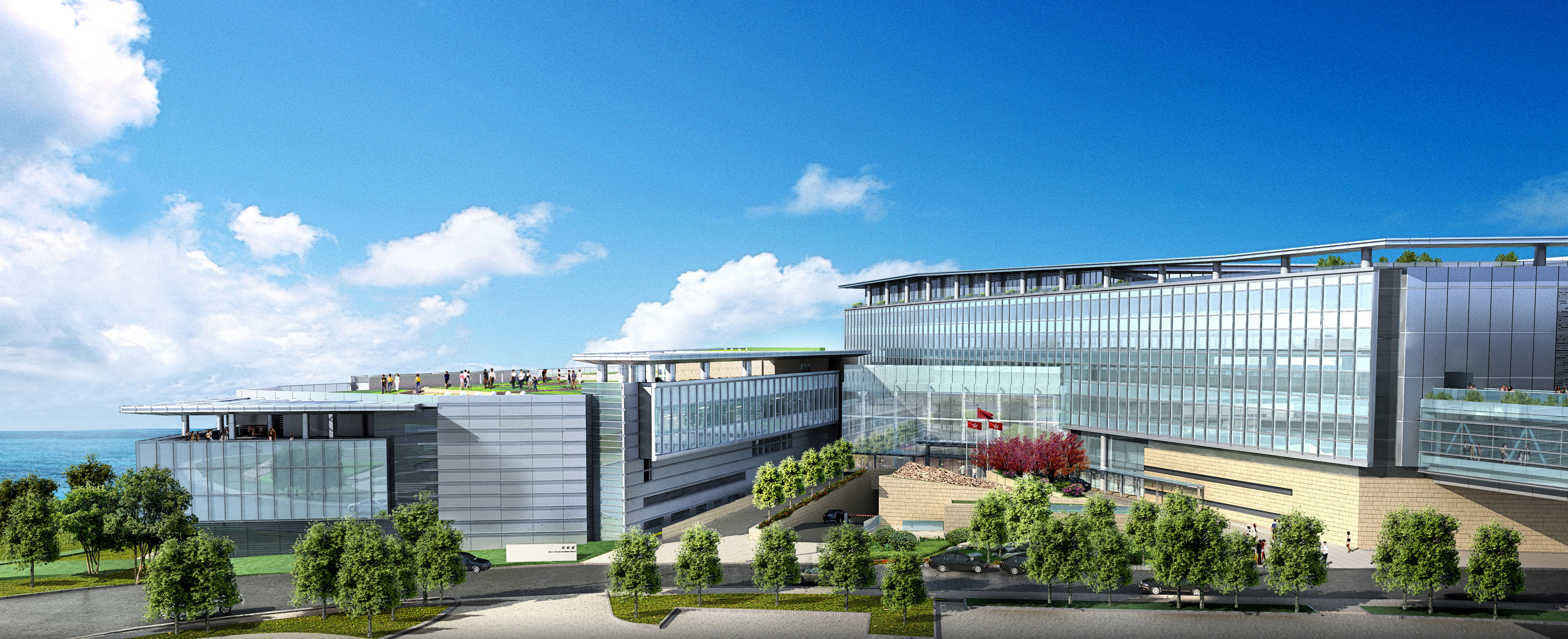
Hong Kong Civil Aviation Department Headquarters. Lantau Island, Hong Kong

- Ron Ng was originally cast in the lead role as "Death Ray", but withdrew weeks before the drama started production due to conflicting schedules and Tony Hung replaced him.
- The costume fitting and blessing ceremony was held simultaneously on June 3, 2015, 12:30 pm at Tseung Kwan O TVB City Studio One Common Room.
- Filming took place from June till October 2015, entirely on location in Hong Kong.
- The Hong Kong Civil Aviation Department Headquarters building and lobby was used as the exterior for Hang Yan hospital.

== Viewership ratings ==
Timeslot (HKT)	#	Day(s)	Week	Episode(s)	Average points	Peaking points
Mon - Sun (9:30-10:30 pm); 21:30–22:30	1	Mon - Fri	30 Nov - 04 Dec 2015	1 — 5	24	--
Mon - Sun (9:30-10:30 pm); 21:30–22:30	1	Sun	06 Dec 2015	6	20	--
Mon - Sun (9:30-10:30 pm); 21:30–22:30	2	Mon - Fri	07 - 11 Dec 2015	7 — 11	22	24
Mon - Sun (9:30-10:30 pm); 21:30–22:30	2	Sat	12 Dec 2015	12	18	--
Mon - Sun (9:30-10:30 pm); 21:30–22:30	3	Mon - Fri	14 - 18 Dec 2015	13 — 17	22	--
Mon - Sun (9:30-10:30 pm); 21:30–22:30	3	Sat	19 Dec 2015	18	17	--
Mon - Sun (9:30-10:30 pm); 21:30–22:30	4	Mon - Fri	21 - 25 Dec 2015	19 — 23	23	
Mon - Sun (9:30-10:30 pm); 21:30–22:30	4	Sat	26 Dec 2015	24	19	
Mon - Sun (9:30-10:30 pm); 21:30–22:30	4	Sun	27 Dec 2015	25	25	26
Total average					22.16	26

December 5, 2015: No episode broadcast due to airing of 2015 Tung Wah Charity Show.
December 13, 2015: No episode broadcast due to airing of 2015 TVB Anniversary Awards ceremony.
December 20, 2015: No episode broadcast due to airing of 2015 Jade Solid Gold Best Ten Music Awards Presentation.

== International broadcast ==
Network	Country	Airing Date	Timeslot
Astro On Demand	Malaysia	November 30, 2015	Monday – Sunday 9:30 – 10:30 pm
TVBJ	Australia	December 1, 2015	Monday – Sunday 12:30 – 1:30 am
Starhub TV	Singapore	March 7, 2016	Monday – Sunday 9:00 – 10:00 pm
