= Love Diary (Jinny Ng EP) =

EP by Jinny Ng
- Released: 9 November 2010
- Recorded: 2010
- Genre: Cantopop
- Length: 30:03
- Label: Stars Shine International
- Producer: Johnny Yim; Alan Cheung; Ronald Ng

Jinny Ng chronology
| Love Diary (2010) | Blue Sky (2012) |

Singles from Love Diary
- 1. "The Moviegoer" Released: 6 June 2010; 2. "Be Strong" Released: 13 November 2010; 3. "The Child's Eyes" Released: 24 June 2011; 4. "I'm Glad I'm Missed" Released: 24 June 2011

Love Diary is the debut EP from Hong Kong singer Jinny Ng. It was released on 9 November 2010. She has received the Best Sales Local New Female Vocalist from IFPI Hong Kong Sales Awards because of the album.

== Background ==
Jinny Ng was known by the Hong Kong public because of the duet with Enzo, which received the Top Metro Mandarin Songs. Later, she released Love Diary with 8 songs, 2 music videos and 1 behind-the-scene video.

== Track listing ==
CD
| No. | Title | Writer(s) | Producers | Length |
|---|---|---|---|---|
| 1. | "I'm Glad I Missed" | 廖卓瑩; 王仲傑 | Johnny Yim | 3:57 |
| 2. | "Be Strong" | Alan Cheung; 王仲傑 | Cheung | 3:55 |
| 3. | "The Child's Eyes" | Dominic Chu; 王仲傑 | Ronald Ng | 3:45 |
| 4. | "The Moviegoer" | Johnathan Wong; Riley Lam | Ronald | 3:39 |
| 5. | "Outside The Window (Mandarin)" | Alan Cheung; Jinny Ng | Johnny Yim | 3:20 |
| 6. | "My Big Day" | Joanus Lam; Louis Cheung | Goro Wong | 3:43 |
| 7. | "Why" | Alex Lung; 王仲傑 | Cheung | 4:05 |
| 8. | "Listen To Movies (Mandarin)" | Johnathan Wong; Kevin Yee | Ronald | 3:36 |
| Total length: | | | | 30:03 |

DVD
| No. | Title | Length |
|---|---|---|
| 1. | "Be Strong" (music video) |
| 2. | "Making of Love Diary EP" |

== Music videos ==
| # | Date | Title | Note |
|---|---|---|---|
| 1 | 6 June 2010 | The Moviegoer on YouTube | Lead single Not included in the EP |
| 2 | 13 November 2010 | Be Strong on YouTube | 2nd single |
| 3 | 25 December 2010 | My Big Day on YouTube | Not included in the EP |
| 4 | 24 June 2011 | The Child's Eyes on YouTube | 3rd single Not included in the EP |
| 5 | 24 June 2011 | I'm Glad I'm Missed on YouTube | 4th single Not included in the EP |
| 6 | 24 June 2011 | Outside The Window on YouTube | Not included in the EP |

== Chart performance ==
=== Singles ===
| Song | 903 | RTHK | 997 | TVB |
|---|---|---|---|---|
| The Moviegoer | 12 | 12 | 5 | 6 |
| I'm Glad I Missed | 17 | – | 5 | 3 |
| Be Strong | – | – | 6 | – |
