= Jinny Ng =

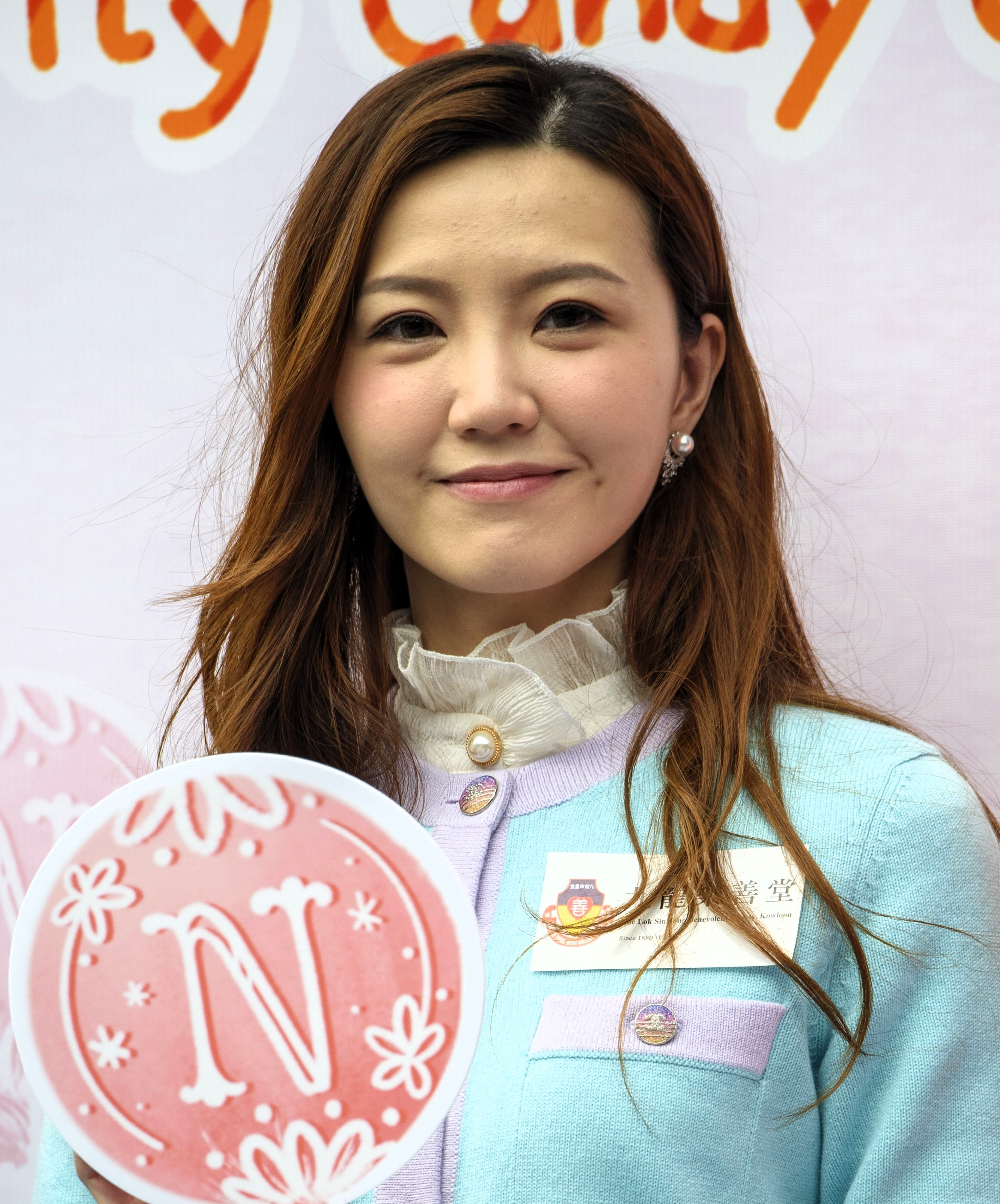
- Ng in 2024
- Born: Ng Ka Nei (吳嘉妮); 23 May 1992 (age 34); Fuzhou, Fujian, China
- Occupations: Singer; musician; actress; hostess
- Years active: 2010–present
- Spouse: Alex Ho (m. 2017)
- Children: Giselle Ho (daughter) b. 23 April 2017; Kylian Ho (son) b. 3 November 2020

Chinese name
- Traditional Chinese: 吳若希
- Simplified Chinese: 吴若希
Transcriptions
Standard Mandarin
- Hanyu Pinyin: Wú Ruòxī
Yue: Cantonese
- Jyutping: Ng4 Joek6 Hei1
- Musical career
- Origin: Hong Kong, China
- Genres: Cantopop, Mandopop
- Instruments: Piano, ukulele
- Labels: Craze Music (2010); Stars Shine International (2010–2013); Voice Entertainment→TVB Music Group (2014–2024); All About Music (2024-Present)

Jinny Ng Yeuk Hei (Chinese: 吳若希; born 23 May 1992) is a Hong Kong Cantopop singer, hostess and actress. She is currently a singer with All About Music and an actress with TVB. She was born in Mainland China and moved to Hong Kong along with her family at the age of nine. She has risen to prominence since 2014 as she performed several theme songs and hosted TV programs for TVB.

== Career ==
=== 2008: Discovery ===
In 2008, 16-year-old Jinny Ng was discovered by an agent while singing in karaoke with her friends. She had been secretly trained to sing and play instruments for two years before her start in music career, which was a tough time she had undergone.

=== 2010: Start of music career and debut album ===
Early in 2010, Ng and Enzo Siu chorused the song "Love@Earth", which marked the start of her music career. On 8 November 2010, she released her debut EP Love Diary, which has received positive criticisms.

=== 2011: Chorus single and several awards ===
In 2011, Ng released the single "Intimate" (《知己》), which was chorused with Alfred Hui. It became a hit single as it reached to the peak of TVB Chart of pop songs and was awarded several times.

=== 2012: Second album and illnesses ===
On 28 May 2012, Ng released her second album Blue Sky, which contained eight new Cantonese songs. In early July, she had a stomachache and went to the hospital for emergency. Later while participating in a public activity, she felt dizzy and visited a private doctor. After a careful inspection, it was found that she had a tumor in her stomach. She followed the doctor's advice and underwent surgery to remove the tumor. Subsequently she found there was a callus in her throat.

=== 2013: Third album ===
On 26 June 2013, Ng released her third album I Learned.

=== 2014–present: Retrospective album and rise to fame ===
From the start of 2014, Ng joined Voice Entertainment from Stars Shine International and contracted with TVB. She sang several theme songs for TVB dramas, including A Time of Love, Storm in a Cocoon, Swipe Tap Love and Line Walker. Her song Love Is Not Easy is used as an insert theme for the drama series Line Walker, which only made the song and show more popular with audiences. On 27 November 2014, Jinny Ng released her fourth album, a Retrospective album called Love Collection: Love Is Not Easy, which includes her theme songs and classics in her previous albums.

Ng is also a hostess in TVB programmes such as All Things Girl and Jade Solid Gold. Additionally, she has begun to act in some TVB dramas such as Come On, Cousin, My "Spiritual" Ex-Lover, Young Charioteers and Angel In-the-Making.

On 18 January 2015, in the 2014 Jade Solid Gold Awards Presentation, Ng's "Love Is Not Easy" won the award of Golden Song, which denotes it as the best song among the other awarded songs. The song has been known by one and all and widely named the "brainwash song". It also has a Vietnamese version.

== Personal life ==
In July 2016, Ng admitted her relationship with out of industry boyfriend Alex Ho. In November, she announced her pregnancy and gave birth to their daughter, Giselle, in late April 2017. On 10 October, Ng officially got married with Ho. In June 2020, she announced her second pregnancy and gave birth their son, Kylian, in November.

== Discography ==
- Blue Sky (2012)
- I Learned (2013)
- The Secret of Tears (2016)
- Priceless Love (2020)

== Filmography ==
=== Television dramas ===
TV Dramas (TVB)
Year	Name	Role	Note
2014	Come On, Cousin	Lam Pik-kiu 林碧嬌	Guest Appearance
2015	My "Spiritual" Ex-Lover	Ying Chun-kiu 迎春嬌	Major Supporting Role
2015	Young Charioteers	Wu Sum-nam 胡芯藍	Major Supporting Role
2015	Angel In-the-Making	Alison Yu Yuet-oi 俞玥愛	Major Supporting Role
2018	Wife, Interrupted	Jill Chiu Cheuk-wing 趙卓穎	Guest Appearance
2019	Wonder Women	So Dip 蘇蝶	Supporting Role
2023	From Hong Kong to Beijing	Kwong Hoi-lun 鄺海倫	Main Role; Nominated - TVB Anniversary Award for Best Actress (Top 5); Nominated - TVB Anniversary Award for Favourite TVB Actress in Greater Bay Area; Nominated - TVB Anniversary Award for Favourite TVB Actress in Malaysia
2024	The Spectator	Lin Choi-man 練采文	Major Supporting Role

=== Films ===
- Natural Born Lovers (2012)
- The Best Plan Is No Plan (2013)
- A Secret Between Us (2013)
- Return of the Cuckoo (2015)
