= The Secret of Tears =

Studio album by Jinny Ng
- Released: 21 January 2016
- Genre: Cantopop
- Length: 40:18
- Language: Cantonese; Mandarin
- Label: Warner Music Taiwan; Voice Entertainment

Jinny Ng chronology
The Love Collection (2014)	The Secret of Tears (2015)

Singles from The Secret of Tears
- 1. "The Beautiful Times" Released: 2 March 2015; 2. "The Secret of Tears" Released: 27 April 2015; 3. "We Are All Hurt" Released: 4 November 2015

The Secret of Tears is the third studio album from Hong Kong female singer-songwriter Jinny Ng released on 21 January 2016 along with 4 postcards. It includes 11 songs, with "The Beautiful Times", "The Secret of Tears" and "We Are All Hurt" as the lead singles as well as her original work, "Letting You Go".

== Background ==
In an interview with Billboard Radio China at the time of the release, Jinny spoke about her music as a diary that records and expresses her feelings. She said her inspiration usually comes while she's taking a shower, and that for "Letting You Go", she was inspired by online content and her own experiences.

"Falling into You" is a collaboration with Dominic Chu, a friend she had known for six years.

== Track listing ==
CD
No.	Title	Writer(s)	Producers	Length
1.	"We Are All Hurt"	Damon Chui; Sandy Chang	Herman Ho; Johnny Yim	3:42
2.	"The Secret of Tears"	Alex Cheung; Chang	Ho; Joseph Wei	3:36
3.	"Love"	Cheung; Chang	Ho; Wei	3:21
4.	"The Beautiful Times"	Cheung; Chang	Ho; Wei	2:56
5.	"Letting You Go (Mandarin)"	Jinny Ng	Wei	3:49
6.	"Falling into You"	Dominic Chu	Chu	4:35
7.	"Tempted Heart"	Cheung; Chang	Ho; Wei	3:17
8.	"A Reason To Leave You"	Atsushi Kimura; Taisho	Ho; Yim	4:34
9.	"The Promise (Mandarin)"	Michael Lai; Cui Shu	Lai	3:21
10.	"Love (Mandarin Version)"	Cheung; Hayes Yeung	Wei	3:21
11.	"The Secret of Tears (Mandarin Version)"	Cheung; Lam Wing Yin	Wei	3:36
Total length:				40:18

== Music videos ==
Date	Title	Director	Note
1 April 2015	The Beautiful Times on YouTube		1st single
11 May 2015	The Secret of Tears on YouTube	JC.L	2nd single
19 November 2015	We Are All Hurt on YouTube	JC.L	3rd single
5 April 2016	Love on YouTube		
12 September 2016	Tempted Heart on YouTube		
14 February 2018	A Reason To Leave You on YouTube		

== Chart performance ==
=== Album ===
Record Sales Chart
HKRMA	HMV
1	1

=== Singles ===
Year	Title	RTHK	997	TVB
2015	The Beautiful Times	3	2	1
2015	The Secret of Tears	1	1	(1)
2015	We Are All Hurt	3	1	1

=== Other charted songs ===
Year	Title	RTHK	997	TVB
2016	Love	1	–	1
2016	Tempted Heart	–	–	3
2018	A Reason To Leave You	–	–	3

== Awards ==
=== Album ===
- 2016 IFPI Hong Kong Sales Awards – Top 10 Cantopop Albums

=== The Beautiful Times ===
- 2015 Jade Solid Gold Songs Selection Part 1 – Winning Song

=== The Secret of Tears ===
- 2015 Jade Solid Gold Songs Selection Part 1 – Winning Song
- 2015 TVB Anniversary Awards – Best Soundtrack
- 2015 Jade Solid Gold Best 10 Awards Presentation – Jade Solid Gold Best 10 Songs
- 2015 Jade Solid Gold Best 10 Awards Presentation – Jade Solid Gold Best Song
- 2015 Metro Hits Awards – Most Streamed Song
- 2015 Top Ten Chinese Gold Songs Award Concert – Top 10 Chinese Gold Songs
- 2015 TVB8 Mandarin Music on Demand Awards Presentation – Top Mandarin Songs
- 2015 TVB8 Mandarin Music on Demand Awards Presentation – Gold Songs

=== We Are All Hurt ===
- 2015 Jade Solid Gold Songs Selection Part 2 – Winning Song
- 2015 Jade Solid Gold Best 10 Awards Presentation – Jade Solid Gold Best 10 Songs

=== Love ===
- 2016 Jade Solid Gold Songs Selection Part 1 – Winning Song
