= Stars Shine International =

Stars Shine International 星煥國際有限公司
- Founded: July 3, 2010
- Founder: Herman Ho (何哲圖) (CEO)
- Defunct: December 31, 2013
- Genre: Various
- Country of origin: Hong Kong
- Location: Hong Kong
- Official website: Official website of Stars Shine International

Stars Shine International is a record music company in Hong Kong, formed in 2010.

== History ==
Established in 2010, the company started with Jade Kwan, Fala Chen and Joyce Cheng. Of the three initial artists, only the latter remain.

On March 3, 2011, Alfred Hui joined. June 28, 2011 Cilla Kung joined. November 21, 2011 Linda Chung joined.

On October 20, 2012, Elanne Kong joined.

On December 31, 2013, the company was dissolved and artists were transferred to the newly-formed The Voice Entertainment Group.

== List of Stars Shine International artists ==
- Alfred Hui
- Hubert Wu
- Kay Tse
- Joyce Cheng
- Jinny Ng
- Cilla Kung
- Linda Chung
- Super Girls
