= Alfred Hui =

Hong Kong singer and dentist

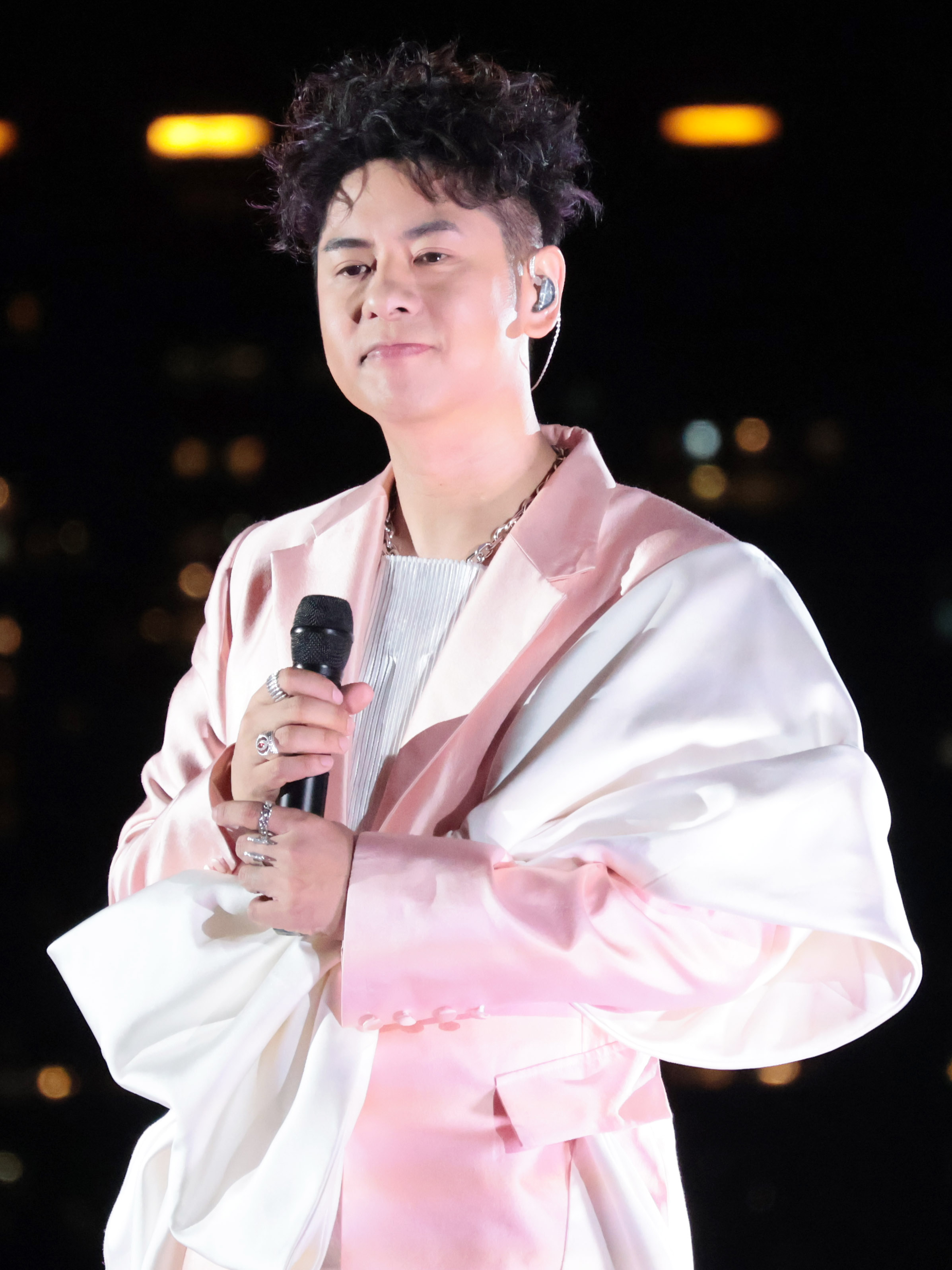
- Hui at West Kowloon Cultural District, Tsim Sha Tsui
- Born: 29 April 1988 (age 38); British Hong Kong
- Education: University of Hong Kong (BDS)
- Occupations: Actor; singer; dentist
- Years active: 2009–present

Chinese name
- Traditional Chinese: 許廷鏗
- Simplified Chinese: 许廷铿
Transcriptions
Standard Mandarin
- Hanyu Pinyin: Xǔ Tíng Kēng
Yue: Cantonese
- Jyutping: Heoi2 Ting4 Hang1
- Musical career
- Also known as: Wu Chun from Tseung Kwan O (將軍澳吳尊); Prince Ant (螞蟻王子); Little Dentist (牙醫仔)
- Genres: C-pop
- Labels: Stars Shine International (2011–2013); The Voice Entertainment Group (2014–2017); Warner Music (2017–2021); Alfrecords (2021–present)

Alfred Hui Ting Hang (born 29 April 1988) is a Hong Kong singer. He rose to prominence as the eleventh-place finalist in the first season of The Voice (Chinese: 超級巨聲). His debut studio album Departure Trilogy earned gold certification. Hui won multiple best newcomer awards in 2011. He has since released more than ten studio albums.

Hui holds a Bachelor of Dental Surgery from the University of Hong Kong, and is licensed by the Dental Council of Hong Kong since 2012.

== Early life ==
Alfred Hui Ting Hang was born on April 29, 1988, in Hong Kong. His father is Hui Yee Yung and Alfred has two older sisters and an older brother. His father was the vice-chairman of the Hong Kong Kidney Foundation. As a child, Hui aspired to be a doctor. Hui decided to pursue dentistry after job shadowing at his uncle's dental clinic for two weeks. Hui graduated from the German Swiss International School, in Hong Kong (German: Deutsch-Schweizerische Internationale Schule). He attended The University of Hong Kong, and was named HKU Sports Scholar in Soccer in 2007. Hui graduated with a Bachelor in Dental Surgery in 2012.

== Singing career ==
In 2009, Hui competed in the singing competition television series The Voice. Hui won the Most Popular Award, and placed eleventh in the competition. Hui signed with TVB as a recording artist and debuted with the song "My Departure Is Also A Kind of Love" (我的離開也是愛), the ending song to television series Gun Metal Grey.

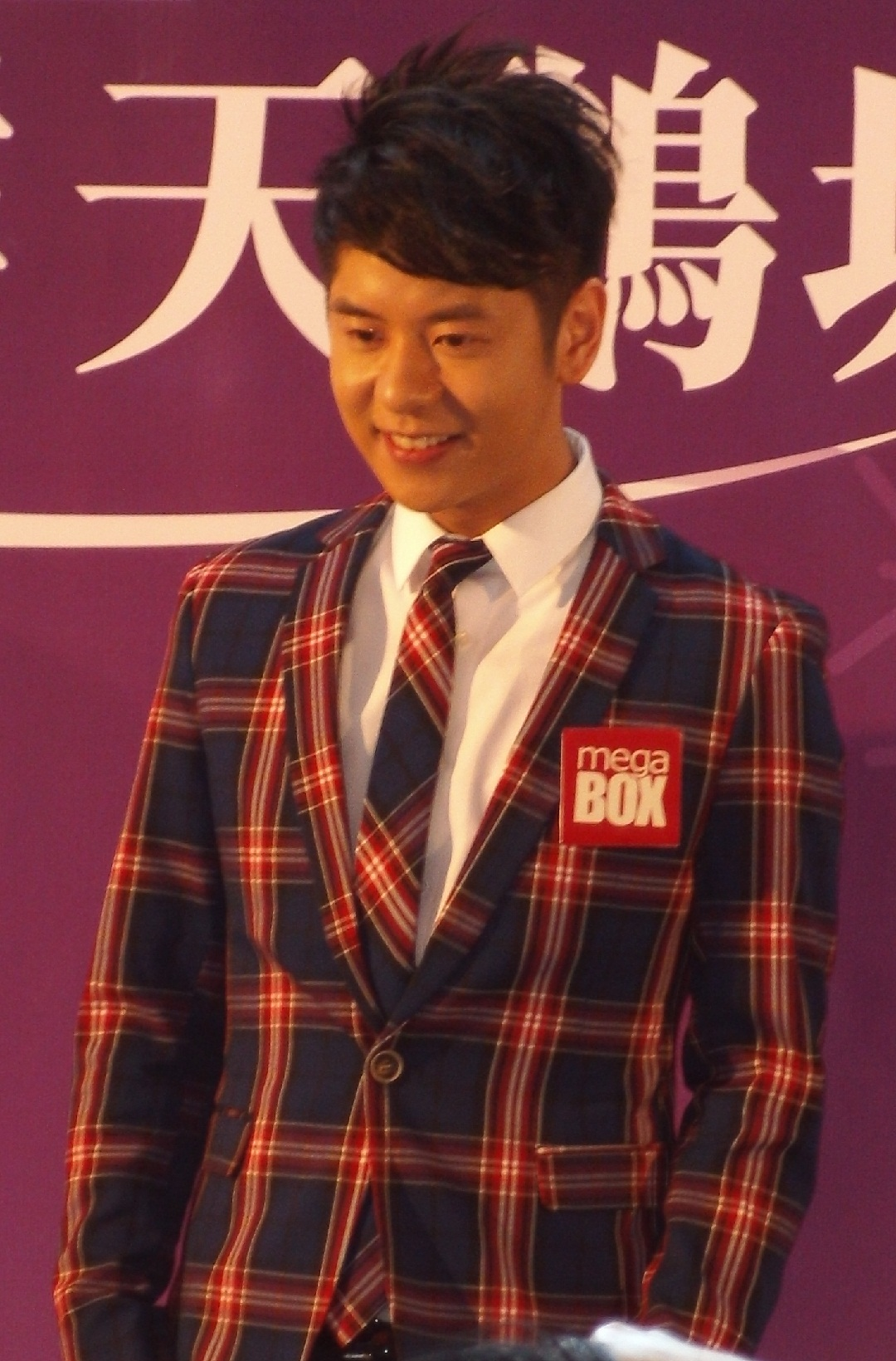
Hui in Megabox, Kowloon Bay (2011)

On 4 March 2011, Alfred Hui signed a contract with Stars Shine International (星煥國際) as a singer. On 28 June 2011, he released his debut studio album A Trilogy of Departure (Chinese: 出走三部曲). On 16 August 2011, Hui headlined his first music concert. The single "Departure" peaked at number one on the 903 Ultimate Song Chart and Jade Solid Gold music chart. Hui swept newcomer awards in 2011, winning Best Newcomer Gold Prize at the Ultimate Song Chart Awards Presentation, Best Newcomer at the Metro Radio Hits Music Awards, Best Prospects Bronze Prize at the RTHK Top 10 Gold Songs Awards, and Most Popular Newcomer (Gold) at JSG Awards Presentation.

Hui released his second studio album Blue (藍調) on January 12, 2012.

Hui represented Hong Kong to participate in the ABU TV Song Festival 2012, which was scheduled to take place at the KBS Concert Hall, in Seoul, South Korea, on 14 October 2012.

His third studio album Grandit (長大), meaning "growing up" in French, was released in December 2012. The title track "Grandit" (重新長大) was released to radio on 5 September 2012 and managed to garner top places in music charts of RTHK, Metro Radio and TVB. The single "The Ode of Youth" (青春頌), which echoes the theme of the song "Grandit" and serves as the conclusion of the album, received critical acclaim. It was released to radio on 21 February 2013. Commercially, the song remained as No.1 on Commercial Radio's music chart for two consecutive weeks, breaking a record that was held for seven years. In a radio interview, Hui revealed that the song was originally not intended to be released as a single. The result was a surprise to him.

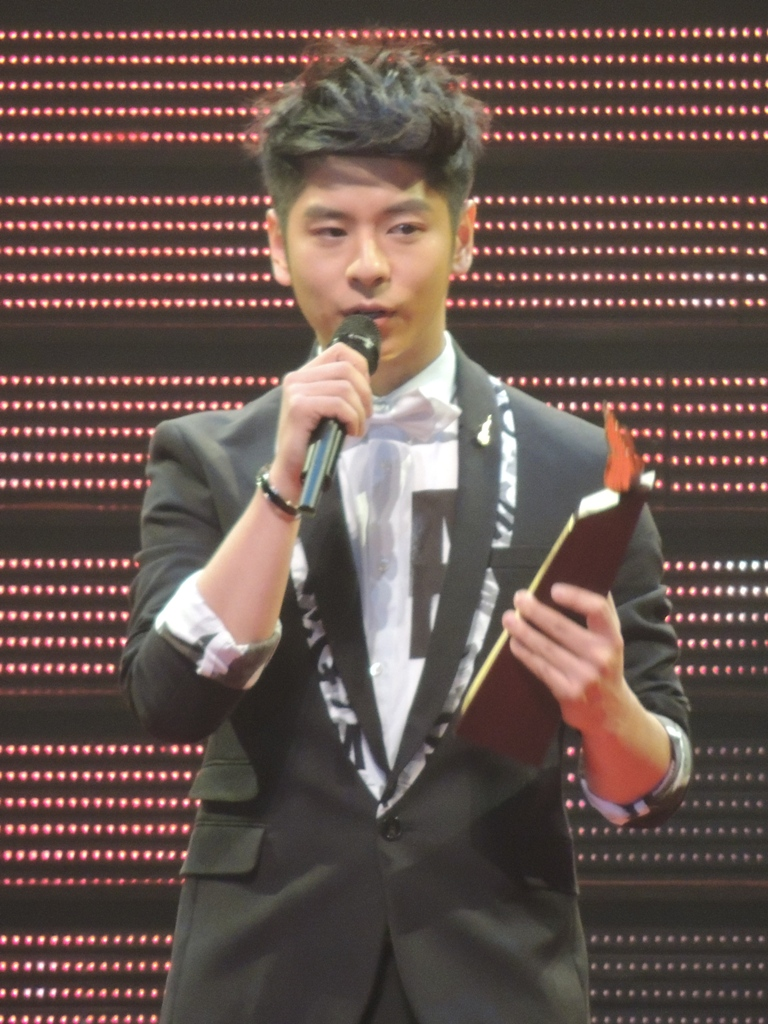
Hui in 2013

On 31 October 2013, Alfred Hui followed Herman Ho Chit-to (何哲圖), Chief Executive Officer of Stars Shine (星煥國際), to join the Voice Entertainment Group Limited (星夢娛樂). His contract was then transferred to the new company. On 20 December 2013, Hui released a compilation album The Times (時光). On 28 and 29 December 2013, The Times – Alfred Hui Solo Concert 2013 (許廷鏗時光演唱會2013) was organized at the Star Hall (匯星) of Kowloonbay International Trade & Exhibition Centre (九龍灣國際展貿中心).

On December 7, 2014, Alfred Hui's two singles "Chain" and "Blessing" ranked second and tenth respectively on the Jade Solid Gold music chart. His singles "Shelter" and "If You Were Me" also attained excellent results, peaking on three song charts.

In the music awards ceremony at the end of 2014, Hui's single "Shelter" won awards at the Metro Radio Hit Awards, RTHK Top 10 Gold Songs Awards and JSG Best 10 Awards Presentation, while Hui himself also won singer awards. His album The Times is one of the top ten best-selling Cantopop albums of the year.

In 2015, Hui released Colour By Numbers and Watermark albums in January and December respectively, each with 11 songs.

In 2016, Hui did not release any new albums, but released many songs. In early July, Alfred Hui released a single "My Aspiration" (我的志願). This was his first time directing his own music video, starring former ATV veteran actor Nina Paw. The music video attained over 140,000 views within a week. Since September 1, he has briefly participated in the cartoons drawn by cartoonist YY in Headline Daily every Thursday. Since then, the song "My Aspiration" has also become Hui's first song to peak all four song charts since his debut, while another single "If You're Here, I'm There" ranked first on three charts.

In 2017, after Hui's contract with The Voice Entertainment ended, he signed a new four-year contract with Warner Music Hong Kong. On June 12, 2017, he released his first major title "Root" (根) (feat. 2868) after joining the new record label. On October 27, 2017, he released his first album Miraculous Journey (神奇之旅) after the transfer. Songs included "Blue" (藍血人), "Miraculous Journey", "OCD" (強迫症進行曲) and "ADD" (大雄胖虎綜合症). The single "Miraculous Journey" ranked first at three song chart, while the other singles "Blue" and "Root" were released in just a few weeks and peaked at one and two charts respectively. In December, Hui released the single "If Only I Can Weep" (原來我可以哭). A series of moving short videos was made to promote the single. In particular, the Thai chapter was more heatedly discussed by Thai netizens.

In February 2018, Hui released a new single "An Actor Prepares" (演員的自我修養), which ranked first at three song charts. He then collaborated with Mark Lui to release a love song named "Devoted Lover" (恐怖情人). In May, Hui announced that he was preparing for his first concert in Hong Kong Coliseum, which was considered as an achievement by singers in Hong Kong. In August, he held a solo concert KKBOX Simply Me Simply Alfred, where he announced the confirmation of a concert at the Coliseum, which was held on March 23, 2019.

In August 2018, Hui collaborated with RubberBand's Mau Hou Cheong and released a new single "Spare A Listen" (停半分鐘聽一闋歌) as a tribute to Cantopop. In November, he released a new song "Innocence" (白紙), which was composed and produced by his friend Yu Yat Yiu. In the same month, Hui announced the release of his first self-titled album Alfred Hui on November 27.

In 2019, to commemorate his tenth year since his debut, Hui released his tenth album Ten (拾). The album won the Best Male Artist Album Award at the 43rd RTHK Top 10 Gold Songs Awards.

In 2020, Hui released a concept album Negative with the theme of "negativity". In the same year, Hui served as one of the judges in the fourth round of ViuTV's King Maker III. His frank and candid performance on the program, along with his eloquent comments received a lot of praise.

At the end of 2020, Hui won the first "Gold Award for Male Singer" in his singing career at the 2020 Ultimate Song Chart Awards Presentation. The award was regarded as one of the highest achievements in the music industry. Hui was the first male singer who debuted in the 2010s to win the award. His title song "Feebleness" (無力感) in Negative has also been listed as one of the top ten songs at the Presentation.

On March 17, 2021, Hui announced on his social network that his contract with Warner Music Hong Kong had officially expired, saying that he would focus his work as a dentist temporarily and plan to explore the Taiwanese music market after the COVID-19 pandemic. On March 31, Hui accepted an interview with TVB, and he was interviewed by TVB for the first time in nearly four years since he left.

On October 4, 2021, Hui announced the establishment of his own record label, Alfrecords. On April 29, 2022, his 34th birthday, he released his 13th album, 2021, his first album since his independence. The album is released as an LP record exclusively and only 1231 limited copies were made. The lyrics of all songs in the album was written by lyricist Albert Leung.

In January 2022, local media reported that ten Canto-pop singers and groups had been put on a blacklist of government-funded broadcaster RTHK, with radio DJs having been ordered not to play their songs. Hui was reportedly on the list. In response to a letter by lawmaker Tik Chi-yuen requesting clarification, RTHK wrote: "RTHK has been supporting the development of Chinese pop music. Program hosts choose songs based on professionalism and suitability to the programs."

== Discography ==
Albums

- 2011: Alfred Hui Debut Album (出走三部曲)
- 2012: Blue (藍調)
- 2012: Grandit (長大)
- 2013: The Times - First Collection Of Alfred Hui's Songs (時光)
- 2015: Colour by Numbers
- 2015: Watermark
- 2017: Miraculous Journey (神奇之旅)
- 2017: THE ULTIMATE New + Best Selections
- 2018: Alfred Hui
- 2019: Ten
- 2020: Negative
- 2022: 2021
- 2023: in the round

Singles

- 2022: "Anthropology"
- 2022: "Masquerade" (feat. Win Win Yeung)
- 2023: "Guilty Conscience"

== Filmography ==
=== Television shows ===
Year	Title	Network	Role	Notes/Ref.
2009	The Voice	TVB	Contestant	
2020	King Maker III	ViuTV	Judge	EP27-30
2021	A-Live	ViuTV	Host	
2021	King Maker IV	ViuTV	Mentor	

=== Television series ===
Year	Title	Network	Role	Notes
2011	Dropping By Cloud Nine	TVB		EP8

=== Film ===
Year	Title	Chinese Title	Role	Notes/Ref.
2010	Planet 51	外星51	咖喱	Cantonese dub
2019	UglyDolls	樣衰衰奇兵	Lou	Cantonese dub
2022	Life Must Go On	深宵閃避球	Lau Chi Yuen (Joyce Cheng's husband),	Cameo

== Awards ==
- 2008: 1st Runner-Up in "HKU Singing Contest 2008" organized by the University of Hong Kong
- 2010: "Award for the Highest Popularity" in "The Voice", TVB JADE Channel
- 2010: "Supervoice" as awarded song, "Jade Solid Gold Distinguished Nomination – 2nd Round", TVB JADE Channel
- 2010: "My Departure Is Also A Kind of Love" (我的離開也是愛)" as awarded song, "Jade Solid Gold Distinguished Nomination – 3rd Round", TVB JADE Channel
- 2010: 1st Runner Up in "Approaching The Youngsters – Music Contest 2010" organized by Central Multi Broadcasting (CMB) in Korea
- 2011: Bronze Award for "Excellent Performance Award", "Jade Solid Gold Prize-Giving Ceremony 2010" organized by TVB JADE Channel (All the team members from "The Voice")
- 2011: "New Singer Recommendable Award for Emerging Excellence" in "Jade Solid Gold Prize-Giving Ceremony 2010, TVB JADE Channel
- 2011: "Departure" (出走) as awarded song, "Jade Solid Gold Distinguished Nomination – 1st Round", TVB JADE Channel
- 2011: "Ant" (螞蟻) as awarded song, "Jade Solid Gold Distinguished Nomination – 2nd Round", TVB JADE Channel
- 2011: "Distinguished New Singer Award" in "Gold Award for Mandarin Music 2011"
- 2011: "Award for the Most Distinguished Young Singer" in "The 8th King of the Solid Singers – Final Round Prize Giving Ceremony" organized by RTHK
- 2011: "A Close Friend" (知己) as "Award for the Most Distinguished Chorus Song" in "The 8th King of the Solid Singers – Final Round Prize Giving Ceremony" organized by RTHK
- 2011: "Youth Award for the Most Favorite Chorus Song" in "uChannel – I Support Pop Music Circuit – Prize Giving Ceremony 2011"
- 2011: "Award for Vanguard Young Singer" in "Music Vanguard List – Prize Giving Ceremony 2011"
- 2011: "A Close Friend" (知己) as awarded song, "Jade Solid Gold Distinguished Nomination – 3rd Round", TVB JADE Channel
- 2011: "Prince Award", "FACE Magazine Trendy Icons & Brand Supporting Awards 2011"
- 2011: "Ant" (螞蟻) as awarded song, "YAHOO! - Popular People Searching Award 2011"
- 2011: "Award for High Popularity & New Influence", "YAHOO! - Hot People Searching Award 2011"
- 2011: "Metro Broadcast Award for New Male Singer", "Metro Broadcast Prize Giving Ceremony for Popular Music 2011"
- 2011: "Ant" (螞蟻) as an awarded song for "Metro Broadcast Award for Original & Creative Song", "Metro Broadcast Prize Giving Ceremony for Popular Music 2011"
- 2012: Gold Award, "903 Music Gold Award for Young Singer", "903 Music Prize Giving Ceremony 2011", Hong Kong Commercial Broadcasting Corporation Limited
- 2012: "Award for My Most Favourite New Male Singer", "Sina Music Prize Giving Ceremony 2011"
- 2012: Bronze Award, "Award for New Singer with Greatest Prospect", "The 34th Ten Distinguished Chinese Golden Music Prize-Giving Concert", Radio Television Hong Kong
- 2012: "The Gold Award for the Most Favorite New Male Singer", "Jade Solid Gold Prize-Giving Ceremony 2011" organized by TVB JADE Channel
- 2012: "Ant" (螞蟻) as the 4th-Prized song among the top ten compositions, "Young D – Final Nomination for Famous Pop Songs 2011"
- 2012: Gold Award, "Annual Award for Famous New Singer", "Young D – Final Nomination for Famous Pop Songs 2011"
- 2012: "A Close Friend" (知己) as awarded song, Bronze Award in "Annual Award for Famous Chorus Song", "Young D – Final Nomination for Famous Pop Songs 2011"
- 2012: "Annual Award for Famous New Singer", "IFPI Award for the Music Discs with the Best Saleability 2011"
- 2012: "A Trilogy of Departure" (出走三部曲) as one of the top ten Cantonese CD-albums with the Best saleability, "IFPI Award for the Music Discs with the Best Saleability 2011"
- 2012: "Award for New Singer" (Hong Kong & Taiwan Region), "Sprite – Pop Music Prize Giving Ceremony 2011"
- 2012: "My Ideal Wings" (理想的翅膀) as awarded song, "Metro Broadcast Award for Children Song", "Metro Broadcast Prize Giving Ceremony for Children Songs 2011"
- 2012: "Metro Broadcast Award for the Best Male Singer in Children Songs", "Metro Broadcast Prize Giving Ceremony for Children Songs 2011"
- 2012: "Mask" (面具) as awarded song, "Jade Solid Gold Distinguished Nomination – 1st Round", TVB JADE Channel
- 2012: "Award for the Best Cantonese New Male Singer" in "The 12th Chinese Music Media Awards"
- 2012: "Metro Broadcast Mandarin Power of New Male Singer Award", "Metro Broadcast Mandarin Power Prize Presentation Ceremony 2012"
- 2012: "A Close Friend" (知己) as awarded song, "Metro Broadcast Mandarin Power Award for Distinguished Ensemble Song", "Metro Broadcast Mandarin Power Prize Presentation Ceremony 2012"
- 2012: "Yes!! The Most Favourite Male Idol For School Campuses"
- 2012: "Yes!! The Most Favourite Male Idol For Karaoke Singing"
- 2012: "Abandon" (遺棄) as awarded song, "TVB8 Award for Golden Song", "TVB8 Golden Songs Prize Presentation Ceremony 2012"
- 2012: "Close Friend" (知己) as awarded song, "TVB8 Award for Best Ensemble Song", "TVB8 Golden Songs Prize Presentation Ceremony 2012"
- 2012: "Mask" (面具) as awarded song, "Award for Hottest Re-Edited Song", "YAHOO! - Hot People Searching Award"
- 2012: "Grandit" (Re-Growth) (重新長大) as awarded song, "Metro Broadcast Award for Popular Song", "Metro Broadcast Prize Giving Ceremony for Popular Music 2012"
- 2012: "Mask" (面具) as awarded song, "Metro Broadcast Award for Hottest Karaoke Song", "Metro Broadcast Prize Giving Ceremony for Popular Music 2012"
- 2012: "Mask" (面具) as awarded song, "Top Ten Most Popular Songs – 10th Position", "Hong Kong Popular Poll Award for Pop Music Prize Presentation Ceremony 2012"
- 2012: "Grandit" (Re-Growth) (重新長大) as awarded song, "Top Ten Most Recommended Songs for the Nation", "Canada Hottest Chinese Song Award – Final Round Nomination 2012"
- 2013: "Grandit" (Re-Growth) (重新長大) as awarded song, "Award for Top Ten Songs", "Jade Solid Gold Prize-Giving Ceremony 2012" organized by TVB JADE Channel
- 2013: "Mask" (面具) as awarded song, "Award for Hottest Re-Edited Songs", "Jade Solid Gold Prize-Giving Ceremony 2012" organized by TVB JADE Channel
- 2013: "Mask" (面具) as awarded song, "SINA Music Award for Hottest Re-Edited Songs", "SINA Music Prize Presentation Ceremony 2012"
- 2013: "Mask" (面具) as awarded song, "Award for Ten Distinguished Chinese Golden Songs", "The 35th Ten Distinguished Chinese Golden Music Prize-Giving Concert", Radio Television Hong Kong
- 2013: "Award for the Lyric Writers of Ten Distinguished Chinese Golden Songs", "The 35th Ten Distinguished Chinese Golden Music Prize-Giving Concert", Radio Television Hong Kong
- 2013: "Annual Award for Progress in Pop Music Circiuit", "Avant-Garde Music List Prize Presentation Ceremony 2012"
- 2013: "Blue" (藍調) as one of the top ten Cantonese CD-albums with the Best saleability, "IFPI Award for the Music Discs with the Best Saleability 2012"
- 2013: "Mask" (面具) as one of the top ten Cantonese songs with the Best Saleability, "IFPI Award for the Music Discs with the Best Saleability 2012"
- 2013: "Annual Award for Top Ten Famous Local Singer", "IFPI Award for the Music Discs with the Best Saleability 2012"
- 2013: "Mask" (面具) as awarded song, "Award for Best Re-Edited Pop Song", "The 9th King of the Pop Song – Global Chinese Pop Music Fiesta"
- 2013: "Grandit" (Re-Growth) (重新長大) as awarded song, "Award for Best Cantonese Pop Song", "The 9th King of the Pop Song – Global Chinese Pop Music Fiesta"
- 2013: "Grandit" (Re-Growth) (重新長大) as awarded song, "Metro Broadcast Award for Children Song", "Metro Broadcast Prize Giving Ceremony for Children Songs 2012"
- 2013: "Metro Broadcast Award for the Best Male Singer in Children Songs", "Metro Broadcast Prize Giving Ceremony for Children Songs 2012"
- 2013: "The Ode of Youth" (青春頌) as awarded song, "Jade Solid Gold Distinguished Nomination – 1st Round", TVB JADE Channel
- 2013: "The Ode of Youth – Mandarin Version" (青春頌．國語版) as awarded song, "Metro Broadcast Mandarin Power Award for Distinguished Song", "Metro Broadcast Mandarin Power Prize Presentation Ceremony 2013"
- 2013: "YAHOO! Shine Award for Celebrity of Cover Page", "YAHOO! Shine Awards 2013", YAHOO!
- 2013: "Negative Excuses" (負藉口) as awarded song, "TVB8 Award for Golden Song", "TVB8 Golden Songs Prize Presentation Ceremony 2013"
- 2013: "Award for the Healthiest Idol in Students' Impression", "Beacon College Trendy Index – The Student Popular Poll of Metro Broadcast Prize Giving Ceremony for Popular Music 2013"
- 2013: "Award for Popular Male Singer", "Metro Broadcast Prize Giving Ceremony for Popular Music 2013
- 2014: "The Ode of Youth" (青春頌) as awarded song, 3rd Place among the Ten Distinguished Songs based on 903's Professional Recommendations (專業推介叱咤十大第三位), "903 Music Prize Giving Ceremony 2013", Hong Kong Commercial Broadcasting Corporation Limited
- 2014: Bronze Award for "903 Awards for Most Famous Male Singers", "903 Music Prize Giving Ceremony 2013", Hong Kong Commercial Broadcasting Corporation Limited
- 2014: "The Ode of Youth" (青春頌) as awarded song, "Award for Ten Distinguished Chinese Golden Songs", "The 36th Ten Distinguished Chinese Golden Music Prize-Giving Concert 2013", Radio Television Hong Kong
- 2014: "Award for Distinguished Pop Singer", "The 36th Ten Distinguished Chinese Golden Music Prize-Giving Concert 2013", Radio Television Hong Kong
- 2014: "The Ode of Youth" (青春頌) as awarded song, "JSG Award for Top Ten Awarded Songs", Jade Solid Gold Prize-Giving Ceremony 2013" organized by TVB JADE Channel
- 2014: "A Dwelling Shelter" (蝸居) as awarded song, "JSG Award for Top Ten Awarded Songs", Jade Solid Gold Prize-Giving Ceremony 2013" organized by TVB JADE Channel
- 2014: "Grandit" (Re-Growth) (重新長大) as one of the top ten Cantonese pop songs with the best saleability, "IFPI Award for the Music Discs with the Best Saleability 2013"
- 2014: "Times" (時光) as awarded song, "Jade Solid Gold Distinguished Nomination – 1st Round", TVB JADE Channel
- 2014: "Shelter" (護航) as awarded song, "Jade Solid Gold Distinguished Nomination – 1st Round", TVB JADE Channel
- 2014: "The Ode of Youth" (青春頌) as the Most Popular Song, "The 1st Cantonese Pop Song Prize Giving Ceremony"
- 2014: "The Ode of Youth" (青春頌) as the awarded song with the best MV episodes, "The 1st Cantonese Pop Song Prize Giving Ceremony"
- 2014: "Man of the Year" award, "ELLE MEN 1st Anniversary Celebration Banquet" & "Fashion Objects of Desire Awards Presentation"
- 2014: "Shelter" (護航) as the most popular theme song for television film, "YAHOO! Awards for the Most Popular Singer 2014"
- 2014: "Award for the Distinguished Pop Star within Hong Kong level (Hong Kong)", "Global Chinese Pop Songs Prize Giving Ceremony"
- 2014: "Shelter" (護航) as one of the 20 awarded golden songs, "Global Chinese Pop Songs Prize Giving Ceremony"
- 2014: Award for the Annual Avant-Garde Musician with the Best Performances", "Avant-Garde Music List Prize Presentation Ceremony 2014"
- 2014: "Shelter" (護航) as the Most Popular MV Video, Avant-Garde Music List Prize Presentation Ceremony 2014
- 2014: "Invisible Locks" (枷鎖) as awarded song, "Jade Solid Gold Distinguished Nomination – 2nd Round", TVB JADE Channel
- 2014: "Auspiciousness" (福氣) as awarded song, "Jade Solid Gold Distinguished Nomination – 2nd Round", TVB JADE Channel
- 2014: "Metro Broadcast Award for Distinguished Male Singer", "Metro Broadcast Prize Giving Ceremony for Popular Music 2014"
- 2014: "Shelter" (護航) as awarded song, "Metro Broadcast Prize Giving Ceremony for Popular Music 2014"
- 2014: Gold Award for "Metro Broadcast Award for Distinguished Performances and Interpretations", "Metro Broadcast Prize Giving Ceremony for Popular Music 2014"
- 2015: "Shelter" (護航) as awarded song, "Award for Ten Distinguished Chinese Golden Songs", "The 37th Ten Distinguished Chinese Golden Music Prize-Giving Concert 2014", Radio Television Hong Kong
- 2015: "Award for Distinguished Pop Singer", "The 37th Ten Distinguished Chinese Golden Music Prize-Giving Concert 2014", Radio Television Hong Kong
- 2015: "Invisible Locks" (枷鎖) as awarded song, "Jade Solid Gold Prize-Giving Ceremony 2014" organized by TVB JADE Channel
- 2015: "Shelter" (護航) as awarded song, "Jade Solid Gold Prize-Giving Ceremony 2014" organized by TVB JADE Channel
- 2015: "Award for Distinguished Performance", "Jade Solid Gold Prize-Giving Ceremony 2014" organized by TVB JADE Channel
- 2015: "Shelter" (護航) – Mandarin Version", "TVB8 Award for Golden Song", "TVB8 Golden Songs Prize Presentation Ceremony 2014"
- 2015: "Award for the Most Popular Male Singer", "TVB8 Golden Songs Prize Presentation Ceremony 2014"
- 2015: "The Times – New Songs + Best Selections" (The Times 時光 - 新曲 + 精選) as one of the top ten Cantonese music albums with the best saleability, "IFPI Award for the Music Discs with the Best Saleability 2014"
- 2021: "Feebleness" (無力感) - one of the Top 10 awarded golden songs organized by VivTV, 《Chill Club》, presented on Apr 18, 2021

Awards and achievements
Preceded by None	Hong Kong in the ABU TV Song Festival; 2012 with "Ma Ngai"	Succeeded by Mag Lam with "Shi Jian"
